= Samantha Mumba discography =

- Studio albums: 1
- Extended plays: 1
- Compilation albums: 1
- Singles: 16
- Music videos: 8

The discography of Samantha Mumba, an Irish singer who rose to fame in 2000, consists of one studio album, one EP, one compilation, and 16 singles, including three as a featured artist.

== Albums ==
=== Studio albums ===
Year	Details	Peak chart positions					Certifications (sales thresholds)
Year	Details	IRE	AUS	SWI	UK	US	Certifications (sales thresholds)
2000	Gotta Tell You: Released: 31 October 2000; Label: Polydor; Formats: CD, Cassette	4	146	53	9	67	BPI: Gold

=== Compilations ===
Year	Details
2006	The Collection: Released 23 October 2006

== EPs ==
Year	Details
2001	Samantha Sings Christmas: Released December 2001; Given away free with newspapers

== Singles ==
=== As lead artist ===
Year	Single	Peak chart positions										Certifications (sales thresholds)	Album
Year	Single	IRE	AUS	FRA	GER	NL	NZ	SWE	SWI	UK	US	Certifications (sales thresholds)	Album
2000	"Gotta Tell You"	1	3	9	28	7	1	14	17	2	4	ARIA: Platinum; BPI: Gold	Gotta Tell You
2000	"Body II Body"	2	14	53	—	—	45	40	58	5	—		Gotta Tell You
2001	"Always Come Back to Your Love"	1	63	—	—	—	43	—	—	3	—	BPI: Gold	Gotta Tell You
2001	"Baby, Come Over (This Is Our Night)"	2	35	—	—	—	50	—	67	5	49		Gotta Tell You
2001	"Don't Need You To (Tell Me I'm Pretty)"	—	—	—	—	—	—	—	—	—	— (Note: "Don't Need You To (Tell Me I'm Pretty)" did not enter the US Billboard Hot 100 but peaked at number 20 on the US Billboard Hot Singles Sales chart.)		Gotta Tell You
2001	"Lately"	3	—	—	—	—	—	—	—	6	—		Gotta Tell You
2002	"I'm Right Here"	3	32	—	51	39	—	—	81	5	— (Note: "I'm Right Here" did not enter the US Billboard Hot 100 but peaked on the US CHR/Pop Top 50 (Radio & Records) chart.)		The Collection
2013	"Somebody Like Me"	5	—	—	—	—	—	—	—	—	—		Non-album singles
2014	"Only Just Begun"	—	—	—	—	—	—	—	—	—	—		Non-album singles
2020	"Cool"	—	—	—	—	—	—	—	—	—	—		Non-album singles
2020	"Process"	—	—	—	—	—	—	—	—	—	—		Non-album singles
2023	"The Lie"	—	—	—	—	—	—	—	—	—	—		Non-album singles
2025	"My Way"	—	—	—	—	—	—	—	—	—	—		Non-album singles

=== As featured artist ===
Year	Single	Album
2008	"Gotta Tell You (Remix)" (Micky Modelle vs. Samantha Mumba)	N.A.
2009	"Stay in the Middle" (Hill Zaini featuring Samantha Mumba)	Filling in the Pages
2014	"Evolution 2" (Kid Bookie featuring Kxng Crooked, Kuniva, Samantha Mumba, Lady Leshurr, Scrufizzer, Zeph Ellis)	That SP Compilation, Vol.1

=== Appearances ===
Year	Song	Album
2002	"Read My Mind"	The Guru soundtrack

== Music videos ==
Year	Song	Director
2000	"Gotta Tell You"	Michael Geoghegan
2000	"Body II Body"	Dawn Shadforth
2001	"Always Come Back to Your Love"	Cameron Casey
2001	"Baby, Come Over (This Is Our Night)"	Joseph Kahn
2001	"Lately"	Earle Sebastian
2002	"I'm Right Here"	Darren Grant
2008	"Gotta Tell You (Remix)" (featuring Micky Modelle)	Iain Titterington
2009	"Stay in the Middle" (with Hill Zaini)	Omero Mumba
2020	"Cool"	Marc Cleary
2020	"Process"	Marc Cleary
