= List of Faye Dunaway performances =

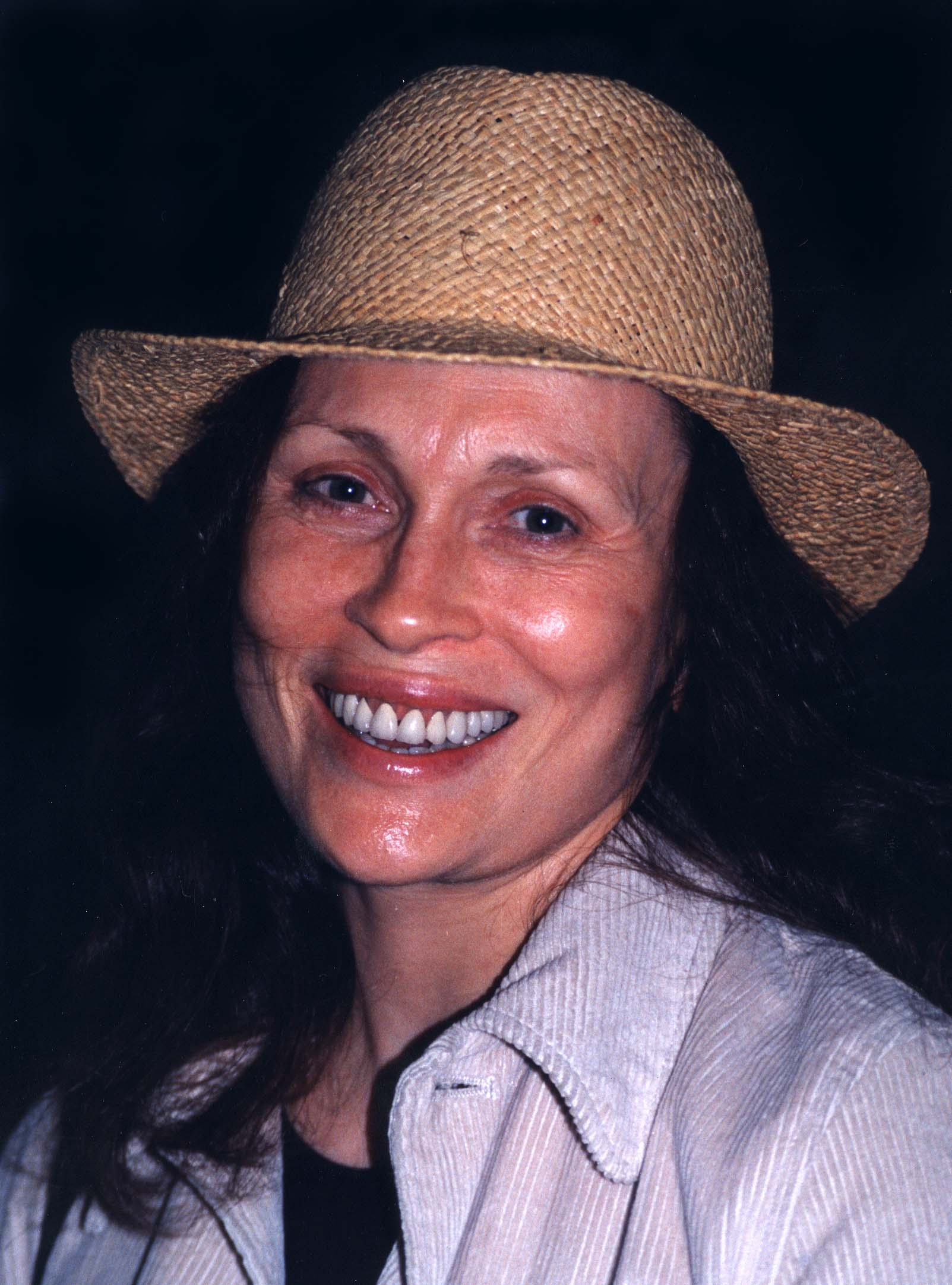
Dunaway in 1997

Faye Dunaway is an American actress who has appeared in over seventy films, thirty television shows, thirteen plays and two music videos. Regarded as one of the greatest actresses of her generation, she was one of the leading actresses during the golden age of New Hollywood. After her film debut The Happening, she starred in the gangster film Bonnie and Clyde, in which she was nominated for the Academy Award for Best Actress. She starred with Steve McQueen in The Thomas Crown Affair (1968). In 1969, she co-starred with Kirk Douglas in Elia Kazan's drama The Arrangement. The following year, she starred with Dustin Hoffman in Little Big Man. In 1970, her performance in Jerry Schatzberg's experimental drama Puzzle of a Downfall Child earned her a Golden Globe nomination for Best Actress – Motion Picture Drama. She portrayed Milady de Winter in Richard Lester's The Three Musketeers (1973) and The Four Musketeers (1974).

In 1974, Dunaway starred in Roman Polanski's crime film Chinatown, in which she was nominated for the Academy Award, a Golden Globe and a BAFTA for her performance. That same year, she appeared in the all-star disaster epic The Towering Inferno. In 1975, her role in Sydney Pollack's political thriller Three Days of the Condor earned her a fourth Golden Globe nomination. Dunaway received the Academy Award for Best Actress and the Golden Globe Award for Best Actress - Motion Picture Drama for her performance in Sidney Lumet's satire Network (1976). She then starred in the thriller Eyes of Laura Mars (1978) and the drama The Champ (1979). Her controversial portrayal of Joan Crawford in the 1981 film Mommie Dearest became one of her most famous roles, but she later blamed the film for hurting her career.

She won a Golden Globe Award for Best Supporting Actress – Series, Miniseries or Television Film for her work in the miniseries Ellis Island (1985) and received critical acclaim for her performance in Barbet Schroeder's drama Barfly (1987), opposite Mickey Rourke. Her role in a 1993 episode of Columbo earned her a Primetime Emmy Award for Outstanding Guest Actress in a Drama Series. She co-starred with Johnny Depp twice, in the surrealist comedy-drama Arizona Dream (1993) and the romantic comedy Don Juan DeMarco (1995). Her portrayal of Wilhelmina Cooper in the drama Gia (1998) with Angelina Jolie earned her a third Golden Globe Award, for Best Supporting Actress – Series, Miniseries or Television. Dunaway also appeared in the James Gray-directed crime film The Yards (2000) and Roger Avary's satirical black comedy The Rules of Attraction (2002).

Dunaway started her acting career on Broadway and appeared in several plays throughout her career, including A Man for All Seasons (1961–63), After the Fall (1964), Hogan's Goat (1965–67) and A Streetcar Named Desire (1973). She was awarded the Sarah Siddons Award for her portrayal of opera singer Maria Callas in Master Class (1996). Dunaway also appeared in two music videos, Tom Petty and the Heartbreakers' Into the Great Wide Open in 1991 and Hill Zaini's I Heard in 2010.

== Filmography ==
Key
†	Denotes works that have not yet been released

=== Film ===
Year	Title	Role(s)	Notes	Ref(s)
1967	The Happening	Sandy		
1967	Hurry Sundown	Lou McDowell		
1967	Bonnie and Clyde	Bonnie Parker		
1968	The Thomas Crown Affair	Vicki Anderson		
1968	A Place for Lovers	Julia		
1969	The Extraordinary Seaman	Jennifer Winslow		
1969	The Arrangement	Gwen		
1970	Little Big Man	Mrs. Louise Pandrake		
1970	Puzzle of a Downfall Child	Lou Andreas Sand		
1971	The Deadly Trap	Jill		
1971	Doc	Katie Elder		
1973	Oklahoma Crude	Lena Doyle		
1973	The Three Musketeers	Milady de Winter		
1974	Chinatown	Evelyn Cross Mulwray		
1974	The Towering Inferno	Susan Franklin		
1974	The Four Musketeers	Milady de Winter		
1975	Three Days of the Condor	Katherine "Kathy" Hale		
1976	Voyage of the Damned	Denise Kreisler		
1976	Network	Diana Christensen		
1978	Eyes of Laura Mars	Laura Mars		
1979	The Champ	Annie		
1980	The First Deadly Sin	Barbara Delaney		
1981	Mommie Dearest	Joan Crawford		
1983	The Wicked Lady	Lady Barbara Skelton		
1984	Ordeal by Innocence	Rachel Argyle		
1984	Supergirl	Selena		
1987	Barfly	Wanda Wilcox		
1988	Midnight Crossing	Helen Barton		
1988	The Gamble	Countess Matilda Von Wallenstein		
1988	Burning Secret	Mrs. Sonya Tuchman		
1989	Crystal or Ash, Fire or Wind, as Long as It's Love	Mrs. Colbert		
1989	Wait Until Spring, Bandini	Mrs. Hildegarde		
1990	The Handmaid's Tale	Serena Joy		
1990	The Two Jakes	Evelyn Mulwray	Voice cameo	
1991	Scorchers	Thais		
1992	Double Edge	Faye Milano		
1993	Arizona Dream	Elaine Stalker		
1993	The Temp	Charlene Towne		
1994	Don Juan DeMarco	Marilyn Mickler		
1995	Drunks	Becky		
1996	Dunston Checks In	Elena Dubrow		
1996	Albino Alligator	Janet Boudreaux		
1996	The Twilight of the Golds	Phyllis Gold		
1996	The Chamber	Lee Cayhall Bowen		
1997	In Praise of Older Women	Condesa		
1999	Love Lies Bleeding	Josephine Butler		
1999	The Thomas Crown Affair	The Psychiatrist		
1999	The Messenger: The Story of Joan of Arc	Yolande of Aragon		
2000	The Yards	Kitty Olchin		
2000	Stanley's Gig	Leila		
2001	The Yellow Bird	Aurora Beavis	Short film	
2002	Changing Hearts	Betty Miller		
2002	The Rules of Attraction	Mrs. Eve Denton		
2002	The Calling	Mae West		
2003	Blind Horizon	Mrs. K		
2004	Last Goodbye	Sean Winston		
2004	El Padrino	Atty. Gen. Navarro		
2004	Jennifer's Shadow	Mary Ellen Cassi		
2005	Ghosts Never Sleep	Kathleen Dolan		
2006	Love Hollywood Style	God		
2006	Rain	Isabel Hudson		
2006	Cut Off	Marilyn Burton		
2007	Cougar Club	Edith Birnbaum		
2007	Say It in Russian	Jacqueline de Rossy		
2007	The Gene Generation	Josephine Hayden		
2008	The Rage	Madre		
2008	Flick	Lieutenant Annie McKenzie		
2009	The Magic Stone	Filomena		
2009	Balladyna	Therapist		
2009	21 and a Wake-Up	Major Rose Thorn		
2014	Master Class (Note: Unfinished film directed by Dunaway, shot between 2009 and 2014. It was announced in June 2014 that after nearly 20 years of owning the film rights, Dunaway had decided to withdraw from the project.)	Maria Callas	Unreleased; Also producer and writer	
2017	The Bye Bye Man	Widow Redmond		
2017	The Case for Christ	Dr. Roberta Waters		
2017	Inconceivable	Donna		
2022	The Man Who Drew God	Tasha		
2024	Faye	Herself	Documentary	
TBA	Fate †	Tilly	Post-production	
TBA	The Evilry †	Anastasia	Pre-production	
TBA	Prima †	TBA	Filming	

=== Television ===
Year	Title	Role(s)	Notes	Network	Ref(s)
1965	Seaway	Alexis Webster	Episode: "34th Man"	CBC	
1966	The Trials of O'Brien	Myra	Episode: "The 10 Foot, 6 Inch Pole"	CBS	
1971	Great Performances	Kathleen Stanton	Episode: "Hogan's Goat"	PBS	
1971	The Woman I Love	Wallis Simpson	Television film	ABC	
1976	The Disappearance of Aimee	Aimee Semple McPherson	Television film	NBC	
1981	Evita Perón	Eva Perón	Television film	NBC	
1982	The Country Girl	Georgie Elgin	Television film	Showtime	
1984	Ellis Island	Maud Charteris	Television miniseries	CBS	
1985	Christopher Columbus	Isabella I of Castile	Television miniseries	CBS	
1985	Thirteen at Dinner	Jane Wilkinson / Carlotta Adams	Television film	CBS	
1986	Beverly Hills Madam	Lil Hutton	Television film	NBC	
1987	Casanova	Madame D'Urfe	Television film	CBS	
1989	Cold Sassy Tree	Love Simpson Blakeslee	Television film	TNT	
1990	Silhouette	Samantha Kimball	Television film	USA Network	
1993	It Had to Be You	Laura Scofield	6 episodes	CBS	
1993	Columbo	Lauren Staton	Episode: "It's All in the Game"	ABC	
1995	A Family Divided	Karen Billingsley	Television film	NBC	
1995	Road to Avonlea	Countess Polenska	Episode: "What a Tangled Web We Weave"	Disney Channel	
1996	The People Next Door	Ellen Morse	Television film	CBS	
1997	Rebecca	Mrs. Van Hopper	Television miniseries	PBS	
1998	A Will of Their Own	Margaret Sanger	Television miniseries	NBC	
1998	Gia	Wilhelmina Cooper	Television film	HBO	
2000	Running Mates	Meg Gable	Television film	TNT	
2001	Touched by an Angel	Dr. Rebecca Markham	2 episodes	CBS	
2001	Soul Food	Katherine Burke	Episode: "Tonight at Noon"	Showtime	
2002	The Biographer	Amanda Washington	Television film	CBS	
2002–03	Alias	Ariana Kane	3 episodes	ABC	
2004	Anonymous Rex	Shin	Television film	Sci-Fi Channel	
2004	Back When We Were Grownups	Tina	Television film	CBS	
2005	The Starlet	Herself	Reality television series	The WB	
2006	CSI: Crime Scene Investigation	Lois O'Neill	Episode: "Kiss-Kiss, Bye-Bye"	CBS	
2007	Pandemic	Gov. Shaefer	Television miniseries	Hallmark Channel	
2009	Grey's Anatomy	Dr. Margaret Campbell	Episode: "An Honest Mistake"	ABC	
2009	Midnight Bayou	Odette	Television film	Lifetime	
2010	A Family Thanksgiving	Gina	Television film	Hallmark Channel	
2016	Documentary Now!	Faye Dunaway	Episode: "Mr. Runner Up: My Life as an Oscar Bridesmaid, Part 1"	IFC	
2017	Faye Dunaway: Live from the TCM Classic Film Festival	Herself	Documentary	TCM	

== Theatre ==
Year	Title	Role	Venue	Ref(s)
1961–63	A Man for All Seasons	Margaret More	August Wilson Theatre	
1964	But for Whom Charlie	Faith Prosper	Lincoln Center	
1964–65	After the Fall	Nurse	Lincoln Center	
1965	The Changeling	Maid	Lincoln Center	
1965	Tartuffe		Lincoln Center	
1965–67	Hogan's Goat	Kathleen Stanton	Off-Broadway	
1971	Candida	Candida	Summer theatre	
1972	Old Times	Anna	Mark Taper Forum	
1973	A Streetcar Named Desire	Blanche DuBois	Ahmanson Theatre	
1982	The Curse of an Aching Heart	Frances Walsh	Little Theatre	
1985–6	Circe and Bravo	Circe	Hampstead Theatre	
1996–97	Master Class	Maria Callas	U.S. Tour	
2019	Tea at Five	Katharine Hepburn	Huntington Theatre Company	

== Music video appearances ==
Year	Song	Artist(s)	Album	Role	Ref(s)
1991	"Into the Great Wide Open"	Tom Petty and the Heartbreakers	Into the Great Wide Open	Eddie's manager	
2010	"I Heard"	Hill Zaini	Filling in the Pages	Film director	
