= Shaving in Judaism =

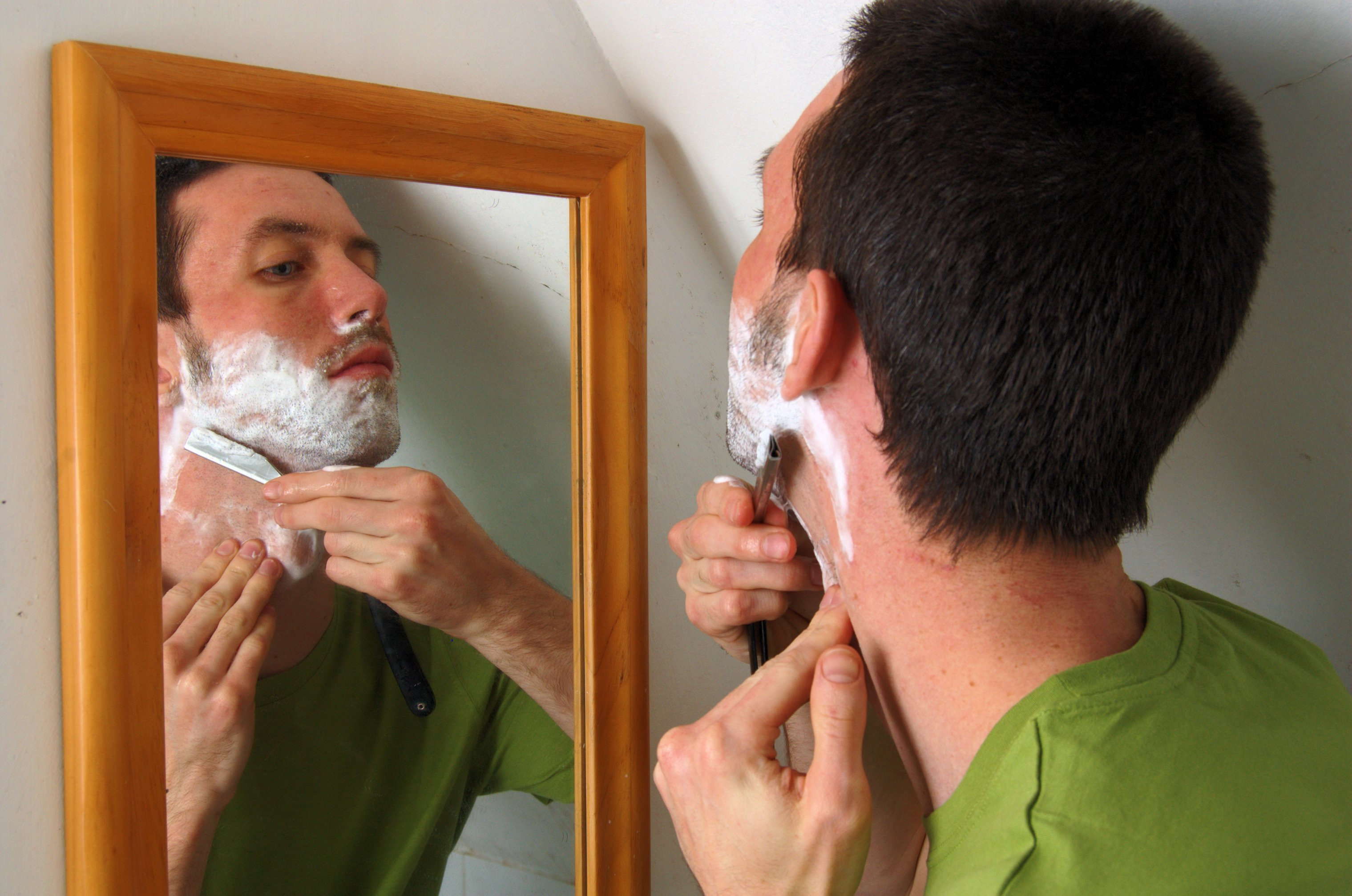
- Shaving the beard with a razor is strictly forbidden by Jewish Law

Halakhic texts relating to this article
- Torah: Leviticus 19:27
- Mishneh Torah: Avodah Kochavim 12:1
- Shulchan Aruch: Yoreh De'ah 181

Halacha, or 'Jewish law' prohibits shaving with a razor on the basis of a rabbinic interpretation of Leviticus 19:27, which states, "Ye shall not round the corners of your heads, neither shalt thou mar the corners of thy beard." The Mishnah interprets this as a prohibition on using a razor on the beard. The prohibition does not, however, apply to trimming with scissors or other forms of facial hair removal that do not involve a razor on the face.

Based on the words "the corners of your heads" in the same verse, halacha requires that Jews not cut their sideburns above the cheekbone, leaving pe'ot.

This prohibition is further expanded upon in kabbalistic literature.

== In the Torah ==
The Book of Leviticus mentions the "corners of the head" and prohibits the "marring" of the "corners of the beard," with particular emphasis on kohanim not marring the beard; as with many other parts of Leviticus, the Book of Ezekiel describes different regulations, stating that the priests should not shave their heads or let their locks grow long.

However, there were exceptions, with the Book of Ezekiel itself adding that priests should keep their hair trimmed, and Leviticus arguing that, in certain cases of tzaraath (skin conditions), the beard and hair should be completely shaved away. Numbers (Ch. 6) additionally requires that Nazarites shave their heads seven days after any contact with corpses.

=== Origin ===
According to biblical scholars, the shaving of hair, particularly of the "corners of the beard", was originally a mourning custom; the behaviour appears, from the Book of Jeremiah, to also have been practiced by other ancient Semitic-speaking peoples. In the Ugaritic Baal Cycle, for example, El shaves off his beard in grief on learning that Baal is dead. However, some ancient manuscripts of Jeremiah read "live in remote places" rather than "clip the corners of their hair." Biblical scholars think that the regulations against shaving hair may be an attack on the practice of offering hair to the dead, which was performed in the belief that it would obtain protection in Sheol; Nazirites shaved after contact with a corpse, captive women shaved after mourning the death of their parents, and the general prohibition in the Holiness code is immediately followed by a rule against people cutting their bodies for the benefit of the dead.

Textual scholars date the Priestly source, and the Holiness and Priestly Codes within it, to the late 7th century BCE or later; it appears that before this time, the shaving of the head during mourning was permitted, and even encouraged. The Book of Amos, which textual scholars date to the mid-7th century, as well as the books of Isaiah and of Micah, which textual scholars date to a slightly later period, portray God as instructing the Israelites to shave their head as an act of mourning: "God ... called you to weep and mourn. He told you to shave your heads in sorrow for your sins." Isaiah 22:12.

The prohibition against cutting the "corners of the beard" may also have been an attempt to distinguish the appearance of Israelites from that of the surrounding nations, and reduce the influence of foreign religions; Maimonides criticises it as being the custom of "idolatrous priests:. The Hittites and Elamites were clean-shaven, and the Sumerians were also frequently without a beard; conversely, the ancient Egyptians and Libyans shaved the beard into very stylised and elongated goatees.

== In classical rabbinical literature ==
The forbidding of shaving the corners of the head was interpreted by the Mishnah as prohibiting the hair at the temples being cut so that the hairline was a straight line from behind the ears to the forehead; thus it was deemed necessary to retain sidelocks, leading to the development of a distinctly Jewish form of sidelock, known as payot. As for the beard, more complicated views arose; the corners of the beard were explained to refer to five extremities in the Talmud. There are many opinions in medieval scholars as to what these five points are. For example, it may be a point on each cheek near the temples, a point at the end of the cheek bone towards the centre of the face, and the point of the chin. Or it may be two on the mustache, two somewhere on the cheek, and one on the point on the chin. As a result, Shulchan Aruch prohibits the shaving of the entire beard and mustache.

Because the biblical prohibition against shaving uses the Hebrew word gelech (גלח), which refers to shaving with a blade against the skin, Talmudic rabbis interpreted it to only refer to a blade, and only to the hair being cut close to the roots, in a smooth manner. This means that only a razor would be prohibited, trimming or non-razor shaving would be permitted. In the ancient land of Israel, it was common among more scholarly circles of Jews to clip beards.

Ezekiel's request for priests to keep their hair trimmed was read by the Talmudists as referring specifically to the artistic Lydian style of haircut, in which the ends of the hair of one row reaches the roots of the next. This hairstyle was apparently a distinguishing feature of the nobility, as the common population shaved their heads entirely except for the sidelocks; the king is said to have had his hair cut in this manner each day, the Jewish High Priest to have done so each week just before the Sabbath, and ordinary Jewish priests to have done so every thirty days. The Talmudic Rabbis also argue that anyone who was constantly in contact with government officers could adopt tonsures, although they do state that to everyone else it was forbidden; during the period of Hellenic domination over Judah, the tonsure was a fashionable haircut among the Greeks.

== In rabbinic literature of the Middle Ages ==
The Shulchan Aruch quotes the Talmud that because scissors have two blades, it would therefore be permitted to trim the beard by using them since the cutting action would come from contact between two blades and not from that between blade and skin. In Germany and Italy, by the end of the seventeenth century, Jews started removing beards with the aid of pumice stones and chemical depilatories, which would leave the face smooth as if it had been shaven. These are non-razor shaves, which are not prohibited. The third Lubavitcher Rebbe, Menachem Mendel Schneersohn, argued that shaving a beard would fall under the biblical regulation against crossdressing (he also extended the prohibition for wanton destruction to destroying the hair of the beard); the Shulchan Aruch interpreted this regulation in a different way, arguing that it forbade men from removing hair from areas where women were accustomed to removing hair, such as underarm hair and pubic hair.

In the early Middle Ages, Jewish custom concerning beards followed the fashions of each nation; in Germany, France, and Italy, Jews removed their beards, but in Muslim countries, Jews grew them long. In 1720, a mild confrontation arose between a group of Italian Jews, who had migrated to Salonica in the Ottoman Empire, and the local Jewish population because the Italians didn't wear beards while the local population insisted they were necessary. It was later remarked by Jacob Emden that the Jewish population in Western Europe had objected to these regulations so much that it had been impractical to enforce them, There had also been prominent opponents of beards, such as Joseph Solomon Delmedigo, to whom is attributed the epigram, "If men are judged wise by their beards and their girth, then goats were the wisest of creatures on earth."

=== In Kabbalah ===
The Zohar, one of the primary sources of Kabbalah, attributes holiness to the beard and strongly discourages its removal, declaring that even the shortening of a beard by scissors is a great sin. It was said that Isaac Luria, a significant figure in the history of Kabbalistic mysticism, meticulously avoided touching his beard lest he should accidentally cause hairs to drop from it. Kabbalistic teachings gradually spread into Slavic regions. Consequently, beard trimming was discouraged in these areas, even if it involved scissors. Hasidic Jews more closely followed Kabbalistic practices than Litvaks and Misnagdim; Hasidic Jews are often known for the distinctive beards. However, in Italy, shaving the beard was so popular that even the Italian followers of Kabbalah did it; an Italian Kabbalist even argued that beard shaving was only prohibited in Canaan and was to be encouraged elsewhere.

== Electric shavers ==
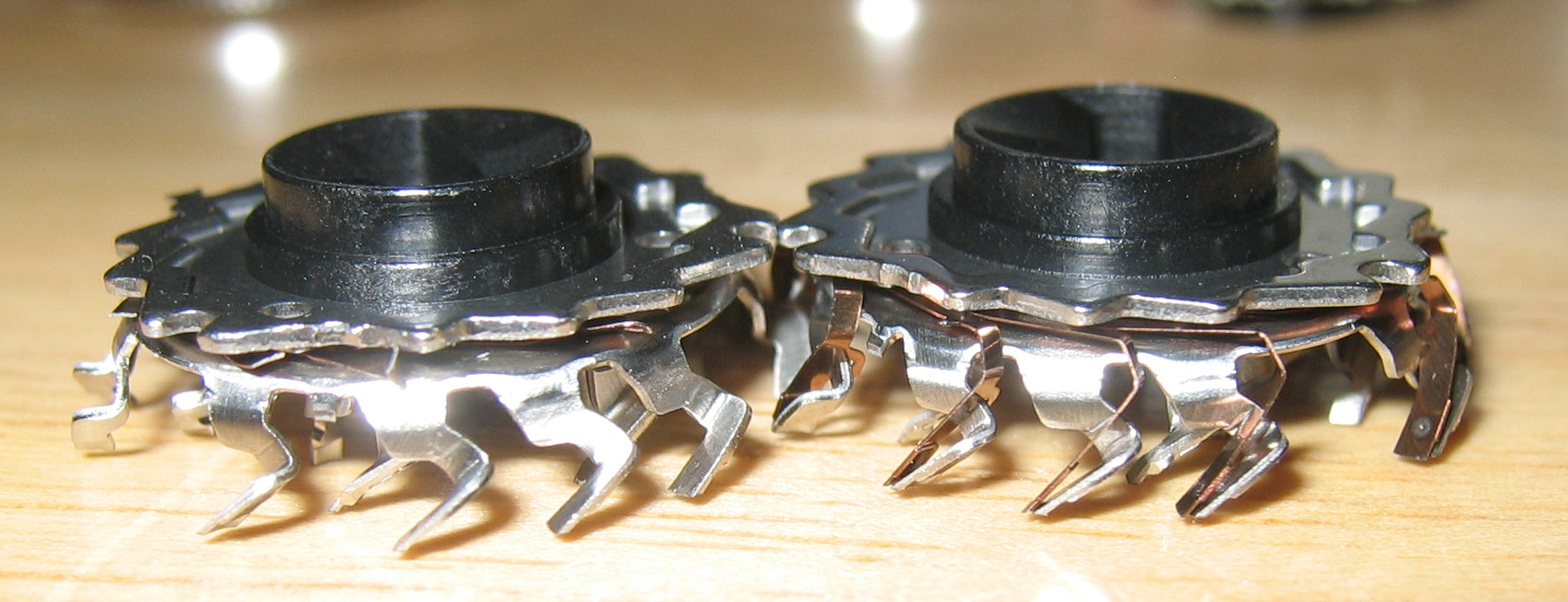
The rotary head on the right still has the primary blades (tin color) adjacent to each of the secondary blades, while the head on the left has had these lift and cut blades removed.

In Leviticus 19:27, which is part of the Holiness code, Jews are prohibited from "destroying" the corners of the beard. The Talmud, Makkot 20a understand this means the use of a single-bladed razor (as opposed to any scissors-like device, which requires two blades to cut) or to remove beard hair even with tweezers. Therefore, Jewish men may not use a razor to cut certain parts of their beards. For practical purposes, those who comply with halakha as defined by Rabbinic Judaism refrain from the use of razors altogether.

Many Orthodox Jews, especially Hasidic Orthodox Jews, refrain from cutting their beards altogether and never cut their facial hair, with the exception of occasionally trimming their mustaches with scissors when they interfere with eating. Orthodox Jews who do shave their facial hair must utilize electric shavers rather than razors.

Some modern Jewish religious legislators in Orthodox Judaism, including Moshe Feinstein and Yosef Eliyahu Henkin, permit the use of electric shavers to remain clean-shaven, because, in their view, electric razors work like scissors, cutting by trapping hair between the blades and a metal grating. However, other modern rabbinical authorities, such as Avrohom Yeshaya Karelitz and Yaakov Yisrael Kanievsky, consider electric razors, particularly rotary models which use "Lift and Cut" heads made by Philips, to work in the manner of primitive razors, and consequently prohibit their use. According to some interpretations of the permissive view, these shavers can be used if the lifters attached to the shaver's cutters are removed first. According to other interpretations of this view, these shavers can be used without removing the lifters; indeed, according to some, it may even be preferable not to do so.

The rotary electric shaver was invented by a Jewish engineer named Alexandre Horowitz. Many Orthodox Jews prefer to grow beards, for a variety of religious, social, and cultural reasons, even if they believe that electric shavers would be permitted; many Orthodox Jews, even Hasidic ones, today grow beards to keep the tradition of their ancestors, regardless of the permissibility of their removal.

Approved depilating chemicals were also a common way to remove hair.

== Mourning (including Sefirat Haomer and The Three Weeks) ==
Orthodox Jewish mourners do not shave or get a haircut for thirty days. This refers to those observing one of the seven types of personal loss: Father, Mother, Spouse, Brother, Sister, Son, Daughter.

There is another type of mourning. Haircut and shaving customs apply, each according to custom, for the communal mourning during the Three Weeks, and to part or all of the period known as Counting of the Omer.

== Body and pubic hair removal ==
=== For men ===
The Talmud prohibits men from shaving their body and pubic hair because such activity is considered feminine behavior, violating the prohibition of: "A man shall not put on a woman’s garment." Ashkenazi Jewish men followed the Talmudic law as they lived in a European society in which such shaving was regarded as feminine. Sephardic men since the Geonic era have shaved their body and pubic hair as this was the practice amongst Muslim men of their society.

=== For women ===
While many Jewish women practice hair covering, some Jewish women from ultra-Orthodox Hasidic sects, including Satmar and Toldot Aharon, are expected to shave their heads upon marriage and keep them shaved under head coverings, including sheitels. The practice began in Eastern Europe in the late 18th century. It is an example of minhag, not halacha.

== Antisemitic attacks ==
During twentieth century antisemitic violence, especially the Holocaust, Germans and other perpetrators would forcibly shave Jewish men as a form of humiliation.

== See also ==
- Payot
- Tonsure
