= I'm Right Here =

2002 single by Samantha Mumba

Single by Samantha Mumba
- B-side: "Sensuality"
- Released: 12 August 2002
- Studio: Murlyn (Stockholm, Sweden); Record Plant, Royaltone (Los Angeles)
- Length: 3:20
- Label: Polydor; Wildcard
- Songwriters: Kandi Burruss; Pontus Winnberg; Christian Karlsson; Henrik Jonback
- Producer: Bloodshy & Avant

Samantha Mumba singles chronology
"Lately" (2001)	"I'm Right Here" (2002)	"Stay in the Middle" (2009)

"I'm Right Here" is a song by Irish singer Samantha Mumba, released as the lead single from her aborted second studio album, Woman (2002). The single was released on 12 August 2002 in the United States and on 14 October 2002 in the United Kingdom. It reached number three in Ireland and number five in the United Kingdom.

== Music video ==
The video for "I'm Right Here" (directed by Darren Grant), features Samantha Mumba and a group of girls in fireman-type outfits hosing down unfaithful men with a fire hose riding in a firetruck. Jamaican deejay Damian Marley, son of reggae singer Bob Marley, and dancer Cris Judd are featured in the video.

== Track listings ==
UK CD1

1. "I'm Right Here"
2. "Sensuality"
3. "I'm Right Here" (Crash Vocal mix)
4. "I'm Right Here" (video)

UK CD2

1. "I'm Right Here"
2. "Gotta Tell You"
3. "Always Come Back to Your Love"
4. "Gotta Tell You" (video)

UK cassette single

A1. "I'm Right Here"
B1. "Gotta Tell You"
B2. "Always Come Back to Your Love"

European CD single

1. "I'm Right Here"
2. "Wish Upon a Star"

Australian CD single

1. "I'm Right Here"
2. "I'm Right Here" (featuring Damian Marley)
3. "Wish Upon a Star"
4. "I'm Right Here" (video)

== Credits and personnel ==
Credits are lifted from the UK CD1 liner notes.

Studios

- Recorded at Murlyn Studios (Stockholm, Sweden), Record Plant Recording Studios, and Royaltone Studios (Los Angeles)
- Mixed at Record Plant Recording Studios (Los Angeles)
- Mastered at Oasis Mastering (Burbank, California)

Personnel

- Kandi Burruss – writing, background vocals, additional vocal production
- Bloodshy & Avant – production, arrangement, recording
  - Pontus Winnberg – writing
  - Christian Karlsson – writing
- Henrik Jonback – writing
- Toya Smith – background vocals
- Henrik Jonback – guitar
- John Goux – guitar
- Alex Al – bass guitar
- Luis Conte – percussion
- Jerry Hey – horn
- Gary Grant – horn
- Larry Williams – horn
- Tony Maserati – mixing
- Eddy Schreyer – mastering

== Charts ==
=== Weekly charts ===
Chart (2002–2003)	Peak position
Australia (ARIA)	32
Australian Urban (ARIA)	12
Belgium (Ultratip Bubbling Under Flanders)	8
Belgium (Ultratip Bubbling Under Wallonia)	10
Germany (GfK)	51
Ireland (IRMA)	3
Netherlands (Dutch Top 40)	39
Netherlands (Single Top 100)	72
Scottish Singles Sales (Official Charts)	8
Switzerland (Schweizer Hitparade)	81
UK Singles (Official Charts)	5
UK Hip Hop/R&B (Official Charts)	4
US CHR/Pop Top 50 (Radio & Records)	39

=== Year-end charts ===
Chart (2002)	Position
Ireland (IRMA)	67
UK Singles (OCC)	170

== Release history ==
Region	Date	Format(s)	Label(s)	Ref.
United States	12 August 2002	Contemporary hit radio	A&M	
United Kingdom	14 October 2002	CD; cassette	Polydor; Wildcard	
Belgium	4 December 2002	CD	Polydor	
Australia	12 January 2003	CD	Polydor; Wildcard	
