= One More Try (George Michael song) =

1988 single by George Michael

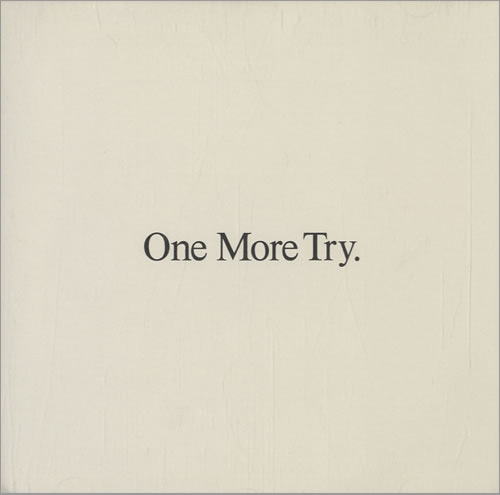

Single by George Michael

from the album Faith
- B-side: "Look at Your Hands"
- Released: 11 April 1988
- Recorded: 1987
- Genre: Blue-eyed soul; gospel-pop
- Length: 5:52 (album); 5:49 (single)
- Label: Columbia; Epic
- Songwriter: George Michael
- Producer: George Michael

George Michael singles chronology
"Father Figure" (1987)	"One More Try" (1988)	"Monkey" (1988)

Music video
- "One More Try" on YouTube

"One More Try" is a song recorded by English singer and songwriter George Michael from his debut solo album, Faith (1987). It was released on 11 April 1988 as the album's fourth single by Columbia Records. The song hit number one on all of the US Billboard Hot 100, the Hot Black Singles and the Hot Adult Contemporary charts. Its music video was directed by Tony Scott and filmed in Australia.

== Background ==
A blue-eyed soul and gospel-pop ballad at almost six minutes in length, "One More Try" lyrically explores a young man's hesitancy to enter/revisit a new relationship because he had been emotionally hurt so many times previously. The song concludes with temptation taking over, and Michael ends by singing the title for the only time. In 1988, Michael told Countdown that the song was written, recorded and finished in eight hours.

"One More Try" remained a live favourite at Michael's concerts in the years which followed including a live gospel version performed at Wembley Arena on 1 December 1993 as a part of the Concert of Hope, later released on the "Jesus to a Child" single in 1996.

== Critical reception ==
Tony Reed from Melody Maker wrote, "I've had enough of danger, George sings on this, the third single off Faith, and apparently quite the crowd pleaser on his current world tour. Now what sort of danger could that be? The mini bar running out of Perrier? The batteries in his Philishave packing in?" He also declared it as a "very, very sl-o-ow ballad".

== Chart performance ==
It reached number eight on the UK Singles Chart and became his sixth number one on the Billboard Hot 100 in the US. Four of the six singles issued from Faith went to number one in America, while by comparison, none managed to do so in the UK.

"One More Try" was the third consecutive number one single from the Faith album. "One More Try" debuted at an impressive number 40 the week of 16 April 1988, and matching the speed of "Father Figure", reached number one by its seventh week, 28 May 1988, staying there for three consecutive weeks. "One More Try" was the second-longest running number one of 1988, tied with "Every Rose Has Its Thorn" by Poison, and behind the four-week run of Steve Winwood's "Roll with It". In total, "One More Try" spent seven weeks in the top 10 and 14 weeks in the top 40 of the Billboard Hot 100, out of a total of 18 weeks. It was a triple-chart number one, also topping the then-Hot Black Singles chart and the Adult Contemporary charts, and becoming the last number-one single on the now-Hot R&B/Hip-Hop Songs chart by a white male artist until Robin Thicke's "Lost Without U" (2007).

== Music video ==
Filmmaker Tony Scott directed the simple music video for the song, which features Michael singing alone in an empty room. The first shot of the video alone lasts a little over two minutes, ending at the beginning of the second verse. Throughout, a grey-blue light can be seen shining into his window, a metaphor for loneliness. In another scene, he attempts to draw a heart on his bathroom cabinet's glass door, but cannot finish the heart, as at this point, sadness and grief have taken over. His furniture can also be seen with drapes over each piece, as well as the curtains drawn, another lonely metaphor.

The video was filmed at the Carrington Hotel in New South Wales, Australia, which was empty and derelict at the time.

== Track listing ==
7″: Columbia / 38 07773 (US)
No.	Title	Writer(s)	Length
1.	"One More Try"	George Michael	5:50
2.	"Look at Your Hands"	Michael; David Austin	4:34

7": Epic / EMU 5 (UK)
No.	Title	Length
1.	"One More Try"	5:49
2.	"Look At Your Hands"	4:36

== Personnel ==
Personnel taken from Faith liner notes.

- George Michael – vocals, arranger, producer
- Chris Cameron – keyboards
- Deon Estus – bass guitar

== Charts ==
=== Weekly charts ===
Weekly chart performance for "One More Try"
Chart (1988–1989)	Peak position
Australia (Australian Music Report)	34
Austria (Ö3 Austria Top 40)	19
Belgium (Ultratop 50 Flanders)	3
Brazil (ABPD)	10
Canada Top Singles (RPM)	1
Canada Adult Contemporary (RPM)	1
Europe (European Hot 100 Singles)	12
Finland (Suomen virallinen lista)	7
France (SNEP)	5
Iceland (Íslenski Listinn Topp 10)	7
Ireland (IRMA)	1
Italy Airplay (Music & Media)	20
Netherlands (Dutch Top 40)	4
Netherlands (Single Top 100)	4
New Zealand (Recorded Music NZ)	8
Norway (VG-lista)	7
Spain (PROMUSICAE)	20
Sweden (Sverigetopplistan)	4
Switzerland (Schweizer Hitparade)	4
UK Singles (Official Charts)	8
US Billboard Hot 100	1
US Adult Contemporary (Billboard)	1
US Hot Black Singles (Billboard)	1
West Germany (GfK)	22

=== Year-end charts ===
Year-end chart performance for "One More Try"
Chart (1988)	Position
Belgium (Ultratop Flanders)	22
Europe (European Hot 100 Singles)	35
Netherlands (Dutch Top 40)	26
Netherlands (Single Top 100)	38
US Billboard Hot 100	11
US Adult Contemporary (Billboard)	20
US Hot Black Singles (Billboard)	37

== Certifications ==
Certifications for "One More Try"
Region	Certification	Certified units/sales
France (SNEP)	Silver	250,000^{*}
United Kingdom (BPI)	Silver	200,000^{‡}
United States (RIAA)	Gold	500,000^{^}
^{*} Sales figures based on certification alone.^{^} Shipments figures based on certification alone.^{‡} Sales+streaming figures based on certification alone.

== Divine version ==
"One More Try"

Single by Divine

from the album Fairy Tales
- Released: 26 January 1999
- Recorded: 1998
- Genre: R&B
- Length: 5:03
- Label: Pendulum
- Songwriter: George Michael
- Producers: John Howcott; Donald Parks

Divine singles chronology
"Lately" (1998)	"One More Try" (1999)

In 1999, American teen trio Divine released the song as the second single off their only album Fairy Tales.

=== Track listing ===
1. "One More Try" – 6:00
2. "One More Try" (extended version) – 9:00
3. "One More Try" (a cappella version) – 4:50

=== Charts ===
Chart performance for "One More Try" by Divine
Chart (1999)	Peak position
US Billboard Hot 100	29
US Hot R&B/Hip-Hop Songs (Billboard)	13

=== Release history ===
Release dates and formats for "One More Try"
Region	Date	Format	Label	Ref.
United States	26 January 1999	Rhythmic contemporary radio	Columbia	
United States	16 March 1999	CD	Columbia	

== Beverley Knight version ==
"One More Try"

Single by Beverley Knight

from the album Soul UK
- Released: 23 October 2011
- Recorded: 2011
- Length: 5:43
- Label: Hurricane
- Songwriter: George Michael
- Producer: Martin Terefe

Beverley Knight singles chronology
"Cuddly Toy" (2011)	"One More Try" (2011)	"Round and Around" (2012)

British singer and songwriter Beverley Knight covered "One More Try" and released it as the third single release from her seventh studio album, Soul UK, a tribute to UK soul artists. It was released in the UK on 23 October 2011. The B-sides are remixes of Freeez's single "Southern Freeez", the original of which also appears on Soul UK.

=== Background ===
In regards to her version of "One More Try", Knight said "Everyone knew who George Michael was, but this song is when he became the real thing in my mind. He channelled a gospel sound, black America, ate it up, Britain followed and then the whole world. I took that sound, and going back to my own church roots, I ran with it." George Michael endorsed Knight's version of "One More Try" stating, "I'm always flattered by cover versions of my songs – especially when they are sung as beautifully as this. Thank You Beverley".

=== Track listing ===
Digital download

1. "One More Try" (album version) – 5:43
2. "Southern Freeez" (Soulseekers club mix) – 7:17
3. "Southern Freeez" (Soulseekers radio edit) – 3:28
4. "Southern Freeez" (MCM Funky Freeez radio edit) – 3:18

iTunes digital download

1. "One More Try" (album version) – 5:43
2. "Southern Freeez" (Soulseekers club mix) – 7:17
3. "Southern Freeez" (Soulseekers dub) – 7:17
4. "Southern Freeez" (MCM Funky Freeez radio edit) – 3:18

Other versions

1. "One More Try" (radio edit)

=== Release history ===
Region	Date	Format
United Kingdom	23 October 2011	Digital download

== Other cover versions ==
- 1997: Joan Baez
- 2000: Divine
- 2003: Hazel O'Connor for her first-ever official best of compilation, A Singular Collection
- 2011: Iron & Wine (for The A.V. Club's A.V. Undercover web series)
- 2011: Stacy Francis on first season of The X Factor USA
- 2011: Beverley Knight
- 2014: Mariah Carey recorded the song for her album Me. I Am Mariah... The Elusive Chanteuse.
- 2014: Josh Kaufman
- 2022: Calum Scott
- 2022: Crosses
- 2023: Carrie Underwood performed the song at the Rock and Roll Hall of Fame ceremony to honour Michael's induction.
