= I Heard =

I Heard may refer to:

- "I Heard" (song), a song by Hill
- I Heard (film), a 1933 animated short film starring Betty Boop
