= Baby, Come Over (This Is Our Night) =

2001 single by Samantha Mumba

Single by Samantha Mumba

from the album Gotta Tell You
- Released: 20 February 2001
- Genre: Club
- Length: 3:33
- Label: Wildcard; Polydor; A&M
- Songwriters: Samantha Mumba; Anders Bagge; Arnthor Birgisson
- Producers: Anders Bagge; Arnthor Birgisson; Dino Esposito; E. Dawk; Ron Fair

Samantha Mumba singles chronology
"Always Come Back to Your Love" (2001)	"Baby, Come Over (This Is Our Night)" (2001)	"Don't Need You To (Tell Me I'm Pretty)" (2001)

Audio video
- "Baby, Come Over (This Is Our Night)" on YouTube

"Baby, Come Over (This Is Our Night)" (released outside the United States as "Baby Come on Over") is a song by Irish singer Samantha Mumba, from her debut studio album, Gotta Tell You (2000). The song was written by Mumba, Anders Bagge, and Arnthor Birgisson while production was helmed by Bagge, Birgisson, Dino Esposito, E. Dawk, and Ron Fair. It was released by A&M Records as the album's third single in the United States and by Wildcard and Polydor Records as the fourth single in the United Kingdom. A club anthem, the song consists of a bass guitar and salsa beat, and contains a sample of Kool & the Gang's 1979 song "Ladies' Night" in the remix. The lyrics depict a woman making the first move on a man.

Released in the US in February 2001 and in the UK in September, "Baby, Come Over (This Is Our Night)" received generally positive reviews from music critics, who praised the production. The song peaked at number two on the Irish Singles Chart, number five on the UK Singles Chart, number six on the Scottish Singles Chart, and at number 49 on the US Billboard Hot 100. An accompanying music video was directed by Korean-American director Joseph Kahn and aired on Disney Channel, which depicts Mumba dancing in front of various backgrounds with several dancers.

== Background and release ==
"Baby, Come Over (This Is Our Night)" was one of the first songs Samantha Mumba wrote and recorded in Sweden for her debut studio album Gotta Tell You (2000). The song was written by Mumba, Anders Bagge and Arnthor Birgisson, and produced by the latter two, Dino Esposito, E. Dawk, and Ron Fair. Samantha and Jeanette Olsson additionally provide background vocals. In a 2000 interview with Billboard, Mumba stated that the song "shows a bit of my personality more than anything else". Fair oversaw Mumba re-record her vocals to "Baby, Come Over (This Is Our Night)", which was included in a repackaged edition of Gotta Tell You in the United States on 27 March 2001. He reasoned that his decision to revise the song would increase her popularity in the country since "no one knew who she was."

"Baby, Come Over (This Is Our Night)" was serviced to rhythmic contemporary and contemporary hit radio stations in the United States on 20 February 2001. Overseas in Japan, the song was released as the album's second single on 28 March 2001. On 3 September 2001, the song was issued as a CD single in Australia. In the United Kingdom, it was released as a remixed version on 10 September 2001, that was not included on initial pressings of Gotta Tell You.

== Composition and critical reception ==
"Baby, Come Over (This Is Our Night)" is a bass-heavy club anthem, with lyrics describing a woman attempting to make the first move on a man. The remix samples the chorus of American band Kool & the Gang's 1979 song "Ladies' Night" in the midsection. According to the sheet music published at Musicnotes.com by Alfred Music, it is based on 4/4 common time, with a tempo of 96 beats per minute, while composed in the key of F major. Mumba's vocal range spans from the low note of D_{3} to the high note of D♭_{5}, while the song is constructed in verse–chorus form.

Writing on the 3 March 2001, issue of Billboard about the promotional release of "Baby, Come Over (This Is Our Night)" in the United States, Chuck Taylor opined that the production is a "change of pace" for pop radio stations, and praised the instrumental layers and salsa beat which contrasted other songs that received airplay during the same time period. He additionally complimented Mumba's "confident [and] playful" vocals for "transcend[ing] her age". Writing in an album review for Gotta Tell You, Stephen Thomas Erlewine of AllMusic considered it to be a "stand out" track. Jaya Sharma of The Town Talk was surprised by "Baby, Come Over (This Is Our Night)" and questioned Mumba's status as a one-hit wonder. The Weekender correspondent Jim Luft negatively labelled the title as "trite" and the song's content as "boring".

== Commercial performance ==
"Baby, Come Over (This Is Our Night)" debuted at the number five peak on the UK Singles Chart dated 22 September 2001, where it charted for 10 weeks. On the Irish Singles Chart, the song peaked at number two, while it also bowed at number six on the Scottish Singles Chart in its first week before remaining on the chart for 14 weeks. On the Swiss Singles Chart, "Baby, Come Over (This Is Our Night)" debuted on the chart dated 7 October 2001. It peaked at number 67 on the chart dated 21 October 2001, and charted for four weeks.

On the Australian ARIA Singles Chart, "Baby, Come Over (This Is Our Night)" first entered the chart at number 39 on the chart dated 16 September 2001. It peaked at number 35 on the chart dated 7 October 2001, and remained for six weeks. The song bowed at number 50 on the Official New Zealand Music Chart for one week on the chart dated 14 October 2001. In the United States, "Baby, Come Over (This Is Our Night)" peaked at number 49 on the Billboard Hot 100 chart dated 9 June 2001, where it remained for 17 weeks. It peaked at number 14 on the Dance Club Songs chart and bowed at number 16 on the Mainstream Top 40.

== Music video ==
An accompanying music video was directed by Joseph Kahn, which depicts Mumba and several dancers in different scenes such as in front of an orange background, giant steps above water, and in a multi-coloured room viewed through a first-person perspective of a telescope. She holds a microphone while standing in a blue hallway with white holes splattered on the walls.

The music video aired on Disney Channel and was promoted through Mumba performing on a Disney Channel In Concert special with Aaron Carter on 30 March 2001, which subsequently received heavy rotation. The video also premiered on MTV on the week ending on 1 April 2001.

== Track listings ==
International CD single

No.	Title	Length
1.	"Baby Come on Over" (New Version)	3:35
2.	"Baby Come on Over" (ATFC Chilled Vintage Vocal)	6:50
3.	"Gotta Tell You" (Sleaze Sisters Mix)	6:50
4.	"Baby Come on Over" (Video)

International maxi single

No.	Title	Length
1.	"Baby Come on Over" (New Version)	3:33
2.	"Baby Come on Over"	3:03
3.	"Believe in Me"	3:31
4.	"The Way It Makes You Feel"	3:29

UK cassette single

No.	Title	Length
1.	"Baby Come on Over" (New Version)	3:33
2.	"Baby Come on Over" (AFTC Chilled Vintage Vocal)	6:48

== Personnel ==
Personnel are adapted from the back cover of "Baby Come on Over".

Recording

- Mixed at Murlyn Studios

Personnel

- Samantha Mumba – songwriting
- Anders Bagge – songwriting, production
- Arnthor Birgisson – songwriting, production, mixing
- Dino Esposito – production
- E. Dawk – production
- Ron Fair – production
- Samantha Olsson – background vocals
- Jeanette Olsson – background vocals
- Aaron Chakraverty – mastering

== Charts ==
=== Weekly charts ===
Weekly chart performance for "Baby, Come Over (This Is Our Night)"
Chart (2001)	Peak position
Australia (ARIA)	35
Australian Urban (ARIA)	10
Belgium (Ultratip Bubbling Under Flanders)	2
Ireland (IRMA)	2
New Zealand (Recorded Music NZ)	50
Scottish Singles Sales (Official Charts)	6
Switzerland (Schweizer Hitparade)	67
UK Singles (Official Charts)	5
US Billboard Hot 100	49
US Dance Club Play (Billboard)	14
US Mainstream Top 40 (Billboard)	16

=== Year-end charts ===
Year-end chart performance for "Baby, Come Over (This Is Our Night)"
Chart (2001)	Position
Ireland (IRMA)	60
UK Singles (OCC)	133
US Mainstream Top 40 (Billboard)	77

== Release history ==
Release dates and formats for "Baby, Come Over (This Is Our Night)"
Region	Date	Format(s)	Label	Ref.
United States	20 February 2001	Contemporary hit radio; rhythmic contemporary radio	A&M	
Japan	28 March 2001	CD single	Universal Music Japan	
Australia	3 September 2001	CD single	Wildcard; Polydor	
United Kingdom	10 September 2001	CD single; cassette single	Wildcard; Polydor	
