= Payot =

Hebrew term for sidelocks or sideburns

Peot פֵּאוֹת (pe’ot) סִימָנִים (simanim)
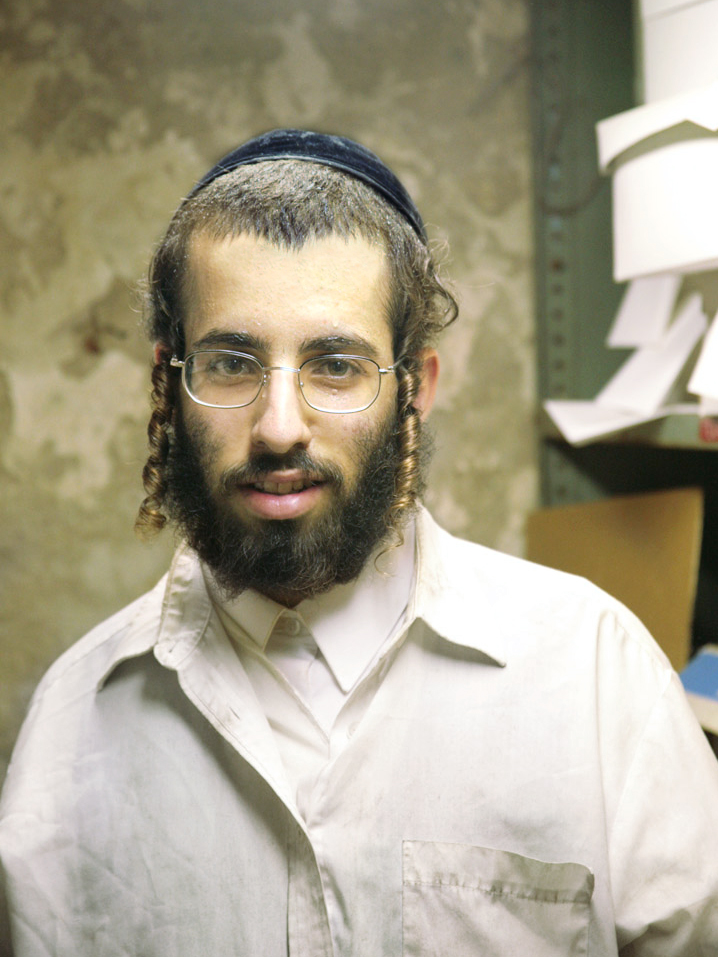
- A young Hasidic Jew

Halakhic texts relating to this article
- Torah: Leviticus 19:27
- Babylonian Talmud: Makkot 20a–20b
- Mishneh Torah: Avodath Kokhavim 12:6
- Shulchan Aruch: Yoreh De'ah 181

Payots, often anglicized as pe'ot (Hebrew: פֵּאוֹת, romanized: pēʾōt, lit. 'corners') or payes (Note: Also spelled peot, peyot, peyes, payes, payos, peyos, peyois, payois) (Yiddish: פּאות, romanized: pejəs), are sidelocks or sideburns. Pe'ot are worn by some male adherents of Orthodox Judaism based on an interpretation of the Tanakhic injunction—in Leviticus 19:27—against shaving the "sides" of one's head. The singular form of the Hebrew pe'ot, pe'a (פֵּאָה), means 'corner', 'side', or 'edge'. There are different styles of pe'ot among adherents of Haredi Judaism and Hasidic Judaism, as well as among Yemenite Jews, and Chardal Jews. Yemenite Jews call their sidelocks simanim (סִימָנִים, 'signs') because their long, curled sidelocks serve as a distinguishing feature in Yemenite society (differentiating them from their Gentile neighbors).

== Rabbinic interpretation ==
=== Reason ===
According to Maimonides, shaving the sidelocks was a heathen practice.

=== Specifics ===
The Torah says, "you shall not round off the pe'a of your head (פְּאַת רֹאשְׁכֶם)". The word pe'a was taken to mean the hair in front of the ears extending to beneath the cheekbone, on a level with the nose (Talmud – Makkot 20a). The Mishnah interpreted the regulation as applying only to men. Thus it became the custom in certain circles to allow the hair over the ears to grow, and hang down in curls or ringlets. There is considerable discussion in the halachic literature as to the precise location of the payot and of the ways in which their removal is prohibited.

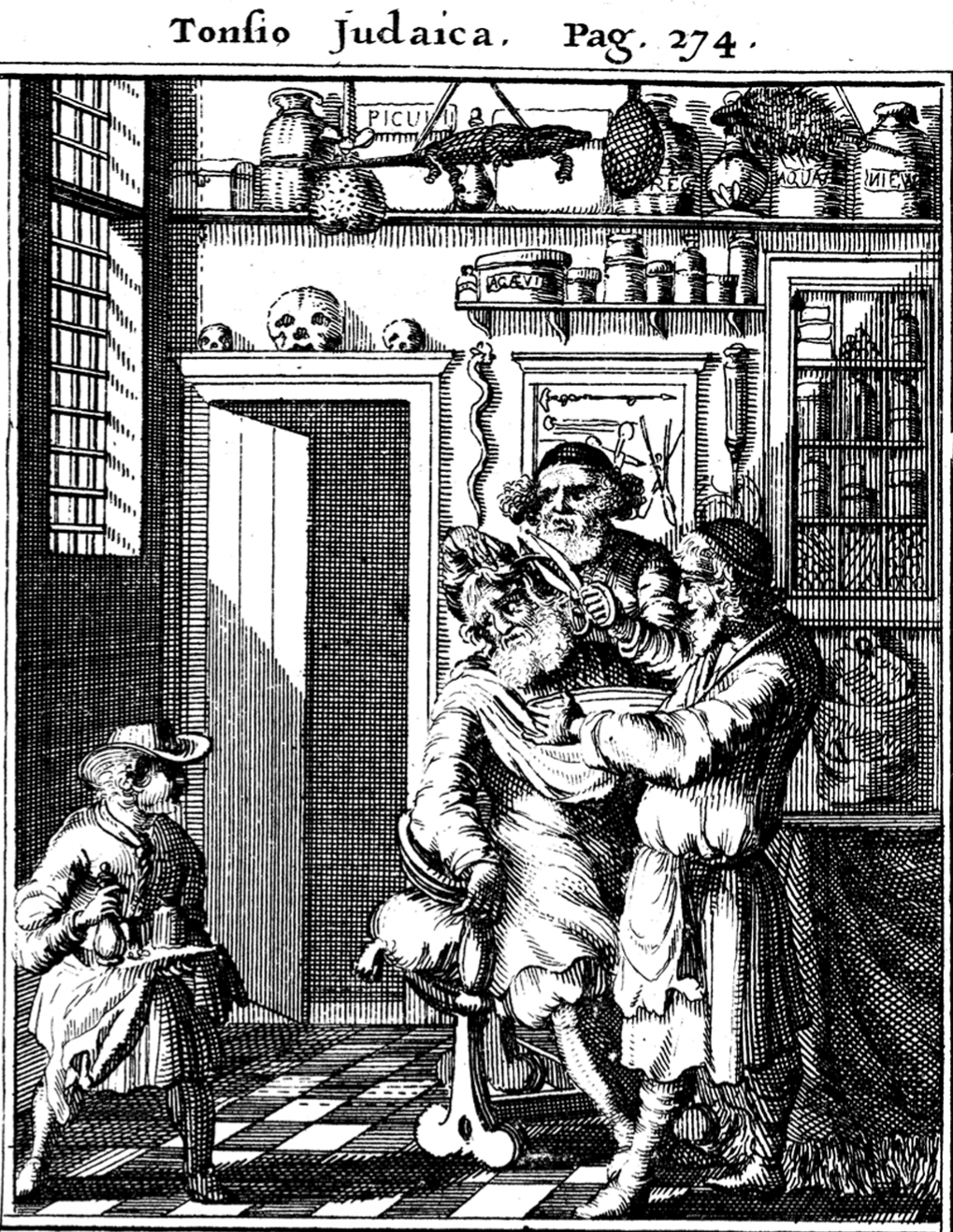
Jewish haircut (1657)

== Specifics by communities ==
As kabbalistic teachings spread into Slavonic lands, the custom of pe'ot became accepted there. In 1845, the practice was banned in the Russian Empire.

Crimean Karaites did not wear payot, and the Crimean Tatars consequently referred to them as zulufsız çufutlar ("Jews without payot"), to distinguish them from the Krymchaks, referred to as zuluflı çufutlar ("Jews with payot").

Many Hasidic and Yemenite ("Teimani") Jews let their sidelocks grow particularly long. Some Haredi men grow sidelocks, but trim them or tuck them behind the ears.

Even in some communities where peot are not customary among the men, young boys may grow them until the age of bar mitzvah.

== Styles ==
The lengths and maintenance of the pe'ot vary noticeably among Jewish groups.

=== Yemenite Jews ===
- Some traditional Yemenite Jews still wear distinctive long and thin twisted locks, often reaching to the upper arm. The actual area where the hair grows and where the ringlet begins is neat and tidy.

=== Hasidic groups ===
- Satmar Jews have notably thicker sidelocks. They also tend to tuck their sidelocks behind their ears.
- Belz Hasidim wrap their sidelocks around their ears as many times as necessary without trimming.
- Many Breslov Hasidim wear long twisted locks as did their Rabbi, Nachman of Breslov. However, others wear different styles in line with the teaching of Rabbi Nachman that his followers do not have to have a uniform garb.
- The Chabad-Lubavitch Hasidim's payot are not evident, but they exist. So long as there is hair around the ear and behind it that can be plucked out, that is considered payot.
- Some Gerer Hasidim raise their sidelocks from the temples and tuck them under their yarmulke. Others, especially in Israel, let them hang down.
- The Skver Hasidim twist their sidelocks into a tight coil, and leave them protruding in front of the ear.

Most other Hasidic groups wear their payot down and curled.

=== Lithuanian groups ===
The Lithuanian Jews are less influenced by Kabbalistic practises, but still retain sidelocks to a degree, in a small number of variant styles:

- Lithuanian Jews often cut their sidelocks, but leave a bunch of strands uncut, and place them behind the ear; this style is most commonly found among yeshiva students, who sometimes remove the uncut strands when they have grown sideburns.
- The Brisk movement's members brush their hair straight down, usually so that it reaches to the ear lobe; sometimes, some of the sidelock is not cut, and is curled back behind the ear.

== Gallery ==
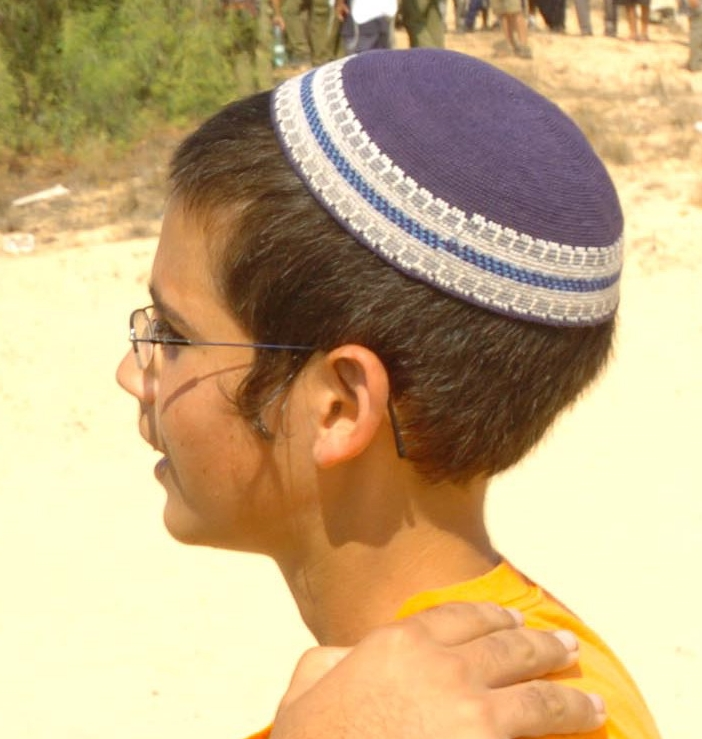
Pre-bar mitzvah age boy with payot

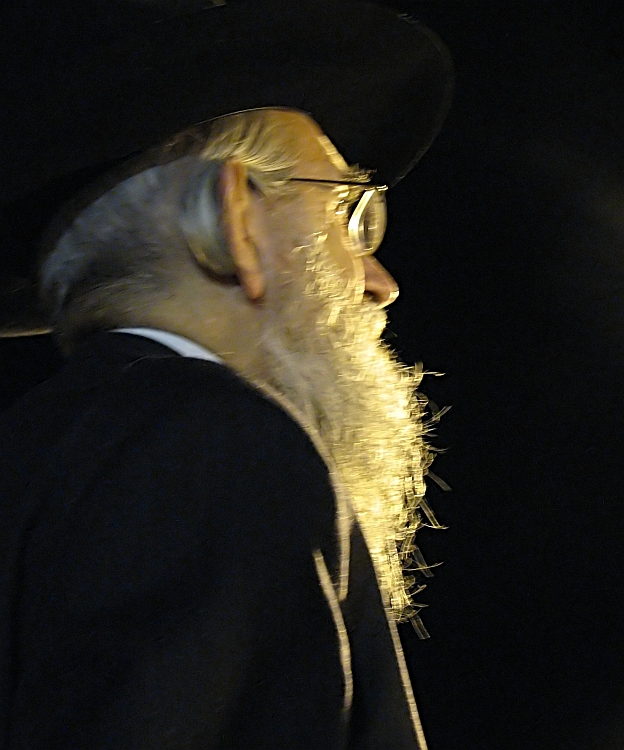
A religious Jew with beard and payot tucked behind ear

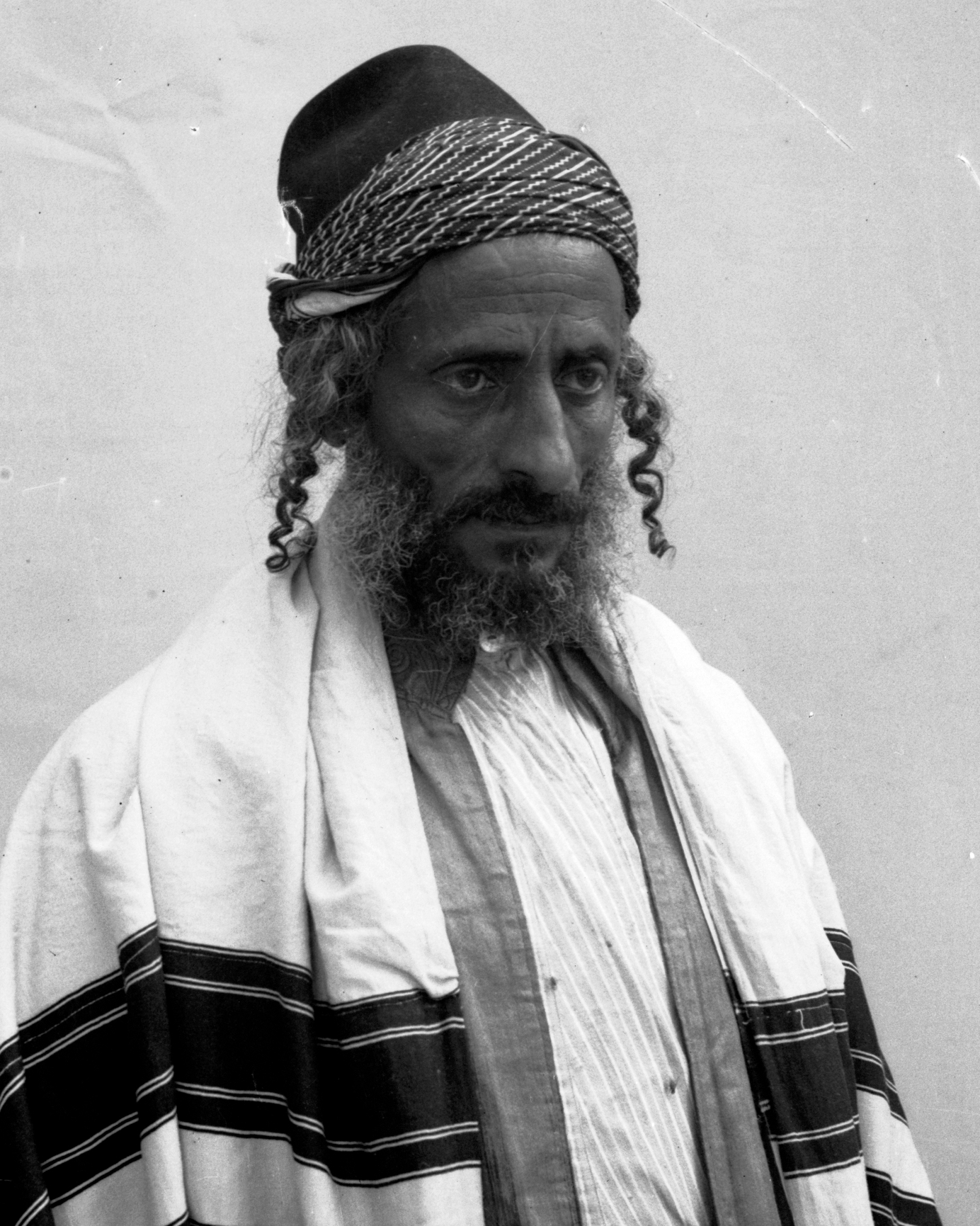
A Teimani (Yemenite) Jew with payot

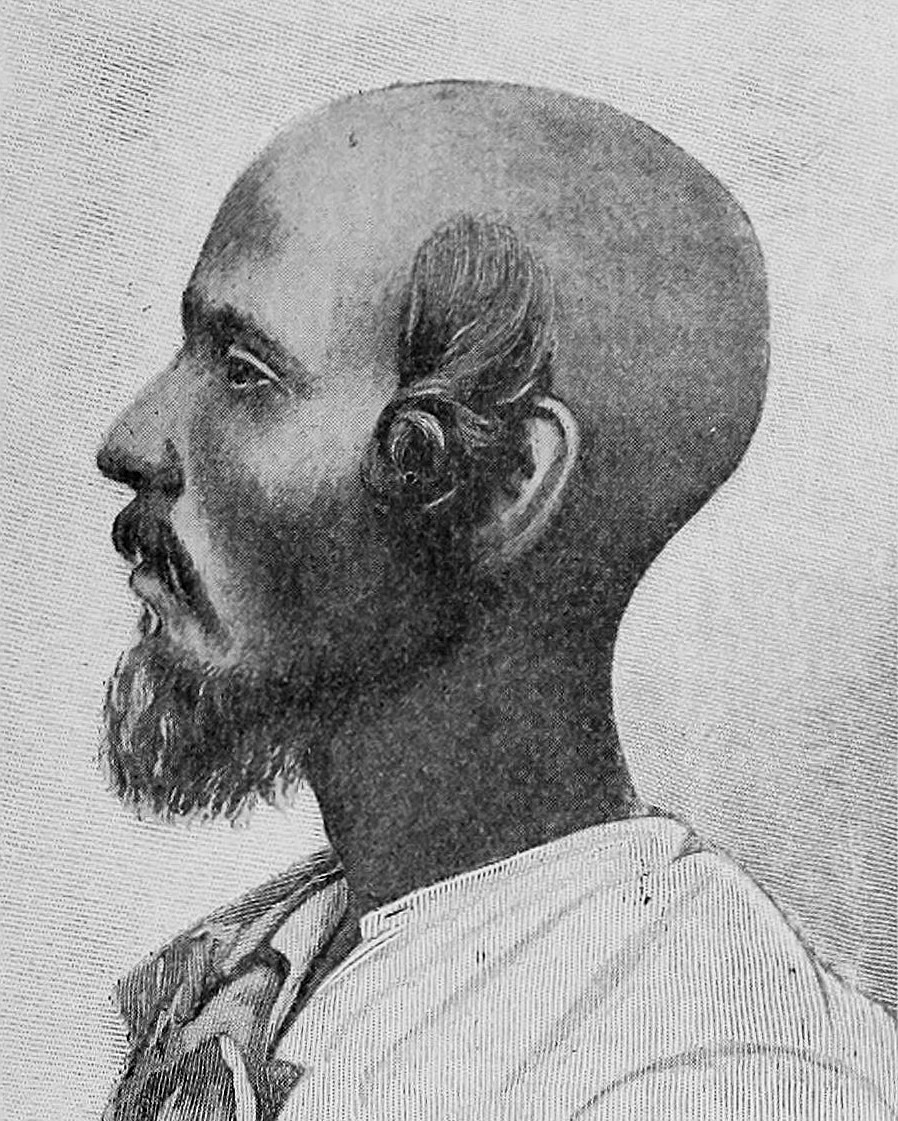
A Jew with payot from Kochi, India, 1900

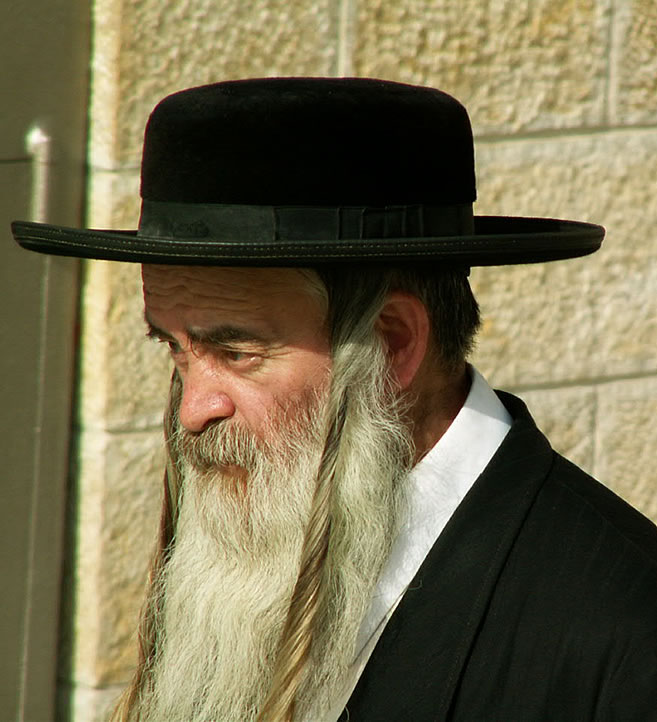
A religious Jew with payot, Jerusalem, Israel

== See also ==
- 613 mitzvot
- Shaving in Judaism
- Upsherin
- List of hairstyles

== References and notes ==
Notes
