= Lately (Divine song) =

1998 single by Divine

Single by Divine

from the album Fairy Tales
- B-side: "My Love"
- Released: August 10, 1998
- Genre: R&B
- Length: 4:18
- Label: Pendulum, Red Ant Entertainment
- Songwriters: Christopher Kelly, Will Baker
- Producers: John Howcott, Donald Parks

Divine singles chronology
"Lately" (1998)	"One More Try" (1999)

"Lately" is a song by American R&B girl group Divine, released as the group's debut single on August 10, 1998, from their only studio album, Fairy Tales. Written by Christopher Kelly and Will Baker, the Hammond organ-driven R&B song is a pensive reflection on lost love produced by John Howcott and Donald Parks.

"Lately" peaked at number one on the US Billboard Hot 100 for one week in November 1998. Music critics responded favorably to the track, praising the group's vocal performance. "Lately" was eventually released to international markets, but it failed to make as big of an impact as it did in the US. In 2001, a cover version by Irish singer Samantha Mumba found chart success in Ireland and the United Kingdom.

== Background and composition ==
Before "Lately" was written, producers John Howcott and Donald Parks, who had previously worked with American singer-songwriter Keith Sweat, formed a company called Urban Vibe. Afterwards, they recruited Indianapolis natives Pete Woodruff and Will Baker, who had a connection with Babyface, and began working on "Lately". Alongside his longtime friend, Christopher Kelly, Baker wrote the track about his days in high school, when he and his girlfriend, whom he eventually married, explored the dynamic extremes of their relationship. When Red Ant Entertainment founder Ruben Rodriguez heard the song's demo tape, he expressed interest in the composition and took it to Divine, a female music trio he had recently signed to the label. The group, consisting of Nikki Bratcher, Tonia Tash, and Kia Thornton, recorded the song across three locations, including Indianapolis.

"Lately" is an R&B love song with blues influences, driven by a guitar and Hammond B3 organ played by Woodruff. Chuck Taylor of Billboard noted that the song stands out from most hip hop tracks and female-sung ballads of the time, and Red Ant's president, Randy Phillips, compared it to a 1999 incarnation of Otis Redding's "(Sittin' On) The Dock of the Bay". The track's lyrics discuss an ended relation that the narrator reflects upon wistfully. Woodruff, Baker, and Howcott provide addition keyboards while Marcus Williams and Baker collaborated on the drums and drum programming, respectively. Alongside Mark South, Baker also arranged the vocals and co-produced the track with Woodruff. Divine sing all lead and background vocals on the track, and additional vocals are provided by Talonda Fields. Other personnel who worked on the song include four audio engineers, mixer Jonnie Most, and Lynn Goldsmith, who photographed the song's American cover artwork.

== Release and promotion ==
A month before "Lately" was added to radio, its music video was added to the playlists of BET and The Box. Pendulum Records and Red Ant Entertainment serviced "Lately" to US urban radio on August 10, 1998, and to rhythmic contemporary radio on August 25. A two-format physical release soon followed. On both releases, a CD single and a cassette single, the album version of "Lately" is accompanied by an instrumental version, an alternative mix of album track "My Love", and various snippets from Fairy Tales. On October 6, 1998, the song was added to contemporary hit radio. Almost a year later, on October 4, 1999, the single was issued in the United Kingdom across two CDs and a cassette. These releases contain assorted remixes of "Lately", as does the Australian CD, which was distributed through Mushroom Records in Pendulum's stead. To promote the song and album, Divine embarked on a US tour in late 1998 and appeared on several television programs.

== Reception ==
=== Critical reception ===
Tom Breihan of Stereogum reviewed the song in his "The Number Ones" column, calling the track "good" and praising its vocals and sound. He went on to write that some of the lyrics are "banal", particularly the line "If loving you is right, then I don't wanna go wrong," but stated that the overall mood is the more crucial focal point of a track like "Lately", rating it 7 out of 10. In Radio & Records magazine, Stan Branson wrote that the track is a "deserved" number-one hit, complimenting Divine's vocals and comparing them to those of the Emotions and the Jones Girls. Melisa Stefas of Las Vegas radio station KLUC-FM said that the song provides mass appeal to women, noting its emotional impact, while Bobby Nichols of WIIZ in South Carolina praised the group's harmonies, calling the song "legitimate". In October 2020, Cleveland.com placed the song at number 115 (out of 140) on their "Every No. 1 Song of the 1990s Ranked from Worst to Best" list, calling the track a "gospel song masquerading as an R&B jam".

=== Chart performance ===
Following its commercial release, "Lately" debuted at number 36 on the US Billboard Hot 100 on September 12, 1998. Over the next few weeks, it rose up the chart, entering the top 20 in early October and the top 10 later that month. On November 28, the song ascended to the number-one spot for that week only with sales of 82,000, becoming the first number-one single for Divine, the songwriters, the producers, and the record labels. The single spent 27 weeks on the Hot 100 and appeared on the year-end charts for both 1998 and 1999, at numbers 61 and 31, respectively. On December 7, 1998, the song was certified platinum by the Recording Industry Association of America (RIAA) for shipping over one million units domestically, selling about 100,000 more copies by the end of January 1999.

On other Billboard listings, "Lately" reached number two on the Hot R&B Singles chart, number four on the Rhythmic Top 40 chart, and number 11 on the Mainstream Top 40. The track also found popularity in dance clubs, allowing it to peak at number 46 on the Dance Club Play ranking. In Canada, the single reached number 47 on the RPM 100 Hit Tracks chart and number 25 on the RPM Dance ranking. Outside North America, the song first charted in Germany in December 1998, peaking at number 75 the following month. In late 1999, the song reached the top 50 in Australia and New Zealand while also appearing on the singles charts of the Netherlands and the United Kingdom. Divine would release only one more single, a cover of George Michael's "One More Try", before their record label dissolved in 1999.

== Track listings ==
US CD and cassette single

1. "Lately" (album version) – 4:18
2. "Lately" (instrumental) – 5:16
3. "My Love" (master mix) – 4:51
4. Snippets taken from the album Fairy Tales – 4:41

UK CD1

1. "Lately" (Stargate radio mix)
2. "Lately" (original mix)
3. "Lately" (rap club mix)

UK CD2

1. "Lately" (rap club mix)
2. "Lately" (Raphael Saadiq remix)
3. "Lately" (Stargate radio mix)

Australian CD single

1. "Lately" (radio edit)
2. "Lately" (Stargate mix)
3. "Lately" (main edit)
4. "Lately" (instrumental)

== Personnel ==
Personnel are lifted from the US CD single liner notes and the Fairy Tales album booklet.

- Christopher Kelly – writing
- Will and Pete – co-production
  - Will Baker – writing, keyboards, Hammond B3, drum programming, vocal arrangement
  - Pete Woodruff – keyboards, drum programming
- Divine – vocals, background vocals
- Talonda Fields – additional vocals
- John Howcott – keyboards, production, engineering
- Marcus Williams – drums
- Donald Parks – production, engineering
- Jonnie Most – mixing
- Mark South – vocal arrangement
- Alex Nesmith – engineering
- Jim Zumpano – engineering
- Mike Simmons – engineering
- Daniel Boom – assistant engineering
- Lynn Goldsmith – photography

== Charts ==
=== Weekly charts ===
Chart (1998–1999)	Peak position
Australia (ARIA)	50
Canada Top Singles (RPM)	47
Canada Dance/Urban (RPM)	25
Germany (GfK)	75
Netherlands (Dutch Top 40 Tipparade)	4
Netherlands (Single Top 100)	51
New Zealand (Recorded Music NZ)	20
UK Singles (Official Charts)	52
UK Indie (Official Charts)	4
UK Hip Hop/R&B (Official Charts)	5
US Billboard Hot 100	1
US Dance Club Songs (Billboard)	46
US Hot R&B/Hip-Hop Songs (Billboard)	2
US Pop Airplay (Billboard)	11
US Rhythmic Airplay (Billboard)	4

=== Year-end charts ===
Chart (1998)	Position
US Billboard Hot 100	61
US Hot R&B Singles (Billboard)	33
US Rhythmic Top 40 (Billboard)	48

Chart (1999)	Position
US Billboard Hot 100	31
US Hot R&B/Hip-Hop Singles & Tracks (Billboard)	58
US Mainstream Top 40 (Billboard)	45
US Rhythmic Top 40 (Billboard)	41

=== Decade-end charts ===
Chart (1990–1999)	Position
US Billboard Hot 100	84

== Certifications ==
Region	Certification	Certified units/sales
United States (RIAA)	Platinum	1,100,000

== Release history ==
Region	Date	Format(s)	Label(s)	Ref(s).
United States	August 10, 1998	Urban radio	Pendulum; Red Ant Entertainment	
United States	August 25, 1998	Rhythmic contemporary radio	Pendulum; Red Ant Entertainment	
United States	1998	CD; cassette	Pendulum; Red Ant Entertainment	
United States	October 6, 1998	Contemporary hit radio	Pendulum; Red Ant Entertainment	
United Kingdom	October 4, 1999	CD; cassette	Red Ant Entertainment	

== Samantha Mumba version ==
"Lately"

Single by Samantha Mumba

from the album Gotta Tell You
- Released: December 10, 2001
- Length: 5:10
- Label: Polydor, Wildcard
- Songwriters: Christopher Kelly, Will Baker
- Producer: Steve Mac

Samantha Mumba singles chronology
"Don't Need You To (Tell Me I'm Pretty)" (2001)	"Lately" (2001)	"I'm Right Here" (2002)

Audio video
- "Lately" on YouTube

Irish singer Samantha Mumba released her version of "Lately" on her debut album, Gotta Tell You (2000). "Lately" was the fifth and final single released from Gotta Tell You internationally on December 10, 2001. Mumba's version peaked at number three in Ireland and number six on the UK Singles Chart.

=== Music video ===
In the music video, the scenes flash between Mumba singing and a wall calendar flipping down the days. After Mumba's initial close-ups, she turns her head, and the video pans to an Asian man's photo hanging on a wall, which continues to show up throughout the clip. Later in the video, Mumba is shown in front of a dancing choir. At the end of the video, the camera zooms out from Mumba's face.

=== Track listings ===
UK CD single

1. "Lately" (radio edit) – 3:54
2. "Lately" (Ralphi's Vox 12-inch vocal club mix) – 7:03
3. "Lately" (Junior Jack club mix) – 7:04
4. "Lately" (CD-ROM)

UK cassette single

1. "Lately" (radio edit) – 3:54
2. "Lately" (Ralphi's Vox 12-inch) – 7:03
3. "Lately" (Stuntmasterz vocal mix) – 7:03

=== Charts ===
==== Weekly charts ====
Chart (2001–2002)	Peak position
Europe (Eurochart Hot 100)	38
Ireland (IRMA)	3
Scottish Singles Sales (Official Charts)	6
UK Singles (Official Charts)	6
UK Hip Hop/R&B (Official Charts)	2

==== Year-end charts ====
Chart (2001)	Position
Ireland (IRMA)	66
UK Singles (OCC)	143

Chart (2002)	Position
Ireland (IRMA)	87
UK Singles (OCC)	178
