= Body II Body =

2000 single by Samantha Mumba

Single by Samantha Mumba

from the album Gotta Tell You
- B-side: "Believe in Me"; "The Way It Makes You Feel"
- Released: 16 October 2000
- Studio: The Strongroom, Stanley House (London, England); Bluetone (Somerville, Massachusetts)
- Length: 4:00
- Label: Wildcard; Polydor
- Songwriters: Lukas Burton; Sacha Skarbek; David Bowie
- Producer: Lukas Burton

Samantha Mumba singles chronology
"Gotta Tell You" (2000)	"Body II Body" (2000)	"Always Come Back to Your Love" (2001)

Audio video
- "Body II Body" on YouTube

"Body II Body" (pronounced "body to body") is a song by Irish singer Samantha Mumba, released as the second single from her debut album, Gotta Tell You (2000), on 16 October 2000. David Bowie's 1980 song "Ashes to Ashes" is sampled heavily in the song. "Body II Body" reached number two in Ireland, number five in the United Kingdom, number nine in Iceland, and number 14 in Australia.

== Track listings ==
UK and Australian CD1

1. "Body II Body" – 3:57
2. "Believe in Me" – 3:31
3. "The Way It Makes You Feel" – 3:30
4. "Body II Body" (CD-ROM video)

UK CD2

1. "Body II Body" (radio edit) – 3:15
2. "Body II Body" (Robbie Rivera's vocal mix) – 7:10
3. "Body II Body" (Tall Paul vocal mix) – 6:32

UK cassette single

1. "Body II Body" (radio edit) – 3:15
2. "Body II Body" (Oxide mix) – 5:23

European CD single

1. "Body II Body" (radio edit) – 3:15
2. "Body II Body" (Soul Inside Bounce mix) – 5:42

French CD single

1. "Body II Body" (radio edit) – 3:15
2. "Gotta Tell You" – 3:20

Australian CD2

1. "Body II Body" (radio edit) – 3:15
2. "Body II Body" (Robbie Rivera's vocal mix) – 7:10
3. "Body II Body" (Soul Inside Bounce mix) – 5:42
4. "Body II Body" (Soul Inside Smooth mix) – 6:32
5. "Body II Body" (Flex mix) – 7:32

== Credits and personnel ==
Credits are lifted from the UK CD1 liner notes.

Studios

- Recorded at The Strongroom, Stanley House (London, England), and Bluetone Studios (Somerville, Massachusetts)
- Mixed at Stanley House (London, England)
- Mastered at 777 Productions (London, England)

Personnel

- Lukas Burton – writing, production
- Sacha Skarbek – writing, co-production
- David Bowie – writing ("Ashes to Ashes")
- Michelle John Douglas – backing vocals
- Jayne Tretton – backing vocals
- Charlie Casey – guitar
- Lawrence Johnson – additional vocal production
- Yan Memmi – recording engineer, mix engineering
- Chris Wyles – recording engineer
- Phelan Kane – digital services
- Arun Chakraverty – mastering
- Donald Christie – photography

== Charts ==
=== Weekly charts ===
Chart (2000–2001)	Peak position
Australia (ARIA)	14
Australian Urban (ARIA)	6
Belgium (Ultratip Bubbling Under Flanders)	2
Belgium (Ultratop 50 Wallonia)	40
Europe (Eurochart Hot 100)	22
France (SNEP)	53
Iceland (Íslenski Listinn Topp 40)	9
Ireland (IRMA)	2
Netherlands (Dutch Top 40 Tipparade)	4
New Zealand (Recorded Music NZ)	45
Scottish Singles Sales (Official Charts)	7
Sweden (Sverigetopplistan)	40
Switzerland (Schweizer Hitparade)	58
UK Singles (Official Charts)	5
UK Hip Hop/R&B (Official Charts)	1

=== Year-end charts ===
Chart (2000)	Position
Ireland (IRMA)	48
UK Singles (OCC)	156

== Release history ==
Region	Date	Format(s)	Label(s)	Ref(s).
United Kingdom	16 October 2000	CD; cassette	Polydor; Wildcard	
Australia	8 January 2001	CD1	Polydor; Wildcard	
Australia	26 February 2001	CD2	Polydor; Wildcard	
