= Stay in the Middle =

Single by Hill featuring Samantha Mumba

from the album Filling in the Pages
- Released: August 2009
- Recorded: June 2009
- Genre: Pop
- Length: 3:25
- Label: Sensible Records
- Songwriters: Hill Zaini, Samantha Mumba, Eric Appapulay, Prince Azim
- Producer: Jon Moon

Hill singles chronology
"Stay in the Middle" (2009)	"Buat Selamanya" (2010)

Samantha Mumba singles chronology
"I'm Right Here" (2003)	"Stay in the Middle" (2009)	"Somebody Like Me" (2013)

Music video
- "Stay in the Middle" on YouTube

"Stay in the Middle" is a pop ballad by Hill featuring Samantha Mumba. It is written by Hill Zaini, Samantha Mumba, Eric Appapulay and Prince Azim, and produced by Jon Moon for Hill's debut album, Filling in the Pages (2010). The ballad is Hill's debut single and was released to iTunes in August 2009, with an international release in 2010. The song was a Top 5 hit on Brunei's Pelangi FM chart.

== Background and theme ==
"Stay in the Middle" is about taking chances and holding on to what one has worked hard for. The lyrics are related to Hill's obstacles of having to leave a major music talent show, but never giving up on his dreams.

The song was recorded at Sensible Music Studios and was released under Sensible Records.

== Music video ==
The single's music video, directed by Omero Mumba, was shot in London in December 2009 and features a cameo appearance by US superstar Mariah Carey who is seen in the first 15 seconds. The video follows Hill wandering around a party contemplatively; while Samantha Mumba is breaking up with her boyfriend. It was a recipient of a 2010 AVIMA (Asia Pacific Voice Independent Music Award) for Most Mindblowing Music Video where it came in third place.

== Charts ==
Chart	Peak position
Brunei Pelangi FM	5
