= Don't Need You To (Tell Me I'm Pretty) =

2001 single by Samantha Mumba

Single by Samantha Mumba

from the album Gotta Tell You
- Released: 4 September 2001
- Length: 3:46
- Label: A&M
- Songwriter(s): Diane Warren
- Producer(s): Ron Fair; Sol Survivor; E. Dawk

Samantha Mumba singles chronology
"Baby, Come Over (This Is Our Night)" (2001)	"Don't Need You To (Tell Me I'm Pretty)" (2001)	"Lately" (2001)

Audio video
- "Don't Need You To (Tell Me I'm Pretty)" on YouTube

"Don't Need You To (Tell Me I'm Pretty)" (entitled "I Don't Need You To" on the UK and Japanese album re-issues) is a song by Irish singer Samantha Mumba. The single was released exclusively in the United States as Mumba's third single, and as the fifth overall single from her debut studio album Gotta Tell You (2000) on 4 September 2001. "Don't Need You To (Tell Me I'm Pretty)" was also the official second single to be released from the original motion picture soundtrack to Legally Blonde. The song peaked at number 20 on the US Billboard Hot Singles Sales chart.

== Track listing ==
US single

1. "Don't Need You To (Tell Me I'm Pretty)" – 3:46
2. "The Boy" (Remix) – 4:03
