= Divine (group) =

American R&B girl group

- Genres: R&B
- Years active: 1996–2000
- Labels: Pendulum Records; Red Ant Entertainment
- Past members: Kia Thornton; Nikki Bratcher; Tonia Tash

Divine was an American R&B girl group formed in 1995 who are best known for their 1998 hit single "Lately".

The group consisted of Kia Thornton, Nikki Bratcher and Tonia Tash. Thornton, Bratcher, and Tash were from different cities (all in New York or New Jersey) and were brought together to form a group by managers Nathan Garvin and Gillian Manigat. At the time they had their first and biggest hit with "Lately", Bratcher and Dash were 18 years old and Thornton was 17 years old.

Divine recorded a cover version of the George Michael song "One More Try". The group disbanded in 2000.

== Discography ==
=== Albums ===
- 1998: Fairy Tales (Pendulum Records/Red Ant) -- US #126

=== Singles ===
Year	Song	U.S. Hot 100	U.S. R&B	AUS	UK	Certication	Album
1998	"Lately"	1	2	50	52	RIAA: Platinum	Fairy Tales
1999	"One More Try"	29	13	–	–		Fairy Tales
