= Buat Selamanya =

Single by Hill

from the album Filling in the Pages
- Released: March 2010
- Recorded: January 2010
- Genre: Pop, acoustic
- Length: 3:36
- Label: Sensible Records
- Songwriters: Amalina Abdullah, Bahri Hj. Ibrahim
- Producer: Muhammad Shahrin Hj. Matusin

Hill singles chronology
"Stay in the Middle" (2009)	"Buat Selamanya" (2010)	"I Heard" (2010)

"Buat Selamanya" is a Malay pop ballad by Hill. It is written by Amalina Abdullah and Bahri Hj. Ibrahim. The song was released exclusively in Brunei in March 2010. It was a Top 20 hit on Brunei's Kristal FM chart and reached number 1 on the Pelangi FM chart.

Hill's first performance of this song was at the music video premiere for his debut single "Stay in the Middle" in Brunei on 20 February 2010.

== Background and theme ==
'Buat selamanya' is 'forever' when translated into English. The song is about a love that lasts for all time.

The song is made up of only Hill's vocals and an acoustic guitar.

== Music video ==
The music video, directed by Daryl Prince, is a simple black and white video with Hill singing into a microphone.

== Charts ==
Chart	Peak Position
Brunei Pelangi FM	1
Brunei Kristal FM	18
