= Fairy Tales (Divine album) =

1998 studio album by Divine

Studio album by Divine
- Released: October 27, 1998
- Genre: R&B
- Length: 50:53
- Label: Red Ant; Pendulum
- Producer: Ruben Rodriguez

Singles from Fairy Tales
- 1. "Lately" Released: August 10, 1998; 2. "One More Try" Released: 1999

Fairy Tales is the only studio album by American contemporary R&B group Divine, released October 27, 1998 via Red Ant Records and Pendulum Records. The album peaked at #126 on the Billboard 200.

Two singles were released from Fairy Tales: "Lately" and a cover of George Michael's song "One More Try". "Lately" was the most successful single from the album, peaking at #1 on the Billboard Hot 100 in 1998.

== Track listing ==
Fairy Tales track listing
No.	Title	Writer(s)	Producer(s)	Length
1.	"I Never Thought"	Kevin Perez; Tony Perez; Mark South	South	3:56
2.	"Good 'N Plenty"	Alan Molezion; Joelyn Belle	Robert Palmer	3:49
3.	"One More Try" (George Michael cover)	Michael	Denzil Foster; Thomas McElroy	5:03
4.	"Lately"	Chris Kelly; Will Baker	Donald Parks; John Howcott	4:43
5.	"It's About Time"	Shawn McKenzie; Carlos McKinney; South	McKenzie; McKinney	4:22
6.	"All You Need"	Foster; McElroy; Kia Thornton	Foster; McElroy	4:18
7.	"Fairy Tales"	K. Perez; T. Perez; South	South	3:30
8.	"Missing U"	K. Perez; T. Perez; Randy Ryan; South	K. Perez; T. Perez; South	4:01
9.	"My Love"	Thornton	King Richard	4:10
10.	"Tell Me"	K. Perez; T. Perez; South; Thornton	South	4:19
11.	"I Wish"	Ryan	South; Ryan	4:43
12.	"Sweet Essence (Your Love Is Something)"	India Simpson	Simpson; South; Rodriguez	3:59
Total length:				50:53

== Charts ==
Chart performance for Fairy Tales
Chart (1998)	Peak position
US Billboard 200	126
US Heatseekers Albums (Billboard)	1
US Top R&B/Hip-Hop Albums (Billboard)	40
