= Gotta Tell You =

Studio album by Samantha Mumba
- Released: 31 October 2000
- Genre: R&B; dance-pop
- Length: 42:44
- Label: Polydor; Interscope; A&M; Wildcard
- Producer: Dave Pensado; Teddy Riley; Alar Suurna; Roy "Royalty" Hamilton; Stargate; Steve Mac; Will.i.am

Samantha Mumba chronology
Gotta Tell You (2000)	Samantha Sings Christmas (2001)

Alternative cover
- United States editions and UK/Japanese re-issues

Singles from Gotta Tell You
- 1. "Gotta Tell You" Released: 2 June 2000; 2. "Body II Body" Released: 16 October 2000; 3. "Always Come Back to Your Love" Released: 19 February 2001; 4. "Baby, Come Over (This Is Our Night)" Released: 20 February 2001; 5. "Don't Need You To (Tell Me I'm Pretty)" Released: 4 September 2001; 6. "Lately" Released: 10 December 2001

Gotta Tell You is the only studio album by Irish singer Samantha Mumba. It was released on 31 October 2000 by Polydor Records, Interscope Records, Wildcard Records and A&M Records.

== Album covers ==
The original album cover featured a darkly lit close-up shot of Mumba's face. A&M Records president Ron Fair made the decision to release the album in the United States with a new cover which had Mumba positioned in front of a bright colourful portrait, as he wanted it to be easily identifiable and express Mumba's true personality. The re-issued version removed two songs and included two re-recordings; "Baby, Come Over (This Is Our Night)" and "The Boy", which featured Will.i.am from The Black Eyed Peas, and a new song, "Don't Need You To (Tell Me I'm Pretty)". It was released in the US on 27 March 2001.

== Critical reception ==
Professional ratings
Review scores
Source	Rating
AllMusic	3/5 stars
Christgau's Consumer Guide	(dud)
Entertainment Weekly	C+
Yahoo! Music UK	2/10

Writing for AllMusic, Stephen Thomas Erlewine praised Mumba's vocals for sounding "richer" than other teen pop artists, stating that Gotta Tell You is soulful and well-constructed. However, he also said that the album contained several unmemorable songs. Laura Morgan of Entertainment Weekly considered Mumba to be the Irish equivalent of Christina Aguilera and Britney Spears. Although she criticised the album's reliance on production over her personality, Morgan praised her seductive voice in songs such as "Lately" and "Body II Body". For his "Consumer Guide" reviews, Robert Christgau gave the album a dud rating.

== Track listing ==
Gotta Tell You – Standard version
No.	Title	Writer(s)	Producer(s)	Length
1.	"Gotta Tell You"	Samantha Mumba; Arnthor Birgisson; Anders Bagge	BAG & Arnthor	3:20
2.	"Body II Body"	David Bowie; Lukas Burton	Burton; Sacha Skarbek^{[a]}	3:57
3.	"Baby Come On Over"	Mumba; Birgisson; Bagge	BAG & Arnthor	3:03
4.	"Isn't It Strange"	Mumba; Birgisson; Bagge	BAG & Arnthor	3:29
5.	"Lately"	Edward Woodruff; Willie Baker	Steve Mac	5:06
6.	"What's It Gonna Be"	Mumba; Birgisson; Bagge	BAG & Arnthor	2:58
7.	"Always Come Back to Your Love"	Hallgeir Rustan; Mikkel Storleer Eriksen; Tor Erik Hermansen	Stargate	3:34
8.	"Lose You Again"	Rustan; Eriksen; Hermansen	Stargate	4:09
9.	"Feelin Is Right"	Anders Barrén; Jany Schella	Barrén; Schella	3:49
10.	"Never Meant to Be"	Rustan; Eriksen; Hermansen	Stargate	4:09
11.	"Believe in Me"	Mumba; Birgisson; Bagge	BAG & Arnthor	3:31
12.	"Til the Night Becomes the Day"	Mumba; Lars Halvor Jensen; Martin Michael Larsson	Jensen; Larsson	3:43

Japan bonus track
No.	Title	Writer(s)	Producer(s)	Length
13.	"Where Does It End Now?"	Nicholas Morris; Bill Padley; Jem Godfrey	Padley; Godfrey	3:40

Gotta Tell You – US version
No.	Title	Writer(s)	Producer(s)	Length
1.	"Gotta Tell You"	Mumba; Birgisson; Bagge	BAG & Arnthor	3:20
2.	"Body II Body"	Bowie; Burton	Burton; Skarbek^{[a]}	3:57
3.	"Baby Come On Over"	Mumba; Birgisson; Bagge	BAG & Arnthor	3:03
4.	"Isn't It Strange"	Mumba; Birgisson; Bagge	BAG & Arnthor	3:29
5.	"Lately"	Woodruff; Baker	Mac	5:06
6.	"What's It Gonna Be"	Mumba; Birgisson; Bagge	BAG & Arnthor	2:58
7.	"Always Come Back to Your Love"	Rustan; Eriksen; Hermansen	Stargate	3:34
8.	"The Boy"	Curtis Mayfield; Ernest Dixon; Roy Hamilton; Teddy Riley	Hamilton; Riley	3:27
9.	"Feelin Is Right"	Barrén; Schella	Barrén; Schella	3:49
10.	"Never Meant to Be"	Rustan; Eriksen; Hermansen	Stargate	4:09
11.	"Believe in Me"	Mumba; Birgisson; Bagge	BAG & Arnthor	3:31
12.	"Til the Night Becomes the Day"	Mumba; Jensen; Larsson	Jensen; Larsson	3:43

Gotta Tell You – US reissue
No.	Title	Writer(s)	Producer(s)	Length
1.	"Gotta Tell You"	Mumba; Birgisson; Bagge	BAG & Arnthor	3:20
2.	"Baby, Come Over (This Is Our Night)"	Mumba; Birgisson; Bagge	BAG & Arnthor	3:33
3.	"The Boy" (remix featuring will.i.am)	Mayfield; Dixon; Hamilton; Riley	Hamilton; Riley	4:04
4.	"Don't Need You To (Tell Me I'm Pretty)"	Diane Warren	Eric Dawkins; Ron Fair; Sol Survivor	3:38
5.	"Always Come Back to Your Love"	Rustan; Eriksen; Hermansen	Stargate	3:34
6.	"Feelin Is Right"	Barrén; Schella	Barrén; Schella	3:49
7.	"Body II Body"	Bowie; Burton	Burton; Skarbek^{[a]}	3:57
8.	"What's It Gonna Be"	Mumba; Birgisson; Bagge	BAG & Arnthor	2:58
9.	"Never Meant to Be"	Rustan; Eriksen; Hermansen	Stargate	4:09
10.	"Isn't It Strange"	Mumba; Birgisson; Bagge	BAG & Arnthor	3:29
11.	"Lately"	Woodruff; Baker	Mac	5:06

Gotta Tell You – UK/Japanese re-issue
No.	Title	Writer(s)	Producer(s)	Length
1.	"Gotta Tell You"	Mumba; Birgisson; Bagge	BAG & Arnthor	3:21
2.	"Body II Body"	Bowie; Burton	Burton; Skarbek^{[a]}	4:00
3.	"Baby Come On Over"	Mumba; Birgisson; Bagge	BAG & Arnthor	3:35
4.	"Isn't It Strange"	Mumba; Birgisson; Bagge	BAG & Arnthor	3:29
5.	"Lately"	Woodruff; Baker	Mac	5:09
6.	"What's It Gonna Be"	Mumba; Birgisson; Bagge	BAG & Arnthor	2:58
7.	"Always Come Back to Your Love"	Rustan; Eriksen; Hermansen	Stargate	3:55
8.	"Feelin Is Right"	Anders Barrén; Jany Schella	Barrén; Schella	3:50
9.	"Never Meant to Be"	Rustan; Eriksen; Hermansen	Stargate	4:11
10.	"Til the Night Becomes the Day"	Mumba; Jensen; Larsson	Jensen; Larsson	3:43
11.	"The Boy" (remix featuring Omero Mumba)	Mayfield; Dixon; Hamilton; Riley	Hamilton; Riley	4:14
12.	"I Don't Need You To"	Warren	Dawkins; Fair; Survivor	3:39
13.	"Stand by Your Side"	Rustan; Eriksen; Hermansen	Stargate	3:27
14.	"Gotta Tell You" (Teddy Riley Remix)	Mumba; Birgisson; Bagge	BAG & Arnthor; Riley^{[a]}	3:21
15.	"Signed, Sealed, Delivered"	Lee Garrett; Lula Mae Hardaway; Stevie Wonder; Syreeta Wright	Dan Sanders; Paul Waterman	2:54

Notes

- ^{^[a]} signifies a co-producer
- Some European editions of the reissue have the song "Never Meant to Be" removed.

== Charts ==
=== Weekly charts ===
Chart (2000–2001)	Peak position
Australian Albums (ARIA)	146
Australian Hitseekers Albums (ARIA)	8
European Top 100 Albums (Music & Media)	49
Irish Albums (IRMA)	4
Japanese Albums (Oricon)	31
Scottish Albums (OCC)	19
Swiss Albums (Schweizer Hitparade)	53
UK Albums (OCC)	9
UK R&B Albums (OCC)	9
US Billboard 200	67

=== Year-end charts ===
Chart (2001)	Position
UK Albums (OCC)	91

== Certifications ==
Region	Certification	Certified units/sales
United Kingdom (BPI)	Gold	100,000^{^}
^{^} Shipments figures based on certification alone.

== Release history ==
Release dates and formats for Gotta Tell You
Country	Date	Edition(s)	Format(s)	Label	Ref.
United Kingdom	30 October 2000	Standard	Cassette; CD	Polydor	
United States	31 October 2000	Standard	Cassette; CD	A&M	
Australia	6 November 2000	Standard	CD	Polydor	
Japan	25 January 2001	Standard	CD	Universal Music Japan	
United States	27 March 2001	Reissue	Cassette; CD	A&M	
United Kingdom	17 September 2001	Reissue	Cassette; CD	Polydor	
Japan	19 September 2001	Reissue	CD	Universal Music Japan	
