= Always Come Back to Your Love =

2001 single by Samantha Mumba

Single by Samantha Mumba

from the album Gotta Tell You
- Released: 19 February 2001
- Studio: Stargate (Norway)
- Genre: Pop; soft pop
- Length: 3:55
- Label: Wildcard; Polydor
- Songwriters: Tor Erik Hermansen; Mikkel S.E.; Hallgeir Rustan
- Producer: Stargate

Samantha Mumba singles chronology
"Body II Body" (2000)	"Always Come Back to Your Love" (2001)	"Baby, Come Over (This Is Our Night)" (2001)

Audio video
- "Always Come Back to Your Love" on YouTube

"Always Come Back to Your Love" is a song by Irish singer Samantha Mumba, released as the third single from her debut studio album, Gotta Tell You (2000), on 19 February 2001. The song was written by Hallgeir Rustan and producers Stargate, who recorded it at the producers' Norwegian studio. "Always Come Back to Your Love" was Mumba's second and final song to top the Irish Singles Chart, peaking at number one on the week dated 22 February 2001. It also entered the top 10 in the United Kingdom and Romania, reaching numbers three and 10, respectively.

== Music video ==
The video starts off with Mumba exiting a car that just pulled into a building, and she starts singing. It cuts to a new scene where Mumba is sitting with friends in a blue room while boys walk in; the video switches between this scene and her dancing a routine. These three scenes continue to switch during the rest of the song.

== Track listings ==
UK and Australian CD single

1. "Always Come Back to Your Love" (with rap)
2. "Always Come Back to Your Love" (Cevin Fisher vocal mix)
3. "Always Come Back to Your Love" (DJ Disciple vocal club mix)
4. "Always Come Back to Your Love" (video)

UK cassette single and European CD single

1. "Always Come Back to Your Love" (with rap) – 3:49
2. "Always Come Back to Your Love" (Almighty mix) – 8:48

== Credits and personnel ==
Credits are lifted from the UK and Australian CD single liner notes.

Studio

- Recorded and mixed at Stargate Studios (Norway)

Personnel

- Samantha Mumba – vocals
- Stargate – production, vocal production (as D-Flex)
  - Mikkel S.E. – writing, all instruments
  - Hallgeir Rustan – writing, all instruments
  - Tor Erik Hermansen – writing, all instruments
- Lorenzo Agius – photography

== Charts ==
=== Weekly charts ===
Chart (2001)	Peak position
Australia (ARIA)	63
Europe (Eurochart Hot 100)	11
Ireland (IRMA)	1
New Zealand (Recorded Music NZ)	43
Romania (Romanian Top 100)	10
Scottish Singles Sales (Official Charts)	3
UK Singles (Official Charts)	3

=== Year-end charts ===
Chart (2001)	Position
Ireland (IRMA)	21
Romania (Romanian Top 100)	63
UK Singles (OCC)	39

== Certifications ==
Region	Certification	Certified units/sales
United Kingdom (BPI)	Gold	400,000^{‡}
^{‡} Sales+streaming figures based on certification alone.

== Release history ==
Region	Date	Format(s)	Label(s)	Ref(s).
United Kingdom	19 February 2001	CD; cassette	Polydor; Wildcard	
Australia	9 April 2001	CD	Polydor; Wildcard	
