= Hill Zaini =

- Born: Hilmi Zaini; 13 October 1987 (age 38); Brunei
- Origin: Brunei
- Genre: Pop
- Occupations: Singer, songwriter, actor
- Instrument: Vocals
- Years active: since 2008
- Label: Sensible Records
- Website: hillzaini.com

Hill Zaini (born 13 October 1987), popularly known as Hill, is a Bruneian singer and actor.

== Early life ==
Hill was born on 13 October 1987, in Brunei. Singing has been his passion since a very young age. He performed regularly in school and on talent shows.

== P2F ==
P2F is a television show in Brunei which has a similar concept to the Idol series. Hill was a contestant on the show in 2008 and was put through to the 'Final 12'. One of his most prominent performances was a duet of the Malay song "Lagu Jiwa Lagu Cinta". After 3 weeks in the 'Final 12', there was controversy as Hill had to withdraw from the show for personal reasons.

== Acting career ==
After P2F, Hill was given the lead role in the RTB (Radio Television Brunei) TV series Aku Bukan Milikmu (I'm Not Yours) which was aired in May 2009. This was Hill's first venture into acting and was a hit in Brunei. This was followed by starring roles on other RTB dramas Usaha, Rindu Lagi and Korban Kasih which were aired in the latter part of 2009.

== Music career ==
After being spotted by a talent scout, Hill headed to London, England and signed with Sensible Records. His first single, "Stay in the Middle", a duet with Irish platinum-selling artist Samantha Mumba, was released to iTunes in August 2009, with an album scheduled for release in 2010. Hill would be the first Bruneian to have a record contract with an international label and to have released a song with an international pop star.

The music video for "Stay in the Middle" features a cameo appearance by US recording artist Mariah Carey. The superstar was so impressed with Hill's performance at an event in London that she agreed to appear in the video. It was a recipient of a 2010 AVIMA (Asia Pacific Voice Independent Music Award) for Most Mindblowing Music Video where it came in third place.

He was Brunei Pelangi FM's 'Spotlight Artist' in September 2009 and 'Artist of the Month' in May 2010.

In March 2010, Hill released a single exclusively for his Bruneian fanbase entitled "Buat Selamanya". The song entered straight into the Brunei Kristal FM Top 20 and reached number 1 on Pelangi FM.

In July 2010, his third single, "I Heard", was released to iTunes as well as radio stations in Brunei. It reached number 1 on Brunei's Pelangi FM chart in September 2010. The single's music video stars Kristin Kreuk and Faye Dunaway.

== Charity performances ==
Hill performed at the Sounds of Hope Charity Gala Night on 3 October 2009. The concert aimed to raise awareness about poverty in Brunei. Hill said of his involvement with the charity: "I am a sensitive person, so it is actually saddening to learn that these poverty-stricken families are most of the time mistreated or looked down upon. Help the poor, like how you would want to be helped if you were in their position." The concert was one of the most successful and extravagant shows in Brunei in 2009.

On 13 March 2010, he performed at The Noble Gift Gala in London, which was hosted by Eva Longoria. The event raised money for Make-A-Wish Foundation UK, which grants wishes to terminally ill children, and Eva's Heroes, an organization founded by Eva Longoria which aims to enrich the lives of children with special needs.

== Awards and nominations ==
| Year | Award | Category | Position |
|---|---|---|---|
| 2010 | AVIMA (Asia Pacific Voice Independent Music Award) | Most Mindblowing Music Video ("Stay in the Middle" – featuring Samantha Mumba) | Won (third place) |
| 2010 | Cool-Tones Awards | Best Male | Won |

== Discography ==
Singles

| Year | Single | Brunei Pelangi FM Chart Position | Album |
|---|---|---|---|
| 2009 | "Stay in the Middle" (featuring Samantha Mumba): Released : August 2009 | 5 | Filling in The Pages |
| 2010 | "Buat Selamanya": Released : March 2010 | 1 | Filling in The Pages |
| 2010 | "I Heard": Released : June 2010 | 1 | Filling in The Pages |

Music videos

| Year | Title | Director |
|---|---|---|
| 2009 | "Stay in the Middle" (featuring Samantha Mumba) | Omero Mumba |
| 2010 | "Buat Selamanya" | Daryl Prince |
| 2010 | "I Heard" | Caswell Coggins |
