= Omero Mumba =

Writer, filmmaker, Irish actor and writer and director

- Born: Omero Mumba; 2 July 1989 (age 37); Dublin, Ireland
- Years active: 2001–2024
- Relatives: Samantha Mumba (sister)

Omero Mumba (/ˈoʊməroʊ/; born 2 July 1989) is a filmmaker and photographer.

== Life and career ==
Mumba was born in Dublin, Ireland, to Peter Mumba, a Zambian aircraft engineer and Barbara, who is Irish; his sister, Samantha Mumba, is an actress and singer.

After appearing in a 1995 episode of the television series, The Governor, Mumba was cast opposite his sister, Samantha, in the 2002 film version of H. G. Wells' The Time Machine. The film was a co-production of DreamWorks and Warner Bros. He played Kalen.

In 2010, Mumba wrote and directed the music video 'Stay in the Middle' for Bruneian singer Hill Zaini, which was produced by Generator Entertainment and Sensible Music Group. The video includes a cameo appearance by Mariah Carey. It was filmed in Notting Hill, London, shot on Super 16mm. Ed Wild served as the cinematographer. The video was the recipient of a 2010 AVIMA (Asia Pacific Voice Independent Music Award) for "Most Mind-Blowing Music Video" where it came in third place.

His girlfriend is Dublin-based recording artist Annie-Dog. Mumba directed the video for her debut single, 'The Pressures of the Heart', released February 28, 2024 via UK label Dance to the Radio.

== Singles ==
- Lil' Big Man (2002, UK #42)
