= Alexandre Horowitz =

Dutch engineer and inventor (1904–1982)

Sacha Horowitz
- Born: Alexandre Horowitz; 24 March 1904; Antwerp
- Died: 1982 (aged 77–78); Switzerland
- Employer(s): Philips, Eindhoven University of Technology
- Known for: Rotary electric razor and many other inventions
- Honours: Honorary Member of the American Society of Mechanical Engineers

Alexandre "Sacha" Horowitz (24 March 1904 – 1982) was a Belgian-born Dutch mechanical engineer and inventor.

Alexandre "Sacha" Horowitz was born in 1904 in Antwerp, (Belgium) to parents of East-European Jewish heritage, and lived from 1914 in The Netherlands until his death in 1982. He has 136 patents awarded to his name over a period of 50 years, covering a wide variety of products including prefab housing, farm machinery (e.g. Vicon, see below) and oil industry equipment. His most well-known invention, however, is the Philishave rotary electric razor, one of the first rotary electric razors.

From 1958 to 1974, he was the first professor of product design and Production engineering at the Eindhoven University of Technology. In 1980, Horowitz was elected Honorary Member of the American Society of Mechanical Engineers. He died in 1982 in Switzerland.
