= Philishave =

Brand name

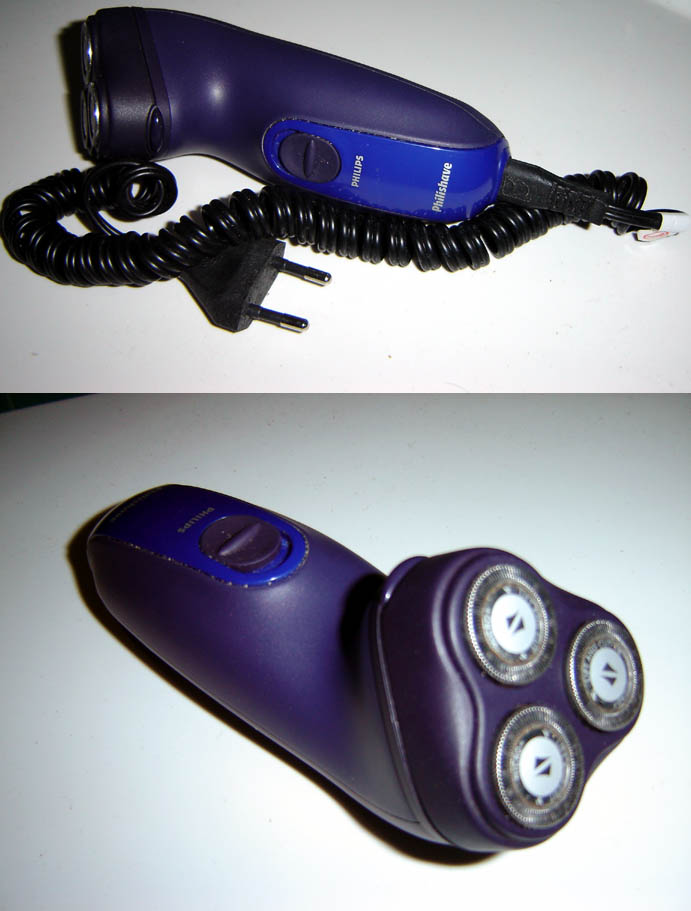
Philishave model HQ-5426

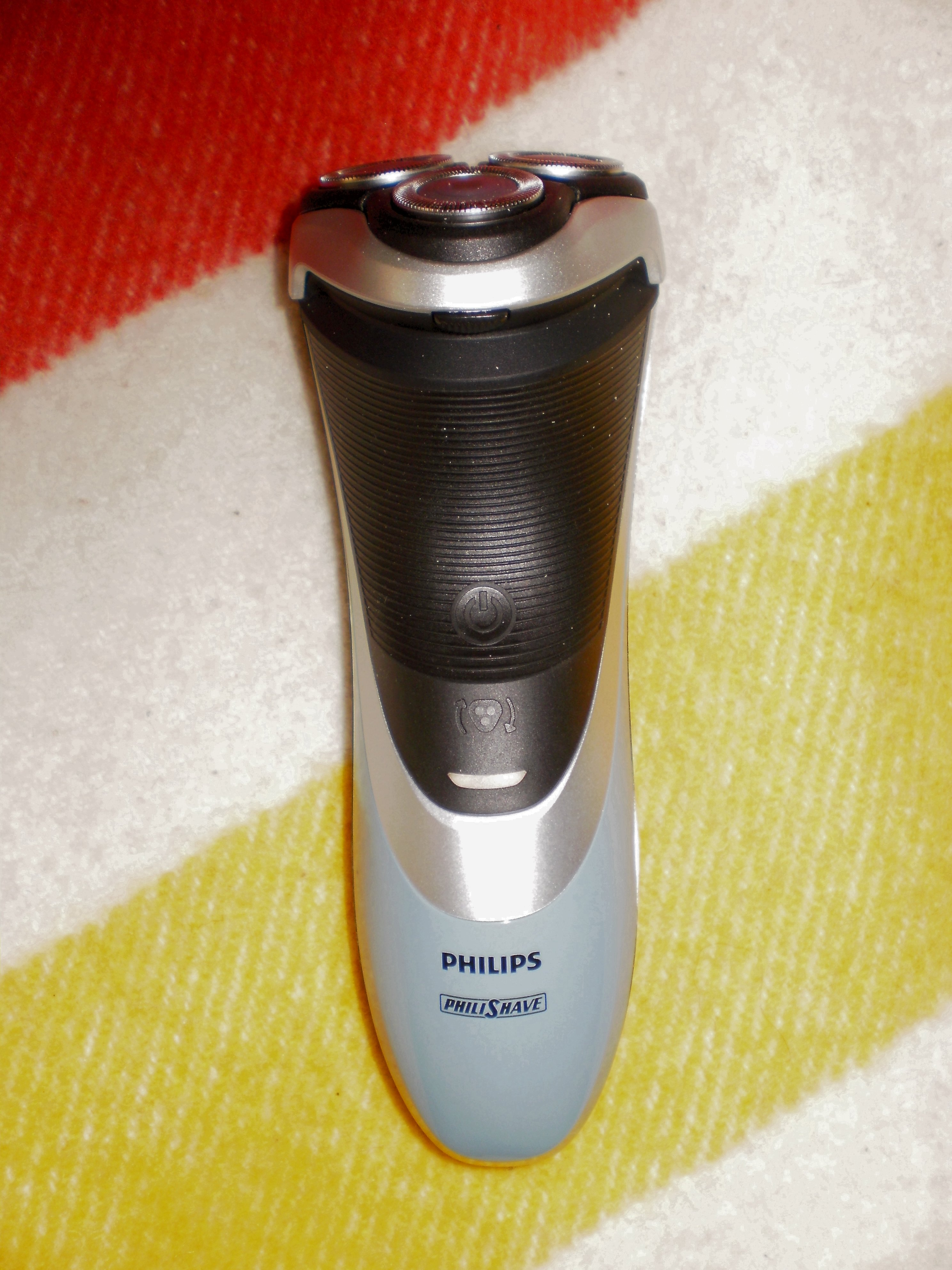
"Heritage" Philishave model S3552 celebrating 80th anniversary of Philishave brand

Philishave was a brand name for electric shavers manufactured by Dutch electronics conglomerate Philips, under its Personal Health division. In recent years, Philips had extended the Philishave brand to include hair clippers, beard trimmers and beard shapers. Philips used the Philishave brand name for their shavers from 1939 to 2006, before phasing it out in favour of the Philips brand. In the United States, Philips shavers were sold under the Norelco brand, before being co-branded as Philips-Norelco.

Philips currently has two production centres for shavers: Drachten, in the Netherlands, and Zhuhai, in China.

== History ==
The Philishave shaver was invented by Philips engineer Alexandre Horowitz, who used rotating cutters instead of the reciprocating cutters that had been used in previous electric shavers.

The shaver was introduced in 1939, though initial production was limited due to the outbreak of World War II (the production facility in Eindhoven, the Netherlands, was overrun by the German Army in 1940). After the war, a slightly improved version of the cigar-shaped single-head shaver was introduced. A more ergonomic egg-shaped single-head model was introduced in 1948 and was designed by US industrial designer Raymond Loewy. Global sales increased markedly after a double-head model was introduced in 1951. In 1952, production of shavers shifted from Eindhoven to a new production facility in Drachten, the Netherlands. A triple-head model was test marketed in Australia and New Zealand in 1956, but would not be introduced globally until 1966. In 1980, Philips introduced the Lift & Cut Philishave shaver, invented by Eduard W. Tietjens, with lifters which pull whiskers slightly before cutting, allowing for closer shaves.

The brand name Philishave was phased out in 2006 so shavers now bear only the Philips name. Philips is now co-branding their shavers sold in the US as "Philips Norelco" in preparation of a phase-out of the Norelco name.

Philips have celebrated their 80th anniversary in the electric shaver business by marketing special 'Heritage Edition' shaver models reviving the Philishave brand.

== Models and parts ==
According to instructions supplied with the units, the shaving heads need cleaning every 2 months and replacing every 18 months. However, not all Philips spare parts will fit well on all Philips shavers.

Heads are given an "HQ" number, such as HQ2, HQ3, HQ4, HQ5, etc., and this number should normally correspond with the first digit of the model number of the shaver. An exception is the 6000 series which takes HQ8 heads.

Although the heads do look much the same, attempts to fit the wrong HQ number may fail; for example, an HQ5 head will not correctly engage with the spindle on a shaver model designed for an HQ3 or HQ4 head, due to a small extra piece of plastic in the centre of the HQ5 drive socket. Care should therefore be taken when choosing replacement parts.

== See also ==
- Philips Consumer Lifestyle
