= Gotta Tell You (song) =

2000 single by Samantha Mumba

Single by Samantha Mumba

from the album Gotta Tell You
- B-side: "Where Does It End Now?"; "Can It Be Love"
- Released: 2 June 2000
- Length: 3:22
- Label: Polydor; Wildcard
- Songwriters: Anders Bagge; Arnthor Birgisson; Samantha Mumba
- Producers: Bag & Arnthor

Samantha Mumba singles chronology
"Gotta Tell You" (2000)	"Body II Body" (2000)

Audio video
- "Gotta Tell You" on YouTube

"Gotta Tell You" is a song by Irish singer Samantha Mumba and the title track from her first studio album. The song was written and produced by the Swedish team Bag & Arnthor (Anders Bagge and Arnthor Birgisson), with Mumba co-writing. "Gotta Tell You" was released on 2 June 2000 as Mumba's debut single and became an international hit, peaking at number one in Ireland and New Zealand, number two in the United Kingdom, and number three in Australia. In the United States, it reached number four on the Billboard Hot 100, spending 22 weeks on that chart. In 2001, the song won a Meteor Music Award for Best Selling Irish Single – Female Artist.

== Composition ==
Having a moderate tempo with 110 beats per minute, the song "Gotta Tell You" is written in the key of C minor and follows the chord progression of A♭–B♭–Cm in the verses and A♭_{7}–B♭–Cm–C–B♭–G in the song's chorus, with the C major chord being a picardy third (or a borrowed chord), as it is a parallel key. Samantha Mumba's vocals span from E♭_{3} to B♭_{4}.

== Music video ==
The music video shows Mumba walking, running and dancing around a city and running to catch a plane. It also includes Mumba doing minor stunts which include flipping off a building onto the street and jumping onto and off a moving firetruck. The video was shot in the city of Fuengirola, Málaga, Spain. In the United States, the video for "Gotta Tell You" first premiered on BET the week ending on 17 July 2000. It later made its premiere on MTV weeks later on the week ending on 31 July 2000.

== Track listings ==
UK and Australian CD single

1. "Gotta Tell You" – 3:20
2. "Can It Be Love?" – 3:16
3. "Where Does It End Now?" – 3:40
4. "Gotta Tell You" (CD-ROM video) – 3:20

European CD single

1. "Gotta Tell You" – 3:20
2. "Gotta Tell You" (Sleaze Sisters mix edit) – 3:59

Australian limited-edition CD single and Japanese CD single

1. "Gotta Tell You" – 3:20
2. "Gotta Tell You" (Teddy Riley remix) – 3:47
3. "Gotta Tell You" (Basstoy mix) – 9:10

US CD single

1. "Gotta Tell You" – 3:20
2. "Gotta Tell You" (Mindchime dub) – 5:07

== Credits and personnel ==
Credits are lifted from the UK CD single liner notes.

Studios

- Mixed at Shortlist Analogue (Stockholm, Sweden)
- Mastered at 777 Productions (London, England)

Personnel

- Bag & Arnthor – production, arrangement
  - Anders Bagge – writing
  - Arnthor Birgisson – writing, background vocals
- Samantha Mumba – writing
- Anders von Hofsten – background vocals
- Jeanette Olsson – background vocals
- Mats Berntoft – guitar
- Stockholm Session Strings – strings
- Jansson & Jansson – string arrangement
- Alar Suurna – mixing
- Arun Chakraverty – mastering
- Rankin – photography

== Charts ==
=== Weekly charts ===
Chart (2000–2001)	Peak position
Australia (ARIA)	3
Australian Dance (ARIA)	2
Australian Urban (ARIA)	1
Austria (Ö3 Austria Top 40)	38
Belgium (Ultratop 50 Flanders)	15
Belgium (Ultratop 50 Wallonia)	15
Canada (Nielsen SoundScan)	11
Canada CHR (Nielsen BDS)	6
Denmark (IFPI)	8
Europe (Eurochart Hot 100)	9
France (SNEP)	9
Germany (GfK)	28
Ireland (IRMA)	1
Italy (FIMI)	36
Netherlands (Dutch Top 40)	7
Netherlands (Single Top 100)	8
New Zealand (Recorded Music NZ)	1
Norway (VG-lista)	19
Poland (Polish Airplay Chart)	30
Scottish Singles Sales (Official Charts)	5
Spain (Promusicae)	6
Sweden (Sverigetopplistan)	14
Switzerland (Schweizer Hitparade)	17
UK Singles (Official Charts)	2
US Billboard Hot 100	4
US Dance Club Play (Billboard)	2
US Hot R&B Singles (Billboard)	49
US Mainstream Top 40 (Billboard)	5
US Rhythmic Top 40 (Billboard)	21

=== Year-end charts ===
Chart (2000)	Position
Australia (ARIA)	32
France (SNEP)	69
Ireland (IRMA)	2
Netherlands (Dutch Top 40)	51
Netherlands (Single Top 100)	49
Sweden (Hitlistan)	85
UK Singles (OCC)	50
US Billboard Hot 100	98
US Mainstream Top 40 (Billboard)	57

Chart (2001)	Position
Europe (Eurochart Hot 100)	98
France (SNEP)	89
Switzerland (Schweizer Hitparade)	95
US Mainstream Top 40 (Billboard)	44

== Certifications ==
Region	Certification	Certified units/sales
Australia (ARIA)	Platinum	70,000^{^}
France (SNEP)	Gold	250,000^{*}
United Kingdom (BPI)	Gold	400,000^{‡}
^{*} Sales figures based on certification alone.^{^} Shipments figures based on certification alone.^{‡} Sales+streaming figures based on certification alone.

== Release history ==
Region	Date	Format(s)	Label(s)	Ref.
Ireland	2 June 2000	—N/a	Polydor; Wildcard	
United Kingdom	26 June 2000	CD; cassette	Polydor; Wildcard	
United States	25 July 2000	Rhythmic contemporary; contemporary hit radio	Interscope	
United States	8 August 2000	CD; cassette	Interscope	
Japan	19 January 2001	CD	Universal Music Japan	

== Micky Modelle vs. Samantha Mumba version ==
"Gotta Tell You"

Single by Micky Modelle vs. Samantha Mumba
- Released: 2008
- Genre: Eurodance
- Length: 3:13
- Label: AATW
- Songwriters: Anders Bagge; Arnthor Birgisson
- Producer: Micky Modelle

Irish DJ Micky Modelle remixed the song and released it as a single in 2008 through All Around the World Productions. After Mumba heard the remix, she liked the song and re-recorded some of the vocals. She promoted the song on the Clubland Live Tour in 2008.

=== Music video ===
A video for the song was filmed throughout London and Belfast in May 2008 and was premiered on 13 June 2008. The video features Modelle and Mumba in a conference room with various clones of Mumba as various maps of cities in the UK moving around her, with the maps indicating that "club energy levels are low".

Mumba and the clones of herself go out to the cities clubs where the people in the club start dancing and the club energy levels are restored.
