= I Heard (song) =

Single by Hill

from the album Filling in the Pages
- Released: July 5, 2010
- Recorded: March 2010
- Genre: Pop
- Length: 3:53
- Label: Sensible Records
- Songwriter(s): Deni Lew, Jamie Dornan, Pete Glenister, David Alexander
- Producer(s): Deni Lew, Pete Glenister

Hill singles chronology
"Buat Selamanya" (2010)	"I Heard" (2010)

"I Heard" is a pop ballad by Hill. It is written by Deni Lew, Jamie Dornan, Pete Glenister and David Alexander for Hill's debut album Filling in the Pages. The song was released to iTunes on July 5, 2010. It reached number 1 on Brunei's Pelangi FM chart in September 2010.

== Background and theme ==
"I Heard" is about how life gets more complicated as one grows older. The song is written in the form of questions that remain unanswered and seem less simple as time goes by.

The song was released under Sensible Records.

== Music video ==
The single's music video, directed by Caswell Coggins, was shot in London in July 2010. It stars Hill, Kristin Kreuk, Faye Dunaway and Paulo Rivera. The video, a tale of unrequited love, sees Hill as a stuntman for a notoriously difficult leading actor, played by Rivera. He falls in love with the leading lady, played by Kreuk, but does not know how to tell her. At the end of the video, he takes his chance and ends up clicking with her. Dunaway plays the director.

== Charts ==
Chart	Peak Position
Brunei Pelangi FM	1
