= Billboard Year-End Hot R&B Singles of 1997 =

American music chart

This is a list of Billboard magazine's Top Hot R&B Singles of 1997.

No.	Title	Artist(s)
1	"In My Bed"	Dru Hill
2	"I'll Be Missing You"	Puff Daddy and Faith Evans featuring 112
3	"G.H.E.T.T.O.U.T."	Changing Faces
4	"Can't Nobody Hold Me Down"	Puff Daddy featuring Mase
5	"You Make Me Wanna..."	Usher
6	"I Belong to You (Every Time I See Your Face)"	Rome
7	"I Believe I Can Fly"	R. Kelly
8	"Cupid"	112
9	"On & On"	Erykah Badu
10	"Get It Together"	702
11	"Never Make a Promise"	Dru Hill
12	"Don't Let Go (Love)"	En Vogue
13	"Return of the Mack"	Mark Morrison
14	"For You I Will"	Monica
15	"For You"	Kenny Lattimore
16	"Big Daddy"	Heavy D
17	"My Love Is the Shhh!"	Somethin' for the People featuring Trina & Tamara
18	"Un-Break My Heart"	Toni Braxton
19	"Nobody"	Keith Sweat featuring Athena Cage
20	"Mo Money Mo Problems"	The Notorious B.I.G. featuring Puff Daddy and Mase
21	"What Kind of Man Would I Be?"	Mint Condition
22	"What's on Tonight"	Montell Jordan
23	"Not Tonight"	Lil' Kim featuring Da Brat, Left Eye, Missy Elliott and Angie Martinez
24	"Hypnotize"	The Notorious B.I.G.
25	"4 Seasons of Loneliness"	Boyz II Men
26	"Every Time I Close My Eyes"	Babyface
27	"What About Us"	Total
28	"Up Jumps da Boogie"	Timbaland & Magoo
29	"I Believe in You and Me" / "Somebody Bigger than You and I"	Whitney Houston
30	"Pony"	Ginuwine
31	"I Can Love You" / "Love Is All We Need"	Mary J. Blige
32	"I'll Be"	Foxy Brown featuring Jay-Z
33	"I Don't Want To" / "I Love Me Some Him"	Toni Braxton
34	"Cold Rock a Party"	MC Lyte featuring Missy Elliott
35	"You Should Be Mine (Don't Waste Your Time)"	Brian McKnight featuring Mase
36	"No Time"	Lil' Kim featuring Puff Daddy
37	"Honey"	Mariah Carey
38	"Don't Wanna Be a Player"	Joe
39	"I'm Still in Love with You" / "You Don't Have to Worry"	New Edition
40	"Thinking of You" / "Let's Get Down"	Tony! Toni! Toné!
41	"Butta Love"	Next
42	"Da' Dip"	Freak Nasty
43	"No Diggity"	Blackstreet featuring Dr. Dre and Queen Pen
44	"5 Miles to Empty"	Brownstone
45	"Someone"	SWV
46	"Everything"	Mary J. Blige
47	"You Bring Me Up"	K-Ci & JoJo
48	"My Baby Daddy"	B-Rock and the Bizz
49	"Smile"	Scarface featuring 2Pac and Johnny P.
50	"All Cried Out"	Allure featuring 112
51	"You Don't Have to Hurt No More"	Mint Condition
52	"Tears"	The Isley Brothers
53	"I Care 'Bout You"	Milestone
54	"Look into My Eyes"	Bone Thugs-n-Harmony
55	"I Can Make It Better"	Luther Vandross
56	"Last Night"	Az Yet
57	"Knocks Me Off My Feet" / "You Should Know"	Donell Jones
58	"My Body"	LSG
59	"Do You Like This"	Rome
60	"Hard to Say I'm Sorry"	Az Yet featuring Peter Cetera
61	"This Is for the Lover in You"	Babyface featuring LL Cool J, Howard Hewett, Jody Watley, and Jeffrey Daniel
62	"Gotham City"	Bone Thugs-n-Harmony
63	"Tell Me"	Dru Hill
64	"Let Me Clear My Throat"	DJ Kool
65	"Big Bad Mama"	Foxy Brown featuring Dru Hill
66	"I'm Not Feeling You"	Yvette Michele
67	"Steelo"	702 featuring Missy Elliott
68	"When You Talk About Love"	Patti LaBelle
69	"Full of Smoke"	Christión
70	"The Theme (It's Party Time)"	Tracey Lee
71	"Request Line"	Zhané
72	"Let It Go"	Ray J
73	"The One I Gave My Heart To"	Aaliyah
74	"Sock It 2 Me" / "The Rain (Supa Dupa Fly)"	Missy Elliott featuring Da Brat
75	"Come See Me"	112
76	"Falling"	Montell Jordan
77	"It's Your Body"	Johnny Gill
78	"Take It to the Streets"	Rampage featuring Billy Lawrence
79	"We Trying to Stay Alive"	Wyclef Jean featuring John Forté and Pras
80	"Head over Heels"	Allure featuring Nas
81	"Ghetto Love"	Da Brat featuring T-Boz
82	"I Miss My Homies"	Master P featuring Silkk the Shocker and Pimp C
83	"I Shot the Sheriff"	Warren G
84	"What's Stopping You"	The O'Jays
85	"Luchini AKA This Is It"	Camp Lo
86	"Feel So Good"	Mase
87	"Whatever"	En Vogue
88	"Missing You"	Brandy, Tamia, Gladys Knight and Chaka Khan
89	"After 12, Before 6"	Sam Salter
90	"Street Dreams"	Nas
91	"Things Just Ain't the Same"	Deborah Cox
92	"Nothin' But the Cavi Hit"	Mack 10 and Tha Dogg Pound
93	"Come On"	Billy Lawrence featuring MC Lyte
94	"Step into a World (Rapture's Delight)"	KRS-One
95	"Whateva Man"	Redman
96	"Sumthin' Sumthin'"	Maxwell
97	"They Like It Slow"	H-Town
98	"Last Night's Letter"	K-Ci & JoJo
99	"Backyard Boogie"	Mack 10
100	"Watch Me Do My Thing"	Immature featuring Smooth and Kel Mitchell (as Ed from Good Burger)

== See also ==
- 1997 in music
- Billboard Year-End Hot 100 singles of 1997
- Billboard Year-End Hot Rap Singles of 1997
- List of number-one R&B singles of 1997 (U.S.)
