= Billboard Year-End Hot 100 singles of 1997 =

Ranking of recorded music

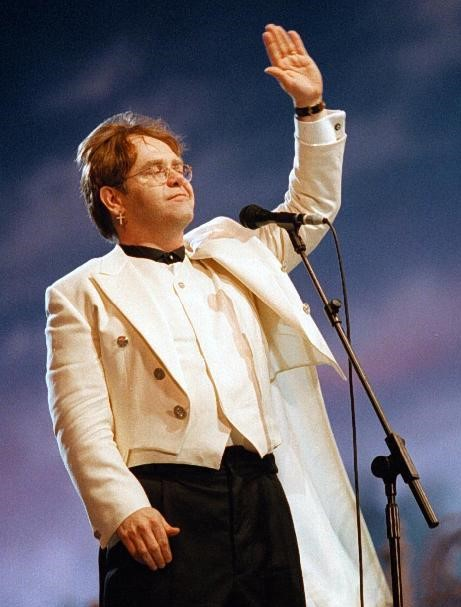
Elton John (pictured) topped the Year-End chart with his double-sided single, "Candle in the Wind 1997" / "Something About the Way You Look Tonight", which was at the top of the Hot 100 for 14 weeks.

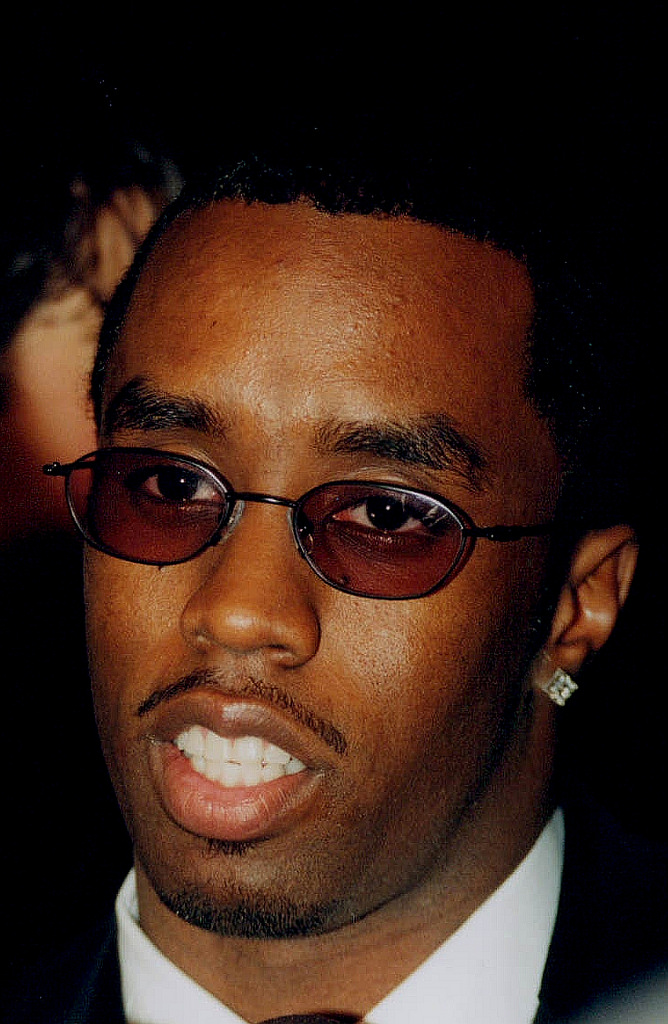
Puff Daddy (pictured) had the most songs on the Year-End list with five: two of them, "I'll Be Missing You" and "Can't Nobody Hold Me Down", appeared in the top 10, and he was featured on three other songs on the chart ("Mo Money Mo Problems", "No Time", and "Someone".)

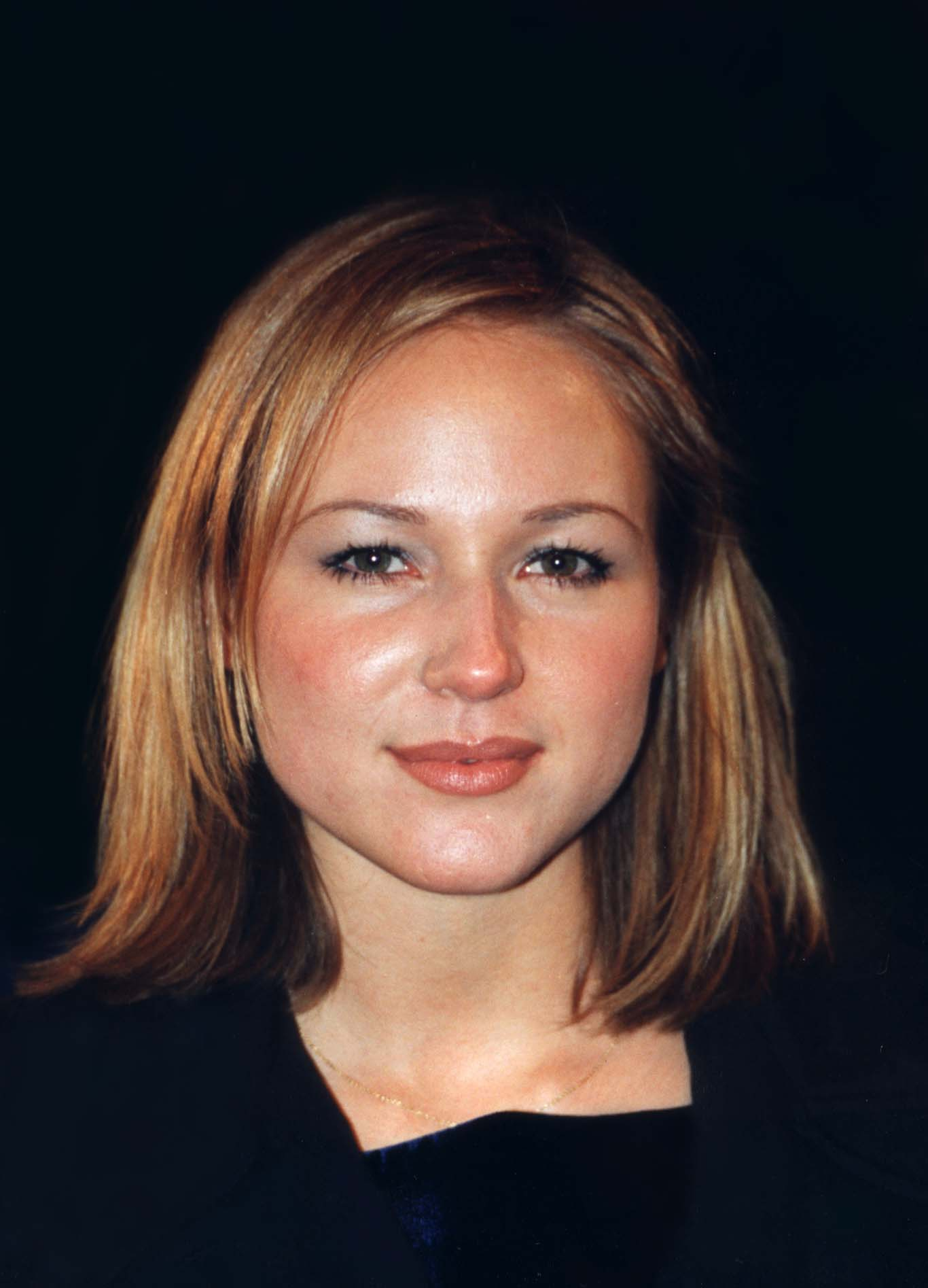
"You Were Meant for Me" / "Foolish Games" by Jewel (pictured) was number two on the Year-End list, despite never reaching the top of the Hot 100.

This is a list of Billboard's Top Hot 100 songs of 1997.

The list is also notable for featuring 14 songs that appeared in 1996's list, repeat onto to this list. With the highest being Toni Braxton's "Un-Break My Heart", which barely made it on to 1996's list at number 81 only accounting six weeks of its run in the 1996 chart year, and repeat higher at number 4 in 1997's. Only four more year-end list would repeat the same feat, that being 2010, 2016, 2018 and 2022.

No.	Title	Artist(s)
1	"Candle in the Wind 1997" / "Something About the Way You Look Tonight"	Elton John
2	"You Were Meant for Me" / "Foolish Games"	Jewel
3	"I'll Be Missing You"	Puff Daddy and Faith Evans featuring 112
4	"Un-Break My Heart"	Toni Braxton
5	"Can't Nobody Hold Me Down"	Puff Daddy featuring Mase
6	"I Believe I Can Fly"	R. Kelly
7	"Don't Let Go (Love)"	En Vogue
8	"Return of the Mack"	Mark Morrison
9	"How Do I Live"	LeAnn Rimes
10	"Wannabe"	Spice Girls
11	"Quit Playing Games (With My Heart)"	Backstreet Boys
12	"MMMBop"	Hanson
13	"For You I Will"	Monica
14	"You Make Me Wanna..."	Usher
15	"Bitch"	Meredith Brooks
16	"Nobody"	Keith Sweat featuring Athena Cage
17	"Semi-Charmed Life"	Third Eye Blind
18	"Barely Breathing"	Duncan Sheik
19	"Hard to Say I'm Sorry"	Az Yet featuring Peter Cetera
20	"Mo Money Mo Problems"	The Notorious B.I.G. featuring Puff Daddy and Mase
21	"The Freshmen"	The Verve Pipe
22	"I Want You"	Savage Garden
23	"No Diggity"	Blackstreet featuring Dr. Dre
24	"I Belong to You (Every Time I See Your Face)"	Rome
25	"Hypnotize"	The Notorious B.I.G.
26	"Every Time I Close My Eyes"	Babyface
27	"In My Bed"	Dru Hill
28	"Say You'll Be There"	Spice Girls
29	"Do You Know (What It Takes)"	Robyn
30	"4 Seasons of Loneliness"	Boyz II Men
31	"G.H.E.T.T.O.U.T."	Changing Faces
32	"Honey"	Mariah Carey
33	"I Believe in You and Me"	Whitney Houston
34	"Da' Dip"	Freak Nasty
35	"2 Become 1"	Spice Girls
36	"All for You"	Sister Hazel
37	"Cupid"	112
38	"Where Have All the Cowboys Gone?"	Paula Cole
39	"Sunny Came Home"	Shawn Colvin
40	"It's Your Love"	Tim McGraw with Faith Hill
41	"Ooh Aah... Just a Little Bit"	Gina G
42	"Mouth"	Merril Bainbridge
43	"All Cried Out"	Allure featuring 112
44	"I'm Still in Love with You"	New Edition
45	"Invisible Man"	98 Degrees
46	"Not Tonight"	Lil' Kim featuring Da Brat, Left Eye, Missy Elliott and Angie Martinez
47	"Look into My Eyes"	Bone Thugs-n-Harmony
48	"Get It Together"	702
49	"All by Myself"	Celine Dion
50	"It's All Coming Back to Me Now"	Celine Dion
51	"My Love Is the Shhh!"	Somethin' for the People featuring Trina & Tamara
52	"Where Do You Go"	No Mercy
53	"I Finally Found Someone"	Barbra Streisand and Bryan Adams
54	"I'll Be"	Foxy Brown featuring Jay-Z
55	"If It Makes You Happy"	Sheryl Crow
56	"Never Make a Promise"	Dru Hill
57	"When You Love a Woman"	Journey
58	"Up Jumps da Boogie"	Magoo and Timbaland
59	"I Don't Want To" / "I Love Me Some Him"	Toni Braxton
60	"Everyday Is a Winding Road"	Sheryl Crow
61	"Cold Rock a Party"	MC Lyte
62	"Pony"	Ginuwine
63	"Building a Mystery"	Sarah McLachlan
64	"I Love You Always Forever"	Donna Lewis
65	"Your Woman"	White Town
66	"C U When U Get There"	Coolio featuring 40 Thevz
67	"Change the World"	Eric Clapton
68	"My Baby Daddy"	B-Rock and the Bizz
69	"Tubthumping"	Chumbawamba
70	"Gotham City"	R. Kelly
71	"Last Night"	Az Yet
72	"ESPN Presents The Jock Jam"	Various Artists
73	"Big Daddy"	Heavy D
74	"What About Us"	Total
75	"Smile"	Scarface featuring 2Pac and Johnny P.
76	"What's on Tonight"	Montell Jordan
77	"Secret Garden"	Bruce Springsteen
78	"The One I Gave My Heart To"	Aaliyah
79	"Fly Like an Eagle"	Seal
80	"No Time"	Lil' Kim featuring Puff Daddy
81	"Naked Eye"	Luscious Jackson
82	"Macarena (Bayside Boys Mix)"	Los del Río
83	"On & On"	Erykah Badu
84	"Don't Wanna Be a Player"	Joe
85	"I Shot the Sheriff"	Warren G
86	"You Should Be Mine (Don't Waste Your Time)"	Brian McKnight featuring Mase
87	"Don't Cry for Me Argentina"	Madonna
88	"Someone"	SWV featuring Puff Daddy
89	"Go the Distance"	Michael Bolton
90	"One More Time"	Real McCoy
91	"Butta Love"	Next
92	"Coco Jamboo"	Mr. President
93	"Twisted"	Keith Sweat
94	"Barbie Girl"	Aqua
95	"When You're Gone" / "Free to Decide"	The Cranberries
96	"Let Me Clear My Throat"	DJ Kool
97	"I Like It"	The Blackout All-Stars
98	"You're Makin' Me High" / "Let It Flow"	Toni Braxton
99	"You Must Love Me"	Madonna
100	"Let It Go"	Ray J

== See also ==
- 1997 in music
- Billboard Year-End Hot R&B Singles of 1997
- Billboard Year-End Hot Rap Singles of 1997
- List of Billboard Hot 100 number-one singles of 1997
- List of Billboard Hot 100 top-ten singles in 1997
