= List of Billboard Hot 100 top-ten singles in 1997 =

This is a list of singles that charted in the top ten of the Billboard Hot 100 during 1997. During this year, "How Do I Live" by LeAnn Rimes became the longest-running top-ten single, breaking a record for 32 weeks (a record that went unmatched for over nineteen years).

Puff Daddy and Mase each had four top-ten hits in 1997, tying them for the most top-ten hits during the year.

== Top-ten singles ==
Key

- ↑ – indicates single's top 10 entry was also its Hot 100 debut
- † – indicates Best performing song of the year
- (#) – 1997 Year-end top 10 single position and rank

List of Billboard Hot 100 top ten singles which peaked in 1997
Top ten entry date	Single	Artist(s)	Peak	Peak date	Weeks in top ten
Singles from 1996
November 30	"Don't Let Go (Love)" (#7)	En Vogue	2	January 18	17
November 30	"I'm Still In Love With You"	New Edition	7	January 11	11
December 28	"I Believe in You and Me" ↑	Whitney Houston	4	February 1	9
Singles from 1997
January 18	"Fly Like an Eagle"	Seal	10	January 18	1
January 25	"If It Makes You Happy"	Sheryl Crow	10	January 25	1
February 1	"Wannabe" (#10)	Spice Girls	1	February 22	15
February 1	"You Were Meant for Me" (#2)	Jewel	2	April 19	19
February 8	"Can't Nobody Hold Me Down" (#5)	Puff Daddy featuring Mase	1	March 22	16
February 15	"Every Time I Close My Eyes"	Babyface featuring Mariah Carey and Kenny G	6	March 22	9
February 22	"In My Bed"	Dru Hill	4	March 29	9
February 22	"Discothèque" ↑	U2	10	February 22	1
March 1	"Don't Cry for Me Argentina"	Madonna	8	March 1	3
March 15	"For You I Will" ↑	Monica	4	April 19	12
March 22	"Get It Together"	702	10	March 22	1
March 29	"All By Myself" ↑	Céline Dion	4	April 5	5
March 29	"I'll Be"	Foxy Brown featuring Jay-Z	7	April 12	4
April 12	"I Want You"	Savage Garden	4	May 10	8
April 26	"Hypnotize" ↑	The Notorious B.I.G	1	May 3	8
April 26	"Return of the Mack" (#8)	Mark Morrison	2	June 7	15
April 26	"Hard to Say I'm Sorry"	Az Yet featuring Peter Cetera	8	May 3	5
April 26	"Where Have All the Cowboys Gone?"	Paula Cole	8	May 10	6
May 3	"My Baby Daddy"	B-Rock & the Bizz	10	May 3	1
May 10	"MMMBop"	Hanson	1	May 24	12
May 17	"I Belong to You (Every Time I See Your Face)"	Rome	6	June 7	9
May 24	"Say You'll Be There" ↑	Spice Girls	3	May 31	9
May 31	"The Freshmen"	The Verve Pipe	5	June 7	6
June 7	"G.H.E.T.T.O.U.T"	Changing Faces	8	June 7	5
June 7	"It's Your Love"	Tim McGraw and Faith Hill	7	July 19	6
June 14	"I'll Be Missing You" ↑ (#3)	Puff Daddy featuring Faith Evans and 112	1	June 14	17
June 14	"Bitch"	Meredith Brooks	2	July 12	11
June 21	"Look Into My Eyes" ↑	Bone Thugs-n-Harmony	4	June 21	7
July 12	"Sunny Came Home" ↑	Shawn Colvin	7	July 26	6
July 12	"Do You Know (What It Takes)"	Robyn	7	August 2	8
July 12	"Quit Playing Games (with My Heart)"	Backstreet Boys	2	September 6	18
July 26	"Semi-Charmed Life"	Third Eye Blind	4	August 9	14
July 26	"Gotham City"	R. Kelly	9	August 2	2
August 2	"Mo Money Mo Problems" ↑	The Notorious B.I.G. featuring Puff Daddy and Mase	1	August 30	12
August 9	"How Do I Live" (#9)	LeAnn Rimes	2	December 13	32
August 9	"Not Tonight"	Lil' Kim featuring Da Brat, Missy Elliott, Angie Martinez, and Left Eye	6	August 9	5
August 9	"Never Make a Promise" ↑	Dru Hill	7	August 23	6
August 16	"2 Become 1" ↑	Spice Girls	4	September 6	9
September 6	"You Make Me Wanna..."	Usher	2	October 25	23
September 6	"Barbie Girl" ↑	Aqua	7	September 6	3
September 13	"Honey" ↑	Mariah Carey	1	September 13	8
September 20	"Foolish Games"	Jewel	7	November 1	9
September 27	"4 Seasons of Loneliness" ↑	Boyz II Men	1	October 4	10
October 11	"Candle in the Wind 1997" / "Something About the Way You Look Tonight" ↑ † (#1)	Elton John	1	October 11	17
October 18	"All Cried Out"	Allure featuring 112	4	November 22	8
October 25	"My Love Is the Shhh!"	Somethin' for the People featuring Trina & Tamara	4	November 29	10
November 1	"Tubthumping"	Chumbawamba	6	November 29	12
November 8	"The One I Gave My Heart To"	Aaliyah	9	November 15	3
November 15	"My Body"	LSG	4	December 6	11
November 22	"Feel So Good"	Mase	5	December 13	9
November 29	"Show Me Love"	Robyn	7	November 29	10
December 6	"I Will Come to You"	Hanson	9	December 13	2

=== 1996 peaks ===
List of Billboard Hot 100 top ten singles in 1997 which peaked in 1996
Top ten entry date	Single	Artist(s)	Peak	Peak date	Weeks in top ten
June 29	"Macarena (Bayside Boys Remix)"	Los Del Rio	1	August 3	23
September 14	"It's All Coming Back to Me Now"	Céline Dion	2	October 26	19
October 12	"Last Night"	Az Yet	9	October 19	4
October 19	"No Diggity"	Blackstreet featuring Dr. Dre	1	November 9	18
October 26	"Mouth"	Merril Bainbridge	4	November 23	15
November 2	"Un-Break My Heart" (#4)	Toni Braxton	1	December 7	25
November 9	"Nobody"	Keith Sweat featuring Athena Cage	3	December 7	18
December 7	"I Finally Found Someone"	Barbra Streisand and Bryan Adams	8	December 7	5
December 21	"I Believe I Can Fly" (#6)	R. Kelly	2	December 21	16

=== 1998 peaks ===
List of Billboard Hot 100 top ten singles in 1997 which peaked in 1998
Top ten entry date	Single	Artist(s)	Peak	Peak date	Weeks in top ten
December 13	"Been Around the World" / "It's All About the Benjamins"	Puff Daddy featuring The Notorious B.I.G. and Mase	2	January 3	12
December 20	"Together Again" ↑	Janet Jackson	1	January 31	14
December 27	"Truly Madly Deeply"	Savage Garden	1	January 17	26

== See also ==
- 1997 in music
- List of Billboard Hot 100 number ones of 1997
- Billboard Year-End Hot 100 singles of 1997
