= Billboard Year-End Hot Rap Singles of 1997 =

American music chart

This is a list of Billboard magazine's Top Hot Rap Singles of 1997.

No.	Title	Artist(s)
1	"I'll Be Missing You"	Puff Daddy and Faith Evans featuring 112
2	"Can't Nobody Hold Me Down"	Puff Daddy featuring Mase
3	"Cold Rock a Party"	MC Lyte featuring Missy Elliott
4	"I'll Be"	Foxy Brown featuring Jay-Z
5	"Hypnotize"	The Notorious B.I.G.
6	"No Time"	Lil' Kim featuring Puff Daddy
7	"Up Jumps da Boogie"	Timbaland & Magoo
8	"Not Tonight"	Lil' Kim featuring Angie Martinez, Da Brat, Left Eye and Missy Elliott
9	"Big Daddy"	Heavy D
10	"Da' Dip"	Freak Nasty
11	"Mo Money Mo Problems"	The Notorious B.I.G. featuring Puff Daddy and Mase
12	"Let Me Clear My Throat"	DJ Kool
13	"My Baby Daddy"	B-Rock and the Bizz
14	"Look into My Eyes"	Bone Thugs-n-Harmony
15	"Smile"	Scarface featuring 2Pac and Johnny P.
16	"The Theme (It's Party Time)"	Tracey Lee
17	"I Shot the Sheriff"	Warren G
18	"Ghetto Love"	Da Brat featuring T-Boz
19	"Luchini AKA This Is It"	Camp Lo
20	"Take It to the Streets"	Rampage featuring Billy Lawrence
21	"I Miss My Homies"	Master P featuring Pimp C and Silkk the Shocker
22	"Nothin' But the Cavi Hit"	Mack 10 and Tha Dogg Pound
23	"Jazzy Belle"	Outkast
24	"Whateva Man"	Redman
25	"What They Do"	The Roots
26	"Feel So Good"	Mase
27	"Things'll Never Change" / "Rapper's Ball	E-40 featuring Bo-Roc
28	"Street Dreams"	Nas
29	"If I Could Change"	Master P featuring Steady Mobb'n, Mia X, Mo B. Dick and O'dell
30	"Get Up"	Lost Boyz
31	"That's Right"	DJ Taz featuring Raheem the Dream
32	"I Always Feel Like"	TRU
33	"Backyard Boogie"	Mack 10
34	"ATLiens" / "Wheelz of Steel"	Outkast
35	"Gangstas Make the World Go Round"	Westside Connection
36	"Smokin' Me Out"	Warren G featuring Ronald Isley
37	"Bow Down"	Westside Connection
38	"C U When U Get There"	Coolio
39	"We Trying to Stay Alive"	Wyclef Jean featuring John Forté and Pras
40	"Do G's Get to Go to Heaven?"	Richie Rich
41	"Runnin'"	2Pac, The Notorious B.I.G., Dramacydal, Stretch and Radio
42	"If U Stay Ready"	Suga Free
43	"Just Another Case"	CRU featuring Slick Rick
44	"Stop the Gunfight"	Trapp featuring 2Pac and The Notorious B.I.G.
45	"T.O.N.Y. (Top of New York)"	Capone-N-Noreaga
46	"Sho Nuff"	Tela featuring 8Ball & MJG
47	"How Do U Want It" / "California Love"	2Pac featuring K-Ci & JoJo
48	"Hip Hop Drunkies"	Tha Alkaholiks featuring Ol' Dirty Bastard
49	"Avenues"	Refugee Camp All-Stars
50	"Emotions"	Twista

== See also ==
- 1997 in music
- Billboard Year-End Hot 100 singles 1997
- Billboard Year-End Hot R&B Singles of 1997
- List of Billboard number-one rap singles of the 1997
