= Do It Just Like a Rockstar =

Single by Freak Nasty

from the album Freaknotic
- Released: January 14, 2005
- Recorded: 2005
- Genre: Rap rock; hip-hop; crunk
- Length: 4:10
- Label: Hard Hood
- Songwriter: Freak Nasty
- Producers: Dat Bad Boy of Da South; Freak Nasty

Freak Nasty singles chronology
"Da' Dip" (1996)	"Do It Just Like a Rockstar" (2005)

"Do It Just Like a Rockstar" is a song by American hip-hop artist Freak Nasty. The song was released on iTunes on January 14, 2005. It reached number 45 on the Billboard Hot 100 in May 2007, after selling approximately 30,000 digital downloads on the iTunes Store. It was erroneously listed under the title of "Party Like a Rockstar", which caused confusion from iTunes users looking for the Shop Boyz song of the same name. On the Billboard issue dated May 26, 2007, the Shop Boyz were at number 54 on the Hot 100 due to strong airplay while Freak Nasty was number 56 due to strong sales. The following week, after the Shop Boyz had an official digital release of their single, "Party Like a Rockstar" shot to number two while "Do It Just Like a Rockstar" dropped completely off the chart.

== Chart positions ==
Chart (2007)	Peak position
US Billboard Hot 100	45
