= This Time It's Personal =

This Time It's Personal may refer to:

== Music ==
- Periphery II: This Time It's Personal, a 2012 album by Periphery
- This Time It's Personal (Somethin' for the People album), 1997
- This Time It's Personal, a 2000 album by Fury of Five
- This Time... It's Personal, a 2000 album by Michael Ball
- This Time It's Personal (John Cooper Clarke and Hugh Cornwell album), 2017

== Other uses ==
- "This time, it's personal", marketing tagline for the 1987 film Jaws: The Revenge
- WEC 7: This Time It's Personal, an American mixed martial arts event
