= Share My World (disambiguation) =

Share My World is a 1997 album by Mary J. Blige.

Share My World may also refer to:

- "Share My World", a 1962 poem by Georgia Douglas Johnson
- "Share My World", a song by DeBarge from Rhythm of the Night (album), 1985
- "Share My World", a song by Dru Hill from Dru Hill (album), 1997
- "Share My World", a 2007 song by Jason Donovan
