= Do Your Thing (7 Mile song) =

1998 single by 7 Mile

Single by 7 Mile

from the album 7 Mile
- Released: April 7, 1998
- Recorded: 1997
- Genre: R&B
- Length: 4:51 (album version); 4:10 (single edit)
- Label: Crave
- Songwriters: 7 Mile; Mark C. Rooney; Troy Oliver
- Producers: Mark C. Rooney; Troy Oliver

7 Mile singles chronology
"After" (1998)	"Do Your Thing" (1998)

Music video
- "Do Your Thing" on YouTube

"Do Your Thing" is a song by co-written and performed by 7 Mile, issued as the third and final single from their eponymous debut album. It was the group's only song to chart on the Billboard Hot 100, peaking at #50 in 1998.

== Music video ==
The official music video for the song was directed by Steve Conner.

== Chart positions ==
Chart (1998)	Peak position
US Billboard Hot 100	50
US Hot R&B/Hip-Hop Singles & Tracks (Billboard)	12
