= Christopher Erskin =

Music video director

- Occupations: Film director, music video director

Christopher Erskin is a music video director and film director.

== Filmography ==
- Johnson Family Vacation (2004)

== Videography ==
1996

- Ginuwine – "Pony" [Remix]
- Total – "What About Us?"
- Blackstreet – "(Money Can't) Buy Me Love"

1997

- Rome – "I Belong to You (Every Time I See Your Face)"
- Next Level featuring K-Borne – "I Don't Know"
- Allure featuring LL Cool J – "No Question"
- Uncle Sam – "Can You Feel It"
- Allure featuring 112 – "All Cried Out"
- God's Property – "You Are the Only One"
- Queen Pen – "Man Behind the Music"
- Simone Hines – "Yeah! Yeah! Yeah!"
- Uncle Sam – "I Don't Ever Want to See You Again"
- Dru Hill – "We're Not Making Love No More"
- Queen Pen featuring Eric Williams – "All My Love"
- Joe – "Good Girls"

1998

- 8Ball featuring Master P, Mystikal, Silkk the Shocker and Psycho Drama – "Pure Uncut"
- 8Ball – "My Homeboy's Girlfriend"
- Debelah Morgan – "I Love You"
- Mic Geronimo featuring Sean "Puffy" Combs and Kelly Price – "Nothin' Move But the Money"
- Boyz II Men – "Doin' Just Fine"
- Jon B. – "They Don't Know"
- Nicole featuring Missy "Misdemeanor" Elliott and Mocha – "Make It Hot"
- Gerald Levert – "Thinkin About It"
- Gerald Levert – "Taking Everything"
- Rufus Blaq – "Out Of Sight"
- MC Lyte – "I Can't Make a Mistake"
- Keith Sweat featuring Snoop Dogg – "Come and Get with Me"
- Nicole – "I Can't See"
- Case and Joe – "Faded Pictures"
- Mack 10 featuring Gerald Levert – "Money Just a Touch Away"
- LeVert – "Where Would I Be"

1999

- Gerald Levert featuring Antoinette Roberson – "Taking Everything" [Remix]
- Divine – "One More Try
- So Plush Featuring Ja Rule – "Damn"
- Beverly – "You Came Along"

2000

- Brian McKnight – "6, 8, 12"
- R. Kelly – "I Wish" (co-directed by R. Kelly)
- T-Boz – "My Getaway"
- Public Announcement – "Man Ain't Supposed to Cry"
- No Question – "If You Really Wanna Go"
- Talent – "Celebrity"
