= List of number-one R&B singles of 1997 (U.S.) =

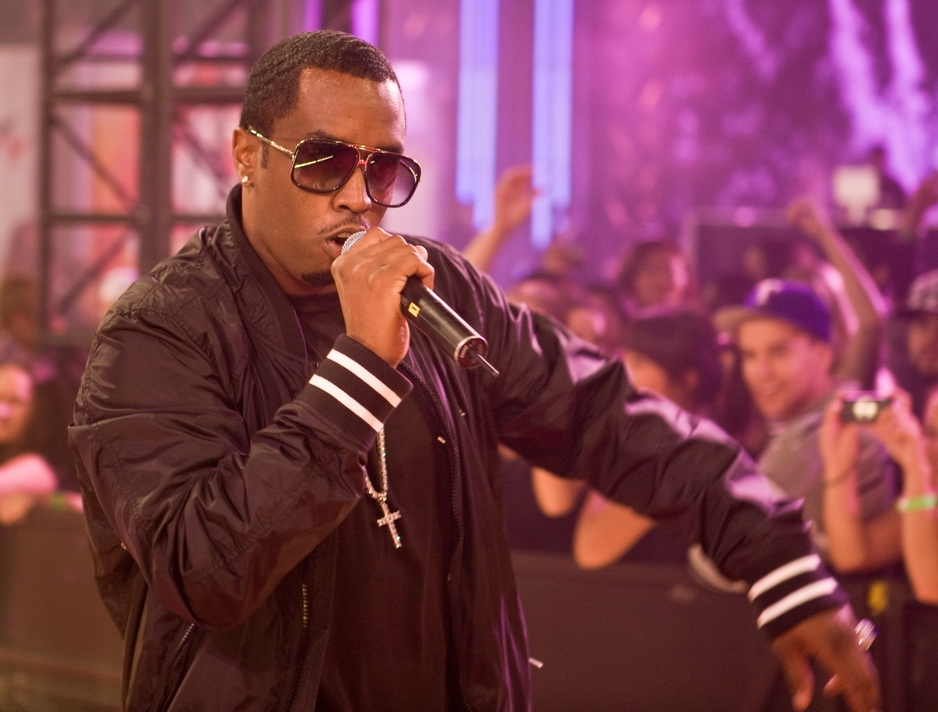
Puff Daddy (pictured in 2008) had two number ones in 1997.

These are the Billboard magazine R&B singles chart number one hits of 1997.

== Chart history ==
Key
| † | Indicates best-charting R&B single of 1997 |

| Issue date | Song | Artist | Ref. |
|---|---|---|---|
| January 4 | "I Believe I Can Fly" | R. Kelly | |
| January 11 | "I Believe I Can Fly" | R. Kelly | |
| January 18 | "I Believe I Can Fly" | R. Kelly | |
| January 25 | "Don't Let Go (Love)" | En Vogue | |
| February 1 | "I Believe I Can Fly" | R. Kelly | |
| February 8 | "On & On" | Erykah Badu | |
| February 15 | "On & On" | Erykah Badu | |
| February 22 | "In My Bed" † | Dru Hill | |
| March 1 | "In My Bed" † | Dru Hill | |
| March 8 | "Can't Nobody Hold Me Down" | Puff Daddy featuring Mase | |
| March 15 | "Can't Nobody Hold Me Down" | Puff Daddy featuring Mase | |
| March 22 | "Can't Nobody Hold Me Down" | Puff Daddy featuring Mase | |
| March 29 | "Can't Nobody Hold Me Down" | Puff Daddy featuring Mase | |
| April 5 | "Can't Nobody Hold Me Down" | Puff Daddy featuring Mase | |
| April 12 | "Can't Nobody Hold Me Down" | Puff Daddy featuring Mase | |
| April 19 | "In My Bed" † | Dru Hill | |
| April 26 | "Hypnotize" | The Notorious B.I.G. | |
| May 3 | "Hypnotize" | The Notorious B.I.G. | |
| May 10 | "Hypnotize" | The Notorious B.I.G. | |
| May 17 | "G.H.E.T.T.O.U.T." | Changing Faces | |
| May 24 | "G.H.E.T.T.O.U.T." | Changing Faces | |
| May 31 | "G.H.E.T.T.O.U.T." | Changing Faces | |
| June 7 | "G.H.E.T.T.O.U.T." | Changing Faces | |
| June 14 | "I'll Be Missing You" | Puff Daddy featuring Faith Evans and 112 | |
| June 21 | "I'll Be Missing You" | Puff Daddy featuring Faith Evans and 112 | |
| June 28 | "I'll Be Missing You" | Puff Daddy featuring Faith Evans and 112 | |
| July 5 | "I'll Be Missing You" | Puff Daddy featuring Faith Evans and 112 | |
| July 12 | "I'll Be Missing You" | Puff Daddy featuring Faith Evans and 112 | |
| July 19 | "I'll Be Missing You" | Puff Daddy featuring Faith Evans and 112 | |
| July 26 | "I'll Be Missing You" | Puff Daddy featuring Faith Evans and 112 | |
| August 2 | "I'll Be Missing You" | Puff Daddy featuring Faith Evans and 112 | |
| August 9 | "Never Make a Promise" | Dru Hill | |
| August 16 | "Never Make a Promise" | Dru Hill | |
| August 23 | "Never Make a Promise" | Dru Hill | |
| August 30 | "Never Make a Promise" | Dru Hill | |
| September 6 | "You Make Me Wanna..." | Usher | |
| September 13 | "You Make Me Wanna..." | Usher | |
| September 20 | "You Make Me Wanna..." | Usher | |
| September 27 | "You Make Me Wanna..." | Usher | |
| October 4 | "You Make Me Wanna..." | Usher | |
| October 11 | "You Make Me Wanna..." | Usher | |
| October 18 | "You Make Me Wanna..." | Usher | |
| October 25 | "You Make Me Wanna..." | Usher | |
| November 1 | "You Make Me Wanna..." | Usher | |
| November 8 | "You Make Me Wanna..." | Usher | |
| November 15 | "You Make Me Wanna..." | Usher | |
| November 22 | "My Body" | LSG | |
| November 29 | "My Body" | LSG | |
| December 6 | "My Body" | LSG | |
| December 13 | "My Body" | LSG | |
| December 20 | "My Body" | LSG | |
| December 27 | "A Song for Mama" | Boyz II Men | |

=== Chart comparisons ===
- Three songs reached number-one on the Billboard Hot 100/pop and the Hot Rap Singles charts: "Can't Nobody Hold Me Down", "Hypnotize" and "I'll Be Missing You".
- Three songs reached number-one on the Rhythmic chart: "Don't Let Go (Love)", "I'll Be Missing You" and "You Make Me Wanna..."

== See also ==
- 1997 in music
- Billboard Year-End Hot R&B Singles of 1997
- List of number-one R&B hits (United States)
- List of number-one R&B albums of 1997 (U.S.)
