= Trina & Tamara (album) =

Studio album by Trina & Tamara
- Released: May 11, 1999
- Genre: R&B
- Length: 42:47
- Label: C2/Columbia
- Producer: Katrina Powell; Tamara Powell; Randy Jackson (exec.)

Singles from Trina & Tamara
- 1. "What'd You Come Here For?" Released: March 9, 1999; 2. "Joanne" Released: July 20, 1999

Trina & Tamara is the only studio album by American contemporary R&B group Trina & Tamara, released May 11, 1999 via C2 Records (which was distributed via Columbia Records). Co-produced by the group along with Randy Jackson, it did not chart on the Billboard 200 but peaked at #99 on the Billboard R&B chart.

The album produced the singles "What'd You Come Here For?" and "Joanne". In addition to original songs, the album contains a cover of "Settle for My Love" by Patrice Rushen.

== Track listing ==
No.	Title	Writer(s)	Producer(s)	Length
1.	"What'd You Come Here For?" ( (Note: "What'd You Come Here For?" contains a sample of "Car Wash" as performed by Rose Royce.))	Katrina Powell; Tamara Powell; Curtis Wilson; Angela Slates	Curtis Wilson	4:06
2.	"Nothin New"	Katrina Powell; Tamara Powell; Angela Slates; Eric Baker; Michelle Gilliam	Eric Baker	3:33
3.	"Joanne" ( (Note: "Joanne" contains a sample of "California Dreamin'" as performed by George Benson.))	Katrina Powell; Tamara Powell; Angela Slates; Michelle Gilliam; John Phillips; Deric Angelettie	Deric Angelettie; Kanye West; J.D. Crafton (add.)	4:22
4.	"Sister"	Katrina Powell; Tamara Powell; Rick Cousin	Rick Cousin	3:59
5.	"Let's Go"	Katrina Powell; Tamara Powell; Marc Kinchen	Marc Kinchen	4:17
6.	"29"	Deborah Cox; Keith Andes; Lascelles Stephens	Keith Andes; Lascelles Stephens	4:35
7.	"Makin' Love" ( (Note: "Makin' Love" contains a sample of "Adore" as performed by Prince.))	Katrina Powell; Tamara Powell; Marc Kinchen	Marc Kinchen	4:37
8.	"Settle for My Love" (Patrice Rushen cover)	Patrice Rushen; Freddie Washington; Sheree Brown	Curtis Wilson	4:34
9.	"How Could This Be the End"	Katrina Powell; Tamara Powell; Marc Kinchen	Marc Kinchen	4:37
10.	"Blue"	Katrina Powell; Tamara Powell; Curtis Wilson; Angela Slates	Curtis Wilson	4:30
Total length:				42:47

CD Only Hidden Tracks
No.	Title	Writer(s)	Producer	Length
11.	"What'd You Come Here For?" (Remix feat. Cam'ron & 50 Cent)	Powell; Powell; Wilson; Slates	Poke & Tone	3:59
12.	"Joanne" (Clean Remix) (feat. Eve Of Destruction)	Powell; Powell; Slates; Gilliam; Phillips; Angelettie	Angelettie	4:20
Total length:				51:29

== Charts ==
Chart (1999)	Peak position
US R&B Albums (Billboard)	99
