= Sunny Days (album) =

Studio album by Allure
- Released: November 13, 2001
- Genre: R&B
- Length: 44:40
- Label: MCA
- Producer: Allstar; Scott Booker; Full Force; Troy Johnson; Kay Gee; Kobie; Ike Lee III; Chris "C.L." Liggio; Larry "Precision" Gates; Rick St. Hillaire; Rhemario Webber

Allure chronology
Allure (1997)	Sunny Days (2001)	Chapter III (2004)

Sunny Days is the second studio album released by American girl band Allure. It was released by MCA Records on November 13, 2001, in the United States. Conceived after the folding of their debut label, singer Mariah Carey's record company Crave Records, it marked the quartet's debut and only release with MCA as well as their first full-length release in four years. Sunny Days peaked at number 68 on the US Billboard Top R&B/Hip Hop Albums.

== Critical reception ==
Professional ratings
Review scores
Source	Rating
Allmusic	3/5 stars

Allmusic editor Liana Jonas found that "within minutes of listening to the disc, audiences will think, 'this is like all the other girl-group R&B fare on the radio today'. And it is. Sunny Days is rife with contemporary danceable grooves, guest flows, urban flavor, and several grab-the-Kleenex ballads. And what's wrong with this? [...] To be sure, the band has matured. The songs sound more seasoned this go-round [...] Also, their voices sound more robust and confident [...] Welcome back, Allure. Here's hoping for more sunny days."

== Track listing ==
No.	Title	Producer(s)	Length
1.	"Bump" (featuring Nucci Rey O)	Larry "Precision" Gates; Rick St. Hilaire	3:35
2.	"Kool wit Me"	Allen "Allstar" Gordon, Jr.	3:47
3.	"Wore Out Your Welcome"	Troy Johnson	4:46
4.	"Enjoy Yourself"/"Love Me (Interlude)"	Chris "C.L." Liggio; Kay Gee; Kobie	4:08
5.	"Lady"	Ike Lee III	5:44
6.	"Never Let You Go"	Rhemario Webber	4:08
7.	"Can't Live Without You"	Ike Lee III; Scott Booker^{[a]}	4:19
8.	"The Shore (Wanna Be Your Lady)" (featuring Miri Ben-Ari)	St. Hilaire	4:44
9.	"Earn My Trust"	Full Force	4:29
10.	"Only for a While (Interlude)"	Webber	1:37
11.	"Sunny Day"	Gates	3:27

Japan bonus track
No.	Title	Producer(s)	Length
12.	"Simon Sez"	Gates	2:59

Notes

- ^{^a} denotes additional producer

== Charts ==
Chart (2001)	Peak position
US Top R&B/Hip-Hop Albums (Billboard)	68
