= Anquette =

American contemporary R&B group

- Origin: Miami, Florida
- Genres: Contemporary R&B
- Years active: 1986-1997
- Labels: Luke; Vision

Anquette is an American contemporary R&B group from Miami, Florida, U.S. The group featured rapper Anquette Allen and her backup, known as the "Throw the P Girls," which included Keia Red and Ray Ray (also known as Raydient Grace Silva and Keta Mansfield). They debuted with their answer version of the 2 Live Crew's "Throw the D", titled "Throw the P" (1986). Anquette's debut LP Respect (1988) featured a version of Aretha Franklin's "Respect" as well as "I Will Always Be There for You", which peaked at #76 on Billboard's Hot R&B/Hip-Hop Singles and Tracks chart in 1989) and a rap track titled "Janet Reno". Other noteworthy tunes include "Ghetto Style" and "Shake It (Do the 61st)". Anquette came back in 1997 with the tune "My Baby Mama," an answer rap to B-Rock and the Bizz's "My Baby Daddy".

== Discography ==
- 1988 Respect (Skyywalker). Billboard Top R&B/Hip-Hop Albums peak #41.
