= Rome (Rome album) =

Studio album by Rome
- Released: April 15, 1997
- Recorded: 1996–1997
- Genre: R&B
- Length: 62:22
- Label: RCA
- Producer: Gerald Baillergeau; Victor Merritt

Rome chronology
Rome (1997)	To Infinity (Thank You) (1999)

Singles from Rome
- 1. "I Belong to You (Every Time I See Your Face)" Released: February 17, 1997; 2. "Do You Like This" Released: July 14, 1997; 3. "Crazy Love" Released: October 27, 1997

Professional ratings
Review scores
Source	Rating
AllMusic	4/5 stars

Rome is the debut studio album by American contemporary R&B singer Rome, released on April 15, 1997, via RCA Records. The album peaked at No. 30 on the Billboard 200 and at No. 7 on the Billboard R&B chart.

Three singles were released from the album: "I Belong to You (Every Time I See Your Face)", "Do You Like This" and "Crazy Love". "I Belong to You" was the most successful single from the album, peaking at No. 6 on the Billboard Hot 100 in 1997. The album contains a cover of Bobby Womack's "That's the Way I Feel About Cha".

The album was certified platinum by the RIAA on December 17, 1997.

== Track listing ==
All tracks are written by Gerald Baillergeau and Jerome Woods, except "Do Me Right" written by Jerome Woods; and "That's The Way I Feel About Cha" written by Jimmy Grisby, Joe Hicks and Bobby Womack

No.	Title	Length
1.	"I Belong to You (Every Time I See Your Face)"	4:33
2.	"Do You Like This"	4:54
3.	"Crazy Love"	4:13
4.	"Just Once, Once More, Three Times"	5:34
5.	"I Gotta Be Down"	5:19
6.	"Do Me Right"	3:49
7.	"That's The Way I Feel About Cha" (Bobby Womack cover)	4:22
8.	"Real Love"	6:08
9.	"Feelin' Kinda Good"	3:57
10.	"Let Me Come Home"	5:24
11.	"Never Find Another Love Like Mine"	4:12
12.	"Real Joy"	5:05
13.	"Heaven"	4:52
Total length:		62:22

== Charts ==
=== Weekly charts ===
Chart (1997)	Peak position
US Billboard 200	30
US Top R&B/Hip-Hop Albums (Billboard)	7

=== Year-end charts ===
Chart (1997)	Position
US Billboard 200	106
US Top R&B/Hip-Hop Albums (Billboard)	33

== Certifications ==
Region	Certification	Certified units/sales
United States (RIAA)	Platinum	1,000,000^{^}
^{^} Shipments figures based on certification alone.
