= Danesha Starr =

Danesha Starr Known as Dee Dee Simon is an R&B Soul singer known for her hit "As Long As I Live". The song was released in 1998 on the Interscope label and featured Rome. It reached #27 on Billboard's R&B/Hip-Hop Singles chart. A video for the single was filmed and released, but received little airplay. After releasing her song, Interscope merged with Geffen and A&M records and this restructuring hindered her rise. She subsequently left the music industry.

== Discography (singles) ==
- "As Long As I Live" (1998)
