= Chapter III (Allure album) =

Studio album by Allure
- Released: November 23, 2004
- Recorded: 2003–2004
- Genre: R&B
- Label: Tru Warier; Lightyear
- Producer: Ron Artest

Allure chronology
Sunny Days (2001)	Chapter III (2004)	Time's Up (2010)

Chapter III is the third album released by American band Allure in 2004.

== Track listing ==
1. Intro - 1:06
2. Hate 2 Luv U (Erika Nuri) - 3:40
3. Relax and Unwind (Chris Stewart) - 4:03
4. Let Em Go (Alia Davis/Lalisha McLean/Akissa Mendez) - 3:56
5. Long Lost Love (featuring Braska) (Alia Davis/Lalisha McLean/Akissa Mendez) - 4:32
6. I Think I'm in Love (Alia Davis/Lalisha McLean/Akissa Mendez) - 4:12
7. Sitting at Home (Alia Davis/Lalisha McLean/Akissa Mendez) - 3:24
8. Bitter Sweet (Maine Laughton/Alia Davis/Lalisha McLean/Akissa Mendez) - 4:17
9. Can't Stay Here with You (Jeff Germain/Alia Davis/Lalisha McLean/Akissa Mendez) - 3:59
10. Uh Oh (Leaving with Me) [featuring Elephant Man] (Nwosobi Obi/Ainsworth Prasad/Tanya White Aka Freckles) - 3:45
11. Watch Ya (Dorian Hardnett/Chris Stewart) - 3:42
12. Frustration (Dorian Hardnett/Chris Stewart) - 4:19
13. Gospel Interlude - 1:23
14. Stay (Alia Davis/Lalisha McLean/Akissa Mendez) - 5:02
15. I Think I'm in Love (Remix) [featuring Joe Budden] (Alia Davis/Lalisha McLean/Akissa Mendez) - 4:52
16. I Feel So - 3:33

=== Bonus tracks ===
1. You Are the Man [UK Bonus Track]
2. Hate 2 Luv U [Remix]

== Singles ==
1. Uh Oh
2. I Think I'm in Love
3. Frustration (US Radio Only)
4. Hate 2 Luv U (Europe Only)
