= Michelle Thomas =

American actress (1968–1998)

- Thomas in 1996
- Born: Michelle Doris Thomas; September 23, 1968; Brookline, Massachusetts, U.S.
- Died: December 23, 1998 (aged 30); New York City, U.S.
- Resting place: Rosedale Cemetery, Orange, New Jersey, U.S.
- Occupations: Actress, comedian
- Years active: 1983–1998
- Known for: Justine Phillips (The Cosby Show); Myra Monkhouse (Family Matters); Callie Rogers (The Young and the Restless)
- Father: Dennis Thomas

Michelle Doris Thomas (September 23, 1968 – December 23, 1998) was an American actress. She played Justine Phillips on the NBC sitcom The Cosby Show (1988–1990), Myra Monkhouse on the ABC/CBS sitcom Family Matters (1993–1998), and Callie Rogers on the CBS soap opera The Young and the Restless (1998).

== Early life and education ==
Michelle Doris Thomas was born in Brookline, Massachusetts, on September 23, 1968, to Phynjuar "Penwah" Thomas, a stage actress, and musician father Dennis "Dee Tee" Thomas (1951–2021), a saxophonist and founding member of the band Kool & the Gang. Thomas grew up in Montclair, New Jersey, and graduated from West Essex High School in 1987.

As a child, she would accompany her mother to her theater rehearsals and performances. Her mother was her first acting coach, and coached her throughout the course of her career. A friend of her mother who had heard Thomas sing before had requested that she enter Miss Talented Teens. Thomas was crowned Miss Talented Teen New Jersey at the state's Hal Jackson's Talented Teen pageant, and then in July 1984, at the age of 15, she was crowned Miss Talented Teen International in Montego Bay, Jamaica from among 35 state and national representatives.

== Career ==
In 1983, Thomas appeared in her first television commercial. In December 1984, she appeared with Hal Jackson on Soul Train after having won the Miss Talented Teen International pageant earlier in the year.

From 1988 to 1990, Thomas portrayed Justine Phillips, the girlfriend of Theo Huxtable, on The Cosby Show. She appeared on various television programs, including A Man Called Hawk in 1989 and Thea in 1994. Thomas had a role in Dream Date in 1989 and had a small role in Hangin' with the Homeboys in 1991.

Thomas appeared in music videos for Mint Condition, Chubb Rock, and Dru Hill. Her publicist was Kahdijah Bell, daughter of Ronald Bell of Kool & the Gang. Thomas was a guest host of the weekly music series Soul Train in May 1996 and March 1997.

From 1993 to 1998, she portrayed the role of Myra Monkhouse, the girlfriend of Steve Urkel, on Family Matters. After the sitcom ended in 1998, Thomas portrayed Callie Rogers, an aspiring singer and love interest of Malcolm Winters, on the daytime soap The Young and the Restless. In October 1998, Thomas took a medical leave from the series due to her ill health. Thomas had been in the studio recording music before her sudden turn in health. She appeared posthumously in the role of Anne in the film Unbowed in 1999.

== Health and death ==
In August 1997, Thomas was diagnosed with a rare cancer, an intra-abdominal desmoplastic small-round-cell tumor (DSRCT). Thomas never smoked or drank alcohol, and was a vegetarian. Her mother added that "they'd give her a sedation that was supposed to put her out for 20 minutes and she'd be asleep for four days. Her body couldn't take it." Thomas underwent surgery to remove a lemon-sized tumor in early 1998. She underwent surgery again in October 1998 after a second cancerous growth ruptured.

On December 23, 1998, at the age of 30, Thomas died as a result of a desmoplastic tumor in New York City, at Manhattan's Memorial Sloan Kettering Cancer Center. Malcolm-Jamal Warner, Thomas's longtime friend and former boyfriend, was among those at her bedside. On December 26, 1998, a Muslim funeral service was held, per her request. She was buried in New Jersey.

== Filmography ==
=== Film ===
Year	Title	Role	Notes
1991	Hangin' with the Homeboys	Telemarketing Operator	
1999	Unbowed	Anna	Released posthumously

=== Television ===
Year	Title	Role	Notes
1988–1990	The Cosby Show	Justine Phillips	8 episodes
1989	A Man Called Hawk	Ruthie Carver	Episode: "Choice of Chance"
1989	Dream Date	Sally Palmer	Television film
1993–1998	Family Matters	Myra Monkhouse	55 episodes
1994	Thea	Keanda	2 episodes
1996	Duckman	(Voice role)	Episode: "Exile in Guyville"
1997	Malcolm & Eddie	Brooke Bellamy	Episode: "Roofless People"
1998	The Young and the Restless	Callie Rogers	38 episodes

=== Music videos ===
Year	Title	Artist
1996	"What Kind of Man Would I Be"	Mint Condition
1997	"Beef"	Chubb Rock
1997	"Never Make a Promise"	Dru Hill

== Honors ==
Year	Award	Category	Title of work	Result
1999	NAACP Image Awards	Outstanding Actress in a Daytime Drama Series	The Young and the Restless	Nominated
