= Head over Heels (Allure song) =

Single by Allure featuring Nas

from the album Allure
- Released: February 25, 1997
- Recorded: 1996
- Genre: R&B; hip hop
- Length: 4:11
- Label: Crave
- Songwriters: Jean-Claude Olivier, Samuel Barnes, Marlon Williams, Shawn Moltke, Mariah Carey, Nasir Jones
- Producers: Mariah Carey, Jean-Claude Olivier, Samuel Barnes

Allure singles chronology
"Head over Heels" (1997)	"All Cried Out" (1997)

Music video
- "Head over Heels" on YouTube

Nas singles chronology
"The Message" (1997)	"Head over Heels" (1997)	"Love Is All We Need" (1997)

"Head over Heels" is the debut single by American girl group Allure, released in February 1997. It is from their 1997 eponymous debut album. The song features a rap by American rapper Nas, and also contains a sample of "The Bridge" by MC Shan. It peaked at No. 35 on the Billboard Hot 100.

== Critical reception ==
Ralph Tee from Music Week's RM commented, "Mariah Carey launches her new label through Epic with this bump'n'grindin' street soul churner by these four New York soul divas. To help things along, Nas makes a guest appearance with a few words, while Mariah herself appears briefly in the video. As a song it's a little predictable, but its melody grows on you after a few spins and, considering everybody involved, you can only expect this to do well."

== Music video ==
The official music video for the song was directed by Diane Martel.

== Charts ==
=== Weekly charts ===
Chart (1997)	Peak position
New Zealand (Recorded Music NZ)	18
Scotland Singles (OCC)	58
UK Singles (OCC)	18
UK Dance (OCC)	6
UK Hip Hop/R&B (OCC)	3
US Billboard Hot 100	35
US Hot R&B/Hip-Hop Songs (Billboard)	17
US Rhythmic Airplay (Billboard)	20

=== Year-end charts ===
Chart (1997)	Position
UK Urban (Music Week)	12
US Hot R&B/Hip-Hop Songs (Billboard)	80
