= 7 Mile (group) =

American contemporary R&B group

- Origin: Detroit, Michigan, United States
- Genres: R&B
- Years active: 1990s
- Label: Crave
- Past members: Luther "Squeak" Jackson; Seantezz "Tezz" Robinson; Deion "D" Lucas; Glynis "Lil' G" Martin Jr.

7 Mile was an American contemporary R&B group active in the late 1990s. The group consisted of Luther Jackson, Glynis Martin, Seantezz Robinson and Deion Lucas.

The group released their eponymous debut album in 1998 on Mariah Carey's label Crave Records. The only song from the album to chart on the Billboard Hot 100 was the third single, "Do Your Thing", which peaked at #50.

== Discography ==
=== Albums ===
| Year | Album | Peak chart positions | |
| Year | Album | U.S. R&B | U.S. Heatseekers |
|---|---|---|---|
| 1998 | 7 Mile | 64 | 43 |

=== Singles ===
| Year | Song | Peak chart positions | | Album |
| Year | Song | U.S. Hot 100 | U.S. R&B | Album |
|---|---|---|---|---|
| 1997 | "Just a Memory" | — | 45 | 7 Mile |
| 1998 | "After"^{A} | — | — | 7 Mile |
| 1998 | "Do Your Thing" | 50 | 12 | 7 Mile |

A. Also appears on the Trippin' soundtrack.
