= 7 Mile (album) =

Studio album by 7 Mile
- Released: April 28, 1998
- Recorded: 1997; The Hit Factory; Sony Music Studios; New York City, New York
- Genre: R&B
- Length: 61:59
- Label: Crave
- Producer: Mark C. Rooney (exec.), Roger Yopp (exec.), Marcus Devine, Stevie J, Troy Oliver, J Dub, Mariah Carey, Mark Morales, Walter Afanasieff, Joe Thomas

Singles from 7 Mile
- 1. "Just a Memory" Released: December 9, 1997; 2. "After" Released: 1998; 3. "Do Your Thing" Released: April 7, 1998

Professional ratings
Review scores
Source	Rating
AllMusic	3/5 stars

7 Mile is the only studio album by American contemporary R&B group 7 Mile, released April 28, 1998 via Crave Records. The album peaked at No. 64 on the Billboard R&B chart and No. 43 on the Heatseekers chart.

Three singles were released from the album: "Just a Memory", "After" and "Do Your Thing". "Do Your Thing" was the only song from the group to chart on the Billboard Hot 100, peaking at #50.

== Track listing ==
- Songwriting and production credits adapted from liner notes.

No.	Title	Writer(s)	Length
1.	"Without You" (Intro)	Matt Devine	1:41
2.	"Just a Memory"	Kenny Greene, Steven Jordan	5:25
3.	"Do Your Thing"	Troy Oliver, Mark C. Rooney	4:51
4.	"Looking for Somebody"	Jeffrey Walker, Gordon Chambers	6:02
5.	"After"	Mariah Carey, Steven Jordan, Will "Sonnyboy" Turpin, M. Daniels	5:50
6.	"What You Need"	Mark Morales, Mark C. Rooney, Kenny Greene, Gabriel Jackson	4:12
7.	"What Are You Looking For"	Jeffrey Walker, Kenny Greene	5:00
8.	"Spend Some Time"	Jeffrey Walker, Luther Jackson, Glynis Martin, Seantezz Robinson, Deion Lucas	3:57
9.	"I'll Make It Right"	Jeffrey Walker	5:46
10.	"You Got My Heart"	Jeffrey Walker, Kenny Greene	4:24
11.	"Can I Come Over"	Diane Warren	4:30
12.	"I Love You" (Interlude)	Mark Morales, Mark C. Rooney, Luther Jackson, Glynis Martin, Seantezz Robinson, Deion Lucas	1:46
13.	"Learn to Love"	Michele Williams, Joshua P. Thompson, Joe Thomas	3:45
14.	"No One Else but You"	Mark C. Rooney	4:50
Total length:			1:01:59

== Chart positions ==
Chart (1998)	Peak position
US Heatseekers (Billboard)	43
US R&B Albums (Billboard)	64
