= Many Facez =

Studio album by Tracey Lee
- Released: March 25, 1997
- Studios: Master Cutting Room (New York, NY); Firehouse (New York, NY); D&D (New York, NY)
- Genre: Hip hop
- Length: 1:07:15
- Label: Universal
- Producers: Cedric Thornton; Deric "D-Dot" Angelettie; DJ Parlay; Ike Lee III; Michael Jeter; Nashiem Myrick; Ron "Amen-Ra" Lawrence; Tracey Lee; William "Pirate" Darden

Tracey Lee chronology
Many Facez (1997)	Live From the 215 (2000)

Singles from Many Facez
- 1. "The Theme (It's Party Time)" Released: 1997

Professional ratings
Review scores
Source	Rating
AllMusic	4/5 stars
RapReviews	7/10

Many Facez is the debut studio album by American rapper Tracey Lee. It was released on March 25, 1997, via Universal Records. The album was produced by Lee, Deric "D-Dot" Angelettie, DJ Parlay, Ron "Amen-Ra" Lawrence, William "Pirate" Darden, Cedric Thornton, Ike Lee III, Michael Jeter, and Nashiem Myrick. It features guest appearances from Busta Rhymes, Erika Kaine, the Notorious B.I.G., One Step Beyond, and the Reepz. The album peaked at number 111 on the Billboard 200, while its lead single "The Theme (It's Party Time)" reached number 55 on the Billboard Hot 100 in the United States.

== Track listing ==
No.	Title	Writer(s)	Producer(s)	Length
1.	"Intro: T.R.A.C.E.Y. L.E.E."	Tracey Lee	Deric "D-Dot" Angelettie	1:06
2.	"Many Facez"	Lee; Cedric Thornton; Berthold Heinrich Kämpfert	Cedric Thornton	4:38
3.	"The Theme (It's Party Time)"	Lee; Deric Angelettie; Ronald Lawrence; Cedric A. Napoleon; Curtis Harmon; James Keith Lloyd	Deric "D-Dot" Angelettie; Ron "Amen-Ra" Lawrence; Mark Pitts (co.)	4:32
4.	"Big Will"	Lee; Angelettie; Lawrence	Deric "D-Dot" Angelettie; Ron "Amen-Ra" Lawrence	4:40
5.	"Stars in the East" (featuring One Step Beyond)	Lee; Amiri Baraka; Michael Jeter; Cynthia Biggs; Dexter Wansel	Michael Jeter	5:07
6.	"Interlude: What Was Good About Good Times"			1:00
7.	"On the Edge"	Lee; Leon Perry; The Isley Brothers; Chris Jasper	DJ Parlay; Tracey Lee	4:56
8.	"Rugged One"	Lee; Perry; Angela Winbush; René Moore	DJ Parlay; Tracey Lee	4:30
9.	"Interlude: Who's Crew"			0:58
10.	"Who's Crew"	Lee; Perry; Andre Fischer; Bobby Watson; David Wolinski; Yvette Stevens	DJ Parlay; Tracey Lee	4:18
11.	"Repent"	Lee; William Darden; Erick Sermon; Parrish Smith; George Clinton; Maurice Jarre; Ronald Dean Banks; Edward Anthony Green	William "Pirate" Darden	4:13
12.	"Give It Up Baby" (featuring Erika Kaine)	Lee; Calsar Chandler; Perry; Michael Henderson; Ray Parker Jr.	DJ Parlay; Tracey Lee	4:29
13.	"Interlude: Airport"			1:29
14.	"Keep Your Hands High" (featuring the Notorious B.I.G.)	Lee; Christopher Wallace; Ike Lee III; Kenneth Gamble; Roland Chambers; Thom Bell	Ike Lee III	4:56
15.	"The Professionals" (featuring the Reepz)	Lee; Kaseim Astwood; Kweli Davis; Darden	William "Pirate" Darden	7:18
16.	"The After Party (The Theme II)" (featuring Busta Rhymes and Pirate)	Lee; Trevor Smith; Darden; Napoleon; Harmon; Lloyd	Nashiem Myrick	4:25
17.	"Clue (Who Shot LR?)"	Lee; Angelettie; Lawrence	Deric "D-Dot" Angelettie; Ron "Amen-Ra" Lawrence	4:40
Total length:				1:07:15

== Charts ==
Chart	Peak position
US Billboard 200	111
US Top R&B/Hip-Hop Albums (Billboard)	23
US Heatseekers Albums (Billboard)	2
