= Allure (album) =

Studio album by Allure
- Released: May 6, 1997
- Genre: R&B
- Length: 51:24
- Label: Crave
- Producer: Walter Afanasieff; Darrell "Delite" Allamby; Mariah Carey; Gordon Chambers; George Pearson; Poke & Tone; Timothy "Tyme" Riley; Cory Rooney

Allure chronology
| Allure (1997) | Sunny Days (2001) |

Singles from Allure
- 1. "Head over Heels" Released: February 25, 1997; 2. "No Question" Released: 1997; 3. "All Cried Out" Released: August 12, 1997; 4. "Last Chance" Released: 1998

Allure is the debut studio album by American girl group Allure. It was released by Crave Records on May 6, 1997 in the United States.

== Critical reception ==
Professional ratings
Review scores
| Source | Rating |
|---|---|
| Allmusic | 3/5 stars |

Allmusic senior editor Stephen Thomas Erlewine found that executive producer Mariah "Carey's clout certainly helped Allure to line up celebrity collaborators [...] but it also meant that the album would be scrutinized in detail, which is unfair to any new vocal group. Allure do acquit themselves well on their debut, singing with passion and flair – it's clear they have talent. They are somewhat undone by inconsistent material, yet there are several instances where they make a song their own, and that's what makes Allure a promising debut."

== Track listing ==
| No. | Title | Writer(s) | Producer(s) | Length |
|---|---|---|---|---|
| 1. | "Introduction" (featuring Nature) | Samuel Barnes; Jermaine Baxter; Benny Latimore; Rich Nice; Jean-Claude Oliver | Poke & Tone | 1:45 |
| 2. | "Anything You Want" | Barnes; Oliver; Terri Robinson | Poke & Tone | 3:12 |
| 3. | "You're Gonna Love Me" | Burt Bacharach; Barnes; Oliver; Mary J. Blige; Latonya J. Blige; Hal David; George Pearson | Poke & Tone; Pearson^{[b]} | 4:10 |
| 4. | "Head over Heels" (featuring Nas) | Barnes; Oliver; Mariah Carey; Nasir Jones; Shawn Moltke; Marlon Williams | Poke & Tone; Carey | 4:11 |
| 5. | "No Question" (featuring LL Cool J) | Barnes; Oliver; James Mtume; Timothy Riley; Robinson; James Todd Smith | Poke & Tone; Riley | 3:45 |
| 6. | "All Cried Out" (duet with 112) | Curt Bedeau; Gerry Charles; Hugh L Clarke; Brian George; Lucien George; Paul George | Rooney; Afanasieff; Carey | 4:35 |
| 7. | "The Story" | Dave Atkinson; Barnes; Gordon Chambers; Oliver | Poke & Tone | 4:21 |
| 8. | "Come into My House" (Interlude) | Allure; Barnes; Oliver; Riley | Poke & Tone | 1:07 |
| 9. | "When You Need Someone" | Barnes; M. Blige; L. Blige; Oliver; Pearson | Poke & Tone; Pearson^{[b]} | 4:18 |
| 10. | "Give You All I Got" (featuring Raekwon) | Barnes; Oliver; Pearson; Robinson; Corey Woods | Poke & Tone; Pearson | 4:01 |
| 11. | "I'll Give You Anything" | Barnes; Oliver; Riley; Robinson | Poke & Tone; Riley | 3:16 |
| 12. | "Wanna Get With You" | Darrell "Delite" Allamby; Billy Lawrence | Allamby | 4:36 |
| 13. | "Last Chance" | Carey; Rooney | Carey; Rooney; Afanasieff^{[a]} | 4:19 |
| 14. | "Mama Said" | Chambers; Pearson | Chambers | 3:48 |

Japan bonus track
| No. | Title | Length |
|---|---|---|
| 15. | "Everytime I Think of You" | 4:09 |

Notes

- ^{^a} denotes additional producer
- ^{^b} denotes co-producer

Sample credits

- "Introduction" features a sample of "Let's Straighten it Out", as performed by Latimore.
- "Anything You Want" features a sample of "Cry Together", as performed by The O'Jays.
- "You're Gonna Love Me" features a sample of "The Look of Love" as performed by Isaac Hayes.
- "Head Over Heels" features a sample of "The Bridge" as performed by MC Shan.
- "No Question" features a sample of Juicy Fruit as performed by Mtume.
- "When You Need Someone" features a sample of "Put it on the Line" as performed by James Brown and Lyn Collins.
- "I'll Give You Anything" features a sample of "Ah Yeah" as performed by KRS-One.

== Charts ==
| Chart (1997) | Peak position |
|---|---|
| US Billboard 200 | 108 |
| US Top R&B/Hip-Hop Albums (Billboard) | 23 |

== Certifications ==
| Region | Certification | Certified units/sales |
|---|---|---|
| Canada (Music Canada) | Gold | 50,000^{^} |
| United States (RIAA) | Gold | 500,000^{^} |
^{^} Shipments figures based on certification alone.
