= This Time It's Personal (Somethin' for the People album) =

Studio album by Somethin' for the People
- Released: September 23, 1997
- Length: 68:07
- Label: Warner Bros.
- Producer: Somethin' for the People; Alison Ball-Gabriel; Byron Phillips; Michael Traylor (exec.)

Somethin' for the People chronology
Somethin' for the People (1995)	This Time It's Personal (1997)	Issues (2000)

Singles from This Time It's Personal
- 1. "My Love Is the Shhh!" Released: August 12, 1997; 2. "Think of You" Released: 1997; 3. "All I Do" Released: February 3, 1998

This Time It's Personal is the second studio album by American R&B group Somethin' for the People, released September 23, 1997 via Warner Bros. Records. Co-produced and primarily written by the group, it was their first album to chart on the Billboard 200, peaking at number 154. The album also reached number 33 on Billboard's R&B chart.

Three singles were released from the album: "My Love Is the Shhh!", "Think of You" and "All I Do". "My Love Is the Shhh!" was the group's only hit on the Billboard Hot 100, peaking at number four in 1997. In addition to original songs, the album contains a cover of "She's Always in My Hair" by Prince.

== Critical reception ==
Professional ratings
Review scores
Source	Rating
AllMusic	3/5 stars

AllMusic editor Leo Stanley rated the album three ouf of five stars. He felt that This Time It's Personal finds "the West Coast trio expanding their sound, creating a sexy blend of hip-hop and contemporary soul. Despite their attempts to make the music personal, the album offers more surface pleasures than substance, but their sound is often alluring enough to make such problems minor."

== Track listing ==
This Time It's Personal track listing
No.	Title	Writer(s)	Producer(s)	Length
1.	"This Time It's Personal" (Intro)	Les Butler; Rochad Holiday	Butler; Holiday	1:23
2.	"All I Do"	Holiday; Jeff Young; Arvel McClinton III	Somethin' for the People; McClinton	5:04
3.	"Days Like This"	Young; Arvel McClinton III	Somethin' for the People; McClinton	4:33
4.	"My Love Is the Shhh!" (featuring Trina & Tamara)	Somethin' for the People; Tamara Powell; James Baker; Melvin Young	Somethin' for the People	5:08
5.	"Take It or Leave It"	Wilson; Young	Somethin' for the People	4:42
6.	"Act Like You Want It" (featuring Eric Benét)	Wilson; McClinton III; Keith Crouch; Angela Slates	Somethin' for the People; McClinton	4:49
7.	"Feel So Good" (featuring Puff Johnson)	Wilson; Young; McClinton	Somethin' for the People; McClinton	4:11
8.	"What in the World?"	Wilson; Young; Slates	Somethin' for the People	5:01
9.	"Somebody's Always Talkin'" (featuring Trina & Tamara)	Wilson; Young; Katrina Powell; Crouch; Glenn McKinney; Slates	Somethin' for the People	5:03
10.	"I Got Love" (featuring DJ Kool)	Somethin' for the People; Suzanne Vega; Odis Wilson	Somethin' for the People	5:14
11.	"She's Always in My Hair"	Prince Nelson	Somethin' for the People	4:38
12.	"I Don't Get Down Like That"	Wilson; Young; McClinton	Somethin' for the People	4:19
13.	"Playin' the Field"	Somethin' for the People	Somethin' for the People	4:37
14.	"Think of You"	Young; Marlon McClain	Somethin' for the People	4:54
15.	"My Love Is the Shhh!" (Remix, featuring Trina & Tamara)	Somethin' for the People; T. Powell; Brenda Gordon; Brian Russell	Wilson	4:33
16.	"Outro"	Butler; Holiday	Butler; Holiday	1:12
Total length:				68:07

Sample credits

- "My Love is the Shhh!" contains a sample of "It's Been a Long Time" as performed by The New Birth.
- "I Got Love" contains samples of "Tom's Diner" as performed by Suzanne Vega; and "Flipmode Squad Meets Def Squad" as performed by Busta Rhymes, Jamal, Redman, Keith Murray, Rampage and Lord Have Mercy.

== Charts ==
Weekly chart performance for This Time It's Personal
Chart (1997)	Peak position
Dutch Albums (Album Top 100)	51
US Billboard 200	154
US Top R&B/Hip-Hop Albums (Billboard)	33

== Release history ==
This Time It's Personal release history
Region	Date	Format(s)	Label	Ref.
United States	September 23, 1997	CD; cassette	Warner Bros. Records	
