= Dru Hill (album) =

Studio album by Dru Hill
- Released: November 19, 1996
- Genre: R&B
- Length: 59:29
- Label: Island
- Producers: Hiriam Hicks (exec.), Andre Bell, Stanley Brown, Terence Dudley, A. Haqq Islam, Hitman, Benjamin Love, Nokio the N-Tity, Darryl Pearson, Daryl Simmons, Allen "Grip" Smith, Keith Sweat, Tim Dawg, Janice Upchurch

Dru Hill chronology
| Dru Hill (1996) | Enter the Dru (1998) |

Singles from Dru Hill
- 1. "Tell Me" Released: August 20, 1996; 2. "In My Bed" Released: December 17, 1996; 3. "Never Make a Promise" Released: July 28, 1997; 4. "5 Steps" Released: December 2, 1997

Dru Hill is the debut studio album from American boy band Dru Hill, released November 19, 1996, on Island Records. The album featured four singles "Tell Me", "In My Bed", "Never Make A Promise" and "5 Steps". All of the singles had music videos released. The album also features the So So Def remix of "In My Bed", which features Jermaine Dupri and Da Brat, as a bonus track, which also had a music video released.

The album peaked at number twenty-three on the Billboard 200 chart. By June 1997 it was certified platinum in sales by the RIAA, after sales exceeding 1,000,000 copies in the United States.

== Overview ==
All of the songs on the album are performed by Sisqó, Nokio, Jazz and Woody. Sisqó sings solo on the tracks "In My Bed", "Love's Train" and "Share My World", Jazz sings solo on "Never Make A Promise" and Woody sings solo on "April Showers". Nokio has no solos and is featured on "Satisfied" & "All Alone" which all of the members perform on both.

== Release and reception ==
Professional ratings
Review scores
| Source | Rating |
|---|---|
| AllMusic | 4/5 stars |
| Robert Christgau | (dud) |
| Muzik | 8/10 |
| The Rolling Stone Album Guide | 3/5 stars |
| USA Today | 2.5/4 stars |
| Vibe | (favourable) |

The album peaked at twenty-three on the U.S. Billboard 200 and reached the fifth spot on the R&B Albums chart. The album was certified gold in February 1997 and platinum by June of the same year. Rob Theakston of AllMusic called the album "an impressive debut and a razor-sharp clue of the great things to come."

== Track listing ==
| No. | Title | Writer(s) | Producer(s) | Length |
|---|---|---|---|---|
| 1. | "Anthem" | Janice Upchurch; Andre Bell | Stanley Brown, Janice Upchurch, Andre Bell | 1:00 |
| 2. | "Nothing To Prove" | Tim Patterson; Terence Dudley; F. Rovira; M. Ellis | Tim Dawg, Terence Dudley | 4:06 |
| 3. | "Tell Me" | Stanley Brown; Myron; Alex Cantrall | Stanley Brown, Benjamin Love | 4:13 |
| 4. | "Do U Believe?" | Tim Patterson; Terence Dudley | Tim Dawg, Terence Dudley | 4:12 |
| 5. | "Whatever U Want" | Stanley Brown; Mark Andrews; Larry Anthony; Myron; Saeida Hall | Stanley Brown | 3:58 |
| 6. | "Satisfied" | Nate "Phenomenal" Clemons; Tamir Ruffin; Mark Andrews; James Green | The Clemons Brothers, Nokio the N-Tity | 4:44 |
| 7. | "April Showers" | James Green; Larry Anthony; Tamir Ruffin | A. Haqq Islam, Nokio The N-Tity | 3:34 |
| 8. | "All Alone" | Tamir Ruffin; James Green; Mark Andrews; Larry Anthony; Gregory Jones | A. Haqq Islam, Nokio The N-Tity | 3:35 |
| 9. | "Never Make a Promise" | Daryl Simmons | Daryl Simmons | 5:27 |
| 10. | "So Special" | Tamir Ruffin; Darryl Pearson; James Green; Larry Anthony; Mark Andrews | Darryl Pearson, A. Haqq Islam, Nokio The N-Tity | 5:24 |
| 11. | "In My Bed" | Raphael Brown; Ralph Stacy; Daryl Simmons | Daryl Simmons | 4:45 |
| 12. | "Love's Train" | Michael Cooper; Felton Pilate | Keith Sweat, Allen Smith | 4:20 |
| 13. | "Share My World" | Keith Sweat; Bobby Crawford; Jerome Lane | Keith Sweat | 4:28 |
| 14. | "5 Steps" | Tamir Ruffin; James Green; Wendi Miller | Stanley Brown, Nokio The N-Tity | 5:43 |
| 15. | "In My Bed (So So Def Mix) [EU Bonus Track]" (featuring Jermaine Dupri & Da Brat) | | Jermaine Dupri | 4:02 |
| 16. | "Tell Me (Bounce Version) [JP Bonus Track]" (featuring Big Dex) | | Stanley Brown & Benjamin Love | 4:16 |
| 17. | "This Christmas [JP Bonus Track]" | | Stanley Brown | 4:12 |

== Charts ==
=== Weekly charts ===
| Chart (1996–1998) | Peak position |
|---|---|
| German Albums (Offizielle Top 100) | 33 |
| US Billboard 200 | 23 |
| US Heatseekers Albums (Billboard) | 2 |
| US Top R&B/Hip-Hop Albums (Billboard) | 5 |

=== Year-end charts ===
| Chart (1997) | Position |
|---|---|
| US Billboard 200 | 60 |
| US Top R&B/Hip-Hop Albums (Billboard) | 16 |
| Chart (1998) | Position |
| US Top R&B/Hip-Hop Albums (Billboard) | 78 |

== Certifications ==
| Region | Certification | Certified units/sales |
|---|---|---|
| United States (RIAA) | Platinum | 1,000,000^{^} |
^{^} Shipments figures based on certification alone.

== Personnel ==
- assistant engineering – Jim Carliana, Chris Habeck, Kevin Lively, Steven Rhodes, Brian Thomas, Bernasky Wall, Won B., Luke Yeager
- assistant mixing – Steve Jones, Mike Rew, Gordon Rice, Paul Smith
- associate production – A. Haqq Islam, Ralph Stacy
- bass – Ronnie Garrett, Lance Hiesman, Zachary Scott, Nate Clemons
- drum programming – Michael Aharon, Big Mike Clemons, Daryl Simmons, Allen "Grip" Smith
- drums – Nathaniel Townsley
- engineering – Won Allen, Mike Anzel, Brian Frye, Larry Gold, Karl Heilbron, David Kennedy, Thom "TK" Kidd, Chris Lighty, Alex Nesmith, Jon Smeltz, Mike Tarsia
- executive production – Hiriam Hicks, Haqq Islam, Kevin Peck
- grooming – William Marshall
- guitar – Fred Campbell
- keyboard programming – Bobby Crawford, Allen "Grip" Smith
- keyboards – Stanley Brown, Kim Jordan, Benjamin Love, Daryl Simmons, Allen "Grip" Smith
- mastering – Chris Gehringer
- mixing – John Anthony, Chris Barnett, Russell Elevado, Jon Gass, Gerhard Joost, Darryl Pearson, Mike Tarsia
- multi-instruments – Nate "Phenomenal" Clemons, Ralph Stacy
- overdubs – Anthony Duino, Russell Elevado
- percussion – Spike
- photography – Guzman (Constance Hansen & Russell Peacock)
- production – Andre Bell, Stanley Brown, Terence Dudley, A. Haqq Islam, Benjamin Love, Nokio the N-Tity, Tim Dawg, Darryl Pearson, Daryl Simmons, Allen "Grip" Smith, Keith Sweat, Janice Upchurch
- production coordination – Ivy Skoff
- programming – Tom Salta
- rapping – Triip
- string arranging – Michael Aharon
- stylist – Nadia Bartos
- vocal arranging – Darryl Pearson, Sisqó
- vocals (background) – James "Woody" Green
