= Do You Like This =

1997 single by Rome

Single by Rome

from the album Rome
- Released: July 14, 1997
- Recorded: 1996
- Genre: R&B
- Length: 4:54 (album version); 4:08 (single edit)
- Label: RCA
- Songwriters: Jerome Woods; Gerald Baillergeau
- Producers: Gerald Baillergeau; Victor Merritt

Rome singles chronology
"I Belong to You (Every Time I See Your Face)" (1997)	"Do You Like This" (1997)	"Crazy Love" (1997)

Music video
- "Do You Like This" on YouTube

"Do You Like This" is a song co-written and performed by American contemporary R&B singer Rome, issued as the second single from his eponymous debut album. It was his last song to chart on the Billboard Hot 100, peaking at #31 in 1997.

== Music video ==
The official music video for the song was directed by Brian Luvar.

== Charts ==
=== Weekly charts ===
Chart (1997)	Peak position
US Billboard Hot 100	31
US Hot R&B/Hip-Hop Songs (Billboard)	10

=== Year-end charts ===
Chart (1997)	Position
US Hot R&B/Hip-Hop Songs (Billboard)	59
