= Tell Me (Dru Hill song) =

Single by Dru Hill

from the album Dru Hill and Eddie (soundtrack)
- Released: July 30, 1996
- Genre: R&B
- Length: 4:13
- Label: Island
- Songwriters: Stanley Brown, Myron A. Cantrall
- Producer: Stanley Brown

Dru Hill singles chronology
"Tell Me" (1996)	"In My Bed" (1997)

Music video
- "Tell Me" on YouTube

"Tell Me" is the debut single by American R&B boy band Dru Hill. In the US, the song peaked at numbers 18 and 20 on the Billboard Hot 100 and Cash Box Top 100, and number five on the Billboard R&B chart. It sold 600,000 copies domestically, earning a gold certification from the RIAA. It reached number 30 on the UK Singles Chart. The song is also the first single from the group's eponymous debut album.

The song first appeared on the soundtrack of the 1996 film, Eddie. The music video was filmed in September and premiered on T.V. two months later.

The group also performed the song while guest-starring in the third-season premiere of the American sitcom Moesha aired in August 1997, as well as a fourth-season episode of another sitcom, The Parent 'Hood, aired in November 1997, in which they sang acapella and during its closing credits.

== Music video ==
The music video, directed by Terry Heller, features the group performing the song in a club.

== Track listing ==
US CD single
No.	Title	Length
1.	"Tell Me"	4:13
2.	"Tell Me (Acappella)"	3:58
3.	"Tell Me (Executive Mix)"	4:12

US 12" vinyl promo
No.	Title	Length
1.	"Tell Me"	4:13
2.	"Tell Me (Acappella)"	3:58
3.	"Tell Me (Instrumental)"	4:13
4.	"Tell Me Tell Me (Executive Mix)"	4:12

== Charts ==
=== Weekly charts ===
Chart (1996–1997)	Peak position
Scottish Singles Sales (Official Charts)	80
UK Singles (Official Charts)	30
UK Dance (Official Charts)	15
UK Hip Hop/R&B (Official Charts)	5
US Billboard Hot 100	18
US Hot R&B/Hip-Hop Songs (Billboard)	5
US Rhythmic Airplay (Billboard)	20
US Cash Box Top 100	20

=== Year-end charts ===
Chart (1996)	Position
US Hot R&B/Hip-Hop Songs (Billboard)	33

Chart (1997)	Position
US Hot R&B/Hip-Hop Songs (Billboard)	63

== Certifications ==
Region	Certification	Certified units/sales
United States (RIAA)	Gold	500,000^{^}
^{^} Shipments figures based on certification alone.
