= Crave Records =

- Founded: 1997
- Founder: Mariah Carey
- Country of origin: United States

Crave Records was a record label founded by Mariah Carey in February 1997, as an imprint of Sony Music Entertainment. It was shut down in July of the following year. The name "Crave" originates from "Demented", a song Carey wrote for the 1995 alternative rock album Someone's Ugly Daughter. This was kept a secret until it was revealed in her 2020 memoir The Meaning of Mariah Carey.

Acts signed to the label included DJ Company, female R&B quartet Allure, who released a self-titled album in 1997 featuring the hit singles "Head Over Heels", "All Cried Out", and "Last Chance", as well as male R&B quartet 7 Mile, who released a self-titled album in 1998.

== Artists ==
- DJ Company
- Allure
- 7 Mile

== See also ==
- List of record labels
