= The Theme (It's Party Time) =

Single by Tracey Lee

from the album Many Facez
- B-side: "We Getz Busy"
- Released: February 4, 1997
- Recorded: 1996
- Genre: Hip hop
- Length: 4:32
- Label: Universal
- Songwriter(s): Tracey Lee
- Producer(s): D-Dot; Ron "Amen-Ra" Lawrence

"The Theme (It's Party Time)" is the lead single released from Tracey Lee's debut album, Many Facez. The song was produced by D-Dot, Ron "Amen-Ra" Lawrence and was a mild success, making it to 4 different Billboard charts, including 55 on the Billboard Hot 100.

The official remix, entitled "The After Party (The Theme II)" featured rappers, Busta Rhymes and Pirate and was also featured on the Many Facez album and was given both a single release and a music video. An additional remix was also released featuring Rampage.

== Single track listing ==
1. "The Theme (It's Party Time)" (Radio Edit)- 3:57
2. "The Theme (It's Party Time)" (Party Edit)- 4:00
3. "The Theme (It's Party Time)" (Album Version)- 4:37
4. "The Theme (It's Party Time)" (Acappella)- 4:39
5. "The Theme (It's Party Time)" (Instrumental)- 4:25

== Charts ==
Chart (1997)	Peak position
Billboard Hot 100	55
Billboard Hot R&B/Hip-Hop Singles & Tracks	19
Billboard Hot Rap Singles	6
Billboard Hot Dance Music/Maxi-Singles Sales	3
