= Tracey Lee =

American rapper

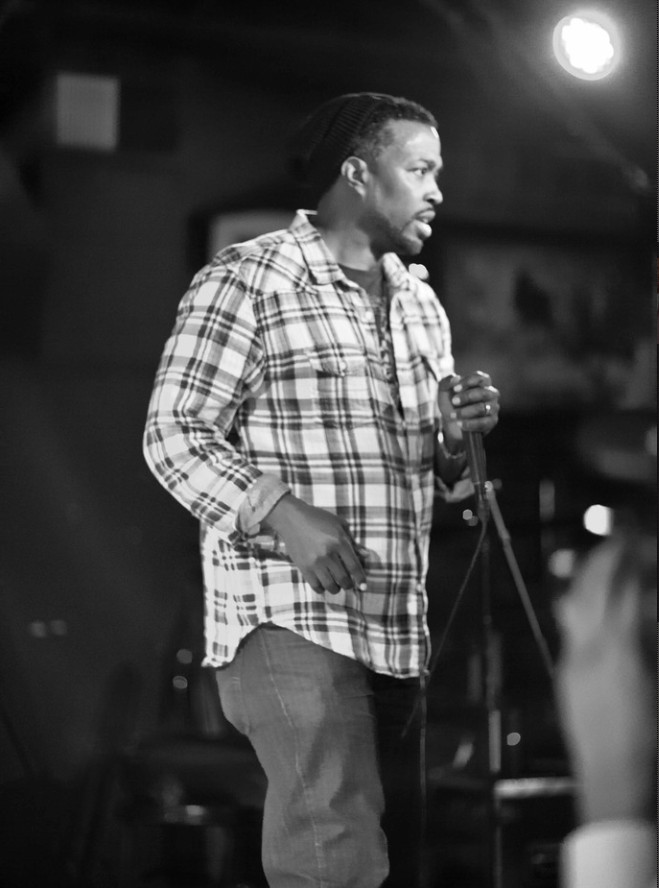
- Lee performing in Washington, DC 2015

Background information
- Born: Tracey Lee; October 22, 1970 (age 55); Buffalo, New York, United States
- Origin: Philadelphia, Pennsylvania
- Genres: Hip Hop
- Occupations: Rapper, Lawyer, Music Producer
- Years active: 1986–present
- Labels: Universal Records, LLeft Entertainment
- Website: www.traceyleemusic.com

Tracey Lee (born October 22, 1970) is an American Hip-Hop artist and entertainment lawyer. He became known in 1997 when his single "The Theme (It's Party Time)", which settled on Billboard’s Top 100 for thirty-seven weeks became an overnight hit. His debut album Many Facez followed on April 8, 1997. As a rising star in hip-hop, Tracey Lee also had the opportunity to collaborate with award-winning artists such as Busta Rhymes, Kanye West and The Notorious B.I.G., with whom he released "Keep Your Hands High". Lee also made a guest appearance on Changing Faces' "Goin' Nowhere", a song from the album All Day, All Night. Lee appeared on national television shows such as BET Rap City: The Basement, BET Teen Summit, The Keenen Ivory Wayans Show, and HBO Original Series: Arliss. Lee released his album ESQ: The Revelation in October 2014 on his independent label LLeft Entertainment with distribution from TuneCore. He has since released two additional independent projects, Expect The Unexpected (2019) and Glory (2020). In Fall of 2016 Lee joined the faculty staff of Coppin State University as an adjunct professor teaching The Business of Music course.

Lee is a graduate of Howard University, receiving an undergraduate degree in Communication and a Juris Doctor degree from Southern University Law Center. Some of his legal clients have included: Grammy-nominated artist Eric Roberson, Invisible Productions (for Kelly Rowland, Solange Knowles and Kobe Bryant) and DJ Young Guru (tour DJ & Engineer for Jay-Z).

== Discography ==
=== Albums ===
Year	Title	Chart positions	
Year	Title	U.S. Billboard 200	U.S. R&B
1997	Many Facez: Released: April 8, 1997; Label: ByStorm, Universal	111	23
2000	Live From The (215): Released: 2000; Label: ByStorm, Universal		
2014	Esq: The Revelation: Released: September 2014; Label: LLeft Entertainment, TuneCore		
2019	Expect The Unexpected: Released: September 2019; Label: LLeft Entertainment, TuneCore		
2020	Glory: Released: July 2020; Label: LLeft Entertainment, TuneCore		

=== Singles ===
Year	Song	Chart positions			
Year	Song	Billboard Hot 100	Hot R&B/Hip-Hop Songs	Hot Rap Tracks	UK Singles Chart
1997	"The Theme (It's Party Time)"	#55	#19	#6	#51
