= Never Make a Promise =

"Never Make A Promise"

Single by Dru Hill

from the album Dru Hill
- Released: July 28, 1997
- Recorded: 1996
- Genre: R&B
- Length: 5:27
- Label: Island
- Songwriter(s): Daryl Simmons
- Producer(s): Daryl Simmons

Dru Hill singles chronology
"In My Bed" (1997)	"Never Make A Promise" (1997)	"5 Steps" (1997)

Music video
- "Never Make A Promise" on YouTube

"Never Make A Promise" is a number-one R&B song by group Dru Hill, released in 1997. It is the third single from their eponymous debut album. With a lead by Larry "Jazz" Anthony, the single spent four weeks at number one on the US R&B chart and peaked at number seven on the US pop chart. Although it was a hit, sales of the "Never Make A Promise" single were mainly driven by the popular So So Def Remix of their previous hit "In My Bed" only being available on its B-side.

== Music video ==
The music video was directed by Frank Sacramento. The music video features an appearance by actress Michelle Thomas, who plays Jazz's girlfriend. She tells Jazz that she is pregnant and he gets excited; but she also has a drunk father who rapes her but she is too scared to tell anyone.

== Track listing ==
US CD single
No.	Title	Length
1.	"Never Make A Promise (Radio Edit)"	4:06
2.	"In My Bed (So So Def Mix)"	4:02
3.	"Never Make A Promise (Hex Hector Radio Edit)"	4:33

== Personnel ==
Credits adapted from liner notes.

- Mark "Sisqo" Andrews, James "Woody" Green, Tamir "Nokio" Ruffin and Larry "Jazz" Anthony : lead and background vocals
- Daryl Simmons : writer, composer, producer, keyboards and drum programming
- Ronnie Garrett : bass
- Thom "TK" Kidd : engineer
- Jon Gass : mixing engineer
- Kevin Lively : assistant engineer
- Ivy Skoff : production coordinator

== Charts and certifications ==
=== Weekly charts ===
Chart (1997)	Peak position
US Billboard Hot 100	7
US Dance Singles Sales (Billboard)	3
US Hot R&B/Hip-Hop Songs (Billboard)	1
US Rhythmic (Billboard)	23

=== Year-end charts ===
Chart (1997)	Position
US Billboard Hot 100	56
US Hot R&B/Hip-Hop Songs (Billboard)	11

=== Certifications ===
Region	Certification	Certified units/sales
United States (RIAA)	Gold	700,000

== See also ==
- List of number-one R&B singles of 1997 (U.S.)
