= My Love Is the Shhh! =

1997 single by Somethin' for the People

Single by Somethin' for the People featuring Trina & Tamara

from the album This Time It's Personal
- Released: August 12, 1997
- Genre: R&B
- Length: 5:08 (album version); 4:19 (single edit)
- Label: Warner Bros.
- Songwriters: Curtis "Sauce" Wilson; Roshad Holiday; Jeff "Fuzzy" Young; Tamara Powell; James Baker; Melvin Young
- Producer: Somethin' for the People

Somethin' for the People singles chronology
"With You" (1996)	"My Love Is the Shhh!" (1997)	"Think of You" (1997)

Trina & Tamara singles chronology
"My Love Is the Shhh!" (1997)	"What'd You Come Here For?" (1998)

"My Love Is the Shhh!" is a song co-written, produced, and performed by American R&B group Somethin' for the People, issued as the lead single from their second studio album, This Time It's Personal (1997). It features vocals from fellow contemporary R&B group Trina & Tamara. The song samples "It's Been a Long Time" by the New Birth, and it was the group's only hit on the US Billboard Hot 100 chart, peaking at number four in 1997. Worldwide, it became a top-10 hit in Canada, the Netherlands, and New Zealand. The single was certified platinum by the Recording Industry Association of America (RIAA) on December 17, 1997.

== Music video ==
The official music video for the song was directed by Rashidi Natara Harper.

== Charts ==
=== Weekly charts ===
Chart (1997–1998)	Peak position
Canada (Nielsen SoundScan)	7
Germany (GfK)	24
Netherlands (Dutch Top 40)	5
Netherlands (Single Top 100)	6
New Zealand (Recorded Music NZ)	8
Sweden (Sverigetopplistan)	52
UK Singles (OCC)	66
US Billboard Hot 100	4
US Hot R&B Singles (Billboard)	2
US Maxi-Singles Sales (Billboard)	22
US Rhythmic Top 40 (Billboard)	1
US Top 40/Mainstream (Billboard)	27

=== Year-end charts ===
Chart (1997)	Position
US Billboard Hot 100	51
US Hot R&B Singles (Billboard)	17
US Rhythmic Top 40 (Billboard)	44

Chart (1998)	Position
Netherlands (Dutch Top 40)	66
Netherlands (Single Top 100)	55
New Zealand (RIANZ)	44
US Billboard Hot 100	54
US Hot R&B Singles (Billboard)	47
US Mainstream Top 40 (Billboard)	89
US Rhythmic Top 40 (Billboard)	21

== Certifications ==
Region	Certification	Certified units/sales
United States (RIAA)	Platinum	1,000,000^{^}
^{^} Shipments figures based on certification alone.

== Release history ==
Region	Date	Format(s)	Label(s)	Ref.
United States	August 12, 1997	—N/a	Warner Bros.	
United States	October 14, 1996	Contemporary hit radio	Warner Bros.	
United Kingdom	January 26, 1998	CD	Warner Bros.	
