= Trina & Tamara =

American contemporary R&B group

- Origin: Gary, Indiana, U.S.
- Genres: R&B
- Years active: 1990s
- Label: Columbia
- Past members: Trina Powell; Tamara Powell

Trina & Tamara are an American R&B duo from Gary, Indiana, who were active in the late 1990s. The group was composed of sisters Trina Powell (born April 18, 1974) and Tamara Powell. They are the younger sisters of fellow contemporary R&B singer Jesse Powell. In 1997, the duo appeared on the song "My Love Is the Shhh!" by Somethin' for the People, which peaked at number 4 on the Billboard Hot 100. Their next single, "What'd You Come Here For?" was released in 1999. It peaked at number 14 on the Billboard R&B chart, and number 56 on the Hot 100. Their album, the eponymous Trina & Tamara, was released shortly after and peaked at number 99 on the Billboard R&B albums chart.

In 2016, the sisters announced they were working on an autobiographical book titled The Sisterfriend Journey, which is based on their relationship (and many years of fallout) as sisters, songwriters, and women. It was released on March 15, 2017.

== Discography ==
=== Albums ===
Title	Album details	Peak chart positions
Title	Album details	U.S. R&B
Trina & Tamara	Released: May 11, 1999; Label: C2/Columbia; Formats: LP, CD	99

=== Singles ===
Year	Song	Peak chart positions		Album
Year	Song	U.S. Hot 100	U.S. R&B	Album
1998	"What'd You Come Here For?"	56	14	Trina & Tamara

==== As featured artist ====
Year	Song	Peak chart positions				Album
Year	Song	U.S. Hot 100	U.S. R&B	U.S. Pop	U.K.	Album
1997	"My Love Is the Shhh!" (Somethin' for the People featuring Trina & Tamara)	4	2	27	64	This Time It's Personal

== Bibliography ==
- The Sisterfriend Journey (2017)
