= I Belong to You (Every Time I See Your Face) =

1997 single by Rome

Single by Rome

from the album Rome
- B-side: "Real Joy", "Heaven"
- Released: 1997
- Recorded: 1996
- Genre: R&B
- Length: 4:33 (album version); 3:59 (single edit)
- Label: RCA
- Songwriters: Jerome Woods; Gerald Baillergeau
- Producers: Gerald Baillergeau; Victor Merritt

Rome singles chronology
"I Belong to You (Every Time I See Your Face)" (1997)	"Do You Like This" (1997)

Music video
- "I Belong to You (Every Time I See Your Face)" on YouTube

"I Belong to You (Every Time I See Your Face)" is a song co-written and performed by American contemporary R&B singer Rome. It is the opening track on his eponymous debut album and was issued as the album's first single. The song is Rome's biggest hit to date on the Billboard Hot 100, peaking at #6 in 1997.

The single was certified platinum by the RIAA on June 11, 1997, and sold 1.3 million copies.

== Music video ==
The official music video for the song was directed by Chris Erskin.

== Chart positions ==
=== Weekly charts ===
Chart (1997)	Peak position
US Billboard Hot 100	6
US Hot R&B/Hip-Hop Songs (Billboard)	2
US Rhythmic (Billboard)	2

=== Year-end charts ===
Chart (1997)	Position
US Billboard Hot 100	24
US Hot R&B/Hip-Hop Songs (Billboard)	6
