= Rome (R&B singer) =

- Born: Jerome Woods; March 5, 1970 (age 56); Benton Harbor, Michigan, U.S.
- Genres: R&B
- Years active: 1996–2003, 2009–present
- Labels: RCA (1996–1999); JTJ (2001–2003); Suthun Music Entertainment (2009–present)

Jerome Woods (born March 5, 1970, in Benton Harbor, Michigan), better known by his stage name Rome, is an American R&B singer. He is best known for his 1997 single "I Belong to You (Every Time I See Your Face)", which peaked within the top ten of the Billboard Hot 100. The song led his eponymous debut studio album (1997), which moderately entered the Billboard 200.

== Career ==
Woods performed in a cover band called Fire & Ice in high school, and toured regionally both as a solo artist and with the band. He briefly attended Oakwood University before dropping out in 1989; he moved to California in hopes of making a career as a singer. He toured with Vesta but had little success until he met with Gerald Baillergeau and Victor Merrit, the producers who heard his demo and sent it to RCA Records. RCA signed him and released his eponymous debut album in 1997, which went on to sell over half a million copies in the U.S., mainly on the strength of its lead single "I Belong to You (Every Time I See Your Face)", which peaked at number six on the Billboard Hot 100. The follow-up single, "Do You Like This", peaked at number 31 on the Billboard Hot 100 and number 10 on the Hot R&B/Hip-Hop Songs chart, where "I Belong to You" had previously reached number two.

Having achieved success with his RCA Records debut, a projected second album was rejected. Instead, his second album, Rome2000: Thank You, was released independently, although the material recorded while under his contract with RCA remains unreleased. In 2001, he returned with two albums: To The Highest and To Infinity (Thank You); the last one is just an alternative edition of Rome2000: Thank You. Do It followed in 2003, and three years later Sony issued Rome's Best Of, which contains ten songs from his 1997 debut.

== Discography ==
=== Albums ===
Title	Album details	Peak chart positions	
Title	Album details	U.S. 200	U.S. R&B
Rome	Released: April 15, 1997; Label: RCA	30	7
To Infinity (Thank You)	Released: November 2, 1999; Label: JTJ / Big Whale	—	48
To The Highest	Released: June 19, 2001; Label: JTJ	—	—
Do It	Released: March 11, 2003; Label: JTJ	—	—
The Best Of Rome	Released: January 31, 2006; Label: Sony	—	—
My Time Again (EP)	Released: January 7, 2014; Label: Twenty Two / Fontana	—	—

=== Singles ===
Year	Song	Peak chart positions		Album
Year	Song	U.S. Hot 100	U.S. R&B	Album
1993	"My World"	—	—	Non-Album Single
1997	"I Belong to You (Every Time I See Your Face)"	6	2	Rome
1997	"Do You Like This"	31	10	Rome
1997	"Crazy Love"	—	—	Rome
1999	"Never Let You Go Away"	—	—	Non-Album Single
2001	"Ride & Roll"	—	—	To The Highest
2003	"Do It"	—	—	Do It
2009	"Back On The Scene"	—	—	Non-Album Single

=== Guest appearances and compilations ===
- SWV It's All About U cd2 1996 RCA records cds

Song: "Use Your Heart"

- SoulTrain Christmas StarFest 1997 Sony records

Song: "Have Yourself A Merry Little Christmas"

- Danesha Starr featuring ROME Interscope 1998 cds

Song "As Long As I Live"

- Sylk-E. Fyne Raw Sylk 1998 RCA records

Song: "I Missed My Loved Ones"

- Blade Original Soundtrack 1998 TVT records

Song: "Fightin' A War"

- Held Up Original Soundtrack 2000

Song: "Ride Baby"

- Bobby Brown Forever 1997 MCA records

Song: "Heart and Soul", "Give It Up"

=== Music videos ===
Year	Video	Director
1997	"I Belong to You (Every Time I See Your Face)"	Christopher Erskin
1997	"Do You Like This"	Brian Luvar
1997	"Crazy Love"	Brian Luvar
