= No Time (Lil' Kim song) =

1996 single by Lil' Kim featuring Puff Daddy

Single by Lil' Kim featuring Puff Daddy

from the album Hard Core
- Released: October 17, 1996
- Recorded: 1996
- Studio: Daddy's House Recording Studios (New York City)
- Genre: Dirty rap
- Length: 5:03
- Label: Undeas; Big Beat; Atlantic
- Songwriters: Kimberly Jones; Sean Combs; Christopher Wallace; Steven Jordan
- Producers: Steven "Stevie J" Jordan for The Hitmen; Sean "Puffy" Combs

Lil' Kim singles chronology
"No One Else (Puff Daddy Remix)" (1995)	"No Time" (1996)	"Crush on You" (1997)

Puff Daddy singles chronology
"Dolly My Baby" (1993)	"No Time" (1996)	"Can't Nobody Hold Me Down" (1996)

Music video
- "No Time" on YouTube

"No Time" is the debut single by American rapper Lil' Kim featuring Puff Daddy. It was released in October 1996 by Undeas, Big Beat and Atlantic Records, as the lead single for her debut album, Hard Core (1996). It peaked at numbers 18 and 38 on the US Billboard Hot 100 and Cash Box Top 100 charts, reached the top ten on the Hot R&B/Hip-Hop Songs, and peaked the US Rap Songs for nine weeks—becoming Kim's first number-one hit on the chart. Additionally, the song charted at number 45 on the UK Singles Chart. "No Time" was certified Gold by the Recording Industry Association of America (RIAA) and contains a sample of Vicki Anderson's "Message from the Soul Sisters" and Lyn Collins's "Take Me Just As I Am."

== Music video ==
The music video for "No Time", which was helmed by German director Marcus Nispel and filmed in the World Trade Center, features her and Puff riding up and down escalators while rapping. Kim makes reference to Adina Howard's hit single "Freak Like Me" in the song's lyrics when she says: "...your girl ain't a freak like me, or Adina". Kim makes a reference to the video in the 2003 song "(When Kim Say) Can You Hear Me Know " off the album La Bella Mafia, saying "...im the same bitch on the escalator", and also in the 2005 single Whoa when she says: "...told you I'm the same bitch from the escalator".

== Formats and track listings ==
- UK cassette single
1. "No Time" (Radio Edit) – 3:58
2. "No Time" (The Incident Remix) – 4:39
- UK CD single
1. "No Time" (Radio Edit) – 3:58
2. "No Time" (Radio Mix) – 5:03
3. "No Time" (Album Version) – 5:03
4. "No Time" (Instrumental) – 5:03
- Europe CD single
1. "No Time" (Radio Edit) – 3:58
2. "No Time" (The Incident Remix) – 4:39
3. "No Time" (Incident Remix Instrumental) – 4:38
4. "No Time" (Album Version) – 5:03
5. "No Time" (Instrumental) – 5:03

== Credits and personnel ==
- Vocals by Lil' Kim, S. Combs
- Written by K. Jones, S. Combs, J. Brown
- Produced by Sean "Puff Daddy" Combs and Steven "Stevie J" Jordan
- Mastered by Herb Powers

== Charts ==
=== Weekly charts ===
Charts (1996–1997)	Peak position
UK Singles (Official Charts)	45
UK Dance (Official Charts)	7
UK Hip Hop/R&B (Official Charts)	11
US Billboard Hot 100	18
US Dance Singles Sales (Billboard)	6
US Hot Rap Songs (Billboard)	1
US Hot R&B/Hip-Hop Songs (Billboard)	9
US Cash Box Top 100	38

=== Year-end charts ===
Chart (1996)	Position
US Hot Rap Singles (Billboard)	29

Chart (1997)	Position
US Billboard Hot 100	80
US Billboard Hot 100 Singles Sales	50
US Hot R&B Singles (Billboard)	36
US Hot R&B Singles Sales (Billboard)	22
US Hot R&B Airplay (Billboard)	73
US Hot Rap Singles (Billboard)	6

== Certifications ==
Region	Certification	Certified units/sales
United States (RIAA)	Gold	500,000^{^}
^{^} Shipments figures based on certification alone.
