= List of Billboard Hot 100 number ones of 1997 =

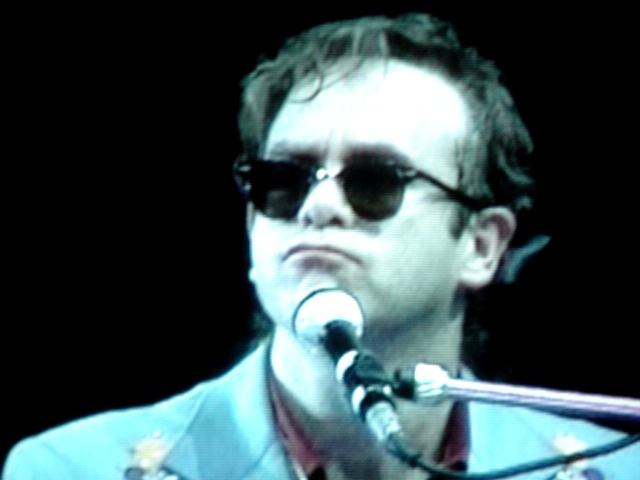
Elton John earned his latest Hot 100 number-one single with "Candle in the Wind 1997" / "Something About the Way You Look Tonight", which stayed at the top position for 12 straight weeks

The Billboard Hot 100 is a chart that ranks the best-performing singles of the United States. Published by Billboard magazine, the data are compiled by Nielsen SoundScan based collectively on each single's weekly physical sales and airplay. There were ten singles that peaked atop the charts, but if "Un-Break My Heart" is excluded from the count (for the song started its peak in the previous year), the total would be nine. The longest running number-one single of 1997 is "Candle in the Wind 1997"/"Something About the Way You Look Tonight", which logged 14 weeks at the top of the Billboard Hot 100. Two of those weeks were logged in 1998 while the remaining 12 were attained in 1997.

With "Honey" becoming her 12th #1 single, Mariah Carey broke the record for most #1 songs by a female artist, surpassing Madonna and Whitney Houston with 11 each.

That year, 7 acts earned their first number one song, such as Spice Girls, Puff Daddy, Mase, The Notorious B.I.G., Hanson, Faith Evans, and 112. The Notorious B.I.G. became the fifth artist to hit number one posthumously, after his death in March 1997. Puff Daddy, Mase, and The Notorious B.I.G. were the only artists to hit number one more than once, with Puff Daddy hitting the most with three, while Mase and The Notorious B.I.G. hit twice.

== Chart history ==
Key
†	Indicates best-performing single of 1997

No.	Issue date	Song	Artist(s)	Ref.
812	January 4	"Un-Break My Heart"	Toni Braxton	
812	January 11	"Un-Break My Heart"	Toni Braxton	
812	January 18	"Un-Break My Heart"	Toni Braxton	
812	January 25	"Un-Break My Heart"	Toni Braxton	
812	February 1	"Un-Break My Heart"	Toni Braxton	
812	February 8	"Un-Break My Heart"	Toni Braxton	
812	February 15	"Un-Break My Heart"	Toni Braxton	
813	February 22	"Wannabe"	Spice Girls	
813	March 1	"Wannabe"	Spice Girls	
813	March 8	"Wannabe"	Spice Girls	
813	March 15	"Wannabe"	Spice Girls	
814	March 22	"Can't Nobody Hold Me Down"	Puff Daddy featuring Mase	
814	March 29	"Can't Nobody Hold Me Down"	Puff Daddy featuring Mase	
814	April 5	"Can't Nobody Hold Me Down"	Puff Daddy featuring Mase	
814	April 12	"Can't Nobody Hold Me Down"	Puff Daddy featuring Mase	
814	April 19	"Can't Nobody Hold Me Down"	Puff Daddy featuring Mase	
814	April 26	"Can't Nobody Hold Me Down"	Puff Daddy featuring Mase	
815	May 3	"Hypnotize"	The Notorious B.I.G.	
815	May 10	"Hypnotize"	The Notorious B.I.G.	
815	May 17	"Hypnotize"	The Notorious B.I.G.	
816	May 24	"MMMBop"	Hanson	
816	May 31	"MMMBop"	Hanson	
816	June 7	"MMMBop"	Hanson	
817	June 14	"I'll Be Missing You"	Puff Daddy and Faith Evans featuring 112	
817	June 21	"I'll Be Missing You"	Puff Daddy and Faith Evans featuring 112	
817	June 28	"I'll Be Missing You"	Puff Daddy and Faith Evans featuring 112	
817	July 5	"I'll Be Missing You"	Puff Daddy and Faith Evans featuring 112	
817	July 12	"I'll Be Missing You"	Puff Daddy and Faith Evans featuring 112	
817	July 19	"I'll Be Missing You"	Puff Daddy and Faith Evans featuring 112	
817	July 26	"I'll Be Missing You"	Puff Daddy and Faith Evans featuring 112	
817	August 2	"I'll Be Missing You"	Puff Daddy and Faith Evans featuring 112	
817	August 9	"I'll Be Missing You"	Puff Daddy and Faith Evans featuring 112	
817	August 16	"I'll Be Missing You"	Puff Daddy and Faith Evans featuring 112	
817	August 23	"I'll Be Missing You"	Puff Daddy and Faith Evans featuring 112	
818	August 30	"Mo Money Mo Problems"	The Notorious B.I.G. featuring Puff Daddy and Mase	
818	September 6	"Mo Money Mo Problems"	The Notorious B.I.G. featuring Puff Daddy and Mase	
819	September 13	"Honey"	Mariah Carey	
819	September 20	"Honey"	Mariah Carey	
819	September 27	"Honey"	Mariah Carey	
820	October 4	"4 Seasons of Loneliness"	Boyz II Men	
821	October 11	"Candle in the Wind 1997" / "Something About the Way You Look Tonight"†	Elton John	
821	October 18	"Candle in the Wind 1997" / "Something About the Way You Look Tonight"†	Elton John	
821	October 25	"Candle in the Wind 1997" / "Something About the Way You Look Tonight"†	Elton John	
821	November 1	"Candle in the Wind 1997" / "Something About the Way You Look Tonight"†	Elton John	
821	November 8	"Candle in the Wind 1997" / "Something About the Way You Look Tonight"†	Elton John	
821	November 15	"Candle in the Wind 1997" / "Something About the Way You Look Tonight"†	Elton John	
821	November 22	"Candle in the Wind 1997" / "Something About the Way You Look Tonight"†	Elton John	
821	November 29	"Candle in the Wind 1997" / "Something About the Way You Look Tonight"†	Elton John	
821	December 6	"Candle in the Wind 1997" / "Something About the Way You Look Tonight"†	Elton John	
821	December 13	"Candle in the Wind 1997" / "Something About the Way You Look Tonight"†	Elton John	
821	December 20	"Candle in the Wind 1997" / "Something About the Way You Look Tonight"†	Elton John	
821	December 27	"Candle in the Wind 1997" / "Something About the Way You Look Tonight"†	Elton John	

== Number-one artists ==
List of number-one artists by total weeks at number one
Position	Artist	Weeks at No. 1
1	Puff Daddy	19
2	Elton John	12
3	Faith Evans	11
3	112	11
5	Mase	8
6	Toni Braxton	7
7	The Notorious B.I.G.	5
8	Spice Girls	4
9	Hanson	3
9	Mariah Carey	3
11	Boyz II Men	1

== See also ==
- 1997 in music
- List of Billboard Hot 100 number-one singles of the 1990s

== Additional sources ==
- Fred Bronson's Billboard Book of Number 1 Hits, 5th Edition (ISBN 0-8230-7677-6)
- Joel Whitburn's Top Pop Singles 1955-2008, 12 Edition (ISBN 0-89820-180-2)
- Joel Whitburn Presents the Billboard Hot 100 Charts: The Nineties (ISBN 0-89820-137-3)
- Additional information obtained can be verified within Billboard's online archive services and print editions of the magazine.
