= In My Bed (Dru Hill song) =

Single by Dru Hill

from the album Dru Hill
- Released: 1997
- Recorded: 1996
- Genre: R&B
- Length: 4:45
- Label: Island
- Songwriters: Daryl Simmons, Ralph Stacy, Raphael Brown
- Producers: Ralph B. Stacy, Daryl Simmons

Dru Hill singles chronology
"Tell Me" (1996)	"In My Bed" (1997)	"Never Make a Promise" (1997)

Music video
- "In My Bed" on YouTube

"In My Bed" is a song by American R&B group Dru Hill. It is the second single from their eponymous debut album. The remix was released in 1997 and features both Jermaine Dupri (who also produced the track) and Da Brat. The remix sampled Le Pamplemousse's "Gimme What You Got" (1976).

The single spent three weeks at number-one on the US R&B chart and peaked at number four on the US Billboard Hot 100 chart. The song is performed by group leader Mark "Sisqó" Andrews. The song appears in 2008 video game Grand Theft Auto IV.

== Music video ==
The original music video was directed by Bille Woodruff. The So So Def music video remix was released in May 1997 and was directed by Darren Grant. The music video focuses on Sisqó's girlfriend, who possibly cheats on him with another man, but Sisqó doesn't know anything about it. At the end of the video, Sisqó goes to his house with a bouquet of flowers for his girlfriend when he sees a guy walking out. He goes inside and sadly finds her in bed with a woman and drops the flowers in heartbreak. He leaves the house for a few seconds and goes back in.

== Track listing ==
US CD single
No.	Title	Length
1.	"In My Bed (Radio Edit)"	3:59
2.	"In My Bed" (Acapella)"	4:42
3.	"Tell Me" (Bounce Version)"	4:16

UK CD single (Jermaine Dupri And Linslee Mixes)
No.	Title	Length
1.	"In My Bed (So So Def Mix)"	4:05
2.	"In My Bed (Linslee Mix)"	5:06
3.	"In My Bed (2620 Bedroom Mix)"	4:53
4.	"In My Bed (Album Mix)"	4:45
5.	"In My Bed (So So Def Instrumental)"	4:04
6.	"In My Bed (Linslee Instrumental)"	5:05

12" vinyl promo
No.	Title	Length
1.	"In My Bed" (So So Def Mix)"	4:02
2.	"In My Bed" (Why Why Mix)"	3:57
3.	"In My Bed (2620 Bedroom Mix)"	4:50
4.	"In My Bed (Album Version)"	4:45

European CD single
No.	Title	Length
1.	"In My Bed (LP Version)"	4:45
2.	"In My Bed (So So Def Mix)"	4:03
3.	"In My Bed (2620 Bedroom Mix)"	4:51
4.	"Tell Me (Club Mix)"	9:34

== Charts ==
=== Weekly charts ===
Chart (1997–1998)	Peak position
Canada (Nielsen SoundScan)	24
Germany (GfK)	14
Netherlands (Dutch Top 40 Tipparade)	2
Netherlands (Single Top 100)	49
New Zealand (Recorded Music NZ)	25
Sweden (Sverigetopplistan)	52
Switzerland (Schweizer Hitparade)	31
UK Singles (Official Charts)	16
UK Hip Hop/R&B (Official Charts)	5
US Billboard Hot 100	4
US Hot R&B/Hip-Hop Songs (Billboard)	1
US Rhythmic Airplay (Billboard)	4

=== Year-end charts ===
Chart (1997)	Position
UK Urban (Music Week)	19
US Billboard Hot 100	27
Chart (1998)	Position
Germany (Official German Charts)	81

== Certifications ==
Region	Certification	Certified units/sales
United States (RIAA)	Platinum	1,300,000

== See also ==
- R&B number-one hits of 1997 (USA)
