= Freak Nasty =

American rapper

- Born: Eric Henry Timmons; New Orleans, Louisiana, US
- Origin: Atlanta, Georgia, US
- Genre: Hip hop
- Occupations: Rapper, producer, songwriter, disc jockey
- Instrument: Vocals
- Years active: 1994–present
- Labels: Hard Hood Records; Hard Hood Entertainment; Sony; Cash Money Records
- Website: https://www.instagram.com/officialfreaknastydadip

Eric Henry Timmons, professionally known as Freak Nasty, is an American hip hop recording artist and record producer from New Orleans, Louisiana. He was raised in New Orleans. He is best known for his Top 40 single "Da' Dip" released in 1996 which was a sleeper hit, and ultimately went mainstream in the summer of 1997; it later peaked number 15 on the Hot 100. Later he released "Do What U Feel" from the album Which Way Is Up, but it failed to reach the success of the previous song, making it to No. 87 on the Hot R&B charts.

== Music career ==
Freak Nasty began his career as a DJ and a hip hop producer. He was one of two in a group called PMW. He then found success in Atlanta, Georgia with his first album Freak Nasty, selling close to 300,000 units. His next album Controversee... That's Life... And That's the Way It Is, was a much bigger hit and sold over 5 million units, mainly due to his smash hit single "Da' Dip", which peaked at number 15 on the Billboard Hot 100. In 2007, the single "Do It Just Like a Rockstar" peaked at number 45 on the Billboard Hot 100 due to mistaken ID3 tags. The iTunes Store erroneously titled the song "Party Like a Rockstar", which led to consumers confusing it with the Shop Boyz single of the same name.

== Discography ==
=== Albums ===
- Freak Nasty (1994)
- Controversee...That's Life...And That's the Way It Is (1996)
- Freak Nasty Da' Dip (1997)
- Which Way Is Up? (2000)
- Freak Nasty World (2002)
- Zahira Sims (Party Mix) (2005)
- Freaknotic/Crunk City (2007)

=== Singles ===
Year	Song	U.S. Hot 100	U.S. R&B	U.S. Rap	Album
1996	"Da' Dip"	15	16	4	Controversee...That's Life...And That's the Way It Is
1998	"Do What U Feel"	-	87	33	Which Way Is Up
2005	"Do It Just Like a Rockstar"	45	-	-	Freaknotic
