= All Cried Out (Lisa Lisa and Cult Jam song) =

1986 song recorded by Lisa Lisa and Cult Jam

Single by Lisa Lisa and Cult Jam

from the album Lisa Lisa & Cult Jam with Full Force
- B-side: "Behind My Eyes"
- Released: February 18, 1986
- Label: Columbia
- Songwriters: Curtis Bedeau; Gerald Charles; Hugh Clarke; Brian George; Lucien George; Paul George
- Producer: Full Force

Lisa Lisa and Cult Jam singles chronology
"Can You Feel the Beat" (1985)	"All Cried Out" (1986)	"Head to Toe" (1987)

Music video
- "All Cried Out" on YouTube

"All Cried Out" is a song recorded by American band Lisa Lisa and Cult Jam from their 1985 album Lisa Lisa & Cult Jam with Full Force. The song became a major hit, reaching number eight on the US Billboard Hot 100 in October 1986. It was also a major hit on the US R&B chart, peaking at number three. The song is a ballad structured as a duet between Lisa Lisa and Full Force member Paul Anthony, a departure from the group's typical uptempo freestyle dance sound. It was the third single released from the album, following "I Wonder If I Take You Home" and "Can You Feel the Beat".

The actual artist credit on the label of the 7-inch vinyl release was "Lisa Lisa and Cult Jam with Full Force featuring Paul Anthony & Bow Legged Lou".

== Charts ==
=== Weekly charts ===
Chart (1986)	Peak position
US Billboard Hot 100	8
US Hot Black Singles (Billboard)	3

=== Year-end charts ===
Chart (1986)	Position
US Top Pop Singles (Billboard)	61
US Top Black Singles (Billboard)	14

== Allure version ==
"All Cried Out"

Single by Allure featuring 112

from the album Allure
- Released: August 12, 1997
- Length: 4:35
- Label: Crave
- Songwriters: Curtis Bedeau; Gerald Charles; Hugh Clarke; Brian George; Lucien George; Paul George
- Producers: Cory Rooney; Walter Afanasieff; Mariah Carey

Allure singles chronology
"No Question" (1997)	"All Cried Out" (1997)	"Last Chance" (1998)

112 single singles chronology
"I'll Be Missing You" (1997)	"All Cried Out" (1997)	"Sky's the Limit" (1997)

Music video
- "All Cried Out" on YouTube

In 1997, American contemporary R&B group Allure included their version of "All Cried Out" on their eponymous debut studio album (1997). The song features fellow R&B group 112 and was produced by Cory Rooney, Walter Afanasieff and Mariah Carey.

Allure's version became the group's biggest hit, peaking at number four on the US Billboard Hot 100 the week of November 22, 1997. The single was eventually certified gold for shipments exceeding 500,000; it ultimately sold over 800,000. It appeared on two consecutive Billboard year-end charts, ranking at number 43 on the 1997 chart and number 84 on the 1998 chart. Worldwide, the song entered the top 10 in the Netherlands and New Zealand.

=== Critical reception ===
British magazine Music Week rated the song four out of five, stating that "this ballad shows the four girls' voices at their full potential."

=== Music video ===
The official music video for the song was directed by Christopher Erskin.

=== Track listing ===
1. "All Cried Out" (Radio Edit)- 3:38
2. "All Cried Out" (Hex Hector Radio Mix)- 4:44
3. "All Cried Out" (Hex Hector Dub Mix)- 7:49
4. "All Cried Out" (Hex Hector Main Club Pass)- 10:50

=== Charts ===
==== Weekly charts ====
Chart (1997–1998)	Peak position
Australia (ARIA)	11
Belgium (Ultratop 50 Flanders)	26
Denmark (IFPI)	16
Europe (Eurochart Hot 100)	35
Iceland (Íslenski Listinn Topp 40)	39
Netherlands (Dutch Top 40)	9
Netherlands (Single Top 100)	8
New Zealand (Recorded Music NZ)	2
Norway (VG-lista)	12
Scottish Singles Sales (Official Charts)	36
Sweden (Sverigetopplistan)	16
UK Singles (Official Charts)	12
UK Hip Hop/R&B (Official Charts)	4
US Billboard Hot 100	4
US Dance Singles Sales (Billboard)	4
US Hot R&B Singles (Billboard)	9
US Rhythmic Top 40 (Billboard)	3
US Top 40/Mainstream (Billboard)	6

==== Year-end charts ====
Chart (1997)	Position
US Billboard Hot 100	43
US Hot R&B Singles (Billboard)	50
US Rhythmic Top 40 (Billboard)	37
US Top 40/Mainstream (Billboard)	64

Chart (1998)	Position
Australia (ARIA)	73
US Billboard Hot 100	84
US Mainstream Top 40 (Billboard)	44
US Rhythmic Top 40 (Billboard)	59

=== Certifications ===
Region	Certification	Certified units/sales
Australia (ARIA)	Platinum	70,000^{^}
New Zealand (RMNZ)	Gold	5,000^{*}
United States (RIAA)	Gold	500,000^{^}
^{*} Sales figures based on certification alone.^{^} Shipments figures based on certification alone.
