= Somethin' for the People =

Former contemporary R&B group from Oakland, California (c. 1990 - 2000)

- Somethin' for the People

Background information
- Origin: Oakland, California, U.S.
- Genres: R&B
- Years active: 1990–2000
- Labels: Capitol Records; Warner Bros. Records
- Past members: Curtis "Sauce" Wilson; Rochad "Cat Daddy" Holiday; Jeff "Fuzzy" Young (deceased)

Somethin' for the People was an American R&B group from Oakland, California, who scored several hits in the US in the late 1990s. They were best known for their 1997 hit single "My Love Is the Shhh!" featuring Trina & Tamara.

== History ==
The group was founded in 1990 by Curtis "Sauce" Wilson and Jeff "Fuzzy" Young, both from Oakland, California, along with Los Angeles native Rochad "Cat Daddy" Holiday. The group recorded demos and shopped them around Los Angeles, and signed with Capitol Records, who released their debut in 1993. The song 'Take it Easy', which was first written for SWV. As songwriters, they wrote tunes for Samuelle, En Vogue, Brandy, and U.N.V. Switching to Warner Bros. Records, they re-released their debut album in 1996. Their second album, This Time It's Personal, spawned a major hit in the US and Canada, the platinum-selling "My Love Is the Shhh!", which reached #4 in the US and #7 in Canada, and the group did further work as songwriters in the wake of the tune's success, penning tracks for Will Smith and Adina Howard. A third LP, Issues, followed in July 2000.

Band member Jeff “Fuzzy” Young died on March 4, 2011, from an apparent heart attack.

Curtis "Sauce" Wilson later became an in-house recording engineer and session musician for Ne-Yo.

== Discography ==
=== Studio albums ===
List of albums, with selected chart positions
Title	Album details	Peak chart positions		
Title	Album details	US	US R&B	NL
Somethin' for the People	Released: June 21, 1993; Label: Capitol; Format: CD, cassette	—	66	—
This Time It's Personal	Released: September 23, 1997; Label: Warner Bros.; Format: CD, cassette	154	33	51
Issues	Released: July 18, 2000; Label: Warner Bros.; Format: CD, digital download	124	23	—

=== Singles ===
List of singles, with selected chart positions
Title	Year	Peak chart positions			Album
Title	Year	US	US R&B	UK	Album
"You Want This Party Started"	1995	—	29	—	Somethin' for the People
"Can You Feel Me"	1996	—	91	—	Somethin' for the People
"With You"	1996	98	34	—	Somethin' for the People
"My Love Is the Shhh!"	1997	4	2	64	This Time It's Personal
"Think of You"	1997	—	—	—	This Time It's Personal
"All I Do"	1998	47	15	—	This Time It's Personal
"Bitch with No Man"	2000	—	39	—	Issues
