= Allure (group) =

American R&B girl group

- Origin: Long Island, New York, U.S.
- Genres: R&B
- Years active: 1996–present
- Labels: Crave; MCA; Tru Warier Records; Bridge Works
- Members: Alia Davis; Lalisha Sanders; Akissa Mendez
- Past members: Linnie Belcher

Allure is an American New York-based R&B girl group that formed in the 1990s as a quartet. Now a trio, they are best known for their hit single "All Cried Out" with 112, which reached No. 4 on the Billboard Hot 100. The group's original line-up comprised Alia Davis, Lalisha Sanders, Akissa Mendez and Linnie Belcher, Belcher left the group in 2001.

== Career ==
Formed in Long Island, New York, the group originally consisted of Alia Davis, Akissa Mendez, Lalisha McClean and Linnie Belcher. Alia, Akissa, and Lalisha were attending the Fiorello H. LaGuardia High School in New York City when they decided to become a girl group. They added Linnie Belcher, who was attending the Julia Richman High School at the time. For the next two years, the girls rehearsed and found management connections which brought them to the attention of Poke (from production team Track Masters). Poke worked with the girls and signed them to Track Masters under the name 'Allure' and helped them sign with Mariah Carey's label Crave Records in 1997.

Their debut single "Head Over Heels" (featuring Nas) was released in February, becoming a hit and peaking at #35 on the Billboard Hot 100 and #20 on the US Rhythmic Top 40. It was soon followed by the single "No Question" featuring LL Cool J which gained some airplay, ahead of the release of their self-titled debut album Allure on May 6, 1997. Their next single, a cover of "All Cried Out" featuring 112 was released in August, and became their biggest hit to date, peaking at #4 on the Billboard Hot 100 and #9 on the R&B chart. With the success of the single, their album was certified gold by the RIAA, and a fourth single ("Last Chance", which was co-written by Carey) followed.

In 1998, they appeared on the soundtrack album with 50 Cent for the song “Let it be” for the movie ‘‘Woo’’.

In 1999, they released the single "You're the Only One For Me" from the hit 1999 film Runaway Bride.

After the dissolution of Crave Records, Allure signed with MCA Records in 2000, issuing the single "Enjoy Yourself" which peaked at #50 on the Billboard R&B chart. Their sophomore album Sunny Days followed on November 13, 2001, and opened at #68 on the Billboard R&B Albums chart. A second single "Kool Wit Me" was pushed to radio, yet did not receive much support from the label. Soon after, member Hem-Lee (a.k.a. Linnie Belcher) left the group and the group remained as a trio.

In 2002, they appeared in the Tom Jones' Mr. Jones album, in the song "The Letter." The album was produced by Wyclef Jean, Jerry 'Wonder' Duplessis and Jones himself.

In 2004, they signed with NBA player Ron Artest's newly formed label, Tru Warier Records, distributed by Lightyear Entertainment. Their third album Chapter III, in reference to their lineup change and being their third album, was released on November 23, 2004. It went unnoticed by the general public, although it did receive considerable press due to Ron Artest's suspension from the NBA that year. Two singles were released, 2004's "Uh Oh" featuring reggae artist Elephant Man, and 2005's "I Think I'm In Love" featuring rapper Joe Budden. The album was subsequently released in the UK the following year, including a new track ("You Are The Man") and a remix of the single "Hate 2 Luv U".

In 2008, Allure formed their own label, A.L.A. Recordings, and released their first EP, Patiently Waiting on November 1, 2008. Their fourth album, Time's Up, followed on February 10, 2010. The next year, Allure signed with MC Shan's label Bridge Works, which has digital distribution with Interscope Records. In 2014, the group released a new single "Butterflies" featuring MC Shan.

In 2018, the group announced work on a new album. The first single from the project, "I Do" was announced with a talent search for a female rapper to be included on the song. The single, now titled "Like I Do" and featuring rapper Dejha B was released in November. The song was written by Shanell Red Irving and Jonathan “JJ” Jennings and produced by Brook Brovaz. The music video premiered on November 12.

== Discography ==
=== Studio albums ===
Year	Title	Chart positions		Certifications (sales thresholds)
Year	Title	U.S.	U.S. R&B	Certifications (sales thresholds)
1997	Allure: Released: May 6, 1997; Label: Crave	108	23	US: Gold
2001	Sunny Days: Released: November 13, 2001; Label: MCA	–	68	
2004	Chapter III: Released: November 23, 2004; Label: Lightyear	–	–	
2010	Time's Up: Released: February 10, 2010; Label: A.L.A.	–	–	

=== EPs ===
Year	Title
2008	Patiently Waiting: Released: November 1, 2008; Label: A.L.A.

=== Singles ===
Year	Single	Chart positions				Album
Year	Single	U.S. Hot 100	U.S. R&B	AUS	UK Singles Chart	Album
1997	"Head Over Heels" (featuring Nas)	35	17	—	18	Allure
1997	"No Question" (featuring LL Cool J)	—	—	—	—	Allure
1997	"All Cried Out" (featuring 112)	4	9	11	12	Allure
1998	"Last Chance"	—	—	—	—	Allure
1999	"You're the Only One for Me"	—	—	—	—	Runaway Bride: Music from the Motion Picture
1999	"When the Shades Go Down"	—	—	—	—	The Best Man: Music from the Motion Picture
2001	"Enjoy Yourself"	—	50	—	—	Sunny Days
2004	"Hate 2 Luv U"	—	—	—	—	Chapter III
2004	"Uh Oh" (featuring Elephant Man)	—	—	—	—	Chapter III
2014	"Butterflies" (featuring MC Shan)	—	—	—	—	Non-album singles
2018	"Like I Do" (featuring Dejha B)	—	—	—	—	Non-album singles
