= Can't Nobody Hold Me Down =

1997 single by Puff Daddy featuring Mase

Single by Puff Daddy featuring Mase

from the album No Way Out
- Released: January 7, 1997
- Recorded: 1996
- Studio: Daddy's House Recording Studios (New York City)
- Genre: East Coast hip-hop
- Length: 3:52
- Label: Bad Boy; Arista
- Songwriters: Mason Betha; Steven Jordan; Nashiem Myrick; Carlos Broady; Edward Fletcher; Melvin Glover; Clifton Chase; Sylvia Robinson; Matthew Wilder; Greg Prestopino
- Producers: Sean "Puffy" Combs; Stevie J; Carlos Broady; Nashiem Myrick

Puff Daddy singles chronology
"No Time" (1996)	"Can't Nobody Hold Me Down" (1997)	"I'll Be Missing You" (1997)

Mase singles chronology
"Only You" (1996)	"Can't Nobody Hold Me Down" (1997)	"Just the Way You Like It" (1997)

Music video
- "Can't Nobody Hold Me Down" on YouTube

"Can't Nobody Hold Me Down" is the debut single by American rapper Puff Daddy. It was shipped to radio in December 1996 and physically released by his label Bad Boy Records, an imprint of Arista Records, on January 7, 1997. It was the lead single for the rapper's debut studio album No Way Out (1997). It was written by then-Bad Boy newcomer Mase, who co-performs the song, while production was handled by the label's in-house producers Stevie J, Carlos Broady and Nashiem Myrick, as well as Puff Daddy himself.

"Can't Nobody Hold Me Down" entered the U.S. Billboard Hot 100 at number 32 in early 1997, and later spent six weeks at number one. It was the beginning of Combs' and Bad Boy Records' chart domination during the year—the Combs-produced "Hypnotize" by the Notorious B.I.G. would follow this song at number one, and the B.I.G. tribute song "I'll Be Missing You" spent eleven weeks at number one during the summer, only to be followed by another B.I.G. song, "Mo Money Mo Problems" and then the Combs-produced "Honey" by Mariah Carey. "Can't Nobody Hold Me Down" was the mainstream debut for Mase, who signed with the label months prior.

First released to rhythmic radio in December 1996, Puff Daddy had found success as B.I.G.'s label boss at Bad Boy Records prior to the song's release. He first appeared as a recording artist on Lil' Kim's 1996 single "No Time", which peaked within the Billboard Hot 100's top 20.

== Content ==
The song combines elements of several previous singles, the most obvious being a slowed-down rhythm track sampling from Grandmaster Flash and the Furious Five's "The Message". The track's chorus is an interpolation of "Break My Stride", a top-five single by Matthew Wilder from 1983. The track also contains a sample of opening drums of Michael Jackson's 1979 single "Rock with You".

== Music video ==
The music video was directed by Paul Hunter and it was released in January 1997. The music video features cameos by The Notorious B.I.G. and Eddie Griffin.

== Charts ==
=== Weekly charts ===
Chart (1997)	Peak Position
Australia (ARIA)	27
Canada (Nielsen SoundScan)	1
Germany (GfK)	23
Netherlands (Dutch Top 40 Tipparade)	8
Netherlands (Single Top 100)	59
New Zealand (Recorded Music NZ)	11
Scottish Singles Sales (Official Charts)	60
Switzerland (Schweizer Hitparade)	37
UK Singles (Official Charts)	19
UK Dance (Official Charts)	4
UK Hip Hop/R&B (Official Charts)	2
US Billboard Hot 100	1
US Hot R&B/Hip-Hop Songs (Billboard)	1
US Hot Rap Songs (Billboard)	1
US Rhythmic Airplay (Billboard)	6

=== Year-end charts ===
Chart (1997)	Position
Germany (Media Control)	82
UK Urban (Music Week)	11
US Billboard Hot 100	5
US Hot R&B Singles (Billboard)	4

=== Decade-end charts ===
Chart (1990–1999)	Position
Canada (Nielsen SoundScan)	16
US Billboard Hot 100	27

== Certifications ==
Region	Certification	Certified units/sales
United States (RIAA)	2× Platinum	2,700,000

== Release history ==
Release dates and formats for "Can't Nobody Hold Me Down"
Region	Date	Format(s)	Label(s)	Ref(s).
United States	December 13, 1996	Rhythmic contemporary radio	Bad Boy Entertainment; Arista	
United States	January 7, 1997	CD	Bad Boy Entertainment; Arista	

== See also ==
- List of Billboard Hot 100 number ones of 1997
- List of number-one R&B singles of 1997 (U.S.)
