= B-Rock and the Bizz =

American hip-hop group

B-Rock & the Bizz was a hip-hop group composed of producer and rapper/ singer Baron "B-Rock" Agee, his brother Leevirt Agee from New York City, Paul Costict, and Thaddeus "T-Bird" Maye from Prichard, Alabama. Leevirt Agee and T-Bird Maye were known as the Bizz.

The group is best known for its novelty single "My Baby Daddy", which peaked at #10 on the Billboard Hot 100 in April 1997.

In 1999, Terius "The Dream" Nash replaced T-Bird Maye on the group's second album, titled Porkin' Beans & Wienes.

In 1997, the female Miami bass hip-hop group Anquette released an answer song to "My Baby Daddy", titled "My Baby Mama".

In 2008, Costict was on an episode of Divorce Court, seeking the return of his gold album from his wife, former music video model and actress Lasancious McCadney, also known as Cherry Lequa.

In October 2023, Costict died at his home in Norfolk, Virginia the age of 57.
