= Da' Dip =

Single by Freak Nasty

from the album Controversee...That's Life...And That's the Way It Is
- B-side: "Bump That Rump"
- Released: 1996
- Recorded: 1996
- Genre: Miami bass; hip hop
- Length: 3:57
- Label: Triad
- Songwriter: Freak Nasty
- Producer: Freak Nasty

Freak Nasty singles chronology
"Da' Dip" (1996)	"Do What U Feel" (1998)

"Da' Dip" is a song written and recorded by American hip hop artist Freak Nasty. It was released in 1996 as the lead single from his second album, Controversee...That's Life...And That's the Way It Is. To date, "Da' Dip" is Freak Nasty's only top forty hit.

Upon its initial release in mid-1996, "Da' Dip" failed to make an impact on the Billboard charts, charting low on both the R&B and rap charts. The song, however, managed to break through into the mainstream the following year, reaching number 15 on the Billboard Hot 100. "Da' Dip" was then certified gold by the RIAA on April 10, 1997 before reaching platinum certification on June 3 of that year for shipments exceeding one million copies; the single sold one million units in 1997 alone. In 2024, the song gained popularity on TikTok with users recreating the dance from its music video.

== Single track listing ==
1. "Da' Dip" (Clean) – 3:52
2. "Down Low" (Clean Remix) – 4:23
3. "Bump That Rump" (Clean Remix) – 3:43
4. "Da' Dip" (Instrumental) – 3:52

== Charts ==
Chart (1997)	Peak position
Canada Dance (RPM)	1
US Billboard Hot 100	15
US Hot R&B/Hip-Hop Songs (Billboard)	16
US Hot Rap Songs (Billboard)	4
US Pop Airplay (Billboard)	31
US Rhythmic Airplay (Billboard)	6

== Certifications ==
Region	Certification	Certified units/sales
United States (RIAA)	Platinum	1,000,000^{^}
^{^} Shipments figures based on certification alone.

== In other media ==
- In 2012, the song was parodied in a commercial for Hefty's ZooPals paper plates.
- In 2013, the song was sampled by Danny Brown for his song "Dip" from his album Old.
- In 2014, the song was referenced in the film Paul Blart: Mall Cop 2, where the lyrics mentioning "Dip" are replaced with "Zip."
- In 2017, the song was interpolated by Cardi B for her song "Bodak Yellow", which would go on to peak at #1 on the Billboard Hot 100 in October of the same year.
- In 2019, the song was interpolated by Snotty Nose Rez Kids for their song "Boujee Natives".
- In 2022, it was parodied by the Arby's fast-food chain in a commercial advertising a new French dip sandwich.
