= My Baby Daddy =

Single by B-Rock and the Bizz

from the album Porkin' Beans & Wienes
- Released: April 1, 1997
- Recorded: 1997
- Genre: Comedy hip hop, Miami bass, dance-pop
- Length: 3:34
- Label: Tony Mercedes/LaFace/Arista/BMG
- Songwriters: B-Rock, Maurice White, Al McKay
- Producer: B-Rock

"My Baby Daddy" is a single by B-Rock and the Bizz from its debut album Porkin' Beans & Wienes. The song uses a sample of "Best of My Love" by the Emotions.

Released in early 1997, the song became a top-10 hit for the group, reaching 10 on the Billboard Hot 100. A month after its release, the single had sold 500,000 copies and earned a gold certification on May 28, 1997, from the Recording Industry Association of America. Despite the success of the single, problems with its label LaFace Records resulted in the group leaving the label without releasing a follow-up single or its debut album. The album was eventually released two years later (in late 1999) on the independent label Tony Mercedes. However, the group never released another single or album.

== Single track listing ==
1. "My Baby Daddy" (Radio Edit)- 3:34
2. "My Baby Daddy" (Bassed Out Club Mix)- 4:42
3. "My Baby Daddy" (Instrumental)- 3:34
4. "My Baby Daddy" (Acappella)- 3:35

== Charts and certifications ==
=== Weekly charts ===
Chart (1997)	Peak position
US Billboard Hot 100	10
US Billboard Hot Rap Singles	2
US Billboard Hot Dance Music/Maxi-Singles Sales	7
US Billboard Rhythmic Top 40	23

=== Year-end charts ===
Chart (1997)	Position
US Billboard Hot 100	68

=== Certifications ===
Region	Certification	Certified units/sales
United States (RIAA)	Gold	500,000
