= Dru Hill discography =

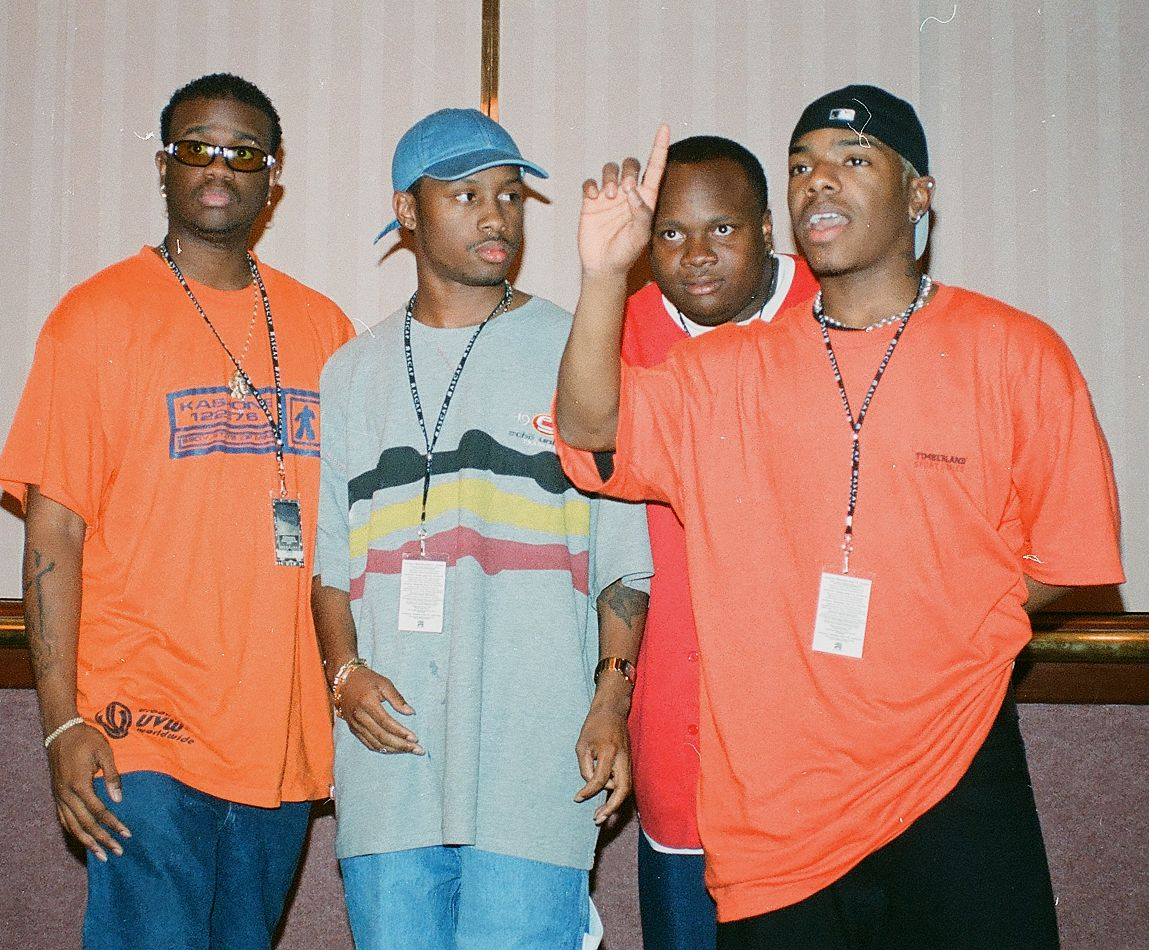
- Studio albums: 4
- Extended plays: 1
- Live albums: 1
- Compilation albums: 3
- Singles: 18
- Music videos: 18

The following is the discography of American R&B group Dru Hill.

== Albums ==
=== Studio albums ===
| Year | Album details | Peak chart positions | | | | | | | Certifications (sales threshold) |
| Year | Album details | US | US R&B | US Indie | AUS | CAN | NL | UK | Certifications (sales threshold) |
|---|---|---|---|---|---|---|---|---|---|
| 1996 | Dru Hill: Release date: November 19, 1996; Label: Island Records | 23 | 5 | — | — | — | — | — | RIAA: Platinum |
| 1998 | Enter the Dru: Release date: October 27, 1998; Label: Island Records | 2 | 2 | — | 76 | 11 | 27 | 42 | RIAA: 2× Platinum; BPI: Gold; MC: Gold |
| 2002 | Dru World Order: Release date: November 26, 2002; Label: Def Soul Records | 21 | 2 | — | — | — | — | 156 | RIAA: Gold |
| 2010 | InDRUpendence Day: Release date: July 27, 2010; Label: Kedar Entertainment Group | 30 | 10 | 3 | — | — | — | — | |
"—" denotes releases that did not chart

=== Compilation albums ===
| Year | Album details | Peak chart positions | |
| Year | Album details | US | US R&B |
|---|---|---|---|
| 2005 | Hits: Release date: October 11, 2005; Label: Def Soul Classics | 72 | 22 |
| 2007 | 20th Century Masters – The Millennium Collection: Release date: March 13, 2007; Label: Def Soul/Island | — | — |
| 2012 | Icon: Release date: January 10, 2012; Label: Universal Music Distribution | — | — |
"—" denotes releases that did not chart

=== Live albums ===
| Year | Details |
|---|---|
| 2014 | At Last: Live in Concert: Recorded on October 1, 2014 at the Howard Theatre; Given away with The Vipfan Reward Program |

== EPs ==
| Year | EP details |
|---|---|
| 2017 | Christmas in Baltimore: First EP; Release date: November 24, 2017; Label: Dru Hill, LLC / Empire |

== Singles ==
=== As a lead artist ===
| Year | Single | Peak chart positions | | | | | | | | | | Certifications (sales threshold) | Album |
| Year | Single | US | US R&B | US Dance | AUS | NL | NZ | CAN | SWE | SWI | UK | Certifications (sales threshold) | Album |
|---|---|---|---|---|---|---|---|---|---|---|---|---|---|
| 1996 | "Tell Me" | 18 | 5 | — | — | — | — | — | — | — | 30 | RIAA: Gold | Dru Hill |
| 1997 | "In My Bed" | 4 | 1 | — | — | 49 | 25 | — | 52 | 31 | 16 | RIAA: Platinum | Dru Hill |
| 1997 | "Never Make a Promise" | 7 | 1 | — | — | — | — | — | — | — | — | RIAA: Gold | Dru Hill |
| 1997 | "5 Steps" ^{[A]} | — | 7 | — | — | — | — | — | — | — | 22 | | Dru Hill |
| 1997 | "We're Not Making Love No More" | 13 | 2 | — | — | — | 33 | — | — | — | — | RIAA: Gold | Soul Food (soundtrack) |
| 1998 | "How Deep Is Your Love" (featuring Redman) | 3 | 1 | — | 13 | 6 | 26 | 16 | 4 | 10 | 9 | RIAA: Gold; BPI: Silver | Enter the Dru |
| 1998 | "These Are the Times" | 21 | 5 | — | 22 | — | 36 | 11 | — | — | 4 | | Enter the Dru |
| 1999 | "The Love We Had (Stays on My Mind)" | — | 48 | — | — | — | — | — | — | — | — | | Enter the Dru |
| 1999 | "You Are Everything" (featuring Ja Rule) | 84 | 27 | — | 90 | 43 | — | 9 | — | — | — | | Enter the Dru |
| 1999 | "Beauty" | 79 | 24 | — | — | — | — | — | — | — | — | | Enter the Dru |
| 2002 | "I Should Be..." | 25 | 6 | — | — | — | — | — | — | — | — | | Dru World Order |
| 2003 | "I Love You" | 77 | 27 | 31 | — | — | — | — | — | — | — | | Dru World Order |
| 2010 | "Love MD" | — | — | — | — | — | — | — | — | — | — | | InDRUpendence Day |
| 2010 | "Remain Silent" | — | — | — | — | — | — | — | — | — | — | | InDRUpendence Day |
| 2010 | "Back to the Future" | — | — | — | — | — | — | — | — | — | — | | InDRUpendence Day |
| 2017 | "Favorite Time of Year" | — | — | — | — | — | — | — | — | — | — | | Christmas in Baltimore |
| 2020 | "What You Need" | — | — | — | — | — | — | — | — | — | — | | TBA |
"—" denotes releases that did not chart

Note ^{A} Did not chart on Hot R&B/Hip-Hop Songs chart (Billboard rules at the time prevented album cuts from charting). Chart peak listed represents the Hot R&B/Hip-Hop Airplay chart.

=== Featured singles ===
| Year | Single | Artist | Peak chart positions | | | | | | | | | Album |
| Year | Single | Artist | US | US R&B | US Rap | AUS | NL | NZ | SWE | SWI | UK | Album |
|---|---|---|---|---|---|---|---|---|---|---|---|---|
| 1997 | "Big Bad Mama" | Foxy Brown | 53 | 10 | 9 | — | 41 | 8 | 51 | 23 | 12 | How to Be a Player (soundtrack) |
| 1999 | "Wild Wild West" | Will Smith w/ Kool Moe Dee | 1 | 3 | — | 8 | 2 | 2 | 4 | 2 | 2 | Wild Wild West (soundtrack) |
| 2000 | "Love Sets You Free (Remix)" | Kelly Price w/ Various Artists | 91 | 14 | — | — | — | — | — | — | — | Mirror Mirror |

== Guest appearances ==
List of non-single guest appearances, with other performing artists, showing year released and album name
| Title | Year | Other performer(s) | Album |
|---|---|---|---|
| "This Christmas" | 1996 | —N/a | Island Black Music Christmas Album |
| "The Beautiful Ones" | 1997 | Mariah Carey | Butterfly |
| "Every Nation" | 1997 | Red Hot R+B All Stars | Diana, Princess of Wales: Tribute |
| "Big Mama (Unconditional Love)" | 2002 | LL Cool J | 10 |
| "Crazy Luv" | 2005 | Cooli Hi | Crown Victoria |
| "Out of Control" | 2008 | Cooli Hi | Crown Victoria - the Sequel |
| "Rollercoaster" | 2010 | Ludacris | Battle of the Sexes |
| "Missing You Like Crazy" | 2016 | Keith Sweat | Dress To Impress |

== Soundtrack appearances ==
List of songs with performers
| Year | Song | Other performer(s) | Album |
|---|---|---|---|
| 1996 | "Tell Me" | —N/a | Eddie (soundtrack) |
| 1997 | "Big Bad Mamma" | Foxy Brown | How to Be a Player (soundtrack) |
| 1997 | "We're Not Making Love No More" | —N/a | Soul Food (soundtrack) |
| 1998 | "How Deep Is Your Love" | Redman | Rush Hour (soundtrack) |
| 1999 | "Enchantment Passing Through" | —N/a | Elton John and Tim Rice's Aida |
| 1999 | "Wild Wild West" | Will Smith, Kool Moe Dee | Wild Wild West (soundtrack) |

== Music videos ==
List of music videos, with directors and artists
| Title | Year | Director(s) | Artist(s) | Note(s) |
|---|---|---|---|---|
| "Tell Me" | 1996 | Terry Heller | Dru Hill | |
| "In My Bed" | 1997 | Bille Woodruff | Dru Hill | |
| "In My Bed (So So Def Remix)" | 1997 | Darren Grant | Dru Hill | |
| "Never Make a Promise" | 1997 | Frank Sacramento | Dru Hill | |
| "Big Bad Mamma" | 1997 | Joseph Kahn | Foxy Brown, Dru Hill | |
| "5 Steps" | 1997 | Frank Sacramento | Dru Hill | |
| "We're Not Making Love No More" | 1997 | Christopher Erskin | Dru Hill | |
| "It's All About Me" | 1998 | G. Thomas Ferguson, Haqq Islam | Mýa, Sisqó, Dru Hill | All members of Dru Hill appear at the start of the video |
| "How Deep Is Your Love" | 1998 | Brett Ratner | Dru Hill | |
| "These Are the Times" | 1999 | Bille Woodruff | Dru Hill | |
| "Wild Wild West" | 1999 | Paul Hunter | Will Smith, Dru Hill, Kool Moe Dee | |
| "You Are Everything" | 1999 | Martin Weisz | Dru Hill, Ja Rule | |
| "Love Sets You Free (Remix)" | 2000 | Chris Robinson | Kelly Price, Dru Hill, Montell Jordan, Case, Playa, Kandice Love, LovHer | |
| "I Should Be..." | 2002 | Chris Robinson | Dru Hill | |
| "I Love You" | 2003 | Little X | Dru Hill | |
| "Love MD" | 2010 | Bille Woodruff | Dru Hill | |
| "Favorite Time of Year" | 2017 | Don Trunk | Dru Hill | |
| "T'is the Season" | 2017 | Jack Thriller | Dru Hill | |

== Home videos ==
| Title | Video details | Note(s) |
|---|---|---|
| Dru Hill Hits: The Videos | Released: October 11, 2005; Label: Def Soul Classics; Formats: DVD | Includes videos for "Thong Song" and "Incomplete" |
