= Hits (Dru Hill album) =

Compilation album by Dru Hill
- Released: October 11, 2005
- Recorded: 1995–2002
- Genre: R&B
- Length: N/A
- Label: Def Soul Classics
- Producer: Hiriam Hicks, Dru Hill, Nokio the N-Tity

Dru Hill chronology
Dru World Order (2002)	Hits (2005)	InDRUpendence Day (2010)

Hits is a greatest hits album by American R&B group Dru Hill. It was released on October 17, 2005 by Def Soul Classics. It features hits like "Tell Me" "In My Bed", "How Deep Is Your Love", "5 Steps", and "Never Make a Promise". It also features Sisqó's solo hits "Thong Song" and "Incomplete". Hits features on the billboard 100https://www.billboard.com/artist/dru-hill/

== Track listing ==
1. "Tell Me" from the Eddie soundtrack and Dru Hill
2. "In My Bed" from Dru Hill
3. "Never Make a Promise" from Dru Hill
4. "Big Bad Mamma" (Foxy Brown featuring Dru Hill) from How to Be a Player and Ill Na Na
5. "5 Steps" from Dru Hill
6. "We're Not Making Love No More" from the Soul Food (soundtrack)
7. "How Deep Is Your Love" (Single Version featuring Redman) original from the Rush Hour soundtrack and Enter the Dru
8. "These Are the Times" from Enter the Dru
9. "The Love We Had (Stays on My Mind)" from Enter the Dru
10. "Beauty" from Enter the Dru
11. "You Are Everything" from Enter the Dru
12. "I Should Be..." from Dru World Order
13. "No Doubt (Work It)" from Dru World Order
14. "I Love You" from Dru World Order
15. "Thong Song" (Sisqó) from Unleash the Dragon
16. "Incomplete" (Sisqó) from Unleash the Dragon
17. "In My Bed (So So Def Remix)" (featuring Jermaine Dupri & Da Brat)
