= Dru World Order =

Studio album by Dru Hill
- Released: November 26, 2002
- Recorded: October 2001–August 2002
- Genre: R&B; soul
- Length: 55:36
- Label: Def Soul; Def Jam
- Producer: Kevin Liles (exec.); Nokio the N-Tity (also exec.); Dru Hill (also co-exec.); Jaha Johnson (co-exec.); Kenneth Crear (co-exec.); Tina Davis (co-exec.); Bryan Michael Cox; Darryl Pearson; The Featherstones; Kwamé; Nocko; PAJAM; Sean "Mocca" Banks; Warryn Campbell

Dru Hill chronology
Enter the Dru (1998)	Dru World Order (2002)	InDRUpendence Day (2010)

Singles from Dru World Order
- 1. "I Should Be..." Released: December 23, 2002; 2. "I Love You" Released: January 14, 2003; 3. "No Doubt" Released: April 1, 2003

Professional ratings
Review scores
Source	Rating
Allmusic	3.5/5 stars
Rolling Stone	3/5 stars
USA Today	3/4 stars

Dru World Order is the third studio album by American R&B group Dru Hill, released on November 26, 2002.

It is Dru Hill's first and only album to be released under Def Soul, an R&B division of Universal Music's Def Jam Recordings. It was a result of a company merger that had PolyGram, its music labels and artist roster consolidated into Universal in December 1998; Dru Hill's previous two albums were released under sister label Island Records, before they were drafted to Def Jam as a result of the merger.

Four years had passed since the group's previous album, Enter the Dru (1998), during which time the quartet imploded, yet later reformed in 2001. Prior to the release of Dru World Order, Dru Hill became a quintet, with fifth member Rufus "Scola" Waller added to the original lineup of Sisqó, Jazz, Nokio and Woody. This was the first time that Dru Hill was featured as five members; as well as the only album to feature Scola.

The album released three singles "I Should Be...", "I Love You" and "No Doubt".

== Background ==
Following the release of Enter The Dru's final single, "You Are Everything", in the summer of 1999, Dru Hill was reduced to a trio when Woody left the act to become a gospel singer after an incident during a concert in Paris that resulted in a non-fatal shooting. During this period, the group's label, Island Records, was merged with Def Jam Recordings, following PolyGram's sale to Seagram and later acquisition by Universal Music Group, combining into a unit known as the Island Def Jam Music Group. As a result, Island and Mercury Records' urban roster (including Dru Hill) were reassigned to Def Jam; its R&B artists were moved to Def Jam's R&B imprint, Def Soul. The new label renegotiated the group's contracts and successfully returned Woody to the fold. The intended plan was for each member to record a solo album, and then regroup in a year to record Dru World Order. However, lead singer Sisqó's solo album, Unleash the Dragon, was a notable success, selling at four million copies, twice as much as Enter the Dru. The album's singles such as "Thong Song" and "Incomplete" became top five hits on the Billboard Hot 100; the latter became a number one hit. When the group reformed in November 2000, it imploded, and Dru Hill was placed on an indefinite hiatus, resulting the other three members' solo projects being pushed back and later shelved.

One completed recording from the aborted fall 2000 sessions, "Without You", was included on Sisqó's second solo album, Return of Dragon. Unlike Unleash the Dragon, Return of Dragon was not a success. After the group members reunited at the funeral of Woody's mother, Dru Hill made plans to reform. Woody, who had released his solo gospel album on Kirk Franklin's Gospocentric Records in the spring of 2002, agreed to the reunion, as did Jazz. Dru Hill also hired Rufus "Scola" Waller, a local artist from their hometown of Baltimore, as a fifth member.

== Overview ==
Initially, Def Soul and most of the Def Jam staff were not interested on a Dru Hill reunion, given the long period of time since the group's predecessor, and the relative failure of Sisqó's second solo album. The group won the label over with "I Should Be...", a song written by a teenaged local R&B act from Baltimore called "Everidae", a member of The Featherstones, alongside Jeriel Askew. The new five-man lineup began recording Dru World Order in October 2001, with Nokio taking creative control and executive production of the project.

"I Should Be" peaked at number 25 on the Billboard Hot 100 pop singles chart in the United States, and number six on the Billboard Hot R&B/Hip-Hop Singles & Tracks chart. Its follow-up, "I Love You", was less successful, peaking at number 77 pop and number 21 R&B spring 2003. The album itself peaked at number 21 on the Billboard 200 albums chart, and at number 2 on the Billboard R&B/Hip-Hop Albums chart selling 122,000 copies in its first week. The album was certified gold by the RIAA for shipments in excess of 500,000 copies.

== Track listing ==
Dru World Order track listing
No.	Title	Writer(s)	Producer(s)	Length
1.	"Love/Hate"	Tamir Ruffin; Darryl Pearson; Darrell Adams	Nokio the N-Tity; Pearson	1:38
2.	"Xstacey Jones"	Ruffin; Case Woodard; Terrance Quaites; Pearson	Nokio The N-Tity; Pearson^{[a]}	4:36
3.	"I Should Be..."	Justin Featherstone; Alonzo Joyner; Jeriel Askew; Matthew Featherstone; Christopher Featherstone	The Featherstones; Roundtable/Kidrow Productions; Sisqó^{[a]}	4:57
4.	"If I Could"	Tamara Savage; Bryan-Michael Cox; Mark Andrews; Rufus Waller; Gregory Curtis	Cox; Nokio The N-Tity^{[b]}	4:13
5.	"No Doubt"	Andrews; Ruffin; Kwamé Holland	K-1 Million	3:48
6.	"On Me" (featuring N.O.R.E.)	Andrews; Ruffin; Rufus Waller; Victor Santiago	Nokio The N-Tity; Sisqó	3:29
7.	"Old Love"	James Moss	PAJAM	3:40
8.	"She Said" (featuring Chinky of LovHer)	Ruffin	Nokio The N-Tity	4:18
9.	"I Do (Millions)"	Sean Banks; Marvin Winans	Sean "Moccaa" Banks; Nokio The N-Tity^{[b]}	3:44
10.	"I Love You"	Ruffin; Mark Andrews; Rufus Waller; Dennis Moorehead	Nocko; Nokio The N-Tity	5:13
11.	"Never Stop Loving You"	Larry Anthony; Wirlie Morris; Alan Floyd	Morris; Floyd; Jazz Dru-Daddy	4:41
12.	"Men Always Regret"	Ruffin	Nokio The N-Tity	4:10
13.	"My Angel"/"How Could You"	Warryn Campbell; Andrews; James Green	Campbell	7:19
Total length:				55:36

Notes

- ^a signifies additional producer(s)
- ^b signifies co-producer(s)

Sample credits

- 1 "I Do (Millions)" interpolates the composition "Millions", written by Marvin Winans.

== Personnel ==
- Lead and background vocals – Sisqó (Mark Andrews), Jazz (Larry Anthony), Nokio (Tamir Ruffin), Scola (Rufus Waller) and Woody (James Green)
- Guest vocals – Chinky of LovHer (Lead & Background on track 8), Kwamé (track 5), N.O.R.E. (6)
- Additional background vocals – Darrell "Dezo" Adams (track 1), Jessica Rivera (6), J. Moss (7), Eritza Laues (8), Jazz Dru-Daddy (11)
- Vocal arrangements – Nokio (track 8), Jazz, Phil Weatherspoon (8), Alan Floyd
- Vocal production – Bryan Michael Cox, Tamara Savage, Sisqó
- Bass guitar – Darryl Pearson (track 8)
- Guitars – Darryl Pearson (track 2), Billy "Spaceman" Patterson (Lead on 8)
- Piano, organ, drums – Nocko (track 12)
- Keyboards – Jeriel "Baby J" Askew, Nathan "Boy Genius" Mooring, Darryl Pearson (track 2), Kenya "Fame Flames" Miller, Kwamé, Wirlie Morris, Nocko
- Drum machine – Jeriel "Baby J" Askew, Nathan "Boy Genius" Mooring, Darryl Pearson, Kenya "Fame Flames" Miller, Kwamé, Wirlie Morris
- Music programming – Jeriel "Baby J" Askew (Instruments on track 3), Nocko (tracks 8, 12)
- Multiple instruments – Nathan "Boy Genius" Mooring (track 3), Kwamé Holland (5), Wirlie Morris (11)
- String arrangements and conducting – Benjamin Wright (tracks 2, 10), Clare Fischer (8)
- Arranging – Guy Roche, Sisqó
- Strings – Assa Drori (Violin on track 8), Antoly Rosinsky (Violin on 8), Elizabeth Wilson (Violin on 8), Igor Kiskatch (Violin on 8), Amy Hershberger (Violin on 8), Julie Rogers (Violin on 8), Jerry Epstein (Viola on 8), John Hayhurst (Viola on 8), Cecilia Tsan (Cello on 8), Richard Treat (Cello on 8), Arni Egilsson (Double Bass on 8)
- Recording engineers – Serban Ghenea (tracks 1–2, 8), John Gordon (1–3, 5–6, 8, 10, 12–13), John Hanes (Additional Pro-Tools on 1–2, 6, 8–12), Jan Fairchild (2, 5, 13, Strings on 2 & 10, Vocals on 7), Reggie Dozier (3), Chris Young, Eric "Ebo" Butler (5), Ann Mincieli, Tom Soares (6, 8), Kevin Blott (Instruments on 7), PAJAM (Instruments on 7), Pat Viala (8), Larry Mah (8), Greg Smith (9), Nocko (12, Vocals & Other Instruments on 10), Robert "Tkae" Mendez
- Audio mixing – Serban Ghenea (tracks 1–2, 8–12), Manny Marroquin (3, 5, 7, 13), Tim Roberts (1–2, 6, 8–12), Stephen George (5), Rabeka Tunei (7)
- Production coordinator – Sandra Campbell ("My Angel/How Could You")
- Mastering – Chris Gehringer
- A&R direction – Nokio, Sisqó, Jaha Johnson
- A&R manager – Leesa D. Brunson
- A&R coordinator – Tara Podolsky
- Recording administration – Terese Joseph
- Product consultant – Delroy Morgan
- Art direction and design – Akisia Grigsby, Robert Sims
- Photography – Anthony Mandler
- Stylist – April Roomet

== Charts ==
=== Weekly charts ===
Chart (2002)	Peak position
Canadian R&B Albums (Nielsen SoundScan)	24
US Billboard 200	21
US Top R&B/Hip-Hop Albums (Billboard)	2

=== Year-end charts ===
Chart (2003)	Position
US Billboard 200	131
US Top R&B/Hip-Hop Albums (Billboard)	31

== Certifications ==
Region	Certification	Certified units/sales
United States (RIAA)	Gold	500,000^{^}
^{^} Shipments figures based on certification alone.
