= I Love You (Dru Hill song) =

Single by Dru Hill

from the album Dru World Order
- Released: June 24, 2003
- Genre: R&B, hip hop soul
- Length: 5:16
- Label: Def Soul
- Songwriters: Tamir Ruffin; Mark Andrews; Rufus Waller; Dennis Moorehead
- Producers: Nocko, Nokio The N-Tity

Dru Hill singles chronology
"I Should Be..." (2002)	"I Love You" (2003)	"Love MD" (2010)

Music video
- "I Love You" on YouTube

"I Love You" is the second single from Dru Hill's third album, Dru World Order. The single peaked at #77 on the Hot 100 and #27 on the R&B chart. The song stayed on the Hot 100 charts for a total of thirteen weeks. This was Dru Hill's final charting single to date.

== Music video ==
The music video was directed by Little X. The music video features actress and model La’Shontae Heckard, who plays Nokio's girlfriend, and Nokio's real life son, Jordan Ruffin.

== Track listing ==
CD single
No.	Title	Length
1.	"I love You"	5:16
2.	"I Should Be..."	4:58

2 × 12" Vinyl
No.	Title	Length
1.	"I Love You (Atlantis 760 AD Club Mix)"	7:36
2.	"I Love You (Atlantis 760 AD Dub)"	7:18
3.	"I Love You (Ricky's Loving Club Mix)"	6:53
4.	"I Love You (Ricky's Café Con Leche Dub)"	6:37
5.	"I Love You (Uncle Bubble Aka Ming & FS Vocal Club)"	6:51
6.	"I Love You (Uncle Bubble Aka Ming & FS Dub)"	6:09
7.	"I Love You (Mantese Vocal Club Mix)"	6:58
8.	"I Love You (Mantese Dub)"	6:44

== Charts ==
=== Weekly charts ===
Chart (2003)	Peak position
US Billboard Hot 100	77
US Dance Club Songs (Billboard) Remix	31
US Hot R&B/Hip-Hop Songs (Billboard)	27

=== Year-end charts ===
Chart (2003)	Position
US Hot R&B/Hip-Hop Songs (Billboard)	94
