= Got to Get It (Sisqó song) =

1999 single by Sisqó

Single by Sisqó featuring Make It Hot

from the album Unleash the Dragon
- Released: November 2, 1999
- Studio: The Tracken Place, Larrabee West (Los Angeles)
- Length: 2:54
- Label: Def Soul
- Songwriters: Mark Andrews, Al West, Marquis Collins, James Travis
- Producers: Sisqó, Al West

Sisqó singles chronology
"It's All About Me" (1998)	"Got to Get It" (1999)	"Thong Song" (2000)

Music video
- "Got to Get It" on YouTube

"Got to Get It" is the debut solo single of Sisqó from Dru Hill featuring Make It Hot. It is the first single from Sisqó's debut solo album, Unleash the Dragon. The single peaked at number 40 on the US Billboard Hot 100 chart and number 12 on the Billboard Hot R&B/Hip-Hop Singles & Tracks chart. In Australia, the song was released twice: once as a solo single and again as a double A-side with "Incomplete" in 2001, when it reached the top 30.

== Music video ==
The music video for the song was directed by Hype Williams and features Sisqó singing the song on top of a building then goes straight to Make It Hot's performance with clips of Sisqó playing a guitar. The video ends with Sisqó dancing with women.

== Track listings ==
CD single
No.	Title	Length
1.	"Got to Get It"	2:43
2.	"Got to Get It" (featuring Make It Hot)	2:53
3.	"Got to Get It" (instrumental)	2:54
4.	"Got to Get It" (video)	3:08

LP single
No.	Title	Length
1.	"Got to Get It" (radio edit)
2.	"Got to Get It" (LP version)
3.	"Got to Get It" (instrumental)	2:54
4.	"Got to Get It" (a cappella)

== Credits and personnel ==
Credits are adapted from the liner notes of Unleash the Dragon.

Recording locations

- The Tracken Place and Larrabee West (Los Angeles)

Personnel

- Mixed By – Manny Marroquin
- Producer – Sisqo The Golden Child for Da Ish Entertainment and Al West
- Recorded By – Jan Fairchild
- Written By – Mark Andrews & Al West

== Weekly charts ==
=== Weekly charts ===
Chart (1999–2001)	Peak position
Australia (ARIA)	28
Australian Urban (ARIA)	5
Europe (European Hot 100 Singles)	50
Germany (GfK)	48
Netherlands (Dutch Top 40)	36
Netherlands (Single Top 100)	42
New Zealand (Recorded Music NZ)	50
Scottish Singles Sales (Official Charts)	45
UK Singles (Official Charts)	14
UK Dance (Official Charts)	9
US Billboard Hot 100	40
US Hot R&B/Hip-Hop Songs (Billboard)	12
US Rhythmic Airplay (Billboard)	14

=== Year-end charts ===
Chart (2000)	Position
US Hot R&B/Hip-Hop Singles & Tracks (Billboard)	56

== Release history ==
Region	Version	Date	Format(s)	Label(s)	Ref.
United States	"Got to Get It"	November 2, 1999	Urban radio	Def Soul	
United States	"Got to Get It"	January 11, 2000	Contemporary hit radio	Def Soul	
United Kingdom	"Got to Get It"	January 31, 2000	12-inch vinyl; CD; cassette	Def Soul	
Australia	"Got to Get It" / "Incomplete"	January 8, 2001	CD	Def Soul	
