= You Are Everything (Dru Hill song) =

1999 single by Dru Hill

Single by Dru Hill

from the album Enter the Dru
- Released: May 1999
- Genre: R&B (album version); Electro (remix)
- Length: 4:34
- Label: Island
- Songwriters: Mark Andrews, Rick Cousin
- Producers: Sisqó, Dutch

Dru Hill singles chronology
"These Are the Times" (1999)	"You Are Everything" (1999)	"I Should Be..." (2002)

"You Are Everything" is the fourth and final single released from Dru Hill's second album, Enter the Dru. The single reached number 84 on the Hot 100 and number 27 on the R&B/Hip Hop charts. The remix, which features rapper Ja Rule, was released on Sisqó's solo album Unleash the Dragon.

== Music video ==
The music video features the remix of the song with Ja Rule. It was directed by Martin Weisz. This was their first music video as a trio due to Woody leaving the group during the Wild Wild West video shoot to pursue Gospel music.

== Track listing ==
US CD single
No.	Title	Length
1.	"You Are Everything (Radio Edit)"	4:09
2.	"You Are Everything (Instrumental)"	4:34
3.	"You Are Everything (Acapella)"	4:27

US CD single remix
No.	Title	Length
1.	"You Are Everything (Remix Featuring Ja Rule) (Radio Edit)"	3:44
2.	"You Are Everything (Album Version Radio Edit)"	4:09
3.	"You Are Everything (Soulsisstah Remix)"	4:55
4.	"You Are Everything (Bini & Martini Vocal Mix)"	7:46

12" US vinyl single
No.	Title	Length
1.	"You Are Everything (Remix) (Radio) Featuring Ja Rule"	3:44
2.	"You Are Everything (Remix) (Explicit) Featuring Ja Rule"	4:18
3.	"You Are Everything (Remix) (Instrumental)"	4:18
4.	"You Are Everything (Radio)"	4:09
5.	"You Are Everything (Album)"	4:36
6.	"You Are Everything (Instrumental)"	4:36

== Charts ==
Chart (1999)	Peak position
Australia (ARIA Charts)	90
Canada (Nielsen SoundScan)	9
Netherlands (Single Top 100)	43
US Billboard Hot 100	84
US Hot R&B/Hip-Hop Songs (Billboard)	27
