= Def Soul =

Contemporary R&B division of Def Jam Records

Def Soul Records
- The New Soul of R&B Flavor; The Island Def Jam Music Group a Universal Music company
- Parent company: Universal Music Group
- Founded: 1996; 30 years ago
- Founder: Russell Simmons; Kevin Liles
- Defunct: 2011
- Status: Folded
- Distributors: Def Jam Recordings (United States); Mercury Records (United Kingdom); Universal Music Group (International); Universal Music Enterprises (reissues)
- Genre: Contemporary R&B; soul; neo soul
- Country of origin: United States
- Location: New York City, New York
- Official website: Archived 22 April 2003 at the Wayback Machine

Def Soul Records was an R&B-based division of American multinational record label Def Jam Recordings. It was formed in 1996 by Russell Simmons and Kevin Liles to expand R&B and soul music through Def Jam's said genre-related roster following the successes of Montell Jordan and Case.

The label later garnered more success with other artists that include Musiq Soulchild, Kelly Price, Christina Milian, Aaron Soul, Terri Walker, Dru Hill, 112, Patti LaBelle and The Isley Brothers. In the spring of 2011, the label was consolidated into Def Jam, as the urban music industry began to change, so did the Def Jam label roster's multi-genre strategy, citing former artist Rihanna's success as the reason for the downfall of Def Soul.

== History ==
Capitalizing on the successes of Montell Jordan's "This Is How We Do It" in 1995 and Case's self-titled debut album in 1996, Def Jam co-founder Russell Simmons and then-vice president Kevin Liles teamed up to form Def Soul Records, to expand the label's R&B roster. The first release from the label shortly after its formation was Jordan's second album, More..., which came on August 27, 1996, two weeks after Case's debut. Both albums were certified gold.

Then came trio Playa, whose single "Cheers 2 U" (1998) cracked the top ten of the Billboard Hot R&B/Hip-Hop Songs chart. After appearing on the How to Be a Player soundtrack (1997) with the Foxy Brown-assisted "I Gotta Know", the group was greenlit to develop their debut album for Def Soul. Their album, also titled Cheers 2 U. Despite the building hype, the album did not chart perfectly on Billboard, debuting at number eighty-nine on the Billboard 200. It was later overshadowed a week later by Jordan's third follow-up, Let's Ride, which made the top ten of the Top R&B/Hip-Hop Albums chart and (like its predecessor) went gold. The title track gained the album some notoriety, due to No Limit Records labelmates and brothers Master P and Silkk the Shocker delivering their verses.

On the same day as the Columbine High School massacre in 1999, Case returned from his three-year hiatus with Personal Conversation, which (also like its predecessor) went gold and managed to embrace the top forty of the Billboard 200. Its single, "Happily Ever After", gained moderate airplay. That same year, Def Jam's parent label, PolyGram, was acquired by Seagram and its music division was later merged with MCA-related record labels to centralize the Universal Music Group. With this came the folding of Island Black Music, causing the transitioning of Island Records' R&B artist division into Def Soul. The artists under Island that were moved to this label included Dru Hill and Kelly Price. Following next was the creation of The Island Def Jam Music Group.

After the folding of Island Black into Def Soul and the UMG creation of IDJMG, Def Soul began to revamp their success with Jordan's Get It On... Tonite in November. While the title track provided success at number four on the Billboard Hot 100, the album itself didn't perform well as Jordan's previous three, despite being his second gold-seller. That same month, Dru Hill leader Sisqó's solo debut, Unleash the Dragon, started to take off. Having debuted at number two on the Billboard 200 and going platinum the following year. Extended success came from its singles, "Got to Get It", the number-one "Incomplete" and "Thong Song". "Thong Song", however, was the one that gained more success than the previous two, despite being number three on the Hot 100.

Summer 2000 saw the release of Kelly Price's sophomore album and her first under Def Soul, Mirror Mirror, which managed to gain the top three of Billboard's R&B album chart and go gold. It was solidified by the singles, "You Should Have Told Me" and "Love Sets You Free"; the latter colliding fellow Def Soul acts Case, Montell Jordan, Dru Hill, Playa, Kandice Love and LovHer together as Price's "friends". Following up was the soundtrack to Nutty Professor II: The Klumps, which made number one on the R&B chart and went platinum. The soundtrack helped to make way for Philadelphia soul artist Musiq Soulchild's career after his track, "Just Friends (Sunny)", which came on the soundtrack, became a radio hit. Later that November, Musiq released his debut album, Aijuswanaseing, which made the near-bottom of the top thirty section of the Billboard 200, but managed to go gold two months after.

Throughout 2001, only three albums were released under Def Soul: Case's Open Letter that April, Sisqó's Return of Dragon in June and Price's One Love, a Christmas album which came out that November. Originally, Christina Milian, who was last featured on Ja Rule's "Between Me and You" (2000), was supposed to release her self-titled debut studio album jointly through Def Soul and Irv Gotti's Murder Inc. Records on September 25, 2001, but due to the September 11 attacks, the album's American release was cancelled and postponed for international release on October 9.

In 2002, the label's vigilance was declining. Jordan left Def Soul after his eponymous fifth album failed to chart on Billboard. Aaron Soul, who previously scored a U.K. hit with "Ring, Ring, Ring", also had internal conflict with Def Soul as so Jonell regarding the delaying of their albums. 3rd Storee lost their deal with Def Soul after their album, Get with Me, failed to perform properly. Besides that, Musiq continued on his success with his sophomore album, Juslisen, becoming his first and also, Def Soul's first, number-one album on the Billboard 200. Not long after that, Dru Hill began work on their comeback album, Dru World Order, after four years of inactivity. It was released that November, but didn't match the success as the group's previous works.

2003 saw a huge dwindle within the division as LovHer and Jonell were dropped from the label. Terri Walker's untitled debut also didn't chart well on the UK Albums chart at number one-hundred eighteen despite going gold and having positive feedback from critics. As Walker suffered downhill failure, Kelly Price also faced similar problems as her third album, Priceless, also failed to match the successes of her previous two albums. She left the label in 2005 following serious issues. Former Bad Boy quartet 112 joined Def Soul after a falling out with founder Sean "Diddy" Combs. December saw the releases of 112's Hot & Wet and Musiq's Soulstar. Both albums also failed to garner commercial notoriety despite having peaked within the top five of the Billboard R&B album chart and going gold. The following year, Def Soul and Mama's Boys Music released the soundtrack to the comedy, Johnson Family Vacation, featuring the single, "Shoulda Known Betta" by Case. He left the label sometime the same year after the continued delaying of his planned fourth studio album. May commenced the release of Patti LaBelle's Timeless Journey which became a top five R&B album on the chart, due to the success of its single, "New Day".

Around 2005, 112 released their fifth album, Pleasure & Pain, which failed to meet the commercial success as their four projects. Soon after, 112 were released from the division after the album's release. LaBelle released Classic Moments under the Def Soul Classics imprint, but soon left the label after she accused then-vice president of Def Jam, L.A. Reid of misconduct. As 2006 came, Def Soul began to die down. Despite the release of The Isley Brothers' Baby Makin' Music in May and it charting at number five on the Billboard 200, the label still hasn't rebuilt fanfare. Also in 2006, Musiq Soulchild was let go from Def Soul, due to a de facto label trade between Def Jam and Atlantic Records; taking Musiq to Atlantic and switching Fabolous to Def Jam.

Only two Christmas albums commenced on Def Soul in late 2007, LaBelle's Miss Patti's Christmas and the Isley Brothers' I'll Be Home for Christmas. The following two years came without activity from the label. Many outlets and social media users were concerned that fellow R&B acts Ne-Yo, Rihanna, Jeremih and Chrisette Michele's successful careers at parent label Def Jam were what caused Def Soul Records to fall down, besides the aforementioned four not being signed to this division. Then, in November 2010, Ronald Isley released his comeback solo album following his prison release, Mr. I. This was the final release under the Def Soul imprint; in May 2011, Def Soul was finally folded into Def Jam Records, taking the rest of its remaining roster with it and consolidating all of Def Jam's artist roster of various genres together.

Recently, as of December 2021, there has been an official playlist on Spotify by Def Jam, using the label's name, mixing the label's singles with that of recent Def Jam R&B songs following the shutdown.

== Artist roster ==
- Montell Jordan (1996–2003)
- Case (1996–2004)
- Playa (1997–2002)
- Musiq Soulchild (1998–2006)
- Kandice Love (1998–2002)
- Dru Hill (1999–2003)
- Sisqó (1999–2003)
- Kelly Price (1999–2004)
- LovHer (1999–2003)
- Aaries (2000–2005)
- Aaron Soul (2000–2002)
- Jonell (2000–2003)
- Terri Walker (2001–2005)
- Christina Milian (2001–2003)
- 3rd Storee (2001–2002)
- 112 (2002–2006)
- K. Fox (2002–2005)
- Patti LaBelle (2003–2006; 2007–2008)
- The Isley Brothers (2005–2011)

== Def Soul Classics ==
Def Soul Classics
- Parent company: Universal Music Group
- Founded: 2004; 22 years ago
- Defunct: 2011
- Status: Folded
- Distributors: Def Soul/Def Jam Recordings (United States); Universal Music Enterprises (reissues)
- Genre: Contemporary R&B; soul; greatest hits
- Country of origin: United States

Def Soul Classics was a greatest hits branch of Def Soul Records, complimenting on re-releases or greatest hits projects released under the division.

The first release under the Def Soul Classics branch despite the name was Patti LaBelle's Timeless Journey on May 4, 2004. A year later, the first greatest hits compilation under Def Soul Classics, Dru Hill's Hits was released that October.

In 2005, Def Soul Classics released LaBelle's Classic Moments, followed up by the Isley Brothers' Baby Makin' Music in May 2006. The Classics branch also released two Christmas albums towards the end of 2007, Isley's I'll Be Home for Christmas and LaBelle's Miss Patti's Christmas.

The final release under the Classics branch was Ronald Isley's solo album, Mr I. in 2010. Then, as with the entirety of Def Soul Records, this label was also folded into Def Jam.
