= Grenique =

American singer-songwriter

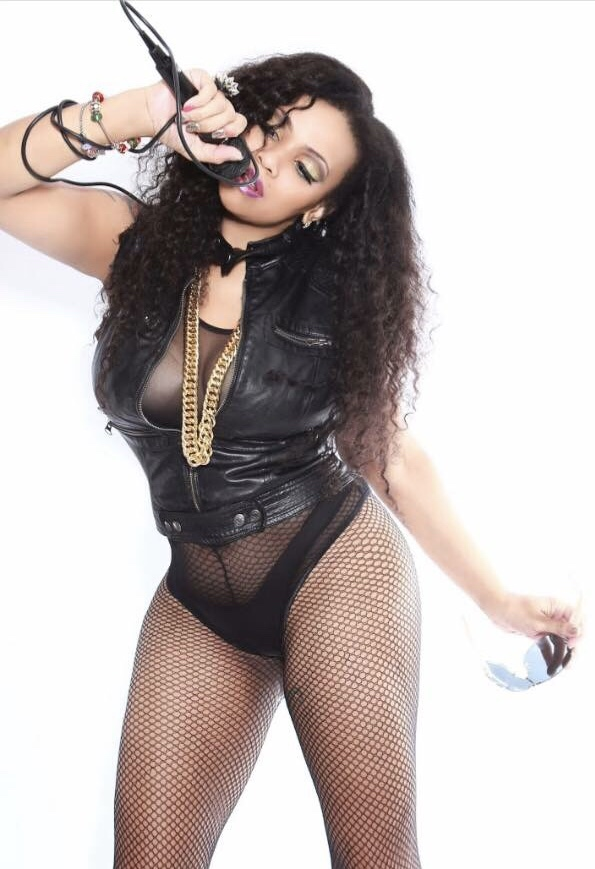

Background information
- Born: Grenique Roshawn Harper; Landover, Maryland, U.S.
- Genres: R&B
- Occupations: Singer; songwriter
- Instrument: Vocals
- Years active: 1998–present
- Labels: Motown; New Era Soul

Grenique Roshawn Harper (born November 13), simply known as Grenique (/ɡrəˈniːk/ grə-NEEK) is an American R&B soul singer.

== Early life ==
Her mother was a poet and her dad was a singer. Her parents gave her the name "Grenique" because her dad name was Greg and her mom thought she would be unique. She grew up listening to Chaka Khan, Cameo, Average White Band, Minnie Riperton, Phyllis Hyman, Sarah Vaughan and Ella Fitzgerald.

== Career ==
In 1998 her song "Disco" which is on her debut album appeared on the Rush Hour movie soundtrack. Two weeks before her 22nd birthday Kedar Massenberg the president of Motown alongside Chico DeBarge signed her to Motown. She released her debut album entitled "Black Butterfly" the lead single was Should I, The album made it to #49 on the Billboard Top R&B Hip-Hop Chart and 17 on the Heatseekers album chart as well. She gave background vocals on Alyson Williams album "It's About Time" and later on in 2008 Grenique co-written The Game song "Game's Pain".

In 2025, Grenique released her sophomore album, When Butterflies Become Unicorns on Raheem DeVaughn's label, New Era Soul.

== Discography ==
=== Studio albums ===
Title	Album details	Peak chart positions	
Title	Album details	US R&B	Heatseekers Albums
Black Butterfly	Released: June 22, 1999; Label: Motown; Format: CD, digital download	49	17
When Butterflies Become Unicorns	Released: August 1, 2025; Label: New Era Soul, UnitedMasters; Format: digital download		
