= Christmas in Baltimore =

EP by Dru Hill
- Released: November 24, 2017 (Release history)
- Recorded: Early November 2017
- Genre: R&B
- Length: 31:51
- Labels: Dru Hill, LLC / EMPIRE
- Producers: Troy Taylor, Dru Hill and Kevin Peck

Dru Hill chronology
| InDRUpendence Day (2010) | Christmas in Baltimore (2017) |

Singles from Christmas in Baltimore
- 1. "Favorite Time of Year" Released: November 24, 2017

Christmas in Baltimore is the first EP by American R&B group Dru Hill, released on November 24, 2017 under Dru Hill, LLC and EMPIRE. The members of Dru Hill were only in the studio for a week to produce this album in time the holidays. The album featured the same members as their previous album, InDRUpendence Day. The album released one single: "Favorite Time of Year". Music videos for "Favorite Time of Year" and "T'is the Season" were produced.

== Background ==
The album was confirmed in early November, 2017. The album was recorded in eight days. The title is a nod to their hometown of Baltimore, Maryland.

"We've always wanted to do a Christmas album, and we knew our fans had been waiting," the group added. "This year, it just all came together and we decided to invite everybody in for that authentic Baltimore holiday experience... you won't find another Christmas album like this, we guarantee it."

=== Sound ===
Dru Hill delivered their signature vocals over a mixture of both slow jams and mid-tempo songs.

== Release and promotion ==
Christmas in Baltimore was released on November 24, 2017, with their single "Favorite Time of Year". The group made various TV and social media appearances to promote the album.

== Music Videos ==
Favorite Time of Year is directed by Don Trunk and published on December 21, 2017, via YouTube. T'is The Season is directed by Jack Thriller and published through YouTube on December 28, 2017.

== Track listing ==
| No. | Title | Producer(s) | Length |
|---|---|---|---|
| 1. | "Intro" | Troy Taylor, Jason Cathey | 0:48 |
| 2. | "Favorite Time of Year" | Troy Taylor, Jason Cathey | 3:36 |
| 3. | "This Christmas" | Troy Taylor | 3:25 |
| 4. | "Get Away" | Troy Taylor | 3:35 |
| 5. | "No Holiday" | Troy Taylor | 3:44 |
| 6. | "Fireplace" | Troy Taylor | 3:42 |
| 7. | "T'is the Season" | Troy Taylor | 3:44 |
| 8. | "Underneath the Mistletoe" | Troy Taylor | 3:15 |
| 9. | "Silent Night" | Troy Taylor | 6:02 |

== Release history ==
| Region | Date | Label | Format |
|---|---|---|---|
| Worldwide | November 24, 2017 | EMPIRE | Download |
