= Rush Hour (soundtrack) =

1998 soundtrack album for the film Rush Hour

Def Jam's Rush Hour Soundtrack

Soundtrack album by various artists
- Released: September 15, 1998
- Recorded: 1997–98
- Genres: Hip hop; R&B
- Length: 73:47
- Label: Rush Associated Labels
- Producers: Lyor Cohen (exec.); Brett Ratner (exec.); Kedar Massenburg (exec.); Bert Price; Curt Gowdy; Dame Grease; Darrell "Digga" Branch; Darryl Pearson; Daven "Prestige" Vanderpool; DJ S&S; Irv Gotti; Joe; Jon B.; Lil' Rob; Nokio the N-Tity; Quinton "Black" Banks; Rick "Dutch" Cousin; Rob Fusari; Soopafly; Vada Nobles; Vincent Herbert; Warryn Campbell

Singles from Def Jam's Rush Hour Soundtrack
- 1. "How Deep Is Your Love" Released: June 23, 1998; 2. "Can I Get A..." Released: September 1, 1998; 3. "Faded Pictures" Released: 1998; 4. "Nasty Girl" Released: 1998; 5. "You'll Never Miss Me ('Til I'm Gone)" Released: 1998

Professional ratings
Review scores
Source	Rating
AllMusic	2.5/5 stars

Def Jam's Rush Hour Soundtrack is the soundtrack to Brett Ratner's 1998 action comedy film Rush Hour. It was released on September 15, 1998, through Rush Associated Labels and consisted of hip hop and R&B music. The soundtrack was a huge success, peaking at 5 on the Billboard 200 and 2 on the Top R&B/Hip-Hop Albums, and spawned the number 1 single "How Deep Is Your Love". The soundtrack was certified Gold by the Recording Industry Association of America on October 15, 1998, and platinum on January 21, 1999.

== Track listing ==
No.	Title	Writer(s)	Producer(s)	Length
1.	"Never Touch a Black Man's Radio (Skit)" (Chris Tucker)			0:16
2.	"How Deep Is Your Love" (Dru Hill and Redman)	Mark Andrews; Reginald Noble; Richard Cousins; Tamir Ruffin; Warryn Campbell	Rick "Dutch" Cousin; Nokio the N-Tity; Warryn Campbell	4:10
3.	"Faded Pictures" (Case and Joe)	Joseph Thomas; Joshua Thompson	Joe	3:52
4.	"Can I Get A..." (Jay-Z, Amil and Ja Rule)	Shawn Carter; Jeffrey Atkins; Irving Lorenzo; Robert Mays	Irv Gotti; Lil' Rob	5:11
5.	"Jackie Chan Kicks Ass (Skit)" (Jackie Chan)			0:09
6.	"And You Don't Stop" (Wu-Tang Clan)	Clifford Smith; Elgin Turner; Patrick Charles; Russell Jones; Damon Blackmon	Dame Grease	3:41
7.	"Bitch Betta Have My Money" (Ja Rule)	Atkins; Lorenzo; Mays	Irv Gotti; Lil' Rob	3:28
8.	"Is This Weed...Cigaweed (Skit)" (Chris Tucker)			0:25
9.	"Disco" (Grenique)	Grenique Roshawn Harper; Vada J. Nobles; Rasheem Sharrief Pugh; Tejumold Ramone Newton	Vada Nobles	4:35
10.	"Blow Shit up...FBI Wants You (Skit)" (Chris Tucker and Philip Baker Hall)			0:32
11.	"Impress the Kid" (Slick Rick)	Ricky Martin Lloyd Walters; S. Everett	DJ S&S	4:11
12.	"If I Die Tonight" (Montell Jordan, Monifah and Flesh-n-Bone)	Montell Barnett; Rob Fusari; Vincent Herbert; Mary Brown	Rob Fusari; Vincent Herbert	4:51
13.	"Glad That We Loved" (Jon B.)	Jonathan David Buck; Eric Jackson	Jon B.	4:44
14.	"I'll Be on a Big FBI Case" (Chris Tucker)			0:06
15.	"Terror Squadians" (Terror Squad)	John Eaddy; Christopher Rios; Felix Delgado; Joseph Cartagena; Richard Perez; Richard Pimentel	Curt Gowdy	5:03
16.	"Please Tell Me You Speak English..." (Chris Tucker)			0:12
17.	"Way Too Crazy" (Tray Deee, Jayo Felony and Daz Dillinger)	Tracy Davis; James Savage; Delmar Drew Arnaud; Priest Brooks	Soopafly	4:25
18.	"N.B.C." (Charli Baltimore, Cam'ron and Noreaga)	Tiffany Lane; Cameron Giles; Victor Santiago; Darrell Branch	Darrell "Digga" Branch; Lance 'Un' Rivera (co.)	4:02
19.	"You'll Never Miss Me ('Til I'm Gone)" (Terry Dexter)	Andrews; Darryl Pearson	Darryl Pearson	4:32
20.	"Nasty Girl" (Kasino, Nite & Day)	Kimani Davis; Gasner Allan Hughes; Tonyatta P. Martinez; Daven Paul Vanderpool; Ronald Kalstein; James Brown	Prestige	3:44
21.	"No Love" (Imajin)	Bert Price; Lionel Bussey	Bert Price	4:12
22.	"I'm Michael Jackson, You Tito (Skit)" (Chris Tucker and Jackie Chan)			0:17
23.	"Tell the Feds" (Too Short)	Todd Shaw; Quinton Banks	Quinton "Black" Banks	5:19
24.	"Rush Hour (Main Title Theme)" (Lalo Schifrin)			1:17
25.	"Take This Badge and Shove It" (Chris Tucker)			0:33
Total length:				1:13:47

== Rush Hour (Original Film Score) ==
Rush Hour (Original Film Score)

Soundtrack album by Lalo Schifrin
- Released: October 13, 1998
- Recorded: August 3–5, 1998
- Studios: Newman Scoring Stage (Hollywood, California)
- Length: 47:22
- Label: Aleph Records
- Producers: Donna Schifrin (exec.); Brett Ratner; Lalo Schifrin

Lalo Schifrin chronology
Metamorphosis: Jazz Meets the Symphony #4 (1998)	Rush Hour (Original Film Score) (1998)	Carlos Saura's Tango (Original Motion Picture Soundtrack) (1998)

Professional ratings
Review scores
Source	Rating
AllMusic	3/5 stars

Rush Hour (Original Film Score) is the original film score album of Brett Ratner's 1998 action comedy film Rush Hour composed and conducted by Lalo Schifrin. It was released on October 13, 1998, through Aleph Records. Recording sessions took place at Newman Scoring Stage at 20th Century Fox Studios in Hollywood. Production was handled by Schifrin and Ratner with Donna Schifrin serving as executive producer. The album was nominated for Best Instrumental Composition Written for a Motion Picture or for Television at the 41st Annual Grammy Awards.

=== Track listing ===
All music is composed by Lalo Schifrin.

No.	Title	Length
1.	"Rush Hour (Main Title)"	2:02
2.	"Fight at the Harbor"	1:20
3.	"Soo Yung's Theme"	3:17
4.	"Soo Yung's Abduction"	0:55
5.	"Lee Arrives in L.A."	1:29
6.	"Jumping the Bus"	2:07
7.	"Won Ton for Two"	1:50
8.	"Explosive Situation"	1:19
9.	"Lee at the Mansion"	2:18
10.	"Restaurant Poison"	2:15
11.	"Battle at Juntao's"	2:20
12.	"Greasy Egg Rolls"	0:56
13.	"Chasing Sang"	2:36
14.	"$50 Million Ransom"	1:51
15.	"On Juntao's Heels"	4:09
16.	"Asian Art Convention"	1:48
17.	"Lee's Sadness"	1:47
18.	"High Tension"	2:29
19.	"Sweet and Sour"	2:09
20.	"Chinese Street Music"	2:05
21.	"Carter Chases Clive"	1:32
22.	"The British Menace"	1:26
23.	"Rush Hour (End Titles)"	3:24
Total length:		47:22

== Charts ==
=== Weekly charts ===
Chart (1998–99)	Peak position
Austrian Albums (Ö3 Austria)	49
German Albums (Offizielle Top 100)	44
New Zealand Albums (RMNZ)	17
US Billboard 200	5
US Top R&B/Hip-Hop Albums (Billboard)	2

=== Year-end charts ===
Chart (1998)	Position
US Billboard 200	113
US Top R&B/Hip-Hop Albums (Billboard)	50

Chart (1999)	Position
US Billboard 200	144
US Top R&B/Hip-Hop Albums (Billboard)	78

== Certifications ==
Region	Certification	Certified units/sales
Canada (Music Canada)	Gold	50,000^{^}
United Kingdom (BPI)	Gold	100,000^{^}
United States (RIAA)	Platinum	1,000,000^{^}
^{^} Shipments figures based on certification alone.
