= I Should Be... =

Single by Dru Hill

from the album Dru World Order
- Released: December 23, 2002
- Genre: R&B, hip hop soul
- Length: 4:45
- Label: Def Soul
- Songwriter(s): Jeriel Askew, Christo Featherstone, Justin Featherstone, Matthew Featherstone, Alonzo Joyner
- Producer(s): The Featherstones

Dru Hill singles chronology
"You Are Everything" (1999)	"I Should Be..." (2002)	"I Love You" (2003)

Music video
- "I Should Be..." on YouTube

"I Should Be..." is the first single from Dru Hill's 2002 third album, Dru World Order. The single peaked at #25 on the Billboard Hot 100 and #6 on the R&B chart. The song stayed on the Hot 100 chart for a total of 17 weeks.

== Music video ==
The music video was directed by Chris Robinson.

== Track listing ==
7" vinyl single
No.	Title	Length
1.	"I Should Be..."	4:58
2.	"I Should Be..."	4:58

US promo single
No.	Title	Length
1.	"I Should Be... (Radio)"	4:23
2.	"I Should Be... (Instrumental)"	4:58
3.	"I Should Be... (Call Out Research Hook)"	--

== Charts ==
=== Weekly charts ===
Chart (2003)	Peak position
US Billboard Hot 100	25
US Hot R&B/Hip-Hop Songs (Billboard)	6
US Rhythmic (Billboard)	39

=== Year-end charts ===
Chart (2003)	Position
US Hot R&B/Hip-Hop Songs (Billboard)	51
