= How Deep Is Your Love (Dru Hill song) =

1998 single by Dru Hill

Single by Dru Hill featuring Redman

from the album Enter the Dru and Rush Hour (soundtrack)
- Released: September 22, 1998
- Recorded: 1998
- Genre: R&B; hip hop
- Length: 3:58
- Label: Island
- Songwriters: Rick Cousin; Tamir Ruffin; Warryn Campbell; Mark Andrews; Reggie Noble
- Producers: Warryn Campbell; Dutch; Nokio

Dru Hill singles chronology
"We're Not Making Love No More" (1997)	"How Deep Is Your Love" (1998)	"These Are the Times" (1998)

Redman singles chronology
"Made It Back" (1998)	"How Deep Is Your Love" (1998)	"I'll Bee Dat!" (1998)

Music video
- "How Deep Is Your Love" on YouTube

"How Deep Is Your Love" is an R&B single by group Dru Hill. It is the first single from the group's second album, Enter the Dru. The song was released on September 22, 1998. It spent three weeks at number-one on the US R&B chart, and peaked at number three on the US Billboard Hot 100 chart. The song, in its single version with rapper Redman, was also used in the end credits and is featured on the soundtrack to the 1998 film Rush Hour. To date, this is Dru Hill's highest-charting hit.

== Music video ==
The music video was directed by Brett Ratner and was shot on top of Hopewell Centre in Wan Chai, Hong Kong and features clips from Rush Hour. Redman's verse is cut from both the group's album and the video version as he does not appear in the video.

== Track listing ==
UK CD single
No.	Title	Length
1.	"How Deep Is Your Love"	4:13
2.	"How Deep Is Your Love (LP Version)"	4:07
3.	"How Deep Is Your Love (Instrumental)"	4:09

US 12" single Side A

1. "How Deep Is Your Love" – 4:03
2. "How Deep Is Your Love" (featuring Redman) – 3:58
3. "How Deep Is Your Love" (Instrumental) – 4:05

Side B

1. "Beauty"/"What Do I Do with the Love"/"You Are Everything" (snippets) – 3:35
2. "How Deep Is Your Love" (a cappella) (featuring Redman) – 3:58

== Charts and certifications ==
=== Weekly charts ===
Chart (1998)	Peak position
Australia (ARIA)	13
Austria (Ö3 Austria Top 40)	29
Belgium (Ultratop 50 Flanders)	20
Belgium (Ultratop 50 Wallonia)	19
Canada Top Singles (RPM)	74
Canada Dance/Urban (RPM)	1
Europe (European Hot 100 Singles)	27
France (SNEP)	39
Germany (GfK)	8
Ireland (IRMA)	27
Netherlands (Dutch Top 40)	7
Netherlands (Single Top 100)	6
New Zealand (Recorded Music NZ)	26
Scottish Singles Sales (Official Charts)	45
Sweden (Sverigetopplistan)	4
Switzerland (Schweizer Hitparade)	10
UK Singles (Official Charts Company)	9
UK Dance (Official Charts)	10
UK Hip Hop/R&B (Official Charts)	1
US Billboard Hot 100	3
US Hot R&B/Hip-Hop Songs (Billboard)	1
US Rhythmic Airplay (Billboard)	1

=== Year-end charts ===
Chart (1998)	Position
Germany (Official German Charts)	85
Netherlands (Dutch Top 40)	91
Netherlands (Single Top 100)	94
UK Urban (Music Week)	35
US Billboard Hot 100	71
US Hot R&B/Hip-Hop Songs (Billboard)	45
Chart (1999)	Position
Australia (ARIA)	77
Netherlands (Dutch Top 40)	120
Sweden (Sverigetopplistan)	65

=== Certifications ===
Region	Certification	Certified units/sales
Australia (ARIA)	Gold	35,000^{^}
Germany (BVMI)	Gold	250,000^{^}
Sweden (GLF)	Gold	15,000^{^}
United Kingdom (BPI)	Silver	200,000^{‡}
United States (RIAA)	Gold	600,000
^{^} Shipments figures based on certification alone.^{‡} Sales+streaming figures based on certification alone.

== See also ==
- List of number-one R&B singles of 1998 (U.S.)
