= Soul Food (soundtrack) =

1997 soundtrack album

Soundtrack album by Various artists
- Released: September 16, 1997
- Genres: R&B; hip hop
- Length: 56:35
- Label: LaFace
- Producer: Various artists

Singles from Soul Food
- 1. "What About Us?" Released: August 12, 1997; 2. "In Due Time" Released: September 16, 1997; 3. "Boys and Girls" Released: October 1997; 4. "A Song for Mama" Released: November 11, 1997 (airplay) November 25, 1997; 5. "We're Not Making Love No More" Released: November 25, 1997; 6. "I Care 'Bout You" Released: December 3, 1997

Professional ratings
Review scores
Source	Rating
Allmusic	link

Soul Food is the soundtrack to the 1997 film of the same name. It was released on September 16, 1997, through LaFace Records and mainly consisted of R&B music with some hip hop music. The soundtrack was a success, peaking at number 4 on the Billboard 200 and number 1 on the Top R&B/Hip-Hop Albums chart and was certified double Multi-Platinum on February 17, 1998. Four singles charted on the Billboard Hot 100: "I Care 'Bout You" , "What About Us?" by Total, "We're Not Making Love No More" by Dru Hill, and "A Song for Mama" by Boyz II Men, the latter of which was a number 1 R&B single. The soundtrack was also noted for the fictional quintet group Milestone, consisting of K-Ci & JoJo (of Jodeci), Babyface and his brothers, Kevon and Melvin Edmonds (of After 7), who all came together once for their single and cameo appearance in the film.

== Track listing ==
Soul Food track listing
No.	Title	Writer(s)	Artist	Length
1.	"A Song for Mama"	Babyface	Boyz II Men	5:01
2.	"Call Me (Hip Hop Mix)" (ft. Jay-Z)	Teddy Riley, Chauncey Hannibal (co.)	BLACKstreet	4:28
3.	"I Care 'Bout You"	Babyface	Milestone	4:35
4.	"What About Us?" (ft. Missy "Misdemeanor" Elliott and Timbaland)	Timbaland	Total	4:22
5.	"Don’t Stop What You’re Doing" (ft. Lil’ Kim)	Ron “Amen-Ra” Lawrence, Sean “Puffy” Combs	Puff Daddy	5:11
6.	"We're Not Making Love No More"	Babyface, Daryl Simmons	Dru Hill	4:50
7.	"Baby I"	Babyface	Tenderoni	4:12
8.	"Let’s Do It Again"	Jermaine Dupri, Manuel Seal (co.)	Xscape	3:15
9.	"In Due Time" (ft. CeeLo Green)	OutKast	Outkast	3:53
10.	"Slow Jam"	Babyface	Usher & Monica	4:43
11.	"Boys and Girls"	Babyface, Raphael Saadiq (co.)	Tony! Toni! Toné!	4:16
12.	"You Are the Man"	Babyface	En Vogue	4:13
13.	"September"	Maurice White	Earth, Wind & Fire	3:36
Total length:				56:35

== Charts ==
=== Weekly charts ===
Weekly chart performance for Soul Food
Chart (1997–1998)	Peak position
Australian Albums (ARIA)	86
Canadian R&B Albums (SoundScan)	4
US Billboard 200	4
US Top R&B/Hip-Hop Albums (Billboard)	1

=== Year-end charts ===
1997 year-end chart performance for Soul Food
Chart (1997)	Position
Canadian Albums (SoundScan)	96
Canadian R&B Albums (SoundScan)	15
US Billboard 200	81
US Top R&B/Hip-Hop Albums (Billboard)	27

1998 year-end chart performance for Soul Food
Chart (1998)	Position
Canadian R&B Albums (SoundScan)	40
US Billboard 200	73
US Top R&B/Hip-Hop Albums (Billboard)	31

== Certifications ==
Certifications for Soul Food
Region	Certification	Certified units/sales
Canada (Music Canada)	Gold	50,000^{^}
United States (RIAA)	2× Platinum	2,000,000^{^}
^{^} Shipments figures based on certification alone.

== See also ==
- List of Billboard number-one R&B albums of 1997
