= These Are the Times =

1998 single by Dru Hill

"These Are The Times"

Single by Dru Hill

from the album Enter the Dru
- Released: November 17, 1998
- Recorded: 1997
- Genre: R&B
- Length: 4:08
- Label: Island
- Songwriter(s): Kenneth Edmonds; Damon Thomas
- Producer(s): Babyface; Damon Thomas

Dru Hill singles chronology
"How Deep Is Your Love" (1998)	"These Are The Times" (1998)	"Wild Wild West" (1999)

Music video
- "These Are The Times" on YouTube

"These Are The Times" is the second single released from Dru Hill's second album, Enter the Dru. The single reached number 21 on the Hot 100 and number 5 on the R&B chart, staying on the chart for 21 weeks. The song reached the UK top 5, peaking at number 4, being Dru Hill's highest and last charting hit in that country to date.

== Music video ==
The music video was directed by Bille Woodruff in 1998. It was inspired by the film The Man in the Iron Mask. Sisqó played both the good twin and the evil twin and Jazz, Woody and Nokio played the Musketeers. Actress Lark Voorhies appears in the video as Sisqó's love interest. It was filmed at the Greystone Mansion in LA.

== Track listing ==
US CD single
No.	Title	Length
1.	"These Are The Times"	4:08
2.	"These Are The Times (Instrumental)"	4:07
3.	"The Love We Had (Stays On My Mind)/Beauty/What Do I Do With The Love (Snippets)"	4:00

Germany CD single
No.	Title	Length
1.	"These Are The Times"	4:08
2.	"These Are The Times (Scooterpella Mix)"	4:07
3.	"How Deep Is Your Love (Soul Extended Club Mix)"	4:16
4.	"How Deep Is Your Love (Soul Groove Mix)"	4:12

UK CD single
No.	Title	Length
1.	"These Are The Times"	4:08
2.	"Theses Are The Times (Instrumental)"	4:08
3.	"Tell Me (D'Influence Mix)"	3:48

== Charts ==
=== Weekly charts ===
Chart (1998–1999)	Peak position
Australia (ARIA)	22
Canada (Nielsen SoundScan)	11
Germany (GfK)	46
New Zealand (Recorded Music NZ)	36
Scotland (OCC)	26
UK Singles (OCC)	4
UK Hip Hop/R&B (OCC)	1
US Billboard Hot 100	21
US Hot R&B/Hip-Hop Songs (Billboard)	5
US Rhythmic (Billboard)	6

=== Year-end charts ===
Chart (1999)	Position
UK Singles (OCC)	160
US Billboard Hot 100	66
US Hot R&B/Hip-Hop Singles & Tracks (Billboard)	29
