= We're Not Making Love No More =

Single by Dru Hill

from the album Soul Food (soundtrack)
- Released: November 25, 1997
- Genre: R&B
- Length: 4:54
- Label: LaFace
- Songwriter: Kenneth "Babyface" Edmonds
- Producers: Kenneth "Babyface" Edmonds; Daryl Simmons

Dru Hill singles chronology
"5 Steps" (1997)	"We're Not Making Love No More" (1997)	"How Deep Is Your Love" (1998)

Music video
- "We're Not Making Love No More" on YouTube

"We're Not Making Love No More" is a song performed by American contemporary R&B group Dru Hill, released as a single from the soundtrack to the film Soul Food. The song peaked at #13 on the Billboard Hot 100 and at #2 on the Billboard R&B chart.

The single was certified gold on December 23, 1997.

== Music video ==
The official music video for the song was directed by Christopher Erskin.

== Track listing ==
US CD single
No.	Title	Length
1.	"We're Not Making Love No More (Album Version)"	4:50
2.	"We're Not Making Love No More (Instrumental)"	4:54

== Credits and personnel ==
Credits adapted from the liner notes of the Soul Food Soundtrack.

- Dru Hill: vocals
- Babyface: writer, composer, producer, keyboards and drum programming, background vocals
- Daryl Simmons: producer
- Greg Phillinganes: piano
- Nathan East: bass
- Manny Marroquin and Paul Boutin: recording engineers
- Jon Gass: mix engineer
- Paul Boutin: assistant mix engineer
- Randy Walker: midi programming
- Ivy Skoff: production coordinator

== Charts ==
=== Weekly charts ===
Chart (1997–1998)	Peak position
Canada (Nielsen SoundScan)	35
New Zealand (Recorded Music NZ)	33
US Billboard Hot 100	13
US Hot R&B/Hip-Hop Songs (Billboard)	2
US Rhythmic Airplay (Billboard)	37

=== Year-end charts ===
Chart (1998)	Position
US Billboard Hot 100	56
US Hot R&B/Hip-Hop Songs (Billboard)	20

== Certifications ==
Region	Certification	Certified units/sales
United States (RIAA)	Gold	500,000^{^}
^{^} Shipments figures based on certification alone.
