= Unleash the Dragon =

Studio album by Sisqó
- Released: November 30, 1999
- Recorded: 1999
- Studio: Metalworks (Mississauga, Ontario)
- Genres: R&B; pop rap
- Length: 51:03
- Label: Def Soul
- Producers: Tim & Bob, Warryn Campbell, Al West, Baby Dave, Nokio the N-Tity, One Up Entertainment, The Co-Stars, Shep Crawford, Dru Hill, Dutch, N8 & Kiehl

Sisqó chronology
Unleash the Dragon (1999)	Return of Dragon (2001)

Singles from Unleash the Dragon
- 1. "Got to Get It" Released: November 2, 1999; 2. "Thong Song" Released: February 15, 2000; 3. "Incomplete" Released: July 25, 2000; 4. "Unleash the Dragon" Released: September 18, 2000

Unleash the Dragon is the debut solo studio album by American R&B singer Sisqó of Dru Hill, released on November 30, 1999, on Def Soul Records. Sisqó recorded the album during Dru Hill's hiatus. It includes the hit songs "Got to Get It", "Incomplete", and "Thong Song". Previously, Sisqo had been the lead singer of the group Dru Hill. Recorded by Island Records, the group released two albums certified platinum by the RIAA: Dru Hill (1996) and Enter the Dru (1998). In 2003, the album was certified quintuple platinum by the Recording Industry Association of America (RIAA) for shipment of five million copies in the United States.

The album also garnered Sisqó two American Music Award nominations for Favorite Soul/R&B Album and Favorite Soul/R&B Male Artist. In addition he received three nominations including Best New Artist and Best R&B Album at the 43rd Grammy Awards in 2001.

== Critical reception ==
Professional ratings
Review scores
Source	Rating
AllMusic	2.5/5 stars
Robert Christgau	(choice cut)
MTV Asia	7/10
Muzik	4/5 stars
Q	4/5 stars
Rolling Stone	(mixed)
The Source	(favorable)

AllMusic editor Michael Gallucci wrote that "loaded with whispered bedroom moans, which have become late-'90s R&B clichés, Unleash the Dragon is short on any real songs to justify the pointless replay of these familiar grooves [...] Once the beats – which borrow heavily from the contemporary R&B playbook – are programmed, there's little for Sisqó to do but coast along the grooves, with all the conviction and commitment of a soul robot."

== Track listing ==
Credits taken from the album's liner notes.

No.	Title	Writer(s)	Producer(s)	Length
1.	"Unleash the Dragon" (featuring Beanie Sigel)	Mark "Sisqó" Andrews; Dwight Grant; Rich Shelton; Loren Hill; Kevin Veney	Shelton; Hill; Veney	3:53
2.	"Got to Get It" (featuring Make It Hot)	Mark Andrews; Al West; Marquis Collins; James Travis	Sisqó; Al West	2:54
3.	"Is Love Enough" (featuring LovHer)	Andrews; Warryn Campbell; Donald DeGrate; Raymond E. Jones; Robert Jones	Campbell	4:33
4.	"2nite" (Interlude)	Tamir Ruffin	Nokio The N-Tity	1:21
5.	"How Can I Love U 2nite"	Ruffin; Phil Weatherspoon; Case Woodard	Nokio The N-Tity; Weatherspoon^{[a]}	5:08
6.	"Your Love Is Incredible"	Andrews; Vito Colapietro; Neely Dinkins; Noah Porter	The Co-Stars; Sisqó^{[b]}	4:10
7.	"So Sexual"	Andrews; Nathan "N8" Walton; Kiehl Owens; Tavia Ivey; Kenneth Edmonds	N8; Kiehl; Sisqó^{[b]}	3:58
8.	"Thong Song"	Andrews; Tim Kelley; Bob Robinson; Robi "Draco" Rosa; Desmond Child	Sisqó; Tim & Bob	4:16
9.	"Incomplete"	Montell Jordan; Shep Crawford	Crawford	4:34
10.	"Addicted"	Andrews; West	Sisqó; West	4:48
11.	"Dru World Order (Interlude)" (Dedicated to Dru Hill)	Andrews; Ruffin; James "Woody" Green; Larry "Jazz" Anthony	Sisqó; West	1:20
12.	"Enchantment Passing Through" (performed by Dru Hill)	Elton John; Tim Rice	Dru Hill	5:43
13.	"You Are Everything (Remix)" (Dru Hill featuring Ja Rule)	Andrews; Rick Cousin	Sisqó; Dutch; Sisqó^{[c]}; Baby Dave^{[c]}	4:16

Notes

- ^{^a} denotes co-producer
- ^{^b} denotes additional production
- ^{^c} signifies a remixer

Sample credits

- "Is Love Enough" contains an interpolation of "Cry for You", written by Donald DeGrate, Raymond E. Jones, and Robert Jones.
- "Thong Song" contains an interpolation of "Livin' la Vida Loca", written by Robi Rosa and Desmond Child.

== Personnel ==
- Sisqó – vocals, vocal producer (1–3, 5–10, 13), vocal arrangements (1–3, 5–10, 12, 13)
- Jarod Barnes – drums and percussion (12)
- Paul Boutin – engineer (7)
- Butter – additional background vocals (10)
- Vito Calapietro – engineer (6)
- The Co-Stars – instruments (6)
- Baby Dave – keyboards (10)
- CJ Davilla – engineer (1), Pro Tools (1, 2)
- Jae Dea – keyboards and bass (12)
- Bruce Dukov – violin (8)
- Mike Dy – assistant engineer (12)
- Kenneth "Babyface" Edmonds – arrangements, background vocals, and additional instruments (7)
- Jan Fairchild – engineer (1, 2, 5, 8–10, 12), Pro Tools (1, 2, 8), additional engineering (3), mixing (5)
- Jon Gass – mixing (7)
- Steve Hall – mastering
- Jason – assistant engineer (1, 10)
- Jazz – vocal arrangements (12)
- Anthony Jeffries – engineer (3)
- Shae Jones – background vocals (9)
- Montell Jordan – arrangements (9)
- Manny Marroquin – mixing (1–3, 6, 8–10)
- Victor McCoy – assistant engineer (8)
- Nate Morring – baby grand piano (12)
- Axel Niehaus – mixing (5)
- Kiehl Owens – drum programming and arrangements (7)
- Dave Pensado – mixing (12)
- Nathan "N8" Walton – background vocals, keyboards, and arrangements (7)

== Charts ==
=== Weekly charts ===
Chart (1999–2000)	Peak position
Australian Albums (ARIA)	28
Belgian Albums (Ultratop Flanders)	26
Belgian Albums (Ultratop Wallonia)	41
Canada Top Albums/CDs (RPM)	6
Canadian R&B Albums (Nielsen SoundScan)	5
Dutch Albums (Album Top 100)	9
European Top 100 Albums (Music & Media)	43
French Albums (SNEP)	27
German Albums (Offizielle Top 100)	54
Irish Albums (IRMA)	75
New Zealand Albums (RMNZ)	23
Norwegian Albums (VG-lista)	19
Scottish Albums (Official Charts)	47
Swedish Albums (Sverigetopplistan)	45
Swiss Albums (Schweizer Hitparade)	36
UK Albums (Official Charts)	15
UK R&B Albums (Official Charts)	3
US Billboard 200	2
US Top R&B/Hip-Hop Albums (Billboard)	2

=== Year-end charts ===
Chart (2000)	Position
Canadian Albums (Nielsen SoundScan)	55
Dutch Albums (MegaCharts)	85
French Albums (SNEP)	84
UK Albums (OCC)	71
US Billboard 200	12
US Top R&B/Hip-Hop Albums (Billboard)	4

== Certifications ==
Region	Certification	Certified units/sales
Australia (ARIA)	Gold	35,000^{^}
Canada (Music Canada)	2× Platinum	200,000^{^}
France (SNEP)	Gold	100,000^{*}
Germany (BVMI)	Gold	150,000^{^}
Netherlands (NVPI)	Gold	50,000^{^}
United Kingdom (BPI)	Gold	100,000^{^}
United States (RIAA)	5× Platinum	5,000,000^{^}
^{*} Sales figures based on certification alone.^{^} Shipments figures based on certification alone.
