= Enter the Dru =

Studio album by Dru Hill
- Released: October 27, 1998
- Recorded: 1998
- Studio: Larabee Studios (Los Angeles)
- Genre: R&B; hip hop soul
- Length: 66:01
- Label: Island
- Producer: Baby Dave, Babyface, Warryn Campbell, Dutch, David Foster, James "Woody" Green, Nokio the N-Tity, Guy Roche, Daryl Simmons, Sisqó, Ralph Stacy, Damon Thomas

Dru Hill chronology
Dru Hill (1996)	Enter the Dru (1998)	Dru World Order (2002)

Singles from Enter the Dru
- 1. "How Deep Is Your Love" Released: June 23, 1998; 2. "These Are the Times" Released: November 17, 1998; 3. "Beauty" Released: January 31, 1999; 4. "You Are Everything" Released: May 18, 1999

Enter the Dru is the second studio album from American R&B group Dru Hill. Released on October 27, 1998, it was the group's second and final album for Island Black Music, the urban music division of Island Records; Island was merged with Def Jam Recordings following a company merger in December the same year, as Dru Hill would later be transferred to Def Jam's Def Soul subsidiary.

The album's title was inspired by the Bruce Lee 1973 film, Enter the Dragon.

This is the first album that the group were credited as executive producers as all four members wrote and produced several of the songs. It released three singles, "How Deep Is Your Love", "These Are The Times" and "You Are Everything". The singles all had music videos released, but the music video for "You Are Everything" was a remix video, which featured rapper Ja Rule, and Woody did not appear in it due to him leaving the group in early 1999. The remix version was later featured on lead singer Sisqó's debut album, Unleash the Dragon, which was released that November.

Recording sessions for the album took place at Larabee Studios in Los Angeles. The album peaked at number two on both the Billboard 200 and Top R&B/Hip-Hop Albums charts. In May 1999, it was certified double-platinum in sales by the Recording Industry Association of America (RIAA), after exceeding 2,000,000 copies in the United States.

== Overview ==
The songs on the album are mainly performed by lead singer, Sisqó, who performs solo on four songs: "Real Freak", "How Deep Is Your Love", "This Is What We Do" and "One Good Reason". Jazz performs solo on "Holding You" and "I'll Be the One". Woody performs solo on "Angel". Nokio does not perform solo on any songs but he does get more lead vocals than on the group's eponymous debut album.

== Background ==
The album was recorded over a three-week span at Larabee Studios in Los Angeles during the early months of 1998. Group member James "Woody Rock" Green would leave the group soon after the release of the album to pursue a career as a gospel musician. The other members also went on to do solo albums, which forced the group to go on hiatus.

== Release and reception ==
Professional ratings
Review scores
Source	Rating
Allmusic	3.5/5 stars
Entertainment Weekly	C+
Los Angeles Times	4/4 stars
Rolling Stone	2/5 stars
Spin	(7/10)

The album peaked at number two on both the U.S. Billboard 200 and the R&B Albums chart. The album was certified gold in December 1998 and eventually recertified double-platinum by May 1999. Michael Gallucci of Allmusic gave the group and their second effort a favorable review, stating that "Dru Hill slice into the section of '90s soul music that crosses bedroom come-ons with classic street savvy (and nervy beats) without sounding at all whipped."

== Track listing ==
No.	Title	Writer(s)	Producer(s)	Length
1.	"Enter the Dru" (Interlude)	Mark Andrews; David Evans	Sisqó, Baby Dave	0:53
2.	"Real Freak" (featuring Chinky Brown Eyes)	Mark Andrews; David Evans	Sisqó, Baby Dave	3:34
3.	"How Deep Is Your Love"	Tamir Ruffin; Mark Andrews; Warryn Campbell	Dutch, Nokio The N-Tity, Warryn Campbell	4:03
4.	"This Is What We Do" (featuring Method Man)	Mark Andrews; Tamir Ruffin; Rick Cousin	Nokio The N-Tity, Dutch	4:21
5.	"Holding You"	Larry Anthony; Rick Cousin	Dutch, Jazz	4:28
6.	"I'm Wondering"	Tamir Ruffin; Warryn Campbell; Rick Cousin	Warryn Campbell, Nokio The N-Tity	4:17
7.	"You Are Everything"	Mark Andrews; Rick Cousin	Sisqó, Dutch	4:34
8.	"I'll Be The One"	Daryl Simmons	Daryl Simmons	4:26
9.	"Nowhere Without You" (Interlude)	Mark Andrews; James Green	Sisqó, Warryn Campbell	1:06
10.	"One Good Reason"	Ralph Stacy; Raphael Brown	Ralph Stacy, Nokio The N-Tity	4:15
11.	"Angel" (Interlude)	James Green; Warryn Campbell	Warryn Campbell, Woody	1:33
12.	"Angel"	James Green; Warryn Campbell	Warryn Campbell, Woody, Nokio The N-Tity	4:24
13.	"What Do I Do With The Love"	Diane Warren	David Foster, Guy Roche, Nokio The N-Tity	4:46
14.	"Beauty"	Tamir Ruffin; Guy Roche; Phil Weatherspoon	Guy Roche, Nokio The N-Tity	4:32
15.	"These Are the Times"	Kenneth Edmonds; Damon Thomas	Babyface, Damon Thomas	4:09
16.	"The Love We Had (Stays On My Mind)"	Terry Callier; Larry Wade	Daryl Simmons	5:35
17.	"What Are We Gonna Do"	Tamir Ruffin; Ralph Cousin; Shep Crawford	Nokio The N-Tity, Dutch	5:06

== Charts ==
=== Weekly charts ===
Weekly chart performance for Enter the Dru
Chart (1998)	Peak position
Australian Albums (ARIA Charts)	76
Canadian Albums (Billboard)	11
Canadian R&B Albums (SoundScan)	2
Dutch Albums (Album Top 100)	27
German Albums (Offizielle Top 100)	19
UK Albums (OCC)	42
UK R&B Albums (OCC)	2
US Billboard 200	2
US Top R&B/Hip-Hop Albums (Billboard)	2

=== Year-end charts ===
1998 year-end chart performance for Enter the Dru
Chart (1998)	Position
Canadian Albums (SoundScan)	152
Canadian R&B Albums (SoundScan)	22
US Top R&B/Hip-Hop Albums (Billboard)	94

1999 year-end chart performance for Enter the Dru
Chart (1999)	Position
US Billboard 200	41
US Top R&B/Hip-Hop Albums (Billboard)	10

== Certifications ==
Certifications for Enter the Dru
Region	Certification	Certified units/sales
Canada (Music Canada)	Gold	50,000^{^}
United Kingdom (BPI)	Gold	100,000^{*}
United States (RIAA)	2× Platinum	2,000,000^{^}
^{*} Sales figures based on certification alone.^{^} Shipments figures based on certification alone.

== Personnel ==
Information taken from Allmusic.

- A&R – Matthew Schwartz
- Arranging – Nokio the N-Tity, Guy Roche
- Assistant engineering – Tom Bender, Greg Burns, Mick Guzauski, Kevin Lively, Ted Reiger, Aaron Sprague, The Storm, Dylan Vaughn, Pascal Volberg
- Assistant mixing – E'lyk, The Storm, Pascal Volberg
- Bass – Alex Al, Ronnie Garrett, Michael Thompson
- Clothing/wardrobe – Julieanne Mijares
- Conductor(s) – Larry Gold, Sisqó
- Drum programming – Babyface, Nokio the N-Tity, Greg Phillinganes, Guy Roche, Daryl Simmons, Ralph Stacy, Damon Thomas, William "P Sound" Thomas
- Engineering – Paul Boutin, Greg Burns, Felipe Elgueta, Thom "TK" Kidd, Mario Lucy, Manny Marroquin, Jason Rome, Rafa Sardina, Jon Smeltz, Ralph Stacy, Moana Suchard, Joe Warlick
- Executive production – Dru Hill, Hiriam Hicks, Haqq Islam, Kevin Peck, Kenneth Crear
- Grooming – Heba Thorisdottir
- Guitar – James Harrah, Sonny Lallerstedt, Michael Hart Thompson
- Keyboards – Babyface, David Foster, Nokio the N-Tity, Greg Phillinganes, Guy Roche, Daryl Simmons, Ralph Stacy, Damon Thomas, Phil Weatherspoon
- Mastering – Chris Gehringer
- Mixing – Bonzai, Jon Gass, Mick Guzauski, Thom "TK" Kidd, Manny Marroquin, Thom Russo, Jon Smeltz
- Performer(s) – Chinky Brown Eyes, Method Man
- Photo assistance – Beth Coller, John Garcia
- Photography – Beth Coller, John Garcia, Tracy Lamonica
- Piano – Alex Al, Warryn Campbell, Greg Phillinganes
- Production – Baby Dave, Babyface, Warryn Campbell, Dutch, David Foster, James "Woody" Green, Nokio the N-Tity, Guy Roche, Daryl Simmons, Sisqó, Ralph Stacy, Damon Thomas
- Production coordination – Ivy Skoff
- Rapping – Method Man
- Strings – Cameron Stone
- String arranging – Larry Gold, Sisqó
- String conduction – Larry Gold
- Stylistic advisor – Laurie Chang, April Roomet
- Stylistic assistant – Laurie Chang, April Roomet
- Synclavier – Simon Franglen
- Synclavier programming – Simon Franglen
- Vocal arranging – R. Brown, Nokio the N-Tity, Guy Roche, Sisqó
- Vocal production – Nokio the N-Tity
- Vocals – Dru Hill, Nokio the N-Tity, Sisqó
- Vocals (background) – Dru Hill
