= LovHer =

Former American R&B girl group

- Origin: United States
- Genres: R&B, soul, hip-hop soul
- Years active: 1999–2007
- Labels: Def Soul
- Past members: Talia Burgess (Chinky); Marthea Jackson (Buttah); Samerrah Terrell (Serenade); Kienji Hakeem

LovHer was an American R&B girl group. The group was the first female group on the Def Soul label. The group was formed in 1999 by Sisqó, lead singer of R&B group Dru Hill, who wanted to put together a girl group that would present a raw, "street" appeal. Like Dru Hill, LovHer's members are known by hip hop nicknames:Talia "Chinky" Burgess, Marthea "Buttah" Jackson, Samerrah "Serenade" Terrell, and Kienji Hakeem. LovHer comprised the Baltimore, Maryland, native Chinky who was discovered in a talent show, Kienji from South Central Los Angeles, Serenade and Buttah from Milwaukee, Wisconsin, who were hosting a public-access television cable TV show before auditioning for the co-founder of Dru Hill.

== History ==
In 1999, LovHer made their first appearance in Sisqó's "Got to Get It" music video, and performed vocals on Sisqó's Unleash the Dragon and Return of Dragon albums. Before "Got to Get It", LovHer lead singer Chinky had appeared on Dru Hill's Enter the Dru album.

In 2002, their song "How It's Gonna Be" was released as a single from the 2001 Rush Hour 2 soundtrack, and peaked at number 60 on the Billboard Hot R&B/Hip-Hop Songs chart. The group was nominated for the Soul Train Lady of Soul award for Best R&B/Soul or Rap New Artist - Group, Band or Duo.

The group was dropped by Def Soul and recorded an album that was eventually shelved. In 2007, Kienji left the group. After a brief attempt at continuing as a trio, the remaining members of the group split up.

== Discography ==
- Advance Retail Sampler (2002)

=== Compilation appearances ===
- Rush Hour 2 soundtrack (31 July 2001) (song: "How It's Gonna Be")
