= Thong Song =

2000 single by Sisqó

Single by Sisqó

from the album Unleash the Dragon
- Released: February 15, 2000
- Recorded: 1999
- Genre: R&B; pop rap
- Length: 4:12
- Label: Def Soul
- Songwriters: Mark Andrews; Tim Kelley; Bob Robinson; Desmond Child; Draco Rosa
- Producers: Sisqó; Tim & Bob

Sisqó singles chronology
"Got to Get It" (1999)	"Thong Song" (2000)	"What These Bitches Want" (2000)

Music video
- "Thong Song" on YouTube

"Thong Song" is a song recorded by American R&B singer Sisqó. It was released on February 15, 2000, as the second single from his solo debut studio album, Unleash the Dragon (1999). "Thong Song" garnered four Grammy nominations and numerous other awards. The song peaked at number one on the Billboard Rhythmic top 40 chart and number three on the Billboard Hot 100, Sisqó's second highest-peaking hit behind "Incomplete". It was a major success worldwide as well, reaching the top ten throughout European charts and reaching number three in the United Kingdom, Netherlands, and Denmark. The song also topped the charts in New Zealand.

Female rapper Strings aka Tateeze did a response track titled "Tongue Song" which was released on DJ Clue?'s mixtape The Great Ones Pt.1 and then on her album The Black Widow.

== Production ==
The instrumental was originally produced with Michael Jackson in mind (Jackson later worked with the producers after hearing "Thong Song"). The song was written and produced by Sisqó, and Tim & Bob, the duo of Tim Kelley and Bob Robinson. Songwriters Desmond Child and Draco Rosa receive songwriting credit because of the interpolation of part of their composition, "Livin' la Vida Loca" (originally recorded by Ricky Martin), in the song's lyrics. The obbligato strings that are heard throughout the song, performed for the record by violinist Bruce Dukov, are inspired by Wes Montgomery's cover of The Beatles' "Eleanor Rigby" which Tim originally sampled in its origin.

The impetus for the song came from when the then 19-year-old singer Sisqó joked that his hair turned white the first time he saw a thong, similar to Charlton Heston in the film The Ten Commandments.

Rapper Lil' Kim was originally supposed to be included on the album version but declined. However, Kim and Sisqó collaborated on her second album, The Notorious K.I.M., a year later.

The alternate version, the official remix to the original version, "Thong Song Uncensored", features a guest rap from Foxy Brown in the spot where Sisqó whispers the main verse for the third time, and is included on the soundtrack for Nutty Professor II: The Klumps. A second, more urban-themed video was shot for the remix by Little X.

== Composition and lyrics ==
The song was composed in a key of C-sharp minor, and has a tempo of 130 beats per minute. The final chorus is set in D minor.

Sisqó has said that the lyrics of "Thong Song" were inspired by a woman he went on a date with, who stripped to reveal a thong underneath her dress. They consist of a verse, a pre-chorus, and a chorus, which are repeated with variations in style and perspective. In the first repetition, Sisqó sings the verse, which paints a picture of a sexy woman in a "scandalous" dress with a penchant for dancing. The pre-chorus hones in on her body, particularly her legs, with "dumps like a truck" and "thighs like what." The chorus is in two main parts: pulsing backing vocals which describe a love for certain beats and the dances that come with them accompany Sisqó's plea to see "That thong-th-thong-thong-thong." In the second repetition, the melody of the verse is layered in octaves, and the perspective shifts from second to third person. In the third, it is rapped rather than sung. A short, swelling instrumental section punctuated by Sisqó chanting "come on" leads into the climactic key change. Sisqó repeats the chorus once more, riffing dramatically over the backing vocals.

The song also interpolates a segment from Dru Hill's song "Real Freak" which first appeared on the band's 1998 album Enter the Dru.

== Interpolation clearance issue ==
In Vice's The Story Of documentary on Thong Song, it was revealed that producers Bob Robinson and Tim Kelly warned Sisqó of using the lyrical reference to "Livin' La Vida Loca", which was interpolated at the end of each of the three verses. Songwriter Desmond Child later received a significant writing credit, owning a majority of the publishing for "Thong Song" as a result.

== Critical reception ==
Despite commercial success, "Thong Song" was largely panned by music critics. The song placed first in a St. Paul Pioneer Press reader poll to determine the worst song in history. Other retrospective reviews have labelled the song as sexist or misogynistic.

== Music video ==
=== MTV version ===
The video was released in 2000 and directed by Joseph Kahn. Set in Miami, Sisqó is on the phone with one of his friends. His daughter and his girlfriend return from shopping, and his daughter finds and shows him the thong. Sisqó is frightened and looks at his girlfriend in a confused manner, and his girlfriend shrugs her shoulders. It then switches to Sisqó going to the beach from his home to participate in a Spring Break party with a large number of young women who are generally wearing bikinis and thongs, with the exception of one woman who wears a G-string. There are also scenes with Sisqo and his backup dancers driving a Bentley Azure down the Florida Keys, and cameos from the other three members of Sisqó's group, Dru Hill, Method Man & Redman, Ja Rule, as well as LL Cool J. Sisqó performs acrobatic feats atop the crowd that contradict the laws of physics, culminating in a stage performance lit with blacklights and with an orchestra in the background.

The video is credited for kickstarting a new wave of "booty" music videos, where women and their butts are prominently featured. It drew criticism for its sexualized nature, with accusations of the style being exploitative of and objectifying towards women. Joseph Kahn is quoted saying, "I listen to 'Thong Song', and I say, 'Well, this song is about asses.' So you can either accept it and do something like I did, or you can go and try and turn the 'Thong Song' into some kind of Chemical Brothers video and make it all pretentious; about some fucking communist upheaval or something. Let's just relax and make a booty video, and let's make a really good one, and make it fun."

Sisqó stated the video was carefully shot not to reveal too many buttocks in thong swimsuits but allowed with unorthodox camera angles.

=== Alternative version with Foxy Brown ===
In the alternative version of the video, after giving a radio interview with Nokio and Jazz of Dru Hill in his hometown of Baltimore, Sisqó escapes from a group of fans with the help of Foxy Brown to a fashion show. Here, models strut in sexy costumes, which (again) all consist of bikinis just as in the original video, this time with the exception of two women in thongs. The video also features a cameo by professional wrestler Big Show. The song was done for the soundtrack of Nutty Professor II: The Klumps. The video was directed by Little X.

=== 2017 remake ===
In 2017, Sisqó remade the song and music video with JCY, which was released on July 18, 2017. The video was released on YouTube and WorldStarHipHop with the video in its first week hitting over one million views.

== Legacy ==
Matthew Morrison performed "Thong Song" as his character Will Schuester in the episode of Glee titled "Mash-Up", aired on October 21, 2009. The song was also prominently featured in movies like Pitch Perfect 2 (2015) and Y2K (2024), and the season 5 finale of DC's Legends of Tomorrow.

== Track listing ==
CD single
No.	Title	Length
1.	"Thong Song (Radio Edit)"	3:30
2.	"Thong Song (Artful Dodger Remix)"	5:40
3.	"Thong Song (Instrumental)"	4:11
4.	"Thong Song (Video)"	4:34

12" single
No.	Title	Length
1.	"Thong Song (LP Version)"	--
2.	"Thong Song (Instrumental)"	--
3.	"Thong Song (Artful Dodger Remix)"	--

== Credits and personnel ==
Credits adapted from the liner notes of Unleash the Dragon.

Recording locations

- Larrabee West, LA
- The Tracken Place, LA, CA

Personnel

- Mixed By – Manny Marroquin
- Producer – Sisqo The Golden Child for Da Ish Entertainment, Tim Kelley and Bob Robinson
- Recorded By – Jan Fairchild
- Written By – Mark Andrews, Tim Kelley, Bob Robinson, Robi Rosa, and Desmond Child

== Charts ==
=== Weekly charts ===
Chart (2000)	Peak position
Australia (ARIA)	2
Belgium (Ultratop 50 Flanders)	15
Belgium (Ultratop 50 Wallonia)	5
Canada (Nielsen SoundScan)	11
Canada Top Singles (RPM)	2
Denmark (IFPI)	3
Europe (European Hot 100 Singles)	8
France (SNEP)	15
Germany (GfK)	15
Iceland (Íslenski Listinn Topp 40)	6
Ireland (IRMA)	7
Italy (FIMI)	20
Netherlands (Dutch Top 40)	3
Netherlands (Single Top 100)	3
New Zealand (Recorded Music NZ)	1
Norway (VG-lista)	3
Scottish Singles Sales (Official Charts)	6
Sweden (Sverigetopplistan)	8
Switzerland (Schweizer Hitparade)	8
UK Singles (Official Charts)	3
UK Dance (Official Charts)	2
UK Hip Hop/R&B (Official Charts)	1
US Billboard Hot 100	3
US Hot R&B/Hip-Hop Songs (Billboard)	2
US Latin Pop Airplay (Billboard)	25
US Pop Airplay (Billboard)	4
US Rhythmic Airplay (Billboard)	1
US Tropical Airplay (Billboard)	19

=== Year-end charts ===
Chart (2000)	Position
Australia (ARIA)	23
Belgium (Ultratop Flanders)	68
Belgium (Ultratop Wallonia)	15
Denmark (IFPI)	20
Europe (Eurochart Hot 100)	30
France (SNEP)	55
Germany (Official German Charts)	92
Iceland (Íslenski Listinn Topp 40)	82
Ireland (IRMA)	55
Netherlands (Dutch Top 40)	27
Netherlands (Single Top 100)	26
Sweden (Sverigetopplistan)	50
Switzerland (Schweizer Hitparade)	49
UK Singles (OCC)	29
UK Urban (Music Week)	4
US Billboard Hot 100	14
US Hot R&B/Hip-Hop Songs (Billboard)	13
US Mainstream Top 40 (Billboard)	35
US Rhythmic (Billboard)	2

== Certifications ==
Region	Certification	Certified units/sales
Australia (ARIA)	Platinum	70,000^{^}
Belgium (BRMA)	Gold	25,000^{*}
Denmark	—	6,868
France (SNEP)	Gold	250,000^{*}
New Zealand (RMNZ)	Gold	5,000^{*}
Sweden (GLF)	Gold	15,000^{^}
United Kingdom (BPI)	2× Platinum	1,200,000^{‡}
^{*} Sales figures based on certification alone.^{^} Shipments figures based on certification alone.^{‡} Sales+streaming figures based on certification alone.

== Other versions and sampling ==
In 2000, Chicago female rapper Strings released a single entitled "Tongue Song", which was a female response to "Thong Song". It peaked at number 24 on the Billboard Bubbling Under R&B/Hip-Hop Singles chart and number 13 on Billboard Hot Rap Singles chart.

In 2015, WTMD commissioned reinterpretations by seven artists in Sisqó's native Baltimore, including Horse Lords and TT the Artist.

In 2016, Australian pop singer and songwriter Sia released This Is Acting, featuring the track "Sweet Design", which samples and references the "Thong Song".

For Jimmy Kimmel Live's Mash-Up Monday segment, Sisqó teamed up with Panic! at the Disco in a joint performance of "Thong Song". The combined act was aptly named "Panic! at the Sisqó".

On the February 11, 2020 episode of The Tonight Show Starring Jimmy Fallon, Jimmy Fallon along with the Backstreet Boys as the "Ragtime Gals" sang the song in the style of a barbershop quartet.

Sisqó appeared as himself in the fifth-season finale of Legends of Tomorrow, titled "Swan Thong", where the song played in the background as the Legends fight various villains of history when a button was pressed on the Sisqó display. In addition to performing, the singer dyed his hair platinum and paid tribute to the video by wearing the same outfit.
