= Incomplete (Sisqó song) =

2000 single by Sisqó

Single by Sisqó

from the album Unleash the Dragon
- B-side: "Thong Song"
- Released: June 13, 2000
- Recorded: 1999
- Length: 4:35
- Label: Def Soul
- Songwriters: Montell Jordan; Anthony "Shep" Crawford
- Producer: Anthony "Shep" Crawford

Sisqó singles chronology
"Thong Song" (2000)	"Incomplete" (2000)	"How Many Licks?" (2000)

"Incomplete" is a song by American R&B singer Sisqó. It was released on June 13, 2000, as the third and final single from his first solo album, Unleash the Dragon (1999). Written by Montell Jordan and Anthony "Shep" Crawford and produced by Crawford, the song was Sisqó's biggest solo single and his only number-one hit in the United States, topping both the Billboard Hot 100 chart and the Billboard Hot R&B/Hip-Hop Singles & Tracks chart. "Incomplete" is also Sisqó's third and most recent Hot 100 top-40 hit; within two years of its release, Sisqó would return to his role as Dru Hill's lead singer.

== Background ==
Montell Jordan says the song "Incomplete" is "about a guy who literally had everything but without the girl his life would be incomplete". It was originally recorded by LaFace Records artist Sam Salter. Jordan and Shep Crawford offered "Incomplete" to Sisqó in 1999, as he was recording his debut solo album Unleash the Dragon. Sisqó wasn't particularly fond of the song, a slow ballad close in style to those he recorded as lead singer of Dru Hill, and had to be coerced into recording the composition.

== Music video ==
"Incomplete" features Sisqó in the role of a rich and famous man who appears to have everything he wants in life, except for the love of the woman (played by LisaRaye McCoy) who left him some time ago. The song's music video, directed by Chris Robinson, depicts Sisqó as living a solitary life in a large mansion, and spending his free time remembering his happier times.

== Personnel ==
- Lead vocals performed, produced, and arranged by Sisqó
- Background vocals performed by Shae Jones
- Written by Montell Jordan and Anthony "Shep" Crawford
- Produced by Anthony "Shep" Crawford

== Charts ==
=== Weekly charts ===
Chart (2000–2001)	Peak position
Australia (ARIA) with "Got to Get It"	28
Europe (Eurochart Hot 100)	42
Germany (GfK)	51
Netherlands (Dutch Top 40 Tipparade)	2
Netherlands (Single Top 100)	51
Scottish Singles Sales (Official Charts)	32
Switzerland (Schweizer Hitparade)	31
UK Singles (Official Charts)	13
UK Dance (Official Charts)	25
UK Hip Hop/R&B (Official Charts)	5
US Billboard Hot 100	1
US Hot R&B/Hip-Hop Songs (Billboard)	1
US Pop Airplay (Billboard)	34
US Rhythmic Airplay (Billboard)	12

=== Year-end charts ===
Chart (2000)	Position
US Billboard Hot 100	25
US Hot R&B/Hip-Hop Singles & Tracks (Billboard)	3
US Rhythmic Top 40 (Billboard)	41

== Certifications ==
Region	Certification	Certified units/sales
United States (RIAA)	Platinum	1,000,000

== Release history ==
Region	Date	Format(s)	Label(s)	Ref(s).
United States	June 13, 2000	Rhythmic contemporary radio	Def Soul	
United States	July 25, 2000	Contemporary hit radio	Def Soul	
United Kingdom	December 4, 2000	12-inch vinyl; CD; cassette	Def Soul	
Australia	January 8, 2001	CD	Def Soul	

== See also ==
- List of Billboard Hot 100 number-one singles of 2000
