= InDRUpendence Day =

Studio album by Dru Hill
- Released: July 27, 2010 (Release history)
- Recorded: June 2008–March 2010
- Genre: R&B, soul
- Length: 56:43
- Label: Kedar Entertainment Group
- Producer: Kedar Massenburg, Dru Hill and Kevin Peck (executive); Wirlie Morris, Nathan Mooring, Jason "J-Hott" Scott

Dru Hill chronology
| Dru World Order (2002) | InDRUpendence Day (2010) |

Singles from InDRUpendence Day
- 1. "Love MD" Released: January 26, 2010; 2. "Remain Silent" Released: July 13, 2010; 3. "Back to the Future" Released: July 27, 2010

Professional ratings
Review scores
| Source | Rating |
|---|---|
| Allmusic | 3/5 stars |
| Slant Magazine | 2.5/5 stars |
| USA Today | 2.5/4 stars |

InDRUpendence Day is the fourth studio album by American R&B group Dru Hill, released on July 27, 2010 under Kedar Entertainment Group. The album was supposed to be released on June 8, 2010, but it was pushed back. The album is the group's first release with new member, Tao, and is also their first album in eight years since their previous album, Dru World Order. The album released three singles: "Love MD", "Remain Silent" and "Back to the Future". "Love MD" is the only single that had a music video released. Despite the lack of charting singles and the fact that it was their first album in 8 years, the album was still moderately successful, reaching #30 on the Billboard 200.

== Background ==
The album was confirmed in 2009 following the addition of new member Antwuan "Tao" Simpson in 2008 - after winning a talent contest called "Dru Idol" to become the group's fourth member. The group toured as a trio prior to the addition of Tao. "Our harmony is so intricate that in order to keep the integrity of what's going on the record and still perform for the fans, it's almost impossible to do with just three people," Sisqo explained in an interview with MTV. "Most of the time you have to have that three-part harmony structure while the other person is singing lead. Sometimes our harmony is so intricate, we might have to stop singing lead to make sure the integrity of the harmony is there... We didn't feel it was right to cheat the people out of that." "It's a great addition Tao brings to the group," Jazz offered. "His register is a little higher than normally what's been presented in the Dru Hill sound. It's just hot, man. This record is crazy." "People have been accepting me in the group. You get your haters here and there, but for the most part, it's a dream," Tao said.

=== Sound ===
The sound for InDRUpendence Day is "what you're used to hear from us. It's the harmonies, the melodies. We're singing about relationships," Nokio said. "As businessmen and writers and producers, we made sure we tried to incorporate what's going on now without becoming what's going on right now."

== Release and promotion ==
InDRUpendence Day was released on July 27, 2010, preceded by the single "Love MD".

=== Listening party ===
The "InDRUpendence Day" album listening party was held on March 30, 2010 at Le Lupanar in New York City.

=== Reality show ===
The group's reality show "Platinum House" premiered on June 28, 2010 on Centric. It's about the group starting over and coming back together recording and writing music. The show focuses on their daily lives and this album.

== Track listing ==
| No. | Title | Producer(s) | Length |
|---|---|---|---|
| 1. | "Shut It Down" | Nathan Mooring | 3:51 |
| 2. | "Do It Again" | Nathan Mooring | 3:40 |
| 3. | "She Wants Me" | Wirlie Morris | 4:04 |
| 4. | "Whatcha Do" | Wirlie Morris | 3:47 |
| 5. | "Below Zero" | Wirlie Morris | 4:09 |
| 6. | "Can't Stop" | Jason "J-Hott" Scott | 3:39 |
| 7. | "Remain Silent" | Wirlie Morris, Keith Sweat | 3:48 |
| 8. | "Makin Luv" | Jason "J-Hott" Scott | 4:27 |
| 9. | "State of Emergency" | Wirlie Morris | 3:43 |
| 10. | "Back to the Future" | Wirlie Morris | 3:50 |
| 11. | "Love MD" | Wirlie Morris | 4:06 |
| 12. | "Away" | Wirlie Morris | 4:45 |
| 13. | "Rule the World" | Starr Strukk | 4:05 |
| 14. | "If You Fall" (iTunes bonus track) | Jason "J-Hott" Scott | 4:09 |
| 15. | "Guitar" (iTunes bonus track) | | 4:14 |
| 16. | "Wind" (Black Angel Down snippet) | | 1:32 |
| 17. | "How Deep Is Your Love" (Black Angel Down snippet) | | 1:37 |
| 18. | "The End" (Black Angel Down snippet) | | 1:34 |

== Charts ==
Chart performance for InDRUpendence Day
| Chart (2010) | Peak position |
|---|---|
| US Billboard 200 | 30 |
| US Top R&B/Hip-Hop Albums (Billboard) | 10 |

== Release history ==
InDRUpendence Day release history
| Region | Date | Label(s) | Format(s) |
|---|---|---|---|
| United States | July 27, 2010 | Kedar Entertainment | CD, download |
| Canada | July 30, 2010 | Kedar Entertainment | CD, download |
