= Sisqó =

American R&B singer (born 1978)

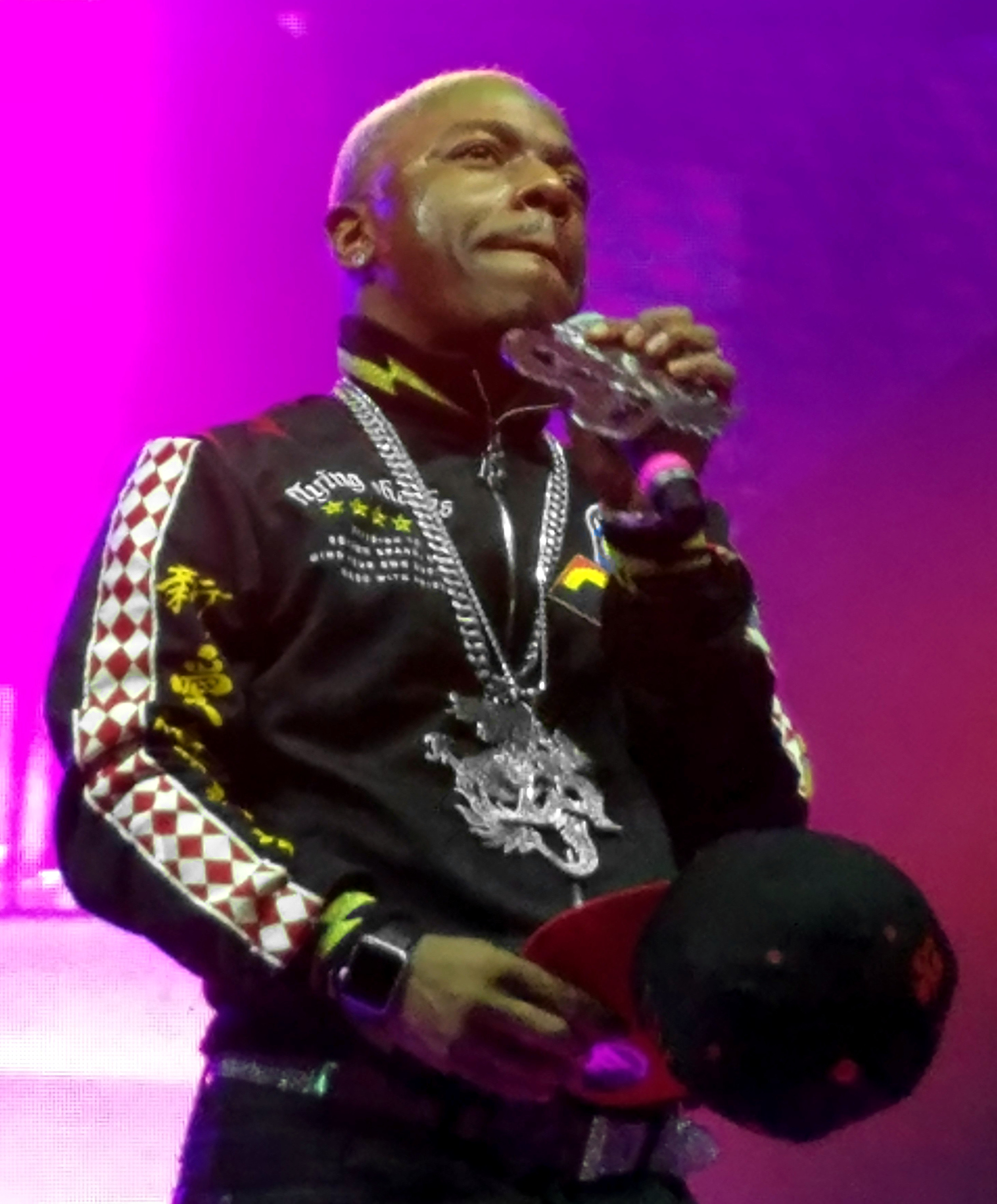
- Sisqó performing in 2018

Background information
- Born: Mark Althavan Andrews; November 9, 1978 (age 48); Baltimore, Maryland, U.S.
- Genres: R&B; pop
- Occupations: Singer; songwriter; record producer; dancer; actor
- Years active: 1992–present
- Labels: Dragon; EMPIRE; Kedar; Def Jam; Island; Island Def Jam
- Member of: Dru Hill
- Website: sisqo.com

Mark Althavan Andrews (born November 9, 1978), known professionally as Sisqó (stylized as SisQó), is an American R&B singer. Following his tenure as lead performer of the R&B group Dru Hill, he quickly reached success as a solo act with the release of his debut studio album Unleash the Dragon (1999), which peaked at number two on the Billboard 200. It spawned the singles "Incomplete" and "Thong Song", which peaked at numbers one and three on the Billboard Hot 100, respectively.

== Early life ==
As a teen, Andrews worked at The Fudgery in Harborplace at Baltimore's Inner Harbor with Larry "Jazz" Anthony, James "Woody" Green, and Tamir "Nokio" Ruffin. The quartet would be signed as the group Dru Hill to Island Records in 1996. He lived in the Reservoir Hill neighborhood at 908 Newington Avenue near Druid Hill Park, which is where the group got their name.

== Career ==
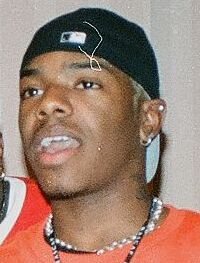
Sisqó in 1996

After Woody departed Dru Hill in 1999 to pursue a solo career, it was decided that the other members would follow suit and issue their own solo albums. Sisqó's solo debut, Unleash the Dragon, was released on Def Soul Records in November 1999. Unleash the Dragon sold moderately at first, until the February 2000 release of its second single, the novelty "Thong Song". A runaway hit, "Thong Song" and its follow-up, "Incomplete", were major hits on the Billboard Hot 100 chart, with "Thong Song" making it to number three, and "Incomplete" going to number one. This success resulted in Play Along Toys manufacturing a Sisqó doll in 2001.

Formed by Sisqó in 1999, LovHer was the first female quartet on the Def Soul label. Their single "How It's Gonna Be" was featured on the Rush Hour 2 soundtrack in 2001.

Conflicts within Dru Hill prevented the group from reuniting as planned in 2000. This is usually attributed to time conflicts during the recording of Sisqó's second solo LP. During this period, Sisqó branched out into hosting the dance competition program Sisqós Shakedown on MTV, and into film, taking on supporting roles in the films Get Over It (2001) with Kirsten Dunst and Snow Dogs (2002) with Cuba Gooding, Jr. He also starred as a vampire in Sabrina the Teenage Witch (Season 6 Episode 1). Although his second LP, Return of Dragon, released in June 2001, eventually went platinum, its singles "Can I Live" and "Dance for Me" performed far below expectations (apart from in the United Kingdom, where "Dance for Me" became his third top ten hit). By 2002, Sisqó reunited with Dru Hill, which released its third LP in late 2002. The LP underperformed, and the group was subsequently released from their recording contract.

In January 2008, Sisqó was a contestant on a reality show called "Gone Country."

In 2010, Sisqó was a contestant on the British reality television show Celebrity Big Brother 7, which he placed 8th. He was the fifth contestant to be evicted, lasting 20 days.

Dru Hill released its third album, InDRUpendence Day, in 2010 as an independent release through Kedar Entertainment. The group also appeared at this time in the reality show Keith Sweat's Platinum House on BET's sister station Centric.

Sisqó continued to tour through the 2010s, both as a member of Dru Hill, and as a solo act. His third solo album, Last Dragon, was released on February 10, 2015. The singles, "A-List" and "L.I.P.s" were released ahead of the album, with the latter reaching number 23 on the US Adult R&B charts, becoming Sisqó's first charting US single since 2001's "Can I Live".

As of 2015, Sisqó, along with the other members of Dru Hill, claimed that their record label botched a record deal, costing them millions in the process.

In 2016, Sisqó provided a rap counterpoint in a duet with country music singer Marie Osmond, in her song "Give me a Good Song", which was featured on Music Is Medicine, released on April 15, 2016.

In 2017, Sisqó, sang on a remake of his "Thong Song" produced by JCY.

In 2018, Sisqo released a holiday book for children, titled "Sisqo's Perfect Christmas", with creative partner, Tilesha Brown.

He represented Maryland in the American Song Contest, which began on March 21, 2022, on NBC.

In 2024, Sisqó competed on season eleven of The Masked Singer as "Lizard". He was eliminated on "Shower Anthems Night" and did an encore performance of "Thong Song".

== Personal life ==
Sisqó has a daughter, Shaione Andrews, born in 1995. He resides in Maple Grove, Minnesota, with his wife Elizabeth Pham, with whom he has been romantically involved since 2003. They have two children: a son named Ryu Andrews born in June 2012, and a daughter named Kimiqo Star, aka QoQo born in September 2014.

In July 2013, Sisqó appeared on the reality show Celebrity Wife Swap, where Elizabeth was "swapped" with the wife of 1990s pop singer Gerardo Mejía.

He previously dated R&B singer Samantha Mumba from 2004 to 2005.

== Discography ==
with Dru Hill

- Dru Hill (1996)
- Enter the Dru (1998)
- Dru World Order (2002)
- InDRUpendence Day (2010)
- Christmas in Baltimore (2017)

Solo albums

- Unleash the Dragon (1999)
- Return of Dragon (2001)
- Last Dragon (2015)

== Filmography ==
=== Film ===
Year	Title	Role	Notes
2001	Get Over It!	Dennis Wallace	
2002	Snow Dogs	Dr. Rupert Brooks	
2003	Pieces of April	Latrell	
2006	Surf School	Mo	

=== Television ===
Year	Title	Role	Notes
1996–2003	Soul Train	Himself	Recurring Guest
1998–2003	Top of the Pops	Himself	Recurring Guest
2000	Showtime at the Apollo	Himself	Episode: "Sisqo/Rudy Rush"
2000	Making the Video	Himself	Episode: "Sisqó: The Thong Song"
2000	Saturday Night Live	Himself	Episode: "Tobey Maguire/Sisqo"
2000	Sisqó's Shakedown	Himself	Main Host
2000	MTV Cribs	Himself	Episode: "Episode 1.2"
2000	Soul Train Lady of Soul Awards	Himself	Main Co-Host
2000	Linc's	Silky-Silk	Episode: "East Meets West"
2001	Sabrina the Teenage Witch	Vladimir Kortensky	Episode: "Really Big Season Opener"
2003	America's Most Talented Kid	Himself	Episode: "March 22, 2003" (judge)
2007	The Most Annoying Pop Songs.... We Hate to Love	Himself	Episode: "Episode 1.4"
2008	Gone Country	Himself	Main Cast: Season 1
2008	I Love the New Millennium	Himself	Recurring Guest
2010	Celebrity Big Brother UK	Himself	Housemate: Season 7
2013	Celebrity Wife Swap	Himself	Episode: "Gerardo/Sisqó"
2017	Kinda Funny: The Animated Series	Himself	Episode: "Die Hard" (voice)
2018	Vixen	Himself	Episode: "Hip Hop's New Star Was Born"
2019	Traveling the Stars	Himself	Episode: "The Replicants"
2020	Unsung	Himself	Episode: "Dru Hill"
2020	Legends of Tomorrow	Himself	Episode: "Swan Thong"
2022	American Song Contest	Himself	Episode: "The Live Qualifiers Part 5" (contestant)
2024	The Masked Singer	"Lizard"	Eliminated in episode 5 (contestant)

=== Commercials ===
Product/Brand	Year	Director	Ref
Pepsi	2000	Unknown	

== Tours ==
As supporting act

- No Strings Attached Tour (supporting NSYNC) (2000)
- Black & Blue World Tour (supporting Backstreet Boys) (2001)

Featured act

- Roc Tha Block (2007)
- Hammer's House Party Tour (2019)
- RNB Fridays Live (2019)

== Awards and nominations ==
- American Music Awards

Year	Nominee / work	Award	Result
2001	Sisqó	Favorite Male R&B/Soul Artist	Nominated
2001	Unleash the Dragon	Favorite R&B/Soul Album	Nominated

- Billboard Music Awards

Year	Nominee / work	Award	Result
2000	Sisqó	Male Artist of the Year	Won
2000	Sisqó	Male Hot 100 Singles Artist of the Year	Won
2000	Sisqó	R&B/Hip-Hop Artist of the Year	Won
2000	Sisqó	New R&B/Hip-Hop Artist of the Year	Won
2000	Sisqó	R&B/Hip-Hop Male Artist of the Year	Won
2000	Sisqó	R&B/Hip-Hop Singles Artist of the Year	Won

- Grammy Awards

Year	Nominee / work	Award	Result
2001	Sisqó	Best New Artist	Nominated
2001	Thong Song	Best R&B Male Vocal Performance	Nominated
2001	Thong Song	Best R&B Song	Nominated
2001	Unleash the Dragon	Best R&B Album	Nominated

- MOBO Awards

Year	Nominee / work	Award	Result
2001	Sisqó	Best R&B Act	Nominated
2000	Thong Song	Best Video	Nominated
2000	Sisqó	Best R&B Act	Nominated

- MTV Europe Music Awards

Year	Nominee / work	Award	Result
2000	Sisqó	Best Male	Nominated
2000	Sisqó	Best R&B	Nominated

- MTV Video Music Awards

Year	Nominee / work	Award	Result
2000	Thong Song	Best Hip-Hop Video	Won
2000	Thong Song	Best New Artist	Nominated
2000	Thong Song	Best Dance Video	Nominated
2000	Thong Song (Remix) w/ Foxy Brown	Best Video from a Film	Nominated
2000	Thong Song	Viewer's Choice	Nominated

- Soul Train Music Awards

Year	Nominee / work	Award	Result
2001	Unleash the Dragon	Favorite Male R&B/Soul Album	Nominated

- Teen Choice Awards

Year	Nominee / work	Award	Result
2000	Sisqó	Choice Male Artist	Won
2000	Thong Song	Choice R&B/Hip-Hop Track	Won
2000	Sisqó	Choice Breakout Artist	Nominated
2000	Incomplete	Choice Song of the Summer	Nominated

== Books ==
Title	Author	Year	Pages	Note(s)
SisQó: The Man Behind the Thong	Leah Furman	2001	201	Biography
SisQó's Perfect Christmas	Tilesha Brown	2018	150	Co-written with Sisqó
