= Dru Hill =

American contemporary R&B group

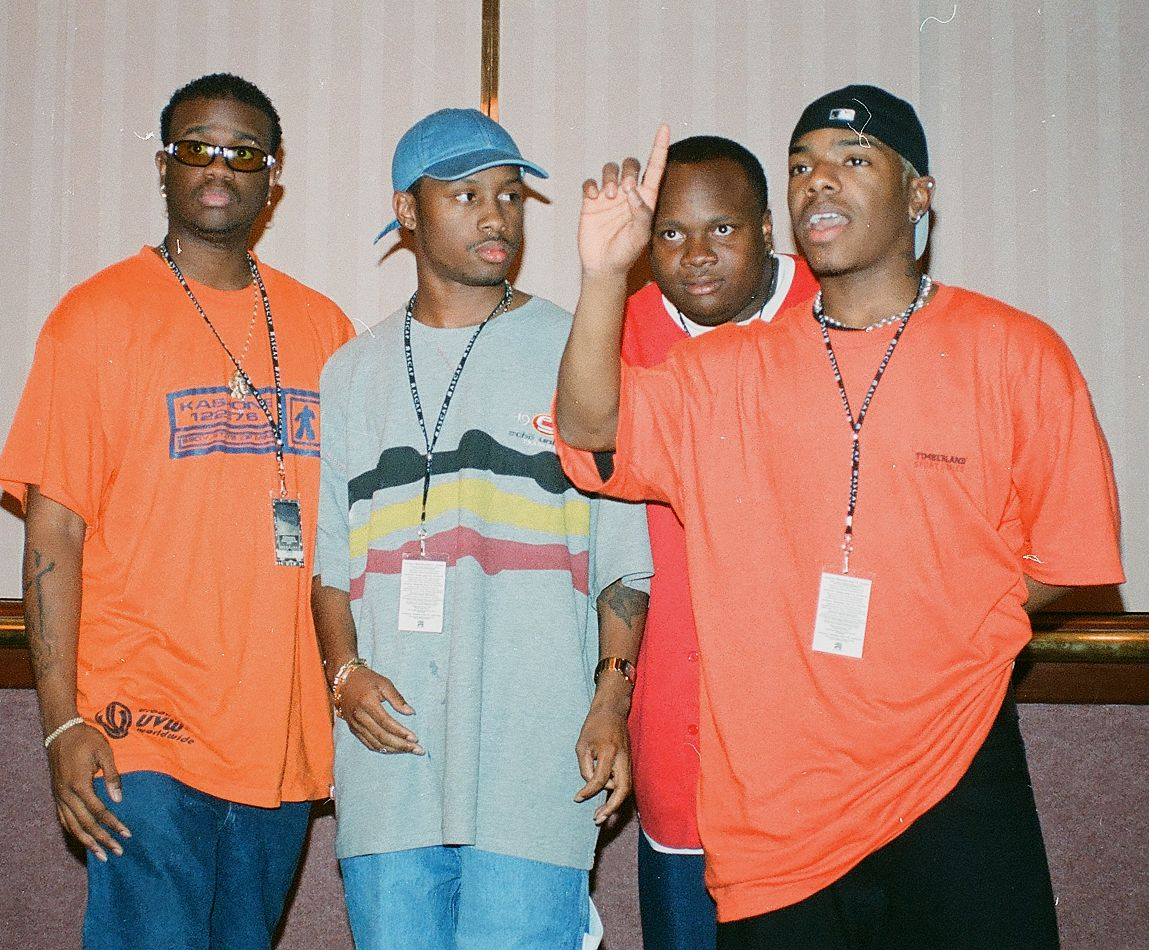
- Dru Hill in 1996 (L–R): Woody, Nokio, Jazz and Sisqó

Background information
- Origin: Baltimore, Maryland, U.S.
- Genres: R&B
- Works: Dru Hill discography
- Years active: 1992–1999, 2002–present
- Labels: Island; Def Soul; Def Jam; Kedar; Empire
- Members: Sisqó; Nokio; Jazz; Scola; Smoke; Black
- Past members: Woody; Tao
- Website: www.yearofthedru.com

Logo
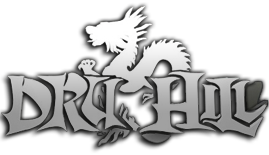

Dru Hill is an American R&B boy band that achieved popularity in the late 1990s. Encompassing soul, hip hop soul and gospel music, the group was founded in Baltimore in 1992 by Tamir "Nokio the N-Tity" Ruffin, who served as a member alongside lead singer Mark "Sisqó" Andrews, Larry "Jazz" Anthony and James "Woody" Green. Dru Hill has released seven Billboard Hot 100 top 40 hits, and are best known for their singles "In My Bed", "Never Make a Promise" and "How Deep Is Your Love".

The group signed with A. Haqq Islam's University Records, an imprint of Island Records' then-newfound urban division in 1994. The label released their first two albums—Dru Hill (1996) and Enter the Dru (1998)—to moderate success before separating for a period from late 1999 to 2002, during which time Sisqó and Woody released solo albums. While Woody's album, Soul Music, was a moderate success in the gospel music industry, Sisqó's debut album, Unleash the Dragon (1999), and its hit singles, "Thong Song" and "Incomplete", were major pop successes, and established Sisqó as a prominent solo act in outside of Dru Hill. His second solo album, Return of Dragon (2000), did not perform as well.

In 2002, by then part of the Def Soul record label, following a merger between Island, sister label Def Jam Recordings and Universal Music Group, the group reunited and added fifth member Scola to the lineup for their third album, Dru World Order (2002); after its commercial underperformance, the group met with Island Def Jam president L.A. Reid about a follow-up. When the group failed to develop their fourth album, Def Jam cited the group as non-productive and destructive, having dropped the group from Def Soul in 2004. In 2009, the group signed to Kedar Entertainment Group and released their fourth album, InDRUpendence Day, the following year, with new member Tao taking the place of the again departed Woody.

Dru Hill was influenced by the Dragon and Asian culture, as displayed in their wardrobe and logo.

== History ==
=== Early career ===
The members of Dru Hill are natives of Baltimore. The group became known getting jobs at The Fudgery, a local fudge factory at Harborplace at Baltimore's Inner Harbor, beginning a store tradition of singing and performing to entertain guests while making fudge. The group's name comes from Baltimore's Druid Hill Park, which is commonly shortened in the local vernacular to "Dru Hill".

=== Self-titled debut album (1996) ===
After scoring a deal with Island Black Music, an urban, "Black market-targeted" division of Island Records in 1994, two years later, on November 19, 1996, the group released their eponymous debut album. It peaked at number twenty-three on the Billboard 200 and went on to sell over one million copies by the summer of 1997. It scored major hits like "In My Bed", "Tell Me" and "Never Make a Promise".

=== Success, guest appearances and Island Records dispute ===
Between their first and second albums, Dru Hill contributed "We're Not Making Love No More", a number 2 R&B and number 13 pop hit, to the Soul Food soundtrack. "We're Not Making Love No More" was written and produced by producer Babyface. Dru Hill and rapper Foxy Brown recorded "Big Bad Mama", a remake of Carl Carlton's 1981 hit "She's a Bad Mama Jama (She's Built, She's Stacked)", which was the main single for the soundtrack to the 1997 Bill Bellamy film Def Jam's How to Be a Player. The group was also instrumental in writing and producing for new University artist Mýa, whose first two singles "It's All About Me" and "Movin' On", were co-written by Sisqó, who also performs guest vocals on "It's All About Me".

In 1997, Dru Hill filed a lawsuit against Island Records, seeking a release from its contract, after an Island employee hit one of the group's managers, Keith Ingram, over the head with a pool cue. It was discovered that the employee in question had a criminal record. At an October 1997 deposition hearing, Eric Kronfeld, president and chief operating officer of Island's parent company PolyGram, was asked why he had hired such an individual. His response was that if he were not to hire African-Americans with criminal records, then "there would be virtually no African-Americans employees in our society or in our industry."

Kronfield's remarks set off a wave of controversy when word of them reached the media in November. The Reverend Jesse Jackson became personally involved, publicly stating that the Dutch-based PolyGram had "a pattern of race and sex exclusion." Jackson met with PolyGram chairman Alain Levy and several other executives, who issued a public apology for Kronfield's statement, and replaced Kronfield as president with Motown Records' chairman Clarence Avant. By the end of the month, Dru Hill had settled with Island Records, and issued a joint statement with the label, stating in the agreement that they would remain on the label.

=== Enter the Dru (1998), Island Def Jam merger, Woody's departure and Sisqó's solo success ===
Dru Hill's third top 20 pop hit came in the form of 1998's "How Deep Is Your Love" (Pop No. 3), which was included on the soundtrack to the Jackie Chan and Chris Tucker film Rush Hour. The single "This Is What We Do", featuring a guest rap from Method Man, set the tone for the group's second album, Enter the Dru. The album featured several other mid-tempo tracks in the vein of "How Deep Is Your Love", as well as the R&B top 5 single "These are the Times" (Pop No. 21), co-written and co-produced by Babyface, and featuring guitar work from Atlanta-based session guitarist and former Earth Wind & Fire member Dick Smith. The album was released on October 27, 1998. It peaked at number two on the Billboard 200 and eventually sold two million copies by May 1999.

After PolyGram (parent company of Island) was acquired by Seagram on December 10, 1998, thus PolyGram's music division was later merged with Universal Music Group in 1999. Then, on New Year's Eve, Island Records' operations as a label was combined with sister labels Mercury Records and Def Jam Recordings to become The Island Def Jam Music Group. As a result, Island Black Music was folded, soon after Island and Mercury's R&B and hip hop rosters were transferred to Def Jam and thus, Dru Hill was moved to its R&B division of Def Soul, having found a new label home. However, after a shooting incident at a concert in Paris that almost costed two lives of its entourage, member Woody Rock decided to part ways with the group. Later that year, Dru Hill released a remix of "You Are Everything", featuring rapper Ja Rule, and recorded a version of "Enchantment Passing Through" for the soundtrack to the Broadway musical Aida, which was also featured on Sisqó's solo debut album Unleash the Dragon, which was later released in November 1999. The album had a minor hit with his first single, "Got to Get It" featuring Make It Hot. His second single, "Thong Song", became a major hit during the spring of 2000, and his third, "Incomplete", became a number-one hit during the summer.

The group made the final appearance of that year on the title track to the western comedy film Wild Wild West, starring the track's leading performer, Will Smith.

=== Dru World Order (2002) and Def Soul issues ===
Before the group's third album came into fruition, Dru Hill began having problems internally. Sisqó's success as a solo artist had hampered the group. Def Jam president Kevin Liles, a fellow Baltimore native, pressured the group for a comeback album and a few solo follow-ups, but it never fully materialized. Jazz was supposed to release a solo debut album in 2001 after having recorded it between 1999 and 2000, but due to issues with Lyor Cohen, another top Def Jam executive, the album was shelved and Jazz was dropped from the Def Soul division as a solo artist. Nokio focused on his work as a producer, having produced for DMX ("What These Bitches Want"), Foxy Brown ("Na Na Be Like") and others. In 2000, Sisqó and Nokio formed the label, Dragon Records, and signed a girl group named LovHer. Then, on June 19, 2001, Sisqó released his sophomore solo album, Return of Dragon, but it performed poorly, causing Dru Hill's comeback for the year to be postponed. After releasing his solo gospel album, Soul Music, in May, and with a new agreement with Def Jam, Dru Hill decided to invite Woody back into the fold while adding a new member, Rufus "Scola" Waller" to the group as its fifth inductee. Dru World Order was finished by July and finally released on November 26, 2002, two years after its planned release. Nearly all of the album's tracks were produced by Nokio, who sung lead on the tracks "She Said" and "Men Always Regret". Producers such as Bryan Michael Cox and Kwamé also made contributions. Most of the album's tracks featured Sisqó, Jazz, Woody, and Scola sharing the leads, including the lead single "I Should Be...". "I Should Be..." was a top thirty pop hit and a top ten R&B hit, respectively.

By August 2003, promotion and marketing for the album died down as Def Jam signed another boy band to its Def Soul imprint, 112, helping to support their upcoming fourth album at the time, Hot & Wet. Because of this, Dru Hill felt frustrated and decided to take another hiatus until issues would have been resolved. Throughout 2004, their label situation worsened when Liles and Cohen left Def Jam and were replaced by L.A. Reid. He started pushing the group to record a fourth studio album for the label only to postpone the project to focus on artists of his certainty. Due to the group's failure to produce any new music featuring Sisqó, who chose not to lend his vocals to new recordings as ordered by Reid, he reviewed Dru Hill as a destructive and a self-imploding group that was not fully productive. As a result, the buzz around the album never became a reality and on July 17, 2004, the group was confirmed to have been dropped from Def Soul, ending their five-year relationship with Def Jam.

On October 11, 2005, Def Soul released a greatest hits compilation, Dru Hill: Hits, along with a corresponding DVD collection of the group's music videos. Both collections included Sisqó's biggest solo hits, "Thong Song" and "Incomplete", alongside the Dru Hill songs.

=== Family affairs ===
In the midst of Dru Hill's label issues, in 2003, Sisqó became involved in a relationship with his stylist Elizabeth Pham, whom he later married on August 17, 2018. That same year, on June 12, group founder Nokio fathered a son named Niko, whose mother is radio personality Angie Martinez.

=== Woody and Scola's departure ===
In early 2008, the original quartet version of Dru Hill began touring alongside fellow 1990s acts Tony! Toni! Toné!, Bell Biv Devoe, and Keith Sweat. The group held a contest in their native Baltimore for a replacement for Woody, who left the group again earlier in January, settling upon a new singer, Antwuan "Tao" Simpson. The group never said why they did not keep Scola in the group, although it was later stated by Nokio that "five people [mess] up the money".

=== InDRUpendence Day (2010) ===
InDRUpendence Day is Dru Hill's fourth album, released on July 27, 2010. It features the group's new member, Tao. The album has released three singles: "Love MD", "Remain Silent" and "Back to the Future". It was released under the label, Kedar Entertainment, which was founded by the album's executive producer, Kedar Massenburg.

=== New lineup and The Second Coming ===
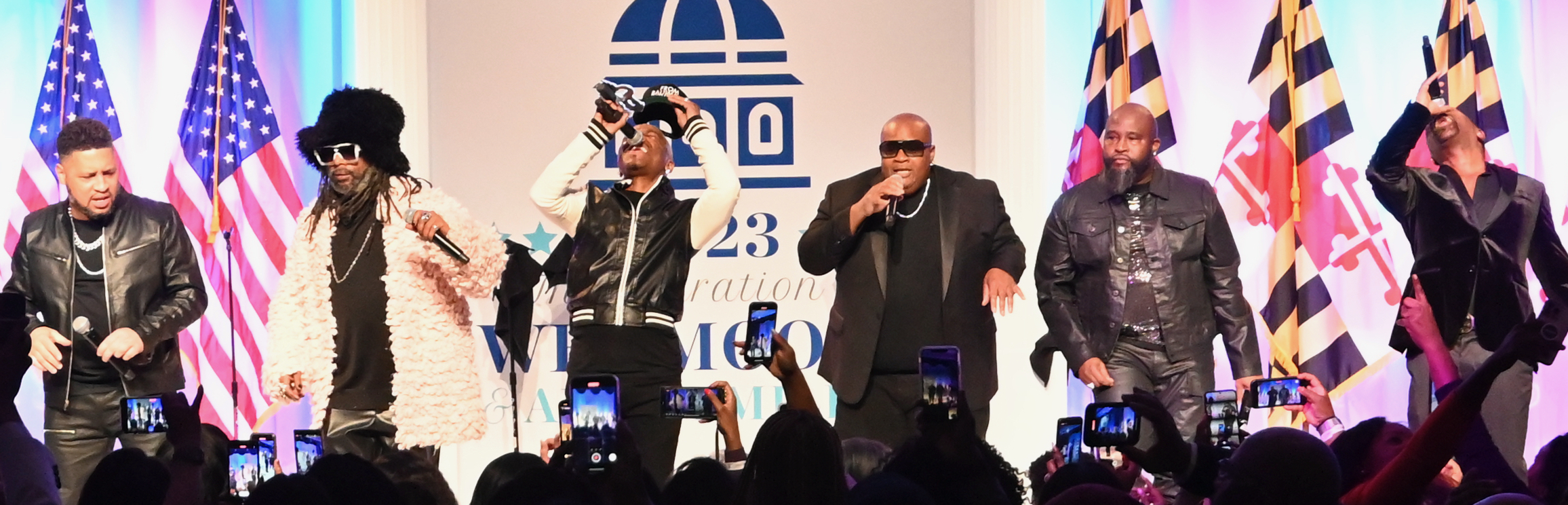
Dru Hill performing in 2023

Jazz left the group in early 2018 to work on his solo album and Tao left in early 2019 to work on a solo project because he did not like the direction Dru Hill was going. He is currently the new lead vocalist for Intro.

In August 2018, a new album, The Second Coming, was announced. It was to feature two new members from the group Playa, Smoke E. Digglera and Digital Black, who started performing with them after Jazz left the group. The first single from the album, "What You Need", was released in February 2020. Later that month, Nokio confirmed on Magic 95.9 that he has left Dru Hill to spend time with his family. A comeback of the band with the new lineup, Sisqo, Smoke, and Black, was hinted in March 2020.

As of 2025, the band is touring extensively with the lineup of SisQo, Nokio, Jazz, Scola, Black and Smoke.

== Television appearances ==
Dru Hill had their own television show titled Keith Sweat's Platinum House. It debuted June 28, 2010, on Centric. It focused on their fourth album, InDRUpendence Day, and depicted the progress of returning as a full group, and their work to create new music.

The original premiere on July 14, 2009, on the main BET Network was postponed, but aired later on Centric.

== Members ==
=== Current members ===
- Sisqó – (1992–present)
- Nokio – (1992–2020; 2021–present)
- Jazz – (1993–2018; 2021–present)
- Scola – (2001–2008; 2021–present)
- Smoke – (2018–present)
- Black – (2018–present)

=== Former members ===
- Woody – (1992; 1994–1999, 2002–2008)
- Tao – (2008–2019; 2021–2024)

== Discography ==
Studio albums

- Dru Hill (1996)
- Enter the Dru (1998)
- Dru World Order (2002)
- InDRUpendence Day (2010)

== Filmography ==
=== Television ===
- All That (1996–1997)
- Moesha (1997)
- The Parent 'Hood (1997)

=== TV specials ===
- Breaking Out: The Alcatraz Concert (1998)
- 24 hours with Dru Hill (1999)
- Keith Sweat's Platinum House (2009)
- Unsung (2020)

== Tours ==
Headlining

- Enter the Dru Tour (1999)

Featured act

- R&B Lovers Tour (2026)
- Budweiser Superfest 97 (1997)
- No Way Out Tour (1998)
- Budweiser Superfest 98 (1998)
- Keep the Faith Tour (1999)
- Luv U Better Tour (2003)
- Game Changer Tour (2015)
- The 20th Anniversary Tour (2017)
- The 25th Anniversary Tour (Sisqo, Nokio, Jazz, Scola, Tao, Smoke, Black) (2022-2023)

As supporting act

- Evolution Tour (supporting Boyz II Men) (1998)

== Awards and nominations ==
- American Music Awards

Year	Nominee / work	Award	Result
1998	Dru Hill	Favorite Soul/R&B Band/Duo/Group	Nominated
1998	Dru Hill	Favorite Soul/R&B New Artist	Nominated
2000	Dru Hill	Favorite Soul/R&B Band/Duo/Group	Nominated
2003	Dru Hill	Favorite Soul/R&B Band/Duo/Group	Nominated

- Soul Train Music Awards

Year	Nominee / work	Award	Result
1998	Dru Hill	Best R&B/Soul Album – Group, Band or Duo	Won
1998	In My Bed	Best R&B/Soul Single – Group, Band or Duo	Won
1999	Enter the Dru	Best R&B/Soul Album – Group, Band or Duo	Nominated
2000	Beauty	Best R&B/Soul Single – Group, Band, or Duo	Nominated
2003	I Should Be...	Best R&B/Soul Single – Group, Band or Duo	Nominated

- Kids' Choice Awards

Year	Nominee / work	Award	Result
1999	Dru Hill	Favorite Group	Nominated
