= Billboard Year-End Hot R&B Singles of 1998 =

American music chart

This is a list of Billboard magazine's Top Hot R&B Singles of 1998.

No.	Title	Artist(s)
1	"Too Close"	Next
2	"They Don't Know" / "Are U Still Down"	Jon B.
3	"The Boy Is Mine"	Brandy and Monica
4	"No, No, No"	Destiny's Child
5	"Nice & Slow"	Usher
6	"Let's Ride"	Montell Jordan featuring Master P and Silkk the Shocker
7	"My Body"	LSG
8	"All My Life" / "Don't Rush (Take Love Slowly)"	K-Ci & JoJo
9	"I Don't Ever Want to See You Again"	Uncle Sam
10	"Friend of Mine"	Kelly Price
11	"It's All About Me"	Mýa and Sisqó
12	"A Song for Mama"	Boyz II Men
13	"I Get Lonely"	Janet Jackson featuring Blackstreet
14	"What You Want"	Mase featuring Total
15	"You Make Me Wanna..."	Usher
16	"Body Bumpin' (Yippie-Yi-Yo)"	Public Announcement
17	"Deja Vu (Uptown Baby)"	Lord Tariq and Peter Gunz
18	"Make It Hot"	Nicole featuring Missy Elliott and Mocha
19	"The First Night"	Monica
20	"We're Not Making Love No More"	Dru Hill
21	"Been Around the World" / "It's All About the Benjamins"	Puff Daddy featuring The Notorious B.I.G. and Mase
22	"A Rose Is Still a Rose"	Aretha Franklin
23	"The Arms of the One Who Loves You"	Xscape
24	"My All" / "Breakdown"	Mariah Carey
25	"Gone till November"	Wyclef Jean
26	"Swing My Way"	K. P. & Envyi
27	"Still Not a Player"	Big Pun featuring Joe
28	"Romeo and Juliet"	Sylk-E. Fyne featuring Chill
29	"My Way"	Usher
30	"What About Us"	Total
31	"Thinkin' Bout It"	Gerald Levert
32	"So Into You"	Tamia
33	"Lately"	Divine
34	"Am I Dreaming"	Ol' Skool
35	"Butta Love"	Next
36	"Movin' On"	Mya featuring Silkk the Shocker
37	"I Still Love You"	Next
38	"Nobody's Supposed to Be Here"	Deborah Cox
39	"Money, Power & Respect"	The Lox featuring DMX and Lil' Kim
40	"Dangerous"	Busta Rhymes
41	"Say It"	Voices of Theory
42	"Get at Me Dog"	DMX featuring Sheek Louch
43	"Cheers 2 U"	Playa
44	"Together Again"	Janet Jackson
45	"How Deep Is Your Love"	Dru Hill
46	"Do for Love"	2Pac featuring Eric Williams
47	"My Love Is the Shhh!"	Somethin' for the People featuring Trina & Tamara
48	"Make 'Em Say Uhh!"	Master P featuring Fiend, Silkk the Shocker, Mia X and Mystikal
49	"Victory"	Puff Daddy featuring The Notorious B.I.G. and Busta Rhymes
50	"Imagination"	Tamia
51	"Sock It 2 Me" / "The Rain (Supa Dupa Fly)"	Missy Elliott featuring Da Brat
52	"Money Ain't a Thang"	Jermaine Dupri featuring Jay-Z
53	"Feel So Good"	Mase
54	"Rain"	SWV
55	"Who Am I (Sim Simma)"	Beenie Man
56	"I Got the Hook Up"	Master P and Sons of Funk
57	"Daydreamin'"	Tatyana Ali
58	"Lookin' at Me"	Mase featuring Puff Daddy
59	"Horse & Carriage"	Cam'ron featuring Mase
60	"Ghetto Supastar (That Is What You Are)"	Pras Michel featuring Ol' Dirty Bastard and Mýa
61	"Strawberries"	Smooth
62	"The Party Continues"	Jermaine Dupri featuring Da Brat and Usher
63	"Touch It"	Monifah
64	"Bring It On"	Keith Washington
65	"I Gotta Be"	Jagged Edge
66	"Everything"	Mary J. Blige
67	"I Can Do That"	Montell Jordan
68	"Second Round K.O."	Canibus
69	"Do Your Thing"	7 Mile
70	"Raise the Roof"	Luke featuring No Good but So Good
71	"Off the Hook"	Jody Watley
72	"Gettin' Jiggy wit It"	Will Smith
73	"All I Do"	Somethin' for the People
74	"I Care 'Bout You"	Milestone
75	"Turn It Up (Remix) / Fire It Up"	Busta Rhymes
76	"My Little Secret"	Xscape
77	"I Wonder If Heaven Got a Ghetto"	2Pac
78	"How Do I Say I'm Sorry"	Tami Davis
79	"Doo Wop (That Thing)"	Lauryn Hill
80	"Father"	LL Cool J
81	"Whatcha Gonna Do"	Link
82	"Westside"	TQ
83	"The One I Gave My Heart To"	Aaliyah
84	"Just Clownin'"	WC
85	"All My Love"	Queen Pen featuring Eric Williams
86	"Can I Get A..."	Jay-Z featuring Ja Rule and Amil
87	"Nobody Else"	Tyrese
88	"Superthug"	Noreaga
89	"They Like It Slow"	H-Town
90	"How's It Goin' Down"	DMX featuring Faith Evans
91	"All the Places (I Will Kiss You)"	Aaron Hall
92	"Burn"	Militia
93	"Destiny"	Myron
94	"Splackavellie"	Pressha
95	"4 Seasons of Loneliness"	Boyz II Men
96	"4, 3, 2, 1"	LL Cool J featuring Method Man, Redman, Master P, DMX and Canibus
97	"Come and Get with Me"	Keith Sweat featuring Snoop Dogg
98	"In Harm's Way"	BeBe Winans
99	"Still a G Thang"	Snoop Dogg
100	"If You Think I'm Jiggy"	The Lox

== See also ==
- 1998 in music
- Billboard Year-End Hot 100 singles of 1998
- Billboard Year-End Hot Rap Singles of 1998
- List of number-one R&B singles of 1998 (U.S.)
