= List of Billboard Hot 100 top-ten singles in 1998 =

This is a list of singles that charted in the top ten of the Billboard Hot 100 during 1998.

Mase scored four top ten hits during the year with "Feel So Good", "Been Around the World" / "It's All About the Benjamins", "What You Want", and "Lookin' at Me", the most among all other artists.

== Top-ten singles ==
Key

- ↑ – indicates single's top 10 entry was also its Hot 100 debut
- † – indicates Best performing song of the year
- (#) – 1998 Year-end top 10 single position and rank (Despite not reaching the top 10 on the Billboard Hot 100 peaking at #11, I Don't Want to Wait by Paula Cole reached #10 on the Year-end Hot 100 single chart of 1998.)

List of Billboard Hot 100 top ten singles which peaked in 1998
Top ten entry date	Single	Artist(s)	Peak	Peak date	Weeks in top ten
Singles from 1997
December 13	"Been Around the World" / "It's All About the Benjamins"	Puff Daddy featuring The Notorious B.I.G. and Mase	2	January 3	12
December 20	"Together Again" (#6) ↑	Janet Jackson	1	January 31	14
December 27	"Truly Madly Deeply" (#4)	Savage Garden	1	January 17	26
Singles from 1998
January 3	"A Song for Mama"	Boyz II Men	7	February 14	6
January 24	"Nice & Slow" (#9) ↑	Usher	1	February 14	14
January 31	"I Don't Ever Want to See You Again"	Uncle Sam	6	February 7	6
February 7	"Dangerous"	Busta Rhymes	9	February 7	2
February 14	"No, No, No Part II"	Destiny's Child featuring Wyclef Jean	3	March 28	8
February 14	"How's It Going to Be"	Third Eye Blind	9	February 14	1
February 21	"Too Much"	Spice Girls	9	February 21	1
February 21	"What You Want"	Mase featuring Total	6	March 21	5
February 28	"My Heart Will Go On" ↑	Céline Dion	1	February 28	8
February 28	"Gettin' Jiggy wit It" ↑	Will Smith	1	March 14	6
March 7	"Swing My Way"	K. P. & Envyi	6	March 14	3
March 14	"Gone Till November"	Wyclef Jean	7	March 21	6
March 21	"Frozen" ↑	Madonna	2	April 4	8
March 28	"Let's Ride"	Montell Jordan featuring Master P and Silkk the Shocker	2	April 11	8
March 28	"Deja Vu (Uptown Baby)"	Lord Tariq and Peter Gunz	9	March 28	2
April 4	"All My Life" (#7)	K-Ci & JoJo	1	April 4	12
April 4	"Too Close" † (#1)	Next	1	April 25	23
April 11	"Romeo and Juliet"	Sylk-E. Fyne featuring Chill	6	April 18	4
April 18	"Sex and Candy"	Marcy Playground	8	April 18	4
April 25	"You're Still the One" (#3)	Shania Twain	2	May 2	23
April 25	"Body Bumpin' (Yippie-Yi-Yo)"	Public Announcement	5	May 16	6
May 2	"Everybody (Backstreet's Back)"	Backstreet Boys	4	May 9	12
May 9	"My All" ↑	Mariah Carey	1	May 23	12
May 9	"Turn It Up" ↑	Busta Rhymes	10	May 9	1
May 16	"It's All About Me"	Mýa featuring Sisqó	6	May 16	4
May 16	"The Arms of the One Who Loves You"	Xscape	7	May 30	5
May 23	"I Get Lonely" ↑	Janet Jackson featuring Blackstreet	3	May 23	7
June 6	"The Boy Is Mine" (#2)	Brandy and Monica	1	June 6	18
June 20	"They Don't Know"	Jon B	7	June 20	4
June 20	"Adia"	Sarah McLachlan	3	August 22	13
June 27	"My Way"	Usher	2	August 15	16
June 27	"Come with Me" ↑	Puff Daddy featuring Jimmy Page	4	July 25	8
July 11	"Ray of Light" ↑	Madonna	5	July 11	4
July 18	"Make It Hot"	Nicole featuring Missy Elliott and Mocha	5	August 1	6
July 25	"Say It"	Voices of Theory	10	July 25	1
August 1	"Never Ever"	All Saints	4	August 22	7
August 1	"When the Lights Go Out"	Five	10	August 1	7
August 8	"Crush"	Jennifer Paige	3	September 5	17
August 22	"The First Night"	Monica	1	October 3	16
August 22	"Cruel Summer"	Ace of Base	10	August 22	2
August 29	"Daydreamin'"	Tatyana Ali	6	September 12	6
September 5	"I Don't Want to Miss a Thing" ↑	Aerosmith	1	September 5	10
September 12	"Lookin' at Me"	Mase featuring Puff Daddy	8	September 19	2
September 19	"Time After Time"	INOJ	6	September 26	5
September 26	"I'll Be" ↑	Edwin McCain	5	October 3	10
October 3	"One Week" ↑	Barenaked Ladies	1	October 17	9
October 10	"How Deep is Your Love" ↑	Dru Hill featuring Redman	3	October 24	9
October 10	"This Kiss"	Faith Hill	7	October 10	8
October 17	"Because of You"	98 Degrees	3	November 21	14
October 17	"Touch It"	Monifah	9	October 17	1
October 24	"My Little Secret" ↑	Xscape	9	October 24	2
October 24	"Lately"	Divine	1	November 28	14
November 7	"Nobody's Supposed to Be Here"	Deborah Cox	2	December 5	20
November 14	"Doo Wop (That Thing)" ↑	Lauryn Hill	1	November 14	11
December 5	"From This Moment On"	Shania Twain	4	December 19	6
December 5	"I'm Your Angel"	Céline Dion and R. Kelly	1	December 5	10
December 5	"Iris"	Goo Goo Dolls	9	December 5	1
December 5	"Love Like This"	Faith Evans	7	December 12	6

=== 1997 peaks ===
List of Billboard Hot 100 top ten singles in 1998 which peaked in 1997
Top ten entry date	Single	Artist(s)	Peak	Peak date	Weeks in top ten
August 9	"How Do I Live" (#5)	LeAnn Rimes	2	December 13	32
September 6	"You Make Me Wanna..."	Usher	2	October 25	23
October 11	"Candle in the Wind 1997/Something About the Way You Look Tonight" (#8) ↑	Elton John	1	October 11	17
November 1	"Tubthumping"	Chumbawamba	6	November 29	12
November 15	"My Body"	LSG	4	December 6	11
November 22	"Feel So Good"	Mase	5	December 13	9
November 29	"Show Me Love"	Robyn	7	November 29	10

=== 1999 peaks ===
List of Billboard Hot 100 top ten singles in 1998 which peaked in 1999
Top ten entry date	Single	Artist(s)	Peak	Peak date	Weeks in top ten
December 12	"Have You Ever?"	Brandy	1	January 16	13
December 12	"...Baby One More Time"	Britney Spears	1	January 30	14
December 12	"Lullaby"	Shawn Mullins	7	January 16	6

== See also ==
- 1998 in music
- List of Billboard Hot 100 number ones of 1998
- Billboard Year-End Hot 100 singles of 1998
