= Billboard Year-End Hot 100 singles of 1998 =

Ranking of recorded music

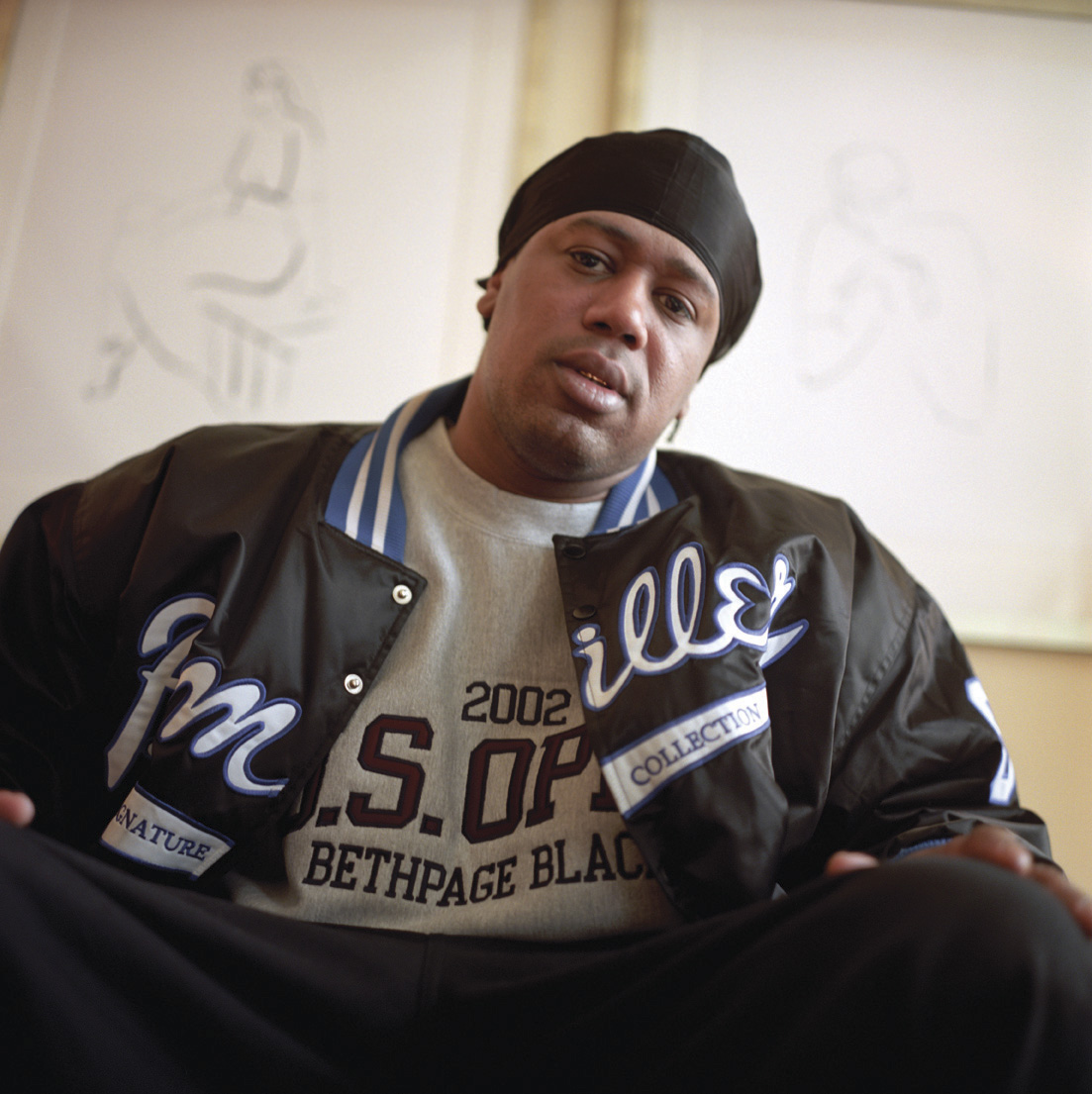
Master P (pictured) had three songs on the Year-End list, tying with Next, Busta Rhymes, and Usher as having the second-most songs. His song "Make 'Em Say Uhh!" and his feature on Montell Jordan's "Let's Ride" both appear in the top-40.

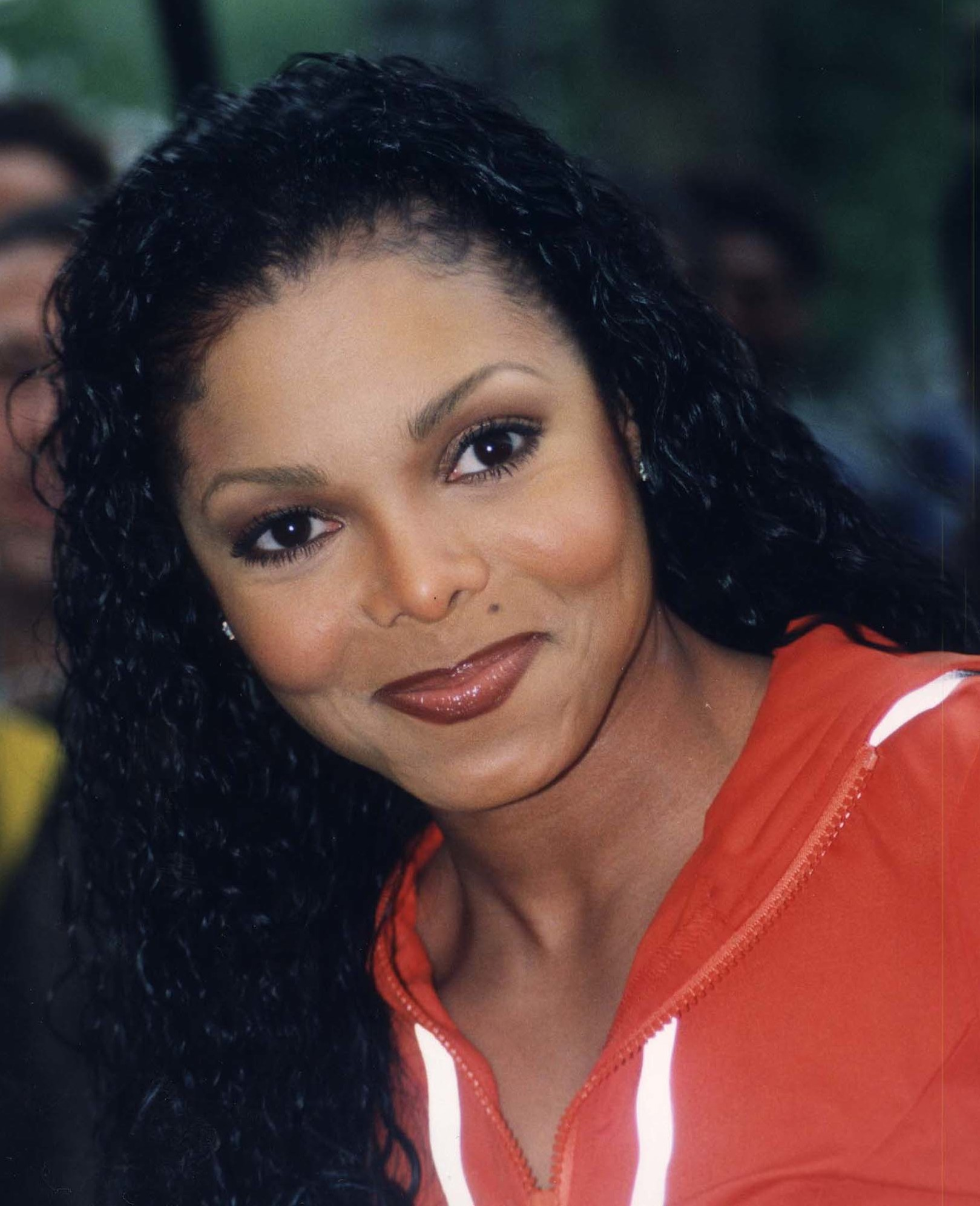
"Together Again" by Janet (pictured) placed at number six on the Year-End list after topping the Hot 100 for two weeks, while her song "I Get Lonely" featuring Blackstreet was included at number 43.

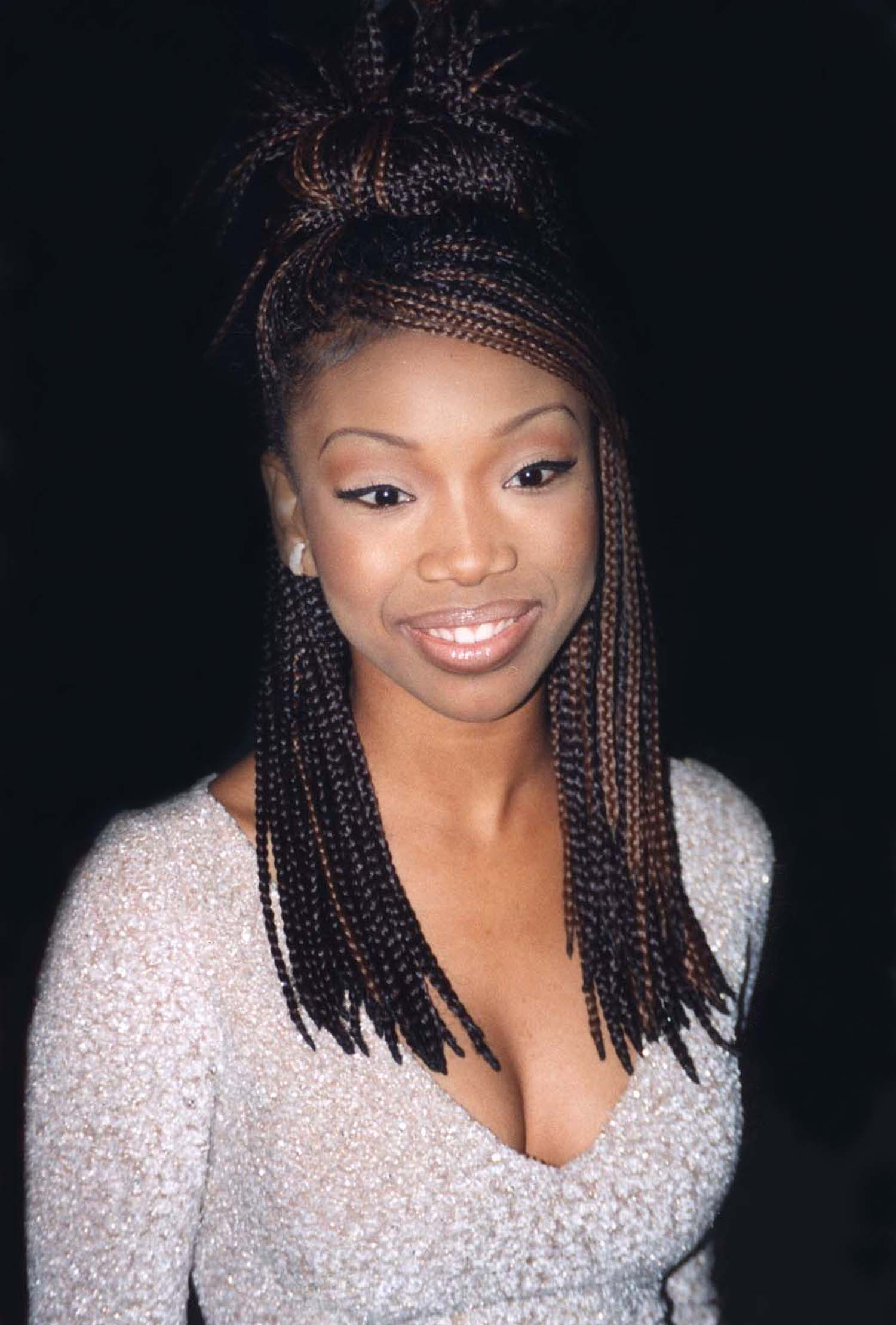
"The Boy Is Mine", a duet between Brandy (pictured) and Monica, was the number two song on the Year-End list.

This is a list of Billboard magazine's Top Hot 100 songs of 1998.

№	Title	Artist(s)
1	"Too Close"	Next
2	"The Boy Is Mine"	Brandy and Monica
3	"You're Still the One"	Shania Twain
4	"Truly Madly Deeply"	Savage Garden
5	"How Do I Live"	LeAnn Rimes
6	"Together Again"	Janet
7	"All My Life"	K-Ci & JoJo
8	"Candle in the Wind 1997" / "Something About the Way You Look Tonight"	Elton John
9	"Nice & Slow"	Usher
10	"I Don't Want to Wait"	Paula Cole
11	"How's It Going to Be"	Third Eye Blind
12	"No, No, No"	Destiny's Child
13	"My Heart Will Go On"	Celine Dion
14	"Gettin' Jiggy wit It"	Will Smith
15	"You Make Me Wanna..."	Usher
16	"My Way"	Usher
17	"My All"	Mariah Carey
18	"The First Night"	Monica
19	"Been Around the World"	Puff Daddy featuring The Notorious B.I.G. and Mase
20	"Adia"	Sarah McLachlan
21	"Crush"	Jennifer Paige
22	"Everybody (Backstreet's Back)"	Backstreet Boys
23	"I Don't Want to Miss a Thing"	Aerosmith
24	"Body Bumpin' (Yippie-Yi-Yo)"	Public Announcement
25	"This Kiss"	Faith Hill
26	"I Don't Ever Want to See You Again"	Uncle Sam
27	"Let's Ride"	Montell Jordan featuring Master P and Silkk the Shocker
28	"Sex and Candy"	Marcy Playground
29	"Show Me Love"	Robyn
30	"A Song for Mama"	Boyz II Men
31	"What You Want"	Mase featuring Total
32	"Frozen"	Madonna
33	"Gone till November"	Wyclef Jean
34	"My Body"	LSG
35	"Tubthumping"	Chumbawamba
36	"Deja Vu (Uptown Baby)"	Lord Tariq and Peter Gunz
37	"I Want You Back"	NSYNC
38	"When the Lights Go Out"	Five
39	"They Don't Know"	Jon B.
40	"Make 'Em Say Uhh!"	Master P featuring Fiend, Silkk the Shocker, Mia X and Mystikal
41	"Make It Hot"	Nicole featuring Missy Elliott and Mocha
42	"Never Ever"	All Saints
43	"I Get Lonely"	Janet featuring Blackstreet
44	"Feel So Good"	Mase
45	"Say It"	Voices of Theory
46	"Kiss the Rain"	Billie Myers
47	"Come with Me"	Puff Daddy featuring Jimmy Page
48	"Romeo and Juliet"	Sylk-E. Fyne featuring Chill
49	"It's All About Me"	Mýa and Sisqo
50	"I Will Come to You"	Hanson
51	"One Week"	Barenaked Ladies
52	"Swing My Way"	K. P. & Envyi
53	"The Arms of the One Who Loves You"	Xscape
54	"My Love Is the Shhh!"	Somethin' for the People featuring Trina & Tamara
55	"Daydreamin'"	Tatyana Ali
56	"We're Not Making Love No More"	Dru Hill
57	"Semi-Charmed Life"	Third Eye Blind
58	"I Do"	Lisa Loeb
59	"Lookin' at Me"	Mase featuring Puff Daddy
60	"Looking Through Your Eyes"	LeAnn Rimes
61	"Lately"	Divine
62	"Quit Playing Games (With My Heart)"	Backstreet Boys
63	"I Still Love You"	Next
64	"Time After Time"	INOJ
65	"Are You Jimmy Ray?"	Jimmy Ray
66	"Cruel Summer"	Ace of Base
67	"I Got the Hook Up"	Master P featuring Sons of Funk
68	"Victory"	Puff Daddy & the Family featuring The Notorious B.I.G. and Busta Rhymes
69	"Too Much"	Spice Girls
70	"Ghetto Supastar (That Is What You Are)"	Pras Michel featuring Ol' Dirty Bastard and Mýa
71	"How Deep Is Your Love"	Dru Hill featuring Redman
72	"Friend of Mine"	Kelly Price
73	"Turn It Up (Remix)/Fire It Up"	Busta Rhymes
74	"I'll Be"	Edwin McCain
75	"Ray of Light"	Madonna
76	"All for You"	Sister Hazel
77	"Touch It"	Monifah
78	"Money, Power & Respect"	The Lox featuring DMX and Lil' Kim
79	"Bitter Sweet Symphony"	The Verve
80	"Dangerous"	Busta Rhymes
81	"Spice Up Your Life"	Spice Girls
82	"Because of You"	98 Degrees
83	"The Mummers' Dance"	Loreena McKennitt
84	"All Cried Out"	Allure featuring 112
85	"Still Not a Player"	Big Punisher featuring Joe
86	"The One I Gave My Heart To"	Aaliyah
87	"Foolish Games" / "You Were Meant for Me"	Jewel
88	"Love You Down"	INOJ
89	"Do for Love"	2Pac featuring Eric Williams
90	"Raise the Roof"	Luke featuring No Good But So Good
91	"Heaven"	Nu Flavor
92	"The Party Continues"	JD featuring Da Brat
93	"Sock It 2 Me"	Missy Elliott featuring Da Brat
94	"Butta Love"	Next
95	"A Rose Is Still a Rose"	Aretha Franklin
96	"4 Seasons of Loneliness"	Boyz II Men
97	"Father"	LL Cool J
98	"Thinkin' Bout It"	Gerald Levert
99	"Nobody's Supposed to Be Here"	Deborah Cox
100	"Westside"	TQ

== See also ==
- 1998 in music
- Billboard Year-End Hot R&B Singles of 1998
- Billboard Year-End Hot Rap Singles of 1998
- List of Billboard Hot 100 number-one singles of 1998
- List of Billboard Hot 100 top 10 singles in 1998
