= Billboard Year-End Hot Rap Singles of 1998 =

American music chart

This is a list of Billboard magazine's Top Hot Rap Singles of 1998.

No.	Title	Artist(s)
1	"Deja Vu (Uptown Baby)"	Lord Tariq and Peter Gunz
2	"Gone till November"	Wyclef Jean
3	"What You Want"	Mase featuring Total
4	"Been Around the World" / "It's All About the Benjamins"	Puff Daddy featuring Mase and The Notorious B.I.G.
5	"Romeo and Juliet"	Sylk-E. Fyne featuring Chill
6	"Get at Me Dog"	DMX featuring Sheek Louch
7	"Victory"	Puff Daddy featuring Busta Rhymes and The Notorious B.I.G.
8	"Money, Power & Respect"	The Lox featuring DMX and Lil' Kim
9	"Make 'Em Say Uhh!"	Master P featuring Fiend, Silkk the Shocker, Mia X and Mystikal
10	"Swing My Way"	K. P. & Envyi
11	"Raise the Roof"	Luke featuring No Good but So Good
12	"The Party Continues"	Jermaine Dupri featuring Da Brat and Usher
13	"Second Round K.O."	Canibus
14	"Father"	LL Cool J
15	"Dangerous"	Busta Rhymes
16	"Do for Love"	2Pac
17	"Gettin' Jiggy wit It"	Will Smith
18	"Turn It Up (Remix) / Fire It Up"	Busta Rhymes
19	"Lookin' at Me"	Mase featuring Puff Daddy
20	"Feel So Good"	Mase
21	"I Got the Hook Up"	Master P featuring Sons of Funk
22	"Who Am I (Sim Simma)"	Beenie Man
23	"Just Clownin'"	WC
24	"Gitty Up"	Salt-n-Pepa
25	"I'm Not a Player"	Big Pun
26	"Burn"	Militia
27	"Ninety Nine (Flash the Message)"	John Forté
28	"Come with Me"	Puff Daddy featuring Jimmy Page
29	"Woof Woof"	69 Boyz
30	"2 Live Party"	2 Live Crew featuring KC and Freak Nasty
31	"Superthug"	Noreaga
32	"Throw Yo Hood Up"	Mr. Money Loc featuring Above the Law
33	"What U See Is What U Get"	Xzibit
34	"Doo Wop (That Thing)"	Lauryn Hill
35	"Sky's the Limit" / "Going Back to Cali"	The Notorious B.I.G. featuring 112
36	"If You Think I'm Jiggy"	The Lox
37	"Clock Strikes"	Timbaland & Magoo
38	"Just Be Straight with Me"	Silkk the Shocker featuring Master P and Destiny's Child
39	"Bananas (Who You Gonna Call?)"	Queen Latifah featuring Apache
40	"The Actual"	All City
41	"Still a G Thang"	Snoop Dogg
42	"The City Is Mine"	Jay-Z
43	"Choke"	B.H.L.U.N.T.
44	"Definition"	Black Star
45	"Nothin' Move But the Money" (remix)	Mic Geronimo featuring Black Rob and DMX
46	"Still Po Pimpin'"	Do or Die featuring Twista and Johnny P.
47	"You Know My Steez"	Gang Starr
48	"Roxanne '97"	Sting and The Police featuring Pras
49	"Just the Two of Us"	Will Smith
50	"Do You"	Heather B.

== See also ==
- 1998 in music
- Billboard Year-End Hot 100 singles of 1998
- Billboard Year-End Hot R&B Singles of 1998
- List of Billboard number-one rap singles of 1998
