= Uncle (disambiguation) =

An uncle is a family relative and, in some cultures, is used as a term of familiarity or respect for a middle-aged or elderly man.

Uncle, UNCLE or The Uncle may also refer to:

== Film and TV ==
- U.N.C.L.E., (United Network Command for Law and Enforcement), a fictional organization in the TV series The Man from U.N.C.L.E.
- Uncle (British TV series), a BBC Three sitcom
- Uncle (2000 film), an Indian Telugu drama film
- Uncle (2018 film), an Indian Malayalam drama thriller film
- Uncle (2019 film), a Danish film
- Uncle (South Korean TV series), a 2021 television series
- Uncle, a 2023 Taiwanese television series starring Wang Shih-hsien and Ray Chang
- The Uncle (1966 film), a British drama film
- The Uncle (2022 film), a Croatian psychological thriller

== Other uses ==
- "Uncle", a song by Mindless Self Indulgence on the album If (2008)
- "Uncle", a song by Kanye West from his unreleased album Cuck
- Uncle, a term sometimes used to address an Australian Aboriginal elder (of any age)
- a term used in Thailand–Cambodia phone call leak to refer to Hun Sen
- Uncle (book series), by J. P. Martin
  - Uncle (novel), a children's novel by J. P. Martin
- Uncle, a character in the Red Dead video game series

== See also ==
- Uncle Jammu, a Finnish child murderer
- Uncle Remus (disambiguation), a folktale of the southern United States
- Uncle Sam (disambiguation), national personification of the U.S. federal government
- Unkle, a British musical outfit
- Say Uncle (disambiguation), an expression of speech in the United States and Canada
- Auntie (disambiguation)
