= Uncle Sam (disambiguation) =

Uncle Sam is an iconic figure and a national personification of the United States of America.

Uncle Sam may also refer to:

- Uncle Sam (comics), Quality Comics/DC Comics character
- Uncle Sam (Vertigo), two-part comic book series by Steve Darnall and Alex Ross
- Uncle Sam (diamond), the largest diamond ever discovered in the United States
- Uncle Sam (film), a 1996-7 horror film
- Uncle Sam (singer) (born 1971), American R&B singer
  - Uncle Sam (album), 1997 (january)
- "Uncle Sam" (song) by Madness
- Uncle Sam Cereal, a ready-to eat breakfast cereal
- Uncle Sam (1852 sidewheeler), a side-wheel paddle steamer tug, first steamboat to ascend the Colorado River
- Uncle Sam, a brand of toothpaste and deodorant sold in the 1970s in Australia
- Uncle Samsonite, an Internet horror/comedy webseries won 4 film of the year awards.

== Place ==
- Uncle Sam, California, former name of Kelseyville, California
- Uncle Sam, Louisiana, former name of Independence, Louisiana
- Uncle Sam Plantation, a historic brown sugar plantation
