= Hot, Hot, Hot (LL Cool J song) =

Single by LL Cool J

from the album Phenomenon
- B-side: "4, 3, 2, 1"
- Released: March 27, 1998
- Genre: Hip hop
- Length: 4:22
- Label: Def Jam
- Songwriter: James Todd Smith
- Producer: The Hitmen

LL Cool J singles chronology
| "Father" (1998) | "Hot, Hot, Hot" (1998) | "Zoom" (1998) |

"Hot, Hot, Hot" is a song by American rapper LL Cool J, released as the fourth single from his seventh album Phenomenon. It was released on March 27, 1998, through Def Jam Recordings and was produced by Puff Daddy, D-Dot and Amen-Ra of the production team, The Hitmen. The bassline is sampled from the song "Pleasure of Love" by Tom Tom Club.

A video was created for the song, but was considered inferior and never released.

== Track listing ==
=== A-side ===
1. "Hot, Hot, Hot" (radio edit) – 4:00
2. "Hot, Hot, Hot" (radio remix) – 3:44

=== B-side ===
1. "4, 3, 2, 1" (E-Dub Remix featuring DMX, Method Man and Redman) – 3:38
2. "Hot, Hot, Hot" (remix) – 3:52

== Charts ==
Chart performance for "Hot Hot Hot"
| Chart (1998) | Peak position |
|---|---|
| Australia (ARIA) | 83 |
| Belgium (Ultratip Bubbling Under Flanders) | 12 |
| Germany (GfK) | 48 |
| Netherlands (Dutch Top 40 Tipparade) | 9 |
| Netherlands (Single Top 100) | 74 |
| New Zealand (Recorded Music NZ) | 13 |
| Sweden (Sverigetopplistan) | 56 |
