= Aunt =

Female relative who is sibling of one's parent

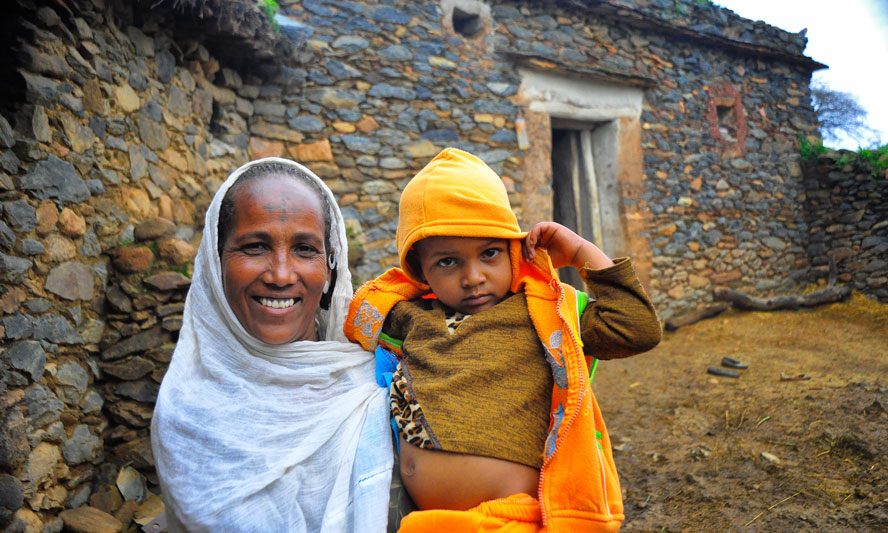
An aunt and her niece in Tigray, Ethiopia

An aunt is a female individual who is a sibling of a parent or married to a sibling of a parent. Aunts who are related by birth are second-degree relatives. Alternate terms include auntie or aunty.

Aunt, auntie, and aunty also may be titles bestowed by parents and children to close friends of one or both parents who assume a sustained caring or nurturing role for the children. Children in some cultures and families may refer to the cousins of their parents as aunt or uncle due to the age and generation gap. The word comes from Latin: amita via Old French ante and is a family relationship within an extended or immediate family.

The male counterpart of an aunt is an uncle, and the reciprocal relationship is that of a nephew or niece. The gender-neutral neologism pibling, a shortened form of parent's sibling, is used for both aunts and uncles.

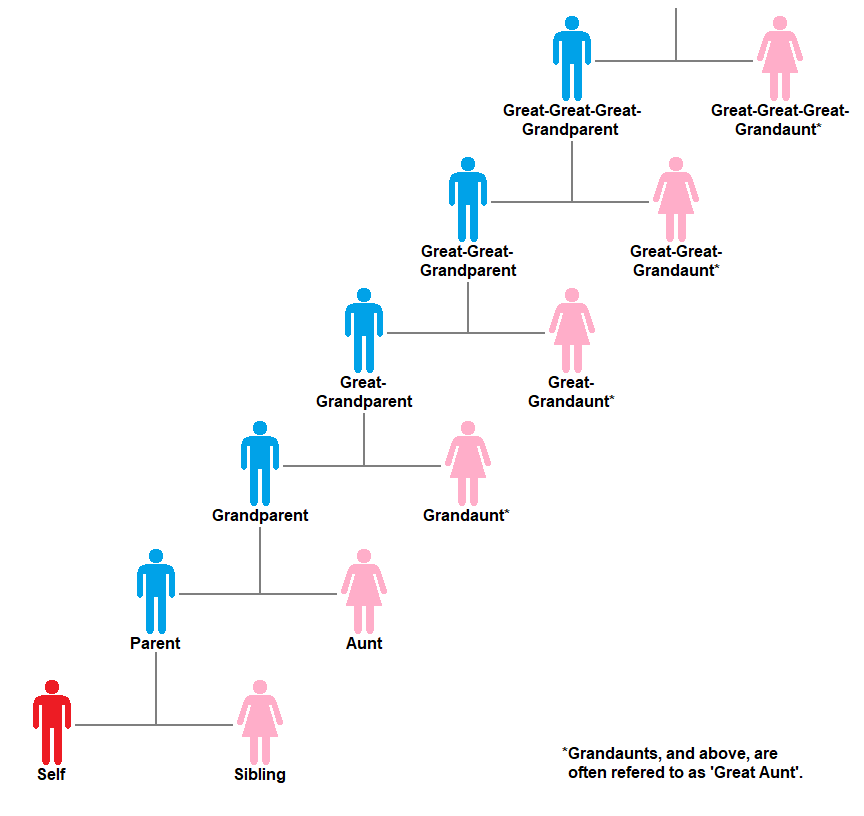
Aunts by generation

== Types ==
- A half-aunt is a half-sister of a parent.
- A maternal aunt is the sister of one's mother.
- A paternal aunt is the sister of one's father.
- An aunt-in-law is the wife or female partner of one's uncle.
- A parent's first cousin may be called a second aunt.
- A great-aunt or grandaunt (sometimes written grand-aunt) is the sister of one's grandparent.
- A double half-aunt is the half-sister of one's both parents. She is the daughter of one's paternal grandfather and maternal grandmother or of one's paternal grandmother and maternal grandfather.

== Genetics and consanguinity ==
Aunts by birth (sister of a parent) are related to their nieces and nephews by 25%. As half-aunts are related through half-sisters, they are related by 12.5% to their nieces and nephews. Non-consanguineous aunts (female spouse of a relative) are not genetically related to their nieces and nephews.

== Cultural variations ==
In some cultures, such as Aboriginal and Torres Strait Islander peoples of Australia, respected senior members of the community, often also referred to as elders, are addressed as "uncle" (for men) and "aunt" for women, as a mark of seniority and respect, whether related or not, such as Aunty Kathy Mills.

In several cultures, no single inclusive term describing both a person's kinship to their parental female sibling or parental female in-law exists. Instead, there are specific terms describing a person's kinship to their mother's female sibling, and a person's kinship to their father's female sibling, per the following table:

Terms for aunt
Language	Mother's sister	Father's sister
Albanian	teze	hallë
Kurdish	Xaltîk (IPA: xɑːltiːk)	Metik (IPA: mɛtɪk)
Arabic	خالة (khālah)	عمّة (ʿammah)
Assamese	Mahi	Pehi
Bengali	Mashi, খালা (khala) (Note: Muslims, not Hindus)	Pishi, ফুফু (phuphu) (Note: Muslims, not Hindus)
Finnish	Täti	Täti
Hindi	Mausi	Bua
Korean	이모 (Imo)	고모 (Gomo)
Marathi	Mavashi	Aatya
Persian	(خاله)khaleh	(عمّه)ammeh
Polish	ciocia (diminutive: ciotka)	stryjna (diminutive: stryjenka)
Swedish	moster	faster
Turkish	teyze	hala
Ukrainian	вуйна / vujna	стрийна / stryjna

== In popular culture ==
Aunts in popular culture have not always been portrayed as positive roles. Childless aunts are often subjected to othering in popular culture and presented as exotic or as having a second-best role, with motherhood preferred.

Aunt Flo is a popular euphemism referring to the menstrual cycle.

In the United Kingdom, An agony aunt is a colloquial term for a female advice columnist.

== See also ==
- – includes many articles with titles "Aunt [name]."
- Auntie (disambiguation) (also includes "Aunty")
