= Raw Sylk =

Studio album by Sylk-E. Fyne
- Released: March 24, 1998
- Recorded: 1997–98
- Genre: Hip hop
- Length: 46:35
- Label: RCA
- Producer: Gerald Baillergeau; Victor Merritt

Sylk-E. Fyne chronology
| Raw Sylk (1998) | Tha Cum Up (2000) |

Singles from Raw Sylk
- 1. "Romeo And Juliet" Released: 1997

Raw Sylk is the debut studio album by American rapper Sylk-E. Fyne. It was released on March 24, 1998, through RCA Records, with Gerald 'Big Yam' Baillergeau and Victor 'Vino' Merritt producing the entire album.

The album is best remembered for its lead single "Romeo and Juliet", a duet with William "Chill" Warner. The song peaked at No. 6 on the Billboard Hot 100 and No. 1 on the Hot Rap Singles and reached gold status two months after its release.

The album, however, did not match "Romeo and Juliet's" success, only making it to 121 on the Billboard 200 and 47 on the R&B charts. The album's failure eventually led to RCA dropping Sylk-E. Fyne from the label.

== Critical reception ==
Professional ratings
Review scores
| Source | Rating |
|---|---|
| AllMusic | 3/5 stars |
| Knoxville News Sentinel | 1/5 stars |

The Knoxville News Sentinel concluded that "Johnson proves herself a wretchedly dull rapper on her debut, with numbing rhythm loops as the only instrumental support to speak of."

== Track listing ==
| No. | Title | Writer(s) | Length |
|---|---|---|---|
| 1. | "Keep It Real" (featuring Too $hort) | L. Johnson; T. Shaw; G. Baillergeau; V. Merritt | 4:02 |
| 2. | "Romeo And Juliet" (featuring Chill) | L. Johnson; W. Warner Jr.; G. Baillergeau; V. Merritt; R. Moore; A. Winbush | 4:35 |
| 3. | "Grand Jury (Coming Through)" | L. Johnson; G. Baillergeau; V. Merritt; R. Moore; A. Winbush | 2:46 |
| 4. | "Material Girl" | L. Johnson; G. Baillergeau; V. Merritt; R. Troutman; J. Woods | 4:18 |
| 5. | "I Missed My Loved Ones" | L. Johnson; J. Woods; G. Baillergeau; V. Merritt | 5:03 |
| 6. | "They'll Never Be" | L. Johnson; V. Merritt; G. Baillergeau | 4:04 |
| 7. | "I Ain't Down With The System" | L. Johnson; G. Baillergeau; V. Merritt | 4:22 |
| 8. | "Love No More (Look Into My Eyes)" | L. Johnson; V. Merritt; G. Baillergeau | 4:49 |
| 9. | "Lost In The Game" | L. Johnson; G. Baillergeau; V. Merritt | 4:02 |
| 10. | "I Make Moves" | L. Johnson; V. Merritt; G. Baillergeau | 4:34 |
| 11. | "This Is The Way We Roll" | L. Johnson; G. Baillergeau; V. Merritt | 3:55 |
| 12. | "Sylk-E.'s Romeo And Juliet (LA Groove)" (featuring Chill) | V. Merritt; G. Baillergeau; L. Johnson | 4:34 |
| Total length: | | | 46:35 |

== Samples ==
- "Romeo And Juliet"
  - "Theme From Mahogany (Do You Know Where You're Going To) by Diana Ross
  - "You Don't Have to Cry" by Rene & Angela
- "Grand Jury (Coming Through)"
  - "I'll Be Good" by Rene & Angela
- "Material Girl"
  - "More Bounce to the Ounce" by Zapp
- "I Ain't Down With The System"
  - "Ready or Not Here I Come (Can't Hide from Love)" by The Delfonics
- "Sylk-E.'s Romeo And Juliet (LA Groove)"
  - "Sun Is Here" by Sun

== Personnel ==
- Gerald Baillergeau - producer, executive producer
- Mike Concepcion - executive producer
- Tony Dawsey - mastering
- Kevin Evans - executive producer, A&R
- La'Mar Lorraine Johnson - main artist, vocals
- Freddie Lee - associate executive producer
- Dorothy Low - photography
- Victor Merritt - associate executive producer, producer, mixing
- Craig Nobles - associate executive producer
- Todd Anthony Shaw - featured artist, vocals
- William Warner Jr. - featured artist, vocals
- Jerome Woods - featured artist, vocals

== Charts ==
| Chart (1998) | Peak position |
|---|---|
| Billboard 200 | 121 |
| Billboard Top R&B/Hip-Hop Albums | 47 |
| Billboard Top Heatseekers | 2 |
