= Tha Cum Up =

Studio album by Sylk-E. Fyne
- Released: July 11, 2000
- Genre: Hip hop
- Length: 47:58
- Label: Rufftown Records
- Producer: Bruce Swedien; Rene Swedien

Sylk-E. Fyne chronology
Raw Sylk (1998)	Tha Cum Up (2000)

Tha Cum Up is the second studio album by American rapper Sylk-E. Fyne. It was released on July 11, 2000, via Rufftown Records. The ten track record featured guest appearances from Nicole Renée, JT Money, Bizzy Bone, Phantom Smoove, Chill, and Snoop Dogg.

Professional ratings
Review scores
Source	Rating
Allmusic	2/5 stars

After her successful debut, Raw Sylk, expectations were high but Tha Cum Up was a critical and commercial failure, however, the single "Ya Style", featuring Snoop Dogg and Bizzy Bone, made it to #17 on the Hot Rap Singles.

== Track listing ==
No.	Title	Length
1.	"I'mma Give It To Ya"	5:05
2.	"How Hot" (featuring Chill)	4:55
3.	"Dirty South Central"	4:27
4.	"Players Comin' Up" (featuring Phantom Smoove)	4:19
5.	"Lick It"	4:27
6.	"My Life"	5:06
7.	"Tha Cum Up" (featuring JT Money)	5:01
8.	"Dirty Game" (featuring Nicole Renée)	4:36
9.	"Ya Style" (featuring Snoop Doggy Dogg & Bizzy Bone)	5:27
10.	"Why Oh Why"	4:35
Total length:		47:58

== Personnel ==
- Calvin Broadus - featured artist (track 9)
- La'Mar Lorraine Johnson - main artist
- Bryon Anthony McCane II - featured artist (track 9)
- Nicole Renée - featured artist (track 8)
- Bruce Swedien - producer
- Rene Swedien - producer
- Jeff Thompkins - featured artist (track 7)
- Jonathan West - featured artist (track 6)
- Chill - featured artist (track 2)
- Phantom Smoove - featured artist (track 4)
