= Phenomenon (LL Cool J song) =

1997 single by LL Cool J

Single by LL Cool J

from the album Phenomenon
- B-side: "Hot Hot Hot"
- Released: September 30, 1997
- Length: 4:12
- Label: Def Jam
- Songwriters: James Todd Smith; Sean Combs; Ron Amen-Ra Lawrence; Stanley McKenney; William Withers
- Producers: Sean "Puffy" Combs; Ron Amen-Ra Lawrence

LL Cool J singles chronology
"Ain't Nobody" (1997)	"Phenomenon" (1997)	"4, 3, 2, 1" (1997)

"Phenomenon" is the a song by American rapper LL Cool J, released as the lead single from his seventh studio album, Phenomenon (1997). It samples the Creative Source cover of "Who Is He (And What Is He to You)?" by Bill Withers. Released in September 1997, "Phenomenon" peaked at number 55 on the US Billboard Hot 100, reached number nine on the UK Singles Chart, and charted within the top 20 in the Netherlands and New Zealand.

== Track listings ==
US 12-inch single

A1. "Phenomenon" (radio edit)
A2. "Phenomenon" (LP version)
A3. "Phenomenon" (instrumental)
B1. "Hot Hot Hot" (radio edit)
B2. "Hot Hot Hot" (LP version)
B3. "Hot Hot Hot" (instrumental)

UK and European CD single

1. "Phenomenon" (radio edit) – 3:06
2. "Wanna Get Paid" (featuring the Lost Boyz) – 4:10
3. "Mama Said Knock You Out" – 4:48
4. "Phenomenon" (LP version) – 4:12

Australasian CD single

1. "Phenomenon" (radio edit) – 3:06
2. "Phenomenon" (LP version) – 4:12
3. "Phenomenon" (instrumental) – 4:12
4. "Phenomenon" (TV) – 4:03

== Charts ==
=== Weekly charts ===
Weekly chart performance for "Phenomenon"
Chart (1997–1998)	Peak position
Australia (ARIA)	29
Belgium (Ultratop 50 Flanders)	31
Belgium (Ultratop 50 Wallonia)	34
Canada Top Singles (RPM)	27
Canada Dance/Urban (RPM)	1
Europe (Eurochart Hot 100)	42
Germany (GfK)	43
Iceland (Íslenski Listinn Topp 40)	25
Ireland (IRMA)	28
Netherlands (Dutch Top 40)	16
Netherlands (Single Top 100)	21
New Zealand (Recorded Music NZ)	11
Scottish Singles Sales (Official Charts)	25
Sweden (Sverigetopplistan)	29
Switzerland (Schweizer Hitparade)	22
UK Singles (Official Charts)	9
UK Dance (Official Charts)	9
UK Hip Hop/R&B (Official Charts)	1
US Billboard Hot 100	55
US Dance Singles Sales (Billboard)	7
US Hot R&B/Hip-Hop Songs (Billboard)	16
US Hot Rap Songs (Billboard)	14
US Rhythmic Airplay (Billboard)	12

=== Year-end charts ===
Year-end chart performance for "Phenomenon"
Chart (1997)	Position
Canada Dance/Urban (RPM)	41
UK Singles (OCC)	198
UK Urban (Music Week)	31
US Rhythmic Top 40 (Billboard)	92
