= Voices of Theory (album) =

1997 studio album by Voices of Theory

Studio album by Voices of Theory
- Released: 1997
- Genre: R&B
- Length: 52:33
- Label: H.O.L.A./PolyGram
- Producer: John Benitez; Durrel Bottoms; Al McLean; D Moet; Malik Pendleton

Singles from Voices of Theory
- 1. "Somehow" Released: June 10, 1997; 2. "Say It" Released: February 24, 1998; 3. "Wherever You Go" Released: September 29, 1998

Professional ratings
Review scores
Source	Rating
AllMusic	1.5/5 stars

Voices of Theory is the only studio album by American contemporary R&B group Voices of Theory; released in 1997 via H.O.L.A. Recordings (which was distributed via PolyGram). The album did not chart on the Billboard 200, but it peaked at #56 on the Billboard R&B chart and #32 on the Billboard Heatseekers chart in 1998.

Three singles were released from Voices of Theory: "Somehow", "Say It" and "Wherever You Go". The latter two singles peaked at #10 and #36 on the Billboard Hot 100 in 1998, respectively.

== Track listing ==
No.	Title	Writer(s)	Producer(s)	Length
1.	"Get Down"	Mary Brown; Malik Pendleton	Malik Pendleton	4:00
2.	"Inside"	Steve Morales	Steve Morales	4:00
3.	"Somehow"	Ricardo Brown; Arlene DelValle; Joya Owens		4:55
4.	"Say It"	Raymond Basora; Steve Morales	Steve Morales	4:27
5.	"Wherever You Go"	Durrell Bottoms; Nicole Harris; Michael McCary	Durrell Bottoms; Michael McCary	5:37
6.	"If I Knew"	Durrell Bottoms; Tim Byrd; Michael McCary; Adrian Johnson Ross	Durrell Bottoms; Michael McCary	4:54
7.	"It's Been Awhile"		Durrell Bottoms; Michael McCary	4:11
8.	"I'll Give My Love to You"	Jamar Jones	Durrell Bottoms; Michael McCary	3:56
9.	"Can We Go Back"	Hector Ramos		3:56
10.	"How Can I Say Goodbye"	Roland Clark		3:32
11.	"Fly Away"	Hector Ramos; Stephen Walker		4:38
12.	"Dimelo (Say It)"	Raymond Basora; Luchito Cabarcas; Steve Morales		4:27
Total length:				52:33

== Chart positions ==
Chart (1998)	Peak position
US Heatseekers Albums (Billboard)	32
US R&B Albums (Billboard)	56
