= Auntie =

Auntie or aunty is an informal form of the word aunt. They may also refer to:

== Broadcasting ==
- Aunty, an informal name for the Australian Broadcasting Corporation
- Auntie, an informal name for the British Broadcasting Corporation
  - "Auntie" (song), a song released in 1972 to celebrate the BBC's 50th year

== Films ==
- Auntie, a 1914 film based on a novel by Temple Bailey
- Aunty (film), a 1995 Telugu language film

== Other uses ==
- Aunty, a term sometimes used to address an Australian Aboriginal elder
- The Aunties, a charity based in New Zealand

== See also ==
- Uncle (disambiguation)
