= Tamia (album) =

Studio album by Tamia
- Released: April 14, 1998
- Length: 60:57
- Labels: Qwest; Warner Bros.
- Producers: Keith Crouch; Jermaine Dupri; J-Dub; Quincy Jones; Jon-John Robinson; Samuel J. Sapp; Daryl Simmons; Tricky Stewart; Stevie J; Tim & Bob; Mario Winans

Tamia chronology
Tamia (1998)	A Nu Day (2000)

Singles from Tamia
- 1. "Imagination" Released: February 10, 1998; 2. "So into You" Released: June 23, 1998; 3. "Loving You Still" Released: March 2, 1999

Tamia is the debut studio album by Canadian recording artist Tamia. It was released on April 14, 1998, on Quincy Jones's Qwest Records, while distribution was handled through Warner Bros. Recorded after the release of her Grammy Award-nominated collaborations with Jones and the single "Missing You", her contribution to the soundtrack of the 1996 motion picture Set It Off, Tamia worked with a plethora of producers on her debut, including Jermaine Dupri, Tim & Bob, Mario Winans, J-Dub, Keith Crouch, and Christopher "Tricky" Stewart, many of which would become frequent producers on subsequent projects.

The album received generally favorable reviews, with critics praising Tamia's vocal abilities and its ballads and midtempo R&B tracks, while noting some inconsistency in the material. Commercially, it achieved moderate success, peaking at number 67 on the US Billboard 200, number 18 on the US Top R&B/Hip-Hop Albums and number 11 on the Canadian R&B Albums, while reaching number 25 in Japan and receiving a gold certification there. By 2003, Tamia had sold 416,000 copies in the United States and was later certified double platinum by the Recording Industry of South Africa (RISA).

Five singles were released from Tamia, with "Imagination" and "So into You" serving as the album's primary singles. The latter became its most successful, reaching number 30 on the US Billboard Hot 100 and number seven on the US Hot R&B/Hip-Hop Songs chart, and went on to become one of Tamia's signature songs. "Falling for You" and a cover of "Careless Whisper" were released in Japan, while "Loving You Still" peaked at number 78 on the Hot R&B/Hip-Hop Songs chart. The album earned Tamia two nominations at the 1999 Juno Awards, for Best New Solo Artist and R&B/Soul Recording of the Year.

== Background ==
After dominating local talent competitions through her teenage years, in 1994, Windsor native Tamia performed at a multiple sclerosis benefit in Aspen, Colorado, when she met music manager, Lionel Richie's ex-wife Brenda Richie, who was cosponsoring the event and introduced herself to Tamia after the show. A few months later, Tamia, who was being courted by Warner Bros. Records at the time, called Richie to say that she was coming to Los Angeles for a photo session, resulting in her lasting stay and a management deal with Richie. Weeks later, Richie arranged for her to perform at a star-studded party that she held for singer Luther Vandross. Her performance reportedly impressed all in attendance, including veteran producer Quincy Jones, who later offered her the chance to appear on his album Q's Jook Joint (1995).

Overwhelmed by his offer, Tamia recorded vocals for "You Put a Move on My Heart", which Jones later selected as the album's first single. A moderate commercial success, the collaboration earned acclaim from critics; it was later nominated for a Grammy Award along with their second collaboration "Slow Jams" and "Missing You", a song she recorded with Brandy, Gladys Knight, and Chaka Khan for the soundtrack of the 1996 motion picture Set It Off. All three track reached the top twenty on Billboard's Hot R&B Singles chart and gained Tamia additional recognition with nominations from the Soul Train Music Awards and the NAACP Image Awards. Following this, Jones signed her his label Qwest Records, a joint venture with Warner Bros., and enlisted the services of several producers to work on her debut self-titled album. Recording was reportedly intermitted when Tamia filmed the role of Sheri Silver in Speed 2: Cruise Control, playing the part of a featured vocalist at the dinner theatre aboard the luxury cruise ship.

== Promotion ==
Five singles were released from Tamia across different markets. Moving away from "You Put a Move on My Heart" with "Missing You," the adult contemporary-oriented collaborations that had introduced her, Qwest Records released "Imagination," produced by and featuring Jermaine Dupri, as the album's lead single. Built around a sample of "I Want You Back" by The Jackson 5, the song was among the final tracks recorded for the album. It reached number 12 in Canada, number 27 on the US Billboard Hot 100, and number 30 in New Zealand. Its music video, directed by Paul Hunter, directed by Paul Hunter, drew visual inspiration from French playwright Jean Cocteau's classic film version of Beauty and the Beast (1946).

Follow-up "So into You," co-written and produced by duo Tim & Bob and initially intended to be released by Brandy, became the album's most successful single. Built around a sample from the song "Say Yeah" by American soul band The Commodores, it reached number 30 on the Billboard Hot 100 and number seven on the Hot R&B/Hip-Hop Songs chart. Although its initial commercial success was moderate, the song gained renewed attention after being sampled on Fabolous' 2003 single "Into You" which also featured Tamia. The renewed exposure helped establish "So into You" as one of Tamia's signature songs. It was later certified silver by the British Phonographic Industry (BPI) for 200,000 units in October 2025.

In Japan, "Falling for You," produced by Stevie J, was released as the album's second single. The song, containing a sample of "Best of My Love" by the Emotions, failed to chart. "Loving You Still," a pop ballad incorporating contemporary R&B and soft Latin pop influences, was issued as the third and final single in North America. Written and produced by Daryl Simmons, it was significantly less successful than the album's preceding singles, peaking at number 78 on the Hot R&B/Hip-Hop Songs chart. A cover of George Michael's 1981 hit single "Careless Whisper," produced by Samuel J. Sapp, was subsequently released as another single in Japan. As with "Falling for You," it failed to chart though.

== Critical reception ==
Professional ratings
Review scores
Source	Rating
AllMusic	3/5 stars
Los Angeles Times	2.5/4 stars
USA Today	3/4 stars

Critics generally praised Tamia's vocal ability and the album's contemporary R&B direction, while noting inconsistencies in its material and a particular strength in its ballads and midtempo songs. Leo Stanley of AllMusic described Tamia as an "appealingly stylish collection of contemporary urban soul," praising Tamia's "seductive voice" while noting that the album suffered from "some uneven material." He singled out "Imagination" as an example of the album's stronger songs, writing that such moments demonstrated that Tamia had "true potential." Cherie Saunders from Vibe praised Tamia as a "deliberate attempt – and successful one – to free Tamia from the steely adult-contemporary cage." While impressed by the album's up-tempo material, Saunders concluded that Tamia's "strength clearly lies with ballads" and, despite "some inconsistency," praised her "shining vocal skills."

In his review for Billboard, Paul Verna wrote that Tamia "excels at ballad and midtempo tracks such as "So into You", "Falling for You", and "Rain on Me". He was less impressed with lead single "Imagination", which he criticized for Jermaine Dupri's unsuitable guest rap and a lack of "vocal punch." Connie Johnson of the Los Angeles Times praised Tamia's "stellar vocal talent" and glamorous image but felt that her debut album was held back by material that did not make full use of her abilities. She singled out Jermaine Dupri's "Imagination" and "Loving You Still" as promising, but identified "You Put a Move on My Heart" as the album's standout, calling it a "masterful custom-fit" for Tamia and praising her precise vocal delivery, while expressing disappointment that the album contained few similarly strong performances. Tamia garnered the singer two Juno Award nominations for Best New Solo Artist and R&B/Soul Recording of the Year at the 1999 award ceremony.

== Commercial performance ==
Commercially, Tamia achieved moderate success in several international markets, with its strongest performance in the United States. The album debuted and peaked at number 67 on US Billboard 200, where it spent 24 weeks, and reached number 18 on the Top R&B/Hip-Hop Albums chart, ranking at number 62 on the chart's 1998 year-end list. In Canada, it reached number 62 on the RPM Top Albums/CDs chart and performed better on the Canadian R&B Albums chart, where it peaked at number 11 and ranked number 66 for 1998.

Elsewhere, Tamia reached number 25 on Japan's Oricon Albums Chart and was certified gold by the Recording Industry Association of Japan (RIAJ) in June 1998 for shipments of 100,000 copies. By October 2003, the album had sold 416,000 copies in the United States. A steady seller, Tamia was particularly successful in South Africa, where it was certified double platinum by the Recording Industry of South Africa (RISA) in May 2026, nearly three decades after its release, reflecting 100,000 certified sales and streaming-equivalent units.

== Track listing ==
Tamia track listing
No.	Title	Writer(s)	Producer(s)	Length
1.	"Imagination" (featuring Jermaine Dupri)	Dupri; Manuel Seal; Berry Gordy; Alphonzo Mizell; Freddie Perren; Deke Richards	Dupri; Seal^{[a]}	3:33
2.	"So Into You"	Tim Kelley; Bob Robinson; Tamia; Lionel Richie; Ronald LaPread	Tim & Bob	4:21
3.	"Never Gonna Let You Go"	Mario Winans; Arthur Hoyle; Kenny Hickson	Winans	4:01
4.	"Falling for You"	Tamia; Gordon Chambers; Terrell Carter; William Turpin; Steven Jordan; Maurice White; Al McKay	Stevie J.	5:11
5.	"Show Me Love"	J-Dub; Paige Lackey	J-Dub	4:06
6.	"Rain on Me"	Winans; Tamia; Hickson	Winans	4:22
7.	"Is That You?" (featuring Jermaine Dupri)	Dupri; Seal	Dupri; Seal^{[a]}	3:22
8.	"Who Do You Tell?"	Marc Nelson; Sherree Ford-Payne; Fred Z; Mark Coleman	Daryl Simmons	4:20
9.	"Gotta Move On"	Keith Crouch; John "Jubu" Smith; Tamia	Crouch	5:08
10.	"This Time It's Love"	Christopher Stewart; Sean Hall; Tamia	Chris "Tricky" Stewart	5:52
11.	"Loving You Still"	Simmons	Simmons	5:09
12.	"Careless Whisper"	George Michael; Andrew Ridgeley	Samuel J. Sapp; Tim Shider^{[a]}	5:12
13.	"You Put a Move on My Heart"	Rod Temperton	Quincy Jones	6:12
Total length:				60:57

Bonus track
No.	Title	Writer(s)	Producer(s)	Length
14.	"So Young"	Alex Rowe	Jon-John Robinson

Notes and sample credits

- ^{^[a]} denotes co-producer
- "Imagination" contains an interpolation from "I Want You Back", written by Berry Gordy, Alphonso Mizell, Freddie Perren and Deke Richards.
- "So Into You" contains a sample of "Say Yeah" performed by The Commodores, written by Lionel Richie and Ronald LaPread.
- "Falling For You" contains a sample of "Best of My Love" performed by The Emotions, written by Maurice White and Al McKay.
- "Careless Whisper" is a cover of George Michael's "Careless Whisper".
- "You Put a Move on My Heart" is a cover of Mica Paris's "You Put a Move on My Heart".

== Personnel ==
Musicians

- Tamia – lead vocals, background vocals (1-10, 12)
- Alex Al – bass guitar (10)
- Gerald Albright – saxophone solo (12)
- George Bohanon – trombone (13)
- Oscar Brashear – trumpet (13)
- Liza Broome – background vocals (11)
- Alex Brown – background vocals (13)
- Ray Brown – trumpet (13)
- Bridgette Bryant – background vocals (13)
- Terrell Carter – additional background vocals (4)
- Gordon Chambers – vocal arrangements and additional background vocals (4)
- Pete Christlieb – saxophone (13)
- Jeff Clayton – saxophone (13)
- John Clayton – arranger and conductor (13)
- Pamela Cork – background vocals (11)
- Keith Crouch – arranger, instruments, and vocal arrangements (9)
- Chelle Davis – background vocals (11)
- Jermaine Dupri – rap (1), background vocals (7)
- Ronnie Garrett – bass guitar (11)
- Siedah Garrett – background vocals (13)
- Gary Grant – trumpet (13)
- Erik Hanson – drum programming and synth programming (13)
- Jerry Hey – trumpet (13)
- Stevie J – vocal arrangements (4)
- Fred Jackson Jr. – saxophone (13)
- Paul Jackson Jr. – guitar (13)
- Charles Loper – trombone (13)
- Steven Meeder – drums (8, 11)
- Marc Nelson – background vocals and background vocal arrangements (8)
- Jack Nimitz – saxophone (13)
- Greg Phillinganes – keyboards (6, 13)
- QDIII – drum programming (13)
- Bill Reichenbach – trombone (13)
- Bob Robinson – acoustic piano (6)
- John Robinson – drums (13)
- Tom Scott – saxophone (13)
- Manuel Seal – background vocals (1)
- Daryl Simmons – keyboards and drum programming (8, 11), acoustic piano and percussion (8)
- John "Jubu" Smith – guitar (9)
- Tanya "Tann" Smith – background vocals (11)
- Ralph Stacy – bass guitar (8)
- Chris "Tricky" Stewart – keyboards, programming, and sequencing (10)
- Neil Stubenhaus – bass guitar (13)
- Rod Temperton – arranger and keyboards (13)
- Michael Thompson – guitar (8, 11)
- Mario Winans – background vocals (2, 3, 6), instruments (6)
- Reggie Young – trombone (13)
- Snooky Young – trumpet (13)

Technical personnel

- Tamia – executive producer
- Ian Alexander – co-executive producer
- Paul D. Allen – engineer (3, 5, 6), mixing (5, 6)
- Constance Armstrong – production coordinator (6)
- Chris Brooks – assistant mix engineer (3)
- Bob Brown – engineer and mixing (4)
- Jay Brown – associate executive producer
- Joe Brown – assistant mix engineer (9)
- Tom Brown – engineer (12)
- Francis Buckley – engineer (13)
- Rob Chiarelli – mixing (12)
- Keith Crouch – engineer (9)
- Jermaine Dupri – mixing (7)
- Jon Gass – mixing (8, 11)
- Humberto Gatica – mixing (3, 10)
- Stephanie Gylden – engineer (2), assistant engineer (6, 13)
- Mauricio Iragorri – engineer (10)
- Stevie J – mixing (4)
- Booker T. Jones III – mixing (9)
- Quincy Jones – executive producer
- Thom "TK" Kidd – engineer (8, 11)
- Kevin Lively – assistant engineer (3, 8, 11)
- Nick Marshall – assistant engineer (4)
- Mark D. Persaud – associate executive producer
- Herb Powers – mastering
- Brenda Richie – executive producer
- Ivy Skoff – production coordinator (8, 11)
- Chris "Tricky" Stewart – engineer (10)
- Bruce Swedien – mixing (13)
- Phil Tan – engineer and mixing (1, 7)
- Dave Way – mixing (2)

== Charts ==
=== Weekly charts ===
Weekly chart performance for Tamia
Chart (1998)	Peak position
Canada Top Albums/CDs (RPM)	62
Canadian R&B Albums (SoundScan)	11
Japanese Albums (Oricon)	25
US Billboard 200	67
US Top R&B/Hip-Hop Albums (Billboard)	18

=== Year-end charts ===
Year-end chart performance for Tamia
Chart (1998)	Position
Canadian R&B Albums (SoundScan)	66
US Top R&B/Hip-Hop Albums (Billboard)	62

== Certifications ==
Certifications for Tamia
Region	Certification	Certified units/sales
Japan (RIAJ)	Gold	100,000^{^}
South Africa (RISA)	2× Platinum	100,000^{‡}
^{^} Shipments figures based on certification alone.^{‡} Sales+streaming figures based on certification alone.
