= Phenomenon (LL Cool J album) =

Studio album by LL Cool J
- Released: October 14, 1997
- Recorded: 1996–1997
- Genre: Hip hop
- Length: 43:58
- Labels: Def Jam; PolyGram
- Producers: The Hitmen (Including Deric "D-Dot" Angelettie, Steven "Stevie J" Jordan, & Ron Lawrence); Trackmasters; Daven "Prestige" Vanderpool; L.E.S.; Curt Gowdy; Erick Sermon

LL Cool J chronology
All World: Greatest Hits (1996)	Phenomenon (1997)	G.O.A.T. (2000)

Singles from Phenomenon
- 1. "Phenomenon" Released: September 23, 1997; 2. "4, 3, 2, 1" Released: December 9, 1997; 3. "Father" Released: January 13, 1998; 4. "Hot, Hot, Hot" Released: March 27, 1998; 5. "Candy" Released: July 3, 1998

Phenomenon is the seventh studio album by rapper LL Cool J, released on October 14, 1997, through Def Jam Recordings. After the success of his previous release Mr. Smith (1995), the same basic principles are followed here, with several R&B-influenced tracks, and a couple of more hardcore rap tracks. The album is executively produced by Sean "Puffy" Combs and therefore features production from his in-house roster of producers the Hitmen, alongside the Trackmasters, Daven "Prestige" Vanderpool, L.E.S. and Erick Sermon. The album received mixed reviews from critics. Phenomenon debuted and peaked at number seven on the Billboard 200, with first week sales of 102,000, and was certified Platinum, unlike Mr. Smith, which was certified 2× Platinum. It spawned five singles: the title track, "4, 3, 2, 1", "Father", "Hot, Hot, Hot" and "Candy".

== Critical reception ==
Professional ratings
Review scores
Source	Rating
AllMusic	3/5 stars
The Encyclopedia of Popular Music	4/5 stars
Entertainment Weekly	B+
Los Angeles Times	3/4 stars
Rolling Stone	3/5 stars
The Source	3.5/5 stars

Cheo Hodari Coker, writing for the Los Angeles Times, called it "LL's best record" since Mama Said Knock You Out, praising "Father" for showing him on "rap's cutting edge" and being more personal. Jim Farber of Entertainment Weekly wrote that: "Musically, the album takes far fewer risks than his innovative early work. With its happy beats, easy funk bass, and eager R&B melodies, Phenomenon best recalls the early rap LL grew up on. Think Sugar Hill for the '90s, but with a wholly new kind of role for LL: the rapper who never had a real father here aims to father us all." Natasha Stovall of Rolling Stone praised LL for delivering quality loverman ballads and battle rap tracks while also being an insightful storyteller on "Father", but critiqued that the album's "competent grooves" don't match with his words. AllMusic's Stephen Thomas Erlewine called it "a retread of Mr. Smith," highlighting "a couple of killer singles, a few dogs, and a lot of filler", concluding that: "Still, Phenomenon sounds good when it's playing, and even if it doesn't leave a lasting impression, it's a solid, professional effort that illustrates why LL is still in the game, 12 years after his first record."

== Track listing ==
Phenomenon track listing
#	Title	Length	Featured Artists	Producer(s)	Sample(s)
1	"Phenomenon"	4:04		Sean "Puffy" Combs for The Hitmen, Ron "AMEN-RA" Lawrence	"Who Is He and What Is He to You?" by Creative Source; "White Lines (Don't Don't Do It)" by Grandmaster Melle Mel
2	"Candy"	4:32	Ricky Bell & Ralph Tresvant	Trackmasters	"Sunshine" by Alexander O'Neal; "Candy Girl" by New Edition
3	"Starsky & Hutch"	4:03	Busta Rhymes	L.E.S.	"Dance With Me" by Peter Brown
4	"Another Dollar"	3:48		Curt Gowdy, Trackmasters	"Stealing" by Dr. John
5	"Nobody Can Freak You"	3:20	LeShaun & Keith Sweat	Trackmasters	"Nobody Can Be You" by Steve Arrington
6	"Hot, Hot, Hot"	4:22		Sean "Puffy" Combs, Deric "D-Dot" Angelettie & Ron Lawrence for The Hitmen	"Pleasure of Love" by Tom Tom Club
7	"4, 3, 2, 1"	4:16	Canibus, DMX & Method Man & Redman	Erick Sermon	"Superrappin'" by Grandmaster Flash and The Furious Five
8	"Wanna Get Paid"	4:11	The Lost Boyz	Daven "Prestige" Vanderpool	"Action" by Orange Krush
9	"Father"	4:44		Trackmasters	"Father Figure" by George Michael
10	"Don't Be Late, Don't Come Too Soon"	6:38	Tamia	Steven "Stevie J" Jordan for The Hitmen	"You Are My Starship" by Norman Connors

== Charts ==
Chart performance for Phenomenon
Chart (1997)	Peak position
Australian Albums (ARIA)	88
Canadian Albums (Billboard)	7
Dutch Albums (Album Top 100)	48
German Albums (Offizielle Top 100)	24
New Zealand Albums (RMNZ)	39
Swedish Albums (Sverigetopplistan)	57
Swiss Albums (Schweizer Hitparade)	48
UK Albums (Official Charts)	37
UK R&B Albums (Official Charts)	6
US Billboard 200	7
US Top R&B/Hip-Hop Albums (Billboard)	4

== Certifications ==
Region	Certification	Certified units/sales
Canada (Music Canada)	Platinum	100,000^{^}
United States (RIAA)	Platinum	1,000,000^{^}
^{^} Shipments figures based on certification alone.
