= Loving You Still =

Single by Tamia

from the album Tamia
- Released: 1999
- Genre: R&B
- Length: 5:09
- Label: Qwest; Warner Bros.
- Songwriter: Daryl Simmons
- Producer: Daryl Simmons

Tamia singles chronology
"So into You" (1998)	"Loving You Still" (1999)	"Spend My Life with You" (1999)

"Loving You Still" is a song by Canadian recording artist Tamia, recorded for her self-titled studio album (1998). Written and produced by Daryl Simmons, "Loving You Still" is pop ballad with contemporary R&B and soft latin pop influences featuring an instrumentation consisting essentially of flamenco guitars and castanets. Lyrically, the track finds the female protagonist still pines for her former love interest. The song was released as third single from Tamia in the United States, where it reached number 78 on the US Billboard Hot R&B Singles & Tracks chart.

== Track listings ==
CD single
No.	Title	Length
1.	"Loving You Still" (Radio Edit)	3:59
2.	"Loving You Still" (Instrumental)	5:11

== Credits and personnel ==
Credits adapted from the liner notes of Tamia.

- Backing Vocals – Chelle Davis, Liza Broome, Pamela Cork, Tanya "Tann" Smith
- Bass – Ronnie Garret
- Drums – Ronnie Garret
- Guitar – Michael Thompson
- Lead vocals – Tamia
- Mixing – John Gass
- Production, keyboards, writing – Daryl Simmons
- Production Coordinator – Steven Meeder
- Recording – Thom "TK" Kidd
- Recording assistance – Kevin Lively

== Charts ==
=== Weekly charts ===
Chart (1999)	Peak position
US Hot R&B/Hip-Hop Songs (Billboard)	78
