= Harlem World =

Studio album by Mase
- Released: October 28, 1997
- Studio: Daddy's House Recording Studio (New York)
- Genre: East Coast hip-hop
- Length: 66:04
- Label: Bad Boy; Arista
- Producer: Carlos Broady; Sean "Puffy" Combs; D-Dot; Jermaine Dupri; Dame Grease; The Hitmen; Stevie J.; J-Dub; Ron "Amen-Ra" Lawrence; Mo-Suave-A; Nashiem Myrick; The Neptunes; Chucky Thompson; Younglord

Mase chronology
| Harlem World (1997) | Double Up (1999) |

Singles from Harlem World
- 1. "Feel So Good" Released: October 14, 1997; 2. "What You Want" Released: December 3, 1997; 3. "Lookin' at Me" Released: July 7, 1998; 4. "24 Hrs. to Live" Released: February 20, 1998

Harlem World is the debut studio album by American rapper Mase. It was released on October 28, 1997, by Bad Boy Records and Arista Records. Overseen by Bad Boy head Sean "Puffy" Combs, the album was produced by a variety of musicians, including Jermaine Dupri, Dame Grease, The Neptunes, and Younglord, along with Bad Boy's roster of frequent collaborators or inhouse producers such as D-Dot, The Hitmen, Stevie J., J-Dub, Ron "Amen-Ra" Lawrence, and Chucky Thompson.

The album was released to favorable reviews and commercial success. It was nominated for Best Rap Album at the 41st Annual Grammy Awards and debuted at number one on both the Canadian Albums Chart and the US Billboard 200. It sold 3.3 million copies domestically and has been certified quadruple platinum in the United States. With "Feel So Good", "What You Want" and "Lookin' at Me", Harlem World produced three consecutive top ten hits on the US Billboard Hot 100.

== Background ==
After returning to Harlem, Mase and his childhood friend Cam'ron began rapping under the names Murda Mase and Killa Cam, forming the group Children of the Corn with local artists including Big L and Bloodshed. Managed briefly by Damon Dash, Mase was later introduced to Cudda Love, who took him to Atlanta, where he met Puff Daddy. After impressing him at a rap convention, Mase signed a $250,000 deal with Bad Boy Records. His stage name was shortened to Mase and he quickly gained exposure through features on 112's "Only You," Daddy’s "Can't Nobody Hold Me Down" and "Been Around the World", and Notorious B.I.G.'s chart-topping "Mo Money Mo Problems." For Mase's debut album with Bad Boy, Puff Daddy enlisted producers including D-Dot, The Hitmen, Jermaine Dupri, The Neptunes, Dame Grease, and Mo-Suave-A.

== Critical reception ==
Professional ratings
Review scores
| Source | Rating |
|---|---|
| AllMusic | 4/5 stars |
| Robert Christgau | A− |
| Entertainment Weekly | B+ |
| Los Angeles Times | 3.5/4 stars |
| Pitchfork | 8.1/10 |
| RapReviews | 7/10 |
| The Rolling Stone Album Guide | 3/5 stars |
| Uncut | 4/5 stars |

Matt Diehl from Entertainment Weekly said of the album: "Known for his funkified cameos on hits by Mariah Carey, Notorious B.I.G., and mentor Puff Daddy, rap’s newest bad boy Mase more than holds his own on his solo debut Harlem World. Like Puff Daddy, he laces hardcore raps with pop hooks and drops Big Willie boasts on cuts like 'Do You Wanna Get $'; his distinctive marble-mouthed drawl, however, creates a regular-guy persona all too rare in hip-hop." AllMusic editor Leo Stanley wrote, "like many big-budget hip-hop records, Harlem World is nearly a various-artists collection, featuring an array of different producers and guest rappers that often obscure Mase himself. Still, all that talent guarantees that the record will be well crafted, and that certainly is true. With Combs and Dupri behind the decks for much of the album, Harlem World has a dense, funky sound that is up-tempo party rap at its best."

Los Angeles Times critic Cheo Hodari Coker wrote that on Harlem World "Mase is consistently mellow and confident, relying on simplicity but also displaying moments of stunning insight and poignancy [...] With Harlem World, which features production from a host of hot studio hands, Mase manages to display commercial sensibilities without selling out, and he’s also able to poke fun at his own image when the time is right. For Mase, mo money seems like no problem." Sheldon Pearce of Pitchfork called the album "larger than life. Mase had a buttery touch when in his groove, as if having an out-of-body experience watching himself churn out hits. His flows were as silky, or as plush, or as golden as the material world furnishing his songs. He made the realm of luxury feel quaint." Robert Christgau called Harlem World a "hugely appealing, moderately disturbing piece of pop."

== Commercial performance ==
Harlem World debuted at number one on the US Billboard 200 and the Top R&B/Hip-Hop Albums chart in the week of November 15, 1997, selling nearly 273,000 copies in its first week. It was certified both Gold and Platinum by the Recording Industry Association of America (RIAA) on December 2, 1997. It reached 2× Platinum status two weeks later, 3× Platinum status in July 1999, and 4× Platinum status in October 1999. With 3.3 million units sold, the album remains Mase’s biggest-selling to date.

== Track listing ==
Harlem World track listing
| No. | Title | Writer(s) | Producer(s) | Length |
|---|---|---|---|---|
| 1. | "Puff's Intro" | | Sean "Puffy" Combs | 1:40 |
| 2. | "Do You Wanna Get $?" (featuring Puff Daddy) | Mason Betha; Deric Angelettie; Ron Lawrence; Sean Combs; Peter Brown; Robert Rans | Deric "D-Dot" Angelettie; Ron "Amen-Ra" Lawrence | 3:49 |
| 3. | "Take What's Yours" (featuring DMX) | Betha; Earl Simmons; Nashiem Myrick; Carlos Broady; Combs | Nashiem Myrick; Carlos "Six July" Broady; Combs | 3:45 |
| 4. | "Mad Rapper (Interlude)" | | Combs; Angelettie; Mase | 1:13 |
| 5. | "Will They Die 4 U?" (featuring Puff Daddy and Lil' Kim) | Betha; Lawrence; Combs; Kimberly Jones; Sam Taylor | Combs; Lawrence | 4:04 |
| 6. | "Lookin' at Me" (featuring Puff Daddy) | Betha; Chad Hugo; Pharrell Williams; Combs | The Neptunes | 4:15 |
| 7. | "White Girl (Interlude)" | | Combs; Angelettie; Mase | 0:52 |
| 8. | "Love U So" (featuring Billy Lawrence) | Betha; Steven Jordan; Combs; Allen McGrier; Teena Marie Brockett; Norman Whitfield | Stevie J. | 3:12 |
| 9. | "The Player Way" (featuring Eightball & MJG) | Betha; Triston Jones; Premro Smith; Marlon Goodwin; Combs | Mo-Suave-A Productions | 4:13 |
| 10. | "Hater (Interlude)" | | Combs; Angelettie; Mase | 1:00 |
| 11. | "Niggaz Wanna Act" (featuring Busta Rhymes) | Betha; Damon Blackman; Richard Frierson; Simmons; Combs; Hubert Yarborough | Grease; Richard "Younglord" Frierson | 4:09 |
| 12. | "Feel So Good" (featuring Kelly Price) | Robert Earl Bell; Ronald Bell; George Brown; Robert Mickens; Claydes Smith; Dennis Thomas; Richard Westfield; Lawrence Dermer; Joe Galdo; Rafael Vigil | Combs; Angelettie | 3:24 |
| 13. | "What You Want" (featuring Total) | Betha; Keisha Spivey; Curtis Mayfield; Myrick; Combs | Combs; Myrick | 4:02 |
| 14. | "Phone Conversation (Interlude)" | | Combs; Angelettie; Mase | 1:49 |
| 15. | "Cheat on You" (featuring Lil' Cease and Jay-Z) | Betha; James Lloyd; Jermaine Dupri; Shawn Carter; Combs; Michael Jackson | Jermaine Dupri | 3:15 |
| 16. | "24 Hrs. to Live" (featuring The LOX, Black Rob, and DMX) | Betha; Sean Jacobs; Jason Phillips; David Styles; Robert Ross; Simmons; Angelettie; Myrick; Broady; Combs | Angelettie; Myrick; Broady | 4:16 |
| 17. | "I Need to Be" (featuring Monifah) | Betha; Angelettie; Carl Thompson; Combs; Siedah Garrett; George Johnson; Louis Johnson | Angelettie; Carl "Chucky" Thompson | 5:12 |
| 18. | "Watch Your Back (Interlude)" | | Combs; Angelettie; Mase | 0:56 |
| 19. | "Wanna Hurt Mase?" | Betha; Lawrence; Combs; Jon Moss; Roy Hay; Mikey Craig; George O'Dowd | Combs; Lawrence | 4:23 |
| 20. | "Jealous Guy" (featuring 112) | Michael Johnson; Larry Johnson | Combs; J-Dub | 6:25 |
| Total length: | | | | 66:04 |

Sample credits

- "Puff's Intro" contains excerpts from "Joy", written and performed by Isaac Hayes.
- "Do You Wanna Get $" contains excerpts from "Do Ya Wanna Get Funky with Me", performed by Peter Brown.
- "Will They Die 4 U?" contains a sample from "Everything Good to You (Ain't Always Good for You)", performed by B. T. Express.
- "Love U So" contains excerpts from "Ooh Boy", written by Norman Whitfield, and a sample of "Square Biz", performed by Teena Marie.
- "Niggaz Wanna Act" contains elements from "Hostage", performed by Harold Melvin & the Blue Notes.
- "Feel So Good" contains a sample from "Hollywood Swinging", performed by Kool & The Gang, and embodies portions of "Bad Boy", performed by Miami Sound Machine.
- "What You Want" contains a sample from "Right on for the Darkness", written and recorded by Curtis Mayfield.
- "Cheat on You" contains a sample from "Don't Stop 'Til You Get Enough", performed by Michael Jackson.
- "24 Hrs. to Live" contains excerpts from "Moses Theme", written by LeRoy Bell, Thom Bell, Jack Robinson, and Casey James. It also contains samples from "Magic Wanda", performed by Frankie Bleu.
- "I Need to Be" contains a sample from "Tomorrow (A Better You, Better Me)", performed by The Brothers Johnson.
- "Wanna Hurt Mase?" embodies portions of "Do You Really Want to Hurt Me", written by Jon Moss, Roy Hay, Mikey Craig, and George O'Dowd.
- "Jealous Guy" contains a sample from "Jealous Girl", written and performed by New Edition.

== Personnel ==
- Prince Charles Alexander – mixing (5)
- Deric "D-Dot" Angelettie – mixing (16), associate executive producer
- Dave Aron – mixing (1)
- Carlos "Six July" Broady – piano (3)
- Sean "Puffy" Combs – mixing (5, 6, 9), executive producer
- Lane Craven – mixing (2, 8, 20)
- Mike Daddy – grooming
- Stephen Dent – engineer (2, 5, 6, 8, 9, 11, 13, 16, 17, 19)
- Jermaine Dupri – mixing (15)
- Ben Garrison – engineer (20)
- DJ IROC – scratches (5, 13)
- J-Dub – additional programming (12, 16)
- Groovy Lew – stylist
- Tony Maserati – mixing (6, 9)
- Michael Patterson – engineer (2), mixing (3, 11, 12, 17, 19)
- Lisa Peardon – photography
- Herb Powers – mastering
- Kelly Price – additional vocals (12)
- Phil Tan – engineer and mixing (15)
- Rich Travail – mixing (13)
- Barry White – grooming
- Doug Wilson – engineer (1, 3, 11, 12, 17)
- Jimmy Wilson – engineer (9)

== Charts ==
=== Weekly charts ===
Weekly chart performance for Harlem World
| Chart (1997–1998) | Peak position |
|---|---|
| Australian Albums (ARIA) | 91 |
| Canadian Albums (Billboard) | 1 |
| Canadian R&B Albums (SoundScan) | 1 |
| Dutch Albums (Album Top 100) | 59 |
| New Zealand Albums (RMNZ) | 20 |
| UK Albums (OCC) | 53 |
| UK R&B Albums (OCC) | 8 |
| US Billboard 200 | 1 |
| US Top R&B/Hip-Hop Albums (Billboard) | 1 |

=== Year-end charts ===
Year-end chart performance for Harlem World
| Chart (1997) | Position |
|---|---|
| Canadian Albums (SoundScan) | 30 |
| Canadian R&B Albums (SoundScan) | 4 |

| Chart (1998) | Position |
|---|---|
| Canadian Albums (RPM) | 44 |
| Canadian Albums (SoundScan) | 60 |
| Canadian R&B Albums (SoundScan) | 7 |
| US Billboard 200 | 20 |
| US Top R&B/Hip-Hop Albums (Billboard) | 13 |

== Certifications ==
Certifications for Harlem World
| Region | Certification | Certified units/sales |
|---|---|---|
| Canada (Music Canada) | 3× Platinum | 300,000^{^} |
| New Zealand (RMNZ) | Gold | 7,500^{‡} |
| United States (RIAA) | 4× Platinum | 4,000,000^{^} |
^{^} Shipments figures based on certification alone.^{‡} Sales+streaming figures based on certification alone.

== See also ==
- List of number-one albums of 1997 (U.S.)
- List of number-one R&B albums of 1997 (U.S.)
