= So Into You (Tamia song) =

Single by Tamia

from the album Tamia
- Released: June 23, 1998
- Genre: R&B
- Length: 4:22
- Label: Qwest; Warner Bros.
- Songwriters: Tim Kelley; Bob Robinson; Tamia Washington; Lionel Richie; Ronald LaPread
- Producer: Tim & Bob

Tamia singles chronology
"Imagination" (1998)	"So Into You" (1998)	"Loving You Still" (1999)

Music video
- "So Into You" on YouTube

"So Into You" is a song performed by Canadian singer Tamia from her self-titled debut album Tamia (1998). It was written by Tamia, Tim Kelley, and Bob Robinson, with production helmed by Kelley and Robinson under their production moniker Tim & Bob. The song is built around a sample from "Say Yeah" (1978) by American soul band the Commodores. Due to the inclusion of the sample, its writers Lionel Richie and Ronald LaPread are credited as songwriters. "So Into You" is a mid-tempo R&B song with lyrics describing the protagonist's feelings of love for her partner.

The song earned generally positive reviews from critics and was noted for Tamia's more restrained and seductive singing technique. It was released as the third single from the album on June 23, 1998 and became an R&B hit, peaking at number seven on the US Billboard Hot R&B/Hip-Hop Songs. The song's music video was created by Harvey White and premiered on American TV in June 1998. It received a Directorial Debut of the Year nomination at the MVPA Awards. Since its release, "So Into You" has often been performed on Tamia's concerts and tours, including The Verizon Ladies First Tour in 2004 and the Single Ladies Tour in 2012.

== Background and release ==
In the early 1990s, Canadian singer Tamia was offered a record contract with Quincy Jones' Qwest Records and shortly thereafter started work on her debut album. While recording the album, several singles with Tamia as a featured performer were released, all gaining attention. Her debut single "You Put a Move on My Heart", "Slow Jams" (performed with Babyface, Portrait and Barry White) and "Missing You" (performed with Brandy, Chaka Khan and Gladys Knight) all earned Grammy Award nominations, making Tamia one of the most anticipated new R&B singers in the US.

The publicity increased the expectations on Tamia's self-titled debut album Tamia which was released in April 1998. The album's release was preceded by its lead single "Imagination", which peaked at number 12 on the Hot R&B/Hip-Hop Songs chart, and "Falling for You" which was released as the album's second single in Japan only. "So Into You" was released as the album's third single on June 23, 1998. Fellow R&B singer Brandy originally recorded a demo version of "So Into You", with Mario Winans providing background vocals. R&B girl group Destiny's Child also recorded a demo of the same song but different title and lyrics called “In My Life.”

== Music video ==
A music video for "So Into You" was directed by Harvey White and filmed from May 16–19, 1998. The concept of the video was based on Tamia and Grant Hill (her future husband) having to be in a sort of long distance relationship at the beginning due to his travel. The video starts with Tamia lying on a couch. Then, people are seen walking down a hallway (later revealed to be her friends), and enter Tamia's room. Then, it reveals that she and her friends were having a party. Several scenes later change to Tamia in several different rooms, singing the song. The video ends with Tamia's friends leaving, Tamia lying down on her bed, and then her standing in the center of a room. Nicole Richie, Lionel Richie's daughter, plays one of Tamia's friends in this music video.

== Covers and samples ==
- In 2003, American rapper Fabolous sampled the song in his "Into You" (2003), with Tamia performing its hook.
- In 2015, Childish Gambino covered the song for Australian radio station Triple J's weekly segment Like a Version.
- In 2016, Australian EDM duo Odd Mob along with vocalist Starley covered the song. The cover spent seven weeks at number one on the ARIA Club Tracks chart.
- In 2016, Candace Boyd and rapper French Montana released the song "Damn Good Time", which sampled this song.
- In 2017, Australian musician Nai Palm covered the song on her debut album Needle Paw.
- In 2018, Burna Boy's song "Giddem", which appeared on Outside, contains an interploation of "Into You".
- In 2019, Chika covered the song as a reimagining with a female vocalist and a female love interest. It featured Charlie Wilson on background vocals.
- In 2020, Pop Smoke sampled and reimagined the song in his song "Something Special".
- In 2025, Tiwa Savage sampled the song on "You 4 Me", the lead single from her fourth studio album This One Is Personal.

== Track listing ==
CD single
No.	Title	Length
1.	"So Into You" (album version)	3:55
2.	"So Into You" (radio edit)	3:37
3.	"So Into You" (instrumental)	3:54
4.	"So Into You" (a cappella)	3:55

== Credits and personnel ==
Credits adapted from the liner notes of Tamia.

- Lead Vocals, backing vocals, writing – Tamia
- Backing Vocals – Mario Winans
- Mixing – Dave Wayy
- Production, writing – Bob Robinson, Tim Kelley
- Recording – Stephanie Gylden
- Writing [sample] – Lionel Richie, Ronald LaPread

== Charts ==
=== Weekly charts ===
Chart (1998)	Peak position
US Billboard Hot 100	30
US Hot R&B/Hip-Hop Songs (Billboard)	7
US Rhythmic Airplay (Billboard)	22

=== Year-end charts ===
Chart (1998)	Position
US Hot R&B/Hip-Hop Songs (Billboard)	32

== Certifications ==
Certifications for "So Into You"
Region	Certification	Certified units/sales
United Kingdom (BPI)	Silver	200,000^{‡}
^{‡} Sales+streaming figures based on certification alone.
