= Say Uncle (disambiguation) =

"Say Uncle", "Cry Uncle" and "Uncle!" are idiomatic expressions of speech, used to demand submission from one's opponent. They may also refer to:

== Television and film ==
- Say Uncle (film), a 2005 film directed by Peter Paige
- "Say Uncle" (Steven Universe), a crossover episode of Steven Universe and Uncle Grandpa
- "Say Uncle", an episode of CSI: Crime Scene Investigation
- "Say Uncle", an episode of Family Ties
- "Say Uncle", a 1966 episode of Please Don't Eat the Daisies
- Cry Uncle!, a 1971 film directed by John G. Avildsen
- "Cry Uncle", an episode of The Fugitive
- "Cry Uncle", an episode of The Mod Squad
- "Cry Uncle", an episode of The Real Ghostbusters
- "Cry Uncle", an episode of Tom and Jerry Tales
- "The Say U.N.C.L.E. Affair", an episode of The A-Team

== Other ==
- Say Uncle, a 1988 album by Uncle Slam
- Say Uncle, a 2005 poetry collection by Kay Ryan
- Cry Uncle, a 1995 novel by Judith Arnold
