= Aunt Flo =

Aunt Flo is a popular euphemism referring to menstruation. It may also refer to:

== Characters ==
- A character in the British television series ...And Mother Makes Three
- A character in the children's television series Bod
- A character in the 1984 short story "Gramma" by Stephen King
- A character in the television series The Mary Tyler Moore Show
- A character in the 2007 book Pontoon: A Novel of Lake Wobegon by Garrison Keillor
- A character in the animated series South Park
- A character in the American sketch comedy television series Wonder Showzen
