= Uncle Sam (album) =

1997 studio album by Uncle Sam

Studio album by Uncle Sam
- Released: October 14, 1997
- Genre: R&B
- Length: 54:48
- Labels: Stonecreek; Epic
- Producers: Charlucci Finney; Michael McCary; Nathan Morris; Wanya Morris; Shawn Stockman

Singles from Uncle Sam
- 1. "I Don't Ever Want to See You Again" Released: September 23, 1997

Professional ratings
Review scores
Source	Rating
AllMusic	4/5 stars

Uncle Sam is the only studio album from American contemporary R&B singer Uncle Sam. It includes the hit single "I Don't Ever Want to See You Again" and the cover "Tender Love". On the worldwide release, a few bonus tracks were included. It remains Sam's sole studio album.

== Track listing ==
#	Title	Composer(s)	Time
1	"Can You Feel It" (feat. Popa Chief)	MAS-PD; Wanya Morris; Popa Chief; Shawn Stockman	4:23
2	"You Make Me Feel Like"	S. Clark; MAS-PD; Wanya Morris; Shawn Stockman	6:05
3	"Throw Your Hands in the Air"	MAS-PD; Wanya Morris; Uncle Sam	3:48
4	"Leave Well Enough Alone"	Shawn Stockman	5:43
5	"Without Lovin' You"	Shawn Stockman	4:56
6	"Someone Like You"	Shawn Stockman	4:59
7	"Tender Love"	Jimmy Jam and Terry Lewis	3:35
8	"Think About Me" (feat. Boyz II Men)	K. Crouch; K. Jones; R. Patterson; Ken Paul; Popa Chief; Shawn Stockman; Milton Thornton	4:03
9	"Baby You Are"	Dennis Ross III	4:13
10	"Stop Foolin' Around"	Shawn Stockman	4:48
11	"I Don't Ever Want to See You Again"	Nathan Morris	5:42
12	"When I See You Smile" (from Touched by an Angel OST) (bonus track)	Diane Warren	4:50
13	"Underneath the Sheets" (feat. Ruff Endz) (bonus track)		4:52

== Charts ==
Chart (1997)	Peak position
US Billboard 200	7
US Top R&B/Hip-Hop Albums (Billboard)	10

== Certifications ==
Region	Certification	Certified units/sales
United States (RIAA)	Gold	500,000^{^}
^{^} Shipments figures based on certification alone.
