= Imagination (Tamia song) =

Single by Tamia featuring Jermaine Dupri

from the album Tamia
- Released: February 10, 1998
- Length: 3:36
- Label: Qwest; Warner Bros.
- Songwriters: Manuel Seal; Jermaine Mauldin; Berry Gordy; Alphonso Mizell; Freddie Perren; Deke Richards
- Producers: Manuel Seal; Jermaine Dupri

Tamia singles chronology
"Make Tonight Beautiful" (1997)	"Imagination" (1998)	"So Into You" (1998)

Jermaine Dupri singles chronology
"We Just Wanna Party with You" (1997)	"Imagination" (1998)	"The Party Continues" (1998)

"Imagination" is a song by Canadian singer Tamia, released as the first single from her self-titled debut album (1998). It was written and produced by Jermaine Dupri and his protégé Manuel Seal and features additional vocals by the former. "Imagination" is a mid-tempo R&B song that contains an interpolation from The Jackson 5's 1969 song "I Want You Back", written and produced by Motown's The Corporation team consisting of Berry Gordy, Fonce Mizell, Freddie Perren, and Deke Richards.

"Imagination" was released as Tamia's second overall solo single, after "Make Tonight Beautiful" the previous year from the Speed 2: Cruise Control soundtrack. Earlier appearances include featuring on mentor Quincy Jones's singles "You Put a Move on My Heart" and "Slow Jams", as well as "Missing You", a song she recorded with singers Brandy, Gladys Knight and Chaka Khan for the soundtrack of the 1996 motion picture Set It Off. While not as commercially successful as the latter, "Imagination" peaked at number 12 on the Hot Canadian Digital Singles chart and entered the top forty in New Zealand and on the US Billboard Hot 100. An accompanying music video was directed by Paul Hunter and references French playwright Jean Cocteau's classic film version of Beauty and the Beast (1946).

== Background ==
"Imagination" was written and produced by Jermaine Dupri and protégé Manuel Seal. The song is built around a sample of "I Want You Back" (1969) by American band the Jackson 5. Due to the inclusion of the sample, Motown's the Corporation team, consisting of Berry Gordy, Alphonzo Mizell, Freddie Perren, and Deke Richards, is also credited as songwriters. "Imagination" was among the last songs that Tamia recorded for her debut album. Commenting on its recording process, she elaborated: "When you work with Jermaine [Dupri], you party on Friday, Saturday and Sunday. Then you have like six hours left and then you have to go in the studio and work."

== Music video ==
An accompanying music video for "Imagination" was directed by Paul Hunter. For the highly stylized clip which features circus stars such as fire blowers, Hunter referenced French playwright Jean Cocteau's classic film version of Beauty and the Beast (1946), resulting in a contrast in styles between the video and the song. In a 1998 interview with MTV News, Tamia elaborated that "I think the video really caught a lot of people's attention. Because it wasn't the same fish lens with a shiny gloss and glitter falling from the sky and I think people were like, 'OK, it sounds like a hip-hop song to me, but she has a Nine Inch Nails video, so what's up with that?'." In a retrospective 2018 article for Billboard, she commented that initially, she did not understand the concept of looking into the camera while filming. Feeling distracted by people walking around on set, the crew had to put a black screen by the camera for her. The video received a nomination in the Urban/R&B Video of the Year category at the 1999 Music Video Production Association Awards.

== Track listings ==
CD single
No.	Title	Producer(s)	Length
1.	"Imagination" (Album Version featuring Jermaine Dupri)	Dupri; Manuel Seal^{[a]}	3:36
2.	"Imagination" (Album Version without Rap)	Dupri; Manuel Seal^{[a]}	2:55

Notes

- ^{^[a]} denotes additional producer

Sample credits

- "Imagination" contains an interpolation from "I Want You Back" (1969) as performed by The Jackson 5.

== Credits and personnel ==
Credits adapted from the liner notes of Tamia.

- Berry Gordy – writing (sample)
- Jermaine Dupri – production, rap
- Alphonzo Mizell – writing (sample)
- Freddie Perren – writing (sample)
- Deke Richards – writing (sample)
- Manuel Seal – co-production, backing vocals
- Phil Tan – mixing
- Tamia Washington – lead vocals, backing vocals

== Charts ==
=== Weekly charts ===
Chart (1998)	Peak position
Canada (Nielsen SoundScan)	12
Netherlands (Single Top 100)	90
New Zealand (Recorded Music NZ)	30
US Billboard Hot 100	37
US Hot R&B/Hip-Hop Songs (Billboard)	12
US Rhythmic Airplay (Billboard)	18

=== Year-end charts ===
Chart (1998)	Position
US Hot R&B/Hip-Hop Songs (Billboard)	50
