= 24 Hrs. to Live =

Song by Mase featuring The Lox, Black Rob and DMX

from the album Harlem World
- Released: February 20, 1998
- Recorded: 1997
- Genre: Hip-hop
- Length: 4:18
- Label: Bad Boy; Arista
- Songwriters: Carlos Broady; Deric "D-Dot" Angelettie; Mason Betha; David Styles; Jason Phillips; Sean Jacobs; Robert Ross; Earl Simmons; Nasheim Myrick; Sean "Puffy" Combs
- Producers: Carlos Broady; Nasheim Myrick

Music video
- "24 Hrs. to Live" on YouTube

"24 Hrs. to Live" is a song performed by American rapper Mase featuring colleagues The Lox, Black Rob and DMX, taken from his debut album, Harlem World (1997). It was released to radio airwaves on February 20, 1998, as an album cut and managed to chart solely on urban radio airplay. The same year, an all-female version of the song featuring Queen Pen, Lil' Kim, Foxy Brown and Missy "Misdemeanor" Elliott was discussed; however, plans for the project fell through, resulting in a cancellation. Mase later clarified in an interview that the female version was shelved due to his frustration with Foxy Brown not getting along with Lil' Kim or Queen Pen, also adding that he had "to move on with [his] life."

== Music video ==
Despite the lack of an official single release, the song acquired enough buzz for Mase to film a music video. The video was directed by Nick Quested and premiered on BET in mid-May 1998.

== Track listings and formats ==
12" vinyl

1. "24 Hrs. to Live" (Radio Mix) — 4:18
2. "24 Hrs. to Live" (Instrumental) — 4:38
3. "24 Hrs. to Live" (Club Mix) — 4:17
4. "24 Hrs. to Live" (Instrumental) — 4:38

== Charts ==
Chart (1998)	Peak position
U.S. Billboard Hot R&B Airplay	72
