= Deja Vu (Uptown Baby) =

Single by Lord Tariq and Peter Gunz

from the album Make It Reign
- Released: December 9, 1997
- Recorded: 1997
- Studio: The Cutting Room (New York City)
- Genre: East Coast hip-hop
- Length: 4:46; 3:29 (clean radio edit)
- Label: Columbia
- Songwriters: Walter Becker; Donald Fagen
- Producer: KNS

Music video
- "Deja Vu (Uptown Baby)" on YouTube

"Deja Vu (Uptown Baby)" is the debut single by American East Coast hip hop duo Lord Tariq and Peter Gunz, released in December 1997 through Columbia Records from their debut studio album Make It Reign. Produced by KNS, the song peaked at number nine on the US Billboard Hot 100, at number 21 on the UK Singles Chart, at number 29 on the Official New Zealand Music Chart, and was certified platinum by the Recording Industry Association of America on March 31, 1998, for sales of a million copies. It topped the Billboard Hot Rap Singles chart for five non-consecutive weeks and was the magazine's number-one rap song of the year, topping the Billboard Year-End Hot Rap Singles of 1998. However, the duo's success would be short-lived, as they broke up in 1999 without releasing a follow-up album or single.

Recording sessions took place at The Cutting Room in New York with recording engineer DJ Nastee assisted by David Crafa. It was mixed at The Hit Factory by Ken "Duro" Ifill assisted by Tony G. The song is built around a sample of Steely Dan's "Black Cow". In exchange for clearing use of the sample, Steely Dan requested an advance payment of $115,000 as well as 100% of publishing royalties, and as a result of this agreement, Steely Dan members Walter Becker and Donald Fagen are the sole credited songwriters on "Deja Vu (Uptown Baby)". The song opens with a sample from Jerry Rivera's "Amores Como El Nuestro", a song that would later gain worldwide exposure after being sampled by Shakira for her song "Hips Don't Lie".

Three remixes were made for the song: The Frankenstein remix produced by Frank "Frankenstein" Fallico, the Pro Black remix produced by Ayatollah, and a Bad Boy remix that was made by Ma$e, The LOX and Puff Daddy.

Tatyana Ali's song "Daydreamin'", released later in 1998, used the same "Black Cow" sample and featured both Tariq and Gunz. Gunz even mentions hearing "Black Cow" and being inspired to rap to the beat. The "J'Ty" remix of Beyoncé's "Me, Myself and I", which released in 2003, uses the same sample on "Deja Vu".

== Track listing ==
A-side

1. "Deja Vu (Uptown Baby)" (Album Version) – 4:44
2. "Deja Vu (Uptown Baby)" (Instrumental) – 4:43
3. "Deja Vu (Uptown Baby)" (Acapella) – 4:29

B-side

1. "Deja Vu (Uptown Baby)" (Frankenstein Remix) – 4:40
2. "Deja Vu (Uptown Baby)" (Frankenstein Remix Instrumental) – 4:42
3. "Deja Vu (Uptown Baby)" (Pro Black Remix) – 4:32
4. "Deja Vu (Uptown Baby)" (Pro Black Remix Instrumental) – 4:29

== Charts and certifications ==
=== Weekly charts ===
Chart (1997–1998)	Peak position
Canada (Nielsen SoundScan)	6
New Zealand (Recorded Music NZ)	29
Scotland Singles (OCC)	57
UK Singles (OCC)	21
UK Dance (OCC)	8
UK Hip Hop/R&B (OCC)	2
US Billboard Hot 100	9
US Dance Singles Sales (Billboard)	1
US Hot R&B/Hip-Hop Songs (Billboard)	4
US Hot Rap Songs (Billboard)	1
US Rhythmic Airplay (Billboard)	10

=== Year-end charts ===
Chart (1998)	Position
U.S. Billboard Hot 100	36
U.S. Billboard Hot Rap Singles	1

=== Certifications ===
Region	Certification	Certified units/sales
United States (RIAA)	Platinum	1,000,000
