= What You Want (Mase song) =

1997 single by Mase

Single by Mase featuring Total

from the album Harlem World
- B-side: "What You Want" (remix)
- Released: December 3, 1997
- Length: 4:02
- Label: Bad Boy Entertainment
- Songwriters: Mason Betha; Keisha Spivey; Nashiem Myrick; Sean Combs; Curtis Mayfield
- Producer: Nashiem Myrick

Mase singles chronology
"Been Around the World" (1997)	"What You Want" (1997)	"Horse & Carriage" (1998)

Total singles chronology
"What About Us" (1997)	"What You Want" (1997)	"Trippin'" (1998)

Music video
- "What You Want" on YouTube

"What You Want", also known as "Tell Me What You Want", is a song by American rapper Mase, featuring vocals from R&B girl group Total. It was released as the second single from the Mase's debut album, Harlem World, by Bad Boy Entertainment on December 3, 1997. Mase co-wrote the song with Keisha Spivey, Nashiem Myrick, and Sean Combs, and it was produced by Myrick. It contains a sample of "Right on for the Darkness" by Curtis Mayfield.

As with Mase's previous single, "What You Want" proved commercially successful, peaking at number six on the US Billboard Hot 100 and becoming his second consecutive top ten single; it received gold certification by the Recording Industry Association of America (RIAA). In New Zealand, the song reached number five, and it entered the top 20 in Canada and the United Kingdom.

== Reception ==
Music journalist Cheo Hodari Coker, writing for the Los Angeles Times, called the single "one of the most enticing rap ballads since Rakim’s 'Mahogany.'"

== Track listing ==
A-side

1. "What You Want" (album version) – 4:04
2. "What You Want" (instrumental) – 4:38

B-side

1. "What You Want" (remix) – 4:34
2. "What You Want" (remix instrumental) – 4:34

== Charts ==
=== Weekly charts ===
Chart (1998)	Peak position
Canada (Nielsen SoundScan)	12
Europe (Eurochart Hot 100)	37
Germany (GfK)	35
Ireland (IRMA)	27
New Zealand (Recorded Music NZ)	5
Scottish Singles Sales (Official Charts)	53
UK Singles (Official Charts)	15
UK Dance (Official Charts)	6
UK Hip Hop/R&B (Official Charts)	3
US Billboard Hot 100	6
US Dance Singles Sales (Billboard)	4
US Hot R&B/Hip-Hop Songs (Billboard)	3
US Hot Rap Songs (Billboard)	3
US Rhythmic Airplay (Billboard)	5

=== Year-end charts ===
Chart (1998)	Position
New Zealand (RIANZ)	31
UK Urban (Music Week)	3
US Billboard Hot 100	31
US Hot R&B Singles (Billboard)	14
US Hot Rap Singles (Billboard)	3
US Rhythmic Top 40 (Billboard)	14

== Certifications ==
Region	Certification	Certified units/sales
New Zealand (RMNZ)	Platinum	30,000^{‡}
United States (RIAA)	Gold	900,000
^{‡} Sales+streaming figures based on certification alone.

== Release history ==
Region	Date	Format(s)	Label(s)	Ref.
United States	December 1, 1997	Urban radio	Bad Boy Entertainment	
United Kingdom	April 6, 1998	12-inch vinyl; CD; cassette	Puff Daddy; Arista; BMG	
