= The Party Continues =

Single by Jermaine Dupri featuring Da Brat and Usher

from the album Life in 1472
- Released: February 17, 1998
- Recorded: 1997
- Genre: Hip-hop
- Length: 4:16
- Label: So So Def; Columbia
- Songwriter(s): Jermaine Mauldin; Shawntae Harris; Larry Blackmon; Thomas Jenkins; Nathan Leftenant; Charlie Singleton
- Producer(s): Jermaine Dupri; Carl-So-Lowe

Jermaine Dupri singles chronology
"Imagination" (1998)	"The Party Continues" (1998)	"With Me" (1998)

Da Brat singles chronology
"Sock It 2 Me" (1997)	"The Party Continues" (1998)	"It's Nothing" (1999)

Usher singles chronology
"Nice & Slow" (1998)	"The Party Continues" (1998)	"My Way" (1998)

"The Party Continues" is the lead single released from Jermaine Dupri's debut studio album, Life in 1472. Written and produced by Dupri himself, the song featured a verse from Da Brat and a chorus sung by Usher. The song samples "She’s Strange" by Cameo.

The single eventually became a top 40 hit, peaking at No. 29 on the Billboard Hot 100 during the week of March 28, 1998. It also was certified gold by the Recording Industry Association of America for sales of 500,000 copies and reached 92 on Billboard Year-End Hot 100 singles of 1998 as one of the years most popular and successful songs.

== Single track listing ==
1. "The Party Continues"- 4:03
2. "We Just Wanna Party"- 3:49
3. "We Just Wanna Party" (Instrumental)- 3:49
4. "The Party Continues" (Instrumental)- 4:02
5. "The Party Continues" (Acappella)- 3:52

== Charts and certifications ==
=== Weekly charts ===
Chart (1998)	Peak position
Billboard Hot 100	29
Billboard Hot R&B/Hip-Hop Singles & Tracks	14
Billboard Hot Rap Singles	6
Billboard Hot Dance Music/Maxi-Singles Sales	16

=== Year-end charts ===
Chart (1998)	Position
U.S. Billboard Hot 100	92

=== Certifications ===
Region	Certification	Certified units/sales
United States (RIAA)	Gold	500,000
