= Second Round K.O. =

1998 song by Canibus

Single by Canibus

from the album Can-I-Bus
- Released: March 24, 1998
- Recorded: 1997
- Genre: Hip-hop
- Length: 4:37
- Label: Universal
- Songwriter: Germaine Williams
- Producer: Wyclef Jean

Canibus singles chronology
"4, 3, 2, 1" (1997)	"Second Round K.O." (1998)	"How Come" (1998)

"Second Round K.O." is a single from rapper Canibus' debut album, Can-I-Bus. The song was produced by Wyclef Jean and his cousin Jerry Wonder and features spoken vocals from boxer Mike Tyson.

The song became Canibus's only top 40 single, peaking at number 28 on the Billboard Hot 100.

== Background ==
"Second Round K.O." is a diss track by Canibus directed at LL Cool J. The feud had started after Canibus' appearance on LL's "4, 3, 2, 1". Canibus' original verse contained the lyrics "L, is that a mic on your arm? Let me borrow that", which LL took offense to. LL responded by writing an indirect diss towards Canibus on the same song. Prior to the song's release, LL approached Canibus and told him that if he wanted to remain on the song, he would have to change his lines, to which Canibus agreed, however, LL kept his original verse. When Canibus' original verse leaked, a feud started between the two rappers. LL suggested the two make a song together to squash the beef after he was done filming Any Given Sunday, Canibus, however, recorded and released "Second Round K.O." instead. LL would respond with "The Ripper Strikes Back" and "Back Where I Belong" and even thanked Canibus in the liner notes of his album G.O.A.T. for "inspiration". In the song, Canibus says "the greatest rapper of all time died on March 9.", in reference to the Notorious B.I.G., who died on March 9, 1997. Canibus followed up his diss 1 year later, with a record entitled "Rip the Jacker", over a polished remake of the beat from LL Cool J's "I'm Bad".

== Track listings ==
CD single

1. "Second Round K.O." (LP Version) - 4:02
2. "Second Round K.O." (Clean) - 4:02
3. "Second Round K.O." (Instrumental) - 3:53
4. "How We Roll" (LP version) - 4:17
5. "How We Roll" (Clean) - 4:18

12" single

Side A

1. "Second Round K.O." (Main) - 4:02
2. "Second Round K.O." (Album version) - 4:02

Side B

1. "How We Roll" (Main version) - 4:17
2. "How We Roll" (Clean) - 4:18

== Charts ==
=== Weekly charts ===
Chart (1998)	Peak position
Billboard Hot 100	28
Billboard Hot R&B/Hip-Hop Singles & Tracks	13
Billboard Hot Rap Singles	3
Billboard Hot Dance Music/Maxi-Singles Sales	5
Canada (Canadian Singles Chart)	9

=== Year-end charts ===
Chart (1998)	Position
Billboard Hot R&B/Hip-Hop Singles & Tracks	68
Billboard Hot Rap Singles	13

== See also ==
- List of notable diss tracks
