= 4, 3, 2, 1 (LL Cool J song) =

1997 single by LL Cool J featuring Method Man, Redman, Master P, DMX, and Canibus

Single by LL Cool J featuring Method Man, Redman, Master P, DMX and Canibus

from the album Phenomenon
- B-side: "4, 3, 2, 1"
- Released: December 9, 1997
- Recorded: 1997
- Genre: East Coast hip-hop
- Length: 4:16
- Label: Def Jam; PolyGram
- Songwriters: James Smith; Clifford Smith; Reggie Noble; Germaine Williams; Percy Miller; Earl Simmons
- Producer: Erick Sermon

LL Cool J singles chronology
"Phenomenon" (1997)	"4, 3, 2, 1" (1997)	"Father" (1998)

Method Man singles chronology
"Hit 'Em High (The Monstars' Anthem)" (1996)	"4, 3, 2, 1" (1997)	"Judgement Day" (1998)

Redman singles chronology
"Lose My Cool" (1997)	"4, 3, 2, 1" (1997)	"Made It Back" (1998)

Master P singles chronology
"I Miss My Homies" (1997)	"4, 3, 2, 1" (1997)	"Make 'Em Say Uhh!" (1998)

Canibus singles chronology
"4, 3, 2, 1" (1997)	"Second Round K.O." (1998)

DMX singles chronology
"Born Loser" (1993)	"4, 3, 2, 1" (1997)	"Shut 'Em Down" (1998)

Music video
- "4, 3, 2, 1" on YouTube

"4, 3, 2, 1" is a song by Queens rapper LL Cool J featuring Method Man, Redman, Canibus and DMX from LL Cool J's seventh album Phenomenon as the second single. It was released on December 9, 1997, for Def Jam Recordings and was produced by Erick Sermon. The single featured an extended version not featured on the album featuring an additional verse from Southern hip hop rapper Master P. Both the original song (without Canibus) and the extended cut (with Canibus and Master P) had accompanying music videos (directed by Diane Martel). The song peaked at number 75 on the Billboard Hot 100, number 10 on the Hot Rap Singles and number 24 Hot R&B/Hip-Hop Songs.

== Controversy ==
The song is notable for starting the LL Cool J vs. Canibus feud, LL took offense to the lines, "L, is that a mic on your arm? Let me borrow that", which referenced his tattoo of a microphone on his arm – and which Canibus claimed was his own way of showing the rap veteran respect – and wrote an indirect diss to Canibus:

"The symbol on my arm is off limits to challengers / You hold the rusty sword, I swing the Excalibur"

And also:

"Now let's get back to this mic on my arm / If it ever left my side, it'll transform into a time bomb / You don't wanna borrow that, you wanna idolize / And you don't wanna make me mad, nigga, you wanna socialize."

Before the song was released, LL Cool J asked Canibus to change his lines. Canibus claims that LL Cool J vowed to modify his own lines as well, but the latter denied this and pointed out that nobody would know who he was talking about if only Canibus's line was changed. The original version eventually leaked, and fans started to piece the lines together. In 1998, Canibus would later respond to the diss with "Second Round K.O.". LL Cool J would then respond to that diss with the "Ripper Strikes Back". On his 2000 G.O.A.T. album, LL Cool J thanked Canibus for inspiration. In addition, despite appearing on the song, Canibus was omitted from the original music video for the song due to the feud, but was later included in the music video for the remix version.

== Samples ==
This song features a vocal sample from LL Cool J's 1985 song "Rock the Bells" off LL's album "Radio". Another prominent sample featured in the song is from a The Beastie Boys song "(You Gotta) Fight for Your Right (To Party!)". And "Superrappin’" by Grandmaster Flash and The Furious Five.

== Track listing ==
=== A-side ===
1. "4, 3, 2, 1" (radio edit)
2. "4, 3, 2, 1" (regular version)
3. "4, 3, 2, 1" (instrumental)

=== B-side ===
1. "4, 3, 2, 1" (radio edit)
2. "4, 3, 2, 1" (regular version)
3. "4, 3, 2, 1" (a cappella)

== Charts ==
=== Weekly charts ===
Weekly chart performance for "4, 3, 2, 1"
Chart (1997–1998)	Peak position
US Billboard Hot 100	75
US Hot Dance Music/Maxi-Singles Sales (Billboard)	5
US Hot R&B/Hip-Hop Songs (Billboard)	24
US Hot Rap Songs (Billboard)	10

=== Year-end charts ===
Year-end chart performance for "4, 3, 2, 1"
Chart (1998)	Position
US Billboard Hot R&B/Hip-Hop Singles & Tracks	96
