= I Don't Ever Want to See You Again =

1997 single by Uncle Sam

Single by Uncle Sam

from the album Uncle Sam
- B-side: "Can You Feel It"
- Released: September 23, 1997
- Length: 5:43 (album version); 4:12 (single edit)
- Label: Epic; Stonecreek
- Songwriter: Nathan Morris
- Producer: Nathan Morris

Uncle Sam singles chronology
"I Don't Ever Want to See You Again" (1997)	"Can You Feel It" (1997)

Music video
- "I Don't Ever Want to See You Again" on YouTube

"I Don't Ever Want to See You Again" is a song by American R&B singer Uncle Sam. It is the closing track on his eponymous debut album and was issued as the album's lead single. The song was written and produced by Boyz II Men member Nathan Morris. Released in September 1997, it was Uncle Sam's only hit on the US Billboard Hot 100, peaking at number six in 1998. The single was certified platinum by the Recording Industry Association of America (RIAA) on April 6, 1998. Worldwide, the song peaked at number eight in New Zealand and reached the top 40 in Australia, the Netherlands, and the United Kingdom.

== Music video ==
The official music video for the song was directed by Christopher Erskin and Nathan Morris.

== Charts ==
=== Weekly charts ===
Chart (1998)	Peak position
Australia (ARIA)	36
Netherlands (Dutch Top 40)	22
Netherlands (Single Top 100)	21
New Zealand (Recorded Music NZ)	8
Scottish Singles Sales (Official Charts)	83
UK Singles (Official Charts)	30
UK Hip Hop/R&B (Official Charts)	6
US Billboard Hot 100	6
US Hot R&B Singles (Billboard)	2
US Mainstream Top 40 (Billboard)	28
US Rhythmic Top 40 (Billboard)	3

=== Year-end-charts ===
Chart (1998)	Position
US Billboard Hot 100	26
US Hot R&B Singles (Billboard)	9
US Mainstream Top 40 (Billboard)	94
US Rhythmic Top 40 (Billboard)	13

== Certifications ==
Region	Certification	Certified units/sales
United States (RIAA)	Platinum	1,000,000^{^}
^{^} Shipments figures based on certification alone.

== Release history ==
Region	Date	Format(s)	Label(s)	Ref.
United States	September 23, 1997	Radio	Epic; Stonecreek	
United States	October 28, 1997	Rhythmic contemporary radio	Epic; Stonecreek	
United Kingdom	May 4, 1998	CD; cassette	Epic; Stonecreek	
