= Say It (Voices of Theory song) =

1998 single by Voices of Theory

Single by Voices of Theory

from the album Voices of Theory
- B-side: "Dimelo"
- Released: February 24, 1998
- Recorded: 1997
- Genre: R&B
- Length: 4:27
- Label: H.O.L.A./PolyGram
- Songwriter(s): Raymond Basora; Steve Morales
- Producer(s): Steve Morales

Voices of Theory singles chronology
"Somehow" (1997)	"Say It" (1998)	"Wherever You Go" (1998)

"Say It" is a song performed by American contemporary R&B group Voices of Theory, issued as the second single from their eponymous studio album. The song was their biggest hit on the Billboard Hot 100, peaking at #10 on the chart in 1998.

== Chart positions ==
Chart (1998)	Peak position
US Billboard Hot 100	10
US Hot R&B Singles (Billboard)	17
