= Lookin' at Me =

Single by Mase featuring Puff Daddy

from the album Harlem World
- B-side: "24 Hrs. to Live"
- Released: July 7, 1998
- Recorded: 1997
- Genre: Hip-hop
- Length: 4:17
- Label: Bad Boy; Arista
- Songwriters: Mason Betha; Sean Combs; Pharrell Williams; Charles Hugo
- Producer: The Neptunes

Mase singles chronology
"Horse & Carriage" (1998)	"Lookin' at Me" (1998)	"Top of the World" (1998)

Puff Daddy singles chronology
"Come with Me" (1998)	"Lookin' at Me" (1998)	"All Night Long" (1999)

"Lookin' at Me" is the third and final single released from Mase's debut album, Harlem World. The song was produced by the Neptunes and featured Puff Daddy. The single was yet another success for Mase, becoming his third consecutive top 10 hit, peaking at #8 on the Billboard Hot 100, and was certified gold on August 17, 1998. The song was paired with "24 Hrs. to Live", which featured Black Rob, DMX and the Lox.

Along with Noreaga's "Superthug", the song was one of the first high-profile productions by Virginia production team the Neptunes.

Promotional music videos were released for both "Lookin' at Me" and "24 Hrs. to Live."

Kanye West's 2012 song "Cold" uses some of the lyrics from "Lookin' at Me" Which in turn, both songs interpolated LL Cool J's "Illegal Search" from his fourth album Mama Said Knock You Out (1990).

== Single track listing ==
=== A-side ===
1. "Lookin' at Me" – 4:21
2. "24 Hrs. to Live" – 4:25 (featuring Black Rob, DMX and the Lox)
3. "Wanna Hurt Mase?" – 4:25

=== B-side ===
1. "Lookin' at Me" (Instrumental) – 5:04
2. "24 Hrs. to Live" (Instrumental) – 4:36

== Charts and certifications ==
=== Weekly charts ===
Chart (1998)	Position
U.S. Billboard Hot 100	8
U.S. Billboard Hot R&B/Hip-Hop Singles & Tracks	8
U.S. Billboard Hot Rap Singles	1
U.S. Rhythmic Top 40	30
Canadian Singles Chart	17

=== Year-end charts ===
Chart (1998)	Position
U.S. Billboard Hot 100	59

=== Certifications ===
Region	Certification	Certified units/sales
United States (RIAA)	Gold	806,000
