= Voices of Theory =

American contemporary R&B group

- Genres: R&B
- Years active: 1990s
- Labels: H.O.L.A./PolyGram

Voices of Theory is an American contemporary R&B group that was active in the early 1990s. The group released their eponymous debut album in 1997, which produced the hit singles "Say It" and "Wherever You Go"; which peaked at #10 and #36, respectively, on the Billboard Hot 100.

== Discography ==
- Voices of Theory (H.O.L.A. Recordings, 1997) #32 Billboard Heatseekers Albums, #56 R&B Albums

== Singles ==
| Year | Title | Chart Positions | |
| Year | Title | Billboard Hot 100 | US Hot Hip-Hop & R&B Singles |
|---|---|---|---|
| 1997 | "Somehow" feat. Mona Lisa & Kurupt | - | 95 |
| 1998 | "Say It" | 10 | 17 |
| 1998 | "Wherever You Go" | 36 | 22 |
