= Father (LL Cool J song) =

Single by LL Cool J

from the album Phenomenon
- B-side: "4, 3, 2, 1"
- Released: January 13, 1998
- Recorded: 1997
- Genre: Hip hop; gospel
- Length: 4:44
- Label: Def Jam
- Songwriters: James Todd Smith; Jean-Claude Olivier; Samuel Barnes; George Michael
- Producer: Trackmasters

LL Cool J singles chronology
"4, 3, 2, 1" (1997)	"Father" (1998)	"Hot, Hot, Hot" (1998)

"Father" is the third single from LL Cool J's seventh album, Phenomenon. It was released on January 13, 1998 for Def Jam Recordings and was produced by the Trackmasters.

"Father", which was an auto-biographical song that detailed LL's father, would prove to be the most successful single from the album, it made it to number 18 on the Billboard Hot 100 and became his eighth single to reach number one on the Hot Rap Singles. It sold 500,000 copies. The song's main sample is "Father Figure" by George Michael.

The music video was directed by Samuel Bayer.

== Track listing ==
=== A-side ===
1. "Father" (radio edit) – 3:57
2. "Father" (instrumental) – 4:42

=== B-side ===
1. "4, 3, 2, 1" (remix instrumental) – 5:00
2. "4, 3, 2, 1" (instrumental) – 4:15

== Charts ==
=== Weekly charts ===
Weekly chart performance for "Father"
Chart (1998)	Peak position
New Zealand (Recorded Music NZ)	27
Scotland Singles (OCC)	31
UK Singles (OCC)	10
UK Dance (OCC)	4
UK Hip Hop/R&B (OCC)	2
US Billboard Hot 100	18
US Hot R&B/Hip-Hop Songs (Billboard)	12
US Hot Rap Songs (Billboard)	1
US Rhythmic Airplay (Billboard)	23

=== Year-end charts ===
Year-end chart performance for "Father"
Chart (1998)	Position
US Billboard Hot 100	97
US Billboard Hot R&B/Hip-Hop Singles & Tracks	80
US Billboard Hot Rap Singles	14
