= Uncle Sam (singer) =

American R&B singer

- Born: Sam Turner; May 31, 1971 (age 54); Detroit, Michigan, U.S.
- Genres: R&B
- Occupations: Singer
- Label: Stonecreek

Uncle Sam (born Sam Turner; May 31, 1971 in Detroit, Michigan, United States) is an American R&B singer. He is best known for being signed to Boyz II Men's Stonecreek Records imprint (distributed by Epic Records) in the late 1990s.

One of his hits was the Nathan Morris-penned "I Don't Ever Want to See You Again" released on October 14, 1997, which reached number 6 on the Hot 100 chart, and No. 2 on the US R&B chart in 1998. The same track reached No. 30 on the UK Singles Chart in May 1998. The record sold over one million copies, gaining platinum status.

== Discography ==
=== Albums ===
List of albums, with selected chart positions
Title	Album details	Peak chart positions		Certifications
Title	Album details	US	US R&B	Certifications
Uncle Sam	Released: October 17, 1997; Label: Epic	7	10	RIAA: Gold

=== Charted singles ===
List of singles, with selected chart positions
Title	Year	Peak chart positions				
Title	Year	US	AUS	NLD	NZ	UK
"I Don't Ever Want to See You Again"	1998	6	36	21	8	30
