= Feel So Good =

1997 single by Mase

Single by Mase featuring Kelly Price

from the album Harlem World and Money Talks soundtrack
- B-side: "Feel So Good"
- Released: September 9, 1997
- Length: 3:24
- Label: Bad Boy
- Songwriters: Mason Durell Betha; Robert Earl Bell; Ronald Bell; George Brown; Robert Mickens; Claydes Smith; Dennis Thomas; Richard Westfield; Lawrence Dermer; Joe Galdo; Rafael Vigil
- Producers: D-Dot; Sean "Puffy" Combs

Mase singles chronology
"You Should Be Mine (Don't Waste Your Time)" (1997)	"Feel So Good" (1997)	"Been Around the World" (1997)

Music video
- "Feel So Good" on YouTube

"Feel So Good" is a song by American rapper Mase, released by Bad Boy Records on September 9, 1997, as both his debut single and the lead single from his debut album, Harlem World (1997). The song also acted as lead single for the soundtrack to the Chris Tucker film Money Talks. Its production – which samples Kool & the Gang's "Hollywood Swinging" and interpolates the Miami Sound Machine's "Bad Boy" – was handled by Bad Boy's in-house producer Deric Angelettie, as well as label boss Sean "Puffy" Combs. The latter provides backing vocals, while R&B singer Kelly Price performs the chorus.

"Feel So Good" brought Mase the most commercial success as a lead artist. It peaked at number five on both the US Billboard Hot 100 and the Billboard Hot R&B Singles chart, as well as number one on the Billboard Hot Rap Singles chart. Internationally, it entered the top 10 in Canada, New Zealand, and the United Kingdom. Chris Tucker, Mase and Combs appear in the music video, which was directed by Hype Williams. It depicts the trio driving around Las Vegas in a Mercedes-Benz, as a group of female dancers are also shown dancing with them.

== Music video ==
The music video was filmed at Fremont Street in Las Vegas, Nevada. It was released for the week ending on October 12, 1997.

== Charts ==
=== Weekly charts ===
Chart (1997–1998)	Peak position
Australia (ARIA)	86
Canada (Nielsen SoundScan)	3
Canada Dance/Urban (RPM)	1
Europe (Eurochart Hot 100)	47
Netherlands (Dutch Top 40)	31
Netherlands (Single Top 100)	31
New Zealand (Recorded Music NZ)	9
Scottish Singles Sales (Official Charts)	29
UK Singles (Official Charts)	10
UK Dance (Official Charts)	5
UK Hip Hop/R&B (Official Charts)	3
US Billboard Hot 100	5
US Hot R&B/Hip-Hop Songs (Billboard)	5
US Hot Rap Songs (Billboard)	1
US Pop Airplay (Billboard)	36
US Rhythmic Airplay (Billboard)	4

=== Year-end charts ===
Chart (1997)	Position
US Hot R&B Singles (Billboard)	86
US Hot Rap Singles (Billboard)	26
US Rhythmic Top 40 (Billboard)	83

Chart (1998)	Position
UK Urban (Music Week)	34
US Billboard Hot 100	44
US Hot R&B Singles (Billboard)	53
US Rhythmic Top 40 (Billboard)	45

== Certifications ==
Region	Certification	Certified units/sales
New Zealand (RMNZ)	Platinum	30,000^{‡}
United Kingdom (BPI)	Gold	400,000^{‡}
United States (RIAA)	Platinum	1,000,000^{^}
^{^} Shipments figures based on certification alone.^{‡} Sales+streaming figures based on certification alone.

== Release history ==
Region	Date	Format(s)	Label(s)	Ref.
United States	September 9, 1997	Rhythmic contemporary radio	Bad Boy	
United Kingdom	December 15, 1997	12-inch vinyl; CD; cassette	Puff Daddy; Arista; BMG	

== In popular culture ==
The music video was spoofed in a scene in South Park: Bigger, Longer & Uncut where Terrance and Phillip do a hip hop remix of their song Uncle Fucka. The song was used at the beginning of the Ms. Marvel episode "Crushed".
