= Romeo and Juliet (Sylk-E. Fyne song) =

Single by Sylk-E. Fyne featuring Chill

from the album Raw Sylk
- B-side: "Keep It Real"
- Released: January 27, 1998
- Recorded: 1997
- Genre: Hip hop, R&B
- Length: 4:18
- Label: RCA
- Songwriters: La'Mar Johnson, William Warner, René Moore, Angela Winbush
- Producers: Gerald Baillergeau, Victor Merritt

Sylk-E. Fyne singles chronology
"Romeo and Juliet" (1998)	"Ya Style" (2000)

"Romeo and Juliet" is the only single released from Sylk-E. Fyne's debut album, Raw Sylk. The song was released on January 27, 1998, with production from Gerald Baillergeau and Victor Merritt and a guest appearance from William "Chill" Warner. The song was a hit on Mainstream Urban radio stations in February 1998. The music video was released in January 1998 and had heavy rotation on the B.E.T. network. It contains an interpolation of "You Don't Have To Cry" by Rene & Angela.

The song quickly became a success, rising to #6 on the Billboard 100 and #1 on the rap charts. However, her album failed to match the single's success as Raw Sylk struggled sales-wise, and she was dropped from her label, RCA Records. Though her next single, 2000's "Ya Style" found some success on the rap charts (peaking at #17), "Romeo and Juliet" remains both Sylk-E. Fyne and Chill's only top 40 hit on the Billboard 200.

"Romeo and Juliet" was certified gold by the RIAA on March 30, 1998 for sales of over 500,000 copies.

== Single track listing ==
=== A-Side ===
1. "Romeo and Juliet" (LP version) – 4:34
2. "Romeo and Juliet" (Radio edit) – 4:10
3. "Romeo and Juliet" (Instrumental) – 4:24

=== B-Side ===
1. "Keep It Real" (LP Version) – 4:02
2. "Keep It Real" (Instrumental) – 4:16
3. "Keep It Real" (A Cappella) – 3:53

== Charts and certifications ==
=== Weekly charts ===
Chart (1998)	Peak position
Billboard Hot 100	6
Billboard Hot R&B/Hip-Hop Singles & Tracks	5
Billboard Hot Rap Singles	1
Billboard Rhythmic Top 40	6
Canada	10

=== Certifications ===
Region	Certification	Certified units/sales
United States (RIAA)	Gold	800,000
