= Sylk-E. Fyne =

American rapper

- Also known as: D. Johnson; Lamar Johnson; Sylk E Fine; Sylk
- Born: La'Mar Lorraine Johnson; July 12, 1977 (age 49)
- Origin: Los Angeles, California, U.S.
- Genres: R&B, Hip hop
- Years active: 1994 – Present
- Labels: RCA Records; Rufftown Records; Ruthless Records

La'Mar Lorraine Johnson (born July 12, 1977) commonly known as Sylk-E. Fyne Is an American female rapper from South Central Los Angeles and is a former member of the female rap group Gangsta Bitch Mentality from Eazy-Es record label Ruthless Records.

Johnson started rapping in college where she would eventually get her college degree.

Her first single from her debut album Raw Sylk, Romeo and Juliet topped charts at number one on US Hot Rap Singles

== Discography ==
=== Studio albums ===
- Raw Sylk (RCA Records, 1998) Billboard Top 200 peak #121, R&B peak #47
- Tha Cum Up (Rufftown Records, 2000)

=== Singles ===
Year	Title	Chart positions			Album
Year	Title	Billboard Hot 100	US Hot Hip-Hop & R&B Singles	US Hot Rap Singles	Album
1998	"Romeo and Juliet" (feat. Chill)	6	5	1	Raw Sylk
2000	"Ya Style" (feat. Snoop Dogg & Bizzy Bone)	–	–	17	Tha Cum Up
