= LL Cool J discography =

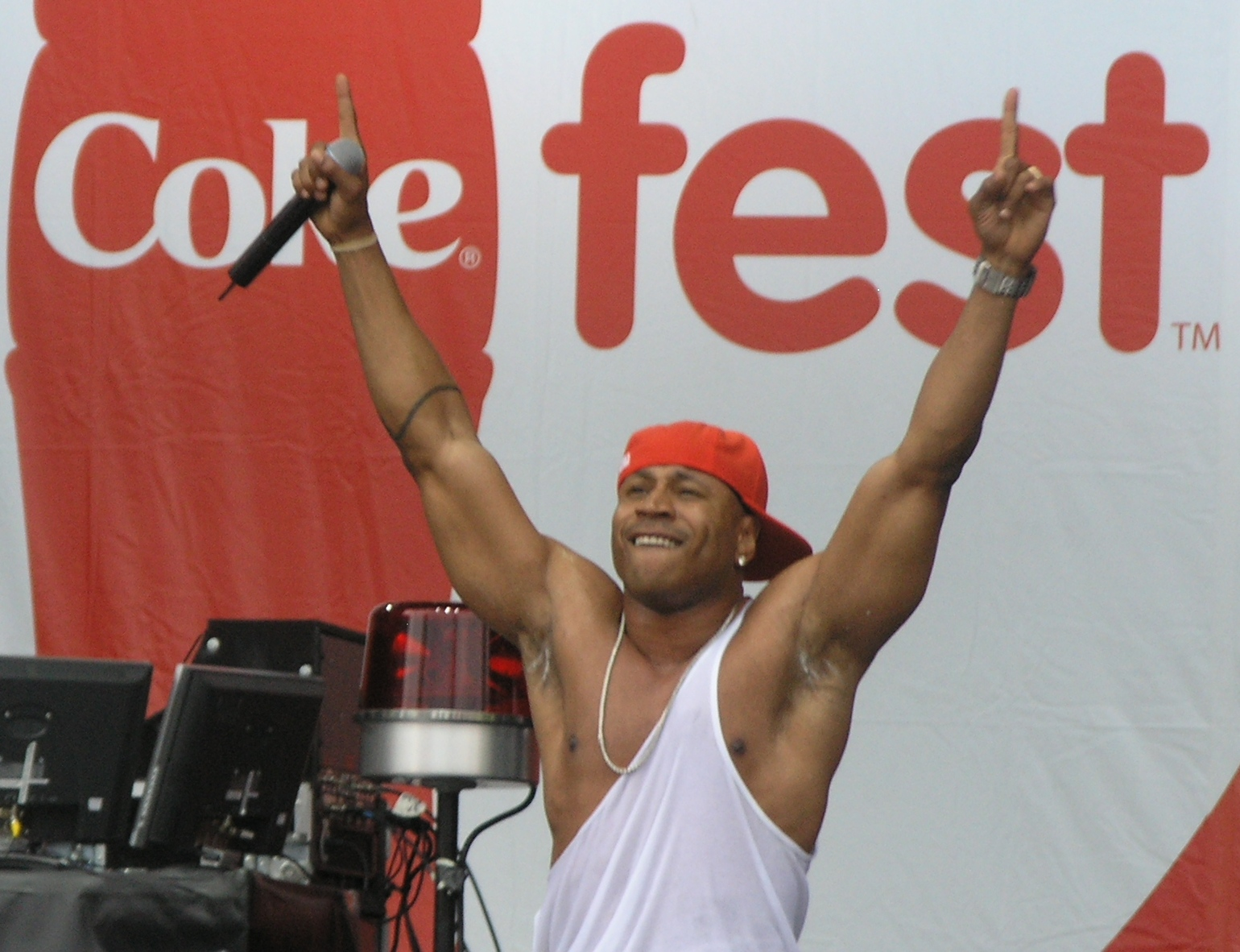
- LL Cool J at the MyCokeFest in Atlanta, Georgia, 2007
- Studio albums: 14
- Compilation albums: 2
- Singles: 62

This is the discography of American rapper LL Cool J.

== Albums ==
=== Studio albums ===
Title	Album details	Peak chart positions										Sales	Certifications (sales thresholds)
Title	Album details	US	US R&B	AUS	CAN	FRA	GER	NED	NZ	SWI	UK	Sales	Certifications (sales thresholds)
Radio	Released: November 18, 1985; Label: Def Jam, Columbia; Formats: CD, LP, cassette, digital download	46	6	—	—	—	—	—	—	—	71		RIAA: Platinum
Bigger and Deffer	Released: June 2, 1987; Label: Def Jam, Columbia; Formats: CD, LP, cassette, digital download	3	1	—	39	—	35	28	23	—	54		RIAA: 2× Platinum; MC: Gold
Walking with a Panther	Released: June 9, 1989; Label: Def Jam, Columbia; Formats: CD, LP, cassette, digital download	6	1	85	64	—	—	63	48	—	43		RIAA: Platinum
Mama Said Knock You Out	Released: September 14, 1990; Label: Def Jam, Columbia; Formats: CD, LP, cassette, digital download	16	2	67	32	—	—	—	—	—	49		RIAA: 2× Platinum; MC: Gold
14 Shots to the Dome	Released: March 30, 1993; Label: Def Jam, Columbia; Formats: CD, LP, cassette, digital download	5	1	112	—	—	74	—	36	—	74		RIAA: Gold
Mr. Smith	Released: November 21, 1995; Label: Def Jam; Formats: CD, LP, cassette, digital download	20	4	97	53	—	75	33	—	—	90		RIAA: 2× Platinum; BPI: Silver; MC: Platinum
Phenomenon	Released: October 14, 1997; Label: Def Jam; Formats: CD, LP, cassette, digital download	7	4	88	7	—	24	48	39	48	37		RIAA: Platinum; MC: Platinum
G.O.A.T. (Greatest of All Time)	Released: September 12, 2000; Label: Def Jam; Formats: CD, LP, cassette, digital download	1	1	65	5	56	17	35	—	13	29		RIAA: Gold; MC: Gold
10	Released: October 15, 2002; Label: Def Jam; Formats: CD, LP, cassette, digital download	2	1	—	—	106	64	100	—	19	26		RIAA: Gold; BPI: Silver
The DEFinition	Released: August 31, 2004; Label: Def Jam; Formats: CD, LP, cassette, digital download	4	3	—	23	136	50	85	—	35	66		RIAA: Gold
Todd Smith	Released: April 11, 2006; Label: Def Jam; Formats: CD, LP, cassette, digital download	6	2	—	40	—	—	99	—	64	79		RIAA: Gold
Exit 13	Released: September 9, 2008; Label: Def Jam; Formats: CD, LP, digital download	9	3	—	61	—	—	—	—	75	—	US: 80,000	
Authentic	Released: April 30, 2013; Label: S-BRO; Formats: CD, LP, digital download	23	7	—	—	—	87	—	—	57	—	US: 26,000	
The FORCE	Released: September 6, 2024; Label: Def Jam; Formats: CD, LP, digital download	50	11	—	—	—	—	—	—	71	— (Note: "The FORCE" did not enter the UK Albums Chart Top 100, but debuted and peaked at number 22 on the UK Albums Download Chart and at number 1 on the UK Hip-Hop & R&B Albums Chart.)	US: 16,000	

=== Compilation albums ===
Title	Album details	Peak chart positions								Certifications (sales thresholds)
Title	Album details	US	US R&B	CAN	GER	NED	SWE	SWI	UK	Certifications (sales thresholds)
All World: Greatest Hits	Released: November 5, 1996; Label: Def Jam; Formats: CD, LP, cassette, digital download	29	21	20	46	31	32	45	23	RIAA: Platinum; MC: Gold; BPI: Gold
All World 2	Released: December 8, 2009; Label: Def Jam; Formats: CD, digital download	—	—	—	—	—	—	—	—	
"—" denotes a recording that did not chart or was not released in that territory.

== Singles ==
=== As lead artist ===
List of singles, with selected chart positions and certifications, showing year released and album name
Title	Year	Peak chart positions										Certifications	Album
Title	Year	US	US Dance	US R&B/HH	US Rap	AUS	GER	NED	NZ	SWI	UK	Certifications	Album
"I Need a Beat"	1984	—	—	—	*	—	—	—	—	—	—		Radio
"I Can't Live Without My Radio"	1985	—	— (Note: "I Can Give You More/I Can't Live Without My Radio" did not enter the Dance Club Songs, but peaked at number 21 on the Dance Singles Sales.)	15	*	—	—	—	—	—	95		Krush Groove Soundtrack and Radio
"I Can Give You More"	1985	—	—	—	*	—	—	—	—	—	—		Radio
"I Want You/Dangerous"	1985	—	—	—	*	—	—	—	—	—	—		Radio
"Rock the Bells"	1986	—	35	17	*	—	—	—	—	—	98		Radio
"You'll Rock"	1986	—	—	59	*	—	—	—	—	—	—		Radio
"You Can't Dance"	1986	—	—	—	*	—	—	—	—	—	—		Radio
"I'm Bad"	1987	84	34	4	*	—	—	74	34	—	71	RIAA: Gold	Bigger and Deffer
"I Need Love"	1987	14	—	1	*	—	6	3	—	6	8		Bigger and Deffer
"Go Cut Creator Go"	1987	—	—	—	*	—	—	76	—	—	66		Bigger and Deffer
"Going Back to Cali"	1988	31	— (Note: "Going Back to Cali" did not enter the Dance Club Songs, but peaked at number 19 on the Dance Singles Sales.)	12	*	—	—	—	—	—	37	RIAA: Platinum	Less Than Zero Soundtrack and Walking with a Panther
"I'm That Type of Guy"	1989	15	9	7	1	148	—	—	11	—	43	RIAA: Gold	Walking with a Panther
"Big Ole Butt"	1989	—	—	57	13	—	—	—	—	—	—		Walking with a Panther
"One Shot at Love"	1989	—	—	68	—	—	—	—	—	—	—		Walking with a Panther
"Clap Your Hands"	1989	—	—	—	—	—	—	—	—	—	—		Walking with a Panther
"Change Your Ways"	1989	—	—	—	—	—	—	—	—	—	—		Walking with a Panther
"Jingling Baby"	1990	—	—	32	6	—	—	—	—	—	—		Walking with a Panther
"To da Break of Dawn"	1990	—	—	—	17	—	—	—	—	—	—		House Party Soundtrack and Mama Said Knock You Out
"The Boomin' System"	1990	48	13	6	1	—	—	—	—	—	83		Mama Said Knock You Out
"Around the Way Girl"	1990	9	7	5	1	45	—	—	27	—	41	RIAA: Platinum	Mama Said Knock You Out
"Mama Said Knock You Out"	1991	17	7	12	1	37	—	—	47	—	41	RIAA: Platinum; BPI: Silver	Mama Said Knock You Out
"Around the Way Girl" (remix)	1991	—	—	—	—	—	—	—	—	—	36		Mama Said Knock You Out
"6 Minutes of Pleasure"	1991	95	— (Note: "6 Minutes of Pleasure" did not enter the Dance Club Songs, but peaked at number 37 on the Dance Singles Sales.)	26	7	93	—	—	—	—	—		Mama Said Knock You Out
"Who's Afraid of the Big Bad Wolf?"	1991	—	—	—	—	100	—	—	—	—	—		Simply Mad About the Mouse
"Strictly Business"	1991	—	—	—	—	—	—	—	—	—	—		Strictly Business Soundtrack
"How I'm Comin'"	1993	57	— (Note: "How I'm Comin'" did not enter the Dance Club Songs, but peaked at number 48 on the Dance Singles Sales.)	28	1	101	—	—	16	—	37		14 Shots to the Dome
"Back Seat (of My Jeep)"	1993	42	— (Note: "Pink Cookies In a Plastic Bag Getting Crushed by Buildings/Back Seat (of My Jeep)" did not enter the Dance Club Songs, but peaked at number 25 on the Dance Singles Sales.)	24	2	—	—	—	—	—	—		14 Shots to the Dome
"Pink Cookies In a Plastic Bag Getting Crushed by Buildings"	1993	— (Note: "Pink Cookies In a Plastic Bag Getting Crushed by Buildings" did not enter the Billboard Hot 100, but peaked at number one on the Bubbling Under Hot 100.)	—	24	2	—	—	—	—	—	—		14 Shots to the Dome
"Stand by Your Man"	1993	— (Note: "Stand by Your Man" did not enter the Billboard Hot 100, but peaked at number 16 on the Bubbling Under Hot 100.)	— (Note: "Stand by Your Man" did not enter the Dance Club Songs, but peaked at number 48 on the Dance Singles Sales.)	67	24	—	—	—	—	—	—		14 Shots to the Dome
"Hey Lover" (featuring Boyz II Men)	1995	3	— (Note: "Hey Lover" did not enter the Dance Club Songs, but peaked at number 3 on the Dance Singles Sales.)	3	1	11	34	12	5	—	17	RIAA: Platinum	Mr. Smith
"Doin' It" (featuring LeShaun)	1996	9	— (Note: "Doin' It" did not enter the Dance Club Songs, but peaked at number 3 on the Dance Singles Sales.)	7	2	65	36	10	16	47	15	RIAA: Platinum	Mr. Smith
"Loungin" (featuring Total)	1996	3	— (Note: "Loungin" did not enter the Dance Club Songs, but peaked at number 3 on the Dance Singles Sales.)	3	1	56	32	11	11	—	7	RIAA: Platinum	Mr. Smith
"Ain't Nobody"	1996	46	— (Note: "Ain't Nobody" did not enter the Dance Club Songs, but peaked at number 9 on the Dance Singles Sales.)	27	23	60	33	30	30	—	1	BPI: Silver	Beavis and Butt-Head Do America Soundtrack
"Hit 'Em High (The Monstars' Anthem)" (with B-Real, Busta Rhymes, Coolio and Method Man)	1997	—	—	—	—	—	14	5	17	11	8		Space Jam Soundtrack
"Phenomenon"	1997	55	— (Note: "Phenomenon" did not enter the Dance Club Songs, but peaked at number 7 on the Dance Singles Sales.)	16	14	29	43	21	11	22	9		Phenomenon
"4, 3, 2, 1" (featuring Method Man, Redman, Canibus, Master P and DMX)	1997	75	— (Note: "4, 3, 2, 1" did not enter the Dance Club Songs, but peaked at number 5 on the Dance Singles Sales.)	24	10	—	—	—	—	—	—		Phenomenon
"Father"	1998	18	—	12	1	—	—	—	27	—	10		Phenomenon
"Hot, Hot, Hot"	1998	—	—	—	—	83	48	74	13	—	—		Phenomenon
"Candy" (featuring Ralph Tresvant and Ricky Bell)	1998	—	—	— (Note: "Candy" did not enter the Hot R&B/Hip-Hop Songs chart, but peaked at number 62 on the R&B/Hip-Hop Airplay component chart.)	—	—	—	—	—	—	—		Phenomenon
"Zoom" (with Dr. Dre)	1998	—	—	—	—	—	44	67	—	45	15		Bulworth Soundtrack
"Deepest Bluest"	1999	—	—	—	—	—	77	—	—	—	—		Deep Blue Sea Soundtrack
"Imagine That" (featuring LeShaun)	2000	98	—	46	16	—	—	—	—	90	—		G.O.A.T.
"Take It Off"	2000	—	—	— (Note: "Take It Off" did not enter the Hot R&B/Hip-Hop Songs chart, but peaked at number 70 on the Hot R&B/Hip-Hop Singles Sales component chart.)	35	—	—	—	—	—	—		G.O.A.T.
"You and Me" (featuring Kelly Price)	2000	—	—	59	44	95	53	49	—	85	—		G.O.A.T.
"Shut 'Em Down"	2000	—	—	89	31	—	—	—	—	—	—		Any Given Sunday Soundtrack
"Fatty Girl" (with Ludacris and Keith Murray)	2001	87	—	32	6	—	—	—	—	—	—		The Good Life
"Luv U Better"	2002	4	—	1	2	—	74	—	—	42	7		10
"Paradise" (featuring Amerie)	2003	36	—	14	10	28	—	—	46	70	18		10
"Amazin'" (featuring Kandice Love)	2003	—	—	73	—	—	—	—	—	—	—		10
"Headsprung"	2004	16	—	7	4	—	80	—	—	20	25	RIAA: Platinum	The DEFinition
"Hush" (featuring 7 Aurelius)	2005	26	—	14	11	—	—	—	—	—	3		The DEFinition
"It's LL and Santana" (featuring Juelz Santana)	2006	—	—	— (Note: "It's LL and Santana" did not enter the Hot R&B/Hip-Hop Songs chart, but peaked at number 44 on the Hot R&B/Hip-Hop Singles Sales component chart.)	—	—	—	—	—	—	—		Todd Smith
"Control Myself" (featuring Jennifer Lopez)	2006	4	14	28	9	17	25	19	7	—	2	RIAA: Gold; BPI: Silver	Todd Smith
"Freeze" (featuring Lyfe Jennings)	2006	—	—	65	—	—	—	—	—	—	—		Todd Smith
"Cry" (featuring Lil' Mo)	2008	—	—	119	—	—	—	—	—	—	—		Exit 13
"Baby" (featuring The-Dream)	2008	52	—	22	10	—	—	—	—	—	56		Exit 13
"NCIS: No Crew Is Superior"	2009	—	—	—	—	—	—	—	—	—	—		Non-album singles
"LLovely Day"	2010	—	—	—	—	—	—	—	—	—	—		Non-album singles
"No More" (featuring Ne-Yo)	2011	— (Note: "No More" did not enter the Billboard Hot 100, but peaked at number 24 on the Bubbling Under Hot 100.)	—	87	—	—	—	—	—	—	—		NCIS: Los Angeles Soundtrack
"Ratchet"	2012	—	—	—	—	—	—	—	—	—	—		Non-album singles
"Take It" (featuring Joe)	2012	—	—	—	—	—	—	—	—	—	—		Non-album singles
"Whaddup" (featuring Chuck D, Travis Barker, Tom Morello and DJ Z-Trip)	2013	—	—	107	—	—	—	—	—	—	—		Authentic
"We Came to Party" (featuring Snoop Dogg and Fatman Scoop)	2013	—	—	—	—	—	—	—	—	—	—		Authentic
"Live for You" (featuring Brad Paisley)	2013	—	—	—	—	—	—	—	—	—	—		Authentic
"Something About You (Love the World)" (featuring Charlie Wilson, Earth, Wind & Fire and Melody Thornton)	2013	—	—	—	—	—	—	—	—	—	—		Authentic
"Tell Tha World" (featuring Lil Leeky)	2014	—	—	—	—	—	—	—	—	—	—		Non-album singles
"I'm Nice" (featuring Murder Mook, Raekwon and Ron Browz)	2014	—	—	—	—	—	—	—	—	—	—		Non-album singles
"The Hustler" (featuring Mavado)	2014	—	—	—	—	—	—	—	—	—	—		Non-album singles
"You Already" (featuring Troy Ave)	2016	—	—	—	—	—	—	—	—	—	—		Non-album singles
"Saturday Night Special" (featuring Rick Ross and Fat Joe)	2024	—	—	—	—	—	—	—	—	—	—		The FORCE
"Passion"	2024	—	—	—	—	—	—	—	—	—	—		The FORCE
"Proclivities" (featuring Saweetie)	2024	—	—	—	—	—	—	—	—	—	—		The FORCE
"Murdergram Deux" (featuring Eminem)	2024	—	—	45	—	—	—	—	— (Note: "Murdergram Deux" did not enter the NZ Top 40 Singles Chart, but peaked at number 25 on the NZ Hot Singles Chart.)	—	— (Note: "Murdergram Deux" did not enter the UK Singles Chart Top 100, but debuted and peaked at number 37 on the UK Singles Downloads Chart.)		The FORCE
"—" denotes a recording that did not chart or was not released in that territory. "x" denotes a chart that did not exist at the time.

=== As featured artist ===
Year	Single	Charts										Certifications	Album
Year	Single	US	US R&B	US Rap	AUS	CAN	GER	IRE	NED	NZ	UK	Certifications	Album
1991	"Rampage" (EPMD featuring LL Cool J)	—	30	2	—	—	—	—	—	—	—		Business as Usual
1991	"Why Me Baby?" (Keith Sweat featuring LL Cool J)	44	2	4	—	—	—	—	—	—	—		Keep It Comin'
1994	"Flava in Ya Ear (Remix)" (Craig Mack featuring the Notorious B.I.G., Rampage, LL Cool J and Busta Rhymes)	—	—	—	—	—	—	—	—	—	—		Bad Boy's 10th Anniversary... The Hits
1996	"This Is for the Lover in You" (Babyface featuring LL Cool J)	6	2	—	50	10	—	—	19	12	12	RIAA: Platinum	The Day
1998	"Incredible" (Keith Murray featuring LL Cool J)	—	70	36	—	—	—	—	—	—	52		It's a Beautiful Thing
1999	"Say What" (Violator featuring LL Cool J)	—	—	—	—	—	—	—	—	—	—		Violator: The Album and Deep Blue Sea soundtrack
2001	"Put Your Hands Up" (Violator featuring LL Cool J)	—	—	—	—	—	—	—	—	—	—		Violator: The Album, V2.0
2002	"All I Have" (Jennifer Lopez featuring LL Cool J)	1	4	—	2	—	19	7	5	1	2	ARIA: 2× Platinum; RIANZ: Gold; BPI: Gold	This Is Me... Then / 10
2010	"We Are the World 25 for Haiti" (As part of Artists for Haiti)	2	—	—	18	7	—	9	—	8	50	MC: 3× Platinum	Charity single
2013	"Accidental Racist" (Brad Paisley featuring LL Cool J)	77	—	—	—	—	—	—	—	—	—		Wheelhouse
"—" denotes a recording that did not chart or was not released in that territory.

== Guest appearances ==
- Action Bronson - "Strictly 4 My Jeeps (remix)" (w/ Lloyd Banks) (Album: n/a)
- Alicia Keys - "Teenage Love Affair (Remix) (Album: As I Am)
- Allure - "No Question" (Album: Allure)
- Allure - "Enjoy Yourself (Remix)" (Album: n/a)
- Babyface - "This Is For The Lover In You" (Album: "The Day")
- Brandy - "Sittin Up In My Room (remix)" (Album: n/a)
- Carl Thomas - "I Wish (DJ Clue remix)" (w/Prodigy & Shyne) (Album: n/a)
- Carl Thomas - "She Is" (Album: Let's Talk About It)
- DJ Kay Slay - "The Truth" (Album: The Streetsweeper Vol. 2: The Pain From The Game)
- Erick Sermon - "Do-Re-Mi" (w/Scarface) (Album: Music)
- FunkMaster Flex & Big Kap - "Ill Bomb" (Album: The Tunnel)
- Ice Cube - "Before Hip-Hop (Premix)" (w/Chuck D) (Album: N/A)
- Joe Budden - "Focus (Remix)" (w/Dutchess) (Album: N/A)
- Kia Shine - "Kripsy (Remix)" (w/Swizz Beatz, Young Buck, Slim Thug, E-40, Remy Ma & Jim Jones) (Album: Due Season)
- Kid Ink - "Main Chick (Remix)" (w/Chris Brown & Tyga) (Album: N/A)
- LSG - "Curious" (w/Busta Rhymes & MC Lyte) (Album: Levert-Sweat-Gill)
- Marley Marl - "I Be Getting' Busy" (Album: In Control Vol.II - For Your Steering Pleasure)
- Marley Marl - "Haters" (Album: Hip Hop Dictionary)
- Mary J. Blige - "Mary Jane (remix)" (Album: Flava)
- Mary Mary - "We're Gonna Make It" (Album: Madea's Family Reunion Soundtrack)
- Method Man & Redman - 4 Seasons (w/Ja Rule) (Album: Blackout!)
- Michael Jackson - "Serious Effect" (Album: Dangerous (Outtake))
- Montell Jordan - "Get It on Tonight (remix)" (Album: n/a)
- Mashonda - "Crazy Girl" (Album: Rush Hour 2 (soundtrack))
- Nelly - "Hold Up" (w/T.I.) (Album: Brass Knuckles)
- Shanice - "I Got This" (Album: n/a)
- Swizz Beatz - "Ghetto Love" (w/Mashonda) (Album: Presents G.H.E.T.T.O. Stories)
- Taral - "How Do I Get Over You (Remix)" (Album: n/a)
- Tori Kelly - "California Lovers" (Album: Unbreakable Smile)
- Various - " I Make My Own Rules" (w/Red Hot Chili Peppers) (Album: Private Parts: The Album)
- Various - "Dear Mallika" (Album "The Rapsody Overture, Hip Hop Meets Classic")
- Various - "Heal Yourself" (w/Freddie Foxxx, Run DMC, KRS-One, Big Daddy Kane, and others) (Album: H.E.A.L.: Civilization Vs. Technology)
- Various - "What's Going On (Neptunes Mix)" (w/Queen Latifah, Da Brat, Mobb Deep, Royce Da 5'9", and others) (Album: What's Going On)
- Wayne Wonder - "No Letting Go (remix)" (w/Dutchess) (Album: n/a)

== Music videos ==
Year	Title	Director
1987	"I'm Bad"	Rolando Hudson
1987	"I Need Love"	Rolando Hudson
1988	"Going Back to Cali"	Rick Menello
1989	"I'm That Type of Guy"	Scott Kalvert
1989	"Big Ole Butt"	Paris Barclay
1989	"Jingling Baby"	Paris Barclay
1989	"One Shot at Love"	Paris Barclay
1990	"Around the Way Girl"	
1990	"Rampage" (EPMD feat. LL)	
1990	"Mama Said Knock You Out"	Paris Barclay
1990	"The Boomin' System"	
1991	"6 Minutes of Pleasure"	Marcus Nispel
1991	"Heal Yourself" (with Big Daddy Kane, Freddie Foxxx, Harmony, KRS-One, Kid Capri, MC Lyte, Queen Latifah & Run DMC)	
1991	"Strictly Business"	Paris Barclay
1991	"Why Me Baby" (Keith Sweat feat. LL)	
1991	"Who's Afraid of the Big Bad Wolf?"	Scott Garen
1993	"Stand By Your Man"	
1993	"Back Seat"	
1993	"Pink Cookies"	
1994	"Flava in Ya Ear" (Remix) (Craig Mack feat. LL, Notorious B.I.G., Rampage & Busta Rhymes)	Hype Williams
1995	"Hey Lover"	Hype Williams
1995	"I Shot Ya' (remix)"	
1996	"Doin' It"	Hype Williams
1996	"Loungin' (remix)"	Hype Williams
1996	"Hit Em High (Monstars' Anthem) [with B-Real, Coolio, Method Man and Busta Rhymes]	Hype Williams
1996	"This Is for the Lover in You" (Babyface feat. LL)	
1996	"Ain't Nobody"	Michael Martin
1996	"Summer Love"	
1997	"Phenomenon"	Paul Hunter
1997	"4, 3, 2, 1"	Diane Martel
1997	"Father"	Samuel Bayer
1997	"Dear Mallika"	
1998	"Curious" (LSG feat. LL, Busta Rhymes, MC Lyte)	
1998	"Hot, Hot, Hot"	Paul Hunter
1998	"Zoom" (with Dr. Dre)	
1999	"Incredible" (Keith Murray feat. LL)	
1999	"Deepest Bluest"	Renny Harlin
2000	"Shut 'em Down"	David Meyers
2000	"Imagine That"	Hype Williams
2000	"You And Me"	
2001	"Blink Blink (Spax feat. LL)	
2001	"Fatty Girl" (with Keith Murray & Ludacris)	
2002	"Luv U Better"	Benny Boom
2002	"Paradise"	Benny Boom
2002	"All I Have" (with Jennifer Lopez)	David Meyers
2004	"Headsprung"	Fat Cats
2004	"Hush"	Jessy Terrero
2004	"She Is" (Carl Thomas feat. LL)	Erik White
2006	"Control Myself (With Jennifer Lopez)"	Hype Williams
2006	"Freeze"	Hype Williams
2008	"Rocking With The G.O.A.T."	
2008	"Baby"	
2008	"Feel My Heart Beat (Yahoo Live Sets)"	
2010	"We Are the World 25 for Haiti"	Paul Haggis
2012	"Take It"	Paris Barclay
2014	"The Hustler"	Benny Boom
2014	"I'm Nice"	Benny Boom
