= All World 2 =

Greatest hits album by LL Cool J
- Released: December 8, 2009
- Recorded: 1984–2008
- Genre: East Coast hip hop; golden age hip hop
- Length: 73:52
- Label: Def Jam
- Producer: LL Cool J (also exec.); 7 Aurelius; Amen-Ra; DJ Scratch; Dwayne Simon; Erick Sermon; Marley Marl; Rick Rubin; Sean Combs; The Neptunes; Timbaland; Toke & Pone; Tricky Stewart

LL Cool J chronology
Exit 13 (2008)	All World 2 (2009)	Authentic (2013)

All World 2 is the second greatest hits compilation from hip hop artist LL Cool J released on December 8, 2009, by Def Jam. Like the original All World compilation, it features tracks from his Def Jam debut Radio to his sixth studio album Mr. Smith, but also features tracks from his seventh studio album Phenomenon to his (at the time) most recent album Exit 13. No tracks from his eighth studio album G.O.A.T. appear on the compilation, despite the album being his only number one album to date.

== Reception ==
Professional ratings
Review scores
Source	Rating
AllMusic	3/5 stars

AllMusic's review derided the album for replicating too much material from All World: Greatest Hits while leaving out too much to be a decent entry point for LL Cool J's work, wryly declaring the release "an acceptable starting point if you don't feel the need to own classics like 'I Need a Beat,' 'I'm Bad,' 'Going Back to Cali,' 'The Boomin' System,' and 'Mama Said Knock You Out.'"

== Track listing ==
All World 2 track listing
No.	Title	Writer(s)	Producer(s)	Length
1.	"Rock the Bells" (from Radio)	Jame Todd Smith; Frederick Rubin	Rick Rubin	4:02
2.	"Dear Yvette" (from Radio)	Smith; Rubin	Rubin	4:08
3.	"I'm That Type of Guy" (from Walking with a Panther)	Smith; Dwayne Simon; Steven Ettinger	LL Cool J; Dwayne Simon	5:17
4.	"Big Ole Butt" (from Walking with a Panther)	Smith; Simon; Brian Latture	LL Cool J; Dwayne Simon	4:36
5.	"Pink Cookies in a Plastic Bag Getting Crushed by Buildings" (LP version; from 14 Shots to the Dome)	Smith; Marlon Williams	Marley Marl	4:17
6.	"Around the Way Girl" (from Mama Said Knock You Out)	Smith; Williams	Marley Marl	4:05
7.	"Jack the Ripper" (alternate mix from All World: Greatest Hits)	Smith; Rubin	Rick Rubin	4:48
8.	"To da Break of Dawn" (from Mama Said Knock You Out)	Smith; Williams	Marley Marl; LL Cool J	4:32
9.	"I Shot Ya" (remix; featuring Keith Murray, Fat Joe, Prodigy and Foxy Brown; from Mr. Smith)	Smith; Keith Murray; Albert Johnson; Joseph Cartagena; Inga Marchand; Jean-Claude Olivier; Samuel Barnes	Toke & Pone	5:04
10.	"Ill Bomb" (Funkmaster Flex and Big Kap featuring LL Cool J; from The Tunnel)	Smith; George Spivey; Allie Wrubel; Herb Magidson	DJ Scratch	4:01
11.	"Phenomenon" (from Phenomenon)	Smith; Ron Lawrence; Sean Combs; Bill Withers; Stanley McKenney	Sean Combs; Amen-Ra	4:05
12.	"4, 3, 2, 1" (video version featuring Method Man, Redman and DMX; from Phenomenon)	Smith; Clifford Smith; Reggie Noble; Earl Simmons; Erick Sermon	Erick Sermon	3:37
13.	"Luv U Better" (from 10)	Smith; Pharrell Williams; Chad Hugo	The Neptunes	4:40
14.	"Paradise" (featuring Amerie; from 10)	Smith; Olivier; Barnes; Amerie Mi Marie Rogers; Kenneth Burke; Allan Felder; Norma Jean Wright	Toke & Pone	4:35
15.	"Headsprung" (from The DEFinition)	Smith; Timothy Mosley	Timbaland	4:27
16.	"Hush" (from The DEFinition)	Smith; Seven Aurelius; Paul Graham; Cornelius Mims; Paul Bushnell	7 Aurelius	3:35
17.	"Baby" (featuring The-Dream; from Exit 13)	Smith; Terius Nash; Christopher Stewart	Tricky Stewart	4:03
Total length:				73:52
