= All World: Greatest Hits =

All World: The Greatest Hits

Greatest hits album by LL Cool J
- Released: November 5, 1996
- Recorded: 1984–1995
- Genres: East Coast hip-hop; golden age hip-hop
- Length: 1:13:25
- Label: Def Jam
- Producers: L.A. Posse; LL Cool J; Marley Marl; Quincy Jones III; Rashad Smith; Rick Rubin; Tone

LL Cool J chronology
Mr. Smith (1995)	All World: The Greatest Hits (1996)	Phenomenon (1997)

Professional ratings
Review scores
Source	Rating
AllMusic	5/5 stars
Robert Christgau	A
Entertainment Weekly	A

All World: The Greatest Hits is the first greatest hits album by American rapper LL Cool J. The compilation was released on November 5, 1996, via Def Jam Recordings, and cover the artist's career from his 1985 debut album Radio to his 1995 sixth studio album Mr. Smith. The album was produced by Rick Rubin, Marley Marl, L.A. Posse, Rashad Smith, Quincy Jones III, Tone, and LL Cool J, with Brian Latture and Steve Ett serving as assistant producers on three out of sixteen tracks. It features guest appearances from Boyz II Men and Total.

On January 7, 1997, it was certified Gold by the Recording Industry Association of America and on August 28, 2001 it received Platinum status for selling 1,000,000 units in the United States alone.

== Track listing ==
No.	Title	Writer(s)	Producer(s)	Length
1.	"I Can't Live Without My Radio" (from Radio)	James Todd Smith; Frederick Jay Rubin	Rick Rubin	5:30
2.	"Rock the Bells" (from Radio)	J.T. Smith; Rubin	Rick Rubin	4:01
3.	"I'm Bad" (from Bigger and Deffer)	J.T. Smith; Dwayne Simon; Darryl Pierce; Bobby Ervin	L.A. Posse; LL Cool J	4:40
4.	"I Need Love" (from Bigger and Deffer)	J.T. Smith; Simon; Pierce; Ervin; Steven Ettinger	L.A. Posse; LL Cool J	5:22
5.	"Going Back to Cali" (from Walking with a Panther)	J.T. Smith; Rubin	Rick Rubin	4:09
6.	"Jack the Ripper" (b-Side of "Going Back To Cali")	J.T. Smith; Rubin	LL Cool J; Rick Rubin^{[ad]}; Muffla^{[c]}; Brian Latture^{[as]}; Steve Ett^{[as]}	4:48
7.	"Jingling Baby (Remixed But Still Jingling)" (from Mama Said Knock You Out)	J.T. Smith; Simon; Brian Latture; Dennis Coffey	LL Cool J; Muffla^{[c]}; Brian Latture^{[as]}; Steve Ett^{[as]}	4:54
8.	"Big Ole Butt" (from Walking with a Panther)	J.T. Smith; Simon	LL Cool J; Muffla^{[c]}; Brian Latture^{[as]}; Steve Ett^{[as]}	4:37
9.	"The Boomin' System" (from Mama Said Knock You Out)	J.T. Smith; Marlon Williams	Marley Marl; LL Cool J^{[c]}	3:40
10.	"Around the Way Girl" (from Mama Said Knock You Out)	J.T. Smith; Williams; Rick James	Marley Marl; LL Cool J^{[c]}	4:02
11.	"Mama Said Knock You Out" (from the album of the same name)	J.T. Smith; Williams; James McCants; LeRoy McCants	Marley Marl; LL Cool J^{[c]}; DJ Bobcat^{[as]}	4:48
12.	"Back Seat (of My Jeep)" (from 14 Shots to the Dome)	J.T. Smith; Quincy Jones III	QDIII	4:31
13.	"I Need a Beat" (from Radio)	J.T. Smith; Rubin	Rick Rubin	4:59
14.	"Doin It" (from Mr. Smith)	J.T. Smith; Rashad Smith; Grace Mendoza	Rashad Smith	4:54
15.	"Loungin (Who Do Ya Luv)" (featuring Total; from Mr. Smith)	J.T. Smith; R. Smith; Bernard Wright; Lenny White	Rashad Smith; Tone^{[r]}	3:46
16.	"Hey Lover" (featuring Boyz II Men; from Mr. Smith)	J.T. Smith; Rod Temperton	Tone	4:44
Total length:				1:13:25

UK bonus track
No.	Title	Writer(s)	Producer(s)	Length
17.	"Ain't Nobody" (from Beavis and Butt-Head Do America: Original Motion Picture Soundtrack)	J.T. Smith; Hawk Wolinski	Rashad Smith	4:37

Notes

- ^{^[ad]} signifies an additional producer.
- ^{^[as]} signifies an assistant producer.
- ^{^[c]} signifies a co-producer.
- ^{^[r]} signifies a remixer.
- "Jack The Ripper" on this collection is a different mix, with most of DJ Cut Creator's turntable techniques & breakdowns omitted-the original version can be found on the b-side of the "Going Back to Cali" single, or on the Def Jam 10th Anniversary box set.

Sample credits

- Track 11 samples "Gangster Boogie" written by James McCants and LeRoy McCants.
- Track 14 samples "My Jamaican Guy" written and performed by Grace Jones.
- Track 15 samples "Who Do You Love?" written by Bernard Wright and Lenny White.

== Charts ==
=== Weekly charts ===
Chart (1996–97)	Peak position
Dutch Albums (Album Top 100)	31
German Albums (Offizielle Top 100)	46
Swedish Albums (Sverigetopplistan)	32
Swiss Albums (Schweizer Hitparade)	45
UK Albums (Official Charts)	23
US Billboard 200	29
US Top R&B/Hip-Hop Albums (Billboard)	21

=== Year-end charts ===
Chart (1997)	Position
Dutch Albums (Album Top 100)	89
US Billboard 200	166

== Certifications ==
Region	Certification	Certified units/sales
Canada (Music Canada)	Gold	50,000^{^}
United Kingdom (BPI)	Gold	100,000^{^}
United States (RIAA)	Platinum	1,000,000^{^}
^{^} Shipments figures based on certification alone.
