= Kamikaze (Eminem song) =

Song by Eminem

from the album Kamikaze
- Released: August 31, 2018
- Genre: Hip hop
- Length: 3:36
- Label: Shady; Aftermath; Interscope
- Songwriters: Marshall Mathers; Bobby Ervin; Dwayne Simon; James Smith; Timothy Suby
- Producers: Timothy Suby; Eminem

"Kamikaze" is a song by American rapper Eminem from his album of the same name (2018). The song was written and produced by Eminem and Tim Suby, with more writing credits going to DJ Bobcat, Muffla, and LL Cool J for the sampling of the latter's "I'm Bad".

== Release ==
The song was released on August 31, 2018, with the rest of Kamikaze.

When the album was first released, the title of this and "Fall" were misplaced, but this mistake was quickly fixed.

== Personnel ==
- Eminem – lead vocals, additional production
- Tim Suby – production

== Charts ==
Chart (2018)	Peak position
Australia (ARIA)	13
Austria (Ö3 Austria Top 40)	31
Belgium (Ultratip Bubbling Under Flanders)	13
Canada Hot 100 (Billboard)	9
Czech Republic Singles Digital (ČNS IFPI)	11
France (SNEP)	94
Germany (GfK)	53
Greece Digital International Singles (IFPI)	9
Hungary (Single Top 40)	19
Hungary (Stream Top 40)	8
Italy (FIMI)	41
Netherlands (Single Top 100)	55
New Zealand (Recorded Music NZ)	34
Norway (VG-lista)	19
Portugal (AFP)	35
Slovakia Singles Digital (ČNS IFPI)	5
Sweden (Sverigetopplistan)	43
US Billboard Hot 100	16
US Hot R&B/Hip-Hop Songs (Billboard)	13

== Certifications ==
Region	Certification	Certified units/sales
Australia (ARIA)	Platinum	70,000^{‡}
Brazil (Pro-Música Brasil)	Gold	20,000^{‡}
New Zealand (RMNZ)	Gold	15,000^{‡}
United Kingdom (BPI)	Silver	200,000^{‡}
United States (RIAA)	Gold	500,000^{‡}
^{‡} Sales+streaming figures based on certification alone.
