= I'm That Type of Guy =

Single by LL Cool J

from the album Walking with a Panther
- B-side: "It Gets No Rougher"
- Released: May 24, 1989
- Genre: Golden age hip hop
- Length: (LP): 5:16; (Single): 3:23
- Label: Def Jam
- Songwriters: James Todd Smith; Dwayne Simon; Steve Ett
- Producers: Dwayne Simon; LL Cool J

LL Cool J singles chronology
"Going Back to Cali" (1988)	"I'm That Type of Guy" (1989)	"Big Ole Butt" (1989)

Music video
- "I'm That Type of Guy" on YouTube

"I'm That Type of Guy" is the second single released from LL Cool J's third album, Walking with a Panther. It was released in 1989 for Def Jam Recordings and was produced by Dwayne Simon and LL Cool J. The song samples "The March of the Winkies" from the 1939 film The Wizard of Oz, while its music video was directed by Scott Kalvert.

The song would prove to be the most successful single from the album, making it to #15 on the Billboard Hot 100 and #7 on the Hot R&B/Hip-Hop songs. Despite being one of LL Cool J's biggest early hits, the song was not included on his 1996 greatest hits album, All World: Greatest Hits; it was, however, included in that album's follow-up All World 2, released 13 years later.

== Critical reception ==
David Browne of Rolling Stone praised the song, calling it "a new boast classic", whose "pumping bass line and [sic] menacing sustained piano chord," complemented one of LL Cool J's "slyest vocals". However, Jesse Ducker, writing for Albumism, called the single "an interesting failure, but a failure nonetheless", noting that although the delivery "sound[ed] different than just about everything he’d released up to that point", the song "never quite clicks, and his 'clever' lines often fall flat". Music critic and author Adrian Denning was more positive during his review of Walking with a Panther, stating that it "really gets your attention", although he criticized the song's length, calling it a "drag".

== Charts ==
Chart (1989)	Peak position
US Billboard Hot 100	15
US Hot R&B/Hip-Hop Songs (Billboard)	7
US Hot Rap Songs (Billboard)	1
US Dance Singles Sales (Billboard)	11
US Dance Club Songs (Billboard)	9

== Track listing ==
A-side

1. "I'm That Type of Guy" (J. T. Smith, D. Simon, S. Ett) - 5:16

B-side

1. "It Gets No Rougher" (J. T. Smith, H. Shocklee, K. Shocklee, E. Sadler) - 5:26
