= Murdergram Deux =

2024 single by LL Cool J featuring Eminem

Single by LL Cool J featuring Eminem

from the album The FORCE
- Released: August 30, 2024
- Recorded: 2023–2024
- Genre: Hip hop; hardcore hip-hop
- Length: 3:05
- Label: LL Cool J, Inc.; Def Jam; VMG
- Songwriters: James Todd Smith; Marshall Mathers III; Kamaal Fareed; Anthony King
- Producers: Q-Tip; Eminem (add.)

LL Cool J singles chronology
"Proclivities" (2024)	"Murdergram Deux" (2024)

Eminem singles chronology
"Somebody Save Me" (2024)	"Murdergram Deux" (2026)	"Welcome" (2024)

Music video
- "Murdergram Deux" on YouTube

"Murdergram Deux" is a song by American rapper LL Cool J, released on August 30, 2024, as the fourth single from his fourteenth studio album, The FORCE (2024). The sequel to his song "Murdergram" (1990), it features fellow American rapper Eminem. The song is produced by Q-Tip, with Eminem providing additional production. The song contains samples of "Donna's Dilemma" by Anthony King and "Going Back to Cali" by LL Cool J.

== Background ==
In an interview with Vulture, LL Cool J revealed the details about how the song was recorded:

Q-Tip played the beat. I actually watched him create a lot of it. It was absolutely amazing to me. Because of the choppiness in the tempo, I felt like Eminem would be perfect for it. We ended up going to L.A. to Dr. Dre's studio. We recorded together. I would go in and write my verse and record mine in the booth. He would go in and write his verse, record in the booth. We would never watch each other record, except for the very ending when we kind of went back and forth a little.

On June 17, 2024, the song leaked on social media. It was later taken down due to copyright issues. LL Cool J reacted with annoyance in an interview with Raymond T and said it was not the finished version.

== Composition ==
"Murdergram Deux" finds LL Cool J and Eminem rapping back-and-forth verses in rapid-paced delivery over skittering production. Eminem uses his trademark wordplay, and ends the song with references to his song "Crack a Bottle" and LL Cool J's "Going Back to Cali".

== Critical reception ==
The song was well-received by music critics. Sam Moore of HipHopDX commented the rappers "flex their lyrical skills" on the track. Zachary Horvath of HotNewHipHop remarked, "Both legends can really rap their a** [sic] off and their command of flow, as well as their lyrical abilities are front and center here. It feels like they were trying to outdo one another and if so, it's intense." Tom Breihan of Stereogum wrote, "LL and Eminem take turns displaying athletic rap feats over the nervously jittery beat." Flisadam Pointer of Uproxx wrote "Between their verses, LL Cool J and Eminem pulled out every sharp-witted trick in the hip-hop book. From swift cadence flips to multi-layered metaphors, 'Murdergram Deux,' is a rap masterclass."

== Music video ==
An official music video premiered on September 11, 2024. It was filmed in Detroit in late August and directed by JakeTheShooter. In the music video, LL Cool J recreates the cover of his album Bigger and Deffer (in the opening scene), as well as the cover of the story "Live From Death Row" from Vibe (1996) with Eminem, who later remakes the cover of the album Long Live the Kane by Big Daddy Kane. They recreate the black-and-white fishbowl scene from LL Cool J's "Going Back to Cali" video as well. The two also rap in front of walls covered in graffiti and speakers, including a colorful mural by New York artist Shirt King Phade.

== Charts ==
Chart performance for "Murdergram Deux"
Chart (2024)	Peak position
Canada Hot 100 (Billboard)	96
New Zealand Hot Singles (RMNZ)	25
UK Singles Downloads (Official Charts)	26
US Hot R&B/Hip-Hop Songs (Billboard)	45
US Rhythmic Airplay (Billboard)	39
