= The FORCE =

Studio album by LL Cool J
- Released: September 6, 2024
- Recorded: 2020–24
- Genre: Hip-hop
- Length: 43:33
- Labels: LL Cool J; Def Jam; VMG
- Producers: Q-Tip; J-S.A.N.D.; Kizzo

LL Cool J chronology
Authentic (2013)	The FORCE (2024)

Singles from The FORCE
- 1. "Saturday Night Special" Released: June 14, 2024; 2. "Passion" Released: July 12, 2024; 3. "Proclivities" Released: August 9, 2024; 4. "Murdergram Deux" Released: August 30, 2024

The FORCE (an acronym for Frequencies of Real Creative Energy) is the fourteenth studio album by American rapper and actor LL Cool J, released on September 6, 2024, by LL Cool J, Inc., Def Jam Recordings, and Virgin Music Group. It is LL Cool J's first official studio album in over eleven years since his 2013 predecessor, Authentic, released equally as his first under his vanity label, LL Cool J, Inc., and his first by Def Jam since 2008's Exit 13. It features guest appearances from Snoop Dogg, Fat Joe, Rick Ross, Sona Jobarteh, Saweetie, Busta Rhymes, Nas, Eminem, Mad Squablz, J-S.A.N.D., and Don Pablito.

The album is almost entirely produced by Q-Tip, who provides additional vocals on the bulk of the album, and had been involved in the development of the project since late 2020. The album also features additional production from the album's guest stars Eminem and Sona Jobarteh, with J-S.A.N.D. producing the album's final track alongside Kizzo.

== Background ==
The album was originally set for development in the summer of 2014 under the title GOAT 2, alluding to it being a sequel to LL Cool J's 2000 number-one album G.O.A.T. During 2015, he went idle from music to focus on acting (NCIS: Los Angeles) and hosting (Lip Sync Battle).

In March 2016, he announced his intentions to retire from recording music to focus more on his acting career. After negative feedback from fans, LL would later retract his announcement, and decided to scrap the original album and create a new one. In 2019, it was announced that LL Cool J and former labelmate DMX (who would later die in 2021) re-signed with Def Jam Recordings for their upcoming albums to be released. No follow-ups were heard of LL's album afterwards until March 2022, when he confirmed on Instagram that producer Q-Tip was assigned to produce a majority of the album.

On February 22, 2023, LL playfully reminded his social media followers that his album was scrapped because "it was too hot", before instating that it was "not yet worthy of a release" that year. That March, he and various artists embarked on a promotional tour leading up to the release of the album. On July 12, 2024, in celebration for the fortieth anniversary of the founding of his label, Def Jam, he announced the newly titled The FORCE, claiming that he "had to learn how to rap again".

On July 22, the album's track list was revealed.

== Singles ==
On June 15, 2024, the first projected single for the album, "Saturday Night Special", was released. It features Fat Joe and Rick Ross. According to LL, it was originally intended for a joint collaborative album he recorded with rapper 50 Cent; it would ultimately be cancelled, because it "didn't fit [his] style".

On July 12, 2024, the second single, "Passion", was released at the same time the album was announced.

"Proclivities", featuring Saweetie, was released as the third single on August 9, 2024.

"Murdergram Deux", featuring Eminem, was released as the fourth single on August 30, 2024.

== Critical reception ==
Professional ratings
Aggregate scores
Source	Rating
Metacritic	76/100
Review scores
Source	Rating
AllMusic	4/5 stars
And It Don't Stop	A−
The A.V. Club	B+
The Arts Desk	4/5 stars
Mojo	4/5 stars
musicOMH	3.5/5 stars
RapReviews	8/10
Rolling Stone	3/5 stars
Slant Magazine	3.5/5 stars
Tom Hull – on the Web	A−

The FORCE received generally favorable reviews from music critics. At Metacritic, which assigns a normalized rating out of 100 to reviews from mainstream critics, the album received an average score of 76, based on eight reviews.

Andy Cowan of Mojo declared the album "a comeback", finding LL Cool J to be "at his sharpest" lyrically, while also praising the guest appearances. Ben Devlin of musicOMH stated, "with no concessions to the mainstream whatsoever, the rapper is perhaps more focused on raw lyricism than on any LL record since Radio", concluding that "If LL was aiming to re-establish himself as a living legend in the rap scene, The FORCE accomplishes this in spades as he sounds as fired up as ever". Joe Muggs of The Arts Desk opined that "LL is in fine voice and furious flow", and called Q-Tip's production "a reminder that old-school, sample-based hip-hop can be as heavyweight, as compelling, as mind-bending as anything post-trap youngsters can come up with". Rolling Stone's Miles Marshall Lewis wrote that "The FORCE is hardly LL's grown-up 4:44 album. He's the same Farmers Boulevard superhero he's always been and the album is better for it", also stating, "If LL has done nothing but craft his blackest album possible within the confines of pop-leaning hip-hop for oldsters, his mission is well accomplished". Writing for Slant Magazine, Paul Attard was more critical, saying that "LL can still spit circles around nearly anyone. But there's a surprisingly low ceiling to the music here beyond that, with some moments feeling rather thoughtless in their execution".

== Commercial performance ==
The Force debuted at number 50 on the US Billboard 200, including number 11 on the Top R&B/Hip-Hop Albums and number 9 on the Independent Albums charts selling 16,000 album-equivalent units.

== Track listing ==
All tracks produced by Q-Tip, except for "Black Code Suite", additionally produced by Sona Jobarteh, "Murdergram Deux", additionally produced by Eminem, and "The Vow", produced by J-S.A.N.D. and Kizzo.

The FORCE track listing
No.	Title	Writer(s)	Length
1.	"Spirit of Cyrus" (featuring Snoop Dogg)	James Todd Smith; Calvin Broadus; Kamaal Fareed; Simon Park	3:30
2.	"The Force"	J. Smith; Fareed; Michael Jackson	2:49
3.	"Saturday Night Special" (featuring Fat Joe and Rick Ross)	J. Smith; Joseph Cartagena; Fareed; Pye Hastings; William Roberts III	3:28
4.	"Black Code Suite" (featuring Sona Jobarteh)	J. Smith; Jon Eberson; Fareed; Sona Jobarteh	4:26
5.	"Passion"	J. Smith; Fareed; Herbie Hancock	2:29
6.	"Proclivities" (featuring Saweetie)	J. Smith; Carlos Coleman; Julius Darrington; Fareed; Gary Webb	3:39
7.	"Post Modern"	J. Smith; Fareed; R. L. Smith	2:09
8.	"30 Decembers"	J. Smith; Fareed; Pekka Rechardt	3:26
9.	"Runnit Back"	J. Smith; Fareed; Jonathan Lind; Maurice White	2:46
10.	"Huey in the Chair" (featuring Busta Rhymes)	J. Smith; Fareed; Michael Karoli; Jaki Liebezeit; Irmin Schmidt; Holger Schüring; Trevor Smith; Kenji Suzuki	2:24
11.	"Basquiat Energy"	J. Smith; Fareed; Alex Wiska	2:22
12.	"Praise Him" (featuring Nas)	J. Smith; Fareed; Oluko Imo; Nasir Jones	2:25
13.	"Murdergram Deux" (featuring Eminem)	J. Smith; Fareed; Anthony King; Marshall Mathers III	3:05
14.	"The Vow" (featuring Mad Squablz, J-S.A.N.D. and Don Pablito)	J. Smith; James Brown; Kashif Dove; Dahseim Henry; Betty Newsome; Jaleel Ross	4:35
Total length:			43:33

=== Notes ===
- "The Force" contains a sample of "Don't Stop 'Til You Get Enough", written and performed by Michael Jackson.
- "Saturday Night Special" contains a sample of "Bobbing Wide", written by Pye Hastings, as performed by Caravan.
- "Passion" contains a sample of "Sun Touch", written and performed by Herbie Hancock.
- "Proclivities" contains:
  - samples of "M.E.", written and performed by Gary Numan.
  - an interpolation of the remix of "Flava in Ya Ear", written by Craig Mack, Christopher Wallace, Roger McNair, James Smith, and Trevor Smith, as performed by Mack featuring the Notorious B.I.G., Rampage, LL Cool J, and Busta Rhymes,
    - which itself interpolates "Jingling Baby", written by Smith, Dwayne Simon, and Brian Latture, as performed by LL Cool J.

== Personnel ==
Musicians

- LL Cool J – vocals
- Q-Tip – programming (tracks 1–12), bass guitar (1, 2, 4–6, 8–10, 12), drums (1, 2, 9), keyboards (2, 3, 5–9), guitar (6, 7)
- Casey Benjamin – keyboards (track 2)
- Sona Jobarteh – vocals, background vocals, bass guitar, guitar (track 4)
- Eric Appapoulay – additional vocals (track 4)
- Mitsue Burnett – additional vocals (track 5)
- Blair Wells – guitar (tracks 7–10, 12)
- Luis Resto – keyboards (track 13)
- J-S.A.N.D. – programming (track 14)

Technical

- Q-Tip – production (tracks 1–13), engineering (all tracks); mixing (tracks 1–12, 14)
- J-S.A.N.D. – production (track 14)
- Kizzo – production (track 14)
- Sona Jobarteh – additional production, engineering (track 4)
- Eminem – additional production (track 13)
- Blair Wells – mixing (tracks 1–12), engineering (1–12, 14)
- Mike Strange – mixing, engineering (track 13)
- Manny Marroquin – mixing (track 14)
- Mike Bozzi – mastering (tracks 1–12, 14)
- Brian "Big Bass" Gardner – mastering (track 13)
- Tony Campana – engineering (track 13)
- Victor Luevanos – engineering (track 13)
- Jonathan Owens – engineering (track 14)
- Paul Street – engineering (track 14)
- Fermin Suero Jr. – vocal production, vocal engineering (track 6)
- Oliver Turiano – engineering assistance
- Anthony Vilchis – mixing assistance (track 14)
- Trey Station – mixing assistance (track 14)
- Zach Pereyra – mixing assistance (track 14)

== Charts ==
Chart performance for The FORCE
Chart (2024)	Peak position
Scottish Albums (Official Charts)	79
Swiss Albums (Schweizer Hitparade)	71
UK Album Downloads (Official Charts)	22
UK R&B Albums (Official Charts)	1
US Billboard 200	50
US Independent Albums (Billboard)	9
US Top R&B/Hip-Hop Albums (Billboard)	11
