= I Need Love =

1987 single by LL Cool J

Single by LL Cool J

from the album Bigger and Deffer
- B-side: "My Rhyme Ain't Done"
- Released: July 13, 1987
- Recorded: 1987
- Genre: Hip hop soul
- Length: 5:23
- Label: Def Jam; Columbia; CBS
- Songwriters: James Smith; L.A. Posse
- Producers: LL Cool J; L.A. Posse

LL Cool J singles chronology
"I'm Bad" (1987)	"I Need Love" (1987)	"Going Back to Cali" (1988)

Music video
- "I Need Love" on YouTube

"I Need Love" is the second single from LL Cool J's second album, Bigger and Deffer. The single reached number 1 on the Hot Black Singles and number 14 on the Billboard Hot 100 while becoming one of the first rap songs to enjoy mainstream popularity in the UK, rising to number 8 in the UK Singles Chart. The single won a Soul Train Music Award for Best Rap Single in 1988 Soul Train Music Awards. The song was listed as number 13 on About.com's Top 100 Rap Songs.

== Track listing ==
A-side

1. "I Need Love" – 5:23

B-side

1. "I Need Love" (edit) – 4:15
2. "My Rhyme Ain't Done" – 3:45

== Charts ==
=== Weekly charts ===
Weekly chart performance for "I Need Love"
Chart (1987)	Peak position
Austria (Ö3 Austria Top 40)	13
Belgium (Ultratop 50 Flanders)	6
Ireland (IRMA)	10
Netherlands (Dutch Top 40)	3
Netherlands (Single Top 100)	3
Switzerland (Schweizer Hitparade)	6
UK Singles (Official Charts)	8
US Billboard Hot 100	14
US Billboard Hot Black Singles	1
West Germany (GfK)	6

=== Year-end charts ===
1987 year-end chart performance for "I Need Love"
Chart (1987)	Position
Belgium (Ultratop Flanders)	63
Netherlands (Dutch Top 40)	33
Netherlands (Single Top 100)	29
UK Singles (OCC)	97
US Hot Crossover Singles (Billboard)	17

== Sampling ==
The music, both melody and beats, were lifted from an instrumental titled "Zoraida's Heartbeat" (1984) by the Brooklyn songwriter Jayson Dyall.
