= One Shot at Love =

Single by LL Cool J

from the album Walking with a Panther
- B-side: "Clap Your Hands"
- Released: October 31, 1989
- Genre: Golden age hip hop; R&B
- Length: 4:09
- Label: Def Jam
- Songwriter(s): James Todd Smith; Dwayne Simon; Steve Ett
- Producer(s): Dwayne Simon; LL Cool J

LL Cool J singles chronology
"Big Ole Butt" (1989)	"One Shot at Love" (1989)	"Jingling Baby" (1990)

"One Shot at Love" is the fourth single released from LL Cool J's third album, Walking with a Panther. It was released in 1989 for Def Jam Recordings and was produced by Dwayne Simon and LL Cool J. "One Shot at Love" was a commercial disappointment as it only peaked at #68 on the Hot R&B/Hip-Hop songs chart.

== Track listing ==
=== A-side ===
1. "One Shot at Love" (J.T. Smith, D.Simon, S. Ett) - 4:09

=== B-side ===
1. "Clap Your Hands" (J.T. Smith) - 3:37
