= Authentic (LL Cool J album) =

Studio album by LL Cool J
- Released: April 30, 2013
- Studios: Henson (Hollywood, California); Westlake (West Hollywood, California); Downtown Music, Fenix, House of Hits (New York City)
- Length: 47:52
- Labels: S-BRO; 429
- Producers: LL Cool J (also exec.); Jaylien; Marley Marl; Sound Z; Tricky Stewart; Trackmasters; Eddie Van Halen

LL Cool J chronology
All World 2 (2009)	Authentic (2013)	The FORCE (2024)

Singles from Authentic
- 1. "Whaddup" Released: February 11, 2013; 2. "We Came to Party" Released: March 18, 2013; 3. "Live for You" Released: April 16, 2013; 4. "Something About You (Love The World)" Released: August 24, 2013

Authentic is the thirteenth studio album by American hip hop recording artist LL Cool J. It was released on April 30, 2013, by S-BRO Music Group, 429 Records. The album was his first album since 2008's Exit 13 and his first to not be released on Def Jam. It features guest appearances from Fitz and the Tantrums, Eddie Van Halen, Snoop Dogg, Fatman Scoop, Seal, Charlie Wilson, Melody Thornton, Earth, Wind & Fire, Bootsy Collins, Travis Barker, Chuck D, Tom Morello, Z-Trip, Mickey Shiloh, Monica, and Brad Paisley.

== Background ==
By June 2012, LL Cool J had begun work on his thirteenth studio album. He stated, "I'm going to be doing a little bit of the album on the My Connect Studio, make sure that it is official." On January 20, 2013, he announced on his Twitter account that the album had been pushed back from its original February 12, 2013 release date. On February 8, 2013, it was announced the album title would be changed from Authentic Hip-Hop to Authentic with a new release date of May 7, 2013, and a new cover. On February 14, 2013, the album's release date was pushed up to April 30, 2013. On March 14, 2013, Eddie Van Halen posted a photo of himself with LL Cool J in front of a mix board. The photo was captioned with "Authentic 4.30.13", suggesting that Eddie would be involved in some way with the album release.

== Singles ==
The first single "Whaddup" was debuted during the live 2013 Grammy Awards telecast, which features Chuck D, Travis Barker, Tom Morello and Z-Trip. On March 18, 2013, the second single "We Came to Party" was released featuring Snoop Dogg and Fatman Scoop. On April 16, the third single "Live for You" featuring country music singer Brad Paisley was released.

== Critical response ==
Professional ratings
Aggregate scores
Source	Rating
Metacritic	46/100
Review scores
Source	Rating
AllMusic	2.5/5 stars
The Boston Globe	7/10
Robert Christgau	(3-star Honorable Mention)
HipHopDX	2.5/5 stars
Los Angeles Times	1/4 stars
New York Daily News	(mixed)
Rolling Stone	3/5 stars
Slant Magazine	3/5 stars
USA Today	2/4 stars

Authentic received generally mixed reviews from music critics. At Metacritic, which assigns a normalized rating out of 100 to reviews from mainstream critics, the album received an average score of 46, based on 9 reviews. David Jeffries of AllMusic said, "LL sounds rusty and a bit under-rehearsed as he belts out his iffy punch lines and motivational anthems, but he pours his heart into the pop numbers and sounds at home during the nostalgic throwbacks." Gerrick Kennedy of the Los Angeles Times said, "LL Cool J has completely lost touch with what launched him into superstardom: rapping. That startling disconnection is what bogs down his 13th album, Authentic.

Ted Scheinman of Slant Magazine said, "Older listeners will find a wistful pleasure in hearing what may be the most heartfelt effort of LL's career." Robert Christgau said, "Cooler as Captain Lifer than Mr. Goodbar, but surprisingly likable either way" Steve Jones of USA Today said, "He has an eclectic bunch of guests and while he's obviously not aiming at the teen market, there seems to be a conscious effort to expand the fan base. The result is a mixed bag of party anthems and the rap ballads he pioneered years ago." Christina Jaleru of The San Diego Union-Tribune praised the album, saying, "LL Cool J knows how to play well with others. On his 13th studio album, Authentic, he delivers an eclectic mix of songs with a variety of guest singers that elevate the material to a worthy listening experience. This is not a rap album, but more of a hip-pop/hip-rock one, hitting all the right notes from romantic to raucous to punk."

Jay Balfour of HipHopDX said, "Unfortunately, Authentic suffers the same fate as LL's other late-career missteps: too many features and a superficial brand of R&B bog down another release from one of rap's earliest superstars." Jody Rosen of Rolling Stone said, "On Authentic, LL's first LP not released by Def Jam, the guest list is a testament to open-mindedness and crossover ambitions. The beats are unfussy and direct; the choruses are built for radio." Ken Capobianco of The Boston Globe said, "Metal hip-hop is more compromise than authentic, but much of this disc sounds genuine."

== Commercial performance ==
In its first week of release the album debuted at number 23 on the Billboard 200 and sold 14,000 copies in the United States. In its second week the album sold 5,500 more copies. In its third week the album sold 3,400 more copies. In its fourth week the album sold 2,700 more copies bringing its total sales to 26,000.

== Track listing ==
Authentic track listing
No.	Title	Writer(s)	Producer(s)	Length
1.	"Bath Salt"	J.T. Smith; Jean Claude "Poke" Olivier; Samuel J "Tone" Barnes; Alexander "Spanador" Mosely	Trackmasters; Jaylien^{[a]}	4:12
2.	"Not Leaving You Tonight" (featuring Fitz & The Tantrums with Eddie Van Halen)	Smith; Jaylien; Alycia Bellamy	Jaylien	4:02
3.	"New Love" (featuring Charlie Wilson)	Smith; Olivier; Barnes; Aaron "Ace 21" Grimes; Theodore "Range" Bowen	Trackmasters; Jaylien^{[a]}	3:13
4.	"We Came to Party" (featuring Snoop Dogg and Fatman Scoop)	Smith; Calvin Broadus	Jaylien	4:15
5.	"Give Me Love" (featuring Seal)	Smith; Jaylien	Jaylien	4:23
6.	"Something About You (Love the World)" (featuring Charlie Wilson, Earth, Wind & Fire and Melody Thornton)	Smith; Olivier; Barnes; Russel "The Are" Gonzalez; Melody Sangreal	Trackmasters; Jaylien^{[a]}; LL Cool J^{[a]}	4:13
7.	"Bartender Please" (featuring Snoop Dogg, Bootsy Collins and Travis Barker)	Smith; Olivier; Barnes; Broadus; Bowen; Mosely	Trackmasters; LL Cool J^{[a]}	4:36
8.	"Whaddup" (featuring Chuck D, Travis Barker, Tom Morello and Z-Trip)	Smith; Barnes; Olivier; Keith Shocklee; Carlton Ridenhour; Mosely	Trackmasters; Z-Trip^{[a]}	4:05
9.	"Between the Sheetz" (featuring Mickey Shiloh)	Smith; Kenneth Coby; Christopher Stewart; Michaela Shiloh	SoundZ; Tricky Stewart^{[a]}	3:48
10.	"Closer" (featuring Monica)	Smith; Barnes; Olivier; Bowen; Mosely	Trackmasters; Jaylien^{[a]}	3:47
11.	"Live for You" (featuring Brad Paisley)	Smith; Jaylien	Jaylien	3:44
12.	"We're the Greatest" (featuring Eddie Van Halen and Travis Barker)	Smith; Barnes; Olivier; Gonzalez; Phillip "Taj" Jackson	LL Cool J; Van Halen; Trackmasters^{[a]}	4:05
Total length:				47:52

Target bonus tracks
No.	Title	Writer(s)	Producer(s)	Length
13.	"Waiting On You" (featuring Babyface and Noelle Scaggs)	Smith; Jaylien	Jaylien	3:59
14.	"Jump On It"	Smith; Barnes; Olivier; Mosely	Trackmasters	3:22
15.	"Take It" (featuring Joe)	Smith; Barnes; Olivier; Gonzalez; Bowen	Trackmasters	3:32
16.	"Remember Me" (featuring Alicia Myers)	Meyers; Smith	Marley Marl	4:17

Notes

- ^{^[a]} signifies co-producer(s)

Sample credits

- "Closer" contains samples of Guy's "I Like".
- "Whaddup" contains samples of Public Enemy's "Welcome to the Terrordome".
- "Take It" contains samples of The Jones Girls' "When I'm Gone".

== Personnel ==
- Cey Adams – creative director
- Travis Barker – featured artist
- Samuel J. Barnes – producer
- Janette Beckman – photography
- Matt Brownlie – assistant
- Bootsy Collins – featured artist
- Martin Cooke – engineer
- Chuck D – featured artist
- Josh Drucker – assistant
- Earth, Wind & Fire – featured artist
- Nicolas Essig – assistant
- Fatman Scoop – featured artist
- Doug Fenske – engineer, mixing
- Stu Fine – A&R
- Fitz & the Tantrums – featured artist
- Jason Goldstein – engineer
- Chris Holmes – engineer
- Jaylien – producer
- David Alan Kogut – art direction, package design
- Miguel Lara – assistant
- LL Cool J – liner notes, primary artist
- Jared Lynch – assistant
- Glen Marchese – engineer, mixing
- Monica – featured artist
- Tom Morello – featured artist
- Jean Claude "Poke" Olivier – producer
- Jeremiah Olvera – assistant
- Brad Paisley – featured artist
- Neal H. Pogue – mixing
- Herb Powers – mastering
- Richard Rich – assistant
- David Rodriguez – assistant
- Seal – featured artist
- Mickey Shiloh – featured artist
- James Todd Smith – executive producer, producer
- Snoop Dogg – featured artist
- Nancie Stern – sample clearance
- Kyle Stevens – assistant
- C. "Tricky" Stewart – engineer, producer
- Melody Thornton – featured artist
- Eddie Van Halen – featured artist, producer
- David Wild – transcription
- Charlie Wilson – featured artist
- Andrew Wuepper – mixing
- Sound Z – producer
- Z-Trip – featured artist, producer, scratching

== Charts ==
Weekly chart performance for Authentic
Chart (2013)	Peak position
Swiss Albums (Schweizer Hitparade)	57
US Billboard 200	23
US Top R&B/Hip-Hop Albums (Billboard)	7
US Independent Albums (Billboard)	4
