= Walking with a Panther =

Studio album by LL Cool J
- Released: June 9, 1989
- Recorded: 1987–1989
- Genre: Golden age hip hop
- Length: 76:45 (CD); 84:29 (cassette); 67:16 (LP)
- Labels: Def Jam; Columbia
- Producers: LL Cool J; Dwayne Simon; Rick Rubin

LL Cool J chronology
Bigger and Deffer (1987)	Walking with a Panther (1989)	Mama Said Knock You Out (1990)

Singles from Walking with a Panther
- 1. "Going Back to Cali" Released: January 25, 1988; 2. "I'm That Type of Guy" Released: May 24, 1989; 3. "Big Ole Butt" Released: July 7, 1989; 4. "One Shot at Love" Released: October 31, 1989; 5. "Jingling Baby" Released: January 8, 1990

Walking with a Panther is the third studio album by American hip hop recording artist LL Cool J, released June 9, 1989, on Def Jam Recordings.

== Background ==
While his previous album Bigger and Deffer (1987) was produced by L.A. Posse, Dwayne Simon was the only member left of the group willing to work on Walking with a Panther, as other members, such as Bobby "Bobcat" Erving, wanted a higher pay after realizing how much of a success the previous album had become. Def Jam, however, refused to change the contract, which caused the L.A. Posse to leave. Walking with a Panther was primarily produced by LL Cool J and Dwayne Simon, with additional production from Rick Rubin and Public Enemy's production team, the Bomb Squad.

== Reception ==
Professional ratings
Review scores
Source	Rating
AllMusic	4/5 stars
The Encyclopedia of Popular Music	4/5 stars
Q	4/5 stars
Rolling Stone	3/5 stars
The Village Voice	A−

Walking with a Panther was a commercial success, peaking at number six on the Billboard 200 and number one on the Top R&B/Hip-Hop Albums chart, where it spent four weeks. The album contained the singles "Going Back to Cali", "I'm That Type of Guy", "Jingling Baby", "Big Ole Butt" and "One Shot at Love", which also achieved chart success. Walking with a Panther, however, was met with a mixed response from the hip-hop community at the time of its release, which was un-favorable of several of the album's love ballads. Despite this, Walking With a Panther was well received by music critics. The album was certified platinum by the Recording Industry Association of America (RIAA).

== Track listing ==
All tracks produced by LL Cool J & Dwayne Simon except where noted.

CD & Vinyl
No.	Title	Writer(s)	Producer(s)	Length
1.	"Droppin' Em"	Dwayne Simon, J.T. Smith		4:22
2.	"Smokin', Dopin'"	Simon, Smith		3:31
3.	"Fast Peg"	Smith, Bryan Philpot	Co-produced by DJ Cut Creator	1:38
4.	"Clap Your Hands"	Smith		5:07
5.	"Nitro"	Smith, Eric Sadler, Hank Shocklee	Co-produced by The Bomb Squad	4:43
6.	"You're My Heart"	Simon, Smith		4:42
7.	"I'm That Type of Guy"	Simon, Smith, Steve Ett		5:16
8.	"Why Do You Think They Call It Dope?"	Brian Latture, Simon, Smith		3:49
9.	"Going Back to Cali"	Smith, Rick Rubin	Produced by Rick Rubin	4:09
10.	"It Gets No Rougher"	Smith, Sadler, H. Shocklee, Keith Shocklee	Co-produced by The Bomb Squad	5:16
11.	"Big Ole Butt"	Latture, Simon, Smith		4:34
12.	"One Shot at Love"	Simon, Smith, Ett		4:18
13.	"1-900 LL Cool J"	Simon, Smith		3:01
14.	"Two Different Worlds" (featuring Cydne Monet)	Simon, Smith, Ett		5:19
15.	"Jealous"	Latture, Simon, Smith		3:54
16.	"Jingling Baby"	Latture, Simon, Smith		4:15
17.	"Def Jam in the Motherland"	Latture, Simon, Smith, Ett		4:35
18.	"Change Your Ways"	Simon, Smith, Ett		3:20

The cassette release had a slightly different track listing and two extra songs.

Cassette
No.	Title	Writer(s)	Producer(s)	Length
1.	"Droppin' Em"	Dwayne Simon, J.T. Smith		4:22
2.	"Smokin', Dopin'"	Simon, Smith		3:31
3.	"Fast Peg"	Smith, Bryan Philpot	Co-produced by DJ Cut Creator	1:38
4.	"Clap Your Hands"	Smith		5:07
5.	"Nitro"	Smith, Eric Sadler, Hank Shocklee	Co-produced by The Bomb Squad	4:43
6.	"You're My Heart"	Simon, Smith		4:42
7.	"I'm That Type of Guy"	Simon, Smith, Steve Ett		5:16
8.	"Why Do You Think They Call It Dope?"	Brian Latture, Simon, Smith		3:49
9.	"Going Back to Cali"	Smith, Rick Rubin	Produced by Rick Rubin	4:09
10.	"Crime Stories" (cassette bonus track)	Latture, Simon, Smith, Ett		3:10
11.	"It Gets No Rougher"	Smith, Sadler, H. Shocklee, Keith Shocklee	Co-produced by The Bomb Squad	5:16
12.	"Big Ole Butt"	Latture, Simon, Smith		4:34
13.	"One Shot at Love"	Simon, Smith, Ett		4:18
14.	"1-900 LL Cool J"	Simon, Smith		3:01
15.	"Two Different Worlds" (featuring Cydne Monet)	Simon, Smith, Ett		5:19
16.	"Jealous"	Latture, Simon, Smith		3:54
17.	"Jingling Baby"	Latture, Simon, Smith		4:15
18.	"Def Jam in the Motherland"	Latture, Simon, Smith, Ett		4:35
19.	"Change Your Ways"	Simon, Smith, Ett		3:20
20.	"Jack The Ripper" (cassette bonus track)	Smith, Rubin	Produced by Rick Rubin	4:52

The vinyl version omits tracks 9, 10, 19 & 20.

== Charts ==
=== Weekly charts ===
Weekly chart performance for Walking with a Panther
Chart (1989)	Peak position
Dutch Albums (Album Top 100)	63
New Zealand Albums (RMNZ)	48
UK Albums (Official Charts)	43
US Billboard 200	6
US Top R&B/Hip-Hop Albums (Billboard)	1

=== Year-end charts ===
Year-end chart performance for Walking with a Panther
Chart (1989)	Position
US Billboard 200	61
US Top R&B/Hip-Hop Albums (Billboard)	30

== Certifications ==
Certifications for Walking with a Panther
Region	Certification	Certified units/sales
United States (RIAA)	Platinum	1,000,000^{^}
^{^} Shipments figures based on certification alone.

== See also ==
- List of number-one R&B albums of 1989 (U.S.)

== Bibliography ==
- Larkin, Colin, ed. (2002). Encyclopedia of Popular Music (4th ed.). Muze UK. ISBN 1-85227-923-0.
