= Big Ole Butt =

1989 single by LL Cool J

Single by LL Cool J

from the album Walking with a Panther
- B-side: "One Shot at Love"
- Released: July 7, 1989
- Genre: Golden age hip hop
- Length: 4:34
- Label: Def Jam
- Songwriter(s): James Todd Smith; Dwayne Simon; Brian Latture
- Producer(s): Dwayne Simon; LL Cool J

LL Cool J singles chronology
"I'm That Type of Guy" (1989)	"Big Ole Butt" (1989)	"One Shot at Love" (1989)

Music video
- "Big Ole Butt" on YouTube

"Big Ole Butt" is the third single from LL Cool J's third album, Walking with a Panther. It was released in 1989 by Def Jam Recordings and was produced by Dwayne Simon and LL Cool J. It contains a sample of "Ride Sally Ride" by Dennis Coffey.

== Critical reception ==
Jesse Ducker, writing for Albumism, praised the single, stating that it was a "fun, bouncy tale of LL’s further forays into infidelity", and was one of the artist's "best efforts in seeking broader appeal while still maintaining his edge" However, Ducker criticized the rapper's decision to sing about "17-year-old conquests", noting that it was "creepy in retrospect." Music critic and author Adrian Denning criticized it during his review of Walking with a Panther, stating that it alongside several of the album's singles "invented lots that was not too pleasant about 90s rap".

== Use in popular culture ==
- Sean Combs covered the song for the 1997 compilation album In tha Beginning...There Was Rap.
- Nick Cannon sampled the song in "Your Pops Don't Like Me (I Really Don't Like This Dude)", the first single in his 2003 self-titled debut album.

== Charts ==
Chart (1989)	Peak position
US Hot Rap Songs (Billboard)	13
US Hot R&B/Hip-Hop Songs (Billboard)	57

== Track listing ==
A-side

1. "Big Ole Butt" (J.T. Smith, D. Simon, B. Latture) – 4:34

B-side

1. "One Shot at Love" (J.T. Smith, D. Simon, S. Ett) – 4:19
