= Jingling Baby =

Single by LL Cool J

from the album Walking with a Panther
- B-side: "Illegal Search"
- Released: January 8, 1989
- Genre: Hip hop
- Length: 4:16
- Label: Def Jam
- Songwriter(s): James Todd Smith; Dwayne Simon; Brian Latture
- Producer(s): Dwayne Simon; LL Cool J; Marley Marl

LL Cool J singles chronology
"One Shot at Love" (1989)	"Jingling Baby" (1989)	"To da Break of Dawn" (1990)

"Jingling Baby" is the final single released from LL Cool J's third album, Walking with a Panther. It was released on January 8, 1989 for Def Jam Recordings and was produced by LL Cool J and Dwayne Simon. The single version was remixed by Marley Marl. "Jingling Baby" peaked at #32 on the Hot R&B/Hip-Hop Songs. It was backed by remixed versions of "Illegal Search", a track from LL Cool J's fourth album, Mama Said Knock You Out. The song was later sampled by contemporary hip hop group A Tribe Called Quest on their penultimate album The Love Movement on the track "Against the World", and also by Ludacris in his 2012 single "Jingalin'". Both versions of "Illegal Search" featured here are exclusive to this single.

== Track listing ==
A-side

1. "Jingling Baby (Remixed And Still Jingling)" (J.T. Smith, D. Simon, B. Latture) - 5:07
- Remixed by Marley Marl
1. "Jingling Baby (Clean LP Version)"- 4:16

B-side

1. "Illegal Search (Keep On Searchin' Mix)" (J.T. Smith, M. Williams) - 5:03
2. "Illegal Search (Pre-Trial Hearing Mix)"- 3:27

== Samples ==
- "Walking into Sunshine" by Central Line
- "Scorpio" by Dennis Coffey
- "Black Belt Jones (Theme)" by Dennis Coffey
- "You and Love Are the Same" by The Grass Roots
