= Around the Way Girl =

Single by LL Cool J

from the album Mama Said Knock You Out
- Released: November 20, 1990
- Recorded: March 1989 – August 1990
- Genre: Golden age hip hop; East Coast hip hop; new jack swing; R&B; pop
- Length: 4:02
- Label: Def Jam; Columbia
- Songwriters: James Smith; Rick James; Marlon Williams
- Producers: Marley Marl, DJ Eddie F (remix)

LL Cool J singles chronology
| "The Boomin' System" (1990) | "Around the Way Girl" (1990) | "Mama Said Knock You Out" (1991) |

Music video
- "Around the Way Girl" on YouTube

"Around the Way Girl" is the third single by American rapper LL Cool J from his fourth album, Mama Said Knock You Out (1990). Released by Def Jam and Columbia Records, "Around the Way Girl" peaked at number nine on the US Billboard Hot 100, becoming LL Cool J's first top 10 single. It was also a hit on the US Cash Box Top 100, and the Billboard R&B and dance music charts, where it peaked at numbers 22, five and seven, respectively. The Recording Industry Association of America (RIAA) certified "Around the Way Girl" Gold on January 15, 1991, for sales of over 500,000 copies. The song later appeared on LL Cool J's 1996 greatest hits album, All World: Greatest Hits.

The song prominently samples Mary Jane Girls' 1983 breakout hit song, "All Night Long," along with Keni Burke's 1982 hit "Risin' to the Top", from which "All Night Long" had originally taken its bassline. The "All Night Long" sample ("you got me shook up, shook down, shook out on your loving...") is heard during the song's intro and at the end of the choruses, while the melody from "Risin' to the Top" is sampled during the verses.

== Music video ==
The music video for "Around the Way Girl" was filmed in what used to be a warehouse on Borden Avenue in Long Island City, Queens. The clip was directed by Paris Barclay. Big Lez appears.

== Reception ==
David Quantick of NME said the song "is almost as heavy as, say, MC Hammer, and expresses opinions of womankind which are no more and no less interesting than LL's previous spittle-flecked utterances.

== Single track listing ==
=== A-side ===
1. "Around The Way Girl" (LP Version)- 4:05
2. "Around The Way Girl" (Untouchables Remix feat. Chad Jones)- 4:32

=== B-side ===
1. "Around The Way Girl" (Instrumental)- 3:51
2. "Murdergram" (LP Version)- 3:52

== Official versions ==
- "Around the Way Girl" (Album Version) / (LP Version) - 4:05
- "Around the Way Girl" (Instrumental) - 3:51
- "Around the Way Girl" (Untouchables Remix feat. Chad Jones) - 4:32

== Charts ==
=== Weekly charts ===
Weekly chart performance for "Around the Way Girl"
| Chart (1990–1991) | Peak position |
|---|---|
| Australia (ARIA) | 45 |
| Luxembourg (Radio Luxembourg) | 11 |
| New Zealand (Recorded Music NZ) | 27 |
| UK Airplay (Music Week) | 37 |
| UK Dance (Music Week) | 9 |
| US Billboard Hot 100 | 9 |
| US Dance Club Songs (Billboard) | 7 |
| US Hot R&B/Hip-Hop Songs (Billboard) | 5 |
| US Hot Rap Songs (Billboard) | 1 |
| US Cash Box Top 100 | 22 |

=== Year-end charts ===
Year-end chart performance for "Around the Way Girl"
| Chart (1991) | Position |
|---|---|
| US Billboard Hot 100 | 64 |

== Certifications ==
Certifications and sales for "Around the Way Girl"
| Region | Certification | Certified units/sales |
|---|---|---|
| United States (RIAA) | Platinum | 1,000,000^{‡} |
^{‡} Sales+streaming figures based on certification alone.
