= I'm Bad =

Single by LL Cool J

from the album Bigger and Deffer
- B-side: "Get Down"
- Released: June 13, 1987
- Genre: Golden age hip hop; hardcore hip hop
- Length: 4:39
- Label: Def Jam
- Songwriter(s): James Todd Smith
- Producer(s): L.A. Posse; LL Cool J

LL Cool J singles chronology
"You'll Rock" (1986)	"I'm Bad" (1987)	"I Need Love" (1987)

Music video
- "I'm Bad" on YouTube

"I'm Bad" (sometimes written as I'm BAD) is the first single from LL Cool J's second album, Bigger and Deffer. It was released in 1987 for Def Jam Recordings and was produced by the production group, The L.A. Posse and LL Cool J, with Russell Simmons executive producing the single.

== Background ==
The song samples the "Theme from S.W.A.T." by Rhythm Heritage, LL Cool J's "Rock the Bells", Federal Signal Corporation's famous Q2B siren, and an interpolation of the theme song from the 1960s syndicated animated series Courageous Cat and Minute Mouse. It also uses a riff from "Daisy Lady", by 7th Wonder, which made the song being sampled at least 10 times.

== Reception and legacy ==
I'm Bad made it onto several Billboard charts. It was LL's Hot 100 debut, reaching #84. It also hit #4 on the Hot R&B/Hip-Hop Songs, #2 on the Hot Dance Music/Maxi-Singles Sales, #34 on the Hot Dance Music/Club Play, and #71 on the UK Singles Chart. "I'm Bad" was followed by the single "I Need Love" and "Go Cut Creator Go".

The song was sampled in return in Deejay Punk-Roc's My Beatbox which appeared in Thrasher Presents Skate and Destroy as well as in Eminem’s "Kamikaze" from the album of the same name. Ice-T's diss track "The Syndicate" mimics the song's hook.

The song was featured in the ESPN miniseries The Last Dance, where it played in "Episode II" during Michael Jordan's historic playoff game against the Boston Celtics in Game 2 of the first round of the 1986 NBA playoffs in which he scored 63 points. The song was featured in the series Everybody Hates Chris, in the episode “Everybody Hates Caruso” in 2007.

== Track listing ==
The Bigger Side

- "I'm Bad"- 4:39

The Deffer Side

- "Get Down"- 3:23

== Certifications ==
Region	Certification	Certified units/sales
United States (RIAA)	Gold	500,000^{‡}
^{‡} Sales+streaming figures based on certification alone.
