= Bigger and Deffer =

Studio album by LL Cool J
- Released: May 29, 1987
- Recorded: 1986–1987
- Studios: Chung King House of Metal (New York City, New York)
- Genre: Hip hop
- Length: 45:13
- Labels: Def Jam; Columbia
- Producers: LL Cool J; L.A. Posse; Steve Ett

LL Cool J chronology
Radio (1985)	Bigger and Deffer (1987)	Walking with a Panther (1989)

Singles from Bigger and Deffer
- 1. "I'm Bad" Released: June 13, 1987; 2. "I Need Love" Released: July 22, 1987

Professional ratings
Review scores
Source	Rating
AllMusic	3.5/5 stars
Los Angeles Times	2.5/4 stars
Q	3/5 stars
RapReviews	7.5/10
The Rolling Stone Album Guide	2.5/5 stars
Spin Alternative Record Guide	7/10
The Village Voice	C+

Bigger and Deffer (abbreviated as BAD on the album cover) is the second studio album by American rapper LL Cool J, released on May 29, 1987, by Def Jam Recordings and Columbia Records. With over two million copies sold in the United States, it remains one of LL Cool J's best-selling releases. Bigger and Deffer dominated the summer of 1987, spending 11 weeks atop the Billboard Top Black Albums (now the Top R&B/Hip-Hop Albums) chart, and peaking at number three on the Billboard 200. It became the fourth hip hop album to receive platinum certification by the Recording Industry Association of America (RIAA).

Bigger and Deffer features the hit single "I'm Bad", and the first commercially successful rap ballad, "I Need Love". It also contains the track "Go Cut Creator Go", which paid homage to his DJ. Other tracks like "Kanday", "The Do Wop", "My Rhyme Ain't Done", "The Breakthrough", and "The Bristol Hotel" were also popular with fans, and helped make the album a hip-hop classic. In 1998, the album was selected as one of The Source's 100 Best Rap Albums. The cover photo was taken in front of Andrew Jackson High School in Queens (from which he dropped out), while standing on the hood of his Audi 5000, and the back cover was shot in his grandmother's basement (his residence at the time). Both images were shot by Glen E. Friedman.

== Critical reception ==
Robert Christgau wrote that Bigger and Deffer paled beside LL Cool J's debut album, Radio: "Like the pop-metal egotists he resembles every which way but white, J proves that there's something worse than a middle-class adolescent who's gotta be a big shot this instant--the same adolescent the instant he becomes a big shot. Overrated though it was, the debut had guts, spritz, musical integrity, and Rick Rubin. Breakthrough though it may be, the follow-up has a swelled head, a swollen dick, received beats, and quotes from Berry, Brown, and the Moonglows that confuse me. Could it be that the planet existed before he brought it to fruition?"

== Track listing ==
All tracks written and produced by LL Cool J and L.A. Posse, except where noted.

Bigger and Deffer track listing
No.	Title	Writer(s)	Producer(s)	Length
1.	"I'm Bad"	James Todd Smith; Bobby Ervin; Darryl Pierce		4:39
2.	"Kanday"	Smith; Erving; Pierce		3:59
3.	"Get Down"	Smith; Erving; Pierce		3:23
4.	"The Bristol Hotel"	Smith; Mark Jordan; Pierce		2:43
5.	"My Rhyme Ain't Done"	Smith; Erving; Pierce		3:45
6.	".357 – Break It On Down"	Smith; Jordan; Pierce		4:05
7.	"Go Cut Creator Go"	Smith; Erving; Pierce		3:57
8.	"The Breakthrough"	Smith; Steven Ettinger	Steve Ett	4:04
9.	"I Need Love"	Smith; Erving; Pierce		5:23
10.	"Ahh, Let's Get Ill"	Smith; Erving; Pierce		3:45
11.	"The Do Wop"	Smith; Erving; Pierce		4:59
12.	"On the Ill Tip" (skit)	Smith		0:31
Total length:				45:13

== Personnel ==
- James Todd Smith – vocals, producer
- Bobby Ervin – disc jockey
- Russell Simmons – production supervisor
- Steven Ett – engineer, mixing
- Rod Hui – engineer
- Jay Henry – engineer
- Mark Mandelbaum – engineer
- Chuck Vale – assistant engineer
- Howie Weinberg – mastering
- L.A. Posse (Darryl Pierce, Dwayne Simon, and Bobby Erving) – additional vocals, producer
- Eric Haze – design
- Nelson George – liner notes
- Glen E. Friedman – liner photography

== Charts ==
=== Album ===
Weekly chart performance for Bigger and Deffer
Chart (1987)	Peak position
Dutch Albums (Album Top 100)	28
German Albums (Offizielle Top 100)	35
New Zealand Albums (RMNZ)	23
Swedish Albums (Sverigetopplistan)	48
UK Albums (Official Charts)	54
US Billboard 200	3
US Top R&B/Hip-Hop Albums (Billboard)	1

=== Singles ===
Singles from Bigger and Deffer
Title	Single information
"I'm Bad"	Released: June 13, 1987; B-side: "Get Down"; Billboard Hot 100 No. 84; Hot Black Singles No. 4; Hot Dance Music/Maxi-Singles Sales No. 23; Hot Dance Music/Club Play No. 34
"I Need Love"	Released: July 2, 1987 (entered Billboard's Hot 100 chart week ending August 1); B-side: "My Rhyme Ain't Done"; Billboard Hot 100 No. 14; Hot Black Singles No. 1

== Certifications ==
Certifications for Bigger and Deffer
Region	Certification	Certified units/sales
Canada (Music Canada)	Gold	50,000^{^}
United States (RIAA)	2× Platinum	2,000,000^{^}
^{^} Shipments figures based on certification alone.
