= Going Back to Cali (LL Cool J song) =

Single by LL Cool J

from the album Less than Zero and Walking with a Panther
- B-side: "Jack the Ripper"
- Released: January 25, 1988
- Recorded: 1987
- Genre: Golden age hip hop
- Length: 3:57
- Label: Def Jam
- Songwriters: Rick Rubin; James Todd Smith
- Producer: Rick Rubin

LL Cool J singles chronology
"Go Cut Creator Go" (1987)	"Going Back to Cali" (1988)	"I'm That Type of Guy" (1989)

Music video
- "Going Back to Cali" on YouTube

"Going Back to Cali" is a 1988 single by LL Cool J from the Less than Zero soundtrack album as well as his third album, Walking with a Panther. The song was co-written and produced by Rick Rubin. It peaked at No. 31 on the Billboard Hot 100 and #12 on the Hot R&B/Hip-Hop Songs, and was eventually certified gold by the RIAA on May 28, 1991, and platinum on May 30, 2017.

The song features LL Cool J vacillating about moving to California, rapping in the chorus, "I'm going back to Cali", followed by "I don't think so". In the verses, he describes a trip to Los Angeles in which he meets several women but is scared off because they are too sexually aggressive. The basic concept for the song was Rubin's, based on his own ambivalence about possibly moving from New York City to Los Angeles.

The b-side is "Jack the Ripper", a diss track aimed at Kool Moe Dee, as a response to Moe Dee's "How Ya Like Me Now".

== Music video ==
The music video for "Going Back to Cali" was directed by Ric Menello. It was shot in black and white and was filmed mostly at two Los Angeles landmarks, the Venice neighborhood and the Griffith Observatory, as an homage to two of Menello's favorite films, Touch of Evil (1958) and Rebel Without a Cause (1955), respectively. It featured appearances by record producer Rick Rubin, models Ele Keats, Ally Downs and MTV's veejay Martha Quinn.

== Covers ==
- Rock band Sevendust covered the song on the 2000 album Take a Bite Outta Rhyme: A Rock Tribute to Rap.
- Record Producer Jonathan Hay released "Going Back to Cali (Reimagined as Drum & Bass)" on January 27, 2023, the 35th anniversary of LL's original single.

== Parodies and references ==
- The 1990 music video "Going Back to Brooklyn", starring Colin Quinn and directed by Ben Stiller, parodied the song and music video. In the video, Quinn raps about being afraid to return to his home town because he is no longer tough enough.
- The 1990 Sonic Youth song "Kool Thing" includes references to "Going Back to Cali" in both the song's lyrics and its music video; the song was intended as an attack on LL Cool J for his perceived misogyny.
- The 2008 promotional video "Going Back to Philly", intended to promote the upcoming season of It's Always Sunny in Philadelphia, had its music performed by Jeru the Damaja, with the video featuring the show's cast.
- The music video for Eminem's 2013 song "Berzerk" referred to the "Going Back to Cali" video in a scene showing Rick Rubin playing cards.
- In 2015, Jimmy Fallon cold-opened an episode of The Tonight Show with a shortened version of the song and music video, to kick off a week of hosting the show in California. LL Cool J has a cameo appearance in the video.
- The ESPN commercial for the Los Angeles Rams August 13 preseason game opener against the Dallas Cowboys uses the song.
- The song was briefly featured in the 2017 movie: Transformers: The Last Knight, one of the live-action movies that are based on the Transformers toyline.
- The song was used in the third season of the Netflix series Narcos. The final episode of the season was named "Going Back to Cali", a play on words between Cali (short for California) and Cali (the city in Colombia where the show takes place).
- The first minute or so of the song was played at Citi Field after the New York Mets won Game 5 of the 2024 National League Championship Series against the Los Angeles Dodgers, in celebration of their forcing the series to 'go back to Cali' for Game 6. The "I don't think so" part of the song was removed, and replaced by silence for a second or so before the song resumed. (If the Mets had lost Game 5, the Dodgers would have won the NLCS and advanced to the World Series.)

== Track listing ==
1. "Going Back to Cali" (R. Rubin, J. T. Smith) – 3:57
2. "Jack the Ripper" (Rubin, Smith) – 4:50

== Charts ==
Chart (1988)	Peak position
US Billboard Hot 100	31
US Hot R&B/Hip-Hop Songs (Billboard)	12
US Dance Singles Sales (Billboard)	19

== Certifications ==
Region	Certification	Certified units/sales
United States (RIAA)	Platinum	1,000,000^{‡}
^{‡} Sales+streaming figures based on certification alone.
