= L.A. Posse =

American hip hop group

- Also known as: L.A.P.
- Origin: Los Angeles, California, U.S.
- Genres: Hip hop
- Years active: 1987–present
- Labels: Def Jam, Atlantic, Epic, Columbia, Sleeping Bag Records
- Past members: Muffla; Big Dad; DJ Bobcat; DJ Pooh
- Website: www.covertentertainmentsoundworks.com

The L.A. Posse is an American hip hop record production team, composed of DJ Pooh, DJ Bobcat, Muffla, and Big Dad.

== History ==
L.A. Posse was initially made up of founders Dwayne "Muffla" Simon and Darryl "Big Dad" Pierce who were later joined by Bobby "DJ Bobcat" Ervin and Mark "DJ Pooh" Jordan. The team first rose to prominence when Def Jam founder Russell Simmons signed them to produce for rapper Breeze, leading to Simmons asking them to do pre-production on LL Cool J's 1987 album Bigger and Deffer. Bigger and Deffer was a huge success and led to L.A. Posse producing The Real Roxanne's eponymous album. During this period, Muffla also co-wrote Run-D.M.C.'s single "Beats to the Rhyme".

In 1989, the L.A. Posse left Def Jam and signed with Atlantic Records, producing Breeze's album The Young Son of No One which yielded the charting rap single "L.A. Posse". Some of the members of the group also ended up producing on LL Cool J's later albums Walking with a Panther, Mama Said Knock You Out and 14 Shots to the Dome. Following this, the group recorded their own album, They Come in All Colors, in 1991.

Muffla is currently heading new multimedia company Covert Entertainment Soundworks, Big Dad has been connected with Dr. Dre, John Singleton, Nona Gaye and others, Bobcat has been working with Dr. Dre and Battlecat at The Pharmacy, while DJ Pooh has expanded into a Hollywood powerhouse with films Friday, 3 Strikes, The Wash and Grow House.
