= LL Cool J =

American rapper (born 1968)

- LL Cool J in 2026
- Born: James Todd Smith; January 14, 1968 (age 58); Bay Shore, New York, U.S.
- Occupations: Rapper; songwriter; record producer; actor
- Years active: 1984–present
- Works: Discography; filmography
- Spouse: Simone Johnson (m. 1995)
- Partner: Kidada Jones (1992–1994)
- Children: 4
- Awards: Full list
- Musical career
- Origin: Queens, New York City, U.S.
- Genres: East Coast hip-hop; R&B
- Labels: Virgin; 429; Def Jam; Columbia; CBS; Violator; S-BRO
- Website: llcoolj.com

James Todd Smith (born January 14, 1968), known professionally as LL Cool J (short for Ladies Love Cool James), is an American rapper and actor. He is one of the earliest rappers to realize crossover commercial success, alongside fellow new-school hip-hop acts like Run-DMC.

Signed by Def Jam Recordings in 1984, LL Cool J's breakthrough came with his 1984 single "I Need a Beat", followed by his debut studio album, Radio (1985). He achieved continued commercial and critical success with the albums Bigger and Deffer (1987), Walking with a Panther (1989), Mama Said Knock You Out (1990), Mr. Smith (1995), and Phenomenon (1997). His twelfth album, Exit 13 (2008), concluded his contract with Def Jam; he later signed with the label once more to release his fourteenth album, The FORCE (2024).

LL Cool J has appeared in several films, including Toys, Halloween H20, In Too Deep, Any Given Sunday, Deep Blue Sea, S.W.A.T., Mindhunters, Last Holiday, and Edison. From 2009 to 2023, he played NCIS Special Agent Sam Hanna in the CBS crime drama television series NCIS: Los Angeles and reprised his role in NCIS: Hawaiʻi (2023–2024) and NCIS (2025), and NCIS: New York (2026–present). LL Cool J was also the host of Lip Sync Battle on Paramount Network.

A two-time Grammy Award winner, LL Cool J is known for hip-hop songs such as "Going Back to Cali", "I'm Bad", "The Boomin' System", "Rock the Bells", and "Mama Said Knock You Out", as well as R&B hits such as "I Need Love", "Doin' It", "Loungin", "Around the Way Girl" and "Hey Lover". In 2010, VH1 placed him on their "100 Greatest Artists of All Time" list. In 2017, LL Cool J became the first rapper to receive the Kennedy Center Honors. In 2021, he was inducted into the Rock and Roll Hall of Fame in the Musical Excellence category.

== Early life and family ==
James Todd Smith was born on January 14, 1968, in Bay Shore, New York, on Long Island, to Ondrea Ortiz of Puerto Rican descent (born January 19, 1946) and James Louis Smith Jr., also known as James Nunya. His grandfather, who adopted Smith's mother, is of Barbadian descent. His 1997 memoir says his father abused his mother. According to the Chicago Tribune, "[As] a kid growing up middle class and Catholic in Queens, life for Smith was heart-breaking. His father shot his mother and grandfather, nearly killing them both. When 4-year-old Smith found them, blood was everywhere." In 1972, Smith and his mother moved into his grandparents' home in St. Albans, Queens, where he was raised. He suffered physical and mental abuse from his mother's ex-boyfriend Roscoe.

Smith began rapping at the age of 10, influenced by the hip-hop group The Treacherous Three. In 1984, sixteen-year-old Smith was creating demo tapes in his grandparents' home. His grandfather, a jazz saxophonist, bought him $2,000 worth of equipment, including two turntables, an audio mixer and an amplifier. During this time, Smith reconciled with his father who "made amends for a lot of things" by offering him guidance at the start of his music career. His mother was also supportive of his musical endeavors, using her tax refund to buy him a Korg drum machine. Smith has stated that by the time he received musical equipment from his relatives, he "was already a rapper. In this neighborhood, the kids grow up in rap. It's like speaking Spanish if you grow up in an all-Spanish house." This was at the same time that NYU student Rick Rubin and promoter-manager Russell Simmons founded the then-independent Def Jam label. By using the mixer he had received from his grandfather, Smith produced and mixed his own demos and sent them to various record companies throughout New York City, including Def Jam.

== Musical career ==
In the VH1 documentary Planet Rock: The Story of Hip Hop and the Crack Generation, Smith revealed that he initially called himself J-Ski, but did not want to associate his stage name with the cocaine culture (The rappers who use "Ski" or "Blow" as part of their stage name, e.g., Kurtis Blow and Joeski Love, were associated with the rise of the cocaine culture.) Under his new stage name LL Cool J (an abbreviation for Ladies Love Cool James), coined by his friend and fellow rapper Mikey D, Smith was signed by Def Jam, which led to the release of his first official record, the 12-inch single "I Need a Beat" (1984). The single was a hard-hitting, streetwise b-boy song with spare beats and ballistic rhymes. Smith later discussed his search for a label, stating "I sent my demo to many different companies, but it was Def Jam where I found my home." That same year, Smith made his professional debut concert performance at Manhattan Center High School. In a later interview, LL Cool J recalled the experience, stating "They pushed the lunch room tables together and me and my DJ, Cut Creator, started playing. ... As soon as it was over there were girls screaming and asking for autographs. Right then and there I said 'This is what I want to do'." LL's debut single sold over 100,000 copies and helped establish both Def Jam as a label and Smith as a rapper. The commercial success of "I Need a Beat", along with the Beastie Boys' single "Rock Hard" (1984), helped lead Def Jam to a distribution deal with Columbia Records the following year.

=== 1985–1987: Radio ===
Radio was released to critical acclaim, both for production innovation and LL's powerful rap. Released November 18, 1985, on Def Jam Recordings in the United States, Radio earned a significant amount of commercial success and sales for a hip-hop record at the time. Shortly after its release, the album sold over 500,000 copies in its first five months, eventually selling over 1 million copies by 1988, according to the Recording Industry Association of America. Radio peaked at number 6 on the Top R&B/Hip-Hop Albums chart and at number 46 on the Billboard 200 albums chart. It entered the Top R&B/Hip-Hop Albums chart on December 28, 1985, and remained there for 47 weeks, while also entering the Pop Albums chart on January 11, 1986, remaining on that chart for thirty-eight weeks. By 1989, the album had earned platinum status from the Recording Industry Association of America (RIAA), with sales exceeding one million copies; it had previously earned a gold certification in the United States on April 14, 1986. "I Can't Live Without My Radio" and "Rock the Bells" were singles that helped the album go platinum. It eventually reached 1,500,000 copies sold in the U.S.

With the breakthrough success of his hit single "I Need a Beat" and the Radio LP, LL Cool J became one of the early hip-hop acts to achieve mainstream success along with Kurtis Blow and Run-D.M.C. Gigs at larger venues were offered to LL as he would join the 1986–'87 Raising Hell tour, opening for Run-D.M.C. and the Beastie Boys. Another milestone of LL's popularity was his appearance on American Bandstand as the first hip-hop act on the show, as well as an appearance on Diana Ross' 1987 television special, Red Hot Rhythm & Blues.

The album's success also helped in contributing to Rick Rubin's credibility and repertoire as a record producer. Radio, along with Raising Hell (1986) and Licensed to Ill (1986), would form a trilogy of New York City-based, Rubin-helmed albums that helped to diversify hip-hop. Rubin's production credit on the back cover reads "REDUCED BY RICK RUBIN", referring to his minimalist production style, which gave the album its stripped-down and gritty sound. This style would serve as one of Rubin's production trademarks and would have a great impact on future hip-hop productions. Rubin's early hip-hop production work, before his exit from Def Jam to Los Angeles, helped solidify his legacy as a hip-hop pioneer and establish his reputation in the music industry.

=== 1987–1993: Breakthrough and success ===
LL Cool J's second album was 1987's Bigger and Deffer, which was produced by DJ Pooh and the L.A. Posse. This stands as one of his biggest-selling career albums, having sold in excess of two million copies in the United States alone. It spent 11 weeks at No. 1 on Billboard's R&B albums chart. It also reached No. 3 on the Billboard's Pop albums chart. The album featured the singles "I'm Bad", the revolutionary "I Need Love" – LL's first No. 1 R&B and Top 40 hit, "Kanday", "Bristol Hotel", and "Go Cut Creator Go". While Bigger and Deffer, which was a big success, was produced by the L.A. Posse (at the time consisting of Dwayne Simon, Darryl Pierce and, according to himself the most important for crafting the sound of the LP, Bobby "Bobcat" Ervin), Dwayne Simon was the only one left willing to work on producing LL Cool J's third album Walking with a Panther. Released in 1989, the album was a commercial success, with several charting singles ("Going Back to Cali", which had originally been released on the 1987 movie soundtrack Less than Zero, "I'm That Type of Guy", "Big Ole Butt", and "One Shot at Love"). Despite commercial appeal, the album was often criticized by the hip-hop community as being too commercial and materialistic, and for focusing too much on love ballads. As a result, his audience base began to decline due to the album's bold commercial and pop aspirations. According to Billboard, the album peaked at No. 6 on the Billboard 200 and was LL Cool J's second No. 1 R&B Album where it spent five weeks.

In 1990, LL released Mama Said Knock You Out, his fourth studio album. The Marley Marl produced album received critical acclaim and eventually went double Platinum, selling over two million copies according to the RIAA. Mama Said Knock You Out marked a turning point in LL Cool J's career, as he proved to critics his ability to stay relevant and hard-edged despite the misgivings of his previous album. LL won a Grammy Award for Best Rap Solo Performance in 1992 for the title track. The album's immense success propelled Mama Said Knock You Out to be LL's top selling album of his career (as of 2002) and solidified his status as a hip-hop icon. During this time, LL also recorded a rap solo for Michael Jackson's demo of a song called "Serious Effect" which remains unreleased, but was later leaked online.

=== 1993–2005: Continued success and career prominence ===
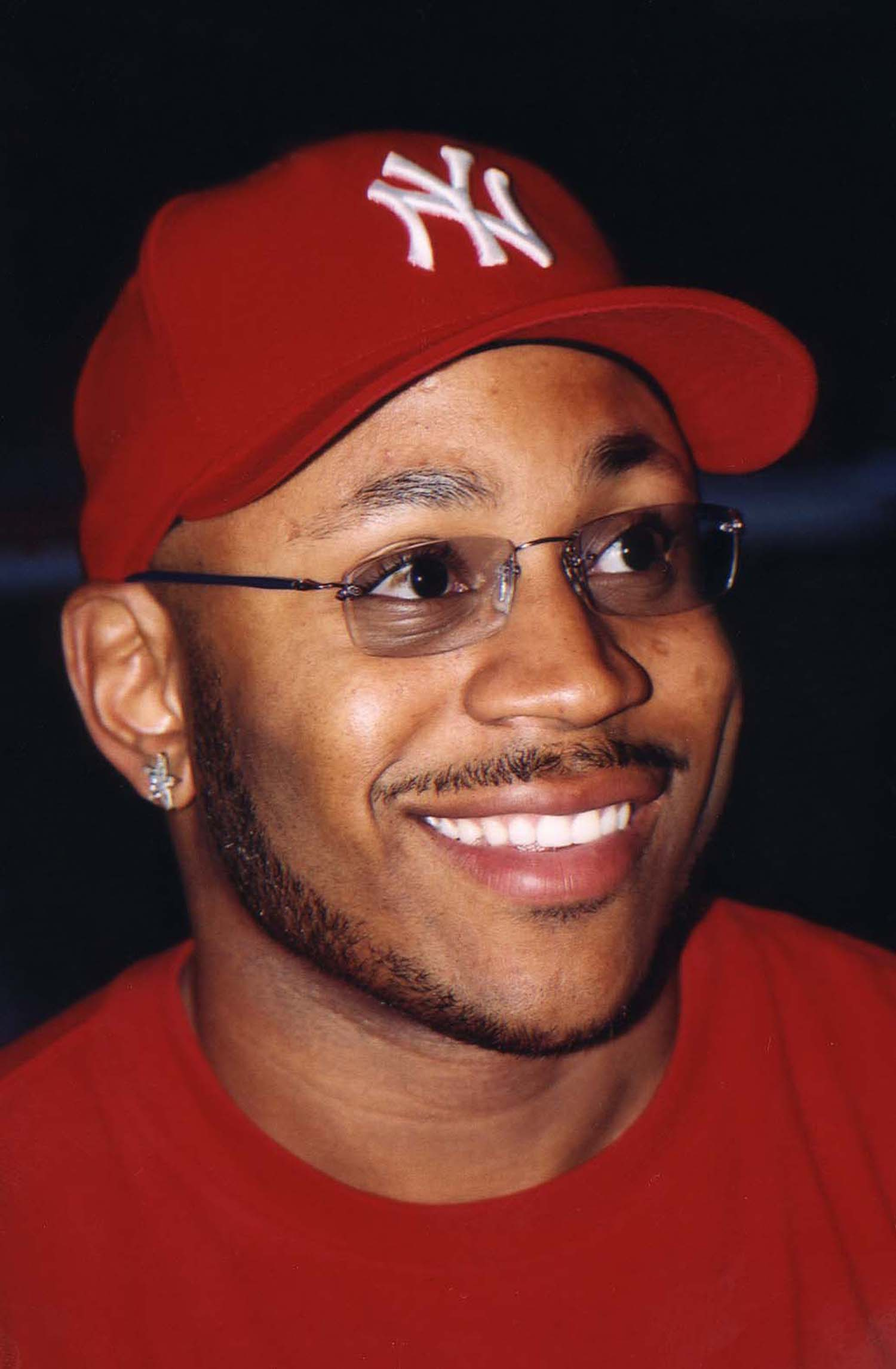
LL Cool J in 1999

After acting in The Hard Way and Toys, LL Cool J released 14 Shots to the Dome in March 1993. The album had four singles ("How I'm Comin'", "Back Seat (of My Jeep)", "Pink Cookies in a Plastic Bag Getting Crushed by Buildings", "Stand By Your Man") and guest-featured Lords of the Underground on "NFA-No Frontin' Allowed". That June, the album went gold.

LL Cool J starred in In the House, an NBC sitcom, before releasing his album Mr. Smith (1995), which went on to sell over two million copies. Its singles included "Hey Lover", "Doin' It" and "Loungin". "Hey Lover", featured Boyz II Men, and sampled Michael Jackson's "The Lady in My Life". The song also earned him a Grammy Award. Another song from the album, "I Shot Ya Remix", included debut vocal work by Foxy Brown. In 1996, Def Jam released this "greatest hits" package, offering a good summary of Cool J's career, from the relentless minimalism of early hits such as "Rock the Bells" to the smooth-talking braggadocio that followed. Classic albums including Bigger and Deffer and Mama Said Knock You Out are well represented here. In December 1996, his loose cover of the Rufus and Chaka Khan song "Ain't Nobody" was included on the Beavis and Butt-Head Do America soundtrack & released as a single. LL Cool J's interpretation of "Ain't Nobody" was particularly successful in the United Kingdom, where it topped the UK Singles Chart in early-1997. Later that same year, he released the album Phenomenon. The singles included "Phenomenon" and "Father". The official second single from Phenomenon was "4, 3, 2, 1", which featured Method Man, Redman & Master P and introduced DMX and Canibus.

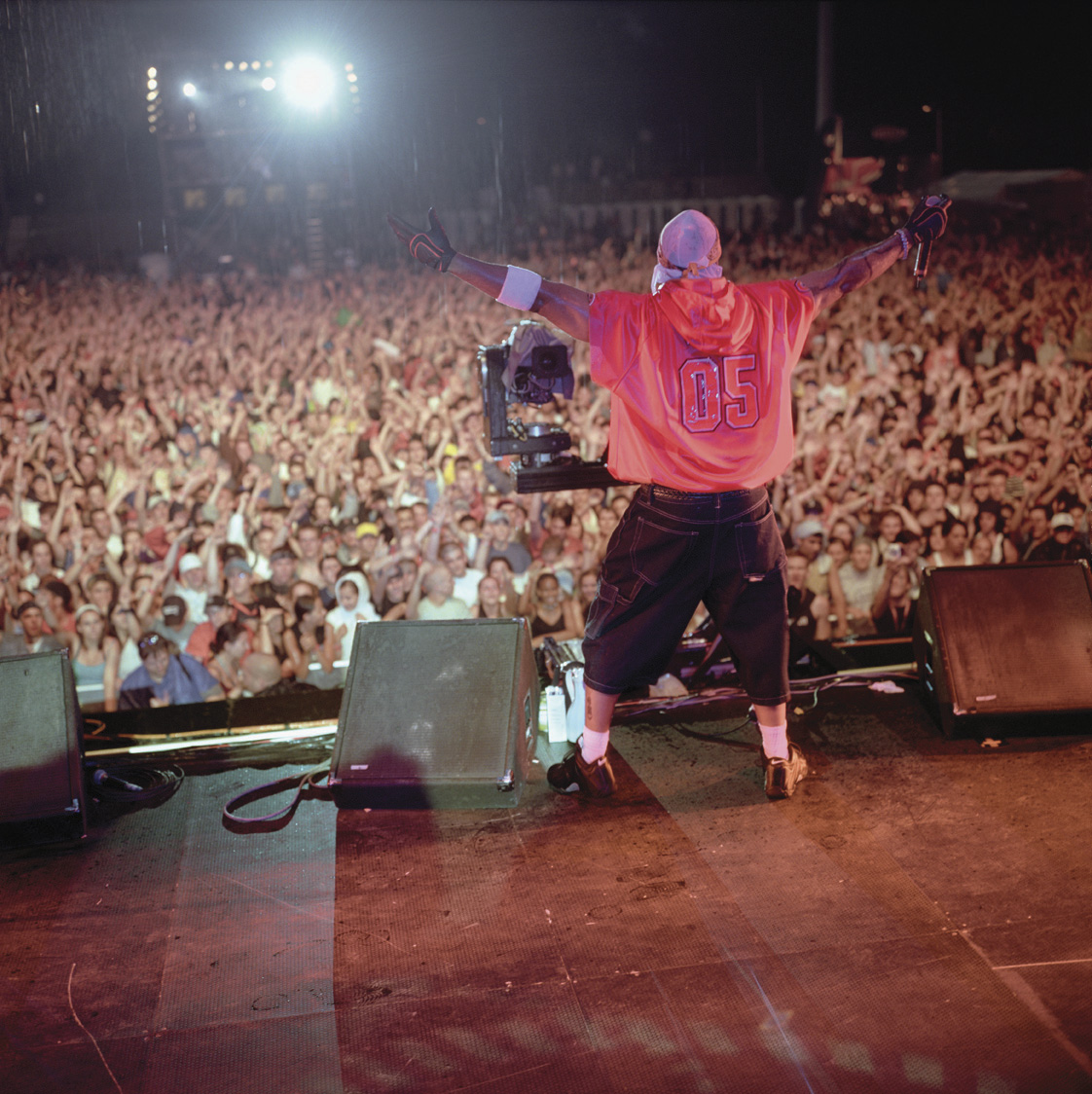
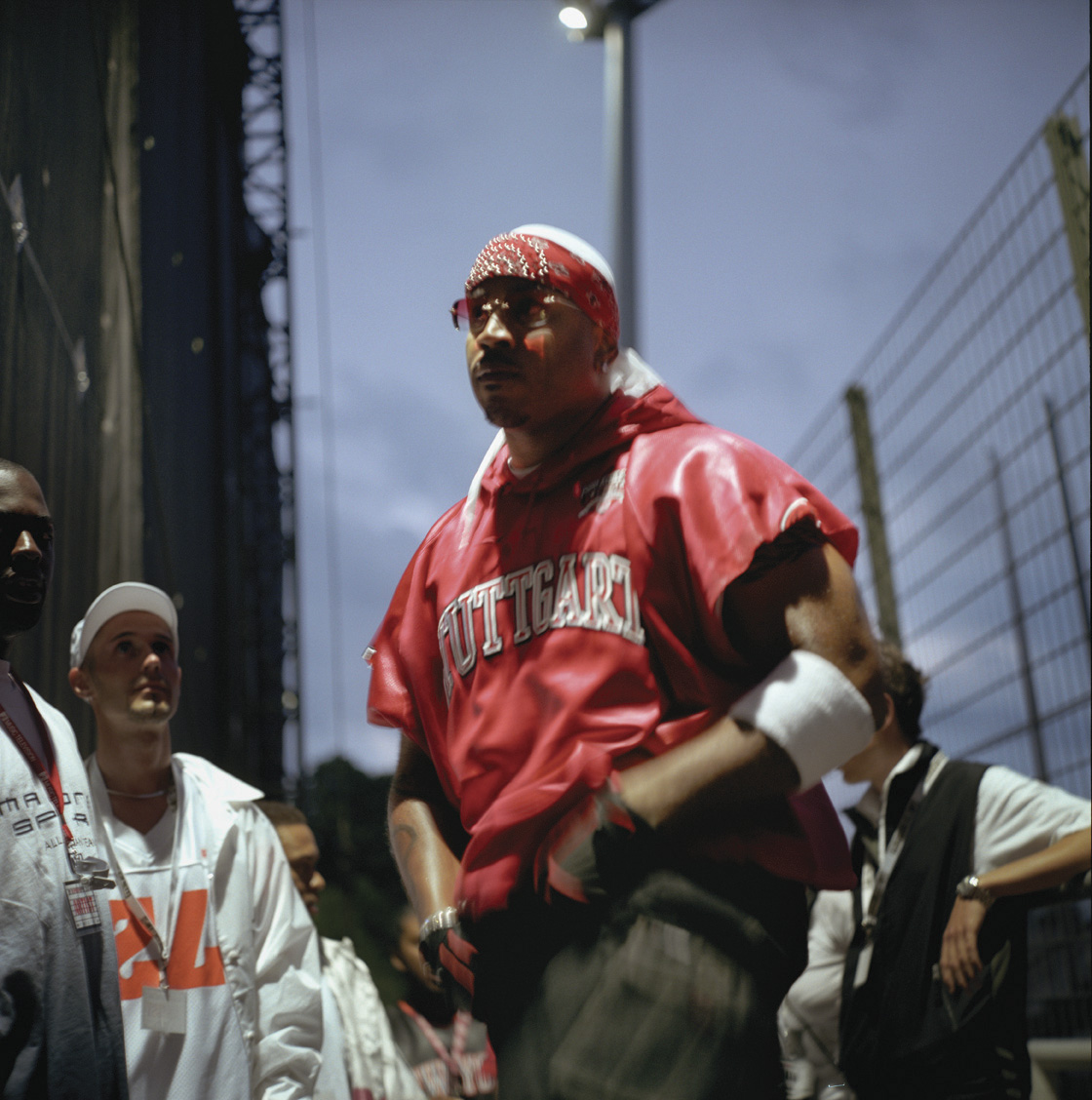
LL Cool J during a 2001 performance in Germany

In 2000, LL Cool J released the album G.O.A.T., which stood for the "Greatest of All Time." It debuted at number one on the Billboard album charts, and went platinum. LL Cool J thanked Canibus in the liner notes of the album, "for the inspiration". LL Cool J's next album 10 from 2002, was his ninth studio (10th overall including his greatest hits compilation All World), and included the singles "Paradise" (featuring Amerie), and the number 1 R&B hit "Luv U Better", produced by the Neptunes. Later pressings of the album added the 2003 Jennifer Lopez duet, "All I Have". The album reached platinum status. LL Cool J's tenth album The DEFinition was released on August 31, 2004. The album debuted at No. 4 on the Billboard charts. Production came from Timbaland, 7 Aurelius, R. Kelly, and others. The lead single was the Timbaland-produced "Headsprung", which peaked at No. 7 on the Hip-Hop and R&B singles chart, and No. 16 on the Billboard Hot 100. The second single was the 7 Aurelius–produced, "Hush", which peaked at No. 14 on the Billboard Hip-Hop and R&B chart and No. 26 on the Hot 100.

=== 2006–2012: Exit 13 and touring ===
LL Cool J's 11th album, Todd Smith, was released on April 11, 2006. It includes collaborations with 112, Ginuwine, Juelz Santana, Teairra Mari and Freeway. The first single was the Jermaine Dupri-produced "Control Myself" featuring Jennifer Lopez. They shot the video for "Control Myself" on January 2, 2006, at Sony Studios, New York. The second video, directed by Hype Williams, was "Freeze" featuring Lyfe Jennings.

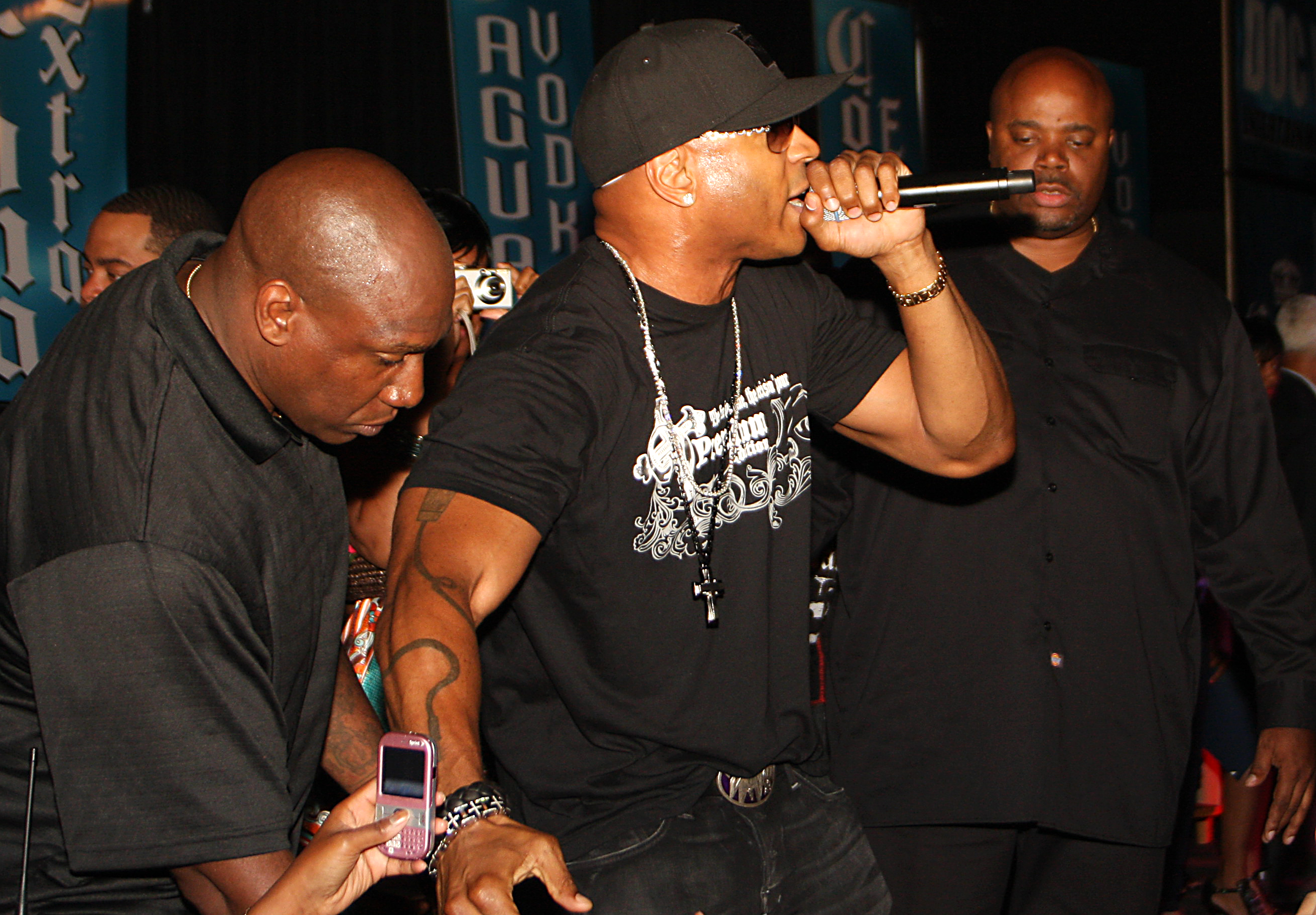
LL Cool J performing in Wilmington, Delaware in August 2008

In July 2006, LL Cool J announced details about his final album with Def Jam Recordings, the only label he has ever been signed to. The album is titled Exit 13. The album was originally scheduled to be executively produced by fellow Queens rapper 50 Cent. Exit 13 was originally slated for a fall 2006 release, however, after a 2-year delay, it was released on September 9, 2008, without 50 Cent as the executive producer. Tracks that the two worked on were leaked to the internet and some of the tracks produced with 50 made it to Exit 13. LL Cool J partnered with DJ Kay Slay to release a mixtape called "The Return of the G.O.A.T.". It was the first mixtape of his 24-year career and includes freestyling by LL Cool J in addition to other rappers giving their renditions of his songs. A track titled "Hi Haterz" was leaked onto the internet on June 1, 2008. The song contains LL Cool J rapping over the instrumental to Maino's "Hi Hater". He toured with Janet Jackson on her Rock Witchu tour, only playing in Los Angeles, Chicago, Toronto, and Kansas City.

In September 2009, LL Cool J released a song about the NCIS TV series. It is a single and is available on iTunes. The new track is based on his experiences playing special agent Sam Hanna. "This song is the musical interpretation of what I felt after meeting with NCIS agents, experienced Marines and Navy SEALs," LL Cool J said. "It represents the collective energy in the room. I was so inspired I wrote the song on set."

At South by Southwest in March 2011, LL Cool J was revealed to be Z-Trip's special guest at the Red Bull Thre3Style showcase. This marked the beginning of a creative collaboration between the rap and DJ superstars. The two took part in an interview with Carson Daly where they discussed their partnership. Both artists have promised future collaborations down the road, with LL Cool J calling the duo "organic" One early track to feature LL's talents was Z-Trip's remix of British rock act Kasabian's single "Days Are Forgotten", which was named by influential DJ Zane Lowe as his "Hottest Record In The World" and received a favorable reception in both Belgium and the United Kingdom. In January 2012, the pair released the track "Super Baller" as a free download to celebrate the New York Giants Super Bowl victory. The two have been touring together since 2011, with future dates planned through 2012 and beyond.

=== 2012–2023: Authentic, G.O.A.T. 2 and recognition ===
On October 6, 2012, LL Cool J released "Ratchet", a new single from his upcoming album titled Authentic Hip-Hop. Following that, on November 3, 2012, LL collaborated with Joe and the production duo Trackmasters on his second single, "Take It".

On February 8, 2013, it was announced that the title of LL's upcoming album would be changed from Authentic Hip-Hop to Authentic, with a new release date of April 30, 2013. A new cover was also unveiled. At around the same time, it was announced that LL Cool J had collaborated with Van Halen guitarist Eddie Van Halen on two tracks on the album.

On October 16, 2013, the Rock and Roll Hall of Fame announced LL Cool J as a nominee for inclusion in 2014. In October 2014, LL announced that his 14th studio album would be called G.O.A.T. 2 and would be released in 2015. LL stated that "the concept behind the album was to give upcoming artists an opportunity to shine, and put myself in the position where I have to spit bars with some of the hardest rhymers in the game"; however, the album was put on hold. LL Cool J explained the reason for it, saying, "It was good but I didn't feel like it was ready yet."

On January 21, 2016, LL received a star on the Hollywood Walk of Fame.

In March 2016, LL announced his retirement on social media, but quickly walked back his announcement and indicated that a new album was on the way. LL hosted the Grammy Awards Show for five consecutive years, from the 54th Grammy Awards on February 12, 2012, through the 58th Grammy Awards on February 15, 2016.

In October 2018, LL Cool J was nominated for the Rock and Roll Hall of Fame. In September 2019, it was announced that LL had re-signed to Def Jam for future album releases.

On December 29, 2021, LL Cool J canceled his performance at Dick Clark's New Year's Rockin' Eve With Ryan Seacrest 2022 after testing positive for COVID-19.

LL Cool J hosted the 2022 iHeartRadio Music Awards on March 22, 2022.

=== 2024–present: The FORCE ===
On June 14, 2024, LL Cool J released the single "Saturday Night Special", featuring rappers Rick Ross and Fat Joe; the single marks LL Cool J's first single as a lead artist in eight years and serves as the lead single from his fourteenth studio album, The FORCE, which is entirely produced by Q-Tip. The album was released on September 6, 2024, under Def Jam Recordings, his first under the label since 2008's Exit 13, and distributed by Def Jam and UMG's sister counterpart Virgin Music Group, instead of parent company Universal Music Group. The single "Proclivities", featuring rapper Saweetie, was released in August 2024. On August 31, 2024, LL Cool J released the album's fourth single "Murdergram Deux", featuring Eminem.

== Acting career ==
While LL Cool J first appeared as a rapper in the movie Krush Groove (performing "I Can't Live Without My Radio"), his first acting part was a small role in a high school football movie called Wildcats. He landed the role of Captain Patrick Zevo in Barry Levinson's 1992 film Toys. From 1995 to 1999, he starred in his own television sitcom In the House. He portrayed an ex-Oakland Raiders running back who finds himself in financial difficulties and is forced to rent part of his home out to a single mother and her two children, one of whom moves out with her before the third season.

In 1998, LL Cool J played security guard Ronny in Halloween H20: 20 Years Later, the seventh movie in the Halloween franchise. In 1999, he co-starred as Preacher, the chef in the Renny Harlin horror/comedy Deep Blue Sea. He received positive reviews for his role as Dwayne Gittens, an underworld boss nicknamed "God", in In Too Deep. Later that year, he starred as Julian Washington—a talented but selfish running back on fictional professional football team the Miami Sharks—in Oliver Stone's drama Any Given Sunday. He and co-star Jamie Foxx allegedly got into a real fistfight while filming a fight scene. During the next two years, LL Cool J appeared in Rollerball, Deliver Us from Eva, S.W.A.T., and Mindhunters.

In 2005, he returned to television in a guest-starring role on the Fox medical drama House; he portrayed a death row inmate felled by an unknown disease in an episode titled "Acceptance". He appeared as Queen Latifah's love interest in the 2006 movie Last Holiday. He also guest-starred on 30 Rock in the 2007 episode "The Source Awards", portraying a hip-hop producer called Ridikulous who Tracy Jordan fears may kill him. LL Cool J appeared in Sesame Street's 39th season, introducing the word of the day--"Unanimous"—in episode 4169 (September 22, 2008) and performing "The Addition Expedition" in episode 4172 (September 30, 2008).

In 2009, he began starring on the CBS police procedural NCIS: Los Angeles. The show ran for 14 seasons and is a spin-off of NCIS, which itself is a spin-off of the naval legal drama JAG. LL Cool J portrayed NCIS Special Agent Sam Hanna, an ex–Navy SEAL who is fluent in Arabic and is an expert on West Asian culture. The series debuted in autumn of 2009, but the characters were introduced in an April 2009 crossover episode on the parent show. In 2013, LL received a Teen Choice Award for Choice TV Actor: Action for his work on the program. In May 2023, following the series finale of NCIS: Los Angeles, it was announced that LL would reprise the role of Sam Hanna as a recurring guest star in the third season of NCIS: Hawaiʻi. Since October 2026, Hanna has become the protagonist of a new spinoff NCIS: New York.

In December 2013, LL co-starred as a gym owner in the sports dramedy Grudge Match. From 2015 to 2019, LL hosted the show Lip Sync Battle. He was also cast to play Beth's father in Neighbors 2: Sorority Rising, as shown in a trailer for the film, but his scenes were cut from the final product.

== Other ventures ==
LL Cool J worked behind the scenes with the mid-1980s hip-hop sportswear line TROOP. He also launched a clothing line (called "Todd Smith"). The brand produced popular urban apparel. Designs included influences from LL's lyrics and tattoos, as well as from other icons in the hip-hop community. LL Cool J has written four books, including I Make My Own Rules, (1997), an autobiography cowritten with Karen Hunter. His second book was the children-oriented book called And the Winner Is... published in 2002. In 2006, LL Cool J and his personal trainer, Dave "Scooter" Honig, wrote a fitness book titled The Platinum Workout. His fourth book, LL Cool J (Hip-Hop Stars) was cowritten in 2007 with hip-hop historian Dustin Shekell and Public Enemy's Chuck D.

Throughout his career, LL Cool J has started several businesses in the music industry. In 1993, he founded a music label called P.O.G. (Power Of God) and formed the company Rock The Bells to produce music. On his Rock The Bells label, he had artists such as AMyth, Smokeman, Natice, Chantel Jones and Simone Starks. Additionally, Rock the Bells Records was responsible for the Deep Blue Sea soundtrack, which helped to promote the 1999 movie of the same name. Rufus "Scola" Waller also signed to the label, but was ultimately released when the label folded. LL Cool J founded and launched Boomdizzle.com, a record label / social networking site, in September 2008. The website was designed to accept music uploads from aspiring artists, primarily from the hip-hop genre, and allow the site's users to rate songs through contests, voting, and other community events.

In March 2015, LL Cool J appeared in an introduction to WrestleMania 31.

== Influences and honors ==
Radio's release coincided with the growing new school scene and subculture, which also marked the beginning of hip-hop's "golden age" and the replacement of old-school hip-hop. This period of hip-hop was marked by the end of the disco rap stylings of old-school, which had flourished prior to the mid-1980s, and the rise of a new style featuring "ghetto blasters". Radio served as one of the earliest records, along with Run-D.M.C.'s debut album, to combine the vocal approach of hip-hop and rapping with the musical arrangements and riffing sound of rock music, pioneering the rap rock hybrid sound.

The emerging new-school scene was initially characterized by drum machine-led minimalism, often tinged with elements of rock, as well as boasts about rapping delivered in an aggressive, self-assertive style. In image as in song, the artists projected a tough, cool, street b-boy attitude. These elements contrasted sharply with the 1970s P-Funk and disco-influenced outfits, live bands, synthesizers and party rhymes of acts prevalent in 1984, rendering them old school. In contrast to the lengthy, jam-like form predominant throughout early hip-hop ("King Tim III", "Rapper's Delight", "The Breaks"), new-school artists tended to compose shorter songs that would be more accessible and had potential for radio play, and conceived more cohesive LPs than their old-school counterparts; the style typified by LL Cool J's Radio. A leading example of the new school sound is the song "I Can't Live Without My Radio", a loud, defiant declaration of public loyalty to his boom box, which The New York Times described as "quintessential rap in its directness, immediacy and assertion of self". It was featured in the film Krush Groove (1985), which was based on the rise of Def Jam and new school acts such as Run-D.M.C. and the Fat Boys.

The energy and hardcore delivery and musical style of rapping featured on Radio, as well as other new-school recordings by artists such as Run-D.M.C., Schoolly D, T La Rock and Steady B, proved to be influential to hip-hop acts of the "golden age" such as Boogie Down Productions and Public Enemy. The decline of the old-school form of hip-hop also led to the closing of Sugar Hill Records, one of the labels that helped contribute to early hip-hop and that, coincidentally, rejected LL's demo tape. As the album served as an example of an expansion of hip-hop music's artistic possibilities, its commercial success and distinct sound soon led to an increase in multi-racial audiences and listeners, adding to the legacy of the album and hip-hop as well.

In 2017, LL Cool J became the first rapper to receive Kennedy Center Honors.

In 2021, he was inducted into the Rock and Roll Hall of Fame with an award for Musical Excellence.

== Personal life ==
=== Relationships ===
Smith dated Kidada Jones, daughter of producer Quincy Jones, from 1992 to 1994.

==== Marriage ====
He married Simone Johnson in 1995. The couple met in 1987 and have four children.

Simone Johnson-Smith was diagnosed with chondrosarcoma, a third-stage bone cancer, and was later cancer-free as of 2004. She became an entrepreneur, launching a jewelry line in 2011.

Smith is credited with introducing his wife to singer and close friend Mary J. Blige in 2005, inspiring their friendship; the women launched a collaborative jewelry line, Sister Love, in late 2020 after announcing it two years prior.

In 2023, the couple co-founded a jewelry line for men, Majesty.

=== Ancestry ===
In an episode of Finding Your Roots, Smith learned that his mother was adopted by Eugene Griffith and Ellen Hightower. The series' genetic genealogist CeCe Moore identified Smith's biological grandparents as Ethel Mae Jolly and Nathaniel Christy Lewis through analysis of his DNA. Smith's biological great-uncle was Hall of Fame boxer John Henry Lewis.

=== Political involvement ===
In 2002, LL Cool J supported George Pataki's bid for a third term as Governor of New York. In 2003, LL Cool J spoke at a U.S. Senate Committee hearing on the RIAA lawsuits against Americans distributing or downloading copyrighted music over peer-to-peer networks. He appeared to endorse the RIAA's position, claiming illegal file sharing was hurting his sales and that his session musicians "can't live" due to the lost income. Chuck D provided an opposing viewpoint, saying free file-sharing could be leveraged as a promotional tool and the industry was being overprotective of its copyright. LL also voiced his support for New York State Senator Malcolm Smith, a Democrat, during an appearance on the senator's local television show; LL worked with Smith in putting on the annual Jump and Ball Tournament in the rapper's childhood neighborhood of St. Albans, Queens. In a February 10, 2012, televised interview with CNN host Piers Morgan, LL Cool J expressed sympathy for President Barack Obama and ascribed negative impressions of his leadership to Republican obstruction designed to "make it look like you have a coordination problem." He was quick to add that no one "should assume that I'm a Democrat either. I'm an independent, you know?" In his 2010 book LL Cool J's Platinum 360 Diet and Lifestyle, he included Obama in a list of people he admired, stating that the then-president had "accomplished what people thought was impossible".

In 2025, LL Cool J cancelled his performance at the Welcome America Festival in Philadelphia, refusing to cross a picket line during the District Council 33 Strike.

=== Philanthropy ===
LL Cool J has his own charitable foundation called Jump & Ball, which is based in his hometown of Queens, New York, and offers an athletic and team-building program for young people. He is also involved in many charitable causes for literacy, music, and arts programs for kids and schools.

== Discography ==
Studio albums

- Radio (1985)
- Bigger and Deffer (1987)
- Walking with a Panther (1989)
- Mama Said Knock You Out (1990)
- 14 Shots to the Dome (1993)
- Mr. Smith (1995)
- Phenomenon (1997)
- G.O.A.T. (2000)
- 10 (2002)
- The DEFinition (2004)
- Todd Smith (2006)
- Exit 13 (2008)
- Authentic (2013)
- The FORCE (2024)

== Filmography ==
=== Film ===
Year	Title	Role	Notes
1985	Krush Groove	Himself	
1986	Wildcats	Rapper	
1991	The Hard Way	Detective Billy	
1992	Toys	Captain Patrick Zevo	
1995	Out-of-Sync	Jason St. Julian	
1995	Eyes on Hip Hop	Rapper	Video
1996	The Right to Remain Silent	Charles Red Taylor	TV movie
1997	Touch	Himself	
1997	B*A*P*S	Himself	
1998	Caught Up	Roger	
1998	Woo	Darryl	
1998	Halloween H20: 20 Years Later	Ronny Jones	
1999	Deep Blue Sea	Sherman "Preacher" Dudley	
1999	In Too Deep	Dwayne Keith "God" Gittens	
1999	Any Given Sunday	Julian "J-Man" Washington	
2000	Charlie's Angels	Mr. Jones	
2001	Kingdom Come	Ray Bud Slocumb	
2002	Rollerball	Marcus Ridley	
2003	Deliver Us from Eva	Ray Adams	
2003	S.W.A.T.	Officer Deacon "Deke" Kaye	
2004	Mindhunters	Gabe Jensen	
2005	Edison	Officer Rafe Deed	
2005	Slow Burn	Luther Pinks	
2006	Last Holiday	Sean Williams	
2007	The Man	Manny Baxter	TV movie
2008	The Deal	Bobby Mason	
2008	Drillbit Taylor	Himself	
2013	Grudge Match	Frankie Brite	
2023	A.k.a. Mr. Chow	Himself	

=== Television ===
Year	Title	Role	Notes
1986–89	American Bandstand	Himself/Musical Guest	Recurring Guest
1986–96	Soul Train	Himself/Musical Guest	Recurring Guest
1987–98	Showtime at the Apollo	Himself/Musical Guest	Recurring Guest
1987	Saturday Night Live	Himself/Musical Guest	Episode: "Sean Penn/L.L. Cool J/The Pull"
1988	Remote Control	Himself	Episode: "MTV Celebrity Episode"
1991	MTV Unplugged	Himself	Episode: "Yo! MTV Rap Unplugged"
1991	In Living Color	Himself/Musical Guest	Episode: "Anton and the Reporter"
1994	The Adventures of Pete & Pete	Mr. Throneberry	Episode: "Sick Day"
1995	Wheel of Fortune	Himself/Celebrity Contestant	Episode: "Celebrity Award Winners: Game 3"
1995–99	In the House	Marion Hill	Main Cast
1995–2004	Mad TV	Himself	Recurring Guest
1996	All That	Himself/Musical Guest	Episode: "Tia & Tamera Mowry/LL Cool J"
1996–97	Soul Train Music Awards	Himself/Co-Host	Main Co-Host
1997	Beavis and Butt-Head	Himself	Episode: "Beavis and Butt-Head Do Thanksgiving"
1998	Soul Train Lady of Soul Awards	Himself/Co-Host	Main Co-Host
1998	Oz	Jiggy Walker	Episode: "Strange Bedfellows"
1999–2000	Making the Video	Himself/Musical Guest	2 episodes
2000	Nickelodeon Kids' Choice Awards	Himself/Co-Host	Main Co-Host
2000	Behind the Music	Himself	Episode: "Run-DMC"
2001	American Music Awards	Himself/Co-Host	Main Co-Host
2001	The Challenge	Himself	Episode: "Rollerball Resurrection"
2001	Intimate Portrait	Himself	Episode: "Kim Fields"
2002	WWE SmackDown	Himself	Episode: "Entertainment Meets Sports Entertainment"
2003–04	Top of the Pops	Himself/Musical Guest	Recurring Guest
2004	American Casino	Himself	Episode: "LL Cool J Concert"
2004	Behind the Music	Himself	Episode: "LL Cool J"
2005	American Idol	Himself/Guest Judge	Episode: "Auditions: Cleveland & Orlando"
2005	House	Clarence	Episode: "Acceptance"
2006	E! True Hollywood Story	Himself	Episode: "Hip Hop Wifes"
2006	Biography	Himself	Episode: "LL Cool J"
2007	NAACP Image Awards	Himself/Host	Main Host
2007	30 Rock	Ridikolus	Episode: "The Source Awards"
2008	So You Think You Can Dance	Himself/Musical Guest	Episode: "Results Show: Two Dancers Eliminated"
2008	Sesame Street	Himself	Episode: "Telly the Tiebreaker"
2008	Project Runway	Himself/Guest Judge	Episode: "Rock N' Runway"
2008	The Greatest	Himself	Episode: "100 Greatest Hip Hop Songs"
2009	Fashion Police	Himself/Host	Episode: "The 2009 Grammy Awards"
2009	Kathy Griffin: My Life on the D-List	Himself	Episode: "I Heart Lily Tomlin"
2009	WWII in HD	Shelby Westbrook (voice)	Episode: "Striking Distance"
2009, 2023, 2025, 2026	NCIS	Special Agent Sam Hanna	6 episodes
2009–23	NCIS: Los Angeles	Special Agent Sam Hanna	Main Cast
2010	The Electric Company	Himself	2 episodes
2012	Bizarre Foods America	Himself	Episode: "Las Vegas"
2012	Hawaii Five-0	Special Agent Sam Hanna	Episode: "Pa Make Loa"
2012–16	Grammy Awards	Himself/Host	Main Host
2014	Foo Fighters: Sonic Highways	Himself	Episode: "New York"
2015	In Their Own Words	Himself	Episode: "Muhammad Ali"
2015–19	Lip Sync Battle	Himself/Host	Main Host
2016	Finding Your Roots	Himself	Episode: "Family Reunions"
2016	Greatest Hits	Himself	Episode: "Greatest Hits: 1995–2000"
2016	Hip-Hop Evolution	Himself	Main Guest: Season 1
2017	Pyramid	Himself/Celebrity Player	Episode: "Leslie Jones vs. LL Cool J and Tom Bergeron vs. Jennifer Nettles"
2017	Oprah's Master Class	Himself	Episode: "LL Cool J"
2017	Martha & Snoop's Potluck Dinner Party	Himself	Episode: "Let's Get Roasted"
2017	American Dad!	Special Agent Sam Hanna (voice)	Episode: "Casino Normale"
2018	Story of Cool	Himself/Narrator	Main Narrator
2018	Shut Up and Dribble	Himself	Episode: "102"
2019	Shangri-La	Himself	2 episodes
2019	Kennedy Center Honors	Himself/Host	Main Host
2021	Hip Hop Uncovered	Himself	Episode: "Victory Lap"
2022	iHeartRadio Music Awards	Himself/Host	Main Host
2022	They Call Me Magic	Himself	Episode: "Magic"
2022	Supreme Team	Himself	Main Guest
2023	Fight the Power: How Hip-Hop Changed the World	Himself	2 episodes
2023	America in Black	Himself	Episode: "LL Cool J, Black Land Reparations and The Shade Room"
2023	Superfan	Himself	Episode: "LL Cool J"
2023	Hip Hop Treasures	Himself	2 episodes
2023–24	NCIS: Hawaiʻi	Special Agent Sam Hanna	12 episodes
2026–present	NCIS: New York	Special Agent Sam Hanna	Main Cast

=== Documentary ===
Year	Title
1986	Big Fun in the Big Town
1990	RapMania: The Roots of Rap
1991	Desperately Seeking Roger
1995	The Show
2021	Mary J. Blige's My Life
2025	Stans

== Tours ==
- 1987 Def Jam Tour (1987)
- Nitro World Tour (1989–1990)
- Top Secret Tour (1996)

== Awards and nominations ==
=== Grammy Awards ===
Year	Nominated work	Award	Result	Ref
1989	"Going Back To Cali"	Best Rap Performance	Nominated	
1992	"Mama Said Knock You Out"	Best Rap Solo Performance	Won	
1993	"Strictly Business"	Best Rap Solo Performance	Nominated	
1994	"Stand By Your Man"	Best Rap Solo Performance	Nominated	
1997	"Hey Lover"	Best Rap Solo Performance	Won	
1997	Mr. Smith	Best Rap Album	Nominated	
1998	"Ain't Nobody"	Best Rap Solo Performance	Nominated	
2004	"Luv U Better"	Best Rap/Sung Collaboration	Nominated	
2005	The DEFinition	Best Rap Album	Nominated	

=== American Music Awards ===
Year	Nominated work	Award	Result
1988	Bigger & Deffer	Favorite R&B/Soul Album	Nominated
1988	LL Cool J	Favorite R&B/Soul Male Artist	Nominated
1992	LL Cool J	Favorite R&B/Soul Male Artist	Nominated

=== Billboard Music Awards ===
Year	Nominated work	Award	Result
1991	LL Cool J	No. 1 Rap Singles Artist	Won
1996	LL Cool J	Rap Artist of the Year	Won

==== MTV Video Music Awards ====
Year	Nominated work	Award	Result	Ref
1991	"Mama Said Knock You Out"	Best Rap Video	Won	
1991	"Mama Said Knock You Out"	Best Cinematography in a Video	Nominated	
1996	"Doin' It"	Best Rap Video	Nominated	
1997	Lifetime Achievement	Michael Jackson Video Vanguard Award	Won	

==== NAACP Image Awards ====
Year	Nominated work	Category	Result	Ref
1996	Mr. Smith	Best Rap Artist	Won	
1997	Phenomenon	Best Rap Artist	Won	
2001	G.O.A.T.	Outstanding Hip-Hop/Rap Artist	Won	
2003	10	Outstanding Male Artist	Won	

==== Soul Train Music Awards ====
Year	Nominated work	Category	Result	Ref
1987	Radio	Best Rap Album	Nominated	
1988	Bigger and Deffer	Best Rap Album	Won	
1988	"I Need Love"	Best Rap Single	Won	
1991	Mama Said Knock You Out	Best Rap Album	Nominated	
2003	10	Best R&B/Soul or Rap Album of the Year	Nominated	
2003	Outstanding Career Achievements in the Field of Entertainment	Quincy Jones Award	Won	
2005	"Headsprung"	Best R&B/Soul or Rap Dance Cut	Nominated	

==== Other honors and awards ====
- 1988 – Enstooled as Kwasi Achi-Bru, a chieftain of the Akan people, in Abidjan, Ivory Coast
- 1991 – Billboard Top Rap Singles Artist
- 1997 – Patrick Lippert Award, Rock The Vote
- 2003 – Source Foundation Image Award, for "his community work"
- 2007 – Long Island Music Hall of Fame, Inducted as part of the Inaugural Class of Inductees for his contribution to Long Island's rich musical heritage
- 2011 – BET Hip Hop Awards, Honored with the I Am Hip Hop Award for his contributions to hip-hop culture
- 2013 – A New York City double decker tour bus was dedicated to LL Cool J and his life's work
- 2014 – Honorary Doctor of Arts, Northeastern University, for his contributions to hip-hop culture
- 2016 – LL Cool J was awarded a star on the Hollywood Walk Of Fame.
- 2017 – first hip-hop artist to receive a Kennedy Center Honor
- LL Cool J has been nominated six times for induction into The Rock and Roll Hall Of Fame. He has been nominated in 2010, 2011, 2014, 2018, 2019, and 2021 as a performer. In 2021, He was inducted into The Rock and Roll Hall of Fame with an award for Musical Excellence.
- 2022 – Honored with the Key of the City of New York in the Queens borough

=== Acting ===
Year	Award	Category	Work	Result	Ref
1996	NAACP Image Awards	Outstanding Lead Actor in a Comedy Series	In the House	Nominated	
1997	Kids' Choice Awards	Favorite Television Actor	In the House	Nominated	
1998	NAACP Image Awards	Outstanding Lead Actor in a Comedy Series	In the House	Nominated	
2000	NAACP Image Awards	Outstanding Supporting Actor in a Motion Picture	Deep Blue Sea	Nominated	
2000	Blockbuster Entertainment Award	Favorite Supporting Actor – Action	Deep Blue Sea	Won	
2004	Black Reel Awards	Best Actor	Deliver Us from Eva	Nominated	
2006	Teen Choice Awards	Award for Choice Movie: Liplock (shared with Queen Latifah)	Last Holiday	Nominated	
2011	NAACP Image Awards	Outstanding Actor in a Drama Series	NCIS: Los Angeles	Won	
2011	Teen Choice Awards	Choice TV Actor: Action	NCIS: Los Angeles	Nominated	
2012	NAACP Image Awards	Outstanding Actor in a Drama Series	NCIS: Los Angeles	Won	
2012	Teen Choice Awards	Choice TV Actor: Action	NCIS: Los Angeles	Nominated	
2012	Primetime Emmy Awards	Outstanding Special Class Programs	The 54th Annual Grammy Awards	Nominated	
2013	NAACP Image Awards	Outstanding Actor in a Drama Series	NCIS: Los Angeles	Won	
2013	Teen Choice Awards	Choice TV Actor: Action	NCIS: Los Angeles	Won	
2014	NAACP Image Awards	Outstanding Actor in a Drama Series	NCIS: Los Angeles	Won	
2014	Prism Awards	Male Performance in a Drama Series Multi-Episode Storyline	NCIS: Los Angeles	Nominated	
2015	NAACP Image Awards	Outstanding Actor in a Drama Series	NCIS: Los Angeles	Nominated	
2016	NAACP Image Awards	Outstanding Actor in a Drama Series	NCIS: Los Angeles	Nominated	
2016	Primetime Emmy Awards	Outstanding Structured Reality Program	Lip Sync Battle	Nominated	
2016	People's Choice Awards	Favorite TV Crime Drama Actor	NCIS: Los Angeles	Nominated	
2017	People's Choice Awards	Favorite TV Crime Drama Actor	NCIS: Los Angeles	Nominated	
