= Total discography =

- Studio albums: 2
- Singles: 8
- Music videos: 10

This is the discography of R&B/hip hop soul trio, Total.

== Albums ==
=== Studio albums ===
Year	Album details	Peak chart positions			Certifications
Year	Album details	US	US R&B	CAN	Certifications
1996	Total: Release date: January 30, 1996; Label: Bad Boy	23	4	28	RIAA: Platinum
1998	Kima, Keisha, and Pam: Release date: October 27, 1998; Label: Bad Boy	39	9	86	RIAA: Gold

== Singles ==
Year	Title	Peak chart positions				Certifications	Album
Year	Title	US	US R&B	NZ	UK	Certifications	Album
1995	"Can't You See" (featuring The Notorious B.I.G.)	13	3	41	43	RIAA: Gold	Total
1995	"No One Else" (featuring Da Brat)	22	4	—	—	RIAA: Gold	Total
1996	"Do You Know" ^{[A]}	—	62	—	—		Total
1996	"Kissin' You"	12	6	31	29	RIAA: Gold	Total
1996	"Do You Think About Us"	61	20	40	49		Total
1996	"When Boy Meets Girl"	50	28	—	—		Total
1997	"What About Us?" (featuring Timbaland & Missy Elliott)	16	4	48	—	RIAA: Gold	Soul Food
1998	"Trippin'" (featuring Missy Elliott)	7	3	—	—	RIAA: Gold	Kima, Keisha, and Pam
1999	"Sitting Home"	42	10	—	—		Kima, Keisha, and Pam
1999	"I Tried"	—	77	—	—		Kima, Keisha, and Pam
"—" denotes a recording that did not chart or was not released in that territory.

Notes

- ^{A} Did not chart on the Hot R&B/Hip-Hop Songs chart (Billboard rules at the time prevented album cuts from charting). Chart peak listed represents the Hot R&B/Hip-Hop Airplay chart.

=== Featured singles ===
Year	Single	Artist	Peak chart positions				Certifications	Album
Year	Single	Artist	US	US R&B	NZ	UK	Certifications	Album
1996	"Loungin"	LL Cool J	3	4	11	7	RIAA: Platinum	Mr. Smith
1997	"What You Want"	Mase	6	3	5	15	RIAA: Gold; RMNZ: Platinum	Harlem World
1999	"I Can't"	Foxy Brown	—	61	—	—		Chyna Doll
1999	"Discipline"	Gang Starr	—	58	—	—		Full Clip: A Decade of Gang Starr
2000	"I Wonder Why (He's the Greatest DJ)"	Tony Touch	—	52	—	68		The Piece Maker
2001	"Give It to Me"	Mad Lion	—	96	—	—		Predatah or Prey
"—" denotes a recording that did not chart or was not released in that territory.

== Guest appearances ==
Year	Title	Artist(s)	Album	Notes
1994	"Juicy"	Notorious B.I.G.	Ready to Die	Backing Vocals only
1994	"One More Chance [Hip Hop Mix]"	Notorious B.I.G.	Ready to Die	
1996	"You Don't Have to Worry"	Tevin Campbell	Back to the World	Co-written by Total
1996	"Loungin (Who Do Ya Luv) [Remix]"	LL Cool J	Non-album single	
1997	"Hypnotize"	Notorious B.I.G.	Life After Death	Backing vocals by Pamela Long
1997	"Not Tonight (Ladies Night Remix)"	Lil' Kim, Left Eye, Da Brat, Missy Elliott and Angie Martinez	Nothing to Lose (soundtrack)	Backing Vocals only
1998	"Too Fly"	MC Lyte	Seven & Seven	Featuring Pamela Long
1998	"What the Dealio?"	Missy Elliott	Why Do Fools Fall in Love (soundtrack)	
1998	"Monifah's Anthem / Bad Girl"	Monifah	Mo'hogany	Backing vocals by Pamela Long
1998	"Monifah's Anthem / Bad Girl II"	Monifah	Mo'hogany	Backing vocals by Pamela Long
1999	"Stay Out of My Way"	Mase	Double Up	
1999	"Dolly Baby"	Lil' Cease	The Wonderful World of Cease A Leo	Samples Pamela Longs's vocals from Total's "Truth Or Dare (Interlude)"
2000	"Crave"	—N/a	3 Strikes (soundtrack)	
2000	"Take Me"	Trina	Da Baddest Bitch	Featuring and Co-written by Pamela Long
2000	"Do You See"	Sauce Money, Puff Daddy	Middle Finger U	Backing vocals by Pamela Long
2000	"Quick Rush"	Missy Elliott	Bait (soundtrack)	
2001	"Oh No"	DJ Yutaka	United Nations II	Featuring Keisha Spivey and Pamela Long
2001	"Anti-Love Movement"	Da Beatminerz, Talib Kweli	Brace 4 Impak	

== Soundtracks ==
Year	Song	Album
1995	"Can't U See"	New Jersey Drive, Vol. 1
1997	"What About Us?"	Soul Food
1998	"What the Dealio" (with Missy Elliott)	Why Do Fools Fall in Love
2000	"Crave"	3 Strikes
2000	"Quick Rush" (with Missy Elliott)	Bait

== Videography ==
- From Total (1996)
  - No One Else
  - No One Else (Puff Daddy Remix)
  - Kissin' You
  - Kissin' You / Oh Honey
  - Can't You See
  - Can't You See (Bad Boy Remix)
- From Kima, Keisha, and Pam (1998)
  - Trippin'
  - Sitting Home
- From Soul Food (soundtrack) (1997)
  - What About Us? (1997)
- As Guest Artists
  - LL Cool J - Loungin' (Who Do U Love?) (1995)
  - The Notorious B.I.G. - "Hypnotize" (Pam) (1997)
  - The Notorious B.I.G. - "Juicy" (Keisha & Kima) (1994)
  - Mase - What You Want (1997)
  - Foxy Brown - I Can't (1998)
  - Tony Touch - I Wonder Why (He's The Greatest DJ) (2000)
