= I Shot Ya =

1995 song by LL Cool J featuring Keith Murray, Prodigy, Fat Joe, and Foxy Brown

Song by LL Cool J featuring Keith Murray, Prodigy, Fat Joe, and Foxy Brown

from the album Mr. Smith
- A-side: "Hey Lover"
- Released: October 31, 1995
- Recorded: 1995
- Studio: Chung King Studios
- Genre: East Coast hip-hop, hip hop, Hardcore Hip Hop gangsta rap
- Label: Def Jam; PolyGram
- Songwriters: Keith Murray; Prodigy; Fat Joe; Foxy Brown; LL Cool J
- Producer: Trackmasters

Music video
- "I Shot Ya (remix)" on YouTube

"I Shot Ya" is a song by American rapper LL Cool J featuring Keith Murray, from his sixth album Mr. Smith. The remix version, which featured Prodigy of Mobb Deep, Fat Joe, and Foxy Brown, of the song was released as a B-side to "Hey Lover", but received a video directed by Hype Williams, leading some to believe the track was an actual single from the album. Produced by Trackmasters, the remix was released in 1995 for Def Jam Recordings, and peaked at number 55 on the Hot R&B/Hip-Hop Songs for the Billboard charts.

== Background ==
The song was recorded at Chung King Studios, and both versions were created from a sample of "Put it on the Line" by singer Lyn Collins. In an interview with the Trackmasters, the beat was originally meant for The Notorious B.I.G. However, the beat was given to LL Cool J at the insistence of Chris Lighty, who was the manager of Fat Joe at the time. The original version contains three verses from LL and with the chorus provided by Murray, while the remix version was given new verses written and recorded at separate times by LL, Murray, Prodigy, Fat Joe, and Foxy Brown. While LL and the Trackmasters were working on the song, Fat Joe happened to be in another room one day, writing lyrics for his second album Jealous One's Envy. Being managed by Chris Lighty played a part in Joe being able to contribute a verse to the remix version.

Prodigy, who also happened to be at Chung King Studios at some point, was writing rhymes in another room before being asked to contribute a verse. Foxy Brown, then being an up-and-coming artist, would be the last contributor to the record. Brown was secretly brought into the studio by Trackmasters, adding her verse after the song sessions were finished, without LL having any knowledge about her beforehand. Upon hearing her verse for the first time, LL assumed that Tone & Poke had a little boy to contribute a verse to his record. However, he was impressed when he was told that it was actually a young woman who contributed the verse.

Both the original and remix versions are braggadocious responses from LL to people who doubted his musical and rhyming abilities, which followed the commercial disappointments of several past releases. Despite the East Coast/West Coast beef that was prominent at the time, none of the artists on the record were taking lyrical shots at Tupac Shakur. However, LL did take a lyrical aim at Kool Moe Dee, MC Hammer, and Ice-T, claiming that he emerged triumphant against all three with "To da Break of Dawn", a single that was released from his fourth album Mama Said Knock You Out. The song is also an alleged response to a fallen business deal that was proposed by Puff Daddy, which was to include him doing a remix to The Notorious B.I.G.’s "Who Shot Ya."

== Reception and legacy ==
Despite not being successful or recognized as an actual single, as the case with "Hey Lover", "Doin' It", and "Loungin", the remix version became notable for several reasons. The track was the musical debut of rapper Foxy Brown. The attention brought to her appearing on the record is what led to Trackmasters getting her a deal with Def Jam. The song is also notable for being one of the first-ever hip-hop songs to mention and reference the Illuminati, as well as the existence of secret societies—courtesy of Prodigy's verse. Fat Joe, who regards LL as his idol, considers the song to be a career highlight for him.

The song may also have somewhat fed the East Coast–West Coast hip-hop rivalry. Tupac Shakur, infamously shot in November 1994 when approaching a Times Square recording studio, was especially affronted by Biggie's February 1995 release of "Who Shot Ya?" and felt it disrespectful of LL to add "I Shot Ya." Sometime in the following year, Shakur confronted Keith Murray at the California House of Blues, wanting to know if the record was a diss to him. Upon questioning, Murray made it clear that the record was not about Shakur, and has continued to reiterate this in several interviews over the following years. Ironically, the record does feature a subliminal aim from Prodigy to Murray, continuing friction that started sometime prior with an interlude from Mobb Deep's 1995 The Infamous album. The rivalry continued until sometime in 2012, when the two ended their rivalry by taking a picture together.

LL Cool J stated in an Instagram post that he never had anything personal against MC Hammer, for he simply saw their rivalry as part of the fun and overall competitive nature of hip hop, but that he felt that Hammer had beef with him.

"I didn’t have a beef with M.C. Hammer. M.C. Hammer had a beef with me. And he knows I love him... That’s my man, and I love him. I think he just said my name [plus Run-DMC's and Doug E. Fresh's] in a record for attention. He did what he had to do. He came out and sold a lot of records and did his thing. But I never had any problems, personally, with Hammer. I lit him up ‘cause that’s what I was supposed to do. But I never had any problems with him at all. In terms of battles, I’ve had so many battles. So many artists have come at me from different directions and it just comes with the territory. That’s the fun part."

== Music video ==
The music video was released in December 1995.

== Charts ==
Chart (1995)	Peak position
U.S. Billboard Hot R&B/Hip-Hop Songs	55
