= Bad Boy Family Reunion Tour =

2016 concert tour by Bad Boy Entertainment

- Continental tour by Bad Boy Entertainment
- Location: North America
- Start date: August 25, 2016
- End date: October 8, 2016
- Legs: 1
- No. of shows: 21 in North America
- Website: Tour Website (Archived)

The Bad Boy Family Reunion Tour was a joint concert tour headlined by Puff Daddy and featured various past and present artists from Bad Boy Entertainment. The tour earned $117.5 million from 19 shows, selling 1,208,508 tickets. It was Diddy's final tour.

== Background ==
To commemorate the label's 20th anniversary, Combs reunited with his former and current Bad Boy Family artists at the 2015 BET Awards for an all-star medley performance of the collective's many hits along with a new single, "Finna Get Loose" (with a special appearance from Pharrell Williams).

In April 2016, Combs announced a two-night Bad Boy Family Reunion show on May 20 & 21 at the Barclays Center in Brooklyn, New York City, which was also in commemoration of the late Notorious B.I.G.'s 44th birthday. The first show included performances from Combs, Mase, Faith Evans, 112, Total, The Lox, Carl Thomas, Lil' Kim, French Montana, Mario Winans, Cassie, Black Rob, Lil' Cease and Red Cafe. Special guest performances included Jay-Z, Nas, Usher, Mary J. Blige and Rick Ross. The second night special guest included Busta Rhymes, Fabolous, Desiigner, 2 Milly, DMX and Ty Dolla Sign.

In May 2016, a full tour was announced to begin August 2016. However, Combs suffered a shoulder injury and the tour was pushed back to September 2016.

Speaking on the tour, Combs stated:

"This isn't just a concert—this is a moment in hip-hop and R&B history. The family and I are so excited to welcome fans into this once in a lifetime experience. This tour is 20 years in the making, and is a celebration of the hits and the Bad Boy lifestyle. The Bad Boy Family has set the standard for concert excellence, and this tour will be a testament to that!"

== Critical reception ==
The tour received critical praise during its tenure in North America. Jewel Wicker (The Atlanta Journal-Constitution) called the show in Atlanta "insanely fun". She goes on to say: "But for nearly three hours Diddy and the acts he helped to become famous put on a seemingly endless show full of the massive party anthems and sexy love songs that defined Bad Boy Records' reign. Referring to the concert as a 'homecoming' show, the flashy star emphasized from the beginning that he was rolling out the red carpet for 'his second home'".

The performance in Miami was compared to a family reunion cookout. Tony Centeno (Miami New Times) states: "It hasn't always been a smooth road for Bad Boy, but they've found a way to survive. And they've continued to heed the advice of Biggie's mother, Voletta Wallace, who once had a bit of advice for her son in the intro to 'Sky's The Limit'". The show in Tampa was described as "wholly unnecessary but welcomed". Jay Cridlin of the Tampa Bay Times says: "He ain't Drake, but his Family Reunion was a comprehensive retrospective of a generation's worth of signature singles, a two-plus-hour hit parade that reminded everyone just why he once owned the top of the pops. [...] No, Diddy doesn't really need the Bad Boy Family Reunion in 2016. But it's something only he could've pulled off. Sway like that, even money can't buy".

Maura Johnston of The Boston Globe states the show in Boston took patrons on a retro ride to the 90s. She continues: "The nostalgia baked into the tracks he opened the show with helped, too. As Puff Daddy, Combs strung together a slew of pop-rap hits that flipped radio chestnuts into tableaus for his and his friends' boasts, sounding bright in a way that recalls a sweltering summer day when time, space, and, yes, sound, melt into one another". The concert in Las Vegas received four out of five stars from the Las Vegas Weekly. Mike Pizzo writes: " Without a doubt, the Bad Boy Family Reunion Tour will go down in history as one of the greatest hip-hop concerts of all time. You may have hated him back then, but you can't hate him now".

== Performers ==
Main acts

- Puff Daddy
- Mase
- Faith Evans
- Lil' Kim
- 112
- Total
- The Lox
- Carl Thomas
- French Montana

Featured acts

- Mario Winans (select dates)
- DMX (Charlotte, Washington, D.C., Philadelphia, Boston, Newark, Oakland, Las Vegas, Inglewood)
- Christian Combs (select dates)
- Black Rob (select dates)

Special guests

- Brooklyn: Jay-Z, Nas, Usher, Mary J. Blige, Rick Ross, Cassie, Lil' Cease, Red Cafe, Busta Rhymes, Fabolous, Desiigner, 2 Milly, DMX, Ty Dolla Sign
- Chicago: Chance the Rapper, Jeremih
- New York City: Kanye West
- Atlanta: Yung Joc, Gorilla Zoe, Boyz n da Hood, Young Jeezy, 2 Chainz, Gucci Mane, Jodeci, Tyrese Gibson
- Miami: Kodak Black, Trina
- Houston: Bun B
- Philadelphia: Beanie Sigel
- Oakland: Shyne, Miguel
- Inglewood: Dr. Dre, Snoop Dogg, Nas, ASAP Rocky, ASAP Ferg, Jodeci, Mary J. Blige

== Setlist ==
The following setlist was obtained from the concert held on September 15, 2016, at the Toyota Center in Houston, Texas. It does not represent all concerts for the duration of the tour.

I—Puff Daddy

1. "Victory"
2. "O Let's Do It" (Remix)"
3. "Bad Boy for Life"
4. "Hate Me Now"
5. "I Get Money (Forbes 1,2,3 Remix)"

II—Puff Daddy & Mase

6. Can't Nobody Hold Me Down"
7. "Been Around the World"

III—112

8. "It's Over Now"
9. "Dance with Me"
10. "Peaches & Cream"
11. "Anywhere"

IV—Total

12. "Trippin'"
13. "No One Else"
14. "Tell Me"
15. "Kissin' You"

V—The Lox

16. "Mighty D-Block (2 Guns Up)"
17. "Last Day"
18. "We Gonna Make It" (performed by Jadakiss and Styles P)
19. "Good Times" (performed by Styles P)
20. "Wild Out"

VI—Carl Thomas

21. "Emotional"
22. "Summer Rain"
23. "I Wish"

VII—Faith Evans

24. "No Other Love"
25. "I Love You"
26. "You Gets No Love"
27. "NYC" (performed with Jadakiss)
28. "You Used to Love Me"
29. "Soon as I Get Home"

VIII—French Montana

29. "Hot Nigga (Remix)"
30. "No Shopping"
31. "Ain't Worried About Nothin'"
32. "Ocho Cinco"
33. "Same Damn Time (Remix)" (performed with Puff Daddy)
34. "Work (Remix)"
35. "Pop That"

IX—Lil' Kim

36. "Quiet Storm (Remix)"
37. "Big Momma Thang"
38. "No Time"
39. "Get Money"
40. "Lighters Up"

X—Various

36. "Feel So Good" (performed by Puff Daddy and Mase)
37. "I Need a Girl (Part One)" / "I Need a Girl (Part Two)" (performed by Puff Daddy)
38. "Cupid" (performed by 112)

XI—DMX

39. "What's My Name?"
40. "What These Bitches Want"
41. "Get at Me Dog"
42. "Ruff Ryders' Anthem"
43. "Party Up (Up in Here)"

XII—Bun B

44. "Draped Up"
45. "International Players Anthem (I Choose You)"

XIII—Finale

46. "Only You (Bad Boy Remix)" (performed by 112 and Mase)
47. "Can't You See" (performed by Total)
48. "Love Like This" (performed by Evans)
49. "Whoa!" (performed by Black Rob)
50. "All the Way Up" (performed by Montana)
51. "Wasting My Time" (performed by Christian Combs)
52. "It's All About the Benjamins" (performed by Puff Daddy, Jadakiss, Sheek Louch and Lil' Kim)
53. "I'll Be Missing You" (performed by(Puff Daddy, 112 and Faith Evans)
54. "Mo Money Mo Problems" (performed by Puff Daddy and Mase)

== Tour dates ==
Date	City	Country	Venue
Part I
May 20, 2016	Brooklyn	United States	Barclays Center
May 21, 2016	Brooklyn	United States	Barclays Center
Part II
September 1, 2016	Chicago	United States	United Center
September 2, 2016	Auburn Hills	United States	The Palace of Auburn Hills
September 3, 2016	Baltimore	United States	Royal Farms Arena
September 4, 2016	New York City	United States	Madison Square Garden
September 6, 2016	Toronto	Canada	Air Canada Centre
September 8, 2016	Atlanta	United States	Philips Arena
September 10, 2016	Miami	United States	American Airlines Arena
September 11, 2016	Tampa	United States	Amalie Arena
September 14, 2016	Dallas	United States	American Airlines Center
September 15, 2016	Houston	United States	Toyota Center
September 17, 2016	Cincinnati	United States	U.S. Bank Arena
September 20, 2016	Charlotte	United States	Time Warner Cable Arena
September 22, 2016	Washington, D.C.	United States	Verizon Center
September 23, 2016	Philadelphia	United States	Wells Fargo Center
September 24, 2016	Boston	United States	TD Garden
September 25, 2016	Newark	United States	Prudential Center
September 30, 2016	Oakland	United States	Oracle Arena
October 1, 2016	Las Vegas	United States	MGM Grand Garden Arena
October 4, 2016	Inglewood	United States	The Forum

Cancellations and rescheduled shows

August 25, 2016	Columbus, Ohio	Value City Arena	Cancelled
August 26, 2016	Cincinnati, Ohio	U.S. Bank Arena	Rescheduled to September 17, 2016
August 27, 2016	Chicago, Illinois	United Center	Rescheduled to September 1, 2016
August 31, 2016	Kansas City, Missouri	Sprint Center	Cancelled
September 16, 2016	San Antonio, Texas	AT&T Center	Cancelled
September 18, 2016	Nashville, Tennessee	Bridgestone Arena	Cancelled
October 2, 2016	Glendale, Arizona	Gila River Arena	Cancelled
October 6, 2016	San Diego, California	Viejas Arena	Cancelled
October 8, 2016	Oakland, California	Oracle Arena	Rescheduled to September 30, 2016

=== Box office score data ===
Venue	City	Tickets sold / Available	Gross revenue
Barclays Center	Brooklyn	29,366 / 29,366 (100%)	$4,203,021
Madison Square Garden	New York City	13,922 / 13,922 (100%)	$1,431,449
Air Canada Centre	Toronto	14,594 / 14,594 (100%)	$1,103,130
Philips Arena	Atlanta	13,563 / 13,563 (100%)	$1,139,318
American Airlines Center	Dallas	10,320 / 11,401 (90%)	$526,092
U.S. Bank Arena	Cincinnati	8,377 / 11,142 (75%)	$499,167
Time Warner Cable Arena	Charlotte	10,854 / 12,224 (89%)	$794,931
Verizon Center	Washington, D.C.	13,102 / 14,427 (91%)	$1,325,849
Wells Fargo Center	Philadelphia	16,899 / 16,899 (100%)	$1,353,781
TD Garden	Boston	11,122 / 12,254 (91%)	$955,143
Prudential Center	Newark	12,276 / 12,276 (100%)	$1,110,295
MGM Grand Garden Arena	Las Vegas	12,458 / 12,458 (100%)	$1,044,583
The Forum	Inglewood	14,185 / 14,185 (100%)	$1,314,634
TOTAL		181,038 / 188,711 (96%)	$16,801,393
