= The Way You Make Me Feel (disambiguation) =

"The Way You Make Me Feel" is a 1987 song by American singer Michael Jackson.

The Way You Make Me Feel or The Way U Make Me Feel may also refer to:

== Other songs ==
- "The Way You Make Me Feel" (Ronan Keating song), 2000
- "The Way You Make Me Feel", by Aleyce Simmonds and Paul Costa, 2007
- "The Way U Make Me Feel", by Black Eyed Peas from Behind the Front, 1998
- "The Way You Make Me Feel", by Eric Chou featuring Hsu Wei-ning from The Chaos After You, 2017
- "The Way You Make Me Feel", by Honeyz, B-side of from "Never Let You Down", 1999
- "Live Medley: The Way You Make Me Feel", by Joey Yung from Love Joey, 2001
- "The Way You Make Me Feel", by McFly from All the Greatest Hits, 2007
- "The Way You Make Me Feel", by Melba Moore from Melba, 1976
- "The Way You Make Me Feel", by Sandra Bernhard from Excuses for Bad Behavior, 1994
- "The Way You Make Me Feel", by Tara Kemp from Tara Kemp, 1991
- "The Way You Make Me Feel", by Terri & Monica from Systa, 1993
- "The Way You Make Me Feel", by Edsilia Rombley, 2019
- "The Way You Make Me Feel", by Jaqee, 2005
- "The Way You Make Me Feel", by Karen Mok, 1999
- "The Way You Make Me Feel", by Marc Rebillet with the Kount featuring Moods, 2021
- "The Way You Make Me Feel", by Ten City, 1994

== Other works ==
- The Way You Make Me Feel, a One on One episode, 2002
- The Way You Make Me Feel, a novel by Maurene Goo, 2018

== See also ==
- "I Close My Eyes and Count to Ten", a 1968 single by British singer Dusty Springfield (prominently featuring the line "It's the way you make me feel")
- "It's the Way You Make Me Feel", a 2001 song by the British band Steps
- Make Me Feel (disambiguation)
