= Impeach the President =

Single by The Honey Drippers
- B-side: "Roy C's Theme Song"
- Released: June 1, 1973
- Genre: Funk
- Length: 3:17
- Label: Alaga, Tuff City
- Songwriter: Roy Charles Hammond
- Producer: Roy C

"Impeach the President" is a song by funk band the Honey Drippers, written and produced by Roy Charles Hammond, known as Roy C. It was first released as a single on Alaga Records in 1973, and was re-released to iTunes by Tuff City Records in 2017, after being sampled hundreds of times since the mid-1980s. It is a protest song advocating the impeachment of then–U.S. President Richard Nixon. In the chorus, the band chants the song's title while Roy persuades them to stop. The B-side is "Roy C's Theme".

== Sampling history ==
According to Mark Katz, Marley Marl in 1986 "became the first hip-hop producer to sample and reconfigure a recorded drum break" when he used the drum break from "Impeach the President" as the instrumental basis for MC Shan's song "The Bridge".

In 1987, Audio Two used a two-second sample of "Impeach the President" on the song "Top Billin'".

Digital Underground sampled the song on "Flowin' on the D-Line" from their 1991 album Sons of the P.

In 1992, Tuff City Records sued Sony Music and Def Jam Records, alleging that samples of "Impeach the President" were used in L.L. Cool J's songs "Around the Way Girl" and "6 Minutes of Pleasure", as well as EPMD's "Give the People". In a commentary in Billboard magazine, Aaron Fuchs, president of Tuff City Records, stated that he charged a "low four-figure sum ... (three figures and less for indie labels)" to license "Impeach the President".

Digable Planets sampled the song in "Rebirth of Slick (Cool Like Dat)" in 1993.

A Sprite commercial in 1995 featured Large Professor and Grand Puba freestyling over the song's breakbeat.

The song was also sampled in Shaggy's song "Luv Me, Luv Me" (1998).

"Impeach the President" was among the samples used in Nas's song "I Can".

== See also ==
- "Let's Impeach the President", 2006 protest song advocating the impeachment of President George W. Bush by Neil Young
- "Synthetic Substitution", 1973 protest song by Melvin Bliss
