= To da Break of Dawn =

Single by LL Cool J

from the album Mama Said Knock You Out and House Party (soundtrack)
- B-side: "To da Break of Dawn (LP/instrumental)"
- Released: June 17, 1990
- Genre: East Coast hip-hop
- Length: 4:27
- Label: Def Jam; Motown
- Songwriters: James Smith; Marlon Williams
- Producer: Marley Marl

LL Cool J singles chronology
"Jingling Baby" (1990)	"To da Break of Dawn" (1990)	"The Boomin' System" (1990)

"To da Break of Dawn" is a single from both LL Cool J's fourth album, Mama Said Knock You Out, and the soundtrack to the Kid 'n Play movie House Party. The song was released on June 17, 1990, by Motown Records and Def Jam Recordings.

== Background ==
The song was a diss to LL's rivals at the time, Kool Moe Dee, MC Hammer, and Ice-T. Kool Moe Dee responded with the song "Death Blow" from his 1991 album Funke, Funke Wisdom. However, LL would reference the rivalry in the 1995 remix to I Shot Ya, a B-side from his sixth album Mr. Smith.

"To da Break of Dawn" was ranked #11 on XXL magazine's 2015 list of the top 20 diss songs of all time. The song peaked at #17 on the Hot Rap Singles chart. Additionally, the song's lyrics were sampled in other 1990's hip-hop songs, such as "No Vaseline" by Ice Cube, "Who's Gonna Take the Weight?" by Gang Starr, and "Partner to Swing" by Chino XL.

== Track listing ==
=== A-Side ===
1. "To Da Break Of Dawn" (Bug Out Mix)- 4:30
2. "To Da Break Of Dawn" (Remix Version)- 5:30

=== B-Side ===
1. "To Da Break Of Dawn" (LP Version)- 4:27
2. "To Da Break Of Dawn" (Instrumental)- 4:28

== Sampled in ==
"To da Break of Dawn" was sampled in several other songs following its release. These include:

- "No Vaseline" by Ice Cube
- "Check the Technique" by Gang Starr
- "Who's Gonna Take the Weight?" by Gang Starr
- "Love On My Mind" by Xscape
- "Partner to Swing" by Chino XL
