= No One Else =

1995 single by Total featuring Da Brat

Single by Total featuring Da Brat

from the album Total
- Released: November 28, 1995
- Recorded: 1995
- Genre: R&B; hip hop soul
- Length: 4:20
- Label: Bad Boy; Arista
- Songwriters: Shawntae Harris; Jean-Claude Olivier; Sean Combs; Terri Robinson
- Producers: Jean-Claude "Poke" Olivier; Sean "Puffy" Combs

Total singles chronology
"Can't You See?" (1995)	"No One Else" (1995)	"No One Else (Puff Daddy Remix)" (1996)

Da Brat singles chronology
"Give It 2 You" (1995)	"No One Else" (1995)	"No One Else (Puff Daddy Remix)" (1996)

Music video
- "No One Else" on YouTube

"No One Else" is a song by American girl group Total featuring American rapper Da Brat. It was released as the second single from Total's self-titled debut studio album on November 28, 1995, by Bad Boy and Arista Records. The song was produced by Bad Boy founder Sean "Puffy" Combs and Poke of the Trackmasters, while the songwriting was handled by the two alongside the featured Da Brat and Terri & Monica vocalist Terri Robinson. The song also contains a sample from the track "South Bronx" by Boogie Down Productions.

The track was a success, peaking at number twenty-two on the US Billboard Hot 100 and faring even better at on the Hot R&B/Hip-Hop Songs chart reaching number four.

The song was released with both the original and Puff Daddy (& Rodney Jerkins) Remix as prominent versions. Certain editions of the single only featured the remix and it even had its own music video. The track was based around rap verses from Foxy Brown and Lil' Kim, a new one from original featured artist Da Brat and a re-written chorus of "I don't need no one but you" by Total. The video version also had Puff Daddy recite lyrics from Sister Sledge's "We Are Family" (in reference to the Bad Boy Family) during the intro.

The mellow R&B Remix by another Bad Boy associate, producer Chucky Thompson was also included on certain editions of the single. There were slight lyrical differences on this mix including no rap, a spoken intro by Keisha, repositioning of the bridge and Keisha & Pam this time providing background vocals to their respective B-Sections.

== Music video ==
The original version features members of the group in several different outfits including one set resembling biker gear with background colours of white, red, green and gold. Shots from the video were used as promotional pictures for the "No One Else", "Kissin' You" and "What About Us?" singles and the groups' debut album. Da Brat makes an appearance rapping her contribution to the track in a scene with a white convertible car, green background and all artists dressed in white outfits. Director Hype Williams helmed this video.

== Puff Daddy Remix ==
"No One Else (Puff Daddy Remix)"

Single by Total featuring Foxy Brown, Lil' Kim and Da Brat

from the album Total
- Released: 1996
- Genre: R&B; hip hop soul
- Length: 4:35
- Label: Bad Boy; Arista
- Songwriters: Inga Marchand; Kimberly Jones; Shawntae Harris; Jean-Claude Olivier; Sean Combs; Terri Robinson
- Producers: Jean-Claude "Poke" Olivier; Sean "Puffy" Combs

Total singles chronology
"No One Else" (1995)	"No One Else (Puff Daddy Remix)" (1996)	"Kissin' You" (1996)

Foxy Brown singles chronology
"Hooked On You (Trackmasters Remix)" (1995)	"No One Else (Puff Daddy Remix)" (1996)	"Ain't No Nigga" (1996)

Lil' Kim singles chronology
"No One Else (Puff Daddy Remix)" (1996)	"No One Else" (1996)

Da Brat singles chronology
"No One Else" (1995)	"No One Else (Puff Daddy Remix)" (1996)	"Sittin' on Top of the World" (1996)

Music video
- "No One Else (Puff Daddy REMIX" on YouTube

The Puff Daddy Remix of "No One Else" features American rappers Foxy Brown, Lil' Kim and Da Brat, who already appeared on the original version of the track.

The remix is widely known as the only joint musical appearance of now-rivals Lil' Kim and Foxy Brown together, who were at the time, great friends.

=== Music video ===
The music video to the official remix slightly more concept based, with the women eventually arriving to rob a bank in a Mercedes-Benz car. The various artists appearing on the track also feature alongside Puff Daddy and the Notorious B.I.G. against a white background and playing poker. It is viewed completely in black and white and was to be the group's second of three single remix videos. (the other two being "Can't You See" and "Kissin' You")

== Trivia ==
- Producer Poke later re-used the KRS-One/Boogie Down Productions "South Bronx" sample when working as one half of the Trackmasters on Jennifer Lopez's 2002 single "Jenny from the Block". Lopez is also the other producer of the track, Sean "Puffy" Combs' former girlfriend.
- Although it was Puff Daddy who recited a small section of "We Are Family" on the "Puff Daddy Remix", Total later sang an interpretation of another Sister Sledge hit "He's the Greatest Dancer" while appearing on Tony Touch's single "(I Wonder Why) He's The Greatest DJ".

== Track listings ==
CD single (remix)

1. Puff Daddy remix
2. R&B remix
3. R&B remix instrumental
4. Puff Daddy remix instrumental

12" vinyl single (US)
Side 1

1. Club version
2. Club version 2
3. R&B mix

Side 2

1. Radio edit
2. Radio edit 2
3. Instrumental

12" vinyl single (remix)
Side 1

1. Puff Daddy remix
2. Puff Daddy remix 2
3. R&B remix instrumental

Side 2

1. Puff Daddy remix radio edit
2. R&B remix
3. Puff Daddy remix instrumental

== Charts ==
=== Weekly charts ===
Chart (1995–1996)	Peak position
UK Singles (OCC)	185
UK Dance (OCC) Remixes	27
UK Hip Hop/R&B (OCC) Remixes	25
US Billboard Hot 100	22
US Hot R&B/Hip-Hop Songs (Billboard)	4
US Maxi-Singles Sales (Billboard)	1
US Rhythmic (Billboard)	25

=== Year-end charts ===
Chart (1996)	Position
US Billboard Hot 100	87
US Hot R&B/Hip-Hop Songs (Billboard)	22
