= Make Me Feel =

Make Me Feel may refer to:

- "Make Me Feel" (Galantis and East & Young song), 2016
- "Make Me Feel" (Janelle Monáe song), 2018
- "Make Me Feel" (oskar med k song), 2025
- "Make Me Feel", a 2022 song by Joey Badass from 2000
- "Make Me Feel", a 2012 song by Michael Learns to Rock from Scandinavia

== See also ==
- "Make Me Feel Better"
- "Make Me Feel Good", Belters Only & Jazzy, 2021
- "It Makes Me Feel Good", 1976 album by Cilla Black
- "Makes Me Feel", 1994 song by Devotion
