= Total (Total album) =

Studio album by Total
- Released: February 13, 1996
- Genres: R&B; hip-hop soul
- Length: 56:44
- Labels: Bad Boy; Arista
- Producers: Rheji Burrell; Sean "Puffy" Combs; Chad Elliott; Vince Herbert; Stevie J.; Rodney Jerkins; The Neptunes; Poke; Raphael Saadiq; Rashad Smith; Chucky Thompson

Total chronology
Total (1996)	Kima, Keisha, and Pam (1998)

Singles from Total
- 1. "Can't You See" Released: March 27, 1995; 2. "No One Else" Released: November 28, 1995; 3. "Kissin' You" Released: April 15, 1996; 4. "Do You Think About Us" Released: October 7, 1996

Total is the debut album by American female R&B trio Total. It was released by Bad Boy Records and Arista Records on February 13, 1996, in the United States. Chiefly produced by Bad Boy head Sean "Puffy" Combs, the album peaked at number 23 on the US Billboard 200 and reached the top five of the US Top R&B/Hip-Hop Albums. Total was certified platinum by the Recording Industry Association of America (RIAA) and spawned the hit singles "Can't You See", "No One Else", "Kissin' You" and "Do You Think About Us"/"When Boy Meets Girl".

== Critical reception ==
Professional ratings
Review scores
Source	Rating
AllMusic	4/5 stars
Entertainment Weekly	A−
Los Angeles Times	1/4 stars
Muzik	3.5/5 stars

AllMusic senior editor Stephen Thomas Erlewine found that "while the album is simply too long to sustain the quality" of their previous "singles "Can't You See" and "No One Else," most of the record is filled with deep, seductive funk that follows through on the group's promise." Entertainment Weekly's Dimitri Ehrlich wrote that "with a buttery delivery and enough sass to kill an elephant, this trio of hip-hop/soul vixens gives TLC good cause to be frightened. Brimming with irresistibly funky loops and gritty grooves, the self-titled Total is a pleasure from start to finish. Rap assists from label mate The Notorious B.I.G. are the cherry on top." Connie Johnson from the Los Angeles Times felt that "the three singers themselves generate little heat. The vocals on the best cuts, 'Can't You See' and 'Do You Think About Us?,' mostly evoke Faith Evans and T-Boz of TLC. Except for the lasciviousness of 'Who Is This,' Total doesn't distinguish itself from other divas."

== Track listing ==
No.	Title	Writer(s)	Producer(s)	Length
1.	"Intro" (featuring Puff Daddy)		Chad Elliott	0:54
2.	"Do You Know"	Terri Robinson; Sean Combs; Rashad Smith	Combs; Rashad "Ringo" Smith	3:23
3.	"No One Else" (featuring Da Brat)	Robinson; Shawntae Harris; Jean-Claude Olivier; Combs	Poke; Combs	4:28
4.	"Whose Is It?" (Interlude)		Stevie J; Elliott; Combs	2:28
5.	"Kissin' You"	Julian Jackson; Raphael Saadiq; Janice Johnson; Brian James	Saadiq	4:42
6.	"Do You Think About Us"	Saadiq; Johnson	Saadiq	4:33
7.	"Definition of a Bad Girl" (Interlude)		Elliott; Combs	1:10
8.	"Can't You See" (featuring The Notorious B.I.G.)	Robinson; Mark South; Joe Howell; Combs; Christopher Wallace; Herb Middleton	Combs	4:41
9.	"Someone Like You"	Robinson; Chucky Thompson; Combs; Rashad Smith	Thompson; Combs; Smith	4:35
10.	"Tell Me"	Faith Evans; Keisha Spivey; Omar Epps; Vince Herbert; Rheji Burrell	Herbert; Burrell	4:37
11.	"Love Is All We Need"	Robinson; Thompson; Combs	Thompson; Combs	4:00
12.	"Don't Ever Change"	Robinson; Spivey; Thompson; Combs	Thompson; Combs	4:14
13.	"Spend Some Time"	Robinson; Lee Drakeford; Evans; Olivier; Combs	Poke; Combs	4:18
14.	"When Boy Meets Girl"	Tammy Lucas; Pharrell Williams; Chad Hugo; Quinnes Parker; Marvin Scandrick; Spivey; Pamela Long; Barry Gibb; Robin Gibb	The Neptunes; Combs	4:18
15.	"No One Else (Puff Daddy Remix)" (featuring Lil' Kim, Foxy Brown & Da Brat)	Robinson; Inga Marchand; Harris; Olivier; Combs	Rodney Jerkins; Combs	4:28
Total length:				56:44

Sample credits

- "Do You Know" contains a sample from "Same Beat (Part 1)" as performed by Fred Wesley and The J.B.'s.
- "No One Else" contains a sample from "South Bronx" as performed by KRS-1.
- "Can't You See" contains elements from "The Payback" as performed by James Brown.
- "Someone like You" contains a sample from "Save their Souls" as performed by Hamilton Bohannon.
- "Tell Me" contains a sample from "Help Somebody Please" as performed by The O'Jays.
- "Love Is All We Need" contains excerpts from "Atomic Dog" as performed by George Clinton.
- "Don't Ever Change" samples "Computer Love" as performed by Zapp.
- "Spend Some Time" contains a sample from "Love TKO" as performed by Teddy Pendergrass.
- "When Boy Meets Girl" incorporates re-recorded portions of "Love You Inside Out" as written and performed by The Bee Gees.

== Credits ==
- Charles "Prince Charles" Alexander – Flute, Mixing
- Eddie Alford – guitar
- Bob Brockman – mixing
- Gerry Brown – mixing
- Sean "Puffy" Combs – executive producer, producer, remixing, Voices
- Lane Craven – engineer
- Da Brat – rap
- Stephen Dent – engineer
- Chad "Dr. Ceuss" Elliott – producer
- Dan Evans – production coordination
- Guzman (Constance Hansen and Russell Peacock) – Photography
- Chad Hugo – producer
- Stevie J. – producer
- Julian Jackson – drums, engineer, keyboards, percussion, programming
- Rodney Jerkins – remixing
- D. Jones – vocals (Background)
- Steve Jordan – producer
- Paul Logus – engineer, mixing
- Pam Long – Voices
- Tammy Lucas – vocal producer
- Keith M. – vocals (Background)
- Tony Maserati – engineer, mixing
- Keenya Mauldin – Hair Stylist
- Alisha Melvin – Hair Stylist
- Herb Middleton – keyboards
- Nasheim Myrick – engineer
- Axel Niehaus – engineer, mixing
- Jean Claude "Poke" Olivier – producer
- Sybil Pennix – Assistant Producer, Stylist, Executive Producer
- Herb Powers – Mastering
- Terri Robinson – producer, vocals (Background)
- Raphael Saadiq – guitar (Bass), Producer, Vocals (Background)
- LaTrice Shaw – production coordination
- Rashad Smith – producer
- Eric Spearman – make-up
- Kevin Thomas – engineer
- Chucky Thompson – guitar, keyboards, producer
- Total – vocals (Background)
- Richard Travali – engineer
- Pharrell Williams – producer
- Doug Wilson – engineer

== Charts ==
=== Weekly charts ===
Chart (1996)	Peak position
Canada Top Albums/CDs (RPM)	28
UK Albums (Official Charts)	84
UK R&B Albums (Official Charts)	12
US Billboard 200	23
US Top R&B/Hip-Hop Albums (Billboard)	4

=== Year-end charts ===
Chart (1996)	Position
US Billboard 200	166
US Top R&B/Hip-Hop Albums (Billboard)	27

== Certifications ==
Region	Certification	Certified units/sales
United States (RIAA)	Platinum	1,000,000^{^}
^{^} Shipments figures based on certification alone.
