= When Boy Meets Girl =

When Boy Meets Girl may refer to:

- "When Boy Meets Girl" (Terri Clark song), 1995
- "When Boy Meets Girl" (Total song), 1996
