= Back Seat (of My Jeep) =

Single by LL Cool J

from the album 14 Shots to the Dome
- B-side: "Pink Cookies In a Plastic Bag Getting Crushed by Buildings"
- Released: June 1, 1993
- Recorded: 1992
- Genre: East Coast hip hop; new jack swing
- Length: 4:32
- Label: Def Jam; Columbia
- Songwriters: James Todd Smith; Quincy Jones III
- Producers: LL Cool J; QDIII

LL Cool J singles chronology
"How I'm Comin'" (1993)	"Back Seat (of My Jeep)" (1993)	"Pink Cookies In a Plastic Bag Getting Crushed by Buildings" (1993)

Music video
- "Back Seat (of My Jeep)" on YouTube

"Back Seat (of My Jeep)" is a song by American rapper, songwriter, record producer, and actor LL Cool J, released as a single on June 1, 1993, for Def Jam Recordings, taken from his fifth album, 14 Shots to the Dome (1993). It was produced and written by LL Cool J and QD III. The song samples a drum loop from The Detroit Emeralds 1973 song "You're Gettin' a Little Too Smart".

== Reception ==
"Back Seat (of My Jeep)" was the most successful single from the critical and commercially disappointing album; it made it to 42 on the Billboard Hot 100 and 24 on the Hot R&B/Hip-Hop songs. "Back Seat" was packed along with another single, "Pink Cookies In a Plastic Bag Getting Crushed by Buildings", which charted at a lower position (#96 Pop, #34 R&B).

The song was sampled in Monica's 1995 song "Don't Take It Personal (Just One of Dem Days)."

The music video for the single feature LL Cool J at a Drive-in theater (which closed in 1998) in Westbury, New York.

== Track listing ==
=== A-side ===
1. "Pink Cookies In a Plastic Bag Getting Crushed by Buildings" (LP Version)- 4:17
2. "Pink Cookies In a Plastic Bag Getting Crushed by Buildings" (Instrumental)- 4:12

=== B-side ===
1. "Pink Cookies In a Plastic Bag Getting Crushed by Buildings" (Remix)- 4:23
2. "Pink Cookies In a Plastic Bag Getting Crushed by Buildings" (Remix Instrumental)- 4:23
3. "Back Seat (Of My Jeep)"- 4:32

== Charts ==
Chart (1993)	Peak position
US Billboard Hot 100	42
US Hot R&B/Hip-Hop Songs (Billboard)	24
US Maxi-Singles Sales (Billboard) with "Pink Cookies In a Plastic Bag Getting Crushed by Buildings"	25
US Cash Box Top 100	50
