= Can't You See (Total song) =

Single by Total featuring The Notorious B.I.G.

from the album New Jersey Drive, Vol. 1 and Total
- Released: March 11, 1995
- Recorded: 1994
- Genre: R&B; hip hop soul
- Length: 4:54 (single version); 4:41 (album version)
- Label: Tommy Boy; Warner Bros.
- Songwriters: Terri Robinson; Christopher Wallace; Joseph Howell; Randal Ryan; Mark South
- Producer: Sean "Puffy" Combs

Total singles chronology
"Can't You See" (1995)	"No One Else" (1995)

The Notorious B.I.G. singles chronology
"Big Poppa" (1994)	"Can't You See" (1995)	"The Points" (1995)

Music video
- "Can't You See" on YouTube

"Can't You See" is a 1995 song by American R&B girl group Total, released as their debut single. The track was released from the New Jersey Drive soundtrack and also later appeared on their eponymous debut album. After making their recording debut on his tracks "Juicy", "One More Chance" and "One More Chance" (Hip Hop Remix)", The Notorious B.I.G. returned the favor with an intro rap verse to the song. The track was written and arranged by Terri & Monica's Terri Robinson, produced entirely by Sean "Puffy" Combs with instrumentation provided by associates Rashad Smith, Herb Middleton and Chucky Thompson and contains a sample from James Brown's "The Payback". The track was a success both on the mainstream US Billboard Hot 100 chart, reaching number thirteen and the Hot R&B/Hip-Hop Songs chart, where it made number three. The song also peaked at number forty-three on the UK Singles Chart, where it charted for two weeks.

The main edit to the track was the "Bad Boy Remix", which had the girls sing the original lyrics with a different vocal arrangement. The intro rap by The Notorious B.I.G. was replaced with one from Keith Murray and its own music video. The track also had inserts of the girls acting as callers to a request line asking for the song to be played, saying such things as "Hey, can you play that Total Remix?". The vocals from this edit were also used on the "So So Def Remix" by Jermaine Dupri. The only remixes using the original track were those from funky house producer E-Smoove.

Billboard named the song #28 on their list of 100 Greatest Girl Group Songs of All Time.

== Music video ==
Videos were filmed for both "Can't You See" and its "Bad Boy Remix".

The video for the original song was filmed on location at Bethesda Terrace in New York City's Central Park. The video begins with a Bad Boy Entertainment motto of "Besides every Bad Boy, there is a Bad Girl!". The Notorious B.I.G. and Puff Daddy appear in white attire in a large hall where lights flash on and off in the background. Total then appear in the same area wearing leather outfits (a shot of which was used for the back insert of their album) They are also shown on a flight of stone steps. Later the group appear on a podium dressed in white, this time with The Notorious B.I.G. behind them. On a higher podium sits Puff Daddy in a kingly manner. Shots of this scene were used for the single's cover. The video ends with the girls leaving up the steps and a reappearance of the Bad Boy motto from the beginning.

The remix video sees Keith Murray rapping in front of a car upon whose bonnet Redman sits. The girls are briefly shown sitting on a basketball hoop bobbing their heads as the scene switches back to Murray rapping. Throughout the rest of the video the girls stand on the basketball court in casual attire and perform their vocals and at one point the word "Remix" flashes across the screen. This was one of the group's three single remix videos, along with "No One Else" and "Kissin' You". Chris Webber makes a cameo appearance in the video.

== Track listings ==
CD single

1. Original Version
2. Bad Boy Remix – Radio Edit
3. So So Def Remix
4. Bad Boy Remix Extended – Clean
5. So So Def Remix Instrumental
6. E-Smoove's Funky Piano Edit
7. E-Smoove's Funky Piano Dub

12" vinyl single (UK)
Side 1

1. Vocal
2. Instrumental

Side 2

1. No Rap Vocal
2. TV track

12" vinyl single (US)
Side 1

1. Bad Boy Remix
2. So So Def Remix
3. Bad Boy Remix Instrumental
4. So So Def Remix Instrumental

Side 2

1. Original Version
2. Hard House Vocal Mix
3. Funky Piano Dub Mix

== Charts ==
=== Weekly charts ===
Chart (1995)	Peak position
New Zealand (Recorded Music NZ)	41
UK Singles (OCC)	43
UK Dance (OCC)	14
UK Hip Hop/R&B (OCC)	10
US Billboard Hot 100	13
US Hot R&B/Hip-Hop Songs (Billboard)	3
US Rhythmic Airplay (Billboard)	10

=== Year-end charts ===
Chart (1995)	Position
US Billboard Hot 100	66
US Hot R&B/Hip-Hop Songs (Billboard)	11

== Certifications ==
Region	Certification	Certified units/sales
United States (RIAA)	Gold	500,000^{^}
^{^} Shipments figures based on certification alone.
