= 14 Shots to the Dome =

Studio album by LL Cool J
- Released: March 30, 1993
- Recorded: 1992–1993
- Studio: Marley's House Of Hits (Chestnut Ridge, N.Y.); QDIII Soundlab (Los Angeles); Cove City Sound Studios (Long Island); Unique Recording Studios (New York City); Bobcat's House (Palmdale, Calif.); Encore Studio (Burbank, Calif.)
- Genre: Hip hop
- Length: 64:46
- Label: Def Jam; Columbia
- Producer: Andrew Zenable; Christopher Joseph Forte; DJ Bobcat; Marley Marl; Quincy Jones III

LL Cool J chronology
Mama Said Knock You Out (1990)	14 Shots to the Dome (1993)	Mr. Smith (1995)

Singles from 14 Shots to the Dome
- 1. "How I'm Comin'" Released: February 15, 1993; 2. "Pink Cookies In a Plastic Bag Getting Crushed by Buildings/Back Seat (of My Jeep)" Released: June 1, 1993; 3. "Stand By Your Man" Released: October 4, 1993

14 Shots to the Dome is the fifth studio album by American hip hop recording artist LL Cool J. It was released on March 30, 1993, via Def Jam Recordings. The recording sessions took place at Marley's House of Hits, at Cove City Sound Studios, and at Unique Recording Studios, in New York, and at QDIII Soundlab in Los Angeles, at Bobcat's House in Palmdale, and at Encore Studio, in Burbank. The album was produced by Marley Marl, DJ Bobcat, Quincy Jones III, Andrew Zenable, and Chris Forte. It features guest appearances by Lords of the Underground and Lieutenant Stitchie.

The album peaked at number five on the Billboard 200 and topped the Top R&B/Hip-Hop Albums chart. On June 2, 1993, it was certified Gold by the Recording Industry Association of America.

It spawned three charted singles: "How I'm Comin'", "Pink Cookies In a Plastic Bag Getting Crushed by Buildings" b/w "Back Seat (of My Jeep)" and "Stand By Your Man".

It is his first album following his hugely successful previous album 1990's Mama Said Knock You Out. Unlike that release, which saw him have success on his own terms, 14 Shots sees LL adopting the sound of his West Coast gangsta rap contemporaries, especially that of Ice Cube and Cypress Hill. Many fans saw this as a jarring departure, and the album met mixed critical and commercial response. The album's second single "Back Seat" would later be sampled by R&B artist Monica for her debut single "Don't Take It Personal" which became a major hit two years later.

== Critical reception ==
Professional ratings
Review scores
Source	Rating
AllMusic	3/5 stars
Calgary Herald	C+
Robert Christgau	B
Entertainment Weekly	A
RapReviews	5.5/10
Rolling Stone	2/5 stars
The Rolling Stone Album Guide	2.5/5 stars
Select	3/5 medals
The Source	3/5 stars

Robert Christgau stated: "Proof we didn't need that his talent is as phat as an elefant's phart and his brain is the size of a pea. Only it isn't his brain--it's his ability to comprehend contradiction. Like Michael Ivey, of all people, he flunked his follow-up because he can't figure out how to put success and rap together. Where Ivey (or the Basehead 'character,' ha ha) takes his dorky confusion out on women, L.L.'s sexism is love-man suave--his 'It's so relaxin' after a piece of pussy gets off in the back of his Jeep is a rare moment of grace. Instead he slings the gangsta metaphors and handgun memories in the vain hope that the guys hanging out by the check-cashing place will think he's hard. But from the look of the crotch he's grabbing in several photos, as of now he just ain't."

== Track listing ==
No.	Title	Writer(s)	Producer(s)	Length
1.	"How I'm Comin'"	James Todd Smith; Marlon Williams; James Brown	Marley Marl	5:05
2.	"Buckin' Em Down'"	J.T. Smith; Quincy Jones III	QD3	4:02
3.	"Stand by Your Man"	J.T. Smith; Williams; Bobby Ervin; Ricky Walters; Douglas Davis; Lesette Wilson; Meli'sa Morgan	Marley Marl	4:50
4.	"A Little Somethin'"	J.T. Smith; Williams; King Floyd	Marley Marl	4:26
5.	"Pink Cookies In a Plastic Bag Getting Crushed by Buildings"	J.T. Smith; Williams; David Porter	Marley Marl	4:17
6.	"Straight from Queens" (featuring Lt. Stitchie)	J.T. Smith; Cleve Laing; Williams; Fred Wesley; Brown; John Starks	Marley Marl	4:54
7.	"Funkadelic Relic"	J.T. Smith; Williams; Klaus Günter Neumann; Lincoln Chase	Marley Marl	3:55
8.	"All We Got Left Is the Beat"	J.T. Smith; Ervin; George Clinton; Frank Waddy; Garry Shider; Walter Morrison; William Collins	DJ Bobcat	4:37
9.	"(NFA) No Frontin' Allowed" (featuring Lords of the Underground)	J.T. Smith; AlTerick Wardrick; Dupré Kelly; Williams; Ray Smith; Tyrone Armstrong	Marley Marl	4:19
10.	"Back Seat (of My Jeep)"	J.T. Smith; Jones III	QD3	4:31
11.	"Soul Survivor"	J.T. Smith; Andrew Zenable; Christopher Joseph Forte; Jones III; Curtis Mayfield	Andrew Zenable; Chris Forte; QD3	4:38
12.	"Ain't No Stoppin' This"	J.T. Smith; Ervin; Tony Hester	DJ Bobcat	4:43
13.	"Diggy Down"	J.T. Smith; Ervin; M. Smith	DJ Bobcat	4:58
14.	"Crossroads"	J.T. Smith; Ervin	DJ Bobcat	5:29
Total length:				1:04:44

Sample credits

- Track 1 contains elements from "Hot Pants (I'm Coming, I'm Coming)" written by James Brown and performed by Bobby Byrd
- Track 3 contains samples from "Fool's Paradise" written by Lesette Wilson and Joyce Melissa Morgan and performed by Meli'sa Morgan and "La Di Da Di" written and performed by Slick Rick and Doug E. Fresh
- Track 4 contains elements from "Groove Me" written and performed by King Floyd
- Track 5 contains a sample from "Blind Alley" written and performed by David Porter
- Track 6 contains elements from "The Payback" written by James Brown, Fred Wesley and John Starks and performed by James Brown
- Track 7 embodies portions of the composition "Wonderland by Night" written by Klaus Günter Neumann and Lincoln Chase
- Track 8 contains samples from "Hollywood Squares" written by William Collins, Frank Waddy and George Clinton and performed by Bootsy's Rubber Band, and "One Nation Under a Groove" written by George Clinton, Garry Shider and Walter "Junie" Morrison and performed by Funkadelic
- Track 9 contains samples from "Get Up & Dance" courtesy of Malaco Records and "Horn Hits for DJs" under license from Tuff City Records
- Track 11 contains elements from "Mother's Son" written and performed by Curtis Mayfield
- Track 12 contains a sample from "Get Up Get Down" written by Tony Hester and performed by the Dramatics

== Personnel ==
- James Todd Smith – main artist
- Dawn Green – backing vocals (tracks: 1, 3)
- Cindy Mizelle – backing vocals (track 14)
- Marsha McClurkin – backing vocals (track 14)
- Mary Brown – backing vocals (track 14)
- Nicki Richards – backing vocals (track 14)
- Paulette McWilliams – backing vocals (track 14)
- Stan "The Guitar Man" Jones – bass & guitar (tracks: 8, 12, 13)
- Marlon "Marley Marl" Williams – producer (tracks: 1, 3–7, 9)
- Bobby "Bobcat" Ervin – producer (tracks: 8, 12–14), arranger (tracks: 8, 13), mixing (track 8)
- Quincy Delight Jones III – producer (tracks: 2, 10, 11), recording (tracks: 2, 10)
- Andrew Zenable – producer (track 11)
- Christopher Joseph Forte – producer (track 11)
- George Karras – engineering (tracks: 1–7, 9–11), mixing (tracks: 8, 12, 13), arranger (track 14)
- Frank Heller – engineering (tracks: 1, 3–7, 9)
- Dan Hetzel – recording (tracks: 8, 14)
- Steve Fredrickson – recording (tracks: 12, 13)
- Howie Weinberg – mastering
- Jeff Trotter – A&R executive
- Glen E. Friedman – photography
- Albert Watson – photography

== Charts ==
Chart (1993)	Peak position
Australian Albums (ARIA)	112
German Albums (Offizielle Top 100)	74
New Zealand Albums (RMNZ)	36
UK Albums (OCC)	74
US Billboard 200	5
US Top R&B/Hip-Hop Albums (Billboard)	1

== Certifications ==
Region	Certification	Certified units/sales
United States (RIAA)	Gold	500,000^{^}
^{^} Shipments figures based on certification alone.

== See also ==
- List of Billboard number-one R&B albums of 1993
