= Kima, Keisha, and Pam =

Kima, Keisha and Pam

Studio album by Total
- Released: October 27, 1998
- Genres: R&B; hip-hop soul
- Length: 68:13
- Labels: Bad Boy; Arista
- Producers: Garrett Blake; Sean "Puffy" Combs; Missy "Misdemeanor" Elliott; Heavy D; D-Dot; The Hitmen; Kris Kellow; Darryl Pearson; Harve Pierre; Stevie J; J-Dub; Chucky Thompson; Timbaland; Mario Winans

Total chronology
Total (1996)	Kima, Keisha and Pam (1998)

Singles from Kima, Keisha, and Pam
- 1. "Trippin'" Released: October 17, 1998; 2. "Sitting Home" Released: February 23, 1999; 3. "I Tried" Released: April 29, 1999

Kima, Keisha, and Pam is the second and last to date studio album by American R&B girl group Total. It was released by Bad Boy Records and Arista Records on October 27, 1998, in the United States. The album debuted at number nine on the US Top R&B/Hip-Hop Albums and peaked at number thirty-nine on the US Billboard 200. In 1999, the album was certified Gold by the Recording Industry Association of America (RIAA) for excess of selling 500,000 copies. To date, it is their most recent album.

== Background ==
Original producer of "Truth Or Dare (Interlude)," Mario Winans re-produced it as a full-length track "Dolly Baby" for rapper Lil' Cease's 1999 album "The Wonderful World of Cease-a-Leo", also using a sample of Pam's vocals from the Interlude as its chorus. Despite it being a sample, she is also listed under vocals in the album's credits.

== Critical reception ==
Professional ratings
Review scores
Source	Rating
Allmusic	3/5 stars
Entertainment Weekly	B
Rolling Stone	3/5 stars

In his review for Entertainment Weekly Matt Diehl wrote that "Total don’t get quite bad enough on their sophomore release, Kima, Keisha, and Pam. Despite all the heavy breathing, the diva trio’s pillow talk peters out. However, bed-board-bangin’ beats from Missy Elliott, Timbaland, Heavy D, and the Puff master himself turn this into a partial, if not total, bump-and-grind masterpiece." Allmusic editor Michael Gallucci found that "by inviting a who's-who roster into the tub with them [Total] are barely heard. Brimming with the sounds of the world around it, Kima, Keisha & Pam is a studio-powered album that loses its individuality while trying desperately to be a part of the streets and scene. The best track, "Trippin'," is an Elliott-produced slice of robotic R&B that combines the gals' sweet harmonies with state-of-the-soul-art studio savvy. But an album's worth of the sexy same unveils Total's ultimate limitations."

== Track listing ==
No.	Title	Writer(s)	Producer(s)	Length
1.	"Trippin'"	Elliott; Tim Mosley; Darryl Pearson; Mario Winans; Sean "Puffy" Combs	Elliott; Pearson; Timbaland^{[a]}; Winans^{[a]}; Combs^{[a]}	4:26
2.	"I Tried"	Elliott; Darryl "Day" Pearson; Jess Klein	Elliott; Pearson	4:34
3.	"Rock Track"	Elliott; Winans; Combs	Winans; Combs	3:39
4.	"Masturbation (Interlude)"	Combs; Winans	Winans	1:42
5.	"If You Want Me" (featuring Mase)	Mason Betha; Steven Jordan; Harve Pierre; Trevor Smith, Jr.; Jimmy Seals	Stevie J	4:37
6.	"Press Rewind" (featuring Carl Thomas)	Chauncey Steed; Curtis Mayfield; Daron Jones; Darryl Floyd; Jamaal Durham; Winans; Marvin Scandrick; Michael Keith; Pamela Long; Quinnes Parker; Combs; Terry Williams	Combs; Winans	4:26
7.	"Sitting Home"	Deric "D-Dot" Angelettie; Errol Johnson; Garrett Blake; Jack Knight; Kenny Whitehead	Angelettie; Blake	4:15
8.	"Truth or Dare (Interlude)"	Winans; Keisha Spivey	Winans	1:22
9.	"What About Us? (Remix)" (featuring Black Rob)	Combs; Elliott; Trevor Horn; Jordan; Malcolm McLaren; Robert Ross	Stevie J; Combs	4:03
10.	"There Will Be No #!*@ Tonight (Interlude)"	Elliott	Elliott	2:37
11.	"Do Something" (featuring Missy "Misdemeanor" Elliott & Mocha)	Elliott; Gerard Thomas; Donald Holmes	Elliott; Thomas^{[a]}; Holmes^{[a]}	4:30
12.	"Rain"	Combs; Jeffrey Walker; Kelly Price; Robert Kelly; Lonnie Liston Smith	J-Dub; Combs	4:01
13.	"I Tried (Interlude)"	Chucky Thompson; Jakima Raynor; Spivey; Long	Thompson	2:04
14.	"The Most Beautiful"	Dwight Myers; Charles Stepney; Gromyko Collins; Long; Richard Rudolf; Warryn Campbell	Heavy D; Collins^{[a]}; Campbell^{[a]}	4:19
15.	"I Don't Wanna"	Elliott; Thomas; Holmes	Elliott; Thomas^{[a]}; Holmes^{[a]}	5:04
16.	"Move Too Fast"	Elliott; James Johnson; Barry White; Pearson; Johnson; Manu Dibango; Tom Brock	Elliott; Pearson	3:44
17.	"Bet She Can't"	Elliott; Thomas; Holmes	Elliott; Thomas^{[a]}; Holmes^{[a]}	4:07
18.	"I Don't Wanna Smile"	Diane Warren; Kris Kellow	Kellow	4:43
Total length:				68:13

Notes

- ^{^a} denotes co-producer

Samples credits

- "If You Want Me" sampled "Put Your Hands Where My Eyes Can See" by Busta Rhymes, which sampled "Sweet Green Fields" By Seals and Crofts.
- "Press Rewind" sampled "Little Child, Runnin Wild" by Curtis Mayfield
- "Rain" sampled "A Garden of Peace" by Lonnie Liston Smith and "Dead Presidents" by Jay-Z
- "Sitting Home" sampled "Forget I Was a "G"" by Whitehead Bros.
- "What About Us" (Remix) sampled "Hobo Scratch" by Malcolm McLaren and World's Famous Supreme Team

== Credits ==
- Charles "Prince Charles" Alexander – Engineer
- Billy B. – Make-Up
- Ariel Borujow – Assistant Engineer
- Ali Boudris – Engineer, Guitar
- Warryn Campbell – Producer
- Drew Coleman – Engineer
- Sean "Puffy" Combs – Executive Producer, Producer
- Johnny Dangerous – Programming
- C.J. DeVillar – Engineer
- Tony Dofat – Engineer
- Jimmy Douglass – Mixing
- Missy Elliott – Associate Executive Producer, Performer, Producer, Vocal Arrangement, Vocals
- Rasheed Goodlowe – Assistant Engineer
- Mick Guzauski – Mixing
- Andy Haller – Assistant Engineer
- Heavy D – Producer
- Steve Jordan – Producer
- Garrett Blake Smith – Producer
- Kris Kello – Arranger, Keyboards, Producer, Programming, Vocals (Background)
- Jess Klein – Composer
- Jack Knight – Vocal Arrangement
- Shannon "Slam" Lawrence Engineer
- Paul Logus – Engineer, Mixing
- Mario Lucy – Engineer
- Mase – Performer
- Tony Maserati – Engineer, Mixing
- Michael McCoy – Engineer
- Mocha – Performer
- Lynn Montrose – Engineer
- Rob Murphy – Assistant Engineer
- Michael Patterson – Mixing
- Rob Paustian – Engineer
- Joe "Smilin' Joe" Perrera – Engineer, Mixing
- Harve Pierre – A&R, Associate Executive Producer, Producer, Vocal Producer
- Herb Powers – Mastering
- Ed Raso – Engineer
- Norman Jean Roy – Photography
- Tony Smalios – Engineer
- Erica Spivey – Vocals
- Aaron Sprague – Assistant Engineer
- Toni Swan – Hair Stylist
- Carl Thomas – Performer
- Gerard Thomas – Multi Instruments, Producer
- Carl Thompson – Producer
- Timbaland – Multi Instruments, Producer
- Total – Vocals, Vocals (Background)
- Diane Warren – Executive Producer
- Mario Winans – Producer
- Chad Wolfinabarger – Engineer

== Charts ==
=== Weekly charts ===
Chart (1998)	Peak position
Canada Top Albums/CDs (RPM)	86
Canadian R&B Albums (Nielsen SoundScan)	17
UK Albums (Official Charts)	157
UK R&B Albums (Official Charts)	18
US Billboard 200	39
US Top R&B/Hip-Hop Albums (Billboard)	9

=== Year-end charts ===
Chart (1999)	Position
US Top R&B/Hip-Hop Albums (Billboard)	62

== Certifications ==
Region	Certification	Certified units/sales
United States (RIAA)	Gold	500,000^{^}
^{^} Shipments figures based on certification alone.
