= Stand by Your Man (LL Cool J song) =

Single by LL Cool J

from the album 14 Shots to the Dome
- B-side: "Soul Survivor"
- Released: October 4, 1993
- Recorded: 1992
- Genre: East Coast hip hop; new jack swing
- Length: 4:50
- Label: Def Jam; Columbia
- Songwriter: James Todd Smith
- Producers: Marley Marl; LL Cool J

LL Cool J singles chronology
"Pink Cookies in a Plastic Bag Getting Crushed by Buildings" (1993)	"Stand by Your Man" (1993)	"Flava in Ya Ear (Remix)" (1994)

"Stand by Your Man" is a song by American rapper and actor LL Cool J, released as the final single from his fifth studio album, 14 Shots to the Dome (1993). It was released on October 4, 1993 by Def Jam Recordings, and was produced by Marley Marl and LL Cool J. "Stand By Your Man" had the least commercial success of the four singles, only making it to number 67 on the Hot R&B/Hip-Hop Singles & Tracks and 24 on the Hot Rap Tracks. The B-side was "Soul Survivor".

"Stand by Your Man" was nominated for the Grammy Award for Best Rap Solo Performance but lost to "Let Me Ride" by Dr. Dre.

== Track listing ==
=== A-side ===
1. "Stand By Your Man" (LP Version)- 4:50
2. "Stand By Your Man" (New Jack Street Mix)- 3:41
3. "Stand By Your Man" (New Jack Street Mix Instrumental)- 3:41

=== B-side ===
1. "Stand By Your Man" (Hip Hop Mix 2)- 3:50
2. "Stand By Your Man" (Hip Hop Mix 1)- 4:01
3. "Soul Survivor"- 4:42
4. "Stand By Your Man" (Accapella)- 3:39

== Charts ==
Chart (1993)	Peak position
US Hot R&B/Hip-Hop Singles & Tracks (Billboard)	67
US Hot Rap Tracks (Billboard)	24
US Maxi-Singles Sales (Billboard)	48
