= Pink Cookies In a Plastic Bag Getting Crushed by Buildings =

Single by LL Cool J

from the album 14 Shots to the Dome
- B-side: "Back Seat (of My Jeep)"
- Released: June 1, 1993
- Recorded: 1992
- Genre: East Coast hip hop; new jack swing
- Length: 4:17
- Label: Def Jam; Columbia
- Songwriters: James Todd Smith; Marlon Williams
- Producers: Marley Marl; Easy Mo Bee (Remix)

LL Cool J singles chronology
"Back Seat (of My Jeep)" (1993)	"Pink Cookies In a Plastic Bag Getting Crushed by Buildings" (1993)	"Stand by Your Man" (1993)

"Pink Cookies in a Plastic Bag Getting Crushed by Buildings" is a song by American hip-hop artist LL Cool J, released alongside "Back Seat (of My Jeep)" in June 1993, by Def Jam and Columbia Records, as the joint second single from his fifth studio album, 14 Shots to the Dome (1993). The original version was produced by Marley Marl, though the more popular remix was produced by Easy Mo Bee. The song reached No. 2 and 24 on the US Billboard Hot Rap Songs and Hot R&B Songs charts, and No. 50 on the US Cash Box Top 100. The accompanying music video was directed by Brett Ratner.

== Title ==
In a 2017 interview, 24 years after the song's release, LL Cool J claimed that its seemingly nonsensical title came to him at random during a phone call while under the influence of marijuana. However, in 2019, he tweeted that the title is actually a reference to both an anal sex-induced prolapse and the act of a man tossing a woman onto a bed during an orgasm: "Pink Cookies in a plastic bag is when you literally turn the 🍑 inside out. (looks like pink cookies lol) Getting 'crushed by buildings' is standing/carrying your (sex) partner then tossing them on the bed at the HEIGHT of the 'O'."

== Track listing ==
=== A-side ===
1. "Pink Cookies in a Plastic Bag Getting Crushed by Buildings" (LP version) – 4:17
2. "Pink Cookies in a Plastic Bag Getting Crushed by Buildings" (instrumental) – 4:12

=== B-side ===
1. "Pink Cookies in a Plastic Bag Getting Crushed by Buildings" (Remix) – 4:23
2. "Pink Cookies in a Plastic Bag Getting Crushed by Buildings" (Remix Instrumental) – 4:23
3. "Back Seat (Of My Jeep)" – 4:32

== Charts ==
Chart (1993)	Peak position
US Hot R&B Songs (Billboard)	24
US Hot Rap Songs (Billboard)	2
US Maxi-Singles Sales (Billboard)	25
US Cash Box Top 100	50
