= How I'm Comin' =

Single by LL Cool J

from the album 14 Shots to the Dome
- B-side: "Buckin' 'Em Down"
- Released: February 15, 1993
- Recorded: 1992
- Genre: East Coast hip hop
- Length: 5:04
- Label: Def Jam; Columbia
- Songwriters: James Todd Smith; QDIII
- Producers: Marley Marl; QD III; LL Cool J

LL Cool J singles chronology
"Why Me Baby?" (1992)	"How I'm Comin'" (1993)	"Back Seat (of My Jeep)" (1993)

"How I'm Comin'" is a song by LL Cool J, released as the first single from his fifth album, 14 Shots to the Dome. It was released on February 15, 1993 for Def Jam Recordings and featured production from Marley Marl, QDIII and LL Cool J. The drum loop in the song is sampled from "The Humpty Dance" by Digital Underground.

"How I'm Comin'" proved to be a minor success, making it to 1 on the Billboard Rap Tracks charts, 57 on the Billboard Hot 100. The song peaked at number 101 in Australia.

== Track listing ==
=== A-side ===
1. "How I'm Comin'" (LP Version)- 5:04
2. "How I'm Comin'" (Instrumental)- 52

=== B-side ===
1. "Buckin' Em Down" (LP Version)- 4:04
2. "Buckin' Em Down" (Instrumental)- 4:04

== Charts ==
Chart (1993)	Peak position
Australia (ARIA)	101
US Billboard Hot 100	57
US Hot Rap Tracks (Billboard)	1
US Maxi-Singles Sales (Billboard)	24

== See also ==
- List of Billboard number-one rap singles of the 1980s and 1990s
