= The Boomin' System =

Single by LL Cool J

from the album Mama Said Knock You Out
- B-side: "The Boomin' System" (remix)
- Released: August 7, 1990
- Genre: Golden age hip hop
- Length: 3:41
- Label: Def Jam; Columbia
- Songwriters: James Todd Smith; Marley Marl
- Producer: Marley Marl

LL Cool J singles chronology
"To da Break of Dawn" (1989)	"The Boomin' System" (1990)	"Around the Way Girl" (1990)

"The Boomin' System" is the first single released from American rapper LL Cool J's fourth album, Mama Said Knock You Out (1990). Produced by Marley Marl and co-produced by LL Cool J., it was released on August 2, 1990, by Def Jam Recordings. It was the first of the six singles released from the album and reached No. 37 and 48 on the US Cash Box Top 100 and Billboard Hot 100 charts, and No. 1 on the Billboard Hot Rap Singles chart. The song samples "The Payback" and "Funky Drummer" by James Brown and "Bring the Noise" by Public Enemy.

The single is the only way to obtain the original uncensored version of the song, as all album issues have the track with two lines ("Pass the Heineken" and "Roll up a fat one") edited out.

== Track listing ==
=== A-side ===
1. "The Boomin' System" (Radio 1) - 3:41
2. "The Boomin' System" (Radio 2) - 3:41

=== B-side ===
1. "The Boomin' System" (The Underground Mix) - 4:31

== Charts ==
Chart (1990)	Peak position
UK Singles (OCC)	83
US Billboard Hot 100	48
US Dance Club Songs (Billboard)	13
US Hot R&B/Hip-Hop Songs (Billboard)	6
US Hot Rap Songs (Billboard)	1
US Cash Box Top 100	37
