= Hey Lover =

1995 single by LL Cool J

Single by LL Cool J featuring Boyz II Men

from the album Mr. Smith
- B-side: "I Shot Ya" (remix)
- Released: October 31, 1995
- Studio: Stone Creek (Gladwyne, Pennsylvania)
- Genre: Hip hop; R&B
- Length: 4:46
- Label: Def Jam
- Songwriters: James Todd Smith; Rod Temperton
- Producer: Trackmasters

LL Cool J singles chronology
"Flava in Ya Ear" (remix) (1994)	"Hey Lover" (1995)	"Doin' It" (1996)

Boyz II Men singles chronology
"Brokenhearted" (1995)	"Hey Lover" (1995)	"One Sweet Day" (1995)

Music video
- "Hey Lover" on YouTube

"Hey Lover" is a song by American rapper and actor LL Cool J, released as the first single from his sixth album, Mr. Smith (1995). The song features vocals from American R&B group Boyz II Men. It was released on October 31, 1995, by Def Jam Recordings and was produced by The Trackmasters and LL Cool J. The song samples Michael Jackson's "The Lady in My Life" from his 1982 hit album Thriller; thus, Rod Temperton was given credit as a writer of this song. On the B-side is the "I Shot Ya" remix.

"Hey Lover" reached number three on both the US Billboard Hot 100 and Hot R&B Singles charts as well as on the US Cash Box Top 100. It sold 900,000 copies in 1995 and was certified platinum by the Recording Industry Association of America in January 1996 for selling one million copies. It also reached number 17 on the UK Singles Chart, number six in Sweden, and number five in New Zealand.

At the 1997 Grammy Awards, the song won a Grammy Award for Best Rap Solo Performance, becoming his second Grammy in that category after 1992's "Mama Said Knock You Out".

== Critical reception ==
Gil L. Robertson IV from Cash Box wrote, "What can I say? It's a definite number one single. After a short hiatus from the music industry to embark upon a promising film and television career, LL is back with an R&B based track which teams him with super-quartet Boyz II Men. Can you remember what 'I Need Love', did for the rap culture as a whole? Prior to that single's success a slow jam rap single was unheard of, yet LL pulled it off with a smooth style that was undeniable. This track brings to mind long days of hanging out at the malls, chasing girls. Thanks, LL, for the smooth reminiscence." In their review of Mr. Smith, Music & Media noted, "He adorns his love rap with sensual R&B vocals, especially strong on the first single 'Hey Lover'."

== Music video ==
The accompanying music video for "Hey Lover" was directed by American music video and film director, film producer, and screenwriter Hype Williams and was released on October 23, 1995. It featured television and film actress Gillian Iliana Waters as LL Cool J's love interest.

== Track listings ==
All versions of "Hey Lover" feature Boyz II Men, and all versions of "I Shot Ya" feature Prodigy, Keith Murray, Fat Joe, and Foxy Brown.

- US and Australian cassette single
1. "Hey Lover" (radio edit)
2. "Hey Lover" (instrumental)
- US 12-inch single

A1. "Hey Lover" (radio edit)
A2. "Hey Lover" (instrumental)
B1. "Hey Lover" (LP version)
B2. "Hey Lover" (a cappella)

- French CD single
1. "Hey Lover" (radio edit)
2. "I Shot Ya" (remix)
- UK and European CD single
1. "Hey Lover" (radio edit)
2. "Hey Lover" (instrumental)
3. "I Shot Ya" (remix)
4. "I Shot Ya" (LP version)
- Australasian CD single
1. "Hey Lover" (radio edit)
2. "Hey Lover" (instrumental)
3. "I Shot Ya" (remix)
4. "Hey Lover" (LP version)

== Charts ==
=== Weekly charts ===
Chart (1995–1996)	Peak position
Australia (ARIA)	11
Canada Top Singles (RPM)	50
Europe (Eurochart Hot 100)	43
Europe (European Dance Radio)	3
Europe (European Hit Radio)	31
France (SNEP)	27
France Airplay (SNEP)	40
Germany (GfK)	34
Iceland (Íslenski Listinn Topp 40)	20
Netherlands (Dutch Top 40)	12
Netherlands (Single Top 100)	12
New Zealand (Recorded Music NZ)	5
Scottish Singles Sales (Official Charts)	40
Sweden (Sverigetopplistan)	6
UK Singles (Official Charts)	17
UK Airplay (Music Week)	34
UK Club Chart (Music Week)	55
UK Dance (Official Charts)	12
UK Hip Hop/R&B (Official Charts)	2
US Billboard Hot 100	3
US Dance Singles Sales (Billboard)	3
US Hot R&B/Hip-Hop Songs (Billboard)	3
US Hot Rap Songs (Billboard)	1
US Rhythmic Airplay (Billboard)	2
US Cash Box Top 100	3

=== Year-end charts ===
Chart (1996)	Position
Australia (ARIA)	68
Sweden (Topplistan)	98
US Billboard Hot 100	20
US Hot R&B Singles (Billboard)	28
US Hot Rap Singles (Billboard)	10
US Top 40/Rhythm-Crossover (Billboard)	13

== Certifications ==
Region	Certification	Certified units/sales
United States (RIAA)	Platinum	1,000,000^{^}
^{^} Shipments figures based on certification alone.

== Release history ==
Region	Date	Format(s)	Label(s)	Ref.
United States	October 31, 1995	Rhythmic contemporary; contemporary hit radio	Def Jam	
Australia	January 8, 1996	CD; cassette	Def Jam; Mercury	
United Kingdom	January 8, 1996	12-inch vinyl; CD; cassette	Def Jam; Island	
Japan	January 15, 1996	CD	Def Jam	

== See also ==
- List of Billboard number-one rap singles of the 1980s and 1990s
