= Roy C =

American singer-songwriter (1939–2020)

- Born: Roy Charles Hammond; August 3, 1939; Newington, Georgia, U.S.
- Died: September 16, 2020 (aged 81) Allendale County, South Carolina, U.S.
- Genres: Soul, R&B
- Occupations: Singer writer, composer, producer
- Instrument: Vocals
- Formerly of: The Honey Drippers
- Website: roycmusic.com

Roy Charles Hammond (August 3, 1939 – September 16, 2020), better known as Roy C or Roy "C", was an American southern soul singer, songwriter and record executive, best known for his 1965 hit, "Shotgun Wedding". Another song, "Impeach the President", which he recorded and produced with a high school group, the Honey Drippers, has had one of the most sampled drum tracks in hip hop music.

== Life and career ==
Roy Hammond was born in Newington, Georgia. He began singing tenor with The Genies, a vocal group in Long Beach, Long Island, who were later offered a recording contract by record producer Bob Shad. Their first single, "Who's That Knockin'", reached number 72 on the Billboard Hot 100 chart in 1958, with Claude Johnson—later of the duo Don and Juan—on lead vocal. The group then moved to Atlantic Records, with Hammond taking over as lead singer, but their recordings were not released, and he was drafted into the Air Force.

=== Solo career and record labels ===
When he returned to New York City in 1965, Hammond organised a studio session to record his own song, "Shotgun Wedding", and released it under the name Roy Hammond on his own Hammond label, before leasing it to the larger Black Hawk Records under the name Roy C. The record, with its novelty ricochet opening and subject matter that was relatively risqué for the time, reached number 14 on the national Billboard R&B chart. It had even greater success when issued in the United Kingdom, reaching number 6 on the UK Singles Chart in 1966 and number 8 when reissued in 1972. His first album, That Shotgun Wedding Man, was released on Ember Records in 1966.

After some unsuccessful follow-ups on the Shout label, Hammond started another new label, Alaga. Working with guitarist J. Hines, he had more success with "Got to Get Enough (Of Your Sweet Love Stuff)" making the R&B chart in 1971. Two years later he signed with Mercury Records, and had another R&B hit with "Don't Blame the Man". He also released an album, Sex and Soul, and several more minor hit singles. He stayed with Mercury for several years, until label bosses took exception to his outspoken political stance in songs, including "Great Great Grandson of a Slave" from his 1977 album More Sex and More Soul.

Reviewing Sex and Soul in Christgau's Record Guide: Rock Albums of the Seventies (1981), Robert Christgau wrote, "Roy Hammond is a driven artist—he cut this in his garage—and his compulsiveness comes out in the lyrics; despite convincing asides about racism and Vietnam, his title ought to be Infidelity and Suffering. The songs are raw and outspoken, and the suffering's in the voice even more than the words—he strains its paradoxically mellow limits sometimes, so seekers after the Perfect Note should seek elsewhere. But old Swamp Dogg fans will put aside their feminist reservations and learn how the other half lives."

=== The Honey Drippers ===
In 1973, Hammond discovered a group of African-American high school students from Jamaica High School in Jamaica, Queens, named the Honey Drippers (not to be confused with Robert Plant's project of the same name), and decided to record some songs with them, which he released on his Alaga label. Most notable among the songs they recorded was "Impeach the President", a song advocating for the impeachment of President Richard Nixon due to the ongoing Watergate scandal and resulting impeachment process against Richard Nixon.

==== Sampling of "Impeach the President" ====
Pioneering hip hop producer Marley Marl used the drum intro from "Impeach the President" as the breakbeat for the 1985 song "The Bridge" by MC Shan. The opening drum sequence has since become one of the most widely used samples in hip hop. American rapper GZA makes a reference to the "Impeach the President" sample on his verse on "As High as Wu-Tang Get" by Wu-Tang Clan on the 1997 album Wu-Tang Forever, with the suggestion that the snare drum in the sample is easy to rap over. ("You can't flow, must be the speech impediment / You got lost off the snare off 'Impeach the President.'")

Hammond has occasionally been credited as a co-writer due to the sample, including on the hit Mary J. Blige song "Real Love", which samples the drum track from "Top Billin'" by Audio Two, which in turn uses a modified form of the drum intro from "Impeach the President". He is also credited for the 2011 Kanye West and Jay-Z song "Otis", which uses a line from "Top Billin'", and for the 2013 Frank Ocean song "Super Rich Kids", which interpolates the chorus of "Real Love". Neither "Otis" nor "Super Rich Kids" contain a sample from "Impeach the President".

=== Later career ===
From 1979, he continued to release a string of soul singles and albums, on his own Three Gems record label, initially based in New York and later in Allendale, South Carolina. Hammond wrote most of the songs that appear on his over 125 records. He recorded an album by ex-Temptation Dennis Edwards entitled Talk to Me, and also worked on a CD by Bobby Stringer. Hammond also ran his own record shop in Allendale, called Carolina Record Distributors.

"Infidelity, Georgia," also known as "Save by the Bell" or "Saved by the Bell," is a song about sexual infidelity in small town Georgia. Hammond released an album entitled Stella Lost Her Groove in March 1999.

== Discography ==
Singles

- "Mama Blow Your Top" - as Roy Hammond & The Genies (1959)
- "Dance Girl" (1965)
- "Shotgun Wedding" (1965)
- "I Want To Marry You" - under the name, "Little Frankie" (1966)
- "Stop What You're Doin'" (1966)
- "Twistin Pneumonia" (1966)
- "A Merry Black Xmas" (1970)
- "I Found a Man in My Bed" (1970)
- "In Divorce Court" (1970)
- "Got To Get Enough (Of Your Sweet Love Stuff)" (1971)
- "I Wasn't There" (1971)
- "I Caught You in The Act (Neighbourhood Scandal)" (1972)
- "I'm Gonna Love (Somebody Else's Woman)" (1972)
- "Since I Met You Baby" (with Linda Caver) (1972)
- "Don't Blame the Man" (1973)
- "She Kept on Walkin'" (1973)
- "The Wedding is Over" (1973)
- "We're On the Road to Hell" (1973)
- "If I Could Love You Forever" (1974)
- "Change Is Gonna Come" (1974)
- "My Girl" (Reggae) (1975)
- "Virgin Girl" (1975)
- "Every Woman Has a Right" (1976)
- "I Wanna Do It Again" (1976)
- "After Loving You" (1977)
- "After The Disco is Over (We Can Stop By a Motel)" (1980)
- "To Make You Feel Like a Woman" (1980)
- "You and I" (1981)
- "I Wish You Bad Luck" (1982)
- "Leaving on the Morning Train" (1982)
- "She's a Lady" (1986)
- "Country is My Name" (1986)
- "I'm Not Going to Eat a Thing" (1987)
- "Rock Me All Night" (1989)
- "634-5789" (1992)
- "I Want to Marry You" (1992)

Albums

- Roy "Shotgun Wedding" C (1966)
- Sex And Soul (1973)
- Something Nice (1975)
- More Sex & More Soul (1977)
- I Want To Be Where You Are (All Night Long) (1984)
- Let Me Take You To Paradise (1987)
- Rock Me All Night (1989)
- Call Me 634 ❤️ 5789 (1992)
- Sex Soul And The Street (1992)
- I'm Workin' Hard For You Baby (1998)
- Hey Mista (2005)

== See also ==
- List of soul musicians
