= Kissin' You =

1996 single by Total

Single by Total

from the album Total
- Released: April 15, 1996
- Genre: R&B
- Length: 4:42
- Label: Bad Boy; Arista
- Songwriters: Julian Jackson; Raphael Saadiq; Janice Johnson; Brian James
- Producer: Saadiq

Total singles chronology
"No One Else" (1995)	"Kissin' You" (1996)	"Loungin" (1996)

Music video
- "Kissin' You" on YouTube

"Kissin' You" is a song by American R&B girl group Total, released as the third single from their self-titled debut studio album (1996) on April 15, 1996. It is one of their most successful songs, peaking at number 12 on the Billboard Hot 100, and is an R&B track that incorporates acoustic elements. A remix of the song titled "Kissin' You / Oh Honey", featuring American rapper Puff Daddy, was also released.

== Charts ==
Chart (1996)	Peak position
New Zealand (Recorded Music NZ)	31
UK Singles (Official Charts)	29
US Billboard Hot 100	12
US Hot R&B/Hip-Hop Songs (Billboard)	6

== Certifications ==
Region	Certification	Certified units/sales
United States (RIAA)	Gold	500,000^{^}
^{^} Shipments figures based on certification alone.
