= 3 Strikes (soundtrack) =

3 Strikes (Original Motion Picture Soundtrack)

Soundtrack album by various artists
- Released: February 22, 2000
- Recorded: 1999–2000
- Studios: Mirror Image Studios (Dix Hills, New York); Digital Shack (Sherman Oaks, Los Angeles); Record Plant (Los Angeles, California); Poli's Crib; Daddy's House Recording Studio (Midtown Manhattan, New York)
- Genres: West Coast hip hop; R&B; gangsta rap
- Length: 47:58
- Label: Priority
- Producers: Andrew Shack (exec.); Marcus Morton (exec.); DJ Pooh (also exec.); Big Jaz; DJ Battlecat; Funk Daddy; J Dub; Kardinal Offishall; Ke'Noe; Poli Paul; Rico Lumpkins; Saint Denson; Dr. Nabu

Professional ratings
Review scores
Source	Rating
AllMusic	2/5 stars
RapReviews	6.5/10

3 Strikes (Original Motion Picture Soundtrack) is the soundtrack to DJ Pooh's 2000 comedy film 3 Strikes. It was released on February 22, 2000, via Priority Records and consists of hip hop music. Recording sessions took place at Mirror Image Studios and at Daddy's House Recording Studio in New York, at Digital Shack and at Record Plant in Los Angeles, and at Poli's Crib. Production was handled by DJ Battlecat, Funk Daddy, Jaz-O, J Dub, Kardinal Offishall, Ke'Noe, Poli Paul, Rico Lumpkins, Saint Denson, Dr. Nabu and DJ Pooh, who also served as executive producer with Andrew Shack and Marcus Morton. It features contributions from Blue, Choclair, C-Murder, Da Howg, E-40, Kam, Likwit Crew, Lil Zane, Nio Renee, Ras Kass, Sauce Money, Shawn Fonteno, Silkk the Shocker, Tha Eastsidaz and Total.

The soundtrack peaked at No. 190 on the Billboard 200 and No. 52 on the Top R&B/Hip-Hop Albums chart.

== Track listing ==
No.	Title	Writer(s)	Producer(s)	Length
1.	"G'd Up" (performed by Tha Eastsidaz)	C. Broadus; K. Spillman; K. Gilliam; T. Davis	DJ Battlecat	4:32
2.	"Worldwide Renegades" (performed by Da Howg and Lil' Zane)	R. Hankerson; W. Lamar Jr.; Z. Copeland	Saint Denson	4:44
3.	"Chart Climbin'" (performed by Sauce Money)	J. Burks	Big Jaz	4:24
4.	"Where I Come From" (performed by Solo and Kam)	C. Miller; S. Fonteno; M. Jordan	DJ Pooh	3:42
5.	"I'm Straight" (performed by E-40)	E. Stevens; G. Buren	Funk Daddy	4:09
6.	"Where Da Paper At" (performed by Likwit Crew)	A. Joiner; J. Robinson; R. Smith; R. McBride; M. Jordan	DJ Pooh	3:53
7.	"Where Dey At" (performed by Silkk the Shocker)	R. Lumpkins; V. Miller	Ricciano "Ricco" Lumpkins	3:57
8.	"Gotta Hold on Me" (performed by Nio Renee and Bleu Davinci)	N. Wilson; B. McKnight; M. Jordan	DJ Pooh	3:49
9.	"West Coast Mentality" (performed by Ras Kass)	J. Austin; P. Poli	Poli Paul; Dr. Nabu (co.)	3:59
10.	"Been a Long Time" (performed by C-Murder)	C. Miller; M. Jordan	Maurice "Kenoe" Jordan	3:11
11.	"Let's Ride" (performed by Choclair)	J. Harrow; K. Blake	Kardinal Offishall	3:45
12.	"Crave" (performed by Total)	J. Walker; K. Price	Jeffery "J-Dub" Walker	3:53
Total length:				47:50

== Charts ==
Chart (2000)	Peak position
US Billboard 200	190
US Top R&B/Hip-Hop Albums (Billboard)	52
