= What About Us (Total song) =

Single by Total

from the album Soul Food (soundtrack)
- Released: August 12, 1997
- Genre: R&B; hip-hop soul
- Length: 4:26
- Label: LaFace; Bad Boy
- Songwriters: Melissa Elliott; Timothy Mosley
- Producer: Timbaland

Total singles chronology
"When Boy Meets Girl" (1996)	"What About Us" (1997)	"What You Want" (1997)

Missy Elliott singles chronology
"Up Jumps da Boogie" (1997)	"What About Us" (1997)	"Sock It 2 Me" (1997)

Timbaland singles chronology
"What About Us" (1997)	"Hot Like Fire" (1997)

"What About Us" is a song by American R&B group Total, featuring Missy "Misdemeanor" Elliott and Timbaland. Issued on August 12, 1997, by LaFace and Bad Boy as the lead single from the soundtrack Soul Food: Music from the Soul Food Motion Picture. The single reached number 16 on the Billboard Hot 100 and number 4 on Hot R&B/Hip-Hop Songs in the United States, and finished at number 74 on the magazine’s 1997 year-end Hot 100 list. It was certified Gold by the RIAA.

== Music video ==
The official music video for the song was directed by Christopher Erskin.

== Background and release ==
"What About Us" was released as the lead single from Soul Food: Music from the Soul Food Motion Picture, a LaFace Records compilation issued on September 16, 1997. The single itself arrived earlier on August 12, 1997, backed by multiple mixes and instrumentals. Credits on commercial releases and databases attribute writing to Melissa Elliott and Timothy Mosley and production to Timbaland, with additional guitar credited to Darryl Pearson on the single release.

== Track listings and formats ==
European remix single

1. "What About Us" (Album Version with Rap) (featuring Missy "Misdemeanor" Elliott) — 4:46
2. "What About Us" (Album Version without Rap) — 4:23
3. "What About Us" (Lil Jon Remix) (featuring Sean Paul of YoungBloodZ) — 5:48
4. "What About Us" (Album Instrumental) — 4:18
5. "What About Us" (Lil Jon Remix Instrumental) — 5:48

US 12" vinyl

1. "What About Us" (Album Version w/ Rap) — 4:46
2. "What About Us" (Album Version without Rap) — 4:23
3. "What About Us" (Beat Box) — 4:29
4. "What About Us" (Acappella) — 4:22
5. "What About Us" (Instrumental) — 4:18

US CD single

1. "What About Us" — 4:06
2. "What About Us" (Instrumental) — 4:11

US remix single

1. "What About Us" (Lil Jon Remix Radio Edit) (featuring Missy "Misdemeanor" Elliott) — 4:06
2. "What About Us" (Lil Jon Remix without Rap) (featuring Missy "Misdemeanor" Elliott) — 4:11
3. "What About Us" (Lil Jon Remix Instrumental) — 5:47

== Charts ==
=== Weekly charts ===
Chart (1997)	Peak position
New Zealand (Recorded Music NZ)	48
US Billboard Hot 100	16
US Hot R&B/Hip-Hop Songs (Billboard)	4
US Rhythmic (Billboard)	16

=== Year-end charts ===
Chart (1997)	Position
UK Urban (Music Week)	14
US Billboard Hot 100	74
US Hot R&B/Hip-Hop Songs (Billboard)	27

== Certifications ==
Region	Certification	Certified units/sales
United States (RIAA)	Gold	700,000
