= Trippin' (Total song) =

Single by Total featuring Missy Elliott

from the album Kima, Keisha, and Pam
- Released: October 17, 1998
- Recorded: 1998
- Genre: Electro-R&B
- Length: 4:26
- Label: Bad Boy; Arista
- Songwriters: Keisha Spivey; Jakima Raynor; Melissa Elliott; Darryl Pearson; Timothy Mosley; Sean Combs; Mario Winans
- Producers: Missy "Misdemeanor" Elliott; Darryl Pearson; Timbaland; Puff Daddy; Mario Winans

Total singles chronology
"What You Want" (1997)	"Trippin'" (1998)	"Sitting Home" (1999)

Missy Elliott singles chronology
"I Want You Back" (1998)	"Trippin'" (1998)	"Here We Come" (1998)

Music video
- "Trippin'" on YouTube

"Trippin'" is a song by American R&B girl group Total, released as the first single from their second studio album Kima, Keisha, and Pam (1998). It was also their second release working with production and writing duo Missy "Misdemeanor" Elliott and Timbaland, after "What About Us?", although Timbaland this time provided only co-production and instrumentation, with the pair's longtime collaborator Darryl Pearson instead handling main production with Elliott. The track was by far the group's biggest hit, peaking at number seven on the U.S. Billboard Hot 100 and number three on the Hot R&B/Hip-Hop Songs chart.

The song was released with the "Puff Daddy, Harve Pierre & Mario Winans Remix" as the main version with regard to the single's cover and track listings. This remix featured a re-arranged version of the original lyrics, heavily sampled LL Cool J's "4, 3, 2, 1" and DMX (who also appeared on the sampled track) provided rap vocals. Both the original version (listed as "PD Mix") and another main remix (a similar, stripped-down version: the "Missy Mix") were also featured. Radio stations and the video, however, simply censored the album version and PD Mix and a video for the remix was not shot.

== Music video ==
The music video was directed by Joseph Kahn.

== Vocals ==
Lead Vocals: Pam (First verse, leads 1st singing of the chorus), Keisha (Second verse), Kima (Bridge)

Background Vocals: Pam, Keisha, Kima, Missy "Misdemeanor" Elliott

== Track listing ==
CD Single

1. Remix (Featuring DMX)
2. PD Mix
3. Missy Mix
4. Remix Instrumental

12" Vinyl Single
Side 1 Remix (Featuring DMX)

1. Club Mix
2. Radio Mix
3. Acappella

Side 2

1. PD Mix
2. Missy Mix
3. PD Mix: Acappella

== Charts ==
Chart (1998–1999)	Peak position
US Billboard Hot 100	7
US Hot R&B/Hip-Hop Songs (Billboard)	3
