= 6 Minutes of Pleasure =

Single by LL Cool J

from the album Mama Said Knock You Out
- B-side: "Eat 'Em Up L Chill"
- Released: May 30, 1991
- Recorded: 1990
- Genre: Hip hop
- Length: 4:40
- Label: Def Jam; Columbia
- Songwriter(s): James Todd Smith; Marlon Williams
- Producer(s): Marley Marl

LL Cool J singles chronology
| "Rampage" (1991) | "6 Minutes of Pleasure" (1991) | "Who's Afraid of the Big Bad Wolf?" (1991) |

"6 Minutes of Pleasure" is the fifth and final single from LL Cool J's fourth album, Mama Said Knock You Out. It was released in 1991 for Def Jam Recordings and featured production from Marley Marl. "6 Minutes of Pleasure" made it to 95 on the Billboard Hot 100 and 26 on the Hot R&B Singles chart. On the B-side was "Eat Em Up L Chill".

== Track listing ==
=== A-side ===
1. "6 Minutes of Pleasure" (Hey Girl Remix) – 4:35
2. "6 Minutes of Pleasure" (LP Version) – 4:30
3. "6 Minutes of Pleasure" (Remix Instrumental) – 4:50

=== B-side ===
1. "Eat 'Em Up L Chill" (Chill Remix) – 5:01
2. "Eat 'Em Up L Chill" (LP Version) – 4:43
3. "Eat 'Em Up L Chill" (Remix Instrumental) – 5:02

== Charts ==
Chart performance for "6 Minutes of Pleasure"
| Chart (1991) | Peak position |
|---|---|
| Australia (ARIA) | 93 |
| US Billboard Hot 100 | 95 |
| US Hot R&B/Hip-Hop Songs (Billboard) | 26 |
| US Hot Rap Songs (Billboard) | 7 |
