= Make Me Feel Better =

Make Me Feel Better may refer to:

- "Make Me Feel Better" (Alex Adair song), 2014
- "Make Me Feel Better", a 1977 song by Michael Henderson from Solid
- "Make Me Feel Better", a 2002 song by Natas from Godlike
