= Sitting Home =

1999 single by Total

Single by Total

from the album Kima, Keisha, and Pam
- Released: February 23, 1999
- Genre: R&B
- Length: 4:14
- Label: Bad Boy; Arista
- Songwriters: Deric "D-Dot" Angelettie; Errol Johnson; Garrett Blake; Jack Knight; Kenny Whitehead
- Producers: Angelettie; Blake

Total singles chronology
"Trippin'" (1998)	"Sitting Home" (1999)	"I Can't" (1999)

"Sitting Home" is a song by American R&B girl group Total, released as the second single from their second studio album Kima, Keisha, and Pam (1998) on February 23, 1999. It was written by Deric "D-Dot" Angelettie, Errol Johnson, Garrett Blake, Jack Knight and Kenny Whitehead, and produced by Angelettie and Blake. The song contains a sample of "Forget I Was a "G"" by Whitehead Bros. A remix of the song features Belizean rapper Shyne.

== Charts ==
Chart (1999)	Peak position
US Billboard Hot 100	42
US Hot R&B/Hip-Hop Songs (Billboard)	10
