= Do You Think About Us =

1996 single by Total

Single by Total

from the album Total
- Released: October 7, 1996
- Genre: R&B
- Length: 4:33
- Label: Bad Boy; Arista
- Songwriters: Raphael Saadiq; Janice Johnson
- Producer: Saadiq

Total singles chronology
"Loungin" (1996)	"Do You Think About Us" (1996)	"When Boy Meets Girl" (1996)

"Do You Think About Us" is a song by American R&B girl group Total, released as the fourth single from their self-titled debut studio album (1996) on October 7, 1996.

== Critical reception ==
Connie Johnson of Los Angeles Times considered "Do You Think About Us" one of the best songs from Total and described it as evoking the music of Faith Evans and T-Boz. Jacqueline Springer of Muzik commented that the song possesses a "cutesy vulnerability".

== Charts ==
Chart (1996)	Peak position
New Zealand (Recorded Music NZ)	40
UK Singles (OCC)	49
US Hot R&B/Hip-Hop Songs (Billboard)	20
