= Mama Said Knock You Out =

Studio album by LL Cool J
- Released: September 14, 1990
- Recorded: 1989–90
- Studios: Marley Marl's House of Hits in Chestnut Ridge and Chung King House of Metal in New York City
- Genres: Hip hop; East Coast hip-hop
- Length: 61:36
- Labels: Def Jam; Columbia
- Producer: Marley Marl

LL Cool J chronology
Walking with a Panther (1989)	Mama Said Knock You Out (1990)	14 Shots to the Dome (1993)

Singles from Mama Said Knock You Out
- 1. "To da Break of Dawn" Released: June 17, 1990; 2. "The Boomin' System" Released: August 2, 1990; 3. "Around the Way Girl" Released: November 20, 1990; 4. "Mama Said Knock You Out" Released: February 26, 1991; 5. "6 Minutes of Pleasure" Released: May 30, 1991

Mama Said Knock You Out is the fourth studio album by American rapper LL Cool J. It was produced mostly by Marley Marl and recorded at his "House of Hits" home studio in Chestnut Ridge and at Chung King House of Metal in New York City. After the disappointing reception of LL Cool's 1989 album Walking with a Panther, Mama Said Knock You Out was released by Def Jam Recordings on September 14, 1990, to commercial and critical success.

== Release and reception ==
Professional ratings
Review scores
Source	Rating
AllMusic	5/5 stars
Chicago Tribune	3.5/4 stars
Entertainment Weekly	B
NME	8/10
Rolling Stone	3.5/5 stars
The Rolling Stone Album Guide	4/5 stars
Select	4/5
The Source	4/5
Spin Alternative Record Guide	9/10
The Village Voice	A

Mama Said Knock You Out was released on September 14, 1990, by Def Jam Recordings. It was promoted with five singles, four of which became hits: "The Boomin' System", "Around the Way Girl", the title track, and "6 Minutes of Pleasure". The album was certified double platinum in the United States, having shipped two million copies. According to Yahoo! Music's Frank Meyer, Mama Said Knock You Out "seemed to set the world on fire in 1990", helped by its hit title track and LL Cool J's "sweaty performance" on MTV Unplugged. The title song reached number 17 on the Billboard Hot 100 and was certified gold by the RIAA. LL Cool J won Best Rap Solo Performance at the Grammy Awards of 1992.

In The New York Times, Jon Pareles wrote that Mama Said Knock You Out reestablished LL Cool J as "the most articulate of the homeboys", sounding "tougher and funnier" rapping about "crass materialism" and "simple pleasures". In Mark Cooper's review for Q, he wrote, "This 22-year-old veteran has lost neither his eye for everyday detail nor his sheer relish for words." Select magazine's Richard Cook said, "LL's stack of samples add the icing to a cake that is all dark, remorseless rhythm, a lo-fi drum beat shadowed by a crude bass rumble. It could be Jamaican dub they're making here, if it weren't for LL's slipper lip." Mama Said Knock You Out was voted the ninth best record of 1990 in the Pazz & Jop, an annual poll of American critics published by The Village Voice. Poll creator Robert Christgau later named it among his 10 favorite albums from the 1990s.

The album was included in Hip Hop Connection's "Phat Forty", a rundown of rap's greatest albums: "The LP's title track proved to be the single of the year and probably LL's best record since 'I'm Bad', while 'Eat 'Em Up L Chill' and 'To Da Break Of Dawn' was [sic] the sound of Cool J getting his own back – and in style." In 1998, it was listed in The Source's 100 Best Rap Albums. In 2005, comedian Chris Rock listed it as the sixth greatest hip-hop album ever in a guest article for Rolling Stone. In 2020, Rolling Stone ranked the album at No. 246 on their updated list of the 500 Greatest Albums of All Time. The hip hop duo Run the Jewels took their name from a lyric on the album's sixth track, "Cheesy Rat Blues".

== Track listing ==
All tracks written by James Todd Smith and Marlon Williams except otherwise noted.

No.	Title	Writer(s)	Producer(s)	Length
1.	"The Boomin' System"		Marley Marl; LL Cool J	3:41
2.	"Around the Way Girl"		Marl; LL Cool J	4:07
3.	"Eat 'Em Up, L Chill"		Marl; LL Cool J	4:37
4.	"Mr. Good Bar"		Marl; LL Cool J	3:42
5.	"Murdergram (Live at Rapmania)"		Marl; LL Cool J	3:53
6.	"Cheesy Rat Blues"		Marl; LL Cool J	5:06
7.	"Farmers Blvd. (Our Anthem)" (featuring Big Money Grip, Bomb, HIC)		Marl; LL Cool J	4:26
8.	"Mama Said Knock You Out"		Marl; Bobby "Bobcat" Erving	4:50
9.	"Milky Cereal"		Marl; LL Cool J	3:54
10.	"Jingling Baby (Remixed but Still Jingling)"	Brian Latture; Dwayne Simon; LL Cool J	Marl; LL Cool J	4:57
11.	"To da Break of Dawn"		Marl; LL Cool J	4:32
12.	"6 Minutes of Pleasure"		Marl; LL Cool J	4:34
13.	"Illegal Search"		Marl; LL Cool J	4:31
14.	"The Power of God"		Marl; LL Cool J	4:21

Japan 2000 CD bonus track
No.	Title	Producer(s)	Length
15.	"Mama Said Knock You Out" (Steering Mix)	Marl	4:49

Notes: The single version of the track "Jingling Baby (Remixed but Still Jingling)" was remixed by Marley Marl. "The Boomin' System" is censored on all editions of the album. The 12" single has the uncensored version.

2014 expanded edition – disc two
No.	Title	Length
1.	"Mama Said Knock You Out" (12" Remix)
2.	"Mama Said Knock You Out" (Hot Mix; Long)
3.	"Mama Said Knock You Out" (7 A.M. Mix)
4.	"Mama Said Knock You Out" (For Steering Pleasure)
5.	"Around the Way Girl" (Untouchables Remix)
6.	"Around the Way Girl" (Crypt 12" Mix)
7.	"Around the Way Girl" (Jerv's 12" Rub Mix)
8.	"Around the Way Girl" (Marley Rub)
9.	"To Da Break of Dawn" (Remix Version)
10.	"To Da Break of Dawn" (Bug Out Mix)
11.	"6 Minutes of Pleasure" (Hey Girl Remix)
12.	"The Boomin' System" (The Underground Mix)
13.	"Eat Em Up L Chill" (Chill Remix)
14.	"Strictly Business"

== Personnel ==
Credits are adapted from AllMusic.

- James Baynard – trumpet
- Flex – background vocals
- David Kennedy – engineer
- Darren Lighty – background vocals, keyboards, programming
- LL Cool J – producer, vocals
- Marley Marl – engineer, producer
- Eric Williams – background vocals

== Charts ==
=== Weekly charts ===
Chart (1990–1991)	Peak position
Australian Albums (ARIA)	67
UK Albums (Official Charts)	49
US Billboard 200	16
US Top R&B/Hip-Hop Albums (Billboard)	2

=== Year-end charts ===
Chart (1990)	Position
US Top R&B/Hip-Hop Albums (Billboard)	91
Chart (1991)	Position
US Billboard 200	13
US Top R&B/Hip-Hop Albums (Billboard)	5

== Certifications ==
Region	Certification	Certified units/sales
Canada (Music Canada)	Gold	50,000^{^}
United States (RIAA)	2× Platinum	2,000,000^{^}
^{^} Shipments figures based on certification alone.
