= Makes Me Feel =

Single by Devotion
- B-side: "Remix"
- Released: 7 June 1994
- Genre: Eurodance
- Length: 3:56
- Label: Dance Pool
- Songwriters: Cecilie Hafstad; "Jimmy James" Ekgren; Hans Olav Grøttheim
- Producer: Hans Olav Grøttheim

Devotion singles chronology
"Makes Me Feel" (1994)	"Move Me" (1995)

Music video
- "Makes Me Feel" on YouTube

"Makes Me Feel" is a song by Norwegian Eurodance group Devotion, consisting of singer Silya (Cecilie Hafstad) and rapper Jimmy James (James Ekgren). It was written by the group with producer Hans Olav Grøttheim and released as a single in June 1994 by label Dance Pool. The song became a commercial success on the Norwegian singles chart, peaking at number three. It spent a total of ten weeks on the chart and received heavy national rotation on radio. Additionally, it reached number 17 in Finland and number 91 on the Eurochart Hot 100. Product manager Thomas Sem described the song as a cross between Culture Beat and Cappella.

Devotion released a total of three singles during 1994-95 through the label Dance Pool: "Makes Me Feel", "Higher" and "Move Me". After the latter flopped, Silya left the group, and the project was discontinued. "Makes Me Feel" was also the first Scandinavian release which was released by Dance Pool. An album was originally planned for release in September/October 1994, followed by a tour.

== Critical reception ==
Asbjørn Bakke from Arbeiderbladet gave the song a score of four out of six and named it a "contemporary dance pop song". He wrote, "What it lacks in originality it makes up for by having everything it needs to be a hit nonetheless. Jimmy James' rolling rapping fuels a furious rhythm."

== Music video ==
The accompanying music video, directed by Björn Lindgren, was shot on a beach in Mälarhusen, outside Malmö in Sweden, and also features Anneli Drecker from Bel Canto and Silvany Bricen from Trancylvania as dancers. It was produced by Appolon Lyd & Film which had produced videos for acts like Culture Beat, Ace of Base and Dr. Alban.

== Track listing ==
- CD maxi (1994)
1. "Makes Me Feel" (Radio Mix) — 3:56
2. "Makes Me Feel" (Makes Me Groove) — 4:29
3. "Makes Me Feel" (A Capella De Luxe) — 3:57
4. "Makes Me Feel" (Beats & Vocals Mix) — 3:41
5. "Makes Me Feel" (Like King Karaoke Mix) — 3:55
- CD maxi (remix) (1994)
1. "Makes Me Feel" (Club Mix) — 6:32
2. "Makes Me Feel" (Euro Mix) — 5:04
3. "Makes Me Feel" (Garage Mix) — 6:20
4. "Makes Me Feel" (Club Instrumental) — 6:31

== Charts ==
Chart (1994)	Peak position
Europe (Eurochart Hot 100)	91
Finland (IFPI)	17
Norway (Ti i skuddet)	7
Norway (VG-lista)	3
