= When Boy Meets Girl (Total song) =

1996 single by Total

Single by Total

from the album Total
- Released: 1996
- Genre: R&B; retro-soul
- Length: 4:18
- Label: Bad Boy; Arista
- Songwriters: Tammy Lucas; Pharrell Williams; Chad Hugo; Quinnes Parker; Marvin Scandrick; Keisha Spivey; Pamela Long; Barry Gibb; Robin Gibb
- Producers: The Neptunes; Sean Combs

Total singles chronology
"Do You Think About Us" (1996)	"When Boy Meets Girl" (1996)	"What About Us" (1997)

"When Boy Meets Girl" is a song by American R&B girl group Total and the fifth single from their self-titled debut studio album (1996). Produced by the Neptunes and Sean "Puffy" Combs, it contains a sample of "Love You Inside Out" by the Bee Gees. The song has been described as a "delicious retro-soul".

== Charts ==
Chart (1996)	Peak position
US Billboard Hot 100	50
US Hot R&B/Hip-Hop Songs (Billboard)	20
