= Doin' It (LL Cool J song) =

1996 single by LL Cool J

"Doin It"

Single by LL Cool J

from the album Mr. Smith
- B-side: "Hey Lover"
- Released: February 20, 1996
- Length: 4:54
- Label: Def Jam
- Songwriters: James Smith; Rashad Smith; Grace Jones
- Producer: Rashad Smith

LL Cool J singles chronology
"Hey Lover" (1995)	"Doin It" (1996)	"Loungin" (1996)

"Doin It" is a song by American rapper LL Cool J, released by Def Jam Recordings on February 20, 1996, as the second single from his sixth album, Mr. Smith (1995). Based on a sample of Grace Jones' "My Jamaican Guy", it contains a guest appearance from LeShaun (who previously released a song with the same sample and theme in 1988 titled "Wild Thang"), while production was handled by Rashad Smith. Its B-side is the album's previous single, "Hey Lover".

"Doin It" peaked at numbers five and nine on the US Cash Box Top 100 and Billboard Hot 100 charts, and number seven on the Billboard Hot R&B Singles chart. In several interviews, both LL Cool J and Smith have stated that the instrumental was originally meant for the Notorious B.I.G. on his Life After Death album. The crowd noise heard throughout the song, shouting "Go Brooklyn!", is sampled from "Go Stetsa" by Stetsasonic. Furthermore, the hook of "Doin It" interpolates "Wild Thang" by 2 Much, a group LeShaun was part of.

== Background ==
"Doin It" was written by LL Cool J and Rashad Smith for the former's sixth album, Mr. Smith (1995), with Smith overseeing production on the track. The song contains a sample from Jamaican entertainer Grace Jones' 1983 song "My Jamaican Guy." Originally intended for The Notorious B.I.G.'s second studio album, Life After Death (1997), it was Biggie's idea for Smith to sample Jones' song. Although B.I.G. liked the track Smith created using "My Jamaican Guy," the album's budget had not yet been approved, and, due to Smith's financial struggles, he took the song to Def Jam executive Chris Lighty, who offered him twice the original price for the beats he had produced in exchange for using them on LL Cool J's album. This decision ultimately led to a falling out between B.I.G. and Smith.

Lyrically, "Doin It" finds its performers discussing their sexual desire for each other. In an 2012 interview with Entertainment Weekly, LL Cool J commented on the song: "That's one of my favorites, because what's better than doin' it? And the track pounds just like you're doing it. It just made me feel good, you know? "I represent Queens/She was raised out of Brooklyn" has definitely become part of the vernacular, I guess you would call it."

== Music video ==
The accompanying music video, directed by American director Hype Williams, was shot in January 1996. LeShaun did not appear in the video, as she was pregnant at the time, although several models took her place and lip synced her parts.

== Remix ==
The remix appears on the soundtrack to The Nutty Professor samples the Art of Noise's song "Moments in Love."

== Legacy ==
American singer Keri Hilson sampled this song in her song "Do It" (featuring Tank), from her debut album In a Perfect World... (2009). Fabolous, LL Cool J's fellow New York native, sampled the song for his song "Doin it Well" (featuring Nicki Minaj and Trey Songz), from his mixtape Summertime Shootout (2015).

== Track listing ==
A1. "Doin It" (LP version) – 4:40
A2. "Doin It" (Unarmed version) – 4:05
B1. "Hey Lover" (Street version) – 4:04
B1. "Hey Lover" (Street instrumental) – 4:04

== Charts ==
=== Weekly charts ===
Weekly chart performance for "Doin It"
Chart (1996)	Peak position
Australia (ARIA)	65
Europe (Eurochart Hot 100)	65
Europe (European Dance Radio)	20
Germany (GfK)	36
Netherlands (Dutch Top 40)	9
Netherlands (Single Top 100)	10
New Zealand (Recorded Music NZ)	16
Scottish Singles Sales (Official Charts)	57
Sweden (Sverigetopplistan)	14
Switzerland (Schweizer Hitparade)	47
UK Singles (Official Charts)	15
UK Dance (Official Charts)	4
UK Hip Hop/R&B (Official Charts)	4
US Billboard Hot 100	9
US Dance Singles Sales (Billboard) with "I Shot Ya"	3
US Hot R&B/Hip-Hop Songs (Billboard)	7
US Hot Rap Songs (Billboard)	2
US Rhythmic Airplay (Billboard)	17
US Cash Box Top 100	5

=== Year-end charts ===
Year-end chart performance for "Doin It"
Chart (1996)	Position
Netherlands (Dutch Top 40)	77
Netherlands (Single Top 100)	91
US Billboard Hot 100	61
US Hot R&B Singles (Billboard)	48
US Hot Rap Singles (Billboard)	14
US Maxi-Singles Sales (Billboard)	31
US Top 40/Rhythm-Crossover (Billboard)	44

== Certifications and sales ==
Certificationa for "Doin It"
Region	Certification	Certified units/sales
United States (RIAA)	Platinum	1,000,000
