= Systa =

Studio album by Terri & Monica
- Released: September 21, 1993
- Recorded: 1992–1993
- Studio: Soundtrack Studios; Chung King Studios; Unique Recording Studios (New York City, New York)
- Genre: Hip hop, R&B
- Length: 44:03
- Label: Epic
- Producer: Horace Brown, Bryce Wilson, Grand Puba, Kev "Boogie" Smith, Kevin Deane, Gordon Chambers & James "Funk" Alexander, Dennis "D-Moe" Moorehead & Steve "Superman" White

Terri & Monica chronology
Love Me or Leave Me (1988)	Systa (1993)	Suga (1996)

Singles from Systa
- 1. "Uh Huh" Released: August 23, 1993; 2. "Intentions" Released: November 1, 1993; 3. "I've Been Waiting" Released: February 15, 1994

Systa is the debut album by female hip-hop duo, Terri & Monica. It is their second album overall as they released Love Me or Leave Me as members of The Gyrlz. It was released on September 21, 1993, for Epic Records and featured production from Horace Brown, Bryce Wilson and Grand Puba. The two singles that were released were "Intentions" and "Uh Huh". "I've Been Waiting" was featured on the soundtrack to Poetic Justice, a motion picture starring Janet Jackson and Tupac Shakur.

== Track listing ==
Credits adapted from liner notes.

1. "Uh-Huh" (Terri Robinson, Monica Payne, Tara Geter, Kevin Smith) - 3:35
2. "Over It" (Robinson, Payne, Geter, Maxwell Dixon) - 3:46
3. "Intentions" (Robinson, Payne, Geter, Kevin Smith) - 3:27
4. "Next Time" (Robinson, Payne, Bryce Wilson) - 3:58
5. "I've Been Waiting" (Robinson, Geter, Kevin Deane) - 4:20
6. "I Need Your Love" (Robinson, Gordon Chambers, James Alexander) - 4:58
7. "The Way You Make Me Feel" (Robinson, Payne, Geter, Horace Brown) - 5:07
8. "Temptation" (Robinson, Payne, Brown) - 4:53
9. "Where Are You Now" (Robinson, Payne, Geter, Brown) - 5:10
10. "When the Tables Turn" (Payne, Geter, Dennis Moorehead, Steven White) - 5:05

== Samples ==
- "Uh-Huh" contains a sample of "Lisa Listen to Me", as performed by Blood, Sweat & Tears
- "Intentions" contains a sample of "Supernatural Thing", as performed by Ben E. King

== Personnel ==
Credits adapted from liner notes and Allmusic.

- Terri Robinson - lead and background vocals
- Monica Payne - lead and background vocals
- Tara Geter - background vocals, co-executive producer
- Horace Brown - background vocals
- Bernard Grobman - guitar
- Clyde Jones - guitar
- Jeff Andrews - bass
- Herman Crump - keyboards
- Gordon Chambers - keyboards, trumpet solo
- Oscar Cartaya - bass
- T-Marlow - recording engineer
- Eric "Ibo" Butler - recording engineer
- Charles Alexander - recording engineer, mixing
- Dave Kennedy - mixing
- Warren Woods - mixing
- Angela Piva - mixing
- Paris Davis - executive producer
- Nick Vacarro - photography
- Jennifer Roddle - design
