= Terri & Monica =

American contemporary R&B duo

- Also known as: The Gyrlz
- Origin: Harlem, New York (Terri Robinson); South Carolina (Monica Payne, Tara Geter)
- Genres: R&B, new jack swing
- Instrument: vocals
- Years active: 1988–1990 (The Gyrlz); 1993–1997 (Terri & Monica)
- Labels: Uptown, Capitol, Epic
- Past members: Terri Robinson; Monica Payne; Tara Geter

Terri & Monica was an R&B duo from the early 1990s that featured Terri Robinson (born August 12, 1970) and Monica Payne (born February 22, 1969), who were members of the short-lived late 1980s New Jack Swing R&B group The Gyrlz along with third member Tara Geter.

As members of The Gyrlz, they released one album for Uptown Records under distribution from Capitol Records- 1988's Love Me or Leave Me.

After Geter left the group, Robinson and Payne continued on as a duo, releasing their debut album Systa in 1993, in which Geter still contributed writing to. Their sophomore album Suga was released exclusively in Europe in 1996 as a limited CD release. The album spawned a single, "Sexuality (If You Take Your Love)", released in July 1996.

Sometime in early 2022, Terri & Monica's second album Suga was also officially released by Epic Records on digital and streaming platforms. March 2022 also saw the digital and streaming release of The Gyrlz' long out of print debut album Love Me or Leave Me by Universal Music Group.

== Discography ==
As The Gyrlz

- 1988: Love Me or Leave Me

As Terri & Monica

- 1993: Systa
- 1996: Suga

== Contributions, compilations, and collaborations ==
- "I've Been Waiting" a track from their 1993 debut was featured on the soundtrack to Poetic Justice, a motion picture starring Janet Jackson and Tupac Shakur. Another hit single, "Uh-Huh", was featured on Hey Mr. DJ: The 4th Compilation as a remix from Mood II Swing.
- In 1993, Terri and Monica sang the hook on Heavy D's "Truthful".
- They performed alongside Shabba Ranks and Patra on "Family Affair". The song, a revision of the 1971 hit single from Sly & the Family Stone, was featured on the Addams Family Values motion picture soundtrack.
- In the 1990s, Terri Robinson contributed background vocals to both theme songs on the television series In Living Color.
- In 1995, the duo performed with LL Cool J on the tracks "Hip-Hop" and "Loungin"' from LL Cool J's 1995 album Mr. Smith. They also made a contribution to the Money Train motion picture soundtrack.
- Terri Robinson worked behind the scenes as a background vocalist and songwriter on albums by Total, Soul for Real, Monifah, Al B. Sure! and Mary J. Blige among others. Robinson also contributed background vocals on the Pete Rock & CL Smooth single "Lots of Lovin'" from their debut album Mecca and the Soul Brother.
- Monica Payne's last studio appearance was on the soundtrack to the Will Smith film Wild Wild West, singing the hook to the Tim & Bob produced MC Lyte song "Keep It Movin'". Payne is currently the manager of V. Bozeman, a singer signed to Timbaland's record label Mosley Music Group.
- As of 2021, Monica Payne is a label executive for Max Gousse's Warner Records distributed label, Artistry Worldwide - home to American rapper Saweetie.
