= Loungin =

1996 single by LL Cool J

Single by LL Cool J featuring Total

from the album Mr. Smith
- B-side: "Summer Luv"
- Released: June 25, 1996
- Length: 4:10
- Label: Def Jam Music Group
- Songwriters: LL Cool J; Burton Rashad Smith; Albert Joseph Brown III (album version); Kyle West (album version); Bernard Wright (remix); Leonard White (remix)
- Producers: Rashad Smith (album version); Tone (remix)

LL Cool J singles chronology
"Doin' It" (1996)	"Loungin" (1996)	"This Is for the Lover in You" (1996)

Total singles chronology
"Kissin' You" (1996)	"Loungin" (1996)	"Do You Think About Us" (1996)

Audio sample
- 22 second sample: file; help

Music video
- "Loungin (Who Do Ya Luv)" on YouTube

"Loungin" is a song by American rapper LL Cool J, released on June 25, 1996, as the third and final single from his sixth studio album, Mr. Smith (1995). Issued by Def Jam Music Group, the LP version was produced by Rashad Smith and features backing vocals by R&B duo Terri & Monica. The radio edit was remixed by Trackmasters (under the name Tone) and features backing vocals from R&B group Total. "Loungin (Who Do Ya Luv)" was later included on LL Cool J's compilation album All World: Greatest Hits and also appeared in an episode of his sitcom, In the House. In June 2026, CBS News included the song on its list of the "250 Essential American Songs of the Past 250 Years".

== Composition ==
This original LP version of "Loungin" features a sample of "Nite and Day" by Al B. Sure!, while "Loungin (Who Do Ya Luv)" samples "Who Do You Love" by Bernard Wright.

== Commercial performance ==
The single was a commercial success, peaking at number three on both the US Billboard Hot 100 and Cash Box Top 100 charts, number one on the Billboard Hot Rap Singles chart, and number four on the Billboard Hot R&B Singles chart. It sold 1.3 million copies, earning a platinum certification from the Recording Industry Association of America (RIAA).

== Music video ==
The music video for "Loungin (Who Do Ya Luv)" was directed by American director Hype Williams. It includes a cameo from Funkmaster Flex as well as performance shots from Total. The video depicts LL Cool J having an affair with a woman who is unhappy in her relationship.

== Track listing ==
A1. "Loungin" (radio remix edit) – 3:45
A2. "Loungin" (LP radio edit) – 3:59
B1. "Loungin" (LP version) – 4:10
B2. "Summer Luv" – 4:38

== Charts ==
=== Weekly charts ===
Chart (1996)	Peak position
Australia (ARIA)	56
Canada (Nielsen SoundScan)	3
Europe (Eurochart Hot 100)	23
Europe (European Dance Radio)	9
France (SNEP)	46
Germany (GfK)	32
Ireland (IRMA)	19
Netherlands (Dutch Top 40)	10
Netherlands (Single Top 100)	11
New Zealand (Recorded Music NZ)	11
Scottish Singles Sales (Official Charts)	32
Sweden (Sverigetopplistan)	12
UK Singles (Official Charts)	7
UK Dance (Official Charts)	3
UK Hip Hop/R&B (Official Charts)	2
US Billboard Hot 100	3
US Hot R&B/Hip-Hop Songs (Billboard)	4
US Hot Rap Songs (Billboard)	1
US Rhythmic Airplay (Billboard)	4
US Cash Box Top 100	3

=== Year-end charts ===
Chart (1996)	Position
New Zealand (RIANZ)	43
Sweden (Topplistan)	89
UK Singles (OCC)	95
US Billboard Hot 100	21
US Hot R&B Singles (Billboard)	20
US Hot Rap Singles (Billboard)	3
US Maxi-Singles Sales (Billboard)	30
US Top 40/Rhythm-Crossover (Billboard)	20

== Certifications ==
Region	Certification	Certified units/sales
United States (RIAA)	Platinum	1,300,000

== Release history ==
Region	Date	Format(s)	Label(s)	Ref.
United States	June 25, 1996	—N/a	Def Jam Music Group	
United States	August 13, 1996	Contemporary hit radio	Def Jam Music Group	
United Kingdom	September 23, 1996	12-inch vinyl; CD; cassette	Def Jam Music Group	
Japan	October 25, 1996	CD	Def Jam Music Group	
