= Mr. Smith (album) =

Studio album by LL Cool J
- Released: November 21, 1995
- Recorded: 1994–1995
- Genres: East Coast hip-hop; hardcore hip-hop
- Length: 58:25
- Labels: Def Jam; PolyGram
- Producers: Rashad Smith; Chyskillz; Chad Elliott; Trackmasters; Easy Mo Bee

LL Cool J chronology
14 Shots to the Dome (1993)	Mr. Smith (1995)	All World: Greatest Hits (1996)

Singles from Mr. Smith
- 1. "Hey Lover" Released: October 31, 1995; 2. "Doin' It" Released: February 20, 1996; 3. "Loungin" Released: June 25, 1996

Mr. Smith is the sixth studio album by American hip hop recording artist LL Cool J, released on November 21, 1995, by Def Jam. The album has been certified Double Platinum in the US by the RIAA.

== Overview ==
Mr. Smith was produced by Rashad Smith, Chyskillz, Chad Elliott, Trackmasters, and Easy Mo Bee. Artists such as the Emotions, Terri & Monica, Boyz II Men, Fat Joe, Keith Murray, Prodigy, and Foxy Brown made guest appearances on the album.

== Critical reception ==
Professional ratings
Review scores
Source	Rating
AllMusic	3/5 stars
Robert Christgau	(choice cut)
Entertainment Weekly	B
Q	3/5 stars
Rolling Stone	3/5 stars
Smash Hits	4/5
The Source	4/5 stars

Mr. Smith garnered positive reviews from music critics who found it a return to form after the West Coast-influenced 14 Shots to the Dome flopped. AllMusic's Stephen Thomas Erlewine praised the album for working more towards LL's romantic side that while toned down remains sexually invigorating, concluding that "Mr. Smith isn't a perfect record – there are too many slack moments for it to qualify as one of his best – but it proves that LL Cool J remained vital a decade after his debut." Robert Christgau cited "Doin' It" as a "choice cut", indicating a good song on "an album that isn't worth your time or money." Mike Flaherty of Entertainment Weekly praised the album for balancing the various personas LL adopts throughout the tracks, concluding that "while his cutting-edge days are well behind him, this is far from the self-parodying effort we had every reason to expect." Cheo H. Coker of Rolling Stone also praised the album for delivering both hardcore rap songs and love ballads that contain great production and lyrical dexterity. But Coker noted that tracks like "No Airplay" and "Get da Drop on 'Em" showcase LL better as a tough lyric spitter, concluding with, "Maybe one day LL will realize that it's his electrifying flow, not his Casanova aspirations, that have made him a rap superstar for 10 years running."

== Track listing ==
Mr. Smith track listing
No.	Title	Writer(s)	Producer(s)	Length
1.	"The Intro (skit)"	James Todd Smith; Jean-Claude Olivier	Trackmasters	1:33
2.	"Make It Hot"	J.T. Smith; Olivier; El DeBarge; Randy DeBarge; Bunny DeBarge	Trackmasters	4:31
3.	"Hip Hop"	J.T. Smith; Samuel Barnes; James Harris; Terry Lewis	Trackmasters	5:00
4.	"Hey Lover" (featuring Boyz II Men)	Rod Temperton; J.T. Smith	Trackmasters	4:44
5.	"Doin It" (featuring LeShaun)	J.T. Smith; Burton Rashad Smith; Grace Jones	Rashad Smith	4:53
6.	"Life As..." (previously featured on the Street Fighter soundtrack)	J.T. Smith; Osten S. Harvey Jr.	Easy Mo Bee	2:44
7.	"I Shot Ya" (featuring Keith Murray)	J.T. Smith; Olivier; James Brown; Lyn Collins	Trackmasters	3:51
8.	"Mr. Smith"	J.T. Smith; Chylow Parker; Hubert Laws	Chyskillz; Trackmasters (add.)	3:59
9.	"No Airplay"	J.T. Smith; Chad Elliott; Maurice White; Jerry Peters	Chad "Dr. Seuss" Elliott	5:43
10.	"Loungin" (featuring Terri & Monica)	J.T. Smith; B.R. Smith; Albert Joseph Brown III; Kyle West	Rashad Smith	4:12
11.	"Hollis to Hollywood"	J.T. Smith; Barnes; Burt Bacharach; Hal David	Trackmasters	3:58
12.	"God Bless"	J.T. Smith; B.R. Smith; J. Brown	Rashad Smith	3:47
13.	"Get da Drop on 'Em"	J.T. Smith; Olivier	Trackmasters	3:57
14.	"Prelude (skit)"	Olivier	Trackmasters	0:30
15.	"I Shot Ya (Remix)" (featuring Keith Murray, Prodigy, Fat Joe and Foxy Brown)	J.T. Smith; Olivier; J. Brown; Collins	Trackmasters	5:03

Bonus track
No.	Title	Length
16.	"Papa Luv It" (previously featured on The Show soundtrack)	4:57

Notes

- "No Airplay" was edited on both the edited and explicit versions of the album. The explicit version only backmasks on the song, while the edited version even edits the intro.
- "Hollis to Hollywood" is sampled from his verse of Craig Mack's "Flava in Ya Ear (Remix)" on the chorus.

Sample Credits

- "Make It Hot" contains a sample from "I Like It", written by El DeBarge/Randy DeBarge/Bunny DeBarge and performed by DeBarge.
- "Hip Hop" contains a sample of "Tell Me If You Still Care", written by James Harris/Terry Lewis and performed by the S.O.S. Band.
- "Hey Lover" contains a sample of "The Lady in My Life", written by Rod Temperton and performed by Michael Jackson.
- "Doin' It" contains a sample of "My Jamaican Guy", written and performed by Grace Jones.
- "I Shot Ya" contains a sample of "Put It on the Line", written by James Brown/Lyn Collins and performed by Lyn Collins.
- "Mr. Smith" contains a sample of "What a Night", written and performed by Hubert Laws.
- "No Airplay" contains a sample of "Blessed", written by Maurice White/Jerry Peters and performed by the Emotions.
- "Loungin" contains an interpolation of "Nite and Day", written by Albert Joseph Brown III/Kyle West.
- "Hollis to Hollywood" contains a sample of "The Look of Love", written by Burt Bacharach/Hal David and performed by Isaac Hayes.
- "God Bless" contains a sample of "Message from the Soul Sisters", written by James Brown and performed by Myra Barnes.

== Charts ==
=== Weekly charts ===
Weekly chart performance for Mr. Smith
Chart (1995–1996)	Peak position
Australian Albums (ARIA)	97
Dutch Albums (Album Top 100)	33
German Albums (Offizielle Top 100)	75
Swedish Albums (Sverigetopplistan)	60
UK Albums (Official Charts)	90
UK R&B Albums (Official Charts)	9
US Billboard 200	20
US Top R&B/Hip-Hop Albums (Billboard)	4

=== Year-end charts ===
Year-end chart performance for Mr. Smith
Chart (1996)	Position
US Billboard 200	28
US Top R&B/Hip-Hop Albums (Billboard)	11

== Certifications ==
Certifications for Mr. Smith
Region	Certification	Certified units/sales
Canada (Music Canada)	Gold	50,000^{^}
United Kingdom (BPI)	Silver	60,000^{*}
United States (RIAA)	2× Platinum	2,000,000^{^}
^{*} Sales figures based on certification alone.^{^} Shipments figures based on certification alone.
