= Total (group) =

American R&B girl group

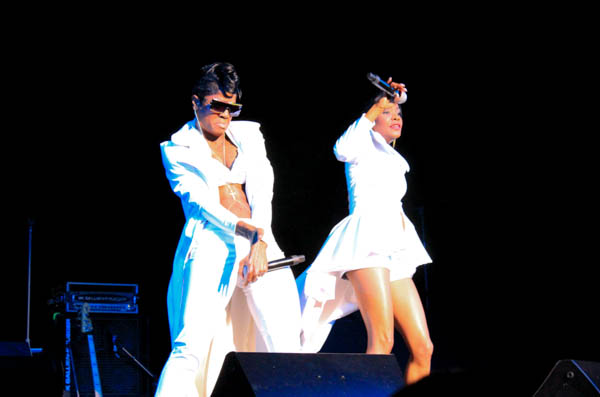
- L-R: Pamela Long and Kima Raynor Dyson perform at the Legends of Bad Boy concert in Beverly Hills, California in 2014. Not pictured: Keisha Spivey Epps.

Background information
- Origin: New Jersey, U.S.
- Genres: R&B; hip-hop soul
- Years active: 1994–2001; 2014–2016; 2024–present
- Label: Bad Boy (1994–1998)
- Members: Kima Raynor; Keisha Spivey
- Past members: Pamela Long

Total is an American R&B girl group and one of the signature acts of the Bad Boy Records imprint during the mid-1990s. The group consists of founding members Kima Raynor, Keisha Spivey, and Pamela Long. Total is best known for their feature on Mase's "What You Want", as well as their hits "Kissin' You", "Can't You See" (featuring The Notorious B.I.G.), and "What About Us?" and "Trippin'", both featuring Missy Elliott. Long also sang the chorus of The Notorious B.I.G.'s hit song "Hypnotize", although she was not officially credited. Total made their first appearance singing the hook on The Notorious B.I.G.'s debut single for Bad Boy Records, "Juicy", widely considered one of the greatest hip-hop songs of all time.

In 2019, Pamela Long announced that she is working on her debut solo album. She released a video for her single "Why".

== Career ==
The trio made their first appearance singing the hook on The Notorious B.I.G.'s debut single, "Juicy". Garnering attention for the new group, they were also featured on the original version and "Hip Hop Remix" of his next single "One More Chance". They then immediately hit the studio with Bad Boy Records CEO Sean Combs and began work on their debut album. The first single "Can't You See?" first appeared on the soundtrack to 1995 motion picture, New Jersey Drive. The song featured The Notorious B.I.G. and peaked at number 13 on the Billboard Hot 100 as well as number 2 on the R&B Chart. Their self-titled debut album was released nearly a year after the single. Total produced two more R&B top ten singles including: "No One Else" (and its remix featuring Lil' Kim, Foxy Brown, and Da Brat) and '"Kissin' You" (and its remix featuring Sean Combs). The album was certified platinum by the RIAA.

While recording their second album, they appeared on numerous top ten singles, including LL Cool J's "Loungin (Who Do Ya Luv)", Foxy Brown's "I Can't", and Mase's "What You Want" featuring Keisha Epps, and Pamela Long sung the chorus on the hit "Hypnotize" by The Notorious B.I.G. The group also released another single, the Missy Elliott and Timbaland track "What About Us?" from the Soul Food soundtrack.

Their follow-up album, Kima, Keisha, and Pam, debuted to strong reviews, sales, and was certified gold by the RIAA. The first single, another Missy Elliott collaboration, "Trippin'", reached the top ten of the US Billboard Hot 100 chart. Their next release, "Sitting Home", which made Top 10 of the Billboard R&B Singles did not garner the same attention. While in heavy rotation on video networks like BET, radio chose not to play the song. A remix of the track featured rap artist Shyne.

After the release of Kima, Keisha, and Pam, the girls sang the chorus to rap duo Gang Starr's 1999 single "Discipline" and, in 2000, they were featured on the Tony Touch single "(I Wonder Why) He's the Greatest DJ". They also contributed to the songs "Crave" to 3 Strikes and the songs "Quick Rush" to Bait movie soundtrack.

In their last official appearance together, they were thanked in the credits for their collaboration with Da Beatminerz and Talib Kweli - Anti-Love Movement in 2001 from their album Brace 4 Impak.

=== Comeback ===
In 2014, Long and Dyson reunited and began performing as a duo under the "Total" name. On November 30, 2014, Total joined Lil' Kim, Da Brat, Missy Elliott, and Left Eye (posthumously via video) to sing "Not Tonight (Ladies Night)" at the 2014 Soul Train Music Awards. Angie Martinez was the only living original performer who did not perform at the event.

In May 2015, Total toured with R. Kelly, on the Funk Fest tour. In 2016, Spivey Epps rejoined the group for the nationwide Bad Boy Family Reunion Tour.

=== Currently ===
Keisha Spivey married actor Omar Epps in 2006 and is living in California. They have daughter and son together; as well as Omar's daughter with ex wife Yusra Salama.

Pamela Long still lives in New Jersey. She is a member at Agape Family Worship Center located in Rahway. In 2021, she made an appearance on BET Presents: The Encore, with Kima making a guest appearance.

A track by Kima featuring her sister, rapper Vita, called "What U Want", also leaked online.

In 2024, Epps and Dyson came back together without Long and joined the Queens of R&B Tour, along with Xscape, SWV, 702 and Mýa.

In November 2025, Total joined Case and 112 (Slim & Mike) on Room 112 Tour, celebrating their 30th Anniversary, which ended in February 2026.

== Discography ==
Studio albums

- Total (1996)
- Kima, Keisha, and Pam (1998)

== Videography ==
- From Total (1996)
  - "No One Else"
  - "No One Else" (Puff Daddy Remix)
  - "Kissin' You"
  - "Kissin' You" / "Oh Honey"
  - "Can't You See"
  - "Can't You See" (Bad Boy Remix)
  - "Do You Think About Us"
- From Kima, Keisha, and Pam (1998)
  - "Trippin'"
  - "Sitting Home"
- From Soul Food (soundtrack) (1997)
  - "What About Us?" (1997)
- From 3 Strikes (soundtrack) (2000)
  - "Crave" (2000)
- As guest artists
  - LL Cool J - "Loungin' (Who Do U Love?)" (1995)
  - Notorious B.I.G. "Hypnotize" (Pam)
  - Notorious B.I.G "Juicy" (Keisha & Kima)
  - Mase - "What You Want" (1997)
  - Mase - "Stay Out Of My Way" (1999)
  - Foxy Brown - "I Can't" (1998)
  - Tony Touch - "I Wonder Why (He's The Greatest DJ)" (2000)
- Cameos
  - Craig Mack - "Flava In Ya Ear" (Remix) (Keisha from Total) (1994)
  - The Notorious B.I.G. - "One More Chance" / "Stay With Me" (1994)
  - Soul For Real - "Every Little Thing I Do" (1995)
  - 112 - "Only You" Bad Boy Remix (Keisha from Total) (1996)
  - Missy Elliott - "The Rain (Supa Supa Fly)" (1997)
  - Jerome - "Too Old For Me" (Keisha from Total) (1997)
  - Lil' Kim - "Not Tonight" (Remix) (1997)
  - The Lox - "We'll Always Love Big Poppa" (1998)
  - The Bad Boy Family - "You" (2001) [Featuring Pam & Keisha]
