= Hip-hop soul =

Subgenre of contemporary R&B music

- Stylistic origins: Hip-hop; soul; R&B; new jack swing
- Cultural origins: Early 1990s, U.S.
- Derivative forms: Neo soul

Hip-hop soul is a subgenre of contemporary R&B music, most popular during the early and mid 1990s, which fuses R&B or soul singing with hip-hop musical production. The subgenre had evolved from a previous R&B subgenre, new jack swing, which had incorporated hip-hop influences into R&B music. By contrast, hip-hop soul is, as described in The Encyclopedia of African American Music, "quite literally soul singing over hip-hop grooves".

The genre was most popular during the mid and late 1990s with artists such as Mary J. Blige (known as the "Queen of Hip-Hop Soul"), Jodeci, Faith Evans, TLC, and R. Kelly. By the late 1990s, hip-hop soul would lead to the creation of neo soul, which retained the hip-hop and R&B influences while also adding elements of classic 1970s soul music.

== Description ==
Hip-hop soul evolved directly from new jack swing, a form of contemporary R&B popularized by artists and producers such as Teddy Riley and his group Guy, Keith Sweat, and Bobby Brown. New jack swing had incorporated elements of hip-hop music—primarily hip-hop-inspired drum tracks and rapped verses—into contemporary R&B music also heavily inspired by the work of Prince. Hip-hop soul shifted from new jack swing's reliance on synth-heavy production and took the hip-hop/R&B synthesis further by having R&B singers sing directly over the types of sample-heavy backing tracks typically found in contemporary hip-hop recordings like boom bap.

The creation and evolution of hip-hop soul led to an increasingly symbiotic relationship between its parent genres. Hip-hop soul acts presented themselves in styles and personas comparable to those of rappers—dressing in hip-hop fashions and adopting a tougher image than the traditional pop-friendly personas of R&B artists (the existence and popularity of hip-hop soul also had the opposite effect on mainstream rappers, who took on some of the elements of the R&B artists' personas to become more palatable to mainstream audiences). The subgenre increased the popularity of R&B music among the younger hip-hop audience, leading to better sales and airplay success for hip-hop soul recordings versus previous forms of post-disco R&B, on the Billboard pop music sales charts. It also increased the popularity of hip-hop music and culture with older audiences and corporations looking to market urban music. However, the creation of hip-hop soul has been argued by music journalists and fans of R&B music to have "killed off" traditional styles of R&B.

== History ==
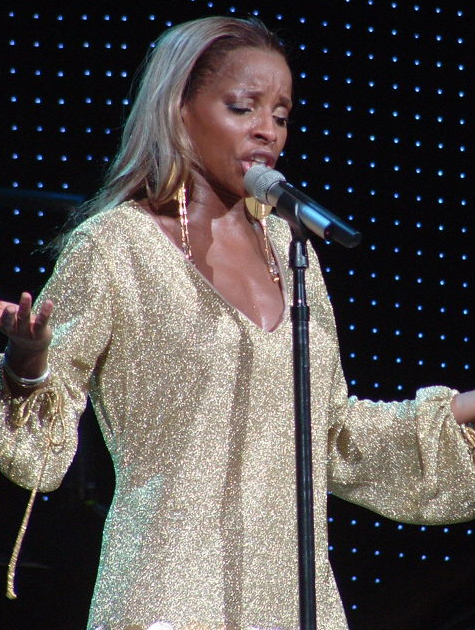
R&B singer Mary J. Blige is known as the "queen of hip-hop soul" due to her frequent collaborations with rappers and hip-hop producers.

The term "hip-hop soul" is attributed to record producer and later rapper Sean "Puffy" Combs, who came up with the term during the promotion of What's the 411?, the 1992 debut album of Uptown Records artist Mary J. Blige. Blige was promoted by the company as the "Queen of Hip-Hop Soul", and her debut album, primarily produced by Combs, was filled with mid-tempo R&B ballads sung over hip-hop beats and samples. Similarly, Diary of a Mad Band (1993), the second album from another Uptown act, Jodeci, featured the four-man male vocal group moving away from its new jack swing origins into hip-hop soul recordings driven more by hip-hop rhythms than melodies. A large number of male acts, both solo performers and groups, followed or competed with Jodeci, among them R. Kelly, 112, Tony! Toni! Toné! and Blackstreet, a second group formed by Teddy Riley.

Hip-hop soul artist Montell Jordan was the first R&B singer signed to hip-hop record label Def Jam Recordings; his 1995 single "This Is How We Do It", built around a sample of Slick Rick's 1989 hip-hop song "Children's Story", typified the sound of the subgenre. Another key recording is "I'll Be There for You/You're All I Need to Get By", a 1995 duet between Wu-Tang rapper Method Man and Mary J. Blige which interpolated Method Man's rapped verses with Blige singing a cover of Marvin Gaye and Tammi Terrell's "You're All I Need to Get By". "I'll Be There For You/You're All I Need to Get By" won the 1996 Grammy Award for Best Rap Performance by a Duo or Group.

The female vocal group TLC, consisting of two singers and a rapper, had their start in new jack swing (dubbed "new jill swing" in their case) with their debut album, Ooooooohhh... On the TLC Tip (1992). Their second album, CrazySexyCool, to which Puffy Combs was a significant contributor, moved the group into the aesthetic of hip-hop soul. Similar female acts of the time included SWV, Adina Howard, Faith Evans, and Total, the latter two acts signed to Puffy Combs' own label, Bad Boy Entertainment.

Hip-hop soul as a distinct subgenre experienced a lull in popularity with the spread of hip-hop influences into more standard R&B music by the end of the 1990s and the emergence of neo soul, an R&B subgenre which blended hip-hop and contemporary R&B with heavier influences from the soul music of the 1960s and 1970s. In the early 2000s, R. Kelly and Jay-Z further popularized the hip-hop soul sound with their chart-topping collaborative album The Best of Both Worlds (2002). Examples of neo soul artists include Tony! Toni! Toné!, D'Angelo, Erykah Badu, and Lauryn Hill. Several newer artists continued to perform in the hip-hop soul subgenre in its original form from the 2000s forward, among them John Legend, Anthony Hamilton, and Keyshia Cole.

== See also ==
- African-American music
