= Violator: The Album, V2.0 =

Compilation album by Violator
- Released: July 24, 2001
- Recorded: 2000–01
- Genre: Hip hop; R&B
- Length: 1:08:37
- Label: Violator; SRC; Loud; Columbia
- Producer: Chris Lighty (exec.); Eric Nicks (also exec.); 7 Aurelius; Bink!; Bryce Wilson; CeeLo Green; Charles "Calogero" Amorelli; D-Roy; Havoc; Irv Gotti; Jonathan "Lighty" Williams; Just Blaze; Reginald "Lickel Reg" Wilkerson; Rich Nice; Scott Storch; Self; Swizz Beatz; The Neptunes; Zukhan Bey

Violator chronology
Violator: The Album (1999)	Violator: The Album, V2.0 (2001)	V3: The Good, the Bad & the Ugly (2004; shelved)

Singles from Violator: The Album, V2.0
- 1. "What It Is" Released: May 1, 2001; 2. "Put Your Hands Up" Released: May 13, 2001

Professional ratings
Review scores
Source	Rating
AllMusic	3/5 stars
Los Angeles Times	3/4 stars
RapReviews	7.5/10
Rolling Stone	3/5 stars

Violator: The Album, V2.0 is the second and final installment in the Violator hip hop compilations series. It was released on July 24, 2001 through Violator/SRC/Loud/Columbia Records as a sequel to 1999's Violator: The Album. Production was handled by several record producers, including Scott Storch, Bink!, Bryce Wilson, Irv Gotti, Just Blaze, 7 Aurelius, and Eric Nicks, who also served as executive producer together with Chris Lighty. It features guest appearances by the likes of JoJo Pellegrino, Remy Ma, Capone-N-Noreaga, Butch Cassidy, Mobb Deep, Big Noyd, CeeLo Green, Fabolous, Fat Joe, Ja Rule, Jadakiss, Kurupt, Memphis Bleek, Missy Elliott, Rah Digga, Spliff Star and Styles P among others. The album debuted at number 10 on the Billboard 200 and number 5 on the Top R&B/Hip-Hop Albums.

The album was supported with two singles: The Neptunes-produced "What It Is" performed by Busta Rhymes & Kelis, which later was included in Genesis, and Swizz Beatz-produced "Put Your Hands Up" performed by LL Cool J, which peaked at #50 on the Hot Rap Songs.

== Track listing ==
No.	Title	Writer(s)	Producer(s)	Length
1.	"Intro"	Richard Jackson	Rich Nice	2:48
2.	"What It Is" (featuring Busta Rhymes and Kelis)	Trevor Smith; Pharrell Williams; Chad Hugo	The Neptunes	3:38
3.	"Grimey" (featuring Noreaga)	Victor Santiago; Williams; Hugo	The Neptunes	4:05
4.	"Put Your Hands Up" (featuring LL Cool J)	James Todd Smith; Kasseem Dean	Swizz Beatz	3:46
5.	"Livin' in da City" (featuring Da Franchise and Butch Cassidy)	Jermaine Denny; Jamal Woolard; Danny Means; Delroy Andrews	D-Roy	3:31
6.	"Come Thru" (featuring Noreaga and Styles P)	Santiago; David Styles; Eddie Seago; Mike Leander	Self	3:28
7.	"We Are" (featuring Funkmaster Flex, Memphis Bleek and Geda K)	Malik Cox; Gary Anthony; Justin Smith	Just Blaze	3:34
8.	"Fiend" (featuring JoJo Pellegrino)	Joseph Edwards; Charles Amorelli; Eric Barrier; William Griffin	Calogero	3:42
9.	"Sexual Chocolate" (featuring CeeLo Green)	Thomas Callaway	CeeLo Green	3:59
10.	"Ex" (featuring Missy Elliott, Ja Rule and Tweet)	Melissa Elliott; Jeffrey Atkins; Charlene Keys; Irving Lorenzo	Irv Gotti; 7 Aurelius	5:04
11.	"U Feel Me/Options" (featuring Havoc, Fat Joe, Remy Ma, Capone and Big Noyd)	Kejuan Muchita; Joseph Cartagena; Reminisce Smith; Kiam Holley; Tajuan Perry; Roosevelt Harrell	Havoc; Bink!	7:20
12.	"Livin' the Life" (featuring Prodigy, Jadakiss and Butch Cassidy)	Albert Johnson; Jason Phillips; Means	Scott Storch	4:02
13.	"Die 3" (featuring The Outfit)	Jonathan Williams; K. Jackson; R. Warmsley; Reginald Wilkerson	Jonathan Lighty; Lickel Reg	3:57
14.	"Grind Season" (featuring JoJo Pellegrino and Kurupt)	Edwards; Ricardo Brown; Amorelli	Calogero	4:26
15.	"Hoppin' in My Car" (featuring Hollyhood)	M. Davis; Bryce Wilson	Bryce Wilson	3:16
16.	"Next Generation" (featuring JoJo Pellegrino, Cadillac Tah, Red Café, Fabolous, Fortune and Remy Ma)	Edwards; Taheem Crocker; Denny; John Jackson; C. Burwell; R. Smith; Darney Rivers; Anthony Carlos Smith; Theodore Riley; Robert Wells; James Brown; Fred Wesley; Joseph Mims	Zukhan Bey; Eric Nicks	3:26
17.	"Can't Get Enough" (featuring Meka, Spliff Star and Rah Digga)	T. Holmes; William Lewis; Rashia Fisher	Scott Storch	4:35
Total length:				1:08:37

Leftover track

- "Violator Run This" featuring Missy Elliott

Notes

- "Intro" features additional vocals from DJ Kay Slay and Kool DJ Red Alert and is missing on LP version
- "Come Thru" contains excerpts from "Early in the Morning" written by Mike Leander and Eddie Seago
- "Fiend" contains excerpts from "Microphone Fiend" written and performed by Eric B. & Rakim
- "U Feel Me/Options" is split on LP version as "U Feel Me" written and performed by Havoc, Fat Joe and Remy Ma, and "Options" written by Capone, Big Noyd and Bink! and performed by Capone and Noyd
- "Next Generation" contains excerpts from "New Generation" written by Darney Rivers, Anthony Carlos Smith, Teddy Riley and Robert Wells and performed by The Classical Two, and "Get on the Good Foot" written by James Brown, Fred Wesley and Joseph Mims and performed by James Brown
- "Can't Get Enough" contains a CD hidden track "Outro" written and produced by Richard "Rich Nice" Jackson featuring additional vocals from Kay Slay and Red Alert

== Charts ==
Chart (2001)	Peak position
US Billboard 200	10
US Top R&B/Hip-Hop Albums (Billboard)	5
