= Christopher Morrison =

British-American director, writer, and producer

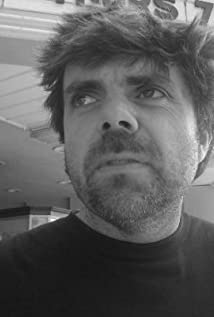
- Born: London, England
- Other name: mink
- Occupations: Film director, comic book novelist, screenwriter, film producer, television producer, music video director
- Years active: 1998–present

Christopher "MINK" Wingfield Morrison is a British-American film director, writer, producer and comic book novelist.

== Career ==
In 2000 he was added to the director roster at Bille Woodruff's production company Geneva Films.

In 2002 he was added to the director roster at Lawrence Bender & Quentin Tarintino's A band Apart production company.

In 2003 he directed the feature film Full Clip for Lionsgate Films.

In 2005 he directed the feature film Into the Sun for Screen Gems Sony Pictures

In 2007 he was attached to direct Mortal Kombat III.

From 2009 to 2014 he founded his own studio including a television partnership with WPT.

In 2016 he directed Golden State Warriors FANNOVATE VR for the NBA.

In 2017 he started Superfiction to create high concept original material for film, television and print .

In 2026 he wrote & directed the feature film The Bus for Starboard Entertainment.

Morrison also has written a number of creator-owned graphic novels for Image Comics, IDW Comics and Dark Horse Comics, including Dust, Dust Wars, 13 Chambers. & Shinjuku with artist Yoshitaka Amano.

== Works ==
=== 1998–2002 Videography (producer or additional photography) incomplete list ===
- TLC – "No Scrubs"
- Ja Rule – "Holla Holla"
- Nas feat. Puff Daddy – "Hate Me Now"
- Missy Elliott – "She's a Bitch"
- Mase feat. Blackstreet – "Get Ready"
- Noreaga – "Oh No"
- Puff Daddy feat. R. Kelly – "Satisfy You"
- Mobb Deep feat. Lil' Kim – "Quiet Storm" (version 2: remix)
- Garbage - "I Think I'm Paranoid"
- Natalie Imbruglia - "Wishing I Was There" (Version 2/U.S. Version)
- Lenny Kravitz - "Thinking of You"
- Madonna - "The Power of Good-Bye"
- Janet Jackson - "Every Time"
- Dr. Dre feat. Snoop Dogg – "Still D.R.E."
- Q-Tip – "Vivrant Thing"
- Ol' Dirty Bastard feat. Kelis – "Got Your Money"
- Sisqó – "Got to Get It"
- Jay-Z feat. UGK – "Big Pimpin'"
- No Doubt – "Ex–Girlfriend"
- Macy Gray – "Why Didn't You Call Me"
- R. Kelly – "Bad Man"
- LL Cool J – "Imagine That"
- Busta Rhymes – "Fire"
- Mýa feat. Jay-Z – "Best of Me (Holla Main Mix)"
- Roni Size & Reprazent – "Who Told You"
- Kobe Bryant feat. Tyra Banks – "K.O.B.E."
- DMX – "Ain't No Sunshine"
- Busta Rhymes feat. Kelis – "What It Is/Grimey"
- Snoop Dogg – "From tha Chuuuch to da Palace"
- Babyface – "There She Goes"
- Lisa "Left Eye" Lopes – "The Block Party"
- Jessica Simpson – "A Little Bit"
- Ginuwine – "Differences"
- FUBU feat. LL Cool J, Keith Murray, and Ludacris – "Fatty Girl"
- Busta Rhymes – "As I Come Back/Break Ya Neck"
- Method Man – "Party & Bull%#!*"
- Aaliyah – "Rock The Boat"
- N*E*R*D – "Rock Star" (unreleased version)
- Queen Latifah-"Paper"
- Brandy featuring Mase "Top of the World"
- Usher "My Way"
- Marilyn Manson "The Dope Show"
- Marilyn Manson "I Don't Like the Drugs (But the Drugs Like Me)"
- Everclear "Father of Mine"
- A Tribe Called Quest "Find a Way"
- Hole "Malibu"
- Lenny Kravitz "Fly Away"
- Faith Evans featuring Puff Daddy"All Night Long"
- Warren G featuring Mack 10"I Want It All"
- Matchbox Twenty"Back 2 Good"
- Will Smith featuring Dru Hill and Kool Moe Dee"Wild Wild West"
- Jennifer Lopez "If You Had My Love"
- Lenny Kravitz"American Woman"
- Enrique Iglesias"Bailamos"
- TLC "Unpretty"
- D'Angelo"Untitled (How Does It Feel)"
- Jennifer Lopez featuring Big Pun and Fat Joe "Feelin' So Good"
- Will Smith"Freakin' It"
- Kelis"Get Along with You"
- Dr. Dre featuring Snoop Dogg"The Next Episode"
- Eminem"The Way I Am"
- Faith Hill"Where Are You, Christmas?"
- Jennifer Lopez"Love Don't Cost a Thing"
- Jay-Z featuring R. Kelly"Guilty Until Proven Innocent"
- Aaliyah"We Need a Resolution"
- Puff Daddy"Bad Boy for Life"
- Jay-Z featuring Beyonce Knowles "03 Bonnie & Clyde"
- Christina Aguilera, Mýa, Lil' Kim, and P!nk "Lady Marmalade"
- Michael Jackson "You Rock My World" Video features actors Marlon Brando, Chris Tucker, Michael Madsen, Billy Drago and introducing Kishaya Dudley

=== 1998–2007 Videography (director) incomplete list ===
- Knowledge – "Clinton Youth" (Remix)
- Knowledge "Destiny"
- Supreme beings of Lesiure "Strange love addiction"
- Face to Face "God is Man"
- Veruca Salt "Born Entertainer"
- Boniface "Cheeky"
- Daniel Bedingfeld "James Dean"
- Lucy Pearl "Without You"
- Rapheal Saadiq "Still Ray"
- Rapheal Saadiq "OPH"
- South Central Cartel "What's his name"
- Slum Village "Call me"
- Slum Village "1,2"
- Master P " Pocket's gonna stay fat "
- Master P " Gold's in they mouth"
- C Murder "I don't give a what"
- C Murder "What Cha Gonna Do"
- Soulja Slim "Get Ya Mind Right"
- Krazy "Thugged out"
- Rondo(outlawz) "Success before Death"
- West Coast Bad Boyz feat Snoop, WC, E-40, Doggpound, Eastsidaz "Pop Lockin"
- Amanda Perez "Candy Kisses"
- Lil Rob "One of Those Days"
- Capone "Summertime Anthem"
- Dead Poetic "Narcotic"
- NBC Hero's Television Show (Season 1) (Add Package)
- Sheryl Crow "Globe Sessions tour"

=== Television series (producer) ===
- "Belle's War" Pilot TV/Game show (Executive Producer - Creative) WPT/ Fox Sports 1 (2014)
- "The Holtzman Presentation" PODCAST SERIES (Producer - Creative) SPOTIFY (2021,2022)

=== Bibliography (writer) ===
- Dust (with Paolo Parente, Image Comics), 2007)
- 13 Chambers (with Denis Medri, Paolo Parente, Image Comics), 2008)
- Shinjuku (with Yoshitaka Amano, Dark Horse Comics, 2010, 2022)
- Dust Wars (with Davide Fabbri, Paolo Parente, Image Comics, 2009, 2010, 2011)
- "Singularity" (with Tom Mandrake, Davide Fabbri, David Atchison, Activision, 2011)
- The Park ( IDW Publishing, 2018, 2019)
- Full Bleed - Film Threat( To Live and Gore in L.A.) (IDW Publishing, 2021)
