= Violator =

Violator may refer to:

- Violator (album), a 1990 album by Depeche Mode
- Violator (band), a Brazilian thrash metal band
- Violator (comics), a character from the Spawn comics
- Violator (company), a hip-hop/R&B management firm, record label
  - Violator: The Album
  - Violator: The Album, V2.0
- Violator (film), a 2014 Philippine film

== See also ==
- The Violators, 1957 film
- Violation (disambiguation)
