= Da Dirty 30 =

Studio album by Cru
- Released: June 24, 1997
- Recorded: 1995–1997
- Studios: Animation Sound (New York, NY)
- Genre: Hip hop
- Length: 1:16:47
- Labels: Def Jam; Violator
- Producers: Chris Lighty (exec.); Yogi

Singles from Da Dirty 30
- 1. "Just Another Case" Released: June 17, 1997; 2. "Bubblin'" Released: August 26, 1997

Professional ratings
Review scores
| Source | Rating |
|---|---|
| AllMusic | 4.5/5 stars |
| RapReviews | 7/10 |

Da Dirty 30 is the only studio album by American hip hop trio Cru. It was released on June 24, 1997, as a joint production by Def Jam Recordings and Violator Entertainment, with the entire production of the album coming from the group's producer Yogi. It features guest appearances from Black Rob, Anthony Hamilton, Antoinette, Jim Hydro, Ras Kass, Slick Rick, The Lox and Tracey Lee. The album was met with positive reviews but was not a huge commercial success, peaking at number 102 on the Billboard 200, number 26 on the Top R&B/Hip-Hop Albums and topped the Top Heatseekers.

Two singles made it to the charts: "Just Another Case", which made it to No. 68 on the Billboard Hot 100, and "Bubblin'", which peaked at No. 23 on the Hot Rap Singles chart.

== Track listing ==
| No. | Title | Writer(s) | Length |
|---|---|---|---|
| 1. | "DJ Footlong (Intro)" | Jeremy A. Graham | 1:46 |
| 2. | "Bluntz & Bakakeemis" (featuring Antoinette, Jim Hydro and Tracey Lee) | Chad Santiago; Graham; Antoinette Patterson; J. Swindell; Tracey Lee; Charles Earland | 3:09 |
| 3. | "That Shit" | Santiago; Anthony Holmes; Graham | 3:27 |
| 4. | "Just Another Case" (featuring Slick Rick) | Santiago; Graham; James Ralph Bailey; Kenneth Williams; Kingsley Swan; Rudolph Clark; Suzanne Swan | 3:35 |
| 5. | "Hoe 2 Society" | Santiago; Graham | 0:57 |
| 6. | "Nuthin' But" (featuring Black Rob) | Santiago; Graham; Robert Ross; William Patrick McCord | 3:18 |
| 7. | "Straight from L.I.P." | Santiago; Holmes; Graham; Adrian Utley; Beth Gibbons; Geoff Barrow; Henry Brooks; Lalo Schifrin; Otis Turner | 3:14 |
| 8. | "Goin' Down" | Santiago; Graham | 2:54 |
| 9. | "Shoot Out" | Santiago; Holmes; Graham | 1:00 |
| 10. | "Ten to Run" | Graham | 1:14 |
| 11. | "Wreckgonize" (featuring Black Rob) | Santiago; Graham; Ross | 3:44 |
| 12. | "Bulletproof Vest" | Santiago; Graham | 0:33 |
| 13. | "The Ebonic Plague" (featuring Ras Kass) | Santiago; Graham; John Austin | 3:52 |
| 14. | "Up North" | Santiago; Holmes; Graham; Stevie Wonder | 3:34 |
| 15. | "R.I.P." | Graham | 0:10 |
| 16. | "Live at the Tunnel" (featuring The Lox) | Santiago; Holmes; Graham; David Styles; Jason Phillips; Sean Jacobs | 3:53 |
| 17. | "Pronto" | Santiago; Holmes; Graham; Claydes Charles Smith; Dennis Thomas; Dennis Lambert; Don Boyce; Duane Hitchings; Franne Golde; George Brown; Richard Westfield; Robert Bell; Robert Mickens; Ronald Bell | 4:16 |
| 18. | "You Used To" | Graham | 0:40 |
| 19. | "Fresh, Wild and Bold" | Santiago; Graham | 3:00 |
| 20. | "O.J." | Graham | 0:43 |
| 21. | "Lisa Lipps" | Santiago; Holmes; Graham | 2:59 |
| 22. | "Bubblin'" | Santiago; Graham | 3:06 |
| 23. | "Goines Tale" | Santiago | 2:37 |
| 24. | "The Illz" | Santiago; Holmes; Graham | 4:19 |
| 25. | "Footlong" | Graham | 0:11 |
| 26. | "My Everlovin'" | Santiago; Graham; Andrew Hale; Helen Folasade Adu; Stuart Matthewman | 3:32 |
| 27. | "Pay Attention" (featuring Anthony Hamilton) | Santiago; Graham; David Frank; Mic Murphy | 3:48 |
| 28. | "Loungin' Wit My Cru" | Santiago; Graham; Aaron Hall; Damion Hall; Teddy Riley; Timmy Gatling | 3:37 |
| 29. | "Dirty 29" | Graham | 0:29 |
| 30. | "Armaggedon" | Santiago; Holmes; Graham | 3:10 |
| Total length: | | | 1:16:47 |

== Personnel ==
- Taj Sidhu – recording, mixing
- Rich Travali – mixing
- Tony Smalios – mixing
- Brian Miller – mixing
- Tom Coyne – mastering
- "Baby" Chris Lighty – executive producer, A&R
- Mark Pitts – associate executive producer, management
- Chad "Chaddio" Santiago – associate executive producer
- Anthony "The Mighty Ha" Holmes – associate executive producer
- Jeremy "Yogi Bear" Graham – associate executive producer
- David "Dave" Lighty – A&R
- Danny Clinch – photography

== Charts ==
| Chart (1997) | Peak position |
|---|---|
| US Billboard 200 | 102 |
| US Top R&B/Hip-Hop Albums (Billboard) | 26 |
| US Heatseekers Albums (Billboard) | 1 |
