= Infringement =

Infringement refers to the violation of a law or a right.

Infringement may refer to:

- Infringement procedure, a European Court of Justice procedure to determine whether a Member State has fulfilled its obligations under Union law
- Intellectual property infringement, violating an owner's exclusive rights to intangible assets such as musical, literary, or artistic works
  - Copyright infringement, the use of works under copyright, including reproducing, distributing, displaying, or performing the copyrighted work without permission
  - Patent infringement, using or selling a patented invention without permission from the patent holder, typically for commercial purposes
  - Trademark infringement, a violation of the exclusive rights attaching to a trademark without the authorization of the trademark owner or licensees
- Secondary infringement, when a party contributes to or is responsible for infringing acts carried out by another party
- Summary offence or infraction, a crime that can be proceeded against without a jury trial and/or indictment in some jurisdictions

== See also ==
- Infringement Festival, an international, interdisciplinary critical arts festival that challenges the commodification of culture
- Violation (disambiguation)
