= Genesis (Busta Rhymes album) =

2001 studio album by Busta Rhymes

Studio album by Busta Rhymes
- Released: November 27, 2001
- Recorded: 2000–2001
- Studios: Armoury, Vancouver; Daddy's House, New York City; Enterprise, New York City; MasterSound, Virginia Beach; Record One, Los Angeles; Right Track, New York City; Soundtrack, New York City
- Genre: Hip hop
- Length: 77:07
- Labels: BMG; J; Flipmode; Violator
- Producers: Battlecat; The Neptunes; Just Blaze; Pete Rock; Dilla; Dre; Diamond D; Mel-Man; Michaelangelo; Nottz; Yogi; Scott Storch

Busta Rhymes chronology
Anarchy (2000)	Genesis (2001)	It Ain't Safe No More... (2002)

Singles from Genesis
- 1. "What It Is" Released: May 1, 2001; 2. "Break Ya Neck" Released: August 25, 2001; 3. "As I Come Back" Released: November 20, 2001; 4. "Pass the Courvoisier, Part II" Released: February 12, 2002

Professional ratings
Aggregate scores
Source	Rating
Metacritic	77/100
Review scores
Source	Rating
AllMusic	4/5 stars
Drowned in Sound	9/10
Entertainment Weekly	B
The Guardian	3/5 stars
HipHopDX	4/5 stars
Los Angeles Times	2.5/4 stars
NME	3/5 stars
Q	3/5 stars
Rolling Stone	3.5/5 stars
Uncut	4/5 stars

Genesis is the fifth studio album by American rapper Busta Rhymes. The album was released on November 27, 2001, by J Records and Busta Rhymes's Flipmode Records. The fourth single from the album, "Pass the Courvoisier, Part II", peaked at number eleven on the Billboard Hot 100. It was included at the end of the album on some later pressings (on which "Ass On Your Shoulders" was removed due to playing time restrictions).

== Commercial performance ==
The album debuted at number 7 on the Billboard 200 with first-week sales of 185,000 copies. It later sold one million domestic copies and certified Platinum by RIAA.

== Track listing ==
Genesis track listing
No.	Title	Writer(s)	Producer(s)	Length
1.	"Intro"	Trevor Smith; Clive Davis; Dominick Lamb	Nottz	2:48
2.	"Everybody Rise Again"	T. Smith; Justin Smith	Just Blaze	4:13
3.	"As I Come Back"	T. Smith; Pharrell Williams; Chad Hugo	The Neptunes	3:19
4.	"Shut 'Em Down 2002"	T. Smith; Peter Phillips; Hank Shocklee; Carlton Riddenhour; Gary Rinaldo	Pete Rock	2:55
5.	"Genesis"	T. Smith; James Yancey	Dilla	3:56
6.	"Betta Stay Up in Your House" (featuring Rah Digga)	T. Smith; Rashia Fisher; Jeremy Graham; Curtis Mayfield	Yogi	3:18
7.	"We Got What You Want"	T. Smith; J. Smith	Just Blaze	3:51
8.	"Truck Volume"	T. Smith; Andre Young; Mike Elizondo; Scott Storch	Dre	3:35
9.	"Pass the Courvoisier" (featuring P. Diddy)	T. Smith; Sean Combs; Jamal Woolard; Jermaine Denny; D. Lamb; Michael Tyler; P. Williams; C. Hugo; Sandy Linzer; Denny Randell; Bernard Edwards; Nile Rodgers; James Jackson; Bryan Higgins; Kamaal Fareed; Ali Shaheed Muhammad; Malik Taylor	Nottz	4:36
10.	"Break Ya Neck"	T. Smith; A. Young; M. Elizondo; S. Storch; Flea; John Frusciante; Anthony Kiedis; Chad Smith	Dre	3:51
11.	"Bounce (Let Me See Ya Throw It)"	T. Smith; M. Elizondo; Melvin Bradford	Mel-Man	3:19
12.	"Holla"	T. Smith; A. Young; M. Elizondo; Camara Kambon	Dre	4:34
13.	"Wife in Law" (featuring Jaheim)	T. Smith; Joseph Kirkland; Ray Parker Jr.	Diamond D	4:03
14.	"Ass on Your Shoulders" (featuring Kokane)	T. Smith; Kevin Gilliam; Jerry Long	Battlecat	4:42
15.	"Make It Hurt"	T. Smith; J. Yancey	J Dilla	3:23
16.	"What It Is" (featuring Kelis)	T. Smith; P. Williams; C. Hugo	The Neptunes	3:38
17.	"There's Only One" (featuring Mary J. Blige)	T. Smith; Mary J. Blige; Michael Angelo Saulsberry	Michaelangelo	4:23
18.	"You Ain't Fuckin' wit Me"	T. Smith; M. A. Saulsberry	Michaelangelo	3:27
19.	"Match the Name with the Voice" (featuring Flipmode Squad)	T. Smith; R. Fisher; Roger McNair; William Lewis; Leroy Jones; J. Smith	Just Blaze	5:59
20.	"Bad Dreams"	T. Smith; D. Lamb	Nottz	3:17
21.	"Pass the Courvoisier, Part II" (featuring P. Diddy and Pharrell)	T. Smith; P. Williams; C. Hugo	The Neptunes	3:19
Total length:				77:07

== Sample credits ==
Samples adapted from liner notes.

- "As I Come Back" contains replayed elements from "Scenario (Remix)" by A Tribe Called Quest featuring Leaders of the New School.
- "Shut 'Em Down" contains elements from "Shut 'Em Down (Pete Rock Remix)", written by Hank Shocklee, Carlton Riddenhour, and Gary Rinaldo, performed by Public Enemy.
- "Betta Stay Up in Your House" contains elements from "Eddie You Should Know Better", written and performed by Curtis Mayfield.
- "Pass the Courvoisier" contains re-sung elements from:
  - "Shake Ya Ass", written by Michael Tyler, Pharrell Williams, and Chad Hugo.
  - "Easy Come, Easy Go", written by Sandy Linzer and Denny Randell.
  - "Rapper's Delight", written by Bernard Edwards and Nile Rodgers.
  - "Scenario", written by James Jackson, Trevor Smith, Bryan Higgins, Kamaal Farreed, Ali Shaheed Muhammad, and Malik Taylor.
- "Break Ya Neck" contains replayed elements from "Give It Away", written by Flea, John Frusciante, Anthony Kiedis, and Chad Smith.
- "Wife In Law" contains re-sung elements from "A Woman Needs Love (Just Like You Do)", written and performed by Ray Parker Jr.

=== Acqua Fragile plagiarism accusation ===
In 2018, Bernardo Lanzetti and his band Acqua Fragile alleged that the song "Genesis" used an uncredited sample of Acqua Fragile's 1974 song "Cosmic Mind Affair". After negotiations with Busta Rhymes' publishers broke down, Lanzetti and Acqua Fragile opted to advance a lawsuit over the issue.

== Charts ==
=== Weekly charts ===
Weekly chart performance for Genesis
Chart (2001–2002)	Peak position
Australian Albums (ARIA)	62
Austrian Albums (Ö3 Austria)	56
Canadian Albums (Nielsen SoundScan)	36
Canadian R&B Albums (Nielsen SoundScan)	9
Dutch Albums (Album Top 100)	47
French Albums (SNEP)	42
German Albums (Offizielle Top 100)	27
Swiss Albums (Schweizer Hitparade)	44
UK Albums (Official Charts)	58
UK R&B Albums (Official Charts)	12
US Billboard 200	7
US Top R&B/Hip-Hop Albums (Billboard)	2

=== Year-end charts ===
Year-end chart performance for Genesis
Chart (2002)	Position
Canadian R&B Albums (Nielsen SoundScan)	83
Canadian Rap Albums (Nielsen SoundScan)	44
US Billboard 200	50
US Top R&B/Hip-Hop Albums (Billboard)	9

== Certifications ==
Certifications for Genesis
Region	Certification	Certified units/sales
United Kingdom (BPI)	Silver	60,000^{^}
United States (RIAA)	Platinum	1,339,000
^{^} Shipments figures based on certification alone.
