= Violator: The Album =

1999 hip hop compilation album

Compilation album by Violator
- Released: August 10, 1999
- Recorded: 1999
- Genre: Hip hop; R&B
- Length: 1:14:15
- Label: Violator; Def Jam 2000
- Producer: The Beatnuts, DJ Scratch, Diamond D, Havoc, Q-Tip, Swizz Beatz

Violator chronology
Violator: The Album (1999)	Violator: The Album, V2.0 (2001)

Singles from Violator: The Album
- 1. "Say What" Released: August 3 1999; 2. "Vivrant Thing" Released: October 5, 1999

Professional ratings
Review scores
Source	Rating
AllMusic	3/5 stars

Violator: The Album is the first installment in the Violator hip hop compilations series. It was released on August 10, 1999 through Violator/Def Jam Recordings. It was the first release through the imprint Violator Records, a spin-off of Mona Scott & Chris Lighty's Violator Management company. A number of then-Violator Management clients and associates appear on the album, among them Q-Tip, Busta Rhymes, and Noreaga.

The LP features production from The Beatnuts, DJ Scratch, Diamond D, Havoc, Nottz, Q-Tip and Swizz Beatz, and featured Busta Rhymes, LL Cool J, Mobb Deep, Ja Rule, The Hot Boys and Mysonne. Violator proved to be a success, making it to #8 on the Billboard 200 and #1 on the Top R&B/Hip-Hop Albums, and spawned one sequel, Violator: The Album, V2.0, in 2001. Q-Tip's "Vivrant Thing", the first solo single for the former A Tribe Called Quest member, was the album's first single and a major pop success. "Say What", by LL Cool J, was the album's second single.

The album was certified gold on September 29, 1999.

== Track listing ==
No.	Title	Writer(s)	Producer(s)	Length
1.	"Intro"		Rich Nice	2:54
2.	"Vivrant Thing" (featuring Q-Tip)	Kamaal Fareed; Barry White	Q-Tip	3:10
3.	"Whatcha Come Around Here For" (featuring Flipmode Squad)	Rashia Tashan Fisher; Leroy Jones; Rahkeim Meyer; Roger McNair; Trevor Smith; Wayne Anthony Notise; William Lewis; Dominick Lamb; Lionel Bart	Nottz	4:13
4.	"I Wanna Fuck You" (featuring Noreaga and Scarlett)	Victor Santiago; Shatiqua Valesquez; Lamont Porter	Ez Elpee	3:55
5.	"Say What" (featuring LL Cool J)	James Todd Smith; Vinnie Biggs; Dennis McCarthy	Vinnie Biggs	3:51
6.	"First Degree" (featuring Da Franchise and Ja Rule)	Jermaine Denny; Jamal Woolard; Kareem Savage; Jeffrey Atkins; Michael Fortunato; Omar Glover; Tony Alives; Leon Huff; Kenneth Gamble	Vibesmen	4:01
7.	"Heavyweights" (featuring Fat Joe, Big Pun and 8Ball)	Joseph Cartagena; Christopher Rios; Premro Smith	T-Mix	4:29
8.	"Ohh Wee" (featuring Cru)	Anthony Holmes; Chad Santiago; Jeremy A. Graham; Adam Keefe Horovitz; Adam Yauch; Michael Diamond; Rick Rubin	Yogi "Sugar Bear" Graham	3:52
9.	"Do What Playas Do" (featuring Mysonne, Ma$e and 8Ball)	Mysonne Linen; Mason Betha; P. Smith	Mo-Suave' House Productions	4:08
10.	"Nobody Likes Me" (featuring Mobb Deep)	Albert Johnson; Kejuan Muchita	Havoc	4:05
11.	"Nobody" (featuring Next and Mysonne)	Raphael Brown; Robert Huggar; Terry Brown; Linen; Eric Johnson; Christopher Jennings	Eric Johnson; Christopher Jennings	4:45
12.	"Thugged Out Niggaz" (featuring Capone-N-Noreaga, Final Chapter, Imam Thug, Scarlett and Maze & Musaliny)	V. Santiago; Brandon Burke; Michael Butler; Kiam Holley; Shatiqua Velasquez; Michael Allen; Musa Abdallah; Kevin Ravenell	Kyze	3:42
13.	"Shit That He Said" (featuring Big Noyd)	Tajuan Perry; Muchita; Renaldo Benson; L. Perry	Havoc	3:48
14.	"Beatnuts Forever" (featuring The Beatnuts and Triple Seis)	Lester Fernandez; Jerry Tineo; Sammy Garcia; Danny Wolfe	The Beatnuts	3:05
15.	"What My Niggas Want" (featuring Cam'ron and Busta Rhymes)	Cameron Giles; T. Smith; Darrell Branch	Darrell "Digga" Branch; Lance 'Un' Rivera	2:41
16.	"The Truth" (featuring Mysonne)	Linen; Robert 'Shim' Kirkland	Robert 'Shim' Kirkland	4:13
17.	"Who Can I Trust" (featuring Cormega and Lil Wayne)	Cory McKay; Alan Maman; Jonathan Williams; Isaac Hayes	Alchemist; Jonathan Lighty	4:02
18.	"Bus-A-Bus (Diamond D Remix)" (featuring Busta Rhymes)	T. Smith; George Spivey	DJ Scratch	3:33
19.	"Violators" (featuring L Boogie, Sonja Blade, Noreaga, Mysonne, Prodigy and Busta Rhymes)	Lordikim Allah; Sonja Shenelle Holder; V. Santiago; Linen; A. Johnson; T. Smith; Kasseem Dean	Swizz Beatz	5:37
20.	"Outro"			0:11
Total length:				1:14:15

== Charts ==
=== Weekly charts ===
Chart (1999)	Peak position
US Billboard 200	8
US Top R&B/Hip-Hop Albums (Billboard)	1

=== Year-end charts ===
Chart (1999)	Position
US Billboard 200	169
US Top R&B/Hip-Hop Albums (Billboard)	63

== Certifications ==
Region	Certification	Certified units/sales
United States (RIAA)	Gold	500,000^{^}
^{^} Shipments figures based on certification alone.

== See also ==
- List of Billboard number-one R&B albums of 1999
