= Spontaneous conception (psychology) =

Ideas people form without education

In psychology, spontaneous conception refers to conceptions about the world that we form without any formal education. Often these are connected with physics. They may be wrong concepts, like "heavier objects fall faster" or "bigger objects are heavier". Piaget thinks they are made by introspection. Vygotsky believes they may help the learning of scientific concepts more than having no conception about one event.
