= Deep Blue Sea (soundtrack) =

Soundtrack album by Various artists
- Released: July 27, 1999
- Recorded: 1999
- Genre: Hip hop; R&B
- Length: 45:00
- Label: Warner Bros. 9 47485-2
- Producer: Various artists

Singles from Deep Blue Sea
- 1. "Say What" Released: August 3, 1999; 2. "Deepest Bluest" Released: 1999; 3. "Just Because" Released: 1999; 4. "El Paraiso Rico" Released: 1999; 5. "Remote Control Soul" Released: 1999

Professional ratings
Review scores
Source	Rating
Allmusic	3/5 stars

Deep Blue Sea is the soundtrack to the 1999 science fiction horror film Deep Blue Sea. It was released on June 27, 1999, through Warner Bros. Records and consisted of hip hop and R&B music. The soundtrack didn't find much success, only making it to #55 on the Top R&B/Hip-Hop Albums. The lone single was LL Cool J's non-charting "Deepest Bluest".

== Track listing ==
1. "Deepest Bluest"- 4:22 - LL Cool J
2. "Smokeman"- 2:39 - Smokeman
3. "I Found Another Man"- 4:11 - Natice
4. "Remote Control Soul"- 4:22 - Bass Odyssey
5. "Mega's on His Own"- 5:16 - Cormega (ft. Carl Thomas)
6. "Come Home with Me"- 3:50 - Amyth
7. "Say What"- 3:43 - LL Cool J
8. "Burn Baby Burn"- 3:35 - Simone Starks
9. "Just Because"- 4:10 - F.A.T.E.
10. "Get tha Money"- 4:27 - Hi-C (ft. DJ Quik)
11. "I Can See Clearly Now"- 5:15 - Chantel Jones
12. "El Paraiso Rico"- 3:27 - Deetah
13. "Good and Plenty"- 3:49 - Divine
14. "Deep Blue Sea Montage"- 6:12 - Trevor Rabin
