= Wayne Barrow =

American film producer, talent manager, and businessman

- Born: April 2, 1965 (age 61); Brooklyn, New York, U.S.
- Occupations: Film producer, talent manager, businessman
- Years active: 1991–present
- Employers: ByStorm Entertainment; Barrow Films; Notorious Ventures
- Known for: Manager of The Notorious B.I.G. and J. Cole, Producer of Notorious, Blue, Kicks, BIGGIE: I Got A Story To Tell and City Of Lies.
- Children: Cheyenne Barrow; Nina Barrow

Wayne Barrow (born April 2, 1965) is an American film producer, talent manager, and businessman. He is the founder and co-owner of ByStorm Entertainment. He is the CEO of Barrow Films, CEO of Brooklyns Finest, CEO of StormTroopers Entertainment, and vice chairman of The Christopher Wallace Memorial Foundation.

== Career ==
Barrow began his career as a hospital corpsman in the United States Navy as a petty officer. After eight years in the Navy, Barrow began a new career in the music business by teaming up with Mark Pitts, where he managed business operations of his company, Mark Pitts Management. Their clients included Changing Faces, Shyne, Queen Pen, LooN, NAS and the Notorious B.I.G. During a Q and A session which he held on the set of Notorious, Barrow stated that he first met B.I.G. through his cousin Mark Pitts, who used to intern for Sean "Puff Daddy" Combs while working at Bad Boy Records. He secured a deal with EMI Publishing with Aqil Davidson of Wreckx-N-Effect.

In 1998, he became the president of Bystorm Entertainment, a record label that he founded with Mark Pitts, to sign up-and-coming artists. He signed rapper Tracey Lee and launched his debut album, “Many Faces”, with Universal Records, which gave the initial success to the company. The album sold 500,000 copies. They entered into a joint venture with RCA Records and signed Miguel, Mali-Music, Ro-James, and J.Cole.

Barrow has also produced movies, including Notorious, Blue, Kicks, BIGGIE I Got A Story To Tell and City Of Lies. During his career, he has managed recording artists such as Wreckx-N-Effect, J.Cole, Miguel, Loon, Shyne, Ro-James, Kardinal Offishall, and The Notorious B.I.G., who was also known as Biggie Smalls.

In 2025, Barrow sued Faith Evans on behalf of the late Voletta Wallace’s estate that he oversees.

== Discography ==
Year	Album	Artist	Credit
2017	War & Leisure	Miguel	Associate Producer
2017	The Transition of Mali	Mali Music	Associate Executive Producer
2017	Hip-Hop History: The Collection		Producer
2016	Eldorado	Ro James	Associate Producer
2016	20 Years - The Box Set		Producer
2015	Wildheart	Miguel	Associate Producer
2013	Born Sinner	J. Cole	Management
2012	R&B: The Collection		Producer
2012	Kaleidoscope Dream	Miguel	Executive Producer
2010	All I Want Is You	Miguel	Executive Producer
2009	Notorious		Executive Producer, A&R
2007	Running Your Mouth	The Notorious B.I.G.	Executive Producer
2007	Greatest Hits	The Notorious B.I.G.	Executive Producer, Producer
2005	Duets: The Final Chapter	The Notorious B.I.G.	Producer, executive producer
