= Just Another Case =

Single by Cru featuring Slick Rick

from the album Da Dirty 30
- B-side: "Pronto"
- Released: June 17, 1997
- Recorded: 1996
- Studio: Animation Sound (New York, NY)
- Genre: Hip hop
- Length: 3:35
- Label: Def Jam
- Songwriters: Jeremy Graham; Chad Santiago; Suzanne Swan; Kingsley Swan; Ralph Bailey; Rudy Clark; Ken Williams; Ricky Walters
- Producer: Yogi "Sugar Bear" Graham

Cru singles chronology
"Just Another Case" (1997)	"Bubblin'" (1997)

Slick Rick singles chronology
"Got to Give It Up" (1996)	"Just Another Case" (1997)	"Unify" (1998)

"Just Another Case" is song by American hip hop group Cru featuring a verse from Slick Rick. It was released on June 17, 1997, through Violator/Def Jam Recordings as the lead single from their debut album Da Dirty 30. Recording sessions took place at Animation Sound in New York City. Production was handled by member Yogi Bear, who used a sample of "The World Is a Place" performed by Rhythm, an interpolation of "Everybody Plays the Fool" performed by The Main Ingredient, and a sample of "Children's Story" performed by Slick Rick.

The single reached number 68 on the Billboard Hot 100, number 28 on the Hot R&B/Hip-Hop Songs, number 65 on the R&B/Hip-Hop Airplay, and number 8 on the Hot Rap Songs in the United States

== Track listing ==
No.	Title	Length
1.	"Just Another Case" (Radio Edit)
2.	"Just Another Case" (Instrumental)
3.	"Just Another Case" (Remix Radio)
4.	"Just Another Case" (Remix Instrumental)
5.	"Pronto" (LP Version)

== Charts ==
Chart (1997)	Peak position
US Billboard Hot 100	68
US Hot R&B/Hip-Hop Songs (Billboard)	28
US R&B/Hip-Hop Airplay (Billboard)	65
US Hot Rap Songs (Billboard)	8
