= As I Come Back =

2001 single by Busta Rhymes

Single by Busta Rhymes

from the album Genesis
- A-side: "Break Ya Neck"
- Released: November 20, 2001
- Genre: Hip-hop
- Length: 3:19
- Label: J; Flipmode; Violator
- Songwriters: Trevor Smith; Pharrell Williams; Charles Hugo
- Producer: The Neptunes

Busta Rhymes singles chronology
"Break Ya Neck" (2001)	"As I Come Back" (2001)	"Pass the Courvoisier, Part II" (2001)

"As I Come Back" is a song by American rapper Busta Rhymes. It was released as the third single from his fifth studio album Genesis on November 20, 2001, by J Records and Busta Rhymes's Flipmode Records.

== Composition ==
"As I Come Back" was composed in 4/4 time and the key of B major, with a tempo of 96 beats per minute. It has a duration time of three minutes and twenty seconds.

== Music video ==
No official music video was released for “As I Come Back.” However, the first verse and hook of the song were featured in the music video for “Break Ya Neck,” directed by Hype Williams and released on October 16, 2001. The segment of the “Break Ya Neck” video that includes “As I Come Back” also features cameo appearances by Swizz Beatz, Lil Jon, Spliff Star, Rampage, and Rah Digga.

== Charts ==
Chart (2001)	Peak position
US Hot R&B/Hip-Hop Songs (Billboard)	91
US Hot Rap Songs (Billboard)	7
