= Eric Nicks =

Founder of Alpine Music Group and music industry veteran

Eric Nicks is the founder of Alpine Music Group, home to R&B sensation Justine Skye. Eric Nicks is a music industry veteran, having been named the Sr. VP of A&R at Universal Motown. He also founded R&B Live NY, an industry showcase in New York City. Nicks sits on the board of advisors for the Brooklyn Academy of Music. He is often a guest speaker at a variety of colleges, including NYU, Morehouse, and many others. On top of founding Alpine Music Group, Eric also created a bowling app called Side Action Bowling.

== Career ==
Eric Nicks graduated from New York University and began co-managing the sister of his best friend, up and coming rapper, Foxy Brown. In ‘96 Nicks received a call from Lyor Cohen and Chris Lighty, offering him an A&R position at Violator (company) Records and Management where he would help shape the careers of LL Cool J, Busta Rhymes, and Noreaga among others. After spending 5 years at Violator, Lighty named him President of the records division until he stepped off to start a management company, EVision, with LL Cool J as one of his clients.

He was involved in the platinum releases of Foxy Brown’s Ill NaNa, LL Cool J’s The DEFinition, and Lyfe Jennings’ debut Lyfe 268-192. Eric Nicks received a tap from Kevin Liles, former president of Def Jam, for a position as Vice President of A&R at Def Jam. Under Nicks’ tenure at Def Jam, LL dropped his 10th studio album titled "10" which included LL Cool J's 1st #1 single “Love You Better.” and 11th studio album "The Definition" which included LL's 2nd #1 single "Headsprung" and 3rd #1 single "All I Need" featuring Jennifer Lopez. In 2003, Nicks left Def Jam to become Sr. Vice President of A&R at Sony Records where he A&R'd Lyfe Jennings Platinum debut album "268-192". He went on to become Sr. VP of A&R at Universal Motown Records in 2006.

In 2007, Eric Nicks created R&B Live New York. Since its inception, R&B Live has hosted artists such as Fantasia, Ne-Yo, Trey Songz, Brian McKnight and many more. The star-studded room has included Kevin Liles, Jay-Z, Denzel Washington, Terrence Howard and many other celebrities and industry executives.

2008 marked the conception of Brookland Entertainment, Eric Nicks’ own record label company formed in conjunction with the Trackmasters. Brookland Entertainment was home to the hit single "Download" by Lil' Kim ft. T-Pain and Charlie Wilson and dancehall artist Beenie Man.

In 2010 Eric Nicks founded Alpine Music Group, which includes a self owned management company, a joint venture publishing company with Sony/ATV and a Record Label under Atlantic Records which houses upcoming sensation Justine Skye. In 2010 Eric also founded Alpine Music Publishing which houses records from Justine Bieber "U Smile", One Direction "Gotta Be you", Justine Skye "Collide" and many more.

== A&R Discography ==
Artist	Album	Label	Year
Foxy Brown	Ill Nana	Violator/Def Jam	1996
Foxy Brown	Chyna Doll	Violator/Def Jam	1999
Various Artists	Violator Compilation	Violator/Def Jam	1999
Various Artists	Violator Compilation V2.0	Violator/Def Jam	2001
LL Cool J	The DEFinition	Def Jam	2004
Lyfe Jennings	Lyfe 268-192	Sony	2004
