= Shut 'Em Down (LL Cool J song) =

Single by LL Cool J

from the album Music From and Inspired by the Motion Picture Any Given Sunday
- Released: February 1, 2000
- Genre: Hip hop
- Length: 3:20
- Label: Atlantic
- Songwriters: James Todd Smith; George Spivey
- Producers: DJ Scratch; LL Cool J (co.)

LL Cool J singles chronology
"Deepest Bluest" (1999)	"Shut 'Em Down" (2000)	"Imagine That" (2000)

"Shut 'Em Down" is a hip hop song by American rapper LL Cool J. It was released on February 1, 2000 via Atlantic Records as a single from Music From and Inspired by the Motion Picture Any Given Sunday soundtrack album. Production was handled by DJ Scratch with LL Cool J serving as co-producer. An accompanying music video was directed by Dave Meyers.

In the United States, the song peaked at No. 88 on the Hot R&B/Hip-Hop Songs and No. 31 on the Hot Rap Songs.

== Track listing ==
12"
No.	Title	Length
1.	"Shut 'Em Down" (Radio Mix)
2.	"Shut 'Em Down" (Video Mix)
3.	"Shut 'Em Down" (Clean Acapella)
4.	"Shut 'Em Down" (LP Version)
5.	"Shut 'Em Down" (Instrumental)
6.	"Shut 'Em Down" (Acapella)

CDS
No.	Title	Writer(s)	Producer(s)	Length
1.	"Shut 'Em Down (Radio Edit)" (performed by LL Cool J)	James Todd Smith; George Spivey	DJ Scratch; LL Cool J (co.)
2.	"Be a Man (Radio Edit)" (performed by Hole)	Courtney Love; Eric Erlandson; Billy Corgan	Michael Beinhorn; Hole
3.	"Shut 'Em Down (Album Version)" (performed by LL Cool J)	Smith; Spivey	DJ Scratch; LL Cool J (co.)
4.	"Be a Man (Album Version)" (performed by Hole)	Love; Erlandson; Corgan	Michael Beinhorn; Hole

== Personnel ==
- James Todd "LL Cool J" Smith – songwriter, vocals, co-producer
- George "DJ Scratch" Spivey – songwriter, producer
- Chris Ribando – Pro Tools engineering
- Ken "Duro" Ifill – mixing
- Tony Dawsey – mastering

== Charts ==
Chart (2000)	Peak position
US Hot R&B/Hip-Hop Songs (Billboard)	88
US Hot Rap Songs (Billboard)	31
