= You and Me (LL Cool J song) =

Single by LL Cool J featuring Kelly Price

from the album G.O.A.T.
- B-side: "Fuhgidabowdit"
- Released: October 17, 2000
- Recorded: 2000
- Genre: R&B; hip hop
- Length: 4:58
- Label: Def Jam
- Songwriter: James Todd Smith
- Producers: DJ Scratch; LL Cool J

LL Cool J singles chronology
"Imagine That" (2000)	"You and Me" (2000)	"Put Your Hands Up" (2001)

"You and Me" is a song by LL Cool J, released as a single from his ninth album, G.O.A.T.. It was released on October 17, 2000 for Def Jam Recordings, was produced by DJ Scratch and LL Cool J, and featured R&B singer Kelly Price. It peaked at #44 on the Billboard's Hot Rap Singles and #59 on the Hot R&B/Hip-Hop Songs.

== Track listing ==
=== A-side ===
1. "You and Me" (Radio Edit)
2. "You and Me" (LP Version)
3. "You and Me" (Instrumental)
  - Contains a sample from the recording "You'll Never Know" by Hi-Gloss.

=== B-side ===
1. "Fuhgidabowdit" featuring Method Man, Redman, DMX (Radio Edit)
2. "Fuhgidabowdit" (LP Edit)
3. "Fuhgidabowdit" (Instrumental)

== Charts ==
Chart performance for "You and Me"
Chart (2001)	Peak position
Australia (ARIA)	95
Germany (GfK)	32
Netherlands (Dutch Top 40)	39
Netherlands (Single Top 100)	49
Switzerland (Schweizer Hitparade)	85
US Hot R&B/Hip-Hop Songs (Billboard)	59
US Hot Rap Songs (Billboard)	44
