= Permission (song) =

2015 single by Ro James

Single by Ro James

from the album Eldorado
- Released: November 20, 2015
- Genre: R&B
- Length: 4:38
- Label: ByStorm; RCA
- Songwriter(s): Ronnie Tucker; Kenneth C. Coby; Kortney Lucas; Maurice Simmonds; Willie Hutch
- Producer(s): Soundz

Ro James singles chronology
"Permission" (2015)	"Far Away" (2016)

Music video
- "Permission" on YouTube

"Permission" is the debut single by American singer Ro James, released on November 20, 2015 as the lead single from his debut studio album Eldorado (2016). Produced by Soundz, the song contains a sample of "Brothers Gonna Work It Out" by Willie Hutch.

== Background ==
The decision to release the song was one of the more divisive for Ro James. He said, "We had con-ver-sa-tions about 'Permission'. I felt like it was too simple. I have to give that to Mark Pitts for calling that, because I argued that to the end. I thought it was a great song. I just didn't know it was going to do this."

== Composition ==
The song borrows a guitar riff sampled from "Brothers Gonna Work It Out" in the production, while the lyrics revolve around receiving sexual consent. Ro James' voice reaches a "raspy, scratchy" falsetto, before returning to "weighty" mid-tones.

Regarding the impact of the song, James stated:

I think "Permission" connected because it bridges the gap from old school people who appreciate Willie Hutch and the movie The Mack and those people who've heard it before, and soul, feeling and emotion, then it connects to the youth in the sense of that bass, that knock, that high hat and that ride. And then that melody brings everybody together.

== Critical reception ==
Elias Leight of Rolling Stone gave a positive review, commenting "When the guitar is paired with a simple beat, the spark is immediate. James works with a gliding falsetto and a thirsty but deferential mid-register. The song doesn't have much of a bridge, but it doesn't need one."

== Music video ==
The music video was released alongside the single and shot in black and white. It follows Ro James and his girlfriend riding through Los Angeles and spending an evening in Hollywood Hills.

== Remixes ==
American rapper Styles P released a remix of the song on April 2, 2016.

== Charts ==
Chart performance for "Permission"
Chart (2016)	Peak position
US Bubbling Under Hot 100 (Billboard)	17
US Hot R&B/Hip-Hop Songs (Billboard)	37
