= Say What (LL Cool J song) =

Single by LL Cool J

from the album Violator: The Album
- B-side: "First Degree, Violators"
- Released: August 3, 1999
- Genre: Hip hop
- Length: 3:51
- Label: Violator; Def Jam
- Songwriter(s): James Todd Smith
- Producer(s): Vinnie Biggs

LL Cool J singles chronology
"Incredible" (1998)	"Say What" (1999)	"Deepest Bluest" (1999)

"Say What" is a single by LL Cool J from the hip-hop compilation, Violator: The Album. It was released on August 3, 1999 for Violator Records and Def Jam Recordings and featured production from Vinnie Biggs. In addition to Violator: The Album, "Say What" would also make an appearance on the Deep Blue Sea soundtrack, a film starring LL Cool J.

== Track listing ==
=== A-side ===
1. "Say What" (Radio Edit)(LL Cool J)
2. "First Degree" (Radio Edit) (Da Franchise, Ja Rule)
3. "Violators" (Radio Edit) (Busta Rhymes, Noreaga, Prodigy, L. Boogie, Mysonne, Sonja Blade

=== B-side ===
1. "Say What" (Instrumental)
2. "First Degree" (Instrumental)
3. "Violators" (Instrumental)
