= Pass the Courvoisier, Part II =

2002 single by Busta Rhymes featuring P. Diddy and Pharrell

Single by Busta Rhymes featuring P. Diddy and Pharrell

from the album Genesis
- Released: February 12, 2002
- Recorded: 2001
- Genre: Hip-hop
- Length: 3:19
- Label: Flipmode; J
- Songwriters: Trevor Smith; Jermaine Denny; Pharrell Williams; Charles Hugo
- Producer: The Neptunes

Busta Rhymes singles chronology
"As I Come Back" (2001)	"Pass the Courvoisier, Part II" (2002)	"Make It Clap" (2002)

P. Diddy singles chronology
"Trade It All, Pt. 2" (2002)	"Pass the Courvoisier, Part II" (2002)	"I Need a Girl (Part One)" (2002)

Pharrell singles chronology
"Formal Invite" (2002)	"Pass the Courvoisier, Part II" (2002)	"Nothin'" (2002)

"Pass the Courvoisier, Part II" is a song by American rapper Busta Rhymes featuring P. Diddy and Pharrell Williams. It was released on February 12, 2002, by Flipmode Entertainment and J Records as the fourth and last single from Rhymes's fifth studio album Genesis. The song is a continuation to an album track off of Genesis, also featuring P. Diddy.

== Music video ==
The video, inspired by Harlem Nights and Rush Hour 2, featured cameos from Mr. T, Spliff Star, Mo'Nique, Kym Whitley and Jamie Foxx.

== Chart performance ==
The song peaked at No. 11 on the Billboard Hot 100 and No. 16 on the UK Singles Chart.

== Legacy ==
In 2025, the song was sampled by rapper Tyler, the Creator on the song "Big Poe" featuring Pharrell Williams, (stylized as Sk8brd on Spotify and YouTube)

== Charts ==
=== Weekly charts ===
Chart (2002)	Peak position
Australia (ARIA)	43
Australian Urban (ARIA)	12
Canada (Nielsen SoundScan)	30
Germany (GfK)	27
Ireland (IRMA)	34
Netherlands (Single Top 100)	47
Switzerland (Schweizer Hitparade)	58
UK Singles (OCC)	16
UK Hip Hop/R&B (OCC)	4
US Billboard Hot 100	11
US Hot R&B/Hip-Hop Songs (Billboard)	4
US Hot Rap Songs (Billboard)	5

=== Year-end charts ===
Chart	Position
Canada (Nielsen SoundScan)	198
UK Urban (Music Week)	8
US Hot R&B/Hip-Hop Songs (Billboard)	19

== Release history ==
Region	Date	Format(s)	Label(s)	Ref.
United States	February 18, 2002	Rhythmic contemporary · urban contemporary radio	J	
