= Amplified (Q-Tip album) =

Studio album by Q-Tip
- Released: November 30, 1999
- Recorded: 1998–99
- Studios: The Hit Factory, New York City
- Genre: Hip-hop
- Length: 47:30
- Label: Arista
- Producers: Jay Dee; Q-Tip; DJ Scratch

Q-Tip chronology
Amplified (1999)	The Renaissance (2008)

Singles from Amplified
- 1. "Vivrant Thing" Released: October 5, 1999; 2. "Breathe and Stop" Released: January 25, 2000; 3. "Let's Ride" Released: 2000

Amplified is the debut solo studio album by American rapper Q-Tip, released on November 30, 1999, through Arista Records. It was recorded following the disbandment of his former group A Tribe Called Quest in 1998, and the production was primarily handled by himself and Jay Dee of the Ummah. The album spawned the Billboard Hot 100 singles "Vivrant Thing" and "Breathe and Stop".

The album debuted at number 28 on the Billboard 200, and on January 5, 2000, it was certified gold by the Recording Industry Association of America, for shipments of 500,000 copies in the United States. As of July 2008, Amplified has sold 675,000 copies in the US. It received generally positive reviews from music critics.

== Background ==
Recorded after the dissolution of Q-Tip's former group, A Tribe Called Quest, Amplified marked a stylistic departure for Q-Tip; writer Kembrew McLeod noted, "fans of Tribe's rootsy aesthetic were caught off guard" by Q-Tip's "transformation from abstract poet to libidinous, brand-conscious baller." The album was primarily produced by Q-Tip and Jay Dee of The Ummah, who had previously collaborated for production on A Tribe Called Quest's Beats, Rhymes and Life and The Love Movement albums.

== Music and lyrics ==
Building on the jazzy R&B sound of The Love Movement, many of Amplified's beats were initiated by Jay Dee, with Q-Tip adding some final touches to it; "When we would work together, he would have it, like, 75 percent there and I would add a kick or bass line". Jon Pareles of The New York Times noted Q-Tip's lyrics as typified by boasts and playful seduction raps, however, on some tracks, he maintained the philosophical abstract lyricism that he was previously known for. The hip hop community criticized the album as a "glitzy, commercial reach."

== Reception ==
Professional ratings
Review scores
Source	Rating
AllMusic	4.5/5 stars
Entertainment Weekly	A−
Los Angeles Times	3/4 stars
Muzik	4/5 stars
NME	8/10
Pitchfork	6.8/10
Q	4/5 stars
Rolling Stone	3.5/5 stars
Spin	3.5/5 stars
USA Today	3.5/4 stars

Amplified debuted at number 28 on the Billboard 200, selling over 89,000 copies in its first week. On January 5, 2000, it was certified gold by the Recording Industry Association of America, for shipments of 500,000 copies in the United States. As of July 2008, Amplified has sold 675,000 copies in the US.

Amplified received generally positive reviews from music critics. AllMusic's John Bush hailed it as "an excellent work", with a production style that "emphasizes deep grooves and clipped beats with a polished sheen that takes Tribe's jazz-rap into the age of quiet storm and fusion." Bush also called Q-Tip's rapping "as smooth and inventive as ever." Colin Ross of PopMatters described it as "a vibe-orientated affair", noting that its "infectious hooks, Jay Dee's trademark keys, and some seriously funky beats all work to create a captivating soundscape upon which Q-Tip drops his traditionally abstract rhymes." The Village Voice's Robert Christgau felt that the album's production suited Q-Tip better than that of A Tribe Called Quest albums, stating, "He gets stronger music out of hard beats than he ever did out of soft jazz." Soren Baker of the Los Angeles Times sensed "creative growth" from Q-Tip, praising the album as "an eclectic and enjoyable hip-hop experience." Writing for NME, John Mulvey initially believed that Amplified followed the mainstream "millennial hip-hop formula to the point of near anonymity", however, he concluded that it lived up to the high expectations of a Q-Tip album, calling the production a "brilliant hybrid of the organic and the modernist." Kris Ex of Rolling Stone summed it up as "stew-pot hip-hop – traditional blunts, broads and braggadocio filtered through Tip's abstract lens." Taylor M. Clark of Pitchfork felt that, lyrically, Q-Tip "regressed substantially", with rhymes that were "less crafty and more repetitive than any of his past works."

Christgau ranked Amplified number 12 on his "Dean's List" for The Village Voice's Pazz & Jop critics' poll of 1999. In a retrospective review, Thomas Golianopoulos of Spin perceived that the album "aged quite well", further writing, "Though the tawdry booty videos for singles 'Breathe and Stop' and 'Vivrant Thing' bothered Tribe loyalists, 'Wait Up,' and 'Higher' maintain the group's ethos and hint at Tip's later unreleased work (Kamaal the Abstract and Open)." Kembrew McLeod, writing in The New Rolling Stone Album Guide, stated, "Although it may not have the staying power of Tribe's classics, Amplified is the ideal soundtrack for a carefree night at the club."

== Track listing ==
- All tracks produced by Jay Dee and Q-Tip, except tracks 9 and 11 produced by DJ Scratch.

No.	Title	Writer(s)	Length
1.	"Wait Up"	Kamaal Fareed, James Yancey	3:43
2.	"Higher"	Fareed, Yancey	3:30
3.	"Breathe and Stop"	Fareed, Yancey, Robert Bell, George "Funky" Brown, Roy Handy, Robert Mickens, Gene Redd Jr., Claydes Smith, Dennis Thomas, Richard Westfield	4:03
4.	"Moving with U"	Fareed, Yancey	3:22
5.	"Let's Ride"	Fareed, Yancey	4:07
6.	"Things U Do"	Fareed, Yancey	4:06
7.	"All In"	Fareed, Yancey	3:08
8.	"Go Hard"	Fareed, Yancey	3:02
9.	"Do It"	Rémy Bellenchombre, Fareed, Jean-Marc Monnerville, George Spivey	2:51
10.	"Vivrant Thing"	Fareed, Barry White, Yancey	3:11
11.	"N.T." (featuring Busta Rhymes)	Fareed, Trevor Smith Jr., Spivey	3:54
12.	"End of Time" (featuring Korn)	Jonathan Davis, Fareed, Yancey	3:57
13.	"Do It, See It, Be It" (hidden track)	Fareed, Yancey	4:35

Sample credits

Sampling information for Amplified adapted from The-Breaks.

- "Higher" contains a sample from "Wonderin'" by Roy Haynes
- "Breathe and Stop" contains samples from "By Myself" by Urszula Dudziak, "N.T." by Kool & the Gang and "Gypsy" by Emmett Chapman
- "Let's Ride" contains samples from "Giant Steps" by Joe Pass, "UFO" by ESG and "The Humpty Dump" by The Vibrettes
- "All In" contains a sample from "Leo: Rosebud" by Cannonball Adderley
- "Go Hard" contains a sample from "M3000 (Opus VI)" by Mandre
- "Do It" contains a sample from "La Biguine Des Enfants Du Bon Dieu" by Kali
- "Vivrant Thing" contains a sample from "I Wanna Stay" by Love Unlimited Orchestra

== Personnel ==
Credits for Amplified adapted from liner notes.

- Chris Athens – mastering
- B+ – photography
- Lesvia Castro – production coordinator
- DJ Scratch – producer (track 9, 11)
- Drew Dixon – A&R
- Drew Fitzgerald – art direction
- Miriam Gonzales – production coordinator
- Jason Groucott – engineer
- Ken "Duro" Ifill – mixing, engineer
- Jay Dee – producer (track 1 to 8, 10, 12, 13)
- Micheline Levine – legal
- Chris Lighty – management
- Glenn Marchese – mixing (track 10), engineer
- Q-Tip – producer (track 1 to 8, 10, 12, 13), mixing
- Mona Scott – management
- Shaka – management
- Steve Souder – engineer
- Christopher Stern – art direction

== Charts ==
=== Weekly charts ===
Chart (1999)	Peak position
UK Albums (Official Charts)	88
US Billboard 200	28
US Top R&B/Hip-Hop Albums (Billboard)	4

=== Year-end charts ===
Chart (2000)	Position
US Top R&B/Hip-Hop Albums (Billboard)	71

== Certifications ==
Region	Certification	Certified units/sales
United Kingdom (BPI)	Silver	60,000^{*}
United States (RIAA)	Gold	500,000^{^}
^{*} Sales figures based on certification alone.^{^} Shipments figures based on certification alone.
