= Any Given Sunday (soundtrack) =

Soundtrack album by various artists
- Released: January 4, 2000
- Recorded: 1999
- Label: Atlantic
- Producers: Bink, Black Mob Group, George Spivey, Dr. Chung, Melissa Elliott, Hole, Bob Ritchie, Howard Benson, Kasseem Dean, Pharrell Williams & Chad Hugo, Tony McAnany

Professional ratings
Review scores
Source	Rating
AllMusic	2.5/5 stars
Kerrang!	2/5 stars

Any Given Sunday is the soundtrack to the 1999 film. It was released on January 4, 2000, through Atlantic Records and consisted of a blend of hip-hop, heavy metal, alternative rock, and R&B. The album found success on the Billboard charts, making it to No. 28 on the Billboard 200 and No. 11 on the Top R&B/Hip-Hop Albums, and featured the single "Shut 'Em Down", which peaked at No. 31 on the Hot Rap Singles.

Any Given Sunday, Vol. 2 picks up where the original soundtrack left off. Once again, actor Jamie Foxx closes the album out with the theme song, but cuts from Richard Hall, Zapp & Roger, and Ozomatli are also featured. Ex-Band guitarist Robbie Robertson leads with five tracks, including "Bended Knee", "Ghost Dance", "Amazing Grace", and "Out of the Blue".

== Track listing (soundtrack) ==
No.	Title	Writer(s)	Producer(s)	Length
1.	"Who You Gonna Call" (Missy "Misdemeanor" Elliott)	M. Elliott, R. Harrell, T. McAnany	Bink, Missy Elliott, Tony McAnany	4:08
2.	"Reunion" (Capone-N-Noreaga)	K. Holley, L. Porter, L. Mason, M. Thomas, M. Slamer, V. Santiago	Ez Elpee	4:41
3.	"Never Goin' Back" (Mobb Deep)	A. Johnson, K. Muchita	Havoc	3:37
4.	"Sole Sunday" (Goodie Mob featuring OutKast)	A. Benjamin, C. Gipp, D. Sheats, W. Knighton	Mr. DJ	3:59
5.	"Shut 'Em Down" (LL Cool J)	G. Spivey, J.T. Smith	DJ Scratch, LL Cool J (co.)	3:20
6.	"Shut Up" (Trick Daddy, Trina, Deuce Poppi & Co)	C. Evans, L. Smith, K. Taylor, M. Young, T. Teller	The Black Mob Group	4:22
7.	"Any Given Sunday" (Jamie Foxx featuring Guru and Common)	J. Foxx, K. Elam, R.L. Lynn	Jamie Foxx	3:59
8.	"Whatever It Takes" (P.O.D.)	S. Sandoval, W. Bernardo, T. Daniels, M. Curiel, T. McAnany	Howard Benson	4:03
9.	"Fuck That" (Kid Rock)	B. Ritchie	Kid Rock	3:41
10.	"Be a Man" (Hole)	W. Corgan, C. Love, E. Erlandson	Hole, Michael Beinhorn	3:18
11.	"My Niggas" (DMX)	E. Simmons, K. Dean	Swizz Beatz	1:05
12.	"Jump" (Mystikal)	C. Hugo, M. Tyler, P. Williams	The Neptunes	4:07
13.	"Move Right Now" (Swizz Beatz featuring Drag-On and Eve)	E. Jeffers, K. Dean, M. Smalls	Swizz Beatz	3:46
14.	"Why" (Godsmack)	S. Erna	Sully Erna	3:15
15.	"Stompbox" (Overseer)	Dr. Chung	Dr. Chung	4:08
16.	"Any Given Sunday" (Outro) (Jamie Foxx)	J. Foxx	Jamie Foxx	2:31

== Track listing (Vol. 2) ==
No.	Title	Writer(s)	Length
1.	"Amazing Grace" (Robbie Robertson)	John Newton	1:37
2.	"Out of the Blue" (Robbie Robertson)	Robbie Robertson	2:50
3.	"Peace" (Paul Kelly / Al Pacino / Robbie Robertson)	Paul Kelly	5:04
4.	"Graciosa" (Moby)	Lord Finesse	3:39
5.	"Cruisin'" (Robbie Robertson)	Smokey Robinson / Marvin Tarplin	4:19
6.	"Carry Me" (Robbie Robertson)	Tim Gordine / Robbie Robertson	4:46
7.	"Ghost Dance" (Robbie Robertson)	Robbie Robertson / J. Wilson	4:47
8.	"Don't Explain" (Nina Simone)	Billie Holiday, Arthur Herzog Jr.	4:17
9.	"Como Ves" (Ozomatli)	Jesus Perez	3:58
10.	"Cheek to Cheek" (Ella Fitzgerald)	Irving Berlin	3:46
11.	"My Name is Willie" (Jamie Foxx)	Robbie Robertson	1:52
12.	"So Ruff, So Tuff" (Roger)	Roger / Larry Troutman	4:49
13.	"Without a Daddy (Black Girl/White Girl)" (2Shé)		4:05
14.	"Fierce #2" (Richard Horowitz)		2:22
15.	"Drive" (Paul Kelly)	Paul Kelly	3:55
16.	"Any Given Sunday Outro" (Jamie Foxx)	J. Foxx	2:31

== Other songs featured in the film, but not on the soundtrack ==
1. Albo Gator - 4AD
2. Bawitdaba - Kid Rock
3. Bless Me Father - P.O.D.
4. Blue On Blue - Robbie Robertson
5. Boy - Trick Daddy Featuring Lost Tribe & JV
6. Everloving - Moby
7. Find My Baby - Moby
8. Fleeting Smile - Roger Eno
9. I Can't Face The Music - Billie Holiday
10. I Didn't Know About It - Thelonious Monk
11. Life Form - Hawkwind
12. More Bounce To The Ounce - Zapp
13. Motorbreath - Metallica
14. Paranoid - Black Sabbath
15. Rattlebone - Robbie Robertson
16. Revolution - Kirk Franklin
17. Right Here, Right Now - Fatboy Slim
18. Rock And Roll Part 2 - Gary Glitter
19. Spiritual - Bill Brown
20. Supermoves - Overseer
21. Take California - Propellerheads
22. That's The Way (I Like It) - KC & The Sunshine Band
23. The Wrestler - Slick Sixty
24. Twilight Zone - 2 Unlimited
25. Ultramarine - Michael Brook
26. Viscaya Fight - Danny Saber
27. We Will Rock You - Queen
28. When Your Lover Has Gone - Ben Webster Featuring Oscar Peterson
29. Use Me - Bill Withers
30. My Weakness - Moby
