= Put Your Hands Up (LL Cool J song) =

Single by LL Cool J

from the album Violator: The Album, V2.0
- B-side: "Put Your Hands Up"
- Released: May 13, 2001
- Genre: Hip hop
- Length: 3:56
- Label: Violator
- Songwriters: James Todd Smith; Kasseem Dean
- Producer: Swizz Beatz

LL Cool J singles chronology
"'You and Me'" (2000)	"Put Your Hands Up" (2001)	"Fatty Girl" (2001)

"Put Your Hands Up" is a single by LL Cool J from the hip-hop compilation album, Violator: The Album, V2.0. It was released in 2001 for Violator Records and was written and produced from LL and Swizz Beatz. Put Your Hands Up spent 1 week on the Hot Rap Singles chart, peaking at #50.

== Track listing ==
=== A-Side ===
1. "Put Your Hands Up" (Clean Version)- 3:45

=== B-Side ===
1. "Put Your Hands Up" (Dirty Version)- 3:45
2. "Put Your Hands Up" (Instrumental)- 3:45
