= JoJo Pellegrino =

American rapper

- Born: Joseph Edwards; Staten Island, New York, U.S.
- Genre: Hip hop
- Years active: 1998–present

Joseph Edwards, professionally known as Jojo Pellegrino, is an American rapper and songwriter from Staten Island, New York. Pellegrino was formally managed by Chris Lighty as a member of the Violator imprint. Pellegrino made his name in the New York hip hop scene with his debut singles "Fogedaboudid" and "Where I'm From", with "Fogedaboudid" becoming popular on local radio stations.

== Career ==
Pellegrino began his professional career in the music business in 1998 on the mix tape circuit with DJ's such as DJ Clue, DJ Kay Slay, DJ Skribble and many more. He was soon noticed and recruited by Chris Lighty into the Violator management team where he appeared on the Violator V2.0 compilation album (the second and final installment in the Violator Hip Hop compilations) in 2001. He continued to make regular appearances on various mixtapes and compilations, eventually dropping the “Hitman for Hire” mixtape hosted by Hot 97's DJ Kay Slay which received some praise in XXL magazine and was given MTV mixtape of the month on MTV News. In 2021 he released the full length LP entitled “Hitman for hire V2” featuring Ghostface Killah and Raekwon as well as Conway The Machine. JoJo Pellegrino has appeared on the soundtrack of Grand Theft Auto III.
