= Notorious (2009 film) =

2009 film by George Tillman Jr

- Theatrical release poster
- Directed by: George Tillman Jr.
- Written by: Reggie Rock Bythewood; Cheo Hodari Coker
- Produced by: Voletta Wallace; Wayne Barrow; Mark Pitts; Robert Tietel; Trish Hofmann
- Starring: Angela Bassett; Derek Luke; Jamal Woolard; Anthony Mackie
- Cinematography: Michael Grady
- Edited by: Dirk Westervelt; Steven Rosenblum
- Music by: Danny Elfman
- Production companies: Fox Searchlight Pictures; Voletta Wallace Films; By Storm Films; State Street Pictures; Bad Boy Films
- Distributed by: Fox Searchlight Pictures
- Release date: January 16, 2009
- Running time: 123 minutes
- Country: United States
- Language: English
- Budget: $20 million
- Box office: $44.4 million

Notorious is a 2009 American biographical drama film based on the life of Brooklyn-based hip-hop artist Christopher "Biggie Smalls" Wallace/the Notorious B.I.G.. The film was directed by George Tillman Jr. and written by Reggie Rock Bythewood and Cheo Hodari Coker. Jamal Woolard stars as Wallace, with Angela Bassett, Derek Luke, and Anthony Mackie in supporting roles.

The film dramatizes key events in Biggie's life: his criminal lifestyle, arrest and release from prison, his relationships with Sean Combs (who serves as executive producer), Tupac Shakur, Lil' Kim, and Faith Evans, his involvement in the East Coast–West Coast hip hop rivalry, and his drive-by-shooting murder on March 9, 1997. Biggie's mother, Voletta, served as a producer for the film, alongside his former managers Wayne Barrow and Mark Pitts.

Notorious was released in the United States on January 16, 2009, by Fox Searchlight Pictures. The film received mixed reviews from critics, with praise mainly aimed at Woolard's performance and grossed $44.4 million on a $20 million budget.

== Plot ==
In 1997, Biggie Smalls is shot and killed by a drive-by assailant.

In the 1980s in Brooklyn, young Biggie sells crack with his friends D-Roc and Lil Cease. By 1990, Biggie's girlfriend Jan is pregnant, so he needs to make more money. Biggie wins a rap battle but his mother, Voletta Wallace, throws him out of the house for dealing drugs.

Biggie gets caught in possession of weapons and cocaine and serves nine months in prison. Shortly after, Biggie meets a young Kim Jones and they have sex, but Kim refuses to pursue a relationship. After reconciling with his mother, Biggie records a demo called "Microphone Murderer" which catches the attention of Puffy, an ambitious producer for Uptown Records. Puffy promises Biggie a record deal but Biggie finds out that Puffy is no longer employed by Uptown Records. Biggie and his friend D-Roc are caught again with drugs; D-Roc takes the fall for the both of them to allow Biggie to pursue a rap career.

Biggie becomes depressed when he finds out Voletta has breast cancer but cheers up when Puffy signs him to Bad Boy Records. Biggie records his first album, Ready to Die. He meets and marries singer Faith Evans. However, Faith catches Biggie cheating on her. Tensions between him, Faith, Jan, and Lil' Kim continue to grow.

Sometime later, Biggie begins a friendship with rapper and actor Tupac Shakur and celebrates his debut album Ready To Die. In November 1994, Tupac is shot in Quad Studios, however, he blames Puffy, Biggie, and Bad Boy Records for setting him up. At the 1995 Source Awards, Death Row Records executive Suge Knight makes a speech "dissing" Puffy and Bad Boy Records, claiming Death Row is the better label. Soon the disagreement escalates into the East Coast–West Coast hip-hop rivalry, and attacks are made on both sides. At the 1996 Soul Train Awards in Los Angeles, Biggie receives a death threat by phone. At the afterparty, Tupac and Suge verbally assault Biggie, but leave when Biggie's security threatens them with a pistol. A track called "Who Shot Ya?" is later released, which is interpreted as a diss directed at Tupac. Biggie and Puffy claim that "Who Shot Ya?" was recorded before Tupac was shot, but Tupac responds with "Hit 'Em Up" which disses Biggie and claims a sexual relationship with Faith Evans. After seeing a magazine photo of Tupac and Faith hugging each other, Biggie confronts Faith but she insists nothing happened.

The two attempt to reconcile after she tells him she's pregnant with his child, but the hip-hop rivalry continues to escalate. Biggie goes on tour in Los Angeles but the crowd boos him, throwing up West Coast signs to show they are siding with Tupac. Annoyed, Biggie performs "Who Shot Ya?", which enrages the crowd even more. The rivalry between the two rappers continues until September 1996, when Tupac is murdered in Las Vegas. Voletta tells Biggie that Tupac was probably killed as a result of their rivalry, which shakes him up. Biggie attempts to ease the tensions in his life by visiting Jan and their daughter more often.

Biggie and D-Roc renew their friendship after D-Roc is released from prison and Biggie confides that he wants out of the rap game. However, Biggie travels to Los Angeles to promote his upcoming album Life After Death, bringing D-Roc and Lil' Cease with him along with Puffy and Faith. There, he receives several death threats. He calls Lil' Kim to apologize, but Biggie is shot and killed in his car. His funeral is held a few days later and his friends and colleagues grieve at their loss. Hundreds of fans are lined up to pay their respects. The crowd dances to his hit song "Hypnotize".

== Cast ==
- Jamal Woolard as Christopher "Biggie Smalls" Wallace/the Notorious B.I.G.
  - Christopher Jordan Wallace as young Christopher Wallace
- Angela Bassett as Voletta Wallace
- Derek Luke as Sean "Puff Daddy" Combs
- Anthony Mackie as Tupac Shakur
- Antonique Smith as Faith Evans
- Marc John Jefferies as Lil' Cease
- Naturi Naughton as Kimberly "Lil' Kim" Jones
- Kevin Phillips as Mark Pitts
- Julia Pace Mitchell as Jan Jackson
- Dennis L.A. White as Damion "D-Roc" Butler
- Edwin Freeman as Mister Cee
- Valence Thomas as DJ 50 Grand
- Sean Ringgold as Suge Knight
- Anwan Glover as Snoop Dogg
- Charles Malik Whitfield as Wayne Barrow
- Aunjanue Ellis as Sandy

== Production ==
=== Development ===
Antoine Fuqua was originally set to direct before director George Tillman Jr. signed on to direct the project. The film was distributed by Fox Searchlight Pictures. Producers on Notorious include Sean Combs (credited as an executive producer), Voletta Wallace, and Biggie's former managers Wayne Barrow and Mark Pitts.

=== Casting ===
In early October 2007, open casting calls for the role of The Notorious B.I.G. began. Actors, rappers and members of the public all participated. Rapper Beanie Sigel auditioned for the role but was not picked. Nissim Black (then known as D. Black) was also under consideration. Eventually it was announced that Jamal Woolard was cast as Biggie (he would also play Biggie in the Tupac biopic All Eyez on Me).

Other cast members include Angela Bassett as Voletta Wallace, Derek Luke as Sean Combs, Antonique Smith as Faith Evans, Naturi Naughton (formerly of 3LW) as Lil' Kim, Dennis L.A. White as D-Roc and Anthony Mackie as Tupac Shakur. The members of the hip-hop group True 2 Life Music held small roles. An unknown actor also portrays Craig Mack in a scene as well.

=== Filming ===
Principal photography began in March 2008.

== Soundtrack ==
A soundtrack album was released to accompany the film, although only eight of its tracks feature in the movie. The following tracks which Christopher Wallace Jr. had input on feature in the movie:

- "Born Again" (Intro)
- "Hypnotize"
- "Going Back to Cali"
- "Ten Crack Commandments"
- "Bed Stuy Brooklyn" (the film credits list this as the title, although the track appears on the soundtrack under the name "Guaranteed Raw")
- "Suicidal Thoughts"
- "Everyday Struggle"
- "It's a Demo" (the film credits list this as the title, although the track appears on the soundtrack under the name "Microphone Murderer")
- "Pimps & Macs"
- "Party and Bullshit"
- "Machine Gun Funk"
- "Unbelievable"
- "Juicy"
- "Flava in Ya Ear"
- "Big Poppa"
- "Warning"
- "I Love the Dough"
- "Get Money"
- "Gimme the Loot"
- "Who Shot Ya?"
- "Sky's the Limit"

== Reception ==
=== Box office ===
Notorious opened on January 16, 2009, in 1,638 venues. The film earned $20,497,596 in its first weekend, ranking fourth in the domestic box office behind newcomer Paul Blart: Mall Cop, holdover Gran Torino, and other newcomer My Bloody Valentine 3D. The film closed on April 2, having grossed $36,843,682 in the domestic box office (US/Canada) and $7,528,069 internationally for a worldwide total of $44,371,751.

=== Critical reaction ===
On Rotten Tomatoes, the film has an approval rating of 52% based on 145 reviews, with an average rating of 5.57/10. The site's critical consensus reads, "A biopic that lacks the luster of its subject, Notorious is generic rise-and-fall fare that still functions as a primer for those less familiar with the work and life of the hip hop icon." At Metacritic the film has a score of 60 out of 100, based on 32 critics, indicating "mixed or average reviews".

Roger Ebert gave the film three and a half out of four stars, applauding the film focusing on Christopher Wallace and not his rapping persona.

=== Criticism by Lil' Kim ===
Lil' Kim was unhappy about the promiscuous manner in which she's portrayed in the film, saying, "Regardless of the many lies in the movie and false portrayal of me to help carry a storyline through, I will still continue to carry his legacy through my hard work and music." She wasn't happy with Naturi Naughton's portrayal of her. She felt the producers were more interested in her "character" than her. Lil' Kim's scenes in the film contained a significant amount of nudity and sexuality. The film's producers, including Voletta Wallace, downplayed her comments.

== Home media ==
Notorious was released on Blu-Ray and DVD on April 21, 2009. In the first three weeks, about 858,000 DVD units had been sold, bringing in $19.5 million in revenue.

== See also ==
- All Eyez on Me
- Straight Outta Compton
- 8 Mile
- Get Rich or Die Tryin'
- List of hood films
