= G.O.A.T. (LL Cool J album) =

G.O.A.T. featuring James T. Smith: The Greatest of All Time

Studio album by LL Cool J
- Released: September 12, 2000
- Genre: Hip hop
- Length: 73:43
- Label: Def Jam
- Producers: James "Bimmy" Antney (also exec.); Ill Am; Adam F; Havoc; Vada Nobles; DJ Scratch; Rockwilder; Ty Fyffe; Trackmasters; Marc Wiggins

LL Cool J chronology
Phenomenon (1997)	G.O.A.T. (2000)	10 (2002)

Singles from G.O.A.T.
- 1. "Imagine That" Released: June 27, 2000; 2. "You and Me" Released: October 17, 2000

G.O.A.T. featuring James T. Smith: The Greatest of All Time (simply known as G.O.A.T.) is the eighth studio album by American rapper LL Cool J. It was released on September 12, 2000, under Def Jam Recordings.

== Background ==
The bulk of the album came about in 1999, when DJ Scratch handed LL a CD of six instrumentals. The submission of beats took place when Scratch first met LL in the studio, as both men were working on the song "Ill Bomb," for Funkmaster Flex and DJ Big Kap's album, The Tunnel (1999).

In a 2023 interview with Adam Graham of The Detroit News, who credited LL with creating the acronym G.O.A.T., LL said he got the term from Earl "The Goat" Manigault and Muhammad Ali. Ali's business entity was called G.O.A.T., Inc., based at his home in Berrien Springs, Michigan.

== Critical reception ==
Professional ratings
Aggregate scores
Source	Rating
Metacritic	73/100
Review scores
Source	Rating
AllMusic	2.5/5 stars
Entertainment Weekly	B+
NME	7/10
RapReviews	7/10
Rolling Stone	4/5 stars
Spin	5/10
The Source	4/5 stars
USA Today	3/4 stars

G.O.A.T. received generally positive reviews. At Metacritic, which assigns a normalized rating out of 100 to reviews from mainstream publications, the album received an average score of 73, based on 12 reviews. Entertainment Weekly's Tom Sinclair noted that the album "finds the Queens-bred rapper in near top form. Talking trash, passing the mic to guests like DMX and Snoop Dogg, reeling off endlessly inventive boasts — he makes it all seem as easy as chillin’ on the boulevard on a hot summer night. The only downer is the creeping note of defensiveness, as though the old goat (who's all of 32) felt compelled to convince a new generation he's still relevant."

Nathan Rabin from The A.V. Club found that "G.O.A.T. suffers from an unsure tone and a lack of thematic cohesion. Although a solid album by a gifted performer, it feels like the work of a rapper chasing trends instead of following his own path. That lack of vision makes the boast inherent in the title seem more hopelessly far-fetched than ever." In her mixed review for AllMusic, editor Diana Potts wrote that G.O.A.T "disappoints. [...] The theme of L.L. as the older seducer who is better than the current man of a girlish temptress has been common through L.L.'s albums. It's like listening to the confessions of a horny 14-year-old teenage boy in the girl's locker room. Even with the help of popular rap acts like DMX and Redman, L.L. Cool J has made the same album he did once before, with no new twists."

== Chart performance ==
G.O.A.T. debuted at number one on the US Billboard 200 with 200,000 in sales, becoming his sole album in his career to do so. It also ousted rapper Nelly's debut album, Country Grammar from the chart's number one position. G.O.A.T. reached number one on the Top R&B/Hip-Hop Albums chart. By 2004, the album had sold 818,000 copies in the United States.

== Track listing ==
G.O.A.T. track listing
No.	Title	Writer(s)	Producer(s)	Length
1.	"Intro"	James Todd Smith; James "Bimmy" Antney	James "Bimmy" Antney	1:52
2.	"Imagine That" (featuring LeShaun)	J.T. Smith; Dana Stinson	Rockwilder	4:59
3.	"Back Where I Belong" (featuring Ja Rule)	J.T. Smith; Vada Nobles	Vada Nobles; Marc Wiggins	4:07
4.	"LL Cool J" (featuring Kandice Love)	J.T. Smith; George Spivey; Jay Hawkins	DJ Scratch	4:24
5.	"Take It Off"	J.T. Smith; Adam Fenton	Adam F	3:34
6.	"Skit"			0:45
7.	"Fuhgidabowdit" (featuring DMX and Method Man & Redman)	J.T. Smith; Jean-Claude Olivier; Samuel Barnes; Earl Simmons; Clifford Smith; Reggie Noble	Trackmasters	4:33
8.	"Farmers" (featuring Tikki Diamondz)	J.T. Smith; Edward Hinson; Norman Whitfield; Barrett Strong	Self	3:39
9.	"This Is Us" (featuring Carl Thomas)	J.T. Smith; Nobles; Carl Thomas	Vada Nobles	5:55
10.	"Can't Think"	J.T. Smith; Tyrone Fyffe	Ty Fyffe	4:52
11.	"Hello" (featuring Amil)	J.T. Smith; Spivey; Denzil Miller; Bernard Edwards	DJ Scratch	3:52
12.	"You and Me" (featuring Kelly Price)	J.T. Smith; Spivey; Giuliano Salerni; Phil Hurtt	DJ Scratch	5:31
13.	"Homicide"	J.T. Smith; Spivey; Carlos Guedes	DJ Scratch	5:01
14.	"U Can't Fuck with Me" (featuring Snoop Dogg, Xzibit and Jayo Felony)	J.T. Smith; Spivey	DJ Scratch	4:26
15.	"Queens Is" (featuring Prodigy)	J.T. Smith; Kejuan Muchita; Albert Johnson	Havoc	4:25
16.	"The G.O.A.T."	J.T. Smith; Fenton	Adam F.	4:09

Bonus tracks
No.	Title	Writer(s)	Producer(s)	Length
17.	"Ill Bomb" (Funkmaster Flex & Big Kap featuring LL Cool J)	J.T. Smith; Spivey; Elias Wrubel	DJ Scratch	4:02
18.	"M.I.S.S. I" (featuring Case)	J.T. Smith; Tonee McClinton; Karlyton Clanton	Ill Am	3:18
19.	"Shut 'Em Down"	J.T. Smith; Spivey	DJ Scratch	3:23
Total length:				73:43

Sample credits

- "LL Cool J" contains a sample from "I Put a Spell on You" (1956) as performed by Screaming Jay Hawkins.
- "Farmers" contains a sample from "Ungena Za Ulimwengu (Unite the World)" (1971) as performed by the Temptations.
- "Hello" contains elements of "Telephone" (1984) as performed by Diana Ross.
- "You and Me" contains an interpolation of "You'll Never Know" (1981) as performed by Hi-Gloss.
- "Homicide" contains a sample from of "Harposaurus" (1992) as performed by Carlos Guedes
- "Ill Bomb" contains a sample from "I'm Afraid the Masquerade Is Over" (1971) as performed by David Porter.

== Charts ==
=== Weekly charts ===
Weekly chart performance for G.O.A.T.
Chart (2000)	Peak position
Australian Albums (ARIA)	65
Canadian Albums (Billboard)	5
Dutch Albums (Album Top 100)	35
French Albums (SNEP)	56
German Albums (Offizielle Top 100)	17
Scottish Albums (Official Charts)	49
Swiss Albums (Schweizer Hitparade)	13
UK Albums (Official Charts)	29
UK R&B Albums (Official Charts)	4
US Billboard 200	1
US Top R&B/Hip-Hop Albums (Billboard)	1

=== Year-end charts ===
Year-end chart performance for G.O.A.T.
Chart (2000)	Position
US Billboard 200	139
US Top R&B/Hip-Hop Albums (Billboard)	50

== Certifications ==
Certifications for G.O.A.T.
Region	Certification	Certified units/sales
Canada (Music Canada)	Gold	50,000^{^}
United States (RIAA)	Gold	500,000^{^}
^{^} Shipments figures based on certification alone.
