= Breathe and Stop =

Single by Q-Tip

from the album Amplified
- Released: January 25, 2000
- Recorded: 1999
- Genre: Hip hop
- Length: 4:03
- Label: Arista
- Songwriters: Fareed; Yancey; Bell; Brown; Handy; Mickens; Redd; Smith; Thomas; Westfield
- Producer: Jay Dee

Q-Tip singles chronology
"Hot Boyz" (1999)	"Breathe and Stop" (2000)	"Galvanize" (2005)

"Breathe and Stop" is the second single released by Q-Tip from his debut album Amplified, produced by Jay Dee. The video to this single featured Q-Tip in unusual attire dancing with girls.

The song charted at number 71 on the Billboard Hot 100.

The looping instrumental has been used as background music for some segments of Billy Bush's nationally syndicated radio show.

== Charts ==
=== Weekly charts ===
Chart (2000)	Peak position
Ireland (IRMA)	18
Netherlands (Dutch Top 40 Tipparade)	20
Netherlands (Single Top 100)	76
Scotland (OCC)	26
UK Singles (OCC)	12
UK Dance (OCC)	1
UK Hip Hop/R&B (OCC)	3
US Billboard Hot 100	71
US Hot R&B/Hip-Hop Songs (Billboard)	21

=== Year-end charts ===
Chart (2000)	Position
UK Urban (Music Week)	29
US Hot R&B/Hip-Hop Songs (Billboard)	92
