= Break Ya Neck =

2001 single by Busta Rhymes

Single by Busta Rhymes

from the album Genesis
- A-side: "As I Come Back; "Betta Stay Up In Your House
- Released: August 25, 2001
- Recorded: 2000
- Studio: Record One, Los Angeles.
- Genre: Hip hop; contemporary R&B
- Length: 3:51
- Label: Flipmode; J
- Songwriters: Trevor Smith; Andre Young; Mike Elizondo; Scott Storch; Michael Balzary; John Frusciante; Anthony Kiedis; Chad Smith
- Producers: Dr. Dre; Scott Storch

Busta Rhymes singles chronology
"What It Is" (2001)	"Break Ya Neck" (2001)	"As I Come Back" (2001)

Music video
- "Break Ya Neck" on YouTube

"Break Ya Neck" is a song by American rapper Busta Rhymes. It was released as the second single from his fifth studio album Genesis on August 25, 2001, by Flipmode Entertainment and J Records. The song was produced by Scott Storch and Dr. Dre, while singer Truth Hurts provides additional vocals. The song contains an interpolation of the Red Hot Chili Peppers song "Give It Away". The official remix of the single features Twista and Do or Die.

== Music video ==
The music video for this song was directed by Hype Williams and it was released on October 16, 2001. It features cameos from other artists such as Spliff Star, Rah Digga, Rampage, Sean "P. Diddy" Combs, Ludacris, Daymond John, Keith C. Perrin, Dr. Dre, Lil Jon, Swizz Beatz, and CeeLo Green, Big Gipp and Khujo of the Goodie Mob.

== Charts ==
=== Weekly charts ===
Chart (2002)	Peak position
Australia (ARIA)	13
Australian Urban (ARIA)	5
Austria (Ö3 Austria Top 40)	50
France (SNEP)	50
Germany (GfK)	17
Netherlands (Dutch Top 40)	21
Netherlands (Single Top 100)	13
Scotland Singles (Official Charts)	17
Switzerland (Schweizer Hitparade)	20
UK Singles (Official Charts)	11
UK Hip Hop/R&B (Official Charts)	2
US Billboard Hot 100	26
US Hot R&B/Hip-Hop Songs (Billboard)	10

=== Year-end charts ===
Chart (2002)	Position
Australia (ARIA)	100
Netherlands (Single Top 100)	98
UK Singles (Official Charts Company)	185
UK Urban (Music Week)	36
US Hot R&B/Hip-Hop Songs (Billboard)	62

== Certifications ==
Region	Certification	Certified units/sales
Australia (ARIA)	Gold	35,000^{^}
Germany (BVMI)	Gold	250,000^{‡}
New Zealand (RMNZ)	Platinum	30,000^{‡}
United Kingdom (BPI)	Silver	200,000^{‡}
^{^} Shipments figures based on certification alone.^{‡} Sales+streaming figures based on certification alone.
