= Full Clip =

- Film poster
- Directed by: mink
- Written by: Kantz
- Produced by: Happy Walters; Preston Holmes; Joanna Shaw; Jason Barhydt
- Starring: Busta Rhymes; Xzibit; Tiny Lister; Shaun Baker; Bubba Smith; Mark Boone Junior
- Narrated by: Wyclef Jean
- Cinematography: M. Dietrick Schumacher
- Edited by: Don Pollard
- Music by: Don MacBain
- Distributed by: Lions Gate Films
- Release date: August 9, 2004
- Running time: 95 minutes
- Countries: United States; France
- Language: English

Full Clip is a 2004 action film starring Busta Rhymes, Xzibit, Bubba Smith, Tiny Lister and Mark Boone Junior. It is directed by mink and written by Kantz. Full Clip is a 1970s-style blaxploitation action movie that is a at liberty remake of the 1975 film Bucktown.

== Plot ==
Joshua Pope (Busta Rhymes) returns to his home in a small town to claim the inheritance his father has left him. Once there, however, he finds that the local police have corrupted the town and are ruling with an iron fist. So, with the help of an old friend (Xzibit) and his cohorts, Pope sets out to reclaim the town he once loved.

== Cast ==
- Busta Rhymes as Joshua Pope
- Xzibit as Duncan
- Shaun Baker as McCloud
- Bubba Smith as "Sleepy"
- Julio Lugo as Milkman
- Shakara Ledard as Simone
- Mark Boone Junior as Sheriff Wallace
- Prodigy as Gideon
- Tiny Lister Jr. as Bumaye
- Bobb'e J. Thompson as Stokley
- Nichole Hiltz as Shelly
- Ellen Cleghorne as Ma Dukes
- DeRay Davis as Preacher
- Danielle Vasinova as Samy
- Wyclef Jean as the Narrator
