= Mark Pitts =

American record executive and talent manager (born 1970)

- Also known as: Mark "Gucc" Pitts
- Born: Mark Pitts; July 4, 1970 (age 56); Brooklyn, New York City, U.S.
- Genres: R&B; hip-hop; soul; pop
- Occupation: Record executive
- Years active: 1993–present
- Labels: RCA; ByStorm; Bad Boy; Arista

Mark Pitts (born July 4, 1970) is an American record executive and talent manager who has served as President of RCA Records since 2021. He also co-founded the record label ByStorm Entertainment with Wayne Barrow in 1998, through which he has signed artists including J. Cole, Miguel, Ro James, Andrea Martin, B. Smyth, Mali Music and Luke Christopher, among others.

He began his career as a staffer for Puff Daddy's Bad Boy Records, where he co-managed the Notorious B.I.G and Faith Evans; he executive produced the former's first two albums: Ready to Die (1994) and Life After Death (1997). Pitts executive produced the Netflix film, Biggie: I Got a Story to Tell (2021), and co-produced Notorious and Blue (both 2009).

Pitts has worked with artists who have amassed a total of 53 Grammy Awards nominations, and 10 wins.

== Early life and career ==
Pitts was born in Brooklyn, New York, on July 4, 1970. He was first introduced to music by his grandmother, a classically trained piano teacher who began giving Pitts lessons at the age of four. Pitts spent six years of his childhood at the Pratt Institute in Brooklyn, and later continued learning music at the High School of Music and Performing Arts, where he also studied art.

His professional music career started in the early 1990s, prior to entering Howard University, when he formed a rap group called Three Left. He intended to pitch the rap group to his friend, Sean Combs, who was working at Uptown Records at the time. After a meeting with Combs, Pitts decided that he wanted to work behind the scenes. In 1993, he started working with Combs at his entertainment company Bad Boy Entertainment, where Pitts managed the Notorious B.I.G., Faith Evans, and Changing Faces. Pitts would also arrange for his cousin and business partner Wayne Barrow to meet with B.I.G. as well. Barrow would join Pitts in managing B.I.G.

Pitts opened Mark Pitts Management (now ByStorm), took on additional artists such as Nas, and a few years later negotiated an end to the public feud between Nas and Jay-Z. He told Essence magazine:

"I have to say it's one of my most proudest moments. It felt good and I always believe that having the two of them sit down and (reconcile) was something that BIG would have wanted me to do and in some way I felt like if BIG ever had the chance that's what he would have done with Tupac. At the time, when me and Nas first started working together, I said, 'We have to do something different. You're supposed to be a movement, so you need to do a song with Jay and get past all the bulls—. So I had a conversation with Jay and he was open. I couldn't believe it was going down, and because they both felt comfortable and know my energy, and when we all got together that day, I couldn't believe it was happening and we sat down and worked things out like men. That was definitely BIG guiding me."

In 1995, Pitts moved over to an executive position at Universal Records (née Rising Tide) where he signed Philly-based rapper Tracey Lee, and five years later became Senior Vice President of A&R for Arista Records, where he worked with Usher on several albums including his album Confessions that was certified diamond (for sales of 10 million), as well as TLC, Anthony Hamilton, and CeeLo Green. He signed Chris Brown and Miguel while at Jive Records. In 2006, Pitts was made a father for the second time, after the birth of his daughter, Jaden.

In 2008, Pitts was diagnosed with Bell's Palsy, which paralyzed the left side of his face. Through therapy and an adapted physical health regime, he recovered his facial mobility and full health after six months.

== 2011–2019 ==
In 2011, Pitts was named President of Urban Music at RCA Records. In his joint venture between his ByStorm Entertainment and RCA, his roster includes Kardinal Offishall, J. Cole, Jawan Harris, Miguel, Ro James & Angel. Ro James' gold-certified single "Permission" was nominated for his first-ever Grammy Award in the "Best R&B Performance" category from his debut album Eldorado, and the single held #1 spot on the Billboard Urban Adult Contemporary Songs chart for ten consecutive weeks.

As president of Urban Music at RCA Records, Pitts executive produced the first four of J.Cole's and all of Miguel's albums.

In 2013, Pitts gained major success with Miguel's Kaleidoscope Dream which grabbed five Grammy Award nominations. He had also shepherded Brown's Fortune, which topped the charts that year.

As president of RCA Records, Urban Music, Pitts continued to oversee everything on Chris Brown, who he originally signed at Jive Records and moved to the RCA roster with the Jive-RCA merger in 2011. Pitts was instrumental in the decision to release 45 songs on the artist's last album, Heartbreak on a Full Moon, which came out November 3, 2017.

Pitts executive produced the second Miguel album, Kaleidoscope Dream, which featured the single, "Adorn". That track remained at No. 1 on the Billboard R&B/Hip-Hop Songs airplay chart for 23 weeks, making history and won the Grammy Award for Best R&B Song in 2013.

Miguel's War & Leisure was called "the album of 2017" by Forbes magazine. In the same article, the artist called Pitts his mentor. The Billboard Top 10 album features the platinum-selling single "Sky Walker"(featuring Travis Scott).

Miguel collaborated on Kygo's single "Remind Me to Forget" on the latter's RCA album, Kids in Love. and the track received over 200,000,000-plus Spotify streams and was nominated for an iHeartRadio Music Award.

Other achievements in Pitts' urban division during the 2017-18 period include platinum-selling artists SZA and Khalid, G-Eazy, among many others, and marked the 20th anniversary of ByStorm Entertainment. The work of SZA, Khalid and GoldLink earned first-time Grammy nominations that year and SZA's Ctrl sold two million copies.

Pitts continued to guide the career of Chris Brown, and was the A&R of the artist's 2019 single, "Go Crazy" with Young Thug, as well as Brown's million-selling hit with Drake, "No Guidance". That track was nominated for a Grammy, and was one of the biggest-selling songs of 2019, breaking the record for the longest No. 1 on Billboard's R&B/Hip-Hop Airplay chart for 27 weeks, an accolade that bested Pitts' and ByStorm's own artist Miguel and his song, "Adorn".

== 2020–present ==
As the decade began, Pitts was instrumental in signing Atlanta rapper Young Nudy to RCA, as well as Brooklyn drill founders Winner's Circle and Grammy-nominated Deante Hitchcock.

In 2020, Usher made history with two No.1 singles on the Billboard Hot AC chart, "Bad Habits" in November preceded by "Don't Waste My Time", featuring Ella Mai the previous June.

In January 2021, Pitts was named President of RCA Records.

In March 2021, Chris Brown reached an historic milestone when his single, "Go Crazy" with Young Thug logged the 24th consecutive week at No. 1 on the R&B/Hip Hop Airplay chart. He now has had two songs with the most weeks at No. 1 in the chart's 28-year history, with "Go Crazy" and "No Guidance".

On April 14, 2026, Pitts parted ways with RCA to form a new management company.

== Recognition and honors ==
Based on worldwide chart data in 2005, he was named "World's No.8 A&R of 2005" by the music industry A&R site HitQuarters for that year after success in breaking new artists Ciara and Chris Brown.

Pitts was featured in Crain's magazine's "40 Under 40" in 2015.

On June 11, 2018, Pitts received a proclamation as an African-American power influencer from New York City Council's Black, Latino and Asian Caucus (BLAC) overseen by the city's mayor Bill de Blasio.

Men's Health magazine ran an editorial spread on Pitts in its January 2019 issue . "My diagnosis of Bell's Palsy changed everything, and after, I began a training regime of five times a week. I'm very proud to be recognized by Men's Health. This achievement is greater than a Grammy Award because my health is more important. I'm blessed to feel good now", he said.

== Selected discography ==
Year	Project	Artist	Record label	Role
1995	"We Got It Goin' On"	Changing Faces	Atlantic	Producer
1997	Life After Death	The Notorious B.I.G.	Bad Boy Entertainment	Executive producer
1997	"Gitty Up"	Salt 'N Pepa	London	Remix Producer
1999	Born Again	The Notorious B.I.G.	Bad Boy Entertainment	Executive producer
2001	Supernova	Lisa Left Eye Lopes	Arista	Co-producer
2004	Confessions	Usher	Arista	Executive producer
2005	Chris Brown	Chris Brown	Jive	Executive producer
2007	Exclusive	Chris Brown	Jive	Executive producer
2008	Here I Stand	Usher	LaFace	Executive producer
2009	Graffiti	Chris Brown	Jive	Executive producer
2010	Raymond v. Raymond	Usher	LaFace	Executive producer
2010	All I Want Is You	Miguel	Jive	Executive producer
2011	F.A.M.E.	Chris Brown	Jive	Executive producer
2011	Cole World: The Sideline Story	J. Cole	RocNation/Columbia	Executive producer
2012	Looking 4 Myself	Usher	RCA	Executive producer
2012	Fortune	Chris Brown	RCA	Executive producer
2012	Kaleidoscope Dream	Miguel	RCA	Executive producer
2013	Born Sinner	J. Cole	Dreamville/RocNation/Columbia	Executive producer
2014	"New Flame"	Chris Brown	RCA	Co-writer
2014	X	Chris Brown	RCA	Executive producer
2014	A.K.A.	Jennifer Lopez	A.K.A.-Capitol	Co-writer
2014	2014 Forest Hills Drive	J. Cole	Dreamville/RocNation/Columbia	Executive producer
2015	Royalty	Chris Brown	RCA	Executive producer
2016	Hard II Love	Usher	RCA	Executive producer
2015	Wildheart	Miguel	RCA	Executive producer
2016	El Dorado	Ro James	Bystorm/RCA	Executive producer
2016	4 Your Eyez Only	J. Cole	Dreamville/RocNation/Columbia	Executive producer
2017	Heartbreak on a Full Moon	Chris Brown	RCA	Executive producer
2017	War & Leisure	Miguel	RCA	Executive Producer
2018	A	Usher	RCA	Executive producer
2019	Indigo	Chris Brown	RCA	Executive producer
