= AMyth =

AMyth was an R&B vocal quartet from Baton Rouge, Louisiana, formed in 1995 while the members were students at Southern University. The originally called themselves "Forté", but changed their name after being inspired by the television show Legacy. They relocated to New York to do demo work, and once there they became acquainted with a lawyer who worked for the law firm representing LL Cool J. They were the first act to appear on LL Cool J's label Rock the Bells Records. In October 1999 their single "1*2*3" appeared on the Billboard Hot 100 chart, peaking at number 59.

== Discography ==
=== Albums ===
- The World Is Ours (Rock the Bells, 1999)

=== Singles ===
- 1*2*3 (1999, Rock the Bells 16948) #59
- My Body (2000)

== Members ==
- Steven Joyce
- Otis "Labo" Jupiter
- Jelani Philipps
- Wayne Spears
