= Wrongdoing =

Act that is illegal or immoral

A wrong, or wrengths (from Old English wrang – 'crooked'), is an act that is illegal, incorrect, or immoral. Legal wrongs are usually quite clearly defined in the law of a state or jurisdiction. They can be divided into civil wrongs and crimes (or criminal offenses) in common law countries, while civil law countries tend to have some additional categories, such as contraventions. Moral wrong is an underlying concept for legal wrong. Some moral wrongs are punishable by law, for example rape or murder. Other moral wrongs have nothing to do with law but are related to unethical behaviours. On the other hand, some legal wrongs, such as many types of parking offences, could hardly be classified as moral wrongs.

== Legal wrong ==
A violation of law is any act, or less commonly a failure to act, that fails to abide by existing law. Violations generally include both crimes and civil wrongs. Some acts, such as fraud, can violate civil and criminal laws. In law, a wrong can be a legal injury, which is any damage resulting from a violation of a legal right. A legal wrong can also imply being contrary to the principles of justice or law. It means that something is contrary to conscience or morality and results in treating others unjustly. If the loss caused by a wrong is minor enough, there is no compensation, which principle is known as de minimis non curat lex, otherwise the damages apply. The law of England recognised the concept of a "wrong" before it recognised the distinction between civil wrongs (governed by civil law) and crimes (defined by criminal law), which distinction was developed during the 13th century.

Civil law violations usually lead to civil penalties like fines, criminal offenses to more severe punishments. The severity of the punishment should reflect the severity of the violation (retributive justice). In realistic situations and for minor violations, altruistic punishment was shown not "to fit the crime". This subdivision is similar to the distinction between misdemeanours, and felonies. Other examples of violations of the law include:

- Infraction, in United States law, minor or petty offenses that do not require jury trial. In common usage, "violations" are treated as synonymous with infractions
- Willful violation, in U.S. law, an act with intentional disregard for a regulation, statute, and policy
- Infringement, various violations of laws or rights, usually used in the context of intellectual property
  - e.g. copyright violation
- Breach of contract
- Probation violation
- against traffic rules
  - Moving violation, any violation of law committed by a driver while the vehicle is in motion
  - Parking violation, parking a motor vehicle in a restricted place or an unauthorized manner

== See also ==
- Business ethics
- Error
- Evil
- Goodness and value theory
- Guilt (law)
- Illegalism
- Justice
- Moral rights
- Natural and legal rights
- Rights
- Right to an effective remedy

== Bibliography ==
- Willis, Hugh. Principles of the Law of Damages. The Keefe-Davidson Co.: St. Paul, 1910.
