= Ro James =

American R&B singer

- Born: Ronnie James Tucker; November 19, 1986 (age 39); Stuttgart, West Germany
- Origin: New York City, U.S.
- Genres: R&B
- Occupation: Singer-songwriter
- Years active: 2011–present
- Labels: ByStorm; RCA
- Website: rojamesxix.com

Ronnie James Tucker (born November 19, 1986) professionally known as Ro James, is an American R&B singer. He is best known for his 2015 single "Permission", which peaked at number 37 on the US Hot R&B/Hip-Hop Songs chart. He signed with Mark Pitts' ByStorm Entertainment, an imprint of RCA Records to release his debut studio album, Eldorado (2016).

== Career ==
Born in Stuttgart, West Germany, James is of Panamanian and African-American descent. Throughout his childhood, James would sing regularly, but never in public. He eventually moved to New York where he was influenced by his aunt Rosie Gaines, a former singer for Prince. His love for the album Purple Rain landed him in a studio at the age of 19. His skills as a songwriter began with the song "Portrait", leading up to a credit on the single "Use Me" by R&B singer Miguel after forming a bond with him on MySpace.

James performed in and around New York with artists such as Luke James and Wynter Gordon. In 2013 he released his first EP, a three-part entitled Coke, Jack and Cadillacs. Each part represented important themes in his life - first love, first drink, first car. The EP featured songs that included "A.D.I.D.A.S." and "Pledge Allegiance". It also featured Asher Roth on the song "Lisa". James signed with ByStorm Entertainment/RCA Records in 2015 and subsequently released "Permission", his first single from a major record label, reaching number 37 on the US Hot R&B/Hip-Hop Songs chart. His debut album, Eldorado was released May 27, 2016. It debuted at number 71 on the US Billboard 200 and at number eight on the US Top R&B/Hip-Hop Albums. It subsequently earned him his first nomination for Best R&B Performance at the 59th Grammy Awards in February 2017.

== Discography ==
=== Albums ===
Title	Details	Peak chart positions		
Title	Details	US	US R&B /HH	US R&B
Eldorado	Released: May 27, 2016; Label: ByStorm Entertainment, RCA Records; Format: CD, digital download	71	8	3
Mantic	Released: May 29, 2020; Label: ByStorm Entertainment, RCA Records; Format: Digital download	—	—	—

=== EPs ===
Title	Details
Coke, Jack, and Cadillacs	Released: 2013; Label: Independent; Format: Digital
Smoke	Released: March 23, 2018; Label: ByStorm Entertainment, RCA; Format: Digital download

=== Singles ===
Title	Year	Peak chart positions			Certifications	Album
Title	Year	US Bub.	US R&B /HH	US R&B	Certifications	Album
"Permission"	2015	17	37	12	RIAA: Platinum	Eldorado
"Plan B" (with Brandy)	2020	—	—	—		Mantic

== Tours ==
=== Headlining tour ===
- XIX Tour (2017)

=== Co-headlining tour ===
- The R&B Tour (with BJ The Chicago Kid) (2018)
