= Imagine That (LL Cool J song) =

2000 single by LL Cool J

Single by LL Cool J featuring LeShaun

from the album G.O.A.T.
- B-side: "LL Cool J"
- Released: June 27, 2000
- Recorded: 1999
- Genre: Hip hop; dirty rap
- Length: 4:56
- Label: Def Jam; Universal
- Songwriter: James Todd Smith
- Producers: Rockwilder; LL Cool J

LL Cool J singles chronology
"Shut 'Em Down" (2000)	"Imagine That" (2000)	"You and Me" (2000)

"Imagine That" is a song by LL Cool J released as the lead single from his eighth album, G.O.A.T. It was released on June 27, 2000 for Def Jam Recordings, produced by Rockwilder and LL Cool J, and featured a guest appearance by female rapper LeShaun.

The single was the most successful of the three total tracks released from the album, peaking at number 98 on the Billboard Hot 100, #16 on the Hot Rap Singles and #46 on the Hot R&B/Hip-Hop Songs. The music video for the single was directed by Hype Williams.

== Track listing ==
=== A-side ===
1. "Imagine That" (Radio Edit) – 4:07
2. "Imagine That" (LP Version) – 4:06
3. "Imagine That" (Instrumental) – 4:07

=== B-side ===
1. "LL Cool J" (Radio Edit) – 4:10
2. "LL Cool J" (LP Version) – 4:10
3. "LL Cool J" (Instrumental) – 4:10
