= What It Is (Busta Rhymes song) =

2001 single by Busta Rhymes featuring Kelis

Single by Busta Rhymes featuring Kelis

from the album Violator: The Album, V2.0 and Genesis
- A-side: "Grimey" by Noreaga
- Released: May 1, 2001
- Recorded: 2000–2001
- Genre: Hip hop; contemporary R&B
- Length: 3:30
- Label: Flipmode; J
- Songwriters: Trevor Smith; Pharrell Williams; Chad Hugo
- Producer: The Neptunes

Busta Rhymes singles chronology
"Fire" (2000)	"What It Is" (2001)	"Break Ya Neck" (2001)

Kelis singles chronology
"Good Stuff" (2000)	"What It Is" (2001)	"Candy" (2001)

"What It Is" is a song by American rapper Busta Rhymes featuring American singer Kelis. It was released as the lead single from both management company Violator's second compilation album Violator: The Album, V2.0 and Rhymes' fifth studio album Genesis on May 1, 2001, by Flipmode Entertainment and J Records.

While Kelis is credited only with additional vocals on the single and Violator: The Album, V2.0 release, she is credited as a feature on Genesis.

There's also a Part II by Flipmode Squad which appears on the Dr. Dolittle 2 Soundtrack.

== Composition ==
"What It Is" was composed in 4/4 time and the key of F♯ major, with a tempo of 101 beats per minute.It has a duration time of three minutes and thirty-nine seconds.

== Music video ==
The music video for the song "What It Is" was directed by Hype Williams and follows the split-video format that was popular in hip-hop during the early 2000s. The first portion of the video features the first two verses of "What It Is," while the second half transitions into the first verse of "Grimey" by N.O.R.E. Spliff Star makes a cameo appearance and model Nicole Ricca also appears in the video as one of its featured video vixens.

== Charts ==
Chart (2001)	Peak position
Germany (GfK)	70
US Billboard Hot 100	63
US Hot R&B/Hip-Hop Songs (Billboard)	20
US Hot Rap Songs (Billboard)	4
US Rhythmic Airplay (Billboard)	35
