= Violator (company) =

Management label

- Type: Private
- Industry: Music; film; entertainment
- Founded: 1996; 30 years ago
- Founder: Chris Lighty; Mona Scott
- Headquarters: 11th floor, 36 West 25th Street, Chelsea, Midtown Manhattan, New York City, New York, U.S.
- Key people: Chris Lighty (Founder & CEO); Mona Scott-Young (Co-Founder); James Cruz
- Products: films; video games; music
- Services: Management; music
- Divisions: Violator Records
- Subsidiaries: Violator Entertainment

Violator is a company, record label, marketing group, and multi-media entertainment conglomerate founded and operated by Chris Lighty and Mona Scott-Young until Lighty's death on August 30, 2012.

== Violator Records ==
By 1990, Chris Lighty launched Violator Records, with distribution from Sony Music's Relativity Records. The first two artists signed to Violator Records were Fat Joe and the Beatnuts. The label also signed rapper Chi-Ali.

In the summer of 1998, Chris Lighty signed rapper Mysonne to Violator Records.

In February 1999, Foxy Brown parted ways with Violator following the release of her second album, Chyna Doll (1999). According to reports cited by Billboard, the split came amid the album’s commercial performance after its debut at number one on the Billboard 200. That July, Mysonne, who at the time was working on his debut album, was arrested and ultimately convicted on three counts of robbery, weapons possession and possession of stolen property. He was sentenced to 7–14 years in prison, which resulted in him being dropped from the label and his album shelved.

In March 2000, Chris Lighty ended his business relationship with Def Jam and moved Violator to Sony’s Loud Records. The move followed reported tensions between Lighty and Def Jam executives, who were allegedly dissatisfied with Violator’s performance as a record label and chose not to renew its distribution deal. While Violator's management firm had been successful, its record label branch struggled to replicate the management's success. Though industry insiders speculated that Lighty was pushed out, he stated the decision was part of his long-term plan to grow and "stay fresh." As part of the new arrangement, Lighty was also named executive vice president at Loud.

In March 2003, following the dissolution of Loud, Jive appointed Chris Lighty as senior vice president, bringing Violator with him. Lighty retained his role as president of Violator and took on A&R responsibilities within Jive/Zomba. His first signing in this role was hip-hop duo Mobb Deep. Lighty also planned to release V3: The Good, the Bad & the Ugly, the third installment of Violator's compilation series. The album was originally scheduled for release in winter 2004; however, following the underperformance of its lead singles, "I C U (Doin' It)" (featuring A Tribe Called Quest and Erykah Badu) and "Keep Doin' It" (featuring Mystikal, Dirtbag and Busta Rhymes), Jive shelved the project.

== Violator Management ==
In 1996, Lighty partnered with manager Scott-Young to launch Violator Management. The company specialized in managing the careers of hip-hop and R&B performers. Included among Violator's past and present clients are Mariah Carey, Busta Rhymes, N.O.R.E., Q-Tip, Missy Elliott, Fantasia, Mýa, Diggy Simmons, Cormega, Mobb Deep, LL Cool J, Nas, JoJo Pellegrino, Fat Joe, Uncle Murda, Frankie Cutlass and Da Franchise . Violator has released two compilation albums of material from its artists: Violator: The Album and Violator: The Album, V2.0. The first album features Q-Tip's first solo hit single, "Vivrant Thing".

In August 1999, under the management of Violator, Mobb Deep released their fourth studio album, Murda Muzik, which was co-executive produced by Chris Lighty, credited as "Baby Chris." The album debuted and peaked at number three on the Billboard 200 chart and was later certified platinum by the RIAA for shipping and selling over one million copies, making it the group’s best-selling album.

Violator Management closed out 2001 with the release of Busta Rhymes's fifth studio album, Genesis. Debuting and peaking in the top 10 on the Billboard 200, Genesis was a critical and commercial success, being certified platinum by the RIAA.

By March 2002, Violator began managing American rapper 50 Cent. At the time, 50 Cent was regaining momentum in the industry through the mixtape circuit following his release from Columbia Records and a near-fatal shooting. A bidding war between J, Jive, and Universal began in efforts to sign him and release his debut album. Lighty and Violator played a key role in managing 50 Cent’s re-emergence, positioning him as a major figure in early 2000s hip-hop and eventually helping negotiate the landmark joint venture deal with Interscope Records in 2002 under the aegis of Eminem's Shady Records and Dr. Dre's Aftermath Entertainment.

In January 2003, gunmen fired shots at Violator's headquarters. The attackers targeted the 11th-floor office's reception area, shooting at its metal and glass doors before fleeing. No injuries were reported, as no one was in the reception area at the time. Lighty and other staff were present but unharmed. Police and Violator Management declined to comment on the incident. That February, 50 Cent released his debut album, Get Rich or Die Tryin'. Highly anticipated, the album debuted and peaked at number one on the Billboard 200, with first week sales of over 870,000 copies. As of 2025, the album has been certified 9× platinum by the RIAA for total sales of nine million units in America.

In March 2005, 50 Cent released his second studio album, The Massacre, under Violator Management. The album set a record as the sixth fastest selling album since Nielsen SoundScan started tracking albums in 1991, with 1.14 million albums sold in four days. The album was a commercial success, and was only 32,000 records away from being the best-selling album of the year. The Massacre included the hit single, Candy Shop, which debuted at number 1 on the Billboard Hot 100. As of 2025, the album has been certified sextuple platinum in America, with sales in America reaching six million copies. It has sold over nine million copies worldwide.

In November 2006, P. Diddy signed with Violator Management.

== Violator Entertainment ==
This is the list of movies and video games that Violator Entertainment has worked on. Music Manager Leon Derrick Youngblood SR collaborated with Dave Lighty to broker a deal for music producer/recording artist Roccstar, who is signed to Violator as a music producer and is currently working on several artist under the Violator umbrella, Chris Lighty signed off on the deal in 2011.

- Full Clip (2004)
- 50 Cent: Bulletproof (video game, 2005)

== Discography ==
=== Albums ===
Title	Album details	Peak chart positions		Certifications
Title	Album details	US	US R&B	Certifications
Violator: The Album	Released: August 10, 1999; Label: Violator, Def Jam; Format: CD, LP, cassette	8	1	RIAA: Gold
Violator: The Album, V2.0	Released: July 24, 2001; Label: Violator, Loud, Columbia; Format: CD, LP, cassette	10	5	

=== Singles ===
Year	Single	Chart positions			Album
Year	Single	U.S. Hot 100	U.S. R&B	U.S. Rap	Album
1999	"Vivrant Thing" (featuring Q-Tip)	26	7	10	Violator: The Album/Amplified
1999	"Say What" (featuring LL Cool J)	–	–	–	Violator: The Album
2001	"Grimey" (featuring N.O.R.E.)	–	62	18	Violator: The Album, V2.0/God's Favorite
2001	"Livin' the Life" (featuring Prodigy, Jadakiss and Butch Cassidy)	–	78	–	Violator: The Album, V2.0
2001	"What It Is" (featuring Busta Rhymes and Kelis)	63	20	4	Violator: The Album, V2.0/Genesis
2001	"Put Your Hands Up" (featuring LL Cool J)	–	–	50	Violator: The Album, V2.0
2003	"Keep Doin' It" (featuring Mystikal, Dirtbag and Busta Rhymes)	–	92	–	V3: The Good, the Bad & the Ugly
2003	"I C U (Doin' It)" (featuring A Tribe Called Quest and Erykah Badu)	–	–	–	V3: The Good, the Bad & the Ugly

== Clients ==
The following artists and producers were signed to Violator Management.

- 50 Cent
- Busta Rhymes
- Diddy
- N.O.R.E.
- Papoose
- Prodigy
- Q-Tip
- Red Alert
- Saigon
- Uncle Murda
- Winky Wright
- Mobb Deep
- Missy Elliott
- LL Cool J
- Three 6 Mafia
- Lil Scrappy
- Soulja Boy Tell 'Em
- Mariah Carey
- Diggy Simmons
- CeeLo Green (Primary Violator)
- Goodie Mob (Primary Violator)
- Eric Benet (Primary Violator)
- Ginuwine (Primary Violator)
- Yo Gotti

=== Former artists ===
The following artists were signed to Violator Records

- Fat Joe (Violator/Relativity)
- Cormega (Violator/Def Jam)
- CRU (Violator/Def Jam)
- Warren G (Violator/Def Jam)
- Foxy Brown (Violator/Def Jam)
- Da Franchise (Violator/Def Jam)
- The Beatnuts (Violator/Relativity)
- JoJo Pellegrino (Violator/Loud)
- Frankie Cutlass (Violator/Relativity)
- Chi-Ali (Violator/Relativity)
- Mysonne

== Miscellaneous ==
- V3: The Good, the Bad & the Ugly (unreleased) (Violator/Jive/Zomba), 2004)
