= Vivrant Thing =

Single by Q-Tip

from the album Violator: The Album and Amplified
- Released: 5 October 1999 (US); 30 April 2000 (UK)
- Recorded: 1999
- Genre: Hip hop
- Length: 3:11
- Label: Arista
- Songwriters: Kamaal Fareed; Barry White
- Producer: Q-Tip

Q-Tip singles chronology
"Get Involved" (1999)	"Vivrant Thing" (1999)	"Hot Boyz" (1999)

"Vivrant Thing" is the first single released by Q-Tip on his debut solo album Amplified. It was produced by Q-Tip himself, and is credited as such in the liner notes of Violator: The Album, A Tribe Called Quest's compilation The Anthology, and the 12-inch vinyl/CD single. Jay Dee is only credited in the liner notes of Amplified, as they were considered a production duo solely for that album. "Vivrant Thing" became the fourth rap song to reach number one on the Billboard Hot R&B Airplay chart since its 1992 inception. The single also reached number seven on the main Hot R&B Singles & Tracks chart, with its performance being driven overwhelmingly by airplay due to its lack of domestic availability in any configuration besides 12-inch vinyl.

The single was a success, charting the Billboard Hot 100 at number 26, making it Q-Tip's highest charting solo single to date, as well as his only Top 40 solo single to date. The beat contains a sample of "I Wanna Stay" by the Love Unlimited Orchestra. The remix features stanzas by rappers Missy "Misdemeanor" Elliott and Busta Rhymes.

The song was used as the opening scene on the television series, The Game, in the episode, "The List Episode", on March 30, 2008. The beat was frequently used in the animated series MTV Downtown. It was heard in the PEN15 episode, "Miranda".

== Critical reception ==
Kris Ex of Rolling Stone called the song an "undeniable groove vehicle". Steve Jones of USA Today also described the tune as "bouncy and insistent".

== Music video ==
The music video was directed by Hype Williams.

== Charts ==
=== Weekly charts ===
Chart (1999–2000)	Peak position
Scotland Singles (OCC)	50
UK Singles (OCC)	39
UK Hip Hop/R&B (OCC)	11
US Billboard Hot 100	26
US Hot R&B/Hip-Hop Songs (Billboard)	7
US Hot Rap Songs (Billboard)	10
US Rhythmic Airplay (Billboard)	15

=== Year-end charts ===
Chart (1999)	Position
US Hot R&B/Hip-Hop Songs (Billboard)	31
