= Violation =

Violation or violations may refer to:

- Violation (basketball), the most minor class of an illegal action in basketball
- Violation (album), a 1977 album by American hard rock band Starz
- Violation (film), a 2020 Canadian horror film
- Violations (Star Trek: The Next Generation), an episode of the science fiction television series Star Trek: The Next Generation
