= Jamal Woolard =

American actor, rapper, and comedian

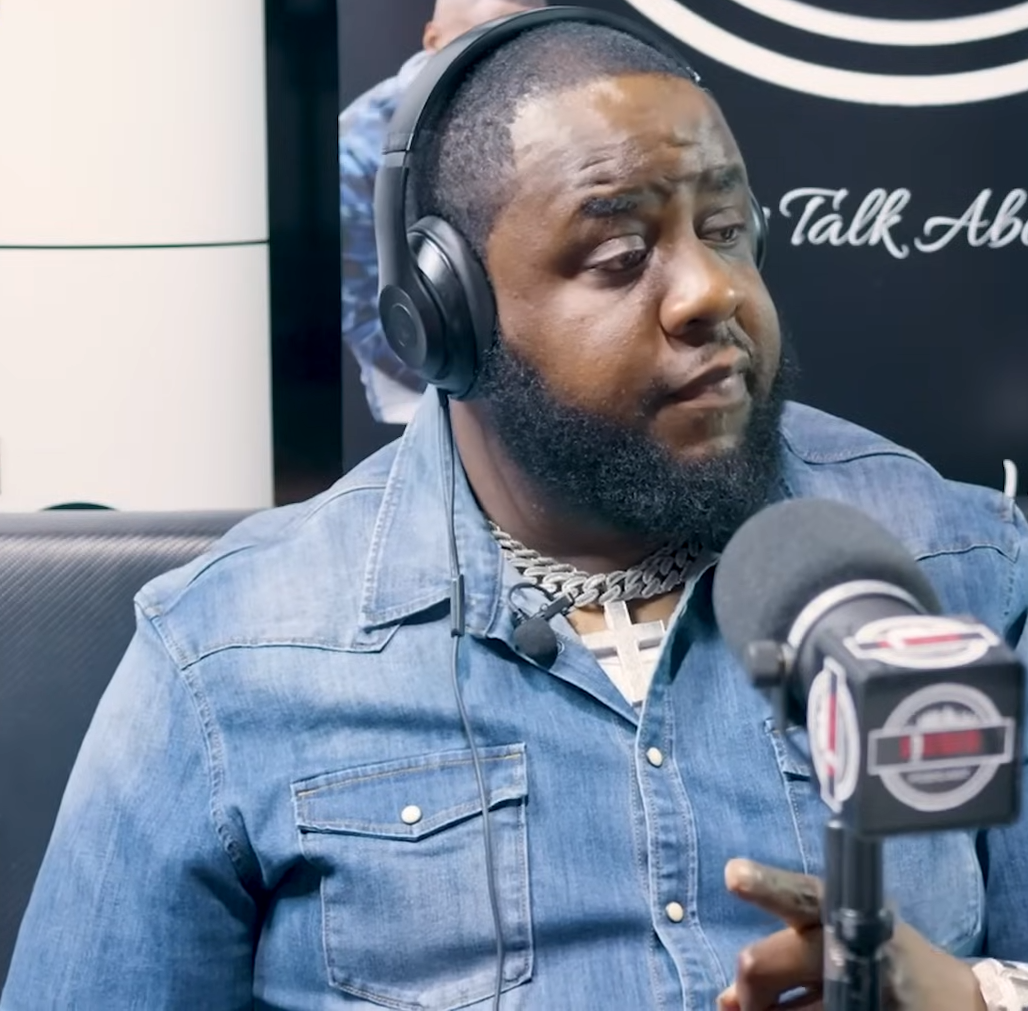
- Woolard in 2024

Background information
- Born: July 8, 1975 (age 51)
- Origin: Brooklyn, New York City, U.S.
- Genre: Hip-hop
- Occupations: Actor, rapper
- Years active: 1999–present
- Labels: Dirty Money; Warner Bros.

Jamal "Gravy" Woolard (born July 8, 1975) is an American actor and rapper. He portrayed rapper The Notorious B.I.G. in the film Notorious, and reprised the role as a supporting character in the Tupac Shakur biopic All Eyez on Me.

== Life and career ==
Woolard is from Bensonhurst Brooklyn and Lafayette Gardens, Brooklyn. He joined the group Da Franchise, which consisted of Red Café and Q Da Kid and were signed by Violator Records. The group released the 2000 single "We Gotta Eat". In real life he raps under the name "Gravy". He is featured in the song "Untouchable" by Tupac Shakur on the Pac's Life album. He had to add over 50 pounds to his frame to play The Notorious B.I.G. in the film Notorious.

Woolard was previously known for being shot near radio station Hot 97 on 26 April 2006 and giving an interview on the Funkmaster Flex show directly afterwards. His music was later banned from play at the station as a result of a policy that bans "music by any artist who is involved in an altercation at the station."

In 2016, he starred in the movie Barbershop: The Next Cut as Marquese.

In 2008, Woolard starred as rapper The Notorious B.I.G. in the Fox Searchlight film Notorious. He later reprised the role in All Eyez on Me (2017), a biopic about Tupac Shakur, and the film City of Lies (2018).

== Mixtapes ==
- Hell Up in Harlem (Hosted by DJ Kay Slay) (2005)
- Who Shot Mayor Goonberg? Polotics as Usual Vol.1 (2006)
- Mayor Goonberg Visits Africa (2006)
- The Come Up Mixtape (2006)
- THE COME UP Mixtape: In Da Trap (2006)
- N.Y. Target (2007)
- Brooklyn Capo (The Come Up Rockstar ED 4) (2007)
- Guess Who's Back (The Official Best of Gravy) (2007)
- Notorious Classics (2008)
- Gravy: Without a Doubt (2008)
- Notorious Gravy (2009)
- Don't Think Its All Gravy [feat. DJ O.P. & Dirty Money] (2015)

== Select filmography ==
- Notorious (2009)
- Battle Scars (2015)
- Barbershop: The Next Cut (2016)
- All Eyez on Me (2017)
- City of Lies (2018)
- Trust Nobody (2021)
- Crossover (2021)
- Rise (2022)
- Trust Nobody 2 (2023)
- Crossover 2: The Revenge (2023)
- Dutch 2 (2023)
- Trust Nobody 3 (2024)
- Memphganistan (TBA)

== Awards and nominations ==
- BET Awards
  - 2009: Best Actor, Nominated
- Black Reel Awards
  - 2010: Best Breakthrough Performance (Notorious), Nominated
  - 2010: Best Ensemble (Notorious), Nominated
