= Cru (group) =

American hip hop group

CRU
- CRU circa 1997; left to right: Chadio, Yogi and Mighty Ha

Background information
- Also known as: Rhythm Blunt Cru
- Origin: The Bronx, New York City, U.S.
- Genres: Hip hop
- Years active: 1995–1999
- Label: Def Jam
- Past members: Chadio; Mighty Ha; Yogi

CRU was an American hip hop group formally signed to Def Jam Recordings composed of three members, The One Chadio, Mighty Ha and Yogi. The group's first appearance was the "We Got It Goin' On" remix by R&B group Changing Faces in 1995. Two years later the group released their debut album, Da Dirty 30, which featured two singles "Just Another Case" and "Bubblin'". After the release of the album, the group disbanded with Yogi becoming a hip hop producer when he joined Puffy Combs's Hitmen Production Team.

== Discography ==
=== Studio album ===
Year	Title	Chart positions		
Year	Title	U.S.	U.S. R&B	U.S. Heatseekers
1997	Da Dirty 30: Released: June 15, 1997; Label: Def Jam	102	26	1

=== Singles ===
Year	Single	Chart positions			Album
Year	Single	U.S. 100	U.S. R&B	U.S. Rap	Album
1997	"Just Another Case"	68	28	8	Da Dirty 30
1997	"Bubblin'"	-	-	23	Da Dirty 30
