= Chris Lighty =

American music industry executive (1968–2012)

- Born: Darrel Steven Lighty; May 8, 1968; The Bronx, New York City, U.S.
- Died: August 30, 2012 (aged 44); The Bronx, New York City, U.S.
- Other name: Baby Chris
- Occupations: Music manager; record producer
- Years active: 1989–2012
- Musical career
- Genre: Hip hop
- Label: Violator

Darrel (Note: His passport, according to some news sources and an official Brazilian source (recording his visit there), indicates this spelling, although news sources have also spelled his name ending with an additional l.) Steven "Chris" Lighty (May 8, 1968 – August 30, 2012) was an American music manager and record producer. He co-founded Violator, a record label, management and marketing company, which represented hip hop and R&B artists such as Busta Rhymes, A Tribe Called Quest, Nas, Mobb Deep, Missy Elliott, LL Cool J, Noreaga, Prodigy, 50 Cent, Mariah Carey and Sean "Diddy" Combs. The New York Times called him "one of the most powerful figures in the hip-hop business."

== Early life ==
Lighty was born in the Bronx, New York City, New York, and raised in the Bronx River Housing Projects. His mother was single. He had five siblings, including a brother, Dave. He attended Samuel Gompers High School, and did not attend college, and he stated that he "got [his] MBA in hell," in reference to growing up on the streets of a dangerous neighborhood.

== Career ==
Lighty began working in the music industry by carrying vinyl record crates for DJ Red Alert. Later, Russell Simmons' company, Rush Artist Management, hired him. After leaving Rush, Lighty co-founded Violator Management with Mona Scott-Young in 1996; the company is named after the gang he belonged to in the Bronx. Violator was responsible for getting L.L. Cool J his first Gap commercial in 1997. Lighty developed endorsements for Sprite with A Tribe Called Quest, AT&T with Diggy Simmons, and for Mountain Dew with Busta Rhymes.

In 2002, Lighty and a DJ from Chicago, DJ Scrap Dirty, created The Violator Allstar DJs. "We wanted to build a situation for the DJs who might need more muscle," Lighty remarked. He appeared in the September 2004 Electronic Arts video game Def Jam: Fight for NY as himself under the moniker "Baby Chris".

Lighty worked for Def Jam, Jive and Loud Records. He was chief executive of the Brand Asset Group. In 2004, Lighty brokered the largest brand endorsement deal in hip hop to date. He was the architect of what turned out to be one of the most lucrative deals in hip hop history: rapper 50 Cent's Vitamin Water pact. When Coca-Cola paid $4.1 billion for Vitamin Water's company Glaceau three years later, 50 Cent received $100 million, and Lighty received an undisclosed sum.

In September 2009, Lighty joined the Advisory Board of Purista premium cocktail mixers to aid in the execution of the company's strategic marketing plans.

In 2011, Lighty launched the website pleaselistentomydemo.com, which allowed new artists to submit their music online and have top music executives listen to it for a US$10 fee. (The site is no longer active.)

In 2011, Violator merged with another company, Primary Wave to form Primary Violator.

== Personal life ==
Lighty married his wife Veronica in 2003. Together they had two children, daughter Deja (born 1995) as well as a son (born 2007). He also had four other children from previous relationships including daughter Tiffany (born 1995). In 2011, Veronica filed for divorce but at the time of Lighty's death, she claimed to have retracted her original request.

He had reportedly been under scrutiny for income tax issues for amounts up to US$5 million, but this was resolved with the sale of a Manhattan property of his; other sums were also owed.

== Death ==
On August 30, 2012, Lighty was found dead on the patio of his North Riverdale, Bronx apartment from an apparent self-inflicted gunshot wound to the head. The New York Daily News reported that "a gun shot was heard and Lighty was found lying face-up with a 9mm pistol next to his body". Forbes magazine reported that he had been involved in an argument with his wife Veronica not too long before his body was discovered.

Lighty's brother and many other celebrity figures stated that they did not believe that the death was a suicide and that the family would be staging its own private independent investigation and would share any solid findings with the public. Rapper 50 Cent, a client and close friend of Chris, also questioned the suicide claim; he hired a team to investigate the details of the incident, at the request of Lighty's mother. Friend and rapper Papoose questions Lighty's death as suicide in the song "Obituary 2012".
