= Foxy Brown discography =

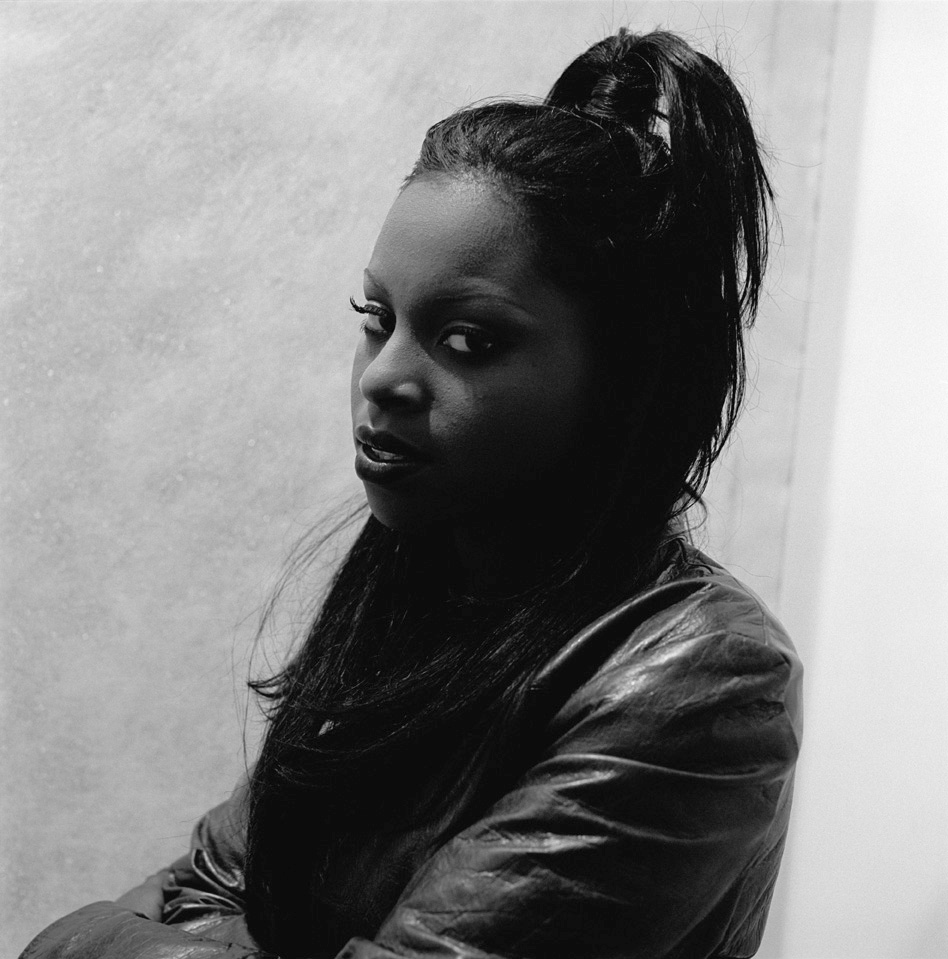
- Studio albums: 4
- Compilation albums: 1
- Singles: 16
- Music videos: 20
- Street album: 1

The discography of American rapper Foxy Brown contains three studio albums, one collaborative album, one mixtape, and 16 singles. Brown made her solo debut as a feature on "I Shot Ya" in 1995. Her debut album Ill Na Na released November 19, 1996, became the first female rap album to chart in the Top 10 of Billboard 200 and certified Platinum within three months of its release. Ill Na Na charted in the U.S., Canada, United Kingdom, Switzerland, Germany, France, and the Netherlands. She continued her success with The Firm: The Album in 1997 a collaborative album uniting Nas, Az, and Brown. It became her first No. 1 album on Billboard 200 and was certified Gold in Canada carrying on her international success. In 1998 she released her first single to her 2nd solo studio album Chyna Doll with "Hot Spot". In January 1999 she released Chyna Doll which became the first solo female rap album to debut at No. 1 on Billboard 200 landing a spot in the Guinness World Records of 1999. It was certified Platinum within two months by RIAA and became her highest-charting album around the world. In July 2001 she released her long-awaited third solo studio album Broken Silence which was certified Gold by RIAA. Two years later, "Na Na Be Like" despite being a non single from Broken Silence, became a Grammy nominated song for Best Female Rap Solo Performance. Her albums Ill Na Na 2: The Fever set to release in 2003 and Black Roses set to release in 2005 were shelved. In 2007 she was sentenced to prison in Rikers Island. During this time her mixtape Brooklyn's Don Diva was released.

== Albums ==
=== Studio albums ===
Title	Details	Peak chart positions										Sales	Certifications
Title	Details	US	US R&B	BEL	CAN	FRA	GER	NL	SWI	UK	UK R&B	Sales	Certifications
Ill Na Na	Released: November 19, 1996; Label: Def Jam; Formats: CD, LP, cassette, digital download	7	2	—	41	—	27	80	—	98	15	US: 1,450,834	RIAA: Platinum; BPI: Silver; MC: Gold
Chyna Doll	Released: January 26, 1999; Label: Def Jam; Formats: CD, LP, cassette, digital download	1	1	—	6	35	7	42	18	51	5	US: 844,000	RIAA: Platinum
Broken Silence	Released: July 17, 2001; Label: Def Jam; Formats: CD, LP, cassette, digital download	5	3	44	22	58	26	77	15	93	19	US: 580,138	RIAA: Gold
"—" denotes a recording that did not chart or was not released in that territory.

=== Collaborative album ===
Title	Details	Peak chart positions							Sales	Certifications
Title	Details	US	US R&B	CAN	GER	FRA	NL	UK	Sales	Certifications
The Firm: The Album	Released: October 21, 1997; Label: Aftermath; Formats: CD, LP, cassette, MD	1	1	8	51	54	51	82	US: 925,000	MC: Platinum

=== Compilation album ===
Title	Details
Icon	Released: May 27, 2014; Label: Def Jam; Formats: CD

=== Miscellaneous ===
List of miscellaneous albums, with selected information
Title	Album details	Notes
Ill Na Na 2: The Fever	Released: May 6, 2003 (US) (Shelved); Label: Def Jam, Bad Boy, Ill Na Na Entertainment	
Black Roses	Released: July 26, 2005 (US); (Shelved): Label: S. Carter, Roc-A-Fella, Def Jam	

== Street Album ==
Title	Details	Peak chart positions				Sales
Title	Details	US	US R&B	US Ind.	US Rap	Sales
Brooklyn's Don Diva	Released: May 13, 2008; Label: Koch, Black Rose; Formats: CD, digital download	83	5	8	2	US: 30,000

== Singles ==
=== As lead artist ===
Title	Year	Peak chart positions										Certifications	Album
Title	Year	US	US R&B/HH	AUS	CAN	FRA	GER	NL	NZ	SWE	UK	Certifications	Album
"Get Me Home" (featuring Blackstreet)	1996	—	—	79	—	44	—	15	8	—	11	RMNZ: Gold	Ill Na Na
"I'll Be" (featuring Jay-Z)	1997	7	5	—	—	—	48	33	20	51	9	RIAA: Gold	Ill Na Na
"Big Bad Mamma" (featuring Dru Hill)	1997	53	10	—	—	—	30	41	8	51	12		How to Be a Player (Soundtrack)
"Firm Biz" (with The Firm featuring Dawn Robinson)	1997	—	35	—	22	—	—	53	25	—	18		The Firm: The Album
"Hot Spot"	1998	91	22	—	50	—	—	54	47	—	31		Chyna Doll
"I Can't" (featuring Total)	1999	—	61	—	26	—	—	—	—	—	—		Chyna Doll
"J.O.B." (featuring Mýa)	1999	—	—	—	—	—	—	—	—	—	—		Chyna Doll
"B.K. Anthem"	2001	—	82	—	—	—	—	—	—	—	—		Broken Silence
"Oh Yeah" (featuring Spragga Benz)	2001	—	63	88	—	69	68	42	—	—	27		Broken Silence
"Candy" (featuring Kelis)	2001	—	48	—	—	—	—	—	—	—	—		Broken Silence
"Stylin'"	2002	—	71	—	—	—	—	—	—	—	—		Ill Na Na 2: The Fever (shelved)
"I Need a Man" (featuring The Letter M.)	2003	—	62	—	—	—	—	—	—	—	—		Ill Na Na 2: The Fever (shelved)
"Magnetic" (featuring Pharrell Williams)	2003	—	—	—	—	—	—	—	—	—	—		Ill Na Na 2: The Fever (shelved)
"Come Fly with Me" (featuring Sizzla)	2005	—	45	—	—	—	—	—	—	—	—		Black Roses (shelved)
"We Don't Surrender" (featuring Grafh)	2007	—	—	—	—	—	—	—	—	—	—		Brooklyn's Don Diva
"When the Lights Go Out" (featuring Kira)	2007	—	—	—	—	—	—	—	—	—	—		Brooklyn's Don Diva
"Star Cry"	2008	—	—	—	—	—	—	—	—	—	—		Brooklyn's Don Diva
"U Ain't Ruff Enough" (featuring Rekage)	2011	—	—	—	—	—	—	—	—	—	—		
"—" denotes a recording that did not chart or was not released in that territory.

=== As featured artist ===
List of singles as featured artist, with selected chart positions and certifications, showing year released and album name
Title	Year	Peak chart positions								Certifications	Album
Title	Year	US	US R&B	US Rap	GER	NLD	NZ	SWE	UK	Certifications	Album
"Hooked on You (Trackmasters Remix)" (Silk featuring Foxy Brown and Tyme)	1995	—	—	—	—	—	—	—	—		Non-album single
"No One Else (Puff Daddy Remix)" (Total featuring Foxy Brown, Lil' Kim and Da Brat)	1996	—	—	—	—	—	—	—	—		Total
"Ain't No Nigga" (Jay-Z featuring Foxy Brown)	1996	50	17	4	—	—	—	—	31		Reasonable Doubt/The Nutty Professor (Soundtrack)
"One for the Money (Clark Kent Remix)" (Horace Brown featuring Foxy Brown)	1996	—	—	—	—	—	—	—	—		Non-album single
"Touch Me, Tease Me" (Case featuring Foxy Brown and Mary J. Blige)	1996	14	4	—	—	—	10	—	26	RIAA: Gold	Case/The Nutty Professor (Soundtrack)
"You're Makin Me High (Groove Remix)" (Toni Braxton featuring Foxy Brown)	1996	—	—	—	—	—	—	—	—	*RIAA: Platinum	Non-album singles
"Love Is All We Need (Remix)" (Mary J. Blige featuring Foxy Brown)	1997	—	—	—	—	—	—	—	—		Non-album singles
"(Always Be My) Sunshine" (Jay-Z featuring Foxy Brown and Babyface)	1997	95	37	16	18	66	—	42	25		In My Lifetime, Vol. 1
"What's Your Fantasy (Remix)" (Ludacris featuring Trina, Shawnna and Foxy Brown)	2001	—	—	—	—	—	—	—	—	RIAA: Platinum	Back for the First Time
"And We" (Sean Combs featuring Black Rob, Big Azz Ko, Kain Cioffie, G. Dep, Foxy Brown, Craig Mack and The M)	2002	—	—	—	—	—	—	—	—		Barbershop OST
"Too Much for Me" (DJ Kayslay featuring Foxy Brown, Nas, Amerie and Baby)	2003	—	53	—	—	—	—	—	—		The Streetsweeper, Vol. 1
"More or Less" (Shyne featuring Foxy Brown)	2004	—	92	—	—	—	—	—	—		Godfather Buried Alive
"U Already Know" (112 featuring Foxy Brown)	2005	32	3	—	—	—	—	—	—		Pleasure & Pain
"—" denotes a recording that did not chart or was not released in that territory.

== Music videos ==
List of music videos appearances
Title	Year	Director
"I Shot Ya"	1995	Hype Williams
"Ain't No Nigga"	1996	Abdul Malik Abbott
"Touch Me, Tease Me"	1996	Brett Ratner
"Get Me Home"	1996	Hype Williams
"The Party Don't Stop"	1996	Michael Martin & Master P
"I'll Be"	1997	Brett Ratner
"Big Bad Mamma"	1997	Joseph Kahn
"Ill NaNa"	1997 (Unreleased)	(Unknown)
"Firm Biz"	1997	Hype Williams
"Always Be My Sunshine"	1997	Hype Williams
"Hot Spot"	1998	Joseph Kahn
"I Can't"	1999	Billie Woodruff & Foxy Brown
"Thong Song"	2000	Joseph Kahn & Little X
"B.K Anthem"	2001	Director X
"Oh Yeah"	2001	Director X
"Tables Will Turn"	2001	(Unknown)
"Too Much for Me"	2003	Kevin DeFreitas
"I Need a Man"	2003 (Unreleased)	Director X

== Guest appearances ==
List of non-single album appearances, with other performing artists, showing year released and album name
Title	Year	Other artist(s)	Album
"I Shot Ya (Remix)"	1995	LL Cool J, Keith Murray, Prodigy, Fat Joe	Mr. Smith
"Freestyle"	1996	—N/a	Bad Boy Volume 3
"Watch Dem Niggas"	1996	Nas	It Was Written
"Affirmative Action"	1996	The Firm	It Was Written
"Shoutout to Clue"	1996	DJ Clue	Springtime Stick Up Part 2: The Pay Back
"Friend"	1997	Puff Daddy, Simone Hines	No Way Out
"Release Some Tension"	1997	SWV	Release Some Tension
"Freestyle #5"	1997	Funkmaster Flex	The Mix Tape, Vol. II
"The Case"	1997	DJ Clue, 4 Dolo	Show Me the Money
"Party Don't Stop"	1997	Mia X, Master P	Unlady Like
I Gotta Know"	1998	Playa	Cheers 2 U
"Trial of the Century"	1998	AZ, Panama P.I.	Pieces of a Man
"10% Dis"	1998	Funkmaster Flex, Pretty Boy	The Mix Tape, Vol. III
"Paper Chase"	1998	Jay-Z	Vol. 2... Hard Knock Life
"You Ain't Seen Nothin"	1998	Mack 10, Jermaine Dupri	The Recipe
"Dollar Bill"	1998	R. Kelly	R.
"Burning Down the House"	1998	Andre Rison	NFL Jams 2
"My Niggaz"	1998	Kid Capri, The LOX	Soundtrack to the Streets
"That's the Way"	1998	DJ Clue, Fabolous & Mase	The Professional
"Na Na Be Like"	1999	—N/a	Blue Streak (soundtrack)
"Bang Bang"	2000	Capone-N-Noreaga	The Reunion
"Too Stoosh"	2000	Spragga Benz	Fully Loaded
"More"	2000	Baby Cham	Wow... The Story
"Thong Song (Remix)	2000	Sisqó	Nutty Professor II: The Klumps (soundtrack)
"So Hot"	2001	DJ Clue	The Professional 2
"Blow My Whistle"	2001	Hikaru Utada	Rush Hour 2 (soundtrack)
"What Yall Niggas Want"	2001	AZ	9 Lives
"Picture This"	2001	Benzino	The Benzino Project
"B.K. Made Me"	2001	DJ Clue	Stadium Series Pt. 3 Let The Games Begin!
"Nothin'" (Remix)	2002	N.O.R.E., Pharrell Williams, P. Diddy, Capone, Final Chapter and Musaliny-N-Maze	Nothin' (Remix)
"Talkin' to Me" (Trackmasters Remix)	2002	Amerie	Talkin' to Me (Remix)
"2 ill"	2003	DJ Envy Loon, Coke and XO	The Desert Storm Mixtape: Blok Party, Vol. 1
"If It Ain't One Thing"	2003	Luther Vandross	Dance with My Father
"Got it Locked"	2003	Pitch Black	Pitch Black Law
"My Life (Cradle 2 the Grave)"	2003	Althea	Cradle 2 the Grave (soundtrack)
"Whatcha Gonna Do"	2003	None	Bringing Down the House (soundtrack)
"The Gang"	2004	Shyne	Godfather Buried Alive
"Haitian Mafia"	2004	Wyclef Jean	Welcome to Haiti: Creole 101
"Got to Get It"	2004	Tha Dogg Pound	The Last of Tha Pound
"Pretty Girl Bullshit"	2004	Mario Winans	Hurt No More
"Does He Love Me"	2004	Keshia Chanté	Keshia Chanté
"Stop"	2004	R. Kelly and Jay-Z	Unfinished Business
"Thank You Girl"	2004	Mr. Vegas	Pull Up
"Hmm Hmm (Remix)"	2006	Beenie Man	Hmm Hmm (Remix)
"Mr. DJ"	2007	DJ Clue, Barrington Levy	The Storm Ultimatum
"Brooklyn Go Hard (Remix)"	2008	Jay-Z, Santigold, Wayne Wonder	Brooklyn Go Hard (Remix)
"So Special (Remix)"	2008	Mavado	So Special (Remix)
"Murda Mami"	2009	Rick Ross, Magazeen	Deeper Than Rap
"Coco Chanel"	2018	Nicki Minaj	Queen
"Full Circle"	2020	Nas, The Firm	King's Disease
"Intro"	2024	Young Devyn	Bod Gyal Music
