= Brooklyn's Don Diva =

Studio album by Foxy Brown
- Released: May 13, 2008 (US)
- Recorded: Chung King Studios, New York; 2007
- Genre: Hip hop
- Labels: Black Rose; Koch
- Producers: Street Radio; Matheo; Jamal Doctor; Arnold Mischkulning; John 'Jayd' Daniels; Fizzy Womack; Stereotype; Young Gavin

Foxy Brown chronology
Ill Na Na 2: The Fever (Unreleased)	Brooklyn's Don Diva (2008)

Singles from Brooklyn's Don Diva
- 1. "We Don't Surrender" Released: September 25, 2007; 2. "When the Lights Go Out" Released: November 13, 2007; 3. "Star Cry" Released: February 12, 2008

Professional ratings
Aggregate scores
Source	Rating
Metacritic	47/100
Review scores
Source	Rating
About.com	3/5 stars
AllMusic	2.5/5 stars
DJBooth.net	3/5 stars
Okayplayer	36/100
Robert Christgau	(dud)
Rolling Stone	2.5/5 stars
RapReviews.com	7.0/10
Spin	2/5 stars

Brooklyn's Don Diva is the first street album by American rapper Foxy Brown. Released in the US on May 13, 2008, it was intended to be the follow-up to 2001's Broken Silence. According to Rolling Stone magazine, the street album would be released prior to Black Roses, the album that she has been working on since 2004 and was recorded in Chung King Studios in New York City. The street album was released in the UK on June 2, 2008, and in Japan on July 16, 2008. Several tracks ("When the Lights Go Out", "We Don't Surrender", "Star Cry") have been released to iTunes, as intended singles to promote the street album. Three of the mixtape's tracks were produced by Polish beatmaker Matheo.

The album's release had been delayed multiple times, primarily due to Foxy Brown's jail sentence. It sold only about 30,000 copies in the US.

== Chart performance ==
The street album peaked at No. 83 on the Billboard 200 chart, No. 8 on the Independent Albums chart, and No. 5 on the Top R&B/Hip-Hop Albums chart.

== Track listing ==
1. "Brooklyn's Don Diva" – 2:36
2. "We Don't Surrender" (featuring Grafh) – 4:06
3. "We're On Fire" (featuring Mavado) – 4:23
4. "Dreams of Fucking a D-Boy" (featuring Jay Rush) – 3:09
5. "When the Lights Go Out" (featuring Kira) – 3:35
6. "Never Heard This Before" (featuring Dwele) – 4:12
7. "Too Real" (featuring AZ) – 2:54
8. "Star Cry" – 4:30
9. "Why"^{[a]} – 4:12
10. "She Wanna Rude Bwoy" (featuring Demarco) – 3:30
11. "The Quan" (featuring Lady Saw)^{[a]} – 3:47
12. "Bulletproof Love/One Love" (featuring Lil' Mo) – 3:49
13. "How We Get Down" (featuring Grafh and Prinz) – 4:30
14. "We Set the Pace" (featuring Morgan Heritage and Spragga Benz) – 4:25
15. "The Quan" (Bonus Track) (featuring Lady Saw) (Hip Hop Mix) – 3:45

Notes

- ^{^[a]} – Originally set to be on her shelved studio album, Ill Na Na 2: The Fever

== See also ==
- 2008 in hip hop
