= How to Be a Player (soundtrack) =

Def Jam's How to Be a Player Soundtrack

Soundtrack album to Def Jam's How to Be a Player by various artists
- Released: August 5, 1997
- Studio: Hollywood Digital (Hollywood, CA); The Hit Factory (New York, NY); Powerhouse Studios (Fern Park, FL); Skip Saylor Studios (Los Angeles, CA); Soundtrack Studios (New York, NY); Mirror Image (Dix Hills, NY); Chung King (New York, NY); No Limit Studios (New Orleans, LA); Oakland City Studios; Echo Sound; Urban House Studio; DARP Studios (Atlanta, GA); The Barnyard Studio; Starlight Studios (Richmond, CA); Quad Studios (New York, NY)
- Genre: Hip-hop; R&B
- Length: 1:15:24
- Label: Def Jam
- Producer: Armando Colon; CMT; DJ Jay-Z; DJ Quik; E-A-Ski; Erick Sermon; G-1; Gerald Baillergeau; James Earl Jones; Jeffrey "J-Dub" Walker; KLC; Marcella Andre; Poke & Tone; Prestige; Rashad Smith; Robert "Fonksta" Bacon; Shorty B; Stanley Brown; T-Mix; Vaughn Wilson; Victor Merritt; Wildstyle

Singles from Def Jam's How to Be a Player soundtrack
- 1. "Big Bad Mama" Released: July 28, 1997; 2. "Never Wanna Let You Go" Released: 1997

Professional ratings
Review scores
Source	Rating
AllMusic	3/5 stars
Entertainment Weekly	A−

Def Jam's How to Be a Player Soundtrack is the soundtrack to Lionel C. Martin's 1997 sex comedy film Def Jam's How to Be a Player. It was released on August 5, 1997, through Def Jam Recordings.

Production was handled by Marcella Andre, DJ Quik, Erick Sermon, G-1, Armando Colon, CMT, DJ J-Z, E-A-Ski, Gerald Baillergeau, James Earl Jones, Jeffrey "J-Dub" Walker, KLC, Poke & Tone, Prestige, Rashad Smith, Robert "Fonksta" Bacon, Shorty B, Stanley Brown, T-Mix, Vaughn Wilson, Victor Merritt and Wildstyle, with co-producers Derick "D Man" McElveen and Kevin Morrison and additional producers Ian Allen and Ira McLaughlin.

It features contributions from Max Julien, EPMD, Foxy Brown, 2Pac, 8Ball & MJG, Absoulute, Black Azz Chill, Cam'ron, Cormega, Crucial Conflict, DMX, Dru Hill, Dymon, Fiend, George Clinton, Hussein Fatal, Ja Rule, Jayo Felony, Junior M.A.F.I.A., Ma$e, Master P, Mic Geronimo, Silkk the Shocker, Playa, Redman, Richie Rich, Rick James, Suga Free, Too $hort and Belita Woods. Its vinyl version, composed of total of forty tracks, contains more Max Julien interludes and a song by Made Men and a song by Kaboom!

In the United States, the soundtrack peaked at number 7 on the Billboard 200 and number 2 on the Top R&B/Hip-Hop Albums charts. It was certified gold by the Recording Industry Association of America on September 16, 1997 for selling 500,000 copies in the US alone.

Its single "Big Bad Mamma" made it to 53 on the US Billboard Hot 100 and number 12 on the UK singles charts. The single "Never Wanna Let You Go" was less successful, reaching only number 6 on the Bubbling Under Hot 100 and number 51 on the Hot R&B/Hip-Hop Songs charts in the US. In the music video for "Young Casanovas" Ma$e's hook was replaced by LeVert.

== Track listing ==
No.	Title	Writer(s)	Producer(s)	Length
1.	"Intro" (performed by Max Julien)	Maxwell Julien Banks	Marcella Andre	0:41
2.	"Big Bad Mamma" (performed by Foxy Brown and Dru Hill)	Shawn Carter; Samuel Barnes; Jean-Claude Olivier; Leon Haywood	Poke & Tone; Kevin Morrison (co.)	3:53
3.	"Hard to Get (Revisited)" (performed by Rick James and Richie Rich)	James Ambrose Johnson Jr.	DJ Quik; G-One	5:10
4.	"I Gotta Know" (performed by Playa and Foxy Brown)	Benjamin Bush; Inga Marchand; James Earl Jones; Derrick McElveen; Lorenzo Patterson; Andre Young	James E. Jones; Derrick "D Man" McElveen (co.)	3:57
5.	"Young Casanovas" (performed by Junior M.A.F.I.A., Ma$e and Cam'ron)	James Lloyd; Rayshaun Spain; Mason Betha; Cameron Giles; Rashad Smith; Reginald Calloway	Rashad Smith; Armando Colon	4:22
6.	"Down Wit Us" (performed by Redman)	Reginald Noble; Erick Sermon; Lawrence Parker	Erick Sermon	3:18
7.	"Usual Suspects" (performed by Mic Geronimo, DMX, Hussein Fatal, Cormega and Ja Rule)	Michael McDermon; Earl Simmons; Bruce Washington; Corey McKay; Jeffrey Atkins; Daven Vanderpool	Daven "Prestige" Vanderpool	4:41
8.	"How to Be a Playa" (performed by Master P, Silkk the Shocker and Fiend)	Percy Miller; Vyshonn Miller; Richard Jones; Craig Lawson	KLC	5:15
9.	"It's a Cold Day (The Funk Wit U Mix)" (performed by Too $hort, George Clinton and Belita Woods)	Todd Shaw; George Clinton; Stuart Jordan	Vaughn Wilson; Shorty B	4:53
10.	"Interlude" (performed by Max Julien)	Banks	Marcella Andre	0:53
11.	"Street 2 Street" (performed by Jayo Felony)	James Savage; Shon Adams; Mark Ogleton	E-A-Ski; CMT	3:43
12.	"In the Wind" (performed by 8Ball & MJG)	Premro Smith; Marlon Goodwin; Tristan Jones	T-Mix	4:40
13.	"Never Seen Before" (performed by EPMD)	Sermon; Parrish Smith; Art Neville; Leo Nocentelli; Joseph Modeliste; George Porter Jr.	Erick Sermon; Ian Allen (add.); Ira McLaughlin (add.)	2:53
14.	"Never Wanna Let You Go" (performed by Absoulute)	Corey Green; C. Ward; Lamont Maxwell; Brandon Casey; Brian Casey	Jeffrey "J-Dub" Walker	4:23
15.	"When the Playas Live" (performed by Crucial Conflict)	Marrico King; Corey Johnson; Wondosas Martin; Ralph Leverston; Terrell Harris	Wildstyle	4:57
16.	"Troublesome" (performed by 2Pac)	Tupac Shakur; Jeremy Jackson	J-Z	3:50
17.	"Say What" (performed by Dymon)	Kelly Price; Saeida Hall; Stanley Brown; Craig Mack; Osten Harvey	Stanley Brown	4:00
18.	"If U Stay Ready (Remix)" (performed by Suga Free)	Dejuan Walker; David Blake; George Archie; Robert Bacon; Wilbert Milo	DJ Quik; G-One; Robert "Fonksta" Bacon	5:00
19.	"Don't Ever" (performed by Black Azz Chill)	William Warner; Gerald Baillergeau; Victor Merritt	Big Yam; Victor Merrit	3:48
20.	"Outro" (performed by Max Julien)	Banks	Marcella Andre	1:07
Total length:				1:15:24

Sample credits

- Track 2 contains a sample of "She's a Bad Mama Jama (She's Built, She's Stacked)" written by Leon Haywood and performed by Carl Carlton.
- Track 4 contains an interpolation of "Message to B.A." written by Lorenzo Patterson and Andre Young.
- Track 5 contains an interpolation of "Casanova" written by Reggie Calloway.
- Track 6 contains an interpolation of "Still #1" written by Lawrence Parker.
- Track 7 contains an interpolation of "Mango Meat" written by the Wilson Brothers.
- Track 13 contains an interpolation of "Just Kissed My Baby" written by Art Neville, Leo Nocentelli, Joseph Modeliste and George Porter Jr. and a sample of "Public Enemy #1" written by Carlton Ridenhour and James Henry Boxley III.
- Track 17 contains a sample of "Flava in Ya Ear" written by Craig Mack and Osten Harvey and performed by Craig Mack.

== Personnel ==
- A&R: Chris Lighty, Ian Allen, Irv Gotti, Jo-Jo Brim
- Design – The Drawing Board
- Executive-Producer – Bill Bellamy, Kevin Liles, Lyor Cohen, Marcella Andre, Russell Simmons, Tina Davis
- Management [Marketing] – Chonita Floyd
- Mastering – James Cruz
- Photography – Jim Sheldon

== Charts ==
=== Weekly charts ===
Chart (1997)	Peak position
UK R&B Albums (OCC)	29
US Billboard 200	7
US Top R&B/Hip-Hop Albums (Billboard)	2

=== Year-end charts ===
Chart (1997)	Position
US Billboard 200	171
US Top R&B/Hip-Hop Albums (Billboard)	61

== Certifications ==
Region	Certification	Certified units/sales
United States (RIAA)	Gold	500,000^{^}
^{^} Shipments figures based on certification alone.
