= Big Bad Mama (Foxy Brown song) =

Single by Foxy Brown featuring Dru Hill

from the album Ill Na Na and Def Jam's How to Be a Player soundtrack
- B-side: "Never Seen Before"; by EPMD
- Released: July 28, 1997
- Recorded: 1996
- Genre: Hip hop
- Length: 3:53
- Label: Def Jam
- Songwriters: Shawn Carter; Samuel Barnes; Jean-Claude Olivier; Leon Haywood
- Producer: Trackmasters

Foxy Brown singles chronology
"I'll Be" (1997)	"Big Bad Mama" (1997)	"Firm Biz" (1997)

"Big Bad Mama" is a single by American rapper Foxy Brown and American R&B group Dru Hill from the soundtrack to the 1997 film, How to Be a Player. The song also appeared on the European re-issue of Foxy Brown's debut album, Ill Na Na.

The song, which was produced by the Trackmasters and based on an interpolation of Carl Carlton's "She's a Bad Mama Jama", became a semi-successful hit, peaking at 53 on the Billboard Hot 100, Foxy's second highest charting single as a solo artist. The single was released with the then recently reunited EPMD's "Never Seen Before" as the B-side.

== Single track listing ==
=== A side ===
1. "Big Bad Mama" (LP version)
2. "Big Bad Mama" (instrumental)

=== B side ===
1. "Never Seen Before" (LP version)
2. "Never Seen Before" (LP instrumental)
3. "Never Seen Before" (remix)

== Charts ==
=== Weekly charts ===
Chart (1997)	Peak position
Europe (European Hot 100 Singles)	45
Germany (GfK)	30
Netherlands (Dutch Top 40)	33
Netherlands (Single Top 100)	41
New Zealand (Recorded Music NZ)	8
Scotland Singles (OCC)	48
Sweden (Sverigetopplistan)	51
Switzerland (Schweizer Hitparade)	23
UK Hip Hop/R&B (OCC)	3
UK Dance (OCC)	2
UK Singles (OCC)	12
US Billboard Hot 100	53
US Dance Singles Sales (Billboard)	3
US Hot R&B/Hip-Hop Songs (Billboard)	10
US Hot Rap Songs (Billboard)	9
US Rhythmic Airplay (Billboard)	20

=== Year-end charts ===
Chart (1997)	Position
UK Urban (Music Week)	29
US Hot R&B/Hip-Hop Songs (Billboard)	65
