= Candy (Foxy Brown song) =

2001 single by Foxy Brown

Single by Foxy Brown featuring Kelis

from the album Broken Silence
- B-side: "730"
- Released: August 21, 2001
- Genre: Dance-pop; R&B
- Length: 3:45
- Label: Def Jam
- Songwriters: Inga Marchand; Pharrell Williams; Charles Hugo; Juan Cordova
- Producer: The Neptunes

Foxy Brown singles chronology
"Oh Yeah" (2001)	"Candy" (2001)	"Stylin'" (2002)

Kelis singles chronology
"What It Is" (2001)	"Candy" (2001)	"Young, Fresh n' New" (2001)

"Candy" is a song by American rapper Foxy Brown featuring American singer Kelis, released by Def Jam on August 21, 2001, as the third single from her third studio album Broken Silence (2001). A dance-pop and R&B track, it was produced by the Neptunes duo Pharrell Williams and Chad Hugo, who co-wrote the song alongside Brown and Juan Cordova. Brown raps on the verses while Kelis, a frequent collaborator with the Neptunes, performs the hook. The song was recorded in Virginia Beach and mixed in New York City. "Candy" premiered at the Broken Silence listening party in June 2001, and although it did not receive an official music video, a portion of it was played in the video for the album track "Tables Will Turn".

The song is about cunnilingus. While this sexually explicit content marked a continuity with Brown's earlier material, it set "Candy" apart from the rest of Broken Silence, which tended toward more introspective subject matters. According to critics, the single has elements of 1980s music, dance music, and new wave music and a more pop sound than Brown's previous albums.

"Candy" received a positive response upon release and in retrospective reviews. Music critics compared it to music by other artists, specifically Lil' Kim, while scholars analyzed its representation of black female sexuality. In the US, the song appeared on Billboard charts, reaching the top ten on the Hot Rap Songs chart. "Candy" was included on several soundtracks in the early 2000s; it was featured in the television series Dark Angel and the films Friday After Next and The 40-Year-Old Virgin.

== Production and release ==
The Neptunes duo Pharrell Williams and Chad Hugo produced two songs—"Candy" and "Gangsta Boogie"—for Foxy Brown's third studio album Broken Silence (2001). Billboard's Colin Finan wrote that they had become so prolific in 2001 that they had "laced nearly every R&B/hip-hop hit" that summer, including "Candy". Hugo and Williams co-wrote the single with Juan Manuel Cordova and Brown, who is credited under her legal name Inga Marchand. Cordova has writing credits on five other tracks from Broken Silence.

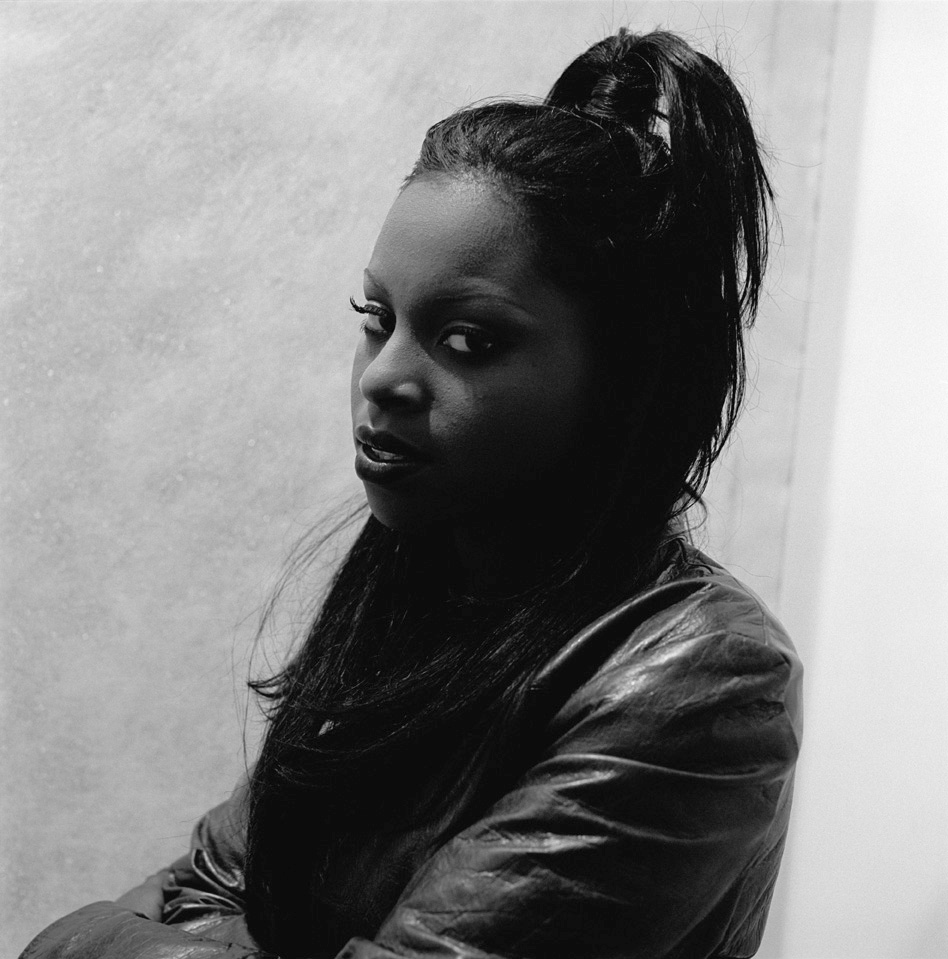
Foxy Brown (pictured in 1998) was a co-writer for "Candy".

"Candy" features vocals by Kelis, a frequent collaborator with the Neptunes. According to music journalist Peter Shapiro, Kelis was the duo's "diva of choice" to sing hooks on other artists' songs. Shapiro noted the diversity of her work, mentioning her contributions to music "for everyone from Foxy Brown to Noreaga". "Candy" was recorded at the Master Sound Recording Studios in Virginia Beach, Virginia. The vocals were handled by David Hummel and Erik Steinert and mixed by Axel Niehaus at Avatar Studios in New York City.

The song debuted at the Broken Silence listening party held in New York City in June 2001. On August 21, 2001, Def Jam released "Candy" in the US as the album's third single, and PolyGram promoted it in the UK in 2002. It was issued as a 12-inch single and a CD single; the 12-inch single included the song's radio edit and instrumental and "730" as its B-side. Elektra produced a pink vinyl record in a limited edition. To promote "Candy", Brown performed a portion of it in the music video for her track "Tables Will Turn".

Following its release, "Candy" was featured on early 2000s soundtracks, appearing in the films Friday After Next (2002) and The 40-Year-Old Virgin (2005). Along with its inclusion on the 2002 soundtrack for the television show Dark Angel, it was played in the season two episode "Some Assembly Required". The song appeared on the 2003 compilation album XXX Hip Hop. AllMusic's Tim Sendra wrote that "Candy", as well as Lil' Kim's "Suck My Dick" and Khia's "My Neck, My Back (Lick It)", represented the "nasty females" on the album.

"Candy" debuted at number 24 on the Bubbling Under Hot 100 Billboard chart dated September 15, 2001. After the single reached number 48 on the Hot R&B/Hip-Hop Songs Billboard chart, The Boombox's Nadine Graham said it had "struggled its way up" to this position. The song also peaked at number 10 on the Hot Rap Songs Billboard chart in September 2001.

== Music and lyrics ==
In comparison to Brown's previous funk-influenced albums, "Candy" has a more pop sound, which HipHopDX's Nomatazele further defined as dance-pop. In MTV News, Shaheem Reid said it was a "sugary party track" that was "Spanish guitar-flavored", while author Anthony J. Fonseca associated its general style with dance music and refrain to pop music. On the other hand, Colin Finan and the Phoenix New Times's Bret McCabe reviewed the single as an R&B track. Along with these genres, "Candy" has 1980s new wave influences. Its instrumental is built on a staccato beat frequently used by the Neptunes. Brown raps the verses "aggressively" over the song's mid-tempo beat. Finan likened her vocal style to a "sexy, husky boom", and said Kelis has a more "high-pitched, childlike sound".

"Candy"
"Candy" has elements of new wave music and 1980s music, and a staccato beat frequently used in the Neptunes's productions.

"Candy" is about cunnilingus, as represented in lyrics such as "let me know when you're ready to eat". Finan wrote that the song is "an ode to oral sex". Due to this content, reviewers have likened the track to a striptease, in which Brown graphically boasts about her sexuality. Although Broken Silence has a larger focus on introspective subject matters, such as "The Letter" being about a suicide attempt, critics noted it still featured sexually explicit songs, like "Candy", as had been the case on Brown's past albums. While discussing this change in style, The Guardian's Caroline Sullivan clarified: "But the sexually provocative Foxy of old isn't completely extinct."

Throughout the song, Brown boasts that she tastes "just like candy". In the lyrics, "Licking my lips / And adjusting my tits and switching my hips", curriculum professor Nichole A. Guillory likened Brown to a seductive stewardess instructing a lover to examine her body. Brown invites the anonymous male subject to "imagine me nude, stretched out" and "nipples all out, bent over the sink", but also gives him a warning: "When I lay on my stomach and throw my legs back / Y'all niggaz won't know how to act." In the third verse, Brown takes on more agency, rapping about her self-worth.

== Reception ==
=== Critical reception ===
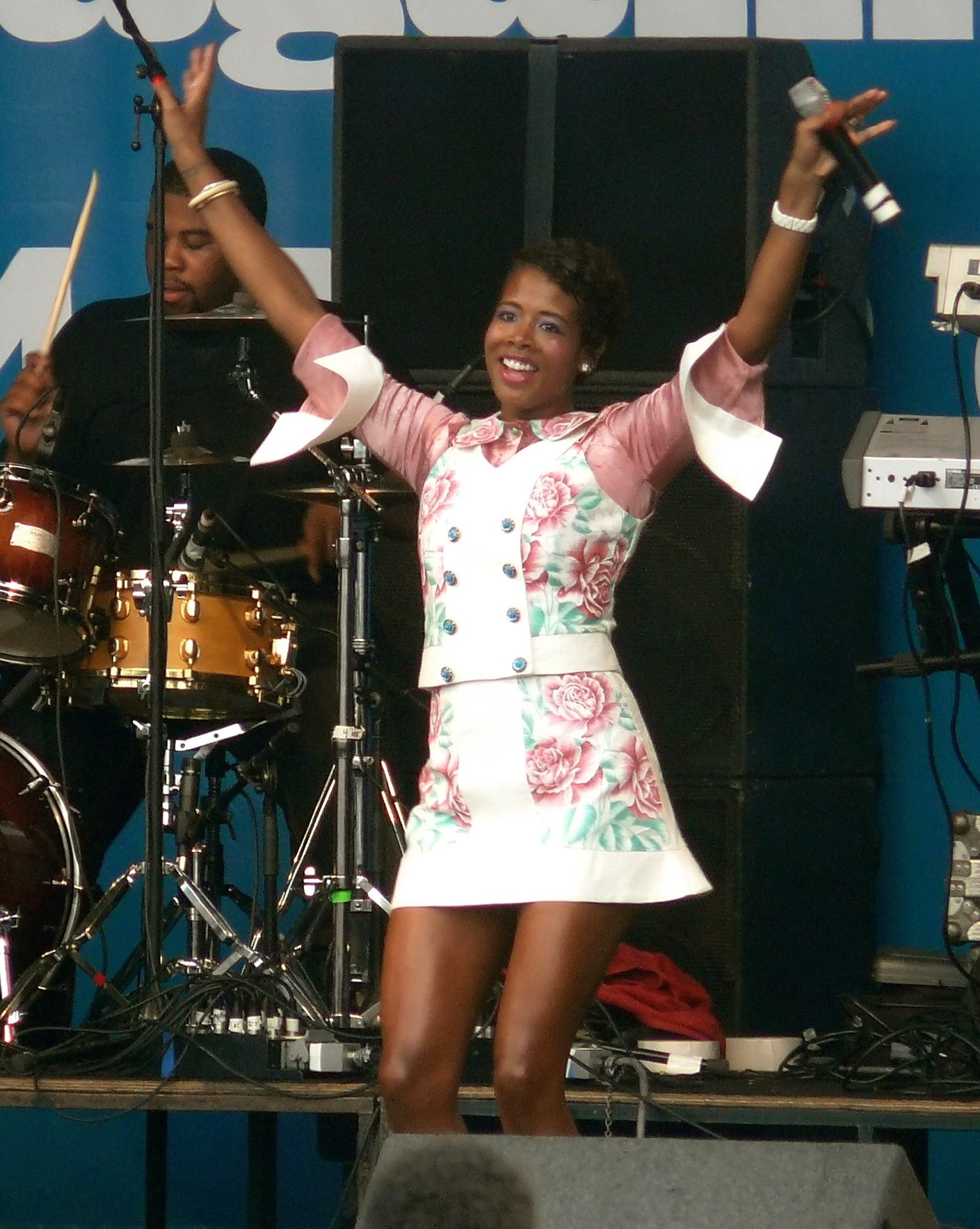
Some critics praised Kelis (pictured in 2007) for her vocals on "Candy".

"Candy" received a positive response from critics, several of whom cited it as a highlight of Broken Silence, including Village Voice critic Robert Christgau, Steve Jones for USA Today, and the Associated Press's Latrice Davis. In a review for The Dallas Morning News, Rob Clark praised the song as "undeniably catchy". Writing for Spin, Joshua Clover described "Candy" as a "strange brew of threatening, hooky, sexy, creepy, and overwhelming" vocals, and wrote that the Neptunes represented Brown's "discreet charm". In Billboard, Colin Finan said the production complimented Brown and Kelis's voices. However, he questioned the song's appeal to some audiences, specifically those of conservative radio stations, due to its sexual content. In a negative review for the Phoenix New Times, Bret McCabe argued Brown's voice was not strong enough for R&B and soul music. Although critically approved, "Candy" did not fare well with the public; Nadine Graham wrote that "the streets hated it".

Retrospective reviews of "Candy" have been positive. Fuse's Jeff Benjamin included it on his 2014 Spotify playlist of the best female collaborations. In 2019, HipHopDX's Dana Scott praised "Candy" as a "pop-worthy earworm" that helped brighten the album's mood. Although Graham described "Candy" as a "sugary sweet, poppy cut", she considered it shallow in comparison to the other, more personal songs in Broken Silence. Kelis was also praised in some retrospective articles. In 2008, The News-Press's Mark Marymont said that although Kelis had "sometimes thin, even whiny vocals", she sounded better on duets like "Candy". Patrick D. McDermott, writing in a 2017 article for The Fader, cited the single as one of her best collaborations; he described the hook as "stone-cold classic Kelis" and "lightyears ahead of its time".

=== Scholarly analysis ===
"Candy" has been the subject of scholarly analysis. Scholar Doyinsola Faluyi cited Brown's appearance on the single's cover as an example of how some black female rappers used their sexuality to promote their image. According to Faluyi, this was a contrast to artists like Da Brat who adopted more masculine styles to conform to "the dominant fashion in male hip-hop culture". The lyrics were discussed by gender studies scholars Jennifer Esposito and Bettina Love who believed Brown's boasts about being the dominant sexual partner disproved psychologist Michelle Fine's theories on "sexuality as victimization". Esposito and Love remarked that Brown's demands for oral sex in the song challenge negative attitudes on sexually active women to instead "make it clear that women can desire sex and can ask for pleasure".

Some scholars were critical of "Candy". Nichole A. Guillory criticized the lyrics as objectifying black women as "territories to be penetrated, occupied and ravaged by men". Guillory noted that Brown does demonstrate some agency while bragging about being priceless. Although she felt this moment was not enough to undo the objectification present in the other lyrics, Guillory acknowledged it as an "important reminder of the ongoing struggle between black women and men for control of black women's bodies". Esposito and Love questioned if Brown was advocating a stereotype that "bad girls are used sexually by men, while good girls are the ones men want to marry".

Reviewers have compared "Candy" to music by other artists, specifically Lil' Kim. Esposito and Love likened the song's candy metaphor to Lil' Kim's "Kitty Box" from her 2005 album The Naked Truth. In a review of Macy Gray's 2001 album The Id, Arion Berger of The Washington Post said the track "Harry" had a "sexual boast as bold" as "Candy", which he described as "supremely nasty". Author Roni Sarig praised the Neptunes's production on "Candy", Beyoncé's "Work It Out", and Common's "I Got a Right Ta" as a "combination of classical soul, blues, and pop bundled with twenty-first century digital mayhem". In a 2020 NPR article, Stephanie Smith-Strickland wrote that "Candy" and Lil' Kim's 1997 single "Not Tonight" helped to establish a trend in music explicitly about cunnilingus. She argued this influence could be heard in Khia's 2002 single "My Neck, My Back (Lick It)", which she said had "carved out a towering space of its own" in that area.

== Track listing ==
12-inch single
No.	Title	Length
1.	"Candy" (radio edit)	3:45
2.	"Candy" (LP version)	3:43
3.	"Candy" (instrumental)	3:43
4.	"730" (radio edit)	4:00
5.	"730" (LP version)	4:12
6.	"730" (instrumental)	4:11

== Credits and personnel ==
Credits adapted from the liner notes of Broken Silence:

Recording locations

- Recorded in Master Sound Recording Studios in Virginia Beach and Avatar Studios in New York City

Personnel

- Foxy Brown – writer
- Kelis – featured artist
- Juan Manuel Cordova – writer
- Chad Hugo – writer
- Pharrell Williams – writer
- The Neptunes – producer
- Axel Niehaus – mixing, studio personnel
- David Hummel – recording, studio personnel
- Erik Steinert – vocal recording, studio personnel

== Charts ==
Weekly chart performance for "Candy"
Chart (2001)	Peak position
US Bubbling Under Hot 100 (Billboard)	24
US Hot R&B/Hip-Hop Songs (Billboard)	48
US Hot Rap Songs (Billboard)	10
