= Hot Spot (song) =

Single by Foxy Brown

from the album Chyna Doll
- B-side: "Big Bad Mamma"; "BWA"
- Released: November 10, 1998
- Recorded: 1998
- Studio: Electric Lady (New York City)
- Genre: East Coast hip hop
- Length: 3:55
- Label: Def Jam Recordings; Ill Na Na
- Songwriters: Inga D. Marchand; Shawn Carter; Irving Lorenzo; Robert Mays
- Producers: Irv Gotti; Lil' Rob

Foxy Brown singles chronology
"Firm Biz" (1997)	"Hot Spot" (1998)	"I Can't" (1999)

"Hot Spot" is a song by American rapper Foxy Brown, released on November 10, 1998 as the lead single from her second album, Chyna Doll. The song was co-produced by Irv Gotti and Lil' Rob, with lyrics co-written by Brown and American rapper Jay-Z.

"Hot Spot" was met with brief commercial success, peaking at 91 on the Billboard Hot 100. The song is Brown's final appearance on the chart as a lead artist.

== Music video ==
The music video was released on November 16, 1998, and was directed by Joseph Kahn and Brown. The video featured Brown in a frozen ice-themed nightclub sporting a metallic bra, which was parodied on a commercial for MTV's 1999 Hip Hop Week advertisement campaign.

== Track listing ==
US CD

(870 835-2; Released: 1999)

1. "Hot Spot" (LP Version - Explicit) - 3:55
2. "Big Bad Mamma" - 3:52
3. "Hot Spot" (Instrumental) - 3:55
4. "Hot Spot" (Video)

US 12" Vinyl

(314 566 499-1; Released: 1998)

- Side A
  1. "Hot Spot" (Radio Edit)
  2. "Hot Spot" (LP Version)
  3. "Hot Spot" (Instrumental)
- Side B
  1. "BWA" (Radio Edit)
  2. "BWA" (LP Version)
  3. "BWA" (Instrumental)

US 12" Vinyl Promo

(DEF 286-1; Released: 1998)

- Side A
  1. "Hot Spot" (Radio Edit)
  2. "Hot Spot" (LP Version)
- Side B
  1. "Hot Spot" (Instrumental)
  2. "Hot Spot" (Acapella)

== Charts ==
Chart performance for "Hot Spot"
Chart (1999)	Peak position
Canada Top Singles (RPM)	54
Canada Dance/Urban (RPM)	10
Netherlands (Dutch Top 40 Tipparade)	8
Netherlands (Single Top 100)	54
New Zealand (Recorded Music NZ)	47
Scottish Singles Sales (Official Charts)	56
UK Singles (Official Charts)	31
UK Hip Hop/R&B (Official Charts)	8
UK Dance (Official Charts)	6
US Billboard Hot 100	91
US Hot R&B/Hip-Hop Songs (Billboard)	22
US Hot Rap Songs (Billboard)	23
US Rhythmic Airplay (Billboard)	37

== Release history ==
Release history and formats for "Hot Spot"
Region	Date	Format(s)	Label(s)	Ref.
United Kingdom	November 10, 1998	12-inch vinyl	Mercury	
United States	November 24, 1998	Rhythmic contemporary	Def Jam	
