= Chyna Doll (album) =

Studio album by Foxy Brown
- Released: January 26, 1999
- Studios: Electric Lady, The Hit Factory (New York City)
- Genre: Hip hop
- Length: 61:30
- Labels: Violator; Ill Na Na; Def Jam
- Producers: Foxy Brown; Charly "Shuga Bear" Charles; D-Dot; D-Moet; Tyrone Fyffe; Irv Gotti; Robert "Shim" Kirkland; Mo-Suave' House Productions; Bernard "Big Demi" Parker; Lil Rob; Swizz Beatz; Kanye West

Foxy Brown chronology
The Album (1997)	Chyna Doll (1999)	Broken Silence (2001)

Singles from Chyna Doll
- 1. "Hot Spot" Released: October 26, 1998; 2. "I Can't" Released: March 2, 1999; 3. "J.O.B." Released: July 2, 1999

Chyna Doll is the second studio album by American rapper Foxy Brown. It was released on January 26, 1999, by Ill Na Na Entertainment, Violator Records and Def Jam Recordings. After the commercial success of her debut album, Ill Na Na (1996), Brown began working on her second album. This time, she insisted on being the executive producer to have a creative control over the album. She collaborated with a number of producers, such as Kanye West, D-Dot, Irv Gotti, Lil Rob, Swizz Beatz and Tyrone Fyffe, among others.

Upon its release, Chyna Doll received mixed reviews from music critics. It debuted at the top of the Billboard 200, making it the first full-rap album by a woman rapper to debut at number-one on the chart, and the second by a woman in hip-hop following The Miseducation of Lauryn Hill by Lauryn Hill. The album was a commercial success. Selling 173,000 copies in its first week, it was later certified platinum by the Recording Industry Association of America (RIAA).

== Background and recording ==
Chyna Doll is the follow-up to Foxy Brown's 1996 platinum debut album Ill Na Na and was recorded in 1998. The album features guest appearances by DMX, Mýa, Total, Jay-Z, Beanie Sigel, Memphis Bleek, Eightball & MJG, Juvenile, Too Short, Pretty Boy (Gavin Marchand, also known as Young Gavin and Nino Brown), Mia X, Tha Dogg Pound, Gangsta Boo, and Noreaga. It also features a special appearance by Pam Grier, the actress who played the original Foxy Brown in the 1974 blaxploitation film. About this album, Brown said, "I wanted to captivate everyone. I wanted to get all the crowds. I wanted to get the Down South crowd, West Coast crowds, East Coast crowds, all the dopest MCs from each part of the world – and we just did our thing. It was dope, it was real hot. I'm very proud with this album."

Recording for her second album began in the summer of 1998. In September 1998, it was reported that Foxy Brown would remake Janet Jackson's classic "What Have You Done for Me Lately" for the upcoming album, as well as an update to N.W.A.'s "Real Niggaz Don't Die", calling it "Bitches with Attitude" featuring Southern female rappers Mia X and Gangsta Boo. During the recording process of the album, alternative rock singer Fiona Apple agreed to make a guest appearance on the album after an invitation from Brown, but due to scheduling differences, the session could not be arranged in enough time to make the final cut. Foxy Brown had also asked Madonna to collaborate on the album, but due to unknown circumstances, nothing ever became of it. Originally, the album was going to be called Femme Fatale and was originally going to be released on November 17, 1998, but Brown decided to delay the release of the album to give her enough time to make sure everything was the way she wanted it.

== Promotion ==
Three singles were released to promote the album. "Hot Spot," the lead single, was serviced to radio on October 26, 1998, and subsequently released commercially on November 10, 1998. It peaked at number 91 on the US Billboard Hot 100, during a period when Billboard had implemented revised Hot 100 criteria in December 1998, introducing a 75 percent airplay and 25 percent physical sales requirement for radio-only singles to qualify for chart inclusion. The second single from Chyna Doll, "I Can't," featuring R&B group Total, and the third single, "J.O.B.," featuring Mya, failed to chart.

In March 1999, it was announced that Foxy Brown would join R. Kelly on the Get Up on a Room world tour featuring Busta Rhymes, Nas, Deborah Cox, and Kelly Price. The tour did face date cancelations due low ticket sales, so venue changes occurred, more dates were added and the tour still went on. However, after a fatal stabbing in Miami, and Rhymes pulling out of the tour, Brown then pursued her own North American Chyna Doll Tour that began in August 1999 and stopped at 22 cities in America.

== Critical reception ==
Professional ratings
Review scores
Source	Rating
AllMusic	2.5/5 stars
Robert Christgau	(3-star Honorable Mention)
Entertainment Weekly	B+
Los Angeles Times	1/4 stars
Rolling Stone	3/5 stars
Rolling Stone Germany	3/5 stars
The Source	3.5/5 stars

Upon initial release, Chyna Doll received mixed to positive reviews. AllMusic's journalist Jose F. Promis rating the album 2.5 stars. He cites, "...for the most part, this album is full of unappealing, pornographic raps, lame beats, and pathetic gangster posturing. The sophomore slump is evident here...". Amazon journalist Oliver Wang states, "Chyna Doll just sounds like any number of New York-based rap albums, especially with its commercial formula of shuffling high hats, catchy hooks, and recycled funk loops. In the end, Brown's self-exploitive (sexually and racially) cover art is likely to offer more provocative statements than the album itself." Entertainment Weekly's Matt Diehl described the album as "beguiling fantasy life of limos and champagne", commending some of the lyrical content that "hints at how painful maintaining the fantasy can be".

In a review for Rolling Stone, Kathryn Farr praised a "strong cast of featured guests and an impeccable collection of begging-for-airplay beats", along with Foxy Brown's vocal performance, criticizing her for "[going] overboard disrespecting her fellow females". Akiba Solomon of The Source called Chyna Doll "a roadmap through the mind of a Black girl whose self-esteem seems to lie largely in money". She complimented introspective tracks such as "My Life", but was dissatisfied with the rest of the album. "Chyna Doll certainly rocks the body. But it also insults the mind and taxes the soul," concluded the journalist. Soren Baker, in a negative review for Los Angeles Times, described the lyrical content of the album as "whiny and uninspired raps". The critic believed that on this album Foxy Brown sounds "remarkably similar" to Lil Kim, while her "hedonistic content pales in comparison to that of such female rappers as MC Lyte and Lauryn Hill". He also panned the production on the album, which he believed "lack[s] the flair, power and distinctiveness of her earlier work".

== Commercial performance ==
Released on January 26, 1999 in the United States, Chyna Doll debuted at number one on the US Billboard 200, selling 173,000 copies in its first week. It marked Brown's first project to top the chart. It also reached the top of Billboard's Top R&B/Hip Hop Albums chart and entered the top ten in Canada and Germany, peaking at number six on the Canadian Albums Chart and number seven on the German Albums Chart, respectively. On March 24, 1999, the album was certified platinum by the Recording Industry Association of America (RIAA) for domestic shipments of over 1 million copies. By June 2007, Chyna Doll had sold 844,000 in the United States.

== Track listing ==
Chyna Doll track listing
No.	Title	Writer(s)	Producer(s)	Length
1.	"The Birth of Foxy Brown" (skit)	Inga Marchand; Benjamin Bush; Carl Clay; Jawaan Peacock; Roy Ayers; Stephen Garrett; Timothy Mosley	Foxy Brown	1:28
2.	"Chyna Whyte"	Marchand; Robert Kirkland	Robert "Shim" Kirkland	3:02
3.	"My Life"	Marchand; Deric Angelettie; Kanye West; John Phillips; Michelle Phillips	D-Dot; West	4:28
4.	"Hot Spot"	Marchand; Irving Lorenzo; Robert Mays	Irv Gotti; Lil Rob	3:50
5.	"Dog & a Fox" (featuring DMX)	Marchand; Earl Simmons; Kaseem Dean	Swizz Beatz	2:57
6.	"JOB" (featuring Mýa)	Marchand; Shawn Carter; Charly Charles; Gwen Guthrie	Charly "Shuga Bear" Charles	3:42
7.	"Bomb Ass" (skit)	Marchand; Calvin Broadus; Delmar Arnaud; Ricardo Brown	Brown	0:59
8.	"I Can't" (featuring Total)	Marchand; Carter; Tyrone Fyffe; George Michael	Tyrone Fyffe	4:48
9.	"Bonnie & Clyde Part II" (featuring Jay-Z)	Marchand; Carter; Fyffe; Angela Winbush; René Moore	Fyffe	4:51
10.	"4-5-6" (featuring Beanie Sigel and Memphis Bleek)	Marchand; Dwight Grant; Malik Cox; Bernard Parker	Bernard "Big Demi" Parker	5:01
11.	"Ride (Down South)" (featuring 8Ball & MJG and Juvenile)	Marchand; Marlon Goodwin; Premro Smith; Terius Gray	Mo-Suave' House Productions	5:41
12.	"Can You Feel Me, Baby" (featuring Pretty Boy)	Marchand; Gavin Marchand; Todd Shaw; Bernard Parker	Parker	3:49
13.	"Baller Bitch" (featuring Pretty Boy and Too $hort)	Marchand; G. Marchand; Shaw; Anthony Moody	D-Moet	3:49
14.	"BWA" (featuring Mia X and Gangsta Boo)	Marchand; Mia Young; Lola Mitchell; Irving Lorenzo; Robert Mays; Andre Young; Colin Wolfe; Dino Fekaris; Nick Zesses; Eric Wright; Lorenzo Patterson; Tracy Lynn Curry; Tracy Nelson	Irv Gotti; Lil Rob	3:26
15.	"Tramp"	Marchand; Fyffe; Gabriel Roth; Philippe Lehman; Victor Axelrod	Fyffe	3:28
16.	"Baby Mother" (skit)	Marchand	Brown	1:26
17.	"It's Hard Being Wifee" (featuring Noreaga)	Marchand; Victor Santiago; Kirkland	Kirkland	4:45
Total length:				61:30

Sample credits

- "Chyna White" contains a sample of "Walk On By" by Isaac Hayes
- "J.O.B." contains a sample of "Ain't Nothin' Goin' On But the Rent" by Gwen Guthrie
- "I Can't" contains a sample of "Everything She Wants" by Wham!
- "Bonnie & Clyde Part II" contains a sample of "Secret Rendezvous" by Rene & Angela
- "Tramp" contains a sample of "The Champ" by The Mohawks

== Charts ==
=== Weekly charts ===
Weekly chart performance for Chyna Doll
Chart (1999)	Peak; position
Canadian Albums (Billboard)	6
Dutch Albums (Album Top 100)	42
European Albums (Music & Media)	26
French Albums (SNEP)	35
German Albums (Offizielle Top 100)	7
Swiss Albums (Schweizer Hitparade)	18
UK Albums (Official Charts)	51
UK R&B Albums (Official Charts)	5
US Billboard 200	1
US Top R&B/Hip Hop Albums (Billboard)	1

=== Year-end charts ===
Year-end chart performance for Chyna Doll
Chart (1999)	Position
US Billboard 200	119
US Top R&B/Hip-Hop Albums (Billboard)	36
Canadian Top Albums/CDs (RPM)	97

== Certifications ==
Certifications and sales for Chyna Doll
Region	Certification	Certified units/sales
United States (RIAA)	Platinum	844,000

== See also ==
- Number-one albums of 1999 (U.S.)
- List of number-one R&B albums of 1999 (U.S.)
