= S. Carter Records =

- Founder: Jay-Z
- Defunct: 2009
- Country of origin: United States

S. Carter Records was a record label formed by Jay-Z. The label included Foxy Brown. The label was formed after The Island Def Jam Music Group, holding a 50% stake in the Roc-A-Fella Records, bought the last 50% of the company. They also appointed Jay-Z the president of Def Jam Recordings, soon after Damon "Dame" Dash and Kareem "Biggs" Burke were released as the co-founders of Roc-A-Fella Records. Dash and Burke have started up Dame Dash Music Group since, which was also distributed by Island Def Jam. In 2009, S. Carter Records dissolved and went out of business after Jay-Z created Roc Nation in 2008, which was actually a 10-year contract agreement between him and concert promotion company Live Nation. Despite the closure, the name still bears copyright on later Jay-Z releases, albeit as "S. Carter Enterprises".

== See also ==
- List of record labels
