= Stanley Brown (musician) =

American musician and music producer

Stanley Brown is an American musician, songwriter and producer. A two-time Grammy nominee, Brown has worked with artists including Karen Clark-Sheard, Dru Hill and TD Jakes.

== Biography ==
Brown is a native of Brooklyn, New York. He began by playing the organ and drums for churches in the local area.

Brown has been friends with fellow Gospel artist Hezekiah Walker since childhood. In 1985, they launched the Love Fellowship Crusade Choir. In 1987, the choir released their debut album I'll Make It, which launched a series of successful albums. Aaron Hall was among the choir's lead singers before departing to form the group Guy. Brown was instrumental in the cultivation of the "Brooklyn Bounce"—a rhythmic musical style led by bold percussion and bouncing keyboard progressions. This sound became Love Fellowship's signature.

=== Crossover success ===
In 1989, Brown took a hiatus from gospel music to pursue a career in other genres. He began keyboards for rap supergroup Run-DMC, appearing on their 1990 album Back From Hell. Brown also wrote Christopher Williams's hit song, "I'm Dreamin'", for the New Jack City soundtrack.

In 1996, Brown produced, wrote, and played for Dru Hill's debut album. He co-wrote and produced "Tell Me", which peaked at No. 5 on the Billboard R&B chart and No. 18 on the Billboard Hot 100 chart. The song was certified gold. AllMusic's Rob Theakston wrote, "Other songs on here are of noteworthy interest only to die-hard Dru Hill fanatics, but it was the monster 'Tell Me' that effectively put Dru Hill near the head of R&B's class of 1996."

Brown's work also includes artists such as The Temptations, LL Cool J, Salt-N-Pepa, Keith Sweat, Charlie Wilson, India Arie, Bell Biv DeVoe, and Melanie Fiona.

=== Return to gospel ===
In 1997, Brown collaborated with Donald Lawrence to produce Karen Clark-Sheard's debut album, Finally Karen. The album peaked at number two on the Billboard Gospel chart and earned a Grammy nomination for Best Contemporary Gospel Album of 1998. AllMusic's Rodney Batdorf stated, "From the outset, it's clear that she has decided to broaden her appeal by bringing in urban R&B influences. Clark-Sheard works with producer/songwriter Donald Lawrence, Stanley Brown...and the result is a joyous, inspirational album."

Brown's ability to successfully navigate the lines of secular and sacred caught the attention of American preacher T. D. Jakes. Brown traveled with Jakes as his accompanying organist from 1997 to 1999. He also produced Jakes' Sacred Love Songs album in 1999.

In 2019, Brown established his own production company, Timeless Music Group, with a distribution deal with RocNation. His single "God Is Good", which features Hezekiah Walker, Karen Clark-Sheard, and Kierra Sheard, is nominated for a Grammy for Best Gospel Song/Performance at the 66th Annual Grammy Awards.

In 2022 he received an Honorary Doctorate of Sacred Music from Dominion Theological Seminary. As of January 2024, Brown is the music director for Greater Allen A. M. E. Cathedral of New York.
