= I'll Be (Foxy Brown song) =

1997 single by Foxy Brown

Single by Foxy Brown featuring Jay-Z

from the album Ill Na Na
- B-side: "La Familia"
- Released: March 4, 1997
- Genre: Hip hop
- Length: 3:00
- Label: Violator; Def Jam
- Songwriters: Shawn Carter; Jean-Claude Olivier; Samuel Barnes; Angela Winbush; René Moore; Bobby Watson; Bruce Swedien
- Producer: Trackmasters

Foxy Brown singles chronology
"Get Me Home" (1996)	"I'll Be" (1997)	"Big Bad Mamma" (1997)

Jay-Z singles chronology
"Can't Knock the Hustle" (1996)	"I'll Be" (1997)	"Feelin' It" (1997)

"I'll Be" is a song recorded by American rapper Foxy Brown for her debut studio album, Ill Na Na (1996), featuring Brooklyn-based rapper Jay-Z. It was released as the second single from the album on March 4, 1997, by Violator and Def Jam Recordings. The song was written by Shawn Carter, Jean-Claude Olivier, Samuel Barnes, Angela Winbush, René Moore, Bobby Watson and Bruce Swedien with production by Trackmasters, and samples René & Angela's 1985 song "I'll Be Good". It was recorded at Chung King Studios in New York City, while the mixing of the track was finished at The Hit Factory. "I'll Be" is a hip hop and R&B song with explicit lyrics that revolve around sex and money.

"I'll Be" received positive reviews from music critics and was a commercial success. In the United States, it peaked at number seven on the Billboard Hot 100, becoming both Brown and Jay-Z's highest charting single at the time. On the Hot Rap Singles chart, it reached number two and also peaked within the top 40 in other countries, such as Netherlands, New Zealand and the United Kingdom. "I'll Be" was certified gold by the Recording Industry Association of America (RIAA) two months after its release. It has sold over 500,000 copies and became one of the best-selling records of 1997. To date it remains Brown's only solo top-40 single and her only single to earn a certification.

An accompanying music video was directed by Brett Ratner. "I'll Be" was nominated for Top Hot Rap Single at the 1997 Billboard Music Awards and was ranked number 52 on VH1's "100 Greatest Hip-Hop Songs" list.

== Track listings ==
- US CD single
1. "I'll Be" (LP version) – 3:00
2. "I'll Be" (instrumental)
3. "La Familia" (unreleased LP version)
- UK CD single
1. "I'll Be" (D&A radio mix) – 3:00
2. "I'll Be" (radio edit) – 2:30
- US CD maxi-single
1. "I'll Be" (LP version) – 3:00
2. "I'll Be" (D&A Remix) – 4:47
3. "I'll Be" (Foxy Brown Mix) – 7:18
4. "I'll Be" (DM Club Mix) – 8:38

== Credits and personnel ==
Credits are adapted from the Ill Na Na album liner notes.

- Foxy Brown – vocals
- Jay-Z – vocals, songwriting
- Jean-Claude Olivier – songwriting
- Samuel Barnes – songwriting
- Angela Winbush – songwriting
- René Moore – songwriting
- Bobby Watson – songwriting
- Bruce Swedien – songwriting
- Trackmasters – production, executive production
- Chris Lighty – executive production
- Steve Stoute – executive production
- Mike Fronda – engineering, recording
- Bill Esses – mixing
- Tom Coyne – mastering

== Charts ==
=== Weekly charts ===
Chart (1997)	Peak position
Europe (European Hot 100 Singles)	84
Germany (GfK)	48
Netherlands (Dutch Top 40)	32
Netherlands (Single Top 100)	33
New Zealand (Recorded Music NZ)	20
Scotland Singles (Official Charts)	36
Sweden (Sverigetopplistan)	51
UK Singles (Official Charts)	9
UK Dance (Official Charts)	3
UK Hip Hop/R&B (Official Charts)	2
US Billboard Hot 100	7
US Dance Singles Sales (Billboard)	4
US Hot R&B/Hip-Hop Songs (Billboard)	5
US Hot Rap Songs (Billboard)	2
US Rhythmic Airplay (Billboard)	22

=== Year-end charts ===
Chart (1997)	Position
US Billboard Hot 100	54
US Hot R&B Singles (Billboard)	32
US Hot Rap Singles (Billboard)	4
US Maxi-Singles Sales (Billboard)	31
US Rhythmic Top 40 (Billboard)	72

== Certifications ==
Region	Certification	Certified units/sales
United States (RIAA)	Gold	500,000^{^}
^{^} Shipments figures based on certification alone.

== Release history ==
Region	Date	Format(s)	Label(s)	Ref.
United States	February 11, 1997	Rhythmic contemporary radio	Violator; Def Jam	
United States	March 4, 1997	12-inch vinyl; CD; cassette	Violator; Def Jam	
United Kingdom	June 9, 1997	12-inch vinyl; CD; cassette	Violator; Def Jam	
