= Oh Yeah (Foxy Brown song) =

2001 single by Foxy Brown

Single by Foxy Brown featuring Spragga Benz

from the album Broken Silence
- B-side: "BK Anthem"
- Released: May 4, 2001
- Recorded: 2000
- Genre: Hip hop; dancehall; ragga
- Length: 4:20
- Label: Def Jam
- Songwriters: Inga Marchand; Carlton Grant; Eddie Hill; Frederick "Toots" Hibbert; Bob Marley

Foxy Brown singles chronology
| "I Can't" (1999) | "Oh Yeah" (2001) | "Candy" (2001) |

Alternative cover

"Oh Yeah" is the first single from Trinidadian American female hip-hop artist Foxy Brown's third album Broken Silence.

== Single information ==
"Oh Yeah" was released on May 4, 2001 in the United States. Initially, it was released through the mixtape circuit in late 2000 with alternate lyrics- most notably on Foxy Brown's Best of Foxy Brown mixtape in 2000, hosted by DJ Envy.

The single was unsuccessful, receiving little airplay on urban radio stations (though popular on New York City and the upper East Coast urban stations) and little video rotation on MTV, though it was slightly more successful on BET. It missed the Billboard Hot 100 and peaked on the R&B/Hip-Hop Singles & Track Chart at number 63.

The single featured a sample of the song "54-46 That's My Number" by the Jamaican reggae and ska band Toots & the Maytals. The UK version of the single is enhanced and contains a music video of "Oh Yeah", playable when inserted into a computer. Another version of the single was released without "BK Anthem" and with an alternate cover.

== Music video ==
The music video was shot in Jamaica in the middle of 2001. It starts with Foxy Brown rapping in a forest near the river and later with her then boyfriend and the track's featuring artist Spragga Benz. The second verse shows her at a party with her group Fox 5 (which includes her older brother Gavin Marchand). The song ends with Brown on the stage dancing and performing in front of a crowd. Towards the end of the verse of the performance, a snippet of "Tables Will Turn," a song from Broken Silence comes on briefly.

== B-side ==
"BK Anthem", a song that was originally recorded and released as a street single in late 2000 was released as a B-side to the "Oh Yeah" single. The music video was shot with a camcorder style. The song peaked at number 82 on the US Billboard R&B charts and failed to make the Billboard Hot 100.

== Track listing ==
US single

1. "Oh Yeah" (radio edit) – 4:00
2. "Oh Yeah" (album version) – 4:22
3. "BK Anthem" (radio edit) – 4:19
4. "BK Anthem" (album version) – 4:19

UK single

1. "Oh Yeah" (radio edit) – 4:00
2. "Oh Yeah" (album version) – 4:22
3. "Oh Yeah" (instrumental) – 4:22

== Charts ==
=== Weekly charts ===
Weekly chart performance for "Oh Yeah"
| Chart (2001) | Peak position |
|---|---|
| Europe (European Hot 100 Singles) | 57 |
| France (SNEP) | 69 |
| Germany (GfK) | 68 |
| Netherlands (Dutch Top 40) | 38 |
| Netherlands (Single Top 100) | 42 |
| Scotland Singles (OCC) | 55 |
| Switzerland (Schweizer Hitparade) | 19 |
| UK Hip Hop/R&B (OCC) | 3 |
| UK Dance (OCC) | 3 |
| UK Singles (OCC) | 27 |
| US Hot R&B/Hip-Hop Songs (Billboard) | 63 |
| US Hot Rap Songs (Billboard) | 22 |

=== Year-end charts ===
Year-end chart performance for "Oh Yeah"
| Chart (2001) | Position |
|---|---|
| Switzerland (Schweizer Hitparade) | 96 |
