= Get Me Home (song) =

Single by Foxy Brown featuring Blackstreet

from the album Ill Na Na
- B-side: The Promise
- Released: September 15, 1996
- Recorded: 1996
- Genre: Hip hop; R&B
- Length: 3:50
- Label: Def Jam
- Songwriters: Shawn Carter; Ronald Broomfield; McKinley Horton
- Producers: Trackmasters; Teddy Riley

Foxy Brown singles chronology
"Touch Me, Tease Me" (1996)	"Get Me Home" (1996)	"I'll Be" (1997)

Blackstreet singles chronology
"No Diggity" (1996)	"Get Me Home" (1996)	"Never Gonna Let You Go" (1997)

"Get Me Home" is the first single from Foxy Brown's debut album Ill Na Na. The song features R&B male group Blackstreet. Produced by the production duo Trackmasters, it samples Eugene Wilde's 1984 single, "Gotta Get You Home Tonight".

The song reached number ten on the U.S. Billboard R&B charts. Directed by Hype Williams, the accompanying music video for the song premiered in November 1996, and was in heavy rotation on television music video channels.

== Charts ==
=== Weekly charts ===
Chart (1996–1997)	Peak position
Europe (European Hot 100 Singles)	69
France (SNEP)	44
Netherlands (Dutch Top 40)	15
Netherlands (Single Top 100)	15
New Zealand (Recorded Music NZ)	8
Scotland Singles (OCC)	56
UK Hip Hop/R&B (OCC)	2
UK Dance (OCC)	2
UK Singles (OCC)	11
US R&B/Hip-Hop Airplay (Billboard)	10
US Radio Songs (Billboard)	42
US Rhythmic Airplay (Billboard)	11

Contemplated, Concerned

=== Year-end charts ===
Chart (1997)	Position
New Zealand (Recorded Music NZ)	28

== Certifications ==
Certification for "Get Me Home"
Region	Certification	Certified units/sales
New Zealand (RMNZ)	Gold	15,000^{‡}
^{‡} Sales+streaming figures based on certification alone.
