= I Can't (Foxy Brown song) =

Single by Foxy Brown featuring Total

from the album Chyna Doll
- Released: March 9, 1999
- Recorded: 1998
- Studio: The Hit Factory (New York City)
- Genre: Hip hop; R&B
- Length: 4:47
- Label: Def Jam
- Songwriters: Inga Marchand; Shawn Carter; Keisha Spivey; George Michael
- Producer: Tyrone Fyffe

Foxy Brown singles chronology
"Hot Spot" (1998)	"I Can't" (1999)	"Oh Yeah" (2001)

Total singles chronology
"Sitting Home" (1999)	"I Can't" (1999)	"I Tried" (1999)

"I Can't" is a song recorded by American rapper Foxy Brown featuring the R&B girl group Total. It was released as the second single from her second studio album Chyna Doll in 1999 by Def Jam.

== Single information ==
"I Can't" was released on March 16, 1999 in the United States. The single was unsuccessful, receiving little airplay on urban radio stations and little video rotation on MTV, though it was slightly more successful on BET and The Box. It became her first single to miss the Billboard Hot 100 and peaked on the R&B/Hip-Hop Singles & Track Chart at number 61.

The single featured a sample of the song, "Everything She Wants" by the pop duo Wham!.

== Track listing ==
1. "I Can't" (featuring Total)
2. "Dog & a Fox" (featuring DMX)
3. "Il Na Na" (featuring Method Man)
4. "Hot Spot" (video)

== Charts ==
Chart performance for "I Can't"
Chart (1999)	Peak position
Canada (Nielsen Soundscan)	26
US Hot R&B/Hip-Hop Songs (Billboard)	61

== Release history ==
Release dates and formats for "I Can't"
Region	Date	Format(s)	Label(s)	Ref.
United States	March 9, 1999	Urban contemporary radio	Def Jam	
United States	March 16, 1999	CD	Def Jam	
United States	April 5, 1999	Rhythmic contemporary radio	Def Jam	
United Kingdom	July 19, 1999	CD	Def Jam	
