= Stylin' =

Single by Foxy Brown

from the album Ill Na Na 2: The Fever
- Released: July 2002
- Recorded: 2002
- Genre: Rap; hip hop
- Length: 3:26
- Label: Bad Boy; Def Jam; Ill Na Na
- Songwriter: Inga Marchand
- Producer: Laban Z. Reeves

Foxy Brown singles chronology
"Candy" (2001)	"Stylin'" (2002)	"I Need a Man" (2003)

"Stylin'" is the first single from the Afro-Trinidadian American female hip-hop artist Foxy Brown's unreleased studio album Ill Na Na 2: The Fever.

== Single information ==
"Stylin'" was officially released to radio in summer 2002, starting on New York City's Hot 97 radio station. The song was in rotation in some urban markets, but only managed to peak at 71 on the U.S. Billboard Hip Hop and R&B charts and missing the Billboard Hot 100 completely. A remix with Birdman, N.O.R.E., Loon and Foxy Brown's older brother Young Gavin was later released in fall 2002 to promote the expected release of Foxy's Ill Na Na 2: The Fever album, which was cancelled. The song was commercially released on Red Star Sounds Volume 2: B-Sides and The Source Hip Hop Hits; Vol. 6.

== Music video ==
In a radio interview with the DJ and radio personality Tim Westwood in 2002, Foxy Brown's brother Gavin said a video for the song was scheduled to be made in New York City, but because the song celebrates the Burberry clothing, he and Foxy were going to shoot the video in London, England, with Tim Westwood. The video was never recorded or released, though an MTV promotional commercial for The Real World was shot with the song.
