= Ill Na Na 2: The Fever =

Album by Foxy Brown

Studio album by Foxy Brown
- Released: May 6, 2003 (intended); February 26, 2020 (leak); June 5, 2026 (archived)
- Recorded: October 2001 – March 2003
- Genre: Hip hop
- Labels: Ill Na Na; Bad Boy; Def Jam
- Producers: Young Gavin, The Neptunes, DJ Clark Kent, Prolyfic, Laban Z. Reeves, Jazze Pha, Ski Beatz, 7 Aurelius

Foxy Brown chronology
Broken Silence (2001)	Ill Na Na 2: The Fever (2005)	Black Roses (2005)

Singles from Ill Na Na 2: The Fever
- 1. "Stylin'" Released: July 2002; 2. "I Need a Man" Released: 2003; 3. "Magnetic" Released: 2003

Ill Na Na 2: The Fever is an unreleased studio album by American rapper Foxy Brown, originally meant to be her fourth album. The album was scheduled to be released on May 6, 2003, by Ill Na Na Entertainment, Bad Boy Records, and Def Jam Recordings. However, the album was canceled as a result of disagreements between Foxy Brown and executive producer Sean Combs.

== History ==
Brown began recording the follow-up album to her previous release, Broken Silence, in the summer of 2001. Early in April 2002, she decided to title it Ill Na Na 2: The Fever. Amid rumors that Brown wanted to leave Def Jam, the album was initially to be released on July 2, 2002. In the middle of that month, Sean Combs offered to be co-executive producer. With a tentative release date of November 19, the first single would be the remix of "Stylin'", featuring Loon, Birdman, N.O.R.E., and Brown's brother Gavin. With a delayed release to May 2003 and plans to produce the album more like her latest (Broken Silence) rather than her original Ill Na Na, Brown started working with R&B singers Anita Baker and Lauryn Hill on the album in early 2003, and "I Need A Man" became the lead single. On April 16, 2003, Brown announced in an interview on The Wendy Williams Show on New York City radio station WBLS that she decided to terminate work on the album; the album would have been released on May 6. It was confirmed by MTV that the album would contain collaborations with Lauryn Hill, Anita Baker, Luther Vandross, Spragga Benz, Shabba Ranks, P. Diddy, Capone-N-Noreaga, Fox 5, Kori, and Ludacris.

On February 26, 2020, the album was leaked on iTunes and Apple Music. Foxy responded on Instagram by threatening to sue whoever leaked the shelved album. She deleted the post shortly after. In 2026, an enhanced version in stereo format was submitted on Archive.org and Audiomack.

== Recorded Tracks ==
1. Fever (featuring Anita Baker or Anita Baker sample)
2. The Storm
3. The Letter pt. 2 (featuring Luther Vandross)
4. Open Book
5. We Makin It (featuring Young Gavin & Red Handed)
6. Ménage-á-Trois (featuring Ludacris)
7. Superfreak
8. Nasty (featuring P. Diddy)
9. How U Want It (featuring Benzino & Mousey Baby)
10. Magnetic (featuring Pharrell Williams)
11. Jumpin' (featuring Fox-5)
12. Stylin'
13. Stylin' (Remix (featuring Baby, Loon, N.O.R.E. and Young Gavin)
14. Why, Why, Why
15. The Original (reworked as The Don Of Dons (Put De Ting Pon Dem) by Super Cat featuring Jadakiss for The Neptunes Presents… Clones)
16. Rap's Bible
17. Streets Love Me (featuring Baby Cham) - this was later reworked as "The Quan" featuring Lady Saw for Black Roses, then Brooklyn's Don Diva
18. Ice (featuring Nelly Furtado)
19. Get Off Me
20. Black Girl Lost (produced by DJ Clark Kent)
21. Watcha Gonna Do
22. Cruel Summer
23. Everyday People (featuring Lauryn Hill)
24. Memory Lane
25. Fan Love
26. I Need a Man (featuring The Letter M aka Celeste Stoney, née Scalone)
27. Cradle 2 The Grave (featuring Althea Heart)

2021 Leak:

1. Open Book
2. We Makin’ It
3. How You Want It
4. Magnetic
5. The Original
6. Superfreak
7. Memory Lane
8. Why
9. Jumpin’
10. Black Girl Lost
11. Rap’s Bible
12. Fan Love
13. Stylin’

2026 Leak:

1. Misunderstood (Intro)
2. Open Book
3. We Makin’ It (feat. Young Gavin & Red Handed)
4. The Don of Dons (Put The Ting Pon Dem) (feat. Super Cat & Jadakiss)
5. Stylin'
6. Cruel Summer
7. Magnetic (feat. Pharrell Williams)
8. Jumpin' (feat. Fox 5)
9. Memory Lane
10. The Quan (feat. Lady Saw)
11. Superfreak (feat. Jazze Pha)
12. Why
13. I Need A Man (feat. Celeste Stoney)
14. Black Girl Lost
15. Rap’s Bible
16. Fan Love
