= Broken Silence (album) =

Studio album by Foxy Brown
- Released: July 17, 2001
- Genre: Hip hop
- Length: 72:15
- Labels: Violator; Ill Na Na; Def Jam
- Producers: Young Gavin; Dave Kelly; The Neptunes; Robert Kirkland; Ski; Lofey; Tamir "Nokio" Ruffin; Kenya "Fame Flames" Miller; DJ Clue

Foxy Brown chronology
Chyna Doll (1999)	Broken Silence (2001)	Ill Na Na 2: The Fever (shelved)

Singles from Broken Silence
- 1. "Oh Yeah" Released: May 4, 2001; 2. "B.K. Anthem" Released: May 4, 2001; 3. "Candy" Released: August 21, 2001

Broken Silence is the third album by American rapper Foxy Brown. It was released on July 17, 2001, by Violator and Ill Na Na Entertainment, with distribution handled by Def Jam Recordings. Looking for a more street-oriented sound, much different from her mainstream image with her previous album Chyna Doll, Brown worked with a variety of musicians on the album, including Dave Kelly, Robert Kirkland, The Neptunes, Tamir "Nokio" Ruffin, Kenya "Fame Flames" Miller, and DJ Clue.

The album received generally positive reviews, with critics praising its "musical openness," wordplay, and blend of styles, while noting its "frailty and vulnerability," though some felt weaker tracks kept it from shining. Commercially, Broken Silence debuted at number five on the US Billboard 200, was certified gold in the United States, and achieved moderate international success, particularly within R&B charts. The song "Na Na Be Like" was nominated for a Grammy Award in 2003, two years after its release.

== Singles ==
"Oh Yeah" is the first single from Trinidadian American female hip-hop artist Foxy Brown's third album Broken Silence. The music video was shot in Jamaica in the middle of 2001. It starts with Foxy Brown rapping in a forest near the river and later with her then boyfriend and the track's featuring artist Spragga Benz.

"BK Anthem", a song that was originally recorded and released as a street single in late 2000 was released as a B-side to the "Oh Yeah"s single. The music video was shot with a camcorder style. The song peaked at number 82 on the U.S. Billboard R&B charts and failed to make the Billboard Hot 100

"Candy" was never officially released, only as a vinyl release. The song had no official video, and Brown refused to concede to Def Jams wishes to release the song, based on its huge popularity, instead, preferring to release "Tables Will Turn". Despite this, and the fact it had little to no official promotion, no music video, it was hugely successful on the radio; it managed to chart at 48 on the R&B/Hip-Hop Singles & Track Chart and number 10 on the Rap charts. "Candy" is the highest charted song from the album. The song was also featured on many soundtracks, noticeably, the film The 40-Year-Old Virgin, Dark Angel Sound track and Friday After Next.

== Critical reception ==
Professional ratings
Review scores
Source	Rating
AllMusic	3/5 stars
Entertainment Weekly	B−4
The Guardian	3/5 stars
HipHopDX	4/5 stars
NME	7/10
RapReviews	7/10
Spin	7/10
The Source	4/5 stars
Vibe	3.5/5 stars
The Village Voice	(1-star Honorable Mention)

AllMusic editor Jose F. Promis wrote that Brown "was up to her old tricks" on Broken Silence but also "extended her musical wings and embraced other styles." He concluded that the album was "a musical step forward, and [a] compelling testament to the life of a girl from the hood." Cheo Tyehimba from Entertainment Weekly found that the album "serves up hip-hop with a decidedly dancehall feel" and that Brown "works several songs like a champion." He added that rote cuts like "I Don't Care," featuring "pedestrian keyboard production" kept the album "from shining." NME critic Dele Fadele praised the album's "musical openness," and said Brown "more than holds her own" with guests. He concluded that "this new Foxy has lots going for her [and] she's gonna be around for a lot longer than people expected." Dan Aquilante of The New York Post highlighted Brown's unflinching autobiographical approach, stating that she "pulls no punches as she raps about the headlines she's generated," while still offering "a couple of nice guest turns."

Caroline Sullivan from The Guardian observed that Broken Silence marked a departure for Brown, as it revealed moments of "frailty and vulnerability" amid a turbulent two-year period. While Brown's previously bold and sexually provocative persona appeared on tracks such as "Candy" and "So Hot," Sullivan noted that the album was exposing her "as fragile." Writing for Spin, Jon Caramanica praised Brown's "wordplay" on Broken Silence, describing it as "both clever and kinda touching," with "confession and consternation." He concluded that the album, "rich with reggae influences and unreconstructed ruffneck rhymes," had "the stark and brooding air of urban realism" and was "a classic out of time, kinda like its protagonist." Vibe editor Craig Seymour wrote that Brown "consistently comes off as an incendiary loose cannon" and called Broken Silence her "third and most accomplished album," praising her "swift, bottom-heavy voice" and "deep-rooted Jamaican influence." Michael Paoletta, writing for Billboard, found that Broken Silence represented Brown's "strongest and most multifaceted set to date."

== Commercial performance ==
In the United States, Broken Silence debuted at number five on the Billboard 200, with first-week sales of 131,000 copies. This represented a slight decline compared to Brown's previous album, Chyna Doll (1999), which had debuted at number one with 173,000 units sold. Broken Silence also opened at number three on the Top R&B/Hip-Hop Albums chart. On August 20, 2001, the album was certified gold by the Recording Industry Association of America (RIAA) for shipments of 500,000 copies, and by June 2007, it had sold 553,000 units in the United States.

Internationally, the album performed solidly in Europe, peaking at number 15 in Switzerland and number 26 in Germany. while also charting in France, Belgium, and the Netherlands. In the United Kingdom, Broken Silence had a more modest showing, peaking at number 93 on the UK Albums Chart, though it fared better on the UK R&B Albums chart, where it reached number 19. In Canada, the album peaked at number 22 on the national albums chart and number 11 on the R&B chart.

== Legacy ==
Rapper Nicki Minaj has stated that Broken Silence was a huge influence for her as a young girl. In 2025, Pitchfork placed Broken Silence at number 98 on their list of the "100 Best Rap Albums of All Time". The website's writer Alphonse Pierre said: "Broken Silence, her third album, dropped when she was 22, and Foxy was in full creative control, meshing together her pain, street-rap attitude, and West Indian roots like nobody else could."

== Track listing ==
Broken Silence track listing
No.	Title	Writer(s)	Producer(s)	Length
1.	"Intro – Broken Silence"	Inga Marchand; Lamont Porter	EZ Elpee; Axel Niehaus; Erik Steinert; Young Gavin	2:16
2.	"Fallin'" (featuring Young Gavin)	I. Marchand; Gavin Marchand; Franklin Crum; Salah El Sharnoubi; Mohamed El Bana	Livin' Proof; Young Gavin	3:09
3.	"Oh Yeah" (featuring Spragga Benz)	I. Marchand; Bob Marley; Carlton Grant; Eddie Hill; Frederick Hibbert	Eddie Scoresazy	4:21
4.	"B.K. Anthem"	I. Marchand; Robert "Shim" Kirkland	Kirkland	4:19
5.	"The Letter" (featuring Ronald Isley)	I. Marchand; David Willis; Georges Garvarentz; Sheila Fergson	Ski	6:58
6.	"730"	I. Marchand; Dennis DeYoung; Michael Sandlofer	Lofey	4:13
7.	"Candy" (featuring Kelis)	I. Marchand; Chad Hugo; Pharrell Williams	The Neptunes	3:44
8.	"Tables Will Turn" (featuring Baby Cham)	I. Marchand; Dameon Beckett; Dave Kelly	Kelly	3:32
9.	"Hood Scriptures"	I. Marchand; G. Marchand; Crum; Eliya Abu Shedid; Yaacoub Al Khubayzi	Livin' Proof; Young Gavin	3:47
10.	"Run Dem" (featuring Baby Cham)	I. Marchand; Beckett; Kelly	Kelly	3:58
11.	"'Bout My Paper" (featuring Mystikal)	I. Marchand; Michael Tyler; Willis; Friedmann Joseh	Ski	4:00
12.	"Run Yo Shit" (featuring Capone-N-Noreaga)	I. Marchand; G. Marchand; Kiam Holley; Victor Santiago; Kirkland; Tamir Ruffin	Kirkland; Nokio^{[a]}	4:23
13.	"Nana Be Like"	I. Marchand; Kenya "Fame Flames" Miller; T. Ruffin	Miller; Nokio	3:35
14.	"Gangsta Boogie"	I. Marchand; Hugo; Williams; James McCants; LeRoy McCants	The Neptunes	4:14
15.	"I Don't Care" (featuring Kori)	I. Marchand; G. Marchand	Live Wire; Young Gavin	2:19
16.	"So Hot" (featuring Young Gavin)	I. Marchand; G. Marchand	DJ Clue; Ken "Duro" Ifill	3:43
17.	"Saddest Day" (featuring Wayne Wonder)	I. Marchand; Anthony Kelly; Von Wayne Charles	Tony "CD" Kelly	4:44
18.	"Broken Silence" (additional vocals: Darius)	I. Marchand; G. Marchand; RaaShaun Casey; Renan Thybulle; Richard Page; Steve George; John Lang	DJ Envy; Mono; Young Gavin	4:57
Total length:				72:15

Notes

- ^{^[a]} signifies a co-producer

Sample credits

- "Fallin'" contains a sample from "Kol De Eshaat" as performed by Samira Said.
- "Oh Yeah" contains samples from "Africa Unite" by Bob Marley and "Live Up Yourself" and "54-46 Was My Mother" by Byron Lee.
- "The Letter" contains a sample from "The Golden Lady" as performed by The Three Degrees.
- "730" contains an interpolation from "Light Up" as performed by Dennis DeYoung.
- "Hood Scriptures" contains a sample from "Ya Bo Ye" as performed by Ragheb Alama.
- "'Bout My Paper" contains a sample from "Rahsaan Roland Kirk" as performed by Missus Beastly.
- "Gangsta Boogie" contains an interpolation of "Gangster Boogie".
- "Broken Silence" contains a sample from "Broken Wings" as performed by Mr. Mister.

== Charts ==
=== Weekly charts ===
Weekly chart performance for Broken Silence
Chart (2001)	Peak position
Belgian Albums (Ultratop Wallonia)	44
Canadian Albums (Nielsen SoundScan)	22
Canadian R&B Albums (Nielsen SoundScan)	11
Dutch Albums (Album Top 100)	77
European Albums (Music & Media)	77
French Albums (SNEP)	58
German Albums (Offizielle Top 100)	26
Swiss Albums (Schweizer Hitparade)	15
UK Albums (Official Charts)	93
UK R&B Albums (Official Charts)	19
US Billboard 200	5
US Top R&B/Hip-Hop Albums (Billboard)	3

=== Year-end charts ===
Year-end chart performance for Broken Silence
Chart (2001)	Position
Canadian R&B Albums (Nielsen SoundScan)	66
Canadian Rap Albums (Nielsen SoundScan)	32
US Billboard 200	188
US Top R&B/Hip-Hop Albums (Billboard)	63

== Certifications and sales ==
Certifications and sales for Broken Silence
Region	Certification	Certified units/sales
United States (RIAA)	Gold	553,000
