= Ill Na Na =

Album by Foxy Brown

Studio album by Foxy Brown
- Released: November 19, 1996
- Recorded: 1995–1996
- Studios: The Hit Factory; Chung King Studios; Battery Studios (New York City, New York)
- Genre: Hip hop
- Length: 41:11
- Labels: Violator; Def Jam
- Producers: Trackmasters; Divine Allah; China Black; Charly Charles; Rich Nice; George Pearson; Teddy Riley; Trackmasters

Foxy Brown chronology
Ill Na Na (1996)	The Album (1997)

Singles from Ill Na Na
- 1. "Get Me Home" Released: September 15, 1996; 2. "I'll Be" Released: March 4, 1997; 3. "Big Bad Mamma" Released: July 28, 1997

Ill Na Na is the debut studio album by American rapper Foxy Brown. It was released by Def Jam Recordings on November 19, 1996 in the United States. Recorded between 1995 and 1996, the album was primarily produced by the Trackmasters and features guest appearances from Blackstreet, Havoc, Method Man, Kid Capri, and Jay-Z. Lyrically, it centers on themes of fashion, sex, and the mafia, showcasing Brown's confident and seductive delivery over sleek, contemporary production.

Ill Na Na was praised for Brown's confident, seductive delivery and charisma, though some critics noted repetitive freestyles. Commercially, the album debuted at number seven on the US Billboard 200, selling 128,000 copies in its first week, and has since sold over 1.4 million copies in the United States, earning a platinum certification from the Recording Industry Association of America (RIAA). It also received a gold certification in Canada and a silver certification for over 60,000 copies sold in the United Kingdom.

Three singles were released from Ill Na Na, including lead single "Get Me Home" and the more successful follow-up "I'll Be," which peaked at number seven on the US Billboard Hot 100. The album broke new ground for female rappers, becoming the first female rap album to debut in the top 10 of the Billboard 200, the first to earn certified plaques outside the United States, and the highest-selling female rap album of 1996, reaching platinum status within 2.7 months.

== Background and recording ==
Brown began working on the album after being discovered by the production team Trackmasters and appearing on a number of singles by other artists, such as LL Cool J, Case and Jay-Z. The immediate success of the singles led to a bidding war at the beginning of 1996, and in March, Def Jam Recordings won and signed the then 17-year-old rapper to the label. Between 1995 and 1996, Brown went into the recording studio to record her debut studio album, originally set to be released in October 1996. Mostly produced by Trackmasters, Ill Na Na features guest appearances from Blackstreet, Havoc, Method Man, Kid Capri and Jay-Z. Lyrically, the album mainly focuses on themes of fashion, sex and mafia.

== Promotion ==
Ill Na Na produced three singles. Lead single, "Get Me Home," released in September 1996, reached the top ten on the US R&B/Hip-Hop Airplay chart and the New Zealand Singles Chart. Second single "I'll Be," released in March 1997, quickly became a major hit, peaking at number seven on the US Billboard Hot 100, marking the highest-charting single for both Foxy Brown and Jay-Z at the time. Two months later, it was certified gold by the Recording Industry Association of America (RIAA) for sales exceeding 500,000 copies. Third and final single, "Big Bad Mamma," was originally recorded with R&B group Dru Hill for the soundtrack of the 1997 film How to Be a Player before being included on the re-issue of Ill Na Na. Built around an interpolation of Carl Carlton's "She’s a Bad Mama Jama," the track became a moderate hit, peaking at number 53 on the Billboard Hot 100, her second-highest charting solo single.

== Critical reception ==
Professional ratings
Review scores
Source	Rating
AllMusic	4/5 stars
Entertainment Weekly	B+
Los Angeles Times	2/4 stars
Muzik	5/10
RapReviews	7/10
USA Today	2.5/4 stars
The Village Voice	(dud)

AllMusic editor Stephen Thomas Erlewine praised Ill Na Na for Brown's confident, sexy delivery, which makes her lyrics about fashion, sex, and the mafia compelling. He highlighted the sleek Trackmasters production and noted that, while guest appearances add star power, her charisma alone carries the album. Entertainment Weekly's Jim Farber found that "on Il Na Na, many of the beats are familiar [...] but Foxy Brown's seductive, confident presence almost makes it her own."

Writing for USA Today, Steve Jones concluded: "While she spends too much time on interludes about her crew, Brown rhymes smoothly on everything from raw sex to the glamorous life." Cheo Hodari Coker from The Los Angeles Times felt that "Brown occasionally displays dazzling skills. Unfortunately, many of her freestyles seem identical: repetitive, sound-alike rhymes about her doe eyes, homicidal tendencies and burning thighs. "Get Me Home" and the title track are the only songs on the album where it doesn't sound as if she's using a TelePrompTer."

== Commercial performance ==
In the United States, Ill Na Na debuted at number seven on the Billboard 200 and at number two on the Top R&B/Hip-Hop Albums chart, selling 128,000 copies in its first week, and was certified platinum by the Recording Industry Association of America (RIAA) within three months of its release. According to Nielsen SoundScan, the album has sold over 1,450,834 copies in the United States. In Canada, it was certified gold by the Canadian Recording Industry Association (CRIA). In the United Kingdom, it debuted at number 98 on the UK Albums Chart and was certified silver by the British Phonographic Industry (BPI). The album has also sold 8 million copies worldwide total to date.

== Track listing ==
Ill Na Na track listing
No.	Title	Writer(s)	Producer(s)	Length
1.	"Intro...Chicken Coop"	Richard Jackson; Isaac Hayes	Rich Nice	3:17
2.	"(Holy Matrimony) Letter to the Firm"	Inga Marchand; Samuel Barnes; Jean-Claude Olivier; Hayes	Trackmasters	3:26
3.	"Foxy's Bells"	Shawn Carter; Olivier; Barnes	Trackmasters	3:20
4.	"Get Me Home" (featuring Blackstreet)	Marchand; Olivier; Barnes; McKinley Horton; Ronald Broomfield	Trackmasters; Teddy Riley	3:49
5.	"The Promise" (featuring Havoc)	Marchand; Kejuan Muchita	Havoc	4:20
6.	"Interlude...The Set Up"	Jackson; Olivier; Barnes	Nice; George Pearson; Trackmasters	1:00
7.	"If I..."	Marchand; Carter; Olivier; Barnes; Luther Vandross; Marcus Miller	Trackmasters	3:42
8.	"The Chase"	Marchand; Olivier; Barnes	Trackmasters	3:18
9.	"Ill Na Na" (featuring Method Man)	Carter; Charles; Clifford Smith; Lionel Richie; Milan Williams; Thomas McClary; Walter Orange; Ronald LaPread; William King	Charly "Shuga Bear" Charles	3:06
10.	"No One's"	Marchand; Greg Cummins; James Harris III; Terry Lewis	China Black; Divine Allah	3:42
11.	"Fox Boogie" (featuring Kid Capri)	Marchand; Olivier; Barnes	Trackmasters	4:31
12.	"I'll Be" (featuring Jay-Z)	Carter; Olivier; Barnes; Bobby Watson; Bruce Swedien; Angela Winbush	Trackmasters	2:58
13.	"Outro"	Hayes; Jackson	Nice	0:42
Total length:				41:11

1997 European reissue
No.	Title	Writer(s)	Producer(s)	Length
14.	"Big Bad Mamma" (featuring Dru Hill)	Carter; Olivier; Barnes; Leon Haywood	Trackmasters	3:53
Total length:				45:04

Sample credits

- "Intro...Chicken Coop" contains a sample of "I Want to Make Love to You So Bad" performed by Isaac Hayes. Also contains interpolations of Just Another Case performed by Cru & "Dead Man Walking" by Cormega.
- "(Holy Matrimony) Letter to The Firm" contains samples of "Ike's Mood" performed by Isaac Hayes and "I Love You" by Mary J. Blige.
- "Foxy's Bells" contains a sample of "Rock the Bells" performed by LL Cool J.
- "Get Me Home" contains a sample of "Gotta Get You Home Tonight" performed by Eugene Wilde.
- "If I..." contains a sample of "Any Love" performed by Luther Vandross.
- "Ill Na Na" contains a sample of "Brick House" performed by Commodores.
- "No One's" contains a sample of "No One's Gonna Love You" performed by SOS Band.
- "I'll Be" contains a sample of "I'll Be Good" performed by René & Angela.
- "Outro" contains a sample of "I Want to Make Love to You So Bad" performed by Isaac Hayes.

Notes

- Some enhanced editions of the album include the music videos for "I'll Be" & "Get Me Home" as tracks fifteen and sixteen.

== Personnel ==
Adapted from the Ill Na Na liner notes.

- Executive Producers: Chris Lighty, Steve Stoute and Trackmasters
- A&R Direction: Chris Lighty and David Lighty
- Mastering: Tom Coyne
- Art Direction and Design: Drawing Board Design
- Photography: Michael Levine

== Charts ==
=== Weekly charts ===
Chart (1996–1997)	Peak position
Canada Top Albums/CDs (RPM)	41
Dutch Albums (Album Top 100)	80
German Albums (Offizielle Top 100)	27
UK Albums (Official Charts)	98
UK R&B Albums (Official Charts)	15
US Billboard 200	7
US Top R&B/Hip-Hop Albums (Billboard)	2

=== Year-end charts ===
Chart (1997)	Position
German Albums (Offizielle Top 100)	58
US Billboard 200	46
US Top R&B/Hip-Hop Albums (Billboard)	6

== Certifications and sales ==
Region	Certification	Certified units/sales
Canada (Music Canada)	Gold	50,000^{^}
United Kingdom (BPI)	Silver	60,000^{*}
United States (RIAA)	Platinum	2,500,000
^{*} Sales figures based on certification alone.^{^} Shipments figures based on certification alone.

== Release history ==
Ill Na Na release history
Region	Date	Format	Label	Ref(s)
United States	November 19, 1996	CD; Digital download; cassette	Violator; Def Jam	
United Kingdom	September 29, 1997	CD; Digital download; cassette	Violator; Def Jam	
