= Foxy Brown (rapper) =

American rapper and songwriter (born 1978)

- Brown in 2009

Background information
- Also known as: Fox Boogie; King Fox; AKA; Queen Nefertiti|Ill Na Na
- Born: Inga DeCarlo Fung Marchand; September 6, 1978 (age 48); Brooklyn, New York City, U.S.
- Genre: East Coast hip-hop
- Occupations: Rapper
- Works: Foxy Brown discography
- Years active: 1994–present
- Labels: Black Hand; Platinum Camp; Black Rose; Bad Boy; Koch; S. Carter; Rush; Def Jam; Violator
- Formerly of: The Firm
- Partners: Kurupt (1997–1999); Spragga Benz (2001–2003)
- Children: 1
- Relatives: DJ Clark Kent (cousin); Marcus Miller (cousin)

Inga DeCarlo Fung Marchand (born September 6, 1978), (Note: An arrest report by the Broward County Sheriff's Office dated February 16, 2007, listed her birth year as 1978. An article in The New York Times from September 8, 2007, stated: "Ms. Brown, who turned 29 on Thursday [September 6], had tried to conceal her identity by writing her name as Enga rather than Inga, and giving her date of birth as 1980 rather than 1978." The website AllMusic lists her birth date as September 6, 1979. An Entertainment Weekly article from March 9, 2001, appears to support the 1979 birth year. In her song "I Don't Need Nobody", Marchand raps "1978 / The year I was born".) known professionally as Foxy Brown, is a Trinidadian-American rapper. She signed to Def Jam Recordings and released her debut studio album Ill Na Na (1996) to critical and commercial success. The album peaked at number seven on the US Billboard 200, received platinum certification by the Recording Industry Association of America (RIAA), sold over seven million units worldwide, and was supported by the Billboard Hot 100 top ten single "I'll Be" (featuring Jay-Z).

In 1997, Brown formed the New York City-based hip hop group The Firm alongside rappers Nas, AZ and Cormega. The group released a self-titled album in 1997 which peaked atop the Billboard 200 but received a mixed reception. Brown followed this with her sophomore release, Chyna Doll (1999), which saw continued commercial success and debuted atop the Billboard 200, making her the second female rapper to do so. Her third studio album, Broken Silence (2001), peaked at number five on the same chart and earned a Grammy Award for Best Rap Solo Performance nomination for one of its songs.

Since parting ways with Def Jam, Brown has cancelled the majority of her releases including Ill Na Na 2: The Fever and Black Roses. Following years of legal issues and a lack of output, Brown released the mixtape Brooklyn's Don Diva (2008).

== Early life ==
Marchand is a Trinidadian-American of Dougla (mixed Afro-Trinidadian and Indo-Trinidadian and Chinese-Trinidadian descent). She was born in Brooklyn, and grew up in its neighborhood of Park Slope alongside her two older brothers. Her parents divorced when she was four, and her family moved in with her maternal grandfather. She later attended Brooklyn College Academy.

== Music career ==
=== 1994–1996: Early career ===
While still a teenager, Brown won a talent contest in the Park Slope neighborhood of Brooklyn, New York. Members of the production team Trackmasters who were working on LL Cool J's Mr. Smith album were in attendance that night and were impressed enough to invite Brown to rap on "I Shot Ya." She followed this debut with appearances on several RIAA platinum and gold singles from other artists, including remixes of songs "You're Makin' Me High" by Toni Braxton. Brown was featured on the soundtrack to the 1996 film The Nutty Professor on the songs "Touch Me, Tease Me" by Case and "Ain't No Nigga" by Jay-Z. She became an instant sensation due to being very talented and rapping provocatively at such a young age. The immediate success led to a label bidding war at the beginning of 1996, and in March, Def Jam Records won and added the then 17-year-old rapper to its roster.

=== 1996–1997: Ill Na Na and The Firm ===
In 1996, Brown released her debut album Ill Na Na to strong sales. The album sold over 128,000 copies in the first week, and debuted at No. 7 on the Billboard 200 album charts. The album was heavily produced by Trackmasters, and featured guest appearances from Jay-Z, Blackstreet, Method Man, and Kid Capri. The album was platinum and launched two hit singles: "Get Me Home" (featuring Blackstreet) and "I'll Be" (featuring Jay-Z).

Following the release of Ill Na Na, Brown joined fellow New York-based hip hop artists Nas, AZ, and Cormega (later replaced by Nature) to form the supergroup known as The Firm. The album was released via Aftermath Records and was produced and recorded by the collective team of Dr. Dre, the Trackmasters, and Steve "Commissioner" Stoute, then of Violator Entertainment. An early form of The Firm appeared on "Affirmative Action" from Nas' second album It Was Written. A remix of the song and several group freestyles were on the album Nas, Foxy Brown, AZ, and Nature Present The Firm: The Album. The album entered the Billboard 200 album chart at No. 1.

In March 1997, she joined the spring break festivities hosted by MTV in Panama City, Florida, with performers including rapper Snoop Dogg, pop group The Spice Girls, and rock band Stone Temple Pilots. Later, she joined the Smokin' Grooves tour hosted by the House of Blues with the headlining rap group Cypress Hill, along with other performers like Erykah Badu, The Roots, OutKast, and The Pharcyde, the tour set to begin in Boston, Massachusetts in the summer of 1997. However, after missing several dates in the tour, she left it.

=== 1998–2003: Chyna Doll and Broken Silence ===
Chyna Doll was released in January 1999 and debuted at No. 1 on the Billboard 200 Album chart, selling 173,000 copies in its opening week, making her the second female rapper to accomplish this feat after Lauryn Hill. However, its sales quickly declined in later weeks. Chyna Doll has been certified platinum after surpassing one million copies sold in shipments.

In 2001, Brown released Broken Silence. The first single from the album was "Oh Yeah", which featured her then-boyfriend, Jamaican dancehall artist Spragga Benz. The track "Na Na Be Like" was produced by Kenya Fame Flames Miller and Nokio from Dru Hill. The song "Candy", which featured guest vocals from Kelis, was never officially released as a single, but was hugely successful on the radio; it managed to chart at 48 on the R&B/Hip-Hop Singles & Track Chart and number 10 on the Rap charts". Na Na Be Like" was also on the Blue Streak Soundtrack. The album debuted on the Billboard Charts at No. 5, selling 130,000 units its first week. Like previous albums, Broken Silence also sold over 500,000 records and was certified gold by the RIAA.

In the same year, Brown recorded a song for the comedy film Rush Hour 2, Blow My Whistle, which is a collaboration with Japanese-American singer-songwriter Hikaru Utada, and was written by Utada with Pharrell Williams and Chad Hugo. The song is included on Def Jam's Rush Hour 2 Soundtrack, which peaked at the 11th spot on both the Billboard 200 and the Top R&B/Hip-Hop Albums and also the first on the Top Soundtracks. "Blow My Whistle" was produced by The Neptunes.

In 2002, Brown returned to the music scene with her single "Stylin'", whose remix featured rappers Birdman, her brother Gavin, Loon, and N.O.R.E. It was to be the first single from her upcoming album Ill Na Na 2: The Fever. The next year, she was featured on DJ Kayslay's single "Too Much for Me" from his Street Sweeper's Volume One Mixtape. She also appeared on Luther Vandross' final studio album Dance with My Father. That April, Brown appeared on popular New York radio DJ Wendy Williams' radio show, and revealed the details of her relationships with Lyor Cohen, president of Def Jam Recordings at the time, and Sean "P. Diddy" Combs. Brown accused both of illegally trading her recording masters. She also announced that Cohen had cancelled promotion for her fourth album Ill Na Na 2: The Fever over personal disagreements. Therefore, "Stylin'" was released on the compilation album The Source Presents: Hip Hop Hits Vol. 6.

=== 2004–2010: Scrapped albums and Black Roses ===
Upon leaving Def Jam Recordings after her disappointment in the cancelled promotion of her studio album Ill Na Na 2: The Fever, Brown began recording in late 2004. Months later, she reunited with Jay-Z, performing dates on the Best of Both Worlds Tour. After re-signing with Def Jam under his regime, Brown and Jay-Z began work on Black Roses with production by The Neptunes, Kanye West, Timbaland, Trackmasters, and Dave Kelly. Brown confirmed guest appearances by Barrington Levy, Dido, Luther Vandross, Mos Def, Baby Cham, Spragga Benz, Shyne, Big Daddy Kane, Rakim, KRS-One, Roxanne Shante, and Jay-Z, although it was uncertain whether all would make the final cut for the album.

In November 2004, Brown announced that the title for her upcoming album would be Black Roses, explaining "My best friend Barrington Levy has a song called 'Black Roses.' He's been traveling all over the world and never seen a black rose in no other garden. When he found his black rose, he knew that shit was special. Y'all niggas can have all the female rappers in the world, but there's only one black rose. I feel that's me." Brown also announced that she would be the first artist signed to Jay-Z's upcoming imprint record label S. Carter Records. Rather than launching the imprint, though, Jay-Z became the new president of Def Jam Records, where he signed Brown as one of the first artists on his new roster. In December 2005, Brown announced she had experienced severe and sudden hearing loss in both ears and she had not heard another person's voice in six months. Brown put Black Roses aside during this time. In June 2006, Brown said her hearing had been restored through surgery and she was planning to resume recording. Her label did not set a release date, but hoped the album would be out by the end of 2006. They were unsure if the title Black Roses would be kept. In November 2006, there was speculation that Jay-Z was disappointed in Foxy Brown's "lack of productivity on the album" and was planning to drop her from the Def Jam label. The planned December 2006 release of Black Roses was cancelled.

On May 22, 2007, Black Hand Entertainment announced a management deal with Brown, with Chaz Williams as her manager. No release date was set for Black Roses, but Brown said the album was nearly complete. Two days later, a release date of September 6 was announced. On August 14, Black Hand Entertainment announced that Brown would leave Def Jam to launch an independent record label, Black Rose Entertainment, distributed by Koch Records. The street album Brooklyn's Don Diva, was scheduled with a release date of December 4, but was delayed until the following year. After years of pushbacks and song leaks, Black Roses was ultimately cancelled. In October 2024, Foxy Brown announced she will work on an album called INGA to pay homage to her cousin DJ Clark Kent (who inspired the album name), further confirming she moved on from the Black Roses project.

Brooklyn's Don Diva was ultimately released as a street album on May 13, 2008, after many delays triggered by her prison sentence. It contains two previously unreleased songs from her shelved album Ill Na Na 2: The Fever. The album peaked at No. 83 on the Billboard 200 chart, No. 8 on the Independent Albums chart, and No. 5 on the Top R&B/Hip-Hop Albums chart.

=== 2011–present: Collaborations and current projects ===
In January 2011, Brown released the diss track "Massacre", a response to Lil' Kim's "Black Friday". On August 14, 2012, Foxy appeared as a special featured guest on Nicki Minaj's Pink Friday Tour in New York City. Rapper AZ later hinted in an interview that Brown was working on new material with Minaj. In August 2018, Brown made her first official guest appearance since 2009 on "Coco Chanel" from Nicki Minaj's fourth studio album Queen.

According to media sources, Brown is back to work on her upcoming fourth studio album. In 2019, Brown remixed Casanova's "So Brooklyn". A visual album, King Soon Come was also slated for release in 2019, but has since been delayed indefinitely.

In August 2020, Brown reunited with her group The Firm for the song "Full Circle" from Nas' album King's Disease.

== Other ventures ==
In 1998, Brown was featured in commercials for Mistic's "Living Delicious" sparkling water drink campaign. Hoping to take more control over her career during this time, she also launched her own label, Ill Na Na Entertainment, in a joint venture with Def Jam Recordings.

In 1999, in promotion of her album Chyna Doll, Brown collaborated with Avirex to produce exclusive merchandising, which was advertised in the liner notes of the Chyna Doll album and in the music video for Brown's song "I Can't". Following the rise of collaborations between hip hop artists and high fashion designers, Brown was named a spokeswoman for Calvin Klein and modeled in their jeans campaign. That year, she was also a muse to John Galliano for Dior.

In 2002, in promotion of both the show and her comeback single Stylin', Brown was featured in commercials for The Real World: Las Vegas.

In 2004, Brown launched "Champagne and Ice", her luxury fur collection distributed by Alexis & Gianni.

== Artistry ==
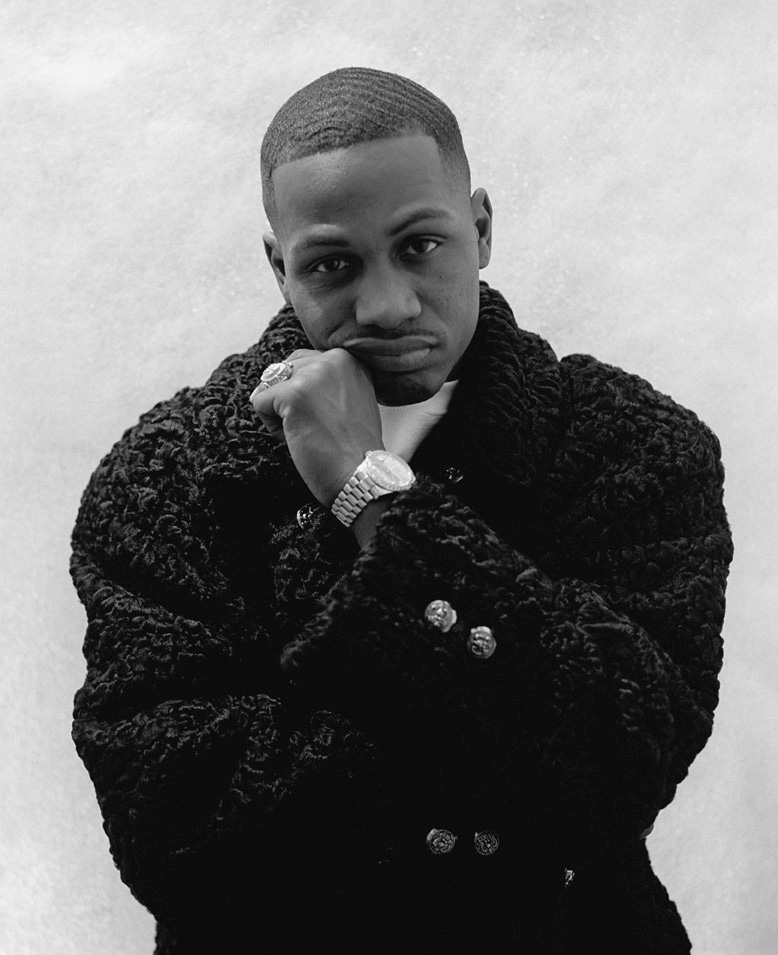
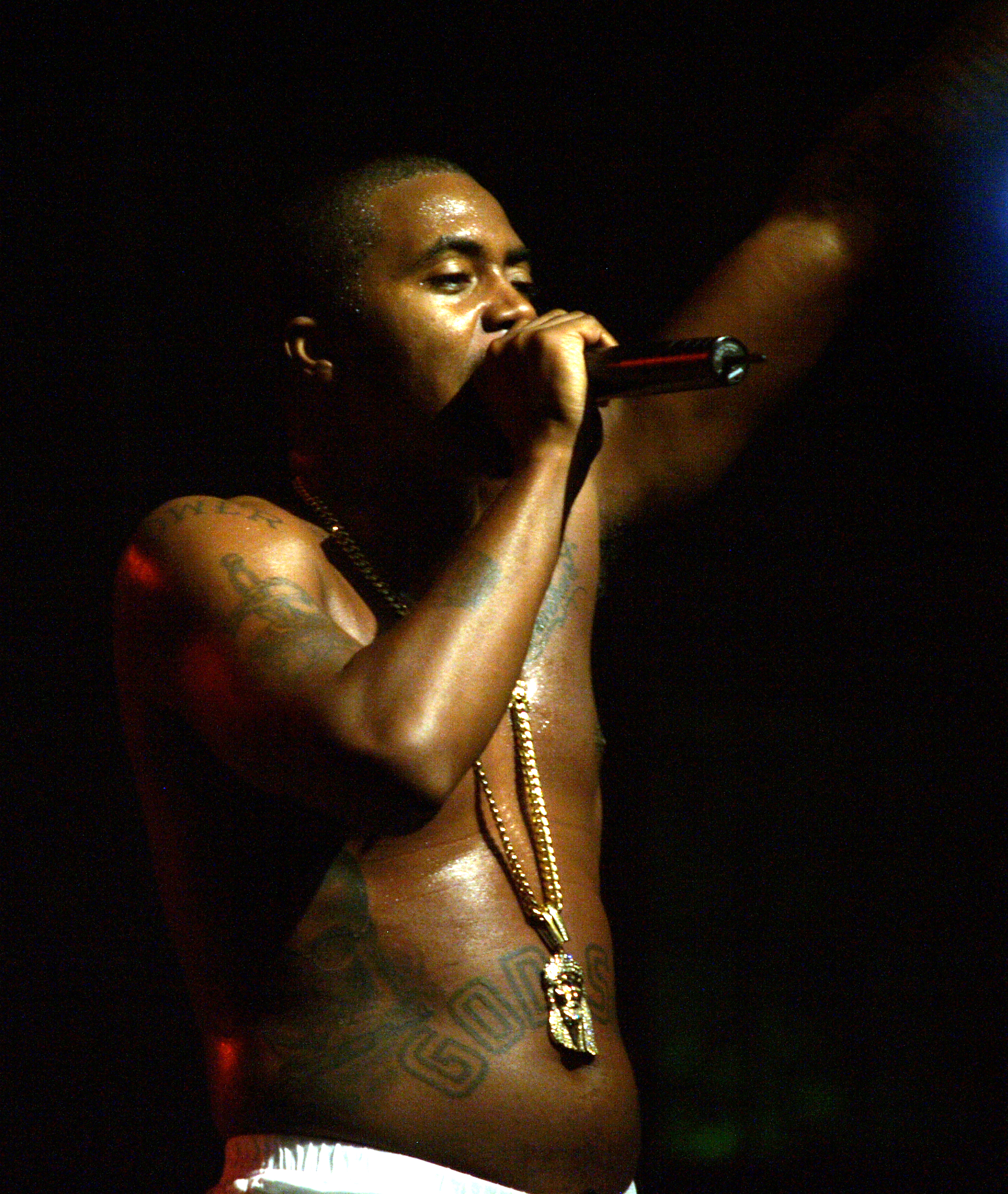
Rappers AZ (left) and Nas (right) have supported Brown; the latter being one of Brown's major influences.

=== Musical style ===
Brown's lyrics have been described to be "raunchy" and "over-the-top" with "skimpy clothes to match." Her music is often centred around themes such as "fashion, sex, and the mafia" and is described as "intriguingly seductive" and having "a contemporary edge with a sleek and sexy soundscape." Her work for her debut album was described as "a heroine straight from the pages of a James Bond novel," selling over a million copies with the support of major male artists such as Nas and AZ. Brown's voice has been described as a "husky flow" with "dancehall swagger".

Although her work was compared to rapper Lil' Kim, David Opie of Highsnobiety wrote:

Just because they were both the 'First Ladies' of their respective crews, doesn't mean that Foxy or Kim were identical by any means, and it was hugely misogynistic to suggest otherwise...In an industry that still actively mocks vulnerability and weakness, hip hop needs more rappers who are willing to open up in this way, and the fact that Foxy did so such a long time ago speaks volumes about her artistry.

== Legacy ==
Brown's impact on the rap world has often been overlooked due to her legal run-ins, but it has been noted that "she's bright, talented, sexy and, most important, she's not afraid to take risks creatively" and that her "impact still stands." Her albums have been cited to harness "a winning formula of looping R&B songs into hip-hop hits, resulting in the genre-shifting record," Ill Na Na. The release of her album marked a monumental moment in hip-hop history, but was downplayed due to comparisons between her and rapper Lil' Kim and although Foxy may not have achieved the "iconic status" Kim had reached, "her debut album was an essential part of a turning point in mainstream rap music." Rolling Stone author, Kathy Iandoli stated,

In seeing Foxy...release [Ill Na Na] it was a reassurance that skills paid off; it didn't really matter who was helping with the rhymes. It was the delivery and the content that was being said, and whose mouth it was coming out of. It was just a reassurance to me as a hip-hop head that this space might be opening up for women in a way that has never been done before. There was something about what [she] said and how [she was] saying it, that was hinting that a huge change was about to come.

Elle writer Janelle Harris wrote that Brown celebrated "the beauty of her mahogany skin as the self-professed 'dark-skinned Christian Dior poster girl,' boasted about being 'dripped in Gabbana...starring in billboards as big as the pride of the Black girls who saw themselves in her likeness."

Described as one of the "illest to ever do it – regardless of gender," Scott Glaysher of HipHopDX noted that "If those aforementioned male rappers epitomize the menacing New York City mobster of the late 90s then Foxy represents the mob wife that is even more sinister with weaponized sexuality." He stated that "the sheer confidence and astute rhyming Foxy brought to Ill Na Na, makes it one of the 90s most memorable albums and a catalyst for the fierce feminine rap wave that followed. In 2020, Spin ranked her at 20, as one of the 30 Best Female Rappers Ever.

Brown's sophomore studio album Chyna Doll debuted at number one in 1999, making it only the second female rap album to debut at the top spot after The Miseducation of Lauryn Hill in 1998 by Lauryn Hill. Her work has been paid homage to by numerous artists including Nicki Minaj, Kash Doll, Bia, Ivorian Doll, Megan Thee Stallion, JT of City Girls, Dreezy, and Maliibu Miitch. Minaj has even gone so far to say that without Foxy she "may have never even started rapping" and that she is "the most influential female rapper."

== Legal issues ==
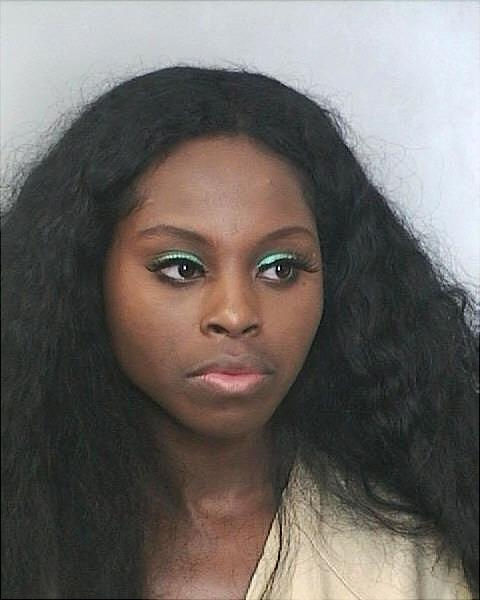
2007 mug shot

On September 7, 2007, New York City Criminal Court Judge Melissa Jackson sentenced Brown to one year in jail for violating her probation that stemmed from a fight in 2004 with two manicurists in a New York City nail salon. On September 12, representatives of the rapper disputed claims by her lawyer that she was pregnant. On October 23, 2007, Brown was given 76 days in solitary confinement due to a physical altercation that took place on October 3 with another prisoner. According to the prison authorities, Brown, the next day after the incident, was also verbally abusive toward correction officers and refused to take a random drug test. Prison authorities reported on November 27 that she was released "from solitary confinement...for good behavior", and Brown was finally released from prison on April 18, 2008.

On July 22, 2010, Brown was arrested and charged with one count of criminal contempt, which is a class E felony (the least severe), for violating an order of protection. The charge stems from an incident during the evening of July 21, 2010, in which it was claimed that Brown swore at, then mooned her neighbor Arlene Raymond, at whom she had thrown her BlackBerry, in 2007. Following the BlackBerry incident, Raymond sought and received a restraining order against Brown. Following her arrest, Brown appeared in court where she pleaded "not guilty" to the charge and was released on a $5,000 bail. If convicted, she faced up to seven years' imprisonment. On July 12, 2011, the charges were dropped.

== Personal life ==
From 1997 to 1999, she was engaged to fellow rapper Kurupt. In 2000, she announced that she was suffering from depression. She subsequently entered drug rehabilitation at Cornell University Medical College to receive treatment for opioid addiction, stating that she could no longer record or perform without resorting to morphine. Around 2001, she was engaged to Spragga Benz. Her uncle, Federico de la Asuncion, was one of 265 fatalities in the crash of American Airlines Flight 587 on November 12, 2001.

Brown suffered hearing loss from May 2005 to June 2006. She opted for a hearing aid, and while recording music, had someone tap beats on her shoulder.

In 2013, reports surfaced online claiming Brown had confessed to having a sexual relationship with Jay-Z and made disparaging remarks about him. In an interview with Combat Jack, Brown denied these reports, stating: "He never said not one bad thing about me. So when that false story came out about me talking about him, it's like, why would I say those things about him?"

On January 13, 2017, she gave birth to her first child, a girl.

== Discography ==
Studio albums

- Ill Na Na (1996)
- Chyna Doll (1999)
- Broken Silence (2001)
- Ill Na Na 2: The Fever (2003)
- Black Roses (2005)

Street albums

- Brooklyn's Don Diva (2008)

Collaborative albums

- The Album (with The Firm) (1997)

== Tours ==
=== Headlined ===
- Ill Na Na Tour (1997–1998)
- Chyna Doll Tour (1999–2000)
- Foxy Brown Tour (2002)

=== Co-headlined ===
- Smokin' Grooves Tour (1997)
- No Way Out Tour (1997)
- Get Up On A Room (1999)
- Out4Fame Germany Tour (2015)

=== Appearances ===
- Reasonable Doubt Tour (1996)
- Survival of the Illest Tour (1998)
- The Black Album Tour (2003)
- Best of Both Worlds Tour (2004)
- Pink Friday Tour (2012)

== Filmography ==
=== Films ===
Year	Title	Role
1998	Woo	Fiancée
2004	Fade to Black	Herself

== Awards and nominations ==
Award	Year (Note: Indicates the year of ceremony. Each year is linked to the article about the awards held that year, wherever possible.)	Category	Recipient(s) and nominee(s)	Result	Ref.
Billboard Music Awards	1997	Billboard Music Award for Top Rap Song	"I'll Be"	Nominated	
Ascap Awards	1997	Rhythm & Soul Music Award	"Touch Me, Tease Me"	Won	
Echo Awards	1998	Best International Newcomer	"Ill Na Na"	Nominated	
Echo Awards	1998	Best International Rock/Pop Female Artist	"Get Me Home"	Nominated	
Soul Train Lady of Soul	1998	Best R&B/Soul or Rap Music Video	"Big Bad Mamma"	Nominated	
Soul Train Lady of Soul	1999	Best R&B/Soul or Rap Music Video	"Hot Spot"	Nominated	
MTV Video Music Awards	2000	Best Video from a Film	"Thong Song (Remix)"	Nominated	
BET Awards	2002	Best Female Hip-Hop Artist	Herself	Nominated	
Grammy Awards	2003	Best Rap Solo Performance	"Na Na Be Like"	Nominated	
BDS Certified Spin Awards	2005	BDS Certified 50,000 Spins	"U Already Know"	Won	
Ascap Awards	2011	Rhythm & Soul Music Award	"Hold You Down (Goin In Circles)."	Won	
Culture Queens	2019	Hip Hop Icon	Herself	Won	
