= Amerie discography =

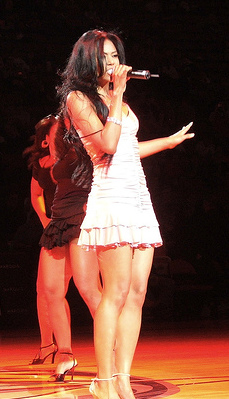
- Amerie performing in November 2007
- Studio albums: 4
- Extended plays: 3
- Compilation albums: 2
- Singles: 24
- Mixtapes: 1

American singer Amerie has released four studio albums, two compilation albums, one mixtape, three extended plays, and twenty-four singles. Her debut album, All I Have (2002), was certified Gold in the United States, and produced the top forty song "Why Don't We Fall in Love". Amerie's 2005 single "1 Thing"—from her second album, Touch became her biggest hit in the US and elsewhere, although US sales of Touch did not match those of her debut. Her third album, Because I Love It (2007), was preceded by the single "Take Control" and the mixtape Because I Love It Vol. 1, and it remains unreleased in North America. Amerie's recordings outside her solo material include featured credits on singles by Nas, LL Cool J, DJ Kayslay, Ricky Martin and Chingy.

Amerie's fourth album In Love & War debuted at number #46 on the US Billboard 200 chart, selling 12,500 copies in its first week. Three singles were released in promotion of the album, including "Why R U" on June 15, 2009, "Heard 'Em All" on September 15, 2009, and "Pretty Brown" on October 20, 2009. Def Jam released a six-track album sampler containing snippets of "Higher", "Tell Me You Love Me", "Pretty Brown", and "Red Eye", as well full versions of "Heard 'Em All" and "Why R U", which had been remastered. Amerie performed "Heard 'Em All" and "Higher" in November 2009 on Jimmy Kimmel Live!. A music video for "More Than Love" featuring Fabolous, directed by Taj was released in January 2010.

Between 2016 and 2018, Amerie released three EPs under her own label, Feeniix Rising. In 2025, she released the single "Mine", through a new independent outfit, Amerie Inc., which is expected to be from her forthcoming sixth studio album.

== Albums ==
=== Studio albums ===
List of studio albums, with selected chart positions and certifications
Title	Details	Peak chart positions										Certifications
Title	Details	US	US R&B	AUS	FRA	GER	IRE	JPN	NLD	SWI	UK	Certifications
All I Have	Released: July 30, 2002; Label: Columbia; Formats: CD, digital download	9	2	—	—	—	—	181	—	—	—	RIAA: Gold
Touch	Released: April 26, 2005; Label: Sony Urban Music, Columbia; Formats: CD, digital download	5	3	57	59	91	—	13	70	83	28	RIAA: Gold; BPI: Gold
Because I Love It	Released: May 11, 2007; Label: Columbia; Formats: CD, digital download	—	—	—	159	—	65	13	—	42	17	BPI: Silver
In Love & War	Released: November 3, 2009; Label: Def Jam; Formats: CD, digital download	46	3	—	—	—	—	89	—	—	—	
"—" denotes a recording that did not chart or was not released in that territory.

=== Compilation albums ===
Title	Details
Playlist: The Very Best of Amerie	Released: October 21, 2008; Label: Columbia; Format: CD
Best 15 Things	Released: March 18, 2009 (Japan); Label: Columbia; Format: CD

=== Box sets ===
Title	Details
3 Original Album Classics	Released: January 25, 2010 (Europe); Label: Columbia; Formats: 3×CD

=== Mixtapes ===
- 2006: Because I Love It Vol. 1

== Extended plays ==
Title	Details
Drive	Released: May 20, 2016; Label: Feeniix Rising; Formats: Streaming, digital download
4AM Mulholland	Released: October 19, 2018; Label: Feeniix Rising; Formats: Streaming, digital download
After 4AM	Released: October 19, 2018; Label: Feeniix Rising; Formats: Streaming, digital download

== Singles ==
=== As lead artist ===
List of singles as lead artist, with selected chart positions and certifications, showing year released and album name
Title	Year	Peak chart positions										Certifications	Album
Title	Year	US	US R&B	AUS	FIN	FRA	GER	IRE	NLD	SWI	UK	Certifications	Album
"Why Don't We Fall in Love"	2002	23	9	73	—	—	—	—	—	—	40		All I Have
"Talkin' to Me"	2002	51	18	—	—	—	—	—	—	—	—		All I Have
"I'm Coming Out"	2003	—	—	66	—	—	—	—	69	—	—		Maid in Manhattan: Music from the Motion Picture
"1 Thing"	2005	8	1	13	5	35	34	6	12	28	4	RIAA: Gold; BPI: Platinum	Touch
"Touch"	2005	—	95	33	—	—	—	8	50	43	19		Touch
"Talkin' About"	2005	—	— (Note: "Talkin' About" did not enter the Hot R&B/Hip-Hop Songs chart, but peaked at number two on the Bubbling Under R&B/Hip-Hop Singles chart.)	—	—	—	—	—	—	—	—		Touch
"Take Control"	2006	—	66	—	9	52	64	23	—	67	10		Because I Love It
"Gotta Work"	2007	—	—	—	—	—	— (Note: "Gotta Work" did not enter the German Singles Chart Top 100 but peaked at number 6 on the German Deutsche Black Charts.)	30	—	—	21		Because I Love It
"Why R U"	2009	—	55	—	—	—	— (Note: "Why R U" did not enter the German Singles Chart Top 100, but peaked at number 13 on the German Deutsche Black Charts.)	—	—	—	—		In Love & War
"Heard 'em All" (featuring Lil Wayne)	2009	—	81	—	—	—	— (Note: "Heard 'em All" did not enter the German Singles Chart Top 100, but peaked at number 35 on the German Deutsche Black Charts.)	—	—	—	—		In Love & War
"Pretty Brown" (featuring Trey Songz)	2009	—	78	—	—	—	—	—	—	—	—		In Love & War
"What I Want"	2014	—	—	—	—	—	—	—	—	—	—		Non-album single
"Out Loud"	2015	—	—	—	—	—	—	—	—	—	—		Drive
"Redrum"	2017	—	—	—	—	—	—	—	—	—	—		Non-album single
"Curious"	2019	—	—	—	—	—	—	—	—	—	—		4AM Mulholland
"A Heart's for the Breaking"	2019	—	—	—	—	—	—	—	—	—	—		4AM Mulholland
"Mine"	2025	—	—	—	—	—	—	—	—	—	—		TBA
"—" denotes a recording that did not chart or was not released in that territory.

=== As featured artist ===
List of singles as featured artist, with selected chart positions, showing year released and album name
Title	Year	Peak chart positions										Album
Title	Year	US	US R&B	AUS	FRA	GER	ITA	IRE	NLD	SWI	UK	Album
"Rule" (Nas featuring Amerie)	2001	—	67	—	—	—	—	—	—	—	—	Stillmatic and Like Mike soundtrack
"Paradise" (LL Cool J featuring Amerie)	2003	36	14	28	—	—	41	48	—	70	18	10 and Deliver Us from Eva soundtrack
"Too Much for Me" (DJ Kayslay featuring Nas, Foxy Brown, Birdman and Amerie)	2003	—	53	—	—	—	—	—	—	—	—	The Streetsweeper Vol. 1
"I Don't Care" (Ricky Martin featuring Fat Joe and Amerie)	2005	65	—	25	16	21	6	20	20	20	11	Life
"Fly Like Me" (Chingy featuring Amerie)	2007	89	40	—	—	—	—	—	—	—	—	Hate It or Love It
"Guardian Angel" (Lil' Eddie featuring Amerie)	2011	—	—	—	—	—	—	—	—	—	—	Already Yours
"Blood Stain 2" (Consequence featuring Amerie and Rick Ross)	2023	—	—	—	—	—	—	—	—	—	—	Non-album single
"—" denotes a recording that did not chart or was not released in that territory.

== Guest appearances ==
List of non-single guest appearances, with other performing artists, showing year released and album name
Title	Year	Other artist(s)	Album
"Rule"	2001	Nas	Stillmatic
"Life"	2002	Royce da 5'9"	Rock City
"Think of You"	2003	Various Artists	Honey (soundtrack)
"To My Mama"	2003	Bow Wow	Unleashed
"Rest of My Life"	2004	Nas	Street's Disciple
"Dog Love"	2006	DMX, Janyce	Year of the Dog... Again
"Get Your Number"	2008	Yung Berg	Look What You Made Me
"Give It to You"	2012	Ron Browz	Fly Away
"Fly Away"	2012	Jean-Roch, Fat Joe	Music Saved My Life

== Music videos ==
Title	Year	Director
"Why Don't We Fall in Love"	2002	Benny Boom
"Talkin' to Me"	2002	Dave Meyers
"Paradise" (LL Cool J featuring Amerie)	2002	Benny Boom
"Too Much for Me" (DJ Kayslay featuring Nas, Foxy Brown, Birdman and Amerie)	2003	
"I'm Coming Out"	2003	
"Welcome Back" (Mase)	2004	Chris Robinson
"1 Thing"	2005	Chris Robinson and Amerie
"1 Thing (Remix)" (featuring Eve)	2005	Chris Robinson
"Protège-toi" (as part of Collectif Protection Rapprochée)	2005	
"Touch"	2005	Chris Robinson
"I Don't Care" (Ricky Martin featuring Fat Joe and Amerie)	2005	Diane Martel
"Take Control"	2006	Scott Franklin
"Gotta Work"	2007	Scott Franklin
"Fly Like Me" (Chingy featuring Amerie)	2007	Jessy Terrero
"Why R U"	2009	Ray Kay
"Everything, Everyday, Everywhere" (Fabolous featuring Keri Hilson)	2009	Erik White
"Heard 'Em All" (featuring Lil Wayne)	2009	Anthony Mandler
"More Than Love" (featuring Fabolous)	2009	Taj
"Curious"	2019	Carlos Torres
"1 Thing Freestyle" (Fabolous)	2022	Abeni Nazeer
