= Best 15 Things =

Compilation album by Amerie
- Released: March 18, 2009
- Recorded: 2001–2007
- Studio: Chalice Recording Studios (Hollywood, Los Angeles, California); Cue Recording Studios (Falls Church, Virginia); Lobo Recording Studios (Deer Park, New York); Night Flight Recording Studios (Fort Washington, Maryland); Sony Music Studios; The Hit Factory (New York City, New York); Wonderland Studios (Jersey City, New Jersey)
- Genre: R&B; soul; hip hop
- Length: 52:34
- Label: Columbia
- Producer: Amerie; Lenny Nicholson; Rich Harrison; Lil Jon; Mike Caren; One Up; Cory Rooney; Loren Dawson

Amerie chronology
Because I Love It (2007)	Best 15 Things (2009)	In Love & War (2009)

Best 15 Things (stylized as Best 15 things) is the second compilation album by American singer Amerie. It was released only in selected Asian countries on March 18, 2009 by Columbia. It contained material from her first three studio albums: All I Have (2002), Touch (2005) and Because I Love It (2007).

== Track listing ==
No.	Title	Writer(s)	Producer(s)	Length
1.	"1 Thing" (from Touch)	Amerie Mi Marie Rogers; Rich Harrison; Stanley Walden	Harrison	4:01
2.	"Gotta Work" (from Because I Love It)	Rogers; Isaac Hayes; David Porter; Loren Hill; Rich Shelton; Kevin Veney	One Up	3:10
3.	"Take Control" (from Because I Love It)	Rogers; Daryl Hall; John Oates; Sara Allen; Thomas Callaway; Mike Caren; Tom Zé; Waldez	Caren	3:42
4.	"Talkin' About" (from Touch)	Rogers; Harrison	Harrison	4:19
5.	"Why Don't We Fall in Love" (from All I Have)	Harrison	Harrison	2:39
6.	"Rolling Down My Face" (from Touch)	Rogers; Harrison; Roy Ayers	Harrison	3:34
7.	"Talkin' to Me" (from All I Have)	Harrison	Harrison	3:54
8.	"Some Like It" (from Because I Love It)	Rogers; Malcolm McLaren; Anne Dudley; Lenvert Nicholson	Lenny Nicholson	2:56
9.	"Touch" (from Touch)	Rogers; Sean Garrett; James Phillips; Jonathan Smith; Craig Love; LaMarquis Jefferson	Lil Jon	3:38
10.	"Can't Let Go" (from All I Have)	Harrison	Harrison	4:21
11.	"All I Have" (from All I Have)	Harrison	Harrison	4:08
12.	"I'm Coming Out" (from Touch)	Bernard Edwards; Nile Rodgers	Cory Rooney; Loren Dawson	3:31
13.	"Why Don't We Fall in Love" (featuring Ludacris) (from All I Have)	Harrison	Harrison	3:30
14.	"Take Control" (Old Nick Mix) (from Because I Love It)	Rogers; Hall; Oates; Allen; Callaway; Caren; Zé; Waldez	Caren	3:43
15.	"1 Thing" (featuring Eve) (from Touch)	Rogers; Harrison; Eve Jeffers; Walden	Harrison	4:18
Total length:				52:34

Sample credits

- "Why Don't We Fall in Love" contains a sample of "Condor! (Theme)/I Got You Where I Want You", as performed by Dave Grusin from the soundtrack to the 1975 film Three Days of the Condor and excerpts from The Ebons' "You're the Reason Why", written by Kenneth Gamble and Leon Huff.
- "1 Thing" contains excerpts from The Meters' "Oh! Calcutta!", written by Stanley Walden.
- "Rolling Down My Face" contains an interpolation of Roy Ayers' "Searching", written by Ayers.
- "I'm Coming Out" is a cover of the track of the same title by Diana Ross.
- "Some Like It" contains a sample of "World's Famous" by Malcolm McLaren.
- "Take Control" contains a sample of "Jimi Renda-Se" by Tom Zé and "You Make My Dreams" by Hall & Oates.
- "Gotta Work" contains a sample of "Hold on I'm Coming" by Mighty Dog Haynes.

== Release history ==
Region	Date	Format	Label	Catalog	Ref.
Japan	March 18, 2009	CD	Columbia	SICP 2178	
