= Daniel Richards =

Daniel Richards may refer to:

- Daniel H. Richards (1808–1877), American politician and newspaper editor
- Daniel "2Dark" Richards (born 1983), British record producer
- Danny Richards, big band vocalist in the 1930s and 1940s
- Daniel Richards (bishop), American Episcopalian bishop
- Daniel Richards (wrestler) (born 1979), American professional wrestler billed as the "Progressive Liberal"
