= Midnight Rain (disambiguation) =

"Midnight Rain" is a song by Taylor Swift from the 2022 album Midnights.

Midnight Rain may also refer to:

- "Midnight Rain", a song by Vinnie Moore from the 1991 album Meltdown
- "Midnight Rain", a song by Paul Kelly from the 2001 album ...Nothing but a Dream
- "Midnight Rain", a song by Amerie from the 2018 EP After 4AM
- Midnight Rain, a 2004 novel by Holly Lisle
