= The Buchanans =

American songwriting and record production team

The Buchanans are an American production team, founded by Wiz Buchanan (a.k.a. Jesús Mi Amor) and Dre Vega. Along with later members Kyle "Keyz" Davidson, and Chris Paultre, the Buchanans are also rappers and songwriters.

== Life and career ==
Wiz and Dre are two childhood friends that grew up in the Coney Island section of Brooklyn, New York. Throughout grade school the two completely immersed themselves in hip hop culture, participating in everything from breakdancing, graffiti, to rap. It was not until they duo reached their late teens that they decided to take their musical talents serious. As they explain, "some of our friends started recording songs and making tracks, and it took our interest in music to another level. We decided to pool our money together and purchase recording equipment so we could cut records to the raps we had in our heads. That led to making beats, which broadened our horizons even more." Finding inspiration in Dr. Dre's The Chronic, the duo immediately began crafting their sound. One of their first creations was a track called "What More Can I Say", which found its way on Jay-Z's The Black Album. From there, The Buchanans went on to produce for artists such as Beyoncé, Nas, Dr. Dre, T.I, Lupe Fiasco, Amerie and Fabolous. In 2012, The Buchanans released God Is In The Machine, a mixtape project that features founding member Wiz Buchanan as Jesús Mi Amor.

== Production style ==
The Buchanans mainly produce songs in the hip hop and R&B genres. Their sound is heavily inspired by 1970s soul music and hip hop from the 1980s and 1990s.

== Discography ==
Year	Title	Artist	Album
2003	"What More Can I Say"	Jay-Z	The Black Album
2003	"Horndog"	Overseer	Mitsubishi Endeavor Commercial
2004	"Hip Hop Star"	Beyoncé feat. Outkast	Dangerously in Love
2004	"Spaze Out" "Fast Money" "Cold Blooded" "Lean" "GameTime"	Lupe Fiasco	Lupe Fiasco's Food & Liquor (Unreleased)
2004	"Hustle On"	Smitty	Smitty
2004	"Doomsday" "Horndog"	Overseer	Need For Speed; Walking Tall Movie Trailer
2005	"Not the Only One" "Man Up" "Star in da Hood" "Its okay" "So Long" (Chris Paultre)	Amerie Amerie feat. Nas; Black Rob; Mashonda; Cassidy	Touch; The Black Rob Report; January Joy; I'm A Hustla
2006	"Intro" "Outro	Lupe Fiasco	Lupe Fiasco's Food & Liquor (Chris Paultre)
2006	"Step Up" (Movie) (Chris Paultre)		
2007	"Down For You"	Unique	N/A
2007	"The Coolest" "Gold Watch" "Streets on Fire"	Lupe Fiasco	Lupe Fiasco's The Cool (Chris Paultre)
2007-2008	"Forecast (Intro)"(Chris Paultre) "Crush" "Crazy Wonderful" "Make Me Believe" "Thats What U R" (Chris Paultre) "Streets Alone" (Chris Paultre)	Amerie	Because I Love It
2007-2008	"Horndog"	Overseer	Phoenix Suns Introduction Video
2009	"Why R U" "More Than Love"	Amerie; Amerie feat. Fabolous	In Love & War
2009	"Losing It"	K. Michelle	N/A
2010	"Dr. Pepper Commercial" "Shit Popped Off" "Fire" "Loving What You Do, Snatch You Up"	Dr. Dre; Dr. Dre feat. T.I; Lupe Fiasco; Nicoya Polar	N/A
2010	"+-" "Double Trouble"	Fabri Fibra	Controcultura
2011	"All Black Everything"	Lupe Fiasco	Lasers
2012	"F.U.C.K You"	Sarah Green	TBA
2012	BET Presidential Campaign (Chris Paultre)		
2015	"Mural"	Lupe Fiasco	Tetsuo & Youth
2016	"Thru the Stars" "Sing About It" "Take the Blame"	Ameriie	Drive
