= Darlan (footballer, born 1994) =

Brazilian footballer

Personal information
- Full name: Darlan Bispo Damasceno
- Date of birth: 21 July 1994 (age 32)
- Place of birth: Irará, Brazil
- Height: 1.75 m (5 ft 9 in)
- Position: Midfielder

Team information
- Current team: Louletano
- Number: 5

Youth career
- 2008: Vitória
- 2009: Fluminense
- 2009: Vasco da Gama
- 2010: Paraná
- 2011–2014: Vitória

Senior career*
Years	Team	Apps	(Gls)
2014–2017	Vitória	0	(0)
2014–2015	→ Real Sociedad B (loan)	26	(0)
2015–2016	→ Getafe B (loan)	22	(1)
2017	→ Náutico (loan)	12	(0)
2019	Mirassol	0	(0)
2019	→ Veranópolis (loan)	0	(0)
2019–	Louletano	6	(0)
- * Club domestic league appearances and goals as of 20:48, 24 May 2019 (UTC)

Darlan Bispo Damasceno (born 21 July 1994), simply known as Darlan, is a Brazilian footballer who plays as a defensive midfielder for Louletano.

== Club career ==
Born in Irará, Bahia, Darlan was promoted to Vitória's first team in 2014. On 25 July of that year he was loaned to Real Sociedad B for six months, and made his senior debut on 23 August by starting in a 3–3 home draw against UB Conquense in the Segunda División B championship.

On 3 July 2015, after featuring regularly, Darlan was loaned to fellow third-tier club Getafe CF B. He scored his first senior goal on 19 December, netting the first in a 4–0 away routing of UD Socuéllamos, but suffered team relegation at the end of the season.

On 18 January 2017 Darlan moved to Náutico on loan until the end of the year. He made his Série B debut on 13 May, starting in a 0–0 home draw against América Mineiro.
