= Brazil Classics, Vol. 5: The Hips of Tradition =

Studio album by Tom Zé
- Released: 1992
- Genre: MPB
- Length: 40:11
- Label: Luaka Bop
- Producer: Roberto Lazzarine, Arto Lindsay

Professional ratings
Review scores
Source	Rating
AllMusic	4.5/5 stars
Robert Christgau	A

Brazil Classics, Vol. 5: The Hips of Tradition is a studio album by the Brazilian musician Tom Zé. It is Zé's first studio album on Luaka Bop and is the 1992 follow-up to his compilation released on the same label, Brazil Classics, Vol 4. "Jingle do Disco" features David Byrne on vocals.

== Track listing ==
1. "Ogodô, Ano 2000" – 3:57
2. "Sem a Letra “A”" – 3:00
3. "Feira de Santana" – 2:53
4. "Sofro de Juventude" – 3:15
5. "Cortina 1” – 1:06
6. "Taí" – 1:05
7. "Iracema" – 1:44
8. "Fliperama” – 3:04
9. "O Amor é Velho-Menina” – 3:08
10. "Cortina 2" – 0:25
11. "Tatuarambá" – 2:58
12. "Jingle do Disco" – 1:06
13. "Lua-Gira-Sol" – 2:32
14. "Cortina 3" – 1:04
15. "Multiplicar-se Única" – 1:45
16. "Cortina 4" – 0:44
17. "O Pão Nosso de Cada Mês" – 2:45
18. “Amar” – 3:16
