= Postmodern Platos =

Studio album by Tom Zé
- Released: 1999
- Label: Luaka Bop

Tom Zé chronology
Com Defeito de Fabricação (1998)	Postmodern Platos (1999)	20 Preferidas (1999)

Postmodern Platos is an EP by the Brazilian musician Tom Zé, released in 1999. It contains remixes of tracks found on his album Com Defeito de Fabricação. The album and the EP helped to increase Zé's popularity in the United States and Brazil.

Zé supported the EP by touring North America (for the first time) with Tortoise; Zé sold the EP at his concerts and online. The remix EP conforms to Zé's philosophy of arrastão, where art can be "stolen" and repurposed.

== Production ==
The tracks were remixed by the High Llamas, John McEntire, Sean Lennon, Amon Tobin, and Sasha-Frere Jones (as Gene to Gene). Zé was surprised that his music was so appreciated by artists working in various genres; he also was pleased that some songs sped up his rhythms. "Canudos" was a new song by Zé.

== Critical reception ==
Professional ratings
Review scores
Source	Rating
The Encyclopedia of Popular Music	2/5 stars
Orange County Register	3/5 stars
Pitchfork	6.7/10
Rolling Stone	3/5 stars

Pitchfork wrote: "When, four minutes into the almost seven- minute-long nebulaic journey, Tobin breaks out his trademark frenzied rhythmic assault, he casually casts off the best one-and-a-half minutes Postmodern Platos has to offer." Spin determined that "rarely has weird alien funkaplinking been so relaxing." The Star Tribune noted that the remixers "breathe their own musicality into Ze's songs." The Orange County Register labeled the EP "little more than an appetizer for his full-length CD—but it's tasty nonetheless."

The Los Angeles Times deemed the EP "a kind of '90s pop music echo of the eclectic, cut-and-paste avant-garde music of the '60s, an early influence on Ze during his student days." The Village Voice concluded that "McEntire's 'Defect 2: Curiosidade' remix ... doesn't demonstrate particular insight." Rolling Stone wrote that "the High Llamas dismantle [Zé's] song into free-floating radio transmissions that murmur above a plaintive, warbling synthesizer."

== Track listing ==
No.	Title	Length
1.	"Defect 2: Curiosidade (High Llamas Remix)"
2.	"Defect 2: Curiosidade (John McEntire Remix)"
3.	"Defect 5: O Olho Do Lago (Sean Lennon Remix)"
4.	"Defect 2: Curiosidade (Amon Tobin Remix)"
5.	"Defect 1: Gene (Gene to Gene Remix)"
6.	"Canudos"
