= The Center (TV series) =

2003 American TV series

- Presented by: Julissa Bermudez
- Country of origin: United States

Production
- Running time: approx. 60 mins

Original release
- Network: BET
- Release: March 3, 2003 – January 25, 2007

The Center is an afternoon music program that aired on BET. It debuted on March 3, 2003, replacing Hits from the Street. The program focused on music, entertainment and lifestyle.

The program was originally hosted by R&B singer Amerie, but in September 2003 she left to work on her new music. On March 8, 2004, Tiffany Withers, host of BET.com Countdown, left that program and became the new host of The Center. She would host the program until November 5, 2004, when Julissa Bermudez took over. Occasionally, special guests, such as R&B/hip-hop artists, would host the program.

The last show aired on January 25, 2007.
