= Daniel "2Dark" Richards =

Daniel 2Dark
- Also known as: Daniel 2Dark, D2D, TrackNova
- Born: 1983 (age 42–43)
- Origin: Birmingham, England
- Genres: Hip-hop, R'n'B, synthpop, pop, UKG
- Occupation: Producer
- Years active: 2002-present

Daniel "2Dark" Richards (born 1983) is a British record producer from Birmingham, England. At 18, whilst attending the Urban Music Seminar (UMS) in Birmingham, Daniel met UMS founder, and offered him his demo CD. He was awarded £10,000 prize money in the 2006 Urban Music Awards. He was then chosen for a nationwide TV and cinema ad campaign for the drinks company Vodka Reef. Richards moved to London and won the commission for the music for London’s bid for the 2012 Summer Olympics through one of the world's largest advertising firms M&C Saatchi. In 2012, he worked with an array of international production teams and artists, namely Beluga Heights, with a joint production with JR Rotem, set to make Sean Kingston's album, Back 2 Life. In 2014, D2D released his new single "Sweet Lovin', Happiness & Joy" which featured Amy Pearson.

== Remix credits ==
- Laura Izibor - "Don't Stay" (2009)
- Amerie - "Heard Em All" (Dance Remix) (2010)
- N-Dubz - "Took It All Away" (2010)

== Production credits ==
- Caron Wheeler (2002) - "Still Running"
- Christian Blaizer ft Erick Sermon & Redman (2005) - "All I Want"
- Amerie - In Love & War (2009) - 13. Dear John (Produced with Sean Rumsey)
- Tinie Tempah - "In Love Again" (Unreleased)
- Tinie Tempah - "My Girl" ft Daniel de Bourg (Unreleased)
- DJ Ironik - Ironik ft Skepta and Scorcher - "Slow Down"
- DJ Ironik - Ironik - "Falling in Love" ft Jessica Lowndes (Co-Production)
- Wiley (rapper) - "Paper" (co-wrote)
- Master Shortie - "Down To the River"
- Jamelia - Rebel - "Alive"
- EJ - "Story" (Epic)
- Dutty Menace - "She Wanna Roll"
- Mike Hough - "Nothing to Lose"
- Mike Hough - "Stars"
- Sean Kingston - Back 2 Life - "TBA" (Co-Production)
- D2D ft Amy Pearson - "Sweet Lovin', Happiness & Joy"
