= Brazil Classics, Vol. 4: The Best of Tom Zé – Massive Hits =

Brazil Classics, Vol. 4: The Best of Tom Zé

Compilation album by Tom Zé
- Released: 1990
- Genres: Tropicalia; avant-pop; art pop
- Length: 42:36
- Label: Luaka Bop (United States)

Professional ratings
Review scores
Source	Rating
AllMusic	4.5/5 stars
CMJ	(very favorable) link
Robert Christgau	A+ link

Brazil Classics, Vol. 4: The Best of Tom Zé – Massive Hits is a compilation album by Brazilian singer-songwriter Tom Zé. This 1990 album was Tom Zé's first release on Luaka Bop after being discovered by David Byrne and was the first introduction of Zé's music to a wider U.S. audience. Music critic Robert Christgau has named it among his 10 best albums from the 1990s.

== Track listing ==
No.	Title	Original album	Length
1.	"Mã"	Estudando o Samba	3:53
2.	"O Riso E A Faca"	Todos os Olhos	2:41
3.	"Toc"	Estudando o Samba	2:59
4.	"Tô"	Estudando o Samba	2:46
5.	"Um Oh! E Um Ah!"	Todos os Olhos	0:59
6.	"Ui! (Você Inventa)"	Estudando o Samba	3:01
7.	"Cademar"	Todos os Olhos	0:45
8.	"Só (Solidão)"	Estudando o Samba	4:29
9.	"Hein?"	Estudando o Samba	3:32
10.	"Augusta, Angélica, E Consolação"	Todos os Olhos	3:43
11.	"Dói"	Estudando o Samba	3:23
12.	"Complexo de Épico"	Todos os Olhos	1:17
13.	"A Felicidade"	Estudando o Samba	3:19
14.	"Vai (Menina Amanhã de Manhã)"	Estudando o Samba	2:22
15.	"Nave Maria"	Nave Maria	3:25
