= Com Defeito de Fabricação =

Studio album by Tom Zé
- Released: 1998
- Recorded: 1998
- Genre: MPB
- Length: 36:35
- Label: Luaka Bop

Tom Zé chronology
Com Defeito de Fabricação (1998)	Postmodern Platos (1999)

Professional ratings
Review scores
Source	Rating
AllMusic	4/5 stars
Robert Christgau	A−

Fabrication Defect (Com Defeito de Fabricação) is an album by the Brazilian musician Tom Zé, released in 1998. It is a concept album about the likelihood of humans becoming androids due to the forces of economic manipulation; "genetic defects", like the desire to dance, are the only things preventing the transformation.

Zé supported the album by touring with Tortoise as his backing band. A remix EP, Postmodern Platos, was released in 1999.

== Critical reception ==
Rolling Stone thought that the album "exhibits a symphonic precision rare in music of such percussive complexity." CMJ New Music Report called the album "a stunning return," writing that Zé is "perhaps the last Brazilian Tropicalista to remain totally true to his iconoclastic roots."

The Orange County Register stated that Fabrication Defect "showcases [Zé's] off-kilter cultural cut 'n' paste style in which everything from a 'rubber balloon on tooth' to bottles can become a musical instrument." The Village Voice concluded that "Zé doesn't simply cut and paste digital bits together into a martial disco beat, preferring unlikely material displacements of musique concrète."

AllMusic wrote that "the album is a fragmented blend of skittish acoustic guitars, booming electronic rhythms, shouted slogans, bizarre found-sound tape loops, and near-psychedelic production tricks."

== Track listing ==
1. Defect 1: Gene
2. Defect 2: Curiosidade
3. Defect 3: Politicar
4. Defect 4: Emerê
5. Defect 5: O Olho Do Lago
6. Defect 6: Esteticar
7. Defect 7: Dançar
8. Defect 8: ONU, Arma Mortal
9. Defect 9: Juventude Javali
10. Defect 10: Cedotardar
11. Defect 11: Tangolomango
12. Defect 12: Valsar
13. Defect 13: Burrice
14. Defect 14: Xiquexique

== Personnel ==
- Adriano Cintra – engineer
