= Mike Caren =

American songwriter

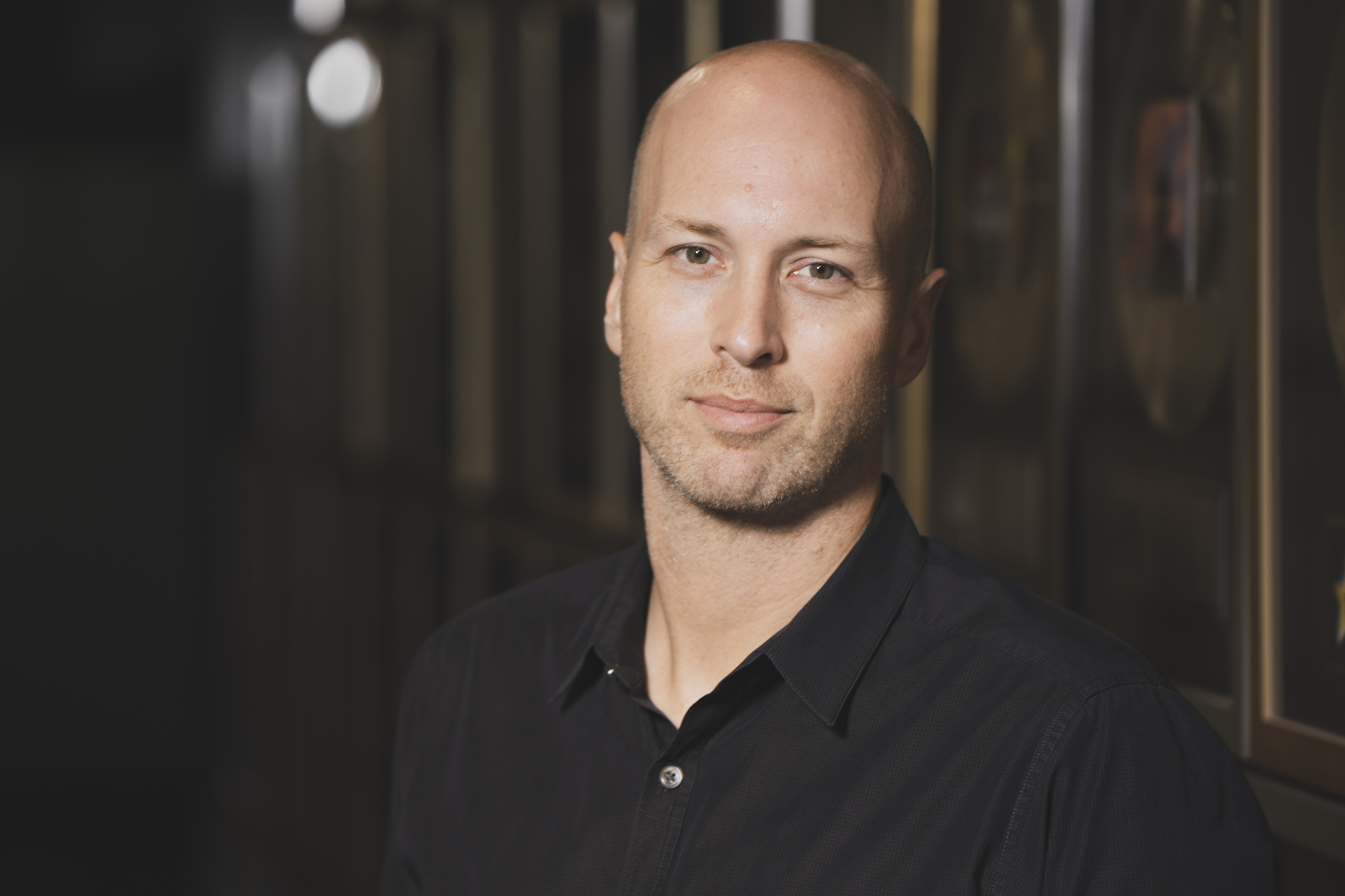
- Caren in 2022
- Education: Stern School of Business
- Occupations: Record producer; songwriter; record executive; music publisher
- Website: http://artistpg.com

Michael Caren is an American record executive. He founded Artist Publishing Company in 2007, as well as its subsidiary Artist Partner Group in 2013. He has served as President of Worldwide A&R at Warner Music Group from 2012 to 2015, as well as the company's Creative Officer until 2020, Executive Vice President of A&R at Atlantic Records from 2007 to 2012, and Co-president of Elektra Entertainment from 2008 to 2012.

== Early life ==
Caren grew up in Beverly Hills, California. When he was 12 years old, he began DJing at local parties in his neighborhood. He attended Beverly Hills High School and worked on a radio and music video show on the school channel. While still in high school, at age 15, Caren was offered an internship at Interscope Records by Fade Duvernay. He also founded a Los Angeles–based high school and college marketing company called Skool Rules Promotions. He attended the Stern School of Business at New York University.

== Career ==
At age 17, Caren was hired by Big Beat Records (owned by Atlantic Records) for a marketing job, and moved from Los Angeles to New York City to take the role. During his time at Big Beat, he produced songs for the bands The Pharcyde, Heltah Skeltah, Saukrates, and several hip hop artists. After two years in the marketing department, Caren switched over to A&R. Among the first artists he brought to Big Beat was Chicago rapper Twista. While an intern at Interscope Records, Caren worked on a marketing campaign for Tupac Shakur. He then worked for Loud Records, an imprint of RCA Records as a National High School/College Representative Coordinator, and Ruthless Records as a National Marketing Manager.

Caren was promoted to Executive Vice President of A&R at Atlantic Records in 2007. He directly signed acts to label including Trina, Sunshine Anderson, and Trick Daddy. He also discovered and signed Nappy Roots while the group was attending school at Western Kentucky University. Throughout his time with Atlantic, Caren has signed artists including T.I., Plies, Trey Songz, Flo Rida, and Wiz Khalifa, among others. He founded the Artist Publishing Group, a music publishing company in conjunction with Warner/Chappell Music in 2007.

In 2009, Caren was named Co-President of the revived Warner-owned Elektra Records alongside John Janick. In his capacity as co-head of the label, he signed and worked directly with artists including CeeLo Green, Bruno Mars, and Ed Sheeran. In 2012, Caren was named Warner Music Group's President of Worldwide A&R. In this post, he was responsible for artist development across the company's record labels Atlantic Records, Elektra Records, Warner Bros. Records, as well as its international affiliates. In the following year, Caren launched Artist Partners Group, a sister-company to Artist Publishing Group which acts as a record label and provides direct marketing, business development, mentoring, and legal support for artists.

In 2016, Caren was named the Creative Officer of the Warner Music Group. In this role, Caren acted as an advisor to WMG's global A&R department. WMG also made a multi-millionaire dollar investment in Artist Partners Group, which houses acts including Kevin Gates and Charlie Puth. His Artist Publishing Group company is responsible for 30 Billboard Hot 100 entries during 2015.

In 2021, post a transition with Warner Music, Caren’s Artist Partner Group launched the 2.0, fully independent stage. The first single was Jason Derulo featuring Adam Levine “Lifestyle”, was certified RIAA Gold. It was produced by Artist Publishing Clients Rice N Peas and co written by Artist Publishing client Amy Allen.

In 2022, Caren joined beatBread's Artist Advocacy Council, which provides critical advice to the independent artist-focused music funding platform.

He also announced his partnership with 100 Management, and the representation of producers Cirkut and Alex Da Kid.

In 2023, Caren’s Artist Partner Group announced RIAA certifications of four songs by Odetari, certification of Soldier Kidd’ “Thug Paradise” and platinum certification of Cico P’s “Tampa.” Caren announced his role in co founding social media marketing place Sound.me along with Alex Akimov.

In 2024, Caren announced his role as a co-founder of JEN Music AI, a text to prompt music platform. Caren also announced the official launch of Release.Global, a distribution and marketing platform for independent artists. He also announced Artist Publishing Group’s signing of Veeze, Rich Amiri, Alec Benjamin, and others. Artist Partner announced RIAA certifications of singles by label and publishing client, Lay Bankz.

In 2024, Artist Publishing Group was named #6 on Billboard Magazine's Top Publishing Corporations and the #1 fully independent Publisher. Also, Artist Partner Group was one of only 8 labels to have 3 or more artists with RIAA certifications for the first time. Release.Global distribution also announced real time payment systems in partnership with Trolly which has enabled the distribution platform to some of the industries fastest payments.

== Selected discography ==
List of written or produced songs, showing artist, album, year of release, and selected chart history
Song	Year	Artist	Album	Notes
"She Said"	1996	The Pharcyde	Labcabincalifornia	
"Black Fonzirelliz"	1998	Heltah Skeltah	Magnum Force	
"Riches to Rags (Mmmkay)"	1999	Nappy Roots	Music From And Inspired By The Motion Picture South Park: Bigger, Longer & Uncut	
"Just a Ride"	2003	Jem	Finally Woken	
"Take Control"	2007	Amerie	Because I Love It	US R&B #66
"Swagga Like Us"	2008	T.I. feat. Kanye West, Jay-Z, and Lil Wayne	Paper Trail	US #5
"I Love College"	2009	Asher Roth	Asleep in the Bread Aisle	US #12
"Jump"	2009	Flo Rida feat. Nelly Furtado	R.O.O.T.S.	US #54
"Sugar"	2009	Flo Rida feat. Wynter Gordon	R.O.O.T.S.	US #5
"Hot Mess"	2009	Cobra Starship	Hot Mess	US #64
"Hell of a Life"	2010	Kanye West	My Beautiful Dark Twisted Fantasy	
"Dirty Talk"	2010	Wynter Gordon	With The Music I Die	US Dance #1
"The Other Side"	2010	Bruno Mars	It's Better If You Don't Understand	
"Club Can't Handle Me"	2010	Flo Rida feat. David Guetta	Only One Flo (Part 1)	US #9
"Everybody's Girl"	2011	Jennifer Lopez	Love?	
"Bleed Out"	2011	Jason Derulo	Bleed Out	
"Where Them Girls At"	2011	David Guetta feat. Flo Rida and Nicki Minaj	Nothing but the Beat	US #14
"I Cry"	2012	Flo Rida	Wild Ones	US #6
"Ring Off"	2013	Beyoncé	Beyoncé	US R&B #31
"G.D.F.R."	2014	Flo Rida feat. Sage the Gemini and Lookas	My House	US #8
"Oops"	2016	Little Mix feat. Charlie Puth	Glory Days	UK #41
"Barbie Dreams"	2023	Fifty Fifty feat. Kaliii	Barbie the Album	
