= Because I Love It =

Studio album by Amerie
- Released: May 11, 2007
- Recorded: 2005–2007
- Studios: Wonderland, New Jersey
- Length: 51:25
- Label: Columbia
- Producers: Amerie (also exec.); Len Nicholson (exec.); Bink!; The Buchanans; Mike Caren; Chris & Drop; Bryan-Michael Cox; Cee-Lo Green; Rich Harrison; Kore & Bellek; One Up; Curtis "C Note" Richardson

Amerie chronology
Touch (2005)	Because I Love It (2007)	Best 15 Things (2009)

Singles from Because I Love It
- 1. "Take Control" Released: October 17, 2006; 2. "Gotta Work" Released: April 14, 2007; 3. "That's What U R" Released: October 23, 2007

Because I Love It is the third studio album by American singer Amerie. It was released internationally on May 11, 2007, by Columbia Records, but did not receive a domestic release until September 30, 2008, following earlier Walmart- and FYE-exclusive editions after its original 2006 release plan under the title None of the Above was delayed. Primarily an R&B album with influences of funk, soul, hip hop, and 1980s-inspired pop, it was executive produced by Amerie and Lenny Nicholson and featured production from Bryan-Michael Cox, Cee-Lo Green, The Buchanans, and others, marking Amerie's first album without longtime collaborator Rich Harrison as a primary producer.

The album received widespread critical acclaim, with reviewers praising Amerie's genre-blending sound and retro-inspired R&B sound, although some criticized its ballads or felt its stylistic ambition occasionally overshadowed her individuality. Despite the positive reviews, the album was released in the United States only through select retailers before its wider physical release on September 30, 2008, after Amerie had left Columbia Records and all planned singles and promotion were canceled, causing it to miss the Billboard 200. Nevertheless, it achieved moderate success in Europe and Japan, peaking at number 17 on the UK Albums Chart and earning a silver certification from the British Phonographic Industry (BPI).

== Background ==
In April 2005, Amerie released her second studio album Touch, which built on the success of her debut All I Have (2002) and introduced her to a wider international audience. Chiefly produced by mentor-producer Rich Harrison, the album debuted at number five on the US Billboard 200 with first-week sales of 124,000 copies, was certified gold by the Recording Industry Association of America (RIAA) for sales exceeding 500,000 copies, and also reached number three on the UK R&B Albums Chart, where it was later certified gold. It produced three singles, led by "1 Thing," Amerie's biggest commercial hit, which reached the top 10 in the United States, the United Kingdom, Ireland, Finland, Denmark, Norway, and Scotland, followed by the more modestly performing "Touch" and "Talkin' About."

Recording sessions for Amerie's project, Because I Love It, began in 2005. Originally titled None of the Above and scheduled for a late 2006 release, the project was delayed before being completed in early 2007. The original title reflected the singer's desire to avoid being confined to a single category, as she explained that the album allowed her to explore different sounds and creative directions without being "boxed in." She described the project as a blend of influences ranging from 1970s funk to 1980s music, combined with her signature R&B style. Executive produced by Amerie and her husband-manager Lenny Nicholson, she worked with producers Bryan-Michael Cox, The Buchanans, CeeLo Green, Mike Caren, Curtis "C Note" Richardson, and others, while longtime collaborator Harrison did not contribute new production.

== Release and promotion ==
Because I Love It was released for the UK iTunes Store on May 11, 2007, through Columbia Records. It was released physically on May 14, 2007, in the United Kingdom. It was released in Japan two days later and in Europe on May 28. In the United States, the album was released on CD through Walmart on July 3, 2007, and though FYE on January 15, 2008; it was not given a wider physical release until September 30, 2008, though Amerie was no longer signed to Columbia at that point. Because of this, the album was not promoted in the United States. Worldwide, Because I Love It was promoted by three singles: "Take Control", "Gotta Work" and "That's What U R".

In the United States, the album was released exclusively through retailers such as Walmart and FYE, before its physical release was officially made available on September 30, 2008, by which point all future singles and promotion had been scrapped due to Amerie's departure from Columbia Records. As a result, the album failed to chart on the Billboard 200, becoming Amerie's first studio album to do so. Nevertheless, the album was a moderate success in Europe and Japan, and has been certified silver by the British Phonographic Industry (BPI).

== Singles ==
"Take Control" was released as the lead single from the album on October 17, 2006. Its accompanying music video debuted in the United States in December 2006. The song peaked at number 66 on the US Billboard Hot R&B/Hip-Hop Songs chart, but was considerably more successful overseas, reaching number 10 in the United Kingdom. The official remix featured South Korean singer Seven and was featured as a bonus track on the East Asian edition of the album.

"Gotta Work" was released as the album's second single outside the United States on April 14, 2007. It was used to help promote TNT's coverage of the 2008 NBA All-Star Game in the United States, and AXN Television in Asia. The single peaked at number 21 on the UK Singles Chart and number six on the UK R&B Singles Chart.

"Crush" was scheduled as the third single, but its release was cancelled. A remix of "Crush" produced by Johnny Douglas was intended to be used for the radio version of the single. Instead, "That's What U R" was released as the album's third and final single for a limited promotional-only basis on October 23, 2007. The radio version was a remix featuring rap verses by Fabolous and Slim Thug. The version can be found on some Asian limited editions of Because I Love It.

== Critical reception ==
Professional ratings
Review scores
Source	Rating
About.com	2.5/5 stars
AllMusic	4.5/5 stars
Evening Standard	4/4 stars
The Guardian	4/5 stars
NME	7/10
Pitchfork	7.3/10
Stylus Magazine	B
Time Out	5/5 stars
The Times	4/5 stars

Because I Love It received wide acclaim from various music critics. AllHipHop's Alex Thornton praised the album giving it five out of five stars, stating that Amerie has the "ability to convey excitement without sounding insane" but pointing out that "doesn't fit neatly into any specific genre anyway, so she might as well leave the standard R&B fare to the army of standard R&B chicks available to sing them." AllMusic editor Andy Kellman also praised the album, stating that the album "lassoe[d] each song, whether it require[d] salt, sugar, heartache, delight, or any combination thereof" and further noting that "[s]he is the only female singer on the album, and hearing her backgrounds dance and swim around her leads is as moving as anything else in modern R&B". Despite mixed criticism towards its ballads, Marc Hogan from Spin praised the album's sound and called it "R&B at its most dynamic". Writing for The Observer, Killian Fox gave it a favorable review, writing "It's no classic, but the obligatory ballads are mercifully few, allowing a series of punchy, soulpowered tracks to shine".

The Guardian's Alex Macpherson lauded Amerie as "one of the greatest singers in pop music" and wrote that Because I Love It was a "spectacular work" because she "catches the fleeting thrills and momentary rushes of intensity that permeate otherwise mundane days, and stretches those feelings out across four-minute songs without ever letting up." Priya Elan from NME described the album as "bar-raising pop" and called it a "whip-smart collection of retro R&B that's more Winehouse than Aguilera". Tim Finney of Pitchfork noted that the album's "big, risky strategic manoeuvre is a plush, post-coital riposte to Ciara's recent electro-pop revivalism, with many of the songs here investing in a deliberately frothy eighties sound that smears together Prince, Jam & Lewis, and the SOS Band", adding that "[t]he danger for [Amerie] is that in trying so hard to clinch this new style she leaves little room to assert her own individual qualities". Lou Thomas from BBC Music called the album "a mix of the sweat-drenched sublime and the saccharine ridiculous", while commenting that "[t]here's still a flavour of the percussive, filthy Washington DC Go-go sound that gives her music a satisfying and unique feel within the pop world, but at other times the sugar content will repulse all but those with the sweetest tune tooth. And songwriter She McElroy's suggestion to add old school Weekend Love was genius."

== Commercial performance ==
Because I Love It was a moderate success but failed to repeat the success of previous studio albums All I Have (2002) and Touch (2005). It failed to chart in both the United States and Canada, since it was not released in those countries until September 30, 2008 (more than a year after it was released worldwide). It only charted on some European charts (including Billboard's European Top 100 Albums chart, where it peaked at number 56) and Japanese Oricon chart, where it peaked at number 13. The album peaked at number 17 on UK Albums Chart and number four on UK R&B Albums Chart. It has sold over 60,000 copies in United Kingdom and has been certified silver by British Phonographic Industry (BPI).

Because I Love It was the final album by Amerie to be released through Columbia Records, also her first not to be released through Harrison's recording label Richcraft Records. It was also Amerie's final album to be released through Sony BMG Music Entertainment and Sony Music Entertainment before Amerie signed a recording contract with Universal Music Group's Def Jam Recordings and Island Records in 2008.

== Track listing ==
Standard edition
No.	Title	Writer(s)	Producer(s)	Length
1.	"Forecast Intro"	Amerie Mi Marie; Chris Paultre; Derrick Braxton; Bob James	Chris & Drop; Amerie^{[a]}	1:10
2.	"Hate2LoveU"	Marie; Ezekiel "Zeke" Lewis; J. Que; Candice Nelson; Balewa Muhammad; Robert Bell; Ronald Bell; George Brown; Robert Mickens; Gene Redd; Claydes Smith; Woodrow Sparrow; Dennis Thomas; Richard Westfield	One Up; Amerie^{[a]}^{[b]}; Len Nicholson^{[b]}	3:11
3.	"Some Like It"	Marie; Lenvert Nicholson; Anne Dudley; Malcolm McLaren	Marie; Nicholson; Qur'an Goodman^{[c]}; Dante "Destro" Barton^{[c]}; Amerie^{[a]}	2:56
4.	"Make Me Believe"	Marie; Curtis Mayfield	Marie^{[d]}; Nicholson; The Buchanans	3:22
5.	"Take Control"	Marie; Cee-Lo Green; Mike Caren; Tom Zé; McElroy; Daryl Hall; John Oates; Sara Allen	Caren; Cee-Lo Green^{[c]}^{[a]}; Amerie^{[c]}^{[a]}; Nicholson^{[c]}	3:42
6.	"Gotta Work"	Marie; Rich Shelton; Loren Hill; Kevin Veney; Isaac Hayes; David Porter	One Up; Amerie^{[a]}	3:10
7.	"Crush"	Marie; Makeda Davis; Simon (Wiz) Johnson; Andre Gonzales	One Up; The Buchanans; Amerie^{[a]}	3:39
8.	"Crazy Wonderful"	Marie; Johnson; Gonzales	One Up; The Buchanans; Amerie^{[a]}	3:48
9.	"That's What U R"	Marie; Paultre; Braxton	Chris & Drop; Amerie^{[a]}	3:36
10.	"When Loving U Was Easy"	Marie; Curtis Richardson	Curtis "C Note" Richardson; Amerie^{[a]}	3:21
11.	"Paint Me Over"	Marie; Roosevelt Harrell; Willie Hutch	Bink!; Amerie^{[c]}^{[a]}	4:12
12.	"Somebody Up There"	Marie; Bryan-Michael Cox	Cox; Amerie^{[a]}	4:45
13.	"All Roads"	Marie; Richardson; Alan Bergman; Marilyn Bergman; Michel Legrand	Richardson; Amerie^{[a]}	3:08
Total length:				44:00

International edition bonus tracks
No.	Title	Writer(s)	Producer(s)	Length
14.	"1 Thing"	Marie; Rich Harrison; Stanley Walden	Harrison	3:59
15.	"Losing U"	Marie; Khaled Hadj Brahim	Kore & Bellek; Amerie^{[a]}	3:26
Total length:				51:25

International digital bonus track
No.	Title	Writer(s)	Producer(s)	Length
16.	"1 Thing" (featuring Eve)	Marie; Harrison; Walden; Eve Jeffers	Harrison	4:18
Total length:				55:33

iTunes Store bonus track
No.	Title	Writer(s)	Producer(s)	Length
16.	"Streets Alone"	Marie; Paultre; Braxton	Chris & Drop	4:17
Total length:				55:32

Asian and US reissue bonus track
No.	Title	Writer(s)	Length
16.	"Take Control" (featuring Seven)	Marie; Green; Caren; Zé; Waldez; Hall; Oates; Allen	3:43
Total length:			55:08

Japanese bonus track
No.	Title	Writer(s)	Length
17.	"Take Control" (Old Nick Mix)	Marie; Green; Caren; Zé; Waldez; Hall; Oates; Allen	3:44
Total length:			58:52

French bonus tracks
No.	Title	Writer(s)	Producer(s)	Length
3.	"Crunk Didi (Losing U)" (featuring Willy Denzey and Sixcoups MC)	Marie; Brahim	Kore & Bellek; Amerie^{[a]}	3:37
15.	"1 Thing"	Marie; Rich Harrison; Stanley Walden	Harrison	3:59
16.	"Losing U"	Marie; Brahim	Kore & Bellek; Amerie^{[a]}	3:26
Total length:				55:02

Notes

- ^{^[a]} signifies a vocal producer
- ^{^[b]} signifies a co-producer
- ^{^[c]} signifies an additional producer
- ^{^[d]} signifies a main and vocal producer

Sample credits

- "Forecast Intro" contains samples from "Farandole" by Bob James.
- "Hate 2 Love U" contains samples from "Give It Up" by Kool & the Gang.
- "Some Like It" contains samples from "World's Famous" by Malcolm McLaren.
- "Make Me Believe" contains samples from "Make Me Believe In You" by Curtis Mayfield.
- "Take Control" contains excerpts from "Jimmy, Renda-se" by Tom Zé and elements of "You Make My Dreams" by Hall & Oates.
- "Gotta Work" contains samples from "Hold On I'm Coming" by Mighty Dog Haynes.
- "Paint Me Over" contains samples from "Mother's Theme (Mama)" by Willie Hutch.
- "All Roads" contains samples from "How Do You Keep the Music Playing?" by James Ingram and Patti Austin.
- "1 Thing" contains excerpts from "Oh, Calcutta!" by the Meters.
- "Losing U" contains a sample from "Didi" by Khaled.

== Charts ==
Chart (2007)	Peak position
European Albums (Billboard)	56
French Albums (SNEP)	159
Irish Albums (IRMA)	65
Japanese Albums (Oricon)	13
Scottish Albums (Official Charts)	38
Swiss Albums (Schweizer Hitparade)	42
UK Albums (Official Charts)	17
UK R&B Albums (Official Charts)	4

== Certifications ==
Region	Certification	Certified units/sales
United Kingdom (BPI)	Silver	60,000^{^}
^{^} Shipments figures based on certification alone.

== Release history ==
Region	Date	Format(s)	Label	Ref.
Germany	May 11, 2007	CD; digital download	Sony BMG	
United Kingdom	May 11, 2007	Digital download	RCA	
China	May 14, 2007	CD; digital download	Sony BMG	
United Kingdom	May 14, 2007	CD	RCA	
Japan	May 16, 2007	CD; digital download	Sony BMG	
France	May 28, 2007	CD; digital download	Sony BMG	
United States	July 3, 2007	CD (Walmart exclusive)	Columbia	
United States	January 15, 2008	CD (FYE exclusive)	Columbia	
United States	September 30, 2008	CD	Columbia	
