= Tetsuo & Youth =

Studio album by Lupe Fiasco
- Released: January 20, 2015
- Studios: The Echo Bar (Los Angeles); Simon Sayz (Glendale); Wonderland
- Genre: Hip-hop
- Length: 78:43
- Labels: 1st & 15; Atlantic
- Producers: Blood Diamonds; DJ Dahi; JackLNDN; Keyz; Lupe Fiasco; Marcus Stephens; MoeZart; Quality Kid; S1; Simonsayz; VohnBeatz; Wiz Buchanan

Lupe Fiasco chronology
Food & Liquor II: The Great American Rap Album Pt. 1 (2012)	Tetsuo & Youth (2015)	Drogas Light (2017)

Singles from Tetsuo & Youth
- 1. "Deliver" Released: November 10, 2014

Tetsuo & Youth is the fifth studio album by American rapper Lupe Fiasco. The album was released on January 20, 2015, by 1st & 15th Entertainment and Atlantic Records.

Tetsuo & Youth was supported by the lead single, "Deliver". The album received generally positive reviews from critics, citing it as a significant improvement and return to form in comparison to Fiasco's previous work. It debuted at number 14 on the US Billboard 200, selling 42,000 copies in its first week.

== Background ==
On February 10, 2013, on the red carpet for the Grammy Awards, Lupe Fiasco announced that his fifth studio album would be titled Tetsuo & Youth. LupEND (a blog for Lupe Fiasco fans) confirmed on his Tumblr account that features on his album would include guest appearances from Rick Ross, Big K.R.I.T., Chance the Rapper, Ab-Soul, Ed Sheeran and Ty Dolla Sign, among others. Lupe Fiasco says the name of the album was loosely inspired by Tetsuo Shima, a character from the Japanese manga series Akira. "For me, Tetsuo sounds cool" he stated. When contrasting Tetsuo & Youth with fellow rapper Kanye West's studio album Yeezus (2013), Lupe Fiasco explained that the album wouldn't be as open for interpretation, planning on "making it simple enough for you to understand exactly what I'm talking about from the time that you hear it."

== Singles ==
On August 24, 2013, Lupe revealed a preview of a song, titled "Crack". The song features a guest appearance from American singer Chris Brown. The song was first said to be the first single released from the album, but since then has not been officially released. Another song, titled "Drizzy's Law" which was intended to make the album cut, has also not officially been released.

On October 14, 2013, Lupe released a standalone single, titled "Old School Love". The song features a guest appearance from English singer-songwriter Ed Sheeran, who contributes vocals to the song's hook. The song peaked at number 93 on the US Billboard Hot 100. Its music video was filmed with Sheeran in Chicago, and was premiered on December 9, 2013.

On May 19, 2014, Lupe released the first promotional single, titled "Mission", which tells the story of several cancer sufferers. The intro of the song features American singer-songwriter (and cancer survivor) Charlie Wilson and other cancer survivors detailing their type of cancer and when they were diagnosed.

On June 24, 2014, Lupe released the second promotional single, titled "Next to It". The song features a guest appearance from American singer Ty Dolla Sign. The song was also produced by Ty Dolla Sign, and co-produced by Shafiq Husayn of the Los Angeles production team Sa-Ra.

On November 10, 2014, Lupe released the first official single from Tetsuo & Youth, titled "Deliver", which features background vocals by Ty Dolla Sign.

== Critical reception ==
Professional ratings
Aggregate scores
Source	Rating
AnyDecentMusic?	6.9/10
Metacritic	80/100
Review scores
Source	Rating
AllMusic	4/5 stars
The A.V. Club	B+
Consequence	B
Cuepoint (Expert Witness)	A−
Exclaim!	8/10
HipHopDX	4.5/5
Pitchfork	7.2/10
PopMatters	8/10
Rolling Stone	3/5 stars
XXL	4/5

Tetsuo & Youth was met with generally positive reviews. At Metacritic, which assigns a normalized rating out of 100 to reviews from mainstream publications, the album received an average score of 80, based on 12 reviews. Aggregator AnyDecentMusic? gave it 6.9 out of 10, based on their assessment of the critical consensus.

David Jeffries of AllMusic said, "His 2006 debut may still be the one to pick, since it's leaner and more instant, but Tetsuo & Youth strolls its way into greatness after a couple listens and wipes out all the bitter aftertaste of Lasers as if that misstep never happened." Sheldon Pearce of The A.V. Club said, "Tetsuo & Youth finds its equilibrium by not pushing as hard, opting for subtle and interesting angles to get points across (See: "Deliver")." Michael Madden of Consequence said, "Lupe is still a guy to root for, and Tetsuo & Youth is full of daring songs that remind you of why." Kevin Jones of Exclaim! said, "Tetsuo & Youth is Lupe's "magnum opus" record – a serious, detail-rich production free from the binds of a previous story or series, and one that turns its back completely on any pressure to placate commercial radio." Stephen F. Kearse of Paste said, "On the whole, Tetsuo and Youth is a shaky album by a newly energized Lupe Fiasco. This energy isn't always wielded coherently or even interestingly, but he seems to have found comfort in his murals and dots and lines."

Steve "Flash" Juon of RapReviews said, "Lupe Fiasco doesn't present tracks that are just a hot beat and some memorable bars—he's aiming for cinematic moments and drawing you into the atmosphere he seeks to create." Justin Hunte of HipHopDX said, "Tetsuo & Youth glistens with maturity and imagination. Where the Judo Master of Juxtaposition has grown more challenging lyrically, he's also grown more naturally emotive." Jayson Greene of Pitchfork said, "It's a tricky muse, but every Lupe project has found a way to harness at least 15 or 20 minutes of his fluid, fleeting mind. Tetsuo & Youth is the most generous gulp he's managed in years." Sean McCarthy of PopMatters said, "At the end of the album, it's more than clear that third, fourth, and fifth listens are demanded to appreciate its scope." Kellan Miller of XXL said, "Lupe Fiasco's career has been a mix of blooming ingenuity and surprising mediocrity. Sonically separated by the four different seasons, Lupe has arguably released his most thematically layered and engaging album to date." Christopher R. Weingarten of Rolling Stone said, "Lupe Fiasco's fifth album is a swirl of double meanings, extended metaphors about yoga and math, and increasingly labyrinthine ways to say "I'm dope"."

=== Rankings ===
Select rankings of Tetsuo & Youth
Publication	List	Rank	Ref.
Complex	The Best Albums of 2015	11	
Rolling Stone	40 Best Rap Albums of 2015	27	

== Commercial performance ==
Tetsuo & Youth debuted at number 14 on the US Billboard 200, with first-week sales of 42,000 copies in the United States. In its second week the album fell to number 37, selling 12,000 copies.

== Track listing ==
Tetsuo & Youth track listing
No.	Title	Writer(s)	Producer(s)	Length
1.	"Summer"			1:26
2.	"Mural"	Wasalu Jaco; S. Johnson; Kyle Davidson; Devan Hampton; Alain Mion	Wiz Buchanan; Keyz; Quality Kid	8:48
3.	"Blur My Hands" (featuring Guy Sebastian)	Jaco; Larry Griffin, Jr.; Javohn Griffin	S1; VohnBeatz	5:27
4.	"Dots & Lines"	Jaco; Simon Morel; Jack Aisher	Lupe Fiasco; Simonsayz; JackLNDN	6:32
5.	"Fall"			1:13
6.	"Prisoner 1 & 2" (featuring Ayesha Jaco)	Jaco; Maurice Thomas	MoeZart	8:36
7.	"Body of Work" (featuring Troi Irons and Terrace Martin)	Jaco; L. Griffin, Jr.; J. Griffin	S1; VohnBeatz; Lupe Fiasco^{[a]}	5:53
8.	"Little Death" (featuring Nikki Jean)	Jaco; L. Griffin, Jr.; J. Griffin; Nicholle Leary	S1; VohnBeatz	4:29
9.	"No Scratches" (featuring Nikki Jean)	Jaco; Morel; Robert Kelly	Simonsayz	4:22
10.	"Winter"			1:31
11.	"Chopper" (featuring Billy Blue, Buk of Psychodrama, Trouble, Trae tha Truth, Fam-Lay and Glasses Malone)	Jaco; Dacoury Natche; Adam Feeney; Jeffery Robinson; Mariel Orr; Nathaniel Johnson; Frazier Thompson; Charles Penniman; Pedritho Dorsonne	DJ Dahi	9:32
12.	"Deliver"	Jaco; M. Thomas; Tyrone Griffin; Paris Jones	MoeZart	3:52
13.	"Madonna (And Other Mothers in the Hood)" (featuring Nikki Jean)	Jaco; Natche; Leary	DJ Dahi	4:43
14.	"Adoration of the Magi" (featuring Crystal Torres)	Jaco; Natche	DJ Dahi	5:06
15.	"They. Resurrect. Over. New." (featuring Ab-Soul and Troi Irons)	Jaco; Natche; Michael Tucker; Herbert Stevens	DJ Dahi; Blood Diamonds	5:38
16.	"Spring"			1:35

Notes

- ^{^[a]} signifies an additional producer
- "Dots & Lines" features background vocals by Nikki Jean
- "Prisoner 1 & 2" contains additional vocals by Nikki Jean
- "Body of Work" features additional vocals by Marisol
- "Deliver" features additional vocals by PJ and Ty Dolla Sign

Sample credits

- "Mural" contains elements of "Chanson d'Un Jour d'Hiver", performed by Alain Mion and Cortex.
- "No Scratches" contains a sample of "You Remind Me of Something", performed by R. Kelly.

== Charts ==
=== Weekly charts ===
Chart performance for Tetsuo & Youth
Chart (2015)	Peak position
Australian Albums (ARIA)	69
Belgian Albums (Ultratop Flanders)	183
UK Albums (Official Charts)	58
US Billboard 200	14
US Top R&B/Hip-Hop Albums (Billboard)	2

=== Year-end charts ===
2015 year-end chart performance for Tetsuo & Youth
Chart (2015)	Position
US Top R&B/Hip-Hop Albums (Billboard)	61
