= Estudando o Pagode =

Studio album by Tom Zé
- Released: 9 August 2005
- Genres: MPB, avant-pop
- Length: 63:27
- Labels: Trama Records (Brazil); Luaka Bop (United States)

Tom Zé chronology
Imprensa Cantada (2003)	Estudando o Pagode (2005)	Danç-Êh-Sá (2006)

Professional ratings
Aggregate scores
Source	Rating
Metacritic	86/100
Review scores
Source	Rating
AllMusic	4/5 stars
Blender	4/5 stars
Christgau’s Consumer Guide	A−
Entertainment Weekly	B+
Los Angeles Times	4/4 stars
Pitchfork	7.9/10
PopMatters	9/10
Spin	A
Stylus	A
Uncut	8/10

The title of Tom Zé's 2005 release, Estudando o Pagode, literally means "studying pagode" (the subgenre of samba). This album is a three-act operetta about women and their relationship to men. Zé refers to the album as being masculist in that "it calls man's attention to the huge disadvantage he has created in his present relationship with women."^{1} As is common in Zé's music, this album incorporates novel sounds such as a braying donkey and those created from an instrument made out of ficus (fig) leaves.

== Track listing ==
1. "Ave Dor Maria" – 3:27
2. "Estúpido Rapaz" – 3:23
3. "Proposta de Amor" – 2:24
4. "Quero Pensar (A Mulher de Bath)" – 4:01
5. "Mulher Navio Negreiro" – 5:01
6. "Pagode-Enredo dos Tempos do Medo" – 4:10
7. "Canção de Nora (Casa de Bonecas)" – 1:47
8. "O Amor é Um Rock" – 4:14
9. "Duas Opinioes" – 4:46
10. "Elaeu" – 4:33
11. "Vibração da Carne" – 3:38
12. "Para lá do Pará" – 4:02
13. "Prazer Carnal" – 4:40
14. "Teatro (Dom Quixote)" – 4:52
15. "A Volta do Trem das Onze (8.5 Milhões de km²)" – 5:06
16. "Beatles a Granel" – 3:23

== Release history ==
Country	Date	Label
Brazil	9 August 2005	Trama Records
United States	20 April 2006	Luaka Bop
