= Drive (Amerie EP) =

EP by Ameriie
- Released: May 20, 2016
- Recorded: 2011–2016
- Genres: R&B; soul
- Length: 22:49
- Labels: Feeniix Rising, TuneCore
- Producers: Mike City; The Buchanans; Rich Harrison; Focus...

Ameriie chronology
| In Love & War (2009) | Drive (2016) | 4AM Mulholland (2018) |

Singles from Drive
- 1. "Out Loud" Released: March 16, 2015

Drive is the first extended play (EP) by the American recording artist Amerie. It was released for online streaming and purchase on May 20, 2016, by her independent recording label Feeniix Rising Entertainment. It contains production by Mike City and Focus..., as well as her long-time collaborators, The Buchanans and Rich Harrison. The lead single, "Out Loud", was released on March 16, 2015. It was her first musical release since her fourth studio album, In Love & War (2009). The EP was recorded at the same time as her upcoming studio albums Cymatika, Vol. 1 and BILI. A following EP was announced for July 2016, but nothing came out from those plans.

== Background and release ==
In July 2011, it was reported that Ameriie was in the studio working on her fifth studio album, titled Cymatika Vol. 1. The EP's title is based on the word cymatics, the study of visible sound and vibration. The production line-up consists of, among others, Riley Urick, The Buchanans and Andre Harris (of Dre & Vidal). Ameriie said that she may reunite with Rich Harrison for the project but that it would be "a matter of when and in what way". Cymatika Vol. 1 will also include special guest appearances from Drunken Tiger's Tiger JK and Tasha Reid. According to the singer, Cymatika will explore freedom, androgyny, and the new world order, and is influenced by trance, electronica, house, and new wave. Second and third volumes of Cymatika are planned.

In 2012, Ameriie announced a forthcoming 'mini-LP' titled The Prelude; subsequently, in 2013, she stated that she had been working on a new project, Because I Love It Vol. II, a follow-up to her 2007 album. Ameriie said that this album, now titled BILI, stemmed from songs that did not fit sonically or thematically onto Cymatika—"songs that are heavy in percussion, but have a very aggressive, soulful element to them. They don't exist in any one time, or sound of the moment." BILI and Cymatika are both slated for release in 2015. A single, "What I Want" (which samples "Apache" by Incredible Bongo Band), was released from BILI in 2014. Later in the year, Ameriie premiered the track "Mustang" and announced a UK tour for March 2015. In March 2015, Ameriie collaborated with long-time friend and producer Rich Harrison on a single, "Out Loud". She promoted the song through live performances and made it available on SoundCloud and YouTube. In May 2016, she appeared on The Breakfast Club and announced an EP titled Drive set for release on May 20, a second untitled EP due in July, and that she was still at work on her Cymatika album trilogy.

== Title and artwork ==
The artwork is a photo taken from a car. Ameriie said in an interview that the EP is titled Drive because it is "music that you can put in your car and drive to". It shows a road with fog and nature around it. It has Amerie's name at the bottom right (stylized as AMERIIE).

== Track listing ==
| No. | Title | Producer(s) | Length |
|---|---|---|---|
| 1. | "Every Time" (featuring Fabolous) | Focus... | 4:37 |
| 2. | "Thru the Stars" | The Buchanans | 4:05 |
| 3. | "Sing About It" | The Buchanans | 3:31 |
| 4. | "Trouble with Love" | Mike City | 3:27 |
| 5. | "Take the Blame" | The Buchanans | 3:35 |
| 6. | "Out Loud" | Rich Harrison | 3:32 |
| Total length: | | | 22:49 |

Sample credits

- "Every Time" - contains a sample of "You Don't Have to Say You Love Me" by The Floaters.

== Personnel ==
- Ameriie – primary artist (all tracks)
- Fabulous – featured artist (track 1)
- Focus... – producer (track 1)
- The Buchanans – producer (track 2, 3 and 5)
- Mike City – producer (track 4)
- Rich Harrison – producer (track 6)

== Release history ==
List of release dates, showing region, format(s), record label and reference.
| Region | Date | Format(s) | Label | Ref. |
|---|---|---|---|---|
| Various | May 20, 2016 | Streaming; digital download | Feeniix Rising | |
