= Heard 'em All =

Single by Amerie featuring Lil Wayne

from the album In Love & War
- Released: August 31, 2009
- Recorded: 2009
- Length: 3:30 (main version); 3:57 (main w/ rap featuring Lil Wayne)
- Label: Def Jam
- Songwriters: Amerie Rogers; Sean Garrett; Eric Hudson; Dwayne Carter
- Producers: Sean Garrett; Eric Hudson

Amerie singles chronology
"Why R U" (2009)	"Heard 'em All" (2009)	"Pretty Brown" (2009)

Lil Wayne singles chronology
"Forever" (2009)	"Heard 'em All" (2009)	"I Can Transform Ya" (2009)

"Heard 'em All" is a single by American singer Amerie from her fourth studio album, In Love & War, released in September 2009. In the US, the song served as the second single from the album, following "Why R U". The official radio edit of the song features rapper Lil Wayne, with both versions being featured on the album. Its release was confirmed by Def Jam's official site. It was released in the UK on April 5, 2010.

== Music video ==
The music video for "Heard 'em All" was shot in the Santa Clarita desert in California in August 2009. The video was directed by Anthony Mandler. The video is Mad Max-themed with a significant budget and pyrotechnics involved.

== Critical reception ==
Pitchfork commented that: "So now we still want to root for her, and her still-vibrant voice. So why is she aiming for this sub-Beyoncé swagger? For a song with a bunch of great elements, 'Heard 'em All' insists you recognize its greatness, while not really having any greatness at its center to appreciate—all the interesting textures and timbres surround nothing. Where's the casual elegance, the sweetness that didn't so self-consciously assert its importance? Well, it gets a few seconds in the bridge. But in the end, Amerie does her own reputation a disservice, urging us to forget that she'd heard us all talk about how much we wanted her."

== Remixes ==
In August 2009, the song leaked featuring only Amerie on vocals. Later that month, an amended version surfaced featuring rapper Lil Wayne. In September 2009, a rock remix of the song, sampling AC/DC's "Back in Black" and featuring labelmate Kain, was released for promo.

A remix of the track is featured on the Asian edition of In Love & War. Amerie collaborated with Korean girl group 4Minute and rapper Jun Hyung of Korean boy band Beast.

== Charts ==
Chart performance for "Heard 'em All"
Chart (2009)	Peak position
Germany (Deutsche Black Charts)	35
South Korea International (Gaon)	10
US Hot R&B/Hip-Hop Songs (Billboard)	81

== Release history ==
Release history for "Heard 'em All"
Region	Date	Format	Label
United States	August 31, 2009	Airplay	Def Jam
United States	September 15, 2009	Digital download	Def Jam
United States	September 2009	CD single	Def Jam
United Kingdom	April 5, 2010	CD single	Mercury
