= Take Control (Amerie song) =

2006 single by Amerie

Single by Amerie

from the album Because I Love It
- B-side: "That's What U R"; "Crunk Didi (Losing U)"
- Released: October 17, 2006
- Studio: Wonderland (New Jersey)
- Genre: R&B; funk; go-go
- Length: 3:42
- Label: Columbia; Sony Urban
- Songwriters: Amerie Mi Marie; Cee-Lo Green; Mike Caren; Tom Zé; Valdez; Daryl Hall; John Oates; Sara Allen
- Producers: Mike Caren; Cee-Lo Green (add. and vocal); Amerie (add. and vocal); Len Nicholson (add.)

Amerie singles chronology
"I Don't Care" (2005)	"Take Control" (2006)	"Gotta Work" (2007)

"Take Control" is a song by the American singer Amerie from her third studio album, Because I Love It (2007). It was released as the album's lead single on October 17, 2006. The song was written by Cee-Lo Green, Mike Caren and Amerie, and was produced by Caren, with additional production by Cee-Lo, Amerie and Len Nicholson. "Take Control" contains excerpts from the 1970 song "Jimmy, Renda-se" by the Brazilian musician Tom Zé, and elements of the 1980 song "You Make My Dreams" by Hall & Oates.

== Recording ==
After Cee-Lo wrote the song, he approached Amerie to record it. Amerie felt the song was not up-tempo enough to suit her, so she wrote a hook, a bridge, and added a horn section to add to the song her "signature" and "a different flavour", making it a "dance record".

Tori Alamaze, the reference singer on the song, said that it was originally offered to her, but Amerie denied this, saying she thought it "really wack on [Alamaze's] part" to make such a claim.

== Release and reception ==
Many critics gave "Take Control" positive reviews. Rolling Stone placed "Take Control" at number 98 on its list of The 100 Best Songs of the Year. Ryan Dombal of Entertainment Weekly wrote, "'Take Control' may be an ode to submission, but it hardly holds back." Tom Breihan of The Village Voice named "Take Control" the fifth best single release of the fourth quarter of 2006, commenting on "how great Amerie's joyous chirp sounds over sharp, percussive old-school funk tracks. Here, Cee-Lo laces her with spy-movie guitars and horn-stabs and a drum track that keeps building and building, adding on congas and handclaps and tambourines without ever disturbing the tense little groove at the song's center [...] and Amerie finally finds room for a bit of grit in her voice." The Guardian's Alex Macpherson wrote that the track "twitches and jerks along a nagging Tom Zé sample, but it's a song with such a sparse arrangement that interest has to be sustained entirely by the voice, which Amerie does spectacularly, making it absolutely clear who is really cracking the whip".

According to Amerie, "Some Like It" was originally chosen as the first single from Because I Love It. Following the release of similar-sounding singles by Kelis ("Bossy"), Fergie ("London Bridge") and Justin Timberlake ("SexyBack"), and because Amerie thought "Take Control" was "kind of different", the decision was made to release it as the lead single instead.

The single entered the US Billboard Hot R&B/Hip-Hop Songs chart dated December 16, 2006, at number 72 and peaked two weeks later at number 66, while failing to chart on the Billboard Hot 100. After the single's underperformance, the US release of Because I Love It was pushed back repeatedly. Elsewhere, "Take Control" peaked at number 10 on the UK Singles Chart, becoming Amerie's second highest-charting single in the United Kingdom after "1 Thing", and also reached number nine in Finland, number 19 in Norway and number 23 in Ireland.

== Music video ==
The music video was shot in late October 2006 and was premiered on the Internet on December 3. It was released to television in the United States on January 15, 2007, and was selected as MTV Jams's "Jam of the Week". Directed by Scott Franklin, it takes inspiration from Michelangelo Antonioni's 1966 film Blowup, with some of the key scenes recreated in a contemporary setting. Unlike the film, however, flashing captions onscreen make the assassination involved more obvious. Amerie and some acolytes are shown removing the photographer's blowups from his apartment, which is implied but not shown in the film. The video has a short introduction that involves Amerie singing another song from Because I Love It, "That's What U R".

Helin Jung of Entertainment Weekly called the video "nonsense, just the way I like my music videos to be" and "the stuff that music video dreams are made of [...] [it] pretends to make sense by taking on something more complex than Amerie shimmying around in hot pants and heels, but don't let it fool you. The hair tossing and strut-strutting is the same here as it is in '1 Thing', just on location this time—in a car, a park, a house with a sexy man sleeping under rumpled sheet, etc. Love it!"

== Track listings ==
- UK CD 1 and two-track digital single
- German CD single and digital download
1. "Take Control" (Main Version) – 3:44
2. "Take Control" (Karmatronic Remix) – 3:26
- UK CD 2
1. "Take Control" (Album Version) – 3:44
2. "Take Control" (Tracy's Taking Control Mix – Radio Edit) – 3:26
3. "That's What U R" (Album Version) – 3:38
4. "Take Control" (video)
- German CD maxi single
1. "Take Control" (Album Version) – 3:44
2. "Take Control" (Karmatronic Mix) – 3:26
3. "That's What U R" (Album Version) – 3:38
4. "Take Control" (video)
- French CD single and digital download
1. "Take Control" (Main Version) – 3:44
2. "Take Control" (Karmatronic Remix) – 3:26
3. "Crunk Didi (Losing U)" (featuring Willy Denzey and Six Coups MC) – 3:38
- US 12-inch single

A1. "Take Control" (Main) – 3:44
A2. "Take Control" (Instrumental) – 3:41
A3. "Take Control" (A Cappella) – 3:35
B1. "That's What U R" (Main) – 3:38

- UK 12-inch single

A1. "Take Control" (Album Version) – 3:44
A2. "Take Control" (Instrumental) – 3:41
B1. "Take Control" (Tracy's Taking Control Mix) – 3:26
B2. "Take Control" (Karmatronic Mix) – 3:26

== Credits and personnel ==
Credits are adapted from the liner notes of Because I Love It.

Recording

- Recorded at Wonderland Studios (New Jersey)
- Mixed at Larrabee North Studios (Los Angeles, California)
- Mastered at Powers Studio (Florida)

Personnel

- Amerie – vocals, additional production, vocal production, arrangement
- Mike Caren – production
- Cee-Lo Green – additional production, vocal production, arrangement
- Len Nicholson – additional production
- Cornell "Nell" Brown – recording
- Manny Marroquin – mixing
- Jared Robbins – mixing assistance
- Herb Powers Jr. – mastering

== Charts ==
=== Weekly charts ===
Chart (2006–2007)	Peak position
Europe (European Hot 100 Singles)	25
Finland (Suomen virallinen lista)	9
France (SNEP)	52
Germany (GfK)	64
Germany (Deutsche Black Charts)	6
Ireland (IRMA)	23
New Zealand (Recorded Music NZ)	40
Norway (VG-lista)	19
Scottish Singles Sales (Official Charts)	15
Slovakia Airplay (ČNS IFPI)	50
Switzerland (Schweizer Hitparade)	67
UK Singles (Official Charts)	10
UK Hip Hop/R&B (Official Charts)	5
US Hot R&B/Hip-Hop Songs (Billboard)	66

=== Year-end charts ===
Chart (2007)	Position
UK Singles (OCC)	143
UK Urban (Music Week)	12

== Release history ==
Region	Date	Format	Label	Ref.
United States	October 17, 2006	Digital download	Columbia; Sony Urban	
United States	November 28, 2006	12-inch single	Columbia; Sony Urban	
Germany	April 6, 2007	CD single; CD maxi single; digital download	Sony	
United Kingdom	April 23, 2007	Digital download	Columbia	
United Kingdom	May 5, 2007	Two-track digital single	Columbia	
United Kingdom	May 7, 2007	CD single; 12-inch single	Columbia	
France	May 28, 2007	CD single; digital download	Sony	
