= Estudando o Samba =

Studio album by Tom Zé
- Released: 1976
- Genre: MPB, samba
- Label: Continental

Estudando o Samba is a concept album by Brazilian singer Tom Zé, recorded in 1976. It was listed by the Brazilian edition of Rolling Stone as one of the 100 best Brazilian albums in history.

The album didn't receive much attention from the Brazilian press. It surveys Brazilian music's largest genre, the samba, while approaching the music with the same creativity Zé had shown with his previous album, Todos os Olhos.

While doing research about samba for his musical label Luaka Bop, David Byrne bought this album after allegedly feeling attracted to its unusual cover and reignited Tom Zé's career.

The cover is almost entirely blank, except for the album's title and Zé's name themselves and for a rope and a barbed wire which can be seen at the image's bottom. Zé wanted them to be references to both the ongoing military dictatorship in Brazil and to the strict manner in which samba was performed, with its rhythms firmly dictated by samba schools directors.

His name was purposely written with a much smaller font size than that of the album's. In a 2019 interview, he said he didn't remember the reason for the small font, but said he was probably willing to "hide" behind the album.

== Track listing ==
=== Side A ===
1. "Mã" (Tom Zé)
2. "A Felicidade" (Tom Jobim - Vinicius de Moraes)
3. "Toc" (Tom Zé)
4. "Tô" (Élton Medeiros - Tom Zé)
5. "Vai (Menina Amanhã de Manhã)" (Perna - Tom Zé)
6. "Ui! (Você Inventa)" (Odair - Tom Zé)

=== Side B ===
1. "Doi" (Tom Zé)
2. "Mãe (Mãe Solteira)" (Élton Medeiros - Tom Zé)
3. "Hein?" (Tom Zé - Vicente Barreto)
4. "Só (Solidão)" (Tom Zé)
5. "Se" (Tom Zé)
6. "Índice" (José Briamonte - Heraldo do Monte - Tom Zé)
