= Irará =

City in Bahia State, Brazil

- Municipality
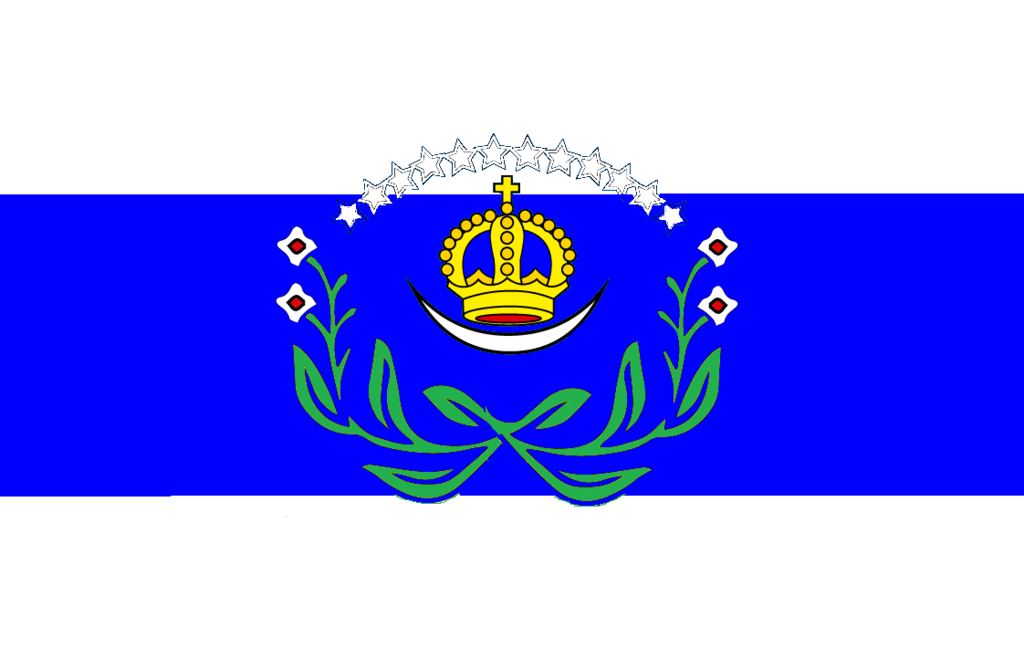
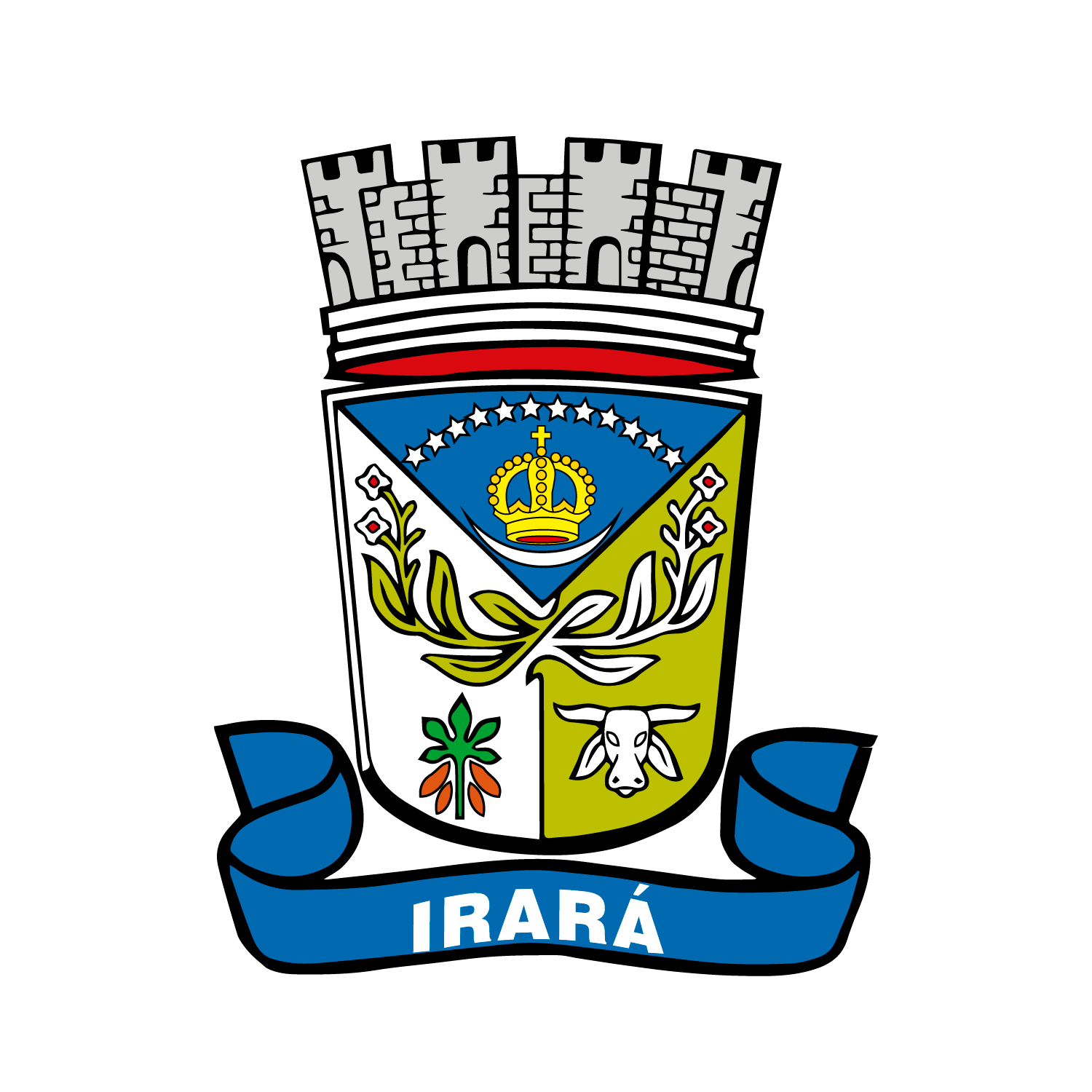
- Flag Coat of arms

- Location in Bahia

- Location in Brazil
- Coordinates: 12°02′45″S 38°45′57″W
- Country: Brazil
- Region: Northeast
- State: Bahia
- Mesoregion: Centro-Norte Baiano
- Microregion: Feira de Santana
- Founded: May 27th, 1842
- Incorporated (municipality): August 8th, 1895

Government
  - Mayor: Juscelino Souza

Area
  - Total: 267.88 km^{2} (103.43 sq mi)
- Elevation: 283 m (928 ft)

Population (2020)
  - Total: 29,173
- Time zone: UTC−3 (BRT)
- CEP postal code: 44255-000
- Area code: 75
- HDI (2010): 0,620
- Website: irara.ba.gov.br

Irará is a city in Bahia, Brazil. The municipality is the hometown of former professional footballer Dida, of A.C. Milan and Brazil national football team fame and musician Tom Zé.

Until the 17th century, the region was inhabited by the

Irará was settled by the Paiaiá, a subgroup of the Quiriris peoples. The land was annexed by the Portuguese in the 16th century, and became part of the vast land holdings of Garcia d'Ávila (1528-1609) in the Captaincy of Bahia. The Jesuits explored the area from the north via their settlement in present-day Água Fria. Bandeirantes entered the city to both hunt for precious stones in the Serra de Irará and to enslave indigenous people. Two structures remain from the bandeirantes, a church in the Vila de Bento Simões and a chapel in Caroba.

In mid-1717, the first explorations of the lands in the center of the current municipality were registered, where

Antônio Homem da Fonseca Correia was an early permanent Portuguese settler to the area. He built a chapel dedicated to Our Lady of the Conception in 1717, and left the land to his son. The farmhouse of the family gave rise to the village of Irará, which was also a site of a Paiaiá settlement.
