= In Love & War (Amerie album) =

Studio album by Amerie
- Released: November 3, 2009
- Recorded: 2008–2009
- Studios: Record Plant (Hollywood, California); Unknown locations (Miami, Florida) (Atlanta, Georgia)
- Genres: R&B; funk; hip hop; soul
- Length: 51:43
- Labels: Feenix Rising; Def Jam
- Producers: Amerie; Lenny Nicholson; The Buchanans; Warryn Campbell; Bryan-Michael Cox; Sean Garrett; Eric Hudson; Jim Jonsin; Jonas Jeberg; Karma; Rico Love; M-Phazes; Teddy Riley; TrackNova

Amerie chronology
Best 15 Things (2009)	In Love & War (2009)	Drive (2016)

Singles from In Love & War
- 1. "Why R U" Released: June 15, 2009; 2. "Heard 'Em All" Released: September 15, 2009; 3. "Pretty Brown" Released: October 20, 2009

In Love & War is the fourth studio album by American singer Amerie, released November 3, 2009, on Def Jam Recordings. Recording sessions for the album took place between 2008 and 2009 at Record Plant Studios in Hollywood, California and at other recording studios in Miami, Florida and Atlanta, Georgia. The album serves as Amerie's first release after leaving Columbia Records and forming her own label, Feenix Rising, which released the album under exclusive license and distribution through the Island Def Jam Music Group.

The album debuted at number forty-six on the US Billboard 200 chart, selling 12,500 copies in its first week. Upon its release, In Love & War received generally positive reviews from most music critics.

== Background ==
In January 2008, Entertainment Weekly reported that Amerie had left her record label, Columbia Records, and in April 2008, Amerie's name was removed from the label's roster. Recording sessions for the album took place during 2008 to 2009 at Record Plant Studios in Hollywood, California, and at other recording studios in Miami, Florida and Atlanta, Georgia. On her official Twitter account, Amerie revealed that she had been secretly recording new music in Atlanta, Georgia, and that a late summer July/August release date was in the works, with a possible first single in late May or early June.

In multiple interviews, Amerie confirmed that Rich Harrison, who had produced her previous work, would not be contributing to the album. At the end of April, Amerie revealed on Twitter that the album's title to be changed from Breakups to Makeups to In Love & War. She also announced that the album's first single is "Why R U", which she cited with "Higher" as one of two of her favorite tracks from the album.

== Music ==
Amerie has described the album's sound as "a fusion of hip hop, soul and old school rock". She spoke about the concept of In Love & War in an interview with The Green Magazine, stating:

Conceptually, I just really wanted to write about the tumultuous times of a relationship. Not so much like everything is so perfect, but looking at the more imperfect sides of love and relationships. And that’s where I came up with the title In Love & War. I also recorded a record called 'Love & War'. When I was writing it, I wasn’t really thinking about the album title, but as I was vocaling, I was just thinking 'the whole concept of love and war really encapsulates everything that I was trying to get across as far as a theme for the album.'

— Amerie

The album features collaborations with rapper Fabolous and singer Trey Songz. The latter has a guest appearance on "Pretty Brown", which samples R&B group Mint Condition's "Breakin' My Heart (Pretty Brown Eyes)" (1991). The song was produced by Australian hip hop producer M-Phazes.

== Title and artwork ==
The album was originally titled Breakups to Makeups. However, in April 2009, Amerie announced that the album's title would be In Love & War via her official Twitter account. The full-length album artwork was illustrated by David Bray and photographed by Tim Bret-Day. Album sampler EP's artwork is different from the album's. The sampler was titled Prelude to In Love & War and was released in September 2009.

== Release and promotion ==
After several delays of the album's release date in August and September, it was announced on August 13, 2009, that the album would be released November 3, 2009. Amerie had stated via her Twitter account that she was satisfied with the release date and that it has a special meaning to her. On September 27, 2009, Amerie premiered the album cover on her official Twitter page. In Love & War was released on November 3, 2009, in the United States under exclusive license by Amerie's own imprint label, Feenix Rising, which distributed it through the Island Def Jam Music Group.

Three singles were released in promotion of the album, including "Why R U" on June 15, 2009, "Heard 'Em All" on September 15, 2009, and "Pretty Brown" on October 20, 2009. Def Jam released a six-track album sampler containing snippets of "Higher", "Tell Me You Love Me", "Pretty Brown", and "Red Eye", as well full versions of "Heard 'Em All" and "Why R U", which had been remastered. Amerie performed "Heard 'em All" and "Higher" in November 2009 on Jimmy Kimmel Live!. A music video for "More Than Love" featuring Fabolous, directed by Taj was released in January 2010.

A remix version of "Heard 'em All" was released for the Asian edition of In Love & War where she collaborated with Korean girl group 4minute and rapper Junhyung of Korean boy band BEAST.

== Commercial performance ==
In the United States, In Love & War debuted at number forty-six on the U.S. Billboard 200 and at number three on the Top R&B/Hip-Hop Albums chart. By November 9, 2009, it had sold 12,421 copies in the United States, resulting in sales of 12,500 in its first week. The album also charted in the United Kingdom on the UK R&B Albums at number twenty-nine on November 15, 2009. In 2010, it peaked at number eighteen on the South Korean Gaon Albums Chart.

== Critical reception ==
Professional ratings
Review scores
Source	Rating
About.com	3.5/5 stars
AllMusic	4/5 stars
Christgau's Consumer Guide	(3-star Honorable Mention)
Entertainment Weekly	B
The Guardian	4/5 stars
Hot Press	3.5/5
Rolling Stone	3/5 stars
Slant Magazine	3.5/5 stars
USA Today	2.5/4 stars

Upon its release, the album received generally positive reviews from most music critics. At Metacritic, which assigns a normalized rating out of hundred to reviews from mainstream critics, the album received an average score of seventy-eight, based on eight reviews, which indicates "generally favorable reviews". About.com's Mark Edward Nero gave it 3½ out of five stars and called it "a hip, energetic album that properly showcases her singing talent". Alex Denney of Yahoo! Music gave In Love & War a rating of eight out of ten and lauded Amerie for her "old-skool virtues" and sound, while calling the album "an exemplary exercise in R&B songwriting and performance, brim-full of verve, spark and vigour". Hot Press writer Patrick Freyne gave the album a rating of three and a half out of five, writing "Amerie’s got the standard range and power of the production line diva but there’s also an appealingly raw, in need-of-some-Calpol-edge to her voice which gives everything that little bit more power". The Irish Times gave it three out of four stars, writing that Amerie "approaches In Love & War with much gusto".

In contrast, Steve Jones of USA Today gave the album 2½ out of four stars and expressed a mixed response towards its ballads, stating "The sassy funk numbers serve her best, while the mushy stuff only slows her down". Despite writing favorably of its uptempo tracks, Rolling Stone's Christian Hoard gave the album three out of five stars and perceived its slower material as a weakness. Boston Herald writer Lauren Carter gave In Love & War a B− rating and commended its "ambient, hip-hop-infused R&B" tracks, but wrote that "monotonous lyrics about rocky or recently ended relationships dominate the album". However, AllMusic's Andy Kellman gave the album four out of five stars and wrote favorably of its ballads, calling them "as well constructed as anything earlier in the set". In his consumer guide for MSN Music, critic Robert Christgau gave it a rating of honorable mention, indicating "an enjoyable effort consumers attuned to its overriding aesthetic or individual vision may well treasure".

== Track listing ==
In Love & War – Standard edition
No.	Title	Writer(s)	Producer(s)	Length
1.	"Tell Me You Love Me"	Amerie Mi Marie Rogers; Teddy Riley; Walter Scott; Isaiah Freeman; Julian Lowe	Riley; Scott	3:07
2.	"Heard 'Em All"	Rogers; Sean Garrett; Eric Hudson	The Pen; Hudson	3:23
3.	"Dangerous"	Rogers; Edwin Serrano; Jonas Jeberg; Damon Sharpe; Greg Lawson	Rogers; Jeberg	2:48
4.	"Higher"	Rogers; Warryn Campbell	Campbell	2:52
5.	"Why R U"	Rogers; Cedric Miller; Keith Thornton; Herb Rooney	Rogers; The Buchanans	3:17
6.	"Pretty Brown" (featuring Trey Songz)	Rogers; Serrano; Keri Lewis; Lawrence Waddell; Jeffrey Allen; Mark Landon; Stokley Williams	Rogers; M-Phazes	4:02
7.	"More Than Love" (featuring Fabolous)	Rogers; George Brown; Ronald Bell; Claydes Smith; Robert Mickens; Richard Westfield; Dennis Thomas; Robert Bell; John Jackson; Lenny Nicholson; Alton Taylor	Del Pearson; Nicholson	4:14
8.	"Swag Back"	Rogers; David Siegel; Jim Jonsin; Rico Love	Jonsin; Love	4:29
9.	"You're a Star" (Interlude)	Rogers; Nicholson	Rogers; Nicholson	1:52
10.	"Red Eye"	Rogers; Bryan-Michael Cox	Rogers; Cox	4:11
11.	"The Flowers"	Rogers; Ivan Barias; Carvin Haggins	Rogers; Karma	5:16
12.	"Different People"	Rogers; Landon	M-Phazes	3:55
13.	"Dear John"	Rogers; Nicholson; Daniel Richards; Sean Rumsey	Rogers; TrackNova	4:12
14.	"Heard 'Em All" (Remix featuring Lil Wayne) (bonus track)	Rogers; Dwayne Carter; Garrett; Hudson	Garrett; Hudson	3:56
Total length:				51:43

In Love & War – Korean edition (bonus track)
No.	Title	Writer(s)	Director(s)	Length
15.	"Heard 'Em All" (Remix featuring 4Minute and Beast)	Rogers; Dwayne Carter; Garrett; Hudson	Garrett; Hudson	3:29
Total length:				62:35

In Love & War – iTunes Store edition (bonus music videos)
No.	Title	Writer(s)	Director(s)	Length
15.	"Why R U"	Rogers; Johnson; Miller; Thornton; Rooney	Ray Kay	3:22
16.	"Heard 'Em All"	Rogers; Garrett; Hudson	Anthony Mandler	4:01
Total length:				59:06

Sample credits

- "Why R U" contains a sample of "Ego Trippin'" by Ultramagnetic MCs.
- "More Than Love" contains a sample of "Summer Madness (Live)" by Kool & the Gang.
- "Pretty Brown" contains a sample of "Breakin' My Heart (Pretty Brown Eyes)" by Mint Condition.

== Personnel ==
Credits for In Love & War adapted from liner notes.

=== Musicians ===
- Amerie – Lead vocals, producer, co-writer
- Trey Songz – featuring artist, co-writer
- Fabolous – featuring artist, co-writer
- Lil Wayne – featuring artist, co-writer
- Francesco Romano – guitar
- David Siegel – keyboards
- Sean Windsor – guitar
- Larry Sommerville – keyboards
- She McElroy- background vocals, co-writer

=== Production ===
- Karma – producer
- Eric Hudson – producer
- L.A. Reid – executive producer
- Teddy Riley – producer, engineer
- J. Peter Robinson – art direction
- Delroy Pearson – producer
- Deborah Mannis-Gardner – sample clearance
- Vernon Mungo – engineer
- James M. Wisner – engineer
- Warryn Campbell – producer
- Chris Atlas – marketing
- Walter "Mucho" Scott – producer
- Cornell Brown – engineer
- Mike Houge – engineer
- Bryan-Michael Cox – producer
- Jim Jonsin – producer
- Bruce Buechner – engineer
- Amy Neiman – photo coordination
- Lenny "Linen" Nicholson – producer, executive producer, management
- Sam Thomas – engineer
- Tim Bret Day – art direction
- Herb Power Jr. – mastering
- Sean Garrett – producer
- Victor Abijaudi – engineer
- Rico Love – producer
- Miles Walker – engineer
- Mark "Exit" Goodchild – engineer
- Jordan "DJ Swivel" Young – engineer
- Jonas Jeberg – producer
- Graham Marsh – engineer
- David Bray – art direction, illustrations
- Daniel "2Dark" Richards – instrumentation
- Lee Stuart – art direction

== Charts ==
Chart performance for In Love & War
Chart (2009–2010)	Peak position
Japanese Albums (Oricon)	89
South Korean Albums (Gaon)	4
South Korean International Albums (Gaon)	1
UK R&B Albums (Official Charts)	29
US Billboard 200 (Billboard)	46
US Top R&B/Hip-Hop Albums (Billboard)	3

== Release history ==
List of release dates, showing region, edition, record label(s), format(s), catalog number and reference(s).
Region	Date	Edition	Label(s)	Format(s)	Catalog	Ref.
Various	September 16, 2009	Album sampler	Def Jam	CD	REV1 10021	
United States	November 3, 2009	Standard	Feeniix Rising; Def Jam	CD; digital download	B001322502	
Germany	November 6, 2009	Standard	Universal Music	CD; digital download	06025271133645	
United Kingdom	November 9, 2009	Standard	Island; Mercury	CD; digital download	06025271133645	
Canada	November 10, 2009	Standard	Universal Music	CD; digital download	B002DSM8TS	
Japan	November 11, 2009	Standard	Universal Music	CD; digital download	UICD 6166	
Poland	November 12, 2009	Standard	Universal Music	CD; digital download	06025271133645	
Hong Kong	November 20, 2009	Standard	Universal Music	CD; digital download	—N/a	
