= 4AM Mulholland =

EP by Amerie
- Released: October 19, 2018
- Genre: Alternative R&B, neo soul
- Length: 22:44
- Label: Feeniix Rising
- Producer: Animal

Amerie chronology
Drive (2016)	4AM Mulholland (2018)	After 4AM (2018)

Singles from 4AM Mulholland
- 1. "Curious" Released: 23 January 2019; 2. "A Heart's for the Breaking" Released: 19 April 2019

4AM Mulholland is the second extended play (EP) by American R&B singer Amerie, released on October 19, 2018, through Feeniix Rising Entertainment. It was released along with its sister EP, After 4AM. The EPs have been called a "two-sided concept album draped in late-night vibes and musings on love".

== Background and recording ==
Together, the two EPs are considered Amerie's first album in nine years. Amerie had complete creative control over the project, as she wrote, recorded, mixed and engineered the songs herself. She stated that along with being "creatively freeing", "Everything on the album was recorded from when I didn't know I was pregnant to eight, nine months [along]". Amerie also said that she "didn't want the album to be a smorgasbord of sound, it needs to have a vibe and that's why there's two projects".

== Critical reception ==
Professional ratings
Review scores
Source	Rating
Pitchfork	7.2/10

Maura Johnston of Pitchfork said the EPs "fuse Amerie's thoughtful craft to R&B's current wave and reveal more pleasure with each listen". Johnston acclaimed Amerie's vocal range on the tracks "Curious" and "A Heart's for the Breaking", and summarized that "On first listen, the sprawl of sound takes center stage as it does on so much modern mood music. Listen closer, though, and Amerie's thoughtful songwriting, detailed production, and muscular voice—which, even when heavily filtered, has the same commanding presence that made her earlier singles leap from the speakers—add detail and shape."

Jeff Benjamin of Billboard wrote that the content of the EPs "pivots from her pop-leaning past hits into a deep dive of more subdued, cavernous R&B and trance-laced productions". Benjamin felt that "Curious" sets a "moody, mysterious tone", and called "A Heart's for the Breaking" a "snappy, trap-heavy cut".

== Track listing ==
All lyrics are written by Amerie Nicholson and Pierre Heath. All music is composed by Heath.

No.	Title	Length
1.	"Curious"	3:24
2.	"Amnesia"	2:58
3.	"Not a Love Song"	2:30
4.	"The Wall"	2:32
5.	"4AM Mulholland"	3:47
6.	"A Heart's for the Breaking"	3:46
7.	"See Me Cry (A Lover's Lament)"	3:47
Total length:		22:44
