= Mine (Amerie song) =

Single by Amerie
- Released: March 28, 2025
- Length: 2:51
- Label: Amerie Inc.
- Songwriters: Amerie Rogers; Troy Taylor
- Producer: Troy Taylor

Amerie singles chronology
"Blood Stain 2" (2023)	"Mine" (2025)

"Mine" is a single by American singer and songwriter Amerie, independently released on March 28, 2025, by Amerie's own label, Amerie Inc. The single is Amerie's first release as a lead artist since 2019's "A Heart's for the Breaking".

== Background and release ==
In November 2024, Amerie announced a forthcoming studio album would be released in 2025. On March 28, 2025, she released the single "Mine". "Mine" is expected to be a single from the singer's forthcoming sixth studio album; Amerie shared, "I wanted the album to soundtrack a great love. I wanted the album to feel like what it is to be in love or make a person who isn’t want to be fully and completely in love".
