= After 4AM =

EP by Amerie
- Released: October 19, 2018
- Genre: R&B
- Length: 20:43
- Label: Feeniix Rising

Amerie chronology
4AM Mulholland (2018)	After 4AM (2018)

After 4AM is the third extended play (EP) by American R&B singer Amerie, released on October 19, 2018, through Feeniix Rising Entertainment. It was released along with its sister EP, 4AM Mulholland. The EPs have been called a "two-sided concept album draped in late-night vibes and musings on love".

== Background and recording ==
Along with 4AM Mulholland, the EPs make up Amerie's first proper album in nine years. Amerie had complete creative control over the project, as she wrote, recorded and engineered the songs herself, all while not knowing, then discovering that she was pregnant. She called making the EPs "creatively freeing", and stated on separating the project into two: "I love my projects to be very sonically cohesive. As I was recording, I wasn't trying to limit myself in any way, I was feeling very, very creative -- I had just came off of writing a new story and I wanted to go full-out into the recording process."

== Critical reception ==
Professional ratings
Review scores
Source	Rating
Pitchfork	7.6/10

Maura Johnston of Pitchfork said the EPs "fuse Amerie's thoughtful craft to R&B's current wave and reveal more pleasure with each listen", and gave After 4AM a slightly higher score of 7.6 over its sister EP's 7.2. Johnston acclaimed the production on After 4AM moreso than 4AM Mulholland, calling "4The Lovers" the beginning of the "stronger backbone" of the second half of songs with its "piston-like instrumental". Johnston compared "Give It All Up" to the "strut" of the "similarly gloom-stricken" "Why R U", but said "its layers of strings and piano hint at extra drama", and also judged that there is "throwback action" on the EP, with "the rubbery synths that acted as the fulcrum for the 2008 Ne-Yo smash 'Miss Independent' and its mid-2000s radio counterparts spangl[ing] the surface of 'Midnight Rain,' while the swaying rhythms of the gentle ballad 'I Remember Us' update the strummy R&B-pop of Stargate."

Jeff Benjamin of Billboard judged that the content of the EPs "pivots from her pop-leaning past hits into a deep dive of more subdued, cavernous R&B and trance-laced productions". Benjamin called opening track "4The Lovers" a "snappy, trap-heavy cut", and "Give It All Up" and "I Remember Us" "deliver a pang of nostalgia with flecks of jittery pop and boom bap".

== Track listing ==
No.	Title	Writer(s)	Producer(s)	Length
1.	"4The Lovers"	Amerie Nicholson; Ricky Wigginton Jr.	Amerie; Len Nicholson; Wigginton	3:30
2.	"Give It All Up"	A. Nicholson; Mathew Jenkins	Amerie; L. Nicholson; Jenkins	4:01
3.	"Midnight Rain"	A. Nicholson; Jenkins	Jenkins	2:50
4.	"Don't Say a Word"	A. Nicholson; Pierre Heath	Amerie; L. Nicholson; Animal	3:18
5.	"I Remember Us"	A. Nicholson; Jenkins	Amerie; L. Nicholson; Jenkins; Feenix Rising	3:33
6.	"Just Sayin'"	A. Nicholson; Jenkins	Amerie; L. Nicholson; Jenkins; Feenix Rising	3:31
Total length:				20:43
