= Gotta Work =

Single by Amerie

from the album Because I Love It
- Released: April 14, 2007
- Recorded: 2006
- Studio: Wonderland Studios (New Jersey)
- Genre: R&B; funk
- Length: 3:10
- Label: Columbia
- Songwriters: Amerie Mi Marie, Rich Shelton, Loren Hill, Kevin Veney, Isaac Hayes, David Porter
- Producer: One Up

Amerie singles chronology
"Take Control" (2006)	"Gotta Work" (2007)	"Fly Like Me" (2007)

"Gotta Work" is a song by American R&B singer-songwriter Amerie, and is the second international single from her third studio album, Because I Love It (2007). It samples Sam & Dave's 1966 song "Hold On, I'm Comin'", written by Isaac Hayes and David Porter and originally recorded by Reuben Wilson. The sample used is from a cover version by Erma Franklin, from her album 'Soul Sister' (1969). Amerie called the sound of the song "'go-go soul'", saying go-go "[is] like really strong black coffee, some people can't ingest it in its purest form."

This song is featured at the end of the 2009 action film Fighting.

The music video was premiered on June 30, 2007. The video was directed by Scott Franklin.

== Critical reception ==
Blues and Soul Magazine said the song "sounds like it's come from the same factory of hits as most of B's output ... 'Crazy in Love' meets 'One Thing' [sic]", but that it "treads that rare fine ground between club-friendly sing-a-long anthem and credible soulful territory; its bold and brassy orchestral instrumentation and clattering percussion pushing it along nicely. The first single from the new album, Because I Love It, and we're loving it." The Village Voice named it the sixth best single of summer 2007. The Daily Mirror wrote, "An old superpowered Stax riff will never let you down and there's a particularly supercharged one at the centre of ["Gotta Work"] ... Amerie sweats and grinds in the funk engine room, whipping up a lather and doing the song she has sampled a service. Get your back into it, just like she does, and the benefits can be instantly felt."

"Gotta Work" was ranked number seventy-one on MTV Asia's list of Top 100 Hits of 2007.

"Gotta Work was used as the closing credits for ITV F1's 2007 Formula One montage.

== Track listings and formats ==
UK CD single

1. "Gotta Work"
2. "Gotta Work" (Remix featuring Collie Buddz)

CD single (Premium)

1. "Gotta Work"
2. "Gotta Work" (Remix featuring Collie Buddz)
3. "1 Thing" (Remix featuring Eve)
4. "Gotta Work" (Video)

UK 12" single

1. "Gotta Work" (Album Version)
2. "Gotta Work" (Instrumental Version)

== Charts ==
Chart (2007)	Peak position
Europe (European Hot 100 Singles)	69
Germany (Deutsche Black Charts)	6
Ireland (IRMA)	30
Scottish Singles Sales (Official Charts)	19
UK Singles (Official Charts)	21
UK Hip Hop/R&B (Official Charts)	6
