= Why R U =

Single by Amerie

from the album In Love & War
- Released: June 15, 2009
- Recorded: 2009
- Length: 3:18
- Label: Def Jam
- Songwriters: Cedric Miller; Amerie; Herbert Rooney; Keith Thornton
- Producer: The Buchanans

Amerie singles chronology
"Fly Like Me" (2007)	"Why R U" (2009)	"Heard 'em All" (2009)

Audio sample
- file; help

"Why R U" is a song by American R&B singer Amerie. The song was recorded for her fourth studio album, In Love & War, and serves as the lead single from the album. The song contains excerpts of Ultramagnetic MCs' "Ego Trippin'". The song is also Amerie's first single under the Island Def Jam Music Group.

== Background ==
The song samples Ultramagnetic MCs' "Ego Trippin" from their 1988 release Critical Beatdown (which also samples Melvin Bliss' "Synthetic Substitution"). An official remix premiered on Hot 97 on July 21, it features Nas, Jadakiss, Rick Ross and Kain. The remix samples Whodini's "One Love."

Amerie spoke about "Why R U" in an interview with The Green Magazine : "I wrote the song when I was riding in a car. It was a really rainy day in New York. I always love to start out, if I can, recording in New York. Sometimes I’ll record the entire time there. This is the first time I didn’t record the majority of the album in New York, so I was kind of curious as to how things would come out. The song to me felt like a greater representation of who I am as an artist. Even when I was writing it I just felt like it was a special record. I wasn’t really thinking in terms of singles or not. I just knew that ideally if people could hear anything from me first since it’s been a few years, this was the record to me that would best show who I am right now."

== Music video ==
The video for "Why R U" was shot during the second week of May 2009 in Los Angeles with director Ray Kay. Amerie's idea behind the video, "I wanted to go with something really abstract but not too far out there, something that would look graphic." The video premiered on 106 & Park on BET on June 8. The video ranked at number 90 on BET's Notarized: Top 100 Videos of 2009 countdown.

== Charts ==
Chart performance for "Why R U"
Chart (2009)	Peak position
Germany (Deutsche Black Charts)	13
Japan (Japan Hot 100)	85
US Hot R&B/Hip-Hop Songs (Billboard)	55

== Release history ==
Release history for "Why R U"
Country	Release date	Format	Label
United States	June 15, 2009	Airplay, digital download	Def Jam
United Kingdom	September 21, 2009	CD single	Def Jam
