= Amerie =

American singer (born 1980)

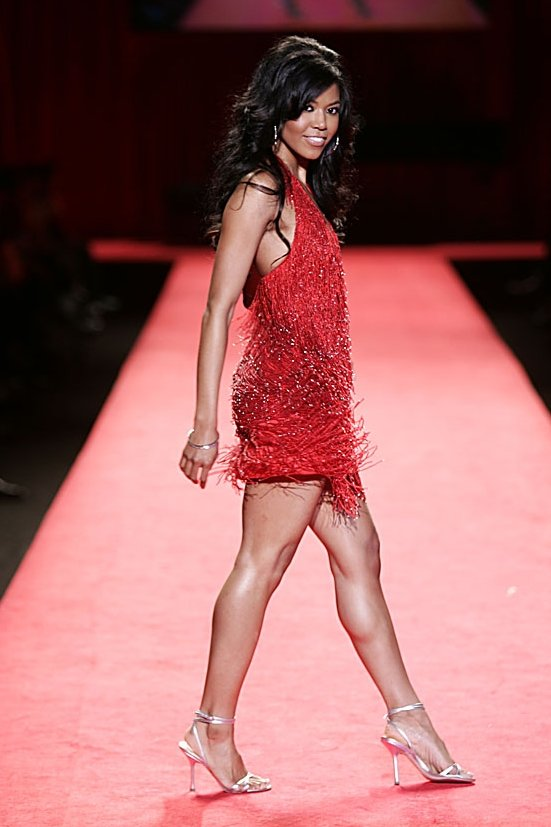
- Amerie in 2006

Background information
- Born: Amerie Mi Marie Rogers; January 12, 1980 (age 46); Fitchburg, Massachusetts, U.S.
- Origin: Washington, D.C., U.S.
- Genres: R&B; pop; hip hop; soul; go-go
- Occupations: Singer; songwriter; actress; writer
- Works: Amerie discography
- Years active: 2001–present
- Labels: Columbia; Feeniix Rising; Def Jam
- Website: amerie.co

Amerie Mi Marie Rogers Nicholson (born January 12, 1980) is an American singer, songwriter, actress, and writer. She has released four studio albums to date: All I Have (2002), Touch (2005), Because I Love It (2007), In Love & War (2009). She is best known for her 2005 single "1 Thing".

== Early life and education ==
Rogers was born in Fitchburg, Massachusetts, to a Korean mother named Mi Suk and a Black American father, Charles Rogers. A few months after she was born, the Rogers family moved to South Korea, where Amerie lived for three years. Her father was a chief warrant officer in the U.S. military, so the family lived in many different places, including Alaska, Texas, Virginia and Germany. She has a younger sister, Angela Rogers, who is now her lawyer.

Amerie has described her parents as conservative, protective, traditional Christians. Growing up, she and her sister were forbidden to leave the house or use the phone on school days. The singer enrolled at Georgetown University to study literature, and was in Navy ROTC: "My dad didn't force me into it or anything. I joined so I could afford an education." She quit ROTC after her sophomore year and graduated with a B.A. in English and a Fine Arts minor in design.

While studying at Georgetown, Amerie befriended a Washington, D.C., club promoter who eventually put her in touch with producer Rich Harrison. During an interview with Maxim Magazine, Amerie said she agreed to meet up with Rich at a public location because she did not know Rich. The chosen location was a McDonald's parking lot, where Rich played his tracks and Amerie sang along.

Harrison, who had just worked on Mary J. Blige's albums Mary and No More Drama, began recording and developing demos with Amerie. This led to her first record deal with Columbia Records. According to Amerie, she and Harrison immediately hit it off. In a 2002 Interview with Hip Online, she said: "For some reason we had a very special chemistry. When we would work together something great would happen."

== Career ==
=== 2001–2003: All I Have ===
Amerie recorded the chorus for the 2001 single "Rule", performed by Nas. The single peaked at number 67 on the Hot R&B/Hip-Hop Singles & Tracks chart in the United States. She recorded a song with Detroit rapper Royce da 5'9", titled "Life", the third and final single from his album Rock City (Version 2.0). In 2002, her debut single, "Why Don't We Fall in Love", was released and peaked at number 23 on the Billboard Hot 100, becoming a top ten hit on the Hot R&B/Hip-Hop Songs and Hot Dance Club Play charts. The song was an urban top-20 hit in Australia and reached the top 40 in the UK.

Amerie's debut album, All I Have (produced and co-written in its entirety by Rich Harrison), was released in 2002 to generally positive reviews. It peaked at number nine on the U.S. Billboard 200 selling 89,000 copies in its first week of release; the album has since been certified gold by the RIAA and had sold 657,000 copies by 2009, according to Nielsen SoundScan. To promote the album, Amerie went on tour with Usher and Nas—on the former's Evolution 8701 Tour—and with rapper Nelly. The second and final single from All I Have was "Talkin' to Me", a top-20 entry on the Hot R&B/Hip-Hop Songs, although it peaked outside the top 40 on the Billboard Hot 100.

In 2003, Amerie won the Soul Train Music Award for Best New Artist and was also nominated for Best R&B/Soul Album (All I Have) and Best R&B Soul Single – Female ("Why Don't We Fall in Love"). She received a BET Award nomination for Best Female R&B Artist and an Image Award nomination for Outstanding New Artist. Amerie lent her vocals to the LL Cool J song "Paradise", which reached number 14 on the Hot R&B/Hip-Hop Songs and became the singer's second top-40 Hot 100 entry. She was featured on DJ Kayslay's "Too Much for Me", on his 2003 album The Streetsweeper Vol. 1, which peaked at number 53 on the Hot R&B/Hip-Hop Songs. Amerie appeared on Bow Wow's third album, Unleashed, singing the hook on the song "To My Mama". She was also featured on the Rodney Jerkins-produced track "When I Think of You" from the soundtrack to the Jessica Alba dance film Honey.

=== 2004–2005: Touch ===
Amerie gained additional recognition from her first acting role, in the 2004 film First Daughter (directed by Forest Whitaker), in which she starred alongside Katie Holmes. Also in 2004, she began working on her second album, Touch. As with All I Have, the album was co-written and produced by friend Rich Harrison, who contributed seven new tracks to the record; additional production came from Lil Jon, Bryce Wilson, Red Spyda, and Dre & Vidal. Unlike her first album, Amerie co-wrote every track but one, "Come with Me", which Harrison wrote. She assumed more creative control over the visual imagery accompanying the album, such as videos and artwork—"I feel like when you do a record, you have a vision in your mind and you want to carry it across and it doesn't end with the studio", she has said.

In 2005, Amerie released the album's lead single, "1 Thing". The dance-pop song, which sampled The Meters's 1960s funk recording "Oh, Calcutta!", became Amerie's biggest hit to date. In the United States, it reached number eight on the Billboard Hot 100 and topped the Hot R&B/Hip-Hop Songs chart. The RIAA certified the single gold. The song was a top-five hit in the UK, where it became one of the year's best-selling singles, and attained top-ten and top-twenty positions across Continental Europe.

Touch was released in 2005 and peaked at number five on the Billboard 200, selling 124,000 copies in its first week. The album was certified gold by the RIAA, having sold 406,000 copies in the United States as of 2009. The album's title track, "Touch", was released as the second single and peaked at number 95 on the Hot R&B/Hip-Hop Songs chart in the United States, although it was a top-20 entry in the UK. A third single, "Talkin' About", was released in America only; an official music video was planned but eventually scrapped. Later in 2005, Amerie was featured alongside Fat Joe on "I Don't Care", the lead single from Ricky Martin's album Life. The single entered the top 20 in several European countries and Australia.

The success of "1 Thing" and Touch led to two Grammy Award nominations for Amerie in 2006: Best Female R&B Vocal Performance (for "1 Thing"), and Best Contemporary R&B Album (for Touch). "1 Thing" earned nominations at the MTV Video Music Awards—for Best Female Video and Best Choreography—and Soul Train Lady of Soul Awards— for Best R&B/Soul Single, Solo; R&B/Soul or Rap Song of the Year; Best R&B/Soul or Rap Music Video; and Best R&B/Soul or Rap Dance Cut. At the 2005 VIBE Awards, Amerie won Club Banger of the Year for her hit. "1 Thing" was adapted into a variety of remixes by rappers such as Eve, Fabolous, and Jay-Z. In 2009, "1 Thing" was sixth on The Root's list of Top 10 Hip-Hop/R&B Songs of the 2000s.

=== 2006–2007: Because I Love It ===
In 2006, Amerie returned to the studio to work on her third album, Because I Love It, with producers such as The Buchanans, One Up, and Mike Caren. The album was her first not to feature writing and production from producer Rich Harrison. She cited music of the 1980s as a major influence on the album, saying "I love 80s music period! That's why I did Because I Love It, since it had mostly R&B, soul, and 80s new wave. When I said I wanted to do that in 2006, people were like, 'what?!' [...] but I love it."

Because I Love It's first single, "Take Control", (co-produced by Mike Caren and co-written by Cee-Lo Green), became a top-10 hit in the UK in 2007. Because I Love It was released in 2007 in Europe, Asia, and Australasia and reached the top 20 in the UK, where the album's second single, "Gotta Work", peaked at number 21. The album has been certified silver by the BPI. During 2007, the impending U.S. release of Because I Love It made Blender magazine's list of "25 Reasons to Love '07". The official release date was delayed several times and the singles "Take Control" and "Gotta Work" were given little promotion (with the former peaking at number 66 on the Hot R&B/Hip-Hop Songs chart). Amerie spoke of her difficulties with Columbia Records in a late 2007 interview, stating that the label was not promoting Because I Love It adequately.

=== 2008–2010: In Love & War ===
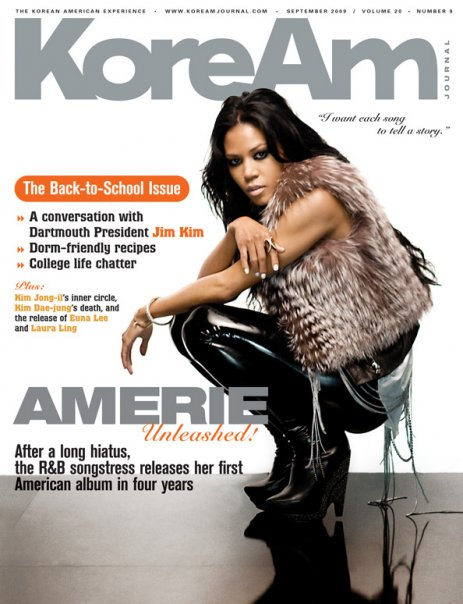
Amerie on the cover of KoreAm (September 2009)

In 2008, Amerie announced she had signed a label/production deal through the Island Def Jam Music Group, which allowed her to release her music under her own label, Feenix Rising. Later that year, Columbia Records released the compilation album Playlist: The Very Best of Amerie; in 2009, the label released a second compilation album, Best 15 Things, in Japan only.

Amerie described her fourth album, In Love & War, as "a fusion of hip-hop, soul, and rock" with elements of music of the 1970s, and "a direct extension of my first album [All I Have]". The album's lead single, "Why R U", reached number 55 on the Billboard Hot R&B/Hip-Hop Songs chart in the U.S. "Heard 'Em All", which featured rapper Lil Wayne, peaked at number 81 on the same chart; it did, however, enter the top 10 on the Korean pop charts. With little radio support—the third single, "Pretty Brown" (featuring Trey Songz), was released only two weeks before the album—and hindered by distribution problems, In Love & War peaked at number 46 on the Billboard 200 and at number three on the Top R&B/Hip-Hop Albums.

In 2010, Amerie announced that she had changed the spelling of her stage name to Ameriie, explaining: "I operate on vibes and intuition, and I believe everything is energy; the vibration of the double I is right for me. Slightly different spelling, completely same pronunciation!" Later that year, she premiered a new song titled "Outside Your Body".

=== 2011–2023: Cymatika trilogy, 4AM Mulholland, After 4AM and literature career ===
In 2011, it was reported that Amerie was in the studio working on her fifth studio album, titled Cymatika Vol. 1. The album's title is based on the word cymatics, the study of visible sound and vibration. The production lineup consisted of Riley Urick, The Buchanans, and Andre Harris (of Dre & Vidal), among others; Amerie said that she may reunite with Rich Harrison for the project but that it would be "a matter of when and in what way." Cymatika Vol. 1 was also to include special guest appearances from Drunken Tiger's Tiger JK and Tasha Reid. According to Amerie, Cymatika would explore freedom, androgyny, and the New world order, and was influenced by trance music, electronica, house music, and New wave music. Second and third volumes of Cymatika were planned.

In 2012, Amerie announced a forthcoming "mini-LP" titled The Prelude. In 2013, she stated that she had been working on a new project, Because I Love It Vol. II, a follow-up to her 2007 album. She said this album, BILI, stemmed from songs that did not fit sonically or thematically onto Cymatika—"songs that are heavy in percussion, but have a very aggressive, soulful element to them. They don't exist in any one time, or sound of the moment". BILI and Cymatika were both slated for release in 2015. A single, "What I Want" (which samples "Apache" by Incredible Bongo Band), was released from BILI in 2014. Later in 2014, she premiered the track "Mustang" and announced a UK tour for 2015. In 2015, Amerie collaborated with producer Rich Harrison on a new single, "Out Loud".

In 2016, Amerie appeared on the radio show The Breakfast Club, 105.1 and announced an EP titled Drive, a second untitled EP due later in the year, and that she was still at work on her album Cymatika (which was to be part of a trilogy). Drive was initially released on the streaming service SoundCloud. In 2017, Amerie released the single "REDRUM", which was set to be featured on an upcoming album titled MA3.

In 2018, Amerie simultaneously released two albums, 4AM Mulholland and After 4AM; this was her first full-length album since 2009 and her second independent release (following Drive). In 2019, she performed alongside Nelly and Craig David at R'n'B Vine Days, a one-day music festival in Australia.

In August 2022, it was announced that Amerie had written a children's picture book, You Will Do Great Things, it was published by Macmillan in March 2023.

=== 2024–present: New music ===
In November 2024, Amerie announced a forthcoming studio album would be released in 2025. On March 28, 2025, she released the single "Mine".

== Artistry ==
Since the start of her career, Amerie has been heavily involved within the creative process of her music, receiving not only writing credits but production and instrumentation credits as well. Amerie is a soprano.

In an interview with Myplay.com, she described her early process of recording music: "I used to record songs that I wrote by using two different tape recorders and two separate tapes. I would start by recording myself on the first tape, singing the song down from top to finish. Then, I would play it back, while singing the harmonies and recording them on the second tape. I'd just keep repeating the process, going back and forth between tapes until I had a final version of the full song on one tape, with stacked harmonies, backgrounds and everything!".

Amerie listed diverse musical influences in a 2014 interview, including the musical Grease, Motown era soul music, late 1960s rock and roll, Heavy metal music, 1980s pop music and new wave music, music of Germany, Korean traditional music, R&B, and hip hop music. She cited film score as an inspiration, describing them as "that very surround-sound, immersive experience". She also cited late singer and actress Aaliyah as inspiration on her vocals and dancing. She also revealed that Carl Thomas's 2000 album Emotional influenced her debut album All I Have.

While she almost exclusively releases English-language songs, Amerie has recorded with Korean artists such as 4minute on "Heard 'em All", a performance of which aired on KBS and Mnet.

== Other projects ==
In 2003, Amerie was the presenter of the BET teen/youth lifestyle series The Center, which she also helped to develop. In 2004, Amerie earned her first acting role, portraying the role of Mia Thompson, a college student who rooms with the president's daughter, in the film First Daughter, alongside Katie Holmes.

In 2014, Amerie launched a YouTube video blog titled "Books Beauty Amerie" and said that she was writing two novels, one young adult and one fantasy.

In 2017, Amerie published an anthology book via Bloomsbury Publishing titled Because You Love to Hate Me and a sci-fi trilogy novel series.

In 2019, Amerie started her own Book Club, "Amerie's Book Club" where she highlights diverse and unique perspectives and voices.

In 2019, Amerie performed on tour with other artists such as Ashanti, Keri Hilson, and Monica for the Femme It Forward movement.

== Personal life ==
In 2007, Amerie began dating her manager, Sony Music executive Lenny Nicholson. It was officially announced that Amerie and Nicholson were engaged on February 27, 2010, and the couple married on June 25, 2011, in an oceanfront ceremony in Anguilla. She now goes by Amerie Nicholson or Amerie Rogers Nicholson. On May 15, 2018, she gave birth to the couple's first child, a son. On June 16, 2025, she announced her divorce from Lenny Nicholson.

== Discography ==
Studio albums

- All I Have (2002)
- Touch (2005)
- Because I Love It (2007)
- In Love & War (2009)

== Filmography ==
Film and television roles
Year	Title	Role	Notes
2003	The Center	Herself / Hostess	
2004	First Daughter	Mia Thompson	

== Bibliography ==
Books

- Because You Love to Hate Me: 13 Tales of Villainy (contributing writer and editor - 2017)
- Behind the Song (contributing writer - 2017)
- A Phoenix First Must Burn (contributing writer - 2020)
- Cool. Awkward. Black. (contributing writer - 2023)
- You Will Do Great Things (author - 2023)
- Black Girl Power (contributing writer - 2024)
- This Is Not a Ghost Story (author - 2025)

== Awards and nominations ==
Year	Awards	Work	Category	Result
2003	NAACP Image Awards	Herself	NAACP Image Award for Outstanding New Artist	Nominated
2003	BET Awards	Herself	Best Female R&B Artist	Nominated
2003	Billboard Music Awards	Herself	Best New R&B/Hip Hop Artist	Nominated
2003	Billboard Music Awards	Herself	Best Female R&B Hip Hop Artist	Nominated
2003	Soul Train Music Awards	Herself	Best R&B/Soul or Rap New Artist	Won
2003	Soul Train Music Awards	All I Have	Best R&B/Soul Album – Female	Nominated
2003	Soul Train Music Awards	"Why Don't We Fall in Love"	Best R&B Soul Single – Female	Nominated
2004	Black Reel Awards	"Paradise" (LL Cool J feat. Amerie)	Black Reel Award for Best Original or Adapted Song	Nominated
2005	MTV Video Music Awards	"1 Thing"	Best Female Video	Nominated
2005	MTV Video Music Awards	"1 Thing"	Best Choreography	Nominated
2005	Billboard Music Awards	"1 Thing"	Top Soundtrack Single	Nominated
2005	Teen Choice Awards	Herself	Choice Female Breakout Artist	Nominated
2005	Teen Choice Awards	"1 Thing"	Choice R&B/Hip-Hop Track	Nominated
2005	BET Awards	"1 Thing"	Video of the Year	Nominated
2005	BET Awards	Herself	Best Female R&B Artist	Nominated
2005	Soul Train Lady of Soul Awards	Herself	Aretha Franklin Award for Entertainer of the Year	Won
2005	Music Television Awards	Herself	Best New Act	Nominated
2005	MOBO Awards	" 1 Thing"	Best Single	Nominated
2005	Vibe Awards	" 1 Thing"	Club Banger of the Year	Won
2006	Grammy Awards	Touch	Best Contemporary R&B Album	Nominated
2006	Grammy Awards	"1 Thing"	Best R&B Female Vocal Performance	Nominated
2006	People's Choice Awards	"1 Thing"	Favorite Song From a Movie	Nominated
2006	MTV Video Music Awards Japan	"1 Thing"	Best Video from a Film	Nominated
2007	MOBO Awards	"Take Control"	Best Song	Nominated
2007	Virgin Media Music Awards	Herself	Most Fanciable Female	Nominated
2009	Rober Awards Music Poll	Herself	Best R&B/Soul	Nominated
