= Tom Zé =

Brazilian singer-songwriter

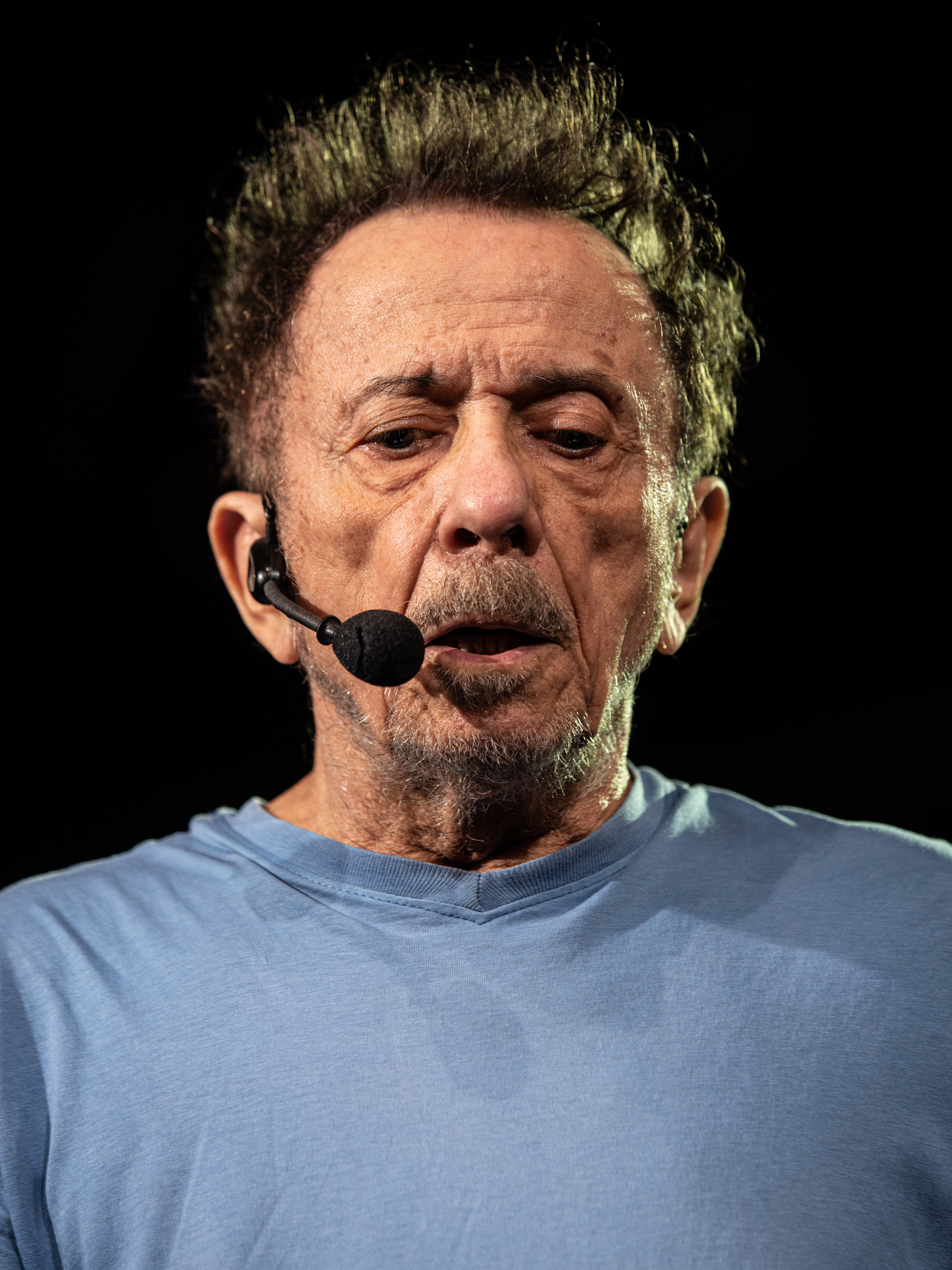
- Tom Zé in 2019

Background information
- Born: Antônio José Santana Martins; 11 October 1936 (age 90); Irará, Bahia, Brazil
- Origin: São Paulo, Brazil
- Genres: MPB; samba; folk; world music; experimental; tropicália
- Occupations: Multi-instrumentalist; singer-songwriter; composer
- Years active: 1960s–present
- Labels: Trama Records; Luaka Bop
- Website: tomze.com.br

Antônio José Santana Martins (born 11 October 1936), known professionally as Tom Zé (Portuguese pronunciation: [ˈtõ ˈzɛ]), born in Irará, Bahia, is a Brazilian singer-songwriter, multi-instrumentalist, and composer who was influential in the Tropicália movement of 1960s Brazil. After the peak of the Tropicália period, Zé went into relative obscurity: it was only in the 1990s, when musician and Luaka Bop label head David Byrne discovered Zé's 1975 album Estudando o Samba and then released reissues of his work, that Zé returned to performing and releasing new material.

== Early life and career ==
Tom Zé grew up in the small town of Irará, Bahia in the dry sertão region of the country's Northeast. He would later claim that his hometown was "pre-Gutenbergian", as information was primarily transferred through oral communication. As a child, he was influenced by Brazilian musicians such as Luiz Gonzaga and Jackson do Pandeiro. Zé became interested in music by listening to the radio, and moved to the state capital of Salvador to pursue a degree. He later relocated to São Paulo and began his career in popular music there.

== Career ==
Much of his early work involved his wry impressions of the massive metropolitan area, coming as he did, from a small town in the relatively poor northeast.

Influential in the Tropicália movement, Zé contributed, along with Caetano Veloso, Gilberto Gil, Gal Costa, Os Mutantes, and Nara Leão, to the watershed Tropicália album/manifesto Tropicália: ou Panis et Circenses (1968). He also participated in a series of concerts with the musicians. After the Brazilian military government of the 1960s began to crack down on the musicians of Tropicália, Zé moved out of the public eye and began to experiment with novel instruments and composition styles. While the other major figures of Tropicália would go on to great commercial and critical success in later decades, Zé slipped into obscurity in the 1970s and 1980s.

== Re-emergence ==
In the early 1990s, Zé's work experienced a revival when American musician David Byrne discovered one of his albums, Estudando o Samba (1976), on a visit to Rio de Janeiro. Zé was the first artist signed to the Luaka Bop label and has so far released a compilation and two albums, all of which received positive reviews from critics in the United States.

In 2011, he collaborated with Javelin on the song "Ogodô, Ano 2000" for the Red Hot Organization's most recent charitable album Red Hot+Rio 2. The album is a follow-up to the 1996 Red Hot + Rio. Proceeds from the sales will be donated to raise awareness and money to fight AIDS, HIV and related health and social issues.

== Style ==
Remaining true to the experimental and Dada impulses of Tropicália, Zé has been noted for both his unorthodox approach to melody and instrumentation, employing various objects as instruments such as the typewriter. He has collaborated with many of the concrete poets of São Paulo, including Augusto de Campos, and employed concrete techniques in his lyrics. Musically, his work appropriates samba, Bossa Nova, Brazilian folk music, forró, and American rock and roll, among others. He has been praised by avant-garde composers for his use of dissonance, polytonality, and unusual time signatures. Because of the experimental nature of many of his compositions, Zé has been compared with American musicians such as Frank Zappa and Captain Beefheart.

One of his last efforts, though, has been a return to Bossa Nova, his Estudando a Bossa – Nordeste Plaza. Says Zé: "That music has inhabited my psyche for 50 to 60 years. Familiar and profound, yet somehow extraterrestrial in my mind. It had to come out, to be dealt with."

== Discography ==
Studio albums and collaborations

- 1968: Grande Liquidação
- 1970: Tom Zé
- 1972: Se o Caso É Chorar
- 1973: Todos os Olhos
- 1976: Estudando o Samba
- 1978: Correio da Estação do Brás
- 1984: Nave Maria
- 1992: Brazil Classics, Vol. 5: The Hips of Tradition
- 1997: Parabelo (with Zé Miguel Wisnik)
- 1998: Com Defeito de Fabricação
- 1999: Postmodern Platos
- 2000: Jogos de Armar
- 2002: Santagustin (with Gilberto Assis)
- 2003: Imprensa Cantada
- 2005: Estudando o Pagode – Na Opereta Segregamulher e Amor
- 2006: Danç-Êh-Sá
- 2008: Danç-Êh-Sá Ao Vivo (live)
- 2008: Estudando a Bossa – Nordeste Plaza
- 2009: O Pirulito Da Ciência – Tom Zé & Banda Ao Vivo
- 2012: Tropicália Lixo Lógico
- 2014: Vira Lata na Via Láctea
- 2016: Canções Eróticas de Ninar
- 2017: Sem Você Não A
- 2022: Língua Brasileira

Compilations and box-sets

- 1990: Brazil Classics, Vol. 4: The Best of Tom Zé - Massive Hits
- 1999: 20 Preferidas
- 2000: Série Dois Momentos (vols. 1, 2, and 15)
- 2010: Studies of Tom Zé: Explaining Things So I Can Confuse You (box-set of "Brazil Classics, Vol. 4", "Estudando o Pagode", "Estudando A Bossa Nordeste Plaza" and live performances)
