= Tom Gurl Four =

American R&B female quartet

TG4
- TG4, 2002. left to right: Davida, Ambee, Keisha, and Ashley.

Background information
- Origin: United States
- Genres: R&B; pop; dance-pop; hip-hop
- Years active: 2001–2004
- Labels: A&M; T.U.G. Entertainment
- Past members: Keisha Henry; Sevyn Streeter; Ashley Gallo; Davida Williams

TG4 (Tomgirls 4 Eva) was an American R&B female quartet. The group consisted of four members Keisha Henry, Davida Williams, Sevyn Streeter (aka Ambee), and Ashley Gallo.

== Music career ==
The group was assembled by Chris Strokes and was signed to T.U.G. Entertainment, where Stokes served as their manager. He offered Sevyn Streeter (aka Ambee) the first spot in the T.U.G./A&M group after she opened for B2K and IMX at a concert in Orlando, Florida in early 2001. Davida, Ashley, and Keisha fell in line after a line of successful auditions. The name TG4 is short for Tom Girls 4. Sevyn explained, "We're like four Tom Girls," who tied for first place on Showtime at the Apollo when she was 10. "'When you're a girl and you act like a boy, you're a tomboy. We're girls and we act like guys but love being girls, so we're tom girls."

The group's only major single was "Virginity", which peaked at number 88 on the US Billboard R&B chart in 2002. Their second single from the album was "2 Minutes", which a music video was filmed for. It failed to chart on any Billboard chart. The group parted ways with their original label and their album, Time for the New, was shelved indefinitely. After Davida Williams departed from the group to focus on her acting career, they renamed the group Tomgirls 4 Eva and they were signed to Soul Chemistry. Shortly thereafter, the group disbanded.

== Performances and appearances ==
TG4 notable performances were on Soul Train and the Scream II tour with Lil' Bow Wow and B2K. In addition, the group had featured cameos in IMx's "Ain't No Need" video and B2K's "Why I Love You" video.

== After TG4 ==
Towards the time of the group's disbandment, member Davida Williams left the group to pursue an acting career. Keisha Henry made an appearance on the CW reality television show Pussycat Dolls Present: Girlicious.

Sevyn was later discovered by Rich Harrison on MySpace, and signed onto the RichCraft label. Sevyn Streeter signed a deal with Jive Records and the RichCraft label in 2007 as a member of the Rich Harrison's girl group, RichGirl. Although the group do not release a full debut LP, work on a self-titled debut album had begun in 2009 with a planned release in 2010 and 2011. The album saw the release of a promotional-single titled "24" featuring Bun B. and two official singles, "He Ain't wit Me Now (Tho)" and "Swagger Right". Following unsuccessful attempts to chart, the girls released their one and only full album release on Valentine's Day 2011 with a mixtape Fall in Love with RichGirl.

The group later disbanded after all members of the group pursued solo careers and different endeavors. On March 21, 2012, Sevyn released a song titled "Red Handed" along with a statement that confirmed her disbandment from the group and revealed that she had signed with Chris Brown's CBE imprint.

== Discography ==
=== Albums ===
Information
Time for the New
- Released: Shelved

=== Singles ===
Year	Single	Peak positions		
Year	Single	R&B	Hot Singles Sales	R&B Singles Sales
2002	"Virginity"	88	5	3
2002	"2 Minutes"	—	—	—
2004	"It's a Party"	—	—	—
