= Touch (Amerie album) =

2005 studio album by Amerie

- Standard edition cover (Note: On certain pressings of the album, Amerie's image is flipped horizontally.)

Studio album by Amerie
- Released: April 26, 2005
- Recorded: 2004–2005
- Studios: Sony Music (New York City) (Note: Tracks 1–9); Night Flight (Fort Washington, Maryland) (Note: Track 1); Studio 609 (Philadelphia) (Note: Track 10); The Spyda Dome (New York City) (Note: Track 11); Chalice (Hollywood) (Note: Eve's vocals on track 12); Lobo (Deer Park, New York) (Note: Track 13)
- Genre: R&B
- Length: 50:07
- Labels: Richcraft; Columbia; Sony Urban
- Producers: Bink!; Vidal Davis; Andre Harris; Rich Harrison; Jonathan "Lil Jon" Smith; Red Spyda; Bryce Wilson

Amerie chronology
All I Have (2002)	Touch (2005)	Because I Love It (2007)

Singles from Touch
- 1. "1 Thing" Released: January 18, 2005; 2. "Touch" Released: May 31, 2005; 3. "Talkin' About" Released: August 9, 2005

Touch is the second studio album by American singer Amerie, released on April 26, 2005, by Richcraft Records, Sony Urban Music, and Columbia Records. Following the release of her debut album, All I Have (2002), and her first acting role (in the 2004 film First Daughter), Amerie began work on her second studio album. As with All I Have, the album was co-written and produced by mentor Rich Harrison, with contributions from additional producers. Unlike her debut, Amerie co-wrote every track but one, and assumed more creative control over the visual imagery accompanying the album, such as music videos and artwork.

Touch is an R&B album with a diverse musical style, marking a transition from Amerie's neo-soul debut. Its songs feature pulses, funky percussion, pumping energy, go-go beats with an organic core built around horns and electric pianos. Upon release, Touch received generally positive reviews from music critics, who praised Amerie's vocals and Harrison's production. The album received numerous accolades, including two Grammy Award nominations at the 48th Annual Grammy Awards including Best Contemporary R&B Album.

Commercially, the album debuted at number five on the US Billboard 200 with first-week sales of 124,000 copies and was later certified gold by the Recording Industry Association of America (RIAA), having sold over 500,000 copies in the United States. The album also fared well elsewhere peaking within the top 40 of the UK Albums Chart. The album spawned three singles, including the lead single "1 Thing" which became Amerie's most commercially successful song to date, peaking at number eight on the US Billboard Hot 100. The song was followed by the release of the less successful singles "Touch" and "Talkin' About".

== Background ==
Following Amerie's meeting with producer Rich Harrison and signing to a record deal with Harrison's Richcraft Records, in partnership with Columbia Records, she released her debut album. Amerie's debut album, All I Have, was released in July 2002 to generally positive reviews. It debuted at number nine on the US Billboard 200, selling 89,000 copies in its first week of release; the album has since been certified gold by the Recording Industry Association of America (RIAA) and had sold 657,000 copies as of June 2008, according to Nielsen SoundScan. In 2004, Amerie earned her first acting role, portraying the role of Mia Thompson, a college student who rooms with the president's daughter, in the film First Daughter, alongside actress Katie Holmes. Shortly after her acting debut, Amerie began work on her second studio album.

== Recording ==
Amerie began work on the album in early 2004. As with All I Have, the album was co-written and produced by mentor Harrison, who contributed seven (new) tracks to the record; additional productions came from Lil Jon, Bryce Wilson, Red Spyda, and Dre & Vidal. Unlike on her first album, Amerie co-wrote every track but one, "Come with Me", which Harrison wrote. She also assumed more creative control over the visual imagery accompanying the album, such as videos and artwork—"I feel like when you do a record, you have a vision in your mind and you want to carry it across—and it doesn't end with the studio", she has said.

In 2004, when working on her second album, Amerie enlisted the services of Harrison, who had helped produce and write her first album. In May 2004, Harrison heard "Oh, Calcutta!" for the first time and began working on the beat accompanying the ten-second back-and-forth breakdown between Meters drummer Ziggy Modeliste and guitarist Leo Nocentelli. Harrison said he loved the work of the Meters, especially Modeliste, commenting, "Ziggy, he's crazy." He processed the way the breakdown could be "flipped", added a bongo drum, a cowbell, and a ride cymbal, and sent it to Amerie. According to Harrison, they wrote and finished the song in two to three hours.

Amerie's manager, Len Nicholson, felt the song was "the single" to release. When executives at Amerie's label, Columbia/Sony Urban Music, heard "1 Thing", they felt that the song's choruses needed to be "bigger". They recommended that more music be added to the percussion-focused beat, but Harrison and Amerie replied that adding more to the beat would overpower the song. Harrison and Amerie returned to the studio several times to rework the track. Each time they submitted a new version to the label, Columbia told them that the song sounded unfinished, but was unable to specify what should be changed. The label continued to refuse to release "1 Thing"; in Amerie's words, "People just weren't getting it".

== Music and lyrics ==
Touch is an R&B album, which musically differs from Amerie's neo-soul debut. Touch is built over "pulses with funky percussion, pumping sexy energy" and incorporates elements of go-go beats. Janet Tzou from Entertainment Weekly described the album's musical style as being "revitalizing R&B" that differs from other contemporary R&B artists, such as Beyoncé and Alicia Keys. The album's production is characterised as having an "organic core" and "loose-limbed swagger", which relies heavily on sampled horn screams and weeping electric pianos with all the songs having a "glossy, processed sheen."

The album's title track was produced by Lil Jon and is a dance and crunk&B track that experiments with Latin freestyle.

== Singles ==
Six months after recording "1 Thing", Amerie and Harrison leaked it to American radio stations in an attempt to get it released officially. The response from DJs and listeners was positive, and it consequently received airplay across the country. Columbia Records attempted to suppress the song because it was an unofficial release, and because Amerie's labelmate Jennifer Lopez had expressed interest in recording the song for her own album, Rebirth. Radio stations refused to retract the song from their playlists, and Columbia eventually began promoting "1 Thing" as a single, making it a last-minute addition to the soundtrack to the film Hitch. The song became Amerie's best-performing single to date. In the United States, it peaked at number eight on the Billboard Hot 100 and topped the Hot R&B/Hip-Hop Songs chart. The RIAA awarded a gold certification for digital sales in October 2005, and another gold certification for ringtone sales in June 2006. Internationally, the single peaked at number four on the UK Singles Chart and attained top-10 and top-20 positions across continental Europe.

The album's title track "Touch" was released as the album's second single and peaked at number 95 on the Hot R&B/Hip-Hop Songs chart in the United States, while reaching number 19 on the UK chart. "Talkin' About" was released as the album's third and final single. According to Amerie, it is one of her "really personal" songs and one of her favorite tracks on the album. Released as a promotional single, "Talkin' About" peaked at number two on Billboard's Bubbling Under R&B/Hip-Hop Singles chart. A remix was made featuring rapper Jadakiss. It was the third single from the album and Amerie told MTV News in August 2005 that she would be co-directing the music video with Chris Robinson, with whom she collaborated on the videos for the two previous singles. The video, however, was not filmed.

== Critical reception ==
Professional ratings
Review scores
Source	Rating
AllMusic	4/5 stars
Blender	4/5 stars
Entertainment Weekly	B
Pitchfork	7.6/10
Rolling Stone	3/5 stars
Slant Magazine	3/5 stars
Stylus Magazine	B
Uncut	2/5 stars
USA Today	3/4 stars
Vibe	4/5 marks

Touch received generally positive reviews from music critics. At Metacritic, which assigns a normalized rating out of 100 to reviews from mainstream critics, the album received an average score of 70, based on 12 reviews. AllMusic's Andy Kellman said that Touch is an improvement over All I Have because of better written songs and consistent production, which is accessible to listeners of different ages. Tom Breihan of Pitchfork felt that Harrison makes the most out of Amerie's "thin, reedy" voice, which he found more sophisticated than singers such as Nivea or Ashanti. Ben Sisario of Blender magazine wrote that "Amerie's heat is irresistible, in large part because it's subtle." Vibe magazine's Angie Romero complimented her emotional singing, but was most impressed by her songs with Harrison: "Their exquisite blend of the delicate and the demonstrative proves that, whether it's hard or soft, love is love." Bill Werde of Rolling Stone observed some ordinary R&B songs on what is otherwise a more mature album by Amerie.

In a less enthusiastic review, Stylus Magazine's Al Shipley was disappointed that Harrison did not produce the rest of Touch, which he felt would have made it more consistent. Both Uncut magazine and Kelefa Sanneh of The New York Times said that none of the album's other songs are as impressive as "1 Thing"; Sanneh called it one of the year's best singles. Robert Christgau of The Village Voice singled out "1 Thing" and the title track as "choice cuts", which indicates good songs on an otherwise bad album. He referred to "1 Thing" as "a machine-gun one-shot on an album with its safety engaged" in his accompanying essay for the Pazz & Jop critics poll, in which the song had been voted the second best single of 2005.

== Commercial performance ==
Touch debuted at number five on the US Billboard 200, selling 124,000 copies in its first week of release. The album was certified gold by the RIAA in August 2005, and by June 2009, it had sold 406,000 copies in the United States. The album entered the UK Albums Chart at number 32 before peaking at number 28; it spent a total of six weeks on the chart. Elsewhere, Touch reached number 57 in Australia, number 59 in France, number 70 the Netherlands, number 83 in Switzerland, number 91 in Germany and number 93 in Belgium.

== Track listing ==
Standard edition
No.	Title	Writer(s)	Producer(s)	Length
1.	"1 Thing"	Amerie Rogers; Rich Harrison; Stanley Walden	Harrison	4:01
2.	"All I Need"	Rogers; Harrison; Dexter Wansel	Harrison	3:09
3.	"Touch"	Jonathan Smith; Rogers; Sean Garrett; Craig Love; LaMarquis Jefferson; James "LRoc" Phillips	Jonathan "Lil Jon" Smith; Rogers^{[a]}	3:38
4.	"Not the Only One"	Rogers; Makeda Davis; Bryce Wilson; Simon Johnson; Andre Gonzales	Wilson; The Buchanans^{[b]}; Rogers^{[a]}	3:46
5.	"Like It Used to Be"	Rogers; Harrison	Harrison	3:39
6.	"Talkin' About"	Rogers; Harrison	Harrison	4:19
7.	"Come with Me"	Harrison	Harrison	3:34
8.	"Rolling Down My Face"	Rogers; Harrison; Roy Ayers	Harrison	3:34
9.	"Can We Go" (featuring Carl Thomas)	Rogers; Thomas; Philip Bailey; Maurice White	Bink!; Rogers^{[a]}	3:29
10.	"Just Like Me"	Andre Harris; Vidal Davis; Ryan Toby; Jason Boyd; Sunshine Anderson; Rogers	Harris; Davis; Rogers^{[a]}; Toby^{[a]}	3:46
11.	"Falling"	Rogers; Andy Thelusma	Red Spyda; Rogers^{[a]}	4:58
12.	"1 Thing" (featuring Eve)	Rogers; Harrison; Walden; Eve Jeffers	Harrison	4:18
13.	"Why Don't We Fall in Love" (Richcraft remix)	Harrison	Harrison	3:36
Total length:				50:07

European edition bonus track
No.	Title	Writer(s)	Producer(s)	Length
14.	"Man Up" (featuring Nas)	Johnson; Gonzales; Elizabeth Wyce; Michael Quatro; Lynn Kinshkon; Nasir Jones	The Buchanans	3:41
Total length:				53:48

Japanese edition bonus track
No.	Title	Writer(s)	Producer(s)	Length
14.	"I'm Coming Out"	Bernard Edwards; Nile Rodgers	Cory Rooney; Loren Dawson	3:31
Total length:				53:38

=== Notes ===
- ^{^[a]} signifies a vocal producer
- ^{^[b]} signifies a co-producer

=== Sample credits ===
- "1 Thing" contain excerpts from "Oh, Calcutta!", written by Stanley Walden and performed by the Meters.
- "All I Need" contains elements of "You Are All I Need", written by Dexter Wansel and performed by Jean Carn.
- "Rolling Down My Face" contains an interpolation of "Searching", written and performed by Roy Ayers.
- "Can We Go" contains excerpts from "Evil", written by Phillip Bailey and Maurice White, and performed by Earth, Wind & Fire.
- "Why Don't We Fall in Love" (Richcraft remix) contains elements and excerpts from "You're the Reason Why", written by Kenneth Gamble and Leon Huff, and performed by The Ebonys.
- "Man Up" contains an interpolation of "Stripper", written by Michael Quatro and Lynn Kinshkon, and performed by Quatro.

== Personnel ==
Credits adapted from the liner notes of Touch.

=== Musicians ===
- Amerie – vocals (all tracks); flute (track 10)
- Craig Love – guitars (track 3)
- LaMarquis Jefferson – bass (track 3)
- LRoc – keys (track 3)
- Carl Thomas – vocals (track 9)
- Vidal Davis – all other instruments (track 10)
- Andre Harris – all other instruments (track 10)
- Eve – vocals (track 12)
- Rich Harrison – all instruments (track 13)

=== Technical ===
- Rich Harrison – production (tracks 1, 2, 5–8, 12)
- Scotty Beats – recording (tracks 1, 2, 5–8, 12)
- Bram Tobey – recording assistance (tracks 1, 2, 5–8, 12)
- Tony Maserati – mixing (tracks 1, 2, 4–8, 12, 13)
- Jonathan "Lil Jon" Smith – production (track 3)
- Jim Caruana – recording (tracks 3, 4, 9)
- John Frye – mixing (track 3)
- Amerie – vocal production (tracks 3, 4, 9–11); executive production
- Gary Fly – vocal production assistance (track 3)
- Delvida Flaherty – production coordination (track 3)
- Bryce Wilson – production (track 4)
- The Buchanans – co-production (track 4)
- Bink! – production (track 9)
- Rich Keller – mixing (tracks 9, 11)
- Andre Harris – production (track 10)
- Vidal Davis – production (track 10)
- Vincent Dilorenzo – recording, mixing (track 10)
- Ryan Toby – vocal production (track 10)
- Red Spyda – production (track 11)
- Dupri – recording (track 11)
- Gary Noble – mixing (track 11)
- Dave Ashton – recording (Eve's vocals) (track 12)
- Alan Masor – recording assistance (Eve's vocals) (track 12)
- José Sánchez – recording, Pro Tools (track 13)
- Flip Osman – mixing assistance (track 13)
- Lenny Nicholson – executive production
- Dorsey James – associate executive production
- Tom Coyne – mastering

=== Artwork ===
- Ellen To – art direction
- Susanne Cerha – associate design direction
- Michael Biondo – photography

== Charts ==
=== Weekly charts ===
Weekly chart performance for Touch
Chart (2005)	Peak position
Australian Albums (ARIA)	57
Australian Urban Albums (ARIA)	11
Belgian Albums (Ultratop Flanders)	93
Canadian Albums (Nielsen SoundScan)	36
Dutch Albums (Album Top 100)	70
European Albums (Billboard)	100
French Albums (SNEP)	59
German Albums (Offizielle Top 100)	91
Japanese Albums (Oricon)	13
Scottish Albums (Official Charts)	54
Swiss Albums (Schweizer Hitparade)	83
UK Albums (Official Charts)	28
UK R&B Albums (Official Charts)	5
US Billboard 200 (Billboard)	5
US Top R&B/Hip-Hop Albums (Billboard)	3

=== Year-end charts ===
Year-end chart performance for Touch
Chart (2005)	Position
US Billboard 200	192
US Top R&B/Hip-Hop Albums (Billboard)	50

== Certifications ==
Certifications for Touch
Region	Certification	Certified units/sales
United Kingdom (BPI)	Gold	100,000^{‡}
United States (RIAA)	Gold	500,000^{^}
^{^} Shipments figures based on certification alone.^{‡} Sales+streaming figures based on certification alone.

== Release history ==
Release dates and formats for Touch
Region	Date	Format	Label(s)	Ref.
United States	April 26, 2005	CD	Richcraft; Sony Urban; Columbia	
Japan	April 27, 2005	CD	Sony BMG	
United Kingdom	May 2, 2005	CD	Columbia	
Australia	July 1, 2005	CD	Sony BMG	
United States	July 19, 2005	DualDisc	Richcraft; Sony Urban; Columbia; CMV	
Germany	August 22, 2005	CD	Sony BMG	
