= Talkin' About =

Single by Amerie

from the album Touch
- Released: August 9, 2005
- Recorded: September 2004
- Studio: Sony Music Studios (New York, NY)
- Genre: R&B; dance-pop; funk; go-go
- Length: 4:19
- Label: Columbia
- Songwriters: Amerie Rogers, Rich Harrison
- Producer: Rich Harrison

Amerie singles chronology
"Touch" (2005)	"Talkin' About" (2005)	"I Don't Care" (2005)

"Talkin' About" is a song by American recording artist Amerie. It was co-written and produced by Rich Harrison for her second album, Touch (2005). According to Amerie, it is one of her "really personal" songs and may be her favorite track on the album. Released as a promotional single, "Talkin' About" peaked at number two on the US Billboard Bubbling Under R&B/Hip-Hop Singles chart. There was a remix made featuring American rapper Jadakiss.

It was the third single from the album, and Amerie told MTV News in August 2005 that she would be co-directing the music video with Chris Robinson, with whom she collaborated on the videos for the two previous singles, "1 Thing" and "Touch". However, the video was not filmed.

== Charts ==
=== Weekly charts ===
Chart (2009)	Peak position
US Billboard Bubbling Under R&B/Hip-Hop Singles	2
