= 24's =

24's may refer to:

- "24's" (T.I. song), 2003
- "24's", a song by Obie Trice from Second Round's on Me, 2006
- "24's" (RichGirl song), 2009
