= Rich Harrison =

American record producer (born 1979)

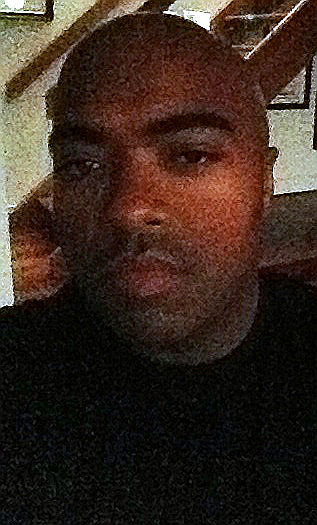
- Harrison in 2012

Background information
- Born: Richard Christopher Harrison; 1979 (age 46–47)
- Origin: Washington, D.C., U.S.
- Genres: R&B; go-go; hip hop; funk
- Occupations: Record producer; songwriter
- Years active: 1999–present
- Label: Richcraft

Richard Christopher Harrison (born 1979) is an American record producer and songwriter specializing in R&B and hip hop music. The winner of a Grammy Award, Harrison is well known for producing songs such as Jennifer Lopez's "Get Right" (2005), Amerie's "1 Thing" (2005), and Beyoncé and Jay-Z's "Crazy in Love" (2003). Harrison is the founder of Richcraft Entertainment, a label that housed artists such as singer Amerie, R&B girl group RichGirl, and rapper Young Steff.

== Early life and education ==
A classically trained pianist and trumpet player, from an early age Harrison demonstrated the ability to play music he heard on the radio, later attending Howard University in Washington, D.C., majoring in history and hip-hop music.

== Career ==
Harrison's first big music deal came in 1999 when Harrison worked with Mary J. Blige on "Beautiful Ones" for her album Mary. In 2001, he created his own production company, Richcraft Inc., and immediately wrote and produced Amerie's debut album, All I Have. In 2004 he won a Grammy Award for Beyoncé's "Crazy in Love", and a nomination for his work on Usher's Confessions album.

Harrison was back in the spotlight early in 2005 to work with Amerie, and produced Amerie's "1 Thing", from her album Touch, known for its infectious breakbeats and Amerie's unconventional vocals. A similar beat was used by Harrison for Toni Braxton's "Take This Ring" from her 2005 album Libra both tracks include elements of go-go (mainly in the strong, funky drumming with added percussion). In 2005, The New York Times called him "one of R&B's most exciting producers."

Harrison is currently involved in projects with 50 Cent, Tweet, Missy Elliott, Eve, Brandy, Young Steff and Dawn Robinson. Harrison has worked with Janet Jackson, Usher, Alicia Keys and Jennifer Lopez, and is still assisting the South Korean pop singer Se7en with his first American album, assisted by his producer Lionell Davis.

Harrison has been approached by many artists to assist with album productions, but it appears he is now focusing his time on his own artists, such as Young Steff and girl group RichGirl. There is a possibility that he may be appearing on Toni Braxton's forthcoming album.

Other works include tracks for Claudette Ortiz's solo album, 3LW's latest and as yet unreleased album and tracks that may appear on 50 Cent's next album.

== Production discography ==
=== 1999 ===
Mary J. Blige – Mary

- 04. "Beautiful Ones" (co-produced along with Chucky Thompson)

=== 2001 ===
Mary J. Blige – No More Drama

- 15. "In the Meantime", producer

=== 2002 ===
Amerie – All I Have, producer and songwriter

- 01. "Why Don't We Fall in Love"
- 02. "Talkin' to Me"
- 03. "Nothing Like Loving You"
- 04. "Can't Let Go"
- 05. "Need You Tonight"
- 06. "Got to Be There"
- 07. "I Just Died"
- 08. "Hatin' On You"
- 09. "Float"
- 10. "Show Me"
- 11. "All I Have"
- 12. "Outro"
- 13. "Just What I Needed to See" (Japanese bonus track)
- 14. "Why Don't We Fall in Love" (Remix) (featuring Ludacris) (Japanese bonus track)
- 15. "Why Don't We Fall in Love (Richcraft Remix)" (Japanese bonus track)

Kelly Rowland – Simply Deep

- 04. "Can't Nobody"

=== 2003 ===
Tha' Rayne – Reign Supreme

- 02. "Didn't You Know"

Beyoncé – Dangerously in Love

- 01. "Crazy in Love" (featuring Jay Z)
  - Sample credit: The Chi-Lites – "Are You My Woman (Tell Me So)"
- 05. "Be with You"
  - Sample credits: The Brothers Johnson – "Strawberry Letter 23", Bootsy's Rubber Band – I'd Rather Be with You

=== 2004 ===
Usher – Confessions

- 11. "Take Your Hand"
  - Sample credit: Harold Melvin & The Blue Notes – "Is There a Place for Me"

Destiny's Child – Destiny Fulfilled

- 02. "Soldier" (featuring T.I. and Lil Wayne)

=== 2005 ===
Jennifer Lopez – Rebirth

- 01. "Get Right"
  - Sample credit: Maceo & the Macks – "Soul Power"
- 04. "Whatever You Wanna Do"
  - Sample credit: The Nite-Liters – "Con-Funk-Shun"

Christina Milian – Be Cool soundtrack

- 08. "Ain't No Reason"

Amerie – Touch

- 01. "1 Thing"
- 02. "All I Need"
- 05. "Like It Used to Be"
- 06. "Talkin' About"
- 07. "Come with Me"
- 08. "Rolling Down My Face"
- 13. "Why Don't We Fall in Love" (Richcraft Remix)

Missy Elliott – The Cookbook

- 10. "Can't Stop"

Pussycat Dolls – PCD

- 06. "I Don't Need a Man"

Toni Braxton – Libra

- 04. "Take This Ring"
  - Sample credit: The Meters – "Here Comes the Meter Man"

=== 2006 ===
Christina Aguilera – Back to Basics

- 02. "Makes Me Wanna Pray" (featuring Steve Winwood)
  - Sample credit: Traffic – "Glad", band member Steve Winwood credited as featured artist

Beyoncé – B'Day

- 03. "Suga Mama"
  - Sample credit: Jake Wade and the Soul Searchers – "Searching for Soul"
- 07. "Freakum Dress"
- 11. "Creole" (Japanese bonus track)

3LW - Point of No Return (unreleased) Do Ya & Up To You

Diddy – Press Play

- 18. "Making It Hard" (featuring Mary J. Blige)

Mos Def – Tru3 Magic

- 02. "Undeniable"
  - Sample credit: The Temptations – "Message From a Black Man", Run-DMC – "Sucker MC's"

=== 2007 ===
Che'Nelle – Things Happen for a Reason

- 10. "Summer Jam"

=== 2008 ===
Jean Grae – Jeanius

- 15. "That's What's Up Now" (Bonus track)

=== 2011 ===
Marsha Ambrosius – Late Nights & Early Mornings

- 03. "Late Nights & Early Mornings"
  - Sample credit: Prince – "The Beautiful Ones"

Jennifer Hudson – I Remember Me

- 01. "No One Gonna Love You"

Eric Roberson – Mister Nice Guy

- 01. "Mister Nice Guy"

RichGirl – RichGirl

- "24's"
- "Itty Bitty"
- "He Ain't Wit Me Now (Tho)"

RichGirl – Fall in Love with RichGirl

- 02. "Smile & Wave" (featuring Chris Brown)
- 04. "Circles"

=== 2016 ===
Amerie - Drive

- 06. "Out Loud"

=== 2020 ===
Tiffany Haddish

- "Too Much"
- "Do Our Thing (featuring Snoop Dogg)"

=== 2026 ===
Kehlani - Kehlani

- "Anotha Luva (featuring Lil Wayne)"

=== Unreleased ===
3LW

- "Do Ya"
- "Got Me On Lock"
- "Up 2 You"

Amerie

- "Love's Off the Chain"

Cynthia Lissette

- "Don't Wanna Go"
- "What U Say"

Gwen Stefani

- "Parental Advisory"

Janet Jackson

- "Clap Your Hands"
- "Pops Up"
- "Speed It Up (Put It On Me)"
- "What Can I Say"

Mary J. Blige

- "Outta My Head"

Natasha Ramos

- "Here I Am"

RichGirl

- "Pimp Cup" (featuring Snoop Dogg)
- "Foolish"
- "Treasures"
- "Blowin' Up Phones"
- "Millionaire"

Se7en

- "This is My Year" (featuring Fabolous)

Usher

- "Dat Girl Right There" (featuring Ludacris)
- "Ride"
- "Whatever I Want" (featuring Mike Jones)
- "I Did It" (featuring RichGirl)

Young Steff

- "Dat Gurl Right"
- "Don't Trip"
- "Feeling Myself" (featuring Brave)
- "Put That On Everything"
