= 1 Thing =

2005 single by Amerie

Single by Amerie

from the album Touch
- Released: January 18, 2005
- Studio: Sony Music (New York City); Night Flight (Fort Washington, Maryland)
- Genre: R&B; funk; go-go
- Length: 4:01
- Label: Columbia
- Songwriters: Amerie Rogers; Rich Harrison; Stanley Walden
- Producer: Rich Harrison

Amerie singles chronology
"Paradise" (2003)	"1 Thing" (2005)	"Touch" (2005)

Music video
- "1 Thing" on YouTube

"1 Thing" is a song by the American singer Amerie from her second album, Touch (2005). Written by Amerie and Rich Harrison, and produced by the latter, the song is influenced by go-go rhythms and prominently samples the Meters' 1970 funk recording of "Oh, Calcutta!", written by Stanley Walden. Its lyrics focus on an unidentified "thing" that fuels a romantic attraction. It also appeared on the soundtrack to the 2005 romantic comedy film Hitch.

"1 Thing" received acclaim from critics, and peaked at number eight on the US Billboard Hot 100 and number four in the United Kingdom, becoming Amerie's sole top-10 single in the former and her first in the latter ("Take Control" reached number 10 in 2007) and her biggest hit single worldwide. Its digital download and ringtone releases were each certified gold by the Recording Industry Association of America (RIAA). A remix of "1 Thing" featuring rapper Eve is also present on Touch.

The song earned Amerie a nomination for Best Female R&B Vocal Performance at the 48th Annual Grammy Awards in 2006, and was also nominated for Choice R&B/Hip-Hop Track at the 2005 Teen Choice Awards. It was later named the 22nd and 25th best song of the 2000s decade by Rolling Stone and Robert Christgau, respectively.

== Conception and release ==
In 2004, when working on her second album Touch, Amerie enlisted the services of producer Rich Harrison, who had helped produce and write her first album All I Have. In May 2004, Harrison heard "Oh, Calcutta!" by the Meters for the first time and began working on the beat accompanying the ten-second back-and-forth breakdown between Meters drummer Ziggy Modeliste and guitarist Leo Nocentelli. Harrison said he loved the work of the Meters, especially Modeliste, commenting, "Ziggy, he's crazy." He processed the way the breakdown could be "flipped", added a bongo drum, a cowbell, and a ride cymbal, and sent it to Amerie. According to Harrison, they wrote and finished the song in two to three hours.

Amerie's manager and eventual husband, Len Nicholson, felt the song was "the single" to release. When executives at Amerie's label, Columbia/Sony Urban Music, heard "1 Thing", they felt that the song's choruses needed to be "bigger". They recommended that more music be added to the percussion-focused beat, but Harrison and Amerie replied that adding more to the beat would overpower the song. Harrison and Amerie returned to the studio several times to rework the track. Each time they submitted a new version to the label, Columbia told them that the song sounded unfinished, but was unable to specify what should be changed. The label continued to refuse to release "1 Thing"; in Amerie's words, "People just weren't getting it".

Later in 2004, six months after recording "1 Thing", Amerie and Harrison leaked it to US radio stations in an attempt to get it released officially. The response from DJs and listeners was positive, and it consequently received airplay across the country. Columbia Records attempted to suppress the song because it was an unofficial release, and because Jennifer Lopez (another artist on the label) had expressed interest in recording the song for her own album, Rebirth. Radio stations refused to retract the song from their playlists, and Columbia eventually began promoting "1 Thing" as a single, making it a last-minute addition to the Hitch soundtrack. Lopez settled on another Harrison-produced, funk-infused track, the Usher outtake "Get Right". The song was officially serviced to American urban radio stations on January 18, 2005.

== Theme and sound ==
'1 Thing'
A sample of "1 Thing".

"1 Thing" was produced by Harrison and is built around a sample of the Meters' 1970 version of the theme song from the musical Oh! Calcutta!, "Oh, Calcutta!", written by Stanley Walden. Built around the Meters' funky beat-driven percussion, "1 Thing" finds Amerie lamenting an aspect of a relationship that keeps her satisfied. Even if other factors are less than positive, there is one thing that keeps her hooked ("It's this one thing that's got me trippin'"). Amerie said that the song was inspired by a conversation she had with Harrison "about relationships and how there's always one thing that keeps you attracted to someone. No matter what they do or how they act, there's that one undeniable thing that keeps you coming back." She told Blender that the "one thing" "could be bringing flowers, or something more ... physical. People think I'm just this good girl, but there are other sides they don't see."

Despite being based on a New Orleans funk sample, the song belies a strong go-go influence. Harrison likened the two based on their heavy use of percussion and chant. Amerie stated, "You don't hear go-go outside of D.C. ... I was like, 'We have to do it in an up-tempo way because when you hear it on the radio in D.C., it's fast.' ... So it's a fresh sound for everybody but people in the D.C./Maryland/Virginia area. They [already] know what it is."

== Critical reception ==
"1 Thing" received acclaim from music critics. In its review of Touch, Rolling Stone named the song "an early front-runner for song-of-the-summer status", also ranking it the number one single of 2005. Pitchfork stated that Harrison "knows something about horns, big glorious ascending heavenly anthemic horns" and "drums, huge sweaty riotous back-and-forth second-line old-school Clyde Stubblefield drums." AllMusic described "1 Thing" as being "just as exciting" as "Oh, Calcutta!" for how it "[flails] all over the place with unbound joy".

The song received second place behind Kanye West and Jamie Foxx's "Gold Digger" on the 2005 Village Voice Pazz & Jop list, a survey of several hundred music critics conducted by Robert Christgau. Blender ranked "1 Thing" number 191 on its list of "The 500 Greatest Songs Since You Were Born". It praised the song's "cascading drums...and Amerie's frantic, top-of-her-range vocals". Calling it "a pretty fucking smart move to wrap perfect pop around a question that stays open all night", Pitchfork listed the song as the second best single of 2005, behind Antony and the Johnsons' "Hope There's Someone". The song was ranked 32nd on Pitchfork's top 500 songs of the 2000s, and the publication included "1 Thing" in its collection of The Pitchfork 500. Christgau named it the 25th best song of the 2000s. Björk also dubbed it the "Best! Song! Ever!"

The song received a nomination for Best Female R&B Vocal Performance at the 48th Annual Grammy Awards, but lost to Mariah Carey's "We Belong Together".

== Commercial performance ==
In the United States, "1 Thing" debuted at the bottom of the Billboard Hot 100 on February 12, 2005. The song gradually climbed the chart over a 10-week period, peaking at number eight on the chart dated April 23, 2005, and exited the chart after a total of 20 weeks. Additionally, the single topped the Hot R&B/Hip-Hop Songs chart in on April 30, 2005, while reaching numbers 13 and 28 on the Rhythmic Top 40 and Pop 100 charts, respectively. The song was certified gold by the Recording Industry Association of America (RIAA) in October 2005 for digital sales and in June 2006 for ringtone sales.

In the United Kingdom, "1 Thing" debuted and peaked at number four on the UK Singles Chart in late May 2005. It went on to spend 14 weeks on the chart and became the 38th best-selling single of 2005. In neighboring Ireland, the single debuted at number 10 on the Irish Singles Chart. It climbed to number six two weeks later, remaining on the chart for another nine weeks. "1 Thing" was successful in continental Europe, where it peaked at number 13 on the European Hot 100 Singles chart. It reached the top 10 in Denmark, Finland, and Norway; the top 20 in Belgium and the Netherlands; and the top 40 in France, Germany, Sweden, and Switzerland. The song was also commercially successful in Oceania, reaching the top 20 in Australia and New Zealand.

== Music video ==
The music video for "1 Thing", co-directed by Chris Robinson and Amerie, publicly revealed the singer's sexual side. It focuses on her dance routines, featuring her as a go-go dancer in various setups, intercut with footage from the film Hitch. Amerie approached Robinson with the video's concept in mind, and the two collaborated again when directing the music video for the following single, "Touch".

== Covers and other uses ==
American punk rock band T.S.O.L. released a cover of "1 Thing" as a 12-inch vinyl single in 2019. The band have attached a political theme to their version of the song. Frontman Jack Grisham said:

I like go-go music and soul and anything that really moves. I first heard Amerie's "1 Thing" in 2005, when it was released. Fucking infectious man, the way that groove keeps rolling, and she's such a great vocalist. The lyrics were your basic relationship trip but then it hit me, this isn't just a song about some dude, these lyrics read like a song to a system or a government that'd been up to no good. When she sang, "memories keep ringing bells" I was thinking of the state of our union today, the turmoil in our society, and where we'd been before—I was musing on our involvement in the Middle East, Latin America, Vietnam. I was thinking about the dirty deeds that this nation had been up to and then she sang, "why don't you just admit it" and I realized that no one in power, not in this country, was ever gonna admit that we were wrong.

Their cover would later appear on their 2024 album, A-Side Graffiti.

American rapper Lauryn Hill sampled "1 Thing" during live performances, using the song during the second and last part of her single "Doo Wop (That Thing)". Likewise, British girl group Girls Aloud used the song as an interlude in performances of their 2004 single "Love Machine" during their Chemistry Tour in 2006. Additionally, alternative rock band Elbow covered the song in a comedic fashion for an August 2005 performance on BBC Radio 1's Live Lounge.

The song was played during the pole dancing scene in the 2010 film Somewhere, and a gospel rendition of the song was included in the 2023 musical comedy Praise This.

== Remixes ==
The song's only official remix features guest vocals from rapper Eve, and an alternate version of the music video was created for it. Amerie said that she chose Eve to appear on the remix because most other female R&B singers were accompanied by male rappers, and that Eve "epitomizes that whole independent fearless female doing her thing. She's fashionable and very much a woman even though she definitely has a lot of attitude, the strength that most would attribute to men. ... With '1 Thing' being such an aggressive track, it was perfect to see two females really doing it."

Unofficial remixes of "1 Thing" would later materialize, with rappers Fabolous and B.G. releasing versions of the song. DJ Siik would remix "1 Thing", using instrumentals by Japanese producer Nujabes. Stylus Magazine listed his remix seventh on its list of the top ten remixes of 2005, commenting that "it's enough to warrant a whole change of venue, from the sizzling pep of the dance floor to the silk luxury of the bedroom." Most of these unofficial remixes were released on mixtapes and Amerie would later praise them, particularly those by Fabolous, B.G., and Juelz Santana.

== Track listings ==
- UK and European CD single
1. "1 Thing" (radio edit) – 4:02
2. "1 Thing" (radio version featuring Eve) – 3:34
- UK and European maxi-CD single
1. "1 Thing" (radio edit) – 4:02
2. "1 Thing" (featuring B.G.) – 4:13
3. "Talkin' to Me" (Mark Ronson Sunshine remix – no loop) – 3:06
4. "1 Thing" (instrumental) – 3:59
5. "1 Thing" (video) – 4:01
- US 12-inch single

A1. "1 Thing" (album version) – 4:01
A2. "1 Thing" (instrumental) – 3:59
A3. "1 Thing" (a cappella) – 3:55
B1. "1 Thing" (remix featuring Eve) – 4:13
B2. "1 Thing" (remix featuring B.G.) – 4:13

== Credits and personnel ==
Credits are adapted from the liner notes of Touch.

=== Recording and management ===
- Recorded at Sony Music, New York City, and Night Flight Studios, Fort Washington, Maryland
- Mixed at The Hit Factory, New York City
- Mastered at Sterling Sound, New York City
- Published by Mi Suk Publishing (ASCAP) controlled and administered by Universal Music Corp. (ASCAP)/EMI Blackwood Music, Inc. (BMI) obo itself and Dam Rich Music (BMI)/EMI U Catalog Inc. (ASCAP)

=== Personnel ===
- Amerie – vocals
- Rich Harrison – production
- Jocelyn McElroy – background vocals
- Bram Tobey – recording assistance
- Tony Maserati – mixing
- Tom Coyne – mastering

== Charts ==
=== Weekly charts ===
Weekly chart performance for "1 Thing"
Chart (2005)	Peak position
Australia (ARIA)	13
Australian Urban (ARIA)	7
Austria (Ö3 Austria Top 40)	54
Belgium (Ultratop 50 Flanders)	16
Belgium (Ultratip Bubbling Under Wallonia)	5
Canada CHR/Pop Top 30 (Radio & Records)	22
Czech Republic (IFPI)	50
Denmark (Tracklisten)	9
Europe (European Hot 100 Singles)	13
Finland (Suomen virallinen lista)	5
Finland (Suomen virallinen hittiälistalla)	21
France (SNEP)	35
Germany (GfK)	34
Ireland (IRMA)	6
Netherlands (Dutch Top 40)	14
Netherlands (Single Top 100)	12
New Zealand (Recorded Music NZ)	12
Norway (VG-lista)	10
Scottish Singles Sales (Official Charts)	5
Sweden (Sverigetopplistan)	30
Switzerland (Schweizer Hitparade)	28
UK Singles (Official Charts)	4
UK Hip Hop/R&B (Official Charts)	1
US Billboard Hot 100 (Billboard)	8
US Hot R&B/Hip-Hop Songs (Billboard)	1
US Pop 100 (Billboard)	28
US Rhythmic Top 40 (Billboard)	13

Chart (2013)	Peak position
UK Hip Hop/R&B (Official Charts)	31

=== Year-end charts ===
Year-end chart performance for "1 Thing"
Chart (2005)	Position
Australia (ARIA)	77
UK Singles (OCC)	38
UK Urban (Music Week)	5
US Billboard Hot 100	67
US Hot R&B/Hip-Hop Songs (Billboard)	26
US Rhythmic Top 40 (Billboard)	72

== Certifications ==
Certifications and sales for "1 Thing"
Region	Certification	Certified units/sales
New Zealand (RMNZ)	Platinum	30,000^{‡}
United Kingdom (BPI)	Platinum	600,000^{‡}
United States (RIAA)	Gold	500,000^{^}
^{^} Shipments figures based on certification alone.^{‡} Sales+streaming figures based on certification alone.

== Release history ==
Release dates and formats for "1 Thing"
Region	Date	Format(s)	Label(s)	Ref.
United States	January 18, 2005	Urban radio	Columbia	
United States	March 8, 2005	Digital download	Columbia	
United States	March 28, 2005	Contemporary hit radio	Columbia	
United Kingdom	May 12, 2005	Digital download	Columbia	
United Kingdom	May 23, 2005	12-inch vinyl; CD	Columbia	
Australia	May 23, 2005	CD	Columbia	
Denmark	May 30, 2005	CD	Columbia	
