= He Ain't wit Me Now (Tho) =

Single by RichGirl

from the album RichGirl
- Released: June 2, 2009
- Recorded: 2009
- Genre: R&B, Hip hop
- Length: 3:45
- Label: Richcraft/Jive
- Songwriter: Rich Harrison
- Producer: Rich Harrison

RichGirl singles chronology
| "24's" (2009) | "He Ain't wit Me Now (Tho)" (2009) | "Swagger Right" (2010) |

"He Ain't wit Me Now (Tho)" is a song by R&B girl group RichGirl. The song serves as the group's debut single from the quartet's self-titled debut album, RichGirl, which was later shelved following the group's disbandment. The single was produced and written by Rich Harrison, who has additionally worked with Beyoncé on her chart-topping 2003 hit "Crazy in Love" and Amerie on "1 Thing". The song was digitally released on June 2, 2009 on iTunes, and released onto "Rhythmic and Urban" radio the following July.

Many critics have given positive reviews on the single, complimenting Harrison's beat as "hectic" and "blinding" and being in huge favor of the ladies' vocal-performances, stating that when both are added together it creates a song as "dangerous" as "He Ain't wit Me Now (Tho)." A music video for the single was shot and directed by the Norwegian Ray Kay and released on May 22, 2009.

== Background and release ==
The song serves as the lead single of the group's self-entitled debut album RichGirl. The song was released for digital download on June 2, 2009. In the month of July 2009, the single was released onto Rhythmic, Urban and Urban Club radio. The song was additionally released on a free EP distributed by the quartet's official website, alongside the group's promotional single "24's" and three snippets of songs expected to be included on their debut album.

=== Live performances ===
The song has been performed several times by the quartet, most of which have been at exclusive concerts and televised appearances. While touring with Beyoncé as the opening act of the I Am... World Tour, the quartet included the song on their setlist, performing the single in outfits similar to the music video with ladders on stage. The song was additionally performed at many exclusive concerts held by certain radio stations including BB Kings and a Kiss FM concert in L.A.

== Critical reception ==
The song received very positive reviews by critics most of which complimented the quartet debuting with such an explosion of base and vocal power-houses. Daniel of MTV Buzzworthy stated "I do expect that this jam is gonna bounce your ass all the way through summer before you even notice school's out. Get wise to RichGirl and brace yourself for more high-drama R&B out of these ATL all-stars, coming your way soon." Ben Ratliff of The New York Times put the song on a list of "Notable Dispatches From the Edge of Jazz and Beyond" that came in at No. 3 on the "Top Songs". With a rating of seven out of ten, NewMusicReviews named the single decent, stating that although it might not find multiple chart-success it may still receive plenty of "action." Awarding the song three stars out of five, DJBooth showed great praise for the song stating that although their album doesn't have a release date, that all may change following possible success with the single. Felipe Delerme of FADER praised the song for bringing back the "glory days of Glam&B," adding that they saved a spot in an "R&B Honeys desktop folder" for a group like this to perform this kind of song. Delerme ended his review by stating that the song's release could mark the return to a simpler time.

Billboard named the song No. 91 on their list of 100 Greatest Girl Group Songs of All Time.

== Composition ==
"He Ain't wit Me Now (Tho)" has been paced at mid-tempo, seeing production duties by Rich Harrison, who has additionally worked with Beyoncé on her chart-topping "Crazy in Love" and Amerie on "1 Thing". Instrumentally, the song features Harrison creating a blinding beat, built around a loop of mid-century Hungarian classical music, that has been described as being "inspired by absurdist literature". Described as a "BANANAS" beat by FADER, the song sounds as though it were to sample an Eastern European 20th century quartet, referring to György Kurtág.

Vocally, the ladies of RichGirl perform "acrobatics" over Harrison's beat which has been additionally been described as thunderous. Harrison enhances the ladies’ vocals with a percussion-brass-cello combination that has been compared to that of an "NFL Films-esque instrumental."

== Music video ==
"What I wanted to do with it was to communicate all of their energy visually and I also wanted to create something that would give them their own sort of iconic edge to their visual when they first come out."

— Director Ray Kay on the importance of the group's first video.

The music video was shot in a studio in Los Angeles, California and directed by Ray Kay. A behind the scenes look into creating the music video was released on April 29, 2009, showing interviews with the music video's director and the members of the group RichGirl. Member Lyndriette commented on the song's video stating "The hardest thing about training for this video was just [the] how physical it was, dancing and getting choreography and having to become a 'dancer' for that period of time before you actually go in the shoot."

The video seems to borrow aspects from Madonna's 1995 music video "Human Nature", in the concept of fashion and choreography used.

The music video for the single was released on May 22, 2009, revolving around the girls dressed in black costumes, dancing to the song in high spirit. The video begins with all the girls walking to the front of the frame wearing tight latex outfits. As the bass of the song increases the camera begins to shake and ceases whenever the base or vocals aren't as loud. The girls are later shown in full-length dancing, until the first verse starts. During Lyndriette's verse she is shown lying down in a large black square frame which cuts between her being in the frame by herself or with men or ladies of the group in it. The music video continues with each girl on top of a square figure during their verse. Seven and Audra pose in a white square frame that is standing up, and Brave sings her verse on top of a box that is being spun around by men as she keeps her face towards the camera. The music video ends with the girls walking away from the first shot as the lights close.

Daniel of MTV Buzzworthy gave the video a very positive review stating "This 'He Ain't Wit You Now (Tho)' clip is so off-the-charts summer stanknasty, we gotta do it backwards and roll it right now. As you heard in the video above, all this adds up to some serious heat." Daniel additionally complimented the girls by comparing their choreography to that of Michael Jackson and stating that they "create serious heat" once their vocals are added into the mix. Rap-Up called the video "high-gloss" during its premiere. Angel of ConcreteLoop favored the video, stating "They say the music biz goes in circles and it’s looking like the girl groups are definitely making a comeback." FADER complimented the song's accompanying video as "BANANAS," showing great anxiety over the group's future, before complimenting Rich Harrison on forming a group like this.

== Chart performance ==
The song debuted on the Billboard Hot R&B/Hip-Hop Songs at No. 96 on the week of August 8, 2009.

| Chart (2009) | Peak position |
|---|---|
| Billboard Hot Dance Club Play | 31 |
| Billboard Hot R&B/Hip-Hop Songs | 96 |

== Release history ==
Release dates, record label and format details
| Country | Date | Format | Label |
|---|---|---|---|
| United States | June 2, 2009 | Digital Download | Richcraft/Jive |
| United States | July 2009 | Rhythm | Richcraft/Jive |
| United States | July 2009 | Urban | Richcraft/Jive |
| United States | July 2009 | Urban Club | Richcraft/Jive |
