= RichGirl =

American girl group (active 2007–2011)

- Origin: Atlanta, Georgia, U.S.
- Genres: R&B; hip hop; pop
- Years active: 2007–2011
- Labels: Richcraft; RCA
- Past members: Audra Simmons; Christina "Brave" Williams; Kristal Lyndriette Smith; Amber "Sevyn" Streeter
- Website: http://www.myrichgirl.com

RichGirl was an American R&B vocal girl group, consisting of four members: Audra Simmons, Christina "Brave" Williams, Lyndriette Smith (now known as Kristal, a member of June's Diary) and Amber Streeter (now known as Sevyn Streeter). The group was formed with the help of record producer Rich Harrison, his respective record label Richcraft Entertainment, and was managed by Tina Davis.

Although the group never released a full debut LP, work on a self-titled debut album had begun in 2009. The group released two commercial singles, "He Ain't wit Me Now (Tho)" and "Swagger Right". The group released the mixtape Fall in Love with RichGirl on February 14, 2011. Following its release, the group disbanded.

== Music career ==
=== 2007–2008: Formation ===
RichGirl was formed with the help of Rich Harrison, and signed to his label Richcraft, and Jive Records in 2007. Lyndriette was signed to a production company at the age of 15 when she first met Harrison. They kept in contact, and when Harrison decided to start the group, he immediately offered her a spot, "He knew me so by the time the idea came to him, he had me in mind and offered me the position". Christina "Brave" Williams met Harrison at the age of 16, and was signed to his label as a solo artist. Amber "Sevyn" Streeter signed a deal with Interscope when she was 15 as a member of the Chris Stokes girl group, TG4, which disbanded before they could release an LP. Streeter was later discovered by Harrison on MySpace, and signed onto the RichCraft label as Se7en. Audra Simmons relocated to Los Angeles to launch a solo career and joined the group through an open audition. Audra said that she was "waiting tables by day and singing at night, that's when I found out about Richgirl ... I was the only girl they found through the actual auditioning process". Once RichGirl was formed, the members began living together in Atlanta.

=== 2009–2012: RichGirl EP, Fall in Love with RichGirl and disbandment ===
RichGirl began to work on their debut album in 2009, due for release early 2010. The group wrote several songs intended for the album and did their own vocal arrangements. In addition to Harrison, the group recorded with Bryan-Michael Cox and production duos The Underdogs, Dre & Vidal, and "KP" and Malay. The group performed at the annual Teen Takeover event in May 2009 and was an opening act for Beyoncé on her I Am ... Tour, for the North American Leg beginning on June 21, 2009, in New York.

RichGirl released the promotional single, "24's" featuring Bun B on February 5, 2009. The song peaked at number eighty-three on Billboard's Hot R&B/Hip-Hop Songs chart in 2009. The group released their official debut single, "He Ain't wit Me Now (Tho)" on June 2, 2009 which was accompanied with a music video directed by Ray Kay. The song debuted and peaked on the Billboard Hot R&B/Hip-Hop Songs at number ninety-six. On September 27, 2010, the group released the single "Swagger Right", featuring Fabolous and Rick Ross, which peaked at number seventy-two on the Billboard Hot R&B/Hip-Hop Songs chart. On September 9, 2009, RichGirl released a free EP through their official website.

Following a period of inactivity, the group's mixtape Fall in Love with RichGirl was released on Valentine's Day 2011 for free download on their official site. Following several solo releases from the group's members, on March 21, 2012, Sevyn confirmed her disbandment from the group. On April 24, 2012, Brave confirmed the group's separation.

== Artistry ==
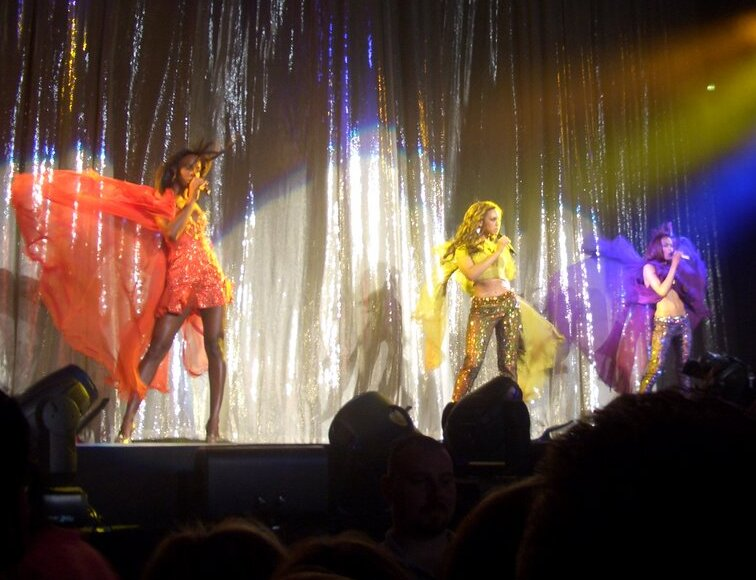
The group was compared to American R&B girl group Destiny's Child.

RichGirl's music is generally R&B, but also incorporates hip hop and pop. Known for their "powerful pipes," the group would cover songs such as Bruno Mars's "Grenade" and Lloyd's "Lay It Down". Specializing in mid-tempo tunes, the girls would take turns singing a song's melody and verse, later harmonizing over a song's chorus. Felipe Delerme of FADER showed appreciation for RichGirl for bring back the glory days of "Glam&B". Critics described the group as a "Voltron of sorts," noting that each member is individually talented.

The group's name refers to "a certain attitude and confidence, combined with individuality and talent that any girl might possess". Brave says that their sound is "very honest", and "each song tells a specific story". The singers described themselves as a cross between En Vogue and the Spice Girls, citing the individuality, but still being a whole. When first being reviewed by SESAC, Dan Kimpel described their image as "high-gloss." To accompany their personalities, their clothing styles differ among the group. Members Brave and Lyndriette created alter-egos for themselves, and introduced them on their YouTube channel on September 9, 2009. To promote the group's second single, "Swagger Right", the group released webisodes titled "The Swagger Series," featuring Lyndirette's alter-ego, Boomshika, in episode six.

== Discography ==
=== Official mixtapes ===
Year	Title	Notes
2011	Fall in Love with RichGirl: Released: February 14, 2011 (Valentine's Day); Label: Jive, RichCraft; Format: Digital download	Released for free download.; Features remixes including Waka Flocka Flame's "No Hands", Bruno Mars' "Grenade", Kanye West's "All of the Lights", Keri Hilson's "Pretty Girl Rock", and Usher's "DJ Got Us Fallin' in Love" + five original songs from the group.

=== Extended plays ===
List of EPs, with selected details
Title	EP details	Notes
RichGirl EP	Released: September 9, 2009; Format: Digital download	Free digital download.; Features the album's lead single "He Ain't wit Me Now (Tho)", "24's", and snippets of "Back 2 the Club", "Get Ya Swagga Right" and "Millionaire".

=== Singles ===
List of singles, with selected chart positions
Title	Year	Peak chart positions		Album
Title	Year	U.S. R&B	Hot Club	Album
"He Ain't wit Me Now (Tho)"	2009	96	31	RichGirl
"Swagger Right" (featuring Rick Ross and Fabolous)	2010	72	—	RichGirl
"—" denotes a title that did not chart, or was not released in that territory.

=== Promotional singles ===
Title	Year	Peak	Album
Title	Year	U.S. R&B	Album
"24's" (featuring Bun B.)	2009	68	RichGirl
"—" denotes a title that did not chart, or was not released in that territory.

=== Music videos ===
Year	Song	Director
2009	"Break Up"	Chris Robinson
2009	"He Ain't wit Me Now (Tho)"	Ray Kay
2010	"Swagger Right"	Colin Tilley

=== Other appearances ===
Year	Song	Album	Notes
2010	"Perfume"	In My Zone	Chris Brown featuring RichGirl
2010	"I Did It"	N/A	Usher featuring RichGirl
2011	"I Know"	Last Train to Paris	Diddy – Dirty Money featuring Chris Brown, Wiz Khalifa and Se7en of RichGirl (Note: Se7en is credited in the album's liner notes.)

=== Unreleased songs ===
#	Song	Artist(s)	Writer(s)	Leaked	Ref.
1	"Angel"	RichGirl	Mikkel Stoleer Eriksen; Tor Erik Hermansen; Sandy Vee	Yes	
2	"Back to the Club"	RichGirl	Steve Russell; Eric Dawkins; Antonio Dixon; Harvey Mason, Jr. Damon Thomas	Yes	
3	"Beat of My Heart"	RichGirl	Harvey Mason, Jr.	Yes	
4	"Betta Not Do it"	RichGirl	Rich Harrison	No	
5	"Better Days"	RichGirl	Dwayne Baxter; Nelson Bridges; Bradrick Gregory	Yes	
6	"Blowin' Up Phones" (Note: "Blowin' Up Phones" samples "Tik Tok" by Ke$ha.)	RichGirl (featuring Kesha)	Rich Harrison	Yes	
7	"Can't Shake"	RichGirl	Ester Dean	Yes	
8	"Can U Afford Me"	RichGirl	Unknown	Yes	
9	"Dance For Me"	RichGirl	James Fauntleroy; Harvey Mason Jr. Damon Thomas	Yes	
10	"Everything I Do"	RichGirl	Unknown	Yes	
11	"Foolish"	RichGirl	Rich Harrison	Yes	
12	"For You"	RichGirl (featuring Chris Brown)	Chris Brown	Yes	
13	"Got Away"	RichGirl	Unknown	Yes	
14	"Honeycomb"	RichGirl	Unknown	Yes	
15	"Itty Bitty"	RichGirl	Rich Harrison	Yes	
16	"Lucky You Are"	RichGirl	James Fauntleroy; Warren "Oak" Felder; Harvey Mason, Jr.	Yes	
17	"Millionaire"	RichGirl	Rich Harrison	Yes	
18	"Move on Me" (Note: "Move On Me" was rerecorded by Fantasia Barrino for her album Back to Me (2010).)	RichGirl	Jessy Wilson; Malay; KP	Yes	
19	"Need Me Some Love"	RichGirl	Dwayne Baxter; Nelson Bridges; Bradrick Gregory	Yes	
20	"Officially the Enemy"	RichGirl	Malay; KP	Yes	
21	"Own It"	RichGirl	Faløn King; Rich King; Antwoine "Troy NoKā" Collins	Yes	
22	"Pimp Cup" (Note: An alternate version of "Pimp Cup" exists, which features only RichGirl.)	RichGirl (featuring Snoop Dogg)	Rich Harrison; Calvin Cordozar Broadus, Jr.	Yes	
23	"Selfish"	RichGirl	Faløn King; Kevin Cossom; Jermaine Jackson; Andrew Harr	Yes	
24	"Shut Up Boy"	RichGirl (featuring Ne-Yo)	Shaffer Smith; Bei Maejor	Yes	
25	"Take Over Me"	RichGirl	Evan Bogart; David "DQ" Quinones; Erika Nuri-Taylor; Warren Felder	Yes	
26	"Tin Cup"	RichGirl	Unknown	No	
27	"Tonight"	RichGirl	Rico Love; Mikkel Stoleer Eriksen; Tor Erik Hermansen	Yes	
28	"Treasures" (Note: "Treasures" samples "Fergalicious" by Fergie.)	RichGirl (featuring Fergie)	Jordan Suecof; Antario Holmes; Stacy Ferguson	Yes	
29	"Trouble" (Note: An alternate demo version of "Trouble" exists, which features only RichGirl.)	RichGirl (featuring Gucci Mane and Yo Gotti)	Sean Garrett; Shondrae "Mr. Bangladesh" Crawford	Yes	
30	"Uncharted Waters" (Note: An alternate version of "Uncharted Waters" exists, which features only RichGirl.)	RichGirl	Lester "L2" Shaw; Bryan Michael Cox	Yes	

== Tours ==
Opening act

- 2009: I Am... World Tour (Beyoncé)
- 2009: BK Family Live Tour (Mario)
