= Grenade (song) =

2010 song by Bruno Mars

Single by Bruno Mars

from the album Doo-Wops & Hooligans
- Released: October 2010
- Genre: Pop; power pop
- Length: 3:42
- Label: Elektra
- Songwriters: Bruno Mars; Philip Lawrence; Ari Levine; Brody Brown; Claude Kelly; Andrew Wyatt
- Producer: The Smeezingtons

Bruno Mars singles chronology
"Just the Way You Are" (2010)	"Grenade" (2010)	"The Lazy Song" (2011)

Music video
- "Grenade" on YouTube

"Grenade" is a song by American singer and songwriter Bruno Mars from his debut studio album, Doo-Wops & Hooligans (2010). The pop and power pop song was written and produced by the Smeezingtons (Mars, Phillip Lawrence, Ari Levine) with additional songwriting by Brody Brown, Claude Kelly, and Andrew Wyatt. The song was developed from an unreleased track with similar lyrical themes. "Grenade" was completely rearranged and re‑recorded two days before the album "was supposed to be handed in". The lyrics carry a message of unrequited love and how Mars's heart was broken, despite his best efforts to show her his love. Elektra Records released the song as the second promotional single and as the second official single, to contemporary hit and rhythmic contemporary stations in the United States in October 2010.

"Grenade" was well received by critics, praising the vocals, emotional lyrics of the song and considering it one of the stand-out tracks on Doo-Wops & Hooligans. The single reached number one in fifteen countries, giving Mars his third number one single on the Billboard Hot 100, and topping the Canadian Hot 100 for three non-consecutive weeks. "Grenade" was certified sixteen times platinum by the Recording Industry Association of America (RIAA), diamond by Music Canada (MC) and seven times platinum by the Australian Recording Industry Association (ARIA). It was the second best selling digital single of 2011 with 10.2 million copies.

The music video, directed by Nabil Elderkin, was released on November 19, 2010. In the video, Mars is seen dragging an upright piano through Los Angeles. By the time he arrives at the home of his beloved, he discovers she is with another man, so he decides to leave and ends up killing himself. Mars performed "Grenade" on the Late Show with David Letterman and during all his tours since 2010. The song has been covered by a variety of performers. It was nominated for both Record of the Year and Song of the Year at the 54th Annual Grammy Awards.

== Background and writing ==
In an interview with Idolator, Bruno Mars revealed the song's conception and inspiration, saying that he was with his friend Benny Blanco and he was playing a couple of songs to Mars, including one which lyrics were similar to the ones in "Grenade". Blanco added that the band to which the song belonged was not signed and the CD was not released. Mars replied, "I can relate to that so much, I want to take that and make it my own". Mars confessed that the song was inspired by "his love for a girl who did not love him back". He admitted to be "a bit of a drama queen in that song" and that the track was therapeutic to him. Afterwards, Blanco contacted Mars, who started writing his version.

It's a heartbreaking, heartbreak song, and I think everyone can relate to that. You're so in love with this woman and you don't understand, 'What am I doing wrong? What am I not giving to you? I'll go as far as putting a bullet in my brain for you, and why can't I get that kind of love in return?'

In the same interview, the singer expressed the desire to release the song as a single, claiming it was a "personal favourite". Ari Levine said the writing of "Grenade" was among the most difficult songs in the album since it took several months to complete. The team also said that the last line of the song was the conflict since it took two months for them to come up with "but you won't do the same". In May 2018, Claude Kelly stated in an interview that he was invited to the studio by Mars, as the singer wanted to collaborate with him. Once in the studio, he noticed Mars giving a hard time to one of his music partners, Philip Lawrence. The latter was once in a relationship with a girl that "he would do everything for" and received nothing in return. They started to throw extreme examples such as "you jump out of a plane" or "a shark would eat you" which they found amusing and started to write them on a list, "I'd jump out in front of a train, throw my hand on a blade, get hit by a bus". Eventually, they realized it was "catchy".

== Development and conception ==
The original version of "Grenade" had an "uptempo 1960s surf-style sound with jangle pop" and before a live show in New York, Mars "slowed and stripped it down". The reworked song was the last track added to the album. In an interview with Sound on Sound, Levine, who carried out the recording and instrumentation on "Grenade", explained that the song was originally recorded with "a more guitar‑based arrangement", 15bpm faster. According to Mars, the record was much happier. Mars ended up by playing the song live in showcase for the label and to several booking agents in a slower tempo. The singer and his bandmates rehearsed a lot to that show, yet "Grenade" "sounded terrible". Mars decided to do a "stripped down" version by playing the guitar, while Brody Brown played the piano. The single received praise from the label. The Smeezingtons completely rearranged and re‑recorded it, including the vocals, "two days before the album was supposed to be handed in". Levine, added, "There was quite a bit of deadline stress involved in that". The latter explained which instruments and software were involved in the song:

The drums in ‘Grenade’ came from a combination of my MPC and some software drums, and I created the piano sound in the Fantom. The rest of the synth sounds came from the Virus, and I use the V‑synth and the MicroKorg on pretty much everything. Bruno and I played the keyboards and Brown played the bass. He's an incredible musician who has a great feel and he can play everything.

== Production and release ==
"Grenade" was written and produced by the Smeezingtons (Mars, Lawrence, Levine) with additional songwriting by Brown, Kelly, and Andrew Wyatt. The song was mixed at Larrabee Recording Studios Los Angeles by Manny Marroquin, with Christian Plata and Erik Madrid serving as the assistants. It was engineered at Levcon Studios in Los Angeles, California by Levine. The latter along with Mars and Brown played all the instruments on the track and recorded them. It was mastered by Stephen Marcussen at Marcussen Mastering in Hollywood, California.

"Grenade" leaked on September 22, 2010, a week before its initial release on September 28, 2010, as the second and final promotional single by Elektra Records. It was issued as an iTunes Store-exclusive before the Doo-Wops & Hooligans album release on October 4, 2010. On October 21, 2010, in an interview with Digital Spy, Mars revealed the intention to follow "Just the Way You Are" with "Grenade". Later, during an interview with Los Angeles Times, Mars confessed he was anxious regarding the song's reception. According to Billboard, the song was sent to American contemporary hit radio and rhythmic contemporary stations in October 2010 by Elektra; the exact radio impact date is unknown. On January 10, 2011, the track was released via digital download in the United Kingdom. On February 4, 2011, it was released a CD single, which included a Carl Louis & Martin Danielle Classic Mix of "Just the Way You Are" and "Grenade".

== Composition and lyrics ==
Grenade
An 18-second sample of the chorus of "Grenade", where Mars sings what he would do for the girl he loves.

"Grenade" is a pop and power-pop song with instrumentation that features keyboards, drums and bass. The song is set in the key of D minor and was published with a moderate tempo of 108 beats per minute. Mars's vocals span from A_{3} to D_{5}. It has a "powerful kick/bass combination", and competent vocals, mainly in the chorus. A "snare" can be heard when the second verse begins. Mars's vocals have been described as "pure and clean ... over a pounding drum beat". Spencer Hawk from Little Village wrote that the song "doesn't rely on a hook, and it's mostly Mars' voice with a simple piano riff and a pulsing drum beat".

According to The New York Times music reviewer, Jon Caramanica, the song contains elements of 1980s pop and is accompanied by drums similar to those used by Kanye West. Mike Senior of Sound on Sound said that the "piano riff sounded like Coldplay's "Clocks"." The New Zealand Herald's Scott Kara described its beats as "Shakira-esque". Both Roberto Mucciacciaro for MTV and Robert Copsey from Digital Spy noticed the similarities with Michael Jackson's "Dirty Diana". The later describe it as an "haunting piano melody and thunderous drum claps". On the other hand, Tony Clayton-Lea of The Irish Times believed that the structure of "Grenade" resembled the one in "Just the Way You Are".

Lyrically, the song contains masochistic themes and tells the story of heartbreak caused by a failed relationship: "Gave you all I had / And you tossed it in the trash". The chorus has Mars singing, "I'd catch a grenade for ya," and speaks of unrequited love when the subject girl of his affections "won't do the same". Tim Byron, writer for The Vine, "'Grenade' is about the feeling of withdrawal". The critic added, "Mars knows she is bad for him, that's she's preventing him from thinking straight, that he can't actually have her the way he wants, but he still nonetheless has crazy desires for that rush of romantic cocaine that he gets from her." Mars commented in an interview to Blues & Soul: "'Grenade' represents the OTHER side of love – where you're in love with a woman and you know for a fact that she doesn't love you the way you love HER."

== Reception ==
=== Critical ===
The song received generally positive reviews from most music critics. Robert Copsey of Digital Spy gave a review of four stars out of five, praising Mars's vocals, "Mars has the vocal chops ... to carry that off", and emotional lyrics. The latter reminiscent was also noted by Roberto Mucciacciaro for MTV, who added that the song was coincidentally covered on several occasions by Mars. Entertainment Weekly's Leah Greenblatt called "Grenade" the "atmospheric opener" of Mars's debut studio album, adding that is a "captivating masochist's anthem", enjoying it as one of the album's highlights, as did The Washington Post's Sean Fennessey. Rolling Stone's Jody Rosen recommended it as proof of Mars's capabilities as a "lavishly gifted melodist". Tom Gockelen-Kozlowski of The Daily Telegraph complimented "the Kanye West-style genre-bending on Grenade". Consequence of Sound's Kevin Barber praised the track and Mars, since it "showcases his Michael Jackson-esque vocal range" and its "heavy, heartbreaking lyrics". Ken Tucker for NPR noticed "it's hard to resist the clever come-on refrain of "Grenade" – "I'd catch a grenade for ya", adding the song had a "creamy melody".

Tony Clayton-Lea of The Irish Times praised "Grenade", saying "the kind of song that JLS and their ilk would chop off their dancing legs for." However, Slant's Eric Henderson dismissed its unrealistic lyrics, while AllMusic's Tim Sendra thought the song was "over-the-top"—one of the weaker ones on the album. Spencer Hawk from Little Village criticized the song by calling it "fairly innovative" and notice that the shouting of the lyrics "doesn't feel genuine", however he felt that "it's very safe while being a little risky, and Mars is a solid singer". The Scotsman dubbed the track a "boy band missile which is a touch desperate in its overwrought overtures to a girl who wouldn't piss on him if he was on fire". Music-News.com, reviewer David Spencer, stated "great pop but little in way of surprise". In 2019, Nerisha Penrose from Elle said "Grenade" was one of the 52 Best Songs That Defined the 2010s, ranking it at number two. She said that the "raw, somber ballad is easily the highlight of Bruno's career and is what helped catapult him to fame."

=== Accolades ===
"Grenade" received several nominations. In 2011, it was nominated for Choice Music: Break-Up Song at the 2011 Teen Choice Awards, and at the 2011 MTV Europe Music Awards, the song received a nomination in the category of Best Song. In the same year, it received a nomination for The Record of the Year ceremony. In 2012, "Grenade" was nominated for three Grammy Awards, including: Record of the Year, Song of the Year, and the newly introduced Best Pop Solo Performance, losing all of them to British singer Adele. In the same year, the single received a nomination for "Best Hit International" at the Swiss Music Awards. At the 2012 ASCAP Pop Music Awards, the song was one of the winners of Most Performed Songs.

== Commercial performance ==
=== North America ===
"Grenade" debuted on the Billboard Hot 100 the week of October 16, 2010 at number 81 and climbed the chart to number five for the week ending December 18, 2010. On January 8, 2011, it peaked at number one, making it Mars's third number one single on the chart, the others being B.o.B's "Nothin' on You", on which he was featured, and "Just the Way You Are". The peak position was reached due to 559,000 downloads and 89 million listener impressions, taking Digital Gainer and Airplay Gainer awards. Around this time, the song had become his second solo single to top the 2 million mark in downloads. The song dropped and rose back to the top spot two more times, making it, at that time, one of only six singles in Billboard history to have three distinct runs at number one. In February, it topped the 3 million mark. The song spent 36 weeks on the Hot 100. As of October 2015, the song has sold 6.1 million digital copies in the United States. On October 17, 2025, the single was certified sixteen times platinum by the Recording Industry Association of America (RIAA). It was Mars's second single to sell over 5 million, just a week after "Just the Way You Are" achieved that feat, and it was only the third time in Billboard history that back-to-back singles have both sold 5 million copies in the digital era. The song peaked at number one in Canada. It replaced "The Time (Dirty Bit)" by The Black Eyed Peas, before being dethroned by "Hold It Against Me" by Britney Spears. On February 12, 2011, it took the top spot from Usher's song "More". Two weeks later, it was replaced by Lady Gaga's "Born This Way". It has been certified diamond by Music Canada (MC).

=== Europe and Oceania ===
In Australia, it debuted at number 48 in the ARIA Singles Chart and five weeks later reached number one, taking "The Time (Dirty Bit)" by The Black Eyed Peas from the top spot. On its second run in Australia, it dethroned "Who's That Girl" by Guy Sebastian featuring Eve, thus being replaced by the same a week later. After its success in the country, Australian Recording Industry Association (ARIA) certified it seven times platinum. In the first week in the UK, the song topped the chart, becoming Mars's third number one with a total of 159,000 copies sold, blocking Lady Gaga's "Born This Way". Thus, Mars achieved the best opening week of January on the list since 1996 when "Spaceman" by Babylon Zoo debuted with 383,000 units. The recording has been certified four times platinum by the British Phonographic Industry (BPI). According to the Official Charts Company, the single has reached a total of 1.53 million chart sales, including 64 million streams, as of January 2021. In Austria, the song reached the second position and remained there for three non-consecutive weeks. The song was eventually certified Platinum by IFPI Austria. In Germany, the song debuted at 8, and three weeks later reached the top spot, where it stayed for six non-consecutive weeks. Then, Bundesverband Musikindustrie (BVMI) gave Mars three gold records for the sale of 450,000 downloads.

In New Zealand, the song spent twenty-nine weeks on the chart and it was number one for three consecutive dates, after taking "The Time (Dirty Bit)" by The Black Eyed Peas from the top spot. "Grenade" had sales and stream figures of 180,000 copies and was certified six times platinum by the Recorded Music NZ (RMNZ). Other countries where the song rose to the top include Norway and Denmark. As of February 4, 2011, the song spent four weeks on the top of the Irish Singles Chart, replacing Matt Cardle's "When We Collide" on its first week. On the Swedish music chart, "Grenade" dethroned "Born This Way" by Lady Gaga (on its second run at number one). On the Swiss Singles Chart, it replaced the duet between Diddy-Dirty Money and Skylar Grey's "Coming Home". It was certified three times platinum by the IFPI Switzerland. In the two regions of Belgium, the song reached the top ten and received a gold certification in the Ultratop 50 Flanders. In Slovakia and Finland, the song peaked at number 3, while on the Dutch Top 40, the song peaked at number 2. Nevertheless, the success of "Grenade" was lower in other countries; it just spent two weeks on the Japan Hot 100 chart and it peaked at number 36. Despite its low reception in Spain, peaking at number 21, the song was the ninth most played song on the Spotify streaming service in 2011.

Mars was the first male artist in 13 years to reach the top spot in the US and UK with his first two headline singles. "Grenade" reached number one in fourteen charts and sold 10.2 million digital copies in 2011, making it the second most sold single of that year, after Mars's "Just the Way You Are".

== Music video ==
=== Development and synopsis ===
Mars dragging a piano in the video

Nabil Elderkin directed the music video for the song, which was shot in Los Angeles. In a behind-the-scenes video, Mars explained, "The concept of the video is my struggle, to tell this girl I'd do anything for her, so I'm going as far as dragging a piano to get to her just so I can sing my heart out." Mars, sarcastically, replied to rumors related to the use of special effects: "A lot of people think this is a camera trick, but that is a heavy piano. Luckily, I’ve been doing about, you know, 800 to 967 push-ups every day, so it's not a big deal, I can handle it." Regardless of this achievement, Mars was cautious: "The actions in this video serve as a metaphor, and should not be taken literally. I am aware of the power of visual media, and I encourage everyone who watches this video to understand that it is an artistic interpretation of the song, and not something to imitate".

The music video was released on November 19, 2010 on MTV and MTV.com. and it involves Mars's efforts to sing to a woman he loves after dragging an upright piano with a rope tied to it through Los Angeles. Scenes also feature the singer singing in a dark bedroom, looking out of a rainy window. He wears a suit and encounters a gang and a pit bull along the way. When he reaches the woman's house and finds out she is with another man, he drags himself and the piano in front of a train to attempt suicide. As the train approaches Bruno at full speed, the screen cuts to black, and the video ends.

=== Reception ===
The video received mixed reviews by critics. Robbie Daw of Idolator complemented the video by saying that the "standout track from Doo-Wops & Hooligans, and it's given an extra sheen thanks to a quirky, unconventional video that doesn't shy away from the dark tone of the song's lyrics". James Montgomery of MTV News gave a mixed review on the video, in which he said "after all, it would’ve been easy – and expected – to make something slick, sexy and/or saccharine, a glossy thing where he croons from a rooftop somewhere, removes his shirt, and somehow ends up with the girl. None of that happens here. Rather, we see Mars struggling and sweating, being taunted and tempted, falling and rising again ... He ends up alone, unloved. He probably gets flattened by a train". On another review by Montgomery, the singer's redemption is referred because Mars "distances himself from his smoove-crooning contemporaries, and he does it simply by being real. Really dramatic, really emotional, really clever. This one's a winner, even if, at the end of it, Mars has lost everything."

The video itself earned Mars three nominations at the 2011 MTV Video Music Awards, in Best Male Video, Best Pop Video and Video of the Year. In 2011, the video was one of the most seen online in the United Kingdom. Mark Graham for VH1 ranked the video as the second best of 2011; the top spot went for "Rolling in the Deep" by Adele. The video reached 1 billion views on YouTube in March 2021.

== Cover versions and remixes ==
Some artists made their own versions and remixes of the song. The American group Boyce Avenue covered "Grenade" and included it in their sixth EP, Acoustic Sessions, Vol. 1, released on December 6, 2010. American singer-songwriter Gavin Mikhail included his version of the song and its instrumental on his Bruno Mars covers album. On November 2, 2011, a cover by Trackstarz charted at number 56 on the UK Singles Chart. American rapper Lil Wayne published the first official remix of the song on February 12, 2011. The remix is identical to the original song, except for the 16-bar introduction verse that Wayne provides. Mars was so surprised with the remix when he saw it online, he recalls "I was like, ‘What? Press play". He called it, "Awesome". MTV critique, Jayson Rodriguez, described it as "Lil Wayne delivering a spoken word-style flow, expressing devotion for his love interest". RichGirl, an R&B girl group, created a remix to the song, released on their Fall in Love with RichGirl mixtape.

Nathaniel Drew and Salt Lake Pops Orchestra remixed the song with the vocal collaboration of Alex Boye and Lindsey Stirling; it was released as a single on July 13, 2012. Gerrie van Dijk-Dantuma and Michelle Chamuel, contestants on The Voice of Holland and its US version, respectively, sang the theme for the competition and released it digitally through iTunes. Japanese singer Gille included her version of the track on her debut EP Lead the Way, released on May 16, 2012. Will Chase, who guest starred as Michael Swift in the TV series Smash, sang the song during the episode titled "Enter Mr. DiMaggio", which originally aired on February 29, 2012.

American metalcore band Memphis May Fire covered the track for the compilation album Punk Goes Pop 5, which was released on November 4, 2012. The song was officially released for digital download on October 2, 2012. In order to celebrate fifteen years in the music industry, Dutch symphonic metal band Within Temptation covered several songs by other artists, including "Grenade", during a special program on the Belgian radio station Q music, called Within Temptation Friday. The band chose this song because "it's a really good song and instead of making a grenade go off on stage, we figured we'd make a bomb of astonishment go off in the studio", in the words of the lead vocalist Sharon den Adel. On April 19, 2013, Within Temptation's cover was released and available for download as part of their cover album The Q-Music Sessions. Nevertheless, the song peaked at number 73 in their home country, on the Dutch Charts. In 2016, Postmodern Jukebox also covered "Grenade", evoking a '60s sound, featuring Brielle Von Hugel in the lead vocals. It is featured on the former's album Swing the Vote! In 2020, American singer-songwriter Enisa covered "Grenade" as part of the tenth anniversary of Mars's debut album.

== Live performances ==
Mars performed the song at the Bowery Ballroom in New York City on August 25, 2010, with him and his four-piece band dressed in blue tuxedos and black skinny ties. John Macdonald for Spin said "Despite a couple pitch problems here and there, Mars proved to be nearly as good a performer as he is a songwriter". The song was also performed in a similar manner on the October 10, 2010 episode of Saturday Night Live, as part of a segue from "Nothin' on You", the debut single was also performed. His performance was well received by critics. Billboard's magazine critique Walter Frazier analysed the performance and commented "Mars' backing band ... dressed as a 1950s rockabilly group, while Mars resembled something of a modern-day Elvis, surely inspiring swoons for the "SNL" audience." The performance was also praised by MTV's Mawuse Ziegbe, who wrote: "Mars peppered the performance with hip-swaying moves Elvis would be proud of and wrapped up the set in classic rock-star style with an enthusiastic jump in the air." On October 21, 2010, a soulful arrangement of the song was sung for a Billboard Tastemakers video session. Additionally, Mars performed on the Late Show with David Letterman on November 11, 2010, with a soul redemption of "Grenade" accompanied by an all-female string section. Robbie Draw from website Idolator wrote a positive review, commenting "Bruno Mars hit up the Late Show With David Letterman last night and left a piece of his heart on the stage after turning out an emotional, bluesy rendition of his new single".

The song was performed at NBC's The Today Show on November 22, 2010, as part of the Toyota Concert Series and at the 2010 Soul Train Music Awards on November 28, 2010. On January 6, 2011, Mars performed "Grenade" on The Ellen DeGeneres Show with a guitar, "backed by three background singers, a strings section, and pianist". He also performed the song on the Dutch television show The Voice of Holland on January 21, 2011. On February 16, 2011, he performed the song live at the 2011 Grammy Awards, along with B.o.B. and Janelle Monáe. In Germany, Mars performed "Grenade" on Wetten, dass..? and at the Echo Awards, on March 19 and 28, 2011, respectively. It was performed as encore on his debut world tour, The Doo-Wops & Hooligans Tour (2011–12), and was the twelfth song of the set list on the Hooligans in Wondaland Tour (2011). At this time, Mars expressed his apprehension about performing the song because fans had thrown dummy grenades on stage, some of which were metal and posed a safety hazard. The track was also part of his second and third world tours, The Moonshine Jungle Tour (2013–14) and the 24K Magic World Tour (2017–18), respectively. During The Late Late Show with James Corden on December 13, 2016, Mars included "Grenade" on the popular segment Carpool Karaoke. The track was part of the Bruno Mars Live (2022–2024) set list.

== The Grenade Sessions ==
The Grenade Sessions, a collection of remixes for "Grenade", was first released through Elektra Records on February 8, 2011, for digital download. It features production from The Smeezingtons, The Hooligans and Passion Pit. It features four different versions of "Grenade" and its music video. The original version of "Grenade", a remix by The Hooligans, titled "Catch a Grenade", which embodies portions of "I'll Fight" (2009) performed by Wilco and written by Jeff Tweedy, thus credit was given to the latter. It also features a remix by Passion Pit and an acoustic version of the song.

In 2011, a CD single with the same four versions of "Grenade" from the first compilation was released in Italy. On April 21, 2012, the compilation was re-released as The Grenade Sessions 10" vinyl single by Atlantic Records as part of Mars's contribution to Record Store Day. This contains the same tracks and an additional bonus poster.

The Grenade Sessions EP
No.	Title	Length
1.	"Grenade"	3:42
2.	"Catch a Grenade" (The Hooligans Remix)	3:30
3.	"Grenade" (Passion Pit Remix)	6:10
4.	"Grenade" (Acoustic)	4:09
5.	"Grenade" (Music video)	3:40

== Track listing ==
Digital download
No.	Title	Length
1.	"Grenade"	3:42

CD Single
No.	Title	Length
1.	"Grenade"	3:42
2.	"Just The Way You Are" (Carl Louis & Martin Danielle Classic Mix)	5:17

== Personnel ==
Credits adapted from the liner notes of Doo-Wops & Hooligans.

- Bruno Mars – lead vocals, instrumentation, songwriting
- Philip Lawrence – songwriting
- Ari Levine – engineer, instrumentation, songwriting
- Brody Brown – instrumentation, songwriting
- The Smeezingtons – production
- Claude Kelly – songwriting
- Andrew Wyatt – songwriting
- Manny Marroquin – mixing
- Christian Plata – mixing assistant
- Erik Madrid – mixing assistant
- Stephen Marcussen – mastering

== Charts ==
=== Weekly charts ===
List of chart positions
Chart (2010–2011)	Peak position
Australia (ARIA)	1
Austria (Ö3 Austria Top 40)	2
Belgium (Ultratop 50 Flanders)	3
Belgium (Ultratop 50 Wallonia)	6
Canada Hot 100 (Billboard)	1
Canada AC (Billboard)	1
Canada CHR/Top 40 (Billboard)	1
Canada Hot AC (Billboard)	1
Czech Republic Airplay (ČNS IFPI)	1
Denmark (Tracklisten)	1
Finland (Suomen virallinen lista)	3
France (SNEP)	7
Germany (GfK)	1
Hungary (Rádiós Top 40)	4
Hungary (Single Top 40)	4
Ireland (IRMA)	1
Israel International Airplay (Media Forest)	1
Italy (FIMI)	8
Luxembourg Digital Songs Sales (Billboard)	2
Mexico (Billboard Ingles Airplay)	6
Mexico Anglo (Monitor Latino)	14
Netherlands (Dutch Top 40)	2
Netherlands (Single Top 100)	3
New Zealand (Recorded Music NZ)	1
Norway (VG-lista)	1
Poland Airplay (ZPAV)	1
Portugal Digital Songs Sales (Billboard)	4
Russia Airplay (TopHit)	7
Scottish Singles Sales (Official Charts)	1
Slovakia Airplay (ČNS IFPI)	3
Spain (Promusicae)	25
Sweden (Sverigetopplistan)	1
Switzerland (Schweizer Hitparade)	1
UK Singles (Official Charts)	1
Ukraine Airplay (TopHit)	9
US Billboard Hot 100	1
US Adult Contemporary (Billboard)	11
US Adult Pop Airplay (Billboard)	3
US Dance Airplay (Billboard)	9
US Hot Latin Songs (Billboard)	37
US Pop Airplay (Billboard)	1
US Rhythmic Airplay (Billboard)	1

List of chart positions
Chart (2012)	Peak position
Japan Hot 100 (Billboard)	36
South Korea International Singles (Gaon)	15

List of chart position
Chart (2013)	Peak position
Slovenia (SloTop50)	16

List of chart position
Chart (2024)	Peak position
Singapore (RIAS)	16

List of chart positions
Chart (2026)	Peak position
Global 200 (Billboard)	117
Portugal (AFP)	161

List of chart position for Trackstarz version
Chart (2011)	Peak position
UK Singles (Official Charts)	56

List of chart positions for Within Temptation version
Chart (2012)	Peak position
Belgium (Ultratip Bubbling Under Wallonia)	5
Netherlands (Single Top 100)	73

=== Year-end charts ===
List of chart positions
Chart (2010)	Position
Australia (ARIA)	32
Netherlands (Dutch Top 40)	188
New Zealand (Recorded Music NZ)	26
Sweden (Sverigetopplistan)	94

List of chart positions
Chart (2011)	Position
Australia (ARIA)	21
Austrian (Ö3 Austria Top 40)	11
Belgium (Ultratop Flanders)	12
Belgium (Ultratop Wallonia)	31
Brazil (Crowley)	61
Canada (Canadian Hot 100)	7
Denmark (Hitlisten)	4
Germany (Media Control AG)	3
Hungary (Rádiós Top 40)	10
Israel (Media Forest)	16
Italy (Musica e dischi)	38
Netherlands (Dutch Top 40)	9
Netherlands (Single Top 100)	9
New Zealand (Recorded Music NZ)	20
Russia Airplay (TopHit)	10
Sweden (Sverigetopplistan)	5
Switzerland (Schweizer Hitparade)	5
Ukraine Airplay (TopHit)	33
UK Singles (Official Charts Company)	7
US Billboard Hot 100	6
US Adult Top 40 (Billboard)	12
US Adult Contemporary (Billboard)	22
US Mainstream Top 40 (Billboard)	6
US Rhythmic (Billboard)	13

=== Decade-end charts ===
List of chart position
Chart (2010–2019)	Position
US Billboard Hot 100	54

=== All-time charts ===
List of chart position
Charts	Position
Switzerland (Schweizer Hitparade)	140

== Certifications ==
List of certifications
Region	Certification	Certified units/sales
Australia (ARIA)	7× Platinum	490,000^{‡}
Austria (IFPI Austria)	Platinum	30,000^{*}
Belgium (BRMA)	Gold	15,000^{*}
Canada (Music Canada)	Diamond	800,000^{‡}
Denmark (IFPI Danmark)	4× Platinum	360,000^{‡}
France (SNEP)	Platinum	200,000^{‡}
Germany (BVMI)	3× Gold	450,000^{^}
Italy (FIMI)	Platinum	30,000^{*}
Mexico (AMPROFON)	Gold	30,000^{*}
New Zealand (RMNZ)	6× Platinum	180,000^{‡}
Portugal (AFP)	2× Platinum	50,000^{‡}
Spain (Promusicae)	Platinum	60,000^{‡}
Switzerland (IFPI Switzerland)	3× Platinum	90,000^{^}
United Kingdom (BPI)	4× Platinum	2,400,000^{‡}
United States (RIAA)	16× Platinum	16,000,000^{‡}
Streaming
Denmark (IFPI Danmark)	Platinum	100,000^{†}
^{*} Sales figures based on certification alone.^{^} Shipments figures based on certification alone.^{‡} Sales+streaming figures based on certification alone.^{†} Streaming-only figures based on certification alone.

== Release history ==
=== Promotional release ===
List of release history showing region, date, format, and label
Region	Date	Format	Label	Ref.
Various	September 28, 2010	Digital download (iTunes countdown single)	Elektra	

=== Single release ===
List of release history showing region(s), date(s), format(s) and label(s)
Region	Date	Format	Label	Ref.
United States	October 2010	Contemporary hit radio	Elektra	
United States	October 2010	Rhythmic contemporary	Elektra	
United Kingdom	January 10, 2011	Digital download	Unknown	
Germany	February 4, 2011	CD single	Elektra	
Austria	February 4, 2011	CD single	Elektra	
Switzerland	February 4, 2011	CD single	Elektra	

== See also ==
- List of best-selling singles
- List of best-selling singles in Australia
- List of best-selling singles in the United States
- List of Hot 100 number-one singles of 2011 (U.S.)
- List of Billboard Rhythmic number-one songs of the 2010s
- List of Hot 100 number-one singles of 2011 (Canada)
- List of Mainstream Top 40 number-one hits of 2011 (U.S.)
- List of number-one hits of 2011 (Germany)
- List of number-one singles and albums of 2011 (Ireland)
- List of number-one singles from the 2010s (New Zealand)
- List of number-one singles of 2010 (Australia)
- List of number-one singles of 2011 (Poland)
- List of UK Singles Chart number ones of the 2010s
