= Touch (Amerie song) =

2005 single by Amerie

Single by Amerie

from the album Touch
- Released: May 31, 2005
- Studio: Sony Music (New York City)
- Genre: Crunk&B
- Length: 3:38
- Label: Columbia
- Songwriters: Amerie Rogers; Jonathan Smith; Sean Garrett; Craig Love; LaMarquis Jefferson; James "LRoc" Phillips
- Producer: Jonathan "Lil Jon" Smith

Amerie singles chronology
"1 Thing" (2005)	"Touch" (2005)	"Talkin' About" (2005)

T.I. singles chronology
"Round Here" (2005)	""Touch" (Remix)" (2005)	"Front Back" (2005)

"Touch" is a song by American singer Amerie from her second studio album of the same name (2005). Written by Amerie, Lil Jon, Sean Garrett, Craig Love, LRoc, and LaMarquis Jefferson and produced by Lil Jon, the track was released on May 31, 2005, as the album's second single. While "Touch" reached the top 20 in the United Kingdom and Ireland and number 33 in Australia, it failed to match the success of "1 Thing" in the United States, missing the Billboard Hot 100 and reaching number 95 on the Billboard Hot R&B/Hip-Hop Songs chart.

== Track listings ==
- UK CD 1
1. "Touch" (album version) – 3:38
2. "Touch" (Partners in Rhyme Mix featuring T.I.) – 3:59
3. "Touch" (The Milk Bros Remix featuring T.I.) – 7:51
4. "Touch" (instrumental) – 3:31
5. "Touch" (video)
- UK CD 2
1. "Touch" (album version) – 3:38
2. "Touch" (Remix featuring T.I.) – 3:23
3. "Touch" (Touch This Remix)
4. "Touch" (Touch This Remix radio edit)
5. "Touch" (video)
- US 12-inch single

A1. "Touch" (remix featuring T.I.) – 3:23
A2. "Touch" (remix a capella featuring T.I.) – 3:21
B1. "Touch" (instrumental) – 3:31
B2. "Touch" (album version) – 3:38

- US digital single
1. "Touch" (album version) – 3:38
2. "Touch" (remix featuring T.I.)

== Charts ==
=== Weekly charts ===
Weekly chart performance for "Touch"
Chart (2005)	Peak position
Australia (ARIA)	33
Australian Urban (ARIA)	11
Europe (European Hot 100 Singles)	66
Ireland (IRMA)	8
Netherlands (Dutch Top 40 Tipparade)	9
Netherlands (Single Top 100)	50
Scotland Singles (OCC)	22
Switzerland (Schweizer Hitparade)	43
UK Singles (OCC)	19
UK Hip Hop/R&B (OCC)	2
US Hot R&B/Hip-Hop Songs (Billboard)	95

=== Year-end charts ===
2005 year-end chart performance for "Touch"
Chart (2005)	Position
UK Urban (Music Week)	35

== Release history ==
Region	Date	Format(s)	Label(s)	Ref.
United States	May 31, 2005	Rhythmic contemporary radio	Columbia	
United Kingdom	August 22, 2005	CD	Columbia	
Australia	September 26, 2005	CD	Columbia	
