= Swagger Right =

Single by RichGirl featuring Fabolous and Rick Ross

from the album RichGirl
- Released: September 27, 2010
- Recorded: 2009
- Genre: R&B, hip-hop
- Length: 3:27; 4:31 (Remix)>
- Label: Richcraft/Jive
- Songwriters: Jason Boyd, Vidal Davis, Andre Harris, John Jackson, William Roberts
- Producer: Dre & Vidal

RichGirl singles chronology
"He Ain't wit Me Now (Tho)" (2009)	"Swagger Right" (2010)

Fabolous singles chronology
"All I Do Is Win (Remix)" (2010)	"Swagger Right" (2010)	"Start It Up" (2010)

Rick Ross singles chronology
"Monster" (2010)	"Swagger Right" (2010)	"Aston Martin Music" (2010)

"Swagger Right" is the second single by R&B girl group RichGirl, originally expected to be on their debut album RichGirl, which was shelved following the group's disbandment. The single was written and produced by Dre & Vidal, and features additional writing from the song's featured rappers, Jason Boyd, John Jackson, and William Roberts. The song was released September 27, 2010, on iTunes. "Swagger Right" is credited as the last song officially released by the group before disbanding shortly after.

"Swagger Right" gained mixed reviews from critics, most of whom complimented the group by comparing them to Destiny's Child, but stated that the song comes off a bit weak as a breakthrough single. A music video for the single was shot and directed by Colin Tilley, and was released October 7, 2010. The video gained acclaim for its organic setting and simple scenery.

== Background ==
The song was produced by Dre & Vidal, and features writing from Jason Boyd, Vidal Davis, Andre Harris, John Jackson, William Roberts. The song's original demo was released on a free EP distributed by the girls' official website, and was labeled under its original title track "Get Ya Swagga Right". Following the group's debut single, "He Ain't wit Me Now (Tho)", it was later announced that "Swagger Right" would be the official second single and would be remixed to feature rappers Fabolous and Rick Ross for the song's official release. "Swagger Right" was released on American iTunes Stores September 29, 2010. Replacing Fabolous' verse, Brave of RichGirl additionally created her own verse for the song, which was released through their official Twitter for free download.

=== The Swagger Series ===
To promote the song's release, the girls released webisodes, titled "The Swagger Series", on their official website, and accumulated up to eleven episodes. The webisodes included insight from each member in the group about "swag", tackling different scenarios involving swag, and allow insight into each member of the group and their personal reflection on the past years together. The webisodes were released weekly, later leading into the singles music video release.

"The Swagger Series" webisode begun on July 12, 2010 and featured member Brave giving a lesson on how to “Do You.” The webisodes second episode was hosted by Se7en who would give insight into the fashion of RichGirl and a woman's ability to dress, and featured the first clip of the group's upcoming single "Swagger Right". The third episode of the series featured Lynriette discussing the mans roll, and his "what not to do"'s when approaching a RichGirl. Episodes four and five featured Audra and Brave, respectively, and insight into the girls' workout routine and the clothing that best accompany their figure. The webisodes sixth episode was hosted by Lyndriette's alter-ego, Boomshika. As a spoof on the film 10 Things I Hate About You (1999), Se7en created a list of "10 Ways To Get Your Swagger Right" on the webisodes seventh episode. The series eighth episode was hosted by Brave, who was accompanied by her brother Chris to give the male insight into the idea of "swagger". Episode nine of the series featured an exclusive Q&A with Se7en, and episode ten featured Audra and her cooking skills. "The Swagger Series" ended on its eleventh episode on October 20, 2010, and featured Brave and her talent of spoken word poetry, revealing that she was discovered through that personal talent, as she read her newest work "Time to Become".

== Critical reception ==
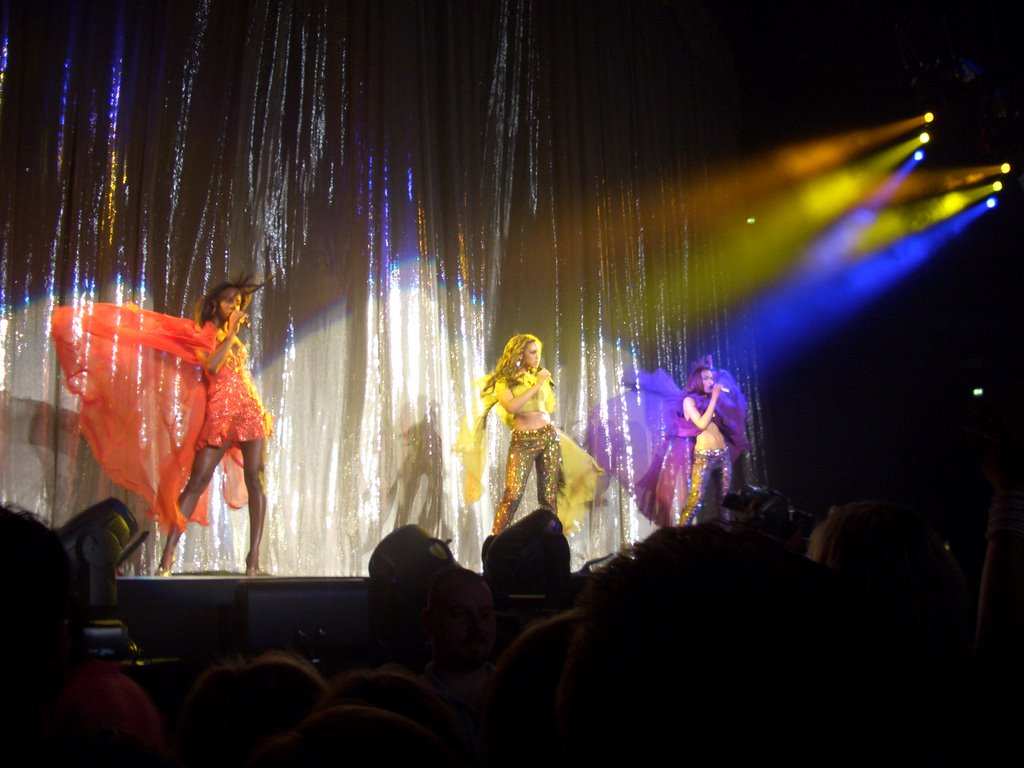
The song garnered multiple comparisons to early work from Destiny's Child.

"Swagger Right" garnered mixed to positive reviews from critics, most of which complimented the song as a refreshing outlook on the group's image as RichGirl. Idolator gave the song a positive review, even comparing it to that of Destiny's Child, stating "The ladies are finally ready to strut their stuff. 'Swagger Right', featuring Fabolous and Rick Ross, is a slinky new joint that may finally help Richgirls measure up to the hype. Who else hears early Destiny’s Child? Yes, we said it. Harrison is known for tracks that blaze with horns and percussion (see Beyonce’s “Crazy In Love”, Amerie’s “1 Thing”), but here he creates an easy-going groove that lets the ladies shine."

MusicRemedy gave the single three-and-a-half stars out of five, adding that the song sounds "straight off the streets," and later described the song as "tight, "dope" and "phat." Sound-Savvy saw promise in the song, stating that the girls each perform great vocally and that the song shows promise for the girls to have girl-groups re-enter the scene. Julianne Escobedo Shepherd of The Fader gave the single a positive review, describing Fabolous' rap as "delicious" and RichGirl's contribution as not over-done due to the sensuality of the song.

== Composition ==
"Swagger Right" has been described as a little bit street and a whole lotta sexy. In comparison to their first single, "He Ain't wit Me Now (Tho)", the song has a more stripped-down sound. The song slithers inside itself, an eerily minimal vacuum of finger snaps and quavering synths. It’s spooky enough that Fabolous is inspired to rap the delicious line "I still turn heads/ poltergeist," and the Richgirls don’t overdo their breathy job, knowing the track’s sensuality is enough.

In a behind-the-scenes look at "Swagger Right", member Audra described the song and its lyrics, stating "'Swagger Right' our single is basically about us talking to a guy. Cause a lot of times guys come and talk to us and be doing all the wrong things." Brave also commented on the song's lyrics, stating "Guys just can't approach like every other day, their needs to be some kind of strategical planning to approach a girl. And most of that strategical planning is to go get their swagger right."

== Music video ==
"This video is much more organic than the first one. You really get to see Brave, you get to see Se7en, you get to see Lyndriette, Audra, who we really are. If you were to take us in a hotel room on a Friday night or at the house and just put a camera in, this is the video you would catch."

— Brave describing the direction of the music video.

A music video for the single was directed by Colin Tilley. In a behind-the-scenes look into the music video, Se7en revealed the music videos art direction team. She revealed that Tanisha Scott and Shana choreographed the dances for the video, Dave Thomas dressed all involved in the videos shooting, hair styling was done by Kim Kimbell and Mayila was in charge of the group's make-up. Following its premiere, the song's video was added to the group's official website with a statement from the group: "It's an instant-classic, making sure the torch has been passed from the classic girl groups of the 90's on to the new classic girl group."

The video premiered October 7, 2010 on BET's 106 & Park. The video begins as the girls snap their fingers to the song's beat, each giving her own introduction. As Fabolous begins his verse, RichGirl and the featured rapper are seen on a spray-painted staircase throughout his verse. As the video continues, the girls continue to perform a choreographed dance throughout different scenes of the grungy factory, including a spotlit scene against a wall and a grungy room with light fans in the background. During Rick Ross' verse, he is shown with RichGirl member Brave and Audra in the middle of a room surrounded by police caution tapes. The video ends with scenes of the entire video pieced together.

On the day of its premiere, Rap-Up described the video as "organic", agreeing with member Brave on her own statement of the video. The Prophet Blog gave the video a positive review, stating "Looking oh so fresh ‘n’ clean, the four ladies of Richgirl deliver the obligatory B-girl posturing and fly poses that come with all R&B videos. There’s poppin’, lockin’, droppin’, struttin’, grindin’ and weave slingin’ galore, which only ever stops long enough for Fabolous and Rick Ross to drop their guest verses before fading into the background and letting the ladies get back to doing what they do best."

== Chart performance ==
The song debuted on the Billboard Hot R&B/Hip-Hop Songs chart at number ninety-one. During its second week, the song peaked at number seventy-two, before falling off the chart entirely.

Chart (2010)	Peak position
Billboard Hot R&B/Hip-Hop Songs	72
