= Young Steff =

American rapper

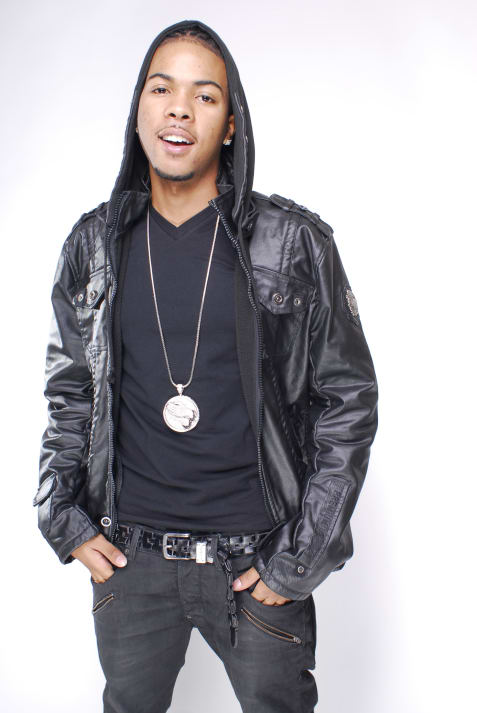
- Goldsborough in 2010

Background information
- Also known as: YS
- Born: Stephen Deon Draie Goldsborough; Vineland, New Jersey, United States
- Genres: R&B, hip hop, pop
- Occupations: Rapper, singer, songwriter
- Years active: 2002–present
- Labels: Richcraft; Atlantic; Roc-A-Fella

Stephen Deon Draie Goldsborough better known by his stage name Young Steff, is an American rapper. Steff was born in Vineland, New Jersey. His father was a member of the gospel group: Spirit, and his aunt, Gina Thompson has worked with producer Rodney Jerkins. Steff signed to Roc-A-Fella Records in 2000. His song "Can I Holla" featuring Bow Wow was featured in the soundtrack to the film Like Mike. His music video, "Professional" (featuring Maino), features a cameo by Candace Owens as one of the homegirls.

== Albums ==
- 2005: Here and Now (shelved)

== Singles ==
- 2004: "R.O.C. Anthem"
- 2008: "Put That on Everything"
- 2008: "Professional" (#113 US R&B)
- 2009: "Slow Jukin'" (#85 US R&B)
- 2010: "I Can Do It Better"
- 2014:
  - "SMQ"
  - "Rap Star" (featured)
- 2015: "Party Pillz" (featured)
- 2022:
  - "Touch"
  - "Don't Tell"
- 2023: "Like yo Xxx"
