= Fall in Love with RichGirl =

Mixtape by RichGirl
- Released: February 14, 2011
- Recorded: 2010
- Genres: Hip hop, soul, R&B
- Length: 39:46
- Labels: Richcraft, Jive

RichGirl chronology
RichGirl EP (2009)	Fall in Love with RichGirl (2011)

Fall in Love with RichGirl is the debut mixtape by R&B girl group RichGirl. The mixtape was released on Valentine's Day, February 14, 2011 by Richcraft and Jive for free download. Along with previously unreleased material, the mixtape includes covers of songs by popular hip hop, R&B and pop music artists.

== Release and promotion ==
The mixtape's name, Fall in Love with RichGirl, pays tribute to its release date Valentine's Day, February 14, 2011. The mixtape was released as a "love letter to their loyal fans," allowing fans to download the mixtape for free. The mixtape contains eleven tracks which include industry remixes with the ladies of RichGirl putting a "pleasant spin" on each track. Notable remixes include Roscoe Dash's "No Hands", Bruno Mars’ "Grenade", Kanye West’s "All of the Lights", and Keri Hilson’s "Pretty Girl Rock". As promotion for the mixtape, RichGirl released their version of "Lay It Down" before its official release, originally performed by Lloyd. The girls each get a chance to individually showcase their vocals and talents on the mixtape by creating solo-cuts on sampled material. The mixtape was released with expectations to "hold fans over" until an official debut album is released.

== Reception ==
The mixtape garnered positive reviews from critics, most of which appreciate the group itself and named the mixtape a pleasant surprise. During the premiere of the mixtape, Rap-Up stated that the girls "show off their pipes," warning that the mixtape will have one falling head over heals in love with the quartet. BET's Sound Off! included the mixtape on a list of the most anticipated mixtapes released on Valentines Day, Fall in Love with RichGirl coming in at number eleven. Stating that their talents are meant to be showcased, Dayalan Kulendran of Soulculture named "Decisions", "Lay It Down" and "RichGirl Rock" as highlights of the mixtape. Yk2daily gave the mixtape a negative review stating that the album should have consisted of newer RichGirl-material than remixes, which seem to dominate the track listing.

== Track listing ==
No.	Title	Music	Sample(s)	Length
1.	"No Hands"	Drumma Boy	"No Hands" by Waka Flocka Flame	4:38
2.	"Smile & Wave" (feat. Chris Brown)	Rich Harrison		3:40
3.	"RichGirl Rock" (by Lyndriette)	Chuck Harmony	"Pretty Girl Rock" by Keri Hilson	2:28
4.	"Circles"	Rich Harrison		4:06
5.	"Lay It Down"	Polow da Don	"Lay It Down" by Lloyd	4:28
6.	"Grenade" (by Audra)	The Smeezingtons	"Grenade" by Bruno Mars	3:41
7.	"Roc"	Stargate		4:22
8.	"All of the Lights" (by Brave)	Kanye West	"All of the Lights" by Kanye West	1:57
9.	"Decisions"	Stargate		4:10
10.	"DJ Got Us" (by Lyndriette)	Max Martin, Shellback	"DJ Got Us Fallin' in Love" by Usher	2:22
11.	"Ready For Love"	The Underdogs		3:54
Total length:				39:46

Notes

- "No Hands" features uncredited vocals only by Roscoe Dash & Waka Flocka Flame due to the song sample.
- "All of the Lights" features uncredited vocals by Kanye West & Rihanna due to the song sample.
- "Roc" was previously recorded by Beyoncé Knowles but never officially released.
- "Decisions" was previously recorded by Brandy and the songs writer Ne-Yo, but never officially released.
