= 24's (RichGirl song) =

Promotional single by RichGirl featuring Bun B

from the album RichGirl
- Released: February 6, 2009
- Recorded: 2007–2008
- Genre: R&B, hip hop
- Length: 4:31; 3:51 (Alternate version)
- Label: Richcraft/Jive
- Songwriter: Rich Harrison

RichGirl singles chronology
24s (2009)	He Ain't wit Me Now (Tho) (2009)

"24's" (pronounced "24 inches") is a song performed by R&B girl group RichGirl featuring United States rapper Bun B. of UGK. The song was produced by Rich Harrison, and was released as a promotional single from their self-titled debut album on February 6, 2009 on iTunes. The song garnered critical acclaim for its low-slung Southern-touch, and gained multiple comparisons to former R&B girl-group Destiny's Child. The song was performed multiple times by the group, and managed to peak at number sixty-eight on Billboards Hot R&B/Hip-Hop Songs.

== Background ==
"24's" was released on American iTunes Store's on February 5, 2009. The song credits featured rapper Bun B from UGK. The song was written and produced by the group's founder, Rich Harrison, who also penned the group's lead single "He Ain't wit Me Now (Tho)". Following the song's release, separate remixes were created by rappers Jim Jones and Lloyd Banks and were expected to be released. In an interview with Billboard, Brave revealed that her rapping alter-ego, Kiki Bravery, created an additional remix, which is also currently awaiting release.

== Critical reception & composition ==
"24's" garnered positive reviews from critics, most of whom acclaimed the song's thumping beat, and true R&B grit. Andy Kellman of AllMusic compared the song to Harrison's previously produced "Soldier" (2004) by Destiny's Child, with an added touch of elegance by the group's harmonization. Noting an influence from David Banner and Lil Flip's "Like a Pimp," Felipe Delerme of FADER favored the " multi-culti foursome" for their ability to revive "Glam&B". Jermy Leeuwis of MusicRemedy awarded the song five out of five stars, praising the song as a classic and noted the group's ability to stand out from other groups previously formed, as "each of them individually is just talented as the girl to their right and left." NewMusicReviews complimented Bun B's addition to the song as fantastic, and continued to compliment the girl's performance in the song as similar to Beyoncé. Burmy of DJBooth described the group as a "Voltron of sorts," praising the group's ability to change the game with their style, sass, and swagger "24's".

"24's" has been described as a low-slung Southern-touched single with an elegant spin on a Destiny's Child-inspired track. Harrison creates a throwback production for the track. Lyrically, RichGirl aim to please their man. The song's title references the twenty-four inches that a man's car hovers from the ground, which would involve the act of sex.

== Live performances ==
The song was first performed live at the Kiss FM Concert, where the girls wore simple, casual clothing. The girls later performed at the BK FamFest Atlanta and have more recently performed at the WNBA All Star Game. The song was also performed at Beyoncé Knowles's I Am... World Tour as an opening act.

== Chart performance ==
"24's" debuted on Billboard's Hot R&B/Hip-Hop Songs at number ninety-two. After a couple weeks stalling on the charts, the song climbed up the charts at number eighty-three. The song later peaked on its third week on the U.S. R&B/Hip-Hop at number 68.

Chart (2009)	Peak position
Billboard Hot R&B/Hip-Hop Songs	68
