= Stanley Walden =

American composer, performer, and professor

- Born: December 2, 1932 (age 93)

Stanley Walden (born December 2, 1932) is an American composer, musical performer, and professor of musical theater. He has written music for the theater (musicals, operas, ballets) in America and Europe, as well as for the concert stage (Philadelphia, Chicago, Cleveland and Louisville Orchestras; and chamber music for Carole Cowan, Jan DeGaetani, Reri Grist, Gilbert Kalish, Joel Krosnick, Robert Levin and many others). He has also been a clarinetist, actor and director. He is perhaps best known for writing music and lyrics of the revue Oh! Calcutta! He has also written a number of song cycles.

== Clarinetist ==
Walden attended James Madison High School and studied modern dance with Merce Cunningham. He then attended New York University and Queens College, studying clarinet with David Weber and composition with Ben Weber. From 1953 to 1955 – and after serving in the U.S. Army as principal clarinetist of the 7th Army Symphony Orchestra in Stuttgart (1955–57) – he worked as musical assistant to choreographers such as Martha Graham, José Limón, Jerome Robbins and Daniel Nagrin until 1960.

From 1957 to 1970, Walden lived in New York, performing as a clarinetist. He has played with the New York Philharmonic Orchestra, the Metropolitan Opera Orchestra and as bass clarinetist with the New York Woodwind Quintet, among others, and was a founding member of the Contemporary Chamber Ensemble, the Gramercy Chamber Ensemble, the Penn Contemporary Players and performed with the Group for Contemporary Music.

== Composer and educator ==
In 1967, he founded, along with Peter Schickele and Robert Dennis, the composition and performing trio The Open Window. In 1969, they composed the music and lyrics to the revue Oh! Calcutta!, which went on to become the longest running revue in Broadway history. The Open Window received a Grammy Award nomination for best score from an original cast album.

In 1970, Walden joined The Open Theater and composed the music for The Serpent and The Mutation Show. He then went on to join The Winter Project with Joseph Chaikin.

In 1970, he met the Hungarian writer and theater director George Tabori. They collaborated on more than 50 theater productions, including Pinkville (New York 1970, Berlin 1971), Sigmunds Freude (Bremen 1975), The Sinking of the Titanic, My Mother's Courage, Improvisations on Shylock (Munich 1980-81), Jubiläum (in which Walden acted a major role) and Peepshow (Bochum 1983-84).

Walden then went to the Vienna Burgtheater with Tabori and Claus Peymann, where Mein Kampf, Ballade der Wienerschnitzel, Requiem for a Spy, and The Goldberg Variations (1991) were produced. In Tabori's own theater, Der Kreis (The Circle), they collaborated on Masada, Lear's Shadow and For the Second Time, in which Walden starred with Hanna Schygulla. At the Berliner Ensemble, they produced The Brecht Files (1999) and The Earthquake Concerto (2002).

In addition, Walden has also composed his own stage works, such as a jazz opera of Gertrude Stein's Doctor Faustus Lights the Lights (UA Cologne 1983, New York), the opera Liebster Vater (UA Bremen 1987, also produced in Berlin, Leipzig, Weimar and in New York in 2002) and Bach's Letzte Oper, a work commissioned by Der Danske Oper, with libretto by Jess Ornsbro (UA Erfurt 2002).

He has composed numerous chamber works, both instrumental and vocal, and the orchestral works Circus (1969) for the Louisville Orchestra under Jorge Mester, later performed by the Chicago Symphony Orchestra (Seiji Ozawa) and the Cleveland Orchestra (Louis Lane); Invisible Cities, commissioned by the Philadelphia Orchestra under Erich Leinsdorf (1986); and Weewis, Margo Sappington's ballet commission by the Joffrey Ballet (1973) and later performed by companies in Europe and Mexico.

Walden also composed the chamber symphony, After Auschwitz, which was performed at the Eastman School of Music at the University of Rochester (New York). It was also performed by the Budapest Strings Chamber Orchestra in Cividale del Friuli, Italy and by the Brandenburg Philharmonic in Potsdam, Germany.

His musicals include The Kid (American Place Theater, NY, 1972), Back Country (with Jacques Levy, 1979), Brecht's The Caucasian Chalk Circle (Arena Theater in Washington, DC, 1978), Bahn Frei! (1989), Miami Lights (with Jacques Levy, 1990), Café Mitte (with Volker Ludwig, 1997), Claire (with Manfred Karge (Bochum, 1985, also Ghent and NDR TV), Die Bettler Oper (Renaissance Theater, Berlin, 1985), The Goldberg Variations Musical (Tabori in Karlsruh, 2016) and Butterfly Madam (with B. Peachy, Palm Springs, 2011)

Walden's film scores include David Newman's La fille d’Amérique (1977), Vadim Glowna's Desperado City (1981), which won the Caméra d’Or in Cannes and in which Walden also acted, and George Tabori’s Frohes Fest for German public service television broadcaster ZDF.

During his extensive career, he has received acclaim as a conductor, author, actor (on stage and in film), director and educator. In 1991, he and his wife, Barbara Walden, founded the Musical/Show Department at the Berlin Universität der Künste (Berlin University of the Arts). In 1998, collaborating with Barbara Walden, he published the book Life Upon The Wicked Stage, which has become a standard work for training musical actors. In 2000, after resigning from his professorship at the Berlin University of the Arts, he continued to give workshops there in 2001. The Waldens also taught workshops at the Folkwang Schule in Essen, at the Theater Institute in Munich, in Moscow, at Sarah Lawrence College and at the California Institute of the Arts.

He served on the faculty of The Juilliard School at Lincoln Center ("Music for Dance") from 1960 to 1964 and the Lincoln Center Institute (now the Lincoln Center Institute for the Arts in Education). He was a guest teacher at Yale University and the Eastman School of Music.

== Personal life ==
The parents of two sons, Matthew and Joshua, the Waldens lived in New York and Berlin before moving to Palm Springs, California, in 2007. Barbara Walden died in 2012. Joshua died in 2016.

In 2014, Walden made the autobiographical film CHUTZPAH! with Tom Gass.

In 2018, he published an autobiography: Telling Time: Reflections on a Life in Music. The book is dedicated to his second wife, Rhonda Rockwell, whom he met in 2014. They reside in Palm Springs.

== Stanley Walden at 90: a celebration ==
In 2022, Walden's career was celebrated across two continents in honor of his 90th birthday. Tributes took place in the United States and Germany: Barge Music in New York City (September), Baltimore Lieder Weekend (October) and Leipzig (November).

== Recordings ==
Clarinetist:

- MOZART SERENADES (Everest Records, LPBR 6042)
- EDGAR VARÈSE (Nonesuch H-71269)
- KURT WEILL, DARIUS MILHAUD (Nonesuch H 71281)

Composer/performer:

- THREE VIEWS FROM THE OPEN WINDOW (LS 691)
- THE OPEN WINDOW (Vanguard VSD 1565)
- OH! CALCUTTA! (AIDART 9903) (POLYDOR 2371 103) (RCACAMS-162)

Composer:

- STANLEY WALDEN Naxos (American Classics 8.559355)
- JAN DeGAETANI/GILBERT KALISH (BRIDGE 9340)
- EASTMAN AMERICAN MUSIC SERIES, VOL 5 (ALBANY TROY 261)
- CAFÉ MITTE (SONY MUSIC, COLUMBIA 491716 2)
- GRIPS THEATER (ARGON LC 67137)
- DIE BETTLEROPER (RENAISSANCE THEATER BERLIN B-1656)
