= Oh! Calcutta! =

Avant-garde, risque theatrical revue (1969)

- Oh! Calcutta! original cast album cover
- Music: Peter Schickele; Robert Dennis; Stanley Walden
- Lyrics: Peter Schickele; Robert Dennis; Stanley Walden
- Book: Various Artists
- Productions: 1969 Off-Broadway; 1970 West End; 1976 Broadway revival 1977 Madrid

Oh! Calcutta! is an avant-garde, risqué theatrical revue created by British drama critic Kenneth Tynan and produced by Hillard Elkins. The show, consisting of sketches on sex-related topics, debuted Off-Broadway in 1969 and then in the West End in 1970. It ran in London for over 3,900 performances, and in New York initially for 1,314. Revivals enjoyed even longer runs, including a 1976 Broadway revival that ran for 5,959 performances, making the show the longest-running revue in Broadway history, the second longest-running revival (after Chicago), and the eighth longest-running Broadway show ever.

The show sparked considerable controversy at the time due to its extended scenes of total nudity, both male and female.

The title is taken from a painting by French artist Clovis Trouille, a portrait of a reclining nude. Trouille's 1946 work Oh! Calcutta! Calcutta! mixes photographic collage and oil techniques; the inscription is a French pun (quel cul t'as!), an admiring exclamation on the woman's buttocks.

== Background ==
Tynan came up with the idea of putting on an erotic revue in the early summer of 1966. Tynan had hoped that Harold Pinter would direct the production to give it avant-garde legitimacy, but Pinter declined. Sketches were written by, among others, Samuel Beckett, John Lennon, Sam Shepard, Leonard Melfi, Edna O'Brien, Sherman Yellen, Jules Feiffer and Tynan, and often featured the cast nude. Peter Schickele, also known as the creator of PDQ Bach, Robert Dennis and Stanley Walden were the revue's composers, known as The Open Window. Beckett's contribution, Breath, was used as a Prologue in the original New York staging, but Beckett eventually withdrew permission for its use. Tynan commissioned British Pop artist Pauline Boty to make a series of paintings of erogenous zones on which the revue would be based. Boty died of cancer in July 1966 so only managed to complete one painting, her last: BUM.

== Productions ==
The musical opened off-Broadway at the Eden Theatre on June 21, 1969, transferred to the Belasco Theatre on February 17, 1971, and closed on August 12, 1972, after a total of 1,314 performances. It was directed by Jacques Levy and choreographed by Margo Sappington. The cast included Sappington, future television stars Bill Macy and Alan Rachins, as well as Raina Barrett, Mark Dempsey, Katie Drew-Wilkinson, Boni Enten, Leon Russom, Nancy Tribush, and George Welbes, and the three "Open Window" composers, who functioned as the band.

The musical premiered in London on July 27, 1970, at The Roundhouse, and transferred to the West End's Royalty Theatre on September 30, 1970, running until January 27, 1974. The show then transferred to the Duchess Theatre on January 28, 1974, where it ran until February 1980, for a total of 3,918 performances. The London show was produced by Michael White.

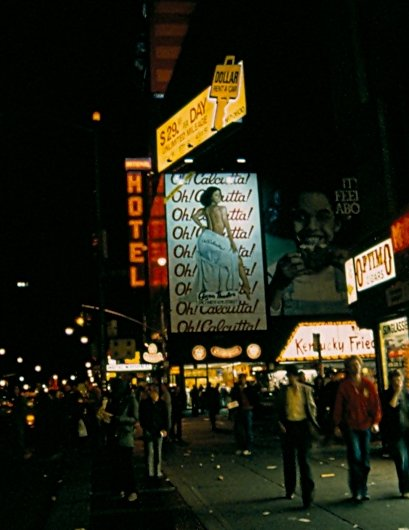
Billboard on Broadway in 1981

A revival opened on Broadway at the Edison Theatre on September 24, 1976, and closed on August 6, 1989 after 5,959 performances, again directed and choreographed by Levy and Sappington. The revival briefly became the longest-running show in Broadway history. It remains Broadway's eighth longest-running show and the longest-running revue in Broadway history.

The Spanish-language premiere production opened on October 9, 1977 at Teatro Príncipe in Madrid, Spain, directed by Juan José Alonso Millán, who also translated the show.

=== Filmed recording ===
A pay-per-view video production played on closed-circuit television in select cities in 1971, and was released theatrically in 1972. In both cases, many cities and municipalities banned its screening. Frank Herold, an editor who worked on the film, commented on that in a brief post he contributed to the relevant Internet Movie Database page.

== Synopsis ==
The revue takes place in the form of sketches. Lyrics and music are by Robert Dennis, Peter Schickele, and Stanley Walden unless otherwise noted.

A number of sketches were cut before the show opened, by writers including Julian Barry, Maria Irene Fornes, Bruce Jay Friedman, Pat McCormick, David Mercer, Edna O'Brien, Levy, and Tynan.

=== Act 1 ===
Prologue

Samuel Beckett's "Breath" (until licence withdrawn by author)

Taking Off the Robe

The actors dance and remove their robes to the opening song ("Taking Off the Robe" (Oh! Calcutta!)).

Jack & Jill

A boy and a girl who just met are in their own playland, with the boy constantly trying to find ways to seduce the girl, who is afraid of him because he is a boy. The sketch ends with the girl in a coma after the boy rapes her. Written by Leonard Melfi.

Suite for Five Letters

A song of five letters written by anonymous authors about their sexual preferences. These were actual letters to the editor from various newspapers from olden times in London, as well as contemporary letters from sexual newspapers of the day. The actors then improvise recounting their own sexual fantasies. Written by David Mercer or Edna O'Brien.

Dick and Jane

An uptight girl gets a lesson in loosening up after her lover is sick of her constantly stiff ways. Written by Jules Feiffer. In 2019, Feiffer noted that "I felt shame for what had been done to my sketch" but "it inspired me to extend the sort of thinking that went into my sketch. The result was the play Carnal Knowledge that Mike Nichols had me adapt as a film."

Will Answer All Serious Replies

A young couple starts to rethink getting into the swingers lifestyle after meeting the middle-aged couple who answers their ad. Written by Robert Benton & David Newman.

Delicious Indignities

A chaste woman is caught by her admirer, who then proceeds to learn that she is not as chaste as he thinks she is. It was written by Sherman Yellen. Yellen said in 2019, "I would never write that sketch today. I would never think that a subject which dealt with rape, even peripherally, was a funny one."

Was It Good for You, Too?

A man participates in a sex study and the whole experience ends up turning into one big farce. The scene plays like the Marx Brothers at a sex research facility. Written by Dan Greenburg.

=== Act 2 ===
Who: Whom

A louche gentleman discusses his preferences in women, all of whom are seen in various aspects of bondage. Written by Kenneth Tynan or John Lennon.

Life Is Over Much Too Soon

A pre-recorded section, where the actors are nude outside doing interpretive dance ("Much Too Soon"). Music and lyrics by Jacques Levy, Dennis, Schickele and Walden.

One on One

Another nude interpretive dance.

Rock Garden

After a man rambles on about painting the fence and building a rock garden, his son talks about what girls really like. Written by Sam Shepard.

Four in Hand

A newcomer to a masturbation game cannot seem to think of anything to masturbate to. This sketch's first draft was written by John Lennon.

Finale

Players come out to sing the finale, also doing voiceover as to what the theater patrons are really thinking about the experience. Examples include: "She has pretty eyes," with the joke being that all of the actors are nude at this point. Other lines include "How come none of the guys have hard-ons?" "That's my boyfriend—that IS a hard-on" and "If they showed this in Washington, Agnew would shit!" ("Coming Together, Going Together").

== Critical response ==
Clive Barnes, in his 1969 review for The New York Times, wrote that "the humor is so doggedly sophomoric and soporific", adding: "The failure here is almost exclusively a failure of the writers and the producers. The director, Jacques Levy, has done his best with the weak material at hand ... the nude scenes, while derivative, are attractive enough. The best effects—including the rather sweet grope-in immediately after the intermission—have been taken from Robert Joffrey's ballet 'Astarte', and the show uses the same projected media designers ... In sum, Oh! Calcutta! is likely to disappoint different people in different ways, but disappointment is the order of the night."

Irving Wardle, writing in The Times in 1970, said: "I have seen better revues than Oh! Calcutta! but none based on ideas that strike me as more sympathetic. Namely that the ordinary human body is an object well worth attention: and that there is no reason why the public treatment of sex should not be extended to take in not only lyricism and personal emotion but also the rich harvest of bawdy jokes." He noted that the enjoyment and lack of embarrassment of the cast helped the audience to accept the more insubstantial elements of the revue's material and that the stage sets' screen projections assisted the dance numbers considerably, concluding: "In many ways, it is a ghastly show: ill-written, juvenile, and attention-seeking. But it is not a menace."

In an oral history published in The New York Times in 2019, composer-performer Stanley Walden recounted that "At Sardi’s, we were waiting for the reviews, for The New York Times. It was a pan. The investors, you could see their faces sagging. (Producer) Hilly Elkins jumped up on a chair and said, 'Anybody who wants to get their money back, I will buy out their investment here and now.'"

=== Obscenity allegations ===
In 1969, during its off-Broadway previews, members of various New York City departments were invited to view the show to avoid it being shut down, as had been the case earlier in the year with Lennox Raphael's stage version of Che!.

The 1970 production at The Roundhouse, London, attracted the attention of the Metropolitan Police's Obscene Publications Squad, which sent two officers to a preview of the show. One of the officers returned twice more, before recommending a prosecution under the Theatres Act 1968 for obscenity. The Director of Public Prosecutions sent its panel of experts, including two retired headmistresses, to see The Roundhouse production. Their judgment that it was not obscene enabled it to transfer to London's West End.

A 1977 performance in Cincinnati, Ohio was shut down by Hamilton County Prosecutor Simon Leis Jr. before a ruling by a federal judge the next day allowed the show to resume performances.

=== Arrests ===
A 1970 showing of a filmed version of the New York production show at the Orson Welles Cinema in Cambridge, Massachusetts led to the arrest of nine theater officials by the Cambridge Police Department and the Middlesex County District Attorney's office on counts of "immoral and obscene entertainment."

In 1977, nine members of the cast were arrested by police officers after performances in Lexington, Kentucky. William Gordon Kenton, then Speaker of the Kentucky House, represented the actors in court.
