= 2005 in American television =

In American television in 2005, notable events included television series debuts, finales, cancellations, and new channel initiations.

== Events ==
=== January ===
Date	Event
1	The American channel package PT East, originally created by the New York, New York, company PrimeTime 24, and used by satellite TV viewers where over-the-air TV is unavailable, changes its ABC affiliate from WKRN-TV (Nashville, Tennessee) to flagship station WABC-TV (New York City).
1	DirecTV removed Trio from its EPG lineup. The network loses two-thirds of its 20 million viewers, putting in doubt the future of the NBCUniversal-owned channel.
3	Craig Ferguson replaces Craig Kilborn as the host of The Late Late Show on CBS, becoming the first foreign-born host to have his own late-night talk show.
5	The 35th anniversary episode of the series All My Children is broadcast by ABC. The special episode, which used former characters Mark Dalton (Mark LaMura) and Nick Davis (Larry Keith), was also unique in that it was the last appearance of ailing actress Ruth Warrick. She died less than two weeks after the episode was broadcast.
7	Tamala Edwards resigns as co-anchor of ABC's World News Now and heads to the network's O&O WPVI/Philadelphia.
17	After over 6 years, Big Tigger hosts Rap City: Tha Bassment for the last time on BET. He reveals that his mother has sold the basement and forced him out to live with his father. The following day, the show is retitled as Rap City with Mad Linx taking over as the new host.
17	Heather Cabot becomes the new co-anchor of ABC's World News Now.
22	FoxBox, Fox's Saturday morning programming block owned by 4Kids Entertainment, is rebranded as 4Kids TV.
29	Nickelodeon's successful Saturday night block, SNICK, is discontinued after 12 years. It would then be revamped as a Saturday night edition of TEENick for the 2004–05 television season and onward until the TEENick name was dropped in February 2009 and shifted into a 24-hour channel (rebranding The N) months later.

=== February ===
Date	Event
6	Super Bowl XXXIX is telecast by Fox. Following the game, Fox airs The Simpsons episode "Homer and Ned's Hail Mary Pass", followed by the pilot of American Dad!.
9	Jeopardy! held its Ultimate Tournament of Champions and concluded on May 25; Brad Rutter emerged as the champion of the tournament and won the grand prize of $2,000,000; with his career winnings of $3,270,102 (which include another $15,000 for winning a match), Rutter surpassed Ken Jennings's $3,022,700 as the new largest winner in the show's program, as well as the all-time biggest game show winner in the history of American and international television, a title which Rutter held on until October 10, 2008, where Jennings regained the status (Rutter would later top Jennings' record on May 16, 2014, after winning another Jeopardy! tournament, Battle of the Decades; Rutter would later lose the record to Jennings on January 14, 2020, after losing to another Jeopardy! tournament, The Greatest of All Time).

=== March ===
Date	Event
9	On the 24th anniversary of his debut, Dan Rather retires as main anchorman of the CBS Evening News and is succeeded by Face the Nation anchor Bob Schieffer on an interim basis.
24	The pilot episode for the American adaptation of British sitcom, The Office airs on NBC.
26	After a 16-year hiatus, Doctor Who returns to BBC television in the UK. Around this time efforts are under way to get the cult program a berth on an American network, however Sci-Fi Channel rejects it for the entire first two seasons on its revival run. The following Doctor Who episodes were returned to the air on BBC America in December 2009.

=== April ===
Date	Event
1	ABC news anchorman Peter Jennings anchors what will turn out to be his final World News Tonight telecast. Four days later, Jennings informs viewers of World News Tonight, via a taped segment, that he has been diagnosed with lung cancer and beginning of chemotherapy. He dies four months later at the age of 67.

=== May ===
Date	Event
1	Family Guy begins airing new episodes on Fox with "North by North Quahog". Initially cancelled by Fox in 2002, the unexpected popularity of the show's reruns on Cartoon Network's Adult Swim block and DVD releases, as well as letters addressed to Fox, forces the network to renew the show. Fox's revival of Family Guy coincides with the launch of the network's Animation Domination block, which also debuts on this night and pairs Family Guy with King of the Hill, The Simpsons, and the official series premiere of American Dad!.
2	Hunter Tylo resumes her role as Dr. Taylor Forrester on the CBS soap opera The Bold and the Beautiful, after the character was "killed off" three years ago. The revelation that she was alive surprises many viewers as it had not been hinted by any other sources, print or online.
16	Everybody Loves Raymond broadcasts its last episode on CBS, The Finale.
23	Tom Cruise appears on The Oprah Winfrey Show, which made several public pronouncements of his relationship with Katie Holmes, and most notably "the couch incident."
24	CBS aired a special, Rob and Amber Get Married, featuring the marriage of Survivor and The Amazing Race contestants Amber Brkich and Rob Mariano, in The Bahamas. They were earlier engaged on May 9 last year on the live finale of Survivor: All-Stars, in which Brkich won the season.
24	On CBS, Sasha Alexander makes her final regular appearance as Special Agent Kate Todd on NCIS. Alexander's character on the series, is later replaced by Mossad Officer Ziva David (played by Cote de Pablo).
25	On Fox, Carrie Underwood wins season four of the popular singing competition, American Idol.

=== June ===
Date	Event
30	Viacom launches Logo TV, a TV channel intended for lesbian, gay, bisexual, and transgender adults. The channel space of defunct sister network VH1 Mega Hits provides the bulk of the new channel's carriage.

=== July ===
Date	Event
1	The PAX network is renamed as i: Independent Television.
28	After 5 years, AJ and Free retire as hosts of BET's 106 & Park and are succeeded by Big Tigger (co-host of BET Style) and Julissa (host of The Center) on an interim basis.

=== August ===
Date	Event
1	Current TV, a 24-hour youth-oriented news channel owned by the former U.S. vice president Al Gore, is initiated. The channel replaces Newsworld International.
7	ABC's acclaimed news anchor Peter Jennings dies of lung cancer. He is succeeded by Bob Woodruff and Elizabeth Vargas for World News Tonight in December.
7	Oregon-based model Sara Jean Underwood makes her national television debut on the premiere night of The Girls Next Door.
13	In response to Linda Vester's year-long maternity leave, Fox News Channel announces that she will not be hosting DaySide again.
29	Hurricane Katrina strikes the Greater New Orleans area, causing major disruption of the region's television broadcasts. Local television news programs relocate to other cities to cover the story, though most are interrupted by the storm; some continue to broadcast reports by the Internet.

=== September ===
Date	Event
2	While presenting for the NBC telecast of A Concert for Hurricane Relief, music producer and rapper Kanye West ignores his script and addresses what he perceives as the racism of both the government and of the media, stating: George Bush doesn't care about black people, and calls for the media to stop labeling African-American families as "looters" while white families were depicted as "looking for food."
5	In Champaign, Illinois, NBC affiliates WICS/WICD end their 46-year relationship with the network and swap affiliations with ABC affiliate WAND due to an affiliation deal between LIN Media, operators of WAND, and NBC.
18	The 57th Annual Primetime Emmy Awards are given at the Shrine Auditorium in a ceremony broadcast by CBS.
19	Mike Jerrick and Juliet Huddy take over as new hosts of DaySide on Fox News Channel.
20	Maggie Ausburn is the winner of the American version of Big Brother 6 on CBS, and wins the $500,000 prize. Runner-Up Ivette Corredero wins $50,000.
20	The pilot episode for My Name Is Earl is broadcast on NBC.
26	Sprout (now Universal Kids) is launched by a joint venture between PBS, Comcast, HIT Entertainment, and Sesame Workshop. The new network replaces PBS Kids, allowing for an initial reach of 16.5 million subscribers.

=== October ===
Date	Event
1	NBC's Saturday Night Live begins broadcasting in HDTV format.
3	Rap City host Mad Linx temporarily leaves the show to host BET's The Road Show. For the next several months his place is taken by J-Nicks, until Mad Linx returns the following February.
5	The Outdoor Life Network broadcast its first NHL game. The network eventually rebranded into Versus the following year and then to NBCSN in 2012.
22	Tina Fey returns from maternity leave to resume her duties for Saturday Night Live's Weekend Update skit.
26	Game 4 of the World Series airs on Fox. The Chicago White Sox sweep the Houston Astros, winning the title for the first time since 1917. This marked the end of the Curse of the Black Sox, a term given to the scandals that affected the team after the 1919 series.

=== November ===
Date	Event
13	Professional wrestler Eddie Guerrero dies at the age of 38 after being found unconscious in his hotel room.
22	Ted Koppel resigns as host of ABC's Nightline after 25 years. Six days later, Koppel is succeeded by a three-anchor team of Martin Bashir, Cynthia McFadden, and Terry Moran.

=== December ===
Date	Event
1	Oprah Winfrey appears on CBS's Late Show with David Letterman, making her first appearance on a David Letterman-hosted show in sixteen years.
2	A Knots Landing retrospective, Knots Landing Reunion: Together Again, is broadcast (appropriately) by CBS.
2	ABC World News Now anchor Heather Cabot leaves the program due to her pregnancy.
5	Bob Woodruff and Elizabeth Vargas unofficially begin anchoring duties for ABC News's World News Tonight, replacing Peter Jennings, who died of cancer almost four months ago.
6	The 2005 Victoria's Secret Fashion Show is broadcast on CBS. 8.9 million people tune in.
24	TBN's kid-aimed, faith-based channel Smile of a Child launches.
26	ABC broadcasts its 555th and final telecast of Monday Night Football, a game between the New England Patriots and New York Jets.
31	The original Viacom officially divides into two companies, with the CBS television network and pay-TV division Showtime Networks becoming part of CBS Corporation, and the MTV Networks group of channels (which includes MTV, Nickelodeon, Comedy Central) and BET (Black Entertainment Television) becoming part of the new Viacom. Eventually, the greatest casualty of the division was that Paramount Television, which became part of CBS Corporation, would cease to exist after 38 years of television production, as it was rebranded as CBS Paramount Television in January 2006, using that name until it became CBS Television Studios three years later.

== Television shows ==
=== Shows debuting in 2005 ===
Date	Show	Network
January 3	Who's Your Daddy?	Fox
January 3	The Late Late Show with Craig Ferguson	CBS
January 3	Medium	NBC
January 4	Committed	NBC
January 5	The Road to Stardom with Missy Elliott	UPN
January 5	Sports Illustrated Swimsuit Model Search	NBC
January 8	The Will	CBS
January 9	Strange Love	VH1
January 9	Zoey 101	Nickelodeon
January 11	Queer Eye for the Straight Girl	Bravo
January 13	Tilt	ESPN
January 14	Jonny Zero	Fox
January 17	Supernanny	ABC
January 17	Auto-B-Good	Syndication
January 19	Antiques Roadshow FYI	PBS
January 19	Point Pleasant	Fox
January 21	American Dragon: Jake Long	Disney Channel
January 22	D.I.C.E.	Cartoon Network
January 23	Numbers	CBS
January 23	Pet Alien	Cartoon Network
January 23	Young Blades	PAX TV
January 24	Digging for the Truth	History
February 2	It Takes a Thief	Discovery Channel
February 5	Power Rangers S.P.D.	ABC Family (Jetix)
February 6	American Dad!	Fox
February 8	Most Outrageous Moments	NBC
February 14	Kudlow & Company	CNBC
February 14	Cuts	UPN
February 20	Robot Chicken	Adult Swim
February 21	Avatar: The Last Airbender	Nickelodeon
February 23	Unique Whips	Speed
March 3	Law & Order: Trial By Jury	NBC
March 3	The Contender	NBC
March 6	Damage Control	MTV
March 6	Iron Chef America	Food Network
March 6	The Starlet	The WB
March 7	Fat Actress	Showtime
March 8	Blind Justice	ABC
March 8	Lie Detector	PAX TV
March 11	Wonder Showzen	MTV2
March 13	Jake in Progress	ABC
March 14	Mad Money	CNBC
March 18	The Suite Life of Zack & Cody	Disney Channel
March 24	The Office	NBC
March 24	Life on a Stick	Fox
March 25	Kojak	USA Network
March 25	Krypto the Superdog	Cartoon Network
March 27	Grey's Anatomy	ABC
March 28	Attack of the Show!	G4
March 30	Eyes	ABC
April 3	The Eyes of Nye	PBS
April 4	Lost Worlds	History
April 4	Next	MTV
April 5	Pinky Dinky Doo	Noggin
April 6	Con	Comedy Central
April 6	Meet the Barkers	MTV
April 8	Living with Fran	The WB
April 12	Deadliest Catch	Discovery Channel
April 13	Revelations	NBC
April 13	Stacked	Fox
April 24	Strip Search	VH1
April 30	Showdog Moms & Dads	Bravo
May 3	The Search for the Funniest Mom in America	Nick at Nite
May 9	Xtreme Fakeovers	PAX TV
May 14	Game Show Moments Gone Bananas	VH1
May 17	Britney and Kevin: Chaotic	UPN
May 24	The Bad Girl's Guide	UPN
May 26	Kept	VH1
May 30	Hell's Kitchen	Fox
May 30	The Life and Times of Juniper Lee	Cartoon Network
June 1	Dancing with the Stars	ABC
June 1	Hit Me, Baby, One More Time	NBC
June 1	Sports Kids Moms & Dads	Bravo
June 2	Beauty and the Geek	The WB
June 5	Food Network Star	Food Network
June 6	Fire Me...Please	CBS
June 7	The Scholar	ABC
June 8	The Inside	Fox
June 9	The Cut	CBS
June 13	Tucker	MSNBC
June 17	The Buzz on Maggie	Disney Channel
June 19	12 oz. Mouse	Adult Swim
June 20	Wildfire	ABC Family
June 21	I Want To Be a Hilton	NBC
June 26	The Andy Milonakis Show	MTV
June 29	Stella	Comedy Central
June 30	Being Bobby Brown	Bravo
July 6	Mind of Mencia	Comedy Central
July 8	Camp Lazlo	Cartoon Network
July 8	Stankervision	MTV2
July 9	Catscratch	Nickelodeon
July 9	Time Warp Trio	Discovery Kids
July 10	Hogan Knows Best	VH1
July 10	The Princes of Malibu	Fox
July 11	Rock Star	CBS
July 15	Ooh, Aah & You	Playhouse Disney
July 20	Criss Angel Mindfreak	A&E
July 20	So You Think You Can Dance	Fox
July 27	R U the Girl	UPN
July 28	The Law Firm	NBC
August 2	Hi-Jinks	Nick at Nite
August 3	Kathy Griffin: My Life on the D-List	Bravo
August 4	It's Always Sunny in Philadelphia	FX
August 7	American Princess	WE tv
August 7	Carl²	Cartoon Network
August 7	The Girls Next Door	E!
August 7	Man, Moment, Machine	History
August 8	Beautiful People	ABC Family
August 8	The Situation Room with Wolf Blitzer	CNN
August 8	Weeds	Showtime
August 14	Barbershop	Showtime
August 14	Delilah and Julius	Cartoon Network
August 14	My Kind of Town	ABC
August 16	Tommy Lee Goes to College	NBC
August 22	Tickle-U	Cartoon Network
August 22	Yoko! Jakamoko! Toto!	Cartoon Network
August 22	Harry and His Bucket Full of Dinosaurs	Cartoon Network
August 22	Peppa Pig	Cartoon Network
August 22	Firehouse Tales	Cartoon Network
August 22	Gerald McBoing-Boing	Cartoon Network
August 22	Little Robots	Cartoon Network
August 22	Gordon the Garden Gnome	Cartoon Network
August 27	A.T.O.M.	Jetix
August 28	Palmetto Pointe	PAX TV
August 29	Prison Break	Fox
September 3	Danger Rangers	Syndicated through PBS Kids
September 4	The Zula Patrol	Syndicated through PBS Kids
September 6	Go, Diego, Go!	Nick Jr.
September 8	Reunion	Fox
September 10	Bratz	4Kids TV
September 10	G.I. Joe: Sigma 6	4Kids TV
September 11	Breaking Bonaduce	VH1
September 11	My Fair Brady	VH1
September 11	The War at Home	Fox
September 12	Judge Alex	Syndication
September 12	Jack's Big Music Show	Noggin
September 12	Meerkat Manor	Animal Planet
September 12	The Tyra Banks Show	Syndication
September 12	The Martha Stewart Show	Syndication
September 13	Bones	Fox
September 13	Supernatural	The WB
September 13	Engineering an Empire	History
September 14	Head Cases	Fox
September 16	Twins	The WB
September 16	Threshold	CBS
September 17	Coconut Fred's Fruit Salad Island	Kids' WB
September 17	Loonatics Unleashed	Kids' WB
September 17	Johnny Test	Kids' WB
September 17	The Showbiz Show with David Spade	Comedy Central
September 18	Life with Derek	Disney Channel
September 19	How I Met Your Mother	CBS
September 19	Out of Practice	CBS
September 19	Just Legal	The WB
September 19	Surface	NBC
September 19	Kitchen Confidential	Fox
September 20	My Name Is Earl	NBC
September 21	E-Ring	NBC
September 21	The Apprentice: Martha Stewart	NBC
September 21	Invasion	ABC
September 22	Everybody Hates Chris	UPN
September 22	Love, Inc.	UPN
September 22	Criminal Minds	CBS
September 23	Ghost Whisperer	CBS
September 23	Inconceivable	NBC
September 23	Killer Instinct	Fox
September 23	Three Wishes	NBC
September 24	Get Ed	Jetix
September 24	America's Heartland	Syndication
September 27	Commander in Chief	ABC
September 27	Sex, Love & Secrets	UPN
September 29	Night Stalker	ABC
October 1	Flight 29 Down	Discovery Kids
October 2	Sunday Pants	Cartoon Network
October 3	The Road Show	BET
October 4	Close to Home	CBS
October 5	The Adam Carolla Project	TLC
October 5	Related	The WB
October 5	Freddie	ABC
October 7	Hot Properties	ABC
October 9	Little Einsteins	Playhouse Disney
October 9	Johnny and the Sprites	Playhouse Disney
October 13	Run's House	MTV
October 16	Squidbillies	Adult Swim
October 17	The Colbert Report	Comedy Central
October 17	Pokémon: Advanced Challenge	Comedy Central
October 17	Miss Seventeen	MTV
October 28	I Shouldn't Be Alive	Discovery Channel
October 28	Masters of Horror	Showtime
October 30	But Can They Sing?	VH1
October 30	Homewrecker	MTV
October 30	Lucy, the Daughter of the Devil	Adult Swim
November 4	South of Nowhere	Noggin (during "The N" block)
November 5	IGPX	Toonami
November 6	The Boondocks	Adult Swim
November 6	Minoriteam	Adult Swim
November 7	Charlie and Lola	Playhouse Disney
November 25	The X's	Nickelodeon
December 4	Sleeper Cell	Showtime
December 6	Madden Nation	ESPN2
December 6	Party/Party	Bravo
December 15	Celebrity Eye Candy	VH1
December 18	Moral Orel	Adult Swim
December 19	Deal or No Deal	NBC
December 26	My Gym Partner's a Monkey	Cartoon Network
December 27	Ben 10	Cartoon Network
December 30	Mr. Meaty	Nickelodeon

=== Shows returning in 2005 ===
Show	Channel	Last aired	Returning
A Current Affair	Syndication	1996	March 21
Family Guy	Fox	2002	May 1
The Dating Game	Syndication	2000	May 4
SpongeBob SquarePants	Nickelodeon	2004	May 6
Dirty Jobs	Discovery Channel	2003	June 26
Zoboomafoo	PBS Kids	2001	July 16
Rugrats	Nickelodeon	2004	September 24

=== Shows ending in 2005 ===
Date	Show	Channel	Debut	Status
January 2	The Mountain	The WB	2004	Cancelled
January 2	Who's Your Daddy?	Fox Reality Channel	2005	Cancelled
January 8	The Will	CBS	2005	Cancelled
January 10	Battle for Ozzfest	MTV	2004	Cancelled
January 11	Celebrity Blackjack	GSN	2004	Cancelled
January 15	Megas XLR	Cartoon Network	2004	Cancelled
January 19	Center of the Universe	CBS	2004	Cancelled
January 20	Life as We Know It	ABC	2004	Cancelled
January 20	Century City	Universal HD	2004	Cancelled
January 22	Dave the Barbarian	Disney Channel	2004	Cancelled
January 24	Second Time Around	UPN	2004	Cancelled
January 26	The Club	Spike TV	2004	Cancelled
January 28	Grounded for Life	The WB	2001	Cancelled
February 11	Kudlow & Cramer	MSNBC	2002	Cancelled
February 11	Oobi	Noggin	2000	Cancelled
February 19	Kenny the Shark	Discovery Kids	2003	Cancelled
February 26	¡Mucha Lucha!	Kids' WB	2002	Cancelled
March 1	NYPD Blue	ABC	1993	Ended
March 11	Bullseye	CNBC	2003	Cancelled
March 13	Tilt	ESPN	2005	Cancelled
March 15	Committed	NBC	2005	Cancelled
March 18	The Screen Savers (returned in 2015)	G4	1998	Cancelled
March 21	The Osbournes	MTV	2002	Cancelled
March 25	Medical Investigation	NBC	2004	Cancelled
March 25	Life & Style	Syndication	2004	Cancelled
March 25	The Powerpuff Girls (returned in 2016)	Cartoon Network	1998	Cancelled
March 25	Star Wars: Clone Wars	Cartoon Network	2003	Cancelled
March 27	Carnivàle	HBO	2003	Cancelled
March 30	Newlyweds: Nick and Jessica	MTV	2003	Cancelled
March 30	American Dreams	NBC	2002	Cancelled
March 30	The Ashlee Simpson Show	MTV	2004	Cancelled
April 8	EGG, the Arts Show	PBS	2000	Cancelled
April 12	Curious Buddies	Nick Jr.	2004	Cancelled
April 13	Scientific American Frontiers	PBS	1990	Cancelled
April 15	8 Simple Rules	ABC	2002	Cancelled
April 16	LAX	NBC	2004	Cancelled
April 18	Fat Actress	Showtime	2005	Cancelled
April 20	Baby Looney Tunes	Cartoon Network	2002	Cancelled
April 21	Tru Calling	SciFi	2003	Cancelled
April 22	Joan of Arcadia	CBS	2003	Cancelled
April 24	Damage Control	MTV	2005	Cancelled
April 24	Strange Love	VH1	2005	Cancelled
April 25	Sealab 2021	Adult Swim	2000	Cancelled
April 25	Listen Up	CBS	2004	Cancelled
April 29	JAG	CBS	1995	Cancelled
May 3	Judging Amy	CBS	1999	Cancelled
May 6	Third Watch	NBC	1999	Cancelled
May 6	The Larry Elder Show	Syndication	1999	Cancelled
May 6	Zoom	PBS Kids Go!	1999	Cancelled
May 8	Queer Eye for the Straight Girl	Bravo	2005	Cancelled
May 11	Con	Comedy Central	2005	Cancelled
May 11	Jack & Bobby	The WB	2004	Cancelled
May 12	Project Greenlight (returned in 2015 and 2023)	Bravo	2001	Cancelled
May 13	Andromeda	Sci-Fi Channel	2000	Cancelled
May 13	Star Trek: Enterprise	UPN	2001	Cancelled
May 15	Page to Screen	Bravo	2002	Cancelled
May 15	Steve Harvey's Big Time Challenge	The WB	2003	Cancelled
May 16	Everybody Loves Raymond	CBS	1996	Ended
May 17	My Wife and Kids	ABC	2001	Cancelled
May 18	Kevin Hill	UPN	2004	Cancelled
May 18	Showdog Moms & Dads	Bravo	2005	Cancelled
May 20	Texas Justice	Syndication	2001	Cancelled
May 22	Kojak	USA	2005	Cancelled
May 22	Sue Thomas: F.B.Eye	PAX TV	2002	Cancelled
May 25	Street Smarts	Syndication	2000	Cancelled
May 25	The Jane Pauley Show	Syndication	2004	Cancelled
May 26	Pet Alien	Cartoon Network	2005	Cancelled
May 27	Father of the Pride	NBC	2004	Cancelled
May 27	Shop 'til You Drop	PAX TV	1991	Cancelled
May 27	U-Pick Live	Nickelodeon	2002	Cancelled
June 15	CatDog	Nickelodeon	1998	Cancelled
June 17	Complete Savages	ABC	2004	Cancelled
June 18	Skin	SOAPnet	2003	Cancelled
June 18	Game Show Moments Gone Bananas	VH1	2005	Cancelled
June 21	Blind Justice	ABC	2005	Cancelled
June 26	The Eyes of Nye	KCTS-TV	2005	Cancelled
June 28	Average Joe	NBC	2003	Cancelled
July 8	Jackie Chan Adventures	Kids' WB	2000	Cancelled
July 15	America's Castles	A&E	1994	Cancelled
July 16	Wild Card	Lifetime	2003	Cancelled
July 18	Summerland	The WB	2004	Cancelled
July 20	Sports Kids Moms & Dads	Bravo	2005	Cancelled
July 22	Video Mods	MTV2	2004	Cancelled
August 4	Kept	VH1	2005	Cancelled
August 4	Clubhouse	HDNet	2004	Cancelled
August 7	Queer as Folk	Showtime	2000	Cancelled
August 14	Viva La Bam	MTV	2003	Cancelled
August 19	The Proud Family	Disney Channel	2001	Cancelled
August 21	Six Feet Under	HBO	2001	Ended
August 30	Stella	Comedy Central	2005	Cancelled
September 2	60 Minutes II	CBS	1999	Cancelled
September 3	Midnight Love	BET	1985	Cancelled
September 7	Antiques Roadshow FYI	PBS	2005	Cancelled
September 30	Inconceivable	NBC	2005	Cancelled
October 1	Intimate Portrait	Lifetime	1994	Cancelled
October 7	Girls v. Boys	The N (Noggin)	2003	Cancelled
October 16	Barbershop	Showtime	2005	Cancelled
October 18	A Walk in Your Shoes	Noggin	1999	Cancelled
October 22	All That (returned in 2019)	Nickelodeon	1994	Cancelled
October 28	A Current Affair	Syndication	1986	Cancelled
October 30	Sunday Pants	Cartoon Network	2005	Cancelled
November 4	NewsNight with Aaron Brown	CNN	2001	Cancelled
November 8	Drew Carey's Green Screen Show	Comedy Central	2004	Cancelled
November 11	Duck Dodgers	Boomerang	2003	Cancelled
November 14	Power Rangers S.P.D.	Toon Disney	2005	Cancelled
November 25	Dragon Tales	PBS Kids	1999	Cancelled
November 25	Jay Jay the Jet Plane	PBS Kids	1998	Cancelled
November 27	Fatherhood	Nick at Nite	2004	Cancelled
December 2	The Road Show	BET	2005	Cancelled
December 2	$40 a Day	Food Network	2002	Cancelled
December 3	Trading Spaces: Boys vs. Girls	Discovery Kids	2003	Cancelled
December 4	But Can They Sing?	VH1	2005	Cancelled
December 6	Rubbadubbers	Noggin	2003	Cancelled
December 9	Three Wishes	NBC	2005	Cancelled
December 10	City Confidential (returned in 2021)	A&E	1998	Cancelled
December 15	Reunion	Fox	2005	Cancelled
December 18	Homewrecker	MTV	2005	Cancelled
December 19	Miss Seventeen	MTV	2005	Cancelled
December 20	The Adam Carolla Project	TLC	2005	Cancelled
December 21	Being Bobby Brown	Bravo	2005	Cancelled
December 21	The Apprentice: Martha Stewart	NBC	2005	Cancelled
December 25	Stroker and Hoop	Adult Swim	2004	Cancelled
December 30	Hot Properties	ABC	2005	Cancelled

=== Entering syndication in 2005 ===
Show	Seasons	In Production	Source
24	September 12, 2005 - July 10, 2009	Yes	
Alias	September 4, 2005 - June 10, 2007	Yes	
American Dragon: Jake Long	September 5, 2005 - September 15, 2013	No	
The Bernie Mac Show	September 12, 2005 - October 9, 2009	Yes	
Brandy & Mr. Whiskers	September 5, 2005 - June 16, 2013	No	
Dave the Barbarian	September 5, 2005 - October 31, 2010	Yes	
Even Stevens	September 5, 2005 - August 27, 2017	No	
Higglytown Heroes	September 5, 2005 - June 1, 2014	No	
JoJo's Circus	September 5, 2005 - June 1, 2014	No	
Kim Possible	September 5, 2005 - January 28, 2018	Yes	
Lilo & Stitch: The Series	September 5, 2005 - August 16, 2020	Yes	
Little Einsteins	October 17, 2005 - August 30, 2019	Yes	
Lizzie McGuire	September 5, 2005 - August 27, 2017	Yes	
My Wife and Kids	September 12, 2005 - May 27, 2011	Yes	
Phil of the Future	September 5, 2005 - August 27, 2017	No	
Sex and the City	September 12, 2005 - August 28, 2009	No	
Smallville	September 18, 2005 - April 8, 2007	Yes	
South Park	September 19, 2005 - September 14, 2012	Yes	
Stanley	September 5, 2005 - September 15, 2013	Yes	
Star Trek: Enterprise	September 10, 2005 - September 17, 2006	Yes	
The Buzz on Maggie	September 5, 2005 - January 22, 2010	Yes	
The Proud Family	September 5, 2005 - September 4, 2011	Yes	
The Suite Life of Zack & Cody	September 5, 2005 - June 17, 2018	Yes	
That's So Raven	September 5, 2005 - June 17, 2018	Yes	
Star Trek: Enterprise	September 10, 2005 - September 17, 2006	No	
South Park	September 19, 2005 - September 14, 2012	Yes	

=== Shows changing networks ===
Show	Moved from	Moved to
Journal Editorial Report	PBS	Fox News Channel
Project Greenlight	HBO	Bravo
TNA iMPACT!	Fox Sports Net	Spike TV
Drew Carey's Green Screen Show	The WB	Comedy Central
Whose Line is it Anyway?	ABC	ABC Family
Wildboyz	MTV	MTV2
WWE Raw	Spike TV	USA Network
6teen	Cartoon Network	Nickelodeon
Kipper	Nick Jr.	PBS Kids Sprout
Bob the Builder	Nick Jr.	PBS Kids Sprout
Teletubbies	PBS Kids	PBS Kids Sprout
Boohbah	PBS Kids	PBS Kids Sprout
Zoboomafoo	PBS Kids	PBS Kids Sprout
Jay Jay the Jet Plane	PBS Kids	PBS Kids Sprout
Sagwa, the Chinese Siamese Cat	PBS Kids	PBS Kids Sprout
Sesame Street	Noggin	PBS Kids Sprout
Baby Looney Tunes	Cartoon Network	Boomerang
American Casino	Discovery Channel	Travel Channel

=== Notable television films and specials ===
Title	Channel	Date of airing
Lackawanna Blues	HBO	February 12
Kim Possible Movie: So the Drama	Disney Channel	April 8
Warm Springs	HBO	April 30
The Proud Family Movie	Disney Channel	August 19
The Flight That Fought Back	Discovery Channel	September 11
Mrs. Harris	HBO	September 16
Twitches	Disney Channel	October 14
The Batman vs. Dracula	Cartoon Network	October 22

=== Miniseries ===
Title	Channel	Premiere date
Thief	FX	March 28
Elvis	CBS	May 8
Empire Falls	HBO	May 28
Into the West	TNT	June 10
Elizabeth I	HBO	September 29
Sleeper Cell	Showtime	December 4
The Triangle	Sci Fi Channel	December 5
The Lost Prince	PBS	December 18

== Networks and services ==
=== Launches ===
Network name	Type	Launch Date	Notes	Source
Military History Channel	Cable television	January 5		
Starz Comedy	Paid television	Unknown		
ESPNU	Cable television	March 4		
Crime & Investigation	Cable television	April 1		
Fox Soccer Plus	Cable and satellite	April 26		
The Tube Music Network	OTA television	June		
Logo TV	Cable television	June 30		
Retro TV	OTA television	July		
Current TV	Cable television	August 1		
Funimation Channel	Cable television	September 29		
KBS America	Cable television	October 6		
mHz Worldview	Cable television	October 19		
Latele Novela Network	Cable television	November 1		
MTV Chi	Cable television	December 6		
NRB TV	Cable television	December 21		
Smile of a Child	OTA television	December 24		

=== Conversions and rebrandings ===
Old network name	New network name	Type	Conversion Date	Notes	Source
G4TechTV	G4	Cable television	February 15		
Newsworld International	Current TV	Cable television	July 31		
International Channel	AZN Television	Cable television	Unknown		
Black Starz!	Starz in Black	Paid television	Unknown		
Starz! Theater	Starz Edge	Paid television	March 25		
Starz! Kids	Starz Kids & Family	Paid television	Unknown		
Starz! Family	Starz Kids & Family	Paid television	Unknown		
Action	Encore Action	Paid television	Unknown		
Love Stories	Encore Love	Paid television	March 25		
True Stories	Encore Drama	Paid television	March 25		
WAM! America's Kidz Network	Encore Wam	Paid television	Unknown		
Mystery	Encore Mystery	Paid television	Unknown		
Westerns	Encore Westerns	Paid television	Unknown		
Fox Sports World	Fox Soccer Channel	Cable television	March 28		
Speed Channel	Speed	Cable television	Unknown		
VH1 MegaHits	Logo	Cable television	June 30		
Pax TV	i: Independent Television	OTA television	July 1		
PBS Kids Channel	PBS Kids Sprout	Cable television	September 26		
Freeview	The 101 Network	Cable television	September 26		
Goodlife TV Network	AmericanLife TV Network	Cable television	Unknown		

== Television stations ==
=== Station launches ===
Date	City of License/Market	Station	Channel	Affiliation	Notes/Ref.
January 1	Columbia, South Carolina	WZRB	47	UPN	
March 24	Walsenburg, Colorado	K28HN	28	America One	
June 1	Alexandria, Louisiana	KBCA	41	The WB	
June 15	Hattiesburg, Mississippi	WHPM-LP	23	Fox	
July	Boise, Idaho	KKJB	39	America One	
July 1	Great Falls, Montana	KTGF-LP	50	NBC	Translator of KTVH/Helena
August	Lake Havasu City, Arizona	KBBA-LP	10	Independent	
October	Holbrook, Arizona	KNJO-LP	6	America One	
November 29	Ames/Des Moines, Iowa	KEFB	34	TBN	
Unknown date	Albany, Georgia	WALB-DT2	10.2	NBC Weather Plus	
Unknown date	Charlotte, North Carolina	WCEE-LP	16	TBN	
Unknown date	Chicago, Illinois	W55DF	55	MTV Tr3s	
Unknown date	Frederiksted, U.S. Virgin Islands	WEON-LP	60	Fox	
Unknown date	Marquette, Michigan	WLUC-DT2	6.2	The Tube Music Network	
Unknown date	Pittsburg, Kansas (Joplin, Missouri)	KPJO-LP	49	TBN	
Unknown date	Spokane, Washington	K09FZ	11	ABC	Translator of KXLY-TV/Spokane

== Births ==
Date	Name	Notability
January 4	Dafne Keen	Spanish and British actress
January 8	Collin Dean	Voice actor (Over the Garden Wall, The Loud House)
January 20	Carter Thorne	Canadian voice actor (PAW Patrol, PJ Masks)
January 31	Mallory James Mahoney	Actress (Bunk'd)
February 14	Jailen Bates	Actor (WITS Academy)
February 15	Nicolas Bechtel	Actor (Stuck in the Middle)
February 23	Arica Himmel	Actress (Mixed-ish)
March 14	Aiden Lewandowski	Actor
March 17	Flynn Morrison	Actor (Last Man Standing)
March 18	Ryan Alessi	Actor (All That)
March 26	Ella Anderson	Actress (Henry Danger, The Adventures of Kid Danger)
March 29	Brooklyn Shuck	Actress (Evil)
April 7	Nathan Janak	Actor (All That, Drama Club)
April 13	Brandon Severs	Actor (Walk the Prank)
April 19	Olivia Presti	Canadian actress (Odd Squad)
May 4	Navia Robinson	Actress (Raven's Home)
May 5	Gabrielle Nevaeh Green	Actress (All That, That Girl Lay Lay)
May 12	Ava Acres	Actress (Adventure Time, Crazy Ex-Girlfriend)
May 14	Maxwell Acee Donovan	Actor (Gabby Duran and the Unsittables)
May 19	Jack Gore	Actor (Billions, The Kids Are Alright)
June 2	Jadah Marie	Actress
June 14	Tamara Smart	Actress (Are You Afraid of the Dark?)
June 25	Kylie Cantrall	Actress (Gabby Duran & the Unsittables) and singer
June 27	Isaiah Crews	Actor (Side Hustle)
July 12	Issac Ryan Brown	Actor (Raven's Home, Puppy Dog Pals, The Owl House)
July 20	Alison Fernandez	Actress
July 22	Israel Johnson	Actor (Bunk'd)
August 3	Ramon Reed	Actor (Just Roll with It)
September 6	Shay Rudolph	Actress (The Baby-Sitters Club)
September 7	Ruth Righi	Actress (Sydney to the Max) and singer
September 7	Andrew Ortega	Actor (WITS Academy)
September 10	Sophia Forest	Actress (I Am Frankie)
September 30	Nathan Arenas	Actor (Bunk'd)
October 7	Lulu Wilson	Actress
October 16	Ruby Rose Turner	Actress (Coop & Cami Ask the World) and dancer
December 10	Kyliegh Curran	Actress (Secrets of Sulphur Springs)
December 14	Mia Sinclair Jenness	Actress (Fancy Nancy)
December 24	Jaxon Mercey	Canadian voice actor (Ryder on PAW Patrol)
December 30	Brady Noon	Actor (The Mighty Ducks: Game Changers)

== Deaths ==
Date	Name	Age	Notability
January 19	Lamont Bentley	31	Actor (Moesha, The Parkers) and rapper
January 23	Johnny Carson	79	Comedian, host of The Tonight Show
January 29	Bill Shadel	96	News anchor (ABC News)
February 12	Brian Kelly	73	Actor (Straightaway, Flipper)
March 25	Paul Henning	93	Producer (The Beverly Hillbillies, Petticoat Junction, Green Acres)
March 29	Johnnie Cochran	67	Lawyer
April 5	Debralee Scott	52	Actress, game show panelist (Mary Hartman, Mary Hartman, Match Game)
April 26	Mason Adams	86	Actor (Charlie Hume on Lou Grant)
May 17	Frank Gorshin	72	Actor (The Riddler on Batman)
May 21	Howard Morris	85	Actor, director (Your Show of Shows, The Flintstones, The Jetsons, The Andy Griffith Show, The Magilla Gorilla Show, The Archie Show, DuckTales, Garfield and Friends, Cow and Chicken, I Am Weasel)
May 22	Thurl Ravenscroft	91	Actor (Tony the Tiger of Kellogg's Frosted Flakes commercials)
May 26	Eddie Albert	99	Actor (Oliver Wendell Douglas on Green Acres, Frank MacBride on Switch)
June 24	Paul Winchell	82	Ventriloquist, actor (Wacky Races, Dastardly and Muttley in Their Flying Machines, Heathcliff, The Smurfs, Yogi's Treasure Hunt, Adventures of the Gummi Bears, The New Adventures of Winnie the Pooh)
June 25	John Fiedler	80	Actor (The Bob Newhart Show, Buffalo Bill, The New Adventures of Winnie the Pooh)
July 5	James Stockdale	81	Subject of In Love and War and participant in the 1992 vice presidential debate.
July 20	James Doohan	85	Actor (Scotty on original Star Trek)
August 4	Ileen Getz	43	Actress (3rd Rock from the Sun)
August 7	Peter Jennings	67	ABC news anchor
August 8	Barbara Bel Geddes	82	Actress ("Miss Ellie" on Dallas)
August 9	Matthew McGrory	32	Actor
August 23	Brock Peters	78	Actor
September 2	Bob Denver	70	Actor (Gilligan on Gilligan's Island and Maynard G. Krebs on The Many Loves of Dobie Gillis)
September 25	Don Adams	82	Actor (Get Smart, Tennessee Tuxedo, Inspector Gadget, Gadget Boy & Heather, Pepper Ann)
October 2	Nipsey Russell	87	Actor, comedian and game-show panelist
October 6	Ray Bumatai	52	Actor (Tito Makani on Rocket Power)
October 7	Charles Rocket	56	Actor (Saturday Night Live)
October 21	Tara Correa-McMullen	16	Actress
November 13	Eddie Guerrero	38	Professional wrestler and star of WWE SmackDown
November 24	Pat Morita	73	Actor (Sanford and Son, Happy Days, Ohara)
November 29	Wendie Jo Sperber	47	Actress (Babes, Bosom Buddies)
December 10	Richard Pryor	65	Actor, comedian (The Richard Pryor Show)
December 16	John Spencer	58	Actor (L.A. Law, The West Wing)
December 25	Vernon Roberts	94	Actor
December 26	Vincent Schiavelli	57	Actor (Hey Arnold!)

== See also ==
- 2005 in the United States
- List of American films of 2005
