= 2004 in American television =

In American television during 2004 notable events included television series debuts, finales, cancellations, and new channel initiations.

== Events ==
=== January ===
Date	Event
7	The Apprentice, a reality show franchise produced by Mark Burnett involving a test of skill to be 'hired' into a company, which was hosted by businessman Donald Trump (who would later become the nation's president in 2016), premieres its first episode. David Gould would be the first person fired.
19	British children's television series Boohbah (made by Ragdoll Productions who also made Teletubbies) premieres in the US on PBS Kids.
22	Who Wants to Be a Millionaire aired a spin-off of Who Wants to Be a Super Millionaire which offered its biggest cash prize in a game show history of $10,000,000. Only one contestant, Robert Essig, won at least $1,000,000 during the run, and no contestants won the top prize of $10,000,000.

=== February ===
Date	Event
1	Super Bowl XXXVIII airs on CBS, featuring the halftime show controversy occurring during a performance "Rock Your Body" by Janet Jackson and Justin Timberlake over indecency. The incident went viral and gave way to the rise of the term, "wardrobe malfunction"; in the wake of the incident, the Federal Communications Commission strengthened its rules concerning certain types of indecency, while Jackson was temporarily blacklisted from Viacom, CBS' parent company, along with other music websites, as well as having her invitation revoked for the then-upcoming Grammy Awards ceremony.
1	After 23 years, TBS quits using the superstation moniker.
11	The True Hollywood Stories sketch featuring Rick James and Charlie Murphy first airs on Chappelle's Show.
14	Jetix was introduced on Toon Disney and ABC Family, making it the first trade-name to be introduced as an anime-based block.
22	Sex and the City broadcasts its last episode on HBO, "An American Girl in Paris, Part Deux."

=== March ===
Date	Event
1	On CBS, The Price Is Right broadcasts its 6,000th episode.
1	PBS launched the HD network for the purpose of offering high definition and widescreen content 24 hours per day, seven days per week onto most PBS stations.
4	Rich Fields debuts as the new announcer for The Price is Right, a role he would hold until the end of Season 38.
8	Tiffany is named the new host of BET's The Center. Young Sir, who has been filling in since Amerie left last fall, takes over as the new host of BET.com Countdown.
8	In Casper, Wyoming, independent station/Pax TV affiliate KTWO-TV (having lost NBC to KCWY in September of last year) finally becomes an ABC affiliate after ABC's outgoing affiliate KFNB reaches an agreement with KTWO-TV ending its affiliation three months earlier than scheduled. KFNB then becomes a Fox affiliate, while sister station K26ES (now KWYF-LD) elevates its secondary UPN affiliation to full-time status.
15	Game Show Network began making the switch to their new rebranding, GSN.
18	The 57th episode of The Powerpuff Girls "See Me, Feel Me, Gnomey" airs in Canada on YTV, having been banned in the United States due to religious controversy.

=== April ===
Date	Event
1	Nickelodeon celebrates its 25th anniversary.
4	The Sesame Street primetime special "The Street We Live On" premieres on PBS.
5	The Australian soap Neighbours returns to U.S. television for the first time since 1991, on Oxygen.
12	KLSB-TV in Nacogdoches, Texas, a satellite station of NBC affiliate KETK-TV, separates from its parent station to become a CBS affiliate, returning CBS to the Tyler-Longview market for the first time since KLMG-TV became Fox affiliate KFXK-TV in April 1991. The next day, the Federal Communications Commission approves KLSB-TV's call letter change to the current KYTX.
16	C-SPAN aired a press conference being held in the White House Rose Garden in which President George W. Bush and British Prime Minister Tony Blair spoke about the war in Iraq and other issues. The event was far more watched than almost any other C-SPAN broadcast of the year, getting "shockingly high" Nielsen ratings. A similar broadcast on March 27 of the previous year was similarly widely viewed.

=== May ===
Date	Event
6	Friends ends its run after 10 years, broadcasting the last episode, "The Last One", on NBC. A spinoff, Joey, debuts on NBC the following season.
9	In CBS, season two contestant Amber Brkish proposed to season four contestant Rob Mariano before naming the former the "Sole Survivor" in the inaugural All-Stars season. Four days later, season seven contestant Rupert Boneham was also awarded the $1 million prize after voted for the most popular contestant in the America's Tribal Council special aired four days later.
11	NBCUniversal is founded by General Electric and Vivendi Universal.
13	Frasier broadcasts its last episode on NBC, "Goodnight, Seattle".
15	Jimmy Fallon makes his last appearance as a cast member of NBC's Saturday Night Live, for its season finale. The episode was hosted by Mary-Kate and Ashley Olsen with a musical performance of J-Kwon.
19	On NBC, Jerry Orbach makes his final appearance as Detective Lennie Briscoe on Law & Order. Orbach would soon move to the Law & Order franchise's third spin-off, Law & Order: Trial by Jury, and appear in the first two episodes, before his death on December 28, 2004.
26	Fantasia Barrino wins the third season of Fox's American Idol. This series also marked the first time it topped viewerships in the television ratings of this season.
27	Fox announced the cancellation of television special Seriously, Dude, I'm Gay, which was intended to air on June 7, 2004. The cancellation followed intense media backlash, such as from GLAAD, over the special's portrayal of gay men; the network attributed the cancellation to "creative reasons".
28	TechTV merges with G4 to form G4techTV, one of the most controversial mergers of television history as less than a year later, the merged network becomes G4 once again.

=== June ===
Date	Event
2	Ken Jennings of Salt Lake City, Utah, begins a long run as Jeopardy! champion.
4	TNA introduced their television program, Impact! and broadcast on Fox Sports Net.
7	ABC broadcasts its final NHL game for 17 years, which also turns out to be the last one before the lockout that canceled the league's 2004–05 season. Through ESPN, the network resumes airing NHL games in the 2021-22 season.
10	TBS reintroduces its Very Funny campaign.
11	Major networks cover the state funeral of Ronald Reagan.
11	The Wild Thornberrys ends with the episode "Eliza Unplugged".
14	Cartoon Network unveils a new logo for the first time in 11 years and a new branding that involve various animated characters living around a realistic CGI-themed city. The new branding known as "CN City", replaced the previous Powerhouse branding which had been in use for the past 7 years.
18	Rodney Dangerfield (who appeared more than seventy times as a guest on The Tonight Show) makes his final appearance as a talk show guest on CBS' The Late Late Show with Craig Kilborn. He died on October 5.

=== July ===
Date	Event
22	Documentary miniseries The Staircase is premiered in an abbreviated version as a special two-hour presentation of ABC's Primetime Thursday.
24	The infamous fight between Jason Varitek and Alex Rodriguez occurs during a Red Sox-Yankees game on Fox. That same night, the Red Sox came back with a two-run walk-off homer by Bill Mueller against closer Mariano Rivera.
27	During the Democratic National Convention, Illinois Senate candidate (and future president) Barack Obama delivers the keynote address. The speech is widely praised and is credited for his victory four years later.
30	Rocket Power ends with its two-part finale "The Big Day"

=== August ===
Date	Event
1	Rugrats aired its last episode titled "Hurricane Alice".
9	David Muir resigns as co-anchor of World News Now on ABC and is replaced by Ron Corning.
13	The animated comedy series Foster's Home for Imaginary Friends premieres on Cartoon Network starring Grey DeLisle as the voice of Frankie Foster, Keith Ferguson as the voice of Bloo and others.
15	In Charlottesville, Virginia, NBC affiliate WVIR-TV, long the only commercial station in its market, receives competition for the first time ever when WCAV signs-on as a CBS affiliate. Shortly thereafter, WCAV adds WVAW-LP as an ABC affiliate.
27	Craig Kilborn ends his five-year run as host of The Late Late Show.
28	PBS Kids Bookworm Bunch ended.
30	ABC affiliate WDTN in Dayton, Ohio swaps affiliations with NBC affiliate WKEF, reversing a swap that took place in 1980.

=== September ===
Date	Event
4	A series premiere promo for the Canadian animated series Atomic Betty, which is set to premiere on sister cable network Cartoon Network on September 17, accidentally airs on Kids' WB during the split screen credits of the Pokémon: Advanced episode "A Poké-Block Party".
5	British preschooler's program Thomas & Friends comes to PBS Kids as a stand-alone program with Michael Brandon taking over as the narrator.
11	Higglytown Heroes, created by George Evelyn, Holly Huckins, Denis Morella, Kent Redeker, and Jeff Ulin, airs on Playhouse Disney.
12	In Chicago, independent station WCIU drops Kids' WB. The city's WB affiliate WGN-TV, which had previously declined the block in favor of newscasts and sitcoms, picks up the block, and thus clears the entire WB schedule for the first time.
19	The 56th Primetime Emmy Awards are given out on ABC.
21	Drew Daniel is the winner of the U.S. version of Big Brother 5 on CBS. Runner-Up Michael "Cowboy" Ellis wins $50,000.
22	The pilot episode of Lost airs on ABC.
22	Veronica Mars premieres on UPN.
24	Kathleen Herles announces her retirement as voice of Dora on Dora the Explorer. Her final episode, "Dora Saves the Mermaids", would not air until November 2007.
28	Longtime veteran Marcy Walker makes her final appearance on the ABC soap opera All My Children after two decades of being affiliated with the program.
30	President Bush and Senator John Kerry participate in the first of the 2004 presidential debates moderated by Jim Lehrer.

=== October ===
Date	Event
2	Amy Poehler succeeds Jimmy Fallon as Tina Fey's co-anchor of NBC's Saturday Night Live's Weekend Update skit, making the first Weekend Update female duos.
2	Nickelodeon and its affiliated channels begin debuting special educational programming, Worldwide Day of Play, after the Let's Just Play campaign.
5	Gwen Ifill moderates the 2004 Vice Presidential debate between Vice President Cheney and Senator John Edwards at Case Western Reserve University.
8	Charles Gibson moderates the second presidential debate at Washington University in St. Louis.
11	PBS Kids debuts a programming block targeted at children aged 6–10 entitled PBS Kids Go!, with new shows Maya & Miguel and an Arthur spinoff, Postcards from Buster premiering.
13	Bob Schieffer of CBS News moderates the final presidential debate at Arizona State University.
15	Comedian Jon Stewart makes an appearance on Crossfire with Tucker Carlson and Paul Begala and calls the show out for "partisan hackery".
20	Game 7 of the ALCS is broadcast on Fox. The Boston Red Sox reverse-sweep the New York Yankees and become the first and (to date) only team in MLB history to come back from being down 3-0 in a playoff series.
27	The Boston Red Sox win the World Series title for the first time since 1918, with a total of 86 years. They swept the 105-win St. Louis Cardinals in four games. Sox closer Keith Foulke made the final out for underhanding the ball to Doug Mientkiewicz at first base after a grounder by Edgar Rentería (who coincidentally wore Babe Ruth's number 3). This officially marked the end of the Curse of the Bambino.
29	The fifth and final aired episode of Dr. Vegas aired on CBS. This marked the last time that Amy Adams appeared as a regular cast member on a television series, before returning many years later with Sharp Objects.

=== November ===
Date	Event
1	The Young and the Restless broadcasts its 8,000th episode on CBS.
7	Dallas airs a third TV movie, Dallas Reunion: The Return to Southfork, on CBS.
8	Young Sir resigns as host of BET.com Countdown and is replaced by recording artist Ray J.
9	Tiffany resigns as host of BET's The Center and is replaced by Julissa.
10	Sesame Street celebrates its 35th anniversary.
19	Hi Hi Puffy AmiYumi premieres on Cartoon Network with Janice Kawaye starring as Ami Onuki and Grey DeLisle, previously voicing Frankie Foster in Foster's Home for Imaginary Friends as Yumi Yoshimura.
23	Longtime CBS News anchor and manager editor Dan Rather announces he will step down in March.
30	After seventy-four consecutive wins, Ken Jennings finally loses on Jeopardy!, to competitor Nancy Zerg. Jennings' final cash winnings total is $2,522,700 making him the richest winner of American television history.

=== December ===
Date	Event
2	Tom Brokaw resigns as anchorman of NBC Nightly News and is replaced by Brian Williams.
15	CNN's financial news channel, CNNfn, is ended.
16	All My Children broadcasts its 9,000th episode.
29	Rogers Media buys remaining 20% ownership of Rogers Sportsnet from Fox.
29	General Electric, owner of NBC, purchases Universal Studios from Vivendi, leaving all six U.S. broadcast networks part of a company which also owns a movie studio.
29	For the first time in its history, Nielsen Media Research, the official American television ratings service, began counting original shows on pay television premium channels in its prime-time ratings. At the time, most of these were broadcast by competitors HBO and Showtime, but Starz has since begun producing original shows.

== Programs ==
=== Debuts ===
Date	Debut	Network
January 7	The Apprentice	NBC
January 11	Drake & Josh	Nickelodeon
January 14	Seven Little Monsters	PBS Kids
January 18	Whoopi's Littleburg	Nick Jr.
January 18	The L Word	Showtime
January 19	Boohbah	PBS Kids
January 19	My Big Fat Obnoxious Fiance	Fox
January 21	'Til Death Do Us Part: Carmen and Dave	MTV
January 23	Dave the Barbarian	Disney Channel
January 26	The Koala Brothers	Playhouse Disney
January 28	College Hill	BET
February 14	Power Rangers Dino Thunder	ABC Family
March 1	Forever Eden	Fox
March 3	Kingdom Hospital	ABC
March 4	Pimp My Ride	MTV
March 5	The Help	The WB
March 7	Nickelodeon Splat!	Nickelodeon
March 9	Cracking Up	Fox
March 10	Game Over	UPN
March 12	Touching Evil	USA
March 12	Playing It Straight	Fox
March 12	Wonderfalls	Fox
March 16	Century City	CBS
March 17	The Stones	CBS
March 19	The D.A.	ABC
March 21	Deadwood	HBO
March 21	Animal Face-Off	Discovery Channel
April 2	The Big House	ABC
April 3	Danny Phantom	Nickelodeon
April 7	The Swan	Fox
April 12	Peep and the Big Wide World	Discovery Kids
April 13	Showbiz Moms & Dads	Bravo
April 28	Shorties Watchin' Shorties	Comedy Central
May 1	Megas XLR	Cartoon Network
May 17	Superstar USA	The WB
May 17	On the Cover	PAX TV
May 17	Colonial House	PBS
May 27	Pepsi Smash	The WB
June 1	Summerland	The WB
June 1	Wanna Come In?	MTV
June 2	BBQ with Bobby Flay	Food Network
June 3	Come to Papa	NBC
June 4	TNA iMPACT!	Fox Sports Networks
June 8	The Jury	Fox
June 8	Blow Out	Bravo
June 14	North Shore	Fox
June 14	The Casino	Fox
June 14	Next Action Star	NBC
June 16	Quintuplets	Fox
June 16	Method & Red	Fox
June 16	The Ashlee Simpson Show	MTV
June 18	Phil of the Future	Disney Channel
June 20	Fatherhood	Nick at Nite
July 1	Trading Spouses	Fox
July 6	Seconds From Disaster	National Geographic Channel
July 12	I Love the '90s	VH1
July 16	Stargate Atlantis	Sci Fi
July 18	Entourage	HBO
July 21	Rescue Me	FX
July 22	Studio 7	The WB
July 28	Amish in the City	UPN
July 29	Blue Collar TV	The WB
July 30	O'Grady	The N
July 31	Justice League Unlimited	Cartoon Network
August 1	Stroker and Hoop	Adult Swim
August 2	Balderdash	PAX TV
August 2	Blue's Room	Nick Jr.
August 4	The Player	UPN
August 13	Foster's Home for Imaginary Friends	Cartoon Network
August 21	Brandy & Mr. Whiskers	Disney Channel
August 30	The Jane Pauley Show	Syndication
August 30	Dance 360	Syndication
August 31	Curious Buddies	Nick Jr.
August 31	Father of the Pride	NBC
September 1	Hawaii	NBC
September 7	Miss Spider's Sunny Patch Friends	Nick Jr.
September 9	Joey	NBC
September 9	Medical Investigation	NBC
September 11	The Batman	Kids' WB
September 11	Da Boom Crew	Kids' WB
September 12	Jack & Bobby	The WB
September 12	Ned's Declassified School Survival Guide	Nickelodeon
September 12	Unfabulous	Nickelodeon
September 13	A Place of Our Own	PBS
September 13	Dog Whisperer with Cesar Millan	National Geographic Channel
September 13	The Insider	Syndication
September 13	Life & Style	Syndication
September 13	Pat Croce’s Moving In	Syndication
September 13	The Jason Dolley Show	Syndication
September 13	The Jonah Hill Show	Syndication
September 13	The Larry Elder Show	Syndication
September 13	The Tony Danza Show	Syndication
September 13	The Benefactor	ABC
September 13	LAX	NBC
September 13	Higglytown Heroes	Playhouse Disney
September 16	Video Mods	MTV
September 17	Atomic Betty	Cartoon Network
September 18	Super Robot Monkey Team Hyperforce Go!	Jetix
September 20	Listen Up	CBS
September 20	Home Delivery	Syndication
September 20	Second Time Around	UPN
September 21	Rodney	ABC
September 22	CSI: NY	CBS
September 22	The Mountain	The WB
September 22	Veronica Mars	UPN
September 22	Lost	ABC
September 24	Complete Savages	ABC
September 24	Dr. Vegas	CBS
September 26	Clubhouse	CBS
September 26	Wife Swap	ABC
September 28	Laguna Beach: The Real Orange County	MTV
September 29	Kevin Hill	UPN
October 2	Darcy's Wild Life	Discovery Kids
October 2	Austin Stevens: Snakemaster	Animal Planet
October 2	Faith Under Fire	PAX TV
October 3	Boston Legal	ABC
October 3	Desperate Housewives	ABC
October 3	Cold Turkey	PAX TV
October 4	Model Citizens	PAX TV
October 5	BET Style	BET
October 5	Wanda Does It	Comedy Central
October 5	Second Verdict	PAX TV
October 6	Ghost Hunters	Sci Fi
October 6	Proof Positive	Sci Fi
October 6	World Cup Comedy	PAX TV
October 7	Drew Carey's Green Screen Show	The WB
October 7	Life as We Know It	ABC
October 11	The Backyardigans	Nick Jr.
October 11	Maya & Miguel	PBS Kids Go!
October 11	Postcards From Buster	PBS Kids Go!
October 18	Battlestar Galactica	Sci Fi
October 19	The Biggest Loser	NBC
October 19	He's a Lady	TBS
October 24	You've Got a Friend	MTV
October 25	Battle for Ozzfest	MTV
October 27	Center of the Universe	CBS
October 27	Drawn Together	Comedy Central
November 3	Nanny 911	Fox
November 5	Cartoon Alley	TCM
November 7	Perfect Hair Forever	Adult Swim
November 7	Huff	Showtime
November 7	My Big Fat Obnoxious Boss	Fox
November 8	ToddWorld	Ready Set Learn! on TLC and Discovery Kids
November 8	$25 Million Dollar Hoax	NBC
November 9	The Rebel Billionaire: Branson's Quest for the Best	Fox
November 14	Tom Goes to the Mayor	Adult Swim
November 15	Date My Mom	MTV
November 16	House	Fox
November 19	Hi Hi Puffy AmiYumi	Cartoon Network
November 29	Family Face Off: Hollywood	Nick at Nite
December 1	Project Runway	Bravo
December 15	Big Man on Campus	The WB
December 18	W.I.T.C.H.	Jetix

=== Returning this year ===
Show	Last aired	Previous network	New/Same network	Returning
House of Mouse	2003	Toon Disney	Disney Channel	August 11
Thomas & Friends	2000	Nick Jr.	PBS Kids	September 5
Sagwa, the Chinese Siamese Cat	2002	PBS Kids	Same	September 26
Teletubbies	2001	PBS Kids	Same	October 30
Little Bear	2003	Nick Jr. Channel	Same	November 16

=== Ending this year ===
Date	Show	Channel	Debut	Status
January 16	He-Man and the Masters of the Universe	Cartoon Network	2002	Cancelled
January 23	Fillmore!	Toon Disney	2002	Cancelled
January 25	10-8: Officers on Duty	ABC	2003	Cancelled
January 28	Becker	CBS	1998	Cancelled
January 29	Threat Matrix	ABC	2003	Cancelled
January 30	Boston Public	Fox	2000	Cancelled
January 30	The Handler	CBS	2003	Cancelled
February 3	Sabrina's Secret Life	DIC Kids Network	2003	Cancelled
February 6	Jake 2.0	UPN	2003	Cancelled
February 6	Ed	NBC	2000	Cancelled
February 6	Little Bill	Nickelodeon	1999	Cancelled
February 7	Scout's Safari	Discovery Kids	2002	Cancelled
February 12	All About the Andersons	The WB	2003	Cancelled
February 14	Lizzie McGuire	Disney Channel	2001	Cancelled
February 22	Sex and the City (returned in 2021 as And Just Like That...)	HBO	1998	Ended
February 27	Lloyd in Space	Toon Disney	2001	Cancelled
February 29	The Weekenders	Toon Disney	2000	Cancelled
March 3	'Til Death Do Us Part: Carmen and Dave	MTV	2004	Cancelled
March 13	Hack	CBS	2002	Cancelled
March 17	The Mullets	UPN	2003	Cancelled
March 20	The Tracy Morgan Show	NBC	2003	Cancelled
March 25	The Chris Isaak Show	Showtime	2001	Cancelled
April 1	Stripperella	Spike	2003	Cancelled
April 2	Game Over	UPN	2004	Cancelled
April 4	Home Movies	Adult Swim	2001	Cancelled
April 6	It's All Relative	ABC	2003	Cancelled
April 9	The D.A.	ABC	2004	Cancelled
April 9	Life with Bonnie	ABC	2002	Cancelled
April 12	Space Ghost Coast to Coast (returned in 2006)	Cartoon Network	1994	Cancelled
April 14	Karen Sisco	ABC	2003	Cancelled
April 16	The Help	The WB	2004	Cancelled
April 20	Happy Family	NBC	2003	Cancelled
April 20	Whoopi	NBC	2003	Cancelled
April 22	Like Family	The WB	2003	Cancelled
April 23	Married to the Kellys	ABC	2003	Cancelled
April 24	WWE Confidential	TNN/Spike TV	2002	Cancelled
April 27	I'm with Her	ABC	2003	Cancelled
April 28	Rolie Polie Olie	Playhouse Disney	1998	Cancelled
April 29	The Jamie Kennedy Experiment	The WB	2002	Cancelled
April 30	Living It Up! with Ali & Jack	Syndication	2003	Cancelled
May 1	The District	CBS	2000	Cancelled
May 4	The Guardian	CBS	2001	Cancelled
May 6	Friends (returned in 2021 as Friends: The Reunion)	NBC	1994	Ended
May 7	Run of the House	The WB	2003	Cancelled
May 10	The Parkers	UPN	1999	Cancelled
May 13	Frasier (returned in 2023)	NBC	1993	Ended
May 14	The News with Brian Williams	CNBC	1996	Cancelled
May 16	The Practice	ABC	1997	Cancelled
May 17	Mutant X	Syndication	2001	Cancelled
May 17	She Spies	NBC	2002	Cancelled
May 19	Angel	The WB	1999	Cancelled
May 19	Showbiz Moms & Dads	Bravo	2004	Cancelled
May 21	Ricki Lake	Syndication	1993	Cancelled
May 21	The 5th Wheel	Syndication	2001	Cancelled
May 21	The Wayne Brady Show	Syndication	2001	Cancelled
May 22	Static Shock	Kids' WB	2000	Cancelled
May 25	Rock Me Baby	UPN	2003	Cancelled
May 25	Colonial House	PBS	2004	Cancelled
May 26	Soul Food	Showtime	2000	Cancelled
May 28	The Sharon Osbourne Show	Syndication	2003	Cancelled
May 29	Justice League	Cartoon Network	2001	Cancelled
May 30	Line of Fire	ABC	2003	Cancelled
June 4	Hollywood Squares (returned in 2025)	Syndication	1966	Ended
June 5	The Restaurant	NBC	2003	Cancelled
June 7	Whoopi's Littleburg	Nickelodeon	2004	Cancelled
June 8	Hey Arnold!	Nickelodeon	1996	Cancelled
June 11	The Wild Thornberrys	Nickelodeon	1998	Cancelled
June 19	The Man Show	Comedy Central	1999	Cancelled
June 25	VH1 ILL-ustrated	VH1	2003	Cancelled
June 28	The Division	Lifetime	2001	Cancelled
July 2	Slime Time Live	Nickelodeon	2000	Cancelled
July 5	Ozzy & Drix	Kids' WB	2002	Cancelled
July 16	I Love the '90s	VH1	2004	Cancelled
July 27	King of the Jungle	Animal Planet	2003	Cancelled
July 29	106 & Park: Prime	BET	2003	Cancelled
July 30	Rocket Power	Nickelodeon	1999	Cancelled
August 1	Rugrats	Nickelodeon	1991	Cancelled
August 2	Who Wants to Marry My Dad?	NBC	2003	Cancelled
August 8	The Brothers García	Nickelodeon	2000	Cancelled
August 9	For Love or Money	NBC	2003	Cancelled
August 10	The Joe Schmo Show (returned in 2013)	Spike	2003	Cancelled
August 17	Teamo Supremo	Toon Disney	2002	Cancelled
August 17	Nickelodeon Splat!	Nickelodeon	2004	Cancelled
August 27	Johnny Bravo	Cartoon Network	1997	Cancelled
September 1	It's a Miracle	PAX TV	1998	Cancelled
September 8	The Drew Carey Show	ABC	1995	Ended
September 10	Pyramid (returned in 2012)	Syndication	1973	Cancelled
September 10	The Berenstain Bears	PBS Kids	2003	Cancelled
September 12	Oliver Beene	Fox	2003	Cancelled
September 12	Animal Face-Off	Animal Planet	2004	Cancelled
September 24	Jeremiah	Showtime	2002	Cancelled
September 25	Samurai Jack	Cartoon Network	2001	Cancelled
September 27	Out of the Box	Playhouse Disney	1998	Cancelled
October 1	Knock First	ABC Family	2003	Cancelled
October 6	Hawaii	NBC	2004	Cancelled
October 11	SpongeBob SquarePants (returned in 2005)	Nickelodeon	1999	Cancelled
October 22	Evil Con Carne	Cartoon Network	2003	Cancelled
October 25	The Benefactor	ABC	2004	Cancelled
October 29	Dr. Vegas	CBS	2004	Cancelled
October 31	The New Detectives	Discovery Channel	1996	Cancelled
October 31	Dead Like Me	Showtime	2003	Cancelled
November 11	Unscrewed with Martin Sargent	TechTV	2003	Cancelled
November 11	Insomniac with Dave Attell	Comedy Central	2001	Cancelled
November 14	He's a Lady	TBS	2004	Cancelled
November 16	Wanda Does It	Comedy Central	2004	Cancelled
November 26	Stanley	Playhouse Disney	2001	Cancelled
November 28	Doc	PAX TV	2001	Cancelled
December 8	Proof Positive	Sci Fi Channel	2004	Cancelled
December 10	Players	G4	2002	Cancelled
December 12	My Big Fat Obnoxious Boss	Fox	2004	Cancelled
December 12	You've Got a Friend	MTV	2004	Cancelled
December 15	Wonderfalls	Fox	2004	Cancelled
December 16	Shorties Watchin' Shorties	Comedy Central	2004	Cancelled

=== Made-for-TV movies ===
Title	Channel	Date of airing
Pixel Perfect	Disney Channel	January 16
12 Days of Terror	Discovery Channel	May 1
Zenon: Z3	Disney Channel	June 11
Stuck in the Suburbs	Disney Channel	July 16
Tiger Cruise	Disney Channel	August 6
House of Bloo's	Cartoon Network	August 13
Halloweentown High	Disney Channel	October 8

=== Entering syndication this year ===
Show	Seasons	In Production	Source
CSI: Crime Scene Investigation	September 20, 2004 - September 16, 2006	Yes	
Fear Factor	September 20, 2004 - September 15, 2006	Yes	
Gilmore Girls	September 13, 2004 - March 18, 2007	Yes	
Girlfriends	September 13, 2004 - September 9, 2007	Yes	
Malcolm in the Middle	September 13, 2004 - September 10, 2010	Yes	
Yes, Dear	September 13, 2004 - September 15, 2006	Yes	

=== Shows changing networks ===
Show	Moved from	Moved to
Arthur	PBS Kids	PBS Kids Go!
Cyberchase	PBS Kids	PBS Kids Go!
As Told by Ginger	Nickelodeon	Nicktoons
Fillmore!	ABC Kids	Toon Disney
Timothy Goes To School	PBS Kids	TLC
The Surreal Life	The WB	VH1
National Geographic Explorer	MSNBC	National Geographic Channel
Project Greenlight	HBO	Bravo
America's Most Talented Kid	NBC	PAX TV

== Networks and services ==
=== Launches ===
Network	Type	Launch date	Notes	Source
ESPN Deportes	Cable television	January 7		
TV One	Cable television	January 19		
Hallmark Movies & Mysteries	Cable television	January 20		
MTVU	Cable television	January 20		
Si TV	Cable television	February 25		
Cinema One	Cable television	May		
World Channel	Cable television	May 4		
The Pentagon Channel	Cable television	May 14		
Wealth TV	Cable television	June 1		
IndiePlex	Cable television	June 8		
History Channel en Espanol	Cable television	June 24		
ImaginAsian	Cable television	August 30		
TCM	Cable television	September 1		
Altitude Sports and Entertainment	Cable and satellite	September 4		
Hustler TV	Cable television	October 1		
Maverick Television	Cable television	October 1		
Gospel Music Channel	Cable television	October 30		
NBC Weather Plus	Cable television	November 15		

=== Conversions and rebrandings ===
Old network name	New network name	Type	Conversion date	Notes	Source
Discovery Home & Leisure Channel	Discovery Home Channel	Cable television	March 29		
TechTV	G4TechTV	Cable television	May 28		

=== Closures ===
Network	Type	Closure date	Notes	Source
CNNfn	Cable television	December 15		

== Television stations ==
=== Station launches ===
Date	City of License/Market	Station	Channel	Affiliation	Notes/Ref.
March 1	Idaho Falls, Idaho	KPIF	15	America One; The WB	
May 5	Rehoboth Beach/Dover, Delaware (Salisbury, Maryland)	W59DZ	59	UATV	
July 31	Knoxville, Tennessee	WMAK	7	Independent	
August 5	Charlotte Amalie, U.S. Virgin Islands	WZVI	43	ABC	
August 15	Charlottesville, Virginia	WCAV	19	CBS	
August 15	West Palm Beach, Florida	WBWP-LP	57	Independent	
August 25	Juneau, Alaska	K17HC	17	UPN	
November	Cheyenne, Wyoming	KWYP-TV	6 (now on 8)	PBS	Part of Wyoming PBS
November 1	Youngstown, Ohio	WFMJ-DT2	21.2	The WB	
November 15	Peoria/Bloomington, Illinois	WEEK-DT2	25.2	NBC Weather Plus	
November 15	San Juan, Puerto Rico	W25DN	25	Independent	
December 3	Durango, Colorado	KRMU	20	PBS	Part of Rocky Mountain PBS
December 17	Dededo/Hagåtña, Guam (Agana)	KEQI-LP	22	Independent	
Unknown date	Albuquerque, New Mexico	KNMD-TV	9	PBS	
Unknown date	Borger/Amarillo, Texas	KEYU	31	Univision	
Unknown date	Charlotte Amalie, U.S. Virgin Islands	WVGN-LP	19	NBC	
Unknown date	Columbia, Missouri	KZOU-LP	22	UPN	
Unknown date	Flint, Michigan	WBSF	46	The WB	
Unknown date	Kailua/Honolulu, Hawaii	KKAI-TV	50	Faith TV	
Unknown date	Lafayette, Indiana	W65EH	65	Independent	
Unknown date	Nacogdoches, Texas	KLSB-LP	53	NBC	Translator of KETK-TV/Jacksonville, Texas
Unknown date	Victoria, Texas	K17FS	17	NBC	

=== Network affiliation changes ===
Date	City of License/Market	Station	Channel	Old affiliation	New affiliation	Notes/Ref.
Unknown date	Bellingham, Washington (Vancouver, British Columbia, Canada)	KBCB	34	Jewelry Television	ImaginAsian	
Unknown date	Sun Valley/Twin Falls, Idaho	KIDA	5	UPN	Independent	

== Births ==
Date	Name	Notability
January 4	Peyton Kennedy	Canadian actress (Odd Squad, Everything Sucks!)
January 7	Sofia Wylie	Actress (Andi Mack, High School Musical: The Musical: The Series)
January 8	Berkley Silverman	Canadian voice actress (PAW Patrol)
January 9	Tyree Brown	Actor (Parenthood)
January 24	Brandon Rossel	Actor (Fast Layne, Ultra Violet & Black Scorpion)
January 26	Addison Riecke	Actress (The Thundermans)
February 19	Millie Bobby Brown	English actress (Stranger Things) and model
March 4	Donielle T. Hansley Jr.	Voice actor (Darwin on The Amazing World of Gumball (2017–18))
March 1	Izabella Alvarez	Actress (Walk the Prank, The Loud House, The Casagrandes)
March 10	Mace Coronel	Actor (Nicky, Ricky, Dicky & Dawn)
March 21	Forrest Wheeler	Actor (Fresh Off the Boat)
April 5	Christopher Martinez	Actor (Warped!)
April 6	Casey Simpson	
April 17	Kyla Drew Simmons	
April 19	Caleel Harris	Voice actor (Blaze and the Monster Machines, The Loud House)
May 22	Peyton Elizabeth Lee	Actress (Andi Mack)
June 4	Mackenzie Ziegler	Actress (Dance Moms)
June 7	Saara Chaudry	Canadian actress (Max & Shred)
June 8	Francesca Capaldi	Actress (Dog with a Blog)
June 15	Sissy Sheridan	Actress
June 16	Charlie Bushnell	Actor (Diary of a Future President)
June 22	Laya DeLeon Hayes	Actress
July 4	Dylan Kingwell	Actor
July 28	Lauren Lindsey Donzis	Actress (Liv and Maddie)
August 5	Albert Tsai	Actor (Trophy Wife, Dr. Ken, Coop and Cami Ask the World)
August 14	Marsai Martin	Actress (Black-ish)
August 19	Siena Agudong	Actress (Star Falls)
August 26	Hannah Nordberg	Actress (Fancy Nancy)
September 1	Iam Tongi	Singer (American Idol)
September 10	Emmy Perry	Actress
October 3	Noah Schnapp	Actor (Stranger Things)
October 9	Tomaso Sanelli	Actor (Star Falls)
October 30	Elisha Henig	Actor
November 1	Jayden Bartels	Actress (Side Hustle)
November 11	Oakes Fegley	Actor
November 17	Andre Robinson	Voice actor (Clyde McBride on The Loud House (Episode 101 onwards))
November 27	Jet Jurgensmeyer	Actor
December 3	Ruby Jay	Actress (Rapunzel's Tangled Adventure, Fancy Nancy)
December 4	Sophie Pollono	Actress (Fast Layne)
December 5	Jules LeBlanc	Actress (Side Hustle)
December 12	Sky Katz	Actress (Raven's Home)
December 14	Timothy Colombos	Actor (WITS Academy)
December 17	Dakota Lotus	Actor (Coop and Cami Ask the World)
December 18	Isabella Cramp	Actress (Shimmer and Shine, Colony, Vampirina)
December 22	Bryce Gheisar	Actor (Walk the Prank, The Astronauts, Are You Afraid of the Dark?)
December 28	Miles Brown	Actor (Black-ish)
December 30	Lyliana Wray	Actress (Are You Afraid of the Dark?)

== Deaths ==
Date	Name	Age	Notability
January 17	Noble Willingham	72	Actor (C.D. Parker on Walker, Texas Ranger)
January 19	Jerry Nachman	57	MSNBC editor-in-chief
January 23	Bob Keeshan	76	Children's show host (Captain Kangaroo)
January 27	Jack Paar	85	Host of (The Tonight Show)
January 29	Mary-Ellis Bunim	57	Producer and co-creator of The Real World
February 15	Jan Miner	86	Actress (Madge the Manicurist)
February 23	Carl Anderson	58	Actor (Another World)
February 24	John Randolph	88	Actor (Grand)
March 7	Paul Winfield	64	Actor (King, 227)
March 8	Robert Pastorelli	49	Actor (Murphy Brown)
March 17	J. J. Jackson	64	MTV VJ
March 26	Jan Sterling	82	Actress
March 27	Art James	74	Game show host and announcer
April 1	Carrie Snodgress	58	Actress
April 13	Caron Keating	41	British TV presenter
May 9	Alan King	76	Comedian and actor
May 14	Anna Lee	91	Actor (Lila Morgan Quartermaine on General Hospital from 1978 to 2003)
May 17	Tony Randall	84	Actor (Felix on The Odd Couple)
May 21	Gene Wood	78	Announcer of (Family Feud and other game shows)
May 22	Richard Biggs	44	Actor
June 5	Ronald Reagan	93	Actor and U.S. president; host of General Electric Theater and Death Valley Days
July 6	Eric Douglas	46	Actor
July 9	Isabel Sanford	86	Actress (Louise "Weezie" Mills Jefferson on The Jeffersons)
July 28	Eugene Roche	75	Actor (Soap, Webster, more)
August 13	Julia Child	91	Host of The French Chef on PBS
September 4	Michael Louden	40	Actor (As the World Turns)
September 15	Johnny Ramone	55	Singer-songwriter (Ramones)
October 5	Rodney Dangerfield	82	Actor and comedian (The Dean Martin Show, frequent Tonight Show guest)
October 10	Christopher Reeve	52	Actor
November 7	Howard Keel	85	Actor, singer (Clayton Farlow on Dallas)
December 28	Jerry Orbach	69	Actor (Lennie Briscoe on Law & Order)

== See also ==
- 2004 in the United States
- List of American films of 2004
