= America's Prom Queen =

- Starring: Katelyn Morgan (winner)starring Lashell Alexander
- Judges: Brooke Hogan; Susan Schulz; Jai Rodriquez; Theo Von
- Country of origin: United States
- No. of seasons: 1
- No. of episodes: 6

Production
- Running time: 60 minutes (44 without commercials)

Original release
- Network: ABC Family (2008)
- Release: March 17 – April 21, 2008

America's Prom Queen is a reality TV series created by consumer marketer Krishnan Menon and produced by PB&J Television that debuted on ABC Family on March 17, 2008. The show follows 10 girls aspiring for the title of "America's Prom Queen". Each week, the girls face a prom-related challenge, and girls will be eliminated until one remains. The show is hosted by former Miss USA, Susie Castillo. On April 21, 2008, Katelyn was crowned America's Prom Queen.

== Contestants ==
- Torree Whitney, from Anaheim, CA - Eliminated in Episode 1
- Niah Chapman, from Arlington, MA - Eliminated in Episode 2
- Samantha Fox, from Costa Mesa, CA - Eliminated in Episode 3
- LaShell Alexander, from Burbank, CA - Eliminated in Episode 4
- Kendra Cucino, from Providence, RI - Eliminated in Episode 5
- Carmen Matheny, from Cleveland, TN - Eliminated in Episode 5
- Ashley Arillotta, from North Andover, MA - Eliminated in Episode 5
- Macy Erwin, from Chattanooga, TN - Runner-Up
- Amanda Eugenio, from Peabody, MA - Runner-Up
- Katelyn Morgan, from Yorba Linda, CA - Winner

== Committee members ==
- Brooke Hogan, recording artist and television personality
- Susan Schulz, editor-in-chief of CosmoGIRL! magazine
- Jai Rodriguez, actor, musician, and star of Queer Eye for the Straight Guy
- Theo Von, stand-up comedian and former Road Rules contestant
- Sean Kingston, singer (guest judge in Episode 2)
- Spencer Grammer, actress and star of Greek (guest judge in Episode 5)
- Robert Adamson, actor and star of Lincoln Heights (guest judge in Episode 6)

== Episodes and eliminations ==
| Episode (Date) | Called Down to Carpet |
| 1. "Prom Princesses" (March 17, 2008) | Torree | Katelyn | LaShell |
| 2. "Dance, Dance, Dance" (March 24, 2008) | Niah | Macy |
| 3. "Prom-a-palooza" (March 31, 2008) | Samantha | Macy | LaShell |
| 4. "The 'Senior' Prom" (April 7, 2008) | LaShell | Carmen | Kendra |
| 5. "CosmoProm" (April 14, 2008) | Kendra | Carmen | Ashley |
| 6. "The Promisode" (April 21, 2008) | Macy | Amanda | Katelyn |

== Summaries ==
| Contestant | Elimination chart | | | | | |
| Contestant | 1 | 2 | 3 | 4 | 5 | 6 |
|---|---|---|---|---|---|---|
| Katelyn | BTM 2 | SAFE | WIN | SAFE | WIN | WINNER |
| Amanda | SAFE | SAFE | SAFE | WIN | SAFE | OUT |
| Macy | SAFE | BTM 2 | BTM 2 | SAFE | SAFE | OUT |
| Ashley | WIN | SAFE | SAFE | SAFE | OUT | |
| Carmen | SAFE | SAFE | SAFE | BTM 2 | OUT | |
| Kendra | SAFE | WIN | SAFE | BTM 3 | OUT | |
| LaShell | BTM 3 | SAFE | BTM 3 | OUT | | |
| Samantha | SAFE | SAFE | OUT | | | |
| Niah | SAFE | OUT | | | | |
| Torre | OUT | | | | | |
