= KBBA =

KBBA may refer to:

- KBBA-LD, a defunct low-power television station (channel 14) formerly licensed to serve Cedar Falls, Iowa, United States
- KBBA-LP, a defunct low-power television station (channel 10) formerly licensed to serve Lake Havasu City, Arizona, United States
