= Colleen Taylor =

American journalist

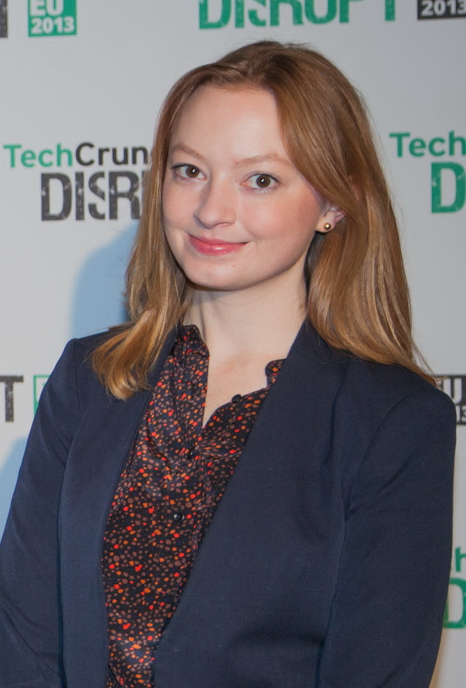
- Colleen Taylor at TechCrunch Disrupt Europe: Berlin 2013
- Known for: Journalism

Colleen Taylor (born 1983 or 1984) is an American journalist who became the first political correspondent for CosmoGIRL! magazine.

== Biography ==
Taylor earned her Bachelor of Arts degree from Columbia University and first appeared in CosmoGIRL! as the teen magazine's first political correspondent. Starting in May 2004, her monthly column, "Born to Vote," covered her experiences on the campaign trail during the 2004 presidential election. In October 2004, she was named one of the YouthVote Coalition's "30 Under 30," 30 people under the age of 30 who the organization said "continue to increase civic participation, build responsive government, or promote public awareness about the value of participation in democracy through research or discovery."

Since 2006, she had focused much of her work on the technology industry, covering the semiconductor industry for Electronic News and startups, accelerators and venture capital firms, including Y Combinator, as well as Ellen Pao and other business professionals for TechCrunch in 2015. She was also the editorial director for TechCrunch TV.

In June 2015, she was hired by Y Combinator as its editorial director.
