= American Storm (dance troupe) =

- Promotional Poster of American Storm's Cast
- Formation: 2005
- Type: Theatre group
- Purpose: erotic
- Location: Las Vegas
- Website: http://www.americanstorm.org/

American Storm is an all-male revue that performs in Las Vegas, Nevada. The dance troupe was formed with the finalists from VH1's reality TV series Strip Search. The show is produced by SPI Entertainment, Inc. and Cross Productions, who also produce Australia's Thunder from Down Under.

== History ==
After much success with Strip Search in Australia and Manpower Male Revue, Billy Cross ventured to America on his next project. Strip Search travelled across the small towns of the United States interviewing "average joes" to be performers.

The American Storm boys performed at the Riviera until 2009 when they moved to the V Theatre at Planet Hollywood's Miracle Mile Shops. In early 2012 the troupe moved to the Plaza located in downtown Las Vegas. American Storm briefly performed at db's pong and pool from November 30, 2012 - March 16, 2013.

== Cast ==
The current cast has six members. Terry and Tony Cress, twins.

King Shaw, who was on the show from 2005-08 was removed due to sexual assault on a cast member. Shaw was kicked off of the show and served time in federal prison.

== Cast history ==
	2005	2006	2007	2008	2009	2010	2011	2012
Josh Hall	✓	✓	✓	✓	✓	✓	✓	✓
Tommy Gainor	✓	✓	✓	✓	✓	✓	✓	✓
Justin Kurtis	✗	✓	✓	✓	✓	✓	✓	✓
Terry Cress	✓	✓	✓	✓	✓	✓	✓	✓
Cody Anders	✗	✗	✗	✗	✗	✗	✗	✓
Tony Cress	✓	✓	✓	✓	✓	✓	✓	✓
Steve Kim	✗	✗	✓	✓	✓	✓	✓	✗
Sway Dizzle	✓	✓	✓	✓	✓	✗	✗	✗
Sean Cassidy	✓	✓	✓	✓	✗	✗	✗	✗
David	✓	✓	✓	✓	✗	✗	✗	✗
King Shaw	✓	✓	✓	✓	✗	✗	✗	✗
Meatball	✓	✓	✓	✓	✗	✗	✗	✗

=== Awards and recognition ===
American Storm was named “Best Male Strip Show 2008” by the Las Vegas Review-Journal.

Both Tony Cress and Josh Hall were voted “One of the 20 Most Beautiful People in Las Vegas” by JackColton.com.

Sean Cassidy was on the cover of Fitness RX for men's Magazine January 2006
