= Susan Schulz =

Former American magazine editor

- Born: Susan Eileen Schulz; October 5, 1971 (age 54); Westchester County, New York
- Education: Loyola University Maryland
- Occupations: Communications consultant, former magazine editor
- Notable credit(s): Editorial assistant, Redbook; Assistant editor, Good Housekeeping; Associate/senior editor, YM; Editor-in-chief, CosmoGirl

Susan Schulz, who also goes by Susan Schulz Wuornos (born October 5, 1971), is an American editor and communications consultant best known for being the editor-in-chief of CosmoGirl magazine, the teenage spin-off of Cosmopolitan magazine, from 2003 to 2008.

== Early life ==
Schulz was born in 1971 to Iva and Richard Schulz of White Plains, New York. In 1993, she earned a bachelor's degree from Loyola University Maryland, then called Loyola College, in Baltimore.

== Magazine career ==
Schulz began her magazine career as an editorial assistant at Redbook magazine in 1994.

In July 2003, Schulz became editor-in-chief of CosmoGirl after the founding editor, Atoosa Rubenstein, left CosmoGirl to lead Seventeen magazine. Before the promotion, Schulz had been the executive editor of CosmoGirl. In December 2008, Hearst ended the print publication of CosmoGirl, and Schulz was then moved to a position at the company working on special projects. Schulz at one time had the title editorial brand director of Cosmopolitan and managed such projects as Cosmo Books and a Cosmopolitan clothing line at JCPenney.

== Writing credits ==
For the nonfiction book Cat Women: Female Writers on Their Feline Friends (Seal Press, 2007), Schulz contributed a short essay on her cat dying one week before her wedding.

== Other work ==
From 2021 to 2022, Schulz worked as vice president/marketing director for the nonprofit organization Muscular Dystrophy Association. Before that, for five years, she was marketing director for the nonprofit organization New York Academy of Sciences.

Schulz has served on the board of directors, in the role of secretary, for GlamourGals, a nonprofit organization that pairs teenage volunteers with seniors to provide companionship.
