= Rachel Barr =

American academic

Rachel Barr is a professor at Georgetown University.

She is currently the co-director of graduate studies in the Department of Psychology at Georgetown University. Her research focuses on understanding the learning and memory mechanisms that develop during infancy. Because infants are preverbal, her techniques rely on imitation and learning methods to find out what infants have learned and how well and how long they remember it. Her previous research has focused on how infants pick up information from different media sources, television, siblings, adults, and different contexts. Most recently, Barr's studies focus on factors that might enhance infant learning from television.

Barr's lab is called the Georgetown Early Learning Project.

In 2005, Barr became part of the Sesame Beginnings Advisory Board, which included other "national child development and media experts". This year also marked her involvement in the ZERO TO THREE Leaders Development Initiative. In addition, Barr has worked as a supervisor and voiceover for Nick Jr.'s Curious Buddies series of videos aimed at infants and toddlers.

She is currently a reviewer for many popular and prestigious peer journals including: Journal of Experimental Child Psychology, Infant Behavior and Development, Developmental Psychobiology, Developmental Psychology, Developmental Science, Current Directions in Psychological Science, Archives of Pediatric and Adolescent Research, Child Development, Infant and Child Development. Her posters and presentations are often found at international child development conferences such as SRCD and ISIS.

Her education includes a Ph.D. in Developmental Psychology (completed in 1998), Diploma in Clinical Psychology, and BSc. (Hons) in Psychology from the University of Otago.
