= Lost Worlds (TV series) =

Documentary series by The History Channel

- Lost Worlds title screen
- Narrated by: Corey Johnson
- Country of origin: United States
- Original language: English
- No. of seasons: 2
- No. of episodes: 32

Production
- Producer: Atlantic Productions
- Running time: approx. 44 minutes

Original release
- Network: History Channel
- Release: April 4, 2005 – December 5, 2007

Lost Worlds is a documentary television series by the History Channel that explores a variety of "lost" locations from ancient to modern times. These "great feats of engineering, technology, and culture" are revealed through the use of archaeological evidence, interviews with relevant experts while examining the sites, and CGI reproductions. These visual re-creations take the form of rendered 3D environments and photo manipulated overlays, allowing the "lost world" to be seen over its present-day state.

The pilot episode "Palenque: Metropolis of the Maya" was first aired on April 4, 2005. It was followed by 12 more episodes in 2006, and a further 19 episodes in 2007.

== Episodes ==
Number of Episodes	Episode title	Present location	Original air date
1	Palenque: Metropolis of the Maya	Mexico	April 4, 2005
2	Knights Templar	Syria	July 10, 2006
3	Atlantis	Crete, Santorini	July 17, 2006
4	Ramses' Egyptian Empire	Egypt	July 24, 2006
5	Athens - Ancient Supercity	Greece	July 31, 2006
6	Secret Cities of the A-Bomb	United States	August 7, 2006
7	Hitler's Supercity	Germany	August 14, 2006
8	Jesus' Jerusalem	Palestine	August 21, 2006
9	Churchill's Secret Bunkers	England	August 28, 2006
10	The Real Dracula	Romania	September 4, 2006
11	Braveheart's Scotland	Scotland	September 11, 2006
12	The First Christians	Greece, Italy, Turkey	September 18, 2006
13	The Pagans	England	September 25, 2006
14	Seven Wonders of the World	Egypt, Greece, Iraq, Turkey	August 1, 2007
15	Kama Sutra	India	August 8, 2007
16	Secret A-Bomb Factories	United States	August 15, 2007
17	Henry VIII's Mega Structures	England	August 22, 2007
18	Secret U.S. Bunkers	United States	August 29, 2007
19	Herod the Great	Palestine	September 5, 2007
20	Building the Titanic	Ireland	September 12, 2007
21	Sin City of the West	United States	September 19, 2007
22	The Vikings	Denmark, England, Iceland	September 26, 2007
23	Al Capone's Secret City	Chicago (United States)	October 3, 2007
24	Lost Superpower of the Bible	Turkey	October 10, 2007
25	Stalin's Supercity	Russia	October 17, 2007
26	City of Armageddon	Palestine	October 24, 2007
27	Jekyll & Hyde	Scotland	October 31, 2007
28	Age of Airships	Germany, United States	November 7, 2007
29	Ivan the Terrible's Fortress	Russia	November 14, 2007
30	Pirates of the Caribbean	Jamaica	November 21, 2007
31	Taj Mahal	India	November 28, 2007
32	Lost City of Aphrodisias	Turkey	December 5, 2007

== Release on DVD ==
Each episode was made available on DVD on its original air date. The first 13 episodes were released as a 4-DVD box set on January 30, 2007.
