= Celebrity Eye Candy =

- Genre: Reality/Comedy
- Written by: Jackie Cohen; Sean Gottlieb; Megan Neuringer
- Country of origin: United States
- Original language: English
- No. of seasons: 2

Production
- Producer: Paul Kaup
- Running time: 60 minutes

Original release
- Network: VH1
- Release: December 15, 2005 – 2007

Celebrity Eye Candy is a television series on VH1 that first aired on December 15, 2005. It features photos and videos of celebrities the paparazzi took within the past week.

== Content ==
Frequently the celebrities were shown in a poor light.

The host of the show is never seen and is a voice-over only. He often opens the show with a humorous song about the video that was presented over the course of the show. In addition, the host normally sings a few songs about celebrities doing normal things, such as scratching an itch or grocery shopping.

== History ==
The show initially aired weekly episodes for approximately 4 months but with mediocre ratings. It was put on hiatus in July 2006. It returned in February 2007, on a more sporadic airing basis.
