= Proof Positive (TV series) =

- Starring: Amanda Tapping
- Country of origin: United States
- No. of episodes: 10

Production
- Running time: 60 minutes (including commercials)

Original release
- Network: Sci Fi Channel
- Release: October 6 – December 8, 2004

Proof Positive is a paranormal investigation reality television show broadcast by the Sci Fi Channel beginning on October 6, 2004, through December 8, 2004. It was shown as part of the "SciFi Wednesday" evening schedule line up in the United States along with other reality television programs as Scare Tactics and Ghost Hunters. Proof Positive ran for ten episodes.

The show was hosted by actress Amanda Tapping of Stargate SG-1 and Sanctuary.

== Episode format ==
During the first three segments of the program, the show investigated three different unexplained phenomena subjects such as ghost hauntings, remote viewing, past life regression, alien abductions and UFO sightings. During the fourth and final segment of the program, the show takes whatever evidence was gathered and hands it over to professionals for examination. For example; a video tape with alleged UFO footage would be examined by professional video or special effects experts to determine if the footage is genuine or fake. Once the evidence is examined, the show reveals the findings.

- If the evidence is proven authentic, the show would conclude it as "Proof Positive."
- If the evidence is determined to be a hoax, or not paranormal related, the show would conclude it as "Proof Negative."
- If the evidence could not be verified, the show would give it a "Proof Inconclusive."

Only one of the segments in each episode would be given a proof positive. Before the commercial break at the end of the third segment, the audience would be asked which of the three segments they think would be concluded positive.

The program's purpose was to only validate the authenticity of evidence from a paranormal encounter and not to prove that the paranormal activity exists. For example, if a photo of a flying saucer was declared "proof positive" by the show, it does not prove beyond a reasonable doubt that flying saucers exist. The show would simply validate that the photo was a picture of something unexplained, appearing in the sky, that was really there, and was not apparently faked in any way.

== List of Proof Positive episodes ==
"Episode 101"

- Policeman's Past Life - an Indiana detective believes he is a reincarnation of artist James Carroll Beckwith. Deemed "Proof Positive"
- Michigan Lighthouse Ghost - a mysterious light appears within an inoperable light house. Deemed "Proof Negative"
- Roswell Rods - the show studies evidence of elongated, multi-winged "insects" called Rods that are caught on videotape. Deemed "Proof Negative"

"Episode 102"

- Little Boy Ghost - a family believes the spirit of a seven-year-old boy haunts their Georgia home. Deemed "Proof Negative"
- Psychic Artists - a psychic team draws images of deceased loved ones as evidence that they can communicate with the dead. Deemed "Proof Positive"
- Lizard Man Sightings - the show investigates a legend that a South Carolina swamp is haunted by a humanoid lizard creature. Deemed "Proof Negative"

"Episode 103"

- Alien Abduction - a man presents evidence that he has been abducted by aliens. Deemed "Proof Negative"
- Firehouse Ghost - members of a fire house believe it is haunted by a firefighter who died in the 1920s. Deemed "Proof Inconclusive"
- Remote Viewing - the show explores psychic-viewing techniques once used by the CIA. Deemed "Proof Positive"

"Episode 104"

- Mexico UFO Sighting - a family shows their videotape evidence of a strange object in the night sky. Deemed "Proof Positive"
- Haunted Brothel - the show investigates a Nevada brothel where it is believed a spirit lurks in the VIP room. Deemed "Proof Negative"
- Disaster Precognition - the show studies individuals who claim they have had dreams of disaster events before they happened. Deemed "Proof Inconclusive"

"Episode 105"

- Haunted Axe-Murder House - visitors to an axe-murder house in Villisca, Iowa claim they see ghostly orbs. Deemed "Proof Negative"
- Alien Residue - a woman claiming to have been abducted by aliens presents a strange substance as evidence. Deemed "Proof Negative"
- Confederate General Past Life - a Connecticut fire-fighter claims he is the reincarnation of American Civil War General John B. Gordon. Deemed "Proof Positive"

"Episode 106"

- Colorado UFO Sighting - a Colorado man shows his video tape evidence of a UFO. Deemed "Proof Inconclusive"
- Psychic Detectives - the show interviews two detectives who use psychic impressions to solve cold cases. Deemed "Proof Positive"
- Willard Library Ghost - security cameras supposedly catch a ghostly woman seen in an Indiana library. Deemed "Proof Negative"

"Episode 107"

- Junkyard Haunting - the spirit of a car-crash victim is believed to be caught on a wrecking yard security camera. Deemed "Proof Inconclusive"
- Roswell UFO Crash Material - the show tests material claimed to be extraterrestrial in origin. Deemed "Proof Negative"
- Aura Photography - the show studies human auras caught on film with a special camera. Deemed "Proof Positive"

"Episode 108"

- Illinois UFO Sighting - police officers claim to have chased after a UFO that flew over several rural towns in Illinois. Deemed "Proof Positive"
- Chupacabra - two biologists believe they have DNA evidence of a blood-sucking creature in Puerto Rico. Deemed "Proof Inconclusive"
- Gettysburg Haunting - a ghost hunting team shows their video evidence of spirits lurking in a Gettysburg battlefield. Deemed "Proof Inconclusive"

"Episode 109"

- Lake Ogopogo Monster - the show investigates a Loch Ness Monster-like creature that is believed to lurk in a Canadian lake. Deemed "Proof Negative"
- Haunted Restaurant - patrons believe the spirit of a young girl haunts a Baltimore restaurant. Deemed "Proof Positive"
- Spontaneous Combustion - a town in Sicily is plagued by household objects that mysteriously burst into flame. Deemed "Proof Inconclusive"

"Episode 110"

- Telepathic Twins - the show investigates stories of possible psychic links between twins. Deemed "Proof Positive"
- Haunted Prison - the show investigates a West Virginia penitentiary supposedly haunted by ghosts of former inmates. Deemed "Proof Negative"
- The Electric Man - a man claims he emanates a field that causes electronic devices to malfunction. Deemed "Proof Negative"
