= Miss Seventeen =

2005 American reality television show

- Genre: Reality
- Created by: Atoosa Rubenstein
- Judges: Atoosa Rubenstein
- No. of seasons: 1
- No. of episodes: 10

Production
- Executive producer: Atoosa Rubenstein
- Production companies: Actuality Productions; Hearst Entertainment

Original release
- Network: MTV
- Release: October 17 – December 19, 2005

Miss Seventeen is a reality television series on MTV that aired from October 17, 2005 to December 19, 2005. The show consisted of 17 young women competing for an internship at Seventeen magazine and a college scholarship. Atoosa Rubenstein was the main judge, she was the youngest editor-in-chief ever to run Seventeen. They picked 17 girls from around the United States who were not only photogenic but also had been at the top of their class, to provide a role model for young women. The girls were flown to New York, where they would take part in a contest similar in format to The Apprentice — they would be given tasks to be done by Atoosa, and in each episode one of the girls would be eliminated from the competition. The winner would get her face on the cover of Seventeen, a college scholarship, and would be offered an internship job on the magazine.

The criteria for elimination were not only performing poorly — Atoosa was watchful of how the girls talked when no one else was in the room, via cameras set up around the house. In this manner, she could watch the girls with their guards down and see what their real motivations and dreams were. In one elimination, for example, Atoosa sat down with the girl and explained that she didn't feel that the girl was in the contest for the 'right' reasons — video clips were shown to the viewers which showed the girl talking to her other roommates and explaining that she was more interested in the face-time she would get for being part of an MTV show.

Where the format differed from other shows was in the first elimination round and in how the contestants found out who was eliminated. In the first episode, all 17 girls sat around the dinner table with Atoosa and had to describe in brief who they were and what they hoped they would get out of the experience. Based on this conversation, Atoosa eliminated 7 of the girls from the contest. The way the girls would generally find out who was eliminated was by sitting around a TV as Atoosa would talk to them, telling them the results of the tasks they were given. The TV screen would then display the names of the girls who would be staying in the house, written in cursive form. The girl whose name didn't appear on 'The List' was eliminated, and met with Atoosa to hear her reasoning for why she was eliminated.

In the final episode, Jennifer Steele was declared the winner, with her magazine cover unveiled in Times Square. It was also revealed that Brianne Burrowes, who voluntarily left the show in an early episode of the series, was offered a job by Atoosa and will be working with Jennifer in their respective internships at the magazine.

== Contestants ==
Name	Hometown	Achievements
Brittney	Peachtree City, Georgia	National Champion Cheerleader
Sasha Kelly Jackson	Brooklyn, New York	President, Black Student Union
Jennifer Steele	Whitewater, Wisconsin	Miss Cheerleader Of America Finalist
Caroline Donofrio	West Allenhurst, New Jersey	Student Council President
Amber	Windom, Minnesota	High School Class President
Skyler L. Johnson	Atlanta, Georgia	Economics Major, Harvard University
Jessica Velez	Glassboro, New Jersey	Homecoming Queen
Kristen	Methuen, Massachusetts	Editor, High School Newspaper
Nicole	Staten Island, New York	Pre-Law, St. John's University
Brianne Burrowes	Polson, Montana	Montana High School Journalist Of The Year
Maria Sajjad	Concord, California	Muslim Student Association, UCLA
Jill Belsley	Morton, Illinois	Congressional Page
Savannah	Grand Prairie, Texas	Miss Tarrant County
Leah	Little Rock, Arkansas	Dean's List, Vanderbilt University
Julie	Coppell, Texas	Varsity Tennis MVP
Ashley	Lamarque, Texas	National Math Honour Society
Connie	San Bernardino, California	High School Valedictorian

== Episodes ==
No.	Title	Original release date
1	"The First Cut"	October 17, 2005
2	"Becoming Famous"	October 24, 2005
3	"The Girls Visit MTV"	October 31, 2005
4	"Unexpected Goodbyes"	November 7, 2005
5	"Hamptons Visit"	November 14, 2005
6	"Dorm Room Décor"	November 21, 2005
7	"Camping Out"	November 28, 2005
8	"Styling Session"	December 5, 2005
9	"Office Skills"	December 12, 2005
10	"So This Is It"	December 19, 2003

== Link ==
Official Website
