= Party/Party =

- Genre: Reality television
- Country of origin: United States
- Original language: English
- No. of seasons: 1
- No. of episodes: 6

Production
- Executive producers: Fenton Bailey; Randy Barbato
- Producer: Todd Radnitz
- Running time: 42 minutes
- Production company: World of Wonder Productions

Original release
- Network: Bravo
- Release: December 6, 2005 – January 25, 2006

Party/Party is an American reality television series that premiered on December 6, 2005, on Bravo, as a lead-in to Queer Eye. Announced in June 2005 as It's My Party, the one-hour series features parents as they try to put their best effort in order to throw the most memorable party for their beloved children. Each episode follows two different families who prepare for very similar parties using their own methods and ideas.

"[The show] puts a unique twist on a familiar concept," said Lauren Zalaznick, the president of the network. "This series aims to uncover what leads parents to invest so much in the celebrations of their children's major rites of passages," she also added.
