= Showbiz Moms & Dads =

2004 American reality television series

- Genre: Reality television
- Country of origin: United States
- Original language: English
- No. of seasons: 1
- No. of episodes: 7

Production
- Executive producers: Fenton Bailey; Randy Barbato; David Perler; Frances Berwick; Amy Introcaso-Davis; Shari Levine
- Running time: 42 minutes
- Production company: World of Wonder

Original release
- Network: Bravo
- Release: April 13 – May 19, 2004

Showbiz Moms & Dads is an American reality television series that aired on Bravo from April 13 to May 19, 2004. The series features children and their parents who aspire to success in entertainment. It was canceled after seven episodes.

The network subsequently aired several similar shows, including Showdog Moms & Dads and Sports Kids Moms & Dads.

== Cast ==
The reality series followed these families:

- The Barrons: Jordan, a 14-year-old aspiring actress and her mother.
- The Klingensmiths: Shane, a 13-year-old aspiring singer and actor and his mother.
- The Moseley-Stephens: Jordan, an 8-year-old actress and her mother.
- The Nutters: A family of seven aspiring child and teenage actors. The children and their parents later appeared on The Oprah Winfrey Show and the father, Duncan Nutter, was a contestant on Battle of the Network Reality Stars.
- The Tyes: Emily, a 4-year-old beauty pageant contestant and her mother.
