= KEFB =

Television station in Ames, Iowa (2005–2016)

- Ames–Des Moines, Iowa; United States
- City: Ames, Iowa
- Channels: Digital: 34 (UHF); Virtual: 34

Programming
- Affiliations: TBN (2005–2016)

Ownership
- Owner: Family Educational Broadcasting, Inc.

History
- Founded: July 12, 1996
- First air date: November 29, 2005
- Last air date: September 20, 2016
- Former channel numbers: Analog: 34 (UHF, 2005–2009)
- Call sign meaning: Educational Family Broadcasting

Technical information
- Facility ID: 82619
- ERP: 37.23 kW
- HAAT: 154 m (505 ft)
- Transmitter coordinates: 41°58′49″N 93°44′23″W

KEFB (channel 34) was a religious television station licensed to Ames, Iowa, United States, which served the Des Moines area as an affiliate of the Trinity Broadcasting Network (TBN). Owned by Family Educational Broadcasting, the station maintained a transmitter southwest of Ames. In addition to TBN programming, KEFB also served the community as an independent educational station.

== History ==
The station was originally granted a construction permit on July 12, 1996. The station would not be officially granted a full license until 2005, when it was granted the call letters KEFB.

=== Shutdown ===
On September 20, 2016, Family Educational Broadcasting announced it was permanently discontinuing all operations of KEFB and returning the station's license to the Federal Communications Commission (FCC). KEFB's license was formally canceled and its callsign deleted on October 5, 2016. TBN programming remains available in the Des Moines–Ames area via the network's national feed on Mediacom channel 92.

== Technical information ==
=== Subchannels ===
The station's digital signal was multiplexed:

Subchannels of KEFB
Subchannel	Res.	Short name	Programming
34.1	480i	KEFB-DT	TBN (4:3)
34.2	480i	KEFB-DT	Hillsong Channel (4:3)

=== Analog-to-digital conversion ===
KEFB shut down its analog signal, over UHF channel 34, on June 12, 2009, and "flash-cut" its digital signal into operation on UHF channel 34. Because it was granted an original construction permit after the FCC finalized the DTV allotment plan on April 21, 1997, the station did not receive a companion channel for a digital television station.
