= Strip Search (TV series) =

2001 reality TV series

- Genre: Reality

Original release
- Release: 2001

Strip Search is a reality television series, first broadcast in 2001.

The series follows the search for a new troupe of male strippers from audition to the final live show. First broadcast in New Zealand in 2001, versions have been made in Australia, the United Kingdom, Germany, Canada and the United States.

The format is virtually identical in each series: men are invited to audition for the show, and during a number of tasks, including a boot camp, the numbers are whittled down until the final troupe perform for a live audience.

The original New Zealand troupe was called "Kiwi Fire". In the same vein, the Australian troupe was called "Aussie Storm", the UK troupe was named "UK Storm", the Canadian group was dubbed "Canadian Thunder" and the American troupe was named "American Storm". The series was masterminded by Billy Cross, an Australian entrepreneur who had success on the Las Vegas Strip with an Australian troupe entitled "Manpower".

== Controversy ==
The series generated some controversy in the UK, when one of the finalists, Warren Hudson, organised various protests alleging the show was a scam, and that the promise of work as a result of the series never materialised.
