= Latele Novela Network =

Spanish-language television network in the United States

- Type: Cable Television Network
- Country: United States
- Availability: United States; Puerto Rico; New Zealand; Australia
- Headquarters: Coral Gables, Florida
- Owner: DreamHouse Entertainment
- Key people: Alexander Fiore (President and CEO); Alexander Kochen (COO); Mercedes Pedre-Fiore (Senior V.P.)
- Launch date: November 1, 2005
- Picture format: 480i (SD); 720p/1080i (HD)
- Official website: www.latelenovela.com
- Language: Spanish

Latele Novela Network (Spanish pronunciation: [laˈteleˈnoβela]) is a Spanish-language television network in the United States. It is the first premier national Hispanic television network dedicated entirely to telenovelas in Spanish, specially curated for the US Hispanic market. It was launched on November 1, 2005

== See also ==
- List of United States television networks

== External links and sources ==
- Official site (in Spanish)
- Official corporate site
- Spanish International Network historical site

Citations
