= Showdog Moms & Dads =

Television series

- Genre: Reality television
- Country of origin: United States
- Original language: English
- No. of seasons: 1
- No. of episodes: 8

Production
- Executive producers: Fenton Bailey; Randy Barbato
- Producer: Todd Radnitz
- Running time: 42 minutes
- Production company: World of Wonder

Original release
- Network: Bravo
- Release: March 30 – May 18, 2005

Showdog Moms & Dads is an American reality television series that premiered on the Bravo cable network on March 30, 2005. The reality series features five pet owners who are involved in show dog hobby. They prepare their dogs for various dog shows around the country, and ultimately meet each other as competitors at National Dog Show in Philadelphia.

The show premiered following the success of another reality series entitled Showbiz Moms & Dads; and Sports Kids Moms & Dads which aired after Showdog Moms & Dads ended.
