= Atoosa Rubenstein =

Iranian-American former magazine editor (born 1972)

- Born: Atoosa Behnegar; 20 January 1972 (age 54); Tehran, Imperial State of Iran
- Education: Barnard College (BA)
- Known for: Magazine editor
- Spouse: Ari Rubenstein (divorced)
- Children: 3

Atoosa Rubenstein (born Atoosa Behnegar, Persian: آتوسا بهنگار; 13 January 1972) is an Iranian-American former magazine editor. She was the editor-in-chief of Seventeen magazine and the founding editor of CosmoGirl. She went on to found Big Momma Productions, Inc. and Atoosa.com before becoming a stay at home mother.

== Early life and education ==
Born as Atoosa Behnegar in Tehran, Iran, her father Mansoor Behnegar was a colonel in the Iranian Air Force, and immigrated with the family to Queens, New York, when she was three. The family later relocated to Malverne, on Long Island.

As an undergraduate student at Barnard College, Rubenstein became a public relations intern at Lang Communications, the company that bought Sassy magazine. She worked at Carvel and retail stores to pay her bills. Rubenstein dropped out of Alpha Chi Omega sorority and took night classes to take part in her second magazine internship, which led to a position in the editorial department of American Health magazine.

== Honors and awards ==
Columbia University honored Rubenstein in 2004 by naming her one of the top 250 alumni through the ages. She was also recognized by the Girl Scout Council of Greater New York as a Woman of Distinction. Rubenstein has been featured in Crain's New York Business "40 Under 40" and Folio's "30 Under 30".

She is a member of the Candie’s Foundation Board of Directors, which helps educate young people about the consequences of teen pregnancy.

== Career ==
In 1993, Rubenstein became a fashion assistant at Cosmopolitan and five years later was made the senior fashion editor. This led to Hearst Magazines president Cathleen Black asking Rubenstein to come up with a concept for a new magazine. Forty-eight hours later Rubenstein presented the idea of CosmoGIRL! and was offered the position of editor-in-chief. This made Rubenstein, who was 26 years old at the time, the youngest editor-in-chief in Hearst Magazine's 100-year history. Rubenstein went on to make CosmoGIRL! a success with a circulation of 1.25 million readers.

In May 2003, Hearst Magazines bought Seventeen magazine and gave Rubenstein the position of editor-in-chief. Rubenstein reversed a five-year decline in Seventeen's newsstand sales and delivered total newsstand growth of 23% by the end of 2005.

In the fall of 2005, a series that Rubenstein conceived titled Miss Seventeen, debuted on MTV. The series featured seventeen girls competing for the honor of being Miss Seventeen – an award that included a college scholarship, an internship at Seventeen, and a cover and spread for the publication. Rubenstein was the creator and an executive producer on the series.

She appeared in several episodes of the reality show series America's Next Top Model.

On 7 November 2006, she announced that she would be leaving Seventeen to launch her own teen-centered web business, write a book, and start a consulting firm specializing in the youth market. Her replacement was Ann Shoket. In December 2006, Rubenstein started Big Momma Productions, Inc.

== Personal life ==
Rubenstein was married to Ari Rubenstein, the founder and managing partner of Global Trading Systems, a stock, commodity and foreign currency trading company. They separated in 2020.

In 2008, Rubenstein gave birth to a daughter. She later gave birth to twins.

In 2023, Rubenstein announced she had been diagnosed with breast cancer.

== See also ==
- List of Iranian women journalists
