= Sports Kids Moms & Dads =

- Genre: Reality television
- Country of origin: United States
- Original language: English
- No. of seasons: 1
- No. of episodes: 8

Production
- Executive producers: Fenton Bailey; Randy Barbato; Randy Barbato
- Running time: 42 minutes
- Production company: World of Wonder

Original release
- Network: Bravo
- Release: June 1 – July 20, 2005

Sports Kids Moms & Dads is an American reality television series that premiered on the Bravo cable network on June 1, 2005. The eight-part documentary series follows the lives of several parents and their child athletes, focusing on how they "struggle to excel in the highly stressful, competitive, "win at all costs" world of sports."

The show premiered following the success of another similar reality series entitled Showbiz Moms & Dads and Showdog Moms & Dads.

Roger Catlin of the Hartford Courant criticized the show by saying that it was "all presented without experts stepping in to say how involved parents should be in their children's sports dreams. Instead, it's pure voyeurism."
