= Jerry Nachman =

American journalist

Jerome A. "Jerry" Nachman (February 24, 1946 – January 19, 2004) was the editor-in-chief and vice president of MSNBC cable news network., and former editor of the New York Post.

== Early years ==
Nachman was born in Red Hook, Brooklyn and raised in Pittsburgh, Pennsylvania. Nachman's parents got a divorce when he was a child so he moved in with his mother and stepfather in Pittsburgh. Nachman attended, but did not graduate from, Youngstown State University for seven years, not taking a single journalism class. He then worked a number of newspaper jobs before moving into broadcasting.

== Biography ==
Nachman was editor-in-chief of the New York Post from 1989 to 1992, following a stint as a police reporter and political commentator at the Post. Prior to that, he served as news director of New York's NBC station, WNBC-TV, and as Vice President of New York's CBS flagship station, WCBS-TV. He served as the general manager of WRC radio and local television stations in Washington, D.C. Nachman also wrote scripts for television programs and produced the late-night, half-hour political talk show Politically Incorrect hosted by Bill Maher during the 2000 elections.

== Family ==
Nachman was married to Nancy Cook, but the marriage ended in divorce. His brother's name is Larry and he lived in Staten Island.

== Awards and honors ==
Nachman was a Peabody Award, Edward R. Murrow Award, and Emmy Award winner and twice served as a Pulitzer Prize juror.

== Death ==
Nachman died of cancer in 2004 at his home in Hoboken, New Jersey at the age of 57.
