= KBBA-LP =

Television station in Lake Havasu City, Arizona (2002–2005)

- Lake Havasu City, Arizona; United States
- Channels: Analog: 10 (VHF)

Programming
- Affiliations: City Cam

Ownership
- Owner: Smoke and Mirrors LLC

History
- Founded: August 7, 2002
- First air date: August 2005
- Former call signs: K10OS (CP only)

Technical information
- ERP: 3 kW
- HAAT: 265 m (869 ft)

KBBA-LP (channel 10) was a low-power television station in Lake Havasu City, Arizona, United States, which broadcast from a transmitter site about five miles (8 km) north of the city. The station provided visitors and residents with a continuous video feed from a camera looking over the Lake Havasu City area, as seen from the broadcast site.

== History ==
The original construction permit for K10OS in Lake Havasu City was granted on August 7, 2002. The permit's original owner was Powell Meredith Communications Company (no relation to Meredith Corporation), who owned two television stations in Yuma (KYUM-LP and KBFY-LP) which aired religious programming. The station took the call letters KBBA-LP in October 2003.

In March 2005, Powell Meredith sold most of their properties. The construction permit for KBBA-LP, along with a permit for K16GB in Kingman, were sold to Smoke and Mirrors LLC of Lake Havasu City. Smoke and Mirrors LLC is a regional broadcaster that also owns several FM properties in Mohave County. KBBA-LP went on the air in August 2005 and was licensed the following month.

In January 2010, KBBA ceased broadcasting. Its license was canceled in January 2011.
