= Curious Buddies =

- Genre: Early childhood series
- Created by: David Rudman; Todd Hannert; Adam Rudman
- Written by: Adam Rudman; Rachel Barr
- Directed by: David Rudman
- Narrated by: Cathy Richardson
- Theme music composer: Third Wave Productions
- Country of origin: United States
- Original language: English
- No. of seasons: 1
- No. of episodes: 9 (2 unreleased)

Production
- Executive producers: David Rudman; Todd Hannert; Adam Rudman
- Running time: 30 minutes
- Production company: Spiffy Pictures

Original release
- Release: August 31, 2004 – April 12, 2005

Related
- Jack's Big Music Show

Curious Buddies is a series of direct-to-video specials narrated by Cathy Richardson. It was produced by Spiffy Pictures in association with Nick Jr., and released across seven videos from August 31, 2004 to April 12, 2005, by Paramount Home Entertainment.

The series is aimed at babies and toddlers. It was made to compete with the Baby Einstein line. Every video was written with the supervision of developmental psychologist Rachel Barr and features a voiceover from Barr. The main characters are five animal puppets that were built by Rollie Krewson (known for her work with The Muppets).

One of the videos, "Helping at Home", was the recipient of a Spring 2005 Parents' Choice Award.

== Summary ==
Dog, Cat, Bear, Pig and Elephant are the Curious Buddies, a group of five animal puppets who have fun exploring the world around them. Every episode features real-life kids helping the puppets and original music clips.

According to a New York Post article, Curious Buddies was designed as an alternative to the successful Baby Einstein series. To differentiate itself, Curious Buddies features a pop song soundtrack (instead of the classical music found in Baby Einstein) and videos of real-life situations rather than indoor close-ups of toys.

== Episodes ==
Nine episodes were made.

No.	Title	Original release date
1	"Look and Listen at the Park"	August 31, 2004
The Curious Buddies go to the park, where they play peekaboo, bounce a ball and smell flowers. Songs: "Look and Listen", "It's a Ball!", "Tickle Me, Tickle You", "If You're Happy and You Know It", "Up and Down", "Peekaboo", "Flower Song", "Picnic"
2	"Exploring at the Beach"	August 31, 2004
The Curious Buddies go to the beach, where they listen to the waves and discover sea creatures while playing in the sand. Songs: "Let's Go to the Beach", "I Like Sand", "The Water Song", "Have You Ever Seen a Fishy?", "Walking on the Beach"
3	"Helping at Home"	August 31, 2004
The Curious Buddies help a family with chores. Songs: "I Can Help You", "Fruit Salad", "In and Out (Washing the Dog)", "My Baby Brother", "I Can Help You Too"
4	"Let's Go to the Farm!"	April 12, 2005
The Curious Buddies visit a farm, where they go on a hayride and meet the different animals. Songs: "Cows and Chickens and Pigs", "Curious Buddies Had a Farm", "Quack Quack Waddle Waddle", "Curious Buddies Square Dance", "I Love You", "On a Farm"
5	"Let's Build!"	April 12, 2005
The Curious Buddies watch construction vehicles in action and build their own buildings out of blocks. Songs: "Build it Up", "My Excavator", "Try Try Again", "Kids and Tools Instrumental", "Every Dog Needs a House"
6	"Let's Move!"	April 12, 2005
The Curious Buddies discover different forms of music and dance. Songs: "I Like the Way You Move", "Head, Shoulders, Knees and Toes", "Curious Buddies Move Along Song", "Shake-a-Rama Go Go Go", "Time to Get Loose", "Ring Around the Rosie", "I Still Like the Way You Move"
7	"Let's Make Music!"	April 12, 2005
The Curious Buddies experiment with different instruments and discover how to make music. Songs: "Let's Make Music!", "Twinkle Twinkle", "Mary Had a Little Lamb", "Musical Birds", "Bang, Blow, Strum"
8	"I Can Do It!"	Unreleased
This episode did not get a DVD release, but it was listed on the Spiffy Pictures website.
9	"It's Story Time!"	Unreleased
This episode did not get a DVD release, but it was listed on the Spiffy Pictures website.
