= CosmoGirl =

American magazine (1999–2008)

- Vanessa Hudgens on the cover of the August 2008 issue
- Editor-in-Chief: Susan Schulz
- Categories: Fashion
- Frequency: Monthly
- Founded: 1999
- Final issue: December 2008/January 2009
- Company: Hearst Corporation
- Country: United States
- Based in: New York City
- Language: English
- Website: cosmogirl.com

CosmoGirl, also stylized as COSMOgirl!, was an American magazine based in New York City, published from 1999 until 2008. The teenage spin-off of Cosmopolitan magazine, it targeted teenage girls and featured fashion and celebrities. It was published ten times a year and reached approximately eight million readers before folding. The last issue was released in December 2008; thereafter, subscribers received issues of fellow Hearst publication Seventeen.

The magazine was founded by Atoosa Rubenstein, who was asked to create a mock issue. She repeatedly scrawled the word "Girl!" in bed using fuchsia lipstick for use on the magazine cover. When she and her husband woke up, they were covered in lipstick.

Ann Shoket was the executive editor before leaving the magazine to replace Atoosa Rubenstein as the editor-in-chief of fellow Hearst magazine, Seventeen. The last editor-in-chief was Susan Schulz, who was reassigned to special projects at Hearst Magazines.

After the final issue, CosmoGirl initially continued online, similar to Elle Girl, of which the last printed issue appeared in June 2006. In late June/early July 2010, the website was merged with that of Seventeen.

== Content ==
Inside each issue of CosmoGirl, there was an interview and photo shoot with a celebrity, a beauty section featuring hair, skin, and makeup tips and trends, a fashion section highlighting various spreads of trends and clothes, and the Stars section which included articles on celebrities other than those featured on the cover. A monthly free calendar allowed readers to win various prizes by typing in a code to enter for a chance to win a prize on the magazine's website.

A section introduced in March 2008 named JSYK (Just So You Know) contained advice and stories of how readers fell in love, and a shocking real-life story. There were also embarrassing anecdotes, and a manga comic featuring a character named CG. The magazine's content was rounded out with the Body & Soul section, which covered sexual health, mental health, fitness, and nutrition.

== Project 2024 ==
Project 2024 was created in 2002. It was named 2024 because that was when the youngest readers would be thirty-five years old, old enough to run for President of the United States. Project 2024 was about helping young girls realize their dreams and has been supported by Senator Hillary Clinton, fashion designer Michael Kors, music mogul Sean "Diddy" Combs, and MySpace creator Tom Anderson.

== Editions in other languages ==
There have also been editions of the magazine in other countries, including the UK, the Netherlands, the Czech Republic, Turkey, China, Hong Kong and Indonesia, all written in the country's native language. (See the External links section.)

The UK CosmoGirl closed in June 2007. The magazine was considered unsustainable, since many adolescent girls had migrated to the internet or to other magazines targeted at an older age group.

The last Indonesian issue was published in September 2017. Its website remained online, but was no longer updated. Since November 2020, it is an unrelated aggregator website.

In the Netherlands, the last Dutch CosmoGirl was released in June 2021. Its publisher, Audax Groep, considered it no longer financially viable.
