= Roger Erickson (photographer) =

American photographer

Roger Erickson Boady (born December 7, 1964, in Washington, D.C.) Better known as Roger Erickson, is an American author, filmmaker and photographer. He is the first African American to photograph a cover of Vogue magazine featuring Paulina Rubio on the March 2003 cover of Vogue en español and Lily Aldridge on the August 2003 cover of Vogue México y Latinoamérica.

== History ==
Roger Erickson is an Oakland, California native. After college he relocated to London to embark on a career in editorial photography.

== Career ==
His early breakthrough came in 1990 with commissioned assignments featuring Motörhead, Neil Young and Crazy Horse for Select Magazine (written by David Cavanagh, November 1990). In 1991, he relocated to London, where he began his career photographing musicians. In 2003 he became the first African American to photograph a cover of Vogue magazine featuring Paulina Rubio on the March cover of Vogue en español, and Lily Aldridge on the August cover of Vogue México y Latinoamérica. In 2017, Roger Erickson photographed his third portfolio issue of Out100 for Out Magazine. His images have been published in Vogue México y Latinoamérica, Harper's Bazaar (UK), ELLE (France), GQ (US), Entertainment Weekly, Out Magazine, Flaunt Magazine, Q Magazine, ESPN Magazine, The Source Magazine, Ebony Magazine, and The Advocate He has photographed advertising for Cartier (jeweler), Hugo Boss, H&M, GQ, Lexus, Mercedes-Benz, Disney+, Paramount+ and Netflix.

Over the course of his career, Roger Erickson has photographed many celebrities, musicians and athletes. Among them are Mark Wahlberg, Chris Evans, Eminem, Taraji P. Henson, Juliette Lewis, Jared Leto, Regina King, Billy Bob Thornton, Samuel Jackson, Gillian Anderson, Elizabeth Banks, Kristen Bell, Neil Young, Wanda Sykes, Keke Palmer Usher, Chaka Khan, Hiroyuki Sanada, Colman Domingo, Ozzy Osbourne, Shaun White, Chris Paul, Zang Ziyi, 50 Cent, Ray Liotta, Ian McShane, Edward Albee, Sherry Vine, Ja Rule, Floyd Mayweather Jr., Greg Louganis, Billie Jean King, Sugar Ray Leonard, Georges St. Pierre, Snoop Dogg, Dr. Dre, Udo Kier, Telfar, Isabella Blow, Jeremy Scott, Dean and Dan Caten, Tippi Hedren, Usher (musician), J Dilla, Norman Reedus, BeBe Zahara Benet, Tracee Ellis Ross, Juliette Lewis, Ray Liotta, Indya Moore, Lil' Kim, Mark Ronson, Zachary Quinto, Joan Jett, Bianca Del Rio, Phyllis Diller, Evan Rachel Wood, Ice Cube, John Waters, Jonathan Groff, Ryan Reynolds, Chase Infiniti, Olivia Rodrigo, Tori Spelling, Shailene Woodley, Sterling K. Brown, Eiza Gonzalez, Lena Waithe, Eve (rapper), Jeremy Pope, Lady Bunny, Outkast and LL Cool J.

From 2025 through 2026 Roger Erickson served on the Storytelling Advisory Council at The American LGBTQ+ Museum in New York City. His work advances the museum’s mission to create inclusive and representative exhibitions through interpretive planning, object research, and concept design.

== Visual Discography ==
His photographs in music include album packaging artwork for:

- LL Cool J: 10 (LL Cool J album) 10 (LL Cool J album), The DEFinition, All World 2, Luv U Better, Hush (LL Cool J song) Hush (LL Cool J song), Paradise (LL Cool J song) Paradise (LL Cool J song).
- Joan Jett: Unvarnished, ChangeUp.
- Lil' Kim: The Naked Truth (Lil' Kim album) The Naked Truth (Lil' Kim album), Lighters Up (Lil' Kim song) Lighters Up (Lil' Kim song), Download.
- J Dilla: The Diary (J Dilla album) The Diary (J Dilla album).
- Musiq Soulchild: Soulstar (album) Soulstar (album), Best of Musiq Soulchild.
- Brandy Norwood: Afrodisiac (Brandy album) Afrodisiac (Brandy album), Afrodisiac (song), The Best of Brandy.
- Ja Rule: R.U.L.E., Wonderful (Ja Rule song) Wonderful (Ja Rule song), Caught Up (Ja Rule song) Caught Up (Ja Rule song), Icon (Ja Rule album).
- Too Short: Blow the Whistle (album) Blow the Whistle (album), Blow the Whistle (song) Blow the Whistle (song).
- Danity Kane: Welcome to the Dollhouse (album) Welcome to the Dollhouse (album).
- Chingy: Hate It or Love It (album) Hate It or Love It (album), Fly Like Me.
- Trina: Amazin' (Trina album) Amazin' (Trina album), My Bitches.
- Foxy Brown (rapper): We Don't Surrender, When the Lights Go Out (song).
- Joe Budden: Joe Budden (album).
- Keke Palmer: So Uncool, Super Jerkin'.
- Jadakiss: Kiss of Death (Jadakiss album) Kiss of Death (Jadakiss album).
- Jim Jones (rapper): Hustler's P.O.M.E.
- One Twelve (112): Pleasure & Pain (112 album) Pleasure & Pain (112 album).
- LSG (band): LSG2.
- Triple C's: Custom Cars & Cycles Custom Cars & Cycles.
- Karen Clark Sheard: The Heavens Are Telling.
- Joey Montana: Unico.
- Baby Bash: Cyclone (Baby Bash album) Cyclone (Baby Bash album).
- Lil' Zane: The Big Zane Theory.
- Jonn Hart: Who Booty (remix).
- Trick Trick: The People vs.
- Lyfe Jennings: Lyfe Change.

== Notable Exhibition ==
In 2015, Meg Shiffler, Gallery Director of the San Francisco Arts Commission and Galleries, curated Roger Erickson's photographic series, Outspoken: Portraits of LGBTQ Luminaries for a solo exhibition in San Francisco City Hall from June 9 to October 16. The exhibition coincided with the U.S. Supreme Court decision on the legalization of same sex marriage (Obergefell v. Hodges).

== Film Documentary ==
Roger Erickson wrote and directed "I Am...", a poignant two part, short documentary that examines what it means to be Out, as told by influential voices from music, social activism, the military, politics, and entertainment. Revealing personal journeys of identity, courage, and pride. Film screenings in 2018, Atlanta Underground Film Festival, the 29th Annual Tampa International Gay and Lesbian Film Festival, and Q Fest: San Antonio LGBT International Film Festival.

== Published Book ==
- Roger Erickson FLOSS (Photographer) : published (2024) by Goff Books/ ORO Editions.

FLOSS comprises a collection of monographs showcasing retrospective photographs by Roger Erickson, highlighting Hip Hop and Rock'n Roll music from the 1990s. These uniquely stylized images explore the aspirational, unrestrained and often extravagant nature of artists during an era when Hip Hop culture burst into international prominence. Foreword by Salli Richardson-Whitfield

== Contributed Works ==
- Smithsonian Anthology of Hip-Hop and Rap (contributor): (2021)
- Def Jam Recordings: The First 25 Years of the Last Great Record Label (contributor): (2011) Rizzoli International Publications
- GOWEST! (profile, contributor and Interview): (2011) Daab Publishing
- Hip Hop: A Cultural Odyssey (contributor): (2011) Aria Multimedia Entertainment
- Indochine (contributor): (2009) Rizzoli International Publications
- More Body and Soul (contributor): (2005) Rizzoli International Publications
- Hip Hop Immortals-The Remix (contributor): (2003) Sock Bandit Publishing
- Hip Hop Immortals (contributor) : (2002) Sock Bandit Publishing

== Book Awards ==
Roger Erickson FLOSS (Author and Photographer) : published by Goff Books/ ORO Editions.

- Px3 Prix de la Photographie de Paris : Gold in Book Award (People, 2025),
- Communication Arts, Photography Annual 66 : Award of Excellence (Books, 2025),
- American Photography 41 Awards : (Books, 2025),
- International Photography Awards : 2nd Place (Book / Monographs, 2024),
- Tokyo International Foto Awards : Bronze Medal (Book / People, 2024),
