= 2003 Soul Train Music Awards =

Music awards ceremony in Pasadena, US

Soul Train Music Awards
- Date: March 1, 2003
- Location: Pasadena Civic Auditorium, Pasadena, California
- Country: United States
- Hosted by: Queen Latifah and Arsenio Hall
- First award: 1987

Highlights
- Most awards: Nelly, Musiq Soulchild, B2K and Ashanti (2)
- Website: soultrain.com

Television/radio coverage
- Network: BET

The 2003 Soul Train Music Awards were held on March 1, 2003, at the Pasadena Civic Auditorium in Pasadena, California. The show was co-hosted by Queen Latifah and Arsenio Hall.

== Special awards ==
=== Quincy Jones Award for Outstanding Career Achievements – Male ===
- LL Cool J

=== Quincy Jones Award for Outstanding Career Achievements – Female ===
- Mariah Carey

=== Sammy Davis, Jr. Award for "Entertainer of the Year" ===
- Nelly

== Winners and nominees ==
Winners are in bold text.

=== R&B/Soul or Rap Album of the Year ===
- **Nelly – Nellyville**
  - Ashanti – Ashanti
  - LL Cool J – 10
  - Nas – Stillmatic

=== Best R&B/Soul Album – Male ===
- **Musiq Soulchild – Juslisen**
  - Gerald Levert – The G Spot
  - Jaheim – Still Ghetto
  - Justin Timberlake – Justified

=== Best R&B/Soul Album – Female ===
- **Ashanti – Ashanti**
  - Amerie – All I Have
  - Mary J. Blige – No More Drama
  - Angie Stone – Mahogany Soul

=== Best R&B/Soul Album – Group, Band or Duo ===
- **B2K – B2K**
  - Boyz II Men – Full Circle
  - Floetry – Floetic
  - R. Kelly and Jay Z – Best of Both Worlds

=== Best R&B/Soul Single – Male ===
- **Musiq Soulchild – "Dontchange"**
  - Maxwell – "This Woman's Work"
  - Justin Timberlake – "Like I Love You"
  - Usher – "U Don't Have to Call"

=== Best R&B/Soul Single – Female ===
- **Ashanti – "Foolish"**
  - Amerie – "Why Don't We Fall in Love"
  - Kelly Rowland - Stole
  - India.Arie – "Little Things"

=== Best R&B/Soul Single – Group, Band or Duo ===
- **B2K (featuring P. Diddy) – "Bump, Bump, Bump"**
  - Dru Hill – "I Should Be..."
  - Floetry – "Floetic"
  - TLC – "Girl Talk"

=== The Michel Jackson Award for Best R&B/Soul or Rap Music Video ===
- **Missy Elliott – "Work It"**
  - 50 Cent – "Wanksta"
  - Nelly (featuring Kelly Rowland) – "Dilemma"
  - Busta Rhymes (featuring P. Diddy and Pharrell) – "Pass the Courvoisier, Part II"

=== Best R&B/Soul or Rap New Artist ===
- **Amerie**
  - Heather Headley
  - Nappy Roots
  - Tweet

=== Best Gospel Album ===
- **Kirk Franklin – The Rebirth of Kirk Franklin**
  - The Canton Spirituals – Walking By Faith
  - Donald Lawrence and The Tri City Singers – Go Get Your Life Back
  - Hezekiah Walker and the Love Fellowship Crusade Choir – Family Affair II: Live at Radio City Music Hall

== Performers ==
- Mariah Carey – "My Saving Grace"
- LL Cool J – "Luv U Better"
- Amerie – "Talkin' to Me"
- Nelly and Kelly Rowland featuring St. Lunatics – "Dilemma"
- Musiq Soulchild – "Dontchange"
- Dru Hill – "I Love You"
- India.Arie – "The Truth"
- Justin Timberlake – "Rock Your Body" / "Like I Love You"
- Gerald Levert
- Lil' Kim featuring Mr. Cheeks – "The Jump Off"

== Presenters ==
- Orlando Jones and Paula Abdul - Presented Best R&B Soul/Rap New Artist
- Chris Rock - Presented Sammy Davis Jr. Award For Entertainer of the Year
- Randy Jackson and Tamyra Gray - Presented Best R&B Soul Single Group, Band, or Duo
- Hezekiah Walker, Nivea, and Tweet - Presented Best R&B Soul Album Male
- Kevin Eubanks and Shaun Robinson - Presented Michael Jackson Award For Best R&B Soul/Rap Music Video
- Kelly Price, Tyrese, and Maria Menounos - Presented Best R&B Soul Single Female
- Jennifer Lopez - Presented Quincy Jones Award For Outstanding Career Achievement Male
- Angie Stone, Heather Headley, and Wayne Brady - Presented Best Gospel Album
- Jon Kelley and 3LW - Presented Best R&B Soul Single Male
- Boyz II Men and Nappy Roots - Presented R&B Soul/Rap Album of the Year
- Babyface - Presented Quincy Jones Award For Outstanding Career Achievement Female
- Derek Luke, Natashia Williams, and MC Lyte - Presented Best R&B Soul Album Group, Band, or Duo
- Donald Lawrence, Missy Elliott, and Ginuwine Presented Best R&B Soul Album Female
