= Changes (Keni Burke album) =

Studio album by Keni Burke
- Released: April 1982
- Recorded: 1981–1982
- Studio: Sigma Sound, Philadelphia, Pennsylvania
- Genre: Soul; Funk
- Label: RCA
- Producer: Keni Burke

Keni Burke chronology
You're the Best (1981)	Changes (1982)	Nothin' But Love (1998)

Singles from Changes
- 1. "Risin' to the Top" Released: 1982

Professional ratings
Review scores
Source	Rating
AllMusic	3/5 stars

Changes is the third solo album by former Five Stairsteps member Keni Burke. It was released in 1982 on RCA Records and includes the often sampled track "Risin' to the Top"

== Original LP track listing ==
All tracks are written by Keni Burke, except where noted.

Side one
No.	Title	Co-writer(s)	Length
1.	"Shakin'"	Norma Jean Wright	6:02
2.	"Hang Tight"	Allan Felder	4:12
3.	"Can't Get Enough (Do It All Night)"	Felder, Dean Gant	4:51
4.	"Who Do You Love"	Felder	5:29

Side two
No.	Title	Co-writer(s)	Length
1.	"Changes"		4:50
2.	"One Minute More"	Linda Creed	4:48
3.	"Risin' to the Top"	Felder, Norma Jean Wright	5:16
4.	"All Night"	Felder, Gant	4:36

Note: Some German editions also include "Let Somebody Love You" and "You're the Best" from his previous album You're the Best

== Personnel ==
- Keni Burke – Bass, rhythm guitar, synthesizer (Prophet 5), percussion, wurlitzer, vocals, backing vocals
- Steve Ferrone – Drums
- Ed "Tree" Moore – Lead guitar, rhythm guitar
- Leonard "Dockta" Gibbs, Jr. – Percussion
- Vincent Montana Jr. – Vibraphone
- Don Myrick, Louis Satterfield, Michael Harris, Rahmlee Lee Davis – Horns
- "Sir" Dean Gant – Synthesizer (Moog Bass), piano (Fender Rhodes)
- Ed Walsh – Vocoder (Obx), synthesizer (Prophet 5)
- Barbara Ingram, Carla Benson, Evette L. Benton, Tawatha Agee, Day Askey Burke, Terri Askey – Backing vocals
- Leon "Ndugu" Chancler – Drums, percussion on "Let Somebody Love You"
- Michael Thompson – Guitar on "You're the Best"
- Joe Tarsia – Recording and mixing
- Edward "Chappie" Johnson – Executive producer

== Charts ==
=== Singles ===
Year	Single	Chart positions
Year	Single	US R&B
1982	"Risin' to the Top"	63

== Samples ==
- Doug E. Fresh sampled "Risin' to the Top" on his song "Keep Risin' to the Top" on his album The World's Greatest Entertainer in 1988.
- Big Daddy Kane sampled "Risin' to the Top" on his song "Smooth Operator" on his album It's a Big Daddy Thing in 1989.
- LL Cool J sampled "Risin' to the Top" on his song "Around the Way Girl" on his album Mama Said Knock You Out in 1990 and would later sample it for "Paradise" on his album 10
- Mary J. Blige sampled "Risin' to the Top" on her song "Love No Limit" on her album What's the 411? Remix in 1993.
- Pete Rock & CL Smooth sampled "Risin' to the Top" on their song "Take You There" on their album The Main Ingredient in 1994.
- O.C. sampled "Risin' to the Top" on his song "Born 2 Live" on his album Word...Life in 1994.
