= Keni Burke (album) =

Studio album by Keni Burke
- Released: 16 August 1977
- Recorded: 1977
- Studio: Sound Factory West, Los Angeles, CA; Total Experience Recording Studios, Hollywood, California
- Genre: Soul
- Length: 34:49
- Label: Dark Horse
- Producer: Keni Burke

Keni Burke chronology
Keni Burke (1977)	You're the Best (1981)

Singles from Keni Burke
- 1. "Shuffle" Released: 10 October 1977; 2. "Day" Released: January 1978

Keni Burke is the debut solo album by former Five Stairsteps member Keni Burke. Released in 1977, on George Harrison's Dark Horse Records label. "Shuffle" and "Day", were released as singles in the US, with "From Me to You" and "Keep On Singing" as B-sides, respectively. The sleeve states: "Special thanks to George Harrison and Dennis Morgan for making this album possible."

== Track listing ==
Side one

1. "Keep on Singing" (Keni Burke, Day Askey Burke) – 4:40
2. "You Are All Mine" (K. Burke, D. A. Burke)– 3:02
3. "Day" (K. Burke) – 2:48
4. "It's the Last Time" (K. Burke, D. A. Burke)– 4:06
5. "Shuffle" (K. Burke, D. A. Burke) – 3:39

Side two

6. "Give All You Can Give" (K. Burke, Ronnie Vann) – 4:00
7. "Tell Me That You Love Me" (K. Burke, Vann) – 4:03
8. "Something New (Like a Sweet Melody)" (K. Burke, Vann) – 4:23
9. "From Me to You" (K. Burke) – 4:08

== Personnel ==
- Keni Burke - vocals, bass, Fender Rhodes, guitar, Mini Moog, backing vocals
- Johnny McGhee, John McLain - guitar
- Ronnie Vann - rhythm guitar
- Don Farrell, Jim Studer, Dean Gant, Sonny Burke - keyboards
- Alvin Taylor, Teddy Sparks - drums
- Mayuto Correa, James "Alibe" Sledge, Babatunde Olatunji - percussion
- Ernest J. Watts, George R. Bohanon, Oscar Brashear - horns
- Deidre "Day" Askey Burke, Ivory Stone, Ricky Williams - backing vocals
- Strings and horns arranged by Keni Burke and Gil Askey
