= Marc Dorsey =

American R&B singer

- Born: Marc-Dewaine Hample Dorsey; 1971 (age 54–55); Washington, D.C., U.S.
- Genres: R&B
- Years active: 1994–2002
- Labels: Jive Records

Marc-Dewaine Hample Dorsey (born 1971) is an American R&B singer. He is best known for his guest appearance on LL Cool J's 2002 single "Luv U Better", which peaked within the top five of the Billboard Hot 100 and was nominated for Best Rap/Sung Collaboration at 46th Annual Grammy Awards. That same year, he guest appeared alongside Pharrell Williams on Jay-Z's song "A Ballad for the Fallen Soldier". Both songs were produced by the Neptunes.

Dorsey signed with Jive Records to release his only studio album, Crave in the summer of 1999, which narrowly entered the Top R&B/Hip-Hop Albums chart.

== Career ==
In 1994, Dorsey released his first single, a cover version of The Stylistics' "People Make the World Go Round", for Spike Lee's film Crooklyn. The track appeared as the film's opening song and also was featured in its soundtrack album. Dorsey contributed on the soundtracks to David C. Johnson's 1994 film Drop Squad and Spike Lee's follow-up Clockers (1995).

He wrote several jingles for commercials, including spots for Coca-Cola, Oreos and the United States Army.

On August 10, 1999, Marc Dorsey released his debut studio album Crave through Jive Records. The album was produced by Timmy Allen, Larry Campbell and Manuel Seal, and spawned three charted singles: "If You Really Want to Know", "Crave" and "All I Do".

In 2002, he was the featured vocalist on the LL Cool J's single "Luv U Better". The song reached #4 on the Billboard Hot 100 chart, and was nominated for the Grammy Award for Best Rap/Sung Collaboration in 2004, losing to Beyoncé & Jay-Z's "Crazy in Love".

Marc Dorsey cited Stevie Wonder as his influence.

== Discography ==
Studio albums

Title	Album details	Peak chart positions
Title	Album details	Top R&B/Hip-Hop Albums
Crave	Released: August 10, 1999; Label: Jive; Format: CD, cassette, LP	94

Charted singles

Title	Release year	Peak chart positions				Album
Title	Release year	US R&B	US R&B Airplay	US R&B Adult	UK	Album
"People Make the World Go Round"	1994	65	66	—	—	Music from the Motion Picture Crooklyn
"If You Really Wanna Know"	1999	56	61	39	58	Crave
"Crave"	1999	—	—	31	89	Crave and Music from and Inspired by the Motion Picture The Wood
"All I Do"	2000	—	—	—	78	Crave
"—" denotes a recording that did not chart.

Guest appearances

Title	Year	Other artist(s)	Album
"Keep That Same Old Feeling"	1994	Michael Bearden, Najee	Spike Lee Presents Drop Squad - Come Back Brother
"Forever Yours"	1994	—N/a	Spike Lee Presents Drop Squad - Come Back Brother
"My Cherie Amour"	1995	Tony Thompson	Sexsational
"Come Over"	1995	Tony Thompson	Sexsational
"People in Search of a Life"	1995	—N/a	Clockers (Original Motion Picture Soundtrack)
"Changes"	1995	—N/a	Clockers (Original Motion Picture Soundtrack)
"I Can't Make a Mistake"	1998	MC Lyte	Seven & Seven
"Ghetto Children"	1999	Kelis	Kaleidoscope
"Luv U Better"	2002	LL Cool J	10
"A Ballad for the Fallen Soldier"	2002	Jay-Z	The Blueprint²: The Gift & the Curse

== Awards and nominations ==
Year	Nominee / work	Award	Result
2002	"Luv U Better"	Grammy Award for Best Rap/Sung Collaboration	Nominated
