= All I Have =

All I Have may refer to:

- All I Have (album), by Amerie, or the title song, 2002
- "All I Have" (song), by Jennifer Lopez featuring LL Cool J, 2002
- "All I Have", a song by the Moments, 1970
- "All I Have", a song by NF from Mansion, 2015
- All I Have, a 2006 Nigerian film starring Rita Dominic with Mike Ezuruonye

== See also ==
- Jennifer Lopez: All I Have, a 2016–2018 concert residency in Las Vegas, Nevada, US
