= Roger Erickson =

Roger Erickson may refer to:

- Roger Erickson (baseball) (born 1956), American baseball pitcher
- Roger Erickson (photographer), American photographer
- Roger Erickson (politician) (born 1953), Minnesota politician
