= Headsprung =

Single by LL Cool J featuring Timbaland

from the album The DEFinition
- B-side: "Feel the Beat"
- Released: June 7, 2004
- Studio: The Hit Factory Criteria (Miami, Florida)
- Genre: Hip-hop
- Length: 4:27
- Label: Def Jam
- Songwriters: James Todd Smith; Timothy Mosley
- Producer: Timbaland

LL Cool J singles chronology
"Amazin'" (2003)	"Headsprung" (2004)	"Hush" (2004)

Timbaland singles chronology
"Deliverance" (2003)	"Headsprung" (2004)	"Are You Feelin' Me?" (2005)

"Headsprung" is a song by American hip-hop artist LL Cool J. Co-written and produced by Timbaland, it was released on June 7, 2004, as the lead single from his eleventh album, The DEFinition (2004). A success on the charts, it peaked at number 16 on the US Billboard Hot 100, number four on the Hot Rap Songs chart, and number seven on the Hot R&B/Hip-Hop Songs chart.

== Background ==
"Headsprung" was written by LL Cool J along with its producer Timbaland. LL Cool J has described the song as a "prime example of [him] caring more about the feel and the vibe and the energy than the substance." He further commented in an 2012 interview with Entertainment Weekly: "I didn’t say anything particularly special, I just love the flow and the rhythm of it. [1993’s] "Pink Cookies in a Plastic Bag Getting Crushed by Buildings" is like that. Ask the Beatles what the "Yellow Submarine" is. Sometimes as artists, we just do crazy stuff." In September 2019, he addressed a long‑running debate among fans about the song's lyrics. Noting that numerous lyric websites had incorrectly transcribed the song's intro, he took to Twitter to provide the definitive version. LL posted the correct lyrics line by line and responded to fans who were debating the often‑misheard line "Big Elly."

== Critical reception ==
AllMusic's David Jeffries praised the song as a change from the slow jams of LL's 10, highlighting the Southern production and New York-style vocal delivery as a great merger, concluding that it was "simple, club, crunk, and not the kind of revolution Timbaland or LL Cool J can crank out when on fire, but solid enough to put the rapper back on top of the beatbox." Rashaun Hall of Billboard was mixed on the song, commending LL's attempt to adapt to the crunk style but feeling the hook was "derivative" and that Timbaland's production overpowered him, concluding that "For better or for worse, "Headsprung" marks LL Cool J's continued evolution as an artist." Nick Southall of Stylus Magazine said that it was "a hit but not a monster".

== Music video ==
A music video for "Headsprung" was directed Eric Williams and Randy Marshall under their collaborative moniker Fat Cats. with production overseen by Edy Enriquez.

== Cover versions ==
Keri Hilson did a cover of this song featuring Justin Timberlake; the cover was used as a remix with LL Cool J's 1st verse. A version of this song, however, without Timberlake, has appeared, renamed, as the title track for Hilson's 2009 compilation album, Ms. Keri.

== Track listings ==
US 12" (Promo)

1. "Headsprung" (Radio Edit) – 3:55
2. "Headsprung" (Instrumental) – 4:27
3. "Feel the Beat" (Radio Edit) – 3:48
4. "Feel the Beat" (Instrumental) – 4:20

US CD (Promo)

1. "Headsprung" (Radio) – 3:58
2. "Headsprung" (Instrumental) – 4:31
3. "Call Out" – 0:11

Europe CD (Promo)

1. "Headsprung" (Radio Edit) – 3:55

UK CD

1. "Headsprung" (Album Version) – 4:27
2. "Feel the Beat" (Album Version) – 4:17

== Credits and personnel ==
Credits lifted from the liner notes of The DEFinition.

- Demacio Castellon – recording engineer
- Jimmy Douglass – mixing engineer
- LL Cool J – writer
- Timbaland – producer, writer

== Charts ==
=== Weekly charts ===
Weekly chart performance for "Headsprung"
Chart (2004)	Peak position
Germany (GfK)	80
Scotland Singles (OCC)	43
Switzerland (Schweizer Hitparade)	20
UK Hip Hop/R&B (OCC)	3
UK Singles (OCC)	25
US Billboard Hot 100	16
US Hot R&B/Hip-Hop Songs (Billboard)	7
US Hot Rap Songs (Billboard)	4
US Rhythmic Airplay (Billboard)	6

=== Year-end charts ===
Year-end chart performance for "Headsprung"
Chart (2004)	Position
UK Urban (Music Week) "Headsprung" / "Feel the Beat"	28
US Billboard Hot 100	67
US Hot R&B/Hip-Hop Songs (Billboard)	39
US Hot Rap Songs (Billboard)	22

== Certifications ==
Certifications for "Headsprung"
Region	Certification	Certified units/sales
United States (RIAA)	Platinum	1,000,000^{‡}
^{‡} Sales+streaming figures based on certification alone.

== Release history ==
"Headsprung" release history
Region	Date	Format(s)	Label(s)	Ref.
United States	June 28, 2004	Rhythmic contemporary · urban contemporary radio	Roc-A-Fella, IDJMG	
