= The First Family of Soul: The Best of the Five Stairsteps =

Compilation album by Five Stairsteps
- Released: November 6, 2001
- Length: Various
- Label: Buddah
- Producer: Various

Five Stairsteps chronology
The Encore Collection: Their Greatest Hits (1998)	The First Family of Soul: The Best of the Five Stairsteps (2001)

The First Family of Soul: The Best of the Five Stairsteps is a compilation album released by Buddah Records on November 6, 2001, for the family musical group The Five Stairsteps.
