= You're the Best (album) =

Studio album by Keni Burke
- Released: 1981
- Genre: R&B
- Label: RCA
- Producer: Kenneth M. Burke

Keni Burke chronology
Keni Burke (1977)	You're the Best (1981)	Changes (1982)

You're the Best is the second studio album by American singer Keni Burke. It was released in 1981 on RCA Records.

== Track listing ==
1. "Let Somebody Love You" (Keni Burke) 5:07
2. "Gotta Find My Way Back in Your Heart" (Keni Burke, Bill Withers) 6:16
3. "Love Is the Answer" (Todd Rundgren) 5:35
4. "You're the Best" (Dean Gant, Dennis Burke, Keni Burke, Leon "Ndugu" Chancler) 4:15
5. "Paintings of Love" (Keni Burke) 2:42
6. "Night Riders" (Dennis Burke, George Johnson, Keni Burke) 5:08
7. "Never Stop Loving Me" (Keni Burke, Curtis Mayfield) 5:17

== Personnel ==
- Keni Burke – vocals, bass, guitar (tracks: 1, 2, 4–7), background vocals
- Dennis Burke (tracks: 1–3, 5–7), Michael Thompson (tracks: 3, 4) – guitar
- Dean Gant – piano (tracks: 1, 5, 6), keyboards
- Reginald "Sonny" Burke (tracks: 1, 6) – piano
- Leon "Ndugu" Chancler – drums
- Day Askey Burke, Terri Askey (tracks: 1, 5, 6) – background vocals
- Gil Askey (tracks: 1, 7), Wade Marcus (tracks: 2) – string and horn arrangements
- Edward "Chappie" Johnson – Executive Producer
