= I'm Coming Out =

1980 song recorded by Diana Ross

- One of side-A labels of US single

Single by Diana Ross

from the album Diana
- B-side: "Give Up"; "Friend to Friend"; "Never Say I Don't Love You"; "My Old Piano"
- Released: August 22, 1980
- Recorded: December 1979
- Studio: Power Station, New York City
- Genre: Disco; funk; soul
- Length: 5:24 (album version); 3:59 (radio edit)
- Label: Motown
- Songwriters: Bernard Edwards; Nile Rodgers
- Producers: Nile Rodgers; Bernard Edwards

Diana Ross singles chronology
"Upside Down" (1980)	"I'm Coming Out" (1980)	"My Old Piano" (1980)

Audio
- "I'm Coming Out" on YouTube

"I'm Coming Out" is a song recorded by American singer Diana Ross. It was written and produced by Chic members Bernard Edwards and Nile Rodgers, and released on August 22, 1980 by Motown, as the second single from Ross' self-titled eleventh album, Diana (1980). It peaked at number five on the U.S. Billboard Hot 100, number one on the Billboard Hot Disco Singles chart, number seven in France, number eight in Ireland, and number 13 on the UK Singles Chart. Since its release, "I'm Coming Out" has been regarded as an anthem for the LGBT community.

== Background ==
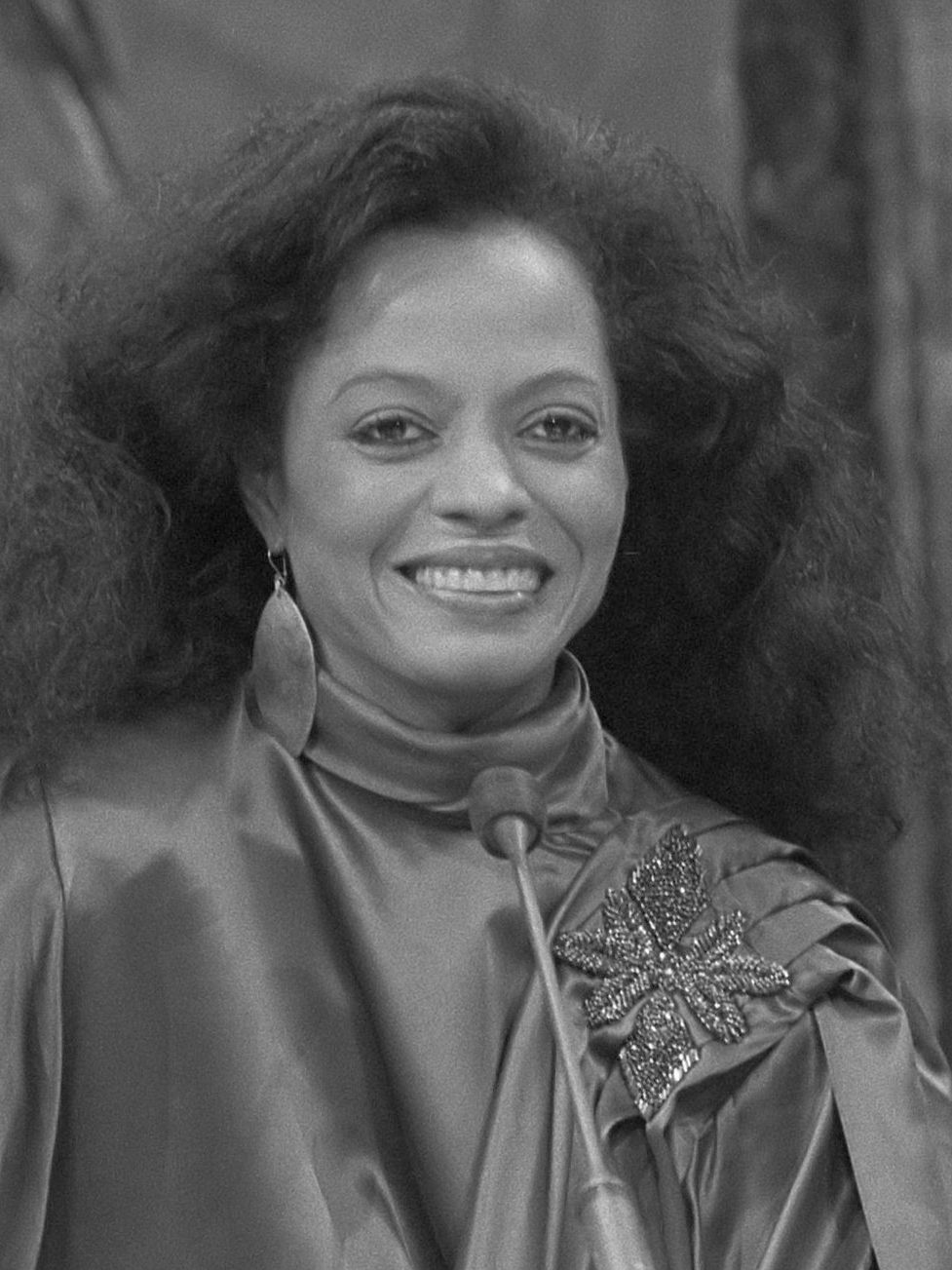
Diana Ross, 1981

In 1979, Ross commissioned Chic founders Nile Rodgers and Bernard Edwards to create material for a new album after taking her daughters to see the band in concert. In 2021, Nile Rodgers confirmed in a TikTok video that the song was inspired by seeing drag queens dressed as Diana Ross at a New York club, with Rodgers stating:

So the way that the song "I'm Coming Out" came to be was when we went to work for Diana Ross we wanted to write about things that were in her universe, so we went to her apartment and interviewed her for a couple of days. One particular night I went to a club, The Gilded Grape, and I happened to notice that there were at least 6 or 7 Diana Ross impersonators, so I went outside to call Bernard and said "you know, Diana Ross is revered by the gay community. If we wrote a song called "I'm Coming Out" for Diana Ross it would have the same power as James Brown's "Say It Loud – I'm Black and I'm Proud" and next day we met in the studio [...] and then from that we built the song.

The lyrics hold an additional meaning for Ross, as she was leaving Motown Records and "coming out" from under Berry Gordy's thumb. According to the BBC4 documentary How to Make It in the Music Business, Ross loved the record until she put it in front of Frankie Crocker, who pointed out that "I'm coming out" is what homosexual people use to announce their homosexuality, that listeners would think Ross herself was announcing she was gay, and that it would ruin her career. She allegedly ran back to the studio in tears and demanded to know why Rodgers and Edwards would write the song knowing that it would damage her career, but was later convinced that was not the case and decided to release the song.

== Legacy ==
The song was another hit from the album, peaking at number five on the US Billboard Hot 100 chart for three weeks in November 1980. It is also notable for being the first song usually performed at Ross' performances and concerts since 1980. In 2021, it was ranked No. 385 on Rolling Stone's "Top 500 Greatest Songs of All Time". In 2022, the magazine ranked it No. 45 in their list of the "200 Greatest Dance Songs of All Time". In 2025, Billboard magazine ranked it No. 3 in their list of "The 100 Greatest LGBTQ+ Anthems of All Time".

== LGBT significance ==
"I'm Coming Out" has been regarded as an anthem for the LGBT community. The phrase "coming out" to describe one's self-disclosure of sexual orientation or gender identity had been present in the LGBT subculture since the early 20th century. It has also been understood as "coming out of the closet" or coming out from hiding. The song is thus interpreted as a celebration of lesbian, gay, bisexual, or transgender identity and the encouragement of self-disclosure.

== Trombone solo ==
Rodgers convinced his neighbor, producer Meco Monardo, to contract the horns for the album in return for a commitment by Rodgers to co-produce Monardo's then-upcoming album of music from The Empire Strikes Back. Monardo, a former first-call session player who had a string of hits in the late 1970s with disco versions of film music, also played trombone on the album and is featured in a solo towards the end of "I'm Coming Out":

Nile recorded all the tracks and vocals and called me and my horn section for a 3-hour date. We had a great time, as the songs were fabulous—especially "Upside Down" and "I'm Coming Out". We sounded great—Nile was pleased and as I was packing up, he asked me to stay and play a jazz trombone solo on one of the tracks. I said, "Nile, there are a lot of hit records with jazz saxophone solos—even some with jazz trumpet solos, but not one with a trombone"!! He said. "That's exactly why I want you to do it"!!

Trombone solos have been rare on Top 40 songs in the post-big band era and especially so since the 1960s. Notable exceptions include brief solos by James Pankow on a handful of early Chicago hits and Clifford Adams' brief solo on Kool & the Gang's 1983 hit "Joanna".

Weeks went by when I heard through the grapevine that Diana Ross was incredibly unhappy with the album. She thought Nile and Bernard made her sound like Chic. She took the master tapes from Power Station and went to Motown in Detroit to remix the record. When it came out, her early interviews were very unenthusiastic about it and Nile and Bernard, her producers. Well, as we all know, this turned out to be her biggest-selling solo album ever. "Upside Down" was a monster Number-One single and "I'm Coming Out" was a top-ten single. It turned out that when the engineer at Motown saw the track listings of Meco 1–2–3–4, he just assumed that Track 1 was THE track and never listened to the others, and so that's what is on the record. So, I'm extremely proud to say that my solo is the only jazz trombone solo of a top-ten pop hit in the last 50 years! But – it wasn't my best – that, unfortunately lies in the vaults at Motown.

The dispute with Ross led to none of the musicians being credited on the album cover and also may have had a part in Rodgers backing out of his commitment to Monardo's Meco Plays Music from The Empire Strikes Back album. However, Rodgers and Monardo later mended their professional relationship and subsequent digital releases of the album credit Monardo and the other musicians. A 2003 two-disc release of the album included the Rodgers/Edwards mix originally rejected by Ross, as a bonus track.

== Music video ==
The accompanying music video for "I'm Coming Out" consists of Ross performing the song with studio musicians live in concert.

== Track listings ==
- US, UK, French, and West German 7-inch and 12-inch single

A. "I'm Coming Out"
B. "Give Up"

- Dutch 7-inch and 12-inch single

A. "I'm Coming Out"
B. "Never Say I Don't Love You"

- Swedish 7-inch single

A. "I'm Coming Out"
B. "My Old Piano"

== Charts ==
=== Weekly charts ===
Chart (1980)	Peak position
Australia (Kent Music Report)	40
Belgium (Ultratop 50 Flanders)	16
Luxembourg (Radio Luxembourg)	5
Netherlands (Dutch Top 40)	23
France (SNEP)	7
Ireland (IRMA)	8
UK Singles (OCC)	13
US Billboard Hot 100	5
US Hot Soul Singles (Billboard)	6
US Hot Disco Singles (Billboard)	1
US Cash Box Top 100	6

Chart (1994)	Peak position
UK Club Chart (Music Week)	41

=== Year-end charts ===
Chart (1980)	Position
US Cash Box Top 100	28

Chart (1981)	Position
US Billboard Hot 100	98

== Certifications ==
Region	Certification	Certified units/sales
Canada (Music Canada)	Platinum	150,000^{^}
Denmark (IFPI Danmark)	Gold	45,000^{‡}
New Zealand (RMNZ)	Platinum	30,000^{‡}
United Kingdom (BPI)	Platinum	600,000^{‡}
^{^} Shipments figures based on certification alone.^{‡} Sales+streaming figures based on certification alone.

== Amerie version ==
"I'm Coming Out"

Single by Amerie

from the album Maid in Manhattan: Music from the Motion Picture
- B-side: "Talkin' to Me"
- Released: April 7, 2002
- Recorded: 2002
- Length: 3:32
- Label: Columbia
- Songwriters: Bernard Edwards; Nile Rodgers
- Producers: Cory Rooney; Loren Dawson

Amerie singles chronology
"Talkin' to Me" (2002)	"I'm Coming Out" (2002)	"Paradise" (2003)

Music video
- Amerie – I'm Coming Out on YouTube

In 2002, American singer Amerie covered "I'm Coming Out" for the soundtrack to the film Maid in Manhattan. Her version was released as a single in select European countries and Australia. The final single version to be released was the Loren Dawson remix. The original single version (which is similar to the original) can be found on both CD singles and the original motion picture soundtrack to Maid in Manhattan. Ross' version appears on the film's soundtrack album as well.

=== Music video ===
A music video was produced to promote the single.

=== Track listings ===
- German CD single
1. "I'm Coming Out" (Loren Dawson Remix) – 3:49
2. "Talkin' to Me" (album version) – 4:00
3. "Talkin' to Me" (Trackmasters Remix) (featuring Foxy Brown) – 3:38
4. "Talkin’ to Me" (Mark Ronson Sunshine Remix) (no loop) – 3:09
5. "I'm Coming Out" (video)
- French CD single
1. "I'm Coming Out" (Loren Dawson Remix) – 3:49
2. "Talkin' to Me" (album version) – 4:00
- Australian CD single
1. "I'm Coming Out" (Loren Dawson Remix) – 3:49
2. "Talkin' to Me" (album version) – 4:00
3. "Talkin' to Me" (Trackmasters Remix) (featuring Foxy Brown) – 3:38

=== Charts ===
Chart (2003)	Peak position
Australia (ARIA)	66
Australian Urban (ARIA)	23
Netherlands (Dutch Top 40 Tipparade)	17
Netherlands (Single Top 100)	69
Romania (Romanian Top 100)	100

=== Release history ===
Region	Date	Format	Label	Ref.
Germany	April 7, 2003	CD single	Columbia	
France	April 15, 2003	CD single	Columbia	
Australia	April 18, 2003	CD single	Columbia	

== Other samples and covers ==
The distinctive sound of "I'm Coming Out" and its resulting popularity has led to Ross's single often being sampled, most notably by Stevie J, who sampled the song for rapper The Notorious B.I.G.'s 1997 song "Mo Money Mo Problems" with Mase, Sean "Diddy" Combs and Kelly Price. Ross and Combs performed "I'm Coming Out / Mo Money Mo Problems" in 2019 as a mashup at Ross's 75th birthday party at the Hollywood Palladium. In 1997, German comedian Hella von Sinnen sampled "I'm Coming Out" for her single "Mein Coming Out", using the term "coming out" in the context of coming out of the closet, or revealing one's homosexuality. In April 2014, Keyshia Cole and Australian rapper Iggy Azalea released a cover version of "I'm Coming Out", for The Other Woman movie soundtrack. In August 2014, singer Ariana Grande sampled the song for her song "Break Your Heart Right Back" (featuring Childish Gambino), from her second studio album My Everything (2014). Recording artist, Samantha Jade covered the song for her 2018 album, Best of My Love.
