= Hush (LL Cool J song) =

2004 single by LL Cool J

Single by LL Cool J featuring 7 Aurelius

from the album The DEFinition
- B-side: "Rub My Back"
- Released: September 7, 2004
- Length: 3:35
- Label: Def Jam
- Songwriters: James Todd Smith; 7 Aurelius; Paul Graham; Cornelius Mims; Paul Bushnell
- Producer: 7 Aurelius

LL Cool J singles chronology
"Headsprung" (2004)	"Hush" (2004)	"It's LL and Santana" (2006)

Music video
- "Hush" on YouTube

"Hush" is the second single from American rapper LL Cool J's tenth studio album, The DEFinition (2004). Produced by 7 Aurelius, who provides additional vocals, the song was released on September 7, 2004, by Def Jam Recordings. "Hush" charted at number 26 on the US Billboard Hot 100, number 11 on the Billboard Hot Rap Tracks chart, and number 14 on the Billboard Hot R&B/Hip-Hop Singles & Tracks chart. The single became a top-10 success in the United Kingdom, where it debuted and peaked at number three on the UK Singles Chart in February 2005.

== Background ==
"Hush" was written by LL Cool J along with 7 Aurelius, Paul Graham, Cornelius Mims, and Paul Bushnell for his tenth studio album, The DEFinition (2004), with Aurelius overseeing its production. In an interview with MTV News, LL Cool J commented on the song: "It's about how we go through problems and pain and drama, but if we stick together, no matter how rough it gets, we gonna get through. That could be a relationship, man and woman, that can be a crew, that can be a team, whatever. However you slice it, at the end of the day, when the drama happens — just hush. Be easy. Be still in the midst of the storm, and we'll figure out what we need to do."

== Commercial performance ==
In the United States, "Hush" reached number 26 on the US Billboard Hot 100. It also peaked at number 11 on the Billboard Hot Rap Tracks chart and number 14 on the Billboard Hot R&B/Hip-Hop Singles & Tracks chart. "Hush" was released to bigger commercial success in the United Kingdom, where it reached number three on the UK Singles Chart, becoming LL Cool J's highest-charting single since "Ain't Nobody" (1996). On October 24, 2025, nearly two decades after its release, the song was certified silver by the British Phonographic Industry (BPI). The song also reached the top 30 in Ireland, peaking at number 23 on the Irish Singles Chart, and became a top-10 on the Eurochart Hot 100.

== Music video ==
A music video for "Hush" was filmed on location in Queens, New York, and directed by Jessy Terrero. Shot in late September 2004, the video depicts LL Cool J returning to his old neighborhood with his partner, played by Dominican actress Dania Ramirez. Throughout the shoot, local residents gathered along Jamaica Avenue to watch and participate, with LL engaging directly with fans and encouraging community involvement. The concept centers on juxtaposing the artist's present success with nostalgic flashbacks, including appearances by his eldest son, Najee, who portrays a 17-year-old version of his father in the video's flashback sequences. LL Cool J elaborated on the video, while filming scenes in Queens: "It's about a guy who's made it, who's very, very successful. He decides to take his girl back to the 'hood where they first met, so they can appreciate and kinda reminisce about where they come from. I think you'll find that with people that make money, sometimes you gotta keep a bus pass in your wallet so you don't act too cute in a Benz. This [video] was my way of doing that. I wanted to bring it back home."

== Track listings ==
US 12-inch single

A1. "Hush" (radio)
A2. "Hush" (instrumental)
A3. "Hush" (a cappella)
B1. "Rub My Back" (radio)
B2. "Rub My Back" (instrumental)
B3. "Rub My Back" (a cappella)

UK CD1 and European CD single

1. "Hush" (radio edit) – 3:35
2. "The Truth" – 3:42

UK CD2

1. "Hush" (radio edit) – 3:35
2. "Luv U Better" – 4:49
3. "Hey Lover" – 4:48
4. "Hush" (video)

UK 12-inch single

A1. "Hush" (radio edit) – 3:35
A2. "The Truth" – 3:42
B1. "Luv U Better" – 4:48

== Charts ==
=== Weekly charts ===
Weekly chart performance for "Hush"
Chart (2004–2005)	Peak position
Canada CHR/Pop Top 30 (Radio & Records)	25
Europe (Eurochart Hot 100)	10
Ireland (IRMA)	23
Romania (Romanian Top 100)	52
Scottish Singles Sales (Official Charts)	11
UK Singles (Official Charts)	3
UK Hip Hop/R&B (Official Charts)	2
US Billboard Hot 100	26
US Hot R&B/Hip-Hop Songs (Billboard)	14
US Hot Rap Songs (Billboard)	11
US Pop Airplay (Billboard)	26

=== Year-end charts ===
2004 year-end chart performance for "Hush"
Chart (2004)	Position
US Hot R&B/Hip-Hop Singles & Tracks (Billboard)	88
US Rhythmic Top 40 (Billboard)	81

2005 year-end chart performance for "Hush"
Chart (2005)	Position
UK Singles (OCC)	83

== Certifications ==
Certifications for "Hush"
Region	Certification	Certified units/sales
United Kingdom (BPI)	Silver	200,000^{‡}
^{‡} Sales+streaming figures based on certification alone.

== Release history ==
Release dates and formats for "Hush"
Region	Date	Format(s)	Label(s)	Ref.
United States	September 7, 2004	Rhythmic contemporary; urban radio	Def Jam	
United States	October 4, 2004	Contemporary hit radio	Def Jam	
United Kingdom	February 14, 2005	12-inch vinyl; CD	Def Jam	
