= Paradise (LL Cool J song) =

- UK CD single cover

Single by LL Cool J featuring Amerie

from the album 10
- Released: December 14, 2002
- Studio: Sony Music Studios (New York City)
- Genre: Hip hop; R&B
- Length: 4:35
- Label: Def Jam
- Songwriters: James Todd Smith; Curtis Jackson; Jean-Claude Olivier; Samuel Barnes; Amerie Mi Marie Rogers; Kenneth Burke; Allan Felder; Norma Jean Wright
- Producer: Poke & Tone

LL Cool J singles chronology
"All I Have" (2002)	"Paradise" (2002)	"Amazin'" (2003)

Amerie singles chronology
"Talkin' to Me" (2002)	"Paradise" (2003)	"1 Thing" (2005)

Music video
- "Paradise" on YouTube

"Paradise" is a song by American rapper LL Cool J featuring American singer Amerie. The song was released on December 14, 2002, as the second single from LL Cool J's ninth studio album, 10 (2002). It also appears on the soundtrack to the 2003 film Deliver Us from Eva, in which LL Cool J stars alongside Gabrielle Union. "Paradise" embodies portions of Keni Burke's 1982 song "Risin' to the Top", penned by Burke, Allan Felder, and Norma Jean Wright.

== Background ==
"Paradise" was composed by LL Cool J, 50 Cent, Amerie, and Jean-Claude Olivier and Samuel Barnes from production duo Trackmasters for the former's ninth studio album, 10 (2002), with production overseen by Olivier and Barnes. The song embodies portions of American singer Keni Burke's 1982 song "Risin' to the Top." Due to the sample, its songwriters, Burke, Allan Felder, and Norma Jean Wright, are also credited as songwriters on "Paradise." 50 Cent contributed to writing the song's chorus, which was later recorded by Amerie. LL Cool J commented in August 2023: "He didn't write my rhymes [...] when that happened, I didn't even know 50 was involved. That was The Trackmasters, they got that done."

== Commercial performance ==
In the United States, where "Paradise" was released simultaneously with his collaboration with Jennifer Lopez, "All I Have," the song was commercially less successful than its predecessor, "Luv U Better," peaking at number 36 on the Billboard Hot 100 and number 10 on the US Hot Rap Songs chart. It fared better in the United Kingdom, where it opened and peaked at number 18 on the UK Singles Chart, while also reaching number six on the UK Hip Hop/R&B chart. "Paradise" also entered the Australian Singles Chart, peaking at number 28.

== Music video ==
A music video for "Paradise" was directed by Benny Boom and filmed in Maui, Hawaii in fall 2002. Actress Gabrielle Union, LL Cool J's co-star in the romantic comedy film Deliver Us from Eva (2003), appears as his love interest in the visuals, with Amerie also appearing in the video. In an interview with MTV News, LL Cool J commented on the shoot: "Doing that video was like a straight-up fantasy. We had villas on the beach with no television. It was crazy, the look of it, the vibe of it [...] Black sand beaches, waterfalls — it's a whole 'nother thing. It has a little story in it. Me and the young lady, I'm taking her all throughout paradise. It's the ultimate vacation and we're having a lot of fun."

== Track listings ==
- UK CD single
1. "Paradise" (Album Version featuring Amerie) – 4:35
2. "Paradise" (James Yarde Mix featuring Terri Walker) – 5:22
3. "Paradise" (Instrumental) – 4:42
4. "Paradise" (featuring Amerie) (music video) – 4:21
- European CD single
1. "Paradise" (Radio Edit featuring Amerie) – 4:04
2. "Paradise" (Album Version featuring Amerie) – 4:35
3. "After School" (Album Version featuring P. Diddy) – 4:39
4. "Paradise" (featuring Amerie) (music video) – 4:21
- Australian CD single
1. "Paradise" (Radio Edit featuring Amerie) – 4:04
2. "Paradise" (Album Version featuring Amerie) – 4:35
3. "After School" (featuring P. Diddy) – 4:39
4. "LL Cool J Megamix"
5. "Paradise" (featuring Amerie) (music video) – 4:21
- US 12-inch single

A1. "Paradise" (Radio Version featuring Amerie)
A2. "Paradise" (LP Version featuring Amerie)
A3. "Paradise" (Instrumental)
B1. "After School" (Radio Version featuring P. Diddy)
B2. "After School" (LP Version featuring P. Diddy)
B3. "After School" (Instrumental)

- European 12-inch single

A1. "Paradise" (featuring Amerie) – 4:35
B1. "Paradise" (James Yarde Mix featuring Terri Walker) – 5:22
B2. "Paradise" (Instrumental) – 4:42

== Credits and personnel ==
Credits lifted from the liner notes of 10.

- Samuel Barnes – producer, writer
- Kenneth Burke – writer (sample)
- Allan Felder – writer (sample)
- Jason Goldstein – mixing, recording
- Curtis Jackson – writer
- Jean-Claude Olivier – producer, writer
- Amerie Mi Marie Rogers – writer
- James Todd Smith – writer
- Norma Jean Wright – writer (sample)

== Charts ==
=== Weekly charts ===
Weekly chart performance for "Paradise"
Chart (2003)	Peak position
Australia (ARIA)	28
Australian Urban (ARIA)	11
Ireland (IRMA)	48
Italy (FIMI)	41
New Zealand (Recorded Music NZ)	46
Scottish Singles Sales (Official Charts)	40
Switzerland (Schweizer Hitparade)	70
UK Singles (Official Charts)	18
UK Hip Hop/R&B (Official Charts)	6
US Billboard Hot 100	36
US Hot R&B/Hip-Hop Songs (Billboard)	14
US Hot Rap Songs (Billboard)	10
US Rhythmic Airplay (Billboard)	17

=== Year-end charts ===
Year-end chart performance for "Paradise"
Chart (2003)	Position
US Hot R&B/Hip-Hop Songs (Billboard)	81

== Release history ==
"Paradise" release history
Region	Date	Format(s)	Label(s)	Ref.
United States	November 25, 2002	Rhythmic contemporary · urban contemporary radio	Def Jam	
