= Alex Masucci =

American music executive, record producer, songwriter and promoter

Alexander Masucci (born November 11, 1949) is an American music executive, record producer, songwriter and promoter.

== Biography ==
Alex Masucci was born and raised in Brooklyn, New York. His late brother, Jerry Masucci, was an attorney, music executive and co-founder of Fania Records. Masucci attended Universidad de las Américas, A.C. in Mexico City. He began working part-time at Fania Records as a teenager. In 1972 he jointly established A&R Film Distributors with Ray Aviles, which distributed Fania Records' film Our Latin Thing. He subsequently worked at Island Records, Boardwalk Records and PolyGram, and became president of Island Records' Latin music label in Miami. Since then he has formed his own companies, Masucci Entertainment and Haz-Mat Entertainment.

== Early life ==
Masucci was born on November 11, 1949, in Brooklyn, New York to Urbano and Elvira Masucci, both Italian immigrants. His brother Jerry Masucci founded the Latin music label Fania Records. Masucci started working for Fania Records in 1964 at the age of 14, delivering newly pressed records to record shops in Spanish Harlem, first by subway and later in his mother's automobile, from the back of which he also sold records directly. He attended college at Universidad de las Américas, A.C. in Mexico City from 1968 to 1972, earning a degree in Business Administration. During his college years, Masucci spent the summers working for Fania Records.

== Career ==
After graduating from college, Masucci was handed two film canisters of the movie Our Latin Thing by his brother and told to form a company and distribute the film. This was the beginning of A&R Film Distributors, cofounded with partner Ray Aviles. A&R proceeded with four wall distribution in New York, Puerto Rico, Chicago, Venezuela, Panama and Colombia, handling advertising and distribution for Our Latin Thing. Following the film's release, Masucci helped produce live concerts for the Fania All-Stars. The first major concert was held at Yankee Stadium on Friday, August 24, 1973, and was attended by 45,000 people. The concert is included in the second set of 50 recordings preserved by the National Recording Registry. The second major concert was in 1974 featuring Celia Cruz performing with the Fania All Stars at the Stadu du Hai in Kinshasa, Zaire and attended by 80,000 people. In 1975, Fania Records produced two albums from the Yankee Stadium concert, Live at the Yankee Stadium Volumes 1&2, as well as a film of the live concert titled "Salsa." Masucci produced concerts around the country and at Madison Square Garden in 1975, 1976, 1977 and 1978. In 1978, Masucci worked at Island Records at the request of founder Chris Blackwell in order to head Island's Special Projects division. While there, Masucci signed and produced hit albums for Invisible Man's Band, including "All Night Thing," and Third World (band)'s hit single "Now That We Found Love." Masucci also coordinated production on the film featuring Third World (band) titled "Prisoner in the Street." He was also instrumental in orchestrating the breakthrough of Bob Marley into urban radio in the United States. During that time, Masucci and Clarence Burke Jr., formerly of the Five Stairsteps and lead singer of the "Invisible Man's Band," cowrote and produced most of the songs on both "Invisible Man's Band" albums. In 1981, music and film industry visionary Neil Bogart urged Masucci to join his label Boardwalk Records. Masucci and Burke Jr. had previously formed Seduction Productions and agreed to sign with Boardwalk, joining a group of artists including Joan Jett, Ringo Starr and Curtis Mayfield.

In 1997, Chris Blackwell again approached Masucci and asked him to head his new Latin music label, Island Miami. Masucci accepted. After Blackwell's departure from Island/PolyGram, Blackwell and Masucci formed a joint venture between Masucci Entertainment and Blackwell's newly formed Palm Pictures, signing Cuban artist Carlos Manuel y su Clan. Masucci was executive producer on the album, released in 2001. Masucci later formed Haz-Mat Entertainment, through which he has developed film and music projects, as well as a documentary on the history of Fania Records

.

== Discography ==
Production
•Bobby Rodriguez, Lead Me to that Beautiful Band, Vaya Records, 1975, Producer
•Bobby Rodriguez, Salsa at Woodstock, Vaya Records, 1976, Producer
•Bobby Rodriguez, Latin from Manhattan, Vaya Records, 1977, Producer
•Ricardo Marrero, Fania Records, 1977, Executive Producer
•77, Fuego, Alegre Records, 1978, Executive Producer
•All Night Thing, Island Records, 1979, Co-Producer
•Invisible Man's Band, Island Records, 1979, Co-Producer
•Really Wanna See U, Invisible Man's Band, Boardwalk Records, 1982, Co-Producer
•Sunday Afternoon, Invisible Man's Band, Move N Groove Records, 1983, Producer
•Calle Luna Calle Sol, Mangu, Island Miami, 1987, Co-Producer
•Flex, Polygram, 1998, Executive Producer
•Beethoven's 5th, Mark Dimond, Move N Groove Records, 1993, Executive Producer

Writer

- "All Night Thing", Island Records, 1979, Co-Writer
- "Rated X", Really Want to See U, 1982, Co-Writer
- "X Country", Really Want to See U, 1982, Co-Writer
- "Really Wanna See U", Really Want to See U, 1982, Co-Writer
- "Party Time", Really Want to See U, 1982, Co-Writer
- "Same Thing", Really Want to See U, 1982, Co-Writer
