= Distribution deal =

Legal agreement

A distribution deal (also known as distribution contract or distribution agreement) is a legal agreement between one party and another, to handle distribution of a product.

There are various forms of distribution deals. There are exclusive and non-exclusive distribution agreements. In an exclusive distribution agreement, there is only one distributor or distribution agent. The product supplier is excluded from having any other distributors. Thus the product supplier is limited to the performance of that distributor. If the distributor does not sell product, then no product will be sold. Thus the law implies some degree of effort into these distribution agreements. Thus regardless what the distribution agreement says, the law will find it is breached if the distributor does not actually try to distribute the products. Likewise distribution agreements should have explicit terms on point. This problem arises when distributors distribute several products and/or have other businesses.

In a non-exclusive distribution agreement, the supplier may use other distributors, mitigating the above concern. However, at the other end of the spectrum, the supplier may have several distributors, and this may amount to a glut of them in the market, such that distributors have difficulty due to fierce competition on price and terms.

Distribution agreements are frequently broken up in terms of countries, such that a set of supply companies in one market/country, possibly supply companies in related fields like sports equipment, share a distribution agent in another market/country. This keeps costs down, allowing the distributor to use economies of scale.

Another issue that arises is when either the quality of the supplier or distributor substantially deteriorate. If the counterpart supplier/distributor is excessively tied to them, they may suffer as the supplier/distributor's quality/service deteriorates. All of this should be considered when entering distribution deals.

== See also ==
- Independent record label
- Lists of record labels
- List of largest music deals
- Music industry
- Music recording sales certification
