= Five Stairsteps =

American rhythm and blues group

- The Five Stairsteps in 1966

Background information
- Also known as: The Five Stairsteps & Cubie; The Stairsteps; The Invisible Man's Band
- Origin: Chicago, Illinois, United States
- Genres: Chicago soul; soul; psychedelic soul; funk; disco
- Years active: 1965–1976; 1978–1983 (as the IMB)
- Labels: Cameo-Parkway; Buddah; Mango; Dark Horse
- Past members: Clarence Burke Sr.; Alohe Burke; Clarence Burke Jr.; James Burke; Charles Bryant; Dennis Burke; Kenneth "Keni" Burke; Cubie Burke; Dean Gant

The Five Stairsteps, known as "The First Family of Soul" and later "The Invisible Man's Band", were an American Chicago soul group made up of five of Betty and Clarence Burke Sr.'s six children: Alohe Jean, Clarence Jr., James, Dennis, and Kenneth "Keni", and briefly, Cubie. They are best known for the 1970 song "O-o-h Child", listed at number 402 on Rolling Stone's 500 Greatest Songs of All Time.

== History ==
The Chicago group was dubbed "First Family of Soul" because of their successful five-year chart run; the moniker was later passed on to the Jackson 5. Initially a teenage five-member brothers and sister vocal group made up of the children of Betty and Clarence Burke, the Five Stairsteps, named by Mrs. Burke who thought her children looked like stair steps when lined up according to their age, featured lead singer Clarence Jr. (May 25, 1949 – May 26, 2013), Alohe, James, Dennis, and 13-year-old Kenneth ("Keni"). Most of the members attended Harlan High School. Clarence Sr. was a detective for the Chicago Police Department. He backed the group on bass guitar, managed them, and co-wrote songs with Clarence Jr. and Gregory Fowler.

After winning first prize in a talent contest at the Regal Theater, the Five Stairsteps received recording contract offers. A close neighbor and family friend was Fred Cash of the Impressions, who introduced the group to Curtis Mayfield. They signed to Mayfield's Windy City imprint, which was distributed by the Philadelphia-based Cameo Parkway record label, their first single was Fowler's ballad "You Waited Too Long" backed by "Don't Waste Your Time", a Mayfield-penned song. "You Waited Too Long" peaked at number 16 on Billboard's R&B chart in early 1966. Around the end of 1967, Cameo Parkway folded and Windy City switched to Buddah Records through former Cameo Parkway executive Neil Bogart, who joined the new label as co-president. The group's second album, Family Portrait (complete with a montage of Burke family photos), was recorded and produced in Chicago by Clarence Jr. With the addition of their three-year-old brother, the group became the Five Stairsteps & Cubie. Family Portrait yielded two hit singles, "Something's Missing" and a cover of Jimmy Charles and the Revellettes' hit "A Million to One". The group often toured with the Impressions. After signing with Buddah, the group was once again known as the Five Stairsteps.

Clarence Burke appeared as himself on the September 26, 1967, episode of the game show To Tell the Truth, receiving two of the four possible votes by the panel members. Following the round of questioning, the group performed for the audience, singing "Danger! She's a Stranger".

In early 1970, the group released their biggest hit, "O-o-h Child" (written by Stan Vincent), which hit number 14 on the R&B chart and number 8 on the Billboard Hot 100. The record sold over one million copies, and received a gold disc awarded by the Recording Industry Association of America in August 1970. The B-side of the single, a cover of Lennon–McCartney's "Dear Prudence", charted at number 49 R&B. Both songs were included on the group's 1970 album Stairsteps. Later that year, the group's first compilation, Step by Step by Step, was released. The Five Stairsteps appeared in the 1970 film The Isley Brothers Live at Yankee Stadium, a documentary of a benefit concert filmed at the home of the New York Yankees featuring the Isley Brothers, the Brooklyn Bridge and other Buddah-affiliated artists. The following year, the group resurfaced as The Stairsteps with two charting singles: "Didn't It Look So Easy" and "I Love You-Stop". Both were featured on their 1971 album, which was also titled Stairsteps. The group continued to be known as the Stairsteps throughout the early 1970s. Alohe left the group in 1972 to begin a spiritual journey, and went on to attend college, graduate and work at Emory University, where she was also a guest speaker.

Later in the 1970s, Billy Preston introduced the Stairsteps to former members of the Beatles, and the group signed with George Harrison's Dark Horse label, distributed by A&M Records. Their album Second Resurrection was released in February 1976, produced by Preston, Robert Margouleff, and the Stairsteps. "From Us to You", written by Clarence Jr. and Keni Burke, was the group's biggest hit since "O-o-h Child", peaking at number 10 R&B in early 1976. The follow-up single, "Pasado", also covered by the group Pockets, received airplay in Chicago, New York, and other markets. Keni sang, played bass, and wrote both songs featured on the third single, "Tell Me Why" and "Salaam". In January 2014, the album was reissued on CD in Europe by the Solaris label, as was Keni Burke's eponymous Dark Horse album.

Cubie did not often sing with the group, but would grow up to be a popular dancer with the Dance Theater of Harlem and other groups.

== Disbanded ==
After the Stairsteps disbanded, Keni remained with Dark Horse as a solo artist. His self-produced debut solo LP, Keni Burke, was released in August 1977. The singles were "Keep on Singing" and "From Me to You", an instrumental answer to "From Us to You". Becoming an in-demand session bass player, he contributed to recordings by Sly & the Family Stone, Natalie Cole, Billy Preston, Les McCann, the Emotions, Raffi and The Four Tops to Redman, Terry Callier, Stargard, Curtis Mayfield, Bill Withers, Linda Clifford, Silk, Narada Michael Walden, Ramsey Lewis, Dusty Springfield, Diana Ross and Gladys Knight. He appeared as part of Bill Withers' band around this time and co-produced his album Menagerie, which included the hit single "Lovely Day".

=== The Invisible Man's Band ===
In 1978, Clarence Jr. teamed up with New York-based producer Alex Masucci to form the group The Invisible Man's Band. Not interested in recording without his brothers, Clarence convinced Keni, James, and Dennis, along with keyboardist Dean Gant and former Average White Band drummer Steve Ferrone, to come to New York City's Brill building to record an album under the Invisible Man's Band moniker. The group's self-titled debut, produced by Masucci and Clarence Jr. and released in 1980 by Mango/Island Records, featured the heavily disco-styled hit "All Night Thing", which returned the Burke brothers to the top ten on the R&B chart. The tune also reached number 45 on the Billboard Hot 100.

The following year, Clarence Jr. and Masucci formed Seduction Productions. As the new vehicle for the Invisible Man's Band, they signed a production deal with Boardwalk Records, Neil Bogart's successor label to Casablanca Records. The group released a follow-up album, Really Wanna See You. The title track and "Rated X" were issued as singles, but neither track received much promotion, as shortly thereafter, Bogart died and the label was disbanded. The Invisible Man's Band released a final single, "Sunday Afternoon", on the Move 'N Groove record label, formed by Masucci and Clarence Jr. in 1983.

=== Keni Burke resumes solo work ===
Later in 1981, Burke got a new solo album deal with RCA Records. The self-produced LP You're the Best included the singles "Let Somebody Love You" and "You're the Best". His next RCA album, 1982's Changes, yielded his biggest solo hit, "Risin' to the Top". While the song only peaked at number 63 R&B in late summer 1982, it inspired the Mary Jane Girls' breakout hit the following year, "All Night Long". "Risin' to the Top" has since been sampled (often along with "All Night Long") by artists such as LL Cool J ("Around the Way Girl"), Doug E. Fresh ("Keep Risin' to the Top"), Mary J. Blige ("Love No Limit" and "Mary Jane (All Night Long)") and Ali ("Feelin' You").

The second Changes single was "Shakin'". The album also included one of the last songs by Philadelphia songwriter Linda Creed (co-written with Burke), the mid-tempo ballad "One Minute More". Burke worked as a writer/producer (frequently with his former Invisible Man's Band colleagues keyboardist Dean Gant and drummer Steve Ferrone) with the O'Jays, the Jones Girls, the Whispers, Keith Sweat, George Howard, Peabo Bryson, Bill Withers, and Perri, among others. After meeting Expansion Records executive Ralph Tee, Burke signed with the Sony distributed UK label. Nothin' But Love was his first album for the label and was released in March 1998. The first 12-inch single was "I Need Your Love", with vocals by Burke's son, Osaze "Ozzie" Burke.

== Later years ==
Clarence Burke Jr. died on May 26, 2013, at his home in Marietta, Georgia. He was 64. The cause of his death was not disclosed. He was survived by his wife, Crystal, and five children.

Cubie Burke died May 14, 2014, in Smyrna, Georgia, at the age of 49. In addition to his parents and remaining siblings, he was survived by his daughter, DeCoda, and a granddaughter. Speculation was that his death was related to brain trauma, which, according to daughter DeCoda, he had suffered some six years prior.

Dean Gant died April 25, 2020, in an Atlanta area hospital at the age of 67.

Clarence Burke Sr., died on July 16, 2020, the day before his 91st birthday, in an Atlanta area hospital.

James Burke died on February 19, 2021, from pneumonia at age 70.

== Discography ==
=== Studio albums ===
Year	Album	Peak chart positions			Record label
Year	Album	US	US R&B	CAN	Record label
1967	The Five Stairsteps	139	—	—	Windy City
1968	Our Family Portrait	195	20	—	Buddah Records
1969	Love's Happening	198	—	—	Curtom Records
1970	Stairsteps	83	12	—	Buddah Records
1970	Step by Step by Step	199	—	—	Buddah Records
1971	The Stairsteps	—	—	—	Buddah Records
1976	2nd Resurrection	—	—	—	Dark Horse
"—" denotes releases that did not chart.

=== As the "Invisible Man's Band" ===
Year	Album	Peak chart positions			Record label
Year	Album	US	US R&B	CAN	Record label
1980	Invisible Man's Band	90	19	—	Island Records
1981	Really Wanna See You	—	—	—	southside Records
"—" denotes releases that did not chart.

=== Singles ===
Year	Title	Peak chart positions			
Year	Title	US Pop	US R&B	CAN	CAN SOUL
1966	"You Waited Too Long"	94	16	—	—
1966	"World of Fantasy"	49	12	46	—
1966	"Come Back"	61	15	—	—
1967	"Danger! She's a Stranger"	89	16	—	—
1967	"Ain't Gonna Rest (Till I Get You)"	87	37	—	—
1967	"Oooh, Baby Baby"	63	34	—	—
1968	"Something's Missing"	88	17	—	21
1968	"A Million to One"	68	28	—	—
1968	"Don't Change Your Love"	59	15	69	—
1968	"Baby Make Me Feel So Good"	101	12	—	—
1968	"Stay Close to Me"	91	—	—	—
1969	"We Must Be in Love"	88	17	88	—
1970	"Because I Love You"	83	—	—	—
1970	"O-o-h Child"	8	14	3	—
1970	"Dear Prudence"	66	49	65	—
1971	"Didn't It Look So Easy"	81	32	—	—
1971	"I Feel a Song in My Heart Again"	—	—	—	—
1972	"I Love You - Stop"	115	40	—	—
1976	"From Us to You"	102	10	—	—
1980	"All Night Thing" (as "The Invisible Man's Band")	45	9	—	—
"—" denotes releases that did not chart or were not released in that territory.

== See also ==
- List of 1970s one-hit wonders in the United States
- Sibling musical groups
