= Why Don't We Fall in Love =

2002 single by Amerie

- U.S. CD single cover

Single by Amerie

from the album All I Have
- B-side: "Got to Be There"
- Released: April 29, 2002 (US radio)
- Recorded: September 2001
- Studio: Lobo Recording Studios (Deer Park, NY)
- Genre: R&B
- Length: 2:39
- Label: Columbia
- Songwriter: Rich Harrison
- Producer: Rich Harrison

Amerie singles chronology
"Rule" (2001)	"Why Don't We Fall in Love" (2002)	"Talkin' to Me" (2002)

Ludacris singles chronology
"Saturday (Oooh! Ooooh!)" (2002)	""Why Don't We Fall in Love" (Main Mix)" (2002)	"Move Bitch" (2002)

Alternative cover
- UK and Australian CD single cover

"Why Don't We Fall in Love" is a song written and produced by Rich Harrison for American R&B singer Amerie's debut album, All I Have (2002). Released as the album's lead single in the United Kingdom in October 2001 and in the United States in July 2002. After being sent to US Urban/Urban AC, Top 40 and Rhythmic radio in April 2002, the song reached number twenty-three on the Billboard Hot 100 and became a top ten hit on the Hot R&B/Hip-Hop Songs. It performed moderately elsewhere, peaking at number forty in the United Kingdom and number seventy-three in Australia. The song is also used for the promo of the CBS soap opera The Young and the Restless. It is also one of the songs used in the American version of the 2004 video game Donkey Konga 2. Part of the lyrics, along with the background music, was sampled in the song "Rule the World" by 2 Chainz and Ariana Grande from the 2019 album Rap or Go to the League and the 2023 song "No Fake Love" by Queen Naija and YoungBoy Never Broke Again.

== Background ==
In a 2024 interview with Questlove Supreme, Amerie revealed "Why Don't We Fall in Love" was not supposed to be the first single from her album All I Have. She initially wanted "Talkin' to Me" to be her single debut - which was later made to be the second single released. Amerie considered "Why Don't We Fall in Love" to be the album's intro - hence the reason for the short length and the placement as the opening track on her debut album, All I Have. Despite this, Columbia Records insisted the song slated to be released as her first single.

== Music video ==
The single's music video was directed by Benny Boom and filmed in May 2002 in Brooklyn, New York. The video features a guest appearance by Carl Thomas, and was released in June 2002. The video opens with the words "The first day of summer" ( The 1st day of summer was June 21, 2002 and although the date was never clear it was rumored that June 21 was the exact date of the release of the video).

== Remixes ==
The official remix features rapper Ludacris who is also in the CD single and the Japanese edition of the album All I Have. There is also a remix called the "Roc-A-Fella Remix" that features Dipset rapper Cam'ron; another remix also produced by Rich Harrison called the "Richcraft Remix" has new verses by Amerie and a new instrumental. This remix would later appear on her next album Touch in 2005.

== Track listings and formats ==
U.S. double A-side single with "Got to Be There"

1. "Why Don't We Fall in Love" (album version) – 2:39
2. "Got to Be There" – 3:01

UK and Australian CD single

1. "Why Don't We Fall in Love" (album version) – 2:39
2. "Why Don't We Fall in Love" (main mix featuring Ludacris) – 3:33
3. "Why Don't We Fall in Love" (Richcraft Remix) – 3:36
4. "Why Don't We Fall in Love" (instrumental) – 2:48
5. "Why Don't We Fall in Love" (main mix - a cappella featuring Ludacris) – 3:26

UK 12" single

- Side A:
1. "Why Don't We Fall in Love" (main mix featuring Ludacris) – 3:33
2. "Why Don't We Fall in Love" (album version) – 2:39
3. "Why Don't We Fall in Love" (instrumental) – 2:48
- Side B:
1. "Why Don't We Fall in Love" (Richcraft Remix) – 3:36
2. "Why Don't We Fall in Love" (Richcraft Remix Instrumental) – 3:35

== Charts ==
Chart (2002)	Peak position
Australia (ARIA)	73
Australian Urban (ARIA)	18
UK Singles (OCC)	40
UK Hip Hop/R&B (OCC)	11
US Billboard Hot 100 (Billboard)	23
US Dance Singles Sales (Billboard)	3
US Hot R&B/Hip-Hop Songs (Billboard)	9
US Rhythmic (Billboard)	15

=== Year-end charts ===
Chart (2002)	Peak position
UK Urban (Music Week)	34
US Hot R&B/Hip-Hop Songs (Billboard)	43
