= My Old Piano =

Single by Diana Ross

from the album Diana
- B-side: "Where Did We Go Wrong"; "Now That You're Gone"
- Released: September 19, 1980 (UK) / November, 1981 (US)
- Recorded: 1979–Spring 1980
- Studio: Power Station (New York City)
- Genre: R&B; disco; soul
- Length: 3:55
- Label: Motown
- Songwriters: Nile Rodgers; Bernard Edwards
- Producers: Nile Rodgers; Bernard Edwards

Diana Ross singles chronology
"I'm Coming Out" (1980)	"My Old Piano" (1980)	"It's My Turn" (1980)

Music video
- "My Old Piano" on YouTube

"My Old Piano" is a song by American R&B singer Diana Ross. It was written and produced by Chic members Nile Rodgers and Bernard Edwards for Ross's self-titled eleventh studio album (1980). In it, Ross sings about the joy of playing a piano, describing it as if it were a person. The song was released on September 19, 1980 as the album's third and final single by Motown Records in the United States, and the second single elsewhere. In an accompanying music video, Ross appears performing the song in an apartment with an old piano.

Unlike previous singles "Upside Down" and "I'm Coming Out", "My Old Piano" was not as successful in the United States; however, it was a commercial success in Europe, particularly in the United Kingdom, where it was a Top 5 hit and earned her a British Phonographic Industry (BPI) silver disc award for sales in excess of 250,000 copies.

== Track listings ==
7" Single

1. "My Old Piano" 3:55
2. "Where Did We Go Wrong" 3:59

12" Single

1. "My Old Piano" 3:55
2. "Where Did We Go Wrong" 3:59
3. "Now That You're Gone" 3:59

== Charts ==
=== Weekly charts ===
Chart (1980–1982)	Peak position
Australia (Kent Music Report)	25
Austria (Ö3 Austria Top 40)	20
Belgium (Ultratop 50 Flanders)	4
Luxembourg (Radio Luxembourg)	3
Netherlands (Dutch Top 40)	2
Netherlands (Single Top 100)	2
UK Singles (OCC)	5
US Bubbling Under the Hot 100 (Billboard)	9
West Germany (GfK)	15

=== Year-end charts ===
Chart (1980)	Position
Belgium (Ultratop Flanders)	34
Netherlands (Dutch Top 40)	32
Netherlands (Single Top 100)	35

== Certifications ==
Region	Certification	Certified units/sales
United Kingdom (BPI)	Silver	200,000^{^}
^{^} Shipments figures based on certification alone.
