= Hip Hop: A Cultural Odyssey =

- Publisher: Aria Multimedia Entertainment

Hip-Hop: A Cultural Odyssey is a coffee-table book published by Aria Multimedia Entertainment. It contains 420 pages about the origins, evolution, and global impact of hip-hop culture over the past four decades.

== Content ==
The book published by Aria Multimedia Entertainment contains 30 essays on the evolution of hip-hop culture and 40 individual profiles of artists like Kurtis Blow and will.i.am. It contains playlists of famous singles and albums many consider essential to hip-hop's past four decades from the time of the book being created, and 154 interviews with DJs, MCs, producers, graffiti writers, and male and female breakdancers. The photography in the book includes Polaroid portraits captured by photographer Jonathan Mannion and others

Notable artists featured within the book include Jay-Z, Kanye West, Eminem, Run-DMC, Outkast, Queen Latifah, will.i.am, Sean Combs, 50 Cent, Will Smith, Missy Elliott, Native Tongues, LL Cool J, Public Enemy, 2Pac and The Notorious B.I.G. The book also includes a quote from rapper-producer Cee-Lo Green: "It’s our take on our own history and what our contribution to the culture has been."

== Critical reception ==
The Source magazine referred to it as an essential literary and photographic collective of Hip-Hop's essence.

The book is held in the Grammy Museum's hip-hop exhibit.
