= The DEFinition =

Studio album by LL Cool J
- Released: August 31, 2004
- Length: 44:54
- Labels: Def Jam; Universal
- Producers: 7 Aurelius; Dame Grease; Marquinarius Holmes; N.O. Joe; Teddy Riley; Timbaland; Eric Williams

LL Cool J chronology
10 (2002)	The DEFinition (2004)	Todd Smith (2006)

Singles from The DEFinition
- 1. "Headsprung" Released: June 7, 2004; 2. "Hush" Released: September 15, 2004

The DEFinition is the tenth studio album by American rapper LL Cool J, released on August 31, 2004, by Def Jam Recordings. Largely produced by Timbaland, with several tracks produced by N.O. Joe, Teddy Riley, and 7 Aurelius, the album peaked at number 4 on the US Billboard 200 and spawned two singles: "Headsprung" and "Hush". It was certified Gold by the RIAA for selling over 500,000 copies.

The album was nominated for Best Rap Album at the 47th Grammy Awards, but lost to Kanye West's The College Dropout.

== Critical reception ==
Professional ratings
Aggregate scores
Source	Rating
Metacritic	66/100
Review scores
Source	Rating
AllMusic	3.5/5 stars
Artistdirect	3.5/5 stars
Blender	3/5 stars
Entertainment Weekly	B−
The Guardian	3/5 stars
HipHopDX	3.5/5 stars
RapReviews	7.5/10
Rolling Stone	3/5 stars
Stylus Magazine	C

The DEFinition received a mild reception from music critics, saying that it was better than 2002's 10 because of Timbaland's production. At Metacritic, which assigns a normalized rating out of 100 to reviews from mainstream critics, the album received an average score of 66, based on 9 reviews.

Steve 'Flash' Juon of RapReviews called The DEFinition LL's "TRUE tenth album," praising its change in sound from New York to Southern by Timbaland, balancing out the bangers and slow songs well and LL for still keeping his lyrical content up to date, concluding that "this new album proves he doesn't have to give up acting to keep rapping." AllMusic's David Jeffries said that the album had more energy than 10 because of Timbaland's take on the southern sound and finding a balance between braggadocious rap and lovers rap. Gavin Edwards of Rolling Stone also praised the production for updating LL's sound along with his lyrics, saying that "on the eleventh record of his amazingly consistent twenty-year career, LL Cool J has as much swaggering presence as ever." Nick Southall of Stylus Magazine was mixed about the album, saying that he enjoyed the love jams better than the Timbaland bangers which were merely passable, concluding that "there's a distinct lack of personality, meaning that LL Cool J's eleventh long player is merely good, and his reputation (and bank balance) will be neither tarnished nor expanded."

== Chart performance ==
The DEFinition debuted and peaked at number four on the US Billboard 200 in the week of September 18, 2004, selling 173,000 copies in its first week of release. This marked LL Cool J's biggest first week sales yet, surpassing the opening sales of previous album 10, which bowed with 154,000 copies. The DEFinition was certified gold by the Recording Industry Association of America (RIAA) on October 5, 2004. By February 2006, it had sold 747,000 copies in the United States, according to Nielsen SoundScan.

== Track listing ==
Credits adapted from the album's liner notes.

The DEFinition track listing
No.	Title	Writer(s)	Producer(s)	Length
1.	"Headsprung"	James Todd Smith; Timothy Mosley	Timbaland	4:27
2.	"Rub My Back"	Smith; Mosley	Timbaland	4:43
3.	"I'm About to Get Her" (featuring R. Kelly)	Smith; Teddy Riley; Eric Williams; Marquinarius Holmes; Robert Kelly	Teddy Riley; Eric Williams^{[a]}; Marquinarius Holmes^{[a]}	4:21
4.	"Move Somethin'"	Smith; Joseph Johnson	N.O. Joe	3:39
5.	"Hush" (featuring 7 Aurelius)	Smith; Seven Aurelius; Paul Graham; Cornelius Mims; Maurice Traylor; Paul Bushnell	7 Aurelius	3:34
6.	"Every Sip" (featuring Candice Nelson)	Smith; Mosley	Timbaland	4:32
7.	"Shake It Baby"	Smith; Johnson; Dawn Taylor	N.O. Joe	3:48
8.	"Can't Explain It"	Smith; Mosley	Timbaland	4:12
9.	"Feel the Beat"	Smith; Mosley	Timbaland	4:17
10.	"Apple Cobbler"	Smith; Mosley	Timbaland	3:39
11.	"1 in the Morning"	Smith; Damon Blackman	Dame Grease	3:42
Total length:				44:54

Japanese bonus track
No.	Title	Writer(s)	Producer(s)	Length
12.	"The Truth"	Smith	Swizz Beatz	3:41

Notes

- ^{^[a]} signifies a co-producer

== Charts ==
=== Weekly charts ===
Weekly chart performance for The DEFinition
Chart (2004)	Peak position
Belgian Albums (Ultratop Flanders)	90
Canadian Albums (Nielsen SoundScan)	23
Canadian R&B Albums (Nielsen SoundScan)	17
Dutch Albums (Album Top 100)	85
French Albums (SNEP)	136
German Albums (Offizielle Top 100)	50
Scottish Albums (Official Charts)	98
Swiss Albums (Schweizer Hitparade)	35
UK Albums (Official Charts)	66
UK R&B Albums (Official Charts)	11
US Billboard 200	4
US Top R&B/Hip-Hop Albums (Billboard)	3

=== Year-end charts ===
Year-end chart performance for The DEFinition
Chart (2004)	Position
US Billboard 200	125
US Top R&B/Hip-Hop Albums (Billboard)	59

== Certifications ==
Certifications for The DEFinition
Region	Certification	Certified units/sales
United States (RIAA)	Gold	500,000^{^}
^{^} Shipments figures based on certification alone.
