= All I Have (album) =

Studio album by Amerie
- Released: July 30, 2002
- Studio: Cue Recording Studios, Falls Church Lobo Recording Studios, Deer Park The Hit Factory, New York City
- Genre: R&B
- Length: 42:56
- Labels: Richcraft; Rise; Columbia
- Producer: Rich Harrison

Amerie chronology
All I Have (2002)	Touch (2005)

Alternative cover
- Japanese edition cover

Singles from All I Have
- 1. "Why Don't We Fall in Love" Released: April 29, 2002; 2. "Talkin' to Me" Released: October 8, 2002

All I Have is the debut studio album by the American singer Amerie. It was released on July 30, 2002, through Columbia Records, Rise Entertainment and Richcraft Records. Produced by Rich Harrison, the album developed from relaxed, exploratory sessions between the two, with much of it initially recorded in his basement before being polished in professional studios. Musically, All I Have draws heavily on go-go sounds, characterized by dense, percussion-driven arrangements and syncopated rhythms, a style that would go on to become a defining element of Amerie's signature sound.

The album received mixed reviews, with critics praising Amerie’s vocal talent and promise while noting the inconsistency of the material and its lack of originality. All I Have opened and peaked at number nine on the US Billboard 200, spending fourteen weeks on the chart, and reached number two on the Top R&B/Hip-Hop Albums chart. It was certified Gold by the Recording Industry Association of America (RIAA) on October 3, 2003, for shipments figures of over 500,000 copies, and as of July 2009, Nielsen SoundScan reported over 661,000 copies sold in the United States.

All I Have spawned two singles, including the lead single "Why Don't We Fall in Love," which reached number 23 on the US Billboard Hot 100, and the follow-up "Talkin' to Me," which peaked at number 51 and reached the top 20 on the Hot R&B/Hip-Hop Songs chart. To further promote the album, Amerie toured with Usher and Nas on Usher's Evolution 8701 Tour, as well as with rapper Nelly. The album earned her a Soul Train Music Award for Best R&B/Soul or Rap New Artist in 2003 and a nomination for Best R&B/Soul Album – Female at the 2003 Soul Train Music Awards.

== Background ==
In 2000, while studying at Georgetown University, Amerie befriended a Washington, D.C. club promoter who introduced her to music producer Rich Harrison, who had recently worked on Mary J. Blige's albums Mary (1999) and No More Drama (2001) and was looking for a female vocalist. After performing a song for him in her car, the pair began developing demos together. With both artists largely unknown at the time, the sessions were relaxed and experimental, allowing them to explore their sound while cultivating what Amerie later described as their "very special chemistry." Much of All I Have was recorded in Harrison's basement, described as being "next to a laundry machine," with Amerie "sitting on the back of a sofa." Studio sessions followed, during which pre-written songs were refined, with adjustments made to melodies or lyrics as needed.

While the initial recording sessions yielded a wide range of stylistically diverse material, the music on All I Have ultimately drew significant influence from the go-go sound of Washington, D.C. and its surrounding metropolitan area. Characterized by its dense, percussion-driven arrangements, go-go blends multiple interlocking drum patterns with syncopated rhythms and emphatic choral refrains. Lyrically, the album saw Amerie and Rich Harrison exploring the emotional complexities of romantic relationships, resulting in a more restrained and introspective tone overall. As Amerie later observed, the project deliberately avoided placing significant emphasis on overt expressions of sexuality. Their collaboration led to Amerie's first record deal with Harrison's Richcraft Entertainment in partnership with Columbia Records. Her first appearance was when she recorded the chorus for the 2001 single "Rule," performed by label mate Nas.

== Release and promotion ==
All I Have was first released in the United States, for CD and vinyl LP, on July 30, 2002, through Columbia Records, Rise Entertainment and Richcraft Records. It was released on August 5, 2002, in Europe through Sony Music Entertainment. It was also released in Japan, on November 20, 2002, through Sony Music Entertainment Japan.

In April 2002, Amerie's debut single, "Why Don't We Fall in Love", was released, peaking at number 23 on the Billboard Hot 100 and becoming a top ten hit on the US Hot R&B/Hip-Hop Songs and Hot Dance Club Play charts. The song was an urban top twenty hit in Australia and reached the top 40 in the United Kingdom. To promote the album, Amerie went on tour with Usher and Nas, traveling on Usher's Evolution 8701 Tour in 2002. Amerie also promoted the album by touring with rapper Nelly, performing on twelve of his concert dates. The second and final single from All I Have was "Talkin' to Me", a top twenty entry on the Hot R&B/Hip-Hop Songs, although it peaked outside the top forty on the Billboard Hot 100.

== Critical reception ==
Professional ratings
Review scores
Source	Rating
AllMusic	2.5/5 stars
Boston Herald	3/4 stars
Q	3/5 stars
USA Today	2.5/4 stars

All I Have received generally mixed reviews from music critics. Sarah Rodman of Boston Herald gave the album three out of four stars, calling Amerie "blessed with a lovely, flinty voice and great looks" and describing her music as "two parts intriguing [...] and one part run-of-the-mill," while praising her for keeping songs "short, sweet and free from gratuitous vocal acrobatics" and noting that she "stands out from the female R&B pack without resorting to affectation or gimmickry." Vanessa E. Jones of The Boston Globe offered a mixed review, praising "Why Don’t We Fall in Love" as a "shimmering single" with a "strong, yearning alto" that evoked "beach holidays and summer fun," but noting that the album "would be a great debut if it weren't for all the filler" and "tired subjects of love, betrayal, and hate," while concluding it was "definitely a talent to watch."

Felicia Pride from PopMatters gave a mixed review, calling the debut "boring" and noting that many tracks "run into each other," but praising "I Just Died” and "Show Me" as ballads where her vocals are "richer, not as forced" and "dance hand-in-hand with sexy hooks," concluding that "the ingredients are there, she just needs to perfect the mix." Steve Jones of USA Today gave the album two and a half out of four stars, praising Amerie's "talent for subtlety and nuance" on "Why Don’t We Fall in Love”" and her versatility on other tracks, while noting that "the material is not consistently strong" but shows her "great potential for growth." William Ruhlmann of AllMusic gave the album the grade of two and a half out of five stars, calling it "basically a showcase for writer/producer Rich Harrison" and criticizing his "lack of originality," while describing Amerie as having a "pleasant-enough voice" but "nothing to recommend her beyond a fairly anonymous surface appeal."

== Commercial performance ==
The album debuted and peaked at number nine on the US Billboard 200 chart in August 2002, remaining in the top 20 for two weeks only and dropping off the chart in its fourteenth week. The album was certified Gold by the Recording Industry Association of America on October 3, 2003. According to Nielsen SoundScan, as of July 2009, the album has sold 661,000 copies in the United States. It peaked at number one on the US Top R&B/Hip-Hop Albums chart by Billboard. It was also minor success in Japan, peaking at number 181 on the Oricon albums chart.

== Track listing ==
All tracks are written by Rich Harrison except where indicated. Also, all tracks were produced by Harrison.

All I Have – Standard edition
No.	Title	Writer(s)	Length
1.	"Why Don't We Fall in Love"		2:39
2.	"Talkin' to Me"		3:54
3.	"Nothing Like Loving You"		3:51
4.	"Can't Let Go"		4:21
5.	"Need You Tonight"	Rich Harrison; Miroslav Vitouš	3:49
6.	"Got to Be There"	Harrison; Greg Lake	3:01
7.	"I Just Died"		3:29
8.	"Hatin' on You"		3:57
9.	"Float"		4:03
10.	"Show Me"		4:14
11.	"All I Have"		4:08
12.	"Outro"	Harrison; Amerie Mi Marie Rogers; Cory Rooney	1:03
Total length:			42:56

All I Have – Japanese edition (bonus tracks)
No.	Title	Length
13.	"Just What I Needed to See"	3:15
14.	"Why Don't We Fall in Love" (Main Mix featuring Ludacris)	3:30
15.	"Why Don't We Fall in Love" (Richcraft Remix)	3:36
Total length:		52:37

Sample credits

- "Why Don't We Fall in Love" and its remixes contain a sample of "Condor! (Theme)/I Got You Where I Want You", as performed by Dave Grusin from the soundtrack to the 1975 film Three Days of the Condor
- "Need You Tonight" contains a sample of "Synthesizers Dance", as performed by Miroslav Vitouš from the 1976 album Magical Shepherd
- "Got to Be There" contains a sample of "From the Beginning", as performed by Emerson, Lake & Palmer from their 1972 album Trilogy

== Personnel ==
Credits for All I Have adapted from liner notes.

- Drum programming, keyboards, synthesizers: Rich Harrison
- Recording engineers: Jose Sanchez, Ken Schubert, Rich Harrison, Peter Wade, Nichole Cartwright
- Pro-Tools editing: Jose Sanchez, Ken Schubert, Peter Wade
- Mixing: Tony Maserati, Axel Niehaus, Angela Piva, Flip Osman, Pat Woodward
- Executive producers: Daryl Williams, Rich Harrison, Cory Rooney
- Co-executive producers: Jeff Burroughs, Ed Holmes
- Photography: Jonathan Mannion
- Art direction and design: Ron Jaramillo

== Charts ==
=== Weekly charts ===
Weekly chart performance for All I Have
Chart (2002)	Peak position
Japanese Albums (Oricon)	181
UK R&B Albums (Official Charts)	39
US Billboard 200 (Billboard)	9
US Top R&B/Hip-Hop Albums (Billboard)	2

=== Year-end charts ===
Year-end chart performance for All I Have
Chart (2002)	Position
US Billboard 200	195
US Top R&B/Hip-Hop Albums (Billboard)	53

== Certifications ==
Sales and certifications for All I Have
Region	Certification	Certified units/sales
United States (RIAA)	Gold	661,000
^{^} Shipments figures based on certification alone.

== Release history ==
Release history for All I Have
Region	Date	Format(s)	Label(s)	Catalog	Ref.
United States	July 30, 2002	CD; LP	Columbia; Rise; Richcraft	CK 85959 (CD); C2S 58997 (LP)	
Europe	August 5, 2002	CD	Sony Music	5089732	
Japan	November 20, 2002	CD	Sony Music	SICP 283	
