= Talkin' to Me =

- U.S. CD single cover

Single by Amerie

from the album All I Have
- B-side: "I Just Died"
- Released: October 8, 2002 (US Radio add date)
- Recorded: December 2001
- Studio: Lobo Recording Studios (Deer Park, NY)
- Genre: R&B
- Length: 3:54
- Label: Columbia
- Songwriter: Rich Harrison
- Producer: Rich Harrison

Amerie singles chronology
"Why Don't We Fall in Love" (2002)	"Talkin' to Me" (2002)	"Paradise" (2003)

Audio sample
- file; help

Alternative cover
- U.S. 12-inch single cover

"Talkin' to Me" is a song by American R&B singer Amerie from her debut album, All I Have (2002). Produced by Rich Harrison, it was released in late 2002 as the album's second and final single solely in the United States, thus not being able to make the charts elsewhere. A remix of "Talkin' to Me" by the production duo Trackmasters featuring rapper Foxy Brown exists. The song first obtained airplay during the week of October 8, 2002.

== Music video ==
The video was directed by Dave Meyers and first aired in October 2002.

== Single release ==
A promotional single of the song was to be released as a double A-side with "I'm Coming Out", but it never came to surface as the commercial release came for "I'm Coming Out". Instead, "Talkin' to Me" was backed with the All I Have track "I Just Died".

== Chart performance ==
"Talkin' to Me" debuted at number twenty-two on the Billboard Bubbling Under Hot 100 Singles in early November 2002, entering the main chart at number seventy five weeks later and peaking at fifty-one in its fourth week. It also peaked at number eighteen on the Hot R&B/Hip-Hop Songs in late December 2002, having previously debuted at number twenty-three on the Bubbling Under R&B/Hip-Hop Singles.

== Track listings and formats ==
U.S. double A-side single with "I Just Died"

1. "Talkin' to Me" – 3:54
2. "I Just Died" – 3:29

U.S. promo CD single

1. "Talkin' to Me" (Album Version)
2. "Talkin' to Me" (Album Edit)
3. "Talkin' to Me" (Trackmasters Remix featuring Foxy Brown)
4. "Talkin' to Me" (Instrumental)
5. "Talkin' to Me" (Trackmasters Remix - Instrumental)

U.S. 12-inch single

- Side A:
1. "Talkin' to Me" (Trackmasters Remix - Clean featuring Foxy Brown) – 3:35
2. "Talkin' to Me" (Trackmasters Remix featuring Foxy Brown) – 3:35
3. "Talkin' to Me" (Remix featuring Jakk Frost) – 3:50
4. "Talkin' to Me" (Trackmasters Remix - Instrumental) – 3:35
- Side B:
1. "Talkin' to Me" (Trackmasters Remix - No Rap) – 3:34
2. "Talkin' to Me" (Mark Ronson Sunshine Remix) – 3:49
3. "Talkin' to Me" (Mark Ronson Sunshine Remix - Instrumental) – 3:49
4. "Talkin' to Me" (Trackmasters Remix - A Cappella featuring Foxy Brown) – 3:31

== Charts ==
Chart (2002–2003)	Peak position
US Billboard Hot 100 (Billboard)	51
US Hot R&B/Hip-Hop Songs (Billboard)	18
US Rhythmic (Billboard)	40
