= Keni Burke =

American singer

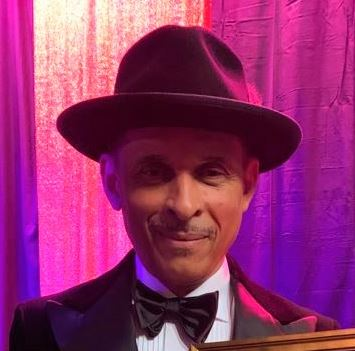
- Burke at the National R&B Music Society Awards Ceremony in 2022

Background information
- Born: Kenneth M. Burke; September 28, 1953 (age 73); Chicago, Illinois, U.S.
- Genres: R&B, soul, funk
- Occupations: Musician songwriter, record producer
- Instruments: Guitar, bass guitar, keyboards bass guitar
- Years active: 1966–present
- Labels: Buddah, Dark Horse, RCA, Expansion

Kenneth M. "Keni" Burke (born September 28, 1953) is an American singer, songwriter, record producer, and multi-instrumentalist.

He began his career with four of his siblings in the 1970s band the Five Stairsteps.

== Biography ==
=== Five Stairsteps ===
As a member of the Five Stairsteps, Burke wrote the group's first minor hit "You Waited Too Long" in 1966, but the group would see their biggest success with the million-selling song "Ooh Child" in 1970. The group went on to sign with George Harrison's Dark Horse Records in 1975, and had their next hit with the Burke-penned "From Us to You", from their 1976 album 2nd Resurrection. The group reemerged for two albums as the Invisible Man's Band but disbanded soon after.

=== Solo career and session work ===
Skilled as a guitarist and bassist, Burke continued to work for the Dark Horse label as a session musician, while burgeoning a solo career of his own. In 1977, he released his self-titled debut album, which featured the songs "Keep on Singing", "Give All You Can Give", and "From Me to You".

During this period he contributed instrumentation to songs by a diverse range of artists such as Sly & the Family Stone, Natalie Cole, Billy Preston, Terry Callier, Curtis Mayfield, Bill Withers, Dusty Springfield, Diana Ross, and Gladys Knight.

In 1981, Burke released his self-produced follow-up solo album, You're the Best, but it was his third album, Changes, which appeared the following year, that made a more significant impact. This album included the singles "Hang Tight" and his signature hit "Risin' to the Top," a big success in Chicago. The latter song has become a popular sampling choice for hip hop artists, having been borrowed by artists such as Doug E Fresh ("Keep Risin to the Top"), Big Daddy Kane ("Smooth Operator"), LL Cool J featuring Amerie ("Paradise"), Pete Rock & CL Smooth ("Take You There"), Mary J. Blige ("Love No Limit"), O.C. ("Born 2 Live"), and Sean Price ("Sabado Gigante"), though a lot of these songs have been mistakenly thought to use the bass line from the 1983 song "All Night Long" by the Mary Jane Girls. In 2006, "Rising to the Top" appeared in the soundtrack for the video game Grand Theft Auto: Vice City Stories, on fictional radio station Vice City for Lovers.

Throughout the 1980s and into the 1990s, Burke continued his session and production work for artists such as Peabo Bryson, The O'Jays, The Jones Girls and Keith Sweat, and in 1998 released his last album to date Nothin' but Love, containing the hit "Indigenous Love", which was popular in the United Kingdom via the Expansion Records Label.

In 2022, Burke received a Lifetime Achievement Award from The National Rhythm and Blues Music Society at The Claridge Hotel, in Atlantic City, NJ.

== Discography ==
See also Five Stairsteps discography

=== Studio albums ===
- Keni Burke (1977)
- You're the Best (1981)
- Changes (1982)
- Nothin' but Love (1998)

=== Compilation albums ===
- The Wonderful World of Keni Burke (1992)
- You're the Best / Changes (2010)

=== Singles ===
Year	Single	Peak chart positions		
Year	Single	US Dance	US R&B	UK
1977	"Shuffle"	—	—	―
1977	"Keep on Singing"	—	—	―
1981	"Let Somebody Love You"	40	66	59
1981	"You're the Best"	―	―	―
1982	"Risin' to the Top"	—	63	70
1982	"Can't Get Enough"	—	―	—
1982	"Shakin'"	―	—	―
1982	"Hang Tight"	―	—	―
1998	"I Need Your Love"	―	―	―
2003	"(Love Is) Alive in My Heart"	―	―	―
2011	"So Real"	―	―	―
"—" denotes releases that did not chart.
