= Risin' to the Top =

Single by Keni Burke

from the album Changes
- Released: May 1982
- Recorded: 1981
- Studio: Sigma Sound, Philadelphia, Pennsylvania
- Genre: R&B
- Length: 5:15
- Label: RCA (JT-13272, US)
- Songwriters: Norma Jean Wright; Kenneth M. Burke; Allan W. Felder
- Producer: Kenneth M. Burke

Keni Burke singles chronology
"Shakin'" (1982)	"Risin' to the Top" (1982)	"Hang Tight" (1982)

"Risin' to the Top" is a song by former Five Stairsteps member Keni Burke. Released in 1982 from his third solo album, Changes (1982), it became his most successful hit as a solo artist, peaking at number 63 on the US Billboard R&B charts and is considered Burke's signature song.

Since its 1982 release, the song has been sampled extensively in R&B and hip-hop songs, most notably the following year in the Mary Jane Girls song "All Night Long". The song appears in the 2006 video game Grand Theft Auto: Vice City Stories in the fictional radio station VCFL.

== Track listing ==
1. "Risin' to the Top" (Stereo) – 5:16
2. "Risin' to the Top" (Acoustic Mix) – 5:56
3. "Risin' to the Top" (Instrumental) – 5:02

== Charts ==
Chart (1982)	Peak position
US Hot R&B/Hip-Hop Songs (Billboard)	63

Chart (1987)	Peak position
UK Singles (OCC)	96

Chart (1992)	Peak position
UK Singles (OCC)	70
UK Dance (Music Week)	8
