= 10 (LL Cool J album) =

Studio album by LL Cool J
- Released: October 15, 2002
- Length: 62:31
- Labels: Def Jam; Universal
- Producers: Zukhan Bey; Big Joe; Chop; DJ S&S; K-1 Million; Ron Lawrence; the Neptunes; Rich Nice; Eric Nicks; Poke & Tone

LL Cool J chronology
G.O.A.T. (2000)	10 (2002)	The DEFinition (2004)

Singles from 10
- 1. "Luv U Better" Released: August 13, 2002; 2. "All I Have" Released: December 14, 2002; 3. "Paradise" Released: January 14, 2003; 4. "Amazin'" Released: April 8, 2003

10 is the ninth studio album by American rapper LL Cool J. It was released by Def Jam Recordings on October 15, 2002, in the United States. LL Cool J and 10 hit a milestone in Def Jam history, being the first artist ever on Def Jam to have ten albums (out of his thirteen-album deal) under the same record label. The album peaked at number two on the US Billboard 200, while also reaching number 26 on the UK Albums Chart.

== Critical reception ==
Professional ratings
Aggregate scores
Source	Rating
Metacritic	60/100
Review scores
Source	Rating
AllMusic	2.5/5 stars
Blender	3/5 stars
Rolling Stone	3/5 stars
The Source	4/5 stars
Uncut	2/5 stars
USA Today	3.5/4 stars

10 earned largely mixed reviews. At Metacritic, which assigns a normalized rating out of 100 to reviews from mainstream publications, the album received an average score of 60, based on eight reviews. Uncut called the project his "best album since 1987's Bigger and Deffer" and felt that 10 "sounds as fresh as his first." Dan Leroy from Launch.com noted that the album "isn't a greatest hits collection – it just sounds like one. Reaching this career milestone, rare for any hip-hop artist, has brought on a rush of nostalgia that saturates each of these 15 songs." USA Today critic Steve Jones rated the album three and a half stars out of four and wrote that 10 showed that LL Cool J "isn't slowing down" after 17 years, balancing seductive tracks like "Luv U Better" with tributes to family, while still delivering "battle-ready self-aggrandizement" on songs like "Clockin' G's" and "Mirror Mirror."

Christian Hoard, writing for Blender, noted that the album uses the "tried-and-true combo of ladybaiting pap and streetwise bravado", but added that: "Musically, though, Ten is a small step forward, as a handful of hot beat engineers beef up LLs typically breezy, jet-setting funk with some new-school bounce." PopMatters editor Matt Cibula found that the album "suffers from the inevitable "L.L. album where he's not necessarily all that hungry and therefore a little too self-satisfied" syndrome, but only periodically. There are times on 10 where he's in full effect boyeee with a side order of chips. It's a fun record, it's a frustrating record, it proves my thesis that L.L. is only dope when he's provoked and hungry." AllMusic critic John Bush remarked: "Surprisingly, despite a strong roster of producers (Tone & Poke, the Neptunes, Ron "Amen-Ra" Lawrence), 10 isn't much of a head-turner [...] Just like on the cover, there's a lot of posturing going on here, but very little substance."

== Chart performance ==
10 debuted and peaked at number two on the US Billboard 200 in the week of November 2, 2002, selling 154,000 copies in its first week of release. By September 2004, 10 had sold 968,000 copies in the United States. The album also reached number 26 on the UK Albums Chart, making it LL Cool J's highest-charting album there to date.

== Track listing ==
10 track listing
No.	Title	Writer(s)	Producer(s)	Length
1.	"Intro"	Richard Jackson	Rich Nice	1:04
2.	"Born to Love You"	James Todd Smith; Jean-Claude Olivier; Samuel Barnes	Poke & Tone	3:42
3.	"Luv U Better"	Smith; Pharrell Williams; Chad Hugo	The Neptunes	4:47
4.	"Paradise" (featuring Amerie)	Smith; Curtis Jackson; Olivier; Barnes; Amerie Mi Marie Rogers; Kenneth Burke; Allan Felder; Norma Jean Wright	Poke & Tone	4:35
5.	"Fa Ha"	Smith; Shampelle Everett; Daryl Hall	DJ S&S	4:55
6.	"Niggy Nuts"	Smith; Williams; Hugo	The Neptunes	3:40
7.	"Amazin'" (introducing Kandice Love)	Smith; Williams; Hugo	The Neptunes	4:16
8.	"Clockin G's"	Smith; Williams; Hugo	The Neptunes	4:08
9.	"Lollipop"	Smith; Zukhan Bey	Zukhan Bey; Eric Nicks	4:45
10.	"After School" (featuring P. Diddy)	Smith; Mark Curry; Donald Woolfolk; James Brown; Robert Ginyard; Bernard Edwards; Nile Rodgers	Chop; Big Joe	4:39
11.	"Throw Ya L's Up"	Smith; Ron Lawrence; Kwamé Holland	Ron "Amen-Ra" Lawrence; K-1 Million	3:52
12.	"U Should"	Smith; Williams; Hugo	The Neptunes	4:20
13.	"10 Million Stars"	Smith; Lawrence; Holland; Michael Gore; Dean Pitchford	Lawrence; K-1 Million	4:01
14.	"Mirror Mirror"	Smith; Olivier; Barnes	Poke & Tone	4:26
15.	"Big Mama (Unconditional Love)" (featuring Dru Hill)	Smith; Curry; Woolfolk; Bruce Howes; Joseph Jefferson; Charles Simmons	Chop; Big Joe	5:34

Special edition
No.	Title	Writer(s)	Producer(s)	Length
16.	"All I Have" (Jennifer Lopez featuring LL Cool J)	Jennifer Lopez; Makeba Riddick; Curtis Richardson; Ron G; Lisa Peters; William Jeffrey	Cory Rooney; Ron G; Dave McPherson	4:14

UK bonus track
No.	Title	Length
16.	"Paradise" (James Yarde Mix) (featuring Terri Walker)	4:14

Samples

- "Paradise" embodies portions of "Risin' to the Top", written by Kenneth Burke, Allan Felder, and Norma Jean Wright, performed by Keni Burke.
- "Fa Ha" contains a sample from "Rich Girl", written by Daryl Hall, performed by Hall & Oates.
- "After School" contains elements of:
  - "It Takes Two", written by James Brown and Robert Ginyard, performed by Rob Base & DJ E-Z Rock.
  - "Rappers Delight", written by Bernard Edwards and Nile Rodgers, performed by the Sugarhill Gang.
- "10 Million Stars" contains elements from "I Sing the Body Electric", written by Michael Gore and Dean Pitchford.
- "Big Mama (Unconditional Love)" features samples of "Sadie", written by Bruce Howes, Joseph Jefferson, and Charles Simmons, performed by the Spinners.
- "All I Have" contains a sample from "Very Special", written by Lisa Peters and William Jeffrey, performed by Debra Laws.

== Charts ==
=== Weekly charts ===
Weekly chart performance for 10
Chart (2002)	Peak position
Canadian Albums (Nielsen SoundScan)	36
Canadian R&B Albums (Nielsen SoundScan)	5
Dutch Albums (Album Top 100)	100
French Albums (SNEP)	106
German Albums (Offizielle Top 100)	64
Scottish Albums (Official Charts)	57
Swiss Albums (Schweizer Hitparade)	19
UK Albums (Official Charts)	26
UK R&B Albums (Official Charts)	3
US Billboard 200	2
US Top R&B/Hip-Hop Albums (Billboard)	1

=== Year-end charts ===
2002 year-end chart performance for 10
Chart (2002)	Position
Canadian R&B Albums (Nielsen SoundScan)	112
Canadian Rap Albums (Nielsen SoundScan)	62
US Top R&B/Hip-Hop Albums (Billboard)	75

2003 year-end chart performance for 10
Chart (2003)	Position
US Billboard 200	130
US Top R&B/Hip-Hop Albums (Billboard)	58

== Certifications ==
Certifications for 10
Region	Certification	Certified units/sales
United Kingdom (BPI)	Silver	60,000^{^}
United States (RIAA)	Gold	500,000^{^}
^{^} Shipments figures based on certification alone.
