= Luv U Better =

2002 single by LL Cool J

Single by LL Cool J

from the album 10
- B-side: "Fa Ha"
- Released: August 13, 2002
- Studio: Master Sound Recordings (Virginia Beach, Virginia)
- Genre: Hip-hop; R&B
- Length: 4:47 (album version); 3:26 (single mix)
- Label: Def Jam
- Songwriters: James Smith; Pharrell Williams; Charles Hugo
- Producer: The Neptunes

LL Cool J singles chronology
| "Blink Blink" (2002) | "Luv U Better" (2002) | "All I Have" (2002) |

"Luv U Better" is a song by LL Cool J, released as the lead single from his ninth studio album, 10 (2002). Released on August 13, 2002, by Def Jam Recordings, it was produced by The Neptunes and features additional vocals from Marc Dorsey and Pharrell Williams. "Luv U Better" was a huge success in the United States, reaching the top five of three major Billboard charts: It peaked at number four on the Billboard Hot 100, number two on the Hot Rap Tracks, and number one the Hot R&B/Hip-Hop Songs.

== Background ==
"Luv U Better" was composed by LL Cool J, Pharrell Williams and Chad Hugo for the former's ninth studio album, 10 (2002), with production overseen by Williams and Hugo under their production moniker The Neptunes. Williams originally approached Case to appear as a guest vocalist on the song and although Case came to New York and recorded his vocals, he was ultimately removed from the song after a Def Jam executive expressed disapproval of his involvement. He was eventually replaced by Marc Dorsey, who remained uncredited for his appearance on the song.

== Commercial performance ==
A major commercial return for LL Cool J, "Luv U Better" became his highest-charting single since 1996's "Loungin," peaking at number four on the Billboard Hot 100. It also marked his second single after "I Need Love" (1987) to top Billboard's Hot R&B/Hip-Hop Songs and reached number two on the US Hot Rap Tracks chart. Elsewhere, "Luv U Better" peaked at number seven on the UK Singles Chart. while also reaching number three on the UK Hip Hop/R&B chart.

== Music video ==
A video for "Luv U Better" was directed by Benny Boom and filmed in Los Angeles, California, including Veteran Avenue. The visuals were inspired by the 1990 American romantic comedy film Pretty Woman. The leading lady in the video was Playboy Playmate and American model Nicole Narain.

== Track listing ==
European maxi-CD single
| No. | Title | Writer(s) | Producer(s) | Length |
|---|---|---|---|---|
| 1. | "Luv U Better" (album version) | James Todd Smith; Pharrell Williams; Chad Hugo | The Neptunes | 4:50 |
| 2. | "Luv U Better" (instrumental) | Smith; Williams; Hugo | The Neptunes | 4:50 |
| 3. | "Fa Ha" | Smith; Shampelle Everett; Daryl Hall | DJ S&S | 4:57 |
| 4. | "Luv U Better" (video) | | | 5:03 |

UK CD single
| No. | Title | Writer(s) | Producer(s) | Length |
|---|---|---|---|---|
| 1. | "Luv U Better" (radio edit) | Smith; Williams; Hugo | The Neptunes | 3:26 |
| 2. | "Luv U Better" (LP version) | Smith; Williams; Hugo | The Neptunes | 4:47 |
| 3. | "Luv U Better" (instrumental) | Smith; Williams; Hugo | The Neptunes | 4:47 |
| 4. | "Luv U Better" (video) | | | 5:03 |

Sample credits

- "Fa Ha" contains a sample from "Rich Girl", written by Daryl Hall, performed by Hall & Oates.

== Credits and personnel ==
Credits lifted from the liner notes of 10.

- Andrew Coleman – recording engineer
- Marc Dorsey – additional vocals
- LL Cool J – vocalist, writer
- Chad Hugo – producer, writer
- Pharrell Williams – producer, writer

== Charts ==
=== Weekly charts ===
Weekly chart performance for "Luv U Better"
| Chart (2002–2003) | Peak position |
|---|---|
| Germany (GfK) | 74 |
| Scottish Singles Sales (Official Charts) | 22 |
| Switzerland (Schweizer Hitparade) | 42 |
| UK Singles (Official Charts) | 7 |
| UK Hip Hop/R&B (Official Charts) | 3 |
| US Billboard Hot 100 | 4 |
| US Hot R&B/Hip-Hop Songs (Billboard) | 1 |
| US Hot Rap Songs (Billboard) | 2 |
| US Rhythmic Airplay (Billboard) | 7 |

=== Year-end charts ===
2002 year-end chart performance for "Luv U Better"
| Chart (2002) | Position |
|---|---|
| UK Singles (OCC) | 191 |
| UK Urban (Music Week) | 27 |
| US Billboard Hot 100 | 73 |
| US Hot R&B/Hip-Hop Songs (Billboard) | 25 |

2003 year-end chart performance for "Luv U Better"
| Chart (2003) | Position |
|---|---|
| US Hot R&B/Hip-Hop Songs (Billboard) | 70 |
