= 112 discography =

This is the discography of R&B and soul quartet 112.

== Albums ==
=== Studio albums ===
List of studio albums, with selected chart positions and certifications
Title	Album details	Peak chart positions									Certifications
Title	Album details	US	US R&B/HH	US R&B	AUS	BEL	CAN	FRA	GER	UK	Certifications
112	Released: August 27, 1996; Label: Bad Boy; Format: CD, LP, cassette, digital download	37	5	—	—	—	17	—	—	—	RIAA: 2× Platinum; MC: Platinum
Room 112	Released: October 27, 1998; Label: Bad Boy; Format: CD, LP, cassette, digital download	20	6	—	—	—	15	—	—	156	RIAA: 2× Platinum
Part III	Released: March 20, 2001; Label: Bad Boy; Format: CD, LP, cassette, digital download	2	1	—	39	19	18	108	50	78	RIAA: Platinum; ARIA: Gold; MC: Gold; BPI: Silver
Hot & Wet	Released: December 9, 2003; Label: Bad Boy, Def Soul; Format: CD, LP, cassette, digital download	22	2	—	—	—	64	—	—	—	
Pleasure & Pain	Released: March 29, 2005; Label: Def Soul; Format: CD, LP, cassette, digital download	4	2	—	98	—	—	118	—	109	RIAA: Gold
Q, Mike, Slim, Daron	Released: October 27, 2017; Label: eOne Music; Format: CD, digital download	106	—	14	—	—	—	—	—	—	
"—" denotes a recording that did not chart or was not released in that territory.

== Extended plays ==
List of EPs
Title	Album details
Forever	Released: September 4, 2020; Label: 112; Format: Digital download

== Singles ==
=== As lead artist ===
List of singles, with selected chart positions and certifications, showing year released and album name
Title	Year	Peak chart positions									Certifications	Album
Title	Year	US	US R&B	AUS	BEL	CAN	FRA	NL	NZ	UK	Certifications	Album
"Only You" (featuring The Notorious B.I.G. and Mase)	1996	13	3	53	—	—	—	—	43	—	RIAA: Gold; BPI: Silver; RMNZ: Platinum	112
"Come See Me" (featuring Mr. Cheeks)	1996	33	15	—	—	—	—	—	—	—		112
"Cupid"	1997	13	2	—	—	—	—	—	—	—	RIAA: Platinum	112
"Love Me" (featuring Mase)	1998	17	8	67	—	17	—	—	33	196	RIAA: Gold	Room 112
"Anywhere" (featuring Lil' Zane)	1999	15	5	96	—	—	—	—	36	—		Room 112
"Love You Like I Did"	1999	—	29	—	—	—	—	—	—	—		Room 112
"Your Letter"	2000	—	78	—	—	—	—	—	—	—		Room 112
"It's Over Now"	2000	6	1	88	—	5	99	54	—	22		Part III
"Peaches & Cream"	2001	4	2	24	—	—	—	67	—	32	BPI: Silver; RMNZ: Gold	Part III
"Dance with Me"	2001	39	20	2	1	—	—	—	—	—	ARIA: Platinum; BEA: Platinum; RMNZ: Gold	Part III
"Na Na Na Na" (featuring Super Cat)	2003	75	24	—	—	—	—	—	—	—		Hot & Wet
"Hot & Wet" (featuring Ludacris)	2003	70	29	—	—	—	—	—	—	—		Hot & Wet
"Right Here for U"	2004	—	72	—	—	—	—	—	—	—		Hot & Wet
"U Already Know"	2005	32	3	—	—	—	—	—	—	152		Pleasure & Pain
"What If"	2005	—	74	—	—	—	—	—	—	—		Pleasure & Pain
"One More Try"	2015	—	—	—	—	—	—	—	—	—		Non-album singles
"Strawberry"	2017	—	—	—	—	—	—	—	—	—		Non-album singles
"Dangerous Games"	2017	—	—	—	—	—	—	—	—	—		Q, Mike, Slim, Daron
"Both of Us" (featuring Jagged Edge)	2018	—	—	—	—	—	—	—	—	—		Q, Mike, Slim, Daron
"Spend It All"	2020	—	—	—	—	—	—	—	—	—		Non-album single
"—" denotes a recording that did not chart or was not released in that territory.

=== As featured performer ===
List of singles, with selected chart positions and certifications, showing year released and album name
Title	Year	Peak chart positions										Certifications	Album
Title	Year	US	US R&B	AUS	GER	NOR	NL	NZ	SWE	SWI	UK	Certifications	Album
"I'll Be Missing You" (Puff Daddy featuring Faith Evans and 112)	1997	1	1	1	1	1	1	1	1	1	1	RIAA: 3× Platinum; ARIA: 2× Platinum; BPI: 3× Platinum; BVMI: 3× Platinum; IFPI NOR: Platinum; IFPI SWE: 2× Platinum; IFPI SWI: 2× Platinum; RMNZ: 3× Platinum	No Way Out
"All Cried Out" (Allure featuring 112)	1997	4	9	11	—	12	8	2	16	—	12	RIAA: Gold; ARIA: Platinum	Allure
"Sky's the Limit" (The Notorious B.I.G. featuring 112)	1997	26	31	—	93	—	75	24	—	—	35		Life After Death
"Right Here Waiting" (Monica featuring 112)	1999	—	101	—	—	—	—	—	—	—	—		The Boy Is Mine
"Callin' Me" (Lil Zane featuring 112)	2000	21	8	—	—	—	—	—	—	—	—		Young World: The Future
"Hey Luv (Anything)" (Mobb Deep featuring 112)	2002	58	32	—	—	—	—	—	—	—	—		Infamy
"—" denotes a recording that did not chart or was not released in that territory.

== Collaborations ==
=== Guest vocals ===
- Key:
  - BGVs – Background vocals
  - K – Keyboards

Year	Artist	Album	Title (s)	Notes
1995	112	Money Train OST	"Making Love"	—
1995	Faith Evans	Faith	"All This Love"	BGVs: Q of 112
			"Faith (Intro)", "Thank You Lord (Interlude)"	K, BGVs: Daron of 112
1996	The Isley Brothers	Floatin' on Your Love (Single)	"Floatin' on Your Love (The Float on Bad Boy Remix)"	—
1997	Puff Daddy	No Way Out	"I'll Be Missing You"	—
1997	112	I'll Be Missing You (Single)	"Cry On"	—
1996	Gina Thompson	Nobody Does It Better	"The Things That You Do (Bad Boy Remix)" (featuring Missy Elliott)	BGVs
1996	Tevin Campbell	Back to the World	"You Don't Have to Worry"	BGVs
1997	112	Hoodlum OST	"I Can't Believe" (Featuring Faith Evans)	(originally from 112)
1997	Allure	Allure	"All Cried Out"	—
1997	Mase	Harlem World	"Cheat on You", "Jealous Guy"	—
1997	The Notorious B.I.G.	Life After Death	"Miss U", "Sky's the Limit"	—
1998	Monica	The Boy Is Mine	"Right Here Waiting"	—
1998	112	New York Undercover: A Night at Natalie's (Original TV. Soundtrack)	"After the Love Has Gone"	—
1999	112	Light It Up OST	"Anything"	—
1999	Lil' Cease	The Wonderful World of Cease A Leo	"Everything"	—
2000	Shyne	Shyne	"Get Out" (Featuring Slim of 112)	—
2000	Lil' Zane	Young World: The Future	"Callin' Me"	—
2002	Mobb Deep	Infamy	"Hey Luv (Anything)"	—
2003	Joe Budden	Joe Budden	"Ma Ma Ma"	—
2004	8Ball & MJG	Living Legends	"Trying to Get at U"	—
2004	Mase	Welcome Back	"The Love You Need" (featuring Rashad)	-
2004	Mario Winans	Hurt No More	"You Knew" (Featuring Slim of 112)	-
2006	Nick Cannon	Stages	"My Wife" (Featuring Slim of 112)	-
2006	Young Gunz	Brothers from Another	"Don't Keep Me Waiting (Come Back Soon)" (Featuring Slim of 112)	-
2006	Ebony Eyez	7 Day Cycle	"Take Me Back" (Featuring Slim & Q of 112)	-
2006	Frankie J	Priceless	"Top of the Line" (Featuring Slim of 112)	-
2007	8Ball & MJG	Ridin' High	"Cruisin'" (Featuring Slim of 112)	-
2017	The Notorious B.I.G., Faith Evans	The King & I	"Crazy (Interlude) (Featuring 112, and Mama Wallace)	-
2019	Tory Lanez	Chixtape 5	"Room 112 (Featuring Slim of 112 and Nyce)	contains a sample from U Already Know

=== Production and writing ===
- Key:
  - BGVs - Background vocals
  - W/CW - Writer/Co-Writer
  - P - Producer

Year	Artist	Album	Title (s)	Notes
1996	Faith Evans	High School High OST	"I Just Can't"	CW
1996	New Edition	Home Again	"You Don't Have to Worry"	CW
1996	Soul For Real	For Life	"Where Do We Go", "Love You So"	CW
1996	Tevin Campbell	Back to the World	"I'll Be There"	BGVs; CW
			"We Can Work It Out"	CW
1996	Total	Total	"When Boy Meets Girl"	BGVs; CW: Mike & Q from 112
1997	Frankie	My Heart Belongs to You	"If I Had You", "One Last Time", "I Have Love", "Wait (Interlude)" "I Can Tell", "Forever With Me", "My Heart", "Forever with Me"	W/CW, BGVs: Q from 112
			"Dear Love"	CW
			"Think of You"	CW, BGVs: Q & Daron from 112
1997	LSG	Levert.Sweat.Gill	"You Got Me"	CW
1998	EOL	Elements of Life	"Love the Way"	CW
1998	Faith Evans	Keep the Faith	"Caramel Kisses" (Featuring 112), "Life Will Pass You By"	CW
1998	Kelly Price	Soul of a Woman	"You Complete Me" (Featuring Daron Jones), "Secret Love"	CW; P: Daron from 112
1998	Total	Kima, Keisha, and Pam	"Press Rewind"	CW
2000	Pink	Can't Take Me Home	"Love Is Such a Crazy Thing"	CW; P: Daron from 112
2001	Usher	8701	"Separated"	P, CW: Daron from 112
2004	Keyshia Cole	The Way It Is	"I Should Have Cheated"	P: Daron; W: Daron & Q from 112
2011	Tyrese	Open Invitation	"One Night"	CW: Q from 112
2012	Ludacris	Ludaversal	"Rest of My Life"	CW: Slim
