= Denyce Lawton =

American actress and model (born 1978)

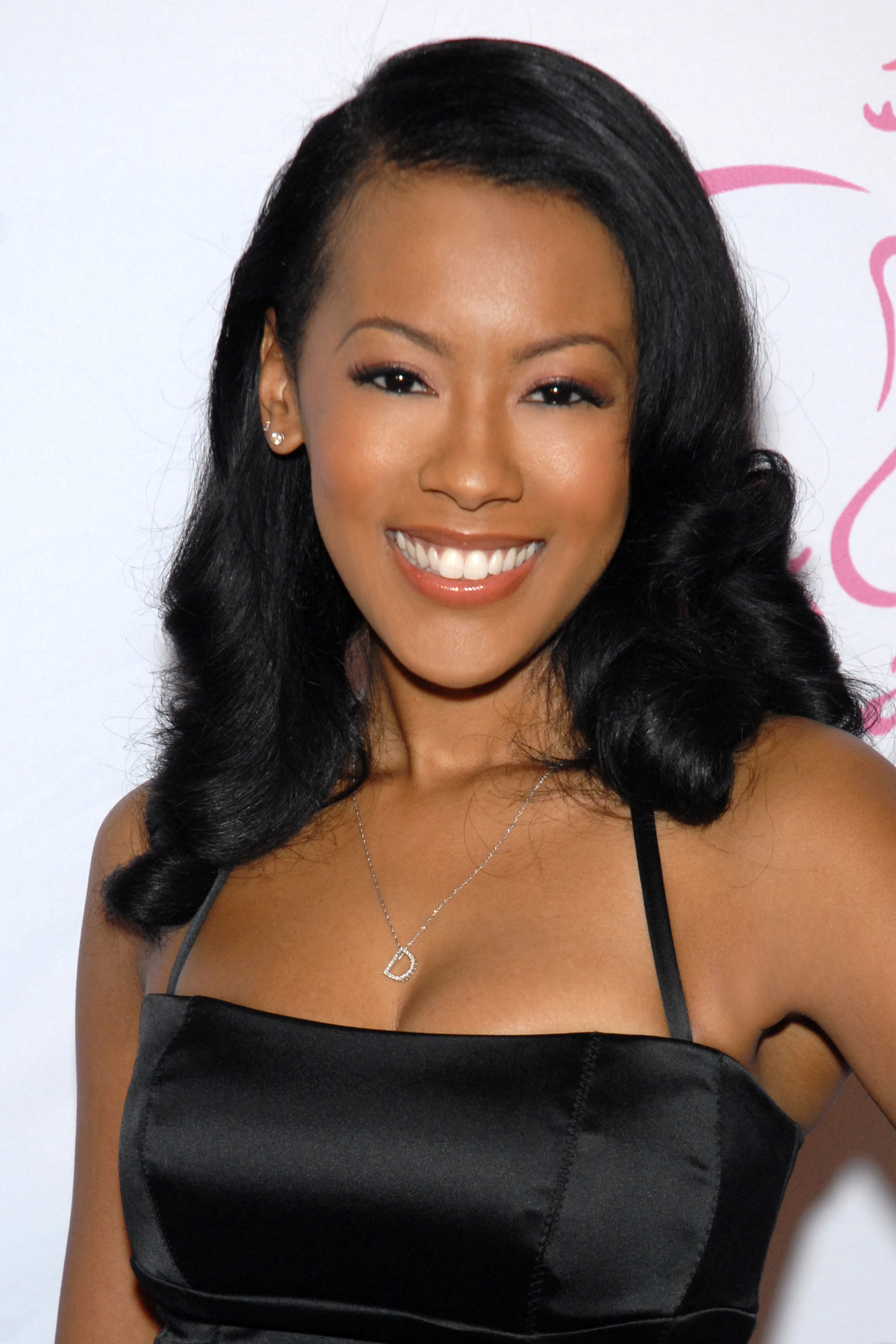
- Lawton in 2008
- Born: May 2, 1978 (age 48); Seoul, South Korea
- Occupations: Actress; model; producer; writer; photographer
- Years active: 1998–present
- Spouse: Eban Grasti (m. 2024)
- Website: denycelawton.com

Denyce Lawton (born May 2, 1978) is an American actress and model of South Korean and African American descent. Lawton is best known for her recurring role as Dana Carter on the Tyler Perry's House of Payne (2008–2009) and her recurring role as Sheila Willis on The Hot Zone (2021).

== Career ==
Before becoming an actress, Lawton was Assistant Vice President of Urban Promotions at Warner Brothers Records and part of artists and repertoire for Priority Records. She later worked for Def Jam Recordings and Murder Inc. Records as a personal assistant to producer Irv Gotti. After becoming a publicist for 20th Century Studios, Lawton was a background dancer for various Broadway performances. Around 2001, she moved to Los Angeles to pursue acting.

Lawton starred in Snoop Dogg's Malice N Wonderland as Love, a short film titled Interception, and the web series Almost Home.

Lawton has appeared on the covers of MAMI Magazine, Black Men, The Source, Today's Black Woman, BQE Magazine, Smooth, Edge Magazine, XXL, J’Adore, Smooth Girl, Daily News, Mass Appeal, and XXL Presents Eye Candy Magazine.

== Personal life ==
Lawton was born in Seoul, South Korea, and raised in New Jersey, United States, spending her childhood in Belmar and Neptune. Of African-American and Korean descent, Lawton is the middle child of three siblings. She graduated from Largo High School in Largo, Maryland, and studied pre-medical at University of Maryland before dropping out to work in theater.

Her younger brother Gregory Jr. was shot and killed on March 24, 2011, during a dispute with a neighbor in Temple Hills, Maryland.

Lawton married her childhood friend Eban Grasti in Washington, D.C. on June 1, 2024. Actress Kyla Pratt and singer Mya were bridesmaids at the ceremony.

== Filmography ==
=== Film ===
| Year | Title | Role | Notes |
|---|---|---|---|
| 2002 | State Property | Bikini Girl #2 | |
| 2002 | Go for Broke | Venom | |
| 2003 | Malibooty! | Beautiful Girl on Beach | |
| 2004 | Soul Plane | Flight Attendant #3 | |
| 2006 | It Ain't Easy | Kelly | Video |
| 2007 | Redline | Mianda | |
| 2007 | Dead Tone | Anna | |
| 2008 | Vlog | Jasmine | |
| 2010 | Malice N Wonderland | Love | Short |
| 2011 | The Love You Save | Shayla | TV movie |
| 2011 | Interception | Sandy | Short |
| 2012 | The Helpers | Brandy | |
| 2012 | Switchin' the Script | Lonnie Shepard | |
| 2012 | The Coalition | Skylar Hathaway | Video |
| 2013 | Winnerz | Carmen | |
| 2013 | Between Sisters | Serena | TV movie |
| 2013 | Act Like You Love Me | Susan | |
| 2013 | Frat Brothers | Professor Simone Breaux | |
| 2013 | The Dempsey Sisters | Deena Dempsey | |
| 2015 | Justice Served | Mia Orlando | |
| 2017 | 2016 | Vivica | |
| 2017 | Secrets | Secret Jenkins | |
| 2018 | All Between Us | Clara | |
| 2018 | Me, Myself, & Them | Dr. Taylor | Short |
| 2018 | When It Comes Around | Jerry | |
| 2019 | Fanatic | Lexi | TV movie |
| 2021 | Most Wanted Santa | FBI Agent Harper Winslow | TV movie |
| 2023 | Under the Influence | Danae Ryan | |
| 2025 | South Haven | Fatimah Moore | |

=== Television ===
| Year | Title | Role | Notes |
|---|---|---|---|
| 2002 | The Parkers | Tyrell's Girlfriend | Episode: "The Crush" |
| 2002 | Half & Half | Beautiful Girl | Episode: "The Big Sistah Sans Soul Episode" |
| 2002 | Scratch & Burn | Beautiful Woman | Episode: "Grocery Store Romance" |
| 2004 | Entourage | Party Girl | Episode: "The Review" |
| 2008 | Vlog | Jasmine | Recurring Cast |
| 2008–09 | Tyler Perry's House of Payne | Dana Carter | Recurring Cast: Season 3–5 |
| 2012 | Girlfriend Confidential: LA | Herself | Main Cast |
| 2013–14 | Almost Home | Becca | Guest: Season 1, Recurring Cast: Season 2 |
| 2014 | Castle | Lillian Hernandez | Episode: "Dressed to Kill" |
| 2016 | Mann & Wife | Jada | Episode: "State of Mann" |
| 2016 | I Love You... But I Lied | FBI Agent Kristen Ramirez | Episode: "Greed" |
| 2018 | The 5th Quarter | Jackie Nichols | Episode: "Hotlanta" |
| 2018 | The Plug | Deena Murphy | Episode: "Bird Gets a Pass" |
| 2019 | Chicago P.D. | Maya Williams | Episode: "What Could Have Been" |
| 2021 | A Luv Tale: The Series | Mercedes | Recurring Cast |
| 2021 | The Hot Zone | Sheila Willis | Recurring Cast: Season 2 |
| 2024 | Universal Basic Guys | Tammy's Friend (voice) | Episode: "Jaws of Life" |

=== Music videos ===
| Year | Title | Artist |
|---|---|---|
| 2001 | "Y.B.E." | Prodigy featuring B.G. |
| 2001 | "Peaches & Cream" | 112 |
| 2001 | "Dance with Me" | 112 featuring Beanie Sigel |
| 2001 | "Family Affair" | Mary J. Blige |
| 2001 | "Break Ya Neck" | Busta Rhymes |
| 2001 | "The Learning (Burn)" | Mobb Deep featuring Vita and Big Noyd |
| 2001 | "Fatty Girl" | Ludacris featuring LL Cool J and Keith Murray |
| 2001 | "Part II" | Method Man & Redman |
| 2002 | "Anything" | Jaheim featuring Next |
| 2002 | "One Mic" | Nas |
| 2002 | "Get Away" | Mobb Deep |
| 2002 | "Rock Star" | N.E.R.D. |
| 2004 | "The Way" | Clay Aiken |
| 2005 | "Curious" | Tony Yayo featuring Joe |
| 2009 | "Want It, Need It" | Plies featuring Ashanti |
| 2021 | "Don't You Ever" | Rotimi |

=== Documentary ===
| Year | Title | Ref. |
|---|---|---|
| 2011 | Kiss and Tell: The History of Black Romance in Movie | |

=== Video game ===
| Year | Title | Role | Ref. |
|---|---|---|---|
| 2022 | Saints Row | MJ/Santo Ileso Pedestrians (voice) | |
