= Part III (112 album) =

Studio album by 112
- Released: March 20, 2001
- Recorded: November 2000 – March 2001
- Genre: R&B
- Length: 58:58
- Label: Bad Boy; Arista
- Producer: Anthony Dent; Daron Jones; R. Kelly; Tim & Bob; Mario Winans

112 chronology
Room 112 (1999)	Part III (2001)	Hot & Wet (2003)

Singles from Part III
- 1. "It's Over Now" Released: November 21, 2000; 2. "Peaches and Cream" Released: March 13, 2001; 3. "Dance with Me" Released: July 17, 2001

Part III is the third studio album by American R&B group 112. It was released by Bad Boy Records on March 20, 2001, in the United States. Unlike the previous releases, the album is described as having edgier, techno-flavored jams, resulting in a more modern and forward-sounding effort. 112 worked with musicians Anthony Dent, R. Kelly, Tim & Bob, Mario Winans, and Bad Boy head Sean Combs on the album, with band member Daron Jones helming production on the majority of Part III. The album was the group's last album with Arista Records.

Upon its release, Part III received generally positive reviews from music critics. The album debuted at number two on the US Billboard 200 chart, in the United States and was certified Platinum by the RIAA. The album produced three singles including "It's Over Now", "Dance With Me" and the smash hit, "Peaches & Cream" the latter of which was nominated for a Grammy Award.

== Singles ==
The first single was "It's Over Now" peaking at number one on the U.S. R&B chart for two weeks. The song's beat is an alternate version of the beat from rap group Mobb Deep's 1999 single, "Quiet Storm". Elsewhere, it peaked at number twenty-two on the UK Singles Chart, their first top 40 hit there. The second single, "Peaches and Cream" peaked at number two on the Billboard Hot R&B/Hip-Hop Songs chart and number four on the Billboard Hot 100, staying in the Top 40 for 25 weeks and making it their highest-charting Hot 100 single to date. It also topped the Billboard Rhythmic Top 40 chart. The song charted at number 32 on the UK Singles Chart on September 8, 2001. The song was nominated for Best R&B Performance by a Duo or Group with Vocal at the 44th Grammy Awards in 2002. Dance With Me was the third and final single peaking at number 39 on the Billboard Hot 100. Elsewhere, in Australia, reaching number two on the country's ARIA Charts in April 2002 and registering as the 28th biggest song of the year. The released version featured American rapper, Beanie Sigel.

== Critical reception ==
Professional ratings
Review scores
Source	Rating
Allmusic	3/5 stars
Entertainment Weekly	A−
NME	3.5/5 stars
Plugged In (publication)	(unfavorable)
Rolling Stone	3.5/5 stars
Vibe	4/5 stars

Part III generally positive reviews from most music critics. Kris Ex of Rolling Stone magazine, noted "Puff Daddy continues to brand his soul acts with everything B.I.G. Here, the slain rapper's "Dead Wrong" serves as intro music; there, a vocal snippet from his "Who Shot Ya" punctuates the R&B quartet's "Dance With Me". But this album doesn't need B.I.G. to bump - the jittery, futuristic "Dance" bounces like something Judy Jetson would jam to when George isn't around, the prurient "Peaches and Cream" thumps hard with synth rattles and a thug worthy groove. The ballads - "Player," "Sweet Love," "Do What You Gotta Do" - drip with sweetness, but not at the expense of cool self-awareness. Produced largely by group member Daron Jones, Part III sounds as if 112 have come to terms with lacking the all-out star power of the boy bands or the uber sentimentality of glory-years Boyz II Men. Enter exhibit Part III: proof positive that Puffy's artists pack dance floors and hit the charts with bullets. We mean the right kind of bullets." Jose F. Promis of Allmusic mentions in his review, "112 have proven themselves as one of the most successful and enduring acts to emerge from the 1990s urban music explosion, and continue to prove their longevity on their third set, Part III. Their second album, Room 112, despite the hits "Love Me" and "Anywhere," failed to hint at any artistic progress for the group, but the third effort is a different story. A lot of the sappy ballads that impaired their previous outings are abandoned in favor of edgier, techno-flavored jams, resulting in a more modern and forward-sounding effort. The album's first single, "It's Over Now," is an aching slice of melodrama that proved to be the group's biggest hit to date, and one of the best singles of the year. Other cuts on the album pick up where that one left off, utilizing cutting beats and electronic sounds, such as the album's dance-flavored opener "Dance With Me," the second single "Peaches & Cream," and "All I Want Is You," which is augmented with rock guitars to fine effect. And as always, the group's vocals are nothing short of stellar. Despite some clichéd lyrics (case in point -- "Don't Hate Me") and sagging ballads toward the middle of the album (although the ballad "Missing You" is a well-crafted slice of true soul), this set is definitely a step in the right direction for a hard-working group one can happily classify as having evolved."

Felicia A. Wilks of Amazon.com, noted "Since New Edition and Boyz II Men ceded their R&B group throne of the '80s and early '90s, it's been hard to keep up with the myriad groups that have tried to take their place. But Bad Boy's resident gentlemen, 112, have always stood out from the crowd. Their latest release, Part III, further solidifies the group's appeal. On "It's Over Now," the album's first single, the group does what they do best: combining impressive vocals with Bad Boy's trademark hip-hop production. Likewise, on "Dance with Me," an intricately produced song with an infectious heartbeat bass line, the group reminds listeners that their singing ability is in a league of its own. Part III is not without its shortcomings, however. Songs like "I Think" and "Player," two monotonous attempts at romantic ballads, could have been deleted from the album without being missed. To the group's credit, however, Part III is one of the most varied and truly captivating albums that the R&B world has seen in a long time. From beautiful harmonizing to upbeat party pleasers, Part III places the four members of 112 up there with the legends of their genre."

== Commercial performance ==
Part III debuted at number two on the US Billboard 200 and number one on the US Top R&B/Hip-Hop Albums chart, selling 182,300 copies in its first week, behind Shaggy's Hot Shot. This is the group's first top-ten album. In its second week, the album dropped to number four on the chart, selling an additional 99,583 copies. On May 16, 2001, the album was certified platinum by the Recording Industry Association of America (RIAA) for sales of over a million copies in the United States.

== Track listing ==
No.	Title	Writer(s)	Producer(s)	Length
1.	"112 Intro"		Lensky Bros.	1:16
2.	"Dance with Me"	Daron Jones; Jason "Poo Bear" Boyd; Quinnes Parker; Michael Keith; Marvin Scandrick	Jones	3:51
3.	"It's Over Now"	Jones; Parker; Melvin Glover; Sylvia Robinson	Jones	4:24
4.	"Peaches & Cream"	Mario Winans; Sean Combs; Keith; Parker; Boyd; Courtney Sills; Aljamaal Jones	Winans; Combs	3:13
5.	"I Surrender (Interlude)"		Winans	1:14
6.	"Missing You"	Jones; Parker	Jones	4:01
7.	"All I Want Is You"	Jones; Boyd; Parker	Jones	3:41
8.	"Don't Hate Me" (featuring Twista)	Anthony Dent; Boyd; Keith	Dent	4:19
9.	"Q, Mike, Slim, Daron (Interlude)"		Winans	1:58
10.	"Player"	Daron Jones	Jones	4:43
11.	"Sweet Love"	Jones; Scandrick; Keith; Parker; Boyd; Sills	Jones	5:26
12.	"Smile"	Tim Kelley; Bob Robinson	Tim & Bob	3:52
13.	"Caught Up"	Kelley; Robinson; Parker	Tim & Bob	4:03
14.	"Do What You Gotta Do"	Robert Kelly	R. Kelly	3:50
15.	"I Think"	Jones; Parker	Jones	4:15
16.	"Still in Love"	Jones; Parker	Jones	4:44

The Gold Remix Edition – bonus disc
No.	Title	Writer(s)	Producer(s)	Length
1.	"Only You" (Mix featuring Notorious B.I.G.)	Combs; Steven Jordan; Christopher Wallace; Mason Betha; D.J. Rogers, Jr.; Scandrick, Keith; Jones; Parker; Harry Wayne Casey; Richard Finch	Stevie J	4:09
2.	"Only You" (Slow Mix)	Combs; Jordan; Wallace; Betha; Rogers; Scandrick; Keith; Jones; Parker; Casey; Finch	Stevie J	4:13
3.	"Love Me" (featuring Ma$e)	Jones; Keith; Scandrick; Parker; Lamont "Stro" Maxwell; Betha; Luther Vandross; Leslie Brathwaite	Brathwaite	4:19
4.	"Anywhere" (featuring Lil' Z & Shyne)	Jones; Keith; Scandrick; Parker; Maxwell; Zane Copeland, Jr.	Jones	5:37
5.	"It's Over Now" (Mix featuring G. Dep & Lil' Z)	Jones; Parker; Melvin Glover; Sylvia Robinson	Jones	4:18
6.	"Peaches & Cream" (P. Diddy Mix)	Jones; Keith; Scandrick; Parker; Combs; Winans; Boyd; Aljamaal Jones; Sills	Winans; Combs	3:49
7.	"Peaches & Cream" (Ludacris Mix)	Jones; Keith; Scandrick; Parker; Combs; Winans; Boyd; A. Jones; Sills	Winans; Combs	3:54
8.	"Dance with Me" (Beanie Sigel Club Mix)	Jones; Boyd; Parker; Keith; Scandrick	Jones	4:59

Sample credits

- "It's Over Now" contains replayed elements of "White Lines", written by Melvin Glover and Sylvia Robinson.

== Personnel ==
- Mark Allen – design
- Wayne Allison – engineer (16)
- Chris Athens – mastering
- Roger Che – engineer (4)
- Sean "P. Diddy" Combs – executive producer
- Tom Coyne – mastering
- Stephen Danelian – photography
- Jan Fairchild – mixing (12, 13)
- Abel Garibaldi – engineer (14)
- Andy Haller – engineer (12, 13)
- Robert Hankerson – engineer (1)
- Lou Heravo – keyboards (1)
- Daron Jones – vocals, instrumentation (2, 3, 6, 7, 10, 11, 15, 16), co-executive producer
- Mike Keith – vocals, co-executive producer
- Tim Kelley – instrumentation (12, 13)
- Jamont Lane – live horns (10)
- Jimmie Lee "Da Burner" – Pro Tools engineer
- Paul Logus – mixing (8, 16)
- DeAndre "Freee" Maiden – associate executive producer
- Tomi Martin – guitar (10)
- Tony Maserati – mixing (14)
- Ian Mereness – engineer (14)
- Q. Parker – vocals, vocal production, co-executive producer
- Marc Pfafflin – Pro Tools engineer
- Rob Paustian – engineer (5, 7-9), mixing (1, 3-7, 9, 10)
- Harve "Joe Hooker" Pierre – associate executive producer
- Bob Robinson – instrumentation (12, 13)
- Marvin "Slim" Scandrick – vocals, co-executive producer
- DJ Scratch – scratching (2)
- Courtney "Bear" Sills – associate executive producer
- Brian Smith – engineer (2, 3, 6, 10, 11, 15), mixing (2, 11, 15)
- Kevin Wales – executive producer
- Mario Winans – instrumentation (4)
- DJ Wiz – scratching (2)

== Charts ==
=== Weekly charts ===
Chart (2001)	Peak position
Australian Albums (ARIA)	39
Australian Urban Albums (ARIA)	5
Belgian Albums (Ultratop Flanders)	19
Canadian Albums (Billboard)	18
Canadian R&B Albums (Nielsen SoundScan)	13
French Albums (SNEP)	108
German Albums (Offizielle Top 100)	50
UK Albums (OCC)	78
UK R&B Albums (OCC)	16
US Billboard 200	2
US Top R&B/Hip-Hop Albums (Billboard)	1

=== Year-end charts ===
Year-end chart performance for Part III by 112
Chart (2001)	Position
Canadian Albums (Nielsen SoundScan)	96
Canadian R&B Albums (Nielsen SoundScan)	23
US Billboard 200	45
US Top R&B/Hip-Hop Albums (Billboard)	18

Chart (2002)	Position
Canadian R&B Albums (Nielsen SoundScan)	129

== Certifications ==
Region	Certification	Certified units/sales
Australia (ARIA)	Gold	35,000^{^}
Canada (Music Canada)	Gold	50,000^{^}
United Kingdom (BPI)	Silver	60,000^{*}
United States (RIAA)	Platinum	1,000,000^{^}
^{*} Sales figures based on certification alone.^{^} Shipments figures based on certification alone.

== Release history ==
List of release dates, showing region, formats, label, and catalog number
Region	Date	Label	Format(s)	Catalog number
United States	March 20, 2001	Bad Boy Records	CD; digital download	B0000039Q7

== See also ==
- List of Billboard number-one R&B albums of 2001
