= J'Adore =

J'Adore may refer to:

- J'Adore (fragrance), a fragrance created in 1999 by Calice Becker for Dior
- J'Adore (magazine), Romanian shopping magazine
- J'Adore (album), an album by Fish Leong, or the title song
- "J'adore", a song by Inna from the album Party Never Ends
