= Pleasure & Pain (112 album) =

Studio album by 112
- Released: March 29, 2005
- Length: 61:28
- Label: Def Soul
- Producer: Darrell "Delite" Allamby; BAM & Ryan; Warryn Campbell; Jermaine Dupri; Ken Fambro; Focus...; Daron Jones; Harold Lilly; The Track Boyz; Mario Winans

112 chronology
Hot & Wet (2003)	Pleasure & Pain (2005)	Q, Mike, Slim, Daron (2017)

Singles from Pleasure & Pain
- 1. "U Already Know" Released: November 23, 2004; 2. "What If" Released: March 11, 2005

Pleasure & Pain is the fifth studio album by American R&B group 112. It was released by Def Soul on March 29, 2005, in the United States. Named after the song "Pleasure & Pain" on 112's 1996 eponymous debut album, 112, the album did not fare as well as their first three albums. It was the first 112 album to get a Parental Advisory sticker (although a few songs from earlier releases contain profanity as well).

== Promotion ==
Pleasure & Pain was preceded by lead single "U Already Know". Released on November 23, 2004, the song peaked at number 32 on the US Billboard Hot 100 and number three on the Hot R&B/Hip-Hop Songs chart, becoming the band's highest-charting single since "Peaches & Cream". Def Soul issued several remixes of the song, including the Murder remix featuring rappers Ja Rule and Harry O and the official Roc-A-Fella remix featuring Foxy Brown. Second single "What If", was released on March 11, 2005. It reached nunber 74 on the US Hot R&B/Hip-Hop Songs.

== Critical reception ==
Professional ratings
Review scores
Source	Rating
AllMusic	3/5 stars
Blender	3/5 stars
Rolling Stone	2/5 stars
Stylus Magazine	C+
USA Today	3/4 stars

Kelefa Sanneh, writing for The New York Times, called Pleasure & Pain "delicious" and sumed it as "an hour of slick, well-written R&B; songs ranging from doo-wop to crunk." Billboard magazine remarked that with the album, "112 recaptures the vocal magic that powered its multiplatinum predecessors [...] Group members Daron, Slim, Q and Mike leave no stone unturned as they mix contemporary R&B with its classic, soulful counterpart [...] After the disappointing 2003 album Hot & Wet, 112 is back on point." USA Today critic Elysa Gardner rated the album three out of four stars. She noted that "these singers' strong suit is still the well-pressed romantic ballad. On the standout track, the plaintive "What If", their creamy voices pour out tension and regret without allowing for drippy excess. Such moments make this fifth album a pleasure for anyone who likes pop-soul smooth but not static."

Al Shipley from Stylus Magazine noted that "although Daron Jones brings a reliable level of craftsmanship to his productions, the contributions of other producers tend to stand out from his in the context of the album [...] In fact, there seems to be a running thread of regret and ruined relationships throughout the album [but] the melancholy tracks never break up the overall soothing vibe enough to stop Pleasure and Pain from doing what an R&B; album’s supposed to do: set the mood." Andy Kellman of AllMusic found that Pleasure & Pain "isn't much different from the previous albums, with a few standout singles and album tracks surrounded by a generous amount of forgettable moments, and a similar ratio of upbeat numbers and ballads to match." Christian Hoard, writing for Rolling Stone, found that after four albums, the band "should at least be able to deliver a couple hot singles, but Pleasure & Pain doesn't even have that. 'If I Hit,' a limpid "Yeah!" rewrite featuring T.I., employs slinky pseudo-electro production; almost everything else is forgettable R&B mush."

== Commercial performance ==
Pleasure & Pain debuted at number four on the US Billboard 200 chart, with sales of 118,000 copies its first week of release. This marked the group's second top-ten album on the chart. On July 15, 2005, it was certified Gold by the Recording Industry Association of America (RIAA) for shipments figures of over 500,000 copies in the United States.

== Track listing ==
Pleasure & Pain track listing
No.	Title	Writer(s)	Producer(s)	Length
1.	"Intro"	Quinnes Parker; Michael Keith; Marvin Scandrick; Daron Jones	D. Jones	0:55
2.	"Let This Go"	Q. Parker; Keith; Scandrick; D. Jones	D. Jones	3:58
3.	"What If"	Darrell "Delite" Allamby	Allamby	5:22
4.	"U Already Know"	Q. Parker; Keith; Scandrick; Sean Garrett; Bernard Edwards, Jr.; Peter Ivers; John Parker	Focus...; Garrett^{[a]}	3:16
5.	"Damn"	Q. Parker; Keith; Scandrick; D. Jones	Jones	3:42
6.	"Nowhere"	Jermaine Dupri; Bryan-Michael Cox; Johnta Austin	Dupri; Cox^{[a]}	3:51
7.	"Last to Know"	Mario Winans; Michael Carlos Jones; Ryan Leslie; Usher Raymond	Winans	3:58
8.	"I'm Sorry (Interlude)"	Jones	Jones	0:45
9.	"My Mistakes"	Q. Parker; Keith; Scandrick; D. Jones; Joe Kent; Mark Williams; Garrett	The Track Boyz	4:37
10.	"If I Hit" (featuring T.I.)	M. Winans; Garrett; Clifford Harris, Jr.	Winans; Garrett^{[a]}	3:53
11.	"The Way" (featuring Jermaine Dupri)	Dupri; Austin; Shawn Carter; Garrett; Dwight Grant; Ricardo Thomas	Dupri	3:21
12.	"We Goin' Be Alright"	Q. Parker; Keith; Scandrick; D. Jones	Jones	1:33
13.	"Why Can't We Get Along"	Q. Parker; Keith; Scandrick; D. Jones; Ken Fambro; Garrett; Kendrick Dean; Cox	Fambro	4:14
14.	"That's How Close We Are"	Warryn Campbell; Harold Lilly; Bill Williams, Jr.; Leon Haywood; Marshall McQueen, Jr.	Campbell; Lilly	3:53
15.	"Closing the Club" (featuring Three 6 Mafia)	Q. Parker; Keith; Scandrick; D. Jones; Antoine "Bam" Macon; Ryan Bowser; Garrett; Jordan Houston; Paul Beauregard	Bam; Bowser; Garrett^{[a]}	4:00
16.	"What the Hell Do You Want"	D. Jones	D. Jones	5:23
17.	"God Knows"	D. Jones	D. Jones	5:04
Total length:				61:28

Notes

- ^{^a} denotes co-producer(s)

Sample credits

- "U Already Know" contains a sample of "Can We Fall in Love Again", as performed by Phyllis Hyman.
- "The Way" contains an interpolation of "Change the Game", as performed by Jay-Z featuring Memphis Bleek and Beanie Sigel.
- "That's How Close We Are" contains a sample of "That Sweet Woman of Mine", as performed by Leon Haywood.

== Personnel ==
- 112 – vocals (background), executive producer
- L.A. Reid – executive producer
- Shakir Stewart – executive producer
- Marcus T. Grant – executive producer
- Daron Jones – producer
- Bryan-Michael Cox – producer
- The Track Boyz – producer
- Jermaine Dupri – producer, mixing
- Kevin Wales – producer
- Mario Winans – producer
- Ken Fambro – producer
- Sean Garrett – producer, vocal producer
- Focus... – producer
- Michael Keith – vocal producer
- Quinnes Parker – vocal producer
- Clifford Henson – vocal engineer
- Paul Osborn – vocal engineer
- Roxanne Estrada – vocals (background)
- Jeanne Allamby – production coordination
- Darrell "Delite" Allamby – producer, engineer, editing, mixing, tracking, vocal engineer, instrumentation
- Bam – producer, instrumentation
- Butch Bonner – guitar
- Floyd "Tag" Merriweather – guitar
- Vernon Mungo – engineer, mixing
- Alvin Speights – mixing
- Bruce Buechner – engineer
- Eric Hunter – engineer
- Tommy Jamin – engineer
- Brian Frye – engineer
- Manny Marroquin – mixing
- Phil Tan – mixing
- Ben Arrindell – mixing
- Jim Beeman – mixing
- Jean-Marie Horvat – mixing
- Ryan Evans – assistant engineer, assistant
- James M. Wisner – assistant engineer
- Josh Monroy – assistant engineer
- John Horesco IV – assistant
- Khary Menelik – assistant
- James Mungo – assistant
- Rob Skipworth – assistant
- Erica Bowen – recording director
- Sandra Campbell – project coordinator
- Warryn Campbell – programming, producer, instrumentation
- Sean Cooper – sound design
- Tom Coyne – mastering
- Nichell Delvaille – art producer
- Roger Erickson – photography
- Sybil Pennix – wardrobe
- Robert Sims – design, creative director
- Eric Weissman – sample clearance
- Matthew Betmalik – prop stylist

== Charts ==
=== Weekly charts ===
Weekly chart performance for Pleasure & Pain
Chart (2005)	Peak position
Australian Albums (ARIA)	98
Canadian Albums (Nielsen SoundScan)	64
French Albums (SNEP)	118
UK Albums (OCC)	109
UK R&B Albums (OCC)	17
US Billboard 200	4
US Top R&B/Hip-Hop Albums (Billboard)	2

=== Year-end charts ===
Year-end chart performance for Pleasure & Pain
Chart (2005)	Position
US Billboard 200	155
US Top R&B/Hip-Hop Albums (Billboard)	39

== Certifications ==
Certifications and sales for Pleasure & Pain
Region	Certification	Certified units/sales
United States (RIAA)	Gold	500,000^{^}
^{^} Shipments figures based on certification alone.

== Release history ==
Release history for Pleasure & Pain
Region	Date	Label(s)	Format(s)	Ref.
United States	March 29, 2005	Def Soul	CD; digital download	
