= Ben Stephenson =

British television executive

- Born: Benjamin Stephenson
- Education: University of Manchester
- Occupation: Television executive
- Employer: Bad Robot
- Spouse: Germán Legarreta

Benjamin Stephenson is a television executive, formerly controller of drama at the British Broadcasting Corporation (BBC) and currently Head of Television at Bad Robot in the United States.

== Education ==
Stephenson attended The Hewett School in Norwich before studying at Manchester University, where he gained a first-class degree in drama.

== Television ==
In 1999 Stephenson worked at Granada as a script editor on the television series Heartbeat. He later worked in the same role for London's Burning and Blood Strangers. Stephenson worked at Channel 4 for over two years, on shows such as No Angels.

He next moved to Shed Productions, and Tiger Aspect. While at Shed, he served as producer on the military drama Bombshell, commissioned by ITV but never shown in the UK. It was screened in New Zealand in 2006.

Stephenson joined the BBC in 2004 working as Head of Development for Independent Drama, later becoming Head of Development for Fiction. In 2008 Stephenson then took the roles of Head of Drama Commissioning at the BBC. to May 2015. His hit-rate during 2011 included a boost of £10m a year extra for BBC Two drama over the next three years, described by Stephenson as "a breath of fresh air". Several of 2011's dramas, including The Crimson Petal and the White and single film United, have performed well. The eight-part science fiction drama Outcasts drew disappointing ratings, despite heavy promotion. In 2011 BBC received five of the eight BAFTA drama awards, including two for Sherlock (selected as the best drama series).

Stephenson was appointed in March 2015 as the Head of Television at J. J. Abrams' Bad Robot production company in the United States.

== Controversies ==
In July 2009 Stephenson wrote a blog article for The Guardian newspaper in response to criticisms of the BBC's drama output. He said:

"If I didn't think differently, have different ideas of what works and what doesn't, wouldn't your lives, and more importantly, your TV screens be less interesting? We need to foster peculiarity, idiosyncrasy, postcodes, my class only stubborn-mindedness, left-of-centre thinking."

The comment was considered to be a breach of the BBC's Royal Charter, which obliges the organisation to be impartial in its output. Jeremy Hunt, shadow culture secretary at the time, called for Stephenson to make "an immediate retraction and apology", stating "no journalist or editor should be following a political agenda, let alone someone as senior as a controller". Similar concerns were expressed by Peter Whittle and Jonathan Isaby.

Critics such as Stephen Glover of the Daily Mail said that rather than being idiosyncratic, Stephenson "is part of the status quo, conforming to the Leftist beliefs that predominate in the BBC." Stephenson later denied that he had meant his comment to have a political meaning, likening it to the phrase "left-field".
