= Antwon Tanner =

American actor (born 1975)

- Born: April 14, 1975 (age 51); Chicago, Illinois, U.S.
- Occupation: Actor
- Years active: 1994–present
- Children: 4

Antwon Tanner (born April 14, 1975) is an American actor. He is best known for his recurring role as Michael on the UPN sitcom Moesha (1996–97), and its spinoff The Parkers (2001). He is also known for his roles as Drano in the sports drama basketball films Sunset Park (1996) and Jaron "Worm" Willis in Coach Carter (2005).

== Career ==
Tanner is mostly known by his role as Antwon "Skills" Taylor on the CW show One Tree Hill. Tanner had a starring role in the 2005 film Coach Carter, where he starred alongside Samuel L. Jackson and has appeared in TV series such as NYPD Blue, 413 Hope St., Sister, Sister, Moesha, The Parkers, and CSI. Tanner also had a role in the film The Wood. In 2007, he starred alongside Brian Hooks, Denyce Lawton, and Cherie Johnson in the horror film 7eventy 5ive.

== Personal life ==
Tanner has four children.

Tanner was arrested on April 16, 2009, and was accused by federal authorities of "knowingly and intentionally" transferring Social Security cards "with intent to defraud". On August 20, 2009, he pleaded guilty in federal court in Brooklyn to selling more than a dozen Social Security numbers for $10,000. He was handed a jail sentence of 3 months for the offense and had to report to prison by April 30, 2010.

== Filmography ==
=== Film ===
Year	Title	Role	Notes
1996	Sunset Park	Drano	
1996	The Sunchaser	Smokes	
1997	One Eight Seven	Augie	
1998	Inferno	Rawhide	TV movie
1999	The Wood	Boo	
2000	Brother	Colin	
2003	Hot Parts	Lester	Video
2004	Never Die Alone	Blue	
2005	Coach Carter	Worm	
2005	Ganked	Billy	Video
2005	Brothers in Arms	Zane	
2007	7eventy 5ive	Kareem	
2009	Steppin: The Movie	Darren	
2009	I Do... I Did!	Tone	
2009	Pimp 24/7	Johnny	TV movie
2011	Payback	Jay-J	Short
2012	Dysfunctional Friends	Nick	
2012	From This Day Forward	Lucas	TV movie
2012	One Blood	Bobby	
2013	The Dempsey Sisters	Thad Dempsey	
2014	Percentage	Flaco	
2014	Cru	Eric 'E.T.' Triggs	
2014	7 Faces of Jack the Ripper	Nick	
2014	Who Can I Run To	Aaron	
2015	Checkmate	Bones	
2017	Two Faced	Benny	
2017	The Perfect Wife	-	
2018	Fade Away	Ron	
2018	The Christmas Contract	Martin	TV movie
2019	A Christmas Wish	John	TV movie
2020	Dear Christmas	Cameo	TV movie
2021	Divided We Fall	Detective Howard	
2023	Primary Position	Sgt. Sammy Washington	
2023	Packz	Club Promoter	
2025	The Roaring Game	Hank	

=== Television ===
Year	Title	Role	Notes
1996	The Client	Sir Echo	Episode: "Motherless Child"
1996	Dangerous Minds	Derrick	Episode: "See Me"
1996–97	Moesha	Michael	Guest: Season 1 & 3, Recurring Cast: Season 2
1997	Crisis Center	Reggie Brown	Episode: "Someone to Watch Over Me"
1997	413 Hope St.	Hakim	Recurring Cast
1998	Sister, Sister	Addison	Episode: "My Father's House" & "Twins or Consequences"
1999	Nash Bridges	Curtin Medders	Episode: "Get Bananas"
2000	Brutally Normal	Shaheem	Main Cast
2000	Touched by an Angel	Lamont	Episode: "God Bless the Child"
2000	City of Angels	Isaac Quinn	Episode: "SWAT's Happening"
2000–01	Boston Public	Kevin Jackson	Recurring Cast: Season 1
2001	The Parkers	Michael	Episode: "Love and Hisses" & "Love the One You're With"
2001	The Tick	Johnny Republic	Episode: "Couples"
2002	NYPD Blue	Devon Claridge	Episode: "Oh, Mama!"
2002–03	The District	Lester Richards	Recurring Cast: Season 3
2003	Skin	Rudy	Episode: "Pilot"
2003-12	One Tree Hill	Antwon 'Skills' Taylor	Recurring Cast: Season 1–3 & 8–9, Main Cast: Season 4–7
2006	CSI: Crime Scene Investigation	Jeremiah	Episode: "Poppin' Tags"
2011	Chase	Jackie Walsh	Episode: "The Man at the Altar"
2014	Rizzoli & Isles	Shabazz Jones	Episode: "Food for Thought"
2014-19	Black Jesus	Jason	Main Cast: Season 1–2, Guest: Season 3
2016	The Carmichael Show	Shawn	Episode: "Ex Con"
2016	Rosewood	Sylvester	Episode: "Sudden Death & Shades Deep"
2017	Get Shorty	Lyle	Recurring Cast: Season 1
2018	Unsolved	Jo Jo Miller	Episode: "The Mack" & "Take Your Best Shot"
2018	The Rookie	Brian	Episode: "The Roundup"
2019	NCIS: Los Angeles	Avron Berry	Episode: "Searching"
2019	Lucifer	Tahir	Episode: "Super Bad Boyfriend"
2020	Boomerang	Greg	Episode: "Reversal of a Dog"

=== Video games ===
Year	Title	Role	Notes
1996	Soviet Strike	Hack	
1997	Nuclear Strike	Hack	
