= List of Billboard number-one R&B albums of 2001 =

These are the Billboard Top R&B/Hip-Hop Albums that peaked at number-one in 2001.

== Chart history ==
Issue date	Album	Artist	Ref
January 6	Tha Last Meal	Snoop Dogg	
January 13	Tha Last Meal	Snoop Dogg	
January 20	Tha Last Meal	Snoop Dogg	
January 27	Tha Last Meal	Snoop Dogg	
February 3	Hot Shot	Shaggy	
February 10	J.Lo	Jennifer Lopez	
February 17	Hot Shot	Shaggy	
February 24	Hot Shot	Shaggy	
March 3	Hot Shot	Shaggy	
March 10	Hot Shot	Shaggy	
March 17	The Professional 2	DJ Clue?	
March 24	Scorpion	Eve	
March 31	Force of Nature	Tank	
April 7	Part III	112	
April 14	Until the End of Time	2Pac	
April 21	Until the End of Time	2Pac	
April 28	Until the End of Time	2Pac	
May 5	Until the End of Time	2Pac	
May 12	All for You	Janet Jackson	
May 19	Survivor	Destiny's Child	
May 26	Survivor	Destiny's Child	
June 2	Miss E... So Addictive	Missy "Misdemeanor" Elliott	
June 9	Malpractice	Redman	
June 16	Miss E... So Addictive	Missy "Misdemeanor" Elliott	
June 23	Free City	St. Lunatics	
June 30	Free City	St. Lunatics	
July 7	Devil's Night	D12	
July 14	Songs In A Minor	Alicia Keys	
July 21	Songs In A Minor	Alicia Keys	
July 28	Songs In A Minor	Alicia Keys	
August 4	Songs In A Minor	Alicia Keys	
August 11	Songs In A Minor	Alicia Keys	
August 18	Songs In A Minor	Alicia Keys	
August 25	Eternal	The Isley Brothers featuring Ronald Isley a.k.a. Mr. Biggs	
September 1	Eternal	The Isley Brothers featuring Ronald Isley a.k.a. Mr. Biggs	
September 8	Now	Maxwell	
September 15	No More Drama	Mary J. Blige	
September 22	No More Drama	Mary J. Blige	
September 29	The Blueprint	Jay-Z	
October 6	The Blueprint	Jay-Z	
October 13	The Blueprint	Jay-Z	
October 20	Pain Is Love	Ja Rule	
October 27	Pain Is Love	Ja Rule	
November 3	Pain Is Love	Ja Rule	
November 10	The Great Depression	DMX	
November 17	Invincible	Michael Jackson	
November 24	Invincible	Michael Jackson	
December 1	Invincible	Michael Jackson	
December 8	Invincible	Michael Jackson	
December 15	Word of Mouf	Ludacris	
December 22	Word of Mouf	Ludacris	
December 29	Infamy	Mobb Deep	

== See also ==
- 2001 in music
- R&B number-one hits of 2001 (USA)
