= Na Na Na Na =

Single by 112 featuring Super Cat

from the album Hot & Wet
- B-side: "To The Crib"
- Released: June 22, 2003
- Recorded: 2003
- Genre: R&B, dancehall
- Length: 4:48
- Label: Bad Boy/Def Jam
- Songwriter(s): Quinnes Parker, Michael Keith, Marvin Scandrick, Daron Jones, William Maragh

112 featuring Super Cat singles chronology
"Hey Luv (Anything)" (2002)	"Na Na Na Na" (2003)	"Hot & Wet" (2003)

Music video
- "Na Na Na Na" on YouTube

"Na Na Na Na" is the first single from 112's 2003 album, Hot & Wet. Q and Slim share lead vocals and the song features Dancehall legend Super Cat.

== Track listing ==
1. "Na Na Na Na" — 4:48
2. "To The Crib" — 3:52

== Charts ==
=== Weekly charts ===
Chart (2003)	Peak position
US Billboard Hot 100	75
US Hot R&B/Hip-Hop Songs (Billboard)	24
US Rhythmic (Billboard)	39
