= Come See Me (112 song) =

Single by 112 featuring Mr. Cheeks

from the album 112
- Released: October 21, 1996
- Studio: The Hit Factory, New York City, New York
- Length: 4:26
- Label: Bad Boy; Arista
- Songwriters: Tim Kelley; Bob Robinson; Terrance Kelly
- Producer: Tim & Bob

112 singles chronology
"Only You" (1996)	"Come See Me" (1996)	"Cupid" (1997)

"Come See Me" is a song by R&B group 112, released in October 1996 as the second single from their self-titled debut album. The song was produced by Tim & Bob, and features rapper Mr. Cheeks. Slim sings lead on the song.

== Weekly charts ==
Weekly chart performance for "Come See Me"
Chart (1997)	Peak position
US Billboard Hot 100	33
US Dance Singles Sales (Billboard)	17
US Hot R&B/Hip-Hop Songs (Billboard)	15
