= Your Letter (song) =

Single by 112

from the album Room 112
- Released: January 22, 2000
- Recorded: 1998
- Length: 5:23
- Label: Bad Boy; Arista
- Songwriter(s): Diane Warren
- Producer(s): Khris Kellow

112 singles chronology
"Right Here Waiting" (1999)	"Your Letter" (2000)	"Callin' Me" (2000)

"Your Letter" is a song by R&B group 112, released in January 2000 as the fourth and final single from their 1998 second album, Room 112.

Q and Slim share lead vocals.

== Charts ==
=== Weekly charts ===
Chart (2000)	Peak position
US Hot R&B/Hip-Hop Songs (Billboard)	78
US Rhythmic (Billboard)	34
