= What If (112 song) =

Single by 112

from the album Pleasure & Pain
- Released: March 11, 2005
- Recorded: 2004
- Genre: R&B
- Label: Def Jam
- Songwriter(s): Darrell "Delite" Allamby
- Producer(s): Darrell "Delite" Allamby

112 singles chronology
"U Already Know" (2005)	"What If" (2005)	"One More Try" (2015)

Music video
- "What If" on YouTube

"What If" was the second and last single released from 112's 2005 album, Pleasure & Pain. Slim sings lead on the song.

== Track listing ==
1. "What If" (Radio Edit) — 3:16
2. "What If" (Instrumental) — 3:16
3. "What If" (Call Out) — 1:16

== Weekly charts ==
Chart (2005)	Peak position
US Hot R&B/Hip-Hop Songs (Billboard)	74
