= Cupid (112 song) =

Single by 112

from the album 112
- Released: May 16, 1997
- Recorded: 1995–1996
- Studio: Daddy's House Recording Studios (New York City, New York); Purple Dragon Studios (Atlanta, Georgia)
- Genre: R&B
- Length: 4:12
- Label: Bad Boy; Arista
- Songwriters: Arnold Hennings; Courtney Sills; Daron Jones; Michael Keith; Marvin Scandrick; Quinnes Parker
- Producer: Arnold Hennings

112 singles chronology
"Come See Me" (1996)	"Cupid" (1997)	"I'll Be Missing You" (1997)

Music video
- "Cupid" on YouTube

"Cupid" is a song by R&B group 112, released in May 1997 as the third and final single from their self-titled debut album. Slim sings lead on the song. The song peaked at number 13 on the Billboard Hot 100 and number 2 on the Hot R&B/Hip-Hop Songs chart, their third top 40 hit on both charts. It was certified platinum by the RIAA for selling 1,000,000 copies.

== Music video ==
Directed by Dante Ariola and Jay Papke, the video features the group singing their affections towards a woman while standing or sitting on a chair, played by actress Garcelle Beauvais.

== Formats and track listing ==
- Europe CD maxi-single
  - 1. "Cupid" – 4:12
  - 2. "Cry On" – 5:26
  - 3. "I Can't Believe" (featuring Faith Evans) – 5:32
  - 4. "Cupid" (Instrumental) – 4:12
  US 7"
  - 1. "Cupid" (Radio Mix) – 4:12
  - 2. "Only You" – 4:21
  US 12"
  - A1. "Cupid" – 4:13
  - A2. "Cry On" – 5:26
  - A3. "I Can't Believe" (featuring Faith Evans) – 5:32
  - B1. "Cupid" (Instrumental) – 4:12
  - B2. "I Can't Believe" (Instrumental) – 5:32
  US 12" (Promo)
  - A. "Cupid" (Radio Mix) – 4:12
  - B. "Cupid" (Instrumental) – 4:12
  US CD single
  - 1. "Cupid" – 4:12
  - 2. "Cry On" – 5:26
  - 3. "I Can't Believe" – 5:32
  - 4. "Cupid" (Instrumental) – 4:12
  - 5. "I Can't Believe" (Instrumental) – 5:32
  US CD single (Cardboard Sleeve)
  - 1. "Cupid" (Radio Mix) – 4:12
  - 2. "This Is Your Day" – 4:47
  US CD single (Promo)
  - 1. "Cupid" (Radio Mix) – 4:12

== Charts and certifications ==
=== Weekly charts ===
Chart (1997)	Peak position
US Billboard Hot 100	13
US Dance Singles Sales (Billboard)	6
US Hot R&B/Hip-Hop Songs (Billboard)	2
US Rhythmic Airplay (Billboard)	6

=== Year-end charts ===
Chart (1997)	Position
US Billboard Hot 100	37

=== Certifications ===
Region	Certification	Certified units/sales
United States (RIAA)	Platinum	1,000,000
