= Dead Tone =

- Directed by: Deon Taylor; Brian Hooks
- Written by: Brian Hooks; Deon Taylor; Vashon Nutt
- Produced by: Brian Hooks; Deon Taylor; Lisa Diane Washington
- Starring: Brian Hooks; Jud Tylor; Antwon Tanner; Cherie Johnson; Wil Horneff; Jonathan Chase; Aimee Garcia; Germán Legarreta; Gwendoline Yeo; Rutger Hauer
- Cinematography: Philip Lee
- Edited by: Lane Baker
- Music by: Vincent Gillioz
- Production companies: Hooks and Taylor Entertainment
- Distributed by: Codeblack Entertainment; Screen Media Films
- Release date: May 16, 2007
- Language: English
- Budget: $3 million

Dead Tone (originally released as 7eventy 5ive) is a 2007 American slasher film directed and written by Brian Hooks and Deon Taylor. It stars Hooks, Antwon Tanner, Cherie Johnson, Rutger Hauer, German Legarreta, Gwendoline Yeo and Aimee Garcia.

== Plot ==
The film begins with a sleepover of children. They prank call people while playing the game Seventy Five. Meanwhile, their parents are in the other room having drinks. The rules of the game are that you must keep a random person on the line for 75 seconds, and they must believe what you're saying. As the night goes on, the kids go to bed, and a man whom the kids recently called calls back, before jumping from a closet and attempting to kill one of the kids before a parent jumped in front of him. The killer goes on to killing the parents in the house with an axe. As the children hide in the bedroom, the killer opens a closet to discover some of the kids and attempts to murder them. Before he can, one of the kid's mothers jumps on him and is then choked to death by the killer. He then hears police sirens and flees. He is never caught.

Ten years later, Chuck (Josh Hammond) is murdered in his house by an unknown figure. Two detectives, Detective Anne Hastings (Gwendoline Yeo) and Detective John Criton (Rutger Hauer) discover Chuck was one of the children involved in the Waley murders 10 years previously. They begin an investigation and find more of the survivors have been murdered. Meanwhile, Brandon (Jonathan Chase) is throwing a party at his fathers secluded mansion. Brandon invites his ex-girlfriend, Karina (Judy Taylor), so he can try to get back together with her, but she insists that her group of friends also come, including Marcus (Brian Hooks), Roxy (Cherie Johnson), Shawn (Germán Legarreta), Kareem (Antwon Tanner), Scott (Wil Horneff) and Jody (Aimee Garcia).

As the group arrive and the party starts, Brandon and his friend Cal (Austin Basis) show everyone around, revealing that the house is filled with cameras which can be monitored on screens in the monitoring room, due to the house previously being used as a reality show set. While the party is happening, Criton and Hastings are looking for the children from the Waley murders. They locate Melissa to find that she has been killed and later find out that a male has also been killed in a different scene. After a few hours of partying, Marcus suggests a game of Seventy Five. Various people take part, until one caller murders someone for the group to hear. They all decide to not answer the phone and continue with their night. As the party finishes and most people leave, Karina and Brandon reconcile. Becky (Ellen Woglom) and Julie (Soraya Kelley) stay up partying with two boys. However, the killer soon arrives at the house and decapitates Becky, before killing the boys and Julie. The killer proceeds to decapitate a boy in the hot tub before drowning his girlfriend. Kareem sees the bodies in the pool and rounds up Roxy, Marcus and Anna (Denyce Lawton) to leave. The group split up to warn the others. Marcus and Anna find Jody and Cal, however they are soon attacked by the killer who murders Anna, while the others flee into Brandon and Karina's room. After Kareem and Roxy arrive with an unconscious Scott, who Kareem accidentally knocked out, the group lock themselves in the room. Brandon blames Marcus for the murders, causing a fight to break out.

After a while of waiting, Brandon and Karina leave to retrieve keys for Brandon's car, while Marcus and Kareem search for Shawn. The killer soon attacks Brandon and Karina, and Brandon is eventually axed in the back, killing him. The killer then throws Karina off the balcony, however she survives and runs into the monitor room to hide. Marcus and Kareem hear someone calling for help and return to the room only to find Scott with a dead Roxy. Meanwhile, Cal goes outside to try and hot wire a car. As he succeeds, the killer appears and beats him to death, although he does manage to summon help to the house. Marcus and Kareem manage to overpower the killer and pin him to the ground. As Kareem urges Scott to kill him, he instead murders Kareem. After confronting Scott and then being attacked by Scott, Marcus hides in the monitor room with Karina, watching in horror as Jody and then Shawn are murdered.

Scott soon comes to the monitoring room, with his accomplice (Kyle Turley), who is revealed to be an inmate from the mental hospital they both recently escaped from. He goes on to reveal that he is, in fact, Scott's twin brother, William, and that he murdered Scott before they left for the party. William tells Marcus he blames him for the deaths of his parents all those years ago as he was the one that wanted to play Seventy Five. William then turns on his accomplice, stabbing him, before a fight breaks out between him, Karina and Marcus. Eventually, William stabs Karina to death. While Marcus swings the axe to kill William, Detectives Anne and John arrive and shoot Marcus, believing he is the killer. As Anne and John comfort William, the accomplice rises with an axe and swings it towards the detectives.

== Cast ==
- Brian Hooks as Marcus
- Antwon Tanner as Kareem
- Cherie Johnson as Roxy
- Aimee Garcia as Jody Walters
- Jud Tylor as Karina
- Wil Horneff as Scott
- Jonathan Chase as Brandon O'Connell
- German Legarreta as Shawn
- Austin Basis as Lucius 'Crazy Cal' Dupree
- Rutger Hauer as Detective John Criton
- Gwendoline Yeo as Detective Ann Hastings
- Ellen Woglom as Becky
- Derek Rook as William
- Denyce Lawton as Anna
- Kyle Turley as Accomplice
- Josh Hammond as Chuck Newton
- Soraya Kelley as Julie
- Holly Boyd as Marcus's mother (opening scene)

== Production ==
The film was produced by Magic Johnson's production company. Producers, Lisa Diane Washington. Associate Producers, Anita M. Cal and Tony Moore.

== Soundtrack ==
The soundtrack was composed by Vincent Gillioz and featured songs from Wyclef Jean and Unset.

== Release ==
The film was shot in May 2005 but remained unreleased for nearly two years. It had its world premiere on 16 May 2007 as part of the Cannes Film Market and its US debut was on July 23, 2007, at the Sacramento Film Festival. The DVD was released on February 9, 2010, from Screen Media.
