= Love You Like I Did =

Single by 112

from the album Room 112
- Released: June 23, 1999
- Recorded: 1998
- Genre: R&B
- Length: 4:18
- Label: Bad Boy; Arista
- Songwriter(s): Daron Jones; Michael Keith; Quinnes Parker; Marvin Scandrick; Lamont Maxwell
- Producer(s): Daron Jones

112 singles chronology
"Anywhere" (1999)	"Love You Like I Did" (1999)	"Right Here Waiting" (1999)

"Love You Like I Did" is the third single from R&B group 112 from their 1998 album, Room 112.

Daron leads the song with Slim leading on the bridge.

== Charts ==
=== Weekly charts ===
Chart (1999)	Peak position
US Hot R&B/Hip-Hop Songs (Billboard)	29
