= Right Here for U =

Single by 112

from the album Hot & Wet
- Released: February 22, 2003
- Recorded: 2003
- Genre: R&B
- Length: 5:17
- Label: Bad Boy/Def Soul
- Songwriter(s): Sean Combs, Donald DeGrate, 112
- Producer(s): Stevie J

112 singles chronology
"Hot & Wet" (2003)	"Right Here for U" (2003)	"U Already Know" (2005)

"Right Here for U" is the third and final single released from 112's 2003 album, Hot & Wet, released as digital download. Q and Slim share lead vocals.

== Charts ==
=== Weekly charts ===
Chart (2004)	Peak position
US Hot R&B/Hip-Hop Songs (Billboard)	72
