= Come Fly with Me (Foxy Brown song) =

Single by Foxy Brown featuring Sizzla

from the album Black Roses (intended)
- Released: July 12, 2005
- Recorded: 2005
- Genre: Dirty rap, reggae fusion
- Length: 3:51
- Label: Roc-A-Fella Records, Def Jam
- Songwriters: Shawn Carter, Inga Marchand, Gregory L. Smith, Wycliffe Johnson, Miguel Orlando Collins, Clifton Brown, D. Ballantine, G. Macdermot
- Producer: Gavin "Young Gavin" Marchand aka Pretty Boy

Foxy Brown singles chronology
"U Already Know" (2005)	"Come Fly with Me" (2005)	"We Don't Surrender" (2007)

"Come Fly with Me" (explicitly "Come Fuck with Me", as the chorus says) was initially the first single from Afro-Trinidadian American female hip-hop artist Foxy Brown's canceled album Black Roses. The single was later dubbed as a promotional release due to the rapper's hearing loss and recovery. It was released on July 12, 2005 as a physical single, with the Black Roses album having a tentative release date of July 26, 2005.
