= Hot & Wet (song) =

Single by 112 featuring Ludacris

from the album Hot & Wet
- B-side: "Na Na Na Na"
- Released: September 22, 2003
- Recorded: 2003
- Genre: R&B, Hip hop
- Length: 3:42
- Label: Bad Boy/Def Jam
- Songwriters: Michael Keith, Quinnes Parker, Marvin Scandrick, Daron Jones, Steven Jordan, Sean Combs, Christopher Bridges
- Producer: Stevie J

112 discography singles chronology
"Na Na Na Na" (2003)	"Hot & Wet" (2003)	"Right Here for U" (2004)

Ludacris singles chronology
"Holidae In" (2003)	"Hot & Wet" (2003)	"Blow It Out" (2003)

Music video
- "Hot & Wet" on YouTube

"Hot & Wet" is the second single released from 112's 2003 album of the same name. Slim sings lead and the song features rapper, Ludacris and was produced by Stevie J.

== Track listing ==
1. "Hot & Wet" (featuring Ludacris) — 3:42
2. "Na Na Na Na" (featuring Super Cat) — 3:43

== Charts ==
=== Weekly charts ===
Chart (2003)	Peak position
US Billboard Hot 100	70
US Hot R&B/Hip-Hop Songs (Billboard)	29
US Rhythmic Airplay (Billboard)	24
