= Girlfriend Confidential: LA =

- Nikki Chu, Kelly Marie Dunn, Eva Marcille and Denyce Lawton (from left)
- Genre: Documentary
- Starring: Denyce Lawton; Eva Marcille; Kelly Marie Dunn; Nikki Chu
- Country of origin: United States
- Original language: English
- No. of seasons: 1
- No. of episodes: 6

Production
- Executive producers: Gil Lopez; Madison Merritt; Michael Hirschorn; Wendy Roth
- Production company: Ish Entertainment

Original release
- Network: Oxygen
- Release: September 3 – October 8, 2012

Girlfriend Confidential: LA is an American reality television series on Oxygen. The series premiered on September 3, 2012.

== Premise ==
The series follows a group of friends as they navigate through the treacherous waters of the Hollywood entertainment industry.

== Episodes ==
Season	Episodes	Originally released	
Season	Episodes	First released	Last released
1	6	September 3, 2012	October 8, 2012

=== Season 1 (2012) ===
No.	Title	Original release date
1	"Nobody's Housewives"	September 3, 2012
2	"Fireworks"	September 10, 2012
Denyce creates drama at a celebrity's house party which annoys the group.
3	"Friendtervention"	September 17, 2012
Eva receives shocking news which makes her consider a new career. Denyce is fed up with all the rumors going around about her. Nikki is shocked when her biological father is ready to fix their relationship.
4	"So Emotional"	September 24, 2012
Denyce gets a new chance with her job. Nikki forgives her father and the two start their chance to make up lost time. Kelly starts to manage an R&B artist.
5	"Closure"	October 1, 2012
Nikki gets some shocking news about her biological father's past. Eva and Anthony's relationship is tested when tension arises. Denyce receives information about her brother's murder.
6	"Not So Fast"	October 8, 2012
Kelly gets hired to re-brand an upcoming artist. Nikki gets pressured to further her love life. Eva is ecstatic for her one year anniversary with Anthony. Denyce gets a tattoo to remember her brother.
