= Hot & Wet =

Studio album by 112
- Released: December 9, 2003
- Length: 70:03
- Label: Bad Boy; Def Soul
- Producer: Sean Combs; Saint Denson; Anthony Dent; Dre & Vidal; Stevie J.; Daron Jones; Spi

112 chronology
Part III (2001)	Hot & Wet (2003)	Pleasure & Pain (2005)

Singles from Hot & Wet
- 1. "Na Na Na Na" Released: July 22, 2003; 2. "Hot & Wet" Released: September 22, 2003; 3. "Right Here for U" Released: January 2, 2004; 4. "Give It to Me" Released: April 13, 2004

Hot & Wet is the fourth studio album by American R&B group 112. It was released by Bad Boy Records and Def Soul on December 9, 2003 in the United States. Their first album not exclusively associated with Bad Boy, signaling the groups' eventual departure from the label in 2004, Hot & Wet followed the band's 2001 album Part III. At the 2005 Soul Train Music Awards, the album was nomintated for Best R&B/Soul Album – Group, Band or Duo but lost to Destiny's Child's Destiny Fulfilled (2004).

== Background ==
In 2002, the group members, having matured both personally and professionally, came to the realization that a split with the Bad Boy label was necessary due to the lack of interest. In search of greater creative control, 112 left Bad Boy Records in February 2002 and signed with Def Jam in July on their Def Soul-imprint, insisting that the breakup was amicable. They reiterated this "no-hard-feelings" attitude by going to Daddy's House to record a debut album for Def Jam. Disagreements remained over ownership rights to the 112 catalog of songs, and this album – the Def Jam debut disc was waylaid as a result, while negotiations ensued between Lyor Cohen of Def Jam and Bad Boy owner Combs. With both sides ultimately in agreement, Hot & Wet would eventually appear in November 2003.

== Promotion ==
Hot & Wet's first single "Na Na Na Na" featuring dance hall legend Super Cat was released on July 22, 2003. It reached number 24 on the US Hot R&B/Hip-Hop Songs chart. Second single "Hot & Wet" was released on September 22, 2003 and features rapper, Ludacris. It peaked at number 29 on the Hot R&B/Hip-Hop Songs chart. The album's third single "Right Here for U" charted at number 72 on the US Hot R&B/Hip-Hop Songs chart on January 2, 2004, but was released as a digital download only. Fourth and final single "Give It to Me" was released on April 13, 2004.

== Critical reception ==
Professional ratings
Review scores
Source	Rating
AllMusic	2.5/5 stars
Blender	3/5 stars
Rolling Stone	2/5 stars
Vibe	3/5 stars

AllMusic editor Andy Kellman found that Hot & Wet offered "the same mixed bag of strong singles and inconsistent album cuts that fans have grown accustomed to since the 1996 debut [...] The overabundance of slow-tempo material weighs down the listen, which is especially problematic since the album is nearly 70 minutes in duration." Jon Caramanica from Rolling Stone wrote that most of the "album moves at a snail's pace, though – an undifferentiated set of slooowww jams that suggest 112 are asleep at the wheel." Laura Checkoway from Vibe found that "though Hot sizzles at times, lukewarm and robotically simple cuts dampen the party spirit [...] This crew’s at its best when it focuses on the bedrooms and dance floors. Yes, life has its blues, but with 112, we’ve come to expect nothing short of peaches and cream."

== Commercial performance ==
Hot & Wet debuted and peaked at number 22 on the US Billboard 200 in the week of December 6, 2003, with first week sales of 92,000 units. It also opened and peaked at number four on the US Top R&B/Hip-Hop Albums chart. By March 2005, the album had sold 380,000 units in the United States, according to Nielsen SoundScan, which was seen as a considerable decline compared to the 1.9-million selling release Part III (2001). In 2005, Daron Jones commented on the album's commercial performance: "Hot & Wet wasn't a bad album. But the choice of singles helped make the album not as successful as it should have been, and some of the imaging was off."

== Track listing ==
Hot & Wet track listing
No.	Title	Writer(s)	Producer(s)	Length
1.	"Medley"		Stevie J	2:32
2.	"It's Goin' Down 2Nite" (featuring T.I.)	Michael Keith; Quinnes Parker; Marvin Scandrick; Daron Jones; Clifford Harris	Jones	4:42
3.	"Hot & Wet" (featuring Ludacris)	Keith; Parker; Scandrick; Jones; Jordan; Sean Combs; Christopher Bridges	Combs; Stevie J	3:41
4.	"Unbelievable"	Keith; Parker; Scandrick; Jones; Combs	Jones	4:17
5.	"Everyday"	Keith; Parker; Scandrick; Jones; Robert Hankerson; The Isley Brothers; William DeVaughn	Saint Denson	4:29
6.	"I Belong to You" (Interlude)	Keith; Parker; Scandrick; Jones	Jones	1:23
7.	"Right Here for U"	Keith; Parker; Scandrick; Jones; Jordan; Combs; Donald DeGrate; Roger Troutman; Terry Troutman	Combs; Stevie J	5:13
8.	"All My Love"	Keith; Parker; Scandrick; Jones	Jones	4:41
9.	"You Said"	Keith; Parker; Scandrick; Jones	Jones	4:16
10.	"Knock U Down" (Interlude)	Jason Boyd; Jordan	Stevie J	1:46
11.	"Knock U Down"	Keith; Parker; Scandrick; Jones; Jordan	Stevie J	4:21
12.	"Hot & Wet" (Remix) (featuring Ludacris and Chingy)	Keith; Parker; Scandrick; Jones; Jordan; Combs; Bridges; Kenton Nix	Combs; Stevie J	4:15
13.	"Na Na Na Na" (featuring Super Cat)	Keith; Parker; Scandrick; Jones; William Maragh	Jones	3:40
14.	"Give It to Me"	Keith; Parker; Scandrick; Jones; Anthony Dent; K. Hatcher; Boyd; Herb Alpert; Andy Armer; Randy Badazz; George Clinton; Rashawnna Guy; Philippé Wynne	Dent; Spi	3:58
15.	"Slip Away"	Keith; Parker; Scandrick; Jones	Jones	4:37
16.	"Say Yes"	Keith; Parker; Scandrick; Jones; Adonis Shropshire	Dre & Vidal	4:01
17.	"Man's World"	Keith; Parker; Scandrick; Jones	Jones	5:03
Total length:				70:03

Bonus track
No.	Title	Writer(s)	Producer(s)	Length
18.	"Na Na Na Na" (Reggae Remix) (featuring Spragga Benz, Lady Saw, Buccaneer and Damian Marley)	Keith; Parker; Scandrick; Jones	Jones	4:30

== Personnel ==
- Chris Athens — mastering
- Leesa Brunson — A&R assistance
- Jonathan "Chronic Face" Burke — vocal engineer
- Isaac Carree — vocals
- Dru Castro — engineer
- Da Twelve — executive producer
- Tina Davis — A&R
- Vidal Davis — producer
- Dent — multi instruments, producer
- Stephen Dent — producer, engineer, instrumentation
- Diddy — producer, executive producer
- Emery Dobyns — engineer
- Steve Fisher — assistant
- Marcus T. Grant — executive producer
- Andre Harris — producer
- Stevie J. — producer, overdubs, compilation
- Jahaun Johnson — A&R
- Daron Jones — multi instruments, producer, instrumentation
- Jonathan Jordan — engineer
- Victoria Jordan — art direction
- Terese Joseph — recording director
- Jonathan Kaslow — A&R, artist coordination
- Rich Keller — engineer, mixing
- Daniel Levitt — photography
- Paul Logus — engineer, mixing
- Carlton Lynn — engineer
- Manny Marroquin — mixing, vocal mixing
- Vernon Mungo — engineer, mixing
- Rob Paustian — engineer, mixing
- Tara Podolsky — A&R
- Saint Denson — producer
- Keith Slattery — engineer
- Spi — multi instruments, producer, instrumentation
- Brian Stanley — engineer
- Christopher Stern — creative director
- Rabeka Tuinei — assistant
- Kevin Wales — producer
- Eric Weissman — sample clearance

== Charts ==
=== Weekly charts ===
Weekly chart performance for Hot & Wet
Chart (2004)	Peak position
Canadian R&B Albums (Nielsen SoundScan)	24
US Billboard 200	22
US Top R&B/Hip-Hop Albums (Billboard)	4

=== Year-end charts ===
Year-end chart performance for Hot & Wet
Chart (2004)	Position
US Top R&B/Hip-Hop Albums (Billboard)	60

== Release history ==
Release history for Hot & Wet
Region	Date	Format(s)	Label(s)
United States	December 9, 2003	CD; digital download	Bad Boy; Def Soul
