= Room 112 =

Studio album by 112
- Released: October 27, 1998
- Recorded: 1997–1998
- Genre: R&B; hip hop
- Length: 68:47
- Label: Bad Boy; Arista
- Producer: Sean Combs; Mario Winans; Stevie J; J-Dub; Younglord; Daron Jones; Leslie Braithwaite; Faith Evans; Bastiany; Jerome Dale; Scotty Beats; Arnold Hennings; Kris Kellow

112 chronology
112 (1996)	Room 112 (1998)	Part III (2001)

Singles from Room 112
- 1. "Love Me" Released: December 1, 1998; 2. "Anywhere" Released: January 28, 1999; 3. "Love You Like I Did" Released: June 23, 1999; 4. "Your Letter" Released: January 22, 2000

Room 112 is the second studio album by the American R&B quartet 112, released in 1998. The album features label mates Mase and Faith Evans; it also features Lil' Kim, Lil' Zane and MJG. The two singles, "Love Me", featuring Mase, and "Anywhere", featuring Lil' Zane, charted at number 17 and number 15 on the Billboard Hot 100, respectively.

== Reception ==
Professional ratings
Review scores
Source	Rating
AllMusic	2/5 stars
Entertainment Weekly	B

Entertainment Weekly wrote: "112 can't seem to decide whether they wanna woo the ladies or beat up on the competition. It's a choice that could make or break them in the future."

== Track listing ==
Credits adapted from the album's liner notes.

No.	Title	Writer(s)	Producer(s)	Length
1.	"Room 112" (Intro)	Jeffrey Walker; Daron Jones; Michael Keith; Quinnes Parker; Marvin Scandrick; Lamont Maxwell	J-Dub	1:00
2.	"So Much Love" (Interlude)	Steven Jordan; D. Jones; M. Keith; Q. Parker; M. Scandrick; L. Maxwell	Steven "Stevie J." Jordan	1:49
3.	"Be with You"	Sean Combs; Richard Frierson; D. Jones; M. Keith; Q. Parker; M. Scandrick; L. Maxwell; Courtney Sills; Jason Boyd	Sean "Puffy" Combs; Richard "Younglord" Frierson	4:05
4.	"Love Me" (featuring Mase)	Leslie Brathwaite; D. Jones; M. Keith; Q. Parker; M. Scandrick; L. Maxwell; Mason Betha; Luther Vandross	Leslie Brathwaite	4:17
5.	"The Only One" (featuring Lil' Kim)	D. Jones; M. Keith; Q. Parker; M. Scandrick; L. Maxwell; S. Combs; Kimberly Jones; Carl Thomas	Daron Jones; Sean "Puffy" Combs	4:25
6.	"Anywhere" (Interlude)	D. Jones; M. Keith; Q. Parker; M. Scandrick; L. Maxwell; J. Boyd	Daron Jones	1:11
7.	"Anywhere" (featuring Lil' Zane)	D. Jones; M. Keith; Q. Parker; M. Scandrick; L. Maxwell; Zane Copeland, Jr.	Daron Jones	4:04
8.	"Love You Like I Did"	D. Jones; M. Keith; Q. Parker; M. Scandrick; L. Maxwell	Daron Jones	4:19
9.	"For Awhile" (featuring Faith Evans)	J. Walker; Faith Evans; D. Jones; M. Keith; Q. Parker; M. Scandrick; L. Maxwell	J-Dub; Faith Evans	4:20
10.	"Don't Go Away" (Interlude)	S. Jordan; D. Jones; M. Keith; Q. Parker; M. Scandrick; L. Maxwell	Stevie J.	0:49
11.	"Stay with Me"	S. Combs; Mario Winans; D. Jones; M. Keith; Q. Parker; M. Scandrick; L. Maxwell; Shawn Colvin; John Leventhal	Sean "Puffy" Combs; Mario Winans	4:22
12.	"Whatcha Gonna Do" (featuring MJG)	S. Combs; M. Winans; D. Jones; M. Keith; Q. Parker; M. Scandrick; L. Maxwell; C. Sills; Kenneth Hickson; Marlon Goodwin	Sean "Puffy" Combs; Mario Winans	4:22
13.	"Crazy Over You"	D. Jones; M. Keith; Q. Parker; M. Scandrick; L. Maxwell; S. Combs; S. Jordan; M. Winans; C. Sills	Daron Jones; Sean "Puffy" Combs; Stevie J.; Mario Winans	5:21
14.	"Funny Feelings"	Jerome Leggette; Raymond Brown; Dwayne Bastiany; Eric Roberson	Jerome Dale; Scotty Beats; Dwayne Bastiany	3:51
15.	"Never Mind"	S. Jordan; Kelly Price; Clifton Chase; Cheryl Cook; Guy O'Brien; Sylvia Robinson; Michael Wright	Stevie J.	4:05
16.	"Someone to Hold"	Arnold Hennings; Gromyko Collins; D. Jones; M. Keith; Q. Parker; M. Scandrick; L. Maxwell	Arnold Hennings	4:05
17.	"All My Love"	A. Hennings; D. Jones; M. Keith; Q. Parker; M. Scandrick; L. Maxwell; C. Sills	Arnold Hennings	4:22
18.	"You Are the Only One" (Interlude)	S. Jordan; D. Jones; M. Keith; Q. Parker; M. Scandrick; L. Maxwell	Stevie J.	1:48
19.	"Your Letter"	Diane Warren; Kris Kellow	Kris Kellow	5:27
Total length:				68:47

Sample credits

- "Love Me" contains samples of "Don't You Know That?", written and performed by Luther Vandross.
- "Stay with Me" contains samples of "Sunny Came Home", written by Shawn Colvin and John Leventhal, and performed by Shawn Colvin.
- "Never Mind" contains samples of "8th Wonder", written by Clifton Chase, Cheryl Cook, Guy O'Brien, Sylvia Robinson and Michael Wright, and performed by Sugarhill Gang.

== Personnel ==
Credits adapted from the album's liner notes.

- 112 – vocals, arranger (tracks 3, 5, 7, 8, 11–13)
- "Prince Charles" Alexander – engineer (track 13), mixing (tracks 12, 16)
- Dwayne Bastiany – producer (track 14)
- Scotty Beats – producer (track 14)
- Chris Blanding – engineer (tracks 5, 7, 13)
- Ali Boudris – engineer and guitar (track 19)
- Leslie Brathwaite – producer and engineer (track 4)
- Josh Butler – engineer (track 14)
- Sean "Puffy" Combs – producer (tracks 3, 5, 11–13), executive producer
- Zane Copeland Jr. – rap (track 7)
- Lane Craven – mixing (track 4)
- Jerome Dale – producer (track 14)
- Stephen Dent – engineer (tracks 3, 11, 12, 15)
- Faith Evans – producer and featured artist (track 9)
- Richard "Younglord" Frierson – producer (track 3)
- Rasheed Goodlowe – assistant engineer (track 15)
- Mick Guzauski – mixing (track 19)
- Femi Gya – engineer (track 11)
- Arnold Hennings – producer (tracks 16, 17), all Indian instruments and keyboards (track 17)
- Anthony "Ty" Hudson – assistant engineer (track 4)
- J-Dub – producer (tracks 1, 9), strings (track 17)
- Daron Jones – producer (tracks 5–8, 13)
- Steven "Stevie J." Jordan – producer (tracks 2, 10, 13, 15, 18)
- Kris Kellow – producer, arranger, keyboards, and programming (track 19)
- Lil' Kim – featured artist (track 5)
- Ken Lewis – engineer (tracks 8, 9, 13)
- Paul Logus – mixing (tracks 3, 14, 15)
- Mario Luccy – engineer (track 19)
- Rico Lumpkins – engineer (track 16)
- Carlton Lynn – assistant engineer (track 4)
- Mase – featured artist (track 4)
- Tony Maserati – mixing (tracks 7, 13)
- MJG – featured artist (track 12)
- Lynn Montrose – assistant engineer (tracks 4, 12)
- Vernon J. Mungo – assistant engineer (track 3)
- Axel Niehaus – mixing (track 4)
- Jimmie Lee Patterson – assistant engineer (tracks 3, 5, 11, 13, 15)
- Michael Patterson – engineer (tracks 5, 11), mixing (tracks 1, 2, 5, 9, 11, 17)
- Joe Perrera – engineer (tracks 6, 10, 12, 13, 18), mixing (tracks 6, 8, 10, 18)
- Rob Paustian – engineer (track 3)
- Herb Powers – mastering
- Ed Raso – engineer (tracks 1–3, 13)
- Eric Roberson – arranger (track 14)
- Tom Russo – engineer (track 9)
- Tony Smalios – engineer (tracks 4, 9, 17)
- Brian Smith – engineer (track 3)
- Diane Warren – executive producer (track 19)
- Jason Webb – assistant engineer (track 16)
- Mike Wilson – engineer (track 5)
- Mario Winans – producer (tracks 11–13), overdubs (track 5)

== Charts ==
=== Weekly charts ===
Chart (1998)	Peak position
Canadian Albums (Billboard)	15
Canadian R&B Albums (Nielsen SoundScan)	3
UK Albums (OCC)	156
UK R&B Albums (OCC)	17
US Billboard 200	20
US Top R&B/Hip-Hop Albums (Billboard)	6

=== Year-end charts ===
Chart (1999)	Position
US Billboard 200	65
US Top R&B/Hip-Hop Albums (Billboard)	18

== Certifications ==
Region	Certification	Certified units/sales
United States (RIAA)	2× Platinum	2,000,000^{^}
^{^} Shipments figures based on certification alone.

== Release history ==
Region	Date	Label(s)	Format(s)	Catalog
United States	October 27, 1998	Bad Boy Records	CD; cassette	B0000039Q7
