= U Already Know =

Single by 112 featuring Foxy Brown

from the album Pleasure & Pain
- Released: November 23, 2004
- Recorded: 2004
- Genre: R&B; hip hop soul
- Label: Def Soul
- Songwriters: Q. Parker, M. Keith, M. Scandrick, S. Garrett, B. Edwards Jr., P. Ivers, J. Parker
- Producers: Focus..., Sean Garrett

112 singles chronology
| "Right Here for U" (2004) | "U Already Know" (2004) | "What If" (2005) |

Foxy Brown singles chronology
| "More or Less" (2004) | "U Already Know" (2005) | "Come Fly with Me" (2005) |

Music video
- "U Already Know" on YouTube

"U Already Know" is a R&B song recorded by American R&B band 112 for their fifth studio album Pleasure & Pain.

Slim and Q share lead vocals, with Daron providing ad libs at the end.

== Track listing ==
1. "U Already Know" (Radio Edit) — 3:16
2. "U Already Know" (Instrumental) — 3:16
3. "U Already Know" (Call Out) — 1:16

Official Remixes

1. "U Already Know" (Murder Remix featuring Ja Rule & Harry O)
2. "U Already Know" (Roc-A-Fella Remix featuring Foxy Brown)

== Charts ==
=== Weekly charts ===
| Chart (2005) | Peak position |
|---|---|
| US Billboard Hot 100 | 32 |
| US Hot R&B/Hip-Hop Songs (Billboard) | 3 |
| US Rhythmic Airplay (Billboard) | 34 |

=== Year-end charts ===
| Chart (2005) | Position |
|---|---|
| US Billboard Hot 100 | 97 |
| US Hot R&B/Hip-Hop Songs (Billboard) | 21 |
