= Germán Legarreta =

Puerto Rican actor

- Born: Germán Legarreta Quiles III; August 30, 1981 (age 43); San Juan, Puerto Rico
- Other names: Germán Quiles; German LeGarreta; Germán Legarreta Quiles
- Occupation: Actor
- Years active: 1988–present

Germán Legarreta (born August 30, 1981) is a Puerto Rican actor.

== Biography ==
=== Early life ===
Legarreta was born Germán Legarreta Quiles in San Juan, Puerto Rico; it did not take long for him to get his first big break—a commercial when he was just three years old. Throughout his formative years, he balanced a career as a successful child star and a competitive gymnast. Germán soon emerged as "someone to watch", and he and traveled to competitions throughout the United States, Europe and Central America.

=== Acting career ===
With roles on the Puerto Rican TV series, Ola nueva, La (1988) and Somos Unicos under his belt, at the age of 14, German beat out numerous other young stars for the role of "Freddy" in the hit theatrical release, Roller Kids. A role on Telemundo's popular TV series, Dame Un Break, soon followed, and German was recognized as a true teen star. While enjoying his newfound fame in Puerto Rico, he continued to hone his craft under the guidance of several prestigious acting coaches.

In 2001, German left Puerto Rico to pursue his dreams in Hollywood. Since arriving, he gave memorable performances in a variety of feature films: Chasing Papi (2003), Jail Bait (2004), The Only Word, as well as Showtime's critically acclaimed new cutting–edge drama series, Dexter (2006). Additionally, he has appeared in countless music videos alongside some of the industry's biggest names, including Mariah Carey, Fiona Apple, Pink, Jamie Foxx, Tweet, Fantasia, Britney Spears, Alanis Morissette, and Sade, among others.

Later this year, German returns to the big screen as the lead in the highly anticipated thriller, 7eventy 5ive (2007), a role that he believes "will have people talking."

== Filmography ==
=== Films ===
Year	Title	Role	Notes
2007	Dead tone	Shawn	
2007	Viva	Carlo/Carlos	
2007	Spin	Photographer	
2004	Jail Bait	Ricky	
2003	Chasing Papi	Guy at Festival	Uncredited
1995	Assassins	Kid in Plaza	Uncredited

=== Television ===
Year	Title	Role	No. of episodes
2007	Without a Trace	Hip Poker Player	1 episode
2006	Dexter	Juvenile Prisoner #1	1 episode
2006	Smith	DJ Marcos	1 episode
