= It's Over Now (112 song) =

2000 song by 112

Single by 112

from the album Part III
- Released: November 21, 2000
- Length: 4:25
- Label: Bad Boy Entertainment
- Songwriters: Daron Jones; Quinnes Parker; Melvin Glover; Sylvia Robinson
- Producer: Daron Jones

112 singles chronology
"Callin' Me" (2000)	"It's Over Now" (2000)	"Peaches & Cream" (2001)

Music video
- "It's Over Now" on YouTube

"It's Over Now" is the lead single from American R&B group 112's third studio album, Part III. It was released on November 21, 2000, and became their first number-one single on the US Billboard Hot R&B/Hip-Hop Singles & Tracks for two weeks. Daron Jones and Slim share lead vocals on the song.

The song contains an interpolation of Grandmaster Flash & The Furious Five's song "White Lines (Don't Don't Do It)", which was also used by the hip hop group Mobb Deep for their biggest hit "Quiet Storm" released over a year prior to "It's Over Now". The song itself was interpolated by English singer Ellie Goulding on the song "We Can't Move to This" from her third studio album, Delirium.

== Charts ==
=== Weekly charts ===
Weekly chart performance for "It's Over Now"
Chart (2001)	Peak position
Australia (ARIA)	88
Canada (Nielsen SoundScan)	5
France (SNEP)	99
Netherlands (Dutch Top 40 Tipparade)	3
Netherlands (Single Top 100)	54
Scotland Singles (OCC)	74
UK Singles (OCC)	22
UK Dance (OCC)	11
UK Hip Hop/R&B (OCC)	7
US Billboard Hot 100	6
US Hot R&B/Hip-Hop Songs (Billboard)	1
US Rhythmic Airplay (Billboard)	30

=== Year-end charts ===
Year-end chart performance for "It's Over Now"
Chart (2001)	Position
Canada (Nielsen SoundScan)	79
UK Urban (Music Week)	34
US Billboard Hot 100	68
US Hot R&B/Hip-Hop Singles & Tracks (Billboard)	15

== Release history ==
Region	Date	Format(s)	Label(s)	Ref.
United States	November 21, 2000	Rhythmic contemporary; urban radio	Bad Boy Entertainment	
Australia	April 2, 2001	CD	Bad Boy Entertainment; Arista; BMG	
United Kingdom	June 18, 2001	12-inch vinyl; CD; cassette	Bad Boy Entertainment; Arista; BMG	
