= Love Me (112 song) =

Single by 112 featuring Mase

from the album Room 112
- Released: December 1, 1998
- Genre: R&B; hip hop
- Length: 4:58
- Label: Bad Boy; Arista
- Songwriters: Daron Jones; Michael Keith, Marvin Scandrick; Quinnes Parker; Lamont "Stro" Maxwell; Mason Betha; Luther Vandross; Leslie Brathwaite
- Producer: Leslie Brathwaite

112 singles chronology
"Sky's the Limit" (1997)	"Love Me" (1998)	"Anywhere" (1999)

"Love Me" is the lead single from American R&B group 112 from their second studio album, Room 112 and features vocals from rapper Mase. Q and Mike share lead vocals on the song, with Slim providing adlibs. It peaked at number 17 on the US Billboard Hot 100, and reached number eight on the Hot R&B/Hip-Hop Singles & Tracks chart. A music video directed by Frosty for the song was made, featuring the group and Mase performing in a white background. The song contains a sample of the 1981 record, "Don't You Know That?" by recording artist Luther Vandross from his debut album, Never Too Much. In the song, Mase takes a supposed shot at rapper Jay-Z on this song with the line "What we hear is platinum that, platinum this/Platinum whips, nobody got no platinum hits".

== Formats and track listing ==
- Australia CD single
  - 1. "Love Me" (Radio Mix) – 4:20
  - 2. "Love Me" (Instrumental) – 4:20
  - 3. "Only You" (Bad Boy Remix) – 4:49
  US 12" (Promo)
  - A1. "Love Me" (Radio Mix) – 4:20
  - A2. "Love Me" (Instrumental) – 4:20
  - A3. "Love Me" (Acappella) – 4:20
  - B1. "Love Me" (Radio Mix) – 4:20
  - B2. "Love Me" (Instrumental) – 4:20
  - B3. "Love Me" (Acappella) – 4:20
  US CD single
  - 1. "Love Me" (Radio Mix) – 4:20
  - 2. "Love Me" (Instrumental) – 4:20
  US CD single (Promo)
  - 1. "Love Me" (Radio Mix) – 4:20
  - 2. "Love Me" (Call Out Research Hook) – 0:10

== Charts ==
=== Weekly charts ===
Chart performance for "Love Me"
Chart (1998)	Peak position
Australia (ARIA)	67
Canada (Nielsen SoundScan)	17
New Zealand (Recorded Music NZ)	33
UK Singles (OCC)	196
UK Hip Hop/R&B (OCC)	38
US Billboard Hot 100	17
US Hot R&B/Hip-Hop Songs (Billboard)	8
US Rhythmic Airplay (Billboard)	32

=== Year-end charts ===
Chart (1998)	Position
UK Urban (Music Week)	34

== Certifications ==
Region	Certification	Certified units/sales
United States (RIAA)	Gold	500,000^{^}
^{^} Shipments figures based on certification alone.
