= Q, Mike, Slim, Daron =

Studio album by 112
- Released: October 27, 2017
- Length: 48:03
- Label: E1
- Producer: Joshua Bush; Brian Casey; Brandon Casey; Bryan-Michael Cox; Marcus Devine; Edimah; Blac Elvis; The Exclusives; Ken "K-Fam" Fambro; Aljamaal Jones; Daron Jones; MelloTheProducer

112 chronology
Pleasure & Pain (2005)	Q, Mike, Slim, Daron (2017)	Forever (2020)

Q, Mike, Slim, Daron is the sixth studio album by American band 112. It was released by E1 on October 27, 2017. Their debut with the label, it reached number 10 on the US Top Independent Albums chart.

== Critical reception ==
Justin Kantor from SoulTracks found that "on the aptly titled Q, Mike, Slim, Daron, [112] aim to remind listeners of their trademark meshing of grooves for the streets and between the sheets. While they miss the mark a few times coming out of starting gate on several drab numbers filled with clichéd lyrics and vacuous arrangements, they manage to solidify the course throughout most of the CD’s following selections – if not exactly with the same spontaneity and edge that they once possessed."

== Track listing ==
Q, Mike, Slim, Daron track listing
No.	Title	Writer(s)	Producer(s)	Length
1.	"Intro"	Daron Jones; Marcus Devine; Marvin Scandrick; Michael Keith; Quinnes Parker	Devine	1:02
2.	"Come Over"	Jones; Scandrick; Keith; Parker; Ralph Jeanty; Sean McMillion	MelloTheProducer; The Exclusives	3:25
3.	"Without You"	Aljamaal Jones; D. Jones; Elvis Williams; Scandrick; Keith; Parker; Rafael Dewayne Ishman; Stephen M. Fisher	Blac Elvis	4:03
4.	"Dangerous Games"	A. Jones; D. Jones; Dimitri A. McDowell; E. Williams; Scandrick; Keith; Parker; Ishman; Fisher	D. Jones	4:03
5.	"Both of Us" (featuring Jagged Edge)	Brandon Casey; Brian Casey; Scandrick; Keith; Parker	Brandon Casey; Brian Casey; Bryan-Michael Cox	3:39
6.	"True Colors"	Corey A. Thomas; D. Jones; Scandrick; Keith; Parker	Ken "K-Fam" Fambro	3:46
7.	"112/Faith Evans Interlude" (featuring Faith Evans)	D. Jones; Devine; Scandrick; Keith; Parker	Devine	1:30
8.	"Wanna Be"	D. Jones; Devine; Scandrick; Keith; Parker	Devine	3:29
9.	"Still Got It"	A. Jones; Anthony "Ant" Smith; D. Jones; E. Williams; Scandrick; Keith; Parker; Ishman	Blac Elvis	3:23
10.	"Lucky"	A. Jones; D. Jones; Joshua Bush; Scandrick; Keith	Blac Elvis; Bush	3:41
11.	"1's for Ya"	A. Jones; Smith; D. Jones; E. Williams; Scandrick; Keith; Parker	Blac Elvis; A. Jones	3:07
12.	"Thank You Interlude"	Alvin Demetri Sharpe	Fambro	1:23
13.	"Simple & Plain"	A. Jones; D. Jones; E. Williams; Scandrick; Keith; Parker; Ishman	Blac Elvis	4:00
14.	"My Love"	Amir Cuyler; D. Jones; Gregory Reid; Scandrick; Keith; Parker; Ralph Jeanty; Sean McMillion; Terence Williams	Edimah; The Exclusives	4:20
15.	"Residue"	D. Jones; Devine; Scandrick; Keith; Parker	Devine	3:07

== Charts ==
Chart performance for Q, Mike, Slim, Daron
Chart (2017)	Peak position
US Billboard 200	106
US Independent Albums (Billboard)	10
US Top R&B Albums (Billboard)	14
