= Dance with Me (112 song) =

2001 single by 112

Single by 112

from the album Part III
- Released: July 17, 2001
- Studio: Doppler (Atlanta, Georgia)
- Length: 4:01 (album version); 3:17 (radio edit)
- Label: Bad Boy Entertainment; BMG
- Songwriters: Daron Jones; Jason "Poo Bear" Boyd; Quinnes Parker; Michael Keith; Marvin Scandrick
- Producer: Daron Jones

112 singles chronology
"Peaches & Cream" (2001)	"Dance with Me" (2001)	"Hey Luv (Anything)" (2002)

"Dance with Me" is a song by American R&B group 112, released as the third and final single from their third studio album, Part III (2001), in July 2001. The released version features rap artist Beanie Sigel and is included on the Bad Boy Entertainment album We Invented the Remix. The song peaked at number 39 on the US Billboard Hot 100 and became a platinum-selling hit in Australia and Belgium, reaching number two in Australia, number one in Flanders, and number nine in Wallonia.

== Track listings ==
US 12-inch single

A1. "Dance with Me" (extended version) – 4:27
A2. "Dance with Me" (instrumental) – 4:27
B1. "Dance with Me" (radio edit) – 4:00
B2. "Dance with Me" (acappella) – 4:25

European CD single

1. "Dance with Me" (radio edit) – 3:17
2. "Dance with Me" (album version) – 4:01

Australian CD single

1. "Dance with Me" (radio edit) – 3:17
2. "Dance with Me" (album version) – 4:01
3. "Dance with Me" (remix radio mix featuring Beanie Sigel) – 4:03
4. "Dance with Me" (remix club mix featuring Beanie Sigel) – 5:00

== Charts ==
=== Weekly charts ===
Chart (2001–2002)	Peak position
Australia (ARIA)	2
Australian Urban (ARIA)	1
Belgium (Ultratop 50 Flanders)	1
Belgium (Ultratop 50 Wallonia)	9
Romania (Romanian Top 100)	18
US Billboard Hot 100	39
US Hot R&B/Hip-Hop Songs (Billboard)	20
US Rhythmic Airplay (Billboard)	6

=== Year-end charts ===
Chart (2001)	Position
US Hot R&B/Hip-Hop Singles & Tracks (Billboard)	82
US Rhythmic Top 40 (Billboard)	57

Chart (2002)	Position
Australia (ARIA)	30
Australian Urban (ARIA)	9
Belgium (Ultratop 50 Flanders)	4
Belgium (Ultratop 50 Wallonia)	40
US Rhythmic Top 40 (Billboard)	65

== Certifications ==
Region	Certification	Certified units/sales
Australia (ARIA)	Platinum	70,000^{^}
Belgium (BRMA)	Platinum	50,000^{*}
New Zealand (RMNZ)	Gold	15,000^{‡}
^{*} Sales figures based on certification alone.^{^} Shipments figures based on certification alone.^{‡} Sales+streaming figures based on certification alone.

== Release history ==
Region	Date	Format(s)	Label(s)	Ref.
United States	July 17, 2001	Urban radio	Bad Boy	
Australia	February 11, 2002	CD	Bad Boy; BMG	

== Cover versions ==
- Saint featuring M.D.P. released a cover of "Dance with Me" in 2007. A remix of Saint's version, by the DJ duo Houseshaker, was a club hit in Brazil in 2008.
- Lexington Bridge released a cover in 2008.
- In June 2022, English boy band Blue released their version as the second single from their sixth studio album Heart and Soul.
