= J'Adore (magazine) =

J'Adore is a Romanian language free shopping magazine published since 2004 in Cluj-Napoca, Romania, featuring local shopping interest. The magazine is published on a monthly basis. In 2006, Caţavencu Group acquired the magazine and launched a franchise Bucharest version of the magazine in 2007.
