= Anywhere (112 song) =

Single by 112 featuring Lil' Zane

from the album Room 112 and Young World: The Future
- Released: January 28, 1999
- Recorded: 1998
- Genre: R&B; hip hop
- Length: 4:18
- Label: Bad Boy; Arista
- Songwriters: Daron Jones; Michael Keith; Marvin Scandrick; Quinnes Parker; Lamont "Stro" Maxwell; Zane Copeland, Jr.
- Producer: Daron Jones

112 singles chronology
"Love Me" (1998)	"Anywhere" (1999)	"Love You Like I Did" (1999)

Lil' Zane singles chronology
"Anywhere" (1999)	"Money Stretch" (1999)

"Anywhere" is the second single from R&B group 112 from their 1998 album, Room 112. Q and Slim share lead vocals and the song features Lil' Zane.

== Charts ==
=== Weekly charts ===
Chart (1999)	Peak position
Australia (ARIA)	96
New Zealand (Recorded Music NZ)	36
US Billboard Hot 100	15
US Hot R&B/Hip-Hop Songs (Billboard)	5
US Rhythmic Airplay (Billboard)	2

=== Year-end charts ===
Chart (1999)	Position
US Billboard Hot 100	47
