= 112 (album) =

Studio album by 112
- Released: August 27, 1996
- Recorded: 1995–1996
- Genres: R&B; hip hop soul
- Length: 73:18
- Labels: Bad Boy; Arista
- Producers: Sean "Puffy" Combs; Stevie J.; Tim & Bob; Wanya Morris; Daron Jones; Al B Sure!; Kyle West; Nashiem Myrick; Carlos Broady; Arnold Hennings; Alex Richbourg

112 chronology
112 (1996)	Room 112 (1998)

Singles from 112
- 1. "Only You" Released: May 13, 1996; 2. "Only You (Bad Boy Remix)" Released: July 8, 1996; 3. "Come See Me" Released: October 21, 1996; 4. "Cupid" Released: May 16, 1997

112 is the debut album from the American R&B group 112. It was released on August 27, 1996, as one of the first R&B records on Sean Combs' Bad Boy label. The majority of the album was produced primarily by Combs, Tim & Bob and one of the first Hitmen, Stevie J. It also included contributions from group member Daron Jones, Al B Sure!, Kyle West, Arnold Hennings and Boyz II Men vocalist Wanya Morris. The album features label mates the late The Notorious B.I.G., Mase and Faith Evans. Three singles were released from the album: "Only You", "Come See Me" and "Cupid". All of the singles had music videos released.

== Background ==
Originally known as Forte while in high school and still in their teens, the quartet enlisted the professional management services of Courtney Sills and Kevin Wales. Named after the Atlanta-based club 112, the group performed there in front of singers Faith Evans and Usher along with Bad Boy founder Sean Combs. After their performance, the group became the second R&B act signed to Bad Boy behind Faith Evans, who – along with producer Chucky Thompson – recommended Combs to sign them.

According to 112 member and producer Daron Jones, the group Boyz II Men was a primary influence on their debut. The reason for their influence was due to them accepting several songs produced by Tim Kelley & Bob Robinson that were initially planned for inclusion on Boyz II Men's second album II. Producer Bob Robinson revealed that Boyz II Men wanted Tim & Bob to produce the majority of II, but Motown Records president Jheryl Busby felt uncomfortable with unknown producers helming a project by a group that was the biggest act in the world at the time. Busby then sought out productions from more established names and as a result, Kelley & Robinson's songs – notably "Now That We're Done" and "Can I Touch You" – were later given to 112 for their album. Jones felt inconfident about his lead vocals while recording "Now That We're Done" and was surprised at the reaction to his performance. Singer Brandy – who was there with the song's co-writer Wanya Morris – caught Jones off-guard when she asked him to teach her how to do the riffs and runs she heard from him.

Producer Stevie J was brought into the project fresh off from his touring with Jodeci and appearing on their 1995 album The Show, The After Party, The Hotel. Stevie served as a mentor to Jones, who expressed a desire to become a songwriter and producer. The first single from 112 - "Only You" - was hated by the group because of the restrained vocals, which they felt wasn't the best song to showcase their singing. According to Jones, they initially wanted "Now That We're Done" released as the first single and the only thing that made them like "Only You" was the remix - which was also included on the album. They quickly dismissed the song and felt it wasn't going to be successful. The song about which they were indifferent became a breakout hit for them.

Another single "Cupid" was primarily inspired by Babyface. The group wanted the songwriter/producer to work on their debut, but financial issues and budget constraints prevented him from working on the album. Jones then felt he could write a "Babyface" type of song and later worked with Dallas Austin protégé Arnold Hennings on producing it. Al B. Sure! and Dave Hollister were called in to work on the album as well. While none of Hollister's songs made the final track listing, one of Sure!'s contributions "Erase The Day" was left off while his other contribution "This Is Your Day" was included on the album. The group started recording in February 1995 and finished the album in January 1996.

== Critical reception ==
Professional ratings
Review scores
Source	Rating
AllMusic	4/5 stars
The Source	(favorable)

Leo Stanley of AllMusic wrote: "112 have strong voices, and their smooth harmonies are quite seductive, making the lack of originality in their music easy to overlook."

== Track listing ==
Songwriting credits and track listing adapted from liner notes.

No.	Title	Writer(s)	Producer(s)	Length
1.	"112 Intro"	Steven Jordan; Daron Jones; Michael Keith; Marvin Scandrick; Quinnes Parker	Stevie J.	2:12
2.	"Now That We're Done"	Tim Kelley; Bob Robinson; Wanya Morris	Tim & Bob; Wanya Morris	5:09
3.	"Pleasure & Pain"	S. Jordan; Sean Combs; D. Jones; M. Keith; M. Scandrick; Q. Parker; Lamont Maxwell	Stevie J.; Sean "Puffy" Combs; Daron Jones	4:17
4.	"Why" (Interlude)	T. Kelley; B. Robinson; D. Jones; Courtney Sills; M. Scandrick; M. Keith; Q. Parker	Tim & Bob	1:43
5.	"Cupid"	Arnold Hennings; C. Sills; D. Jones; M. Keith; M. Scandrick; Q. Parker	Arnold Hennings; Daron Jones	4:12
6.	"Call My Name"	Alex Richbourg; S. Combs; Burt Bacharach; Hal David	Alex Richbourg; Sean "Puffy" Combs	4:04
7.	"Come See Me" (featuring Mr. Cheeks)	T. Kelley; B. Robinson; S. Combs; Terrance Kelly	Tim & Bob	4:25
8.	"Sexy You" (Interlude)	Kevin Wales; S. Jordan; D. Jones	Stevie J.	1:50
9.	"Can I Touch You"	T. Kelley; B. Robinson; W. Morris	Tim & Bob; Wanya Morris^{[a]}	5:05
10.	"I Can't Believe" (featuring Faith Evans)	S. Combs; S. Jordan; D. Jones; M. Keith; M. Scandrick; Q. Parker; C. Sills	Sean "Puffy" Combs; Stevie J.	5:32
11.	"Keep It Real" (Interlude)	D. Jones; M. Keith; M. Scandrick; Q. Parker; K. Wales	Tim & Bob; Daron Jones	2:39
12.	"Only You (Bad Boy Remix)" (featuring The Notorious B.I.G. & Mase)	S. Combs; S. Jordan; Christopher Wallace; Mason Betha; D. Jones; M. Keith; M. Scandrick; Q. Parker; DJ Rogers, Jr.; Harry Wayne Casey; Richard Finch	Sean "Puffy" Combs; Stevie J.	4:49
13.	"I Will Be There"	D. Jones; S. Jordan; M. Keith; M. Scandrick; Q. Parker	Daron Jones; Stevie J.	4:47
14.	"In Love With You"	S. Combs; S. Jordan; D. Jones; M. Keith; M. Scandrick; Q. Parker; David Porter	Sean "Puffy" Combs; Stevie J.	4:33
15.	"Just a Little While"	T. Kelley; B. Robinson	Tim & Bob	3:48
16.	"Why Does"	S. Combs; S. Jordan; D. Jones; M. Keith; M. Scandrick; Q. Parker; C. Sills	Sean "Puffy" Combs; Stevie J.	4:34
17.	"This Is Your Day"	Albert Brown; Kyle West; Edmund Clement	Al B. Sure!; Kyle West	4:47
18.	"Throw It All Away"	A. Hennings; S. Combs; D. Jones; M. Keith; M. Scandrick; Q. Parker	Daron Jones; Arnold Hennings; Sean "Puffy" Combs^{[a]}; Stevie J.^{[a]}	4:51
19.	"Only You (Clean Radio Mix)" (featuring The Notorious B.I.G.)	S. Combs; S. Jordan; C. Wallace; D. Jones; M. Keith; M. Scandrick; Q. Parker; DJ Rogers, Jr.; H.W. Casey; R. Finch	Sean "Puffy" Combs; Stevie J.	4:21

Notes

- ^{^[a]} signifies a co-producer

Sample credits

- "Call My Name" contains samples of "Walk On By", written by Burt Bacharach and Hal David, and performed by Isaac Hayes.
- "Only You" contains samples of "I Get Lifted", written by Harry Wayne Casey and Richard Finch, and performed by KC and the Sunshine Band.
- "In Love With You" contains samples of "Blind Alley", written by David Porter, and performed by The Emotions.

== Personnel ==
Adapted from the album's liner notes.

- Al B. Sure! – producer, vocal arranger, engineer, and mixing (track 17)
- "Prince" Charles Alexander – mixing (track 19)
- Deric Angelettie – additional programming (track 14)
- Dan Beroff – assistant engineer (track 17)
- Carlos Broady – remixing (track 12)
- Mr. Cheeks – rap (track 7)
- Sean "Puffy" Combs – producer (tracks 3, 6, 10, 12, 14, 16, 19), co-producer (track 18), remixing (track 12), executive producer
- Lane Craven – engineer (tracks 1, 8, 9, 12, 16), mixing (tracks 1, 8, 14, 16, 19)
- Stephen Dent – 2nd engineer (tracks 3, 7, 10, 13)
- Bill Esses – engineer (track 16)
- Faith Evans – featured vocals (track 10)
- Rasheed Goodlowe – 2nd engineer (tracks 8, 12, 19)
- Arnold Hennings – producer (tracks 5, 18)
- Daron Jones – vocals, producer (tracks 3, 5, 11, 13, 18), piano (track 8)
- Steven "Stevie J." Jordan – producer (tracks 1, 3, 8, 10, 12-14, 16, 19), co-producer (track 18), remixing (track 12)
- Michael Keith – vocals
- Tim Kelley – producer (tracks 2, 4, 7, 9, 11, 15); engineer (tracks 2, 4, 11, 15); mixing (tracks 2, 4, 7, 9, 15); keyboards, drums, and bass (track 9)
- Paul Logus – engineer (tracks 9, 10), mixing (track 12)
- Chauncey Mahan – engineer (track 19)
- Mase – rap (track 12)
- Tony Maserati – engineer (tracks 10, 19), mixing (tracks 3, 10, 18)
- Wanya Morris – producer (track 2), co-producer (track 9)
- Nashiem Myrick – remixing (track 12)
- Axel Niehaus – engineer (tracks 3, 6, 7, 9, 10, 13, 14), mixing (tracks 6, 13)
- The Notorious B.I.G. – rap (tracks 12, 19)
- Quinnes "Q" Parker – vocals
- Michael Patterson – engineer (tracks 5, 18), mixing (track 5)
- Herb Powers – mastering
- Kelly Price – background vocals (track 14)
- Darin Prindle – engineer (tracks 2, 4, 11, 15), mixing (tracks 2, 4, 7, 9, 15)
- Alex Richbourg – producer (track 6)
- Bob Robinson – producer (tracks 2, 4, 7, 9, 11, 15), engineer (tracks 2, 4, 11, 15), mixing (tracks 2, 4, 7, 9, 15), acoustic piano and keyboards (track 9)
- Marvin Scandrick – vocals
- Kyle West – producer (track 17)
- Doug A. Wilson – mixing (track 11), 2nd engineer (tracks 1, 5, 6, 12)

== Charts ==
=== Weekly charts ===
Chart (1996)	Peak position
Canada Top Albums/CDs (RPM)	17
US Billboard 200	37
US Top R&B/Hip-Hop Albums (Billboard)	5

=== Year-end charts ===
Chart (1996)	Position
US Top R&B/Hip-Hop Albums (Billboard)	64
Chart (1997)	Position
US Billboard 200	114
US Top R&B/Hip-Hop Albums (Billboard)	37

== Certifications ==
Region	Certification	Certified units/sales
Canada (Music Canada)	Platinum	100,000^{^}
United States (RIAA)	2× Platinum	2,000,000^{^}
^{^} Shipments figures based on certification alone.

== Release history ==
Region	Date	Label(s)	Format(s)	Catalog
United States	August 27, 1996	Bad Boy Records	Cassette; CD; Vinyl	B0000039Q7
