= Peaches & Cream (112 song) =

2001 single by 112

Single by 112

from the album Part III
- B-side: "Dance with Me"
- Released: March 13, 2001
- Studio: Daddy's House (New York City)
- Length: 3:13 (album version); 3:51 (radio remix)
- Label: Bad Boy Entertainment
- Songwriters: Daron Jones; Michael Keith; Marvin Scandrick; Quinnes Parker; Sean Combs; Mario Winans; Jason "Poo Bear" Boyd; Aljamaal Jones; Courtney Sills
- Producers: Mario Winans; Sean "P. Diddy" Combs

112 singles chronology
"It's Over Now" (2000)	"Peaches & Cream" (2001)	"Dance with Me" (2001)

Music video
- "Peaches & Cream" on YouTube

"Peaches & Cream" is a song by American R&B quartet 112. Bad Boy Entertainment released the song on March 13, 2001, as the second single from their third studio album, Part III. Slim and Q share lead vocals with Mike performing the rap verse. The song peaked at number two on the US Billboard Hot R&B/Hip-Hop Singles & Tracks chart, reached number four on the Billboard Hot 100, and entered the top 40 in Australia and the United Kingdom.

"Peaches & Cream" was nominated for Best R&B Performance by a Duo or Group with Vocal at the 44th Grammy Awards in 2002. The group performed the song as part to commemorate Bad Boy Entertainment's 20th anniversary as a record label at the BET Awards 2015.

== Track listing ==
1. "Peaches & Cream" – 3:13
2. "Dance with Me" – 3:43

== Charts ==
=== Weekly charts ===
Chart (2001)	Peak position
Australia (ARIA)	24
Australian Urban (ARIA)	10
Netherlands (Dutch Top 40 Tipparade)	6
Netherlands (Single Top 100)	67
Scotland Singles (OCC)	59
UK Singles (OCC)	32
UK Dance (OCC)	5
UK Hip Hop/R&B (OCC)	7
US Billboard Hot 100	4
US Hot R&B/Hip-Hop Songs (Billboard)	2
US Pop Airplay (Billboard)	16
US Rhythmic Airplay (Billboard)	1
US Top 40 Tracks (Billboard)	12

=== Year-end charts ===
Chart (2001)	Position
US Billboard Hot 100	20
US Hot R&B/Hip-Hop Singles & Tracks (Billboard)	7
US Mainstream Top 40 (Billboard)	60
US Rhythmic Top 40 (Billboard)	5
US Top 40 Tracks (Billboard)	34

== Certifications ==
Region	Certification	Certified units/sales
New Zealand (RMNZ)	Gold	15,000^{‡}
United Kingdom (BPI)	Silver	200,000^{‡}
^{‡} Sales+streaming figures based on certification alone.

== Release history ==
Region	Date	Format(s)	Label(s)	Ref.
United States	March 13, 2001	Rhythmic contemporary; urban radio	Bad Boy Entertainment	
United States	May 22, 2001	Contemporary hit radio	Bad Boy Entertainment	
United Kingdom	August 27, 2001	12-inch vinyl; CD	Bad Boy Entertainment; Arista; BMG	
Australia	September 17, 2001	CD	Bad Boy Entertainment; Arista; BMG	

== See also ==
- List of Billboard Rhythmic number-one songs of the 2000s
