= Only You (112 song) =

Single by 112 featuring The Notorious B.I.G. and Mase

from the album 112
- Released: May 10, 1996
- Recorded: November 1995
- Genre: R&B; hip hop
- Length: 4:18 (Clean Radio Mix); 4:50 (Bad Boy Remix)
- Label: Bad Boy; Arista
- Songwriters: Sean Combs; Steven Jordan; Christopher Wallace; Mason Betha; D.J. Rogers Jr.; Marvin Scandrick; Michael Keith; Daron Jones; Quinnes Parker; Harry Wayne Casey; Richard Finch
- Producers: Stevie J; Puff Daddy

112 singles chronology
"Only You" (1996)	"Come See Me" (1996)

The Notorious B.I.G. singles chronology
"Get Money" (1996)	"Only You" (1996)	"You Can't Stop the Reign" (1996)

Mase singles chronology
"Only You (Bad Boy Remix)" (1996)	"Can't Nobody Hold Me Down" (1997)

Music video
- "Only You" on YouTube

"Only You" is the debut single by R&B group 112, from their 1996 self-titled debut album released by Bad Boy Records. Both the original and the remix were released as singles, in May and July 1996 respectively. Q, Slim, and Mike share lead vocals on both versions of the song. The original features The Notorious B.I.G., and the remix features both B.I.G. and Mase. The original samples the riff from "I Get Lifted" by KC and the Sunshine Band.

The Stevie J and Sean Combs produced song reached number one on two of Billboard's charts: Hot Dance Singles Sales and Hot R&B/Hip-Hop Airplay. The song made its debut at number thirteen on the Billboard Hot 100 on July 27, 1996, spending 39 weeks total on the chart.

The group performed the song during their guest appearances on the UPN sitcom Moesha, appearing in the episodes "Friends" (1996) and "The List" (1996).

== Music video ==
The music video was directed by Hype Williams and shot in the heart of Times Square. It features 112, Notorious B.I.G., Puff Daddy, and newly signed Bad Boy artist at the time, Mase, rapping in front of a crowd. Cameos are made by Lil' Cease, Stevie J, and Keisha from Total.

== Charts ==
=== Weekly charts ===
Chart (1996)	Peak position
Australia (ARIA)	53
Canada (Nielsen SoundScan)	18
New Zealand (Recorded Music NZ)	43
US Billboard Hot 100	13
US Dance Singles Sales (Billboard)	1
US Hot R&B/Hip-Hop Songs (Billboard)	3
US Rhythmic Airplay (Billboard)	13

=== Year-end charts ===
Chart (1996)	Position
US Billboard Hot 100	34
US Hot R&B/Hip-Hop Songs (Billboard)	7

== Certifications ==
Region	Certification	Certified units/sales
New Zealand (RMNZ)	Platinum	30,000^{‡}
United Kingdom (BPI)	Silver	200,000^{‡}
United States (RIAA)	Gold	500,000
^{‡} Sales+streaming figures based on certification alone.
