= Billboard Year-End Hot R&B/Hip-Hop Singles & Tracks of 2000 =

This is a list of Billboard magazine's Top Hot R&B/Hip-Hop Singles & Tracks of 2000.

No.	Title	Artist(s)
1	"Let's Get Married"	Jagged Edge
2	"I Wanna Know"	Joe
3	"Incomplete"	Sisqó
4	"Hot Boyz"	Missy Elliott featuring Nas, Eve and Q-Tip
5	"U Know What's Up"	Donell Jones featuring Lisa Lopes
6	"Get It On Tonite"	Montell Jordan
7	"No More"	Ruff Endz
8	"I Wish"	Carl Thomas
9	"Separated"	Avant
10	"Where I Wanna Be"	Donell Jones
11	"Say My Name"	Destiny's Child
12	"Bag Lady"	Erykah Badu
13	"Thong Song"	Sisqó
14	"Wifey"	Next
15	"Maria Maria"	Santana featuring the Product G&B
16	"He Wasn't Man Enough"	Toni Braxton
17	"He Can't Love U"	Jagged Edge
18	"Try Again"	Aaliyah
19	"Country Grammar (Hot Shit)"	Nelly
20	"Shake Ya Ass"	Mystikal
21	"Untitled (How Does It Feel)"	D'Angelo
22	"Bounce with Me"	Lil' Bow Wow featuring Xscape
23	"Liar"	Profyle
24	"Just Be a Man About It"	Toni Braxton
25	"I Don't Wanna"	Aaliyah
26	"24/7"	Kevon Edmonds
27	"Dance Tonight"	Lucy Pearl
28	"Thank God I Found You"	Mariah Carey featuring Joe and 98 Degrees
29	"Doesn't Really Matter"	Janet Jackson
30	"Party Up (Up in Here)"	DMX
31	"Open My Heart"	Yolanda Adams
32	"Shackles (Praise You)"	Mary Mary
33	"One Night Stand"	J-Shin featuring LaTocha
34	"I Like It"	Sammie
35	"What'chu Like"	Da Brat featuring Tyrese
36	"Treat Her Like a Lady"	Joe
37	"Wobble Wobble"	504 Boyz
38	"Big Pimpin'"	Jay-Z featuring UGK
39	"Jumpin', Jumpin'"	Destiny's Child
40	"The Light"	Common
41	"No More Rain (In This Cloud)"	Angie Stone
42	"Whatever"	Ideal
43	"If You Love Me"	Mint Condition
44	"What These Bitches Want"	DMX featuring Sisqó
45	"Whoa!"	Black Rob
46	"Your Child"	Mary J. Blige
47	"Between Me and You"	Ja Rule featuring Christina Milian
48	"You Owe Me"	Nas
49	"The Next Episode"	Dr. Dre featuring Snoop Dogg
50	"Get Gone"	Ideal
51	"Callin' Me"	Lil' Zane featuring 112
52	"I Wish"	R. Kelly
53	"Forgot About Dre"	Dr. Dre featuring Eminem
54	"None of Ur Friends Business"	Ginuwine
55	"Back at One"	Brian McKnight
56	"Got to Get It"	Sisqó featuring Make It Hot
57	"Love Is Blind"	Eve
58	"Dancin'"	Guy
59	"The Best of Me"	Mya
60	"That's What I'm Looking For"	Da Brat
61	"The Best Man I Can Be"	Ginuwine, RL, Tyrese and Case
62	"Bad Boyz"	Shyne featuring Barrington Levy
63	"Bring It All to Me"	Blaque featuring *NSYNC
64	"Same Script, Different Cast"	Whitney Houston and Deborah Cox
65	"Spend My Life with You"	Eric Benét featuring Tamia
66	"The Real Slim Shady"	Eminem
67	"Deep Inside"	Mary J. Blige
68	"What's Your Fantasy"	Ludacris featuring Shawnna
69	"As We Lay"	Kelly Price
70	"Left, Right, Left"	Drama
71	"Back That Azz Up"	B.G. featuring Hot Boys and Big Tymers
72	"Summer Rain"	Carl Thomas
73	"911"	Wyclef Jean featuring Mary J. Blige
74	"No Matter What They Say"	Lil' Kim
75	"G'd Up"	Tha Eastsidaz featuring Butch Cassidy
76	"It's So Hard"	Big Pun featuring Donell Jones
77	"Caught Out There"	Kelis
78	"Whistle While You Twurk"	Ying Yang Twins
79	"Hey Papi"	Jay-Z featuring Amil and Memphis Bleek
80	"I Need a Hot Girl"	Hot Boys
81	"Independent Women Part I"	Destiny's Child
82	"I Learned from the Best"	Whitney Houston
83	"You Can Do It"	Ice Cube featuring Mack 10 and Ms. Toi
84	"Do It Again (Put Ya Hands Up)"	Jay-Z featuring Amil and Beanie Sigel
85	"Can't Stay"	Dave Hollister
86	"There You Go"	Pink
87	"Case of the Ex"	Mya
88	"That Other Woman"	Changing Faces
89	"Girls Dem Sugar"	Beenie Man featuring Mya
90	"What's My Name?"	DMX
91	"Mr. Too Damn Good"	Gerald Levert
92	"Breathe and Stop"	Q-Tip
93	"You Should've Told Me"	Kelly Price
94	"15 Minutes"	Marc Nelson
95	"4, 5, 6"	Solé featuring JT Money and Kandi
96	"Tha Block Is Hot"	Lil Wayne featuring Juvenile and B.G.
97	"We Can't Be Friends"	Deborah Cox and RL
98	"Get Your Roll On"	Big Tymers
99	"Shut Up"	Trick Daddy featuring Deuce Poppito, Trina and C.O.
100	"No Love (I'm Not Used to)"	Kevon Edmonds

== See also ==
- 2000 in music
- Billboard Year-End Hot 100 singles of 2000
- Billboard Year-End Hot Rap Singles of 2000
- List of Hot R&B/Hip-Hop Singles & Tracks number ones of 2000
