= Billboard Year-End Hot Rap Singles of 2000 =

American music chart

This is a list of Billboard magazine's Top Hot Rap Singles of 2000.

| No. | Title | Artist(s) |
|---|---|---|
| 1 | "Hot Boyz" | Missy Elliott featuring Eve, Nas and Q-Tip |
| 2 | "4, 5, 6" | Solé featuring JT Money and Kandi |
| 3 | "Wobble Wobble" | 504 Boyz |
| 4 | "Whistle While You Twurk" | Ying Yang Twins |
| 5 | "Country Grammar (Hot Shit)" | Nelly |
| 6 | "Callin' Me" | Lil Zane featuring 112 |
| 7 | "You Can Do It" | Ice Cube featuring Mack 10 and Ms. Toi |
| 8 | "Bounce with Me" | Lil' Bow Wow featuring Xscape |
| 9 | "Left, Right, Left" | Drama |
| 10 | "G'd Up" | Tha Eastsidaz featuring Butch Cassidy |
| 11 | "I Like Dem Girlz" | Lil Jon & the East Side Boyz |
| 12 | "Down Bottom" | Drag-On and Juvenile |
| 13 | "Bounce" | Miracle |
| 14 | "Yeah That's Us" | Major Figgas |
| 15 | "I Want It All" | Warren G featuring Mack 10 |
| 16 | "Flamboyant" | Big L |
| 17 | "Flowers for the Dead" | Cuban Link |
| 18 | "2 Bitches" | Too Short |
| 19 | "Step to This" | Master P featuring D.I.G. |
| 20 | "Cherchez La Ghost" | Ghostface Killah featuring U-God |
| 21 | "Move Somethin'" | Reflection Eternal |
| 22 | "Jigga My Nigga" | Jay-Z |
| 23 | "Simon Says" | Pharoahe Monch |
| 24 | "Got Your Money" | Ol' Dirty Bastard featuring Kelis |
| 25 | "Best Friend" | Puff Daddy featuring Mario Winans |
| 26 | "Nastradamus" | Nas |
| 27 | "One Four Love (Part 1)" | Hip Hop for Respect |
| 28 | "So Flossy" | Midwest Mafia featuring Phatty Banks |
| 29 | "Whoa!" | Black Rob |
| 30 | "How We Roll" | 69 Boyz |
| 31 | "He Did That" | Silkk the Shocker featuring Master P and Mac |
| 32 | "It's OK" | Slimm Calhoun featuring Andre 3000 |
| 33 | "Shake Ya Ass" | Mystikal |
| 34 | "Connect" | DJ Hurricane featuring Xzibit, Big Gipp and Pharoahe Monch |
| 35 | "Haffi Get De Gal Ya (Hot Gal Today)" | Sean Paul and Mr. Vegas |
| 36 | "Shake It Like a Dog" | Kane & Abel featuring 5th Ward Weebie |
| 37 | "Do It Again (Put Ya Hands Up)" | Jay-Z featuring Amil and Beanie Sigel |
| 38 | "Flawless" | Phife Dawg |
| 39 | "Bad Boyz" | Shyne featuring Barrington Levy |
| 40 | "Party Up (Up in Here)" | DMX |
| 41 | "U-Way (How We Do It)" | YoungBloodZ |
| 42 | "You Nasty" | Too Short |
| 43 | "How Much You Want Me" | Havana |
| 44 | "Come Ride with Me" | Johan |
| 45 | "That's What I'm Looking For" | Da Brat |
| 46 | "Un-Huh" | Devyne Stephens |
| 47 | "The Light" | Common |
| 48 | "Anything" | Jay-Z |
| 49 | "Whoa! Lil' Mama" | X-Con |
| 50 | "Pimpin' Ain't No Illusion" | UGK featuring Too Short and Kool Ace |

== See also ==
- 2000 in music
- Billboard Year-End Hot 100 singles of 2000
- Billboard Year-End Hot R&B/Hip-Hop Singles & Tracks of 2000
- List of Billboard number-one rap singles of 2000
