= List of Hot R&B/Hip-Hop Singles & Tracks number ones of 2000 =

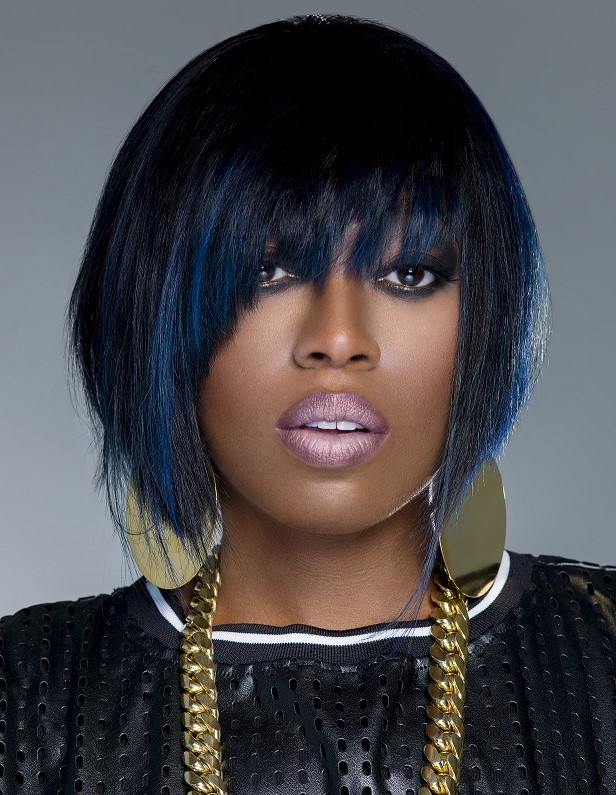
Missy Elliott (pictured in 2015) topped the chart with "Hot Boyz", featuring Nas, Eve and Q-Tip.

These are the Billboard R&B singles chart number-one singles of 2000.

== Chart history ==
Key
†	Indicates best-charting R&B single of 2000

Issue date	Song	Artist
January 1	"U Know What's Up"	Donell Jones featuring Lisa "Left Eye" Lopes
January 8	"Hot Boyz"	Missy "Misdemeanor" Elliott featuring Nas, Eve and Q-Tip
January 15	"Hot Boyz"	Missy "Misdemeanor" Elliott featuring Nas, Eve and Q-Tip
January 22	"Hot Boyz"	Missy "Misdemeanor" Elliott featuring Nas, Eve and Q-Tip
January 29	"Hot Boyz"	Missy "Misdemeanor" Elliott featuring Nas, Eve and Q-Tip
February 5	"Get It on Tonite"	Montell Jordan
February 12	"Get It on Tonite"	Montell Jordan
February 19	"Get It on Tonite"	Montell Jordan
February 26	"Thank God I Found You"	Mariah Carey featuring Joe
March 4	"Hot Boyz"	Missy "Misdemeanor" Elliott featuring Nas, Eve and Q-Tip
March 11	"Hot Boyz"	Missy "Misdemeanor" Elliott featuring Nas, Eve and Q-Tip
March 18	"Say My Name"	Destiny's Child
March 25	"Say My Name"	Destiny's Child
April 1	"Say My Name"	Destiny's Child
April 8	"Maria Maria"	Santana featuring The Product G&B
April 15	"Maria Maria"	Santana featuring The Product G&B
April 22	"Maria Maria"	Santana featuring The Product G&B
April 29	"He Wasn't Man Enough"	Toni Braxton
May 6	"He Wasn't Man Enough"	Toni Braxton
May 13	"He Wasn't Man Enough"	Toni Braxton
May 20	"He Wasn't Man Enough"	Toni Braxton
May 27	"I Wish"	Carl Thomas
June 3	"I Wish"	Carl Thomas
June 10	"I Wish"	Carl Thomas
June 17	"I Wish"	Carl Thomas
June 24	"I Wish"	Carl Thomas
July 1	"I Wish"	Carl Thomas
July 8	"Separated"	Avant
July 15	"Let's Get Married" †	Jagged Edge
July 22	"Let's Get Married" †	Jagged Edge
July 29	"Let's Get Married" †	Jagged Edge
August 5	"Incomplete"	Sisqó
August 12	"Incomplete"	Sisqó
August 19	"Incomplete"	Sisqó
August 26	"Incomplete"	Sisqó
September 2	"No More"	Ruff Endz
September 9	"Wifey"	Next
September 16	"Bounce with Me"	Lil Bow Wow featuring Xscape
September 23	"Incomplete"	Sisqó
September 30	"Liar"	Profyle
October 7	"Bag Lady"	Erykah Badu
October 14	"Bag Lady"	Erykah Badu
October 21	"Bag Lady"	Erykah Badu
October 28	"Bag Lady"	Erykah Badu
November 4	"Bag Lady"	Erykah Badu
November 11	"Bag Lady"	Erykah Badu
November 18	"I Wish"	R. Kelly
November 25	"I Wish"	R. Kelly
December 2	"I Wish"	R. Kelly
December 9	"I Just Wanna Luv U (Give It 2 Me)"	Jay-Z
December 16	"Ms. Jackson"	OutKast
December 23	"Independent Women Part I"	Destiny's Child
December 30	"Independent Women Part I"	Destiny's Child

== See also ==
- 2000 in music
- Billboard Year-End Hot R&B/Hip-Hop Singles & Tracks of 2000
- List of number-one R&B hits (United States)
