= War & Peace, Vol. 2 (The Peace Disc) =

Studio album by Ice Cube
- Released: March 21, 2000
- Genres: West Coast hip-hop; gangsta rap
- Length: 55:29
- Labels: Lench Mob; Priority
- Producers: Ice Cube; DJ Joe Rodriquez; Dr. Dre; Carl "Chucky" Thompson; One Eye; T-Bone

Ice Cube chronology
War & Peace, Vol. 1 (The War Disc) (1998)	War & Peace, Vol. 2 (The Peace Disc) (2000)	Greatest Hits (2001)

Singles from War & Peace, Vol. 2 (The Peace Disc)
- 1. "You Can Do It" Released: November 16, 1999; 2. "Until We Rich" Released: April 4, 2000; 3. "Hello" Released: June 3, 2000

Professional ratings
Review scores
Source	Rating
AllMusic	2.5/5 stars
Christgau's Consumer Guide	C+
Entertainment Weekly	B−
The Guardian	3/5 stars
RapReviews	7/10
Rolling Stone	3/5 stars
The Source	3.5/5 stars
USA Today	3/4 stars
Vibe	favorable

War & Peace, Vol. 2 (The Peace Disc) is the sixth studio album by American rapper Ice Cube, released March 21, 2000, on his own label Lench Mob Records with distribution by Priority Records. It is the second part from the two-album project War & Peace; the previous volume, War & Peace Vol. 1 (The War Disc) was released in 1998. This was Ice Cube's final album under Priority Records and his last until the release of Laugh Now, Cry Later in 2006.

The album received generally positive reviews from critics and debuted at number three on the US Billboard 200, selling 185,000 copies in its first week. The album was certified gold by the Recording Industry Association of America (RIAA) in May 2000. The club song "You Can Do It", which then later re-released in 2004, was a UK number two for Ice Cube.

== Commercial performance ==
War & Peace, Vol. 2 (The Peace Disc) debuted at number three on the US Billboard 200, selling 185,000 copies in its first week. This became Ice Cube's fifth US top-ten album. The album also debuted at number one on the US Top R&B/Hip-Hop Albums chart. On May 31, 2000, the album was certified gold by the Recording Industry Association of America (RIAA) for sales of over 500,000 copies in the United States.

== Track listing ==
Credits adapted from the album's liner notes.

No.	Title	Writer(s)	Producer(s)	Length
1.	"Hello" (featuring Dr. Dre and MC Ren)	O'Shea Jackson; Andre Young; Lorenzo Patterson	Dr. Dre	3:52
2.	"Pimp Homeo (Insert)"			0:35
3.	"You Ain't Gotta Lie (Ta Kick It)" (featuring Chris Rock)	Jackson; Carl Thompson; Rich Nice; Loren Hill	Chucky Thompson; Rich Nice; Loren Hill	4:06
4.	"The Gutter Shit" (featuring Jayo Felony, Gangsta and Squeak Ru)	Jackson; Terry Gray; Terrell Anderson; Marcus Moore	T-Bone; Ice Cube	4:29
5.	"Supreme Hustle"	Jackson; Thompson; Nice; Hill; Woodrow Cunningham	Chucky Thompson; Rich Nice; Loren Hill	4:22
6.	"Mental Warfare (Insert)"			1:01
7.	"24 Mo' Hours"	Jackson; Kevin Gilliam	Battlecat	3:27
8.	"Until We Rich" (featuring Krayzie Bone)	Jackson; Thompson; Nice; Hill; Anthony Henderson	Chucky Thompson; Rich Nice; Loren Hill; Kevin Veney	4:14
9.	"You Can Do It" (featuring Mack 10 and Ms. Toi)	Jackson; Dedrick Rolison; Donald Saunders; Arthur Baker; Afrika Bambaataa; John Robie; Robert Darrell Allen; John Miller; Ellis Williams	One Eye	4:19
10.	"Mackin' & Driving (Insert)"			0:27
11.	"Gotta Be Insanity"	Jackson; Sean Combs; Larry Blackmon; Anthony Lockett	Sean "Puffy" Combs; Mario Winans (co.)	4:00
12.	"Roll All Day"	Jackson; Saunders	One Eye	3:15
13.	"Can You Bounce?"	Jackson; Richard Frierson	Richard "Younglord" Frierson	3:53
14.	"Dinner with the CEO (Insert)"			0:49
15.	"Record Company Pimpin'"	Jackson; Gray; Tyrone Crum; Keith Harrison; Robert Neal; Roger Parker; Clarence Satchell; Ralph Aikens; Erick Sermon; Parrish Smith	Bud'da	4:46
16.	"Waitin' ta Hate"	Jackson; George Clinton, Jr.; Walter Morrison; William Nichols; Sermon; Garry Shider; Smith; Allen Williams	One Eye; DJ Joe Rodriguez	3:38
17.	"Nigga of the Century"	Jackson; Charly Charles	Charly "Suga Bear" Charles	4:14
18.	"You Can Do It (Instrumental)"		One Eye	4:20

== Samples ==
Until We Rich

- "Show Me" by Glenn Jones

Record Company Pimpin

- "Riding High" by Faze-O
- "Please Listen to My Demo" by EPMD

Hello

- "The Watcher" by Dr. Dre

Waitin' ta Hate

- "Public Enemy No. 1" by Public Enemy
- "So Wat Cha Sayin'" by EPMD

You Can Do It

- "I Dream of Jeannie" by Hugo Montenegro
- "Rapper's Delight" by Sugarhill Gang
- "The Breaks" by Kurtis Blow
- "Planet Rock" by Afrika Bambaataa and Soulsonic Force
- "I Wanna Rock" by Luke

Gotta Be Insanity

- "Keep It Hot" by Cameo
- "The What" by the Notorious B.I.G.

Mackin' & Driving

- "Pushin' Weight" by Ice Cube

== Charts ==
=== Weekly charts ===
Chart (2000)	Peak position
Australian Albums (ARIA)	24
Canadian Albums (Billboard)	7
Canadian R&B Albums (Nielsen SoundScan)	10
Dutch Albums (Album Top 100)	42
German Albums (Offizielle Top 100)	29
UK Albums (Official Charts)	56
US Billboard 200	3
US Top R&B/Hip-Hop Albums (Billboard)	1

=== Year-end charts ===
Chart (2000)	Position
Canadian Albums (Nielsen SoundScan)	113
US Billboard 200	99
US Top R&B/Hip-Hop Albums (Billboard)	44

Chart (2001)	Position
Canadian R&B Albums (Nielsen SoundScan)	153

== Certifications ==
Certifications for War & Peace - Vol 2
Region	Certification	Certified units/sales
Canada (Music Canada)	Gold	50,000^{^}
United Kingdom (BPI)	Silver	60,000^{*}
United States (RIAA)	Gold	500,000^{^}
^{*} Sales figures based on certification alone.^{^} Shipments figures based on certification alone.

== See also ==
- List of number-one R&B albums of 2000 (U.S.)
