= Terry Heller =

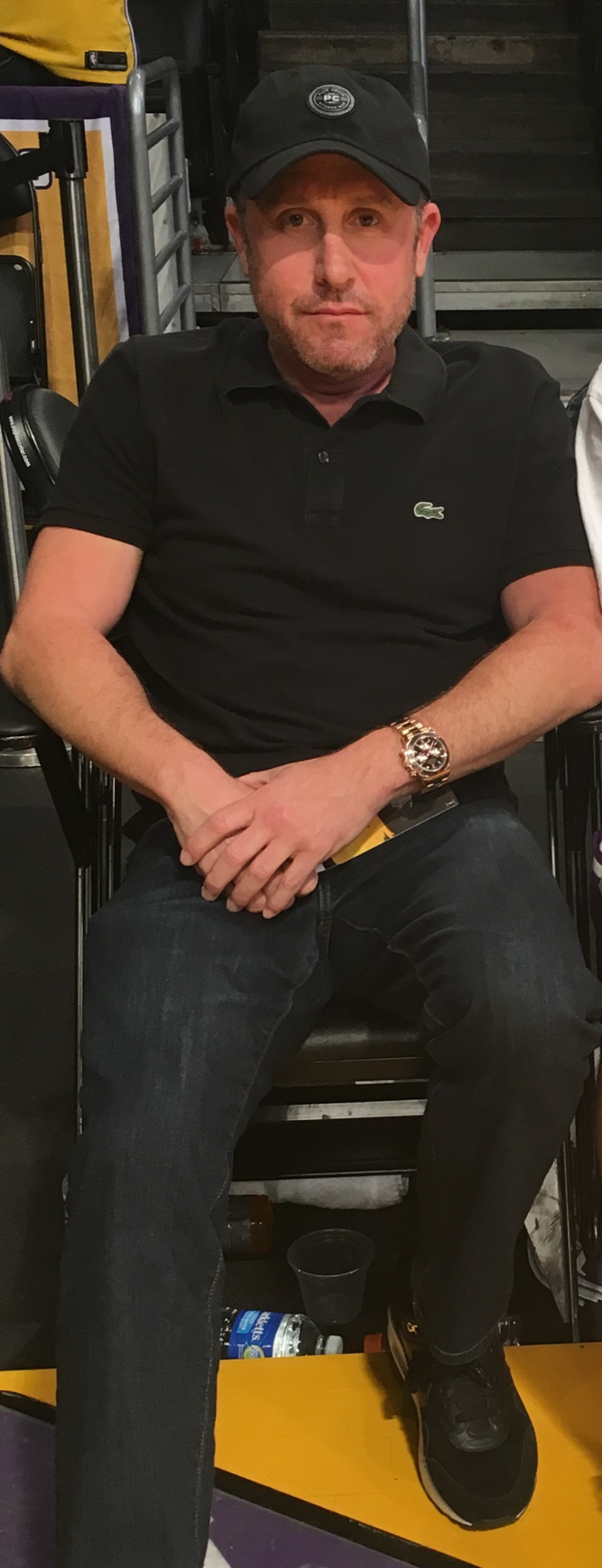
- Terry Heller at a Lakers game
- Born: Terry Edward Heller; 1973 (age 52–53); California
- Education: Pepperdine University
- Relatives: Jerry Heller
- Musical career
- Occupations: Music video director; entrepreneur; real estate developer
- Years active: 1993–

Terry Edward Heller (born 1973) is a former American music video director and entrepreneur. He is known for his work at Ruthless Records and as a real estate developer. As a music director, he is known for directing several music videos for hip-hop and R&B musicians including Bone Thugs-n-Harmony, Black Eyed Peas, Lil Wayne, Gang Starr, Ghostface Killah, Dru Hill, Beanie Sigel, Jay-Z, amongst many others. He was recognized by BET, VIBE magazine, Rolling Stone and has been featured on TMZ, iHeart Radio, Daily Mirror, Los Angeles Times and food magazine, Foodbeast, amongst others.

== Early life and education ==
Heller entered the music industry immediately after graduating high school, working as an artist representative for his uncle, N.W.A manager Jerry Heller and rapper Eazy-E, at Ruthless Records.

During this period, he discovered the musician and producer, then a teenager, Will.i.am. According to an interview of Will.i.am by Vice magazine, Will.i.am iterated that Heller spotted him freestyling at a rap contest hosted by actor David Faustino in the summer of 1991. Heller brought him and his group called Atban Klann; which also included rapper Apl.de.ap; to Ruthless Records, where they signed in January 1992, and managed the group. The group later evolved into the multi-platinum recording artists, The Black Eyed Peas. Heller was also credited for devising the marketing strategy and directing the first two music videos for Bone Thugs-n-Harmony.

Heller attended Pepperdine University.

== Career ==
=== Music video director ===
In the mid-to-late 1990s, Heller transitioned into directing music videos. He founded his production company, Clever Films. He directed several hip hop and RnB music videos in the 1990s and early 2000s.

He debuted directing the music video of Thuggish Ruggish Bone (1994) by rap group, Bone Thugs-n-Harmony. In 1995, he directed the video to the hip-hop song titled Bomdigi by rapper Erick Sermon. He directed Gang Starr's You Know My Steez (1997), which BET listed as one of the "most definitive Hip-Hop videos of 1997" and which was later named one of the "150 Greatest Hip-Hop Videos of All Time" by Rolling Stone in 2023. The video featured DJ Premier and Flavor Flav. He directed the music video to Hand in Hand (1998) by DJ Quik, in which 2nd II None and singer El Debarge were featured. He also directed the video for All That I Got Is You, the solo debut single by Wu-Tang Clan rapper Ghostface Killah noted by VIBE magazine as one of the "top Hip-Hop/R&B songs that show appreciation for loving mothers". He directed the music video to the number-one R&B single Liar, by group Profyle from their second studio album Nothin' but Drama (2000). He directed the music video for Tell Me, the debut single by Dru Hill which peaked t number 18 on the Billboard Hot 100 and number five on the R&B chart. He produced the track 7 BEP Empire/Get Original from the Behind the Bridge to Elephunk video album by group the Black Eyed Peas. He directed the video to the K-Ci & JoJo song, titled Crazy. He directed the video to the Lil Wayne featuring Juvenile song, Respect Us (1999) from Lil Wayne's album, Tha Block Is Hot. In 2001, Heller has directed several music videos featuring Beanie Sigel. Their collaborations include Dance with Me (Remix) by 112 featuring Beanie Sigel and Think It's a Game by Beanie Sigel featuring Jay-Z, Young Chris, and Freeway. He directed the video to grammy nominated song Still Fly (2003) by Big Tymers.

He collaborated with Daniel Pearl, directing the Verizon advert.

=== Entrepreneur ===
After more than a decade in the music industry, Heller transitioned into business and real estate. In 2004, he founded the residential and commercial real estate development, Heller Holdings LLC. While managing his real estate deals through Heller Holdings, Heller encountered a consistent lack of reliable roofing companies. To address this market gap, he acquired the established firm one of the fastest growing roofing company in Southern California, Preferred Roofing in June 2024 and became its CEO.

==== Restaurateur ====
Heller entered the restaurant industry in 2012, founding the Plan Check Kitchen + Bar group in Los Angeles. He collaborated with chef Ernesto Uchimura to develop the menu, which included innovations like "Ketchup Leather." The concept expanded to multiple Los Angeles locations and gained recognition in local media. He was featured in The Hollywood Reporter’s "Why Restaurants are L.A.’s Second-Riskiest Investment" analysis, and the restaurant was reviewed by food critic, Jonathan Gold.

== Videography ==
Year	Video	Artist	Note
1994	Thuggish Ruggish Bone	Bone Thugs-n-Harmony	Heller's debut video
1995	Bomdigi	Erick Sermon	utilized samples from the Mary Jane Girls' All Night Long; was co-directed by Chuck Ozeas
1996	All That I Got Is You	Ghostface Killah	noted by VIBE magazine as one of the "top Hip-Hop/R&B songs that show appreciation for loving mothers".
1996	Tell Me	Dru Hill	debut single; peaked at number 18 on the Billboard Hot 100 and number five on the R&B chart
1997	You Know My Steez	Gang Starr	BET listed as one of the "most definitive Hip-Hop videos of 1997"; named one of the "150 Greatest Hip-Hop Videos of All Time" by Rolling Stone in 2023; video featured DJ Premier and Flavor Flav.
1998	Hand in Hand	DJ Quik	featuring 2nd II None and singer El Debarge
1999	Respect Us	Lil Wayne	featuring Juvenile; from Lil Wayne's album, Tha Block Is Hot
2000	Liar	Profyle	from their second studio album Nothin' but Drama
2000	BEP Empire/Get Original	Black Eyed Peas	from the Behind the Bridge to Elephunk video album
2001	Crazy	K-Ci & JoJo	
2001	Think It's a Game	Beanie Sigel	featuring Jay-Z, Young Chris, and Freeway
2001	Dance with Me (Remix)	112	featuring Beanie Sigel
2003	Still Fly	Big Tymers	grammy nominated

== Recognition ==
- Gang Starr's You Know My Steez (1997) from their fifth studio album Moment of Truth, which BET listed as one of the "most definitive Hip-Hop videos of 1997" and which was later named one of the "150 Greatest Hip-Hop Videos of All Time" by Rolling Stone in 2023.
- All That I Got Is You, the solo debut single by Wu-Tang Clan rapper Ghostface Killah noted by VIBE magazine as one of the "top Hip-Hop/R&B songs that show appreciation for loving mothers".
- Still Fly (2003) by Big Tymers was Grammy nominated.

== Personal life ==
Terry Heller is the nephew of Jerry Heller, the late co-manager of N.W.A and co-founder of Ruthless Records. Following his uncle's death in September 2016, Heller got involved in the debate over Jerry Heller's legacy and the accuracy of his portrayal in the 2015 biographical film, Straight Outta Compton, consistently and publicly defending his uncle's character and business dealings. Terry Heller was also the family member who publicly shared that Jerry Heller had passed away, while listening to N.W.A.'s music.

=== Pursuing Legal Action ===
In December 2016, after Jerry Heller's passing, Terry Heller announced his intention to continue the defamation lawsuit his uncle had filed against the surviving members of N.W.A.

=== Personal Appeals ===
In the days after the funeral, he urged members of the group to attend the service as a "sign of respect."
