= Greatest Hits (Ice Cube album) =

Greatest hits album by Ice Cube
- Released: December 4, 2001
- Genres: Hardcore hip-hop, gangsta rap
- Length: 68:05
- Label: Priority
- Producer: Various

Ice Cube chronology
War & Peace Vol. 2 (The Peace Disc) (2000)	Greatest Hits (2001)	Laugh Now, Cry Later (2006)

Singles from Greatest Hits
- 1. "$100 Bill Y'all" Released: 2001

Professional ratings
Review scores
Source	Rating
AllMusic	4/5 stars
Pitchfork	8.5/10
Robert Christgau	A−

Greatest Hits is a compilation album by American rapper Ice Cube. It was released on December 4, 2001. It compiles 17 of Ice Cube's most well-known songs. Two songs were exclusive to the album, "$100 Bill Y'all" and "In the Late Night Hour".

== Commercial performance ==
The album debuted on #54 on the US Billboard 200 with first week sales of 68,000 copies.

== Track listing ==
1. "Pushin' Weight" (featuring Mr. Short Khop)
2. "Check Yo Self" [Remix] (featuring Das EFX)
  - Contains samples from "The Message" by Grandmaster Flash & "Ready to Die" by The Notorious B.I.G.
3. "We Be Clubbin'"
  - Contains a sample from "More Bounce to the Ounce" by Zapp
4. "$100 Bill Y'all"
  - Released as a single, which peaked at #67 on the US Billboard R&B/Hip-Hop chart.
5. "Once Upon a Time in the Projects"
  - Contains sample from "Cop Him" by Betty Davis
6. "Bow Down" (with Westside Connection)
  - Contains sample from "Tell Me" by Groove Theory
7. "Hello" (featuring MC Ren & Dr. Dre)
8. "You Can Do It" (featuring Mack 10 & Ms. Toi)
  - Contains sample from "Planet Rock" by Afrika Bambaataa
9. "You Know How We Do It"
  - Contains samples from "The Show Is Over" by Evelyn Champagne King, "Hung Up On My Baby" by Isaac Hayes, "Billie Jean" by Michael Jackson & "Summer Madness" by Kool & The Gang
10. "It Was a Good Day"
  - Contains samples from "Footsteps in the Dark" by the Isley Brothers, "Come On Sexy Mama" by The Moments, "Sir Nose D'Voidoffunk (Pay Attention- B3M)" by Parliament & "Let's Do It Again" by Staple Singers
11. "Bop Gun (One Nation)" [Radio Edit] (featuring George Clinton)
  - Contains interpolation from "One Nation Under A Groove" by Funkadelic & a sample from "Bop Gun (Endangered Species)" by Parliament
12. "What Can I Do?" [Remix]
  - Contains sample from "More Bounce to the Ounce" by Zapp
13. "My Summer Vacation"
  - Contains sample from "Atomic Dog" by George Clinton & "So Ruff, So Tuff" by Roger Troutman
14. "Steady Mobbin'"
  - Contains samples from "Reach Out" by Average White Band, "Sir Nose D'Voidoffunk (Pay Attention- B3M)" and "Theme From the Black Hole" by Parliament, "Love Amnesia" by Parlet & "After the Dance" by Marvin Gaye
15. "Jackin' for Beats"
  - Contains samples from "Buzz Saw" by The Turtles, "More Bounce to the Ounce" by Zapp, "Bop Gun (Endangered Species)" by Parliament, "The Humpty Dance" by Digital Underground, "If it Don't Turn You on (You Outta Leave it Alone)" by B.T. Express, "It's A Man's Man's Man's World", "Cold Sweat", "The Payback", "Funky President" and "Funky Drummer" all by James Brown, "I Know You Got Soul" and "Hot Pants" by Bobby Byrd, "Sing A Simple Song" by Sly & The Family Stone, "Ashley's Roachclip" by Soul Searchers, "Bon Bon Vie" by T.S. Monk, "Psychedelic Shack" by The Temptations, "Hector" by The Village Callers, "Big Beat" by Billy Squier, "So What Cha Sayin" by EPMD & "The Haunted House" by Disney
16. "The Nigga Ya Love to Hate"
  - Contains samples from "Atomic Dog" by George Clinton & "Weak At the Knees" by Steve Arrington
17. "Late Night Hour" (featuring Pusha T)
  - Contains re-sung elements from "Fuck tha Police" & "Straight Outta Compton" by N.W.A

== Charts ==
=== Weekly charts ===
Chart (2001–2015)	Peak position
Australian Albums (ARIA)	41
US Billboard 200	54
US Top R&B/Hip-Hop Albums (Billboard)	11

=== Year-end charts ===
Chart (2002)	Position
Canadian R&B Albums (Nielsen SoundScan)	87
Canadian Rap Albums (Nielsen SoundScan)	46
US Top R&B/Hip-Hop Albums (Billboard)	76

== Certifications ==
Region	Certification	Certified units/sales
United Kingdom (BPI)	Gold	100,000^{^}
United States (RIAA)	Gold	500,000^{^}
^{^} Shipments figures based on certification alone.
