= Billboard Year-End Hot 100 singles of 2000 =

Ranking of recorded music

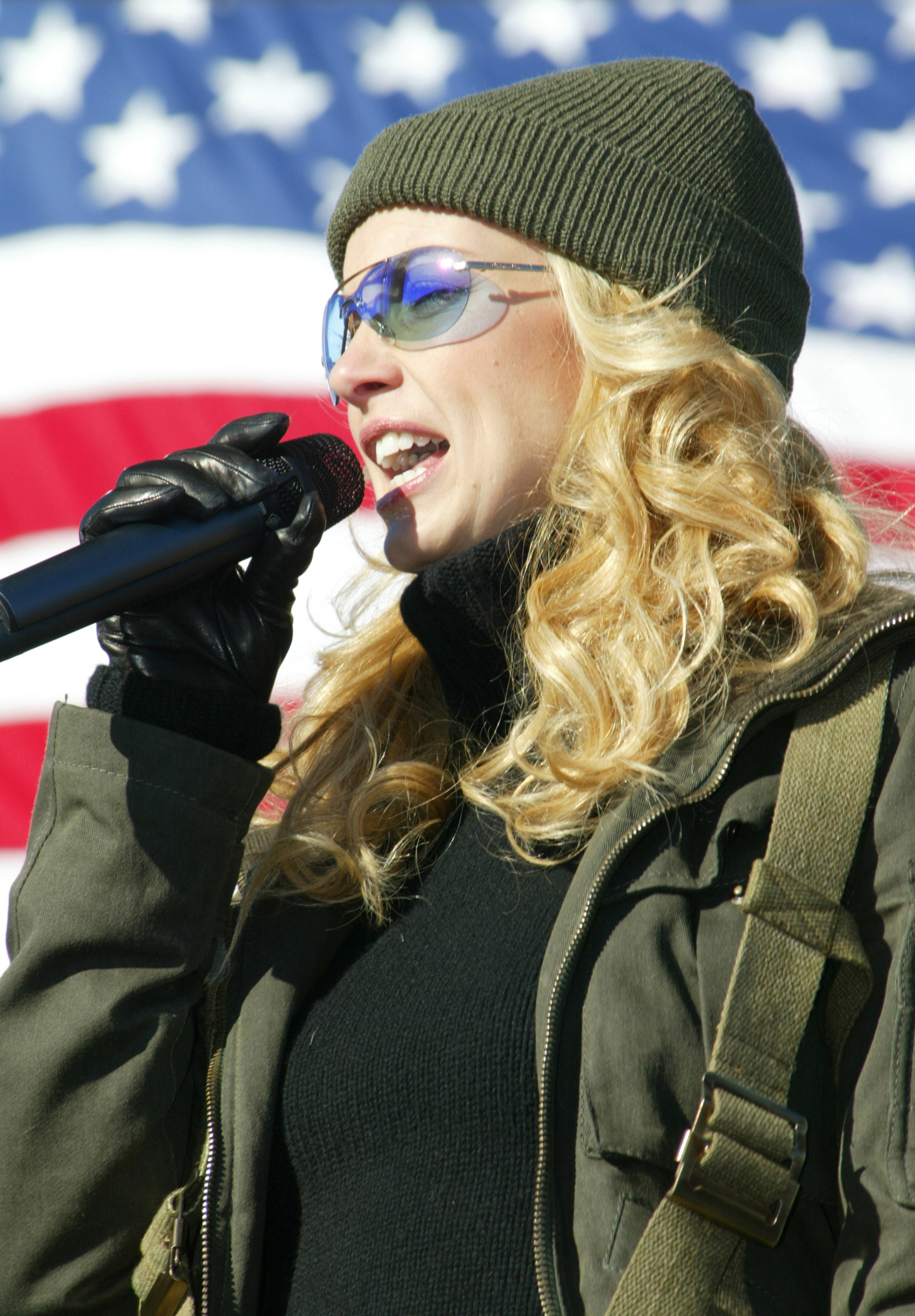
Faith Hill's single "Breathe" was the first country music recording to be ranked number one since Johnny Horton's "The Battle of New Orleans" in 1959. (Patsy Cline's "I Fall to Pieces" (1961) and Glen Campbell's "Rhinestone Cowboy" (1975) had each come close, ranking second.) Her song "The Way You Love Me" also made the list, at 41.

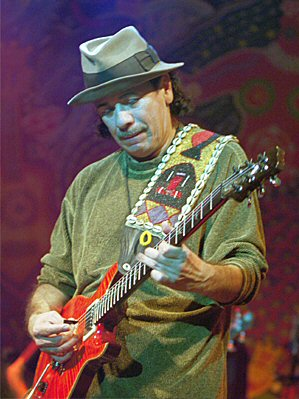
Latin rock band Santana had a strong showing, taking positions two and three with "Smooth" and "Maria Maria" from the Supernatural album.

This is a list of Billboard magazine's Top Hot 100 songs of 2000.

| No. | Title | Artist(s) |
|---|---|---|
| 1 | "Breathe" | Faith Hill |
| 2 | "Smooth" | Santana featuring Rob Thomas |
| 3 | "Maria Maria" | Santana featuring The Product G&B |
| 4 | "I Wanna Know" | Joe |
| 5 | "Everything You Want" | Vertical Horizon |
| 6 | "Say My Name" | Destiny's Child |
| 7 | "I Knew I Loved You" | Savage Garden |
| 8 | "Amazed" | Lonestar |
| 9 | "Bent" | Matchbox Twenty |
| 10 | "He Wasn't Man Enough" | Toni Braxton |
| 11 | "Higher" | Creed |
| 12 | "Try Again" | Aaliyah |
| 13 | "Jumpin', Jumpin'" | Destiny's Child |
| 14 | "Thong Song" | Sisqó |
| 15 | "Kryptonite" | 3 Doors Down |
| 16 | "There You Go" | Pink |
| 17 | "Music" | Madonna |
| 18 | "Doesn't Really Matter" | Janet |
| 19 | "What a Girl Wants" | Christina Aguilera |
| 20 | "Back at One" | Brian McKnight |
| 21 | "Bye Bye Bye" | NSYNC |
| 22 | "You Sang to Me" | Marc Anthony |
| 23 | "I Need to Know" | Marc Anthony |
| 24 | "Get It On Tonite" | Montell Jordan |
| 25 | "Incomplete" | Sisqó |
| 26 | "I Try" | Macy Gray |
| 27 | "It's Gonna Be Me" | NSYNC |
| 28 | "That's the Way It Is" | Celine Dion |
| 29 | "Country Grammar (Hot Shit)" | Nelly |
| 30 | "Bring It All to Me" | Blaque |
| 31 | "Show Me the Meaning of Being Lonely" | Backstreet Boys |
| 32 | "Hot Boyz" | Missy Elliott featuring Nas, Eve and Q-Tip |
| 33 | "Back Here" | BBMak |
| 34 | "It Feels So Good" | Sonique |
| 35 | "Absolutely (Story of a Girl)" | Nine Days |
| 36 | "With Arms Wide Open" | Creed |
| 37 | "Be with You" | Enrique Iglesias |
| 38 | "Come On Over Baby (All I Want Is You)" | Christina Aguilera |
| 39 | "No More" | Ruff Endz |
| 40 | "All the Small Things" | Blink-182 |
| 41 | "The Way You Love Me" | Faith Hill |
| 42 | "I Turn to You" | Christina Aguilera |
| 43 | "Never Let You Go" | Third Eye Blind |
| 44 | "I Need You" | LeAnn Rimes |
| 45 | "Thank God I Found You" | Mariah Carey featuring Joe and 98 Degrees |
| 46 | "Let's Get Married" | Jagged Edge |
| 47 | "My Love Is Your Love" | Whitney Houston |
| 48 | "Then the Morning Comes" | Smash Mouth |
| 49 | "Blue (Da Ba Dee)" | Eiffel 65 |
| 50 | "Desert Rose" | Sting featuring Cheb Mami |
| 51 | "The Real Slim Shady" | Eminem |
| 52 | "Most Girls" | Pink |
| 53 | "Wifey" | Next |
| 54 | "Wonderful" | Everclear |
| 55 | "Oops!... I Did It Again" | Britney Spears |
| 56 | "I Wanna Love You Forever" | Jessica Simpson |
| 57 | "Give Me Just One Night (Una Noche)" | 98 Degrees |
| 58 | "Take a Picture" | Filter |
| 59 | "Otherside" | Red Hot Chili Peppers |
| 60 | "Big Pimpin'" | Jay-Z featuring UGK |
| 61 | "Purest of Pain (A Puro Dolor)" | Son by Four |
| 62 | "He Can't Love U" | Jagged Edge |
| 63 | "Separated" | Avant |
| 64 | "I Wish" | Carl Thomas |
| 65 | "U Know What's Up" | Donell Jones |
| 66 | "Faded" | soulDecision featuring Thrust |
| 67 | "Only God Knows Why" | Kid Rock |
| 68 | "Shake Ya Ass" | Mystikal |
| 69 | "Bag Lady" | Erykah Badu |
| 70 | "Meet Virginia" | Train |
| 71 | "Party Up (Up in Here)" | DMX |
| 72 | "Case of the Ex (Whatcha Gonna Do)" | Mýa |
| 73 | "Forgot About Dre" | Dr. Dre featuring Eminem |
| 74 | "That's the Way" | Jo Dee Messina |
| 75 | "Swear It Again" | Westlife |
| 76 | "The Next Episode" | Dr. Dre featuring Snoop Dogg |
| 77 | "From the Bottom of My Broken Heart" | Britney Spears |
| 78 | "Crash and Burn" | Savage Garden |
| 79 | "Yes!" | Chad Brock |
| 80 | "The Best Day" | George Strait |
| 81 | "Where I Wanna Be" | Donell Jones |
| 82 | "How Do You Like Me Now?!" | Toby Keith |
| 83 | "My Best Friend" | Tim McGraw |
| 84 | "Broadway" | Goo Goo Dolls |
| 85 | "What'chu Like" | Da Brat featuring Tyrese |
| 86 | "Don't Think I'm Not" | Kandi |
| 87 | "I Hope You Dance" | Lee Ann Womack with Sons of the Desert |
| 88 | "Better Off Alone" | Alice Deejay |
| 89 | "Dance with Me" | Debelah Morgan |
| 90 | "What About Now" | Lonestar |
| 91 | "I Like It" | Sammie |
| 92 | "24/7" | Kevon Edmonds |
| 93 | "Girl on TV" | LFO |
| 94 | "Bounce with Me" | Lil' Bow Wow featuring Xscape |
| 95 | "Cowboy Take Me Away" | Dixie Chicks |
| 96 | "I Don't Wanna" | Aaliyah |
| 97 | "Independent Women Part I" | Destiny's Child |
| 98 | "Gotta Tell You" | Samantha Mumba |
| 99 | "Waiting for Tonight" | Jennifer Lopez |
| 100 | "Shackles (Praise You)" | Mary Mary |

== See also ==
- 2000 in music
- Billboard Year-End Hot R&B/Hip-Hop Singles & Tracks of 2000
- Billboard Year-End Hot Rap Singles of 2000
- List of Billboard Hot 100 number ones of 2000
- List of Billboard Hot 100 top-ten singles in 2000
