= Causin =

Causin may refer to:

- Andrea Causin, born 1972, an Italian politician
- John Causin, 1811-1861, American politician and congressman from Maryland
- Causin' Drama, a 2000 album by rapper Drama
