= No Coincidence =

No Coincidence may refer to:

- No Coincidence (film), a 1939 Hungarian comedy film
- No Coincidence, a 1997 album by Jocasta
- "No Coincidence", a song by Kelly Rowland from the album Simply Deep, 2002
- "No Coincidence", a song by Khalil from the album Prove It All, 2017
