= Greatest Hits (Ruff Endz album) =

Greatest hits album by Ruff Endz
- Released: July 1, 2003
- Recorded: 2000–2002
- Genre: R&B
- Label: Epic

Ruff Endz chronology
Someone To Love You (2002)	Greatest Hits (2003)	The Final Chapter (2010)

Greatest Hits is a compilation album by Ruff Endz released on Epic Records in 2003.

== Track listing ==
1. No More
2. Someone To Love You
3. You Mean The World To Me
4. Will You Be Mine
5. If I Was The One
6. Where Does Love Go From Here
7. Sure Thing
8. I Apologize
9. Cash, Money, Cars, Clothes (featuring Memphis Bleek)
10. Shake It
11. You
12. Threesome
