= Someone to Love You =

Studio album by Ruff Endz
- Released: May 14, 2002
- Studio: Lobo Recording Studio, Deer Park, New York; KC Productions Recording Studio, Washington, D.C.; Sony Music Studios, New York City; Vanguard Studios, Detroit; The Weight Room Studios, New York City; Right Track Studios, New York City; Big Noise Studios, New York City; Ardent Studios, Memphis
- Genre: Contemporary R&B
- Length: 1:02:58
- Label: Epic
- Producer: Troy Moet; C. Cole; Cory Rooney; Dan Shea; Frank Johnson; Mike Clemons; Nate Clemons; Night & Day; Ruff Endz; Seven; The Characters; Troy Oliver

Ruff Endz chronology
Love Crimes (2000)	Someone to Love You (2002)	The Final Chapter (2010)

Singles from Someone to Love You
- 1. "Cash, Money, Cars, Clothes" Released: August 14, 2001; 2. "Someone to Love You" Released: 2002

Professional ratings
Review scores
Source	Rating
AllMusic	4/5 stars
Vibe	2.5/5 stars

Someone to Love You is the second studio album by American R&B duo Ruff Endz. It was released on May 14, 2002, via Epic Records. Recording sessions took place from 2001 to 2002 at Lobo Recording Studio, at Sony Music Studios, at the Weight Room Studios, at Right Track Studios and at Big Noise Studios in New York, at KC Productions Recording Studio in Washington, D.C., at Ardent Studios in Memphis, Tennessee, and at Vanguard Studios in Detroit. Production was handled by Nate Clemons, Mike Clemons, Cory Rooney, Troy Oliver, C. Cole, Dan Shea, Frank Johnson, Night & Day, Seven, the Characters and Ruff Endz. It peaked at number 27 on the Billboard 200 and number 8 on the Top R&B/Hip-Hop Albums chart.

A music video for the album's lead single, "Cash, Money, Cars, Clothes" featuring Memphis Bleek, was directed by Simón Brand. The album's second single, "Someone to Love You", was released to Mainstream Urban, Rhythmic and Urban AC radio on February 11, 2002. It peaked at number 49 on the Billboard Hot 100, while the music video for the track debuted on B.E.T.'s 106 & Park on March 18, 2002.

== Track listing ==
No.	Title	Writer(s)	Producer(s)	Length
1.	"Someone to Love You"	Cory Rooney	Cory Rooney; Troy Oliver	4:57
2.	"Will You Be Mine"	Dante Jordan; David Chance; Michael Clemons; Nate Clemons	Davinch; Mike Clemons; Nate Clemons	5:04
3.	"You"	Gardner Cole	The Characters	4:39
4.	"Cash, Money, Cars, Clothes" (featuring Memphis Bleek)	Jordan; Chance; Malik Cox	Davinch	4:02
5.	"Bigger"	Jolyon Skinner; Gasner Hughes; Tonyatta Martinez; Kim Elsberg Moeller	Nite & Day	4:57
6.	"Shake It"	Michael-Charles Nahounou; Corron Cole	C. Cole; Tony Moet (co.)	4:05
7.	"Would U Leave Me"	Jordan; Chance; Robert Headen	Davinch	4:19
8.	"Sure Thing"	Charmelle Cofield; Troy Oliver	Troy Oliver	4:38
9.	"Kamasutra"	Jordan; Chance; Headen	Ruff Endz	4:26
10.	"Threesome"	Jordan; Chance; M. Clemons; N. Clemons	Mike Clemons; Nate Clemons	4:47
11.	"If It Wasn't For..."	Jerel Allen; Terry Jerome Harris	Seven	4:22
12.	"You Mean the World to Me"	Rooney; Daniel Shea; Robin Thicke	Core Rooney; Dan Shea	4:09
13.	"Don't Stop"	Jordan; Rufus Waller; Frank Johnson; James Pierce	Frank Johnson	3:28
14.	"Look to the Hills"	Jordan; Chance; M. Clemons; N. Clemons	Davinch; Nate Clemons (co.)	5:05
Total length:				1:02:58

== Charts ==
Chart (2002)	Peak position
US Billboard 200	27
US Top R&B/Hip-Hop Albums (Billboard)	8
