= Young World: The Future =

Studio album by Lil' Zane
- Released: August 22, 2000
- Recorded: 1997–2000
- Studio: Patchwerk Recording Studios (Atlanta, GA); Silent Sound Studios (Atlanta, GA); Tree Sound Studios (Norcross, GA); The Village Recorder (Los Angeles, CA); Doppler Studios (Atlanta, GA); DARP Studios (Atlanta, GA); Westlake Studios (Los Angeles, CA); D-Lo Studio (Atlanta, GA); 12th Street Recording Studios (Miami Beach, FL); Wonder Twins Studios (Atlanta, GA); Worldwide Studios (Atlanta, GA)
- Genre: Southern hip hop; pop; pop rap; R&B
- Length: 65:46
- Label: Priority
- Producer: Kevin Wales (also exec.); Diggie Doms; Kenny Jones; Akon; Anthony Dent; Leslie Brathwaite; Mo'zart; Scahdrac Meshac Milhomme; Antonio Mobley; Ken Fambro; Ricciano Lumpkins; Troy "Tha Rolla" Sanders

Lil' Zane chronology
Young World: The Future (2000)	The Big Zane Theory (2003)

Singles from Young World: The Future
- 1. "Callin' Me" Released: June 6, 2000; 2. "None Tonight" Released: September 3, 2000

Young World: The Future is the debut studio album by rapper Lil' Zane. The album features his smash hit single "Callin' Me". The album debuted at number 165 on the Billboard 200 chart with 7,000 copies sold in its first week and then peaked its second week at number 25 with 40,000 sold that week. The album also peaked at number 4 on the Top R&B/Hip-Hop Albums.

== Track listing ==
No.	Title	Writer(s)	Producer(s)	Length
1.	"Top Down" (featuring Uncle Luke)	Z. Copeland, Jr.; S. Milhomme; A. Gilmore; S. Bishop	Scahdrac Meshac Milhomme	4:33
2.	"M.O.N.E.Y."	Z. Copeland, Jr.; I. Folmar; A. Dent; M. Holder	Anthony Dent	3:38
3.	"Callin' Me" (featuring 112)	Z. Copeland, Jr.; I. Folmar; D. Warren; K. Jones	Diggie Doms; Kenny "Mistafiss" Jones	4:17
4.	"What Must I Do" (featuring Akon)	Z. Copeland, Jr.; A. Thiam; M. Thiam	Akon; Mo'zart	3:44
5.	"Die Famous"	Z. Copeland, Jr.; A. Mobley; K. Fambro	Antonio Mobley; Ken Fambro	4:57
6.	"Partners Come Along Too"	Z. Copeland, Jr.; I. Folmar; D. Warren; K. Jones	Diggie Doms; Kenny "Mistafiss" Jones	4:22
7.	"None Tonight"	Z. Copeland, Jr.; D. Lewis; R. Lumpkins	Ricciano Lumpkins	4:26
8.	"Ride on 'Em"	Z. Copeland, Jr.; I. Folmar; D. Warren; K. Jones; E. Davis	Diggie Doms; Kenny "Mistafiss" Jones	4:09
9.	"Ways of the World"	D. Miller; G. Sumner	Leslie Brathwaite	4:33
10.	"All About the Fun" (featuring Da Howg & Angennetta Boys)	Z. Copeland, Jr.; W. Lamar; S. Murdock; K. Wales; T. Sanders; L. Troutman; R. Troutman; F. Davis	Kevin Wales; Troy "Tha Rolla" Sanders	4:28
11.	"What's Up"	Z. Copeland, Jr.; A. Thiam; M. Thiam	Akon; Mo'zart	3:45
12.	"You Must Really Love Me"	Z. Copeland, Jr.; G. White; K. Wales; S. Milhomme	Scahdrac Meshac Milhomme	3:40
13.	"Too Hot to Stop"	Z. Copeland, Jr.; G. Brown	Anthony Dent	3:12
14.	"Beautiful Feelin'"	Z. Copeland, Jr.; W. Andress	Leslie Brathwaite	3:58
15.	"We Ain't the One [contains hidden track "You Don't Wanna Fuck With Us"]"	Z. Copeland, Jr.; R. Muller	Diggie Doms; Kenny "Mistafiss" Jones	8:02
Total length:				65:46

Bonus Tracks
No.	Title	Producer(s)	Length
16.	"Money Stretch"		3:54
17.	"Anywhere" (featuring 112)	Daron Jones	4:05
18.	"Hard Ball" (featuring Lil' Wayne, Lil' Bow Wow & Sammie)	Jermaine Dupri	4:07
19.	"Anywhere (Bad Boy Remix)" (featuring 112 & Shyne)		4:37

=== Samples ===
- "Ride on 'Em" contains dialogue samples from the film Menace II Society.
- "Ways of the World" contains a sample of "Shape of My Heart" by Sting and Dominic Miller.
- "All About the Fun" contains an interpolation of "Computer Love" by Zapp.
- "Beautiful Feelin" contains a sample of "Love is the Key" by Tuck & Patti.

== Chart history ==
Chart (2000)	Peak position
US Billboard 200	25
US Top R&B/Hip-Hop Albums (Billboard)	4
