= Until We Rich =

Single by Ice Cube featuring Krayzie Bone

from the album War & Peace Vol. 2 (The Peace Disc)
- Released: April 4, 2000
- Recorded: 1998–99
- Genre: Hip-hop; West Coast hip-hop
- Label: Lench Mob; Priority
- Songwriters: O'Shea Jackson; Anthony Henderson
- Producer: Chucky Thompson

Ice Cube singles chronology
"You Can Do It" (1999)	"Until We Rich" (2000)	"Hello" (2000)

Krayzie Bone singles chronology
"Paper" (1999)	"Until We Rich" (2000)	"I'm Not Sleeping" (2000)

Music video
- "Until We Rich" on YouTube

"Until We Rich" is a single by Ice Cube featuring Krayzie Bone, from Ice Cube's 2000 album, War & Peace Vol. 2 (The Peace Disc). The song conveys the message that the most important things in the world are health and life. The beat, produced by Carl "Chucky" Thompson, contains a sample of "Show Me" by Glenn Jones that was also used in Queensbridge rapper AZ's Pieces of a Man album track "How Ya Livin" featuring Nas. It peaked at number 50 on the Billboard Hot R&B/Hip-Hop Singles & Tracks chart.

== Certifications ==
Region	Certification	Certified units/sales
New Zealand (RMNZ)	Gold	15,000^{‡}
^{‡} Sales+streaming figures based on certification alone.
