= Khalil (singer) =

American singer

- Khalil in 2014

Background information
- Born: Khalil Amir Sharieff; November 22, 1994 (age 31)
- Origin: Sacramento, California, U.S.
- Genres: R&B; hip hop; pop
- Occupations: Singer; songwriter; rapper
- Years active: 2008–present
- Labels: The Island Def Jam; Worldwide; Slip-n-Slide; Interscope; Empire
- Website: www.itskhalil.com

Khalil Amir Sharieff (born November 22, 1994) is an American R&B singer, songwriter, and rapper from Sacramento, California. At the age of 13, he was discovered by record executive L.A. Reid and signed to Def Jam Recordings in 2008. He released his debut single, "Girlfriend Ringtone", in May 2010 and its follow up, "Hey Lil Mama" (featuring Lil Twist), the following year; the former lingered on the Bubbling Under Hot 100 chart. Due to their lack of commercial response, his album Hot Like Summer was shelved indefinitely. Khalil and Def Jam labelmate Justin Bieber were closely associated; Sharieff was an accomplice to Bieber's 2014 legal encounters and public mishaps.

== Early life ==
Khalil Amir Sharieff was born on November 22, 1994, in Sacramento, California. He had a single mother who suffered from bipolar disorder, causing him to grow up in foster care until the age of nine, when he moved in with his mother after she became pregnant with his younger brother.

Khalil has stated that he would record songs on the local radio and sing them while doing chores around the house. He began posting videos of himself covering songs to YouTube, where he was discovered at the age of 13 by record producer L.A. Reid, who offered him a record deal. He then moved to Las Vegas, Nevada, and signed to Def Jam.

== Career ==
Khalil was signed to Def Jam's Teen Island label, which was created to "seize on the opportunities created by the phenomenon" of Justin Bieber. Rather than focus on making a hit single, his manager worked to "develop him into a long-term artist." While signed with Def Jam, he recorded a few singles, but did not release an album. His 2010 debut single "Girlfriend Ringtone" spent 13 weeks on Billboard's "Bubbling Under" chart but did not break onto the main Hot R&B/Hip-Hop Songs chart. His 2011 single "Hey Lil Mama", featuring Lil Twist, also charted on the Bubbling Under but did not break into the Hot 100. He parted ways with Def Jam around 2011.

Khalil is featured in three songs on Lil Twist's 2011 mixtape The Golden Child. On February 15, 2012, he released a collaborative mixtape with Lil Twist called 3 Weeks in Miami. On June 20, 2013, Khalil premiered the music video for his single "Stars" on his VEVO account.

In 2017, Khalil released his debut album, Prove It All.

== Personal life ==
On January 23, 2014, Khalil was arrested in Miami Beach, Florida, alongside Justin Bieber after they were caught racing luxury cars in a residential area while under the influence of alcohol. His bond was set at $1,000.

== Discography ==
=== Albums ===
- Hot Like Summer (shelved)
- Prove It All (2017)

=== Extended plays ===
List of mixtapes with selected details
Title	Album details
Kein Trost	Released: September 11, 2011; Label: Ghosthall; Format: Digital download

=== Mixtapes ===
List of mixtapes with selected details
Title	Album details
3 Weeks in Miami (with Lil Twist)	Released: February 12, 2012; Label: Young Money; Format: Digital download
A Long Story Short	Released: August 28, 2014; Label: Self-released; Format: Digital download

=== Singles ===
==== As lead artist ====
List of singles, with selected chart positions, showing year released and album name
Title	Year	Peak chart positions			Album
Title	Year	US	US R&B	US Rap	Album
"Girlfriend Ringtone"	2010	—	—	—	Non-album single
"Hey Lil Mama" (featuring Lil Twist)	2011	—	111	—	Non-album single
"Bands Up" (featuring Birdman)	2014	—	—	—	A Long Story Short
"Simple"	2016	—	—	—	Misunderstood
"Quality"	2016	—	—	—	Misunderstood

=== Guest appearances ===
List of non-single guest appearances, with other performing artists, showing year released and album name
Title	Year	Other artist(s)	Album
"One"	2009	Charlie Hilton	Good Food!
"Wait on Me"	2011	Lil Twist	The Golden Child
"1812"	2011	Lil Twist, Lil Za	The Golden Child
"Wassup"	2012	Jae Millz	The Virgo 4: How Nasty Can He Get
"No Lights"	2012	Jon Hope	Work in Progress

=== Music videos ===
==== As lead artist ====
List of music videos, showing year released and director
Title	Year	Director(s)
"Girlfriend Ringtone"	2010	—N/a
"Hey Lil Mama" (featuring Lil Twist)	2011	—N/a
"Stars"	2013	Josha Harris
"Zone" (featuring Lil Za)	2014	—N/a
"Playtime" (featuring Justin Bieber)	2014	—N/a
