= Tha Return =

Studio album by Lil' Zane
- Released: February 26, 2008
- Recorded: 2005–2007
- Genre: Hip hop
- Length: 46:15
- Label: U.S. Entertainment/Hollywood Fame Records
- Producer: Li'l Zane (exec.)

Lil' Zane chronology
The Big Zane Theory (2003)	Tha Return (2008)

Singles from Tha Return
- 1. "Like This" Released: January 11, 2008

Tha Return is the third studio album by American rapper Lil Zane. It was released independently on February 26, 2008.

The album failed to match the success of Zane's previous albums, and failed to enter any known music chart. Its only single, "Like This", was released in promotion, which also failed to chart. As of 2024, the album sold over 10,000 copies.

== Track listing ==
No.	Title	Length
1.	"Intro"	2:08
2.	"Like This"	3:22
3.	"Hoodstar"	4:44
4.	"Do What You Do"	4:00
5.	"Stay Talkin'"	3:48
6.	"Hush"	4:00
7.	"Helpless"	3:30
8.	"Do My Thang" (feat. Sterling)	4:14
9.	"Anywhere Part 2"	4:08
10.	"Candypaint" (feat. Chauninist)	4:18
11.	"Wish U Would" (feat. Chauninist & Ajaxx)	3:33
12.	"Hustler's Anthem" (feat. B. Hollywood)	4:31
