= Love Crimes (album) =

Studio album by Ruff Endz
- Released: August 22, 2000
- Recorded: 1999–2000
- Genres: R&B, hip hop, soul
- Label: Epic
- Producers: Edward "DJ Eddie F" Ferrell, Darren Lighty, Kip Collins, Bryan-Michael Cox, Manuel Seal, Mike Clemons, Nate Love, Nokio the N-Tity, Phil Weatherspoon, Oji Pierce, Lorenzo Straight, Charles Harrison, Leland Robinson, Cory Rooney, Dan M. Shea, Guy Roche, Khris Kellow, Stretch Armstrong

Ruff Endz chronology
Love Crimes (2000)	Someone to Love You (2002)

Professional ratings
Review scores
Source	Rating
AllMusic	3/5 stars
The Encyclopedia of Popular Music	3/5 stars
Entertainment Weekly	B−
USA Today	2.5/4 stars

Love Crimes is the debut album by the R&B duo Ruff Endz, released in 2000. It contains the singles "No More" and "Where Does Love Go from Here". It peaked at No. 52 on the Billboard 200 and No. 19 on the Top R&B/Hip-Hop Albums chart. "No More" peaked at No. 1 on the Hot R&B/Hip-Hop Songs chart.

== Production ==
The duo spent more than a year working on Love Crimes. It was produced by Manuel Seal, Nokio (of Dru Hill) and Bryan-Michael Cox, among many others.

== Critical reception ==
Entertainment Weekly wrote that "longevity will depend on funky soul stirrers like 'Where Does Love Go From Here', not on the lover man sap dominating much of this uneven debut." The Baltimore Sun thought that the album "conveys the full spectrum of heartbreak and romantic pain, from aching desire of the slow, slinky 'Missing You' to the smoldering rage of 'Are U ****in' Around'."

== Track listing ==
1. "No More" (Clifton Lighty, Darren Lighty, Balewa Muhammad) - 4:04
2. "Where Does Love Go From Here"
3. "Phone Sex"
4. "Please Don't Forget About Me"
5. "Shout Out"
6. "Are U Fuckin' Around"
7. "I'm Not Just Sayin' That, I'm Feeling That"
8. "I Apologize"
9. "Love Crimes"
10. "Saying I Love You"
11. "Missing You"
12. "The World To Me"
13. "If I Was The One"
14. "Cuban Linx 2000 (featuring Ghostface Killah & Raekwon)"
