= Whispers in the Dark (album) =

Studio album by Profyle
- Released: June 29, 1999
- Recorded: Studio 57; The Hit Factory; New York City, New York; Noontime Studios; Atlanta, Georgia
- Genre: R&B
- Length: 59:12
- Label: Motown
- Producer: Jon-John, Joe, Teddy Bishop, Soulshock & Karlin, Anthony Dent, D. Christopher Jennings & Eric Johnson, Tom Hammer, Dutch

Profyle chronology
Whispers in the Dark (1999)	Nothin' But Drama (2000)

Singles from Whispers in the Dark
- 1. "I Ain't The One" Released: 1999; 2. "Just Can't Get You Off My Mind" Released: 1999

Whispers in the Dark is the debut album by American R&B group, Profyle. This was their first album with Motown Records released on June 29, 1999.

== Track listing ==
1. Just Can't Get You Off My Mind (John Robinson, Todd Burns, Joey Elias) (4:15)
2. I Ain't The One (John Robinson, Rick Cousin, Joey Elias) (3:58)
3. Jiggy Girl (Joe Thomas, Joshua P. Thompson) (3:28)
4. Too Shady (featuring Cha Cha) (Brian Casey, Brandon Casey, Teddy Bishop, Parris Fluellen) (3:13)
5. Whispers In The Dark (Joe Thomas, Joshua P. Thompson) (4:34)
6. I Won't Cry (Wayne Hector, L. Tennant, Carsten Schack, Kenneth Karlin) (4:27)
7. Don't Be Trippin' (Teddy Bishop, Johnta Austin, Elgin Lumpkin) (4:51)
8. Can't Let Go (Anthony Dent, Kevin Hicks, Johnta Austin) (3:46)
9. Somebody Like Me (Teddy Bishop, Johnta Austin) (3:55)
10. Overjoyed (Stevie Wonder) (4:07)
11. Kick It Tonight (Joe Thomas, Jolyon Skinner, Ralph B. Stacey) (4:24)
12. Lady (Tom Hammer, Sandra St. Victor) (4:50)
13. Make Sure You're Home (featuring Joe & Chico DeBarge) (5:25)
14. I Ain't The One (Remix featuring Juvenile) (John Robinson, Todd Burns, Joey Elias, Terius Grey) (4:09)

== Personnel ==
- Profyle, Joe, Chico DeBarge, Johnta Austin, Baby Doll - background vocals
- Eric Jackson, Randy Bowland - guitar
- William Lockwood, Jr. - live brushes
- Eric Johnson - bass, keyboards
- Bryan-Michael Cox - additional keyboards
- Ed Miller, Mike Alvord, Jason Goldstein, Manny Marroquin, Bryan-Michael Cox - recording engineers
- Manny Marroqin, Earl Cohen, Bob Brockman - mixing
- Kedar Massenburg, Joe - executive producers
- Tom Coyne - mastering
- Dwayne Shaw - art direction

== Charts ==
Chart performance for Whispers in the Dark
Chart (1999)	Peak position
US Top R&B/Hip-Hop Albums (Billboard)	13
