= The Big Zane Theory =

Studio album by Zane
- Released: August 19, 2003
- Recorded: 2001–2003
- Genre: Hip hop
- Label: Priority Records/Capitol Music Group

Zane chronology
Young World: The Future (2000)	The Big Zane Theory (2003)	Tha Return (2008)

Singles from The Big Zane Theory
- 1. "Tonite I'm Yours" Released: May 20, 2003

Professional ratings
Review scores
Source	Rating
Allmusic	3/5 stars

The Big Zane Theory is the second album by rapper, Zane (formerly Lil' Zane). It was released on August 19, 2003 through Priority Records. The album failed to match the success of Zane's previous album, as it only peaked at number 191 on the Billboard 200, with first week sales of 6,423 copies. The album also charted at number 39 on the Top R&B/Hip-Hop Albums.

Its only single, "Tonite, I'm Yours" peaked at number 87 on the Hot R&B/Hip-Hop Songs chart. As of 2024, the album sold close to 40,000 copies.

== Track listing ==
No.	Title	Producer(s)	Length
1.	"Intro (Ready Or Not)"	DK All Day	2:08
2.	"Do It, Don't Stop" (feat. Envyi)	DJ Emz	3:49
3.	"Lil' Zane"	Jimi Kendrix	4:05
4.	"Bounce"	Timbaland	4:06
5.	"Tonite, I'm Yours" (feat. Tank)		4:17
6.	"Peel Out"		4:29
7.	"In The Strip Club"		1:29
8.	"Shake It"		3:50
9.	"How We Ride" (feat. Roscoe & Tristar)	Jelly Roll	4:05
10.	"All $ Ain't Good $"	Jimi Kendrix	4:06
11.	"Don't Tell"	Theron "Neff-U" Feemster	3:57
12.	"Come Runnin'" (feat. Envyi)	Theron "Neff-U" Feemster	4:28
13.	"Damn"	Stevie J	4:04
14.	"The Vision"		0:54
15.	"I.O.U." (feat. Keri Hilson)		4:48

== Singles ==
"Tonite I'm Yours" (featuring Tank)

Chart	Position
Hot R&B/Hip-Hop Songs	# 87

== Chart positions ==
Chart	Peak position
US Billboard 200	191
US Billboard R&B/Hip-Hop Albums	39
US Billboard Rap Albums	–
