= The Final Chapter (Ruff Endz album) =

Studio album by Ruff Endz
- Released: August 9, 2010 (Digital); November 23, 2010 (CD)
- Genre: R&B

Ruff Endz chronology
Greatest Hits (2003)	The Final Chapter (2010)	Soul Brothers (2018)

The Final Chapter is the third studio album by Ruff Endz.

== Track listing ==
1. "Senorita"
2. "Love U Down"
3. "Ryder"
4. "Mr. DJ"
5. "She Ain`t No Good"
6. "Love Zone"
7. "Been Waiting"
8. "What U Need"
9. "Love Potion"
10. "My Special Home"
