= Causin' Drama =

Studio album by Drama
- Released: February 8, 2000
- Recorded: 1999
- Genre: Hip hop
- Length: 35:49
- Label: Atlantic
- Producer: Shawty Redd

Singles from Causin' Drama
- 1. "Left, Right, Left" Released: October 12, 1999; 2. "Double Time (Drama's Cadence)" Released: 1999

Professional ratings
Review scores
Source	Rating
AllMusic	3/5 stars

Causin' Drama is the only studio album by American rapper Drama. It was released on February 8, 2000 through Atlantic Records. Production was handled by Shawty Redd with Drama serving as a co-producer.

The album peaked at number 32 on the Billboard 200 and number 11 on the Top R&B/Hip-Hop Albums charts in the United States. It was certified gold by the Recording Industry Association of America on March 29, 2000 for selling 500,000 copies in the US alone.

The album was supported by two singles, "Left, Right, Left" and "Double Time (Drama's Cadence)", with accompanying music videos. Its lead single, "Left, Right, Left", reached number 73 on the Billboard Hot 100, number 18 on the Hot R&B/Hip-Hop Songs, number 35 on the R&B/Hip-Hop Airplay, number 17 on the Mainstream R&B/Hip-Hop Airplay, number 2 on the Hot Rap Songs, number 14 on the Rap Airplay, number 38 on the Rhythmic Airplay and number 8 on the Hot R&B/Hip-Hop Singles Sales. The second single off of the album, "Double Time (Drama's Cadence)", failed to chart.

== Track listing ==
All tracks are written by Terence "Drama" Cook.

No.	Title	Length
1.	"Intro M.I.A."	0:53
2.	"Left, Right, Left"	3:37
3.	"It's Drastic"	3:24
4.	"Double Time" (Drama's Cadence)	3:33
5.	"The Plot"	3:39
6.	"My Name Is Drama"	3:10
7.	"Let's Go to War"	4:10
8.	"Mama, Mama"	4:48
9.	"I'm Ballin' Man"	4:30
10.	"Sir. Yes Sir."	0:29
11.	"Left, Right, Left" (Radio Edit)	3:36
Total length:		35:49

== Charts ==
=== Weekly charts ===
Chart (2000)	Peak position
US Billboard 200	32
US Top R&B/Hip-Hop Albums (Billboard)	11

=== Year-end charts ===
Chart (2000)	Position
US Billboard 200	145
US Top R&B/Hip-Hop Albums (Billboard)	57

== Certifications ==
Region	Certification	Certified units/sales
United States (RIAA)	Gold	500,000^{^}
^{^} Shipments figures based on certification alone.
