= Nothin' but Drama =

Nothin' But Drama

Studio album by Profyle
- Released: October 17, 2000
- Recorded: Unique Studios, Battery Studios, Sony Studios, Studio 57, The Weight Room; New York City, New York; Yelrahc Studios, Noontime Studios, Doppler Studios; Atlanta, Georgia; Head Up Recording; New Jersey
- Genre: R&B
- Length: 58:03
- Label: Motown
- Producer: Teddy Riley, Roy "Royalty" Hamilton, Steve "Stone" Huff, Allen "Allstar" Gordon, Greg Charley, Joe, The Characters, Troy Oliver, Stanley Brown, Teddy Bishop, Profyle

Profyle chronology
Whispers in the Dark (1999)	Nothin' But Drama (2000)

Singles from Nothin' But Drama
- 1. "Liar" Released: July 18, 2000; 2. "Damn" Released: 2000; 3. "Nasty" Released: 2000

Professional ratings
Review scores
Source	Rating
AllMusic	3/5 stars
Entertainment Weekly	C−
Vibe	3.5/5 stars

Nothin' But Drama is the second and final studio album by American R&B group Profyle, released on October 17, 2000, by Motown Records. The album peaked at number 50 on the Billboard 200 and spawned three singles: "Liar", "Damn" and "Nasty".

== Track listing ==
No.	Title	Writer(s)	Producer	Length
1.	"Liar"	Roy Hamilton • Tyrell Bing • Ernest Dixon	Teddy Riley • Roy Hamilton	4:58
2.	"(Can We) M.A.K.E. L.U.V."	Steve "Stone" Huff	Steve "Stone" Huff	4:26
3.	"Damn"	Hamilton • Bing • Ernest Dixon	Riley • Hamilton	3:24
4.	"Can We Talk (About Us)"	Huff	Huff	4:14
5.	"Nasty" (featuring Monifah)	Allen Gordon • Joe Thomas • Jolyon Skinner	Allstar	4:07
6.	"Every Little Thing"	Gregory Charley	Greg Charley	4:29
7.	"I Do"	Thomas • Joshua P. Thompson	Joe Thomas	4:21
8.	"Changes"	Charley • Johnta Austin	Charley	4:05
9.	"Can We Make Love"	Troy Taylor • Charles Farrar • Austin • Troy Oliver	The Characters • Troy Oliver	4:47
10.	"You Bring Out the Freak"	Kenneth Fambro • Antonio Mobley • Detrick Phelps • Marcus Phelps • Fred Robinson • Shanté Paige	Ken Fambro • Antonio Mobley	5:07
11.	"One Night"	Gordon • Teron Beal	Allstar	4:28
12.	"Addicted"	Fred Hicklin	Stan Brown	4:23
13.	"No Trickin'" (featuring Rasheeda)	Teddy Bishop • Austin	Teddy Bishop	3:34
14.	"Thank You (Interlude)"	Phelps • Marcus Phelps • Robinson • Donnie Wilson	Profyle	1:40
Total length:				58:36

== Personnel ==
- Kedar Massenburg - executive producer
- Shante Paige - associate executive producer
- Tom Coyne, Chris Gehringer - mastering
- Jonathan Mannion - photography
- Robert Sims - art direction

== Charts ==
Chart (2000)	Peak position
US Billboard 200	50
US Top R&B/Hip-Hop Albums (Billboard)	13
