= Left, Right, Left (song) =

Single by Drama

from the album Causin' Drama
- Released: October 12, 1999
- Recorded: 1999
- Studio: BullFrog Studios
- Genre: Hip hop; gangsta rap; crunk
- Length: 3:37
- Label: Atlantic
- Songwriter: Terence L. Cook
- Producer: Shawty Redd

Drama singles chronology
"Left, Right, Left" (1999)	"Double Time (Drama's Cadence)" (2000)

Music video
- "Left, Right, Left" on YouTube

"Left, Right, Left" (also known as "Left/Right") is a song written and performed by American rapper Drama. It was released on October 12, 1999 via Atlantic Records as the lead single off of the rapper's debut studio album Causin' Drama. Production was handled by Shawty Redd, with Raheem the Dream serving as executive producer.

Drama's "Left, Right, Left" reached number 73 on the Billboard Hot 100, number 18 on the Hot R&B/Hip-Hop Songs, number 35 on the R&B/Hip-Hop Airplay, number 17 on the Mainstream R&B/Hip-Hop Airplay, number 2 on the Hot Rap Songs, number 14 on the Rap Airplay, number 38 on the Rhythmic Airplay and number 8 on the Hot R&B/Hip-Hop Singles Sales in the United States.

== Track listing ==
CD maxi single
No.	Title	Writer(s)	Producer(s)	Length
1.	"Left/Right" (Radio)	Terence Cook	Shawty Redd
2.	"Left/Right" (Instrumental)	Cook	Shawty Redd
3.	"Left/Right" (Street w/ Intro)	Cook	Shawty Redd
4.	"Left/Right" (Street w/o Intro)	Cook	Shawty Redd
5.	"I'm Ballin' Man" (Radio)	Cook; Micaiah Raheem	Shawty Redd
6.	"I'm Ballin' Man" (Instrumental)	Cook; Raheem	Shawty Redd
7.	"I'm Ballin' Man" (Street)	Cook; Raheem	Shawty Redd

== Personnel ==
- Terence "Drama" Cook – vocals
- Demetrius Lee "Shawty Redd" Stewart – producer
- Paul Thompson – recording, engineering
- Micaiah Raheem – executive producer
- Eric Johnson – photography
- BJ Luster – layout

== Chart positions ==
=== Weekly charts ===
Chart (2000)	Peak position
US Billboard Hot 100	73
US Hot R&B/Hip-Hop Songs (Billboard)	18
US R&B/Hip-Hop Airplay (Billboard)	35
US Hot Rap Songs (Billboard)	2
US Rhythmic Airplay (Billboard)	38

=== Year-end charts ===
Chart (2000)	Position
US Hot R&B/Hip-Hop Singles & Tracks (Billboard)	70
US Hot R&B/Hip-Hop Singles Sales (Billboard)	32
US Hot Rap Singles (Billboard) (Billboard)	9
