= Liar (Profyle song) =

2000 song by Profyle

Single by Profyle

from the album Nothin' but Drama
- Released: July 18, 2000
- Recorded: 2000
- Genre: R&B
- Length: 4:57 (album version) 3:58 (radio edit)
- Label: Motown
- Songwriters: Roy Hamilton, Tyrell Bing, Ernest Dixon
- Producer: Teddy Riley

Profyle singles chronology
"Just Can't Get You Off My Mind" (1999)	"Liar" (2000)	"Damn" (2000)

Music video
- "Liar" on YouTube

"Liar" is a number-one R&B single by group Profyle, from their second studio album Nothin' but Drama (2000). The hit song spent one week at number-one on the US R&B chart and peaked at number fourteen on the US Pop chart.

== Music video ==
Directed by Terry Heller, the video features one of the band members following his girlfriend to find out that she cheated on him with another man from the streets. He surprises her when she sees her stuff outside of his home and gives him a "one-way" ticket as she sees him with a new woman holding a dog.

== Formats and track listing ==
US 12"

1. "Liar" (Main) – 4:59
2. "Liar" (Radio) – 4:00
3. "Liar" (Acappella) – 4:49
4. "Liar" (Instrumental) – 4:59

US CD Maxi-Single

1. "Liar" (Radio Edit) – 4:00
2. "Liar" (Instrumental) – 4:59
3. "Can We Talk (About Us)" – 1:34
4. "(Can We) M.A.K.E. L.U.V" – 1:22
5. "Damn" – 0:55
6. "Nasty" – 1:22
7. "I Do" – 1:28
8. "One Night" – 1:49

== Charts ==
=== Weekly charts ===
Chart (2000)	Peak position
US Billboard Hot 100	14
US Hot R&B/Hip-Hop Songs (Billboard)	1

=== Year-end charts ===
Chart (2000)	Position
US Hot R&B/Hip-Hop Songs (Billboard)	23

== See also ==
- List of number-one R&B singles of 2000 (U.S.)
