= Prove It All =

Studio album by Khalil
- Released: August 4, 2017
- Genre: R&B
- Length: 39:02
- Label: Empire
- Producer: FKi; Rex Cudo; Charlie Hansome; Idan Kalai

Khalil chronology
A Long Story Short (2014)	Prove It All (2017)

Prove It All is the debut studio album by American R&B singer Khalil. It was released on August 4, 2017, through the record label Empire.

== Background ==
HipHopDX described the album, consisting of 13 songs, as "a true solo effort" which features no guest artists. The Boombox recognized the album as "slow-burning R&B over bass-heavy beats, acoustic guitars, melodic keyboards and otherworldly sounds". Previously released songs "Pressure" and "Quality" are also included in the album. The album's lead single is "Know Enough". The album was described as having elements of 1990s R&B fused with modern sounds.

== Track listing ==
Prove It All
No.	Title	Length
1.	"Pressure"	2:14
2.	"Quality"	1:54
3.	"Simple"	3:36
4.	"No Coincidence"	2:51
5.	"Too Far"	3:06
6.	"Prove It All"	2:15
7.	"Distance"	2:38
8.	"Deserves It"	3:21
9.	"The Obvious"	3:15
10.	"Know Enough"	4:06
11.	"Hear Me Now?"	3:18
12.	"More"	3:01
13.	"Realized"	3:27
Total length:		39:02
