= You Can Do It =

1999 single by Ice Cube

Single by Ice Cube featuring Mack 10 and Ms. Toi

from the album Next Friday (soundtrack) and War & Peace Vol. 2 (The Peace Disc)
- Released: November 16, 1999
- Length: 4:19
- Label: Warner Sunset; Atlantic
- Songwriters: O'Shea Jackson; Dedrick Rolison
- Producer: One Eye

Ice Cube singles chronology
"Pushin' Weight" (1998)	"You Can Do It" (1999)	"Until We Rich" (2000)

Mack 10 singles chronology
"I Want It All" (1999)	"You Can Do It" (1999)	"Where My Gangsta's At" (2000)

Music video
- "You Can Do It" on YouTube

"You Can Do It" is a hip-hop song by American rapper Ice Cube. It was released as the second single from the Next Friday soundtrack. The song features Ice Cube's Westside Connection bandmate Mack 10, as well as rapper Ms. Toi. "You Can Do It" later used as the lead single on Cube's sixth studio album, War & Peace Vol. 2 (The Peace Disc). The song also appears on his Greatest Hits and In the Movies compilations. It would also appear on the soundtrack for the film Save the Last Dance.

The song became Ice Cube's sixth and most recent top 40 hit in the US, peaking at number 35 on the Billboard Hot 100, while also reaching number two on the Billboard Hot Rap Singles. In December 2004, the single was re-released in the UK and peaked at number two on the UK Singles Chart. It has sold 165,000 copies in the UK as of 2015.

"You Can Do It" was the one of biggest rap songs of 2000, reaching number-seven on the Billboard Year-End Hot Rap Singles of 2000.

== Charts ==
=== Weekly charts ===
Chart (1999–2000)	Peak position
US Billboard Hot 100	35
US Hot R&B/Hip-Hop Songs (Billboard)	13
US Hot Rap Songs (Billboard)	2
US Rhythmic Airplay (Billboard)	26

Chart (2004)	Peak position
UK Singles (OCC)	2
UK Hip Hop/R&B (OCC)	1

=== Year-end charts ===
Chart (2000)	Position
Billboard Hot R&B/Hip-Hop Singles & Tracks (Billboard)	83
Billboard Hot Rap Singles (Billboard)	7

Chart (2004)	Position
UK Singles (OCC)	85

== Certifications ==
Region	Certification	Certified units/sales
New Zealand (RMNZ)	2× Platinum	60,000^{‡}
United Kingdom (BPI)	Gold	400,000^{‡}
^{‡} Sales+streaming figures based on certification alone.
