= Raheem the Dream =

American rapper, record executive

Micaiah Abdul Raheem
- Born: Atlanta, Georgia, United States
- Other name: Raheem the Dream
- Musical career
- Genre: Hip Hop
- Occupations: Rapper; record executive
- Labels: Tight 2 Death Records; Breakaway Entertainment; Atlantic; Universal Music Group

Raheem the Dream (Micaiah Raheem) is an American rapper and record executive from Atlanta, Georgia, who is a pioneering artist in Atlanta's hip hop scene.

== Career ==
=== Early life ===
In high school, Raheem began MCing at talent shows. After his classmates gave him the moniker "the dream", he began to record music under the name, recording his first track in 1986 on Arvis Records. On August 3, 1986, Raheem became Atlanta's first rap artist to garner regular radio rotation in the Atlanta market when his music was put in rotation by Mitch Faulkner, Program Director of Kiss 104 FM.

=== 1990-2003: Freaknik and increased label involvement ===
By the early 1990s, Raheem's music became a symbol of the burgeoning Atlanta hip-hop scene, later receiving national airplay for single "The Most Beautiful Girl", while soundtracking Atlanta's annual Freaknik festival.

=== 2004-Present: Health problems ===
In 2004, less than a week after brokering a deal for local group Dem Franchize Boyz with Universal Records, Raheem suffered a double brain aneurysm, which left him hospitalized for 90 days and caused him to temporarily lose both his memory and motor skills.

=== Legacy ===
Throughout his career, Raheem mentored many new rappers and singers, including singer-songwriter / producer The-Dream, who reportedly asked him for permission to use his moniker.

Raheem's record "If You Ain't Got No Money" was sampled on 2007 Billboard Hot 100 number-one single "Glamorous" by Fergie and Ludacris.

In 2016, Atlanta mayor Kasim Reed awarded Raheem the Proclamation for Raheem the Dream Day, as well as the Phoenix Award (the highest honor from the Mayor’s Office) for "his outstanding contributions and groundbreaking work that helped to lay the foundation of Atlanta hip-hop music."

== Discography ==
=== Albums ===
- 1990: Grand Theft
- 1991: U Don't Know U Betta Ask Somebody
- 1995: Down South Comin' Up
- 1996: Tight 2 Def
- 1998: Tight 4 Life
- 1999: Can't Get No Tighter

=== Singles ===
- 1986: He Said She Said / Eliminator
- 1988: Work That Body
- 1991: If You Ain't Got No Money
- 1993: Girls Like That Money
- 1995: Toot That Booty
- 1998: The Most Beautiful Girl (featuring Terius "The-Dream" Nash)
- 1998: That's Right (DJ Taz featuring Raheem The Dream)
- 1998: Freak No ’Mo
- 1999: DJ Will U Please Play
- 1999: I Wanna Love You (featuring Terius "The-Dream" Nash)
