= Worldwide Entertainment =

- Founded: Kevin Wales
- Genre: Pop, hip hop, R&B
- Country of origin: United States
- Location: Atlanta, Georgia

Worldwide Entertainment is a record label founded in Atlanta, Georgia, US, by Kevin Wales. It has signed recording artists such as 112, Jagged Edge, Monica, Mario Winans, Faith Evans, B5, and Khalil.

== Current artists ==
- Khalil (Worldwide/Slip-n-Slide/Interscope Records)
- Mario Winans (Bad Boy/Worldwide/Interscope)
- Brandon Evans (Worldwide/Bad Boy)

== Former artists ==
- Lil Zane (Worldwide/Priority/Capitol) (1999 - 2002)
- B5 (band) (Worldwide/Bad Boy/Atlantic) (2001 - 2009)
- Rock City (Worldwide/Konvict/Interscope) (2005 - 2011)
- 112 (band) (Worldwide/Bad Boy/Def Jam/Arista) (1994 - 2003)
- Jagged Edge (American group) (Worldwide) (1995 - 1997)
- Monica (Worldwide) (1993 - 1995)
- Faith Evans (Worldwide) (1993 - 1995)
