= Callin' Me (Lil' Zane song) =

2000 song by Lil' Zane featuring 112

Single by Lil' Zane featuring 112

from the album Young World: The Future
- Released: June 6, 2000
- Recorded: 2000
- Studio: Silent Sound Studios, Atlanta, Georgia
- Genre: Hip hop
- Length: 4:20; 3:45 (radio edit)
- Label: Worldwide Entertainment; Priority Records
- Songwriters: Zane Copeland Jr.; Dominick Warren; Irvin Folmar; Kenneth Jones
- Producers: Mistafiss; Diggie Doms

Lil' Zane singles chronology
"Money Stretch" (1999)	"Callin' Me" (2000)	"None Tonight" (2000)

112 singles chronology
"Your Letter" (2000)	"Callin' Me" (2000)	"It's Over Now" (2000)

"Callin' Me" is a song by American rapper Lil' Zane featuring R&B group 112. It was released as the first single from his debut studio album Young World: The Future on June 6, 2000, and was produced by Diggie Doms and Mistafiss.

The song topped the Hot Rap Songs chart for 6 consecutive weeks beginning on July 15, 2000, and peaked at number 8 on the Billboard Hot Rap Songs chart and number 21 on the Hot 100 chart.

== Chart performance ==
"Callin' Me" peaked at number 21 on the Billboard Hot 100 for the week of September 2, 2000, staying on the chart for thirteen weeks. It topped the Hot Rap Songs chart for six weeks, beginning for the week of July 15, 2000. It remained on the charts for 31 weeks. The song also debuted at number 8 on the Hot R&B/Hip-Hop songs chart for the week of September 2, 2000.

== Formats and track listing ==
CD

- 1. "Callin' Me" (Radio Edit) – 3:45
- 2. "Callin' Me" (Album version) – 4:20
- 3. "Callin' Me" (Instrumental) – 4:20

CD (Promo)

- 1. "Callin' Me" (Radio Edit) – 3:45
- 2. "Callin' Me" (Instrumental) – 4:20

12"

- A1. "Main Mix" – 4:20
- B1. "Radio Version" – 3:45
- B2. "Instrumental" – 4:20

== Charts ==
=== Weekly charts ===
Chart (2000)	Peak position
US Billboard Hot 100	21
US Hot R&B/Hip-Hop Songs (Billboard)	8
US Hot Rap Songs (Billboard)	1
US Rhythmic Airplay (Billboard)	22

=== Year-end charts ===
Chart (2000)	Position
US Hot R&B/Hip-Hop Songs (Billboard)	51
