= Drama (rapper) =

American rapper (born 1981)

- Born: Terence L. Cook; December 26, 1981 (age 44)
- Origin: Atlanta, Georgia, U.S.
- Genres: Hip hop
- Occupation: Rapper
- Years active: 1995–present
- Label: Atlantic
- Website: officialdrama.com dramaatl.com

Terence L. Cook (born December 26, 1981), known professionally as Drama, is an American rapper, best known for his 1999 single "Left, Right, Left". He signed with Atlantic Records and released his debut album Causin' Drama (2000) the following year.

== Career ==
Drama was signed to Atlantic Records in 1999. He then released his debut single, "Left Right Left", which peaked at #73 on the Billboard Hot 100 and #2 on the Billboard Hot Rap Singles chart and brought him to his early fame.

Soon after the release of his debut album Causin' Drama in February 2000, Drama was jailed for violating probation and was sentenced to 90 days in prison. The album peaked at #32 on the Billboard 200 on the chart week of April 1, 2000, backed by the popularity of "Left Right Left", and went on to be certified Gold by the RIAA. He was later released from prison, with the intention of working on new music. His song "Big Ball" is featured on the Osmosis Jones soundtrack. He released an album titled Jean Wayne, on Tight 2 Def Music, on January 31, 2014.

== Arrest ==
In 2016, Drama was arrested on July 28 for calling in a bomb threat to the law firm the Parks Group, run by Real Housewives of Atlanta celebrity cast member Phaedra Parks. The threat amounted to him carrying a package and being accused of making threats in the lobby, which affected the Lenox Building, an office building in Buckhead neighborhood.

The incident was proven a hoax, and Drama was charged with making terror threats and false reports. All charges were dismissed.

== Discography ==
=== Albums ===
Year	Album	Peak chart positions		Certifications
Year	Album	U.S.	U.S. R&B	Certifications
2000	Causin' Drama: Released: February 8, 2000; Label: Atlantic	32	11	US: Gold
2014	Jean Wayne: Released: January 31, 2014; Label: Tight 2 Def Music	-	-	
2025	Redemption: Release: To be released; Label: Goreala Militia Ent.	-	-	

=== Singles ===
Year	Single	Chart positions			Album
Year	Single	U.S.	U.S. R&B	U.S. Rap	Album
1999	"Left, Right, Left"	73	18	2	Causin' Drama
2000	"Drama's Cadence (Double Time)"	—	—	—	Causin' Drama
2001	"Big Ball"	—	—	—	Osmosis Jones soundtrack
2023	"Rise Up"	—	—	—	Atlanta Falcons anthem single
2024	"Amongst the Stars"	—	—	—	Redemption, forthcoming album release in 2025
