= Pushin' Weight =

Single by Ice Cube featuring Mr. Short Khop

from the album War & Peace Vol. 1 (The War Disc)
- Released: October 13, 1998
- Recorded: 1998
- Studio: Atomic Dog Studios (Houston, TX)
- Genre: Hip hop
- Length: 4:38
- Label: Priority
- Lyricists: O'Shea Jackson; Lionel Hunt
- Producer: N.O. Joe

Ice Cube singles chronology
"We Be Clubbin'" (1997)	"Pushin' Weight" (1998)	"You Can Do It" (1999)

Mr. Short Khop singles chronology
"Pushin' Weight" (1998)	"Dollaz, Drank & Dank" (2001)

Music video
- "Pushin' Weight" on YouTube

"Pushin' Weight" is a song written and performed by American rappers Ice Cube and Mr. Short Khop. It was released on October 13, 1998, through Priority Records as the lead single from the former's fifth solo studio album War & Peace Vol. 1 (The War Disc). Recording sessions took place at Atomic Dog Studios in Houston. Production was handled by N.O. Joe. An accompanying music video was directed by Gregory Dark starring Westside Connection and Mr. Short Khop.

Domestically, the single peaked at number 26 on the Billboard Hot 100, number 12 on the Hot R&B/Hip-Hop Songs, number 42 on the R&B/Hip-Hop Airplay, number 32 on the Mainstream R&B/Hip-Hop Airplay, atop the Hot Rap Songs, number 30 on the Rhythmic Airplay, and number 7 on the Hot R&B/Hip-Hop Singles Sales. It was certified Gold by the Recording Industry Association of America on January 25, 1999, for selling 500,000 units in the US.

== Track listing ==
No.	Title	Lyrics	Music	Producer(s)	Length
1.	"Pushin' Weight" (LP Version)	O'Shea Jackson; Lionel Hunt	Joseph Johnson	N.O. Joe
2.	"Pushin' Weight" (Instrumental)		Johnson	N.O. Joe
3.	"Ghetto Vet" (LP Version)	Jackson	Stephen Anderson	Bud'da
4.	"Ghetto Vet" (Instrumental)		Anderson	Bud'da

== Personnel ==
- O'Shea "Ice Cube" Jackson – lyrics & vocals (tracks: 1, 3), mixing (tracks: 3, 4)
- Lionel "Mr. Short Khop" Hunt – lyrics & vocals (track 1), backing vocals (track 3)
- Joseph "N.O. Joe" Johnson – producer & mixing (tracks: 1, 2)
- Bob Brown – mixing (tracks: 1, 2)
- Dedrick "Mack 10" Rolison – backing vocals (track 3)
- Stephen "Bud'da" Anderson – producer & mixing (tracks: 3, 4)
- Lamont Hyde – mixing (tracks: 3, 4)

== Charts ==
Chart (1998)	Peak position
US Billboard Hot 100	26
US Hot R&B/Hip-Hop Songs (Billboard)	12
US R&B/Hip-Hop Airplay (Billboard)	42
US Hot Rap Songs (Billboard)	1

== Certifications ==
Region	Certification	Certified units/sales
United States (RIAA)	Gold	500,000^{^}
^{^} Shipments figures based on certification alone.
