= Lil Zane =

American rapper

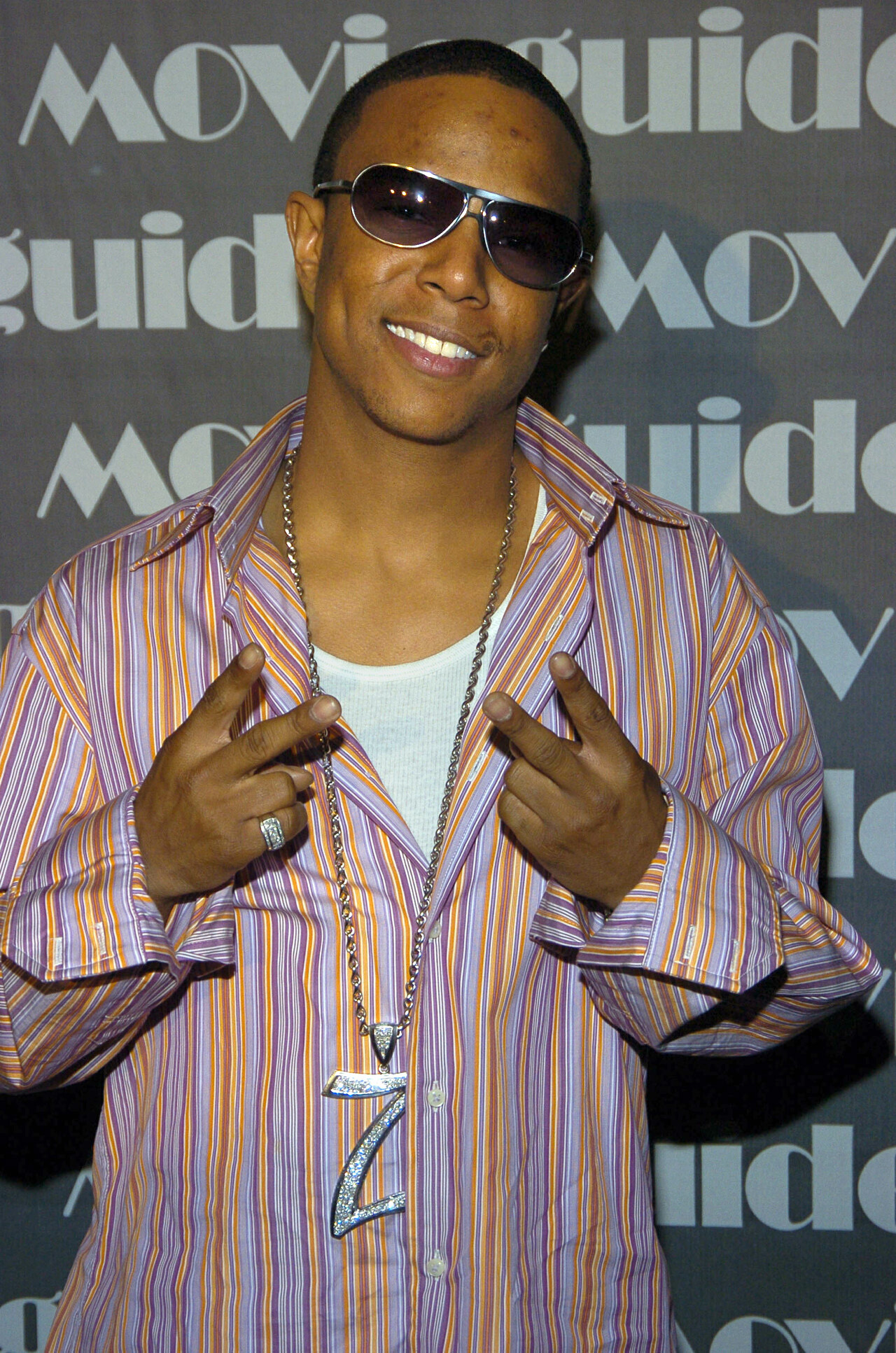
- Lil Zane in 2005

Background information
- Also known as: Zane; LZ Stunna; Life I Live Zane
- Born: Zane Copeland, Jr. July 11, 1982 (age 44); Yonkers, New York, U.S.
- Origin: Atlanta, Georgia, U.S.
- Genre: Pop-rap
- Occupations: Rapper; songwriter; actor
- Years active: 1992–present
- Labels: MMM; Hollywood Fame; Capitol; Worldwide; EMI; Priority
- Children: 2
- Website: lilzaneworld.com

Zane Copeland Jr. (born July 11, 1982), known professionally as Lil' Zane or simply Zane, is an American rapper. He is perhaps best known for his 2000 single "Callin' Me" (featuring 112), which peaked at number 20 on the Billboard Hot 100 and became his only entry on the chart. The song led him to sign with Priority Records, who released his debut studio album, Young World: The Future (2000), to moderate commercial response. The label also released Copeland's second album, The Big Zane Theory (2003), to commercial failure before parting ways with the rapper.

== Early life ==
At age of ten, Zane was inspired by Another Bad Creation and Kris Kross. He got more serious about his eventual career and started rehearsing with his cousin E. Greene. He was first recognized by his fans when he was in a group called Kronic signed to RCA Records. They were signed from 1993 to 1996. They never put out any projects. He began entering local Atlanta talent shows upon the dissolution of the group. Then in 1999, he started touring with 112 while recording his debut album.

== Music career ==
=== 1999–2002: Young World: The Future ===
In 1998, he was featured on 112's single Anywhere as his first song. In 1999, his first solo single, "Money Stretch", was released for the Next Friday soundtrack. In 2000, Lil' Zane released his debut studio album Young World: The Future, which was preceded by the 112-assisted hit song "Callin' Me". The song peaked within the top 40 of the Billboard Hot 100, while the album debuted at number 165 on the Billboard 200 with 7,000 copies sold in its first week, and peaked at number 25 in its second week with 40,000 further copies. Furthermore, it peaked at number four on the Top R&B/Hip-Hop Albums chart. By 2018, the album sold 490,000 copies. In 2001, he guest appeared alongside Bow Wow, Lil Wayne and Sammie on the song "Hardball", released for the namesake 2001 film soundtrack. He later stated in an interview that he was working on an album titled It Ain't Over, which was later changed to The Big Zane Theory.

=== 2003: The Big Zane Theory ===
In 2003, Lil Zane released his second album, The Big Zane Theory. With the album, he formally changed his stage name from Lil' Zane to simply Zane. Copeland explained "Zane is my real name, that's the name that's on my birth certificate and my mom likes that name" for changing his name in a BallerStatus.net interview. The album failed to match the success of Zane's previous album, as it charted at No. 191 on the Billboard 200's chart with 6,423 copies sold. It also charted at No. 39 on the Top R&B/Hip-Hop Albums. The only single that was released on the album was "Tonite I'm Yours" which peaked at No. 87 on the Hot R&B/Hip-Hop Songs. The album sold 40,000 copies in total soon afterwards Zane would leave Priority Records due to lack of financial compensation, artist support, and promotion to go on a five-year hiatus from music to focus on his acting career.

=== 2004–2008: Under the Radar and Tha Return ===
On December 30, 2004, it was announced that Zane has formed a new record label by the name of "3 Mill Entertainment" together with MAM Group, Inc. He announced that he had started working on his third album, Under the Radar. The album was to feature artist like Real Young, Raz B, Jon B, Bone Crusher, Akon, Drum Up (LaMar and LaNelle Seymour), and Rich Boy. The album was going to get released in Spring 2005, but then was pushed back to fall and was never released. In late 2006, Zane started to work on another new album, Tha Return. The album was released on February 26, 2008. The album failed to match the success of Zane's previous albums, as it failed to make it to any Billboard charts. The only single that was released on the album was "Like This" which also failed to chart also. The single has gotten over 150,000 views on YouTube to date and is known as Zane's comeback single.

=== 2010–present: My World: My Future ===
In 2010, he made special appearance at the ten-year anniversary of 106 & Park in Los Angeles with Ray J and Tony Marsley also known as AK. He announced he was releasing a mixtape entitled The Missing Link and a new single entitled "Put It In My Lap". March 1, 2010, Zane was featured on We Are The World: The Next Generation. The song has gotten over 2,000,000 views on YouTube alone. On March 8, 2011, Zane released a promo single off his mixtape The Missing Link Volume 1 called "Must Be Nice". On April 28, 2011, a rumor circulated that Zane signed to Cash Money Records. Later, the statement was proven false. On June 7, 2011, Zane released a new single called "My Girl". On February 2, 2012, Zane announced the title of his fourth album called My World: My Future along with a release of a single called "Sippin Hennessy" featuring Tupac Shakur. The song has gotten over 100,000 views on YouTube and 150,000 views on WorldStarHipHop alone. On May 14, 2013, Zane released a new song called "When I Get Home" featuring Young Joe which is featured on his mixtapes Champagne & Dirty Sprite and R.A.W (Raps About Women). On September 18, 2013, Zane announced that the lead single off his upcoming album is called "Roof Gone". As of January 1, 2016, it is known that Zane is now working with battle rapper Levi Fresco to help ghostwrite his upcoming single ("Don't Spill My Liquor") and album ("Life I Live").

== Other ventures ==
=== Acting career ===
Zane acted in several movies and television shows, including Cuttin' da Mustard, The Parkers, One on One, A Day in the Life, Motives, The Fighting Temptations, Dr. Dolittle 2 and Finding Forrester.

=== Money Making Muzik (MMM) ===
In 2004, Zane signed a two-year agreement with MAM Group, Inc, Inc which granted him his own record label 3 Mill Entertainment (3ME) but then changed it to U.S. Entertainment in 2006. Then in 2010, he changed it again to Money Making Muzik (MMM) after buying B1 Music Group for a significant amount of money which is yet to be disclosed. In 2010, Zane signed many talents including spotlight Florida artist Soulja P and others.

Current artists

- Lil Zane (2004–present)
- Soulja P (2011–present)
- D Phlo (2012–present)

Former artists

- Real Young (2004–2006)
- Drum Up (2005–2006)
- Miss Honey (2010–2012)
- Indyspensablz (2011–2012)
- cool Gang (2012)
- G$C (2012)
- Ya Gurl Ree (2012)
- J RockStar (2012)
- Fly High Gang (2012)

=== Other ===
Zane wrote and performed an original track as the main menu theme for the game Die Hard Trilogy 2.

== Controversy ==
=== Young Buck ===
On September 20, 2011, Lil Zane said on Street Disciplez Radio, G-Unit CEO 50 Cent would have made more money by signing him over former group member Young Buck. In addition to revealing his interest in working with 50 Cent, Zane also taunted Buck's music. "Yo, he's garbage, he's garbage," Zane told radio host EI8HT referring to Young Buck. "He's garbage though, I don't think he's a good rapper. He might be a good person but you know, he probably feels the same way about me. So the feeling's mutual, you know? But I don't think he's the best rapper. I think I would have made 50 Cent a little more money. I think 50 needs to sign me, man. I think it needs to be 50 & 60 Cent or something because I'm more like 60 Cent. You know what I'm saying?

== Discography ==
=== Studio albums ===
List of albums, with selected chart positions, sales figures and certifications
Title	Album details	Peak chart positions	
Title	Album details	US	US R&B
Young World: The Future	Released: August 22, 2000; Label: Worldwide, EMI, Priority, Capitol; Formats: CD, MD, LP	25	4
The Big Zane Theory	Released: August 19, 2003; Label: Priority, Capitol; Formats: CD, MD, LP	191	34
Under The Radar	Released: Shelved; Label: 3ME, Mass Management, MAM Group Inc, JLM Entertainment; Formats: CD, MD, LP	Shelved	
Tha Return	Released: February 26, 2008; Label: U.S., Hollywood Fame Records; Formats: CD, MD, LP	—	—
Life I Live	Released: July 11, 2018; Label: Money Making Muzik, Tunecore, Believe Music Inc; Formats: CD, MD, LP	—	—

=== Compilation albums ===
List of albums, with selected chart positions, sales figures and certifications
Title	Album details	Peak chart positions	
Title	Album details	US	US R&B
Next Friday (soundtrack)	Released: December 7, 1999; Label: Priority Records; Formats: CD, MD, LP	19	5
Cognito Presents That's My Mic	Released: July 20, 2005; Label: JLM Entertainment; Formats: CD, MD, LP	—	—

=== Mixtapes ===
Zane's mixtapes and details
Title	Mixtape details
The Missing Link Volume 1	Released: October 26, 2011; Label: Money Making Muzik; Hosted by DJ Money Baggs
R.A.W (Raps About Women) (as LZ Stunna)	Released: November 11, 2011; Label: Money Making Muzik
Magic City Radio 2.5 Summer Anthems	Released: July 7, 2012; Label: JimiBASSIX'; Hosted by DJ Jimi Bassix' and Lil Zane
Champagne & Dirty Sprite	Released: December 26, 2012; Label: Money Making Muzik; Hosted by DJ Purfiya

=== Singles ===
Main-artist singles

Year	Song	U.S. Hot 100	U.S. R&B	U.S. Rap	Album
1999	"Money Stretch"	—	122	—	Next Friday OST
2000	"Callin' Me" (featuring 112)	21	8	1	Young World: The Future
2000	"None Tonight"	—	66	2	Young World: The Future
2003	"Tonite I'm Yours" (featuring Tank)	—	87	—	The Big Zane Theory
2003	"To da River" (with T-Bone, and Montell Jordan)	—	—	—	The Fighting Temptations soundtrack
2007	"Like This"	—	—	—	Tha Return
2010	"Put It In My Lap" (featuring Tipse)	—	—	—	non-album single
2010	"So Expensive" (featuring GR Boyz)	—	—	—	The Missing Link Vol. 1
2011	"My Girl"	—	—	—	Cognito Presents That's My Mic
2013	"When I Get Home" (featuring Young Joe)	—	—	—	Champagne & Dirty Sprite / R.A.W (Raps About Women)
2015	Pussy On Fleek (featuring Jacob Latimore, Wash, LiL Scrappy)	—	—	—	No Love Lost
2022	Say Less				Boxed In Soundtrack

Promotional singles

Year	Song	Album
2000	"Ways Of The World"	Young World: The Future
2000	"Top Down"	Young World: The Future
2011	"Must Be Nice"	The Missing Link Volume 1
2011	"Why You Mad"	The Missing Link Volume 1
2011	"Stay On My Grind"	The Missing Link Volume 1
2012	"Sippin Hennessy" (featuring Tupac Shakur)	Champagne & Dirty Sprite
2012	"Don't Trust Nobody" (featuring Shawty Lo)	Champagne & Dirty Sprite
2012	"I Learned From You" (featuring Whitney Houston)	non-album single
2013	"Oh Heavenly Father"	Champagne & Dirty Sprite
2013	"Call It What You Want"	non-album single
2014	"Roof Gone"	My World My Future
2015	"Seen Alot"	No Love Lost

Featured singles

Year	Song	Chart positions			Album
Year	Song	US	US R&B	US Rap	Album
1999	"Anywhere" (with 112)	15	5	—	Room 112
1999	"Worldwide Renegade (Da Howg featuring Lil' Zane)	—	—	—	3 Strikes (film) Soundtrack
2001	"Hardball" (as Lil Rascals with Bow Wow, Lil Wayne, Sammie)	—	68	—	Hardball soundtrack
2010	"Body Rock" (Bass Rock featuring Lil' Zane)	—	—	—	non-album single
2010	"We Are The World: The Next Generation" (with H. Wood City, Brian McKnight Jr., Taylor Parks, Bobby Tinsley, Tori Kelly, Montana Tucker, Mishon, Tyna Q, Sy Sylvers, Solre, Raz B, Kristy Flores, Marcel Dion, Bobbie Riley, Deja Riley, Naturi Naughton, Porscha Coleman, Ariana Pierce, Alyxx Dione, Lil Mama, Prima J, Lil' Fizz, J-Boog, Chani, Karen Flores)	—	—	—	non-album single
2011	"De Gna (Go)" (Official Avo featuring Lil' Zane & Novva)	—	—	—	non-album single
2011	"Elevator" (Hustleman featuring Lil' Zane & J Soul)	—	—	—	non-album single
2011	"Body Rock 2" (CityStarz featuring Lil' Zane)	—	—	—	non-album single
2011	"Go Hard" (J Bigga featuring Lil' Zane)	—	—	—	non-album single
2012	"Take You There" (K-Tone featuring Lil' Zane & Ray Lavender)	—	—	—	The Real Tone Pt. 2
2013	"Motivation" (Soulja P featuring Lil' Zane)	—	—	—	The Boot Camp
2013	"When I Was 15" (Mac Trip Tha Don featuring Lil' Zane)	—	—	—	MOB Money's Everything
2014	"Pocket Watchin" (D Pholo featuring Lil' Zane, Shawty)	—	—	—	non-album single

== Filmography ==
=== Film ===
Year	Title	Role	Notes
2000	Finding Forrester	Damon	credited as Zane Copeland Jr.
2001	Dr. Dolittle 2	Eric	
2003	The Fighting Temptations	Derek	credited as Zane Copeland Jr.
2004	Motives	M'Kai	credited as Zane Copeland Jr.
2006	The Sun Will Rise	Malachi	
2007	After Autumn	Derrick Parks	
2008	Skeletons in the Desert	Marcus Jackson	
2008	Cuttin Da Mustard	Patrick	
2009	A Day in the Life	Red	
2014	The 4th Quarter	Austin Graves	TV movie
2017	Love by Chance	Travis	
2017	When Love Kills: The Falicia Blakely Story (TV Movie)	DJ Pierre	TV movie
2017	Good Streets	Ryan	
2019	The Bottom	Trap	Web Series (2 episodes)
2022	Gutter	Lil' Angry	
2022	Boxed In	Von	Peacock original

=== Television ===
Year	Title	Role	Notes
2000, 2002	The Parkers	Himself	2 episodes
2001	One on One	Himself	1 episode
2007	All of Us	n/a	1 episode
2007	Cold Case	Jester	1 episode
2008	Moonlight	Clint	1 episode
2016	Atlanta	Himself	1 episode
2021–2023	BMF	Sockie	Recurring role
2024–2026	Love & Hip Hop: Atlanta	Himself	Recurring role: Seasons 12–13
