= Profyle =

Contemporary R&B group

- Genres: R&B
- Years active: 1995–2004
- Label: Motown

Profyle was an American R&B group best known for their hit single "Liar", released in 2000.

Hailing from Shreveport, Louisiana, they were signed to Motown Records. The quartet was previously known as Under 21.

== Discography ==
=== Albums ===
- Whispers in the Dark (1999)
- Nothin' But Drama (2000)
