= No More (Ruff Endz song) =

2000 song by Ruff Endz

Single by Ruff Endz

from the album Love Crimes
- Released: June 27, 2000
- Recorded: 1999
- Genre: R&B
- Length: 4:03
- Label: Epic
- Songwriters: Edward Ferrell, Clifton Lighty, Darren Lighty, Balewa Muhammad
- Producers: Eddie F, Darren Lighty

Ruff Endz singles chronology
"If I Was The One" (2000)	"No More" (2000)	"Where Does Love Go From Here" (2000)

"No More" is the title of a number-one R&B single by group Ruff Endz. The song spent one week at number one on the US R&B chart and peaked at number five on the US pop chart. The song is the duo's best-selling and known single to date.

== Charts ==
=== Weekly charts ===
Chart (2000–2001)	Peak position
Australia (ARIA)	46
Australian Urban (ARIA)	15
Canada Dance/Urban (RPM)	19
Europe (European Hot 100 Singles)	40
Netherlands (Dutch Top 40 Tipparade)	6
Netherlands (Single Top 100)	49
Scottish Singles Sales (Official Charts)	49
Sweden (Sverigetopplistan)	52
UK Singles (Official Charts)	11
UK Dance (Official Charts)	17
UK Hip Hop/R&B (Official Charts)	3
US Billboard Hot 100	5
US Hot R&B/Hip-Hop Songs (Billboard)	1
US Pop Airplay (Billboard)	18
US Rhythmic Airplay (Billboard)	5

=== Year-end charts ===
Chart (2000)	Position
UK Urban (Music Week)	2
US Billboard Hot 100	39
US Hot R&B/Hip-Hop Songs (Billboard)	7

== Remix ==
The remix features with R.E.D.B.O.N.E., Candice, Ghostface Killah, Raekwon, Cam'ron and Puerto Rock.
