= Ruff Endz =

American contemporary R&B duo

- Origin: Baltimore, Maryland, U.S.
- Genres: R&B
- Years active: 1994–resent
- Labels: Epic; Soul Brothers Entertainment
- Members: Dante "Chi" Jordan; David "Davinch" Chance
- Website: https://www.officialruffendz.com/

Ruff Endz is an American R&B duo, consisting of members David "Davinch" Chance and Dante "Chi" Jordan from Baltimore, Maryland. They are best known for their singles "No More" and "Someone to Love You" Originally part of a quartet, the two left the group in 1994 to form the duo.

== Biography ==
After signing with Epic Records in 1999, the duo began work on their debut album. They appeared on Cam'Ron's single "Freak" that same year. In June 2000, they premiered their debut single "No More" which became a hit on the R&B and Pop charts, peaking at #5 on the Billboard Hot 100 and #1 on the R&B charts. Their debut album Love Crimes was released on August 22, 2000, peaking at #52 on the Billboard 200 and #19 on the R&B albums chart. A follow-up single "Where Does Love Go from Here" was released, yet did not chart. Shortly after, they toured and began work on their sophomore album.

In 2001, they released the first single from their second album "Cash, Money, Cars, Clothes" featuring Memphis Bleek. The single had moderate success on the R&B charts, peaking at #69 on Billboard's R&B. However, it wasn't until they released the next single, the title track "Someone To Love You" the following year, that they garnered another crossover hit, with the song hitting #49 on the Billboard Hot 100 and #12 on R&B. Their album Someone To Love You was released on May 14, 2002. It opened at #27 on the Billboard 200 and #8 on the R&B Albums chart.

Following some label issues, the group decided to take a break in 2003. A compilation album Greatest Hits was released that year, serving as their final contract release with Epic Records. Additionally, they were featured on the Ghostface Killah track "Love Session."

In 2006, David Chance began work on new projects, including Unplugged ...My Life, My Story which was due in winter 2007, along with a follow-up album called Unconditional Love which were only digital releases. Chance began doing what he calls "inspirational soul music" (gospel) with two new groups signed to his CMG Music LLC label.

Although the duo were no longer recording together, they released a previously unreleased album titled The Final Chapter for the fans, on iTunes on August 9, 2010 and physically on November 23, 2010.

The following year, the duo released The International Official Final Chapter Mixtape with DJ Mad Dogg, featuring six songs not included on the third album, and was hosted by both members of the duo.

In 2013, David Chance was in negotiations to join the reality series "Come Back Kings" with Ed Lover, Calvin Richardson, Horace Brown, Jeff Sanders, Jameio, Mr. Cheeks and Black Rob. Also this year, the duo released a new single "Wine You & Dine You" digitally, marking the final song to feature David Chance on vocals.

In 2016, the duo decided to reunite after their hometown of Baltimore erupted into a historical uprising that left their city in flames. With the city in unrest, they were compelled to record their first song entitled "Time 4 Change" a song that speaks out against injustice for their city and all cities alike.

Their song "Speak To My Heart" was featured on the 2017 FOX series "Shots Fired" in episode 7.

In 2018, they released their fourth album Soul Brothers which featured the single “Don’t Leave.”

Their fifth album Rebirth was released in 2021 led by the singles “Be the One”, “Congratulations” and “Hopeless”.

== Discography ==
=== Albums ===
- 2000: Love Crimes - #52 Billboard 200, #19 R&B
- 2002: Someone To Love You - #49 Billboard 200, #12 R&B
- 2010: The Final Chapter
- 2018: Soul Brothers
- 2021: Rebirth

=== Compilations ===
- 2003: Greatest Hits

=== Mixtapes ===
- 2011: The International Official Final Chapter Mixtape

=== Singles ===
- 1999: "Please Don't Forget About Me"
- 1999: "Freak"(Cam'Ron featuring Ruff Endz)
- 2000: "If I Was the One"
- 2000: "No More" #5 US, #1 R&B, #11 UK
- 2000: "Where Does Love Go From Here"
- 2001: "Cash, Money, Cars, Clothes" (featuring Memphis Bleek) #69 R&B
- 2002: "Someone To Love You" #49 US, #12 R&B
- 2002: "Love Session"(Ghostface Killah featuring Ruff Endz)
- 2010: "Ryder"
- 2013: "Wine You & Dine You" (featuring Beanie Man)
- 2016: "Time 4 Change"
- 2017: "Speak To My Heart"
- 2018: "Don't Leave"
- 2021: “Be The One”
- 2021: “Congratulations”
- 2021: “Hopeless”

=== Solo albums ===
- 2007: Unplugged ...My Life, My Story by David Chance
- 2009: Unconditional Love by David Chance
