= Ms. Toi =

American rapper-songwriter

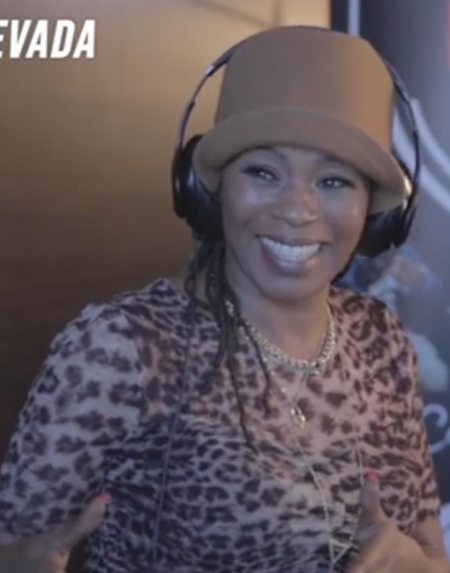
- In a 2022 interview

Background information
- Born: Toikeon Parham; February 26, 1973 (age 53); Chicago, Illinois, U.S.
- Origin: Inglewood, California, U.S.
- Genre: Hip hop
- Occupations: Rapper; songwriter
- Years active: 1999–present
- Labels: Universal, G.O Entertainment

Toikeon Parham (born February 26, 1973), known professionally as Ms. Toi, is an American rapper. She is featured on the Ice Cube song "You Can Do It" with Mack 10, released on the soundtrack albums for the feature films Next Friday and Save the Last Dance. "You Can Do It" became a major club hit in 2000, and its video received airplay on BET.

== Early life ==
Parham was born in Chicago. Her family moved to Inglewood, California, when she was 11 years old. Toi attended Inglewood High School, part of its Class of 1991. After being expelled from school, she moved to Sacramento, where she lived with an uncle and his family.

== Career ==
In Sacramento, Toi began pursuing an interest in hip hop. She performed with a group, Thick and the Girls, initially as a dancer. Her first studio recording, "Life Styles of the Rough and Sexy", was by her and Ronnie DeVoe, the nephew of her manager. She joined a rap group, Militia, and her performance on a remix of their track "Burn" led to further opportunities.

Toi's break came when she was invited to record "You Can Do It" with Ice Cube and Mack 10. The song became a hit. Toi was signed to Universal Records. Her debut album That Girl was released a year later. It features multiple West Coast rappers, including E-40 and MC Ren, along with others like Nelly and producer Dame Grease.

== Discography ==
=== Albums ===
- 2001: That Girl
- 2007: Not Yo Average Chick - Heetseekers - Middle Atlantic - No. 7
- 2009: Corporate Thug
- 2014: I Am a Warrior, Part 1
- 2014: I Am a Warrior, Part 2
- 2020: Real In The City
- 2020: Unleashed
- 2021: Vybe
- 2021: HBIC Work
- 2022: On Everythang
- 2022: Ms. Toi Presents The Session
- 2022: Roses
- 2022: From The Hip
- 2023: Rock Hop Vol.1
- 2023: Ms. Toi Presents The Session 2
- 2024: I Said What I Said
- 2025: Crash Out
- 2025: The Sesh
- 2026: Resilience
- 2026: Ms. Toi Presents The Sesh 2

=== Mixtapes ===
2017: Now That's Gangsta - Datpiff.com

=== Singles ===
- 2001: "Handclap"
- 2013: "I Am a Warrior"
- 2014: "Green Like That Green" features Ice Cube, Yukmouth and Nyce in DJ Pooh's movie Budz House
- 2014 "Do You Really Wanna Go There" (Ft Dub-C & Yeahlome), unreleased from Testimonial Game album
- 2017: "Slay"
- 2017: "Roses" featuring Klondike Kat (nominated for Female Perspective Awards Song of the Year in 2017)
- 2018: "All My Life" featuring and produced by J Pad Da Juggernaut
- 2019: "I Mean I Mean" featuring OYG Red Rum
- 2019: "Keep Up With The G.O" featuring J Pad Da Juggernaut
- 2020: "Keep Moving" (CW "All American" Season 2 Episode 14 "Who Shot Ya")
- 2020: "On Everythang" featuring B.F.L.Y
- 2020: "Everything Big"
- 2020: "Direct Deposit"
- 2020: "Track Snatched"
- 2020: "Game Wide Open"
- 2020: "No Love"
- 2020: "Supportive"
- 2020: "Bout My Issue" featuring Mr. Tan
- 2020: "Get Outta My Way" featuring Tiga Maine
- 2020: "Ready Set Win"
- 2020: "Zah Zah On Fire"
- 2021: "Weirdo's Talk"
- 2021: "About U" featuring Teddy Neutral
- 2021: "Im One of Em"
- 2021: "And I"
- 2021: "Alway's Into Something" featuring Jackie Bad
- 2021: "Who Am I" featuring Speak Lo
- 2022: "Show U"
- 2022: "Play With Me"
- 2022: "Is There A Problem"
- 2022: "Ms. Toi Roses"
- 2023: "Been There Done that"
- 2023: "Gen X" featuring K waz The Lyrical Psycho, Speak Lo, J Pad Da Juggernaut
- 2023: "Celebrate" featuring Tia P
- 2024: "We So Immortal"
- 2024: "I Said What I Said" featuring Mz Nera
- 2024: "Say My Name" featuring Sagethegoddess
- 2024: "Toiminator"
- 2024: "T N T" featuring Successful Toy
- 2025: "Been The Shit"
- 2025: "Outside Of Music"
- 2025: "Set The Tone"
- 2025: "Lungs Wide Open" featuring K waz The Lyrical Psycho, J Pad Da Juggernanut
- 2025: "Kail Haze" featuring Miss Storm
- 2026: "Elevate Ya"
- 2026: "Blaze One (Remix)" featuring Escomusic
- 2026: "Bouquets (Remix)" featuring Reed Dollaz

=== Guest appearances ===
- 1999: "You Can Do It" by Ice Cube (Also features Mack 10)
- 2011: "Crazzzy" by KiLR
