= List of 2021 films based on actual events =

This is a list of films and miniseries released in 2021 that are based on actual events. All films on this list are from American production unless indicated otherwise.

== 2021 ==
- 4 Kings (Thai: 4 KINGS อาชีวะ ยุค) (2021) – Thai crime drama film based on actual events in Thai society about the issue of quarrels among teenage vocational students which injures unrelated persons as well
- 12 Mighty Orphans (2021) – sports drama film based on the Masonic School for Orphans in Fort Worth, Texas
- 83 (2021) – Indian Hindi-language sports drama film based on the India national cricket team led by Kapil Dev, which won the 1983 Cricket World Cup
- A Dog Named Palma (Russian: Пальма) (2021) – Russian family sports drama film based on real events that took place in 1974–1976 at the Moscow's Vnukovo International Airport
- A Journal for Jordan (2021) – romantic sports drama film based on the memoir A Journal for Jordan: A Story of Love and Honor by Dana Canedy
- A Very British Scandal (2021) – British historical drama miniseries depicting the story of events surrounding the notorious divorce of the Duke and Duchess of Argyll during the 1960s
- Aik Hai Nigaar (Urdu: یک ہے نگار) (2021) – Pakistani biographical drama television film based on three-star general of Pakistan Army, Nigar Johar and centers on her life and career from 1975 (when Johar was young) to present time
- Aileen Wuornos: American Boogeywoman (2021) – horror thriller film based on the biography of serial killer Aileen Wuornos and supplemented with elements of fiction
- Al Kameen (Arabic: الكمين) (2021) – Emirati action war film based on the true story of a 2018 ambush of Emirati soldiers by insurgents
- Aline (2021) – musical comedy drama film depicting a fictionalized portrayal of the life of Céline Dion
- All Our Fears (Polish: Wszystkie nasze strachy) (2021) – Polish biographical film based on the catholic gay activist Daniel Rycharski
- All the World Is Sleeping (2021) – drama film based on the experiences of Bold Futures (formerly known as Young Women United), which is a New Mexico-based reproductive justice nonprofit organisation
- American Traitor: The Trial of Axis Sally (2021) – biographical drama film based on the life of Mildred Gillars, an American singer and actor who during World War II broadcast Nazi propaganda to US troops and their families back home
- American Underdog (2021) – biographical sports film about National Football League (NFL) quarterback Kurt Warner's journey as an undrafted player who ascended to winning Super Bowl XXXIV
- Amina (2021) – Nigerian biographical action film about the life of 16th century Zazzau empire warrior Queen Amina
- Animals (2021) – psychological thriller film based on the 2012 murder of gay man Ihsane Jarfi in Liège, the first case of homophobic violence recognized by law in Belgium
- Anita (Chinese: 梅艷芳) (2021) – Hong Kong biographical musical drama film about Cantopop star Anita Mui
- Anne Boleyn (2021) – British historical psychological thriller miniseries set in Anne's final five months prior to her execution by beheading for treason in 1536
- Asakusa Kid (Japanese: 浅草キッド) (2021) – Japanese biographical drama film based on the apprenticeship of Takeshi Kitano by Senzaburo Fukami
- The Auschwitz Report (Slovak: Správa) (2021) – Slovak biographical drama film based on the true story of Rudolf Vrba and Alfréd Wetzler, two prisoners at the Auschwitz concentration camp who manage to escape with details about the camp's operation including a label from a canister of the pesticide Zyklon-B, used in the murders there
- Badamasi (2021) – Nigerian-British biographical drama film about former Nigerian head of state, Ibrahim Badamasi Babangida
- Baggio: The Divine Ponytail (Italian: Il Divin Codino) (2021) – Italian biographical sports film based on real life events of Italian footballer Roberto Baggio
- The Battle at Lake Changjin (Chinese: 长津湖) (2021) – Chinese war drama film depicting the story of the North Korea-allied Chinese People's Volunteer Army, forcing U.S. forces to withdraw in a fictionalized retelling of the Battle of the Chosin Reservoir during the Korean War
- Being the Ricardos (2021) – biographical drama film about the relationship between I Love Lucy stars Lucille Ball and Desi Arnaz
- Benedetta (2021) – biographical drama film based on Benedetta Carlini, a novice nun in the 17th century who joins an Italian convent and has a lesbian love affair with another nun
- Benediction (2021) – historical biographical drama film about Siegfried Sassoon
- Bhuj: The Pride of India (Hindi: भुज) (2021) – Indian Hindi-language biographical film depicting the true story of Indian Air Force Squadron Leader Vijay Karnik — then in-charge of the Bhuj Air Force Base who, with the help of 300 local women, reconstructed the damaged landing strip in 72 hours
- The Big Bull (Hindi: द बिग बुल) (2021) – Indian Hindi-language financial thriller film based on stockbroker Harshad Mehta who was involved in financial crimes over a period of 10 years during 1980–1990
- The Billion Dollar Code (German: Terra Vision) (2021) – German crime thriller miniseries based on the true story of an artist and a hacker invented "ART+COM"
- Blue Miracle (2021) – drama film depicting a guardian and his kids partner with a washed-up boat captain for a chance to win a lucrative fishing competition in an attempt to save their orphanage
- Body Brokers (2021) – crime thriller film based on the true story of a recovering junkie soon learns that the rehab center is not about helping people, but a cover for a multi-billion-dollar fraud operation that enlists addicts to recruit other addicts
- Božena (2021) – Czech biographical drama miniseries about Božena Němcová
- Break Every Chain (2021) – religious biographical drama film based on the autobiographical novel of the same name by Jonathan Hickory
- Bruno Reidal (French: Bruno Reidal, Confession d'un meurtrier) (2021) – French crime drama film based on a real murder case that occurred in rural France in 1905
- The Catholic School (Italian: La scuola cattolica) (2021) – Italian thriller drama film based on the 1975 Circeo massacre
- Charlotte (2021) – Canadian-Belgian-French animated biographical drama film about German painter Charlotte Salomon
- Chernobyl: Abyss (Russian: Чернобыль) (2021) – Russian disaster film about a firefighter who becomes a liquidator during the Chernobyl disaster
- Chironjeeb Mujib (Bengali: চিরনজীব মুজিব) (2021) – Bangladeshi biographical drama film about Bangabandhu, the first President of Bangladesh and Father of the Nation
- Colin in Black & White (2021) – biographical drama miniseries depicting a dramatization of the teenage years of athlete Colin Kaepernick and the experiences that led him to become an activist
- The Colour Room (2021) – British biographical drama film based on the life of 1920s–30s ceramic artist Clarice Cliff
- Come from Away (2021) – biographical drama musical film which tells the true story of 7,000 airline passengers who were stranded in a small town in Newfoundland, where they were housed and welcomed, after the 9/11 terrorist attacks
- The Conjuring: The Devil Made Me Do It (2021) – supernatural horror film based on purportedly real-life reports that inspired The Amityville Horror story
- Creation Stories (2021) – biographical film about Alan McGee and Creation Records
- Death Saved My Life (2021) – thriller television film inspired on the story of Noela Rukundo
- Deceit (2021) – British crime drama, thriller miniseries based on the true story of a controversial undercover operation carried out by the Metropolitan Police in 1992
- The Dig (2021) – British biographical drama film reimagining the events of the 1939 excavation of Sutton Hoo
- Dopesick (2021) – drama miniseries on "the epicenter of America's struggle with opioid addiction" across the U.S., on how individuals and families are affected by it, on the alleged conflicts of interest involving Purdue Pharma and various government agencies
- Dr. Gama (Portuguese: Doutor Gama) (2021) – Brazilian biographical drama film based on the life of the abolitionist lawyer and writer Luís Gama, one of the most important figures in Brazilian history
- Edge of the World (2021) – adventure drama film based on the British soldier and adventurer James Brooke
- Eiffel (2021) – French romantic drama film depicting the life of Gustave Eiffel
- The Electrical Life of Louis Wain (2021) – British biographical film depicting the life of British painter Louis Wain
- Elk*rtuk (Hungarian: A hazugság ára) (2021) – Hungarian political action thriller film centered around the 2006 Öszöd speech, made by former Hungarian Prime Minister Ferenc Gyurcsány, the leaking of said speech, and its subsequent consequences
- Escape from Mogadishu (Korean: 모가디슈) (2021) – South Korean action drama film set during the Somali Civil War and the two Koreas' efforts to be admitted to the United Nations in the late 1980s and early 1990s
- Everybody's Talking About Jamie (2021) – biographical coming-of-age musical comedy drama film based upon the true-life story of 16-year-old British schoolboy Jamie Campbell, as he overcomes prejudice and bullying, to step out of the darkness and become a drag queen
- Everything Went Fine (French: Tout s'est bien passé) (2021) – French drama film about a young woman as she is confronted with her father's declining health, and his request for her help in committing medically assisted suicide
- The Eyes of Tammy Faye (2021) – biographical drama film depicting the history of controversial televangelists Tammy Faye Bakker and Jim Bakker
- Firebird (2021) – romantic drama film based on the memoir The Story of Roman by Sergey Fetisov, which is set during the Cold War
- Flag Day (2021) – drama film depicting the daughter of a con artist struggles to come to terms with her father's past, involving the fourth-largest seizure of counterfeit bills in U.S. history, nearly $20 million Based on Jennifer Vogel's 2004 book, Flim-Flam Man : A True Family History.
- Halston (2021) – biographical drama miniseries based on the life of designer Halston
- Hive (Albanian: Zgjoi) (2021) – Kosovan drama film about a woman, Fahrije, with a missing husband, who becomes an entrepreneur and starts selling her own ajvar and honey, recruiting other women in the process
- House of Gucci (2021) – biographical crime drama film following Patrizia Reggiani and Maurizio Gucci as their romance transforms into a fight for control of the Italian fashion brand Gucci
- I Am All Girls (2021) – South African mystery thriller film depicting a special crimes investigator forms an unlikely bond with a serial killer to bring down a global child sex trafficking syndicate
- I Am Zlatan (Swedish: Jag är Zlatan) (2021) – Swedish biographical sports drama film about Swedish footballer, Zlatan Ibrahimović
- Impeachment: American Crime Story (2021) – biographical drama miniseries portraying the Clinton–Lewinsky scandal and subsequent impeachment of Clinton
- Judas and the Black Messiah (2021) – biographical drama film about the betrayal of Fred Hampton, chairman of the Illinois chapter of the Black Panther Party in late-1960s Chicago, at the hands of William O'Neal, an FBI informant
- Jump!! The Heroes Behind the Gold (Japanese: ヒノマルソウル〜舞台裏の英雄たち〜) (2021) – Japanese sports drama film based on a true story of the test jumpers for the ski jumping event at the 1998 Winter Olympics, who were instrumental in giving Japan a chance at winning the gold medal
- Kadet 1947 (2021) – Indonesian biographical war film inspired by the first air raid mission of the Indonesian Air Force carried out by cadets on Dutch defense bases in Semarang, Salatiga, and Ambarawa on 29 July 1947 during the Police Actions
- The King of Laughter (Italian: Qui rido io) (2021) – Italian-Spanish biographical drama film about actor and playwright Eduardo Scarpetta's legal battle against Gabriele D'Annunzio
- King Richard (2021) – biographical drama film that follows the life of Richard Williams, the father and coach of famed tennis players Venus and Serena Williams
- Kurup (Malayalam: കുറുപ്പ്) (2021) – Indian Malayalam-language biographical drama film of Sukumara Kurup, a wanted notorious criminal from the Indian state of Kerala
- The Lady of Heaven (2021) – British epic historical drama film on the life of the historical figure, Fatimah, during and after the era of the Islamic prophet Muhammad
- Landscapers (2021) – British true crime black comedy-drama miniseries based on the true story of the 1998 murders of William and Patricia Wycherley
- Lansky (2021) – biographical crime drama film about the famous gangster Meyer Lansky
- The Last Duel (2021) – historical drama film following Jean de Carrouges, a knight who challenges his friend and squire Jacques Le Gris to a duel after Carrouges's wife, Marguerite, accuses Le Gris of raping her
- Leave No Traces (Polish: Żeby nie było śladów) (2021) – Polish drama film based on the state-sanctioned murder of high school student Grzegorz Przemyk
- Madame Claude (2021) – French biographical drama film about the infamous French brothel-keeper Madame Claude
- Maid (2021) – biographical drama miniseries inspired by New York Times best-selling memoir Maid: Hard Work, Low Pay, and a Mother's Will to Survive by Stephanie Land which tells the story of Land's experience of working as a maid walking the tightrope of poverty and homelessness for years chasing the American dream
- Man of God (Greek: Ο Άνθρωπος του Θεού) (2021) – Greek biographical drama film depicting the trials and tribulations of Saint Nektarios of Aegina, as he bears the unjust hatred of his enemies while preaching the Word of God
- Maradona: Blessed Dream (Spanish: Maradona, sueño bendito) (2021) – Argentine biographical drama miniseries following the controversial life of legendary footballer Diego Armando Maradona
- Marakkar: Lion of the Arabian Sea (Malayalam: മരക്കാർ: അറബിക്കടലിൻ്റെ സിംഹം) (2021) – Indian Malayalam-language epic war film based on the fourth Kunjali Marakkar named Muhammad Ali, the admiral of the fleet of the Zamorin
- Margrete: Queen of the North (Danish: Margrete den Første) (2021) – Danish historical drama film based on the 'False Oluf', an impostor who in 1402 claimed to be the deceased King Olaf II/Olav IV of Denmark-Norway, son of the title character Margrete I of Denmark
- The Mauritanian (2021) – British-American legal thriller film following Mauritanian Mohamedou Ould Salahi, who was captured by the U.S. government and detained in Guantanamo Bay detention camp without charge or trial
- Mediterraneo: The Law of the Sea (Spanish: Mediterráneo) (2021) – Spanish-Greek drama film dramatizing the genesis of the Open Arms rescue vessel by Òscar Camps
- The Most Reluctant Convert (2021) – British biographical drama film about the life and conversion of British writer and lay theologian C. S. Lewis, author of The Chronicles of Narnia series
- Mumbai Diaries 26/11 (2021) – Indian Hindi-language medical drama miniseries set during the 2008 Mumbai attacks, it follows the staff of Bombay General Hospital and their travails during the fateful night of 26 November 2008
- Nitram (2021) – Australian biographical psychological drama film based on Martin Bryant, and the events leading to his involvement in the 1996 Port Arthur massacre in Tasmania, Australia
- No Man of God (2021) – crime mystery film based on real life transcripts selected from conversations between serial killer Ted Bundy and FBI Special Agent Bill Hagmaier that happened between 1984 and 1989
- Nyaay: The Justice (Hindi: न्याय) (2021) – Indian Hindi-language biographical drama film based on Sushant Singh Rajput and Rhea Chakraborty
- Onoda: 10,000 Nights in the Jungle (French: Onoda, 10 000 nuits dans la jungle) (2021) – French biographical drama film about Hiroo Onoda, a Japanese soldier who refused to believe that World War II had ended and continued to fight on a remote Philippine island until 1974
- Oslo (2021) – political drama television film about the secret negotiation of the Oslo Accords
- Paper (Hindi: काग़ज़) (2021) – Indian Hindi-language biographical comedy film based on the life and struggle of Lal Bihari, a farmer from the small village of Amilo Mubarakpur, who was declared dead on official papers
- Passport to Freedom (Portuguese: Passaporte para Liberdade) (2021) – Brazilian drama miniseries telling the story of Aracy de Carvalho, an employee of the Brazilian consulate in Hamburg, Germany
- The Pembrokeshire Murders (2021) – British crime thriller miniseries based on the Pembrokeshire murders by Welsh serial killer John Cooper
- The Phantom of the Open (2021) – British biographical comedy drama film based on the life and career of Maurice Flitcroft
- The Pilot. A Battle for Survival (Russian: Лётчик) (2021) – Russian war film based on the real story of pilot Aleksey Maresyev
- Potato Dreams of America (2021) – autobiographical coming-of-age comedy film about a gay boy growing up in the Soviet Union, his mail-order-bride mother, and their adventurous escape to America
- Respect (2021) – biographical drama film based on the life of American singer Aretha Franklin
- The Roubal Case (Czech: Případ Roubal)(2021) – Czech crime miniseries inspired by the real events surrounding serial killer Ivan Roubal
- Saina (Hindi: साइना) (2021) – Indian Hindi-language biographical sports film based on the life of badminton player Saina Nehwal
- Sardar Udham (Hindi: सरदार उधम) (2021) – Indian Hindi-language biographical historical drama film based on the life of Udham Singh Kamboj, a freedom fighter from Punjab who assassinated Michael O'Dwyer in London to avenge the 1919 Jallianwala Bagh massacre in Amritsar
- The Serpent (2021) – British crime drama miniseries based on the crimes of serial killer Charles Sobhraj, who murdered young tourists between 1975 and 1976
- Shershaah (Hindi: शेरशाह) (2021) – Indian Hindi-language biographical war film following the life of Param Vir Chakra-awardee Captain Vikram Batra, from his first posting in the army to his death in the Kargil War
- The Shrink Next Door (2021) – psychological black comedy drama miniseries based on the real life story of psychiatrist Isaac Herschkopf, who in 2021 was determined by New York's Department of Health to have violated "minimal acceptable standards of care in the psychotherapeutic relationship"
- Sky (Russian: Небо) (2021) – Russian aviation action war film about the Russian military pilots in Syria, and the 2015 shootdown of an Su-24 over Turkey-Syrian airspace
- Somos. (2021) – Mexican drama miniseries depicting the story of the massacre perpetrated by the Los Zetas cartel on the border town of Allende, Coahuila, in 2011
- Spencer (2021) – biographical psychological drama film about Diana, Princess of Wales (née Spencer), and following Diana's decision to end her marriage to Prince Charles and leave the British royal family
- The Summit of the Gods (French: Le Sommet des Dieux) (2021) – French animated adventure drama film about George Mallory and Andrew Irvine and their attempt to climb Mount Everest
- The Survivor (2021) – biographical drama film depicting the story of Harry Haft, a real-life survivor of the Auschwitz concentration camp, where he boxed fellow inmates to survive
- Ted Bundy: American Boogeyman (2021) – historical crime film concerning the murders committed by serial killer Ted Bundy in the 1970s and the subsequent manhunt to apprehend him, led by FBI agents Kathleen McChesney and Robert Ressler
- Ted K (2021) – historical crime drama film depicting the true story of Ted Kaczynski, otherwise known as the Unabomber, and the events leading to his arrest
- Thalaivii (Tamil: தலைவி) (2021) – Indian Tamil-language biographical drama film based on the life of Indian actress-politician J. Jayalalithaa
- Three Families (2021) – British drama miniseries set in Northern Ireland between 2013 and 2019 when abortion was de facto decriminalised
- Three Souls (Spanish: Tres almas) (2021) – Chilean Western drama film telling the story of the Quispe sisters
- Tick, Tick... Boom! (2021) – biographical musical drama film based on the stage musical of the same name by Jonathan Larson, a semi-autobiographical story about Larson's writing a musical to enter the industry
- To Olivia (2021) – British drama film depicting the true story of Roald Dahl and Patricia Neal as they grapple with the loss of their daughter, Olivia
- Under the Stadium Lights (2021) – sports drama film based on the nonfiction book Brother's Keeper by Al Pickett and Chad Mitchell, about the players, coach, and team chaplain of a high school football team in Abilene, Texas in 2009
- The United States vs. Billie Holiday (2021) – biographical film about singer Billie Holiday, based on the book Chasing the Scream: The First and Last Days of the War on Drugs by Johann Hari
- Valiant Hearts (French: Cœurs vaillants) (2021) – French-Belgian war drama film based on the real-life story of director Mona Achache's grandmother, Suzanne Achache–Wiznitzer, who was a Jewish child placed in foster care to escape the Holocaust
- V2. Escape from Hell (Russian: Девятаев) (2021) – Russian prison action thriller war film based on Mikhail Devyatayev in the Great Patriotic War
- The War Below (2021) – British war film about a group of British miners (known as "Claykickers" or "Manchester Moles") recruited during World War I to tunnel underneath no man's land and set bombs below the German front at the Battle of Messines in 1917
- Wendy Williams: The Movie (2021) – biographical drama television film based on the life of entertainer Wendy Williams
- Zátopek (2021) – Czech biographical drama film depicting the life and career of Emil Zátopek
- Zero to Hero (Chinese: 媽媽的神奇小子) (2021) – Hong Kong biographical drama film about So Wa Wai, Hong Kong's first athlete to win gold at the Paralympic Games
