= Anthony Dent =

American songwriter and producer

- Genres: R&B; soul; hip-hop
- Occupations: Songwriter; producer
- Label: State Of Mind Muzic Inc. / Bad Boy Records

Anthony Dwayne Dent is an American record producer who served as in-house talent for the Hitmen, a branch of Puff Daddy's Bad Boy Records, from 1997 to 2004. He is credited with having co-produced the Billboard Hot 100-top 20 singles "Survivor" for Destiny's Child and "Friend of Mine" for Kelly Price, as well as discovering and mentoring then-unknown singer Keri Hilson. He is the founder of State of Mind Muzic, a music production outfit.

== Songwriting and production credits ==
Credits are courtesy of Discogs, Tidal, Apple Music, and AllMusic.

Title	Year	Artist	Album
"Real Niggaz" (Featuring Too Short)	1997	Jay-Z	In My Lifetime, Vol. 1
"Everybody Wants a Name"	1997	Big Mike	Still Serious
"I Love You Baby" (Featuring Black Rob)	1997	Puff Daddy	No Way Out
"It's Alright"	1997	Too Short & UGK	Dangerous Ground: The Soundtrack
"Friend of Mine"	1998	Kelly Price	Soul of a Woman
"Friend of Mine (Remix)" (Featuring R. Kelly & Ronald Isley)	1998	Kelly Price	Soul of a Woman
"Sunny Days"	1998	Faith Evans	Keep the Faith
"Keep the Faith"	1998	Faith Evans	Keep the Faith
"The Time Is Now (Intro)" (Featuring Missy Elliott)	1998	Nicole Wray	Make It Hot
"Traffic Jam (Interlude)"	1998	Nicole Wray	Make It Hot
"Pressure (Interlude)"	1998	Nicole Wray	Make It Hot
"Without You"	1998	Nicole Wray	Why Do Fools Fall in Love: The Soundtrack
"They Never Saw Me Coming"	1998	TQ	They Never Saw Me Coming
"If"	1999	Case	Personal Conversation
"Liar Liar"	1999	LaTocha Scott	The Best Man: The Soundtrack
"Dear Diary" (Featuring LaTocha Scott)	1999	Cha Cha	Dear Diary
"Lucky Day"	1999	Trā-Knox	Wild Wild West: The Soundtrack
"Doin' My Thang"	1999	Shanice	Shanice
"Is This the End? (Part Two)" (Featuring Twista)	1999	Puff Daddy	Forever
"Can't Let Go"	1999	Profyle	Whispers in the Dark
"All My Dogs" (Featuring Jamal & Keith Murray)	1999	N.E.W.S.	North East West South
"Come to Me"	2000	Carl Thomas	Emotional
"M.O.N.E.Y."	2000	Lil Zane	Young World: The Future
"Too Hot to Stop"	2000	Lil Zane	Young World: The Future
"Ride & Shake"	2000	Mya	Fear of Flying
"Road Dawgs" (Featuring Jay-Z, Eve, Amil & Da Brat)	2000	DJ Clue	Backstage: Music Inspired by the Film
"Survivor"	2001	Destiny's Child	Survivor
"Nasty Girl"	2001	Destiny's Child	Survivor
"Stop"	2001	DeLeon	Straight From The Heart
"Don't Hate Me" (Featuring Twista)	2001	112	Part III
"Single for the Rest of My Life"	2002	Isyss	The Way We Do
"Give It to Me"	2003	112	Hot & Wet
"What Would You Do"	2003	Kelly Rowland	Simply Deep
"Bounce Back"	2003	Stacie Orrico	Stacie Orrico
"Tell Me Why"	2005	8Ball & MJG	Hustle & Flow: The Soundtrack
"Necessary Thing"	2005	Zena	All Of Me
"Is It Me"	2006	Stacie Orrico	Beautiful Awakening
"She Got Me"	2006	Mario Vazquez	Mario Vazquez
"The Inspiration (Follow Me)"	2006	Jeezy	Thug Motivation 102: The Inspiration
"Thanks for the Misery"	2006	Monica	The Makings of Me
"Tonight" (Featuring Cham)	2006	Keke Palmer	Night at the Museum: The Soundtrack
"Hood Anthem"	2007	Keke Palmer	So Uncool

== Guest appearances ==
List of guest appearances, with other performing artists, showing year released and album name
Title	Year	Other performer(s)	Album
"Curiosity"	1998	Nicole Wray, Lil' Mo	Make It Hot

== Awards and nominations ==
Year	Ceremony	Award	Result	Ref
1999	ASCAP Rhythm & Soul Awards	Award-Winning Songs (Friend of Mine)	Won	
2002	ASCAP Pop Music Awards	Pop Music Awards Honorees (Survivor)	Won	
