= 2002 Soul Train Lady of Soul Awards =

American awards show

Soul Train Lady of Soul Awards
- Date: August 24, 2002
- Location: Pasadena Civic Auditorium, Pasadena, California
- Country: United States

Highlights
- Most awards: Aaliyah (2), Destiny's Child (2)

The 2002 Soul Train Lady of Soul Awards were held on August 24, 2002 at the Pasadena Civic Auditorium in Pasadena, California. The eighth annual awards program was hosted by Arsenio Hall, Jill Scott, and Shemar Moore. Winners were determined by an unspecified group of radio programmers, recording artists and music retail employees.

== Special awards ==
=== Aretha Franklin Award for Entertainer of the Year ===
- Ashanti

=== Lena Horne Award for Outstanding Career Achievement ===
- Angela Bassett

== Winners and nominees ==
Winners are in bold text.

=== Best R&B/Soul Single – Solo ===
- **Aaliyah – "Rock the Boat"**
  - Alicia Keys – "A Woman's Worth"
  - Ashanti – "Foolish"
  - India.Arie – "Brown Skin"

=== Best R&B/Soul Single – Group, Band or Duo ===
- **Destiny's Child – "Emotion"**
  - 702 – "Pootie Tangin'"
  - Exhale – "Chillin' in Your Benz"
  - Isyss featuring Jadakiss – "Day & Night"

=== R&B/Soul Album of the Year – Solo ===
- **Alicia Keys – Songs in A Minor**
  - Aaliyah – Aaliyah
  - Ashanti – Ashanti
  - Mary J. Blige – No More Drama

=== R&B/Soul Album of the Year – Group, Band or Duo ===
- **Destiny's Child – Survivor**
  - Allure – Sunny Days

=== Best R&B/Soul or Rap New Artist – Solo ===
- **Ashanti – "Foolish"**
  - Keke Wyatt featuring Avant – "Nothing in This World"
  - Truth Hurts featuring Rakim – "Addictive'"
  - Tweet – "Oops (Oh My)"

=== Best R&B/Soul or Rap New Artist – Group, Band or Duo ===
- **Isyss featuring Jadakiss – "Day & Night"**
  - Damozel – "Everyday’s a Party"
  - Exhale – "Still Not Over You"

=== R&B/Soul or Rap Song of the Year ===
- **Aaliyah – "Rock the Boat"**
  - Alicia Keys – "Fallin'"
  - Ashanti – "Foolish"
  - Mary J. Blige – "Family Affair"

=== Best R&B/Soul or Rap Music Video ===
- **Missy "Misdemeanor" Elliott – "One Minute Man"**
  - Aaliyah – "Rock the Boat"
  - Ashanti – "Foolish"
  - Trina – "Told Y'All"

=== Best Gospel Album ===
- **CeCe Winans – CeCe Winans**
  - Helen Baylor – My Everything
  - LaShun Pace – God Is Faithful
  - Yolanda Adams – Believe
