= Convicts (Convicts album) =

Studio album by Mr. 3-2 & Big Mike
- Released: June 1, 1991
- Recorded: 1991
- Genre: Gangsta rap
- Length: 58:25
- Label: Rap-A-Lot Records
- Producers: Cliff Blodget (exec.); J. Prince (also exec.); Crazy C; Doug King; John Bido; Johnny C

Big Mike chronology
| Convicts (1991) | Somethin' Serious (1994) |

Mr. 3-2 chronology
| Convicts (1991) | Secrets of the Hidden Temple (1994) |

Singles from Convicts
- 1. "This is for the Convicts / Wash Your Ass" Released: 1991

Professional ratings
Review scores
| Source | Rating |
|---|---|
| AllMusic | 1.5/5 stars |

Convicts is the only studio album by American hip hop duo the Convicts, consisted of rappers Lord 3-2 and Big Mike. It was released in 1991 through Rap-A-Lot Records. It features guest appearances from James Prince, Kim "Choice" Davis and Geto Boys. The album peaked at number 52 on the US Billboard Top R&B/Hip-Hop Albums.

== Track listing ==
| No. | Title | Length |
|---|---|---|
| 1. | "Free World" | 4:23 |
| 2. | "Peter Man" | 6:46 |
| 3. | "This Is for the Convicts" | 3:47 |
| 4. | "Fuck School" | 4:22 |
| 5. | "Penitentiary Blues" (featuring J. Prince) | 5:02 |
| 6. | "1-900-Dial-A-Crook" (featuring J. Prince & Geto Boys) | 7:06 |
| 7. | "Whoop Her Ass" (featuring Choice) | 4:35 |
| 8. | "I Ain't Going Back" | 4:10 |
| 9. | "I Love Boning" | 4:24 |
| 10. | "DOA" | 4:01 |
| 11. | "Wash Your Ass" | 3:27 |
| 12. | "Illegal Aliens" | 6:22 |

Sampled credits

- Track 1 contains elements from "Get Me Back on Time, Engine #9" by Wilson Pickett
- Track 2 contains elements from "Get Off My Dick and Tell Yo Bitch to Come Here" by Ice Cube
- Track 3 contains elements from "Brandy" by The O'Jays, "Son of Slide" by Slave, "Think (About It)" by Lyn Collins, "Give It Up or Turnit a Loose (Remix)" by James Brown
- Track 4 contains elements from "Damn" by The Nite-Liters
- Track 5 contains elements from "Three Little Birds" by Bob Marley & The Wailers, "In the Hole" by The Bar-Kays, "Be Alright" by Zapp
- Track 6 contains elements from "Sing a Simple Song" by Sly & the Family Stone, "Uphill Peace of Mind" by Kid Dynamite, "UFO" by ESG, "Devil With the Bust" by Sound Experience, "The Traffic Cop (Dance)" by Bloodstone, "Popcorn With a Feeling" by James Brown, "Jam on the Groove" by Ralph MacDonald
- Track 7 contains elements from "One Man Band (Plays All Alone)" by Monk Higgins & The Specialties, "All Because" by Al Green
- Track 8 contains elements from "Lawdy Mama" by Ernie K-Doe, "Gangsta Gangsta" and "Fuck tha Police" by N.W.A.
- Track 9 contains elements from "Funky Drummer" and "Funky President (People It's Bad)" by James Brown
- Track 10 contains elements from "Dance With the Devil" by Big Daddy Kane, "Kissing My Love" by Bill Withers
- Track 12 contains elements from "Inner City Blues (Make Me Wanna Holler)" by Marvin Gaye, "Movin'" by Brass Construction, "Good Old Music" by Funkadelic

== Personnel ==
- Christopher Juel Barriere – main artist
- Michael Barnett – main artist
- James A. Smith – featured artist (tracks: 5, 6), producer, executive producer, management
- Geto Boys – featured artists (track 6)
- Kim Davis – featured artist (track 7)
- Collins "DJ Ready Red" Leysath – scratches
- Doug King – producer
- John Okuribido – producer
- Johnny C – producer
- Simon Cullins – producer
- Cliff Blodget – executive producer
- Tony Randle – production coordinator, management

== Charts ==
| Chart (1991) | Peak position |
|---|---|
| US Top R&B/Hip-Hop Albums (Billboard) | 52 |
