= Daniel Bonjour =

South African actor

- Born: September 28, 1981 (age 45); Johannesburg, South Africa
- Education: Boston College
- Occupations: Actor, director, screenwriter,
- Years active: 2007–present
- Spouse: Jelly Howie (m. 2014)
- Children: 2

Daniel Bonjour (born September 28, 1981) is a South Africa–born actor, director and screenwriter best known for his roles in The Walking Dead, Frequency, and iZombie.

== Early life ==
Bonjour was born in Johannesburg, South Africa. His father is South African commercial editor and director who worked under the name Trevor Hill and his mother is Swiss. He moved with his family to Switzerland at the age of five and returned to South Africa at eight. At the age of 12, his family relocated to Seattle, Washington. He attended Mercer Island High School and graduated from Boston College.

== Career ==
Daniel starred in his first movie when he was 12, but did not continue his career until 2007, starring predominantly in indie films and landing his first role as series regular in the science-fiction series RCVR, for which he received the Best Actor Award from the International Academy of Web Television. In 2016, Daniel was cast as Daniel Lawrence in the CW series Frequency opposite Peyton List and Mekhi Phifer.

Daniel was the first winner of the International Academy of Web Television for Male Actor in a Drama in 2013.

Frequency was the first project in which he performed in his native South African accent.

Daniel is also a writer and the grand prize winner of the Final Draft Screenwriting competition, having won the feature-film category in 2015.

He has worked on several award-winning video games, including the Hitman series, Final Fantasy, and Life is Strange.

== Personal life ==
Daniel is married to actress Jelly Howie. They have two children, a son named Brixton Riot Bonjour and a daughter named Charli Rainbow Bonjour. Daniel has one brother named Pascal who lives in Seattle, as do both his parents. He was forced to leave his honeymoon with Jelly Howie in Thailand to fly to Atlanta to film The Walking Dead.

People included Daniel as one of Hollywood's hottest up-and-comers in their Ones to Watch category.

== Filmography ==
=== Film ===
Year	Title	Role	Director
2008	Midnight Movie	Josh	Jack Messit
2008	Allan Quatermain and the Temple of Skulls	Sir Henry	Mark Atkins
2008	Bram Stoker's Dracula's Guest	German captain	
2009	Dragonquest	Arkadi	
2013	Ambushed	Frank	Giorgio Serefino
2016	After the Rain	Ryan	Daniel Bonjour
2021	Venus as a Boy	Johnny	Ty Hodges

=== Television ===
Year	Title	Role	Notes
2011	RCVR	Webber	Star
2011	CSI: NY	Derby Chasen	Episode: "Food for Thought"
2015	The Walking Dead	Aiden Monroe	Recurring cast (2 episodes)
2015	Satisfaction	Julian	Two episodes
2016	Teen Wolf	Marcel	Episode: "Maid of Gévaudan"
2016–17	Frequency	Daniel Lawrence	Main cast (9 episodes)
2016–17	Flaked	David	Two episodes
2017–18	iZombie	Levon Patch	Recurring cast (8 episodes)
2018	Magnum P.I.	John Gilbert	Episode: "May the Best One Win"
2023	Quantum Leap	Trevor Dunn	Episode: "Fellow Travlers"
2023	Black Cake	Marc	Recurring cast (3 episodes)
2024	The Rookie	Detective Pierson	Two episodes
2025	The Cleaning Lady	Dr. Sean Dupont	Recurring cast
2026	Cyberpunk: Edgerunners 2	Meshuga (voice)	English dub

=== Video games ===
Year	Title	Role	Notes
2012	Hitman: Absolution	Landon Metcalf, Mason McCready, Dexter Goon, Wade Goon	
2014	Lightning Returns: Final Fantasy XIII	Additional voices	
2015	Life Is Strange	Frank Bowers, R.J. MacReady	
2016	Hitman	Kalvin Ritter, Cilas Netzke, Max Decker, Erik Olander, Fortune Teller, Almos Dexter, Salvatore Bravuomo, additional voices	
2016	Final Fantasy XV	Additional voices	
2022	Tactics Ogre: Reborn	Leonar Reci Rimon	
2025	Doom: The Dark Ages	Deag Loric	
2025	Dune: Awakening	Zantara	
2026	Cyberpunk 2077	Meshuga	Version 2.5 as a tie-in with Cyberpunk: Edgerunners 2
