= Miles from Home (2006 film) =

- Directed by: Ty Hodges
- Written by: Ty Hodges
- Produced by: Meagan Good; Marlon Olliverre; Ty Hodges; Todd Segal
- Starring: Ty Hodges
- Cinematography: Todd Segal
- Edited by: Todd Segal
- Music by: Jesse White
- Production company: Wonderboy
- Distributed by: Freedom Bridge Entertainment; Onpoint Prods.
- Release date: June 11, 2006 (San Francisco Black Film Festival)
- Running time: 100 minutes
- Country: United States
- Language: English

Miles from Home is a 2006 drama film written by, directed by and starring Ty Hodges.

== Cast ==
- Ty Hodges as Miles Conway
- Meagan Good as Natasha Freeman
- Stacey Meadows Jr. as Mookie
- Ryan Gill as Peaches
- Tasha Smith as Keisha Knight

== Release ==
The film was released at the San Francisco Black Film Festival on June 11, 2006.

== Reception ==
Dennis Harvey of Variety gave the film a mixed review and wrote, "...the screenplay has some sketchy aspects. But Hodges evinces a sure hand with actors and the tale’s grittier side."

Reece Pendleton of the Chicago Reader also gave it a mixed review calling it "uneven but lively" and wrote, "...it works surprisingly well, enhanced by the excellent performances and the director’s natural flair."
