= Don't Look Under the Bed =

1999 Disney Channel Original Movie

- Promotional advertisement
- Written by: Mark Edward Edens
- Directed by: Kenneth Johnson
- Starring: Erin Chambers; Eric "Ty" Hodges II; Robin Riker; Steve Valentine; Jake Sakson; Stephen Tobolowsky
- Theme music composer: Daniel Licht
- Country of origin: United States
- Original language: English

Production
- Producer: Don Schain
- Cinematography: Richard M. Rawlings
- Editor: David Strohmaier
- Running time: 92 minutes
- Production companies: David Lancaster & Jeff Morton Productions

Original release
- Network: Disney Channel
- Release: October 9, 1999

Don't Look Under the Bed is a 1999 American fantasy horror television film directed by Kenneth Johnson. It was released on October 9, 1999, as a Disney Channel Original Movie (DCOM). The film revolves around children encountering the Boogeyman.

Don't Look Under the Bed was controversial during its production, as Disney was hesitant to include an interracial kiss in the film's climax. The kiss appeared in the final cut of the film. Don't Look Under the Bed garnered numerous complaints from parents, who said it scared their children. For this reason, Disney Channel withdrew it from circulation. Don't Look Under the Bed has received positive retrospective reviews, with critics praising it for being scary.

== Plot ==
Frances Bacon McCausland (Erin Chambers), an intelligent and level-headed girl, is starting high school a year early. Strange things have been going on in her town of Middleberg: dogs appearing on people's roofs, alarm clocks going off hours early, eggs all over a teacher's car, gelatin in the school swimming pool, and the letter "B" spray-painted all over town. The Bs also appear on the school lockers—except for Frances', which has a B on the inside. These pranks seem to point to Frances, who does not understand what is happening or why. An older boy named Larry Houdini (Eric "Ty" Hodges II) offers to help Frances, telling her that he is an imaginary friend, which is proven true as children are the only other people who can see him. Larry tells Frances that she is being framed by the Boogeyman. Frances has a difficult time believing this.

The Boogeyman causes a blackout, foreshadowed by the "Bs" he spray-painted; however, the McCausland home is unaffected, with all its Christmas lights remaining on. Frances then loses her friendship with her best friend Joanne, makes a fool out of herself by trying to convince others that Larry exists, and causes her family to question her sanity. At her wits' end, Frances checks out The Boogey Book from the library for Larry, who decides to build a temptrifuge detailed in the book which will age the Boogeyman into a harmless old geezer. Frances later learns Larry was her brother Darwin's imaginary friend, who still cares about him, but Frances convinced Darwin to grow up and stop believing in him. Larry also cooks up Boogey Goo to use as bait and finds it delicious, which scares Frances. She looks for Boogeyman origins in the book, learning that a Boogeyman is created when the creator of an imaginary friend stops believing too soon.

Having accidentally stepped in Boogey Goo, Darwin attracts the Boogeyman and gets kidnapped while sitting in Frances' room. Frances and Larry follow him to the Boogeyworld dimension, which exists underneath Frances' bed. During the skirmish, Larry turns into a Boogeyman due to Darwin's lack of belief in him, while the other Boogeyman drags Darwin towards a cliff. However, Frances convinces Darwin to believe in Larry again, reverting him to normal. After using the temptrifuge on the Boogeyman, Frances realizes it is her old imaginary friend, Zoe. Frances stopped believing in her when Darwin fell ill, deciding it was time to grow up. Frances proves she still cares about Zoe, holding her hand and causing her to revert to normal. Frances and Darwin return to the real world, where her parents reveal the same antics that occurred in Middleburg are occurring in another city. Larry reveals that "the guy in his head" just ordered him to go take care of the other Boogeyman; Zoe offers to assist as she was rather inexperienced as a Boogeyman and was thus easy to fight.

Frances is distraught as it was not easy for her to believe in them again. Before Larry and Zoe leave, Larry tells Frances it's alright showing her that childhood was great, but so is adulthood if she keeps a sense of wonder. He kisses her, then turns on the Christmas lights outside, allowing him and Zoe to leave. That night, Darwin is scared and is sent to Frances by Larry; she allows him to sleep with her. Larry and Zoe watch this with smiles.

== Cast ==
- Erin Chambers as Frances Bacon McCausland
- Eric "Ty" Hodges II as Larry Houdini, Darwin's imaginary friend
- Robin Riker as Karen McCausland, Frances' mother
- Steve Valentine as Boogeyman
- Jake Sakson as Darwin McCausland, Frances' younger brother
- Stephen Tobolowsky as Michael McCausland, Frances' father
- Mary Parker Williams as Ms. Readle
- Geoff Hansen as Mr. Kepler
- Barry Yourgrau as Principal Gribben
- Nathan Stevens as Albert "Bert" McCausland, Frances and Darwin's older brother
- RuDee Lipscomb as Joanne Smith, Frances' best friend, later former
- Rachel Kimsey as Zoe, the old imaginary friend of Frances

== Production ==
Filming took place in Utah, in 1999. The Boogeyman's world consisted of a set that was custom-built in Salt Lake City, and scenes set at Frances' school were shot at Ogden High School in Ogden, Utah.

The Boogeyman was originally scarier in early concept drawings. According to the film's director, Kenneth Johnson, the character "was really dark and [had] quills sticking out. It was nightmarish. I said, 'Why don't we take him more Victorian and let's have his dialogue be limerick-like and make it a little bit lighter." Eric "Ty" Hodges II, a black actor, portrayed Larry, who was not written as a black character in the script. According to Johnson, Disney was concerned about "having a black boy kiss a white girl" at the film's ending, stating, "They asked me to do it a couple of different ways, including not really at all. I fought for it." Disney ultimately allowed the kiss scene to stay in the film, and Johnson said the scene "is exactly the way I had always intended to do it." In the film's original script, the ending involved Frances and Larry using the tetra-fuse to get rid of the Boogeyman, but Johnson stated that the ending was changed so Frances would defeat the Boogeyman herself. He wanted the climax to resemble Walt Disney's Dumbo (1941), where the title character's heroism comes from within rather than an outside source.

== Release and reception ==
Don't Look Under the Bed premiered on Disney Channel on October 9, 1999. It was the second DCOM to receive a TV-PG rating, due to its scary scenes. According to Johnson, "There were a number of meetings where we'd talked about the tone and what [Disney] wanted it to be — scary but not too scary. That's the bar we kept trying to find. Everybody thought we had hit it until they started getting derogatory mail after it aired." Due to complaints from parents who found the film to be too scary for young children, Disney Channel ceased annual rebroadcasts of it during the month of October after 2006. It is now available for streaming on Disney+.

In 2012, Complex ranked the film at number 19 on the magazine's list of the 25 best DCOMs. In May 2016, Aubrey Page of Collider ranked each DCOM released up to that point, placing Don't Look Under the Bed at number 20 and writing that the film "remains in the DCOM history books for one reason: it's scary as hell." That month, Entertainment Weekly ranked the film at number 27 on a list of the 30 best DCOMs.
