= Friend of Mine (Kelly Price song) =

Single by Kelly Price featuring R. Kelly and Ronald Isley

from the album Soul of a Woman
- Released: May 5, 1998
- Genre: R&B
- Length: 5:29 (album version); 6:17 (remix version)
- Label: T-Neck; Island
- Songwriters: Anthony Dent; Steve Jordan; Kelly Price; Jeffrey Walker; Robert Kelly
- Producers: Anthony Dent; Stevie J.; J-Dub; R. Kelly

Kelly Price singles chronology
"Friend of Mine" (1998)	"Secret Love" (1999)

R. Kelly singles chronology
"Be Careful" (1997)	"Friend of Mine (Remix)" (1998)	"Half on a Baby" (1998)

Ronald Isley singles chronology
"Smokin' Me Out" (1997)	"Friend of Mine (Remix)" (1998)	"Bigger Than Me" (2002)

"Friend of Mine" is a song recorded by singer Kelly Price. It spent five weeks at number 1 on the U.S. R&B chart and was awarded a Soul Train Music Award for Best R&B/Soul or Rap New Artist.

In the song, Price details how her lover was stolen by her best friend.

The song became a pop hit in 1998, peaking at number 12 on the U.S. Pop chart. A remix was made of the song featuring R. Kelly and Ronald Isley.

== Remix Music video ==
The music video for the remix is directed by Hype Williams.

The video opens with Biggs (Ronald Isley) returning to his goddaughter Kelly. In tears, Kelly says she just discovered that her best friend had been sleeping with her husband (R. Kelly). Outraged to hear this, Biggs tells Kelly to call up her ex so he can talk to him. Kelly reluctantly does so and the song ends with Biggs scolding her ex for what he did while Kelly says she doesn't want him anymore.

== Charts and certifications ==
=== Weekly charts ===
Chart (1998)	Peak position
Netherlands (Dutch Top 40)	19
Netherlands (Single Top 100)	26
New Zealand (Recorded Music NZ)	24
Scottish Singles Sales (Official Charts)	86
UK Singles (Official Charts)	25
UK Hip Hop/R&B (Official Charts)	5
US Billboard Hot 100	12
US Hot R&B/Hip-Hop Songs (Billboard)	1
US Rhythmic Airplay (Billboard)	33

=== Year-end charts ===
Chart (1998)	Peak position
US Billboard Hot 100	72
U.S. Hot R&B/Hip Hop Songs (Billboard)	10

=== Certifications ===
Region	Certification	Certified units/sales
United States (RIAA)	Gold	600,000

== See also ==
- List of number-one R&B singles of 1998 (U.S.)
