= Death Saved My Life =

2021 American thriller television film

- Screenplay by: Barbara Kymlicka
- Directed by: Seth Jarrett
- Starring: Meagan Good; Chiké Okonkwo; La'Myia Good
- Music by: Denise Santos
- Country of origin: United States
- Original language: English

Production
- Producer: Garrett Bates
- Cinematography: Hans Charles
- Editor: Dana Congdon
- Running time: 90 minutes
- Production companies: Jarrett Creative Group; Red Hippo Productions

Original release
- Network: Lifetime
- Release: February 13, 2021

Death Saved My Life is a 2021 American thriller television film directed by Seth Jarrett with a screenplay written by Barbara Kymlicka and starring Meagan Good, Chiké Okonkwo, and La'Myia Good. A part of Lifetime's "Ripped from the Headlines" feature film series, it tells the story of a successful marketer who fakes her own death after her controlling, abusive husband hires a hitman to kill her when she decides to leave him. It is inspired by the story of Noela Rukundo, who survived after her husband paid for hitmen to kill her and confronted him at her own funeral.

After being filmed primarily in Haddonfield, New Jersey and other locations throughout New Jersey, Death Saved My Life premiered on the Lifetime network on February 13, 2021.

== Plot ==
Jade and Ed are a married couple who, to their friends and family, seem to have it all. Jade works at a marketing firm, while Ed works as a heart surgeon. However, in private, Ed is emotionally and physically abusive towards Jade. Ed tears up a dress that Jade bought to wear to accept an award at her job, and hits, chokes, and throws her across their bedroom while accusing her of cheating on him with her coworker, Liam. Ed demands that Jade quit her job if she cannot work from home, but Jade instead packs her belongings the following day and sneaks out of the house with Kayla - their daughter - to move in with Leigh, Jade’s sister.

Ed assaults Jade after seeing divorce papers in her car. After Jade leaves work one day, a man in a trench coat walks up to her and aims a pistol at her, but walks away after almost being noticed by Liam. At Leigh's house, Jade reveals to Leigh that Ed has been abusing her and that she thinks Ed is trying to have her killed, but that she cannot report it to the police because Ed would paint her as crazy and would have Shawn to protect him. When Leigh and Kayla leave the house to go the park the next day, a hitman arrives to kill Jade. Ed, having ordered the hit on Jade, arrives at Leigh's house, only to find Jade missing and the kitchen trashed and covered in bloodstains. Meanwhile, Jade rents a room at a motel. A flashback shows that, before the hitman arrived, Jade cut open her own hands and flung herself around the kitchen to make it look like there was a struggle, and that the hitman showed up after Jade had already left.

Jade takes several measures to psychologically torment Ed, including sending him their wedding video from an unknown number, making an anniversary dinner reservation at Ed's favorite restaurant (where she leaves a bouquet of white flowers), replacing the slides in a slideshow he made for work with pictures of a skull superimposed over Jade's face, and sneaking into his house to leave her torn up dress on his bed and fill his closet with her clothes. Jade follows the hitman back to his apartment, where she sneaks in and learns that he is a parolee named Donald. Donald is confronted by Ed at his apartment over Jade still being alive before he notices Jade hiding outside. He runs after her only to be stopped by his parole officers.

Ed develops a drinking problem and starts to show signs of slipping, like choking his new girlfriend, Diane, after confusing her for Jade, forgetting to pick Kayla up from her babysitter, and being too shaky to perform surgery, which causes him to take a leave of absence from his job. Meanwhile, Leigh receives a letter from Jade, letting her know that she is still alive and safe. Jade continues to torment Ed by faking photos of her own dead body and sending them to the police, playing "their song" over Ed's Bluetooth speaker, and filling Ed's kitchen with white flowers.

After a candlelit vigil for Jade, where Ed almost catches Jade in the crowd during Leigh's speech, Leigh drives to Jade's motel room, but is unknowingly followed by Ed. He walks into the room to confront Jade and attempts to choke her, but is stopped by Shawn, who holds him at gunpoint. Ed is arrested and Jade returns home to Leigh and Kayla.

== Cast ==
- Meagan Good as Jade Thompson
- Chiké Okonkwo as Ed Thompson
- La'Myia Good as Leigh
- Sa'Raya Paris Johnson as Kayla
- Darren Goldstein as Officer Shawn Daley
- Robert Eli as Donald Eastwood
- Philip Hernandez as Detective Williams
- Glenn Morizio as Liam
- Joseph Midyett as Detective Bryant
- Azia Celestino as Stephanie Aquino
- Linedy Genao as Kelly
- Shina Ann Morris as Diane
- Sami Ma as Intern
- Thom Sesma as Peter
- Laurie Wells as Ellen
- Jessie Ruane as Host
- Alexis Suarez as Parole Officer
- Ian Blackman as Rob
- Nayab Hussain as Nurse
- Qurrat Ann Kadwani as Reporter

== Production and release ==
In November 2020, Death Saved My Life was announced as part of Lifetime's "Ripped from the Headlines" series. It was also announced that the film would star Meagan Good, Chiké Okonkwo, and La'Myia Good, and would be directed by Seth Jarrett, with a screenplay written by Barbara Kymlicka. Meagan Good said that she chose to star in the film because, as someone who had been in an abusive relationship where she was unable to speak up about it, she wanted to be a part of a project that could "shift the way that someone sees these survivors" and "invoke compassion and can inspire other women". According to Bustle, Death Saved My Life was likely based on the story of Noela Rukundo, a Burundian-Australian woman whose husband hired a hitman to kill her.

Months before filming began, executive producer Julie Insogna Jarrett contacted Steven Gorelick, the executive director of the New Jersey Motion Picture and Television Commission, looking for a "picture-perfect" town to film in, originally planning to film in North Jersey. Gorelick instead pointed her towards Haddonfield, New Jersey, and after Haddonfield Mayor Neal Rochford agreed to let the crew film in Haddonfield, principal photography began and ended in November 2020. It took place at various locations throughout Haddonfield, such as the Haddonfield Borough Municipal Building, King's Court, and Zaffron Mediterranean Cuisine. Additional filming took place throughout New Jersey, including in Knight Park in Collingswood, at the Aloft Hotel in Mount Laurel, and in Oaklyn, Paterson, and Ramsey. Filming ended in December 2020. Due to the movie being filmed during the COVID-19 pandemic, the cast was tested for COVID-19 every 72 hours during filming. Executive producers Julie Insogna Jarrett and Seth Jarrett paid for a hotel in Philadelphia for the cast to stay in during production, where they were instructed to practice "purposeful isolation". Meagan Good revealed that she and her sister cried after shooting a scene in which Jade reveals to Leigh that her husband is abusing her.

Death Saved My Life premiered on the Lifetime network at 8 p.m. on February 13, 2021. The airing of Death Saved My Life was followed by Beyond the Headlines: Faking Death, a short documentary based on Death Saved My Life in which writer Elizabeth Greenwood explains why women fake their deaths. After its premiere, Death Saved My Life became available to stream on Hulu, Philo, FuboTV, and on the Lifetime website.

== Critical reception ==
Jennifer Green of Common Sense Media gave Death Saved My Life three out of five stars, calling it "well-acted" and highlighting the performances of the Good sisters as "convincing" and Okonkwo's performance as "charming", but writing that certain scenarios in the film were "slightly far-fetched" and criticizing the "unnecessary" time jumps and "stilted" dialogue at the beginning of the film.
