= La'Myia Good =

American singer and actress

- Also known as: Myla
- Born: La'Myia Janae Good; September 27, 1979 (age 47); Los Angeles, California, U.S.
- Origin: Los Angeles, California, U.S.
- Genres: R&B; soul
- Occupations: Singer; actress
- Years active: 1993–present
- Label: Arista
- Spouse: Eric Bellinger (m. 2015)

La'Myia Janae Good-Bellinger (born September 27, 1979) is an American singer and actress. Good is best known for her voice work in the blockbuster PlayStation 3 game Killzone 3 as the voice of Jammer and her work with R&B group Isyss. Good has appeared in numerous television shows such as Tall Hopes, Sister, Sister, The Parent 'Hood, Smart Guy, ER, The Parkers and Judging Amy. She has also appeared in films such as The Wood.

== Early life ==
Good was born in Panorama City, California to Tyra Wardlow-Doyle (who worked as her sister's manager into her teens), and Leon Good, an LAPD police officer. Good is the older sister of actress Meagan Good and older cousin of actor and singer Dijon Talton.

== Career ==
=== Isyss and BAD GYRL ===
In 2001, Good along with LeTecia Harrison, Ardena Clark, and lead singer Quierra Davis-Martin formed the R&B group known as Isyss. As a group, they achieved moderate success in 2002 with their debut album, "The Way We Do", which included the Hot 100 charting singles "Day & Night" featuring rapper Jadakiss and their signature song "Single For The Rest Of My Life". During their career, they performed the theme song to the short lived BET talk show "Oh Drama" and were the spokespersons for "Got 2 B So Smooth" hair care products. They were nominated for two Soul Train Lady of Soul Awards and took home one award. Due to poor album sales, they were later dropped from Arista Records, before they could release a second album. Ardena Clark was later replaced by a new member "Love" shortly before they broke up, due to creative differences. Their only album "The Way We Do" reached # 55 on the Billboard Charts and has sold about 300,000 copies. After leaving the group in 2006, Good and "Love" both became members of the R&B trio known as BAD GYRL, which also eventually disbanded. Following her time with both groups, Good decided to focus on acting.

== Personal life ==
Good married singer Eric Bellinger in January 2015. The couple has two sons: Elysha Bellinger and Eazy Bellinger.

She is the older sister of actress Megan Good.

== Discography ==
- The Way We Do (2002)

== Filmography ==
=== Film ===
Year	Title	Role	Notes
1999	The Wood	Monica	
2009	Busted	Nay-Nay	
2011	Video Girl	Stacey Walker	
2012	Dick Little	Bullet	
2013	Act Like You Love Me	Larissa	
2014	Crossed the Line	Lynn	
2015	Charlie, Trevor, and a Girl Savannah	-	
2019	The Waiting Room	Kendall	
2019	If Not Now, When?	Erica	
2021	Death Saved My Life	Leigh	TV movie
2023	Vicious Affair	Camilla	TV movie

=== Television ===
Year	Title	Role	Notes
1993	Tall Hopes	Leticia	Episode: "Pilot"
1995	Sister, Sister	Girl	Episode: "The Tutor"
1997	The Parent 'Hood	Nakia	Episode: "No Soul on Ice"
1997	City Guys	Briana	Episode: "The Date" & "Red Ferrari"
1998	Smart Guy	Tina	Episode: "Stop the Presses"
1999	ER	Sharice Haines	Episode: "Rites of Spring"
2000	The Parkers	Aysia	Episode: "Cheers"
2001	Popular	Girl #2	Episode: "Fag"
2001	City Guys	Leeza	Episode: "Dances with Malcolm"
2001	Judging Amy	Rochandra Travino	Episode: "Beating the Bounds"
2017	Family Time	-	Episode: "Love Tat"
2019	BET Her Presents: The Waiting Room	Kendall	Episode: "The Waiting Room"
2022	Kingdom Business	Essence	Recurring Cast: Season 1
2026	Reasonable Doubt	Tatiana	Episode: Imaginary Players

=== Video games ===
Year	Title	Role	Notes
2011	Killzone 3	Jammer	Voice
