= The Way We Do =

Studio album by Isyss
- Released: September 24, 2002
- Recorded: September 5, 2001–June 25, 2002
- Studios: The Enterprise (Burbank, CA); Diginote Studios (Miami Beach, FL); Music House Studios (Atlanta, GA); Mastersound Studio (Virginia Beach, VA); 353 Studio (New York, NY); Chase Studios (Atlanta, GA)
- Genres: R&B; hip hop soul
- Length: 58:35
- Label: Arista
- Producers: Anthony Dent; Billy Moss; Chris Jennings; Christopher "Deep" Henderson; Doug Rasheed; Dr. Ceuss; Eric Johnson; Jovonn Alexander; She'kspere; Tyrice Jones

Singles from The Way We Do
- 1. "Day & Night" Released: July 9, 2002; 2. "Single for the Rest of My Life" Released: September 10, 2002

Professional ratings
Review scores
Source	Rating
AllMusic	2/5 stars
USA Today	2.5/4 stars
Vibe	2.5/5 stars

The Way We Do is the only studio album by American contemporary R&B quartet Isyss. It was released on September 24, 2002, via Arista Records. Recording sessions took place at The Enterprise in Burbank, Diginote Music in Miami Beach, Music House and Chase Studios in Atlanta, Mastersound Recording Studios in Virginia Beach, and Studio 353 in New York. Production was handled by Billy Moss, She'kspere, Tyrice Jones, Anthony Dent, Chris Jennings, Christopher "Deep" Henderson, Doug Rasheed, Dr. Ceuss, Eric Johnson and Jovonn Alexander.

In the United States, the album debuted at number 55 on the Billboard 200 and number 12 on the Top R&B/Hip-Hop Albums charts. It was supported with two singles: "Day & Night" and "Single for the Rest of My Life", which made it to the Billboard Hot 100, reaching No. 98 and 71, respectively.

== Track listing ==
No.	Title	Writer(s)	Producer(s)	Length
1.	"Intro"	Billy Moss	Billy Moss; Doug Rasheed	0:42
2.	"That's the Way We Do" (Part I)	Tyrice Jones	Tyrice Jones	3:17
3.	"Day & Night" (Remix) (featuring Jadakiss)	Brande Kelley; Jones	Tyrice Jones; She'kspere^{[r]}	3:51
4.	"Holla at Me"	Kevin Briggs; Patrice Stewart	She'kspere; Buttaphly^{[v]}	4:26
5.	"Oh No She Didn't"	Christopher Henderson; Corey Purnell	Christopher "Deep" Henderson; Corey P.O.W.^{[c]}	4:11
6.	"No Na Na"	Quierra Davis-Martin; Kelly Jamison; Victor White; Moss	Billy Moss	3:46
7.	"Stood Up"	Briggs; Stewart	She'kspere; Buttaphly^{[v]}	3:31
8.	"Hater"	Kandice Love; Chad Elliott; Bernie Stevenson	Dr. Ceuss; Jovonn Alexander; Bernie Stevenson^{[a]}	3:18
9.	"Single for the Rest of My Life"	Jason Boyd; Kandi Burruss; Anthony Dent	Dent; David Guerro^{[v]}	3:56
10.	"Uh Uh, Uh Uh"	Moss	Billy Moss	4:01
11.	"Not Letting Him Go"	Briggs; Stewart	She'kspere; Buttaphly^{[v]}	3:39
12.	"Beautiful U"	Davis-Martin; David Young; Moss	Billy Moss	3:51
13.	"Message 2 U"	James Glasco; Trisha Covington; Christopher Jennings; Eric Johnson	Chris Jennings; Eric Johnson; Billy Moss^{[v]}	4:07
14.	"That's the Way We Do" (Part II)	Sparkle Lanton; Jones; Awood Johnson Jr.; Calvin Broadus; Corey Miller; Craig Lawson	Tyrice Jones	3:33
15.	"Unladylike"	Davis-Martin; Ardena Clark; La'Myia Good; LeTecia Harrison; Young; Moss	Billy Moss	3:30
16.	"Thank You Lord (Outro)"	Davis-Martin; Moss	Billy Moss	1:26
17.	"Day & Night" (Original Version) (featuring Jadakiss) (bonus track)	Kelley; Jones	Tyrice Jones	3:30
Total length:				58:35

Japanese bonus track
No.	Title	Music	Length
18.	"Day & Night" (Gota & Jimmy Gomez Vocal Mix)	Tyrice Jones, Brande Kelly	3:22

Notes

- ^{^[a]} signifies an additional producer.
- ^{^[c]} signifies a co-producer.
- ^{^[r]} signifies a remix producer.
- ^{^[v]} signifies a vocal producer.

Sample credits

- Track 14 contains replayed elements from "Down for My N's".

== Personnel ==
- Quierra Davis-Martin — vocals, vocal arranger (track 15)
- Ardena Clark — vocals
- La'Myia Good — vocals
- LeTecia Harrison — vocals
- Jason "Jadakiss" Phillips — rap vocals (tracks: 3, 17)
- Charles Fearing — guitar (track 6)
- Delbert Jones — acoustic guitar (track 17)
- Billy Moss — producer (tracks: 1, 6, 10, 12, 15, 16), programming (tracks: 6, 10, 15, 16), vocal producer (track 13), executive producer, A&R
- Doug Rasheed — producer (track 1)
- Tyrice Jones — producer & recording (tracks: 2, 3, 14, 17), programming (tracks: 2, 14, 17)
- Kevin "She'kspere" Briggs — MIDI controller (tracks: 3, 4, 7, 11), producer & arranger (tracks: 4, 7, 11), remix producer (track 3)
- Patrice "Buttaphly" Stewart — vocal producer (tracks: 4, 7, 11)
- Christopher "Deep" Henderson — producer (track 5)
- Corey Purnell — co-producer (track 5)
- Chad "Dr. Ceuss" Elliott — producer (track 8)
- Jovonn Alexander — producer (track 8)
- Bernie Stevenson — additional producer (track 8)
- Anthony Dent — producer & recording (track 9)
- David Guerro — vocal producer (track 9)
- Christopher Jennings — producer & programming (track 13)
- Eric Johnson — producer (track 13)
- William Lockwood — programming (track 13)
- Chauncey Mahan — additional Pro Tools engineering (track 13)
- Victor White — programming (track 16)
- Brian Springer — recording (tracks: 1–3, 5, 6, 9, 10, 12–17)
- Cornell Wiley — recording (track 3)
- Ben Briggs III — recording (tracks: 4, 7, 11)
- Robert Ulsh — recording (track 5)
- Andre Debourg — recording (track 8)
- Brian Douglas — recording assistant (tracks: 1, 6, 10, 12, 13, 15, 16)
- Chris Dela Pena — recording assistant (track 5)
- Kevin Davis — mixing
- Steve Baughman — mixing assistant (tracks: 1, 6, 10, 12, 13, 15, 16), engineering assistant (tracks: 2, 3, 14, 17)
- Herb Powers Jr. — mastering
- Antonio Reid — executive producer
- Gerry Griffith — associate executive producer
- John Hecker — associate executive producer
- Mike Ruiz — photography
- Joey Arbagey — A&R
- Shawndella B. Taylor — A&R assistant
- Katrina Wright — coordinator
- Erica Grayson — management
- Qadree El-Amin — management
- Phillana Williams — marketing
- Eric Custer — legal
- Rachel Johnson — stylist

== Charts ==
Chart (2002)	Peak position
US Billboard 200	55
US Top R&B/Hip-Hop Albums (Billboard)	12
