= A Girl Like Grace =

2015 film by Ty Hodges

- Directed by: Ty Hodges
- Written by: Ty Hodges; Jacquin Deleon
- Produced by: Meagan Good; Matt Keith; Ty Hodges; Datari Turner; Carnetta Jones
- Starring: Ryan Destiny; Meagan Good; Raven-Symoné; Garcelle Beauvais; Romeo Miller; Paige Hurd
- Cinematography: Teddy Smith
- Edited by: Kelly McCoy
- Music by: Maxwell Sterling
- Production companies: Datari Turner Prods; Leverage Films; Azro Media; God’s Gang Entertainment
- Release date: June 18, 2015 (LA Film Festival)
- Running time: 94 minutes
- Country: United States
- Language: English

A Girl Like Grace is a 2015 coming of age drama film directed by Ty Hodges. It stars Ryan Destiny, Meagan Good, Raven-Symoné, Garcelle Beauvais, Romeo Miller and Paige Hurd.

== Plot ==
Grace, a Haitian-American girl, deals with issues like bullying at her school and a friend's suicide.

== Cast ==
- Ryan Destiny as Grace
- Meagan Good as Share
- Garcelle Beauvais as Lisa
- Raven-Symoné as Mary
- Paige Hurd as Andrea
- Romeo Miller as Jason
- Ty Hodges as Matt
- Blair Redford as Billy

== Release ==
The film was released on June 18, 2015 at the LA Film Festival.

== Reception ==
Sandie Angulo Chen of Common Sense Media awarded the film two stars out of five and wrote, "Gritty, uneven coming-of-age drama has drugs, sex, violence."

Geoff Berkshire of Variety gave the film a negative review and wrote that it "comes on strong but lacks the experience or perspective to fully convince."
