= Hard to Hit =

Studio album by Big Mike
- Released: May 25, 1999
- Recorded: 1998–1999
- Studio: Hippie House Studio (Houston, TX)
- Genres: Southern hip hop; gangsta rap
- Length: 1:07:42
- Labels: Rap-A-Lot Records; Priority Records; EMI Records
- Producers: J. Prince (exec.); Mike B.; Mike Dean; Mr. Lee; Sinister Sam

Big Mike chronology
Still Serious (1997)	Hard to Hit (1999)	Nawlins Phats (2005)

Professional ratings
Review scores
Source	Rating
AllMusic	2.5/5 stars
The Source	4/5 stars

Hard to Hit is the third solo studio album by American rapper Big Mike. It was released on May 25, 1999 via Rap-A-Lot Records, making it his final album on the label. It was produced by Mike B, Mike Dean, Mr. Lee and Sinister Sam. The album peaked at #63 on the Billboard 200 and #13 on the Top R&B/Hip-Hop Albums chart.

== Track listing ==
No.	Title	Producer(s)	Length
1.	"Return of the Gangsta Shit"	Mike Dean	2:12
2.	"Made Men"	Mike B	3:09
3.	"Hard to Hit"	Mike Dean	3:30
4.	"12 O'Clock" (featuring The Hustlers)	Mike B; Mike Dean	4:19
5.	"Hustlers"	Mike B	3:04
6.	"Southern Supreme" (featuring Grudge & Tremendous)	Mike Dean	2:56
7.	"Sunday Morning"	Mike Dean; Mr. Lee	4:04
8.	"Heads Like Us"	Mike B	4:43
9.	"Better Now" (featuring Devin the Dude & MC Breed)	Mike Dean; Mr. Lee	4:03
10.	"Claimin' Real"	Mike B	2:46
11.	"Uhh! Uhh!" (featuring O.C. of the Hoodlumz & N.A.R.D. of Do Or Die)	Mr. Lee	4:03
12.	"Giddy Up" (featuring Grudge)	Mr. Lee	3:35
13.	"This Goes Out"	Mr. Lee	3:24
14.	"1000 Guns"	Mike B; Sinister Sam	3:19
15.	"How You Want It" (featuring Outlawz & Grudge)	Mr. Lee	3:54
16.	"One Time"	Mr. Lee	2:53
17.	"All My Love"	Mike B	3:52
18.	"Twirk It" (featuring Jayo Felony & Spice 1)	Mike Dean; Mr. Lee	3:22
19.	"None" (featuring Yukmouth & Tremendous)	Mike B	3:51
20.	"Suckers 2 Me"	Mr. Lee	3:52
Total length:			1:07:42

== Charts ==
Chart (1999)	Peak position
US Billboard 200	63
US Top R&B/Hip-Hop Albums (Billboard)	13
