= Single for the Rest of My Life =

2002 single by Isyss

Single by Isyss

from the album The Way We Do
- Released: September 10, 2002
- Length: 3:55
- Label: Arista
- Songwriters: Jason Boyd, Kandi Burruss, Anthony Dent
- Producer: Dent

Isyss singles chronology
"Day & Night" (2002)	"Single for the Rest of My Life" (2002)

Music video
- "Single for the Rest of My Life" on YouTube

"Single for the Rest of My Life" is a song by American R&B group Isyss, released on September 10, 2002, as the second single from their debut studio album The Way We Do (2002).

== Composition and critical reception ==
Dan LeRoy wrote a positive response to the song, describing it as a "nice amalgam of acoustic soul and stuttering beats."

== Charts ==
Chart (2002)	Peak position
US Billboard Hot 100	71
US Hot R&B/Hip-Hop Songs (Billboard)	62
