= Charlie, Trevor and a Girl Savannah =

- Film poster
- Directed by: Ty Hodges
- Written by: Ty Hodges
- Produced by: Ty Hodges; Matteo Tabib; Sasan Tabib
- Starring: Ty Hodges
- Cinematography: Austin Schmidt
- Edited by: Kelly McCoy
- Production company: Sky 1 Productions
- Release date: June 19, 2015 (Los Angeles)
- Running time: 95 minutes
- Country: United States
- Language: English

Charlie, Trevor and a Girl Savannah is a 2015 American crime thriller film written and directed by and starring Ty Hodges.

== Cast ==
- Ty Hodges as Charlie
- Eric Roberts as Dr. McMillan
- Toby Hemingway as Trevor
- Emily Meade as Savannah
- Brendan Dooling as "June Bug"

== Release ==
The film premiered at Arena Cinema in Los Angeles on June 19, 2015.
