= Paige Hurd =

American actress

Paige Hurd-O'Neale
- Occupations: Actress; model
- Years active: 2000–present
- Known for: Everybody Hates Chris; Power Book II: Ghost; The Oval
- Spouse: Royce O'Neale (m. 2026)

Paige Hurd is an American actress best known for her recurring role as Tasha Clarkson on the CW sitcom Everybody Hates Chris. She has also played Samantha Grover in Hawaii Five-0 (2013–2017), Gayle Franklin in The Oval (2019–2023), and Lauren Baldwin in Power Book II: Ghost (2020–2023).

== Early life ==
The late rapper DMX was Hurd's godfather.

== Career ==
Hurd portrayed Tasha, next-door neighbor of Chris (Tyler James Williams), in the Chris Rock-produced TV show Everybody Hates Chris. Hurd played DMX's daughter in Cradle 2 the Grave, a 2003 film starring Jet Li. Paige appeared as Denise in The Cat in the Hat, a 2003 family-comedy film loosely based on the 1957 book of the same name, by Dr. Seuss.

Hurd was featured in the 2005 comedy Beauty Shop, which starred Queen Latifah.

Hurd appeared in Jasmine Villegas's music video for "I Own This" and Steph Jones's music video for "Beautiful." She was Justin Bieber's love interest in the music video of "Never Let You Go." She was featured in Romeo Miller's music video "Mistletoe". Hurd started her acting career training with Dallas Young Actors Studio, directed by Linda Seto. She is starring in a new movie called "Crosstown" with well-known actors and actresses such as Vivica A. Fox. She was also featured in two of singer Trevante's music videos "Be Your First" and "Forever." In 2014, Paige starred in G-Eazy's music video for the single "I Mean It." And in 2012, she participated in the music video of Nas titled "Daughters".

In 2019, she began starring as one of the lead roles in the hit show Tyler Perry's The Oval, where she played as the first daughter "Gayle Franklin", who is rebellious and a wild child she left during season 2. From 2020 to 2023, she starred as Lauren Baldwin in Power Book II: Ghost, which serves as a sequel and spin off to the original series Power.

== Personal life ==
Since 2024, Hurd has been in a relationship with Royce O'Neale and they got engaged on February 13, 2025 at Viceroy Riviera Maya in Cabo San Lucas, Mexico. On July 18, 2026, Hurd and O'Neale got married at the Oheka Castle in Huntington, New York.

== Filmography ==
Film
Year	Title	Role	Notes
2003	Cradle 2 the Grave	Vanessa	
2003	The Cat in the Hat	Denise	
2004	Time Out	Lauren Martin	
2004	Never Die Alone	Young Ella	
2005	Virginia	Ginny	
2005	The Adventures of Tango McNorton: Licensed Hero	Sudserella	
2005	Beauty Shop	Vanessa	
2007	Ben 10: Race Against Time	Stephanie	TV movie
2008	Pick or Press	Unknown	Video short
2009	Surviving Brotherhood	Ashley	Video short
2010	Peep Game	Tresse Hart	
2013	Greencard Warriors	Jazmine	
2015	A Girl Like Grace	Andrea	
2016	Grandma’s House	Maryland	
2018	Thriller	Gina Brown	
2025	The Girl in the Garage: The Laura Cowan Story	Laura Cowan	TV movie

Television
Year	Title	Role	Notes
2000	Felicity	Natasha	Episode: "True Colors"
2002	Boomtown	Grace Adams	Episode: "Pilot"
2002	George Lopez	Little Girl	Episode: "Halloween Cheer"
2003	The Division	Chloe	Episode: "Extreme Action Figures"
2005	The Suite Life of Zack & Cody	Tiffany	Episode: "The Fairest of Them All"
2005	Medium	Ashley	Episode: "The Reckoning"
2006	ER	Danielle Davis	Episode: "Tell Me No Secrets"
2006–2009	Everybody Hates Chris	Tasha	Recurring role
2007–2011	City 17	Vanessa	Recurring role
2013–2017	Hawaii Five-0	Samantha Grover	Recurring role
2019–2023	Tyler Perry's The Oval	First Daughter Gayle Franklin	Main role
2020–2023	Power Book II: Ghost	Lauren Baldwin	Main role
2022	Mr Snuggles	Vanessa	Guest role
