= Soul of a Woman (Kelly Price album) =

Studio album by Kelly Price
- Released: August 11, 1998
- Genre: R&B
- Length: 57:07
- Labels: T-Neck; Island
- Producers: Carlos & Dada; Anthony Dent; Stevie J.; J-Dub; Daron Jones; R. Kelly; Herb Middleton; Kelly Price; Al West; Hiriam Hicks (exec.); Ronald Isley (exec.)

Kelly Price chronology
Soul of a Woman (1998)	Mirror Mirror (2000)

Singles from Soul of a Woman
- 1. "Friend of Mine" Released: May 5, 1998; 2. "Secret Love" Released: April 1999; 3. "Soul of a Woman" Released: August 1999

Soul of a Woman is the debut studio album by American singer Kelly Price. It was released by T-Neck Records and Island Records on August 11, 1998, in the United States. Originally a backing vocalist, Price rejected offers from Mariah Carey's Crave Records and Sean "Puffy" Combs' Bad Boy Records, before signing with the Isley Brothers' T-Neck label. While she co-wrote and produced most of the material on Soul of a Woman, Prince also worked with Anthony Dent and Jermaine Dupri, among others.

The album earned generally positive reviews from music critics. It debuted and peaked at number 15 on the US Billboard 200 and reached number two on the Top R&B/Hip-Hop Albums chart, eventually reaching Platinum status in the United States. Soul of a Woman's most popular song was lead single "Friend of Mine," which became a number-one hit on the US Hot R&B/Hip-Hop Songs and became a top five hit on the UK R&B Singles chart. The album would remain her only release with T-Neck.

== Background ==
Price launched her musical career when she and her sister Shanrae landed a gig touring as background singers for singer Mariah Carey. While Shanrae later left the industry, Price initially declined a recording deal with Carey's Crave Records and sidelined her solo ambitions to focus on working behind the scenes, writing, arranging and singing background for various artists. After a chance studio encounter with Sean "Puffy" Combs, he recruited her for his writing and producing arsenal The Hitmen, with whom the singer co-wrote hits for several Bad Boy artists. Combs soon offered her a deal with his Bad Boy label, but Price feared that, in return, he would demand her to change her appearance, especially to lose weight.

In May 1997, she finally secured a record deal through the Isley Brothers, whom she met while working on a remix of their single "Floatin' on Your Love" (1996). Price eventually signed with the band's T-Neck Records label, then distributed by Island Records, and began work on her debut album with label, consulting work from several musicians, including Carlos & Dada, Anthony Dent, Jermaine Dupri, Daron Jones, R. Kelly, Herb Middleton, and Al West, 112 band members Daron Jones and Quinnes "Q" Parker as well as The Hitmen associates Stevie J. and J-Dub. Price would co-write on all eleven original songs on the album and produce or co-producer on seven tracks on Soul of a Woman.

== Critical reception ==
Professional ratings
Review scores
Source	Rating
AllMusic	4/5 stars
Robert Christgau	(dud)
Entertainment Weekly	B
Los Angeles Times	3.5/4 stars

In his review for Billboard, critic Paul Verna noted that with Soul of a Woman "Price has done an outstanding job on a project that has the potential to be extremely radio-friendly." AllMusic editor Stephen Thomas Erlewine called Price an "urban crooner, much like a streetwise Mariah Carey or a domesticated Mary J. Blige. She has a sweet, smooth voice that's a joy to listen to, but what makes her debut Soul of a Woman so impressive is that she's not just a singer, she's a talented songwriter as well. Soul of a Woman is filled with well-crafted contemporary R&B songs that are melodic, memorable and perfectly delivered. It's an audacious debut from a promising young talent." New York Times wrote that "Price wields her sumptuous voice with gospel fervor and flamboyance in new songs -- most of them languorous ballads – about loving, cheating and holding on to faith."

Connie Johnson, writing for the Los Angeles Times, called the album "a stirring debut" and compared Price to "Jennifer Holliday, Shirley Murdock and Martha Wash. All once showed brilliant promise, but none managed to sustain a thriving recording career. Connections with heavy-hitters such as Puff Daddy, R. Kelly and Ronald Isley, all of whom provided production touches to this debut album, may help Price avoid a similar fate." Craig Seymour from The Washington Post found that Soul of a Woman "exemplifies R&B at its cathartic best," while Lynn Norment from Ebony wrote that "the soul of rhythm of blues is blessed to have this dynamic, urgent voice that evokes and translates the passions of today's Black woman." Tiarra Mukherjee from Entertainment Weekly found that "one listen to her debut makes clear that Price's poignant vocals rise above her peers'. But without the sugar-pop hooks and samples that dominate the charts, Soul will move only the adult crowd, until the remixers come calling."

== Chart performance ==
Soul of a Woman debuted and peaked at number 15 on the US Billboard 200 and number two on the US Top R&B/Hip-Hop Albums chart in the week of August 29, 1998. The album was certified Gold by the Recording Industry Association of America (RIAA) on September 16, 1998 and, with shipments figures in excess of 1.0 million units, reached Platinum status on April 27, 1999. By September 2003, it had sold 1.3 million copies domestically.

== Track listing ==
Sourced from

No.	Title	Writer(s)	Producer(s)	Length
1.	"Don't Go Away (Interlude)"	Kelly Price	Price; Alvin West	1:16
2.	"Friend of Mine"	Price; Anthony Dent; Steve Jordan; Jeffrey Walker	Dent; J-Dub; Stevie J	5:29
3.	"Secret Love"	Price; Daron Jones; Quinnes Parker; Marvin Scandrick; Michael Keith; Courtney Sills	Jones	4:20
4.	"Don't Say Goodbye"	Price; Joseph E. Kelley; West; Joe Wyman Rogers	Price; West	4:28
5.	"Kiss Test"	Price; Alvin West	West; Price; Peter Mokran^{[b]}	4:06
6.	"Soul of a Woman"	Price; Carlos Valdez Thornton; Benny Tillman; Dwayne Wiggins; Carl Wheeler	Carlos & Dada	4:32
7.	"You Complete Me" (featuring Daron Jones and Quinnes "Q" Parker)	Price; Parker; Jones; Scandrick; Keith; Sills	Jones	4:23
8.	"Soul of a Woman (Interlude)"	Price	Price	3:18
9.	"Her"	Price; Herb Middleton; Etterlene Jordan	Middleton	4:49
10.	"Your Love"	Price; James Lloyd	Price; Shawn Smith^{[a]}	4:04
11.	"Take Me to a Dream"	Price	Price	4:14
12.	"Lord of All"	Marshall Carpenter	Price	5:51
13.	"Friend of Mine (Remix)" (featuring R. Kelly & Ronald Isley)	Price; Dent; Jordan; Walker; Robert Kelly	Dent; J Dub; Stevie J; R. Kelly^{[b]}	6:17
Total length:				57:07

Notes

- ^{^[a]} denotes co-producer
- ^{^[b]} denotes additional producer

Sample credits

- "Friend of Mine" contains interpolations from the composition "Summer Breeze" as written by Seals and Crofts.
- "Soul of a Woman" contains excerpts from "Whatever You Want" as performed by Tony! Toni! Toné!.

== Charts ==
=== Weekly charts ===
Weekly chart performance for Soul of a Woman
Chart (1998)	Peak position
Dutch Albums (Album Top 100)	80
US Billboard 200	15
US Top R&B/Hip-Hop Albums (Billboard)	2

=== Year-end charts ===
1998 year-end chart performance for Soul of a Woman
Chart (1998)	Position
US Billboard 200	139
US Top R&B/Hip-Hop Albums (Billboard)	29

1999 year-end chart performance for Soul of a Woman
Chart (1999)	Position
US Top R&B/Hip-Hop Albums (Billboard)	58

== Certifications ==
Certifications for Soul of a Woman
Region	Certification	Certified units/sales
United States (RIAA)	Platinum	1,300,000
