= Still Serious =

Studio album by Big Mike
- Released: April 8, 1997
- Recorded: 1996–1997
- Studio: The Enterprise (Burbank, CA)
- Genres: Southern hip hop; gangsta rap
- Length: 53:36
- Labels: Rap-A-Lot Records; Noo Trybe Records; Virgin Records; EMI Records
- Producers: J. Prince (exec.); Mike Dean; Mike B.; Loranzo Samuels; Anthony Dent; Big Mike; N.O. Joe

Big Mike chronology
Somethin' Serious (1994)	Still Serious (1997)	Hard to Hit (1999)

Professional ratings
Review scores
Source	Rating
AllMusic	4/5 stars
RapReviews	8.5/10 stars

Still Serious is the second solo studio album by American rapper Big Mike. It was released on April 8, 1997, via Rap-A-Lot Records. Production of the album was handled by Mike Dean, Mike B., Loranzo Samuels, Anthony Dent and N.O. Joe. This album proved to be the most successful of Big Mike's solo releases, peaking at #16 on the Billboard 200 and #3 on the Top R&B/Hip-Hop Albums.

== Track listing ==
No.	Title	Producer(s)	Length
1.	"Playas to Governors"	Mike B.	2:36
2.	"Seal It w/a Kiss"	Loranzo Samuels	4:02
3.	"Southern Dialect"	Mike Dean	4:40
4.	"Candy's 4 Babies" (featuring Tremendous)	Mike B.; Loranzo Samuels	4:56
5.	"'Burban & Impalas"	Mike B.	4:24
6.	"All a Dream" (featuring Tremendous)	Mike Dean	5:59
7.	"It's Alright" (featuring Tremendous)	Mike B.	4:53
8.	"Grey Skies" (featuring Tremendous)	Mike Dean; Big Mike	4:40
9.	"Everybody Wants a Name"	Anthony Dent	4:24
10.	"Southern Comfort (On & On)" (featuring Mystikal)	Mike Dean	3:57
11.	"Still Serious"	N.O. Joe	4:37
12.	"Black Lacquer"	Mike Dean	4:28
Total length:			53:36

== Charts ==
=== Weekly charts ===
Chart (1997)	Peak position
US Billboard 200	16
US Top R&B/Hip-Hop Albums (Billboard)	3

=== Year-end charts ===
Chart (1997)	Position
US Top R&B/Hip-Hop Albums (Billboard)	77
