= Venus as a Boy (film) =

2021 American romantic drama film directed by Ty Hodges

- Official poster
- Directed by: Ty Hodges
- Written by: Ty Hodges
- Produced by: Ty Hodges; Gian Franco; Roya Rastegar; Sanjay M. Sharma
- Starring: Ty Hodges; Olivia Culpo; Trace Lysette; Bai Ling; Estelle; Gilles Marini; Evan A. Dunn
- Cinematography: Adrian M. Pruett
- Edited by: Samuel Means
- Music by: Tero Golden
- Production companies: Lost Ones; New Hero; Marginal Mediaworks; We The People
- Distributed by: Hulu; Lost Ones
- Release dates: June 14, 2021 (Tribeca); September 24, 2021 (United States)
- Running time: 104 minutes
- Countries: United States; United Kingdom
- Language: English

Venus as a Boy is a 2021 American romantic drama film written, directed, and produced by Ty Hodges. Along with Hodges, it was produced by Gian Franco, Roya Rastegar, and Sanjay M. Sharma. It stars Hodges, Olivia Culpo, Trace Lysette, Bai Ling, Estelle, Gilles Marini, Daniel Bonjour, and Stacy Barthe. Set against the vibrant Los Angeles art scene, the film follows an artist living in Venice Beach, who embarks on a chance romance with a famous influencer.

Principal photography began on August 27, 2019, in Los Angeles, California, and wrapped on October 14, 2019.

The film had its world premiere at 20th Tribeca Film Festival on June 14, 2021. It was released exclusively on Amazon Prime Video on demand on September 24, 2021, by American entertainment company Lost Ones and on Hulu on February 15, 2022, as part of Hulu’s celebration of black stories for Black History Month.

== Cast ==
- Ty Hodges as Hunter
- Olivia Culpo as Ruby
- Trace Lysette as Hendrix
- Bai Ling as Cleo
- Estelle as Alo
- Gilles Marini as Pierre
- Daniel Bonjour as Johnny
- Stacy Barthe as The Black Madonna
- Lola Blanc as Margie
- Johnny Rivas as Francisco
- Cottrell Guidry as Ashley
- Eddie 'Mijo' Rodriguez as Mijo
- DJ Beat as himself
- Shavya Samala as Penelope
- Preston James Hiller as Officer Tanner
- Anthony C. Stafford as Office Lyman

== Production ==
Ty Hodges, Gian Franco, Roya Rastegar, and Sanjay M. Sharma served as producers on the film, with Lost Ones producing and distributing and with Hodges directing from a screenplay he wrote.

Ty Hodges told John Russell of Grazia that casting the role of Ruby in the film took seven months until Hodges and Franco landed on Olivia Culpo, whose “acting chops, as well as her authenticity, that sealed the deal”. Culpo stated, “playing a version of what I do in real life was very cathartic. And challenging too in some respects”.

Hodges told Brent Lang of Variety, “Completing this movie during a pandemic was such an unprecedented experience. It forced us to dig deep as a team and to figure out how to deliver a project that we believe is timely; and, now, do so in a way that reaches as many people as possible.”

=== Filming ===
Principal photography began on August 27, 2019, in Los Angeles, with additional filming taking place in the Mojave Desert and New York City. Filming lasted 23 days.

=== Music ===
The film takes its title from the 1993 Björk single, "Venus as a Boy". The song is featured on the film's official Spotify playlist.

Hodges performing under the pseudonym BRITISH BROOKLYN performed much of the music found in the film. The music was created in conjunction with his brother Tero Golden, who composed the film's original score.

The film features Trace Lysette’s debut rap single “SMB”. Nolan Feeney of Billboard writes, “writer-director Ty Hodges reached out about casting her as an aspiring rapper in his latest movie, Venus as a Boy, and asked if she had thought about recording music, too. Says Lysette: “I was like, ‘Let’s do this! This is what I’ve been manifesting!’”

The film also features music from Stacy Barthe, 3 Black Kids, Stone, and Canadian rhythm and blues singer Noah Kinzo.

== Themes ==
Hodges describes the essence of the film as a story about the journey to self-love. Hodges stated he wished to make a film about "a man we rarely see on screen".

Hodges stated, "When I'm seeing men that look like me on screen, it's dealt, in an arena of pain, oppression, violence." With Venus as a Boy, he hoped to challenge the representation of Black men on screen. In the film, Hunter's character displays vulnerability that is very rarely seen on screen from Black men without it being considered weak.

Courtney Gardner writing for Independent Magazine describes how the film also explores racism, inequality, and privilege, particularly outside "of the constricted box that White culture has defined".

== Release ==
The film made its online world premiere at the 20th Tribeca Festival in June 2021. In September 2021, Lost Ones announced the launch of their distribution arm, with Venus as a Boy as their first release. It was released exclusively on Amazon Prime Video on demand on September 24, 2021, in the United States and United Kingdom. It was later released on Google Play and Vudu in the U.S. and on iTunes and Apple TV worldwide in February 2022 and on Hulu on February 15, 2022, as part of Hulu’s celebration of Black Stories for Black History Month.
