= Meagan Good =

American actress (born 1981)

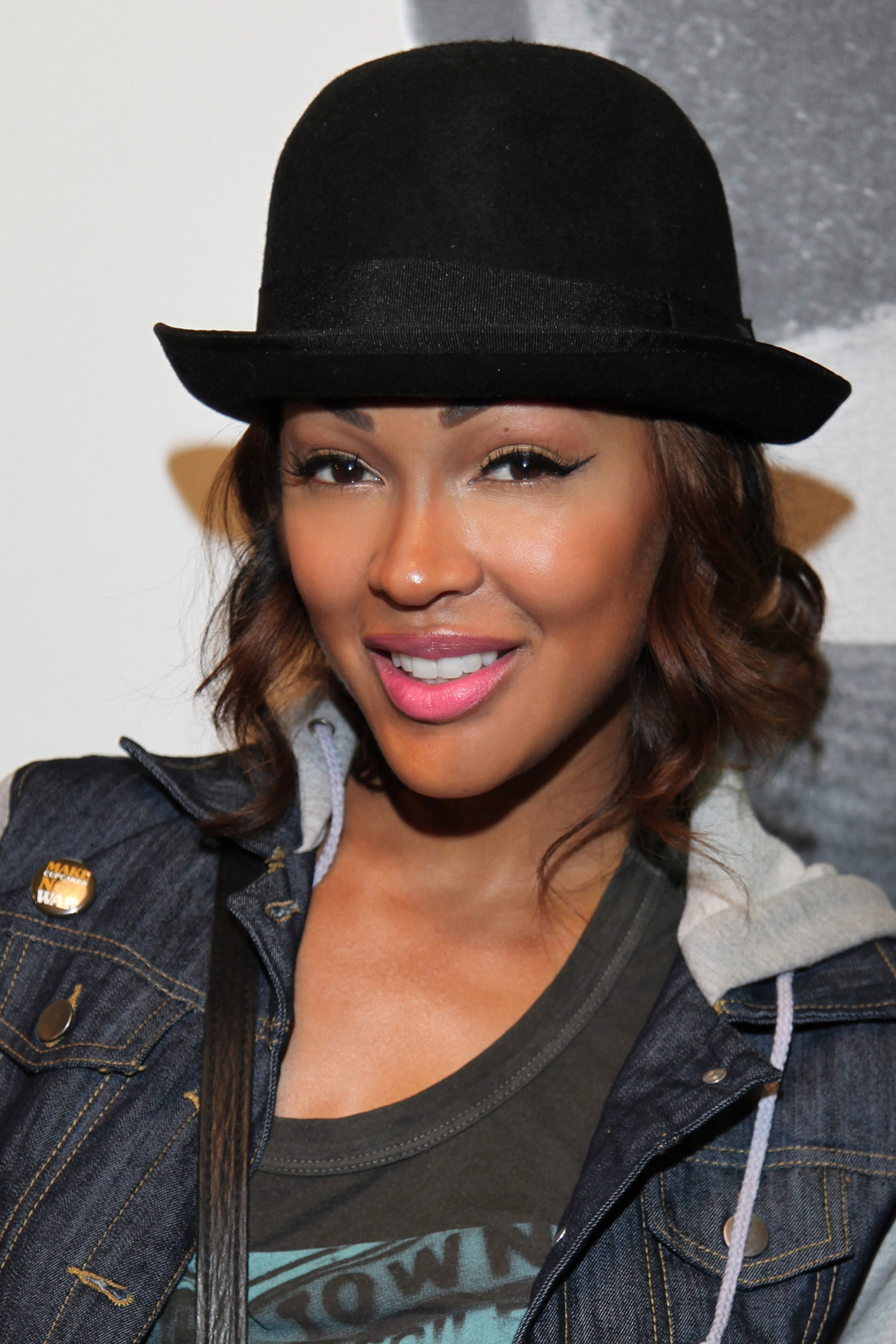
- Good in 2012
- Born: Meagan Monique Good; August 8, 1981 (age 45); Los Angeles, California, U.S.
- Other names: Meagan Good-Franklin; Meagan Good Majors
- Citizenship: United States; Guinea
- Occupations: Actress, model
- Years active: 1991–present
- Spouses: DeVon Franklin (m. 2012; div. 2022); Jonathan Majors (m. 2025)
- Relatives: La'Myia Good (sister); Dijon Talton (cousin); Eric Bellinger (brother-in-law)
- Website: meaganmgood.com

Meagan Monique Good Majors (born August 8, 1981) is an American actress and model. She first gained critical attention for her role in the film Eve's Bayou (1997) prior to landing the role of Nina in the Nickelodeon sitcom Cousin Skeeter (1998–2001). Good received further prominence after starring in the films Deliver Us from Eva (2003), Roll Bounce (2005) and Stomp the Yard (2007).

In 2012, Good featured in an ensemble cast of the film Think Like a Man. The following year, she played Joanna Locasto, the lead character on the NBC drama series Deception, and starred in the comedy Anchorman 2: The Legend Continues. Good has also had supporting roles in the films One Missed Call (2008), Saw V (2008), The Unborn (2009), and as the superhero version of Darla Dudley in the DCEU films Shazam! (2019) and Shazam! Fury of the Gods (2023). She co-produced and starred in Tyler Perry's Divorce in the Black (2024) for Amazon Prime Video.

== Early life and family ==
Good was born on August 8, 1981 in the Panorama City neighborhood of Los Angeles. Her mother, Tyra Wardlow-Doyle, worked as Good's manager into her teens, and her father, Leondis "Leon" Good, is an LAPD police officer. Good was raised in Canyon Country (now known as Santa Clarita), California. She has three siblings, including older sister and fellow actress La'Myia Good. She began her acting career around the age of four.

According to Good, she grew up "super nerdy, super skinny, buckteeth, big ole afro and yet I had a sense of confidence about myself, like, 'they just don't get it yet.'" She has stated that she did not have any role models until early adulthood, when she began admiring actress Charlize Theron.

== Career ==
=== Childhood ===
In the early stages of her career, Good worked as an extra on television shows such as Doogie Howser, M.D. and Amen. When she was 13, Good was cast in her first film, the 1995 comedy Friday. She first gained critical recognition for her performance as the troubled teen Cisely Batiste in Kasi Lemmons' 1997 film Eve's Bayou; she received two award nominations, including her first NAACP Image Award nomination.

=== Adulthood ===
From 1998 to 2001, Good appeared as Nina on Nickelodeon's TV show Cousin Skeeter. During this time, she landed small roles in the films 3 Strikes and House Party 4: Down to the Last Minute. Good also appeared in many music videos, by artists such as 50 Cent, ("21 Questions"), Imajin, Isyss (of which Good's sister La'Myia Good was a member), Lil' Johnny, Memphis Bleek, Tyrese, and Will Smith. After taking on small film and television roles for the next few years, Good began to transition into more mature roles in the early 2000s. Good believes she was able to move into adult roles due to playing characters several years younger than her.

In 2003, a major year for Good, she landed roles in the action-drama Biker Boyz and the romantic-comedy Deliver Us from Eva, which helped her transition from child to adult actress. She also appeared as the character Vanessa for one season of My Wife and Kids, before being replaced by another actress. In 2004, Good starred alongside Jordana Brewster, Sara Foster, and Jill Ritchie in the action film D.E.B.S., and received a Best Actress nomination at the 2005 Black Movie Awards. She also had small roles in the teen dance film You Got Served, and Lance "Un" Rivera's directorial debut, The Cookout.

In 2005, Good co-starred in the horror film Venom, as well as the well-received neo noir film Brick. She played opposite rapper/actor Bow Wow in Malcolm D. Lee's Roll Bounce. In 2006, Good played the role of Coco, which she felt was her first true lead actress role, in the urban action-drama Waist Deep. Good also voiced a character for the video game Scarface: The World Is Yours that same year. The following year, Good landed a role in the dance movie Stomp the Yard, starring with Ne-Yo and childhood and personal friend Columbus Short. In 2008, Good appeared in the horror film One Missed Call as an ill-fated college student, Shelley Baum. She appeared as an angry trophy wife in the Mike Myers comedy The Love Guru, and in the latter half of the year, she was one of the victims/game players in Saw V. She starred in 2009's The Unborn with Gary Oldman and Odette Yustman.

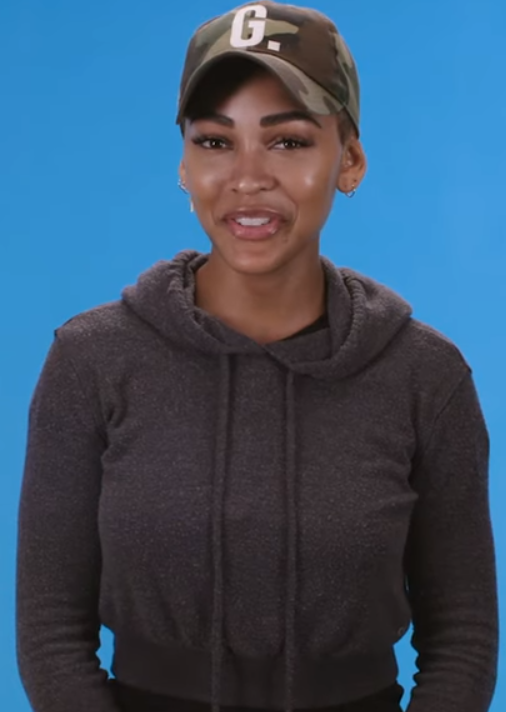
Good in 2019

In 2010, Good started her own production company, Freedom Bridge Entertainment, with Marlon Olivera and fellow actors Tamara Bass and Ty Hodges. She was part of the ensemble cast in 2012's Think Like a Man, a movie based on Steve Harvey's 2009 book Act like a Lady, Think like a Man. In 2013, Good starred in Anchorman 2: The Legend Continues. Good returned to television from January to March 2013, starring in Deception after being contacted by her agents about the series while leaving a hair salon. According to the actress, she sat in her car "and cried for 30-minutes like a nerd, by myself."

On June 30, 2013, Good wore a royal blue dress designed by Michael Costello to the 2013 BET Awards ceremony. The dress featured a plunging neckline down to her midriff and a front slit that rose to mid-thigh; her nipples very prominently protruded through the fabric. It was sometimes compared to the Green Versace dress worn by Jennifer Lopez to the 42nd Annual Grammy Awards in 2000. Fashion & Style editors selected Good as "worst dressed" at the ceremony.

The dress was controversial also because Good was presenting the BET Award for Best Gospel Artist. According to Christine Thomasos of The Christian Post, Good has a history of defending her stylistic choices of presenting herself as a "sexy Christian". She had said earlier that year:

there is a classy way to do everything and there is nothing wrong with being sexy or having sex appeal and I think that I am definitely going to be someone who is boldly going to go out to the masses and be someone who say, 'Look! Women its okay' ...

Good responded on Instagram, expressing sadness that judgment had been passed on her, her character and her then-husband DeVon Franklin over what she wore to the ceremony. She said she picked the dress because she liked it and tried to express her individuality in her dress.

In 2014, Good reprised her role for Think Like a Man Too, the sequel to Think Like a Man. Good stated she "had a really good time" while filming the sequel in Las Vegas after initially being nervous "because there's so much energy that only Vegas can give."

In January 2017, Good took a government-sponsored trip to Israel, together with actors Mark Pellegrino, Daniel Dae Kim, Sonequa Martin-Green and Kenric Green, as part of an effort to combat the Boycott, Divestment and Sanctions (BDS) movement.

Good later co-starred with Larenz Tate and Lance Gross in the 2017 Netflix film Deuces, and was star of 2019's The Intruder. She also appeared in the movies Monster Hunter (2020) and Day Shift (2022). In 2024, Good had a lead role in Tyler Perry's Divorce in the Black. She and actor Taye Diggs then starred in and executive produced Terry McMillan Presents: Forever, a Lifetime original movie.

== Personal life ==
Although she was not raised in the church, Good is a Protestant, considers herself a spiritual person and has said in numerous interviews that she declines roles that she feels might "disappoint God." She explained in an interview that Jesus tops her list of heroes, and the last book she read was the Bible.

At age 22, Good chose to focus on her career rather than dating, as she explained in a 2004 interview. In 2011, Good began dating DeVon Franklin, an executive for Columbia Pictures and a Seventh-day Adventist preacher. They became engaged in early April 2012, and were married on June 16, 2012, at Triunfo Creek Winery in Malibu, California. The pair stated that they remained chaste in their relationship prior to their marriage. In December 2021, it was announced Good and Franklin were divorcing after nine years of marriage. Their divorce was finalized in June 2022.

In May 2023, Good began dating actor Jonathan Majors. In November 2024, the two announced their engagement at Ebony magazine's Power 100 event, where they first met in 2022. The couple married in March 2025. They acquired Guinean citizenship in 2026 after DNA testing traced their ancestry back to the country.

== Filmography ==
=== Film ===
Year	Title	Role	Notes
1995	Make a Wish, Molly	Jenny	Short
1995	Friday	Kid #2	
1997	Eve's Bayou	Cisely Batiste	
1999	The Secret Life of Girls	Kay	
2000	3 Strikes	Buela Douglas	
2000	New Kids on the Planet	Nina Jones	Cousin Skeeter TV Movie
2001	House Party 4: Down to the Last Minute	Tina Johnson	Video
2003	Biker Boyz	Tina	
2003	Deliver Us from Eva	Jacqui Dandridge	
2003	Ride or Die	Fake Venus	Video
2004	D.E.B.S.	Max Brewer	
2004	You Got Served	"Beautifull"	
2004	The Cookout	Brittany	
2005	Brick	Kara	
2005	Venom	Cece	
2005	Roll Bounce	Naomi Phillips	
2006	Miles from Home	Natasha Freeman	
2006	Waist Deep	Constance "Coco" Taylor	
2007	Stomp the Yard	April Palmer	
2008	One Missed Call	Shelley Baum	
2008	The Love Guru	Prudence Roanoke	
2008	Saw V	Luba Gibbs	
2009	The Unborn	Romy Marshall	
2011	Jumping the Broom	Blythe	
2011	Video Girl	Lorie Walker	
2011	35 and Ticking	Falinda	
2012	LUV	Beverly	
2012	Dysfunctional Friends	Victoria Stevens	
2012	Think Like a Man	Mya	
2012	Defeat the Label	Herself	Short
2012	The Obama Effect	Tamika Jones	
2012	Dick Little	Megan	
2013	Don Jon	Hollywood Actress #2	
2013	Anchorman 2: The Legend Continues	Linda Jackson	
2014	Think Like a Man Too	Mya	
2015	A Girl Like Grace	Share	
2015	Charlie, Trevor and a Girl Savannah	Herself	
2017	Deuces	Janet Foster	
2017	Love by the 10th Date	Gabrielle Fateful	TV movie
2018	A Boy. A Girl. A Dream.	"Free"	
2019	Shazam!	Super Hero Darla	
2019	The Intruder	Annie Russell	
2019	If Not Now, When?	Tyra	Also director and producer
2020	Monster Hunter	Dash	
2021	Death Saved My Life	Jade Thompson	TV movie
2022	Day Shift	Jocelyn Jablonski	
2023	Shazam! Fury of the Gods	Super Hero Darla	
2023	Buying Back My Daughter	Dana	TV movie
2024	Divorce in the Black	Ava	
2024	Terry McMillan Presents: Forever	Carlie	Also executive producer
2025	I’ll Never Let You Go	Emily Westover	Also executive producer

=== Television ===
Year	Title	Role	Notes
1991	Gabriel's Fire	Young Girl	Episode: "Birds Gotta Fly"
1994	On Our Own	Traycee	Episode: "Swiss Family Jerricos"
1996	ABC Afterschool Special	Janie	Episode: "Me and My Hormones"
1997	Pacific Blue	Shalona James	Episode: "Blood for Blood"
1997	Touched by an Angel	Nikki	Episode: "The Pact"
1997	The Gregory Hines Show	Pauley	Episode: "Three's Not Company"
1997–1998	The Parent 'Hood	Ariana	Recurring Cast: Season 4
1998	Nothing Sacred	Carissa	Episode: "Signs and Words"
1998–2001	Cousin Skeeter	Nina Jones	Main Cast
1999–2002	The Jersey	Tamika	Recurring Cast: Season 1, Guest: Season 3 Episode: "The Playbook"
2000	Moesha	Nicole	Episode: "He Doth Protest Too Much"
2000	The Steve Harvey Show	Alicia	Episode: "Don't Stand Too Close to Me"
2001	The Division	Kara Taylor	Episode: "The Parent Trap"
2001	The Famous Jett Jackson	Tara Essex	Episodes: "Awakenings 1 & 2"
2001–2002	Raising Dad	Katie	Recurring Cast
2003	My Wife and Kids	Vanessa Scott	Recurring Cast: Season 3
2005	Kevin Hill	Melanie West	Recurring Cast
2007	Punk'd	Herself	Episode: "Episode #8.5"
2007	106 & Park Top 10 Live	Herself / Host	Episode: "106 and Park Celebration Week: T.I. and Meagan Good Holding It Down"
2007	House	Amy	Episode: "Words and Deeds"
2007	All of Us	Katie	Recurring Cast: Season 4
2009	Cold Case	Beatrice Sloan (1970)	Episode: "Soul"
2011	The Game	Parker Keith	Recurring Cast: Season 4
2012	Californication	Kali	Recurring Cast: Season 5
2012	Harry's Law	Cecilia	Episode: "And the Band Played On"
2013	Deception	Joanna Locasto	Main Cast
2014	Unsung Hollywood	Herself	Episode: "Pam Grier"
2014	The Dead Diaries	Alexis	Episode: "Massacre"
2014	Law & Order: Special Victims Unit	Paula Bryant	Episode: "Spousal Privilege"
2015	Mr. Robinson	Victoria Wavers	Recurring Cast
2015	Minority Report	Detective Lara Vega	Main Cast
2016	Unsung Hollywood	Herself	Episode: "Meagan Good"
2016	Code Black	Dr. Grace Adams	Recurring Cast: Season 1
2017	The Talk	Herself / Guest Co-Host	Episode: "Guest Co-Hostess Meagan Good/Jenna Dewan-Tatum/Kevin Frazier"
2017	White Famous	Kali	Recurring Cast
2018	The Hollywood Puppet Show	Herself	Episode: "Meagan Good and Lil Rel Howery"
2018	Star	Natalie Knight	Recurring Cast: Season 2
2019–2020	Prodigal Son	Special Agent Colette	Recurring Cast: Season 1
2020	To Tell the Truth	Herself / Panelist	Episode: "Jeannie Mai, Craig Robinson, Bobby Moynihan, Meagan Good"
2021	Celebrity Game Face	Herself	Episode: "Bid on Bae and Puppet Charades"
2021	American Masters	Herself	Episode: "How It Feels To Be Free"
2021	Overserved with Lisa Vanderpump	Herself	Episode: "A Night in Morocco: Jeannie Mai & Meagan Good"
2021	Entertainment Tonight	Herself / Guest Co-Host	Episode: "Episode #40.101"
2022	Celebrity Family Feud	Herself / Contestant	Episode: "The Musical: The Series vs. Never Have I Ever and Ron Funches vs. Meagan Good"
2022	The Black Beauty Effect	Herself	Recurring Guest
2021–2025	Harlem	Camille	Main Cast
2023	Uncensored	Herself	Episode: "Meagan Good"
2023	The Eric Andre Show	Herself	Episode: "The Cold Episode"
2025	The Jason Lee Show	Herself	Season 3: Episode 9

=== Video games ===
Year	Title	Voice role
2006	Scarface: The World Is Yours	Femme Fatale Stacey

=== Music videos ===
Year	Artist	Song	Role
1999	Imajin	"No Doubt"	Herself
2001	Memphis Bleek featuring Jay-Z	"Do My..."	Herself
2003	50 Cent featuring Nate Dogg	"21 Questions"	Girlfriend

=== Documentary ===
Year	Title
2007	Angels Can't Help But Laugh
2009	Good Hair
2018	3 Years in Pakistan: The Erik Aude Story

== Accolades ==
Year	Association	Category	Nominated work	Result
1998	NAACP Image Awards	Outstanding Youth Actor/Actress	Eve's Bayou	Nominated
1998	YoungStar Awards	Best Performance by a Young Actress in a Drama Film	Eve's Bayou	Nominated
2006	Teen Choice Awards	Choice Breakout (Female)	Waist Deep	Nominated
2007	Teen Choice Awards	Choice Movie Actress: Drama	Stomp the Yard	Nominated
2006	Black Reel Awards	Best Ensemble	Roll Bounce (Shared with cast)	Nominated
2007	MTV Movie Awards	Best Kiss	Stomp the Yard (Shared with Columbus Short)	Nominated
2008	NAACP Image Awards	Outstanding Supporting Actress in a Motion Picture	Stomp the Yard	Nominated
2012	Teen Choice Awards	Choice Movie Actress Romance	Think Like a Man	Nominated

== See also ==
- List of Afro-Latinos
- List of Puerto Ricans
