= Big Mike (rapper) =

American rapper (born 1971)

- Also known as: The PeterMan; Nawlins' Phats
- Born: Michael Barnett; New Orleans, Louisiana, U.S.
- Origin: Houston, Texas
- Genres: Hip-hop
- Occupations: Rapper; songwriter
- Years active: 1991–present
- Labels: Rap-A-Lot Records; Noo Trybe Records; Suave House Records
- Member of: Geto Boys

Michael Barnett, better known by his stage name Big Mike, is an American rapper. He was born in New Orleans and grew up in Houston. He joined the Geto Boys, a hip-hop group from Houston, in 1992.

== Discography ==
=== Studio albums ===
- Somethin' Serious (1994) #40 Billboard 200; #4 R&B/Hip Hop
- Still Serious (1997) #16 Billboard 200; #3 R&B/ Hip Hop
- Hard to Hit (1999) #63 Billboard 200; #13 R&B/ Hip Hop
- Nawlins Phats (2005)
- Keep It Playa (2006)
- Serious as Can Be (2009)
- Ridah Music Vol.1 (The Invitation) (2009)
- The Reintroduction (2010)
- Bayou Classic – Love.Faith.Honor.Loyalty (2011)
- Fast Boy Music (2013)
- O.G. Big Mike (2017)
- Finish The Job (2020)
- Concurrent (2026)

=== Collaborative albums ===
- Convicts with Convicts (1991)
- Till Death Do Us Part with Geto Boys (1993)

=== Mixtapes ===
- Full Circle (2011)

=== Guest appearances ===
- ”Sons of the Boulevard”, from the album We Will No Longer Retreat Into Darkness (by The Mighty Rhino, also featuring Illvibe) (2018)
- ”The Flyness”, from the album Northern Flavalistic Metropass Muzik (by The Mighty Rhino & Skizza) (2024)
