= Day & Night (Isyss song) =

2002 song by Isyss

Single by Isyss featuring Jadakiss

from the album The Way We Do
- Released: July 2, 2002
- Recorded: November 14–15, 2001
- Genre: R&B, hip hop soul
- Length: 3:51
- Label: Arista
- Songwriter(s): Tyrice Jones, Brande Kelley
- Producer(s): Tyrice Jones

Isyss singles chronology
"Day & Night" (2002)	"Single for the Rest of My Life" (2002)

Jadakiss singles chronology
"Put Ya Hands Up" (2001)	"Day & Night" (2002)	"Jenny from the Block" (2002)

"Day & Night" is a song by American R&B group Isyss featuring hip hop artist Jadakiss. The song was released as the first single for the group's debut album The Way We Do (2002). The music video for this song was directed by Bille Woodruff.

== Track listing ==
12", 33 1/3 RPM, Vinyl

1. "Day & Night" (Album Version) - 3:51
2. "Day & Night" (Instrumental) - 3:43
3. "Day & Night" (Acapella) - 3:29
4. "Day & Night" (Album Version) - 3:51
5. "Day & Night" (Instrumental) - 3:43
6. "Day & Night" (Acapella) - 3:29

CD

1. "Day + Night (Remix)" (Full Version) - 3:13
2. "Single For the Rest of My Life" (Snippet) - 1:20
3. "Stood Up" (Snippet) - 1:23
4. "No Na Na" (Snippet) - 1:20
5. "Hater" (Snippet) - 1:30

== Charts ==
Chart (2002)	Peak position
US Billboard Hot 100	98
US Hot R&B/Hip-Hop Songs (Billboard)	52

== Personnel ==
Information taken from Discogs.

- associate executive production – Gerry Griffin
- executive production – Billy Moss, Antonio "LA" Reid
- production – Tyrice Jones
- remixing – Kevin "She'kspere" Briggs
