= Ty Hodges =

American actor and director

- Born: Eric Tyrone Hodges II
- Occupations: Actor; screenwriter; director; producer
- Years active: 1997–present
- Known for: Even Stevens; Don't Look Under the Bed

Eric Tyrone "Ty" Hodges II is an American actor, director, and screenwriter. He is known primarily for his roles in Disney Channel films and television shows, including his role as Larry Houdini in Don't Look Under the Bed and Larry Beale in Even Stevens.

== Early life ==
Hodges grew up in Miami, Florida. He is of Trinidadian and Bajan descent.

== Career ==
At age 16, he appeared as the main character in Janet Jackson's "Go Deep" music video. He appeared as Larry Houdini in the Disney Channel Original Movie Don't Look Under The Bed and in a recurring role as Larry Beale on the Disney Channel series Even Stevens and The Even Stevens Movie.

He starred in MTV's reality show twentyfourseven. Other television credits include Boston Public, Felicity, and NYPD Blue. In 2006, Hodges appeared alongside Hilary Duff and Haylie Duff in the feature film Material Girls. Other film credits include Holes, The United States of Leland.

He has toured Japan with the musical act Voices United.

=== Director ===
Hodges has directed several movies. He directed the 2006 movie Miles from Home starring Meagan Good. He starred in and directed the 2015 film A Girl Like Grace, also starring Meagan Good and Raven-Symoné. He also directed the movie Venus as a Boy starring Olivia Culpo.

== Filmography ==
Year	Title	Role	Notes
1997	Kinetic City Super Crew		
1998	Oprah Winfrey Presents: David and Lisa	Raymond	TV movie
1999	Felicity	J.D.	1 episode
1999	Don't Look Under the Bed	Larry Houdini	Disney Channel Original Movie
1999	NYPD Blue	Purcell Watkins	1 episode
1999	The Famous Jett Jackson	Myles Conway	1 episode
2000	The King of Queens	Ron	1 episode
2000	Little Richard	Young Richard	TV movie
2000	City of Angels	Martin Coleman	1 episode
2000–2002	Even Stevens	Larry Beale	Disney Channel Original Series; Recurring Role (13 episodes)
2001	Raising Dad	Jesse	1 episode
2001	The Nightmare Room	Anthony	1 episode
2001	Boston Public	Peter	1 episode
2002	The Gray in Between	Trenny	Movie
2002	A Midsummer Night's Rave	Funky Raver	Movie
2002	Boomtown	Friend No. 1	1 episode
2002	The Andy Dick Show	Antoine	1 episode
2003	The Even Stevens Movie	Larry Beale	Disney Channel Original Movie
2003	The Challenge	Charles	TV movie
2003	Holes	Food Server	Movie
2003	The District	Luc Bertrand	1 episode
2003	The United States of Leland	Student	Movie
2005	Suits on the Loose	Tyler	Movie
2006	Material Girls	Etienne	Movie
2006	Miles from Home	Miles Conway	Movie (Director, writer, and Producer)
2008	Blues	Chile	Movie
2010	Krews	Slate	Movie
2011	Dance Fu	Jamal	Movie
2012	You, Me, & The Circus	Ralph	Movie (Director, writer, and Producer)
2012	Truth Unspoken Series	Sean	1 episode
2014	Lock In	Michael Monroe	Short
2014	Meet Me in Montenegro	Robert	Movie
2015	A Girl Like Grace	Matt	Movie (Director, writer, and Producer)
2015	Charlie, Trevor and a Girl Savannah	Charlie	Movie (Director, writer, and Producer)
2021	Venus as a Boy	Hunter	Movie (Director, writer, and Producer)
