= Somethin' Serious =

Studio album by Big Mike
- Released: June 28, 1994
- Recorded: 1993–1994
- Studios: Digital Services (Houston, TX); Jungle Style (Houston, TX)
- Genres: Southern hip hop; gangsta rap
- Length: 54:35
- Labels: Rap-A-Lot; Priority
- Producers: N.O. Joe; Big Mike; Troy "Pee Wee" Clark; Pimp C; Mike Dean; Mike B.; John Bido; Crazy C

Big Mike chronology
Till Death Do Us Part (1993)	Somethin' Serious (1994)	Still Serious (1997)

Somethin' Serious is the debut solo studio album by American rapper Big Mike of the Geto Boys. It was released on June 28, 1994, by Rap-A-Lot Records and Priority Records. It was produced by N.O. Joe, Troy Clark, Pimp C, John Bido, Mike Dean, Crazy C, and Mike B. It features guest appearances from UGK, Scarface, and Mr. 3-2. The album peaked at number 40 on the Billboard 200 chart and at number 4 on the Top R&B/Hip-Hop Albums chart. It launched the charting single "World of Mind", which peaked at number 45 on the Hot Rap Songs chart. Somethin' Serious was certified Gold four months after release, the LP remains Big Mike's only RIAA certification.

== Critical reception ==
Professional ratings
Review scores
Source	Rating
AllMusic	4/5 stars

The Orlando Sentinel opined that Big Mike's "solo spinoff is good in doses, but he doesn't seem to have enough ideas to spread over the course of an entire album."

== Track listing ==
No.	Title	Producer(s)	Length
1.	"Comin from the Swamp"	N.O. Joe; Big Mike	3:44
2.	"World of Mind"	N.O. Joe	4:26
3.	"Ghetto Love"	N.O. Joe; Big Mike	2:59
4.	"Creepin — Rollin"	Mike Dean; Big Mike	4:21
5.	"Smoke Em & Choke Em"	Crazy C	4:08
6.	"Havin Thangs" (featuring Pimp C)	Pimp C	4:48
7.	"On da Real"	John Bido	3:37
8.	"Playa Playa"	N.O. Joe	4:48
9.	"Southern Thang"	Troy "Pee Wee" Clark	1:41
10.	"Somethin Serious"	Mike B.	3:45
11.	"Get Over That"	N.O. Joe	4:33
12.	"Fire" (featuring Mr. 3-2)	Troy "Pee Wee" Clark; Big Mike	4:05
13.	"Daddy's Gone" (featuring Scarface)	N.O. Joe	4:32
14.	"On da 1" (featuring Tre'Mendous & UGK)	Big Mike; Pimp C	3:08
Total length:			54:35

== Sample credits ==
Fire

- "Fire" by Ohio Players

Havin' Thangs

- "Good Old Music" by Funkadelic

Playa Playa

- "What a Wonderful Thing Love Is" by Al Green

Smoke 'Em & Choke 'Em

- "Goodbye, So Long" by Funk, Inc.

Somethin' Serious

- "Outstanding" by the Gap Band

Get Over That

- "Funkin' for Jamaica (N.Y.)" by Tom Browne

Southern Thang

- "People Say" by the Meters

== Personnel ==
- Michael Barnett – main artist, producer (tracks: 1, 3, 4, 12, 14), mixing, assistant engineering
- Chad Lamont Butler – featured artist & producer (tracks: 6, 14)
- Christopher Juel Barriere – featured artist (track 12)
- Brad Terrence Jordan – featured artist (track 13)
- Bernard Freeman – featured artist (track 14)
- Michael "DJ Domination" Poye – scratches
- Joseph Johnson – producer (tracks: 1–3, 8, 11, 13), mixing
- Troy Clark – producer (tracks: 9, 12), mixing
- Michael George Dean – producer (track 4), mixing, engineering, mastering
- John Okuribido – producer (track 7), mixing
- Simon Cullins – producer (track 5)
- Michael Banks – producer (track 10)
- James A. Smith – executive producer
- John Moran – mastering
- Patrick Nixon – art direction
- Sheila Pree – photography

== Charts ==
=== Weekly charts ===
Chart (1994)	Peak position
US Billboard 200	40
US Top R&B/Hip-Hop Albums (Billboard)	4

=== Year-end charts ===
Chart (1994)	Position
US Top R&B/Hip-Hop Albums (Billboard)	29

== Certifications ==
Region	Certification	Certified units/sales
United States (RIAA)	Gold	500,000^{^}
^{^} Shipments figures based on certification alone.
