= Noela Rukundo =

Burundian-Australian woman

- Born: Burundi
- Spouse: Balenga Kalala (m. 2004; sep. 2015)

Noela Rukundo is a Burundian-Australian woman who became notable for crashing her own funeral. In January 2015, she was presumed dead after her husband, Balenga Kalala, secretly paid several gunmen to kill her while she was in Burundi for her stepmother's funeral. Unbeknownst to Kalala, the gunmen had refused to kill Rukundo, though they told him they had. They released her two days later and gave her evidence to incriminate her husband for his plans to have her murdered.

Following Rukundo's own funeral in February 2015, where Kalala told attendees that she had been killed in a tragic accident, she arrived at the couple's house in Australia unannounced to confront him. Kalala was later charged with incitement to murder and sentenced to nine years in prison.

== Background and attempted hit ==
Noela Rukundo emigrated from Burundi to Australia as a refugee in 2004, a mother of five at the time. Soon after, she met Balenga Kalala, a Congolese forklift operator and refugee who had also arrived in 2004 to flee a rebel army that had killed his wife and child when he was 24 years old. The two shared a social worker at a resettlement agency they both went to, who would often ask Kalala, who spoke English, to help translate for Rukundo, who spoke Swahili. The two started a relationship and moved in together in the Kings Park suburb of Melbourne, and soon got married and had three children together.

Kalala began to wrongly suspect that Rukundo was cheating on him, and paid nearly $7,000 to a group of gunmen to kill her. On 21 January 2015, while Rukundo was staying at a hotel in Bujumbura to attend her stepmother's funeral in Burundi, she spoke with Kalala on the phone, who instructed her to go outside to get some fresh air. Almost immediately after walking out of her hotel, she was confronted at gunpoint by a man who forced her into a car, where there were two other armed men waiting inside. They blindfolded her and drove her to a rural warehouse, where she was tied to a chair. There, a fourth man revealed that Kalala had ordered for them to kill her, but that they would not do it since they knew her brother and they refused to kill women and children. Although she initially did not believe that her husband had tried to have her murdered, the kidnappers proved this to her by calling Kalala on speaker phone. On the call, he confirmed that he wanted her dead, which caused Rukundo to faint.

The gunmen explained to Rukundo that they would keep Kalala's money, but tell him that they killed her, and that they would charge him an extra $3,400 to have the job finished. While Rukundo was still missing, her brother, who was also in Burundi, began to worry. He called Kalala and asked him to send $545 so that the police could investigate her disappearance, which Kalala sent. On 19 February, the kidnappers dropped Rukundo off on the side of the road with an envelope filled with evidence to incriminate Kalala, including recordings of phone conversations with him planning Rukundo's murder as well as two receipts from Western Union for the $7,000 payment. They told her that she had 80 hours to leave the country.

== Confrontation and aftermath ==
In Melbourne, Kalala prepared a funeral for Rukundo, who, he told members of the African community in Melbourne, had been killed in a tragic accident. Rukundo, meanwhile, contacted the Kenyan and Belgian embassies to help her return to Melbourne. She also called the pastor of her church in Melbourne, to whom she explained that she was still alive and asked for his help. After returning to Melbourne on 22 February, she arrived at her house, where a final group of mourners had just left her funeral. When she stepped out of the car, Kalala put his hands on his head and looked scared. He asked, "Is it a ghost?" He touched her shoulder to see if she was really there, and jumped when he realized she was, to which Rukundo replied, "Surprise! I'm still alive!" Kalala screamed and began profusely apologizing to Rukundo, who called the police on him.

After obtaining a court order against him, the police secretly recorded a conversation between him and Rukundo in which he begged for her forgiveness and confessed to ordering the hit on Rukundo. After being arrested, Kalala denied that he had ordered for Rukundo to be murdered. However, after police played the recording of him admitting to hiring the gunmen to kill her, he began to cry. His explanation for attempting to have Rukundo murdered was that "sometimes [the] devil can come into someone to do something". On 11 December 2015, Kalala was charged by a court in Melbourne with incitement to murder, and sentenced to nine years in prison; he is eligible for parole as of 2022. Members of the Congolese community threatened Rukundo for reporting Kalala.

== In popular culture ==
The 2021 Lifetime film Death Saved My Life, about a woman named Jade (played by Meagan Good) who fakes her own death after her abusive husband orders a hitman to kill her, was based on Rukundo's story. Also in 2021, a TikTok video about Rukundo's story went viral online.

== See also ==
- List of kidnappings
