= Isyss =

American contemporary R&B group

- Origin: Los Angeles, California, United States
- Genres: R&B; pop; hip hop; soul
- Years active: 2001–2006
- Labels: Arista
- Past members: LeTecia Harrison; Ardena Clark; La'Myia Good; Quierra "Qui Qui" Davis-Martin

Isyss was an American R&B girl group. The original members consisted of LeTecia Harrison, Ardena Clark, Quierra "Qui Qui" Davis-Martin and La'Myia Good (older sister of actress Meagan Good).

== Discography ==
Album information
The Way We Do
- Released: September 24, 2002 on Arista
- Chart position: #55 US (Peaked – October 19, 2002)

Year	Song	Top 100	Hot R&B	Album
2002	"Day & Night" (featuring Jadakiss)	98	52	The Way We Do
2002	"Single for the Rest of My Life"	71	62	The Way We Do

== Music videos ==
Year	Video	Director
2002	"Day and Night" (featuring Jadakiss)	Bille Woodruff
2002	"Single For the Rest of My Life"	Erik White

== Guest appearances ==
Year	Song	Album
2006	"Time to Creep*" (Mark Morrison featuring Isyss)	Innocent Man

* indicates the single was not released for promotional purposes.
