= 2006 protests in Hungary =

2006 anti-government protests in Hungary

2006 Hungarian protests
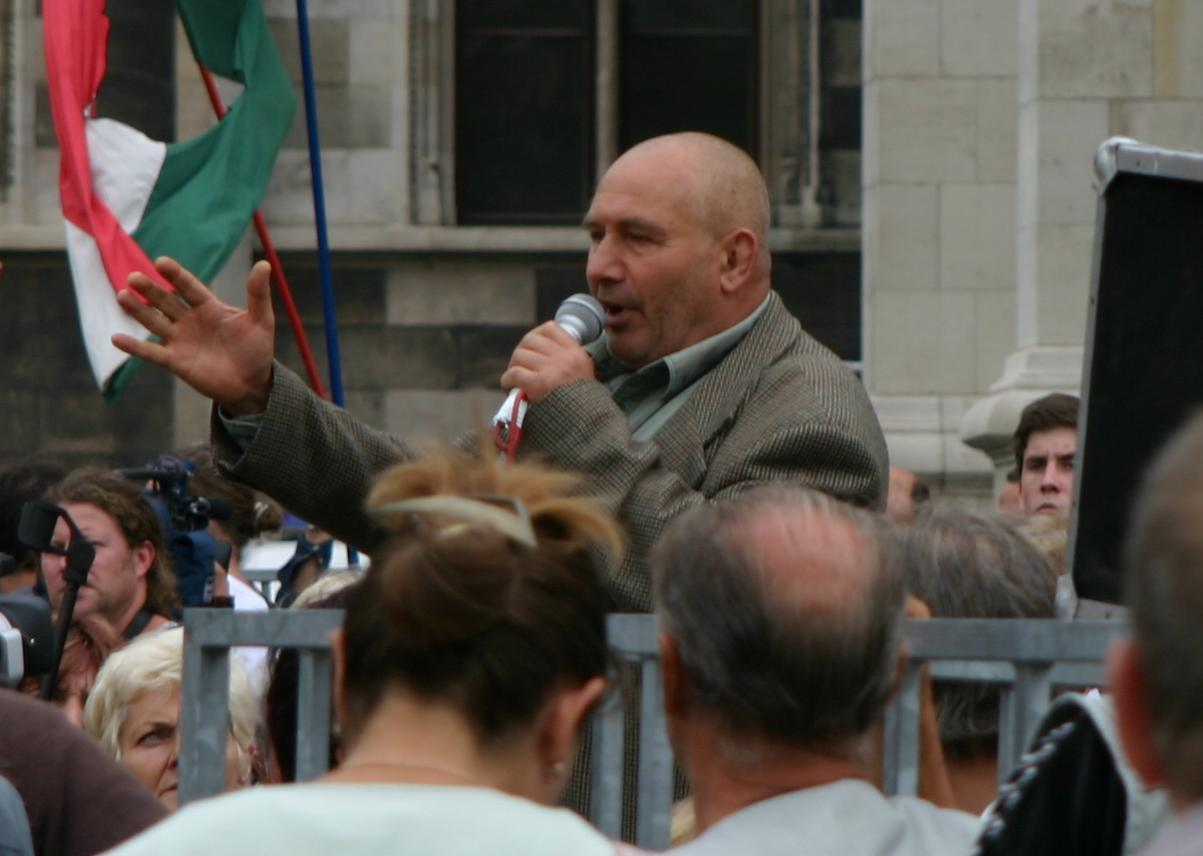
- György Ekrem-Kemál speaking at a rally near the Parliament Building
- Date: 17 September – 4 November 2006 (1 month, 2 weeks and 4 days)
- Location: Budapest and other cities, Hungary
- Caused by: Ferenc Gyurcsány's speech in Balatonőszöd in May 2006; Economic austerity measures
- Goals: Resignation of the government; Early parliamentary elections
- Methods: Demonstrations; Civil resistance; Civil disobedience; Online activism; Riots; Occupation of MTV Headquarters
- Result: Government lost 2006 local elections; Political crisis until 2008; Hungarian fees abolishment referendum, 2008

Parties
| (Hungary) Political opposition: Protesters of Kossuth tér; Hungarian National Committee 2006; Revolutionary National Committee; Sixty-Four Counties Youth Movement; Inconnu Art Group; Fidesz–KDNP; MIÉP; Jobbik | Government of Hungary: Second Gyurcsány Government; MSZP; SZDSZ; Hungarian Police; REBISZ; National Security Office |

Lead figures
| Viktor Orbán (Hungary) László Gonda; László Toroczkai; György Ekrem-Kemál; György Budaházy | (Hungary) Ferenc Gyurcsány (Hungary) József Petrétei; Gábor Demszky (Hungary) László Bene (Hungary) Péter Gergényi |

Number
| Tens of thousands | |

Casualties
- Death: 0
- Injuries: Gönczöl Commission Report: 326 civilians; 399 police officers
- Arrested: 472

A series of anti-government protests in Hungary began in September 2006, triggered by the release of Hungarian Prime Minister Ferenc Gyurcsány's leaked private speech in which he confessed that his Hungarian Socialist Party (MSZP) had lied to win the 2006 election, and had done nothing worth mentioning in the previous four years of governing. Most of the events took place in Budapest and other major cities between 17 September and 23 October. It was the first sustained protest in Hungary since 1989.

== Disclosure of Őszöd speech ==
=== Audio recording ===
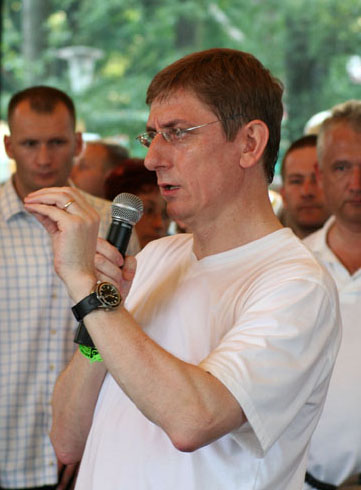
Prime Minister Ferenc Gyurcsány

On September 17, 2006, an audio recording surfaced from a closed-door MSZP meeting which was held on May 26, 2006, in which Hungarian Prime Minister Ferenc Gyurcsány made a speech, notable for its obscene language, including the following excerpt (censored version):

There is not much choice. There is not, because we screwed up. Not a little, a lot. No European country has done something as boneheaded as we have. Evidently, we lied throughout the last year-and-a-half, two years. It was totally clear that what we are saying is not true. You cannot quote any significant government measure we can be proud of, other than at the end we managed to bring the government back from the brink. Nothing. If we have to give account to the country about what we did for four years, then what do we say?

Gyurcsány also said things which can be interpreted as admitting having called for clandestine media or private capital support.

The Prime Minister confirmed the authenticity of the recording and uploaded its transcript on his blog, but remarked that "in a closed meeting a person speaks differently than in front of the cameras".

=== First reactions ===
Protesters listening to the radio – 0:04am, 18 Sep 2006

Protesters on their way back from the President's residency in Buda Castle – 2:12am, 18 Sep 2006

Late on Sunday, September 17, people gathered at the Parliament building demanding the PM should resign. By midnight, the number of demonstrators reached 2,000. A few hundred people went to the State President's residency but later returned. This spontaneous demonstration was entirely peaceful.

== September 18 ==
=== Budapest ===
==== Civil unrest ====
On September 18, as a consequence of the audio recording and the unwillingness of the Prime Minister or his party to resign, a demonstration was held near the Hungarian Parliament. Approximately 40,000 protesters demanded the resignation of Gyurcsány and his party for lying throughout the term and then during the campaign to win the next election. The police deemed the demonstration legal, arguing that the rules applicable during the campaign period towards the upcoming municipal elections allow for such short-notice political meetings.

==== Occupation of MTV Headquarters ====
After 23:00, a smaller group of the demonstrators tried to get into the Magyar Televízió public television building at Szabadság Tér (Liberty Square) to announce their demands on air. After they were not allowed to enter, a smaller group attacked the police forces. The riot police units which were intended to secure the building and the perimeter were ordered to disperse the crowd with tear gas and a water cannon. They blocked the main entrances but were unable to stop the attackers who could get inside the building. Some demonstrators became indignant at the authorities' resistance and were later joined by a group of enraged football ultras. A hardcore subgroup of them started to make repeated assaults in order to penetrate the defences and break into the building. The police retaliated, using tear gas and a water cannon. The crowd became enraged and attacked the police units by throwing cobblestones and debris (injuring 141 police officers), but they didn't attack the two drivers of the water cannon mobil. They also set several parked cars ablaze (which led to part of the building catching fire too) and eventually managed to enter the building, forcing the police back.

The demonstrators managed to voice their demands, but since the television station had already ceased its transmission due to the riot, it was not aired live. The building was abandoned about 02:30 by the police. After that, the mob entered the premises. Some of the intruders merely took pictures of themselves and the scene, while others destroyed the dining room and the main hall of the building. The historical television technology exhibition was also demolished: valuable vintage equipment was smashed and techno-historical objects like vintage props were stolen, as were some expensive plasma TV sets. Arson was also reported. All these acts were aired and/or verified by reports from state television officials, police and media coverage.

Police reinforcements arrived much later, and they managed to reclaim the building before dawn. Magyar Televízió resumed its transmission at 06:07. Over 150 people were injured, including 102 policemen. The property damage resulting from the fight is estimated to be over 230 million forints (about 800,000 EUR).

=== Other cities ===
In Miskolc on Monday (September 18), about 2,000 citizens protested on St. Stephen Square, where Árpád Miklós, chairman of the Hungarian Justice and Life Party's (MIÉP) county committee gave a speech, jokingly saying that Gyurcsány might as well join MIÉP as they had been calling Gyurcsány a liar for years, and now he himself had admitted to it, so they are on the same opinion now. People shouted anti-government remarks and sang the national anthem and the Szekler anthem, then marched to the nearby city hall. Later, at the proposal of the MIÉP chairman, they went to the Hungarian Socialist Party's (MSZP) headquarters on Corvin Street, which was secured by the police. Traffic was blocked by the demonstrators in parts of the inner city.

Also on Monday the Miskolc committee of opposition party Fidesz sent a press release to MTI (Hungarian News Agency) titled “One cannot build a city on lies” (a play on MSZP slogan We're building a brand new Miskolc which refers to the extensive downtown reconstruction program started by the party). In the press release, the committee declared that the seven members of parliament from MSZP's Miskolc committee, including Mayor Sándor Káli and deputy mayors Vilmos Fedor and Erika Szűcs must have known about Gyurcsány's lies, since all of them were present in Balatonőszöd and heard the Prime Minister's speech. Fidesz accused these members of parliament of becoming Gyurcsány's accomplices by keeping quiet.

== After the occupation of the TV headquarters ==
=== September 19 ===
==== Budapest ====
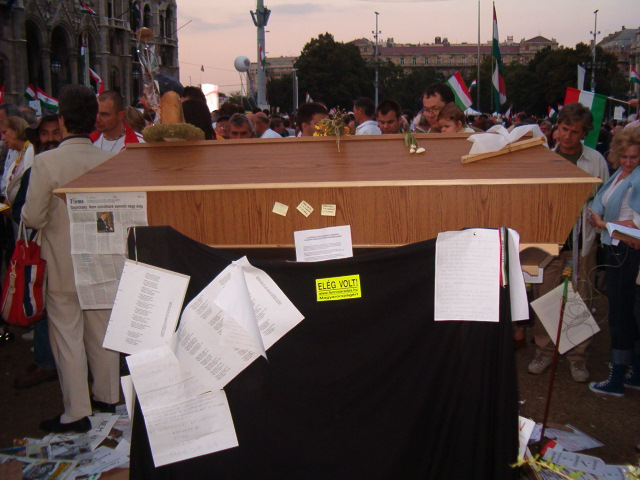
A coffin placed in Kossuth square by Inconnu Independent Art Group, symbolizing the end of the second Gyurcsány-government. The text on the yellow paper reads "We had enough!"

In the evening a mostly peaceful demonstration took place at Kossuth Square, aside from demonstrators vandalizing a tram on the Square and a car in front of the Socialist Party's county headquarters.

Later that night in other parts of the city, including the areas near the headquarters of MSZP and the HQ of the public radio station, violence broke out again. Large numbers of riot troops were deployed along with mounted police and K-9 units, acting more systematically than before. The use of tear gas and water cannons with accompanying mounted assaults prevented another building siege. Other police units applied police batons and body force.

At 01:00 (Sep 20), about 3,000 protesters gathered at Blaha Lujza Square. The crowd demanded the departure of Prime Minister Gyurcsány. Protesters threw stones and debris at the police, set a police car ablaze and even tried to build barricades but repeated police movements forced them back. By 09:00, the streets were cleared and more than 90 troublemakers were arrested with over 50 people injured. Most local media sources (including news television and news portals) covering the events referred to the attacking civilians as "troublemakers" or "rowdies", thus implying that these violent people were neither protesters nor peaceful civil demonstrators, but just a mob. The first rows of the masses were reported to behave aggressively, backed verbally by youngsters in the background. As opposed to the first night's siege, the crowd did not attack or hinder fire brigade and paramedics, but on one (probably unique) occasion it was observed that a mobster repeatedly kicked another civilian already lying on the ground. Live reports suggested that part of the mob also shouted claims that the violent acts were similar to those of the 1956 Revolution.

On the late night live talk show, Este (Evening), on the previously besieged MTV, Prime Minister Ferenc Gyurcsány was faced with the consequences of his actions, and the protesters' demands, when he read their petition which they managed to hand over the previous day. He replied that it was not just himself, but everybody who had lied, and he would not resign. He said he was committed to pushing through his austerity measures in any circumstances, without the possibility of even a minor change to it.

==== Other cities ====
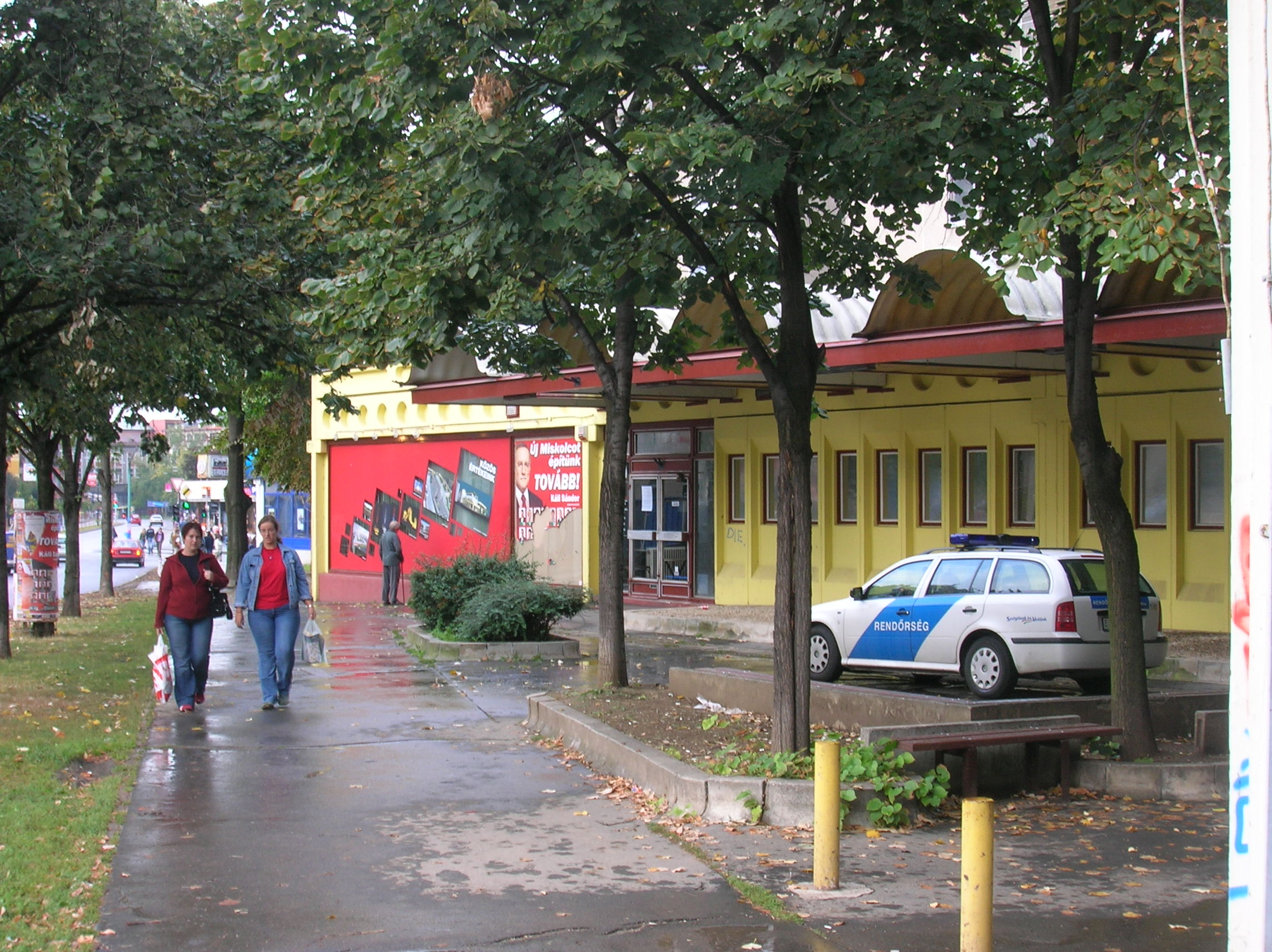
The party's county office, with the smashed window

In Miskolc, policemen, including police captain Albert Pásztor, were already at St. Stephen Square when the demonstrations began at 17:00. People held banners saying "Our homeland is not a 'whore country'", (A hazánk nem egy "kurva ország") referring to the Gyurcsány talk. The demonstrators again went to the city hall, then to the MSZP office, where at the request of a university student, a speaker read the proclamation of the protest planned on September 21 against tuition fees (the introduction of which was one of the most controversial decisions of Gyurcsány's government). The national anthem and Szózat were sung both at the city hall and at the MSZP office, while demonstrators stood with their backs to the buildings. Demonstrators demanded that a declaration be read in a local TV station, but the station's manager refused.

In Szeged at 19:00, 500–600 people protested against Gyurcsány but, within a few minutes, there were already thousands of demonstrators marching from the city hall to Dóm tér (Cathedral Square). From there, they went to the Socialist Party's building, which was defended by the police. The demonstration was continued on Tuesday before the City Hall, where about 3,000 people demanded the government's resignation, new elections, and democracy. Police secured the City Hall and the regional offices of Hungarian Television and Hungarian Radio.

The county chairman of Jobbik, the organizer of the demonstration, stated that they wanted to achieve their goal – the resignation of Gyurcsány's government – through peaceful demonstrations, which would continue every evening until September 23, when they would hold a demonstration in Budapest.

In Eger about 1,000 citizens demonstrated, demanding that President Sólyom dissolve the National Assembly. Demonstrators also requested the city's Socialist mayor Imre Nagy to initiate Gyurcsány's dismissal.

==== Romania ====
On Tuesday, several demonstrations of solidarity took place in Romania, in cities with a strong ethnic Hungarian population. In the evening, some 700 people took part in a peaceful candlelight vigil in Odorheiu Secuiesc (Hungarian: Székelyudvarhely). This event was organised by the Hungarian Civic Party, took place in a park in the city centre, and featured the reading of a declaration of solidarity with the non-violent protesters in Budapest. Protesters in Odorheiu Secuiesc also expressed their belief that the results of the 2004 referendum on dual citizenship in Hungary were fraudulent.

When asked about protesting in front of the Hungarian consulate in Miercurea Ciuc (Hungarian: Csíkszereda), Magyar Civic Union president Jenő Szász said that this would be futile, that "Premier Gyurcsány must resign in Budapest and not in Csíkszereda".

=== September 20 ===
==== Budapest ====
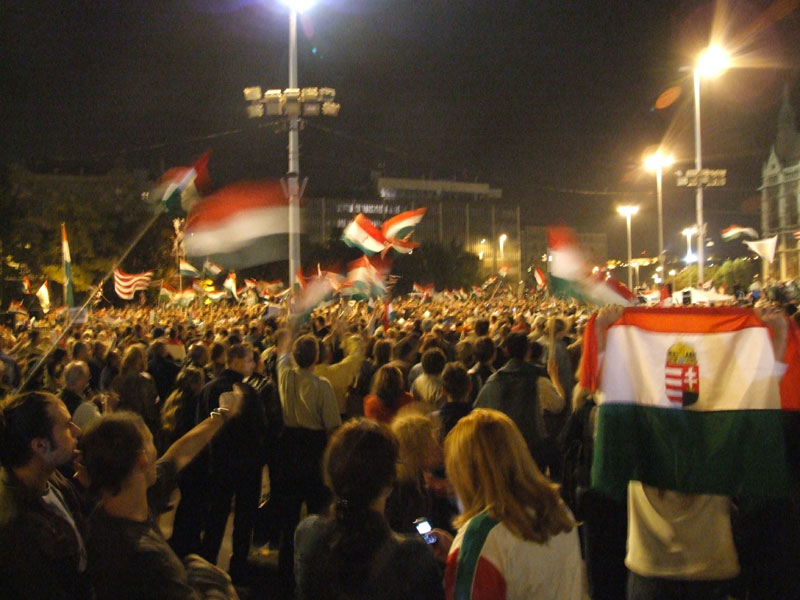
About 10,000 demonstrators at Kossuth Square – 10:54pm, 20 Sep 2006

During the daytime the capital city was peaceful, though ruins and debris from the previous night's clash scenes reminded the citizens that the crisis was far from being over.

Daytime announcements from different political personalities all agreed that violence must be avoided and control must be maintained at all reasonable costs. Police leaders promised an immediate, zero-tolerance reaction to any turmoil. Identification of violators and troublemakers went on all day by police, via analyzing news videos, and dedicated police/detective units made more than 100 arrests during the afternoon.

Riot police were also present at all important scenes, including Parliament, state public radio station, MSZP HQ, and they kept Szabadság Square (where the previously sieged state public television resides) tightly sealed. Nobody was allowed to enter the square except residents of its buildings, television staff and law enforcers. Police units were reinforced, equipped with new special full-size shields, steel helmets, bulletproof vests, and gas masks.

...and policemen facing them – 10:06pm, 20 Sep 2006

As night fell, reports came in of large scale purchasing of baseball bats at a sports warehouse. Later, a downtown restaurant was raided by the police because delivery of "long stick-like objects" was witnessed, but these turned out to be merely promotional umbrellas.

After 01:00, protesters began to gather on the Grand Boulevard (Nagykörút), around Nyugati Square and Oktogon Square. About 2,000 people began to walk along Andrássy Avenue, demanding the departure of Gyurcsány. This time there were no serious attacks against policemen or vandalism, but the troops soon stormed over the protesters and pursued them on the Grand Boulevard towards Nyugati Square and neighbouring streets. Cases of police brutality against peaceful protesters and passers-by were reported by eyewitnesses on Internet forums and articles. Overall, this night was remarkably controlled by massive police presence and their rapid response, vandalism was mostly prevented and there were no reports of stone-throwing assault or arson. During the night, 62 persons were arrested, of which 55 persons are now in custody and charged with aggressive crimes, bringing the total arrests to over 200.

An article on the Hungarian news portal index.hu illustrated with photos the fact that the Lonsdale youth manifesto could be observed during the unrest.

==== Other cities ====
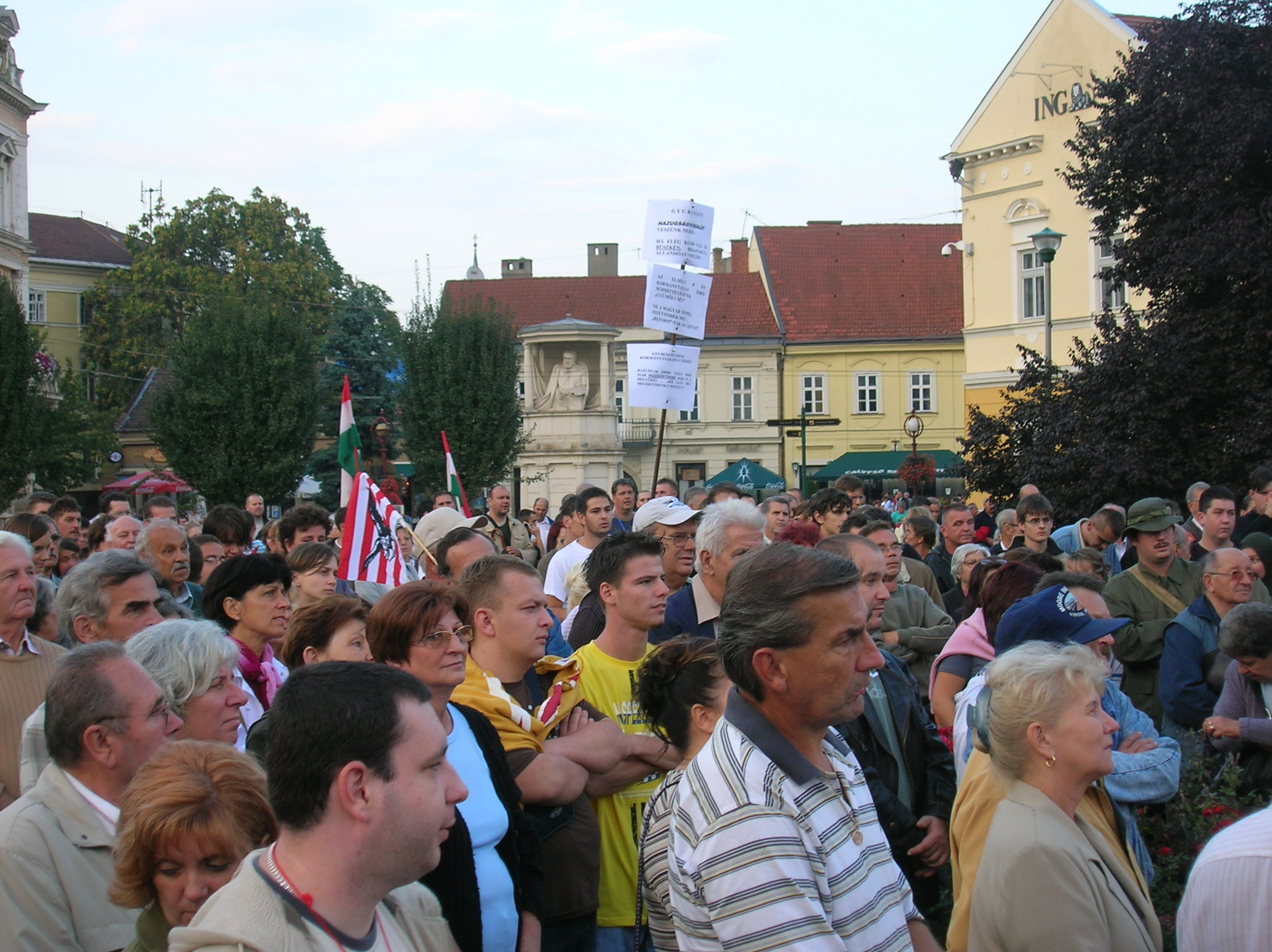
Wednesday at St. Stephen Square

Early on Wednesday the large window of the Socialist Party's office in Miskolc was smashed with a garbage can. Downtown, several MSZP placards of the upcoming local elections were vandalized. Late afternoon demonstrations started again on St. Stephen Square; police secured both the square and the MSZP office long before the demonstrators arrived. Speakers asked demonstrators to behave themselves and keep the demonstration peaceful. A student of the University of Miskolc informed the people that the university's student council withdrew its approval of the protest against tuition fees, but students would protest anyway.

In Debrecen the city's mayor Lajos Kósa (Fidesz) was taking an active part of the demonstrations; he supported his party's plans to keep a rally in Budapest on Saturday (the rally had been cancelled since), and heavily criticized Gábor Demszky, the mayor of Budapest for his perceived inactivity. ("It's possible Gábor Demszky doesn't feel Budapest his own and he thinks that he has nothing to do when such things happen in the capital, but Debrecen is another city, it has a local government which cares for the city.") He also asked the demonstrators not to attack the MSZP's county headquarters in the city, stating that the building is Debrecen's property and the party is only renting it. (A similar thing happened in Miskolc where a speaker jokingly mentioned that "we have the strength to break into the building, but we won't do it; that building will still be useful for something else.")

A peaceful rally was held in the main square of Pécs.

==== Other countries ====
- Romania: The Organisation of Transylvanian Magyar Youth held a demonstration on Wednesday at 18:00 in Marosvásárhely (Târgu-Mureş) to show solidarity with the Budapest protesters. This event took place in the yard of the Reformed Church in the Citadel. The demonstration remained peaceful, and those involved noted that they understood Hungarians' frustration while disagreeing with those who employed violent methods. Similar actions took place in Székelyudvarhely (Odorheiu Secuiesc), Sepsiszentgyörgy (Sfântu Gheorghe) and Csíkszereda (Miercurea-Ciuc).
- Serbia: A small protest took place in the town of Zenta (Senta) on this day. The demonstration was organised by a local ethnic Hungarian political party. These people wanted to show their sympathy for the demonstrators in Hungary because, in their opinion, all people who peacefully demonstrate on the streets in Hungary had previously voted to give Hungarian citizenship to the ethnic Hungarians in the neighboring countries. Attila Juhász, the mayor of the town, said that he and his party (the Alliance of Vojvodina Hungarians), which is the most influential ethnic Hungarian party in Serbia, believe that Hungarians in Vojvodina have no business in the Hungarian events.

=== September 21 ===
==== Budapest ====
Peaceful demonstration went on, but people showed markedly less interest. The main opposition party, Fidesz has cancelled its planned rally previously announced for September 23, due to warnings of a possible attack. The demonstrators of Kossuth Square still lacked any serious political support. Police issued arrest warrants against several football ultras and other presumed troublemakers.

A leader of a right-wing extremist demonstrator group announced in a local cable TV that he would take full responsibility for any future violence but his group planned no more attacks against the media.)

The day and night were quiet overall, but arson was reported when a district office of the Hungarian Socialist Party was set ablaze in Újpest (a district of Budapest). It was quickly extinguished.

=== September 22 ===
==== Budapest ====
The day passed peacefully. The Kossuth Square demonstration carried on, with 10,000 demonstrators in the evening, and featured several speeches. The demonstration was very well supported with food and on-location made meals. The Parliament-outsider right-wing Hungarian Justice and Life Party held its peaceful, speech-oriented rally under heavy police presence. Police leaders announced that they will maintain their alert at the same level as that of the previous days.

Prime Minister Ferenc Gyurcsány made his official trip to Berlin, Germany today. He visited the X. International Bertelsmann Forum 2006 of the Bertelsmann Stiftung where he also met the German Chancellor Angela Merkel. After the meeting Gyurcsány claimed that Merkel found his leaked speech to be brave. Later the Chancellor's office denied even mentioning the word "brave".

==== Other cities ====
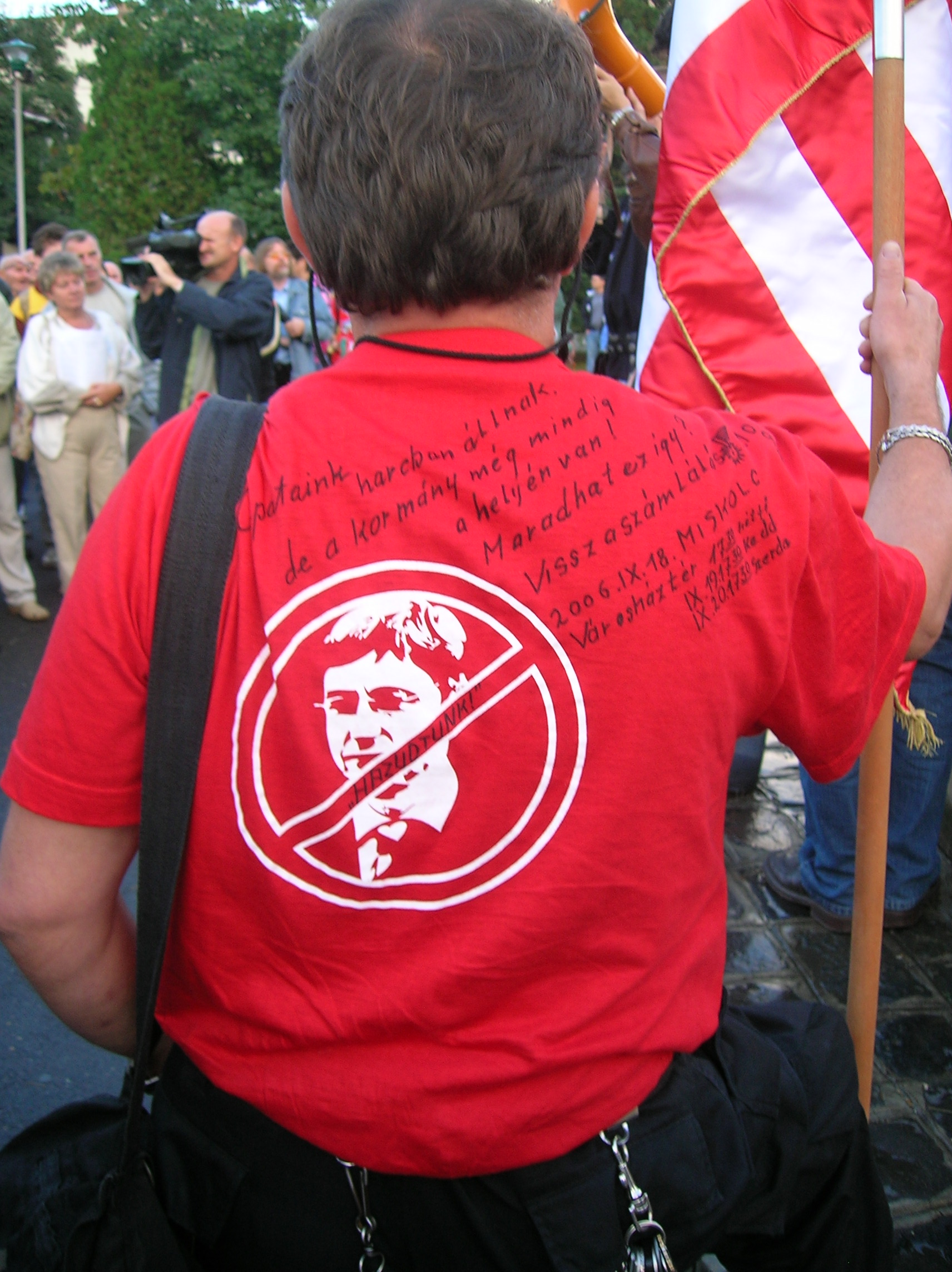
Demonstrator

In Miskolc demonstrations started on St. Stephen Square as usual, with fewer demonstrators than on previous days. The speaker informed demonstrators about the latest happenings countrywide, then exhorted people to demonstrate every evening at 18:00 on the main squares of cities until the government resigns. He also said that the fundraising to help those who are penalized for taking part in the demonstrations should be held in the whole country, not only in Miskolc. The speaker mentioned that police officers informed him on Thursday that he will be held responsible for any atrocities committed in the city by the demonstrators; because of this he organized a committee of five people who will protect the demonstrators from provocators, remove the demonstrators who try to stir up trouble, and will try to prevent attacks against police officers.

The demonstrators took their usual route – first to City Hall Square, to the city hall and then to the Alliance of Free Democrats party's county office, where a high school teacher gave a speech comparing Gyurcsány's speech to "the opening of Pandora's box", then marched through Széchenyi Street towards MSZP's office, and later to Petőfi Square. Only about 600 people took part in the demonstrations, which was planned to be very short this time, since the local football team, DVTK was playing against Vasas in the Diósgyőr district of the city and organizers didn't want football fans joining the demonstrators. The football match could also have been the reason for the low participation in the demonstration. Mentions were made about the demonstrations being continued on the weekend.

About 500 people were protesting in Debrecen, 500 in Szeged, 400 in Szécsény, 100–200 in Békéscsaba, 100–120 in Salgótarján, 50 in Nyíregyháza and smaller groups in several other towns.

==== Other countries ====
- Austria: News reported a demonstration of about 60 members of the Hungarian minority living in Austria at the embassy of Hungary in Vienna. After a speech, they handed over their petition to the embassy officials.
- Canada: Hungarians living in Toronto announced their intention to hold a peaceful demonstration before the Hungarian consulate in Toronto on September 23 afternoon.
- Switzerland: Swiss News Agency reported that Friday afternoon about 60 Hungarians living in Switzerland demonstrated before the embassy in Bern. They declared that Gyurcsány's government was not legitimate from a moral point of view any more.
- United States: More than 100 demonstrators demanded Gyurcsány's resignation before the Hungarian consulate in New York City. Some demonstrators travelled from New Jersey and Connecticut to take part in the demonstration. The Hungarian national anthem and Szózat were sung several times, and the revolutionary poem Nemzeti dal was recited. A demonstration was also held in Los Angeles.

=== September 23 ===
Between 20,000 and 50,000 people protested in Budapest.

=== September 24 ===
According to MTI (Official Hungarian News Agency) the peaceful demonstration on Kossuth square continued with participation of 10,000 to 12,000. Hungary's newspapers have mixed views.

=== September 25 ===
Magyar Lobbi ("Hungarian Lobby"), an organisation of American and European professors and scientists of Hungarian origin, wrote a petition to President László Sólyom, demanding that he start a no-confidence provision against the government.

Other associations and organisations (e.g. Új Magyarországért Egyesület, Védegylet) in their petitions given to the Civil Office of Parliament demanded starting a conventional assembly. One of these was written by Új Magyarországért Egyesület and signed by Farkas Bethlen, András Hargitay, András Kelemen, Imre Makovecz, Miklós Melocco, József V. Molnár, Lajos Papp, Imre Pozsgay, Mátyás Szűrös and László Tőkés.

Renovation of MTV hall started.

In the country and on Kossuth Square peaceful demonstrations continued, with about 300 participants in Miskolc, 400 in Szeged, 300 in Szekszárd, 4000 on Kossuth Square.

The protests also received international coverage – Jon Stewart referenced the audio recordings and the protests in The Daily Show, noting that "It must be nice to have a democracy so young and idealistic you can still be disappointed in it."

=== September 26 ===
In an open letter published in the maverick newspaper Magyar Nemzet, several public-life people, including former Chairman of the National Bank of Hungary Péter Ákos Bod, former president Ferenc Mádl and ex-minister János Martonyi called Ferenc Gyurcsány to resign. Demonstrations continued.

== Influences on the 2006 municipal elections ==
On October 1, 2006 municipal elections were held in Hungary. In many cities, demonstrators urged people not to vote for the MSZP candidate. In its campaign leaflets and phone calls, Fidesz constantly referred to Gyurcsány's lies.

In response, Gyurcsány insisted in a speech he held in Szeged on September 15 that the local elections would have no bearing on his party staying in power, and "those who don't want a war between the government and the city should know whom to vote for". (He was catcalled.)

Turnout in the local elections was 53.1%, which was two points higher than in 2002 and the highest for municipal elections since the return to democracy in 1990. Opposition parties booked a clear victory in the elections for county and Budapest assemblies and in the mayoral elections in cities with county rights.

However, the polling firm Median opined that the scandal around Gyurcsány's lying had not affected the outcome of the elections as much as it was expected to, as support for MSZP had already hit an all-time low by early September. Moreover, in Budapest, Gábor Demszky was re-elected city mayor as SZDSZ/MSZP candidate, and the MSzP retained a plurality of district mayoralties.

For fuller detail about the results of the October 2006 local elections, see Elections in Hungary.

== Post-election protests ==
Following the elections, demonstrations demanding the government's resignation continued in Budapest (every day until October 23) and in other cities (every week until winter).

== October 23 ==
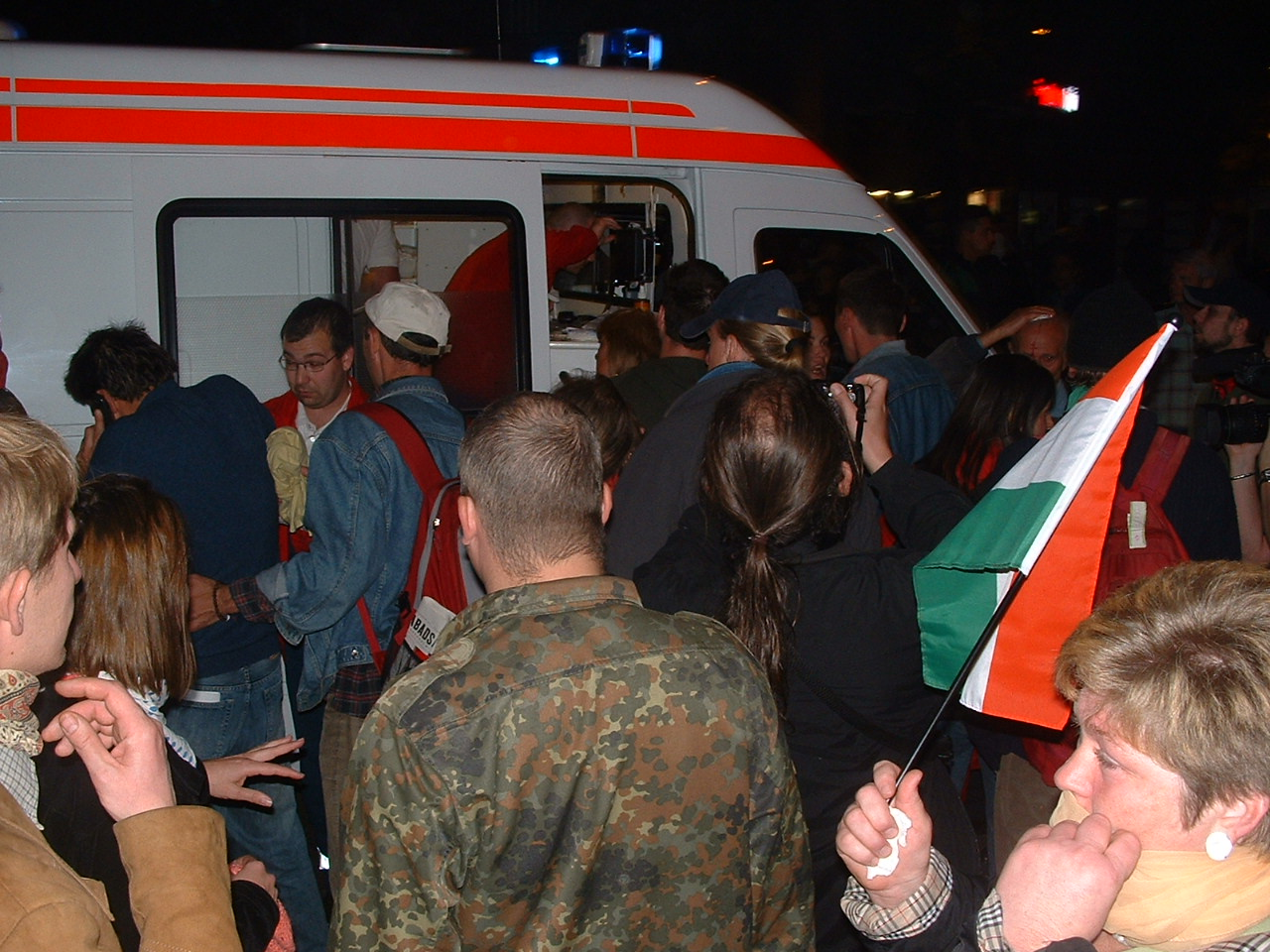
The photo was taken at Dohany Street at 6:00 PM. Paramedics give first aid to injured people.

On the 50th anniversary of the 1956 Hungarian Revolution, clashes between protesters and the police were reported. Mounted police charges, tear gas, rubber bullets, and water cannons were used to force back the crowd. Rubber bullets were frequently aimed head-high, causing a large number of injuries; a man lost the sight of one eye due to a rubber bullet.

Events started at 02:00, when Chief of the Budapest Police Force Péter Gergényi decided – in opposition to previous agreements with demonstrators – to clear out Kossuth Square . The official justification was that the demonstrators "obstructed security checking of the square". (This was not completely true: hundreds of protesters left the square "extemporary" to make it easier for the police. Only a grim group of 10–20 demonstrators led by Ferdinánd "Satu" Lanczer stayed there. They were rounded up by police.) Most of the crowd stopped at Nádor Street. Gergényi declared the area an "operational zone" and prohibited all demonstrations on the square and in its neighborhood "as long as necessary".

Budapest Mayor Gábor Demszky declared he was not informed about these police actions and "at first glance" did not agree with them.

Police say that no one was injured in this action, but MTI (the official Hungarian News Agency) reported "men with bloody heads". The peaceful demonstration ended for a while, with smaller (mainly verbal) incidents between police and protesters noted. The indignant crowd was not willing to end protesting; many of them wanted to go back when the security check was finished, but the police started to crowd them out. When this news spread, the crowd began to multiply.

Near St. Stephen's Basilica people started to muster again in the morning. Some of them made anti-government signs in English and wanted to take part in the official celebration on Kossuth Square with them, but policemen prohibited it. Finally, the crowd began to march into Corvin Street, because there they could hold a minor, preannounced (and therefore "legal") celebration. The crowd grew, so Hír TV (News Television) reported ten thousand protesters according to "non-official police sources." The crowd could not decide what to do. Most of them shouted "Kossuth Square" and "Let's go, let's go," and after the celebration started off. On Alkotmány Street they clashed with police forces, which made them retreat to the Cathedral. At about 15:00, police started to dissipate the crowd with tear gas. Protesters acquired an unarmed T-34 tank (a part of the occasional local open-air exhibition) and used it in a charge. After only a few hundred meters the tank driver decided to stop, as he feared he would run over protesters. Its driver (said to be a veteran of 1956) was arrested, no serious damage was done.

At Astoria a peaceful celebration of Fidesz started. Despite their readiness (during the previous few days, hundreds of policemen were called in from the country to the city), police did little to defend the crush of radical anti-government protests that took place only 300–500 metres away and pressed nearer and nearer by police's gas attacks in the wide Erzsébet Boulevard. That night and the next day many political analysts and congressmen brought up the idea that this police behaviour was not by chance. Fidesz celebration, with a participation of thousands, ended at 18:00. That crowd could not be disbanded at all when police started a horse assault on Deák Square protesters. They used gun shells too.

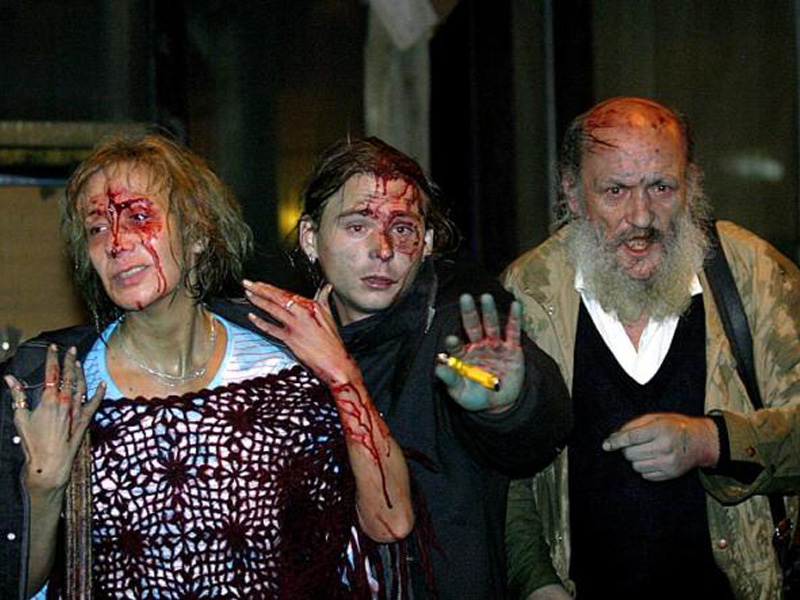
Victims of the Hungarian Police's actions on 23 October 2006

Vandalism was reported on the side of protesters and police alike. Some vandals broke shop windows while many other protesters tried to prevent them. But evidences show that appearance of police was unprecedentedly brutal and disproportionate to the protest. The police shot gas grenades and rubber bullets in at head-height and didn't sort peaceful celebrants from protesters and provocateurs. Many peaceful passers-by were injured. The fact that police suddenly reduced public transport in many places and directly and indirectly detained celebrators from getting to monuments and protesters from escaping from hot places added to the growing chaos. There are lot of videos showing policemen, after tackling a demonstrator, kicking him. A detachment of policemen entered a bar on the Blaha Lujza Square, dragged out several customers on the street and subdued them violently, which included breaking the fingers of a handcuffed man, and shooting one in the back with a shot of rubber pellets point-blank. Policemen in most of the restaurants and pubs drove in guests (referring to safety risks) or drove them out (referring to that they search for radical demonstrators) and they used foul language. They mistreated not only demonstrators, but bypassers, ambulancemen, foreign tourists, and reporters. Even Parliamentarian Máriusz Révész was shot and beaten when he, showing his MP clearance in his hand, tried to protect their celebration from attacking police forces. They ill-treated Jesuit priest László Vértesaljai., as well as two other priests.

The crowd escaped in the direction of the Danube River. In Ferenciek Square and on a bridge over the Danube they built barricades from everything they found (including building operations materials, signposts, iron police cordon elements, cars and buses). The number of injured people grew. Police broke the barricade on the bridge using a snow plow. The riots ended at dawn.

128 people were reported injured, 19 of whom were policemen. At least two men were reported blinded in one eye from the rubber bullets.

In the country (e.g. in Szombathely), demonstrations started against "police terror".

== November 4 and the end of the protests ==
On November 1, main opposition party Fidesz announced their plans to stage several large-scale demonstrations across Hungary on the anniversary of the Soviet suppression of the 1956 Revolution. The events were intended to serve be a memorial to the victims of the Soviet invasion and a protest against police brutality during the October 23 unrest in Budapest. There was a candlelight vigil march across Budapest on the 4th of November. Eventually the demonstrations petered out by the end of the year. The new round of demonstrations expected in the Spring of 2007 did not materialize.

== Aftermath ==
The official report on the demonstrations and the attacks on non-violent civilians came out in February 2007. The panel of experts, appointed by Prime Minister Ferenc Gyurcsány, published a 263-page report on the riots which concluded that they were triggered in part by uncertainty about state reforms and exacerbated by the opposition party Fidesz's call for Gyurcsány to resign which represented an attempt to "overthrow" the government and "jeopardized parliamentary democracy." The commission further said that the use of force by the police was justified, but officers acted too aggressively. The commission recommended that (1) no amnesty be given to those serving sentences for violence during the riots, that (2) police be banned from using bullets to disperse crowds, that (3) only specially trained police be used for crowd control, and that (4) a 1989 law banning public gatherings near parliament and demonstrations lasting more than 24 hours be reinstated. A spokesman for Fidesz said the commission was biased in favor of the government.

On 20 May 2007, Prime Minister Gyurcsány announced the resignations of Justice Minister József Petrétei, National Police Chief László Bene and Budapest Police Chief Péter Gergényi. Gyurcsány said the move is intended to restore public confidence in Hungary's police and justice systems. News stories attribute the move to recent police scandals and the cloud cast by the disproportionate use of force during the 2006 anti-government demonstrations.

The protests were the beginning of the end for the MSZP government. It was heavily defeated by the Fidesz opposition at the 2010 election, which paved the way for the Orbán era in Hungary.

== See also ==
- Őszöd speech
- Ferenc Gyurcsány
- Elk*rtuk
