= Balatonőszöd =

- Village
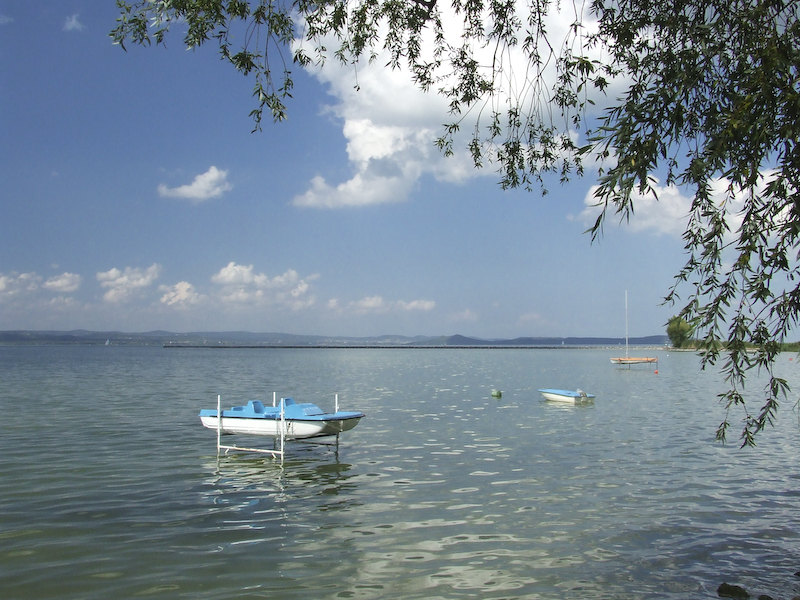
- Lake Balaton in Balatonőszöd

- Location of Balatonőszöd
- Coordinates: 46.80667°N 17.80176°E
- Country: Hungary
- Region: Southern Transdanubia
- County: Somogy
- District: Siófok
- RC Diocese: Kaposvár

Area
  - Total: 15.08 km^{2} (5.82 sq mi)

Population (2017)
  - Total: 491
  - Density: 32.6/km^{2} (84.3/sq mi)
- Demonym(s): őszödi, balatonőszödi
- Time zone: UTC+1 (CET)
  - Summer (DST): UTC+2 (CEST)
- Postal code: 8637
- Area code: (+36) 84
- Motorways: M7
- Distance from Budapest: 132 km (82 mi) Northeast
- NUTS 3 code: HU232
- MP: Mihály Witzmann (Fidesz)
- Website: Balatonőszöd Online

Balatonőszöd is a village in Somogy county, Hungary, located on the shores of Lake Balaton.

It is notable primarily for the speech that Hungarian Prime Minister Ferenc Gyurcsány delivered to members of the Hungarian Socialist Party (MSZP) in 2006.

The settlement is part of the Balatonboglár wine region.
