= The Fighting City =

Art project by the Hungarian art group Inconnu

The Fighting City (in Hungarian: Harcoló város) was an international art project launched by the Hungarian Inconnu Group in 1986.

The occasion for the art competition, announced in the August 14 issue of The New York Review of Books, was to commemorate the 30th anniversary of the 1956 revolution in Hungary and was sponsored by Timothy Garton Ash, Danilo Kis, George Konrad, and Susan Sontag. The artworks were meant to be exhibited and then auctioned to raise funds for the illegally working civil organization Foundation for the Poor (SZETA).

The authorities, mandated by the regime to suppress the memory and even the mention of the revolution, did everything to make the exhibition impossible: they threatened the members of Inconnu and made sure that the mailed art pieces never reach their destination. For instance, the works of Joseph Dobay, Jo Siddens, and Iris Stocubridge are known to have disappeared.

In December 1986, some of the artworks sent in to the competition were lost to the Hungarian police when they raided the flat of Jenő Nagy, a samizdat publisher.

Finally, on January 28, 1987, just a few hours before the opening of the exhibition, the police raided the downtown home-turned-gallery and confiscated the 39 items of the show. Nevertheless, the opening was held, speeches were delivered and instead of art, the public could see on the walls the minutes of the raid and the receipts for the pieces taken away.

The authorities later decided that the objects did not meet the standards of public taste in terms of design and material, had no financial value therefore cannot be put on the market, and shredded them. Ironically, before shredding the works, the police photographed each of them and archived the set of photographs, thus themselves created a full copy of the exhibition they destroyed.

What other remains from this banned and annihilated exhibition are the catalogs and a voice recording of an Inconnu member reading the names of the exhibiting artists – including Mária Antalffy, Péter Bokros, Attila Dócs, Glenn Helm, Ágnes Háy, Jessica Douglas, Jo Siddens, Judith Roberts, Csaba Kiss, Tamás Molnár, Gáspár Nagy, Norman Rubington, Niki van Osten, Sophie Rivera, Imre Szőke, Zsigmond Vörös – from Hungary, Britain, the US, the Netherlands, and Yugoslavia, the titles of the works as well as the auction put-up price.

== Bibliography ==
- Sümegi, György (2011). "Egy kiállítás utolsó felvonása" (PDF). Betekintő. 2011/2.
- Peter Bokros, Tomas Molnar Lajos, Robert Palinkas Patak, Sandor Szilagyi Danko, Jenoe Nagy Kalaszi (December 4, 1986). "Announcement". The New York Review.
- "'The Fighting City'". The New York Review. May 7, 1987.
