= Őszöd speech =

2006 speech by Hungarian Prime Minister Ferenc Gyurcsány

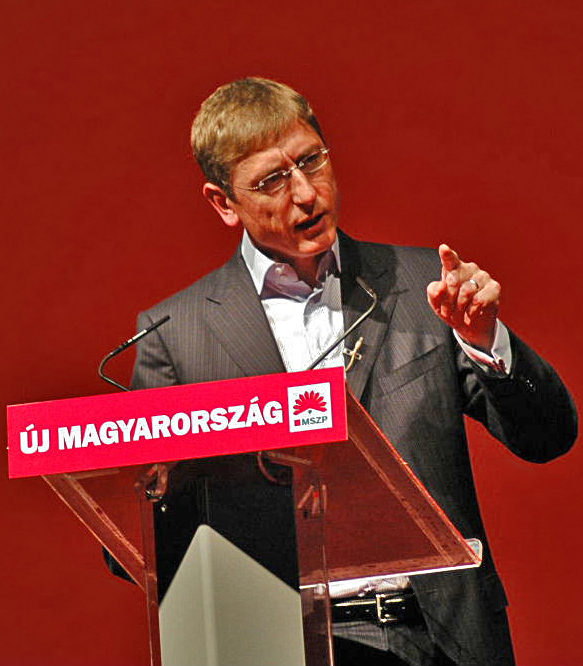
- Gyurcsány speaking at a party congress on 2 September 2006, 15 days before the Őszöd speech was leaked
- Date: 26 May 2006
- Duration: 27 minutes
- Location: Balatonőszöd, Hungary
- Type: Speech

The Őszöd speech (Hungarian: Őszödi beszéd) was a speech Hungarian Prime Minister Ferenc Gyurcsány delivered to the 2006 Hungarian Socialist Party (MSZP) congress in Balatonőszöd. Though the May congress was confidential, Gyurcsány's address was leaked and broadcast by Magyar Rádió on Sunday, 17 September 2006, igniting a nationwide political crisis.

In the speech, Gyurcsány berated MSZP in vulgar language, saying that the party had misled the electorate and failed to enact any significant measures over the tenure of its coalition government. "We lied in the morning, we lied in the evening and we lied at night" became one of the most well known parts of Gyurcsány's speech. The speech's release was followed by mass protests, which are now considered a major turning point in Hungary's post-Communist political history. The corresponding fallout led to a collapse in the popularity of MSZP and the Hungarian left more broadly.

It proved to be the beginning of the end for the two-term MSZP-led government, paving the way for Fidesz's supermajority victory in the 2010 Hungarian parliamentary election, and its subsequent 16-year reign over the country.

== Excerpts from the speech with their translations ==
=== Profane excerpts ===
Not only the content but also the profanity of the speech has been heavily criticized. In response to the criticism concerning the profanity, Ferenc Gyurcsány stated that "these words were the words of objurgation, passion and love" (Ezek a korholás, a szenvedély és a szeretet szavai voltak). While giving the speech, he used – among others – the Hungarian word szar (i.e., shit) or related terms (szarból, beszarni, etc.) eight times and the word kurva (i.e., bitch, whorish, fucking) seven times. The following table presents some of the profane remarks – of which not everything has been translated by the foreign (i.e., non-Hungarian) press in general – with their corresponding translations. Although "fucking country" is the best idiomatic translation because of the strength of the words, kurva ország literally means "whore country", and the connotations of immorality, unprincipled pursuit of money, and therefore corruption are very strong in Hungarian.

in English	in Hungarian
"My personal story is: we must change this fucking country; otherwise who else will?" (see note above about "fucking country")	"Az a személyes sztorim, hogy változtassuk meg ezt a kurva országot; mert ki fogja megváltoztatni?"
"Fuck that. Let's move on." Note that the original Hungarian phrase is much stronger language than this and corresponds roughly in meaning to "to the cunt".	"Húzzatok már a picsába ezzel. Gyerünk előre."
"There aren't many choices. That is because we have fucked it up. Not just a bit, but a lot."	"Nincsen sok választás. Azért nincsen, mert elkúrtuk. Nem kicsit; nagyon."
"That it [i.e., the Left] doesn't have to hang its head in this fucking country. That we shouldn't shit ourselves in fear of Viktor Orbán and the Right, and learn finally to compare itself [i.e., the Left] not to them but to the world." (see note above about 'fucking country')	"Hogy nem kell lehajtani a fejét [t.i., a baloldalnak] ebben a kurva országban. Hogy nem kell beszarni Orbán Viktortól, meg a jobboldaltól és tanulja most már meg magát [t.i., a baloldalnak] nem ő hozzájuk mérni, hanem a világhoz."
"Will we say, that fu… goddamn it all, a few people came along who dared to do it and didn't shit around with things like how the hell will we get our travel costs refunded; for fuck's sake! A few people came along and didn't give a shit about whether there will be a place for them in local governments or not, but they understood that this fucking country is about something else." (see note above about 'fucking country')	"Azt mondjuk-e, hogy: a kur… a rohadt életbe, jöttek páran, akik meg merték tenni és nem szarakodtak azon, hogy hogy a francban lesz majd az útiköltség elszámolásunk; bassza meg! Jöttek páran, akik nem szarakodtak azon, hogy a megyei önkormányzatban lesz-e majd helyük, vagy nem, hanem megértették, hogy másról szól ez a kurva ország."
"And of course we can think for a very long time and conduct a whole fucking load of analysis about how certain social groups will end up; this is what I can say to you."	"És persze még gondolkodhatunk nagyon sokáig, meg kibaszott sok elemzést el lehet végezni, hogy melyik társadalmi csoportot hogy fogja végezni; azt tudom nektek mondani."
"And I will write fucking good books about the modern Hungarian left."	"És írok majd kibaszott jó könyveket a modern magyar baloldalról."
"... that I make history. Not for the history textbooks; I don't give a shit about that."	"... hogy történelmet csinálok. Nem a történelemkönyveknek; arra szarok."
"You cannot name any significant government measures that we can be proud of except pulling our administration out of the shit at the end. Nothing!"	"Nem tudtok mondani olyan jelentős kormányzati intézkedést, amire büszkék lehetünk, azon túl, hogy a szarból visszahoztuk a kormányzást a végére. Semmit!"
"Has the healthcare system improved, my son? I reply: that's a load of bullshit, mom! They just recognise your name."	"Megjavult az egészségügyi rendszer, fiam? Mondom: egy lószart, mama! Csak felismerik a nevedet."
"What if we didn't lose our popularity because we are fucking about among ourselves but because we dealt with great social issues? And then it wouldn't matter if we temporarily lose the support of the public; we will win it back again afterwards."	"Mi lenne, hogy ha nem az egymás közötti faszkodás miatt veszítenénk el a népszerűségünket, hanem mert csinálunk nagy társadalmi ügyeket, és nem probléma, hogy elveszítjük akkor egy időre a támogatásunkat; aztán majd visszaszerezzük."

=== Other excerpts ===
In addition to the excerpts above, the following table contains excerpts from the speech for which Ferenc Gyurcsány has received heavy criticism.

in English	in Hungarian
"Divine providence, the abundance of cash in the world economy, and hundreds of tricks, which you obviously don't need to know about, helped us survive this situation."	"Az isteni gondviselés, a világgazdaság pénzbősége, meg trükkök százai, amiről nyilvánvalóan nektek nem kell tudni, segítette, hogy ezt túléljük."
"Let them protest in front of Parliament. Sooner or later they will get bored of it and go home."	"Lehet tüntetni a Parlament előtt. Előbb-utóbb megunják, hazamennek."
"If there is a scandal in the society, then it's the fact that the upper ten thousand are building themselves up again using public money."	"Ha van társadalmi botrány, akkor az, hogy a felső tízezer termeli magát újra közpénzen."
"And we should try to take these issues forward, to maintain the cooperation and good will between us, to assure the support of the coalition partner [i.e., SZDSZ], to prepare the managers and leading publicists of the most influential newspapers about what they can count on. To involve them in this process."	"És egyszerre kell megpróbálni előre vinni ezeket az ügyeket, fenntartani közöttünk az együttműködést, a jóhiszeműséget, biztosítani a koalíciós partner [t.i., SZDSZ] támogatását, fölkészíteni a legbefolyásosabb lapok vezetőit, és vezető publicistáit, hogy mire számíthatnak. Bevonni őket ebbe a folyamatba."
"No European country has done something as boneheaded as we have. Obviously, we lied throughout the last year-and-a-half, two years."	"Európában ilyen böszmeséget még ország nem csinált, mint amit mi csináltunk. Nyilvánvalóan végighazudtuk az utolsó másfél, két évet."
"And meanwhile, by the way, we've done nothing for four years. Nothing."	"És közben egyébként nem csináltunk semmit négy évig. Semmit"
"I almost perished because I had to pretend for 18 months that we were governing. Instead, we lied morning, night, and evening."	"Majdnem beledöglöttem, hogy másfél évig úgy kellett tenni, mintha kormányoztunk volna. Ehelyett hazudtunk reggel, éjjel, meg este."
"There are several matters, where I have no clue what the sixth step is; I don't even know the third. I know the first two."	"Hogy egy sor ügyben fogalmam sincsen, hogy melyik a, nem a hatodik lépés; még a harmadikat sem tudom. Tudom az első kettőt."

== Reactions ==
Viktor Orbán, then-chairman of Fidesz, called Ferenc Gyurcsány "a compulsive liar" (Hungarian: "beteges hazudozó") whom his party considers as "a person who is a part of history and the past" (Hungarian: "a történelemhez és a múlthoz tartozó személy").

== See also ==
- 2006 protests in Hungary
- Elk*rtuk
- Ferenc Gyurcsány
- Video about production of Mykhailo Dobkin's campaign ad, a leak of a vulgar conversation that had the opposite effect
- Nixon White House tapes
