= Elk*rtuk =

- Promotional poster
- Directed by: Keith English
- Written by: Balázs Bende
- Produced by: Gábor Kálomista; Dorottya Helmeczy
- Starring: Vivianne Bánovits; András Mózes; Barna Bokor; Szabolcs Bede-Fazekas; Gabi Gubás
- Cinematography: Josep M. Civit
- Edited by: László Rumbold
- Music by: Viktor Rakonczai
- Distributed by: Megafilm Kft.
- Release date: 21 October 2021 (Hungary)
- Running time: 127 minutes
- Country: Hungary
- Language: Hungarian
- Budget: 1.143 billion HUF ($3.667 million USD)
- Box office: $202,300 USD

Elk*rtuk (lit: "We f*cked up", working title: "A hazugság ára" (lit: "The Price of Lies"), English: The Cost of Deception, stylized as ELKXRTUK) is a 2021 Hungarian political drama action thriller film, centered around the 2006 Öszöd speech made by former Hungarian Prime Minister Ferenc Gyurcsány (the title being a literal excerpt of one of the most infamous lines of the speech), the leaking of said speech, and its subsequent consequences. It was directed by Keith English.

The film was released in Hungary on 21 October 2021. Due to the release's proximity to the 2022 Hungarian parliamentary election, and its negative portrayal of currently present figures of the opposition parties, especially the aforementioned former Prime Minister and current leader of the Democratic Coalition, as well as his wife, Klára Dobrev, and opposition-supported Budapest mayor Gergely Karácsony, the film became highly controversial and was accused of being propaganda for the governing party, Fidesz, by Hungarian news outlets.

== Plot ==
When Réka finds out her boss is involved in the leaking of a scandalous Prime Minister speech, she decides to investigate the case to gain a position among the big-shots. She teams up with her journalist boyfriend and starts investigating, but soon gets confronted by her boss and they become hunted by the secret services. So when she finds answers about the police terror and secrets of the 2006 scandal of the Prime Minister, it's not only her career that is in danger anymore, but her life.

== Production ==
The movie was largely produced in secrecy.

Public databases list the beginning of the movie's production, then under the working title "A hazugság ára", as 16 November 2020, with shooting then expected to begin on 21 March 2021. Casting for the movie, then described as "a movie about an ambitious, yet suppressed opinion poller, who discovers that their boss had a hand in leaking a scandalous voice recording", began in February 2021. At that point, it was unconfirmed that the voice recording in question was, in fact, the Öszöd speech, although rumours, and actors claiming to be contacted by the casting agency and asking for anonymity, claimed that was the case. Shoots for the movie have certainly gone underway by 11 April, when 168 Óra noted a contemporary water cannon, and a burnt out car, in front of the former headquarters of Hungarian Television, one of the most infamous locations of the 2006 protests against the contemporary government. The financing and budget of the movie is also uncertain. In an interview with the BBC, producer Gábor Kálomista "denied receiving public money for the film, but declined to list the names of his financial backers." In the aforementioned public database, the total budget of the movie was initially listed as 800 million Hungarian forints, then on 9 July 2021, the budget increased to roughly 1.143 billion forints, of which approximately 343 million came from indirect financial support from the government, in the form of corporate tax cuts.

== Release ==
Elk*rtuk was released on 21 October 2021, with its premiere being in Budapest. It premiered internationally in Brussels on 9 November, before going into international distribution. There are also "ongoing talks with the two largest streaming services" about the release of the film.

The movie's producer, Gábor Kálomista, complained about cinemas "censoring" the movie and not responding to requests to screen it in the case of the Cinema City movie theater chain, or only screening it in one location in the case of Budapest Film, and accused Budapest's mayor, Gergely Karácsony, of hindering the distribution of the movie. Gergely Karácsony noted that the mayor can not decide whether or not a given movie is played in theatres, only the companies operating them may make that decision, and he would feel ashamed if he had to order cinemas to screen or not to screen certain movies. Cinema City denied the accusations, claiming they agreed to screen the movie a week before the accusations were made, while Budapest Film claimed that they operate mostly small cinemas, which only screen art films, a classification Elk*rtuk did not have at the time; therefore, they would screen the movie in the largest movie theater they own, Corvin, which also screens commercial films. Subsequently, the National Film Office (a branch of the Cabinet Office of the Prime Minister) classified Elk*rtuk as an art film.

After the premiere, numerous free screenings of the movie were held in rural community centres, often supported by local officials who were part of Fidesz. One MP who's a member of Fidesz, László Vécsey, offered to transport those participating in the government-friendly "Békemenet" ("March of Peace") on 23 October by bus, for free, to be able to take them to a free screening of Elk*rtuk in Kistarcsa. In Karcag, students of local high schools were offered free bus rides to two free screenings of the movie in the local cultural centre, which is owned by the local government. It is unclear who paid for the equipment (as the establishment has no equipment of its own which would be required to screen a movie, a local contractor brought the necessary material on-site), or the transport of the students, although numerous teachers have claimed that the local government covered said expenses. The mayor of Karcag, László Dobos, is supported by the governing Fidesz-KDNP coalition.

== Reception ==
=== Box office ===
As of 4 November 2021, Elk*rtuk has grossed a total of $202,300 during its Hungarian theatrical run. It debuted third on its opening weekend in Hungary, after Dune and Venom: Let There Be Carnage. In an interview, producer Gábor Kálomista claimed Elk*rtuk had the "strongest opening of any film in Hungary since the beginning of the COVID-19 pandemic" and had a "viewership which is closing in on 100,000 people", although the aforementioned box office data and free screenings of the movie in non-cinema locations cast doubt on said claims' legitimacy.

=== Critical reception and controversies ===
The movie has been highly controversial even prior to the movie's release, due to its discussion of contemporary political events and figures, and allegedly painting several members of opposition parties in a negative light. Telex.hu's Attila Tóth-Szenesi pointed out that "making a movie about the events is completely normal and only unusual in Hungary", citing All the President's Men as an example. He also noted that the depictions of the subsequent protests and their violent suppression were not overexaggerated, although the events of the movie end before the peak of the protests at 23 October. However, he also noted that the former Prime Minister is not played by any member of the cast, and is at most present on television screens; and in his opinion, the movie is actually not about a journalist and a marketing agent either, as the promotions claimed, but is rather centered around Klára Dobrev's and György Szilvásy's "unbelievable, and in many cases, completely baseless rampage", claiming the former's role in the events was "laughably overblown". In light of this, he also claimed that, considering the 2021 Hungarian opposition primary (in which Klára Dobrev was a candidate), and the upcoming parliamentary election, the film meets the definition of propaganda.

Several media outlets which are part of the Central European Press and Media Foundation with close ties to the current government reviewed the movie positively, pointing out the aforementioned normalcy of depicting contemporary political events in films in other countries, and claiming "a very thought-provoking film was born in a genre which can also be enjoyed by younger people". However, other news outlets pointed out that an initial review on Magyar Nemzet has been copied verbatim by these outlets, with even the titles left unchanged, all of the titles being "Elk*rtuk became a fast-paced and exciting political crime thriller".

The movie has been subject to excessive review-bombing on IMDb. The film is one of the lowest-rated movies on the site despite receiving astroturfed positive reviews, with Fidesz-supporting Facebook pages encouraging people to rate the movie positively. Sudden spikes of votes, making the total amount of them double or triple within an hour, have been observed multiple times between 21 and 25 October. The weighted average rating of the movie, as of 18:21 UTC, 27 February 2023, is 1.5/10, with around 39,000 ratings, of which over 96% are either 1/10 or 10/10.

=== Potential sequel ===
In an interview on 3 November, producer Gábor Kálomista has claimed that, due to the "gigantic success" of the film, he sees the potential for a sequel.
