= Inconnu Independent Art Group =

Hungarian organization

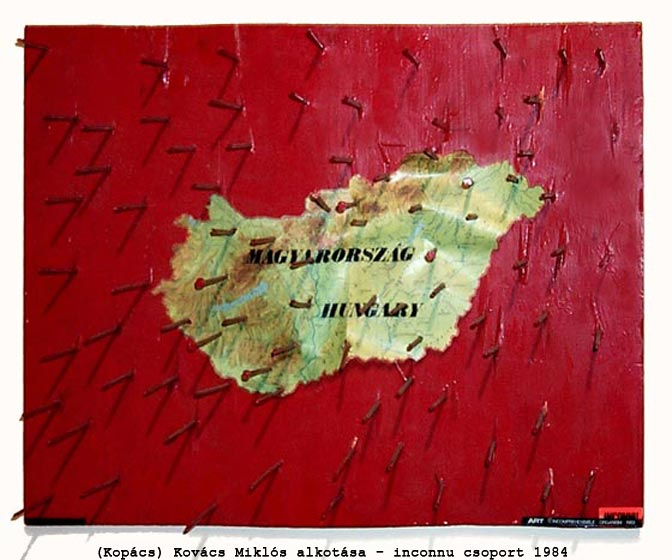
Artwork by Kopács Kovács Miklós from 1984

Inconnu Art Group (later the Inconnu Independent Art Group) is a Hungarian group of maverick fine artists from the communist and postcommunist eras. The original members were Bokros Péter, Molnár Tamás, Csécsei Mihály, Mészáros Bánk, Letenyei József, Sipos Mihály, Kopács Kovács Miklós, and Morva Ibolya. The foundation date of the group is unknown, but as Péter Bokros remembers (in 2005), they started their common activities in 1978, Cegléd, but the name "inconnu" came later.

They took part in (often illegal) exhibitions and performances in the eighties; and were considered as an important part of the Hungarian democratic opposition both in Hungary and abroad. From 1979, they were subject to serious manhunt by the Hungarian authorities, and they were continuously followed and eyed by secret agents.

In 1986, the materials of their exhibition The Fighting City was confiscated and destroyed by the police. The artworks, ironically, are only known from the photos taken by the police before shredding them.

In 2019, the history of the Inconnu Group was critically analyzed by the Left Turn, Right Turn. Artistic and Political Radicalism of late Socialism in Hungary - The Orfeo and the Inconnu Groups exhibition at the Blinken Open Society Archives of Budapest. In 2021 under the same title an extensive comparative article was published that iquires the social biographies of the Inconnu members.

== Post-communism ==
After 1994, some members became active again and continued – in their words – their "anti-communist" drive, now against the (post-communist socialist) governments (led by Hungarian Socialist Party, MSzP). Other members created independent art and to explore the "rubberized horror of global powers".
