= Blackstreet discography =

- Studio albums: 4
- Compilation albums: 2
- Singles: 23
- Music videos: 16

This is a discography documenting albums and singles released by American R&B group Blackstreet.

== Albums ==
=== Studio albums ===
List of studio albums, with selected chart positions and certifications
| Title | Details | Peak chart positions | | | | | | | | | | Certifications |
| Title | Details | US | US R&B | AUS | CAN | FRA | GER | NLD | NZ | SWI | UK | Certifications |
|---|---|---|---|---|---|---|---|---|---|---|---|---|
| Blackstreet | Released: June 21, 1994; Label: Interscope; Formats: CD, LP, cassette, digital download | 52 | 7 | — | — | — | — | — | — | — | 35 | RIAA: Platinum; BPI: Silver |
| Another Level | Released: September 9, 1996; Label: Interscope; Formats: CD, LP, cassette, digital download | 3 | 1 | 37 | 18 | 39 | 47 | 20 | 32 | 19 | 26 | RIAA: 4× Platinum; BPI: Gold; MC: 2× Platinum; SNEP: Gold |
| Finally | Released: March 23, 1999; Label: Interscope; Formats: CD, LP, cassette, digital download | 9 | 4 | 25 | 14 | 33 | 34 | 21 | — | 34 | 27 | RIAA: Gold; MC: Gold |
| Level II | Released: March 11, 2003; Label: DreamWorks; Formats: CD, LP, cassette, digital download | 14 | 4 | — | — | 136 | — | — | — | — | 106 | |
"—" denotes a recording that did not chart or was not released in that territory.

=== Compilation albums ===
List of compilation albums, with selected chart positions
| Title | Details | Peak chart positions |
| Title | Details | US R&B |
|---|---|---|
| No Diggity: The Very Best of Blackstreet | Released: June 10, 2003; Label: Interscope; Formats: CD, LP, cassette, digital download | — |
| 20th Century Masters – Millennium Collection: The Best of Blackstreet | Released: July 27, 2004; Label: Interscope; Formats: CD, LP, cassette, digital download | 75 |
"—" denotes a recording that did not chart or was not released in that territory.

== Singles ==
=== As lead artist ===
List of singles as lead artist, with selected chart positions and certifications, showing year released and album name
| Title | Year | Peak chart positions | | | | | | | | | | Certifications | Album |
| Title | Year | US | US R&B | AUS | FRA | GER | NLD | NZ | SWE | SWI | UK | Certifications | Album |
|---|---|---|---|---|---|---|---|---|---|---|---|---|---|
| "Baby Be Mine" | 1993 | 1 | 17 | — | — | — | — | 50 | — | — | 37 | | CB4 (Original Motion Picture Soundtrack) and Blackstreet |
| "Booti Call" | 1994 | 34 | 14 | — | — | — | — | 40 | — | — | 56 | | Blackstreet |
| "Before I Let You Go" | 1994 | 7 | 2 | — | — | — | — | — | — | — | — | | Blackstreet |
| "Tonight's the Night" | 1995 | 80 | 27 | — | — | — | — | — | — | — | — | | Blackstreet |
| "Joy" | 1995 | 43 | 12 | — | — | — | — | 43 | — | — | 56 | | Blackstreet |
| "U Blow My Mind" | 1995 | — | — | — | — | — | — | — | — | — | 39 | | Blackstreet |
| "No Diggity" (featuring Dr. Dre and Queen Pen) | 1996 | 1 | 1 | 21 | 25 | 14 | 7 | 1 | 3 | 11 | 9 | RIAA: Platinum; ARIA: Gold; BPI: 4× Platinum; IFPI SWE: Gold; RMNZ: 5× Platinum | Another Level |
| "Never Gonna Let You Go" | 1997 | — | — | — | — | — | 63 | — | — | — | — | | Another Level |
| "Don't Leave Me" | 1997 | — | — | 12 | 19 | 23 | 20 | 1 | 33 | 27 | 6 | RMNZ: Gold; BPI: Silver | Another Level |
| "Fix" (featuring Ol' Dirty Bastard, Slash and Fishbone) | 1997 | 58 | 17 | 69 | 40 | 67 | 15 | 9 | 43 | — | 7 | | Another Level |
| "(Money Can't) Buy Me Love" | 1997 | — | — | — | — | — | 79 | 20 | — | — | 18 | | Another Level |
| "I Can't Get You (Out of My Mind)" (featuring Lamenga Kafi and Beverly Crowder) | 1998 | — | — | — | — | — | — | — | — | — | — | | Another Level |
| "Take Me There" (with Mýa featuring Mase and Blinky Blink) | 1998 | 14 | 10 | — | — | 58 | 22 | 1 | — | — | 7 | RMNZ: Platinum | The Rugrats Movie: Music from the Motion Picture and Finally |
| "Girlfriend/Boyfriend" (with Janet Jackson featuring Ja Rule and Eve) | 1999 | 47 | 17 | 16 | 71 | 98 | 41 | 12 | 59 | — | 11 | | Finally |
| "Yo Love" | 1999 | — | — | — | — | — | — | — | — | — | — | | Finally |
| "Think About You" | 1999 | — | 51 | — | — | — | — | — | — | — | — | | Finally |
| "Deep" | 2002 | — | — (Note: "Deep" did not enter the Hot R&B/Hip-Hop Songs chart, but peaked at number eight on the Bubbling Under R&B/Hip-Hop Songs chart.) | — | — | — | — | — | — | — | — | | Level II |
| "Wizzy Wow" (featuring Mystikal) | 2002 | — | 51 | — | — | — | — | — | — | — | 37 | | Level II |
| "Billie Jean" | 2003 | — | — | — | — | — | — | — | — | — | — | | No Diggity: The Very Best of Blackstreet |
"—" denotes a recording that did not chart or was not released in that territory.

=== As featured artist ===
List of singles as featured artist, with selected chart positions and certifications, showing year released and album name
| Title | Year | Peak chart positions | | | | | | | | | | Certifications | Album |
| Title | Year | US | US R&B | AUS | FRA | GER | NLD | NZ | SWE | SWI | UK | Certifications | Album |
|---|---|---|---|---|---|---|---|---|---|---|---|---|---|
| "Get Me Home" (Foxy Brown featuring Blackstreet) | 1997 | — | — | 60 | 44 | — | 15 | 8 | — | — | 11 | RMNZ: Gold | Ill Na Na |
| "The City Is Mine" (Jay-Z featuring Blackstreet) | 1998 | 52 | 37 | — | — | 28 | 51 | 19 | — | — | 38 | | In My Lifetime, Vol. 1 |
| "I Get Lonely" (remix) (Janet Jackson featuring Blackstreet) | 1998 | 3 | 1 | 21 | 72 | 75 | 20 | 6 | 50 | 41 | 5 | RIAA: Gold | The Velvet Rope |
| "Get Ready" (Mase featuring Blackstreet) | 1999 | — (Note: "Get Ready" did not enter the Billboard Hot 100, but peaked at number 25 on the Bubbling Under Hot 100 Singles chart.) | 50 | 23 | — | 86 | 41 | 10 | — | — | 32 | | Double Up |
"—" denotes a recording that did not chart or was not released in that territory.

== Soundtracks ==
- CB4
- Panther
- Soul Food
- Hav Plenty
- The Rugrats Movie
- Wild Wild West
- The Wood
- Steel

== Music videos ==
List of music videos, showing year released and directors
| Title | Year | Director(s) |
|---|---|---|
| "Baby Be Mine" (original version) | 1993 | Nelson George |
| "Baby Be Mine Remix" | 1994 | Dwayne Coles |
| "Before I Let You Go" | 1994 | Okuwah |
| "Tonight's the Night" | 1994 | Hype Williams |
| "I Like the Way You Work" | 1994 | Brett Ratner |
| "Joy" | 1995 | Okuwah |
| "No Diggity" | 1996 | Hype Williams |
| "Don't Leave Me" | 1996 | Michael Martin |
| "(Money Can't) Buy Me Love" | 1996 | Christopher Erskin |
| "Fix" | 1997 | Paul Hunter |
| "I Can Get You (Out of My Mind)" | 1997 | Teddy Riley |
| "Take Me There" | 1998 | Luke Nola and Steve Saussey |
| "Girlfriend/Boyfriend" | 1999 | Joseph Kahn |
| "Think About You" | 2000 | Malik Sayeed |
| "Deep" | 2002 | ULF and Teddy Riley |
| "Wizzy Wow" | 2002 | ULF |
