= No Diggity: The Very Best of Blackstreet =

Greatest hits album by Blackstreet
- Released: June 10, 2003
- Recorded: 1993–1999
- Genre: R&B, new jack swing, soul
- Label: Interscope
- Producer: Teddy Riley (executive)

Blackstreet chronology
| Level II (2003) | No Diggity: The Very Best of Blackstreet (2003) |

Singles from No Diggity: The Very Best of Blackstreet
- 1. "Billie Jean" Released: 2003

Professional ratings
Review scores
| Source | Rating |
|---|---|
| AllMusic | 4/5 stars |
| The Rolling Stone Album Guide | 4/5 stars |

No Diggity: The Very Best of Blackstreet is a greatest hits compilation by R&B group Blackstreet, released on June 10, 2003.

== Track listing ==
| No. | Title | Length |
|---|---|---|
| 1. | "Baby Be Mine" | 5:52 |
| 2. | "Booti Call" | 4:17 |
| 3. | "Before I Let You Go" | 5:01 |
| 4. | "Joy (New Carnegie Mix)" | 4:03 |
| 5. | "Falling in Love Again" | 4:34 |
| 6. | "Tonight's the Night" | 4:19 |
| 7. | "No Diggity" (featuring Dr. Dre & Queen Pen) | 5:05 |
| 8. | "Billie Jean" | 5:39 |
| 9. | "Never Gonna Let You Go" | 5:00 |
| 10. | "Don't Leave Me" | 5:10 |
| 11. | "I Can't Get You (Out of My Mind)" | 4:50 |
| 12. | "Fix" | 4:05 |
| 13. | "(Money Can't) Buy Me Love" | 3:29 |
| 14. | "Coming Home to You" | 4:48 |
| 15. | "Get Me Home" (Foxy Brown featuring Blackstreet) | 3:49 |
| 16. | "Girlfriend/Boyfriend" (featuring Janet Jackson, Ja Rule & Eve) | 4:03 |
| 17. | "The Lord Is Real (Time Will Reveal)" | 4:13 |

== Notes ==
- Tracks 1–6 are from the album Blackstreet
- Tracks 7, 9–13 and 17 are from the album Another Level
- Tracks 16 are from the album Finally
- Track 8 originally appeared as a remix on the "No Diggity" single and was referred to as "No Diggity (Billie Jean Remix)".
- Track 14 originally appeared on the soundtrack to the 1996 Spike Lee film Get On The Bus, and later on the soundtrack to the 1997 film Steel
- Track 15 is from Foxy Brown's album Ill Na Na
