= All My Love (Queen Pen song) =

1998 single by Queen Pen

Single by Queen Pen featuring Eric Williams

from the album My Melody
- B-side: "No Diggity"; "Party Ain't a Party"
- Released: January 20, 1998
- Length: 3:25
- Label: Interscope; Lil' Man
- Songwriters: Shawn Carter; Teddy Riley; Lynise Walters; Luther Vandross
- Producer: Teddy Riley

Queen Pen singles chronology
"Man Behind the Music" (1997)	"All My Love" (1998)	"Party Ain't a Party" (1998)

Music video
- "All My Love" on YouTube

"All My Love" is a song by American rapper Queen Pen featuring vocals from Eric Williams of R&B group Blackstreet. Sampling Luther Vandross's "Never Too Much", the song was written by Queen Pen, Jay-Z, and Teddy Riley, who also produced the track, and was included on Queen Pen's debut studio album, My Melody, in 1997. The following year, on January 20, "All My Love" was issued as the album's second single. Upon its release, the song reached number 28 on the US Billboard Hot 100 and number 11 on the UK Singles Chart. In New Zealand, the single peaked at number one for four weeks and was certified gold by the Recording Industry Association of New Zealand (RIANZ).

== Release and reception ==
"All My Love" was commercially released in the United States on January 20, 1998, and in the United Kingdom on April 27, 1998. British columnist James Masterton called the track a "brilliant" song and noted that it was a much better effort than Queen Pen's debut, "Man Behind the Music", while Music & Media magazine referred to the song as "catchy beyond belief".

In the US, "All My Love" peaked at number 28 on the Billboard Hot 100, number 17 on the Hot R&B Singles chart, number 14 on the Rhythmic Top 40, and number 11 on the Hot Rap Songs chart. In Canada, the track rose to number 21 on the RPM Dance ranking. On May 3, 1998, "All My Love" debuted at its peak of number 11 on the UK Singles Chart, staying in the top 100 for five weeks. Across the rest of Europe, the single entered the top 50 in France and Germany. The record was a number-one hit in New Zealand, where it stayed atop the RIANZ Singles Chart for four weeks, earned a gold certification for selling over 5,000 copies, and ended 1998 as the country's 13th-most-successful song.

== Track listings ==
US CD and cassette single

1. "All My Love" (LP version) – 3:25
2. "No Diggity" (Das Diggity radio) – 4:25

UK CD single

1. "All My Love" (radio edit) – 3:50
2. "All My Love" (album version) – 3:25
3. "Party Ain't a Party" (remix) – 4:36
4. "Party Ain't a Party" (album version) – 4:09

UK 12-inch single

A1. "All My Love" (album version) – 3:25
A2. "All My Love" (radio edit) – 3:50
B1. "Party Ain't a Party" (remix) – 4:36
B2. "Party Ain't a Party" (album version) – 4:09

UK cassette single

1. "All My Love" (radio edit) – 3:50
2. "All My Love" (album version) – 3:25

European CD single

1. "All My Love" (radio mix) – 3:26
2. "All My Love" (hook first) – 3:51

European maxi-CD single

1. "All My Love" (radio mix) – 3:26
2. "All My Love" (hook first) – 3:51
3. Excerpts from My Melody ("It's True"/"Get Away"/"Girlfriend")

== Personnel ==
Personnel are lifted from the US CD single liner notes.

- Jay-Z – writing (as Shawn Carter)
- Teddy Riley – writing, all instruments, production, programming, arrangement
- Queen Pen – writing (as Lynise Walters), vocals
- Luther Vandross – writing ("Never Too Much")
- Eric Williams – featured vocals

== Charts ==
=== Weekly charts ===
Weekly chart performance
Chart (1998)	Peak position
Canada Dance/Urban (RPM)	18
Europe (Eurochart Hot 100)	53
France (SNEP)	45
Germany (GfK)	49
Netherlands (Dutch Top 40 Tipparade)	7
Netherlands (Single Top 100)	62
New Zealand (Recorded Music NZ)	1
Scottish Singles Sales (Official Charts)	34
UK Singles (Official Charts)	11
UK Airplay (Music Week)	18
UK Dance (Official Charts)	13
UK Hip Hop/R&B (Official Charts)	2
US Billboard Hot 100	28
US Hot R&B Singles (Billboard)	17
US Hot Rap Singles (Billboard)	11
US Rhythmic Top 40 (Billboard)	14

=== Year-end charts ===
Chart (1998)	Position
New Zealand (RIANZ)	13
US R&B Singles (Billboard)	85
US Rhythmic Top 40 (Billboard)	64

== Certifications ==
Region	Certification	Certified units/sales
New Zealand (RMNZ)	Gold	5,000^{*}
^{*} Sales figures based on certification alone.

== Release history ==
Region	Date	Format(s)	Label(s)	Ref.
United States	November 24, 1997	Urban radio	Interscope; Lil' Man	
United States	January 20, 1998	CD	Interscope; Lil' Man	
United Kingdom	April 27, 1998	12-inch vinyl; CD; cassette	Interscope; Lil' Man	
