= My Melody (Queen Pen album) =

Studio album by Queen Pen
- Released: December 16, 1997
- Recorded: 1996–1997
- Studio: Future Recording Studios, Virginia Beach, Virginia
- Genre: Hip hop; R&B
- Length: 51:58
- Label: Lil' Man; Interscope
- Producer: Teddy Riley; Knobody; Kaseem "Mixture" Coleman; William "Skylz" Stewart

Queen Pen chronology
My Melody (1997)	Conversations with Queen (2001)

Singles from My Melody
- 1. "Man Behind the Music" Released: 1997; 2. "All My Love" Released: January 20, 1998; 3. "Party Ain't a Party" Released: 1998

Professional ratings
Review scores
Source	Rating
AllMusic	3/5 stars
The Source	3/5 stars

My Melody is the debut studio album by American rapper Queen Pen, released on December 16, 1997, by Lil' Man Records, a distribution by Interscope Records and was executive produced by Teddy Riley. The album went to number 78 on the Billboard 200, number 13 on the Top R&B/Hip-Hop Albums and number one on the Top Heatseekers, and had three charting singles: "Man Behind the Music", "All My Love" and "Party Ain't a Party".

== Track listing ==
Credits adapted from the album's liner notes.

No.	Title	Writer(s)	Producer(s)	Length
1.	"Intro"			4:14
2.	"Queen of the Click"	Shawn Carter; Teddy Riley; Lynise Walters; Kaseem Coleman	Teddy Riley; Mixture (co.)	3:32
3.	"Man Behind the Music"	Riley; Walters; Todd Gaither; Menton L. Smith	Riley	3:49
4.	"All My Love"	Carter; Riley; Walters	Riley	3:25
5.	"My Melody"	Walters; Riley	Riley	3:47
6.	"Party Ain't a Party" (featuring Mr. Cheeks, Markell Riley & Nutta Butta)	Walters; Riley; Terrance Kelly; Aqil Davidson; Idris Davidson; Smith	Riley	4:09
7.	"It's True"	Carter; Riley; Walters; Gary Kemp	Riley	4:38
8.	"The Set Up"	Walters; Riley; Jerome Foster	Knobody; Riley (co.)	4:21
9.	"Get Away" (featuring Phil Collins)	Walters; Riley	Riley	4:05
10.	"I'm Gon Blow Up" (featuring Ronald Isley)	Walters; Riley	Riley	4:02
11.	"Girlfriend" (featuring Me'Shell Ndegeocello)	Walters; Riley; Coleman	Riley; Mixture (co).
12.	"No Hooks"	Walters; Riley	Riley	3:18
13.	"So Many Ways"	Walters; William Stewart	William "Skylz" Stewart	4:13

Sample credits

- "Queen of the Click" contains an interpolation of "Put the Music Where Your Mouth Is", written by Pete Wingfield and Jo Wright.
- "Man Behind the Music" contains interpolations of:
  - "I Know You Got Soul", written by Bobby Byrd, Charles Bobbit, and James Brown.
  - "Your Love", written by James Brown.
- "All My Love" contains a sample of "Never Too Much", written and performed by Luther Vandross.
- "My Melody" contains an interpolation of "'Cause You Love Me Baby", written by Deniece Williams.
- "Party Ain't a Party" contains a sample of "On Your Face", written by Maurice White, Charles Stepney, and Philip Bailey; as recorded by Earth, Wind & Fire.
- "It's True" contains an interpolation of "True", by Spandau Ballet.
- "The Set Up" contains a sample of "Let Me Love You", written by Ray Parker Jr. and Michael Henderson, as recorded by Michael Henderson.
- "Get Away" contains a sample of "In the Air Tonight", written and performed by Phil Collins.
- "I'm Gon Blow Up" contains an interpolation of "Hollywood", written by David Wolinski and Louis Fischer.
- "Girlfriend" contains interpolations of:
  - "If That's Your Boyfriend (He Wasn't Last Night)", written by Michelle Johnson.
  - "It's Ecstasy When You Lay Down Next to Me", written by Ekundayo Paris and Nelson Pigford.
- "No Hooks" contains a sample of "My Friend in the Sky", written by Robert DeBarge and Bunny DeBarge, as recorded by Switch.

== Personnel ==
- Teddy Riley – keyboards, drum programming, backing vocals, executive producer
- Markell Riley – co-executive producer
- Madeline Nelson – co-executive producer
- Kaseem "Mixture" Coleman – keyboards, drum programming
- Knobody – keyboards, drum programming
- William "Skylz" Stewart – keyboards, drum programming
- Şerban Ghenea – bass guitar, recording engineer, mixing
- Richard Stites – backing vocals
- Freaky Tah – backing vocals
- Chauncey Hannibal – backing vocals
- George Mayers – recording engineer, mixing
- Coleman Dagget – recording engineer
- Earl Thomas – recording engineer
- Herb Powers – mastering
- Dorothy Low – photography

== Charts ==
Chart performance for My Melody
Chart (1998)	Peak position
US Billboard 200	78
US Top R&B/Hip-Hop Albums (Billboard)	13
