= Tonight's the Night (Blackstreet song) =

1995 single by Blackstreet

Single by Blackstreet featuring SWV and Craig Mack

from the album Blackstreet
- Released: August 1, 1995
- Genre: R&B; hip hop
- Length: 4:18
- Label: Interscope
- Songwriters: Teddy Riley; Tammy Lucas; Markell Riley; Pharrell Williams; Chad Hugo
- Producer: Teddy Riley

Blackstreet singles chronology
"Joy" (1995)	"Tonight's the Night" (1995)	"No Diggity" (1996)

"Tonight's the Night" is a song by American R&B group Blackstreet, released on August 1, 1995, as the sixth and final single from their self-titled debut album (1994). The remix version features R&B group SWV and rapper Craig Mack. The original version of the song features Tammy Lucas (who also wrote the song). All versions of the song feature Chauncey Hannibal on lead vocals. "Tonight's the Night" charted on three Billboard charts: number 80 on the Hot 100, 27 on the Hot R&B/Hip-Hop Singles & Tracks and 12 on the Hot Dance Music/Maxi-Singles Sales charts. A music video was made for the single, which was directed by Hype Williams.

== Charts ==
Chart (1995)	Peak Position
US Billboard Hot 100	80
US Hot Dance Music/Maxi-Singles Sales (Billboard)	12
US Hot R&B/Hip-Hop Singles & Tracks (Billboard)	27
US Cash Box Top 100	54
