= The Cleverlys =

American bluegrass & comedy cover band

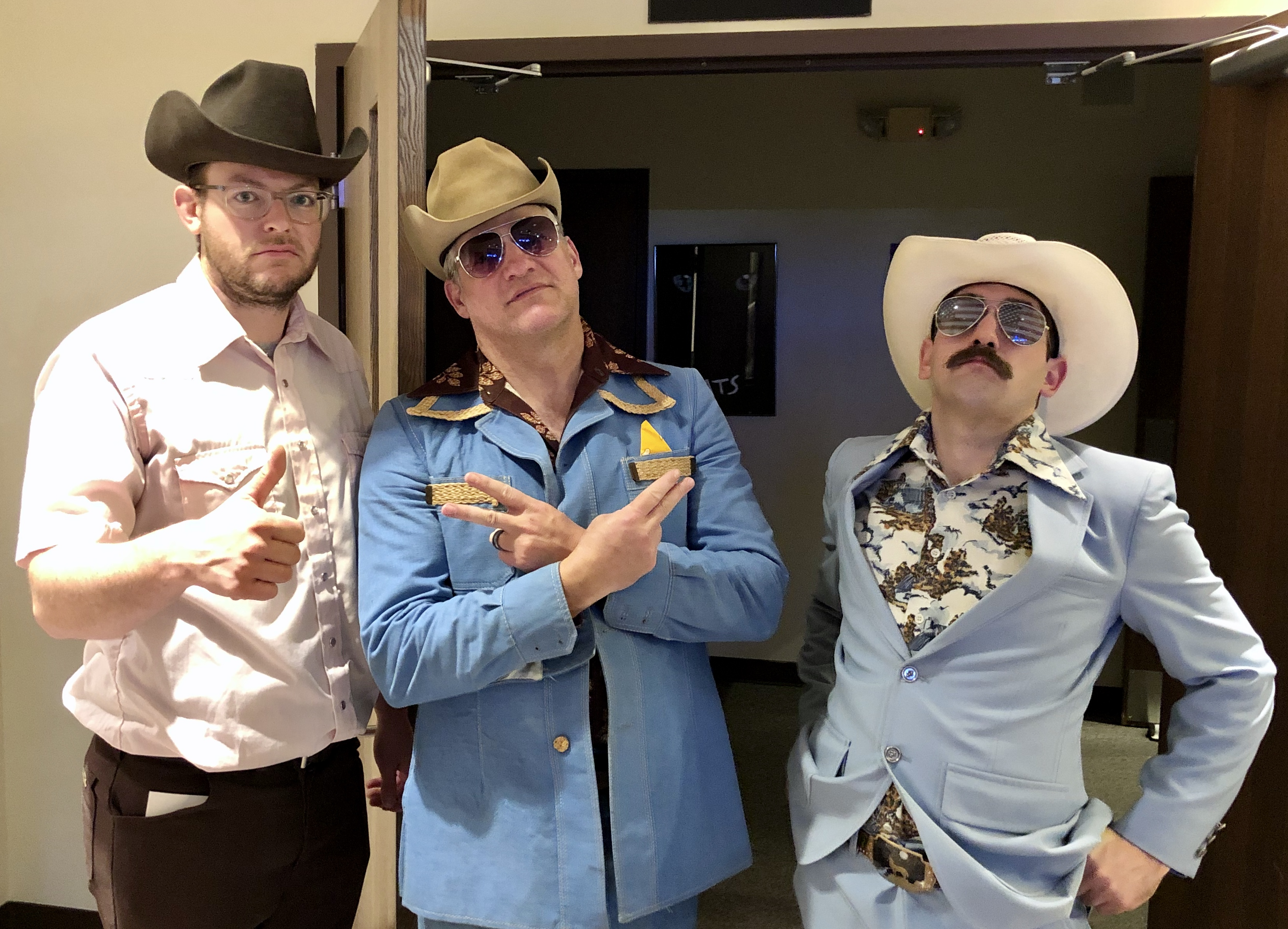
- "DVD", Paul Harris ("Digger Cleverly"), and "Digger Jr. Jr. Jr." in 2019

Background information
- Genres: Bluegrass; comedy; covers
- Years active: 2009–present
- Labels: Mountain Home
- Members: Paul Harris ("Digger Cleverly")
- Past members: Irl Hees ("Miles Cleverly")

The Cleverlys are a bluegrass & comedy cover band. The members play the double bass, banjos, and fiddles.

== History ==
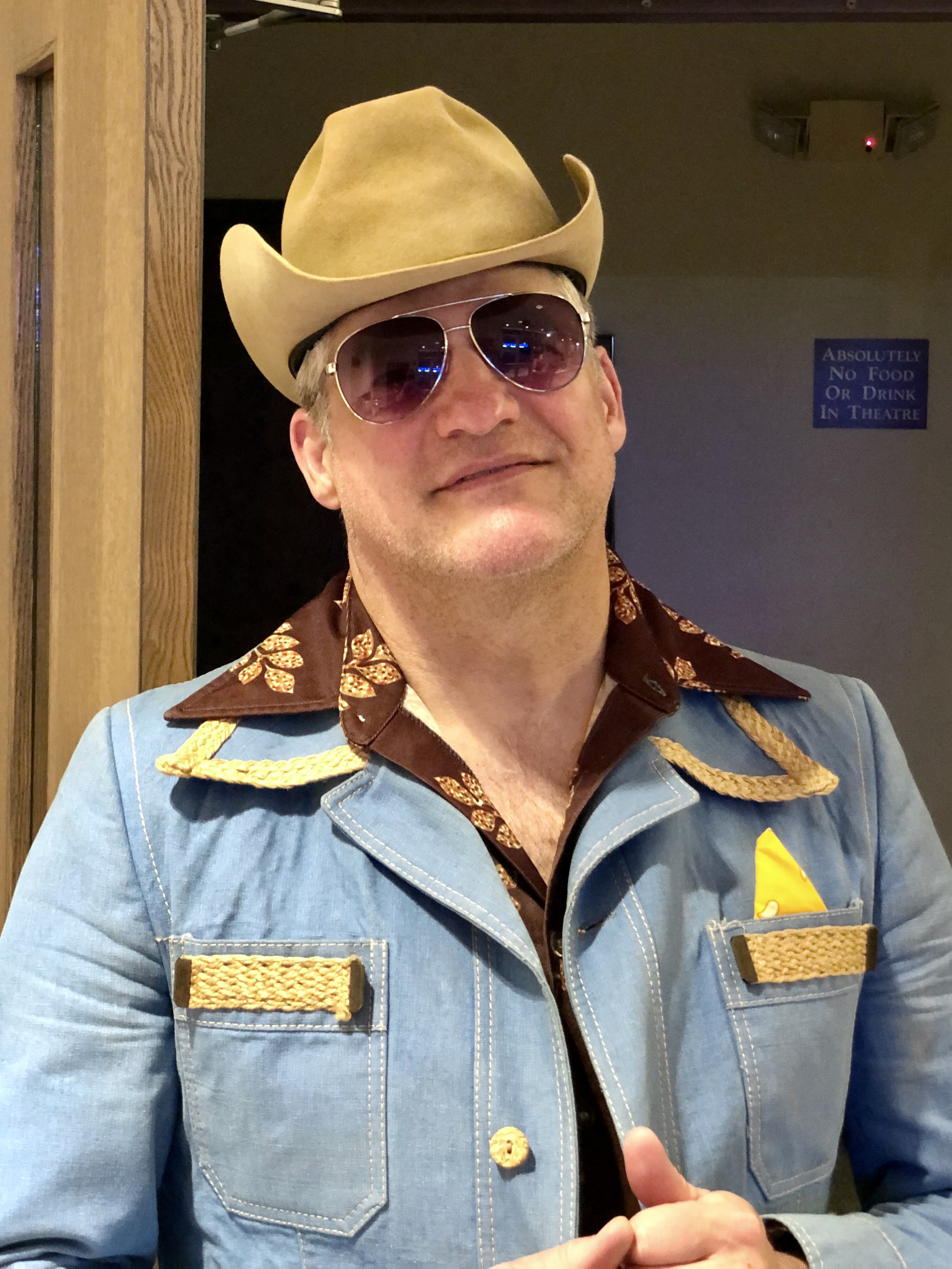
Paul Harris in Jackson, Tennessee (October 2019)

Paul Harris grew up in Arkansas and began working in entertainment in 1994, starting with comedy sketches before moving to stand-up comedy and finally comedy music. With experience in a punk music band under his belt, Harris moved to Nashville, Tennessee in 2006 to focus on the music industry there. Harris initially pitched his "Cleverlys" idea as a television show, but when talent agents began calling for the band, The Cleverlys were founded in 2009.

The new band first focused on covering hip hop and rhythm and blues songs for their intrinsic contrast to bluegrass music. Harris told The News & Advance in 2019 that his goal was to raise the standard for bluegrass comedy, away from the "podunk hillbilly, black[ed-out] tooth, bow tie, that type of thing". The band's lineup has changed over the years, something Harris attributed to strange arrangements and the unfamiliarity of character acting as "Cleverly" family members.

=== The fiction ===
Digger Cleverly's (Harris) father and four uncles founded the band in 1952 as the Cleverly Trio. Digger toured with Leif Garrett as the teen idol's E-string tuner before taking over the family band as its new patriarch. When they're not performing, the Cleverlys run their alpaca farm in Cane Spur, Arkansas, producing "everything from alpaca sausages and dairy products to woolly lingerie — though the latter hasn't quite caught on yet".

For new group members to get accustomed to their "Cleverly" alter egos, the band would get into character and walk around the towns in which they were performing as practice. Irl Hees played the band's blind bassist ("Miles Cleverly"), and related to The Boot how a local believed he was blind all the way to the driver's seat of his car.

=== Membership ===
Since 2009, band members have included Irl Hees ("Miles Cleverly") on double bass, Steve Bush ("Vernon Dean 'VD' Cleverly") on banjo, Mark Pearman ("Otto Cleverly") on fiddle, Stevie Wilkerson ("Harvey D. Cleverly") on drums, "Digger Jr.", "Digger Jr. Jr.", "Dale Vernon Dale 'DVD'", "Turtle", "Sock", and "Ricky Lloyd".

When musicians leave the group, the band's fictional history is amended duly: when Hees left the group, it was decided that his character was "arrested for running a bloody sloth-fighting ring." Harris does not kill the characters, to allow musicians to re-adopt them if the opportunity arises in the future.

== Music ==
=== Style ===
The Cleverlys' style of bluegrass has been described as rooted in the Ozarks.

=== Discography ===
In 2011, the band released The Cleverlys. A second album, Cash Crop was released in 2016. By March 2019, the band's album Blue was their newest release. A mockumentary about the Cleverlys was due to be released in spring 2011.

The Cleverlys

- Released: 2011

Cash Crop

- Released: 2016

Blue

- Format: CD
- Label: Mountain Home Music Company
- Tracks: 1 "Baby" (Justin Bieber, 2010) · 2 "Milkshake" (Kelis, 2003) · 3 "Girl in the Sky" · 4 "Blue (Da Ba Dee)" (Eiffel 65, 1998) · 5 "She's Not There" (The Zombies, 1964) · 6 "Wait a Minute" · 7 "Party Rock Anthem" (LMFAO, 2011) · 8 "Irreplaceable" (Beyoncé, 2006) · 9 "What's Up?" (4 Non Blondes, 1993) · 10 "I'm Gonna Be (500 Miles)" (The Proclaimers, 1988) · 11 "Oh Death" · 12 "The End of the Record"

=== Covers ===
- "Walk Like an Egyptian" by The Bangles (1986)
- "No Diggity" by Blackstreet (1996)
- "Angel" by Shaggy (2001)
- "Low" by Flo Rida (2007)
- "I Kissed a Girl" by Katy Perry (2008)
- "Single Ladies (Put a Ring on It)" by Beyoncé (2008)
- "Gangnam Style" by Psy (2012)

== Reception ==
Townsquare Media's The Boot praised the band saying, "we like our bluegrass to make us laugh." Bluegrass Today recommended seeing the Cleverlys, describing the group in 2019 as "high in dysfunction and low on personality, but alive with comedic possibility." By early 2019, some of the band's YouTube videos had been viewed over one million times, and AGDAILY called the group's cover of LMFAO's "Party Rock Anthem" one of the Cleverlys' "best ever".

In 2011, after performing at the CMA Music Festival and sharing an Independence-Day Nashville, Tennessee stage with Darius Rucker, the Cleverlys were invited to perform on the Grand Ole Opry on July 15 that year. The band has also performed at the Telluride Bluegrass Festival.
