= Joy (Blackstreet song) =

Single by Blackstreet

from the album Blackstreet
- Released: March 21, 1995
- Genre: R&B
- Length: 4:55
- Label: Interscope
- Songwriters: Teddy Riley; Michael Jackson; Tammy Lucas
- Producer: Teddy Riley

Blackstreet singles chronology
"U Blow My Mind" (1994)	"Joy" (1995)	"Tonight's the Night" (1995)

Music video
- "Joy" on YouTube

"Joy" is a song by American R&B group Blackstreet. Written by Teddy Riley, Michael Jackson and Tammy Lucas, it was released as the fifth single from the group's self-titled debut studio album (1994). Originally intended for his eighth studio album, Dangerous, the song features uncredited backing vocals by Jackson. "Joy" peaked at number 43 on the US Billboard Hot 100 chart.

== Track listing ==
- 12″ and CD single
1. "Joy" (LP version – no rap) – 4:54
2. "Joy" (Uptown Joy) – 4:13
3. "Joy" (Cool Joy) – 5:02
4. "Joy" (New Carnegie mix) – 4:03
5. "Joy" (Latin Combo) – 5:10
6. "Joy" (Quiet Storm) – 4:33

== Charts ==
=== Weekly charts ===
Weekly chart performance for "Joy"
Chart (1995)	Peak position
New Zealand (RIANZ)	43
UK Singles (Official Charts)	56
UK Club Chart (Music Week)	58
US Billboard Hot 100	43
US Hot R&B/Hip-Hop Songs (Billboard)	12
US Rhythmic Airplay (Billboard)	23
US Maxi-Singles Sales (Billboard)	13
US Cash Box Top 100	34

=== Year-end charts ===
Year-end chart performance for "Joy"
Chart (1995)	Position
US Hot R&B/Hip-Hop Songs (Billboard)	59

== Personnel ==
Credits adapted from Discogs.

- Engineering – Şerban Ghenea, George Mayers
- Mixing – Teddy Riley
- Written by Teddy Riley, Michael Jackson and Tammy Lucas
- Producer – Teddy Riley
- Remixing – Teddy Riley
- Saxophone – Mike Phillips
