= Conversations with Queen =

Studio album by Queen Pen
- Released: May 22, 2001
- Recorded: 2000–2001
- Genre: Hip hop
- Length: 50:06
- Label: Motown
- Producer: Teddy Riley; Daddy-O

Queen Pen chronology
My Melody (1997)	Conversations with Queen (2001)

Professional ratings
Review scores
Source	Rating
AllMusic	2/5 stars
Vibe	2.5/5 stars

Conversations with Queen is the second and final studio album by American rapper, Queen Pen. The album was released on May 22, 2001, on Motown and was executive produced by Kedar Massenburg and Queen Pen. Conversations with Queen was less successful than her debut studio album My Melody, only making it to number 134 on the Billboard 200 and number 31 on the Top R&B/Hip-Hop Albums. One single was released, "Ghetto Divorce", but it did not make it to the charts.

== Track listing ==
Credits adapted from the album's liner notes.

No.	Title	Writer(s)	Producer(s)	Length
1.	"Warn U" (featuring Kory Ward)	Lynise Walters; Darryl Pittman	D/R Period	3:48
2.	"Pussy Ain't for Free"	Walters; Tyrone Fyffe	Ty Fyffe	3:05
3.	"I Reps" (featuring Cam'ron, Prodigy and DJ Clue)	Walters; Pittman; Albert Johnson; Cameron Giles; Ernesto Shaw	D/R Period	3:33
4.	"QP/Cam'ron?" (featuring Cam'ron)			0:35
5.	"QP Walks"	Glenn Bolton; Arnold Hamilton; Marvin Nemley; Marvin Wright; Paul Huston; Walters	Daddy O	2:56
6.	"Ghetto Divorce" (featuring Miss Jones)	Walters; Tarsha Jones; Jeremy Cochise	Cochise	3:19
7.	"QP/Miss Jones?"			0:25
8.	"I Got Cha" (featuring Teddy Riley)	Walters; Teddy Riley; Fyffe	Teddy Riley; Ty Fyffe	2:38
9.	"Revolution" (featuring Stephen Marley and Damian Marley)	Walters; Stephen Marley; Damian Marley	Marley Boyz Production	4:46
10.	"QP/563?"			0:29
11.	"For You" (featuring Mr. Cheeks)	Walters; Denroy Morgan; Bert Reid	Marley Boyz Production	4:38
12.	"Baby Daddy"	Walters; Pittman	D/R Period	3:33
13.	"Cold, Cold World"	Walters; Pittman	D/R Period	3:41
14.	"True" (featuring Chico DeBarge)	Gary Kemp; Walters; Riley; Shawn Carter	Teddy Riley	4:22
15.	"What Yall Wanna Hear" (featuring Amil)	Walters; Pittman; Amil Whitehead	Chop D.I.E.S.E.L.	4:51
16.	"Who's The" (featuring Made Men)	Walters; Riley; Anthony Grant; Raymond Scott	Teddy Riley	3:27

Sample credits

- "Pussy Ain't for Free" contains a sample from "Put Your Body In It", performed by Stephanie Mills; written by Howard Terrance King and Edward Dennis Moore.
- "QP Walks" contains a sample of "Sally" performed by Stetsasonic.
- "Revolution" contains an interpolation of "Revolution", written by Bob Marley.
- "For You" embodies portions of "I'll Do Anything for You", written by Ron Miller and Bert Reid.
- "True" contains an interpolation from "True", written by Gary Kemp.
- "Who's The" contains a sample of "Don't Stop 'Til You Get Enough, written and performed by Michael Jackson.

== Charts ==
Chart (2001)	Peak position
US Billboard 200	134
US Top R&B/Hip-Hop Albums (Billboard)	31
