= Fix (Blackstreet song) =

1997 single by Blackstreet

Single by Blackstreet featuring Ol' Dirty Bastard, Slash and Fishbone

from the album Another Level
- B-side: "Call Me"
- Released: July 22, 1997
- Length: 4:06 (album version); 4:44 (remix)
- Label: Interscope
- Songwriters: Teddy Riley, Markell Riley, Chauncey Black, Melvin Glover, Ed Fletcher, Sylvia Robinson (album version); Teddy Riley, Markell Riley, Russell Jones, Saul Hudson (remix)
- Producers: Teddy Riley; Chauncey Black

Blackstreet singles chronology
"Don't Leave Me" (1997)	"Fix" (1997)	"(Money Can't) Buy Me Love" (1997)

Ol' Dirty Bastard singles chronology
"Hip Hop Drunkies" (1997)	"Fix" (1997)	"Ghetto Supastar (That Is What You Are)" (1998)

Slash singles chronology
"Give In to Me" (1993)	"Fix" (1997)	"Moja Mi Corazón" (1997)

Fishbone singles chronology
"Alcoholic" (1996)	"Fix" (1997)	"Crazy Bald Heads" (1997)

"Fix" is a song by American contemporary R&B group Blackstreet. It appears as the fourth track on their second studio album, Another Level (1996). A remixed version of the song was issued as the third single from the album and features the band Fishbone, as well as Ol' Dirty Bastard and ad-libs by Guns N' Roses guitarist Slash. The song peaked at number 58 on the US Billboard Hot 100 and entered the top 10 in Canada, the Netherlands, and the United Kingdom.

== Music video ==
The official music video for the song was directed by Paul Hunter.

== Chart ==
=== Weekly charts ===
Weekly chart performance for "Fix"
Chart (1997)	Peak position
Australia (ARIA)	69
Belgium (Ultratip Bubbling Under Flanders)	9
Belgium (Ultratop 50 Wallonia)	26
Canada (Nielsen SoundScan)	3
Europe (Eurochart Hot 100)	40
France (SNEP)	40
Germany (GfK)	67
Netherlands (Dutch Top 40)	9
Netherlands (Single Top 100)	15
New Zealand (Recorded Music NZ)	9
Scottish Singles Sales (Official Charts)	29
Sweden (Sverigetopplistan)	43
UK Singles (Official Charts)	7
UK Hip Hop/R&B (Official Charts)	1
US Billboard Hot 100	58
US Dance Singles Sales (Billboard)	6
US Hot R&B/Hip-Hop Songs (Billboard)	17
US Rhythmic Airplay (Billboard)	25

=== Year-end charts ===
Year-end chart performance for "Fix"
Chart (1997)	Position
Netherlands (Dutch Top 40)	65
Netherlands (Single Top 100)	57
UK Urban (Music Week)	32

== Release history ==
Region	Date	Format(s)	Label(s)	Ref.
United States	July 22, 1997	Commercial	Interscope	
United Kingdom	September 15, 1997	CD; cassette	Interscope	
United Kingdom	September 22, 1997	12-inch vinyl	Interscope	
Japan	October 22, 1997	CD		
