= Baby Be Mine =

1993 single by Blackstreet

Single by Blackstreet

from the album Blackstreet and CB4
- Released: February 23, 1993
- Recorded: July of 1992
- Genre: R&B; hip hop soul; new jack swing
- Length: 3:02
- Label: MCA
- Songwriters: Teddy Riley; Joseph Stonestreet; Pharrell Williams
- Producer: Teddy Riley

Blackstreet singles chronology
"Baby Be Mine" (1993)	"Booti Call" (1994)

"Baby Be Mine" is a song by the American R&B group Blackstreet. The song, which was recorded for the 1993 film CB4, was released in February 1993. This is the only Blackstreet song released to feature Joseph Stonestreet on lead vocals. The song was included on the group's debut album, Blackstreet (1994).

== Track listing ==
- 12-inch vinyl
1. "Baby Be Mine" (12" Remix) - 5:56
2. "Baby Be Mine" (Hip Hop Mix) - 3:40
3. "Baby Be Mine" (Club Mix) - 4:39
- CD
1. "Baby Be Mine" (12" Remix) - 5:56
2. "Baby Be Mine" (Hip Hop Mix) - 3:40
3. "Baby Be Mine" (Album Version) - 4:06
4. "Baby Be Mine" (Club Mix) - 4:39

- CD 1992 Promo Release
1. "Baby Be Mine" (12" Remix) - 5:56
2. "Baby Be Mine" (Hip Hop Mix) - 3:40
3. "Baby Be Mine" (Album Version) - 4:06
4. "Baby Be Mine" (Club Mix) - 4:39
5. "Say You Want Me"

== Personnel ==
- executive production – Nelson George, Kathy Nelson, Bill Stephney
- production – Teddy Riley, "Lil" Chris Smith

== Charts ==
Chart (1993)	Peak position
Europe (European Dance Radio)	5
US Maxi-Singles Sales (Billboard)	22
US Rhythmic Top 40 (Billboard)	1
US R&B Charts (Billboard)	17
