= Take Me There (Blackstreet and Mya song) =

1998 single by Blackstreet and Mýa

Single by Blackstreet and Mýa featuring Blinky Blink and Mase

from the album The Rugrats Movie: Music From the Motion Picture and Finally
- Released: November 30, 1998
- Recorded: September 1998
- Genre: Pop rap; R&B
- Length: 5:04 (original version); 4:03 (radio edit)
- Label: Interscope
- Songwriters: Mason Betha; Michael Foster; Madeline Nelson; Teddy Riley; Tamara Savage
- Producer: Teddy Riley

Blackstreet singles chronology
"The City Is Mine" (1998)	"Take Me There" (1998)	"Girlfriend/Boyfriend" (1999)

Mýa singles chronology
"Movin' On" (1998)	"Take Me There" (1998)	"Somebody Like Me" (1999)

Mase singles chronology
"Top of the World" (1998)	"Take Me There" (1998)	"I Really Like It" (1999)

Blinky Blink singles chronology
"Take Me There" (1998)	"Make Me Wanna Sing" (2000)

"Take Me There" is a song by American quartet Blackstreet and singer Mýa, featuring Bad Boy rappers Mase and Blinky Blink. It was written by Mase, Michael Foster, Madeline Nelson, Tamara Savage and Teddy Riley. Riley also produced the song. The song serves as the theme song for the animated feature film The Rugrats Movie and was released on November 30, 1998, as the lead and only single from the soundtrack. It also appeared on Blackstreet's third studio album, Finally.

"Take Me There" reached No. 1 in New Zealand for three weeks in January 1999 and achieved platinum status for selling over 10,000 copies there. In North America, the song peaked at No. 14 on the US Billboard Hot 100 and No. 21 on the Canadian RPM 100 Hit Tracks chart. It also became a hit in several European nations, peaking at No. 7 in the United Kingdom, No. 9 in Ireland, and No. 22 in the Netherlands.

== Background ==
Blackstreet initially became involved with The Rugrats Movie (1998) and its soundtrack after finding out that they were Nickelodeon's favorite R&B group. Looking for other ways to tap into what was popular with children, Teddy Riley enlisted the help of Mýa and Mase. Riley explained, "It would appeal to the kids, and to get a more... broader audience of the kids, it would be great to have Mýa and Mase." This collaboration resulted in the song "Take Me There," which Riley produced, incorporating the Rugrats theme song. Backstage at the 1998 MTV Video Music Awards, Mýa talked about the collaboration, saying, "We knocked it out in one day. Kids came to the studio [to hear the song], and they were listening to the song and singing right along, because [the song] rings a bell when you first hear it."

== Composition ==
"Take Me There" is a pop-rap and R&B song with a soft melody. It runs for four minutes and four seconds. The full-length version, including the instrumental section, is five minutes and two seconds. It contains interpolations of the original Rugrats TV theme, which was composed by Mark Mothersbaugh (uncredited).

== Music video ==
The music video premiered in October 1998. The video starts with cartoon character Angelica Pickles turning on the television to a clip of the Rugrats pulling the Reptar Wagon up a hill. The clip used appears to be the deleted scene "The Rugrats March". It takes place in a realistic live-action version of the Pickles' house, with Mýa and Blackstreet dancing through the house. Mýa is seen in Tommy Pickles's bedroom, the members of Blackstreet are seen in the kitchen, and Mase and Blinky Blink are seen driving the Reptar Wagon against a background of a scene from the film. As the video ends, Angelica turns the television off. The video premiered as a part of Blackstreet and Mýa's hosting of SNICK, and was directed by Luke Nola and Steve Saussey.

== Critical reception ==
Music Week felt by incorporating the cartoon's instrumental theme, "'Take Me There' could be an extremely catchy R&B number (boosted by the number of stars it features) if it wasn't challenging Jay-Z for most annoying release of the week."

== Chart performance ==
The single entered the US Billboard Hot 100 chart on December 5, 1998, peaking at No. 14 on January 23, 1999. It reached No. 10 on Billboard's Hot R&B/Hip Hop Songs chart. Internationally, it reached the top 10 in Ireland, the United Kingdom, and the top 20 in Japan. It also reached the top spot in New Zealand and was certified platinum by the Recording Industry Association of New Zealand.

The Rugrats Movie soundtrack was awarded a platinum certification in the United States for selling over one million copies. While the film's website credits sales to the strength of the major-label artists who participated, chart positions and sales correlate directly to the heavy promotions for the feature film's November 20, 1998, US release.

"Take Me There (Want U Back Mix)," which interpolates "I Want You Back" by the Jackson 5, peaked at No. 27 on the Billboard Hot 100 on December 19, 1998, after three weeks on the chart. It made its way onto the top 40 the same day. During the week of December 7, 1998, "Take Me There" peaked at No. 13 on the Hits of the World board in the United Kingdom. The song landed at No. 19 on the Video Monitor, the most-played clips monitored by the Broadcast Data Systems, via its airtime on BET. It also did very well on the MTV playlists, peaking at No. 21 in the same week. It was also well liked in The Clip List, making its debut on the Box Tops, and was played about 15 hours weekly on the California Music Channel (CMC).

Sound Tracks noted its popularity:

["Take Me There"] earn[ed] the Greatest Gainer/Airplay title for its 17% increase in audience. A remix by Big Yam using the melody of the Jackson 5's "I Want You Back" and a rap-less edit is helping the track make inroads on the radio. [...] the song's inclusion on the Burger King commercials promoting the Rugrats toys being offered by the fast-food giant is helping the song gain exposure. [...] Just look at the jump "Take Me There" took after The Rugrats Movie opened. "Take Me There" was shipped to radio the first week in October, but didn't affect the charts until the film took off.

The movie's success helped the soundtrack stay at No. 20 on the Billboard 200 chart for five weeks.

== Remixes ==
A remix which samples Jackson 5's number-one hit "I Want You Back" was promoted to radio stations and made commercially available on a CD single in the United Kingdom. This version did not appear in the film and was not included on the soundtrack. It also appears on Blackstreet's 1999 album Finally; this version omits Mase and Blinky Blink, possibly because their verses primarily revolve around the Rugrats characters. A second remix, "Take Me There (Thugrats Remix)" appears on the "Girlfriend/Boyfriend" single featuring new verses from Mase and Blinky Blink.

== Track listing ==
1. "Take Me There" (radio version) – 4:01
2. "Take Me There" (Want U Back mix) – 4:00
3. "Take Me There" (album version) – 5:04
4. "Take Me There" (instrumental) – 5:01

== Charts ==
=== Weekly charts ===
Weekly chart performance for "Take Me There"
Chart (1998–1999)	Peak position
Belgium (Ultratip Bubbling Under Flanders)	5
Canada Top Singles (RPM)	21
Canada Dance/Urban (RPM)	8
Europe (Eurochart Hot 100)	47
Germany (GfK)	58
Iceland (Íslenski Listinn Topp 40)	29
Ireland (IRMA)	9
Netherlands (Dutch Top 40)	22
Netherlands (Single Top 100)	22
New Zealand (Recorded Music NZ)	1
Scottish Singles Sales (Official Charts)	21
UK Singles (Official Charts)	7
UK Hip Hop/R&B (Official Charts)	2
US Billboard Hot 100	14
US Hot R&B/Hip-Hop Songs (Billboard)	10
US Pop Airplay (Billboard)	13
US Rhythmic Airplay (Billboard)	2

=== Year-end charts ===
1998 year-end chart performance for "Take Me There"
Chart (1998)	Position
UK Singles (OCC)	120
UK Urban (Music Week)	22

1999 year-end chart performance for "Take Me There"
Chart (1999)	Position
Netherlands (Dutch Top 40)	150
US Billboard Hot 100	91
US Mainstream Top 40 (Billboard)	53
US Rhythmic Top 40 (Billboard)	22

== Certifications ==
Certifications and sales for "Take Me There"
Region	Certification	Certified units/sales
New Zealand (RMNZ)	Platinum	10,000^{*}
^{*} Sales figures based on certification alone.

== Release history ==
Release dates and formats for "Take Me There"
Region	Date	Format(s)	Label(s)	Ref.
United States	October 26, 1998	Urban radio	Interscope	
United Kingdom	November 30, 1998	CD; cassette	Interscope	

== See also ==
- List of UK top 10 singles in 1998
- List of number-one singles from the 1990s (New Zealand)
