= Before I Let You Go =

Single by Blackstreet

from the album Blackstreet
- Released: November 22, 1994
- Studio: Future Recording Studios (Virginia Beach, Virginia, US)
- Genre: R&B
- Length: 4:59
- Label: Interscope
- Songwriters: C. Hannibal; D. Hollister; M. Riley; T. Riley; L. Sylvers
- Producer: Teddy Riley

Blackstreet singles chronology
"Booti Call" (1994)	"Before I Let You Go" (1994)	"U Blow My Mind" (1994)

Music video
- "Before I Let You Go" on YouTube

"Before I Let You Go" is a song by American R&B group Blackstreet, recorded for the group's self-titled debut album (1994). The song was released as the third single for the album in November 1994 by Interscope Records. It was notable for featuring lead vocals from Dave Hollister who joined the group upon the album's release.

"Before I Let You Go" peaked at number seven on the US Billboard Hot 100 and number two on the Hot R&B Singles chart. This made it the group's highest charting single on both charts respectively before it was surpassed by "No Diggity" two years later. The song lyrically focuses on the narrator who does not want to lose the love of his life out of concern that she is no longer romantically interested and wants her to "say goodnight" as opposed to "say goodbye."

== Critical reception ==
Ralph Tee from the Record Mirror Dance Update gave "Before I Let You Go" three out of five, naming it "the big ghetto love ballad" of the album.

== Track listing ==
- 12", CD, Maxi
1. "Before I Let You Go" (Main Mix One) - 5:00
2. "Before I Let You Go" (Main Mix Two) - 5:00
3. "Before I Let You Go" (Instrumental) - 5:00
4. "Before I Let You Go" (Acapella Mix) - 4:52
5. "Before I Let You Go" (Reggae Dub Mix) - 5:00
6. "Before I Let You Go" (T.R. Mix) - 4:56
7. "Before I Let You Go" (Blackstreet Live Version) - 5:10

== Personnel ==
Information taken from Discogs.

- drums – Gerald Heyward
- engineering – Serban Ghenea, John Hanes, George Mayers
- guitar – Serban Ghenea
- mixing – Serban Ghenea, John Hanes, George Mayers, Teddy Riley
- production – Teddy Riley
- remixing – Teddy Riley
- writing – C. Hannibal, D. Hollister, M. Riley, T. Riley, L. Sylvers

== Charts ==
=== Weekly charts ===
Chart (1994)	Peak position
US Billboard Hot 100	7
US Hot R&B/Hip-Hop Songs (Billboard)	2
US Maxi-Singles Sales (Billboard)	7
US Rhythmic Airplay (Billboard)	2
US Cash Box Top 100	15

=== Year-end charts ===
Chart (1994)	Position
US Hot R&B/Hip-Hop Songs (Billboard)	85

Chart (1995)	Position
Brazil (Crowley)	62
US Billboard Hot 100	46
US Hot R&B/Hip-Hop Songs (Billboard)	8
