= CB4 (soundtrack) =

CB4 (Original Motion Picture Soundtrack)

Soundtrack album by Various artists
- Released: March 2, 1993
- Recorded: 1992–1993
- Genres: Hip hop; parody
- Length: 51:21
- Label: MCA
- Producers: Bill Stephney (exec.); Kathy Nelson (exec.); Nelson George (exec.); Carl Shocklee; Gary G-Wiz; Hank Shocklee; KRS-One; Pal Joey; Dr. Jam; DJ Hurricane; Mario Caldato Jr.; Beastie Boys; Diamond D; Organized Noize; P.M. Dawn; Teddy Riley; Daddy-O

CB4 (Original Motion Picture Soundtrack) is the official soundtrack to the 1993 comedy film of the same name. It was released on March 2, 1993, through MCA Records. The album has peaked at #41 on the Billboard 200 and #13 on the Top R&B/Hip-Hop Albums. The album is composed of twelve R&B and hip hop tracks from various artists and producers. It spawned a Blackstreet-performed single "Baby Be Mine", which peaked at #17 on the Hot R&B/Hip-Hop Songs. Three songs on the album were credited to the fictional CB4 group from the movie, the trio consisted of Chris Rock and rappers Daddy-O & Hi-C.

== Background ==
CB4 was a 1993 comedy film starring the stand-up comic comedian and Saturday Night Live castmember Chris Rock. He co-wrote and co-produced the film alongside journalist and film director Nelson George. The satirical film was intended to the hip-hop equivalent of the 1984 American mockumentary film This Is Spinal Tap, but with a slightly more tributary, affectionate tone. It was a major studio release in 1993, as most other rap-related motion pictures that year had circumvented studio negotiations and taken an independent avenue. That summer saw the well-received premieres of two motion pictures at the Sundance Film Festival: Fear of a Black Hat—like CB4, a raw, topical parody of rap—and the award-winning drama film Fly by Night. The rap-oriented comedy film was procured around at the same time as Fear of a Black Hat. The films express a particular purposeful cynicism applied to the genre of rap music. All three retain revolve around protagonists who are middle-class, African-American youth trying to reinvent themselves into hardcore gangsta-rappers and wind up as misguided posers. However, Rock downplayed any suggestion that they were truly attempting to target widespread hypocrisy among rappers in CB4, being a lifelong fan of hip-hop himself.

Similar to Fear of a Black Hat, CB4 features as its central spoof a rap group clearly a thinly veiled parody of N.W.A. The film's premise was built on the rise of N.W.A with having aspiring rapper Albert (Rock) and his friends Mike (Allen Payne) and Otis (Dearon Thompson) adopt the personas of criminals in order to attain notoriety, only for Albert's alter-ego MC Gusto to attracting the ire of the actual man named Gusto (Charlie Murphy) that he's based on. The trio pursue their dreams of rap stardom while trying to stay a step ahead of Gusto, groupies and censorship. With Rock comprising a rap group alongside Daddy-O and Hi-C, the album was a gimmick necessitated by the accompanying film, containing their parodies of and tributes to other hit hip-hop songs from the early 1990s In addition more comedic numbers, the film's soundtrack contains non-satirical songs contributed by acts such as Public Enemy and Boogie Down Productions.

== Recording and production ==
The recording of CB4 Soundtrack was light on filler, and involved a diverse lineup of music acts from various coastal regions. CB4 were functional rap group both on and off film, with Rock joined by Daddy-O and Hi-C in performing the verses, and Otis and Mike lip syncing to pre-recorded tracks. N.W.A founding member MC Ren made a contribution with “Mayday on the Front Line.” The track was produced by a Dr. Jam and would be recycled for his own album “Shock of the Hour” later that same year.

Almost all songs besides than those performed by Chris Rock faux-real rap group did not remain exclusive to the soundtrack. Both the MC Ren and Fu-Schnickens songs eventually wound up on their own albums, while “Livin’ in a Zoo” was included as a “remix” bonus track in a Public Enemy album after this soundtrack was released. Boogie Down Production's "Black Cop" was later included by KRS-One on his debut solo album, Return of the Boom Bap. The R&B song "Baby Be Mine" by BLACKstreet was included on their self-titled debut album the following year.

== Music and lyrics ==
The CB4 Soundtrack is part of period from the mid-1980's to late-1990's at the height of a deluge of hip-hop soundtracks, with film albums that were almost entirely composed of rap, alongside a few crossover R&B songs for broadened appeal. The soundtrack is light on filler, and has a diverse lineup of music acts from various coastal regions. With Rock in a rap group alongside Daddy-O and Hi-C, the album was a gimmick, containing their parodies of and tributes to other hit hip-hop songs from the early 1990s. Much like the film, the soundtrack thematically centers around the rise of N.W.A, with aspiring rapper Albert and his friends Mike and Otis adopting the personas of criminals in order to attain notoriety. Throughout the album, they impersonate the swagger and appeal of the gangsta rap group. With Rock joined by Daddy-O and Hi-C in performing the verses, the characters Otis and Mike lip sync to tracks.

The piano-driven track “Mayday on the Front Line” features a performance by N.W.A founding member MC Ren. “Livin’ in a Zoo” is a politically charged number by Public Enemy. The rap ground CB4 perform a parody tribute version of “Straight Outta Compton” entitled “Straight Outta Locash”. The R&B crossover single "Baby Be Mine" by BLACKstreet shared with the hip hop tracks. CB4 closes the soundtrack with an affectionate tribute to Sugarhill Gang’s breakthrough single “Rappers Delight.”

== Release and promotion ==
CB4 (Original Motion Picture Soundtrack) was made available in store before the film was released into theaters. The soundtrack album features the single, "Baby Be Mine" by BLACKstreet.

== Critical reception ==
Professional ratings
Review scores
Source	Rating
Allmusic	3/5 stars
Robert Christgau	(3-star Honorable Mention)

In his consumer guide for The Village Voice, music critic Robert Christgau gave the album a three-star honorable mention, indicating "an enjoyable effort consumers attuned to its overriding aesthetic or individual vision may well treasure." He summarized the soundtrack by saying, "the rap rainbow, from goof-off to off-whitey."

== Commercial performance ==
BLACKstreet's single "Baby Be Mine" was an R&B crossover that broadened appeal and helped the soundtrack album chart. In the United States, the soundtrack's success was secured by the single, which reached number 17 on the U.S. Billboard Hot R&B/Hip-Hop Songs charts.

== Track listing ==
No.	Title	Writer(s)	Producer(s)	Length
1.	"The 13th Message/Livin' in a Zoo" (performed by Public Enemy)	C. DeHaney; C. Ridenhour; G. G-Wiz; H. Shocklee	Carl Shocklee; Gary G-Wiz; Hank Shocklee	7:24
2.	"Black Cop" (performed by Boogie Down Productions)	L. Parker	KRS-One; Pal Joey	3:01
3.	"Mayday on the Front Line" (performed by MC Ren)	L. Patterson; H. Milling	Dr. Jam	4:02
4.	"Stick 'Em Up" (performed by DJ Hurricane & Beastie Boys)	M. Diamond; A. Yauch; A. Horovitz; W. Fite	Beastie Boys; Mario Caldato Jr.; DJ Hurricane	2:48
5.	"Sneaking Up on Ya" (performed by Fu-Schnickens)	J. Jones; J. Kirkland; L. Maturine; R. Roachford	Diamond D	3:24
6.	"Lifeline" (performed by Parental Advisory)	J. Hollins; K. Prather; M. Sinclair; P. Brown; R. Murray; R. Wade	Organized Noize	4:39
7.	"The Nocturnal Is in the House" (performed by P.M. Dawn)	A. Cordes	P.M. Dawn	4:19
8.	"Baby Be Mine" (performed by Blackstreet)	J. Stonestreet; T. Riley	Teddy Riley	5:53
9.	"It's Alright" (performed by Tracie Spencer)	H. Rasmussen; M. Spencer; T. Spencer	Dr. Jam; Sir Spence (co.)	3:46
10.	"Sweat from My Balls" (performed by CB4 (Daddy-O & Hi-C))	E. Barrier; N. Wilson; C. Rock; G. Bolton; C. Wilkerson; N. George	Daddy-O	3:10
11.	"Straight Out of Locash" (performed by CB4 (Daddy-O & Hi-C))	A. Young; E. Wright; L. Patterson; O. Jackson; C. Rock; G. Bolton; C. Wilkerson	Daddy-O	3:10
12.	"Rapper's Delight" (performed by CB4 (Daddy-O, Hi-C & Kool Moe Dee))	B. Edwards; N. Rodgers; B. Stephney; N. George	Daddy-O	5:35
Total length:				51:21

== Charts ==
=== Weekly charts ===
Chart (1993)	Peak position
US Billboard 200	41
US Top R&B/Hip-Hop Albums (Billboard)	13

=== Year-end charts ===
Chart (1993)	Position
US Top R&B/Hip-Hop Albums (Billboard)	98
