= Booti Call =

Single by Blackstreet

from the album Blackstreet
- B-side: "I Like the Way You Work"
- Released: July 28, 1994
- Genre: New jack swing
- Length: 4:26
- Label: Interscope
- Songwriters: George Clinton; Antwone Dickey; Leon F. Sylvers III; Markell Riley; Teddy Riley; Erick Sermon; Garry Shider; David Spradley; Larry Troutman; Roger Troutman
- Producers: Markell Riley; Teddy Riley; Erick Sermon

Blackstreet singles chronology
"Baby Be Mine" (1993)	"Booti Call" (1994)	"Before I Let You Go" (1994)

"Booti Call" is a song by American R&B group Blackstreet, recorded for the group's self-titled debut album (1994). The song was co-written and produced by Markell Riley, Teddy Riley and Erick Sermon, and released as the second single from the album in July 1994 by Interscope Records.

== Background ==
According to group member Teddy Riley, the song was written about his friend Mike Tyson, whose rape trial resulted in a According to the group's longtime friend and affiliate Thomas "Cree" McEntyre , Joseph Stonestreet originally sang lead on Booty Call but his background Vocals and lead Vocals were removed after left the group due to his disputes with Teddy Riley which is the reason why Teddy Riley sings lead on the song.

== Critical reception ==
Pan-European magazine Music & Media wrote, "Mark the point where Swingbeat Boulevard and Hip Hop Drive cross as Blackstreet. Still streetwise, but with more class—no Rolex imitations and baseball caps—the music is likewise." Ralph Tee from the Record Mirror Dance Update gave the song a score of four out of five, noting that "Teddy Rileys new group are proving to be enormous." He also complimented its "infectiously cheeky Why must I chose the cat chorus hook.

== Track listing ==
- 12", vinyl
1. "Booti Call" (K.C. Miami Mix) - 4:42 (feat. T-Pirate)
2. "Booti Call" (T.R. Pop Mix) - 4:21 (feat. T-Pirate)
3. "Booti Call" (T.R. Doggie Mix) - 7:01 (feat. T-Pirate)
4. "Booti Call" (Doggie Dub Mix) - 4:30
5. "Booti Call" (No Rap Radio Mix) - 4:21
6. "Booti Call" (Gotta Get U Home With Me Mix) - 4:06 (feat. T-Pirate)
7. "I Like the Way You Work" (T.R. Blackstreet Mix) - 5:18
8. "I Like the Way You Work" (Papa Lee Mix) - 4:53 (feat. Menton Smith)
9. "I Like the Way You Work" (T.R. Uptown Mix) - 4:04 (feat. Menton Smith)
10. "I Like the Way You Work" (Ballad Mix) - 4:10
- 12", vinyl (Promo)
1. "Booti Call" (LP Version) - 4:17 (feat. T-Pirate)
2. "I Like the Way You Work" (LP Version) - 4:25 (feat. Nutta Butta)
3. "I Like the Way You Work" (LP Version) - 4:25 (feat. Nutta Butta)
4. "Booti Call" (LP Version) - 4:17 (feat. T-Pirate)

== Personnel ==
Information taken from Discogs.

- production – Markell Riley, Teddy Riley, Erick Sermon
- rapping – Nutta Butta, T-Pirate
- writing – A. Dickey, M. Graham, C. Hannibal, L. Little, M. Riley, T. Riley, E. Sermon, M. Smith, L. Sylvers
- engineering assistant - Sprague Williams, Kimberly Smith

== Charts ==
Chart (1994)	Peak position
UK Singles (OCC)	56
UK Dance (OCC)	19
UK Dance (Music Week)	19
UK Club Chart (Music Week)	60
US Billboard Hot 100	34
US Hot Dance Music/Maxi-Singles Sales (Billboard)	3
US Hot R&B/Hip-Hop Singles & Tracks (Billboard)	14
US Rhythmic Top 40 (Billboard)	19
US Cash Box Top 100	35
