= Level II (Blackstreet album) =

Studio album by Blackstreet
- Released: March 11, 2003
- Recorded: 2002–2003
- Studio: Future Recording Studios (Virginia Beach, Virginia)
- Genres: R&B; new jack swing; electro-funk
- Length: 62:26
- Label: DreamWorks
- Producers: Teddy Riley; Leroy Burgess; Nate "Danjahandz" Hills; Andreao "Fanatic" Heard

Blackstreet chronology
Finally (1999)	Level II (2003)	No Diggity: The Very Best of Blackstreet (2003)

Singles from Level II
- 1. "Deep" Released: 2002; 2. "Wizzy Wow" Released: 2002

Level II is the fourth album by American R&B group, Blackstreet. It was released by DreamWorks Records on March 11, 2003, in the United States, their first and only album released on the record label. The album's title was a reference to its members' best known line-up during their most successful album, 1996's Another Level. Two of the members returned for the recording of Level II. Mark Middleton returned to the fold after he was replaced by Terrell Phillips on 1999's Finally to launch a gospel music career. Dave Hollister returned on the song "Bygones", as he also left the group to start his solo career.

== Background ==
Founding members Teddy Riley and Chauncey Hannibal patched things up to record Level II. A few years earlier, they were involved in a very public dispute that signaled the group's demise at the end of 1999. After Blackstreet's eventual dissolution, Riley entered into a short-lived reunion with his previous group Guy. Hannibal attempted a solo career, while Eric Williams returned to writing and producing for other artists such as Dave Hollister, Donell Jones and Jaheim.

Riley also attempted a solo career as well, with a deal with Virgin Records in 2000. His solo recording Black Rock was shelved despite promotional copies of the album being issued. Another project that he worked on was the Capitol Records singer Michael "Mike E." Etheridge, a former member of The Neptunes. His debut album Master Plan- which was executive produced by Riley- was also shelved, and as a result, several songs on the unreleased albums made their way on Level II. "Look In The Water" was originally recorded by Mike E. for his album, but Riley re-recorded the song with Blackstreet's vocals. Several songs from Riley's unreleased album Black Rock ("Friend Of Mine", "You Made Me", "Deep" and "Bygones") were also re-recorded for this album. The artwork for the edited version has the logo colored blue as opposed to the red color on the uncut version.

== Critical reception ==
Professional ratings
Aggregate scores
Source	Rating
Metacritic	59/100
Review scores
Source	Rating
Blender	2/5 stars
Dotmusic	8/10
Entertainment Weekly	C+
Mojo	1/5 stars
Q	3.5/5 stars
Rolling Stone	3/5 stars
Slant Magazine	2/5 stars
Uncut	3/5 stars
Vibe	2.5/5 stars

The album received generally positive reviews. At Metacritic, which assigns a rated mean out of 100 from mainstream critics, the album received a score of 59, based on nine reviews. Chicago Tribune editor Matt Lurie found that "on their latest sublime offering, Level II, the group delivers raunch, slickness and infinitely controlled melisma that can send chills up the spine of any fan of gospel singing." Rolling Stone critic James Hunter felt thath Level II "continues the Riley vision. Without fuss, the songs operate in R&B's timeless romantic-sexual universe of men [...] The music that contains all this back-and-forth is state-of-the-art R&B [...] Like most of Riley's music, it's full of gorgeous air, exposed emotions and rhythms that have a mathematical integrity."

AllMusic wrote that "Riley's status as the father of new jack swing means these 17 songs bristle with the kinds of grooves and beats that found his trademark sound serving as the bridge between the electro-funk of the '80s and hip-hop-driven R&B of the '90s. Peppered with plenty of scenarios of pursuit and seduction, some of Riley's more overt musical innuendoes include a moanin' remake of a Rose Royce track." People magazine felt that Teddy Riley's "jittery, popping street beats, which were so fresh back in 1996, sound somewhat dated on uptempo tracks like "Wizzy Wow" (featuring rapper Mystikal). BlackStreet is better off on melody-driven ballads such as the pretty, acoustic-guitar-laced "Bygones," which, for one soulful song, reunites the group with original member-gone-solo Dave Hollister."

== Commercial performance ==
Level II was released with little to no promotion, as DreamWorks Records was on the verge of being absorbed by their previous label Interscope Records. Issued on March 11, 2003, the album debuted and peaked at number 14 on the US Billboard 200 and number four on the Top R&B/Hip-Hop Albums chart, selling 53,000 copies in its first week of release.

== Track listing ==
Level II track listing
No.	Title	Writer(s)	Producer(s)	Length
1.	"Ticket To Ride (Intro)"	T. Riley, T. Lucas, R. Stanard, C. Scarborough, M. White	Teddy Riley, Shareefa Cooper, Sean Washington, Kenny Frazier, Kenny Quiller	3:17
2.	"Don't Touch (featuring Mr. Cheeks)"	T. Riley, R. Stanard, T. Kelly, E. Williams, M. Middleton, L. Richie, M. Williams, W. Orange, T. McClary, R. LaPread, W. King	Leroy Burgess	3:30
3.	"She's Hot"	T. Riley, C. Black, B. Turner	Teddy Riley	3:24
4.	"Deep"	T. Riley, R. Stanard	Teddy Riley	4:22
5.	"Ooh Girl"	T. Riley, C. Black, R. Stanard, N. Whitfield	Teddy Riley	3:27
6.	"Friend Of Mine"	T. Riley, J. Clawson, R. Stanard	Leroy Burgess, Superb	3:49
7.	"Interlude: What's The Fuss?"			0:40
8.	"You Made Me"	T. Riley, R. Stanard	Leroy Burgess	4:33
9.	"It's So Hard To Say Goodbye"	T. Riley, C. Black, D. Marshall, C. Cofield, W. Butler, C. Davis, O. Leavi	Daryl "DL" Marshall, Chauncey Black, Teddy Riley	4:15
10.	"Why, Why"	T. Riley, M. Woolard, A. Williams, J. Williams, N. Hills, J. Bettis, S. Porcaro	Teddy Riley, Nate Hills, Natural Blend	3:34
11.	"Look In The Water"	T. Riley, M. Etheridge, P. Williams, M. Hucknall, N. Moss	Teddy Riley	4:48
12.	"Baby You're All I Want"	T. Riley, E. Williams, Jahid, W. Hodges	Eric Williams, Wesley Hodges	3:55
13.	"How We Do"	T. Riley, E. Peoples, P. Williams, D. King II	Eugene Peoples, Teddy Riley, Prathan "Spanky" Williams	3:48
14.	"Bygones"	T. Riley, A. Heard, S. Barnes	Teddy Riley, Andreao "Fanatic" Heard, Sherrod Barnes	4:20
15.	"Interlude: Still Feelin' You"			2:05
16.	"Brown Eyes"	T. Riley, B. Reeves, P. Lees	Teddy Riley, Philosophy	3:34
17.	"Wizzy Wow (featuring Mystikal)"	T. Riley, R. Stanard, M. Tyler, C. Black, E. Williams, M. Middleton, M. Watts	Teddy Riley	3:22
Total length:				62:26

Sample credits

- "Ticket To Ride" contains a sample of "Earth, Wind & Fire", as performed by Earth, Wind & Fire
- "Don't Touch" contains a sample of "Brick House", as performed by Commodores
- "She's Hot" contains an interpolation of "Warning", as performed by The Notorious B.I.G.
- "Ooh Girl" contains an interpolation of "Ooh Boy", as performed by Rose Royce
- "It's So Hard To Say Goodbye" contains a sample of "My Love", as performed by Gene Chandler
- "Why, Why" contains an interpolation of "Human Nature", as performed by Michael Jackson
- "Look In The Water" contains a sample of "Holding Back the Years", as performed by Simply Red

== Personnel ==
- Teddy Riley, Jean-Marie Horvat – recording engineers, mixing
- Brian Turner, Jim Quarles – assistant engineers
- David Campbell – string arrangements & conducting
- Tony Dawsey – mastering
- Joseph Cultice – photography
- D.L. Warfield – art direction, design

== Charts ==
Weekly chart performance for Level II
Chart (2003)	Peak position
French Albums (SNEP)	136
US Billboard 200	14
US Top R&B/Hip-Hop Albums (Billboard)	4

== Release history ==
Level II release history
Region	Date	Format	Label	Ref(s)
United States	March 11, 2003	CD; Digital download	DreamWorks	
