= QDT =

American hip hop supergroup

- Also known as: QDT Muzik
- Genres: Hip hop; West Coast hip hop
- Occupation: Production group
- Years active: 2009–present
- Members: DJ Quik; Snoop Dogg; Teddy Riley

QDT is an American production supergroup composed of DJ Quik, Snoop Dogg and Teddy Riley. QDT stands for Quik-Dogg-Teddy. The group worked in tandem to produce and record most tracks on Snoop Dogg's ninth studio album, Ego Trippin' (2008). Although not officially disbanded, the group has not worked as a collective since the album's release.

== History ==
Snoop Dogg used the production group extensively on his album Ego Trippin'. Bumping into Teddy Riley at the VH1's 2007 Hip-Hop Honors, Snoop says he felt that God was telling him that he "needed to work with this guy.".

DJ Quik, explains that the group wants to help artists get their music heard:

"Snoop started this company called QDT (Quik-Dogg-Teddy). We produce records and write songs for other cats that don't have access to great producers or songwriters," Quik told AllHipHop.com. "We are trying to be a medium between them and the record company. Teddy has been writing for the Pussycat Dolls and other people at Interscope. Snoop has been writing for his groups, and I've been storing tracks for them when it's time to go full-fledged with it."
