= Don't Leave Me (Blackstreet song) =

1997 single by Blackstreet

Single by Blackstreet

from the album Another Level
- Released: February 18, 1997
- Genre: R&B
- Length: 5:20
- Label: Interscope
- Songwriters: Teddy Riley; Chauncey Black; Roosevelt "Bink" Harrell; Karen Anderson; Bunny DeBarge
- Producers: Teddy Riley; Bink!

Blackstreet singles chronology
| "Get Me Home" (1996) | "Don't Leave Me" (1997) | "Fix" (1997) |

Music video
- "Don't Leave Me" on YouTube

"Don't Leave Me" is a song by American R&B group Blackstreet, produced by Teddy Riley and released in February 1997 by Interscope Records as the third single from their second album, Another Level (1996). It contains a sample of the DeBarge song "A Dream". "Don't Leave Me" features Eric Williams, Mark Middleton, and Chauncey Hannibal on lead vocals. It topped the New Zealand Singles Chart for two weeks in May 1997 and reached No. 6 in the United Kingdom. In the United States, the song peaked at No. 12 on the Billboard Hot 100 Airplay chart. Michael Martin directed the accompanying music video.

== Critical reception ==
Pan-European magazine Music & Media noted that after the success of "No Diggity", "Riley & Co. switch to ballad mode with this well constructed song, which has already met with approval across Europe." Stephan Hampe, head of music at RSH, a CHR network covering northern Germany commented, "I think this is going to break Blackstreet in a big way in Germany, because it is the kind of great song that really stands out". He added, "while 'No Diggity' received a warm welcome too, it remained largely confined to the quarters traditionally inhabited by the R&B fraternity over here. This record however, has the potential to appeal to a much broader audience, so we put in powerplay rotation (32 plays a week) because we want to familiarize our audience quickly with this song."

David Finlan from Experience said that the song "is slightly depressing, because it is about a man trying to keep his girlfriend from breaking up with him. This song hits home because everybody has been through a breakup and as we all know, they are not fun." Malaysian newspaper New Straits Times noted "the fantastic four-part harmony interplay" on "Don't Leave Me". A reviewer from People Magazine stated that Blackstreet "pours on the heartache and late-night yearning". David Fricke from Rolling Stone felt "the turn-ons" in songs like "Don't Leave Me", "are as banal as the titles suggest." James L. Brown from USC Today described it as "a slow bump and grind ballad".

== Chart performance ==
The song did not chart on the US Billboard Hot 100 or the Hot R&B Singles chart due to Billboard rules at the time preventing songs not released as physical singles from charting. However, the song peaked on the Hot 100 Airplay and Hot R&B Airplay charts at No. 12 and No. 1, respectively. Internationally, it went to No. 1 in New Zealand and No. 6 in the United Kingdom. In the former country, it stayed at No. 1 for two weeks in May 1997 and earned a gold sales certification from the Recording Industry Association of New Zealand (RIANZ), finishing the year as the 12th-most successful single.

== Music video ==
The official music video for the song was directed by Michael Martin.

== Track listings ==
UK CD single
| No. | Title | Length |
|---|---|---|
| 1. | "Don't Leave Me" (radio edit) | 4:24 |
| 2. | "Don't Leave Me" (album version) | 5:10 |
| 3. | "No Diggity" (Das Diggity radio) | 4:25 |
| 4. | "No Diggity" (Teddy Riley Jungle Remix) | 8:03 |

UK 12-inch single
| No. | Title | Length |
|---|---|---|
| 1. | "Don't Leave Me" (album version) | 5:10 |
| 2. | "No Diggity" (Das Diggity radio) | 4:25 |
| 3. | "No Diggity" (Teddy Riley jungle mix) | 8:03 |
| 4. | "No Diggity" (BJ Das radio) | 4:20 |

UK cassette single
| No. | Title | Length |
|---|---|---|
| 1. | "Don't Leave Me" (radio edit) | 4:24 |
| 2. | "No Diggity" (Das Diggity radio) | 4:25 |

European CD single
| No. | Title | Length |
|---|---|---|
| 1. | "Don't Leave Me" (radio edit) | 4:22 |
| 2. | "No Diggity" (Teddy Riley jungle mix) | 8:02 |

== Charts ==
=== Weekly charts ===
| Chart (1997) | Peak position |
|---|---|
| Belgium (Ultratop 50 Wallonia) | 23 |
| Canada Dance/Urban (RPM) | 15 |
| Europe (Eurochart Hot 100) | 33 |
| France (SNEP) | 19 |
| Germany (GfK) | 23 |
| Iceland (Íslenski Listinn Topp 40) | 21 |
| Ireland (IRMA) | 25 |
| Israel (Israeli Singles Chart) | 20 |
| Netherlands (Dutch Top 40) | 16 |
| Netherlands (Single Top 100) | 20 |
| New Zealand (Recorded Music NZ) | 1 |
| Scottish Singles Sales (Official Charts) | 28 |
| Sweden (Sverigetopplistan) | 33 |
| Switzerland (Schweizer Hitparade) | 27 |
| UK Singles (Official Charts) | 6 |
| UK Dance (Official Charts) | 5 |
| UK Hip Hop/R&B (Official Charts) | 2 |
| US Radio Songs (Billboard) | 12 |
| US Pop Airplay (Billboard) | 19 |
| US R&B/Hip-Hop Airplay (Billboard) | 1 |
| US Rhythmic Airplay (Billboard) | 1 |

=== Year-end charts ===
| Chart (1997) | Position |
|---|---|
| Belgium (Ultratop 50 Wallonia) | 88 |
| France (SNEP) | 83 |
| New Zealand (RIANZ) | 12 |
| Romania (Romanian Top 100) | 57 |
| UK Singles (OCC) | 67 |
| US Hot 100 Airplay (Billboard) | 39 |
| US Hot R&B Airplay (Billboard) | 2 |
| US Rhythmic Top 40 (Billboard) | 2 |
| US Top 40/Mainstream (Billboard) | 54 |

== Certifications ==
| Region | Certification | Certified units/sales |
|---|---|---|
| New Zealand (RMNZ) | Gold | 5,000^{*} |
| United Kingdom (BPI) | Silver | 200,000^{‡} |
^{*} Sales figures based on certification alone.^{‡} Sales+streaming figures based on certification alone.

== Release history ==
| Region | Date | Format(s) | Label(s) | Ref. |
|---|---|---|---|---|
| United States | February 18, 1997 | Rhythmic contemporary radio | Interscope | |
| United Kingdom | April 14, 1997 | 12-inch vinyl; CD; cassette | Interscope | |
