= Finally (Blackstreet album) =

1999 studio album by Blackstreet

Studio album by Blackstreet
- Released: March 23, 1999 (U.S.)
- Recorded: 1997–1998
- Studios: Future Recording Studios (Virginia Beach, Virginia, U.S.)
- Genres: R&B; soul; hip hop; new jack swing
- Length: 56:46
- Label: Interscope
- Producers: Teddy Riley, Warryn Campbell, Eric Williams

Blackstreet chronology
Another Level (1996)	Finally (1999)	Level II (2003)

Singles from Finally
- 1. "Take Me There" Released: November 30, 1998; 2. "Girlfriend/Boyfriend" Released: May 25, 1999; 3. "Think About You" Released: July 31, 1999; 4. "In a Rush" Released: January 22, 2000

Professional ratings
Review scores
Source	Rating
Allmusic	3.5/5 stars
The Baltimore Sun	3/4 stars
Entertainment Weekly	B+
Hartford Courant	(favorable)
Q	3/5 stars
Rolling Stone	2.5/5 stars
Spin	(8/10)
Vibe	(favorable)

Finally is the third album from American contemporary R&B group Blackstreet. It was released on Interscope Records on March 23, 1999. Finally was the only album to feature Terrell Phillips, after the departure of Mark Middleton. After the success of their multi-platinum last album Another Level, their label allowed them a bigger budget for the next album. Finally was recorded at Teddy Riley's studio Future Recording Studios based in Virginia Beach, Virginia. Originally given the working title Get Higher, the album was scheduled for a November 1998 release until it was pushed back to March 1999.

The album has high-profile guests, such as Janet Jackson, Stevie Wonder and Hezekiah Walker. The album also features several songs with string arrangements from conductor Jeremy Lubbock. The music video for the single "Girlfriend/Boyfriend" was directed by Joseph Kahn. Complete with computer animation and 3D graphics, the video was considered to be one of the most expensive at the time. Finally was critically acclaimed but a commercial disappointment, moving units at only a fraction of what their previous album sold. Shortly after the release of the single "Think About You", Riley left Blackstreet to reform his previous group Guy and Blackstreet were subsequently dropped by Interscope Records.

Despite the album's failure, a couple of songs have been covered by other artists. British singer Sonique covered the song "Drama" on her album Hear My Cry as a duet with R&B singer Calvin Richardson. Korean pop group SS501 later covered the song "In A Rush" live in one of their concert performances. The title track of the album appeared as the closing track on Hezekiah Walker’s album “Family Affair” which was released later on in the year.

== Track listing ==
No.	Title	Writer(s)	Producer(s)	Length
1.	"Blackstreet Intro/Can You Feel Me"	1a: Teddy Riley: 1b: Riley; Todd Gaither	1a: Teddy Riley: 1b: Riley; Kaseem Coleman (co.)	4:22
2.	"Girlfriend/Boyfriend" (with Janet Jackson featuring Ja Rule and Eve)	Riley; Jimmy Cozier; Cynthia Loving; Jeffrey Atkins; Eve Jeffers	Teddy Riley	4:03
3.	"Yo Love" (featuring Sauce Money)	Riley; Chauncey Hannibal; Antwone Dickey; Gaither; Walter Scott	Riley; Walter "Mucho" Scott (co.)	4:43
4.	"I Got What You On" (featuring Beanie Sigel)	Riley; Hannibal; Sherri Blair; Davel McKenzie; Eric Williams; Dwight Grant	Riley; Davel McKenzie (co.)	4:12
5.	"Drama/Misery Interlude"	5a: Williams; Riley; Wesley Hogges; Andrea Hicks; 5b: Riley; Darryl Adams; LaMenga Kafi; Terrell Phillips	5a: Riley; Eric Williams; Wesley Hogges (co.); 5b: Riley; Darryl "Dezo" Adams (co.)	7:39
6.	"I'm Sorry"	Riley; Blair	Riley	5:26
7.	"Think About You"	Riley; Blair	Riley	4:36
8.	"Black & White"	Riley; Tijuana Frampton; Albert Charles	Riley; Jack Knight (co.); Screwface (co.)	3:38
9.	"In A Rush" (featuring Stevie Wonder)	Warryn Campbell; Riley	Riley; Warryn Campbell	4:09
10.	"Hustler's Prayer"	Riley; Trevis Williams; Jodie Wilson; Darnell	Riley; Trevis Williams (co.); Jodie Wilson (co.)	4:48
11.	"Finally" (featuring Hezekiah Walker & Love Fellowship Tabernacle)	Riley; Kafi; Hezekiah Walker	Riley	4:54
12.	"Take Me There (Remix)" (featuring Mýa)	Riley; Tamara Savage; Madeline Nelson; Mason Betha; Michael Foster; Freddie Perren; Alphonso Mizelle; Berry Gordy; Deke Richards	Riley; Gerald Baillergeau (r.); Victor Merritt (r.)	4:14
13.	"On the Floor (Enhanced CD bonus track)" (featuring Queen Pen)	Riley; Frampton; Charles; Lynise Walters	Riley; Jack Knight (co.); Screwface (co.)	4:22

Sample credits

- "Can You Feel Me" contains a sample from "Can You Feel It", written by Michael Jackson and Jackie Jackson, as recorded by The Jacksons.
- "Take Me There (Remix)" contains:
  - excerpts of "The Rugrats Theme", written by Mark Mothersbaugh.
  - a sample from "I Want You Back"; written by Freddie Perren, Alphonso Mizelle, Berry Gordy, and Deke Richards; as recorded by The Jackson 5.

== Charts ==
Weekly chart performance for Finally
Chart (1999)	Peak position
Australian Albums (ARIA)	25
Canadian Albums (Billboard)	14
Dutch Albums (Album Top 100)	21
French Albums (SNEP)	33
German Albums (Offizielle Top 100)	34
Swiss Albums (Schweizer Hitparade)	34
UK Albums (Official Charts)	27
UK R&B Albums (Official Charts)	15
US Billboard 200	9
US Top R&B/Hip-Hop Albums (Billboard)	4

== Certifications ==
Region	Certification	Certified units/sales
Canada (Music Canada)	Gold	50,000^{^}
United States (RIAA)	Gold	500,000^{^}
^{^} Shipments figures based on certification alone.
