= Blackstreet (album) =

Studio album by Blackstreet
- Released: June 21, 1994
- Recorded: 1993–1994
- Studios: Future Recording Studios (Virginia Beach, Virginia, U.S.)
- Genres: R&B; new jack swing
- Length: 73:06
- Label: Interscope
- Producers: Teddy Riley; John McClain; Michael Concepcion; Michael "Flip" Barber; Markell Riley; Erick Sermon; Lil' Chris Smith; Leon Sylvers III

Blackstreet chronology
Blackstreet (1994)	Another Level (1996)

Singles from Blackstreet
- 1. "Baby Be Mine" Released: February 23, 1993; 2. "Booti Call" Released: July 28, 1994; 3. "Before I Let You Go" Released: November 22, 1994; 4. "U Blow My Mind" Released: December 28, 1994; 5. "Joy" Released: March 21, 1995; 6. "Tonight's the Night" Released: August 1, 1995

Blackstreet is the debut album from the American R&B group Blackstreet, released in 1994 on Interscope Records. The group was formed in 1991 by Teddy Riley with along Chauncey Hannibal, and Joseph "Street" Stonestreet after the dissolution of Teddy Riley's former group Guy. The trio recruited Levi Little to work as a session singer alongside Hannibal and Stonestreet for Bobby Brown's third album Bobby, an album that was mostly produced by Riley. They recorded one song for the soundtrack of the Chris Rock film CB4 called "Baby Be Mine". Stonestreet left the group due to disputes with Teddy Riley in 1994, and was replaced by former Force One Network singer Dave Hollister.

Hip hop producer Erick Sermon co-produced the second single "Booti Call", which was a response to the rape trial and conviction of professional boxer Mike Tyson at the time of the album's release. Riley, who was a close friend of Tyson, referenced his incarceration in the album's liner notes: and to our main man Mike Tyson "we can't wait". The song's opening was done by stand up comedian Bill Bellamy, who popularized his infamous saying on an episode of Russell Simmons' Def Comedy Jam. The second single "Before I Let You Go" was released with a music video that featured appearances by actors Omar Epps and Shari Headley.

Also on the album is a former member of the Sylvers, the songwriter and producer Leon Sylvers III, who collaborated with Riley on the writing and production of several songs on the album. Riley's proteges the Neptunes make one of their earliest appearances on Blackstreet as well, with Pharrell Williams and Chad Hugo receiving a co-writing and assistant producer credit on the song "Tonight's the Night", while Hugo plays the saxophone on the ballad "Happy Home". Singer Michael Jackson helped with the composition of "Joy" – a song that was originally intended for Jackson's 1991 album Dangerous. Blackstreet would be the only album with members Hollister and Little, who left the group at the end of 1995.

The album peaked at number 52 on the Billboard 200 chart. By April 1995, it was certified Platinum by the RIAA, after sales exceeding 1,000,000 copies in the United States. Blackstreet's cover of the Stevie Wonder song "Love's in Need of Love Today" was featured in the 1995 Harrison Ford film Sabrina, but it does not appear on the film's soundtrack album.

== Release and reception ==
Professional ratings
Review scores
Source	Rating
AllMusic	4/5 stars
Q	4/5 stars
The Rolling Stone Album Guide	2.5/5 stars
Select	2/5 medals
The Source	(favorable)

The album peaked at fifty-two on the U.S. Billboard 200 and reached the seventh spot on the R&B Albums chart. The album was certified platinum by April 1995.

While Stanton Swihart of AllMusic commented that some of the songs weren't fully formed and others sounded like new jack retreads, he did remark that the work included "some brilliantly catchy R&B tracks, songs that easily stood out in the mid-'90s urban soul crowd."

== Track listing ==
- Songwriting and production credits adapted from liner notes.

No.	Title	Music	Producer(s)	Length
1.	"Intro (Blackstreet Philosophy) [Interlude]"	Riley, "Lil" Chris Smith	Teddy Riley, "Lil" Chris Smith	0:56
2.	"Baby Be Mine"	Iverson, Riley, Stonestreet, Williams, "Lil" Chris Smith	Teddy Riley	3:02
3.	"U Blow My Mind"	Hannibal, Hollister, Riley, Smith	Teddy Riley, "Lil" Chris Smith	3:49
4.	"Hey Love (Keep It Real) [Interlude]"	Dickey, Riley, Sylvers	Teddy Riley, Leon Sylvers III	1:11
5.	"I Like the Way You Work"	Graham, Hannibal, Little, Riley, Riley, Smith	Teddy Riley, Markell Riley	4:44
6.	"Good Life"	Brown, Callis, Linzer, Riley, Wynn	Teddy Riley, David Wynn	4:04
7.	"Physical Thing"	Drakeford, Hannibal, Little, Riley, Riley, Tex, Williams, Smith	Teddy Riley, Markell Riley	4:38
8.	"Make U Wet"	Barber, Davidson, Hannibal, Riley, Sylvers	Teddy Riley, Michael "Flip" Barber	4:59
9.	"Booti Call"	Clinton, Dickey, Riley, Riley, Sermon, Shider, Spradley, Sylvers, Troutman	Teddy Riley, Markell Riley, Erick Sermon	4:26
10.	"Love's in Need"	Wonder	Teddy Riley	4:41
11.	"Joy"	Michael Jackson	Teddy Riley	4:55
12.	"Before I Let You Go"	Hannibal, Hollister, Riley, Riley, Sylvers	Teddy Riley	4:59
13.	"Confession [Interlude]"	Hollister, Riley, Riley, Williams	Teddy Riley, Markell Riley	0:54
14.	"Falling in Love Again"	Hannibal, Hollister, Little, Riley, Riley	Teddy Riley, Markell Riley	4:34
15.	"Candlelight Night [Interlude]"	Taliaferro, Riley, Stonestreet,	Teddy Riley	0:54
16.	"Tonight's the Night"	Hugo, Lucas, Riley, Riley, Williams	Teddy Riley, Markell Riley	4:18
17.	"Happy Home"	Davis, Sylvers, Hannibal, Riley, Riley	Teddy Riley, Markell Riley	5:38
18.	"Wanna Make Love"	Riley, Stonestreet, Watkins, Sylvers,	Teddy Riley	5:00
19.	"Once in a Lifetime [Interlude]"	Taliaferro, Riley, Stonestreet	Teddy Riley, Markell Riley	1:02
20.	"Givin' You All My Lovin'"	Riley, Riley, Smith, Sylvers	Teddy Riley, Leon Sylvers III	4:12

== Charts ==
=== Weekly charts ===
Chart (1994)	Peak position
US Billboard 200	52
US Top R&B/Hip-Hop Albums (Billboard)	7

=== Year-end charts ===
Chart (1994)	Position
US Top R&B/Hip-Hop Albums (Billboard)	32

Chart (1995)	Position
US Billboard 200	127
US Top R&B/Hip-Hop Albums (Billboard)	25

=== Singles ===
Year	Single	Peak chart positions			
Year	Single	U.S. Billboard Hot 100	U.S. Hot Dance Music/Maxi-Singles Sales	U.S. Hot R&B/Hip-Hop Singles & Tracks	U.S. Rhythmic Top 40
1993	"Baby Be Mine"	14	22	—	1
1994	"Booti Call"	34	3	14	19
1994	"Before I Let You Go"	7	7	2	2
1995	"Joy"	43	13	12	23
1995	"Tonight's the Night"	80	12	27	—

"—" denotes releases that did not chart.

== Certifications ==
Region	Certification	Certified units/sales
United Kingdom (BPI)	Silver	60,000^{^}
United States (RIAA)	Platinum	1,000,000^{^}
^{^} Shipments figures based on certification alone.

== Personnel ==
Information taken from AllMusic.

- assistant engineering – Serban Ghenea, George Mayers, Kimberly Smith, Sprague Williams
- assistant executive production – Mike Concepcion, John McClain
- associate production – Chad Hugo, "Lil" Chris Smith, Markell Riley, Leon F. Sylvers III, Thomas Taliaferro, Sprague Williams
- design – Eric Altenburger
- engineering – Serban Ghenea, John Hanes, George Mayers, Herb Powers, Kimberly Smith
- guitar – Serban Ghenea, Thomas Taliaferro
- mastering – Herb Powers
- mixing – John Hanes, George Mayers, Teddy Riley
- performing – Tammy Lucas
- photography – Gerhard Yurkovic
- production – Michael Barber, Markell Riley, Teddy Riley, Erick Sermon, "Lil" Chris Smith, Leon F. Sylvers III
- project coordination – Dan O'Leary
- rapping – Idris Davidson, Antwone Dickey, Markell Riley, Menton Smith, David Roland Williams
- saxophone – Chad Hugo
- stylist – Kareen Linton
- vocal coach – Kenny Hicks
- vocals – Chauncey Hannibal, Dave Hollister, Levi Little, Teddy Riley, Joseph Stonestreet
