= Another Level (Blackstreet album) =

Studio album by Blackstreet
- Released: September 10, 1996
- Recorded: 1995–1996
- Studios: Future Recording Studios, Virginia Beach, Virginia, U.S.
- Genres: R&B; hip hop soul; pop
- Length: 70:22
- Label: Interscope
- Producers: Teddy Riley (exec.); Chauncey Hannibal; Bink!

Blackstreet chronology
Blackstreet (1994)	Another Level (1996)	Finally (1999)

Singles from Another Level
- 1. "No Diggity" Released: July 29, 1996; 2. "Don't Leave Me" Released: February 18, 1997; 3. "Fix" Released: July 22, 1997

Professional ratings
Review scores
Source	Rating
AllMusic	4.5/5 stars
Chicago Tribune	2.5/4 stars
Muzik	3.5/5 stars
Robert Christgau	(neither)
Rolling Stone	(average)
The Rolling Stone Album Guide	3.5/5 stars
The Source	(favorable)
Vibe	(positive)

Another Level is the second studio album by American R&B group Blackstreet. Released on September 10, 1996, it was the first album with new members Eric Williams and Mark Middleton. They joined the group after replacing departed members Dave Hollister and Levi Little. Another Level was also the first Blackstreet album released under Interscope Records' new distribution deal with MCA Music Entertainment, Inc. after the company was dropped by Time Warner several months before the release of the album.

Another Level was Blackstreet's most commercially successful album, reaching No. 3 on the Billboard 200 albums chart, and No. 1 on the Top R&B Albums chart for five weeks and selling over 4 million copies. It contains the group's biggest hit to date, the Billboard Hot 100 No. 1 single "No Diggity".

Despite Another Level being their most successful recording and the huge success of the single "No Diggity", member/producer Teddy Riley stated in a 2013 interview with BBC Radio 1Xtra host Ronnie Herel that the album did not have a signature song.

In 2023, the album track "Never Gonna Let You Go" appeared in the Sam Esmail film, Leave the World Behind.

== Track listing ==
No.	Title	Writer(s)	Producer(s)	Length
1.	"Black & Street Intro"	Teddy Riley; Chauncey Hannibal	Teddy Riley	1:14
2.	"This Is How We Roll"	Teddy Riley; Frank Pimentel; Joyce Dean	Teddy Riley; Frank "Nitty" Pimentel	3:31
3.	"No Diggity" (featuring Dr. Dre and Queen Pen)	Teddy Riley; Chauncey Hannibal; Lynise Walters; William Stewart; Andre Young	Teddy Riley; William "Skylz" Stewart	5:03
4.	"Fix"	Teddy Riley; Chauncey Hannibal; Markell Riley	Teddy Riley; Chauncey Hannibal (co.)	4:04
5.	"Good Lovin'"	Teddy Riley; Chauncey Hannibal; Sherri Blair; Markell Riley	Teddy Riley; Chauncey Hannibal (co.)	4:31
6.	"Let's Stay in Love"	Teddy Riley; Chauncey Hannibal; Sherri Blair	Teddy Riley; Chauncey Hannibal (co.)	4:15
7.	"We Gonna Take U Back (Lude)/Don't Leave Me"	Teddy Riley; Roosevelt Harrell; Chauncey Hannibal; Karen Anderson	Teddy Riley; Roosevelt "Bink" Harrell (co.)	5:17
8.	"Never Gonna Let You Go"	Teddy Riley; Chauncey Hannibal; Sherri Blair; Markell Riley; Mark Middleton	Teddy Riley; Chauncey Hannibal (co.)	5:00
9.	"I Wanna Be Your Man"	Teddy Riley; Sprague Williams; Karen Anderson; Markell Riley; Chauncey Hannibal	Teddy Riley; Sprague Williams (co.)	4:05
10.	"Taja's Lude (Interlude)"	Taja Riley	Teddy Riley	0:27
11.	"My Paradise (Interlude)"	Teddy Riley; Chauncey Hannibal; Sherri Blair; Mark Middleton	Teddy Riley	2:11
12.	"Deja's Poem"	Deja Riley; Donna Roberts	Teddy Riley	0:24
13.	"(Money Can't) Buy Me Love"	Paul McCartney; John Lennon	Teddy Riley; Chauncey Hannibal (co.)	3:38
14.	"Blackstreet (On the Radio)" (Radio interview with Morris Baxter and Blackstreet)			3:18
15.	"I Can't Get You (Out of My Mind)"	Eric Williams; Wesley Hogges; Cliff Lighty; Teddy Riley	Teddy Riley; Eric Williams; Wesley Hogges	4:50
16.	"I'll Give It to You"	Teddy Riley; Chauncey Hannibal; Xavier Hargrove; Sherri Blair	Teddy Riley; Xavier Hargrove (co.)	4:16
17.	"Happy Song (Tonite)"	Tommy Sims; Karen Anderson; Teddy Riley; Mark Middleton	Teddy Riley; Tommy Sims (co.)	5:38
18.	"Motherlude"	Mildred Riley; Ada McKenzie; Lucille Middleton; Ella Mae Williams	Teddy Riley	4:35
19.	"The Lord Is Real (Time Will Reveal)"	Teddy Riley; Mark Middleton; Chauncey Hannibal; Bernard Belle	Teddy Riley	4:13

Sample credits

- "No Diggity" contains portions of "Grandma's Hands", written and performed by Bill Withers.
- "Fix" contains a portion of "The Message", written by Edward Fletcher, Melvin Glover, and Clifton Chase.
- "Good Lovin'" contains portions of "Say It Loud – I'm Black and I'm Proud", written by James Brown and Alfred Ellis, and performed by James Brown.
- "Don't Leave Me" contains a sample from "A Dream" written by Bunny DeBarge, and performed by DeBarge.
- "I Wanna Be Your Man" contains portions of "Float On", written by James Mitchell, Arnold Ingram, and Marvin Willis.
- "Can't Get You (Out of My Mind)" contains a sample from "Maracas Beach", written by James Simmons, and performed by Grover Washington Jr.
- "The Lord Is Real (Time Will Reveal)" contains elements from "Time Will Reveal", written by Bunny DeBarge and El DeBarge.

== Personnel ==
Blackstreet

- Teddy Riley – vocals; arrangements, programming, and instruments (1–9, 11, 13, 15–17); mixing, executive producer
- Chauncey "Black" Hannibal – vocals, arrangements (1, 4–6, 8, 13), executive producer
- Mark L. Middleton – vocals
- Eric "E" Williams – vocals; arrangements, programming, and instruments (15)

Additional personnel

- Darryl Adams – additional vocals (19)
- Karen Anderson – additional vocals (19)
- Tony Brown – assistant engineer
- Shannon Cooper – additional vocals (19)
- Beverly Crowder – rap (15), additional vocals (15, 19)
- Shaquanna Elam – additional vocals (19)
- ELAN – additional vocals (19)
- Lamenga Ford – additional vocals (19)
- Serban Ghenea – engineer, mixing, instruments (13, 15), strings engineer (13)
- John Hanes – engineer, mixing
- Roosevelt "Bink" Harrell – programming (7)
- Wesley Hogges – arrangements, programming, and instruments (15)
- Jeremy Lubbock – string arrangements (13)
- Julius McKelvey – assistant engineer
- George Meyers – engineer, mixing
- Charlie Paakkari – assistant strings engineer (13)
- Frank "Nitty" Pimentel – arrangements and programming (2)
- Herb Powers – mastering
- David Reitzas – strings engineer (13)
- Tommy Sims – arrangements, programming, and instruments (17)
- Tim Smith – assistant engineer
- William "Skylz" Stewart – arrangements, programming, and instruments (3)
- Earl Thomas – assistant engineer
- Sprague Williams – arrangements, programming, and instruments (9), assistant engineer

== Charts ==
=== Weekly charts ===
Chart (1996–1997)	Peak position
Australian Albums (ARIA)	37
Belgian Albums (Ultratop Wallonia)	48
Canadian Albums (Billboard)	18
Dutch Albums (Album Top 100)	20
French Albums (SNEP)	39
German Albums (Offizielle Top 100)	47
New Zealand Albums (RMNZ)	32
Swedish Albums (Sverigetopplistan)	44
Swiss Albums (Schweizer Hitparade)	19
UK Albums (Official Charts)	26
UK R&B Albums (Official Charts)	5
US Billboard 200	3
US Top R&B/Hip-Hop Albums (Billboard)	3

=== Year-end charts ===
Chart (1996)	Position
US Billboard 200	87
US Top R&B/Hip-Hop Albums (Billboard)	17

Chart (1997)	Position
Dutch Albums (Album Top 100)	68
US Billboard 200	16
US Top R&B/Hip-Hop Albums (Billboard)	8

== Certifications ==
Region	Certification	Certified units/sales
Canada (Music Canada)	2× Platinum	200,000^{^}
France (SNEP)	Gold	100,000^{*}
Netherlands (NVPI)	Gold	50,000^{^}
United Kingdom (BPI)	Gold	100,000^{^}
United States (RIAA)	4× Platinum	4,000,000^{^}
^{*} Sales figures based on certification alone.^{^} Shipments figures based on certification alone.

== See also ==
- List of number-one R&B albums of 1996 (U.S.)
