= Girlfriend/Boyfriend =

Song by Blackstreet and Janet Jackson

Single by Blackstreet and Janet Jackson featuring Ja Rule and Eve

from the album Finally
- Released: 1999
- Genre: R&B; hip-hop
- Length: 4:03
- Label: Interscope
- Songwriters: C. Loving; E. Jeffers; J. Atkins; J. Cozier; Teddy Riley
- Producer: Teddy Riley

Blackstreet singles chronology
| "Take Me There" (1998) | "Girlfriend/Boyfriend" (1999) | "Get Ready" (1999) |

Janet Jackson singles chronology
| "What's It Gonna Be?!" (1999) | "Girlfriend/Boyfriend" (1999) | "Doesn't Really Matter" (2000) |

Eve singles chronology
| "You Got Me" (1999) | "Girlfriend/Boyfriend" (1999) | "Ruff Ryders' Anthem (Remix)" (1999) |

Ja Rule singles chronology
| "Kill 'Em All" (1999) | "Girlfriend/Boyfriend" (1999) | "Holla Holla (Remix)" (1999) |

Music video
- "Blackstreet - Girlfriend/Boyfriend ft. Janet Jackson" on YouTube

"Girlfriend/Boyfriend" is a song by American R&B group Blackstreet. It was released in 1999 as the second and final single from their third album Finally. Janet Jackson is also featured in the song as well as rappers Ja Rule and Eve. The song is co-written by R&B singer and Ja Rule's former associate Cynthia "Lil' Mo" Loving. It was a minor hit in the United States and achieved moderate success in some other countries.

== Background ==
Janet Jackson and Teddy Riley previously collaborated on the remix of Jackson's single "I Get Lonely" with Blackstreet in 1998. Later that year, MTV News reported Riley had worked with the Spice Girls on a new song, titled "Girlfriend, Boyfriend," for the soundtrack to the forthcoming film South Park: Bigger, Longer, Uncut. It is unknown if the Spice Girls actually recorded the song. The song was instead done with Janet Jackson, Ja Rule, and Eve for Blackstreet's own forthcoming album, Finally.

Jackson spoke favorably about the recording process, stating, "I really enjoyed working with [Teddy Riley]… It was a lot of fun in the studio. He reminds me of one of my brothers, and that's a good thing. That felt very good. So I'm sure we'll probably do something together in the future."

For the first time, Jackson included the song on her 2023 Together Again Tour.

== Critical reception ==
Billboard reviewed the song positively, commenting, "This wispy slice of hip-hop funk sounds like the first no-holds-barred pop/R&B anthem for the spring season," and calling it "of-the-moment, hip, and deliciously sexy." In The Baltimore Sun, J. D. Considine praised Riley and Jackson's chemistry, calling them "a pairing that adds extra heat to the tune's battle-of-the-sexes lyrics." The Washington Post noted the song's "choppy Timbaland-style beats."

== Music video ==
The accompanying music video for "Girlfriend/Boyfriend" was directed by Joseph Kahn. The music video had a budget of $1.5 million, causing VH1 to rank it 21st on its list of the 25 most expensive music videos ever made, published in 2013.

== Track listing ==
=== Japan 5" CD Single ===
1. Girlfriend/Boyfriend (House Mix) (6:34)
2. Girlfriend/Boyfriend (House Mix Instrumental) (6:34)
3. Girlfriend/Boyfriend (House Mix Acapella) (6:26)

=== U.S. 5" CD Single Remixes ===
1. Girlfriend/Boyfriend (Grand Jury Carson Main Radio Remix) (4:13)
2. Girlfriend/Boyfriend (Grand Jury Carson Rap Drop/Radio Fade) (4:12)
3. Girlfriend/Boyfriend (The Anthem Remix) (4:12)
4. Girlfriend/Boyfriend (Grand Jury Pasadena Remix) (4:38)

=== U.S. 12" Vinyl Maxi Single ===
1. Girlfriend/Boyfriend (LP Version) (4:05)
2. Girlfriend/Boyfriend (Radio Edit) (3:47)
3. Girlfriend/Boyfriend (Instrumental) (4:05)
4. Take Me There (Big Yam Remix) (3:19)
5. Take Me There (LP Version) (5:01)
6. Take Me There (Instrumental) (5:01)

== Charts ==
=== Weekly charts ===
Weekly chart performance for "Girlfriend/Boyfriend"
| Chart (1999) | Peak position |
|---|---|
| Australia (ARIA) | 16 |
| Belgium (Ultratip Bubbling Under Flanders) | 14 |
| Canada Top Singles (RPM) | 14 |
| Canada Dance/Urban (RPM) | 1 |
| Europe (European Hot 100 Singles) | 40 |
| France (SNEP) | 71 |
| Germany (GfK) | 98 |
| Netherlands (Dutch Top 40) | 33 |
| Netherlands (Single Top 100) | 41 |
| New Zealand (Recorded Music NZ) | 12 |
| Scottish Singles Sales (Official Charts) | 25 |
| Sweden (Sverigetopplistan) | 59 |
| UK Singles (Official Charts) | 11 |
| UK Hip Hop/R&B (Official Charts) | 5 |
| US Billboard Hot 100 | 47 |
| US Hot R&B/Hip-Hop Songs (Billboard) | 17 |
| US Rhythmic Airplay (Billboard) | 7 |

=== Year-end charts ===
Year-end chart performance for "Girlfriend/Boyfriend"
| Chart (1999) | Position |
|---|---|
| Canada Dance/Urban (RPM) | 7 |
| UK Singles (OCC) | 188 |
| UK Urban (Music Week) | 14 |

== Trivia ==
Despite being on the song and video together, Eve and Janet Jackson never met until Eve revealed on The Talk (which Eve then co-hosted) that she met Jackson for the first time at an after party early in her career where Jackson not only consoled her after someone spiked her drink but also (most likely) had her security team get the person in trouble for spiking Eve's drink.
