= Queen Pen =

American rapper

- Born: Lynise Walters; September 24, 1972 (age 53); Brooklyn, New York City, U.S.
- Genres: Hip-hop
- Occupations: Rapper; singer; songwriter
- Years active: 1994–present
- Labels: Lil' Man; Interscope; Motown
- Producer(s): Teddy Riley

Lynise Walters (born September 24, 1972), known professionally as Queen Pen, is an American rapper. Born in Brooklyn, New York City, she was discovered by producer Teddy Riley at an IHOP restaurant in Virginia Beach, Virginia. Riley later invited her to "spit lyrics" for Blackstreet's 1996 single "No Diggity", which became her and Riley's most successful recording (although she was uncredited on many publications of the song). Walters signed with Riley's Lil Man Records, an imprint of Interscope Records to release her debut album, My Melody (1997), which spawned the single, "All My Love" (featuring Eric Williams) peaking at number 28 on the Billboard Hot 100. The album contained production largely handled by Riley and writing contributions from fellow Brooklyn native Jay-Z.

Her second studio album, Conversations with Queen (2001) contained less involvement from both, and saw minimal critical or commercial response. She has not released any music afterward and has since become an author.

== Career ==
Her music career launched after she became a protégé of Teddy Riley, a producer and member of the R&B group Blackstreet in the mid-1990s. Although she was not listed on the song, she was a featured artist alongside Dr. Dre in Blackstreet's 1996 hit, "No Diggity". She signed to Riley's Lil' Man label and released My Melody (1997), her solo debut album, produced by Riley.

Her first album produced the charted singles "Man Behind the Music", "All My Love", and "Party Ain't a Party". She also gained notoriety for her song "Girlfriend" (featuring Meshell Ndegeocello), where the lyrics explored same sex relationships. In 1999, she took a three-year hiatus from performing and returned with her second album, Conversations with Queen (2001).

== Personal life ==
After the release of the single "Girlfriend", which contained themes that were taboo in the hip-hop community at the time, some media sources presumed Queen Pen to be bisexual or a lesbian. During the song's release, Queen Pen remained coy about her sexuality and would not disclose it unless it was going to be a "front page" story. She added that if she told the press she was straight, she would be viewed as a liar; in turn, if she were to say she was gay, she would be viewed as someone trying to get publicity. In 2001, Queen Pen disclosed in an interview that she was neither bisexual nor lesbian. She is now an entrepreneur and novelist. Her sons Donlynn and Quintion are also rappers, who go by the handles Nefu Da Don and Q Nhannaz, respectively.

=== Feud with Foxy Brown ===
In 1998, a dispute between Foxy Brown and Queen Pen developed over her controversial lesbian-themed single "Girlfriend". Brown, who took offense to the song's subject, spewed homophobic remarks at both Pen and former rival Queen Latifah via her diss track "10% Dis". In response, Pen reportedly confronted Brown while barefoot in the lobby of Nevada's Reno Hilton during the Impact Music Convention and tried to slap her and chase her down an elevator. The fight was broken up by producer Derek "DC" Clark and Brown's associates Noreaga and Cam'ron. Later, Queen Pen happened upon Foxy Brown again when Brown was accompanied by ex-lover Kurupt. Again, the conflict was subdued before any further physical contact occurred.

In late 1998, Brown released another diss track titled "Talk to Me", which contained more homophobic remarks directed at Pen and Queen Latifah. In 2001, Pen responded to the diss track with her record "I Got Cha", in which Queen Pen called Brown a "bum bitch", and later made remarks about her being funny and fake "like a drag queen". Although Queen Pen insisted the song was not about Brown, she responded in an MTV interview: "You make a record about me, I make a record about you. Sooner or later I'm going to have to punch you in your face." Shortly after the track's release, the feud began to die down, and by July 2006, Pen and Brown reconciled at Russell Simmons' Hip-Hop Summit.

== Novels ==
- Situations: A Book of Short Stories (2002)
- Blossom: A Novel (2007)

== Discography ==
=== Albums ===
- My Melody (1997)
- Conversations with Queen (2001)

=== Singles ===
- "Man Behind the Music" (1997)
- "All My Love" (1998)
- "Party Ain't a Party" (1998)
- "It's True" (1998)
- "I Got Cha" (2001)
