= No Diggity =

1996 single by Blackstreet

Single by Blackstreet featuring Dr. Dre and Queen Pen

from the album Another Level
- B-side: "Billie Jean" (remix)
- Released: July 29, 1996
- Recorded: 1996
- Genre: R&B; hip-hop; hip-hop soul
- Length: 5:04
- Label: Interscope
- Songwriters: Teddy Riley; Andre Young; Lynise Walters; William Stewart; Bill Withers; Richard Vick; Chauncey Hannibal
- Producers: Teddy Riley; William "Skylz" Stewart; Dr. Dre

Blackstreet singles chronology
"Tonight's the Night" (1995)	"No Diggity" (1996)	"Get Me Home" (1996)

Dr. Dre singles chronology
"California Love" (1995)	"No Diggity" (1996)	"Been There, Done That" (1996)

Queen Pen singles chronology
"No Diggity" (1996)	"Man Behind the Music" (1997)

Music video
- "No Diggity" on YouTube

"No Diggity" is a song by American R&B group Blackstreet featuring American rappers Dr. Dre and Queen Pen, serving as the first single from their second studio album, Another Level (1996). The song includes samples from Bill Withers's "Grandma's Hands". "No Diggity" was released by Interscope Records on July 29, 1996, and reached number one in the United States, Iceland, and New Zealand. In the US, "No Diggity" was the final number-one single on Cash Box magazine's Top 100 Pop Singles chart.

"No Diggity" sold 1.6 million copies in 1996 and won the 1998 Grammy Award for Best R&B Performance by a Duo or Group with Vocals. The music video for the song was directed by Hype Williams. The track ranked at number 91 on Rolling Stone and MTV's "100 Greatest Pop Songs." It was also placed at number 32 on VH1's "100 Greatest Songs of the '90s", number 407 on Q Magazine's "1001 Best Songs Ever", number 33 on Blender's "Greatest Songs Since You Were Born", and number 43 on NME's "100 Best Songs of the 1990s".

== Background ==
At Future Records Recording Studios, Teddy Riley's former studio in Virginia Beach, Virginia, Riley encountered William "Skylz" Stewart experimenting with a sample of "Grandma's Hands" by Bill Withers. Riley insisted that Stewart provide him with the sample. Riley originally offered the song to Guy as part of their brief reunion in 1996. After failing to record any material, he suggested the song to Guy's lead singer Aaron Hall, who declined to participate in the recording. Subsequently, he offered the song to his other group, Blackstreet. In a 2010 interview, Riley revealed that the song was initially a hard sell among group members. He stated:

"None of the guys liked 'No Diggity.' None of them. They would even say it. That's why I'm singing the first verse. You know how they say they pushed the little one out there to see if it tastes good and see if he would get egged? Well, they pushed me out there – and it became a hit. And now they wish they were singing the first verse so that they could have the notoriety like me. So they trust what I'm saying..."

Upon the release of the finished recording by Blackstreet, Tupac and Death Row responded with a diss track called "Toss It Up" containing numerous insults aimed at Dr. Dre, set to an instrumental sampling "No Diggity." However, they were forced to replace the production after Blackstreet issued the label a cease and desist order, preventing them from distributing the song. An updated version of this response, "Toss It Up," would be released under his Makaveli alias just days after his death, featuring Aaron Hall.

== Content ==
The song's musical backing track features an altered sample from the beginning of "Grandma's Hands" by R&B singer Bill Withers. Dr. Dre's opening rap of the song finishes with "The original rump shakers" referencing Teddy Riley's other group Wreckx-n-Effect's 1992 song "Rump Shaker".

== Critical reception ==
Larry Flick from Billboard magazine wrote, "Finally honing his Boz Scaggs-like vocal style, [Teddy] Riley utilizes his infallible production and recent free agent Dr. Dre to ensure the single's add to several radio formats, as well as club and personal boombox playlists." He added, "As always, other BLACKstreet members perform superbly." James Bernard from Entertainment Weekly felt that "beatwise, it struts confidently, accompanied by a light keyboard action. Voices, including guest Dr. Dre's, croon and rap with a sexual urgency notable even by today's standards." A reviewer from Knight Ridder described it as an "uptempo excursion" and a "pointed, post-hip-hop strut." Connie Johnson from Los Angeles Times felt "No Diggity" "is definitely one of this year's most delectable dance releases."

Tony Farsides from Music Week's RM Dance Update gave the song a score of four out of five, commenting, "A real grower which is already popular in the clubs, the song features Blackstreet's trademark harmonies interspersed with rap and a killer grand piano sample following the chorus. Unlikely to cross over but a good bet for R&B fans and the lower reaches of the charts." Malaysian New Straits Times stated that sampling Bill Withers's bluesy "Grandma's Hands" and fitting it with a swingbeat base "instantly transforms the song into a hip-hop masterpiece of unimaginable brilliance." Jon Pareles from New York Times noted that the track uses a spiky Bill Withers guitar lick and features a rap by Dr. Dre, who promises that listeners will be "giving up eargasms with my mellow accent."

People Magazine's reviewer stated that "by combining R&B vocals with hip hop's aggressive beats," "that powerful one-two punch flavors 'No Diggity,' which takes a nasty Delta blues riff and marries it to lip-smacking lasciviousness. The result is an instant, five-minute pop classic." David Fricke from Rolling Stone felt that "when Blackstreet drop the bomb, though, you feel it. The guttural piano riff [...] is a kick that will not quit." Michael A. Gonzales for Vibe wrote that "with a mellow D-Funk rap intro from Dr. Dre, this track pumps like a Lexus roaring down 125th Street as the Harlem neighborhood hotties look on with glee. 'I can't get her outta my mind / I think about the girl all the time', Teddy whines about his object of desire, over haunting keyboards and astonishingly bouncy, minimalist production."

== Music video ==
The accompanying music video for the song is directed by American director Hype Williams and features Blackstreet members in front of a beach house standing in the sand; dancers on a wet road in front of black limousines; and marionettes throughout the video playing the piano sample, on guitar, and as a couple of replicas of the band members, respectively. The music video was released for the week ending on August 11, 1996.

== Impact and legacy ==
Bill Lamb from About.com complimented the song as "the peak of the work" created by Teddy Riley, "a key architect of new jack swing. 'No Diggity' is that genre fully refined." Tom Ewing of Freaky Trigger remarked that the song "is first of all capitalism in its slinkiest form, in every sense classy. A hymn to money, sex, upward mobility, 'No Diggity' triumphs over every other swingbeat anthem because it walks it so much like it talks it." NME called it "such a classy concoction of urban swagger and classic R&B." Q Magazine ranked it number 407 in their list of "1001 Best Songs Ever" in 2003. Blender listed "No Diggity" number 33 on their ranking of "Greatest Songs Since You Were Born" in 2005. Slant Magazine listed the song number 15 in their ranking of "The 100 Best Singles of the 1990s" in 2011. NME placed it number 43 on their "100 Best Songs of the 1990s" list in 2012.

Polish Porcys listed the song number 80 in their ranking of "100 Singles 1990-1999" in 2012, noting that it "probably [is] Riley's most perfect pop moment." Rolling Stone included "No Diggity" in their lists of "50 Best Songs of the Nineties" and "500 Best Songs of All Time" in 2019 and 2021 at numbers two and 424. VH1 put it on number 32 in their list of "100 Greatest Songs of the '90s". Billboard magazine ranked it number 91 in their "500 Best Pop Songs of All Time" in October 2023, saying, "No song sounded like it at the time, and no song has re-captured its full effect since." In 2024, Esquire ranked "No Diggity" number 28 in their "The 50 Best Songs of the ’90s".

== Track listings ==
- US CD and cassette single
1. "No Diggity" (LP version) – 5:03
2. "Billie Jean" (remix) – 5:01
- US maxi-CD and maxi-cassette single
1. "No Diggity" (LP version) – 5:03
2. "No Diggity" ("All-Star" remix) – 4:44
3. "No Diggity" ("Will" remix) – 4:27
4. "Billie Jean" (remix) – 5:38
5. "No Diggity" (LP instrumental) – 4:44
- US 12-inch single

A1. "Billie Jean" (remix) – 5:38
A2. "Billie Jean" (instrumental) – 5:38
A3. "No Diggity" ("Will" remix) – 4:26
B1. "No Diggity" ("All-Star" remix) – 4:44
B2. "No Diggity" ("All-Star" remix instrumental) – 4:44
B3. "No Diggity" (a cappella) – 4:42

- European CD single
1. "No Diggity" (radio edit) – 4:11
2. "No Diggity" (album version) – 5:03
- UK CD single
1. "No Diggity" (radio version)
2. "No Diggity" (album version)
3. "No Diggity" (All-Star remix)
4. "No Diggity" (Billie Jean remix)
5. "No Diggity" (Will remix)
- UK 12-inch single

A1. "No Diggity" (album version)
A2. "No Diggity" (All-Star remix)
B1. "No Diggity" (Billie Jean remix)
B2. "No Diggity" (Will remix)

- UK cassette single
1. "No Diggity" (album version)
2. "No Diggity" (Billie Jean remix)
- Australian CD single
1. "No Diggity" (LP version)
2. "No Diggity" (clean version)
3. "No Diggity" (Billie Jean remix)
4. "No Diggity" (All-Star remix)
5. "No Diggity" (instrumental)

== Charts ==
=== Weekly charts ===
Chart (1996–1997)	Peak position
Australia (ARIA)	21
Austria (Ö3 Austria Top 40)	16
Belgium (Ultratop 50 Flanders)	10
Belgium (Ultratop 50 Wallonia)	9
Canada (Nielsen SoundScan)	2
Canada Dance/Urban (RPM)	1
Denmark (IFPI)	2
Europe (Eurochart Hot 100)	18
Europe (European Dance Radio)	9
Europe (European Hit Radio)	26
France (SNEP)	25
Germany (GfK)	14
Iceland (Íslenski Listinn Topp 40)	1
Ireland (IRMA)	10
Israel (IBA)	7
Netherlands (Dutch Top 40)	4
Netherlands (Single Top 100)	7
New Zealand (Recorded Music NZ)	1
Norway (VG-lista)	5
Scottish Singles Sales (Official Charts)	23
Sweden (Sverigetopplistan)	3
Sweden (Swedish Dance Chart)	1
Switzerland (Schweizer Hitparade)	11
UK Singles (Official Charts)	9
UK Dance (Official Charts)	1
UK Hip Hop/R&B (Official Charts)	2
US Billboard Hot 100	1
US Hot R&B/Hip-Hop Songs (Billboard)	1
US Dance Singles Sales (Billboard)	1
US Rhythmic Airplay (Billboard)	1
US Pop Airplay (Billboard)	10
US Cash Box Top 100	1

Chart (2013)	Peak position
Ireland (IRMA)	26
Scottish Singles Sales (Official Charts)	45
UK Singles (Official Charts)	38
UK Hip Hop/R&B (Official Charts)	14

=== Year-end charts ===
Chart (1996)	Position
Brazil (Crowley)	82
Canada Dance/Urban (RPM)	22
Iceland (Íslenski Listinn Topp 40)	42
Israel (IBA)	96
Netherlands (Dutch Top 40)	30
Netherlands (Single Top 100)	52
New Zealand (RIANZ)	40
Sweden (Topplistan)	30
Sweden (Swedish Dance Chart)	5
US Billboard Hot 100	42
US Hot R&B Singles (Billboard)	29
US Maxi-Singles Sales (Billboard)	25
US Top 40/Rhythm-Crossover (Billboard)	31

Chart (1997)	Position
Australia (ARIA)	63
Belgium (Ultratop 50 Wallonia)	46
Europe (Eurochart Hot 100)	65
France (SNEP)	100
Romania (Romanian Top 100)	47
Switzerland (Schweizer Hitparade)	42
US Billboard Hot 100	23
US Hot R&B Singles (Billboard)	43
US Rhythmic Top 40 (Billboard)	9
US Top 40/Mainstream (Billboard)	36

Chart (2013)	Position
UK Singles (OCC)	154

=== Decade-end charts ===
Chart (1990–1999)	Position
US Billboard Hot 100	36

== Certifications ==
Region	Certification	Certified units/sales
Australia (ARIA)	Gold	35,000^{^}
Denmark (IFPI Danmark)	Platinum	90,000^{‡}
Germany (BVMI)	Gold	250,000^{‡}
New Zealand (RMNZ)	6× Platinum	180,000^{‡}
Norway (IFPI Norway)	Gold	
Sweden (GLF)	Gold	25,000^{^}
United Kingdom (BPI)	4× Platinum	2,400,000^{‡}
United States (RIAA)	Platinum	1,600,000
^{^} Shipments figures based on certification alone.^{‡} Sales+streaming figures based on certification alone.

== Release history ==
Region	Date	Format(s)	Label(s)	Ref.
United States	July 23, 1996	Promotional 12-inch vinyl	Interscope	
United States	July 29, 1996	Rhythmic contemporary radio	Interscope	
United States	October 1, 1996	12-inch vinyl; CD; cassette	Interscope	
United Kingdom	October 7, 1996	12-inch vinyl; CD; cassette	MCA; Interscope	
Japan	February 21, 1997	CD	Universal Music Japan	

== Lucas & Steve version ==
In 2021, Blackstreet re-recorded their vocals for a house version of "No Diggity" in collaboration with Dutch DJ duo Lucas & Steve, released via Spinnin' Records. This version brought a fresh, modern twist to the classic hit, blending Blackstreet's iconic vocals with Lucas & Steve's energetic house music style.

Weekly chart performance for "No Diggity"
Chart (2021)	Peak position
Netherlands (Single Top 100)	83
Belgium (Ultratip Bubbling Under Flanders)	47

== Cover versions ==
- Washington State produced a cover version titled "Dog Doogity," encouraging dog owners to pick up their pets' waste.
- Chicago's J.C. Brooks & The Uptown Sound performed a version of the song in June 2013 for The A.V. Club's A.V. Undercover series.
- Chet Faker rose to prominence after his cover of "No Diggity" went viral online, reaching number one on the Hypemachine chart in May 2011. He later included the cover on his debut EP Thinking in Textures. His version was later certified Platinum by Recorded Music NZ (RMNZ).
- Pitch Perfect included an a cappella version of the song in the Riff Off between the campus, started by Beca, played by Anna Kendrick
- The Cleverlys recorded a bluegrass comedic cover in 2018
