= Blackstreet =

American contemporary R&B group

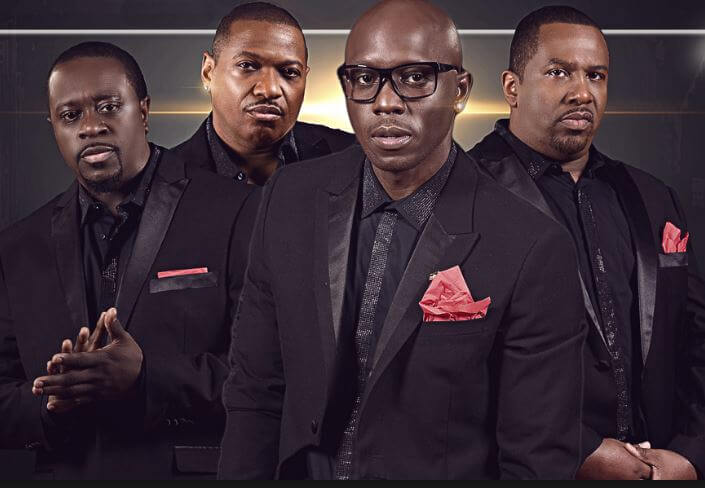

Background information
- Genre: R&B
- Works: Blackstreet discography
- Years active: 1991–present
- Labels: Interscope; DreamWorks; XOXO
- Members: Chauncey "Black" Hannibal; Levi Little; Mark Middleton; Eric Williams
- Past members: Teddy Riley; Dave Hollister; Joseph Stonestreet (deceased); Terrell Phillips
- Website: www.blackstreetofficial.com

Logo
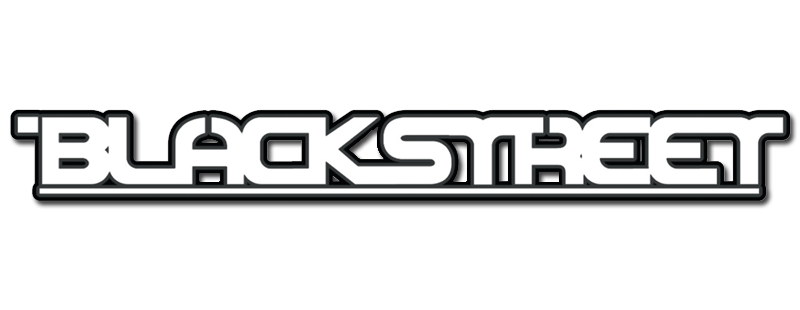

Blackstreet (often stylized as BLACKstreet) is an American R&B group founded in 1991 by Virginia Beach, Virginia-based record producers Chauncey "Black" Hannibal, Joseph "Street" Stonestreet, and Teddy Riley. The group released four albums with Interscope Records between 1994 and 2003. They achieved moderate commercial success leading up to their 1996 single "No Diggity" (featuring Dr. Dre and Queen Pen), which peaked atop the Billboard Hot 100 for four weeks.

In 2025, Jeff Mezydlo of Yardbarker included the band in his list of "20 underrated bands from the 1990s who are worth rediscovering".

== History ==
Their debut album, Blackstreet, featured the hit singles "Baby Be Mine" "Booti Call", "Before I Let You Go" and "Joy". "Baby Be Mine", "Booti Call" and "Before I Let You Go" were all Top 40 hits, with "Before I Let You Go" hitting the Top 10. In 1996, they released their second album Another Level. It was a breakthrough success due to the top single "No Diggity" (with Dr. Dre), which was a No. 1 hit on the Billboard Hot 100 in November 1996. In 1998, Blackstreet won the Grammy Award for Best R&B Performance by a Duo or Group with Vocals.

Another Level eventually went four times platinum in the United States and peaked at No. 3 on the Billboard chart. "No Diggity" was later ranked at No. 91 on Rolling Stone and MTV: 100 Greatest Pop Songs. Another Level featured Mark Middleton and Eric Williams in place of Dave Hollister and Levi Little. Both Middleton and Williams were in groups prior to joining Blackstreet. Middleton was part of the short-lived Motown Records group Brik Citi. Williams was part of the trio The Flex, a group that sang on songs produced by their mentor Marley Marl. The success of Another Level landed them a guest appearance on Jay-Z's "The City Is Mine" and they teamed with Mýa and Mase for the hit "Take Me There" from the Rugrats soundtrack. The success of Another Level would also land them a spot on New Edition's 1997 Home Again reunion tour.

Blackstreet had a top ten album with Finally. The first single from the album, "Girlfriend/Boyfriend", was a collaboration with Janet Jackson featuring Ja Rule and Eve. "Riley recorded a reunion album with Guy in 2000 and subsequently began working on material for his first solo record. However, he had second thoughts about disbanding Blackstreet and patched things up with Hannibal. Middleton and Williams returned to restore the Another Level lineup, and Riley's solo project became a Blackstreet reunion." After rumors of legal action and a preemptive countersuit, the group re-banded and released Level II in 2003.

=== Later years ===
After several failed attempts to keep Blackstreet together, all members eventually continued with solo careers for a time. However, in 2014, it was announced that past members Black, Little, Middleton, and Williams were back together under the Blackstreet moniker. They continue to perform with this lineup currently, and embarked on their second Australian tour in April 2015.

In 2015, Middleton and Williams were backing vocalists for Eurovision Song Contest 2015 North Macedonia's entry "Autumn Leaves" performed by Daniel Kajmakoski.

Joseph Stonestreet died of congestive heart failure on June 25, 2018 at the age of 56.

== Members ==
=== Current ===
- Chauncey "Black" Hannibal (1991–2005, 2007–present)
- Levi Little (1992–1995, 2005–2006, 2014–present)
- Mark Middleton (1996–1998, 2002–2011, 2014–present)
- Eric Williams (1996–1999, 2002–2011, 2014–present)

=== Former ===
- Joseph "Street" Stonestreet (1991–1994; died 2018)
- Teddy Riley (1992–2016)
- Dave Hollister (1994–1996, 2009–2016)
- Terrell Phillips (1998–1999)

== Discography ==
- Blackstreet (1994)
- Another Level (1996)
- Finally (1999)
- Level II (2003)
