= Teddy Riley =

American record producer (born 1967)

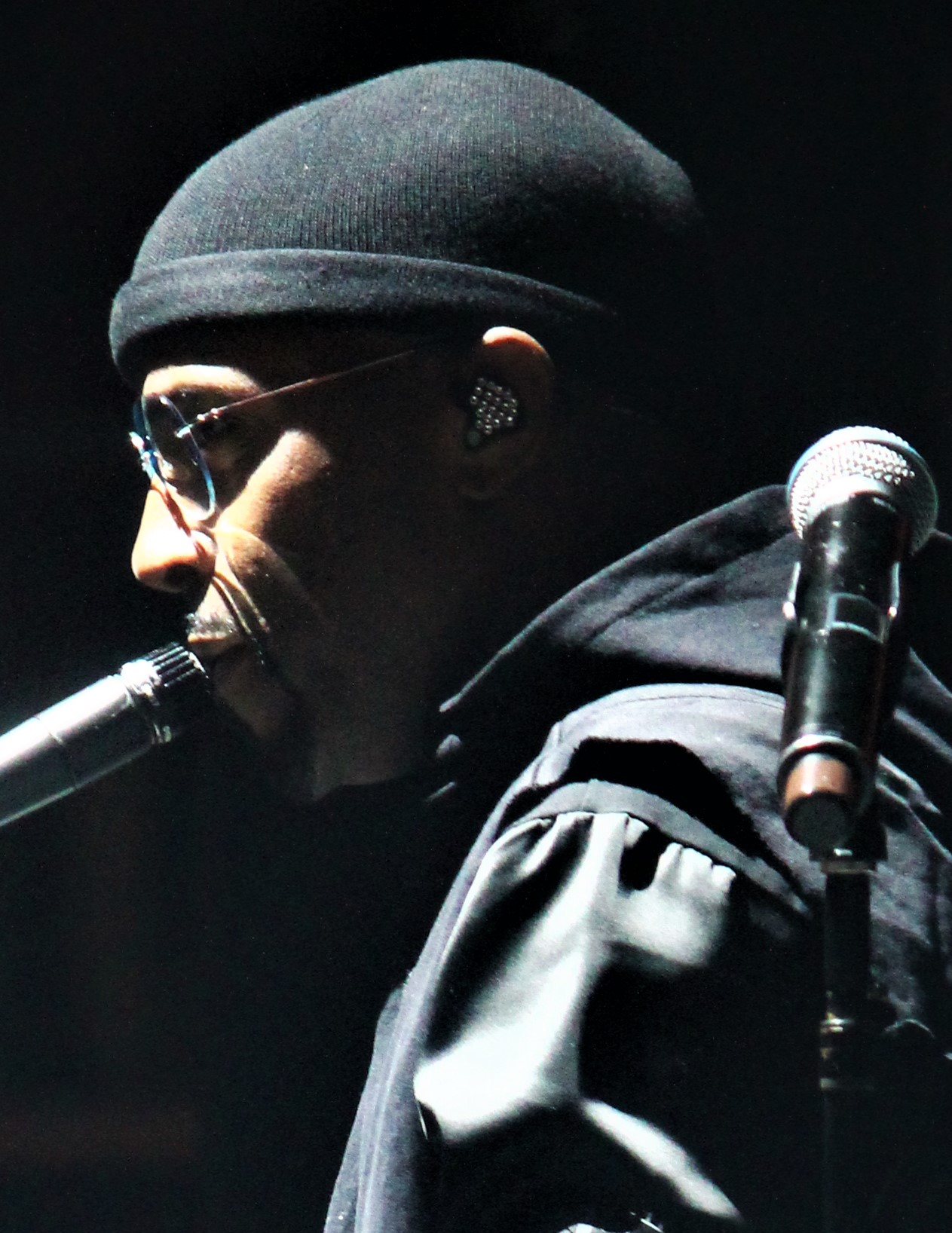
- Riley in 2017

Background information
- Also known as: Lil Man; Street; Swingbeat; The Finisher; Jam
- Born: Edward Theodore Riley; October 8, 1967 (age 59); Manhattan, New York City, U.S.
- Genres: R&B; hip-hop; new jack swing
- Occupations: Record producer; songwriter; singer
- Years active: 1984–present
- Labels: Interscope; Uptown; MCA; Lil Man; DreamWorks
- Member of: QDT; Guy; Wreckx-n-Effect
- Formerly of: Blackstreet
- Children: 9
- Website: teddyriley.com

Edward Theodore Riley (born October 8, 1967) is an American record producer and songwriter credited with the creation of new jack swing, a hip-hop and R&B fusion genre. Musical artists who utilized Riley's production and songwriting — namely Michael Jackson, Bobby Brown, Heavy D & the Boyz, Keith Sweat, Hi-Five, RaNia, and the Jacksons, among others — helped popularize the genre with several hit songs and albums from the late 1980s to 1990s. He is the founder and original member of the musical group Blackstreet, as well as its predecessor Guy.

With Blackstreet and Guy, Riley has released four and three commercially successful studio albums, respectively. He has produced four Billboard Hot 100 number one singles: "I Like the Way (The Kissing Game)" by Hi-Five, "Stutter" by Joe, "My Prerogative" by Bobby Brown, and "No Diggity" (featuring Dr. Dre and Queen Pen) by his group, Blackstreet. His other productions include the 1992 singles "Remember the Time" by Michael Jackson and "Right Here (Human Nature Remix)" by SWV. Beginning with his work on the extended play Teddy Riley, the First Expansion In Asia (2011), Riley has since worked on releases in the Eastern pop market, having produced the singles "Call Me Baby" for Exo in 2015, "The Boys" for Girls' Generation in 2011, and "Mamacita" for Super Junior in 2014.

A two-time Grammy Award winner, Riley's influence on contemporary R&B production had led to further usage of samples, sound effects, and rapping segments as well as singing — a practice which in part was reminiscent of the Jackson family. He is also credited with popularizing modern use of the talk box vocoder, and discovering Pharrell Williams in 1991.

== Early life ==
Riley was raised in St. Nicholas Houses in Harlem, New York City. A child prodigy from the age of five, he began playing instruments in church. His uncle, who owned the Harlem club The Rooftop, built a studio in the club in which Riley would spend most of his time while growing up. By age 15, he was beginning to work with artists like Doug E. Fresh.

== Career ==
Under the guidance of local music producer Gene Griffin, Riley formed the short-lived group Kids at Work. At the age of 18, Riley produced Kool Moe Dee's 12" single "Go See the Doctor". Released on an independent label in 1986, the song became a crossover hit, reaching number 89 on the Billboard Hot 100. Riley had previously worked on the production of Doug E. Fresh and the Get Fresh Crew's "The Show" in 1985.

In 1987, Riley, Aaron Hall, and Timmy Gatling formed the R&B group Guy. In 1989, Riley produced Big Daddy Kane's "I Get the Job Done", as well as other work for the Jacksons, the Winans, and James Ingram. That same year, he helped produce the debut album Wrecks-n-Effect of his rap group, Wreckx-n-Effect.

After the release and tour of Guy's second album, The Future, Riley co-produced half of Michael Jackson's album Dangerous on the recommendation of Jackson's long-time producer Quincy Jones. After the disbandment of Guy in 1992, Riley moved on to producing and promoting Wreckx-n-Effect's second album Hard or Smooth, which he also performed on.

In late 1991, Riley formed a second group, Blackstreet. The group would go on to release several major hits, including "Don't Leave Me" (1997), the number one single "No Diggity" (featuring Dr. Dre and Queen Pen) (1996), and "Girlfriend/Boyfriend" (with Janet Jackson featuring Ja Rule and Eve) (1999). By 2011, the group had disbanded and reformed several times.

In 2000, Riley worked with Spice Girl Melanie B on the tracks "ABC 123", "I Believe", and "Pack Your Shit" for her solo debut album Hot. He also worked on an album with Outsiderz 4 Life, producing "Wil' Out" and other songs.

At the start of 2006, he was part of the New Jack Reunion Tour, featuring Blackstreet and Guy, in addition to After 7, SWV, and Tony! Toni! Toné!. In May 2006, Riley announced that he would be working on two key projects: a new Blackstreet album and a new Guy album.

In 2008, Riley was the victim of a Ponzi scheme that left him bankrupt. In June 2008, a fire destroyed Riley's Virginia Beach recording studio. Fire investigators said that an electrical problem caused the blaze that burned the abandoned recording studio. The Virginia Beach Fire Department said lightning in the area also could have been a factor, although there was no direct strike. The empty studio was for sale and was insured for $336,000.

In 2009, Riley performed with Guy at the BET Awards. In the same year, Riley worked with Amerie and Robin Thicke on their respective albums. Leading on from his work on Snoop Dogg's album Ego Trippin', Riley became part of the production supergroup QDT, which features DJ Quik as well as Snoop Dogg.

Riley produced and co-wrote the song "Teeth" with Lady Gaga for her EP The Fame Monster. Speaking in March 2010 to Blues & Soul's Pete Lewis, Riley said that he was no longer affiliated with Guy (Riley had last performed with the group in October 2010). Riley also said that the current lineup of Blackstreet consisted of himself, Chauncey "Black" Hannibal, Dave Hollister, and Sherman "J-Stylz" Tisdale. He confirmed that he was working on a new Blackstreet album, though intended to release his own album – entitled TRX – first. Artists he could possibly be working with for the project included Stevie Wonder and Elton John, plus his own new, upcoming acts. However, Hannibal stopped performing with the group and the lineup became Riley, Hollister, Mark Middleton, and Eric Williams. In 2012, Hannibal returned to Blackstreet; Middleton and Williams left the group. As of 2019, the group's lineup now consists of Riley, Hollister, J-Stylz, and Rodney Poe under the name "Blackstreet 2".

In August 2010, co-executor of the Michael Jackson estate, John Branca, confirmed that a posthumous album from Jackson would be released, containing work done in the previous five years with producers Theron "Neff-U" Feemster, Christopher "Tricky" Stewart, and Riley, as well as work written and produced solely by Jackson himself. The album Michael was released on December 14, 2010, in the United States. After the release, several people questioned some of the music Riley produced for the project. Riley insisted all of the songs were sung by Jackson and claimed that vocal artifacts were added from overprocessing Jackson's voice. However, Riley made comments in an interview with Dan Dodds (also known as Soul Jones) in which he stated that there were some elements of his voice in the music. Riley is reported to have said, "They may use some elements from me, put together ideas but I haven't been working on the new album."

Recently, Riley has stepped into the Korean music market. Riley worked with rapper Jay Park on an English track titled "Demon", which was originally meant for Michael Jackson. Riley produced a mini-album for the girl group Rania.

He produced the tracks "Believe" and "Flow" by the R&B group Boyz II Men for the album Twenty. He has also produced Korean girl group Girls' Generation's single "The Boys" for the group's first international release. He has also produced songs for Girls' Generation's labelmates Shinee and Exo. He worked with Shinee on "Beautiful", "Shine", and "Dangerous" from their two-part third studio album The Misconceptions of Us. Riley also produced the songs "Milk" and "All Night" for f(x)'s third studio album Red Light and the song "What Is Love" for Exo.

== Personal life ==
As of 2025, Riley has nine children.

== Discography ==
With Kids at Work

- Kids at Work (1984)

With Guy

- Guy (1988)
- The Future (1990)
- Guy III (2000)

With Blackstreet

- Blackstreet (1994)
- Another Level (1996)
- Finally (1999)
- Level II (2003)

== Production discography ==
=== Production credits ===
Title	Year	Artist	Album
"It Isn't, It Wasn't, It Ain't Never Gonna Be (TR Remix)"	1989	Aretha Franklin, Whitney Houston	Non-album single
I Get the Job Done	1989	Big Daddy Kane	It's a Big Daddy Thing
"Now That We Found Love"; "Is It Good to You?"	1991	Heavy D & the Boyz	Peaceful Journey
Is It Good to You	1991	Teddy Riley, Tammy Lucas	Juice (soundtrack)
"Funke Wisdom"; "To da Beat Y'all"; "How Cool Can One Black Man Be?"; "Mo Better"; "Death Blow"	1991	Kool Moe Dee	Funke, Funke Wisdom
"Remember the Time"	1991	Michael Jackson	Dangerous
"Ready or Not (House Party II New Jack Theme)"	1991	Wreckx-n-Effect	House Party 2 (soundtrack)
"Right Here (Human Nature Mix)"	1992	SWV	Non-album single
"Baby Be Mine"	1993	Blackstreet	CB4 (soundtrack)
"69"; "Once She Gets Pumping"	1993	Father MC	Sex Is Law
"I'm Looking for the One (to Be with Me) {produced with DJ Jazzy Jeff}	1993	DJ Jazzy Jeff & the Fresh Prince	Code Red
"Something for Your Head"; "Fly Away"	1994	Tom Jones	The Lead and How to Swing It
"You Got the Flavor"; "Girls"; "Never Let You Go"	1994	New Kids on the Block	Face the Music
"All This Love"; "This Word Is All"	1994	Patti LaBelle	Gems
"This Is Your Night"	1994	Heavy D & the Boyz	Nuttin' but Love
"Don't Stop"	1994	MC Hammer	The Funky Headhunter
"I Want You Back"; "Something About"	1995	Pure Soul	Pure Soul
"Summer Bunnies (Loverman's Picnic Mix)"	1995	R. Kelly	—N/a
"Show You the Way to Go"	1995	Men of Vizion	Money Train (soundtrack)
"Black Cinderella"	1996	Positive K	Non-album single
"Coming Home to You"	1996	Blackstreet	Get on the Bus (soundtrack)
"Get Me Home" {produced with Trackmasterz)	1996	Foxy Brown	Ill Na Na
"Step by Step (TR Remix)"	1996	Whitney Houston	Non-album single
"Party & Bulls***"; "Figadoh"	2001	Method Man; Benzino	Rush Hour 2 (soundtrack)

== See also ==
- List of people from Harlem
