= Mase discography =

- Studio albums: 3
- Mixtapes: 2
- Singles: 22

American rapper Mase has released three studio albums, two mixtapes and twenty-two singles, including ten as a featured artist.

== Albums ==
=== Studio albums ===
List of albums, with selected chart positions and certifications
| Title | Album details | Peak chart positions | | | | | | | | | | Certifications |
| Title | Album details | US | US R&B | AUS | CAN | FRA | GER | NL | NZ | SWI | UK | Certifications |
|---|---|---|---|---|---|---|---|---|---|---|---|---|
| Harlem World | Released: October 28, 1997; Label: Bad Boy, Arista; Format: CD, LP, cassette, digital download | 1 | 1 | 91 | 1 | — | — | 59 | 20 | — | 53 | RIAA: 4× Platinum; MC: 3× Platinum; RMNZ: Gold |
| Double Up | Released: June 15, 1999; Label: Bad Boy, Arista; Format: CD, LP, cassette, digital download | 11 | 2 | 35 | 17 | — | 43 | 82 | — | — | 47 | RIAA: Gold; RMNZ: Gold |
| Welcome Back | Released: August 24, 2004; Label: Bad Boy, Universal; Format: CD, LP, cassette, digital download | 4 | 3 | 68 | 10 | 165 | 71 | — | 29 | 65 | 68 | RIAA: Gold |

== Singles ==
=== As lead artist ===
List of singles, with selected chart positions and certifications, showing year released and album name
| Title | Year | Peak chart positions | | | | | | | | | | Certifications | Album |
| Title | Year | US | US R&B | US Rap | AUS | CAN | GER | NL | NZ | SWI | UK | Certifications | Album |
|---|---|---|---|---|---|---|---|---|---|---|---|---|---|
| "Feel So Good" (featuring Kelly Price) | 1997 | 5 | 5 | 1 | 86 | 3 | — | 31 | 9 | — | 10 | RIAA: Platinum; RMNZ: Platinum | Harlem World |
| "What You Want" (featuring Total) | 1997 | 6 | 3 | 3 | — | 12 | 35 | — | 5 | — | 15 | RIAA: Gold; RMNZ: Platinum | Harlem World |
| "Lookin' at Me" (featuring Puff Daddy) | 1998 | 8 | 8 | 1 | — | 17 | — | — | 18 | — | — | RIAA: Gold | Harlem World |
| "Get Ready" (featuring Blackstreet) | 1999 | —^{[A]} | 50 | — | 23 | — | 86 | 41 | 10 | — | 25 | | Double Up |
| "All I Ever Wanted" (featuring Cheri Dennis) | 1999 | — | — | — | 88 | — | 94 | — | — | — | — | RMNZ: 2× Platinum | Double Up |
| "Welcome Back"^{[B]} | 2004 | 32 | 17 | 8 | — | — | 51 | — | 4 | 25 | 29 | RIAA: Gold; RMNZ: Platinum | Welcome Back |
| "Breathe, Stretch, Shake"^{[B]} (featuring P. Diddy) | 2004 | 28 | 12 | 7 | — | — | — | — | — | 41 | 29 | RIAA: Gold | Welcome Back |
| "Keep It On" | 2004 | — | — | — | — | — | — | — | — | — | — | | Welcome Back |
| "Get It" (featuring Cam'Ron and B. Rossi) | 2009 | — | — | — | — | — | — | — | — | — | — | | Non-album single |
| "Why Can't We" (featuring Her) | 2013 | — | — | — | — | — | — | — | — | — | — | | Now We Even |
| "Nothing" (featuring Eric Bellinger) | 2014 | — | — | — | — | — | — | — | — | — | — | | Now We Even |
"—" denotes a recording that did not chart or was not released in that territory.

=== As featured artist ===
List of singles, with selected chart positions and certifications, showing year released and album name
| Title | Year | Peak chart positions | | | | | | | | | | Certifications | Album |
| Title | Year | US | US R&B | US Rap | AUS | CAN | GER | NL | NZ | SWI | UK | Certifications | Album |
|---|---|---|---|---|---|---|---|---|---|---|---|---|---|
| "Only You" (Remix) (112 featuring Mase and the Notorious B.I.G.) | 1996 | 13 | 3 | — | — | — | — | — | 43 | — | — | RIAA: Gold; RMNZ: Gold | 112 |
| "Can't Nobody Hold Me Down" (Puff Daddy featuring Mase) | 1997 | 1 | 1 | 1 | 27 | 1 | 23 | 59 | 11 | 37 | 19 | RIAA: 2× Platinum | No Way Out |
| "Just the Way You Like It" (Tasha Holiday featuring Mase) | 1997 | 93 | 29 | — | — | — | — | — | — | — | — | | Just the Way You Like It |
| "Been Around the World" (Puff Daddy featuring Mase and the Notorious B.I.G.) | 1997 | 2 | 7 | 1 | 48 | 2 | 41 | 40 | 3 | 39 | 20 | RIAA: Platinum | No Way Out |
| "Mo Money Mo Problems" (The Notorious B.I.G. featuring Mase and Puff Daddy) | 1997 | 1 | 2 | 1 | 10 | 2 | 11 | 1 | 2 | 8 | 6 | RIAA: Platinum; ARIA: Gold; RMNZ: 3× Platinum | Life After Death |
| "Don't Know (Remix)" (Mario Winans featuring Allure & Mase) | 1997 | — | — | — | — | — | — | — | — | — | — | | Story of My Heart |
| "Honey" (remix) (Mariah Carey featuring Mase and the Lox) | 1997 | — | — | — | — | — | — | — | — | — | — | | Butterfly |
| "You Should Be Mine (Don't Waste Your Time)" (Brian McKnight featuring Mase) | 1997 | 17 | 4 | — | — | — | — | — | — | — | 36 | | Anytime |
| "Top of the World" (Brandy featuring Mase) | 1998 | — | — | — | 39 | 22 | 42 | 52 | 11 | 42 | 2 | BPI: Silver | Never Say Never |
| "Take Me There" (Blackstreet and Mýa featuring Mase and Blinky Blink) | 1998 | 14 | 10 | — | — | — | 58 | 22 | 1 | — | 7 | RIANZ: Platinum | The Rugrats Movie soundtrack and Finally |
| "Horse & Carriage" (Cam'ron featuring Mase) | 1998 | 41 | 9 | 9 | — | — | — | — | — | — | 12 | | Confessions of Fire |
| "Love Me" (112 featuring Mase) | 1998 | 17 | 8 | — | 67 | 17 | — | — | 33 | — | 196 | RIAA: Platinum | Room 112 |
| "I Really Like It" (Harlem World featuring Mase and Kelly Price) | 1999 | — | 61 | 31 | — | — | — | — | — | — | — | | The Movement |
| "Commas" (L.E.P. Bogus Boys featuring Lil Wayne and Mase) | 2013 | — | — | — | — | — | — | — | — | — | — | | Non-album single |
"—" denotes a recording that did not chart or was not released in that territory.

== Other charted and certified songs ==
List of songs, with selected chart positions, showing year released and album name
| Title | Year | Peak chart positions | | Certifications | Album |
| Title | Year | US R&B | US R&B Airplay | Certifications | Album |
|---|---|---|---|---|---|
| "24 Hrs. to Live" (featuring the Lox, Black Rob and DMX) | 1998 | — | 72 | | Harlem World |
| "Stay Out of My Way" | 1999 | —^{[C]} | — | | Double Up |
| "In My Life" (Nelly featuring Avery Storm And Mase) | 2004 | — | — | RMNZ: Gold | Suit |
"—" denotes a recording that did not chart or was not released in that territory.

== Other guest appearances ==
List of non-single guest appearances, with other performing artists, showing year released and album name
| Title | Year | Other artist(s) | Album |
|---|---|---|---|
| "Just a Touch (remix)" | 1997 | Keith Sweat | Keith Sweat |
| "Freestyle" | 1997 | Funkmaster Flex, Puffy | The Mix Tape, Vol. II |
| "The Body Rock" | 1997 | Busta Rhymes, Rampage, Puff Daddy | When Disaster Strikes... |
| "We Got It" | 1998 | Cam'ron | Confessions of Fire |
| "Niggaz Done Started Something" | 1998 | DMX, the Lox | It's Dark and Hell is Hot/Woo (Soundtrack) |
| "Danger Zone" | 1998 | McGruff, Big L | Destined to Be |
| "You Get Dealt Wit" | 1998 | Jermaine Dupri, Lil' Kim | Life in 1472 |
| "If You Want Me" | 1998 | Total | Kima, Keisha, and Pam |
| "Will They Die 4 U" | 1998 | System of a Down, Lil Kim, Puffy | Chef Aid: The South Park Album |
| "That's the Way" | 1998 | DJ Clue?, Fabolous, Foxy Brown | The Professional |
| "Crew of the Year" | 1999 | Harlem World | The Movement |
| "One Big Fiesta" | 1999 | Harlem World | The Movement |
| "Is It You? (Deja Vu)" (Remix) | 1999 | Made Men, Big Pun, Cardan | Classic Limited Edition |
| "That's What's Happenin'" | 1999 | The Madd Rapper, Tracey Lee & the Leonards | Tell 'Em Why U Madd |
| "Do What Playas Do" | 1999 | Mysonne, 8Ball | Violator: The Album |
| "Down the Line Joint" | 2000 | Black Rob, G-Dep, Mark Curry, Puff Daddy | Life Story |
| "Jesus Walks" (Remix) | 2004 | Kanye West, Common | —N/a |
| "In My Life" | 2004 | Nelly, Avery Storm | Suit |
| "I Don't Know Officer" | 2005 | Lloyd Banks, Spider Loc, 50 Cent, Prodigy | Get Rich or Die Tryin' |
| "300 Shots" | 2005 | G-Unit, M.O.P., Mobb Deep | G-Unit Radio Part 15: Are You A Window Shopper? |
| "Lean Back" | 2005 | Fat Joe, Eminem, Remy Ma, Lil Jon | All or Nothing |
| "Take A Picture" | 2005 | Lil Scrappy | Full Metal Jacket |
| "They Don't Bother Me" | 2007 | Young Buck, Spider Loc, 50 Cent | They Don't Bother Me |
| "Slight Work" (Remix) | 2012 | Wale, French Montana, Diddy | —N/a |
| "Young Harlem Nigga" | 2012 | CashFlow | The Enterprise |
| "Awkward Moment" | 2012 | Adrian Marcel | —N/a |
| "Higher" | 2012 | The-Dream, Pusha T, Cocaine 80s | Cruel Summer |
| "Grownups" | 2012 | French Montana, Rico Love | Mac & Cheese 3 |
| "Made It Through the Struggle" | 2013 | Young Scooter, Verse Simmonds | Street Lottery |
| "Beautiful Pain" | 2013 | 2 Chainz, Lloyd | B.O.A.T.S. II: Me Time |
| "Right Now" | 2013 | Meek Mill, French Montana, Cory Gunz | Dreamchasers 3 |
| "Tryna Wife" | 2014 | Jo'zzy, Timbaland | —N/a |
| "Supreme" (Remix) | 2014 | Rick Ross, Big K.R.I.T., Fabolous | —N/a |
| "Killin Em Girl" | 2016 | Slim | Re-Fueled |
| "$4,000,000" | 2017 | Steve Aoki, Bad Royale, Big Gigantic | Kolony |
| "Not a Love Song" | 2018 | Eric Bellinger | Eazy Call |
| "Gorilla Lion Hyena" | 2022 | Cam'ron, Jadakiss | —N/a |

== Notes ==
- A "Get Ready" did not enter the Billboard Hot 100, but peaked at number 25 on the Bubbling Under Hot 100 Singles chart, which acts as a 25-song extension to the Hot 100.
- B "Welcome Back" and "Breathe, Stretch, Shake" charted as a double A-side single in the United Kingdom.
- C "Stay Out of My Way" did not enter the Hot R&B/Hip-Hop Songs chart, but peaked at number 9 on the Bubbling Under R&B/Hip-Hop Singles chart, which acts as a 25-song extension to the Hot R&B/Hip-Hop Songs chart.
