= Stevie J production discography =

The following list is a discography of production by Stevie J

== 1995 ==
- Jodeci: "Fun 2 Nite", "S-More", from the album The Show, The After-Party, The Hotel
- Faith Evans: "Soon As I Get Home (Remix)"

== 1996 ==
- Soul For Real: "Where Do We Go", "Love You So" from the album For Life
- Horace Brown: "How Can We Stop", "I Want You Baby" from the album Horace Brown
- 112: "112 Intro", "Pleasure and Pain", "Come See Me Remix", "Sexy You Interlude", "I Can't Believe", "Only You Remix", "I Will Be There", "In Love With You", "Why Does", "Throw It All Away", "Only You" from the album 112
- Faith Evans: "I Just Can't" from High School High Original Soundtrack
- Lil' Kim: "No Time" from the album Hard Core
- Mona Lisa: "Just Wanna Please You" (Stevie J. Version)
- SWV: "You're the One" (Bad Boy Remix)
- MC Lyte: "Cold Rock A Party" (Bad Boy Remix)
- The Isley Brothers: "Floatin' on Your Love" (Bad Boy Remix), "Floatin' on Your Love"(Bad Boy Slow Remix)
- Babyface: "This Is for the Lover in You" (Puffy Combs Remix)
- Jesse Powell: "I Like It (Remix)"
- Chantay Savage: "I Will Survive" (Puffy Combs Bad Boy Remix)
- Tevin Campbell: "You Don't Have to Worry" from the album Back to the World
- New Edition and Missy Elliott: "You Don't Have to Worry (Vocal Version)"

== 1997 ==
- The Notorious B.I.G.: "Mo Money Mo Problems", "Niggas Bleed", "Notorious Thugs", "Another", and "Playa Hater" from the album Life After Death
- Mariah Carey: "Breakdown", "Honey", "Babydoll" from the album Butterfly
- Puff Daddy and the Family: "No Way Out (Intro)", "Victory", "Been Around the World", "Is This the End?", "Friend", "I'll Be Missing You", from the album No Way Out
- Simone Hines: "Yeah! Yeah! Yeah!" (Stevie J. Remix)
- Tasha Holiday: "Just the Way You Like It" from the album Just The Way You Like It
- Mase: "Love U So" from the album Harlem World
- Jay-Z: "Lucky Me" from the album In My Lifetime, Vol. 1
- KRS-One: "Step into a World / Rapture's Delight" (Bad Boy Remix) from the album I Got Next!
- Sting & The Police: "Roxanne '97"
- Barry White & Faith Evans: "My Everything" from Money Talks (soundtrack)
- Gina Thompson and Missy Elliott: "The Things You Do (Bad Boy Remix)"
- Total: "Kissin' You/Oh Honey" (Remix)
- Boyz II Men: "Can't Let Her Go", "To the Limit" from the album Evolution
- LL Cool J: "Don't Be Late, Don't Come Too Soon" from the album Phenomenon
- Frankie: "I Have Love" from the album My Heart Belongs to You
- Tha Truth: "Makin Moves" from Makin Moves... Everyday

== 1998 ==
- 112: "So Much Love Interlude", "Crazy Over You", "Never Mind" from the album Room 112
- Simply Red: "The Air I Breathe" from the album Blue
- The Lox: "Can't Stop Won't Stop" from the album Money, Power & Respect
- Cherrelle: "The Right Time"
- Deborah Cox: "September", "Love Is on the Way" from the album One Wish
- Kelly Price: "Friend of Mine" from the album Soul of a Woman
- Kurupt: "We Can Freak It (East Coast)" from the album Kuruption!
- Jay-Z: "Ride or Die" from the album Vol. 2... Hard Knock Life
- R. Kelly: "Spendin' Money" from the album R.
- Faith Evans: "Lately I" from the album Keep The Faith
- Tamia: "Falling For You" from the album Tamia
- Total: "If You Want Me", "What About Us?" (Bad Boy Remix) from the album Kima, Keisha, and Pam
- The Jacksons: "Want You Back" Remix from album Motown 40 Forever
- Brian McKnight: "You Should Be Mine (Don't Waste Your Time)" from the album Anytime
- 7 Mile: "Just A Memory", "After" from the album 7 Mile

== 1999 ==
- Mariah Carey: "I Still Believe" (Stevie J. Remix)
- Mariah Carey: "Theme From Mahogany (Do You Know Where You're Going To?)" from the #1's
- Tevin Campbell: "Another Way", "For Your Love", "My Love Ain't Blind", "Dandelion", "Losing All Control", "Siempre Estaras en Mi (Dandelion)" from the album Tevin Campbell
- Tyrese Gibson & Heavy D: "Criminal Mind" from the album Blue Streak (soundtrack)
- Notorious B.I.G.: "Would You Die For Me" from the album Born Again
- Dave Hollister: "My Favorite Girl" from the album Ghetto Hymns
- Saafir: "Watch How Daddy Ball!" from The Hit List

== 2000s ==
2001

- 112: "I Surrender," from the album Part III
- Mariah Carey: "Honey", "I Still Believe," from the album Greatest Hits
- Tyrese & Heavy D: "Criminal Mind," from Blue Streak Original Soundtrack
- Eve: "You Had Me, You Lost Me" and "Let Me Blow Ya Mind" from the album Scorpion

2003

- Mary J. Blige: "Love & Life Intro", "Love at First Sight", "Feel Like Making Love" from the album Love & Life
- 112: "Intro/Medley", "It's Going Down Tonight", "Hot and Wet", "Right Here for You", "Knock You Down Interlude", "Know You Down", "Hot and Wet Remix", "Give It To Me" from the album Hot & Wet
- Beyoncé: "Summertime" (co-producer, writer) from the soundtrack of The Fighting Temptations
- Snoop Dogg and Loon: "Gangsta Shit" from Bad Boys 2 Soundtrack

2004

- Carl Thomas: "Work It Out", "A Promise" from the album Let's Talk About It
- Eightball and MJG: "Shot Off", "Trying To Get at You", "Baby Girl" from the album Living Legends
- New Edition: "Been So Long" from the album One Love

2005

- B5: "Dance For You", "Let It Be", "No More Games" from the album B5
- Black Rob: "Y'all Know Who Killed Him" from the album The Black Rob Report
- The Notorious B.I.G: "Down for Whatever" from the album Duets: The Final Chapter
- Mary J Blige: Be Without You from the album The Breakthrough

2007

- Notorious B.I.G.: "Notorious Thugs" from Greatest Hits

2008

- Cheri Dennis: "Freak" from the album In and Out of Love

2009

- Day26: Forever in a Day

2011

- Bobby V: "Heaven (My Angel Part II)" (co-writing, co-production, guitar) from the album Fly on the Wall

2013

- TGT: "Hurry" (co-writing) from the album Three Kings

2014

- Rick Ross: "Nobody" from the album Mastermind

2015

- Puff Daddy and the Family: "You Could Be My Lover" from the album MMM (Money Making Mitch)

2017

- Faith Evans: "A Billion", "Legacy", "I Got Married (Interlude)", "We Just Clicked (Interlude)", "The Baddest (Interlude)", "It Was Worth It" from the album The King & I

2019

- Summer Walker: "Nobody Else" from the album Over It
