= Traci Bingham =

American actress and model (born 1968)

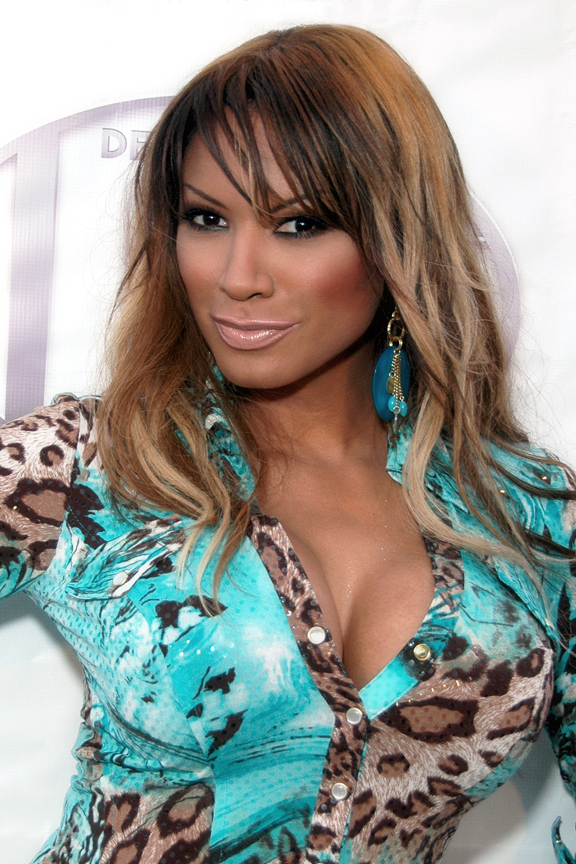
- Bingham in 2008
- Born: Julie Anne Smith; January 13, 1968 (age 58); North Cambridge, Massachusetts, U.S.
- Occupations: Actress; model; television personality
- Years active: 1991–present
- Known for: Jordan Tate – Baywatch
- Spouses: Finnian Lozada (divorced) Robb Vallier (m. 1998; div. 2001)

Traci A. Bingham (born January 13, 1968) is an American actress, model, and television personality. Beginning her professional career in the early 1990s, Bingham is best known for her role as Jordan Tate on the syndicated action drama television series Baywatch (1996–1998).

== Biography ==
=== Early life and education ===
Bingham was born Julie Anne Smith to an African American and Italian mother and a Native American father. She was the youngest of seven children born in North Cambridge, Massachusetts, to Betty, a librarian, and Lafayette Bingham, an aircraft technician who served in World War II. For high school, Bingham attended Cambridge Rindge and Latin School; graduating in 1986.

=== Career ===
Bingham began her career in minor acting roles. Aside from Baywatch, Bingham's appearances include the television series D.R.E.A.M. Team and Beverly Hills, 90210, and the film Demon Knight. She also played minor roles in the popular American sitcoms The Fresh Prince of Bel-Air and Married... with Children. In 1991, Bingham appeared in the video for "Good Vibrations" by Marky Mark and the Funky Bunch. Eight years later, she appeared in the video for "I Really Like It" by Harlem World featuring Mase and Kelly Price.

In June 1998, Bingham posed for a "Babes of Baywatch" pictorial in Playboy magazine. Bingham has appeared on a number of reality television programs. In 2004, she was in the second series of The Surreal Life. Her castmates included Ron Jeremy, Vanilla Ice, Erik Estrada, Tammy Faye Bakker, and Trishelle Cannatella. Two years later, she flew to England to appear in Celebrity Big Brother, where she made it to the final six contestants and was evicted on the final night of the show. She selected Families of SMA as the charity to receive a donation from her participation in the show because her niece had died from spinal muscular atrophy (SMA).

In 2005, Bingham was hired as a spokesmodel by Empire Poker, an online gambling site that ceased operations in 2006. In 2007, Bingham appeared on VH1's The Surreal Life: Fame Games and won the $100,000 grand prize. In 2008, Bingham appeared on Fox Reality's Gimme My Reality Show! competing with six other celebrities to get their own reality show. Bingham appeared on The 2008 World Magic Awards television show.

In 2014, A Massachusetts court issued an arrest warrant for Bingham after she failed to appear in court regarding a breached XXX adult contract in which she agreed "to pose for what is commonly referred to in erotica as a 'facial." A California Court entered a $180,000.00 judgment against Bingham. After taking the money, Bingham did not show up for the production.

=== Activism ===
Bingham is a vegetarian. In May 2002, she appeared in a vegetarian advertisement wearing a bikini made of lettuce, and in May 2006 she appeared nude in an ad as part of PETA's "I'd Rather Be Naked Than Wear Fur" campaign.

== Personal life ==
Bingham has been married twice and has no children. Her first husband was Finnian Lozada. From August 29, 1998, until January 18, 2001, Bingham was married to songwriter and musician Robb Vallier.

== Filmography ==
=== Film ===
| Year | Title | Role | Notes |
|---|---|---|---|
| 1995 | Demon Knight | Party Babe | |
| 1998 | Beach Movie | Julie | |
| 1999 | Foolish | Simone | |
| 1999 | D.R.E.A.M. Team | Victoria Carrera | TV movie |
| 2001 | The Private Public | Laina Brookhart | |
| 2001 | Longshot | Herself | |
| 2003 | Four Fingers of the Dragon | Herself | Short |
| 2003 | Malibooty! | Herself | Video |
| 2003 | Bad Bizness | Sandra Marshall | |
| 2006 | CC Variety TV | Herself | Short |
| 2008 | Hanging in Hedo | Cashmere | |
| 2010 | Black Widow | Lynda | |
| 2014 | Carolina Parakeet | Herself | Short |
| 2015 | East of Hollywood | Lindsay | Short |

=== Television ===
| Year | Title | Role | Notes |
|---|---|---|---|
| 1994 | The Fresh Prince of Bel-Air | Santa Helper | Episode: "Reality Bites" |
| 1995 | Dream On | Porno Actress | Episode: "Am I Blue" |
| 1995 | Campus Cops | Hot Babe | Episode: "3,001" |
| 1996 | Talk Soup | Herself | Episode: "Senor Sock Celebrity Profile" |
| 1996 | Married... with Children | Lap Dancer | Episode: "The Agony and the Extra C" |
| 1996–98 | Baywatch | Jordan Tate | Main Cast: Season 7–8 |
| 1997 | Soul Train | Herself/Guest Host | Episode: "Brownstone/Yvette Michele/Next Level" |
| 1997 | The Anti-Gravity Room | Herself/Guest Host | Episode: "Pot Luck #3" |
| 1997 | Light Lunch | Herself | Episode: "The World's Best Looking Lifeguards" |
| 1997 | Head over Heels | Marcy | Episode: "Vice Guy" |
| 1998 | Hollywood Squares | Herself/Panelist | Recurring Guest |
| 1999 | The Dream Team | Victoria Carrera | Main Cast |
| 1999 | The Jamie Foxx Show | Donyel | Episode: "Joy Ride" |
| 1999 | Exploring the Fantasy | Herself/Host | Main Host |
| 2000 | To Tell the Truth | Herself/Guest Panelist | Recurring Guest Panelist |
| 2000 | Malcolm & Eddie | Jane | Episode: "The Best Men" |
| 2000 | The Parkers | Angela | Episode: "Since I Lost My Baby" |
| 2000 | Strip Mall | Dawna | Recurring Cast: Season 1 |
| 2000–02 | BattleBots | Herself/Feature Reporter | Main Feature Reporter: Season 1–5 |
| 2001 | The Test | Herself/Panelist | Episode: "The Dating Test" |
| 2001 | E! True Hollywood Story | Herself | Episode: "Baywatch" |
| 2001 | Spy TV | Herself | Episode: "Episode #1.12" |
| 2001 | Ripley's Believe It or Not! | Herself | Episode: "Episode #2.22" |
| 2001 | Rendez-View | Herself/Guest Host | Episode: "Blonde Ambition" |
| 2001 | Black Scorpion | Vapor | Episode: "Life's a Gas" |
| 2002 | Celebrity Boot Camp | Herself | Main Cast |
| 2003 | Rock Me Baby | Kia | Episode: "A Pain in the Aspen" |
| 2003 | The Proud Family | Jasmine (voice) | Episode: "Smackmania 6: Mongo vs. Mama's Boy" |
| 2003–04 | Nudes in the News | Herself | Recurring Guest |
| 2004 | Hollywood Squares | Herself/Panelist | Recurring Guest |
| 2004 | The Surreal Life | Herself | Main Cast: Season 2 |
| 2004 | Girlfriends | Candy | Episode: "A Partnerless Partner" |
| 2004 | Reno 911! | New Williams - Deputy Verlot | Episode: "Department Investigation: Part 2" |
| 2004–05 | Lingerie Bowl | Herself/Host | Main Host |
| 2005 | Negermagasinet | Herself | Episode: "Traci Bingham" |
| 2005 | Poorman's Bikini Beach | Herself | Episode: "Chocolate Wrestling, Margarita Beach, and Hefner's 78th" |
| 2006 | Celebrity Big Brother's Big Mouth | Herself | Episode: "Episode #2.16" |
| 2006 | Celebrity Big Brother | Herself | Main Cast: Season 4 |
| 2006 | Big Brother's Little Brother | Herself | Episode: "Celebrity Big Brother's Little Brother: Reunion" |
| 2006 | Fear Factor | Herself/Contestant | Episode: "Celebrity Fear Factor" |
| 2006 | Celebrity Paranormal Project | Herself | Episode: "Pearl's Story" |
| 2007 | The Tyra Banks Show | Herself | Episode: "I Love New York/The Surreal Life Fame Game" |
| 2007 | Sunset Tan | Herself | Episode: "New Kid on the Block" |
| 2007 | The Surreal Life: Fame Games | Herself/Participant | Main Cast |
| 2008 | Gimme My Reality Show! | Herself | Main Cast |
| 2010 | Playboy Shootout | Herself/Guest Judge | Episode: "Episode #1.3" |
| 2010 | Comedy Central Roast | Herself | Episode: "Comedy Central Roast of David Hasselhoff" |
| 2014 | Hell's Kitchen | Herself/Restaurant Patron | Episode: "Winner Chosen" |
| 2014 | Sugar Baby | Herself/Host | Episode: "Episode #1.1" |
| 2017 | Battle of the Network Stars | Herself/Contestant | Episode: "Variety vs. TV Sex Symbols" |

=== Music Videos ===
| Year | Song | Artist |
|---|---|---|
| 1991 | "Good Vibrations" | Marky Mark and the Funky Bunch |
| 1998 | "Money Ain't a Thang" | Jermaine Dupri & Jay-Z |
| 1999 | "I Really Like It" | Harlem World featuring Mase & Kelly Price |
| 2001 | "Nothing's Wrong" | Won-G featuring DJ Quik & James DeBarge |

=== Documentary ===
| Year | Title |
|---|---|
| 1998 | Playboy: Babes of Baywatch |
| 2005 | Official Fantasy Fest |
| 2013 | Chasing Beauty |
| 2015 | Lord of the Freaks |
