= Just the Way You Like It =

Just the Way You Like It may refer to:

- Just the Way You Like It (The S.O.S. Band album), 1984
- Just the Way You Like It (Tasha Holiday album), 1997
  - "Just the Way You Like It" (song), title track from the album
