= G.S.N.T. 3: The Troubled Times of Brian Carenard =

Studio album by Saigon
- Released: September 30, 2014
- Recorded: 2013–2014
- Genre: Hip hop
- Length: 51:32
- Label: Squid Ink Squad
- Producer: Bananaz, Clev Trev, Deli Beats, DJ Corbett, DJ Premier, Grande, Shuko

Saigon chronology
| The Greatest Story Never Told Chapter 2: Bread and Circuses (2012) | G.S.N.T. 3: The Troubled Times of Brian Carenard (2014) |

Singles from G.S.N.T. 3: The Troubled Times of Brian Carenard
- 1. "Best Mistake" Released: December 9, 2013; 2. "Sinner's Prayer" Released: July 29, 2014; 3. "Nunya" Released: August 19, 2014

G.S.N.T. 3: The Troubled Times of Brian Carenard is the third studio album by American hip hop recording artist Saigon. The album was released on September 30, 2014, by Squid Ink Squad. The album features guest appearances from Just Blaze, Corbett, P. Jericho, Papoose, Omar Epps, Curbside Hustle, Big Daddy Kane, G. Martin, Memphis Bleek, Lil Bibby, Kool G Rap and Bryonn Bain. The album was supported by the singles "Best Mistake", "Sinner's Prayer" and "Nunya".

== Singles ==
On December 9, 2013, the album's first single "Best Mistake" featuring G. Martin was released. On January 21, 2014, the music video was released for the single. On July 29, 2014, the album's second single "Sinner's Prayer" featuring Papoose and Omar Epps was released. On August 4, 2014, the music video was released for the single. On August 19, 2014, the album's third single "Nunya" was released. On September 28, 2014, the music video was released for the single.

== Critical response ==
Professional ratings
Review scores
| Source | Rating |
|---|---|
| HipHopDX | 3/5 stars |
| XXL | 3/5 (L) |

G.S.N.T. 3: The Troubled Times of Brian Carenard received mixed reviews from music critics. Brandon Matthews of XXL gave the album an L, saying "True hip-hop fans will appreciate his new body of work as it counteracts the contemporary formula of heavy bass driven tracks that seem to have saturated radio. His features solidify his reputable status by having tracks with legends such as Big Daddy Kane, Kool G Rap, Papoose and even features Omar Epps. He also grabs 2014 XXL Freshman Lil Bibby and fellow New York lyricist Memphis Bleek, who both shine on “Mechanical Animals (4 generations).” His beat selection identifies his desire to be a staple in the industry as opposed to a novelty, tapping the services of DJ Premier and Clev Trev." Jay Balfour of HipHopDX gave the album three out of five stars, saying "While he’s developed himself into a recognizable Hip Hop pundit outside of his music, Saigon has struggled to maintain his voice inside of it. There’s consolation in the fact that he’s still a talented emcee, but he’s tried too much while staying safe at the same time. Saigon fans will find plenty to pick through on GSNT3 but they may be the most alienated listeners as well, more aware than anyone that he is capable of better."

== Track listing ==
| No. | Title | Producer(s) | Length |
|---|---|---|---|
| 1. | "Back to Reality" (featuring Just Blaze) | | 1:15 |
| 2. | "Come Alive" (featuring Corbett) | DJ Corbett | 4:20 |
| 3. | "Street Gospel" (featuring P. Jericho) | Deli Beats | 3:44 |
| 4. | "Definitions from Bryonn Bain" | Clev Trev | 0:40 |
| 5. | "Sinner's Prayer" (featuring Papoose & Omar Epps) | Clev Trev | 4:06 |
| 6. | "My Mama Thinks I'm Crazy" (featuring Curbside Hustle) | Clev Trev | 3:57 |
| 7. | "Mine, Mine, Mine" | Clev Trev | 3:17 |
| 8. | "Let's Get Smart" | DJ Premier | 3:48 |
| 9. | "One Foot in the Door" (featuring Big Daddy Kane) | DJ Premier | 4:32 |
| 10. | "Nunya (None of Your Business)" | DJ Premier | 4:06 |
| 11. | "Best Mistake" (featuring G. Martin) | Bananaz | 4:28 |
| 12. | "Deception" | Grande | 3:41 |
| 13. | "Bring That" | DJ Corbett | 2:37 |
| 14. | "Mechanical Animals" (featuring Memphis Bleek, Lil Bibby & Kool G Rap) | Clev Trev | 3:05 |
| 15. | "Contraband 3 (A,B,C,D)" | Shuko | 2:59 |
| 16. | "Reincarnation" (featuring Bryonn Bain) | Clev Trev | 0:57 |
