= Come On Baby (Saigon song) =

"Come on Baby"

Single by Saigon featuring Swizz Beatz

from the album The Greatest Story Never Told
- Released: July 14, 2007
- Recorded: 2007
- Genre: Hardcore hip hop
- Length: 3:44 (Album version); 4:04 (Original & Remix versions)
- Label: Fort Knocks; Atlantic
- Songwriters: Brian Carenard, Kasseem Dean Shawn Carter, Smith
- Producer: Just Blaze

Saigon singles chronology
"Pain in My Life" (2007)	"Come on Baby" (2007)	"It's Alright" (2009)

Swizz Beatz singles chronology
"My Drink n My 2 Step" (2007)	"Come On Baby" (2007)	"Blow Ya Mind" (2007)

"Come on Baby" is a song by rapper Saigon, released on July 14, 2007 as the first single from his debut album The Greatest Story Never Told. The song features Swizz Beatz on the hook and was produced by Just Blaze. The album version features a verse by Jay-Z. The song samples the J. Geils Band's "Southside Shuffle". The music video for the song made its debut on 106 & Park on November 8, 2007.

== Remix ==
The official remix features two new verses by Saigon, a verse from Jay-Z, and Swizz Beatz's original hook and was released on November 6, 2007. Jay-Z's verse was included as the second verse on the album version of the song, replacing Saigon's original third verse.

Asher Roth recorded a song over the same instrumental entitled "Rick Smits", and west coast artists Planet Asia and Fashawn have also recorded over the instrumental.

== Samples and film references ==
- "Come On Baby" sampled J. Geils Band's "Southside Shuffle" (Atlantic, 1973), using the riff at 0:07 in the song.
- "Come On Baby" appears in the 2009 film Fighting, in the Bronx arrival scene at 33:30.
