= The Greatest Story Never Told Chapter 2: Bread and Circuses =

Studio album by Saigon
- Released: November 6, 2012
- Recorded: 2011–12
- Genre: Hip hop
- Length: 61:19
- Label: Abandoned Nation; Suburban Noize
- Producer: Just Blaze (also exec.), Shuko, Clev Trev, DJ Corbett, Canei Finch, Rich Kidd, Bounce Brothas, Sire

Saigon chronology
The Greatest Story Never Told (2011)	The Greatest Story Never Told Chapter 2: Bread and Circuses (2012)	G.S.N.T. 3: The Troubled Times of Brian Carenard (2014)

Singles from The Greatest Story Never Told Chapter 2: Bread and Circuses
- 1. "Not Like Them" Released: September 11, 2012; 2. "Best Thing That I Found" Released: October 26, 2012

The Greatest Story Never Told Chapter 2: Bread and Circuses is the second studio album by American hip hop recording artist Saigon. The album was released on November 6, 2012. The album features guest appearances from Corbett, Styles P, Marsha Ambrosius, Andreena Mill, Rayne Dior, Lecrae, G Martin, Tony Collins, Chamillionaire, and Stic.man.

== Release and promotion ==
The album was originally scheduled to be released on September 11, 2012, but was later pushed back until November 6, 2012. The track listing for the album was released on September 20, 2012. The first single "Not Like Them" featuring Styles P was released on September 11, 2012. On September 11, 2012, the music video for "Not Like Them" featuring Styles P was released. On October 24, 2012, the music video was released for "Relafriendship" featuring G Martin. The second single, "The Best Thing that I Found" featuring Lecrae and Corbett, was premiered on Rapzilla on October 26, 2012.

On November 5, 2012, the music video was released for "Blown Away". On November 27, 2012, the music video was released for "The Game Changer" featuring Marsha Ambrosius. On December 12, 2012, the music video was released for "Plant The Seed (What U Paid For)". On January 29, 2013, the music video was released for "Our Babies 2 (Crazy World)". On March 26, 2013, the music video was released for "Best Thing That I Found" featuring Lecrae and Corbett. On May 27, 2013, the music video was released for "Rap vs. Real".

== Critical response ==
Professional ratings
Review scores
Source	Rating
AllMusic	4/5 stars
Exclaim!	7/10
HipHopDX	3.5/5 stars
MSN Music (Expert Witness)	A−
RapReviews	8/10
XXL	4/5 (XL)

The Greatest Story Never Told Chapter 2: Bread and Circuses was met with generally favorable reviews from music critics. At Metacritic, which assigns a weighted mean rating out of 100 to reviews from mainstream critics, the album received an average score of 69, based on 6 reviews, which indicates "positive reviews." Robert Christgau of MSN Music found the album "slightly less militant and, as a direct result, stronger" than its predecessor and stated, "almost nothing here dips to ordinary. And beats or not, one reason is that the rapper's rough clarity is musical bedrock." Chris Dart of Exclaim! gave the album a seven out of ten, saying "Saigon's only downfall is that sometimes he's just a little too earnest. Social conscience and political awareness are good, but occasionally they feel too much like he's making us eat our vegetables. 'Brownsville Girl' comes across like an after-school special, while 'Blown Away' is just straight-up ham-fisted in its tales of social injustice. These missteps aside, it's hard to argue with Bread and Circuses. It's not game changing, but Saigon's fanbase will love it, and sometimes it's better to stick with what you know." Amanda Bassa of HipHopDX gave the album three and a half stars out of five, saying, "In true Sai-giddy fashion, he leaves his audience with some of his own lessons that he has learned in life. Rather than sounding preachy, he succeeds in leaving the impression that he simply wants other people to listen, understand, and take notes in hopes that children like his daughter won’t have to grow up in such a volatile environment (word to 'Crazy World'). 'Stocking Cap' Sai may be no more, but Saigon proves that he still hasn’t lost his touch on the mic."

Christopher Minaya of XXL gave the album an XL, saying, "In short, Saigon’s second LP offers a sizable amount of diversity over fitting instrumentals, exhibiting how much he has evolved as a rapper by personifying his bars to reflect his music and his life. The album is gratifying, surely enough to make those whom[sic] purchase the album to be happy with what they paid for." Steve Juon of RapReviews gave the album an eight out of ten, saying, "As a sequel to 'The Greatest Story Never Told' some people will feel that it's not as good as the original, but as for this reviewer Saigon is still that dude who has something to say that's worth hearing." David Jeffries of Allmusic gave the album four out of five stars, saying, "Still, the beats are as varied and well selected as the guest list which counts Styles P, Chamillionaire, Marsha Ambrosius, and Lecrae amongst its most desirable guest shots. A couple more albums this rich and Saigon might actually save the game, begging the question: then what will he rap about?"

== Commercial performance ==
The album debuted at number 151 on the Billboard 200 chart, with first-week sales of 2,800 copies in the United States.

== Track listing ==
No.	Title	Producer(s)	Length
1.	"Plant the Seed (What U Paid For)"	Shuko, Just Blaze	3:49
2.	"Rap vs. Real"	Just Blaze, Clev Trev	2:46
3.	"Let Me Run" (featuring Corbett)	DJ Corbett	4:02
4.	"Not Like Them" (featuring Styles P)	DJ Corbett	2:56
5.	"Brownsville Girl"	Shuko	2:38
6.	"The Game Changer" (featuring Marsha Ambrosius)	Canei Finch	3:49
7.	"Blown Away"	DJ Corbett	3:08
8.	"When Will U Love Me" (featuring Andreena Mill)	Rich Kidd	4:11
9.	"The Vowel Song" (featuring Rayne Dior)	Saigon, Rayne Dior	0:24
10.	"Best Thing That I Found" (featuring Lecrae & Corbett)	DJ Corbett	3:34
11.	"Relafriendship" (featuring G Martin)	Shuko, Bounce Brothas	4:05
12.	"Yeah Yeah"	Shuko	3:03
13.	"Forever Dreamin’" (featuring Tony Collins)	Canei Finch	4:42
14.	"Intervention (Let It Go)" (featuring G Martin)	Sire, Clev Trev	4:51
15.	"Our Babies 2 (Crazy World)"	Clev Trev	3:42
16.	"Keep Pushing" (featuring Chamillionaire)	DJ Corbett	3:22
17.	"Blown Away Pt. 2" (featuring stic.man)	DJ Corbett	2:56
18.	"Rap vs. Real (Homegrown)"	Clev Trev	3:22
