= Get Ready (Mase song) =

Single by Mase featuring Blackstreet

from the album Double Up
- Released: May 25, 1999
- Genre: Hip hop
- Length: 4:20
- Label: Bad Boy; Arista
- Songwriters: Mason Betha; Andreao "Fanatic" Heard; N. Sylvers; Charmaine Sylvers; Dana Meyers
- Producers: Sean "Puffy" Combs; Andreao "Fanatic" Heard"

Mase singles chronology
"I Really Like It" (1999)	"Get Ready" (1999)	"Welcome Back" (2004)

Blackstreet singles chronology
"Girlfriend/Boyfriend" (1999)	"Get Ready" (1999)	"Think About You" (1999)

"Get Ready" is the only single released from Mase's second album, Double Up. Released on May 25, 1999, it was produced by Sean "Puffy" Combs and Andreao "Fanatic" Heard", featured R&B group Blackstreet, and contained a sample of Shalamar's 1982 single "A Night to Remember".

"Get Ready" was Mase's poorest-performing single, largely due to his retirement from music before the song's official release, meaning that he did not promote or perform the song publicly. It failed to match the success of his previous three singles, only making it to #25 on the Bubbling Under Hot 100 Singles (125 on the U.S. Charts) and #50 on the Hot R&B/Hip-Hop Singles & Tracks.

== Single track listing ==
=== A-Side ===
1. "Get Ready" (Radio Mix)- 4:20
2. "Get Ready" (Instrumental)- 4:12
3. "Get Ready" (Acappella)- 4:22

=== B-Side ===
1. "Get Ready" (Radio Mix)- 4:20
2. "Get Ready" (Instrumental)- 4:12
3. "Get Ready" (Acappella)- 4:22

== Charts ==
Chart (1999)	Peak position
Australia (ARIA)	23
Germany (GfK)	86
Netherlands (Dutch Top 40 Tipparade)	2
Netherlands (Single Top 100)	41
New Zealand (Recorded Music NZ)	10
Scotland Singles (OCC)	62
UK Singles (OCC)	25
UK Hip Hop/R&B (OCC)	6
US Bubbling Under Hot 100 (Billboard)	25
US Hot R&B/Hip-Hop Songs (Billboard)	50
US Rhythmic Airplay (Billboard)	38
