= Cali Chronic =

1999 single by Harlem World

Single by Harlem World featuring Snoop Dogg

from the album The Movement
- B-side: "Not the Kids"
- Released: 1999
- Recorded: 1999
- Genre: Hip-hop
- Length: 3:55
- Label: So So Def
- Producer: D-Dot

Harlem World singles chronology
"I Really Like It" (1999)	"Cali Chronic" (1999)	"Get the Picture" (2011)

Snoop Dogg singles chronology
"G Bedtime Stories" (1999)	"Cali Chronic" (1999)	"Bitch Please" (1999)

Cali Chronic, also known by its edited title Cali, is the second and final single released by the rap group Harlem World, produced by D-Dot. The single version featured a verse from Snoop Dogg. The song contains a sample of "Funky Worm" performed by the Ohio Players. "Cali Chronic" peaked at number 87 on the Hot R&B/Hip-Hop Singles & Tracks chart.

== Single track listing ==
=== A-Side ===
1. "Cali Chronic" (LBC Mix)
2. "Cali Chronic" (LBC Mix Squeaky Clean)
3. "Cali Chronic" (LP Instrumental)

=== B-Side ===
1. "Not The Kids" (LP Version Dirty)
2. "Not The Kids" (LP Version Clean)
3. "Cali Chronic" (Clean LP Version)

== Chart performance ==
Chart (1999)	Peak position
US Hot R&B/Hip-Hop Songs (Billboard)	87
