= The Greatest Story Never Told =

Studio album by Saigon
- Released: February 15, 2011
- Recorded: 2005–2010
- Genre: Hip hop
- Length: 79:00
- Labels: Abandoned Nation; Suburban Noize
- Producers: Just Blaze (also exec.), Adam Blackstone, Buckwild, D. Allen, DJ Corbett, Lamar Edwards, James Poyser, Red Spyda, SC, Spanky, Kanye West

Saigon chronology
The Greatest Story Never Told (2011)	The Greatest Story Never Told Chapter 2: Bread and Circuses (2012)

Singles from The Greatest Story Never Told
- 1. "Come on Baby" Released: July 14, 2007; 2. "Bring Me Down" Released: November 9, 2010; 3. "The Greatest Story Never Told" Released: January 11, 2011; 4. "Clap" Released: 2011

The Greatest Story Never Told is the debut studio album by American rapper Saigon, released February 15, 2011 on Abandoned Nation and Suburban Noize Records. The album was initially scheduled to be released in 2007, but experienced numerous delays due to issues with Saigon's previous label Atlantic Records. Although primarily produced by Just Blaze, The Greatest Story Never Told features additional production from several renowned producers, such as Buckwild, Scram Jones and Kanye West, with guest appearances from Black Thought, Bun B, Faith Evans, Jay-Z and Q-Tip, among others.

In its opening week, The Greatest Story Never Told entered on the Billboard 200 at number 61, selling 11,000 copies. In its second week, the album sold an additional 4,800 copies, bringing its total sales to around 16,000. As of March 6, 2011, the album has sold 19,000 copies in the United States. Upon its release, The Greatest Story Never Told received rave reviews from music critics and hip hop publications, who complimented the album's intellectual lyrics, soulful production, and overall cohesiveness.

== Background ==
In the late 1990s, Brian "Saigon" Carenard was sentenced to jail time at Napanoch's Eastern Correctional Facility, serving a sentence for first-degree assault after shooting at someone in a bar. One day, while in the recreation yard, Brian met a fellow inmate named Hakim, who rapped and had a reputation for incorporating positive messages, and heavy use of prestigious vocabulary, in his rhymes. Carenard would later state that battle rapping with Hakim would help instigate his personal rehabilitation, as he set a course for redemption through hip hop music. While serving time, Brian named himself "Saigon" after reading Wallace Terry's book about the Vietnam War. This book helped realign the content and diction in Saigon's raps, as did the advice of a prison lifer: "There's no right way to do wrong." Saigon was eventually released from prison in the year 2000, and immediately recorded mixtapes, with the goal of obtaining a record contract as a means to release a debut album, which he wanted to be titled "The Greatest Story Never Told".

With the help of the underground buzz that he had garnered over the years, Saigon signed a record deal with Atlantic Records in 2004. Despite the co-sign from producer Just Blaze and collaborations with several acclaimed rap artists such as Jay-Z, Kanye West and Kool G Rap, Saigon's record label repeatedly balked at setting a release date for his debut album. Saigon revealed that he realized as early as two months into his deal with Atlantic Records that there were problems. He later recalled how his early excitement at signing to the same label that "had so much history with black music, like Aretha Franklin and Ray Charles" was quickly dampened when they suggested he record a radio-friendly song with the Miami-based R&B quartet, Pretty Ricky. He also recalled a meeting with an Atlantic executive who told him "We need our three singles, then you can bust your artistic nut on the rest of the album." Saigon, however, wasn't willing to comply with this request, and only one year after signing with Atlantic, he hired a lawyer to work out a release from his label. He explained, "They signed me knowing the kind of music I was making, but then they try and change the direction."

This, however, didn't prompt a break from his record company, as they offered a few stipends, leading him and his fans to believe they'd still eventually put the record out. Saigon later suspected that Atlantic wanted to make sure he didn't take the material elsewhere and benefit from the buzz he'd created. While caught in this issue with Atlantic, Saigon continued to perform freestyles on hip hop radio shows, release mixtapes, and also continued to write and record The Greatest Story Never Told. Despite not having an official album out, Saigon gradually became somewhat of a high-profile hip hop artist, as he appeared on the covers of several magazines and had a recurring role playing himself on the hit HBO show Entourage.

== Controversies ==
=== Myspace blog ===
On June 1, 2007, Saigon posted a blog entry on his Myspace stating that he felt Atlantic Records didn't have the desire to release his album because he is a real artist, not a "jingle writer", and they only care about the money, not the music. He stated that the album would be released independently if Atlantic would not release it. Saigon later took down that blog because he thought it offended Just Blaze.

On June 14, 2007, Just Blaze responded to Saigon's comments on his own blog. He stated that he was not offended by the blog but just didn't understand why Saigon would post it now when the only thing holding up the album release was a sample clearance for the single "C'mon Baby", which Craig Kallman — president of Atlantic — was personally handling. Saigon then posted an apology to Just Blaze. Just Blaze later posted that all samples had been cleared. The issue has since been resolved.

=== Retirement rumors ===
On November 19, 2007, Saigon posted a blog entry on his Myspace entitled "I QUIT", announcing his retirement from the music industry. In a statement he gave to HipHopGame.com late in the day, he said, "This is it. The Greatest Story Never Told...I guess you could say it was prophecy," implying that the album would not be released. On November 26, 2007, Just Blaze posted a blog stating that he was putting the final touches on The Greatest Story Never Told. He continued to hint that the album may in fact be released. On December 19, 2007, exactly one month from the first blog, Saigon posted another blog stating that he had reconsidered retiring. He also said that the album would indeed be released, saying, "My album WILL be released VERY soon." The album's executive producer stated that The Greatest Story Never Told had undergone its final mastering on January 8.

In an interview with hiphopgame.com, Just Blaze explained various reasons behind the numerous delays of The Greatest Story Never Told, the most prominent being that he wished to establish a relationship with Saigon before creating an album. In the said interview he expressed that "...people wouldn't have found out about the deal until maybe a year and a half ago as opposed to three years ago." Saigon had stated that he planned to release the album by September 30, 2008, but was unable to achieve this.

=== Release from label ===
In May 2008, Just Blaze announced Saigon's release from Atlantic, while acquiring full ownership of the album. Shortly after this announcement, Saigon stated there was a new situation in the works, and that they were getting a new deal and the album would be released in 2011. Saigon claims that he's never been given a definitive reason why Atlantic refused to release the album, but on the song "Believe It", he raps, "They rather me pretend to be something that I'm not/I'm the new Public Enemy, I'm different than Young Joc."

== Critical reception ==
Professional ratings
Aggregate scores
Source	Rating
Metacritic	89/100
Review scores
Source	Rating
AllMusic	4/5 stars
The A.V. Club	A
IGN	(8/10)
MSN Music (Consumer Guide)	A−
Okayplayer	91/100
The Phoenix	4/4 stars
PopMatters	7/10
RapReviews	9/10
The Source	4.5/5 stars
The Village Voice	(favorable)

The Greatest Story Never Told received rave reviews from contemporary music critics. At Metacritic, which assigns a normalized rating out of 100 to reviews from mainstream critics, the album received an average score of 89, based on 13 reviews, which indicates "universal acclaim". Nathan Rabin of The A.V. Club stated, "Told sometimes feels like too much of a good thing; at 18 furious tracks, it's overwhelming in the best sense. Saigon's background as an ex-con lends specificity and direction to his social criticism: He's a battle-tested survivor singling out the injustices and hypocrisy of a world filled with prisons and traps, real and metaphorical. Told is worth the wait." In his review for The Village Voice, Phillip Mlynar complimented Saigon for his "sincerity" and ability to offer advice to his listeners. Chad Grischow from IGN praised the album's themes and message, and wrote that "it is the balance of uplifting, positive energy and gritty realism that makes this debut work so well." About.com's Henry Adaso gave the album four out of five stars and called it "tight, visceral, consistent."

Although stating "there are references to events like Katrina, that, while certainly not irrelevant, are not quite as much in the musical parlance as they were a couple of years prior" and being unfavorable toward several of the songs' long lengths, Marisa Brown from Allmusic extolled producer Just Blaze's contributions, commenting, "Blaze has always been a very involved, musically attuned producer, and his attention to detail is evident here, from the alarm clock motif to the way he transitions between tracks." Brown also applauded Saigon's "intelligent" lyrics and complimented him for his maturity throughout the years while recording the album. Chris Faraone from The Phoenix also complimented Saigon's maturity, explaining "To his credit, the Saigon who emerges here is aeons more mature than the clever criminal who kicked the New York mixtape game in the dick five years ago, or even the MC who played himself on Entourage. The somewhat reformed loose cannon is now a thoughtful class warrior with switchblade skills, whom cats can actually relate to." In his consumer guide for MSN Music, critic Robert Christgau gave it an A− rating and stated "this is the Saigon and Just Blaze album I've been waiting for since a student tipped me to them five years ago — heroic post-gangstaism, with the conscious ex-con forthright as rhymer and rapper and the Jay-Z sideman bigging him up with soul singers and cinematic beats (and also with Jay-Z)."

== Commercial performance ==
In its debut week on the Billboard 200, The Greatest Story Never Told entered at number 61, selling 11,000 copies. In its second week, the album sold an additional 4,800 copies, bringing its total sales to about 16,000 copies. As of March 6, 2011, the album has sold 19,000 copies in the United States.

== Track listing ==
No.	Title	Writer(s)	Producer(s)	Length
1.	"Station Identification (Intro)" (featuring Fatman Scoop)	Brian Carenard, Isaac Freeman III, Justin Smith	Just Blaze	2:43
2.	"The Invitation" (featuring Q-Tip and Fatman Scoop)	Carenard, Smith, Kamaal Fareed	Just Blaze	4:36
3.	"Come on Baby" (featuring Jay-Z and Swizz Beatz)	Carenard, Shawn Carter, Kaseem Dean, Smith	Just Blaze	3:43
4.	"War" (skit)		Just Blaze, Lamar Edwards	1:59
5.	"Bring Me Down (Part 2)"	Carenard, Smith	Just Blaze, DJ Corbett (add.)	4:46
6.	"Enemies"	Carenard, Smith	D. Allen, Just Blaze (add.)	3:41
7.	"Friends"	Carenard, Smith	Just Blaze	1:50
8.	"The Greatest Story Never Told"	Carenard, Smith	Just Blaze	4:00
9.	"Clap" (featuring Faith Evans)	Carenard, Faith Evans, Smith	Just Blaze	6:30
10.	"Preacher" (featuring Lee Fields and The Expressions)	Carenard, Smith	Just Blaze	4:22
11.	"It's Alright" (featuring Marsha Ambrosius)	Marsha Ambrosius, Carenard, Kanye West	Kanye West	5:59
12.	"Believe It"	Carenard, Smith	Just Blaze	6:01
13.	"Give It to Me" (featuring Raheem DeVaughn)	Carenard, Raheem DeVaughn, Smith	SC, Just Blaze (add.)	5:17
14.	"What the Lovers Do" (featuring Devin the Dude)	Carenard, Devin Copeland, Smith, Andy Thelusma	Red Spyda, Just Blaze (add.)	4:15
15.	"Better Way" (featuring Layzie Bone)	Carenard, Steven Howse, Smith	Just Blaze	4:30
16.	"Oh Yeah (Our Babies)"	Anthony Best, Carenard, Smith	Buckwild, Just Blaze (add.)	4:14
17.	"And the Winner Is..." (featuring Bun B)	Bernard Freeman, Carenard, Smith	Just Blaze, James Poyser (add.), Spanky (add.), Adam Blackstone (add.)	6:18
18.	"Too Long" (featuring Black Thought) (hidden track)	Carenard, Tariq Trotter	DJ Corbett	4:11

Deluxe bonus tracks
No.	Title	Length
1.	"It's Cold"	3:54
2.	"Down The Road"	3:23
3.	"I Want It All"	3:40
4.	"On My Way"	4:19
5.	"Bring Me Down (Part 1)"	3:15

• (add.) Additional production

- Track 4 was incorrectly credited to Scram Jones; actually produced by Just Blaze and Lamar Edwards.

Sample credits

- "Come on Baby" contains a sample of "Southside Shuffle" performed by J. Geils Band
- "War" contains a sample of "The Golden Apple" performed by Bob James
- "Bring Me Down Pt 2" contains a sample of "Sunshine (Adagio In D Minor)" by John Murphy
- "Friends" contains a sample of "Comment" by Charles Wright
- "Oh Yeah" contains a sample of Ghetto Life 101
- "The Greatest Story Never Told" contains a sample of "B.M.F. Beautiful" by Leon Haywood
- "Clap" contains a sample of "Let Me Make Love to You" by Lamont Dozier
- "Preacher" contains elements of "Woe Is Me" by The Dynamics
- "It's Alright" contains a sample of "Superstar/Until You Come Back To Me" performed by Luther Vandross

== Personnel ==
Credits for The Greatest Story Never Told adapted from Allmusic.

- D. Allen – Producer
- Maki Athanasiou – Guitar
- Adam Blackstone – Bass
- Ariel Borujow – Engineer, Mixing
- David Brown – Engineer, Mixing
- Raymond Brown – Design, Layout
- Buckwild – Producer
- Deniece C. – Stylist
- Sway Calloway – Executive Producer
- Neysa Camacho – Executive Producer
- Patricia Cameron – Make-Up
- Canei Finch – Instrumentation, Keyboards
- Piper Carter – Photography
- Commissioner Gordon – Mixing
- Jammal Day – Engineer
- DJ Corbett – Additional Production, Producer
- Lorrance Dopson – Keyboards
- Lamar Edwards – Additional Production, Keyboards
- Ricardo Gutierrez – Mastering
- The Hezinators – Mixing
- Just Blaze – Additional Production, Executive Producer, Producer
- Ken Lewis – Instrumentation
- Rich Nice – Executive Producer
- Keith Parry – Assistant Engineer
- James Poyser – Keyboards, Producer
- Red Spyda – Producer
- Saigon – Executive Producer
- SC – Producer
- Spanky – Drums
- Christos Tsantilis – Mixing
- Kanye West – Producer
- Ryan West – Engineer, Mixing
- Andrew Wright – Engineer, Mixing
- Brad "Daddy X" Xavier – Executive Producer
- Young Guru – Engineer, Mixing
- Kevin Zinger – Executive Producer

== Charts ==
Chart (2011)	Peak position
US Billboard 200	61
US Billboard R&B/Hip-Hop Albums	15
US Billboard Rap Albums	7
US Billboard Independent Albums	9
