= Welcome Back (Mase song) =

Single by American rapper Mase

Single by Mase

from the album Welcome Back
- B-side: "Breathe, Stretch, Shake"
- Released: June 14, 2004
- Length: 4:22 (album version); 3:45 (radio edit)
- Label: Bad Boy Entertainment
- Songwriter: John Sebastian
- Producer: The Movement

Mase singles chronology
"Get Ready" (1999)	"Welcome Back" (2004)	"Breathe, Stretch, Shake" (2004)

Music video
- "Welcome Back" on YouTube

"Welcome Back" is a song by American rapper Mase. It was released by Bad Boy Entertainment as the first single off Mase's third album, Welcome Back. This was the first single that Mase had released since 1999's "Get Ready", after he had taken a five-year hiatus from the music industry. In the United Kingdom, it was issued as a double A-side with Mase's next single, "Breathe, Stretch, Shake".

"Welcome Back" garnered positive reception from critics, who praised its catchy sample taken from "Welcome Back", John Sebastian's theme to the 1970s television show Welcome Back, Kotter. Mase's song peaked at number eight on the US Billboard Hot Rap Tracks chart and number 32 on the Billboard Hot 100 chart. The song has been certified gold by the Recording Industry Association of America (RIAA), denoting sales of over 500,000 units in America. "Welcome Back" also entered the top 40 in several other countries, including New Zealand, where it reached number four.

The accompanying music video for the song, directed by Chris Robinson, parodies the opening to the children's show Mister Rogers' Neighborhood.

== Critical reception ==
AllMusic's David Jeffries praised the track for being reminiscent of early Mase, saying that it's "lyric-filled, driven but effortless, and has a crafty interpolation of a pop tune, this time the Welcome Back, Kotter theme song." Jessica Koslow of HipHopDX put it alongside "Breathe, Stretch, Shake" as being "sure-fire radio/club joints." Rashaun Hall of Billboard said the production work by the Movement on the sample produced "infectious results." Chadwicked of Tiny Mix Tapes praised Mase for maintaining his rap flow while under a different image, saying that "It proves that a man such as Mase can rhyme over a sample from Welcome Back, Kotter; dress up like Mister Rogers in the video and have an 80-year old female back-up dancer, and still be taken seriously and appreciated."

== Chart performance ==
"Welcome Back" debuted at number 52 on the Billboard Hot 100 for the week of June 5, 2004. It reached number 40 the week after and peaked at number 32 the week of June 19, staying on the chart for 11 weeks. On the Hot Rap Tracks chart, it debuted at number 13 for the week of June 5, 2004. Three weeks later, it peaked at number eight the week of June 26. It debuted at number 46 on the Hot R&B/Hip-Hop Singles & Tracks chart and then moved to number 23 for the week of June 5, 2004. Four weeks later, it reached its peak at number 17 for the week of July 3, 2004. It reached the same position on the Rhythmic Top 40 chart for the week of July 10, 2004. The song also charted in New Zealand, debuting at number four and staying there for four weeks, remaining on the chart for 17 weeks. In Switzerland, it debuted at number 25 and stayed there for eight weeks, and in Germany, it reached number 51, with chart progression lasting for seven weeks.

== Music video ==
Directed by Chris Robinson, the video begins as a parody of the opening to the 1968–2001 television series Mister Rogers' Neighborhood, being known in the video as "Mister Betha's Neighborhood." The video features Wyclef Jean pulling up in his Pagani Zonda and also features cameos from Sean "Puffy" Combs, Styles P, Loon, Cardan, Amerie, Pee Wee Kirkland, Fatman Scoop, E. Ness and Babs Bunny.

== Live performance ==
On August 20, 2004, Mase performed the song live on The Late Late Show with Craig Kilborn.

== Remix ==
"It's Alright"

Song by Kanye West featuring Mase and John Legend
- Released: March 22, 2005
- Recorded: 2004
- Genre: Hip hop
- Length: 3:52
- Label: Roc-A-Fella; Def Jam
- Songwriters: Kanye West; Mason Betha; John Stephens
- Producer: Kanye West

The official remix to "Welcome Back" is titled "It's Alright", and it is by hip-hop artist Kanye West, with Mase being a featured artist along with singer John Legend. It was featured on the bonus CD of West's 2005 video album The College Dropout Video Anthology.

== Track listings ==
European CD

1. "Welcome Back" (Radio Edit) – 3:45
2. "Welcome Back" (Main) – 4:23

US 12-inch

A1. "Welcome Back" – 4:22
A2. "Welcome Back" (instrumental) – 4:22
B1. "Breathe, Stretch, Shake" (featuring P. Diddy) – 3:17
B2. "Breathe, Stretch, Shake" (instrumental) – 3:17

== Charts ==
=== Weekly charts ===
Chart (2004)	Peak position
Canada CHR/Pop Top 30 (Radio & Records)	27
Germany (GfK)	51
New Zealand (Recorded Music NZ)	4
Scottish Singles Sales (Official Charts) with "Breathe, Stretch, Shake"	60
Switzerland (Schweizer Hitparade)	25
UK Singles (Official Charts) with "Breathe, Stretch, Shake"	29
UK Hip Hop/R&B (Official Charts) with "Breathe, Stretch, Shake"	12
US Billboard Hot 100	32
US Hot R&B/Hip-Hop Songs (Billboard)	17
US Hot Rap Songs (Billboard)	8
US Rhythmic Airplay (Billboard)	17

=== Year-end charts ===
Chart (2004)	Position
New Zealand (RIANZ)	20
UK Urban (Music Week) with "Breathe, Stretch, Shake"	7
US Hot R&B/Hip-Hop Singles & Tracks (Billboard)	93
US Rhythmic Top 40 (Billboard)	83

== Certifications ==
Region	Certification	Certified units/sales
New Zealand (RMNZ)	Platinum	30,000^{‡}
United States (RIAA)	Gold	500,000^{*}
^{*} Sales figures based on certification alone.^{‡} Sales+streaming figures based on certification alone.

== Release history ==
Region	Version	Date	Format(s)	Label(s)	Ref.
United States	"Welcome Back"	June 14, 2004	Rhythmic contemporary; urban contemporary radio	Bad Boy Entertainment	
United States	"Welcome Back"	June 28, 2004	Contemporary hit radio	Bad Boy Entertainment	
Australia	"Welcome Back"	September 13, 2004	CD	Bad Boy Entertainment	
United Kingdom	"Welcome Back" / "Breathe, Stretch, Shake"	November 8, 2004	CD	Bad Boy Entertainment	
