= Just Blaze =

American record producer (born 1978)

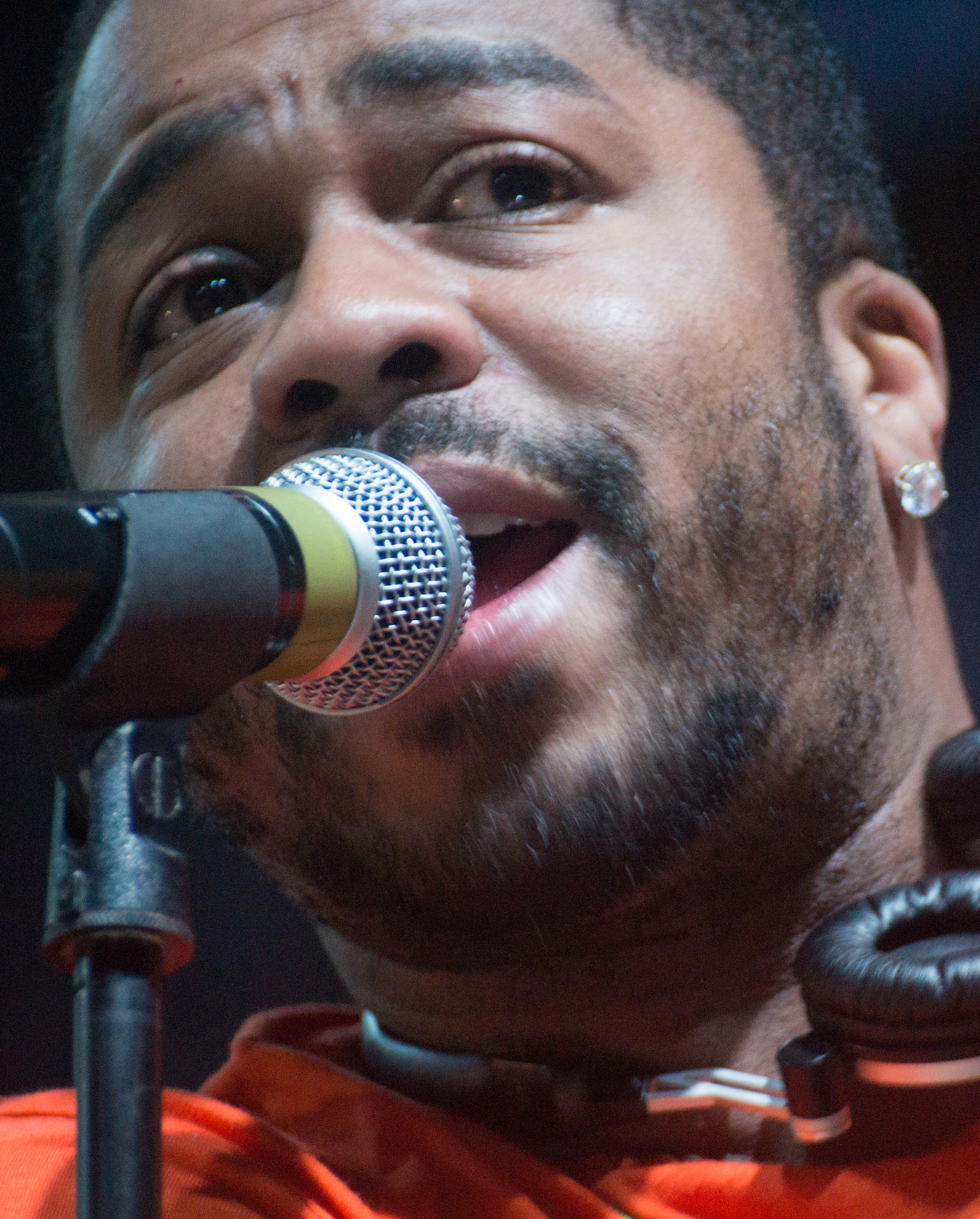
- Smith performing in 2014

Background information
- Born: Justin Gregory Smith; January 8, 1978 (age 48); Paterson, New Jersey, U.S.
- Education: Rutgers University
- Genres: East Coast hip-hop; chipmunk soul
- Occupations: Record producer; disc jockey
- Works: Just Blaze production discography
- Years active: 1998–present
- Labels: Fort Knocks; HHS78; F.O.B. Entertainment; N.Q.C. Management, Inc.; Enigma Music; Roc The World

Justin Gregory Smith (born January 8, 1978), known professionally as Just Blaze, is an American record producer primarily in Hip-Hop. Born in Paterson, New Jersey, Smith attended Rutgers University for three years before dropping out to pursue a career in music production. He gained recognition as an in-house producer for Roc-A-Fella Records in the early 2000s, developing the "chipmunk soul" sampling style that was prominent in hip hop during that time. Blaze produced songs for several influential artists including Jay-Z, Fabolous, Beanie Sigel, Freeway, The Diplomats, Joe Budden, Kanye West ((Touch the Sky), T.I., and Eminem among many others. He played a key role in producing key songs in seminal albums for Jay-Z (U Don't Know, Public Service Announcement (song)) such as on The Blueprint and The Black Album.

Smith produced Eminem's 2010 single "No Love" and appeared in its accompanying music video. He has composed soundtracks for video games, and was a character in NBA Street Vol. 2. His stage name was inspired by the character Blaze Fielding from the Streets of Rage video game series. Smith founded the record label Fort Knocks Entertainment in 2004, through which he has signed artists including Saigon and Ms. Jade. He was awarded a key to the city by Paterson in July 2018, in recognition of his "outstanding cultural contribution" to his hometown.

== Notable Production discography ==
Year	Single	Chart positions					Album
Year	Single	US Hot 100	US R&B	US Rap	CAN	UK	Album
1999	"I Really Like It" (Harlem World feat. Mase & Kelly Price)	61	31	8	–	–	The Movement
2001	"Beanie (Mack Bitch)" (Beanie Sigel)	–	49	11	–	–	The Reason
2001	"Girls, Girls, Girls" (Jay-Z)	17	4	3	–	11	The Blueprint
2002	"Roc the Mic" (Beanie Sigel & Freeway)	55	16	6	–	–	State Property
2002	"Song Cry" (Jay-Z)	–	45	23	–	–	The Blueprint
2002	"Oh Boy" (Cam'ron feat. Juelz Santana)	4	1	1	24	19	Come Home with Me
2002	"Hovi Baby" (Jay-Z)	–	76	–	–	–	The Blueprint 2: The Gift & The Curse
2002	"React" (Erick Sermon feat. Redman)	36	12	8	–	–	React
2002	"Boy (I Need You)" (Mariah Carey feat. Cam'ron)	–	68	–	29	17	Charmbracelet
2002	"What We Do" (Freeway feat. Jay-Z & Beanie Sigel)	97	47	–	–	–	Philadelphia Freeway
2003	"I Really Mean It" (The Diplomats)	–	64	–	–	–	Diplomatic Immunity
2003	"Flipside" (Freeway feat. Peedi Crakk)	82	40	–	–	–	Philadelphia Freeway
2003	"Alright" (Freeway feat. Allen Anthony)	–	–	–	–	–	Philadelphia Freeway
2003	"Can't Let You Go" (Fabolous feat. Lil' Mo & Mike Shorey)	4	2	2	27	14	Street Dreams
2003	"Pump It Up" (Joe Budden)	38	16	10	–	–	Joe Budden
2003	"Fire" (Joe Budden feat. Busta Rhymes)	–	48	–	–	–	Joe Budden
2003	"Round Here" (Memphis Bleek feat. Trick Daddy & T.I.)	–	53	–	–	–	M.A.D.E.
2004	"Breathe" (Fabolous)	10	4	2	36	28	Real Talk
2005	"Never Been in Love" (Talib Kweli)	–	–	–	–	–	The Beautiful Struggle
2005	"Touch the Sky" (Kanye West feat. Lupe Fiasco)	42	23	10	10	6	Late Registration
2006	"Tell Me" (Diddy feat. Christina Aguilera)	47	38	14	13	8	Press Play
2006	"Show Me What You Got" (Jay-Z)	8	3	4	38	38	Kingdom Come
2006	"The Champ" (Ghostface Killah)	-	-	-	-	-	Fishscale
2007	"The Second Coming" (Juelz Santana & Just Blaze)	108	–	–	–	–	Nike
2007	"Come on Baby" (Saigon feat. Swizz Beatz)	–	–	–	–	–	The Greatest Story Never Told
2008	"Live Your Life" (T.I. feat. Rihanna)	1	1	1	3	2	Paper Trail
2009	"All the Above" (Maino feat. T-Pain)	39	19	10	–	–	If Tomorrow Comes...
2009	"Exhibit C" (Jay Electronica)	–	86	–	–	–	Act II: Patents of Nobility (The Turn)
2009	"Gotta Believe It" (Saigon feat. Just Blaze)	–	–	–	–	–	The Greatest Story Never Told
2010	"No Love" (Eminem feat. Lil Wayne)	23	59	9	21	33	Recovery
2011	"The Greatest Story Never Told" (Saigon)	–	–	–	–	–	The Greatest Story Never Told
2011	"I Love My Bitches" (Rick Ross)	–	72	–	–	–	Non-album single
2012	Compton (song) (Kendrick Lamar ft Dr. Dre)	_	_	_	_	_	Good Kid, M.A.A.D City
2016	"Freedom" (Beyoncé feat. Kendrick Lamar)	35	21	–	60	40	Lemonade
2019	"Big Tyme" (Rick Ross feat. Swizz Beatz)	119	–	–	–	–	Port of Miami 2
2021	"We Win" (Lil Baby and Kirk Franklin)	–	–	–	–	–	Space Jam: A New Legacy
2024	"Durag Bleek" (Memphis Bleek)	–	–	–	–	–	Non-album single

== Awards and nominations ==
=== Grammy Awards ===
The Grammy Awards are awarded annually by the National Academy of Recording Arts and Sciences. Just Blaze has been nominated 8 times.

Year	Nominated work	Award	Result
2003	Nellyville (as producer)	Album of the Year	Nominated
2005	Confessions (as producer)	Album of the Year	Nominated
2006	Late Registration (as producer)	Album of the Year	Nominated
2011	Recovery (as producer)	Album of the Year	Nominated
2012	"Far Away" (as producer)	Best R&B Song	Nominated
2014	Good Kid, M.A.A.D City (as producer)	Album of the Year	Nominated
2017	Lemonade (as producer)	Album of the Year	Nominated
2022	"We Win" (as producer)	Best Contemporary Christian Music Performance/Song	Nominated
