= Double Up (Mase album) =

Studio album by Mase
- Released: June 15, 1999
- Genre: Hip hop
- Length: 64:23
- Label: Bad Boy; Arista
- Producer: Buckwild; Sean Combs; D-Dot; Andreao "Fanatic" Heard; Robert "Shim" Kirkland; Ron "Amen-Ra" Lawrence; Mase; Nashiem Myrick; Harve Pierre; Righteous Funk Boogie; Daven Vanderpool

Mase chronology
Harlem World (1997)	Double Up (1999)	Welcome Back (2004)

Singles from Double Up
- 1. "Get Ready" Released: May 25, 1999

Double Up is the second studio album by American rapper Mase. It was released on June 15, 1999, by Bad Boy Records and Arista Records. Mase reunited with many of his previous collaborators on Double Up, including Sean Combs, Ron "Amen-Ra" Lawrence, and Deric "D-Dot", Angelettie, while also bringing in new contributions from Andreao "Fanatic" Heard, Daven "Prestige" Vanderpool, Nashiem Myrick, Robert "Shim" Kirkland, Righteous Funk Boogie, Buckwild, and Mario Winans.

The album received mostly mixed reviews from music critics, with some ranking it among the best hip-hop albums of the year, while others deemed it inferior to Harlem World. Commercially, the album failed to reprise the success of his debut: it opened and peaked at number 11 on the US Billboard 200 and was certified gold by the Recording Industry Association of America (RIAA) exactly one month after its release on July 15, 1999. Two months before the release, Mase announced his retirement from rapping to become a Christian pastor. Thus, Double Up would mark his latest release until 2004's Welcome Back.

== Background ==
Mase's debut album Harlem World (1997) opened at number one on the US Billboard 200, selling over 270,000 copies in its first week and later going 4× Platinum. Chiefly produced by Bad Boy Records's rooster of frequent collaborators or inhouse producers D-Dot, The Hitmen, Stevie J., Ron "Amen-Ra" Lawrence, and Chucky Thompson, the album spawned three consecutive top ten hits, including like "Feel So Good", "What You Want" and "Lookin' at Me." Also in 1997, Mase was also featured on tracks with Bad Boy head Puff Daddy as well as Mariah Carey ("Honey"), Brian McKnight ("You Should Be Mine"), and Brandy ("Top of the World"). For his next project with Bad Boy, Mase reteamed with the majority of his former collaborators, with additional help from Andreao "Fanatic" Heard, Buckwild, Daven "Prestige" Vanderpool, Nashiem Myrick, and Mario Winans.

== Critical reception ==
Professional ratings
Review scores
Source	Rating
AllMusic	4/5 stars
Entertainment Weekly	B+
Q	3/5 stars
Rolling Stone	2/5 stars
The Source	2.5/5 stars
The Village Voice	(dud)

AllMusic editor Stephen Thomas Erlewine called Double Up a "good sequel to a promising debut [that] pretty much recycles the same hooktastic pop-rap formulas as Harlem World, following Puff Daddy's design of borrowing the best, regardless of the source, and turning it into radio-ready party music. While this is pleasing to the ear, it tends to be a little monotonous and too predictable, especially when compared to Mase's raps." Similarly, Entertainment Weekly's Tom Sinclair wrote: "In the grand tradition of his mentor, Puff Daddy, Mase cannily packs his tracks with can’t-miss samples for maximum ear appeal. But it’s his words, delivered with chilling, methodical clarity, that cut deepest. His disenchantment with hip-hop hypocrisy is a recurring theme, and his holy dissatisfaction is wholly convincing."

BBC News wrote: "If this really is it, then in Double Up he has left a lasting legacy, with his use of beats and samples as fresh and innovative as ever [...] And what an album it is – maybe not quite as tight as Harlem World, but certainly up there with Eminem as one of the hip hop compositions of the year." Less impressed, Kris Ex from Rolling Stone declared the album a "predictable collection of richer-than-thou tales of girls, jewels and cars, and woe-is-me lamentations of jealously, back-stabbing and alienation. In trying to distance himself from Puff Daddy, Mase has fallen well short of his former Svengeli's slick standardes – you can't even dance to Double Up." XXL later referred to the album as his weakest release.

== Commercial performance ==
Double Up debuted and peaked at number eleven the US Billboard 200 and number two on the Top R&B/Hip-Hop Albums chart, selling 107,000 copies in its first week. It was a considerable decline from his previous album Harlem World, which had debuted with twice as many units sold. On July 15, 1999, Double Up was certified Gold by the Recording Industry Association of America (RIAA). In January 2009, Billboard reported that the album had sold 425,000 copies domestically, making it Mase's lowest-selling album to date.

== Track listing ==
Double Up track listing
No.	Title	Writer(s)	Producer(s)	Length
1.	"Puff Daddy (Intro)"	Mason Betha; Mario Winans	Winans	0:59
2.	"Stay Out of My Way" (featuring Total)	Mason Betha; Ron "Amen-Ra" Lawrence; Sean Combs; James Boxley; Carlton Ridenhour; Eric Sadler; Madonna Ciccone; Lenny Kravitz; Ingrid Chavez	Lawrence; Combs	3:49
3.	"Get Ready" (featuring Blackstreet)	Betha; Andreao "Fanatic" Heard; N. Sylvers; Charmaine Sylvers; Dana Meyers	Heard; Combs	4:20
4.	"Make Me Cry"	Betha; Harve "Joe Hooker" Pierre; Sean "Face" Foote; Christine McVie	Pierre; Foote	4:14
5.	"Awards Show" (Interlude)	Betha	Mase	1:48
6.	"Same Niggas"	Betha; Nashiem Myrick; Bruce Hornsby	Myrick	5:19
7.	"No Matter What"	Betha; Daven "Prestige" Vanderpool; Combs; Gary Numan	Vanderpool; Combs	3:57
8.	"If You Want to Party"	Betha; Vanderpool; Grace Jones	Vanderpool	4:05
9.	"Jail Visit" (Interlude)	Betha	Mase	2:04
10.	"Fuck Me, Fuck You" (featuring Mysonne)	Betha; Deric "D-Dot" Angelettie; Combs; E. Simmons; Ennio Morricone	Angelettie; Combs	4:14
11.	"Do It Again" (featuring Puff Daddy)	Betha; Vanderpool; Combs; Stuart Argabright; Ken Lockie	Vanderpool; Combs	3:21
12.	"Another Story to Tell"	Betha; Anthony Best; Brian Holland; Eddie Holland	Buckwild	3:07
13.	"Blood is Thicker"	Betha	Righteous Funk Boogie	4:02
14.	"You Ain't Smart"	Betha; Myrick; Combs	Myrick; Combs	4:08
15.	"All I Ever Wanted"	Betha; Myrick; Lee Oskar; Keri Oskar; Greg Errico	Myrick	4:02
16.	"Mad Rapper" (Interlude)	Angelettie	Angelettie	0:35
17.	"From Scratch" (featuring Shyne, Harlem World & Mysonne)	Betha; Winans; Jamal Barrows; Chaunvey Hawkins; Ameen Burns; Mysonne Linen	Winans	4:36
18.	"Gettin' It" (featuring Funkmaster Flex)	Betha; Barrows; Robert "Shim" Kirkland	Kirkland	0:56
Total length:				64:23

Sample credits

- "Stay Out of My Way" contains replayed elements from "Joy" by Public Enemy and "Justify My Love" by Madonna.
- "Get Ready" contains excerpts from "A Night to Remember" as performed by Shalamar.
- "Make Me Cry" contains excerpts from "Oh Daddy" as performed by Fleetwood Mac.
- "Same Niggas" contains resung elements of "The Way It Is" as written and performed by Bruce Hornsby.
- "No Matter What" contains excerpts and samples from "Cars" as written and performed by Gary Numan.
- "If You Want to Party" contains replayed elements from "Feel Up" as written and performed by Grace Jones.
- "Fuck Me, Fuck You" contains excerpts and samples from "(Theme from) Untouchables" as written by Ennio Morricone.
- "Do It Again" contains replayed elements from ""The Dominatrix Sleeps Tonight" as performed by Dominatrix.
- "Another Story to Tell" contains excerpts and samples of "In the Middle of the Feeling" as performed by Three Ounces of Love.
- "All I Ever Wanted" contains excerpts and samples of "San Francisco Bay" as performed by Lee Oskar.

== Charts ==
=== Weekly charts ===
Weekly chart performance for Double Up
Chart (1999)	Peak position
Australian Albums (ARIA)	35
Dutch Albums (Album Top 100)	82
German Albums (Offizielle Top 100)	43
UK Albums (OCC)	47
US Billboard 200	11
US Top R&B/Hip-Hop Albums (Billboard)	2

=== Year-end charts ===
Year-end chart performance for Double Up
Chart (1999)	Position
US Top R&B/Hip-Hop Albums (Billboard)	95

== Certifications ==
Certifications for Double Up
Region	Certification	Certified units/sales
New Zealand (RMNZ)	Gold	7,500^{‡}
United States (RIAA)	Gold	500,000^{^}
^{^} Shipments figures based on certification alone.^{‡} Sales+streaming figures based on certification alone.
