= I Really Like It =

Single by Harlem World featuring Mase and Kelly Price

from the album The Movement
- B-side: "Meaning of Family"
- Released: 1999
- Recorded: 1998
- Genre: Hip hop
- Length: 3:53
- Label: So So Def
- Songwriters: P. Jones; S. Betha; M. Betha; Justin Smith; El DeBarge; Bunny DeBarge; Larry Johnson; Michael Jonzun; William DeBarge
- Producers: Mase, Just Blaze, Supa Sam

Harlem World singles chronology
"I Really Like It" (1999)	"Cali Chronic" (1999)

Mase singles chronology
"Take Me There" (1998)	"I Really Like It" (1999)	"Get Ready" (1999)

"I Really Like It" is the debut single by rap group Harlem World from their debut album, The Movement. It features the group's mentor Mase and R&B singer Kelly Price and was produced by Mase, Supa Sam and Just Blaze. the track contains a sample of "Popcorn Love" performed by New Edition and an interpolation of "I Like It" performed by DeBarge. "I Really Like It" managed to make it to 3 different Billboard charts having peaked at 61 on the Hot R&B/Hip-Hop Singles & Tracks chart, 31 on the Hot Rap Singles chart and 18 on the Rhythmic Top 40.

== Single track listing ==
=== A-side ===
1. "I Really Like It"- 3:53
2. "I Really Like It" (Instrumental)- 3:50

=== B-side ===
1. "Meaning of Family"- 4:12
2. "Meaning of Family" (Instrumental)- 4:13
