= The Movement (Harlem World album) =

Studio album by Harlem World
- Released: March 9, 1999
- Recorded: 1998
- Studio: The Hit Factory (New York City); Krosswire (Atlanta); Sweetfish (Argyle, New York)
- Genre: Hip hop
- Length: 58:54
- Label: So So Def; Columbia
- Producer: Ma$e (also exec.); Jermaine Dupri (also co-exec.); Dame Grease; Deric "D-Dot" Angelettie; Just Blaze; Kanye West; Poke and Tone; Rick Colone; Supa Sam; the Neptunes; Tim Battle

Singles from The Movement
- 1. "I Really Like It" Released: 1999; 2. "Cali Chronic" Released: 1999

Professional ratings
Review scores
Source	Rating
AllMusic	4/5 stars
Christgau's Consumer Guide	(1-star Honorable Mention)
Entertainment Weekly	C−
(The New) Rolling Stone Album Guide	1.5/5 stars
The Source	3.5/5 stars
USA Today	2.5/4 stars

The Movement is the only album by American hip hop group Harlem World. It was released on March 9, 1999, through So So Def Recordings and Columbia Records. The recording sessions took place at The Hit Factory in New York City, at Krosswire Studio in Atlanta, and at Sweetfish in Argyle, New York. The album was produced by Dame Grease, Deric "D-Dot" Angelettie, Jermaine Dupri, the Neptunes, Trackmasters, Kanye West, Just Blaze, and others. It features guest appearances from Ma$e, Carl Thomas, Drag-On, Jermaine Dupri, Nas, Nauty, Rashad, the Boys Choir of Harlem, the Teamsters, and Kelly Price. The album was a success, making it to 11 on the Billboard 200 and 5 on the Top R&B/Hip-Hop Albums and was certified gold on April 12, 1999. Two singles were spawned from the album, "I Really Like It" and "Cali Chronic". The album is now out of print.

In a 2011 interview with Complex, Just Blaze revealed that the album was the reason for his stage name, originally being a running joke between the Harlem World members when suggesting a producer name for him. It then developed to the point where they credited him on the album under the Just Blaze name. Blaze did not like the name at first, but after the album's success, eventually decided to keep the name.

== Track listing ==
No.	Title	Writer(s)	Producer(s)	Length
1.	"Intro"	Burt Bacharach; Hal David		0:56
2.	"You Made Me" (featuring Carl Thomas and Nas)	Jim Croce	Kanye West	3:50
3.	"Minute Man" (featuring Nauty)	Andre Hudson; Chauncey Hawkins; Stason Betha; Kanye West; Mason Betha; Bill Withers; Skip Scarborough	Kanye West	4:16
4.	"Crew of the Year" (featuring Ma$e)	Ameen Burns; C. Hawkins; Pierre Jones; M. Betha; Jean-Claude Olivier; Samuel Barnes	Poke and Tone	3:36
5.	"I Really Like It" (featuring Ma$e and Kelly Price)	P. Jones; S. Betha; M. Betha; Justin Smith; El DeBarge; Bunny DeBarge; Larry Johnson; Michael Jonzun; William DeBarge	Just Blaze; Mase; Supa Sam	3:44
6.	"Mamasita" (Interlude)			1:46
7.	"Across the Border" (featuring Ma$e)	A. Hudson; C. Hawkins; Michael Foster; M. Betha; Julio Colon	Rick Colone	4:12
8.	"100 Shiesty's" (featuring Drag-On)	A. Burns; Melvin Smalls; K. West; M. Betha; Gregory McCoy; James Drumgole; LeCoy Bryant; Agnes Kelly	Kanye West	3:38
9.	"Cali Chronic"	A. Burns; A. Hudson; C. Hawkins; M. Foster; Deric Angelettie; M. Betha; Andrew Noland; Gregory Webster; Walter Morrison; Leroy Bonner; Marshall Jones; Marvin Pierce; Bruce Napier; Ralph Middlebrooks	Deric "D-Dot" Angelettie	3:41
10.	"One Big Fiesta" (featuring Ma$e)	M. Foster; S. Betha; M. Betha; Chad Hugo; Pharrell Williams; Jamal Aziz; Lionel Richie	The Neptunes	3:21
11.	"Meaning of Family" (featuring The Teamsters)	A. Burns; M. Foster; M. Betha; J. Aziz; Donell Simmons; Damon Blackman	Dame Grease	4:09
12.	"My Baby's Mother's Boyfriend's Mother" (Interlude)			0:48
13.	"Not the Kids" (featuring Rashad)	A. Hudson; C. Hawkins; S. Betha; M. Betha; C. Hugo; P. Williams	The Neptunes	4:14
14.	"Family Crisis"	A. Burns; C. Hawkins; M. Foster; P. Jones; S. Betha; M. Betha; J. Smith; Samual Boateng	Just Blaze; Mase; Supa Sam	3:37
15.	"We Both Frontin'" (featuring Jermaine Dupri)	A. Hudson; C. Hawkins; M. Foster; S. Betha; Jermaine Dupri; Carl So-Lowe	Jermaine Dupri; Carl So-Lowe (co.)	3:53
16.	"Pointing Fingers"	A. Burns; A. Hudson; C. Hawkins; M. Foster; P. Jones; S. Betha; D. Blackman	Dame Grease	3:25
17.	"A Change Is Gon' Come" (featuring Boys Choir of Harlem)	Bernard Taylor; Maurice White	Tim Battle	5:48
Total length:				58:54

== Charts ==
Chart performance for The Movement
Chart (1999)	Peak position
Australian Albums (ARIA)	87
US Billboard 200	11
US Top R&B/Hip-Hop Albums (Billboard)	5

== Certifications ==
Region	Certification	Certified units/sales
United States (RIAA)	Gold	500,000^{^}
^{^} Shipments figures based on certification alone.
