= Breathe, Stretch, Shake =

Single by Mase featuring P. Diddy

from the album Welcome Back
- A-side: "Welcome Back"
- Released: September 14, 2004
- Recorded: 2004
- Genre: Hip hop
- Length: 3:17
- Label: Bad Boy; Universal
- Songwriters: Mason Betha; Ricardo Thomas
- Producer: Rick Rock

Mase singles chronology
"Welcome Back" (2004)	"Breathe, Stretch, Shake" (2004)	"Keep It On" (2004)

P. Diddy singles chronology
"You Don't Want Drama" (2004)	"Breathe, Stretch, Shake" (2004)	"What You Been Drankin' On?" (2004)

"Breathe, Stretch, Shake" is the second single released from Mase's third album, Welcome Back. It was released on September 14, 2004, produced by Rick Rock and featured P. Diddy on the chorus. "Breathe, Stretch, Shake" was slightly more successful on the Billboard charts than the album's previous single, "Welcome Back", peaking at 28 on the Billboard Hot 100. It was certified gold on June 27, 2005, just about a month after "Welcome Back" accomplished the feat.

== Music video ==
The video features Mase alongside a crew of back-up dancers, including Alyson Stoner and Adam G. Sevani, dressed in black and white in both black and white-colored backgrounds. The video was directed by Benny Boom.

== In popular culture ==
This song was also featured in the 2004 sports video game NFL Street 2 and the movie version of Fat Albert.

== Formats and track listing ==
UK 12" (promo)

- A. "Breathe, Stretch, Shake" – 3:17
- B. "Breathe, Stretch, Shake" (Instrumental) – 3:17

UK CD (promo)

- 1. "Breathe, Stretch, Shake" – 3:17

US 12"

- A1. "Welcome Back" – 4:22
- A2. "Welcome Back" (Instrumental) – 4:22
- B1. "Breathe, Stretch, Shake" (featuring P. Diddy) – 3:17
- B2. "Breathe, Stretch, Shake" (Instrumental) – 3:17

US 12" (promo)

- A1. "Breathe, Stretch, Shake" (featuring P.Diddy) – 3:17
- A2. "My Harlem Lullaby" – 3:54
- B1. "Welcome Back" – 4:22
- B2. Keep It On" – 3:34

US CD (promo)

- 1. "Breathe, Stretch, Shake" – 3:17
- 2. "Breathe, Stretch, Shake" (Instrumental) – 3:17

== Charts ==
=== Weekly charts ===
Chart (2004)	Peak position
Scotland Singles (OCC); With "Welcome Back"	60
Switzerland (Schweizer Hitparade)	41
UK Singles (OCC); With "Welcome Back"	29
UK Hip Hop/R&B (OCC); With "Welcome Back"	12
US Billboard Hot 100	28
US Hot R&B/Hip-Hop Songs (Billboard)	12
US Hot Rap Songs (Billboard)	7
US Rhythmic Airplay (Billboard)	17

=== Year-end charts ===
Chart (2004)	Position
UK Urban (Music Week) "Welcome Back" / "Breathe, Stretch, Shake"	7
US Hot R&B/Hip-Hop Songs (Billboard)	74

== Certifications ==
Region	Certification	Certified units/sales
United States (RIAA)	Gold	500,000^{*}
^{*} Sales figures based on certification alone.

== Release history ==
Region	Date	Format(s)	Label(s)	Ref.
United States	October 11, 2004	Contemporary hit radio	Bad Boy, Universal	
