= Welcome Back (Mase album) =

Studio album by Mase
- Released: August 24, 2004
- Genre: Hip hop
- Length: 49:30
- Labels: Bad Boy; Universal
- Producers: Brass 'n Blues; Chad Hamilton; Park Jin-Young; Tyrice Jones; The Movement; Ryan Presson; Rick Rock

Mase chronology
Double Up (1999)	Welcome Back (2004)

Singles from Welcome Back
- 1. "Welcome Back" Released: May 25, 2004; 2. "Breathe, Stretch, Shake" Released: September 14, 2004; 3. "Keep It On" Released: 2004

Welcome Back is the third studio album by American rapper Mase. It was released on August 24, 2004, by Bad Boy Records and Universal Records. His first album since 1999's Double Up, Welcome Back was conceived after a five-year break spent pursuing religion. Mase consulted a variety of musicians to work with him on the album, including Rick Rock, Tyrice Jones, Brass 'n Blues, Park Jin-Young, Chad Hamilton, and Ryan Presson as well as James Bunton and Corron Cole from The Movement.

The album debuted at number four on the US Billboard 200, selling 188,000 copies in the first week. The album received gold certification by the Recording Industry Association of America (RIAA), signifying sales of 559,000 copies in the United States. Welcome Back was preceded by its same-titled lead single, which samples the Welcome Back, Kotter theme song. This was Mase's first album to not have a Parental Advisory warning, and his first official studio release since 1999's Double Up.

== Background ==
In June 1999, Mase released his second album, Double Up, on Bad Boy and Arista Records. The album sold 107,000 copies in its first week, debuting at number 11 on the US Billboard 200 and was certified gold by the Recording Industry Association of America (RIAA) exactly one month after its release on July 15, 1999. Two months before the release, Mase announced his retirement from rapping to become a Christian pastor. After a five-year break spent pursuing religion, he announced in summer 2004 that he would release a new album, Welcome Back, via Fo’ Reel Entertainment and Bad Boy.

== Promotion ==
Welcome Back was preceded by its same-titled lead single which samples "Welcome Back," the theme song to the 1970s sitcom Welcome Back, Kotter. The song peaked at number 32 on the US Billboard Hot 100 and number eight on the Hot Rap Songs chart. Released to international success, it also peaked at number four on the New Zealand Singles Chart, while also reaching number 25 in Switzerland and number 29 in the United Kingdom..

== Critical reception ==
Professional ratings
Aggregate scores
Source	Rating
Metacritic	57/100
Review scores
Source	Rating
AllMusic	3/5 stars
Blender	3/5 stars
Entertainment Weekly	B−
HipHopDX	2.5/5 stars
PopMatters	5/10 stars
RapReviews	5.5/10
Rolling Stone	2/5 stars
Tiny Mix Tapes	4/5 stars
USA Today	2.5/4 stars

Welcome Back received mixed reviews from music critics. At Metacritic, which assigns a normalized rating out of 100 to reviews from professional publications, the album received an average score of 57, based on 11 reviews. Tiny Mix Tapes wrote that "fortunately, Mase does us one better by dusting the magnetic dust off the microphone and showing us that he can still hang with the rest of the industry. The style hasn't changed, the lyrics haven't suffered, and the charm and charisma is still clearly evident." Fiore Raymond from Entertainment Weekly concluded that "the newly redeemed MC hasn't given up preaching completely; and righteousness is most un-Welcome." Billboard complimented songs such as "Welcome Back" and "Breathe, Stretch, Shake" that recalled "Mase's earlier material. Unfortunately, the rest of the album isn't nearly as catchy. Songs like "Do You Remember" and "Wasting My Time" are tolerable but don't require repeated listening."

AllMusic's David Jeffries said, "Welcome Back runs out of steam toward the end, and spreading out some of the "don't sleep on this" material from the beginning would've worked wonders. It makes this the least necessary Mase album, but half the tracks point to a future that is brighter than ever." Jon Caramanica, writing for Rolling Stone, found that Mase's delivery was lacking in quality after years away from the rap game and focusing on religion. Kelefa Sanneh from The New York Times said that despite the production in "Breathe, Stretch, Shake" and "Do You Remember" giving him support to lace his flow on the beat, he felt Mase's religious outlook held him back when delivering "lousy similes" about the Bible and brushing women and former friends aside without a response, calling Welcome Back "a surprisingly tepid collection that might have benefited from a bit more preaching, or at least a bit more passion."

== Commercial performance ==
Welcome Back debuted and peaked at number four on the US Billboard 200 and number three on the Top R&B/Hip-Hop Albums chart, selling 188,000 copies in its first week of release. On November 1, 2004, Welcome Back was certified Gold by the Recording Industry Association of America (RIAA). By January 2009, Billboard reported that the album had sold 559,000 units domestically.

== Track listing ==
Welcome Back track listing
No.	Title	Writer(s)	Producer(s)	Length
1.	"Welcome Back"	John Sebastian	The Movement	4:22
2.	"Breathe, Stretch, Shake"	Mason Betha; Ricardo Thomas	Rick Rock	3:17
3.	"Keep It On"	Betha; Tyrice Jones; Preston Glass; Narada Michael Walden	Jones	3:34
4.	"My Harlem Lullaby"	Betha; James "JB" Bunton; Corron Cole	The Movement	3:54
5.	"I Owe"	Betha; Thomas	Rock	3:49
6.	"Wasting My Time"	Betha; Samuel Gerongco; Robert Gerongco	Brass 'n Blues	4:01
7.	"Gotta Survive"	Betha; Cole; Erica Dymakkus	The Movement	4:42
8.	"The Love You Need" (featuring Rashad)	Betha; Park Jin-Young	Jin-Young; The Movement^{[a]}	4:06
9.	"Money Comes and Goes"	Betha; Chad Hamilton; Ryan Presson; Gregg Perry; Sidney Barnes; Steve Stein	Hamilton; Presson	4:16
10.	"I Wanna Go"	Betha; Jones; Gerry Goffin; Michael Masser	Jones	3:52
11.	"Into What You Say"	Betha; Thomas	Rock	4:04
12.	"Do You Remember" (featuring Cardan)	Betha; Cole; Dymakkus	The Movement	5:01
Total length:				49:30

Notes

- ^{^[a]} signifies co-producers

Sample credits

- "Welcome Back" samples from "Welcome Back Kotter" as written and performed by John Sebastian.
- "Keep It On" interpolates from "We Don't Have to Take Our Clothes Off" as written by Preston Glass and Narada Michael Walden.
- "My Harlem Lullaby" interpolates from "La Isla Bonita" as written by Madonna, Patrick Leonard, and Bruce Gaitsch.
- "Money Comes and Goes" contains samples from "How's Your Love Life Baby" as performed by Eddie Kendricks.
- "I Wanna Go" contains interpolations from "Theme from Mahogany (Do You Know Where You're Going To)" as performed by Diana Ross.

== Charts ==
=== Weekly charts ===
Weekly chart performance for Welcome Back
Chart (2004)	Peak position
Australian Albums (ARIA)	68
Canadian Albums (Billboard)	10
Canadian R&B Albums (Nielsen SoundScan)	12
French Albums (SNEP)	165
German Albums (Offizielle Top 100)	71
New Zealand Albums (RMNZ)	29
Swiss Albums (Schweizer Hitparade)	65
UK Albums (Official Charts)	68
UK R&B Albums (Official Charts)	10
US Billboard 200	4
US Top R&B/Hip-Hop Albums (Billboard)	3

=== Year-end charts ===
Year-end chart performance for Welcome Back
Chart (2004)	Position
US Billboard 200	152
US Top R&B/Hip-Hop Albums (Billboard)	73

== Certifications ==
Certifications for Welcome Back
Region	Certification	Certified units/sales
United States (RIAA)	Gold	500,000^{^}
^{^} Shipments figures based on certification alone.
