= Just the Way You Like It (song) =

Single by Tasha Holiday featuring Mase

from the album Just the Way You Like It
- Released: February 18, 1997
- Recorded: 1996
- Genre: R&B; hip hop
- Length: 4:38 (album version); 3:55 (single edit)
- Label: MCA
- Songwriters: Steven Jordan; Kelly Price
- Producers: Steven Jordan; Kelly Price; Clarence Emery

Tasha Holiday singles chronology
"Just the Way You Like It" (1997)	"So Real, So Right" / "Just One Night" (1997)

Mase singles chronology
"Can't Nobody Hold Me Down" (1997)	"Just the Way You Like It" (1997)	"Mo Money Mo Problems" (1997)

"Just the Way You Like It" is a song performed by American R&B singer Tasha Holiday, issued as the lead single from her debut album of the same name. The song features a rap from American hip hop musician Mase; and it was Holiday's only song to chart on the Billboard Hot 100, peaking at #93 in 1997.

The song contains samples of "School Boy Crush" by Average White Band and "The Breaks" by Kurtis Blow.

== Music video ==
The official music video for the song was directed by Lara M. Schwartz.

== Chart positions ==
Chart (1997)	Peak position
US Billboard Hot 100	93
US Hot R&B/Hip-Hop Singles & Tracks (Billboard)	29
