= Tasha Holiday =

- Born: 1977 or 1978 (age 48–49); Atlantic City, New Jersey, United States
- Genres: R&B
- Years active: 1990s
- Label: MCA

Tasha Holiday is an American contemporary R&B singer who was signed to MCA Records in the 1990s. Her biggest success was with the single "Just the Way You Like It" which peaked in the top thirty of the Billboard R&B singles chart, and became one of BET's most played music videos. Billboard Magazine called her album Just the Way You Like It "a promising debut". She also sang vocals on the single "Don't You Worry" by reggae artist Ruffa.

In 2006, she appeared on the track "Life So Real" (with Da Unknown) on the Lil' O album Neva Lay Down Vol. 1 [Explicit].

In 2011, she worked with producer Mike Nitty and a single, "I Used To Love You" was released on YouTube on June 22, 2011. They also premiered a song "They Want Me to Stop" earlier that year.

In 2014, two more collaborations between Nitty and Holiday were released ("Stop Playin'" and "Can't Stop Runnin'") on Nitty's SoundCloud account. The following year, she collaborated with Nookie on the song "Dreams."

== Discography ==
=== Albums ===
==== Studio albums ====
- Just the Way You Like It (1997)

==== EPs ====
- The Acapellas (EP) (1996)

=== Singles ===
Year	Single	Peak positions		Album
Year	Single	Hot R&B/Hip-Hop Singles & Tracks	Billboard Hot 100	Album
1996	"Just the Way You Like It"	26	93	Just the Way You Like It
1997	"So Real, So Right" / "Just One Night"	100	—	Just the Way You Like It
