= Just the Way You Like It (Tasha Holiday album) =

Studio album by Tasha Holiday
- Released: March 25, 1997
- Genre: R&B
- Length: 37:14
- Label: MCA
- Producer: Hank Shocklee (exec.)

Tasha Holiday chronology
'The Acapellas' (1996)	Just the Way You Like It (1997)

Singles from Just the Way You Like It
- 1. "Just the Way You Like It" Released: February 18, 1997; 2. "So Real, So Right/Just One Night" Released: June 24, 1997

Professional ratings
Review scores
Source	Rating
AllMusic	4/5 stars
USA Today	2/4 stars

Just the Way You Like It is the only full-length studio album by American R&B singer Tasha Holiday (following her debut EP, The Acapellas). Released March 25, 1997 via MCA Records, the album did not chart on the Billboard 200 but it peaked at #91 on the Billboard R&B chart.

Two singles were released from the album: "Just the Way You Like It" and "So Real, So Right" / "Just One Night". "Just the Way You Like It" was Holiday's only song to chart on the Billboard Hot 100, peaking at #93 in 1997.

== Track listing ==
No.	Title	Writer(s)	Producer(s)	Length
1.	"So Real, So Right"	Evan Rogers	Carl Sturken; Evan Rogers	4:23
2.	"Just One Night" ( (Note: "Just One Night" contains a sample of "You Can't Turn Me Away" as performed by Sylvia Striplin.))	James Bedford; Roy Ayers; Steven Jordan; Sylvia Striplin; Kelly Price	Steven Jordan; Kelly Price	4:02
3.	"Don't Go Away" ( (Note: "Don't Go Away" contains a sample of "Sukiyaki" as performed by A Taste of Honey.))	Keneon Isaac	Keneon Isaac	4:42
4.	"Just the Way You Like It" (featuring Mase (Note: "Just the Way You Like It" contains samples of "School Boy Crush" as performed by Average White Band and "The Breaks" as performed by Kurtis Blow.))	Steven Jordan; Kelly Price	Steven Jordan; Kelly Price; Clarence Emery	3:50
5.	"I Wanna Get to Know You"	Joseph Priolo; Errol Johnson; Carl Carr	Bacarde; Carl Carr	3:15
6.	"I Want You Mine"	Errol Johnson; Joseph Priolo	Bacarde; Carl Carr	3:48
7.	"Can't Fight It"	Keneon Isaac	Keneon Isaac	5:08
8.	"Give It to Me"	Errol Johnson; Joseph Priolo	Joseph Priolo; Bacarde	3:32
9.	"Here We Go Again"	Carl Sturken; Evan Rogers	Carl Sturken; Evan Rogers	4:40
10.	"Love Never Questions Why"	Carl Sturken; Evan Rogers	Carl Sturken; Evan Rogers	4:20
11.	"This Love"	Errol Johnson; Joseph Priolo	Errol Johnson; Joseph Priolo	3:29
Total length:				37:14

== Chart positions ==
Chart (1997)	Peak position
US R&B Albums (Billboard)	91
