= Harlem World (group) =

American hip hop group

- Harlem World and Mase circa 1999 left to right: Meeno, Blinky Blink, Mase, Huddy, Cardan, Baby Stase and Loon

Background information
- Origin: New York City, U.S.
- Genre: Hip hop
- Years active: 1995–1999
- Label: So So Def / Columbia
- Members: Baby Stase; Blinky Blink; Cardan; Huddy (deceased); Loon; Meeno; Suga J

Harlem World was an American hip hop group founded by Mase that was signed to Jermaine Dupri's So So Def. The group originally consisted of six members: Baby Stase (Stason Betha, Mase's twin sister), Blinky Blink (Michael Foster), Cardan (Pierre Jones), Huddy (Andre Hudson), Meeno (Ameeno Burns), and Loon (Chauncey Hawkins). After a falling out with Mase, group member Cardan was removed from the group and replaced by Suga J (Jay Dingle). They released their first and only album, The Movement on March 9, 1999, which went to #11 on the Billboard 200 and was certified gold the following month. Despite the success of the album, the group disbanded later in the year with their last appearance being Mase's "From Scratch" on his second album, Double Up.

On October 13, 2010, member Huddy was killed in an early morning traffic accident on the George Washington Bridge in New York City.

== Discography ==
=== Studio album ===
Year	Title	Chart positions		Certifications (sales thresholds)
Year	Title	U.S.	U.S. R&B	Certifications (sales thresholds)
1999	The Movement: Released: March 9, 1999; Label: So So Def	11	5	US: Gold

=== Singles ===
Year	Single	Chart positions		Album
Year	Single	U.S. R&B	U.S. Rap	Album
1999	"I Really Like It" (featuring Mase and Kelly Price)	61	31	The Movement
1999	"Cali Chronic" (featuring Snoop Dogg)	87	–	The Movement
