= Mase =

American rapper (born 1975)

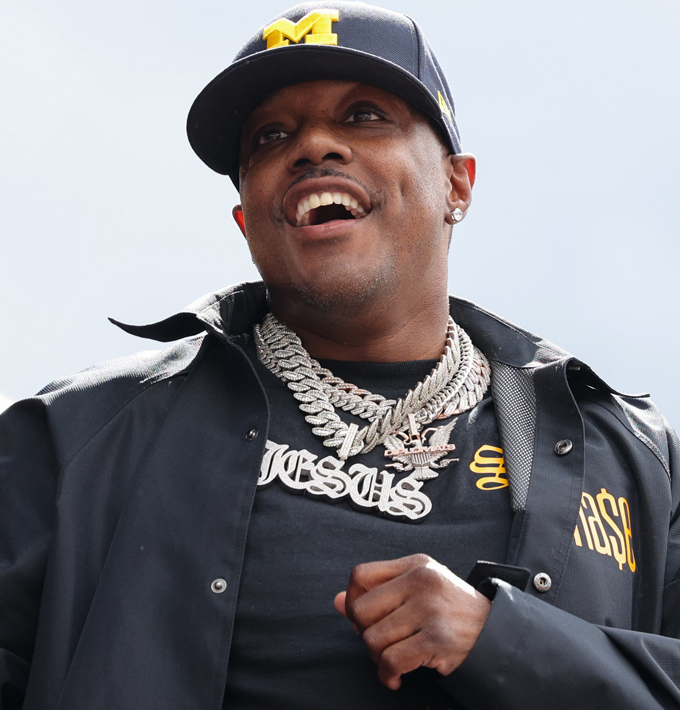
- Mase in 2024

Background information
- Also known as: Ma$e; Murda Mase
- Born: Mason Durell Betha; August 27, 1975 (age 51); Jacksonville, Florida, U.S.
- Origin: New York City, U.S.
- Genre: East Coast hip-hop
- Occupations: Rapper; songwriter
- Works: Discography
- Years active: 1993–present
- Labels: RichFish; Westside; Bad Boy; Arista; Universal; Atlantic
- Formerly of: Children of the Corn; Harlem World

Mason Durell Betha (born August 27, 1975), known professionally as Mase (often stylized as Ma$e), is an American rapper. Best known for his work with Sean "Puff Daddy" Combs's Bad Boy Records, he signed with the label in 1996 and quickly found mainstream recognition as Combs's hype man. He guest appeared on Combs's 1997 single "Can't Nobody Hold Me Down", which peaked atop the Billboard Hot 100, while his first two singles as a lead artist, "Feel So Good" (featuring Kelly Price) and "What You Want" (featuring Total), both peaked in the chart's top ten. Released in October of that year, his debut studio album, Harlem World (1997), peaked atop the Billboard 200 chart, was certified quadruple platinum by the Recording Industry Association of America (RIAA), and spawned his third top-ten single as a lead artist, "Lookin' at Me" (featuring Combs). His guest performances on labelmate the Notorious B.I.G.'s single "Mo Money Mo Problems" and Combs's "Been Around the World" peaked at numbers one and two on the Billboard Hot 100, respectively, that same year.

Mase also performed as part of the hip hop group Children of the Corn, which he formed in 1993 with fellow New York City-based rappers including Cam'ron and Big L. Two years later, he founded the hip hop group Harlem World, which signed with Jermaine Dupri's So So Def Recordings. The group's only album, The Movement (1999), and Mase's second album, Double Up (1999), both peaked at number 11 on the Billboard 200. The latter preceded a five-year recording hiatus, during which Mase began a separate career as a Christian pastor. He returned to recording with his third album, Welcome Back (2004). It peaked at number four on the chart and spawned the top 40 singles "Welcome Back" and "Breathe, Stretch, Shake" (featuring Puff Daddy).

Despite receiving gold certifications from the RIAA, both albums were met with mixed critical reception and he parted ways with Bad Boy after the latter; his subsequent releases have been few and far between, and each has failed to chart. Mase has founded the record label RichFish Records, through which he signed rapper Fivio Foreign in 2019. During Combs's sexual misconduct allegations and criminal trials from 2024 to 2025, Mase spoke of his previous falling out and dissociation with Combs due to suspected concerns, calling Combs's legal woes "payback".

== Early life ==
Mason Durell Betha was born in Jacksonville, Florida, on August 27, 1975, as a fraternal twin born almost two months premature, to P. K. and Mason Betha. He grew up with two brothers and three sisters, including his twin sister, Stason, born a few minutes after him. Their father left the family when Mase was just three years old. In 1980, his mother moved with her children to Harlem, New York, where Mase spent the majority of his childhood. During his early teenage years, Betha began getting into trouble on the streets of Harlem, and when he was 13 his mother sent him back to Jacksonville to live with relatives. It was while living in Jacksonville that Betha first began attending church. After returning to live in Harlem at age 15, Betha began showing promise as a basketball player, becoming the leading point guard for his team at Manhattan Center High School during the 1993 season, where he played alongside Cameron Giles, who went on to be known as the rapper Cam'ron. He had hopes of joining the National Basketball Association (NBA), but was unable to make it into a Division I school due to his poor academic scores. He attended State University of New York at Purchase, where he grew to realize he was unlikely to make the NBA and instead began focusing more on writing music, producing demo tapes, and regularly performing at local nightclubs. Betha eventually dropped out of college and focused on his music career full-time.

== Career ==
=== 1993–1997: Children of the Corn and Bad Boy record deal ===
After Betha returned to Harlem, he and his childhood friend Cam'ron began rapping as a hobby under the names Murda Mase and Killa Cam, briefly forming a group known as the Children of the Corn ("corn" short for "corner") with fellow Harlem rappers Big L, Herb McGruff, Six Figga Digga and Bloodshed. Damon Dash, a fellow Manhattan Center student, was the group's manager for a while. In 1996, Mase's sister Stason introduced him to Cudda Love, a road manager for the Notorious B.I.G. Cudda took then 20-year-old Mase to Atlanta, Georgia, where Jermaine Dupri and Sean Combs were attending a rap convention. Shortly after meeting and rapping for Puff Daddy at the Hard Rock Café, Mase signed a $250,000 deal with Bad Boy Records. Within a week of signing to the label, Betha had his stage name shortened from Murda Mase to simply Mase to make him more marketable and was featured on and in the video for 112's "Only You" with the Notorious B.I.G. He also appeared on numerous hit songs with other Bad Boy artists, including Puff Daddy's "Can't Nobody Hold Me Down" and "Been Around the World" and the Notorious B.I.G.'s "Mo' Money, Mo' Problems", which reached No. 1 on the Billboard Hot 100.

=== 1997–1998: Harlem World ===
Mase's first studio album, Harlem World, debuted at No. 1 on the Billboard Pop and R&B LP charts, selling over 270,000 copies in the U.S. during its first week of release. It has since achieved 4× Platinum status in the United States. The album spawned hit singles such as "Feel So Good" and "Lookin' at Me", which both reached No. 1 on the Rap Billboard charts, as well as "What You Want", which peaked at No. 3 on both the Rap and R&B Billboard charts. During 1997, Mase also appeared on songs with Puff Daddy, Mariah Carey's "Honey", Brian McKnight's "You Should Be Mine (Don't Waste Your Time)", and Brandy's "Top of the World".

In 1998, Mase formed his own record label, All Out Records. He signed his group Harlem World, which included his twin sister, Stason, to the label while they were also under So So Def Recordings. He and Harlem World member Blinky Blink were featured on Blackstreet & Mýa's song "Take Me There", which appeared on the soundtrack of The Rugrats Movie, he also had a guest appearance on DMX album It's Dark and Hell Is Hot on the final track of the album "Niggaz Done Started Something".

=== 1999: Double Up and retirement ===
Mase's second album, Double Up, was released in 1999 on Bad Boy and sold 107,000 copies in its first week, debuting at No. 11 on the US Top 200 chart. Double Up's lyrics are aggressive.

During an April 20, 1999, interview with Funkmaster Flex on New York radio station Hot 97, Mase announced his retirement from music to pursue a "calling from God". He said he had been "leading people, friends, kids and others down a path to hell" and was leaving to find God in his heart and follow him. He said it was time for him to serve God in "his" way, saying rap was not real and that he wanted to deal with reality and had become unhappy with what he did, no matter how much money it had made him. That year, Mase enrolled as a freshman at Clark Atlanta University, a historically black college, and began taking classes on August 19. Unlike other freshmen, Mase was permitted to live off campus and commute, but he is said to have downplayed his past as a rapper and stayed fairly low-key on campus.

=== 2004: Return to music ===
After a five-year hiatus from music, during which he became an ordained minister, Mase made his return to music with Welcome Back in summer 2004. Welcome Back was accompanied by the single "Welcome Back" and was released through Bad Boy Records on August 24, 2004, and distributed by Universal Music Group. It debuted at No. 4 in the US, selling 188,000 copies in its first week, and eventually went gold, selling 559,000 copies in the US. The album portrayed Mase's new Christian lifestyle and "cleaner" image. Mase dubbed himself "a Bad Boy gone clean" on the lead single (which samples the Welcome Back Kotter theme song). This new approach had a mixed reception. The album was not as big a commercial success as Harlem World, but the singles "Welcome Back" and "Breathe, Stretch, Shake" received moderate radio airplay and video play on BET and MTV, with the latter reaching No. 28 on the US Billboard Hot 100. Both singles were certified gold by the RIAA.

=== 2009–present: Now We Even ===
In October 2009, Mase made an impromptu appearance on a live radio interview with Diddy-Dirty Money on V-103. He told the studio staff he brought documentation that would release him from the Bad Boy label and gave the forms to Diddy during the interview. Diddy signed the forms and announced "[Mase] has the freedom to go do whatever he wants to do." It was later revealed the forms did not end Mase's contractual obligations to the record label, but rather allowed him to appear on songs with artists from different labels.

In December 2012, Mase announced that he was no longer signed to Bad Boy, saying he would not likely sign with a major label anytime soon. He told MTV the only two labels he would consider signing with were Kanye West's GOOD Music or Drake's OVO Sound. On October 18, 2013, Mase announced his next album would be titled Now We Even. He also said his wish list for guest appearances would include Jay-Z, Sean Combs, Beyoncé, Drake, 2 Chainz, Lauryn Hill, Meek Mill, Fabolous, Ariana Grande, Dipset, Eric Bellinger, Seal and CeeLo Green.

On November 24, 2017, Mase released "The Oracle", a diss track at friend-turned-rival Cam'ron in response to the lyrical jabs Cam'ron aimed at him on his mixtape The Program.

Cam'ron and Mase started their sports talk show, It Is What It Is, on February 27, 2023. The show premiered as an online-only production on Cam'ron's YouTube channel, "Come And Talk 2 Me".

== Legacy and influence ==
Mase's melodic rap style has had an enduring influence on hip hop. Many rappers, such as Pusha T, Fabolous, and Kanye West, have adopted Mase's lazy yet melodic flow. Jay-Z and Drake, among other rappers, have quoted Mase lyrics in their songs. West called Mase as his favorite rapper ever. In an interview with DJ Vlad, former Dipset member Jim Jones said Mase taught him how to rap.

== Personal life ==
Mase has called himself a conservative and supported Donald Trump's 2024 presidential campaign.

== Writings ==
- Revelations: There's a Light After the Lime (2001)

== Discography ==
Studio albums

- Harlem World (1997)
- Double Up (1999)
- Welcome Back (2004)

Mixtapes

- 10 Years of Hate: Crucified 4 the Hood (2006)
- I Do the Impossible (2009)

== Filmography ==
Year	Title	Role	Notes
1997	All That	Himself	TV series Guest/Performer; Season 4: Episode 1
1997	Soul Train	Himself	TV series Guest/Performer; Season 27: Episode 11
2005	All Of Us	Frankie Betha	TV series Guest; Season 2: Episode 12
2017	Sandy Wexler	Himself	Netflix Movie
