= G.M.O. (Got My Own) =

Single by Mýa featuring Tink
- Released: August 31, 2018
- Genre: Trap; R&B
- Length: 3:51
- Label: Planet 9; MGM
- Songwriters: Mýa Harrison; Lamar Edwards; Trinity Home
- Producers: MyGuyMars; Resource

Mýa singles chronology
"Knock You Out" (2018)	"G.M.O. (Got My Own)" (2018)	"Open" (2019)

"G.M.O. (Got My Own)" is a song recorded by American singer Mýa. A collaborative effort, it was written and composed by Mýa, Tink and Lamar "My Guys Mars" Edwards, while production was helmed by the latter as well with additional contribution from producer Resource. Released August 31, 2018, "G.M.O. (Got My Own)" is a synth driven and bass heavy midtempo ladies club anthem song and serves as a departure from Harrison's two R&B–rooted studio projects Smoove Jones (2016) and TKO (The Knock Out) (2018).

== Background and release ==
In honor of her twentieth anniversary, Mýa released TKO (The Knock Out), her eighth studio album, thirteenth studio project overall to commemorate the release of her debut album Mýa (1998). Digitally, the release was distributed through indie distribution company, The Orchard under Sony Music. To support the album, TKO (The Knock Out) spawned several singles – "Ready for Whatever," "Ready, Part II," "You Got Me," "Damage," and "Knock You Out."

In Fall 2017, during a press run, Mýa stopped at BET and discussed to the staff at a BET Music Meeting about the music she has been making the past ten years independently. While there and at that time unbeknownst to the public, Mýa exclusively shared "G.M.O. (Got My Own)" featuring Tink and its video with the staff. The following year, in late August 2018, Mýa announced on her Instagram account "G.M.O. (Got My Own)" was available for pre-order starting August 24, 2018. "G.M.O. (Got My Own)" was officially released on August 31, 2018.

== Recording ==
Speaking on the recording process and its experience, Harrison gushed, "Recording "G.M.O." with the super talented Tink was awesome." Satisfied with Tink's performance, Harrison applauded Tink's delivery, cadence, and perspective and felt Tink elevated the song with "more swag." Harrison lauded her producers MyGuyMars and Resource as well and their contribution to the song, commenting, "they're not only musical, but they keep their ears close to the streets, is so refreshing creating the perfect balance for me with a familiar, yet original sound."

== Music video ==
Directed and produced by Dana Rice and Mýa, the two had previously collaborated on "Ready for Whatever" (2017), the visual plays like an old-school iPod advertisement in its simplistic production fashion. With only a Lambo and a few martinis on set, the predominantly black and white video features Mýa's typical choreography with small snippets of dancing silhouettes.

== Personnel ==
Credits adapted from Qobuz.

- Mýa – vocals, songwriting
- Trinity Home – songwriting
- Lamar "Mars" Edwards – composer
- Braylin "Resource" Bowman – composer

== Release history ==
Region	Date	Format	Label	Ref.
Various	August 31, 2018	Digital download; streaming	Planet 9; The Orchard	
