= List of songs recorded by Mya =

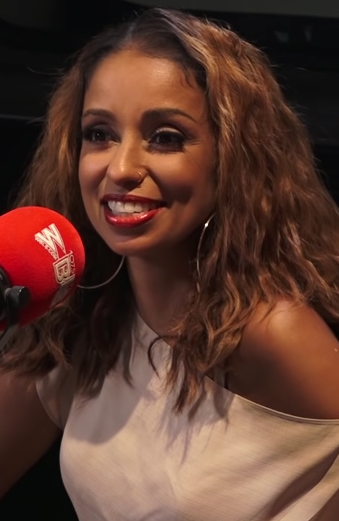
Mya in 2018.

American recording artist Mya Harrison has recorded material for her six studio albums and collaborated with other artists for duets and featured songs on their respective albums and charity singles. After signing a record contract with Interscope Records at the age of 16, Harrison began to work with producer Darryl "Day" Pearson, who co-wrote and co-produced seven out of the 13 songs on her eponymous debut album (1998). Additional contribution came from Nokio the N-Tity and Daryl Simmons, the latter of which produced the album's third single "My First Night with You", a cover version of Deborah Cox's 1995 recording, written by Award-winning musicians Babyface and Diane Warren. Previous singles "Movin' On" and "It's All About Me", both produced by Pearson, featured co-writing by Dru Hill singer Sisqó.

Harrison worked with a wider range of producers on her second album Fear of Flying (2000), including Rodney Jerkins, Wyclef Jean, Robin Thicke, and Jimmy Jam & Terry Lewis to embrace a more mature sound. Lead single "The Best of Me" was co-penned by Teron Beal, Swizz Beatz, and Jadakiss along with singers Jimmy Cozier and Mashonda, while second single "Case of the Ex" marked the singer's first collaboration with producer Tricky Stewart, who would become a frequent collaborator on future projects. As with Fear of Flying, Harrison consulted an array of producers to work on her third album Moodring (2003), including Ron Fair, Timbaland, Rockwilder, Damon Elliott, Knobody. Rapper Missy Elliott composed two tracks for the album — "My Love Is Like...Wo" and "Step". "Lady Marmalade" collaborator Pink co-wrote "Take a Picture.

Harrison's fourth studio album Liberation (2007) was developed by songwriters and producers with whom she had previously collaborated as well as different artists. Scott Storch, Stewart, and Carvin & Ivan each co-wrote and co-produced two songs out of 13, with different writers and producers, including Kwamé, J. R. Rotem, and Bryan Michael Cox also significantly contributing to the album. Sugar & Spice, Harrison's Japan-wide fifth studio album, presented a new creative direction for the singer. Production was primary handled by a variety of low—profile producers such as Arkatech Beatz, Riddim Fingaz, The Smith Bros, and Duke Williams. Harrison, took full creative control co-writing the entire album with producer Christopher Moore and served as executive producer.

== Released songs ==
Key
†	Indicates single release

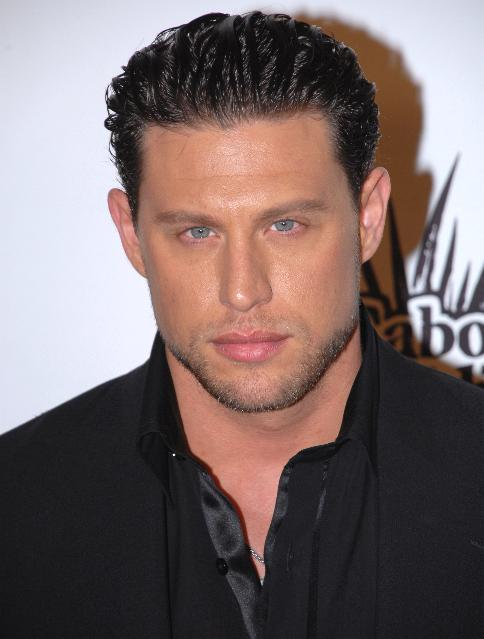
J. R. Rotem co-wrote "All in the Name of Love" on the Liberation album.

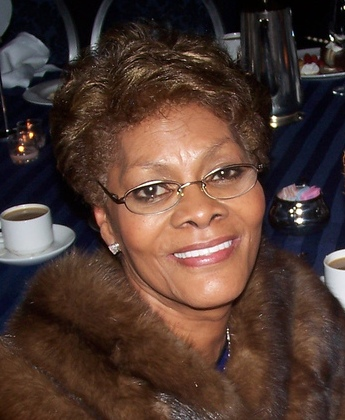
Mya appeared as a featured vocalist on Dionne Warwick's "Close to You".

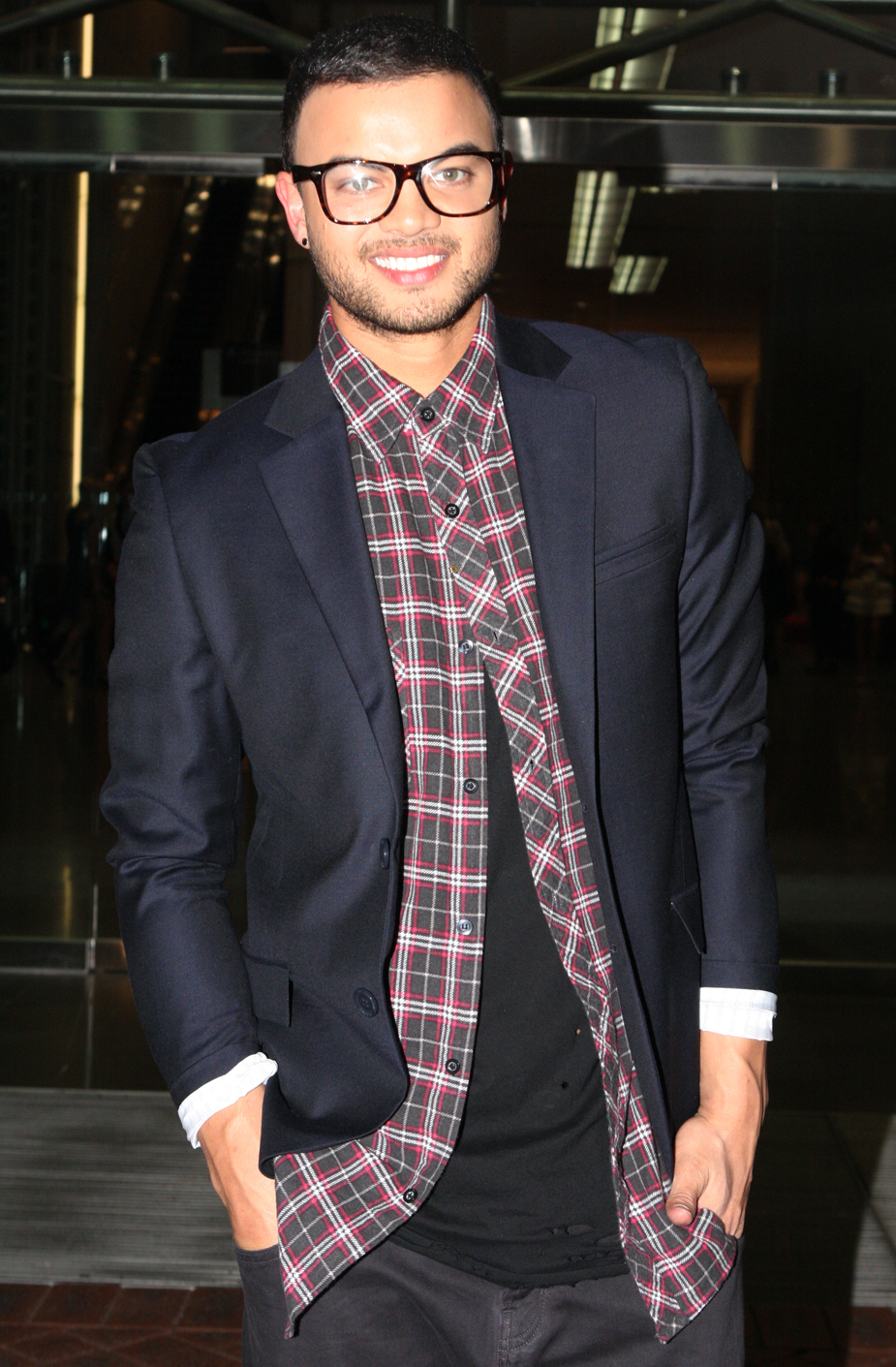
Singer Guy Sebastian wrote the duet "Forever with You", for which Mya contributed vocals.

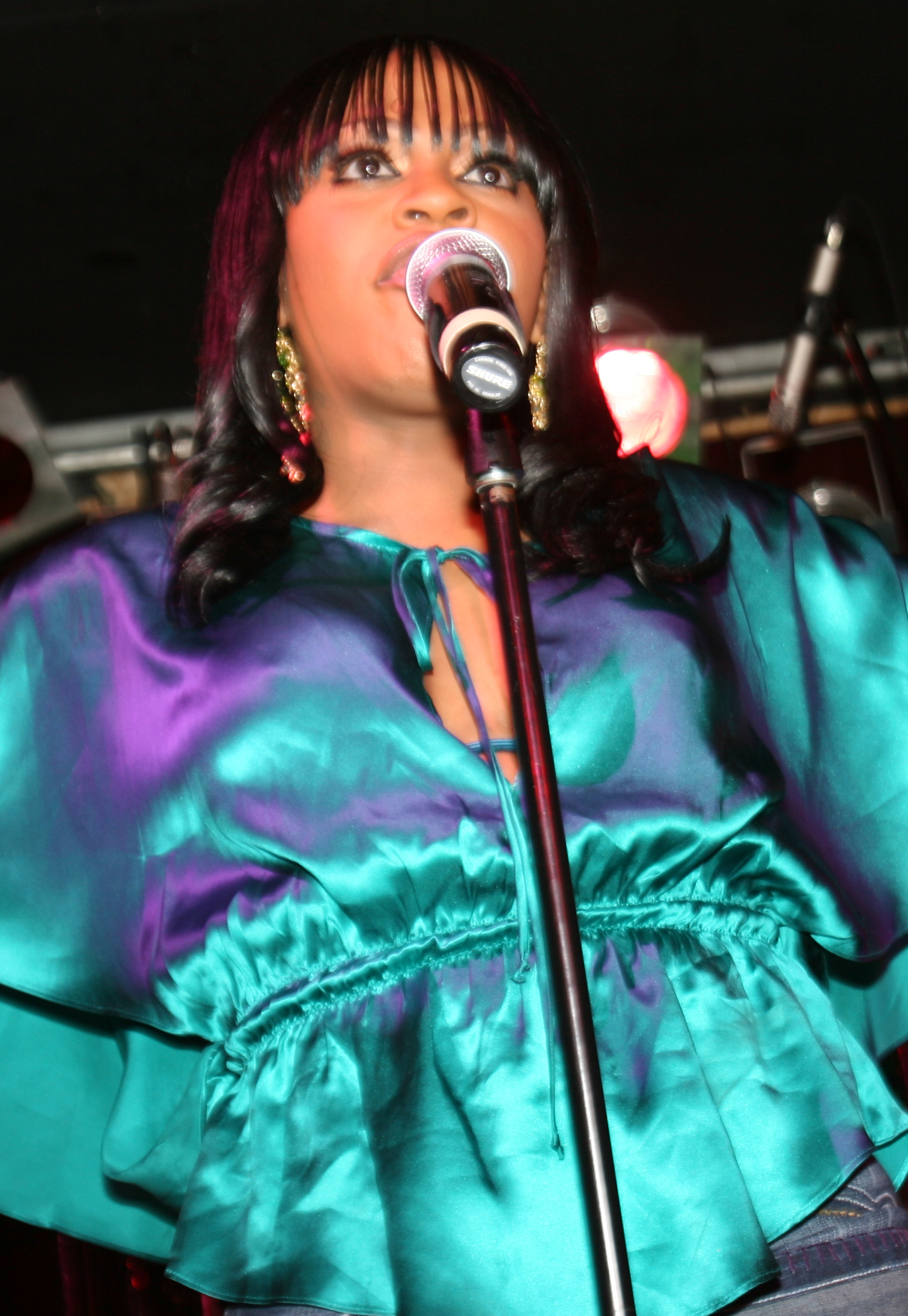
Lil' Mo co-wrote Mya's "Girls Like That", which appears on her album Fear of Flying.

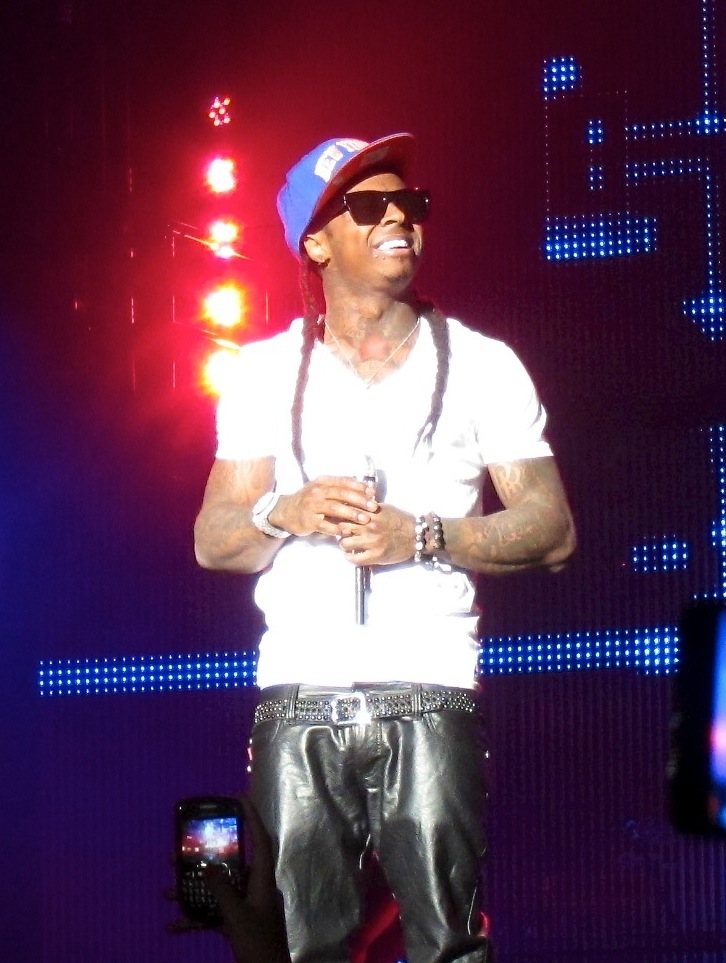
Lil Wayne co-wrote "Lock U Down", on which he appears as a featured vocalist.

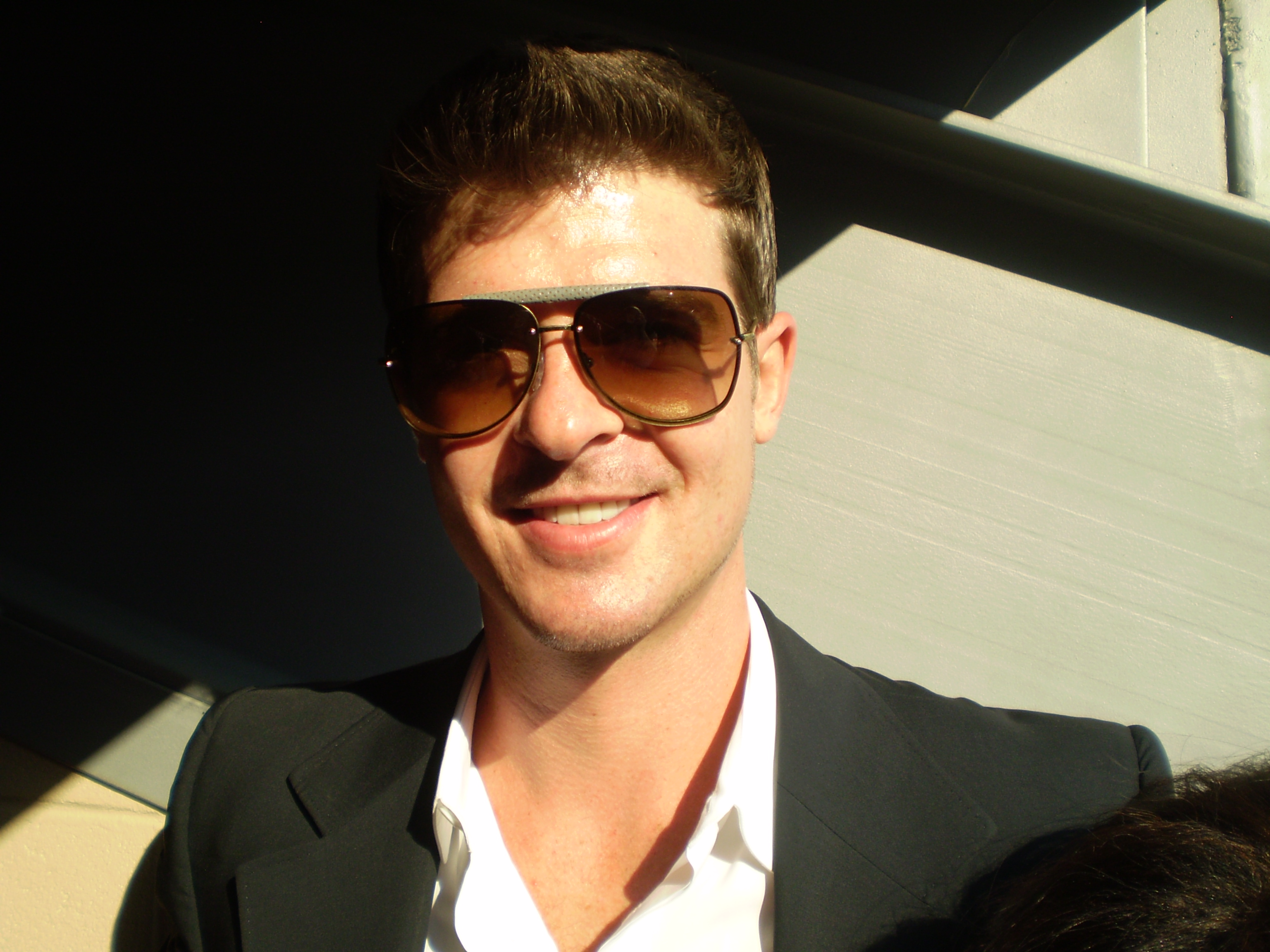
American singer-songwriter Robin Thicke co-wrote and produced several songs on Fear of Flying.

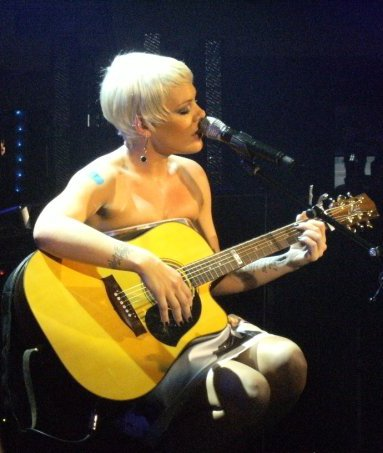
"Lady Marmalade" collaborator Pink co-wrote Moodring's "Take a Picture.

List of songs recorded by Mya
Song	Artist(s)	Writer(s)	Album(s)	Year	Ref.
"About My Bi"	Shawty Lo featuring Mya	Mya Harrison; C.Moore; S.A. Baker; Q.Jordan	Carlos	2009	
"After the Rain"	Mya	Lamont Dozier; McKinley Jackson; Teron Beal; Mya Harrison; Thealodius Reddick	Moodring	2003	
"Again and Again"	Mya	Mya Harrison; Anders Bagge; Alistair Tennant; Claudia Ogalde; Laila Bagge; Wayne Hector	Fear of Flying	2000	
"Alive"	Mya	Mya Harrison; Edwin Serrano; Deanna Christine Colon	Exclusive 2000-2010: Decade Best	2010	
"All in the Name of Love"	Mya	Mya Harrison; J.R. Rotem	Liberation	2007	
"All in Your Mind"	Mya	Mya Harrison; Christopher Moore	Sugar & Spice	2008	
"Almost Naked"	Mya	Nia Myricks; Pamela Shipp	Sugar & Spice	2008	
"Anatomy 1 on 1"	Mya	Mya Harrison; Jimmy Jam; Terry Lewis; Bobby Ross Avila; Issiah J. Avila	Moodring	2003	
"Anytime"	Mya	Mya Harrison; Michael Cox; Brooklyn Dior Sarden; Lamar Edwards; John Groover; Gabrielle Nowee	—N/a	2024	
"Anytime You Want Me"	Mya	Alex Cantrall; Joey Priolo; Carl Carr	Mya	1998	
"Ayo!"	Mya featuring DJ Kool	Chris M. Henderson; Mya Harrison; J. Bowman Jr. Charlie Smalls	non-album release	2006	
"Baby It's Yours"	Mya	Alex Cantrall; Myron Davis	Mya	1998	
"Back to Disco (70's Disco)"	Mya	Mya Harrison; Christopher Moore	Sugar & Spice	2008	
"Before U Say Goodbye"	Mya	Daisuke "D.I." Imai; Edwin Serrano; Mya Harrison	K.I.S.S.	2011	
"Black Out"	Mya	Mya Harrison	Beauty & the Streets Vol. 1	2009	
"Boss"	Mya featuring Z-Ro	Mya Harrison; Christopher Moore; Teron Beal; J. McVey	Beauty & the Streets Vol. 1	2009	
"Bum Bum"	Kevin Lyttle featuring Mya	—N/a	non-album release	2015	
"Bye Bye"	Mya featuring Missy Elliott	Mya Harrison; Darryl Pearson; Missy Elliott	Mya	1998	
"Can I"	Mya	Tyquandra "LyriqTye" Stephens; Mya Harrison	K.I.S.S. (Deluxe Edition)	2012	
"Can't Believe"	Mya	C. Higgens; Carsten Schack; Kenneth Karlin	Fear of Flying	2000	
"Case of the Ex"	Mya	Christopher Stewart; Traci Hale	Fear of Flying	2000	
"Cell Block Tango"	Various Artists	John Kander; Fred Ebb	Chicago	2002	
"Cherry Lips"	Mya	Tracey Jones; Mya Harrison; Carlton Rucker	Sweet XVI	2014	
"Circle of Life (Ol' Skoo' Joint)"	Mya	Mya Harrison; Fred "DJ" Jenkins; Damar Aaron Beckett	Smoove Jones	2016	
"Close to You"	Dionne Warwick with Mya	Burt Bacharach; Hal David	My Friends & Me	2006	
"Club Go Crazy"	Chamillionaire featuring Mya	Mya Harrison; Christopher Moore; Hakeem Seriki	Beauty & the Streets Vol. 1	2009	
"Come Together Now"	Various Artists	Damon Sharpe; Denise Rich; Sharon Stone; Mark J. Feist	non-album release	2005	
"Control Freak"	Mya featuring Gator Mane	Mya Harrison; E. Williams; K. Piper	Beauty & the Streets Vol. 1	2009	
"Convertible"	Amanda Lepore featuring Mya	—N/a	I... Amanda Lepore	2011	
"Coolin'"	Mya	Nikki Flores	Smoove Jones	2016	
"Cream Cheese"	Mya	—N/a	All About the Benjamins	2002	
"Damage"	Mya	Mya Harrison; Lindsey "Mavelle" Gilbert	TKO (The Knock Out)	2018	
"Do It"	Mya	ShaSha Jones; Cheyenne Surratt; Cliff Lewis; Mya Harrison	With Love	2014	
"Do You Only Wanna Dance"	Mya	Lester Mendez; Sy Smith	Dirty Dancing: Havana Nights	2004	
"Don't Be Afraid"	Mya	Alex Cantrall; Joey Priolo	Mya	1998	
"Down"	Mya	Mya Harrison; Shaunise "Niecy" Harris; Sydnii Raymore	TKO (The Knock Out)	2018	
"Earthquake"	Mya featuring Trina	Lindsay Fields; Cristal Brightharp; Nia Myricks; Katrina Taylor; Kevon Ford; Kris Day	K.I.S.S. (Deluxe Edition)	2012	
"Elevator"	Mya featuring Smoove Jones	Mya Harrison; Shaunice "Sha Sha" Jones; Cliff Lewis	Smoove Jones	2016	
"Ego Trippin'"	Mya	Mya Harrison; Elizabeth Wyce	Sugar & Spice	2008	
"Everything or Nothing"	Mya	Mya Harrison; Ron Fair; Randy Bugnitz	Everything or Nothing	2003	
"Evolve"	Mya	Delisha Thomas; Mya Harrison; Maurice Carpenter	K.I.S.S.	2011	
"Extacy"	Mya	Mya Harrison; Damon Elliott	Moodring	2003	
"Fabulous Life"	Mya	Mya Harrison; Jeff Miyahara; Andreas Levander; Edwin Serrano	K.I.S.S.	2011	
"Fair Xchange (Remix)"	2Pac featuring Mya	—N/a	Better Dayz	2002	
"Fallen"	Mya	Richard Shelton; Kevin Veney; Loren Hill; Leonard Huggins; Luiz Bonfá; Maria Toledo	Moodring	2003	
"Fear of Flying"	Mya	D. Thompson; Jerome Foster; Jimmy Davis; Teron Beal	Fear of Flying	2000	
"Fear of Flying (Interlude)"	Mya	Mya Harrison	Fear of Flying	2000	
"Focused on You"	Eric Bellinger featuring Mya & 2 Chainz	—N/a	Cuffing Season	2015	
"For the First Time"	Mya	Mya Harrison; Darryl Pearson	Fear of Flying	2000	
"Forever in Our Hearts"	Music for Relief	—N/a	non-album release	2005	
"Forever My Love"	Mya	Mya Harrison; Lamar Edwards; Shaunise Harris; Khirye Tyler	—N/a	2021	
"Forever with You"	Guy Sebastian featuring Mya	Guy Sebastian	Beautiful Life	2004	
"Free"	Mya	A. Richbourg; Jimmy Jam; Mya Harrison; Terry Lewis; Tony Tolbert	Fear of Flying	2000	
"Free Fallin'"	Mya	Jeff Lynne; Tom Petty	Moodring	2003	
"Fugitive Love"	Mya	Mya Harrison; Carmael M. Frith	K.I.S.S.	2011	
"G.M.O. (Got My Own)"	Mya featuring Tink	Mya Harrison; Lamar Edwards; Trinity Home	non-album release	2018	
"Get Over (Outro)"	Mya	Mya Harrison	Fear of Flying	2000	
"Ghetto Supastar"	Pras featuring Mya & Ol' Dirty Bastard	Barry Gibb; Maurice Gibb; Robin Gibb; Wyclef Jean; Russell Jones; Pras Michael	Bulworth	1998	
"Girls Dem Sugar"	Beenie Man featuring Mya	Moses Davis; Chad Hugo; Pharrell Williams	Art and Life	2000	
"Girls Like That"	Mya	Mya Harrison; Teron Beal; Kasseem Dean; Cynthia Loving	Fear of Flying	2000	
"Give a Chick a Hand"	Mya	Mya Harrison; Paula Pete	Liberation	2003	
"Go Hard or Go Home"	Mya	Mya Harrison; Teron Beal	Beauty & the Streets Vol. 1	2009	
"Grandma Says (Skit)"	Mya featuring Chris Thomas & Nonchalant	Mya Harrison	Fear of Flying	2000	
"Handsfree"	Ding Dong featuring Mya	—N/a	Sexting Riddim	2019	
"Hold n' Back"	Marques Houston featuring Mya & Shawnna	Marques Houston; Andre Merritt; Cory Peterson; Rashawnna Guy	Veteran	2007	
"Hold On"	Mya featuring Phil Adé	Mya Harrison; Kalenna Harper; Phil Adé	Smoove Jones	2016	
"House Party"	Mya	Trevor Wesley; Cliff Lewis; Mya Harrison	With Love	2014	
"How You Gonna Tell Me"	Mya	Mya Harrison; Kevin "She'kspere" Briggs; Kandi Burruss	Fear of Flying	2000	
"Hurry Up"	Mya featuring Gunz	Kenneth Ifill; Mya Harrison; Derek Cooper; Ernesto Shaw	Moodring	2003	
"I Am"	Mya featuring Charlie Baltimore	Mya Harrison; Kwamé Holland; Alan Gibb; Leroy Randolph; Charisse Rose	Liberation	2007	
"I Deserve It"	Mya	Mya Harrison; Lamar Edwards; Sydnii Raymore	—N/a	2020	
"I Got You"	Ky-Mani Marley featuring Mya	—N/a	Radio	2007	
"I Will Give It All to You"	Vlad Topalov featuring Mya	—N/a	Odinokaya Zvezda	2007	
"I'm Back"	Slim Thug featuring Mya	Mya Harrison; Christopher Moore; Stayve Thomas	Beauty & the Streets Vol. 1	2009	
"I'ma Do It"	Mya	Mya Harrison; Michael Cox, Jr. Lamar Edwards; John Groover; Rebecca Johnson	—N/a	2020	
"If I Ever (Remix)"	Wayne Wonder featuring Mya	—N/a	non-album release	2011	
"If Tomorrow Never Comes"	Mya	Mya Harrison; Lindsey "Mavelle" Gilbert	TKO (The Knock Out)	2018	
"If You Died I Wouldn't Cry Cause You Never Loved Me Anyway"	Mya	James "Woody" Green; R. Brown; Tamir Ruffin	Mya	1998	
"If You Were Mine"	Mya	Alex Cantrall; Myron Davis	Mya	1998	
"It's All About Me"	Mya featuring Sisqó	Darryl Pearson; Mark Andrews	Mya	1998	
"It's My Birthday"	Mya	Mya Harrison	K.I.S.S. (Deluxe Edition)	2012	
"J.O.B."	Foxy Brown featuring Mya	Sean Carter; Inga Marchand	Chyna Doll	1999	
"Just Call My Name"	Mya	Mya Harrison; Lamar Edwards; Gabrielle Nowee	—N/a	2020	
"K.I.S.S."	Mya	Mya Harrison; Edwin Serrano; Autumn Rowe; Christopher Moore	K.I.S.S.	2011	
"Keep On Lovin' Me"	Mya	Alex Cantrall; Darryl Pearson; Mark Andrews; Larry "Jazz" Anthony; N. Neka	Mya	1998	
"Knock You Out"	Mya	Mya Harrison; Marsha Ambrosius	TKO (The Knock Out)	2018	
"Lady Marmalade"	Christina Aguilera, Lil' Kim, Mya & Pink	Bob Crewe; Kenny Nolan	Moulin Rouge!	2001	
"Late"	Mya	Mya Harrison; Jimmy Jam; Terry Lewis; Bobby Ross Avila; Issiah J. Avila; Eddie Cole	Moodring	2003	
"Leave That Boy Alone"	Shortee Redd featuring Mya	—N/a	From da Bottom Up	2005	
"Let's Dance"	Mya	—N/a	Shall We Dance?	2004	
"Let's Go to War"	Mya featuring Faith Boogie	Mya Harrison; Christopher Moore; Faith Waldron	Sugar & Spice	2008	
"Liberation (Intro)"	Mya	Mya Harrison	Liberation	2007	
"Lie Detector"	Mya featuring Beenie Man	Mya Harrison; Jimmy Cozier; Wyclef Jean; Moses Davis	Fear of Flying	2000	
"Like a Woman"	Mya	Antione Hart; Mya Harrison	With Love	2014	
"Life's Too Short"	Mya	Mya Harrison; Bryan Michael Cox; Kendrick Dean	Liberation	2007	
"Lights Go Off"	Mya	Mya Harrison; Kristal "Tytewriter" Oliver; Ivan Barias; Carvin Haggins; Ezekiel Lewis; Thabiso Nkhereanye	Liberation	2007	
"Little Too Much, Little Too Late"	Mya	Diane Warren	Moodring	2003	
"Lock U Down"	Mya featuring Lil Wayne	Mya Harrison; Scott Storch; Dwayne Carter; Jason Boyd	Liberation	2007	
"Love Comes Love Goes"	Mya	Julian Brazier	K.I.S.S.	2011	
"Love Elevation Suite (Intro)"	Mya	Mya Harrison; Damar Aaron Beckett; Terence Lavar Odige; Jaymee Marie Rodriguez	Love Elevation Suite	2015	
"Love Is the Answer"	Cedric Gervais featuring Mya	Mya Harrison; Dee Roberts; Sandy Vee	Miamication	2011	
"Love Letters"	Shyheim featuring Mya	—N/a	Disrespectfully Speaking	2009	
"Love Me Some You"	Mya	Atozzio Towns	K.I.S.S. (Deluxe Edition)	2012	
"Love Me Some You"	Mya featuring Marques Houston	Atozzio Towns; Marqaues Houston	K.I.S.S.	2011	
"Love Somebody"	Yūji Oda featuring Mya	—N/a	11 Colors	2003	
"M-O-N-E-Y"	Mya	Mya Harrison; Zekuumba “BG” Zekkariyas; Desmond “BigheadDez” Peterson	Sweet XVI	2014	
"Man in My Life"	Mya	Rod Temperton	Fear of Flying	2000	
"Manaholic"	Mya	Mya Harrison; T. Ramsey; Teron Beal	Beauty & the Streets Vol. 1	2009	
"Mess Up My Hair"	Mya	Mya Harrison; Lindsay "Lindz" Fields; Nia Myricks	K.I.S.S.	2011	
"Mess Up My Hair"	Mya featuring Beenie Man	Mya Harrison; Lindsay "Lindz" Fields; Nia Myricks; Moses Davis	K.I.S.S. (Deluxe Edition)	2012	
"Money Can't Buy My Love"	Mya	Mya Harrison; Christopher Moore	Sugar & Spice	2008	
"Moodring"	Mya	Mya Harrison; Damon Elliott; Melissa Wright	Moodring	2003	
"Movin' On"	Mya featuring Silkk the Shocker	Mya Harrison; Darryl Pearson; Mark Andrews	Mya	1998	
"Movin' Out"	Mya featuring Noreaga & Raekwon	—N/a	Belly	1998	
"Mr. Incredible"	Mya featuring Marques Houston	Lindsay "Lindz" Fields; Nia Myricks; Mya Harrison	K.I.S.S.	2011	
"Must Be the Music"	Mya	Mya Harrison; Christopher Moore	Sugar & Spice	2008	
"My Bra"	Mya	Kara DioGuardi; James Poyser	non-album release	2007	
"My First Night with You"	Mya	Kenneth Edmonds; Diane Warren	Mya	1998	
"My Love Is Like...Wo"	Mya	Charles Bereal; Kenneth Bereal; Missy Elliott	Moodring	2003	
"No Matter What They Say"	Penelope Jones featuring Mya	—N/a	non-album release	2006	
"No Sleep Tonight"	Mya	Mark Sparks; Christopher Stewart; Rudy Currence	Moodring	2003	
"No Tears On My Pillow"	Mya	Mya Harrison; Robin Thicke	Fear of Flying	2000	
"No Touchin'"	Mya	Mya Harrison; Noel Fisher	Liberation	2007	
"Not Gonna Drop"	Mya	—N/a	Fat Albert	2005	
"Nothin' at All"	Mya	Mya Harrison; Christopher Stewart	Liberation	2007	
"Now or Lata"	Blo Pop featuring Mya	Mya Harrison; Christopher Moore; Teron Beal	Beauty & the Streets Vol. 1	2009	
"Now or Never"	Mya	Mya Harrison; B.B. Keyes; James Gass; Robert Daniels; Robin Thicke	Fear of Flying	2000	
"On One"	Mya	Mya Harrison; Marlon Coles	Love Elevation Suite	2015	
"One for You"	Mya	Mya Harrison; Christopher Moore	Sugar & Spice	2008	
"One Man Woman (Ol' Skoo' Joint)"	Mya	Mya Harrison; Cliff Lewis; Lisa Dogonyaro	Smoove Jones	2016	
"Open"	Mya featuring GoldLink	Mya Harrison; DeAnthony Carlos; Billy Wes	TKO (The Knock Out)	2018	
"Paradise"	Mya	Mya Harrison; Christopher Moore	Sugar & Spice	2008	
"Patience"	Mya	Mya Harrison	Love Elevation Suite	2015	
"Phya"	Mya	Mya Harrison; James "J-Doe" Smith	Smoove Jones	2016	
"Ponytail"	Mya featuring Nicki Minaj	Mya Harrison; Teron Beal; Onika Maraj	Beauty & the Streets Vol. 1	2009	
"Problem + Solution"	Mya	Tiwa Savage; Shawn Stockman	K.I.S.S.	2011	
"Pussycats"	Mya	Mya Harrison; Jerry Duplessis; Jimmy Cozier; Wyclef Jean	Fear of Flying	2000	
"Ready (Part III - 90's Bedroom Mix)"	Mya	Mya Harrison; Shaunise "Niecy" Harris; Sydnii Raymore; Robert Kelly	TKO (The Knock Out)	2018	
"Ready 4 Whatever 2.0"	Mya	Mya Harrison; Kevin McCall; Lamar "MyGuyMars" Edwards	TKO (The Knock Out)	2018	
"Real Compared to What"	Mya featuring Common	Eugene McDaniels	Moodring	2003	
"Rear View Mirror"	Mya featuring Sean Paul	Mya Harrison; Sean Paul Henriques	K.I.S.S.	2011	
"Ride & Shake"	Mya	Anthony Dent; Tamara Savage	Fear of Flying	2000	
"Ridin'"	Mya	Esther Dean; Traci Hale; Mya Harrison; Jevon Sims; Christopher Stewart	Liberation	2007	
"Right Now"	Mya	Shaunice “Sha Sha” Jones	Sweet XVI	2014	
"Roll Call"	GoldLink featuring Mya	D'Anthony Carlos; Ben-Abdallah; Fred David Jenkins; Jamar Aaron Beckett; Mya Harrison	At What Cost	2017	
"Runnin' Back"	Mya featuring Iyaz	Kyle Schrom; Iyobasa "Enpho" Ighedosa; Caleb Middlebrooks	K.I.S.S.	2011	
"Same Page"	Mya featuring Eric Bellinger	Eric Bellinger; Mya Harrison; Aaron JacQuar Smith	Sweet XVI	2014	
"Searchin' for Love"	Lil Eddie featuring Mya	—N/a	City of My Heart	2008	
"Sex Machine"	Mya	James Brown; Bobby Byrd; Ron Lenhoff	Legally Blonde	2001	
"Sexy"	Ray J featuring Mya	—N/a	Raydiation	2005	
"Show Me Somethin'"	Bun B featuring Mya	Mya Harrison; A. Harrison; Teron Beal; T. Ramsey; B. Freeman	Beauty & the Streets Vol. 1	2009	
"Shy Guy"	Mya	Mya Harrison; Kingsley Gardner; Diana King; Andy Marvel	Sugar & Spice	2008	
"Simple Things"	Mya	Mya Harrison; Shaunise "Niecy" Harris	TKO (The Knock Out)	2018	
"Smoove Jones Afta Glow Show (Outro)"	Mya	Mya Harrison; Terry Lewis; Christopher "C-Mo" Moore; Teron Beal	Smoove Jones	2016	
"Smoove Jones Radio (Intro)"	Mya	Mya Harrison	Smoove Jones	2016	
"Sold On Your Love"	Mya	Mya Harrison; Christopher Moore	Sugar & Spice	2008	
"Somebody Come Get This Bitch"	Mya	Mya Harrison; Stacie & Lacie	K.I.S.S. (Deluxe Edition)	2012	
"Somebody Like Me"	Silkk the Shocker featuring Mya	Mya Harrison; Vyshonn Miller	Made Man	1999	
"Sophisticated Lady"	Mya	Mya Harrison; Rudy Currence; James Johnson	Moodring	2003	
"Sorry"	Mya	Krystle Oliver	K.I.S.S.	2011	
"Space"	Mya	Latisha Hyman; Cliff Lewis; Mya Harrison	With Love	2014	
"Space and Time"	Mya	Mya Harrison; Charles Harmon; Claude Kelly	—N/a	2020	
"Spoil Me"	Mya	Mya Harrison; Cliff Lewis; Shaunice "Sha Sha" Jones	Smoove Jones	2016	
"Step"	Mya	Mya Harrison; Missy Elliott; Timothy Mosley	Moodring	2003	
"Still a Woman"	Mya	Mya Harrison; Scott Storch	Liberation	2007	
"Sugar Daddy"	Cuban Link featuring Mya	Felix Delgado	Chain Reaction	2005	
"Superwoman"	Mya	Melissa Dogonyaro; Mya Harrison; Cliff Lewis	Sweet XVI	2014	
"Switch It Up"	Mya	Mya Harrison; Ivan Barias; Carvin Haggins	Liberation	2007	
"Take a Picture"	Mya	Damon Elliott; Alecia Moore	Moodring	2003	
"Take Him Out"	Mya featuring Spice	Mya Harrison; Spice; Michael Boog; Junior Sanchez	K.I.S.S. (Deluxe Edition)	2012	
"Take Me There"	Blackstreet & Mya featuring Mase & Blinky Blink	Mason Betha; Michael Foster; Madeline Nelson; Teddy Riley; Tamara Savage	The Rugrats Movie	1998	
"Takin' Me Over"	Mya featuring Left Eye	Mya Harrison; James Gass; Lisa Lopes; Robert Daniels; Robin Thicke	Fear of Flying	2000	
"Taste This"	Mya	Mya Harrison; Sydney Brown; Kris Ricat; James Czeiner	Moodring	2003	
"Team You"	Mya	Mya Harrison; Fred "DJ" Jenkins; Damar Aaron Beckett	Smoove Jones	2016	
"Telephone Games"	Mya	Pamela Shipp	Fear of Flying	2000	
"T.K.O. Interlude"	Mya featuring A Guy Named Cliff	Mya Harrison	TKO (The Knock Out)	2018	
"That La La"	Elephant Man featuring Mya	—N/a	Let's Get Physical	2007	
"That's Why I Wanna Fight"	Mya	Fred Jerkins III; LaShawn Daniels; Rodney Jerkins	Fear of Flying	2000	
"The Best of Me"	Mya featuring Jadakiss	Mya Harrison; Jimmy Cozier; Kasseem Dean; Jason Phillips; Mashonda Tifrere; Teron Beal	Fear of Flying	2000	
"The Fall"	Mya	Mya Harrison	TKO (The Knock Out)	2018	
"The Only One"	Mya	Mya Harrison	Beauty & the Streets Vol. 1	2009	
"The Truth"	Mya	Mya Harrison; David Brown	Love Elevation Suite	2015	
"Thin Line"	Jurassic 5 featuring Mya	—N/a	Power in Numbers	2002	
"Things Come & Go"	Mya featuring Sean Paul	Mya Harrison; Sean Paul Henriques; Shuggie Otis	Moodring	2003	
"True Love"	Mya	Mya Harrison; Lamar Edwards; Byron Jamall Sims; William Wesson	—N/a	2021	
"Turn It Up (Intro)"	Mya	Mya Harrison	Fear of Flying	2000	
"Unbreakable"	Mya featuring Mike Check	Mya Harrison; Antione Hart; Michael J. Checklick II	Sweet XVI	2014	
"Usually"	Attitude featuring Mya	—N/a	non-album release	2008	
"Waiting for You"	Ron Browz featuring Mya	—N/a	Fly Away	2012	
"Walka Not a Talka"	Mya featuring Snoop Dogg	Mya Harrison; Lyrica Anderson; Evan Bogart; Calvin Broadus; J. R. Rotem	Liberation	2007	
"We Are the World 25 for Haiti"	Artists for Haiti	Michael Jackson; Lionel Richie	non-album release	2010	
"We Won't Stop"	Shortee Redd featuring Mya	—N/a	From da Bottom Up	2005	
"We're Gonna Make Ya Dance"	Mya	Mya Harrison; Darryl Pearson; Tamir Ruffin	Mya	1998	
"Welcome to My World"	Mya	Mya Harrison; Damar Beckett; Fred "DJ" Jenkins; Terence Odige	Smoove Jones	2016	
"What Cha Say"	Mya	Mya Harrison; Darryl Pearson	Mya	1998	
"What More Can I Give"	Various Artists	Michael Jackson	non-album release	2003	
"Whatever Bitch"	Mya	Mya Harrison; Damon Elliott	Moodring	2003	
"Where the Dream Takes You"	Mya	James Newton Howard; Diane Warren	Atlantis: The Lost Empire	2001	
"Whine"	Mya featuring Bounty Killer	Mya Harrison; Matthew Thompson; Mavelle Gilbert; Rodney Price; Theron Thomas	—N/a	2023	
"Why Should I Believe You"	Mya	—N/a	Life	1999	
"Why You Gotta Look So Good?"	Mya featuring Lloyd Banks	Christopher Lloyd; Dana Stinson; Teron Beal; Mya Harrison	Moodring	2003	
"With You"	Mya featuring My Guy Mars	Mya Harrison; Lamar "MyGuyMars" Edwards; Alexandria Dopson	TKO (The Knock Out)	2018	
"Without You"	Mya with Alyx Ander	Mya Harrison; Alex Bulter; Frederik Geuze; Karen Harding; Hayley May; Ifeoluwa Oladigbolu; Lee Williams	—N/a	2020	
"Wish You Were Here"	Mya featuring Che'Nelle	Mya Harrison; Christopher Moore	Sugar & Spice: The Perfect Edition	2009	
"Work It Out"	Mya	Mya Harrison; Christopher Moore; Teron Beal	Beauty & the Streets Vol. 1	2009	
"Worth It"	Mya	Mya Harrison; Lamar Edwards; Kevin Kesse; Cliff Lewis	—N/a	2021	
"X-Rated"	Mya with Beenie Man & Sekon Sta	—N/a	Yard Jam Riddim	2019	
"You"	Mya	Richard Shelton; Kevin Veney; Loren Hill; Marthea Jackson	Moodring	2003	
"You Got Me"	Mya	Mya Harrison; Sydnii Raymore	TKO (The Knock Out)	2018	
"You Got Me, Part II"	Mya	Mya Harrison; Roosevelt "Bink" Harrell	—N/a	2020	

== Unreleased songs ==
List of unreleased songs recorded by Mya
Song	Artist(s)	Composer(s)	Intended album	Ref.
"Backseat"	Mya	—N/a	—N/a	
"Bitch Like Me"	Mya featuring Eightball	—N/a	Liberation	
"Blame Myself"	Mya	—N/a	Control Freak	
"Bodyguard"	Mya	Ronald Ferebee	—N/a	
"Born a Star"	Mya featuring Jadakiss	Arkatech Beatz	Sugar & Spice	
"Bout It"	Mya featuring Yung Joc	—N/a	—N/a	
"Break Your Neck"	Mya	Carmael M. Frith	—N/a	
"Climb the Walls"	Mya	Collins Nwanery	Liberation	
"Come Home to Me"	Mya with Kreesha Turner	Mya Harrison; Chris Malloy Jr. Earl Stevens	—N/a	
"Confusion"	Mya	—N/a	—N/a	
"Dangerous Mind"	Mya	Mark J. Feist; Mya Harrison; Damon Sharpe	—N/a	
"Dash"	Mya	Stargate	—N/a	
"Don't Be Shy"	Mya	Mya Harrison	—N/a	
"Escape"	Mya	—N/a	Control Freak	
"Everytime"	Mya	Philip Lawrence; Shannon Lawrence; Mya Harrison; Mario Winans	—N/a	
"Franklins"	Mya	Kasseem Dean; Raymond Scott; Trevor Smith	—N/a	
"Full Service"	Mya	Mya Harrison; Joseph Howard; Christopher Moore; F. Thompson	—N/a	
"Get Our Our Way"	Mya	Albert Johnson; Kejuan Muchita	—N/a	
"Get Up"	Mya	Keyshia Cole; Mya Harrison; Damon Elliott	Moodring	
"Go On"	Mya	Mya Harrison; Ike Lee	—N/a	
"Hangover"	Mya	—N/a	—N/a	
"Here's My Number Babe"	Mya	Albert Johnson; Kejuan Muchita	—N/a	
"Heart Attack"	Mya	Mya Harrison; Brian Kidd	—N/a	
"Height of My Love"	Mya	—N/a	—N/a	
"Here's My Number Babe"	Mya	Mya Harrison; Brian Kidd; William Pettaway, Jr.	—N/a	
"How We Carry"	Mya	J.R. Rotem	Liberation	
"I Got That"	Mya featuring The Game	Mya Harrison; Scott Storch	Liberation	
"I Hate Being Broke"	Mya	Mya Harrison; Kandi Burruss; Kevin "She'kspere" Briggs	—N/a	
"I Just Don't Get It"	Mya featuring Yonni	Mya Harrison; Jereme Alerta; Joseph Domovitch; Ronald Ferebee Jr. Shaunice Jones	—N/a	
"I'll Still Be Around"	Mya	Wade Brown; Mya Harrison; David Jones; Johnny William Bristol	Liberation	
"It's Real"	Mya with Ginuwine	Ted Clinkscale; Melvin Rogers	—N/a	
"It Don't Matter"	Mya	Sean Garrett	Liberation	
"Just Be a Man About It"	Mya	Mark J. Feist; Mya Harrison; Damon Sharpe	—N/a	
"Kissin' You"	Rich Rick featuring Mya	—N/a	from Rags to Rich Rick	
"Lay With You"	Mya	Mya Harrison	Liberation	
"Let It Go"	Mya	—N/a	Liberation	
"Liberation"	Mya	—N/a	Liberation	
"Life Ain't Easy"	Lil Zo featuring Mya	—N/a	—N/a	
"Like Crazy"	Mya	The-Dream	Liberation	
"Live Your Life"	Mya featuring Cory Mo	Mya Harrison; Brian Kidd; William Pettaway, Jr.	—N/a	
"Lost"	Mya	Mya Harrison; Kenneth Karlin; Makeba Riddick; Carsten Schack	—N/a	
"Melody"	Mya with Cory Mo	Mya Harrison; Cory Moore	—N/a	
"Mercy"	Mya	Jason Boyd; Mya Harrison; Scott Storch	Liberation	
"Never Gonna Let You"	Mya	—N/a	—N/a	
"Never Left Me"	Mya	—N/a	—N/a	
"One Night"	Mya	Tim Kelley; Bob Robinson	—N/a	
"Only One"	Mya	Mya Harrison; Ronald Ferebee Jr.	—N/a	
"Opposite Attraction"	Gucci Mane featuring Mya	—N/a	Trap Night Round 1	
"Out with a Bang"	Mya	Teron Beal; Mya Harrison; Leroy Williams	—N/a	
"Pay Off"	Mya	—N/a	Liberation	
"Play Thang"	Mya	Christopher Stewart; Mya Harrison; Rodney Richard	—N/a	
"Qualified"	Mya	—N/a	Liberation	
"Right Hand High"	Mya	Teron Beal; Mya Harrison; Gavin Marchand; Ty Phife	—N/a	
"Secret Weapon"	James Jullian featuring Mya	—N/a	From My Integrated Soul	
"Serious"	Mya	—N/a	Liberation	
"Set Me Free"	Mya	—N/a	—N/a	
"Shake It like a Dog"	Mya featuring Jim Jones	—N/a	Liberation	
"Smilin'"	Mya	DeVante Swing; Dalvin DeGrate	Liberation	
"Split Personality"	Mya	Mya Harrison; Bryce Wilson	—N/a	
"T-Shirt and a Thong"	Mya	Mya Harrison; Christopher Moore; Leroy Williams	—N/a	
"Take It Back"	Mya	—N/a	—N/a	
"Take It Or Leave It"	Mya	Red Zone	—N/a	
"Tell Me Nothin'"	Mya	—N/a	Liberation	
"The Hills"	Mya	—N/a	—N/a	
"Tic Toc"	Mya	—N/a	—N/a	
"Unless My Period's Late"	Mya	—N/a	Moodring	
"Wanna Love Me Now"	Mya	Collins Nwanery	Liberation	
"What If"	Mya	Angelino Kratsas; Charles J. Salerno	—N/a	

== See also ==
- Mya discography
- Mya videography
- Mya filmography
- List of Mya live performances
