= Khirye Tyler =

American producer and songwriter

Khirye Anthony Tyler
- Born: Mansfield, Ohio, U.S.
- Occupations: Record producer; songwriter
- Spouse: Elizabeth Tyler
- Children: 5
- Musical career
- Genres: R&B; soul; hip-hop; pop
- Label: Black Suit Music
- Member of: Red Hands

Khirye Tyler is an American songwriter and record producer, best known for his various contributions to 2024 Beyoncé album Cowboy Carter and 2018 Meek Mill album Championships, as well as co-writing 2019 Roddy Ricch song "The Box" and 2020 Khalid song "Eleven". Tyler was also a co-music director of the Renaissance World Tour and music director of Beyoncé Bowl.

== Early life ==
Tyler grew up in foster care and started playing piano in church and taking lessons at age 9. He would eventually move to Columbus after graduating from high school, producing his first full-length album for a gospel artist when he was 18.

== Career ==
Tyler would first appear professionally as a music producer on Transparent, the 2014 debut album from Sunday Best runner-up contestant Jessica Reedy. In 2016, Tyler appeared in Damien Chazelle musical La La Land as the Jazz Club pianist of the main character Sebastian. He next began working closely with American production-instrumental team 1500 or Nothin', as well as producer The-Dream, contributing to projects from Alicia Keys, EarthGang, 6lack, Lucky Daye, Khalid, and Beyoncé, among others, as well as the film soundtrack for Dolemite Is My Name. In 2022, Tyler became the jury representative for Ohio on the music reality television series American Song Contest. After contributing to the 2023 Renaissance World Tour film end-credits song "My House", Tyler appeared on Beyonce's eighth studio album Cowboy Carter in various capacities across seven tracks, including standout "Ya Ya", Grammy Award for Best Melodic Rap Performance-nominee "Spaghettii", and covers of "Jolene" and "Blackbird" (stylized as "Blackbiird").

== Selected songwriting & production credits ==
Title	Year	Artist	Album
"Better"	2014	Jessica Reedy	Transparent
"Lovin' You for Life" (featuring Lil' Kim)	2017	The Notorious B.I.G. & Faith Evans	The King & I
"Like I Used To" (featuring Timbuktu)	2017	Snoh Aalegra	Feels
"Bouncin'"	2017	Nick Grant	Return of the Cool
"Ready for Whatever"	2018	Mya	T.K.O. (The Knock Out)
"Knock You Out"	2018	Mya	T.K.O. (The Knock Out)
"Like I Should"	2019	Craig Robinson	Dolemite Is My Name (soundtrack)
"Combo D"	2019	Eddie Murphy	Dolemite Is My Name (soundtrack)
"Raise A Man"	2019	Alicia Keys	Non-album single
"Truth Without Love"	2020	Alicia Keys	Alicia
"Eleven"	2020	Khalid	Non-album single
"Ghost of Soulja Slim"	2020	Jay Electronica	A Written Testimony
"Another Day Gone" (featuring Khalid)	2020	A Boogie wit da Hoodie	Artist 2.0
"Big Homie Rules"	2020	Yo Gotti	Untrapped
"The Box"	2020	Roddy Ricch	Please Excuse Me for Being Antisocial
"Rendezvous"	2020	Jack Harlow	Thats What They All Say
"21C / Delta"	2020	Jack Harlow	Thats What They All Say
"Martha Stewart"	2020	Yung Gravy	Gasanova
"Cupid" (with EarthGang and 6lack featuring Lucky Daye)	2020	Spillage Village	Spilligion
"Never Change" (featuring Future)	2021	Trippie Redd	Neon Shark vs Pegasus
"I Got You" (with Busta Rhymes)	2021	Trippie Redd	Neon Shark vs Pegasus
"Retrograde" (featuring 6lack & Lucky Daye)	2021	Khalid	Scenic Drive
"Open" (featuring Majid Jordan)	2021	Khalid	Scenic Drive
"Long Voyage Home"	2022	The Isley Brothers	Make Me Say It Again, Girl
"Lost"	2022	Adam Blackstone	Legacy
"My House"	2023	Beyoncé	Renaissance: A Film by Beyoncé
"Ameriican Requiem"	2024	Beyoncé	Cowboy Carter
"Blackbiird" (with Brittney Spencer, Reyna Roberts, Tanner Adell & Tiera Kennedy)	2024	Beyoncé	Cowboy Carter
"Jolene"	2024	Beyoncé	Cowboy Carter
"Spaghettii" (with Linda Martell & Shaboozey)	2024	Beyoncé	Cowboy Carter
"Alliigator Tears"	2024	Beyoncé	Cowboy Carter
"Ya Ya"	2024	Beyoncé	Cowboy Carter
"Tyrant" (with Dolly Parton)	2024	Beyoncé	Cowboy Carter

== Filmography ==
Year	Title	Role	Ref
2016	La La Land	Seb's Pianist	
2023	Renaissance: A Film by Beyoncé	Silver Horse Band - Keyboardist	

== Awards and nominations ==
Year	Ceremony	Award	Result	Ref
2021	63rd Annual Grammy Awards	Grammy Award for Song of the Year ("The Box")	Nominated	
2021	63rd Annual Grammy Awards	Grammy Award for Best Rap Song ("The Box")	Nominated	
