= Knock You Out =

Single by Mya

from the album T.K.O. (The Knock Out)
- Released: April 13, 2018
- Genre: Alternative R&B
- Length: 3:51
- Label: Planet 9; MGM
- Songwriter(s): Mya Harrison; Marsha Ambrosius
- Producer(s): MyGuyMars

Mya singles chronology
| "Damage" (2018) | "Knock You Out" (2018) | "G.M.O. (Got My Own)" (2018) |

"Knock You Out" is a song recorded by American singer Mya. A collaborative effort, it was written and conceptualized by Mýa and Marsha Ambrosius utilizing boxing references as metaphors throughout the entire song, while production duties was handled by frequent collaborator Lamar "MyGuyMars" Edwards. Musically, a spacey neo soul song, "Knock You Out" is described as an Isley Brothers-indebted bedroom jam with guitar licks and spaced-out vocal harmonies. Released April 13, 2018, "Knock You Out" served as the fifth single from T.K.O. (The Knock Out) (2018).

== Background ==
As tradition, on February 14, 2016, Mýa released her seventh studio album Smoove Jones (2016) to commemorate the release of her debut single "It's All About Me" and eighteenth anniversary in the entertainment industry. The release paid homage to R&B/soul/hip-hop with old school elements from the 1970s, 1980s, and 1990s and was released exclusively through Apple Music. Critically, Smoove Jones received "generally favourable" reviews from music critics. In 2017, Smoove Jones received a nomination for Best R&B Album at the 59th Annual Grammy Awards, which were held on February 12, 2017. Two days later, as a gift to her fans and commemorating her nineteenth anniversary, Mýa released a music video for the fan favorite "Coolin'." Filmed in Sydney, Australia, director Matt Sharp captures the singer's unmistakable beauty while she lets her vocals do the rest on a sandy beach.

In late 2017, Mýa released the first single from the forthcoming studio album, Ready for Whatever on September 22, 2017. A music video for "Ready for Whatever" was produced and directed by Mýa co-starring R&B singer Kevin McCall as her love interest. Less than two months, its follow up single and sequel, Ready, Part II was released on November 24, 2017. The song paid homage to R.Kelly's It Seems Like You're Ready. A third single, "You Got Me" was released on February 14, 2018, to commemorate the twentieth anniversary of her debut single "It's All About Me."

== Composition ==
A "spacey neo soul" song, "Knock You Out" was written by Harrison and Marsha Ambrosius with production helmed by frequent collaborator MyGuyMars. Inspired by the vocal work of The Isley Brothers, "Knock You Out" is described as an indebted bedroom jam with guitar licks and spaced-out vocal harmonies. "Knock You Out" is performed in the key of A Minor and set at a moderate beat at 70 beats per minute in common time.

== Personnel ==
Credits adapted from Qobuz.

- Mýa – vocals, songwriting
- Marsha Ambrosius – songwriting
- Lamar "Mars" Edwards – composer

== Release history ==
| Region | Date | Format | Label | Ref. |
|---|---|---|---|---|
| Various | April 13, 2018 | Digital download; streaming | Planet 9; The Orchard | |
