= Damage (Mya song) =

Single by Mya

from the album T.K.O. (The Knock Out)
- Released: March 23, 2018
- Genre: R&B; soul
- Length: 4:43
- Label: Planet 9; MGM
- Songwriters: Mya Harrison; Lindsay "Mavelle" Gilbert
- Producers: Los Da Mystro; MyGuyMars

Mya singles chronology
"You Got Me" (2018)	"Damage" (2018)	"Knock You Out" (2018)

Music video
- "Damage" on YouTube

"Damage" is a song recorded by American singer Mya. Originally, the track was completed back in 2011, however was placed on hold due to "timing". Described as a "vulnerable" song, "Damage" was written and conceptualized by Lindsay "Mavelle" Gilbert and Mya, while production was helmed by Los Da Mystro with additional contribution from frequent collaborator Lamar "MyGuyMars" Edwards. Inspired by musicians Prince, The Isley Brothers and Mint Condition, "Damage" musically incorporates a combination of electric guitar, drums and keys. Released March 23, 2018, Damage served as the fourth single from Harrison's eighth studio album T.K.O. (The Knock Out) (2018). A music video directed, produced, and choreographed by renowned choreographer Galen Hooks premiered via Complex and MTV's Total Request Live in July 2018.

== Background ==
As tradition, on February 14, 2016, Mýa released her seventh studio album Smoove Jones (2016) to commemorate the release of her debut single "It's All About Me" and eighteenth anniversary in the entertainment industry. The release paid homage to R&B/soul/hip-hop with old school elements from the 1970s, 1980s, and 1990s and was released exclusively through Apple Music. Critically, Smoove Jones received "generally favourable" reviews from music critics. In 2017, Smoove Jones received a nomination for Best R&B Album at the 59th Annual Grammy Awards, which were held on February 12, 2017. Two days later, as a gift to her fans and commemorating her nineteenth anniversary, Mýa released a music video for the fan favorite "Coolin'". Filmed in Sydney, director Matt Sharp captures the singer's unmistakable beauty while she lets her vocals do the rest on a sandy beach.

In late 2017, Mýa released the first single from the forthcoming studio album, Ready for Whatever on September 22, 2017. A music video for "Ready for Whatever" was produced and directed by Mýa co-starring R&B singer Kevin McCall as her love interest. Less than two months, its follow up single and sequel, Ready, Part II was released on November 24, 2017. The song paid homage to R.Kelly's It Seems Like You're Ready. A third single, "You Got Me" was released on February 14, 2018 to commemorate the twentieth anniversary of her debut single "It's All About Me."

== Recording and release ==
Initially, "Damage" was written, produced and recorded back in 2011. A collaborative effort, "Damage" is a four-minute and 43-second contemporary R&B midtempo written by singer-songwriter Lindsey "Mavelle" Gilbert, Torauss Johnson and Mýa, with production overseen by producers Los Da Mystro and My Guy Mars. Pulling from the inspiration of 70's and 90's R&B, "Damage" starts with a couple of very soft inflections in reminiscent of The Isley Brothers, but gradually build vocally like Stokley of R&B band Mint Condition and combines the guitar dynamics of Prince.

To prep for its release, Mýa had announced and previewed "Damage" her Instagram account. Beginning March 16, 2018 fans had the option to pre-order "Damage." Her new single, "Damage" was officially released on March 23, 2018.

== Music video ==
=== Background ===
The music video for "Damage" premiered televised on MTV's TRL and digitally online via Complex. Speaking with Complex, Mýa revealed the message behind the song, commenting, "'Damage' is about taking risks, stepping into new territory regardless of the outcome, while further explaining, this thing we call love has always been tricky and as beautiful as it can be, we can potentially lose ourselves in it. With the good often comes the bad. That's life and it's scary, noting lastly, that with an intense passion and yearning, I'm willing to risk it all for that special one who sets my soul and desire on fire, despite the potential damage it may bring."

=== Synopsis ===
"Damage" is described as an eye catching video which was directed, produced, choreographed, edited, and styled by Galen Hooks—a choreographer known for her work with artists like Rihanna, Usher, Britney Spears, and Justin Bieber. Against minimalist industrial backdrops, Hooks' powerful choreography plays up the defiant nature of the song as Mýa delivers a dynamic performance."

== Personnel ==
Credits adapted from Qobuz.

- Mýa – vocals, songwriting
- Mavelle – songwriting
- Los Da Mystro – composer
- Lamar "Mars" Edwards – composer

== Release history ==
Region	Date	Format	Label	Ref.
Various	March 23, 2018	Digital download; streaming	Planet 9; The Orchard	
