= Eleven (Khalid song) =

Single by Khalid
- Released: January 11, 2020
- Length: 3:26
- Label: RCA
- Songwriter(s): Khalid Robinson; Denis Kosiak; Jamil "Digi" Chammas; Kaelyn Behr; Khirye Tyler; Simon Rosen
- Producer(s): Jamil "Digi" Chammas; Simon Says

Khalid singles chronology
"Up All Night" (2019)	"Eleven" (2020)	"Know Your Worth" (2020)

"Eleven" is a song by American singer Khalid, released on January 11, 2020, from RCA Records. Its remix features American R&B singer Summer Walker, who co-wrote the song alongside Jamil "Digi" Chammas and Simon Says, who also produced the track.

== Charts ==
Chart performance for "Eleven"
Chart (2020)	Peak position
Australia (ARIA)	48
Canada (Canadian Hot 100)	52
Ireland (IRMA)	53
New Zealand Hot Singles (RMNZ)	7
Portugal (AFP)	112
Sweden (Sverigetopplistan)	71
Switzerland (Schweizer Hitparade)	74
UK Singles (OCC)	70
US Billboard Hot 100	83
US Hot R&B/Hip-Hop Songs (Billboard)	39

== Certifications ==
Certifications for "Eleven"
Region	Certification	Certified units/sales
Australia (ARIA)	Gold	35,000^{‡}
Brazil (Pro-Música Brasil)	Gold	20,000^{‡}
New Zealand (RMNZ)	Platinum	30,000^{‡}
^{‡} Sales+streaming figures based on certification alone.
