= T.K.O. (The Knock Out) =

Studio album by Mya
- Released: April 20, 2018
- Recorded: 2015–2016
- Studios: Spaceship Studio; Planet 9 Studio; Top 40 Studio
- Genre: R&B
- Length: 40:38
- Labels: Planet 9; MGM; the Orchard
- Producers: Mya Harrison; Lamar "MyGuyMars" Edwards; Khirye Tyler; R.Kelly; Los Da Mystro; Lyle LeDuff; Philip "HardWork" Constable

Mya chronology
Smoove Jones (2016)	T.K.O. (The Knock Out) (2018)	Retrospect (2026)

Singles from T.K.O. (The Knock Out)
- 1. "Ready for Whatever" Released: September 22, 2017; 2. "You Got Me" Released: February 14, 2018; 3. "Damage" Released: March 23, 2018; 4. "Knock You Out" Released: April 13, 2018; 5. "Open" Released: May 13, 2019

T.K.O. (The Knock Out) is the eighth studio album by American singer-songwriter Mya. It was released April 20, 2018, on her label Planet 9, in commemoration of the twentieth anniversary of her self-titled debut album, Mya (1998). A follow-up to Smoove Jones (2016), T.K.O. was recorded between 2015 and 2016. The album features primary production by Lamar "MyGuyMars" Edwards, with additional production from Los Da Mystro, Lyle LeDuff, Hardwerk and Khirye Tyler.

Sonically, T.K.O. is a contemporary R&B album fusing elements of 1970s and 1990s R&B with a more modern, contemporary sound, marking a departure from the traditional R&B style of Smoove Jones. It received generally positive reviews, with critics praising it as a strong and polished R&B album that highlights Mya's artistry, blends contemporary and classic influences. Commercially, T.K.O. opened and peaked at number 41 on the US Independent Albums chart, where it remained for one week.

Planet 9 released five singles in the lead-up to and following the album's release: "Ready for Whatever", "You Got Me", "Damage", "Knock You Out", and "Open," although none of them achieved chart success. To further promote the album, Mya embarked on the T.K.O. Tour, her fourth concert tour, which ran from June to September 2018 and included 25 performances, featuring several selected international dates.

== Development ==
Well, I had to learn patience. I definitely learned that when I want something done, I'm very tunnel-visioned out. I don't come out of the house. I beat myself up. I don't eat. I don't sleep until it's done, especially if I have a deadline in mind. It's the 20th anniversary this year, so I had to be patient. It didn't come out when I wanted it to, but I just said, "OK. We have another anniversary this year on April 20."

— Mya on the creation and timing of T.K.O. (The Knock Out) with Billboard.

T.K.O. (The Knock Out) was recorded between 2015 and 2016 after the release of Smoove Jones (2016). Like with all her independent projects, Harrison served as executive producer for T.K.O. (The Knock Out) as well, which entailed her scouting for producers, songwriters, arranging the album's track listing, and keeping track of the accounting. With T.K.O. though, Harrison decided to form a partnership with musician and producer Lamar "MyGuyMars" Edwards. Edwards had contributed production on her last studio effort, Smoove Jones, which catered more towards traditional R&B. The creation process for T.K.O. started when Harrison continued to work with Edwards and formed a musical partnership. Speaking with Billboard, Harrison acknowledged the process to the project was "easy." However, before dabbling into the contemporary R&B space for her next independent project, Harrison made the conscious decision to release Smoove Jones first to satisfy longtime fans that connected with that particular sound, which is more eclectic, classic and old school. Musically with T.K.O., since contemporary R&B is more current sonically, Harrison and Edwards just essentially incorporated and fused it with 90's R&B, SWV, Aaliyah, R.Kelly, Mint Condition along with Prince, Teddy Pendergrass and The Isley Brothers influences from the 70s. Using material she recorded back in 2011, 2015, and 2016 from her archive, Harrison commented it was all about "building" and "tweaking" songs. Commenting on the results, Harrison said, "It was all about creating a nice experience for R&B fans, R&B lovers, and have it apply to today's sound of music, sonically, and that's what we did." As executive producer, Harrison was held responsible for drafting all of her contracts, handling publishing split sheets, and generating her own revenue for/funding each component of a project and to avoid early leakage of the project or any of her music, Harrison drafts and services a pre- and post-recording agreement to hold the producers, writers, artists, and engineers liable for leakage, sharing, placement, and playing of her music.

== Composition ==
=== Music and songs ===
Described as Smoove Jones part two, T.K.O. serves as continuation on Harrison's last studio effort except with Smoove Jones, she blended R&B/soul/hip-hop genre with elements of the 1970s, 1980s, and 1990s and geared towards traditional R&B, while T.K.O. is current contemporary R&B with a hint of '90s R&B and influences from the '70s. In terms of sounds, Mya revealed early on that the album is very heavily leaning on R&B slow jams. T.K.O. (The Knock Out) starts with "Open" featuring DMV rapper GoldLink and is described as a slice of atmospheric trap-flavored R&B. The pulsating, "Down" serves as the album's fourth track. Track five, "Ready For Whatever 2.0" is a reimagining of the album's first single and is an homage to Aaliyah's effortless cool. Inspired by Mint Condition and Prince, "Damage" was recorded back in 2011 and serves as the album's sixth track. Track eight, "You Got Me" is a millennial slow jam that blends combination of steady drums and synths reminiscent of the 90's R&B. The spacey, "Knock You Out" is an Isley Brothers-indebted bedroom jam with guitar licks and spaced-out vocal harmonies and serves as the album's tenth track. The album's final track, the '80s/'90s big ballad "If Tomorrow Never Comes" was originally recorded back in 2011 and inspired by the vocal work of R&B group Jodeci.

== Artwork ==
For the album's packaging, Mya traveled to Nassau, Bahamas and completed a photoshoot for her single and album covers. On the album cover, Mya is dressed in black lingerie with a black robe draping her body, while directing a smoldering stare into the camera.

== Release and promotion ==
Initially, T.K.O. (The Knock Out) was scheduled for a Valentine's Day release to commemorate the twentieth anniversary of her debut single, "It's All About Me," however the project was unable to make its deadline and pushed back. In an interview with Hot 97, Mya confirmed T.K.O. was scheduled for an April 20, 2018 release to commemorate the twentieth anniversary of her debut album Mya (1998). Digitally, the release was distributed through indie distribution company, The Orchard. Her first release under Sony Music company. Through her official website store, physical copies was made available for purchase exclusively in standard, autographed or personalized editions. In honor of her twentieth anniversary and to celebrate T.K.O.'s album release Mya performed at the House of Blues in New York City on April 27, 2018. She held a private album listening session at UnplugdLA's The Study in Los Angeles, California.

=== Singles ===
In September 2017, Mya began releasing a series of singles in support of the album. Mya released the first single from T.K.O.(The Knock Out), "Ready for Whatever" on September 22, 2017. A music video for "Ready for Whatever" was produced and directed by Mya co-starring R&B singer Kevin McCall as her love interest. Less than two months, a remix version, "Ready, Part II" was released on November 24, 2017. The song paid homage to R. Kelly's "It Seems Like You're Ready". A second single, "You Got Me", was released on February 14, 2018, to commemorate the twentieth anniversary of her debut single "It's All About Me". "Damage", the third single from T.K.O. was released on March 23, 2018. Less than a month, a week before the album's release, "Knock You Out" was released as an instant grat download when fans pre-ordered T.K.O. (The Knock Out) alongside previous singles "You Got Me" and "Damage." In 2019, as tradition in honor her debut single, Harrison gifted her fans with a new music video to commemorate the anniversary. "With You" was released as a promotional single on February 14, 2019. Approximately two months later, in honor of the one year anniversary of her thirteenth studio project, TKO (The Knock Out), Harrison gifted her fans with the music video for "Down" on April 20, 2019.

== Critical reception ==
Professional ratings
Review scores
Source	Rating
Soul in Stereo	3.5/5 stars

T.K.O. (The Knock Out) earned generally positive reviews from music critics. Michael Love from Paper magazine described the album as "impressive in its scope," noting that it references Mya's "inspirations spanning the genre's masters" while remaining both "old school" and "forward-thinking." He concluded that although Mya is "a well-studied product of her influences," she is "an artist all her own," producing, writing, and owning her work independently. Cherise Johnson, writing for HipHopDX, found that T.K.O. (The Knock Out) was "everything you'd expect from a woman who first came onto the scene in 1998. No song on T.K.O. deserves to be skipped, especially the emotional "Ready 4 Whatever 2.0" and empathetic "Damage."

Jon Powell, writing for Revolt, noted that the project kept Mya rooted in contemporary R&B while nodding to the decades that influenced her sound, and highlighted a strong run of singles. He also pointed out the DMV connection on the opening track "Open," ultimately concluding that the album showcased "veteran Mya, still active, still steering the ship." In his review of T.K.O. (The Knock Out), Edward Bowser from Soul in Stereo described the album as "grown n’ sexy R&B, plain and simple, delivered with the poise of an industry vet." He found that tracks like "The Fall" featured "bass-heavy production and an atmospheric aura," and praised "Damage" as "the real gem." Although Bowser felt the album was not "bulletproof," noting that at times "simplicity is its shortcoming," he ultimately deemed it "another quietly solid release."

=== Accolades ===
Year-end lists for T.K.O. (The Knock Out)
Publication	Accolade	Rank	Ref.
HipHopDX	Top R&B Albums of 2018	8	

== Commercial performance ==
T.K.O. (The Knock Out) debuted and peaked at number forty-one on the Independent Albums chart, marking Mya's second entry on the chart after Smoove Jones (2016). The album remained on the chart for a single week.

== Track listing ==
T.K.O. (The Knock Out) track listing
No.	Title	Writer(s)	Producer(s)	Length
1.	"The Fall"	Mya Harrison	Lamar "MyGuyMars" Edwards; Lyle LeDuff; Mya Harrison^{[c]}	2:34
2.	"Open" (featuring GoldLink)	Harrison; Billy Wes; DeAnthony Carlos	Edwards; Harrison^{[c]}	3:27
3.	"Simple Things"	Harrison; Shaunise "Niecy Nice" Harris	Edwards^{[c]}; Harrison^{[c]}	3:41
4.	"Down"	Harrison; Harris; Sydnii "KydSyd" Raymore	Edwards; Harrison^{[c]}	2:46
5.	"Ready 4 Whatever 2.0"	Harrison; Kevin McCall; Lamar "MyGuyMars" Edwards	Edwards^{[c]}; Khirye Tyler^{[b]}; Harrison^{[c]}	3:22
6.	"Damage"	Harrison; Lindsey "Mavelle" Gilbert	Los Da Mystro; Edwards^{[b]}; Lindsey "Mavelle" Gilbert^{[c]}; Harrison^{[c]}	4:43
7.	"Ready (Part III – 90's Bedroom Mix)"	Harrison; Harris; Raymore; Robert Kelly	Edwards; Tyler^{[b]}; Robert Kelly^{[b]}; Harrison^{[c]}	4:00
8.	"You Got Me"	Harrison; Raymore	Edwards^{[c]}; Harrison^{[c]}	3:23
9.	"T.K.O. Interlude" (featuring A Guy Named Cliff)	Harrison	Edwards; Harrison^{[c]}	0:50
10.	"Knock You Out"	Harrison; Marsha Ambrosius	Edwards; Tyler^{[b]}; Harrison^{[c]}	3:51
11.	"With You" (featuring My Guy Mars)	Harrison; Edwards; Alexandria Dopson	Edwards^{[c]}; Harrison^{[c]}	4:16
12.	"If Tomorrow Never Comes"	Harrison; Gilbert	Philip "DJ HardWerk" Constable; Gilbert^{[c]}; Harrison^{[c]}	3:45
Total length:				40:38

Vinyl bonus track
No.	Title	Length
13.	"Open" (solo mix)

Notes

- ^{^[a]} signifies a co-producer
- ^{^[b]} signifies an additional producer
- ^{^[c]} signifies a vocal producer

Sample credits

- "The Fall" contains a musical interpolation of "Saudade Vem Correndo" and a lyrical interpolation of "Fallen".
- "Open" contains an interpolation of "My Life" by Mary J. Blige.
- "Damage" contains an excerpt of "Breakin' My Heart (Pretty Brown Eyes)" by Mint Condition.
- "Ready (Part III – 90's Bedroom Mix)" contains an interpolation of "It Seems Like You're Ready" by R. Kelly.
- "T.K.O. Interlude" contains an interpolation of "Love T.K.O." by Teddy Pendergrass.

== Personnel ==
Instruments

- Guitars – Lamar "MyGuyMars" Edwards, Andrew White, Matt Spatola

Technical and production

- Engineering – Mya Harrison, Derek Anderson
- Mastering – Malcolm Tariq
- Mixing – Derek Anderson, Malcolm Tariq
- Production – Lamar "MyGuyMars" Edwards, Lyle LeDuff, Philip "Hardwerk" Constable, Carlos McKinney
- Additional production – Khirye Tyler

Visuals and imagery

- Graphic design – Theresa Harrison, Carlos Perales
- Photography – Reesee of Zigga Zagga, Baxter Stapleton
- Videography – Josh Sikkema, Dana Rice, Baxter Stapleton, Michael Korte, Kumari Suraj, Jeremy Strong, Kaelynn Harris, Oth'than, Kelly Yvonne, Ysabelle Capitule

== Charts ==
Chart performance
Chart (2018)	Peak position
US Independent Albums (Billboard)	41

== Release history ==
Release dates and formats
Region	Date	Format(s)	Label	Ref.
Various	April 20, 2018	CD; digital download; streaming	Planet 9; The Orchard	
