= T.K.O. Tour =

2018 concert tour by Mýa

- Tour by Mýa
- T.K.O. Summer Tour Dates
- Associated album: T.K.O. (The Knock Out)
- Start date: June 9, 2018
- End date: September 29, 2018
- Legs: 1
- No. of shows: 20 in North America; 1 in Europe; 2 in Asia; 2 in Middle East; 25 in total

Mýa concert chronology
- Smoove Jones Show Tour (2016); T.K.O. Tour (2018); Queens of R&B Tour (2024)

The T.K.O. Tour was a concert tour by American singer Mya. The singer's fourth concert tour, it was launched in support of her eighth studio album, T.K.O. (The Knock Out). The tour's trek began June 9, 2018 and concluded September 29, 2018.

== Shows ==
List of concerts
Date	City	Country	Venue	Opening act
June 9, 2018	Atlantic City	United States	KISS KISS	—N/a
June 15, 2018	Charlotte	United States	STATS	—N/a
June 16, 2018	Washington D.C.	United States	BLISS	—N/a
June 17, 2018 (Note: Part of Chicago Pride Parade.)	Chicago	United States	Chicago Pride Parade	—N/a
June 23, 2018 (Note: Part of Flagstaff Pride.)	Flagstaff	United States	Thorpe Park	—N/a
June 24, 2018 (Note: Part of St. Louis PrideFest.)	St. Louis	United States	Soldiers' Memorial	—N/a
June 30, 2018 (Note: Part of OH MY! Music Festival.)	Amsterdam	Netherlands	Johan Cruyff Arena	—N/a
July 1, 2018	New York City	United States	Highline Ballroom	—N/a
July 3, 2018	Detroit	United States	Annex	—N/a
July 6, 2018	Houston	United States	MYNT	—N/a
July 14, 2018 (Note: Part of Ice Cream Summerfest.)	Toronto	Canada	Woodbine Racetrack	—N/a
July 21, 2018	Atlanta	United States	Suite	—N/a
July 28, 2018	Miami	United States	Exchange	—N/a
August 2, 2018	San Diego	United States	Music Box	—N/a
August 4, 2018	Los Angeles	United States	El Rey Theatre	—N/a
August 11, 2018	Paradise (Note: Billed as Las Vegas.)	United States	Hard Rock Live	Cameron Calloway
August 12, 2018	Los Angeles	United States	OHM	—N/a
August 18, 2018	Shibuya	Japan	TK Lounge	—N/a
August 19, 2018	Tokyo	Japan	Legend Tokyo	—N/a
August 25, 2018 (Note: Part of Vegan Soulfest.)	Baltimore	United States	Clifton Park	—N/a
September 2, 2018 (Note: Part of Hot Summer Night concert.)	Concord	United States	Concord Pavilion	—N/a
September 13, 2018	Abu Dhabi	United Arab Emirates	EMPIRE	—N/a
September 14, 2018	Dubai	United Arab Emirates	Sensation	—N/a
September 28, 2018	Manchester	United States	Shaskeen	—N/a
September 29, 2018	Atlantic City	United States	KISS KISS	—N/a
