= Sweet XVI =

EP by Mya
- Released: April 21, 2014
- Genre: R&B
- Length: 19:35
- Labels: Planet 9; Ingrooves
- Producers: Antione Hart; Desmond "Bighead Dez" Peterson; Big Duke; Tha Real Orlando; Maurice "Velly" Conway; Nate "Impact" Jolley

Mya chronology
With Love (2014)	Sweet XVI (2014)	Love Elevation Suite (2015)

Sweet XVI is the second extended play by American singer Mya. A follow-up to its predecessor With Love, Sweet XVI symbolized the singer's longevity in the music industry – comprises six brand new songs executive produced by Mya and producer Yonni. Considered a "change of pace" and "the perfect vibe for Spring," Sweet XVI is an uptempo spring music collection extended play which encompasses R&B, hip-hop, soul, and trap.

In celebration of her debut studio album's anniversary, the singer released Sweet XVI April 21, 2014 on her label imprint Planet 9 with distribution via Ingrooves. Preceding the extended play's release, "Same Page," a collaboration with singer-songwriter Eric Bellinger was released as the first and only promotional single.

== Music and lyrics ==
Sweet XVI opens with the "inspirational" mid-tempo "Super Woman" where the singer raps courtesy of executive producer Yonni, Terrell Sass and John Elmore. Additional production contribution was provided by Orlando Williamson, Chaz D. Jackson, Joel Powell, and Mark Strowbridge. It is followed by the extended play's second track, the "catchy" old-school hip-hop flavoured cut "Cherry Lips." Track three, "Same Page," is a silky-electro R&B jam and collaboration with singer-songwriter Eric Bellinger. Released as the first and only single, "Same Page" premiered via Complex – highlights the benefits of communication and compromise in a healthy relationship with lyrics:"Even though we love to fight/We don't wanna waste no time/We shut up and just apologize/No matter who's wrong or who's right. "Right Now," a "racy," "sensual" ode serves as the extended play's fourth track and finds the singer's doing her own background vocals with Auto-tune. Track five, the "power" anthem "M.O.N.E.Y" is a synth-heavy banger which lean on the ATL hip-hop sound. The extended play's sixth track features rapper Mic Check; the track incorporates a pop friendly sound amplified with piano to convey the singer's message of perseverance and positivity with lyrics – "I've had so many wrongs that I've lost count/But it made me who I am and I wouldn't change a thing/'Cause he crown me like a king."

== Release and promotion ==
Mya announced the release of her second extended play Sweet XVI via her Instagram account, writing to her fans, "Thanks for ridin' with me for the past 16 years." Sweet XVI was released April 21, 2014 through the singer's label imprint Planet 9 with distribution via Ingrooves on digital and streaming platforms.

=== Promotional singles ===
"Same Page," a silky electro R&B collaboration with singer-songwriter Eric Bellinger was released as the first and only promotional single where it premiered via online publication Complex upon the extended play's release.

== Track listing ==
No.	Title	Writer(s)	Producer(s)	Length
1.	"Super Woman"	Mya Harrison; Melissa Dogonyaro; Cliff Lewis	Yonni; Terell Sass; John Elmore; Orlando Williamson^{[a]}; Chaz D. Jackson^{[a]}; Joel Powell^{[a]}; Mark Strowbridge^{[a]}	3:45
2.	"Cherry Lips"	Carlton Rucker; Tracey "Jeannie" Jones; Harrison	Nate "Impact" Jolley	3:15
3.	"Same Page" (featuring Eric Bellinger)	Eric Bellinger; Aaron JacQuar Smith; Harrison	Yonni; Tha Real Orlando	2:58
4.	"Right Now"	Shaunice "Sha Sha" Jones	Yonni; Tha Real Orlando	2:31
5.	"M.O.N.E.Y"	Zekuumba "BG" Zekkariyas; Desmond Peterson; Harrison	Desmond "Bighead Dez" Peterson; Big Duke	3:24
6.	"Unbreakable"	Antione Hart; Harrison	Antione Hart; Maurice "Velly" Conway	3:40

Notes

- ^{^[a]} signifies an additional producer

== Release history ==
Region	Date	Format	Label	Ref.
Various	April 21, 2014	Digital download; streaming	Planet 9; Ingrooves	
