= With Love (Mya EP) =

EP by Mýa
- Released: February 14, 2014
- Recorded: Planet 9 Studio
- Genres: R&B; soul
- Length: 11:59
- Label: Planet 9
- Producers: Mýa Harrison (exec.); Yonny (exec.); Antione Hart; Squat

Mýa chronology
K.I.S.S. (Keep It Sexy & Simple) (2011)	With Love (2014)	Sweet XVI (2014)

With Love is the debut extended play by American singer Mýa. Her first EP, it marks Harrison's fourth independently released project through her own label imprint Planet 9 via INgrooves and released on February 14, 2014 worldwide via iTunes. The four track EP commemorates the release of her debut single "It's All About Me" and 16th anniversary in the entertainment industry.

== Background ==
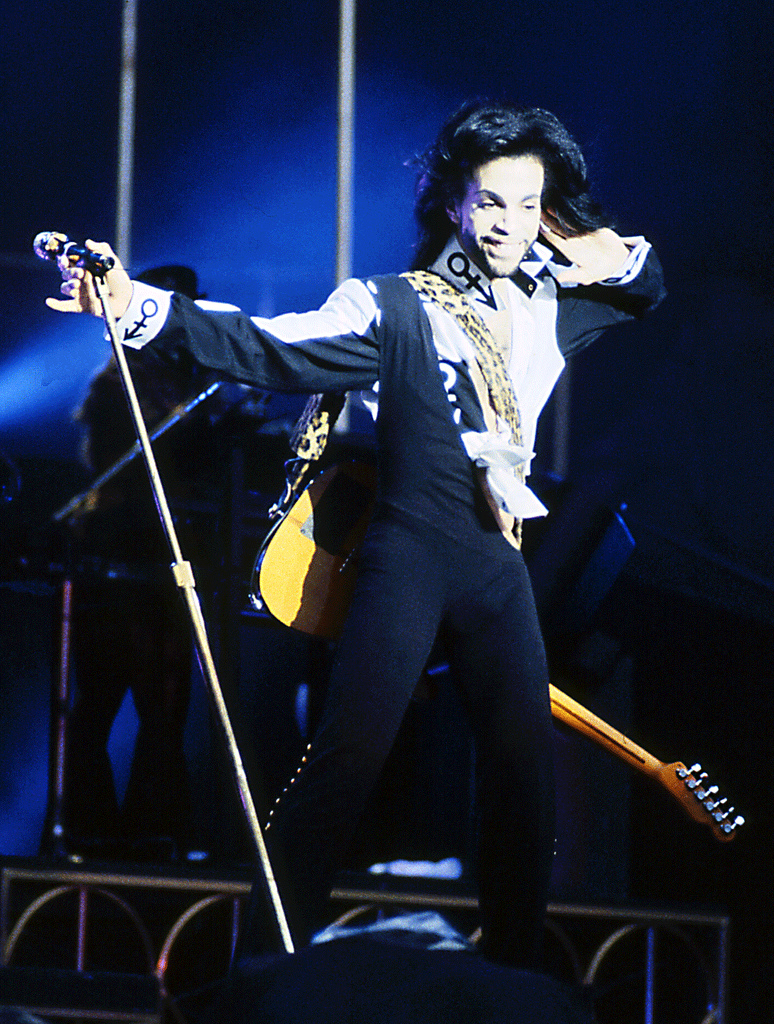
Harrison took wise business advice from mentor Prince regarding ownership of her records and decided to go the independent route.

Just as before on previous projects, Harrison served as executive producer for With Love (alongside record producer Yonny) which entailed her scouting the producers, songwriters, arranging the album track listing, and keeping track of the accounting. Her sixth studio album K.I.S.S. (Keep It Sexy & Simple) was an international release with a variety of different genres. However, with this EP, Harrison chose particular songs that suited the Valentine's Day theme. In an interview with Page31.com, she spoke more on the EP and how it came to be orchestrated, saying:

"Well, I've been recording now for years and years and I wanted to put something together for the fans. I made some resolutions about what this year is going to look like for me and that's how it started. This is just my V-Day treat."

As the interview continued, she described the EP's creative and recording process, stating, "You know, I didn't go into the studio saying 'I'm going to make a V-Day EP'. I stay in the studio. I have a studio in LA and DC and I travel with a studio, so I'm always creating all kinds of stuff of all different genres and on every track there is musicianship and live music. There's really nothing that I'm chasing other than putting people in the mood. That's what music should be: an experience. That's why I chose these particular songs around Valentine's Day."

== Release ==
Two days before release, Harrison began uploading and teasing fans with snippets of the four-track EP on her SoundCloud account. At midnight EST on February 14, 2014, With Love was made available for purchase worldwide through Harrison's label imprint Planet 9 and INgrooves on iTunes and Amazon, etc. With Love commemorates the release of her debut single "It's All About Me" (February 14, 1998) and 16th anniversary in the entertainment industry.

== Critical reception ==
Professional ratings
Review scores
Source	Rating
Los Angeles Times	(favorable)
Soul Bounce	(favorable)
Wetpaint	(favorable)

Upon its release, With Love received universal acclaim from music critics. Gerrick D. Kennedy of Los Angeles Times gave With Love a positive review and called the EP "Mýa's long overdue comeback", writing "From the frank sexuality of 'Do It' to the anthemic 'Like a Woman', the four-track EP is a reminder of why Mýa is missed on the R&B scene."

Soul Bounce writer J. Ly gave the EP a positive review as well, and spoke of its production, stating, "The four-song EP dips into musical fare we've come to expect from the triple threat – contemporary R&B spiced with of-the-moment hip-hop – but also shows progression in vocals and melodies borrowed from the same recipe as her Moodring album." He continued by saying "Though it barely clocks in at 12 minutes long, With Love feels like a reintroduction to Mýa." Referring to the EP as a whole, Ly concluded: "Maybe it's us missing her that makes the EP so refreshing or maybe it's just fun to have new material. Either way, With Love is worth a spin of encouragement."

Wetpaint critic Lindsay Dreyer commented on Harrison's voice and the EP's production as well, opining, "Though her voice definitely has a more seasoned quality, it hasn't lost its purity — 'Like a Woman' is about as pristine as it gets, while all three uptempo jams, 'Space', 'House Party', and 'Do It' bring back a late-'90s vibe."

== Track listing ==
No.	Title	Writer(s)	Producer(s)	Length
1.	"Space"	Mýa Harrison; Latisha Hyman; Cliff Lewis	Yonny; Squat	2:39
2.	"Like a Woman"	Harrison; Antione Hart	Antione Hart	2:31
3.	"House Party"	Harrison; Trevor Wesley; Cliff Lewis	Yonny	3:53
4.	"Do It"	ShaSha Jones; Cheyenne Surratt; Cliff Lewis; Harrison	Yonny	2:56

== Personnel ==
Credits adapted from Mýa's SoundCloud account.

Managerial

- Executive producer – Mýa Harrison, Yonny
- Management – Sherman Harrison, Mike Killmon, Carol Rosenthal, Crystal Bozeman, Troy Ramsey, Tatiana Noboa

Visuals and imagery

- Photography – Reesee of Zigga Zagga Productions
- Graphic design – Carlos Perales of Planet 9

Instruments

- Guitar – Brent Paschke, Walt Williams IV
- Keyboard – Davion Botts, Leonard Siggers

Technical and production

- Backing vocals – Sam Hook
- Mastering – Brandon Bishop
- Mixing – Daniel Laporte, Ben "Bengineer" Chang
- Additional production – Robert Williams, Brent Paschke, Desmond Peterson, Orlando Williamson

== Release history ==
Region	Date	Format	Label
Australia	February 14, 2014	Digital download	Planet 9/INgrooves
Canada	February 14, 2014	Digital download	Planet 9/INgrooves
Ireland	February 14, 2014	Digital download	Planet 9/INgrooves
Netherlands	February 14, 2014	Digital download	Planet 9/INgrooves
Sweden	February 14, 2014	Digital download	Planet 9/INgrooves
United Kingdom	February 14, 2014	Digital download	Planet 9/INgrooves
United States	February 14, 2014	Digital download	Planet 9/INgrooves
