= Beauty & the Streets Vol. 1 =

Mixtape by Mya
- Released: September 29, 2009
- Recorded: 2008–2009
- Studios: The Base Studios (Washington, D.C.); D4L Studios (Atlanta, Georgia); The Cutting Room Studios; Grindhouse Studios (New York City, New York); Madd Studios; Music World Studios (Houston, Texas)
- Genres: Hip-hop; Southern hip-hop; R&B
- Length: 67:05
- Labels: Planet 9; Young Empire Music Group; Fontana
- Producers: The Bama Boyz; Big Tyme; D. Botts; Mike "Trauma" D.; Jugrnaut; Jimmy Klev; Mr. Lee; Black Mike; Cory Mo; T-Minus; Joe Traxx; C. Wallace; Yonny

Mya chronology
Sugar & Spice (2008)	Beauty & the Streets Vol. 1 (2009)	K.I.S.S. (Keep It Sexy & Simple) (2011)

Singles from Beauty & the Streets Vol. 1
- 1. "Show Me Somethin'" Released: August 31, 2009

Beauty & the Streets Vol. 1 is the debut mixtape by American singer Mya. It is her first mixtape to be released by Young Empire Music Group with distribution from Fontana Distribution on September 29, 2009. The project came to surface when Harrison felt as though she had abandoned her U.S. fan base and wanted to release music for them. The mixtape served as Harrison's second independently released project on her own label imprint Planet 9 and was created to serve the "clubs, strip clubs, whips, and bedroom" with a predominantly southern sound.

Production on Beauty & the Streets Vol. 1 was primarily handled by in-house producers selected by Harrison; Young Yonny, The Bama Boyz, T-Minus, Arkatech Beatz and a host of others. Just as she did previously with her fifth studio album Sugar & Spice (2008), Harrison lent a hand in the songwriting process, co-writing several of the mixtape's tracks with many different artists and songwriters and served as executive producer to the project. Guest features included a then unknown Nicki Minaj, Houston native rappers Bun B, Chamillionaire, Trae, Slim Thug and Z-Ro and Atlanta rapper Shawty Lo.

Beauty & the Streets Vol. 1 spawned two promotional singles; the Bun B-assisted "Show Me Somethin'" and the T-Minus-produced track "Black Out". Although both singles were released to iTunes, neither single was serviced to radio.

Beauty & the Streets Vol. 1 debuted at number fifty-five on the Billboard Top R&B/Hip-Hop Albums chart on October 17, 2009.

== Background ==
In 2009, Harrison spoke with Rolling Out magazine, elaborating more on her hiatus from music and decision to go independent:

"I've never stopped doing music. I've created a label called Planet 9 and I released an album in Japan. I invested in my own studio and it cut the recording cost down 95 percent. I have my own in-house producers and they are not as expensive as an established producer. The return is greater and now I own my masters. I see six dollars per album sold versus 10 cents. You may not sell as many units because you don’t put as much money in promotions, but the returns are better."

Later in the interview, Harrison voiced her opinion on the major difference between major record labels and independent labels, saying "Major labels have a system that you have to go through. The people in power dictate how things should sound and where the money is spent. But when you become your own boss, you check every line item and you have to be cautious."

== Development ==
Prior to Harrison recording Beauty & the Streets Vol. 1, she released her first independent album Sugar & Spice (2008) in Japan. While Sugar & Spice catered more toward her Japanese fans, Beauty & the Streets Vol. 1 is an R&B/hip-hop album. In an interview with BrownSista, Harrison elaborated more on her direction to record a mixtape:

Well, people have actually asked me before about doing a mix tape. I stepped of the scene for a minute. Teamed up with Young Empire and there is a demand for Mya to come back but I had to come back in a different way. Because I have a fan base and reputation for doing so many collaborations I'm like I want to do that and you know that rap dominates now so this is for the jeeps. The mix tape is really about who Mya is and the streets. If I have anything to do with it I am going to keep serving my fans. There should never be a time for any artist where they aren't providing for their fans just because there is funny business going on.

Harrison later gave further details to Rolling Out magazine, adding "It's a setup to keep the streets hot until my album comes out in 2010. So this is to service my fans with music now that I'm in the position to do so."

== Track listing ==
Beauty & the Streets Vol. 1 track listing
No.	Title	Writer(s)	Producer(s)	Length
1.	"I'm Back" (Slim Thug featuring Mya)	Mya Harrison, Christopher Moore, Stayve Thomas	Jimmy Klev	5:03
2.	"About My B.I." (Shawty Lo featuring Mya)	Harrison, C. Moore, S. A. Baker, Q. Jordan	Mike "Trauma" D., Jugrnaut	4:39
3.	"Show Me Somethin' " (featuring Bun B)	Harrison, A. Harrison, T. Beal, T. Ramsey, B. Freeman	D. Botts	4:05
4.	"Boss" (featuring Z-Ro)	Harrison, T. Beal, J. McVey	Big Tyme	4:13
5.	"Ponytail" (featuring Nicki Minaj)	Harrison, T. Beal, O. Maraj	C. Wallace	4:53
6.	"$ Can't Buy My Love"	Harrison, C. Moore	Black Mike	4:50
7.	"Control Freak" (featuring Gator Mane)	Harrison, E. Williams, K. Piper	Mr. Lee	5:07
8.	"Club Go Crazy" (Chamillionaire featuring Mya)	Harrison, C. Moore, H. Seriki	Yonny	3:56
9.	"Now or Lata" (Blo Pop featuring Mya)	Harrison, T. Beal, C. Moore	Cory Mo	4:01
10.	"Manaholic"	Harrison, T. Beal, T. Ramsey	The Bama Boyz	4:51
11.	"Go Hard or Go Home"	Harrison, T. Beal	R. Lee	5:19
12.	"Full Service" (Trae featuring Mya)	Harrison, C. Moore, F. Thompson	Joe Traxx	4:43
13.	"The Only One"	Harrison	Yonny	4:02
14.	"Work It Out"	Harrison, T. Beal, C. Moore	D. Botts	4:00
15.	"Black Out"	Harrison, Chanell	T-Minus	3:27

== Personnel ==
=== Production ===
- Mýa – composer, engineer, producer, executive producer
- The Bama Boyz – producer, engineer
- Brandon Bishop – mixing
- Cory Mo – producer, engineer, mixing
- Mike Dean – mixing
- B. Freeman – composer
- Tom Gardner – engineer
- A. Harrison – composer
- Aaron "Swamp" Holland – engineer
- R. Lee – producer
- J. McVey – composer
- Mike Mo – engineer, mastering, mixing
- C. Moore – composer
- Reverend C.L. Moore – vocal arrangement
- T. Ramsey – composer
- S. Thomas – composer
- C. Nwasike – producer
- E. Williams – composer

== Charts ==
Chart performance
Chart (2009)	Peak position
US Top R&B/Hip-Hop Albums (Billboard)	55

== Release history ==
Release dates and formats
Region	Date	Format(s)	Label(s)	Ref.
Various	September 29, 2009	Digital download; CD	Young Empire Music Group; Fontana; Planet 9	
