= Mya (singer) =

American singer and actress (born 1979)

Mýa
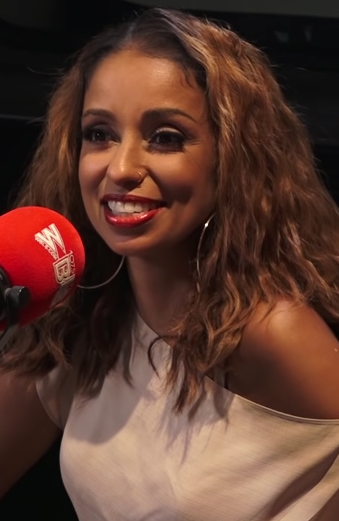
- Mya in 2018
- Born: Mya Marie Harrison; October 10, 1979 (age 47); Washington, D.C., U.S.
- Other names: My My; Mya-Re; Smoove Jones; Mýa Lan$ky
- Education: Eleanor Roosevelt High School
- Occupations: Singer; songwriter; dancer; actress
- Years active: 1996–present
- Works: Discography; songs; performances; filmography; videos
- Awards: Full list
- Musical career
- Genres: R&B; pop; hip-hop
- Labels: Interscope; A&M; Universal Motown; Manhattan; University Music; Planet 9; The Orchard; Virgin
- Website: myamya.com

Mya Marie Harrison (/ˈmaɪə/; born October 10, 1979), known professionally as Mýa, is an American singer, songwriter, dancer, and actress. She was born in Washington, D.C. and studied ballet, jazz, and tap dance as a child. Her career began in television as a dance posse member on BET's Teen Summit. She signed with University Records, an imprint of Interscope Records to release her first album Mya (1998). The album was led by her first single, "It's All About Me" (featuring Sisqó), which peaked within the top ten of the Billboard Hot 100. Her subsequent collaborative singles, "Ghetto Supastar (That Is What You Are)" (with Pras and Ol' Dirty Bastard) and "Take Me There" (with Blackstreet and Mase), were also met with commercial success.

Her second studio album, Fear of Flying (2000), peaked at number 15 on the Billboard 200 and received platinum certification by the Recording Industry Association of America (RIAA); all three of its singles—"The Best of Me" (featuring Jadakiss), "Free" and "Case of the Ex"—entered the Billboard Hot 100, the latter of which peaked at number two. Released the following year, a collaborative cover of the song "Lady Marmalade" (with Christina Aguilera, Pink and Lil' Kim)—recorded for the 2001 musical film Moulin Rouge!—peaked atop the Billboard Hot 100, along with twelve international charts, and won Best Pop Collaboration with Vocals at the 44th Annual Grammy Awards. Mýa was granted wider creative control of her third studio album, Moodring (2003). The album spawned the singles "My Love Is Like...Wo" and "Fallen" and received gold certification by the RIAA.

Mýa signed with Universal Motown Records for her fourth studio album, Liberation (2007). The album only received a limited release and she left the label the following year. In 2008, under the mentorship of J. Prince, Mýa established her own label, Planet 9, on which she released her fifth and sixth studio albums, Sugar & Spice (2008) and K.I.S.S. (Keep It Sexy & Simple) (2011). Beginning in 2014, she released three R&B–rooted extended plays (EPs): With Love (2014), Sweet XVI (2014), and Love Elevation Suite (2015). In 2016, her seventh album, Smoove Jones received a nomination for Best R&B Album at the 59th Annual Grammy Awards. Its follow-up, T.K.O. (The Knock Out) (2018), commemorated the twentieth anniversary of her debut album.

Mýa has also ventured into acting across film, television, broadway, and gaming. She made her cinematic debut in the thriller In Too Deep (1999). She has since appeared in roles in films including Chicago (2002), Dirty Dancing: Havana Nights (2004), Shall We Dance? (2004), Cursed (2005), Girls Cruise (2019), and House Party (2023). In 2009, Mýa competed in Dancing with the Stars season nine, finishing second place in the competition. Mýa has sold 3.2 million albums in the U.S. and 20 million records worldwide. Her accolades include a Grammy Award, a Screen Actors Guild Award, a Critics' Choice Movie Award and two MTV Video Music Awards. Billboard listed her in their the Hot 100 Artists of the 2000s and Top 100 Women of the 21st Century lists.

== Early life ==
Mya Harrison, a native of Washington, D.C., is the eldest of three children. Her father Sherman "Hajji" Harrison is a singer and performs in an R&B band, Jump Street and her mother Theresa worked as an accountant. She grew up in Prince George's County with her two younger brothers Chaz and Nijel. In her youth, Mýa dealt with bullying growing up as a biracial young person with a black father and a white mother.

She started ballet classes shortly afterward 1992, followed by tap and jazz, but lost interest when she was eight. At 12, she found videos of her dancing and her interest in dance was rekindled.

Mýa studied tapes of Tony Award winner Savion Glover until she learned his routines and then joined the group T.W.A. (Tappers With Attitude). She was solo before heading to New York to study with Glover in a residency with the Dance Theater of Harlem. Soon after, she earned a reputation for improvisation and Glover gave her a solo spot during a Kennedy Center performance.

Mýa subsequently appeared on BET's Teen Summit and began to teach dance to children when she was 14. She also had taken violin lessons since the fourth grade. Her strict upbringing emphasized the value of school and working hard to get good grades. When her father first heard her sing, he had her record demo tapes and took them to a club where he was playing. There he met A. Haqq Islam, President and CEO of University Music. Islam agreed to come to Mýa's home, where she sang him two En Vogue songs. Impressed with her audition, Islam signed her to a deal via his label and negotiated a distribution deal through Interscope Records.

After graduating from Eleanor Roosevelt High School in Greenbelt, Maryland at 16, she enrolled in the University of Maryland in speech communications. Mýa left college after one semester to focus on preparing her debut album.

== Career ==
=== 1996–1999: Debut with Mya ===
After signing with Interscope Records, Mýa spent the next two years recording her debut studio album. Islam hired a team of collaborators to work with her including Missy Elliott, Babyface, Diane Warren, Dru Hill, Darryl Pearson and Silkk Tha Shocker, while the staff at Interscope had envisioned to market Mýa as their main female R&B artist, competing with fellow teen singers Aaliyah, Brandy Norwood and Monica. Released in April 1998 to generally favorable reviews, Mya peaked at number 29 on the US Billboard 200 and sold 1.4 million copies domestically. It received a platinum certification by the Recording Industry Association of America (RIAA), denoting shipments to US retailers of over 1,000,000 units. In total, the album sold two million copies worldwide. Mya yielded three successful singles, including her debut single, "It's All About Me" featuring fellow R&B singer Sisqó, which became a top-ten hit on the US Billboard Hot 100, as well as "Movin' On" and "My First Night with You".

The album earned her several accolades including two Soul Train Music Award nominations for Best R&B/Soul or Rap New Artist and Best R&B/Soul Album – Female and an NAACP Image Award nomination for Outstanding New Artist. In addition to her solo work, Mýa, along with Blackstreet, Blinky Blink, and Mase, was featured on "Take Me There" from the soundtrack of the Nickelodeon animated feature film The Rugrats Movie (1998). It reached number one in the New Zealand Singles Chart and became a top twenty hit in several nations, including the United Kingdom, Ireland, the Netherlands, and United States. Mýa also appeared with rapper Ol' Dirty Bastard on Pras' single "Ghetto Supastar", recorded for his debut solo studio album, Ghetto Supastar (1998). A worldwide number-one hit, the song topped the charts in more than a dozen nations and earned Mýa her first Grammy Award nomination in the Best Rap Performance by a Duo or Group category. "Ghetto Supastar" was also featured on the soundtrack for the political satire film Bulworth. In 1999, Mýa made her acting debut in the crime thriller film In Too Deep, directed by Michael Rymer. In the film, she played a young woman named Loretta starring opposite LL Cool J and Omar Epps.

=== 2000–2002: Fear of Flying and Lady Marmalade ===
In late 1999, Mýa began production of the album that would eventually become Fear of Flying with a variety of producers, including Rodney Jerkins, Swizz Beatz, Jimmy Jam & Terry Lewis, and Wyclef Jean. The title was partially inspired by Erica Jong's 1973 novel of the same name. Mýa, who did some writing on her debut album, was heavily involved in the production of Fear of Flying, from writing and recording to producing, mixing, and mastering. Released in April 2000 to mixed reviews, Fear of Flying debuted at number 15 on the Billboard 200 with first week sales of 72,000 copies. Upon initial release, its first single "The Best of Me" featuring Jadakiss had underperformed on the charts and suffered from sophomore slump. The album's second single, "Case of the Ex", proved to be a different matter. "Case of the Ex" became Mýa's international breakthrough hit, topping the Australian Singles Chart for two consecutive weeks, while reaching number two and three in the US and the United Kingdom, respectively, and in turn, solidified Fear of Flying as a hit.

With the success of "Case of the Ex", Interscope rereleased Fear of Flying in November 2000, with a revised track listing featuring two new songs, including the third single "Free". Fear of Flying earned Mýa a Soul Train Music Award nomination for R&B/Soul Album – Female and a MOBO nomination for Best Album. A multiplatinum success, the album sold 1.2 million copies in the United States and eventually received a platinum certification by the Recording Industry Association of America. Subsequently, it earned gold certifications from Canadian Recording Industry Association and Australian Recording Industry Association.

In spring of 2001, Mýa paid tribute to Janet Jackson at MTV Icon. She performed Jackson's hit "The Pleasure Principle". By mid 2001, she had already amassed nine Top 10 hits and sold more than six million albums worldwide. The same year, she was featured on the soundtrack of Atlantis: The Lost Empire, performing the Diane Warren-penned pop ballad "Where the Dream Takes You". The song was featured during the closing credits of the animated feature. Her next music project, Mýa collaborated with singers Christina Aguilera, Lil' Kim, and Pink on the remake of Lady Marmalade", which was the first single on the Moulin Rouge! soundtrack. A worldwide success, it reached number one in over fifteen countries, including the United States, where it spent five consecutive weeks at the top of the Billboard Hot 100. At 2001 MTV Video Music Awards, "Lady Marmalade" was nominated for six awards and won two for Best Video from a Film and Video of the Year. In 2002, the quartet performed "Lady Marmalade" at the 44th Grammy Awards and won a Grammy for Best Pop Collaboration with Vocals.

After the release and success of Fear of Flying and "Lady Marmalade", Mýa began to dabble in acting with a small supporting role in the musical film, Chicago (2002). In March 2003, she appeared on hip-hop alternative group Jurassic 5's remix of "Thin Line".

=== 2003–2007: Moodring and Liberation ===
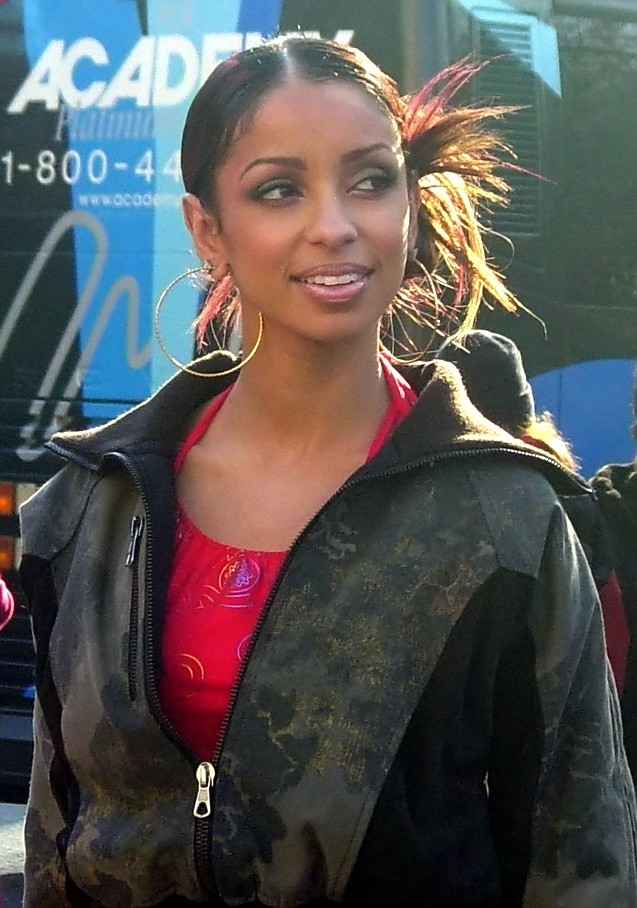
Mýa at the 2003 Macy's Thanksgiving Day Parade in New York City.

In July 2003, Interscope released Mýa's third studio album, Moodring. It sold more than 113,000 copies in its first week and peaked at number three on the US Billboard 200, surpassing Mýa's previous effort first-week sales. The album displayed an array of different emotions exploring Mýa's playful and sexual side. The bulk of Moodring was cowritten and coproduced by Mýa and influenced by different subjects and music stylings including pop rock, soul, hip-hop, R&B, and quiet storm. The first single, the Missy Elliott-produced "My Love Is Like ... Wo" became a top twenty hit on the Billboard Hot 100, while its accompanying music video showcased a more sexy and risqué side of the singer. The second single, mid tempo track "Fallen", failed to duplicate the same success, but reached the top forty on Billboard's Hot R&B/Hip-Hop Songs chart. Moodring stayed on the United States chart for eighteen non-consecutive weeks and went on to be certified gold, selling 589,000 copies to date.

In 2004, she had two small roles in the dance musical Dirty Dancing: Havana Nights and romantic comedy-drama film Shall We Dance?. In the films, she played a Latina lounge singer named Lola Martinez and the fiancée of a ballroom dancing student. The same year, Mýa began working on her fourth studio album. Originally conceived as a project called Control Freak, the album's first version was actually scheduled for a mid-2005 release, but was eventually shelved when Mýa decided to leave her management and A&M Records in fall 2005. In 2005, she had a supporting role in Wes Craven's horror film Cursed, starring Christina Ricci and Joshua Jackson. In the film, Mýa played a young victim by the name of Jenny Tate. Although Cursed tanked at the box office, it earned her a nomination in the Best Frightened Performance category at the 2005 MTV Movie Awards. Mýa guest starred in season two of NCIS. Also in 2005, Mýa featured on rapper Cuban Link's single "Sugar Daddy" from his album Chain Reaction. An official video was filmed in New York City and debuted on 106 & Park.

In 2006, she costarred in the romantic comedy drama The Heart Specialist, written, produced and directed by Dennis Cooper. The same year, she signed a recording contract with Universal Motown and resumed work on her next album, which she completed within a three-month period. Classified as "energetic [and] ghetto" with a less classic R&B edge, Mýa renamed the project Liberation. In March 2007, the album's lead single "Lock U Down", a collaboration with Lil Wayne, was sent to radio. After its commercial failure, a second single entitled "Ridin'" was released, but it also underperformed. Due to budget cuts, the album suffered numerous pushbacks and in mid–2007, it accidentally leaked in Japan, prompting Universal Motown to release Liberation as a digital download only in October 2007. Next up in 2007, Mýa costarred in the independent romantic comedy film The Metrosexual, starring Shaun Benson in the title role. Screened at the Boston Film Festival, the movie received mixed reviews.

=== 2008–2013: Sugar & Spice, Beauty & the Streets and K.I.S.S. (Keep It Sexy & Simple) ===
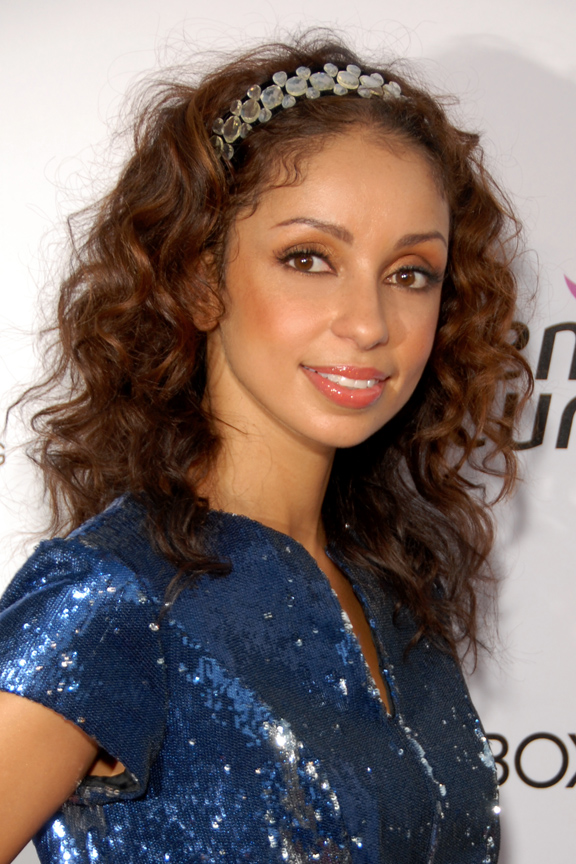
Mýa attending Susan G. Komen's 8th Annual Fashion for the Cure in Hollywood in September 2009.

In 2008, Mýa costarred in the Bill Duke-directed drama thriller film Cover in which she portrayed an AIDS victim named Cynda. Her next film was the direct-to-dvd romantic comedyLove For Sale. Starring opposite Jackie Long and Jason Weaver, Mýa played a college student named Kiely in a bad relationship. Following her departure from Universal Motown, Mýa continued working on new material under her own independent imprint Planet 9 and contracted with Japanese R&B label Manhattan Records to release new material. Her fifth studio album and first project for the label, Sugar & Spice, received a Japan-wide release in December 2008. Specifically recorded for the Asian music market, it was preceded by the single "Paradise" and spawned a reissue edition, released in 2009.

In 2009, Mýa had a supporting role in the comedy drama indie film Bottleworld. It featured an ensemble cast of Anna Camp, Christopher Denham and Scott Wilson. Looking to release more new music, Mýa signed a deal with Young Empire Music Group, and released her first mixtape called Beauty & The Streets Vol.1. It debuted and peaked at number 55 on Billboard's US Top R&B/Hip-Hop Albums. In fall 2009, Mýa appeared as a contestant on season nine of the ABC reality show Dancing with the Stars, partnered with professional dancer Dmitry Chaplin. One of the show's frontrunners throughout the entire competition, she danced on a sprained ankle for the last five weeks and ultimately placed second behind singer Donny Osmond. In 2010, Mýa was invited to be a featured guest vocalist on the number-one hit remake "We Are the World 25 for Haiti". She appeared in The Penthouse, starring Rider Strong. The sex comedy earned largely negative reviews.

In early 2011, she appeared on French DJ and record producer Cedric Gervais's single "Love Is the Answer". Following the collaboration with Cedric Gervais, Mýa released the solo single "Fabulous Life", which served as the first single from the Japanese version of her sixth studio album titled K.I.S.S. (Keep It Sexy & Simple), released in April 2011 in Japan. Production on the project was primarily handled by Cleveland native producer Young Yonny with additional contributions from Japanese musicians Jeff Miyahara and Daisuke Imai, Chuck Harmony and longtime collaborators Carvin & Ivan. As with Sugar & Spice, Mýa took full creative control of the album and lent a hand in the songwriting process, cowriting and executive producing. The album debuted at number 72 on the Oricon Albums Chart. A US version of K.I.S.S. (Keep It Sexy & Simple), featuring several new recordings, was released in December 2011 via iTunes, with up-tempo track "Earthquake" featuring Trina serving as the album's lead single. It debuted and peaked at number 74 on the US Top R&B/Hip-Hop Albums.

=== 2014–2018: Smoove Jones and T.K.O. (The Knock Out) ===
Starting in 2014, Mýa released a series of EPs on her independent label Planet 9. With Love, a four-track Valentine's Day EP, was released in February 2014 to commemorate the release of her debut single "It's All About Me" and sixteenth anniversary in the entertainment industry. It received largely positive review from music critics. In April 2014, Mýa starred opposite Linda Hamilton in the Syfy original TV movie Bermuda Tentacles, which garnered negative reviews. The same month, her second EP Sweet XVI was released to commemorate the release of her debut studio album Mya. It was followed by her second Valentine's Day EP, Love Elevation Suite, released in 2015.

Mýa's seventh studio album Smoove Jones was released on February 14, 2016. It was preceded by the singles "Welcome to My World" and "Team You". Smoove Jones debuted at number 30 on Billboard's Top R&B/Hip-Hop Albums chart on March 5, 2016. A critical success, it received a Grammy Award nomination for Best R&B Album at the 59th ceremony. In early September 2017, Mýa announced the upcoming release of a new single entitled "Ready for Whatever", but gave no date for the release. "Ready for Whatever" was released September 22, 2017, as the first single from her forthcoming studio project. Less than two months later, Mýa released a remix titled, "Ready, Part II" on November 25, 2017. On February 14, 2018, Mýa released "You Got Me" as her second single from her forthcoming studio album TKO (The Knock Out) to commemorate the twentieth anniversary of her debut single "It's All About Me". Mya starred as Mina Kennedy in the UMC's original series drama 5th Ward The Series. It premiered March 2, 2018. She continued to release a slew of singles that included "Damage" and "Knock You Out". Her thirteenth studio project TKO (The Knock Out) was released April 20, 2018, commemorating the anniversary of her debut album Mya (1998).

A new single entitled, "G.M.O. (Got My Own)" featuring Tink was released on August 31, 2018.

=== 2019–2025: Further acting and musical collaborations ===
Mýa costarred in a new VH1 reality television series, titled Girls Cruise with Lil' Kim and Chilli. It premiered July 15, 2019. In February 2019, Mýa released "With You" to honor the anniversary of her debut single. Approximately, two months later, "Down" was released to commemorate the one year anniversary of TKO (The Knock Out). The following month, Mýa released "Open" on May 13, 2019. In June, she released the riddim collaboration "Handsfree" with dancehall artist Ding Dong. Mýa had announced a new single "Whine" was set to drop soon, however nothing ever materialize. In November 2019, Mýa collaborated with Canadian rapper Tory Lanez and was featured on his album Chixtape 5.

In April 2020, Mýa released the single "You Got Me, Part II". A month later, the singer released "Space and Time" on May 29, 2020. Throughout the year, Mýa continued to release a series of singles; the DJ Alyx Ander assisted EDM track "Without You", the midtempo cut, "I Deserve It", uptempo banger, "I'ma Do It", and heartfelt ballad, "Just Call My Name".

In 2021, she released dual singles, "Forever My Love" and "True Love" to coincide with her debut single anniversary. In February, she costarred in the Tubi streaming platform action movie Lazarus. In July 2021, the singer released "Worth It" introducing her alter ego "Mya Lan$ky". In December, Mýa starred in the Lifetime's original Christmas movie, My Favorite Christmas Melody alongside Rainbow Sun Francks.

In January 2022, Mýa made a guest appearance on the ABC reality show Shark Tank. In June 2022, Mýa reunited with Christina Aguilera for a special performance of "Lady Marmalade" at LA Pride.

In January 2023, Mýa made a cameo in the rebooted comedy film House Party. In August 2023, she released a song called "Whine," a dancehall reggae collaboration featuring Jamaican dance-hall musician Bounty Killer. On October 10, 2023, the singer released an extended play of "Whine" dance mixes.

In February 2024, the singer released "Anytime," a standalone single to commemorate the anniversary of her debut single. In April 2024, she collaborated with Junior Sanchez on the dance collaboration "So Hype;" an official music video, directed by Lauren Hashian and Spicy Rico, followed on May 15, 2024.

On May 9, 2025, the singer released her new single "Face to Face" in partnership with Virgin Music Group. On June 9, 2025, she performed "Case of the Ex" at the 2025 BET Awards as a part of the tribute to 106 & Park and its twenty-fifth anniversary. The following day, she released her first single the funky 80's inspired "Give It To You" from her forthcoming studio album. In September 2025, the singer starred in rapper Joyner Lucas's music video for the song "NVM." Beginning in October, the singer performed a few spot dates on Brandy and Monica's The Boy Is Mine Tour. In addition, to commemorate the twenty-fifth anniversary of her sophomore album, in late October 2025, the singer released Fear of Flying on vinyl for the first time.

=== 2026: Retrospect ===
In January 2026, Variety reported that Mya was set to team up with singers Dionne Warwick and Saweetie for a new version of Diane Warren's "One Heart", the title track from the forthcoming animation film Ozi: Voice of the Forest for climate change awareness. On January 30, the singer released her single "A.S.A.P." from her forthcoming studio album via her label imprint Planet 9. On February 2, 2026, the singer announced her first new studio album in eight years, Retrospect; the album is Mýa's ninth studio LP. On March 12, Mya joined the Pussycat Dolls' forthcoming PCD Forever Tour as a special guest for the North American dates. However, the North America trek of the tour was canceled, attributing it to poor ticket sales. On May 1, 2026, Mya released the second single from the forthcoming studio album, "Just a Little Bit" featuring Too $hort. Retrospect was released on May 15, 2026. In June 2026, the singer signed with WME agency for representation in all areas. On July 6, 2026, Mya performed in an Aaliyah tribute, curated by Missy Elliott, for the finale at that year's Essence Festival of Culture. In August 2026, the singer received a star on South Africa Walk of Fame. On September 25, 2026, her collaboration with Dionne Warwick and Saweetie will be released in conjunction with the forty-fifth annual International World Peace Day. That same date, the singer will be honored as well by actor Forest Whitaker's Whitaker Peace and Development Initiative (WPDI) hosting its "Rise As One" gala at Gotham Hall in New York City.

== Artistry ==
=== Voice and songwriting ===
I'm just happy to be here. I think being a young artist, just starting out of high school, what kids listen to is club music. We don't necessarily get too deep or sing like Aretha Franklin. That's not even what music is truly about today. It's sad, but I want to give a little bit of sex, being fabulous or sassy. I definitely want to be able to sing and back that up, and being a dancer first has sort of given me a complex that I have to be able to sing, period, with a band. If I break my leg, I'd like to give a show without pyrotechnics and choreography every five seconds.

— Mýa, Yahoo! Music

Mýa possesses a mezzo-soprano vocal range that spans four octaves with particularly the tonality and timbre of her voice being highlighted and described as "very special". Writing for Slate, Sasha Frere-Jones acknowledged although Mýa's breathy voice suggests smallness, she easily accommodates with up-to-date melisma, unadorned legato, and quiet crooning. Stephen Thomas Erlewine of AllMusic commented that Mýa has a voice that is at once sounding "innocent and knowing", while consistently "upbeat and confident". Similarly, Billboard complimented her voice for having a "smooth, sensitive, angelic tone" to it who oozes with the confidence and stylistic flair of an artist twice her age.

Other music critics have referred to her voice as "weak" and "thin". In reviewing for her second studio album Fear of Flying, Jon Azpiri of AllMusic commented that "she is a promising young talent, but still has yet to develop the chops necessary to rank among the best of R&B divas." Rolling Stone wrote, "The signature quiver in Mya's voice does give her some sonic identity, but otherwise this could be the music of Destiny's Child, Aaliyah or any of the countless interchangeable hip-hop/R&B divas."

In an interview with Yahoo! Music conducted in 2003, the singer defended her voice and commented, "It's not necessary to sing LOUD every song; I think people associate singing loud with being able to truly sing, and I don't think that is true." She further mentions her Coca-Cola appearance and remarked, "I think that when people heard me sing the Coca-Cola commercial they were like, "Oh, I didn't know she could sing!" But that was just singing loud. So there are a lot of misconceptions just about singing, period." The singer concluded her notion with the statement, "I'm just happy to be here. I like to sing loud, I like to sing soft, I just like to feel good, period. It's not that serious."

Since the beginning of her career, Mýa has always been artistically involved in her career. She writes the majority of her own material for her studio albums. In an interview, she explained she writes 99.9% of her albums, and when songs are submitted to her, if she feels the song is something that feels like something she can perform well and hits close to home, then she feels comfortable doing it. Her lyrics usually fall somewhere between hopeful and melancholy. The singer is also known for writing sexually-driven lyrics and female empowerment compositions with a bit of an edge to them through her love for free-spirited word play. Her music typically "bridge the gap between" pop/R&B and "street-level" hip-hop. According to writer Cynthia Fuchs from PopMatters it's difficult to categorize Mya, because she has a "tendency to blend music genres". Her third album Moodring, consisted of various genres including, R&B, hip-hop, Techno, pop and reggae. Revolt's Jon Powell appreciates the singer's authenticity in her work because "she keeps the through-line simple — crisp vocals, dancer-level precision, and songwriting that treats romance, confidence, and self-respect as the main plot, not filler."

In an interview with People, she revealed she draws her musical inspirations from humming a melody off the note of a whirring fan or tapping her foot to the rhythm of the bathtub dripping; commenting she can hear melodies from natural sounds like birds chirping or the taxis and construction in Manhattan. Occasionally, Mýa wishes she could stop the music. "In the middle of a conversation, I'll start humming or moving my feet, and my friends will say, 'You can't be serious,'" she notes. "It's such a reflex that I'm totally unaware I look like an idiot." Most of her songs are helmed from personal experiences in her life as well as friends' experiences.

Mýa has coproduced most of her records since 2000. She has her own recording studio and label imprint, Planet 9 and is heavily involved in the production of her music and every single process, from writing and recording to producing, mixing, and mastering her own projects. Mýa is very active in all aspects of her career from the actual production to the business; formulating the beat, creating the concept, and coming up with the melodies.

=== Stage ===
Mýa has received praise for her stage presence and live performances, cementing her status as an exceptional vocalist and performer. Writing for The Source, Shawn Grant praised the singer's voice as "immaculate," he salutes the singer "ability to connect with a crowd" based on her "sheer talent" without relying on "spectacular choreography" or "elaborate production" that he deems are "merely enhancements," not necessities, for a performer of her caliber. He ends with the sentiment, Mýa "a great vocalist who shines brightest when the spotlight is focused on her ability alone." Author Stacy-Deanne opined that Mýa had developed into a well rounded-performer with flexible abilities who was consistently a "source of attraction" on television and on tour. Staff writer Trish Davis of Hartford Courant described her presence as "compelling" while noting, "With a voice that sends high notes with clarity and low ones with force, Mya's live act is solid." Music writer Charles Passey commended the singer's performance at SunFest and expressed approval of her artistry to "offer a musical menu both bouncy and unpretentious" and felt "unlike a lot of female pop stars these days, she's got a voice to go along with her moves." Journalist Jami Gordillo-Kerby of The Fresno Bee revered the singer's concert at The Big Fresno Fair. She took noticed of how "the singer kept the upper hand," commenting "She was cool, confident and totally in control." On top of that, she applauded the singer's prowess as a performer to continuously to "engaged with her fans during her entire performance" and was in awe by how "the attention stayed on the confident diva who prowled the stage like she owned it," sharing — "She lit up the place with her exuberance and singing and dancing skills." She concluded her review on this sentiment, "Mya proved repeatedly in her Fresno concert that she has the voice to be a major force in R&B for years to come." Reviewing for The Press of Atlantic City, staff writer Vincent Jackson was most impressed by "how well the singer sings live" and "better than some of her entertainment contemporaries." He concluded his review commenting, "She's clearly an entertainer whose star is on the rise." The AU Review's Chris Singh lauded her showmanship, which he recognized has not "aged" nor her "dulcet notes" that stole the show, citing Mýa as "versatile" and a "tough act to follow". Similarly, Kelefa Sanneh of The New York Times praised her live performance, noting her dance movements in particular, which he described as "sprightly", "sexy" and "theatrical". Natasha Pinto of The Music commented, "She possesses the dreamiest falsetto and commands attention with every note and step she takes", acknowledging Mýa's ability to perform with "absolute ease" and "sultry sass" who does not "miss a beat". Senior music writer George Palathingal for The Sydney Morning Herald noted, "whether performing slick routines alongside two booty-shaking dancers or accompanied only by an acoustic guitarist, Mya is all class." Sheldon Ang of Sheldon Ang Media commented, "Mya's live act is compelling, with a dose of sexiness, bounce and elasticity – ultimately oozing a sultry zest – yet, classy with the respectable je ne sais quoi that only a few could pull off."

=== Influences ===
Mýa's musical influences include Sade, Janet Jackson, Michael Jackson, Stevie Wonder, Aretha Franklin, Prince, Chaka Khan, Minnie Riperton, and Madonna. Mýa praises Stevie Wonder for his ability to hear music and play music and feel it and get other people to feel it, and Madonna for her boldness and courage. Mýa calls Minnie Riperton her favorite female singer and Prince her musical hero, stating, "He's someone who takes risks. He's an all-around entertainer, hell of a performer. He's a genius."

Mýa's dance influences include Gregory Hines, Michael Jackson, Janet Jackson, Savion Glover, Jimmy Slyde, Electric Boogaloos, Rock Steady Crew, Cyd Charisse, Gene Kelly, Fred Astaire and Sammy Davis Jr.

She cites Lena Horne and Liza Minnelli as her role models.

=== Alter ego ===
Introduced to audiences through her song, "Worth It", Mýa credits notorious mob accountant Meyer Lansky for American Mafia, as inspiration for her new alias.

For Lan$ky's blunt cadence, Mýa cites hip-hop artists such as Mos Def, Common, Digable Planets, Black Thought, André 3000, and Erykah Badu.

Lan$ky is an integral part of Mýa, relying on her specifically during hard times. "When I need a picker-upper, or somebody to be that mentor, someone to be that fighter, or somebody to be that person that will crack the whip and get me in shape, that's who Mýa Lan$ky is."

== Other ventures ==
In 2008, Mýa founded her own independent record label and company Planet 9. Following the mishap of events for her last major studio album, she parted ways with the major label system. At the advice and guidance of her mentor J. Prince, the singer established and developed her own independent label with a new business approach in mind to create and release music. Although initially set-up as a record label and had release several independent projects/recordings, under the Planet 9 moniker, Mýa expanded the company's brand and ventured into winery, apparel, and production as well. Released in 2016, Mýa manufactured Planet 9 Fine Wine, a Cabernet Sauvignon organic vegan wine with plum infusions produced in partnership with Frey Vineyards.

=== Endorsements and brand partnerships ===
Throughout her career, Mýa has been involved in various brand partnerships with companies such as Coca-Cola, Pantene, Escada, Motorola, Microsoft, Dell, Apple Music, Verizon, Macy's, CoverGirl, Chevrolet, IMG, Heatherette, Kohl's, Electronic Arts, Meta, and more. (Note: Cited to multiple sources:) At the age of 18, Mýa served as an ad print spokeswoman for Bongo Jeans and had a Tommy Hilfiger lipstick shade named after her. In Fall 2000, she became a spokesperson for Iceberg jeans and featured in print ads in magazines. Mýa signed an endorsement deal with Coca-Cola in 2002, which included appearances on television commercials. She and then-label mate Common recorded a cover version of Ed Harris' "Real Compared To What". The commercial made its debut in 2003 at the American Music Awards and featured Mýa in a 90-second commercial singing a cover version of the song with Common. In early 2003, Mýa recorded a version of the Simon & Garfunkel hit "Feeling Groovy" for GAP television ads. The music for the spot was produced by Jimmy Jam & Terry Lewis. In late 2003, Mýa performed the original theme song, "Everything or Nothing", for the then-latest video game in the Bond franchise – 007: Everything or Nothing. Mýa also appears in the game as the NSA agent "Mya Starling". Mýa cowrote and coproduced the song with Randy Bugnitz and A&M president Ron Fair, and three variations of the theme appeared in the game. In 2005, Motorola signed Mya and eight other artists to appear in a television commercial promoting its first iPod music phone, the Motorola rokr. Additionally in 2005, Mýa signed to Ford Modeling agency and appeared in a variety of ad campaigns. On March 1, 2010, Escada announced that Mýa would host the celebration to introduce their newest scent.

=== Licensing ===
Mýa has secured high-profile sync and licensing placements with major media outlets such as NBC Universal, Bravo, Ford, Lifetime, HBO, CBS, Paramount, FOX, and others. (Note: Cited to multiple sources:)

== Personal life ==
=== Health and wellness ===
Mýa is a vegan (previously a vegetarian and pescatarian) and has promoted the vegan lifestyle on PETA's behalf. Her lifestyle includes a cruelty-free diet and the use of natural beauty products.

In an interview with Essence, Mýa discussed in-depth her beauty tips. Following the launch of her music career, she shared she eliminated processed foods and sodas from her diet. In addition, she touched on mental health and commented she writes and keeps a diary or journal with her on the road to keep track of her feelings which uses to keep her sane as well as prayer. When it comes to stage performances, photo shoot, and music videos, the singer noted she uses vegan cruelty free cosmetic products.

=== Marriage and family ===
Since 2013, Mýa has been married to herself. On her decision to marry herself, she explained, "It was all about self-care, self-love and getting myself back after a toxic relationship." Further adding, "It's not about anything like 'all men are bad' or anything like that. It's really about becoming your best self and making sure that you're leveling up in all aspects of your life."

In an interview with Melyssa Ford's Hot & Bothered podcast, the singer expressed that she has never desired marriage or children. She explained, "It's not even my focus and it never has been." In addition, the singer acknowledged because she is an independent artist and away for work a majority of the time, she could not fully commit to her significant other. Nonetheless, she has stated that she is not opposed to ever feeling a desire for a family or potentially having one in the future.

=== Wealth ===
Mýa's mother, Theresa, has served as her accountant and managed the singer's finances since 1997. Mýa credits her mother as a key factor to maintaining her long-term financial stability: live below your means.

== Philanthropy ==
In 2005, Mýa created her own nonprofit organization, The Mya Arts & Tech Foundation, which is dedicated to "providing disadvantaged youth growth and opportunity through arts and technology education". In 2007, she was featured in Heatherette's Fashion Show for Lifeball in Vienna, Austria to fight against Global AIDS. Mýa has hosted fundraisers for Skool'd to aid homeless LGBT youth, while also advocating for gay rights by opening the Out 100 Awards. In 2009, she continued her philanthropic efforts by chairing the 2009 Operation Smile Event, participating in the literary project, If I'd Known Then: Women in Their 20s and 30s Write Letters to their Younger Selves, by Ellen Spraggins, and accepting an honoree award for her work with the NSAL. In 2010 she was a part of various PSA campaigns including, Cyndi Lauper's True Colors: Give A Damn, NOH8 , and NSAL 2010. Most recently, Mýa collaborated with singer Dionne Warwick on the gospel song "Let There Be Light". It featured a supergroup of Gladys Knight, Billy Ray Cyrus, Joe Don Rooney (Rascal Flatts), Kevin Sorbo, John Elefante (former lead singer of Kansas), Damon Elliott, The Sorbo Family, Yoni Gordon and Lucas Vidal. Released October 18, 2017, all of the song's proceeds were donated to non-profit organization Feeding America. In March 2022, Mýa became World Animal Protection's first U.S. celebrity ambassador.

== Legacy and influence ==
Vogue's Alex Frank listed Mýa as one of the key influences on the female R&B artists of the 2000s, including Tinashe, FKA twigs and Jhené Aiko, even though these three are more often compared to Aaliyah. Lewis Dene of BBC Music applauded Mýa's ability to continue to "shrewdly bridge the gap between pop/R&B and street-level hip hop." The Daily Beast's Stereo Williams recognized Mýa as a trailblazer for artists like Tinashe and Kehlani while concluding her legacy is one that warrants celebrating. Music website Idolator epitomized "Case of the Ex (Whatcha Gonna Do)" as "everything that was great about turn-of-the millennium R&B". Essence and The Washington Post identifies Mýa as a classic "triple threat", commenting, "now having acted in such films as Havana Nights and Chicago and proved, under Savion Glover's aegis, she's a formidable dancer." However, noted "Mya's strongest trump card, overall, is charisma, one that mixing sweet, innocent girl next door and feisty hip-hop princess down the block." Rolling Out's Nagashia Jackson salutes the singer as an "forward-thinking architect of contemporary R&B" and admires her abilities to continuously "blend traditional soul influences" in her music with "progressive electronic and hip-hop elements." Mýa has been credited as an influence or inspiration by Melissa Steel, Liz, Ari Lennox, Ray BLK, Natasha, D∆WN (dance), Normani, Jazzy Amra, Sir Babygirl, Princess Nokia, Harloe, Chloe Bailey, Victoria Monét, iLoveMakonnen, Child Actor, Dungeonesse, Vessel, and Kyla.

== Achievements ==
As of 2008, Mýa has sold over 7 million albums worldwide. In 2009, Billboard ranked Mýa at No. 97 on their list of Hot 100 Artists of the 2000s. Complex listed her at No. 33 on their list of Top 100 Hottest Female Singers of All Time. Mýa's breakthrough single "Case of the Ex (Whatcha Gonna Do)" was listed at No. 77 on Billboard's Top 100 Songs by Female Solo Artists (1955–2007). Her collaborative effort, "Lady Marmalade" was listed at No. 47 on VH1's 100 Greatest Songs of '00s list. In March 2025, Billboard listed Mýa on their Top 100 Women Artists of the 21st Century list.

Since Mýa's arrival to the music industry, she has received numerous accolades, recognition(s), and honors throughout her career. In 2002, Mýa won a Grammy for Best Pop Collaboration with Vocals for "Lady Marmalade". Mýa won a Screen Actors Guild Award for her participation in Chicago. She is the winner of two MTV moonmen including the prestigious Video of the Year award for Lady Marmalade. In 2006, Mýa was honored at the Palm Beach International Film Festival with the Cross Over Award (from singer to actor). Her singles "The Best of Me Pt. II" and "Ghetto Supastar (That Is What You Are)" were featured on About.com's Top 50 R&B/Hip Hop Collaborations list at 40 and 44 respectively. In 2003 and 2004, she appeared on Maxim's Hot 100 list; ranking at 31 and 52 respectively. "Movin' On" was voted as one of The 50 Best R&B Videos of the 90s by Complex. Billboard ranked "Movin' On" tenth on their 20 Best High School Music Video list. Her performance of Lady Marmalade at the 44th Grammy Awards was featured on About.com's Top 10 Grammy Award Performances of All Time. In 2014, "Lady Marmalade" was featured on the Huffington Post's Top 10 Most Iconic Grammys Performances. In 2015, MTV voted Lady Marmalade at No. 1 as the Best Musical Performance in MTV Movie Award history. Mýa was featured on the Huffington Post's Top 26 Black Female Choreographer and Dancers list. Out magazine included "Case of the Ex" as one of their most empowering, memorable and influential all-girl dance routines. Most recently, her eight independent project, Smoove Jones received a grammy nomination for Best R&B Album for the 59th Annual Grammy Awards. Billboard listed "Lady Marmalade" on their 100 Greatest Award Show Performances of All Time list.

== Discography ==
Studio albums

- Mya (1998)
- Fear of Flying (2000)
- Moodring (2003)
- Liberation (2007)
- Sugar & Spice (2008)
- K.I.S.S. (Keep It Sexy & Simple) (2011)
- Smoove Jones (2016)
- T.K.O. (The Knock Out) (2018)
- Retrospect (2026)

== Tours ==
Headlining

- Fear of Flying Tour (2001)
- Moodring Tour (2003)
- Smoove Jones Show Tour (2016)
- T.K.O. Tour (2018)
- Retrospect Tour (2027)

Co-headlining

- Seagrams Live Tour (with Clipse) (2007)
- 3 R&B Superstars: Live in Concert (with 112 and Blackstreet) (2016)

Opening act

- Evolution Tour (for Boyz II Men) (1998)
- Full Frequency Tour (for Sean Paul) (2014)

Featured act

- Smokin' Groove Tour (1998)
- Lilith Fair (1999)
- All That! Music and More Festival (2000)
- BET Black College Tour (2007)
- RNB Fridays Live (2016)
- Femme It Forward (2019)
- KISSTORY Presents...The Blast Off! Tour (2020)
- Juicy Fest (2023)
- Queens of R&B Tour (2024)
- The Boy Is Mine Tour (2025)

== Filmography ==
Films starred

- In Too Deep (1999)
- Chicago (2002)
- Volcano High (2003)
- Dirty Dancing: Havana Nights (2004)
- Shall We Dance? (2004)
- Cursed (2005)
- The Metrosexual (2007)
- Cover (2008)
- Love For Sale (2008)
- Bottleworld (2009)
- The Penthouse (2010)
- The Heart Specialist (2006)
- Bermuda Tentacles (2014)
- Lazarus (2021)
- My Favorite Christmas Melody (2021)
- House Party (2023)

== See also ==
- List of artists who reached number one in the United States
- List of artists who reached number one on the Australian singles chart

== Notes ==
Awards and achievements
Preceded by Gilles Marini & Cheryl Burke	Dancing with the Stars (US) runner up Season 9 (Fall 2009 with Dmitry Chaplin)	Succeeded by Evan Lysacek & Anna Trebunskaya
