= Ready for Whatever (Mya song) =

2017 single by Mýa

Single by Mya

from the album T.K.O. (The Knock Out)
- Released: September 22, 2017
- Genre: R&B; trap
- Length: 3:22
- Label: Planet 9; MGM
- Songwriters: Mya Harrison; Kevin McCall; Lamar "MyGuyMars" Edwards
- Producers: MyGuyMars; Khirye Tyler

Mya singles chronology
"Coolin'" (2017)	"Ready for Whatever" (2017)	"You Got Me" (2017)

Music video
- "Ready for Whatever" on YouTube

"Ready for Whatever" is a song recorded by American singer Mya. It was written and composed by Kevin McCall, Mya, and Lamar "MyGuyMars" Edwards while production duties was helmed by the latter with additional contribution from Khirye Tyler. A seductive midtempo song, "Ready for Whatever" serves as the lead single from her eighth studio album T.K.O. (The Knock Out) (2018) and as a intimate request from an unsatisfied lover to her man to make her a priority in his life and refuses to let anyone or anything get in the way of her love. Musically, "Ready for Whatever" is built around tinkling synths, breathy coos and a thick synth bass line which automatically sets the mood to be tantalized and teased. "Ready for Whatever" was released September 22, 2017 on all digital platforms. A music video shot and directed by Mýa features her dancing in blue and purple haze lighting, modeling in a sports car, and hanging out at a skating rink co-starring Kevin McCall as her love interest.

== Background ==
On February 14, 2016, Mýa released her seventh studio album Smoove Jones (2016) to commemorate the release of her debut single "It's All About Me" and eighteenth anniversary in the entertainment industry. The release paid homage to R&B/soul/hip-hop with old school elements from the 1970s, 1980s, and 1990s and was released exclusively through Apple Music. Critically, Smoove Jones received "generally favourable" reviews from music critics. In 2017, Smoove Jones received a nomination for Best R&B Album at the 59th Annual Grammy Awards, which were held on February 12, 2017. Two days later, as a gift to her fans and commemorating her nineteenth anniversary, Mýa released a music video for the fan favorite "Coolin'". Filmed in Sydney, Australia, director Matt Sharp captures the singer's unmistakable beauty while she lets her vocals do the rest on a sandy beach.

== Release ==
In early September 2017, Mýa previewed the song and its video on her official Instagram account."Ready for Whatever" was officially released on September 22, 2017.

== Music video ==
=== Background and synopsis ===
In early September 2017, Mýa previewed the "Ready for Whatever" music video on her Instagram account. As a gift to her fans and in honor of her birthday, Mýa officially released the music video on October 10, 2017. In the dimly-lit, slinky, visual clip, directed and produced by herself and Dana Rice, Mýa slithers around in a haze of blue and purple light, posing in a luxury sports car and rolling around at a skating rink while donning a skin-revealing outfit and showing off her sexually charged dance moves which included grindin' on her love interest played by R&B singer Kevin McCall.

== Personnel ==
Credits adapted from Qobuz.

- Mýa – vocals, songwriting
- Kevin McCall – songwriting
- Lamar "Mars" Edwards – composer
- Khirye Tyler – composer

== Part II ==
"Ready, Part II"

Song by Mya

from the album T.K.O. (The Knock Out)
- Released: November 24, 2017
- Genre: R&B; soul
- Length: 3:57
- Label: Planet 9; MGM
- Songwriters: Mya Harrison; Shaunise "Niecy" Harris; Sydnii Raymore; R. Kelly
- Producers: MyGuyMars; Khirye Tyler; R. Kelly

Approximately two months later, a new mix featuring new vocals and arrangements from Mýa was released. Titled "Ready, Part II Bedroom Mix," it was distinctively different from the original, musically and lyrically. "Ready, Part II" was written by Shaunise "Niecy" Harris, Sydnii Raymore, Mýa and R.Kelly. While production was helmed by the latter, Lamar "Mars" Edwards and Khirye Tyler. Described as a sensual, slow burner, "Ready, Part II" was inspired by and utilized R.Kelly's It Seems Like You're Ready (1993) as its musical foundation. Chosen as the second single from her eighth studio album T.K.O., "Ready, Part II" was released November 24, 2017 on all digital platforms.

=== Personnel ===
- Mýa – vocals, songwriting
- Shaunise "Niecy" Harris – songwriting
- Sydnii Raymore – songwriting
- R.Kelly – songwriting, composer
- Lamar "Mars" Edwards – composer
- Khirye Tyler – composer

== Release history ==
=== Part I ===
Region	Date	Format	Label	Ref.
Various	September 22, 2017	Digital download; streaming	Planet 9; Ingrooves	

=== Part II ===
Region	Date	Format	Label	Ref.
Various	November 24, 2017	Digital download; streaming	Planet 9; Ingrooves	
