= It Seems Like You're Ready =

Song by R. Kelly

from the album 12 Play
- Released: December 9, 1993
- Genre: R&B
- Length: 5:39
- Label: Jive
- Songwriter: R. Kelly
- Producer: R. Kelly

"It Seems Like You're Ready" is a downtempo R&B track by singer, songwriter, and producer R. Kelly. It is the fourth track on his debut solo studio album, 12 Play. It Seems Like You're Ready charted at #59 on the Billboard airplay chart, #29 on the Rhythmic Top 40 charts, and #29 on the Hot R&B/Hip Hop Songs charts.

== Charts ==
Chart	Position
US Billboard Hot 100 Airplay	59
US Hot R&B/Hip-Hop Songs (Billboard)	29
US Rhythmic Airplay (Billboard)	29

== Later samples ==
- "I Should Be..." by Dru Hill from the album Dru World Order (2002)
- "Ridin in My Chevy" by Ghetto Mafia from the album Da Return of Ghetto Mafia (2005)
- "Temperature's Rising" by Doughbeezy from the album No Money, No Conversation EP (2011)
- "Ladies Lullaby" by Chalie Boy featuring Fat Pimp from the album Baby Makin Music: The R&B Files (2011)
- "Seems Like You Ready" by Jae Millz featuring Corte Ellis from the album The Virgo Part 4: How Nasty Can He Get (2012)
- "Songs on 12 Play" by Chris Brown featuring Trey Songz from the album X (2014)
- "Start a Fire" by Lil Wayne featuring Christina Milian from the album Tha Carter V (2014)

== Covers ==
- Singer Colton Ford has covered this song on his album Under the Covers. (2009)
