= List of Mya live performances =

Mya live performances
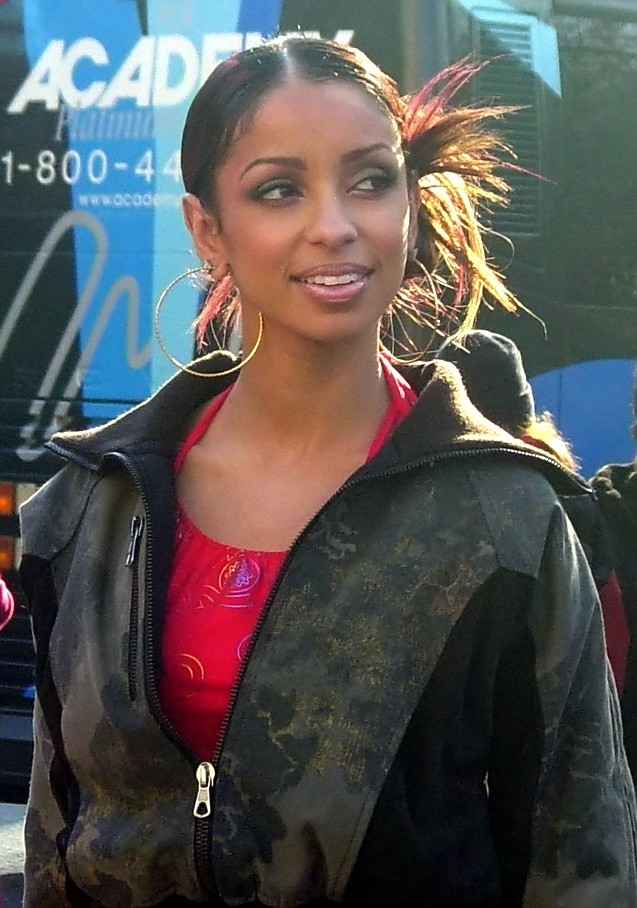
- Mya at the 2003 Macy's Thanksgiving Day Parade in New York City
- ↙Concert tours: 3
- ↙Tribute Performances: 2
- ↙Award shows performances: 10
- ↙Performances at television shows and specials: 43

American recording artist Mya has embarked three headlining concert tours. Before headlining her own tours, in the beginning stages of her career Mya spent three years touring festivals and opening for other artists. Her first headlining concert tour, dubbed the Fear of Flying Tour debuted in 2001. Launched in support of her second studio album, Fear of Flying (2000), Mya embarked on a nine-day nationwide concert tour. A relatively short tour based predominately in smaller venues, it debuted March 21, 2001 and received mixed reviews. Following the release of her third studio album, Moodring (2003), Mya embarked on her second concert tour – The Moodring Tour. A 24-day nationwide tour, it visited venues across United States. An intimate affair, beginning October 11, 2003, the tour received mixed reviews by music journalism. In 2016, Mya embarked on her third concert tour entitled, The Smoove Jones Show Tour. Her most extensive trek, the tour visited North America, Australia, New Zealand and Middle East. Lauded by music journalism, the singer's performances received rave reviews most notably for her vocals, stage presence and showmanship.

Throughout her career, Mya performed at corporate events, benefits concerts, tribute performances, and televised award performances and concert specials most notably; mtvIcon:Janet Jackson, 2001 MTV Movie Awards, Michael Jackson: 30th Anniversary Celebration, United We Stand: What More Can I Give, 44th Annual Grammy Awards, and Lifetime's Women Rock!.

== Tours ==
Year	Title	Duration	Number of performances
2001	Fear of Flying Tour	March 21, 2001 – April 9, 2001 (North America)	9
The Fear of Flying Tour was Mya debut solo concert tour. Her first headlining tour, it was launched in support of her second album, Fear of Flying (2000). A relatively short tour, Mya embarked on a nine-day nationwide concert tour across North America. The trek, beginning March 21, 2001, set list mainly drew from her second album, Fear of Flying as well as included songs from her eponymous debut album Mya (1998) and concluded April 1, 2001. Her show at the House of Blues in Los Angeles was featured on House of Blues Online Web cast on April 17 and April 26. Beginning, April 17, 2001 at 12 p.m. PDT online viewers had the opportunity to stream the 24-hour video Web cast performance via hob.com.
2003	Moodring Tour	October 11, 2003 – November 10, 2003 (North America)	24
The Moodring Tour was the second concert tour by American recording artist Mya. Visiting venues across North America, the tour accompanied her third studio album, Moodring (2003). A 24-day nationwide outing, the tour commenced on October 11, 2003 and concluded on November 10, 2003. It featured then up and coming R&B singer Javier Colon and Swedish DJ duo Snook as the tour's opening acts. An intimate affair, the tour received mixed reviews.
2016	Smoove Jones Show Tour	February 27, 2016 – December 31, 2016 (North America, Africa, Oceania, Middle East)	68
The Smoove Jones Show was the third concert tour by American recording artist Mya. Visiting North America, Africa, Australia, New Zealand, and Middle East, the tour accompanied the singer's seventh studio album, Smoove Jones (2016). Her most extensive trek, the tour consisted of 3 legs with 45 shows in North America, 21 shows in Oceania, and 1 show in Middle East. Beginning, February 27, 2016, the tour and the singer's performances received rave reviews with particularly her vocals and showmanship being highlighted. Following 68 shows, the tour concluded on December 31, 2016.

== Concert and festival performances ==
Date	Event	Location(s)	Ref.
October 29, 1998	B96 Halloween Bash	Chicago, Illinois	
July 2–9, 2000^{[A]}	All That! Music and More Festival	Southern California	
October 31, 2000	94.5 Monster Jam	Boston, Massachusetts	
December 14, 2000	Z100 Jingle Ball	New York City	
February 25, 2001	Y100's Volleypalooza	South Beach, Florida	
May 4, 2001	SunFest	West Palm Beach, Florida	
June 17, 2001	Wango Tango	Los Angeles, California	
June 11, 2011	Los Angeles Pride	West Hollywood, California	
July 21–23, 2011	Reggae Sumfest	Montego Bay, Jamaica	
June 8, 2013	Indy Pride	Indianapolis, Indiana	
June 22, 2014	Chicago Pride Parade	Chicago, Illinois	
June 21, 2015	Denver Pride	Denver, Colorado	
June 27, 2015	Nashville Pride	Nashville Tennessee	
September 18–25, 2016	RNB Fridays Live	Australia	
February 18, 2017	Soulquarius:An R&B Jam	Santa Ana, California	
June 18, 2018	Chicago Pride Parade	Chicago, Illinois	
June 30, 2018	Oh My! Music Festival	Amsterdam, Netherlands	
February 22, 2019	The Real Music Fest	Lexington, Kentucky	
May 25, 2019	Birmingham Pride	Birmingham, England	
June 23, 2019	Pride Toronto	Toronto, Canada	
November 6, 2021	Phoenix Pride	Phoenix, Arizona	
May 14–15, 2022	Usher's Lovers & Friends	Las Vegas, Nevada	
June 11, 2022^{[B]}	Los Angeles Pride	West Hollywood, California	
June 26, 2022	Baltimore Pride	Baltimore, Maryland	
July 29, 2022	Pittsburgh Black Pride	Pittsburgh, Pennsylvania	
September 17, 2022	Meadowview Music Fest	Sacramento, California	
October 8–9, 2022	ONE Music Fest	Atlanta, Georgia	
January 5–15, 2023	Juicy Fest	New Zealand; Australia	
July 14, 2023	Rock the Park	London, Ontario	
August 6, 2023	Long Beach Pride	Long Beach, California	
August 11, 2023	Fierté Montréal	Montreal	
August 19, 2023	Old but Gold Festival	Hamburg, Germany	
September 16, 2023	Frizz Fest	St Louis, Missouri	
September 23, 2023	AIDS Walk Atlanta Music Festival and 5K Run	Atlanta, Georgia	

== Tribute performances ==
Date	Event	Tribute Artist	Performed song(s)	Ref.
March 13, 2001	mtvICON	Janet Jackson	"Miss You Much"; "Alright"; "If; "The Pleasure Principle"; "Rhythm Nation"; (dance medley with Usher and Pink)	
September 7–10, 2001	Michael Jackson: 30th Anniversary Celebration	Michael Jackson	"Wanna Be Startin' Somethin'"; "Heal the World"; (with Usher, Whitney Houston, Tamia, Deborah Cox, Monica, and Rah Digga)	

== Benefit performances ==
Date	Event	Location	Performed song(s)	Ref.
April 17, 1999	Wyclef Jean's Haitian Benefit Concert	Miami	"Movin' On"	
May 6, 2000	Revlon Run/Walk For Women	New York City	"Lean On Me"	
July 3, 2000	NYC 2000 Salutes the American Hero	New York City	"Ghetto Supastar (That Is What You Are)"; "Movin' On"; "Best of Me, Part 2"; "Take Me There"; "Ride & Shake"; "Case of the Ex"	
November 21, 2000	LIFEBeat present Music with a Message: World AIDS Day 2000	New York City	"Case of the Ex"	
October 21, 2001	United We Stand: What More Can I Give	Washington D.C.	"What More Can I Give"	
October 23, 2003	Lifetime's Women Rock!	Hollywood	"Stormy Weather"; "Stayin' Alive"; (with Mandy Moore, Anastacia, and Ann Wilson)	

== Live performances ==
=== Award shows ===
Date	Event	City	Performed song(s)	Ref.
September 10, 1998	1998 MTV Video Music Awards	Los Angeles	"Ghetto Supastar (That Is What You Are)" (with Pras and Ol' Dirty Bastard)	
October 15, 1998	1998 MOBO Awards	South Kensington	"Ghetto Supastar (That Is What You Are)" (with Pras)	
February 14, 1999	1999 NAACP Image Awards	Pasadena	"One Voice" (with The Children of the World Choir)	
May 29, 2000	2000 World Music Awards	Monte Carlo	"The Best of Me"	
February 28, 2001	2001 Soul Train Music Awards	Los Angeles	"Case of the Ex"; "Free"	
June 2, 2001	2001 MTV Movie Awards	Los Angeles	"Lady Marmalade" (with Christina Aguilera, Pink, and Lil' Kim)	
February 27, 2002	2002 Grammy Awards	Los Angeles	"Lady Marmalade" (with Christina Aguilera, Pink, Lil' Kim, and Patti LaBelle)	
May 18, 2002	2002 ALMA Awards	Los Angeles	"Siempre" (with La Ley)	
October 21, 2003	2003 GQ Men of the Year Awards	Los Angeles	"Fallen"; "My Love Is Like...Wo"	
March 16, 2005	TV Land Awards	Santa Monica	"Last Dance"	
June 9, 2025	2025 BET Awards	Los Angeles	"Case of the Ex"	

=== Broadcast shows and specials ===
Date	Event	Country	Performed song(s)	Ref.
1998	Teen Summit	United States	"It's All About Me"	
1998	Vibe	United States	"It's All About Me" (with Sisqo)	
1998	Motown Live	United States	"Movin' On"	
July 17, 1998	Top of the Pops	United Kingdom	"Ghetto Supastar (That Is What You Are)" (with Pras)	
July 24, 1998	Top of the Pops	United Kingdom	"Ghetto Supastar (That Is What You Are)"(with Pras)	
July 31, 1998	Top of the Pops	United Kingdom	"Ghetto Supastar (That Is What You Are)"(with Pras)	
January 30, 1999	All That	United States	"Take Me There" (with Blackstreet)	
March 6, 1999	Soul Train	United States	"My First Night with You"	
1999	Motown Live	United States	"My First Night with You"	
May 17, 2000	MTV's House of Style	United States	"The Best of Me"(with Jadakiss)	
July 10, 2000	Farmclub.com	United States	"Case of the Ex"	
September 18, 2000	106 & Park	United States	"Case of the Ex"	
October 23, 2000	Total Request Live	United States	"Case of the Ex"	
November 6, 2000	The Tonight Show with Jay Leno	United States	"Case of the Ex"	
November 11, 2000	Soul Train	United States	"Case of the Ex"; "Free"	
December 7, 2000	MTV's Fashionably Loud	United States	"Case of the Ex"; "Free"	
December 15, 2000	The Queen Latifah Show	United States	"Case of the Ex"	
January 27, 2001	Live & Kicking	United Kingdom	"Case of the Ex"	
February 9, 2001	Top of the Pops	United Kingdom	"Case of the Ex"	
February 20, 2001	The Rosie O'Donnell Show	United States	"Free"	
April 17, 2001	The Queen Latifah Show	United States	"Free"	
June 15, 2001	Live with Regis & Kelly	United States	"Where the Dream Takes You"	
July 10, 2001	2001 Major League Baseball All-Star Game	United States	"The Star-Spangled Banner"	
August 21, 2001	An American Celebration at Ford's Theatre	United States	"Where the Dream Takes You"	
December 21, 2001	MTV's Music in High Places	Italy	"The Best of Me"; "Best of Me, Part 2"; "Movin' On"; "Fear of Flying"; "Case of the Ex"; "I'll Be There"; "Sweet Thing"; "My First Night with You"; "Ghetto Supastar (That Is What You Are)"; "Free"	
March 4, 2002	The Wayne Brady Show	United States	"Ain't No Mountain High Enough"; "You're All I Need to Get By"; "Ain't Nothing Like The Real Thing"	
January 16, 2003	The Disco Ball...A 30 Year Celebration	United States	"Turn The Beat Around"; "Last Dance"; (with Whoopi Goldberg, Thelma Houston, Taylor Dayne, and Gloria Gaynor)	
May 27, 2003	MTV Beach House	United States	"My Love Is Like...Wo"	
July 13, 2003	MTV's Carson Daly Bash	United States	"My Love Is Like...Wo"	
July 22, 2003	Live with Regis & Kelly	United States	"My Love Is Like...Wo"	
July 24, 2003	Passions	United States	"My Love Is Like...Wo"	
July 25, 2003	106 & Park	United States	"My Love Is Like...Wo"	
August 6, 2003	Pepsi Smash	United States	"My Love Is Like...Wo"; "Whatever Bitch"; "Sophisticated Lady"	
September 13, 2003	Mad TV	United States	"My Love Is Like...Wo"; "Whatever Bitch"	
October 17, 2003	The Ellen DeGeneres Show	United States	"Fallen"	
November 27, 2003	Macy's Thanksgiving Day Parade	United States	"Fallen"	
December 23, 2003	A Home For the Holidays	United States	"Fallen"	
March 5, 2004	The Tonight Show with Jay Leno	United States	"Everything or Nothing"	
March 26, 2005	Showtime at the Apollo	United States	"Sugar Daddy" (with Cuban Link)	
May 8, 2005	Soul Train	United States	"Sugar Daddy" (with Cuban Link)	
September 3, 2006	2006 Sony HD 500	United States	The Star-Spangled Banner	
July 15, 2007	2007 WNBA All-Star Game Halftime Show	United States	"Walka Not A Talka"; "Case of the Ex"; "Ghetto Supastar (That Is What You Are)"; "Free"; "Still A Woman"	
July 24, 2012	Sunrise	Australia	"Case of the Ex"; "Lady Marmalade"; "Love Is the Answer"	
November 20, 2016	The Loop	Australia	"Movin' On"; "Case of the Ex"	
February 22, 2017	Hollywood Today Live	United States	"Unbreakable"; "Superwoman"	

== See also ==
- Mya discography
- Mya filmography
- Mya videography
- List of songs recorded by Mya

== Notes ==
^{A} Mya performed on the Southern California leg dates.
^{B} Mya reunited and performed "Lady Marmalade" and "Let There Be Love" with Christina Aguilera.
