= Seagrams Live Tour =

2007 concert tour by Mýa and Clipse

Seagram's Live
- Tour by Mýa and Clipse
- Promotional flyer for the tour
- Start date: April 7, 2007
- End date: April 29, 2007
- Legs: 1
- No. of shows: 11 in North America
Mýa chronology
Moodring Tour (2003)	Seagram's Live (2007)	Full Frequency Tour (2014)
Clipse chronology
Seagram's Live (2007)	Hell Hath No Fury Tour (2007)

The eighth annual Seagram's Live (also known as the Seagram's Gin Live Tour) was a co-headlining concert tour by American recording artists Mýa and Clipse. The short club tour ran for 11 shows in North America, in April 2007.

== Background ==
Following a near four year hiatus, several online publications reported Mya signed on to co-headline the eighth annual Seagram's Gin Live Tour, a signature urban music showcase event to promote her fourth studio album Liberation (2007). Although the singer doesn't drink anymore and during a brief interview when asked why she's on the tour, she laughed and responded, "I want to promote my new album. I love to perform, to dance, to sing...I love to be out on the road, have to be out on the road, taking in that scenery...The gin is just a bonus if I want it." A concert package, the outing included co-headliners rappers Clipse and up and coming soul singer Jovan Dais touring hot night spots in 11 cities. Opting to play clubs instead of larger venues, the tour was described to be "more intimate" in the singer's own words. She expounded on the subject and explained, "Stadium don't come until you have about four singles or albums, some sponsors." For Mya, this tour was a way to reintroduce herself into the marketplace.

== Opening act ==
- Jovan Dais

== Setlist ==
The following setlists were obtained from the concert held on April 21, 2007, at 9:30 Club in Washington, D.C. It does not represent all concerts for the duration of the tour.

Clipse set

1. "Hello New World"
2. "Virginia"
3. "Keys Open Doors"
4. "Nightmares"
5. "Ma, I Don't Love Her"
6. "We Got It For Cheap"
7. "What Happened to That Boy"
8. "Mr. Me Too"
9. "Cot Damn"
10. "Ride Around Shining"
11. "Trill"
12. "When the Last Time"
13. "Wamp Wamp (What It Do)"
14. "Grindin'"

Mýa set

1. "Case of the Ex"
2. "Lock U Down"
3. "Fallen"
4. "Free"
5. "Ridin'"
6. "The Best of Me"
7. "Real Compared to What"
8. "I Am"
9. "Walka Not a Talka"
10. "It's All About Me"
11. "Ayo!"
12. "My Love Is Like...Wo"

== Tour dates ==
Date	City	Country	Venue
North America
April 7, 2007	Memphis	United States	Plush Club
April 8, 2007	New Orleans	United States	House of Blues
April 12, 2007	Atlanta	United States	Sugar Hill
April 13, 2007	Birmingham	United States	Platinum
April 14, 2007	Jackson	United States	Freelons Da Groove
April 20, 2007	Detroit	United States	Visions
April 21, 2007	Washington, D.C.	United States	9:30 Club
April 26, 2007	New York City	United States	B.B. King Blues Club
April 27, 2007	Fort Bragg	United States	Sports USA
April 28, 2007	Tampa	United States	Club Skye
April 29, 2007 (Note: Monica made a special appearance.)	Miami	United States	The Fifth
