= Sugar & Spice (Mya album) =

Studio album by Mya
- Released: December 3, 2008
- Recorded: September–November 2008
- Genres: R&B; dance-pop
- Length: 55:58
- Labels: Manhattan; Planet 9
- Producers: D. Botts; Mike "Trauma" D.; Michael Duque; Riddim Fingaz; Loren Hill; Stevie Hoang; Jimmy Juarez; KO Tha Trakaholik; Rich Shelton; The Smith Brothers; Kevin Veny; Duke Williams; Leroy Williams; Yonny

Mya chronology
Liberation (2007)	Sugar & Spice (2008)	Beauty & the Streets Vol. 1 (2009)

Singles from Sugar & Spice
- 1. "Paradise" Released: October 31, 2008

Sugar & Spice is the fifth studio album by American singer Mya. It was released by Manhattan Recordings exclusively in Japan on December 3, 2008. The album was produced through Mya's own independent label imprint Planet 9 following her departure from Universal Motown amid the leakage of her previous album Liberation in the Japanese music market. Rather than spending time in court suing Motown/Universal, she opted out of her contract. Mya was then approached to record more albums exclusively for the Japanese market because of the positive response Liberation received.

Recorded between the months of September and November 2008 at Mya's own recording studio, production was primary handled by a variety of low-profile producers; enlisting the help of Arkatech Beatz, Riddim Fingaz, The Smith Bros, and Duke Williams among others. Harrison, took full creative control co-writing the entire album with producer Christopher Moore and served as executive producer. Guest features included rappers Tre, Faith Boogie, and dancehall musician Sean Paul. In her own words, Mya described the album as "a compilation with all positive energy and song content."

The album spawned just one single, the riddim-inspired "Paradise", which was released on October 31, 2008. Sugar & Spice debuted at number fifty-three on Japan's Oricon Albums Chart.

== Background ==
In 2007, the singer's fourth studio album Liberation was accidentally released in Japan when the release date changed. At the time, she was signed to Universal Motown and her lawyer advised the singer to not waste time and money taking the issue to court, so Harrison decided to go independent instead. The Liberation album became so popular in Japan that indie label Manhattan Recordings approached her about doing business with them. Harrison then released her first independent project, Sugar & Spice, a year after her split with Motown in Japan in 2008.

=== Planet 9 ===
In 2008, Harrison created her own label imprint Planet 9. Since parting ways with Universal Motown, Harrison has released four independently self-funded, self-executive produced projects; 2008's Sugar & Spice, 2009's Sugar & Spice: The Perfect Edition, 2010's Beauty & the Streets Vol. 1 and 2011's K.I.S.S. In 2009, Harrison spoke with Rolling Out magazine, elaborating more on her hiatus from music and decision to go independent:

"I've never stopped doing music. I've created a label called Planet 9 and I released an album in Japan. I invested in my own studio and it cut the recording cost down 95 percent. I have my own in-house producers and they are not as expensive as an established producer. The return is greater and now I own my masters. I see six dollars per album sold versus 10 cents. You may not sell as many units because you don't put as much money in promotions, but the returns are better."

Later in the interview, the singer voiced her opinion on the differences between major record labels and independent labels, sharing with "Major labels have a system that you have to go through. The people in power dictate how things should sound and where the money is spent. But when you become your own boss, you check every line item and you have to be cautious."

== Development ==
Unlike her first four studio albums, which were financed by major record labels, Sugar & Spice was solely self-funded and self-produced in Mya's home studio in her hometown of Washington D.C. After signing an exclusive recording contract with Manhattan Recordings, Harrison began production for the album in September 2008. Unfamiliar with the independent route and to keep recording cost down as much as possible, Harrison opted to work with a variety of less known producers to create Sugar & Spice. In search of new producers, while at a Guitar Center in Los Angeles buying equipment Mya met reggae producer Chris "Riddim Fingaz" Garvey's brother and got his phone number. Aware of his great production skills, Mya reluctantly called him, collaborated and produced "Paradise", a riddim-inspired song. Of his contribution to Sugar & Spice, Harrison commented, "Riddim Fingaz has a great presence and is a great talent."

Continuing production on Sugar & Spice, Harrison reached out to Yonni, a young producer from Cleveland, Ohio with whom she met through MySpace. Prior to the leakage of her fourth studio album Liberation, Yonni had produced a remix version of Harrison's single "Ridin'". Impressed with his production skills, Harrison and Yonni continued to work together and maintain a professional relationship. Additionally, Harrison sought out UK singer, songwriter and producer Stevie Hoang for contribution to Sugar & Spice as well. With 14 tracks in total, in an article commenting on the finished results, Sugar & Spice was described as a lineup of songs that stimulate the Japanese quintessence that set apart from her previous albums and dubbed musically as her most wonderful work to date.

== Music and composition ==
Musically, Sugar & Spice contains melodic songs based on the pop genre that compliments Mya's vocals. Commenting on the album's theme, Mya explained, "There's a saying, "A life with sugar (sweetness) and spices (stimulation) is wonderful." Girls need sugar and spices, while noting, "This album has a little bit of sugar and a little spice, so you can get to know the two sides of Mýa." Sugar & Spice opens with the '80s pop-inspired "Must Be the Music". It followed by the Riddim Fingaz-produced "Paradise". A riddim song, "Paradise" was chosen as the album's first single after a listening sessions with fans. Track six, the ballad "Cry No More", was described as a "very passionate" song, while mid-tempo "Ego Trippin'" addresses a situation in which Harrison admits that she was wrong. "Shy Guy", a cover of Diana King's hit served as the album's tenth track. When asked why she chose to cover the song, Harrison responded, "It was my favorite song when I was young. I was in reggae mode, so I wanted to add that kind of flavor, while pointing out, "It's a really fun song, it's a bit like sugar and spice." "Back to Disco" the album's twelfth track incorporates element of 70s music.

== Release and promotion ==
Following its completion, Sugar & Spice arrived in stores and online December 3, 2008. The following year Manhattan Recordings issued Sugar & Spice: The Perfect Edition, a double disc album that featured a new track, new remixes and past hits within her discography on August 5, 2009.

To promote Sugar & Spice, Manhattan Recordings organized and arranged an album release party at Fever, a popular night club/music venue where Harrison performed for the very first time in Japan. A 40 minute stage show that featured four costumes changes, Mya was accompanied by four dancers and performed new material from Sugar & Spice as well as her past hits which included, "Paradise", "Shy Guy", "Must Be the Music", "Fallen", and "The Best of Me".

=== Singles ===
Sugar & Spice spawned the first and only single, "Paradise". Written by Mya and songwriter Christopher Moore, "Paradise" is a riddim-inspired song produced by Riddim Fingaz. Played during a listening session, fans responded positively and thus "Paradise" was chosen as the lead single. Manhattan Recordings released "Paradise" on October 31, 2008. An accompanying music video followed and was directed by photographer Marc Baptiste.

== Track listing ==
Sugar & Spice – standard edition
No.	Title	Writer(s)	Producer(s)	Length
1.	"Must Be the Music"	Mya Harrison; Christopher Moore	Jimmy "Klev" Juarez	4:57
2.	"Paradise"	Harrison; Moore	Riddim Fingaz	3:25
3.	"Sold on Your Love"	Harrison; Moore	Stevie Hoang	4:32
4.	"One for You"	Harrison; Moore	Hoang	4:07
5.	"Almost Naked"	Nia Myricks; Pamela Shipp	Yonny	3:40
6.	"Cry No More"	Harrison; Moore	D. Botts	4:25
7.	"Ego Trippin'"	Harrison; Elizabeth Wyce	The Smith Brothers	4:08
8.	"Let's Go to War" (introducing Faith Boogie)	Harrison; Moore; Faith Waldron	Yonny; Harrison	3:06
9.	"All in Your Mind"	Harrison; Moore	Leroy "Mr. Lee" Williams	3:04
10.	"Shy Guy"	Harrison; Kingsley Gardner; Diana King; Andy Marvel	KO Tha Trakaholik; Duke Williams	4:05
11.	"Money Can't Buy My Love"	Harrison; Moore	Michael Duque	4:52
12.	"Back to Disco"	Harrison; Moore	Mike "Trauma" D.	4:29
13.	"Fallen (Part 2)" (featuring Tre; bonus track)	Harrison; Moore; Tre Hardson	Rich "Nieze" Shelton; Kevin Veny; Loren Hill	3:45
14.	"Paradise" (remix featuring Sean Paul; bonus track)	Harrison; Moore; Sean Paul Henriques	Riddim Fingaz	3:23
Total length:				55:58

Sugar & Spice – Perfect edition
No.	Title	Writer(s)	Producer(s)	Length
1.	"Wish You Were Here" (featuring Che'Nelle)	Harrison; Carnoy Watkins; Cheryline Lim; James Abrahart	KO Tha Trakaholik	3:59
2.	"Paradise" (Ryan Leslie Remix)	Harrison; Moore; Leslie	Riddim Fingaz; Leslie; Kaleb "Kquick" Rollins	3:39
3.	"Sold on Your Love"	Harrison; Moore	Hoang	4:10
4.	"One for You"	Harrison; Moore	Hoang	3:56
5.	"Almost Naked"	Nia Myricks; Pamela Shipp	Yonny	3:39
6.	"Cry No More"	Harrison; Moore	D. Botts	4:23
7.	"Ego Trippin'"	Harrison; Wyce	The Smith Brothers	4:06
8.	"Let's Go to War" (introducing Faith Boogie)	Harrison; Moore; Waldron	Yonny; Harrison	3:05
9.	"All in Your Mind"	Harrison; Moore	Williams	3:03
10.	"Shy Guy" (DJ Hasebe Remix)	Harrison; Gardner; King; Marvel; Andrew Saidenberg	KO Tha Trakaholik; Williams; DJ Hasebe	4:14
11.	"Money Can't Buy My Love"	Harrison; Moore	Duque	4:50
12.	"Back to Disco"	Harrison; Moore	Mike "Trauma" D.	4:28
13.	"Must Be the Music"	Harrison; Moore	Juarez	4:55
14.	"Lock U Down" (featuring Lil Wayne)	Harrison; Scott Storch; Dwayne Carter	Storch	3:34
15.	"Fallen" (remix featuring Fatlip and Tre)	Luiz Bonfá; Maria Toledo; Leonard "Hugg" Huggins; Richard Shelton; Loren Hill; Kevin Veney; Derrick Stewart; Trevant Hardson	Shelton; Hill; Veney; Fair^{[a]}	3:55
16.	"Fallen (Part 2)" (featuring Tre)	Harrison; Moore; Hardson		3:36
17.	"Ayo!" (featuring DJ Kool)	John Bowman, Jr.; Harrison; Chris Henderson; Charlie Smalls	Henderson	3:53
18.	"Girls Dem Sugar" (Beenie Man featuring Mya)	Moses Davis; Chad Hugo; Pharrell Williams	The Neptunes	4:19
19.	"Sugar Daddy" (Cuban Link featuring Mya)	Felix Delgado	Tiger	4:04
20.	"Paradise" (DJ Mayumi Remix)	Harrison; Moore; Leslie	Riddim Fingaz; DJ Mayumi	2:58
Total length:				78:46

Sugar & Spice – Perfect edition bonus disc
No.	Title	Writer(s)	Producer(s)	Length
1.	"My Perfect Mix"	Hosted by Mya	DJ Hasebe	59:38

== Personnel ==
Credits adapted from the liner notes of Sugar & Spice.

Visuals and imagery

- Art direction and design – Courtney Walter
- Hair stylist – Frederick Parnell
- Make-up – Aminata Gueye
- Photography – Marc Baptiste
- Stylist – Kithe Brewster

Technical and production

- Engineering – Mya Harrison
- Mastering – Mike Mo
- Mixing – Mike Mo

== Charts ==
Weekly chart performance
Chart (2008)	Peak position
Japan Top Albums Sales (Billboard Japan)	45
Japanese Albums (Oricon)	53

== Release history ==
Release dates and formats
Region	Date	Format(s)	Edition(s)	Label(s)	Ref.
Japan	December 3, 2008	Digital download; CD	Standard	Manhattan Recordings; Planet 9	
Japan	August 5, 2009	Digital download; CD	The Perfect Edition	Manhattan Recordings; Planet 9	
