= Moodring Tour =

2003 concert tour by Mýa

- Tour by Mýa
- Associated album: Moodring
- Start date: October 11, 2003
- End date: November 10, 2003
- Legs: 1
- No. of shows: 24 in North America
- Supporting acts: Javier

Mýa concert chronology
- Fear of Flying Tour (2001); Moodring Tour (2003); Seagrams Live Tour (2007)

The Moodring Tour was the second concert tour by American recording artist Mýa. Visiting venues across North America, the tour supported the singer's third studio album, Moodring (2003). A 24-day nationwide outing, the tour commenced on October 11, 2003 and concluded on November 10, 2003. It featured then up and coming R&B singer Javier Colon and Swedish DJ duo Snook as the tour's opening acts. An intimate affair, the tour received generally mixed to positive reviews.

== Background and development ==
By 2001, Harrison had amassed nine Top 10 hits and sold six million albums worldwide. After years of touring festivals and opening for other artists, she embarked on her first headlining concert tour the Fear of Flying Tour (2001). In July 2003, she released Moodring, her third studio album to favorable reviews from music critics and garnered her biggest first week sales yet. Less than two months after its release, Moodring was certified gold by the Recording Industry Association of America. Upon the album's release, the singer was set to join either R.Kelly or Mariah Carey's tours — or both — for "a few, maybe 10 dates" in the coming weeks, due to tour overseas in September, and originally one of the first featured names mentioned for the Verizon Ladies First Tour, however nothing ever materialized. Mya did however, opened for Brian McKnight on a few select dates in September. Along with those prior obligations, the singer planned ahead and began auditioning dancers and getting a band together for her own U.S. tour down the line — a House of Blues/small theater-sized trek which eventually resulted into the Moodring Tour.

== Concert synopsis ==
The concert in Atlantic City, the singer made her "casino debut" and performed a 55-minute set for her audience at Mixx, a dance club in Borgata Hotel Casino & Spa. Backed by a five-piece band (a drummer, a bassist, two keyboardists, and a guitarist) two backup singers, and six dancers to accompany her, she designed her show to spotlight songs from her first two albums Mya (1998) and Fear of Flying (2000) at the beginning and material from her third album Moodring a little later. During her performance, the singer's hair was long and braided, and she made only one costume change, going from black in the beginning to red and white by the middle of the concert.

The concert began on an appropriate upbeat note with one of her biggest hits, "Case of the Ex." Known as a dancer before she was a singer, Mya danced so hard early in the show that one of her big, gold earrings was missing by the third song. When it came time for Mya to start singing songs from Moodring, staff writer Vincent Jackson of The Press of Atlantic City opined,"the band did a good job recreating her heavily produced album sounds" and expressed admiration for her concert rendition of "Fallen" with the remark, "it showed how well she sings live, better than some of her entertainment contemporaries." Throughout the duration of her concert, Jackson took noticed of how the singer was "a little saucy" in keeping with the more sexual nature of her newer music. While performing "It's All About Me," the singer took the opportunity to pluck a guy from the audience and onto the stage, danced all around him, sat on his lap, and fed him strawberries covered in whip cream. She ended her show strongly with a funkier version of one of her earlier hits, "Free," than the recorded rendition. The concert concluded with "My Love Is Like...Wo," which veered into a reggae groove and what sounded like a hip hop remix before coming to a close.

== Critical reception ==
For the most part, the tour received generally mixed to positive reviews. In a positive review, Jami Gordillo-Kerby of The Fresno Bee revered the singer's concert at The Big Fresno Fair. A colorfully staged performance with elaborated choreography and the firepower of an arena rock sound system, right away the journalist took noticed of how "the singer kept the upper hand," commenting "She was cool, confident and totally in control." On top of that, she applauded the singer's prowess as a performer to continuously to "engaged with her fans during her entire performance" and was in awe by how "the attention stayed on the confident diva who prowled the stage like she owned it," sharing — "She lit up the place with her exuberance and singing and dancing skills." She concluded her review on this sentiment, "Mya proved repeatedly in her Fresno concert that she has the voice to be a major force in R&B for years to come." Reviewing for The Press of Atlantic City, staff writer Vincent Jackson awarded her concert in Atlantic City a positive review as well. He was most impressed by "how well the singer sings live" and "better than some of her entertainment contemporaries." He concluded his review commenting, "She's clearly an entertainer whose star is on the rise." In a mixed review of her concert at the House of Blues in New York, Kelefa Sanneh of the New York Times opined, “As a singer, Mýa is a great dancer, and that’s nothing to be ashamed.” Commenting on the singer's singing, Sanneh concur, "O.K., her sense of pitch sometimes wandered, and it's clear that vocal improvisation isn't her strong suit." However, she noted “the music sounded best when the beats were loudest" and "her vigorous, loose-limbed movements are reflected in her music, which is sprightly, sexy and theatrical."

== Opening acts ==
- Javier (select dates)
- Snook (Columbia)

== Setlist ==
The following setlist was obtained from the concert held on October 24, 2003, at Dream in Washington, D.C.. It does not represent all concerts for the duration of the tour.

1. "Case of the Ex"
2. "Ghetto Supastar (That Is What You Are)"
3. "Movin' On"
4. "Late"
5. "Ayo!"
6. "Lady Marmalade"
7. "The Best of Me"
8. "You"
9. "Fallen"
10. "All Night Long"
11. "No Sleep Tonight"
12. "It's All About Me"
13. "Free"
14. "Sophisticated Lady"
15. "My Love Is Like...Wo"

== Tour dates ==
Date	City	Country	Venue
North America
October 11, 2003^{[A]}	Fresno	United States	Paul Paul Theatre
October 12, 2003	San Diego	United States	4th & B
October 13, 2003^{[B]}	Perris	United States	Coors Arena
October 14, 2003	Tempe	United States	Marquee Theatre
October 16, 2003	Dallas	United States	Gypsy Tea Room
October 17, 2003	Austin	United States	La Zona Rosa
October 18, 2003^{[C]}	Houston	United States	Health and Physical Education Arena
October 19, 2003	New Orleans	United States	House of Blues
October 21, 2003 (Note: Cancelled)	Atlanta	United States	Variety Playhouse
October 22, 2003 (Note: Cancelled)	Lake Buena Vista	United States	House of Blues
October 23, 2003	North Myrtle Beach	United States	House of Blues
October 24, 2003	Washington, D.C.	United States	Dream
October 25, 2003^{[D]}	Columbia	United States	Mays Arena
October 26, 2003	Atlantic City	United States	Borgata Event Center
October 27, 2003	New York City	United States	B.B. King Blues Club
October 28, 2003	Boston	United States	Wilbur Theatre
October 29, 2003 (Note: Cancelled — a scheduling conflict.)	Ledyard	United States	B.B. King Nite Club
October 31, 2003	Pittsburgh	United States	Club Laga
November 1, 2003	Chicago	United States	House of Blues
November 2, 2003 (Note: Cancelled)	St. Louis	United States	The Pageant
November 3, 2003	Minneapolis	United States	First Avenue
November 6, 2003	Seattle	United States	Showbox Comedy and Supper Club
November 9, 2003	San Francisco	United States	Bimbo's 365 Club
November 10, 2003	West Hollywood	United States	House of Blues

Festivals and other miscellaneous performances
^{A} This concert was a part of "The Big Fresno Fair"
^{B} This concert was a part of the "Southern California Fair"
^{C} This concert was a part of the "TSU Homecoming Concert"
^{D} This concert was a part of "Benedict College Homecoming."
