= Liberation (Mya album) =

Studio album by Mya
- Released: October 22, 2007
- Recorded: 2004–2007
- Genre: R&B
- Length: 50:57
- Label: Universal Motown
- Producers: Carvin & Ivan; Bryan Michael Cox; Detail; Kwamé; Paula Pete; J. R. Rotem; Tricky Stewart; Scott Storch; WyldCard

Mya chronology
Moodring (2003)	Liberation (2007)	Sugar & Spice (2008)

Singles from Liberation
- 1. "Lock U Down" Released: March 27, 2007; 2. "Ridin'" Released: July 17, 2007

Liberation is the fourth album by the American singer-songwriter Mya. It was intended to be her first release with Universal Motown following her departure from Interscope in 2005. Before leaving, she had begun work on an album for Interscope called Control Freak set for a summer release 2005 with production by a host of other producers. Ultimately, she decided to leave A&M and Interscope Records and her management; subsequently Mya made the transition within Universal Music Group to Universal Motown.

Within a three-month period Mya had completed and submitted Liberation to her new label. Production on the album, which was classified as "energetic [and] ghetto" with a less classic R&B edge, was primarily handled by Scott Storch and J. R. Rotem with additional contributions from Bryan Michael Cox, Kwame, Carvin & Ivan, longtime contributor Tricky Stewart, and a handful of others. Guest appearances included Long Beach native Snoop Dogg, Murder Inc. rapper Charlie Baltimore and New Orleans rapper Lil Wayne.

Liberation spawned two singles, the Storch collaboration "Lock U Down" and R&B ballad "Ridin'". Both singles failed to make an impact at radio and on the charts. Due to the industry's budget cuts, the album suffered numerous delays and pushbacks. However while delaying the album's release again Universal Motown accidentally leaked the album in Japan, and Liberation was subsequently released solely as a digital download in Japan on October 22, 2007, Liberation also later received a digital release in Canada. Liberation marked Mya's only release on Universal Motown label following her departure in 2008.

== Conception and production ==
Aside from several recording pauses, Mya had been working on her fourth studio album since 2004 and featured on a few singles, one of them being rapper Cuban Link's single "Sugar Daddy" from Cuban's Chain Reaction album. Originally conceived as a project called Control Freak, the main production of the album was initially financed by A&M Records, following Mya's departure from the Interscope label after the mediocre commercial success of her previous effort Moodring in 2003, and expected to involve contributions by producers and songwriters Scott Storch, Dr. Dre, Jodeci, Lil Jon, Rockwilder and songwriter Sean Garrett. Mya, who took control of the album in her own hands by producing part of the record herself, described the album as "a combination of a Gwen Stefani, because it's energetic, and Lil Jon, very ghetto," with a less classic R&B edge, explaining further: "Control Freak is basically learning how to gain control of a situation yourself, gaining control in order to be [a] free and beautiful person in life." However, although she intended to release a dance track called "Let It Go" at a particular time, she eventually decided to leave both her management and A&M Records in fall 2005 due to personal differences, before signing a new contract with Universal Motown.

During the following months Mya began consulting a few other producers to collaborate on the album, renamed Liberation, including Tim & Bob, Bryan Michael Cox, Kwamé, J. R. Rotem and Tricky Stewart. In search of a new vibe for the album, she drew inspiration by leaving Los Angeles, California and moving back to Washington, D.C., where she spent her formative years. "I just knew that I had to get back to my roots and rediscover what had made me excited in the first place," she said in an interview with Billboard magazine. "I have all this creative energy and all these ideas but LA it was too impersonal of a place to develop a real creative family." Back home, Mya bought a house and enlisted her brother to build a recording studio, where she began experimenting, laying down rudimentary tracks and learning how to engineer. Pushed by her newfound abilities in mixing and production, Mya once again intensified work on the re-worked Control Freak album, with most of it eventually being completed in a stretch of only three month. "It was an easy process because I knew what I wanted to do when I went in," she commented, comparing the making of the album with a therapy. "I've been honest with myself and have been able to admit some things and analyze myself and save myself at the end of the day [...] Liberation is a clean slate; my most expressive, vulnerable album."

== Music and compositions ==
Liberation opens with "I Am", a throbbing uptempo song produced by Kwamé. One of the first songs recorded for Liberation, Mya recalled creating it "kind of therapy" and described it as "very grown and sexy, very spring time, just an all-around feel-good record." Early versions of the song featured guest vocals by St. Louis rapper Penelope Jones instead of Charlie Baltimore. "Walka Not a Talka" incorporates an organic Cali ambiance and harks back to the exoticism of Britney Spears's "I'm a Slave 4 U". It begins with the sound of a siren, while Mya addresses listeners by saying, “I never should’ve left you.” Lyrically, the reflective song chronicles a self-conversation with Mya reminding of all the things she had to get rid of in order to get what she want in life. West Coast rapper Snoop Dogg appears as a guest vocalist on the track. Aggressive "Still A Woman" tells the story an independent woman who needs a man's touch at the end of the day, declaring that she's "always on the hustle doing what a man would do".

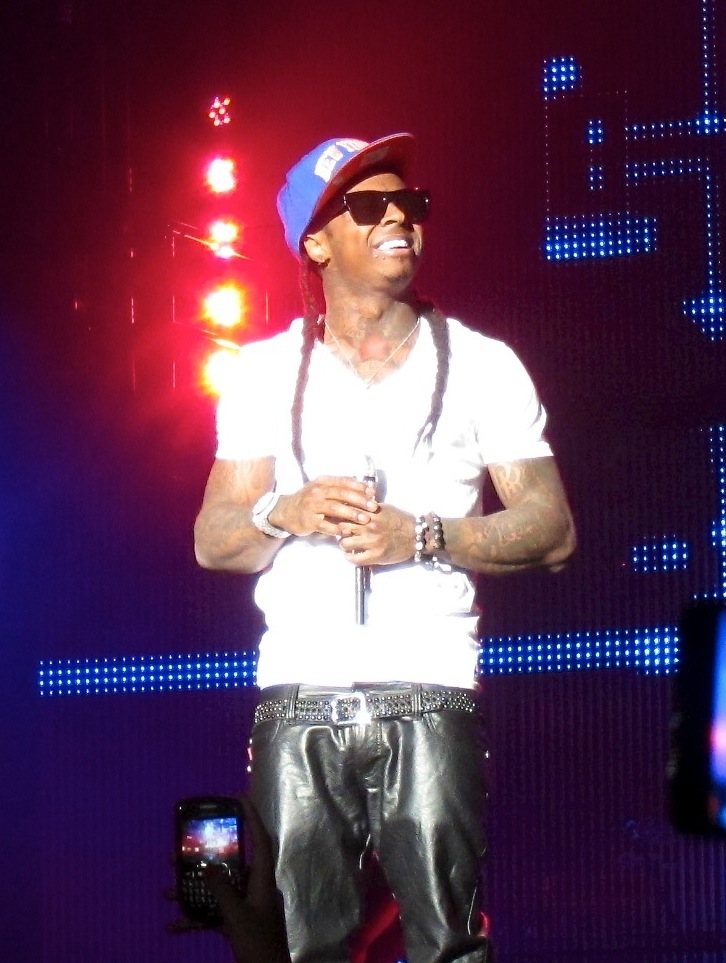
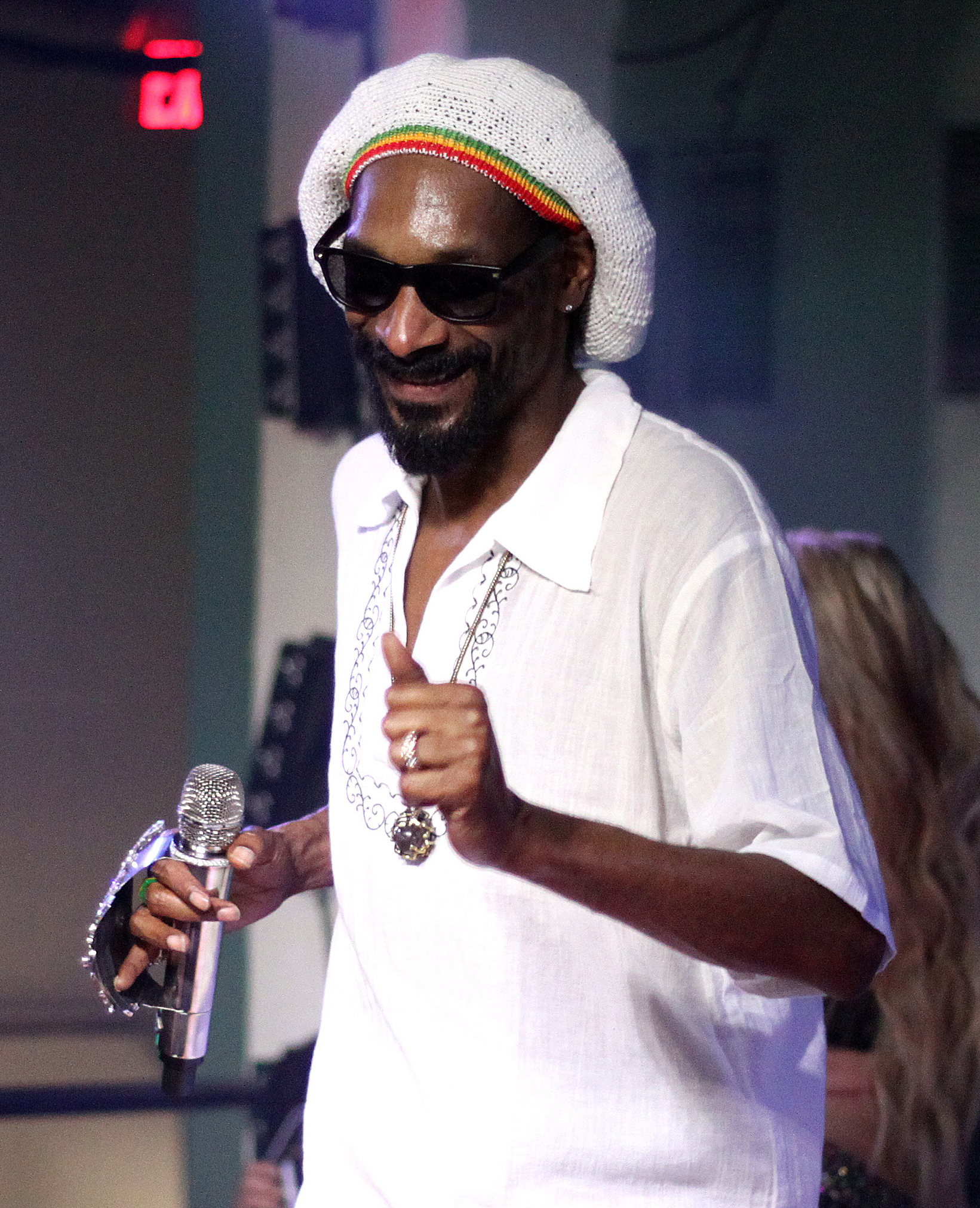
Rappers Lil Wayne (left) and Snoop Dogg both appear on the Liberation album.

"No Touchin'" is a seductive mid-tempo ballad, produced by Konvict inhouse musician Noel "Detail" Fisher. It combines ancient tribal beats and oriental sounds. Similarly, "Lock U Down" featuring Lil Wayne mixes a prominent Eastern harp sample with a guitar riff. A street-but-sweet hip-hop soul jam, it exposes what kind of man a woman wants and needs. "Lights Go Off" is a slow jam, produced by duo Carvin & Ivan, that features Mya adopting a low, subtle vocal tone. Built around a piano, the song starts out with Mya's man leaving her a voice message and ends with another girl answering Mya's boyfriends phone. Ballad "Ridin'" is a break-up throwback to her earlier work in the late 1990s and was inspired by a former relationship in which Mýa suspected her ex-boyfriend of cheating. Frustrated and fed-up with the situation, it details her traffic route past the homes of people important to her man, including his mother, ex-girlfriends, and new lover.

The Carvin & Ivan-produced "Switch It Up" served as the album's ninth track. With a hard hand clap beat and hard lyrics to match, "Switch It Up" shows Mya's man a different side to her. She's being his waitress, his mistress, his everything, but not for long. She's being all these things as a soon to be slap in the face for cheating on her. Mya continues to "Switch It Up" until the end of the song when she begins a little rap verse. Track ten, "Give a Chick a Hand" is a new kind of futuristic crunk sound of music. A different approach to the typical "she stole my man" song, Mya is actually giving kudos to the woman who stole her man. She knows she's hot, but wants to learn how the next woman actually got what was hers. "All in the Name of Love", the album's eleventh track was produced by J. R. Rotem and samples the theme song from the horror film Halloween (1978). Produced by Bryan-Michael Cox, "Life's Too Short" begins with the sound of piano. Mya expresses that she is not going to dwell on anything bad that has happened in her past and is forgetting things that do not matter, expressing that "life is too short for tears". Liberation's final track, "Nothin' at All", was a "pleasant way" to end the album, Rap-Up noted. Produced by Tricky Stewart, "Nothin' at All" sounds like snap music but in slow motion. In the song, Mya addresses plenty of issues that have occurred in her life in the industry. Rap-Up commented, "in this ballad, she clearly is singing her soul out. You can hear and feel her passion. Every line of the song has meaning behind it, even when she sings, 'What don't kill you makes you stronger, stand up longer.'"

== Release and promotion ==
I feel as though Liberation was my best project to date, of course I wanted it released in the US, but things happen, so maybe it wasn't meant to be [...]"

— Mya, ThatGrapeJuice

A release date for Mya's fourth studio album was first indicated in February 2005, when she stated her intention to release the album later that year through her longtime label, A&M Records, via its partnership with Interscope under the Universal umbrella. In June, MTV News reported that recording for the album was nearing completion, with Mya targeting a late-summer release. At the time, the album was tentatively titled Control Freak, and its intended lead single, "Let It Go," was expected to be released shortly thereafter. However, in January 2006, Billboard reported that Mya had departed A&M Records in 2005 and transitioned to Universal Motown Records, then headed by Sylvia Rhone. Much of the material recorded under A&M remained with the label, prompting Mya to begin new recording sessions for her fourth album. The project was subsequently retitled Liberation and was expected to be released in November 2006.

In September 2006, promotional single "Ayo!" was released. Although two further singles from the album followed throughout the following year, Liberation was repeatedly bumped from the US schedule, lastly in September 2007. Mya attributed the delay to "litigations, court, transitioning from label to label, teaching kids [at the Mya Art & Tech Foundation] and building a studio" at first, also citing business related differences as a reason for its push backs. "It's just business you know [...] The music industry is suffering so record companies have to scrap for money. Plus I would rather wait for them to get it right before I do an album." In October 2007, Liberation was accidentally released to the Japanese music market due to label changing the release date again, leading to its overall leak on the Internet. As a result, Universal Motown decided to shelf a physical CD release elsewhere as the company feared that heavy bootlegging would affect sales.

Though Liberation was never released officially. The singer and her label heavily promoted the album through various promotional activities. To kick off promotion for Liberation, the singer graced the covers of the November issue of Sister 2 Sister magazine and the winter issue of Rap-Up magazine. Beginning in April, promotion intensified, Mya co-headlined the eighth annual Seagram's Live Tour with rap duo Clipse. In between touring, the singer performed at the GIANT Show Vol.2 in New York City. She performed the album's first intended single "Lock U Down" as well as a new track entitled "I Am," "Best of Me, Part 2," and "Lady Marmalade." In May, she performed "I Am" at Fashion Cares 2007 in Toronto, Canada. In June, the singer graced the cover of the June/July issue of Vibe Vixen magazine. In July, Mya was invited to perform at the WNBA's All-Star festivities where she performed a medley of her hits as well as a new song "Still A Woman" during the game's halftime show. The following month, she performed new single "Ridin'" at the R&B Live Showcase at Spotlight Live New York City. Starting in September, she was featured on the 2007's BET Black College Tour where she performed at various historical black universities. In October, she participated and performed new material from Liberation at the Nokia Trends Lab concert in Athens, Greece.

=== Singles ===
Universal Motown issued three singles from Liberation. Initially, "Ayo!" was intended to be the album's first single, however the single was scrapped. Produced by Chris "Deep" Henderson, the go-go inspired "Ayo!" featuring DJ Kool was released August 21, 2006 and peaked at number seventy on the Hot R&B/Hip-Hop Songs chart. A music video was planned, however nothing ever materialized. Next up, the street but sweet hip-hop soul jam "Lock U Down" featuring Lil Wayne. Released March 27, 2007, the song was appointed as the album's official first single. A Scott Storch production, the single peaked at number 101 on the bubbling under Hot R&B/Hip-Hop Songs chart only. A commercial failure due to poor radio airplay and lack of promotion thus delaying the album's release. Ballad "Ridin" was the second and final single taken from Liberation and peaked at number fifty-eight on the Hot R&B/Hip-Hop Songs chart. Though the single fared better than its predecessor, it received little radio support and general promotion as well. Universal Motown had also planned to release "Walka Not a Talka" as a single at some point. David LaChapelle was originally supposed to direct a music video for the song, with Patricia Field consulted for styling—but the then-head of marketing of the label thought it was "too weird".

== Critical reception ==
Professional ratings
Review scores
Source	Rating
Blender	2.5/5 stars

Reviewed by a few American critics only, Liberation garnered a generally mixed reception. Dorian Lynskey of Blender magazine gave the album two and a half stars out of five, stating: "A decade into her career, two songs raise the 27-year-old's game—the insidious snake-charmer melody of "'Walka Not a Talka' and the bracing blast of betrayed-housewife rage of 'All in the Name of Love.' Elsewhere, boilerplate slow jams and generic sass paint Mya, her claims to the contrary, as a talka not a walka." Writing for Vibe, Julianne Shepherd gave Liberation a favorable review, noting, "on her fourth album Mya breaks out and swaggers into an intriguing new role".

== Track listing ==
Liberation track listing
No.	Title	Writer(s)	Producer(s)	Length
1.	"Liberation (Intro)"	Mya Harrison		0:18
2.	"I Am" (featuring Charli Baltimore)	Harrison; Kwamé Holland; Alan Gibb; Leroy Randolph; Charisse Rose	Kwamé	3:49
3.	"Walka Not a Talka" (featuring Snoop Dogg)	Harrison; Lyrica Anderson; Evan Bogart; Calvin Broadus; J. R. Rotem	Rotem	3:35
4.	"Still a Woman"	Harrison; Scott Storch	Storch	3:57
5.	"No Touchin'"	Harrison; Noel Fisher	Detail	4:04
6.	"Lock U Down" (featuring Lil Wayne)	Harrison; Storch; Dwayne Carter	Storch	3:37
7.	"Lights Go Off"	Harrison; Ivan Barias; Carvin Haggins; Ezekiel Lewis; Thabiso Nkhereanye	Carvin & Ivan	6:23
8.	"Ridin'"	Harrison; Esther Dean; Traci Hale; Jevon Sims; Christopher Stewart	Tricky Stewart	4:18
9.	"Switch It Up"	Harrison; Barias; Haggins	Carvin & Ivan	4:43
10.	"Give a Chick a Hand"	Harrison; Paula Pete	Pete	4:13
11.	"All in the Name of Love"	Harrison; Rotem	Rotem	3:31
12.	"Life's Too Short"	Harrison; Bryan Michael Cox; Kendrick Dean	Cox; WyldCard^{[a]}	4:02
13.	"Nothin' at All"	Harrison; Stewart	Stewart	4:43

Canadian release bonus tracks
No.	Title	Writer(s)	Producer(s)	Length
14.	"Ayo!" (featuring DJ Kool)	Harrison; Christopher "Deep" Henderson; John Bowman, Jr.	Henderson	3:53
15.	"Escape"	Harrison; Fisher	Storch	3:28
16.	"I'll Still Be Around"	David H. Jones, Jr.; Johnny William Bristol; Neely Dinkins; Vito Colapietro; Wade Brown, Jr.; Rotem	Storch; Rotem	4:08

Notes

- ^{^a} signifies a co-producer
