= Ridin' (Mya song) =

Single by Mya

from the album Liberation
- Released: July 17, 2007
- Length: 3:39
- Label: Universal Motown
- Songwriters: Esther Dean; Traci C. Hale; Mya Harrison; Jevon Sims; Christopher Stewart
- Producer: Christopher "Tricky" Stewart

Mya singles chronology
"Lock U Down" (2007)	"Ridin'" (2007)	"My Bra" (2007)

"Ridin'" is a song by American singer Mya. It was written and composed by Mýa, Ester Dean, Jevon Simms, Traci Hale and Tricky Stewart for her fourth studio album Liberation (2007), with the latter serving as producer. The lyric of the R&B song is based on a personal experience Mýa endured in a relationship at one point in time when she suspected her ex-boyfriend of cheating, finding herself at her lowest point, while chasing him and his affair.

The song was released by Universal Motown as a single in favor over album cuts "I Am" and "Walka Not a Talka" in a poll on Mya's MySpace page voted by fans and after the commercial disappointment of previous single "Lock U Down". Upon release, it received generally positive reviews from contemporary music critics, who complimented on Mya's toned of voice and the topic of the song. A minor success on Billboard's Hot R&B/Hip-Hop Songs chart, it peaked at number fifty-eight. The song's accompanying music video was filmed by Erik White.

== Background ==
"Ridin'" was written by Mýa along with Ester Dean, Jevon Simms, Traci Hale and Tricky Stewart, while production was helmed by the latter. The autobiographical song was inspired by a toxic relationship with a New York-based record producer whom Mýa found cheating after she had moved to Los Angeles to record her third studio album Moodring there. In a 2007 interview with Vibe Vixen she commented: "I became my own private investigator. I found the chick's address; I went riding by. I was calling her cell phone to if he would be in the background. I had her work number, all that." Citing it her "lowest point," she felt encouraged to write a song about her "feeling of helplessness and desperation" in that situation, telling Vibe: "I never, never want to be that woman again, but it happens to a lot of us. I felt like I was playing myself following this dude and hiring this private investigator, just going crazy [...] I was scared to write about these kinds of things before."

== Critical reception ==
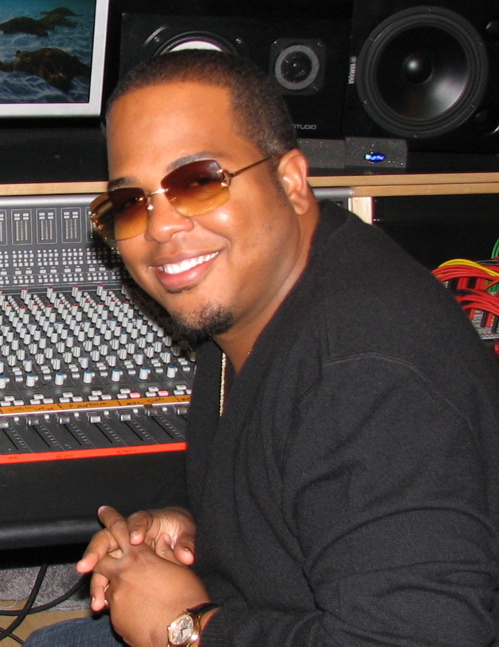
Longtime contributor Tricky Stewart (pictured) produced the song.

In reviewing Ridin', Mark Edward Nero of About.com noted that "stylistically, it's very similar to some songs on Usher's Confessions album, with the major difference being Mýa playing the cheated-on role instead of the cheater." Vibe's Julianne Shepherd called "Ridin'" a "mean jeep jiggler, in which [Mýa] describes scouring the city at 4 a.m. — 'past your ex-bitch's house' — to find her man. She sounds like she's clutching a dagger between her teeth on the track."

== Music video ==
A music video for "Ridin'" was directed by Erik White. It premiered on BET's music video show 106 & Park on September 7, 2007.

== Track listing ==
All tracks produced by Christopher "Tricky" Stewart.

US CD single
No.	Title	Length
1.	"Ridin'" (Clean)	3:41
2.	"Ridin'" (Main)	3:44
3.	"Ridin'" (Instrumental)	3:40

US 12" single
No.	Title	Length
1.	"Ridin'" (Clean)	3:41
2.	"Ridin'" (Instrumental)	3:40
3.	"Ridin'" (Main)	3:44
4.	"Ridin'" (Acappella)	3:40

== Credits and personnel ==
Credits lifted from the liner notes of Liberation.

- Ester Dean – writer
- Traci C. Hale – writer
- Mya Harrison – vocalist, writer
- Jevon Sims – writer
- Christopher "Tricky" Stewart – producer, writer

== Chart ==
Weekly chart performance
Chart (2007)	Peak position
US Hot R&B/Hip-Hop Songs (Billboard)	58

== Release history ==
Release dates and formats
Region	Date	Format	Label	Ref.
United States	July 31, 2007	Rhythmic contemporary radio	Universal Motown	
United States	July 17, 2007	Digital download	Universal Motown	
