= Smoove Jones Show Tour =

2016 concert tour by Mýa

- Tour by Mýa
- Promotional poster for Pt.1 of the Smoove Jones Show
- Associated album: Smoove Jones
- Start date: February 27, 2016
- End date: December 31, 2016
- Legs: 3
- No. of shows: 45 in North America; 1 in Africa; 21 in Oceania; 1 in Middle East; 68 in total

Mýa concert chronology
- Full Frequency Tour (2014); Smoove Jones Show Tour (2016); T.K.O. Tour (2018)

The Smoove Jones Show tour is the third concert tour by American recording artist Mýa. It was launched in support of her seventh studio album, Smoove Jones (2016), and consisted of three legs. The first leg of the tour began on February 27, 2016 and concluded on June 25, 2016.

== Background ==
Mýa said about her Smoove Jones Show tour, "My ass stays on the road! That’s how I fund all of my projects. It might not be on the level of a Madonna. But I'm always somewhere on the globe [laughs]. I prefer to be on the road with other females. India Arie, Erykah Badu, [and] Marsha Ambrosius are so dope to me."

== Critical reception ==
Writing on behalf of Live Nation TV, Layla Halabian gave Mýa's performance a rave review and said, "Mýa wasted no time indulging the audience with hits like "Ghetto Supastar" and "My Love Is Like...Wo"." Commenting on Mýa's interaction with her audience, she wrote, "The relationship between Mýa and her crowd was symbiotic, with each round of applause creating the type of comfortable and easy dynamic that comes from feeling like you've known someone for more than half their life." Halabian concluded her review of the performance, "Seeing Mýa live is like having a pep talk with a best friend who pushes you towards unbearable clarity, through painful moments of realization that are rarely reached on your own."

During her stint on Australia's RNB Friday Live Tour, Mýa's set received mixed to positive feedback from audiences. Staff writer Jessica Leo-Kelton of The Advertiser wrote, "Mýa proved a surprise in a small package, flanked by back-up dancers and showing some vocal gymnastics, the petite performer commanded the attention of the audience running through hits including "Ghetto Supastar" and "Case of the Ex"." The Music's Natasha Pinto concluded, "Adorned in a glittery silver ensemble, Mya begins with "Case Of The Ex (Whatcha Gonna Do)". She possesses the dreamiest falsetto and commands attention with every note and step she takes. After a jaw-dropping dance routine and another glam outfit change, Mýa performs "Lady Marmalade" with absolute ease and sultry sass, accompanied by two back-up dancers who don't miss a beat."

On her solo outings with R&B groups Blackstreet and 112, Mýa continued to receive standing ovations for her performances. Writing for The AU Review, Chris Singh said, "Mýa’s showmanship has certainly not aged, neither have those dulcet notes that stole the show on "Lady Marmalade", or the attitude that made "It's All About Me" and "Case of the Ex" such chart-dominating singles... though she was basically the opener in a triple-threat here, Mýa was a tough act to follow. She also proved to be the most versatile on the night".

== Setlist ==
This set list is representative of the concert on June 3, 2016. It does not represent all concerts for the duration of the tour.

- "It's My Birthday Intro"
1. "Case of the Ex"
2. "Ghetto Supastar (That Is What You Are)"
3. "Best of Me, Part 2"
4. "Girls Dem Sugar"
5. "I'm Still In Love With You" (Sean Paul cover)
6. "My Love Is Like...Wo"
7. "Lady Marmalade"
8. "Spoil Me"

== Shows ==
List of tour dates, showing date, city, country and venue
Date	City	Country	Venue
Leg 1 — North America
February 27, 2016	Chicago	United States	The Promontory
February 28, 2016	Chicago	United States	Society
February 28, 2016	Gary	United States	Top Shelf
March 12, 2016 (Note: The March 12, 2016 concert in Dallas, Texas was an exclusive album release party for Smoove Jones and performance.)	Dallas	United States	Hard Rock Cafe
March 13, 2016	Dallas	United States	Up In Smoke
March 18, 2016	Scottsdale	United States	INTL
March 20, 2016 (Note: The March 20, 2016 concert in Austin, Texas at Ladybird Lake was part of SXSW Festival 2016.)	Austin	United States	SXSW Festival
April 3, 2016	Hollywood	United States	Tiffany's
April 9, 2016 (Note: The April 9, 2016 concert in Los Angeles, California was a co-headlining concert with R&B singer Ginuwine.)	Los Angeles	United States	The NOVO
April 15, 2016 (Note: The April 15, 2016 concert in Corona, California was cancelled.)	Corona	United States	Angel's
April 16, 2016	Oakland	United States	Parliament
April 23, 2016	Dearborn	United States	NarBar
April 24, 2016	Boston	United States	Venu
April 28, 2016	Los Angeles	United States	Echoplex
April 29, 2016	Pomona	United States	VIVE
April 30, 2016	Houston	United States	Engine Room
May 6, 2016 (Note: The May 6, 2016 concert in Palm Springs, California was cancelled.)	Palm Springs	United States	Copa Room
May 13, 2016	Washington D.C.	United States	Howard Theatre
May 20, 2016 (Note: The May 20, 2016 concert in Toronto, Ontario, Canada was part of the Reclaim Your Voice event.)	Toronto	Canada	Innis Town Hall
May 21, 2016	Toronto	Canada	Mingles Lounge
May 27, 2016	Portland	United States	EMPIRE
May 28, 2016	Centreville	United States	Velocity 5
May 30, 2016 (Note: The May 30, 2016 concert in Las Vegas, Nevada was rescheduled.)	Las Vegas	United States	Blue Martini
June 3, 2016	Miami	United States	Edition Hotel
June 18, 2016	El Dorado	United States	Pandora!
June 19, 2016	New Orleans	United States	Harrah's
June 23, 2016 (Note: The June 23, 2016 concert in New York City was part of NYC Pride.)	New York City	United States	Kiehl's
June 24, 2016 (Note: The June 24, 2016 concert in New York City was part of NYC Pride.)	New York City	United States	B.B. King's
June 25, 2016 (Note: The June 25, 2016 concert in New York City was part of NYC Pride.)	New York City	United States	Teaze
Leg 2 —North America
July 2, 2016 (Note: The July 2, 2016 concert in Columbia was a free concert and performance for the USO troops at the U.S. Army's largest training base.)	Columbia	United States	Hilton Field
July 9, 2016 (Note: The July 9, 2016 concert in Orlando was a benefit concert for the victims of the Orlando nightclub shooting.)	Orlando	United States	Parliament
July 10, 2016	Las Vegas	United States	1 OAK
July 23, 2016	Las Vegas	United States	The Grand Pool
July 24, 2016	Las Vegas	United States	Blue Martini
July 29, 2016	Washington D.C.	United States	Howard Theatre
Leg 2 — Africa
August 13, 2016 (Note: The August 13, 2016 concert in Nairobi, Kenya was part of "The Plot" concert organized by PRC (Property Reality Company), a real estate company.)	Nairobi	Kenya	Ngong Racecourse
Leg 2 —North America
September 1, 2016	Minneapolis	United States	Venue
September 10, 2016	Los Angeles	United States	Vibiana Cathedral
September 17, 2016 (Note: The September 17, 2016 concert in Louisville was part of Louisville Pride Festival.)	Louisville	United States	Grinstead Stage
September 24, 2016	San Francisco	United States	Hue!
September 28, 2016	Charlotte	United States	Suite
September 29, 2016	Jacksonville	United States	Suite
September 30, 2016	Pittsburgh	United States	Savoy
October 1, 2016	Pittsburgh	United States	V Lounge
October 7, 2016	Los Angeles	United States	The NOVO
October 8, 2016	Suisun City	United States	Ovation Ultra Lounge
Leg 3 —Oceania
November 16, 2016	Melbourne	Australia	TRAK
November 18, 2016 (Note: The November 18, 2016 concert in Sydney, Australia was a part of the RNB Fridays Live Festival tour.)	Sydney	Australia	Qudos Bank Arena
November 19, 2016 (Note: The November 19, 2016 concert in Brisbane, Queensland was a part of the RNB Fridays Live Festival tour.)	Brisbane	Australia	Eaton's Hill Function Centre
November 20, 2016 (Note: The November 20, 2016 concert in Perth, Australia was a part of the RNB Fridays Live Festival tour)	Perth	Australia	nib Stadium
November 22, 2016 (Note: The November 22, 2016 concert in Adelaide, Australia was a part of the RNB Fridays Live Festival tour.)	Adelaide	Australia	Titanium Security Arena
November 23, 2016	Sydney	Australia	Enmore Theatre
November 24, 2016	Penrith	Australia	Evan Theatre
November 25, 2016 (Note: The November 25, 2016 concert in Melbourne, Victoria was a part of the RNB Fridays Live Festival tour.)	Melbourne	Australia	Hisense Arena
November 26, 2016	Canberra	Australia	MonkeyBAR
December 2, 2016	Sydney	Australia	Magic City
December 3, 2016	Melbourne	Australia	Therapy
December 4, 2016	Docklands	Australia	Allumbra
December 9, 2016	Auckland	New Zealand	The Studio
December 10, 2016	Whangārei	New Zealand	Tikipunga Tavern
December 14, 2016	Wellington	New Zealand	The Grand
December 16, 2016	Palmerston North	New Zealand	Cloverlea Tavern
December 17, 2016	Whanganui	New Zealand	Stellar Bar
December 21, 2016	The Cook Islands	New Zealand	REHAB
December 23, 2016	Manukau	New Zealand	GUADA
December 26, 2016	Sydney	Australia	Cargo Bar
December 27, 2016	Bondi Junction	Australia	Jam Gallery
Leg 3 —Middle East
December 31, 2016	Seef	Bahrain	Ramee Grand
