= Moodring =

Studio album by Mya
- Released: July 22, 2003
- Recorded: February 2001 – January 2003
- Studio: Various: Record Plant (Hollywood, California) (Note: Tracks 1, 2, 4, 10, 11, 13, 16, "Moodring" and "Extacy"); Interscope (Santa Monica, California) (Note: Tracks 1–3, 5, 6, 10, 15, 16 and "Extacy"); Mirror Image Recorders (New York City) (Note: Track 3); Enterprise (Burbank, California) (Note: Tracks 3–5, 8, 13–16, "Moodring" and "Extacy"); Triangle Sound (Atlanta) (Note: Tracks 5 and 6); The Village (West Los Angeles, California) (Note: Engineering on tracks 7 and 12); Studio 24 (Los Angeles) (Note: Tracks 8, 10 and 14); Right Track Recording (New York City) (Note: Tracks 8 and 14); The Hit Factory (New York City) (Note: Track 8); Majestic (North Hollywood, California); Sound on Sound (New York City) (Note: Track 9); Pilot Recording (New York City); Streetlight Music (New York City); Skylab (New York City); Omega (Rockville, Maryland) (Note: Tracks 10 and 11); Soho Music (New York City) (Note: Track 14); Rob Bryton (Toronto) (Note: Track 15)
- Genre: R&B
- Length: 69:15
- Labels: A&M; Interscope
- Producers: Mýa Harrison; Ron Fair; Clue; Don Vito; Duro; Damon Elliott; Missy Elliott; Jerome "Knobody" Foster; Loren Hill; Jimmy Jam and Terry Lewis; Jeff Oakes; Omen; Pino Palladino; James Poyser; Rockwilder; Rich Shelton; Mark Sparks; Christopher "Tricky" Stewart; Ahmir Thompson; Timbaland; Kevin Veney; Diane Warren

Mya chronology
Fear of Flying (2000)	Moodring (2003)	Liberation (2007)

Singles from Moodring
- 1. "My Love Is Like...Wo" Released: June 9, 2003; 2. "Fallen" Released: November 3, 2003

Moodring is the third studio album by American singer Mya, released on July 22, 2003, by A&M and Interscope Records.

Production on Moodring was handled by a bevy of producers and songwriters. Mya enlisted the assistance of producers Ron Fair, Missy Elliott, Timbaland, Rockwilder, Damon Elliott, Jimmy Jam & Terry Lewis, and a handful of others. With this album, Mya wrote "99.9%" of her own lyrics and co-produced many of the album's tracks.

The album received generally positive reviews from music critics, with AllMusic praising Mya for coming up with her best and most varied set of songs yet. Moodring debuted at number three on the Billboard 200 with first-week sales of 113,000 copies, marking Mya's highest debut and first-week sales yet. It was certified gold by the Recording Industry Association of America (RIAA), and has sold 589,000 copies in the United States. Moodring spawned two singles, "My Love Is Like...Wo" and "Fallen", with the former reaching the top 40 in several countries. To further promote the album, Mya embarked on the Moodring Tour. In August 2005, after five years with Interscope Records, Mya decided to part ways with the label and her management.

In July 2023, to commemorate the album's twentieth anniversary, Universal Music Group released a digital deluxe 20th anniversary edition featuring nine songs and remixes previously unavailable on DSPs.

== Background ==
Since the singer's 2000 album Fear of Flying, she earned a Grammy for her contribution to "Lady Marmalade" from the Moulin Rouge! soundtrack and appeared in the Oscar-winning film Chicago. In addition, Mya also served as a pitch woman for Coca-Cola. Speaking about the gap between albums, and her transition from one Interscope-distributed imprint University Music to A&M Records, Mya told Billboard magazine, "this has been the biggest gap between projects. Not knowing when my album would come, working with someone like A&M Records president Ron Fair and the transition from moving from an independent label to Interscope sort of left us in limbo."

Due July 22, 2003, Moodring was her A&M debut. Mya's two prior sets, Fear of Flying and her self-titled debut, were released via then-Interscope-distributed imprint University Music. Consequently, for Mya, who executive-produced Moodring with Fair, fighting for her single was only one example of the creative control she had on the album. "I took control," Mya commented. "It wasn’t about being a stubborn artist. It was just something that I started on my own by calling up people and gathering musicians together."

In fact, the singer fronted funding for the album at the beginning of the studio process, "to create a playground for Mya," she admits. "There were no expectations, because people didn’t even know I was working on an album." In agreements with the singer, Fair shared with Billboard, "Over the last couple of years, she has really matured. A lot of this growth was on a human level, and she applies it to her work. Once I realized that her ideas were coming from a real place of talent and vision, [she] really began to drive the bus."

== Development ==
Although Fear of Flying garnered critical and commercial success, Mya felt unfulfilled and unsatisfied musically and had developed a complex with her last album because it felt more like a concession than her own body of work to her. While speaking with Trace, Mya admitted Fear of Flying was a political war at Interscope Records between her former manager Haqq Islam and CEO Steve Stoute competing with each other. She expressed she was "tired of songs that didn't reveal her vocal capabilities." While acknowledging, that her radio singles were "cool", "nice" and "happy" but didn't really display any of her vocal talent. Mya also bluntly dismissed Fear of Flying as a whole, commenting, "I wouldn't even have bought my last album off of what I presented! In order to buy my last album, I would want more from Mya!"

Frustrated with label politics, she sought to take full control of her next studio effort. Mya named her next project Moodring because she felt there were many facets to this album‚ "ever changing moods, and ever changing colors". With Moodring, Mya's objective was to record an album that she could firmly stand by, and be proud of. Pushed by her newfound freedom, she was instrumental in all creative aspects on the album and credited as a co-writer, co-producer along with Ron Fair as well as served as executive producer. Of her contributions on Moodring, Harrison commented, "I found all my songs this time, with the exception of one or two. I didn't have a puppet master looking over my shoulder, telling me what to, and not do." Harrison further explained, "This time if I didn't write the song, then I produced it. With every song I was hands-on -- the structure of the track, bringing in musicians, and wanting it to sound the way I wanted it to sound."

Convinced that Moodring was her best work to date, she acknowledged she "fronted her own money for studio time, so she could do her own thing. This was the first time in her entire career that she could say that she could breathe." While noting, she took her time with Moodring because she wanted the music to be a representative of Mya.

== Recording ==
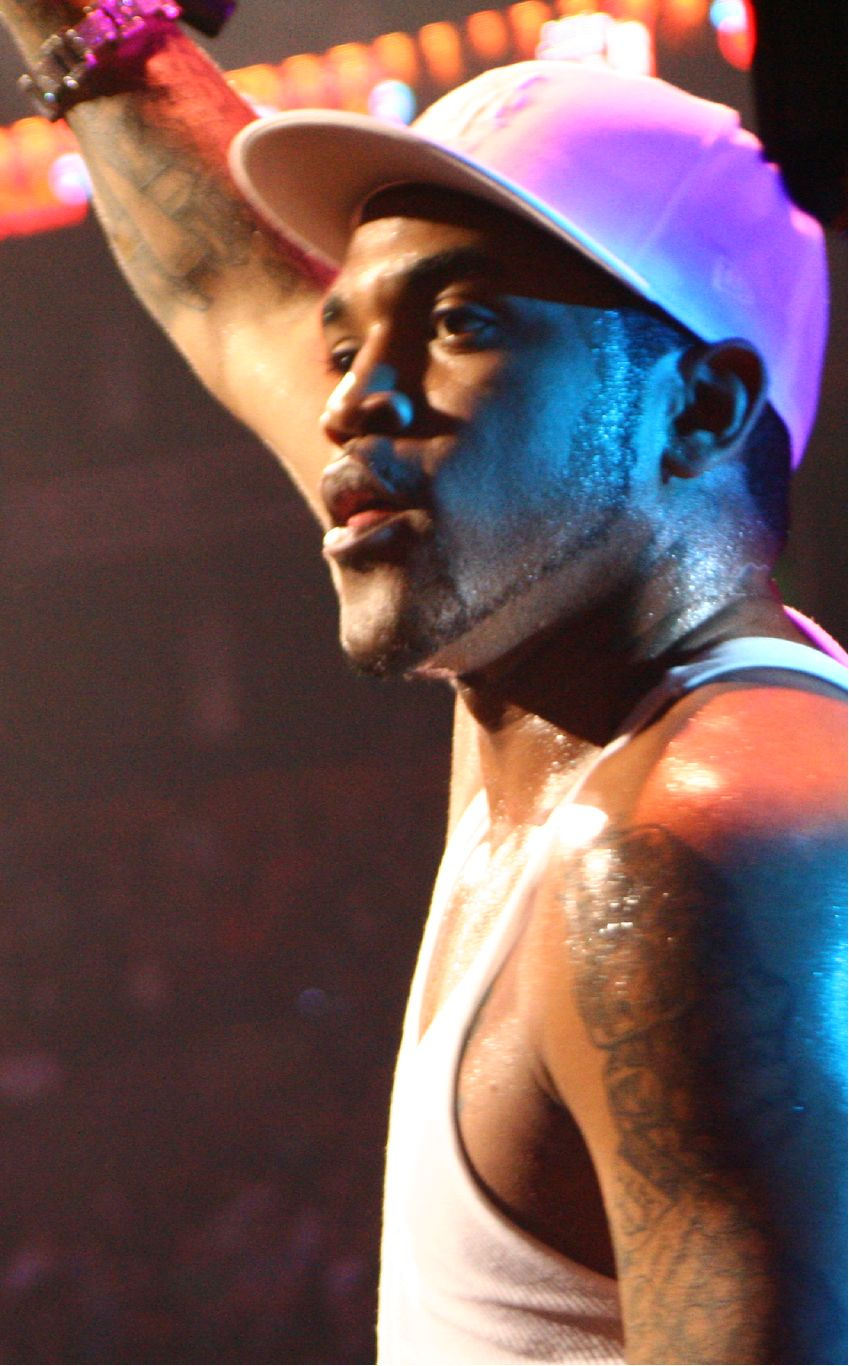
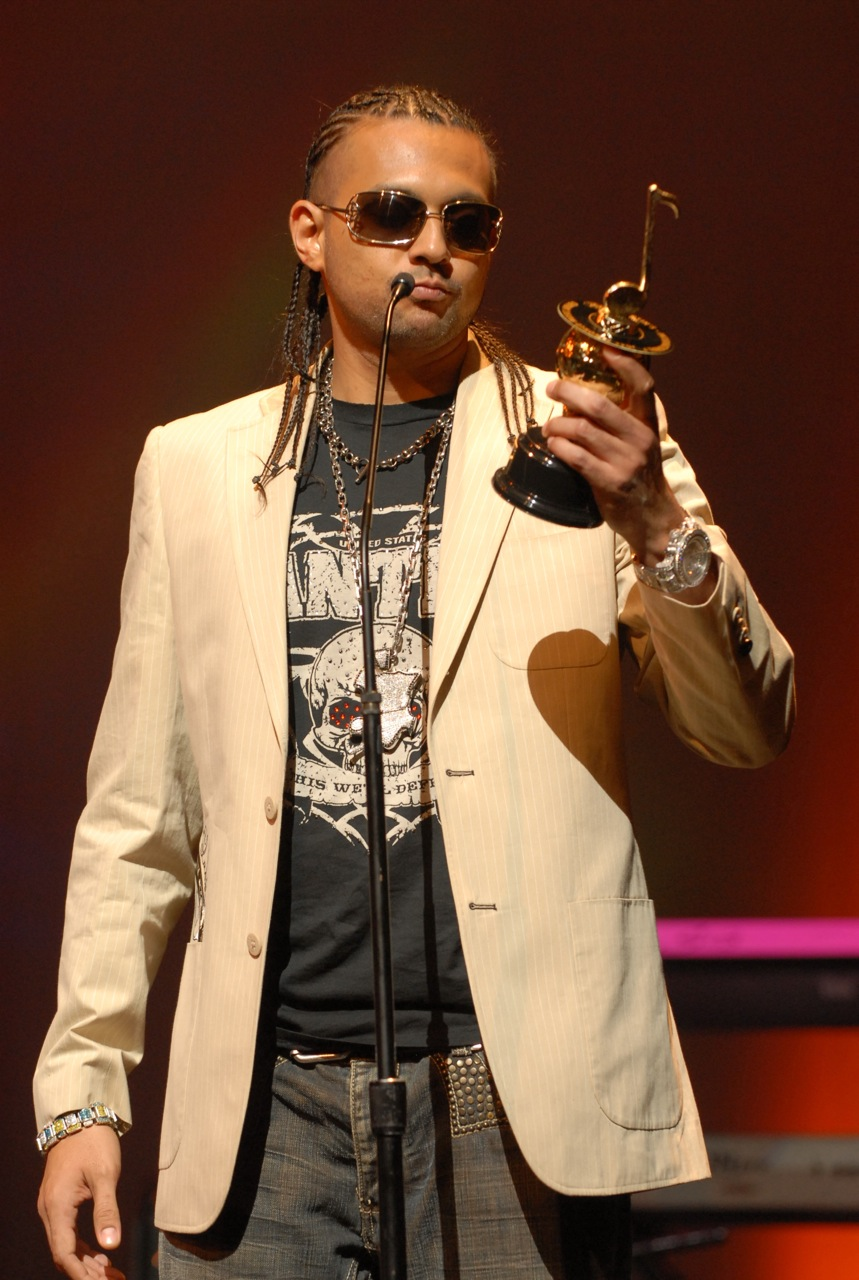
Lloyd Banks (left) and Sean Paul (right) both make guest appearances each on the album

In the beginning stages of her third studio album, Mya booked a lot of her own studio time and invested in equipment on her own. While on the road touring, she would record ideas on her tour bus or in her hotel room, singing to tracks from producers that she'd worked with before and people that she would just run into. Commenting on the process, she elaborated: "I began to write and book studio time. That's how I came up with a lot of lyrical and melodic ideas. However, they weren't fully produced." Impressed with the tracks Mya had worked on while on the road, A&M president Ron Fair offered to serve as the album's executive producer. "He'd bring in a lot of musicians or orchestras or bring a hip-hop track to another level", she said of his contributions. Mya reportedly recorded 60 songs for the album; as a result, only the 16 songs were used. Mya had hoped to work with Shaggy and Prodigy from Mobb Deep, however collaborations failed to materialize.

Tentatively titled Smoke & Mirrors, Moodring was initially characterized as a combination of G-funk, reggae and a little bit of pop rock. Prior to entering a recording studio, Mya had 20 songs already written, produced and mastered before she decided to start recording new material for the album. Admittedly, Mya hoped that the album would show her maturity as an artist. "I've grown up and gone through some things, so I'm expressing what I feel", she noted. Unlike her second album Fear of Flying (2000), which addressed somewhat superficial relationship issues, the singer envisioned her new material to be more real and personal, prompting her to pen her own lyrics for this album, according to Damon Elliott, who produced six songs on the disc. Elliott said Mya's lyrical development was not a shock tactic or an effort to keep up with her racy peers – it is more a sign of her own maturation and her interest in being honest and open. Concluding, "Mya can stand on her own", Elliott said. "Her album is gonna be off the chain. It's gonna be off the hook, man."

== Music and composition ==
Previewed by Trace magazine, journalist Omar Dubois observed, "thematically Moodring was more consistently optimistic than Fear of Flying, which he declared was engulfed in adolescent cynicism. Comprising sixteen tracks, Moodring was viewed as the singer's most personal album and a sonic indicator of how she was living, loving and creating in 2003 with songs that ranges from emotional to erotic. An eclectic album, Moodring encompasses a selection of genres from edgy hip-hop flavors to smoothed out soul to banging techno to understated pop and sultry reggae. Its production incorporates a grab bag of great beats, well-orchestrated harmonies, throw-away gook, and suggestively seductive vocal hooks. Constructed as a concept record, each track on Moodring represents a mood in which the singer changes up her tone, her message, and her image from song to song. Lyrically open, Moodring explores a broad range of topics, from bad relationships, to the other woman, to knockin' boots.

Moodring opens with the Missy Elliott-produced "My Love Is Like...Wo", a "sexy, no holds-barred" song about a woman in control sexually and emotionally. It is followed by "Fallen", the titillating mid-tempo jeep-banger which cleverly interpolates the Pharcyde's "Runnin'." Serving as the album's third track "Why You Gotta Look So Good?" tells the story of the singer struggling to leave a bad relationship. Built on strong and soulful deep vibratos, the singer utters admonition against a bad-news lover she cannot leave. G-Unit member Lloyd Banks guest stars on the track, rapping from a male perspective about the same woeful situation. Next up, the hypnotic, drum and keyboard-driven, Timbaland-laced "Step". The album's fifth track, "Sophisticated Lady", previously known as "Cold Blooded", is a funk-baptized, palpitating bedding. On this record, Trace magazine described Mya as a spunky, seductive, femme-fatale. An ode to Prince and Rick James, Mya explained the concept behind the song, commenting, "I love that pretty s*$%, that pimp s*$%" "That's the s*$% that turns me on when I go to see a stage show. I love Rick like crazy, but Prince is the ultimate of that crazy, feminine, pretty man s*$%! I love it, it's drama! But it's still masculine, because it turns women on! And now, I just flipped it as a female."

The sultry, invitingly delivered "No Sleep Tonight" plays like an X-rated Boyz II Men song, with a sexy old school R&B beat over slinky, sensual vocals and served as the album's sixth track. Ditto for the hot-flash inducing seventh track "Anatomy 1 on 1," with its slow, deliberate that's beat perfect for nights alone with that special someone. Ninth track, the pop soulish Marvin Gaye meets Neneh Cherry choon "Things Come & Go", featured dancehall rapper Sean Paul. It is followed by the album's tenth track, the "heartfelt" ballad "You." Complimented with Lamont Dozier's strings and in reminiscent of a 70s soul vibe, "After the Rain" serves as the album's eleventh track. A Jimmy Jam & Terry Lewis production, the pregnancy-scare narrative "Late" serves as the album's twelfth track. A garage-driven number, "Whatever Bitch" was primarily inspired by a gay dance called wagging, and drag queens at the KitKatClub in Berlin. While previewing the album, Trace noted "Whatever Bitch" had all the potential of being a staple on the club scene stateside, and a contender for the prime position on the European club and pop charts. Unbeknownst to the public, an artist had offered Mya and her label a million dollars for the song. Track fifteen, the soothing, acoustic guitar-laden "Take a Picture" was co-written by former collaborator Pink and initially intended for her second studio album Missundaztood (2001). As with "Whatever Bitch", Trace noted "Take a Picture" had the potential to be a "towering cross-over smash". Closing the album is a cover of Tom Petty's Free Fallin'. Arranged to Petty's distinctive chord progression-albeit played on piano, the singer's version is a brand-new entity, a confused story about a lost soul looking to Jesus Christ for direction.

== Release and promotion ==
Initially, Mya's third studio album was scheduled for release in November or December 2002 with the album's first single expected to be out in September 2002; however, nothing ever materialized and the release date was postponed to February 25, 2003, then moved to June 24, 2003, before her label settled on July 22, 2003. Speaking with Billboard, Mya appointed the album's delay due to her transitioning within the Universal Music system from an independent label to A&M Records. After much delay, Interscope released Moodring on July 16, 2003, in Japan. Five days later, Moodring arrived in stores on July 21, 2003, in the United Kingdom and the following day in the United States. Subsequently, Moodring was released on September 8, 2003, in Germany. As strategic marketing, her label, Interscope coupled Moodring with limited-edition calendars. To kick off promotion for Moodring, Mya appeared and performed "Turn The Beat Around" on The Disco Ball. Taped in 2002, the ABC special aired on January 16, 2003.

In late 2002, The Coca-Cola Company signed Mya to star in their new advertising campaign. Joined by rapper Common, their spot featured the two singing an original song based on the 1960s jazz hook of Eddie Harris' "Compared to What". Interspersed are scenes of each singer casting an amused but skeptical eye on the trappings of celebrity. The 90-second commercial aired during the 30th American Music Awards on January 13, 2003. During a press conference, Dominic Sandifer, senior VP of strategic marketing for Interscope, Geffen, and A&M at Universal Music Group, explained the motion behind the ideal joint project for labels nowadays, noting the Coca-Cola's campaign starring Mya and Common. He commented, "the beverage company licensed the song 'Real Compared to What' for use in its spots, placed Mya and Common in the ad and ran the campaign to coincide with the July release of Mya's album Moodring which featured their version of 'Real Compared to What'. The campaign was worth more than $10 million in promotional TV and radio media for Moodring.

In February, the singer co-hosted CBS Countdown to the Grammys special. In April, for MTV's TRL High School Week, she paid a visit to her old high school. Beginning in May promotion intensified, announced via the singer's website an NBC Mya Concert Special presented by Maxim magazine was arranged where 200 fans had a chance to be on television and watch Mya perform her new single. On May 3rd, Apple offered consumers an exclusive download of "Fallen" at iTunes store. On May 12, "My Love Is Like...Wo" premiered via the singer's website. On May 27, she performed "My Love Is Like...Wo" live on TRL at MTV Beach House during Spankin' New Music Week. In June, the singer made an appearance at the MTV Movie Awards as a presenter. On the press front the singer graced the cover of several popular magazines which included the June cover of Trace, the Sep./Oct. issue of men monthly KING magazine, and the January 2004 issue of Rap-Up. On June 26, she performed live at the Virgin Mega Store followed by an autograph session with fans.

On July 13, 2003, she performed "My Love Is Like...Wo" at MTV's Carson Daly Bash. During the album's release week, Mya hosted BET's The Center all week long beginning July 20 and Sucka Free Sundays on MTV2 July 21, performed on Live! With Regis and Kelly as well as made appearances on Extra and Access Hollywood July 22, hosted 106 & Prime July 23rd, performed on NBC daytime drama Passions on July 24 and BET's 106 & Park July 25. In addition, she made in-store appearances at Downtown Locker Room in Maryland and Cisco's Music in Chicago July 25–26 respectively. The following month in August, Mya was featured in the August issue of Blender magazine. In early August, she performed live on WB's Pepsi Smash. On August 25, she gave a one on one interview and a live performance of "My Love Like Is...Wo" on LAUNCH. On September 13, 2003, Mya performed on the sketch comedy show Mad TV. She made guest appearances on The Wade Robson Project September 6 and 19 respectively. In October 2003, Mya performed at Lifetime's fourth annual "Women Rock!" benefit concert. She performed her own rendition of Lena Horne's "Stormy Weather". She also performed at the GQ Men of the Year Awards. In November 2003, she was invited to perform at 77th Annual Macy's Thanksgiving Day Parade. Additionally, in November as well, she was featured on MTV's hidden camera-practical joke show Punk'd. In December 2003 Mya made an appearance on the Late Late Show with Craig Kilborn. Filmed in November, Mya performed on the CBS' fifth annual A Home for the Holidays special which aired in December as well. As part of ongoing promotion, starting in May 2004, snack food Doritos arranged a deal with Universal Music & Video Distribution. Under a deal with Universal Music & Video Distribution, Doritos featured artists from UMVD-distributed labels on 180 million bags of its snack food through the end of the year. The singer was assigned the guacamole flavor with her picture on her respective bag and associated album Moodring on the back.

=== 20th anniversary ===
On July 28, 2023, the singer re-released her third album Moodring, as a digital deluxe edition on digital and streaming services featuring nine songs and remixes previously unavailable on digital streaming platforms for its 20th anniversary. Among the bonus tracks, it featured three originals from international editions of Moodring namely "EXtacy," "Little Too Much, Little Too Late," and the title track. In addition, it contained four remixes of "My Love Is Like...Wo" — a "Jersey Club" remix produced by DJ Flex, the "AllStar Mix-Main Pass" remix featuring John Doe, "Swizz Mix/Radio Mix with Rap" version featuring Cassidy and another "without rap" as well as two remixes of "Fallen" which features Fat Lip and Tre.

=== Singles ===
"Get Up," an uptempo track with a party club vibe was initially announced as the album's first single, however the song was eventually re-recorded by labelmate Keyshia Cole and relinquish to the Biker Boyz soundtrack. Instead, "My Love Is Like...Wo" was selected to be released as the album's lead single. Released and serviced to radio on June 9, 2003, the song became commercial success at mainstream radio, where it peaked at number 13 on the US Billboard Hot 100 and number 17 on the US Hot R&B/Hip-Hop Songs chart, becoming Mya's fifth solo top 40 single. Abroad, it was a moderate success internationally, charting within the Top 40 in territories the United Kingdom, Ireland, New Zealand, and Australia. The album's second and final single, "Fallen," was released and serviced to radio on November 3, 2003. A modest success, it peaked at number 51 on the Billboard Hot 100, while reaching number 35 on the Hot R&B/Hip-Hop Songs chart. "Things Come & Go" featuring Sean Paul was initially planned as a single as well. Interscope had selected the song as Moodring's second international single and commissioned a music video to be filmed in Miami. Interscope's intentions were to push "Things Come & Go" internationally since Sean Paul had achieved recent success, and was keen to make Mya a success in international territories as well. The plans were later scrapped.

== Critical reception ==
Professional ratings
Aggregate scores
Source	Rating
Metacritic	63/100
Review scores
Source	Rating
AllMusic	4/5 stars
Blender	3/5 stars
Entertainment Weekly	B−
MTV Asia	7/10
PopMatters	4/10
Rolling Stone	3/5 stars
USA Today	3/4 stars
Vibe	3/5 stars

Moodring received generally positive reviews from music critics. At Metacritic, which assigns a weighted mean rating out of 100 to reviews from mainstream critics, the album received an average score of 63, based on 9 reviews, which indicates "generally favorable reviews". AllMusic editor Andy Kellman gave the album 4 out of 5 stars and wrote that "with all the emotional and stylistic range that an album called Moodring should present Mya comes up with her best and most varied set of songs yet." He felt that while "the constant changes of direction can be a little jarring on the first couple plays, they eventually become one of the album's charms." Similarly, Lewis Dene of BBC Music declared the album her "most complete and accessible yet", noting that with Moodring "Mya's set to further remind listeners of her ability to shrewdly bridge the gap between pop/R&B and street-level hip hop." Sasha Frere-Jones, writing for Slate, called Moodring the "most consistent R&B album of the year." Music Week felt that Mya was now "successfully recognised as an artist in her own right" and that the album had been "created to support her status as a soulful, funky diva, with a concoction of funky R&B beats, seductive ballads and a plethora of rap contributions".

Tracy E. Hopkins, writing for Rolling Stone, called the album an "ambitious third disc" that "reintroduces the former good girl as a sex kitten – a transformation that began with the Grammy-winning 'Lady Marmalade'." She noted that "whatever her emotion, the eclectic Moodring effectively captures the evolving sensibilities of this rising star." In his review for USA Today, Steve Jones commenced that Mya "has matured nicely since her debut nearly five years ago. She shows no fear of flying off in new, creative directions." Vibe editor Dimitri Ehrlich noted that though Mya "doesn't add any real depth to her artistic sack, she captivates by revealing another stage in her development – as a woman." Entertainment Weekly's writer Neil Drumming gave the album a B− rating, commenting that "at best, Moodring exhibits some minor genre dabbling, but truthfully, Mya's source material hasn't broadened much." In speaking of Mya's voice, he said: "Without a commanding voice to override such outdated overtures, Mya's efforts sound strikingly out of touch."

People found that "at times Moodring, with its trip-hop beats and sensual slow jams, is reminiscent of Aaliyah; other times the disc’s pop-R&B sheen brings to mind a younger Janet Jackson. Like both of those singers, Mya has developed a feathery sexiness to go along with the natural sweetness of her soprano, which nevertheless wouldn’t scare the competition on American Idol. Still, this is the stuff that real pop idols are made of." Blender's James Hunter felt that "Mya gets lost on Moodring. The album has no point of view, no way of joining the great Jam-Lewis moments with the crasser stuff. A lover of dance and Broadway who wants to communicate with teens as well as adults, she faces the tall order of making real mink connect with real asphalt, and being Halle Berry with a mic." Terry Sawyer from PopMatters wrote that "for the most part, Moodring sinks like a stone." Declaring the album mixed to her disadvantage, while declaring Mya's voice as "thin", she felt the album "is supposed to be sexy and yearning, but it doesn't rise to the sincerity of a soap opera." The Village Voice editor Carol Cooper found that "although Mya varies her album's mood with sweet pop-dancehall and trendy 'I'll kick your ass' rants, she's really waiting for one of her insatiable nooky anthems to win her the ever rotating demon-lover franchise on America's pop charts."

=== Accolades ===
Moodring was featured on The Village Voice's Pazz & Jop end of the year critics list.

Year	Ceremony	Award	Result	Ref.
2003	Washington Area Music Awards	Urban Contemporary Recording	Nominated	

== Commercial performance ==
In the United States, Moodring debuted at number three on the Billboard 200 and at number two on Billboard's Top R&B/Hip Hop Albums chart, selling 113,000 copies in its first week of release. It marked the highest-selling week of her career up to that point, as well as Mya's highest-peaking album yet on both charts. In its second week, Moodring sold additional 59,700 copies, while dropping to number nine on the Billboard 200. In total, it spent a total of 18 non-consecutive weeks on the chart and was eventually certified gold by the Recording Industry Association of America (RIAA) on September 25, 2003. As of August 2006, it had sold 589,000 copies in the United States.

Internationally, the album was less successful than her previous albums Mya (1998) and Fear of Flying (2000). While Moodring debuted and peaked at number 74 on the Australian Albums Chart, it failed to enter the top 75 of the UK Albums Chart, peaking at number 197. It, however, debuted and peaked at number 25 on the Canadian Albums Chart, becoming Mya's highest-charting album there to date, and peaked at number 53 on the Japan Oricon Albums Chart.

== Impact and legacy ==
In celebration of the album's fifteenth anniversary, an editor of the web publication The Boombox published an article on July 20, 2018, revisiting the album and calling Moodring "an underrated gem". The editor applauded Mya for pushing the envelope and evolving into her own as an entertainer. David Levesley of British GQ saluted the singer as a "triple threat", who can also write and orchestrate, and said Moodring "deserves to be remembered as one of the great R&B albums of the early 21st century." In 2023, in honor of their "2003 week", celebrating the music of 20 years ago, Billboard included "Things Come & Go" in their list of the 40 Best Deep Cuts of 2003. Reviewer J'na Jefferson called "Things Come & Go" an "island-flavored jam", and noted that "[b]oth artists [Mya and Sean Paul] match the laid-back energy of the tune, but Mya's stunning vocal layering befits the times – and would work today as well." Rolling Out's Nagashia Jackson commended the singer and its body of work as Moodring "established her as a forward-thinking architect of contemporary R&B, blending traditional soul influences with progressive electronic and hip-hop elements."

Though Moodring underperformed commercially, partially due to the singer's label relegating the project "more single-orientated rather than movement-orientated," whilst leaving consumers "confused" and "lack of completion" with the album, yet the album's singles made a lasting impression on artists and critics alike. While speaking with Vevo during the filming of music video for "Love Lies" in collaboration with fellow singer Khalid on her solo performance, singer Normani cited "My Love Is Like...Wo" music video as an inspiration. During a Q&A with fans on Twitter, singer Chlöe when asked if she could recreate any music video, she responded, "My Love Is Like...Wo" as her choice and cited the song as inspiration as well. Indie recording artist Dawn Richards applauded Mya and "My Love Is Like...Wo" video, commenting, "Mya was one of the first artists to really push different styles of dance in her videos." Speaking on behalf of the song's music video, she raved, "In [My Love is Like] Whoa" she was tap dancing and she did a little bit of hip-hop, then there was jazz moments." While concluding, Mya was "really pushing the bar." Rap duo ABN sampled "My Love Is Like...Wo" for their track "My Momma." AllMusic's Andy Kellman selected "Fallen" as one of his favorite charting R&B singles during 2000–2009 decade. Philippine singer Kyla cites "Fallen" as one of her favorite songs.

== Track listing ==
Moodring – standard edition
No.	Title	Writer(s)	Producer(s)	Length
1.	"My Love Is Like...Wo"	Missy Elliott; Charles Bereal; Kenneth Bereal	M. Elliott; CKB^{[a]}; Ron Fair^{[b]}	3:29
2.	"Fallen"	Luiz Bonfá; Maria Toledo; Leonard "Hugg" Huggins; Richard Shelton; Loren Hill; Kevin Veney	Shelton; Hill; Veney; Fair	3:34
3.	"Why You Gotta Look So Good?" (featuring Lloyd Banks)	Mya Harrison; Teron Beal; Christopher Lloyd; Dana Stinson	Rockwilder; Harrison	4:39
4.	"Step"	M. Elliott; Timothy Mosley; Harrison	M. Elliott; Timbaland; Harrison^{[c]}; Fair^{[c]}	3:15
5.	"Sophisticated Lady"	Harrison; Rudy Currence; James Johnson	Don Vito; Christopher "Tricky" Stewart; Harrison; Fair	3:51
6.	"No Sleep Tonight"	Stewart; Tab Nkhereanye; Currence; Jeff Oakes (interlude); Mark Sparks (interlude)	Stewart; Harrison^{[a]}; Fair^{[a]}; Oakes (interlude); Sparks (interlude)	4:12
7.	"Anatomy 1On1"	Harrison; James Harris III; Terry Lewis; Bobby Ross Avila; Issiah Avila	Jimmy Jam and Terry Lewis; B.R. Avila^{[a]}; Iz^{[a]}; Harrison^{[c]}	4:35
8.	"Hurry Up" (featuring Gunz)	Harrison; Derek Cooper; Ernesto Shaw; Kenneth Ifill	Harrison; Clue; Duro	4:29
9.	"Things Come & Go" (featuring Sean Paul)	Harrison; Paul; Shuggie Otis	Jerome "Knobody" Foster; Harrison; Fair	3:57
10.	"You"	Shelton; Hill; Veney; Marthea "Buttah" Jackson	Shelton; Hill; Veney; Fair; Harrison^{[b]}	4:08
11.	"After the Rain"	Harrison; Beal; McKinley Jackson; Thealodius Reddick; Lamont Dozier	Shelton; Hill; Veney; Harrison^{[a]}	3:57
12.	"Late"	Harrison; Harris; Lewis; B.R. Avila; I. Avila; Eddie Cole	Jimmy Jam and Terry Lewis; B.R. Avila^{[a]}; Iz^{[a]}; Harrison^{[c]}	4:44
13.	"Whatever Bitch"	Harrison; Damon Elliott	D. Elliott; Harrison	4:20
14.	"Taste This"	Harrison; Sydney Brown; Kris Ricat; James Czeiner	Omen; Harrison	4:36
15.	"Take a Picture"	D. Elliott; Pink	D. Elliott; Fair^{[b]}; Harrison^{[b]}	3:29
16.	"Free Fallin'"	Jeffrey Lynne; Thomas Earl Petty	D. Elliott; Harrison^{[a]}; Fair^{[a]}	3:54
17.	"Real Compared to What" (featuring Common; bonus track)	Eugene McDaniels	Fair; Pino Palladino; James Poyser; Ahmir Thompson	3:58

Moodring – international edition bonus track
No.	Title	Writer(s)	Producer(s)	Length
17.	"Moodring"	Harrison; D. Elliott; Melissa Wright	D. Elliott	3:31

Moodring – UK edition bonus track
No.	Title	Writer(s)	Producer(s)	Length
18.	"Extacy"	Harrison; D. Elliott	D. Elliott; Harrison; Fair^{[b]}	4:13

Moodring – Japanese edition bonus track
No.	Title	Writer(s)	Producer(s)	Length
19.	"Little Too Much, Little Too Late"	Diane Warren	Warren; Fair	3:24

Moodring – 20th anniversary edition bonus tracks
No.	Title	Writer(s)	Producer(s)	Length
18.	"Extacy"	Harrison; D. Elliott	D. Elliott; Harrison; Fair^{[b]}	3:49
19.	"Little Too Much, Little Too Late"	Diane Warren	Warren; Fair	3:24
20.	"Moodring"	Harrison; D. Elliott; Wright	D. Elliott	3:30
21.	"My Love Is Like...Wo" (DJ Flex Jersey Club Remix)	M. Elliott; C. Bereal; K. Bereal	M. Elliott; CKB^{[a]}; Fair^{[b]}; DJ Flex^{[d]}	2:36
22.	"My Love Is Like...Wo (Part II)" (All-Star Mix-Main Pass; featuring John Doe)	M. Elliott; C. Bereal; K. Bereal	M. Elliott; CKB^{[a]}; Fair^{[b]}; Allen "Allstar" Gordon Jr.^{[d]}	3:51
23.	"My Love Is Like...Wo (Part III)" (Swizz Mix / Radio Mix with Rap; featuring Cassidy)	M. Elliott; C. Bereal; K. Bereal	M. Elliott; CKB^{[a]}; Fair^{[b]}; Swizz Beatz^{[d]}	3:15
24.	"My Love Is Like...Wo (Part III)" (Swizz Beatz Radio Mix without Rap)	M. Elliott; C. Bereal; K. Bereal	M. Elliott; CKB^{[a]}; Fair^{[b]}; Swizz Beatz^{[d]}	2:55
25.	"Fallen" (The Remix Original; featuring Tre and Fatlip)	Bonfá; Toledo; Huggins; Shelton; Hill; Veney; Derrick Stewart; Trevant Hardson	Shelton; Hill; Veney; Fair^{[d]}	4:07
26.	"Fallen" (The Remix Plus; featuring Tre and Fatlip)	Bonfá; Toledo; Huggins; Shelton; Hill; Veney; Stewart; Hardson	Shelton; Hill; Veney; Fair^{[d]}	4:07

Notes

- ^{^[a]} signifies a co-producer
- ^{^[b]} signifies an additional producer
- ^{^[c]} signifies a vocal producer
- ^{^[d]} signifies a remix producer

Sample credits

- "Fallen" contains excerpts and elements from "Saudade Vem Correndo" (1962) as performed by Stan Getz and Luiz Bonfá.
- "Sophisticated Lady" contains replayed elements from "Cold Blooded" (1983) as performed by Rick James.
- "Things Come & Go" contains excerpts from "Aht Uh Mi Hed" (1974) as performed by Shuggie Otis.
- "After the Rain" contains excerpts and elements from "Let Me Make Love to You" (1973) as performed by Lamont Dozier.
- "Take a Picture" contains elements from "(Lay Your Head on My) Pillow" (1994) as performed by Tony! Toni! Toné!

== Personnel ==
Credits adapted from the liner notes of Moodring.

Performers and musicians

- Alex Al – bass guitar
- Romeo Antonio – guitar
- Kyle Armbrust – viola
- Ravi Best – trumpet
- Sandra Billingslea – violin
- Krystyana Chelminski – violin
- Eddie Cole & His Gang – bass, guitar
- Luis Conte – percussion
- James Czeiner – violin, horn
- Earl Flemming – keyboard
- Steve Ferrone – drums
- Eileen Folson – viola, cello
- Clark Gayton – trombone
- G.A. Grant – horn
- Gary Grant – horn
- Darryl Harper – keyboard
- O.J. Harper – keyboard
- Jerry Hey – horn
- Dan Higgins – horn
- Cecelia Hobbs Gardner – violin
- Jun Jensen – cello
- Natalie Leggett – violin, viola
- Jerry Ney – horn
- Joel Peskin – horn
- Bill Reichenbach Jr. – horn
- Kris Ricat – guitar, horn
- Maxine Roach – viola
- Derek Scott – guitar
- Carl "Butch" Small – percussion
- Michael Valerio – bass

Technical

- Mike Anzel – engineer
- Marc Baptiste – photography
- Patrice Bowie – vocal assistance
- Bruce Buechner – engineer
- Randy Bugnitz – engineer
- Sue Ann Carwell – vocal assistance
- Ian Cross – engineer
- Eric Dawkins – vocal assistance
- Jimmy Douglass – engineer
- Dylan Dresdow – engineer
- Laurie Evans – vocal assistance
- Ron Fair – vocal production
- Drew FitzGerald – art direction
- David Guerrero – engineer
- Mark Harrison – vocal production
- Tal Herzberg – engineer
- Troy Hightower – engineer
- Pete Karam – engineer
- Matt Marrin – engineering assistance
- Sheryl Nields – photography
- Dave Pensado – mixing engineer
- Eddy Schreyer – mastering engineer
- Brian Summerville – engineer
- Brian "B Luv" Thomas – engineer
- Ryan West – engineer
- Katrina Willis – vocal assistance
- Ethan Willoughby – mixing assistance
- Doug Wilson – engineer
- Frank Wolf – engineer

== Charts ==
=== Weekly charts ===
Weekly chart performance
Chart (2003)	Peak position
Australian Albums (ARIA)	74
Canadian Albums (Nielsen SoundScan)	25
Japanese Albums (Oricon)	53
UK Albums (Official Charts)	197
UK R&B Albums (Official Charts)	36
US Billboard 200	3
US Top R&B/Hip-Hop Albums (Billboard)	2

=== Year-end charts ===
2003 year-end chart performance
Chart (2003)	Position
US Billboard 200	157
US Top R&B/Hip-Hop Albums (Billboard)	86

== Certifications and sales ==
Certifications and sales
Region	Certification	Certified units/sales
Japan	—	14,293
United States (RIAA)	Gold	589,000

== Release history ==
Release dates and formats
Region	Date	Edition(s)	Format(s)	Label(s)	Ref.
Japan	July 16, 2003	Standard	CD; digital download	Interscope	
United Kingdom	July 21, 2003	Standard	CD; digital download	Interscope	
United States	July 22, 2003	Standard	CD; digital download	Interscope	
Australia	September 1, 2003	Standard	CD; digital download	Interscope	
Germany	September 8, 2003	Standard	CD; digital download	Interscope	
Austria	October 29, 2003	Standard	CD; digital download	Interscope	
Switzerland	October 29, 2003	Standard	CD; digital download	Interscope	
Worldwide	July 28, 2023	20th Anniversary Edition	Digital download; streaming	Universal Music Group	
