= Fear of Flying Tour =

2001 concert tour by Mýa

- Tour by Mýa
- Associated album: Fear of Flying
- Start date: March 21, 2001
- End date: May 4, 2001
- Legs: 1
- No. of shows: 10 in North America
- Supporting acts: City High

Mýa concert chronology
- Fear of Flying (2001); Moodring Tour (2003)

The Fear of Flying Tour was the debut concert tour by American recording artist Mýa. Her first headlining tour, it was launched in support of her second studio album, Fear of Flying (2000). A relatively short tour, Mya embarked on a ten-day nationwide concert tour across North America. The trek, beginning March 21, 2001, set list mainly drew from her second album, Fear of Flying as well as included songs from her eponymous debut album Mya (1998) and concluded April 1, 2001.

== Background ==
Released April 2000, Fear of Flying was Harrison's second studio effort. Upon release, Fear of Flying had received mixed reviews from music critics and initially stalled on the charts. The album's second single, "Case of the Ex" became a breakthrough chart success both stateside and worldwide and in turned solidified Fear of Flying as a hit album. A multiplatinum success, Fear of Flying subsequently earned a platinum plaque from RIAA. In March 2001, her record label Interscope had announced Mýa would start her own headlining tour to further support her second studio album, Fear of Flying. Prior to the tour, Harrison had served as an opening act for Montell Jordan on his European tour in Germany.

== Critical reception ==
Reviewing for SunFest, music writer Charles Passey commended the singer's performance at the festival. He expressed approval of her artistry to "offer a musical menu both bouncy and unpretentious" and felt "unlike a lot of female pop stars these days, she's got a voice to go along with her moves."

== Opening act ==
City High (select dates)

== Broadcasting and recording ==
Her show at the House of Blues in Los Angeles was featured on House of Blues Online Web cast on April 17 and April 26. Beginning, April 17, 2001 at 12 p.m. PDT online viewers had the opportunity to stream the 24-hour video Web cast performance via hob.com.

== Setlist ==
The following setlist was obtained from the concert held on March 28, 2001, at the Royal Oak Music Theatre in Royal Oak, Michigan. It does not represent all concerts for the duration of the tour.

1. "The Best of Me"
2. "Pussycats"
3. "We're Gonna Make Ya Dance"
4. "How You Gonna Tell Me"
5. "Ride & Shake"
6. "It's All About Me"
7. "Miss You Much"
8. "Ghetto Supastar (That Is What You Are)" / "Free"
9. "Can't Believe"
10. "My First Night with You"
  Encore
11. "Movin' On"
12. "Case of the Ex"

== Shows ==
Date	City	Country	Venue
North America
March 21, 2001	Los Angeles	United States	House of Blues
March 22, 2001	Anaheim	United States	House of Blues
March 23, 2001	Las Vegas	United States	House of Blues
March 25, 2001	Denver	United States	Paramount Theatre
March 27, 2001	Chicago	United States	House of Blues
March 28, 2001	Royal Oak	United States	Royal Oak Music Theatre
March 30, 2001	North Myrtle Beach	United States	House of Blues
March 31, 2001 (Note: Cancelled.)	Lake Buena Vista	United States	House of Blues
April 1, 2001	Atlanta	United States	Center Stage Theater
May 4, 2001^{A}	West Palm Beach	United States	SunFest

Festivals and other miscellaneous performances
^{A} This concert was a part of "SunFest."
