= Lock U Down =

Single by Mýa featuring Lil Wayne

from the album Liberation
- Released: March 3, 2007
- Length: 3:34
- Label: Universal Motown
- Songwriters: Jason Boyd; Dwayne Carter; Mya Harrison; Scott Storch
- Producer: Scott Storch

Mýa singles chronology
"Ayo!" (2006)	"Lock U Down" (2007)	"Ridin'" (2007)

Lil Wayne singles chronology
"You Ain't Know" (2007)	"Lock U Down" (2007)	"Speaker/9mm" (2007)

"Lock U Down" is a song by American singer Mýa on her fourth studio album Liberation (2007). It was written by Harrison along with Jason Boyd, Dwayne Carter, and Scott Storch, with production handled by the latter, and featured Young Money rapper Lil Wayne. The song was released as the album's official leading single after "Ayo!" failed to find success on the charts or at radio and eventually deemed a promotional single only. The lyrics of the R&B-collaboration speak of a woman locking her man down when she has found the right one.

The song received generally mixed reviews from contemporary music critics, who found that "Lock U Down" sounded dated and a poor choice as a single. The song was a commercial disappointment, it failed to chart on Billboard's Hot R&B/Hip-Hop Songs chart; peaking below the chart at number one hundred and number one on the Bubbling Under R&B/Hip-Hop Songs chart only. The song's accompanying music video was filmed by director Benny Boom. It featured Harrison and Lil Wayne in abandon warehouse. The video made its world premiere on BET’s 106 & Park on April 25, 2007.

== Background ==
Co-written by Mýa and produced by Scott Storch, "Lock U Down" featuring Lil Wayne mixes a prominent Eastern harp sample with a guitar riff. A street-but-sweet hip-hop soul jam, it exposes what kind of man a woman wants and needs. Following the commercial disappointment of "Ayo!," Universal Motown delayed Liberation's release. Initially, "Lock U Down" leaked in late December 2006.

== Critical reception ==
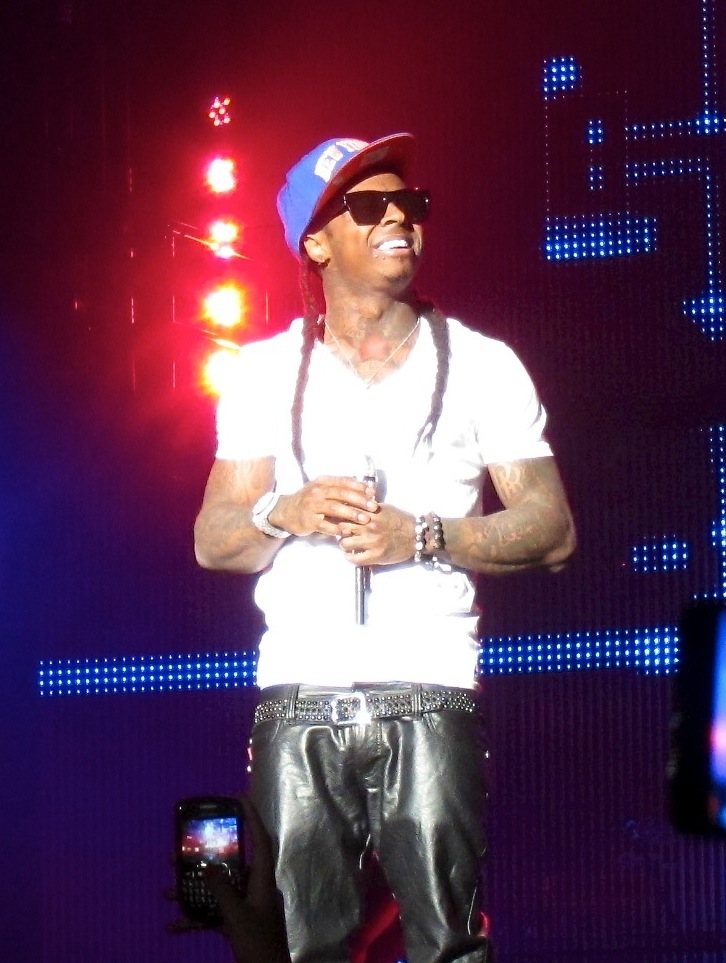
Lil Wayne (pictured) is featured on the single.

Upon release "Lock U Down" garnered "mixed" reviews from music critics. Previewed by back in July 2006, the Miami Herald praised "Lock U Down," and described the song as "genius" while commenting,"a rippling rhythm that shows off the rich tones of the underrated singer's voice, with a Middle Eastern counter melody." Writing for Sentinel, editor Brandon Brooks gave "Lock U Down" a favorable review. Brooks deemed "Lock U Down" a sure fire hit; while complimenting on Harrison's vocal performance noting, "She has grown up over the years and sound rejuvenated than ever before." The Guardian's Rosie Swash dismissed Lock U Down as a "basic but generally likeable song."

== Music video ==
On April 24, 2007, a day prior to the video's official release, Universal Motown uploaded a 27-minute video teaser. The Benny Boom-directed music video for the track was premiered on 106 & Park on April 25, 2007. The heavy dance-laid video includes Mýa dancing in a seemingly abandoned warehouse. Mýa performs a dance routine with a few back-up dancers during the video. Lil Wayne stands next to Mýa when rapping his verses, and Mýa is sometimes seen mouthing the words to his rap. Towards the end of the video, Mýa is seen partying with a couple of friends.

== Track listing ==
US 12" single
No.	Title	Length
1.	"Lock U Down" (Clean)	3:34
2.	"Lock U Down" (Instrumental)	3:34
3.	"Lock U Down" (Main)	3:34
4.	"Lock U Down" (A cappella)	3:28

== Credits and personnel ==
Credits lifted from the liner notes of Liberation.

- Wayne "The Brain" Allison – recording engineer
- Jason "Poo Bear" Boyd – writer
- Dwayne "Lil Wayne" Carter – vocalist, writer
- Vadim "Chise" Chislov – recording engineer assistance
- Aaron "Franchise" Fishbein – guitar
- Conrad Golding – recording engineer
- Suha Gur – mastering engineer
- Mya Harrison – vocalist, writer
- Fabian Marasciullo – mixing engineer
- Scott Storch – producer, writer

== Charts ==
=== Weekly charts ===
Weekly chart performance
Chart (2007)	Peak position
Germany (Deutsche Urban Charts)	9
US Bubbling Under R&B/Hip-Hop Songs (Billboard)	1

=== Year-end charts ===
Year-end chart performance
Chart (2007)	Position
Germany (Deutsche Urban Charts)	64

== Release history ==
Release dates and formats
Region	Date	Format	Label	Ref.
United States	March 6, 2007	Rhythmic contemporary radio	Universal Motown	
United States	March 27, 2007	Digital download	Universal Motown	
