= Vibe Vixen =

American women's magazine

March 2012 digital issue cover

Vibe Vixen is a magazine geared towards female readers of Vibe Magazine that covered fashion, beauty, dating, entertainment, sex, and societal issues for "urban minded females". The magazine was initially released in fall of 2004 and sales were considered successful enough for the magazine to be issued on a quarterly basis. The magazine went online in April 2013 and publishes regular content.

Stars who graced Vibe Vixen's covers included Ciara, Tracee Ellis Ross, Kimora Lee Simmons, Ariana Grande, Serena Williams, Kelis, and Wendy Williams.
