= MTV Beach House =

Television series

MTV Beach House was a one-hour music video block that first aired in 1993. The first year was hosted by comedian Bill Bellamy, and the following years were hosted by Carson Daly.

In June 2017, MTV confirmed Beach House would be rebooting later that month with Teen Wolf actor Cody Christian, Girl Code actor Nessa, and Chico Bean of Wild 'n Out set to host the show.
