= Fallen (Mya song) =

Single by Mya

from the album Moodring
- Released: November 3, 2003
- Studio: The Record Plant (Hollywood, California); Interscope (Santa Monica, California)
- Genre: R&B
- Length: 3:34
- Label: Interscope
- Songwriters: Luiz Bonfá; Maria Toledo; Leonard "Hugg" Huggins; Richard Shelton; Loren Hill; Kevin Veney
- Producers: Rich Shelton; Loren Hill; Kevin Veney; Ron Fair

Mya singles chronology
"My Love Is Like...Wo" (2003)	"Fallen" (2003)	"Ayo!" (2006)

Music video
- "Fallen" on YouTube

"Fallen" is a song by American singer Mya, released as the second and final single from her third studio album, Moodring (2003). Written by Rich Shelton, Kevin Veney, Loren Hill, and Leonard Huggins, the mid-tempo track contains excerpts from The Pharcyde's 1995 song "Runnin'", which itself samples Luiz Bonfá's 1963 song "Saudade Vem Correndo", and lyrically addresses a woman falling head over heels in love with someone.

Despite generally positive reviews from contemporary music critics, who complimented Mya's voice and the song's arrangements, "Fallen" underperformed on the Billboard Hot 100, where it spent two non-consecutive weeks at its peak of number 51. It fared better on Billboard's Hot R&B/Hip-Hop Songs chart, reaching number thirty-five. Due to its lackluster chart performance stateside, the single was not released internationally. "Fallen" remains Mya's last single to chart on the Hot 100, as well as her final single released under Interscope Records.

The song's accompanying music video, directed by Darren Grant and filmed in Toronto, featured Mýa stalking a potential lover. The video made its world premiere on BET's Access Granted in October 2003. "Fallen" and its Zone 4 remix featuring rapper Chingy were included on the soundtrack to the 2004 films A Cinderella Story and Barbershop 2: Back in Business, respectively.

== Composition ==
Written and produced by production team One Up Entertainment, "Fallen" is a titillating mid-tempo jeep-banger which cleverly interpolates the Pharcyde's "Runnin'." It is performed in the key of F minor and set at a moderate beat at 94 beats per minute in common time.

== Critical reception ==
Fallen Zone 4 remix was featured on The Village Voice's Pazz & Jop end of the year critics list.

== Commercial performance ==
"Fallen" debuted at number sixty-eight on the Billboard Hot 100 on the issue dated November 29, 2003 and reached its peak position of number fifty-one six weeks later, on the chart dated January 10, 2004. It spent a total of twelve consecutive weeks on the chart, and despite being Mýa's highest debut on the Hot 100, it is her third single to miss the top forty and the shortest-running single of her career to date. "Fallen" performed better on the Hot R&B/Hip-Hop Songs chart; it debuted at number seventy-four for the week of November 8, 2003, before peaking at number thirty-five on December 26, 2003, becoming Mýa's seventh non-consecutive top forty solo hit on the R&B chart.

== Music video ==
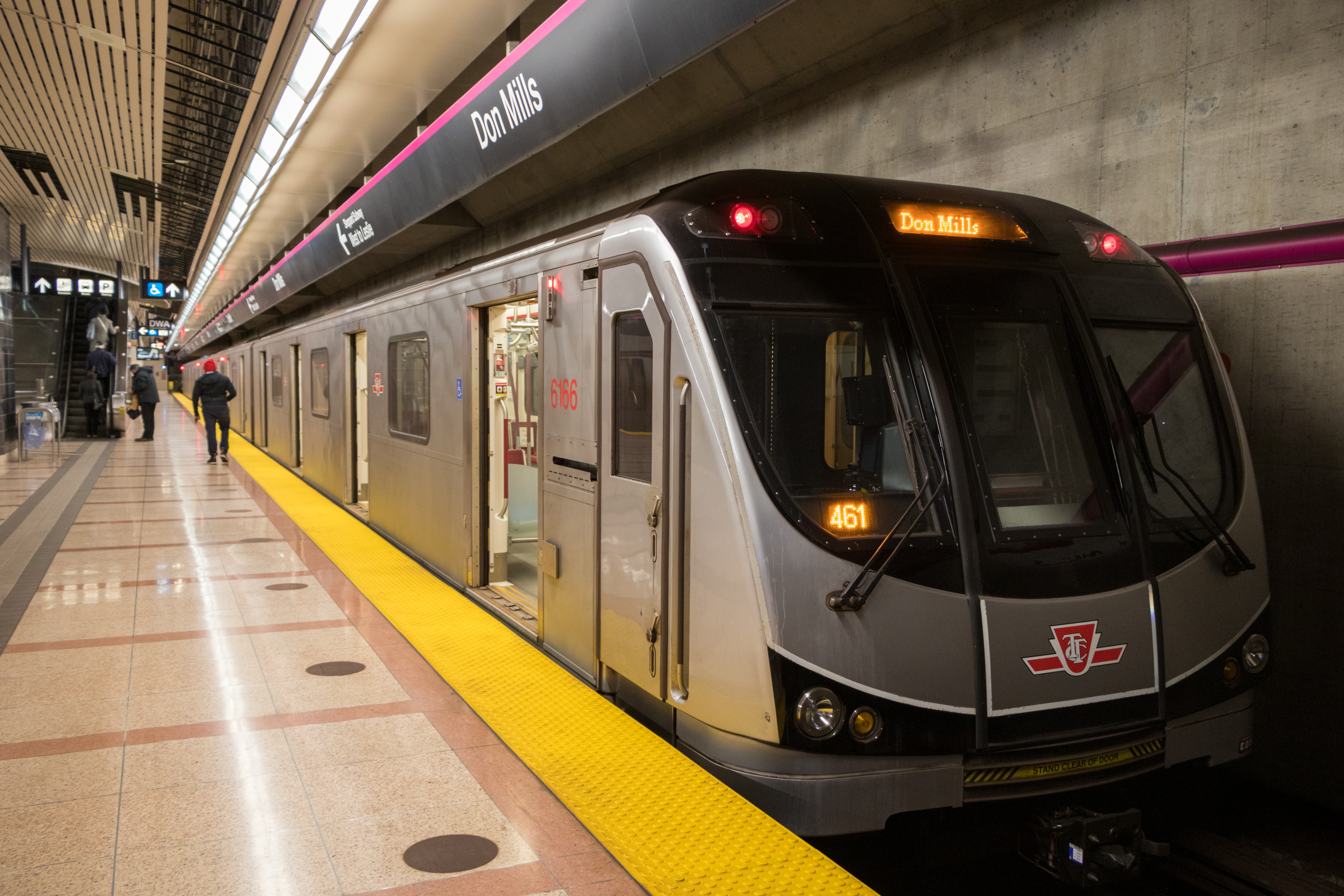
Scenes for the music video of "Fallen" were filmed at the Line 4 Sheppard subway line in Toronto.

A music video for "Fallen" was directed by Darren Grant. Shot in Toronto, the crew used the TTC subway as a backdrop for New York City. The concept behind the video was an idea Mýa had of stalking a potential lover, played by actor Hassan Johnson. The singer wrote the treatment for the video and pitched the idea around to different music video directors; Grant reached out to her and shared the same vision. Filming of the video was tracked by BET's Access Granted. "Fallen" made its world premiere on BET's Access Granted and 106 & Park on October 10, 2003 to coincide with Mýa's birthday.

== Live performances ==
October 17, 2003, she performed the song on The Ellen DeGeneres Show. Mýa performed a medley of "Fallen" and "My Love Is Like...Wo" at The GQ Men of the Year Awards at The Regent Hotel on October 21, 2003. In November 2003, Mya performed "Fallen" at the 77th Annual Macy's Thanksgiving Day Parade. In December, she performed "Fallen" on CBS fifth annual holiday special A Home For the Holidays.

== Accolades ==
Year	Ceremony	Award	Result	Ref.
2004	Music Video Production Awards	Best R&B Video	Nominated	

== Track listings ==
US CD single
No.	Title	Writer(s)	Producer(s)	Length
1.	"Fallen" (Radio Edit)	Luiz Bonfá; Maria Toledo; Leonard "Hugg" Huggins; Richard Shelton; Loren Hill; Kevin Veney	Shelton; Hill; Veney; Fair	3:21
2.	"Fallen" (The Remix Original featuring Tre and Fatlip)	Bonfá; Toledo; Huggins; Shelton; Hill; Veney; Derrick Stewart; Trevant Hardson	Shelton; Hill; Veney; Fair^{[a]}	4:00
3.	"Fallen" (The Remix Plus featuring Tre and Fatlip)	Bonfá; Toledo; Huggins; Shelton; Hill; Veney; Stewart; Hardson	Shelton; Hill; Veney; Fair^{[a]}	4:00
4.	"Fallen" (Video Edit)	Bonfá; Toledo; Huggins; Shelton; Hill; Veney	Shelton; Hill; Veney; Fair	4:05
5.	"Fallen" (Video)

US promotional 12-inch single
No.	Title	Writer(s)	Producer(s)	Length
1.	"Fallen" (The Remix Plus featuring Tre and Fatlip)	Bonfá; Toledo; Huggins; Shelton; Hill; Veney; Stewart; Hardson	Shelton; Hill; Veney; Fair^{[a]}	4:00
2.	"Fallen" (Radio Mix)	Bonfá; Toledo; Huggins; Shelton; Hill; Veney	Shelton; Hill; Veney; Fair	3:21
3.	"Fallen" (The Remix Original featuring Tre and Fatlip)	Bonfá; Toledo; Huggins; Shelton; Hill; Veney; Stewart; Hardson	Shelton; Hill; Veney; Fair^{[a]}	4:00
4.	"Fallen" (The Remix Instrumental)	Bonfá; Toledo; Huggins; Shelton; Hill; Veney	Shelton; Hill; Veney; Fair^{[a]}	3:21

Zone 4 Remix single
No.	Title	Writer(s)	Producer(s)	Length
1.	"Fallen" (Zone 4 Remix featuring Chingy)	Bonfá; Toledo; Huggins; Shelton; Hill; Veney; Howard Bailey, Jr.	Shelton; Hill; Veney; Fair; Polow da Don^{[a]}	3:16

Notes

- ^{^[a]} denotes additional remix producer

Sample credits

- "Fallen" contains an excerpts from the composition "Saudade vem correndo" (1963) as performed by Stan Getz and written by Maria Toledo and Luiz Bonfá.

== Credits and personnel ==
Credits adapted from the liner notes of Moodring.

=== Recording ===
- Recorded at The Record Plant (Hollywood, California) and Interscope Studios (Santa Monica, California)
- Mixed at Enterprise Studios (Burbank, California)
- Mastered at Oasis Mastering (Studio City, California)

=== Personnel ===
- Mýa – vocals
- Rich Shelton – production
- Loren Hill – production
- Kevin Veney – production
- Ron Fair – production, string arrangements, string conducting
- Frank Wolf – string recording
- Michael Valerio – bass
- Luis Conte – percussion
- Tal Herzberg – Pro Tools engineering
- Dave "Hard Drive" Pensado – mixing
- Ethan Willoughby – mix engineering assistance
- Eddy Schreyer – mastering

== Charts ==
Weekly chart performance
Chart (2003)	Peak position
US Billboard Hot 100	51
US Hot R&B/Hip-Hop Songs (Billboard)	35
US Pop Airplay (Billboard)	35
US Rhythmic Airplay (Billboard)	18

== Release history ==
Release dates and formats for "Fallen"
Region	Date	Format	Label	Ref.
United States	November 3, 2003	Rhythmic contemporary radio	Interscope	
United States	November 3, 2003	Urban contemporary radio	Interscope	
United States	November 11, 2003	CD single; digital download	Interscope	
