= My Love Is Like...Wo =

2003 single by Mýa

Single by Mýa

from the album Moodring
- Released: June 9, 2003
- Studio: The Record Plant (Hollywood, California); Interscope (Santa Monica, California)
- Length: 3:29
- Label: Interscope
- Songwriters: Missy Elliott; Charles Bereal; Kenneth Bereal
- Producer: Missy Elliott

Mýa singles chronology
"Lady Marmalade" (2001)	"My Love Is Like...Wo" (2003)	"Fallen" (2003)

Music video
- "My Love Is Like...Wo" on YouTube

"My Love Is Like...Wo" is a song by American singer Mýa, released as the lead single from her third studio album, Moodring (2003), on June 9, 2003. Mýa re-teamed up with rapper Missy Elliott after the global success of "Lady Marmalade" (2001) to record the song. Before being released, it took Mýa a whole year to decide to record the song because of its graphic lyrical content. The song was written by Elliott along with brothers Charles and Kenneth Bereal. Lyrically, the mid-tempo song is about self-love.

The song received generally mixed to positive reviews from contemporary music critics, applauding Mýa for her newfound sexual freedom. "My Love Is Like...Wo" became a top-20 hit on the Billboard Hot 100 for week of September 6, 2003, peaking and spending four consecutive weeks at number 13. It performed similarly on Billboard's Hot R&B/Hip-Hop Singles & Tracks chart, where it peaked at number 17. Internationally, the single charted within the top 40 in Australia, Ireland, New Zealand, and the United Kingdom.

The song's accompanying music video was filmed by director Paul Hunter, who envisioned Harrison to perform a one-woman show. The video earned her two nominations at the 2003 MTV Video Music Awards for Best Dance Video and Best Choreography, while choreographer Travis Payne garnered a nomination at the American Choreography Awards for Outstanding Achievement – Music Video.

== Background ==
"My Love Is Like...Wo" was written and produced by American rapper Missy Elliott along with production duo CKB, consisting of brothers Charles and Kenneth Bereal. Additional production on the song was handled by Ron Fair. Before Mýa Harrison decided to release "My Love Is...Wo" as the first single from Moodring (2003), she admitted she was not always comfortable with the song and its graphic lyric content. Speaking to Billboard magazine, she explained, "Back then, I wasn't so confident in saying, 'My a** is like wo' [...] I was coming out of doing a program with young girls that talked about self-esteem and body image. I realized that I really couldn't worry about what people think of me. I'm at that point in my life now where I can say, 'My ass is like wo.' I wasn't even considering the song to be on the album at that time, but I later fought for it to be the single." She further called My "Love Is Like...Wo" a "very conceited song, and I love it. It's about self-love and feeling confident, and it's a little cocky and aggressive."

== Composition ==
"My Love Is Like...Wo" is a mid-tempo song composed in the key of G major. The song's tempo is set a slow moderate sixty-nine beats per minute in common time. Mýa's vocal range spans from G_{3} to D_{5}. The lyrics for "My Love Is Like...Wo" are composed in the traditional verse-chorus form. Mýa opens the song with brief spoken lyrics. She begins the first verse, followed by the chorus leading her into the second verse. The song continues to the bridge, chorus, then fades out with the piano and Missy chanting "Wo! Wo! Wo! Wo! Wo!".

== Critical reception ==
Billboard magazine gave "My Love Is Like...Wo" a positive review writing, "The doe-eyed girl next door is proving to be quite a versatile performer, with a decidedly vampish performance in the movie Chicago and new imaging that redresses Mýa as a sexy and certain young woman. The first single from forthcoming Moodring [...] is a playfully coy call to arms for the singer's more tactile attributes, from her love, her kiss, and her touch to her sex, ass, and body—all of which 'are like wo.' Get it? An appropriately hip-swaying beat swirls around the vocal, courtesy of ever-hitworthy producer Missy Elliott. This is the record that will propel Mýa to the A-list among today's pop/R&B icons; throughout the song, she delivers womanly strength and sass with a knowing wink. Moodring sounds like a perfect fit." In their review Music Week noted that Mýa "has not so far matched her US success over here", but was hopeful that would change due the songs growing support on MTV Base and Galaxy.

== Awards and accolades ==
Awards for ""My Love Is Like...Wo"
Year	Ceremony	Award	Result	Ref.
2003	MTV Video Music Awards	Best Dance Video	Nominated	
2003	MTV Video Music Awards	Best Choreography	Nominated	
2004	Music Video Production Awards	Best R&B Video	Nominated	
2004	Music Video Production Awards	Best Choreography	Nominated	

Accolades for ""My Love Is Like...Wo"
Year	Publication	Accolade	Rank	Ref.
2003	MTV	Top 40 of 2003	38	
2017	Liveabout.com	The 100 Best Pop Songs of 2003	52	
2023	Billboard	The 100 Greatest Songs of 2003: Staff Picks	89	

== Commercial performance ==
In the United States, "My Love Is Like...Wo" debuted on the Billboard Hot 100 at number 81 on the issue dated June 28, 2003. The song reached its peak position of number 13 on the chart dated September 6, 2003, spending four consecutive weeks at its peak. It spent 20 consecutive weeks altogether on the chart and became Mýa's fifth non-consecutive top 40 solo hit on that chart. On Billboard's Hot R&B/Hip-Hop Singles & Tracks chart, the single debuted at number 62 on June 21, 2003, peaking at number 17 on August 23, 2003. It spent a total of 19 consecutive weeks on the chart and became Mýa's sixth non-consecutive top 40 solo hit on that chart.

Elsewhere, "My Love Is Like...Wo" became a modest hit. The single debuted and peaked at number 33 on the UK Singles Chart for the week of September 14, 2003, dropping to number 53 the following week before falling off the top 75. It debuted on the Irish Singles Chart at number 36 on September 11, 2003, and it remained on the chart for one week. In Australia, "My Love Is Like...Wo" debuted and peaked at number 25 on the ARIA Singles Chart during the week of September 1, 2003, spending three consecutive weeks at its peak position and 12 weeks in the top 50. The song debuted at number 49 in New Zealand for the week of September 21, 2003, peaking at number 33 six weeks later.

== Music video ==
The song's music video was featured on MTV's Making the Video. The video was filmed and directed by Paul Hunter, who had previously worked with Mýa on "Lady Marmalade" (2001) with Christina Aguilera, Pink, Lil' Kim, and Missy Elliott. His concept for the video was to have Mýa act as a one-woman show. Although this initially was not Mýa's vision or idea for the song's video, she reluctantly agreed to it. She envisioned a scenario, in which she and her crew of "pimped-out females," dress up a la the Nicholas Brothers, in tuxes, hold canes and smoke expensive cigars. Adding her own twist, Mýa also imagined them wearing fishnets and hot pants. She had pictured herself racily giving her male lead a "classy, Broadwayesque lapdance" to show him that her "love and ass is like WO!" However, she did voice her opinion in the styling of the video from the many different costumes changes. She came up with the ideas of the pimpstress and gangster look. In the video, Mýa smoked a cigar, then displayed her tap-dancing during the song's breakdown as well. The dance sequence in the video was choreographed by Travis Payne. The video was released on May 29, 2003.

== Live performances ==
Mýa made several television appearances to promote and perform "My Love Is Like...Wo." She premiered and performed the song on MTV Beach House during Spankin' New Music Week. On July 13, 2003, she performed "My Love Is Like...Wo" at MTV's Carson Daly Bash. She performed the song at Live! with Regis and Kelly on the release day of Moodring on July 22, 2003. On July 24, 2003, Mýa performed "My Love Is Like...Wo" on the NBC soap opera drama Passions. Mýa appeared on BET's 106 & Park and performed "My Love Is Like...Wo" again on July 25, 2003. On August 6, 2003, Mýa performed a medley of "My Love Is Like...Wo" and "Whatever Bitch" (a track from Moodring) on The WB's Pepsi Smash. During the performance breakdown of "Whatever Bitch", she vogued with drag queens.

== Remixes ==
"My Love Is Like...Wo" spawned several remixes, including two official sequel remixes. "Part II – My Love Is Like...Wo (Allstar Remix)" features additional production by Allen "Allstar" Gordon Jr. and contains an interpolation from Black Rob's 2000 song "Whoa!", written by Rob, Harve Pierre, and Buckwild and originally produced by the latter. Rapper John Doe contributed additional vocals to this version. "Part III – My Love Is Like...Wo (Swizz Mix)" was produced by Swizz Beatz, who recorded additional vocals with rapper Cassidy for the track. It contains an interpolation from Eve's song "Double R What", which appeared on her 2002 album Eve-Olution and was also produced by Swizz Beatz.

== Legacy ==
In her interview with Singersroom former Bad Boy signee turned indie recording artist Dawn Richard praised Mýa as a dancer and her "My Love Is Like...Wo" video, commenting, "That’s something I want people to see as an R&B artist, because you haven’t seen any R&B artist do that many techniques and styles since really, Mýa. She was tap dancing in one of her videos. She was one of the first artists to really push different styles of dance in her videos." Speaking on behalf of "My Love Is Like...Wo" and its video, she gushed, In “[My Love is Like] Whoa” she was tap dancing and she did a little bit of hip-hop, then there was jazz moments." Concluding, Mýa was "really pushing the bar." Australian singer Nicole Millar covered "My Love Is Like...Wo" with DJ/producer Zuri Akoko for their Covers EP (2015). Out of the three tracks they chose to cover, Nicole cited "My Love Is Like...Wo" as her favorite cover.

== Track listings ==
- US CD single
1. "My Love Is Like...Wo" – 3:29
2. "No Sleep Tonight" – 3:46
- US 12-inch single

A1. "My Love Is Like...Wo" (Main Mix) – 3:31
B1. "My Love Is Like...Wo" (Acapella) – 3:31
B2. "My Love Is Like...Wo" (Instrumental) – 3:29

- European CD single
1. "My Love Is Like...Wo" – 3:29
2. "Case of the Ex" – 3:55
- European CD maxi single
1. "My Love Is Like...Wo" – 3:29
2. "Case of the Ex" – 3:55
3. "Little Too Much, Little Too Late" – 3:24
4. "My Love Is Like...Wo" (Video)
- UK 12-inch single

A1. "My Love Is Like...Wo"
B1. "Part II – My Love Is Like...Wo" (Allstar Mix) (Main Pass)
B2. "Little Too Much, Little Too Late"

== Credits and personnel ==
Credits adapted from the liner notes of Moodring.

=== Recording ===
- Recorded at The Record Plant (Hollywood, California) and Interscope Studios (Santa Monica, California)
- Mixed at Enterprise Studios (Burbank, California)
- Mastered at Oasis Mastering (Studio City, California)

=== Personnel ===
- Mýa – vocals, vocal arrangement
- Missy Elliott – production, additional background vocals
- CKB – co-production
- Eric Dawkins – vocal arrangement
- Ron Fair – vocal arrangement, string arrangements, string conducting, additional production
- Sue Ann Carwell – additional background vocals
- Tal Herzberg – Pro Tools engineering
- Dave "Hard Drive" Pensado – mixing
- Ethan Willoughby – mix engineering assistance
- Eddy Schreyer – mastering

== Charts ==
=== Weekly charts ===
Weekly chart performance ""My Love Is Like...Wo"
Chart (2003)	Peak position
Australia (ARIA)	25
Australian Urban (ARIA)	23
Belgium (Ultratip Bubbling Under Flanders)	12
Belgium (Ultratip Bubbling Under Wallonia)	14
Germany (GfK)	73
Ireland (IRMA)	36
New Zealand (Recorded Music NZ)	33
Poland (PiF PaF)	20
Scotland Singles (Official Charts)	55
UK Singles (Official Charts)	33
UK Hip Hop/R&B (Official Charts)	9
US Billboard Hot 100	13
US Hot R&B/Hip-Hop Songs (Billboard)	17
US Pop Airplay (Billboard)	8
US Rhythmic Airplay (Billboard)	9

=== Year-end charts ===
Year-end chart performance ""My Love Is Like...Wo"
Chart (2003)	Position
UK Urban (Music Week)	11
US Billboard Hot 100	64
US Hot R&B/Hip-Hop Singles & Tracks (Billboard)	88
US Mainstream Top 40 (Billboard)	60
US Rhythmic Top 40 (Billboard)	30

== Release history ==
Release dates and formats ""My Love Is Like...Wo"
Region	Date	Format(s)	Label(s)	Ref.
United States	June 9, 2003	Rhythmic contemporary radio	A&M; Interscope	
United States	June 9, 2003	Urban radio	A&M; Interscope	
United States	July 28, 2003	Contemporary hit radio	A&M; Interscope	
Australia	August 25, 2003	CD	Interscope	
Germany	September 1, 2003	CD; maxi-CD	A&M	
United Kingdom	September 8, 2003	CD	Interscope	
