= Ayo! =

Promotional single by Mýa featuring DJ Kool

from the album Liberation (Canadian release)
- Released: September 26, 2006
- Genre: Hip hop; R&B
- Length: 3:50
- Label: Universal Motown
- Songwriters: John Bowman, Jr.; Mýa Harrison; Chris Henderson; Charlie Smalls
- Producer: Chris "Deep" Henderson

"Ayo!" is a song by American singer Mýa. It was written and composed by Mýa, DJ Kool and Christopher “Deep” Henderson and initially recorded for her fourth studio album Liberation (2007). Production on the track was helmed by Henderson, while Kool is having featured vocals. The song is built upon on an of interpolation from the composition "He's the Wizard" by American jazz singer Thelma Carpenter. Due to the inclusion of the sample, Charlie Smalls is also credited as a songwriter.

The song was expected to be released as the first single from Mýa's fourth studio album Liberation (2007). With the singer was going through transitioning from former label Interscope to her Universal Motown Records though, "Ayo!" was later demoted and replaced by Scott Storch-produced "Lock U Down," a collaboration with rapper Lil Wayne, as the album's leading single. Critics compared the song's production favorably to TLC’s 1990s album CrazySexyCool. On the charts, it "Ayo!" became a minor hit on Billboard's Hot R&B/Hip-Hop Songs chart, peaking at number seventy.

== Background ==
“Ayo!” was originally recorded by girl group 3LW, but was then passed to Mýa. The song was leaked in July 2006, unbeknownst if Universal Motown had chosen the song as the first single taken from the singer's next studio album Liberation. A few days later, online publication Rap-Up confirmed "Ayo!" as the first official single from the album'. Though the song was intended to be the first single from the project, Universal Motown eventually scrapped the single and delayed the album's release. Co-written by Mýa and produced by Chris "Deep" Henderson, the Go-go inspired track samples an interpolation from "He's the Wizard" by American singer Thelma Carpenter from the soundtrack to The Wiz, an adaptation of L. Frank Baum's The Wonderful Wizard of Oz which features an entire African American cast. "He's the Wizard" was originally written by Charlie Smalls for the musical and film, so therefore he is credited for the sample recording.

== Critical reception ==
Billboard magazine gave the song a positive review, writing, "Mýa has become the new captain of sexy, single ladies as she struts her way back into the spotlight. New single, "Ayo!" (pronounced "ee-yo"), featuring hip-hop veteran DJ Kool, is a party anthem that finds the sultry singer just "tryin' to enjoy herself," while hating on the men who can't keep her interest, satisfy or keep it real day-to-da. From the start, the beat takes charge, complemented by loud brassy horns and tight percussion; the hook is fresh, catchy and simplistic. "Ayo!" brings back a bit of old school, reminiscent of TLC's classic 1990s "CrazySexyCool," and leads independent women straight to the doors of the party. Look for her fourth full-length set, "Liberation" Nov. 14."

== Track listing ==
International single
No.	Title	Length
1.	"Ayo!" (Radio Edit featuring DJ Kool)	3:50
2.	"Ayo!" (W/O DJ Kool Radio Edit)	3:28

US 12" Single
No.	Title	Length
1.	"Ayo!" (Radio Edit featuring DJ Kool)	3:50
2.	"Ayo!" (W/O DJ Kool Radio Edit)	3:28
3.	"Ayo!" (Main featuring DJ Kool)	3:53
4.	"Ayo!" (Instrumental)	3:53
5.	"Ayo!" (Acappella featuring DJ Kool)	3:50
6.	"Ayo!" (Callout Hook)	0:10

== Credits and personnel ==
Credits lifted from the liner notes of "Ayo!."

- John Bowman, Jr. – writer
- Ralph Cacciurri – recording engineer
- Rick DeVarona – recording assistance
- Seth Foster – mastering engineer
- Serban Ghenea – mixing engineer
- Suha Gur – mastering engineer
- John Hanes – Pro Tools
- Mýa Harrison – vocalist, writer
- Christopger "Deep" Henderson – producer, writer
- Charlie Smalls – writer (sample)
- Tim Roberts – mixing assistance

== Charts ==
=== Weekly charts ===
Weekly chart performance
Chart (2006)	Peak position
Germany (Deutsche Urban Charts)	17
US Hot R&B/Hip-Hop Songs (Billboard)	70

=== Year-end charts ===
Year-end chart performance
Chart (2006)	Position
Germany (Deutsche Urban Charts)	139

== Release history ==
Release dates and formats for "Ayo!"
Region	Date	Format	Label	Ref.
United States	August 21, 2006	Rhythmic contemporary radio	Universal Motown	
United States	September 26, 2006	Digital download	Universal Motown	
