= Mya videography =

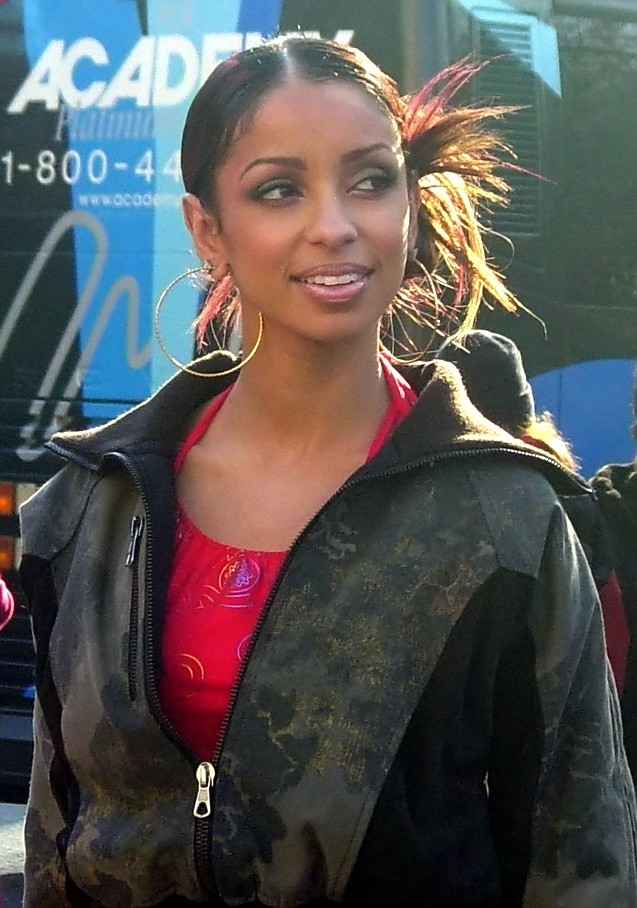
Mya at the 2003 Macy's Thanksgiving Day Parade in New York City

American recording artist Mya has appeared in fifty-five music videos; thirty-four as a lead artist, twelve as a featured artist and nine as a guest or cameo appearance. With her videogenic charm, right from beginning MTV embraced Mya and her music videos. Cynthia Fuchs of Popmatters noted in the singer's early videos: she wore modest costumes and looked polite, even demure.

In 1998, Mya released her debut single, "It's All About Me" from her eponymous debut album. A commercial success, the song's accompanying music video garnered her Billboard Video Music Award nomination for Best New R&B/Urban clip. Other music videos from the album included for the singles were "Movin' On" and "My First Night with You" in 1998 and 1999. The former, in retrospect by Complex magazine was touted as one of the Best R&B Videos of the 90s. While the latter featured guest appearances from actors Lawrence Hilton-Jacobs and Kathleen Bradley portraying Mya's parents. Rapper Saafir appeared as her love interest. "Ghetto Supastar (That Is What You Are)," a collaborative effort with rappers Pras and Ol' Dirty Bastard garnered two MTV Video Music Award nominations for Best Rap Video and Best Video from a Film.

In 2000, she released her sophomore album, Fear of Flying. It featured the singles; "The Best of Me," "Case of the Ex," and "Free." The music videos for "Case of the Ex" and "Free" won Best Choreography for Hip-hop music video at 2001 American Choreography Awards. The former has received relentless praise for its choreography. Aspects of the video have been emulated by singer Ciara for her music video "Got Me Good." "Lady Marmalade," her 2001 collaborative effort with Christina Aguilera, Lil' Kim, and Pink won the prestigious Video of the Year award at 2001 MTV Video Music Awards. Following a brief music hiatus, Mya returned in 2003 with her third studio album, Moodring. It spawned the singles, "My Love Is Like...Wo" and "Fallen." Directed by Paul Hunter and under Mya's creative vision, "My Love Is Like...Wo" received two nominations at the 2003 MTV Video Music Awards for Best Dance Video and Best Choreography in a video. For her solo performance in the "Love Lies" music video, singer Normani cited "My Love Is Like...Wo" music video as inspiration.

== Music videos ==
=== 1990s and 2000s ===
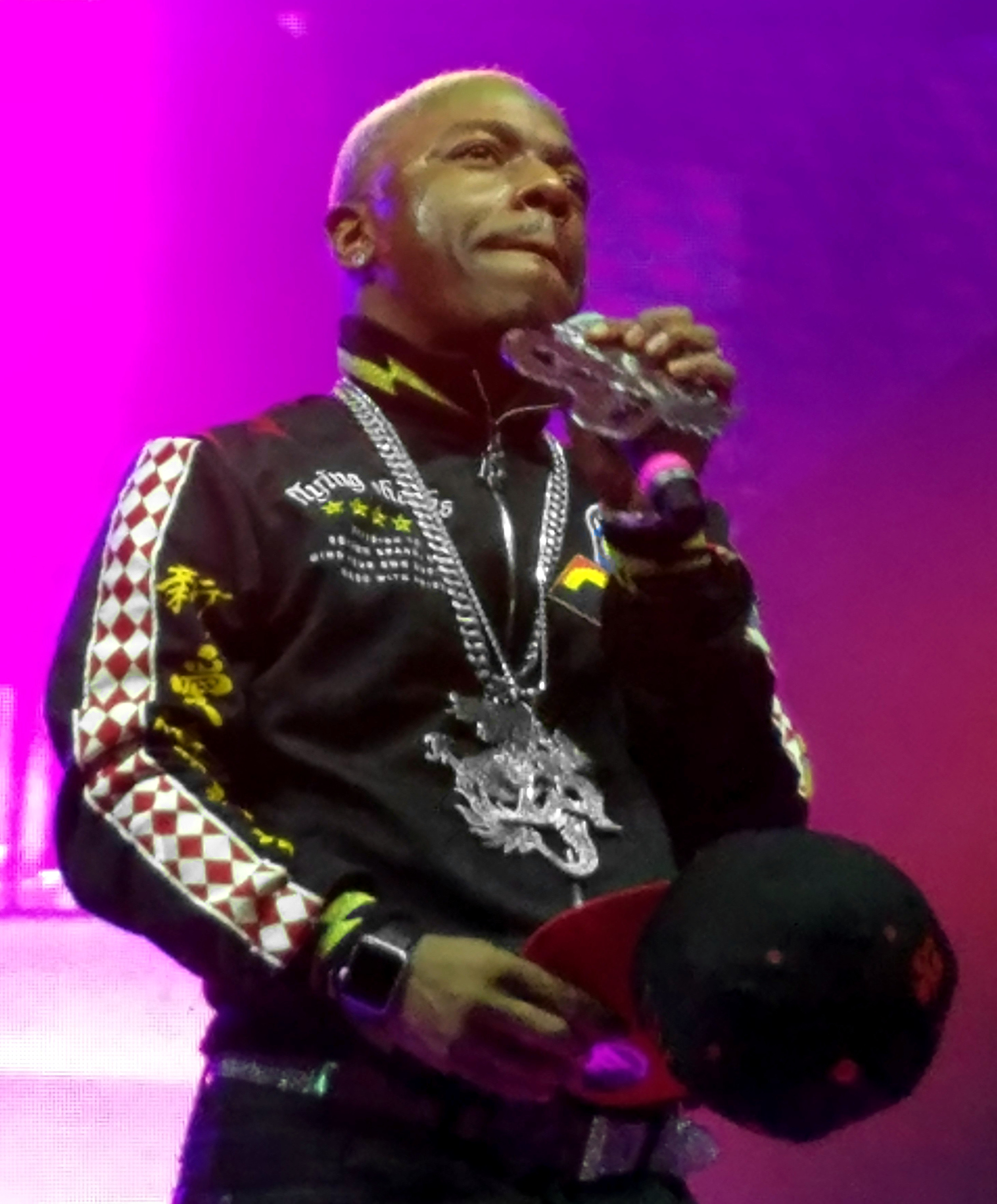
Harrison collaborated with Sisqo (pictured) on "It's All About Me."

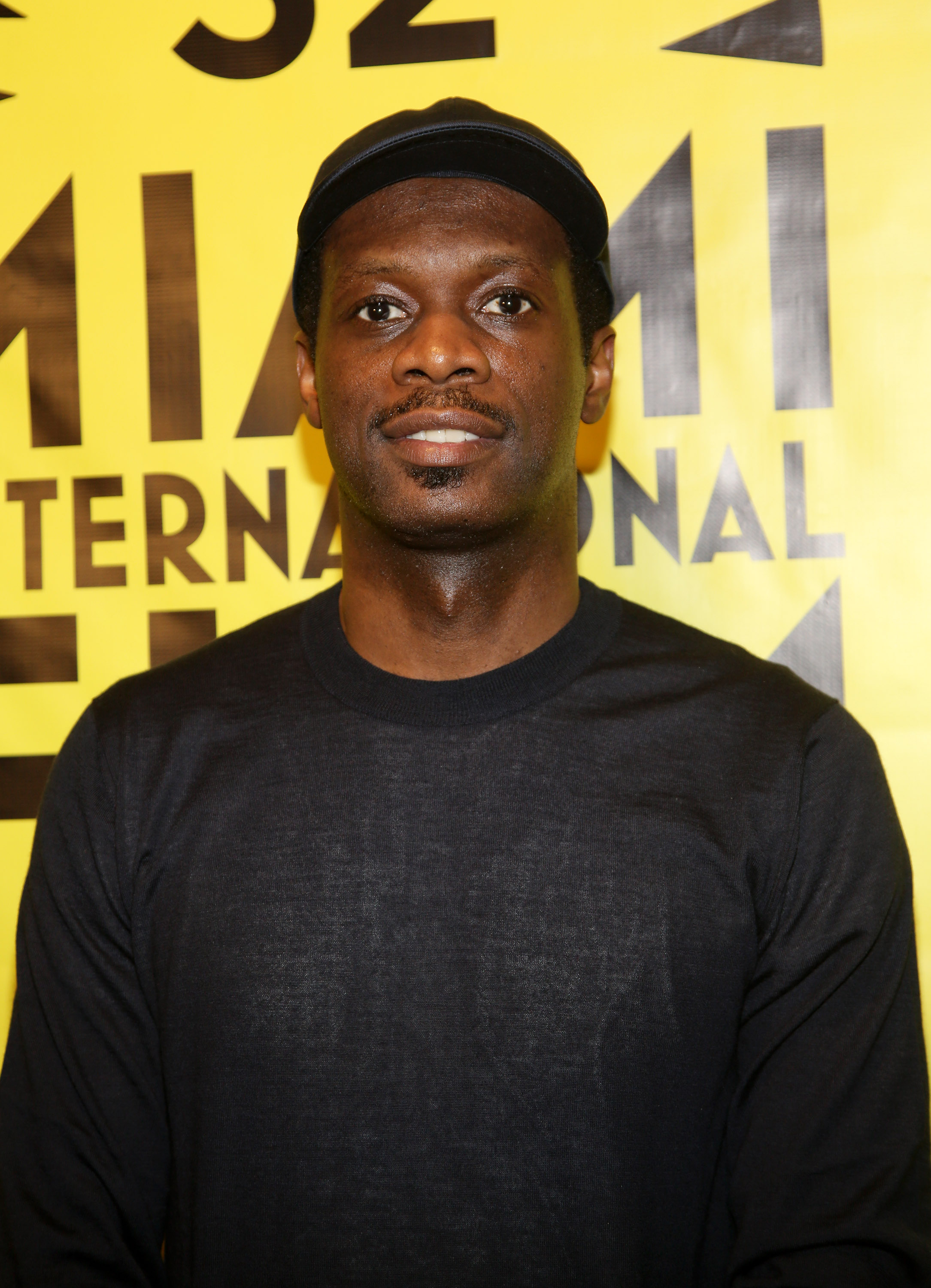
Mya collaborated with Pras (pictured) on "Ghetto Supastar (That Is What You Are)."

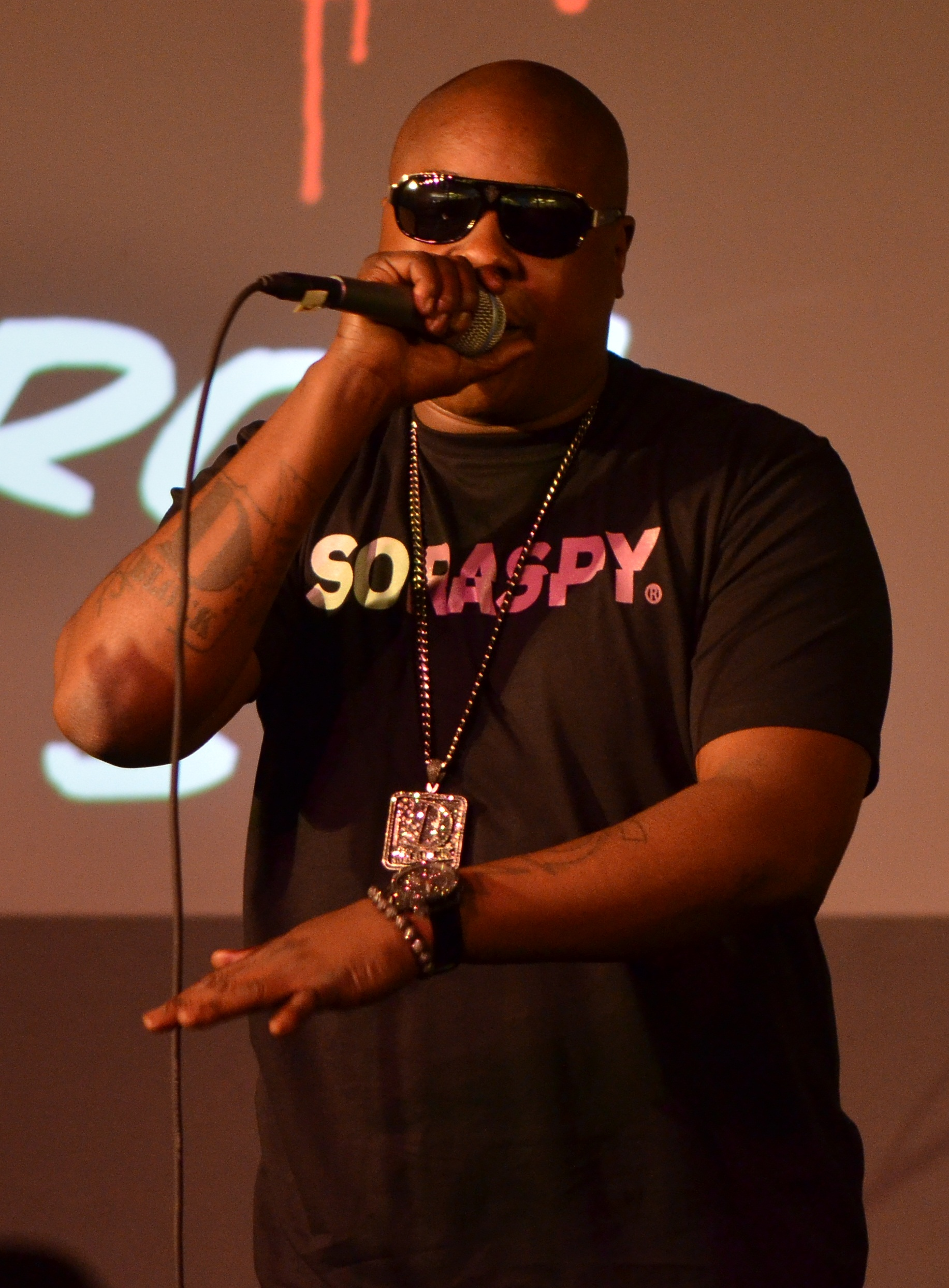
Harrison collaborated with Jadakiss (pictured) on "The Best of Me."

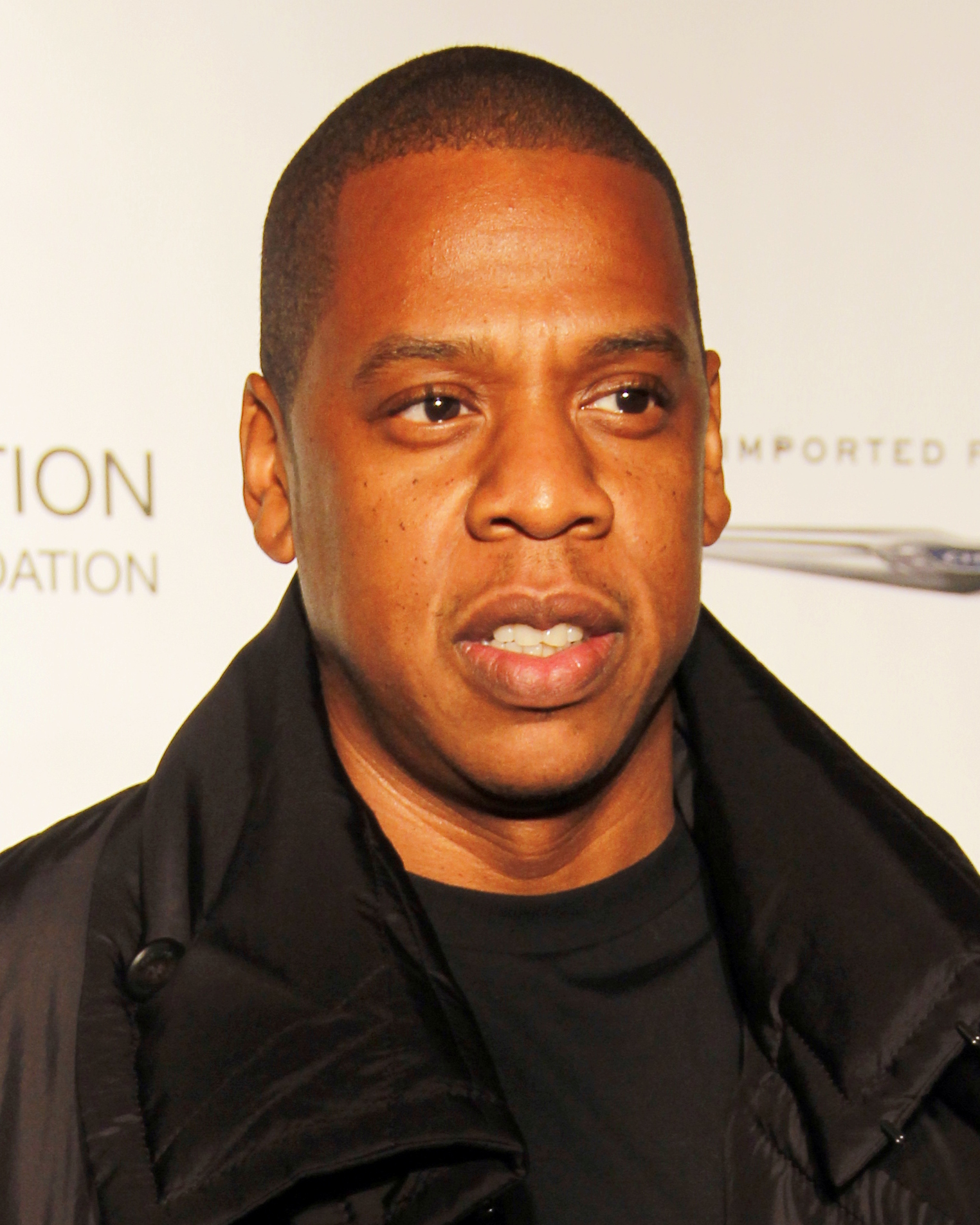
Harrison collaborated with Jay-Z (pictured) on "Best of Me, Part 2."

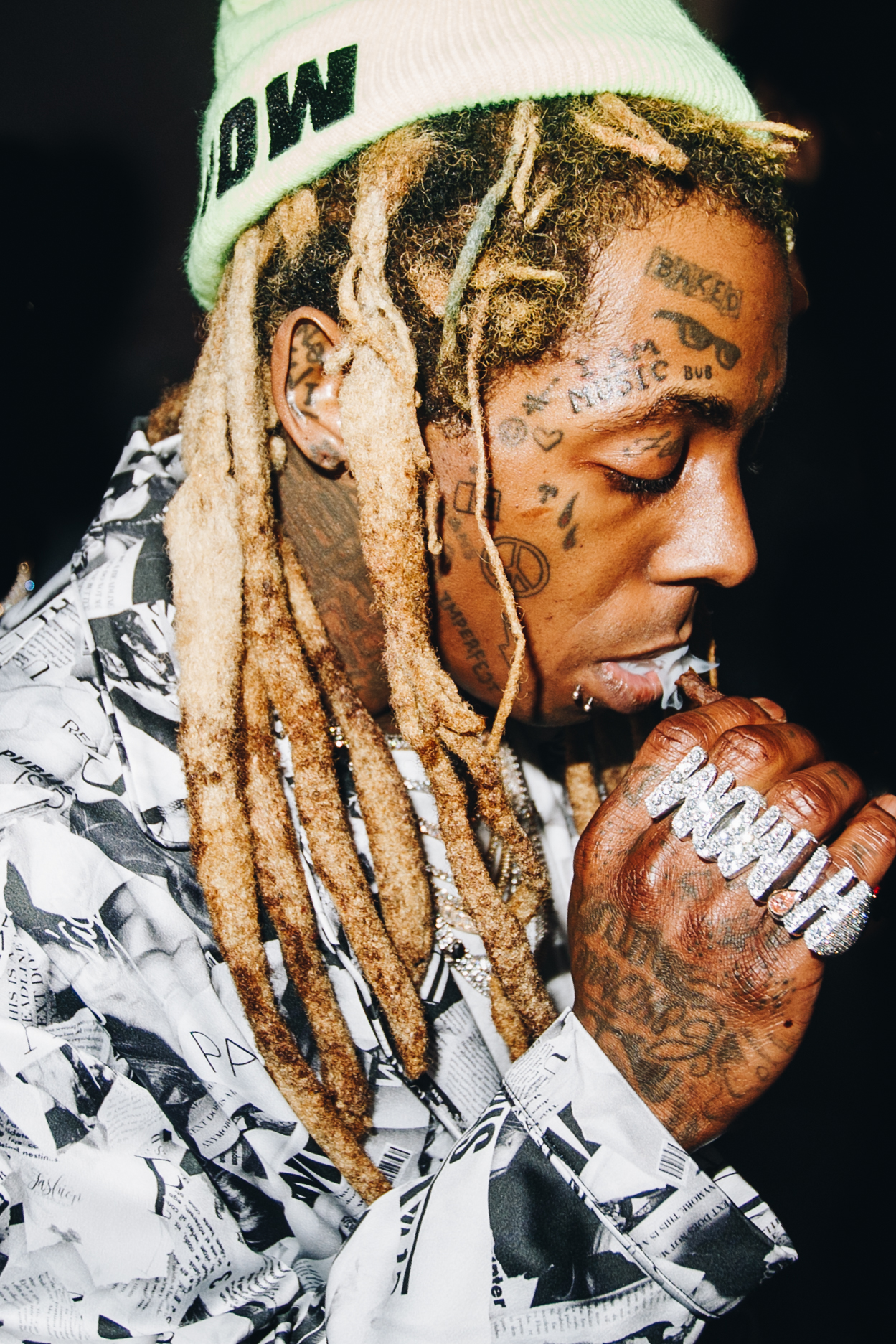
Mya collaborated with Lil Wayne (pictured) on "Lock U Down."

Key
•	Denotes music videos directed or co-directed by Mya

Year	Title	Other performer(s)	Director(s)	Associated album	Notes	Ref.
1997	"Big Bad Mama"	Foxy Brown	Hype Williams	Ill Na Na	Cameo	
1998	"It's All About Me"	Sisqó	G. Thomas Ferguson; A. Haqq Islam	Mýa		
1998	"Ghetto Supastar (That Is What You Are)"	Pras; Ol' Dirty Bastard	Francis Lawrence	Bulworth; Ghetto Supastar	Actress Halle Berry made a cameo appearance.	
1998	"Movin' On"	Silkk The Shocker	G. Thomas Ferguson; A. Haqq Islam	Mýa		
1998	"Take Me There"	BLACKstreet; Ma$e; Blinky Blink	Luke Nola; Steve Saussey	The Rugrats Movie; Finally		
1999	"Somebody Like Me"	Silkk The Shocker	Jesse Vaughan	Made Man		
1999	"My First Night with You"	—N/a	G. Thomas Ferguson; A. Haqq Islam	Mýa	Lawrence Hilton-Jacobs and Kathleen Bradley portrays Mya's parents. Saafir portrays her love interest.	
1999	"Movin' Out"	Noreaga; Raekwon	Hype Williams	Belly		
1999	"Thugz Cry"	Bizzy Bone	Chris Stokes	Heaven'z Movie	Cameo	
2000	"The Best of Me"	Jadakiss	Chris Robinson	Fear of Flying	Actress turned singer Christina Milian portrays one of Mya's on-screen friends.	
2000	"Best of Me, Part 2"	Jay-Z	Hype Williams	Backstage: Music Inspired by the Film		
2000	"Case of the Ex"	—N/a	Diane Martel	Fear of Flying		
2000	"Girls Dem Sugar"	Beenie Man	Little X	Art and Life		
2000	"Free"	—N/a	Dave Meyers	Bait; Fear of Flying		
2001	"All Or Nothing"	Athena Cage	Fatima Robinson	Music from the Motion Picture Save the Last Dance	Cameo	
2001	"Lady Marmalade"	Christina Aguilera; Lil' Kim; P!nk; Missy Elliott	Paul Hunter	Moulin Rouge! Music from Baz Luhrmann's Film		
2001	"Where the Dream Takes You"	—N/a	—N/a	Atlantis: The Lost Empire		
2003	"My Love Is Like...Wo"	—N/a	Paul Hunter	Moodring		
2003	"Fallen"	—N/a	Darren Grant	Moodring	Actor Hassan Johnson portrays Mya's love interest.	
2004	"The Set Up (You Don't Know)"	Obie Trice	Bryan Barber	Cheers	Mya made an appearance as Charming Lady	
2005	"Sugar Daddy"	Cuban Link	Louis Martinez	Chain Reaction		
2005	"Sunshine to the Rain"	Miri Ben-Ari; Anthony Hamilton; Scarface	Erik White	The Hip-Hop Violinist	Cameo	
2006	"Dreams"	The Game	Philip Atwell	The Documentary	Cameo	
2006	"No Matter What They Say"	Penelope Jones	—N/a	—N/a	Actor Lance Gross portrays Penelope Jones love interest.	
2007	"Lock U Down"	Lil Wayne	Benny Boom	Liberation		
2007	"Ridin'"	—N/a	Erik White	Liberation		
2007	"I Will Give It All To You"	Vlad Topalov	—N/a	—N/a		
2007	"The Party Roll"	Chuck Brown	—N/a	We're About the Business	Cameo	
2008	"Paradise"	—N/a	Marc Baptiste	Sugar & Spice		
2008	"Hi Hater (Remix)"	Maino; Plies; Fabolous; Swizz Beatz; Jadakiss; T.I.	—N/a	If Tomorrow Comes...	Cameo	
2008	"Tired"	Z-Ro	Mr.Boomtown	Crack		
2009	"Show Me Somethin'"	Bun B	Mr.Boomtown	Beauty & The Streets Vol.1		
2009	"Searchin' For Love"	Lil' Eddie	Lil' Eddie	City of My Heart		

=== 2010s ===
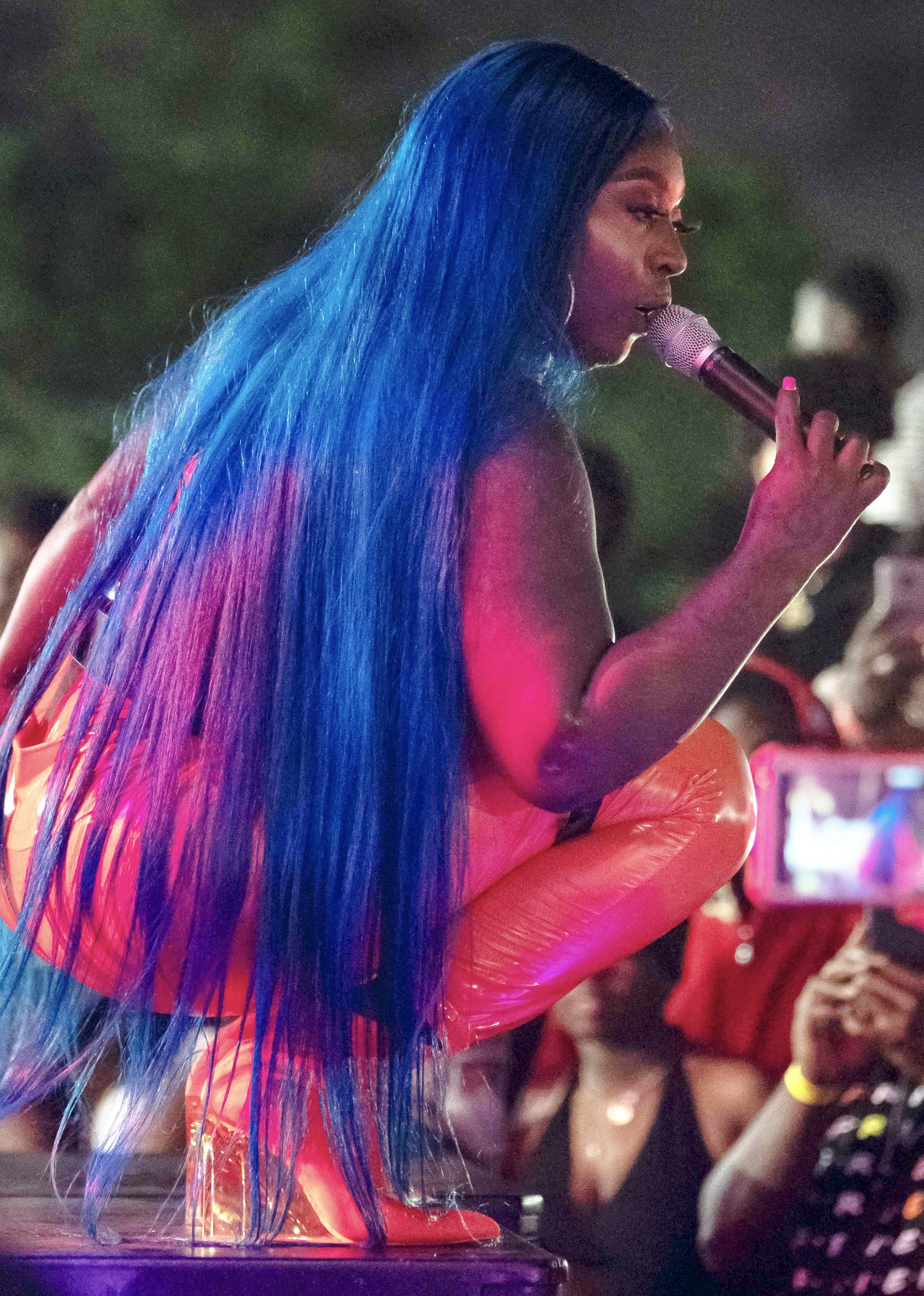
Mya collaborated with Spice (pictured) on "Take Him Out."

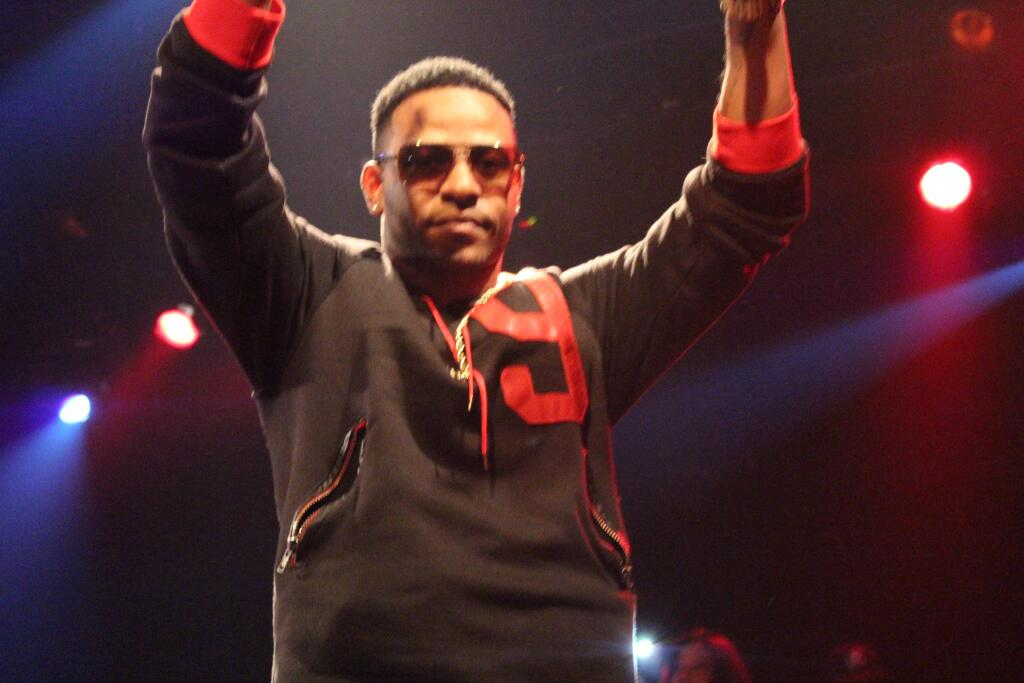
Harrison is featured in Eric Bellinger (pictured) music video "Focused On You" as his female lead.

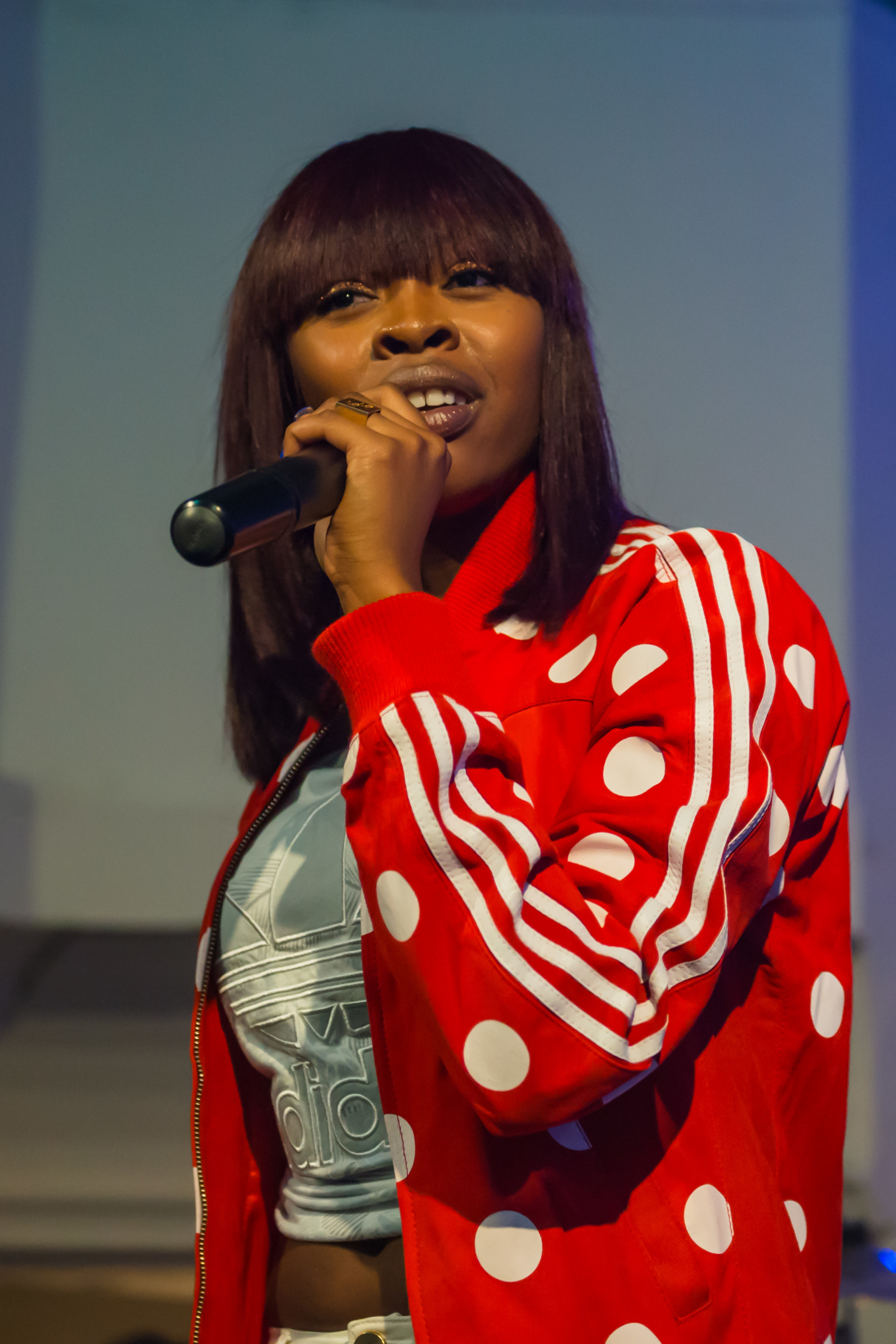
Mya collaborated with Tink (pictured) on "G.M.O. (Got My Own)."

Key
•	Denotes music videos directed or co-directed by Mya

Year	Title	Other performer(s)	Director(s)	Associated album	Notes	Ref.
2010	"We Are the World 25 for Haiti"	Artists for Haiti	Paul Haggis	—N/a		
2011	"Love Is the Answer"	Cedric Gervais	8112 Studios	Miamication; K.I.S.S. (Keep It Sexy & Simple)	Perez Hilton and La Coacha made cameo appearances.	
2012	"Take Him Out"	Spice	Ras Kassa	K.I.S.S. (Keep It Sexy & Simple)		
2012	"Mr. Incredible"	—N/a	Derek Brown	K.I.S.S. (Keep It Sexy & Simple)		
2015	"Focused On You"	Eric Bellinger; 2 Chainz	Daniel CZ	Cuffing Season	Mya portrays Eric Bellinger's love interest.	
2015	"Bum Bum"	Kevin Lyttle	—N/a	—N/a		
2017	"Coolin'"	—N/a	Matt Sharp	Smoove Jones		
2017	"Ready for Whatever"	—N/a	Dana Rice	T.K.O. (The Knock Out)	Singer-songwriter Kevin McCall portrays Mya's love interest.	
2018	"You Got Me"	—N/a	Josh Sikkema	T.K.O. (The Knock Out)		
2018	"Damage"	—N/a	Galen Hooks	T.K.O. (The Knock Out)		
2018	"G.M.O. (Got My Own)"	Tink	Dana Rice	—N/a		
2019	"With You"	MyGuyMars	Baxter Stapleton	T.K.O. (The Knock Out)		
2019	"Down"	—N/a	Josh Sikkema	T.K.O. (The Knock Out)		
2019	"Handsfree"	Ding Dong	Cinema Gods JA	Sexting Riddim		
2019	"Only You"	Jah Cure	—N/a	Royal Soldier		

=== 2020s ===
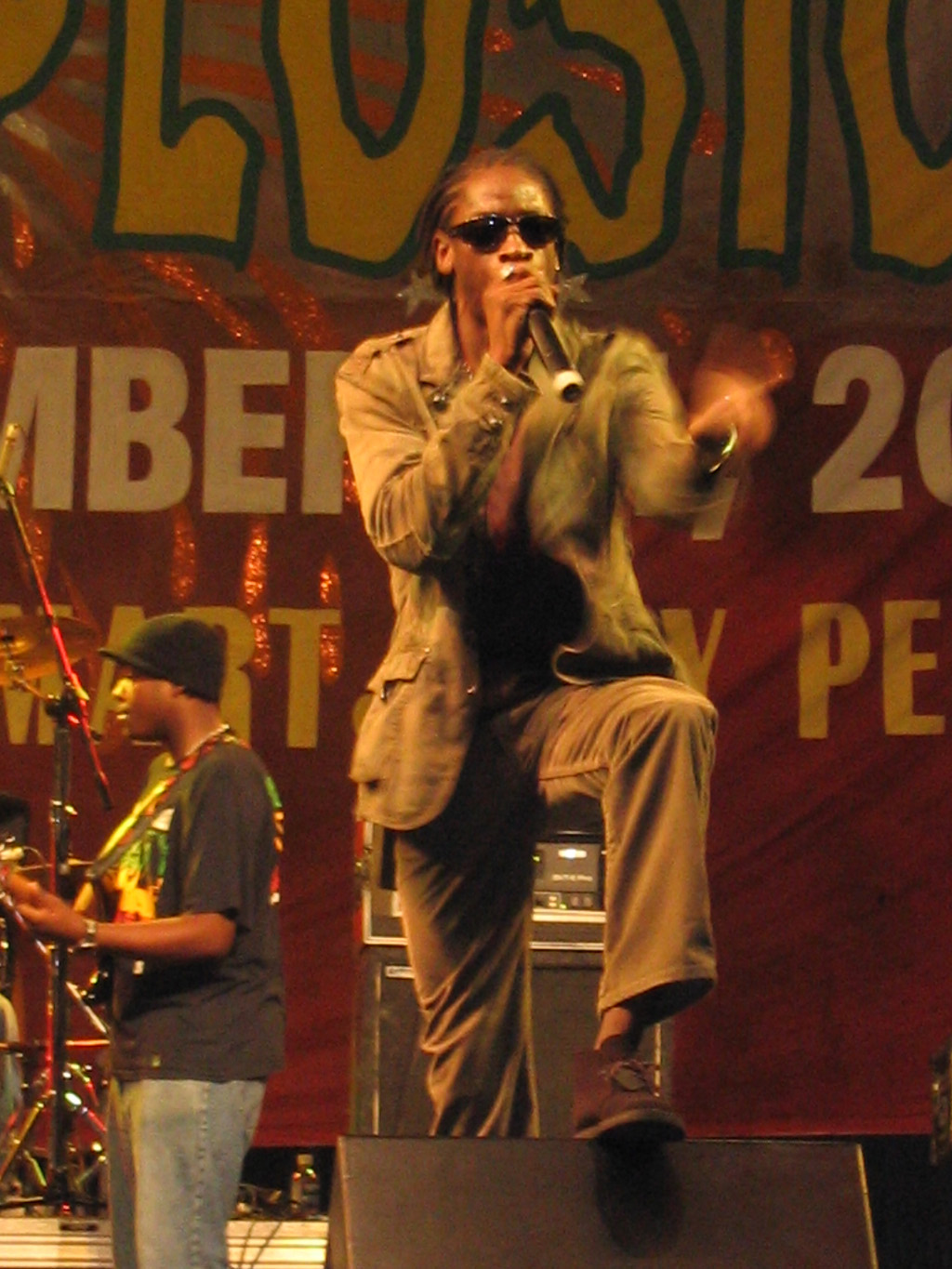
Mya collaborated with Bounty Killer (pictured) on "Whine."

Key
•	Denotes music videos directed or co-directed by Mya

Year	Title	Other performer(s)	Director(s)	Associated album	Notes	Ref.
2020	"The Truth"	—N/a	Josh Sikkema	Love Elevation Suite		
2020	"Simple Things" (In-Studio)"	—N/a	—N/a	T.K.O. (The Knock Out)		
2020	"Space and Time"	—N/a	Kirk Fraser; May 3rd Film	—N/a		
2021	"Worth It"	—N/a	Fadi Alkhouri	—N/a		
2023	"It's All About Me" (25th Anniversary Remix)	—N/a	Brian Friedman	Mýa	Released in celebration of "It's All About Me" 25th anniversary.	
2023	"Whine"	Bounty Killer	Josh Sikkema; Derek Brown	Whine (Dance Mix)		
2023	"Whine"	—N/a	Derek Brown	Whine (Dance Mix)	An alternative dance version music video.	
2024	"So Hype"	Junior Sanchez	Lauren Hashian; Spicy Rico	Songprints Vol. 1		
2025	"NVM"	Joyner Lucas	Joyner Lucas	—N/a		
2025	"Face to Face"	—N/a	BPace	Retrospect		
2025	"Give It To You"	—N/a	Derek Brown	Retrospect	Lyric video	
2026	"A.S.A.P."	—N/a	City James	Retrospect		
2026	"Just a Little Bit"	Too $hort	City James	Retrospect	Inspired by the lighting in Michael Jackson's "Rock With You."	
2026	"Give It To You"	D-Nice	Josh Sikkema	Retrospect	Inspired by Beat Street, Vanity 6, Mary Jane Girls, and Lisa Lisa and Cult Jam.	
2026	"Saturday Night"	—N/a	City James	Retrospect		

== Video albums ==
Title	Details	Ref.
Video Compilation	Released: 2003; Format: DVD; Label: A&M	

== See also ==
- Mya discography
- Mya filmography
- List of Mya live performances
- List of songs recorded by Mya
