= Mya discography =

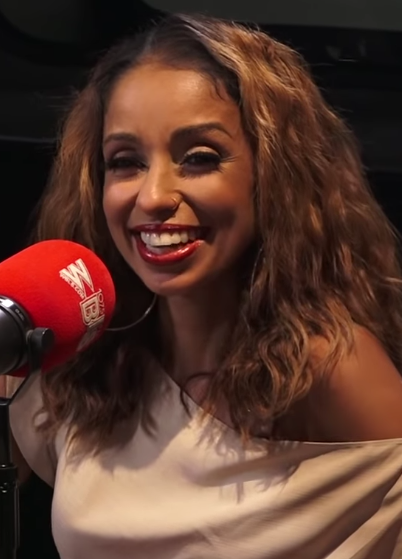
- Mýa in July 2018.
- Studio albums: 9
- Extended plays: 5
- Singles: 63
- Video albums: 1
- Mixtapes: 1
- Soundtrack appearances: 21

American singer Mya has released eight studio albums, one mixtape, five extended plays and sixty-three singles (including ten as a featured artists, seven promotional singles, and four charity singles). To date, Mya has sold over 20 million records worldwide. For the 2000s decade, Billboard listed her as one of their Hot 100 Artists of 2000s. According to Luminate, Mya has sold over 3.2 million albums in the United States. Additionally, she has sold seven million albums worldwide. As of 2023, the Recording Industry Association of America lists her total certified sales as a solo artists (including features) at five million in the United States.

In 1998, she released her certified platinum eponymous debut album. A commercial success, it produced her first US gold-certified top-ten single "It's All About Me" featuring Sisqó and two more top forty entries, "Movin' On" and "My First Night with You". Her collaborative efforts – "Ghetto Supastar (That Is What You Are)" and "Take Me There" continued her streak of hit singles, the former topping the song charts around the world. While the latter had a higher peak position in the US, it had a more modest global performance. Her second studio album, Fear of Flying (2000), a multi-platinum success, produced three charting singles – "The Best of Me", "Case of the Ex", and "Free". Her breakthrough single, "Case of the Ex" dominated the charts stateside and internationally. "Free", the album's third and final single, performed similarly. A collaboration with reggae artist Beenie Man followed. "Girls Dem Sugar" garnered minor chart success domestically, and became a fairly modest success worldwide. In 2001, she was featured on the Grammy Award-winning global number one single, "Lady Marmalade". The single earned Mya her first and to date only song to reach the United States summit, topping its Billboard Hot 100 chart for five consecutive weeks. By mid-2001, Harrison had amassed nine top 10 tracks and sold more than six million albums worldwide. Her next single, "Where the Dream Takes You", a pop ballad recorded for the soundtrack of the Disney's film Atlantis: The Lost Empire, garnered poor reception from critics and media.

In 2003, Mya returned with her third studio album, Moodring. The album was certified gold by the Recording Industry Association of America within two months. It was preceded by the album's first single, "My Love Is Like...Wo", which became a top-20 hit on the Billboard Hot 100. Its follow-up "Fallen" performed modestly. In the midst of promoting Moodring, video game developer Electronic Arts had approached and requested Mya to write, produce and record a theme song for their new James Bond video game, James Bond 007: Everything or Nothing. The result, "Everything or Nothing", a rave and techno-inspired song, was greeted with warm reception. Following a label change to Universal Motown, Harrison's often-delayed fourth studio album, Liberation (2007), – it would her last studio album under major label system – received a digital release in Japan only. It produced two singles – "Lock U Down" and "Ridin'". Both singles underperformed on the charts.

Since her departure from the major label system, she established her own record label Planet 9 and released eight projects – Sugar & Spice (2008), a Japan-exclusive album, Beauty & The Streets Vol.1 (2009), K.I.S.S. (Keep It Sexy & Simple) (2011), her most pop and club-oriented album, a trio of R&B–rooted EPs – With Love (2014), Sweet XVI (2014), Love Elevation Suite (2015), the critically acclaimed and Grammy-nominated Smoove Jones (2016) and T.K.O. (The Knock Out) (2018). In between, during, and after recording those projects, she released a slew of standalone singles – "Love Is the Answer", NOH8 theme song, "G.M.O. (Got My Own)", "I Deserve It", "I'ma Do It", "Just Call My Name", "Forever My Love", "True Love", "You Got Me, Part II", "Space and Time", "Handsfree", "Without You", "Worth It", and "Whine".

== Albums ==
=== Studio albums ===
List of studio albums, with selected chart positions, sales figures, and certifications
Title	Album details	Peak chart positions										Sales	Certifications
Title	Album details	US	US R&B	AUS	CAN	FRA	GER	JPN	NZ	SWI	UK	Sales	Certifications
Mya	Released: April 21, 1998; Label: Interscope; Formats: CD, cassette	29	13	—	—	—	—	—	—	—	—	US: 1,600,000	RIAA: Platinum
Fear of Flying	Released: April 25, 2000; Label: Interscope; Formats: CD, LP	15	7	28	39	102	52	—	39	33	81	US: 1,200,000	RIAA: Platinum; ARIA: Gold; MC: Gold
Moodring	Released: July 22, 2003; Label: A&M/Interscope; Formats: CD, LP	3	2	74	25	—	—	53	—	—	197	US: 589,000	RIAA: Gold
Liberation	Released: October 22, 2007; Label: Universal Motown; Formats: Digital download	—	—	—	—	—	—	—	—	—	—		
Sugar & Spice	Released: December 3, 2008; Label: Manhattan/Planet 9; Formats: CD, digital download	—	—	—	—	—	—	53	—	—	—		
K.I.S.S. (Keep It Sexy & Simple)	Released: April 20, 2011; Label: Manhattan/Planet 9; Formats: CD, digital download	—	74	—	—	—	—	72	—	—	—		
Smoove Jones	Released: February 14, 2016; Label: Planet 9; Formats: CD, digital download	— (Note: Smoove Jones did not enter the Billboard 200 album chart but peaked at number 17 on the Independent Albums chart.)	30	—	—	—	—	—	—	—	—		
T.K.O. (The Knock Out)	Released: April 20, 2018; Label: Planet 9/The Orchard; Formats: CD, digital download	— (Note: T.K.O. (The Knock Out) did not enter the Billboard 200 album chart but peaked at number 41 on the Independent Albums chart.)	—	—	—	—	—	—	—	—	—		
Retrospect	Released: May 15, 2026; Label: Planet 9/Virgin Music Group; Formats: CD, digital download	—	—	—	—	—	—	—	—	—	—		
"—" denotes a recording that did not chart or was not released in that territory.

=== Mixtapes ===
List of mixtapes with selected chart positions
Title	Details	Peak chart positions
Title	Details	US R&B
Beauty & the Streets Vol. 1	Released: September 29, 2009; Label: Planet 9/Young Empire/Fontana; Formats: CD, digital download	55

== EPs ==
List of extended plays with selected details
Title	Details
With Love	Released: February 14, 2014; Label: Planet 9; Format: Digital download
Sweet XVI	Released: April 21, 2014; Label: Planet 9; Format: Digital download
Love Elevation Suite	Released: February 14, 2015; Label: Planet 9; Format: Digital download

== Singles ==
=== As lead artist ===
List of lead artist singles
Title	Year	Peak chart positions										Certifications	Album
Title	Year	US	US R&B	AUS	CAN	GER	IRE	NL	NZ	SWI	UK	Certifications	Album
"It's All About Me" (featuring Sisqó) (Note: "It's All About Me" did not enter any Billboard Japan or Oricon singles chart but peaked at number 91 on J-Wave's Tokio Hot 100 chart.)	1998	6	2	—	—	—	—	76	13	—	—	RIAA: Gold	Mya
"Movin' On" (featuring Silkk the Shocker)	1998	34	4	—	—	—	—	—	11	—	—		Mya
"My First Night with You"	1999	28	28	—	—	—	—	—	—	—	—		Mya
"Take Me There" (with Blackstreet featuring Mase and Blinky Blink) (Note: "Take Me There" did not enter any Billboard Japan or Oricon singles chart but peaked at number 15 on J-Wave's Tokio Hot 100 chart.)	1999	14	10	—	21	58	9	22	1	—	7	RMNZ: Platinum	The Rugrats Movie
"The Best of Me" (featuring Jadakiss)	2000	50	14	—	—	26	—	75	—	64	—		Fear of Flying
"Best of Me, Part 2" (featuring Jay-Z)	2000	—	55	—	—	—	—	—	—	—	—		Backstage: A Hard Knock Life
"Case of the Ex"	2000	2	10	1	14 (Note: "Case of the Ex" reached number 14 when RPM ceased publication in November 2000.)	39	12	8	17	72	3	ARIA: Platinum; BPI: Silver; RMNZ: Gold	Fear of Flying
"Free" (Note: "Free" did not enter any Billboard Japan or Oricon singles chart but peaked at number 76 on J-Wave's Tokio Hot 100 chart.)	2000	42	52	4	— (Note: "Free" did not enter the Canadian Singles Chart but peaked at number 25 on the Canada Airplay chart.)	66	35	41	—	76	11	ARIA: Platinum	Fear of Flying
"Lady Marmalade" (with Christina Aguilera, Lil' Kim and Pink) (Note: "Lady Marmalade" did not enter any Billboard Japan or Oricon singles chart but peaked at number 18 on J-Wave's Tokio Hot 100 chart.)	2001	1	43	1	17	1	1	2	1	1	1	RIAA: Platinum; ARIA: 2× Platinum; BPI: 2× Platinum; BVMI: Platinum; IFPI SWI: Gold; NVPI: Platinum; RMNZ: 2× Platinum	Moulin Rouge!
"My Love Is Like...Wo"	2003	13	17	25	—	73	36	—	33	—	33		Moodring
"Fallen" (Note: "Fallen" did not enter any Billboard Japan or Oricon singles chart but peaked at number 22 on J-Wave's Tokio Hot 100 chart.)	2003	51	35	—	—	—	—	—	—	—	—		Moodring
"Lock U Down" (featuring Lil' Wayne)	2007	—	— (Note: "Lock U Down" did not enter the Hot R&B/Hip-Hop Songs chart but peaked at number 1 on the Bubbling Under R&B/Hip-Hop Singles chart.)	—	—	— (Note: "Lock U Down" did not enter the German Singles Chart but peaked at number 9 on Germany's Deutsche Urban Charts.)	—	—	—	—	—		Liberation
"Ridin'"	2007	—	58	—	—	—	—	—	—	—	—		Liberation
"Paradise" (Note: "Paradise" did not enter any Billboard Japan or Oricon singles chart but peaked at number 35 on J-Wave's Tokio Hot 100 chart.)	2008	—	—	—	—	—	—	—	—	—	—		Sugar & Spice
"Fabulous Life"	2011	—	—	—	—	—	—	—	—	—	—		K.I.S.S. (Keep It Sexy & Simple)
"Runnin' Back" featuring Iyaz	2011	—	—	—	—	—	—	—	—	—	—		K.I.S.S. (Keep It Sexy & Simple)
"Earthquake" featuring Trina	2011	—	—	—	—	—	—	—	—	—	—		K.I.S.S. (Keep It Sexy & Simple)
"Somebody Come Get This Bitch" (featuring Stacie & Lacie)	2011	—	—	—	—	—	—	—	—	—	—		K.I.S.S. (Keep It Sexy & Simple)
"Mr. Incredible"	2011	—	—	—	—	—	—	—	—	—	—		K.I.S.S. (Keep It Sexy & Simple)
"Mess Up My Hair" (featuring Beenie Man)	2012	—	—	—	—	—	—	—	—	—	—		K.I.S.S. (Keep It Sexy & Simple)
"Evolve"	2012	—	—	—	—	—	—	—	—	—	—		K.I.S.S. (Keep It Sexy & Simple)
"Space"	2014	—	—	—	—	—	—	—	—	—	—		Love Elevation Suite and With Love
"Do It"	2015	—	—	—	—	—	—	—	—	—	—		With Love
"Welcome to My World"	2015	—	—	—	—	—	—	—	—	—	—		Smoove Jones
"Team You"	2015	—	—	—	—	—	—	—	—	—	—		Smoove Jones
"Coolin'"	2017	—	—	—	—	—	—	—	—	—	—		Smoove Jones
"Ready for Whatever"	2017	—	—	—	—	—	—	—	—	—	—		T.K.O. (The Knock Out)
"You Got Me"	2018	—	—	—	—	—	—	—	—	—	—		T.K.O. (The Knock Out)
"Damage"	2018	—	—	—	—	—	—	—	—	—	—		T.K.O. (The Knock Out)
"Knock You Out"	2018	—	—	—	—	—	—	—	—	—	—		T.K.O. (The Knock Out)
"G.M.O. (Got My Own)" (featuring Tink)	2018	—	—	—	—	—	—	—	—	—	—		Non-album single
"Open"	2019	—	—	—	—	—	—	—	—	—	—		T.K.O. (The Knock Out)
"Handsfree" (with Ding Dong)	2019	—	—	—	—	—	—	—	—	—	—		Non-album singles
"You Got Me, Part II"	2020	—	—	—	—	—	—	—	—	—	—		Non-album singles
"Space and Time"	2020	—	—	—	—	—	—	—	—	—	—		Non-album singles
"Without You" (with Alyx Ander)	2020	—	—	—	—	—	—	—	—	—	—		Non-album singles
"I Deserve It"	2020	—	—	—	—	—	—	—	—	—	—		Non-album singles
"I'ma Do It"	2020	—	—	—	—	—	—	—	—	—	—		Non-album singles
"Just Call My Name"	2020	—	—	—	—	—	—	—	—	—	—		Retrospect
"Forever My Love"	2021	—	—	—	—	—	—	—	—	—	—		Non-album singles
"True Love"	2021	—	—	—	—	—	—	—	—	—	—		Non-album singles
"Worth It"	2021	—	—	—	—	—	—	—	—	—	—		Non-album singles
"Whine" (featuring Bounty Killer)	2023	—	—	—	—	—	—	—	—	—	—		Non-album singles
"Anytime"	2024	—	—	—	—	—	—	—	—	—	—		Retrospect
"Face to Face"	2025	—	—	—	—	—	—	—	—	—	—		Retrospect
"Give It to You"	2025	—	—	—	—	—	—	—	—	—	—		Retrospect
"A.S.A.P."	2026	—	— (Note: "A.S.A.P" did not enter the Billboard Hot R&B/Hip-Hop Songs Chart, but peaked at number 16 on the Adult R&B Airplay Songs Chart.)	—	—	—	—	—	—	—	—		Retrospect
"Just a Little Bit" (featuring Too Short)	2026	—	—	—	—	—	—	—	—	—	—		Retrospect
"—" denotes a single that did not chart.

=== As featured artist ===
List of singles as featured artist
Title	Year	Peak chart positions										Certifications	Album
Title	Year	US	US R&B	AUS	CAN	GER	IRE	NL	NZ	SWI	UK	Certifications	Album
"Ghetto Supastar" (Pras featuring Ol' Dirty Bastard and Mya) (Note: "Ghetto Supastar (That Is What You Are)" did not enter any Billboard Japan or Oricon singles chart but peaked at number 24 on J-Wave's Tokio Hot 100 chart.)	1998	15	8	2	9	1	1	1	1	1	2	ARIA: Platinum; BPI: 2× Platinum; BVMI: Platinum; NVPI: Gold; RMNZ: 2× Platinum	Bulworth
"Somebody Like Me" (Silkk the Shocker featuring Mya)	1999	— (Note: "Somebody Like You" did not enter the Billboard Hot 100 chart but peaked at number 12 on the Bubbling Under Hot 100 Singles chart.)	43	—	—	—	—	—	—	—	—		Made Man
"J.O.B" (Foxy Brown featuring Mya)	1999	—	— (Note: "J.O.B" did not enter the Hot R&B/Hip-Hop Songs chart but peaked at number 16 on the Bubbling Under R&B/Hip-Hop Singles chart.)	—	—	—	—	—	—	—	—		Chyna Doll
"Girls Dem Sugar" (Beenie Man featuring Mya)	2000	54	16	—	—	—	—	—	—	—	13		Art and Life
"What More Can I Give" (with Michael Jackson and All Stars)	2003	—	—	—	—	—	—	—	—	—	—		Non-album single
"Thin Line" (Jurassic 5 featuring Mya)	2003	—	—	—	—	— (Note: "Thin Line" did enter the German Singles Chart but peaked at number 10 on Germany's Deutsche Urban Charts.)	—	—	—	—	—		Power in Numbers
"Sugar Daddy" (Cuban Link featuring Mya) (Note: "Sugar Daddy" did not enter any Billboard Japan or Oricon singles chart but peaked at number 80 on J-Wave's Tokio Hot 100 chart.)	2005	—	—	—	—	—	—	—	—	—	—		Chain Reaction
"Forever in Our Hearts" (with Music for Relief)	2005	—	—	—	—	—	—	—	—	—	—		Non-album single
"No Matter What They Say" (Penelope Jones featuring Mya)	2006	—	—	—	—	—	—	—	—	—	—		Non-album single
"I Will Give It All to You" (Vlad Topalov featuring Mya)	2007	—	—	—	—	—	—	—	—	—	—		Odinokaya Zvezda
"We Are the World 25 for Haiti" (with Artists for Haiti)	2010	2	—	18	7	—	9	—	8	—	50		Non-album single
"Love Is the Answer" (Cedric Gervais starring Mya)	2011	—	—	—	—	—	—	—	—	—	—		Miamication
"Bum Bum" (Kevin Lyttle featuring Mya)	2015	—	—	—	—	—	—	—	—	—	—		Non-album single
"So Hype" (Junior Sanchez featuring Mya)	2024	—	—	—	—	—	—	—	—	—	—		Songprints Vol.1
"—" denotes a song that did not chart or was not released in that territory.

=== Promotional singles ===
List of promotional singles
Title	Year	Peak chart positions	Album
Title	Year	US R&B	Album
"Where the Dream Takes You"	2001	— (Note: "Where the Dream Takes You" did not enter the Billboard Hot 100 but peaked at number 38 on the Gavin Report's Adult Contemporary chart.)	Atlantis: The Lost Empire
"Ayo!" (featuring DJ Kool) (Note: "Ayo!" did not enter the German Singles Chart but peaked at number 17 on Germany's Deutsche Urban Charts.)	2006	70	non-album release
"My Bra"	2007	—	The Matters of Life & Dating
"Wish You Were Here" (featuring Che'Nelle)	2009	—	Sugar & Spice
"Show Me Somethin'" (featuring Bun B)	2009	—	Beauty & the Streets Vol. 1
"Black Out"	2009	—	Beauty & the Streets Vol. 1
"Alive"	2010	—	Exclusive 2000–2010: Decade Best
"With You" (featuring MyGuyMars)	2019	—	T.K.O. (The Knock Out)
"—" denotes did not chart, or was not released.

== Album appearances ==
List of songs with performers
Year	Song	Other performer(s)	Album
1998	"Ghetto Supastar (That Is What You Are)"	Pras, Ol' Dirty Bastard	Ghetto Supastar
1999	"Take Me There"	BLACKstreet, Ma$e, Blinky Blink	Finally
1999	"Somebody Like Me"	Silkk the Shocker	Made Man
1999	"J.O.B"	Foxy Brown, Joe Beast	Chyna Doll
2000	"Best of Me, Part 2"	Jay-Z	Backstage: A Hard Knock Life
2000	"Girls Dem Sugar"	Beenie Man	Art and Life
2001	"4 Shure" [Remix]	Groove Theory, Jagged Edge	The Answer
2001	"What More Can I Give"	Michael Jackson and All Stars	—N/a
2002	"Fair Xchange" [Remix]	2Pac	Better Dayz
2002	"Thin Line" [Remix]	Jurassic 5	Power in Numbers
2003	"Love Somebody (Cinema Version II)"	Yūji Oda	11 Colors
2004	"Forever with You"	Guy Sebastian	Beautiful Life
2005	"Leave That Boy Alone"	Shortee Redd	From da Block Up
2005	"We Won't Stop"	Shortee Redd	From da Block Up
2005	"Sugar Daddy"	Cuban Link	Chain Reaction
2005	"Sexy"	Ray J	Raydiation
2006	"Matter of Time"	Trae	Restless
2006	"No Matter What They Say"	Penelope Jones	—N/a
2006	"Close to You"	Dionne Warwick	My Friends & Me
2007	"Hold N' Back"	Marques Houston	Veteran
2007	"I Will Give It All to You"	Vlad Topalov	Odinokaya Zvezda
2007	"Flippin'"	Lil' Flip	I Need Mine
2007	"I Got You"	Ky-Mani Marley	Radio
2008	"Good II Me"	Bun B	II Trill
2008	"That La La"	Elephant Man	Let's Get Physical
2008	"Usually"	Trillville, Attitude, T. Waters	—N/a
2008	"Tired"	Z-Ro	Crack
2009	"Searchin' for Love"	Lil' Eddie	City of My Heart
2009	"About My Bi"	Shawty Lo	Carlos
2009	"Love Letters"	Shyheim	Disrespectfully Speaking
2010	"Girl Like Her"	Cassidy	C.A.S.H. (Cass Always Stays Hard)
2011	"Can I"	Trina	Diamonds Are Forever
2011	"If I Ever" [Remix]	Wayne Wonder	—N/a
2011	"Convertible"	Amanda Lepore	I...Amanda Lepore
2011	"Hold On"	Maino	—N/a
2011	"Love Is the Answer"	Cedric Gervais	Miamication
2012	"Waiting for You"	Ron Browz	Fly Away
2015	"Focused On You"	Eric Bellinger, 2 Chainz	Cuffing Season
2017	"Roll Call"	GoldLink	At What Cost
2019	"X-Rated"	Beenie Man, Sekon Sta	Yard Jam Riddim
2019	"Handsfree"	Ding Dong	Sexting Riddim
2019	"Best of You"	Tory Lanez	Chixtape 5
2021	"Jiggy Mami"	Nitty Scott	Jiggy Mami
2023	"Docta'"	Beenie Man	Simma
2024	"Organic Vibes"	Dizzy Wright	Harsh Reality
2024	"So Hype"	Junior Sanchez	Songprints Vol. 1
2024	"Clearer"	Z-Ro	The Ghetto Gospel

== Soundtrack appearances ==
List of songs with performers
Year	Song	Other performer(s)	Album
1998	"Ghetto Supastar (That Is What You Are)"	Pras, Ol' Dirty Bastard	Bulworth
1998	"Movin' Out"	Noreaga, Raekwon	Belly
1999	"Take Me There"	BLACKstreet, Ma$e, Blinky Blink	The Rugrats Movie
1999	"Why Should I Believe You"	—N/a	Life
2000	"Free"	—N/a	Bait
2001	"Where the Dream Takes You"	—N/a	Atlantis: The Lost Empire
2001	"Lady Marmalade"	Christina Aguilera, Lil' Kim, P!nk	Moulin Rouge!
2001	"Sex Machine"	—N/a	Legally Blonde
2002	"Cream Cheese"	—N/a	All About the Benjamins
2003	"Everything or Nothing"	—N/a	James Bond 007: Everything or Nothing
2003	"Cell Block Tango"	—N/a	Chicago
2004	"Fallen"	Chingy	Barbershop 2: Back in Business
2004	"Things Come & Go"	Sean Paul	Barbershop 2: Back in Business
2004	"Do You Only Wanna Dance"	—N/a	Dirty Dancing: Havana Nights
2004	"Let's Dance"	—N/a	Shall We Dance?
2004	"Fallen"	—N/a	A Cinderella Story
2005	"Not Gonna Drop"	—N/a	Fat Albert
2007	"My Bra"	—N/a	Matters of Life and Dating
2018	"Daddy"	—N/a	5th Ward The Series Vol.1
2018	"His Eye Is on the Sparrow"	—N/a	5th Ward The Series Vol.1
2020	"Make Me Proud"	—N/a	5th Ward The Series Vol.2
2021	"Lazarus"	Ron Killings	Lazarus

== See also ==
- Mya videography
- Mya filmography
- List of Mya live performances
- List of songs recorded by Mya
