= Movin' On (Mya song) =

Single by Mya featuring Silkk the Shocker

from the album Mya
- Released: July 28, 1998
- Recorded: 1997; Silent Sounds Studios (Atlanta, Georgia); The Record Plant (Los Angeles, California)
- Genre: Funk; pop; hip hop ("Movin' On" with rap)
- Length: 4:30
- Label: Interscope
- Songwriters: Mya Harrison; Vyshonne Miller; Mark Andrews; Darryl Pearson
- Producer: Darryl "Day" Pearson

Mya featuring Silkk the Shocker singles chronology
"Ghetto Supastar (That Is What You Are)" (1998)	"Movin' On" (1998)	"Take Me There" (1998)

Silkk the Shocker singles chronology
"It Ain't My Fault" (1998)	"Movin' On" (1998)	"Somebody Like Me" (1999)

Music video
- "Movin' On" on YouTube

"Movin' On" is a song by American singer Mya, released in July 1998 as the second single from her self-titled debut studio album. It was written and composed by Harrison, Mark Andrews and Darryl Pearson. Musically, the album version is a funk and pop song, while the single remix version is a hip hop song. Lyrically, the record speaks of a woman leaving her cheating ex-boyfriend.

Upon its release, the song received generally positive reviews from contemporary music critics, who praised the singles' remix stellar production and Silkk's rap cameo. "Movin' On" became a top 40 hit on Billboard's Hot 100; peaking and spending three non-consecutive weeks at number thirty-four. It fared better on the US Hot R&B Singles chart, peaking at number four. Internationally, the single reached the Top 20 in New Zealand.

Its accompanying music video was filmed by director G. Thomas Ferguson and University Music CEO Haqq Islam. The video was shot in the non-fictional high school University High. In the video, Harrison displays her cheerleading skills and towards the end of the video leaves her cheating ex-boyfriend.

== Critical reception ==
Billboard magazine gave the song a positive review, writing, "This is no one-hit wonder. The ingenue who recently scored a pop smash with It's All About Me hits even harder with this wildly contagious, funk-fortified jeep jam. For such a young woman (she's a mere 18), she oozes with the confidence and stylistic flair of an artist twice her age. In an effort to attract the widest range of format support, the label has assembled a stellar remix package that includes Ralphi Rosario's swirling, pop-ready disco-house revision, as well as A. Hagg Islam's raw hip-hop version, which features an impressive rap cameo by Silkk The Shocker."

== Accolades ==
Year	Ceremony	Award	Result	Ref.
1999	Lady of Soul	Best R&B/Soul Song of the Year	Nominated	

Rankings for "Movin' On"
Year	Publication	Accolade	Rank	Ref.
1998	MTV	Top 96 of 1998	46	
2013	AllMusic	R&B 40: 1998	33	
2014	Complex	The 50 Best R&B Songs With Rap Features	48	

== Chart performance ==
In the United States, "Movin' On" debuted at number 75 on Billboard Hot 100 chart for the issue dated week of August 8, 1998. It ascended from 63-49 in its fourth week for the issue dated week of August 29, 1998. It continued to climb the Hot 100, ascending from 49 to 42 in its fifth week for the issue dated week of September 5, 1998. The song reached its peak at number 34, issue dated week of September 12, 1998. It spent 20 consecutive weeks on the chart. "Movin' On" became Harrison's second consecutive Top 40 (solo) on that chart. It performed better on the Hot R&B Singles chart. It made its debut at number 20, issue dated week of August 1, 1998. It entered the Top Ten issue dated week of August 29, 1998 ascending from 13-7. Due to the strength of the song, if Interscope had released "Movin' On" on cassette and CD configurations; the song could've been a strong contender for number one position. However, despite being available on 12' inch only, the song still managed to rise from 7 to 5 on the Hot R&B Singles chart. The song's move resulted in the chart's highest-ranking 12'-inch only single since MC Hammer's "U Can't Touch This" hit number one on vinyl in 1990. Nevertheless, "Movin' On" reached its peak at number four, issue dated week of September 12, 1998. In total, the song spent 22 consecutive weeks on the chart. It became Harrison's second consecutive Top Ten (solo), and third overall on that chart.

In New Zealand, "Movin' On" debuted at number 32 during the week of March 3, 1999. It reached its peak at number eleven during the week of April 11, 1999. It spent a total of eight non-consecutive weeks on the chart. Harrison earned her third consecutive Top 20 hit in New Zealand.

== Legacy ==
Complex recognized "Movin' On" as one of the Best R&B Videos of the 90's. The song ranked tenth on Billboard's list of 20 Best High School Music Videos of All Time. Power star and recording artist Rotimi sampled "Movin' On" for his five-track Summer Bangerz EP (2016).

== Remix ==
A remixed version of "Movin' On" was produced in the process, aptly titled "Movin' Out". It was released as the lead single from the motion picture film Belly (1998) and featured East coast rappers Noreaga and Raekwon. Interscope commissioned a music video which was directed by music director Hype Williams.

== Formats and track listings ==
US 12" single and vinyl single

A1 "Movin' On" (With Rap) Featuring Silkk the Shocker – 4:30
A2 "Movin' On" (Acapella With Rap) Featuring Silkk the Shocker – 3:58
B1 "Movin' On" (No Rap) – 4:29
B2 "Movin' On" (Instrumental Version) – 4:29

US 12" single and vinyl single

A1 "Movin' On" (Ralphi's Vox Club) – 7:29
A2 "Movin' On" (Ralphi's Dub) – 7:00
B1 "Movin' On" (Fernando's Club Mix) – 4:56
B2 "Movin' On" (Fernando's Radio Edit) – 3:53
B3 "Movin' On" (Ralphi's Dub Beats)

US CD single

1. "Movin' On" (Ralphi's Club Edit) – 3:25
2. "Movin' On" (Fernando's Radio Edit) – 3:52
3. "Movin' On" (Featuring Silkk The Shocker) (Clean) – 4:30
4. "Movin' On" (Album Version) – 4:29

Italy 12" single

A1 "Movin' On" (Ralphi's Vox Club) – 7:29
A2 "Movin' On" (Ralphi's Dub) – 7:00
B1 "Movin' On" (University Mix Dirty Version) – 5:09
B2 "Movin' On" (Featuring Silkk The Shocker Clean) – 4:30
B3 "Movin' On" (Fernando's Club Mix)

UK 12" single

A1 "Movin' On" (Ralphi's Vox Club) – 7:29
A2 "Movin' On" (Ralphi's Dub) – 7:00
B1 "Movin' On" (Fernando's Club Mix) – 4:56
B2 "Movin' On" (Fernando's Radio Edit) – 3:53

European CD single

1. "Movin' On" (Radio Edit) Featuring Silkk The Shocker – 3:58
2. "Movin' On" (Fernando's Radio Edit) – 3:52
3. "Movin' On" (Album Version) – 4:30
4. University Mix Featuring Noreaga, Raekwon – 4:30

== Credits and personnel ==
Credits adapted from the liner notes of Mya.

=== Recording ===
- Recorded at Silent Sound Studios (Atlanta, Georgia) and The Record Plant (Hollywood, California)
- Mixed at The Record Plant (Hollywood, California)

=== Personnel ===
- Darryl "DAY" Pearson – production
- A. Haqq Islam – remix, additional production
- Sisqo – vocal arrangements
- Thom "TK" Kidd – recording engineer
- Mike Alvord – recording engineer
- Jason Webb – recording engineer assistance
- Kevin Lively – recording engineer assistance

== Charts ==
=== Weekly charts ===
Weekly chart performance for "Movin' On"
Chart (1998–1999)	Peak position
New Zealand (Recorded Music NZ)	11
US Billboard Hot 100	34
US Dance Club Songs (Billboard)	11
US Hot R&B/Hip-Hop Songs (Billboard)	4
US Rhythmic Airplay (Billboard)	3

=== Year-end charts ===
Year-end chart performance for "Movin' On"
Chart (1998)	Position
US Hot R&B Songs (Billboard)	36

== Release history ==
Release history and formats for "Movin' On"
Country	Release date	Format(s)	Label	Ref.
United States	July 28, 1998	CHR/Rhythmic	Interscope	
United States	July 28, 1998	Urban	Interscope	
United States	October 20, 1998	CHR/Pop	Interscope	
Germany	September 7, 1998	CD single	Interscope	
