= Melky Sedeck =

American hip hop group

Melky Sedeck is a Haitian-American R&B hip hop sibling duo. The name of the group is drawn from the names of singer Blandinna Melky Jean and her multi-instrumentalist brother Farel Sedeck Guerschom Jean. The name of the group (and of the siblings) is an allusion to Melchizedek, a figure from Christian and Jewish tradition. Both artists are younger siblings of Wyclef Jean.

In 1995, Melky and Sedeck Jean collaborated with Darryl "Day" Pearson on "I've Got a Love Jones for You", a single used upon the soundtrack of the feature film Love Jones. The track was Melky and Sedeck's first official recording as part of the Refugee Camp and their debut single; they also performed on the 'Love Jones' package tour. The duo later signed with MCA Records. In 1999, they released their debut album, Sister & Brother. It featured tracks that involved collaborations with Pearson and Supreme C. In March that year the band performed in Toronto with The Roots.

At 1999's Lilith Fair, they performed alongside artists including Aimee Mann, The Innocence Mission, Beth Orton, Bijou Phillips, Sixpence None the Richer, Liz Phair, Cibo Matto, and Bif Naked. The founder of the event, Sarah McLachlan, also performed with Melky at the fair's finale.

The soundtrack to the 2000s feature film Love & Basketball featured "Morning Star", a song which Melky Sedeck produced and performed.
