= Sister & Brother =

Studio album by Melky Sedeck
- Released: June 15, 1999
- Genre: Hip hop; R&B
- Length: 48:38
- Label: MCA
- Producer: Sedeck Jean

Professional ratings
Review scores
Source	Rating
AllMusic	4/5 stars
Robert Christgau	(1-star Honorable Mention)
Los Angeles Times	4/4 stars
Rolling Stone	3.5/5 stars

Sister & Brother is the full-length debut by Melky Sedeck, released in 1999. It mixes a variety of genres, including hip-hop, reggae, soul, and gospel.

The album was initially titled Da Joint.

== Critical reception ==
The Los Angeles Times wrote that "Melky’s plush, earthy voice simultaneously conveys attitude, passion and coolness, getting to your heart through deep emotion, not high drama." Robert Christgau wrote that "conscious siblings though they may be, they do sex best," and praised "Shake It" and "Attraction". The New Yorker listed the album as one of 1999's twelve best, calling it "a bright, celestial soundscape." The New York Times wrote that "this fine set of grooves deserves attention, most of all for Ms. [Melky] Jean's vociferous talent.

== Track listing ==
1. "Shake It" (featuring Supreme C) – 4:18
2. "Foolish Heart" – 4:14
3. "To Sir With Love" – 3:40
4. "Lady" (featuring Darryl Pearson) – 4:18
5. "Mi Amor" – 3:37
6. "Raw" – 5:51
7. "In Time" – 4:01
8. "#1 Guy" – 4:07
9. "Attraction" – 4:00
10. "High Heel Shoes" – 2:45
11. "Diva" – 3:16
12. "Paradise" – 4:31
