= You Got Me, Part II =

Single by Mýa
- Released: April 20, 2020
- Genre: R&B
- Length: 4:28
- Label: Planet 9; The Orchard
- Songwriter: Mýa
- Producer: Bink!

Mýa singles chronology
| "Handsfree" (2019) | "You Got Me, Part II" (2020) | "Space & Time" (2020) |

"You Got Me, Part II" is a song recorded by American singer Mýa. Recorded in January 2020, it was written by Mýa with production by hip-hop producer Bink!. A sequel song, "You Got Me, Part II" serves as a conceptual continuation to its original version. Significantly different from the original version – both musically and lyrically, "You Got Me, Part II" is a sensual, hypnotic ode to throwback 90's R&B, while lyrically it addresses the protagonist's unexpected feelings for someone she had no intentions of falling for. As tradition and a standalone single, "You Got Me, Part II" was released on April 20, 2020 in celebration of her debut album Mýa (1998).

== Background and release ==
"You Got Me, Part II" was first announced as a single during a brief interview with Fox 5 Washington D.C.'s anchorman Wisdom Martin. Beginning on April 13, 2020, "You Got Me, Part II" was made available for pre-order. A week later, "You Got Me, Part II" was officially released April 20, 2020 on all digital platforms.

== Artwork ==
Taking to Instagram, Mýa uploaded the single's official artwork. Mýa is seen wearing a buttoned-up black blazer, opting to go shirtless underneath the garment. On display is her decolletage area, which is accessorized with a thick necklace. The ensemble is paired with high-waisted skintight pants with a white strip going down to the side and black heels with white spots all over. To complete the look, Mýa wore a red hat with her hair sported in a bun while black lipstick and nail polish was applied.

== Composition ==
Constructed around throwback 90's R&B, "You Got Me, Part II" is a sensual, hypnotic midtempo production with a runtime of four minutes and twenty-eight seconds. Written by Mýa with production courtesy of Bink! and additional live instrumentation provided by producer Chucky Thompson, "You Got Me, Part II" is a conceptual continuation of its original version performed in the key of B major with a common time of 127 beats per minute.

Lyrically, the song chronicles the protagonist's realization that she has unexpected feelings for someone she had no intention of falling for. "You got me boy/Yeah you got me/I thought I was stronger than this/ You had at me hello/ I ain't use to this" Mýa sings with conviction on the song's chorus. Vocally, in the verses, Mýa's voice is rich and robust which serves as contrast to her light, brighter tone in the song's multi-layered chorus.

== Music video ==
Following the song's release, a lyric video was released shortly after.

== Credits and personnel ==
Credits adapted from Tidal.

- Mýa – vocals, songwriting, vocal production
- Bink! – record production
- Chucky Thompson – live instrumentation

== Release history ==
| Region | Date | Format | Label | Ref. |
|---|---|---|---|---|
| Various | April 20, 2020 | Digital download; streaming | Planet 9; The Orchard | |
