= Darryl Pearson =

American songwriter, producer, multi-instrumentalist, singer, music executive

- Also known as: DX, DAY, DP SOUNDZ
- Born: Baltimore, Maryland, United States
- Genres: R&B; soul; hip-hop
- Occupations: Songwriter; producer; multi-instrumentalist; singer; music executive
- Labels: Da Bassment Cru; MCA Records

Darryl "Day" Pearson is an American record producer, songwriter, singer, and multi-instrumentalist, best known for writing and producing "It's All About Me", a Mya/Sisqó single that peaked at #6 on the Billboard Hot 100 chart, "Part Time Lover" (a Top 10 R&B Hit for group H-Town from the 1994 Above the Rim soundtrack), as well as "Trippin' ", a collaboration between Total and Missy Elliott that climbed to #7 on the Hot 100 in 1998. His 1998 contributions to albums from Total, Mya, and others resulted in a top 10 placement on Billboard's "Hot R&B Producers" 1998 Year-End Chart. Pearson has also produced or written songs for Usher, Beyoncé, and Sam Smith, among others.

== Career ==
=== Music beginnings and Swing Mob ===
Motivated to enter the music industry in the early 1990s, Pearson began producing demos for friends sending music to record labels in hopes of securing deals. This practice developed into a writing and production partnership with R&B group Jodeci. He relocated to both Teaneck, New Jersey and Rochester, New York to work with DeVante Swing's Swing Mob collective, which evolved into R&B/Hip-hop production team and Elektra Records label imprint Da Bassment Cru with the addition of producer Timothy "Timbaland" Mosley. Over the next five years, Pearson would be credited with creating music for various affiliated artists including Missy Elliott (as well as her group Sista), Mary J. Blige, K-Ci & JoJo, Dru Hill, Ginuwine (via an unreleased 1995 debut album for Da Bassment/Elektra), Timbaland & Magoo, and the eponymous debut album of LaFace/Arista Records artist Usher, among others.

=== Melky & Day, Mya and MCA solo record deal ===
In 1996, Pearson began working closely with ByStorm Entertainment CEO Mark Pitts on the creation and sound formulation of R&B Band Born In August, discussed in-depth in a July 1996 Billboard article. Pearson would produce, arrange vocals, and play all instruments on their debut single "April" released in August 1996, lauded in a Billboard review for his ability to "pair the perfect track to the group's melodic vocal inflections... result[ing in] a light, airy, and exciting track worthy of a hot summer release." Their completed, 15-track debut album Timeless Journey was later shelved indefinitely by parent label Universal Records.

In 1997, Pearson joined forces with singer and songwriter Blandinna Melky Jean from group Melky Sedeck to create R&B duo Melky & Day, and released single "I Got A Love Jones For You" for Columbia Records/Sony on the 1997 Love Jones soundtrack alongside duo Refugee Camp All-Stars. The single was a remake of the hit Brighter Side of Darkness single "Love Jones".

In 1998, Pearson co-wrote and produced hit single "Trippin'" from Total album Kima, Keisha, and Pam, and was also a major contributor to Mya's eponymous 1998 debut album for University/Interscope Records, producing and/or writing 7 of the 13 tracks that appeared. These included Top 40 single "Movin On" and Top 10 single "It's All About Me". Also in 1998, Pearson contributed to Mosley's debut single as an artist, "Here We Come" alongside Elliott, Playa, and Magoo for his solo debut album Tim's Bio: Life from da Bassment, which charted on the Billboard Hot 100, as well as the UK and Dutch charts. As discussed in a 1998 Timbaland interview for MTV, "Darryl [and I] were messing around in the studio and he was humming the Spider-Man tune, 'Doomp do doomp, doomp do doomp,' so he was doing that, and I was like, 'Do that again,'... [h]e did it, and I sampled his vocals doing that and I put a beat on top of it, and we just rapped to it." In 1999, Pearson contributed 4 songs to emerging R&B singer Terry Dexter's eponymous debut album, and two songs to Shai album Destiny.

As reported by Billboard in a February 13, 1999 article, Pearson was scheduled to release his debut solo album (titled Savior's Day) on MCA Records in the summer of 1999, immediately after a May 8 release of lead single "You Should Be With Me" featuring Mya, but the project and single were shelved for undisclosed reasons. Pearson song "How Many Times" was placed on 1999 MCA Records compilation Summer Heat Nineteen Ninety Nine - Volume One, but remains officially unreleased. Another album track, "I'll Give U All I Got" appeared on several MCA Records promotional CD Samplers sent to radio stations at the time, but also remains officially unreleased. His sole release as a solo act remains a rendition of "Silent Night" from 1999's MCA Records Compilation My Christmas Album. MCA executives planned to release Pearson's appearance as a single to various Adult Contemporary radio formats in promotion of the Christmas project.

=== 2000-Present: Later career ===
After early 2000s contributions to projects from Missy Elliott and Dru Hill, Pearson again reunited with Swing Mob producer Mosley in 2006 and entered his Mosley Music Group camp, contributing to Justin Timberlake's FutureSex/LoveSounds (credited for guitar accompaniments to number one hit "SexyBack" and album cut "Sexy Ladies"), Madonna's Hard Candy (guitar credits on "Dance 2Night"), Chris Cornell's 2009 album Scream (various instruments), co-writing "Grown Woman" alongside Mosley for Beyoncé's Pepsi campaign in 2013, and co-writing "Pray" from Sam Smith's 2017 album The Thrill of It All. In 2016, Pearson, alongside greiBO Entertainment co-producer Davis Grei, produced a video using images from Jermaine UniqueEye, Christopher Ervin and others to capture the 2015 Baltimore protests, winning a bronze Telly Award in the "music video" and "social responsibility" categories. In 2022, Pearson co-wrote "Plenty Love", a song performed by Bri Steeves representing Pennsylvania on television series American Song Contest.

== Songwriting, instrumental, and production credits ==
Credits are courtesy of Tidal and Discogs.

Title	Year	Artist	Album	Label
"This Time"	1991	Georgio	Non-album single	RCA Records
"I See Love"	1992	CeCe Peniston	Finally	A&M Records
"I Don't Want to Do Anything" (Featuring K-Ci)	1992	Mary J. Blige	What's the 411?	Uptown Records / MCA Records
"Please, Please, Please"	1992	Christopher Williams	Changes	Uptown Records / MCA Records
"Let's Go Through the Motions"	1993	Jodeci	Who's the Man? (soundtrack)	Uptown Records / MCA Records
"Can U Get wit It"	1994	Usher	Usher	LaFace Records / Arista Records
"Whispers"	1994	Usher	Usher	LaFace Records / Arista Records
"Come On Over Tonight"	1994	1-900	One Nine Hundred	SOLAR / CD Records
"I've Never Felt"	1994	1-900	One Nine Hundred	SOLAR / CD Records
"How Could You Stay Away"	1994	1-900	One Nine Hundred	SOLAR / CD Records
"Dream Dreams" (Featuring Tornado)	1994	1-900	One Nine Hundred	SOLAR / CD Records
"In Love With You"	1994	1-900	One Nine Hundred	SOLAR / CD Records
"Part Time Lover"	1994	H-Town	Above the Rim (soundtrack)	Death Row / Interscope Records
"Secret Admirer"	1994	Sista	4 All the Sistas Around da World	Swing Mob / Elektra Records
"No One Else"	1994	Mary J. Blige	My Life	Uptown Records / MCA Records
"Get On Up"	1995	Jodeci	The Show, the After Party, the Hotel	Uptown Records / MCA Records
"Freek'n You"	1995	Jodeci	The Show, the After Party, the Hotel	Uptown Records / MCA Records
"Time & Place"	1995	Jodeci	The Show, the After Party, the Hotel	Uptown Records / MCA Records
"Love U 4 Life"	1995	Jodeci	The Show, the After Party, the Hotel	Uptown Records / MCA Records
"Slave"	1995	Tony Thompson	Sexsational	Giant Records (Warner)
"Do You Wanna Ride?"	1995	Adina Howard	Do You Wanna Ride?	East West Records
"So Special"	1996	Dru Hill	Dru Hill	Island Records
"Before I Lay (You Drive Me Crazy)" (With JoJo Hailey)	1996	CeCe Peniston	I'm Movin' On	A&M Records
"April"	1996	Born In August	Timeless Journey (Shelved)	ByStorm / Universal Records
"Sexual Needs"	1997	Adina Howard	Welcome to Fantasy Island	Rhino / Elektra Records
"What About Us" (Featuring Missy Elliott & Timbaland)	1997	Total	Soul Food (soundtrack)	LaFace Records
"What Cha Say"	1998	Mya	Mya	University / Interscope Records
"Movin' On"	1998	Mya	Mya	University / Interscope Records
"Keep On Lovin' Me"	1998	Mya	Mya	University / Interscope Records
"It's All About Me" (Featuring Sisqó)	1998	Mya	Mya	University / Interscope Records
"We're Gonna Make Ya Dance"	1998	Mya	Mya	University / Interscope Records
"Bye Bye" (Featuring Missy Elliott)	1998	Mya	Mya	University / Interscope Records
"If You Died I Wouldn't Cry Cause You Never Loved Me Anyway"	1998	Mya	Mya	University / Interscope Records
"Movin' On Remix" (Featuring Silkk the Shocker)	1998	Mya	Mya	University / Interscope Records
"Trippin'"	1998	Total	Kima, Keisha, and Pam	Bad Boy / Arista Records
"I Tried"	1998	Total	Kima, Keisha, and Pam	Bad Boy / Arista Records
"Move Too Fast"	1998	Total	Kima, Keisha, and Pam	Bad Boy / Arista Records
"Getting Over"	1998	Janita	Janita (Shelved)	550 Music / Epic Records
"If There's Anything That I Can Do"	1998	Janita	Janita (Shelved)	550 Music / Epic Records
"Nice And Easy"	1998	Janita	Janita (Shelved)	550 Music / Epic Records
"You'll Never Miss Me ('Til I'm Gone)"	1999	Terry Dexter	Terry Dexter	Warner Bros. Records
"Anything"	1999	Terry Dexter	Terry Dexter	Warner Bros. Records
"I Love You"	1999	Terry Dexter	Terry Dexter	Warner Bros. Records
"Yeah"	1999	Terry Dexter	Terry Dexter	Warner Bros. Records
"For the First Time"	1999	Mya	Fear of Flying	University / Interscope Records
"Before I Go"	1999	Shai	Destiny	Big Play Records
"You Got Me Twisted"	1999	Shai	Destiny	Big Play Records
"Fee Fie Foe Fum"	1999	K-Ci & JoJo	It's Real	MCA Records
"What Am I Gonna Do"	1999	K-Ci & JoJo	It's Real	MCA Records
"How Long Must I Cry"	1999	K-Ci & JoJo	It's Real	MCA Records
"Light My Fire"	1999	Melky Sedeck	Sister & Brother (UK Edition)	MCA Records
"You Don't Know" (Featuring Lil' Mo)	2000	Missy Elliott	Da Real World	The Goldmind Inc. / Elektra Records
"Love/Hate"	2002	Dru Hill	Dru World Order	Def Soul
"Xstacy Jones"	2002	Dru Hill	Dru World Order	Def Soul
"She Said" (Featuring Chinky of LovHer)	2002	Dru Hill	Dru World Order	Def Soul
"SexyBack"	2006	Justin Timberlake	FutureSex/LoveSounds	Jive Records / Zomba
"Sexy Ladies"	2006	Justin Timberlake	FutureSex/LoveSounds	Jive Records / Zomba
"Intro - The Autobiography"	2007	Digital Black	The Autobiography of Benjamin Bush	Elite Muzic
"I Want U"	2007	Digital Black	The Autobiography of Benjamin Bush	Elite Muzic
"Window Pane"	2007	Digital Black	The Autobiography of Benjamin Bush	Elite Muzic
"After I"	2007	Digital Black	The Autobiography of Benjamin Bush	Elite Muzic
"Dance 2Night"	2008	Madonna	Hard Candy	Warner Bros. Records
"Part of Me"	2009	Chris Cornell	Scream	Mosley Music Group / Suretone Records
"Long Gone"	2009	Chris Cornell	Scream	Mosley Music Group / Suretone Records
"Watch Out"	2009	Chris Cornell	Scream	Mosley Music Group / Suretone Records
"So Bad" (Unreleased)	2010	Monica	Still Standing	J Records
"Grown Woman"	2013	Beyoncé	Non-album single	Parkwood / Columbia Records
"Victim" (With Dru Hill)	2015	Sisqó	Last Dragon	Massenburg / Dragon Music
"Pray"	2017	Sam Smith	The Thrill of It All	Capitol Records
"Cubicle" (Featuring 03 Greedo)	2018	Buddy	Harlan & Alondra	RCA Records
"Big Homie Rules"	2020	Yo Gotti	Untrapped	CMG / Roc Nation / Epic Records
"Plenty Love"	2022	Bri Steves	American Song Contest	Atlantic Records
"Should've Wore a Bonnet" (with Brent Faiyaz)	2024	21 Savage	American Dream	Slaughter Gang / Epic Records

=== Guest appearances ===
List of guest appearances, showing year released and album name
Title	Year	Other performer(s)	Album
"I've Got A Love Jones For You"	1997	Melky Sedeck, Refugee Camp All-Stars	Love Jones (Soundtrack)
"Here We Come"	1998	Timbaland & Magoo, Missy Elliott	Tim's Bio: Life from da Bassment
"Lady"	1999	Melky Sedeck	Sister & Brother
"How Many Times"	1999		MCA Presents: Summer Heat Nineteen Ninety Nine - Volume One
"I'll Give U All I Got"	1999		VIBE Magazine and Let's Jam Present: Music To Your Hair
"Silent Night"	1999		MCA Presents: My Christmas Album

=== Full Guitar Projects ===
Albums with more than 95% Darryl Pearson Guitar credits, showing year released and album name
Album	Artist	Year	Label
Diary of a Mad Band	Jodeci	1993	Uptown / MCA Records
Usher	Usher	1994	LaFace / Arista Records
4 All the Sistas Around da World	Sista	1994	Swing Mob / Elektra Records

=== Unreleased Productions ===
° Ginuwine - Untitled Shelved 1995/1996 Debut Album (Da Bassment / Elecktra)

- "Lady"
- "Yeah Come On"
- "Rock"
- "Feel It"
- "Come On Baby"
- "Soaking Wet"
- "Straight Like That"
- "One Reason Why"
- "Come Inside"
- "I'm Going To Fall In Love"

° Renee Anderson - Untitled Shelved 1997 Debut Album (Da Bassment / EMI Publishing)

- "Maybe"
- "Makin Love"

== Awards and nominations ==
Year	Work	Award	Result	Ref
1994	ASCAP Rhythm & Soul Awards	Award-Winning Songs (Part Time Lover / I'm Still In Love With You)	Won	
1999	ASCAP Rhythm & Soul Awards	Award-Winning Songs (Movin' On)	Won	
