= Mya (album) =

Studio album by Mya
- Released: April 21, 1998
- Studios: Sigma Sound, Philadelphia, Pennsylvania; Silent Sound, Atlanta, Georgia
- Genre: R&B
- Length: 57:24
- Labels: University; Interscope
- Producers: Alex "Cat" Cantrall; Myron; Nokio the N-Tity; Joey P.; Darryl "Day" Pearson; Daryl Simmons; Sisqó

Mya chronology
Mya (1998)	Fear of Flying (2000)

Singles from Mya
- 1. "It's All About Me" Released: March 10, 1998; 2. "Movin' On" Released: July 28, 1998; 3. "My First Night with You" Released: February 16, 1999

Mya (stylized as Mýa) is the debut album by American singer Mya. It was released by University Music Entertainment and Interscope Records on April 21, 1998, in the United States. The recording of the contemporary R&B album was overseen by University Records CEO A. Haqq Islam after he signed the singer when she was at the age of 15. The production on Mya was primarily handled by Swing Mob member Darryl Pearson with additional contributions from Daryl Simmons, Alex "Cat" Cantrall, Joey Priolo, and Nokio the N-Tity. Guest appearances include Dru Hill frontman Sisqó, and rappers Silkk the Shocker and Missy Elliott.

The album received generally favorable reviews from music critics, who complimented Mya's vocals and songwriting abilities, as well as the album's well-crafted appeal. Mya peaked at number 29 on the US Billboard 200 and was certified platinum by the Recording Industry Association of America (RIAA), selling over 1.6 million copies in the United States. The album spawned three singles; "It's All About Me" (featuring Sisqó), "Movin' On" (featuring Silkk the Shocker), and the Diane Warren/Babyface-penned ballad "My First Night with You". In the midst of the album's success, Mya earned several accolades, including an NAACP Image Award nomination and two Soul Train Music Award nominations.

In April 2023, to commemorate the album's twenty-fifth anniversary, Universal Music Group released a digital deluxe 25th anniversary edition featuring six songs previously unavailable on DSPs.

== Background ==
As a young child, Mya was an accomplished dancer who trained with Savion Glover and Gregory Hines and had performed at the Dance Theater of Harlem. At the age of 15, however, she decided to switch focus to a music career instead. She shopped demos to several labels and was signed by A. Haqq Islam to Interscope Records.

== Development and recording ==
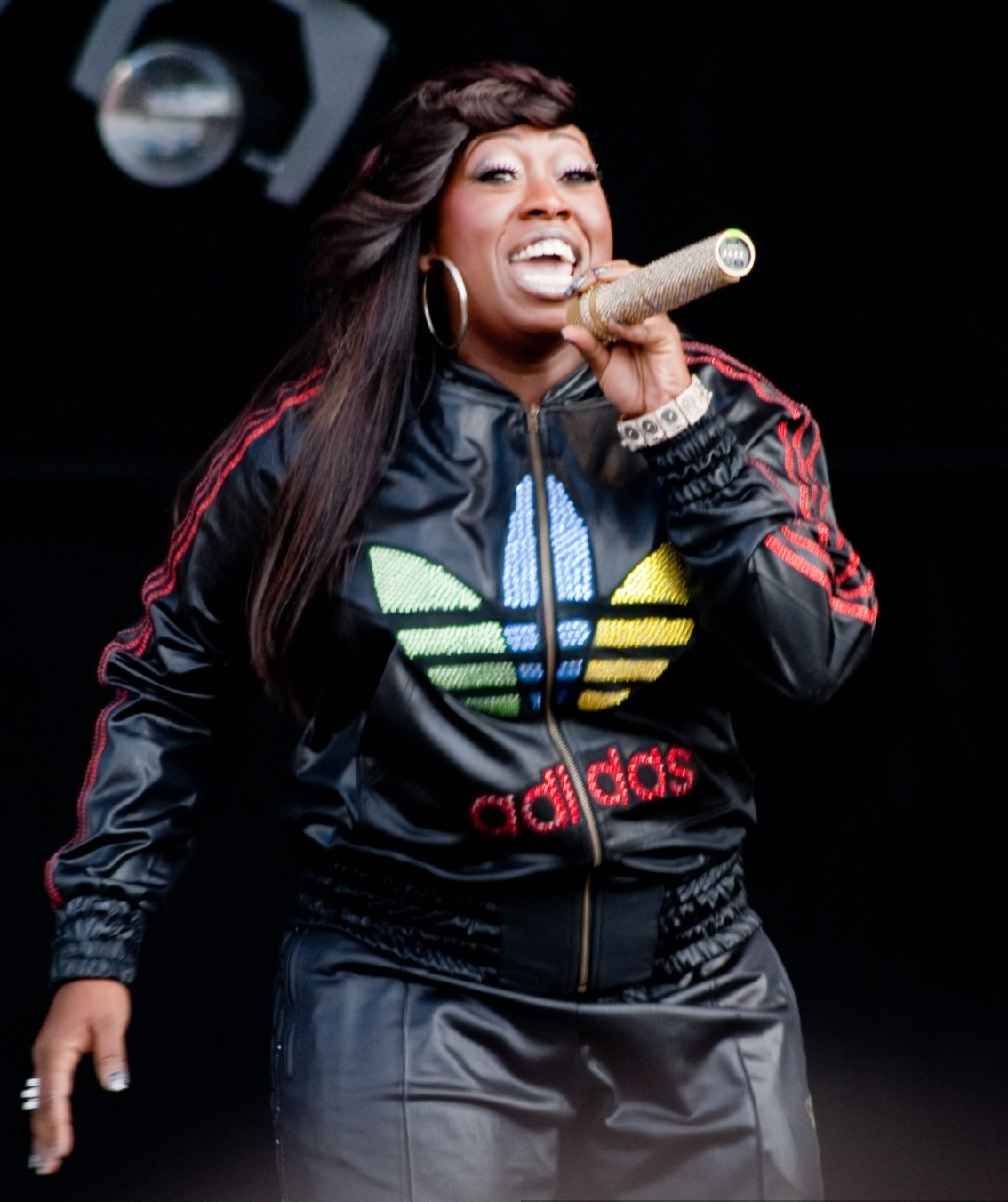
Rapper Missy "Misdemeanor" Elliott (pictured) appeared on the album.

Islam often referred to Mya as "his Diana Ross", commenting that "she has a vocal ability that can be heard in a room full of singers; her flow is tantamount to a rapper." Islam sought to mold Mya into a recording star. He explained that his label "were going after the Madonna/Janet Jackson spot, dance and pop", while also taking inspiration from the teen R&B singers Brandy, Aaliyah and Monica. According to Islam, his idea was to put together an album "that spoke to the hurt, pains, needs and desires of today's youth—falling in love, being in love, discovering love, falling out of love, not having love, being hurt. We knew if we did that accurately, young women and people of all ages and genders would identify with it."

Recorded in New York, Philadelphia, and Atlanta, Mya and Interscope spent the next two years working on her debut album. Due to his rising connections within the industry, Islam was able to hire an elite team of collaborators, including Dru Hill, another University act, rapper Missy "Misdemeanor" Elliott, and musicians such as Darryl Pearson, Diane Warren and Babyface. Commenting on the album's nature, Mya elaborated that it "speaks mostly to men and that many of the songs offer variety of messages." She also noted that album is "lady-like" and done in a "tasteful" way, leaving some things to the imagination; rather than trying to sound vulgar or explicit. The singer co-wrote many of the songs on the album, including "If You Died I Wouldn't Cry Cause You Never Loved Me Anyway", where she puts a voice to the gut-wrenching pain some woman feel at the end of a relationship. In the song, Mýa sings of wanting a man to "die" because "he never loved her anyway." She said, "the song is about saying things in anger, but being able to learn from mistakes." Another ballad, "My First Night with You", is about a non-sexual experience with a man, written by Babyface and produced by Daryl Simmons. "Bye Bye", which features Elliott was written by Mýa and Pearson. Other songs included on the album were the dance-oriented "We're Goin Make Ya Dance and "What Cha Say", a song Mya wrote by herself.

== Music and lyrics ==
An R&B album, Mya comprises 12 tracks and encompasses smooth R&B ballads, strong hip-hop raps and funky danceable tunes. A coming-of-age record characterized as "sleek" and "funky" about relationships; its subjects ranges from self centeredness, hate, happiness, self-acceptance, and love while exploring scenarios of being young, throwing parties, getting hurting for the first time, and hating someone for leaving because it hurts so much. In essence, the album's focal point is about taking control, saying goodbyes and moving on when you're done.

Mya opens with the "upbeat" opening track "What Cha Say," a self-penned song built around a deep, rubbery baseline. It is followed by the "wildy contagious, funk-fortified jeep jam" and album's second single "Movin' On," a song where Mya informs her man that she knows he is cheating and is "movin' on" to bigger and better things. Next up, the "cuddly" ballad and album's third track "Baby It's Yours." Glistened with an acoustic guitar and a slow programmed drumbeat, the ballad is in reminiscent of the earlier music of Janet Jackson. Produced by key collaborator Darryl Pearson, "Keep On Lovin' Me" serves as the album's fourth track and samples Love Unlimited Orchestra's "I Did It For Love." Written by Dru Hill frontman Sisqo, "It's All About Me" is the album's first single and "centerpiece." It is a "seductive" psychedelic R&B slow jam, rhythm-driven duet in which Mya plays a dominant, confident sex object. She informs a lover it's up to him to please her and asks the question many women won't ask, "Are you gonna get it up?" Joined by Sisqo, he croons on the bridges and ad-libs on the verses, his vocal performance is compared to the vocal work of Jodeci's K-Ci Hailey. A signature song within her discography, the duet and their chemistry has been branded "undeniable." Having one of the longest names for a song, the "curiously ambivalent" "If You Died I Wouldn't Cry Caused You Never Loved Me Anyway," serves as the album's sixth track. Produced by Nokio the N-Tity of Dru Hill, "If You Died I Wouldn't Cry Caused You Never Loved Me Anyway," is a tune about finding the strength in yourself to let go of a person who means you harm. Dru Hill provides background vocals as well.

It is followed by the "funky," "butt-shakin'," "finger snappin" ditty, "We're Gonna Make Ya Dance." In contrast to track seven, "If You Were Mine," the album's eighth track is a soft and mellow midtempo perfect for "slow dancing." Full of "spunk" and "edge" with its hard beats and scratch effects, the "excellent femme fatale tour-de-force Darryl Pearson-produced "Bye Bye," a song about being strong and moving on serves as the album's ninth track. Featuring Missy Elliott, Elliott does her trademark sounds effects. "Anytime You Want Me" and "Don't Be Afraid" serves as album's tenth and eleventh tracks. Closing the album is the "soothing" ballad "My First Night with You," a "tender" beautifully arranged Babyface/Diane Warren penned tune about a non-sexual experience with a significant other. The album's third and final single, the album's version it is built around a keyboard and drum machine produced by Daryl Simmons and compared to the vocal works of Faith Evans and Karyn White.

== Release and promotion ==
In April 1998, Interscope held a press release for Mya, with Billboard magazine promoting. At the time of the press release, University Music revealed and shared details regarding Mya's project and University Music's marketing strategy plan, announcing the album and US single release dates. Although Mya was initially slated for a May 5, 1998, release date, it was later changed to April 21. However, an international release date for the album was not set. Mya's first single "It's All About Me" featuring Sisqó was solicited to radio March 3 and released commercially March 10. The music video for "It's All About Me" was serviced to BET and The Box on February 10. It was serviced to MTV at a later date.

From the beginning, University and Interscope used Mya's connection to labelmates Dru Hill as a promotional tool. To create a buzz for Mya, University coupled her with Dru Hill in video and television appearances as an outlet to create a fan base for her. In addition to video and television appearances, Mya was featured on Puff Daddy's concert tour which also included Dru Hill. To continue to create an ongoing buzz for herself, she opened the boy group Boyz II Men tour from April 26 to July 26. As a marketing plan, University announced and created a grass-roots campaign that hit high schools. The label distributed newsletters about Mya hitting more than 25,000 high schools nationally. University also set up a Mya 900 number which was advertised on posters and fliers. Callers could hear samples of Mya's music and hear the latest on her activities. On the press front, Mya appeared on the cover of Right On! and Teen People magazines. In late April, Mya appeared and performed "It's All About Me" on Vibe. Lastly, she was featured on Interscope's worldwide website, where she had her own page.

=== Singles ===
Mya's debut album produced three singles. Lead single "It's All About Me", a duet with singer Sisqó, peaked at number six on Billboard Hot 100 and number two on Hot R&B/Hip-Hop Songs chart, marking Mya's first top 10 entry as a solo artist. It was later certified gold by the Recording Industry Association of America (RIAA). A moderate international success, it peaked in the top 20 on the New Zealand Singles Chart and the top 40 on the Canadian Singles Chart. A remix version of "Movin' On", featuring additional vocals from rapper Silkk the Shocker", was released as the album's second single. It reached number 11 in New Zealand, number 34 on the Billboard Hot 100, and number four on Hot R&B/Hip-Hop Songs chart. The album's third and final single, a cover of Deborah Cox's 1995 song "My First Night with You", peaked at number 28 on both the Billboard Hot 100 and the Hot R&B/Hip-Hop Songs chart.

== Critical reception ==
Professional ratings
Review scores
Source	Rating
AllMusic	4/5 stars

Mya received generally positive reviews from music critics. AllMusic editor Stephen Thomas Erlewine called the album a "thoroughly promising debut" that compromises "a fine set of songs that manage to sound universal and strangely confessional", while describing it as "a smooth, sultry collection of well-crafted contemporary urban soul that is actually richer than the average urban record the late '90s." In his review for The Washington Post, journalist Richard Harrington wrote that Mya made "a strong first impression with her own eponymous debut."

Paul Verna of Billboard found that Mya "scored on her debut album by addressing issues of concern to women without spewing cuss words." He compared the material to R&B band Destiny's Child and complimented Mya's songwriting skills, ranking "It's All About Me", "Whatcha Say", "Bye Bye", "My First Night With You", "Movin' On", and "We're Gonna Make Ya Dance" among the album's noteworthy tracks. Ayana B. Byrd of Vibe expressed that on Mya, the "Washington, D.C. native always sings with a voice that is clear, strong, and assured", adding that the album combined "round-the-way girl sass with an artist's sensibility." Jessica Simmons of The Michigan Daily described the album in one phrase:"OK, but nothing special" and noted aside from a few select songs like "Baby It's Yours" and "If You Were Mines," — "the rest are easily forgettable." She concluded her review with despite Mya having "a nice singing voice," the singer's debut offering "misses the mark." Portsmouth Daily Times associated writer Nekesa Moody opined the singer "shines on her self-titled debut despite being bogged down occasionally with some run-of-the-mill material."

=== Accolades ===
Mya and its singles earned the singer numerous nominations. In 1998, she received her first award nomination for a Soul Train Lady of Soul Award in the Best R&B/Soul or Rap New Artist category. The following year, Mya continued to score multiple award nominations. Mya earned two Soul Train Music Awards nominations for Best R&B/Soul or Rap New Artist and Best R&B/Soul Album – Female. At 1999 NAACP Image Awards, she received a nomination for Outstanding New Artist. Mya scored a New R&B/Hip-Hop Artist of the Year nomination at Billboard Music Awards. Her single, "Movin' On" earned her a second nomination at the 1999 Soul Train Lady of Soul awards for Best R&B/Soul Song of the Year. For the 1999 Source Hip-Hop Music Awards, she received a nomination for R&B Artist of the Year.

== Commercial performance ==
Mya debuted at number 77 on the Billboard 200 on May 9, 1998. A steady seller, by May 22, 1998, in its fourth week, Mya had sold 220,000 copies. The album eventually peaked at number 29 on the Billboard 200 and at number 13 on Billboard's Top R&B/Hip Hop Albums chart during the weeks of September 5 and July 14, 1998, respectively. During the holiday season of 1998, Mya experienced its biggest single-week of sales, scanning 64,858 units. It was certified platinum by the Recording Industry Association of America on October 1, 1998. In January 1999, the album was ranked as the 75th best-selling album of 1998 in the United States, selling 1.1 million copies. By May 2003, Mya had sold over 1.4 million copies in the US. As of April 2023, Mya has sold 1.6 million units stateside. By May 18, 2001, worldwide sales for Mya stood at six million copies sold combined with sales from Fear of Flying (2000).

== Legacy ==
"University/Interscope vocalist Mya became one of 98's fastest-rising stars."

— Anita M. Samuels reflects on Mya's prosperous year.

With the release and success of her debut album and its singles, Mya established herself a successful solo recording artist. Anita M. Samuels of Billboard commented, "The vocalist/dancer was introduced to R&B audiences via Sisqo of Dru Hill with the single, "It's All About Me," making her a viable competitor with artists such as Aaliyah." Right from the beginning, MTV embraced Mya and her singles "It's All About Me" and "Movin' On." Additionally, MTV heavily went into rotation on two film-related songs on which Mya was the featured vocalist, including Pras's "Ghetto Supastar" from Bulworth and Blackstreet's "Take Me There" from The Rugrats Movie. Sharing her opinion on Harrison's success, author Stacy-Deanne expressed, "With strong R&B vocals and super hip-hop tracks, Mya was labeled the new "Ghetto Princess" – she was the new "it" girl." Complex magazine recognized "Movin' On" as one of the Best R&B Videos of the '90s. In a poll conducted by Billboard, "Movin' On" ranked 10th on its list of the 20 Best High School Music Videos. Actor and singer Rotimi sampled "Movin' On" for his five-track Summer Bangerz EP. In honor its twentieth anniversary, Vibe ranked the album's tracks from worst to first and commented, "Mýa remains one of the definitive R&B albums of its era, is regarded as a certified classic and will always be remembered as the music world's introduction to its creator." Billboard acknowledged the album track "Bye Bye" featuring Missy Elliott and ranked it at number 47 on their 50 Greatest Deep Cuts of 1998 list. In honor of her twenty-fifth anniversary, Mya released "It's All About Me (25th Anniversary Remix)," a heel choreographed music video version. Directed and choreographed by Brian Friedman, it features the singer dancing solo in heels with a mixture of desire and self-assurance.

== Track listing ==
Mya – Standard edition
No.	Title	Writer(s)	Producer(s)	Length
1.	"What Cha Say"	Mya Harrison; Darryl "Day" Pearson	Pearson	3:55
2.	"Movin' On"	Harrison; Pearson; Mark Andrews	Pearson	4:29
3.	"Baby It's Yours"	Alex Cantrall; Myron Davis	Cantrall	4:29
4.	"Keep On Lovin' Me"	Pearson; Andrews; Larry "Jazz" Anthony; N. Neka	Pearson	3:46
5.	"It's All About Me" (featuring Sisqó)	Pearson; Andrews	Pearson	4:26
6.	"If You Died I Wouldn't Cry Cause You Never Loved Me Anyway"	James "Woody" Green; R. Brown; Tamir Ruffin	Nokio the N-Tity	5:02
7.	"We're Gonna Make Ya Dance"	Harrison; Pearson; Ruffin	Pearson; Nokio the N-Tity	4:23
8.	"If You Were Mine"	Cantrall; Davis	Cantrall	4:17
9.	"Bye Bye" (featuring Missy "Misdemeanor" Elliott)	Harrison; Pearson; Melissa Elliott	Pearson	4:05
10.	"Anytime You Want Me"	Cantrall; Joey Priolo; Carl Carr	Cantrall; Joey P.	3:40
11.	"Don't Be Afraid"	Cantrall; Priolo	Cantrall; Joey P.	4:46
12.	"My First Night with You"	Kenneth Edmonds; Diane Warren	Daryl Simmons	5:38
13.	"Movin' On (Remix)" (featuring Silkk the Shocker)	Harrison; Pearson; Andrews; Vyshonn Miller	Pearson; A. Haqq Islam	4:30

Mya – Special edition U.K. edition
No.	Title	Writer(s)	Producer(s)	Length
1.	"What Cha Say"	Harrison; Pearson	Pearson	3:55
2.	"Movin' On" (featuring Silkk the Shocker)	Harrison; Pearson; Andrews; Miller	Pearson; Islam	4:30
3.	"Baby It's Yours"	Cantrall; Davis	Cantrall	4:29
4.	"Keep On Lovin' Me"	Pearson; Andrews; Anthony; Neka	Pearson	3:46
5.	"It's All About Me" (featuring Sisqó)	Pearson; Andrews	Pearson	4:26
6.	"If You Died I Wouldn't Cry Cause You Never Loved Me Anyway"	Green; Brown; Ruffin	Nokio the N-Tity	5:02
7.	"We're Gonna Make Ya Dance"	Harrison; Pearson; Ruffin	Pearson; Nokio the N-Tity	4:23
8.	"If You Were Mine"	Cantrall; Davis	Cantrall	4:17
9.	"Bye Bye" (featuring Missy Elliott)	Harrison; Pearson; Elliott	Pearson	4:05
10.	"Anytime You Want Me"	Cantrall; Priolo; Carr	Cantrall; Joey P.	3:40
11.	"Don't Be Afraid"	Cantrall; Priolo	Cantrall; Joey P.	4:46
12.	"My First Night with You" (The Ric Wake Mix)	Edmonds; Warren	Ric Wake	4:30
13.	"Movin' On" (Fernando Club Mix)	Harrison; Pearson; Andrews	Fernando Garibay; Rene Van Verseveld	4:56
14.	"Movin' On" (University Mix Dirty Version)	Jerome "Knobody" Foster; Cristal M. Johnson; Harrison; Corey Woods; Victor James Santiago Jr; Imani Proudie	Jerome "Knobody" Foster	5:09
15.	"It's All About Me" (The Slammin Sam Wild Wesside Mix)	Pearson; Andrews	Pearson; Slammin' Sam Maxion^{[a]}	4:40

Mya – 25th anniversary edition bonus tracks
No.	Title	Writer(s)	Producer(s)	Length
14.	"It's All About Me" (25th Anniversary Remix)	Pearson; Andrews	Pearson; Sean "Smiles" Miles^{[b]}; Davel "Bo" McKenzie^{[b]}; Mýa^{[b]}	2:56
15.	"It's All About Me" (New R&B Remix)	Pearson; Andrews	Pearson	3:43
16.	"My First Night with You" (Spanish Version)	Edmonds; Warren	Ric Wake; K.C. Porter; Aureo Baqueiro	4:23
17.	"Movin' On (Remix)" (Sped Up Version)	Harrison; Pearson; Andrews; Miller	Pearson; A. Haqq Islam; All Star	4:00
18.	"It's All About Me" (Sped Up Version)	Pearson; Andrews	Pearson	3:44

Notes

- ^{^[a]} signifies a remixer
- ^{^[b]} signifies a co-producer

Sample credits

- "Keep On Lovin' Me" samples "I Did It for Love" by Love Unlimited.
- "It's All About Me" contains an interpolation of "Moments in Love" by Art of Noise.
- "Movin' Out" contain elements from "Wishing on a Star" by Rose Royce.
- "Movin' Out" contains a sample from "Love Is Alive" by Gary Wright.

== Personnel ==
Credits adapted from the liner notes of Mya.

Performers and musicians

- Mya – background vocals
- Dru Hill – background vocals
- Joey P. – acoustic guitar, bass guitar, electric guitar, strings
- Randy Bowland – guitar
- Ronnie Garrett – bass
- Darryl Simmons – drum programming, keyboard programming
- Silkk the Shocker – performer

Technical

- A. Haqq Islam – executive production
- Daven Baptiste – artwork, design
- Darryl Pearson – production, vocal arrangement
- Eldren Hughes – artwork, design
- Fred – mixing assistance
- Gordon Rice – engineering
- Ivy Skoff – production coordination
- Jason Webb – engineering assistance, mixing assistance
- Kevin Lively – engineering assistance

== Charts ==
=== Weekly charts ===
Weekly chart performance
Chart (1998)	Peak position
US Billboard 200	29
US Top R&B/Hip-Hop Albums (Billboard)	13

=== Year-end charts ===
Year-end chart performance
Chart (1998)	Position
Canadian R&B Albums (SoundScan)	61
US Billboard 200	87
US Top R&B/Hip-Hop Albums (Billboard)	43
Chart (1999)	Position
US Billboard 200	200

== Certifications and sales ==
Certifications and sales
Region	Certification	Certified units/sales
United States (RIAA)	Platinum	1,600,000
Summaries
Worldwide	—	2,000,000

== Release history ==
Release dates and formats
Region	Date	Format	Label
Canada	April 21, 1998	CD; LP; cassette	Universal
United States	April 21, 1998	CD; LP; cassette	University; Interscope
Germany	April 28, 1998	CD	Universal
Japan	June 24, 1998	CD	Universal
United Kingdom	July 6, 1998	CD	Interscope
Worldwide (25th Anniversary Edition)	April 28, 2023	Digital download; streaming	Universal Music Group
