= Handsfree (song) =

Single by Mya featuring Ding Dong
- Released: June 19, 2019
- Genre: Riddim
- Length: 3:36
- Label: StadicBlaze
- Songwriter: Zan
- Producers: Jonny Blaze; Stadic; DJ Perf

Mya singles chronology
"Open" (2019)	"Handsfree" (2019)	"You Got Me, Part II" (2020)

"Handsfree" is a song recorded by American singer Mya featuring Dancehall recording artist Ding Dong. A "bouncy" riddim song, it was written by songwriter Zan with production courtesy of Jonny Blaze, Stadic, and DJ Perf. As a standalone single, "Handsfree" was released in June 2019 and is one of a handful of tracks featured on producer Jonny Blaze's Sexting Riddim compilation album. Upon release, the song received a positive response from critics and music fans alike. An accompanying music video followed which was produced and filmed in Kingston, Jamaica.

== Background and composition ==
"Handsfree" is one of a handful of releases featured on the Jonny Blaze–produced Sexting Riddim. Speaking with Sajae Elder of magazine The Fader – via email, the singer addressed her decision on why she chose to record the song writing, "What always draws me back to the Caribbean vibes are the upbeat vibrations of welcoming melodies & positive energy exchange through the rhythms that make you feel like dancing WITH someone, while also commenting in her email, "No matter the genre, music is a universal language & vibration that people can feel all over."

"Handsfree" was constructed around the "Caribbean" genres with a runtime of three minutes and thirty-six seconds. Written by songwriter Zan with production helmed by producers Jonny Blaze, Stadic, and DJ Perf, "Handsfree" is a "bouncy" riddim song performed in the key of E minor set with a common time of 100 beats per minute.

== Music video ==
=== Background ===
To fully complement the song and its accompanying project, a music video was commissioned. During a visit to the set, Mýa briefly chatted with writer Stephanie Lyew of The Star on their decision to film a music video, commenting, "We both felt the same way about the song when we heard the complete version and decided it deserved a music video." For an authentic experience, Mýa opted to film her scenes in Kingston, Jamaica, commenting, "The roots of the song embody Caribbean vibes – Jamaican vibes to be exact – it is always better to be authentic and true to the culture rather than imitating it." Directed by local natives Steven "Streetz" Bernard and Sadiki Thompson, Mýa recorded her solo scenes in Portland early Monday morning while her and featured artist Ding Dong met up in the streets of downtown Kingston to shoot the party scene. At the time of production, the directors and Ding Dong were currently scouting locations to record Ding Dong's solo screentime scenes. Though no release date was given during production, both artists anticipated to release the music video during the summer.

=== Synopsis ===
The music video opens with a beautiful, serene island setting. Sporting a long redish orange wig and a floral robe attire, Mýa chills and sing on her balcony overlooking the beach. Next, she links up with a couple of girlfriends to frolic and have fun on the beach before hooking up with Ding Dong at a hot and sweaty club later that night where they both talk their ish.

== Credits and personnel ==
Credits adapted from Sexting Riddim liner notes.

- Mýa – vocals
- Ding Dong – vocals
- Jonny Blaze – production
- Stadic – production
- DJ Perf – production

== Release history ==
Region	Date	Format	Label	Ref.
Various	June 19, 2019	Digital download; streaming	Jonny Blaze; Stadic	
