= My First Night with You =

Single by Mýa

from the album Mýa
- Released: February 16, 1999
- Studio: Silent Sounds Studios (Atlanta, Georgia)
- Genre: Pop; R&B
- Length: 5:38 (album version)
- Label: Interscope
- Songwriters: Kenneth "Babyface" Edmonds; Diane Warren
- Producers: Daryl Simmons; Ric Wake

Mýa singles chronology
"Somebody Like Me" (1999)	"My First Night with You" (1999)	"The Best of Me" (2000)

Music video
- "My First Night with You" on YouTube

"My First Night with You" is a song written by Kenneth "Babyface" Edmonds and Diane Warren. It was originally recorded by Canadian singer Deborah Cox for her self-titled debut studio album (1995). In 1998, American singer Mýa covered the song for her self-titled debut studio album, serving as the album's third and final single. The album version was produced by Daryl Simmons, allowing Mýa to put her own spin on the record, while the Ric Wake pop-produced version was marketed at pop and adult contemporary radio. The lyrics of the ballad speak of a non-sexual experience with a man.

The song received generally mixed reviews from contemporary music critics, some of whom were divided over Mýa's vocal performance. "My First Night with You" peaked at number 28 on both the US Billboard Hot 100 and the Hot R&B/Hip-Hop Songs charts. The song's accompanying music video was directed by G. Thomas Ferguson and University Music CEO Haqq Islam and features appearances by actor Lawrence Hilton-Jacobs and rapper Saafir who portray Mýa's father and boyfriend, respectively.

== Composition ==
"My First Night with You" was written by Kenneth "Babyface" Edmonds and Diane Warren. The song was originally produced by Edmonds and recorded by Canadian singer Deborah Cox for her self-titled debut studio album, released by Arista Records in 1995. In 1998, American singer Mýa covered it for her self-titled debut, with producer Daryl Simmons replacing Edmonds.

The song is in the key of ab major, while its tempo is set at a moderate slow beat at 80 beats per minute in common time. Harrison's vocal range span from an Eb_{3} to Eb_{5}. The lyrics of "My First Night with You" are composed in the traditional verse-chorus form. Mýa opens the song with the first verse, followed by the chorus leading her into the second verse. The song continues to the bridge, chorus, then fades out until its run time.

== Critical reception ==
In its 1999 review, Billboard magazine gave the song a positive review, writing, "It's hard to go wrong at pop radio these days with either Diane Warren or Babyface on your side, and here the two ably join forces for a gentle love ballad about that unforgettable first night together [...] Mya's voice is not the most robust around and this song perhaps makes that clearer than before but "My First Night With You" totally works that Backstreet Boys-ballad vibe that's so hot right now. For that reason and in light of the song's universal lyric about the first touch of love, it's quite likely that the song could continue this budding artist's hot streak, even crossing her over to AC." Ayana D. Bird from Vibe called "My First Night with You" a "beautifully arranged Babyface-penned tune [that] is perfect by her sweet (but never fragile) soprano, reminiscent of Faith's." In a retrospective review of parent album Mýa, her colleague Preezy Brown described the song as "an impassioned ballad."

=== Accolades ===
Year	Ceremony	Award	Result	Ref.
1999	Washington Area Music Awards	Song of the Year	Nominated	
1999	Washington Area Music Awards	Video of the Year	Nominated	

== Chart performance ==
"My First Night with You" was released as the third single from Mýa in 1999. In the United States, it debuted at number ninety on the Billboard Hot 100 in the issue dated week of March 20, 1999. It ascended from 90 to 66 in its second week in the issue dated week of March 27, 1999. The song reached its peak at number twenty-eight in the issue dated week of April 17, 1999 ascending 46–28. It spent a total of 14 consecutive weeks on the chart and Mýa's second single with a short life span on the Hot 100 behind "Fallen" (2003) with 12 consecutive weeks. It performed equally on the Hot R&B Singles chart. The song made its debut at number eighty-nine in the week of March 13, 1999. It rose from 85 to 35 in its second week on the chart, in the week of March 20, 1999. It spent 19 consecutive weeks on the chart. "My First Night with You" reached its peak at number twenty-eight in the week of April 17, 1999. It became Mýa's third consecutive Top 40 (solo), fifth overall hit on both charts.

== Music video ==
A music video for "My First Night with You" was directed by G. Thomas Ferguson and University Music CEO Haqq Islam and produced by Geronimo Film Productions. It was filmed in March 1999 and includes appearances by actors Lawrence Hilton-Jacobs and Kathleen Bradley, who portray Mýa's parents, as well as rapper Saafir. In the video, Mýa tries to convince her father that her date is a good guy before they head out for a big night on the town. The whirlwind evening concludes with Mýa and her beau falling asleep on a beach.

== Track listings ==
US 7" / CD single
No.	Title	Writer(s)	Producer(s)	Length
1.	"My First Night with You" (Ric Wake Version)	Babyface; Diane Warren	Daryl Simmons; Ric Wake^{[A]}	4:30
2.	"Baby It's Yours" (Ric Wake Version)	Alex "Cat" Cantrall; Myron Davis	Cantrall; Davis	4:29

US maxi single
No.	Title	Writer(s)	Producer(s)	Length
1.	"My First Night with You" (Ric Wake Version)	Babyface; Warren	Simmons; Wake^{[A]}	4:30
2.	"My First Night with You" (Fernando G's Extended Vox)	Babyface; Warren	Simmons; Fernando Garibay^{[A]}	6:07
3.	"My First Night with You" (Soul Solution Extended Vox)	Babyface; Warren	Simmons; Soul Solution^{[A]}	9:56
4.	"Mi Primera Vez"	Babyface; Warren	Simmons; Wake^{[A]}; Aureo Baqueiro^{[A]}; KC Porter^{[A]}	4:30

Notes

- ^{^[A]} denotes remix producer

== Credits and personnel ==
Credits lifted from the liner notes of Mýa.

=== Recording ===
- Recorded at Silent Sound Studios (Atlanta, Georgia)
- Mixed at Brandon's Way Recording Studios (Los Angeles, California)

=== Personnel ===
- E'Lyk – mixing assistance
- Thom "TK" Kidd – engineer
- Ronnie Garrett – bass
- Jon Gass – mixing engineer
- Mýa Harrison – vocalist
- Kevin Lively – engineering assistance
- Daryl Simmons – drum programming, keyboards, producer
- Ivy Skoff – production coordinator
- Tanya "Tann" Smith – background vocalist
- P. Sound Productions – additional drum programming

== Charts ==
=== Weekly charts ===
Weekly chart performance
Chart (1999)	Peak position
US Billboard Hot 100	28
US Dance Club Songs (Billboard)	26
US Dance Singles Sales (Billboard)	13
US Hot R&B/Hip-Hop Songs (Billboard)	28
US Rhythmic Airplay (Billboard)	9

=== Year-end charts ===
Year-end chart performance
Chart (1999)	Position
US Hot R&B/Hip-Hop Songs (Billboard)	100

== Release history ==
Release dates and formats for "My First Night with You"
Region	Date	Format	Label	Ref.
United States	February 16, 1999	Rhythmic contemporary radio	Interscope	
United States	April 13, 1999	CD single	Interscope	
