= Somebody Like Me (Silkk the Shocker song) =

Single by Silkk the Shocker featuring Mýa

from the album Made Man
- Released: February 16, 1999
- Recorded: 1998
- Genre: Hip hop, R&B
- Length: 4:12
- Label: No Limit; Priority; EMI
- Songwriters: Mýa Harrison; Vyshonn Miller; The Whole 9
- Producer: Master P (exec.) The Whole 9

Silkk the Shocker singles chronology
"Movin' On" (1998)	"Somebody Like Me" (1999)	"Live or Die" (1999)

Mýa singles chronology
"Take Me There" (1999)	"Somebody Like Me" (1999)	"My First Night with You" (1999)

"Somebody Like Me"is a single by American rapper Silkk The Shocker and features singer-songwriter Mýa from Silkk's third album Made Man.The track was produced by The Whole 9 for Miller's third studio album Made Man. Somebody Like Me was written by Mýa, Vyshonn Miller and The Whole 9.

== Reception ==
Somebody Like Me was released February 16, 1999, in the United States as the second single from Miller's third studio album Made Man. The single achieved moderate success on Billboard's Hot R&B/Hip Hop Songs chart only; peaking at 43. It sold 700,000 copies.

== Music video ==
=== Background ===
Somebody Like Me was filmed on a location in Los Angeles & directed by Jesse Vaughn. During a visit to the set, Silkk talked with MTV News about the "opposites attract" message behind the video and explained why Mýa was the only girl for him ... at least in the song. Commenting, "People go through this [situation] a lot and sometimes it'll be that people's perfect matches [come from] different sides of the track. It might be a good person-bad person or a good person and a not-so-well-liked person that get together, and I think that we go through that a lot." Silkk elaborated further on the message, "So I just tried to express that with this song and I think that a lot of people are gonna appreciate the song, even if they don't go through something like that. I still think they'll appreciate it cause it's real. It ain't real between me and Mýa, it's just what we're doing up there. I just thought that she could probably help me come across on it better, so that's why I chose her for the song." MTV News confirmed Somebody Like Me was expected to begin airing in February.

== Track listing ==
=== CD ===
1. Somebody Like Me (Album Version)
2. Somebody Like Me (Radio Version)
3. It Ain't My Fault 2 (Album Version)

== Charts ==
Chart (1999)	Peak position
US Hot R&B/Hip-Hop Songs (Billboard)	43
