= It's All About Me =

Single by Mýa and Sisqó

from the album Mýa
- Released: March 10, 1998
- Recorded: 1997
- Studio: Silent Sounds Studios, Atlanta
- Genre: Psychedelic R&B
- Length: 4:26
- Label: Interscope
- Songwriters: Mark Andrews; Darryl Pearson
- Producer: Darryl "Day" Pearson

Mýa singles chronology
"It's All About Me" (1998)	"Ghetto Supastar" (1998)

Sisqó singles chronology
"It's All About Me" (1998)	"Got to Get It" (1999)

'It's All About Me' is a song by American singer Mýa. It served as her debut single from her self-titled debut studio album and recorded as a duet with R&B singer Sisqó. A psychedelic R&B slow jam, "It's All About Me" was written and composed by Sisqó and Darryl Pearson, while the latter served as producer. It interpolates the composition "Moments in Love" by Art of Noise.

Following its release, "It's All About Me" received generally mixed to positive reviews from contemporary music critics, whom compared Harrison to her contemporary peers Aaliyah, Brandy and Monica. A commercial success, "It's All About Me" became a top ten hit on the Billboard Hot 100 for the week of May 16, 1998 where it peaked and spent three consecutive weeks at number six. It fared better on the Hot R&B Singles chart, where it reached number two. Internationally, the single was a modest success; it reached the top 20 in New Zealand and top 40 in Canada.

The song's accompanying music video was filmed by director G. Thomas Ferguson and University Music CEO Haqq Islam. Given her artistic background, Harrison choreographed the dance routines and designed her own outfit - a red Chinese traditional wedding dress. The music video featured Harrison performing a strip tease and fencing with Sisqó after they meet following a concert from Sisqó's group, Dru Hill (Harrison, Sisqó, and Dru Hill were all label mates at the time on University Music).

== Background ==
Through his work with Dru Hill, Darryl Pearson was introduced to Mya through their label CEO A. Haqq Islam and subsequently the pair began working on music together. According to producer Darryl Pearson, "It's All About Me" initially didn't start out as a duet between Mya and Sisqo. Pearson explained, "Sisqo and I wrote "It's All About Me." Sisqo wrote the lyrics and I did the music, expounding, "I got Sisqo to write "It's All About Me," and he didn’t know." However, Pearson acknowledges for intentional purposes, "I left him in the second verse." As a suggestion to the label, Pearson advised, "let’s leave Sisqo on there and make it a duet." In an interview with Rolling Stone magazine, Harrison described the concept behind "It’s All About Me": "It's not a conceited thing. Basically, I'm speaking for people who are in relationships but aren't getting their fifty percent. The song is about taking control. Personally, I'm not trying to get into relationships right now. But when I do, it's fifty-fifty."

== Composition ==
Recorded in 1997, "It's All About Me" was written by Sisqo and produced by Darryl Pearson at Silent Sound Studio in Atlanta, Georgia. On top of, writing and production duties, the pair handled and were responsible for the vocal arrangements as well. While additional contribution was provided by mixing engineer Thom Kidd at Studio 56 in Los Angeles, California.

A psychedelic R&B slow jam with a runtime of four minutes and twenty-six seconds, "It's All About Me" contains a replayed sample from composition Moments in Love by Art of Noise. In a retrospective review of parent album Mýa, Vibe's Preezy Brown commented on Sisqo's and Mya chemistry, calling it "undeniable" and noted the collaboration became a signature selection within her discography.

== Critical reception ==
Billboard's Larry Flick gave "It's All About Me" a favorable review, writing, "Although It's All About Me can be too repetitive and thus unnecessarily tiring at times, it does have an interesting, catchy rhythm that's hard to miss. Undoubtedly, R&B listeners will find this highly appealing. The vocals have a great range, as well as a smooth, angelic tone. It's worth giving it a try." Writing for Spin magazine, Charles Aaron described "It's All About Me" as a "G-rated version of Lil' Kim's pussy-power politics." Music Week called "It's All About Me," a catchy R&B outing."

== Accolades ==
Year	Ceremony	Award	Result	Ref.
1998	Billboard Music Video Awards	Best New R&B/Urban Clip	Nominated	
1999	Washington Area Music Awards	Song of the Year	Nominated	
1999	Washington Area Music Awards	Video of the Year	Nominated	

Rankings for "It's All About Me"
Year	Publication	Accolade	Rank	Ref.
1998	MTV	Top 96 of 1998	77	
2013	AllMusic	R&B 40: 1998	25	
2018	Rolling Stone	The 98 Best Songs of 1998: Pop’s Weirdest Year	19	

== Chart performance ==
In the United States, It's All About Me debuted at number eighty-two on the Billboard Hot 100 chart for the issue dated week of March 14, 1998. It ascended from 82-62 in its second week for the issue dated week of March 21, 1998. The song reached its peak at number six for issue dated week of May 16, 1998. From the issue dated weeks of May 16–30, 1998; it spent 3 consecutive weeks at number six. It spent a total of 20 consecutive weeks on the chart. The single became Harrison's first U.S. Top Ten hit (solo) on the chart and certified gold by Recording Industry Association of America on June 4, 1998 selling 800,000 copies. It became a top five hit on Billboard's component Hot R&B Singles chart. It debuted at number sixty-one for the issue dated week of March 14, 1998. It rose from 61-31 in its second week for the issue dated week of March 21, 1998. "It's All About Me" entered the coveted top ten at number eight for issue dated week of April 18, 1998. It reached its peak at number two the issue dated week of May 9, 1998. The song spent a total of 27 consecutive weeks on the chart. It's All About Me remains Harrison's biggest and highest charting single to date on the Hot R&B Singles chart.

In Canada, the song reached its peak at number thirty-nine for the issue dated week of April 25, 1998. It spent a total of 6 consecutive weeks on the chart. It also debuted at number twenty-seven during the week of June 21, 1998 in New Zealand. It reached its peak at number thirteen during the week of July 19, 1998. It spent a total of 15 consecutive weeks on the chart.

== Music videos ==
A music video for "It's All About Me" was directed by G. Thomas Ferguson and Haqq Islam. It begins with Sisqó pulling Mya from a cheering crowd. He is seen taking her into a white hallway where she sings and dances while wearing red Chinese clothing. In an interview with MTV News, Mýa talked about the concept behind the video: "Sisqó pulls me out of the crowd because I guess I look uninterested, and that's not common, y'know to have people uninterested in such big stars. So, he pulls me out thinking he's gonna make me his lady of the night." "Through the dance and the whole video," she continued, "I tease him and say, 'No, I'm not that kind of girl and if you wanna be with me, you have to make it all about me.'"

In honor of her twenty-fifth anniversary, Mya released "It's All About Me (25th Anniversary Remix)," a heel choreographed music video version. Directed and choreographed by Brian Friedman, it features the singer dancing solo in heels with a mixture of desire and self-assurance. Speaking on their collaboration, Mya shared with Rated R&B: "It was a complete full circle moment working with the incredibly dynamic Brian Friedman. We share a history of unforgettable moments, and I couldn’t be more thrilled for our 25th anniversary collaboration." Equally, excited about their collaboration as well, Friedman commented, "I was thrilled to hear from Mýa after so many years and without hesitation jumped on board for this special project."

== Track listing ==
All tracks written by Sisqó and Darryl Pearson.

US CD single / maxi-single
No.	Title	Producer(s)	Length
1.	"It's All About Me" (Radio Version)	Darryl "Day" Pearson; Sisqó^{[a]}	4:24
2.	"It's All About Me" (LP Version)	Pearson; Sisqó^{[a]}	4:26

UK 12" single / European CD single / maxi-single
No.	Title	Producer(s)	Length
1.	"It's All About Me" (Radio Version)	Pearson; Sisqó^{[a]}	4:24
2.	"It's All About Me" (New R&B Remix Clean)	Pearson; Sisqó^{[b]}	3:44
3.	"It's All About Me" (Hula Radio Mix)	Pearson; Sisqó^{[a]}; Lamar "Hula" Mahone^{[b]}	5:59

Notes

- ^{^[a]} denotes co-producer(s)
- ^{^[b]} denotes remix producer(s)

Sample credits

- "It's All About Me" contains an interpolation of "Moments in Love" by Art of Noise.

== Credits and personnel ==
Credits adapted from the liner notes of Mya.

=== Recording ===
- Recorded at Silent Sound Studios (Atlanta, Georgia)
- Mixed at Studio 56 (Los Angeles, California)

=== Personnel ===
- Darryl "DAY" Pearson – production, vocal arrangements
- Sisqo – vocal arrangements
- Mike Alvord – recording engineer
- Kevin Lively – recording engineer assistance
- Tom Kidd – mixing

== Charts ==
=== Weekly charts ===
Weekly chart performance for "It's All About Me"
Chart (1998)	Peak position
Canada Dance/Urban (RPM)	19
Netherlands (Dutch Top 40 Tipparade)	18
Netherlands (Single Top 100)	76
New Zealand (Recorded Music NZ)	13
US Billboard Hot 100	6
US Dance Club Songs (Billboard)	29
US Hot R&B/Hip-Hop Songs (Billboard)	2
US Rhythmic Airplay (Billboard)	9

=== Year-end charts ===
Year-end chart performance for "It's All About Me"
Chart (1998)	Position
US Billboard Hot 100	49
US Hot R&B Singles (Billboard)	11

== Certifications ==
Certifications for "It's All About Me"
Region	Certification	Certified units/sales
United States (RIAA)	Gold	800,000

== Release history ==
Release dates and formats for "It's All About Me "
Country	Release date	Format(s)	Label	Ref.
United States	March 10, 1998	CD single	Interscope · Polydor	
United States	March 17, 1998	Urban radio	Interscope · Polydor	
United States	May 12, 1998	CHR/Pop	Interscope · Polydor	
United Kingdom	September 4, 1998	CD Single	Interscope · Polydor	
Germany	September 25, 1998	CD Single	Interscope · Polydor	
United Kingdom	November 2, 1998	Radio	Interscope · Polydor	

== See also ==
- List of Billboard Hot 100 top 10 singles in 1998
