= Love Is the Answer (Cedric Gervais song) =

Single by Mýa and Cedric Gervais

Single by Cedric Gervais starring Mýa

from the album Miamication and K.I.S.S. (Keep It Sexy & Simple)
- Released: February 8, 2011
- Studio: Sleaze Industries Studios (Miami, Florida)
- Genre: House; dance; electropop
- Length: 2:57
- Label: Ultra
- Songwriters: Mýa Harrison, Dee Roberts
- Producers: Cedric Gervais, Sandy Vee

Mýa singles chronology
"Fabulous Life" (2011)	"Love Is the Answer" (2011)	"Runnin' Back" (2011)

"Love Is the Answer" is a song by French DJ and record producer Cedric Gervais starring American singer Mýa. It served as Gervais's first single from his studio album Miamication and theme song for the NOH8 campaign. The track was inspired by humanity and various causes Harrison involves herself in particularly and most recently the NOH8 campaign. Written and composed by Mýa and Dee Roberts with additional production by Sandy Vee, the song made its world premiere at the Renaissance Hollywood Hotel and Spa.

Love Is the Answer was released February 8, 2011 worldwide on iTunes and after a series of delays and conflict over editing with Gervais’ label Ultra records the song's accompanying music video made its debut on Perez Hilton’s blog site. The music video was directed by Washington D.C. native 8112 Studios and it featured Harrison and Gervais in a night club with footage of Harrison performing the song live at numerous night clubs across the nation.

== Background ==
In interview with AOL, Mýa revealed the inspiration behind "Love Is the Answer" saying; So many things inspired it. Humanity, togetherness and the causes I'm involved with like NOH8 campaign. It's all about universal love and acceptance regardless of differences over a hot dance track that gets the party going.

== Release and promotion ==
On Wednesday, February 9, 2011, Renaissance Hotels and their newly launched global entertainment platform, RLife LIVE, hosted a special performance by Mýa and Cedric Gervais for the official worldwide single release of "Love is The Answer" at Renaissance Hollywood Hotel and Spa. Mýa and Cedric Gervais performed "Love Is the Answer" at the 26th annual International Dance Music Awards Thursday, March 10, 2011.

== Critical reception ==
Peace Magazine and MuuMuse gave the song positive reviews. Peace Magazine called "Love Is the Answer" a hands down smash commenting, "it's a club killer that will set the tone and light the dance floor up; it's very Top 40 and rhythmic radio friendly." MuuMuse wrote, "Love Is the Answer" is just in time to join the recent wave of "It Gets Better" pop anthems igniting both the Billboard Hot 100 and the Hot Club/Dance Play charts."

== Music video ==
In search of a production company to shoot her latest music video-a dance-friendly collaboration with superstar DJ Cedric Gervais-she and label Ultra Records quickly zeroed-in on the District's own 8112 Studios. Founded in 2008 by Nicholas Cambata and Douglas Sonders, the 8112 team has quickly become one of the city's most sought after production companies, with a client list that includes Apple, National Geographic, and Universal. "Love Is the Answer", Mýa's latest video follows her and Gervais as they heat things up at a swanky VIP club throughout the night. Naturally, with every club setting comes a matching set of beautiful people. A casting call was conducted by 8112 on Sunday afternoon at The Reserve on L Street. With a bevy of talented women and men in attendance, Nicholas and Douglas meticulously interviewed each candidate, focusing specifically on elements of style and individuality. "Love Is the Answer" was shot on-location in D.C. on December 21 and 22, with post production completed locally by 8112 soon thereafter.

The "Love Is the Answer" music video was directed and produced by 8112 studios in Washington, D.C. (Harrison's hometown). It was the first time Harrison shot a music video in Washington D.C. Mýa said she chose to shoot the video in D.C. because not only to showcase the city, but however be a "creative ambassador for it as well."

After numerous delays and conflicts with Ultra Records over editing, the "Love Is the Answer" music video premiered on May 18, 2011 on Perez Hilton's blog site. The music video featured cameos from the blogger and socialist himself and La Coacha.

== Track listing ==
Remixes EP
No.	Title	Length
1.	"Radio Edit"	2:57
2.	"Love Is the Answer" (Club Mix)	6:02
3.	"Love Is the Answer" (Second Sun Remix)	9:39
4.	"Love Is the Answer" (Mysto & Pizzi Vocal Remix)	6:53
5.	"Love Is the Answer" (Mysto & Pizzi Dub Remix)	7:08
6.	"Love Is the Answer" (DJ Ortzy & Mark M Remix)	7:38
Total length:		38:97

== Personnel ==
- Mýa – vocals
- Cedric Gervais – producer
- Ben Grasinni – mixing
- Sandy Vee – producer

== Release history ==
Region	Date	Format	Label	Ref.
Various	February 8, 2011	Digital download	Ultra	
