= A. Haqq Islam =

American music executive and businessman

A. Haqq Islam is an American music executive and businessman. He is founder and former CEO of University Music Entertainment and University Records, which is home to award-winning, multi-platinum-selling artists, Dru Hill, Sisqo, and Mýa.

== Music career ==
As the company's CEO, Islam negotiated multi-million dollar deals with Fortune 500 companies. He steered the careers of a roster of talent that included artists, producers and songwriters, accounting for over $50 million record sales worldwide, while producing ten number one songs.

Islam began his career learning the fundamentals of R&B music, artist development and the music business in recording studios of New York City. First starting as a show promoter in Washington, DC, Islam subsequently formed his own label – University Records, and landed signings of soon to become platinum artists Dru Hill, Mya and Sisqo.

Through joint venture deals with Interscope and Def Jam, University Records went on to produce ten Number 1 singles and twenty Top Ten singles. University Records artists have been nominated for and have won every major music award, including: The American Music Awards, Billboard Awards, Soul Train Awards and The Grammys.

In 2019, Islam founded CONTRA WORLDWIDE RECORDINGS. CONTRA produced music for a series of films broadcast on the BET network including Tyler Perry's "Sistas" in December 2019 and has been nominated for a 2020 NAACP Award. CONTRA’s first artist is Casey808, a Hip Hop artist out of Hawaii.

Islam has taught Entertainment Business Education at the Duke Ellington School of the Arts in Washington, DC where he created the Business of Music Visiting Lecture Series to train students about the behind-the-scenes aspects of the entertainment business. The lecture series also traveled to several colleges and universities, featured guests included Rockafella Records co-founder Damon Dash, Legendary R&B Group Earth Wind & Fire, R&B artist, Ledesi, Film Producer; Lisa Cortez, Legendary Music Producer Kenny Gamble of Gamble and Huff.

== Other ventures ==
Islam is co-founder and CEO of The Rucker Park Prep summer basketball league for young men 8–16 years of age which take place in the historic Holcomb Rucker Park in Harlem, NY. He is still working in entertainment with current film and television projects in development with his company Jegna Filmworks.

Islam is also a Real Estate Developer with several projects underway in Newark, NJ. As a partner in the Davidson, Abraham & Associates Company (DAA), Islam works as a liaison between city governments to move projects forward.

== Personal life ==
A native of Queens, NY, Islam is a graduate of Howard University with a BA in Political Science and completed coursework at Howard towards a Master’s Degree in International Relations.
