= Welcome to My World (Mya song) =

Single by Mya

from the album Smoove Jones
- Released: October 10, 2015
- Recorded: The HitList Recording Studios
- Genre: R&B
- Length: 4:14
- Label: Planet 9
- Songwriters: Mya Harrison; Damar Beckett; Fred Jenkins; Terence "Delivery Boy" Odige
- Producers: Terence "Delivery Boy" Odige; Dejan Howerton; Michael Williams

Mya singles chronology
"Mr. Incredible" (2012)	"Welcome to My World" (2015)	"Team You" (2015)

"Welcome to My World" is a song recorded by American singer Mya taken from her seventh studio album Smoove Jones (2016). It was written by Damar Beckett, Fred Jenkins, Mýa and Terence "Delivery Boy" Odige, while production was helmed by the latter Terence "Delivery Boy" Odige, Dejan Howerton and Michael Williams. An ode to '90s R&B with live instrumentation, "Welcome to My World" was chosen as the lead single from her then unknown project Smoove Jones and released October 10, 2015 (coincide with Mya's birthday). Upon release, it received favorable reception from music critics, with critics highlighting the track as a standout.

== Background and recording ==
"Welcome to My World" was written by Damar Beckett, Fred Jenkins, Mýa and Terence "Delivery Boy" Odige, with production handled by the latter Terence Odige, Dejan Howerton and Michael Williams. Speaking with SOHH, Mýa explained how the song was created. In 2014, Harrison began working with several people from Los Angeles and was immediately introduced to New Jersey native production duo The HitList. Subsequently, the trio began working on music together and one of the first of many tracks Harrison recorded with them was "Welcome To My World".

== Release ==
In late September 2015, Mýa previewed "Welcome To My World" on her official Instagram account as the first single from then unknown project Smoove Jones. It was officially released on October 10, 2015.

== Critical reception ==
In reviewing Smoove Jones, "Welcome To My World" received "favorable" reviews. Ryan B. Patrick of Exclaim!, highlighted "Welcome To My World" as one of stand out tracks, opining the song "recall late-'90s/early '00s R&B". While, United Kingdom's Gay Times, commented, "Welcome To My World is a shimmery cut that sets up a strong opening section full of potential singles."

== Personnel ==
- Mýa – vocals, songwriting
- Fred Jenkins – songwriting
- Damar Beckett – songwriting
- Terence "Delivery Boy" Odige – songwriting, composer
- Dejan Howerton – composer
- Michael Williams – composer

== Release history ==
Region	Date	Format	Label	Ref.
Various	October 10, 2015	Digital download	Planet 9; Ingrooves	
