= Team You =

Single by Mya

from the album Smoove Jones
- Released: December 8, 2015
- Recorded: The HitList Recording Studios
- Genre: R&B
- Length: 4:13
- Label: Planet 9
- Songwriter(s): Mya Harrison; Damar Beckett; Fred Jenkins
- Producer(s): Terence Odige

Mya singles chronology
"Welcome to My World" (2015)	"Team You" (2015)	"Coolin'" (2017)

"Team You" is a song recorded by American singer Mya taken from her seventh studio album Smoove Jones (2016). It was written by Damar Beckett, Fred Jenkins and Mýa, while production was helmed by Terence Odige. A throwback to '90s R&B "Team You" was chosen as the second single from Smoove Jones and released December 8, 2015. Upon release, it received mixed to favorable reception from music critics, with some highlighting it a standout track while others referred to "Team You" as mildly "cheesy" with redundant chorus.

== Background and recording ==
"Team You" was written by Damar Beckett, Fred Jenkins, and Mýa, while production was handled by Terence Odige. Speaking with SOHH, Mýa explained how the song was created. In 2014, Harrison began working with several people from Los Angeles and was immediately introduced to New Jersey native production duo The HitList. Subsequently, the trio began working on music together and one of the first of many tracks Harrison recorded with them was "Welcome To My World". Harrison credits Fred as the person behind the idea of "Team You", clarifying, "it was The HitList's Fred who actually started that concept of "Team You" and when she heard it she "loved it". Commenting, "It’s so now, it’s very 90's with the music but it has very contemporary lines and has melodies." Upon hearing the track, Mýa promptly added her writing to it and completed the song with him. Thus, that's how "Team You" was born. In retrospect, Mýa acknowledged, "We live in a world where everybody is hard, from girls to guys, and we keep poppin’ that swag out of our mouths." Reminiscing, "It’s very 90’s and you got that from the SWV's where it was OK to voice your affection and your love for somebody. So I wanted to take it back."

== Critical reception ==
In reviewing Smoove Jones, "Team You" received "mixed" to "favorable" reviews. Ryan B. Patrick of Exclaim!, highlighted "Team You" as one of stand out tracks, opining the song "recall late-'90s/early '00s R&B". While, United Kingdom's Gay Times, commented "Team You is well intentioned but has a mildly cheesy and repetitive chorus."

== Personnel ==
- Mýa – vocals, songwriting
- Fred Jenkins – songwriting
- Damar Beckett – songwriting
- Terence Odige – composer

== Release history ==
Region	Date	Format	Label	Ref.
Various	December 8, 2015	Digital download	Planet 9; Ingrooves	
