= Retrospect (Mya album) =

Studio album by Mya
- Released: May 15, 2026
- Length: 61:47
- Label: Planet 9
- Producers: Michael Cox; Lamar Edwards; John Eley; John Groover; Mya Harrison; Mike & Keys; Micah Powell

Mya chronology
T.K.O. (The Knock Out) (2018)	Retrospect (2026)

Singles from Retrospect
- 1. "A.S.A.P." Released: January 30, 2026; 2. "Just a Little Bit" Released: May 1, 2026

Retrospect is the ninth studio album by the American singer Mya. It was released on May 15, 2026, through Planet 9. Her first album in eight years, the singer attributed the gap in between releases to the challenges of being an independent artist.

Solely produced by Mya, her production partner Lamar Edwards, and production duo Mike & Keys with a few additional contributions, Retrospect is inspired by music from the '70s and '80s and pays homage to the era when the singer fell in love with music. An ode to the funk, soul, and R&B music she grew up listening to, it blends "funk-oriented" sounds and "signature harmonies" of that time with "90s ad-libs" and "90s R&B" while incorporating hip-hop and contemporary elements as well.

It was preceded by the album's lead single "A.S.A.P." Commercially, well received by critics and radio, it peaked at number sixteen on the Adult R&B Songs chart. Among the guest appearances featured on the album are rappers 21 Savage, Phile Adé, D-Nice, Joyner Lucas, Snoop Dogg, Too $hort, and Dizzy Wright.

== Background ==
Following the release of her last studio effort T.K.O. (The Knock Out) (2018), Mya ventured back into acting with a foray into reality television. For two seasons, she starred in the Allblk drama 5th Ward The Series (2018–2020). Next, the singer appeared in the reality television show Girls Cruise (2019), alongside Lil Kim and Rozonda "Chilli" Thomas. Mya continued to act and starred in her first Lifetime Christmas movie My Favorite Christmas Melody (2021). In 2023, she returned to the silver screen with a cameo in the rebooted comedy House Party. In the meantime, while in the production process for her next studio effort, she released a slew of singles to hold fans over. Aside from releasing standalone singles throughout the years, the singer celebrated the twenty-fifth anniversary of her second album, Fear of Flying (2000). She commemorated the occasion with a vinyl reissue and a Dolby Atmos streaming release in October 2025.

== Development ==
Mya on the creation of Retrospect (2026)

"This album is a celebration of the kind of funk that never fades. It’s a bridge between the past and the future, honoring the greats, my inspirations, while forging something new.

— Kyle Denis, Billboard

Production on Retrospect took place from 2016 to 2021. Back in 2003, the singer leaned on these musical roots on Moodring (2003) in particular, with her reimagined Rick James "Cold Blooded" cover "Sophisticated Lady" to her hit "My Love Is Like...Wo." However, with Retrospect she took a deeper dive into the kind of records that have always been "part of her." During her time while recording T.K.O. with her production partner MyGuyMars, they began to create blueprints of other projects in mind. By a chance encounter with production duo Mike & Keys working in the same studio, the singer took a track from the duo and penned "Give It to You", a song she first began shaping in early 2017 and one of the first tracks she cut for Retrospect. By mid-2021, in a promotional interview with Rated R&B, she had shared Projects 14 and 15 were on the way, being mixed, and she was in the midst of putting features on one of the albums. In addition, the singer mentioned she was aligning her teams, which included publicity, marketing, radio, and visual teams and focused on getting her film money to invest in it. Lastly, the singer explained early on Retrospect, according to her, was "growth", "evolution", "content", "penmanship", and "timelessness", but it also pays homage as it is all of the music the singer grew up with. Upon completion in 2021, the singer announced Retrospect had been mixed, mastered, and paid for. Years in the making, Mya ascribed the project's delay to "legal processes", "featured artist agreements", "label clearances", and the untimely death of her and her production partner's mixing engineer. Set to be a celebration of all the sounds the singer has loved over the years, Retrospect, in her words, is a blend of the combined eras—late 1970s, early 1980s funk, hip-hop, R&B, and pop—with contemporary sounds. Originally slated for a late 2025 release, after playing the album for Terry Lewis of Jam & Lewis—since she was honoring the pioneers of the funk era—at his and her mixing engineer's suggestions, as well as "to make sure the things that need to be brought up sonically are brought out" before the world hears it, the singer delayed the project once more due to the fact she was still in the process of mixing it in Dolby Atmos. Mya also hinted that several artists have expressed interest in featuring on the record, confirming that at least four or five collaborations are anticipated for the album.

== Production and recording ==
A collaborative effort between the singer and her production partner MyGuyMars, Retrospect is built on "creative intentions" and "celebration" rather than "market-driven formulas". The bulk of Retrospect was recorded in Los Angeles, amassing songs that she tinkered with over the course of several years, while the mixing and mastering components happened when the singer was touring. To give consumers a listening experience, she mixed Retrospect in Sony 360 and spatial audio as well. Recorded between Smoove Jones (2016) and T.K.O. (The Knock Out), as with all of her projects, it encompasses crisp vocals, dancer-level precision, and songwriting that is centered around romance, confidence, and self-respect. Despite the album's retro vibe, there are no samples on the album, a decision and rule the singer complies with at the advice of Prince. According to the singer, every song on Retrospect was initiated from scratch with the exception of one track, which was presented to her. For Retrospect, the singer saw the value in taking her time, in an interview with the Associated Press, she divulged she has "revisited songs," "added features," "remade (songs)," and "taken different approaches for certain tracks" as well with her production partner MyGuyMars. Initially dissatisfied with the final results, she mentioned that the duo has remastered the entire album twice after the remixing process. In response, she stated: "It's about when its right and ready to their ears." Speaking on sequencing the album, she revealed the first half of Retrospect is "upbeat," "joyous," while the latter half of the album is more "introspective." Citing a plethora of artists as her inspiration for the album's influence, namely Teena Marie, Prince, Rick James, Stevie Wonder, the Gap Band, and the S.O.S. Band, the singer adapts a blend of R&B, soul, pop, and funk, musically and sonically. Retrospect derives from the raw, synths-driven pulse of late 1970s and 1980s Minneapolis funk.

== Music and lyrics ==
Musically and lyrically, Retrospect began to formulate during the COVID-19 pandemic, when the singer rediscovered the music of her childhood. Songs by music groups on Soul Train, at the roller rink, and at cookouts: Jimmy Jam and Terry Lewis, the S.O.S. Band, Prince, Vanity 6, Marie, James, Evelyn "Champagne" King, Mary Jane Girls, and Patrice Rushen. Comprising sixteen tracks, Retrospect is a collection of tracks inspired by 1970s and 1980s Minneapolis funk, pop, R&B, and soul.

Retrospect opens with DJ D-Nice introducing the 1980s-themed song "Give It to You," a slick groove dripped in nostalgic synths and a funky bassline. Pulling inspiration from Rick James, the singer borrows James' inflections on the word "elated." A dance-ready track, the singer can't help but express her devotion to a potential love interest. It is followed by the pulsating Paisley Park-inspired "Masterpiece." Speaking with Vibe, she referred to "Masterpiece" as "flirtatious," "fun," and "musical." The album's third track, "No Pressure", a backyard barbecue jam with a funky bassline where Mya channels late singer Marie. Featuring Snoop Dogg, the rapper provides a laid-back delivery that fits naturally into the groove without disturbing the feel of the record. Built on shimmering synthesizer, "Just a Little Bit," is a flirtatious, synth-heavy rhythm that finds the singer at her most confident and self-assured. Featuring Too $hort, the rapper's contribution adds an authoritative West Coast funk presence opposite Mya's playful, groove-forward delivery. Next up, "Saturday Night," a funky, '80s-inspired track centered on the anticipation of the weekend and the promise of a good night to look forward to. It built around synthesizers and heavy drums with a contemporary twist.

The Rufus and Chaka Khan-coded "Ain't Another" serves as the album's seventh track. Centered on themes of open communication and honesty in a relationship, "A.S.A.P." and its remix serve as the album's lead single. Infused with subtle nods to the sounds of the 1980s, "A.S.A.P." is a "sultry," "atmospheric," mid-tempo groove. The track finds the singer crooning about a love worth fighting for. In contrast, the remix introduces a fresh perspective, transforming the track into a dynamic, layered exchange between voices. 21 Savage delivers a focused, hard-hitting verse that adds "urgency" and "perspective". Following this, the album's ninth track, the defiant anthem, "Games With My Love", features Dizzy Wright. A smooth, bass-rich production, the DMV remix of "Face to Face" is a "vibrational", "spiritual", self-reflective track blending timeless R&B tones with contemporary embodiment textures. Deemed the singer's "spiritual flex" song, it features DMV native artist Phil Adé adding a sharp lyrical edge that connects back to the singer's hometown roots.

Influenced by Michael Jackson, the clattering synth "Life is What You Makes It" serves as the album's eleventh track. Speaking on the concept behind the record, the singer shared, "It's a timeless message and a reminder to press pause and not miss out on the little things or the time that we don’t have here." Track twelve, "Anytime," is an "airy," "bright," "sultry" and "beautifully layered" production that glides effortlessly as Mya floats across it with confidence and ease. Rolling Out cites the track as the album's highlight and opined, "It is sexy without trying too hard and nostalgic without sounding dated." Inspired by a true event, the final track, a "big ballad" titled "Just Call My Name," is a "mellow" and "enchanting" song about finding solace in a dependable partner that will never leave your side. The singer assures her companion that she is a comforting presence, a shoulder to cry on, reminding him that he doesn’t have to face challenges alone. It pulls influence from the singer's mentor Prince with its "Purple Rain"-style guitars.

== Marketing ==
=== Title ===
Writing for Rolling Out magazine, photojournalist Nagashia Jackson perceived the album's title as an "artistic statement". She opined its title suggests "a meditative examination of the singer's musical legacy while simultaneously pointing toward new creative directions." Acknowledging the eight-year gap between the singer's major releases, she reflected on the subject commenting, "This extended development period indicates a deliberate approach to album construction, allowing for thoughtful curation and sonic experimentation." With the inclusion of 21 Savage and Joyner Lucas on the album, the journalist took notice of the "cross-generational appeal" that "demonstrates her continued relevance within hip-hop's contemporary landscape."

=== Distribution ===
Normally, the singer releases her projects on a "boutique level". However, seeking alternatives to traditional industry structures, for Retrospect Mya opted for a partnership with Virgin Music Group, marking a strategic alignment that allows the singer to maintain "creative control" while accessing "broader distribution infrastructure". On May 4, 2026, via her Instagram account, the singer revealed the cover for Retrospect and made pre-orders available ahead of its May 15, 2026, release date.

=== Promotion ===
To kick off the album's campaign, in May 2025, the singer released standalone "Face to Face" where she visited Good Morning Washington and Fox 5 Washington to discuss and promote the single. In June 2025, she performed at 25th BET Awards in tribute to 106 & Park. In July 2025, the singer previewed new music and offered a first look at her new projects at the Urban 1 summit. In August 2025, she was featured and interviewed for UK publication Principle magazine. In August 2025 as well, she guest co-hosted Fox 5 New York's Good Night New York where she previewed a glimpse of her music video for "Face to Face". In September 2025, she graced the cover of Hype Hair magazine and attended the third annual Caribbean Music Awards where she was a presenter and first teased the new album Retrospect with Billboard. In October 2025, she graced the cover of Scorpio Jin magazine and performed at the Las Vegas Aces championship celebration parade. On February 2, 2026, she made an appearance on Sherri, where she announced the album and an accompanying tour. That same month, the singer sat down with Complex News in a promotional interview where she discussed the upcoming album, advice Prince gave her on going independent, and twenty-fifth anniversary of "Lady Marmalade". On February 18, 2026, LA Travel magazine hosted a private rooftop celebration at the W Hollywood hotel where the magazine unveiled the singer as their Winter issue cover and previewed new music as well at the event.

In March 2026, Mya performed at the Essence's Black Women In Hollywood luncheon. She performed her single "Unbreakable". That same month, Mya was announced as a supporting act for the Pussycat Dolls' PCD Forever Tour for the North America concerts. However, the North America trek of the tour was canceled, attributing it to ticket sales. Pressing onward, the singer eyes a fall tour for "Retrospect," which had always been part of the game plan. A standalone concert was announced in early June at Mohegan Sun Arena. On May 4, 2026, the singer held a mini listening party.

=== Singles ===
"A.S.A.P." was released as Retrospect's lead single on January 30, 2026. Described as a sultry, 1980s-"informed" and "tinged" mid-tempo groove centered around the themes of open communication and honesty. Commercially, ahead of its official launch, "A.S.A.P." became one the most added songs at R&B radio. It debuted at number twenty-two on Adult R&B Songs chart, marking the singer's first entry on that chart. An accompanying music video for "A.S.A.P." was released on February 14, 2026, directed by City James. A remix featuring 21 Savage was released February 27, 2026. "Just a Little Bit" featuring Too Short was released as the album's second single on May 1, 2026.

== Critical reception ==
Professional ratings
Review scores
Source	Rating
Eulalie	4.6/5 stars
Maxazine	(7/10)
Renowned for Sound	Positive
Rolling Out	4/5 stars
Shatter the Standards	4/5 stars

Upon its release, Retrospect received critical acclaim. Shatter the Standards awarded Retrospect four out of five stars, writing, "Mya spent a decade building a funk album that sounds like 1985 and talks like tonight – The old-school production is meticulous, the lyrics never look backward, and the tension is the whole argument." Similarly, Rolling Out's Eddy Lamarre gave the album four out five stars as well. He commended the singer for not "chasing trends or trying to force herself into today's sonic landscape." Weighing in on the album's body of work and the singer's vocal performance, he praised Retrospect for "never feeling like cosplay or imitation," as well as revered the singer for "sounding completely comfortable throughout the project." Opining, "She never over sings on this album. She never sounds like she is forcing notes or trying to prove vocal ability. Instead, she leans into tone, feeling and atmosphere." He concluded his review of the album on this sentiment, sharing "Retrospect is a strong addition to Mya's catalog and proof that there is still space for soulful, feel-good R&B that honors the past while moving forward creatively." Renowned for Sound rewarded the album a positive review as well and noted Retrospect "holds a steady, cohesive groove from start to finish," though every track leans into the same retro foundation, "the record offers pleasant, natural variation in tone." Citing "Good to You" in particular as the album’s definitive track, the magazine opined it "distils everything that makes Retrospect distinctive." Renowned for Sound ended their review on this note, commenting, "Retrospect thrives in quiet, everyday moments-whether laid-back gatherings, slow evening drives or peaceful solo downtime — it is a polished, endlessly replayable release that reveals more charm with every listen." Billboard's Kyle Denis hailed Retrospect "a bold new chapter and a welcome return for one of R&B's most buttery, singular voices."

=== Listicles ===
Listicles
Publication	List	Rank	Ref.
Shatter the Standards	The 50 Best R&B Albums of 2026 So Far	—N/a	
Soul In Stereo	The Best Albums of 2026... So Far	—N/a	

== Track listing ==
Retrospect track listing
No.	Title	Writer(s)	Producer(s)	Length
1.	"Give It to You" (featuring D-Nice)	Mya Harrison; Lamar Edwards; Michael Cox; John Groover	Harrison; Edwards; Cox; Groover	3:48
2.	"Masterpiece"	Harrison; Edwards; Kevin Kesse	Harrison; Edwards	2:59
3.	"No Pressure" (featuring Snoop Dogg)	Harrison; Edwards; Vincent Berry II; Calvin Broadus	Harrison; Edwards	3:18
4.	"Just a Little Bit" (featuring Too Short)	Harrison; Edwards; Dominique Logan; Darius Logan; Todd Shaw	Harrison; Edwards	3:57
5.	"Good to You"	Edwards; Davion Farris; Harrison; Mayila Jones	Edwards	4:00
6.	"Saturday Night"	Edwards; Micah Powell; Harrison; John Eley	Edwards; Powell; Harrison; Eley	3:42
7.	"Ain't Another" (with Joyner Lucas)	Edwards; Cox; Groover; Harrison; Gary Lucas; Kyle Williams; Farris	Edward; Cox; Groover; Harrison	4:22
8.	"A.S.A.P." (remix) (featuring 21 Savage)	Harrison; Shéyaa Bin Abraham-Joseph; Berry II; Edwards	Harrison; Edwards	3:41
9.	"Games with My Love" (featuring Dizzy Wright)	Edwards; Harrison; La'Reonte Wright; Cox; Groover; Farris	Edwards; Harrison; Cox; Groover	3:51
10.	"Face to Face" (DMV remix) (featuring Phil Adé)	Edwards; Cox; Groover; Harrison; Paige Wheatland; Philip Adetumbi	Edwards; Cox; Groover; Harrison	4:37
11.	"Life Is What You Make It"	Edwards; Cox; Farris; Groover; Harrison; Berry II	Edwards; Cox; Groover; Harrison	3:39
12.	"Anytime"	Harrison; Edwards; Cox; Groover; Gabrielle Nowee; Brooklyn Dior Sarden	Edwards; Mike & Keys; Harrison^{[v]}	4:54
13.	"Just Call My Name"	Nowee; Harrison; Edwards	Harrison; Edwards	4:56
14.	"A.S.A.P."	Harrison; Abraham-Joseph; Berry II; Edwards	Harrison; Edwards	2:48
15.	"Face to Face"	Edwards; Cox; Groover; Harrison; Wheatland; Adetumbi	Edwards; Cox; Groover; Harrison	3:54
16.	"Just a Little Bit" (solo mix)	Harrison; Edwards; Dominique Logan; Darius Logan; Shaw	Harrison; Edwards	3:21
Total length:				61:47

=== Notes ===
- ^{^[v]} denotes a vocal producer.

== Personnel ==
The credits are adapted from Tidal.

=== Musicians ===
- Mya Harrison – lead vocals (all tracks)
- D-Nice – featured vocals (track 1)
- Kevin Kross – background vocals (track 2)
- Joe Cleve – bass guitar (track 2)
- Lamar Edwards – electric guitar (track 2)
- Snoop Dogg – featured vocals (track 3)
- Too Short – featured vocals (track 4)
- Joyner Lucas – featured vocals (track 7)
- 21 Savage – featured vocals (track 8)
- Dizzy Wright – featured vocals (track 9)
- Phil Adé – featured vocals (track 10)
- Gabrielle Nowee – background vocals (track 13)
- Matt Spatola – electric guitar (track 13)

=== Technical ===
- Mya Harrison – recording (all tracks)
- Dennis Jones – mastering (all tracks)
- Reggie Rojo – mastering (tracks 1–2, 4–12); mixing (tracks 1–2, 4–12)
- Andrew Benavidez – mixing (track 3)
- Derek Anderson – recording (track 8)
- Cristal Viramontes – recording (track 9)

== Release history ==
Release history
Date	Format(s)	Label	Ref.
May 15, 2026	Music download; music streaming	Planet 9	
