= Whine (song) =

Single by Mya featuring Bounty Killer
- Released: August 18, 2023
- Recorded: 2019–2021
- Studio: Tuff Gong International (Kingston, Jamaica)
- Length: 3:30
- Label: Planet 9; Ingrooves
- Songwriters: Mavelle Gilbert; Mya Harrison; Rodney Price; Theron Thomas; Matthew Thompson
- Producer: Philip "DJ Hardwerk" Constable

Mýa singles chronology
"Worth It" (2021)	"Whine" (2023)	"Face to Face" (2025)

Music video
- "Whine" on YouTube

"Whine" is a song recorded by American singer Mya featuring Bounty Killer. The track was written by Mavelle Gilbert, Theron Thomas, Matthew Thompson, Rodney Price, and Mya with production helmed by Philip "DJ Hardwerk" Constable. A standalone single, "Whine" – celebrates the singer's landmark 25 years in the music industry – was released August 18, 2023 on her label imprint Planet 9 with distribution via Ingrooves. Preceding the single's release, an accompanying music video followed.

== Background ==
In celebration of her landmark 25 years in the music industry, Mya collaborated with her former record label Interscope/UMe to honor and release exclusive editions of her catalog. The commemoration included a digital deluxe twenty-fifth anniversary edition of her debut album, a digital deluxe twentieth anniversary edition of her third studio album, Moodring (2003), and a remixed and reimagined audio and heel choreography music video of her debut single "It's All About Me" (1998) with Brian Friedman. Following those releases, she gifted fans with a new single titled, "Whine" featuring Bounty Killer.

== Composition ==
"Whine" initially began as a solo endeavor in 2019 and recorded at Tuff Gong International studio in Kingston, Jamaica. After listening back to the track unsatisfied with the results, the singer realized the song needed to be kicked up a notch. In 2021, after the pandemic, she reached out to Bounty Killer via his DMs and emailed him the track. Upon listening to the song, he loved it and agreed to record a verse. The finalized version of "Whine" features a guest verse from Bounty Killer.

"Whine" is a flirty, party-ready sexy, dancehall pop groove written by Mavelle Gilbert, Theron Thomas, Rodney Price, and Mya with a common runtime of three minutes and thirty seconds. Additionally, Bounty Killer and Mya provided background vocals as well, while engineer Ivan Krasnodar was responsible for mixing duties on the track. The track itself, produced by DJ Hardwerk echoed the nostalgia of the singer's classic collaboration "Girls Dem Sugar" (2000) with Beenie Man, capturing the contemporary fusion of today's dancehall and pop music. Of their collaboration, Mya shared with excitement, "Such a treat & good vibes, getting to work with another Dancehall legend who blessed this record with so much energy! Big up to The General!"

== Release and promotion ==
Originally, "Whine" was scheduled to be release in 2019 during the singer's stint on Vh1's reality show Girls Cruise, however the single's release was postponed. In the meantime, she opted to release a slew of other standalone singles in its place such as "You Got Me, Part II," "Space and Time," (2020) and "Worth It" (2021). Following a milestone in her career and after the release of several anniversary exclusives of her discography, she gifted fans with new single "Whine" featuring Bounty Killer. "Whine" was released August 18, 2023 on digital and streaming platforms. A day prior to its release, she discussed "Whine" with Estelle on The Estelle Show on Apple Music. On the single's release date, at 1 p.m. EST, Mya went live Talkin' Bout Whine on TikTok to celebrate the release of "Whine" with her fans. On October 10, 2023, the singer released an extended play of "Whine" dance mixes.

== Music video ==
=== Background ===
The music video for "Whine" was directed by frequent collaborator Josh Sikkema and the singer's dancer Derek Brown, produced by Mya and filmed in Kingston, Jamaica. Initially, the singer had a solo version of the video shot two years prior to reaching out to Bounty Killer. After recording "Whine" now with Bounty Killer featured, Mya suggested, "We have to shoot a video." A music video was commissioned, the singer and her team went back down to Jamaica two years later and the pair went back to the same exact location [as the first video] and inserted Bounty Killer in the video. Additionally, the singer ordered a wig to match her other hair because it was a different color at the time. Due to other committed obligations, she finished the video up two years later.

=== Synopsis ===
A vibrant music video, "Whine," showcases the colorful landscapes of Kingston, Jamaica and opens to Mya sporting long curly red hair, an aqua-colored midriff, and yellow lambada skirt with her girls sitting outside bored to death until she presses play on a boombox cassette deck and the track fills the air. Next, the singer elegantly adapts to the tropical temperatures in a tasteful country home. As the video continues, Mya traipse through her bungalow and whine up, whine down and whine it to the ground. The home which features colonial-style architecture serves as the perfect backdrop. Wandering aimlessly through different parts of the two-story home, she occasionally syncs with local dancers for tantalizing dance choreography. By the end of the video, she meets her friends back outside, and they turn the courtyard into a dancehall as more people join their revelry.

=== Dance version ===
On October 10, 2023, Mya released a dance version music video of "Whine." Directed solely by back up dancer Derek Brown, the singer is joined by Dance Jamaica dancehall queens Latonya Style, Sara Bendii, Kissy McKoy and Shanice Caterpillar to give viewers some lessons and eye candy. Filmed on location at Wickie Wackie Beach, Mya and company bust a sexy move against a picture-perfect background of waves and blue skies. During the clip the ladies showcase traditional dancehall-style dances for beginner, intermediate and advanced levels allowing people to get in where they fit in and follow along.

== Track listing ==
Digital download/streaming

1. "Whine" – 3:30

== Credits and personnel ==
Credits lifted from the liner notes of "Whine."

=== Recording ===
- Recorded at Tuff Gong International (Kingston, Jamaica)

=== Personnel ===
- Philip "DJ Hardwerk" Constable – production
- Duwayne "DaDa" Mills – artist and repertoire
- Ivan Krasnodar – mixing
- Mavelle Gilbert – songwriting
- Theron Thomas – songwriting
- Matthew Thompson – songwriting
- Mya Harrison – songwriting, background vocals
- Rodney Price – songwriting, background vocals

== Release history ==
Release dates and formats for "Whine"
Region	Date	Format	Label	Ref.
Various	August 18, 2023	Digital download; streaming	Planet 9; Ingrooves	
Various	October 10, 2023	Digital download; streaming	Planet 9; Ingrooves	
