= Earthquake (Mya song) =

Single by Mýa featuring Trina

from the album K.I.S.S. (Keep It Sexy & Simple)
- Released: December 6, 2011
- Studio: Da Cave (Cleveland, Ohio); 4 Star Recording Studios (Miami, Florida)
- Genre: R&B; Hip hop
- Length: 3:19
- Label: Planet 9; Ingrooves
- Songwriters: Kris Day; Lindsay "Lindz" Fields; Kevon Ford; Cristo Jeanette; Nia Myricks; Katrina Taylor
- Producers: Young Yonny; Desmond J. "Good Guy Dez" Peterson

Mya singles chronology
"Runnin' Back" (2011)	"Earthquake" (2011)	"Somebody Come Get This Bitch" (2011)

Trina singles chronology
"Long Heels Red Bottoms" (2011)	"Earthquake" (2011)	"I'm Back (Back 2 Business)" (2012)

"Earthquake" is an R&B/hip hop song by American singer Mya. It served as Harrison's first U.S. digital single from her sixth studio album K.I.S.S. (Keep It Sexy & Simple) (2011) and featured Miami rapper Trina. The song was originally due to be featured on the Japanese version of K.I.S.S., however the song was pulled out of respect to the victims affected by the earthquake in Japan. The song was written by The Pen Up Dolls (Lindsay "Lindz" Fields, Cristo Jeanette, and Nia Myricks) and produced by Young Yonny and @goodguydez.

"Earthquake" was released to iTunes on December 6, 2011. It is Harrison's first single to be released in the United States four years after her studio album Liberation (2007).

== Background ==
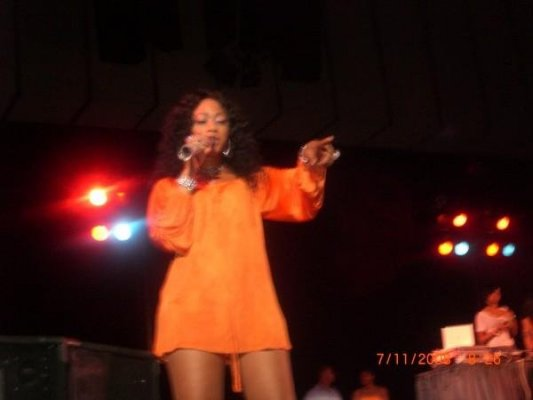
Trina made a featured guest appearance and lent her voice to the track.

Before being released in the United States, "Earthquake" was originally featured on the Japanese version of K.I.S.S. but removed of respect after the devastating earthquake. "When considering to release it on the U.S. version this fall, again it was a decision I went back and forth on, but ultimately, I think people will understand my decision to release the song, because at the end of the day I think the world is ready to have some fun, and take negative situations and reinvent them into something positive, that we can own, learn from and that bring us together," Mýa told AOL Music of the timing of the song's release. "Sometimes we just need to let loose, let our hair down, come together and shake it like an Earthquake!" the singer added.

Mýa continued, "'Earthquake' is just a really fun song that crowds go wild for when I perform it live and tested it in the clubs.

In an interview with Billboard.com's The Juice, Harrison explained how the collaboration came about with Trina:

Trina and I [initially] worked together for her mixtape, Diamonds Are Forever, and collaborated on a song for her album called 'Can I', and we did a trade-off situation, being that we're both independent," Mýa says. "And I thought she was real appropriate for the record because she comes with that swag."

== Credits and personnel ==
Credits adapted from the liner notes of K.I.S.S. (Keep It Sexy & Simple).

Recording

- Recorded at Da Cave Studios (Cleveland, Ohio) and 4 Star Recording Studios (Miami, Florida)
- Mixed at iLab Studios (Los Angeles, California)

Personnel

- Mýa – vocals
- Bishop – mixing
- Yasiel "Edge" Landrian – engineering
- Desmond J. Peterson – production
- Young Yonny – engineering, production

== Release history ==
Release history and formats for "Earthquake"
Region	Date	Format	Label	Ref.
United States	December 6, 2011	Digital download	Planet 9	
Canada	December 6, 2011	Digital download	Planet 9	
