= Fifth Wall Records =

American record label

- Founded: 2013
- Distributor(s): Kudos Records, INgrooves
- Genre: Techno, house music
- Country of origin: United States
- Location: Brooklyn, New York
- Official website: www.fifthwallrecords.com

Fifth Wall Records is an American independent record label based in Brooklyn, New York. Founded in 2013 by producers Divvorce and Hound Scales, Fifth Wall releases primarily house music and techno. In December 2013, electronic music magazine Resident Advisor named Fifth Wall its "Label of the Month". As of January 2015, Fifth Wall had released fifteen vinyl 12" records and one charity compilation. Its name is a reference to the fourth wall in theater and other artistic media.

== Discography ==
=== 12" Records ===
- Hound Scales - Case (Nabis) EP [5WALL001]
- Divvorce - Used Experience EP [5WALL002]
- Clouds - Man Out of Dubs EP [5WALL003]
- Myler - Fatland EP [5WALL004]
- MATRiXXMAN - The XX Files EP [5WALL005]
- Unklone - Designated #41 EP [5WALL006]
- Hound Scales - Femen EP [5WALL007]
- Physical Therapy - Yes, I'm Elastic EP [5WALL008]
- Divvorce - Vanessa (A Dreamer) EP [5WALL009]
- Metrist - Doorman in Formant EP [5WALL010]
- Handsome Head - Teenaged Nezha EP [5WALL011]
- Alis - Apache EP [5WALL012]
- Various Artists - The Giant Monarch EP [5WALL013]
- Hound Scales - Pinky Violence EP [5WALL014]
- Dualit - Bumper Crop EP [5WALL015]

=== Charity compilations ===
- Various Artists - No Person Is an Island [5WALLCHARITY]
