= List of awards and nominations received by Mya =

Mya awards and nominations
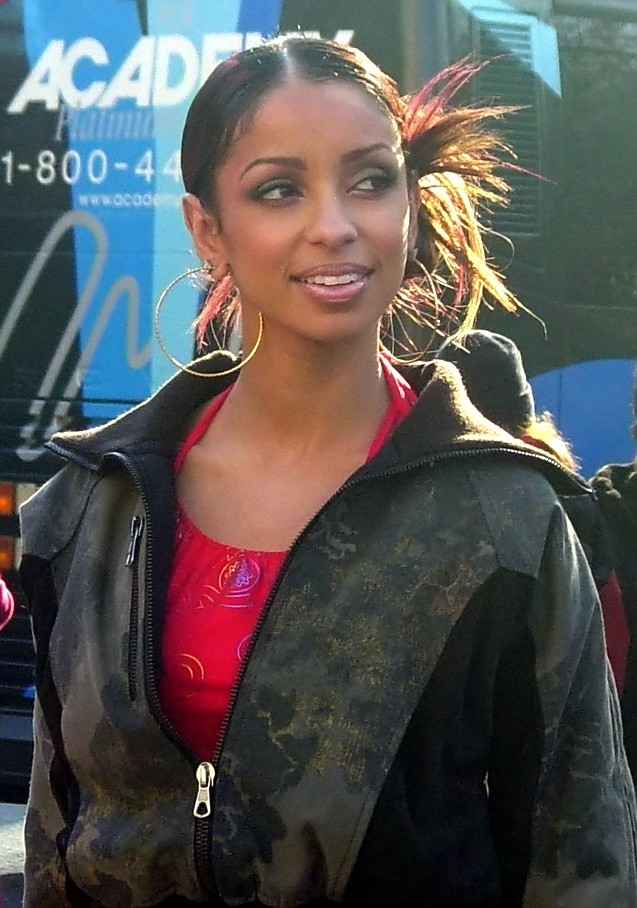
- Mýa at the 2003 Macy's Thanksgiving Day Parade
Awards and nominations
| Award | Wins | Nominations |
| Billboard | 0 | 1 |
| Grammy | 1 | 3 |
| MOBO | 1 | 2 |
| MTV VMA | 2 | 10 |
| Soul Train | 0 | 3 |
| Teen Choice | 1 | 1 |
| WAMA | 8 | 16 |

Totals (Note: Certain award groups do not simply award one winner. They acknowledge several different recipients, have runners-up, and have third place. Since this is a specific recognition and is different from losing an award, runner-up mentions are considered wins in this award tally. For simplification and to avoid errors, each award in this list has been presumed to have had a prior nomination.)
- Wins: 38
- Nominations: 58

American R&B-pop singer and actress Mya Harrison released her self-titled debut album in 1998 under Interscope Records. It spawned the singles "It's All About Me", "Movin' On", and "My First Night with You". The album and its success helped her score Soul Train Music Award nominations for Best R&B/Soul or Rap New Artist and Best R&B/Soul Album – Female, an NAACP Image Award nomination for Outstanding New Artist, and a Billboard Music Award nomination for New R&B/Hip-Hop Artist of the Year. Her guest featured vocals on "Ghetto Supastar (That Is What You Are)" led to her first Grammy nomination for Best Rap Performance by a Duo or Group.

In 2000, Mya released her second studio album Fear of Flying. The album spawned the single "Case of the Ex" and scored two nominations: Soul Train Music Award for Best R&B/Soul Album, Female and Music of Black Origin Award for Best Album. In 2001, alongside Christina Aguilera, P!nk, and Lil’ Kim, she covered "Lady Marmalade". Their rendition was a global hit and spent five weeks atop the Billboard Hot 100. Its success led to accolades in 2001 and 2002, including a Grammy Award for Best Pop Collaboration with Vocals. Harrison's participation in the musical Chicago earned her a Screen Actors Guild Award and Critics' Choice Movie Award for Best Acting Ensemble.

Harrison released her third studio album Moodring in 2003. It earned her two MTV Video Music Award nominations for Best Dance Video and Best Choreography. At the 2005 MTV Movie Awards, Harrison scored a nomination for Best Frightened Performance, for her role of Jenny Tate in the horror film Cursed. She was honored in 2006 at the Palm Beach International Film Festival, receiving the Cross Over Award (from singer to actor). Her eighth independent project Smoove Jones received a Grammy nomination for Best R&B Album at the 59th Annual Grammy Awards. She has won over 27 awards from 68 nominations.

== ACCA Awards ==
| Year | Nominated work | Category | Result | Ref. |
|---|---|---|---|---|
| 2002 | Chicago | Best Cast Ensemble | Runner Up | |

== ALMA Awards ==
| Year | Nominated work | Category | Result | Ref. |
|---|---|---|---|---|
| 2002 | "Lady Marmalade" | Outstanding Song in a Motion Picture Soundtrack | Won | |
| 2002 | 43rd Grammy Awards | Performance in a Music, Variety or Comedy Special | Nominated | |

== Billboard Music Video Awards ==
| Year | Nominated work | Category | Result | Ref. |
|---|---|---|---|---|
| 1998 | "It's All About Me" | Best New R&B/Urban Clip | Nominated | |
| 2001 | "Lady Marmalade" | Best Dance Clip of the Year | Nominated | |

== Billboard Year-End List ==
| Year | Nominee / work | Award | Result |
|---|---|---|---|
| 1998 | Mya | Top New Pop Artists | 8th Place |
| 1998 | Mya | Top New R&B Artists | 4th Place |
| 1998 | Mya | Top R&B Artists – Female | 5th Place |
| 2000 | Mya | Top R&B/Hip Hop Artists – Female | 10th Place |

== Broadcast Film Critics Association Award ==
Founded in 1995, the BFCA presents its Critics' Choice Awards each year to honor the finest achievements in film making. Mýa has won one award.

| Year | Nominated work | Category | Result | Ref. |
|---|---|---|---|---|
| 2003 | Chicago | Best Acting Ensemble | Won | |

== Celebrity Catwalk ==
| Year | Recipient | Category | Result | Ref. |
|---|---|---|---|---|
| 2009 | Mya | Animal Activism | Honoree | |

Note: Mya was an honoree at the 2009 Celebrity Catwalk for her contribution in helping the plight of innocent animals.

== Channel V Thailand Music Video Awards ==
| Year | Nominated work | Category | Result | Ref. |
|---|---|---|---|---|
| 2002 | "Lady Marmalade" | Popular Duo/Group Video | Won | |

== CosmoGIRL! of the Year Awards ==
| Year | Nominated work | Category | Result | Ref. |
|---|---|---|---|---|
| 2003 | Herself | CosmoGIRL! of the Year | Nominated | |

== G-Phoria ==
| Year | Nominated work | Category | Result | Ref. |
|---|---|---|---|---|
| 2004 | James Bond 007: Everything or Nothing | Best Voice Performance – Female | Nominated | |

== Gold Derby Awards ==
| Year | Nominated work | Category | Result | Ref. |
|---|---|---|---|---|
| 2002 | Chicago | Ensemble Cast | Nominated | |

== Grammy Awards ==
The Grammy Awards are awarded annually by the National Academy of Recording Arts and Sciences. Mya has won one award from three nominations.

| Year | Nominated work / Recipient | Category | Result | Ref. |
|---|---|---|---|---|
| 1999 | "Ghetto Supastar" | Best Rap Performance by a Duo or Group | Nominated | |
| 2002 | "Lady Marmalade" | Best Pop Collaboration with Vocals | Won | |
| 2017 | Smoove Jones | Best R&B Album | Nominated | |

== Juice TV Awards ==
| Year | Nominated work / Recipient | Category | Result | Ref. |
|---|---|---|---|---|
| 2001 | "Lady Marmalade" | Best R&B Video | Won | |

== MOBO ==
The MOBO Awards (an acronym for Music of Black Origin) were established in 1996 by Kanya King. They are held annually in the United Kingdom to recognize artists of any race or nationality performing music of black origin. Mya has won one award from two nominations.

| Year | Nominated work | Category | Result | Ref. |
|---|---|---|---|---|
| 1998 | "Ghetto Supastar" | Best International Single | Won | |
| 2001 | Fear of Flying | Best Album | Nominated | |

== MTV Movie Awards ==
| Year | Nominated work | Category | Result | Ref. |
|---|---|---|---|---|
| 2005 | Cursed | Best Frightened Performance | Nominated | |

== MTV Video Music Awards ==
The MTV Video Music Awards were established in 1984 by MTV to celebrate the top music videos of the year. Mýa has won two awards from ten nominations.

| Year | Nominated work | Category | Result | Ref. |
|---|---|---|---|---|
| 1998 | "Ghetto Supastar" | Best Rap Video | Nominated | |
| 1998 | "Ghetto Supastar" | Best Video from a Film | Nominated | |
| 2001 | "Lady Marmalade" | Video of the Year | Won | |
| 2001 | "Lady Marmalade" | Best Video from a Film | Won | |
| 2001 | "Lady Marmalade" | Best Dance Video | Nominated | |
| 2001 | "Lady Marmalade" | Best Pop Video | Nominated | |
| 2001 | "Lady Marmalade" | Best Choreography | Nominated | |
| 2001 | "Lady Marmalade" | Best Art Direction | Nominated | |
| 2003 | "My Love Is Like...Wo" | Best Dance Video | Nominated | |
| 2003 | "My Love Is Like...Wo" | Best Choreography | Nominated | |

== MTV Asia Awards ==
| Year | Nominated work | Category | Result | Ref. |
|---|---|---|---|---|
| 2002 | "Lady Marmalade" | Favorite Video | Nominated | |

== MTV Europe Music Awards ==
The MTV Europe Music Awards were established in 1994 by MTV Europe to celebrate the most popular music videos in Europe.

| Year | Nominated work | Category | Result | Ref. |
|---|---|---|---|---|
| 2001 | "Lady Marmalade" | Best Song | Nominated | |

== MTV Video Music Awards Japan ==
| Year | Nominated work / Recipient | Category | Result | Ref. |
|---|---|---|---|---|
| 2002 | "Lady Marmalade" | Best Video from a Film | Won | |

== The Music Factory Awards ==
=== Belgium ===
| Year | Nominated work | Category | Result | Ref. |
|---|---|---|---|---|
| 2001 | "Lady Marmalade" | International Video of the Year | Won | |

=== Netherlands ===
| Year | Nominated work | Category | Result | Ref. |
|---|---|---|---|---|
| 2002 | "Lady Marmalade" | International Video of the Year | Won | |

== My VH1 Music Awards ==
| Year | Nominated work | Category | Result | Ref. |
|---|---|---|---|---|
| 2001 | "Lady Marmalade" | Is It Hot in Here Or Is It Just My Video | Won | |
| 2001 | "Lady Marmalade" | My Favorite Video | Won | |
| 2001 | "Lady Marmalade" | There's No "I" In Team (Best Collaboration) | Nominated | |

== National Film & Television Awards ==
| Year | Recipient | Category | Result | Ref. |
|---|---|---|---|---|
| 2019 | Girls Cruise | Best Reality Show | Nominated | |
| 2019 | Girls Cruise | Best Entertainment Show | Won | |

== National Museum of African American Music ==
| Year | Recipient | Category | Result | Ref. |
|---|---|---|---|---|
| 2026 | Mya | Soul of the 90s | Honoree | |

Note: Mya was honored as NMAAM's Soundtrack Marshal recognizing her contribution to the soundtrack of contemporary R&B.

== NAACP Image Awards ==
| Year | Recipient | Category | Result | Ref. |
|---|---|---|---|---|
| 1999 | Mya | Outstanding New Artist | Nominated | |

== Nielsen Broadcast Data System Awards ==
Nielsen Broadcast Data Systems, better known as BDS, is a service that tracks monitored radio, television and internet airplay of songs based on the number of spins and detections.

| Year | Recipient | Category | Result | Ref. |
|---|---|---|---|---|
| 2003 | "Case of the Ex" | 300,000 Spins | Won | |
| 2003 | "My Love Is Like...Wo" | 50,000 Spins | Won | |
| 2004 | "Ghetto Supastar (That Is What You Are)" | 200,000 Spins | Won | |
| 2005 | "Fallen" | 50,000 Spins | Won | |
| 2006 | "Lady Marmalade" | 300,000 Spins | Won | |

== NRJ Radio Awards ==
| Year | Recipient | Category | Result | Ref. |
|---|---|---|---|---|
| 2001 | "Lady Marmalade" | Best International Song | Nominated | |
| 2001 | "Lady Marmalade" | Best Song from Soundtrack | Nominated | |

== Online Film Critics Society Awards ==
| Year | Nominated work | Category | Result | Ref. |
|---|---|---|---|---|
| 2002 | Chicago | Best Ensemble | Nominated | |

== Online Film & Television Association ==
| Year | Nominated work | Category | Result | Ref. |
|---|---|---|---|---|
| 2001 | "Lady Marmalade" | Best Music, Adapted Song | Nominated | |
| 2002 | "Cell Block Tango" | Best Music, Adapted Song | Won | |
| 2002 | Chicago | Best Ensemble | Won | |

== Palm Beach International Film Festival ==
| Year | Recipient | Category | Result | Ref. |
|---|---|---|---|---|
| 2006 | Mya | Cross Over Award (from singer to actor) | Honoree | |

Note: Mya was honored with the Cross Over Award at the 2006 Palm Beach International Film Festival.

== Phoenix Film Critics Society Awards ==
| Year | Recipient | Category | Result | Ref. |
|---|---|---|---|---|
| 2003 | Chicago | Best Acting Ensemble | Nominated | |

== Radio Music Awards ==
| Year | Nominated work | Category | Result | Ref. |
|---|---|---|---|---|
| 2001 | "Lady Marmalade" | Song of the Year – Top 40 | Won | |

== The Record of the Year ==
| Year | Nominated work | Category | Result | Ref. |
|---|---|---|---|---|
| 2001 | "Lady Marmalade" | Record of the Year | Nominated | |

== Screen Actors Guild Awards ==
The Screen Actors Guild Awards were first presented in 1995. The awards recognize performances in film and television, including individual acting performances and ensemble casts in drama and comedy series and motion pictures. The ceremony presents thirteen acting awards and has been broadcast live on TNT and TBS. Mya has won one award.

| Year | Nominated work | Category | Result | Ref. |
|---|---|---|---|---|
| 2003 | Chicago | Outstanding Performance by a Cast in a Motion Picture | Won | |

== Soul Train Lady of Soul Awards ==
| Year | Nominated work / Recipient | Category | Result | Ref. |
|---|---|---|---|---|
| 1998 | Mya | Best R&B/Soul or Rap New Artist | Nominated | |
| 1999 | "Movin' On" | Best R&B/Soul Song of the Year | Nominated | |

== Soul Train Music Awards ==
The Soul Train Music Awards is an annual award show aired in national broadcast syndication that honors the best in African American music and entertainment established in 1987.

| Year | Nominated work | Category | Result | Ref. |
|---|---|---|---|---|
| 1999 | Mya | Best R&B/Soul or Rap New Artist | Nominated | |
| 1999 | Mya | Best R&B/Soul Album – Female | Nominated | |
| 2001 | Fear of Flying | Best R&B/Soul Album – Female | Nominated | |

== Source Hip-Hop Music Awards ==
| Year | Nominated work | Category | Result | Ref. |
|---|---|---|---|---|
| 1999 | Herself | R&B Artist of the Year | Nominated | |

== South Africa Walk of Fame ==
| Year | Nominee / work | Award | Result | Ref. |
|---|---|---|---|---|
| 2026 | Herself | Recording Artist | Honored | |

Note: Mya was honored with a star at the 2026 Ndlala Mall Walk of Fame.

== Stinkers Bad Movie Awards ==
| Year | Nominated work | Category | Result | Ref. |
|---|---|---|---|---|
| 2001 | "Lady Marmalade" | Worst Song in a Film or Its End Credits | Nominated | |

== TEC Awards ==
| Year | Nominated work | Category | Result | Ref. |
|---|---|---|---|---|
| 2002 | "Lady Marmalade" | Record Production – Single or Track | Nominated | |

== Teen Choice Awards ==
The Teen Choice Awards is an awards show presented annually by the Fox Broadcasting Company. The program honors the year's biggest achievements in music, movies, sports, television, fashion and more, as voted on by teens aged 13–19. Mya has won one award from two nominations.

| Year | Nominated work | Category | Result | Ref. |
|---|---|---|---|---|
| 2001 | "Lady Marmalade" | Choice Song of the Summer | Won | |
| 2001 | "Lady Marmalade" | Choice Music: Dance Track | Nominated | |

== Titan Arts Awards ==
| Year | Nominated work | Category | Result | Ref. |
|---|---|---|---|---|
| 2017 | Herself | Icon of the Year | Honoree | |

== Washington Area Music Awards ==
The Washington Area Music Association recognize significant career achievements by area musicians. Nominations and balloting come from the WAMA membership. Mya has won eight awards from twenty-eight nominations.

| Year | Nominated work / Recipient | Category | Result | Ref. |
|---|---|---|---|---|
| 1998 | Mya | Urban Contemporary – Vocalist | Won | |
| 1998 | Mya | Artist of the Year | Nominated | |
| 1998 | Mya | New Artist | Won | |
| 1998 | Mya | Album of the Year | Nominated | |
| 1998 | Mya | Debut Recording | Won | |
| 1998 | Mya | Rap/Hip Hop – Female Vocalist | Nominated | |
| 1998 | "It's All About Me" | Song of the Year | Nominated | |
| 1998 | "It's All About Me" | Video of the Year | Nominated | |
| 1999 | Mya | Urban Contemporary – Female Vocalist | Won | |
| 1999 | Mya | Artist of the Year | Nominated | |
| 1999 | "My First Night with You" | Song of the Year | Nominated | |
| 1999 | "My First Night with You" | Video of the Year | Nominated | |
| 2000 | Mya | Urban Contemporary – Female Vocalist | Won | |
| 2000 | Mya | Artist of the Year | Nominated | |
| 2000 | Mya | Spotlight Award | Honoree | |
| 2000 | Fear of Flying | Urban Contemporary Recording | Won | |
| 2000 | Fear of Flying | Album of the Year | Nominated | |
| 2001 | Mya | Urban Contemporary – Female Vocalist | Nominated | |
| 2001 | Mya | Artist of the Year | Nominated | |
| 2001 | "Case of the Ex" | Urban Contemporary Recording | Won | |
| 2001 | "Case of the Ex" | Video of the Year | Nominated | |
| 2002 | Mya | Urban Contemporary – Vocalist | Nominated | |
| 2003 | Mya | Urban Contemporary – Vocalist | Nominated | |
| 2003 | Moodring | Urban Contemporary Recording | Nominated | |
| 2004 | Mya | Artist of the Year | Nominated | |
| 2019 | Mya | Best R&B Artist/Group | Nominated | |
| 2020 | Mya | Best R&B Artist/Group | Won | |
| 2021 | Mya | Best R&B Artist/Group | Nominated | |

Note: Mya was honored with the Spotlight Award at the 2000 Washington Area Music Awards. The award is presented to an artist whose success has drawn attention to the Washington area.

== Young Hollywood Hall of Fame ==
| Year | Nominated work / Recipient | Category | Result | Ref. |
|---|---|---|---|---|
| 2000 | Herself | Music Artist | Inducted | |

== ZAZ Awards (South Africa) ==
| Year | Nominated work / Recipient | Category | Result | Ref. |
|---|---|---|---|---|
| 2001 | "Lady Marmalade" | International Song of the Year | Nominated | |
