= Smoove Jones =

Studio album by Mya
- Released: February 14, 2016
- Recorded: 2013–2015
- Genres: R&B; soul; hip-hop
- Length: 45:36
- Label: Planet 9
- Producers: Yonni; The Hit List; Delivery Boy; Terrell Sass; T-Town Productions; Desmond "BigHeadDez" Peterson; Philip "HardWork" Constable; Lamar "Mars" Edwards

Mya chronology
Love Elevation Suite (2015)	Smoove Jones (2016)	T.K.O. (The Knock Out) (2018)

Singles from Smoove Jones
- 1. "Welcome to My World" Released: October 10, 2015; 2. "Team You" Released: December 8, 2015

Smoove Jones is the seventh studio album by American singer Mya. It was released exclusively through Apple Music and iTunes on February 14, 2016 by Planet 9, Harrison's label, while physical copies were made available for purchase through the singer's official website. The project commemorates the release of the singer's debut single "It's All About Me" and eighteenth anniversary in the entertainment industry. Musically, Smoove Jones incorporated R&B/soul/hip-hop with old school elements from the 1970s, 1980s, and 1990s. Dubbed a concept album, the project exhibited Harrison portraying seductive radio hostess Smoove Jones, an after hours radio show she created specifically for her "grown and sexy" fans. Critically, Smoove Jones received favorable reception from music critics. It debuted at number thirty on the Top R&B/Hip Hop Albums chart, marking her highest entry since 2003's Moodring. Subsequently, Smoove Jones received a nomination for Best R&B Album at the 59th Annual Grammy Awards, which were held on February 12, 2017.

== Background and development ==
I stay in the studio, literally, sometimes I'm there for days straight just creating. That's something I try to do as a songwriter and producer. This project is material that's been collected over the last three years of recording.

— Mya on the creation of Smoove Jones with SOHH.

Almost nearly five years passed between Harrison's last full-length studio album to Smoove Jones. As she did before on her previous project K.I.S.S. (Keep It Sexy & Simple), Harrison served as executive producer for Smoove Jones which entailed her scouting for producers, songwriters, arranging the album's track listing, and keeping track of the accounting. With her sixth studio album K.I.S.S., Harrison catered to Japan's J-pop sound and popular culture. Originally, her seventh studio project was to feature her EP's Love Elevation Suite (2015) and Sweet XVI (2014) along with bonus tracks manufactured as a CD. However, nothing ever materialized and Harrison scrapped that idea in favor of a new project. Initially, when Harrison started recording material she didn't have a title. She was just in a place of wanting to write from her soul. In an interview with Billboard on the project's creation, Harrison clarified, "I didn't necessarily say, "OK, it's time to create a project called Smoove Jones." During the interview, Harrison went further into details and remarked,"I stay in the studio on the regular. I literally live in the studio." Acknowledging, for her, these days are about playing around in the studio and experimenting which is kind of how the project happened. Smoove Jones came to her as a concept and while she been giving grown and sexy EPs for the last four EPs, she admits the title was birthed through a picture from a photo shoot she did in 2015 and the vibe of it. The project's overall theme was inspired by the 1970s. Speaking with SOHH on its origin, Harrison explained:

I love the '70s, I love black power, black love as well as temptress vibes and the coolness of how people relayed messages of love. The Isley Brothers were triple OGs to me and you see their influence in R. Kelly. Isaac Hayes, Curtis Mayfield, there was a lot happening socially but as far as love, that was a time of real love to me and because my fans had requested real R&B, real songs, and positivity because when they turn on the radio they're not getting that these days, here you go. I'm only giving what my fans have requested of me and that's kind of how Smoove Jones was birthed and delivered from me.

Approaching, Smoove Jones, Harrison incorporated R&B/soul/hip-hop with old school elements from the 1970s, 1980s, and 1990s because she knew how she wanted it to feel. She wanted it to feel grown and sexy for her fans that have grown up with her for the last 18 years [who] have kids, gotten married and all that. Chatting with KMW exclusive, Harrison said for this album most of the music was already created. Harrison said she chose tracks based on the "R&B/Soul" genre feeling accordingly, because that's what her fans had requested from her. Essentially, Harrison just pulled a collection of songs out of her archive that she thought would vibe well together since everything was recorded within one to three years ago. To avoid early leakage of the project or any of her music, Harrison drafted and services a pre- and post-recording agreement to hold the producers, writers, artists, and engineers liable for leakage, sharing, placement, and playing of her music.

== Title and artwork ==
Speaking on its title with KMW exclusive, Mya said, "I chose Smoove Jones as the title because it best described the laid back, smooth essence and approach to this project." Her friend and fellow artist Cliff Lewis also gave her the nickname "Smoove Jones" in the studio. In an interview with The Frisky, Harrison elaborated more on the title and commented, "I was given the nickname "Smoove Jones" based on my laid back, ol' school vibe and smooth personality." Going further into detail Harrison stated, "since I been giving a lot of grown and sexy music lately, with a '70s vibes, I thought it'd be the perfect name for a project." Harrison depicts Smoove Jones, as a female version of Billy Dee Williams meets Supafly meets Pam Grier.

The album's artwork is from a collection of images of the times Harrison and her photographers got together and "played". Mya explained, "I play a lot and I have friends who are photographers in different states and if I see a fly object after a show, "I say, "Hey, I'll sit in this chair. Take a picture!" In exchange, those images sometimes become artwork for flyers, singles and/or album covers. The project's calendar was shot by her friend and a new photographer she worked with in Arizona. Speaking on behalf of her 2016-2017 zodiac calendar, Harrison commented, "I've known that I've wanted to put a calendar out with an album, but those images are from two years ago and maybe two of them are recent. They've been sitting like a lot of my music and I'm always creating." In between time, it's just something to put out, before her masterpiece whether it's calendars, DVDs, or EPs, etc.

== Composition ==
=== Music and songs ===
Smoove Jones is a departure from Harrison's last studio project K.I.S.S. (Keep It Sexy & Simple), which leaned more toward the dance and pop genre. With this project, Harrison blended the R&B/soul/hip-hop genre with elements of 1970s, 1980s, and 1990s with a modern twist. Theme wise, Smoove Jones focused on empowerment, sensuality, and celebratory records with substance. Naturally, Harrison drew inspiration from within herself, her personal and professional life and during her interview with The Frisky Harrison dispensed where the inspiration stemmed from for particular songs. On records like "Hold On", Harrison called on real life experiences; such as a student that wants to drop out of school to sell dope instead, someone dealing with bullying that wants to take their own life, strippers she has talked to that almost didn't make it out of an abusive relationship because they were afraid to leave, even herself, and those trying times she faced and could've chosen the other side. Songs like "Phya", she reimagined being in her living room with her parents playing Isaac Hayes and Earth, Wind & Fire vinyl records and dancing in her mom's high heels. On "One Man Woman", Harrison traveled back in time and reminisced being in her bedroom in high school listening to Mint Condition on her hot pink boom box. On the outro, she went to her fans and all of their messages regarding their favorite slow jams and mashed them up together as a grown and sexy gumbo.

== Release and promotion ==
The release date for a new project was first reported in January 2015. In a correspondence with a member of Mya's team, Juicy's THE SCOOP disclose Harrison's next project was intended to be a joint venture with a major label so she can acquire support of radio. During that time, no release date was set as of yet, but 2015 was the projection. However, in December 2015, Harrison announced on her Instagram account that her eighth independent project Smoove Jones was available for pre-order exclusively on her official website set to be released (2/14/2016) Valentine's Day worldwide. Through her online music shop, Harrison offer fans the option of purchasing her new project in; standard, autographed, or personalized edition. To further promote her new project, Harrison offer fans the option of purchasing a 17-month zodiac calendar (2016-2017) as an early Christmas gift as well with or without the purchase of the new project. Ticket merchant AXS announced Harrison would embark on a nationwide tour in support of her new album Smoove Jones beginning March 12. On March 12, 2016, Mya held an album release party at Hard Rock Cafe in Dallas, Texas. At the event, Harrison performed new music from Smoove Jones as well as her classic hits. Additionally, fans were given the opportunity to meet Mya and purchase Smoove Jones and/or the 17 month zodiac calendar. Tickets were sold through Eventbrite.

A year later, as a gift to her fans and to commemorate her nineteenth anniversary, Harrison released a music video for the fan favorite "Coolin'". Filmed in Sydney, Australia, director Matt Sharp captures the singer's unmistakable beauty while she lets her vocals do the rest on a sandy beach.

=== Singles ===
On October 10, 2015, Harrison released the first single from the project, titled "Welcome To My World" on all digital formats. The second single, "Team You" was released December 8, 2015.

== Critical reception ==
Professional ratings
Review scores
Source	Rating
Exclaim!	6/10 stars
Gay Times	4/5 stars
HipHopDX	3.7/5

Smoove Jones received generally favorable reviews from music critics. Exclaim! editor Ryan B. Patrick gave the album a 6 out of 10 rating. He felt that "the Washington, D.C. native is too well known for Smoove Jones to be termed a comeback album, yet not well known enough for this album to make a lasting impact", and added that "at 12 tracks, the independent release is solidly produced, and tracks like "Welcome to My World," "Team You" and "Elevator" recall late-1990s/early-2000s (decade) R&B, but numbers like "Hold On" and "Phya" feel regressive and carry little weight." Staff writer Jacqueline Borwick of The Ithacan gave the album 3 out of 5 stars and concluded, "Smoove Jones" is an expression of the singer's passion for music through her lyrics. It is evident that this project was a labor of love for Mya as it was independently made and self-funded, which demonstrates her profound effort and commitment to this craft.

United Kingdom magazine Gay Times rated Smoove Jones four out of five stars, commenting; "At 45 minutes long, Smoove Jones is just the right length to underline its concept without over stuffing it with endless interludes or forgettable ballads." Similarly, online website HipHopDX expressed the exact sentiments and wrote, "After listening to Smoove Jones, it's easily understood that Mya has been in the R&B game a long time. Her near 20-year career has given her enough life experience to put together an album that sounds as cohesive as it does varied. Although this album may not see any action on the charts, it does prove that Mya's talent level is among the elite." Desire Thompson, writing for Vibe magazine, included the album in her "13 Slept on Albums of 2016"–listing and wrote: "The singer keeps it real throughout the album striking with an angelic voice the aspects of womanhood [...] Her switch from benevolent pop to dominating soul proves her staying power isn’t in a Top 40 hit, but in a theme all women can reach. No wonder she scored a Grammy nod."

=== Accolade ===
Year	Ceremony	Award	Result	Ref.
2017	59th Annual Grammy Awards	Best R&B Album	Nominated	

== Commercial performance ==
Smoove Jones debuted at number 30 on Billboard's Top R&B/Hip-Hop Albums chart. It notched her highest-peaking entry on the Top R&B/Hip-Hop Albums chart since 2003's Moodring. On Billboard's component charts, the album debuted at number 15 on the R&B Albums and number 17 on the Independent Albums chart on March 5, 2016.

== Track listing ==
Smoove Jones track listing
No.	Title	Writer(s)	Producer(s)	Length
1.	"Smoove Jones Radio (Intro)"	Mya Harrison	Lamar "Mars" Edwards; Mike & Keys	0:59
2.	"Welcome to My World"	Harrison; Damar Beckett; Fred "DJ" Jenkins; Terence Odige	Terence "Delivery Boy" Odige; Michael Williams; DeJon Howerton	4:10
3.	"Hold On" (featuring Phil Adé)	Harrison; Kalenna Harper; Phil Adé	Philip "HardWork" Constable	3:22
4.	"Elevator" (featuring Smoove Jones)	Harrison; Shaunice "Sha Sha" Jones; Cliff Lewis	Yonni; Desmond "BigHeadDez" Peterson	2:57
5.	"Phya"	Harrison; James "J-Doe" Smith	Yonni; BigHeadDez	3:18
6.	"Spoil Me"	Harrison; Lewis; Jones	Yonni	2:13
7.	"Team You"	Harrison; Jenkins; Damar Aaron Beckett	Delivery Boy	4:12
8.	"Coolin'"	Harrison; Nikki Flores	Dennis-Manuel Peters; Daniel Coriglie; Mario Bakovic	4:01
9.	"One Man Woman (Ol' Skoo' Joint)"	Harrison; Lewis; Lisa Dogonyaro	Terrell Sass; Yonni; Chaz Jackson; Orlando Williamson	4:45
10.	"Circle of Life (Ol' Skoo' Joint)"	Harrison; Jenkins; Beckett	Delivery Boy	4:12
11.	"Smoove Jones Afta Glow Show (Outro)"	Harrison; Terry Lewis; Christopher "C-Mo" Moore; Teron Beal	Mars	6:42

Bonus track
No.	Title	Writer(s)	Producer(s)	Length
12.	"One Man Woman (Unplugged)"	Harrison; Lewis; Dogonyaro	Sass; Yonni; Williamson	4:45

== Personnel ==
Visuals and imagery

- Art direction and design – Daveed Benito, Carlos Perales, Theresa Harrison
- Clothing design – Scot Louie
- Hair stylist – Gerardo "G Tha Hair Stylist" Bracamonte, Eric Jimenez
- Make-up – Laverno Castillo, Amanda Borboa
- Photography – Reesee of Zigga Zagga, Daveed Benito
- Stylist – Scot Louie

Instruments

- Drums – Terrell Sass
- Guitars – Tae G., Mark Strowbridge, Phillip Muckle
- Keyboard – Khyrie Tyler, Terrell Sass
- B-3 organ – David Farmer
- Strings – Mya

Technical and production

- Executive producer – Mya Harrison
- Engineering – Mya Harrison, Joe Domovitch, Rome Palermo, Derek Anderson, Brandon Bishop, 808, Tom Kahre
- Mastering – Rome Palermo
- Mixing – Rome Palermo, Brandon Bishop, Derek Anderson

== Charts ==
Chart performance
Chart (2016)	Peak position
US Independent Albums (Billboard)	17
US Top R&B/Hip-Hop Albums (Billboard)	30

== Release history ==
List of release dates, showing region, formats, label, editions and reference
Region	Date	Format(s)	Label	Ref.
Various	February 14, 2016	CD; digital download	Planet 9; INgrooves	
