= K.I.S.S. (Keep It Sexy & Simple) =

Studio album by Mya
- Released: April 13, 2011
- Genres: Pop; electropop; R&B
- Length: 55:37
- Labels: Manhattan; Planet 9
- Producers: Michael Barney; Aaron Bennett; PJ Bianco; BigHeadDez; Carvin & Ivan; Fredro; Hardwork; Chuck Harmony; Loren Hill; John Ho; Daisuke Imai; Lil' Eddie; Bei Maejor; Duwayne Mills; Jeff Miyahara; Rich Shelton; Young Yonni

Mya chronology
Beauty & the Streets Vol. 1 (2009)	K.I.S.S. (Keep It Sexy & Simple) (2011)	With Love (2014)

Singles from K.I.S.S. (Keep It Sexy & Simple)
- 1. "Fabulous Life" Released: January 19, 2011; 2. "Runnin' Back" Released: February 17, 2011; 3. "Earthquake" Released: December 6, 2011; 4. "Somebody Come Get This Bitch" Released: December 13, 2011; 5. "Mr. Incredible" Released: December 16, 2011; 6. "Mess Up My Hair" Released: February 7, 2012; 7. "Evolve" Released: April 17, 2012

K.I.S.S. (an abbreviation of Keep It Sexy & Simple) is the sixth studio album by American recording artist Mya. First released in Japan on April 20, 2011, it is her second studio album to be produced through Japanese record company Manhattan Recordings and her own label Planet 9. Although the record is a traditional R&B and pop album, Mya incorporated elements of multiple different genres after travelling to Jamaica as well as collaborating with Japanese musicians.

Production on K.I.S.S. was primarily handled by Cleveland native producer Young Yonny with additional contributions from Japanese musicians Jeff Miyahara and Daisuke Imai, Chuck Harmony and longtime collaborators Carvin & Ivan. As with her previous independent projects, Mya took full creative control of the album and lent a hand in the songwriting process, co-writing several of the album's tracks with many different artists and songwriters. In addition, she served as executive producer to the project. Guest features included Miami rapper Trina, international recording artist Iyaz, reggae star Sean Paul and former Immature frontman Marques Houston.

Upon its release, K.I.S.S. debuted at number sixty-one on Billboard's Japan Albums Chart on May 2, 2011, with first week sales of 1,543 copies, and at number seventy-four on the US Top R&B/Hip-Hop Albums chart, ending Mya's nine-year absence from the chart. K.I.S.S. spawned seven singles; two international singles, "Fabulous Life" and "Runnin' Back" featuring recording artist Iyaz, and five US–released singles: "Earthquake", "Somebody Come Get This Bitch", "Mr. Incredible", "Mess Up My Hair", and "Evolve".

== Background and development ==
In 2009, Mya released her first mixtape, Beauty & the Streets Vol. 1 on Planet 9 through J. Prince's Young Empire Music Group, and competed in the ninth season of American dance competition television series Dancing with the Stars. While participating on show, Mya began recording the album that would eventually become K.I.S.S. As with her previous album, she served as executive producer for K.I.S.S which entailed her scouting the producers, songwriters, arranging the album track listing, and keeping track of the accounting. While Sugar & Spice had been catered to Japan's distinct sound and market, Mya approached K.I.S.S. with the aim to record a "classic Mya album", balancing mid-tempos, up-tempos, slow jams and production, with "lots of substance to be discovered lyrically, without getting bored or depressed." Elaborating on the creative process in an interview with 4Eight Media, she commented that it "was a combination of including songs that I had in my archive for years in addition to travelling across the US and Jamaica to work with different producers and artists." The entire album, finished between October 2010 and February 2011, took her about five months to assemble and complete.

== Conception and production ==
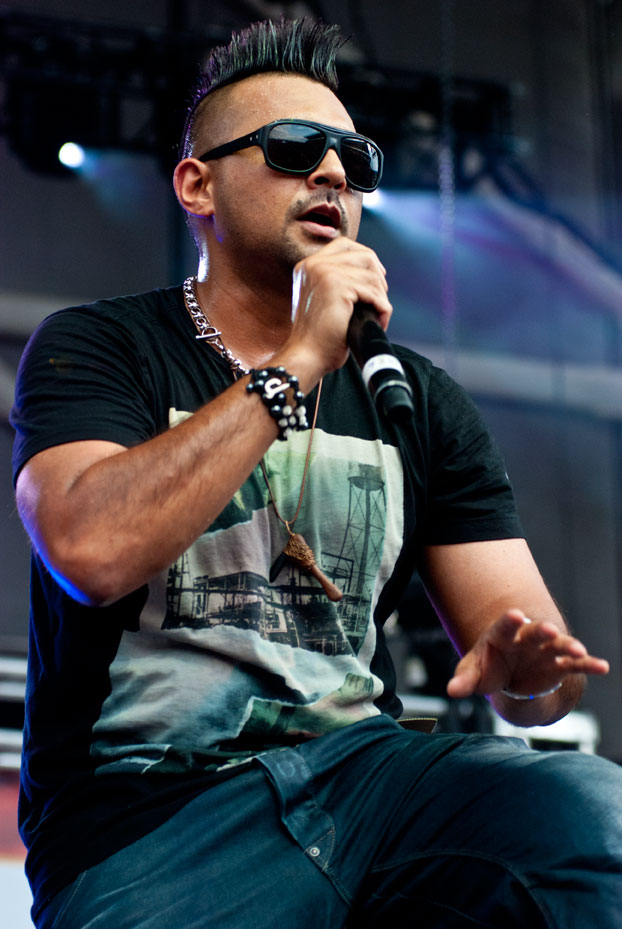
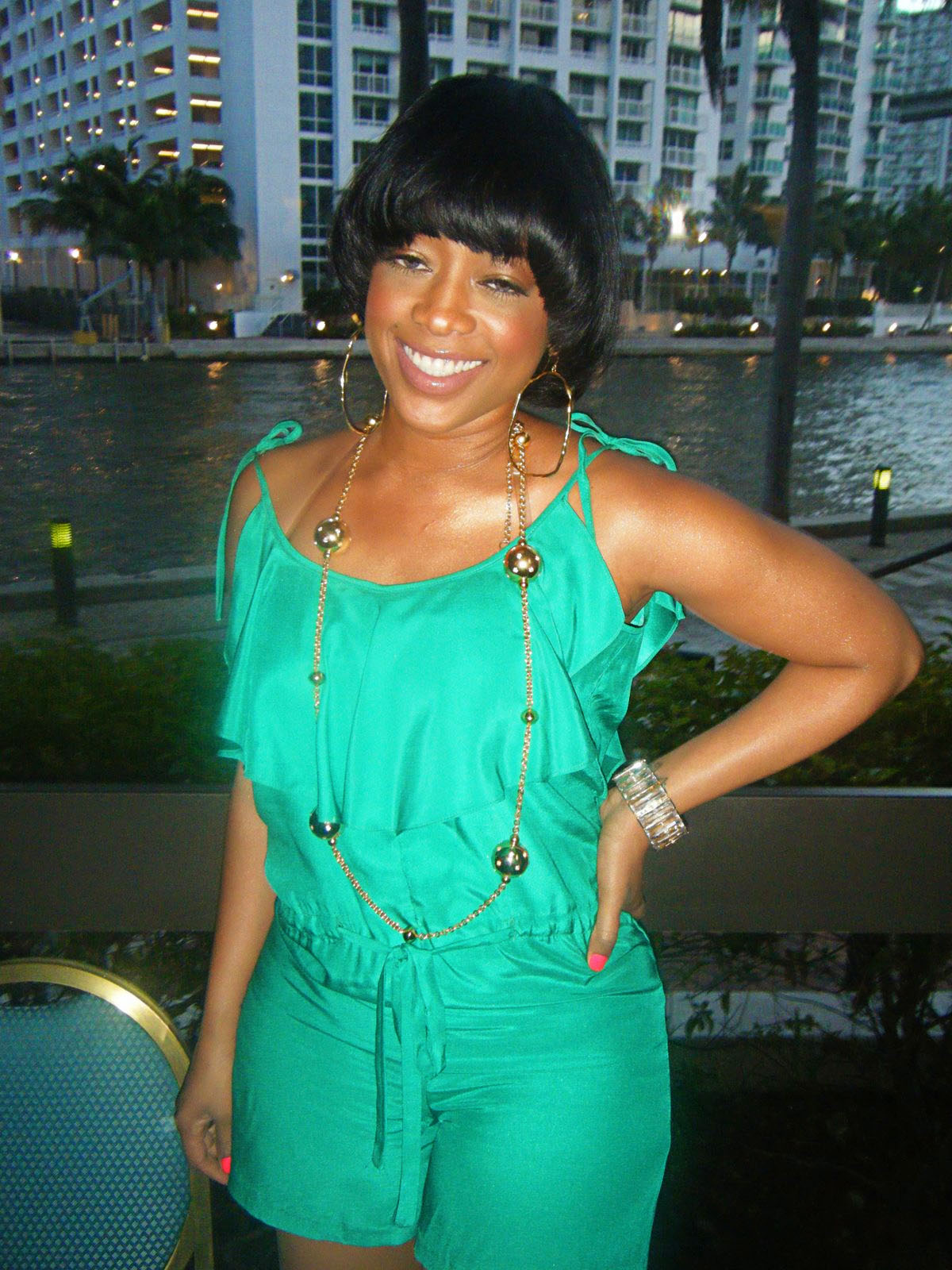
Mya reteamed with Sean Paul (left) on "Rear View Mirror" while Trina (right) collaborated with the singer on the song "Earthquake".

Primary production on K.I.S.S. was handled by hip-hop producer Young Yonny with whom Mya had worked on her previous album Sugar & Spice (2008). Additional contribution came from frequent collaborators Chuck Harmony, Carvin & Ivan, Rich Shelton, and Loren Hill, as well as Lee Major, Junior Sanchez, Lil' Eddie, Autumn Rowe, and Boyz II Men member Shawn Stockman. Japanese musicians who Mya consulted included Tokyo-based Jeff Miyahara and Daisuke Imai. Jamaican rapper Sean Paul, American singer Marques Houston, Virgin Islander singer Iyaz appeared on the original edition of the album, while Jamaican artists Spice and Beenie Man and American rapper Trina were included on subsequent editions of K.I.S.S.

Harrison, who recorded many of the songs during her stint on the ninth season of Dancing with the Stars, combined all different styles on the album. Incorporating a number of music genres, including dance, urban, pop, slow jam ballads, the singer described the album as a "classic Mya album" with a variety of sounds and tempos. When asked if she experimented with anything new on the album as far as sounds, she replied there are two J-pop-inspired songs on the album, "Fabulous Life" and "Alive". She further commented, "This is a new fun sound for me [...] and I'm ready to have some FUN!"

The overall concept of K.I.S.S. was simplicity. "It's about being cool and drama-free. And everything I do reflects that," Mya commented in a promotional interview. "The people that I associate with, the circle that I keep is real simple and sometimes we think or we're trained to believe that you always have to have more, more, more to make ourselves feel happy or beautiful, but it's the other way around for me." Mya noted that the deluxe edition was more of her traditional style, mixing "R&B, urban [and] also pop. It's fun, young with perspective and opinion," she said, with ballads like "Love Comes Love Goes" tackling "deeper issues". Harrison singled out "Evolve", a "heartfelt, mid-tempo" song as one of her favorites, commenting: "[It's] about having determination and will power through it all [...] and not letting anything stop you. It represents where I am in my life." Mya said the album's title track "K.I.S.S." is beneficial because it clarify the meaning of the album. "Love Me Some You" features Houston who Mya requested to record the song with her because she liked the tone of his voice; Harrison said the song was perfect for him. "Problem + Solution" was written by Afro-pop artist Tiwa Savage and Stockman. "Runnin' Back" was conceived as a flavored beat number with sweet mellow vocals. Another track, titled "Before U Say Goodbye" was described as "super catchy" with a "feeling of floating".

== Release and promotion ==
The album cover of K.I.S.S. was shot by photographer Marc Baptiste and was primarily inspired by Janet Jackson's cover for 1986 album Control along with a few other artists, including Vanity 6, The Jets, Andy Warhol, and Lisa, Lisa. All singles cover artwork was shot by Reesee at Zigga Zagga studio. In an interview with AOL, Mya revealed that the meaning behind the abbreviation of K.I.S.S. stands for "Keep It Sexy and Simple." She further explained that she named her album K.I.S.S. because it is "sealed with a kiss as a gift to my fans. It's about keeping it simple by keeping negative energy and unnecessary things to a minimum. Being simple is sexy to me."

Originally scheduled for a physical release in Japan on April 6, 2011, the album's release was delayed for two weeks due to the unfortunate events surrounding the 2011 Tōhoku earthquake and tsunami disaster, which triggered the Fukushima I nuclear accidents, and temporarily immobilized packaging of the CD album. Despite these circumstances, K.I.S.S. eventually became available at retail and outlets on April 20, 2011, serving as Harrison's third independently released project through her own label imprint Planet 9.

On July 22, 2011, Mya put on a special extended performance and held a listening party for the US release of K.I.S.S. in Atlantic City at the Chelsea Hotel's C5 Night Club. The North American deluxe edition of K.I.S.S. was released by Planet 9 on December 20, 2011, on software-based online digital media store iTunes. When the North American deluxe edition of K.I.S.S. was released, Mya opted not shoot any videos or do extensive promotion for the album. Commenting on this strategy, she explained that K.I.S.S. "is just a boutique album that I'm offering fans under the radar. If they want it, it's accessible now. This is just more of an appetizer. I've already started on what people will be looking forward to."

On February 1, 2012, Harrison announced in a press release that she would be releasing the worldwide edition of K.I.S.S. on February 14, 2012, to commemorate her debut single "It's All About Me" and fourteenth year in the music industry through her own label imprint Planet 9 with distribution from INgrooves, a veteran player in the digital music distribution and marketing space.

== Critical reception ==
Professional ratings
Review scores
Source	Rating
About.com	2/5 stars
The Weekender	3.5/5 stars

K.I.S.S. received generally mixed reviews from critics. About.com editor Mark Edward Nero gave the album two out of five stars and declared it as "mediocre, unoriginal and creatively lacking material." He felt that "Mya tries out different personas like she's putting on new sets of clothes: she's a confident, independent woman on the title track; she's a sassy street chick on the club banger 'Earthquake'; she's a vulnerable, heartbroken girl on 'Love Comes, Love Goes'; and she's a strong, powerful woman on 'Evolve'," concluding that "she doesn't come off convincingly in any of the roles. And the lack of consistency and cohesiveness throughout the album ultimately proves to be the second-biggest drawback, right after the multiple weak vocal performances."

Staff writer Stephanie DeBalko of The Weekender gave the album three and a half stars out of five. She called K.I.S.S. "an unexpectedly vibrant, peppy outing", expressing that it "shows Mya still [has] a few tricks up her sleeve," while commenting the album's production and lyrical content, writing: "A lot of the songs have an '80s flavor to them, with jingly effects and forthright lyrics."

== Commercial performance ==
Upon its original April 2011 release, K.I.S.S. debuted at number sixty-one on the Japanese Top Billboard Albums Chart and at number seventy-two on Japan's Oricon Albums Chart with first-week sales of 1,543. In its second week, K.I.S.S. dropped to number 97 on the Oricon Albums Chart and number 77 on Japan's Top Billboard Albums Chart, moving additional 1,422 units. K.I.S.S. continued to descend down the charts to number 118 on the Oricon Albums Chart and number 94 on Japan's Top Billboard Albums Chart, with additional 1,008 units. By its fourth week, K.I.S.S. had exited Japan's Top Billboard Albums Chart, however remained on Japan's Oricon Albums Chart, while falling to number 153 and moving another additional 625 units. In its fifth and final week, K.I.S.S. had fallen to number 188 on the Oricon Albums Chart, moving another additional 485 units. In the United States, K.I.S.S. debuted and peaked at number seventy-four on Billboard's Top R&B/Hip-Hop Albums chart for the week of February 11, 2012. This marked Mya's first album chart entry in eight years as well as her lowest-charting effort to date. K.I.S.S. failed to debut on the Billboard 200 album chart or any other music market.

== Track listing ==
K.I.S.S. (Keep It Sexy & Simple) – standard edition
No.	Title	Writer(s)	Producer(s)	Length
1.	"K.I.S.S."	Mya Harrison; Edwin Serrano; Autumn Rowe; Christopher Moore	Chuck Harmony	3:54
2.	"Rear View Mirror" (featuring Sean Paul)	Harrison; Sean Paul Henriques	PJ Bianco; Zach Hannah	3:54
3.	"Fabulous Life"	Jeff Miyahara; Andreas Levander; Serrano; Harrison	Miyahara; Fredro	3:58
4.	"Mess Up My Hair"	Lindsay Fields; Nia Myricks; Harrison	Young Yonny; Desmond J. "BigHeadDez" Peterson	3:32
5.	"Fugitive of Love"	Carmael M. Frith; Harrison	Rich Shelton; Loren Hill; Michael Barney; Aaron Bennett	4:06
6.	"Love Me Some You" (featuring Marques Houston)	Atozzio Towns; Houston	Young Yonny	3:32
7.	"Mr. Incredible"	Fields; Myricks; Harrison	Young Yonny	4:41
8.	"Problem + Solution"	Tiwa Savage; Shawn Stockman	John Ho	4:34
9.	"Runnin' Back" (featuring Iyaz)	Kyle Schrom; Iyobasa Ighedosa; Caleb Middlebrooks	Young Yonny; Mr. INT	3:29
10.	"Before You Say Goodbye"	Daisuke Imai; Serrano; Harrison	Daisuke "D.I." Imai	4:06
11.	"Sorry"	Kristal Oliver	Carvin & Ivan	3:43
12.	"Love Comes Love Goes"	Julian Brazier	Duwayne "DaDa" Mills; HardWerk	4:50
13.	"Evolve"	Delisha Thomas; Maurice Carpenter; Harrison	Lee Major	3:28
14.	"Alive" (bonus track)	Serrano; Harrison	DJ Komori; UTA	3:50
Total length:				55:37

K.I.S.S. (Keep It Sexy & Simple) – North American standard edition
No.	Title	Writer(s)	Producer(s)	Length
1.	"K.I.S.S."	Harrison; Serrano; Rowe; Moore	Chuck Harmony	3:54
2.	"Rear View Mirror" (featuring Sean Paul)	Harrison; Henriques	PJ Bianco; Zach Hannah	3:54
3.	"Take Him Out" (featuring Spice)	Harrison; Grace Hamilton; Michael Boog; Junior Sanchez	Sanchez; Boog^{[a]}	3:21
4.	"Fabulous Life"	Miyahara; Levander; Serrano; Harrison	Miyahara; Fredro	3:58
5.	"Earthquake" (featuring Trina)	Fields; Cristal Brightharp; Myricks; Katrina Taylor; Kevon Ford; Kris Day	Young Yonny; BigHeadDez	3:19
6.	"Mess Up My Hair" (featuring Beenie Man)	Fields; Nia Myricks; Harrison	Young Yonny; Peterson	3:32
7.	"Break Your Neck"	Carmael M. Frith; Harrison	Shelton; Hill; Barney^{[a]}; Bennett^{[a]}	3:14
8.	"Fugitive of Love"	Frith; Harrison	Shelton; Hill; Barney; Bennett	4:06
9.	"Can I"	Tyquandra Stephens; Harrison	Snatch & Grab	4:27
10.	"Love Me Some You" (featuring Marques Houston)	Towns; Houston	Young Yonny	3:32
11.	"Mr. Incredible"	Fields; Myricks; Harrison	Young Yonny	4:41
12.	"Problem + Solution"	Savage; Stockman	John Ho	4:34
13.	"Love Comes Love Goes"	Brazier	Mills; HardWerk^{[b]}	4:50
14.	"Evolve"	Thomas; Carpenter; Harrison	Major	3:28
Total length:				54:50

K.I.S.S. (Keep It Sexy & Simple) – North American bonus tracks
No.	Title	Writer(s)	Producer(s)	Length
15.	"It's My Birthday"	Harrison	DJ Drew G	3:29
16.	"Somebody Come Get This Bitch" (featuring Stacie & Lacie)	Harrison; Stacie & Lacie	Reco Lynch	3:07
17.	"Love Me Some You" (solo)	Towns	Young Yonny	3:32
18.	"Mess Up My Hair" (solo)	Fields; Myricks; Harrison	Young Yonny; BigHeadDez	3:32
19.	"Love Is the Answer" (Cedric Gervais starring Mya)	Harrison; Dee Roberts	Cedric Gervais; Sandy Vee	2:57
Total length:				71:27

Notes

- ^{^[a]} signifies a co-producer
- ^{^[b]} signifies an additional producer
- ^{^[c]} signifies a vocal producer

Sample credits

- "Take Him Out" contains a sample of "Pon de Floor" by Major Lazer.
- "Break Your Neck" contains a sample "It Takes Two" by Rob Base and DJ E-Z Rock

== Personnel ==
Visuals and imagery

- Art direction and design – Motoki Mizoguchi
- Clothing design – André Adkins, Leon Frager
- Hair stylist – Yusef
- Make-up – Lisa Hayes
- Photography – Marc Baptiste
- Stylist – Leon Frager

Instruments

- Drums – Alex Selph
- Guitar – Daniel Groover
- Keyboard – Alex Selph
- Piano – Julian Brazer
- Strings – Jonathan Perkins

Technical and production

- Backing vocals – Caramel M. Faith, Tasha J. King, Lindsay Fields, Krystle Oliver, Atozzio Town
- Engineering – PJ Bianco, Mya Harrison, Loren Hill, Mike Johnson, Jared Newcomb, Rich Shelton, Young Yonny
- Mastering – Tucky@parasight
- Mixing – Ivan Barias, Brandon Bishop, Ben Chang, D.O.I., Carvin Haggins, John Ho, Satoshi Hosoi, Mike Johnson, Mike Mo, Frankie Mumbles, Nemhara, Young Yonny
- Recording – Jeff Miyahara

== Charts ==
Chart performance
Chart (2011–2012)	Peak position
Japan Top Albums Sales (Billboard Japan)	61
Japanese Albums (Oricon)	72
US Top R&B/Hip-Hop Albums (Billboard)	74

== Release history ==
List of release dates, showing region, formats, and label
Region	Date	Format	Label
Japan	April 13, 2011	Digital download	Manhattan Recordings; Planet 9
Japan	April 20, 2011	CD	Manhattan Recordings; Planet 9
Canada	December 20, 2011	Digital download	Planet 9
United States	December 20, 2011	Digital download	Planet 9
Australia	February 14, 2012	Digital download	Planet 9/INgrooves
Germany	February 14, 2012	Digital download	Planet 9/INgrooves
Ireland	February 14, 2012	Digital download	Planet 9/INgrooves
Netherlands	February 14, 2012	Digital download	Planet 9/INgrooves
Sweden	February 14, 2012	Digital download	Planet 9/INgrooves
United Kingdom	February 14, 2012	Digital download	Planet 9/INgrooves
