= Mr. Incredible (Mya song) =

Single by Mya

from the album K.I.S.S. (Keep It Sexy & Simple)
- Released: December 16, 2011
- Studio: Da Cave (Cleveland, Ohio); Madd Studios (Houston, Texas)
- Genre: R&B
- Length: 4:40
- Label: Planet 9
- Songwriters: Lindsay "Lindz" Fields; Nia Myricks; Mýa Harrison
- Producer: Young Yonny

Mya singles chronology
"Somebody Come Get This Bitch" (2011)	"Mr. Incredible" (2011)	"Mess Up My Hair" (2012)

"Mr. Incredible" is a song by American recording artist Mya. It was written by Mýa and The Pen Up Dolls duo Lindsay "Lindz" Fields and Nia Myricks for her sixth studio album K.I.S.S. (Keep It Sexy & Simple) (2011), while production was helmed by Young Yonny. The sensual downtempo R&B song, was the third single from K.I.S.S to be lifted from the album.

"Mr. Incredible" was released to iTunes on December 16, 2011. On December 25, 2012, after being voted by fans as their favorite song on the album, Mya presented fans with a music video via Twitter as a way of saying thank you to fans that supported the album.

== Music video ==
=== Background and synopsis ===
Tonight at 10 p.m. (Eastern Standard Time), I'll have a present for you all to unwrap. Stay tuned right here on twitter. #Merry Christmas.

— Harrison's announcement made on Twitter in preparation for the visual.

On December 25, 2012, at approximately 10 p.m. EST Mýa announced on Twitter that she had something exclusive for her fans. Voted by her fans as their favorite song on the album, Harrison presented fans with an accompanying music video for "Mr. Incredible." The sensual clip which pays homage to the '70s era is dedicated to her fans to thank them for supporting her 2011 album K.I.S.S. (Keep It Sexy & Simple). Directed by Harrison's backup dancer Derek Brown, the visual shows Mýa sporting an afro while soaking in a bathtub wearing only jewelry and pearls as she whispers sweet nothings on the phone in the vintage video. As the video continues, it reveals Harrison retreating to the bathroom where rose petals are laid out in a night of passion with her Mr. Incredible and strolling the sandy shores.

== Formats and track listings ==
Digital download
No.	Title	Length
1.	"Mr. Incredible"	4:40
Total length:		4:40

== Credits and personnel ==
Credits adapted from the liner notes of K.I.S.S. (Keep It Sexy & Simple).

Recording

- Recorded at Da Cave Studios (Cleveland, Ohio) and Madd Studios (Houston, Texas)
- Mixed at iLab Studios (Los Angeles, California)

Personnel

- Mýa – vocals, engineering
- Bishop – mixing
- Young Yonny – engineer, production

== Release history ==
Region	Date	Format	Label	Ref.
United States	December 16, 2011	Digital download	Planet 9	
Canada	December 16, 2011	Digital download	Planet 9	
