= A.S.A.P. (Mya song) =

Single by Mya

from the album Retrospect
- Released: January 30, 2026
- Length: 2:48
- Label: Planet 9; Virgin Music
- Songwriters: Lamar Edwards; Mýa Harrison; Vincent Berry II
- Producers: Edwards; Harrison

Mya singles chronology
"Face to Face" (2025)	"A.S.A.P." (2026)	"Just a Little Bit" (2026)

Music video
- "A.S.A.P." on YouTube

"A.S.A.P." is a song by the American singer Mya and the lead single from her ninth studio album, Retrospect (2026). It was released on January 30, 2026, through Planet 9 and Virgin Music Group. Mya wrote and produced "A.S.A.P." with Lamar "MyGuyMars" Edwards, with additional writing by Vincent Berry II. The song is described as a 1980s-tinged mid-tempo track that is built around the themes of communication and honest within a relationship. A remix featuring 21 Savage was released February 27, 2026.

== Background ==
In mid-January 2026, the singer announced the release of "A.S.A.P.", teasing a new era as well. Speaking about "A.S.A.P.", the singer commented, "This is for my core R&B fans who love feel-good music, with meaningful lyrics that hit the soul. 'ASAP' highlights one reaching a crossroad and choosing clarity by being honest about your wants and needs in times of uncertainty, without fear or hesitation."

== Composition ==
A collaborative effort, between Harrison, Vincent Berry II, and Lamar "MyGuyMars" Edwards; "A.S.A.P." is inspired by personal experiences and observations of contemporary relationships. It is a story about the need to clearly express feelings and expectations without unnecessary ambiguity. With a runtime of two minutes and forty-eight seconds, infused with subtle nods to the sounds of the '80s, "A.S.A.P." is a sultry, "atmospheric", '80s-"informed" and "tinged" mid-tempo groove centered on themes of communication and honesty in an interpersonal relationship. The track finds the singer crooning about a love that is worth fighting for. Hoping for reconciliation with the antagonist, the singer opts for open communication with a lover to work through a rough patch – "I swear we gotta talk, yeah we gotta ASAP / We both messed up and we way off track," she sings in the chorus.

== Critical reception ==
Billboard picked "A.S.A.P." as one of their must hear R&B/hip-hop songs "Fresh Picks of the Week", commenting, "Grammy-winning '00s R&B icon Mýa is gearing up for her first album in eight years, and she's ready to get the ball rolling 'A.S.A.P.'" Similarly, Essence included "A.S.A.P." as part of their "Best New Music" as well.

== Chart performance ==
Ahead of its official release, "A.S.A.P." debuted as one of the most added records at R&B radio. "A.S.A.P." debuted at number 22 on Adult R&B Songs chart, marking the singer's first entry on that chart.

== Music video ==
Directed by City James, the music video for "A.S.A.P." dubs a retro-modern aesthetic inspired by the golden era of MTV performance visuals. Each scene is bathed in warm, nostalgic tones—rotary phones, soft-focus lighting, and intimate framing—while maintaining contemporary broadcast-ready clarity. Suspended in time, the visual echoes an era where connection meant picking up the phone or speaking face-to-face. Throughout out the music video, the singer delivers her plea through a pearly rotary phone.

== Remix ==
Following the song's original version, the singer teamed up with rapper 21 Savage for the song's remix. In contrast, to the original's smooth, mid-tempo foundation, the duo offers a new spin and transforms the track into a dynamic, layered back-and-forth exchange. Performance wise, the singer vocal anchors the record with clarity and conviction, while 21 Savage delivers a focused, hard-hitting verse that adds urgency and perspective. Upon its release, the remix received generally favorable reception from several publications. (Note: Essence, Vibe, Billboard)

== Credits and personnel ==
Credits lifted from the liner notes of "A.S.A.P."

- Lamar "MyGuyMars" Edwards – lyricist and producer
- Mya Harrison – lyricist, recording engineer, producer
- Vincent Berry II – lyricist
- Reggie "Red Vision" Rojo – mixing engineer and mastering engineer
- Dennis "Roc.am" Jones – Atmos mixing engineer and Atmos mastering engineer
- Derek Anderson – recording engineer

== Charts ==
Weekly chart performance
Chart (2026)	Peak position
US Adult R&B Songs (Billboard)	16

== Release history ==
Release history
Date	Formats	Version	Labels	Ref.
January 30, 2026	Digital download; streaming	Original	Planet 9; Virgin Music	
February 27, 2026	Digital download; streaming	Remix featuring 21 Savage	Planet 9; Virgin Music	
