= Vincent Berry II =

American songwriter and producer

Vincent Le'Carl Berry II
- Born: August 1, 1985 (age 41); Detroit, Michigan, United States
- Education: Morehouse College
- Musical career
- Genres: R&B; soul; gospel; hip-hop
- Occupations: Songwriter; producer
- Label: ASCAP

Vincent Berry is an American songwriter and producer, best known for writing "Sandcastles" from Beyoncé's 2016 album Lemonade, as well as various songs for Mary J. Blige and Tamar Braxton, among others.

Berry, a Morehouse College student who dropped out in his senior year to pursue songwriting, was homeless at the time he penned what was initially titled "We Built Sandcastles That Washed Away", a song about the end of a decade-long relationship. After several re-writes with the help of additional co-writers Midian Mathers, Malik Yusef, and Beyoncé Knowles, as well as a "tear-filled" pitching session with Parkwood Entertainment A&R executive Teresa LaBarbera Whites, the song was placed onto Knowles' Grammy-winning album with a "more hopeful" ending than was originally created. Berry avoided signing a traditional co-publishing deal for the song, and consequently shares ownership. He has since co-written "Blind", a Tamar Braxton single from her 2017 album Bluebird of Happiness that reached the Billboard Adult R&B Airplay charts.

== Songwriting, guitar and production credits ==
Credits are courtesy of Discogs, Tidal, Spotify, and AllMusic.

Title	Year	Artist	Album
"Kill The Dragon"	2014	Kierra Sheard	Graceland
"Our Love"	2015	Nico & Vinz	Cornerstone
"Sandcastles"	2016	Beyoncé	Lemonade
"Blind"	2017	Tamar Braxton	Bluebird of Happiness
"How I Feel"	2017	Tamar Braxton	Bluebird of Happiness
"Empty Boxes"	2017	Tamar Braxton	Bluebird of Happiness
"Find the Love"	2017	Mary J. Blige	Strength of a Woman
"Body" (Featuring Migos)	2017	Sean Paul	Mad Love the Prequel
"Don't Let Go" (Featuring Rico Love)	2017	Bone Thugs	New Waves
"Simple Song" (With Jussie Smollett & Rumer Willis)	2017	Empire Cast	Non-album single
"All to Myself"	2019	Baby Rose	To Myself
"Lolita"	2019	Take 3	Star: Original Soundtrack From Season 3
"Mehr Als Mich"	2020	Gentleman	Blaue Stunde
"No Restrictions"	2024	Jordin Sparks	No Restrictions
"A.S.A.P." (solo or featuring 21 Savage)	2026	Mya	Retrospect
"No Pressure" (featuring Snoop Dogg)	2026	Mya	Retrospect
"Life Is What You Make It"	2026	Mya	Retrospect

== Awards and nominations ==
Year	Ceremony	Award	Result	Ref
2017	59th Annual Grammy Awards	Grammy Award for Album of the Year (Lemonade)	Nominated	
