= Worth It (Mya song) =

Single by Mya introducing Mýa Lan$ky
- Released: July 2, 2021
- Genre: Conscious hip hop
- Length: 2:52
- Label: Planet 9; MGM; Orchard
- Songwriters: Mya Harrison; Cliff Lewis; Kesington Kross
- Producer: Lamar "MyGuyMars" Edwards

Mýa singles chronology
"Space and Time" (2020)	"Worth It" (2021)	"Whine" (2023)

Music video
- "Worth It" on YouTube

"Worth It" is a song recorded by American singer Mya introducing her alter ego Mýa Lan$ky. An inspirational, melodic hip hop track, "Worth It" was written by Cliff Lewis, Kes Kross and Mya with production helmed by frequent collaborator Lamar "MyGuyMars" Edwards. It explores the themes of faith, spirituality, resilience, success, and triumph. "Worth It," a standalone single was released July 2, 2021 on the singer's label imprint Planet 9 with distribution via Orchard. Upon the single's release, an official black and white lyric music video followed.

== Background ==
In an interview with Rated R&B the singer discussed the inspiration behind "Worth It." Mya explained, "Worth It" has been in her music archive for years and addresses a lot of people coming at her asking, "Why this, Why that," and she finally giving a response. A hip hop song, she and frequent collaborator Lamar "MyGuyMars" Edwards created "Worth It" in the spirit of Nipsey Hussle, who used to record right underneath of them on his Victory Lap album. The singer recalls, "His spirit was all throughout the studio when she was recording the song." While the singer has spit bars on songs throughout her independent projects, where she flows and speak facts – something she incorporates into her live performances, she opted to release "Worth It" as a single as opposed to relinquish the track as an album cut which introduces her rap alter ego Mýa Lan$ky, an alternate version of herself, the singer noted. For her alter ego, the singer credits notorious crime accountant Meyer Lansky as her inspiration for her new handle.

== Composition ==
While speaking with Sheen magazine, Mya detailed what "Worth It" was about, responding, "Worth It" is about keeping the faith and fight in your grind, centering self in spirituality while addressing and combatting outside voices, redefining success, and eventually reaching victory with peace of mind with patience and of course prayer. A collaborative effort, "Worth It" lyrics were written by songwriter Cliff Lewis and Mya. On top of writing the song's lyrics, the singer arranged the track's vocal production and served as engineer as well. While singer–songwriter Kes Kross adopted the song's melody. Additional background vocals were provided by singer–songwriter Sha Sha Jones. Frequent collaborator and musician Lamar "MyGuyMars" Edwards handled the single's production. Malcolm "Tariq" Smith, another frequent collaborator was responsible for mixing and mastering.

With a common runtime of two minutes and fifty-two seconds, "Worth It," a compelling blend of boastful and introspective lyrics is an inspirational song which encompasses ancestral elements of hip-hop/soul where Mya employs a rap-sung cadence, detailing the trials and tribulations of being an artist and its fruitful rewards. Reflecting on her career and tenacity, the singer bars include: "How I keep looking younger and younger/ It's the genes and all this foreign fruit I keeps in my stomach/ Not to mention I'd rather prefer to stay out the public/ Cuz I'm on it, best believe I own it publishing and masters/I mastered my craft and yeah you know/ My foot's on the gas." For her alter ego's blunt cadence, she cites conscious and classic hip-hop trailblazers such as Mos Def, Common, Digable Planets, Black Thought, André 3000, and Erykah Badu.

== Track listing ==
Digital download/streaming

1. "Worth It" – 2:52

== Credits and personnel ==
Credits lifted from the liner notes of "Worth It."

- Lamar "MyGuyMars" Edwards – production
- Malcolm "Tariq" Smith – mixing, mastering
- Cliff Lewis – songwriting
- Kes Kross – melody
- Mya Harrison – songwriting, vocal production, engineering
- Sha Sha Jones – additional background vocals

== Release history ==
Region	Date	Format	Label	Ref.
Various	July 2, 2021	Digital download; streaming	Planet 9; MGM; Orchard	
