= Sandcastles (song) =

Song by Beyoncé

from the album Lemonade
- Released: June 15, 2016
- Recorded: 2014
- Studio: The Beehive Studios, Los Angeles
- Genre: Soul
- Length: 3:03
- Label: Parkwood; Columbia
- Composer: Vincent Berry II
- Lyricists: Vincent Berry II; Malik Yusef; Beyoncé Knowles; Midian Mathers
- Producers: Beyoncé Knowles; Vincent Berry II

Music video
- "Sandcastles" on YouTube

"Sandcastles" is a song by American singer Beyoncé. It is the eighth track on her sixth studio album, Lemonade (2016), released through Parkwood Entertainment and Columbia Records. The song's music video is part of Beyoncé's 2016 film Lemonade, aired on HBO alongside the album's release.

== Background ==
"Sandcastles" was initially written by Vincent Berry II, inspired by the heartbreak of a ten-year relationship with a girlfriend. It was written together with Malik Yusef, who came up with an idea for a track called "We Built Sandcastles That Washed Away" which he sang on a piano with "gospel-influenced lyrics". Vincent Berry II immediately related to the lyrics and promised it would be his "last time writing a song about this girl" while also "putting it all in this". The song was initially offered to recording artist Teyana Taylor, although Berry found it more suitable for Beyoncé. However, Taylor did not record the song and Berry was invited to a studio with songwriter Midian Mathers, who cried upon hearing "Sandcastles". Berry, Mathers, and Yusef further worked on the song, with Mathers singing it as a demo.

Mathers then played the song to Teresa LaBarbera Whites, an A&R executive at the publishing company BMG Rights Management who was the one that signed Beyoncé and her girl group Destiny's Child to the record label Columbia Records at the beginning of their careers. When she told Mathers that she was collecting songs for Beyoncé's upcoming sixth studio album, Mathers presented his audio of "Sandcastles". During an interview with Los Angeles Times, Berry recalled the moment the song was played to LaBarbera, "Midian was like he's gonna kill me and he didn't give permission but I think this is the kind of song Beyonce needs to sing. And when she played it Teresa started to cry. I did this song to heal myself and I think that's what people are experiencing when they hear it."

Beyoncé received "Sandcastles" in February 2015, more than a year after the song was written. Berry, who was homeless at the time when the song was included on the track listing of Lemonade, did not want to sign a publishing agreement and opted for keeping ownership of the track, saying: "I wanted to own it and that's a harder road. That meant being homeless and sleeping in cars and garages and studios and that's what I was willing to do. I knew I couldn't sign a publishing deal knowing what they are — essentially a high-interest loan. Why would I take that kind of deal?" Eventually, he received a call from the singer's team notifying him that the song he wrote was included on the album, along with a production credit he would share with Beyoncé. The final version of the song featured new lyrics at the end written by Beyoncé: "And your heart is broken cause I walked away / Show me your scars and I won't walk away. And I know I promised that I couldn't stay, baby / [But] every promise don't work out that way" which according to Berry made more sense as she was inspired by a husband and wife relationship unlike his.

== Composition ==
"Sandcastles" is a ballad with themes of forgiveness and reconciliation. As stated by Gerrick D. Kennedy from Los Angeles Times, upon the release of Lemonade many thought it was inspired by an infidelity her husband Jay-Z committed. According to Kennedy, "Sandcastles" is "one of the album's most emotional tracks" was also triggering such allegations.

== Critical reception ==
Everett True for The Independent compliments Beyoncé's vocal performance on "Sandcastles", describing it as exhibiting "rawness of emotion and tear duct-filling emotion".

== Music video ==
The song's music video is part of a one-hour film with the same title as its parent album, originally aired on HBO. The video features scenes of a tearful Beyoncé together with Jay-Z who is seen embracing her, and laying together with her. Gerrick D. Kennedy from Los Angeles Times called it "the most intimate of displays for pop’s most intensely private couple".

In the music video, a black bowl repaired with the traditional Japanese technique of kintsugi is featured at 1.10 minutes. Kintsugi is the art of repairing with gold, treating the breakage and repair as part of the history of an object, and often quoted as a symbol of resilience and repair. The lyrics echo this visual: "If we're gonna heal, let it be glorious" "Dishes smashed on my counter from our last encounter" "And your heart is broken 'cause I walked away" "Show me your scars and I won't walk away" .

== Commercial performance ==
After the release of Lemonade, "Sandcastles" debuted on Billboard Hot 100 chart at number 43 and Hot R&B/Hip-Hop songs chart at number 27.

== Usage in media ==
The song was featured at the end of the series finale of The Mindy Project in 2017.

== Charts ==
Chart (2016)	Peak position
Australia Urban Singles (ARIA)	11
Canada Hot 100 (Billboard)	79
France (SNEP)	109
Scottish Singles Sales (Official Charts)	45
Sweden Heatseeker Songs (Sverigetopplistan)	16
UK Singles (Official Charts)	57
UK Hip Hop/R&B (Official Charts)	21
US Billboard Hot 100	43
US Hot R&B/Hip-Hop Songs (Billboard)	27

== Certifications ==
Region	Certification	Certified units/sales
United States (RIAA)	Gold	500,000^{‡}
^{‡} Sales+streaming figures based on certification alone.
