= Robb McDaniels =

British-American businessman (born 1974)

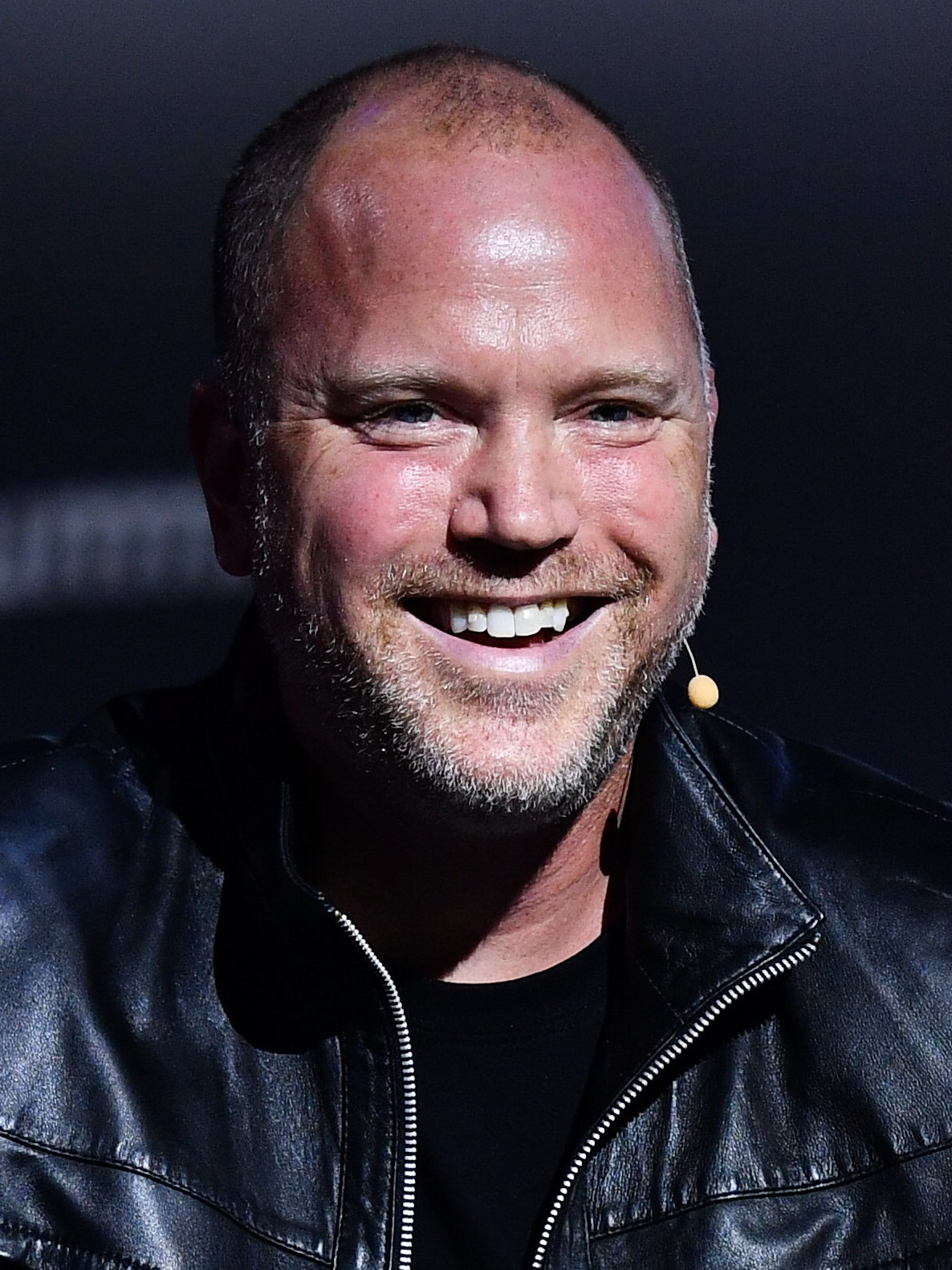
- McDaniels in 2021
- Born: 10 May 1974 (age 51); London, England, United Kingdom
- Occupation: Businessman
- Years active: 2004-present

Robb McDaniels is a media and technology entrepreneur, investor and current CEO of Beatport. Founded in 2004 as the principal source of music for DJs, Beatport today is the worldwide home of music for DJs, producers, and their fans.

In early 2016, McDaniels launched Faction Entertainment, a forward-thinking, technology enabled management services business with a client list that included Thievery Corporation, Bonnie McKee, Paul Oakenfold, Youngblood Hawke, Jamestown Revival, Vassy, and Phantoms. While serving as Beatport CEO, McDaniels continues to serve as Venture Advisor at Dubai-based investment company, TechInvest, and Executive Chairman at Faction, which has expanded its presence with the dance & electronic community.

Previously, McDaniels was the founder and CEO of INgrooves where, since 2002, he built the company into a full-service distribution and artist services operation. Under his leadership, INgrooves managed North American digital distribution for Universal Music Group, as well as more than 4 million songs for thousands of artists and labels.

== Early life ==
Born in London to American parents, Robb attended Trinity College in Hartford, Connecticut as well as the London School of Economics.

== Career ==
McDaniel's leadership and innovative thinking has attracted the likes of Forbes magazine, Los Angeles Times, New York Times, Business Week, Entrepreneur, and many others. In 2013 he was asked to give the keynote address at the annual gathering of the National Association of Music Retailers (NARM). He was also recently named to Billboard Magazine's 2012 "40 under 40 – Power Players on the Rise" and was named in 2010 to Digital Media Wire's "25 Executives to Watch in Digital Media".
