= Face to Face (Mya song) =

Single by Mýa
- Released: May 9, 2025
- Genre: R&B
- Length: 3:55
- Label: Planet 9
- Songwriters: John Groover; Lamar "MyGuyMars" Edwards; Michael Cox; Mýa Harrison; Paige Wheatland; Philip Adetumbi
- Producers: Mike & Keys; Lamar "MyGuyMars" Edwards; Mýa

Mýa singles chronology
"Whine" (2023)	"Face to Face" (2025)	"A.S.A.P." (2026)

Lyric video
- "Face to Face" on YouTube

"Face to Face" is a song by the American singer Mýa. An introspective, self-reflection composition, "Face to Face" was composed, arranged, and produced by frequent collaborator MyGuyMars, Mike & Keys, and the singer herself with additional contribution from Paige Wheatland and Philip Adetumbi. Taking foundational influence from the S.O.S. Band, "Face to Face" is a soulful arrangement blending contemporary R&B melodies with subtle hip-hop undertones that addresses themes of self-reflection, spiritual centering and discernment.

Positioned as a standalone record outside of the traditional album cycle, "Face to Face" was released May 9, 2025, on the singer's label Planet 9 in partnership with Virgin Music Group.

== Background and release ==
Announced via press releases, according the singer, "Face to Face" is an introspective reflection of where she at today—offering an intimate glimpse into her soul, thoughts, and path to becoming her best self. Expounding deeper on the origin of the song, she shares, "Face to Face" is about confronting the person in the mirror, embracing every shade, every truth." Additionally she further remarked, "It's an invitation to quiet the noise, listen deeply, and rediscover the power that resides within our own authenticity. It's finding peace by getting real." In conjunction with her label Planet 9, "Face to Face" was released in partnership with Virgin Music Group.

== Composition ==
According to the singer, "Face to Face" is just an extension of the way she write music these days; granting listeners — a deeper look into who she is as a person, which often people hear in interviews but do not hear musically as a single from her. A smooth, bass-rich production courtesy of MyGuyMars, Mike & Keys, and the singer herself, "Face to Face" is a "vibrational," "spiritual" self-reflective track blending timeless R&B tones with contemporary embodiment textures. In her own words, the singer deemed the song as her "spiritual flex" song. Arriving just in time for Mental Health Awareness Month and taking inspiration from the S.O.S. Band, "Face to Face" is a mirror, a meditation, and a reminder that healing starts by getting honest—with God, and with yourself. From a lyrically standpoint, the composition cut through the noise, calling for self-awareness, spiritual honesty, and personal accountability.

== Promotion ==
To promote the release of her single "Face to Face," the singer made guest appearances on Good Morning Washington and Fox 5 Washington where she shared about her time growing up in the area, working at BET in D.C. in her teenage years, and plans for her upcoming tour as well. During the release period of her new single, the singer will send heartfelt love letters to her fans, team, DJs, the creative community and those who have inspired her along her journey. In August, the singer guest co-hosted Fox 5 New York's Good Night New York where she previewed glimpse of her music video for "Face to Face."

== Music video ==
=== Background ===
Behind the inspiration for the music video, the singer shared in an exclusive interview with People magazine, "she wanted everyone to see themselves in different stages and literally give permission or inspire people to look within, but also at different versions of themselves — because that's what life is all about." According to her, the music video is about "moving forward to the next step in the next level or phase" of life. Directed by Brandon "BPace" Pace, the music video was filmed on location at a modern house with a pool and dramatic outdoor staircase, the visual offers a striking interpretation of the track's themes of vulnerability, clarity, and inner strength, allowing audiences a glimpse into the singer's past, present and future. On September 16, 2025, the singer premiered the official music video for "Face to Face".

=== Synopsis ===
The music video for "Face to Face" begins with the singer looking at her reflection in a mosaic of broken mirror pieces before she fades out and is replaced by a young girl peering into the mirror. The youngster represents her as a child and later audiences are introduced to an older girl depicting the singer as a teenager. An interracial couple in the roles of her parents are busy arguing and carrying on while the girls display a range of emotions. In the midst the drama happening in the background, present-day Mýa is at peace. Eventually, she shares the screen with the younger versions of herself before being seen as her much older self from the future.

== Remixes ==
Extending the impact of the original single, the singer released a series of remixes. On August 15, 2025, she teased and previewed a remix on Instagram with the caption "FaceToFace Summer Remix" set for an August 19 release. Produced by Beatz Mikey, the Caribbean-influenced Summer remix infuses the track with breezy, uptempo R&B textures and was released four days later on August 19, 2025. The following week, on August 26, 2025, the singer released the DMV remix featuring fellow DMV native artist ADÉ which adds a sharp lyrical edge that connects back to the singer's hometown roots.

== Track listing ==
Digital download/streaming

1. "Face to Face" – 3:55
2. "Face to Face" (radio mix 1) – 3:33
3. "Face to Face" (radio mix 2) – 3:12

== Credits and personnel ==
Credits lifted from Apple Music.

=== Personnel ===
- LaMar "MyGuyMars" Edwards – songwriting, producer
- Michael Cox – songwriting, producer
- John Groove – songwriting, producer
- Mýa Harrison – songwriting, vocal producer, recording engineer
- Dennis Rocam Jones – immersive mixing engineer, immersive mastering engineer
- Reggie "Red Vision" Rojo Jr. – mastering engineer, mixing engineer
- Paige Wheatland – songwriting
- Philip Adetumbi – songwriting

== Release history ==
Release dates and formats for "Face to Face"
Region	Date	Format	Label	Ref.
Various	May 9, 2025	Digital download; streaming	Planet 9; Virgin Music Group	
Various	August 19, 2025	Digital download; streaming	Planet 9; Virgin Music Group	
Various	August 26, 2025	Digital download; streaming	Planet 9; Virgin Music Group	
