= The Weekender (Northeastern Pennsylvania weekly) =

American weekly newspaper

- Type: Monthly, from June 2021; weekly prior to this
- Headquarters: 15 N. Main Street, Wilkes-Barre, Pennsylvania 18711, United States
- Website: theweekender.com

The Weekender is an arts entertainment weekly published in Wilkes-Barre, Pennsylvania, for the city and surrounding northeastern Pennsylvania communities, with distribution every Wednesday.

The Weekender started as an independent entertainment weekly in 1993. It was purchased by the Times Leader group later in 1993. The Weekender claimed to have grown to be northeastern Pennsylvania's arts and entertainment weekly with the highest circulation, reporting that it had distributed 40,000 copies in print, through more than 1,000 locations, covering five Pennsylvania counties, with more than 174,000 readers.
