= Space and Time (Mya song) =

Single by Mya
- Released: May 29, 2020
- Studio: The Village Studio (Santa Monica, California)
- Genre: R&B
- Length: 3:56
- Label: Planet 9; Orchard
- Songwriters: Charles T. Harmon; Claude Kelly; Mya Harrison
- Producer: Louis York

Mýa singles chronology
"You Got Me, Part II" (2020)	"Space and Time" (2020)	"Worth It" (2021)

Music video
- "Space and Time" on YouTube

"Space and Time" is a song recorded by American singer Mya. It was produced by Louis York and written by Chuck Harmony, Claude Kelly, and Mya. "Space and Time" explores themes of humanity, self-care, healing, and peace of mind. It was released as a standalone single May 29, 2020 on the singer's label imprint Planet 9 with distribution via Orchard. An accompanying music video followed preceding the single's release.

== Meaning ==
In interviews, Mya has indicated that "Space and Time" is about "granting yourself permission to unplug from the world and to practise a little self-care".

In a segment with The Morning Show, she explained, "A lot of people have been facing depression and the rate has actually increased worldwide." She continued, "A lot of fear has been instilled, so I thought this was the best time to refocus and also reassess the important things in life." She concluded by saying, "Spend time with yourself and also loved ones, and get back to unplugging from the world - breathing and practising that self-love to heal."

Mya also discussed the song with British GQ, saying "This song is all about providing healing vibes, but also with a statement of allowing yourself permission to act upon self care."

== Background and composition ==
A Louis York production, "Space and Time" was a collaborative effort between Chuck Harmony, Claude Kelly and Mya and recorded at The Village studio in Santa Monica, California. Claude Kelly and Mya wrote the song's lyrics while Chuck Harmony created the melody and handled the song's overall production. Together the trio developed the song's arrangement. Dustin Richardson, an associate demoed "Space and Time" as a reference track for the singer. The finalized version was mixed at Platinum Door studio in Los Angeles, California. Additional contribution was provided by Billy Centenaro and Jack Zrehigian. The former was responsible for engineering while the latter mastered "Space and Time" at Oasis Mastering in Burbank, California.

With a common runtime of three minutes and fifty-six seconds, "Space and Time" is guitar-driven and evokes the lighthearted and happy feelings of earlier material like "Fallen" but with a modern twist. Thematically, the song is composed of uplifting messages for anyone ready to change their mindset and embrace their new destiny. Harrison's light tone is layered throughout the chorus as the song progresses.

== Music video ==
The music video for "Space and Time" was directed in collaboration between Kirk Fraser and May 3 Films. Shot during the lockdown, Harrison served as producer, editor, and creative director.

== Track listing ==
Digital download/streaming

1. "Space and Time" – 3:56

== Credits and personnel ==
Credits lifted from the liner notes of "Space and Time."

=== Recording ===
- Recorded at The Village (Santa Monica, California)
- Mixed at Platinum Door (Los Angeles, California)
- Mastered at Oasis Mastering (Burbank, California)

=== Personnel ===
- Charles T. Harmon – melody, arrangement, production
- Claude Kelly – songwriting, arrangement
- Mya Harrison – songwriting, arrangement
- Billy Centenaro – engineering
- Dustin Richardson – mix preparation, rough mix
- Jack Zrehigian – mastering

== Release history ==
Region	Date	Format	Label	Ref.
Various	May 29, 2020	Digital download; streaming	Planet 9; Orchard	
