= Planet 9 (record label) =

- Parent company: Universal Music Group; Sony Music
- Founded: 2008
- Founder: Mýa
- Distributors: Manhattan Recordings; INgrooves; Fontana; The Orchard; Virgin Music Group
- Genre: R&B; hip hop; dance
- Country of origin: U.S.
- Location: Washington D.C.
- Official website: www.myamya.com

Planet 9 is an American independent record label founded by American singer Mýa. After parting ways with her major label, Universal Motown and following the advice of her mentor J. Prince, Harrison established and developed her own independent label with a new business approach in mind to create and release music. Following the events of her fourth studio album, Liberation (2007) being mishandled and accidentally leaking on the internet, she was contracted by R&B based Japanese record company, Manhattan Recordings. Through that label, she exclusively release and self-funded, recorded, and engineered her first independent project, Sugar & Spice (2008). Three years later, she exclusively released the follow-up, the dance and club orientated K.I.S.S. (Keep It Sexy & Simple) (2011) through the same label.

Since its creation, Harrison through her label Planet 9 has released thirteen independent studio projects. Following the exclusive releases in Japan, she recorded and released three relatively R&B rooted EPs, With Love (2014), Sweet XVI (2014), and Love Elevation Suite (2015). In 2016, she released the Grammy nominated, Smoove Jones. TKO (The Knock Out) arrived in 2018 to honor the 20th anniversary of her debut album, Mýa (1998). In 2026, the singer released her ninth studio album, the throwback-inspired Retrospect. Under the Planet 9 moniker, Harrison expanded its brand and venture into winery and apparel. Produced in partnership with Frey Vineyards, Harrison created Planet 9 Fine Wine, an organic vegan wine.

== History ==
=== Career beginnings ===
Prior to Mýa recording and releasing her first independent album overseas, she released three successful studio albums in the United States; 1998's Mýa, 2000's Fear of Flying and 2003's Moodring. In 1998, Mýa released her debut self-titled album, which peaked at No. 13 on the Top R&B/Hip-Hop Albums chart. Fear of Flying (2000) fared even better at No. 7, with the single "Case of the Ex" reaching No. 2 on the Hot 100. In 2001, she took home a Grammy for "Lady Marmalade", her massive No. 1 single with Pink, Christina Aguilera, Lil' Kim, and Missy Elliott. A role in the hit film Chicago and other acting opportunities followed. After she released Moodring in 2003, with the exception of a popular stint on Dancing with the Stars in 2009 (she finished second), it seemed as if Mýa had left the entertainment industry.

=== Hiatus and leakage ===
In 2004, after the Moodring album, she ended up in a year-long litigation with management. In late 2005, Harrison made a transition within the Universal system from Interscope to Universal Motown. In 2007 her fourth studio album Liberation was accidentally released in Japan when the release date changed. At the time, she was with Motown/Universal; her lawyer advised that she not waste time and money taking the issue to court, so Harrison decided to go independent instead.

=== Independency ===
At the advice of her mentors Prince and J. Prince in 2008, Harrison created an independent label called Planet 9. After parting ways with her major label Universal Motown, she decided to continue to make music but with a different business approach in mind. So Harrison, created her own label Planet 9, and did different types of deals. Furthermore, she was offered a non-exclusive deal with a Japanese based R&B label Manhattan Recordings after the leakage of her fourth studio album. Through that label and deal Harrison has released Sugar & Spice (2008), Sugar & Spice: The Perfect Edition (2009), and K.I.S.S. (Keep It Sexy & Simple) (2011) exclusively in Japan. Subsequently, she continues to release independent projects With Love (2014) Sweet XVI (2014), Love Elevation Suite (2015), and most recently Smoove Jones (2016) which received a grammy nomination for Best R&B Album. In honor of her twentieth anniversary, Mýa released her eighth independent project, TKO (The Knock Out) in April 2018. In 2026, she released her ninth LP, the throwback-inspired Retrospect.

== Discography ==
=== Studio albums ===
- Sugar & Spice (2008)
- Sugar & Spice: The Perfect Edition (2009)
- K.I.S.S. (Keep It Sexy & Simple) (2011)
- Smoove Jones (2016)
- TKO (The Knock Out) (2018)
- Retrospect (2026)

=== Mixtape ===
- Beauty & the Streets Vol. 1 (2009)

=== EPs ===
- With Love (2014)
- Sweet XVI (2014)
- Love Elevation Suite (2015)
- Whine (Dance Mix) (2023)

== Filmography ==
=== Music videos ===
- Coolin' (2017)
- Ready for Whatever (2017)
- You Got Me (2018)
- G.M.O. (Got My Own) (2018)
- With You (2019)
- Down (2019)
- The Truth (2020)
- Space and Time (2020)
- Worth It (2021)
- It's All About Me (25th Anniversary Remix) (2023)
- Whine (2023)
- Face to Face (2025)
- A.S.A.P. (2026)
- Just a Little Bit (2026)
- Give It to You (2026)

== Winery ==
- Planet 9 Fine Wine
