= SOHH =

Hip hop news website

- Website type: Music website
- Owner: 4Control Media
- Creators: Felicia Palmer, Steven Samuel
- Website: sohh.com
- Commercial: Yes
- Registration: Optional
- Launched: 1996
- Current status: Defunct

SOHH (Support Online Hip Hop) was an American hip hop news website. Felicia Palmer and Steven Samuel founded the website in 1996. In 2000, Rolling Stone magazine writer Mark Binelli called it the "best overall hip-hop site".

== History ==
Felicia Palmer attended Cornell University to become a veterinarian, but later changed her focus to business management studies. After graduating, she worked for a small licensing firm founded by two young women. She credited her experience there for giving her the motivation to launch SOHH. Her husband, Steven Samuel, was part the rap group, the Troubleneck Brothers, who released their first album, Fuck All Y'all, in 1992. Palmer and Samuel officially launched the website in 1996. After twelve months, the membership grew to 75,000 people. Samuel stated, "We picked up a book on HTML and pretty much figured out how to launch the site in a week". SOHH began as a magazine, but was changed to a website due to high printing costs. It was the longest running online hip hop community. In 2007, the website averaged 1.5 million unique visitors a month. As of 2024, the website has been defunct.

=== Defacement ===
In June 2008, a series of attacks took place against the website. The message board section was infiltrated first, which SOHH then shut down. On June 23, a group which identified themselves as "Anonymous" organized DDOS attacks against the website, successfully eliminating 60% of the website's service capacity. On June 27, the hackers utilized cross-site scripting to deface the website's main page with satirical images and headlines referencing numerous racial stereotypes and slurs, and also stole information from SOHH employees.

Following the defacement, the website was shut down by its administration. AllHipHop, an unrelated website, also had its forum raided. By the evening of June 27, AllHipHop was back online and released an official statement in which it referred to the perpetrators as "cyber terrorists" and announced that it would cooperate with SOHH "to ensure the capture of these criminals and prevention of repeat offenses." On June 30, SOHH placed an official statement on its main page, alleging that the attackers were "specifically targeting Black, Hispanic, Asian and Jewish youth who ascribe to hip-hop culture," and listed several hip hop oriented websites which it claimed were also attacked by the hackers. It concluded with a notice that it would be cooperating with the Federal Bureau of Investigation (FBI).

Palmer confirmed that an FBI probe was ongoing, and that each time the website was attacked, data on the suspects was retrieved. She indicated that some of the attackers were "located within the United States, between the ages of 16-21" and that a few of them were based in Waco, Texas. Initially under the impression that the hackers were pranksters, she came to believe they were "beyond pranksters" and the attack was racist in nature.
