= Ingrooves =

Music marketing and distribution company

Ingrooves Music Group
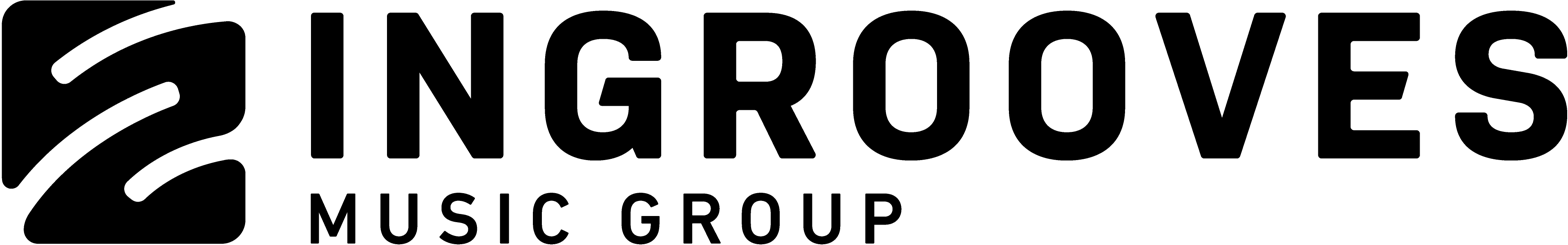
- Type: Music distribution, analytics, rights services, marketing and technology
- Founded: 2002; 24 years ago
- Founders: Robb McDaniels, Adam Hiles, Matthew Burns
- Defunct: October 19, 2023; 2 years ago
- Fate: Folded into Virgin Music Group
- Successor: Virgin Music Group
- Headquarters: Los Angeles, California
- Parent: Virgin Music Group
- Website: ingrooves.com

Ingrooves Music Group (sometimes shortened to Ingrooves, and formerly stylized as INgrooves) was a global independent music marketing service and distribution company which provided custom services for artists and independent record labels, owned by Universal Music Group. They used proprietary distribution systems and focused on analytics and reporting technologies, as well as their own platform that artists and labels used to manage business.

== History ==
Ingrooves was founded in San Francisco in 2002 by Robb McDaniels, Matt Burns and Adam Hiles. As of 2015, the Ingrooves retail network included more than 600 services and storefronts.

In 2008, Universal Music Group (UMG) selected Ingrooves's parent company, Isolation Network Inc., to digitally distribute all of its music in North America. Ingrooves and Mexican label DEL Records formed an online distribution agreement in 2010. The investment firm Shamrock Capital purchased a majority stake in the company in 2010 for $20 million. In 2012 Ingrooves took over Fontana Distribution, which was owned by Universal Music Group. The deal added 200 labels to the Ingrooves roster, and expanded its services to include physical distribution of recordings. The deal also allowed Ingrooves to use Universal’s local sales forces in selling products in retail stores. Ingrooves, financed by Shamrock, paid Universal Music Group $10 million and gave Universal a 22 percent stake in Ingrooves. Ingrooves subsequently expanded its services to include physical distribution.

In 2012, the company launched an Artist Services division, INresidence, a project-based service for established artists and emerging artists releasing music independently. They established a Rights Services division dedicated to music publishing, synch licensing and neighboring rights in 2013.

As of 2022, Ingrooves was headquartered in Los Angeles, with offices in North America, South America, Europe, Asia, Africa, India, the Philippines, Australia and New Zealand. Ingrooves expanded globally by partnering with independent labels and artists in countries worldwide, including Australia’s OneLove in 2017 and Latin America’s Talento Uno in 2018.

In March 2018, Shamrock Capital began seeking offers for Ingrooves, around approximately $100 million to sell. On February 12, 2019, Universal Music Group acquired the remaining shares of the company.

Ingrooves signed Rich Music to a distribution deal in 2018 and Pitbull’s Mr. 305 Inc. to a worldwide distribution deal in 2019 for all of the label’s releases. The same year Ingrooves renewed its distribution partnership with independent British record label Dirty Hit. The company expanded into Brazil through a deal with Brazilian label GR6, and formed deals with independent labels in Spain, Norway, Turkey, Japan, South Korea, Denmark, and Sweden in 2020.

Under a deal with parent company Universal Music Group, Ingrooves became the distributor for K-pop band BTS in 2021. Ingrooves signed India’s Yo Yo Honey Singh and Himesh Reshammiya in 2021. It acquired South African independent music distributor Electromode in 2021, and the Philippines’ Curve Entertainment in 2022.

In January 2022, Ingrooves acquired the Icelandic record label Alda Music, which owned the rights to nearly 80 percent of all music released in Iceland.

In September 2022, Universal Music Group announced the launch of Virgin Music Group which consists of Ingrooves, Virgin Music Label & Artist Services (formerly Caroline Distribution), and mtheory Artist Partnerships. On October 19, 2023, Virgin Music Group announced that Ingrooves was integrated with them.
