= Destiny's Child discography =

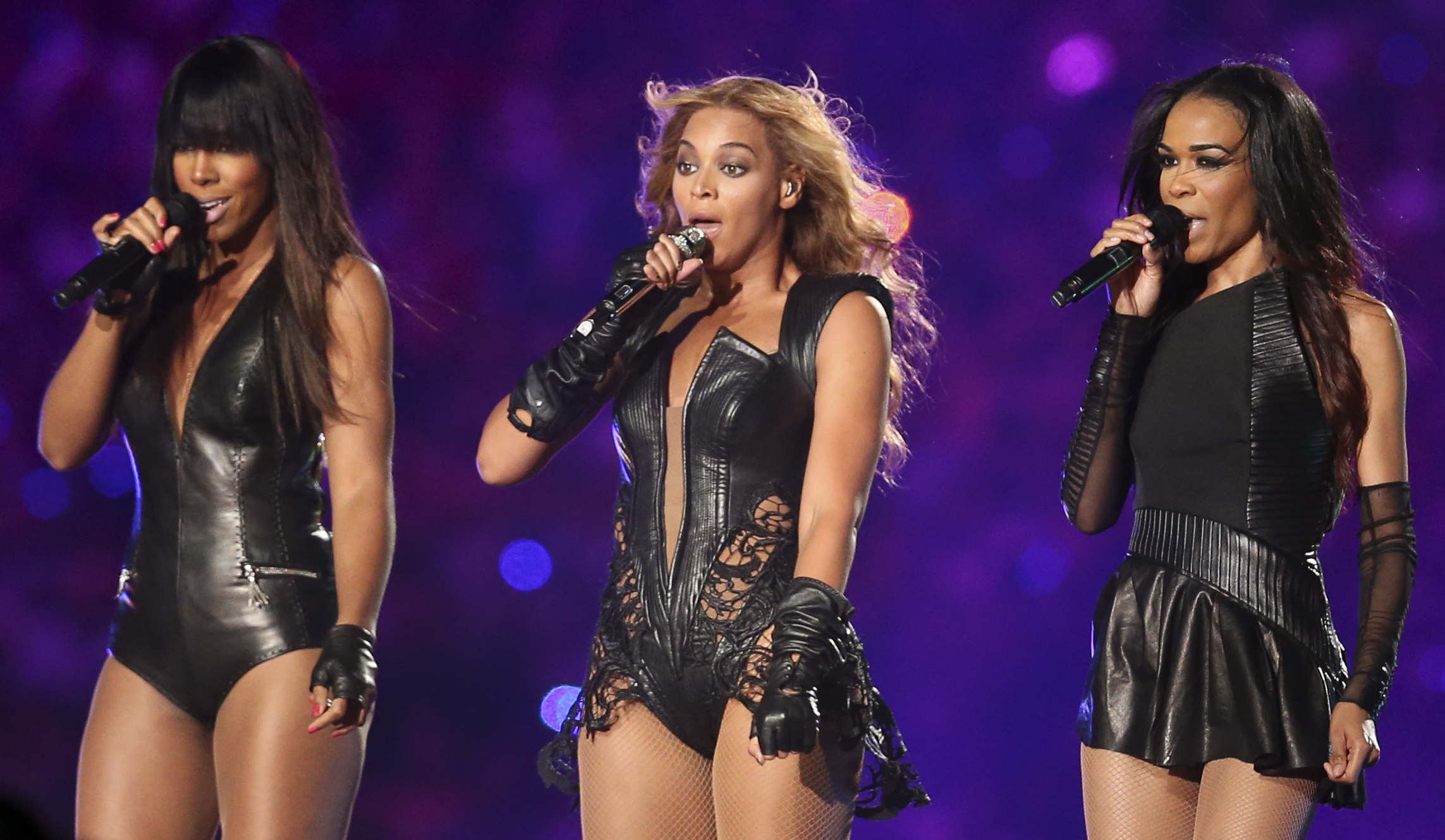
- Studio albums: 5
- Extended plays: 1
- Compilation albums: 5
- Remix albums: 2
- Singles: 24
- Promotional singles: 2
- Video albums: 4
- Music videos: 31

American R&B girl group Destiny's Child has released 5 studio albums, 1 extended play (EP), 5 compilation albums, 2 remix albums, 24 singles (including 6 as a featured artist), 2 promotional singles, 4 video albums, and 31 music videos (including 6 as a featured artist).

Destiny's Child first charted in November 1997, and released their self-titled debut album in the United States in February 1998 and it peaked at number 67 on the Billboard 200. It earned a platinum certification in the United States by the Recording Industry Association of America (RIAA). The album's lead single, "No, No, No", reached number three on the Billboard Hot 100 and was certified platinum by the RIAA. The group's second album, The Writing's on the Wall, was released in July 1999, and was their breakthrough release peaking at number 5 on the Billboard 200. The first and third singles, "Bills, Bills, Bills" and "Say My Name", peaked atop the US Billboard Hot 100. The album eventually sold over eight million copies in the United States, gaining eight-times platinum certification by the RIAA. Destiny's Child then released the theme song for Charlie's Angels. Titled "Independent Women Part I", it spent eleven consecutive weeks at number one on the Billboard Hot 100, becoming the longest running number one of that year.

The group's third album, Survivor, was released in the spring of 2001 and reached number one on Billboard 200. The title track reached number 2 in the US and follow-up single "Bootylicious" was their fourth number one song. In March 2002, a remix compilation titled This Is the Remix was released. After a three-year hiatus working on solo projects, the group reunited to record their fifth and final studio album, Destiny Fulfilled, released in November 2004. The album reached number two in the US and was certified three-time platinum. Four singles were released from the album: "Lose My Breath", "Soldier", "Girl", and "Cater 2 U". The first two singles reached number three in US. A final greatest hits album, #1's, was released in October 2005 following their split. To date, Destiny's Child has sold 17.5 million albums in the US and over 60 million records worldwide. Billboard magazine ranked the group as one of the greatest female acts of all time, and inducted the group in 2008 into the All-Time Hot 100 Artists.

== Albums ==
=== Studio albums ===
List of studio albums, with selected chart positions, sales, certifications and details
Title	Details	Peak chart positions										Sales	Certifications
Title	Details	US	AUS	CAN	FRA	GER	IRE	NLD	NZ	SWI	UK	Sales	Certifications
Destiny's Child	Released: February 17, 1998; Label: Columbia (#CK-67728); Formats: CD, MD, cassette	67	—	29	—	—	—	30	—	—	45	US: 847,000	RIAA: Platinum; BPI: Gold; MC: 2× Platinum
The Writing's on the Wall	Released: July 27, 1999; Label: Columbia; Formats: CD, MD, cassette	5	2	5	32	21	3	3	6	23	10	World: 13,000,000; US: 6,400,000; UK: 1,120,878	RIAA: 8× Platinum; ARIA: 3× Platinum; BPI: 3× Platinum; BVMI: Gold; IFPI SWI: Gold; MC: 5× Platinum; RMNZ: 3× Platinum (Note: "New Zealand Music Charts". Recorded Music NZ. Archived from the original on 2013-11-27. To retrieve New Zealand's albums/singles certifications, select the field Top 50 Albums Chart (for albums) and Top 50 Singles Chart (for singles) along with the following listed below: For album The Writing's on the Wall (3× Platinum), select: "Top 50 Album Chart: Chart #1241"; For album Survivor (Platinum), select: "Top 50 Albums Chart: Chart #1271"; For album Destiny Fulfilled (Gold), select: "Top 50 Albums Chart: Chart #1441"; For album #1's (Platinum), select: "Top 50 Albums Chart: Chart #1488"; For single "Jumpin', Jumpin'" (Gold), select: "Top 50 Singles Chart: Chart #1233"; For single "Soldier" (Gold), select: "Top 50 Singles Chart: Chart #1461"); SNEP: 2× Gold
Survivor	Released: April 24, 2001; Label: Columbia; Formats: CD, MD, cassette, Super Audio CD	1	4	1	4	1	1	1	5	1	1	World: 10,000,000; US: 4,300,000; UK: 1,130,983	RIAA: 4× Platinum; ARIA: 2× Platinum; BPI: 3× Platinum; BVMI: Platinum; IFPI SWI: Platinum; MC: 4× Platinum; RMNZ: 2× Platinum; SNEP: 2× Gold
8 Days of Christmas	Released: October 30, 2001; Label: Columbia; Formats: CD, MD, cassette	34	65	34	134	80	—	24	—	—	117	US: 571,000	RIAA: Platinum; MC: Gold
Destiny Fulfilled	Released: November 15, 2004; Label: Columbia; Formats: CD, digital download	2	11	3	9	3	5	4	21	3	5	World: 7,000,000; US: 3,100,000	RIAA: 3× Platinum; ARIA: Platinum; BPI: 2× Platinum; BVMI: Platinum; IFPI-SWI: Gold; MC: Platinum; RMNZ: Platinum
"—" denotes a recording that did not chart in that territory.

=== Compilation albums ===
List of compilation albums, with selected chart positions, certifications and details
Title	Details	Peak chart positions										Certifications
Title	Details	US	AUS	FRA	GER	IRE	JPN	NLD	NZ	SWI	UK	Certifications
#1's	Released: October 25, 2005; Label: Columbia; Formats: CD, digital download	1	10	189	27	8	1	31	3	8	6	RIAA: Platinum; ARIA: Platinum; BPI: 2× Platinum; IRMA: 2× Platinum; RIAJ: 2× Platinum; RMNZ: 2× Platinum
Mathew Knowles & Music World Present Vol.1: Love Destiny	Released: June 25, 2008; Label: Columbia; Formats: CD	—	—	—	—	—	18	—	—	—	—	
Playlist: The Very Best of Destiny's Child	Released: October 9, 2012; Label: Columbia; Formats: CD, digital download	77	—	—	—	—	—	—	—	—	—	
Love Songs	Released: January 29, 2013; Label: Columbia; Formats: CD, digital download	72	69	149	—	27	84	—	—	89	44	
Destiny's Child: The Untold Story Presents Girls Tyme	Released: December 2, 2019; Label: Trinitee Urban; Formats: digital download	—	—	—	—	—	—	—	—	—	—	
"—" denotes a recording that did not chart in that territory.

=== Remix albums ===
List of remix albums, with selected chart positions, sales, certifications and details
Title	Details	Peak chart positions										Sales	Certifications
Title	Details	US	AUS	CAN	FRA	GER	IRE	NLD	NZ	SWI	UK	Sales	Certifications
Single Remix Tracks	Released: November 1, 2000; Label: Sony Music Japan; Formats: CD, Cassette	—	—	—	—	—	—	—	—	—	—		
This Is the Remix	Released: March 12, 2002; Label: Columbia; Formats: CD, cassette	29	43	51	54	43	59	27	8	43	25	US: 249,000	BPI: Gold; RMNZ: Gold
"—" denotes a recording that did not chart in that territory.

== Extended plays ==
List of extended plays with selected details
Title	EP details	Notes
Love: Destiny	Released: August 31, 2001; Label: Columbia; Formats: CD, Cassette	Released exclusively by Target.; Features a previously unreleased track and remixes from the albums The Writing's on the Wall and Survivor.

== Singles ==
=== As lead artist ===
List of singles as lead artist, with selected chart positions, sales and certifications, showing release year and originating album
Title	Year	Peak chart positions										Sales	Certifications	Album
Title	Year	US	AUS	CAN	FRA	GER	IRE	NLD	NZ	SWI	UK	Sales	Certifications	Album
"No, No, No"	1997	3	72	7	88	17	—	3	16	13	5	US: 1,300,000	RIAA: Platinum; BPI: Silver	Destiny's Child
"With Me" (featuring Jermaine Dupri)	1998	—	—	—	—	—	—	87	—	—	19			Destiny's Child
"Get on the Bus" (featuring Timbaland)	1998	—	—	—	—	60	—	15	—	—	15			Why Do Fools Fall in Love Soundtrack and The Writing's on the Wall
"Bills, Bills, Bills"	1999	1	26	7	20	19	17	8	12	28	6		RIAA: Platinum; BPI: Platinum; RMNZ: Platinum	The Writing's on the Wall
"Bug a Boo"	1999	33	26	—	57	20	—	4	—	60	9		BPI: Silver	The Writing's on the Wall
"Say My Name"	2000	1	1	4	10	14	15	4	4	20	3	UK: 2,122,942	RIAA: 3× Platinum; ARIA: 2× Platinum; BPI: 3× Platinum; RMNZ: 5× Platinum; SNEP: Gold	The Writing's on the Wall
"Jumpin' Jumpin'"	2000	3	2	8	41	31	18	5	6	44	5		RIAA: Platinum; ARIA: Platinum; BPI: Platinum; RMNZ: Platinum; SNEP: Gold	The Writing's on the Wall
"Independent Women Part I"	2000	1	3	3	19	10	2	2	1	2	1		RIAA: Platinum; ARIA: 2× Platinum; BPI: Platinum; BVMI: Gold; IFPI-SWI: Gold; NVPI: Gold; RMNZ: Platinum; SNEP: Gold	Charlie's Angels: Music from the Motion Picture and Survivor
"Survivor"	2001	2	7	2	12	8	1	2	3	5	1		RIAA: Platinum; ARIA: Platinum; BPI: 2× Platinum; BVMI: Gold; RMNZ: Platinum	Survivor
"Bootylicious"	2001	1	4	4	14	16	5	3	4	11	2	UK: 646,000	RIAA: Platinum; ARIA: Platinum; BPI: Platinum; RMNZ: Platinum	Survivor
"Emotion"	2001	10	17	11	61	21	9	7	2	21	3		ARIA: Gold; BPI: Silver; RMNZ: Gold	Survivor
"8 Days of Christmas"	2001	—	68	—	—	—	87	—	—	—	185	—	ARIA: Gold; BPI: Gold; RMNZ: Gold	8 Days of Christmas
"Nasty Girl"	2002	—	10	—	—	36	34	23	46	22	—		ARIA: Gold	Survivor
"Lose My Breath"	2004	3	3	—	8	3	1	4	4	1	2		RIAA: Platinum; ARIA: Platinum; BPI: Platinum; BVMI: Gold; IFPI-SWI: Gold; RMNZ: Platinum; SNEP: Gold	Destiny Fulfilled
"Soldier" (featuring T.I. and Lil Wayne)	2004	3	3	—	28	11	6	10	4	10	4		RIAA: Platinum; ARIA: Gold; BPI: Gold; RMNZ: Platinum	Destiny Fulfilled
"Girl"	2005	23	5	—	—	38	8	11	6	26	6		RIAA: Gold; ARIA: Gold; BPI: Silver; RMNZ: Platinum	Destiny Fulfilled
"Cater 2 U"	2005	14	15	—	—	—	—	60	7	—	—		RIAA: Platinum; BPI: Silver; RMNZ: 2× Platinum	Destiny Fulfilled
"Stand Up for Love"	2005	—	—	—	—	—	—	—	—	—	—			#1's
"—" denotes a recording that did not chart in that territory.

=== As featured artist ===
List of singles as featured artist, with selected chart positions and certifications, showing release year and originating album
Title	Year	Peak chart positions						Certifications	Album
Title	Year	US	US R&B /HH	US Dance	AUS	IRE	UK	Certifications	Album
"Can't Stop" (Lil' O featuring Destiny's Child)	1997	—	87	—	—	—	—		Blood Money
"Just Be Straight with Me" (Silkk the Shocker featuring Master P, Destiny's Child, O'Dell and Mo B. Dick)	1998	57	36	—	—	—	—		Charge It 2 da Game
"She's Gone" (Matthew Marsden featuring Destiny's Child)	1998	—	—	—	—	—	24		Say Who
"Thug Love" (50 Cent featuring Destiny's Child)	1999	—	—	—	—	—	—		Power of the Dollar
"What's Going On" (with various artists)	2001	27	76	—	38	8	6		Non-album single
"The Girl Is Mine" (99 Souls featuring Destiny's Child and Brandy)	2015	—	—	1	33	8	5	ARIA: Gold; BPI: 2× Platinum	Non-album single
"—" denotes a recording that did not chart in that territory.

=== Promotional singles ===
List of promotional singles, with selected chart positions and certifications, showing release year and originating album
Title	Year	Peak chart positions							Certifications	Album
Title	Year	US Bub.	US R&B /HH	AUS	IRE	NLD	UK	UK R&B	Certifications	Album
"Rudolph the Red-Nosed Reindeer"	2004	—	—	—	—	—	—	—		8 Days of Christmas
"Got's My Own"	2005	—	—	—	—	—	—	—		Destiny Fulfilled
"—" denotes a recording that did not chart in that territory.

== Other charted and certified songs ==
List of other charted and certified songs, with selected chart positions, sales and certifications, showing release year and originating album
Title	Year	Peak chart positions			Sales	Certifications	Album
Title	Year	US R&B /HH	JPN	KOR Int.	Sales	Certifications	Album
"So Good"	1999	103	—	—			The Writing's on the Wall
"Brown Eyes"	2001	—	—	—		RMNZ: Gold	Survivor
"Nuclear"	2013	—	21	25	KOR: 18,700		Love Songs
"Say My Name" (Timbaland remix featuring Static)	2023	—	—	—		BVMI: Gold	This Is the Remix
"—" denotes a recording that did not chart in that territory.

== Soundtrack & other appearances ==
Title	Year	Album
"Killing Time"	1997	Men in Black
"Get on the Bus" (with Timbaland)	1998	Why Do Fools Fall in Love
"Once a Fool" (with William Floyd)	1998	NFL Jams '98
"Stimulate Me" (with Mocha)	1999	Life
"No More Rainy Days"	1999	The PJs
"Woman in Me" (Jessica Simpson featuring Destiny's Child)	1999	Sweet Kisses
"Perfect Man"	2000	Romeo Must Die
"Good to Me" (Mary Mary featuring Destiny's Child)	2000	Thankful / Go Get It
"Big Momma's Theme" (with Da Brat & Vita)	2000	Big Momma's House
"Do It Again" (Cam'ron featuring Destiny's Child)	2000	S.D.E
"Independent Women Part I"	2000	Charlie's Angels
"Dot"	2000	Charlie's Angels
"Survivor" (Extended Remix featuring Da Brat)	2001	MTV's Hip Hopera: Carmen
"Bootylicious" (Rockwilder Remix featuring Missy Elliott)	2001	MTV's Hip Hopera: Carmen
"Happy Face"	2002	The Master of Disguise
"I Know"	2003	The Fighting Temptations
"The Proud Family Theme Song" (with Solange)	2004	The Proud Family Soundtrack
"Bills, Bills, Bills"	2019	What Men Want
"Baby Baby Baby" (with Kobe Bryant)	2021	Visions LP
"Bootylicious"	2022	Turning Red

== Videography ==
=== Video singles ===
Title	Year	Peak chart positions	Certification
Title	Year	US Music Videos	Certification
"Survivor"	2001	9	RIAA: Gold

=== Video albums ===
Title	Year	Peak chart positions					Certification
Title	Year	US Music Videos	AUS Music Videos	JPN DVD	NLD Music DVD	UK Music Videos	Certification
The Platinum's on the Wall	2001	17	11	—	—	7	RIAA: Gold
Destiny's Child World Tour	2003	3	16	—	5	3	ARIA: Platinum; BPI: Gold; SNEP: Gold
Live in Atlanta	2006	1	11	7	4	6	RIAA: Platinum
Destiny's Child Video Anthology	2013	12	—	—	—	—	
"—" denotes a recording that did not chart in that territory.

=== Music videos ===
==== As lead artist ====
Title	Year	Director
"No, No, No" [Part I]	1997	Darren Grant
"No, No, No" [Part II] (featuring Wyclef Jean)	1997	Darren Grant
"With Me" [Part I] (featuring Jermaine Dupri)	1998	Darren Grant
"Get on the Bus" (featuring Timbaland)	1998	Earle Sebastian
"Bills, Bills, Bills"	1999	Darren Grant
"Bug a Boo"	1999	Darren Grant
"Bug a Boo" [Refugee Camp Remix] (featuring Wyclef Jean)	1999	Darren Grant
"Say My Name"	2000	Joseph Kahn
"Jumpin' Jumpin'"	2000	Joseph Kahn
"Jumpin', Jumpin'" [So So Def Remix] (featuring Jermaine Dupri, Da Brat & Lil Bow Wow)	2000	Joseph Kahn
"Independent Women Part I"	2000	Francis Lawrence
"Survivor"	2001	Darren Grant
"Survivor" [Remix] (featuring Da Brat)	2001	Darren Grant
"Bootylicious"	2001	Matthew Rolston
"Bootylicious" [Rockwilder Remix] (featuring Missy Elliott)	2001	Little X
"Emotion"	2001	Francis Lawrence
"8 Days of Christmas"	2001	Sanaa Hamri
"Nasty Girl"	2002	Sanaa Hamri
"Lose My Breath"	2004	Marc Klasfeld (as Alan Smithee)
"Lose My Breath" [Alternative Version]	2004	Marc Klasfeld (as Alan Smithee)
"Soldier" (featuring T.I. & Lil Wayne)	2004	Ray Kay
"Rudolph the Red-Nosed Reindeer"	2004	Jesse Rosensweet
"Girl"	2005	Bryan Barber
"Cater 2 U"	2005	Jake Nava
"Stand Up for Love" (2005 World Children's Day Anthem)	2005	Matthew Rolston

==== As featured artist ====
Title	Year	Artist	Director
"Can't Stop" (featuring Destiny's Child)	1997	Lil' O	Dwayne 'DC' Coles
"Just Be Straight with Me" (featuring Master P, Destiny's Child, O'Dell and Mo B. Dick)	1998	Silkk the Shocker	
"She's Gone" (featuring Destiny's Child)	1998	Matthew Marsden	Tim Royes
"What's Going On" [Dupri Original Mix]	2001	All Star Tribute	Malik Hassan Sayeed and Jake Scott
"What's Going On" [Mick Guzauski's Pop Mix]	2001	All Star Tribute	Malik Hassan Sayeed and Jake Scott
"What's Going On" [Dupri R&B Mix]	2001	All Star Tribute	Malik Hassan Sayeed and Jake Scott

==== As featured performer ====
Title	Year	Artist	Director
"I Gotta Be" [Alternative Version]	1998	Jagged Edge	Chris Robinson
"You Owe Me"	2000	Nas	Dave Meyers
"Izzo (H.O.V.A.)"	2001	Jay-Z	Dave Meyers

== See also ==
- List of Destiny's Child songs
- Beyoncé discography
- Kelly Rowland discography
- Michelle Williams discography
- LeToya Luckett discography
