= Love Destiny =

Love Destiny may refer to:

== Film and television ==
- Love Destiny (2018 TV series), a Thai TV series
- Love Destiny: The Movie, a 2022 Thai historical comedy film, a spin-off of the 2018 series
- Love Destiny (2026 TV series), a Thai TV series, a remake of the 2018 series
- Love Destiny (Chinese TV series), 2013

== Music ==
- "Love Destiny" (song), 2001, by Yui Horie
- "Love (Destiny)", a 1999 song by J-pop singer Ayumi Hamasaki
- Love: Destiny, a 2001 EP by the group Destiny's Child
- Mathew Knowles & Music World Present Vol.1: Love Destiny, a 2008 compilation album by Destiny's Child

== See also ==
- Love and Destiny (Chinese: 宸汐缘; pinyin: Chen Xi Yuan), a 2019 Chinese television series
