= Playlist: The Very Best of Destiny's Child =

Compilation album by Destiny's Child
- Released: October 9, 2012
- Recorded: 1997–2004
- Genre: R&B
- Length: 52:23
- Labels: Columbia; Sony Music; Legacy
- Producers: Mathew Knowles; Beyoncé Knowles; Kelly Rowland; Michelle Williams

Destiny's Child chronology
Mathew Knowles & Music World Present Vol.1: Love Destiny (2008)	Playlist: The Very Best of Destiny's Child (2012)	Love Songs (2013)

Playlist: The Very Best of Destiny's Child is the third compilation album by American R&B girl group Destiny's Child. It was released on October 9, 2012, through Columbia Records matching with the fifteenth anniversary of Destiny's Child's formation. The compilation contained fourteen songs from the group's repertoire consisting of four studio albums.

Upon its release, the album received positive reviews from critics who praised its track list featuring the band's most popular songs; however some of them noted the lack of new material as a downside. It peaked at numbers 77 and 17 on the Billboard 200 and the magazine's Top R&B/Hip-Hop Albums chart respectively, becoming the highest ranking release of the playlist album series through Legacy Recordings.

== Background and release ==
On July 7, 2012, Mathew Knowles, the music manager of the group, revealed that Destiny's Child would reunite after a seven-year-long hiatus saying, "We still have our joint venture with Sony, and in November, we're putting out two Destiny's Child catalog records with new material". During the interview, he also mentioned plans for a possible tour. Later it was confirmed through a press release by Music World Entertainment, Columbia Records and Legacy Recordings on September 19, 2012, that the album would be a greatest hits compilation album titled Playlist: The Very Best of Destiny's Child and it would be released on October 9, 2012, to mark the group's fifteenth anniversary since its formation.

The album contains fourteen songs from Destiny's Child's four studio albums: Destiny's Child (1998), The Writing's on the Wall (1999), Survivor (2001) and Destiny Fulfilled (2004). Group members Beyoncé, Kelly Rowland and Michelle Williams served as the producers for Playlist: The Very Best of Destiny's Child along with Mathew Knowles.

== Critical reception ==
Professional ratings
Review scores
Source	Rating
AllMusic	4.5/5 stars

Stephen Thomas Erlewine of the website AllMusic praised Playlist: The Very Best of Destiny's Child along with their other greatest hits compilation #1's for being "excellent overviews of the biggest and best female R&B group of their time". He further noted similarities in their content as they shared twelve same songs on their respective track listings. James Robertson of Daily Mirror magazine described the album as "amazing" and added that "unlike other albums that recycle good songs to ship some of their rubbish new material it's actually awesome". Consequence of Sound writer Jeremy D. Larson described the compilation as "hit-heavy". Chris Martins of Spin felt that the album "sans any big surprises" due to lack of newly recorded material by the group. Gerrick D. Kennedy writing for the Los Angeles Times felt that "sadly, [the album] won't feature any goodies that a fan of the sassy pop-R&B group didn't already own" further noting that it covered "largely the same ground" as #1's.

== Commercial performance ==
On the Billboard 200 albums chart in the United States, Playlist: The Very Best of Destiny's Child debuted and peaked at number 77 on the chart issue dated December 8, 2012. The album also spent an additional week on the chart. The album performed better on the Top R&B/Hip-Hop Albums where it peaked at number 17 and charted for a total of nine weeks. In November 2012, Billboard magazine revealed that Playlist – The Very Best of Destiny's Child was the highest ranking album in Legacy Recording's Playlist series. Following Destiny's Child reunion performance at the Super Bowl XLVII halftime show on February 3, 2013, the compilation climbed to number 66 on the iTunes Albums chart.

== Track listing ==
No.	Title	Writer(s)	Album	Length
1.	"Bootylicious"	Rob Fusari; Beyoncé Knowles; Falonte Moore; Stevie Nicks; Kelendria Rowland	Survivor	3:27
2.	"Bug a Boo"	Kevin Briggs; Kandi Burruss; Beyoncé Knowles; LeToya Luckett; LaTavia Roberson; Rowland	The Writing's on the Wall	3:22
3.	"Emotion" (The Neptunes Remix)	Barry Gibb; Robin Gibb	This Is the Remix	4:14
4.	"Jumpin', Jumpin'"	Rufus Moore; Chad Elliott; Beyoncé Knowles	The Writing's on the Wall	3:48
5.	"Independent Women" (Part 1)	Beyoncé Knowles; Cory Rooney; Samuel Barnes; Jean-Claude Olivier	Survivor	3:35
6.	"Say My Name"	Rodney Jerkins; Fred Jerkins III; LaShawn Daniels; Beyoncé Knowles; Luckett; Rowland; Roberson	The Writing's on the Wall	4:00
7.	"No, No, No" (Part 2) (featuring Wyclef Jean)	Vincent Herbert; Fusari; Mary Brown; Calvin Gaines	Destiny's Child	3:28
8.	"Survivor"	Beyoncé Knowles; Anthony Dent; Mathew Knowles	Survivor	3:49
9.	"Lose My Breath"	Beyoncé Knowles; Rowland; Michelle Williams; Rodney Jerkins; Fred Jerkins III; Sean Garrett; Daniels; Shawn Carter	Destiny Fulfilled	4:02
10.	"So Good"	Briggs; Burruss; Beyoncé Knowles; Luckett; Roberson; Rowland	The Writing's on the Wall	3:13
11.	"Girl"	Beyoncé Knowles; Rowland; Williams; Patrick Douthit; Garrett; Angela Beyince; Don Davis; Eddie Robinson	Destiny Fulfilled	3:44
12.	"Bills, Bills, Bills"	Briggs; Burruss; Beyoncé Knowles; Luckett; Roberson; Rowland	The Writing's on the Wall	3:44
13.	"Soldier" (featuring T.I. and Lil Wayne)	Beyoncé Knowles; Rowland; Williams; Rich Harrison; Garrett; Dwayne Carter; Clifford Harris	Destiny Fulfilled	4:05
14.	"Illusion" (featuring Wyclef Jean & Pras of Refugee Camp)	Isaac Hayes; Tony Swan; Steve Jolley; Ashely Ingram; Leslie John	Destiny's Child	3:52

== Credits and personnel ==
Credits for Playlist: The Very Best of Destiny's Child are adapted from the album's liner notes and the website AllMusic.

- 9th Wonder – producer
- Jovonn Alexander – producer
- Tim Anderson – project director
- Vic Anesini – mastering
- S. Barnes – composer
- Angela Beyince – composer
- K. Briggs – composer
- Kevin "She'kspere" Briggs – composer, producer, vocal producer
- Rob Carter – art direction, design
- LaShawn Daniels – composer, vocal producer
- Anthony Dent – composer, producer
- Destiny's Child – primary artist
- Patrick Douthit – composer
- Jerry "Te Bass" Duplesis – producer
- Chad "Dr. Cuess" Elliott – composer, producer
- Fabrizio Ferri – photography
- Rob Fusari – composer, producer
- Calvin Gaines – composer
- Sean Garrett – composer, vocal producer
- Barry Gibb – composer
- Robin Gibb – composer
- Che Greene – producer
- Clifford Harris – composer
- Rich Harrison – composer, producer
- V. Herbert – composer
- Wyclef Jean – featured artist, producer
- Fred "Uncle Freddie" Jerkins III – composer
- Rodney "Darkchild" Jerkins – composer, producer
- Maura K. Johnston – liner notes
- S. Jolley – composer
- Kandi – composer, vocal producer
- Beyoncé Knowles – compilation producer, composer, producer, vocal producer
- Mathew Knowles – compilation producer, composer
- Lil Wayne – featured artist
- LeToya Luckett – composer
- Falonte Moore – composer, producer
- The Neptunes – producer
- Stevie Nicks – composer
- J.C. Olivier – composer
- Poke & Tone – producer
- Pras – Featured Artist, producer
- Byron Rittenhouse – vocals
- LaTavia Roberson – composer
- E. Robinson – composer
- Cory Rooney – composer, producer
- Kelly Rowland – compilation producer, composer
- Rod Spicer – photography
- T.I. – featured artist
- Henry Towns – A&R
- Michelle Williams – compilation producer, composer

== Charts ==
=== Weekly charts ===
Chart (2012)	Peak position
US Billboard 200	77
US Top R&B/Hip-Hop Albums (Billboard)	14

=== Year-end charts ===
Chart (2013)	Position
US Top R&B/Hip-Hop Albums (Billboard)	83

== Release history ==
Country	Date	Format	Label	Ref.
Australia	October 9, 2012	Digital download; CD	Sony Music	
United States	October 9, 2012	Digital download; CD	Columbia; Legacy	

== See also ==
- Playlist (album series)
- Destiny's Child discography
