= Video Anthology (video) =

Video by Destiny's Child
- Released: May 31, 2013
- Recorded: 1997–2005
- Genre: R&B
- Length: 59:12
- Labels: Music World; Columbia; Legacy
- Directors: Darren Grant; Joseph Kahn; Francis Lawrence; Matthew Rolston; Director X; Alan Smithee; Ray Kay; Bryan Barber; Jake Nava
- Producers: Akil Brown; Beyoncé Knowles (exec.); Kelly Rowland (exec.); Michelle Williams (exec.); Mathew Knowles (exec.)

Destiny's Child chronology
Love Songs (2013)	Video Anthology (2013)	Destiny's Child: The Untold Story Presents Girls Tyme (2019)

Video Anthology is the fourth video album by American recording group Destiny's Child. It is a sixteen-music video collection, filmed by the group with various directors during their music career (1997–2005). The album was produced by Akil Brown with members Beyoncé, Kelly Rowland and Michelle Williams and their manager Mathew Knowles also serving as executive producers. To promote the album, Destiny's Child collaborated with several publications which offered copies to their readers through their websites. The album was first released on May 31, 2013 through Columbia Records. Upon its release, it received positive reviews from music critics who praised the visuals included complete with the accompanying choreography. However, one writer felt the album was incomplete and argued that many videos were omitted from the track listing.

== Background and release ==
The album was announced via a press release on Destiny's Child's website on April 16, 2013. It was released through Music World Entertainment, Columbia Records, and Legacy Recordings, and was the group's third record release with the latter. Video Anthology contained sixteen music videos for fourteen songs filmed throughout the band's music career. (Note: Two music videos for the song "Bootylicious" are placed on the album – the first one is the clip containing the original album version while the second is a video filmed for the remix featuring American rapper Missy Elliott. Similarly, two videos for "No, No, No" are included dubbed as Part I and Part II containing the original album version of the song and a remix featuring Haitian hip hop artist Wyclef Jean.) It was produced by Akil Brown with members Beyoncé, Kelly Rowland and Michelle Williams as well as their manager Mathew Knowles serving as executive producers. All the featured videos are presented in an aspect ratio – 1.33:1.

The cover artwork used for the release of the DVD is taken from the music video of "Cater 2 U" (2005) directed by Jake Nava and it features the members of Destiny's Child dressed in long form-fitting blue fishtail evening dresses; it was shot at Red Rock Canyon State Park in California by photographer Daniel Moss. For the release, Destiny's Child partnered with the website TheDrop.fm on May 21, 2013 which offered a prize pack to its readers featuring the album, two T-shirts and the group's tourbook. Jet magazine also organized a contest on its official website offering to give away five copies of the DVD. A similar contest was organized on Juicy magazine's official website, offering five copies from the album to five of its readers. To further promote the album, the group was featured on the R&B division of the Vevo channel at YouTube on June 4, 2013. Video Anthology was first released in the UK and Germany on May 31, 2013. It was later released in the US on June 4 and on the country's iTunes Store two days later, while the following day it was released in Australia. In Japan, Video Anthology was released on June 26, 2013.

== Reception ==
Gregory Heaney from the website AllMusic positively reviewed the video album, writing, "[it] combines the group's considerable vocal talents with their amazing choreography, delivering the total Destiny's Child package as a video greatest-hits compilation". Jacob Rohn from the website Black Entertainment Television (BET) felt that "While each later became a star in their own right, Destiny's Child as a group was known for their edgy and visually magnetic videos". He further finished his review by writing, "Destiny's Child's Video Anthology is a must-have for any DC fan and anyone that misses the time when music videos were at their peak." A writer of ABC News Radio similarly noted that the album was created for "fans who studied all their moves" and remember the choreography. Tanner Stransky of Entertainment Weekly felt the album was the most "indulgent" memory trip to the period of the late-1990s and early-2000s memory lane. He further described the videos as "gaudy, stupid fun". However, a more mixed review came from The Morton Report writer Chaz Lipp who felt that the album was incomplete and noted that eight other videos from the group's videography were not released. (Note: In his review for The Morton Report, Chaz Lipp remarked that the following music videos by Destiny's Child were not included in the album: "With Me" (1998), "Get on the Bus" (1998), Refugee Camp Remix of "Bug a Boo" (1999), So So Def Remix of "Jumpin', Jumpin'" (2000), "8 Days of Christmas" (2001), "Rudolph the Red-Nosed Reindeer (2001), "Nasty Girl" (2002).) He remarked that the unreleased videos for the songs, most notably the ones from the holiday album 8 Days of Christmas could have been included as bonus selections. Lipp concluded that Video Anthology "hits its peak with the group's best single, the irresistibly funky 'Bootylicious'".

== Track listing ==
No.	Title	Director(s)	Length
1.	"No, No, No" (Part I)	Darren Grant	4:30
2.	"No, No, No" (Part II) (featuring Wyclef Jean)	Grant	3:27
3.	"Bills, Bills, Bills"	Grant	4:04
4.	"Bug a Boo"	Grant	3:14
5.	"Say My Name"	Joseph Kahn	3:59
6.	"Jumpin', Jumpin'"	Kahn	3:26
7.	"Survivor"	Grant	4:09
8.	"Independent Women Part I"	Francis Lawrence	3:57
9.	"Bootylicious"	Matthew Rolston	3:29
10.	"Bootylicious" (Remix) (featuring Missy Elliott)	Little X	4:17
11.	"Emotion"	Lawrence	3:56
12.	"Lose My Breath"	Alan Smithee	3:38
13.	"Soldier" (featuring T.I. & Lil Wayne)	Ray Kay	4:04
14.	"Girl"	Bryan Barber	3:52
15.	"Stand Up for Love" (2005 World Children's Day Anthem)	Rolston	4:26
16.	"Cater 2 U"	Jake Nava	4:10
Total length:			59:12

== Credits and personnel ==
Credits are adapted from the album's liner notes.

- A&R – Henry Towns
- Art direction, design – Rob Carter
- Project direction – Tara Master
- Executive producer – Beyoncé Knowles, Kelly Rowland, Michelle Williams, Mathew Knowles
- Authoring – Mike Nack
- Front cover photography – Daniel Moss
- Record producer – Akil Brown
- Product manager – Tim Anderson
- Featured artists – Wyclef Jean, Missy Elliott, T.I., Lil Wayne
