= Destiny's Child: The Untold Story Presents Girls Tyme =

Compilation album by Destiny's Child
- Released: December 2, 2019
- Genres: New jack swing, R&B, teen pop
- Length: 52:00
- Label: Trinitee Urban

Destiny's Child chronology
Destiny's Child Video Anthology (2013)	Destiny's Child: The Untold Story Presents Girls Tyme (2019)

Alternative cover
- Alternate cover used since 2020 on streaming services.

Destiny's Child: The Untold Story Presents Girls Tyme is a compilation album of songs by American R&B girl group Destiny's Child, then called Girls Tyme, released on December 2, 2019 through Trinitee Urban Records. The album features music recorded by Destiny's Child members during the early development of their career as a children's group.

== Background ==
On October 25, 2019, Destiny's Child's former manager Mathew Knowles announced via an Instagram video that he would release an album featuring then-unreleased music from the group's childhood days as Girls Tyme. Mathew Knowles connected with Leon Derrick Youngblood Sr in San Diego who helped arrange all the participants for the Girls Tyme project. The video ended with the intertitle “Destiny's Child: The Untold Story. Girls Tyme. December 2019."

The album was released on all streaming platforms and the iTunes Store on December 2, 2019. The album's release was also accompanied by a book, Destiny's Child: The Untold Story, written by Matthew Knowles and Star Jackson. On June 18, 2020, the audiobook was released on Audible, and is narrated by Mathew Knowles, Leon Derrick Youngblood Sr and Jackie Burgess.

== Track listing ==
No.	Title	Length
1.	"God Bless the Child (Intro)"	1:25
2.	"I Wanna Be Where You Are"	4:03
3.	"Sunshine"	4:51
4.	"Say It Ain't So"	3:53
5.	"Boy I Want You"	3:40
6.	"Girls Tyme Fun"	4:07
7.	"632-5792"	4:28
8.	"Boyfriend"	4:19
9.	"Teacher Fried My Brain"	4:15
10.	"When I Laid My Eyes on You"	3:05
11.	"In My City"	4:07
12.	"Hip House"	3:27
13.	"Blue Velvet"	3:52
14.	"Take Em 2 Another Level"	3:30
15.	"Talking 'Bout My Baby"	3:25
Total length:		52:00
