= Love Songs (Destiny's Child album) =

Compilation album by Destiny's Child
- Released: January 25, 2013
- Recorded: 1997–2012
- Genre: R&B
- Length: 63:31
- Label: Columbia

Destiny's Child chronology
Playlist: The Very Best of Destiny's Child (2012)	Love Songs (2013)	Destiny's Child Video Anthology (2013)

Love Songs is the third compilation album by American R&B girl group Destiny's Child, released on January 25, 2013 through Columbia Records. The album differs from their first two compilations in that it features mostly album-only selections as well as the newly recorded song "Nuclear", the first original song from Destiny's Child since the group disbanded in 2005. The album cover is based on the single artwork from the group's 2004 single "Lose My Breath".

== Development ==
Sometimes you get songs where the verse is already written or the chorus is already written, so when I came in the chorus wasn't written so Bey was like "Girl, you gone have to write a bridge!" I was like "Okay!", so that's fun where you can have a contribution...

— Michelle Williams talking to MalcolmMusic about the conception of "Nuclear"

Destiny's Child was formed in Houston, Texas in 1990, and its final line-up consisting of Beyoncé Knowles, Kelly Rowland and Michelle Williams dismantled in 2005. Their reunion was rumored over the years. In July 2012, Mathew Knowles, Beyoncé's father and the group's manager, confirmed that Destiny's Child still have their joint venture with Sony Music and would be releasing two "records with new material". The first was Playlist: The Very Best of Destiny's Child, which was released in October 2012. Knowles announced via her official website on January 10, 2013, that a compilation featuring new music entitled Love Songs, which would be the group's first album in over eight years, would be released. She posted its official artwork, "I am so proud to announce the first original Destiny's Child music in eight years." It contains one new song entitled "Nuclear", which was produced by Pharrell Williams.

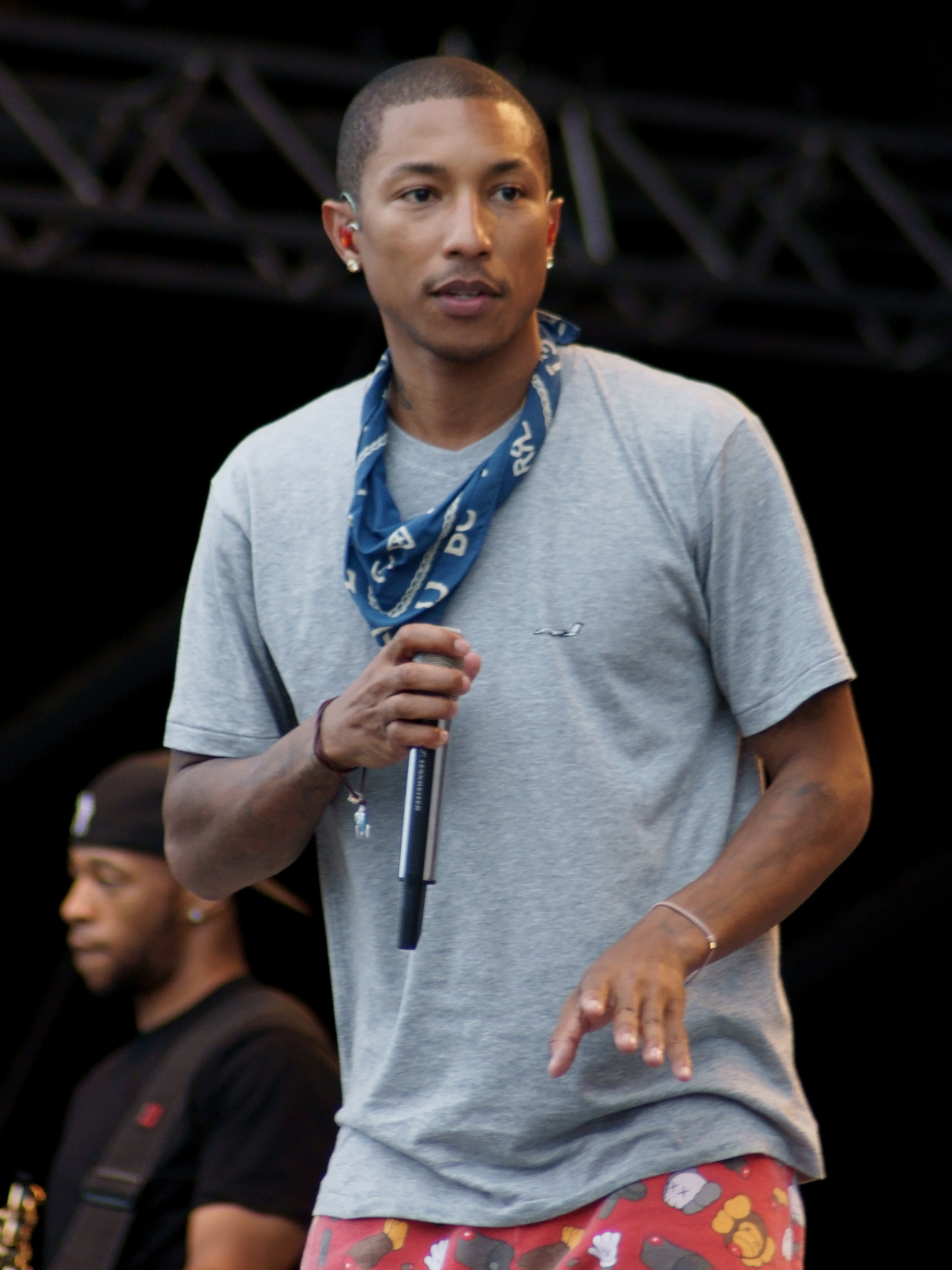
Pharrell Williams (pictured) produced "Nuclear"

Apart from "Nuclear", the rest of the album consists of assorted previously recorded music, which Knowles, Rowland and Williams handpicked. Williams said that Love Songs was made "for the fans", and told MTV News about recording the "Nuclear" track, "It was a bunch of fun. It was just picking up right where we left off. The harmonies and just us stacking [vocals] ... Beyoncé laid hers first, then I'd go and lay another note to the bottom, and I'm like, 'Wow, this is dope.' I literally got goose bumps." In an interview with German web show MalcolmMusic, commenting her contribution to the song as a songwriter, Michelle Williams revealed that Pharrell had already written the verses for Rowland and Knowles, and that Knowles urged Michelle to write her own bridge.

== Critical response ==
Professional ratings
Review scores
Source	Rating
Allmusic	3.5/5 stars
Consequence of Sound	2.5/5 stars
New York Daily News	3/5 stars

Upon its release, the public reaction to "Nuclear" was mixed. According to MTV News, "Those saying "no, no, no" called it too mid-tempo, underwhelming even, for an act that built its catalog on power anthems like "Survivor." But supporters fell hard for the drum-heavy Pharrell production." Consequence of Sound's Amanda Koellner gave Love Songs a mixed review, noting that its material highlights "the group’s knack for harmony and emotion" and it is "a shot of nostalgia", but isn't an "essential collection". Sarah Rodman of The Boston Globe was displeased with the lack of new material, calling the album "unnecessary" in the "digital world of playlist-making". Although, Rodman did praise "Nuclear" as a "modestly appealing trifle that features quasi-scientific nonsense about 'when two become one on a quantum level' and benefits from all the slow jam somnambulance preceding it by being slightly more alert."

Jim Farber of the New York Daily News said the album's ballads which "didn't flatter Destiny's core persona" sounded like "extended runs rather than fully honed tunes." Farber, who had given the album an overall score of three out of five stars, went on to praise their "rich" vocal performances, writing "the way the voices of Kelly Rowland and Michelle Williams wrap around Beyoncé’s — encouraging ever higher flights, while jazzing up each other’s runs — proves this wasn’t just a one-woman show".

Andy Kellman of Allmusic described the collection as "a sharp selection of deep album cuts, including one from Kelly Rowland's Simply Deep ("Heaven"), that demonstrates the group's depth behind the hits". Kellman gave particular praise to "Nuclear", calling it a "knockout" and writing, "it sounds more like something released in 1990 by the Chimes, Soul II Soul, or the Family Stand than any pop-R&B circa 2013".

== Chart performance ==
In the United States, the album debuted at number seventy-two on the Billboard 200 the chart issue dated February 16, 2013. The album sold 6,000 copies in the first week of release. In its second week the album dropped to number one-hundred and twenty-two. In its third week the album dropped to one-hundred and fifty-one. The album spent a total of four weeks on the Billboard 200 Albums chart with its final chart at number one-hundred and sixty-six. The album also debuted at number seven on the R&B Albums chart and number fourteen on the Top R&B/Hip-Hop Albums chart.

In the United Kingdom, the album debuted at number forty-four on the UK Albums Chart and number three on the UK R&B Albums Chart on February 10, 2013. In Ireland, the compilation debuted at number twenty-seven on the Irish Albums Chart for the week ending February 7, 2013. Across other European countries, the album peaked within the top one-hundred in Italy and Switzerland. The album charted at number one-hundred and forty-nine in France.

In Australia the album charted at number sixty-nine on the Australian Albums Chart and number fourteen on the Australian Urban Albums Chart.

== Track listing ==
Love Songs track listing
No.	Title	Writer(s)	Original album	Length
1.	"Cater 2 U"	Beyoncé Knowles; Kelly Rowland; Michelle Williams; Rodney Jerkins; Ricky Lewis; Robert Waller	Destiny Fulfilled, 2004	4:05
2.	"Killing Time"	Dwayne Wiggins; Taura Stinson	Destiny's Child, 1998	5:07
3.	"Second Nature"	Ronald Isley; Rudolph Isley; Marvin Isley; Ernie Isley; O'Kelly Isley; Chris Jasper; Terry T.; Kymberli Armstrong	Destiny's Child	5:08
4.	"Heaven" (performed by Kelly Rowland)	Rowland; Alonzo Jackson; Taura Jackson; Todd Mushaw	Simply Deep, 2002	3:59
5.	"Now That She's Gone"	Ken Fambro; Donnie Boynton; Tara Geter; Latrelle Simmons; Aleese Simmons	The Writing's on the Wall, 1999	5:33
6.	"Brown Eyes"	Knowles; Walter Afanasieff	Survivor, 2001	4:33
7.	"If"	Knowles; Rowland; M. Williams; Dana "Rockwilder" Stinson; Big Drawers; Charles Jackson; Marvin Yancy	Destiny Fulfilled	4:15
8.	"Emotion"	Barry Gibb; Robin Gibb	Survivor	3:55
9.	"If You Leave" (featuring Next)	Nycolia Turman; Robert L. Huggar; Chad Elliott; Oshea Hunter	The Writing's on the Wall	4:33
10.	"T-Shirt"	Knowles; Rowland; M. Williams; Andre Harris; Vidal Davis; Sean Garrett; Angela Beyincé	Destiny Fulfilled	4:39
11.	"Temptation"	Knowles; Rowland; LeToya Luckett; LaTavia Roberson; Wiggins; Carl Wheeler; Anthony Ray	The Writing's on the Wall	4:03
12.	"Say My Name" (Timbaland remix)	Knowles; Rowland; Luckett; Roberson; R. Jerkins; Fred Jerkins III; LaShawn Daniels; Timothy Mosley; Static Major	This Is the Remix, 2002	5:01
13.	"Love"	Knowles; Rowland; M. Williams; Erron Williams; Beyince	Destiny Fulfilled	4:29
14.	"Nuclear"	Pharrell Williams; M. Williams; James Fauntleroy; J. "Lonny" Bereal		3:56
Total length:				63:31

== Charts ==
Weekly chart performance for Love Songs
Chart (2013)	Peak position
Australian Albums (ARIA)	69
Australian Urban Albums (ARIA)	14
French Albums (SNEP)	149
Greek Albums (IFPI)	44
Irish Albums (IRMA)	27
Italian Albums (FIMI)	69
Japanese Albums (Oricon)	84
Swiss Albums (Schweizer Hitparade)	89
UK Albums (Official Charts)	44
UK R&B Albums (Official Charts)	3
US Billboard 200	72
US Top R&B Albums (Billboard)	7
US Top R&B/Hip-Hop Albums (Billboard)	14

== Release history ==
Release dates and formats for Love Songs
Region	Date	Format	Label	Ref.
United States	January 25, 2013	CD; digital download	Columbia Records	
United Kingdom	January 25, 2013	CD; digital download	Columbia Records	
Australia	January 25, 2013	CD; digital download	Columbia Records	
France	January 25, 2013	CD; digital download	Columbia Records	
Italy	January 25, 2013	CD; digital download	Columbia Records	
Switzerland	January 25, 2013	CD; digital download	Columbia Records	
