= Live in Atlanta =

Live video album by Destiny's Child

Video / Live album by Destiny's Child
- Released: March 28, 2006
- Recorded: July 15, 2005
- Venues: Philips Arena (Atlanta, Georgia)
- Genres: R&B; hip-hop; neo-soul; gospel
- Length: 110 minutes
- Label: Columbia
- Director: Julia Knowles
- Producer: Sharon Ali

Destiny's Child chronology
#1's (2005)	Live in Atlanta (2006)	Mathew Knowles & Music World Present Vol.1: Love Destiny (2008)

Live in Atlanta is a video album by American girl group Destiny's Child, released on March 28, 2006. It was recorded on July 15, 2005, during their Destiny Fulfilled ... And Lovin' It tour in Atlanta, Georgia at Philips Arena. The DVD debuted at number one on the Billboard Music DVD charts and was certified platinum by the Recording Industry Association of America.

== Track listing ==
=== Track listing ===
DVD
No.	Title	Artist	Length
1.	"Intro/Overture"	Destiny's Child	2:39
2.	"Say My Name"	Destiny's Child	4:32
3.	"Independent Women Part I"	Destiny's Child	3:01
4.	"No, No, No Part 2"	Destiny's Child	1:38
5.	"Medley: Bug A Boo/Bills, Bills, Bills/Bootylicious/Jumpin' Jumpin'"	Destiny's Child	6:13
6.	"Soldier" (Dance Interlude)	Destiny's Child	4:34
7.	"Soldier"	Destiny's Child ft. T.I. and Lil Wayne	5:15
8.	"Dance Break"	Destiny's Child	1:43
9.	"Dilemma"	Kelly Rowland	4:57
10.	"Do You Know"	Michelle Williams	5:26
11.	"Beyoncé Intro"	Beyoncé	2:07
12.	"Baby Boy"	Beyoncé	3:31
13.	"Naughty Girl"	Beyoncé	2:32
14.	"Band Introduction"	Destiny's Child	2:09
15.	"Cater 2 U"	Destiny's Child	3:11
16.	"Cater 2 U" (Dance Interlude)	Destiny's Child	6:24
17.	"Girl"	Destiny's Child	5:31
18.	"Free"	Destiny's Child	4:41
19.	"If" (Acapella Interlude)	Destiny's Child	1:29
20.	"Through With Love" (featuring Destiny's Choir)	Destiny's Child	4:13
21.	"Bad Habit"	Kelly Rowland	3:18
22.	"Dance Ballet/Dangerously in Love 2"	Beyoncé	8:05
23.	"Crazy In Love"	Beyoncé	4:23
24.	"Salsa Dance"	Destiny's Child	2:07
25.	"Survivor"	Destiny's Child	6:15
26.	"Lose My Breath/Credits"	Destiny's Child	11:37

CD
No.	Title	Length
1.	"Intro"	2:01
2.	"Say My Name"	3:54
3.	"Independent Woman Pt. I"	2:34
4.	"Medley: No, No, No Pt.II/Bug A Boo/Bills, Bills, Bills/Bootylicious/Jumpin' Jumpin'"	8:19
5.	"Soldier"	4:38
6.	"Dilemma"	4:22
7.	"Do You Know"	4:43
8.	"Baby Boy"	3:30
9.	"Naughty Girl"	2:12
10.	"Cater 2 U"	7:13
11.	"Girl"	4:59
12.	"Free/If"	4:17
13.	"Through With Love"	3:26
14.	"Bad Habit"	2:43
15.	"Dangerously In Love 2"	5:53
16.	"Crazy in Love"	3:35
17.	"Survivor"	5:32
18.	"Lose My Breath"	7:48

=== Remix CD (available only on Japanese version) ===
1. "Cater 2 U" (Storch Remix Edit) – 4:09
2. "Survivor" (Azza's Soul Remix Radio Edit) – 3:57
3. "Bootylicious" (M&J's Jelly Remix) – 3:41
4. "Stand Up For Love" (Maurice's Nu Soul Mix) – 7:15
5. "Girl" (JS Club Mix) – 6:42
6. "Lose My Breath" (Paul Johnson's Club Mix) – 6:07

=== Bonus features ===
- Destiny's Child – A Family Affair
- Fan Testimonials (Favorite Song, Cater 2 U – The Chosen Few, Favorite Costumes, The Show)
- Kelly Rowland Sophomore CD Teaser
- Dreamgirls Movie & Soundtrack Trailer

=== Bonus audio tracks ===
- "Flashback" (featuring Kelly Rowland)
- "Check on It" (Remix) featuring Beyoncé (Bun B & Slim Thug)
- "Let's Stay Together" (featuring Michelle Williams)

=== Bonus music videos ===
- "Check on It" featuring Beyoncé (Bun B & Slim Thug)
- "Stand Up for Love" (Japan only)
- "Girl" (Japan only)
- "Cater 2 U"

=== Special features ===
- PCM Stereo
- Dolby Digital 5.1 Surround

== Charts ==
=== Weekly charts ===
Chart (2006)	Peak position
Dutch Music DVD (MegaCharts)	4
Japan DVDs (Oricon)	7
UK Music Videos (Official Charts)	6
US Top Music Videos (Billboard)	1

=== Year-end charts ===
Chart (2006)	Position
Dutch Music DVD (MegaCharts)	46

== Certifications ==
Region	Certification	Certified units/sales
United States (RIAA)	Platinum	100,000^{^}
^{^} Shipments figures based on certification alone.
