= Mathew Knowles & Music World Present Vol.1: Love Destiny =

Compilation album by Destiny's Child
- Released: June 25, 2008
- Recorded: 1998–2008
- Genres: R&B; hip hop
- Length: 70:15
- Labels: Columbia; Sony Music
- Producers: Beyoncé Knowles; Rich Harrison; BAM & Ryan; Darkchild; The Neptunes; Polow da Don; Sean Garrett; Jason Perry; S-Dot; Blac Elvis; Cory Rooney; Trackmasters; Wayne Wilkins; Andrew Frampton; Freemasons; Jim Jonsin; Anthony Dent; S*A*M & Sluggo; Stargate; Ne-Yo; Swizz Beatz; The Underdogs

Destiny's Child chronology
Live in Atlanta (2006)	Mathew Knowles & Music World Present Vol.1: Love Destiny (2008)	Playlist: The Very Best of Destiny's Child (2012)

Mathew Knowles & Music World Present Vol.1: Love Destiny is a compilation album released by R&B group Destiny's Child. This album was only released in Japan at the end of June 2008 to commemorate the tenth anniversary of the group. It consists of a few songs the group and three songs from singer Solange Knowles, member Beyoncé's younger sister, who is not part of the group. There are also two bonus tracks from Lady Lux and Lyfe Jennings.

== Track listing ==
Mathew Knowles & Music World Present Vol.1: Love Destiny – Standard edition
No.	Title	Writer(s)	Artist	Length
1.	"Crazy in Love" (featuring Jay-Z)	Beyoncé Knowles; Rich Harrison; Shawn Carter; Eugene Record	Beyoncé	3:58
2.	"Dilemma" (featuring Kelly Rowland)	Cornell Haynes Jr.; Antoine Macon; Kenneth Gamble; Walter Sigler	Nelly	4:51
3.	"Lose My Breath"	Beyoncé Knowles; Kelendria Rowland; Tenitra Williams; Rodney Jerkins; Fred Jerkins III; Garrett Hamler; LaShawn Daniels; Carter	Destiny's Child	4:03
4.	"Honesty"	William Joel	Beyoncé	3:46
5.	"I Decided"	Pharrell Williams; Solange Knowles	Solange	4:17
6.	"Déjà Vu" (featuring Jay-Z)	Beyoncé Knowles; Rodney Jerkins; Delisha Thomas; Makeba Riddick; Keli Price; Carter	Beyoncé	4:03
7.	"Itoldyaso"	Solange Knowles; Shea Taylor	Solange	4:01
8.	"Like This" (featuring Eve)	Hamler; Eve Jeffers; Jamal Jones; Jason Perry; Rowland; Elvis Williams	Kelly Rowland	3:38
9.	"Independent Women" (Part 1)	Beyoncé Knowles; Cory Rooney; Samuel Barnes; Jean-Claude Olivier	Destiny's Child	3:42
10.	"We Break the Dawn" (DJ Montay Remix) (featuring Flo Rida)	Solange Knowles; Andrew Frampton; Wayne Wilkins	Michelle Williams	4:07
11.	"Work" (Freemasons Radio Edit)	Jason Boyd; Scott Storch; Rowland	Kelly Rowland	3:13
12.	"Hello Heartbreak"	Richard Butler Jr.; James Scheffer	Michelle Williams	4:09
13.	"Survivor"	Beyoncé Knowles; Anthony Dent; Mathew Knowles	Destiny's Child	3:51
14.	"Daylight" (featuring Travis McCoy of Gym Class Heroes)	Robert Womack; Harold Payne	Kelly Rowland	3:31
15.	"Say My Name"	Rodney Jerkins; Fred Jerkins III; Daniels; Beyoncé Knowles; LeToya Luckett; Rowland; LaTavia Roberson	Destiny's Child	4:02
16.	"Irreplaceable"	Shaffer Smith; Mikkel Eriksen; Tor Hermansen; Espen Lind; Amund Bjørklund; Beyoncé Knowles	Beyoncé	3:49
17.	"Check on It" (featuring Bun B & Slim Thug)	Beyoncé Knowles; Kasseem Dean; Bernard Freeman; Hamler; Angela Beyincé; Stayve Thomas	Beyoncé	3:33
18.	"Listen"	Henry Krieger; Scott Cutler; Anne Preven; Beyoncé Knowles	Beyoncé	3:41
Total length:				70:15

Mathew Knowles & Music World Present Vol.1: Love Destiny – Bonus tracks
No.	Title	Writer(s)	Artist	Length
19.	"This My Song"	Tammie August	Lady Lux	3:46
20.	"Midnight Train" (featuring Shota Shimizu)		Lyfe Jennings	3:20
Total length:				77:21

Mathew Knowles & Music World Present Vol.2: Love Destiny – 2016 bonus track
No.	Title	Artist	Length
1.	"Old School Back"	Blushhh	3:13
Total length:			3:13

== Charts ==
Chart (2008)	Peak position
Japanese Albums (Oricon)	18
