= Girl (Destiny's Child song) =

2005 single by Destiny's Child

Single by Destiny's Child

from the album Destiny Fulfilled
- B-side: "Got's My Own"
- Released: March 14, 2005
- Recorded: 2004
- Studio: Sony (New York City)
- Genre: Soul; R&B
- Length: 3:44
- Label: Columbia
- Songwriters: Beyoncé Knowles; Kelly Rowland; Michelle Williams; Patrick "9th Wonder" Douthit; Sean Garrett; Angela Beyincé; Don Davis; Eddie Robinson
- Producers: Patrick Douthit; Kelly Rowland; Beyoncé Knowles

Destiny's Child singles chronology
| "Soldier" (2004) | "Girl" (2005) | "Cater 2 U" (2005) |

Music video
- "Girl" on YouTube

"Girl" is a song recorded by American girl group Destiny's Child for their fifth studio album Destiny Fulfilled (2004). The group co-wrote the song with Darkchild, Ric Rude, Angela Beyincé, Sean Garrett, and Patrick "9th Wonder" Douthit; the latter co-produced it with group members Beyoncé and Kelly Rowland. Sampling "Ocean of Thoughts and Dreams" by the Dramatics, the soul song was written about an abusive relationship Rowland went through during the time of writing. "Girl" was released as the third single from Destiny Fulfilled on March 14, 2005, by Columbia Records.

"Girl" received mostly positive reviews by music critics, who praised its composition and lyrical content. It was a moderate commercial success, peaking at number 23 on the US Billboard Hot 100 and was certified gold by the Recording Industry Association of America (RIAA). Internationally, it reached the top ten in Australia, Ireland, New Zealand, and the United Kingdom. The accompanying music video for the song was directed by Bryan Barber and depicted a story inspired by Sex and the City. The group performed the song live in 2005 during three televised appearances and their final tour Destiny Fulfilled... and Lovin' It. In 2015, "Girl" was sampled on "The Girl Is Mine" by British duo 99 Souls.

== Writing and production ==
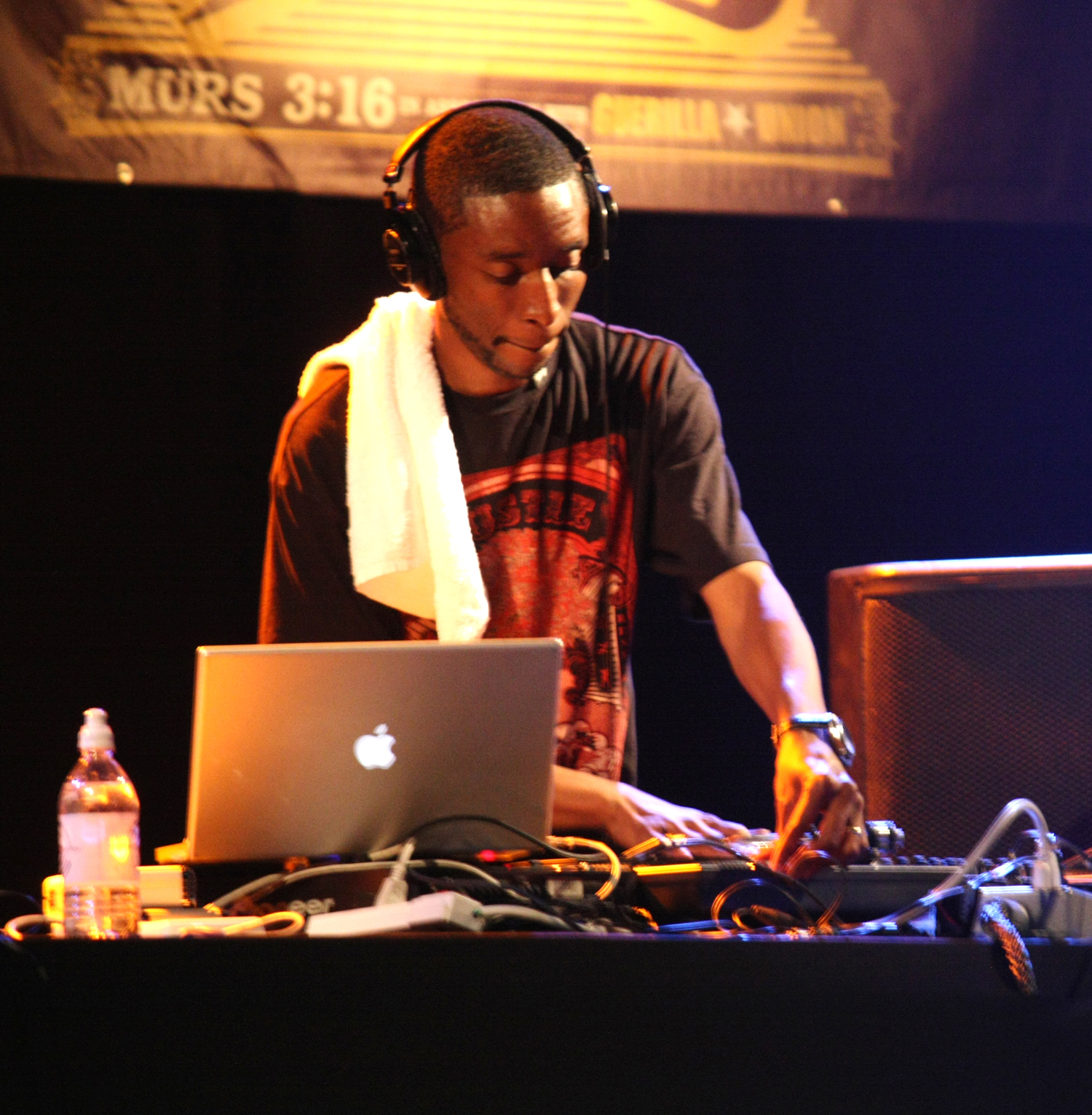
Patrick "9th Wonder" Douthit served as one of the writers and producers of "Girl".

In June 2013, Kelly Rowland revealed during an interview with Hot 107.9 Morning Show that Beyoncé and Michelle Williams wrote "Girl" as a request for her to escape an abusive relationship; the same topic was discussed in Rowland's "Dirty Laundry" (2013) and her fans were the first to "connect [the] dots" and discover the inspiration behind "Girl". Rowland elaborated, "Of course, I did [feel emotional upon hearing 'Girl']! The girls [Beyonce and Michelle Williams] [sic] wrote it for me. Destiny's Child is deeper than what people see on the surface. Those are my homies for life... Those girls, we stuck with each other – period."

Producer 9th Wonder initially met Beyoncé while she was in the recording studio as her future husband, rapper Jay-Z, recorded the song "Threat" for his 2003 album The Black Album. After Jay went through the CD of tracks that 9th Wonder handed to him, Beyoncé mentioned that she liked what she heard from him. Several months later, 9th received a call from Jay-Z asking for him to give the CD of tracks to Destiny's Child. He was surprised at being contacted by the rapper about working with the group, as 9th confessed that he never owned an album by Destiny's Child. He later traveled to Los Angeles to work on the songs with the trio for their next album Destiny Fulfilled. During the three-day session, he produced the songs "Girl", "Is She the Reason" and "Game Over"–all of which made either the standard or international edition's track listing for Destiny Fulfilled.

"Girl" was written by Destiny's Child members Beyoncé, Kelly Rowland and Michelle Williams as well as Darkchild, Ric Rude, Angela Beyincé, Sean Garrett, and Patrick "9th Wonder" Douthit, with production handled by Beyoncé, Rowland and 9th Wonder. It was recorded by Jim Caruana at Sony Music Studios in New York City in 2004. The song was mixed by Dave "Hard Drive" Pensado and mastered by Tom Coyne.

== Music and lyrics ==
"Girl"
A 21-second sample from the chorus of "Girl", a soul song which was noted for its resemblance to material by Zhané and Motown as noted by critics.

"Girl" samples the song "Ocean of Thoughts and Dreams", written by Don Davis and Eddie Robinson and performed by The Dramatics. According to the sheet music published on the website Musicnotes.com by Sony/ATV Music Publishing, "Girl" was composed using common time in the key of C♯ minor with a moderate tempo of 90 beats per minute. The vocal elements span from the low note of E_{3} to the high note of E_{5}. "Girl" was noted for containing elements of soul music in its composition. Eric Henderson from the website Slant Magazine described the song as Zhané-esque. Dimitri Ehrlich of Vibe magazine felt that it sounded like a "Motown classic on steroids".

Lyrically, the song talks about two female friends being concerned about their other friend who denies being in a bad romantic relationship and tries to convince them that nothing is wrong. As the girls know what is really happening, they try to comfort her and make her leave the partner. A writer of The Times of India found a break-up theme in the song, further saying that "In 'Girl', the relational mishaps play out as three-way girl talk, with two girlfriends trying to help their sister see the truth of a bad connection". It opens with Beyoncé singing the lines "Take a minute girl, come sit down/ And tell us what's been happening/ In your face I can see the pain/ Don't try and convince us you're happy."

== Release ==
In early 2005, a poll was conducted on Destiny's Child's official website, asking from the group's fans to choose their "favorite" song between "Girl" and "Cater 2 U". Following this, "Girl" was released as the third single from Destiny Fulfilled. In the United States, it was added to rhythmic contemporary and contemporary hit radio on March 15, 2005. In the United Kingdom, two separate CD singles of the song were released on April 25, 2005. In Germany, a vinyl single was released on May 2, 2005, and the following day it was also released in the US. A CD single consisting of the album track and a Kardinal Beats Remix was released on May 16 in the former country. An extended play (EP) consisting of remixes of "Girl" was released on May 17, 2005. The same day, a maxi single was released in Germany also consisting of several remixes of "Girl". "Girl" was included on the group's compilation albums #1's (2005) and Playlist: The Very Best of Destiny's Child (2012).

== Critical reception ==
Lynsey Hanley writing for The Daily Telegraph described "Girl" as an obvious choice for a single and hailed it as "Beyoncé's requisite feminist anthem". A reviewer from Billboard magazine felt that the band's "personal transition from teen-dom to womanhood" was most evident on "Girl" among other songs. Slant Magazine's Eic Henderson felt that it was a "smooth bump-and-grinder... almost sunk by the group's hyperbolic vocal arrangements". Vibe's writer Dimitri Ehrlich concluded, "Destiny's Child refuses to play it safe with cookie-cutter formulas" something he found evident on "Girl". The Observer reviewer Kitty Empire noted that the band's characteristic female solidarity, "is limply expressed in 'Girl', on which they purport to be your best friend". While reviewing #1's, Thomas Inskeep from Stylus Magazine described the song as "lovely". Jess Harvell writing for Pitchfork Media opined, "'Girl' was a stroll over a 9th Wonder-produced Dramatics sample through bros-before-hoes territory as latte frothy as its Sex and the City video." Idolator's Mike Wass gave a more mixed review for "Girl" describing it as "slightly sappy".

For Beyoncé's 32nd birthday, Erika Ramirez and Jason Lipshutz of Billboard included "Girl" at number 30 on their list "Beyonce's 30 Biggest Billboard Hits". They remarked that it was an album highlight and added: "[it] will be remembered as one of Destiny's Child's minor singles, but its soulful melody, pitch-perfect harmonies... encapsulated the reason the R&B trio gelled so effortlessly". In 2013, Lindsey Weber from Vulture put "Girl" at number five on her list of the top 25 songs by Destiny's Child, praising it for giving an accurate and "catchy" portrayal of concerned women.

== Commercial performance ==
In the United States, "Girl" debuted at number 90 on the Billboard Hot 100 dated April 2, 2005. The following week, it climbed to number 71 and gradually ascended the chart within several weeks. It peaked at number 23 on the chart issue dated May 28, 2005, and spent a total of 19 weeks on the chart; this made it Destiny's Child's lowest-charting single there since "Bug a Boo" (1999). "Girl" performed better on the US Hot R&B/Hip-Hop Songs, where it peaked at number ten for the week ending June 4, 2005. It became the third single from Destiny Fulfilled to enter the chart's top ten and the group's 11th top-ten song. In 2005, "Girl" placed at number 57 on the year-end Hot R&B/Hip-Hop Songs chart. The single further peaked at number 27 on Mainstream Top 40. On October 21, 2005, "Girl" was certified gold by the Recording Industry Association of America (RIAA) for sales of 500,000 digital copies in the US.

"Girl" was a moderate success across Europe. It managed to peak at numbers 49 and 56 in Sweden and Austria, respectively, charting for two weeks in the former and four weeks in the latter. On the Danish Singles Chart, "Girl" peaked at number 13 in its only week of charting on June 10, 2005. It also peaked at number 12 in Italy on May 5, 2005, charting for only one week. It was more successful in the United Kingdom and Ireland, after picking up strong airplay and videoplay in those countries. It debuted at number six on the UK Singles Chart on May 7, 2005, becoming the third top-ten single from Destiny Fulfilled in the country. Starting from the following week, when it fell to number eight, it started gradually descending the chart, which made its debut position become its peak. On the Irish Singles Chart, "Girl" debuted and peaked at number eight for the week ending April 28, 2005.

The single achieved success across Oceania. In Australia, "Girl" debuted and peaked at number five on the ARIA Singles Chart. It spent the following three consecutive weeks within the top ten of the chart and returned to the top ten, at number ten, in its sixth week. The Australian Recording Industry Association (ARIA) awarded "Girl" with a gold certification for selling 35,000 copies in the country. On the New Zealand Singles Chart, the single reached number six in its second week on May 16, 2005. It further spent five weeks at number nine and was last seen on the chart on August 1 at number 38.

== Music video ==
The accompanying music video for "Girl" was directed by Bryan Barber and released in mid-February 2005 along with the video for "Cater 2 U". It was inspired by Sex and the City, containing elements and influences of the series in many scenes. The video is split into two different sets: Destiny's Child in Beyoncé Knowles' apartment and the trio on a fictional television show. It begins with Michelle Williams and Kelly Rowland entering Knowles' apartment as she writes on her laptop. They settle down with snacks and wine as they watch a fictional show set in New York City, styled after Sex and the City. After the opening credits, Knowles and Williams meet Rowland on the TV for lunch at a restaurant. Throughout the video, the women at home respond to the events of the program through gestures and actions, while, on the television, the dialogue of the song matches their conversations in the restaurant. Knowles confronts Rowland about her sad demeanor and suspected boyfriend problems, but she feigns shock and insists that nothing is wrong; however, neither Williams nor Knowles are convinced. Viewers can see that, on one occasion, her boyfriend took very long to come home without explanation and, when he finally arrived, a hurt Rowland threw his food away before running upstairs avoiding him. Rowland admits to some problems, while making excuses for her boyfriend, such as his busy schedule and her own moodiness. Knowles, however, rolls her eyes at the thin excuses, and assures Rowland that she and Williams love her and she does not need not to suffer alone. At this, Rowland begins to cry and laugh at the same time. Williams goes on to tell her of the day she confronted her boyfriend when she saw him browsing through jewelry with another woman. During the last minute of the video, Rowland can be seen be seen looking cold and angry as her boyfriend comes home. He arrives apologetic, but she perks up, dangling a pair of fuzzy handcuffs. He smiles and begins to follow her upstairs. In the following scene, he is naked except for a pair of boxers (in some versions, his rear-end is blurred out) and handcuffed to the balcony. With her bags packed and the handcuff key in hand, she leaves—laughing happily leaving her partner shocked and angry. The girls are finally seen walking down the city street, holding hands, as an image of the album cover of Destiny Fulfilled passes by on a city bus.

Rashaun Hall of MTV News compared Knowles' role to Sarah Jessica Parker's portrayal of Carrie Bradshaw in Sex and the City due to the heels designed by Manolo Blahnik she wore in the video. Erika Ramirez and Jason Lipshutz from Billboard described it as "adorable". Mike Wass from the website Idolator felt that the clip was "dubious". Lindsay Weber writing on behalf of the blog Vulture, noted that it was a "cheesy play" on Sex and the City. Stylus Magazine's Thomas Inskeep opined that the song itself has been "bettered by its Sex and the City homage of a video". The music video is featured on the Tour edition bonus DVD of Destiny Fulfilled, as well as on the Japanese edition of Live in Atlanta (2006). In 2013, it was included on the album Destiny's Child Video Anthology, which contained nearly every music video the group had filmed during their career.

== Live performances ==
Destiny's Child sang "Girl" during the British show Top of the Pops on April 29, 2005. They later appeared on the programme CD:UK, where they performed the song. On July 2, "Girl" was part of Destiny's Child's set list during the Live 8 concert in Philadelphia as the closing song. Gil Kaufman, reporting for MTV News, noted: "The ladies in the audience sang their hearts out during... 'Girl.'" The trio gave a live rendition of the song again on Today on July 29, as part of the show's Toyota Concert Series. At the beginning of the performance, Beyoncé announced that the band wrote the song "for all the girlfriends out there"; "I'll Take You There" (1972) was incorporated during the end.

In 2005, "Girl" was part of the set list of the group's final tour Destiny Fulfilled... and Lovin' It. The performance was preceded by a video interlude, during which Knowles, Williams and Rowland appeared on the screen on the stage. The former two started discussing about the latter's relationship, and she joined them after hearing their opinions. Their discussions were similar to the lyrical content of the song, with the two trying to convince her the relationship is wrong and the latter defending her love interest. After the interlude finished, the group appeared onstage performing "Girl", mixing it with "I'll Take You There". While reviewing a concert in the United Kingdom, Adenike Adenitire of MTV News praised the performance, concluding "They borrowed the Sex and the City theme for the 'Girl' video, but they lean more toward Girlfriends when taking it on the road, with a light comedy moment that may see TV execs thinking seriously about a Destiny's Child sitcom." In contrast, Barbara Ellen of The Observer criticized the segment during which "Girl" was performed, writing "... no amount of 'girlpower' rabble-rousing can disguise the fact the songs are wet-paper-bag weak; giving the impression of three bored young women dozing off at a slumber party, whining in their jim-jams about men who 'done them wrong', or men who 'done someone else wrong', or just men doing wrong, period." The song was included on the track listing of the group's live album Live in Atlanta (2006), chronicling a concert from the tour in that city.

== Samples ==
In 2015, "Girl" was sampled along with Brandy and Monica's "The Boy Is Mine" (1998) on 99 Souls's "The Girl Is Mine". The song was released as a single in late 2015 and managed to peak at number five in the United Kingdom and within the top 40 in other European countries.

== Track listings ==
Australian / European single

1. "Girl" (Radio Version) – 3:45
2. "Girl" (Junior Vasquez Club Dub) – 8:55
3. "Girl" (JS Club Mix) – 6:42
4. "Girl" (The Freshman Remix) – 3:18
5. "Got's My Own" – 3:58

Remixes single EP

1. "Girl" (Single Version) – 3:40
2. "Girl" (Maurice Joshua "U Go Girl" Remix) – 6:04
3. "Girl" (Single Version Instrumental) – 3:40
4. "Girl" (Junior Vasquez Club Dub) – 8:53
5. "Girl" (JS Club Mix) – 6:40

UK / Ireland CD single 1 / European single

1. "Girl" (Radio Edit) – 3:40
2. "Girl" (Kardinal Beats Remix) – 3:02

UK / Ireland CD single 2

1. "Girl" (Radio Edit) – 3:40
2. "Girl" (JS Club Mix) – 6:05
3. "Got's My Own" – 3:59

== Credits and personnel ==
Credits are adapted from the liner notes of the album Destiny Fulfilled.

- Lead vocals: Beyoncé Knowles, Kelly Rowland and Michelle Williams
- Vocal production: Knowles and Rowland
- Recorded by: Jim Caruna at Sony Music Studios, New York City
- Audio mixing: Dave "Hard Drive" Pensado
- Audio mastering: Tom Coyne

== Charts ==
=== Weekly charts ===
Weekly chart performance for "Girl"
| Chart (2005) | Peak position |
|---|---|
| Australia (ARIA) | 5 |
| Australian Urban (ARIA) | 3 |
| Austria (Ö3 Austria Top 40) | 56 |
| Belgium (Ultratop 50 Flanders) | 26 |
| Belgium (Ultratop 50 Wallonia) | 36 |
| Canada CHR/Pop Top 30 (Radio & Records) | 18 |
| Denmark (Tracklisten) | 13 |
| Europe (Eurochart Hot 100) | 19 |
| Germany (GfK) | 38 |
| Greece (IFPI) | 16 |
| Hungary (Rádiós Top 40) | 19 |
| Hungary (Single Top 40) | 9 |
| Ireland (IRMA) | 8 |
| Italy (FIMI) | 12 |
| Netherlands (Dutch Top 40) | 11 |
| Netherlands (Single Top 100) | 22 |
| New Zealand (Recorded Music NZ) | 6 |
| Romania (Romanian Top 100) | 23 |
| Scotland Singles (OCC) | 6 |
| Sweden (Sverigetopplistan) | 49 |
| Switzerland (Schweizer Hitparade) | 26 |
| UK Singles (OCC) | 6 |
| UK Airplay (Music Week) | 2 |
| UK Hip Hop/R&B (OCC) | 2 |
| US Billboard Hot 100 | 23 |
| US Dance Club Songs (Billboard) J. Vasquez/M. Joshua mixes | 5 |
| US Dance Singles Sales (Billboard) | 6 |
| US Hot R&B/Hip-Hop Songs (Billboard) | 10 |
| US Pop Airplay (Billboard) | 27 |
| US Rhythmic Airplay (Billboard) | 22 |

=== Year-end charts ===
Year-end chart performance for "Girl"
| Chart (2005) | Position |
|---|---|
| Australia (ARIA) | 53 |
| New Zealand (RIANZ) | 49 |
| Romania (Romanian Top 100) | 53 |
| UK Singles (OCC) | 97 |
| UK Airplay (Music Week) | 52 |
| UK Urban (Music Week) | 39 |
| US Hot R&B/Hip-Hop Songs (Billboard) | 57 |
| US Mainstream Top 40 (Billboard) | 98 |
| US Rhythmic Top 40 (Billboard) | 95 |

== Certifications ==
Certifications and sales for "Girl"
| Region | Certification | Certified units/sales |
|---|---|---|
| Australia (ARIA) | Gold | 35,000^{^} |
| New Zealand (RMNZ) | Platinum | 30,000^{‡} |
| United Kingdom (BPI) | Silver | 200,000^{‡} |
| United States (RIAA) | Gold | 500,000^{*} |
^{*} Sales figures based on certification alone.^{^} Shipments figures based on certification alone.^{‡} Sales+streaming figures based on certification alone.

== Release history ==
Release dates and formats for "Girl"
| Region | Date | Format(s) | Label(s) | Ref. |
|---|---|---|---|---|
| United States | March 14, 2005 | Contemporary hit radio; rhythmic contemporary radio | Columbia | |
| Australia | April 22, 2005 | Maxi CD | Sony BMG | |
| France | April 25, 2005 | Maxi CD | Columbia | |
| United Kingdom | April 25, 2005 | CD; maxi CD | Columbia | |
| Germany | May 16, 2005 | CD; maxi CD | Sony BMG | |
| United States | May 17, 2005 | Digital download (EP) | Columbia | |
| Denmark | May 30, 2005 | Maxi CD | Sony BMG | |

== See also ==
- New Zealand Top 50 singles of 2005
