= Get on the Bus (song) =

1998 single by Destiny's Child

Single by Destiny's Child featuring Timbaland

from the album Why Do Fools Fall in Love
- B-side: "Illusions"; "Birthday"
- Released: September 21, 1998
- Recorded: June 1998
- Studio: Manhattan Center (New York City)
- Genre: R&B
- Length: 4:44
- Label: Columbia; Elektra
- Songwriters: Melissa Elliott; Timothy Mosley
- Producers: Missy Elliott; Timbaland

Destiny's Child singles chronology
"With Me" (1998)	"Get on the Bus" (1998)	"She's Gone" (1998)

Timbaland singles chronology
"Are You That Somebody?" (1998)	"Get on the Bus" (1998)	"Here We Come" (1998)

Music video
- "Get on the Bus" on YouTube

"Get on the Bus" is a song by the American girl group Destiny's Child featuring American producer Timbaland from the original motion picture soundtrack of Gregory Nava's romantic drama Why Do Fools Fall in Love (1998). It was written and produced by Timbaland and Missy Elliott. As with other Timbaland's 1990s productions, the song features some unorthodox elements, including bird sounds. It was released as the second single from Why Do Fools Fall in Love on September 21, 1998 by Columbia Records and Elektra Records.

"Get on the Bus" was a moderate commercial success throughout Europe, reaching the top 20 in the Netherlands and the United Kingdom. In the United States, it received minor airplay on urban contemporary radio, peaking at number 63 on the US R&B/Hip-Hop Airplay chart. An accompanying music video for the song was directed by Earle Sebastian. The song was later included on the international editions of Destiny's Child's second album The Writing's on the Wall (1999) and included in the set list of their 2001–2002 world tour.

== Background ==
In 1997, rapper Missy Elliott was handpicked by Elektra Records chairman and CEO Sylvia Rhone to executive produce a soundtrack of original songs for director Gregory Nava's romantic drama Why Do Fools Fall in Love (1998), inspired by the life of singer Frankie Lymon, starring Halle Berry, Vivica A. Fox, and Larenz Tate. Breaking away from the historic doo wop-inspired rock & roll of Frankie Lymon & the Teenagers, Elliott collaborated with her longtime production partner Timbaland to write and produce a collection of contemporary R&B tracks to be recorded by various artists for inclusion on the soundtrack.

Among the songs the pair wrote for the album was "Get on the Bus," which depicts a young woman resolute in ending her relationship with her boyfriend, irrespective of his feelings on the matter. Elliott selected Destiny's Child to record the track, with their vocals laid down at Manhattan Center Studios. In September 1998, group member Kelly Rowland elaborated on the song in an interview with the MTV Radio Network: "Your boyfriend's been getting on your nerves and just fussing and the first verse is saying, "I don't want to fuss with you, so I'm gonna sit down on the couch and basically ignore you." Then she says that "it doesn't matter what it takes, but get outta my face, catch a cab, get on a bus, get outta here"."

== Commercial performance ==
Released exclusively in Europe, "Get on the Bus" was issued as the second single from the Why Do Fools Fall in Love soundtrack, following Melanie B's "I Want You Back." The song became a moderate commercial success, reaching number 15 in the Netherlands and in the United Kingdom. It also peaked at number on the UK R&B Singles Chart and number nine on the UK Dance Singles Chart. In the United States, although it was not officially released as a single, the song received limited airplay on urban contemporary radio, which helped it reach number 63 on the US R&B/Hip-Hop Airplay chart.

== Music video ==
An accompanying music video for "Get on the Bus" was directed by Earle Sebastian. It focuses on Destiny's Child, performing in a silver-white room and inside and around a Lincoln Navigator SUV. The members are dressed in white clothes. Timbaland appears during his rap verses, while the choreography was crafted by Fatima Robinson. Frequent Robinson collaborator Aaliyah also contributed to the production in an unspecified role.

== Track listings ==
UK CD single
No.	Title	Writer(s)	Producer(s)	Length
1.	"Get on the Bus" (featuring Timbaland) (Radio Version)	Melissa Elliott; Tim Mosley	Missy Elliott; Timbaland	4:08
2.	"Get on the Bus" (Radio Edit without rap)	Elliott; Mosley	Elliott; Timbaland	3:23
3.	"Illusions" (Destiny Club Mix)	Isaac Hayes; Tony Swain; Steve Jolley; Ashley Ingram; Leslie John	Maurice Joshua	8:05

UK cassette
No.	Title	Writer(s)	Producer(s)	Length
1.	"Get on the Bus" (featuring Timbaland) (Radio Version)	Elliott; Mosley	Elliott; Timbaland	4:08
2.	"Illusions" (Destiny Club Mix)	Hayes; Swain; Jolley; Ingram; John	Joshua	8:05

European maxi single
No.	Title	Writer(s)	Producer(s)	Length
1.	"Get on the Bus" (featuring Timbaland) (Radio Version)	Elliott; Mosley	Elliott; Timbaland	4:08
2.	"Get on the Bus" (Radio Edit without rap)	Elliott; Mosley	Elliott; Timbaland	3:23
3.	"Birthday"	Beyoncé Knowles; Kelly Rowland; Latavia Roberson; Dwayne Wiggins	Wiggins	5:13

== Credits and personnel ==
Credits adapted from the liner notes of The Writing's on the Wall.

- Jimmy Douglass – engineering, mixing
- Missy Elliott – writing, production
- Beyoncé Knowles – vocals
- LeToya Luckett – vocals
- LaTavia Roberson – vocals
- Kelly Rowland – vocals
- Timbaland – mixing, vocals, writing, production
- Todd Wachsmuth – engineering/mixing assistance

== Charts ==
=== Weekly charts ===
Weekly chart performance for "Get on the Bus"
Chart (1998–1999)	Peak position
Europe (European Hot 100 Singles)	62
Germany (GfK)	60
Netherlands (Dutch Top 40)	15
Netherlands (Single Top 100)	18
Scottish Singles Sales (Official Charts)	55
UK Singles (Official Charts)	15
UK Dance (Official Charts)	9
UK Hip Hop/R&B (Official Charts)	2
US R&B/Hip-Hop Airplay (Billboard)	63
US Urban Top 50 (Radio & Records)	32

=== Year-end charts ===
Year-end chart performance for "Get on the Bus"
Chart (1999)	Position
Netherlands (Dutch Top 40)	125

== Release history ==
Release dates and formats for "Get on the Bus"
Region	Date	Format(s)	Label(s)	Ref.
United States	September 21, 1998	Urban contemporary radio	Columbia; Elektra	
United States	October 6, 1998	Rhythmic contemporary radio	Columbia; Elektra	
Germany	December 14, 1998	Maxi CD	East West	
United Kingdom	January 11, 1999	12-inch vinyl; cassette; maxi CD	Elektra	
