= Destiny's Child =

American girl group (1990–2006)

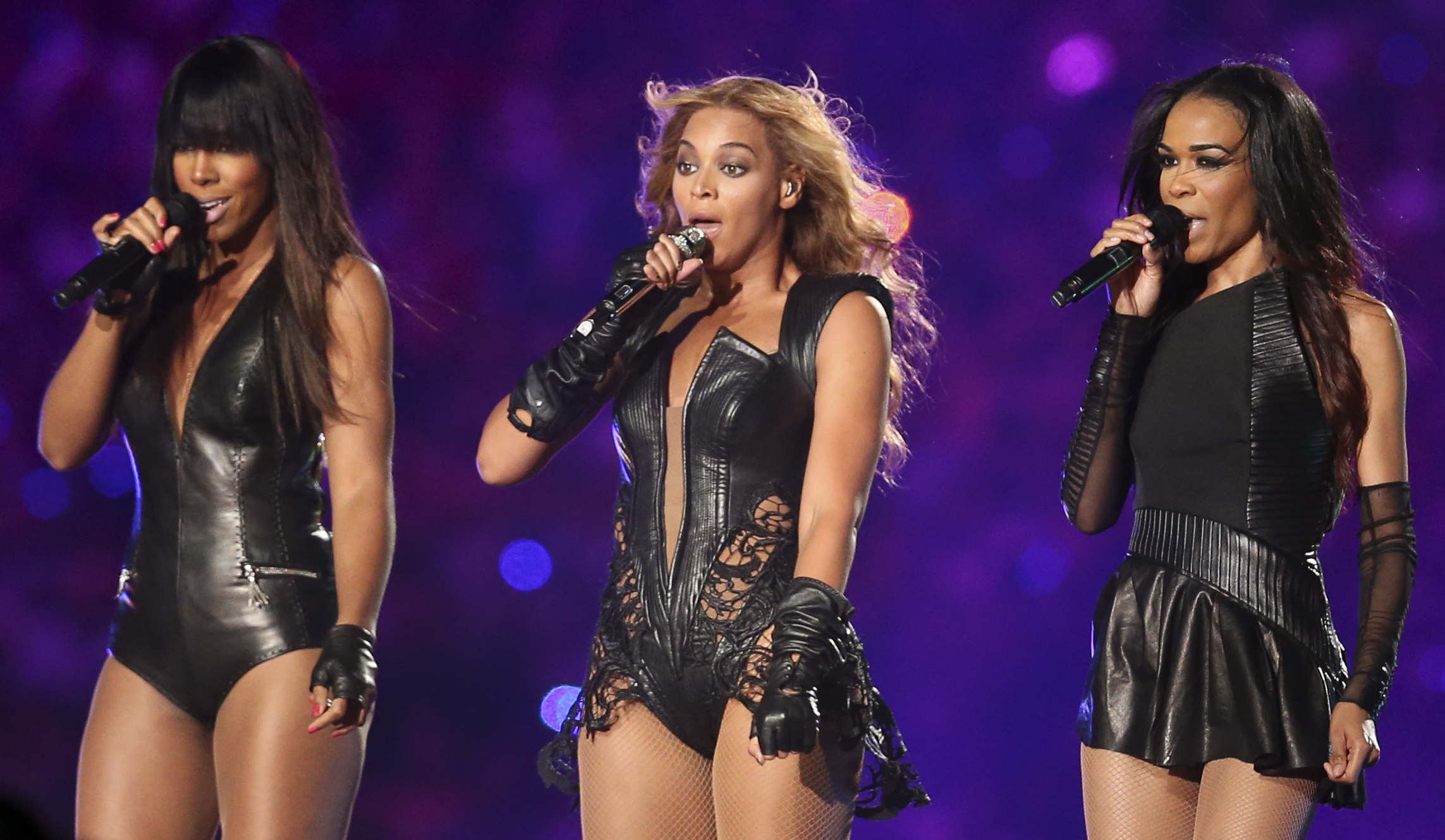
- Destiny's Child in 2013; Left to right: Kelly Rowland, Beyoncé, Michelle Williams

Background information
- Also known as: Girls Tyme (1990–1993); Somethin' Fresh (1993); Cliché (1993); Borderline (1993); The Dolls (1993–1995); Destiny (1995–1996)
- Origin: Houston, Texas, US
- Genres: R&B; pop; hip-hop
- Works: Discography
- Years active: 1990–2006; 2013; 2018; 2025
- Labels: Elektra; Columbia; Music World
- Past members: Beyoncé; LaTavia Roberson; Kelly Rowland; LeToya Luckett; Farrah Franklin; Michelle Williams
- Website: destinyschild.com

Destiny's Child was an American girl group formed in Houston, Texas, in 1990. Through the contributions of its principal members—Beyoncé, Kelly Rowland, Michelle Williams, and original members LaTavia Roberson and LeToya Luckett—the group is regarded as one of the most influential girl groups in popular music. Known for their vocal harmonies, stage performances, and themes of female empowerment, Destiny's Child played a central role in the girl group resurgence of the 1990s and the emergence of rap-singing, while helping shape contemporary R&B.

Starting their musical career as Girl's Tyme, the original quartet—Beyoncé, Rowland, Roberson, and Luckett—were signed to Columbia Records in 1996 as Destiny's Child, gaining recognition with the single "No, No, No". They then released their best-selling album, The Writing's on the Wall (1999), which spawned the US Billboard Hot 100 number-one singles "Bills, Bills, Bills" and "Say My Name". Despite critical and commercial success, the group was plagued by internal conflict and legal turmoil, as Roberson and Luckett attempted to split from the group's manager, Mathew Knowles, due to his favoritism of his daughter Beyoncé and Rowland.

In early 2000, Williams and Farrah Franklin replaced both Roberson and Luckett; Franklin quit after a few months, leaving the group as a trio. The group's third album, Survivor (2001), drew on the internal conflicts and lineup changes, yielding the US number-one singles "Independent Women" and "Bootylicious". After releasing the Christmas album 8 Days of Christmas (2001), Destiny's Child announced a hiatus so that each member could pursue a solo career. They reunited to release their fifth and final album, Destiny Fulfilled (2004), which produced the US top-three singles "Lose My Breath" and "Soldier".

Since the group officially disbanded in 2006, Beyoncé, Rowland, and Williams have reunited several times, including at the 2013 Super Bowl halftime show, the 2018 Coachella festival, and the final show of the Cowboy Carter Tour (2025). Destiny's Child is one of the best-selling girl groups in history, with estimated sales of over 60 million records. Their accolades include three Grammy Awards, eleven Billboard Music Awards, five American Music Awards, two MTV Video Music Awards, and a star on the Hollywood Walk of Fame. Billboard named Destiny's Child's final lineup one of the greatest musical trios of all time.

== History ==
=== 1990–1997: Early beginnings and Girl's Tyme ===
In 1990, Beyoncé met LaTavia Roberson while auditioning for an all-girl entertainment group. Based in Houston, Texas, they joined a group that performed rap and dance routines on the city's talent show circuit. Kelly Rowland, who lived in Beyoncé's house at the time, joined them in 1992. Originally named Girl's Tyme, they were eventually reduced to six members, including Támar Davis and sisters Nikki and Nina Taylor. R&B producer Arne Frager flew to Houston to see the group and later brought them to the Record Plant in Northern California, focusing particularly on Beyoncé's vocals, because he believed she had strong personality and vocal ability. Hoping to secure the group a major record deal, Frager chose to debut them on Star Search, then the biggest talent show on national television. They lost the competition, because, in Beyoncé's opinion, they chose the wrong type of song—they were rapping instead of singing.

After the group's defeat, Beyoncé's father, Mathew Knowles, began voluntarily managing them. He reduced the lineup to four members, removing Davis and the Taylor sisters, and adding LeToya Luckett in 1993. Aside from spending time at their church in Houston, Girl's Tyme practiced in their backyards and at Headliners Salon, owned by Beyoncé's mother, Tina Knowles. They tested routines in the salon—then located on Montrose Boulevard—sometimes even collecting tips from customers, who would also critique their performances. During the school year, the group performed at local events, and when summer arrived, Mathew set up a "boot camp" to train them in dance and vocal performance. After intensive preparation, they began opening for established R&B acts such as SWV, Dru Hill, and Immature. Tina designed the group's stage outfits. Over the early years of their career, Girl's Tyme went through several name changes, becoming Somethin' Fresh, Cliché, the Dolls, Borderline, and Destiny. Under the name Destiny, the group signed with Elektra Records, but they were dropped several months later before releasing an album.

We got the word destiny out of the Bible, but we couldn't trademark the name, so we added child, which is like a rebirth of destiny.

— Beyoncé speaking on the name of Destiny's Child

The pursuit of a record deal placed strain on the Knowles family; in 1995, Mathew resigned from his job as a medical equipment salesman, cutting the family's income in half, and Beyoncé's parents temporarily separated due to the resulting pressure. In 1996, the group adopted the name Destiny's Child, based upon a passage in the Book of Isaiah. Mathew helped negotiate a record deal with Columbia Records at the urging of Columbia scout Teresa LaBarbera Whites, and the group signed with the label that same year. Before signing with Columbia, they had recorded several tracks in Oakland, California, produced by D'wayne Wiggins of Tony! Toni! Toné!. Their major label debut song, "Killing Time", was selected for the soundtrack of the film Men in Black (1997).

=== 1997–2000: The Writing's on the Wall and lineup changes ===
On October 27, 1997, Destiny's Child released their debut single, titled "No, No, No". The song became their first major hit, peaking at number three on the US Billboard Hot 100 chart and atop the Hot R&B/Hip-Hop Songs chart. "No, No, No" preceded their debut studio album, Destiny's Child, which was released on February 17, 1998. The album is an R&B and neo soul set, and its production was handled by a range of producers, including Wiggins, Jermaine Dupri, Wyclef Jean, and Corey Rooney. Destiny's Child peaked at number sixty-seven on the Billboard 200 and number fourteen on the Top R&B/Hip-Hop Albums chart. The album's second single, "With Me", failed to replicate the success of "No, No, No". Beyoncé considered Destiny's Child successful, but not huge, claiming that it was "too mature" for the group at the time.

In 1998, the group's single "Get on the Bus" was included in the soundtrack of the romantic drama Why Do Fools Fall in Love, and they later made a guest appearance in an episode of the sitcom Smart Guy. For their second studio album, Destiny's Child sought to transition from the neo-soul-influenced sound of their debut, enlisting an almost entirely different array of collaborators, including Kevin "She'kspere" Briggs, Kandi Burruss, Missy Elliott, Rodney Jerkins, and LaShawn Daniels. The lead single, "Bills, Bills, Bills", was released on May 31, 1999, and became Destiny's Child's first song to peak at number one on the Billboard Hot 100. The resulting album, The Writing's on the Wall, was released in the US on July 27, 1999, to critical acclaim.

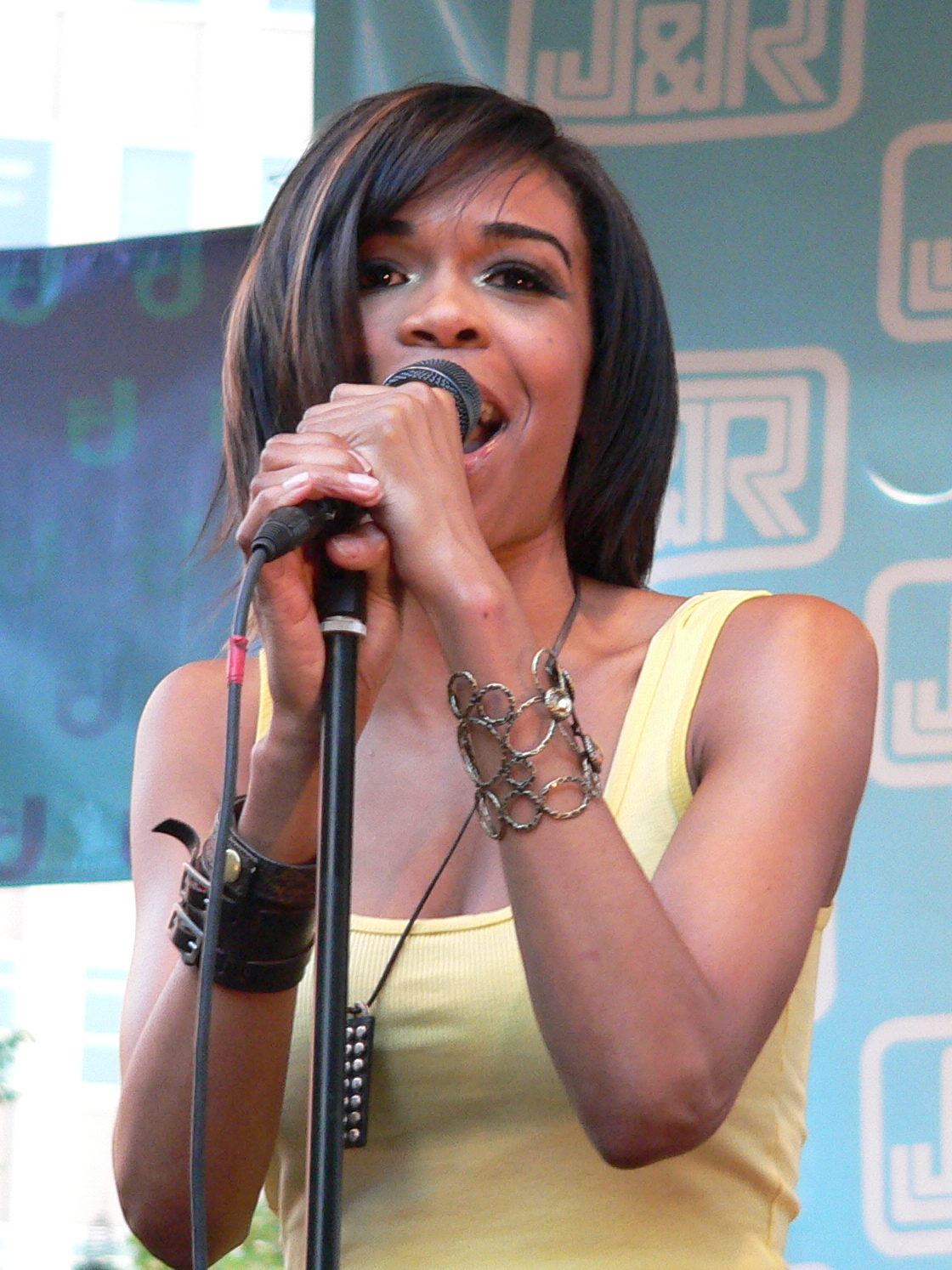
Michelle Williams (pictured) and Farrah Franklin joined the group as replacements for Luckett and Roberson.

In December 1999, Luckett and Roberson attempted to split from Mathew, alleging that he kept a disproportionate share of the group's profits and unfairly favored Beyoncé and Rowland. Although they did not intend to leave the group, they discovered that two new members had been added when the video for "Say My Name", the third single from The Writing's on the Wall, premiered in February 2000. Before the video aired, Beyoncé announced on TRL that Luckett and Roberson had left the group. They were replaced by Michelle Williams—formerly a backup singer for Monica—and Farrah Franklin, an aspiring singer and actress. After working with Monica, Williams was introduced to Destiny's Child by a choreographer friend and was flown to Houston, where she stayed with the Knowles family.

On March 21, 2000, Roberson and Luckett filed a lawsuit against Mathew Knowles and their former bandmates, alleging breach of partnership and fiduciary duties. Five months after joining, Franklin left Destiny's Child. The remaining members stated that her departure was due to missed promotional appearances and concerts, and Williams later said that Franklin struggled with the stress. Franklin explained that she left because of the negativity surrounding the group's internal conflict and her lack of influence in decision-making. Toward the end of 2000, Roberson and Luckett dropped the portion of their lawsuit targeting Beyoncé and Rowland in exchange for a settlement, though they continued legal action against Mathew.

As part of the agreement, both parties were prohibited from speaking publicly about one another. Roberson and Luckett went on to form another girl group, but they eventually left that project. The heightened publicity largely fueled Destiny's Child's success, helping them become a major pop-culture phenomenon. In 2000, "Say My Name" spent three consecutive weeks at the top of the Billboard Hot 100, and the fourth single, "Jumpin', Jumpin'", peaked at number three. The Writing's on the Wall went on to sell over eight million copies in the US, earning an eightfold platinum certification from the RIAA. Worldwide, it has since sold over 13 million copies, becoming one of the best-selling R&B albums of all time. The album spurred their career and introduced them to a wider audience. Around this time, Destiny's Child also joined Britney Spears as a special guest on one date of her (You Drive Me) Crazy Tour and was the opening act for Christina Aguilera in Concert.

=== 2000–2003: Survivor, subsequent releases, hiatus, and solo projects ===
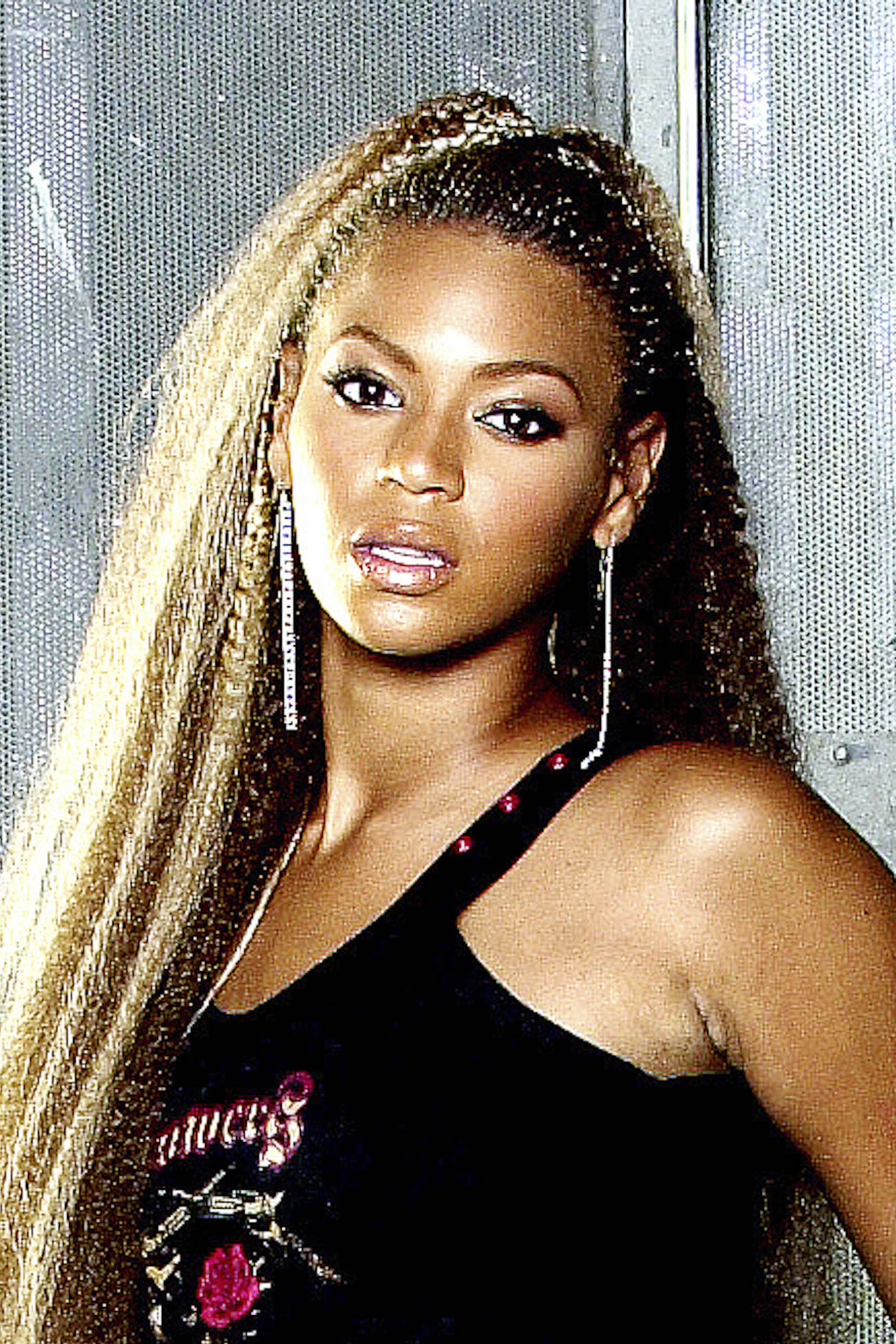
Beyoncé took on a larger creative role when developing Survivor (2001), co-writing and co-producing almost the entire album.

At the 2001 Billboard Music Awards, Destiny's Child won several accolades, including Artist of the Year and Duo/Group of the Year. At the 43rd Annual Grammy Awards, the group won two awards for "Say My Name": Best R&B Vocal Performance by a Duo or Group and Best R&B Song. "Independent Women Part I" was released on August 29, 2000, as both the lead single and theme song for the soundtrack to the film Charlie's Angels (2000). It topped the Billboard Hot 100 for eleven consecutive weeks—from November 2000 to January 2001—becoming Destiny's Child's longest-running number one. "Independent Women Part I" was included on the group's third studio album, titled Survivor.

Beyoncé took on a larger creative role on Survivor, co-producing and co-writing nearly the entire album. In the US, Survivor was released on May 1, 2001, to generally positive reviews. It debuted at number one on the Billboard 200, selling 663,000 copies in its first week. The lead single, "Survivor", preceded the album's release by three months and peaked at number two on the Billboard Hot 100. "Bootylicious", the second single from the album, spent two weeks atop the chart. "Survivor" was interpreted by some as a commentary on the group's internal turmoil, though Beyoncé denied that it targeted any former members. Roberson and Luckett nevertheless viewed the song as violating the parties' non-disparagement agreement and filed another lawsuit against Destiny's Child and Sony Music shortly after the release of This Is the Remix (2002). All remaining litigation was settled in June 2002. By 2004, Survivor had sold over 10 million copies worldwide.

In the aftermath of the September 11 attacks, Destiny's Child canceled a planned European tour and performed at the Concert for New York City, a benefit concert for survivors. On October 30, 2001, the group released the holiday album 8 Days of Christmas, featuring both versions of several traditional Christmas songs as well as original songs. In late 2000, Destiny's Child announced a hiatus to allow each member to pursue individual projects, including solo albums. In 2002, Williams released her debut solo album, Heart to Yours, a contemporary gospel set that topped the Billboard Top Gospel Albums chart. Rowland collaborated with Nelly on "Dilemma", which topped the Billboard Hot 100 and won the two a Grammy Award. That year, Beyoncé co-starred with Mike Myers in the box-office success Austin Powers in Goldmember and recorded her first solo single, "Work It Out", for the film's soundtrack. Rowland's debut solo album, Simply Deep, was released in September 2002, reaching number one on the UK Albums Chart.

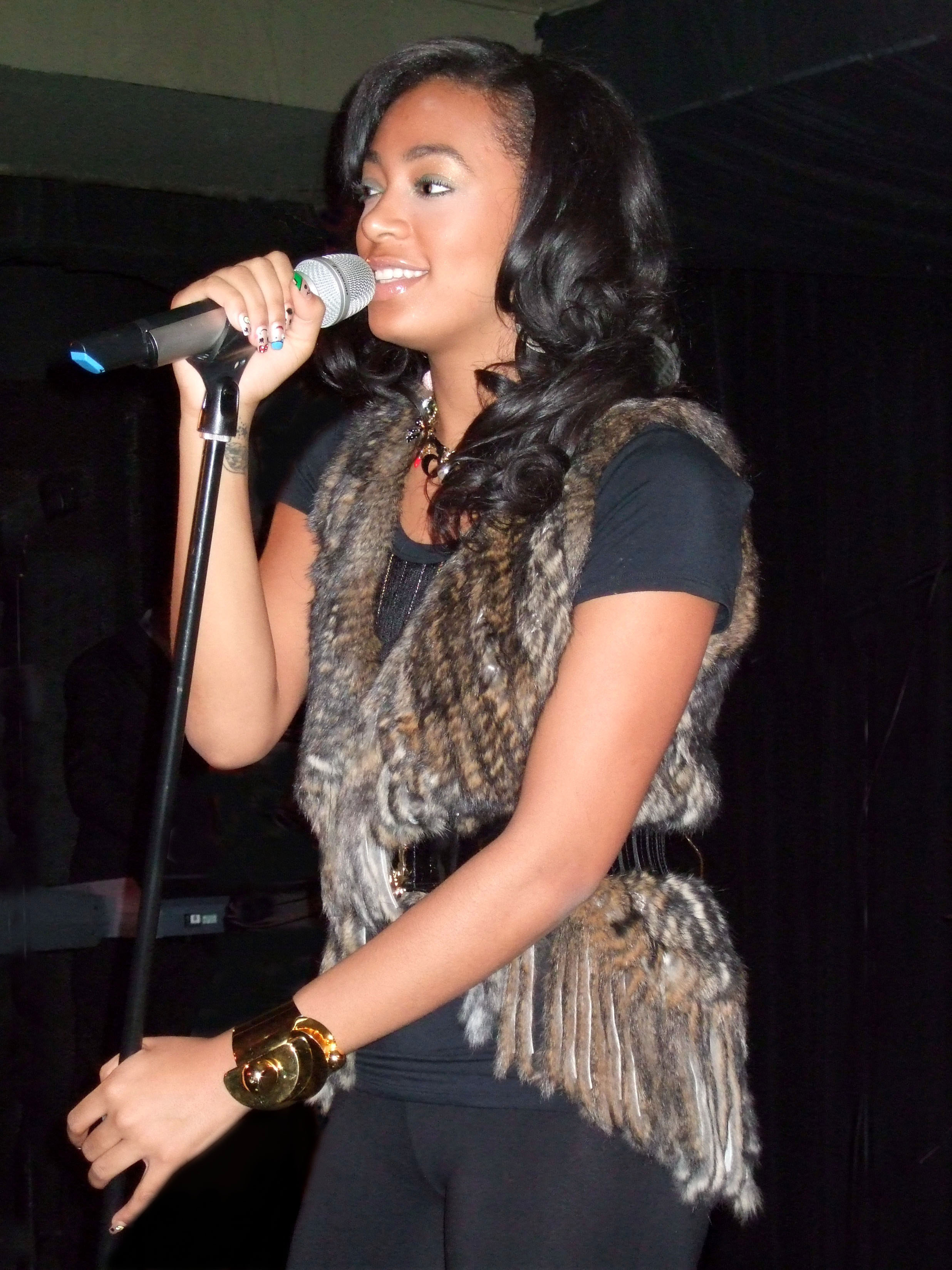
Solange, who had performed and recorded songs with the group, was rumored to join the reunion, but it was later confirmed as a public reaction test.

Rowland made her feature-film debut in the horror crossover Freddy vs. Jason (2003), while Beyoncé filmed The Fighting Temptations (2003) and appeared as a featured vocalist on her then-boyfriend Jay-Z's top-five single "'03 Bonnie & Clyde" (2002). Beyoncé's debut solo album, Dangerously in Love, was the most commercially successful by any of the three Destiny's Child members who released solo projects at the time. Released in June 2003, it debuted at number one on the Billboard 200 and produced the US number-one singles "Crazy in Love" and "Baby Boy", as well as the top-five songs "Me, Myself and I" and "Naughty Girl". Dangerously in Love earned Beyoncé five Grammy Awards, tying three previous performers for the record for the most Grammys won in one night by a female artist. In November 2003, Williams appeared on Broadway as Aida and released her second gospel album, Do You Know, two months later.

In June 2003, Mathew announced that Destiny's Child would expand back to a quartet with the addition of Beyoncé's younger sister, Solange. Destiny's Child had previously recorded songs with Solange and performed with her when she temporarily replaced Rowland after she broke her toes during a performance. Mathew stated, however, that the idea was used to test public reaction. In August 2003, Beyoncé confirmed that her sister would not be joining the group and instead promoted Solange's debut album, Solo Star, released in January 2003.

=== 2003–2005: Destiny Fulfilled and #1's ===
Three years after the hiatus, the members of Destiny's Child reunited to record their fifth and final studio album, Destiny Fulfilled. Its themes delve into the different conversations the trio had during recording, the songs being tied together by interrelated concepts. All three members contributed to the songwriting on most of the album's material and each served as an executive producer. Released on November 15, 2004, Destiny Fulfilled peaked at number two on the Billboard 200 with 497,000 copies sold that week. Four singles were issued from the album: "Lose My Breath", "Soldier", "Cater 2 U", and "Girl"; the first two peaked at number three on the Billboard Hot 100. "Soldier" and "Cater 2 U" were certified platinum by the RIAA in 2006. Despite its mixed critical reception, the album garnered five Grammy Award nominations, including Best Contemporary R&B Album.

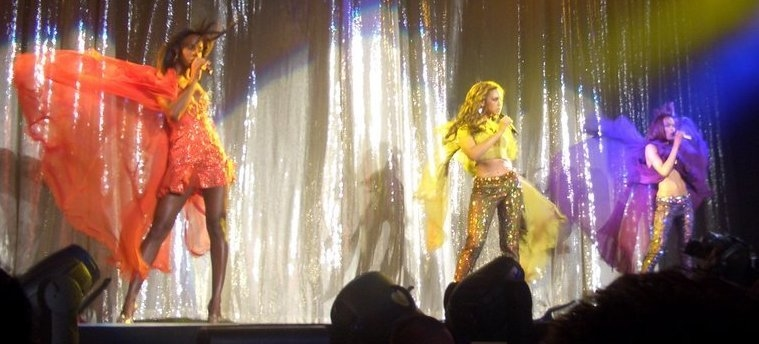
The final lineup of Destiny's Child performing during their 2005 Destiny Fulfilled... and Lovin' It concert tour

To promote the album, Destiny's Child launched the worldwide Destiny Fulfilled... and Lovin' It Tour. On June 11, 2005, during their performance at the Palau Sant Jordi in Barcelona, Spain, the group announced to the audience of 16,000 that they intended to formally disband at the tour's conclusion. Beyoncé later explained that the album title Destiny Fulfilled was deliberate, indicating that the decision to separate had already been made during the album's creation. While working on the project, the members agreed to end their fourteen-year run as a group to pursue their individual ambitions, agreeing that their destinies had already been fulfilled. The group communicated their decision in a letter sent to MTV, stating: "After a lot of discussions and some deep soul searching, we realized that our current tour has given us the opportunity to leave Destiny's Child on a high note".

Destiny's Child released their first greatest hits compilation, #1's, on October 25, 2005. Debuting atop the Billboard 200, the album features several of their most successful songs, including the chart-topping "Bills, Bills, Bills", "Say My Name", "Independent Women Part I", and "Bootylicious". Three new tracks were recorded for the project, among them "Stand Up for Love", created as the theme song for World Children's Day—an annual global effort aimed at raising awareness and funds for children's causes—and "Check on It", which Beyoncé recorded for the soundtrack of the film The Pink Panther (2006). Destiny's Child participated as global ambassadors for the 2005 program of World Children's Day, lending their voices and public support. Despite the album's title, only five of the sixteen tracks had topped either the Billboard Hot 100, leading Billboard's Keith Caulfield to describe the title as "a marketing angle". MTV journalist Chris Harris wrote that the collection "lives up to its name".

=== 2006–present: Disbandment and aftermath ===
Destiny's Child reunited for a farewell performance at the 2006 NBA All-Star Game on February 19, 2006, in Houston, Texas. A few days later, the group delivered their final televised performance at the Fashion Rocks benefit concert in New York. After their formal disbandment, all three members resumed their solo careers, each achieving varying degrees of success. Beyoncé, Rowland, and Williams continued to collaborate on one another's projects through guest features, music video appearances, and live performances. Rowland and Williams—along with Beyoncé's sister Solange—appeared in the music video for Beyoncé's 2007 single "Get Me Bodied". On June 26, 2007, the group briefly reunited at the BET Awards, where Beyoncé performed "Get Me Bodied" with Williams and Solange as her backup dancers; following the performance, she introduced Rowland, who performed her single "Like This" with Eve.

On September 2, 2007, during the Los Angeles stop of the Beyoncé Experience tour, Beyoncé sang a snippet of "Survivor" with Rowland and Williams, after which they sang "Happy Birthday" to her. In 2008, Beyoncé recorded a cover of Billy Joel's "Honesty" for the compilation Mathew Knowles & Music World Present Vol.1: Love Destiny, released to commemorate the group's tenth anniversary. Rowland made a cameo appearance in Beyoncé's music video for "Party" (2011). In 2012, the group released their third compilation album, Playlist: The Very Best of Destiny's Child, to commemorate the fifteenth anniversary of their formation. Their fourth compilation, Love Songs, was released on January 29, 2013, and featured a newly recorded track, "Nuclear", produced by Pharrell Williams and marking Destiny's Child's first original song in eight years. The following month, Rowland and Williams joined Beyoncé as special guests during her Super Bowl XLVII halftime show, where they performed "Bootylicious", "Independent Women", and Beyoncé's "Single Ladies (Put a Ring on It)".

The group released Video Anthology, a video album containing sixteen of their music videos, in the US in June 2013. Beyoncé and Williams were later featured on Rowland's song "You Changed" from her fourth solo album, Talk a Good Game (2013). That same year, Rowland and Williams made cameo appearances in Beyoncé's music videos for "Superpower" and "Grown Woman", both from her fifth solo studio album, Beyoncé (2013). In June 2014, Williams released the single "Say Yes", featuring Beyoncé and Rowland. They reunited again for Beyoncé's Coachella headline performance in April 2018, which was later released as the Homecoming documentary and live album. The group also reunited for the closing night of Beyoncé's Cowboy Carter Tour in July 2025.

== Artistry ==
=== Musical style and themes ===
Destiny's Child primarily recorded R&B material, with works that incorporated elements of hip-hop, dance, and pop. In the group's original lineup, Beyoncé was the lead vocalist, Rowland was the second lead vocalist, Luckett took on soprano parts, and Roberson sang alto. Beyoncé continued as the primary lead vocalist in the final trio lineup, though Rowland and Williams also alternated lead vocals on many tracks. The group frequently harmonized, particularly on ballads, with each member typically taking a verse and joining together on the chorus. On their album Survivor, all three members sang lead on most tracks. In most of the songs from Destiny Fulfilled, the verses are divided into three sections, with Beyoncé singing first, followed by Rowland, then Williams; the three harmonize together during the choruses.

Members of Destiny's Child cited R&B music artists such as Janet Jackson, En Vogue, and TLC as some of their key influences. The New York Times's Ann Powers described their music as "fresh and emotional", deeming their mixes the "best", their samples the "savviest", and their beats the "most happening". Jon Pareles, writing for the same publication, said that a defining sound of the group is "the way [their] melodies jump in and out of double-time. Above brittle, syncopated rhythm tracks, quickly articulated verses alternate with smoother choruses". In 2001, Beyoncé said: "Everybody is a part of the music [...] everybody is singing lead on every song, and it's so great—because now Destiny's Child is at the point vocally and mentally that it should be at." The group explored themes like women's empowerment in songs such as "Independent Women" and "Survivor", but have also been criticized for the anti-feminist message of songs like "Cater 2 U" and "Nasty Girl".

Survivor features themes interpreted as addressing the group's internal conflicts. The lyrics of the title track—particularly the lines "I'm not gonna blast you on the radio ... I'm not gonna lie on you or your family ... I'm not gonna hate you in the magazine"—prompted Roberson and Luckett to file a lawsuit, alleging that the song violated the non-disparagement terms of their earlier settlement. In response, Beyoncé explained: "The lyrics to the single 'Survivor' are Destiny's Child's story because we've been through a lot ... We went through our drama with the members ... Any complications we've had in our 10-year period of time have made us closer and tighter and better." Another track, "Fancy", which includes the lyrics "You always tried to compete with me, girl ... find your own identity", was interpreted by Entertainment Weekly critic David Browne as another response to the legal dispute.

=== Public image ===
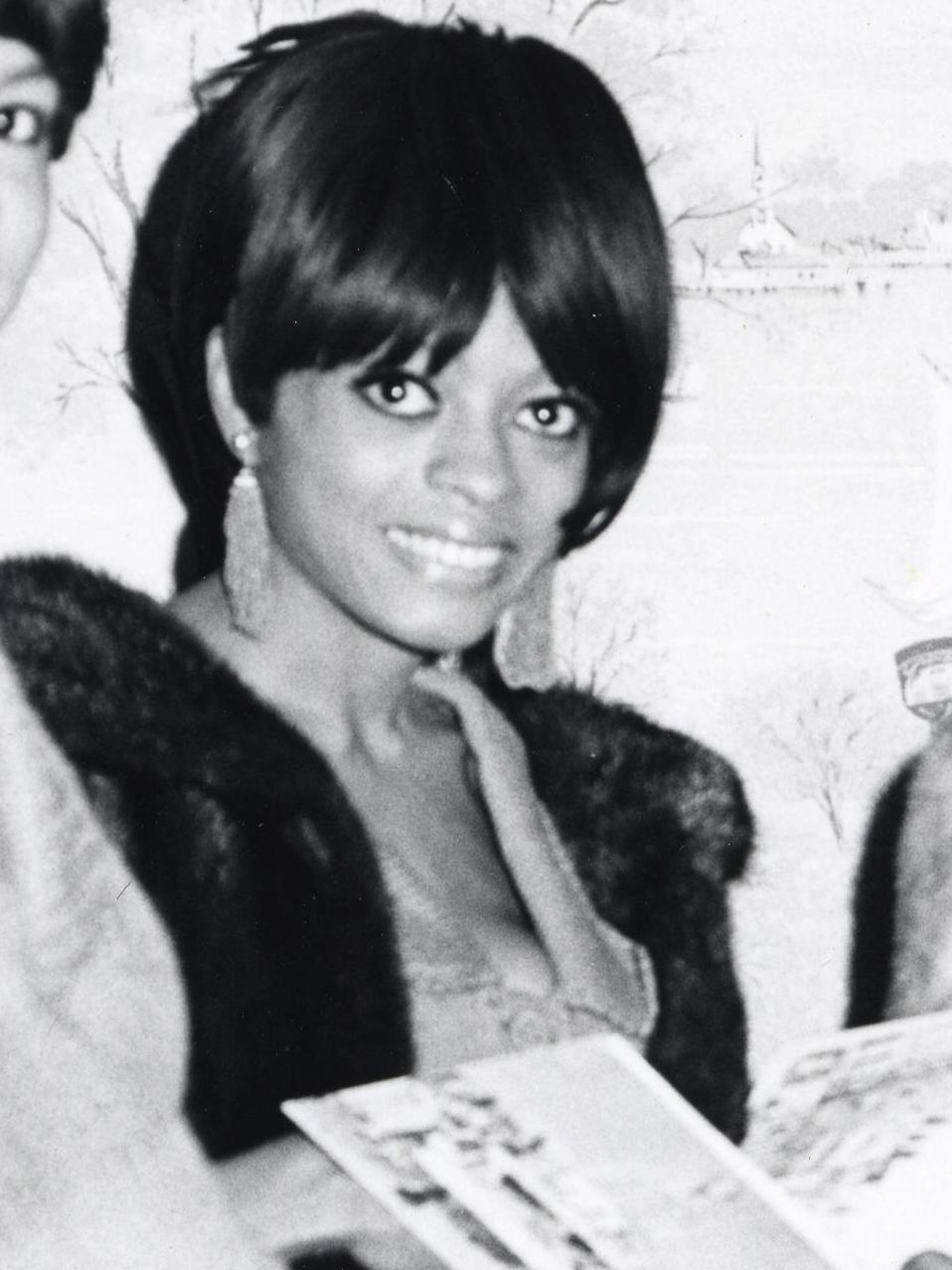
Diana Ross (pictured), lead singer of The Supremes, to whom Beyoncé was compared

Destiny's Child were frequently compared to the Supremes, a 1960s American female vocal group, and Beyoncé was often likened to its frontwoman, Diana Ross; Beyoncé has rejected the comparison. The comparison was popularized when she portrayed Deena Jones—the lead singer of the Dreams, a group modeled on the Supremes—in the 2006 film adaptation of the 1981 Broadway musical Dreamgirls. As Beyoncé took on a large role during the creation of Survivor, Gil Kaufman of MTV News stated that "it became clear that Beyoncé was emerging as [Destiny Child]'s unequivocal musical leader and public face". Her extensive creative influence led to the album being regarded as "very much her work" by Browne. Lola Ogunnaike, writing for The New York Times, said that the longstanding industry perception "that Destiny's Child was little more than a launching pad for Beyoncé Knowles' inevitable solo career".

Following the release of Beyoncé's debut solo album Dangerously in Love (2003), speculation grew that Destiny's Child might disband, as each member had achieved individual success and was pursuing separate projects. Observers drew parallels to Justin Timberlake, who did not return to NSYNC after the success of his solo debut Justified (2002). Rowland refuted the breakup rumors in 2004, confirming that the group had reunited in the studio. The members maintained that their reunion was inevitable and that their close bond had kept them unified. Margeaux Watson, arts editor at Suede magazine, suggested that Beyoncé "does not want to appear disloyal to her former partners", characterizing her return to the group as "a charitable one". Beyoncé's mother, Tina, authored the 2002 book Destiny's Style: Bootylicious Fashion, Beauty and Lifestyle Secrets From Destiny's Child, an account of how fashion influenced Destiny's Child's success.

== Legacy and recognition ==
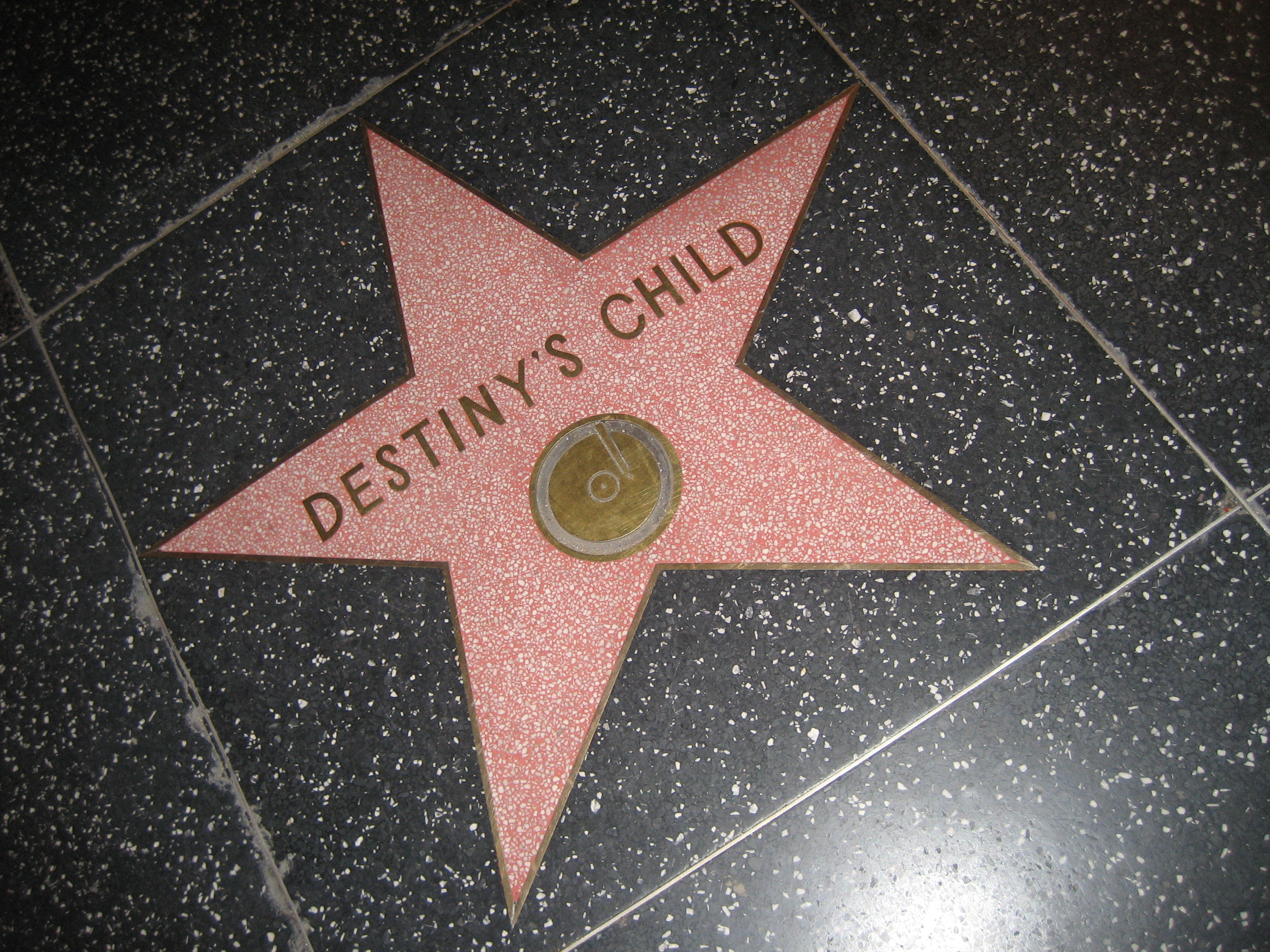
Destiny's Child's star on the Hollywood Walk of Fame

Destiny's Child has sold more than 60 million records worldwide, making them one of the best-selling girl groups of all time. Following the group's disbandment, MTV News writer James Montgomery said that "they have left a fairly sizable legacy behind" as "one of the best-selling female pop vocal groups in history". Billboard declared that Destiny's Child were "defined by a combination of feisty female empowerment anthems, killer dance moves and an enviable fashion sense", while Essence stated that they "set trends with their harmonious music and cutting-edge style".

In 2015, Dazed's Daisy Jones wrote that the group made a significant impact on R&B, stating: "Without a hint of rose tint, Destiny's Child legitimately transformed the sound of R&B forever [...] their distinct influence can be found peppered all over today's pop landscape". In an article for The Cut, Nicole Marrow argued that R&B in the 1990s and early 2000s "was virtually redefined by the success of powerhouse performers like [...] Destiny's Child, who preached a powerful litany of embracing womanhood and celebrating individuality". Writing for Pitchfork, Katherine St. Asaph noticed how Destiny's Child largely influenced the resurgence of girl groups similar to the Supremes in the early-to-mid-1990s:

There is no better microcosm of what happened to Top 40 music between 1993 and 1999 than this. Bands like the Star Search winner were buried in a landfill of post-grunge, while R&B groups built out from soul and quiet storm to create a sound innovative enough to earn the "futuristic" label almost everything got in that pre-Y2K time. This bore itself out in the revival in the early-to-mid-'90s of excellent girl groups vaguely in the Supremes mold—TLC, En Vogue, SWV—but it would be Destiny's Child who would become their true successors.

Destiny's Child won three Grammy Awards, eleven Billboard Music Awards, five American Music Awards, and two MTV Video Music Awards. On March 28, 2006, they became the 2,035th recipient of a star on the Hollywood Walk of Fame. Destiny's Child's final trio lineup has been regarded as the group's most definitive and successful. "Independent Women" was acknowledged by the Guinness World Records as the longest-running number-one song on the Billboard Hot 100 by a girl group. Rolling Stone included their single "Say My Name" in its list of the "500 Greatest Songs of All Time" and their album The Writing's on the Wall amongst the "500 Greatest Albums of All Time". In 2012, VH1 featured Destiny's Child on its "100 Greatest Women in Music" list.

The term "bootylicious"—a portmanteau of booty and delicious—was popularized by Destiny's Child's single of the same name and was subsequently added to the Oxford English Dictionary in 2006. During the 2000s, the term was also frequently applied to Beyoncé in reference to her curvaceous figure. Destiny's Child was honored at the 2005 World Music Awards as the World's Best-Selling Female Group of All Time; the show featured a seventeen-minute tribute performance by Patti LaBelle, Usher, Babyface, Rihanna, Amerie, and Teairra Mari. Billboard named them one of the greatest musical trios of all time and ranked them as the third most successful girl group in chart history, behind TLC and the Supremes. The magazine ranked Destiny's Child at number seventeen on its list of the "Top 100 Women Artists of the 21st Century" (2025).

Destiny's Child has been cited as a musical influence or source of inspiration by several musical acts, such as Rihanna, Lady Gaga, Meghan Trainor, Fifth Harmony, Little Mix, Girls Aloud, Haim, Katy B, and RichGirl. Ciara said that she was motivated to pursue a music career after watching the group perform on television. Ariana Grande has similarly identified Destiny's Child as one of her primary vocal inspirations, stating that their music helped her discover her vocal range and "learned about harmonies[,] runs and ad-libs". Trainor has said that her 2016 single "No" was influenced by the late-1990s and early-2000s sounds of artists including Destiny's Child. Fifth Harmony has named Destiny's Child as their biggest inspiration, paying homage to the group with a medley of "Say My Name", "Independent Women", "Bootylicious", and "Survivor" on the television program Greatest Hits.

== Discography ==
- Destiny's Child (1998)
- The Writing's on the Wall (1999)
- Survivor (2001)
- 8 Days of Christmas (2001)
- Destiny Fulfilled (2004)

== Members ==
=== Final members ===
- Beyoncé – vocals (1990–2006, 2013, 2018, 2025)
- Kelly Rowland – vocals (1992–2006, 2013, 2018, 2025)
- Michelle Williams – vocals (2000–2006, 2013, 2018, 2025)

=== Former members ===
- LaTavia Roberson – vocals (1990–2000)
- Támar Davis – vocals (1990–1993)
- Nina Taylor – vocals (1990–1993)
- Nikki Taylor – vocals (1990–1993)
- LeToya Luckett – vocals (1993–2000)
- Farrah Franklin – vocals (2000)

== Tours ==
Headlining

- Destiny's Child World Tour (2002)
- Destiny Fulfilled... and Lovin' It (2005)

Co-headlining

- Total Request Live Tour (with 3LW, Dream, Jessica Simpson, City High, Eve and Nelly with the St. Lunatics) (2001)

Opening act

- SWV World Tour (opened for SWV) (1996)
- Evolution Tour (opened for Boyz II Men) (1998)
- FanMail Tour (opened for TLC) (1999)
- Introducing IMx Tour (opened for IMx) (2000)
- Christina Aguilera in Concert (opened for Christina Aguilera) (2000)
- (You Drive Me) Crazy Tour (opened for Britney Spears for one show) (2000)

== See also ==
- List of best-selling girl groups

== Print sources ==
- Cobbs, Elizabeth (2023). "Chapter 8: The Right to Physical Safety / 2000 to the Present Beyoncé Knowles-Carter and the Women of #MeToo". Fearless Women. Harvard University Press. pp. 317–360. doi:10.4159/9780674293335-009. ISBN 978-0-674-29333-5.
- Elliott, Alan (2022). Dreams That Built America. Thomas Nelson. ISBN 978-0-7852-9699-7.
- Govan, Chloe (September 19, 2012). From Destiny & Beyond: The Kelly Rowland Story. Omnibus Press. ISBN 978-0-85712-794-5.
- Griffiths, Katie (2017). Beyoncé. Cavendish Square Publishing. ISBN 978-1-5026-2705-6.
- Hoffmann, Frank (2004). Encyclopedia of Recorded Sound. Taylor & Francis. ISBN 978-1-135-94950-1.
- Kooijman, Jaap (2019). "Fierce, Fabulous, and In/Famous: Beyoncé as Black Diva". Popular Music and Society. 42 (1): 6–21. doi:10.1080/03007766.2019.1555888. ISSN 0300-7766.
- McCaffrey, Meg (November 2004). "'Bootylicious' Shakes Up OED". School Library Journal. 50 (11). ISSN 0362-8930.
- Phillips, Stephanie (2021). Why Solange Matters. Faber & Faber. ISBN 978-0-571-36899-0.
- Pointer, Anna (2014). Beyoncé: Running the World. Hodder & Stoughton. ISBN 978-1-4736-0732-3. OCLC 893327856.
- Smith, Jessie (2010). Encyclopedia of African American Popular Culture. Bloomsbury Publishing. ISBN 978-0-313-35797-8.
- Stoute, Steve (2011). The Tanning of America. Penguin Books. ISBN 978-1-101-52911-9.
- Taraborrelli, J. Randy (2015). Becoming Beyoncé: The Untold Story. Grand Central Publishing. ISBN 978-1-4555-9034-6.
- Vignola, Nicole (2024). Rewire. Random House. ISBN 978-1-4059-5899-8.
