= Mathew Knowles =

American music executive (born 1952)

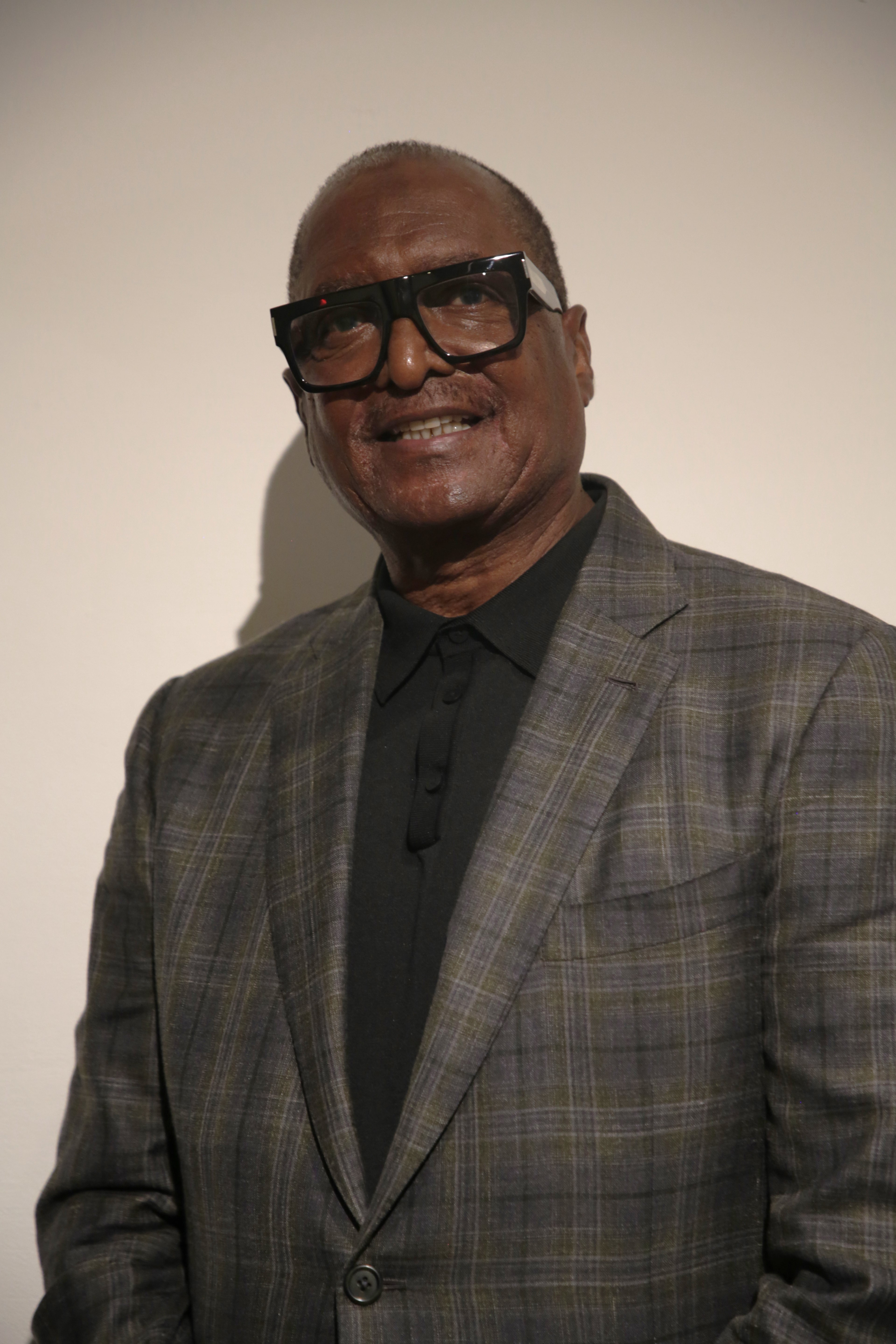
- Knowles at Black Week 2025 in NYC.
- Born: January 9, 1952 (age 74); Gadsden, Alabama, U.S.
- Education: Fisk University (BA, BSBA)
- Occupations: College professor; author; businessman; record executive; music manager; record producer
- Years active: 1975–present
- Spouses: Tina Beyoncé (m. 1980; div. 2011); Gena C. Avery (m. 2013)
- Children: 4, including Beyoncé and Solange
- Relatives: Blue Ivy Carter (granddaughter)
- Musical career
- Label: Music World
- Website: mathewknowles.com

Mathew Knowles (born January 9, 1952) is an American record executive, businessman and university lecturer. He is best known for being the manager of Destiny's Child. He also once managed the solo careers of his daughters Beyoncé and Solange Knowles.

Knowles is the founder of Music World Entertainment, which embraces country, gospel and children's music.

== Early life and education ==
Knowles was born in Gadsden, Alabama, the son of Lou Helen (née Hogue) and Matthew Q. Knowles. In 1958, at the age of six, he integrated a Catholic elementary school. He continued his education as a pioneer for desegregation until college, being among the first Black students to attend the University of Tennessee at Chattanooga (UTC) from 1970 to 1972. While at UTC, he pursued studies in business administration and was an active student. He played as a guard/forward on the UTC Mocs basketball team during the 1971–72 season, where they achieved a 20–7 record.

Following his sophomore year, Knowles transferred to Fisk University, a historically Black college in Nashville, Tennessee, where he was a member of the Omega Psi Phi fraternity and earned both a Bachelor of Arts degree in Economics and a Bachelor of Science degree in Business Administration. He also has an MBA in Strategic Planning and Organizational Culture and a Ph.D. from Cornerstone Christian Bible College.

== Career ==
Knowles began his business career in the sales of office and medical equipment. He moved to Houston in 1976 and worked for the Xerox Corporation for 10 years, primarily in the medical systems sales division. In 1988, Knowles worked for Philips, selling CT/MRI diagnostic imaging equipment to hospitals and health facilities. He also later worked in neurosurgical sales at Johnson & Johnson. In 1992, Knowles left this career to devote himself to his music company, Music World Entertainment, which he founded that year.

Knowles established several recording imprints under Music World Entertainment, including Music World Gospel, Music World Kids, and Music World Country/Compadre. Knowles also established joint ventures with Sony Music, Interscope/Geffen/A&M, Fontana/Universal, Integrity Africa, Fontana International, and Sony Brazil.

Knowles became manager of the vocal group Destiny's Child, working as either a producer or an executive producer on many of the group's projects. By 1997 he had secured the group a label deal with Columbia Records and a feature on the Men in Black soundtrack. During this time, Knowles brought in producers such as Wyclef Jean, Jermaine Dupri, and Master P to focus on a fusion of hip hop with R&B to cross over to different audiences. Under Music World Artist Management, Destiny's Child became a top-selling group, winning several awards including Grammy Awards, American Music Awards, BET Awards, and many others. Billboard magazine inducted the group into the All Time Hot 100 Artists. Knowles also managed the solo careers of Destiny's Child members Michelle Williams and Kelly Rowland. Former members LeToya Luckett and LaTavia Roberson once sued Knowles, accusing him of misappropriating group funds.

In 2002, Knowles founded Spirit Rising Music, which became Music World Gospel. Its artists include Vanessa Bell Armstrong, Brian Courtney Wilson, Juanita Bynum, Le'Andria Johnson, Micah Stampley, Amber Bullock, Andrea Helms, Trinitee 5:7, and Elder Goldwire. In 2016, through Music World Music, Knowles acquired the country music catalog Compadre, which includes James McMurty, Johnny Cash, Billy Joe Shaver, Trent Willmon, and Kate Campbell. Knowles also launched the family-oriented music imprint, Music World Kids. The label has released youth projects that include Baby Jamz, Krazy Kuzins, Kid's Rap Radio, and the Music World Kids CD 5-pack. The venture also released music from Nickelodeon's cartoon series, Wow! Wow! Wubbzy!.

In addition to his work in music, Knowles was one of the executive producers of the 2009 movie Obsessed, which starred Beyoncé. He was also executive producer of, and was featured in, two reality series: The UK's Chancers, and MTV International's Breaking from Above.

In 2015, Mathew Knowles released his first book, The DNA of Achievers: 10 Traits of Highly Successful Professionals. In an interview with Madamenoire.com, he spoke about teaching entrepreneurship on the college level, and his entertainment industry seminar where he taught music executives like Van Benson and other successful students.

In 2018, Knowles joined the advisory board of Tunedly, an online recording studio for songwriters. In 2019, he joined the cannabis and real-estate firm Bangi as its chief marketing officer. That same year, he released Destiny's Child: The Untold Story Presents Girls Tyme, an album featuring then-unreleased music from Destiny's Child's childhood days as Girls Tyme. The album's release was also accompanied by a book, Destiny's Child: The Untold Story, written by Knowles.

In 2021, Knowles launched his iHeartRadio podcast "Mathew Knowles Impact" and revealed his plans to retire from the music industry. In 2022, Knowles sold Music World Entertainment Group to APX Capital Group. Upon signing this deal, he became a member of APX's board of directors, and the manager of a $275 million fund for film and television co-productions between the United States and Italy. One of the first projects under the agreement, The Mathew Knowles Story, will tell the story of how Knowles guided Destiny's Child to success, while also giving a behind-the-scenes look at the solo careers of his daughters Beyoncé and Solange, as well as Michelle Williams and Kelly Rowland.

== Teaching ==
Knowles is a visiting professor at Texas Southern University, where he teaches courses on the entertainment industry in the School of Communications. In 2018, the university established the Mathew Knowles Institute in his honor. He currently holds a professorship at University of Houston, Prairie View A&M University, and the Art Institute. Knowles joined the teaching staff at London College of Contemporary Music as a visiting professor. In 2022, a bursary scholarship was established in his name.

== Personal life ==
Knowles married Tina Beyoncé in 1980. She filed for divorce in 2009, dropped the matter in 2010, then refiled in August 2011, stating "discord or conflict of personalities" that prevented them from "reasonable expectation of reconciliation" as the reason. The divorce was finalized in November 2011.

On June 30, 2013, he married Gena Avery, a former model.

Knowles was successfully treated for male breast cancer in 2019.
