= Lose My Breath =

2004 single by Destiny's Child

Single by Destiny's Child

from the album Destiny Fulfilled
- B-side: "Why You Actin'"; "Game Over"
- Released: September 9, 2004
- Recorded: 2004
- Studio: Sony (New York)
- Genre: R&B; dance-pop
- Length: 4:01
- Label: Columbia
- Songwriters: Beyoncé Knowles; Kelly Rowland; Michelle Williams; Rodney Jerkins; Fred Jerkins III; Sean Garrett; LaShawn Daniels; Shawn Carter
- Producers: Darkchild; Beyoncé Knowles

Destiny's Child singles chronology
"Nasty Girl" (2002)	"Lose My Breath" (2004)	"Soldier" (2004)

Music video
- "Lose My Breath" on YouTube

"Lose My Breath" is a song recorded by American group Destiny's Child for their fifth and final studio album Destiny Fulfilled (2004). It was written by Beyoncé, Kelly Rowland, Michelle Williams, Rodney Jerkins, LaShawn Daniels, Fred Jerkins III, Sean Garrett and Jay-Z. The song was partially developed by Jerkins before being presented to Destiny's Child; its chorus was afterwards rewritten by Jay-Z. An uptempo R&B and dance-pop song, "Lose My Breath" has a marching, military percussion-led instrumentation with different sound effects in its backing track. The song was released as the lead single from Destiny Fulfilled on September 9, 2004, by Columbia Records.

"Lose My Breath" received positive reviews from music critics, who generally praised its melody and instrumentation. The song further received a Grammy Award nomination in the category for Best R&B Vocal Performance by a Duo or Group. "Lose My Breath" was commercially successful, peaking at number three on the US Billboard Hot 100 and reaching the top spot on numerous international charts, as well as appearing within the top ten in almost every country it charted in.

The song's accompanying music video was directed by Marc Klasfeld and filmed in Los Angeles, California. It featured Destiny's Child performing dance choreographies portraying three different sets of characters. The song was performed during the group's tour Destiny Fulfilled... and Lovin' It (2005) and on numerous televised appearances and awards ceremonies in 2004 and 2005. The American Broadcasting Company (ABC) used "Lose My Breath" as the official song for the NBA playoffs in 2004 and 2005.

== Writing and production ==
"Lose My Breath" was written by Beyoncé, Kelly Rowland, Michelle Williams, Rodney "Darkchild" Jerkins, Fred Jerkins, Sean Garrett, LaShawn Daniels and Jay-Z. The production of the song was handled by Jerkins, Beyoncé, Rowland and Garrett. Record producer Jerkins, who had previously collaborated with the group for "Say My Name" (2000), had worked on "Lose My Breath" without informing Destiny's Child. Beyoncé and Williams heard the drum instrumentation of the track and they enjoyed it with the latter feeling that the song was nothing like the mainstream radio sound. They went to their bandmate Kelly Rowland presenting the song.

Alongside Jerkins, the group asked for help from American rapper Jay-Z who immediately created a chorus including the lines "Can you keep up" without hearing the track. The group took his chorus and wrote the verses and bridge around it. During an interview with Complex, Garrett recalled the time he worked with Williams on the song, saying: "There was so much magic going on in the studio. We probably recorded all the songs in about a month and every day it was a new song coming out. 'Lose My Breath' was towards the latter part of the album and that was an amazing song that we felt could not only be big on the radio but big with bands and marching bands. I was on a natural high after that."

== Music and lyrics ==
"Lose My Breath"
25-second sample of "Lose My Breath", a song which was described as an "aphrodisiac and a challenge" at the same time. The members of the group are heard repeating the chorus lines "Can you keep up?" over a throbbing beat.

"Lose My Breath" is an uptempo R&B and dance-pop song with elements of dancehall music. It is performed with a brightdance beat and a tempo of 120 beats per minute. The song is set in common time, composed in the key of C minor, not E♭ major with the vocal elements spanning from the low note of C_{4} to the high note of D_{5}. The band members' vocals in "Lose My Breath" were described as "breathy". The song features fast snare drum sequences, choppy beats with hand-clappy percussion, cymbal crashes, and itchy hi-hats, creating a military sound reminiscent to a drumline of a marching band. The opening drum sequence is sampled from the drumline of "Taps" performed by the University of Michigan Marching Band. Synthesizer blips are also utilized in the song's melody. Along with those instruments, the complex backing track of the song uses various sound effects such as ripple of claps, stomps, thumps, snare rolls, and gasps.

Lyrically, the female protagonists challenge their male "suitors" to keep up instead of being full of empty promises; the women further feel that "He's not fulfilling you like he says". Williams further explained the meaning of the song during an interview with MTV News, "We've had experiences with men doing a lot of talking but they can’t back it up. You said you could do this, but you can't, whether that's on the dance floor or wherever else. He said what he could do for you, but..." The lyrics are constructed in the chorus-verse pattern. The song opens with the lines "Hit me" and the first verses sung by Beyoncé follow: "I put it right there made it easy for you to get to / Now you want to act like you don't know what to do". The chorus follows during which the group repeatedly sings the lines "Can you keep up?". Rowland's second verses follow where she sings the lines "Put it on me deep in the right direction". The chorus is repeated twice before the bridge by Williams. After the bridge, the group sings the lines "Here's your papers, baby you are dismissed" letting their man know that he is not good enough for them. Rowland sings a short ad lib, and then the trio ends with a repeated chorus. Nick Reynolds from BBC compared the song to Missy Elliott's "Pass That Dutch" and to songs by The Supremes. He further found a name check of Public Enemy's "Bring the Noise". Eric Henderson of Slant Magazine also compared "Lose My Breath with "Pass That Dutch".

== Critical reception ==
Jenny Eliscu of Rolling Stone referred to "Lose My Breath" a "sweat-soaked" track and a "percussive sex romp" where Destiny's Child "pant in time to a marching-band beat." Nick Reynolds of the BBC called the military drumming of the "fantastic" track "exciting" and its keyboard stabs "nasty". A writer for Vibe hailed it as a "pounding, animalistic piece of music – as urgent as a war cry" with a "thunderous tribal beat". In an album review of Destiny Fulfilled, Tom Sinclair of Entertainment Weekly felt that "Lose My Breath" opened the record with "a brisk enough start" and concluded, "While it's no 'Bootylicious,' it's got more nervous energy and verve than almost anything else here". A writer of Billboard magazine felt that the song was "love's exhilarating start". Kelefa Sanneh of The New York Times described it as "suitably calisthenic". AllMusic's Stephen Thomas Erlewine considered the song to be an album highlight. Eric Henderson of Slant Magazine called the song a "thigh-snapper" and said it responsible for the "increased use of paradiddling drumsticks as sex toys". Barbara Ellen of The Observer felt that "Lose My Breath" was "of the exemplary standard" of the band's previous albums, Survivor and The Writing's on the Wall. In his review, Alex MacPherson of Stylus Magazine chose the song as one of the album's best and wrote,

It [Destiny Fulfilled] shoots its load quickly, although just as effectively: "Lose My Breath" and "Soldier" are stunning, both displaying the Beyoncé trademark of creepily submissive lyrics matched with dominatrix vocals and arrangements to superb effect. The former kicks off with a martial beat and a call of "hit me!" which sounds like a military command, and proceeds to put you through a series of moves without pause for breath, Beyoncé and her minions cracking the whip every time you even think of flagging.

The A.V. Club's Andy Battaglia felt that "Lose My Breath" gave the album an "opening charge by way of a raucous marching-band beat and panting attempts to squeeze a lot of words into closing musical corners". Caroline Sullivan of The Guardian described the song as "fantastic, legs-in-the-air". Paul Flynn of the same publication wrote that it "further relegated the other members of Destiny's Child to the position of Beyoncé's backing singers". Tom Breihan of Pitchfork Media who complimented Jerkins's "incredible" drum programming and the "mind-boggling" backing track felt that it lacked a tune: "The vocals are too breathy, too whiny, and too processed, and the song's one thrilling moment-- near the end, where the harmonies get a bit of room to play off each other with ABBA-esque rococo aplomb-- lasts only for a second." Los Angeles Times writer Natalie Nichols deemed its production "nifty" with a "rat-a-tat drum line percussion propelling" but felt that it contained a single hook expanded into an entire song. Lindsey Weber from Vulture criticized Williams' contribution to the bridge, describing it as "weak".

=== Accolades ===
In 2005, "Lose My Breath" was nominated in the category for Best R&B Vocal Performance by a Duo Or Group at the 47th Annual Grammy Awards. At the 23rd Annual ASCAP Pop Music Awards, "Lose My Breath" was recognized as one of the Most Performed Songs in 2005 along with the group's other song "Soldier". Sean Garrett won a BMI Urban Award at the 2006 BMI Awards for the song.

Clem Bastow from Stylus Magazine put "Lose My Breath" at number ten on his list "Top Ten Drum Beats You Are Powerless to Resist". He wrote: "Rodney Jerkins's masterstroke of a production technique... propels this... penultimate... Destiny's Child gem into the stratosphere." The song was ranked at number 39 in the annual Pazz & Jop mass critics poll of the year's best in music in 2004. In 2013, Weber from Vulture included "Lose My Breath" at number 19 on her list of the 25 best songs by the group. Houston Chronicle's Joey Guerra also included the song in his list of the group's best songs, writing that it gave a chance to Rowland and Williams to "shine vocally". The same year, Erika Ramirez and Jason Lipshutz of Billboard magazine put it at number nine on their list of "Beyonce's 30 Biggest Billboard Hits". In 2014, Official Charts Company (OCC) writer Justin Myers listed the song as one of the essential "pop gems" in the UK, praising the group for coming back in 2004 with "classic DC [elements]: super-speedy singing, a frantic beat and dramatic melody".

== Commercial performance ==
Following Destiny's Child's two-year hiatus, "Lose My Breath" was highly anticipated as their comeback release. In the US, it debuted at number 30 on the US Billboard Hot 100 chart dated September 25, 2004, ascending to number 12 the following week, due to being the fastest-growing title regarding airplay. The song reached its peak at number three on October 30, becoming Destiny's Child's ninth top-10 single. It spent a total of 23 weeks on the chart. "Lose My Breath" performed similarly on component Billboard charts, becoming the group's second Dance Club Songs number-one, and reaching numbers three and 10 on the Pop Airplay and Hot R&B/Hip-Hop Songs, respectively. In July 2020, it was certified platinum by the Recording Industry Association of America (RIAA), for combined sales and streaming units of one million in the country.

"Lose My Breath" was also commercially successful in Europe. On the UK Singles Chart, the song debuted and peaked at number two on November 13, 2004, becoming Destiny's Child tenth top-ten on the chart. The single was held from the top by Eminem's "Just Lose It" which sold only 2,000 copies more than "Lose My Breath". The following week, it again stayed at number two, held off by U2's "Vertigo" and went on to spend the next two weeks at number two, held off by "I'll Stand By You" by Girls Aloud. It stayed within the top ten for seven consecutive weeks and spent a total of 11 weeks on the chart. As of September 2014, "Lose My Breath" is the group's third best-selling single in the country, with 340,000 copies sold. The single reached number one in Ireland, Italy, Switzerland, and the Belgian region Flanders. It was certified gold by the Belgian Entertainment Association (BEA) and the International Federation of the Phonographic Industry (IFPI) in Switzerland for sales of 25,000 and 20,000 copies in the countries, respectively. "Lose My Breath" also entered the top ten in ten other countries across Europe. In Germany, it became the band's best-charting single, reaching number three on the singles chart. "Lose My Breath" further peaked at number one on the European Hot 100 Singles chart for the week ending December 4, 2004, spending four consecutive weeks on top until the end of 2004.

Across Oceania, the single had similar reception, debuting at number five on the ARIA Charts in Australia on November 15, 2004. It peaked at number three, three weeks after its debut, and stayed at that position for another week. "Lose My Breath" remained on the chart for a total of 17 weeks, being seen for the last time at number 43 on March 6, 2005. The Australian Recording Industry Association (ARIA) awarded the single with a platinum certification for shipments of 70,000 copies in the country. On the New Zealand Singles Chart, the single debuted at number 16 on November 15, 2004. It spent seven weeks there, peaking at number four in its fourth week on November 29.

== Music video ==
=== Background and synopsis ===
The burgundy and street-styled Destiny's Child groups warm up for dance-off.

The "fierce" Destiny's Child joins in and dances off in front of the two other alter-ego groups at the end.

The music video for "Lose My Breath" was directed by Marc Klasfeld (under the pseudonym of Alan Smithee) and was shot in Los Angeles on October 8, 2004. Destiny's Child had dance rehearsals for the video in late September and continued the following month. During the rehearsals, Beyoncé tore her right hamstring, while overdoing the choreography. Following the injury, she was advised by a specialist to avoid dancing and other physical activities for a week; MTV News further reported that the injury could further postpone the filming of the video. However, the next week, the group revealed in an interview with the publication that the video would be filmed as originally planned as Beyoncé's leg healed fast. She said, "My leg was actually a blessing in disguise because it gave us more time to prepare for the video". Speaking about the concept of the video, Beyoncé revealed

It's really a dance-off between a more sophisticated 'in-fashion' Destiny's Child versus a more 'street' Destiny's Child. And in the end a third Destiny's Child even more fierce takes over. It's a lot of hard work for us because we have to learn three routines for the same song. People will be shocked because it's different for us. They've never seen us really dance.

The video mainly takes place in an alleyway, where the members of Destiny's Child are having a dance-off. As the song opens, it begins with Beyoncé, Williams and Rowland walking, representing the "fierce Destiny's Child" dressed in stilettos and fur. It transitions to the group being dressed in-fashion with red burgundy suits as they meet their identical street-styled, hip hop copies with hoodies and Timberland boots, starting to perform a dance-off; the camera focuses on each member of the group performing a separate choreography with their rival in front of them during their solo lines. As the song progresses, Beyoncé, Williams and Rowland are joined by other male and female dancers at the start of the song's chorus. During her lines, Rowland performs a dance sequence with two male dancers. Following the song's bridge, the two different groups head towards another place where they are welcomed by more dancers and their third "fierce" rivals appear for the final chorus. The video ends in the same way it opened, with the "fierce" group members walking.

=== Release and reception ===
The music video of "Lose My Breath" premiered on MTV's Total Request Live (TRL). It debuted on the video program on October 26, 2004, at number eight remaining for 36 days. On Muchmusic's Top 30 countdown, the video debuted on November 6, 2004, at number 26. It peaked at number seven on January 15, 2005, stayed there for another week, and charted for a total of twelve weeks. The music video was featured on the DualDisc editions of the albums #1's and Destiny Fulfilled as well as on the bonus DVD of the Destiny Fulfilled Tour edition. It was also included on the Destiny's Child Video Anthology, a video anthology album released in 2013.

Erika Ramirez and Jason Lipshutz writing on behalf of Billboard magazine felt that Destiny's Child "came back strong after a three-year hiatus, showing off their dance skills in the video" for "Lose My Breath". Jess Harvell of the website Pitchfork Media criticized the "weird mink stole" Beyoncé wore in the clip. A writer of People felt that the group borrowed from their old looks for their outfits in the video "glammed up in stilettos and fur". Justin Myers from the Official Charts Company considered it to be a proof that the group was back in 2004, and showed them being "totally kick-ass – so pretty autobiographical". The music video was nominated for the Best Dance Video category at the 2005 MTV Video Music Awards, but lost to Missy Elliott's "Lose Control" (2005). In 2014, The Guardian editor Michael Cragg ranked the video for "Lose My Breath" in his list of the ten best videos by Beyoncé. He remarked that the clip featured bigger budget than the group's previous visual efforts and praised the concept, saying, "It's a simple idea executed perfectly, especially when Beyoncé gives herself side-eye, flicks her hair and then watches while one of the other Beyoncé's dances like a creature possessed."

== Live performances ==
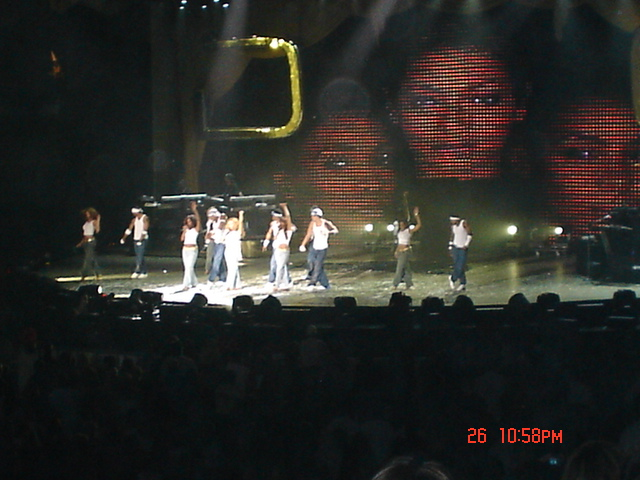
Destiny's Child performing "Lose My Breath" in 2005 during a stop of Destiny Fulfilled ... And Lovin' It.

The first live performance of "Lose My Breath" was during the opening of the 2004 NFL season on September 9 for which Destiny's Child was surrounded by smoke from fog machines. Chicago Tribune writer Chris Malcolm reported, "I think what I love most is the blank look on some of the hard-core Boston football fans who showed up early to watch kickers practice and instead got a live version of 'Lose My Breath.'" On October 25, 2004, the group performed "Lose My Breath" during the Radio Music Awards in Las Vegas, Nevada starting with an a cappella jazz harmony. Destiny's Child appeared on The Oprah Winfrey Show in November 2004 where they closed their performance with a rendition of the song. On November 8, 2004, the trio appeared on Total Request Live (TRL) and performed the song along with "Say My Name". They went to the German entertainment TV show Wetten, dass..? on November 13, 2004, performing "Lose My Breath". The group "Soldier" and "Lose My Breath" at the 2005 NBA All-Star Game on February 20, 2005. They performed the song again at the 2005 ESPY Awards on July 13 with the ceremony being aired on ESPN four days later. Destiny's Child performed "Lose My Breath" at the Fashion Rocks benefit concert at New York's Radio City Music Hall in February 2006 which marked their last televised appearance as a group.

In 2005, the song was part of the set list of the group's tour Destiny Fulfilled... and Lovin' It where it was performed during the concert's encore. The singers wore white T-shirts and jeans and during the end of the performance went under cascading water on stage. While reviewing a show by the group in the UK, Adenike Adenitire writing for MTV News found the performance to be somehow casual: "It was like watching three young girls and their friends practicing their moves at a slumber party. It was a perfect note of DC harmony to end a night that celebrated both the group and the individuals within it." Barbara Ellen from The Observer felt that the song worked as a "stupendous encore". The song was included on the track listing of the group's live album Live in Atlanta (2006) chronicling a concert from the tour. Beyoncé performed "Lose My Breath" at the 2007 Houston Livestock Show and Rodeo on March 15 as part of a Destiny's Child medley during the concert.

== Cover versions and usage in media ==
Rihanna, Teairra Marí and Amerie performed "Lose My Breath" at the 2005 World Music Awards on August 31 as a tribute to Destiny's Child. Starting with the Christmas Day 2004 Miami Heat-Los Angeles Lakers telecast, the American Broadcasting Company (ABC) used the song as the music for their introductory montage for the 2004 NBA Playoffs. The song was used through the rest of the regular season, and through the first few weeks of the 2005 NBA Playoffs. During that time, it also served as part of many commercials until the playoffs. In February 2015, "Lose My Breath" was performed by Josie Totah in "Child Star", the ninth episode of Glee's sixth and final season.

== Formats and track listings ==
UK CD single 1

1. "Lose My Breath" (Album Version) – 4:02
2. "Why You Actin'" – 4:29

UK CD single 2

1. "Lose My Breath" (Album Version) – 4:02
2. "Lose My Breath" (Maurice's Nu Soul Mix) – 5:54
3. "Lose My Breath" (Paul Johnson's Club Mix) – 6:07

Maxi CD single

1. "Lose My Breath" (Album Version) – 4:02
2. "Lose My Breath" (Maurice's Nu Soul Mix) – 5:54
3. "Lose My Breath" (Paul Johnson's Club Mix) – 6:07
4. "Why You Actin'" – 4:29

US CD single

1. "Lose My Breath" (Album Version) – 4:02
2. "Game Over" – 4:05

German Pock It-CD (3-inch)

1. "Lose My Breath" (Album Version) – 4:02
2. "Lose My Breath" (Paul Johnson's Club Mix) – 6:07

== Credits and personnel ==
Credits are adapted from the liner notes of Destiny Fulfilled.

- Lead vocals: Beyoncé Knowles, Kelly Rowland, Michelle Williams
- Vocal production: Beyoncé Knowles, Kelly Rowland, Sean Garrett
- Recorded by: Jeff Villanueva, Jim Caruna at Sony Music Studios, New York City
- Audio mixing by: Tony Maserati
- Master recording by: Tom Coyne
- Introduction by: Michigan Marching Band Drumline

== Charts ==
=== Weekly charts ===
2004–2005 weekly chart performance
Chart (2004–2005)	Peak position
Australia (ARIA)	3
Australian Urban (ARIA)	1
Austria (Ö3 Austria Top 40)	8
Belgium (Ultratop 50 Flanders)	1
Belgium (Ultratop 50 Wallonia)	3
Canada CHR/Pop Top 30 (Radio & Records)	1
Canada Hot AC Top 30 (Radio & Records)	10
CIS Airplay (TopHit)	9
Croatia International Airplay (Top lista)	2
Denmark (Tracklisten)	4
European Hot 100 Singles (Billboard)	1
Finland (Suomen virallinen lista)	3
France (SNEP)	8
Germany (GfK)	3
Greece (IFPI)	4
Hungary (Rádiós Top 40)	34
Hungary (Dance Top 40)	20
Ireland (IRMA)	1
Italy (FIMI)	3
Netherlands (Dutch Top 40)	4
Netherlands (Single Top 100)	5
New Zealand (Recorded Music NZ)	4
Norway (VG-lista)	2
Romania (Romanian Top 100)	4
Russia Airplay (TopHit)	5
Scottish Singles Sales (Official Charts)	2
Spain (Promusicae)	2
Sweden (Sverigetopplistan)	8
Switzerland (Schweizer Hitparade)	1
UK Singles (Official Charts)	2
UK Hip Hop/R&B (Official Charts)	1
UK Airplay (Music Week)	1
Ukraine Airplay (TopHit) DJ Anderstanding remix	180
US Billboard Hot 100	3
US Dance Club Songs (Billboard) Remixes	1
US Dance Singles Sales (Billboard) with "Soldier"	2
US Dance Airplay (Billboard)	1
US Hot R&B/Hip-Hop Songs (Billboard)	10
US Pop Airplay (Billboard)	3
US Rhythmic Airplay (Billboard)	4

2016 weekly chart performance
Chart (2016)	Peak position
Ukraine Airplay (TopHit) DJ Anderstanding remix	65

=== Year-end charts ===
2004 year-end chart performance
Chart (2004)	Position
Australia (ARIA)	43
Australian Urban (ARIA)	20
Belgium (Ultratop 50 Flanders)	40
Belgium (Ultratop 50 Wallonia)	61
CIS Airplay (TopHit)	127
France (SNEP)	70
Germany (Media Control GfK)	62
Ireland (IRMA)	18
Italy (FIMI)	39
Netherlands (Dutch Top 40)	68
Netherlands (Single Top 100)	71
Russia Airplay (TopHit)	62
Sweden (Hitlistan)	70
Switzerland (Schweizer Hitparade)	38
UK Singles (OCC)	15
UK Airplay (Music Week)	32
UK Urban (Music Week)	10
US Billboard Hot 100	58
US Hot R&B/Hip-Hop Singles & Tracks (Billboard)	80
US Mainstream Top 40 (Billboard)	49
US Rhythmic Top 40 (Billboard)	50

2005 year-end chart performance
Chart (2005)	Position
Australia (ARIA)	58
Belgium (Ultratop 50 Flanders)	59
Brazil (Crowley)	78
CIS Airplay (TopHit)	138
European Hot 100 Singles (Billboard)	32
Romania (Romanian Top 100)	41
Russia Airplay (TopHit)	124
Switzerland (Schweizer Hitparade)	21
US Billboard Hot 100	86
US Dance Club Play (Billboard)	4
US Dance Singles Sales (Billboard)	6
US Hot Dance Airplay (Billboard)	15
US Hot R&B/Hip-Hop Songs (Billboard)	100
US Mainstream Top 40 (Billboard)	47
US Rhythmic Top 40 (Billboard)	70

== Certifications ==
Certifications and sales for "Lose My Breath"
Region	Certification	Certified units/sales
Australia (ARIA)	Platinum	70,000^{^}
Belgium (BRMA)	Gold	25,000^{*}
Brazil (Pro-Música Brasil) Homecoming version	Gold	20,000^{‡}
France (SNEP)	Gold	250,000^{*}
Germany (BVMI)	Gold	150,000^{‡}
Japan (RIAJ) Ringtone	2× Platinum	500,000^{*}
Japan (RIAJ) Full-length ringtone	Gold	100,000^{*}
New Zealand (RMNZ)	Platinum	30,000^{‡}
Switzerland (IFPI Switzerland)	Gold	20,000^{^}
United Kingdom (BPI)	Platinum	600,000^{‡}
United States (RIAA)	Platinum	1,000,000^{‡}
United States (RIAA) Mastertone	Gold	500,000^{*}
^{*} Sales figures based on certification alone.^{^} Shipments figures based on certification alone.^{‡} Sales+streaming figures based on certification alone.

== Release history ==
Release dates and formats for "Lose My Breath"
Region	Date	Format(s)	Label(s)	Ref.
United States	September 9, 2004	Streaming (Note: AOL exclusive)	Columbia	
United States	October 5, 2004	Digital download (Note: Prior to being widely released for digital download on October 5, "Lose My Breath" was briefly available for digital download exclusively via Walmart.)	Columbia	
Australia	October 29, 2004	Maxi CD	Sony BMG	
United Kingdom	November 1, 2004	12-inch vinyl; CD; maxi CD	Columbia	
France	November 2, 2004	CD; maxi CD	Columbia	
United States	November 2, 2004	12-inch vinyl; CD	Columbia; Sony Urban	
Germany	November 8, 2004	Maxi CD	Sony BMG	
United States	December 7, 2004	Digital download (EP) (Note: "Lose My Breath" was made available in two digital EP variants, with one including three remixes of the song, and the other additionally including two versions of "Soldier".)	Columbia	

== See also ==
- List of number-one dance airplay hits of 2004 (U.S.)
- List of number-one dance airplay hits of 2005 (U.S.)
- List of number-one dance singles of 2005 (U.S.)
- Ultratop 50 number-one hits of 2004
- List of European number-one hits of 2004
- List of number-one singles of 2004 (Ireland)
- List of number-one hits of 2004 (Switzerland)
