= Cater 2 U =

2005 single by Destiny's Child

Single by Destiny's Child

from the album Destiny Fulfilled
- B-side: "Girl"
- Released: June 7, 2005
- Recorded: 2004
- Studio: Sony (New York City)
- Genre: R&B
- Length: 4:07
- Label: Columbia
- Songwriters: Rodney Jerkins; Beyoncé Knowles; Ricky Lewis; Kelly Rowland; Robert Waller; Michelle Williams
- Producers: Darkchild; Ric Rude; Beyoncé Knowles

Destiny's Child singles chronology
"Girl" (2005)	"Cater 2 U" (2005)	"Stand Up for Love" (2005)

Music video
- "Cater 2 U" on YouTube

"Cater 2 U" is a song recorded by American group Destiny's Child for their fifth and final studio album Destiny Fulfilled (2004). The song was written by group members Beyoncé, Kelly Rowland and Michelle Williams along with Rodney "Darkchild" Jerkins, Ricky "Ric Rude" Lewis and Robert Waller, with Beyoncé, Rude and Jerkins handling its production. An R&B ballad talking about a woman's desire to cater to the male love interest of her life, "Cater 2 U" contains synthesizers in its instrumentation. A lawsuit filled by singer-songwriter Ricky Allen in 2006 claimed the group only recorded a cover of the song, which was originally his; however, the case was settled in 2009.

"Cater 2 U" was released as the fourth and final single from Destiny Fulfilled on June 7, 2005, by Columbia Records and Sony Urban Music. It received mixed reviews from music critics who, despite generally praising its composition and the group members' vocal performances, criticized the lyrical content. The song was nominated in two categories at the 48th Annual Grammy Awards (2006) and received an award for Best R&B/Soul Single, Group, Band or Duo at the 2006 Soul Train Music Awards. Commercially, it peaked at number 14 on the US Billboard Hot 100, being certified platinum by the Recording Industry Association of America (RIAA).

The accompanying music video for the song was directed by Jake Nava and filmed at the Red Rock Canyon State Park in California. It features the trio at a desert, with each member singing at a separate set and later a choreographed dance during the chorus. To further promote "Cater 2 U", Destiny's Child performed the song during several televised appearances and at the 2005 BET Awards. In addition, "Cater 2 U" was added to the set list of Destiny's Child's final tour Destiny Fulfilled... and Lovin' It (2005). Both Beyoncé and Kelly Rowland performed the song during their solo tours after Destiny's Child's disbandment. A cover version of "Cater 2 U" was performed by Usher and Babyface at the 2005 World Music Awards as a tribute to the group, due to their disbandment.

== Writing and production ==
"Cater 2 U" was written by Destiny's Child members Beyoncé, Kelly Rowland and Michelle Williams, along with Rodney "Darkchild" Jerkins, Ricky "Ric Rude" Lewis and Robert Waller. The production was handled by Beyoncé, Rude and Jerkins, with the group members also serving as the vocal producers. The song was recorded in 2004 at Sony Music Studios in New York City with guidance from Jeff Villanueva and Jim Caruna. The audio mixing was done by Tony Maserati while the mastering was finished by Tom Coyne.

== Music and lyrics ==
"Cater 2 U"
A 22-second sample from the chorus of "Cater 2 U" and the last verse sung by Beyoncé, showcasing the symphonic crescendo.

"Cater 2 U" is a four-minute long R&B ballad. According to the sheet music published on the website Musicnotes.com by Sony/ATV Music Publishing, "Cater 2 U" was composed using common time in the key of D major with a slow tempo of 63 beats per minute. The vocal elements span from A_{3} to B_{4}. Instrumentally it consists of silky synthesizers "slink[ing] and slurp[ing]" throughout, creating a seductive feel as stated by Dimitri Ehlrich of Vibe and writers of Billboard magazine. As the song progresses, it builds to a symphonic crescendo.

Lyrically, "Cater 2 U" talks about females wanting to submissively serve their male love interests and take care of them as they admire their hard work and are inspired by them. The trio further sings about the men of their lives and the way in which they will take care of them. "Cater 2 U" was written as a continuation on the previous song on Destiny Fulfilled, "Soldier"; after the trio sings about finding a suitable lover in the aforementioned song, they express a will to cater to him in "Cater 2 U". In the second edition of the book Introducing Cultural Studies, the authors argued that the song contained lyrics about objectification of women, which suggested that their gender role was to "'keep herself up', 'keep it right', 'cater to' their man by providing him with his dinner, a foot rub, a manicure, fetching his slippers, and much more, on demand". An editor writing in The Times of India found a theme of feminine assertiveness in "Cater 2 U"; he noted that "the women come off not so much as lovers as full-service romantic servants". J. Freedom du Lac, a staff writer of The Washington Post wrote that the song's theme was supplication.

Beyoncé opens the song listing the things she would do for her man during her verses: brush his hair, take his shoes off, give him a manicure, rub his feet, help him put his do-rag on, undo his cufflinks. She also sings the lines "Let me feed you, let me run your bath water, whatever you desire" after the things she had previously listed. Rowland was noted for nearly rapping her solo part during which she promises to "keep my figure right," "keep my hair fixed" and acknowledges that if her man comes later home while she's asleep, "all he's gotta do is tap her on the shoulder and 'I'll roll over.'" Williams sings her solo verses during the song's bridge.

During an interview with MTV News, Beyoncé spoke about the meaning of the song: "It basically talks about how a guy inspires you... You want to make him happy and you want to cater to him. I know it's going to be surprising to a lot of people that the independent survivors are being submissive to their man, but it's important that people know that, you know, it's fine if your man deserves it and gives that back to you."

== Critical reception ==
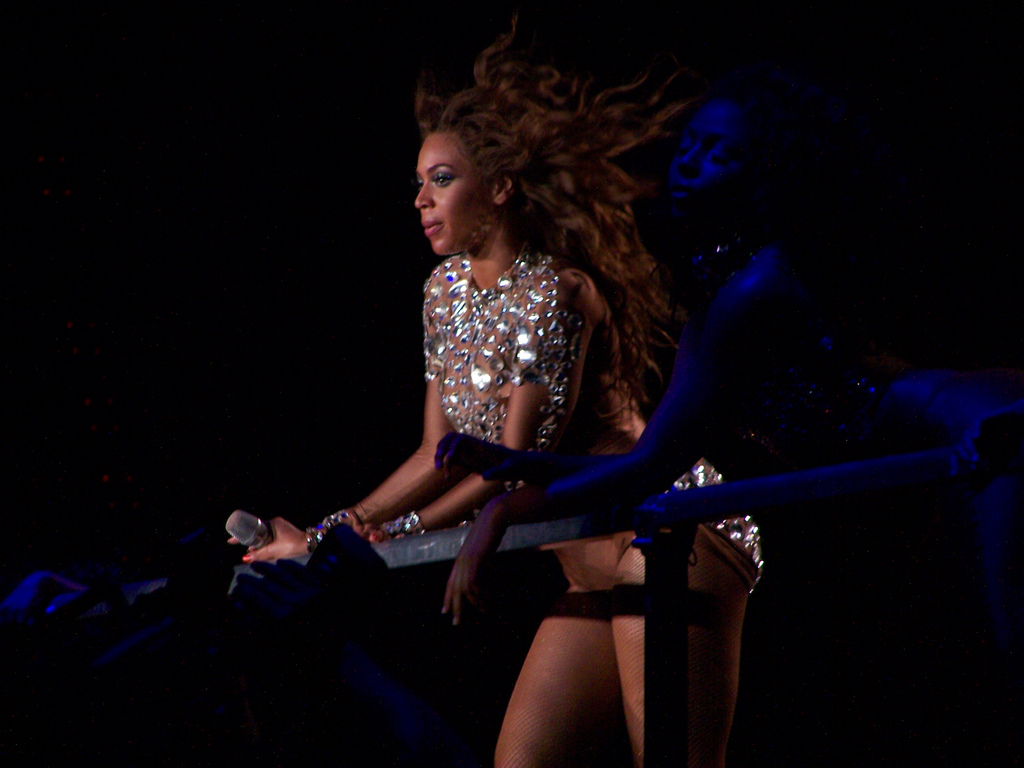
Beyoncé performing a segment during The Beyoncé Experience in which "Cater 2 U" was included.

Tom Sinclair of Entertainment Weekly noted the song was one of Destiny Fulfilled's "nice bits here and there", adding, "the pillow-talky pandering of 'Cater 2 U' ... is hard to resist." AllMusic's writer Stephen Thomas Erlewine included "Cater 2 U" as one of the highlights on the album. Slant Magazine writer Eric Henderson opined: "But just about the only element of the whole album that really sticks is the Laura Bush-worthy domestic complacency of 'Cater 2 U,' in which the trio espouses their joy in total submission." Dimitri Ehrlich from Vibe found that "the sexy trio is far more believable on the seductive R&B ballad 'Cater 2 U,' in which they set the feminist movement back more than a century over the course of four minutes". Andy Battaglia writing for The A.V. Club felt that the song and "Soldier" "make sassy end-runs around notions of womanly subservience, but their best musical moments hide in tiny melismatic twirls instead of hooks". The Guardian's Caroline Sullivan wrote that "Cater 2 U" was one of the songs that showcased "the girliness in the trio, musically and lyrically". In a review of Love Songs (2013), Amanda Koellner from the website Consequence of Sound described "Cater 2 U" as a "sleek" album opener. Thomas Inskeep of Stylus Magazine hailed the song "sexy" while USA Today's Elysa Gardner felt it was more "gently sensuous". Rebecca Thomas from MTV News felt that the song differentiated from the trio's other material and added: "While the Third Wave set may have side-eyed the gushy ballad, male fans eagerly welcomed [it]".

The lyrics of the song were criticized with BBC's Nick Reynolds saying that although the group "reinvent[ed] themselves as domestic goddesses for some lucky man", the song was neither convincing nor good. He further opined "I thought they were supposed to be independent women?!", juxtaposing it with the group's earlier song "Independent Women Part I" (2000). Jenny Eliscu of Rolling Stone echoed his statements, writing: "Jerkins should hang his head in shame for having a hand in the maudlin 'Cater 2 U,' a saccharine tune about how low Knowles, Rowland and Williams will stoop to prove their devotion to their man ... Since when did these independent women become so craven?". Sean Fennessey of Pitchfork Media also stated that "their swan song of sorts ... completely defies the winking empowerment most of their greatest jams provided". He further described the production as "milky and slight", the chorus as "limp" and the song overally as "a Prince mock-up of the worst kind". Jess Harvell of the same website offered similar criticism: "[The song] reneged on everything early DC stood for in a parade of kept-wifey pleas". Alex MacPherson of Stylus Magazine dismissed the sincerity of the lyrics, classifying "Cater 2 U" as a "queasy" song. Neil McCormick from The Daily Telegraph panned it as "cringe inducing, with lots of sensuous moaning". Barbara Ellen of The Observer wrote: "I thought this was the kind of song bands recorded by mistake then hid guiltily in the attic".

At the 48th Annual Grammy Awards (2006), "Cater 2 U" was nominated in two categories, Best R&B Song and Best R&B Performance by a Duo or Group with Vocals, ultimately losing in both. The song won an award for Best R&B/Soul Single, Group, Band or Duo at the 2006 Soul Train Music Awards. It was one of the Award Winning R&B/Hip-Hop Songs at the 2006 ASCAP Rhythm & Soul Music Awards. In 2013, Lindsey Weber from the website Vulture listed "Cater 2 U" at number seven on her list of the 25 best songs by Destiny's Child. Weber went on to describe it as "probably the least feminist song" of the band's material, but "the best song ever to lyrically use the phrase 'run your bathwater'" and hailed Williams for her contribution during the bridge. For Beyoncé's 32nd birthday, Erika Ramirez and Jason Lipshutz of Billboard included "Cater 2 U" at number 25 on the list "Beyonce's 30 Biggest Billboard Hits".

== Commercial performance ==
In the United States, the song debuted at number 95 on the Billboard Hot 100 dated April 30, 2005. In its fifth week, it ascended to number 83 on May 28. After several weeks of ascending the chart, "Cater 2 U" peaked at number 14 for the week ending August 13. On the Hot R&B/Hip-Hop Songs chart, the song entered the top ten at number six in its 19th week, on July 9. It became the group's fourth top-ten single from Destiny Fulfilled and the group's 12th top-ten song overall. On the chart issue dated July 30, "Cater 2 U" climbed from number four to number three, which became its peak, and stayed there for three additional consecutive weeks. It became the second single from Destiny Fulfilled and the group's seventh overall top-five single on the Hot R&B/Hip-Hop Songs. The Recording Industry Association of America (RIAA) certified the single gold on December 13, for sales of 500,000 digital copies in the US, while its mastertone was certified platinum on June 14, 2006, for selling 1,000,000 copies.

In the Netherlands, "Cater 2 U" debuted and peaked at number 60 on September 17, 2005. On October 1, "Cater 2 U" debuted at number 20 on the Ultratip chart in the Flanders region of Belgium and moved to its peak position at number 18 the following week, before falling off the chart. It performed better on the same chart in Wallonia, where it peaked at number eight on October 22. In Australia, the song debuted and peaked at number 15 on the ARIA Singles Chart on August 21, and spent six weeks within the chart's top 50. On the New Zealand Singles Chart, "Cater 2 U" debuted at number seven on August 29. It fell to number nine the following week and started gradually descending the chart, last appearing on October 10 at number 40 after seven weeks of charting.

== Music video ==
The accompanying music video for "Cater 2 U" was directed by Jake Nava. It was filmed back-to-back with the video for "Girl" and large parts were filmed at Red Rock Canyon State Park in California. On July 5, 2005, the music video was released via MTV's official website. It was also included on the DualDisc edition of #1's (2005) and the Japanese edition of the DVD Live in Atlanta (2006). In 2013, it was included on the album Destiny's Child Video Anthology, which contained nearly every music video the group had filmed during their career; an image taken from the video of "Cater 2 U" was used as the cover artwork for the DVD.

The video opens with a fast instance of a sun rising in the sky and moves to the girls standing nude together. Each singer is featured in her own desert scene, performing individually during her respective verse; Beyoncé is seen on a diving board next to a swimming pool, Rowland on a deserted road where she dances next to a silver car from which she had previously got out of and Williams on a sunlounger at nighttime. During the chorus, the group members are seen wearing black fishtail evening dresses, performing a choreographed dance routine for the camera and three males who watch them from the side; the men are never filmed in the same shot as Destiny's Child. During the end, each member is seen together with one of their male partners and the video fades away showing the trio nude again as during the beginning.

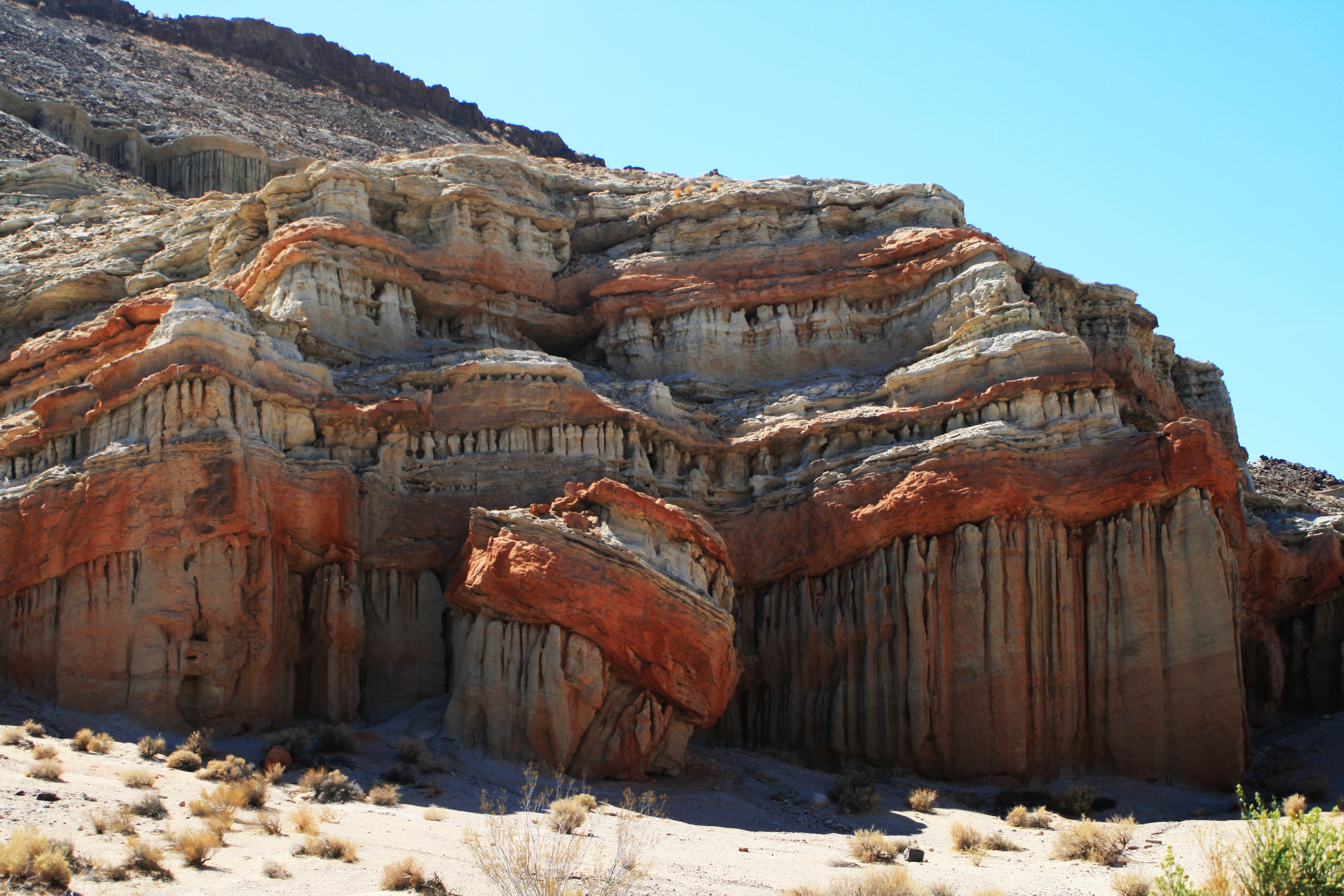
The music video was shot at Red Rock Canyon State Park in California

While reviewing the video of "Cater 2 U", Rashaun Hall of MTV News felt that "[the trio] have decided to go au naturale — tastefully, of course". He further concluded that the clip "is all about scenery and the beauty of the trio". In their book Music Video and the Politics of Representation, Diane Railton and Paul Watson felt that the presence of men "seems utterly superfluous to the video's spectacle of female bodies and female pleasures". They further noted that the video's imagery and performance managed to proceed without a reference to its lyrics and elaborated,

"Indeed, the abstracted emptiness of its desert spaces, the posed tableaux of the women's bodies and the noticeable lack of attention directed to its male subjects by both the camera and the group, does not simply jar with the lyrical narrative of female subordination but in fact reinforces the image of Destiny's Child as independent women who are in control of their own lives. That is to say, the video (re)establishes an image of women who are in control of their own bodies, their own desires, their relationship with men and their friendships with women."

== Live performances ==
On November 16, 2004, Destiny's Child performed "Cater 2 U" during the Good Morning America broadcast on the American Broadcasting Company (ABC). They performed it again on December 18 on season 30 of Saturday Night Live, along with their then-recent single "Soldier" with Lil Wayne. The song was also performed at the 2005 BET Awards in Los Angeles on June 28, 2005. Midway through the performance, for which the members wore form-fitting, floor-length brown gowns, they randomly picked Terrence Howard, Nelly and Magic Johnson from the audience to the stage and performed a lap dance for them. Corey Moss of MTV News felt that their performance was one of the more memorable ones of the night. Emily Tan from the website Idolator noted that the performance was one of the group's best, further writing: "No one expected the girls to get as down and dirty as they did ... But it looked like no one was complaining." Steve Baltin, writing for Rolling Stone, remarked that the group provided "some sizzle". The group gave a live rendition of "Cater 2 U" again on NBC's The Today Show on July 29. A writer for People felt that "Beyoncé shimmies and shakes things up" during the performance. An acoustic version was also performed on MTV during its 2005 Spring Break coverage.

In 2005, "Cater 2 U" was part of the set list of the group's final tour Destiny Fulfilled... and Lovin' It, where they performed it in the same style as during the BET Awards, following the popularity of that performance. During the performance, the trio, dressed in long blue floor-length gowns, called three men from the audience to the stage and performed a choreography similar to a lap dance. In a review of a concert in the United Kingdom, Adenike Adenitire of MTV News felt that the song was suitable to "slow things down", following the previous energetic performances of the show. "Cater 2 U" was included on the track listing of the group's live album Live in Atlanta (2006) chronicling a concert from the tour in that city. Following the group's disbandment, both Beyoncé and Rowland included "Cater 2 U" in the set lists of their respective solo tours. The former performed it as part of a Destiny's Child medley included during The Beyoncé Experience (2007). It was subsequently included in the live DVD The Beyoncé Experience Live (2007), which included a concert filmed at the Staples Center in Los Angeles, California. Similarly, Rowland performed "Cater 2 U" live during her Lights Out Tour (2013) as part of a segment which included songs by Destiny's Child.

== Tributes ==
Usher and Babyface performed "Cater 2 U" at the 2005 World Music Awards on August 31 as a tribute to Destiny's Child, due to their disbandment. Byron Flitsch of MTV described their duet as "sensual". In 2009, "Cater 2 U" was referenced in Lil Wayne and Drake's song "My Darlin' Baby".

== Controversy ==
Chicago-based singer-songwriter Rickey Allen pushed allegations that "Cater 2 U" was inspired by a song he had composed with the same title and spelling, which was copyrighted in the mid-1990s and 2000, and performed locally during that time. He claimed he handed over a version to producer Maurice Joshua, who allegedly went on to cover the song with Destiny's Child. Joshua denied his claims, noting that he never held a copy of Allen's song. Allen filed a lawsuit against the group for compensation in a Chicago court in 2006 where the group was due to appear in December 10 for an eight-day trial. However, they managed to avoid any given court dates after their public split and agreed to settle behind closed doors. In early December 2009, it was confirmed by Chicago Sun-Times that the group had reached a settlement with Allen. His attorney Matthew Wildermuth said in a statement: "I can confirm that yes, [the case] did settle. All of the issues have been amicably resolved and the case is going to be dismissed. [Allen is] excited about being able to devote time to pursuing his musical career. All legal terms and agreement will not be released and the case will be dismissed by a judge".

== Formats and track listings ==
US 12-inch vinyl and digital EP

1. "Cater 2 U" (Storch Remix Edit) – 4:09
2. "Cater 2 U" (Storch Remix) – 5:54
3. "Cater 2 U" (Storch Remix Instrumental) – 6:05
4. "Cater 2 U" (album version) – 4:07
5. "Cater 2 U" (Joshua Remix) – 6:42
6. "Cater 2 U" (Grizz to the Club) – 4:23
7. "Cater 2 U" (a cappella) – 3:58

US Dance Mixes EP

1. "Cater 2 U" (album version) – 4:05
2. "Cater 2 U" (Grizz to the Club) – 4:22
3. "Cater 2 U" (George Mena & Franke Estevez Dance Mix) – 6:06
4. "Cater 2 U" (J. Beck Dance Remix) – 3:59
5. "Cater 2 U" (J. Beck Club Mix) – 7:18

International digital single

1. "Cater 2 U" (album version) – 4:05
2. "Cater 2 U" (Storch Remix Edit) – 4:09

International digital EP and Australian maxi CD single

1. "Cater 2 U" (album version) – 4:05
2. "Cater 2 U" (Storch Remix Edit) – 4:06
3. "Cater 2 U" (Grizz to the Club) – 4:24
4. "Cater 2 U" (J. Beck Dance Remix) – 4:01
5. "Girl" (Maurice Joshua "U Go Girl" Remix) – 6:00

== Personnel ==
Personnel are adapted from the liner notes of Destiny Fulfilled.

- Beyoncé Knowles – lead vocals, vocal production
- Kelly Rowland – lead vocals, vocal production
- Michelle Williams – lead vocals, vocal production
- Jeff Villanueva – recording
- Jim Caruna – recording
- Tony Maserati – mixing
- Tom Coyne – mastering
- Tim Stewart – guitar

== Charts ==
=== Weekly charts ===
2005 weekly chart performance for "Cater 2 U"
Chart (2005)	Peak position
Australia (ARIA)	15
Australian Urban (ARIA)	8
Belgium (Ultratip Bubbling Under Flanders)	18
Belgium (Ultratip Bubbling Under Wallonia)	8
CIS Airplay (TopHit)	173
Netherlands (Dutch Top 40 Tipparade)	7
Netherlands (Single Top 100)	60
New Zealand (Recorded Music NZ)	7
Russia Airplay (TopHit)	160
Ukraine Airplay (TopHit)	199
US Billboard Hot 100	14
US Dance Club Songs (Billboard)	5
US Hot R&B/Hip-Hop Songs (Billboard)	3
US Rhythmic Airplay (Billboard)	11
US CHR/Pop Indicator (Radio & Records)	45

=== Year-end charts ===
2005 year-end chart performance for "Cater 2 U"
Chart (2005)	Position
US Billboard Hot 100	66
US Hot R&B/Hip-Hop Songs (Billboard)	11
US Rhythmic Top 40 (Billboard)	60

== Certifications ==
Certifications and sales for "Cater 2 U"
Region	Certification	Certified units/sales
New Zealand (RMNZ)	2× Platinum	60,000^{‡}
United Kingdom (BPI)	Silver	200,000^{‡}
United States (RIAA)	Platinum	1,000,000^{‡}
United States (RIAA) Mastertone	Platinum	1,000,000^{^}
^{^} Shipments figures based on certification alone.^{‡} Sales+streaming figures based on certification alone.

== Release history ==
Release dates and formats for "Cater 2 U"
Region	Date	Format(s)	Version(s)	Label(s)	Ref.
United States	June 7, 2005	Contemporary hit radio	Original	Columbia; Sony Urban	
United States	June 14, 2005	Digital download (EP)	Dance Mixes	Columbia; Sony Urban	
United States	July 19, 2005	12-inch vinyl; digital download (EP)	Original; remixes; a cappella	Columbia; Sony Urban	
Various (Note: excluding the US)	July 25, 2005	Digital download (EP)	Original; remixes	Sony BMG	
Australia	August 8, 2005	Maxi CD	Original; remixes	Sony BMG	
Various	September 12, 2005	Digital download	Original; Storch Remix Edit	Sony BMG	

== See also ==
- Billboard Year-End Hot 100 singles of 2005

== Bibliography ==
- Railton, Diane; Watson, Paul (2011). Music Video and the Politics of Representation. Edinburgh, Scotland: Edinburgh University Press. pp. 8–10. ISBN 978-0-7486-3323-4.
- Longhurst, Brian; Bagnall, Gaynor; Smith, Greg; Crawford, Garry; McCracken, Scott; Ogborn, Miles; Baldwin, Elaine (2008). Introducing Cultural Studies (2, illustrated ed.). Upper Saddle River, New Jersey: Pearson Education. p. 52. ISBN 978-1-4058-5843-4.
- Scapolo, Dean (2007). The Complete New Zealand Music Charts: 1966–2006. Wellington: Dean Scapolo and Maurienne House. ISBN 978-1-877443-00-8.
