= Destiny Fulfilled =

Studio album by Destiny's Child
- Released: November 8, 2004
- Recorded: 2004
- Studios: 2nd Floor (Orlando); Big3 (St. Petersburg); Cash Money (New Orleans); Silent Sound (Atlanta); Sony (New York); Studio 609 (Philadelphia)
- Genre: R&B
- Length: 47:57
- Labels: Columbia; Sony Urban
- Producers: 9th Wonder; Bryan Michael Cox; Dre & Vidal; Sean Garrett; Rich Harrison; Rodney Jerkins; Beyoncé Knowles; Rockwilder; Kelly Rowland; Ric Rude; Erron Williams; Michelle Williams; Mario Winans; WyldCard

Destiny's Child chronology
This Is the Remix (2002)	Destiny Fulfilled (2004)	#1's (2005)

Singles from Destiny Fulfilled
- 1. "Lose My Breath" Released: September 9, 2004; 2. "Soldier" Released: November 8, 2004; 3. "Girl" Released: March 14, 2005; 4. "Cater 2 U" Released: June 7, 2005

Destiny Fulfilled is the fifth and final studio album by American girl group Destiny's Child. It was released on November 8, 2004, by Columbia Records and Sony Urban Music. Following the conclusion of promotional activities for their globally successful third studio album Survivor (2001), Destiny's Child embarked on a two-year hiatus, during which each member released solo albums to varying levels of success. They reunited in the summer of 2004 to record Destiny Fulfilled, primarily at the Sony Music Studios in New York City. Unlike the group's previous recordings, the album saw each member equally contributing to the songwriting and production, drawing inspiration from the events in their lives while being apart.

Executive producing Destiny Fulfilled alongside their manager Mathew Knowles, Destiny's Child further worked with frequent collaborators such as Rockwilder and Rodney Jerkins, as well as several new ones, including 9th Wonder, Sean Garrett and Rich Harrison. Their efforts resulted with an R&B record further exploring genres such as crunk, dance, hip hop and funk. Lyrically a concept album, each of its tracks is a continuation of its predecessor, altogether telling a complete story tracing a woman's relationship journey. The balladry and lyrical content were met with generally mixed reviews from music critics, who nevertheless praised the equality of contributions among members and their vocal performances.

A highly-anticipated comeback album, Destiny Fulfilled went through several release date alterations due to a concern over Internet leaks, ultimately being released a day earlier. Its street date violation resulted with a premature debut at number 19 on the US Billboard 200. The album's sales were principally unaffected by the unconventional release as it subsequently peaked at number two, selling 558,000 units within its first eight days of release, and went on to be certified triple platinum by the Recording Industry Association of America (RIAA). Despite its mixed critical reception, the album garnered five Grammy Award nominations, including Best Contemporary R&B Album. One of the best-selling girl group albums of all time, the album has sold over seven million copies worldwide.

Destiny Fulfilled produced four singles. "Lose My Breath" and "Soldier" both peaked at number three on the US Billboard Hot 100 and achieved widespread international commercial success. "Girl" peaked only at number 23 on the US Billboard Hot 100 but was a top-10 hit in Australia, Ireland, New Zealand and the United Kingdom. Meanwhile, "Cater 2 U" fared better on the US Billboard Hot 100, peaking at number 14. Destiny's Child further promoted the album with their world tour Destiny Fulfilled... and Lovin' It (2005). During the tour's Palau Sant Jordi show in Barcelona on June 11, 2005, the group announced their disbandment; they formally disbanded following the release of the live album Live in Atlanta (2006).

== Background and development ==
"People ask why. We're friends. We enjoy each other. We sound good together. We grew up together and hopefully we can set an example for other groups, and other female groups especially, that you can support each other and not be insecure and be happy for one another. And it's OK to do solo projects and to grow up and get a life. But it's also OK to come back together... It doesn't always have to be what the media tries to make it out to be. Women can get along and be businesswomen and be smart and not be catty all the time."

— Beyoncé reflecting on the motives behind Destiny's Child's reunion.

In April 2001, Destiny's Child released their highly-anticipated third studio album Survivor. Fueled by the widespread commercial success of "Independent Women Part I" and "Survivor", it became their first US Billboard 200 number-one album. The album sold steadily and went on to be certified quadruple platinum by the Recording Industry Association of America (RIAA). Furthermore, it was nominated for Best R&B Album at the 44th Annual Grammy Awards (2002), and has sold over ten million copies worldwide. While recording Survivor in December 2000, Beyoncé announced that Destiny's Child would eventually embark on a hiatus which would allow each member to release a solo album, which they hoped would further increase interest in the group. The idea of solo albums emanated from the group's manager and Beyoncé's father Mathew Knowles. Kelly Rowland further explained in an interview that Destiny's Child had been present in the media for a long time and they wanted to "give the public eye a rest from DC for a minute". During that same interview, she acknowledged that the trio would reunite during the fall of 2003 to start recording a new album.

During the hiatus, Michelle Williams released two gospel studio albums–Heart to Yours (2002) and Do You Know (2004). The former peaked atop the US Billboard Top Gospel Albums chart, becoming 2002's biggest selling gospel album; with over 220,000 copies sold in the US and 500,000 worldwide. Furthermore, Williams won a British MOBO Award for "Best Gospel Act" in 2002 and made her Broadway debut, as the lead in the musical Aida on November 18, 2003. Although Beyoncé's solo album was initially scheduled for October 2002, its release was postponed due to the success of Kelly Rowland's collaboration with Nelly, "Dilemma", which peaked atop the US Billboard Hot 100 for a cumulative 10 weeks and won a Grammy Award for Best Rap/Sung Performance at the 45th Annual Grammy Awards. Therefore, Rowland's pop rock-oriented solo debut Simply Deep was moved up to October, ahead of Beyoncé's album. Simply Deep debuted at number 12 on the US Billboard 200, and has gone on to be certified gold by the Recording Industry Association of America (RIAA), selling over 600,000 copies in the US and over 2.5 million worldwide. Beyoncé, who was the last member to release an album, was regarded the most successful with Dangerously in Love (2003). The album debuted atop the US Billboard 200, enjoying international commercial success and widespread critical acclaim. Furthermore, it produced two US Billboard Hot 100 number-one hits–"Crazy in Love" and "Baby Boy"–and won five Grammy Awards at the 46th Annual Grammy Awards (2004), causing Beyoncé to tie for winning the most Grammy Awards at a single ceremony among women. (Note: Beyoncé tied with Lauryn Hill, Alicia Keys and Norah Jones for the record, and later broke it at the 52nd Annual Grammy Awards (2010), when she won six awards.) The members' respective solo achievements led to intense speculation over the disbandment of Destiny's Child. In July 2004, amidst the rumors, Rowland announced the group's return to the studio to record Destiny Fulfilled. The group claimed the reunion was destined to happen, and that their affinity for each other kept them together.

== Recording and production ==
Production of Destiny Fulfilled commenced during the summer of 2004, with Destiny's Child enlisting frequent collaborators such as Rockwilder and Rodney Jerkins, as well as new ones, including 9th Wonder, Sean Garrett and Rich Harrison. 9th Wonder initially met Beyoncé while she was in the recording studio as her now-husband, rapper Jay-Z recorded the song "Threat" for his album The Black Album (2003). After Jay-Z went through the CD of tracks 9th Wonder had handed to him, Beyoncé mentioned that she liked what she heard from him. Several months later, 9th Wonder received a call from Jay-Z, asking for him to give the CD to Destiny's Child. He was surprised at being contacted by the rapper about working with the group, as he confessed that he had never owned an album by them. He later traveled to Los Angeles to work with the trio for their next album. During the three-day session, he produced the songs "Girl", "Is She the Reason" and "Game Over". Garrett, who co-wrote "Lose My Breath", "Soldier", "T-Shirt", "Is She the Reason", "Girl" and "Through with Love", recalled working on the album: "There was so much magic going on in the studio. We probably recorded all the songs in about a month and every day it was a new song coming out. 'Lose My Breath' was towards the latter part of the album and that was an amazing song that we felt could not only be big on the radio but big with bands and marching bands. I was on a natural high after that."

Destiny's Child recorded Destiny Fulfilled within a three-week period, mostly at the Sony Music Studios in New York City, where all tracks except "Through with Love" were recorded. They took the role of executive producing, alongside their manager Mathew Knowles. Beyoncé, who vocally produced the songs, commented that it was important for her to make sure their voices were audible and identifiable. Taking it as one of her goals, the group decided to focus on mid-tempo songs and on few dance tracks and ballads—which they considered songs listeners cannot sing along with. Beyoncé further elaborated: "We wanted to make sure that the songs would be something that we were proud of 10 years from now, 20 years from now. We wanted it to be something that people can really feel an emotion to. Up-tempo songs can do that, but they more make you wanna dance." Jerkins, who had worked with the group on their previous studio albums and with Beyoncé for her solo debut Dangerously in Love (2003), was concerned with how he would manage the production, saying: "How is this going to work?' Cause Beyoncé, she blew up solo, so how's it going to work in a group together?". However, he stated his skepticism vanished once the recording commenced, as he saw the group's "excitement being back in the studio together", calling the process "natural".

The members stated the first week of recording Destiny Fulfilled was spent solely on conversations about the events in their lives while being apart, as they hadn't spent quality time together for an extended period. This further inspired them to record the conversations and use it as the main theme of the record. In most cases, producers would send the group a CD containing a track which would serve as the basis in the songwriting process; without the producers' supervision of which part to sing, a new direction of their style was formed, differing from their previous records. The traditional approach where each member sang one verse and chimed in the chorus was replaced; on some tracks from Destiny Fulfilled, their vocals alternated on every line of the lyrics, a technique similar to hip hop artists. Differing from Survivor, on which Beyoncé had taken an active role in writing and producing, Destiny Fulfilled saw each member contributing inputs culled from personal experiences, individual opinions and points of view independent of those from the other members. As Kelly Rowland was recently engaged during the songwriting process, her writing was further influenced by the engagement. She also cited that being apart from the group affected the lyrical themes as well: "All of us have been in three different places ... so there's a lot to talk about, a lot that's gone on, personally. I think it's important to talk about that on this new record, to put what we've been going through separately into the new record."

== Music and lyrics ==
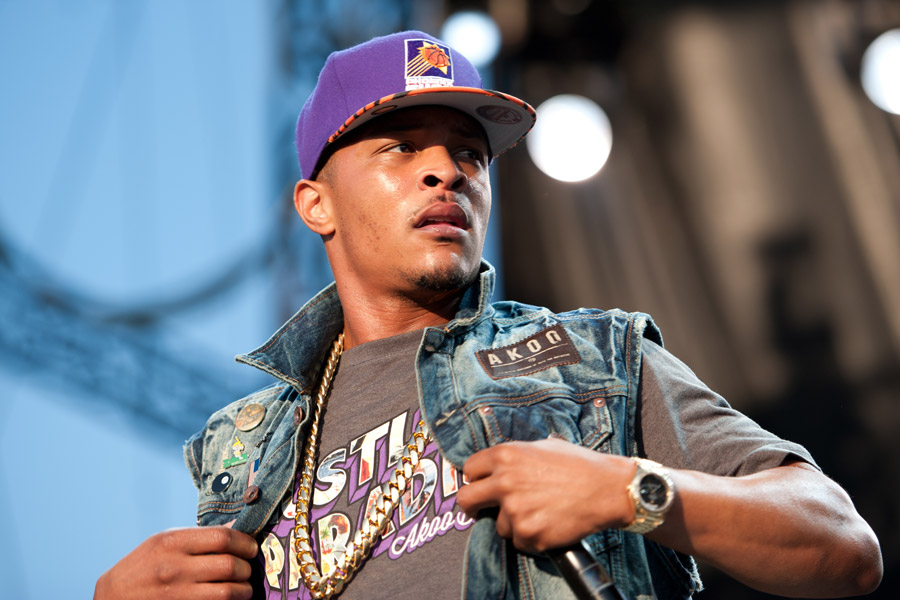
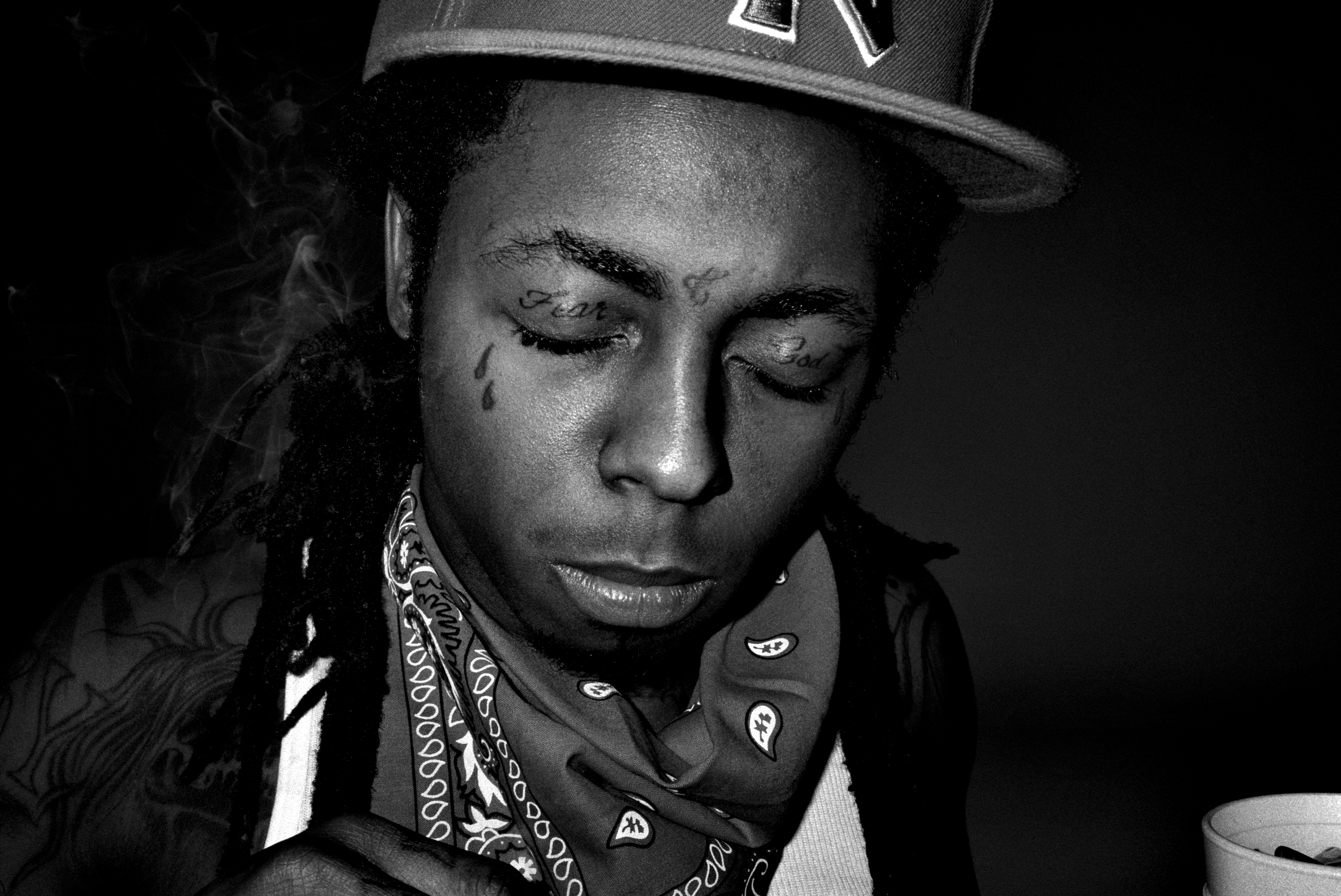
American rappers T.I. (left) and Lil Wayne (right) were the only two featured artists on the album, appearing on the second track "Soldier".

During an interview with MTV, Beyoncé stated that the songs from Destiny Fulfilled put altogether tell a complete story and noted that each track was a subsequent continuation of its predecessor. She concluded: "[The album continues with] this whole journey of this group of women trying to find love. And truly they find it because they love themselves and find it in themselves. It's friendship, it's love, it's maturity and growth, and it's everything that we wanted it to be." Musically, Destiny's Child tried challenging themselves, as they worked with different arrangements while trying to create an original sound; to succeed in this, they were influenced by The Emotions, Jodeci and SWV mixing elements of their music. Their final product was a predominantly R&B record, which further incorporated soul, dance and hip hop. The album is mostly composed of mid-tempo tracks, following the up-tempo first two tracks; Caroline Sullivan of The Guardian felt the balladry showcased "the girliness in the trio, musically and lyrically". Eric Henderson of Slant Magazine found elements of middle of the road music in the ballads.

Destiny Fulfilled opens with the up-tempo dance track "Lose My Breath", which details a man full of empty promises to a woman. It is musically complete with military, marching-band drums, keyboard stabs, and the backing track contains various sound effects. "Soldier", featuring T.I. and Lil Wayne, contains elements of Southern hip hop and crunk. Unsatisfied and unfulfilled with the lover from "Lose My Breath", the protagonists ask for a decent "soldier", further singing about finding a gangster. After finding him, the R&B ballad "Cater 2 U" lyrically details submissively serving the man. Inspired by him, the protagonists sing about doing various things to make him happy, musically accompanied by synthesizer as the song builds a crescendo. The fourth track "T-Shirt" is complete with inorganic drum sounds, guitar and backwards loop as the trio sings about sleeping in bed with their lover's T-shirt, "craving his presence, and inhailing his scent". "Is She the Reason" is an R&B ballad noted to have a similar chord progression to works of The Beatles. It lyrically follows a protagonist competing with another woman for her lover's love and attention. The song contains a trumpet-laden sample from Melba Moore's song "I Don't Know No One Else to Turn To".

"Girl" was noted for its Motown influence and friendship-themed lyrics. It features Beyoncé and Williams concerned about the relationship Rowland is in, trying to comfort her and persuade her to leave her partner. Rowland lyrically responds to them by ending the relationship on the following track "Bad Habit", on which she solely sings lead vocals. "If", complete with strings, lyrically talks about men who don't appreciate their girlfriends until their relationship ends and they realize their mistakes. "Free" was described as a "soul classic from 1975", with critics also noting elements of 1970s funk music, as the trio speaks on being "set free" after being in a relationship in which their efforts were never reciprocated. The mid-tempo track "Through with Love" was noted for its "angry" nature as it addresses a break-up. It features an undulating piano line as the members sing with restrained vocals and later religious redemption with elements of gospel. On the closing track "Love", "capital L kicks the daylights out of the forces of fear, doubt and disappointment", as the group "thank[s] God for love". They further sing about how people "can't truly love another until [they] love God and then [themselves]", proclaiming that they have found love and are "madly in it".

== Release and promotion ==
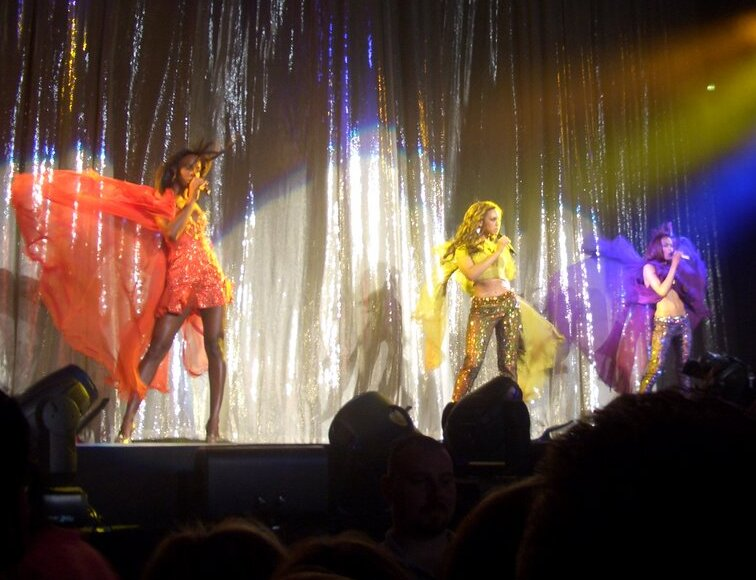
Destiny's Child performing "Say My Name" during the Destiny Fulfilled... and Lovin' It tour in May 2005

Promotion of Destiny Fulfilled commenced when Destiny's Child performed "Lose My Breath" on September 9, 2004, on ABC's 2004 NFL season "Opening Kickoff" special, to break their two-year hiatus. The album's track listing was revealed on October 15. On October 25, they appeared at the Radio Music Awards in Las Vegas, performing the song with an a cappella, jazz-styled opening. The following month, they performed a medley composed of "Say My Name", "Independent Women Part I" and "Survivor" and finished with "Lose My Breath" on The Oprah Winfrey Show, where they also sat down for an interview with Oprah Winfrey. On November 8, 2004, the trio appeared on Total Request Live and performed "Lose My Breath" along with "Say My Name". They additionally appeared on the German entertainment television show Wetten, dass..? on November 13, and performed "Lose My Breath". Originally slated for November 16, Destiny Fulfilled was released a day earlier due to Columbia Records' concern over "potential for Internet leaks and 'burned' CD counterfeits" which could "lead consumers to experience inferior and incomplete versions of the album". MTV had already made it available for streaming as part of its program "The Leak" on November 8, while Trans World Entertainment and Walmart began selling the album on November 12. Although the album's format was originally announced to be the then-new DualDisc, it was released on an audio-only CD; however, it was released on DualDisc on February 8, 2005. On BET's 106 & Park, Destiny's Child performed "Soldier" on November 15, 2004. They also performed the song on CBS's The Early Show on December 8. In February 2005, they gave another performance of "Soldier" on the British television show Top of the Pops. At the 2005 NBA All-Star Game on February 20, they performed both "Soldier" and "Lose My Breath". They performed the latter again at the 2005 ESPY Awards on July 13. "Cater 2 U" was performed on June 28 at the 2005 BET Awards in Los Angeles.

When the advanced release date of Destiny Fulfilled was announced, Destiny's Child confirmed the initial dates of their world tour Destiny Fulfilled... and Lovin' It, which visited Asia, Oceania, Europe and North America from April to September 2005. Promotions of the tour aired over radio stations and television channels across the United States, with the group further collaborating with McDonald's, which served as its sponsor. Outside North America, it was promoted with a CD+DVD tour edition of the album, which included music videos and live performances. The tour's set list included tracks from Destiny Fulfilled alongside Destiny's Child's previous work and each member's individual songs. Numerous costume changes occurred throughout the show; the concerts exhibited products from Beyoncé's clothing line from House of Deréon, the company she co-founded with her mother Tina Knowles. During a concert at the Palau Sant Jordi in Barcelona on June 11, Rowland announced before 16,000 spectators that Destiny's Child would disband following the end of the tour. In a statement released to MTV, the group said the tour had provided them the opportunity to depart from Destiny's Child on a "high note". They also talked about the moment when the group started their musical endeavor and their realizations of pursuing individual careers after working together for several years. Destiny's Child thanked fans for their support while not closing the chance of seeing them continue supporting each member's goals in music, film and television. The July 15 show in Atlanta was filmed for the video album Live in Atlanta, which was released on March 28, 2006. A commercial success, the video debuted atop the US Top Music Videos and was certified platinum by the Recording Industry Association of America (RIAA).

== Singles ==
The album's lead single "Lose My Breath" first appeared as a streaming track on September 9, 2004, exclusively from AOL Music, following which it was available as a digital download only from Walmart, then on October 5 it was made widely available. It hit the US Billboard Hot 100 at number 30 on October 2, rising to number 3 a month later, becoming the group's seventh consecutive top-ten single on the chart. Furthermore, it became their second Dance Club Songs number-one single. The digital single was certified platinum by the Recording Industry Association of America (RIAA) in July 2020. Internationally, the song peaked atop the European Hot 100 Singles, as well as charts in Belgium, Ireland and Switzerland, further peaking within the top ten in almost every other country. The American Broadcasting Company (ABC) used the song as the music for their introductory montage during the 2004 NBA Playoffs and through the first few weeks of the 2005 NBA Playoffs. Critically acclaimed, it was nominated for Best R&B Performance by a Duo or Group with Vocals at the 47th Annual Grammy Awards (2005). Its accompanying music video was directed by Marc Klasfeld and shows the group members involved in an alleyway dance battle against their own duplicates. At the 2005 MTV Video Music Awards, the video was nominated for Best Dance Video.

"Soldier" was released as the second single from Destiny Fulfilled on November 9, 2004. Repeating the success of its predecessor, it peaked at number three on the US Billboard Hot 100 and atop the Dance Club Songs. The digital single was certified platinum by the RIAA in July 2020. Internationally, the song peaked within the top ten in Australia, Canada, Denmark, Finland, Ireland, Italy, the Netherlands, New Zealand, Switzerland and the United Kingdom. Critically acclaimed, it was nominated for Best Rap/Sung Collaboration at the 48th Annual Grammy Awards (2006). The black and white accompanying music video for the song was directed by Ray Kay and features appearances from featured artists T.I. and Lil Wayne, Beyoncé's sister Solange, singers Lloyd and Ginuwine, and rappers Bow Wow, Ice Cube, WC and Jeezy. At the 2005 MTV Video Music Awards, the video was nominated for Best Group Video.

"Girl" was released as the third single from Destiny Fulfilled on March 15, 2005. It failed to replicate the success of its predecessors as it peaked only at number 23 on the US Billboard Hot 100, ending Destiny's Child's streak of top-ten singles on the chart. The digital single was certified gold by the RIAA in October 2005. Internationally, the song peaked within the top ten in Australia, Ireland, New Zealand and the UK. Its Sex and the City-inspired accompanying music video was directed by Bryan Barber and follows the song's lyrical theme, with Rowland ending the video by leaving her deceitful lover.

"Cater 2 U" was released as the fourth and final single from Destiny Fulfilled on June 7, 2005. A moderate commercial success, it peaked at number 14 on the US Billboard Hot 100. The digital single was certified platinum by the RIAA in July 2020. Internationally, the song failed to chart in most countries due to its digital-only release, but peaked at number seven in New Zealand. Despite causing polarity among critics due to its lyrics, the song was nominated for Grammy Awards for Best R&B Performance by a Duo or Group with Vocals and Best R&B Song in 2006. Its Jake Nava-directed accompanying music video depicts the group in various settings at the Red Rock Canyon State Park.

"Got's My Own", which originally appeared as a bonus track on the Japanese edition of Destiny Fulfilled, was released as a promotional single on May 3, 2005.

== Critical reception ==
Professional ratings
Aggregate scores
Source	Rating
Metacritic	52/100
Review scores
Source	Rating
AllMusic	2.5/5 stars
Blender	3/5 stars
E!	C
The Encyclopedia of Popular Music	2/5 stars
Entertainment Weekly	C+
The Guardian	2/5 stars
Los Angeles Times	2.5/5 stars
Rolling Stone	2/5 stars
Slant Magazine	3/5 stars
Stylus Magazine	D+

Destiny Fulfilled received mixed reviews from music critics. At Metacritic, which assigns a weighted mean rating out of 100 based on reviews from mainstream critics, the album received an average score of 52 based on 17 reviews, indicating "mixed or average reviews". Dimitri Ehrlich of Vibe complimented the production, saying that it "showcases advanced production values" with "impressive" songwriting and vocal abilities, concluding that it "offers divine satisfaction". A writer for Billboard felt the album worked as "a testament to Beyoncé's evolving multiple talents". Stephen Thomas Erlewine of AllMusic praised Rowland's and Williams' abilities as vocalists and their contributions to the choruses, but felt that Beyoncé "steals every song", further commending her for sounding "larger than life even when she's quiet". However, he concluded: "as a whole, the album winds up sounding too reserved and heavy-handed, which makes it a disappointment". Andy Battaglia of The A.V. Club wrote in his review that "Destiny Fulfilled sounds distant and detached", further criticizing its mid-tempo balladry for sounding "uninterrupted at best, uninspired at worst". Kelefa Sanneh of The New York Times commented that the album is "a surprisingly perfunctory disc that never quite justifies its existence". Alan Ranta of Tiny Mix Tapes doubted Beyoncé's lyrical sincerity, saying: "the success of this album depends once again on the complete suspension of die-hard fans' disbelief that Beyoncé 'Your Ad Here' Knowles could ever actually truly love another human being as much as she loves herself and her possessions."

Caroline Sullivan of The Guardian commented that the lead vocals on Destiny Fulfilled were likely to be sung by each member equally, noting that it made the album a "democratic" one. However, she criticized Destiny's Child for squandering "the extent of their talents" on the album. Tom Sinclair of Entertainment Weekly also noticed its "overall air of democracy at work" and noted that the album "often moves at a molasses-like pace, weighted down with a preponderance of exquisitely executed but ultimately dull ballads". Jenny Eliscu of Rolling Stone echoed Sinclair's comments, saying: "In all but a couple of songs, the verses are divided into three sections, with Beyonce leading things off, followed by Rowland, then Williams". She noted that after a couple of upbeat songs, "the album slumps into an endless string of overwrought R&B ballads where the only saving grace is ... these ladies can harmonize like nobody's business." Eric Henderson of Slant Magazine commented that the album's ballads build into "the same sort of standoffish sexual supply-and-demand bartering that has marred their worst tracks". Sarah Godfrey from The Washington Post also criticized the balladry, alongside the absence of women's empowerment-themed lyrical content present on the group's previous recordings, but noted each member's individuality and praised their vocal performances.

== Accolades ==
=== Awards and nominations ===
Awards and nominations for Destiny Fulfilled
Year	Award	Category	Nominee(s)	Result	Ref.
2005	Soul Train Music Award	Best R&B/Soul Album – Group, Band or Duo	Destiny Fulfilled	Won	
2005	Japan Gold Disc Award	International Rock & Pop Albums of the Year	Destiny Fulfilled	Won	
2005	Soul Train Lady of Soul Award	Best R&B/Soul Album by a Group, Band or Duo	Destiny Fulfilled	Won	
2005	Dutch MOBO Award	Best Album	Destiny Fulfilled	Won	
2005	American Music Award	Favorite Soul/R&B Album	Destiny Fulfilled	Won	
2006	Grammy Award	Best Contemporary R&B Album	Destiny Fulfilled	Nominated	

=== Listings ===
Listings for Destiny Fulfilled
Year	Publication	List	Position	Ref.
2006	Q	The 50 Worst Albums Ever	24	

== Commercial performance ==
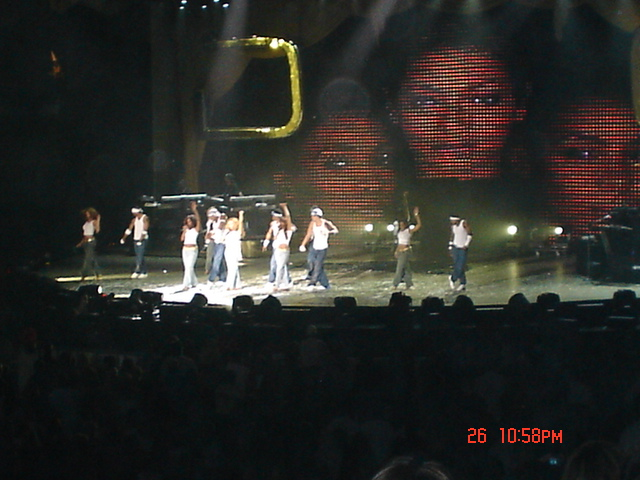
Destiny's Child performing "Lose My Breath" during the Destiny Fulfilled... and Lovin' It tour in August 2005

In the United States, Destiny Fulfilled prematurely debuted at number 19 on the Billboard 200 chart dated November 27, 2004 due to a street date violation, amassing sales of 61,000 copies in a single day and registering the highest pre-street date sales in the history of Nielsen SoundScan at the time. (Note: Although Destiny Fulfilled had been available for streaming via MTV's official website since November 8 and exclusively at Walmart and Trans World since November 12, only November 15 sales were counted by Nielsen SoundScan, as neither digital units nor exclusive titles were acknowledged by Nielsen SoundScan and Billboard at the time.) In its first full week of sales, Destiny Fulfilled sold over 497,000 copies, with an increase of 713% compared to its early sales, ascending to number two on the Billboard 200. The same week, it reached the summit of the Top R&B/Hip-Hop Albums after prematurely debuting at number 11. The group's second number-one album on the Top R&B/Hip-Hop Albums following Survivor (2001), it spent two weeks atop the chart. On January 14, 2005, the album was certified triple platinum by the Recording Industry Association of America (RIAA). It emerged seventh on the year-end Billboard 200 and third on Top R&B/Hip-Hop Albums for 2005. By October 2009, the album had sold 3.1 million copies in the US according to Nielsen SoundScan. In Canada, the album debuted and peaked at number three on the Canadian Albums Chart, and was certified platinum by Music Canada in June 2005.

In the United Kingdom, Destiny Fulfilled debuted and peaked at number five on the UK Albums Chart on November 27, 2004; it went on to spend a total of 25 weeks charting. Additionally, the album debuted and peaked at number two on the UK R&B Albums Chart. It was certified double platinum by the British Phonographic Industry (BPI) on April 20, 2018. Across Europe, the album reached the top ten in Austria, France, Germany, Ireland, the Netherlands, Spain and Switzerland. Furthermore, it peaked at number five on the European Top 100 Albums, and was certified platinum by the International Federation of the Phonographic Industry (IFPI) in December 2004 for sales of one million copies across Europe. In Australia, the album debuted and peaked at number 11 on the ARIA Top 100 Albums, being certified platinum by the Australian Recording Industry Association (ARIA) two weeks later. In New Zealand, it debuted at number 25 and peaked at number 21 in its 13th week, being certified gold by the Recorded Music NZ (RMNZ). In Japan, the album debuted and peaked at number four on the Oricon Albums Chart, and was soon after certified platinum by the Recording Industry Association of Japan (RIAJ). According to IFPI, Destiny Fulfilled was the eighth best-selling album worldwide of 2004. One of the best-selling girl group albums of all time, it has sold over seven million copies worldwide.

== Legacy ==
Upon the release of Destiny Fulfilled, numerous critics questioned why Beyoncé returned to Destiny's Child after achieving the most solo success among the members, with Eric Henderson from Slant Magazine lambasting her for performing with the group again with the "full intention" of taking advantage in order to bolster her "divette" status to superstardom. However, Beyoncé responded by saying the motive behind the group's reunion was their friendship rather than business. Writing for The Recording Academy, Dontaira Terrell retrospectively claimed Destiny Fulfilled "peeled back the layers of the pop phenom girl group we once knew and re-introduced us to a trio of fully evolved, self-realized women", further describing it as "an ode to the life lessons of friendship, spiritual enlightenment, personal growth and transformation. Its resonance is still widespread, and the baton of wisdom found in the albums [sic] lyrical content is just as relevant [in 2019] as it was 15 years ago."

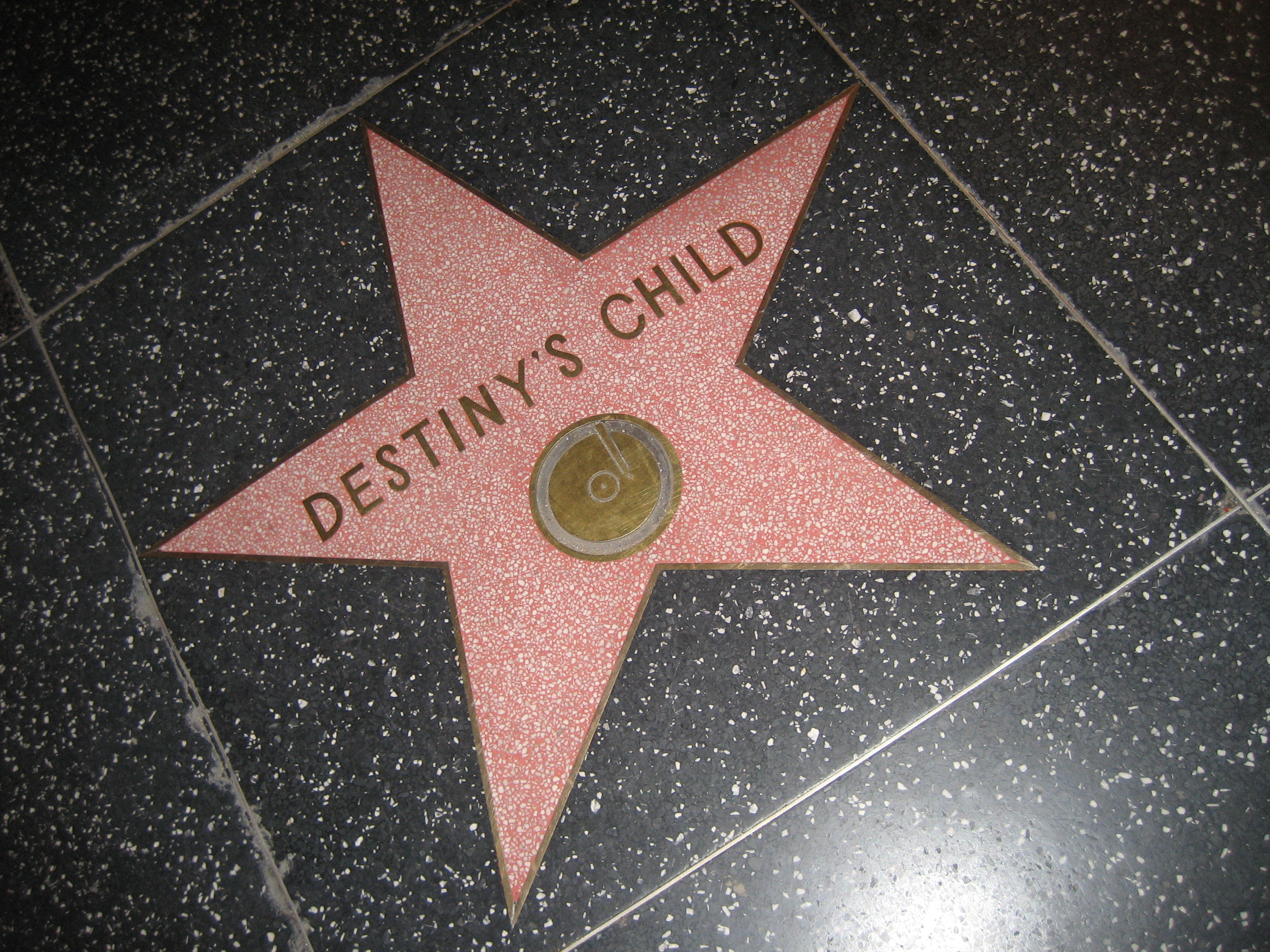
Destiny's Child's star on the Hollywood Walk of Fame, which they received in March 2006.

In the wake of their disbandment announcement in June 2005, Destiny's Child revealed in an interview that their disbandment had already been planned during the recording of Destiny Fulfilled, adding that its title was not coincidental. During the sessions, they discussed individual aspirations and realized that remaining as a group would prevent them in pursuing those interests. They further elaborated they wanted to part ways "while they were on top — and more importantly, while they were still friends". Beyoncé had also said "the group felt it still had something to offer musically" with the album, adding: "We did this record for ourselves, not to sell a million the first week out... That doesn't mean as much to us as just the fact that three friends got back together to do another record. That was our destiny.". Rowland commented: "We were like, 'You know what, we're getting older and we want to end on a high note.' We want to give our fans a great final record". Beyoncé also commented regarding the finality of their career: "Who knows what will happen in three, five or 10 years? The main thing is that we maintain our friendship and that we do it because we want to – not because it's a good business move."

Following the conclusion of Destiny Fulfilled... and Lovin' It, the group released their first greatest hits album #1's in October 2005, which became their second US Billboard 200 number-one album. It included three new tracks, one of which was Beyoncé's song "Check on It", which became her third US Billboard Hot 100 number-one single as a solo artist. They subsequently released the live video album Live in Atlanta on March 28, 2006, the same day they received a star on the Hollywood Walk of Fame. Afterwards, the group formally disbanded. Following the disbandment, Beyoncé recorded and released her second solo studio album B'Day (2006) to widespread critical and commercial success, while starring in the Academy Award-winning musical drama Dreamgirls. After numerous postponements, Rowland released her second studio album Ms. Kelly in June 2007; it became her first US Billboard 200 top-ten album. During Beyoncé and Rowland's respective promotions for their albums, Destiny's Child reunited at the BET Awards 2007 and during Beyoncé's 2007 world tour The Beyoncé Experience. Michelle Williams released her third studio album Unexpected, which showcased a drastic change in her musical style from gospel to dance-pop, in October 2008. Destiny's Child would not release another album until the compilation album Love Songs–which included Destiny Fulfilled tracks "Cater 2 U", "T-Shirt", "If" and "Love", alongside some of the group's other previous recordings and the newly-recorded "Nuclear"–in January 2013.

== Track listing ==
Destiny Fulfilled
No.	Title	Writer(s)	Producer(s)	Length
1.	"Lose My Breath"	Kelly Rowland; Beyoncé Knowles; Michelle Williams; Sean Garrett; LaShawn Daniels; Rodney Jerkins; Fred Jerkins; Shawn Carter	B. Knowles^{[a]}; R. Jerkins; Rowland^{[d]}; Garrett^{[b]}	4:02
2.	"Soldier" (featuring T.I. and Lil Wayne)	Rowland; B. Knowles; M. Williams; Garrett; Rich Harrison; Dwayne Carter; Clifford Harris	B. Knowles^{[a]}; Harrison	5:25
3.	"Cater 2 U"	Rowland; B. Knowles; M. Williams; R. Jerkins; Ric Rude; Robert Waller	B. Knowles^{[a]}; R. Jerkins; Rude; Rowland^{[d]}; M. Williams^{[d]}	4:07
4.	"T-Shirt"	Rowland; B. Knowles; M. Williams; Garrett; Angela Beyincé; Andre Harris; Vidal Davis	B. Knowles^{[a]}; Dre & Vidal; Garrett^{[b]}^{[c]}	4:40
5.	"Is She the Reason"	Rowland; B. Knowles; M. Williams; Garrett; Patrick Douthit; Victor Carstarphen; Gene McFadden; John Whitehead	B. Knowles^{[a]}; 9th Wonder; Garrett^{[c]}	4:47
6.	"Girl"	Rowland; B. Knowles; M. Williams; Garrett; Douthit; Beyince; Don Davis; Eddie Robinson	B. Knowles^{[a]}; 9th Wonder; Rowland^{[d]}	3:44
7.	"Bad Habit" (Kelly Rowland solo)	Rowland; Bryan-Michael Cox; Kendrick Dean; Solange Knowles	S. Knowles^{[d]}; Cox; Dean	3:54
8.	"If"	Rowland; B. Knowles; M. Williams; Dana Stinson; Big Drawers; Charles Jackson; Marvin Yancy	B. Knowles^{[a]}; Rockwilder; Juanita Wynn^{[b]}; Drawers^{[b]}	4:15
9.	"Free"	Rowland; B. Knowles; M. Williams; Drawers; Stinson; Larry Mizell; Fonce Mizell; James Carter	B. Knowles^{[a]}; Rockwilder	4:51
10.	"Through with Love"	Rowland; B. Knowles; M. Williams; Garrett; Mario Winans	B. Knowles^{[a]}; Winans	3:35
11.	"Love"	Rowland; B. Knowles; M. Williams; Beyince; Erron Williams	B. Knowles^{[a]}; E. Williams	4:32

International edition
No.	Title	Writer(s)	Producer(s)	Length
12.	"Game Over"	B. Knowles; Rowland; M. Williams; Garrett; Douthit; Michael Burton; Phil Terry	B. Knowles^{[a]}; 9th Wonder	4:03

Japanese edition
No.	Title	Writer(s)	Producer(s)	Length
12.	"Got's My Own"	B. Knowles; Rowland; M. Williams; Garrett; Daniels; R. Jerkins; Beyince; F. Jerkins	B. Knowles^{[a]}; R. Jerkins	3:59
13.	"Game Over"	B. Knowles; Rowland; M. Williams; Garrett; Douthit; Burton; Terry	B. Knowles^{[a]}; 9th Wonder	4:03
14.	"Why You Actin'"	B. Knowles; Rowland; M. Williams; Paul Allen; James Moss; Marcus Divine; Beyince	B. Knowles^{[a]}; PAJAM	4:28

Limited edition bonus disc (Note: exclusive to Walmart and Sam's Club)
No.	Title	Writer(s)	Producer(s)	Length
1.	"My Man"	B. Knowles; Waller; Scott Storch; Beyince	B. Knowles; Storch	3:33
2.	"2 Step"	B. Knowles; Waller; Storch; Rowland; M. Williams; Stephen Garrett	B. Knowles; Storch	3:24
3.	"Survivor" (extended remix) (featuring Da Brat)	B. Knowles; Anthony Dent; Mathew Knowles	B. Knowles; Dent	4:24
4.	"What's It Gonna Be" (Beyoncé solo)	B. Knowles; Roger Troutman; Larry Troutman; LaShaun Owens; Karrim Mack; Corte Ellis; Kandice Love	B. Knowles; Soul Diggaz	3:38
5.	"Independent Women Part II"	B. Knowles; Rapture Stewart; Eric Seats; David Donaldson; Frank Comstock	B. Knowles; Stewart; Seats	3:46

=== Notes ===
- ^a signifies a producer and vocal producer
- ^b signifies a vocal producer
- ^c signifies a co-producer
- ^d signifies an additional vocal producer
- DualDisc pressings include an interview and music videos for "Lose My Breath" and "Soldier" alongside "Game Over" and "Why You Actin'".
- Tour edition pressings include a bonus DVD containing an interview and music videos for "Lose My Breath", "Soldier", and "Girl", alongside Destiny's Child World Tour performances of "Independent Women Part I", "Say My Name", and "Survivor".

Sample credits

- "Is She the Reason" contains excerpts from "I Don't Know No One Else to Turn To" by Melba Moore.
- "Girl" contains sampled elements from "Ocean of Thoughts and Dreams" by the Dramatics.
- "If" contains excerpts from "Inseparable" by Natalie Cole.
- "Free" contains excerpts from "Night Whistler" by Donald Byrd.
- "Game Over" contains excerpts from "Flashback" by Dee Dee Sharp.
- "What's It Gonna Be" contains replayed elements of "Do It Roger" by Roger.

== Personnel ==
Credits are adapted from the liner notes of Destiny Fulfilled.

- Angela Beyincé – songwriting (tracks 4, 6 and 11)
- Big Drawers – songwriting (tracks 8 and 9), vocal production (track 8)
- Noemi Bonazzi – prop styling
- Alice V. Butts – design, art direction
- James Carter – songwriting (track 9)
- Shawn Carter – songwriting (track 1)
- Jim Caruana – engineering (tracks 1–9 and 11)
- Victor Carstarphen – songwriting (track 5)
- Candice Childress – production coordination (track 7)
- Bryan Michael Cox – keyboards (track 7), drum programming (track 7), production (track 7), songwriting (track 7)
- Tom Coyne – mastering (all tracks)
- Ian Cuttler – design, art direction
- LaShawn Daniels – songwriting (track 1)
- Don Davis – songwriting (track 6)
- Andrew Dawson – mixing (track 5)
- Kendrick "Wyldcard" Dean – keyboards (track 7), production (track 7), songwriting (track 7)
- Vincent DiLorenzo – engineering (track 4), mixing (track 4)
- Patrick "9th Wonder" Douthit – production (tracks 5 and 6), songwriting (tracks 5 and 6)
- Dre & Vidal – mixing (track 4), production (track 4), songwriting (track 4)
- Fabrizio Ferri – photography
- Sean Garrett – production (tracks 4 and 5), songwriting (tracks 1, 2, 4–6 and 10), vocal production (tracks 1 and 4)
- Rich Harrison – production (track 2), songwriting (track 2)
- Eric Hunter – engineering (track 10)
- Ty Hunter – styling
- Charles Jackson – songwriting (track 8)
- Fred Jerkins – songwriting (tracks 1 and 12)
- Rodney Jerkins – instrumentation (tracks 1 and 3), production (tracks 1 and 3), songwriting (tracks 1 and 3)
- Kimberly Kimble – hair
- Beyoncé Knowles – backing vocals (all tracks), executive production, lead vocals (tracks 1–6 and 8–11), production (tracks 1–6 and 8–11), songwriting (tracks 1–6 and 8–11), vocal production (tracks 1–6 and 8–11)
- Mathew Knowles – executive producer
- Solange Knowles – additional vocal production (track 7), songwriting (track 7)
- Tina Knowles – styling direction
- Quincy S. Jackson - marketing
- Lil Wayne – songwriting (track 2), vocals (track 2)
- Fabian Marasciullo – additional vocal engineering (track 2)
- Tony Maserati – mixing (tracks 1, 3, 9 and 11)
- Gene McFadden – songwriting (track 5)
- Fonce Mizell – songwriting (track 9)
- Larry Mizell – songwriting (track 9)
- Huy Nguyen – A&R
- Dave Pensado – mixing (tracks 5, 6 and 8)
- Eddie Robinson – songwriting (track 6)
- Mally Roncal – make-up
- Kelly Rowland – additional vocal production (tracks 1, 3 and 6), backing vocals (all tracks), executive production, lead vocals (all tracks), songwriting (all tracks)
- Ric Rude – instrumentation (track 3), production (track 3) songwriting (track 3)
- Dexter Simmons – mixing (tracks 2 and 10)
- Rudy Sotomayor – make-up
- Tim "Timmy Shakes" Stewart – guitar (track 3)
- Dana "Rockwilder" Stinson – production (tracks 8 and 9), songwriting (tracks 8 and 9)
- Phil Tan – mixing (track 7)
- Tom Tapley – additional vocal engineering (track 2)
- Sam Thomas – additional Pro-Tools editing (track 7)
- T.I. – songwriting (track 2), vocals (track 2)
- Jeff Villanueva – engineering (tracks 1 and 3)
- Rommel Nino Villanueva – additional Pro-Tools Editing (tracks 2 and 8)
- Robert Waller – songwriting (track 3)
- John Whitehead – songwriting (track 5)
- Teresa LaBarbera Whites – A&R
- Erron Williams – production (track 11), songwriting (track 11)
- Michelle Williams – additional vocal production (track 3), backing vocals (all tracks), executive production, lead vocals (tracks 1–6 and 8–11), songwriting (tracks 1–6 and 8–11)
- Mario Winans – production (track 10), songwriting (track 10)
- Juanita Wynn – vocal production (track 8)
- Marvin Yancy – songwriting (track 8)

== Charts ==
=== Weekly charts ===
Weekly chart performance
Chart (2004)	Peak position
Australian Albums (ARIA)	11
Australian Urban Albums (ARIA)	1
Austrian Albums (Ö3 Austria)	8
Belgian Albums (Ultratop Flanders)	13
Belgian Albums (Ultratop Wallonia)	20
Canadian Albums (Billboard)	3
Canadian R&B Albums (Nielsen SoundScan)	2
Danish Albums (Hitlisten)	11
Dutch Albums (Album Top 100)	4
European Top 100 Albums (Billboard)	5
Finnish Albums (Suomen virallinen lista)	33
French Albums (SNEP)	9
German Albums (Offizielle Top 100)	3
Irish Albums (IRMA)	5
Italian Albums (FIMI)	43
Japanese Albums (Oricon)	4
New Zealand Albums (RMNZ)	21
Norwegian Albums (VG-lista)	12
Polish Albums (ZPAV)	36
Scottish Albums (Official Charts)	11
Spanish Albums (Promusicae)	7
Swedish Albums (Sverigetopplistan)	20
Swiss Albums (Schweizer Hitparade)	3
UK Albums (Official Charts)	5
UK R&B Albums (Official Charts)	2
US Billboard 200	2
US Top R&B/Hip-Hop Albums (Billboard)	1

=== Year-end charts ===
2004 year-end chart performance
Chart (2004)	Position
Australian Urban Albums (ARIA)	16
Belgian Albums (Ultratop Flanders)	91
Dutch Albums (Album Top 100)	72
French Albums (SNEP)	172
Swiss Albums (Schweizer Hitparade)	77
Worldwide Albums (IFPI)	8

2005 year-end chart performance
Chart (2005)	Position
Australian Albums (ARIA)	51
Australian Urban Albums (ARIA)	7
Belgian Albums (Ultratop Flanders)	78
Dutch Albums (Album Top 100)	96
German Albums (Offizielle Top 100)	86
Japanese Albums (Oricon)	24
Swiss Albums (Schweizer Hitparade)	66
US Billboard 200	7
US Top R&B/Hip Hop Albums (Billboard)	3

=== Decade-end charts ===
2000s decade-end chart performance
Chart (2000–2009)	Position
US Billboard 200	133

== Certifications ==
Certifications and sales
Region	Certification	Certified units/sales
Australia (ARIA)	Platinum	70,000^{^}
Canada (Music Canada)	Platinum	100,000^{^}
Germany (BVMI)	Platinum	200,000^{^}
Japan (RIAJ)	Platinum	600,000
New Zealand (RMNZ)	Platinum	15,000^{‡}
Spain (Promusicae)	Gold	50,000^{^}
Switzerland (IFPI Switzerland)	Gold	20,000^{^}
United Kingdom (BPI)	2× Platinum	600,000^{‡}
United States (RIAA)	3× Platinum	3,000,000^{^}
Summaries
Europe (IFPI)	Platinum	1,000,000^{*}
Worldwide	—	7,000,000
^{*} Sales figures based on certification alone.^{^} Shipments figures based on certification alone.^{‡} Sales+streaming figures based on certification alone.

== Release history ==
Release dates and formats
Region	Date	Format(s)	Label(s)	Ref.
United States	November 8, 2004	Streaming (Note: exclusive to MTV)	Columbia; Sony Urban	
Japan	November 10, 2004	CD	Sony Japan	
Australia	November 12, 2004	CD	Sony BMG	
Denmark	November 12, 2004	CD	Sony BMG	
United States	November 12, 2004	CD (Note: exclusive to Trans World and Walmart)	Columbia; Sony Urban	
Germany	November 15, 2004	CD	Sony BMG	
United Kingdom	November 15, 2004	CD	Columbia	
United States	November 15, 2004	CD	Columbia; Sony Urban	
United States	November 16, 2004	Double CD	Columbia; Sony Urban	
United States	February 8, 2005	DualDisc	Columbia; Sony Urban	
Japan	April 6, 2005	CD+DVD	Sony Japan	
Netherlands	April 11, 2005	CD+DVD	Sony BMG	
Australia	April 15, 2005	CD+DVD	Sony BMG	
United Kingdom	May 2, 2005	CD+DVD	Columbia	

== See also ==
- Destiny's Child discography
- List of Billboard number-one R&B/hip-hop albums of 2004
- List of Billboard number-one R&B/hip-hop albums of 2005
- List of best-selling girl group albums
