= Soldier (Destiny's Child song) =

2004 single by Destiny's Child

Single by Destiny's Child featuring T.I. and Lil Wayne

from the album Destiny Fulfilled
- B-side: "Lose My Breath"
- Released: November 8, 2004
- Recorded: 2004
- Studio: Sony (New York)
- Genre: Southern hip-hop
- Length: 5:25
- Label: Columbia; Sony Urban
- Songwriters: Sean Garrett; Rich Harrison; Beyoncé Knowles; Kelly Rowland; Michelle Williams; Dwayne Carter; Clifford Harris
- Producers: Rich Harrison; Beyoncé Knowles

Destiny's Child singles chronology
"Lose My Breath" (2004)	"Soldier" (2004)	"Girl" (2005)

T.I. singles chronology
"Bring Em Out" (2004)	"Soldier" (2004)	"U Don’t Know Me" (2005)

Lil Wayne singles chronology
"Hot Girls" (2004)	"Soldier" (2004)	"Get Your Shine On" (2005)

Music video
- "Soldier" on YouTube

"Soldier" is a song recorded by American group Destiny's Child, featuring American rappers T.I. and Lil Wayne, for the group's final studio album Destiny Fulfilled (2004). The artists wrote the song with Sean Garrett and Rich Harrison who produced it with the latter co-produced it with Beyoncé. A Southern hip-hop mid-tempo song, it lyrically describes each member's favorite type of male love interest. The song was released as the second single from Destiny Fulfilled on November 8, 2004, by Columbia Records and Sony Urban Music.

"Soldier" received mostly positive reviews from music critics, who praised its composition and the trio's vocal performances, but criticized the lyrical content. The song received a nomination in the category for Best Rap/Sung Collaboration at the 48th Annual Grammy Awards and won Best R&B/Soul Single by a Group, Band or Duo at the 2005 Soul Train Music Awards. A commercial success, "Soldier" peaked within the top five in six European countries and in Australia, being certified gold in the latter region. In the United States, it peaked at number three on the Billboard Hot 100 and topped the Dance Club Play chart, receiving a platinum certification from the Recording Industry Association of America (RIAA).

The black-and-white music video directed by Ray Kay featured cameo appearances by several rappers and singers. It was nominated at the 2005 MTV Video Music Awards in the category of Best Group Video. The band performed "Soldier" on several televised appearances in 2004 and 2005 and included it on the set list of their final tour Destiny Fulfilled... And Lovin' It (2005). Both Beyoncé and Kelly Rowland performed the song during their solo tours after Destiny's Child's disbandment. The song was sampled in many songs by different artists, most notably by Nelly, Paul Wall and Ali & Gipp on their single "Grillz" (2005).

== Writing and production ==
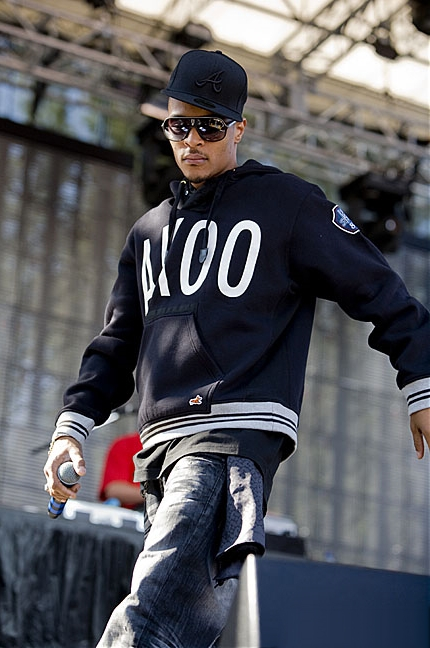
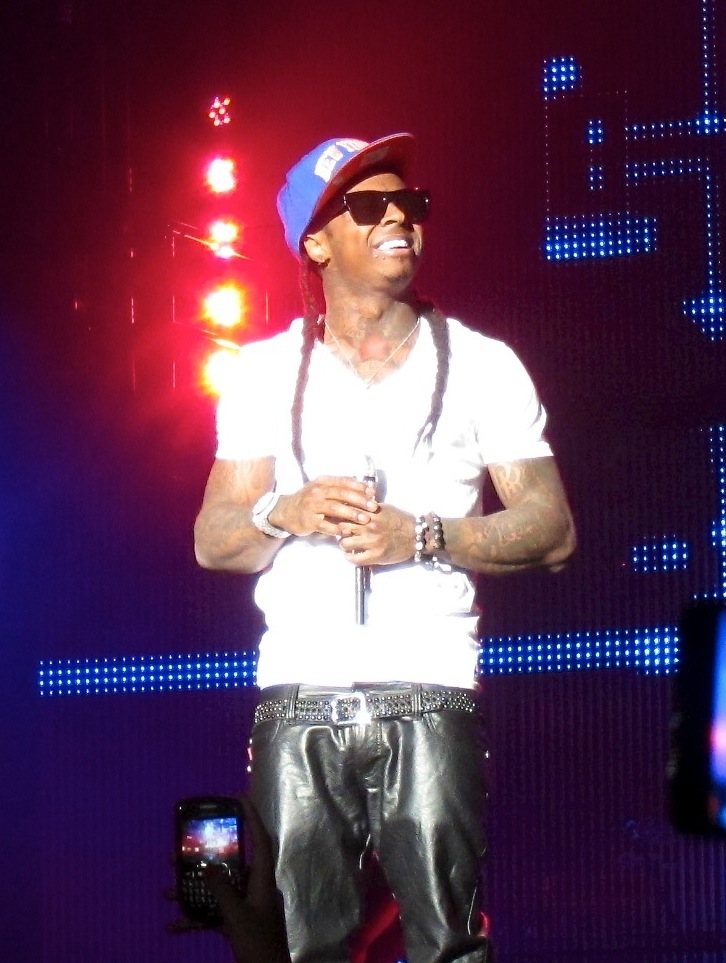
American rappers T.I. (left) and Lil Wayne (right) are the featured artists on the song further serving as its co-writers.

Sean Garrett and Rich Harrison assisted the artists in writing the song "Soldier", with Harrison handling production alongside Destiny's Child member Beyoncé Knowles. It is the only song on the album to feature any guest performers. "Soldier" was recorded by Jim Caruana at Sony Music Studios in New York City in 2004, with mixing by Dexter Simmons and mastering by Tom Coyne. Garrett initially wrote "Soldier" in a taxi while going to the studio where the band worked on Destiny Fulfilled; he sang the hook to the members afterwards and they liked it. Garrett further revealed about his collaboration with the group, "I loved how Destiny's Child evolved and became this really incredible pop group but I wanted to introduce them to the hood from the perspective of having the world look at them in a different way... What was great about that was they all liked guys from the streets. Each verse was a representation of the guy they were actually into."

During an interview with MTV News, Rowland said that with "Soldier" each member wanted to talk about their preference for a man during their solo verses, the place where he lives and his physical appearance. Beyoncé stated that as the song had a "Southern feel" and beat, they wanted to collaborate with Lil Wayne and T.I. who according to her added "rawness, realness and edge to the song". During an interview in 2014, Lil Wayne discussed his contribution in the song, "That set me off. Them little eight bars right there, that got me there boy. If you ask me why, it was Beyoncé. That shit was big." "Soldier" was included on the group's compilation albums #1's (2005) and Playlist: The Very Best of Destiny's Child (2012).

== Music and lyrics ==
"Soldier" is a mid-tempo Southern hip-hop song; Alex MacPherson of Stylus Magazine further found elements of Crunk&B music while Kelefa Sanneh of The New York Times noted electropop elements in its composition. Discussing the song musically, Kitty Empire from The Observer classified it as a "ghetto anthem-in-waiting that echoes the Southern bent of much contemporary hip-hop". According to the sheet music published on the website Musicnotes.com by Sony/ATV Music Publishing, "Soldier" was composed using common time in the key of C minor with a pulsing hip-hop tempo of 75 beats per minute. The vocal elements span from the low note of G_{3} to the high note of F_{5}. The song is instrumentally complete with ticking staccato synths, fractured, syncopated keyboard instruments, organ stabs, and off-kilter kick drums. Pitchfork Media's Tom Breihan felt that its beat was similar to materials by Dr. Dre. Dimitri Ehrlich from Vibe found major influence of Jay-Z in "Soldier" further saying that "T.I. and Lil Wayne... seem like stand-ins for Hova".

"Soldier"
A 24-second sample of "Soldier" featuring Destiny's Child chanting the lines "I know some soldiers in here/Where they at? Where they at?"

Lyrically, "Soldier" is a continuation of the previous song on Destiny Fulfilled, "Lose My Breath". As the singers feel that their man does not fulfill them in the way they want, they tell him "I need a soldier", further "upping their standards". They request their man to be a "thug", proclaiming their love for "country boys"; their preference include a "soldier" who is "street" and "hood". MacPherson further felt that the trio cruised the ghetto for suitable men with "Soldier", an "ode to gangsta love". Corey Moss of MTV felt that the song was one of the most personal moments on Destiny Fulfilled in the sense that Beyoncé's then-relatively secret relationship with rapper Jay-Z was acknowledged "on record for the first time". Moss further elaborated, "Albeit minor, her [Beyoncé's] verse (about falling for a guy from the BK, as in Jay's Brooklyn stomping grounds) offers a rare moment of commentary on the couple, which has thus far only been chronicled by tabloid photographers." The song opens with T.I. rhyming lines and glorifying the profound love "between a thug and a thugette". As the song progresses, each member of Destiny's Child describes their own favorite type of man, later harmonizing together for the chorus. Midway through the song, Lil Wayne's verse contains a reference to rapper B.G. Michelle Williams is the last artist to sing her solo lines, which were described as "the sexiest" by Rashod Ollisong of The Baltimore Sun.

== Critical reception ==
Stephen Thomas Erlewine from the website AllMusic described "Soldier" as one of the "hard-driving dance cuts" of Destiny Fulfilled further choosing it as a highlight. Similarly, Alex MacPherson of Stylus Magazine wrote in his review that "[The album] shoots its load quickly, although just as effectively: 'Lose My Breath' and 'Soldier' are stunning, both displaying the Beyoncé trademark of creepily submissive lyrics matched with dominatrix vocals and arrangements to superb effect." MacPherson continued praising the song's slow "contemptuous grind" and the singers' vocal delivery further concluding that T.I. and Wayne "get comprehensively owned". The New York Times writer Kelefa Sanneh described the track as part of the album's "lovable" material and went on saying, "[it] takes a ludicrous premise... and turns it into sharp, coldblooded electro-pop". Andy Battaglia writing for The A.V. Club felt that the song and "Cater 2 U" "make sassy end-runs around notions of womanly subservience, but their best musical moments hide in tiny melismatic twirls instead of hooks". The Guardian writer Caroline Sullivan described the track as "juddering" while BBC's Nick Reynolds called it "good fun". In a review of the song, Tom Breihan, an editor of Pitchfork Media, wrote that "Soldier" would have been a "perfectly acceptable album track" on The Writing's on the Wall (1999), but noted that its sound was different from the songs played on mainstream pop radio. Praising the trio for their vocal performances, he continued:

"'Soldier' might not carry with it the shock of the new, but it's still a nice little single... The women of Destiny's Child don't sound the slightest bit convincing singing about how they need thug boyfriends, but they wind their voices around a gorgeous hook exactly as well as they always have. T.I. and Lil Wayne stop by, not saying anything but sounding cool and tough and unflappable doing it. It's pretty good, but don't expect it to set your world on fire."

Barbara Ellen of The Observer said the song was "of the exemplary standard" of the band's previous albums, Survivor (2001) and The Writing's on the Wall. Describing it as an "overt bid for street cred", Entertainment Weekly's Tom Sinclair felt that T.I and Lil Wayne "bring little to the party" with their contribution to the song. Erika Ramirez and Jason Lipshutz writing for Billboard magazine felt that the group "cemented their street and chart credibility" with the song. Another reviewer from the same magazine felt that the band's "personal transition from teen-dom to womanhood" was most evident on "Soldier" and two other songs from the album. Jenny Eliscu from Rolling Stone wrote in her review, "It's a hot track, even if the message feels affected coming from these church girls." For the same reason, Vibe writer Dimitri Ehrlich described it as a Broadway show tune about thug life. Gil Kaufman from MTV News described the song as a "bouncy homage to thug love that featured the signature DC mix of urban grit and slick production". Rashod Ollisong writing for The Baltimore Sun gave a more mixed review for the song, writing "It is catchy, but the beat is trite, and the lyrical message is downright trifling" before adding that it glorifies a "warped" image of black masculinity which he heavily criticized. He further argued that the group "should put more thought into their lyrics" due to the background and image each member created throughout their career.

== Accolades ==
"Soldier" won in the category for Best R&B/Soul Single by a Group, Band or Duo during the 2005 Soul Train Music Awards. At the 48th Annual Grammy Awards, the song received a nomination for Best Rap/Sung Collaboration but lost to "Numb/Encore" (2004) by Jay-Z and Linkin Park. At the 23rd Annual ASCAP Pop Music Awards, "Soldier" was recognized as one of the Most Performed Songs in 2005 along with the group's other song "Lose My Breath". The following year it was one of the Award Winning R&B/Hip-Hop Songs at the 2006 ASCAP Rhythm & Soul Music Awards.

In 2013, Lindsey Weber from Vulture put "Soldier" at number nine on her list of the top 25 songs by Destiny's Child. Houston Chronicle's Joey Guerra also included the song in his 2013 list of the band's best songs. The same year it was ranked at number 64 on a list compiled by Andrew Noz from Complex magazine of Lil Wayne's 100 best songs. Similarly, Emily Exton from VH1 listed "Soldier" at the 19th position of T.I.'s 20 best songs praising his "hot intro verse". On the occasion of Beyoncé's 32nd birthday, Erika Ramirez and Jason Lipshutz from Billboard included "Soldier" at number 15 on the list of "Beyonce's 30 Biggest Billboard Hits".

== Commercial performance ==
After debuting on the chart for the week ending November 20, 2004, "Soldier" moved to number 41 on the US Billboard Hot 100 the following week. For the week ending December 10, the single moved from number 14 to number ten, becoming the group's tenth and last top-ten single on the chart. It peaked at number three on the Billboard Hot 100 for the week ending February 12, 2005, becoming the second single from Destiny Fulfilled to peak at that position and was group last top-ten single on the Billboard Hot 100. It fell from the top ten of the chart for the issue dated March 5, 2005, after its position of number eight the previous week, thus spending a total of nine weeks within the top ten. Having spent a total of 23 weeks on the chart, "Soldier" was last seen at number 32. The single was also successful on several other Billboard charts; on the Dance Club Play chart, it debuted at number 51 on the issue dated January 15, 2005, and managed to peak at number one in its sixth week for the issue dated February 26, 2005. "Soldier" further peaked at numbers three and four on the US Hot R&B/Hip-Hop Singles & Tracks and Mainstream Top 40 charts dated January 1, 2005, and February 12, 2005, respectively. On May 18, 2005, the Recording Industry Association of America (RIAA) certified the single gold for selling 500,000 digital copies in the United States. Its ringtone was further certified platinum on June 14, 2006, for shipments of one million copies.

"Soldier" was commercially successful in countries across Europe, peaking within the top ten in six countries. On the Danish Singles Chart, it debuted and peaked at number five on March 4, 2005. Having spent a total of ten weeks on the chart, of which four were in the top ten, it fell off on May 13. In Finland, the song debuted and peaked at number seven. In Switzerland, "Soldier" debuted at number 15 on February 20, 2004, and peaked at number ten after two weeks. It spent an additional week at that position and fell off the chart after 12 weeks. In the United Kingdom, the single debuted at number four on the UK Singles Chart on the issue dated February 19, 2005. It gradually descended the chart, spending a total of seven weeks. On the Irish Singles Chart, the single debuted and peaked at number six on February 10, 2005. It also peaked at numbers 12 and 28 in Spain and France, respectively.

In Australia, "Soldier" debuted and peaked at number three on the ARIA Singles Chart on February 20, 2005. It fell to numbers seven and eight, respectively, in the following two weeks and descended the chart for ten additional weeks before falling off on May 15, 2005. The Australian Recording Industry Association (ARIA) awarded the single with a gold certification in 2005 for shipments of 35,000 copies in the country. "Soldier" had similar success on the New Zealand Singles Chart, where it peaked at number four on February 21, 2005, and remained at that position for the following three weeks. It further spent the following four weeks within the top ten and fell off on May 23, 2005. In 2005, the Recording Industry Association of New Zealand (RIANZ) certified it gold for selling 5,000 copies in the country.

== Music video ==
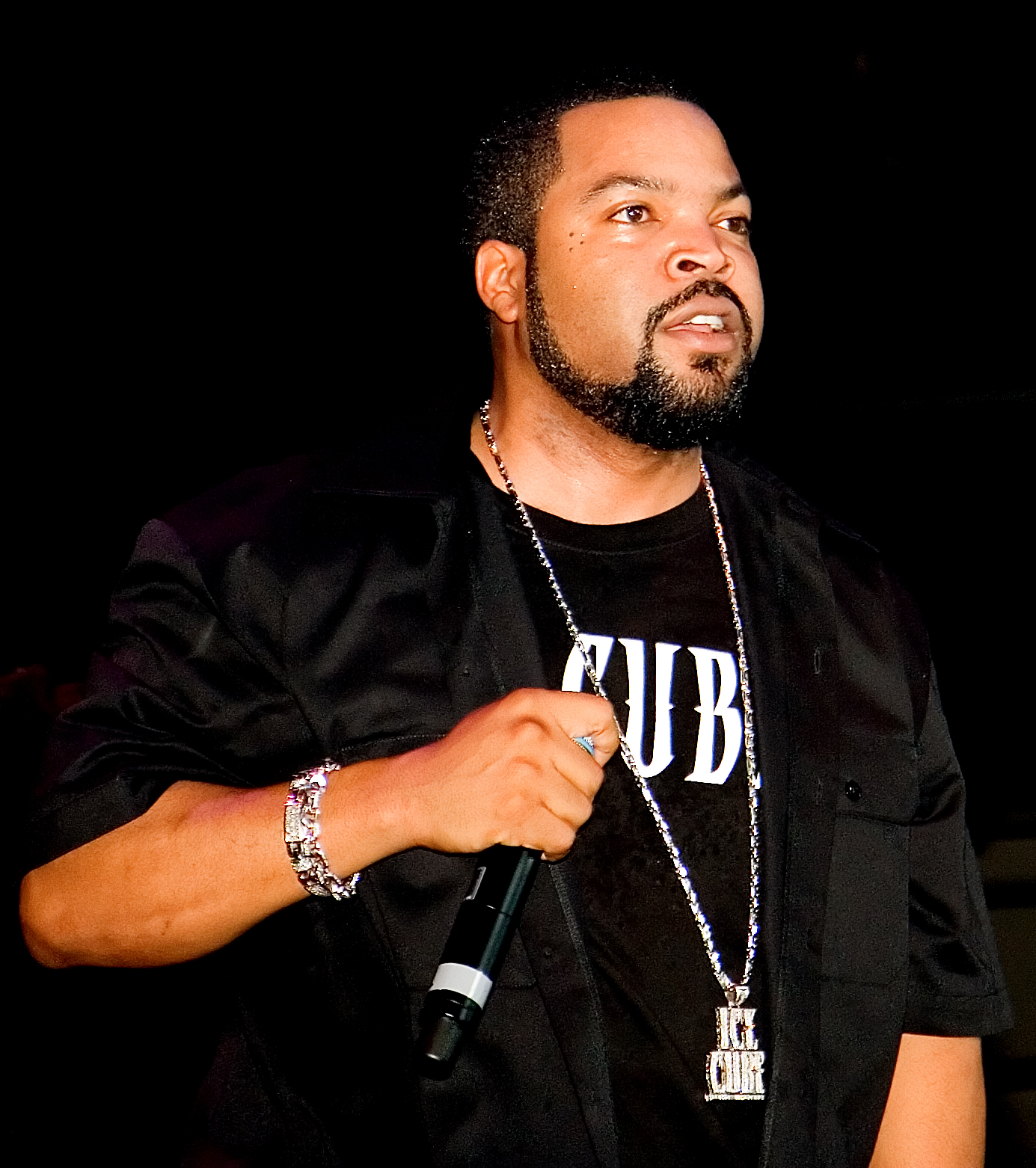
Hip hop artist Ice Cube (pictured) is one of the artists that make a cameo appearance in the music video for "Soldier".

The music video for "Soldier" was filmed by Norwegian director Ray Kay and was shot in black-and-white, becoming the band's first clip using that technique. It marked the first time the group worked with Kay. During an interview, they praised him for shooting the scenes in a fast and convenient way, further describing the experience as "wonderful". The video features cameo appearances by seven singers and rappers: Beyoncé's sister Solange Knowles, Luke James, Lloyd, Bow Wow, Ginuwine, Ice Cube, WC and Young Jeezy.

The video opens with Destiny's Child walking between two rows of males intertwined with close-up shots of each member's face. T.I. appears rapping his part wearing a hat, sunglasses and chains. As the song progresses, the members are seen dancing along with the males in the background who also pose for the camera. During the middle of the video, the girls are seen walking with leashed dogs in their hands and Lil Wayne appears rapping his part afterwards. The camera focuses on each member during their solo part in the song as they perform a dance choreography and lip-sync the lyrics. During the end of the video, as the group sings the lines "known to carry big things", they rub the belly of Solange Knowles, who was pregnant at the time of shooting. The clip ends with the girls holding the previously seen dogs in their hands. Throughout the visual, shots of three cars with different registrations are shown – a Cadillac from Georgia with the words "Da Durty", another car from New York City with the words "BK Style" and a third car from California with the word "Crenshaw".

The music video was released on MTV on November 8, 2004. It is also featured on the DualDisc editions of the albums #1's and Destiny Fulfilled as well as on the bonus DVD of the Destiny Fulfilled Tour edition. VH1 aired the video during the program Pop-Up Video on November 11, 2011, along with trivial commentary. In 2013 it was included on the album Video Anthology which contained nearly every music video the group had filmed during their career. Vulture's Lindsay Weber described the clip as "camouflage-heavy". The video was nominated at the 2005 MTV Video Music Awards under the category of Best Group Video but lost to Green Day's "Boulevard of Broken Dreams" (2004).

== Live performances ==
In late 2004, the group performed "Soldier" with T.I. during MTV's Total Request Live (TRL). At BET's 106 & Park Destiny's Child performed "Soldier" on November 15, 2004. At the beginning of the performance, Michelle Williams fell onstage during the group's entrance. Williams addressed the incident during an interview in 2014, saying, "I had no choice but to get up and act like it didn't happen. Because of YouTube – 10 years later, at least once a week, somebody brings it to my attention." She added that it would be the last time she discussed the incident and acknowledged that although "it lives on forever" a lot of "great things" have happened to her since then. On November 16, 2004, another performance of the song was during the television show Good Morning America. Destiny's Child appeared on CBS' The Early Show on December 8, 2004, and sang "Soldier". The group performed the song again in early February 2005 at the British show Top of the Pops. At the 2005 NBA All-Star Game on February 20, 2005, they sang "Soldier" and "Lose My Breath". Destiny's Child also performed "Soldier" during the concert Rockin' the Corps in April 2005 with the performance being featured on a DVD.

In 2005, "Soldier" was added to the set list of Destiny's Child's final tour Destiny Fulfilled... and Lovin' It. The group performed it against a backdrop of the American flag dressed in leather clothes taken from Beyoncé's clothing line House of Deréon. The live rendition contained a sample from the song "Shout It Out" by Too Short and Bun B from the soundtrack of the 2002 film Drumline. Denise Sheppard writing for Rolling Stone felt that the drumline-affected version performed during the concert was "for the delighted, largely female crowd". While reviewing a concert in the UK, Adenike Adenitire of MTV News praised the group's surprising look inspired by Mad Max noting that they proved "that you don't need baggy jeans and a bandanna to be street". Similarly, Barbara Ellen from The Observer felt that the look was emulating "all the Mad Max movies at once". The song was included on the track listing of the group's live album Live in Atlanta (2006) chronicling a concert from the tour in that city for which T.I. and Wayne joined the band onstage performing their parts. It was also sung during Beyoncé's Coachella 2018 performance.

Following the group's disbandment, both Beyoncé and Rowland included "Soldier" in the set list of their respective solo tours. The former performed it with her male background dancers during a Destiny's Child medley at The Beyoncé Experience (2007) along with a snippet of Soulja Boy's "Crank That (Soulja Boy)" (2007). It was subsequently included on the singer's live DVD The Beyoncé Experience Live (2007) dubbed as "Soldier Boy Crank Mix". Rowland performed "Soldier" during her headlining concert tour Ms. Kelly Tour (2007), on several dates during Chris Brown's F.A.M.E. Tour (2011) where she appeared as a supporting act and during the co-headlining Lights Out Tour (2013) with The-Dream. She also performed "Soldier" on August 26, 2010, during a promotional concert in New York City and at the Australian Supafest festival in April 2012 backed by male dancers.

== Legacy ==
In 2005, American rapper Nelly sampled "Soldier" for his song "Grillz" (2005) featuring Paul Wall, and Ali & Gipp from the album Sweatsuit (2005). Mike Schiller from PopMatters wrote that Jermaine Dupri's production on the song was "uncharacteristically fantastic, finding a down 'n' dirty groove in the unlikely source material of Destiny's Child's 'Soldier'". The following year, "Only God" from JME's instrumental mixtape Boy Better Know – Edition 4: Tropical (2006) sampled the song. Hip-hop artist DJ Drama used a sample of the song in "Grillz Gleamin'", featuring Lil' Scrappy, Bohagon, Diamond and Princess, from his album Gangsta Grillz: The Album (2007). "Soldier" was also sampled for "Body Marked Up" (2009) by Willy Northpole, the first single from his debut album Tha Connect.

== Track listing and formats ==
- Australian and New Zealand single

No.	Title	Length
1.	"Soldier" (Album version)	5:26
2.	"Soldier" (Maurice's Nu Soul Mix)	7:15
3.	"Soldier" (Maurice's Nu Beat Mix)	6:11
4.	"Soldier" (Danny Howells & Dick Trevor's Kinkyfunk Mix)	6:28
5.	"Lose My Breath" (Peter Rauhofer's Breathless Club Mix)	9:14

- European single

No.	Title	Length
1.	"Soldier" (album version)	5:26
2.	"Soldier" (Maurice's Nu Soul Mix)	7:15
3.	"Soldier" (Danny Howells & Dick Trevor's Kinkyfunk Mix)	6:28
4.	"Soldier" (Grizz Blackmarket Remix)	5:22
5.	"Lose My Breath" (Peter Rauhofer's Breathless Club Mix)	9:14
6.	"Soldier" (Music video)	4:05

- French single

No.	Title	Length
1.	"Soldier" (album version)	5:26
2.	"Soldier" (Mix Inédit featuring Rohff)	4:06
3.	"Survivor"	4:10

- German "Pock It!" single (3 inch)

No.	Title	Length
1.	"Soldier" (album version)	5:26
2.	"Lose My Breath" (Peter Rauhofer's Breathless Club Mix)	9:14

- UK CD single 1

No.	Title	Length
1.	"Soldier" (radio edit)	4:06
2.	"Soldier" (Kardinal Beats Remix)	3:47

- UK CD single 2

No.	Title	Length
1.	"Soldier" (radio edit)	4:06
2.	"Soldier" (Maurice's Nu Anthem Mix)	7:28
3.	"Soldier" (Danny Howells & Dick Trevor's Kinkyfunk Mix)	6:28
4.	"Soldier" (JS Remix)	5:42
5.	"Soldier" (Music video)	4:05

- US single EP

No.	Title	Length
1.	"Soldier" (album version)	5:26
2.	"Soldier" (Grizz Blackmarket Remix)	5:22
3.	"Soldier" (Bizarre Remix feat. Bizarre of D-12)	5:00
4.	"Soldier" (Maurice's Nu Soul Mix)	7:15
5.	"Soldier" (Danny Howells & Dick Trevor's Kinkyfunk Mix)	6:28

- US 2-track single

No.	Title	Length
1.	"Soldier" (album version)	5:26
2.	"Soldier" (Grizz Blackmarket Remix)	5:22

== Credits and personnel ==
Credits are adapted from the liner notes of the album Destiny Fulfilled.

- Lead vocals: Beyoncé Knowles, Kelly Rowland and Michelle Williams
- Vocal production: Beyoncé Knowles and Kelly Rowland
- Recording: Jim Caruna at Sony Music Studios, New York City
- Additional vocals: Tom Tapley and Fabian Marasciullo
- Audio mixing: Dexter Simmons
- Additional Pro Tools Editing: Rommel Nino Villanueva
- Audio mastering: Tom Coyne

== Charts ==
=== Weekly charts ===
Weekly chart performance for "Soldier"
Chart (2004–2005)	Peak position
Australia (ARIA)	3
Austria (Ö3 Austria Top 40)	25
Belgium (Ultratop 50 Flanders)	18
Belgium (Ultratop 50 Wallonia)	35
Canada CHR/Pop Top 30 (Radio & Records)	8
Czech Republic (Rádio – Top 100)	33
Denmark (Tracklisten)	5
European Hot 100 Singles (Billboard)	5
Finland (Suomen virallinen lista)	7
France (SNEP)	28
Germany (GfK)	11
Ireland (IRMA)	6
Italy (FIMI)	7
Netherlands (Dutch Top 40)	10
Netherlands (Single Top 100)	13
New Zealand (Recorded Music NZ)	4
Norway (VG-lista)	15
Romania (Romanian Top 100)	12
Scottish Singles Sales (Official Charts)	5
Spain (Promusicae)	12
Sweden (Sverigetopplistan)	27
Switzerland (Schweizer Hitparade)	10
UK Singles (Official Charts)	4
UK Hip Hop/R&B (Official Charts)	2
US Billboard Hot 100	3
US Dance Club Songs (Billboard) Remixes	1
US Dance Singles Sales (Billboard) with "Lose My Breath"	2
US Hot R&B/Hip-Hop Songs (Billboard)	3
US Pop Airplay (Billboard)	4
US Rhythmic Airplay (Billboard)	4

=== Year-end charts ===
Year-end chart performance for "Soldier"
Chart (2005)	Position
Australia (ARIA)	50
European Hot 100 Singles (Billboard)	100
Netherlands (Dutch Top 40)	92
New Zealand (RIANZ)	35
Romania (Romanian Top 100)	15
Switzerland (Schweizer Hitparade)	74
UK Singles (OCC)	112
UK Urban (Music Week)	27
US Billboard Hot 100	26
US Dance Singles Sales (Billboard)	6
US Hot R&B/Hip-Hop Songs (Billboard)	10
US Mainstream Top 40 (Billboard)	26
US Rhythmic Top 40 (Billboard)	19

== Certifications ==
Certifications and sales for "Soldier"
Region	Certification	Certified units/sales
Australia (ARIA)	Gold	35,000^{^}
New Zealand (RMNZ)	Platinum	30,000^{‡}
United Kingdom (BPI)	Gold	400,000^{‡}
United States (RIAA)	Platinum	1,000,000^{‡}
United States (RIAA) Mastertone	Platinum	1,000,000^{*}
^{*} Sales figures based on certification alone.^{^} Shipments figures based on certification alone.^{‡} Sales+streaming figures based on certification alone.

== Release history ==
Release dates and formats for "Soldier"
Region	Date	Format(s)	Label(s)	Ref.
United States	November 8, 2004	Contemporary hit radio	Columbia	
United States	December 7, 2004	Digital download (EP) (Note: double A-side with "Lose My Breath")	Columbia	
Australia	February 4, 2005	Maxi CD	Sony BMG	
Germany	February 7, 2005	Maxi CD	Sony BMG	
United Kingdom	February 7, 2005	12-inch vinyl; CD; maxi CD	Columbia	
United States	February 8, 2005	CD; maxi CD	Columbia; Sony Urban	
Denmark	February 21, 2005	Maxi CD	Sony BMG	
France	March 7, 2005	CD	Columbia	
United States	March 8, 2005	Digital download (EP)	Columbia	

== See also ==
- List of Billboard Hot 100 top 10 singles in 2005
- List of number-one dance singles of 2005 (U.S.)
- New Zealand Top 50 singles of 2005
