= Destiny Fulfilled... and Lovin' It =

2005 concert tour by Destiny's Child

- World tour by Destiny's Child
- Location: Asia; Europe; North America; Oceania
- Associated album: Destiny Fulfilled
- Start date: April 9, 2005
- End date: September 10, 2005
- Legs: 5
- No. of shows: 70

Destiny's Child concert chronology
- Destiny's Child World Tour (2002); Destiny Fulfilled... and Lovin' It (2005)

Destiny Fulfilled... and Lovin' It was the final concert tour by American female R&B trio Destiny's Child, that visited Asia, Australia, Europe and North America.

== Outline and premise ==
The tour kicked off in Hiroshima, Japan on April 9, 2005, and ended in Vancouver, British Columbia, on September 10, 2005. The tour was sponsored by McDonald's Corporation.

During the show, Destiny's Child sang many iconic tracks off of their second and third albums, Survivor (2001) and Destiny Fulfilled (2004), respectively; the group also performed "No, No, No" feat. Wyclef Jean, a popular single off of their self-titled debut album (1998), when the group was originally a quartet (and Williams had not yet joined). Notable performances during the concert included crowd favorites like "Say My Name", "Bug a Boo", "Bills Bills Bills", "Jumpin’, Jumpin'", "Survivor", "Independent Women", "Bootylicious", "Soldier" and "Lose My Breath". During each tour date's performance of "Cater 2 U", in which the women wore glamorous, floor-length gowns, three male fans from the audience were chosen to join Destiny's Child on-stage, seated in chairs as the trio "serenaded" them in a classy, respectful way.

In addition to the trio's group repertoire, Kelly Rowland, Michelle Williams and Beyoncé each performed songs from their respective solo careers, which were still largely in their early days, at the time, in 2005. Solo numbers by Rowland included her popular single "Dilemma" (a duet with rapper Nelly), from her debut album (2002) and "Bad Habit" from the group's album Destiny Fulfilled (2004). Williams performed "Do You Know", the title track of her second solo album (2004). Beyoncé performed "Baby Boy" (with Sean Paul), "Crazy in Love", Naughty Girl" and the title track of her debut album, Dangerously in Love (2003).

Although the stage design afforded 360° viewing when setup inside the typical arena, most of the American dates were performed at outdoor amphitheatres. Several interludes featuring the show's dancers allowed for the group's costume changes; the outfits, often glittering gowns, were designed by Tina Knowles, Beyoncé's mother, and manufactured by her label House of Deréon. A special set of outfits was designed in tribute to the Broadway musical and film (starring Beyoncé) Dreamgirls, hinting at the play's "One Night Only (Disco)" scene where Deena Jones & the Dreams wear the same color pants suits.

=== Split-up announcement ===
On June 11, 2005, during the last performance of their European tour, in Barcelona, Kelly Rowland announced: "This is the last time you would see us on stage as Destiny's Child".

We have been working together as Destiny's Child since we were 9, and touring together since we were 14. After a lot of discussion and some deep soul searching, we realized that our current tour has given us the opportunity to leave Destiny's Child on a high note, united in our friendship and filled with an overwhelming gratitude for our music, our fans, and each other. After all these wonderful years working together, we realized that now is the time to pursue our personal goals and solo efforts in earnest. ... No matter what happens, we will always love each other as friends and sisters and will always support each other as artists. We want to thank all of our fans for their incredible love and support and hope to see you all again as we continue fulfilling our destinies.

The announcement was surprising to many, as the trio had downplayed rumors of a split in the wake of Knowles' success, although prior plans had called for the members to focus on solo projects at the end of the tour.

== Broadcasts and recordings ==
A performance from the tour was filmed in Atlanta at Philips Arena on July 15, 2005, and the resulting DVD Live in Atlanta was released on March 28, 2006. RIAA subsequently certified the DVD as Platinum. The concert was also aired in the USA on BET as a television special, on Channel 4 in the UK and on the Dutch television channel AT5.

== Opening acts ==
- Amerie (North America—select shows)
- Mario (North America—select shows)
- Darine Hadchiti (Dubai)
- Tyra B. (North America—select shows)
- Teairra Marí (New York City and Uniondale, NY)
- Keshia Chanté (Montreal and Toronto)
- Chris Brown (Columbus, 8/13/2005)
- Frankie J (Chula Vista, 8/30/2005)

== Set list ==
1. "Say My Name"
2. "Independent Women, Part I"
3. "No, No, No, Part 2"
4. "Bug a Boo"
5. "Bills, Bills, Bills"
6. "Bootylicious"
7. "Jumpin', Jumpin'"
8. "Soldier" (contains elements of "Shout It Out")
9. "Dilemma" (Kelly Rowland solo)
10. "Do You Know" (Michelle Williams solo)
11. "Baby Boy" (Beyoncé solo)
12. "Naughty Girl" (Beyoncé solo)
13. "Cater 2 U"
14. "Girl" (contains elements of "I'll Take You There")
15. "Free"
16. "If"
17. "Through With Love"
18. "Bad Habit" (Rowland solo)
19. "Dangerously in Love 2" (Beyoncé solo)
20. "Crazy in Love" (Beyoncé solo)
21. "Survivor"

Encore

22. "Lose My Breath"

== Tour dates ==
List of 2005 concerts
Date	City	Country	Venue
April 9, 2005	Hiroshima	Japan	Hiroshima Sun Plaza Hall
April 11, 2005	Osaka	Japan	Osaka-jō Hall
April 12, 2005	Nagoya	Japan	Nagoya Rainbow Hall
April 14, 2005	Tokyo	Japan	Budokan Hall
April 15, 2005	Tokyo	Japan	Budokan Hall
April 16, 2005	Yokohama	Japan	Yokohama Arena
April 27, 2005	Brisbane	Australia	Brisbane Entertainment Centre
April 28, 2005	Sydney	Australia	Sydney SuperDome
April 29, 2005	Adelaide	Australia	Adelaide Entertainment Centre
April 30, 2005	Melbourne	Australia	Rod Laver Arena
May 12, 2005	Dubai	United Arab Emirates	Dubai Media City Amphitheatre
May 15, 2005	Oslo	Norway	Oslo Spektrum
May 17, 2005	Stockholm	Sweden	Stockholm Globe Arena
May 19, 2005	Hamburg	Germany	Color Line Arena
May 21, 2005	Stuttgart	Germany	Hanns-Martin-Schleyer-Halle
May 22, 2005	Hasselt	Belgium	Ethias Arena
May 23, 2005	Rotterdam	Netherlands	Sportpaleis and Ahoy
May 24, 2005	Rotterdam	Netherlands	Sportpaleis and Ahoy
May 26, 2005	Milan	Italy	FilaForum di Assago
May 27, 2005	Geneva	Switzerland	SEG Geneva Arena
May 28, 2005	Paris	France	Palais Omnisports de Paris-Bercy
May 30, 2005	Frankfurt	Germany	Festhalle Frankfurt
May 31, 2005	Cologne	Germany	Kölnarena
June 2, 2005	London	England	Earls Court Exhibition Centre
June 3, 2005	London	England	Earls Court Exhibition Centre
June 5, 2005	Birmingham	England	National Indoor Arena
June 6, 2005	Manchester	England	Manchester Evening News Arena
June 7, 2005	Sheffield	England	Hallam FM Arena
June 9, 2005	Dublin	Ireland	Lansdowne Road
June 11, 2005	Barcelona	Spain	Palau Sant Jordi
July 2, 2005 (Note: The July 2 show in New Orleans was part of the Essence Music Festival.)	New Orleans	United States	Louisiana Superdome
July 9, 2005	Saint Louis	United States	Savvis Center
July 10, 2005	Memphis	United States	FedExForum
July 12, 2005	Nashville	United States	Gaylord Entertainment Center
July 15, 2005	Atlanta	United States	Philips Arena
July 16, 2005	Tampa	United States	St. Pete Times Forum
July 17, 2005	Sunrise	United States	Office Depot Center
July 20, 2005	Pittsburgh	United States	Mellon Arena
July 22, 2005	Charlotte	United States	Verizon Wireless Amphitheater
July 23, 2005	Virginia Beach	United States	Verizon Wireless Amphitheater
July 24, 2005	Raleigh	United States	Alltel Pavilion
July 28, 2005	Albany	United States	Pepsi Arena
July 29, 2005	New York City	United States	Madison Square Garden
July 30, 2005	Uniondale	United States	Nassau Veterans Memorial Coliseum
July 31, 2005	Washington, D.C.	United States	Verizon Center
August 3, 2005	Uncasville	United States	Mohegan Sun Arena
August 5, 2005	Philadelphia	United States	Wachovia Center
August 6, 2005	Boston	United States	TD Banknorth Garden
August 7, 2005	Hershey	United States	Giant Center
August 9, 2005	Montreal	Canada	Bell Centre
August 10, 2005	Toronto	Canada	Air Canada Centre
August 12, 2005	Cleveland	United States	Quicken Loans Arena
August 13, 2005	Columbus	United States	Nationwide Arena
August 14, 2005	Auburn Hills	United States	The Palace of Auburn Hills
August 16, 2005	Chicago	United States	Charter One Pavilion
August 19, 2005	San Antonio	United States	SBC Center
August 20, 2005	Houston	United States	Toyota Center
August 21, 2005	Dallas	United States	American Airlines Center
August 23, 2005	Denver	United States	Pepsi Center
August 26, 2005	Las Vegas	United States	Mandalay Bay Events Center
August 27, 2005	Phoenix	United States	America West Arena
August 28, 2005	Albuquerque	United States	Isleta Amphitheater
August 30, 2005	Chula Vista	United States	North Island Credit Union Amphitheatre
September 1, 2005	Anaheim	United States	Arrowhead Pond of Anaheim
September 2, 2005	Los Angeles	United States	Staples Center
September 3, 2005	Oakland	United States	Oakland Arena
September 4, 2005	San Jose	United States	HP Pavilion at San Jose
September 7, 2005	Spokane	United States	Spokane Veterans Memorial Arena
September 9, 2005	Seattle	United States	KeyArena
September 10, 2005	Vancouver	Canada	General Motors Place

=== Box office score data ===
Date	City	Country	Venue	Attendance	Revenue
July 10, 2005	Memphis	United States	FedEx Forum	8,793 / 14,370 (61%)	$432,265
July 15, 2005	Atlanta	United States	Philips Arena	10,742 / 13,844 (78%)	$640,262
July 17, 2005	Sunrise	United States	Office Depot Center	8,333 / 12,899 (65%)	$476,360
July 31, 2005	Washington D.C.	United States	MCI Center	12,573 / 15,581 (81%)	$795,893
July 30, 2005	Uniondale	United States	Nassau Veterans Memorial Coliseum	7,959 / 14,717 (54%)	$499,118
August 5, 2005	Philadelphia	United States	Wachovia Center	10,079 / 14,941 (67%)	$658,078
August 6, 2005	Boston	United States	TD Banknorth Garden	6,867 / 12,500 (55%)	$423,032
August 10, 2005	Toronto	Canada	Air Canada Centre	11,738 / 12,477 (94%)	$716,254
August 9, 2005	Montreal	Canada	Bell Centre	7,556 / 8,000 (94%)	$502,434
August 14, 2005	Auburn Hills	United States	Palace of Auburn Hills	8,544 / 13,760 (62%)	$493,357
August 20, 2005	Houston	United States	Toyota Center	11,896 / 13,035 (91%)	$778,156
August 21, 2005	Dallas	United States	American Airlines Center	9,465 / 9,979 (95%)	$534,423
August 26, 2005	Las Vegas	United States	Mandalay Bay Events Center	8,275 / 8,568 (96%)	$604,095
September 1, 2005	Anaheim	United States	Arrowhead Pond	8,519 / 11,396 (75%)	$555,973
September 2, 2005	Los Angeles	United States	Staples Center	13,841 / 13,841 (100%)	$822,817
September 3, 2005	Oakland	United States	Oakland Arena	8,895 / 11,996 (74%)	$646,360
September 10, 2005	Vancouver	Canada	General Motors Place	11,458 / 15,016 (76%)	$702,515

== Personnel ==
Creative Direction

- Beyoncé Knowles (Show Direction/Staging/Choreography)
- Kelly Rowland (Show Direction/Staging/Choreography)
- Michelle Williams (Show Direction/Staging/Choreography)
- Kim Burse (Creative Director)
- Frank Gatson Jr. (Show Direction/Creative Director/Choreography)

Choreographers

- Destiny's Child
- Frank Gatson Jr.
- LaVelle Smith Jr.

Production Manager

- Harold Jones

Wardrobe and Stylist

- Tina Knowles
- Ty Hunter (Assistant Stylist)

Tour Manager

- Alan Floyd
- Omar Grant (Assistant Tour Manager)

Band

- Lanar "Kern" Brantley (Musical Director, Bass)
- Shawn Carrington (Guitar)
- Jeff Motlet (Keyboards)
- Luke Austin (Keyboards)
- Gerald Heyward (Drums)

Dancers

- Anthony Burrell (Male Dance Captain)
- Aisha Francis (Female Dance Captain)
- Renece Fincher
- Melanie Lewis
- Sherman Shoate
- Kyausha Simpson
- Bryan Tanaka
- Robert Vinson
- Tyrell Washington
- Byron Carter

Security

- Richard Alexander

Tour Promoters

- Live Nation & Haymon Concerts – North America
- AEG Live – Europe

Tour sponsors

- McDonald's
- BET

== See also ==
- I'm Lovin' It campaign
- Justified and Lovin' It Live – an additional tour sponsored by McDonald's for the "I'm Lovin' It" campaign
- Live in Atlanta
