= List of awards and nominations received by Destiny's Child =

Destiny's Child awards and nominations
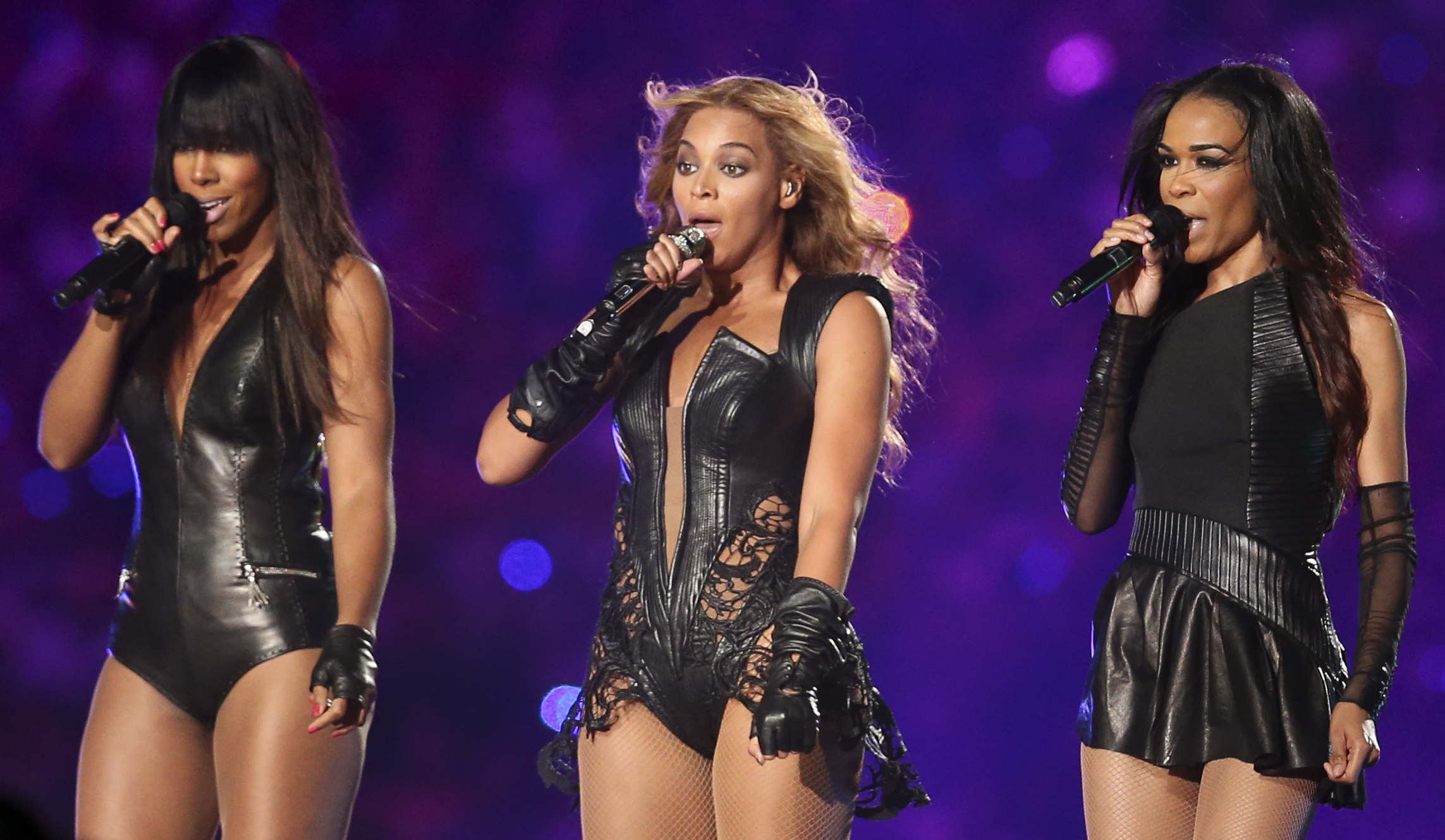
- Destiny's Child during the Super Bowl halftime show in 2013
Awards and nominations
Award	Wins	Nominations

Totals (Note: Certain award groups do not simply award one winner. They acknowledge several different recipients, have runners-up, and have third place. Since this is a specific recognition and is different from losing an award, runner-up mentions are considered wins in this award tally. For simplification and to avoid errors, each award in this list has been presumed to have had a prior nomination.)
- Wins: 121
- Nominations: 272

Destiny's Child was an American girl group whose final and best-known line-up comprised Beyoncé Knowles, Kelly Rowland, and Michelle Williams. Formed in 1990 in Houston, Texas, Destiny's Child members began their musical endeavors as Girl's Tyme, comprising, among others, Knowles, Rowland, LaTavia Roberson and LeToya Luckett. After years of limited success, they were signed in 1996 to Columbia Records as Destiny's Child. The group was launched into mainstream recognition following the 1999 release of their best-selling second album, The Writing's on the Wall, which contained the number-one singles "Bills, Bills, Bills" and "Say My Name". Their third album, Survivor, which contains themes the public interpreted as a channel to the group's experience, contains the worldwide hits "Independent Women", "Survivor" and "Bootylicious". In 2002, they announced a hiatus and re-united two years later for the release of their fourth and final studio album, Destiny Fulfilled (2004). Destiny's Child has sold more than 60 million records worldwide to date. Billboard magazine ranks the group as the ninth most successful artist/band of the 2000s, and placed the group 68th in its All-Time Hot 100 Artists list in 2008.

== American Music Awards ==
Year	Nominated work	Category	Result	Ref.
2001	Destiny's Child	Artist of the Year	Nominated	
2001	Destiny's Child	Favorite Soul/R&B Band/Duo/Group	Won	
2001	The Writing's on the Wall	Favorite Soul/R&B Album	Nominated	
2002	Destiny's Child	Artist of the Year	Nominated	
2002	Destiny's Child	Favorite Soul/R&B Band/Duo/Group	Won	
2002	Survivor	Favorite Pop/Rock Album	Won	
2005	Destiny's Child	Favorite Soul/R&B Band/Duo/Group	Won	
2005	Destiny Fulfilled	Favorite Soul/R&B Album	Won	

== ARTISTdirect ADOMA Awards ==
Year	Nominated work	Category	Result
2000	Destiny's Child	Favorite Group - Urban/Hip-Hop	Won

== BET Awards ==
Year	Nominated work	Category	Result	Ref.
2001	"Independent Women Part 1"	Video of the Year	Nominated	
2001	"Independent Women Part 1"	Viewer's Choice	Nominated	
2001	Destiny's Child	Best Group	Won	
2002	Destiny's Child	Best Group	Nominated	
2005	Destiny's Child	Best Group	Won	
2005	"Soldier" (feat. T.I. and Lil Wayne)	Best Collaboration	Nominated	
2005	"Soldier" (feat. T.I. and Lil Wayne)	Viewer's Choice	Nominated	
2006	Destiny's Child	Best Group	Nominated	

== Billboard ==
=== Billboard Music Awards ===
Year	Nominated work	Category	Result
2000	Destiny's Child	Artist of the Year	Won
2000	Destiny's Child	Duo/Group of the Year	Won
2000	Destiny's Child	Hot 100 Singles Artist of the Year	Won
2000	Destiny's Child	Hot 100 Singles Duo or Group of the Year	Won
2001	Destiny's Child	Artist of the Year	Won
2001	Destiny's Child	Duo/Group of the Year	Won
2001	Destiny's Child	Hot 100 Singles Artist of the Year	Won
2001	Destiny's Child	Hot 100 Singles Artist of the Year- Duo/Group	Won
2001	"Independent Women Part I"	Soundtrack Single of the Year	Won
2004	Destiny's Child	Artist Achievement Award	Won
2005	Destiny's Child	R&B/Hip-Hop Group of the Year	Won

=== Billboard R&B/Hip-Hop Awards ===
Year	Nominated work	Category	Result	Ref.
2005	Destiny's Child	Top R&B/Hip-Hop Duo or Group	Won	
2006	Destiny's Child	Top R&B/Hip-Hop Duo or Group	Won	

== Blockbuster Entertainment Awards ==
Year	Nominated work	Category	Result	Ref.
2000	Destiny's Child	Favorite R&B Group	Nominated	
2001	Destiny's Child	Favorite Group of the Year	Won	
2001	Destiny's Child	Favorite R&B Group	Won	
2001	Destiny's Child	Favorite Pop Group	Nominated	
2001	"Independent Women Part I"	Favorite Song from a Movie	Nominated	
2001	"Say My Name"	Favorite Single	Nominated	

== Bravo Otto Awards ==
Year	Nominated work	Category	Result
2000	Destiny's Child	Best Shooting Star - Female	Won
2001	Destiny's Child	Best Pop Band	Won

== BRIT Awards ==
The BRIT Awards are the British Phonographic Industry's annual pop music awards.

Year	Nominated work	Category	Result
2002	Destiny's Child	Best International Group	Won

== Capital FM Awards ==
Year	Nominated work	Category	Result
2008	Destiny's Child	Capital Icon Award	Won

== ECHO Awards ==
Year	Nominated work	Category	Result
2002	Destiny's Child	Best International Pop/Rock Group	Won

== Edison Awards ==
Year	Nominated work	Category	Result
2000	The Writing's on the Wall	Best R&B Act	Won
2001	Survivor	Best International Group	Won

== EMMA Awards ==
Year	Nominated work	Category	Result
2001	Destiny's Child	International Music Act	Won

== Glamour Awards ==
Year	Nominated work	Category	Result	Ref.
2005	Destiny's Child	Band of the Year	Won	

== Grammy Awards ==
Year	Nominated work	Category	Result	Ref.
2000	"Bills, Bills, Bills"	Best R&B Performance by a Duo or Group with Vocals	Nominated	
2000	"Bills, Bills, Bills"	Best R&B Song	Nominated	
2001	"Say My Name"	Record of the Year	Nominated	
2001	"Say My Name"	Song of the Year	Nominated	
2001	"Say My Name"	Best R&B Performance by a Duo or Group with Vocals	Won	
2001	"Say My Name"	Best R&B Song	Won	
2001	"Independent Women Part I"	Best Song Written for Visual Media	Nominated	
2002	"Survivor"	Best R&B Performance by a Duo or Group with Vocals	Won	
2002	Survivor	Best R&B Album	Nominated	
2005	"Lose My Breath"	Best R&B Performance by a Duo or Group with Vocals	Nominated	
2006	"Soldier" (feat. T.I. and Lil Wayne)	Best Rap/Sung Performance	Nominated	
2006	"Cater 2 U"	Best R&B Performance by a Duo or Group with Vocals	Nominated	
2006	"Cater 2 U"	Best R&B Song	Nominated	
2006	Destiny Fulfilled	Best Contemporary R&B Album	Nominated	

== Guinness World Records ==
Year	Nominated work	Category	Result
2001	"Independent Women Part I"	Longest-running number-one song on the Hot 100 by a girl group	Won

== Hip-Hop Summit Action Network Action Award ==
Year	Nominated work	Category	Result	Ref.
2005	Destiny's Child	Action Award	Won	

== Hong Kong Golden Disc Awards ==
Year	Nominated work	Category	Result	Ref.
2005	Destiny Fulfilled	Ten Best Sales Releases, Foreign	Won	
2006	Number 1's (Destiny's Child album)	Ten Best Sales Releases, Foreign	Won	

== Hollywood Walk of Fame ==
Year	Nominated work	Category	Result
2006	Destiny's Child	Recording Artists	Won

== Houston Press Music Awards ==
Year	Nominated work	Category	Result
1998	Destiny's Child	Best Funk/R&B	Won
1998	Destiny's Child	Critics' Choice - Funk/R&B	Won

== IFPI ==
=== IFPI Hong Kong Top Sales Music Awards ===
Year	Nominated work	Category	Result
2005	Destiny Fulfilled	Ten Best Sales Releases - Foreign	Won
2006	#1's	Ten Best Sales Releases - Foreign	Won

=== IFPI Platinum Europe Awards ===
Year	Nominated work	Category	Result
2000	The Writing's on the Wall	Platinum Award	Won
2001	The Writing's on the Wall	Platinum Award	Won
2001	Survivor	Platinum Award	Won
2003	Survivor	Platinum Award	Won
2004	The Writing's on the Wall	Platinum Award	Won
2004	Survivor	Platinum Award	Won

== International Dance Music Award ==
Year	Nominated work	Category	Result
2001	"Independent Women Part I"	Best Urban Song	Won

== Japan Gold Disc Award ==
Year	Nominated work	Category	Result
2001	The Platinum's on the Wall	International Music Video of the Year (Short Form)	Won
2005	Destiny Fulfilled	International Rock & Pop Album of the Year	Won
2006	#1's	International Rock & Pop Album of the Year	Won
2006	#1's	Movies Artists	Won

== Japan Radio Popular Disks Award ==
Year	Nominated work	Category	Result
2001	Destiny's Child	Best Vocal Duo/Group	Won
2005	Destiny's Child	Best Vocal Duo/Group	Won

== J-Wave Tokio Hot 100 Award ==
Year	Nominated work	Category	Result
2001	Destiny's Child	Best Group	Won

== McDonald's ==
Year	Nominated work	Category	Result
2001	Destiny's Child	Caring Hands, Caring Hearts Award	Won

== MOBO Awards ==
=== British MOBO Awards ===
Year	Nominated work	Category	Result
1999	Destiny's Child	Best International R&B Act	Won
2001	"Independent Women Part 1"	Best Single	Won

=== Dutch MOBO Awards ===
The first annual ceremony of the Netherlands' MOBO Awards was introduced in 2004, as a counterpart to the MOBO Awards of United Kingdom.

Year	Nominated work	Category	Result	Ref.
2005	Destiny Fulfilled	Best Album	Won	

== MTV ==
=== MTV Asia Music Awards ===
Year	Nominated work	Category	Result
2002	Destiny's Child	Favorite Pop Act - International	Nominated
2003	Destiny's Child	Favorite Pop Act - International	Nominated
2006	Destiny's Child	Outstanding Achievement in Popular Music	Won

=== MTV Europe Music Awards ===
Year	Nominated work	Category	Result
2000	Destiny's Child	Best R&B Artist	Nominated
2001	Destiny's Child	Best R&B Artist	Nominated
2001	Destiny's Child	Best Group	Nominated
2001	"Survivor"	Best Song	Nominated

=== MTV Video Music Awards ===
Year	Nominated work	Category	Result	Ref.
2000	"Say My Name"	Best Group Video	Nominated	
2000	"Say My Name"	Best Pop Video	Nominated	
2000	"Say My Name"	Best R&B Video	Won	
2001	"Survivor"	Best Group Video	Nominated	
2001	"Survivor"	Best Pop Video	Nominated	
2001	"Survivor"	Best R&B Video	Won	
2001	"Independent Women Part I"	Best Video from a Film	Nominated	
2001	"Independent Women Part I"	Viewer's Choice	Nominated	
2005	"Soldier"	Best Group Video	Nominated	
2005	"Lose My Breath"	Best Dance Video	Nominated	

=== MTV Japan Video Music Awards ===
Year	Nominated work	Category	Result	Ref.
2002	"Independent Women Part 1"	Best Video from a Film	Nominated	
2005	"Lose My Breath"	Video of the Year	Nominated	
2005	"Lose My Breath"	Best Group Video	Nominated	
2006	"Stand Up for Love"	Best R&B Video	Nominated	
2006	Destiny's Child	Inspiration Award	Won	

=== MTV TRL Award ===
Year	Nominated work	Category	Result	Ref.
2005	Destiny's Child	Walk This Way / Best Entrance	Won	

== NAACP Image Awards ==
Year	Nominated work	Category	Result
2000	Destiny's Child	Outstanding Duo or Group	Won
2001	Destiny's Child	Outstanding Duo or Group	Won
2002	Destiny's Child	Outstanding Duo or Group	Won
2005	Destiny's Child	Outstanding Duo or Group	Won
2006	Destiny's Child	Outstanding Duo or Group	Won

== Nickelodeon Australian Kids' Choice Awards ==
Year	Nominated work	Category	Result
2005	Destiny's Child	Favorite Music Group	Won

== Nickelodeon Kids' Choice Awards ==
Year	Nominated work	Category	Result
2000	"Bug a Boo"	Favorite Song	Nominated
2001	Destiny's Child	Favorite Singing Group	Won
2002	Destiny's Child	Favorite Singing Group	Won
2003	Destiny's Child	Favorite Singing Group	Nominated
2005	"Lose My Breath"	Favorite Song	Nominated
2005	Destiny's Child	Favorite Singing Group	Nominated
2006	Destiny's Child	Favorite Singing Group	Nominated

== NRJ Awards ==
Year	Nominated work	Category	Result
2001	Destiny's Child	Best International Duo/Group	Won

== NRJ Radio Awards ==
Year	Nominated work	Category	Result
2001	"Independent Women Part I"	Best Soundtrack Song	Won

== People's Choice Awards ==
Year	Nominated work	Category	Result
2006	Destiny's Child	Favorite Musical Group	Nominated

== Radio Disney Music Awards ==
Year	Nominated work	Category	Result
2003	Destiny's Child	Best Group	Won

== Radio Music Awards ==
Year	Nominated work	Category	Result	Ref.
2000	Destiny's Child	Artist of the Year - Hip-Hop Rhythmic Radio	Nominated	
2001	Destiny's Child	Artist of the Year - Hip-Hop Rhythmic Radio	Won	
2001	Destiny's Child	Artist of the Year - Top 40 Pop Radio	Won	

== RTHK International Pop Poll ==
Year	Nominated work	Category	Result
2002	"Survivor"	10 International Gold Songs	Won
2005	"Lose My Breath"	10 International Gold Songs	Won

== Rock the Vote Award ==
Year	Nominated work	Category	Result
2002	Destiny's Child	Patrick Lippert Award	Won

== Smash Hits Poll Winners Party ==
Year	Nominated work	Category	Result
2001	Destiny's Child	Best R&B Act	Won

== Soul Train ==
=== Soul Train Music Awards ===
Year	Nominated work	Category	Result	Ref.
1998	"No, No, No"	Best R&B/Soul Single by a Group, Band or Duo	Nominated	
2000	"Bills, Bills, Bills"	Best R&B/Soul Single by a Group, Band or Duo	Nominated	
2000	The Writing's on the Wall	Best R&B/Soul Album by a Group, Band or Duo	Nominated	
2001	Destiny's Child	Entertainer of the Year	Won	
2001	"Independent Women Part I"	Best R&B/Soul Single by a Group, Band or Duo	Nominated	
2002	"Survivor"	Best R&B/Soul Single by a Group, Band or Duo	Nominated	
2002	Survivor	Best R&B/Soul Album by a Group, Band or Duo	Nominated	
2005	"Lose My Breath"	Best R&B/Soul Single by a Group, Band or Duo	Nominated	
2005	Destiny Fulfilled	Best R&B/Soul Album by a Group, Band or Duo	Won	
2006	Destiny's Child	Career Achievement	Won	
2006	"Cater 2 U"	Best R&B/Soul Single by a Group, Band or Duo	Won	

=== Soul Train Lady of Soul Awards ===
Year	Nominated work	Category	Result	Ref.
1998	Destiny's Child	Best R&B/Soul or Rap New Artist	Won	
1998	"No, No, No"	Best R&B/Soul Single by a Group, Band or Duo	Won	
1998	Destiny's Child	Best R&B/Soul Album by a Group, Band or Duo	Won	
2000	The Writing's on the Wall	Best R&B/Soul Album	Won	
2000	"Say My Name"	Best R&B/Soul Single by a Group, Band or Duo	Won	
2001	"Survivor"	Best R&B/Soul Single by a Group, Band or Duo	Won	
2002	"Emotion"	Best R&B/Soul Single by a Group, Band or Duo	Won	
2002	Survivor	Best R&B/Soul Album by a Group, Band or Duo	Won	
2005	"Soldier" (feat. T.I. and Lil Wayne)	Best R&B/Soul Single by a Group, Band or Duo	Won	
2005	Destiny Fulfilled	Best R&B/Soul Album by a Group, Band or Duo	Won	

== Teen Choice Awards ==
Year	Nominated work	Category	Result
2000	Destiny's Child	Choice Music: Pop Group	Nominated
2000	"Say My Name"	Choice Music: Single	Nominated
2000	"Say My Name"	Choice Music: R&B/Hip-Hop Track	Nominated
2001	Destiny's Child	Choice Music: Pop Group	Won
2001	Destiny's Child	Choice Music: Concert	Nominated
2001	"Bootylicious"	Choice Music: Dance Track	Nominated
2001	"Bootylicious"	Choice Music: Summer Song	Nominated
2001	"Survivor"	Choice Music: Single	Nominated
2001	Survivor	Choice Music: Album	Nominated
2005	"Soldier" (feat. T.I. and Lil Wayne)	Choice Music: R&B/Hip-Hop Track	Nominated

== Telecom Mobile Music Awards ==
The Telecom Mobile Music Awards New Zealand were presented to international and local record labels for the top 20 songs that Telecom mobile users had downloaded, as either a ringtone or caller tune, starting in 2005.

Year	Nominated work	Category	Result	Ref.
2005	"Lose My Breath"	Gold Award	Won	
2005	"Soldier" (feat. T.I. and Lil Wayne)	Gold Award	Won	

== TMF Awards ==
=== TMF Belgium Awards ===
Year	Nominated work	Category	Result
2000	Destiny's Child	Best R&B/Rap Artist - International	Won
2001	Destiny's Child	Best R&B/Rap Artist - International	Won
2001	Survivor	Best Album - International	Won

=== TMF Netherlands Awards ===
Year	Nominated work	Category	Result
2000	Destiny's Child	Best R&B - International	Won
2001	Destiny's Child	Best R&B - International	Won
2001	"Independent Women Part I"	Best Single - International	Won
2002	Survivor	Best Album - International	Won
2002	Destiny's Child	Best R&B - International	Won
2005	Destiny's Child	Best Pop Group - International	Won

== Top of the Pops Awards ==
Year	Nominated work	Category	Result
2001	Destiny's Child	Top R'n'B Award	Won

== VH1 ==
=== My VH1 Music Awards ===
Year	Nominated work	Category	Result
2001	What's Going On (with Artists Against AIDS Worldwide)	There's no "I" in Team	Won

=== VH1/Vogue Fashion Awards ===
Year	Nominated work	Category	Result
2000	"Say My Name"	Most Stylish Video	Nominated
2001	Destiny's Child	Most Stylish Group	Won

== Vibe of the Year Awards ==
Year	Nominated work	Category	Result
2001	Destiny's Child	Best Group	Won

== World Music Awards ==
Year	Nominated work	Category	Result
2002	Destiny's Child	World's Best-Selling Artist or Group	Won
2002	Destiny's Child	World's Best-Selling Pop Group	Won
2002	Destiny's Child	World's Best-Selling R&B Group	Won
2005	Destiny's Child	World's Best Selling Female Group of All Time	Won
2005	Destiny's Child	World's Best-Selling Pop Group	Won
2005	Destiny's Child	World's Best-Selling R&B Group	Won

== Young Hollywood Hall of Fame ==
The Young Hollywood Hall of Fame is a history of the greatest all-time young entertainers of each era from 1908 to the present. The Hall of Fame pays tribute to the biggest young stars in motion pictures, television, music and radio. Each year the top young stars between an average age range of 5–21 years old are inducted into the Hall of Fame.

Year	Nominated work	Category	Result
2002	Destiny's Child	Inductee	Won

== See also ==
- List of awards and nominations received by Beyoncé
- List of awards and nominations received by Kelly Rowland
- List of awards and nominations received by Michelle Williams
