= Everybody Dance Now season 1 =

Everybody Dance Now
- Season 1
- Hosted by: Sarah Murdoch
- Judges: Jason Derülo; Kelly Rowland

Release
- Original network: Network Ten
- Original release: 12 August – 19 August 2012

Everybody Dance Now is an Australian television dance competition that aired on Network Ten. The first season premiered on 12 August 2012. The show was hosted by Sarah Murdoch, while Jason Derülo and Kelly Rowland served as dance masters. On 21 August 2012, Network Ten cancelled Everybody Dance Now due to poor ratings.

== Format ==
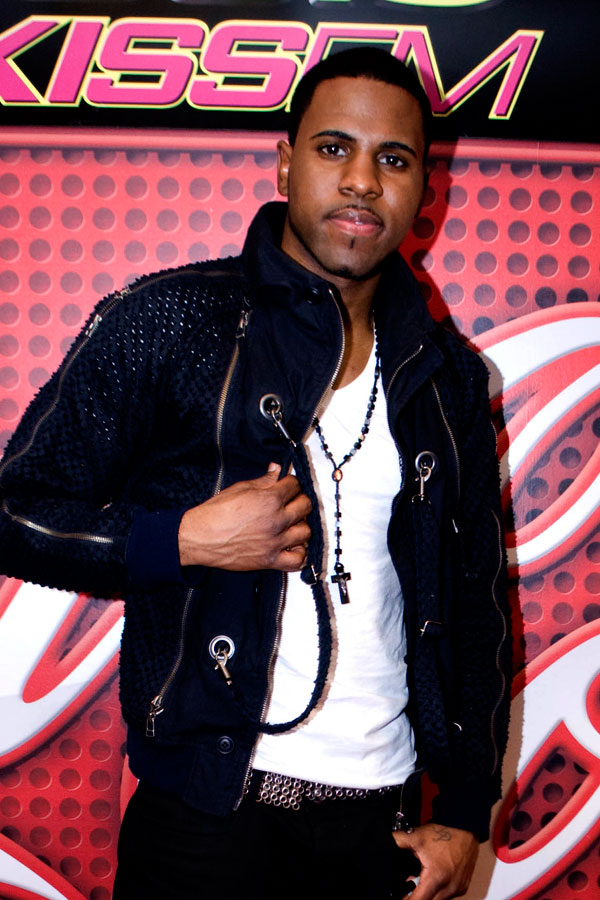
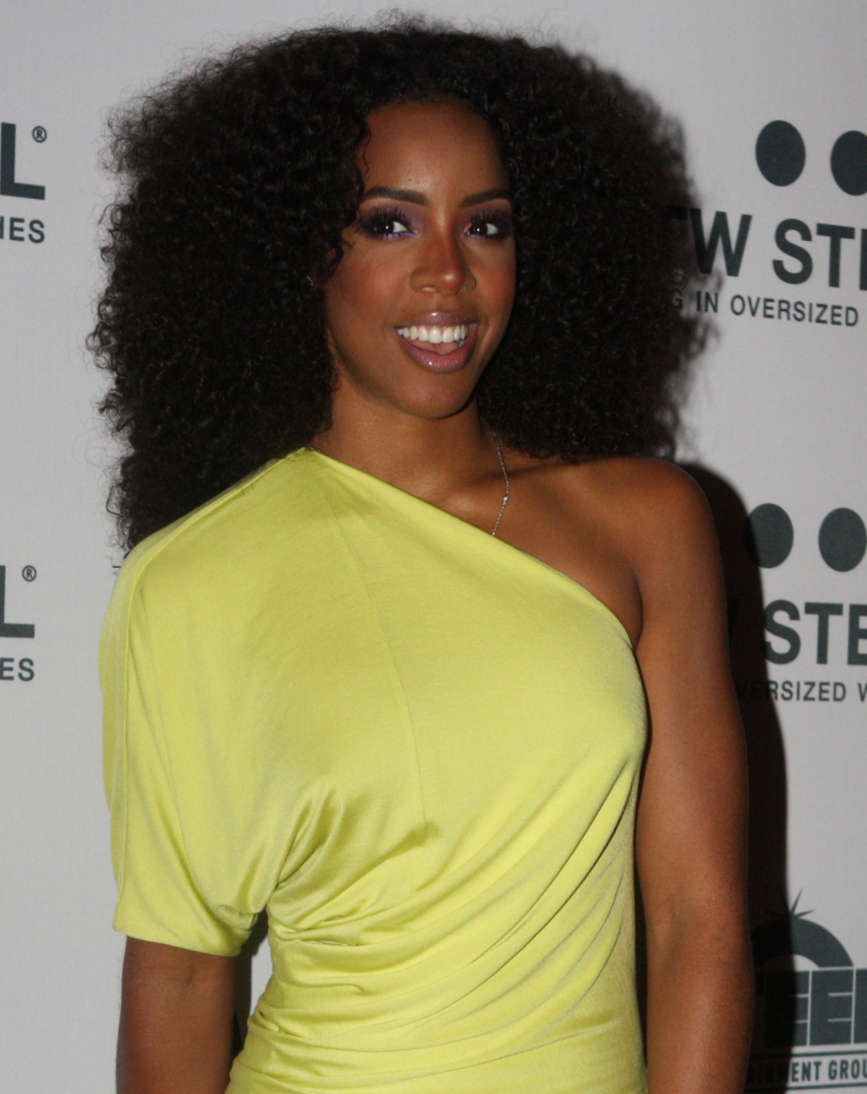
Jason Derülo (left) and Kelly Rowland (right) were the dance masters for the first season of Everybody Dance Now.

Everybody Dance Now was open to solo acts, duos and groups of any age, style or size. They were divided into two teams, with each being led by the dance masters Jason Derülo and Kelly Rowland, who challenged, trained and mentored their acts. Each team had a dance captain; Team Kelly had Marco Pantic and Team Jason had Amy Campbell. The teams would face a studio audience in each episode "to do battle in a colosseum-style dance duel". During the heats stage of the competition, eight acts would perform during each episode in four duels. Once each of the duels are complete, the studio audience would vote for the act they think should progress through to the dance duel decider round. During this round, the studio audience would vote again for the two acts they think should win $10,000 and progress through to the finals. During the finals, dance acts would compete for the ultimate prize of $250,000.

== Auditions ==
Audition city	Date	Audition venue
Brisbane	2–3 June 2012	Brisbane Convention and Exhibition Centre
Adelaide	8 June 2012	Ridley Centre, Adelaide Showgrounds
Perth	10 June 2012	Perth Convention and Exhibition Centre
Melbourne	16–17 June 2012	Melbourne Exhibition Centre
Sydney	23–24 June 2012	Badgery Pavilion, Sydney Showgrounds

== Heats ==
=== Episode 1 (12 August 2012) ===
Key
– Team Jason
– Team Kelly

Duels
Order	Dance Acts		Winning Acts
1	Tannos + Choice	Swagamama	Tannos + Choice
2	Prolifique	Boylesque	Boylesque
3	Nobel Lakaev	Paradizo	Nobel Lakaev
4	Julz & Annalisa	Dave Coombs	Dave Coombs
Dance Duel Decider
Order	Winning Acts		Through to Finals
1	Dave Coombs	Boylesque	Boylesque
2	Nobel Lakaev	Tannos + Choice	Tannos + Choice

Notes

- Jason Derülo performed a medley of his songs "It Girl", "Pick Up the Pieces" and "Breathing".

=== Episode 2 (13 August 2012) ===
Key
– Team Jason
– Team Kelly

Duels
Order	Dance Acts		Winning Acts
1	Saea Banyana	Bianca Mackail	Saea Banyana
2	Mamas Boyz	Reece and Kieran	Reece and Kieran
3	Singh Sabha Bhangra	Salt Entertainment	Singh Sabha Bhangra
4	Rick Stix	Liam and Tamika	Liam and Tamika
Dance Duel Decider
Order	Winning Acts		Through to Finals
1	Saea Banyana	Singh Sabha Bhangra	Saea Banyana
2	Reece and Kieran	Liam and Tamika	Liam and Tamika

=== Episode 3 (14 August 2012) ===
Key
– Team Jason
– Team Kelly

Duels
Order	Dance Acts		Winning Acts
1	Machismo	Silizium	Machismo
2	Emily Seymour	Attitude	Attitude
3	Drumstick	Acro Yoga	Drumstick
4	Beat The Streets	Jin Wu Koon	Beat The Streets
Dance Duel Decider
Order	Winning Acts		Through to Finals
1	Drumstick	Attitude	Drumstick
2	Machismo	Beat The Streets	Beat The Streets

=== Episode 4 (19 August 2012) ===
Key
– Team Jason
– Team Kelly

Duels
Order	Dance Acts		Winning Acts
1	Michael Flores	Deja Crew	Michael Flores
2	Lucid	Steven and Giselle	Steven and Giselle
3	Flexation	The Dying Art Society	The Dying Art Society

Dance Duel Decider
Order	Winning Acts			Through to Finals
1	Michael Flores	Steven and Giselle	The Dying Art Society	The Dying Art Society

== Ratings ==
The premiere episode of Everybody Dance Now, which aired simultaneously during the Nine Network's coverage of the 2012 Summer Olympics, was watched by 598,000 viewers. The second episode was watched by 304,000 viewers, lower than How to Train Your Dragon which aired on the Seven Network's digital channel 7mate. David Knox of TV Tonight noted that the ratings were also lower than the numbers pulled by The Voice (U.S.) and Excess Baggage on the Nine Network's digital channel Go!. On 14 August 2012, Network Ten's Chief Sales Officer Barry O'Brien told advertising publication B&T that he was disappointed with the show's ratings, saying "we think the format deserved better. Clearly we are coming out of the washout and the distraction of the Olympics." O'Brien also said that the future of Everybody Dance Now "hasn't been decided yet". The third episode ratings picked up slightly from the previous episode with 324,000 viewers. The fourth episode was watched by 385,000 viewers.

#	Episode	Original airdate	Timeslot	Viewers
1	"Heats 1"	12 August 2012	Sunday 7:30 pm–9:30 pm	598,000
2	"Heats 2"	13 August 2012	Monday 8:00 pm–9:30 pm	304,000
3	"Heats 3"	14 August 2012	Tuesday 8:00 pm–9:30 pm	324,000
4	"Heats 4"	19 August 2012	Sunday 8:00 pm–9:00 pm	385,000
