= Everywhere You Go (World Cup song) =

Promotional single by Kelly Rowland featuring Rhythm of Africa United
- Released: 22 April 2010
- Genre: Reggaeton, reggae fusion
- Length: 4:07
- Label: AS Entertainment
- Songwriter: Stacy Barthe
- Producers: Steve Morales, Beni Okwenje

Music video
- "Everywhere You Go" on YouTube

"Everywhere You Go" is the MTN theme song for the 2010 FIFA World Cup performed by an all-star supergroup of international artists called Rhythm of Africa United. The song is led by US-American singer Kelly Rowland and features many male African artists and Rola Saad, a Lebanese female singer.

American producer Steve Morales produced and American songwriter Stacy Barthe wrote the song. Both have been collaborating on a Heidi Montag album before.

The song was confirmed by Antos Stella of "AS Entertainment" in a press release published on April 1, 2010: Kelly Rowland is a hot international artist with crossover appeal spanning all communities, and we were ecstatic when she jumped at the opportunity to be part of this powerful anthem. With the arrival of Africa's first FIFA World Cup it was important that we attracted the cream of the continent's musical talent as well as a world-famous headline act to collaborate on this song.

"Everywhere You Go" made its premiere on radio stations across Africa on April 12, 2010 and will be available to purchase at the end of May 2010. A portion of all proceeds will go to "United Against Malaria" & "1Goal" initiatives.

== Performers ==
- Kelly Rowland United States
- 2face Nigeria
- Awadi Senegal
- Chameleone Uganda
- Jozi South Africa
- Krotal Cameroon
- Rola Lebanon
- Samini Ghana
- Slikour & Kwesta South Africa
- Zuluboy South Africa

== Production ==
The idea was conceived by Antos Stella of AS Entertainment: "I'd always wanted to do a song featuring Africa's top artists," she said. "I'd covered the whole of Africa and realised hip hop is happening on this continent. But I wanted to do a track with artists who use traditional African elements in hip hop."

Enter MTN, which was looking for an official song for their World Cup campaign. This resulted in big-time producer Steve Morales getting involved and when Kelly heard the track she was sold! "I got word through my management team and when I heard it, I knew it would be great to be involved.This song is about coming together and doing something new and cool. There is no song quite like this."

== Remixes ==
Ugandan rapper Jose Chameleone provided additional vocals to a remixed version, produced by Ugandan producer Beni Okwenje a.k.a. "Global". The remix production is on a number of the other country versions.

== Live performance ==
All artists except for Kelly Rowland (who was touring in Australia at that time (Supafest)) premiered the song live at the 16th annual South African Music Awards in Sun City, South Africa on 17 April 2010. The show was televised live on SABC1.

Four days later the second live performance took place in the town of Newtown, South Africa during an exclusive "invite only" concert for a crowd which included business people and celebrities. This performance featured all artists including Kelly Rowland, who came to South Africa for a promotional visit. The song was also performed at the closing ceremony of the FIFA World Cup 2010 without Rowland's presence, due to her commitments in the United States.

== Music video ==
Kelly Rowland, Jozi and Samini shot their parts for the musicvideo on 21 April 2010 in Johannesburg in front of a green screen. The video was directed by Andrew Wessels and designed and animated by Nicework. According to Antos Stella the concept of the video is as follows: "We want to reflect what is happening in urban Africa. I am hoping that this video will be relevant in five years' time. It's not just part of the World Cup. Our audience is the MTV market, first in Africa and then in the rest of Europe." The artists were dressed by Baby Phat and Phat Farm South Africa. The video premiered on June 13 on the Pan-African music channel Channel O as well as during the first 2010 FIFA World Cup game on South African national television.

== Release history ==
Country	Date	Format	Label
Botswana	April 22, 2010	Digital download	MTN Group
Congo	April 22, 2010	Digital download	MTN Group
Ghana	April 22, 2010	Digital download	MTN Group
Ivory Coast	April 22, 2010	Digital download	MTN Group
Liberia	April 22, 2010	Digital download	MTN Group
Nigeria	April 22, 2010	Digital download	MTN Group
Rwanda	April 22, 2010	Digital download	MTN Group
South Africa	April 22, 2010	Digital download	MTN Group
Swaziland	April 22, 2010	Digital download	MTN Group
Uganda	April 22, 2010	Digital download	MTN Group
Yemen	April 22, 2010	Digital download	MTN Group
Zambia	April 22, 2010	Digital download	MTN Group

== Credits ==
- Writers: Stacy Barthe
- Producer: Steve Morales
- Sound Engineer: Sebastian Krys
- Mastering: Brian Gardner
