= List of awards and nominations received by Kelly Rowland =

Kelly Rowland awards and nominations
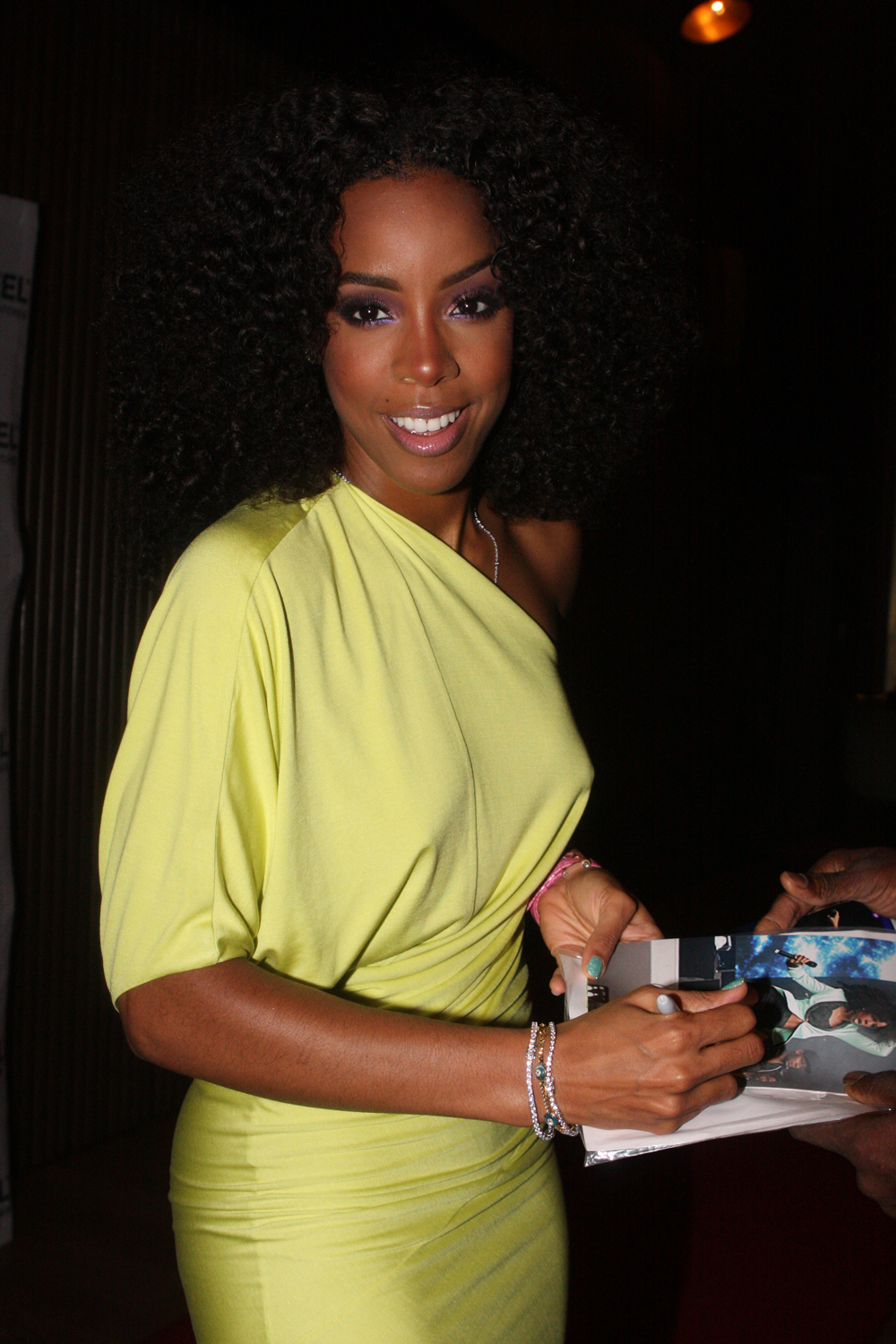
- Rowland in 2012
Awards and nominations
Award	Wins	Nominations
American Music Awards	0	1
Billboard	1	1
Grammy	4	21
World Music	0	7

Totals (Note: Certain award groups do not simply award one winner. They acknowledge several different recipients, have runners-up, and have third place. Since this is a specific recognition and is different from losing an award, runner-up mentions are considered wins in this award tally. For simplification and to avoid errors, each award in this list has been presumed to have had a prior nomination.)
- Wins: 27
- Nominations: 71

Kelly Rowland is an American singer who began her career with the R&B girl group Destiny's Child, one of the world's best-selling girl groups of all time. During the group's hiatus, Rowland released her debut solo album Simply Deep in 2002, which included the worldwide number-one single "Dilemma" with American rapper Nelly, and "Stole". which reached the top 10 in several countries. The album was a commercial success; it was certified gold by the Recording Industry Association of America (RIAA), and sold more than 2.5 million copies worldwide. Following the disbandment of Destiny's Child in 2005, Rowland released her second solo album Ms. Kelly in 2007, which spawned the singles "Like This" and "Work". In 2009, Rowland scored her second worldwide number-one hit with French DJ David Guetta, on his single "When Love Takes Over". Her third album Here I Am was released in 2011. It spawned the international top-ten singles "Commander" and "Down for Whatever", as well as the US R&B/Hip-Hop number-one "Motivation".

In 2003, Rowland received eight nominations and won five for the single "Dilemma", including Hot Rap Track of the Year at the Billboard R&B/Hip-Hop Awards, Favorite International Single at the Capital FM Awards, Record of the Year and Best Rap/Sung Collaboration at the 45th Grammy Awards, and Best R&B Video at the MTV Video Music Awards, among others. The success of "When Love Takes Over" garnered Rowland more nominations throughout 2009 and 2010, winning two for Best Pop Dance Track at the International Dance Music Awards, and Best International DeeJay Favorite at the Danish DeeJay Awards. In 2011, she received six nominations and won two for Song of the Year for "Motivation" at the Soul Train Music Awards, and Ultimate TV Personality at the Cosmopolitan Ultimate Women of the Year Awards, for her role as a judge and mentor on The X Factor UK. Rowland has won four Grammy Awards, including three as a Destiny's Child member and one as a solo artist. Overall, she has won 25 awards from 72 nominations.

== Awards and nominations ==
Award	Year	Category	Work	Result	Ref.
American Music Awards	2011	Favorite Soul/R&B Female Artist	—	Nominated	
amfAR Gala Los Angeles	2022	Award of Courage	—	Won	
ASCAP Pop Music Awards	2006	Most Performed Songs	"Lose My Breath"	Won	
ASCAP Pop Music Awards	2006	Most Performed Songs	"Soldier"	Won	
ASCAP Pop Music Awards	2007	Most Performed Songs	"Grillz"	Won	
ASCAP Rhythm & Soul Music Awards	2006	Award Winning R&B/Hip-Hop Songs	"Cater 2 U"	Won	
ASCAP Rhythm & Soul Music Awards	2006	Award Winning R&B/Hip-Hop Songs	"Soldier"	Won	
ASCAP Rhythm & Soul Music Awards	2007	Award Winning R&B/Hip-Hop Songs	"Grillz"	Won	
ASCAP Women Behind the Music Awards	2010	Outstanding Women in the Music Industry	—	Won	
BDSCertified Spin Awards	2002	50,000 Spins Award	"Stole"	Won	
BDSCertified Spin Awards	2002	50,000 Spins Award	"Dilemma"	Won	
BDSCertified Spin Awards	2002	200,000 Spins Award	"Dilemma"	Won	
BDSCertified Spin Awards	2003	300,000 Spins Award	"Dilemma"	Won	
BDSCertified Spin Awards	2003	400,000 Spins Award	"Dilemma"	Won	
BDSCertified Spin Awards	2006	100,000 Spins Award	"Here We Go"	Won	
BDSCertified Spin Awards	2007	500,000 Spins Award	"Dilemma"	Won	
BDSCertified Spin Awards	2011	100,000 Spins Award	"Motivation"	Won	
BDSCertified Spin Awards	2011	200,000 Spins Award	"Motivation"	Won	
BET Awards	2003	Best Collaboration	"Dilemma"	Nominated	
Billboard Music Awards	2002	Top Hot 100 Song	"Dilemma"	Nominated	
Billboard Music Awards	2002	Top Rap Song	"Dilemma"	Nominated	
Billboard Music Awards	2012	Top R&B Song	"Motivation"	Won	
Billboard R&B/Hip-Hop Awards	2003	Hot Rap Track of the Year	"Dilemma"	Nominated	
Capital FM Award	2003	Favorite International Single	"Dilemma"	Won	
Cosmopolitan Awards	2011	Ultimate TV Personality	—	Won	
Danish DeeJay Awards	2010	Best International Club-Hit	"When Love Takes Over"	Won	
Danish DeeJay Awards	2010	Best International DeeJay Favorite	"When Love Takes Over"	Won	
Glamour Awards	2012	Top TV Personality	—	Won	
Grammy Awards	2000	Best R&B Performance by a Duo or Group with Vocals	"Bills, Bills, Bills"	Nominated	
Grammy Awards	2000	Best R&B Song	"Bills, Bills, Bills"	Nominated	
Grammy Awards	2001	Record of the Year	"Say My Name"	Nominated	
Grammy Awards	2001	Song of the Year	"Say My Name"	Nominated	
Grammy Awards	2001	Best R&B Song	"Say My Name"	Won	
Grammy Awards	2001	Best R&B Performance by a Duo or Group with Vocals	"Say My Name"	Won	
Grammy Awards	2002	Best R&B Performance by a Duo or Group with Vocals	"Survivor"	Won	
Grammy Awards	2002	Best R&B Album	Survivor	Nominated	
Grammy Awards	2003	Record of the Year	"Dilemma"	Nominated	
Grammy Awards	2003	Best Rap/Sung Collaboration	"Dilemma"	Won	
Grammy Awards	2005	Best R&B Performance by a Duo or Group with Vocals	"Lose My Breath"	Nominated	
Grammy Awards	2006	Best R&B Performance by a Duo or Group with Vocals	"Cater 2 U"	Nominated	
Grammy Awards	2006	Best R&B Song	"Cater 2 U"	Nominated	
Grammy Awards	2006	Best Contemporary R&B Album	Destiny Fulfilled	Nominated	
Grammy Awards	2006	Best Rap/Sung Collaboration	"Soldier"	Nominated	
Grammy Awards	2010	Best Dance Recording Non-Classical	"When Love Takes Over"I	Nominated	
Grammy Awards	2012	Best Rap/Sung Collaboration	"Motivation"	Nominated	
International Dance Music Awards	2010	Best Pop Dance Track	"When Love Takes Over"	Nominated	
International Dance Music Awards	2010	Best House/Garage Track	"When Love Takes Over"	Nominated	
International Dance Music Awards	2010	Best Music Video	"When Love Takes Over"	Nominated	
International Dance Music Awards	2011	Best R&B/Urban Dance Track	"Commander"	Nominated	
MOBO Awards	2003	Best R&B Act	—	Nominated	
MOBO Awards	2003	Best Single	"Dilemma"	Nominated	
MTV Europe Music Awards	2009	Best Song	"When Love Takes Over"	Nominated	
MTV Video Music Awards	2003	Best R&B Video	"Dilemma"	Nominated	
MTV Video Music Awards	2014	Best Video with a Message	"Dirty Laundry"	Nominated	
MTV Video Music Awards Japan	2003	Best Collaboration	"Dilemma"	Nominated	
MTV Video Music Awards Japan	2010	Best Dance Video	"When Love Takes Over"	Nominated	
NAACP Image Awards	2003	Outstanding New Artist	—	Nominated	
NAACP Image Awards	2020	Outstanding Guest Actor or Actress in a Television Series	American Soul	Won	
Nickelodeon Kids' Choice Awards	2003	Favorite Song	"Dilemma"	Nominated	
Soul Train Music Awards	1998	Best R&B/Soul Single by a Group, Band or Duo	"No, No, No"	Nominated	
Soul Train Music Awards	2000	Best R&B/Soul Single by a Group, Band or Duo	"Bills, Bills, Bills"	Nominated	
Soul Train Music Awards	2000	Best R&B/Soul Album by a Group, Band or Duo	The Writing's on the Wall	Nominated	
Soul Train Music Awards	2001	Entertainer of the Year	Destiny's Child	Won	
Soul Train Music Awards	2001	Best R&B/Soul Single by a Group, Band or Duo	"Independent Women Part I"	Nominated	
Soul Train Music Awards	2002	Best R&B/Soul Single by a Group, Band or Duo	"Survivor"	Nominated	
Soul Train Music Awards	2002	Best R&B/Soul Album by a Group, Band or Duo	Survivor	Nominated	
Soul Train Music Awards	2003	Best R&B/Soul or Rap Music Video	"Dilemma"	Nominated	
Soul Train Music Awards	2005	Best R&B/Soul Album – Group, Band or Duo	Destiny Fulfilled	Won	
Soul Train Music Awards	2005	Best R&B/Soul Single – Group, Band or Duo	"Lose My Breath"	Nominated	
Soul Train Music Awards	2006	Best R&B/Soul Single – Group, Band or Duo	"Cater 2 U"	Won	
Soul Train Music Awards	2006	Quincy Jones Award for Outstanding Career Achievements – Female	Destiny's Child	Honored	
Soul Train Music Awards	2011	Best Song of the Year	"Motivation"	Won	
Soul Train Music Awards	2011	Best Dance Performance	"Motivation"	Nominated	
Soul Train Music Awards	2011	Best R&B/Soul Female Artist	—	Nominated	
Soul Train Music Awards	2013	Best R&B/Soul Female Artist	—	Nominated	
Soul Train Music Awards	2014	Best Gospel/Inspirational Song	"Say Yes"	Nominated	
Soul Train Music Awards	2014	Best Independent R&B/Soul Performance	"Love & Sex, Pt. 2"	Won	
Soul Train Music Awards	2019	Soul Train Certified Award	—	Nominated	
Soul Train Music Awards	2020	Soul Train Certified Award	—	Nominated	
Stellar Awards	2015	Song of the Year	"Say Yes"	Nominated	
Stellar Awards	2015	Music Video of the Year	"Say Yes"	Won	
Stellar Awards	2015	Urban/Inspirational Single or Performance of the Year	"Say Yes"	Nominated	
Teen Choice Awards	2003	Choice Music - Hook Up	"Dilemma"	Nominated	
Teen Choice Awards	2003	Choice R&B/Hip-Hop Artist	—	Nominated	
World Music Awards	2010	Best Single	"When Love Takes Over"	Nominated	
