= Kelly Rowland =

American singer, songwriter and actress (born 1981)

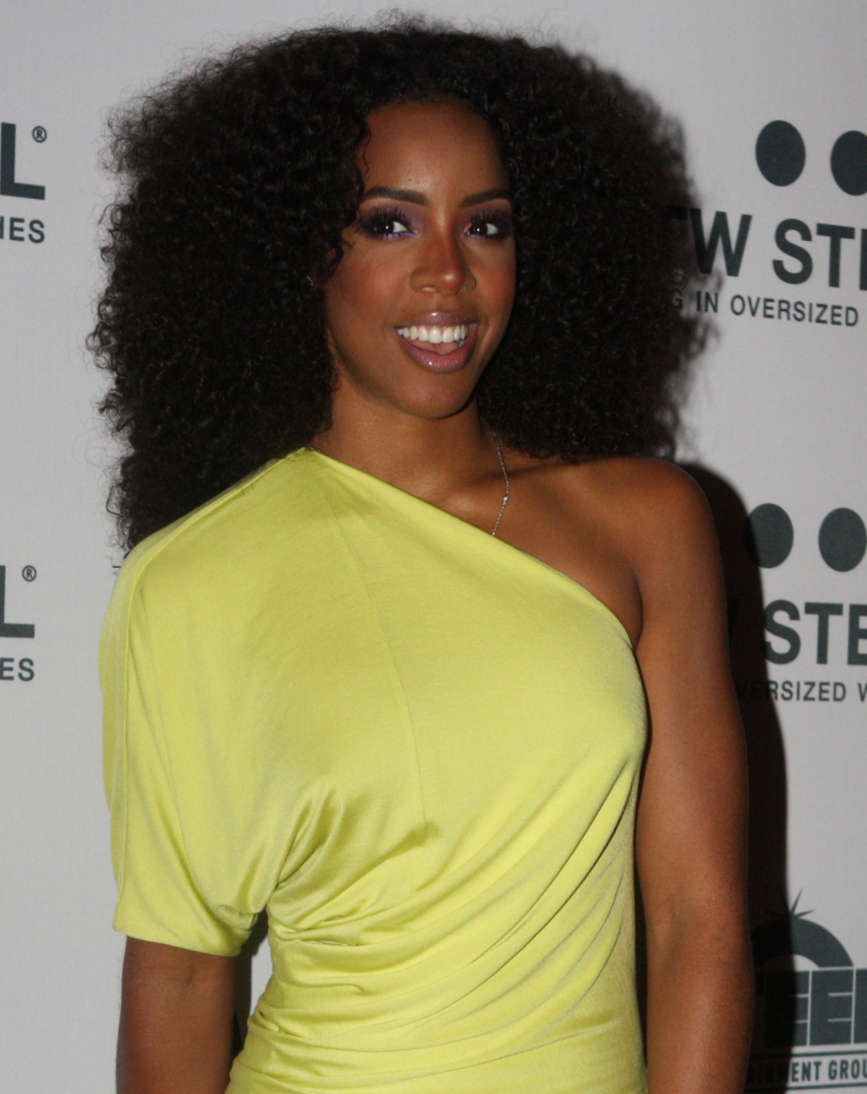
- Rowland in 2012
- Born: Kelendria Trene Rowland; February 11, 1981 (age 45); Atlanta, Georgia, U.S.
- Occupations: Singer; songwriter; actress; television personality
- Years active: 1992–present
- Works: Solo discography (Note: For her works with Destiny's Child, see Destiny's Child discography and List of Destiny's Child songs); songs; videography; performances
- Television: The X Factor UK; The X Factor USA; The Voice Australia; The Voice UK
- Spouse: Tim Weatherspoon (m. 2014)
- Children: 2
- Awards: Full list
- Musical career
- Origin: Houston, Texas, U.S.
- Genres: R&B; pop; hip-hop; dance; rock; soul
- Instrument: Vocals
- Labels: Roc Nation; KTR; Ingrooves; Universal; Island; Republic; Universal Motown; Music World; Columbia
- Formerly of: Destiny's Child
- Website: kellyrowland.com

Kelendria Trene "Kelly" Rowland (born February 11, 1981) is an American singer, songwriter, actress, and television personality. She rose to fame in the late 1990s as a member of Destiny's Child, one of the world's best-selling girl groups. During the group's three-year hiatus, Rowland released her debut solo album, Simply Deep (2002), which appeared at number 1 on the UK Albums Chart and sold over five million copies worldwide. It included the Billboard Hot 100 number 1 single "Dilemma" (with Nelly), as well as the UK hits "Stole" and "Can't Nobody". Rowland also ventured into acting with starring roles in Freddy vs. Jason (2003) and The Seat Filler (2005).

Following the disbanding of Destiny's Child in 2006, Rowland released her second solo album, Ms. Kelly (2007), which produced the international hits "Like This" (featuring Eve) and "Work". In 2009, she hosted the first season of The Fashion Show, and was featured on David Guetta's "When Love Takes Over", which topped the charts in several countries. Its success influenced Rowland to explore electronic dance music on her third solo album, Here I Am (2011), which spawned the UK hit singles "Commander" (featuring David Guetta), "Down for Whatever" and "What a Feeling", as a well as the electro-R&B single "Motivation" (featuring Lil Wayne).

Her fourth solo album, Talk a Good Game (2013), became her third Top 10 album on the US Billboard 200 chart. Rowland was a television judge on the eighth season of The X Factor UK (2011), as well as the third season of The X Factor USA (2013). She has continued her television career by hosting Chasing Destiny (2016) and starring as a coach on The Voice Australia (2017–2020) and The Voice UK (2026-present). Rowland is credited with forming the girl groups Little Mix and June's Diary from her stints on The X Factor UK and Chasing Destiny.

Rowland's work has earned her several awards and nominations, including four Grammy Awards, one Billboard Music Award, and two Soul Train Music Awards. Rowland has also received a star on the Hollywood Walk of Fame as part of Destiny's Child, and as a solo artist, she has been honored by the American Society of Composers, Authors and Publishers and Essence for her contributions to music. In 2014, Fuse ranked Rowland in their "100 Most Award-Winning Artists" list at number 20.

== Early life ==
Kelendria Trene Rowland was born in Atlanta, Georgia, on February 11, 1981. She is the daughter of Doris Rowland-Garrison (December 6, 1947 – December 2, 2014) and Christopher Lovett. She has an older brother named Orlando. When Rowland was seven, her mother left her father, who was an abusive alcoholic and suffered post-traumatic stress disorder (PTSD) from serving in the Vietnam War, and Rowland went with her. When Rowland was seven or eight, she and her mother relocated to Houston, where at some point she moved in with fellow Destiny's Child member Beyoncé, referring to Beyoncé's mother Tina Knowles as "Mama T".

In the early 1990s, Rowland joined Beyoncé, Tamar Davis and LaTavia Roberson in the girl group Girl's Tyme. Girl's Tyme competed on the nationally televised talent show Star Search, but lost the competition to Skeleton Crew. Beyoncé's father, Mathew Knowles, reduced the sextet lineup to a quartet, including new member LeToya Luckett, and began managing the group. In 1995, they signed with Elektra Records, but were released from the label months later. D'wayne Wiggins then began working with the group, and they were briefly signed to his label. The group went through several name changes, including the Dolls, Something Fresh, Cliché, and Destiny before deciding upon a final moniker. Under the name Destiny's Child, the group was picked up by Columbia Records. They continued performing as an opening act for other established R&B groups of the time, such as SWV, Dru Hill, and Immature.

== Career ==
=== 1997–2001: Destiny's Child ===
Taken from a passage in the Biblical Book of Isaiah, the group changed their name to Destiny's Child, after signing to Columbia Records in 1997. That same year, Destiny's Child recorded their major label debut song "Killing Time", for the soundtrack to the 1997 film Men in Black. Later that year, the group released their debut single, "No, No, No", and the following year, they released their self-titled debut album. The album amassed moderate sales and won the group three Soul Train Lady of Soul Awards. The group released their multi-platinum second album The Writing's on the Wall in 1999. The album features some of the group's most successful singles such as "Bills, Bills, Bills", "Jumpin' Jumpin'" and "Say My Name". "Say My Name" won Best R&B Performance by a Duo or Group with Vocals and Best R&B Song at the 43rd Annual Grammy Awards. The Writing's on the Wall sold more than 15 million copies worldwide.

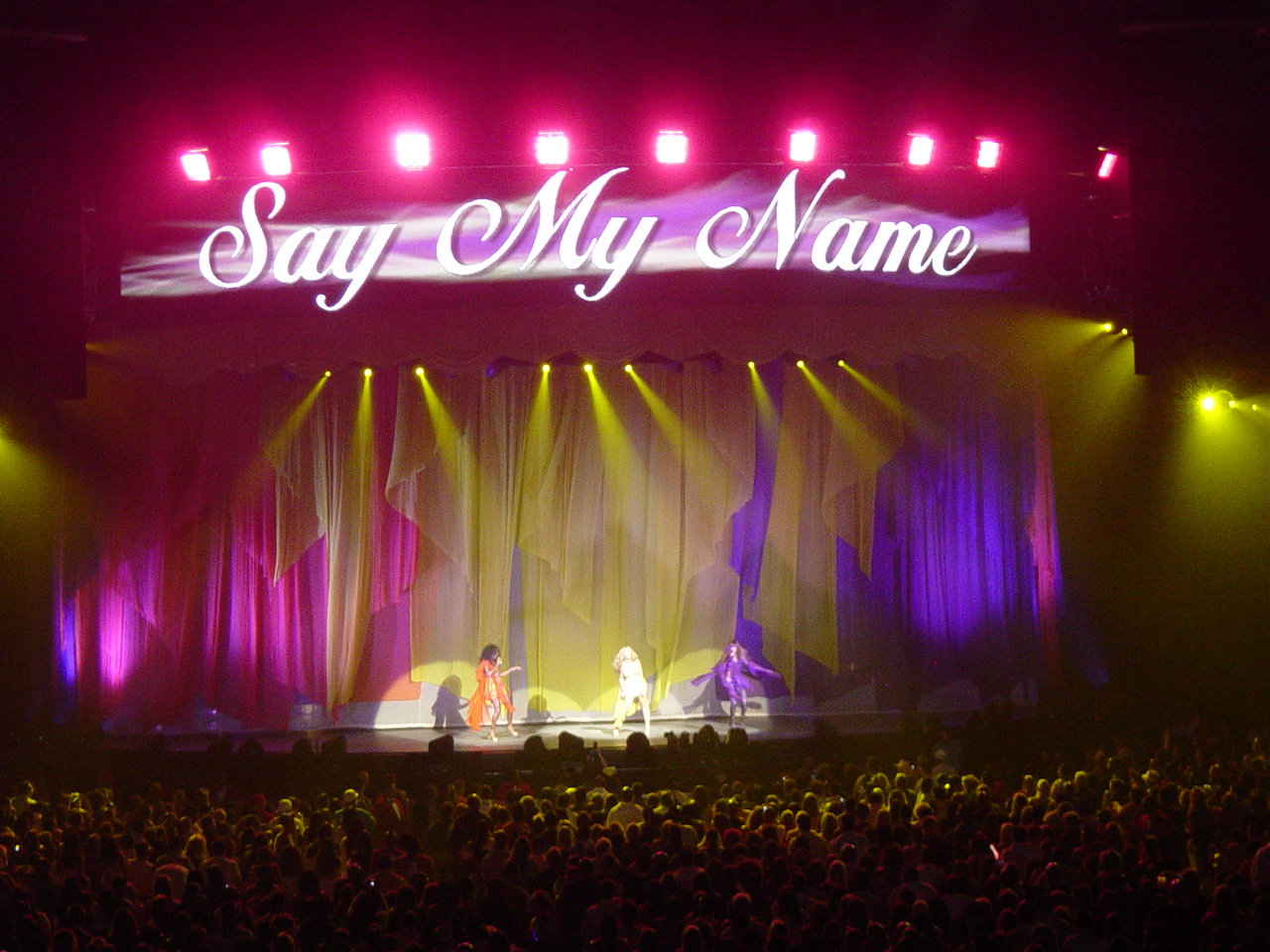
Destiny's Child performing their 2000 hit "Say My Name" during their farewell concert tour, Destiny Fulfilled ... And Lovin' It

Along with their commercial successes, the group became entangled in much-publicized turmoil involving the filing of a lawsuit by group members Luckett and Roberson for breach of contract. Michelle Williams and Farrah Franklin appeared in the video of "Say My Name", and Luckett and Roberson were dismissed from the group. Franklin would eventually quit the group after five months. After settling on their final lineup, the trio released "Independent Women Part I", which appeared on the soundtrack to the 2000 film, Charlie's Angels. It became their best-charting single, topping the Billboard Hot 100 for eleven consecutive weeks. That same year, Luckett and Roberson withdrew their case against their now-former bandmates, while maintaining the suit against Mathew, which ended in both sides agreeing to stop public disparaging.

Later that year, while Destiny's Child was completing their third album Survivor, Rowland appeared on the remix of Avant's single "Separated". Survivor, which channeled the turmoil the band underwent, spawned its lead single of the same name, which was a response to the experience. The song went on to win a Grammy Award for Best R&B Performance by a Duo or Group with Vocals. The themes of "Survivor", however, caused Luckett and Roberson to refile their lawsuit; the proceedings were eventually settled in June 2002. The album was released in May 2001, debuting at number one on the US Billboard 200 with first-week sales of 663,000 copies sold. Survivor has sold over twelve million copies worldwide, over forty percent of which were sold in the US alone. The album also spawned the number-one hit "Bootylicious" on which Rowland sang lead vocals. Before releasing their remix album This Is the Remix in 2002, the group announced a temporary hiatus to pursue solo projects.

=== 2002–2006: Simply Deep and Destiny Fulfilled ===
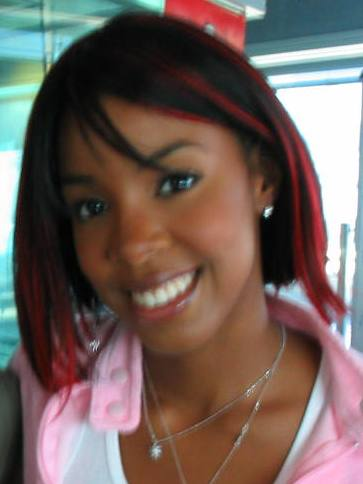
Rowland in May 2003

In 2002, Rowland was featured on Nelly's single "Dilemma", which won the pair a Grammy Award for Best Rap/Sung Collaboration. The song became one of the most successful singles of the year, topping many charts worldwide, including the United States, where it became Rowland's first number-one single as a solo artist, selling worldwide over 7.6 million copies. Caroline Sullivan of The Guardian wrote that because of the song's success, "Rowland is no longer a mere backing vocalist for Beyoncé.".

Rowland's debut solo album, Simply Deep, was released on October 22, 2002, in the US. Featuring production contributions by Mark J. Feist, Big Bert, Rich Harrison, and singers Brandy and Solange Knowles providing background vocals, the album took Rowland's solo work further into an alternative music mixture, which Rowland described as a "weird fusion [of] a little bit of Sade and a little bit of rock." Simply Deep debuted at number 12 on the Billboard 200 and at number three on the R&B/Hip-Hop Albums chart, with first-week sales of 77,000 copies sold. It was eventually certified gold by the Recording Industry Association of America (RIAA). As of 2013, Simply Deep remains as Rowland's best-selling album in the US, with 602,000 copies sold. Released to an even bigger success in international territories, Simply Deep topped the UK Albums Chart and became a gold-seller in Australia, Canada, and New Zealand, resulting in worldwide sales total of 2.5 million copies. Simply Deep yielded the international top-ten single "Stole" and the UK top-five single "Can't Nobody". Rowland transitioned into acting in 2002, playing the recurring role of Carly in the fourth season of UPN sitcom The Hughleys. She continued her acting career the following year, with guest roles in UPN sitcom Eve as Cleo, and in NBC drama series American Dreams as Martha Reeves. In August 2003, Rowland made her big-screen debut playing the supporting role of Kia Waterson alongside Robert Englund and Monica Keena in the slasher film, Freddy vs. Jason, which grossed $114.5 million at the box office worldwide.

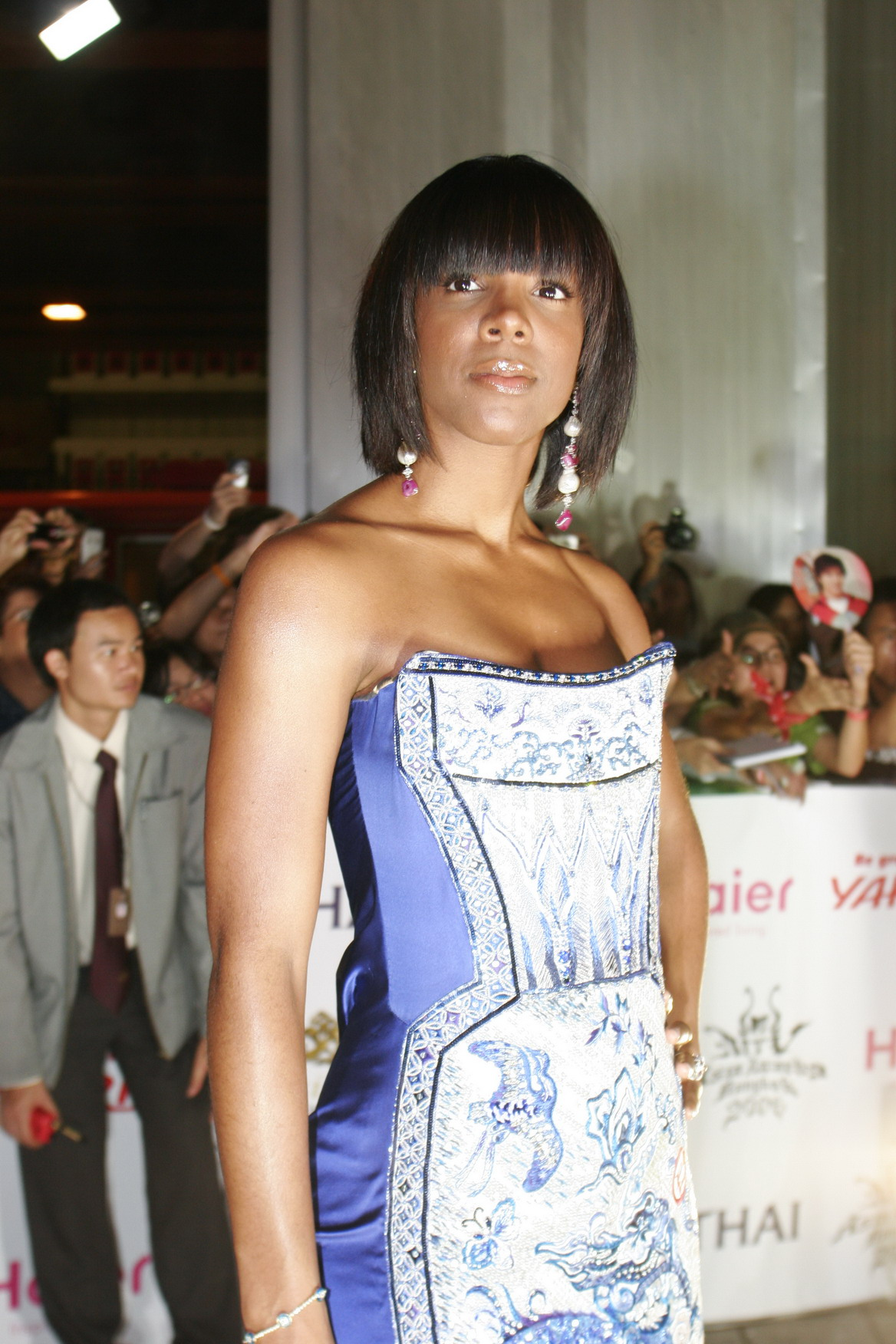
Kelly Rowland on the red carpet at MTV Asia Awards 2006 in Bangkok, Thailand.

In July 2005, Rowland starred opposite Duane Martin and Shemar Moore in the romantic comedy The Seat Filler, which grossed $17.9 million worldwide. She played Jhnelle, a pop star who falls for an awards-show seat filler whom she mistakes for a high-profile entertainment attorney. After a three-year hiatus that involved concentration on individual solo projects, Rowland rejoined Beyoncé and Michelle Williams for Destiny's Child's final studio album Destiny Fulfilled, released on November 15, 2004. The album hit number two on the Billboard 200 and spawned the top-five singles "Lose My Breath" and "Soldier", which features T.I. and Lil Wayne. The following year, Destiny's Child embarked on a worldwide concert tour, Destiny Fulfilled ... And Lovin' It. During the last stop of the European tour in Barcelona, Spain, on June 11, Rowland announced that they would disband following the North American leg of the tour. Destiny's Child released their first compilation album Number 1's on October 25 in the US, which peaked at number one on the Billboard 200. On March 28, 2006, Destiny's Child accepted a star on the Hollywood Walk of Fame.

After Hurricane Katrina in 2005, Rowland and Beyoncé founded the Survivor Foundation, a charitable entity set up to provide transitional housing for victims and storm evacuees in the Houston, Texas area. The Survivor Foundation extended the philanthropic mission of the Knowles-Rowland Center for Youth, a multi-purpose community outreach facility in downtown Houston. Rowland and Beyoncé lent their voices to a collaboration with Kitten Sera, titled "All That I'm Lookin for". The song appeared on The Katrina CD album, whose proceeds went to the Recording Artists for Hope organization. Rowland, along with stars such as Jessica Simpson and the cast of Grey's Anatomy autographed pink Goody Ouchless brushes that were made available for auction on eBay, with all proceeds going to Breast Cancer Awareness. Also, during this time, the singer teamed up with Kanye West, Nelly Furtado, and Snoop Dogg to design a Nike sneaker for another eBay auction. All proceeds went to AIDS Awareness. Rowland returned to television in 2006, playing Tammy Hamilton, in the sixth season of UPN sitcom Girlfriends. Rowland initially hoped her three-episode stint would expand to a larger recurring role, but as the show was moved to The CW Television Network the following year, plans for a return eventually went nowhere.

=== 2007–2009: Ms. Kelly ===
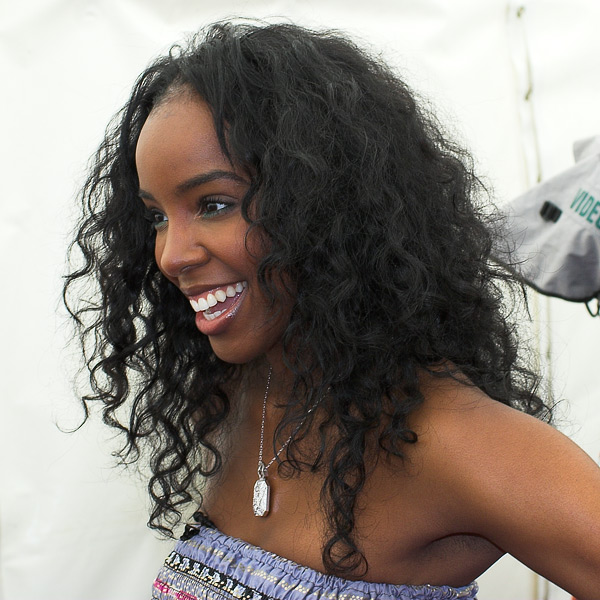
Rowland in 2008

In June 2007, Rowland embarked on the Ms. Kelly Tour to promote her second solo album Ms. Kelly. The five-date tour visited Europe, North America, Africa, and Asia. Ms. Kelly was released in the United States on July 3, 2007. Originally titled My Story, the album's first version was actually scheduled for a June 2006 release, but Rowland, her management and Columbia Records decided to shelve the album at the last minute to re-work a version with a different vibe as the singer considered the final track listing "too full of midtempos and ballads." Rowland eventually consulted additional producers to collaborate on the album, including Billy Mann, Mysto & Pizzi, Sean Garrett, Scott Storch, and Polow da Don. Upon its release, Ms. Kelly debuted at number six on the Billboard 200 and number two on the R&B/Hip-Hop Albums chart, with first-week sales of 86,000 copies. Outside the US, the album widely failed to reprise the success of Simply Deep, barely reaching the top-forty on the majority of all charts it appeared on, except for the UK, where it opened at number 37.

Ms. Kelly included the UK top-five hit "Like This", featuring Eve, as well as the international top-ten hit "Work". In July 2007, Rowland released her first DVD titled BET Presents Kelly Rowland, which celebrates the release Ms. Kelly and features an interview with Rowland about the album's production, footage of her time with Destiny's Child, live performances and music videos. Following the album's lukewarm sales, it was re-released as an extended play (EP) titled, Ms. Kelly: Diva Deluxe, on March 25, 2008. The previously unreleased Bobby Womack cover "Daylight", a collaboration with Travie McCoy, served as the EP's lead single and was a moderate success in the UK.

In October 2007, Rowland auditioned for the role of Louise, Carrie Bradshaw's assistant, in the 2008 film adaptation of HBO's comedy series Sex and the City. The part eventually went to Jennifer Hudson. Two months later, Rowland appeared as a choirmaster in the first season of the NBC talent show Clash of the Choirs among other musicians such as Michael Bolton, Patti LaBelle, Nick Lachey, and Blake Shelton. Rowland's choir finished fifth in the competition, and Clash of the Choirs did not return for a second season.

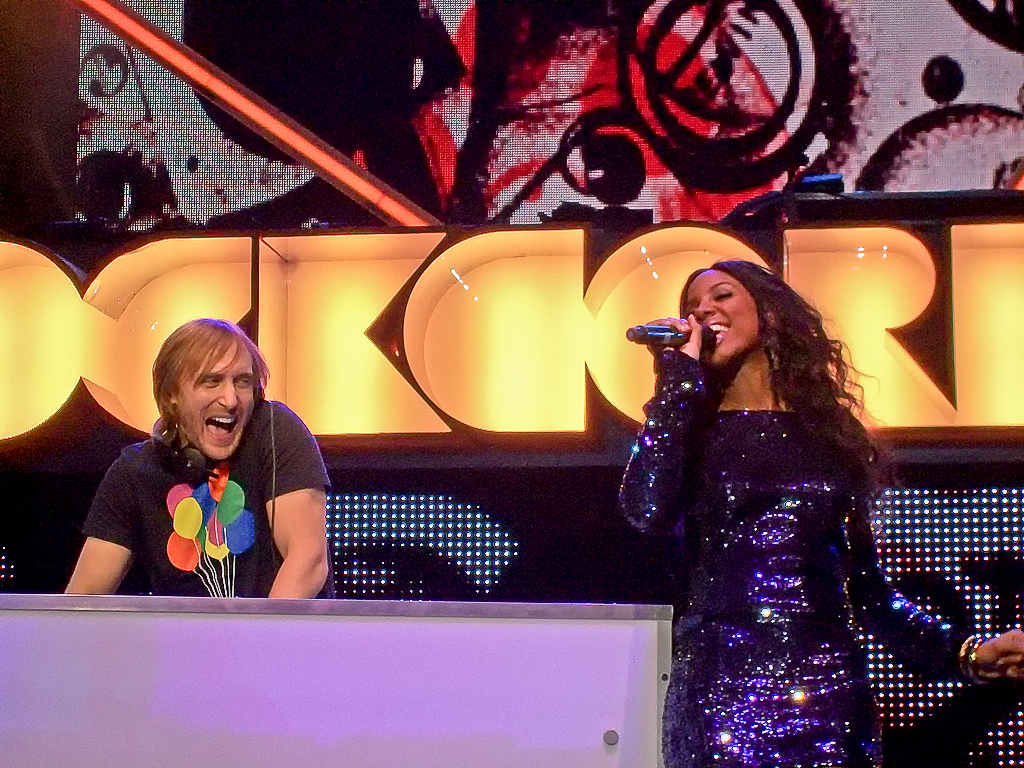
David Guetta and Rowland performing at the Orange Rockcorps in London in 2009.

In 2008, Rowland officially became an ambassador for MTV's Staying Alive Foundation, which aims to reduce stigma against people living with HIV and AIDS. She visited projects in Tanzania and Kenya to promote the charity and underwent an HIV test in Africa to raise awareness of the disease. In 2009, Rowland connected with Serve.MTV.com, MTV's platform to connect young people with local volunteerism opportunities, for a series of on-air PSAs. From battling homelessness to beautifying impoverished neighborhoods to saving whales, Rowland was joined by the likes of Cameron Diaz, will.i.am, and Sean Kingston as they discuss causes they volunteer to support and urge young people to join with their friends in making civic service a part of their lifestyle. That same year, she spearheaded a bone marrow drive, and joined fellow singers Alesha Dixon and Pixie Lott to create T-shirts for River Island in aid of the Prince's Trust, profits from which help change young lives.

In January 2009, Rowland ended her professional relationship with Beyoncé's father, Mathew Knowles, who had managed her career since she was a member of Destiny's Child. Knowles stressed that no animosity was involved in the decision and acknowledged that Rowland will always be a part of the Knowles family. Then two months later, Rowland announced that she left Columbia Records, adding that she "felt the need to explore new directions, new challenges, and new freedoms outside my comfort zone." In an interview with Entertainment Weekly, Rowland stated that the label ended her contract because Ms. Kelly was not commercially successful. She later signed with Universal Motown Records.

In April 2009, Rowland was featured on David Guetta's single "When Love Takes Over", which topped many charts in Europe, selling over 5,5 million copies worldwide, and received a Grammy Award nomination for Best Dance Recording. Billboard crowned the song as the number one dance-pop collaboration of all time. In May 2009, Rowland was cast to host the first season of Bravo's reality competition series The Fashion Show alongside Isaac Mizrahi, but was replaced by fashion model Iman in the second season.

=== 2010–2012: Here I Am and The X Factor UK ===
Rowland launched I Heart My Girlfriends, a charity that focuses on self-esteem, date violence prevention, community service, abstinence, sports, drug/alcohol/smoking avoidance, obesity, disabilities, and education, in 2010. She toured Australia alongside Akon, Pitbull, Sean Paul, Jay Sean, and Eve for the Australian urban festival, Supafest, in April of the same year. Later that month, her song "Everywhere You Go", featuring an all-star supergroup of international artists called Rhythm of Africa United, was released as the MTN theme song for the 2010 FIFA World Cup in South Africa. In October 2010, the American Society of Composers, Authors and Publishers (ASCAP) honored Rowland at the second annual ASCAP Presents Women Behind the Music, an event that recognizes women in all areas of the music industry. Rowland's first compilation album, Work: The Best of Kelly Rowland, was released on October 25, 2010, but failed to impact the charts.

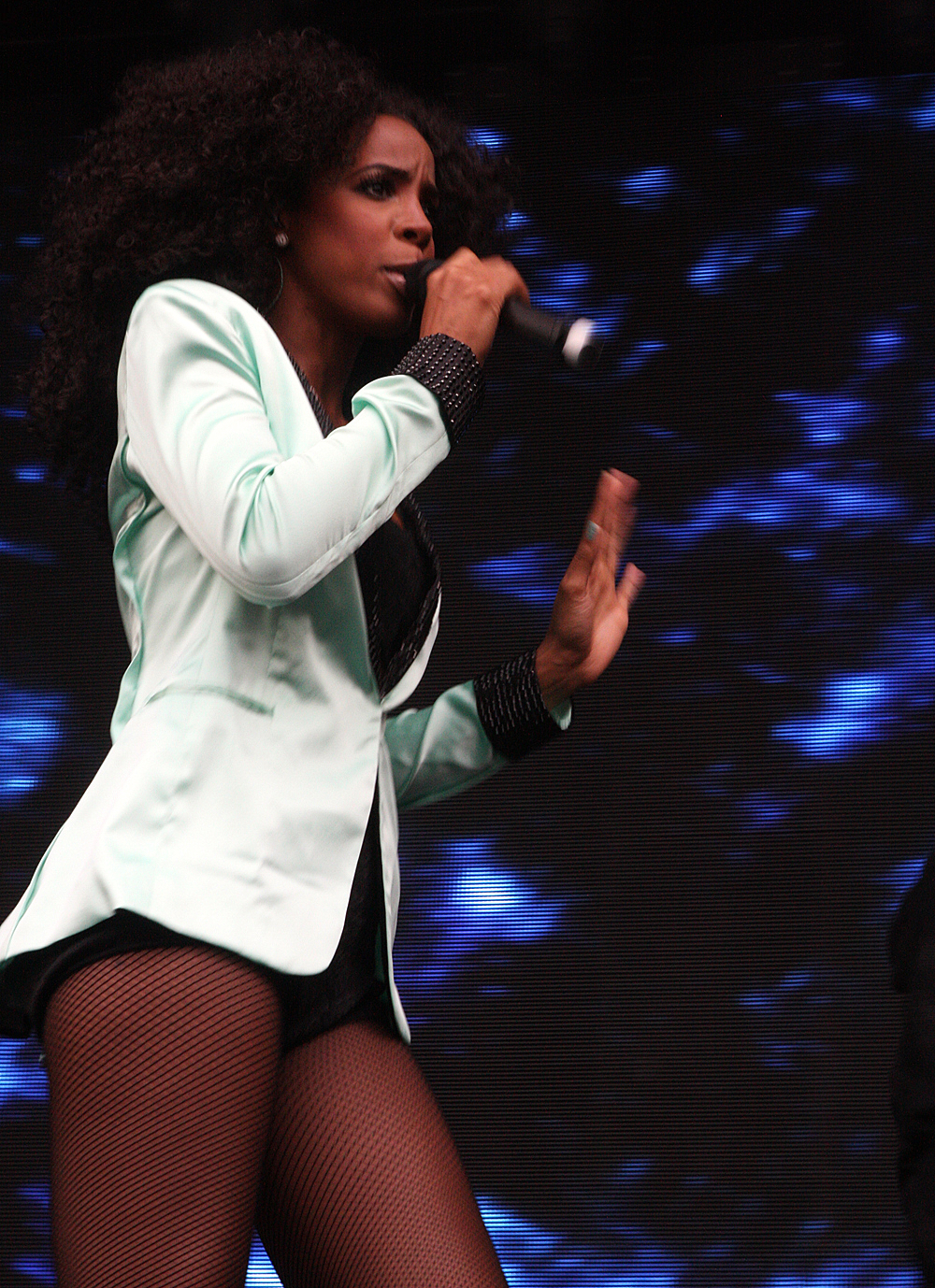
Rowland performing in Sydney during Supafest, April 2012

In January 2011, Rowland reunited with Nelly on "Gone", a sequel to their successful 2002 collaboration "Dilemma". Upon its release, the song failed to reprise the success of "Dilemma". In April 2011, Rowland appeared on Italian DJ Alex Gaudino's single "What a Feeling", which became another UK top-ten hit. During this time, Rowland's boyfriend (and future husband), Tim Weatherspoon, became her manager. Originally scheduled for release in 2010, Rowland's third studio album Here I Am was released on July 26, 2011, in the United States. The album sold 77,000 copies in its first week and debuted atop the R&B/Hip-Hop Albums chart. Here I Am produced the successful lead single "Commander", which peaked in the top-ten of many charts in Europe, and the UK top-ten single "Down for Whatever". It also included another successful single "Motivation", with Lil Wayne, which topped the R&B/Hip-Hop Songs chart for seven consecutive weeks and was certified double platinum by the Recording Industry Association of America (RIAA). "Motivation" won Song of the Year at the 2011 Soul Train Music Awards and Top R&B Song at the 2012 Billboard Music Awards, and received a Grammy Award nomination for Best Rap/Sung Collaboration. Rowland was the face of Diddy's women's fragrance Empress, the female counterpart to his men's fragrance I Am King. She was also the worldwide ambassador for watchmakers company TW Steel. Rowland's second compilation album, Playlist: the Very Best of Kelly Rowland, was released on October 18, 2011, but failed to impact the charts. She also released her first fitness DVD titled Sexy Abs with Kelly Rowland. Later that year, it was confirmed that Rowland would replace Dannii Minogue as a judge for the eighth series of The X Factor UK alongside Louis Walsh, Gary Barlow (who replaced Simon Cowell), and Tulisa (who replaced Cheryl Cole). Rowland's team of contestants in the "Girls" category, including Amelia Lily, becoming the last contestant eliminated in one series. Rowland would also later be revealed as the judge who formed the girl group Little Mix. Due to a conflicting schedule, Rowland did not return for the ninth series in 2012 and was replaced by former judge of The X Factor USA, Nicole Scherzinger. During the Black Women in Music event held on February 8, 2012, Essence magazine honored Rowland and music executive Sylvia Rhone for their contributions to music. In April 2012, Rowland toured Australia alongside Ludacris, Chris Brown, Trey Songz, T-Pain, Ice Cube, Lupe Fiasco, and Big Sean for the urban festival, Supafest. That same month, she returned to the big screen playing the supporting role of Brenda in the romantic comedy Think Like a Man. The film, which also starred Michael Ealy, Jerry Ferrara, Meagan Good, Regina Hall, and Kevin Hart, topped the US box office and grossed $91.5 million. Rowland recorded "Need a Reason" with Future and Bei Maejor for the Think Like a Man soundtrack.

In June 2012, Rowland became the face of popular rum brand Bacardi. Rowland and German production team Project B reworked the Bacardi song, "Bacardi Feeling (Summer Dreamin')", and released an accompanying music video to help promote the brand. In August 2012, Rowland became a dance master in the first season of the Australian talent show Everybody Dance Now alongside Jason Derulo. The show was canceled after the fourth episode due to poor ratings.

=== 2013–2014: Talk a Good Game and The X Factor USA ===
In January 2013, Destiny's Child released a compilation album titled Love Songs, a collection of romance-themed songs from their previous albums, as well as the newly recorded song "Nuclear". On February 3, 2013, during Beyoncé's performance at the Super Bowl XLVII halftime show, held at the Mercedes-Benz Superdome in New Orleans, Rowland and Michelle Williams joined her on stage to perform "Bootylicious", "Independent Women" and "Single Ladies (Put a Ring on It)". On February 24, 2013, Rowland co-hosted the Academy Awards pre-show for the 85th Academy Awards alongside Kristin Chenoweth, Lara Spencer, Robin Roberts, and Jess Cagle. In May 2013, it was announced that Rowland would replace L.A. Reid as a judge on The X Factor USA for its third and final season, joining Simon Cowell, Demi Lovato, and fellow new judge Paulina Rubio (who was replacing Britney Spears). Rowland's contestants from the "Over 25s", including Jeff Gutt, finished as the runner-up on this final season. On The X Factor USA, Rowland had more success and popularity as a judge than The X Factor UK. Later that month, Rowland performed as a supporting headlining act at the RiverFest 2013 in Little Rock, Arkansas. Rowland embarked on the Lights Out Tour, a co-headlining tour with The-Dream, to promote her fourth studio album Talk a Good Game. Formerly titled Year of the Woman, the album was released on June 18, 2013, in the US. It is Rowland's first release with Republic Records following Universal Music Group's decision to close Universal Motown and Universal Republic and reviving Motown Records and Republic Records. Talk a Good Game sold 68,000 copies in its first week and debuted at number four on the Billboard 200, becoming Rowland's third top-ten album in the US. The album's lead single "Kisses Down Low" was a moderate success on the US R&B/Hip-Hop Songs chart and was certified gold by RIAA for exceeded 500,000 copies sold. The second and final single was "Dirty Laundry". In December 2013, Rowland appeared in Beyoncé's "Grown Woman" music video and alongside Williams in Beyoncé's "Superpower" music video and provided backing vocals on the same track, taken from her self-titled fifth studio album.

In February 2014, Rowland was featured on Joe's single "Love & Sex Part 2". In March 2014, she was named a spokesperson for cosmetic company Caress. During an interview with HuffPost Live on March 26, 2014, Rowland revealed that she has begun recording her fifth studio album and said the new music, which encompasses horns, drums, and flutes, was influenced by iconic female singers including Diana Ross. Rowland also announced in the interview that she left Republic Records, adding that she "just needed a fresh, new start." In June 2014, Rowland and Beyoncé were featured on Williams' single "Say Yes". The same month, her song "The Game" and its music video appeared on Pepsi's visual album for the 2014 FIFA World Cup, titled Beats of the Beautiful Game. In July 2014, Rowland was featured on Adrian Marcel's song "Honey" from his mixtape Weak After Next and on Beau Vallis's song "Love Stand Still". Rowland also contributed background vocals to the song "You're My Star", the first single released from Tank's 2014 album Stronger.

=== 2015–2020: The Voice Australia ===
In August 2015, Rowland was featured on Jacob Whitesides's single "I Know What You Did Last Summer". Rowland was also part of the recurring cast of the second season of the television series Empire. She played Leah Walker, Lucious Lyon's mother, in flashbacks and starred in five episodes. Rowland recorded a song for the show called "Mona Lisa" which was included in the EP Empire: Music from "Be True", released on October 21, 2015. On October 26, 2015, Rowland released a new song titled "Dumb" which is rumored to appear on her upcoming fifth album. Rowland's new record does not have a release date yet.

Rowland, along with Missy Elliott, Kelly Clarkson, Zendaya, Janelle Monáe, Lea Michele, and Chloe x Halle were all featured on a charity single put together by US First Lady Michelle Obama. "This Is For My Girls" was written by Diane Warren and was released on March 15, 2016. The song was created to raise funds and awareness towards Obama's Let Girls Learn initiative – aimed at boosting education rates amongst adolescent girls around the world who are denied the right to an education. The iTunes-exclusive record was used to both coincide with Obama's Texan SXSW speech and to promote the "Let Girls Learn" initiative. The following month, Rowland hosted BET's documentary series Chasing Destiny, where she and choreographer/director Frank Gatson Jr. searched to find the next superstars for an all-female group. They eventually formed the girl group June's Diary.

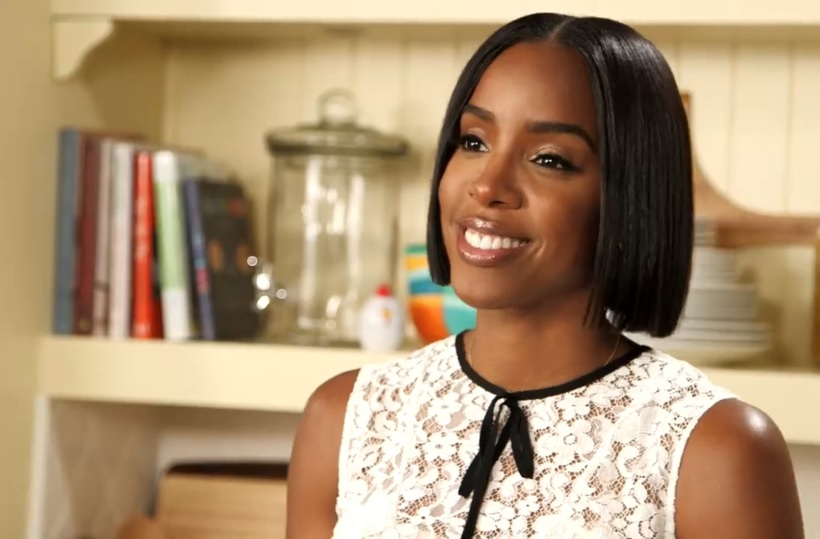
Rowland in 2018

On December 24, 2016, it was announced that Rowland would replace Ronan Keating as a coach on the sixth season of The Voice Australia, which aired in early 2017. Rowland played the role of Margot Scotts in the television film Love By the 10th Date, which premiered on Lifetime on January 28, 2017. On April 11, 2017, Rowland released her first book named Whoa, Baby!: A Guide for New Moms Who Feel Overwhelmed and Freaked Out (and Wonder What the #*$& Just Happened). On August 8, 2017, it was announced that Rowland was joining new judge Jennifer Hudson on the thirteenth season of The Voice US, who served as the winning coach on last season's The Voice UK. Hudson supported Rowland, a coach on the Australian version, as her advisor. In April 2018, Rowland reunited with Beyoncé Knowles and Michelle Williams during Knowles' headlining set at the Coachella Valley Music and Arts Festival. In the seventh season of The Voice Australia, she became the winning coach with two of her contestants Sam Perry and Bella Paige became the final two, with Sam Perry as the winner and Bella Paige as the runner-up.

In September 2018, BET announced that Rowland would star as Gladys Knight in the series American Soul. She released a new single, "Kelly" on November 22, 2018. In February 2019, American Soul premiered to positive reviews. On February 6, Rowland released a second single called "Crown" with the music video in partnership with Dove for the campaign #MyHairMyCrown. In May 2019, she featured on Ciara's song "Girl Gang" from the album Beauty Marks. On May 18, Rowland published an EP titled The Kelly Rowland Edition on streaming platforms. She also continued her work at The Voice Australia, starred in television series L.A.'s Finest, Robin Thede's HBO series A Black Lady Sketch Show, and the Christmas movie, Merry Liddle Christmas, produced by Rowland and her husband for Lifetime in December 2019. As part of the Christmas movie, Rowland released a song, "Love You More at Christmas Time" via her own record label, KTR Records. On April 17, 2020, Rowland released a single titled "Coffee" through KTR Records. On May 6, 2020, she announced her management deal with Roc Nation. This announcement meant Rowland's husband would no longer manage her. In the ninth season of The Voice Australia, she became the winning coach for the second time with her contestant Chris Sebastian as the winner.

=== 2020–present: K, The Voice UK, and other works ===
Rowland made a cameo in Beyoncé's Disney+ musical film Black Is King, which was released globally on July 31, 2020. She appeared in the movie Bad Hair, released on Hulu, in October 2020. Rowland recorded three songs for the movie's soundtrack. That same month, she released her second single of the year titled "Crazy" on KTR Records, along with an official lyric video. As part of the NFL's Songs of the Season campaign, Rowland released another single called "Hitman" in November 2020. An accompanying music video premiered on YouTube. Rowland continued acting, starring in Merry Liddle Christmas Wedding, Lifetime's first-ever holiday sequel to Merry Liddle Christmas, which aired at the end of the month. Rowland recorded a cover of "We Need a Little Christmas" to help promote the film, which she produced with her husband.

To commemorate her fortieth birthday, Rowland released the dance-infused song "Black Magic" on February 12, 2021. Her sons, Titan and Noah, make an appearance in the supporting visual. On February 19, Rowland's EP, K, premiered on streaming platforms, alongside the music video for its opening track, "Flowers". In November 2021, Rowland released a cover of "Wonderful Time" to support her third holiday movie, Merry Liddle Christmas Baby, which aired that month on Lifetime. In November 2022, Rowland starred alongside Marsai Martin and Omari Hardwick in the Paramount+ film Fantasy Football. On February 26, 2023, Rowland performed at the Domain Dance Party for WorldPride Sydney 2023. On June 3, 2023, she headlined the English Mighty Hoopla music festival, held in London, sharing the top billing with English electro band Years & Years. Rowland later starred opposite actor Trevante Rhodes in Tyler Perry's Netflix legal drama, Mea Culpa, which was released on February 23, 2024.

On June 24, 2025, it was announced Rowland would appear as a support act for Brandy and Monica's The Boy Is Mine Tour alongside Muni Long and Jamal Roberts; the tour took place from October to December 2025. In February 2026, Rowland starred alongside Method Man in the romantic comedy Relationship Goals. Rowland debuted as a coach on series 14 of The Voice UK, which premiered on August 22, 2026.

== Personal life ==
In December 2013, Rowland announced her engagement to Tim Weatherspoon during an appearance on The Queen Latifah Show. They began dating circa 2009, after first meeting and becoming friends in the early 2000s, when they were introduced by Rowland's Destiny's Child bandmate Michelle Williams. They were married in Costa Rica on May 9, 2014, and have two sons together, born in 2014 and 2021. In June 2020, Rowland revealed she had reconciled with her estranged father, Christopher Lovett.

== Artistry ==
=== Musical style ===
"Commander" (2010)
A 19-second sample of "Commander". Rowland has stated that meeting David Guetta inspired her to record dance music.

Rowland's voice is classified as a three-octave lyric mezzo-soprano, and her music includes various styles of musical genres such as contemporary R&B, pop, hip hop, soul, as well as incorporating elements of rock, and dance. Her debut solo album Simply Deep (2002) followed an adult-alternative rock sound, while her second album Ms. Kelly (2007) featured an R&B/Hip-Hop sound. In an interview with The Independent, Rowland admitted that with her first two albums, she struggled to find her sound. "I was in a stage with the first two records where I was searching, and I was like, let me try a rock-dance approach, the label [and management] wanted me to try it, and I did it ... And then after that came a more urban approach with Ms. Kelly in 2007." Her third album Here I Am (2011) consisted of a pop and R&B sound, with subtle influences of dance. Rowland stated that meeting David Guetta had influenced her to record dance music. During production of the album, Rowland stated that part of the reason for the new sound on Here I Am was wanting to do something different, saying "I knew I couldn't be afraid of this direction, and I wasn't going to let the thoughts and opinions of others make me afraid to go in this direction".

Most of the lyrical themes in Simply Deep (2002) speak of love and life experiences, particularly in the songs "Dilemma", in which Rowland expresses her endless love to her love interest, and "Stole", in which she sings about an emotional "tale of school shootings and suicides". In Ms. Kelly (2007), Rowland covers topics such as her "deeply personal relationship issues" in her songs, "Still in Love with My Ex", "Flashback", "Love", "Better Without You" and "Gotsta Go (Part I)". Alex Macpherson of The Guardian noted that the songs could be about Rowland's former relationship with American football player Roy Williams. Here I Am (2011) included common themes of womanhood, sexual intimacy, and love. Some of Rowland's other songs such as "Work", "I'm Dat Chick" and "Work It Man" have been musically compared to the work of former Destiny's Child bandmate Beyoncé.

=== Influences ===
Rowland has cited Whitney Houston and Janet Jackson as her biggest musical influences. She stated that Houston "was the woman that inspired me to sing." Rowland is also inspired by Sade Adu and says that "she has a style that's totally her own." Other inspirations include: Martin Luther King Jr.; Mariah Carey; Mary J. Blige; Naomi Campbell; and Oprah Winfrey, whom she describes as "the female version of God." Rowland has discussed how living in Miami has influenced her style, growth, and music. From a fashion perspective, Rowland credits Halle Berry, Jennifer Lopez, Beyoncé, Oprah, and her grandmother as her style icons. Rowland cited Whitney Houston, Beyoncé, and Brandy as vocal inspirations for her second solo album Ms. Kelly, "I love how different they are. I love how they take themselves to the next level". Her third solo album Here I Am was inspired by Donna Summer and Diana Ross, as well as dance producer will.i.am. Rowland's fourth solo album Talk a Good Game was also inspired by Houston, Marvin Gaye, and Stevie Wonder.

== Public image ==
Rowland stated that there was a time in her life when she struggled with being dark-skinned. In October 2007, Rowland underwent plastic surgery to receive breast implants. She stated, "I simply went from an A-cup to a B-cup" and that "the decision was 10 years in the making". In 2012, Rowland ranked at number 61 on Complex magazine's list of "The 100 Hottest Female Singers of All Time" and was recognized as one of the best-dressed women by Glamour UK. In April 2013, Rowland ranked seventh on People's Most Beautiful in the World list. On September 5, 2023, Rowland received the Fashion Icon of the Year Award at the 2023 Harlem's Fashion Row Show and Style Awards in New York City.

== Other ventures ==
=== Film and television career ===
Rowland branched out into acting with a guest stint on the sitcom The Hughleys in 2002, before appearing in other UPN shows such as Eve and Girlfriends in the years of 2003 and 2006 respectively. Having played the role of Tammy Hamilton, an ambitious 21-year-old apprentice to realtor Toni (Jill Marie Jones) in the latter sitcom, Rowland initially hoped her three-episode stint would expand to a larger recurring role, but as the show was moved to The CW network the following year plans for a return eventually went nowhere. Also, in 2003, she appeared in American Dreams as Martha Reeves of Martha & The Vandellas, singing a version of the group's single "Nowhere to Run".

In 2002, Rowland was cast for her big-screen debut in the slasher film Freddy vs. Jason, a crossover film directed by Ronny Yu. Cast as one of the female leads, she portrayed Kia Waterson, the frank best-friend of lead character Lori Campbell, played by Monica Keena. Released to generally mixed reviews from critics, Freddy vs. Jason topped the U.S. box office, gaining $36.4 million on its first weekend. Budgeted at $25 million, Freddy vs. Jason was released in theaters on August 15, 2003, and became a financial success, resulting in a worldwide box office total of $114.3 million.

The following year, Rowland returned to the big screen, this time for a lead role in the romantic comedy The Seat Filler, starring opposite Duane Martin and Shemar Moore. Executive produced by Will Smith and Jada Pinkett Smith, the film hit theaters in the summer of 2005 and debuted at number eighteen at the box office top twenty. It eventually earned a total domestic gross ticket sales of $10.2 million. In the film, for which she recorded two songs, Rowland played a pop star who falls for an awards-show seat filler in which she mistakes for a high-profile entertainment attorney. Released to a limited number of festivals only, The Seat Filler went straight to DVD in 2006.

In October 2007, Rowland auditioned for the role of Louise, Carrie Bradshaw's assistant, in the 2008 film adaptation of HBO's comedy series Sex and the City. The part eventually went to Jennifer Hudson. In fall 2007, Rowland appeared as a choirmaster on the NBC reality show Clash of the Choirs. Rowland was among superstars like Michael Bolton, Patti LaBelle, Nick Lachey, and Blake Shelton. Rowland's choir finished fifth in the competition. In 2009, she was cast to host Bravo's reality competition-series The Fashion Show alongside Isaac Mizrahi. The series premiered on May 7, 2009.

On May 30, 2011, Rowland was confirmed as a judge for the eighth series of the British television show The X Factor to replace Dannii Minogue. In addition to her judging stint, Rowland also had a supporting role in the motion picture Think Like a Man (2012), which also starred Keri Hilson, Chris Brown, and Gabrielle Union. On April 30, 2012, it was officially announced that Rowland had departed The X Factor UK, due to a conflicting schedule. She was replaced by former judge of The X Factor USA, Nicole Scherzinger. Rowland was awarded Ultimate TV Personality at the 2011 Cosmopolitan Ultimate Women of the Year Awards, and TV Personality of the Year at the 2012 Glamour Women of the Years Awards, for her role on the show. In August 2012, Rowland became a dance master alongside Jason Derülo, for the first season of the Australian dance talent show Everybody Dance Now. However, on August 21, 2012, the show was canceled due to poor ratings.

== Philanthropy ==
Rowland and the Knowles family founded the Survivor Foundation, a charitable entity set up to provide transitional housing for 2005 Hurricane Katrina victims and storm evacuees in the Houston, Texas, area. The Survivor Foundation extended the philanthropic mission of the Knowles-Rowland Center for Youth, a multi-purpose community outreach facility in downtown Houston. Also, in 2005, Rowland and Knowles lent their voices to a collaboration with Kitten K. Sera, titled "All That I'm Lookin for". The song appeared on The Katrina CD album, whose proceeds went to the Recording Artists for Hope organization.

In 2006, Rowland joined other artists such as Pink and Avril Lavigne in ads for so-called empowerment tags for the ALDO Fights AIDS campaign, which went on sale exclusively at ALDO stores and benefited the YouthAIDS initiative. In 2007, Rowland, along with stars such as Jessica Simpson and the cast of Grey's Anatomy autographed pink Goody Ouchless brushes that were made available for auction on eBay, with all proceeds going to Breast Cancer Awareness. Also, the singer teamed up with Kanye West, Nelly Furtado, and Snoop Dogg to design a Nike sneaker for another eBay auction. All proceeds went to AIDS Awareness.

In 2008, Rowland officially became an ambassador for MTV's Staying Alive Foundation, which aims to reduce discrimination against people with HIV and AIDS. She has since visited projects in Tanzania and Kenya to promote the charity, and underwent a HIV and AIDS test in Africa to raise awareness of the deadly diseases. In March 2009, she spearheaded a bone marrow drive. As reported, Rowland also is readying a new charity called I Heart My Girlfriends, which will serve as an interactive support system for teenage girls.

In 2009, Rowland connected with Serve.MTV.com, MTV's platform to connect young people with local volunteerism opportunities, for a series of on-air PSAs. From battling homelessness to beautifying impoverished neighborhoods to saving whales, Rowland was joined by the likes of Cameron Diaz, will.i.am, and Sean Kingston as they discuss causes they volunteer to support and urge young people to join with their friends in making civil service a part of their lifestyle. Also, in 2009, Rowland, along with fellow singers Alesha Dixon and Pixie Lott, created T-shirts for River Island in aid of The Prince's Trust, profits from which help change young lives. In March 2010, Rowland launched her brand new charity, I Heart My Girlfriends. According to Rowland's official website, the charity focuses on self-esteem, date violence prevention, community service, abstinence, sports, drug and alcohol and smoking avoidance, obesity, disabilities, education, and more. On April 26, 2010, she was at Grand Ballroom's "City of Hope – Spirit of Life Awards" for a charity event.

== Awards and achievements ==
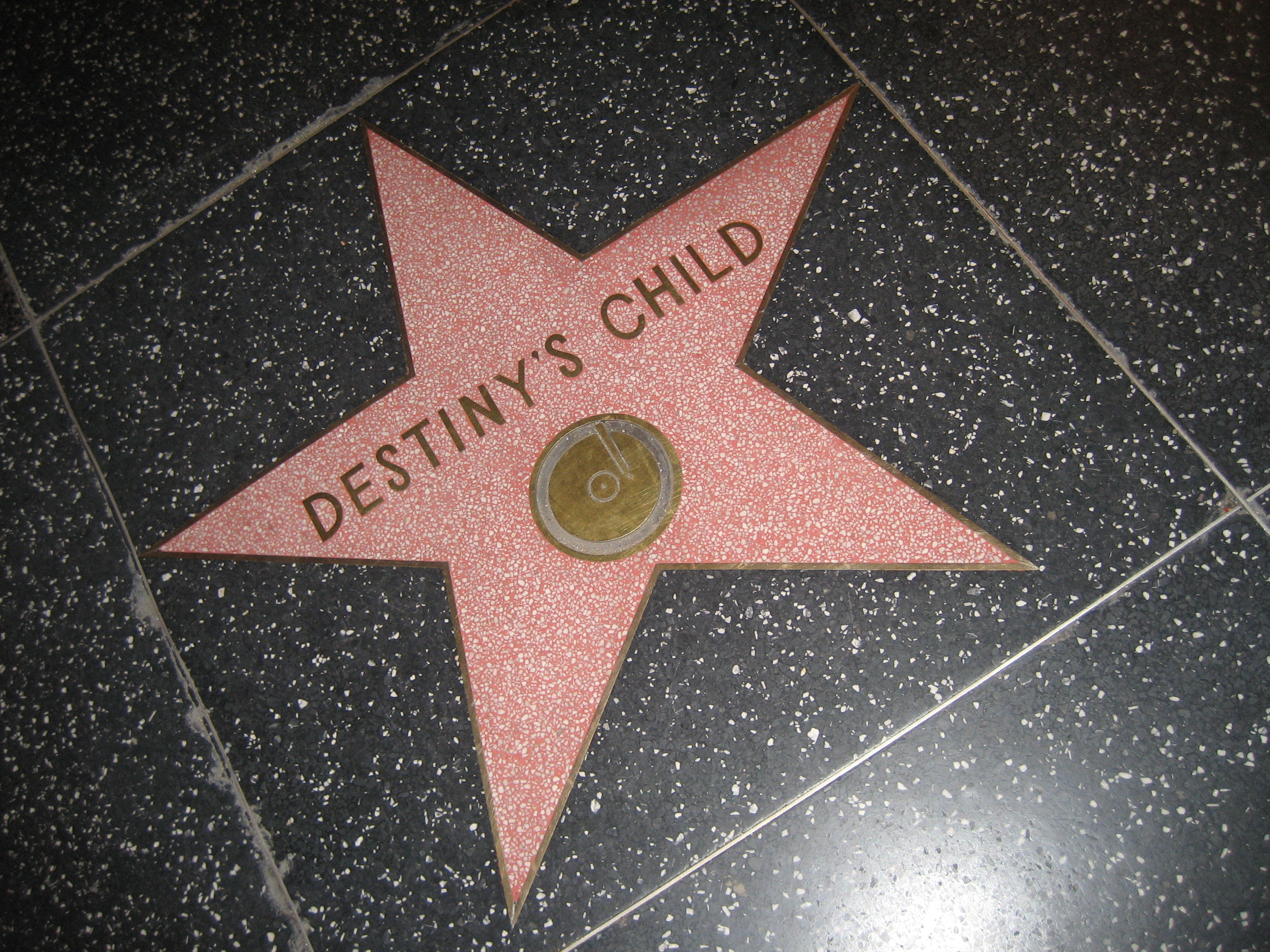
Destiny's Child star on the Hollywood Walk of Fame

As a solo artist, Rowland has attained number-one singles on several charts in the United States, including one on the Billboard Hot 100 chart, two on the Hot R&B/Hip-Hop Songs chart, and three on the Hot Dance Club Songs chart. Internationally, she has achieved nine top-ten singles in the United Kingdom, including two number-ones and one UK R&B number-one, and in Australia, she has released six top-twenty singles. With her works, she has earned over 47 international sales certifications to date. Rowland has won 19 awards from 54 nominations and a star on Hollywood Walk of Fame as a Destiny's Child member. She has won four Grammy Awards from 17 nominations and has been honored by the American Society of Composers, Authors and Publishers and Essence magazine for her contributions to music.

In 2003, Rowland received eight nominations and won five for the single "Dilemma" (a duet with American rapper Nelly) for international awards. With "Dilemma", Rowland became the first Destiny's Child member to achieve a Billboard Hot 100 and a worldwide number-one single, and to win a Grammy Award as a solo artist. "Dilemma" was ranked fifth on The 40 Biggest Duets Of All Time of Billboard, and has been a merengue version of the song in Spanish done by Papi Sanchez, under the title "Dilema". The song was the 22nd best-selling single of the 2000 decade in the UK and appeared on the game Karaoke Revolution Presents: American Idol. Rowland's second worldwide hit "When Love Takes Over" (with French DJ David Guetta) received ten international nominations and won two awards. The single's Electro Extended Mix won a Grammy Awards in "Best Non-Classical, Remixed Recording" category. Other Rowland songs that have been nominated or awarded are "Commander" and "Motivation".

Entertainment Weekly named "Commander" the number-one summer jam of 2010 and it was named by Fitness Magazine as one of "The Top 100 Workout Songs of 2010".

Rowland was awarded Ultimate TV Personality at the 2011 Cosmopolitan Ultimate Women of the Year Awards, and TV Personality of the Year at the 2012 Glamour Women of the Year Awards. In 2012, Rowland was named one of Glamour's Best Dressed Women in entertainment. In 2020, Rowland was awarded an NAACP Image Award for her guest performance in the television series American Soul as Gladys Knight.

== Discography ==
Studio albums

- Simply Deep (2002)
- Ms. Kelly (2007)
- Here I Am (2011)
- Talk a Good Game (2013)

== Filmography ==
Films

- Freddy vs. Jason (2003)
- The Seat Filler (2005)
- Think Like a Man (2012)
- Love By the 10th Date (2017)
- Merry Liddle Christmas (2019)
- Bad Hair (2020)
- Merry Liddle Christmas Wedding (2020)
- Merry Liddle Christmas Baby (2021)
- Fantasy Football (2022)
- The Curse of Bridge Hollow (2022)
- Mea Culpa (2024)
- Relationship Goals (2026)

Television

- Clash of the Choirs (2007)
- The Fashion Show US (2009)
- The X Factor UK (2011)
- Everybody Dance Now (2012)
- The X Factor USA (2013)
- Chasing Destiny (2016)
- The Voice Australia (2017–2020)
- American Soul (2019)
- Grown-ish (2023–2024)
- Building the Band (2025)
- The Voice UK (2026–)

== Model and testimonial ==
- Testimonial for McDonald's (with Destiny's Child, 2004)
- Testimonial for Walmart (with Destiny's Child, 2005)
- Testimonial for Empress (2011)
- Creator of a line of wristwatches with "TW Steel" (2012)
- Model for Jaguar Cars (2013)
- Testimonial for Mercedes-Benz (2014, 2019)
- Model for Caress (2014)
- Testimonial and creator of a glasses line for Smoke + Mirrors (2018)
- Testimonial and designer of a gym dress line for Fabletics (2019–2020)
- Campaign #MyHairMyCrown with the music video of "Crown" for Dove (2019)
- Testimonial and model for a JustFab capsule collection (2020–present)
- Campaign for Oral-B (2020)
- Testimonial #BlackMaternalHealth for BabyDove (2022)
- Testimonial #Silk (2022)
- Testimonial for Black Beauty is Beauty campaign for Sephora (2022)
- Testimonial #EmbraceYOU campaign for Vaseline (2022)
- Testimonial #Airborne (2022–23)
- Testimonial #FamilyGuard (2023)

== Books ==
- Whoa, Baby!: A Guide for New Moms Who Feel Overwhelmed and Freaked Out (and Wonder What the #*$& Just Happened) (2017)
- Always With You, Always With Me (2022)
- Let's Get Started (2027)

== Tours ==
Headlining

- 2003: Simply Deeper Tour
- 2007: Ms. Kelly Tour
- 2013: Lights Out Tour

Supporting

- 2010: Supafest (Australia)
- 2011: F.A.M.E. Tour (North America)
- 2012: Supafest (Australia)
- 2017: RNB Fridays Live (Australia)
- 2023: Fridays Live (Australia)
- 2025: The Boy Is Mine Tour

== See also ==
- List of best-selling singles
- List of artists who reached number one in the United States
