= Everybody Dance Now (Australian TV series) =

- Logo for Everybody Dance Now (The dancer shown in the logo differs in each eyecatch)
- Genre: Dance competition
- Creative director: Jason Gilkison
- Presented by: Sarah Murdoch
- Judges: Jason Derülo; Kelly Rowland
- Theme music composer: Robert Clivillés & Freedom Williams
- Opening theme: "Gonna Make You Sweat (Everybody Dance Now)" by Justice Crew
- Country of origin: Australia
- Original language: English
- No. of seasons: 1
- No. of episodes: 4

Production
- Executive producer: Sandra Fulloon
- Production location: Melbourne
- Running time: 120 minutes
- Production company: FremantleMedia Australia

Original release
- Network: Network Ten
- Release: 12 August – 19 August 2012

Everybody Dance Now is an Australian reality television dance competition that premiered on 12 August 2012 on Network Ten. The show was produced by FremantleMedia Australia, and hosted by Sarah Murdoch.

Everybody Dance Now was open to solo acts, duos and groups of any age, style or size. They were divided into two teams, with each being led by the dance masters Jason Derülo and Kelly Rowland, who would "challenge, train and mentor" their acts. The teams faced a studio audience in each episode "to do battle in a colosseum-style dance duel." During the heats stage of the competition, eight acts would perform in each episode, with two acts winning A$10,000 and progressing through to the finals to compete for the ultimate prize of $250,000.

On 21 August 2012, as ratings were dwindling, Network Ten considered changing the weekly schedule for the show, from three half-hour episodes to one full hour episode a week, but when those plans fell through, it decided to cancel the show due to poor ratings. Remaining prize money was donated to charity.

== Overview ==
=== Format ===
Everybody Dance Now consisted of two phases: heats and finals. The show was open to dancers of all ages and styles, who were divided into two teams, with each being taken under the guidance of big name entertainment celebrities known as the dance masters, to do battle in a colosseum-style duel. During the heats stage of the competition, eight acts would perform during each episode in four duels. Once each duel was complete, the studio audience would vote for the act they think should progress through to the dance duel decider round. During this round, the studio audience would vote again for the two acts they think should win $10,000 and progress through to the finals. During the finals, dance acts would compete for the ultimate prize of $250,000. But there turned out to be no finals, and of course, no winners, due to the show's cancellation.

=== Production ===
Everybody Dance Now was filmed at a location in Melbourne with a live studio audience.

== Series summary ==
Season	Start	Finish	Host	Dance Masters
One	12 August 2012	19 August 2012	Sarah Murdoch	Jason Derülo; Kelly Rowland

=== International versions ===
Region/country	Local title	Network	Winners	Judge	Main presenters
Jordan	Everybody Dance Now	JTV 1		Omar Khalifa; Hadil Rawashdeh; Issa Shamali	Zaid Al-Momani; Dounia Mousa
Netherlands	Everybody Dance Now	RTL 4	Season 1, 2013: Justen Beer; Season 2, 2014: The Daddies	Jan Kooijman; Dan Karaty; Lieke van Lexmond	Chantal Janzen
Thailand	Thailand Dance Now เต้น...สุดขั้ว	Channel 3	Season 1, 2013: Unknown	Rattapoom Toekongsap; Cris Horwang; Samapol Piyapongsiri	Ekkachai Euasangkomsert; Borriboon Junrueng
