= Sarah Murdoch =

Australian model and television presenter

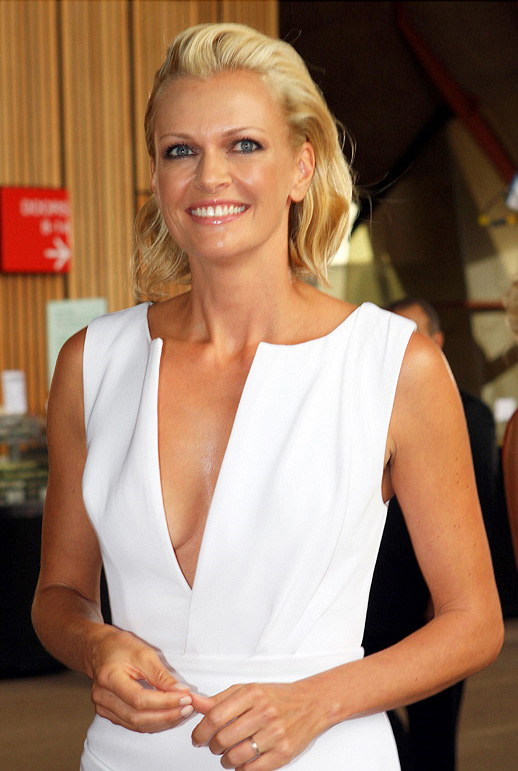
- Murdoch in 2011
- Born: Sarah O'Hare; 31 May 1972 (age 54); England
- Occupations: Model, actress, television presenter
- Years active: 1989–present
- Spouse: Lachlan Murdoch (m. 1999)
- Children: 3
- Modeling information
- Height: 178 cm (5 ft 10 in)
- Hair color: Blonde
- Eye color: Blue

Sarah Murdoch (née O'Hare) is a British-Australian model, actress, television presenter and philanthropist.

== Career ==
Born in England and raised in Sydney, Australia, Murdoch studied at Strathfield's The McDonald College of the Performing Arts, where she studied ballet.

Her modelling career began at the age of 17, after being signed to Vivien's Management in Sydney. Soon after she moved to Paris and started working as a runway model for Karl Lagerfeld, Issey Miyake, Chanel, Emanuel Ungaro, Gianfranco Ferré, Givenchy, Alberta Ferretti, Kenzo, Valentino and Oscar de la Renta. She appeared in campaigns for Bonds, L'Oréal, Revlon, Ralph Lauren, Yves Saint Laurent, and Estée Lauder, as well as the 1999 and 2003 Sports Illustrated Swimsuit issues. Her magazine covers include Vogue, Elle, Marie Claire, Glamour, GQ and Harper's Bazaar. She has appeared on magazine issue covers in Australia, Spain, the United Kingdom, and the United States.

In October 2013, Murdoch was a guest host on the Seven Network's Weekend Sunrise.

Murdoch starred with fellow model Shalom Harlow in the romantic comedy Head Over Heels. She also appeared in an episode of the seventh series of the sitcom, Friends.

Murdoch filled in for Jessica Rowe on the Nine Network's morning news and interview show, Today while Rowe was taking four months maternity leave.

On 26 March 2007, it was reported in The Sydney Morning Herald that Murdoch would finish up her hosting duties on Today and stepped down on 30 March 2007. Nine News presenter Kellie Sloane replaced Murdoch until May 2007, when Lisa Wilkinson took over as the new co-host on Today.

=== Australia's Next Top Model ===
In a multi-year deal with Australia’s pay television company, FOXTEL, Sarah was Executive Producer and host of Australia’s Next Top Model which became FOXTEL’s highest rating non-sports program. Murdoch replaced Jodhi Meares as host of Australia's Next Top Model after Meares made a series of errors in the third season's live finale in 2007 and flat-out refused to appear in 2008's finale. In addition to hosting Top Model and an executive producer on the show, Murdoch also signed a deal with Foxtel to create documentaries with her production company, Room 329 Productions. She experienced media scrutiny during the 2010 Australia's Next Top Model Grand Final for announcing an incorrect winner. In 2010 Top Model won the Australian Subscription Television and Radio Association (ASTRA) award for Most Outstanding Light Entertainment Program. In 2011 it won the Most Outstanding Reality Program and Murdoch won the ASTRA Award for Favorite Female Personality. 12 December 2011, Murdoch announced that she was leaving Top Model after three seasons.

=== Pride of Australia ===
Screened in November 2009, Murdoch and her production company Room 329 Productions, along with Foxtel, produced 4 episodes of Pride of Australia with Murdoch herself as host. The program tells inspiring stories of everyday Australians exhibiting acts of great courage, love and determination when faced with adversity. The stories were taken from thousands of people nominated to News Limited papers across Australia.

=== Everybody Dance Now ===
Murdoch hosted the Network Ten reality dance programme Everybody Dance Now in August 2012; however, due to poor ratings, the series was axed after just four episodes.

== Personal life ==
Sarah is the daughter of Carol and Patrick O'Hare. Her siblings include brothers Ryan, Shaun, and sister Samantha O'Hare.

In 1999, the then-Sarah O'Hare married Lachlan Murdoch, the eldest son of media mogul Rupert Murdoch. The couple reside in Bellevue Hill, Sydney, Australia. They have two sons, and a daughter.

Murdoch supports the Manly Sea Eagles.

== Philanthropic work ==
Sarah is an ambassador of the Murdoch Children's Research Institute and joined its board of directors in 2014. The institute was established in 1986 by her husband Lachlan's grandmother, Elisabeth Murdoch and is the largest child health research institute in Australia. Murdoch was a patron of Australia's National Breast Cancer Foundation, and addressed the National Press Club of Australia about the activities of the foundation on 4 October 2006 and again on 24 December 2008. The addresses were televised Australia-wide by the Australian Broadcasting Corporation.

Murdoch has served as a board member of New York’s Public Theater and founded and chaired its young patron program to attract younger supporters to the theater. In Australia, Murdoch served on the board of the Australian Research Alliance for Children and Youth (ARACY) working with government for better efficiency and efficacy in services to Australia’s most vulnerable children. Sarah was a member of the Global Council of the American Ballet Theater.

Murdoch served as Patron of the National Breast Cancer Foundation (NBCF) Australia for over eighteen years. She was awarded both the Inaugural Advocacy for Breast Cancer Research Award and the Honorary Award for Extraordinary Service.

Sarah also served on the board of the Global Access Partners (GAP) Taskforce on Early Childhood Education and the Federal Government’s National Body Image Advisory Group. Sarah has served on the Harvard-Westlake School and Carlthorp School boards of Trustees.

In 2023, Lachlan and Sarah Murdoch gave one million dollars to a queer museum Qtopia, located in the old Darlinghurst Police Station.

In 2007, Sarah co-authored Birth Skills, a book that provides education for new mothers around labour and birth.

Sarah holds an MBA from The University of Technology Sydney and is a graduate of the Australian Institute of Company Directors (GAICD).
