= Fitness (magazine) =

United States-based women's magazine

- Cover of the January 2015 issue of Fitness featuring Demi Lovato
- Editor-in-Chief: Betty Wong
- Categories: Fitness; Health; Lifestyle
- Frequency: 10 / year
- Publisher: Lee Slattery
- Total circulation: 1,501,244 (2011)
- First issue: 1992
- Final issue: April 2015 (print)
- Company: Dotdash Meredith
- Country: United States
- Based in: New York City
- Language: American English
- Website: www.fitnessmagazine.com
- ISSN: 1060-9237

Fitness is a United States–based women's magazine, focusing on health, exercise, and nutrition. It is owned and published by the Dotdash Meredith (formerly Meredith Corporation). The editor-in-chief of Fitness is Betty Wong.

== History ==
Fitness was launched in 1992, and was acquired by the Meredith Corporation from Bertelsmann's Gruner + Jahr in 2005. In 2005, Fitness also launched its web presence, giving readers separate online resources for fitness and health tips alongside the magazine's monthly editorial content. Betty Wong became Editor-in-Chief in September 2008, incorporating several changes to the magazine, creating several new columns and features. In 2009, Fitness posted significant ad page gains according to the Publishers Information Bureau, increasing by 18.4% when overall magazine publishers' counts were down 27.9% industry-wide. It was recognized for several awards, having been awarded "Most Improved Publication" and best "How-To/Instructional" feature in minOnline's Editorial and Design Awards.

On January 28, 2015, it was reported that Meredith Corp. would acquire Shape Magazine which would be merged with Fitness magazine in May 2015. The Fitness website would continue to operate.

== Features ==
Fitness editorial content centers largely on exercise, nutrition, health, and beauty. Fitness also conducts several real-world fitness and health-themed events to promote its brand and raise money for charity, including the Mind, Body, Spirit Games and a half-marathon in conjunction with fellow Meredith publication More magazine.
