= Destiny's Child World Tour =

2002 concert tour by Destiny's Child

- Tour by Destiny's Child
- Location: Asia; Europe; Oceania
- Associated album: Survivor
- Start date: April 29, 2002
- End date: June 24, 2002
- Legs: 3
- No. of shows: 37
- Supporting acts: Devin; Solange Knowles; Play; Shakaya

Destiny's Child concert chronology
- Total Request Live Tour (2001); Destiny's Child World Tour (2002); Destiny Fulfilled... and Lovin' It (2005)

Destiny's Child World Tour (alternatively titled Destiny's Child Tour 2002) was the debut headlining concert tour by American girl group Destiny's Child. It was launched in support of their third studio album Survivor (2001). Initially conceived as an extension of the Total Request Live Tour—which Destiny's Child co-headlined alongside 3LW, Dream, Eve, Nelly, St. Lunatics, Jessica Simpson and City High through North America from July to September 2001—it was postponed in the aftermath of September 11 attacks. Destiny's Child World Tour ultimately commenced in Melbourne, Australia on April 29, 2002 and ended in Belfast, Northern Ireland on June 24, after 37 shows across Oceania, Japan and Europe.

Alongside tracks from Survivor, the set list for the Destiny's Child World Tour also incorporated songs from Destiny's Child's eponymous debut studio album (1998) and The Writing's on the Wall (1999), as well as Beyoncé, Kelly Rowland and Michelle Williams' respective solo performances. Beyoncé's younger sister Solange Knowles joined the group as a supporting act during the tour's European leg to promote her then-upcoming debut studio album Solo Star (2002).

Destiny's Child World Tour was a commercial success and received positive reviews from critics, who commended the group members' showmanship and vocal performances. The concert at Rotterdam Ahoy in Rotterdam, Netherlands was recorded and released on a video album, titled Destiny's Child World Tour, on July 8, 2003.

== Background and development ==
Destiny's Child World Tour was Destiny's Child's first solely headlined concert tour. After serving as opening acts for TLC and Christina Aguilera throughout 1999–2000, in support of their second studio album The Writing's on the Wall (1999), the group embarked on the MTV-sponsored Total Request Live Tour. In an appearance on Total Request Live on May 1, 2001, they revealed the tour's itinerary, which included concerts across North America from July 18 until September 23. (Note: While the tour was originally scheduled to run until September 23, 2001, its final show, among numerous others, was cancelled in the aftermath of September 11 attacks. Hence, the tour ended on September 21.) The group co-headlined the tour alongside 3LW, Dream, Eve, Nelly, St. Lunatics and Jessica Simpson. (Note: While Simpson was originally one of the headlining acts, she later withdrew from the tour and was replaced by City High.) While the Destiny's Child World Tour was set to be a direct overseas continuation of the Total Request Live Tour running throughout fall 2001, it was postponed in the aftermath of September 11 attacks, and the group instead focused on promotional activities for their first Christmas album 8 Days of Christmas (2001). Despite the group having announced a hiatus in order for members to focus on solo endeavors a week earlier, a Columbia Records representative announced the tour for spring 2002 in a press release on December 13, 2001. Beyoncé's younger sister Solange Knowles was further announced as a supporting act.

== Reception ==
The Destiny's Child World Tour stop at the Ericsson Stadium in Auckland on May 4, 2002 attracted a crowd of over 13,000. In his review of the show for The New Zealand Herald, Russell Baillie praised Destiny's Child's performance skills, describing their stage presence as "terrific, visually dazzling and altogether larger than life" before concluding: "By the time they reached the encore and a strident version of Survivor, Destiny's Child had proven themselves as phenomenal live as they are on the charts." The group opened BBC Radio 1's annual free concert One Big Sunday in Swansea, Wales on June 16, performing in front of 70,000 spectators. In their review of the show, BBC News wrote the members "sauntered on stage with a chic latin look, sporting designer jeans and lacy tops. The sexy American three-piece got the crowd going as they ran through their catalogue of hits", before rushing off due to their show at the NIA Academy in Birmingham that evening.

== Set list ==
The following set list is representative of the show at Rotterdam Ahoy on May 21, 2002, not of all concerts for the duration of the tour.

1. "Independent Women Part I"
2. "No, No, No Part 2"
3. "Bug a Boo"
4. "Bills, Bills, Bills"
5. "Get on the Bus"
6. "Nasty Girl"
7. "Emotion"
8. "Ooh Child"
9. "Heard a Word"
10. "Dangerously in Love"
11. "Gospel Medley"
12. "Bootylicious"
13. "Say My Name"
14. "Work It Out"
15. "Proud Mary"
16. "Jumpin', Jumpin'"
17. "Survivor"
18. "Happy Face"

== Tour dates ==
List of concerts
Date (2002)	City	Country	Venue	Opening act(s)	Ref.
April 29	Melbourne	Australia	Rod Laver Arena	Shakaya	
May 1	Sydney	Australia	Sydney Entertainment Centre	Shakaya	
May 2	Sydney	Australia	Sydney Entertainment Centre	Shakaya	
May 3	Brisbane	Australia	Brisbane Entertainment Centre	Shakaya	
May 4	Auckland	New Zealand	Ericsson Stadium	Shakaya	
May 8 (Note: The concert of May 8, 2002 at the Osaka-jō Hall in Osaka was originally scheduled to take place on October 18, 2001.)	Osaka	Japan	Osaka-jō Hall	—	
May 10 (Note: The concert of May 10, 2002 at the Yokohama Arena in Yokohama was originally scheduled to take place on October 19, 2001.)	Yokohama	Japan	Yokohama Arena	—	
May 11 (Note: The concert of May 11, 2002 at the Yokohama Arena in Yokohama was originally scheduled to take place on October 20, 2001.)	Yokohama	Japan	Yokohama Arena	—	
May 15 (Note: The concert of May 15, 2002 at the Sportpaleis in Antwerp was originally scheduled to take place on November 5, 2001.)	Antwerp	Belgium	Sportpaleis	Play; Solange Knowles	
May 16	Paris	France	Palais Omnisports de Paris-Bercy	Play; Solange Knowles	
May 17 (Note: The concert of May 17, 2002 at the Hanns-Martin-Schleyer-Halle in Stuttgart was originally scheduled to take place on October 30, 2001.)	Stuttgart	Germany	Hanns-Martin-Schleyer-Halle	Play; Solange Knowles	
May 18	Freiburg im Breisgau	Germany	Neue Messehalle	Play; Solange Knowles	
May 20 (Note: The concert of May 20, 2002 at the Kölnarena in Cologne was originally scheduled to take place on October 28, 2001.)	Cologne	Germany	Kölnarena	Play; Solange Knowles	
May 21 (Note: The concert of May 21, 2002 at the Rotterdam Ahoy in Rotterdam was originally scheduled to take place on November 6, 2001.)	Rotterdam	Netherlands	Rotterdam Ahoy	Play; Solange Knowles	
May 22 (Note: The concert of May 22, 2002 at the Rotterdam Ahoy in Rotterdam was originally scheduled to take place on November 7, 2001.)	Rotterdam	Netherlands	Rotterdam Ahoy	Play; Solange Knowles	
May 25 (Note: The concert of May 25, 2002 at the Forum in Copenhagen was originally scheduled to take place on October 25, 2001.)	Copenhagen	Denmark	Forum Copenhagen	Play; Solange Knowles	
May 27	Oslo	Norway	Oslo Spektrum	Play; Solange Knowles	
May 28 (Note: The concert of May 28, 2002 at the Globe Arena in Stockholm was originally scheduled to take place on October 24, 2001.)	Stockholm	Sweden	Stockholm Globe Arena	Play; Solange Knowles	
May 30	Bremen	Germany	Stadthalle Bremen	Play; Solange Knowles	
May 31 (Note: The concert of May 31, 2002 at the Alsterdorfer Sporthalle in Hamburg was originally scheduled to take place on October 26, 2001.)	Hamburg	Germany	Alsterdorfer Sporthalle	Play; Solange Knowles	
June 1 (Note: The concert of June 1, 2002 at the Velodrom in Berlin was originally scheduled to take place on November 1, 2001.)	Berlin	Germany	Velodrom	Play; Solange Knowles	
June 2	Munich	Germany	Olympiahalle	Play; Solange Knowles	
June 3 (Note: The concert of June 3, 2002 at the Festhalle in Frankfurt was originally scheduled to take place on October 29, 2001.)	Frankfurt	Germany	Festhalle Frankfurt	Play; Solange Knowles	
June 7 (Note: The concert of June 7, 2002 at the London Arena in London was originally scheduled to take place on November 18, 2001.)	London	England	London Arena	Devin	
June 8 (Note: The concert of June 8, 2002 at the London Arena in London was originally scheduled to take place on November 19, 2001.)	London	England	London Arena	Devin	
June 9 (Note: The concert of June 9, 2002 at the Sheffield Arena in Sheffield was originally scheduled to take place on November 10, 2001.)	Sheffield	England	Sheffield Arena	Devin	
June 11 (Note: The concert of June 11, 2002 at the Telewest Arena in Newcastle upon Tyne was originally scheduled to take place on November 11, 2001.)	Newcastle upon Tyne	England	Telewest Arena	Devin	
June 12	Newcastle upon Tyne	England	Telewest Arena	Devin	
June 13 (Note: The concert of June 13, 2002 at the Manchester Evening News Arena in Manchester was originally scheduled to take place on November 17, 2001.)	Manchester	England	Manchester Evening News Arena	Devin	
June 14	Manchester	England	Manchester Evening News Arena	Devin	
June 16 (Note: The concert of June 16, 2002 in Swansea was a part of BBC Radio 1's One Big Sunday.)	Swansea	Wales	—	Solange Knowles	
June 16 (Note: The concert of June 16, 2002 at the NIA Academy in Birmingham was originally scheduled to take place on November 14, 2001.)	Birmingham	England	NIA Academy	Devin	
June 17 (Note: The concert of June 17, 2002 at the NIA Academy in Birmingham was originally scheduled to take place on November 15, 2001.)	Birmingham	England	NIA Academy	Devin	
June 18 (Note: The concert of June 18, 2002 at the Wembley Arena in London was originally scheduled to take place on November 20, 2001.)	London	England	Wembley Arena	Devin	
June 19	London	England	Wembley Arena	Devin	
June 21	Dublin	Ireland	Point Theatre	Devin	
June 23 (Note: The concert of June 23, 2002 at the Odyssey Centre in Belfast was originally scheduled to take place on November 12, 2001.)	Belfast	Northern Ireland	Odyssey Centre	Devin	
June 24	Belfast	Northern Ireland	Odyssey Centre	Devin	

== Personnel ==
Credits are adapted from the liner notes of Destiny's Child World Tour.

- Marybeth Adams – public relations
- Richard Alexander – artist security
- Clark Anderson – video technology
- Mick Anger – video direction
- Steve Arch – lighting
- Robert Bacon – guitar, musical direction
- Angela Beyincé – artist assistance
- Marlon Bowers – tour assistance
- Anthony Brigham – security
- Phil Broad – head rigging
- Lee Bryant – training, wardrobe assistance
- William Burke – programming
- Ot'than Burnside – dancer
- Kim Burse – A&R direction, creative direction
- Eric Camp – front house engineering
- Aaron Carter – lead carpentering
- Courtney Carter – tour management
- Aisha Delario – alternate dancer
- Al Domanski – pyrotechnic assistance
- Napolian Dumo – dancer
- Tabitha Dumo – dancer
- Terrill Eastman – venue security
- Jeanette Everett – fan club direction
- Maurice Fitzgerald – bass guitar
- Alan Floyd – new media direction
- Nathaniel Frazier – dancer
- Gary – lighting
- Rod Gibson – lighting direction
- Kelvin Gill – artist security
- Collin Green – lighting
- Robert Harris – alternate dancer
- Dave Howard – tour accountancy
- Ty Hunter – styling assistance
- Lance "KC" Jackson – stage management
- Redo Jackson – camera operation, video technology
- Rece Jones – dancer
- Beyoncé Knowles – artist
- Mathew Knowles – management
- Tina Knowles – styling
- Ruary Macphie – video technology
- Paul Makin – lighting
- James Mcgregor – keyboard technology
- Freddie Moffett – keyboards
- Mario Navarrett – dancer
- Nicole Neal – dancer
- Huy Nguyen – A&R assistance
- Olie C – video technology
- Wade Padgett – pyrotechnics
- Simon Pagani – carpentering
- Khari Parker – drums
- Bennett Paysinger – keyboards
- Johnny Perkins – carpentering, rigging
- Shane Preston – lighting direction
- Ivan Prosper – drum technology
- Kelly Rowland – artist
- Junella Segura – choreography
- Sanaa Shariff – production assistance
- Sherman Shoate – dancer
- Vernon Smith – venue security
- Blake Suid – monitor engineering
- Christina Villarreal – head wardrobe
- Andrew Wiliford – guitar technology
- Michelle Williams – artist
- Norman Williams – production management
- Phil Woodhead – video technology
- Marc Wuchter – lighting

== Broadcasts and recordings ==
Destiny's Child World Tour

Video by Destiny's Child
- Released: July 3, 2003
- Recorded: May 21, 2002
- Venue: Rotterdam Ahoy (Rotterdam)
- Genre: R&B
- Length: 82:54
- Labels: Columbia; Music World
- Directors: Mirko Cocco; Sanaa Hamri; Sylvain White
- Producer: John van Dijk

Destiny's Child chronology
The Platinum's on the Wall (2001)	Destiny's Child World Tour (2003)	Live in Atlanta (2006)

The show in Swansea, Wales, performed as part of BBC Radio 1's annual festival One Big Sunday on June 16, 2002, aired live via BBC Radio 1. The broadcast was televised via BBC Choice on June 22.

The concert at Rotterdam Ahoy on May 21, 2002 was recorded for the video album Destiny's Child World Tour. The album was released on July 3, 2003, by Columbia Records and Music World Entertainment. A commercial success, it reached number three on the US Music Video Sales chart.

On October 30, 2026, the recording of the tour's stop at Olympiahalle in Munich, performed on June 2, 2002, was made available for streaming via Destiny's Child's official website, by Music World Entertainment.

=== Track listing ===
Destiny's Child World Tour
No.	Title	Length
1.	"Program Start"	1:48
2.	"Independent Women Part I"	3:31
3.	"No, No, No Part 2"	2:43
4.	"Bug a Boo"	2:30
5.	"Bills, Bills, Bills"	3:30
6.	"Get on the Bus"	3:23
7.	"Nasty Girl"	3:10
8.	"Emotion"	4:01
9.	"Ooh Child"	2:26
10.	"Heard a Word"	4:04
11.	"Dangerously in Love"	6:21
12.	"Gospel Medley"	3:51
13.	"Bootylicious"	3:16
14.	"Say My Name"	4:16
15.	"Work It Out"	3:34
16.	"Proud Mary"	1:26
17.	"Jumpin', Jumpin'"	7:45
18.	"Survivor"	4:01
19.	"Happy Face"	5:13
20.	"Feelin' You" (Part II) (Solange Knowles music video)	4:04
21.	"Stole" (Kelly Rowland music video)	4:18
22.	"Heard a Word" (Michelle Williams music video)	3:43

=== Personnel ===
Credits are adapted from the liner notes.

- Guido Aalbers – recording production
- Guus Albregts – camera
- Paul Alexander – photography
- Antoine Altena – VTR
- Kryssy Bloch – DVD menu production
- Jeroen Bos – ENG
- Frank Brusselaar – grip
- Kim Burse – A&R direction
- Alice V. Butts – package design
- Thom Cadley – sound mixing
- Mirko Cocco – direction
- Ramon de Boer – camera
- Udo Flasselaar – grip
- Mari Keiko Gonzalez – editing
- Henk Grit – ENG
- Ton Groen – managing direction
- Pieter Hilbers – associate production
- Pim Janssen – vision engineering
- Mathew Knowles – executive production
- Christopher Koch – audio post
- Mike Kuipers – assistance
- Robert Lanting – vision engineering
- Stephanie Masarsky – title graphic design
- Mike Nack – DVD authoring
- Jorre Numan – assistance
- Sue Pelino – audio post
- Darcy Proper – mastering
- Joseph Roeder – DVD menu production
- Fred Salkind – title graphic design
- Paul Schoenmakers – recording engineering
- Jeff Staadt – post-production supervision
- Marc Stecker – DVD authoring
- Andre Swart – senior sound engineering
- Martijn Swart – VTR
- Joost Tenniglo – camera
- Niels van Brakel – camera
- Jan van de Akker – assistance
- John van Dijk – production
- Mark van Knippenberg – assistance
- Arjan van Loon – assistance
- Edwin van Seben – senior vision engineering
- Johan Veerman – vision mixing
- Edwin Vermeulen – camera
- Maarten Verstraete – camera
- Rob Washburn – DVD menu production
- Pascal Wasterval – operational unit management
- Dennis Westenberg – camera
- Teresa LaBarbera Whites – A&R

=== Charts ===
2003 weekly chart performance
Chart	Peak position
Australian Music DVD (ARIA)	16
Dutch Music DVD (MegaCharts)	5
UK Music Videos (Official Charts)	3
US Music Video Sales (Billboard)	3

2003 year-end chart performance
Chart	Position
Dutch Music DVD (MegaCharts)	99

=== Certifications ===
Certifications and sales
Region	Certification	Certified units/sales
Australia (ARIA)	Platinum	15,000^{^}
France (SNEP)	Gold	10,000^{*}
United Kingdom (BPI)	Gold	25,000^{*}
^{*} Sales figures based on certification alone.^{^} Shipments figures based on certification alone.

=== Release history ===
Release dates and formats
Region	Date	Format(s)	Label(s)	Ref.
France	July 3, 2003	DVD	Epic	
United States	July 8, 2003	DVD	Columbia; Music World	
Australia	July 11, 2003	DVD	Sony	
Germany	July 21, 2003	DVD	Sony	
Italy	July 21, 2003	DVD	Sony	
Japan	December 3, 2003	DVD	Sony Japan	
