= Teresa LaBarbera Whites =

American A&R, music executive, talent scout, executive producer

- Born: Texas, United States
- Musical career
- Genres: R&B; pop; adult contemporary; rock
- Occupations: A&R; music executive; talent scout; executive producer
- Labels: Columbia; Epic; Jive; Zomba; Bellasonic; Sony; Parkwood; Highbank Entertainment

Teresa LaBarbera Whites is an American A&R, music executive, talent scout, and executive producer, who is best known for discovering Destiny's Child and Jessica Simpson. Previously the A&R executive for Beyoncé and Chloe x Halle, she has recently reunited with Simpson.

== Career ==
Originally the Southwest regional talent scout for Sony Music in the 1990s, Whites was offered an A&R position with Columbia Records, pitching and signing Destiny's Child and Jessica Simpson to Columbia. Over the next eight years, she would organize several multi-platinum projects: The Writing's on the Wall (1999), Sweet Kisses (1999), Survivor (2001), Dangerously in Love (2003), In This Skin (2003), and Destiny Fulfilled (2004). Whites was then offered the Jive/Zomba Vice-President of A&R position, where she would oversee the direction of Nick Lachey's 2006 solo breakthrough album What's Left of Me, as well as various Backstreet Boys, JC Chasez, and Britney Spears projects. Whites would eventually reunite with Destiny's Child member Beyoncé Knowles in 2011, first becoming Senior Vice-President, A&R of Columbia Records, and then becoming the A&R executive for Knowles' label imprint Parkwood Entertainment, overseeing song selection for her eponymous fifth album, Lemonade, and several other projects.

In 2022, Whites parted ways with Parkwood Entertainment to become CEO and owner of her own music agency Highbank Entertainment. Her first project was to oversee Chloe Bailey's 2023 debut solo album In Pieces. In 2025, Whites reunited with Simpson, helping to manage and oversee her 2025 comeback project Nashville Canyon, P.1.

== Selected executive production and A&R credits ==
Credits are courtesy of Discogs, Tidal, Apple Music, and AllMusic.

Artist	Year	Album	Label
Three On A Hill	1989	Three On A Hill	Independent Release
Destiny's Child	1998	Destiny's Child	Music World / Columbia Records
Destiny's Child	1999	The Writing's on the Wall	Columbia Records
Jessica Simpson	1999	Sweet Kisses	Columbia Records
Destiny's Child	2001	Survivor	Columbia Records
Destiny's Child	2001	8 Days of Christmas	Columbia Records
Jessica Simpson	2001	Irresistible	Columbia Records
Various Artists	2001	MTV's Hip Hopera: Carmen	MTV / Music World / Columbia / Sony Music Entertainment
Solange Knowles	2002	Solo Star	Music World / Columbia Records
Destiny's Child	2002	This Is the Remix	Music World / Columbia Records
Michelle Williams	2002	Heart to Yours	Sanctuary Records / Columbia Records
Kelly Rowland	2002	Simply Deep	Music World / Columbia Records
Jessica Simpson	2002	This Is the Remix	Columbia Records
Beyoncé	2003	Dangerously in Love	Music World / Columbia Records
Jessica Simpson	2003	In This Skin	Columbia Records
Various Artists	2003	The Fighting Temptations (Music From The Motion Picture)	Music World / Columbia Records
Rose Falcon	2003	Rose Falcon	Columbia Records
Michelle Williams	2004	Do You Know	Columbia Records
Jessica Simpson	2004	ReJoyce: The Christmas Album	Columbia Records
Destiny's Child	2004	Destiny Fulfilled	Columbia Records / Sony Urban Music
Backstreet Boys	2005	Never Gone	Jive Records
Dirtie Blonde	2006	Dirtie Blonde	Jive Records
Nick Lachey	2006	What's Left of Me	Jive Records / Zomba
Britney Spears	2007	Blackout	Jive Records / Zomba
Backstreet Boys	2007	Unbreakable	Jive Records
JC Chasez	2007	Story Of Kate (Shelved)	Jive Records
Amie Miriello	2008	I Came Around	Bellasonic / Jive Records
Britney Spears	2008	Circus	Jive Records / Zomba
Backstreet Boys	2009	This Is Us	Jive Records / Sony Music
Allison Iraheta	2009	Just Like You	19 Entertainment / Jive Records
Bowling for Soup	2009	Sorry for Partyin'	Jive Records / RCA Records
Beyoncé	2011	4	Parkwood Entertainment / Columbia Records
Beyoncé	2013	Beyoncé	Parkwood Entertainment / Columbia Records
MKTO	2014	MKTO	Columbia Records
Katharine McPhee	2015	Hysteria	eOne
Beyoncé	2016	Lemonade	Parkwood Entertainment / Columbia Records
The Carters	2018	Everything Is Love	Roc Nation / Parkwood Entertainment / Sony Music
Beyoncé	2019	HΘMΣCΘMING: The Live Album	Parkwood Entertainment / Columbia Records
Beyoncé & Various Artists	2019	The Lion King: The Gift	Parkwood Entertainment / Columbia Records
Chloe x Halle	2021	Ungodly Hour: Chrome Edition	Parkwood Entertainment / Columbia Records
Chlöe	2023	In Pieces	Parkwood Entertainment / Columbia Records
Jessica Simpson	2025	Nashville Canyon, Pt. 1	Nashville Canyon Records
Jessica Simpson	2025	Nashville Canyon, Pt. 2	Nashville Canyon Records
Beyoncé	2026	B'Day: 20th Anniversary Edition	Parkwood Entertainment / Columbia Records

== Awards and nominations ==
Year	Ceremony	Award	Result	Ref/Notes
2009	Premios Oye! 2009	Album Of The Year - English (Circus)	Nominated	Note: Executive Producer Album Award
