= Survivor (Destiny's Child album) =

Studio album by Destiny's Child
- Released: April 25, 2001
- Recorded: May 2000 – February 2001
- Studios: 24/7 (Houston); Chase (Atlanta); Chung King (New York); Digital Services (Houston); The Enterprise (Burbank); The Hit Factory (New York); House of Music (Oakland); Lobo (Babylon); Signet Sound (Los Angeles); Sony (New York); Sound on Sound (New York); Soundtrack (New York); Stay Tuned (Atlanta); SugarHill (Houston); TK (Honolulu); WallyWorld (Marin County)
- Genres: R&B; pop
- Length: 59:37
- Label: Columbia
- Producers: Walter Afanasieff; Anthony Dent; Damon Elliott; Ken Fambro; Mark J. Feist; Rob Fusari; Calvin Gaines; Beyoncé Knowles; Mathew Knowles; Bill Lee; Errol "Poppi" McCalla Jr.; Falonte Moore; Poke & Tone; Cory Rooney; Eric Seats; Soulshock & Karlin; Rapture Stewart; Dwayne Wiggins

Destiny's Child chronology
The Writing's on the Wall (1999)	Survivor (2001)	8 Days of Christmas (2001)

Singles from Survivor
- 1. "Survivor" Released: March 6, 2001; 2. "Bootylicious" Released: May 22, 2001; 3. "Emotion" Released: September 4, 2001; 4. "Nasty Girl" Released: March 4, 2002

Survivor is the third studio album by American girl group Destiny's Child. It was released on April 25, 2001, by Columbia Records. As their breakthrough second studio album The Writing's on the Wall (1999) became a rising commercial success, Destiny's Child faced the controversial departure of original members LeToya Luckett and LaTavia Roberson, who were replaced with Farrah Franklin and Michelle Williams, in February 2000. Soon afterwards, they commenced production of their third studio album, tentatively titled Independent Women.

Mere five months after joining, Franklin departed from the group in July 2000, and "Independent Women Part I" was subsequently released as a single from the accompanying soundtrack for the film Charlie's Angels (2000). The song became a global commercial success and the group's third US Billboard Hot 100 number-one single. Retitling the album Survivor in reference to the turmoil surrounding their line-up alterations, Destiny's Child enlisted producers such as Anthony Dent, Damon Elliott, Mark J. Feist, Rob Fusari and Keybeats alongside Beyoncé Knowles, who produced all and co-wrote nearly all of the album's tracks. Their final product was an R&B and pop record incorporating genres such as dance, funk and hip hop. Its lyrical themes explore dynamics between women, self-esteem, independence and romantic relationships.

Upon its release, Survivor received generally positive reviews, mostly aimed at its production, while its balladry, length and lyrical content ignited criticism. Retrospective critical commentaries have credited the record for its impact on mainstream music of the 2000s and for serving as foundation for Knowles' eventual solo career. A global commercial success, the album debuted atop the US Billboard 200 with first-week sales of 663,000 units, becoming Destiny's Child's first and only number-one studio album on the chart. It has gone on to be certified quadruple platinum by the Recording Industry Association of America (RIAA). At the 44th Annual Grammy Awards (2002), the album was nominated for Best R&B Album. By 2004, it had sold over 10 million copies worldwide, being among the best-selling girl group albums of all time.

Survivor produced four singles. Its title track peaked at number two on the US Billboard Hot 100 and reached the top ten in 18 additional countries. In 2002, it won the Grammy Award for Best R&B Performance by a Duo or Group with Vocals. "Bootylicious" became Destiny's Child's fourth US Billboard Hot 100 number-one single and attained international success. "Emotion" became a US Billboard Hot 100 top-ten hit in the wake of the September 11 attacks, while "Nasty Girl" was released only overseas and achieved moderate success. The album was further promoted with the co-headlining Total Request Live Tour (2001) and the Destiny's Child World Tour (2002). After the latter's conclusion, the group embarked on a two-year hiatus, during which each member released a solo studio album to varying levels of success.

== Background and development ==
In July 1999, Destiny's Child released their second studio album The Writing's on the Wall. Their breakthrough record, it debuted at number six on the US Billboard 200 with first-week sales of 133,000 units. In December, LeToya Luckett and LaTavia Roberson tried to split with Destiny's Child's manager Mathew Knowles, claiming that he was keeping too much of the group's profits and that he favored his daughter Beyoncé Knowles and Kelly Rowland. When the accompanying music video for "Say My Name" premiered in February 2000, Roberson and Luckett found out that they were being replaced with Michelle Williams, a former backing vocalist for Monica, and Farrah Franklin, an aspiring singer-actress. On March 15, Roberson and Luckett filed a lawsuit against Mathew Knowles and their former bandmates for breach of partnership and fiduciary duties. Following the lawsuit, both sides were disparaging towards each other in the media. However, the group's prominence and commercial success burgeoned, aided by "Say My Name", which peaked atop the US Billboard Hot 100. The Writing's on the Wall subsequently registered a significant rise in sales, ascending towards a new peak at number five on the Billboard 200.

In July 2000, it was announced that Franklin had departed Destiny's Child five months after joining. According to the group, she missed a handful of promotional appearances and concerts and was asked to leave the group. However, Franklin stated that she quit because of negative energy within the group and her inability to assert any control in decision-making. The group had already begun recording material for their third studio album, with Franklin performing backing vocals on several tracks. Among those was "Independent Women Part I", which was recorded for the accompanying soundtrack for the 2000 film Charlie's Angels. The song was released as a single on August 29. A global commercial success, it became the group's third US Billboard Hot 100 and first UK Singles Chart number-one single. It was nominated for Best Song Written for a Motion Picture, Television or Other Visual Media at the 43rd Annual Grammy Awards. Towards the end of 2000, Roberson and Luckett dropped the portion of their lawsuit aimed at Beyoncé and Rowland in exchange for a settlement, though they continued the action against Mathew Knowles. As part of the agreement, both sides were prohibited from speaking about each other publicly.

== Recording and production ==
"There was not even 10 minutes between the albums, which I was kind of upset about at first. I felt like we needed a fair shot at making this record. We wanted a little more time to vibe the songs out and concentrate exclusively on the process of making this record. We didn't even have two consecutive days of recording. We did it completely on the fly. It was very hard, but it ultimately worked out well. It's a testimony to how close we've become as a group. We managed to have a great time working on this album as a team."

— Beyoncé Knowles reflecting on the production of Survivor.

The recording sessions for Survivor commenced in May 2000 at the SugarHill Recording Studios in Houston, where most of the album was recorded. "Gospel Medley", which Destiny's Child had previewed during several public appearances throughout 2000, was also recorded there; the group decided to record it due to their longtime affinity for gospel. As on the group's previous records, their manager Mathew Knowles served as the executive producer. Initial tracks recorded for the album were in the vein of "Jumpin', Jumpin'", which was released as the fourth and final single from The Writing's on the Wall within that period, to tremendous commercial success. However, as the recording progressed, the group gradually added more depth to their work as there were "so many people copping [their] sound, it was necessary to change things up a bit." After emerging as the focal point of Destiny's Child, Knowles assumed more control by taking a greater hand in songwriting and even producing some of the album herself. Knowles' intention was not to monopolize the spotlight; however, she did co-write 17 and produce all of the album's 18 tracks. She explained: "I only wanted to do like three songs... The label kept saying "Do another song, do another song, do another song". It wasn't planned. It wasn't like I said, OK, I'm going to take charge." However, Kelly Rowland and Michelle Williams co-wrote only one track–"Outro (DC-3) Thank You". On July 20, Farrah Franklin departed from Destiny's Child, having already recorded backing vocals for several tracks, including "Independent Women Part I". The group embarked on Christina Aguilera's tour Christina Aguilera in Concert as an opening act on July 31, touring until October and simultaneously recording the album. Six songs, including both parts to "Independent Women", "Nasty Girl" and the unreleased "I Tried", had been recorded by September.

Originally, the Keybeats-produced "Independent Women Part II" was recorded first as the song's album version, while the track which would become "Independent Women Part I" served as a remix. However, their roles were reversed as the group was offered to record material for the accompanying soundtrack to Charlie's Angels (2000), a film adaption of the 1976–1981 television series of the same title. They re-recorded "Independent Women" and enlisted first-time collaborators Trackmasters to produce the track, altering the original's lyrics to suit the Charlie's Angels theme. Cory Rooney, who co-wrote and produced the re-recording, said it took only 15 minutes for him and the Trackmasters to create the instrumental track. Aside from the SugarHill Recording Studios, part one was recorded at the Lobo Studios in Deer Park, New York and the TK Studios in Honolulu, while part two was recorded at the Chung King Studios in New York City and the 24/7 Studios in Houston. The Anthony Dent-produced title track was inspired by a pun a radio station had made about the fact that three members had already left Destiny's Child, comparing the group to the reality competition television series Survivor. Knowles felt inspired to use the negative comment and turn its context positive by writing a song out of it. According to Williams, the song was recorded from September to November. It was recorded at the Chase Studios in Atlanta–where fellow Dent production was also recorded–and, alongside numerous other tracks, at the Enterprise Studios in Burbank, California.

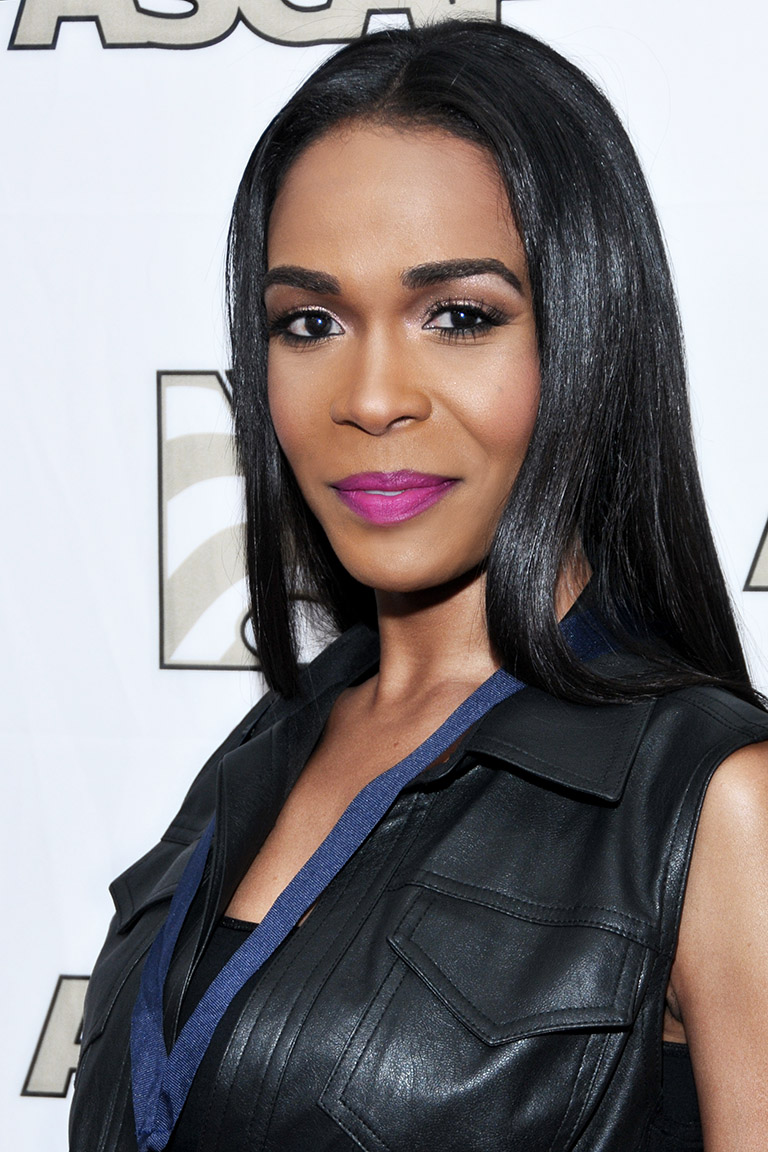
Survivor was Destiny's Child's first album to be recorded with Michelle Williams (pictured) after she joined the group in February 2000. Her sole songwriting credit on the album is for "Outro (DC-3) Thank You".

Beyoncé claimed to have written "Bootylicious" on a plane flight to London while listening to the song "Edge of Seventeen" by Stevie Nicks, when the word "bootylicious" popped into her head. Rob Fusari disputed the claim in 2010, stating he himself had the idea for the song and had wanted to use a guitar riff from Survivor's 1982 song "Eye of the Tiger" but, after not being able to find it, used a similar riff from "Edge of Seventeen". However, in 2016, he revealed that after the "Edge of Seventeen" sample was approved, he conceived the song with Beyoncé over the phone, adding: "She was out of the country at that point, but she had the 'Bootylicious' concept in her head. That was totally her. She knew what she wanted to say. It was very urban pop angle that they were taking on the record." Once the group decided to record "Bootylicious", Fusari wanted to remove the sample, explaining: "I figured I'd put the guitar loop on there temporarily, and later go into the studio with a guitar and replay it, because I'd learned, after sampling Stevie Wonder's "I Wish" for Will Smith's "Wild Wild West," that I didn't want to lose 50% of the publishing. I vividly remember telling Mathew Knowles, "Mathew, you got to book me into your studio and let me replay that riff." It was Guitar 101! One note!"; however, Knowles refused. Dan Workman, who engineered several tracks from Survivor, commented on the recording sessions: "Beyoncé would be driving over to the studio listening to all these tracks that had been sent to her, and she would pick out her favorite. When she got here, she would immediately start writing lyrics for the song and finish it right there in front of me. For the song "Bootylicious" she wrote all the lyrics for it right in [SugarHill Recording Studios'] Studio A. Then she taught the song to Kelly and Michelle, and all three of them worked on the vocals together."

D'wayne Wiggins, who wrote "Fancy" with Beyoncé and J. R. Rotem, said Destiny's Child would carefully select lyrics for the songs, adjusting them to suit the group. According to Wiggins, they would "just take a song and dissect it and put it back together again. For "Fancy," it took [only] about 30 or 45 minutes to change the hook." Rotem reflected on the song's simple instrumentation, revealing he created beats solely using a keyboard and a drum machine. The song was recorded at the Digital Services in Houston, with additional recording at the House of Music in Oakland, California. Mark J. Feist, who produced "Emotion", changed the arrangement and production of Samantha Sang's disco-soul 1977 original version into a contemporary ballad. Beyoncé would re-record "Dangerously in Love" with a modified arrangement for her 2003 debut solo studio album of the same title. Both versions were recorded at the SugarHill Recording Studios, and were written and produced by Beyoncé and Errol McCalla Jr. As Survivor neared its completion in December 2000, Destiny's Child referred to their hectic schedule while recording the album, revealing they took time off recording solely on Christmas Day. While they intended to complete the album soon afterwards, the recording continued into early 2001, causing the album's release date to be postponed and its lead single "Survivor" to be delayed from January to March. During the album's production, Rowland recorded her debut solo recording "Angel". Produced by Beyoncé, Fusari and Falonte Moore–who wrote and produced "Bootylicious", "Apple Pie à la Mode" and "Happy Face"–the track appeared on the accompanying soundtrack for the 2001 film Down to Earth. Previous collaborator Rodney Jerkins, whose production "Say My Name" became one of Destiny's Child's biggest hits, had also returned to work on Survivor. He produced two tracks, including the "street-edgy", up-tempo "Girl Like Me", but neither made the final track listing.

== Music and lyrics ==
Survivor is predominantly an R&B and pop record exploring genres such as hip hop, funk and dance. Its lyrical themes include dynamics between women, self-esteem, independence and romantic relationships. The album opens with the uptempo club track "Independent Women Part I", which encourages female empowerment and financial independence. As it was recorded for the accompanying soundtrack for Charlie's Angels (2000), it makes numerous lyrical references to the film. The album's title track features looped strings built around an "abrasive" hip hop instrumental. Lyrically, it's considered a "prolonged and rather vindictive attack" on the former members of Destiny's Child–LeToya Luckett, LaTavia Roberson and Farrah Franklin. The "blinding Prince-like R&B-jazz odyssey" "Bootylicious" features a lyrical response to those who had criticized Beyoncé's weight gain, against a prominent guitar riff sample from Stevie Nicks' 1981 song "Edge of Seventeen". "Nasty Girl" features the group "hurling insults at a hip-hop harlot", while dismissing "classless" women altogether. It features an uncredited interpolation of Salt-N-Pepa's 1986 song "Push It". Pizzicato string-driven "Fancy" is seen as another diss track directed towards the group's former members.

Avant-funk track "Apple Pie à la Mode" features "percolating" beats and harmonies, while the dance track "Sexy Daddy" is infused with discordant harmonies and "thundering" ragga beats. "Independent Women Part II" sonically differs from its counterpart, featuring modified lyrics against a cartoonish bounce background. The "sunny day" pop track "Happy Face" promotes self-esteem; Sylvia Patterson from NME classified its genre as "cajun-R&B-yodel-pop". A string of ballads subsequently appears, including a "slow jam" cover version of Samantha Sang's 1977 song "Emotion", as well as the "soft" "Dangerously in Love" and the easy listening love song "Brown Eyes". Brian Hiatt from MTV described the latter as "a gently harmonized love song, with production reminiscent of the Janet Jackson hit "Again."" "The Story of Beauty" lyrically differs from the rest of Survivor, telling a story about a victim of sexual abuse; it was based on a fan who wrote a letter to the group. Beyoncé described it as "a pretty controversial yet realistic song that deals with something that happens in most families that no one wants to talk about." A cappella gospel track "Gospel Medley" comprises the Beyoncé-written "You've Been So Good", Kirk Franklin's "Now Behold the Lamb", the Christian hymn "Jesus Loves Me", and Richard Smallwood's "Total Praise". The album closes with "Outro (DC-3) Thank You", on which the members congratulate, praise and thank each other.

== Marketing and touring ==
Survivor was originally slated for February 13, 2001, before being postponed to April, and afterwards to its ultimate release date of May 1. Its promotional activities commenced on February 28, when Destiny's Child performed the lead single "Survivor" for the first time at the 2001 Soul Train Music Awards. The song was subsequently performed on the April 6 episode of Top of the Pops in the United Kingdom, with "Emotion" on Saturday Night Live on May 5, on Late Show with David Letterman on May 10, and with "Bootylicious" on Today on May 11. The group additionally performed the album's first three singles "Survivor", "Bootylicious" and "Emotion" on The Early Show on June 6. They subsequently opened the inaugural BET Awards with "Bootylicious" on June 19, later performing the song on the August 3 episode of Top of the Pops and the September 7 Michael Jackson: 30th Anniversary Celebration show. In the meantime, the group had embarked on the co-headlining Total Request Live Tour with 3LW, Dream, Eve and Nelly with the St. Lunatics, which ran throughout North America from July 18 until September 21. Afterwards, their own European tour was scheduled to run from October 24 to November 20, but was postponed in the wake of the September 11 attacks.

Following the tour's postponement, Destiny's Child performed "Survivor", "Emotion" and "Gospel Medley" during the benefit concert United We Stand: What More Can I Give, led by Michael Jackson in tribute to victims of the September 11 attacks, on October 21. Within subsequent months, the group focused on the overseas promotion of Survivor, performing "Emotion" on the November 23 episode of Top of the Pops in the UK and the December 15 episode of Wetten, dass..? in Germany, "Survivor" during the Sanremo Music Festival 2002 in Italy on March 8, and "Bootylicious" at the Logie Awards of 2002 in Australia on April 28. Also, their first remix album, titled This Is the Remix, was released on March 12 and included remixes of several tracks from Survivor among other tracks; it debuted at number 29 on the US Billboard 200. The postponed Destiny's Child World Tour commenced on April 29, being expanded from solely Europe to Oceania and Japan as well, and finished on June 24. Its Rotterdam show was filmed and released via video album Destiny's Child World Tour on July 8, 2003.

=== Title and packaging ===
Originally titled Independent Women after "Independent Women Part I", the album was later retitled Survivors, as Destiny's Child branded themselves "survivors" in reference to the turmoil that had coincided with the group throughout 2000. The title was later altered to Survivor. Beyoncé further explained: "I thought about this joke that this radio station had, and they were saying, 'Oh, Destiny's Child is like "Survivor," trying to see which member is going to last the longest on the island,' and everyone laughed. I was like, 'Ah, that's cute, but you know what? I'm going to use that negative thing and turn it into a positive thing and try to write a great song out of it.'"

The cover artwork for Survivor was photographed by Rod Spicer, with the group styled by Beyoncé's mother Tina Knowles. Biographer Daryl Easlea noted the cover "showing the group now as women rather than the girls of the previous sleeves". The album's booklet included a photograph of the members looking "triumphal" standing on rocks on a desert island, inspired by the reality television series Survivor, as a reference to the album's title and title track.

=== Singles ===
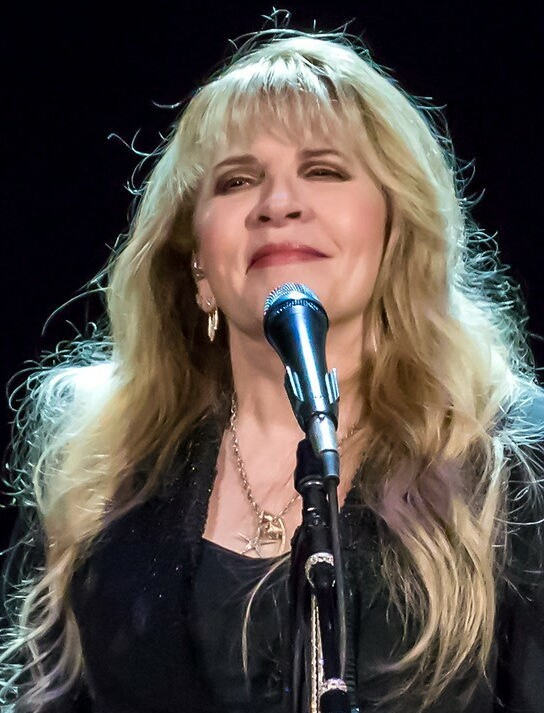
The guitar riff from "Edge of Seventeen" by Stevie Nicks (pictured) was sampled on "Bootylicious". Nicks would later appear in the song's accompanying music video, playing the sampled riff.

"Survivor" was released as the lead single from Survivor on March 6, 2001, to mixed critical reception. A commercial success, it became Destiny's Child's fourth consecutive US Billboard Hot 100 top-three single, peaking at number two. The digital single was certified platinum by the Recording Industry Association of America (RIAA) in July 2020. Internationally, the song reached the summit in Ireland, Norway and the United Kingdom, and the top ten in 15 additional countries. Despite a mixed critical response, it won Best R&B Performance by a Duo or Group with Vocals at the 44th Annual Grammy Awards (2002), marking Destiny's Child's third and final Grammy Award win as a group. Its Darren Grant-directed accompanying music video depicts the members as shipwreck survivors on a desert island. The video was released as the group's first DVD single, which peaked at number nine on the US Top Music Videos and was certified gold by the RIAA. At the 2001 MTV Video Music Awards, the video won Best R&B Video, also being nominated for Best Pop Video and Best Group Video.

"Bootylicious" was released as the second single from Survivor on May 22, 2001. Commercially, it fared similarly to its predecessor, becoming Destiny's Child's fourth and final US Billboard Hot 100 number-one single. The digital single was certified platinum by the RIAA in July 2020. Internationally, the song reached the top ten in Australia, Belgium, Canada, Ireland, the Netherlands, New Zealand, Norway, Sweden and the UK. Its Matthew Rolston-directed accompanying music video showcases the group performing numerous of Michael Jackson's choreographies and features Stevie Nicks playing the guitar riff sampled from her song "Edge of Seventeen".

"Emotion" was released as the third single from Survivor on September 4, 2001. A commercial success, it continued Destiny's Child's streak of US Billboard Hot 100 top-ten singles by peaking at number ten after being fueled by post-September 11 attacks airplay. Internationally, it peaked within the top ten in Hungary, Ireland, the Netherlands, New Zealand, Norway, Portugal, South Africa and the UK. Its Francis Lawrence-directed accompanying music video features the members' respective situations through a triple-split screen; Beyoncé deals with an adulterous boyfriend, Kelly Rowland deals with separation from her boyfriend, while Michelle Williams deals with the death of her grandmother.

"Nasty Girl" was released as the fourth and final single from Survivor outside North America on March 4, 2002, to negative critical reception. A moderate commercial success, it peaked at number ten in Australia and within the top 40 in Belgium, Denmark, Germany, Ireland, the Netherlands, Sweden and Switzerland. Its Sanaa Hamri-directed accompanying music video depicts women perceived as "nasty girls" receiving transformations. In 2016, Rob Fusari, who produced several tracks from Survivor, revealed "Happy Face" was originally slated as the album's final single, but those plans were scrapped due to the song's lyrical content being deemed inappropriate in the wake of the September 11 attacks.

== Critical reception ==
Professional ratings
Aggregate scores
Source	Rating
Metacritic	63/100
Review scores
Source	Rating
AllMusic	3/5 stars
Blender	4/5 stars
Entertainment Weekly	B+
The Guardian	4/5 stars
Los Angeles Times	2/4 stars
NME	7/10
Q	3/5 stars
Rolling Stone	3.5/5 stars
Spin	9/10
Vibe	3/5 stars

Survivor received generally favorable reviews from music critics upon its release. At Metacritic, which assigns a normalized rating out of 100 to reviews from mainstream critics, the album received an average score of 63 out of 100, based on 17 reviews, indicating "generally favorable reviews". Writing for Entertainment Weekly, David Browne praised the record, calling it "the divas' premature, but inevitable growing pains album." Spin commented that "Survivor is relentlessly inventive in its recombinations." Ethan Brown from New York was less impressed, writing: "All fifteen tracks are one-dimensional disses and dismissals of scantily clad women, vengeful boyfriends, and the group's assorted doubters." Sylvia Patterson from NME summarized the album as "Multi-platinum booty-shakers in boundary-pushing nil-shit-taking exercise", while highlighting "Independent Women Part I". Natalie Nichols from Los Angeles Times described it as a "generic hip-hop music box of ticking percussion, pulsing bass and uninspiring samples [which] barely allows [Destiny's Child] a moment to breathe, let alone stretch out".

Despite criticizing its length, lyrical content and balladry, Alexis Petridis from The Guardian wrote that Survivor "has a rare individuality, and a hint of genius, hidden in its grooves". Nathan Rabin from The A.V. Club shared Petridis' negative sentiments, concluding his review by saying: "if the group wants to survive the stormy seas of the pop world for more than a few years, it should call its stable of songwriting wizards ASAP". In a positive review, Cristín Leach from RTÉ highlighted "The Story of Beauty" while dismissing the album's closing tracks "Gospel Medley" and "Outro (DC-3) Thank You". Laura Sinagra from Blender wrote: "Aside from disposable ballads and the sappy "Perfect Man," Survivor blasts haters, child molesters and "been-around-the-block-females," keeping the blood up as they whup ass." Sal Cinquemani from Slant Magazine expressed that "for the most part Survivor rises to the occasion, and while the album isn't groundbreaking, it at least shows the new trio breaking out on their own." Rob Sheffield from Rolling Stone praised the album but singled "the self-righteous tone creeping into the songs" out as its sole weakness.

== Accolades ==
=== Awards ===
Awards and nominations
Year	Award	Category	Nominee(s)	Result	Ref.
2001	Teen Choice Award	Choice Music – Album	Survivor	Nominated	
2002	American Music Award	Favorite Pop/Rock Album	Survivor	Won	
2002	Grammy Award	Best R&B Album	Survivor	Nominated	
2002	Soul Train Music Award	Best R&B/Soul Album – Group, Band or Duo	Survivor	Nominated	
2002	TMF Award	Best Album	Survivor	Won	
2002	Soul Train Lady of Soul Award	Best R&B/Soul Album by a Group, Band or Duo	Survivor	Won	

=== Listings ===
Listings
Year	Publication	List	Position	Ref.
2001	Aftonbladet	Albums of the Year	15	
2001	Blender	Albums of the Year	9	
2001	The Face	Recordings of the Year	18	
2001	Musikexpress	Albums of the Year	15	
2001	NME	Albums of 2001	15	
2001	OOR	Jaarlijst 2001	41	
2001	Playlouder	Best Albums of 2001	46	
2007	The Guardian	1000 Albums to Hear Before You Die	–	
2009	Adresseavisen	Top 100 Albums of the 2000s	98	
2009	The Guardian	OMM's Top 50 Albums of the Decade	49	
2010	1001 Albums You Must Hear Before You Die		–	
2023	Rolling Stone (Germany)	The 500 Greatest Albums of All Time	384	

== Commercial performance ==
In the United States, Survivor debuted atop the Billboard 200 chart dated May 19, 2001, with first-week sales of 663,000 copies. It also debuted atop the Top R&B/Hip-Hop Albums, selling over 87,000 copies at the R&B core stores within its first week. Destiny's Child's first number-one album on both charts, it registered the highest first-week sales for any Columbia Records artist at the time. Despite a 46% sales decline to 358,979 units, the album remained at the summit in its second week, reaching the one-million sales mark. In its third week, the album descended to number three, selling 221,884 copies; in total, it spent 14 consecutive weeks within the top ten. By the end of 2001, Survivor had sold over 3.7 million copies, becoming the seventh best-selling album of the year. It was certified quadruple platinum by the Recording Industry Association of America (RIAA) on January 7, 2002. By November 2005, the album had sold over 4.7 million units in the US, being one of the best-selling girl group albums ever in the country. (Note: According to Nielsen SoundScan, Survivor had sold 4,300,000 copies in the United States by November 2005. Nielsen SoundScan did not count sales through music clubs such as BMG Music Service, through which the album sold 439,000 additional units by February 2003, bringing its sales total to 4,739,000 units.) In Canada, the album debuted atop the Canadian Albums Chart, spending four weeks at the summit. In October 2003, it was certified quadruple platinum by Music Canada.

Across Europe, Survivor reached the summit in Austria, Belgium, Germany, Greece, Iceland, Ireland, the Netherlands, Norway and Switzerland. On the European Top 100 Albums, it debuted at number 49 and peaked atop the chart the following week. In 2001, the record was certified double platinum by the International Federation of the Phonographic Industry (IFPI) for sales of two million units across Europe. In the United Kingdom, the album debuted atop the UK Albums Chart, UK R&B Albums Chart and Scottish Albums Chart, with first-week sales of 118,000 copies. It became the first studio album by an American girl group to peak atop the UK Albums Chart and made Destiny's Child the second American girl group in history to reach the summit, following The Supremes, who did so with their greatest hits albums Greatest Hits (1967) and 20 Golden Greats (1977). British Phonographic Industry (BPI) certified it triple platinum in December 2001.

In Australia, Survivor debuted and peaked at number four on the ARIA Top 100 Albums, and was certified double platinum by the Australian Recording Industry Association (ARIA) in December 2001. In New Zealand, it debuted at number ten, ascending towards its peak at number five in its second week. The album was certified double platinum by the Recording Industry Association of New Zealand (RIANZ) in 2002. In Japan, it peaked at number 12 on the Oricon Albums Chart, being certified platinum by the Recording Industry Association of Japan (RIAJ) in May 2001. In South Africa, the album reached number one and, in 2002, was certified triple platinum by the Recording Industry of South Africa (RISA). According to IFPI, Survivor was the third best-selling album worldwide of 2001, with 7.8 million copies sold during the year. By November 2004, Survivor had sold over ten million copies worldwide, being the fifth best-selling girl group album of all time.

== Controversy ==
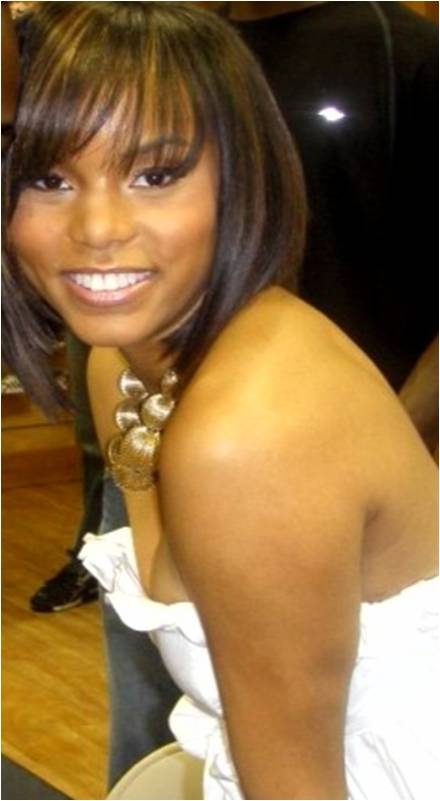
LeToya Luckett (pictured) and LaTavia Roberson filed their second lawsuit against Destiny's Child in response to the lyrical content of "Survivor", which they perceived as a violation of a prior agreement.

Survivor was the subject of several controversies, albeit less than its predecessor The Writing's on the Wall (1999). Rob Fusari, who wrote "Bootylicious", recalled a dispute with Destiny's Child's manager and Beyoncé's father Mathew Knowles over the song's conception. In an interview with Barbara Walters, Beyoncé had discussed how she came up with the idea for the song herself. Upon seeing that, Fusari called Knowles, describing the conversation:

And he explained to me, in a nice way, he said, "People don't want to hear about Rob Fusari, producer from Livingston, N.J. No offense, but that's not what sells records. What sells records is people believing that the artist is everything." And I'm like, "Yeah, I know, Mathew. I understand the game. But come on, I'm trying too. I'm a squirrel trying to get a nut, too."

The lyrical content of "Survivor" caused backlash from LeToya Luckett and LaTavia Roberson, who had controversially departed from the group in February 2000 and filed a lawsuit against the group and their management soon afterwards. The portion of the lawsuit directed towards Beyoncé and Kelly Rowland had been dropped by the end of the year, with a mutual agreement prohibiting either party involved from making "any public comment of a disparaging nature concerning one another". Luckett and Roberson contended the line "You thought I wouldn't sell without you, sold 9 million" violated the agreement and filed another lawsuit against the group in February 2002, accusing Beyoncé, Rowland and Michelle Williams of making "deliberate disparaging, defamatory factual misrepresentations" in the song, as well as in their statements for the press surrounding the release of Survivor. By late July, the parties had reached a settlement out of court.

== Legacy ==
Retrospectively, Survivor has received mixed to positive critical commentary, with criticism directed towards its lyrical content, and praise towards its thematic impact on mainstream music of the 2000s. Stephen Thomas Erlewine wrote for AllMusic: "Survivor, their first album as full-fledged superstars – also their first album since most of the group disappeared due to managerial conflicts – is as contrived and calculated as a Mariah Carey record, only without the joy. This is a determined, bullheaded record, intent on proving Destiny's Child has artistic merit largely because the group survived internal strife." On the contrary, J'na Jefferson from Vibe declared the album "a seminal force in the female empowerment trend of the 21st century, serving as a love letter to body-positive, independent and fierce women all over the globe." Furthermore, Vincent Anthony from The 97 credited the record for "unbiasedly [melding] R&B inspirations and hip-hop nuances into an [sic] unique brand of pop that defined the early 2000s".

From a standpoint concerning pop culture, Nathan Brackett and Christian Hoard wrote that the album "helped establish [Destiny's Child] as an American institution" in The New Rolling Stone Album Guide (2004). Its second single "Bootylicious" popularized the portmanteau term "bootylicious", a combination of the words "booty" and "delicious", although the term had already been used by Snoop Dogg on Dr. Dre's 1992 song "Fuck wit Dre Day (And Everybody's Celebratin')" as a pejorative. As Destiny's Child brought the term's neologism of approval to prominence, it consequently entered the mainstream English language, thus being added to the Oxford English Dictionary in 2004, referring to a sexually attractive woman in its definition. Following the September 11 attacks, the lead single "Survivor" received new lyrical interpretations from the public, being called a "tool for national grief in a way to show solidarity and strength". "Emotion", which was released as the third single around the time of the attacks, was also branded a "healing song", which contributed to its commercial success in the United States.

As previously announced, following the completion of promotional duties for Survivor, Destiny's Child embarked on a hiatus in 2002, in order for its members to release solo albums. (Note: Destiny's Child would reunite in 2004 to release their fifth and final studio album Destiny Fulfilled, before disbanding in 2006.) Michelle Williams was first to release a solo album, titled Heart to Yours, in April 2002. It features the "Gospel Medley" first released on Survivor. The critically acclaimed gospel record debuted at number 57 on the US Billboard 200, with first-week sales of 17,000 copies and later peaked at number-one on the Top Gospel Albums chart. It became the biggest-selling gospel album of the year, with 220,000 copies sold in the US. At the 2002 MOBO Awards, Wiliams won an award for "Best Gospel Act", before making her Broadway debut, as the lead in the musical Aida in November 2003. Although Beyoncé Knowles' solo album was initially scheduled for October 2002, its release was postponed due to the success of Kelly Rowland's collaboration with Nelly, "Dilemma". The song reached the summit of the US Billboard Hot 100, thus Rowland's pop rock-oriented solo debut Simply Deep was moved up to October from its original early 2003 release date. Simply Deep debuted at number 12 on the US Billboard 200, selling 77,000 units within its first week and going on to be certified gold by the Recording Industry Association of America (RIAA). "Dilemma" additionally won Rowland her first Grammy Award outside the group, for Best Rap/Sung Collaboration at the 45th Annual Grammy Awards (2003).

Following numerous postponements, Beyoncé was the last to release a solo album. Titled Dangerously in Love, it was released in June 2003 to widespread critical acclaim. The album debuted atop the US Billboard 200 and registered the highest first-week sales among the members with 317,000 units. It was preceded by the lead single "Crazy in Love", which spent eight consecutive weeks atop the US Billboard Hot 100. "Crazy in Love" was followed by "Baby Boy", which surpassed its predecessor's reign at the summit by one week, and the top-five hits "Me, Myself and I" and "Naughty Girl". At the 46th Annual Grammy Awards (2004), Dangerously in Love and its tracks won five awards, including Best Contemporary R&B Album; Beyoncé consequently tied with Lauryn Hill, Alicia Keys and Norah Jones for the record of most Grammy Awards won by a woman at a single ceremony. (Note: Beyoncé would break her own record at the 52nd Annual Grammy Awards (2010), when she won six awards.) Following the release of her sixth solo studio album Lemonade (2016), Sasha Geffen from MTV claimed "Survivor marked [Beyoncé]'s turning point from musician to global phenomenon", drawing parallels between lyrical themes of tracks from Survivor and those from Lemonade.

== Track listing ==
Survivor
No.	Title	Writer(s)	Producer(s)	Length
1.	"Independent Women Part I"	Beyoncé Knowles; Samuel Barnes; Cory Rooney; Jean-Claude Olivier	B. Knowles; Poke and Tone; Rooney	3:42
2.	"Survivor" (includes "Bootylicious" prelude)	B. Knowles; Anthony Dent; Mathew Knowles	B. Knowles; Dent	4:14
3.	"Bootylicious"	B. Knowles; Rob Fusari; Falonte Moore; Stevie Nicks	B. Knowles; Fusari; Moore	3:28
4.	"Nasty Girl"	B. Knowles; Dent; Maurizio Bassi; Naimy Hackett	B. Knowles; Dent	4:18
5.	"Fancy"	B. Knowles; Dwayne Wiggins; J. R. Rotem	Rotem; B. Knowles; Wiggins	4:13
6.	"Apple Pie à la Mode"	B. Knowles; Fusari; Moore	B. Knowles; Fusari; Moore	2:59
7.	"Sexy Daddy"	B. Knowles; Damon Elliott	B. Knowles; Elliott	4:07
8.	"Independent Women Part II"	B. Knowles; Rapture Stewart; Eric Seats; Frank Comstock; David Donaldson	B. Knowles; Stewart; Seats	3:46
9.	"Happy Face" (includes "Emotion" prelude)	B. Knowles; Fusari; Moore; Calvin Gaines; Bill Lee	B. Knowles; Fusari; Gaines^{[a]}; Lee^{[a]}; Moore^{[a]}	4:32
10.	"Emotion"	Barry Gibb; Robin Gibb	B. Knowles; Mark Feist; M. Knowles^{[a]}	3:56
11.	"Dangerously in Love"	B. Knowles; Errol McCalla Jr.	B. Knowles; McCalla	4:53
12.	"Brown Eyes" (includes "The Story of Beauty" prelude)	B. Knowles; Walter Afanasieff	B. Knowles^{[a]}; Afanasieff	4:47
13.	"The Story of Beauty"	B. Knowles; Ken Fambro	B. Knowles; Fambro	3:32
14.	"Gospel Medley" (Dedicated to Andretta Tillman)	B. Knowles; Kirk Franklin; Richard Smallwood	B. Knowles	3:25
15.	"Outro (DC-3) Thank You"	B. Knowles; Kelly Rowland; Michelle Williams; Fusari; Gaines; Lee	B. Knowles; Fusari; Gaines^{[a]}; Lee^{[a]}	4:03
Total length:				59:37

International edition
No.	Title	Writer(s)	Producer(s)	Length
8.	"Perfect Man"	B. Knowles; Rapture Stewart; Eric Seats	B. Knowles^{[b]}; Stewart; Seats	3:46
9.	"Independent Women Part II"	B. Knowles; Stewart; Seats; Comstock; David Donaldson	B. Knowles; Stewart; Seats	3:46
10.	"Happy Face"	B. Knowles; Fusari; Moore; Gaines; Lee	B. Knowles; Fusari; Gaines^{[a]}; Lee^{[a]}; Moore^{[a]}	4:32
11.	"Dance with Me"	B. Knowles; Soulshock; Kenneth Karlin	B. Knowles; Soulshock & Karlin	3:43
12.	"My Heart Still Beats" (featuring Beyoncé) (includes "Emotion" prelude)	B. Knowles; Afanasieff	B. Knowles^{[a]}; Afanasieff	4:08
13.	"Emotion"	B. Gibb; R. Gibb	B. Knowles; Feist; M. Knowles^{[a]}	3:56
14.	"Brown Eyes"	B. Knowles; Afanasieff	B. Knowles^{[a]}; Afanasieff	4:36
15.	"Dangerously in Love" (includes "The Story of Beauty" prelude)	B. Knowles; McCalla Jr.	B. Knowles; McCalla	4:53
16.	"The Story of Beauty"	B. Knowles; Ken Fambro	B. Knowles; Fambro	3:32
17.	"Gospel Medley" (Dedicated to Andretta Tillman)	B. Knowles; Franklin; Smallwood	B. Knowles	3:25
18.	"Outro (DC-3) Thank You"	B. Knowles; Rowland; Williams; Fusari; Gaines; Lee	B. Knowles; Fusari; Gaines^{[a]}; Lee^{[a]}	4:03

=== Notes ===
- ^{^a} signifies a co-producer
- ^{^b} signifies a vocal producer
- ^{^c} signifies an additional producer
- "Gospel Medley" comprises "You've Been So Good", "Now Behold the Lamb", "Jesus Loves Me" and "Total Praise".
- Japanese edition pressings include Maurice Joshua's radio mix of "Survivor".
- North American enhanced CD pressings include the video for the Brit Awards 2001 live performance of "Independent Women Part I".
- International enhanced CD and North American Super Audio CD pressings include the music video for "Survivor".
- Super Audio CD pressings include The Neptunes' remix of "Emotion".

Sample credits

- "Bootylicious" contains samples from "Edge of Seventeen" by Stevie Nicks.
- "Nasty Girl" contains replayed elements from "Tarzan Boy" by Baltimora and uncredited interpolations from "Push It" by Salt-N-Pepa.
- "Independent Women Part II" contains samples from "Peabody's Improbable History" by Frank Comstock.

== Personnel ==
Credits are adapted from the liner notes of Survivor.

- Walter Afanasieff – arrangement (tracks 12 and 14), bass (tracks 12 and 14), drum programming (tracks 12 and 14), production (tracks 12 and 14), rhythm programming (tracks 12 and 14), songwriting (tracks 12 and 14)
- Billy B. – make-up
- Rich Balmer – engineering assistance (track 2)
- Maurizio Bassi – songwriting (track 4)
- Kerren Berz – live strings (track 2)
- Greg Bieck – additional keyboards (tracks 12 and 14), drum programming (tracks 12 and 14), engineering (tracks 12 and 14), Macintosh/digital programming (tracks 12 and 14), rhythm programming (tracks 12 and 14)
- John "Jab" Broussard – additional guitars (track 15)
- Orlando Calzada – engineering (tracks 2 and 4)
- Jim Caruana – engineering (track 18)
- Frank Comstock – songwriting (track 9)
- Robert Conley – additional programming (tracks 12 and 14)
- Michael Conrader – engineering (tracks 8 and 9), mixing (track 9)
- Tom Coyne – mastering (all tracks)
- Rich Davis – production coordination (track 14)
- Anthony Dent – engineering (track 2), production (tracks 2 and 4), songwriting (tracks 2 and 4)
- David Donaldson – additional keyboards (track 9), songwriting (track 9), vocal engineering (track 9)
- Damon Elliott – additional engineering (track 7), production (track 7), songwriting (track 7)
- Greg Edenfield – 2nd engineer (track 11)
- Ken "K-Fam" Fambro – production (track 16), songwriting (track 16)
- Mark Feist – production (track 13)
- Farrah Franklin – backing vocals (tracks 1 and 9)
- Kirk Franklin – songwriting (track 17)
- Rob Fusari – production (tracks 3, 6, 10 and 18), songwriting (tracks 3, 6, 10 and 18)
- Calvin Gaines – production (tracks 10 and 18), songwriting (tracks 10 and 18)
- Barry Gibb – songwriting (track 13)
- Robin Gibb – songwriting (track 13)
- David Gleeson – engineering (track 14)
- Troy Gonzalez – additional engineering (track 1)
- Andy Gwynn – mixing assistance (track 2)
- Naimy Hackett – songwriting (track 4)
- James Hoover – engineering (tracks 5–7), vocal engineering (tracks 4 and 10)
- Kent Huffnagle – additional engineering (track 6)
- I.C. – art direction
- Kenneth Karlin – instrumentation (track 11), production (track 11), songwriting (track 11)
- Beyoncé Knowles – arrangement (track 17), backing vocals (all tracks), lead vocals (all tracks), production (tracks 1–7 and 9–18), songwriting (tracks 1–12 and 14–18), vocal arrangement (track 13), vocal production (track 8)
- Mathew Knowles – executive production, production (track 13), songwriting (track 2)
- Tina Knowles – hair, styling
- Pete Krawiec – engineering assistance (tracks 12 and 14)
- Bill Lee – production (tracks 10 and 18), songwriting (tracks 10 and 18)
- William Malina – engineering (track 11)
- Manny Marroquin – mixing (track 11)
- Tony Maserati – mixing (tracks 2–6, 10 and 18), mixing engineering (track 9)
- Errol "Poppi" McCalla Jr. – additional programming (track 13), production (track 15), songwriting (track 15)
- Michael McCoy – engineering assistance (tracks 12 and 14)
- Falonte Moore – production (tracks 3, 6 and 10), songwriting (tracks 3, 6 and 10)
- Ramon Morales – additional engineering (track 1)
- Stevie Nicks – songwriting (track 3)
- Flip Osman – mixing assistance (tracks 2–6, 10 and 18)
- Dave "Hard Drive" Pensado – mixing (tracks 7, 13, 16 and 17)
- Poke and Tone – production (track 1), songwriting (track 1)
- Redd – keyboards (track 2)
- Cory Rooney – production (track 1), songwriting (track 1)
- J. R. Rotem – additional instrumentation (track 5), songwriting (track 5)
- Kelly Rowland – backing vocals (tracks 1–11 and 13–18), lead vocals (tracks 1–7, 10, 13 and 16–18), songwriting (track 18)
- Eric Seats – instrumentation (track 9), mixing (track 9), production (tracks 8 and 9), songwriting (tracks 8 and 9)
- Nunzil Signore – guitars (track 10)
- Dexter Simmons – mixing (track 15)
- Richard Smallwood – songwriting (track 17)
- Manelich Sotolongo – engineering (track 1)
- Soulshock – instrumentation (track 11), mixing (track 11), production (track 11), songwriting (track 11)
- Spicer – photography
- Brian Springer – engineering (track 13), vocal engineering (tracks 15 and 16)
- Rapture Stewart – instrumentation (track 9), mixing (track 9), production (tracks 8 and 9), songwriting (tracks 8 and 9)
- Terry-T – additional engineering (track 5)
- Jill Topol – styling
- Rich Travali – mixing (track 1)
- Dave Way – mixing (tracks 12 and 14)
- Marla Weinhoff – prop styling
- Teresa LaBarbera Whites – A&R
- Dwayne Wiggins – guitars (track 5), production (track 5), songwriting (track 5)
- Michelle Williams – backing vocals (tracks 1–7, 9–11 and 13–18), lead vocals (tracks 2–5, 7, 10, 13 and 18), songwriting (track 18)
- Kim Woods Sandusky – vocal consultation
- Dan Workman – additional engineering (track 13), additional mixing (track 2), engineering (tracks 15 and 17), guitars (track 15), vocal engineering (track 3)
- Wassin Zreik – engineering assistance (track 7)

== Charts ==
=== Weekly charts ===
2001 weekly chart performance
Chart	Peak position
Australian Albums (ARIA)	4
Australian Urban Albums (ARIA)	2
Austrian Albums (Ö3 Austria)	1
Belgian Albums (Ultratop Flanders)	1
Belgian Albums (Ultratop Wallonia)	1
Canadian Albums (Billboard)	1
Canadian R&B Albums (Nielsen SoundScan)	1
Danish Albums (Hitlisten)	7
Dutch Albums (Album Top 100)	1
European Top 100 Albums (Music & Media)	1
Finnish Albums (Suomen virallinen lista)	4
French Albums (SNEP)	4
German Albums (Offizielle Top 100)	1
Greek Albums (IFPI)	1
Hungarian Albums (MAHASZ)	2
Icelandic Albums (Tónlist)	3
Irish Albums (IRMA)	1
Italian Albums (FIMI)	9
Japanese Albums (Oricon)	12
New Zealand Albums (RMNZ)	5
Norwegian Albums (VG-lista)	1
Polish Albums (ZPAV)	3
Scottish Albums (Official Charts)	1
Slovak Albums (IFPI)	5
South African Albums (RISA)	1
Spanish Albums (AFYVE)	15
Swedish Albums (Sverigetopplistan)	2
Swiss Albums (Schweizer Hitparade)	1
UK Albums (Official Charts)	1
UK R&B Albums (Official Charts)	1
US Billboard 200	1
US Top R&B/Hip-Hop Albums (Billboard)	1

=== Monthly charts ===
2001 monthly chart performance
Chart	Peak position
South Korean International Albums (RIAK)	8
Uruguayan Albums (CUD)	8

=== Year-end charts ===
2001 year-end chart performance
Chart	Position
Australian Albums (ARIA)	20
Australian Urban Albums (ARIA)	10
Austrian Albums (Ö3 Austria)	52
Belgian Albums (Ultratop Flanders)	13
Belgian Albums (Ultratop Wallonia)	43
Canadian Albums (Nielsen SoundScan)	4
Canadian R&B Albums (Nielsen SoundScan)	2
Danish Albums (Hitlisten)	48
Dutch Albums (Album Top 100)	4
European Top 100 Albums (Music & Media)	8
Finnish Albums (Suomen virallinen lista)	4
French Albums (SNEP)	44
German Albums (Offizielle Top 100)	11
Hungarian Albums (MAHASZ)	11
Irish Albums (IRMA)	5
New Zealand Albums (RMNZ)	14
South Korean International Albums (MIAK)	42
Spanish Albums (AFYVE)	44
Swedish Albums (Sverigetopplistan)	20
Swiss Albums (Schweizer Hitparade)	12
UK Albums (OCC)	9
US Billboard 200	12
US Top R&B/Hip-Hop Albums (Billboard)	16
Worldwide Albums (IFPI)	3

2002 year-end chart performance
Chart	Position
Australian Urban Albums (ARIA)	14
Canadian Albums (Nielsen SoundScan)	196
Canadian R&B Albums (Nielsen SoundScan)	35
US Billboard 200	141

=== Decade-end charts ===
2000s decade-end chart performance
Chart	Position
Dutch Albums (Album Top 100)	93
US Billboard 200	70

=== Centurial charts ===
21st century chart performance
Chart	Position
US Billboard 200	162

=== All-time charts ===
All-time chart performance
Chart	Position
Irish Female Albums (IRMA)	31
US Billboard 200 (Women)	82

== Certifications ==
Certifications and sales
Region	Certification	Certified units/sales
Australia (ARIA)	2× Platinum	140,000^{^}
Austria (IFPI Austria)	Gold	20,000^{*}
Belgium (BRMA)	Platinum	50,000^{*}
Brazil (Pro-Música Brasil)	Gold	50,000^{*}
Canada (Music Canada)	4× Platinum	400,000^{^}
Denmark (IFPI Danmark)	2× Platinum	40,000^{‡}
Finland (Musiikkituottajat)	Platinum	34,121
France (SNEP)	2× Gold	200,000^{*}
Germany (BVMI)	Platinum	300,000^{^}
Japan (RIAJ)	Platinum	215,030
Netherlands (NVPI)	2× Platinum	160,000^{^}
New Zealand (RMNZ)	2× Platinum	30,000^{^}
Norway (IFPI Norway)	3× Platinum	60,000^{‡}
Poland (ZPAV)	Gold	50,000^{*}
South Africa (RISA)	3× Platinum	150,000^{*}
South Korea	—	28,703
Spain (Promusicae)	Gold	50,000^{^}
Sweden (GLF)	Platinum	80,000^{^}
Switzerland (IFPI Switzerland)	Platinum	40,000^{^}
United Kingdom (BPI)	3× Platinum	1,130,983
United States (RIAA)	4× Platinum	4,739,000
Summaries
Europe (IFPI)	2× Platinum	2,000,000^{*}
Worldwide	—	10,000,000
^{*} Sales figures based on certification alone.^{^} Shipments figures based on certification alone.^{‡} Sales+streaming figures based on certification alone.

== Release history ==
Release dates and formats
Region	Date	Format(s)	Label(s)	Ref.
Japan	April 25, 2001	CD	Sony Japan	
France	April 26, 2001	CD	Columbia	
Germany	April 30, 2001	CD; enhanced CD	Sony	
United Kingdom	April 30, 2001	Cassette; CD; MiniDisc	Columbia	
United States	May 1, 2001	Cassette; enhanced CD	Columbia	
South Korea	May 2, 2001	Cassette; CD	Sony	
Australia	May 4, 2001	Enhanced CD	Sony	
United States	June 26, 2001	Vinyl	Columbia	
United States	January 29, 2002	Super Audio CD	Columbia	
France	March 18, 2002	Super Audio CD	Columbia	

== See also ==
- Destiny's Child discography
- List of Billboard 200 number-one albums of 2001
- List of Billboard number-one R&B albums of 2001
- List of number-one albums of 2001 (Canada)
- List of number-one hits of 2001 (Germany)
- List of UK Albums Chart number ones of the 2000s
- List of UK R&B Albums Chart number ones of 2001
- List of best-selling girl group albums
- List of best-selling albums by women
