= Total Praise =

Song by Richard Smallwood with Vision

from the album Adoration: Live in Atlanta
- Released: April 30, 1996
- Genre: Gospel
- Length: 4:59
- Label: Verity; Jive
- Songwriter: Richard Smallwood

"Total Praise" is a song written by Richard Smallwood, first recorded by Richard Smallwood with Vision on the 1996 album, Adoration: Live in Atlanta. It has subsequently become one of his most popular songs.

== Background and composition ==
Smallwood wrote the song, during a time when he was serving as a caregiver to his mother who was experiencing dementia and a family friend who was dying of cancer. Smallwood explained, “I felt left by God, I was trying to write a pity-party song, but God pulled me to do a praise song. God said, ‘I want your praise no matter what the situation you are in, good or bad.’ It’s about trusting him.” The song is based on Psalm 121 ', in which David wrote about relying on God during his most difficult times: “You are the source of my strength/ You are the strength of my life/ I lift my hands in total praise to You.”

== Covers ==
- Destiny's Child covered the ending "Amen" chorus of "Total Praise" on their "Gospel Medley", released on the albums Survivor (2001) and Heart to Yours (2002), the latter being the solo debut of band member Michelle Williams, who suggested the Smallwood composition be included in the medley. In 2002, they recorded a live version at Rotterdam Ahoy in Rotterdam, Netherlands released on the Destiny's Child World Tour DVD (2003).
- Fred Hammond recorded a cover in the song titled "You Are My Life", on the album Speak Those Things POL: Chapter 3 (2002).
- Donnie McClurkin, featuring Richard Smallwood, covered the song on the album Psalms, Hymns & Spiritual Songs (2005).
- Anita Wilson covered the song on the album Sunday Song (2017).
- The Aretha Franklin Celebration Choir, accompanied by Smallwood on piano, covered the song at the funeral of Aretha Franklin in 2018.
- Kanye West's Sunday Service Choir covered the song on the album Jesus Is Born (2019).
- Libera covered the song on the album If (2021).
- Travis Malloy, Darrell Walls and Le'Andria Johnson released a cover of the song in 2023.
- Stevie Wonder covered the song at the memorial service for Dexter Scott King on February 10, 2024.
- Other notable performances include those by Patti LaBelle, Fantasia, Chrisette Michelle, the marching band at Florida A&M University, the Makhelat Ha-Mercaz at the Jewish Choral Festival, the Dublin Gospel Choir, the Richmond Symphony Orchestra and The Kingdom Choir.
- At the 68th Annual Grammy Awards, during the In Memoriam section, the tribute performance to D'Angelo and Roberta Flack concluded with a brief snippet of the "Amen" chorus.

== Charts ==
Chart (2020)	Peak position
US Gospel Digital Song Sales (Billboard)	11

Chart (2026)	Peak position
US Gospel Digital Song Sales (Billboard)	6
