= This Is the Remix (Destiny's Child album) =

Remix album by Destiny's Child
- Released: March 12, 2002
- Recorded: 1997–2001
- Length: 58:40
- Label: Columbia
- Producers: Jovonn Alexander; Buster & Shavoni; Ed Case; Anthony Dent; Jermaine Dupri; Chad Elliott; Missy Elliott; Wyclef Jean; Maurice Joshua; Beyoncé Knowles; Errol "Poppi" McCalla, Jr.; The Neptunes; Rockwilder; Eric Seats; She'kspere; Craig "Azza" Simpkins; Joe Smooth; Rapture Stewart; Timbaland

Destiny's Child chronology
8 Days of Christmas (2001)	This Is the Remix (2002)	Destiny Fulfilled (2004)

This Is the Remix is a remix album by American girl group Destiny's Child. Released in the United States on March 12, 2002 by Columbia Records, the album compiles previously released R&B and dance remixes of songs originally featured on the band's first three studio albums: Destiny's Child (1998), The Writing's on the Wall (1999) and Survivor (2001). The album also includes one new track: "Heard a Word", a solo track performed by member Michelle Williams. The album's title is a reference to a lyric in the first track "No, No, No Part 2".

Upon release, This Is the Remix received generally mixed critical reception. It peaked at number 29 on the Billboard 200 and at number 8 on the New Zealand Albums Chart. In the United Kingdom, the album peaked at number 25 and was certified gold.

== Background ==
This Is the Remix is a compilation of previously released remixes by Destiny's Child. Several songs on the album differ from traditional remixes in that they use alternate, re-recorded vocals. These include: "No, No, No (Part II)", "Bootylicious (Rockwilder Remix), "Bug A Boo" (Refugee Camp Remix), "Emotion (Neptunes Remix)", and "Say My Name (Timbaland Remix)".

The album features three dance remixes by Maurice Joshua: "Bills, Bills, Bills" (Maurice's Xclusive Livegig Mix)", "Nasty Girl (Azza's Nu Soul Mix)", and "So Good (Maurice's Soul Remix)", with the latter having re-recorded vocals. "Bug a Boo (Refugee Camp Remix)" is an edited version of the remix originally included on its single release, removing all references to former members Luckett and Roberson. The remix of "Jumpin' Jumpin'" blends the "So So Def Remix" of the song, featuring original members LeToya Luckett and LaTavia Roberson, with "Maurice's Jumpin Retro Mix", which contains vocals by Michelle Williams and Farrah Franklin.

== Critical reception ==
Professional ratings
Review scores
Source	Rating
AllMusic	4/5 stars
The Encyclopedia of Popular Music	3/5 stars
Entertainment Weekly	C−
MTV Asia	8/10
NME	2.5/5 stars
Slant Magazine	3/5 stars
Yahoo! Music UK	5/10

AllMusic editor William Ruhlmann found that "typically, the word 'remix' is far too modest to describe what such knob twiddlers as The Neptunes, Rockwilder, and Timbaland have undertaken. Retaining only the barest bones of the original recordings, if that, they have built wholly new musical tracks [...] and for the most part the results are all to the good [...] These versions aren't only different; usually, they're better than the originals." Sal Cinquemani from Slant Magazine felt that "the collection showcases the R&B trio’s unwavering ability to produce the most contagious of pop hooks and could very well be a premature greatest hits package [...] but the set doesn’t heat up until halfway through track 10 with a trio of club mixes from Maurice Joshua [...] Scam to get your money? Yes. Good fun? Of course."

Tony Naylor from NME called This Is the Remix "a cynical piece of make weight marketing which [we] would get all indignant about, were it not so drearily, predictably average." He found that "Timbaland's version of "Say My Name" is okay, no more, The Neptunes prove, once again, that they only truly sparkle in tandem with Kelis. Only Rockwilder and a non-freakier Missy Elliot really raise their game, turning out an interstellar version of "Bootylicious." Entertainment Weekly's Craig Seymou wrote that "this hits set largely featuring previously released mixes by Missy Elliott, The Neptunes, house guru Maurice Joshua, and others, is too much, too late. These played-to-death cuts are more suited to retirement than reconsideration."

== Commercial performance ==
The band's third full-length release in less than twelve month, This Is the Remix debuted at number 29 on the US Billboard 200 in the week of March 20, 2002, selling 38,000 copies in its first week of release. By November 2004, the album had sold 249,000 units in the US, according to Nielsen Soundscan.

== Track listing ==
Standard edition
No.	Title	Writer(s)	Producer(s)	Length
1.	"No, No, No Part 2" (Extended Version) (featuring Wyclef Jean)	Vincent Herbert; Rob Fusari; Mary Brown; Calvin Gaines	Jean; Jerry Duplessis^{[a]}; Che Greene^{[a]}	4:03
2.	"Emotion" (The Neptunes Remix)	Barry Gibb; Robin Gibb	The Neptunes; Beyoncé Knowles^{[b]}	4:15
3.	"Bootylicious" (Rockwilder Remix) (featuring Missy Elliott)	Rob Fusari; B. Knowles; Falonte Moore; M. Elliott	Rockwilder; M. Elliott; B. Knowles	4:12
4.	"Say My Name" (Timbaland Remix) (featuring Static Major)	LaShawn Daniels; Rodney Jerkins; Fred Jerkins III; B. Knowles; LeToya Luckett; LaTavia Roberson; Kelly Rowland; Timothy Mosley; Stephen Garrett	Timbaland	5:01
5.	"Bug a Boo" (Refugee Camp Remix) (featuring Wyclef Jean)	Kevin "She'kspere" Briggs; Kandi Burruss; B. Knowles; Luckett; Roberson; Rowland; Lawrence Parker	Briggs; Jerry Duplessis^{[c]}; Jean^{[c]}	3:48
6.	"Dot" (The E-Poppi Mix)	Errol "Poppi" McCalla, Jr.; B. Knowles	McCalla; B. Knowles	3:58
7.	"Survivor" (Remix Extended Version) (featuring Da Brat)	Anthony Dent; B. Knowles; Mathew Knowles	Dent; B. Knowles	3:24
8.	"Independent Women Part II"	B. Knowles; Rapture Stewart; Eric Seats; Frank Comstock; David Donaldson	B. Knowles; Stewart; Seats	3:42
9.	"Nasty Girl" (Azza's Nu Soul Remix)	B. Knowles; Dent; Maurizio Bassi; Naimy Hackett	Craig "Azza" Simpkins	5:17
10.	"Jumpin', Jumpin'" (Remix Extended Version) (featuring Da Brat, Jermaine Dupri & Lil' Bow Wow)	B. Knowles; Chad Elliot; Rufus Moore; Dupri; Shawntae Calloway	B. Knowles; C. Elliott; Jovonn Alexander; Dupri^{[b]}; Joshua^{[c]}	7:16
11.	"Bills, Bills, Bills" (Maurice's Xclusive Livegig Mix)	Briggs; Burruss; B. Knowles; Luckett; Rowland	Joshua	3:23
12.	"So Good" (Maurice's Soul Remix)	Briggs; Burruss; B. Knowles; Luckett; Roberson; Rowland	Joshua	4:59
13.	"Heard a Word"	Michelle Williams; Louis Brown III; Scott Parker	Buster & Shavoni	4:57

Alternate track on international editions
No.	Title	Writer(s)	Producer(s)	Length
9.	"Nasty Girl" (Maurice's Nu Soul Remix Radio Edit)	B. Knowles; Dent; Bassi; Hackett	Joshua	4:08

Japanese bonus tracks
No.	Title	Writer(s)	Producer(s)	Length
14.	"Independent Women Part I" (Joe Smooth 200 Proof 2 Step Mix)	B. Knowles; Samuel Barnes; Cory Rooney; Jean-Claude Olivier	Joe Smooth	4:18
15.	"Bootylicious" (Ed Case Refix)	Fusari; B. Knowles; Moore	Ed Case; B. Knowles	4:45

Notes

- ^{^a} denotes co-producer
- ^{^b} denotes vocal producer
- ^{^c} denotes additional producer

Samples

- "No, No, No Part 2 (Extended Remix)" contains elements of "Strange Games and Things" as written by Barry White.
- "Bug a Boo (Refugee Camp Remix)" contains a sample from "Part Time Suckers" as written by Lawrence Parker.
- "Independent Women Part II" contains elements from "Peabody's Improbable History" as written by Frank Comstock.

== Charts ==
Chart (2002)	Peak position
Australian Albums (ARIA)	43
Australian Urban Albums (ARIA)	5
Austrian Albums (Ö3 Austria)	47
Belgian Albums (Ultratop Flanders)	24
Canadian Albums (Nielsen SoundScan)	51
Canadian R&B Albums (Nielsen SoundScan)	19
Dutch Albums (Album Top 100)	27
European Top 100 Albums (Music & Media)	50
French Albums (SNEP)	54
German Albums (Offizielle Top 100)	43
Greek Albums (IFPI Greece)	8
Irish Albums (IRMA)	59
Japanese Albums (Oricon)	60
New Zealand Albums (RMNZ)	8
Scottish Albums (Official Charts)	32
Swiss Albums (Schweizer Hitparade)	43
UK Albums (Official Charts)	25
UK R&B Albums (Official Charts)	8
US Billboard 200	29
US Top R&B/Hip-Hop Albums (Billboard)	19

=== Year-end charts ===
Chart (2002)	Position
Canadian R&B Albums (Nielsen SoundScan)	84

== Certifications ==
Region	Certification	Certified units/sales
South Korea	—	8,692
United Kingdom (BPI)	Gold	100,000^{^}
^{^} Shipments figures based on certification alone.
