= 8 Days of Christmas (song) =

2000 single by Destiny's Child

Single by Destiny's Child

from the album 8 Days of Christmas
- A-side: "Independent Women Part I"; "Emotion"
- Written: 1999
- Published: November 13, 2000
- Released: October 15, 2001
- Recorded: July 2000
- Studio: Manta Sound (Toronto)
- Genre: Christmas; R&B
- Length: 3:29
- Label: Columbia
- Songwriters: Errol McCalla, Jr.; Kelendria Rowland; Beyoncé Knowles
- Producers: Beyoncé Knowles; Errol McCalla, Jr.; Mathew Knowles

Destiny's Child singles chronology
"Emotion" (2001)	"8 Days of Christmas" (2001)	"What's Going On" (2001)

Music video
- "8 Days of Christmas" on YouTube

"8 Days of Christmas" is a song recorded by American girl group Destiny's Child for their Christmas album of the same title (2001). Written by group members Beyoncé and Kelly Rowland along with Errol McCalla Jr., who handled its production, it is a Christmas-themed song with heavy R&B and dance pop elements.

"8 Days of Christmas" was first included on the November 2000 reissue of Destiny's Child's second studio album The Writing's on the Wall (1999) and the US maxi CD single for their song "Independent Women Part I" (2000), before being released as the lead single from 8 Days of Christmas in October 2001, by Columbia Records.

== Background ==
"8 Days of Christmas" was written by Destiny's Child band members Beyoncé Knowles and Kelly Rowland along with Errol "Poppi" McCalla, Jr., while production was helmed by Knowles, her father Mathew and McCalla. The song contains re-sung lyrics from the traditional Christmas carol "The Twelve Days of Christmas" as well as replayed element from "Jingle Bells" as written by James Pierpont. Knowles stated during its video premiere at the BET countdown format 106 & Park in 2001: "Actually, we wrote the song two years ago, when we went in the studio to do some Christmas something. That's what started the idea of doing a Christmas album."

== Critical reception ==
"8 Days of Christmas" received generally favorable reviews from music critics, although it has been reevaluated in the decades since its release.

Jordyn Beazley of The Guardian wrote that even if "It was released 20 years ago" the meaning of the song "has only got better with age". Raffy Ermac of Pride Magazine described it as " a fun, sexy spin on "The Twelve Days of Christmas" in which "instead of true love giving you useless things, [...] Beyoncé, Kelly, and Michelle are getting showered with gifts." Maura Johnston of Vulture wrote that the song "shows off Destiny’s Child innovative approach to pop-R&B", praising the "dizzying pre-chorus and jubilant refrain to the original’s day-by-day rundown" and the "collective prowess on a fluttering bridge".

Time Out listed the song as the 22nd on its list of "The 65 Best Christmas Songs of All Time", defining it "A fine achievement" with "an injection of sass and unabashed materialism", which "turned a cosy old holiday favourite into a bumping R&B Christmas carol for our times". Cosmopolitan listed the song as the 11th of "The 75 Best Christmas Songs of All Time"

== Music video ==
The accompanying music video for "8 Days of Christmas" was directed by Sanaa Hamri and filmed in early October 2001. It shows all three members appearing in Santa Claus-inspired clothing at a toy store on a snowy day. Throughout the video, the group shops for various gifts and in between cuts and Knowles rides on a carousel. At the end of the video, many children rush into the toy store where the group gives out gifts.

The music video is featured on the DualDisc edition of 8 Days of Christmas.

== Track listings and formats ==
European CD single

1. "8 Days of Christmas" (album version) – 3:29
2. "Emotion" – 3:56

US promotional CD single

1. "8 Days of Christmas" (album version) – 3:29
2. "8 Days of Christmas" (instrumental) – 3:29
3. "8 Days of Christmas" (a cappella) – 3:29
4. Holiday Greeting "Merry Christmas" – 0:10
5. Holiday Greeting "Happy Holidays" – 0:09
6. Holiday Greeting "Seasons Greetings" – 0:10
7. Holiday Greeting "Happy Kwanzaa" – 0:08
8. Holiday Greeting "Happy New Year" – 0:12

== Charts ==
2002–2025 weekly chart performance for "8 Days of Christmas"
Chart	Peak position
Australia (ARIA)	68
Croatia International Airplay (Top lista)	80
Ireland (IRMA)	87
Netherlands (Dutch Top 40)	7
Netherlands (Single Top 100)	58
Nigeria Bubbling Under Top 100 (TurnTable)	22
UK Singles (OCC)	185
UK Hip Hop/R&B (Official Charts)	9
UK Audio Streaming (Official Charts)	75
US Bubbling Under Hot 100 (Billboard)	2
Hot R&B/Hip-Hop Songs (Billboard)	57

== Certifications ==
Certifications and sales for "8 Days of Christmas"
Region	Certification	Certified units/sales
Australia (ARIA)	Gold	35,000^{‡}
New Zealand (RMNZ)	Gold	15,000^{‡}
United Kingdom (BPI)	Gold	400,000^{‡}
^{‡} Sales+streaming figures based on certification alone.

== Release history ==
Release dates and formats for "8 Days of Christmas" (Note: "8 Days of Christmas" was released as a double A-side single with "Emotion".)
Region	Date	Format(s)	Label(s)	Ref.
France	October 15, 2001	Maxi CD	Columbia	
Germany	October 30, 2001	CD; maxi CD	Sony Music	
United Kingdom	November 12, 2001	Maxi CD	Columbia	

== Other versions ==
In 2023 American singer Coco Jones released a covered the song for Apple Music.
