= Nasty Girl (Destiny's Child song) =

2002 single by Destiny's Child

Single by Destiny's Child

from the album Survivor
- Released: March 4, 2002
- Recorded: July 2000
- Studio: Chase (Atlanta, Georgia); Digital Services (Houston, Texas)
- Genre: R&B
- Length: 4:18
- Label: Columbia
- Songwriters: Beyoncé Knowles; Anthony Dent; Maurizio Bassi; Naimy Hackett
- Producers: Beyoncé Knowles; Anthony Dent

Destiny's Child singles chronology
"What's Going On" (2001)	"Nasty Girl" (2002)	"Lose My Breath" (2004)

Music video
- "Nasty Girl" on YouTube

"Nasty Girl" is a song recorded by American group Destiny's Child for their third studio album Survivor (2001). Written by Maurizio Bassi, Naimy Hackett, and its producers Beyoncé Knowles and Anthony Dent, it features a distinct vocal interpolation of Salt-n-Pepa's "Push It" (1987) and Baltimora's "Tarzan Boy" (1985). The song was released as the fourth and final single from Survivor outside North America on March 4, 2002, by Columbia Records.

"Nasty Girl" reached the top 10 in Australia and the top 30 in Denmark, the Netherlands, and Switzerland. The accompanying music video for the song was directed by Sanaa Hamri. The song's Maurice's Nu Soul remix served as the second single from the group's remix album This Is the Remix (2002), following the Rockwilder remix of "Bootylicious".

== Music video ==
The music video for "Nasty Girl" starts out with close-ups of the girls chanting the opening lyrics. It transfers to a woman (portrayed by Tiffany Shepis) in a pink fur jacket, a thong, tight pants, high heels and strawberry blonde hair. She’s carrying bags, walking down a neighborhood sidewalk with women turning their heads to look and men pointing at her and talking amongst themselves. She trips and falls when Knowles sings the lyrics "Change don't come your way it will come back to you", causing everyone around her to ridicule her. After the chorus, it changes to two women walking out of a corner store and past a man eating a sandwich. Two guys standing there try to push their friend into the girls, but he slows down and starts to talk to one of the girls. The girl starts to wrap her gum around her finger but gets tangled in her hair and a piece of weave comes out.

The screen changes to a woman dancing with a man in a club, but he dislikes the way she is dancing. He tries to calm her down but she accidentally elbows him in the face and upon seeing what she did, she shows apathy and walks away. It switches to a room full of the previous girls and more in a line waiting to be put in a machine called the "NastyZapper" which transforms them into women with better clothes and hairstyles. Destiny's Child are also in a room with brown and gold tiles and a gold wall in the back. They are also seen sitting on a couch eating popcorn in Dark Blue and gold dresses watching each of the women in the video. The previously transformed women join the girls in the brown and gold room in the end.

The music video was sent to European and Australian music channels in two versions: a video with an edited "album version" and another video with the "Maurice's Nu Soul Remix Edit", which also uses other scenes at some parts. The original video was featured as an enhanced video on the European CD maxi release of the single.

== Track listings ==
All tracks written by Beyoncé Knowles, Anthony Dent, Maurizio Bassi, and Naimy Hackett.

European CD enhanced single
No.	Title	Producer(s)	Length
1.	"Nasty Girl" (Album Version)	Beyoncé Knowles; Anthony Dent	4:17
2.	"Nasty Girl" (Maurice's Nu Soul Remix Edit)	Knowles; Dent; Maurice Joshua^{[a]}	3:59
3.	"Nasty Girl" (Azza's Nu Soul Mix)	Knowles; Dent; Kay "Azza" Fingers^{[a]}	5:17
4.	"Nasty Girl" (Music video)

European 2-track single
No.	Title	Producer(s)	Length
1.	"Nasty Girl" (Radio Edit)	Knowles; Dent	3:31
2.	"Nasty Girl" (Maurice's Nu Soul Remix Edit)	Knowles; Dent; Joshua^{[a]}	3:59

Vinyl single
No.	Title	Producer(s)	Length
1.	"Nasty Girl" (Maurice's Nu Soul Remix Edit)	Knowles; Dent; Joshua^{[a]}	3:59
2.	"Nasty Girl" (Azza's Nu Soul Mix)	Knowles; Dent; Fingers^{[a]}	5:17
3.	"Nasty Girl" (Charlie's Nu Tech Dub)	Knowles; Dent; Charlie "DP3" Rosario^{[a]}	9:25
4.	"Nasty Girl" (Album Version)	Knowles; Dent	4:17

Notes

- ^{^[a]}signifies additional producer(s)

== Charts ==
=== Weekly charts ===
Chart (2002)	Peak position
Australia (ARIA)	10
Australian Urban (ARIA)	5
Austria (Ö3 Austria Top 40)	50
Belgium (Ultratop 50 Flanders)	31
Belgium (Ultratip Bubbling Under Wallonia)	1
Denmark (Tracklisten)	14
Europe (European Hot 100 Singles)	68
Germany (GfK)	36
Ireland (IRMA)	34
Netherlands (Dutch Top 40)	23
Netherlands (Single Top 100)	21
New Zealand (Recorded Music NZ)	46
Sweden (Sverigetopplistan)	32
Switzerland (Schweizer Hitparade)	22

=== Year-end charts ===
Chart (2002)	Position
Australia (ARIA)	99

== Certifications ==
Region	Certification	Certified units/sales
Australia (ARIA)	Gold	35,000^{^}
^{^} Shipments figures based on certification alone.

== Release history ==
Release dates and formats for "Nasty Girl"
Region	Date	Format(s)	Label(s)	Ref.
France	March 4, 2002	Maxi CD	Sony Music	
Germany	March 25, 2002	12-inch vinyl; maxi CD	Sony Music	
Australia	May 20, 2002	Maxi CD	Sony Music	
