= Rob Fusari =

Grammy winning American record producer and songwriter

Rob Fusari is a Grammy winning American record producer and songwriter based in New York City.

== Lady Gaga ==
In 2008, Fusari served as producer on Lady Gaga's debut album, The Fame. Although Fusari claimed to have discovered Gaga, it later came to light that Wendy Starland discovered her. Fusari was ordered by the court to pay Starland an undisclosed amount.

== Production discography ==
Key
†	Indicates single release
#	Indicates promotional single release

Title	Year	Artist(s)	Album	Co-writer	Producer
"No, No, No"†	1997	Destiny's Child	Destiny's Child	check	check
"Wild Wild West"†	1999	Will Smith (featuring Dru Hill and Kool Moe Dee)	Wild Wild West and Willennium	check	check
"Bootylicious"†	2001	Destiny's Child	Survivor	check	check
"Apple Pie à la Mode"	2001	Destiny's Child	Survivor	check	check
"Happy Face"	2001	Destiny's Child	Survivor	check	check
"Outro (DC-3) Thank You"	2001	Destiny's Child	Survivor	check	check
"You're the Only One"	2001	Destiny's Child	Destiny's Child (European reissue)	X mark	check
"Winter Paradise"	2001	Destiny's Child	8 Days of Christmas	check	check
"A "DC" Christmas Medley"	2001	Destiny's Child	8 Days of Christmas	X mark	check
"This Christmas"	2001	Destiny's Child	8 Days of Christmas	X mark	check
"This Goes Out"	2002	3LW	A Girl Can Mack	check	check
"Past 12"	2002	Kelly Rowland	Simply Deep	check	check
"Train on a Track"†	2002	Kelly Rowland	Simply Deep	check	check
"No Coincidence"	2002	Kelly Rowland	Simply Deep	check	check
"Love That Man"†	2002	Whitney Houston	Just Whitney	check	check
"Paparazzi"†	2008	Lady Gaga	The Fame	check	check
"Beautiful, Dirty, Rich"#	2008	Lady Gaga	The Fame	check	check
"Again Again"	2008	Lady Gaga	The Fame	check	check
"Brown Eyes"	2008	Lady Gaga	The Fame	check	check
"Disco Heaven"	2008	Lady Gaga	The Fame	check	check
"Vanity"#	2008	Lady Gaga	Non-album promotional single	check	check
"Retro Dance Freak"	2009	Lady Gaga	The Fame (Japanese edition)	check	check
"Bang Bang"†	2009	Melanie Fiona	The Bridge	check	check
"Fever"†	2009	Adam Lambert	For Your Entertainment	check	X mark
"Shadow"	2013	f(x)	Pink Tape	X mark	check
"Brave Honest Beautiful"	2015	Fifth Harmony (featuring Meghan Trainor)	Reflection	check	check
