= Heart to Yours =

Studio album by Michelle Williams
- Released: April 16, 2002
- Recorded: 2001–2002
- Genre: Gospel
- Length: 47:55
- Labels: Sanctuary; Columbia
- Producers: Erron Williams; Buster; Shavoni; Warryn Campbell; Shirley Caesar; H.R. Crump; Damon Elliott; Luther "Mano" Hanes; Paul Hemphill; Michael E. Mathis; Kayla Parker; Bubba Smith

Michelle Williams chronology
Heart to Yours (2002)	Do You Know (2004)

Singles from Heart to Yours
- 1. "Heard a Word" Released: March 5, 2002

Heart to Yours is the debut solo studio album by American singer and songwriter Michelle Williams. Released on April 16, 2002, by Sanctuary and Columbia Records, it became the first solo release of any Destiny's Child member. Production of the album began in 2001, with Williams working with an array of producers, including her brother Erron Williams (who produced the title track), HR Crump and Warryn Campbell. Heart to Yours is primarily a contemporary gospel album, which incorporates elements of other styles and genres such as neo-soul, inspirational, R&B and rock music. The album includes a tribute, dedicated to the victims and families affected by the September 11, 2001, attacks in the United States. Writing on her vocal performances, critics drew comparisons to Ella Fitzgerald, Diana Ross, Erykah Badu and Jill Scott.

Receiving generally positive reviews from critics, Heart to Yours peaked at number one on the US Billboard Top Gospel Albums chart, after debuting at number two with 17,000 copies sold in its first week. It has since sold over 220,000 copies in the US alone and 500,000 worldwide; becoming one of 2002's best-selling gospel albums. The album was ranked number six on the 2002 year-end chart and Billboard ranked Williams as the fifth Top Gospel Artist of 2002. The album was also a success on the US Billboard Top R&B/Hip-Hop Albums chart, where it peaked within the top 20 at number 17. It also reached a moderate 57 on the US Billboard 200. The album won Williams an award for "Best Gospel Act" at the 2002 MOBO Awards and its lead single "Heard a Word" was featured on the RIAA platinum-certified WOW Gospel 2003 compilation album.

== Background and production ==
Williams began her singing career as a backing vocalist for R&B singer Monica in 1999 before joining Destiny's Child with Farrah Franklin alongside original members Beyoncé Knowles and Kelly Rowland, replacing former members LeToya Luckett and LaTavia Roberson to much controversy in 2000. In late 2000, while recording their third album, Survivor, Destiny's Child revealed that they would produce solo albums to be released "simultaneously" in the "hope" that they would "boost interest in Destiny's Child". Describing the stylistic differences of the albums' directions, Knowles said "We're going to all do different types of music and support each other's album" before saying "hopefully it will broaden our audience, so it will help us all out". The idea of individual releases emanated from the group's manager and Knowles' father, Mathew. After the release of Survivor, the group announced in early 2002 a temporary break-up to focus on solo projects, including working on their own albums. Before undertaking their respective solo projects, the group released a Christmas album, 8 Days of Christmas.

Williams worked in the studio with several musical collaborators, including Scott “Shavoni” Parker, Damon Elliott, Warren Campbell and gospel producer HR Crump. Williams also co-wrote five of the songs whilst her brother Erron Williams, produced numerous tracks. She revealed in an interview with Gospel Flava that she "received tremendous support" from Music World, saying, "they came to me. There wasn't a question as to what type of music I was going to do. Music World has a Gospel division and I'm the first artist to come out on Music World and in the Gospel division. I'd love to do more and more Gospel projects". She also discussed her Christian upbringing, saying, "I grew up in Rockford, Illinois. St. Paul Church Of God In Christ was and still is my home church". Furthermore, she explained, "I sang my first solo at the age of seven. I directed the choir, I was an usher. I was a straight-up church girl. I did a lot of stuff in the community such as singing in various choirs and at my school." In discussing the musical transition she said, "it wasn't a hard transition at all. This is something that has been in my heart to do, so I had to do it. I thought that it would be a perfect time. Choosing to do this at the height of my career rather than doing it when Destiny's Child is at a downfall, you know? Most people do that. They go Gospel when they don't have anything else to do anymore, you know? I chose to do this while I can reach people." She echoed this sentiment in speaking with Billboard about the album and its artistic direction, saying: "Some people will do gospel when their career fails, but I chose to do it at the height of the popularity of Destiny's Child. I didn't want to do it because it was a fad. I wanted to do it because it's in me. It's in my heart."

== Content and composition ==
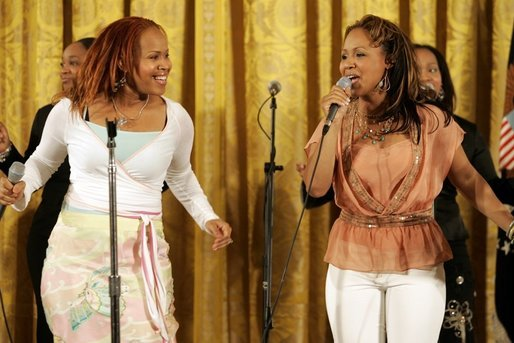
Duo Mary Mary (pictured) co-wrote and feature on "So Glad".

Generally, the album consists of urban contemporary gospel containing elements of R&B, neo-soul and traditional black gospel music, with inspirational lyrics about building, maintaining and appreciating a relationship with God which also encourage the listener that "everything is going to work out fine". The album's lead single, "Heard a Word", sums up the theme of the album, with its chorus: "I heard a word / Saying girl, you'll be fine / I heard a word that would ease my troubled mind / Took all the hurt away / Warmed me up inside like a summer day / So glad that you'd never break your promises". Other songs are tributes to the victims of the September 11, 2001, attacks in the United States; "Better Place", written by Michelle Williams, Damon Elliott and Kayla Parker, is one such example which was inspired by the catastrophic event and is an emotional tribute to those who died in the attack.

The album features guest vocals by various artists, including Williams' Destiny's Child bandmates – Kelly Rowland and Beyoncé Knowles – on "Gospel Medley" (originally produced for the group's 2001 album, Survivor) which consists of an interpolation of Kirk Franklin's "Holy is the Lamb", the popular Anna B. Warner hymn "Jesus Loves Me" and concludes with the famous final section of Richard Smallwood's "Total Praise". Other guests include Carl Thomas on a remixed version of the BeBe & CeCe Winans classic, "Heaven", (featured as a bonus track on the album); Men of Standard's Isaac Carree and Lowell C. Pye on "You Care for Me"; Mary Mary on "So Glad"; and Shirley Caesar on "Steal Away to Jesus", which was heralded by most critics as "the album's high point" and was first included on Caesar's 2001 album, Hymns.

In discussing the collaborations, Williams said it was "no problem" to connect with the featured artists on the album, saying "a phone call was made and we were already cool with one another. It kinda wasn't even a business thing. It was like 'that's my girl', you know, and I personally asked them myself. So that's how that went." She also revealed she was "initially uncertain about boldly referencing Jesus on the project". Whilst discussing the lyrical content she stated, "at first I was like, 'should I say Jesus', but before I knew it, I couldn't help but to [say His name] [...] I wasn't going to let anybody stop me from doing that...not that anybody really was, you know?".

== Critical reception ==
Professional ratings
Review scores
Source	Rating
AllMusic	4/5 stars
Cross Rhythms	10/10 squares
Entertainment Weekly	D+
Slant Magazine	3/5 stars

Heart to Yours received generally positive reviews from critics. William Ruhlmann of AllMusic complimented the non-hasty production of the album, noting that "there are different producers on nearly every track, and the arrangements for the most part are state-of-the-art urban contemporary efforts". Ruhlmann also described Williams' voice as "warm" and "kittenish" before writing that "by the time Williams is trading lines with Isaac Carree and Lowell Pye of Men of Standard" she "has transformed herself from kitten to tiger, belting out the words with absolute conviction". GospelCity.com also praised "Michelle's delicate vocals" – particularly on "You Care For Me" where Williams' "soulful chops" are said to "shine through brilliantly" – and noted that on "Heard A Word", Williams "demonstrates further versatility in Ella-like fashion", concluding the review by describing Heart to Yours as a "melodically pleasant, lyrically sound gospel project".

Sal Cinquemani of Slant Magazine also described Williams' voice was "warm", noting that it recalls "the playful wisps of her R&B contemporaries (Jill Scott, Erykah Badu) and the breathy timbre of Diana Ross". Cinquemani then described the album as being "a mix of slick hip-hop-style beats, inspirational themes and catchy, pop-friendly hooks" with "admirable", "largely restrained arrangements", lending particular praise to the "surprisingly eloquent (and non-denominational) sentiment" that is featured within the lyrics of the album's title track ("Heart to Yours"). Tracy Hopkins of Rolling Stone magazine gave the least favorable review however, stating that despite Williams' collaborations with contemporary gospel singers, they "only reinforce the thin-piped vocalist's shortcomings". Hopkins also wrote that although Williams "is in the right place", her vocals are "too quiet" and the production is too "tame to start a real Holy Ghost party". On the contrary, Mike Rimmer of Cross Rhythms gave a very favorable review of the album (10/10), describing "the quality" as being "superb throughout" and "Michelle's soulful laid back vocals" as being "delicious throughout".

== Accolades ==
Year	Category	Recording	Result
MOBO Awards
2002	Best Gospel Act	Heart to Yours	Won
GMA Dove Awards
2002	Traditional Gospel Recorded Song of the Year	"Steal Away to Jesus"	Nominated
Gospel Music Excellence Awards
2003	Female Vocalist of the Year – Urban Contemporary	Heart to Yours	Nominated
Stellar Awards
2003	New Artist of the Year	Heart to Yours	Nominated

== Commercial reception ==
While her musical cohorts were finishing their projects, Williams' management strategically planned a successive release of their albums to avoid "rivalry" on the charts. Over a period of one year, Williams released Heart to Yours on April 16, 2002, in the United States, ahead of Kelly Rowland's 2002 album, Simply Deep and Beyoncé Knowles' 2003 Dangerously in Love – all debut releases. Williams expressed that she wanted "to reach everyone" and hoped "that a small percentage of Destiny's Child's fanbase" would "get it and be reached" and "hear a different message".

"Heard a Word" was sent to Urban AC radio in September, 2002. On September 27, 2002, "Heard a Word" and "Heart to Yours" were the 5th and 13th most added songs on Urban AC radio. Between October and December, 2002, "Heart to Yours" appeared several times as a 'New & Active' title receiving airplay but did not debut in the Urban AC Top 30. On November 29, 2002, "Heart to Yours" did however rise to number 6 on the Radio & Records Christian Rhythmic Specialty Programming chart, where it continued to chart in the top 10 until February 7, 2003.

The album entered the Billboard Top Gospel Albums chart at number two, behind The Rebirth of Kirk Franklin, with first week sales of 17,000 copies. In its 13th week on Top Gospel Albums, Heart to Yours peaked at number-one. Eventually spending a total of 46 weeks on the chart, Heart to Yours became one of the best-selling gospel album of the year. In addition to this, the album was listed at number six on the US Billboard Year-End Top Gospel Albums chart in 2002, making it one of the most successful gospel releases of the year on the Billboard charts. On the main album chart in the US, the Billboard 200, the album reached number 57 on May 4, 2002, spending 14 weeks on the chart and also peaked within the top 20 of the Top R&B/Hip-Hop Albums chart, at number 17, where the album spent 24 weeks. By October 12, 2002, the album had sold 159,000 units in the US and more than 198,000 US copies by February 12, 2004. On November 14, 2004, The New York Times reported Heart to Yours had sold 203,622 copies in the US, whilst Radio & Records reported sales of 220,000 in 2008. In the UK, Cross Rhythms ranked the songs "Rock With Me" (21) and "Heart To Yours" (26) on its year-end Top 100 Chart for 2002, whilst the album has sold 3,200 UK copies as of July, 2003. Worldwide, the album has sold 500,000 units as of 2014.

== Track listing ==
Heart to Yours track listing
No.	Title	Writer(s)	Producer(s)	Length
1.	"Heart to Yours"	Erron Williams; Michelle Williams; Kayla Parker; Damion Washington	Erron Williams; Parker^{[A]}	3:54
2.	"Heard a Word"	Michelle Williams; Louis Brown III; Scott Parker	Buster & Shavoni	4:56
3.	"So Glad" (featuring Mary Mary)	Erica Campbell; Tina Campbell; Warryn Campbell; Francisco Santacruz	Campbell; Flintstone	3:54
4.	"Sun Will Shine Again"	Parker	Luther "Mano" Hanes; Parker	4:18
5.	"Better Place (9.11)"	Michelle Williams; Damon Elliott; Parker	Damon Elliott	3:01
6.	"Change the World"	HR Crump; Cole Brown	HR Crump	3:59
7.	"Everything"	HR Crump; Michelle Williams; Parker; Alvin Williams	HR Crump	3:33
8.	"You Care for Me" (featuring Isaac Carree and Lowell Pye of Men of Standard)	HR Crump	HR Crump	5:56
9.	"Steal Away to Jesus" (duet with Shirley Caesar)	Wallace Willis; Shirley Caesar	Caesar; Bubba Smith; Michael E. Mathis	3:27
10.	"Rock with Me"	Erron Williams; Parker	Erron Williams	6:04
11.	"Gospel Medley" (Destiny's Child)	Beyoncé Knowles; Kirk Franklin; Richard Smallwood	Knowles	3:26
12.	"Heaven" (bonus track featuring Carl Thomas)	BeBe Winans; Keith Thomas	Mario Winans; Sean "P. Diddy" Combs; Paul Hemphill^{[B]}	3:07

Japan bonus track
No.	Title	Writer(s)	Producer(s)	Length
13.	"Steal Away to Jesus" (remix) (duet with Shirley Caesar)	Wallace Willis; Shirley Caesar	Caesar; Smith; Mathis	3:52
Total length:				47:55

Notes

- ^{^[A]} denotes co-producer
- ^{^[B]} denotes additional producer
- "Steal Away to Jesus" is a completely re-worked cover of the Wallace Willis hymn which was arranged by Shirley Caesar (who also features on the track).
- "Rock with Me" contains resung elements from "Cornerstone" by Leon Patillo.
- "Gospel Medley" consists of an interpolation of Kirk Franklin's "Now Behold the Lamb", the Anna Bartlett Warner hymn "Jesus Loves Me" and concludes with the final section of Richard Smallwood's "Total Praise".

== Credits ==
Credits are taken from the album's liner notes.

Managerial

- Executive producers – Mathew Knowles
- A&R – Alvin Williams

Performance credits

- Lead vocals – Michelle Williams
- Guest vocals – Mary Mary (track 3 "So Glad"), Isaac Carree & Lowell Pye (of Men of Standard) (track 8 "You Care For Me"), Shirley Caesar (track 9 "Steal Away to Jesus"), Destiny's Child (track 11 "Gospel Medley"), Carl Thomas (track 12 "Heaven")
- Backing vocals – Michelle Williams, Isaac Carree, Lowell Pye, Kayla Parker, Damon Elliott, New Direction, The Caesar Singers (Lisa Butts, Gene Conyers, Donald Gore, Michael E. Mathis, Bernard Sterling)

Visuals and imagery

- Art direction – Ian Cuttler, Chris Feldmann
- Design – Ian Cuttler
- Graphic artist – Frank Carbonari
- Photography – Christopher Kolk

Instruments

- Bass – Chris Kent, Shavoni
- Drums – John Hammond, Shavoni
- Guitar – Criss Johnson, Eric Walls
- Keyboard – Sean Dancy, Israel Embry, Maurice Rodgers
- Organ – Maurice Rodgers
- Percussion – Eric Darken
- Piano – Michael E. Mathis
- Saxophone – Sam Levine
- Trombone – Barry Green
- Trumpet – Steve Patrick

Technical and Production

- Engineers – Buster & Shavoni, Cedric Courtois, Dan Workman, Larry Sturm, Peter Thyssen, Rich Balmer, Thor Laewe, Wayne Allison
- Mixing – Dave "Hard Drive" Pensado, Kevin Parker, Larry Sturm, Buster & Shavoni, Thor Laewe, Wayne Allison
- Music producers – Scott Shavoni Parker, Buster, Warryn Campbell, Shirley Caesar, H.R. Crump, Damon Elliott, Luther "Mano" Hanes, Paul Hemphill, Michael E. Mathis, Kayla Parker, Bubba Smith, Erron Williams
- Vocal producer – HR Crump, Kayla Parker

== Charts ==
=== Weekly charts ===
Weekly chart performance for Heart to Yours
Chart (2002)	Peak position
US Billboard 200	57
US Top Christian Albums (Billboard)	3
US Top Gospel Albums (Billboard)	1
US Top R&B/Hip-Hop Albums (Billboard)	17

=== Year-end charts ===
Year-end chart performance for Heart to Yours
Chart (2002)	Peak position
US Christian Albums (Billboard)	24
US Top Gospel Albums (Billboard)	6

== Release history ==
Heart to Yours release history
Region	Date	Label
United States	April 16, 2002	Sanctuary, Columbia
United Kingdom	May 13, 2002	Sony Music
Japan	September 13, 2002	Sony Music
Germany	December 2, 2003	Sony Music
