= Richard Smallwood (musician) =

American gospel artist (1948–2025)

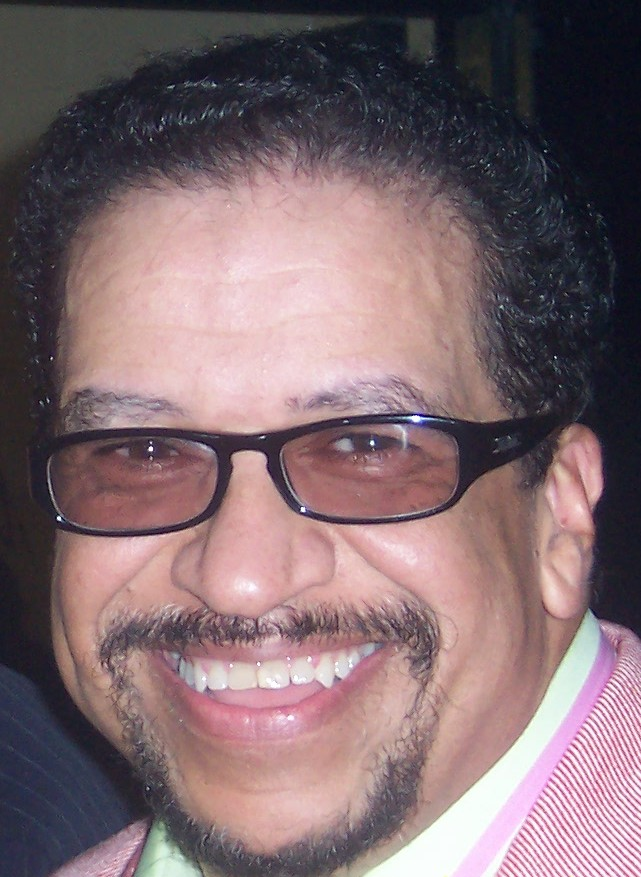
- Smallwood in 2005

Background information
- Born: Richard Lee Smallwood; November 30, 1948; Atlanta, Georgia, U.S.
- Origin: Washington, D.C., U.S.
- Died: December 30, 2025 (aged 77) Sandy Spring, Maryland, U.S.
- Genre: Gospel
- Occupations: Composer; music director; pianist; arranger singer
- Instrument: Piano
- Labels: Onyx/Muscle Shoals Sound; Sparrow; Word; Capitol; Jive; Verity

Richard Lee Smallwood (November 30, 1948 – December 30, 2025) was an American gospel songwriter, composer, arranger, singer, and pianist. He was best known for blending Traditional Gospel Music, with classical, R&B, soul, choral compositions, and other Christian music genres.

== Life and career ==
Richard Smallwood was born in Atlanta on November 30, 1948. He graduated cum laude from Howard University with a dual B.A. degree in classical vocal performance and piano, in addition to graduate work in the field of ethnomusicology. Smallwood was a member of the Celestials, the first gospel group at Howard University. The group was the first gospel act to appear at Switzerland's Montreux Jazz Festival. Smallwood was also a founding member of the university's first gospel choir.

Smallwood's recording career began in 1982 with the album The Richard Smallwood Singers. The album spent 87 weeks on Billboard's gospel chart. Its follow-up, Psalms, was nominated for a Grammy Award. Two years later his Textures album was also nominated. Textures included the song "Center Of My Joy" which was written by Smallwood with Bill and Gloria Gaither. Smallwood won his first Grammy Award, along with a Dove Award, for his production on the Quincy Jones and Mervyn Warren album Handel's Messiah: A Soulful Celebration.

Smallwood's music has been recorded by many artists including Destiny's Child, Yolanda Adams, and Karen Clark-Sheard. He accompanied opera singer Leontyne Price at a Christmas celebration at the White House during the Reagan administration. Smallwood, with his group Vision, recorded several successful projects for the Verity label. He finished his master's degree in divinity from Howard University in 2004 and was inducted into the Gospel Music Hall of Fame in 2006.

One of his concerts was recorded live at the Hammerstein Ballroom at the Manhattan Center in New York. The concert features guests Kim Burrell on “Journey”, Kelly Price on “Morning's Breaking”, Chaka Khan on “Precious Is Your Name”, as well as the Hawkins Family, Tramaine Hawkins, and the original roster of singers who comprised both the Richard Smallwood Singers and Vision. Aretha Franklin and the Clark Sisters contributed to additional studio tracks on the album.

Among Smallwood's most popular songs are “Total Praise”, composed in 1996 while he was experiencing sorrow in his life, and “I Love the Lord”, popularized by singer Whitney Houston in the film The Preacher's Wife.

Smallwood died in Sandy Spring, Maryland, on December 30, 2025, due to kidney failure, at the age of 77.

== Discography ==
=== Albums ===
with Union Temple Baptist Church Young Adult Choir

- Look Up And Live (1974)
- Give Us Peace (1976)

with Richard Smallwood Singers

- Richard Smallwood Singers (1982)
- Psalms (1984)
- Textures (1987)
- Vision (1988)
- Portrait (1990)
- Testimony (1992)
- Live at Howard University (1993)

with Vision

- Adoration: Live in Atlanta (1996)
- Rejoice (Christmas Project) (1997)
- Healing: Live in Detroit (1999)
- Persuaded: Live in D.C. (2001)
- Journey: Live in New York (2007)
- Promises (2011)
- Anthology Live (2015)

== Awards and nominations ==
=== Dove Awards ===
The Dove Awards are awarded annually by the Gospel Music Association. Smallwood has been inducted into the Hall of Fame and has also won 4 awards from 19 nominations.

Year	Award	Nominated work	Result
1983	Inspiration Black Gospel Album of the Year	Richard Smallwood Singers	Nominated
1985	Contemporary Black Gospel Album of the Year	Pslams	Nominated
1988	Contemporary Black Gospel Album of the Year	Textures	Nominated
1993	Contemporary Black Gospel Album of the Year	Handel's Messiah - A Soulful Celebration	Won
1993	Contemporary Black Gospel Album of the Year	Testimony	Nominated
1993	Traditional Black Gospel Recorded Song of the Year	"T'will Be Sweet"	Won
1993	Contemporay Black Gospel Recorded Sonf od the Year	"What He's Done For Me"	Nominated
1994	Contemporary Black Gospel Album of the Year	Live at Howard University	Nominated
1994	Contemporary Black Gospel Recorded Song of the Year	"In The Shelter"	Nominated
1994	Traditional Black Gospel Recorded Song of the Year	"In The Shelter"	Nominated
2000	Traditional Gospel Album of the Year	Healing - Live in Detroit	Won
2000	Contemporary Gospel Recording of the Year	"Holy Thou Art God"	Nominated
2000	Traditional Gospel Recorded Song of the Year	"Highest Praise"	Nominated
2000	Traditional Gospel Recorded Song of the Year	"Healing"	Nominated
2002	Traditional Gospel Recorded Song of the Year	"My Everything (Praise Waiteth)"	Nominated
2002	Traditional Gospel Album of the Year	Persuaded - Live in D.C.	Nominated
2006	Gospel Music Hall of Fame	Himself	Inducted
2012	Traditional Gospel Album of the Year	Promises	Won
2024	Inspirational Recorded Song of the Year	"Center of My Joy"	Nominated
2025	Traditional Gospel Recorded Song of the Year	"When I Think (Radio Edit / Live)"	Nominated

=== Grammy Awards ===
The Grammy Awards are awarded annually by the National Academy of Recording Arts and Sciences. Smallwood has been nominated 8 times.

Year	Award	Nominated work	Result
1985	Best Soul Gospel Performance By A Duo Or Group	Psalm	Nominated
1989	Best Soul Gospel Performance, Male	"You Did It All"	Nominated
1991	Best Contemporary Soul Gospel Album	Portrait	Nominated
1993	Best Contemporary Soul Gospel Album	Testimony	Nominated
1994	Best Contemporary Soul Gospel Album	Live	Nominated
2002	Best Traditional Soul Gospel Album	Persuaded - Live in DC	Nominated
2005	Best Traditional Soul Gospel Album	The Praise & Worship Songs	Nominated
2012	Best Gospel Song	"Trust Me"	Nominated

=== NAACP Image Awards ===
The NAACP Image Awards are awarded annually by the National Association for the Advancement of Colored People (NAACP). Smallwood has been nominated once.

Year	Award	Nominated work	Result
2001	Best Gospel Artist, Traditional	Himself	Nominated

=== Stellar Awards ===
The Stellar Awards are awarded annually by SAGMA. Smallwood has received 1 honorary award as well as 6 awards from 29 nominations.

Year	Award	Nominated work	Result
1992	Best Group/Duo - Contemporary	Testimony	Nominated
2000	Choir of the Year	Healing - Live in Detroit	Won
2000	Traditional Choir of the Year	Healing - Live in Detroit	Won
2000	Traditional Male Vocalist of the Year	Healing - Live in Detroit	Won
2000	Artist of the Year	Healing - Live in Detroit	Nominated
2000	CD of the Year	Healing - Live in Detroit	Nominated
2000	Male Vocalist of the Year	Healing - Live in Detroit	Nominated
2000	Music Video of the Year	Healing - Live in Detroit	Nominated
2000	Producer of the Year	Healing - Live in Detroit	Nominated
2000	Song of the Year	"Healing"	Nominated
2001	Producer of the Year	Mountain High... Valley Low	Nominated
2003	Traditional CD of the Year	Persuaded. Live in DC	Won
2003	Traditional Choir of the Year	Persuaded. Live in DC	Won
2003	Artist of the Year	Persuaded. Live in DC	Nominated
2003	CD of the Year	Persuaded. Live in DC	Nominated
2003	Choir of the Year	Persuaded. Live in DC	Nominated
2003	Male Vocalist of the Year	Persuaded. Live in DC	Nominated
2003	Music Video of the Year	Persuaded. Live in DC	Nominated
2003	Producer of the Year	Persuaded. Live in DC	Nominated
2003	Traditional Male Vocalist of the Year	Persuaded. Live in DC	Nominated
2003	Song of the Year	"My Everything (Praise Waiteth)"	Nominated
2005	James Cleveland Lifetime Achievement Award	Himself	Honored
2008	Traditional Male Vocalist of the Year	Journey: Live in New York	Won
2013	Choir of the Year	Promises	Nominated
2013	Traditional Choir of the Year	Promises	Nominated
2016	Choir of the Year	Anthology Live	Nominated
2016	Praise and Worship CD of the Year	Anthology Live	Nominated
2016	Special Event CD of the Year	Anthology Live	Nominated
2016	Traditional Choir of the Year	Anthology Live	Nominated
2016	Traditional Male Vocalist of the Year	Anthology Live	Nominated

=== Miscellaneous honors ===
Year	Organization	Award	Nominated work	Result	Ref.
1997	Howard University	Distinguished Achievement Award	Himself	Honored	
2006	Richmond Virginia Seminary	Honorary Doctorate of Sacred Music	Himself	Honored	
2023	President Joe Biden	President's Lifetime Achievement Award	Himself	Honored	
