= 8 Days of Christmas =

Studio album by Destiny's Child
- Released: October 30, 2001
- Recorded: July 2000 – September 2001
- Studios: Manta Sound (Toronto, ON); Digital Services (Houston, TX); Studio M (San Antonio, TX); The Enterprise Studios (Burbank, CA); Sony Music Studios (New York, NY); Morrisound Recording (Tampa, FL); Chicago Trax (Chicago, IL); The Hit Factory (New York, NY); Sony Music Studios (Tokyo, Japan); SugarHill Recording Studios (Houston, TX); Flyte Tyme Studios (Edina, MN)
- Genres: Christmas; R&B
- Length: 41:00
- Label: Columbia
- Producers: Bama Boyz; Damon Elliott; Kurt Farguhar; Focus...; Alan Foyd; Rob Fusari; Alonzo Jackson; Beyoncé Knowles; Errol McCalla Jr.; Falante Moore; Willie Morris; Ric Wake; Erron Williams

Destiny's Child chronology
Survivor (2001)	8 Days of Christmas (2001)	This Is the Remix (2002)

Singles from 8 Days of Christmas
- 1. "8 Days of Christmas" Released: October 15, 2001

8 Days of Christmas is the only Christmas album and fourth studio album by American R&B girl group Destiny's Child, released on October 30, 2001, by Columbia Records.

== Background ==
The album contains twelve tracks featuring traditional Christmas songs and three original songs. Most of them are re-arranged with up-tempo beats in a contemporary R&B style. The album was recorded in summer 2001 in the United States, but Kelly Rowland stated during the "8 Days of Christmas" video premiere on BET's 106 & Park in autumn 2001 that parts of the album were also recorded in Japan during Destiny's Child's overseas promo tour. In the same interview, Beyoncé revealed, "Actually we wrote the song two years ago when we went in the studio to do some Christmas something. That's what started the idea of doing a Christmas album." The song "8 Days of Christmas" first appeared on the double-disc reissue of The Writing's on the Wall in November 2000.

== Critical reception ==
Professional ratings
Review scores
Source	Rating
AllMusic	2.5/5 stars
The Encyclopedia of Popular Music	2/5 stars
Entertainment Weekly	B+
The Guardian	2/5 stars
New York Post	2/4 stars
Slant Magazine	2.5/5 stars
Yahoo! Music UK	4/10

8 Days of Christmas received generally mixed to positive reviews from critics. Stephen Thomas Erlewine of AllMusic, gave the album 2.5 out 5 stars. In his review, he felt that it did not offer anything different from any other Christmas album and that it had the same formula as every other Christmas album, making it very predictable. Chris Willman of Entertainment Weekly gave the album a B+. He felt that the album had a rough start, stating that song lyrics such as, "a pair of Chloe shades and a diamond belly ring" were too materialistic, leaving a bad taste in your mouth, however, he stated that originals like "Winter Christmas", and "This Christmas" helped the album quickly recover. People gave the album a mixed review, stating that some songs of the album fell short, but despite that, there were a few gifts on the album, such as "Carol of the Bells". They came to the conclusion that while it was good, it was not destined for success. Alexa Camp of Slant Magazine gave the album 2.5 out of 5 stars. She said that the album sounded like a, "Survivor II: Winter Ghetto-chic," and that the album brought little justice to the original songs.

== Commercial performance ==
8 Days of Christmas made its debut on the Billboard 200 at number 59. On the chart issue dated December 22, 2001, it reached its peak at number 34. On December 3, 2001, the album was certified Platinum by the Recording Industry Association of America (RIAA) denoting shipments of 1,000,000 copies.

== Track listing ==
Credits adapted from the album's liner notes

8 Days of Christmas – Standard edition
No.	Title	Writer(s)	Producer(s)	Length
1.	"8 Days of Christmas"	Beyoncé Knowles; Kelly Rowland; Errol McCalla	B. Knowles; McCalla; Mathew Knowles	3:31
2.	"Winter Paradise"	B. Knowles; Rob Fusari; Falonte Moore; George Michael	B. Knowles; Fusari; Moore	3:36
3.	"A "DC" Christmas Medley"	Haven Gillespie; Fred Coots; James Pierpont^{[a]}; Steve Nelson; Jack Rollins; Johnny Marks; Thomas Oliphant^{[a]}; Gene Autry; Oakley Haldeman	B. Knowles; Fusari; Moore	3:59
4.	"Silent Night" (Beyoncé)	Franz Gruber^{[b]}; Joseph Mohr^{[b]}	B. Knowles	3:41
5.	"Little Drummer Boy" (featuring Solange)	Katherine Davis; Henry Onorati; Harry Simeone	B. Knowles; Alonzo Jackson	3:36
6.	"Do You Hear What I Hear" (Kelly Rowland)	Noël Regney; Gloria Shaine	Wirlie Morris; Alan Floyd	3:47
7.	"White Christmas"	Irving Berlin	B. Knowles; Damon Elliott	1:42
8.	"Platinum Bells"	Ray Evans; Jay Livingston	B. Knowles; Elliott	1:26
9.	"O' Holy Night" (Michelle Williams)	Placide Cappeau^{[c]}; Adolphe Adam^{[c]}	E. Williams	4:24
10.	"Spread a Little Love on Christmas Day"	B. Knowles; Bernard Edwards Jr.	B. Knowles; Focus...; Ric Wake	3:41
11.	"This Christmas"	Donny Hathaway; Nadine McKinnor	B. Knowles; Fusari; Calvin Gaines^{[c]}; Bill Lee^{[c]}	3:38
12.	"Opera of the Bells"	Mykola Leontovych^{[b]}; Peter Wilhousky^{[b]}	B. Knowles	4:34

8 Days of Christmas – International bonus track
No.	Title	Writer(s)	Producer(s)	Length
13.	"The Proud Family" (Solange featuring Destiny's Child)	Kurt Farquhar; Gerald Harbour	B. Knowles^{[d]}; Farquhar	2:17

8 Days of Christmas – Japan and Wal-Mart edition
No.	Title	Writer(s)	Producer(s)	Length
14.	"Emotion" (with strings)	Barry Gibb; Robin Gibb	B. Knowles; Mark Feist	4:23

8 Days of Christmas – 2005 reissue and digital edition
No.	Title	Writer(s)	Producer(s)	Length
1.	"Home for the Holidays"	B. Knowles; Solange; Eddie “E-Trez” Smith III; Jesse J. Rankins; Jonathan D. Wells	B. Knowles; Solange; Bama Boyz	3:10
2.	"Rudolph the Red-Nosed Reindeer"	Johnny Marks	B. Knowles; McCalla	2:34
3.	"8 Days of Christmas"	B. Knowles; McCalla	B. Knowles; McCalla; M. Knowles	3:31
4.	"Winter Paradise"	B. Knowles; Fusari; Moore; Michael	B. Knowles; Fusari; Moore	3:36
5.	"A "DC" Christmas Medley"	Gillespie; Coots; Pierpont^{[a]}; Nelson; Rollins; Marks; Oliphant^{[a]}; Autry; Haldeman	B. Knowles; Fusari; Moore	3:59
6.	"Silent Night" (Beyoncé)	Gruber^{[b]}; Mohr^{[b]}	B. Knowles	3:41
7.	"Little Drummer Boy" (Solange)	Davis; Onorati; Simeone	B. Knowles; Jackson	3:36
8.	"Do You Hear What I Hear" (Kelly Rowland)	Regney; Shaine	Morris; Floyd	3:47
9.	"White Christmas"	Berlin	B. Knowles; Elliott	1:42
10.	"Platinum Bells"	Evans; Livingston	B. Knowles; Elliott	1:26
11.	"O' Holy Night" (Michelle Williams)	Cappeau^{[c]}; Adam^{[c]}	E. Williams	4:24
12.	"Spread a Little Love on Christmas Day"	B. Knowles; Edwards Jr.	B. Knowles; Focus...; Wake	3:41
13.	"This Christmas"	Hathaway; McKinnor	B. Knowles; Fusari; Gaines^{[c]}; Lee^{[c]}	3:38
14.	"Opera of the Bells"	Leontovych^{[b]}; Wilhousky^{[b]}	B. Knowles	4:34

Notes

- ^a signifies a writer credited as "traditional"
- ^b The album liner notes credit "Silent Night" and "Opera of the Bells" as being written by Beyoncé Knowles.
- ^c The album liner notes credit "O' Holy Night" as being written by Michelle Williams, Erron Williams and Kim Burse.
- ^d signifies a producer and vocal producer

Sample Credits

- "8 Days of Christmas" contains re-sung lyrics from Traditional Christmas Carol "The Twelve Days of Christmas" & a replayed element from "Jingle Bells" written by James Pierpont
- "Winter Paradise" contains replayed elements from "Father Figure", written & performed by George Michael.
- "A 'DC' Christmas Medley" incorporates lyrics from "Santa Claus Is Coming to Town", "Jingle Bells", "Frosty the Snowman", "Have a Holly Jolly Christmas", "Deck the Halls" and "Here Comes Santa Claus".
- "Little Drummer Boy" originally performed by The Harry Simeone Chorale and based on "Carol of the Drum" performed by The Trapp Family Singers
- "Do You Hear What I Hear?" originally performed by The Harry Simeone Chorale
- "White Christmas" originally performed by Bing Crosby
- "Platinum Bells" is a semi-remake of "Silver Bells" originally performed by Bing Crosby and Carol Richards
- "This Christmas" originally performed by Donny Hathaway
- "Opera of the Bells" is a remake of "Carol of the Bells" originally by Ukrainian composer Mykola Leontovych with lyrics by Peter J. Wilhousky.

== Personnel ==
- Destiny's Child - vocals performed by (tracks 1–3, 5, 7–8, 10–12)
- Asif Ali - recording engineer (track 5)
- Pablo Arraya - recording engineer (track 6)
- Beyoncé - group member (tracks 1–5, 7–8, 10–12), musical arrangement (4), vocals (performed by) (4)
- Derrick Coleman - additional background vocals (sung by) (track 9)
- Dylan Dresdow - recording engineer (track 9)
- Alan Floyd - musical arrangement (track 6)
- David Guerrero - assistant audio mixing (tracks 1, 4–10, 12)
- Jaime Guidewicz - assistant recording engineer (track 6)
- James Hoover - recording engineer (tracks 2–3)
- Solange Knowles - guest vocals (performed by) (track 5)
- Tony Maserati - audio mixing (tracks 2–3, 11)
- Errol "Poppi" McCalla - music programming
- Bill Meyers - string arrangements, string conductor
- Michael Morales - acoustic guitar (track 4)
- Ramon Morales - recording engineer (tracks 11–12)
- Tom Morris - recording engineer (tracks 7–8)
- John Naslen - recording engineer (track 1)
- Flip Osman - assistant audio mixing (tracks 2–3, 11)
- Dave "Hard Drive" Pensado - audio mixing (tracks 1, 4–10, 12)
- Marius Perron - recording engineer (track 4)
- Juan Ramirez - assistant recording engineer (track 5)
- Sharay Reed - bass guitar (track 9)
- Byron Rickerson - recording engineer (track 9)
- Frank Romano - guitar (track 3)
- Kelly Rowland - group member (tracks 1–3, 5–8, 10–12), vocals (6)
- Motonori Sasaki - assistant recording engineer (track 11)
- Stephen Stephanie - assistant recording engineer (track 1)
- Larry Strum - recording engineer (track 9)
- Brian Summer - assistant recording engineer (track 9)
- David Swope - recording engineer (track 6)
- Tucker Allen - recording engineer (track 9)
- Kevin Turner - acoustic guitar (track 9)
- Robert Valdez - assistant recording engineer (track 7–8)
- Michelle Williams - group member (tracks 1–3, 5, 7–12), lead vocals (9)
- Quincy S. Jackson - Marketing

== Charts ==
=== Weekly charts ===
Weekly chart performance for 8 Days of Christmas
Chart (2001–02)	Peak position
Australian Albums (ARIA)	65
Australian Urban Albums (ARIA)	10
Austrian Albums (Ö3 Austria)	60
Canadian Albums (Nielsen SoundScan)	34
Canadian R&B Albums (Nielsen SoundScan)	6
Dutch Albums (Album Top 100)	24
French Albums (SNEP)	134
German Albums (Offizielle Top 100)	80
Japanese Albums (Oricon)	20
UK Albums (OCC)	117
UK R&B Albums (Official Charts)	19
US Billboard 200	34
US Top R&B/Hip-Hop Albums (Billboard)	27
US Holiday Albums (Billboard)	3

=== Year-end charts ===
Year-end chart performance for 8 Days of Christmas
Chart (2002)	Position
Canadian R&B Albums (Nielsen SoundScan)	158

== Certifications ==
Region	Certification	Certified units/sales
Canada (Music Canada)	Gold	50,000^{^}
United States (RIAA)	Platinum	1,000,000^{‡}
^{^} Shipments figures based on certification alone.^{‡} Sales+streaming figures based on certification alone.

== Release history ==
Region	Date	Format
United States	October 30, 2001	CD
Australia	November 11, 2001	CD
Europe	November 12, 2001	CD
United States	October 18, 2005	DualDisc
