= List of songs recorded by Keyshia Cole =

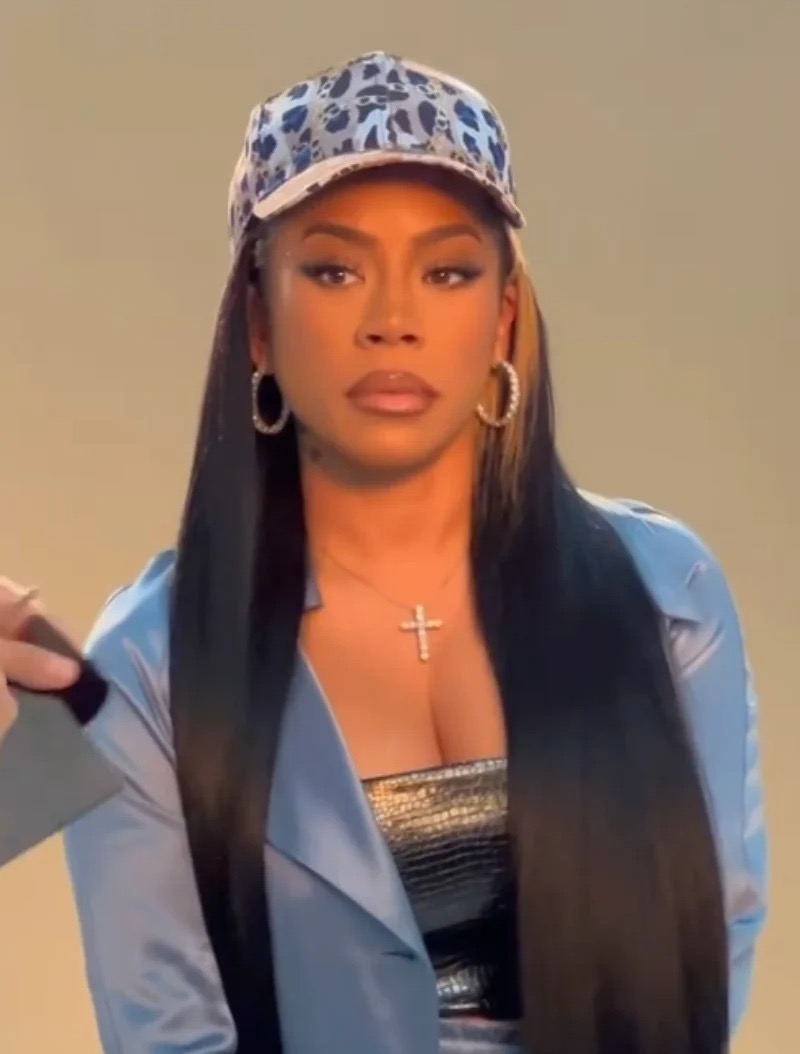
Cole in 2022.

American singer and songwriter Keyshia Cole has recorded material for her seven studio albums and collaborated with other artists on duets, featured appearances, and other recordings. After signing with A&M Records in 2002, Cole began recording her debut studio album, The Way It Is (2005). She co-wrote most of the album's songs and worked with producers and songwriters including Ron Fair, Kerry "Krucial" Brothers, Sean Garrett, Polow da Don, Damon Elliott, Chink Santana, and Kanye West. West and John Legend received co-writing credits on "I Changed My Mind", while Alicia Keys and Brothers received writing credits alongside Cole and Taniesha Smith on "(I Just Want It) To Be Over". Cole also co-wrote "Love" with Greg Curtis. By contrast, "I Should Have Cheated" was written by Daron Jones and Quinnes "Q" Parker of 112. The album also features guest appearances from Jadakiss, Santana, Metro City, and Eve.

Cole worked with a wider range of producers and songwriters on her second album, Just like You (2007), including Missy Elliott, Bryan-Michael Cox, Scott Storch, Rodney Jerkins, The Runners, J. Wells, Pete Rock, and Soulshock & Karlin. Elliott and Lil' Kim, both of whom appear on "Let It Go", also received co-writing credits on the song alongside Cole, Jack Knight, Cainon Lamb, and James Mtume. Cole also collaborated with Tim Kelley and Marcus White on the writing of "I Remember", while "Fallin' Out" credits Cole alongside Carsten Schack and Kenneth Karlin of Soulshock & Karlin and Tammie L. Harris. The song "Was It Worth It?" also credits Cox, Adonis Shropshire, and Kendrick Dean as writers. The album featured guest appearances from Elliott, Lil' Kim, Too Short, Amina Harris, Anthony Hamilton, Young Dro, T.I., Santana, and Piper. For her third album, A Different Me (2008), Cole reunited with Fair and Toxic while also working with producers including Polow da Don, The Runners, Kwamé, Carvin & Ivan, Tank, Poke & Tone, and Theron "Neff-U" Feemster. Feemster co-wrote "You Complete Me" with Cole and shared writing credits with her and Fair on "Erotic". Other notable songwriting credits on the album include Ester Dean, Polow da Don, Ike Turner, and Tina Turner on "Make Me Over"; Nas on "Oh-Oh, Yeah-Yea"; and Tupac Shakur, Carvin Haggins, and Ivan Barias on "Playa Cardz Right", which features posthumous vocals from Shakur. "This Is Us" also credits Evan "Kidd" Bogart, Victoria Horn, and Jason Miller alongside Cole. The album's guest appearances included Harris, Nas, Monica, and 2Pac.

Cole served as an executive producer on her fourth album, Calling All Hearts (2010), and continued her collaboration with Fair, who served as an executive producer, producer, and vocal producer on the project. The album's songwriting credits include those of Diane Warren, who wrote "Better Me", and Nicki Minaj, who co-wrote "I Ain't Thru" with Cole and Russell Gonzalez while appearing as a featured vocalist. The song "If I Fall in Love Again" credits Burt Bacharach and Hal David alongside Cole and other writers, while "Last Hangover" credits Timbaland, Jerome "J-Roc" Harmon, Candice Nelson, and Jim Beanz among its songwriters. The album also featured appearances from Faith Evans, Tank, Timbaland, and Cole's mother, Yvonne Cole. Her fifth album, Woman to Woman (2012), was recorded with producers including Darhyl "DJ" Camper, Harmony Samuels, Rodney Jerkins, T-Minus, Vidal Davis, and Wonda, while Cole enlisted songwriters including Elijah Blake and Jessy Wilson. The single "Enough of No Love" credits Cole, Lil Wayne, Samuels, and Blake, who is credited as his real name Sean Fenton in the album's liner notes. Blake continued his songwriting collaboration with Cole on "I Choose You", co-written with Jack Splash and Lundon Knighten, and "Wonderland", which also credits Duplessis, Guordan Banks, and Wilson among its writers. Other notable credits include Darhyl Camper, Banks, and Wilson on "Trust and Believe"; Meek Mill and Melanie Fiona on "Zero"; and Ashanti and Betty Wright on the album's title track. The album features guest appearances from Lil Wayne, Meek Mill, Ashanti, Blake, and Robin Thicke.

For her sixth album, Point of No Return (2014), Cole worked with producers including Mike Will Made It, DJ Mustard, Stargate, Troy Taylor, and Symbolyc One. Its songwriting credits include Ester Dean and Stargate members Mikkel Storleer Eriksen and Tor Erik Hermansen, who wrote "Believer" with Jasper Cameron. The song "N.L.U", featuring 2 Chainz, credits Chainz, R. Kelly, S1, M-Phazes, and Blake, while "Rick James" credits featured artist Juicy J, Blake, Taylor Parks, and Roahn Hylton among its co-writers. "New Nu" also credits Mike Will Made It and R. City members Theron and Timothy Thomas alongside Cole. Guest appearances on the album include 2 Chainz, Juicy J, Wale, August Alsina, Evans, and Future.

Following her departure from Interscope Records, Cole signed with Epic Records and recorded her seventh studio album, 11:11 Reset (2017). The album continued her work with a range of producers, including Danja, DJ Mustard, Amadeus, Chink Santana, Damon Thomas, Drumma Boy, Eric Hudson, and Patrick "Guitarboy" Hayes, while Cole also received executive producer and production credits. Blake, again credited as Sean Fenton, continued his songwriting collaboration with Cole on songs including "Act Right", which also credits featured performer Young Thug as a co-writer, and "Incapable", whose writing credits also include Danja, Marcella Araica, and Hayes. The song "You", featuring Remy Ma and French Montana, credits Gary Kemp, Harmony Samuels, R. City members Theron and Timothy Thomas, and Attrell Cordes among its writers. "Vault" also credits Jeremih and BongoByTheWay alongside Cole. The album features guest appearances from DJ Khaled, Remy Ma, French Montana, Kamaiyah, and Young Thug.

== Released songs ==
Key
†	Indicates single release
#	Indicates promotional single release

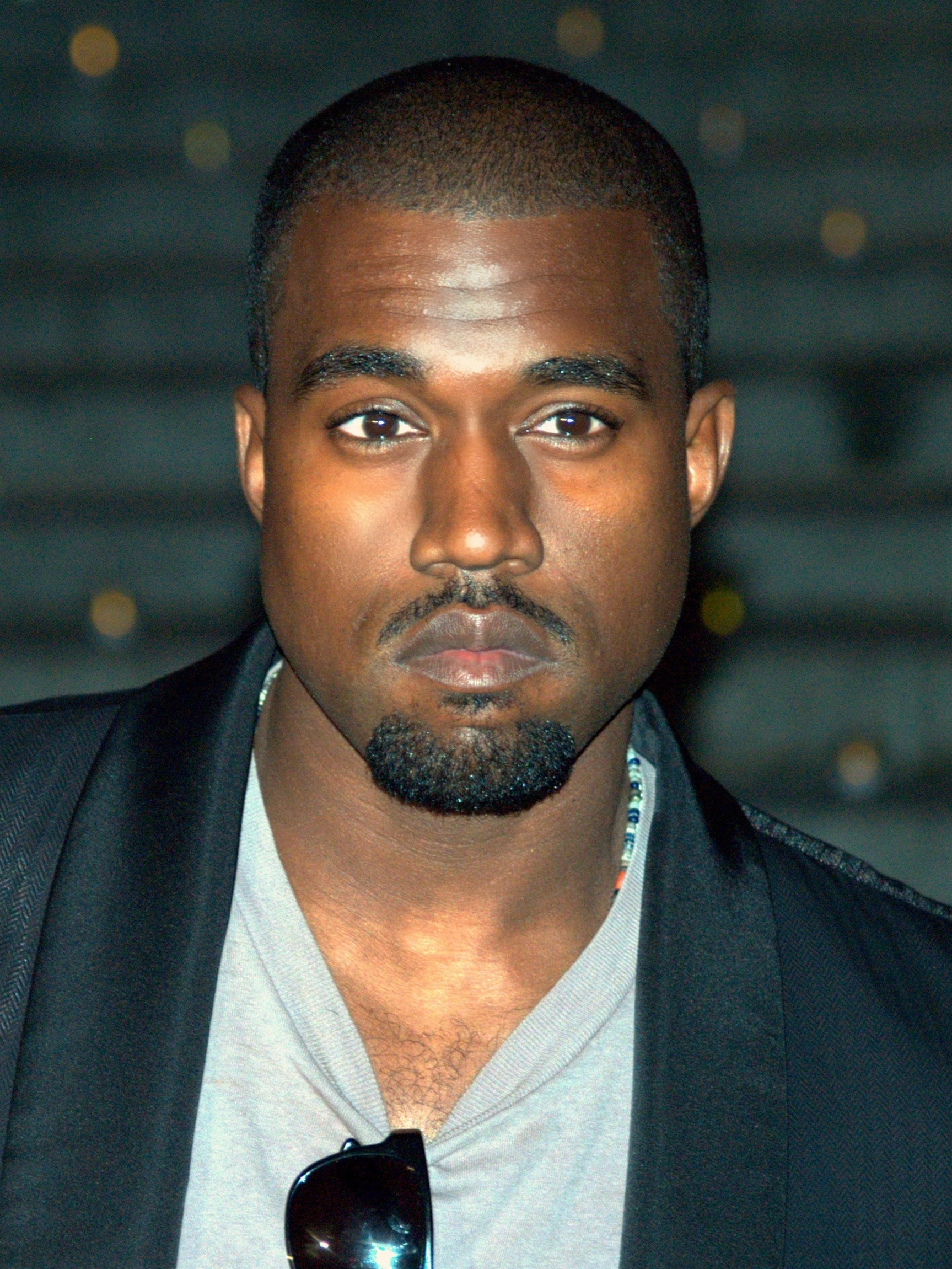
Kanye West co-wrote the song "I Changed My Mind" and contributed backing vocals.

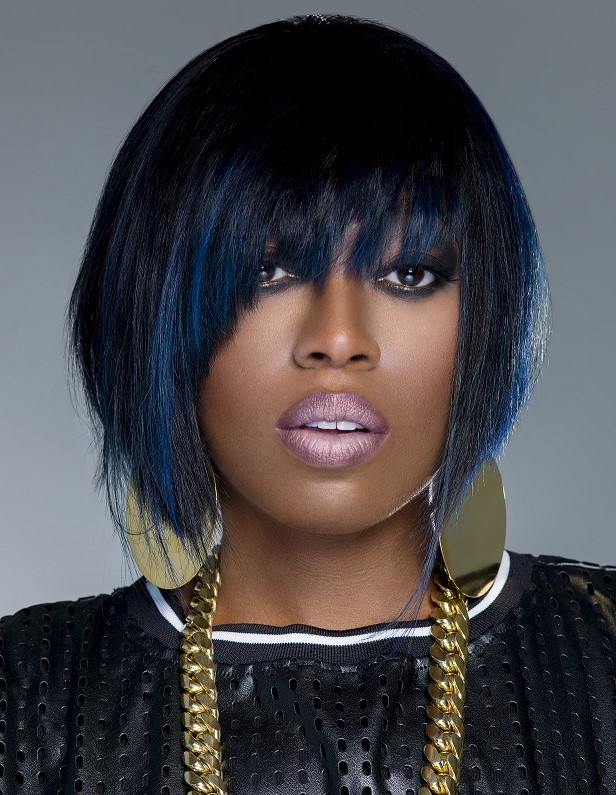
Missy Elliott co-wrote "Let It Go", on which she appears as a featured vocalist.

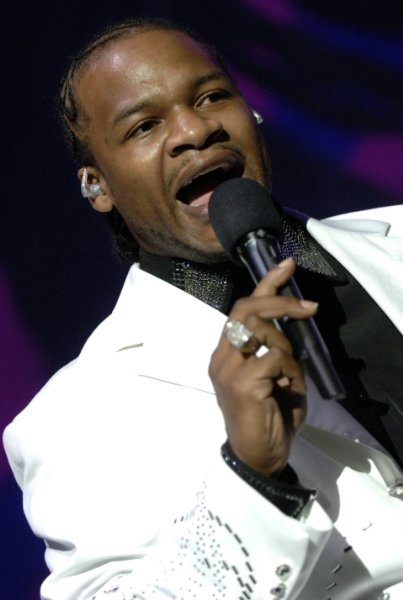
Jaheim wrote the duet "I've Changed", for which Cole contributed vocals.

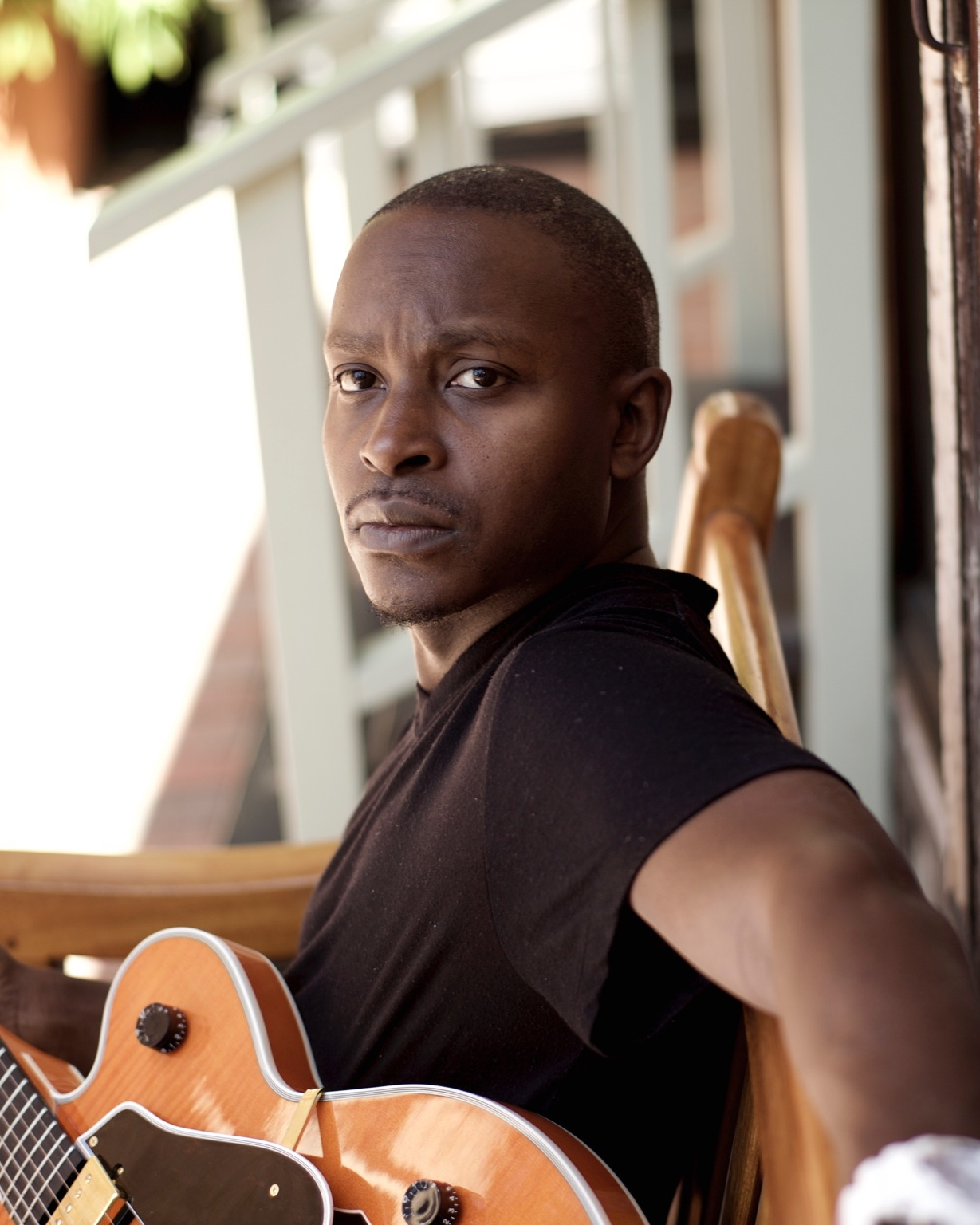
Theron "Neff-U" Feemster co-wrote "Erotic" and "You Complete Me" on the A Different Me album.

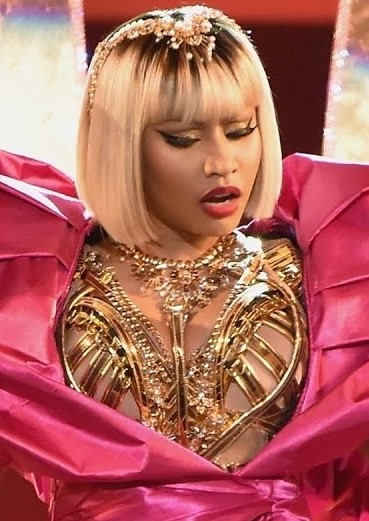
Nicki Minaj co-wrote "I Ain't Thru", on which she appears as a featured vocalist.

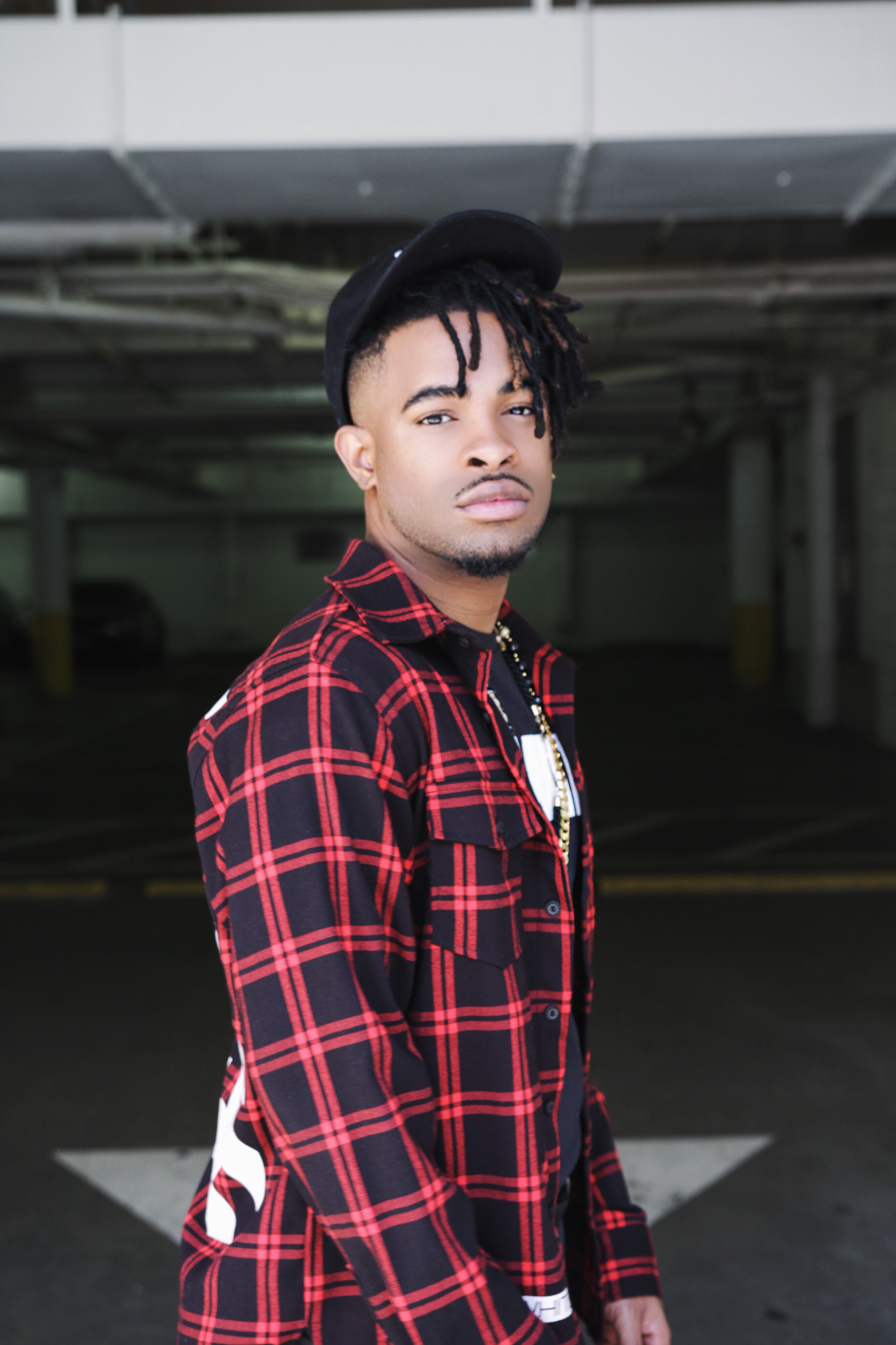
Elijah Blake co-wrote several of Cole's songs since her album, Woman to Woman, including the singles "Enough of No Love" and "Incapable".

List of songs recorded by Keyshia Cole
Song	Artist(s)	Writer(s)	Album(s)	Year	Ref.
"#1 Fan"	Plies featuring Keyshia Cole and J. Holiday	Algernod Washington; Keyshia Cole; Nahum Grymes; Johnny Mollings; Lenny Mollings; Kevin Cossom	Definition of Real	2008	
"Act Right"	Keyshia Cole featuring Young Thug	Keyshia Cole; Jeffery Williams; Sean Fenton; Kevin Randolph; John Jaylien Wesley	11:11 Reset	2017	
"A Different Me" (Intro)	Keyshia Cole	Keyshia Cole; Ramon Owen	A Different Me	2008	
"A Different Me " (Outro)	Keyshia Cole	Keyshia Cole; Ramon Owen	A Different Me	2008	
"All Around the World"	Mistah F.A.B. featuring Keyshia Cole and Silk-E	Stanley Cox; Keyshia Cole; Erica Reynolds; The Mekanix	Son of a Pimp Part 2	2016	
"All Me" †	Kehlani featuring Keyshia Cole	Kehlani Parrish; Keyshia Cole	Non-album release	2019	
"Alone"	Tristan Rice featuring Keyshia Cole	Tristan Rice; Keyshia Cole; Devon Nico	Another Year Without Friends	2021	
"Baby"	Keyshia Cole	—N/a	Team Invasion Presents Keyshia Cole	2005	
"Bad Bad Bad"	Gucci Mane featuring Keyshia Cole	Radric Davis; Keyshia Cole; LaDamon Douglas; Sean Garrett	The State vs. Radric Davis	2009	
"Bad Liar" (Remix) #	Elijah Blake featuring Keyshia Cole	Sean Fenton	The Neon Eon	2021	
"Beautiful Music"	Keyshia Cole	Keyshia Cole; Jean-Claude Oliver; Samuel Barnes; Alexander Mosely	A Different Me	2008	
"Believer"	Keyshia Cole	Ester Dean; Jasper Cameron; Mikkel Storleer Eriksen; Tor Erik Hermansen	Point of No Return	2014	
"Be Somebody"	Dre featuring Keyshia Cole	Andre Lyon	Non-album release	2006	
"Best Friend"	Keyshia Cole	Keyshia Cole; Antwan Thompson; Aaron Rogers; Rashad Johnson; Gavyn Rhone	11:11 Reset	2017	
"Best Friend"	R. Kelly featuring Keyshia Cole and Polow da Don	Robert Kelly; Jamal Jones	Double Up	2007	
"Better Me"	Keyshia Cole	Diane Warren	Calling All Hearts	2010	
"Black Heaven"	Boosie Badazz featuring Keyshia Cole and J. Cole	Torrence Hatch Jr. Keyshia Cole; Jermaine Cole	Touch Down 2 Cause Hell	2015	
"Boyfriend/Girlfriend" (Remix) †	C-Side featuring Keyshia Cole	Bo-Q; Kenny Kold; Joe Gator; Flaire Jones; Marvelous J	Non-album release	2008	
"Brand New"	Keyshia Cole	Keyshia Cole; D'ana Lewis; David Foreman, Jr.	A Different Me	2008	
"Can't Stand It"	Keyshia Cole	—N/a	Team Invasion Presents Keyshia Cole	2005	
"Can't Stay Away"	Faith Evans featuring Keyshia Cole	Faith Evans; Keyshia Cole; Ibrahim Soliman; Ben Briggs III; Toni Coleman	Something About Faith	2010	
"Cole World " (Intro)	Keyshia Cole featuring DJ Khaled	Keyshia Cole; Khaled Khaled; Andre Atkins; Andre Parker; Jerline Shelton; Maurice Commander	11:11 Reset	2017	
"Cole World " (Outro)	Keyshia Cole featuring Too $hort	Keyshia Cole; Todd Shaw; Andre Atkins; Andre Parker; Jerline Shelton; Maurice Commander	11:11 Reset	2017	
"Confused in Love"	Keyshia Cole	Keyshia Cole; Charles Harmon	Calling All Hearts (Deluxe edition)	2010	
"Didn't I Tell You"	Keyshia Cole featuring Too $hort	Keyshia Cole; Todd Shaw; Andrew Harr; Jermaine Jackson	Just like You	2007	
"Don't Leave"	Antonio Brown featuring Keyshia Cole	Antonio Brown; Keyshia Cole	Paradigm	2022	
"Don't Let Me Down"	Hunxho featuring Keyshia Cole	Ibrahim Dodo; Keyshia Cole; Joshua Davis; Luke Leath; Seyvon Broughton	Thank God	2024	
"Don't Waste My Time"	Keyshia Cole featuring Young Thug	Keyshia Cole; Jeffery Williams	Non-album release	2015	
"Do That For (B.A.B.)"	Keyshia Cole	Keyshia Cole; Andre Parker; Imani Halley	Point of No Return (Deluxe edition)	2014	
"Down and Dirty"	Keyshia Cole	Keyshia Cole; Gregory Curtis; Damon Elliott	The Way It Is	2005	
"Dreamin'" †	Young Jeezy featuring Keyshia Cole	Jay Jenkins; Keyshia Cole; Andrew Harr; Bill Summers; Claytoven Richardson; Jermaine Jackson; Larry Batiste	Thug Motivation 102: The Inspiration	2006	
"Emotional"	Keyshia Cole	Keyshia Cole; Damon Thomas; Eric Dawkins; Orlando Williamson	11:11 Reset	2017	
"Enough of No Love" †	Keyshia Cole featuring Lil Wayne	Keyshia Cole; Dwayne Carter; Harmony Samuels; Sean Fenton	Woman to Woman	2012	
"Erotic"	Keyshia Cole	Keyshia Cole; Theron Feemster; Ron Fair	A Different Me	2008	
"Every Little Thing"	Elijah Blake featuring Keyshia Cole	Carly Pearce; Emily Shackelton; Ryan Busbee	Elijah (Deluxe edition)	2024	
"Fallin' Out"	Keyshia Cole	Keyshia Cole; Carsten Schack; Kenneth Karlin; Tammie L. Harris	Just like You	2007	
"Forever"	Keyshia Cole	Tyler Williams; Ester Dean; Clifford Harris	Woman to Woman (Deluxe edition)	2012	
"Forever Is a Thing" †	Keyshia Cole	Keyshia Cole	Non-album release	2023	
"Game's Pain" †	The Game featuring Keyshia Cole	Jayceon Taylor; Keyshia Cole; Jerome Foster; Dahoud Darien; Ervin Pope; Grenique Harper	LAX	2008	
"Get It Right"	Keyshia Cole	Keyshia Cole; Melvin Hough II; Rivelino Wouter; Guordan Banks; Jessyca Wilson; Elite Noel	Woman to Woman	2012	
"Get Up"	Keyshia Cole	Keyshia Cole; Damon Elliott; Mýa Harrison	Biker Boyz: Music from the Motion Picture	2003	
"Get Your Money Up"	Keri Hilson featuring Keyshia Cole and Trina	Keri Hilson; Jamal Jones; Earl Hayes	In a Perfect World...	2009	
"Give Me More"	Keyshia Cole	Keyshia Cole; Scott Storch	Just like You	2007	
"Ghetto Child"	Nutt-So featuring Keyshia Cole, Too $hort and E-40	—N/a	Non-album release	2015	
"Got to Get My Heart Back"	Keyshia Cole	Keyshia Cole; Gene McFadden; John Whitehead; Victor Carstarphen	Just like You	2007	
"Guess What"	Keyshia Cole featuring Jadakiss	Jason Phillips; Sean Garrett; Alexandre Da Veiga	The Way It Is	2005	
"Have Yourself a Merry Little Christmas" #	Keyshia Cole	Hugh Martin; Ralph Blane	Non-album release	2008	
"Happily Never After"	G.No featuring Keyshia Cole	Marc Fanelli-Isla	Latin R&B King	2021	
"Heat of Passion"	Keyshia Cole	Keyshia Cole; Antwan Thompson; Jerrol Wizzard; Troy Taylor	Point of No Return	2014	
"Heaven Sent" †	Keyshia Cole	Keyshia Cole; Alex Francis; Jason Farmer	Just like You	2007	
"Here We Go"	Keyshia Cole	Keyshia Cole; Sean Fenton; Jeanette Shakoor; Deondre Collins; Ernest Wilson	Woman to Woman (iTunes Store deluxe edition)	2012	
"Hey Sexy"	Keyshia Cole	Keyshia Cole; Terius Nash; Carlos McKinney	Woman to Woman	2012	
"Hit or Nah" (Remix) #	Rayven Justice featuring Keyshia Cole and French Montana	Rayven Justice; Keyshia Cole; Karim Kharbouch	Non-album release	2015	
"Hotline Bling" (Remix)	Keyshia Cole	Keyshia Cole; Aubrey Graham; Paul Jefferies; Timmy Thomas	Non-album release	2015	
"I Ain't Thru" †	Keyshia Cole featuring Nicki Minaj	Keyshia Cole; Onika Maraj; Russell Gonzalez	Calling All Hearts	2010	
"I Can't Make You Love Me"	Keyshia Cole	Betty Wright; Greg Curtis	Woman to Woman	2012	
"I Changed My Mind" †	Keyshia Cole	Keyshia Cole; Kanye West; John Legend	The Way It Is	2004	
"I Choose You" †	Keyshia Cole	Keyshia Cole; Jack Splash; Elijah Blake; Lundon Knighten	Woman to Woman	2012	
"I Don't Wanna Be in Love" †	Keyshia Cole	Keyshia Cole; Brian Bates	Non-album release	2021	
"If I Fall in Love Again"	Keyshia Cole featuring Faith Evans	Keyshia Cole; Wytony Dillon; Mario Myers; Osten Harvey; Christopher Wallace; Burt Bacharach; Hal David	Calling All Hearts	2010	
"I Got a Thang for You" †	Trina featuring Keyshia Cole	Katrina Taylor; Keyshia Cole; Johnny Hernandez; Greg Oree; Reginald Saunders	Still da Baddest	2008	
"(I Just Want It) To Be Over" †	Keyshia Cole	Keyshia Cole; Kerry Brothers Jr. Alicia Keys; Taniesha Smith	The Way It Is	2005	
"I'm Coming Out"	Keyshia Cole featuring Iggy Azalea	Bernard Edwards; Nile Rodgers	The Other Woman	2014	
"Impossible" †	Kanye West featuring Twista, Keyshia Cole and BJ	Kanye West; Bryan James Sledge; Carl Terrell Mitchell; Keyshia Cole; Sid Wayne; Armando Manzanero	Non-album release	2006	
"Incapable" †	Keyshia Cole	Keyshia Cole; Gabrielle Nowee; Marcella Araica; Sean Fenton	11:11 Reset	2017	
"Intro (Last Tango)"	Keyshia Cole	Keyshia Cole; Tim Kelley; Marcus White	Point of No Return	2014	
"I Remember" †	Keyshia Cole	Keyshia Cole; Tim Kelley; Marcus White	Just like You	2007	
"I Should Have Cheated" †	Keyshia Cole	Daron Jones; Quinnes "Q" Parker	The Way It Is	2005	
"I Swear"	Keyshia Cole	—N/a	Team Invasion Presents Keyshia Cole	2005	
"I've Changed" †	Jaheim featuring Keyshia Cole	Jaheim Hoagland; Keyshia Cole; Frankie Storm; Kay Gee; Brian Coleman; Harold Johnson; Balewa Muhammad	The Makings of a Man	2007	
"Just like You"	Keyshia Cole	Keyshia Cole; Shawn Carroll	Just like You	2007	
"Just Stand Up!" †	Various artists	Kenneth "Babyface" Edmonds; Ronnie Walton	Charity record	2008	
"Last Hangover"	Keyshia Cole	Keyshia Cole; Timothy Mosely; Jerome Harmon; Candice Nelson; Tim Clayton; Jim Beanz	Calling All Hearts	2010	
"Last Night" †	P. Diddy featuring Keyshia Cole	Sean Combs; Keyshia Cole; Jack Knight; Mario Winans; Shannon Lawrence	Press Play and Just like You	2006	
"Legendary" †	DJ Khaled featuring Chris Brown, Keyshia Cole and Ne-Yo	Khaled Khaled; Christopher Brown; Keyshia Cole; Shaffer Smith; Lundon Knighten; Johnny Mollings; Lenny Mollings; Christopher Whitacre; Justin Henderson; Gary Carolla	We the Best Forever	2011	
"Let It Go" †	Keyshia Cole featuring Missy Elliott and Lil' Kim	Keyshia Cole; Melissa Elliott; Kimberly Jones; Jack Knight; Cainon Lamb; James Mtume	Just like You	2007	
"Long Way Down" #	Keyshia Cole	Keyshia Cole; Erik Ortiz; Kevin Crowe; Sly Jordan	Calling All Hearts	2010	
"Losing You"	Keyshia Cole featuring Anthony Hamilton	Keyshia Cole; Charles Jackson; Frederick Taylor; Jesse Dixon; Marvin Yancy	Just like You	2007	
"Love" †	Keyshia Cole	Keyshia Cole; Greg Curtis	The Way It Is	2005	
"Love, I Thought You Had My Back"	Keyshia Cole	Keyshia Cole; Randolph Murph; Ralph Eskridge; Clarence Johnson Jr; Frederick Taylor	The Way It Is	2005	
"Love Letter"	Keyshia Cole featuring Future	Keyshia Cole; Nayvadius Wilburn; Michael Williams; Marquel Middlebrooks	Point of No Return	2014	
"Love Me Enough"	Nicki Minaj featuring Monica and Keyshia Cole	Onika Maraj; Justin Tranter; Victoria Monét; Shane Lindstrom; Charlie Handsome; Joseph L'Étranger; Derrick Milano	Pink Friday 2	2023	
"Love You Better"	Keith Sweat featuring Keyshia Cole	Keith Sweat	Why Did I Get Married? and Just Me	2007	
"Loyal" (Remix)	Keyshia Cole featuring Sean Kingston and Lil Wayne	Keyshia Cole; Kisean Anderson; Dwayne Carter; Christopher Brown; Tyrone Griffin, Jr. Nicholas Balding; Mark Kragen; Bobby Brackins; Stanley Cox; Omololu Akinlolu; Mason Betha; Sean Combs; Christopher Wallace; Todd Shaw; Asha Puthli; Deric Angelettie; Jermaine Mauldin; Shawn Carter	Non-album release	2014	
"Make Me Over"	Keyshia Cole	Keyshia Cole; Ester Dean; Polow da Don; Ike Turner; Tina Turner	A Different Me	2008	
"Mama"	Ghostface Killah featuring Keyshia Cole	Dennis Coles; Keyshia Cole	Hidden Darts: Special Edition	2007	
"Missing Me"	Keyshia Cole	Keyshia Cole; Eric Hudson; Sean Fenton	Woman to Woman	2012	
"Momma"	Keyshia Cole	—N/a	Team Invasion Presents Keyshia Cole	2005	
"My Life"	Young Noble and JT the Bigga Figga featuring Keyshia Cole and Polow da Don	Rufus Lee Cooper III; Joseph Tom; Keyshia Cole	Mobb Tales	2003	
"Never" †	Keyshia Cole featuring Eve	Keyshia Cole; Eve Jeffers; Luther Vandross	Barbershop 2: Back in Business and The Way It Is	2004	
"New Nu"	Keyshia Cole	Keyshia Cole; Michael Williams; Marquel Middlebrooks; Nayvadius Wilburn; Timothy Thomas; Theron Thomas	Point of No Return	2014	
"Next Move"	Keyshia Cole featuring Robin Thicke	Keyshia Cole; Roosevelt Harrell; David Balfour; Jessyca Wilson; Guordan Banks	Woman to Woman	2012	
"Next Time (Won't Give My Heart Away)" †	Keyshia Cole	Keyshia Cole; Antwan Thompson; Jerrol Wizzard	Point of No Return	2014	
"N.L.U"	Keyshia Cole featuring 2 Chainz	Keyshia Cole; Tauheed Epps; Sean Fenton; Larry Griffin, Jr. Mark Landon; Robert Kelly	Point of No Return	2014	
"No Complications"	Keyshia Cole	Brandon Bell; Jdoe; Breana Marin	Point of No Return	2014	
"No One"	Keyshia Cole featuring Fat Joe	—N/a	Team Invasion Presents Keyshia Cole	2005	
"No Love Lost"	Keyshia Cole	Justin Timberlake; Ron Fair; Timothy Mosley; Jim Beanz; Federico Vindver; Kirby Lauryen; Larrance Dopson; Nick Brongers	The Color Purple	2023	
"No Other"	Keyshia Cole featuring Amina Harris	Keyshia Cole; Amina Harris; Kwamé Holland; James Poyser; Josh Rivera	A Different Me	2008	
"Nothing to Me"	G-Eazy featuring E-40 and Keyshia Cole	Gerald Earl Gillum; Earl Stevens; Keyshia Cole; Paris Jones; Daniel Johnson; Christoph Andersson; Glenda Proby; Vinay Vyas	When It's Dark Out	2015	
"Nubian Queen" (Remix)	Messy Marv featuring Keyshia Cole and E-40	—N/a	Still Explosive	2001	
"Number One" (Remix)	R. Kelly featuring T-Pain and Keyshia Cole	Robert Kelly; Faheem Najm; Keri Hilson; Ester Dean	Non-album release	2009	
"Oh"	Messy Marv featuring Keyshia Cole	Marvin Watson Jr.	What You Know Bout Me?	2006	
"Oh-Oh, Yeah-Yea"	Keyshia Cole featuring Nas	Keyshia Cole; Nasir Jones; Nikesha Briscoe; Rafael Akinyemi	A Different Me	2008	
"On Demand"	Keyshia Cole featuring Wale and August Alsina	Keyshia Cole; Olubowale Akintimehin; John Webb, Jr. Kevin Spencer; Donald DeGrate; Cedric Hailey	Point of No Return	2014	
"Party Ain't a Party"	Keyshia Cole featuring Gavyn Rhone	Keyshia Cole; Patrick Hayes; Tenisha Younger	Point of No Return	2014	
"Playa Cardz Right" †	Keyshia Cole featuring 2Pac	Keyshia Cole; Tupac Shakur; Johnny Jackson; Carvin Haggins; Ivan Barias; Yafeu Fula; Tyruss Himes; Maurice Harding	Pac's Life and A Different Me	2006	
"Please Don't Stop"	Keyshia Cole	Keyshia Cole; Andrew Harr; Jermaine Jackson; Ron Fair	A Different Me	2008	
"Remember (Part 2)" #	Keyshia Cole	Keyshia Cole Patrick Hayes; Tenisha Younger	Point of No Return	2014	
"Rick James" †	Keyshia Cole featuring Juicy J	Keyshia Cole; Jordan Houston; Breana Marin; Sean Fenton; Roahn Hylton; Brandon Bell; Taylor Parks; Kam Parker	Point of No Return	2014	
"Ride"	Keyshia Cole featuring Kamaiyah	Keyshia Cole; Bruce Washington; Joseph Paquette; Yaki Kadafi; Katari Cox; Michael Ray Stevenson; Rufus Cooper; Tupac Shakur; Tyrone Wrice, Jr.	11:11 Reset	2017	
"Right Time"	Keyshia Cole	Keyshia Cole; Desmond J. Peterson; Sean Fenton; Ronald M. Ferebee, Jr. Sam Hook	11:11 Reset	2017	
"Same Thing" (Interlude)	Keyshia Cole	Keyshia Cole; Cliff Brown; Tony Rey	Just like You	2007	
"She" †	Keyshia Cole	Keyshia Cole; Sean Fenton; Kirby Dockery; Dijon McFarlane; Printz Board	Point of No Return	2014	
"Shoulda Let You Go" †	Keyshia Cole featuring Amina Harris	Keyshia Cole; Rodney Jerkins	Just like You	2007	
"Signature"	Keyshia Cole	Keyshia Cole; Ryan Williamson; Guordan Banks; Jessyca Wilson	Woman to Woman	2012	
"Silent Night"	Keyshia Cole	Franz Xaver Gruber; Joseph Mohr	Non-album release	2005	
"Situations"	Keyshia Cole featuring Chink Santana	Keyshia Cole; Andre Parker; Francesca Richards	The Way It Is	2005	
"So Impossible"	Keyshia Cole	Keyshia Cole; James Harris III; Terry Lewis; Carla Carter	Calling All Hearts	2010	
"Someone"	Masego featuring Keyshia Cole	Masego; Keyshia Cole	Fix Your Face	2026	
"Sometimes"	Keyshia Cole	Keyshia Cole; Justin Graham	Calling All Hearts	2010	
"Soul Sister"	Keyshia Cole featuring Remy Ma	—N/a	Team Invasion Presents Keyshia Cole	2005	
"Stay Down"	Bailey featuring Keyshia Cole	James Bailey; Keyshia Cole	Champ Bailey	2006	
"Stubborn"	Keyshia Cole	Keyshia Cole; Rodney Jerkins; Paul Dawson; Sean Fenton	Woman to Woman	2012	
"Superstar"	Keyshia Cole	Keyshia Cole; George Cole	The Way It Is	2005	
"Take Me Away" †	Keyshia Cole	Keyshia Cole; Teray Jones; Irv Gotti	Calling All Hearts	2010	
"Tease Me"	Troublez featuring Keyshia Cole	Dennis Arnold	Non-album release	2024	
"Tell Me"	Kafani featuring Keyshia Cole and San Quinn	—N/a	The Redemption of Quincy Brooks and Still Fast	2011	
"Thank You"	Keyshia Cole featuring Dr. Yvonne Cole	Keyshia Cole; Edmund Clement; Kharon Clement	Calling All Hearts	2010	
"This Is Us"	Keyshia Cole	Keyshia Cole; Evan Bogart; Victoria Hort; Jason Miller	A Different Me	2008	
"Thought You Should Know"	Keyshia Cole	Keyshia Cole; Lonny Bereal; Thai Jones	A Different Me	2008	
"Tired of Doing Me"	Keyshia Cole featuring Tank	Keyshia Cole; Durrell Babbs; Nathaniel Mave Qahhaar; Frederick Taylor; Jerry Franklin; Bob Newt; J. Valentine; Kris Stephens	Calling All Hearts	2010	
"Tit for Tat"	Rayven Justice featuring Keyshia Cole	Rayven Justice; Keyshia Cole	Do It Justice	2016	
"Trust" †	Keyshia Cole featuring Monica	Keyshia Cole; Frederick Taylor	Just like You (US iTunes Store deluxe edition) and A Different Me	2007	
"Trust and Believe" †	Keyshia Cole	Keyshia Cole; Darhyl Camper; Guordan Banks; Jessyca Wilson	Woman to Woman	2012	
"Trust My Love"	P. Jericho featuring Keyshia Cole	Peter Jericho; Keyshia Cole	Money, Women & Alcohol	2011	
"Try Loving Me"	Keyshia Cole	Dashawn White; David Foreman, Jr. D'ana Lewis	Woman to Woman (deluxe edition)	2012	
"Two Sides to Every Story"	Keyshia Cole	Keyshia Cole; Dontae Winslow	Calling All Hearts (Deluxe edition)	2010	
"Unbothered"	Keyshia Cole	Keyshia Cole; Eric Hudson; Danny Murdock; Denisia Andrews; Brittany Coney; Nazir Assad	11:11 Reset	2017	
"Vault"	Keyshia Cole	Keyshia Cole; Jeremy Felton; Uforo Ebong; Raymond Komba	11:11 Reset	2017	
"Was It Worth It?"	Keyshia Cole	Keyshia Cole; Adonis Shropshire; Bryan-Michael Cox; Kendrick Dean	Just like You	2007	
"We Could Be"	Keyshia Cole	Keyshia Cole; Errol McCalla Jr.	The Way It Is	2005	
"What's Going On"	Remy Ma featuring Keyshia Cole	Reminisce Smith; Claudette Ortiz; Deleno Matthews; Che Harris; Joe Davi	There's Something About Remy: Based on a True Story	2006	
"What You Do to Me"	Keyshia Cole	Keyshia Cole; Andre Parker	Calling All Hearts	2010	
"(When You Gonna) Give It Up to Me"	Sean Paul featuring Keyshia Cole	Sean Henriques; Donovan Bennett; Nigel Staff	Step Up	2006	
"When Will Heaven Call"	Nutt-So featuring Keyshia Cole and Yvonne Cole	—N/a	The Betrayal	1998	
"Where This Love Could End Up"	Keyshia Cole	Keyshia Cole; Jean-Claude Oliver; Samuel Barnes; Russell Gonzalez	A Different Me	2008	
"Where Would I Go"	Keyshia Cole featuring Ghostface Killah	—N/a	Team Invasion Presents Keyshia Cole	2005	
"Where Would We"	Keyshia Cole	Keyshia Cole Antwan Thompson; Jay Beckenstein	Calling All Hearts (Deluxe edition)	2010	
"Who's Gonna Hold Me Down"	Keyshia Cole	Keyshia Cole; Roosevelt Harrell; Guordan Banks; Jessyca Wilson; Isaac Hayes	Woman to Woman (Deluxe edition)	2012	
"Why Lie"	Keyshia Cole	Keyshia Cole; Dru Castro; Uforo Ebong	Woman to Woman (Deluxe edition)	2012	
"Woman to Woman"	Keyshia Cole featuring Ashanti	Keyshia Cole; Ashanti Douglas; Betty Wright; Frederick Taylor; Earl Powell; Walter English III	Woman to Woman	2012	
"Wonder"	Keyshia Cole	Keyshia Cole; Guordan Banks; Jessyca Wilson; Chauncey Hollis	Woman to Woman (Target deluxe edition)	2012	
"Wonderland"	Keyshia Cole featuring Elijah Blake	Keyshia Cole; Sean Fenton; Jerry Duplessis; Guordan Banks; Jessyca Wilson; Arden Altino; Akene Dunkley; Olivier Castelli	Woman to Woman	2012	
"Work It Out"	Keyshia Cole	Keyshia Cole; Chanz Parkman; J. Wells	Just like You	2007	
"You" †	Keyshia Cole featuring Remy Ma and French Montana	Keyshia Cole; Reminisce Mackie; Karim Kharbouch; Harmony Samuels; Edgar Etienne; Gary Kemp; Theron Thomas; Timothy Thomas; Attrell Cordes	11:11 Reset	2017	
"You Complete Me" †	Keyshia Cole	Keyshia Cole; Theron Feemster	A Different Me	2008	
"You've Changed"	Keyshia Cole	Keyshia Cole; Ron Fair; Leonard Huggins; Rich Shelton	The Way It Is	2005	
"Zero"	Keyshia Cole featuring Meek Mill	Keyshia Cole; Robert Williams; Vidal Davis; Tyler Williams; Melanie Fiona; Guordan Banks; Jessyca Wilson	Woman to Woman	2012	

== Unreleased songs ==
List of unreleased songs recorded by Keyshia Cole
Song	Artist(s)	Composer(s)	Intended album	Ref.
"All Inside"	Keyshia Cole	Hitmaka	11:11 Reset	
"Dumb Sh..."	Keyshia Cole	Damon Elliott	The Way It Is	
"Heartbreaker"	Jeremih and Keyshia Cole	—N/a	—N/a	
"Holding Back"	Keyshia Cole featuring Ryan Lovett	—N/a	A Different Me	
"Hold You Down"	The Game and Keyshia Cole	Dr. Dre	Doctor's Advocate	
"I Love You"	Keyshia Cole featuring Lil Wayne	Carvin & Ivan; Ron Fair	A Different Me	
"No More"	Keyshia Cole	—N/a	A Different Me	
"Pusha Man" (Remix)	Bump J featuring Kanye West, Rhymefest, Keyshia Cole and Sly Polaroid	Kanye West	—N/a	
"Real Me/Reel Me"	Keyshia Cole	—N/a	—N/a	
"Say You'll Stay"	Keyshia Cole	—N/a	—N/a	
"Snatch Yo Weave Out"	Keyshia Cole	Damon Elliott	The Way It Is	
"So Alone"	Keyshia Cole	Damon Elliott	The Way It Is	
"Speak to Me"	Keyshia Cole	Swagg R'Celious	11:11 Reset	
"Streets Is a Motha"	Keyshia Cole	Damon Elliott	The Way It Is	
"Talk to Me"	Keyshia Cole featuring Mya	Damon Elliott	The Way It Is	
"Triflin"	Keyshia Cole	Damon Elliott	The Way It Is	

== See also ==
- Keyshia Cole discography
