= Keyshia Cole discography =

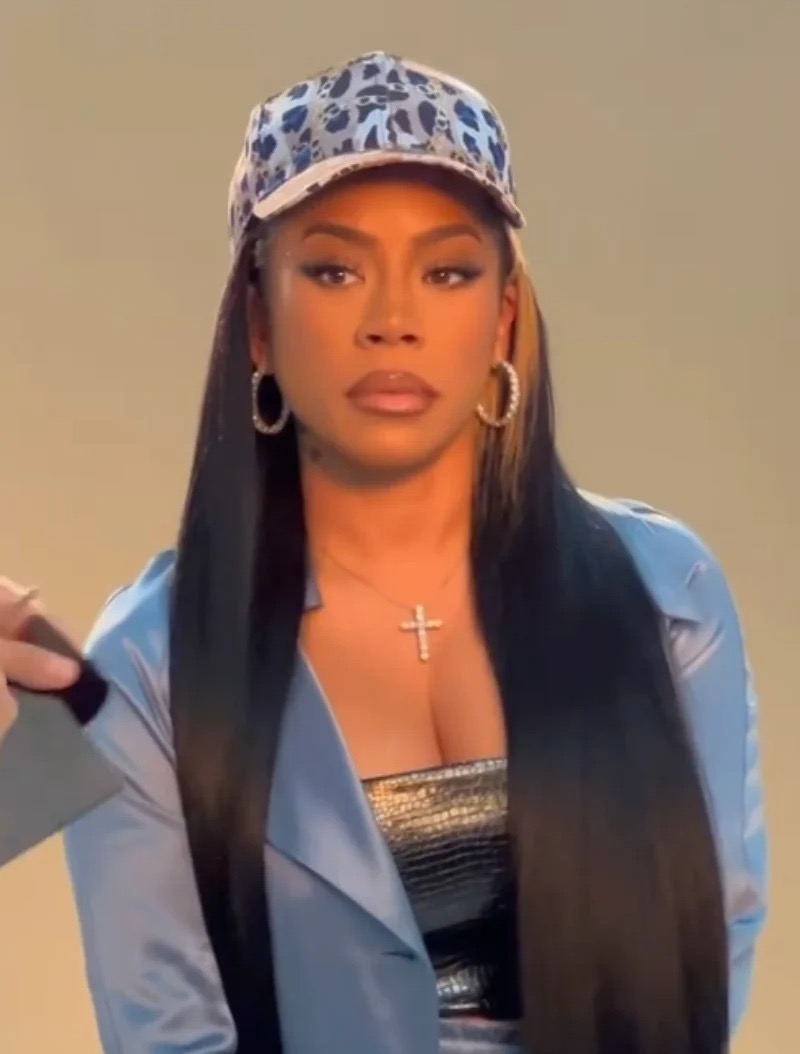
- Cole in 2022
- Studio albums: 7
- Extended plays: 2
- Singles: 35
- Video albums: 3
- Music videos: 39
- Mixtapes: 1
- Promotional singles: 8

American singer Keyshia Cole has released seven studio albums, two extended plays, one mixtape, 24 singles (including 11 as a featured artist) and 39 music videos (including seven as a featured artist). Her recordings—primarily rooted in contemporary R&B and frequently incorporating elements of hip hop and pop—have produced numerous entries on the US Billboard charts, including multiple top-ten placements on the US Billboard R&B/Hip-Hop charts and other rankings. Several of her releases have also received certifications in many countries, including the United States. To date, Cole has sold over 15 million albums worldwide.

Cole's musical career officially began with the 2004 single "Never", which became her first entry on a national chart when it reached number 71 on the US Hot R&B/Hip-Hop Songs chart. Her debut album, The Way It Is, was released on June 21, 2005 through A&M Records. The album entered the US Billboard 200 at number six with first-week sales of 89,000 copies and was later certified platinum by the Recording Industry Association of America (RIAA). In 2006, she was featured on Sean Paul's "(When You Gonna) Give It Up to Me", followed by Diddy's 2007 single "Last Night"; both songs reached the top ten of the US Billboard Hot 100 and charted in the top ten in multiple international territories, later receiving several certifications. Cole's second studio album, Just like You (2007), established her as a commercial mainstay: it debuted at number two on the US Billboard 200 with first-week sales of 281,419 copies and produced the lead single "Let It Go" (featuring Missy Elliott and Lil' Kim), which reached the top ten of the US Billboard Hot 100 and has been certified platinum, while further singles such as "I Remember" and "Heaven Sent" reinforced her prominence on the R&B charts. Her third album, A Different Me (2008), became the pinnacle of her commercial success up to that point—selling 322,000 copies in its first week and earning a platinum certification.

Throughout the 2010s, Cole continued to release full-length records and collaborations. Her fourth studio album, Calling All Hearts (2010), debuted in the top ten of the Billboard 200 with first-week sales of 128,000 copies. It was followed by Woman to Woman (2012), which also opened in the top ten with 96,000 copies sold in its first week and reached number two on the US Top R&B/Hip-Hop Albums chart. The album yielded three singles: "Enough of No Love" (featuring Lil Wayne), which ascended to the Hot 100 and attained a top ten position on the Hot R&B/Hip-Hop Songs chart; followed by "Trust and Believe" and "I Choose You", both of which also made an impact on Billboard's urban charts. Cole followed with Point of No Return (2014), which became another of her releases to top the Top R&B/Hip-Hop Albums chart. Following a brief hiatus and a label move to Epic Records, Cole's seventh studio album, 11:11 Reset (2017), was issued in October 2017 and spawned the singles "You" and "Incapable", both of which reached the top 20 of Billboard's US Hot R&B Songs chart. In subsequent years, Cole released the standalone singles, "I Don't Wanna Be in Love" in 2021, which charted on Billboard's urban radio rankings, and "Forever Is a Thing" in 2023.

== Albums ==
=== Studio albums ===
List of studio albums, with selected chart positions, sales figures and certifications
Title	Album details	Peak chart positions							Certifications
Title	Album details	US	US R&B/ HH	CAN	JPN	KOR (Int.)	UK	UK R&B	Certifications
The Way It Is	Released: June 21, 2005; Label: A&M, Interscope; Formats: CD, vinyl, digital download	6	2	—	—	—	184	17	RIAA: Platinum; RMNZ: Gold
Just like You	Released: September 25, 2007; Label: Imani, Geffen, Interscope; Formats: CD, digital download	2	1	49	34	—	149	14	RIAA: Platinum; BPI: Silver; RMNZ: Gold
A Different Me	Released: December 16, 2008; Label: Imani, Geffen, Interscope; Formats: CD, digital download	2	1	—	62	—	—	—	RIAA: Platinum
Calling All Hearts	Released: December 21, 2010; Label: Geffen, Interscope; Formats: CD, digital download	9	5	—	—	64	—	—	
Woman to Woman	Released: November 19, 2012; Label: Geffen, Interscope; Formats: CD, digital download	10	2	—	—	85	— (Note: Woman to Woman did not enter the UK Albums Chart, but peaked at number 85 on the UK Album Downloads Chart.)	27	
Point of No Return	Released: October 7, 2014; Label: Interscope; Formats: CD, digital download	9	1	—	—	—	—	—	
11:11 Reset	Released: October 20, 2017; Label: Epic, Sony; Formats: CD, digital download	37	20	—	—	—	—	36	
"—" denotes a recording that did not chart or was not released in that territory.

=== Mixtapes ===
List of mixtapes, with selected details
Title	Details
Team Invasion Presents Keyshia Cole	Released: February 26, 2005; Label: Self-released; Formats: CD, digital download

== Extended plays ==
List of extended plays, with selected details
Title	Details
Sessions@AOL	Released: July 26, 2005; Label: A&M; Format: Digital download
Live from the Village	Released: December 13, 2005; Label: A&M; Format: Digital download

== Singles ==
=== As lead artist ===
List of singles, with selected chart positions, showing year released and album name
Title	Year	Peak chart positions										Certifications	Album
Title	Year	US	US R&B/ HH	US Adult R&B	CAN	GER	IRE	KOR (Int.)	NL Urban	UK	UK R&B	Certifications	Album
"Never" (featuring Eve)	2004	—	71	—	—	—	—	—	—	—	—		The Way It Is
"I Changed My Mind"	2004	71	23	—	—	—	—	—	—	48	9		The Way It Is
"(I Just Want It) To Be Over"	2005	— (Note: "(I Just Want It) To Be Over" did not enter the Billboard Hot 100 but peaked at number one on the Bubbling Under Hot 100 chart, which acts as an extension to the Hot 100.)	30	—	—	—	—	—	18	—	—		The Way It Is
"I Should Have Cheated"	2005	30	4	26	—	—	43	—	25	48	9		The Way It Is
"Love"	2006	19	3	15	—	—	—	71	23	—	—	RIAA: Platinum; BPI: Gold; RMNZ: 3× Platinum	The Way It Is
"Let It Go" (featuring Missy Elliott and Lil' Kim)	2007	7	1	27	39	72	—	—	3	—	—	RIAA: Platinum; BPI: Silver; RMNZ: Platinum	Just like You
"Shoulda Let You Go" (featuring Amina)	2007	41	6	30	—	— (Note: "Shoulda Let You Go" did not enter the Official German Charts, but peaked at number 15 on the Deutsche Urban Charts.)	—	—	37	—	—		Just like You
"I Remember"	2007	24	1	1	—	—	—	—	34	—	—		Just like You
"Heaven Sent"	2008	28	1	1	—	—	—	—	—	—	—		Just like You
"Playa Cardz Right" (with 2Pac)	2008	63	9	11	—	—	—	—	26	—	—		A Different Me
"You Complete Me"	2009	62	7	18	—	—	—	—	49	—	—		A Different Me
"Trust" (with Monica)	2009	70	5	19	—	—	—	—	27	—	—		A Different Me
"I Ain't Thru" (featuring Nicki Minaj)	2010	— (Note: "I Ain't Thru" did not enter the Billboard Hot 100, but peaked at number 19 on the Bubbling Under Hot 100 chart.)	54	—	—	—	—	—	28	—	—		Calling All Hearts
"Take Me Away"	2011	— (Note: "Take Me Away" did not enter the Billboard Hot 100, but peaked at number 20 on the Bubbling Under Hot 100 chart.)	27	—	—	—	—	—	32	—	—		Calling All Hearts
"Enough of No Love" (featuring Lil Wayne)	2012	84	7	32	—	—	—	19	43	—	—		Woman to Woman
"Trust and Believe"	2012	— (Note: "Trust and Believe" did not enter the Billboard Hot 100, but peaked at number two on the Bubbling Under Hot 100 chart.)	32	12	—	—	—	43	23	—	—		Woman to Woman
"I Choose You"	2013	—	—	18	—	—	—	—	17	—	—		Woman to Woman
"Next Time (Won't Give My Heart Away)"	2014	—	—	—	—	—	—	—	—	—	—		Point of No Return
"Rick James" (featuring Juicy J)	2014	—	—	—	—	—	—	—	—	—	—		Point of No Return
"She"	2014	—	—	—	—	—	—	65	—	—	—		Point of No Return
"You" (featuring Remy Ma and French Montana)	2017	—	— (Note: "You" did not enter the Hot R&B/Hip-Hop Songs chart, but peaked at number eight on the Bubbling Under R&B/Hip-Hop Songs chart.)	—	—	—	—	—	—	—	—		11:11 Reset
"Incapable"	2017	—	50^{1}	19	—	—	—	—	—	—	—		11:11 Reset
"I Don't Wanna Be in Love"	2021	—	43^{1}	11	—	—	—	—	—	—	—		Non-album singles
"Forever Is a Thing"	2023	—	—	—	—	—	—	—	—	—	—		Non-album singles
"—" denotes a recording that did not chart or was not released in that territory.^{1} denotes a peak on the R&B/Hip-Hop Airplay chart.

=== As featured artist ===
List of singles, with selected chart positions, showing year released and album name
Title	Year	Peak chart positions								Certifications	Album
Title	Year	US	US R&B/ HH	AUS	CAN	GER	IRE	SWI	UK	Certifications	Album
"Impossible" (Kanye West featuring Keyshia Cole, Twista and BJ)	2006	— (Note: "Impossible" did not enter the Billboard Hot 100, but peaked at number 3 on the Bubbling Under Hot 100 chart.)	54	—	—	—	—	—	—		Mission: Impossible III
"(When You Gonna) Give It Up to Me" (Sean Paul featuring Keyshia Cole)	2006	3	5	17	9	26	23	5	24	RIAA: Gold; BPI: Platinum; MC: Platinum; RMNZ: Platinum	The Trinity
"Last Night" (Diddy featuring Keyshia Cole)	2007	10	7	53	23	25	9	33	14	BPI: Silver; RMNZ: Gold	Press Play
"Dreamin'" (Young Jeezy featuring Keyshia Cole)	2007	—	65	—	—	—	—	—	—		The Inspiration
"I Got a Thang for You" (Trina featuring Keyshia Cole)	2008	— (Note: "I Got a Thang for You" did not enter the Billboard Hot 100, but peaked at number 21 on the Bubbling Under Hot 100 chart.)	59	—	—	—	—	—	—		Still da Baddest
"Boyfriend/Girlfriend" (Remix) (C-Side featuring Keyshia Cole)	2008	72	— (Note: "Boyfriend/Girlfriend" did not enter the Hot R&B/Hip-Hop Songs chart, but peaked at number 19 on the Hot Rap Songs chart.)	—	—	—	—	—	—		Non-album single
"I've Changed" (Jaheim featuring Keyshia Cole)	2008	—	35	—	—	—	—	—	—		The Makings of a Man
"Game's Pain" (The Game featuring Keyshia Cole)	2008	75	20	—	94	—	—	—	—		LAX
"Just Stand Up!" (with various artists)	2008	11	57	39	10	—	11	—	26	RIAA: 2× Platinum	Non-album single
"Legendary" (DJ Khaled featuring Chris Brown, Keyshia Cole and Ne-Yo)	2011	—	100	—	—	—	—	—	—		We the Best Forever
"All Me" (Kehlani featuring Keyshia Cole)	2019	— (Note: "All Me" did not enter the Billboard Hot 100, but peaked at number 7 on the Bubbling Under Hot 100 chart.)	— (Note: "All Me" did not enter the Hot R&B/Hip-Hop Songs chart, but peaked at number two on the Bubbling Under Hot R&B/Hip-Hop Songs chart.)	—	—	—	—	—	—	RIAA: Gold	Non-album single
"—" denotes a recording that did not chart or was not released in that territory.

=== Promotional singles ===
List of promotional singles, with selected chart positions, showing year released and album name
Title	Year	Peak chart positions		Album
Title	Year	US R&B/ HH	NL Urban	Album
"Have Yourself a Merry Little Christmas"	2008	58	34	Non-album promotional single
"Long Way Down"	2010	91	—	Calling All Hearts
"Remember (Part 2)"	2014	— (Note: Although "Remember (Part 2)" did not enter the Hot R&B/Hip-Hop Songs chart, it peaked at number 28 on the Mediabase US Urban Airplay chart.)	—	Point of No Return
"Don't Waste My Time" (featuring Young Thug)	2015	—	—	Non-album promotional singles
"Hit or Nah" (Remix) (Rayven Justice featuring Keyshia Cole and French Montana)	2015	—	—	Non-album promotional singles
"Best Friend"	2017	—	—	11:11 Reset
"Vault"	2017	—	—	11:11 Reset
"Bad Liar" (Remix) (Elijah Blake featuring Keyshia Cole)	2020	—	—	The Neon Eon
"—" denotes a recording that did not chart.

== Other charted songs ==
List of other charted songs, with selected chart positions, showing year released and album name
Title	Year	Peak chart positions				Album
Title	Year	US R&B/ HH	GER Urban	NL Urban	KOR (Int.)	Album
"Get Up"	2003	—	—	73	—	Biker Boyz: Music from the Motion Picture
"Didn't I Tell You" (featuring Too Short)	2007	— (Note: "Didn't I Tell You" did not enter the Hot R&B/Hip-Hop Songs chart, but peaked at number 17 on the Bubbling Under R&B/Hip-Hop Songs chart.)	—	—	—	Just like You
"Losing You" (featuring Anthony Hamilton)	2007	— (Note: "Losing You" did not enter the Hot R&B/Hip-Hop Songs chart, but peaked at number 19 on the Bubbling Under R&B/Hip-Hop Songs chart.)	—	—	—	Just like You
"Where This Love Could End Up"	2008	79	—	—	—	A Different Me
"Beautiful Music"	2008	95	—	—	—	A Different Me
"Get Your Money Up" (Keri Hilson featuring Keyshia Cole and Trina)	2009	83	—	—	—	In a Perfect World...
"Better Me"	2010	—	—	—	14	Calling All Hearts
"Zero" (featuring Meek Mill)	2012	—	—	57	—	Woman to Woman
"Woman to Woman" (featuring Ashanti)	2012	— (Note: "Woman to Woman" did not enter the Hot R&B/Hip-Hop Songs chart, but peaked at number 24 on the R&B Digital Songs chart.)	—	—	10	Woman to Woman
"Loyal" (Remix) (featuring Lil Wayne and Sean Kingston)	2014	—	11	—	—	—N/a
"Love Me Enough" (Nicki Minaj featuring Monica and Keyshia Cole)	2023	— (Note: "Love Me Enough" did not enter the Hot R&B/Hip-Hop Songs chart, but peaked at number 6 on the R&B/Hip-Hop Digital Songs chart.)	—	—	—	Pink Friday 2
"No Love Lost"	2023	— (Note: "No Love Lost" did not enter the Hot R&B/Hip-Hop Songs chart, but peaked at number 31 on the R&B/Hip-Hop Airplay chart.)	—	—	—	The Color Purple (Music from and Inspired By)
"—" denotes a recording that did not chart or was not released in that territory.

== Guest appearances ==
List of non-single guest appearances, with other performing artists, showing year released and album name
Title	Year	Other performer(s)	Album
"When Will Heaven Call"	1998	Nutt-So, Yvonne Cole	The Betrayal
"Nubian Queen" (Remix)	2001	Messy Marv, E-40	Still Explosive
"My Life"	2003	Young Noble, JT the Bigga Figga	Mobb Tales
"Get Up"	2003	—N/a	Biker Boyz: Music from the Motion Picture
"What's Going On"	2006	Remy Ma	There's Something About Remy: Based on a True Story
"Stay Down"	2006	Bailey	Champ Bailey
"Be Somebody"	2006	Dre	The Trunk
"Playa Cardz Right (Female)"	2006	2Pac	Pac's Life
"Oh"	2006	Messy Marv	What You Know bout Me?
"Mama"	2007	Ghostface Killah	Hidden Darts: Special Edition
"Best Friend"	2007	R. Kelly, Polow da Don	Double Up
"Love You Better"	2007	Keith Sweat	Tyler Perry's Why Did I Get Married? and Just Me
"#1 Fan"	2008	Plies, J. Holiday	Definition of Real
"Get Your Money Up"	2009	Keri Hilson, Trina	In a Perfect World...
"Number One" (Remix)	2009	R. Kelly, T-Pain	None
"Bad Bad Bad"	2009	Gucci Mane	The State vs. Radric Davis
"Can't Stay Away"	2010	Faith Evans	Something About Faith
"Trust My Love"	2011	P. Jericho	Money, Women & Alcohol
"Tell Me"	2011	Kafani, San Quinn	The Redemption of Quincy Brooks and Still Fast
"I'm Coming Out"	2014	Iggy Azalea	The Other Woman
"Ghetto Child"	2015	Nutt-So, Too Short, E-40	None
"Hit or Nah" (Remix)	2015	Rayven Justice, French Montana	None
"Black Heaven"	2015	Boosie Badazz, J. Cole	Touchdown 2 Cause Hell
"Nothing to Me"	2015	G-Eazy, E-40	When It's Dark Out
"Tit for Tat"	2016	Rayven Justice	Do It Justice
"All Around the World"	2016	Mistah F.A.B., Silk-E	Son of a Pimp Part 2
"Bad Liar" (Remix)	2020	Elijah Blake	The Neon Eon
"Happily Never After"	2021	G.No	Latin R&B King
"Alone"	2021	Tristan Rice	Another Year Without Friends
"Don't Leave"	2022	Antonio Brown	Paradigm
"Love Me Enough"	2023	Nicki Minaj, Monica	Pink Friday 2
"No Love Lost"	2023	—N/a	The Color Purple (Music from and Inspired By)
"Every Little Thing"	2024	Elijah Blake	Elijah (Deluxe edition)
"Don't Let Me Down"	2024	Hunxho	Thank God
"Tease Me"	2024	Troublez	None
"Someone"	2026	Masego	Fix Your Face

== Videography ==
=== Video albums ===
List of video albums, with selected details
Title	Details	Notes
Free Live Concert DVD	Released: 2005; Label: A&M; Format: DVD	A standalone live concert DVD released during the promotion of The Way It Is (2005).
Sessions@AOL	Released: July 26, 2005; Label: AOL Music; Format: DVD	A live recording DVD issued as part of AOL Music's Sessions series; also released digitally as an extended play.
BET Presents Keyshia Cole	Released: September 29, 2007; Label: Geffen, Imani, BET; Format: DVD	A bonus DVD included with select editions of Just like You (2007), featuring televised performances and music videos.

=== Music videos ===
==== As lead artist ====
List of music videos as lead artist, with directors, showing year released
Title	Year	Director(s)	Ref.
"I Changed My Mind"	2004	Nzingha Stewart	
"(I Just Want It) To Be Over"	2005	Benny Boom	
"I Should Have Cheated"	2005	Benny Boom	
"Love"	2006	Benny Boom	
"Let It Go" (featuring Missy Elliott and Lil' Kim)	2007	Benny Boom	
"Shoulda Let You Go" (featuring Amina Harris)	2007	Erik White	
"I Remember"	2007	Benny Boom	
"Heaven Sent"	2008	Benny Boom	
"Playa Cardz Right" (with 2Pac)	2008	Benny Boom	
"No Other" (featuring Amina Harris)	2008	GoldenBoyz	
"You Complete Me"	2009	Benny Boom	
"Trust" (with Monica)	2009	Chris Robinson	
"I Ain't Thru" (featuring Nicki Minaj)	2010	Benny Boom	
"Long Way Down"	2010	Benny Boom	
"Take Me Away"	2011	Taj Stansberry	
"Enough of No Love" (featuring Lil Wayne)	2012	Benny Boom	
"Trust and Believe"	2012	Benny Boom	
"I Choose You"	2013	Ethan Lader	
"Rick James" (featuring Juicy J)	2014	John Colombo	
"Next Time (Won't Give My Heart Away)"	2014	Colin Tilley	
"She"	2014	Keyshia Cole; John Colombo	
"N.L.U." (featuring 2 Chainz)	2014	Chandler Lass	
"Believer"	2014	Keyshia Cole; John Colombo	
"Love Letter" (featuring Future)	2014	John Colombo	
"Intro (Last Tango)"	2014	Keyshia Cole; John Colombo	
"Party Ain't a Party" (featuring Gavyn Rhone)	2014	Keyshia Cole; Dale Resteghini	
"Heat of Passion"	2014	John Colombo; Keyshia Cole	
"Remember (Part 2)"	2014	Keyshia Cole; Dale Resteghini	
"Do That For (B.A.B)"	2015	Keyshia Cole	
"New Nu"	2015	Keyshia Cole	
"You" (featuring Remy Ma and French Montana)	2017	Benny Boom	
"Incapable"	2017	Mike He	

==== As featured artist ====
List of music videos as featured performer, with directors, showing year released
Title	Year	Director(s)	Ref.
"(When You Gonna) Give It Up to Me" (Sean Paul featuring Keyshia Cole)	2006	Director X	
"Last Night" (Diddy featuring Keyshia Cole)	2007	Marc Webb	
"Dreamin'" (Jeezy featuring Keyshia Cole)	2007	Chris Robinson	
"I Got a Thang for You" (Trina featuring Keyshia Cole)	2008	—N/a	
"Boyfriend/Girlfriend" (C-Side featuring Keyshia Cole)	2008	—N/a	
"Game's Pain" (The Game featuring Keyshia Cole)	2008	The Game; Dale Resteghini	
"Don't Leave" (Antonio Brown featuring Keyshia Cole)	2022	—N/a	

==== Cameo appearances ====
List of cameo appearances in music videos, showing year released, artist, and directors
Title	Year	Artist(s)	Director	Ref.
"Whuteva"	2005	Remy Ma	David Palmer	
"She Got Her Own (Miss Independent Part 2)"	2008	Ne-Yo; Fabolous; Jamie Foxx	Vinroc	
