= List of awards and nominations received by Keyshia Cole =

Keyshia Cole awards and nominations
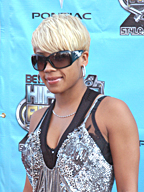
- Cole at the BET Hip Hop Awards in 2007
Awards and nominations
Award	Wins	Nominations
American Music Awards	0	4
BET Awards	0	8
BET Hip Hop Awards	1	2
Grammy Awards	0	4
NAACP Image Awards	1	2
Soul Train Music Awards	0	5
Urban Music Awards	0	2

Totals (Note: Certain award groups do not simply award one winner. They acknowledge several different recipients, have runners-up, and have third place. Since this is a specific recognition and is different from losing an award, runner-up mentions are considered wins in this award tally. For simplification and to avoid errors, each award in this list has been presumed to have had a prior nomination.)
- Wins: 14
- Nominations: 56

This is a list of awards and nominations received by Keyshia Cole, an American singer, songwriter and television personality.

Cole is a four-time Grammy Award nominee. She received her first nominations at the 50th Annual Grammy Awards for her second studio album, Just like You, and its single "Let It Go" (featuring Missy Elliott and Lil' Kim). At the 51st Annual Grammy Awards, she earned two additional nominations for "Heaven Sent", including Best R&B Song and Best Female R&B Vocal Performance. She has also received nominations from the American Music Awards, BET Awards, Soul Train Music Awards, Teen Choice Awards, and other organizations.

Throughout her career, Cole has received industry honors from songwriting and performance organizations. She won awards from the ASCAP Rhythm & Soul Music Awards for "Love" and "Let It Go", and from the BMI R&B/Hip-Hop Awards for collaborations including "(When You Gonna) Give It Up to Me" with Sean Paul and "Last Night" with Diddy. In 2005, she received the Vibe Award for the Next Award, and in 2008 she was named Songwriter of the Year at the ASCAP Pop Music Awards. As a featured artist, she has also been part of award-winning projects, including The Color Purple (Original Motion Picture Soundtrack) and Pink Friday 2, which received recognition from organizations such as the NAACP Image Awards, Black Reel Awards, and BET Hip Hop Awards.

== American Music Awards ==
Year	Nominee / work	Award	Result	Ref.
2006	Keyshia Cole	Favorite Soul/R&B Female Artist	Nominated	
2007	Thug Motivation 102: The Inspiration (as featured artist)	Favorite Rap/Hip Hop Album	Nominated	
2007	Double Up (as featured artist)	Favorite Soul/R&B Album	Nominated	
2009	Keyshia Cole	Favorite Soul/R&B Female Artist	Nominated	

== ASCAP Pop Music Awards ==
Year	Nominee / work	Award	Result	Ref.
2008	Keyshia Cole	Songwriter of the Year	Won	

== ASCAP Rhythm & Soul Music Awards ==
Year	Nominee / work	Award	Result	Ref.
2007	"Love"	Award Winning R&B/Hip-Hop Songs	Won	
2008	"Let It Go" (featuring Missy Elliott and Lil' Kim)	Award Winning R&B/Hip-Hop Songs	Won	

== BET Awards ==
Year	Nominee / work	Award	Result	Ref.
2006	Keyshia Cole	Best Female R&B/Pop Artist	Nominated	
2006	"Love"	Viewer's Choice	Nominated	
2007	"Last Night" (with Diddy)	Best Collaboration	Nominated	
2008	Keyshia Cole	Best Female R&B/Pop Artist	Nominated	
2008	"Let It Go" (featuring Missy Elliott and Lil' Kim)	Best Collaboration	Nominated	
2008	"Let It Go" (featuring Missy Elliott and Lil' Kim)	Viewer's Choice	Nominated	
2009	Keyshia Cole	Best Female R&B/Pop Artist	Nominated	
2024	Pink Friday 2 (as featured artist)	Album of the Year	Nominated	

== BET Hip Hop Awards ==
Year	Nominee / work	Award	Result	Ref.
2007	"Last Night" (with Diddy)	Best Collaboration	Nominated	
2024	Pink Friday 2 (as featured artist)	Album of the Year	Won	

== Billboard Music Awards ==
Year	Nominee / work	Award	Result	Ref.
2024	Pink Friday 2 (as featured artist)	Top Rap Album	Nominated	

== Billboard R&B/Hip-Hop Awards ==
Year	Nominee / work	Award	Result	Ref.
2006	Keyshia Cole	R&B/Hip-Hop Artists – Female	Nominated	
2006	Keyshia Cole	R&B/Hip-Hop Artists – New	Nominated	
2006	Keyshia Cole	R&B/Hip-Hop Artist	Nominated	

== Black Reel Awards ==
Year	Nominee / work	Award	Result	Ref.
2024	The Color Purple (Original Motion Picture Soundtrack) (as featured artist)	Outstanding Original Soundtrack	Won	

== Black Girls Rock! Awards ==
Year	Nominee / work	Award	Result	Ref.
2008	Herself	Soul Sister Award	Honored	

== BMI R&B/Hip-Hop Awards ==
Year	Nominee / work	Award	Result	Ref.
2007	"(When You Gonna) Give It Up to Me" (with Sean Paul)	Award Winning Songs	Won	
2008	"Last Night" (with Diddy)	Award Winning Songs	Won	
2008	"Let It Go" (featuring Missy Elliott and Lil' Kim)	Award Winning Songs	Won	

== Dr. Betty Bahiyah Shabazz Award ==
Year	Recipient	Category	Result	Ref.
2008	Keyshia Cole	Dr. Betty Bahiyah Shabazz Award	Honoree	

Note: Cole was honored for her community contributions alongside Ericka Huggins at the Malcolm X and Dr. Betty Shabazz Memorial and Educational Center in New York City.

== Early Entertainment Awards ==
Year	Nominee / work	Award	Result	Ref.
2008	"Heaven Sent"	Video of the Week	Won	

== Grammy Awards ==
Year	Nominee / work	Award	Result	Ref.
2008	"Let It Go" (featuring Missy Elliott and Lil' Kim)	Best Rap/Sung Collaboration	Nominated	
2008	Just like You	Best Contemporary R&B Album	Nominated	
2009	"Heaven Sent"	Best R&B Song	Nominated	
2009	"Heaven Sent"	Best Female R&B Vocal Performance	Nominated	

== MCP Music Awards ==
Year	Nominee / work	Award	Result	Ref.
2017	11:11 Reset	R&B Album of the Year	Nominated	
2017	"You"	Collaboration of the Year	Nominated	
2017	"You"	Video of the Year	Nominated	
2017	"Vault"	Best Deep Cut of the Year	Nominated	

== MP3 Music Awards ==
Year	Nominee / work	Award	Result	Ref.
2011	"Take Me Away"	The JSB Award	Won	

== MVPA Awards ==
Year	Nominee / work	Award	Result	Ref.
2013	"Enough of No Love"	Best R&B Video	Nominated	

== NAACP Image Awards ==
Year	Nominee / work	Award	Result	Ref.
2006	Keyshia Cole	Outstanding New Artist	Nominated	
2024	The Color Purple (Original Motion Picture Soundtrack) (as featured artist)	Outstanding Soundtrack/Compilation Album	Won	

== People's Choice Awards ==
Year	Nominee / work	Award	Result	Ref.
2024	Pink Friday 2 (as featured artist)	Album of the Year	Nominated	

== Rated R&B Music Awards ==
Year	Nominee / work	Award	Result	Ref.
2013	Woman to Woman	Best Comeback Album	Nominated	
2013	"Trust and Believe"	Music Video of the Year	Nominated	
2014	Herself	Female Artist of the Year	Nominated	

== SoulTracks Readers' Choice Awards ==
Year	Nominee / work	Award	Result	Ref.
2011	Calling All Hearts	Major Label Album of the Year	Nominated	

== Soul Train Music Awards ==
Year	Nominee / work	Award	Result	Ref.
2006	"I Should Have Cheated"	Best Female R&B/Soul Single	Nominated	
2006	"The Way It Is"	Best Female R&B/Soul Album	Nominated	
2007	"Love"	Best Female R&B/Soul Single	Nominated	
2007	"(When You Gonna) Give It Up to Me" (with Sean Paul)	Best R&B/Soul or Rap Dance Cut	Nominated	
2009	"Trust" (with Monica)	Best Collaboration	Nominated	
2012	Keyshia Cole	Best R&B/Soul Female Artist	Nominated	

== Teen Choice Awards ==
Year	Nominee / work	Award	Result	Ref.
2007	"Last Night" (with Diddy)	R&B/Hip-Hop Song	Nominated	

== TheDrop.fm Music Awards ==
Year	Nominee / work	Award	Result	Ref.
2012	Herself	Best Female R&B Artist	Nominated	

== Urban Music Awards ==
Year	Nominee / work	Award	Result	Ref.
2007	"Last Night" (with Diddy)	Best Collaboration	Nominated	
2009	In a Perfect World... (as featured artist)	Best Album	Nominated	

== Vibe Awards ==
Year	Nominee / work	Award	Result	Ref.
2005	Keyshia Cole	Next Award	Won	

== XXL Awards ==
Year	Nominee / work	Award	Result	Ref.
2024	Pink Friday 2 (as featured artist)	Album of the Year	Nominated	
