= Billboard Year-End Hot R&B/Hip-Hop Songs of 2008 =

American music chart

This is a list of Billboard magazine's Top Hot R&B/Hip-Hop Songs of 2008.

No.	Title	Artist(s)
1	"Like You'll Never See Me Again"	Alicia Keys
2	"I Remember"	Keyshia Cole
3	"Just Fine"	Mary J. Blige
4	"Heaven Sent"	Keyshia Cole
5	"Suffocate"	J. Holiday
6	"Lollipop"	Lil Wayne featuring Static Major
7	"Need U Bad"	Jazmine Sullivan
8	"No One"	Alicia Keys
9	"Spotlight"	Jennifer Hudson
10	"Can't Help but Wait"	Trey Songz
11	"Never"	Jaheim
12	"Crying Out for Me"	Mario
13	"Take You Down"	Chris Brown
14	"A Milli"	Lil Wayne
15	"Love in This Club"	Usher featuring Young Jeezy
16	"Bust It Baby (Part 2)"	Plies featuring Ne-Yo
17	"Whatever You Like"	T.I.
18	"I Luv Your Girl"	The-Dream featuring Young Jeezy
19	"Independent"	Webbie featuring Lil Boosie and Lil Phat
20	"Teenage Love Affair"	Alicia Keys
21	"Touch My Body"	Mariah Carey
22	"Put On"	Young Jeezy featuring Kanye West
23	"Woman"	Raheem DeVaughn
24	"Sensual Seduction"	Snoop Dogg
25	"Falsetto"	The-Dream
26	"Can't Believe It"	T-Pain featuring Lil Wayne
27	"Miss Independent"	Ne-Yo
28	"Take a Bow"	Rihanna
29	"With You"	Chris Brown
30	"Sexy Can I"	Ray J featuring Yung Berg
31	"Mrs. Officer"	Lil Wayne featuring Bobby Valentino and Kidd Kidd
32	"Last Time"	Trey Songz
33	"The Boss"	Rick Ross featuring T-Pain
34	"Dey Know"	Shawty Lo
35	"Until the End of Time"	Justin Timberlake and Beyoncé
36	"Never Would Have Made It"	Marvin Sapp
37	"The Way That I Love You"	Ashanti
38	"Good Life"	Kanye West featuring T-Pain
39	"Magic"	Robin Thicke
40	"Low"	Flo Rida featuring T-Pain
41	"Shoulda Let You Go"	Keyshia Cole featuring Amina
42	"Get Like Me"	David Banner featuring Chris Brown
43	"No Air"	Jordin Sparks and Chris Brown
44	"Got Money"	Lil Wayne featuring T-Pain
45	"Kiss Kiss"	Chris Brown featuring T-Pain
46	"Love in This Club Part II"	Usher featuring Beyoncé and Lil Wayne
47	"Customer"	Raheem DeVaughn
48	"Flashing Lights"	Kanye West featuring Dwele
49	"She Got It"	2 Pistols featuring T-Pain and Tay Dizm
50	"Music for Love"	Mario
51	"I Won't Tell"	Fat Joe featuring J. Holiday
52	"Umma Do Me"	Rocko
53	"I'm So Hood"	DJ Khaled featuring T-Pain, Trick Daddy, Rick Ross and Plies
54	"You're the Only One"	Eric Benét
55	"Duffle Bag Boy"	Playaz Circle featuring Lil Wayne
56	"Never Never Land"	Lyfe Jennings
57	"Please Excuse My Hands"	Plies featuring The-Dream & Jamie Foxx
58	"The Business"	Yung Berg featuring Casha
59	"Here I Am"	Rick Ross featuring Nelly and Avery Storm
60	"So Fly"	Slim featuring Yung Joc
61	"The River"	Noel Gourdin
62	"Live Your Life"	T.I. featuring Rihanna
63	"Pop Bottles"	Birdman featuring Lil Wayne
64	"Girls Around the World"	Lloyd featuring Lil Wayne
65	"Work That"	Mary J. Blige
66	"Lookin Boy"	Hotstylz featuring Yung Joc
67	"Honey"	Erykah Badu
68	"Get Silly"	V.I.C.
69	"Teachme"	Musiq Soulchild
70	"Superwoman"	Alicia Keys
71	"Bed"	J. Holiday
72	"Shawty Is a 10"	The-Dream
73	"Bust Your Windows"	Jazmine Sullivan
74	"When I See U"	Fantasia
75	"Single Ladies (Put a Ring on It)"	Beyoncé
76	"Closer"	Ne-Yo
77	"Girlfriend"	Bow Wow and Omarion
78	"Superstar"	Lupe Fiasco featuring Matthew Santos
79	"Did You Wrong"	Pleasure P
80	"Swagga Like Us"	Jay-Z and T.I. featuring Kanye West and Lil Wayne
81	"Sometimes"	Angie Stone
82	"I've Changed"	Jaheim featuring Keyshia Cole
83	"Green Light"	John Legend featuring André 3000
84	"Moving Mountains"	Usher
85	"Let It Go"	Keyshia Cole featuring Missy Elliott and Lil' Kim
86	"My Life"	The Game featuring Lil Wayne
87	"My Drink n My 2 Step"	Cassidy featuring Swizz Beatz
88	"Foolish"	Shawty Lo
89	"Hate That I Love You"	Rihanna featuring Ne-Yo
90	"What Them Girls Like"	Ludacris featuring Chris Brown and Sean Garrett
91	"Soulja Girl"	Soulja Boy featuring I-15
92	"Baby"	LL Cool J featuring The-Dream
93	"Mr. Carter"	Lil Wayne featuring Jay-Z
94	"I Know"	Jay-Z
95	"Energy"	Keri Hilson
96	"Game's Pain"	The Game featuring Keyshia Cole
97	"Hypnotized"	Plies featuring Akon
98	"Roc Boys (And the Winner Is)..."	Jay-Z
99	"Ching-a-Ling"	Missy Elliott
100	"Go On Girl"	Ne-Yo

== See also ==
- 2008 in music
- Billboard Year-End Hot 100 singles of 2008
- Billboard Year-End Hot Rap Songs of 2008
- List of number-one R&B singles of 2008 (U.S.)
