= List of number-one R&B/hip-hop songs of 2008 (U.S.) =

The Billboard Hot R&B/Hip-Hop Songs chart ranks the best-performing singles in that category in the United States. The first number-one song of the year was claimed by Alicia Keys with her song "Like You'll Never See Me Again", from her third studio album As I Am (2007). In total, it spent seven consecutive weeks at number one. "Like You'll Never See Me Again" also ranked as the number one R&B song of the year, achieving more radio impressions than any other R&B song in 2008. Displacing Keys from number one, Keyshia Cole's song "I Remember" from her second studio album Just like You (2007) also topped the chart for seven consecutive weeks. It ranked at number two on the best performing R&B songs chart of 2008. Usher, featuring Young Jeezy, was the third artist of 2008 to achieve a number one song on the chart with "Love in This Club" (Here I Stand, 2008) on April 12, a position it maintained for a further three consecutive weeks. It ranked at number 15 on the best performing R&B songs chart of 2008.

Lil Wayne's song "Lollipop", featuring Static Major, from his sixth studio album Tha Carter III (2008) ascended to number one on May 10, and remained at the peak for a further five consecutive weeks. It ranked at number six on the best performing R&B songs chart of 2008. Cole ascended to number one for a second time with her song "Heaven Sent", also from Just Like You. It peaked atop the chart on June 21, and spent nine consecutive weeks at number one in total. It ranked at number four on the best performing R&B songs chart of 2008. Lil Wayne also returned to the number one position with his song "A Milli", also from Tha Carter III, on August 23 for one week. It ranked at number 14 on the best performing R&B songs chart of 2008. The following week, Rihanna claimed the number one position for one week with her song "Take a Bow", from the re-release of her 2007 third studio album Good Girl Gone Bad, similarly titled Good Girl Gone Bad: Reloaded (2008). It ranked at number 28 on the best performing R&B songs chart of 2008.

Jazmine Sullivan succeeded Rihanna with her song "Need U Bad", from her debut studio album Fearless (2008), for four consecutive weeks. It ranked at number seven on the best performing R&B songs chart of 2008. On October 4, T.I.'s song "Whatever You Like" (Paper Trail, 2008) rose to the number one position, where it remained for three consecutive weeks. It ranked at number 17 on the best performing R&B songs chart of 2008. Jennifer Hudson spent two consecutive weeks at number one with her song "Spotlight" (Jennifer Hudson, 2008). It ranked at number nine on the best performing R&B songs chart of 2008. Ne-Yo's "Miss Independent", from his fifth studio album Year of the Gentleman (2008), topped the chart for three consecutive weeks. The last artist to achieve a number one on the chart in 2008 was Beyoncé with her song "Single Ladies (Put a Ring on It)" (I Am... Sasha Fierce, 2008), which ascended to number one on November 29, a position it held for the remainder of the year. It ranked at number 75 on the best performing R&B songs chart of 2008.

== List ==
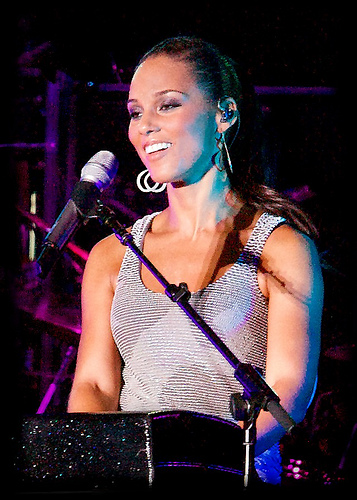
Alicia Keys' song "Like You'll Never See Me Again" was the most popular R&B song on US radio in 2008, and ranked at the number one position on the list of the top 50 most played songs.

Key
†	Indicates best charting R&B single of 2008; Note: Year-end most popular R&B and hip-hop songs, ranked by radio airplay audience impressions as measured by Nielsen BDS and sales data as compiled Nielsen SoundScan

Issue date	Song	Artist(s)	Ref.
January 5	"Like You'll Never See Me Again" †	Alicia Keys	
January 12	"Like You'll Never See Me Again" †	Alicia Keys	
January 19	"Like You'll Never See Me Again" †	Alicia Keys	
January 26	"Like You'll Never See Me Again" †	Alicia Keys	
February 2	"Like You'll Never See Me Again" †	Alicia Keys	
February 9	"Like You'll Never See Me Again" †	Alicia Keys	
February 16	"Like You'll Never See Me Again" †	Alicia Keys	
February 23	"I Remember"	Keyshia Cole	
March 1	"I Remember"	Keyshia Cole	
March 8	"I Remember"	Keyshia Cole	
March 15	"I Remember"	Keyshia Cole	
March 22	"I Remember"	Keyshia Cole	
March 29	"I Remember"	Keyshia Cole	
April 5	"I Remember"	Keyshia Cole	
April 12	"Love in This Club"	Usher featuring Young Jeezy	
April 19	"Love in This Club"	Usher featuring Young Jeezy	
April 26	"Love in This Club"	Usher featuring Young Jeezy	
May 3	"Love in This Club"	Usher featuring Young Jeezy	
May 10	"Lollipop"	Lil Wayne featuring Static Major	
May 17	"Lollipop"	Lil Wayne featuring Static Major	
May 24	"Lollipop"	Lil Wayne featuring Static Major	
May 31	"Lollipop"	Lil Wayne featuring Static Major	
June 7	"Lollipop"	Lil Wayne featuring Static Major	
June 14	"Lollipop"	Lil Wayne featuring Static Major	
June 21	"Heaven Sent"	Keyshia Cole	
June 28	"Heaven Sent"	Keyshia Cole	
July 5	"Heaven Sent"	Keyshia Cole	
July 12	"Heaven Sent"	Keyshia Cole	
July 19	"Heaven Sent"	Keyshia Cole	
July 26	"Heaven Sent"	Keyshia Cole	
August 2	"Heaven Sent"	Keyshia Cole	
August 9	"Heaven Sent"	Keyshia Cole	
August 16	"Heaven Sent"	Keyshia Cole	
August 23	"A Milli"	Lil Wayne	
August 30	"Take a Bow"	Rihanna	
September 6	"Need U Bad"	Jazmine Sullivan	
September 13	"Need U Bad"	Jazmine Sullivan	
September 20	"Need U Bad"	Jazmine Sullivan	
September 27	"Need U Bad"	Jazmine Sullivan	
October 4	"Whatever You Like"	T.I.	
October 11	"Whatever You Like"	T.I.	
October 18	"Whatever You Like"	T.I.	
October 25	"Spotlight"	Jennifer Hudson	
November 1	"Spotlight"	Jennifer Hudson	
November 8	"Miss Independent"	Ne-Yo	
November 15	"Miss Independent"	Ne-Yo	
November 22	"Miss Independent"	Ne-Yo	
November 29	"Single Ladies (Put a Ring on It)"	Beyoncé	
December 6	"Single Ladies (Put a Ring on It)"	Beyoncé	
December 13	"Single Ladies (Put a Ring on It)"	Beyoncé	
December 20	"Single Ladies (Put a Ring on It)"	Beyoncé	
December 27	"Single Ladies (Put a Ring on It)"	Beyoncé	

== See also ==
- 2008 in music
- Billboard Year-End Hot R&B/Hip-Hop Songs of 2008
- List of number-one rhythm and blues hits (United States)
