= Billboard Year-End Hot Rap Songs of 2008 =

American music chart

This is a list of Billboard magazine's Top Hot Rap Songs of 2008.

After being absent from the physical Billboard magazine from April 30, 2005, to January 19, 2008, during which they were exclusive to the Billboard website, the rap charts returned to the magazine beginning with January 26, 2008 issue. Upon its return to print, the chart was renamed from Hot Rap Tracks to Hot Rap Songs. The year-end rap songs chart, which had been absent from the "Year in Music" issues released at the end of the year after 2004, returned to the magazine on December 20, 2008, for the first time in four years.

| No. | Title | Artist(s) |
|---|---|---|
| 1 | "Lollipop" | Lil Wayne featuring Static Major |
| 2 | "Low" | Flo Rida featuring T-Pain |
| 3 | "Bust It Baby (Part 2)" | Plies featuring Ne-Yo |
| 4 | "Whatever You Like" | T.I. |
| 5 | "A Milli" | Lil Wayne |
| 6 | "Independent" | Webbie featuring Lil Boosie and Lil Phat |
| 7 | "Got Money" | Lil Wayne featuring T-Pain |
| 8 | "Get Like Me" | David Banner featuring Chris Brown |
| 9 | "Put On" | Young Jeezy featuring Kanye West |
| 10 | "The Boss" | Rick Ross featuring T-Pain |
| 11 | "Good Life" | Kanye West featuring T-Pain |
| 12 | "Mrs. Officer" | Lil Wayne featuring Bobby Valentino and Kidd Kidd |
| 13 | "She Got It" | 2 Pistols featuring T-Pain and Tay Dizm |
| 14 | "Dangerous" | Kardinal Offishall featuring Akon |
| 15 | "Flashing Lights" | Kanye West featuring Dwele |
| 16 | "Dey Know" | Shawty Lo |
| 17 | "Hypnotized" | Plies featuring Akon |
| 18 | "Duffle Bag Boy" | Playaz Circle featuring Lil Wayne |
| 19 | "I Won't Tell" | Fat Joe featuring J. Holiday |
| 20 | "The Business" | Yung Berg featuring Casha |
| 21 | "Live Your Life" | T.I. featuring Rihanna |
| 22 | "Here I Am" | Rick Ross featuring Nelly and Avery Storm |
| 23 | "My Life" | The Game featuring Lil Wayne |
| 24 | "Superstar" | Lupe Fiasco featuring Matthew Santos |
| 25 | "I'm So Hood" | DJ Khaled featuring T-Pain, Trick Daddy, Rick Ross and Plies |

== See also ==
- 2008 in music
- Billboard Year-End Hot 100 singles of 2008
- Billboard Year-End Hot R&B/Hip-Hop Songs of 2008
- List of Billboard number-one rap singles of 2008
