= Shoulda Let You Go =

Single by Keyshia Cole featuring Amina

from the album Just like You
- Released: October 19, 2007
- Genre: R&B; hip hop soul
- Length: 3:41
- Label: Imani; Geffen
- Songwriters: Keyshia Cole; Rodney Jerkins
- Producer: Rodney "Darkchild" Jerkins

Keyshia Cole singles chronology
"Let It Go" (2007)	"Shoulda Let You Go" (2007)	"I Remember" (2007)

"Shoulda Let You Go" is a song by American R&B singer Keyshia Cole. It was written by Cole and Rodney "Darkchild" Jerkins for her second studio album Just like You (2007), while production was helmed by Jerkins. The song features additional vocals by rapper Amina. "Shoulda Let You Go" premiered on August 25, 2007, on V103, an Atlanta-based radio station, and was later released as the album's second single. It reached number 41 on the US Billboard Hot 100 and peaked at number six on the Hot R&B/Hip-Hop Songs.

== Music video ==
The video was shot in Miami and directed by Erik White. It premiered on BET's Access Granted on October 4, 2007. The video begins with Cole sleeping as we see roses and an answering machine showing that she has been given ten missed calls and twelve unread messages from her ex. It then shows Cole partying while interacting with her best friends. Scenes of her dancing in a bikini on a beach are shown in-between as well as Cole dancing with a bunch of male dancers. Rapper Amina makes an appearance in the video.

== Track listings ==
CD single
No.	Title	Writer(s)	Producer(s)	Length
1.	"Shoulda Let You Go" (main version featuring Amina)	Keyshia Cole; Rodney Jerkins	Jerkins; Ron Fair^{[a]}	3:42
2.	"Shoulda Let You Go" (non-rap version)	Cole; Jerkins	Jerkins; Fair^{[a]}	3:31
3.	"Shoulda Let You Go" (instrumental)	Cole; Jerkins	Jerkins	3:42

Notes

- ^{^[a]} signifies vocal producer

== Credits and personnel ==
Credits adapted from the liner notes of Just like You.

- Amina – vocals
- Keyshia Cole – vocals, writer
- Ron Fair – vocal producer
- Rodney Jerkins – producer, writer
- Dave Pensado – mixing engineer

== Charts ==
=== Weekly charts ===
Chart (2007)	Peak position
Germany Urban (DBC)	15
Netherlands Urban (MegaCharts)	37
New Zealand Urban Radio (RMNZ)	29
US Billboard Hot 100	41
US Hot R&B/Hip-Hop Songs (Billboard)	6
US Rhythmic Airplay (Billboard)	32

=== Year-end charts ===
Chart (2007)	Position
Germany Urban (Deutsche Black Charts)	97
US Hot R&B/Hip-Hop Songs (Billboard)	92
Chart (2008)	Position
US Hot R&B/Hip-Hop Songs (Billboard)	41
