= I Remember (Keyshia Cole song) =

Single by Keyshia Cole

from the album Just like You
- Released: December 5, 2007
- Genre: R&B
- Length: 4:20
- Label: Imani; Geffen
- Songwriters: Keyshia Cole; Greg Curtis
- Producer: Gregory G. Curtis

Keyshia Cole singles chronology
"Shoulda Let You Go" (2007)	"I Remember" (2007)	"I Got a Thang for You" (2008)

"I Remember" is a song by American recording artist Keyshia Cole. It was written by Cole and Gregory G. Curtis for her second album Just like You (2007), with production helmed by the latter. "I Remember" was released as the album's third single in December 2007 and reached number one on the US Billboard Hot R&B/Hip-Hop Songs chart, while peaking at number 24 on the US Billboard Hot 100.

== Music video ==
The video for "I Remember" premiered on BET's Access Granted on December 5, 2007. The video was directed by Benny Boom, who has directed fourteen of Cole's videos.

== Cover versions ==
British soul singer Mica Paris released a cover version of "I Remember" on her 2009 album Born Again. American singer Aretha Franklin covered the song in her live shows in 2008 and 2014.

== Credits and personnel ==
Credits adapted from the liner notes of Just like You.

- Keyshia Cole – arranger, vocals, writer
- Gregory G. Curtis – producer, writer
- Ron Fair – arranger, conductor
- Jaycen Joshua – mixing engineer
- Dave Pensado – mixing engineer
- Allen Sides – strings
- Andrew Wuepper – assistant mixing engineer

== Charts ==
=== Weekly charts ===
Chart (2007–2008)	Peak position
US Billboard Hot 100	24
US Hot R&B/Hip-Hop Songs (Billboard)	1
US Rhythmic Airplay (Billboard)	21

=== Year-end charts ===
Chart (2008)	Position
US Billboard Hot 100	89
US Hot R&B/Hip-Hop Songs (Billboard)	2

== See also ==
- List of number-one R&B/hip-hop songs of 2008 (U.S.)
