= Hidden Darts: Special Edition =

Compilation album by Ghostface Killah
- Released: March 13, 2007
- Genre: Hip hop
- Label: Starks Enterprises

Ghostface Killah chronology
More Fish (2006)	Hidden Darts: Special Edition (2007)	The Big Doe Rehab (2007)

Hidden Darts: Special Edition is a compilation of rare album B-Sides, unreleased, and mixtape tracks by Ghostface Killah, an American hip-hop musician. The album features guests from the Wu-Tang Clan rap group, as well as members from Ghostface's Theodore Unit. "The Watch", "The Sun" & "Good Times" are B-Sides left over from the Bulletproof Wallets era and were shown in the track listing of the early pressings but were never on the album.

== Track listing ==
#	Title	Composer(s)	Performer(s)	Producer(s)	Length
1	"Hidden Darts"	D. Coles	Ghostface Killah	J-Love	2:51
2	"The Watch"	D. Coles; C. Woods	Ghostface Killah; Raekwon	RZA	3:04
3	"Belt Holders"	D. Coles; C. Woods	Ghostface Killah; Raekwon		2:25
4	"In The Parks"	D. Coles	Ghostface Killah		0:48
5	"When You Walk"	D. Coles; C. Smith; P. Charles	Ghostface Killah; Method Man; Streetlife	RZA	4:27
6	"Murda Goons"	D. Coles	Ghostface Killah	J Dilla	3:07
7	"Odd Couple"	D. Coles; D. Hill	Ghostface Killah; Cappadonna	Ayatollah	4:07
8	"Good Times"	D. Coles; C. Woods	Ghostface Killah; Raekwon		3:14
9	"Cheche La Ghost (Remix)"	D. Coles	Ghostface Killah		3:14
10	"Milk Crates"	D. Coles	Ghostface Killah	Kid Capri	0:52
11	"Return of Theodore Unit"	D. Coles	Ghostface Killah; Wigs; J-Love; Trife Da God	DJ Premier	4:11
12	"9 MM" (a J-Love remix of "9mm Bros.")	D. Coles	Ghostface Killah; Wu-Tang Clan	J-Love	4:17
13	"The Sun"	D. Coles; R. Walters; C. Woods; R. Diggs	Ghostface Killah; Slick Rick; Raekwon; RZA	RZA	3:22
14	"Mama"	D. Coles; K. Cole	Ghostface Killah; Keyshia Cole	Grind Music	4:35
15	"Love Stories"	D. Coles	Ghostface Killah; Wigs	Fess	3:12
16	"Wise"	D. Coles	Ghostface Killah		4:47
17	"No No No"	D. Coles	Ghostface Killah	Steely & Clevie	3:11
18	"Black Cream"	D. Coles	Ghostface Killah		2:23
19	"Drummer"	D. Coles; C. Smith; P. Charles	Ghostface Killah; Method Man; Streetlife	Self	2:48
20	"Late Night Arrival"	D. Coles	Ghostface Killah; Trife Da God; Wigs	J-Love	2:18
21	"Paycheck"	D. Coles	Ghostface Killah; Trife Da God	D-Prosper, K-Def	3:01
22	"Heard It All Before"	D. Coles	Ghostface Killah	Mike City	4:10
