= Last Night (Diddy song) =

Single by P. Diddy featuring Keyshia Cole

from the album Press Play and Just like You
- Released: February 27, 2007
- Recorded: 2006
- Genre: R&B; dance
- Length: 6:26 (album version); 4:18 (radio edit)
- Label: Bad Boy; Atlantic
- Songwriters: Sean Combs; Keyshia Cole; Jack Knight; Mario Winans; Shannon "Slam" Lawrence
- Producers: Winans; Combs (co.)

P. Diddy singles chronology
| "We Fly High (Remix)" (2006) | "Last Night" (2007) | "Through the Pain (She Told Me)" (2007) |

Keyshia Cole singles chronology
| "(When You Gonna) Give It Up to Me" (2006) | "Last Night" (2007) | "Dreamin'" (2007) |

"Last Night" is a song by American rapper P. Diddy, released by Bad Boy and Atlantic Records on February 27, 2007, as the third single from his fourth studio album, Press Play (2006). Produced by Diddy and American singer Mario Winans, the song is a duet with American singer-songwriter Keyshia Cole. The radio edit version of the song is featured on Cole's second studio album, Just like You (2007).

"Last Night" peaked at number ten on the Billboard Hot 100, becoming the second single from Press Play to peak within the top ten; it landed at number 42 on its year-end chart. Part of the recording session was shown on Cole's reality show, Keyshia Cole: The Way It Is, on BET in July 2006. The making of the video premiered on BET's Access Granted on January 31, 2007. A sequel to the song appears on Dirty Money's album Last Train to Paris (2010).

== Background ==
The song is a modern classic styled song. "Last Night" samples the drumbeat of the songs "Erotic City" and "Raspberry Beret", but slightly modified to increase the bass. During BET's Access Granted, Diddy brought up the fact that Cole re-recorded her parts multiple times, and the two had many artistic differences on the song. The recording of the song was featured on Cole's reality show The Way It Is. On the UK radio version of the song, Diddy is heard talking on the phone only with the explicit words censored out at the end. The radio version of the song fades out before the phone dials, while the clean album version of the song still has this part only with the explicit words censored out.

== Composition ==
"Last Night" is written in the key of E minor (recorded a half-step lower in E♭ minor). The song moves at a tempo of 121 beats per minute, and the vocals in the song span from B_{3} to D_{5}.

== Chart performance ==
"Last Night" peaked at number ten on the Hot 100, becoming his second top-ten hit off Press Play and to date last top 10 of Diddy on the chart. The track was a moderate hit worldwide. "Last Night" managed to go top 20 in ten different countries. In the UK, "Last Night" only reached number 14, becoming his first single from Press Play not to hit the top ten.

== Live performance ==
On June 26, 2007, Diddy performed "Last Night" at the 2007 BET Awards which featured Cole and Lil' Kim.

== Formats and track listings ==
US 12" promotional single

Side A

1. "Last Night" [radio edit] 4:18
2. "Last Night" [mix show amended version] 6:26

Side B

1. "Last Night" [explicit version] 6:26
2. "Last Night" [clean] 6:26

UK Single

1. "Last Night" [radio edit] 4:18
2. "Tell Me" [DFA remix – radio edit] 4:06

== Remixes ==
The official remix has two versions and has R&B singer Keyshia Cole on both of them; the first remix, the Dirty South Remix, features the Game, Big Boi, Yung Joc and Rich Boy, and the second remix, the NYC Remix, features Lil' Kim and Busta Rhymes. There is also a DJ Noodles remix that features Cole, T.I. and Pharrell Williams.

== Charts ==
=== Weekly charts ===
| Chart (2007) | Peak position |
|---|---|
| Australia (ARIA) | 53 |
| Australian Urban (ARIA) | 13 |
| Austria (Ö3 Austria Top 40) | 54 |
| Belgium (Ultratip Bubbling Under Flanders) | 21 |
| Belgium (Ultratip Bubbling Under Wallonia) | 8 |
| Canada Hot 100 (Billboard) | 23 |
| Denmark (Tracklisten) | 15 |
| European Hot 100 Singles (Billboard) | 31 |
| Finland (Suomen virallinen lista) | 4 |
| France (SNEP) | 99 |
| Germany (GfK) | 25 |
| Hungary (Rádiós Top 40) | 24 |
| Hungary (Dance Top 40) | 19 |
| Ireland (IRMA) | 9 |
| Netherlands (Dutch Top 40) | 31 |
| Netherlands (Single Top 100) | 37 |
| Scottish Singles Sales (Official Charts) | 17 |
| Slovakia Airplay (ČNS IFPI) | 29 |
| Switzerland (Schweizer Hitparade) | 33 |
| UK Singles (Official Charts) | 14 |
| UK Hip Hop/R&B (Official Charts) | 1 |
| US Billboard Hot 100 | 10 |
| US Hot R&B/Hip-Hop Songs (Billboard) | 7 |
| US Pop Airplay (Billboard) | 7 |
| US Rhythmic Airplay (Billboard) | 3 |

=== Year-end charts ===
| Chart (2007) | Position |
|---|---|
| Brazil (Crowley) | 13 |
| German Singles Chart | 90 |
| UK Singles Chart | 81 |
| UK Urban (Music Week) | 8 |
| US Billboard Hot 100 | 42 |
| US R&B/Hip-Hop Songs (Billboard) | 41 |
| US Rhythmic Songs (Billboard) | 28 |

| Chart (2008) | Position |
|---|---|
| Brazil (Crowley) | 29 |

== Certifications ==
| Region | Certification | Certified units/sales |
|---|---|---|
| New Zealand (RMNZ) | Gold | 15,000^{‡} |
| United Kingdom (BPI) | Silver | 200,000^{‡} |
^{‡} Sales+streaming figures based on certification alone.
