= Love Me Enough =

2023 song by Nicki Minaj featuring Monica and Keyshia Cole

Song by Nicki Minaj featuring Monica and Keyshia Cole

from the album Pink Friday 2
- Genre: Hip hop; R&B
- Length: 3:50
- Label: Republic
- Songwriters: Onika Maraj; Justin Tranter; Victoria Monét; Shane Lindstrom; Charlie Handsome; Joseph L'Étranger; Derrick Milano
- Producers: Murda Beatz; Charlie Handsome; L'Étranger

Audio video
- "Love Me Enough" on YouTube

"Love Me Enough" is a song by rapper Nicki Minaj featuring American singers Monica and Keyshia Cole from Minaj's fifth studio album Pink Friday 2 (2023). The song is written by Minaj, Derrick Milano, Justin Tranter, Victoria Monét, and its producers Shane Lindstrom, Joseph L'Étranger and Charlie Handsome.

== Background and release ==
Rumors about Nicki Minaj collaborating with Monica and Keyshia Cole first started on 1 December 2023, when Minaj went on Instagram Live with them. The live featured freestyles from the artists, who jokingly named their group as Mo'Nicki'Cole.

Minaj released her fifth studio album Pink Friday 2 on 8 December 2023. After the release of the album, Minaj announced that she would release new tracks over the next week for a deluxe edition of the album. The first deluxe track released was "Beep Beep" featuring American rapper 50 Cent.

13 December, following an Instagram post where she teased the featured artists, Minaj announced a new limited edition of the album exclusively on her official website, which would feature a new song "Love Me Enough", a collaboration with Monica and Cole. On 15 December, the song was included on a Gag City Deluxe version of the album and uploaded to streaming services.

"Love Me Enough" is a hip-hop and R&B song. Lyrically it delves into the importance of self-love, the process of rebuilding after a toxic relationship, and prioritizing yourself.

"Love Me Enough" marks the second time Minaj and Cole work together, following Nicki's appearance on her 2010 single "I Ain't Thru" from Cole's fourth studio album Calling All Hearts (2010), and the first time Minaj and Monica work together. Monica and Cole previously collaborated on Cole's 2009 single "Trust" from her third studio album A Different Me (2008).

== Reception ==
Zachary Horvath from HotNewHipHop hailed "Love Me Enough" as "the ultimate women empowerment song that urges them to love themselves, even if they are alone", outlining how Monica's and Cole's "booming vocals add to the energy the record is giving off". Journalist Sway Calloway characterized the song as "a testament to self-love and independence", emphasizing how "Minaj's lyrics resonate with raw honesty and vulnerability" creating "a powerful message that many listeners can resonate with", and continued how "the combination of [Minaj's] hard-hitting lines with Monica and Keyshia Cole’s soulful vocals give “Love Me Enough” a unique blend of hip-hop and R&B, resulting in a track that’s both inspiring and relatable". Keithan Samuels from Rated R&B encapsulated the song as a "a self-love anthem that celebrates an exit from a toxic relationship", highlighting its "sunny acoustic production".

== Charts ==
Chart performance for "Love Me Enough"
Chart (2023)	Peak position
US R&B/Hip-Hop Digital Songs (Billboard)	6
US Rap Digital Song Sales (Billboard)	5
