= Dreamin' (Young Jeezy song) =

Single by Young Jeezy featuring Keyshia Cole

from the album The Inspiration
- Released: April 6, 2007
- Recorded: 2006
- Genre: Hip hop
- Length: 4:49
- Label: Def Jam
- Songwriters: Andrew Harr; Bill Summers; Claytoven Richardson; Jermaine Jackson; Jay Jenkins; Larry Batiste
- Producer: The Runners

Young Jeezy singles chronology
"Go Getta" (2007)	"Dreamin'" (2007)	"Diamonds" (2007)

Keyshia Cole singles chronology
"Last Night" (2007)	"Dreamin'" (2007)	"Let It Go" (2007)

"Dreamin'" is a song by American rapper Young Jeezy's released as the third single from his second album The Inspiration. It features singer Keyshia Cole and is produced by The Runners.

It samples Bill Summers' song "Dreaming". This beat was sampled in the song "Another Trill N*gga Gone", a Pimp C tribute by Young B. and A-Dub.

== Music video ==
The video directed by Chris Robinson was released on May 2, 2007, on MTV2's Sucker Free. In the music video Ice Cube's shirt style is similar to that of The Diplomats's in the video for the 2002 hit single "Bout It Bout It..., Part III".

== Charts ==
Chart (2007)	Peak position
Netherlands Urban (MegaCharts)	16
US Hot R&B/Hip-Hop Songs (Billboard)	65
