= Just like You (Keyshia Cole album) =

Studio album by Keyshia Cole
- Released: September 25, 2007
- Length: 57:23
- Labels: Imani; Geffen; Interscope
- Producers: Donald Alford; Cliff Brown; Shawn Carroll; Bryan-Michael Cox; Greg Curtis; Missy Elliott; Ron Fair; J-Vibe; Rodney Jerkins; Lex; Tony Rey; Pete Rock; The Runners; Soulshock & Karlin; Scott Storch; J. Wells; Mario Winans

Keyshia Cole chronology
The Way It Is (2005)	Just like You (2007)	A Different Me (2008)

Singles from Just Like You
- 1. "Let It Go" Released: June 19, 2007; 2. "Shoulda Let You Go" Released: October 19, 2007; 3. "I Remember" Released: December 5, 2007; 4. "Heaven Sent" Released: March 27, 2008

Just like You is the second studio album by American singer Keyshia Cole. It was released by Geffen Records and Interscope Records on September 25, 2007. Cole started work on the project shortly after the release of her debut album, The Way It Is (2005). She consulted a variety of producers and songwriters to work with her on the album, including Missy Elliott, Bryan-Michael Cox, Scott Storch, Rodney Jerkins, The Runners, J. Wells, Pete Rock, and Soulshock. Guest vocalists include Elliott, Lil' Kim, Too $hort, Amina Harris, Anthony Hamilton, Young Dro, T.I., Chink Santana, and Piper.

Upon release, Just Like You received mixed and positive reviews from music critics who considered it one of the better R&B albums of the year but was critical about the abundance of ballads within the track listing. She was also dubbed by some critics as the "princess of hip-hop soul". It was nominated for Best Contemporary R&B Album at the 50th Annual Grammy Awards that was held February 2008, but lost to Ne-Yo's Because of You (2007). As of December 2007, the album has been certified platinum in sales by the Recording Industry Association of America (RIAA) and remains Cole's highest-selling album to date with 1.7 million copies sold.

== Conception ==
Cole started work on her second album shortly after the release of her debut album, The Way It Is. Cole said about the album: "This album is more about you inside, and how you need to get yourself together, rather than pointing at somebody else and saying: 'You don't treat me right, you don't do this.' I'm truly lovin it, I listen to it myself. The last album, I didn't really listen to until I went on tour. When you listen to your own experience, it's like, I don't want to hear it anymore. I do write from my personal experiences, but I think it's very important to young women."

== Release and promotion ==
The first single off the album is "Let It Go", an upbeat club track that features Missy Elliott and Lil' Kim. The video premiered on BET's Access Granted on July 11, 2007. The second single is the Darkchild-produced "Shoulda Let You Go". The album was promoted with the second season of her reality show, Keyshia Cole: The Way It Is, which premiered on October 30, 2007. "Give Me More" came in at No.1 on The Editor's List inside Cove Magazine October 2007 Issue for the top 5 Soul/R&B recordings for the month of September 2007. To accompany the album's promotional campaign, Cole and BET released a DVD titled BET Presents Keyshia Cole in 2007. The DVD was associated with Just like You and was issued under the Geffen Records, Imani Entertainment Group and BET names. The album's title track was the theme for Cole's BET reality series during seasons 2 and 3.

On November 27, 2008, the album was released in Australia, titled Just Like You (International Deluxe Version). This release is a hybrid of Just Like You and The Way It Is and also features Keyshia's collaborations with Diddy and Sean Paul. It contains 16 songs and has a different cover to the original version of the album. On May 9, 2008, the international album had been released in Germany, Austria, and Switzerland as well.

=== Tour ===
To promote Just like You, Cole embarked on a multi-city concert tour during the summer of 2007. In August, a press announcement reported that she was preparing a series of performances at House of Blues venues in support of the album. The tour was later described as a 20-city House of Blues tour. The tour was previewed in an August 2007 report by Prefixmag.

A schedule published in August listed the following dates for the tour:

Date	City	Venue
August 24, 2007	North Myrtle Beach, South Carolina	House of Blues Myrtle Beach
August 25, 2007	Atlanta	Center Stage
August 26, 2007	Lake Buena Vista, Florida	House of Blues Orlando
August 29, 2007	New Orleans	House of Blues
August 30, 2007	Dallas	House of Blues
September 1, 2007	Las Vegas	House of Blues
September 2, 2007	West Hollywood, California	House of Blues
September 3, 2007	West Hollywood, California	House of Blues
September 5, 2007	San Diego	4th & B Concert Theater
September 6, 2007	Anaheim, California	House of Blues
September 7, 2007	San Francisco	Mezzanine
September 9, 2007	Seattle	The Showbox

During a September 2 performance at the House of Blues, Cole performed songs from her debut album alongside material from the then-upcoming Just like You, including its lead single, "Let It Go". The concert featured a six-piece backing band. Los Angeles Times critic Mikael Wood noted that "Last Night", Cole's collaboration with Sean Combs, was a highlight of the hourlong performance.

== Critical reception ==
Professional ratings
Aggregate scores
Source	Rating
Metacritic	72/100
Review scores
Source	Rating
About.com	3/5 stars
AllMusic	4.5/5 stars
Artistdirect	3/5 stars
Entertainment Weekly	C
Rolling Stone	3/5 stars
Stylus	A−

Just Like You received mixed to positive reviews from music critics. At Metacritic, which assigns a normalized rating out of 100 to reviews from mainstream critics, the album has an average score of 72 based on 11 reviews, indicating "generally favorable reviews". Album of the Year collected 3 reviews and calculated an average of 67 out of 100.

Allmusic editor Andy Kellman found that "in some ways, Just Like You plays out like an album that could've only been made after Mary J. Blige's Breakthrough, balancing desperation with conviction and mixing lush arrangements with penetrative melodies. Despite all this weirdness, this stands as a very good album by Keyshia Cole to the point where Cole's voice grows from an occasionally powerful emotive device into a versatile instrument." Similarly, Thomas Inskeep from Stylus noted that while the "album isn't perfect," it proves "that Cole's capable of some seriously rich, powerful art." He added: "Cole's still finding her way, but on Just Like You it sounds as if she's already named and claimed her voice. Just Like You is tough and tender like Blige's sophomore album My Life, and while it may not quite match its predecessor's legendary status, it's not so far off and it sounds like the R&B album of the year, easily." Amy Linden of The Village Voice found that Just Like You "runs the thematic gamut" and added: "You can't deny the pleasure of finding a ride-or-die chick who’s vulnerable, but can still kick your trifling ass." Washington Post's Sarah Godfrey noted that with Just like You, the singer was "branding herself a more mature artist [...] Cole, whose strong vocals and hostility have been a bit "Scary J. Blige" in the past, reveals herself to be a grown woman searching for perspective on bad relationships."

Mariel Concepcion from Billboard felt that "not much has changed musically for Keyshia Cole since her breakthrough 2005 debut. Like that set, Just like You is rife with sincere lyrics about troubled relationships paired with soaring vocals and top-notch production." Kefela Sanneh, writing for The New York Times, found that songs on the album sounded "rather mild, and maybe even constricting," but found that Just like You was still a "likable and well-sung album; Ms. Cole may be incapable of making any other kind." Christian Hoard from Rolling Stone called the album "a work of engaging, pop-wise R&B. The beats stick mostly to jumpy keyboard bounce with string stabs and other minor adornments. The ballads are rarely more than snoozy. Cole is at her best when she gives love a kick in the pants. She is not Mary J. Blige yet, but she certainly sounds older than her years." In her review for The Boston Globe, Joan Anderman wrote that the "songstress could have used a good editor on her second album, which is bogged down by too many ballads and overly lush production. But even though Just Like You doesn't match the raw, anthemic power of her 2005 debut, The Way It Is, Cole's a singer to be reckoned with, particularly in an urban market saturated with imitators." Entertainment Weekly's Neil Drumming felt that "Cole still traffics in heartache. But whereas The Way It Is relied on raw hip-hop beats, Just Like You drips with treacly strings and piano. This counterintuitive lushness smothers Cole's modest wail on cuts like "Heaven Sent." The album's best tracks are its barest."

== Commercial performance ==
One week after its release, Just Like You debuted at number two on the US Billboard 200 behind Rascal Flatts's Still Feels Good (2007) and at the top of Billboard's official Top R&B/Hip-Hop Albums chart, with first week sales of 281,419 copies that was more than quadruple the first week of her debut album. By December 2007, the album had shipped 1,000,000 copies in the United States and was certified platinum by the Recording Industry Association of America (RIAA). Just Like You went on to finish 87th on the Billboard 200 and 19th on Billboard's 2007 Top R&B/Hip-Hop Albums year-end chart. As of 2010, the album has sold 1,700,000 copies in the United States.

== Track listing ==
Just like You track listing
No.	Title	Writer(s)	Producer(s)	Length
1.	"Let It Go" (featuring Missy Elliott and Lil' Kim)	Keyshia Cole; Cainon Lamb; Jack Knight; James Mtume; Kimberly Jones; Melissa Elliott	Missy Elliott; Lamb^{[A]}	3:58
2.	"Didn't I Tell You" (featuring Too $hort)	Cole; Andrew Harr; Jermaine Jackson; Todd Shaw	The Runners; Ron Fair^{[B]}	3:51
3.	"Fallin' Out"	Cole; Carsten Schack; Kenneth Karlin; Tammie L. Harris	Soulshock & Karlin; Fair^{[B]}	4:27
4.	"Give Me More"	Cole; Scott Storch	Storch; Fair^{[B]}	3:53
5.	"I Remember"	Cole; Greg Curtis	Curtis	4:20
6.	"Shoulda Let You Go" (featuring Amina Harris)	Cole; Rodney Jerkins	Jerkins; Fair^{[B]}	3:40
7.	"Heaven Sent"	Cole; Alex Francis; Jason Farmer	Lex; J-Vibe; Fair^{[C]}	3:52
8.	"Same Thing (Interlude)"	Cole; Cliff Brown; Tony Rey	Brown; Rey	1:35
9.	"Got to Get My Heart Back"	Cole; Gene McFadden; John Whitehead; Victor Carstarphen	Fair; Pete Rock^{[D]}	4:17
10.	"Was It Worth It?"	Cole; Adonis Shropshire; Bryan-Michael Cox; Kendrick Dean	Cox; WyldCard^{[A]}; Shropshire^{[B]}	3:36
11.	"Just Like You"	Cole; Shawn Carroll	Carroll; Fair^{[B]}	4:06
12.	"Losing You" (featuring Anthony Hamilton)	Cole; Charles Jackson; Frederick Taylor; Jesse Dixon; Marvin Yancy	Toxic; Donald Alford	3:49
13.	"Last Night" (featuring Diddy)	Cole; Knight; Mario Winans; Sean Combs; Shannon Lawrence	Winans; Diddy^{[A]}; Slam^{[B]}	4:15
14.	"Work It Out"	Cole; Chanz Parkman; J. Wells	J. Wells; Parkman^{[A]}	4:04
15.	"Let It Go (Remix)" (featuring Missy Elliott, Young Dro and T.I.)	Cole; Lamb; Knight; Mtume; Jones; Elliott	Elliott; Lamb^{[A]}	3:40

US iTunes edition
No.	Title	Writer(s)	Producer(s)	Length
16.	"Trust" (bonus track)	Cole; Taylor	Toxic; Ron Fair	4:25

International deluxe edition
No.	Title	Writer(s)	Producer(s)	Length
1.	"Let It Go" (featuring Missy Elliott and Lil' Kim)	Keyshia Cole; Cainon Lamb; Jack Knight; James Mtume; Kim Jones; Melissa Elliott	Missy Elliott; Lamb^{[A]}	3:58
2.	"Last Night" (featuring Diddy)	Cole; Knight; Mario Winans; Sean Combs; Sahnnon Lawrence	Winans; Diddy^{[A]}; Slam^{[B]}	4:15
3.	"(When You Gonna) Give It Up to Me" (with Sean Paul)	Sean Henriques; Donovan Bennett; Nigel Staff	Bennett	4:04
4.	"Love"	Cole; Curtis; Fair	Fair	4:19
5.	"Fallin' Out"	Cole; Carsten Schack; Kenneth Karlin; Tammie L. Harris	Soulshock & Karlin; Fair^{[B]}	4:27
6.	"Was It Worth It?"	Cole; Adonis Shropshire; Bryan-Michael Cox; Kendrick Dean	Cox; WyldCard^{[A]}; Shropshire^{[B]}	3:36
7.	"I Changed My Mind"	Cole; Kanye West; John Legend	West	3:23
8.	"I Remember"	Cole; Greg Curtis	Curtis	4:20
9.	"I Should Have Cheated"	Daron Jones; Quinnes Parker	Jones	5:28
10.	"Heaven Sent"	Cole; Alex Francis; Jason Farmer	Lex; J-Vibe; Fair^{[C]}	3:52
11.	"You've Changed"	Cole; Fair; Leonard Huggins; Rich Shelton	Shelton; Kevin Veney; Loren Hill; Fair^{[B]}	4:17
12.	"Situations" (featuring Chink Santana)	Cole; Francesca Richards; Andre Parker	Santana; Fair^{[B]}	4:46
13.	"Shoulda Let You Go" (featuring Amina Harris)	Cole; Rodney Jerkins	Jerkins; Fair^{[B]}	3:40
14.	"Give Me More"	Cole; Scott Storch	Storch; Fair^{[B]}	3:53
15.	"Let It Go (Remix)"	Cole; Lamb; Knight; Mtume; Jones; Elliott	Elliott; Lamb^{[A]}	3:40
16.	"Love, I Thought You Had My Back"	Cole; Randolph Murph; Ralph Eskridge; Clarence Johnson Jr; Frederick Taylor	Toxic; Fair	4:10

UK edition
No.	Title	Writer(s)	Producer(s)	Length
1.	"Let It Go" (featuring Missy Elliott and Lil' Kim)	Keyshia Cole; Cainon Lamb; Jack Knight; James Mtume; Kim Jones; Melissa Elliott	Missy Elliott; Lamb^{[A]}	3:58
2.	"(When You Gonna) Give It Up to Me" (with Sean Paul)	Sean Henriques; Donovan Bennett; Nigel Staff	Bennett	4:04
3.	"Didn't I Tell You" (featuring Too $hort)	Cole; Andrew Harr; Jermaine Jackson; Todd Shaw	The Runners; Ron Fair^{[B]}	3:51
4.	"Fallin' Out"	Cole; Carsten Schack; Kenneth Karlin; Tammie L. Harris	Soulshock & Karlin; Fair^{[B]}	4:27
5.	"Give Me More"	Cole; Scott Storch	Storch; Fair^{[B]}	3:53
6.	"I Should Have Cheated"	Daron Jones; Quinnes Parker	Jones	5:28
7.	"I Remember"	Cole; Greg Curtis	Curtis	4:20
8.	"Shoulda Let You Go" (featuring Amina Harris)	Cole; Rodney Jerkins	Jerkins; Fair^{[B]}	3:40
9.	"Heaven Sent"	Cole; Alex Francis; Jason Farmer	Lex; J-Vibe; Fair^{[C]}	3:52
10.	"Same Thing (Interlude)"	Cole; Cliff Brown; Tony Rey	Brown; Rey	1:35
11.	"Got to Get My Heart Back"	Cole; Gene McFadden; John Whitehead; Victor Carstarphen	Fair	4:17
12.	"Was It Worth It?"	Cole; Adonis Shropshire; Bryan-Michael Cox; Kendrick Dean	Cox; WyldCard^{[A]}; Shropshire^{[B]}	3:36
13.	"Just Like You"	Cole; Shawn Carroll	Carroll; Fair^{[B]}	4:06
14.	"Losing You" (featuring Anthony Hamilton)	Cole; Charles Jackson; Frederick Taylor; Jesse Dixon; Marvin Yancy	Toxic; Donald Alford	3:49
15.	"Last Night" (featuring Diddy)	Cole; Knight; Mario Winans; Sean Combs; Sahnnon Lawrence	Winans; Diddy^{[A]}; Slam^{[B]}	4:15
16.	"Work It Out"	Cole; Chanz Parkman; J. Wells	J. Wells; Parkman^{[A]}	4:04
17.	"Let It Go (Remix)" (featuring Missy Elliott, Young Dro and T.I.)	Cole; Lamb; Knight; Mtume; Jones; Elliott; D'Juan Hart; Clifford Harris Jr.	Elliott; Lamb^{[A]}	3:40

Notes and sample credits

- ^{^[A]} denotes co-producer
- ^{^[B]} denotes vocals producer
- ^{^[C]} denotes additional producer
- ^{^[D]} denotes uncredited producer
- "Let It Go" samples "Juicy Fruit" performed by Mtume.
- "Got to Get My Heart Back" contains excerpts from "She's Only a Woman" performed by The O'Jays.
- "Losing You" contains excerpts from "Sorry" performed by Natalie Cole.

== Charts ==
=== Weekly charts ===
Weekly chart performance for Just like You
Chart (2007)	Peak position
Canadian Albums (Nielsen SoundScan)	49
Japanese Albums (Oricon)	34
UK Albums (Official Charts)	149
UK R&B Albums (Official Charts)	14
US Billboard 200	2
US Indie Store Album Sales (Billboard)	2
US Top R&B/Hip-Hop Albums (Billboard)	1

=== Year-end charts ===
2007 year-end chart performance for Just like You
Chart (2007)	Position
US Billboard 200	87
US Top R&B/Hip-Hop Albums (Billboard)	19

2008 year-end chart performance for Just like You
Chart (2008)	Position
US Billboard 200	36
US Top R&B/Hip-Hop Albums (Billboard)	4

== Certifications ==
Certifications for Just like You
Region	Certification	Certified units/sales
New Zealand (RMNZ)	Gold	7,500^{‡}
United Kingdom (BPI)	Silver	60,000^{‡}
United States (RIAA)	Platinum	1,700,000
^{‡} Sales+streaming figures based on certification alone.

== Release history ==
List of release dates, showing region, formats, and label
Region	Date	Format(s)	Label
Netherlands	September 24, 2007	CD; digital download	Imani; Geffen
United Kingdom	September 24, 2007	CD; digital download	Imani; Geffen
United States	September 25, 2007	CD; digital download	Imani; Geffen
Canada	September 25, 2007	CD; digital download	Imani; Geffen
Brazil	October 8, 2007	CD; digital download	Imani; Geffen
Italy	October 24, 2007	CD; digital download	Imani; Geffen
New Zealand	November 8, 2007	CD; digital download	Imani; Geffen
Singapore	November 8, 2007	CD; digital download	Imani; Geffen
Japan	November 8, 2007	CD; digital download	Imani; Geffen
European Union	November 8, 2007	CD; digital download	Imani; Geffen
Germany		CD; digital download	Imani; Geffen
Thailand	May 9, 2008	CD; digital download	Imani; Geffen
Austria	May 9, 2008	CD; digital download	Imani; Geffen
Switzerland	May 9, 2008	CD; digital download	Imani; Geffen
Australia	November 27, 2008		
