= Heaven Sent (Keyshia Cole song) =

Single by Keyshia Cole

from the album Just Like You
- Released: March 2, 2008
- Genre: R&B
- Length: 3:52
- Label: Imani; Geffen
- Songwriters: Keyshia Cole; Jason Farmer; Alex Francis; Lamont Wilson
- Producers: Alex Francis; Jason Farmer

Keyshia Cole singles chronology
"I Got a Thang for You" (2008)	"Heaven Sent" (2008)	"Boyfriend/Girlfriend" (2008)

Heaven Sent is a song recorded by American singer Keyshia Cole. It was written by Cole, Jason Farmer, Alex Francis, and Lamont Wilson for her second studio album Just like You (2007), while production was overseen by Francis and Farmer with additional credit by Ron Fair. The ballad was released as the album's fourth and final single in March 2008. "Heaven Sent" became Cole's third chart topper on the US Hot R&B/Hip-Hop Songs and earned two Grammy Award nominations for Best Female R&B Vocal Performance and Best R&B Song. An accompanying music video was shot in Hawaii and is based on the poem "Footprints."

== Background ==
"Heaven Sent" was written by Cole, Jason Farmer, Alex Francis, and Lamont Wilson. The lyrics of the ballad were inspired by Cole's cousin.

== Chart performance ==
The song became Cole's third number one on the US Billboard Hot R&B/Hip-Hop Songs chart. "Heaven Sent" remained nine consecutive weeks atop the chart. The song also peaked at number 28 on the US Billboard Hot 100. Billboard ranked the song fourth on its Hot R&B/Hip-Hop Songs year-end chart in 2008.

== Music video ==
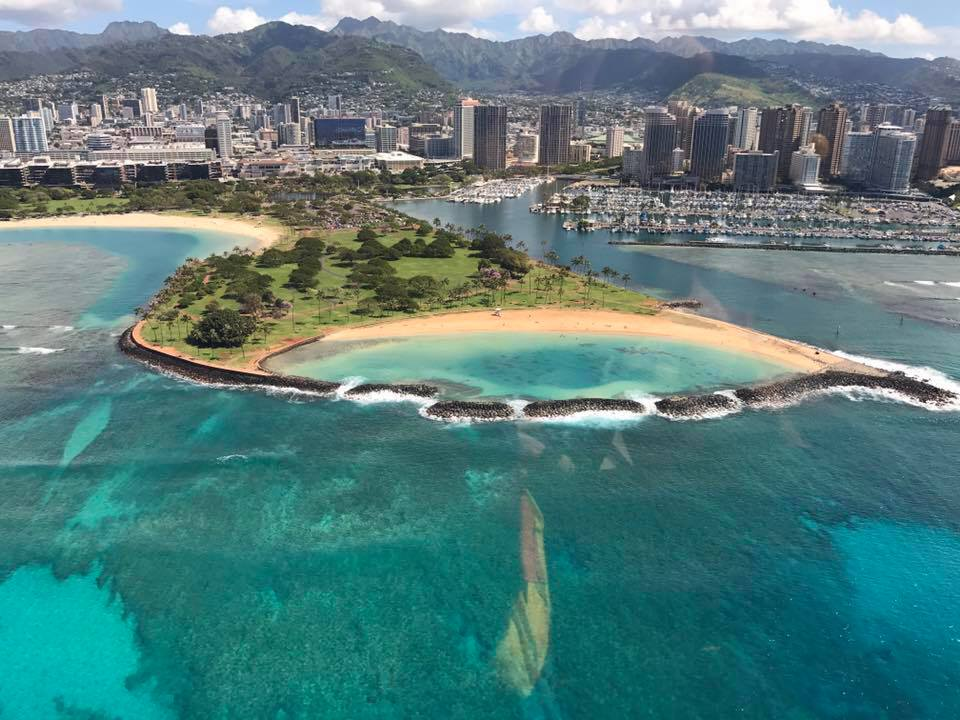
The music video for "Heaven Sent" was filmed in various locations on the Hawaiian Island Oahu.

Cole consulted frequent collaborator, director Benny Boom, to film a music video for "Heaven Sent." The visuals were filmed on March 4, 2008 in Oahu, Hawaii and features Cole singing alone on a beach and in a jungle by a waterfall. Also seen are panoramic shots of a farm with horses and a barn. Cole cited the allegorical religious poem "Footprints in the Sand" as an inspiration for the clip. "Heaven Sent" premiered on March 19, 2008, on Yahoo! Music and BET's Access Granted. It peaked at number one on May 8, 2008 on 106 & Park.

== Credits and personnel ==
Credits adapted from the liner notes of Just like You.

- Keyshia Cole – vocals, writer
- Dru Castro – recording engineer
- Torrance Esmond – assistant recording engineer
- Ron Fair – arranger, additional producer
- Jason Farmer – producer, writer
- Alex Francis – producer, writer
- Tal Herzberg – engineer
- Peter Mokran – mixing engineer
- Eric Weaver – assistant mixing engineer
- Lamont Wilson – writer

== Charts ==
=== Weekly charts ===
Chart (2008)	Peak position
US Billboard Hot 100	28
US Hot R&B/Hip-Hop Songs (Billboard)	1
US Rhythmic Airplay (Billboard)	29

Chart (2026)	Peak position
Nigeria Bubbling Under Hot 100 (TurnTable)	24

=== Year-end charts ===
Chart (2008)	Position
US Billboard Hot 100	99
US Hot R&B/Hip-Hop Songs (Billboard)	4
Chart (2009)	Position
US Hot R&B/Hip-Hop Songs (Billboard)	78

== See also ==
- List of number-one R&B singles of 2008 (U.S.)
