= Let It Go (Keyshia Cole song) =

Single by Keyshia Cole featuring Missy Elliott and Lil' Kim

from the album Just Like You and Ms. G.O.A.T.
- Released: June 19, 2007
- Length: 3:58 (album version/radio edit); 5:15 (single version)
- Label: Imani; Geffen
- Songwriters: Keyshia Cole; Kimberly Jones; Melissa Elliott; Jack Knight; Cainon Lamb; James Mtume
- Producer: Missy Elliott

Keyshia Cole singles chronology
"Dreamin'" (2007)	"Let It Go" (2007)	"Shoulda Let You Go" (2007)

Lil' Kim singles chronology
"Whoa" (2006)	"Let It Go" (2007)	"Download" (2009)

Missy Elliott singles chronology
"Love Me or Hate Me" (remix) (2006)	"Let It Go" (2007)	"Ching-a-Ling" (2008)

Music video
- "Let It Go" on YouTube

"Let It Go" is a song by American R&B singer Keyshia Cole featuring American rappers Missy Elliott and Lil' Kim. It was written by Cole, Jack Knight, Cainon Lamb, Lil' Kim, and Missy Elliott for her second album Just Like You (2007) and samples "Juicy Fruit" by Mtume, and "Don't Stop the Music" by Yarbrough and Peoples, while also interpolating "Juicy" by The Notorious B.I.G., who also sampled "Juicy Fruit." An uptempo song, "Let It Go" was written by all three artists with Jack Knight, Cainon Lamb and James Mtume and produced by Lamb and Elliott.

Released as the album's lead single, it debuted at number 74 on the Billboard Hot 100 on the issue date of July 7, 2007, and peaked at number 7, becoming Cole's third top ten hit single altogether and first top ten Billboard Hot 100 single as a lead artist. It also became Cole's first number-one hit on the R&B/Hip-Hop Songs chart. It was nominated for a Grammy Award for Best Rap/Sung Collaboration at the 50th annual ceremony, held in February 2008. "Let It Go" was ranked 59th on Rolling Stone's list of the 100 Best Songs of 2007. The single sold over two million copies in the US and was certified platinum by the Recording Industry Association of America (RIAA).

== Background ==
"Let It Go" was written and produced by rapper Missy Elliott and originally intended for singer Fantasia Barrino's self-titled second album (2007). A song about female empowerment and failed relationships that talks about "letting go" of a relationship if one partner is not there for the other, and is not interested in showing love or respect, it failed to make the final tracklisting. After Elliott played the song to Cole she decided she wanted to record it for her sophomore album. On their collaboration, Elliott later said: "I tried to hurry up past it cause I felt Keyshia wouldn't want it. She said she wanted to work with me and I really didn't know what kind of direction she wanted to go in. But as soon as the chords came on she was like, 'Wait-wait-wait stop! Stop!' She was like all, who record is that? I was like, well [Fantasia] had too many records on her album so I couldn't take it. And she wanted it."

Rapper 50 Cent disclosed in an interview with radio station Hot 97 that "Let It Go" was also offered to R&B singer Olivia who picked "Cherry Pop", another track written by Elliot instead. Lil' Kim appears on the record to pay homage to Biggie, as the song is similar to his 1994 hit single "Juicy" which also contains excerpts from Mtume's 1983 song "Juicy Fruit." Elliott also produced the official "Let It Go" remix that features vocals by rappers T.I. and Young Dro instead of Lil' Kim. It was also included on the Just Like You album as the final track. Another remix featuring rapper Busta Rhymes and extended verses by Lil' Kim leaked in 2011. An extended version of the song that runs for 5 minutes and 15 seconds which has Lil Kim's full verse was released on the single. This version was not used for the album or video.

== Chart performance ==
Upon its release, "Let It Go" became Cole's highest-charting single as a lead artist. Her only solo top ten hit on the US Billboard Hot 100, it peaked at number 7. "Let It Go" also reached number one the Hot R&B/Hip-Hop Songs chart, becoming Cole's first song to do so, and entered the top three of the Rhythmic Songs chart. Billboard ranked the song 65th on the Billboard Hot 100 year-end chart and twelfth on the Hot R&B/Hip-Hop Songs year-end chart in 2007. On December 6, 2007, "Let It Go" was certified platinum by the Recording Industry Association of America (RIAA).

== Music video ==
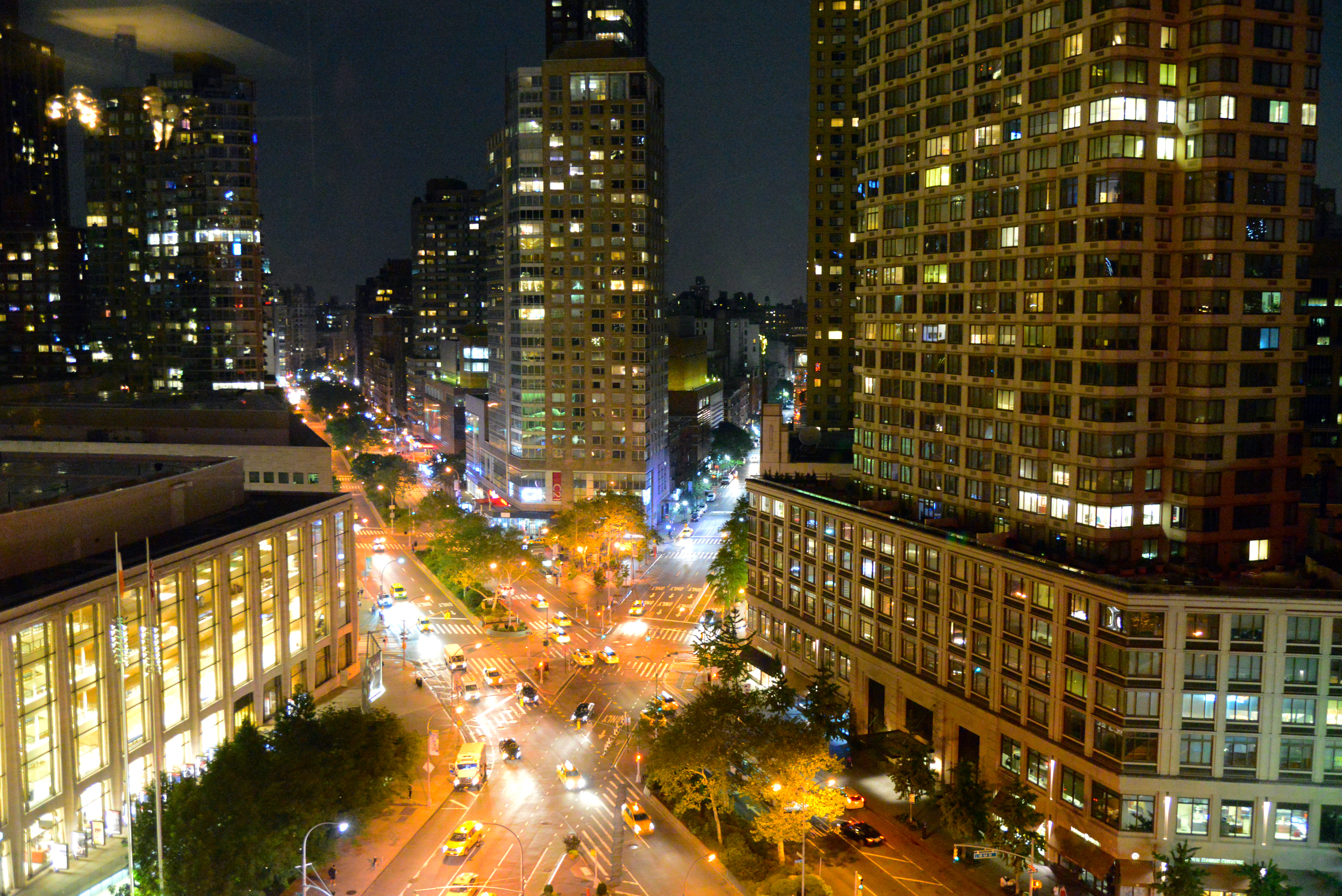
Benny Boom directed the video for "Let It Go" which was largely filmed in Manhattan, New York City.

Cole reunited with director Benny Boom, director of several videos from her The Way It Is era, to produce a visual for "Let It Go." Filming took place at the Manhattan nightspots Guesthouse and Home in New York City on June 22, 2007. Rappers Angie Martinez and Fat Joe make cameo appearances in the video. When asked about the treatment of the video, Cole explained in an interview with MTV News that "the concept of the video was you know, I'm chillin' at home, I just want to go out, they want me to go out, so I go out. I go do my thing and have a good time, basically. It's a party concept: This is what you need to do when you hear this song come on at the club. That's what you need to do with this record: Let it go."

== Track listings ==
UK CD single
No.	Title	Writer(s)	Producer(s)	Length
1.	"Let It Go" (UK remix featuring Missy Elliott & Lil Kim)	Keyshia Cole; Kimberly Jones; Melissa Elliott; Jack Knight; Cainon Lamb; James Mtume	Elliott; Lamb^{[a]}	3:13
2.	"Let It Go" (instrumental)	Cole; Jones; Elliott; Knight; Lamb; Mtume	Elliott; Lamb^{[a]}	5:03
3.	"Let It Go" (house mix)	Cole; Jones; Elliott; Knight; Lamb; Mtume	Curtis; Elliott^{[a]}; K-Klass^{[b]}	6:25

Sample credits

- "Let It Go" contains excerpts from "Juicy Fruit" as performed by Mtume.

Notes

- ^{^[a]} signifies co-producer
- ^{^[b]} signifies additional producer

== Credits and personnel ==
Credits adapted from the liner notes of Just like You.

- Scott Berger-Felder – assistant engineer
- Keyshia Cole – vocals, writer
- Melissa Elliott – producer, vocals, writer
- Paul Falcone – engineer
- Jack Knight – writer
- Cainon Lamb – co-producer, writer
- Lil' Kim – vocals, writer
- Prince Maestro – keys
- James Mtume – writer (sample)
- Taurian Osborne – keys
- Soul Diggaz – DJ scratches

== Charts ==
=== Weekly charts ===
Weekly chart performance for "Let It Go"
Chart (2007)	Peak position
Canada CHR/Top 40 (Billboard)	39
Germany (GfK)	72
Germany Urban (DBC)	12
Netherlands Urban (MegaCharts)	3
US Billboard Hot 100	7
US Hot R&B/Hip-Hop Songs (Billboard)	1
US Pop Airplay (Billboard)	29
US Rhythmic Airplay (Billboard)	3

=== Year-end charts ===
2007 year-end chart performance for "Let It Go"
Chart (2007)	Position
US Billboard Hot 100	65
US Hot R&B/Hip-Hop Songs (Billboard)	12
US Rhythmic (Billboard)	16

2008 year-end chart performance for "Let It Go"
Chart (2008)	Position
Germany Urban (DBC)	157
US Hot R&B/Hip-Hop Songs (Billboard)	85

== Certifications ==
Region	Certification	Certified units/sales
New Zealand (RMNZ)	Platinum	30,000^{‡}
United Kingdom (BPI)	Silver	200,000^{‡}
United States (RIAA)	Platinum	1,000,000^{^}
^{^} Shipments figures based on certification alone.^{‡} Sales+streaming figures based on certification alone.

== See also ==
- List of number-one R&B singles of 2007 (U.S.)
