= Access Granted =

- Genre: Documentary
- Country of origin: United States
- Original language: English

Production
- Running time: 30 minutes

Original release
- Network: BET
- Release: July 2001 – October 2009

Access Granted is an American television series that features an in-depth look at the planning, filming and production of R&B and hip-hop music videos. Each week a different artist and their new music video are featured, with the video premiering at the end of the episode. The series aired from 2001 to 2009 on BET.

One of its earlier episodes featured the last footage of singer Aaliyah, who filmed her video "Rock the Boat" in the Bahamas before her death in a plane crash on August 25, 2001. The episode, and the video, premiered on October 9, 2001.
