= The Way It Is 20th Anniversary Tour =

2025–2026 concert tour by Keyshia Cole

- Tour by Keyshia Cole
- Promotional poster
- Location: North America; Europe
- Associated album: The Way It Is
- Start date: July 1, 2025
- End date: January 18, 2026
- No. of shows: 30
- Supporting acts: Tink; Wale; Fridayy; Jeremih; Lil' Kim; Jadakiss; T-Pain; SWV; Amerie; Elijah Blake; Keri Hilson; Silk
- Producer: AEG Presents; Free Lunch

Keyshia Cole concert chronology
- Love Hard Tour (2024); The Way It Is 20th Anniversary Tour (2025-2026)

The Way It Is 20th Anniversary Tour was a concert tour by American singer Keyshia Cole, celebrating the 20th anniversary of her debut studio album, The Way It Is (2005). Presented by AEG Presents and Free Lunch, the tour was announced in April 2025 and initially included 25 dates across North America and Europe. It began on July 1, 2025, at CFG Bank Arena in Baltimore and concluded its European leg on September 26 at Utilita Arena Birmingham in Birmingham.

The tour featured supporting performances by Tink, Wale, Fridayy and Jeremih on select dates, while Lil' Kim, Jadakiss and T-Pain appeared as special guests at designated shows. Following the European dates, Cole announced six additional U.S. performances for January 2026, billed as the tour's final leg. The concert originally scheduled for July 9, 2025, at Coca-Cola Coliseum in Toronto was canceled.

== Background ==
In April 2025, Cole announced the tour in celebration of the 20th anniversary of The Way It Is, which was originally released on June 21, 2005. The tour was presented by AEG Presents and Free Lunch, with the North American dates scheduled to begin in Baltimore on July 1 and conclude in Los Angeles on August 8. A European leg was announced for September, with concerts in Paris, Amsterdam, London, Manchester and Birmingham.

In a statement accompanying the announcement, Cole said, "I'm so grateful to be celebrating The Way It Is 20 years later with the fans who have been with me since day one. This album changed my life, and being able to take it on the road — from city to city, country to country — is truly a full circle moment, and blessing."

The anniversary coincided with the album's first vinyl release since its original release in 2005. The 20th-anniversary edition was issued as a double LP on black vinyl and in a limited-edition Rose Garden Pink Translucent variant through A&M and Universal Music Enterprises. It was released on June 20, 2025, one day before the album's anniversary.

The initial announcement named Tink, Wale, Fridayy and Jeremih as supporting performers on select dates. Lil' Kim was announced for the Lincoln, California, concert and all European dates, while Jadakiss and T-Pain were scheduled to appear at the Brooklyn and Greensboro concerts, respectively.

In November 2025, Cole announced six additional performances in January 2026, describing the dates as the final leg of the anniversary tour. The additional concerts began on January 9 at Yaamava' Theater in Highland, California, and concluded on January 18 at The Hall at Live! Casino & Hotel Maryland in Hanover, Maryland.

== Concert synopsis ==
The opening concert took place at CFG Bank Arena in Baltimore on July 1, 2025. According to a review by Tonya Caver of Parklife DC, Cole entered a darkened stage before appearing on a large heart-shaped platform. Wearing pink, she performed songs from her catalogue, including "(I Just Want It) to Be Over", "I Should Have Cheated" and "You've Changed".

The Baltimore concert also featured a surprise appearance by Silk, who performed "Meeting in My Bedroom" and "Freak Me". Cole closed the show with "Love", joining the audience and sharing the microphone as concertgoers sang along.

At the July 26 concert at Dickies Arena in Fort Worth, the stage featured a telephone booth, a chain-link fence and a large heart-shaped platform. Cole appeared wearing a denim top, silver-studded shorts and knee-high boots, accompanied by a live band consisting of drums, guitar and piano, as well as backing vocalists. The performance opened with "Guess What?" and included a drumline during "I Changed My Mind".

During the Fort Worth performance, Cole invited BigXthaPlug onstage, where he performed "2AM" and "The Largest". Cole later changed into a red bodysuit with feathered chaps for performances of "Last Night" and "Enough of No Love". The concert concluded with "Love", accompanied by red and white confetti.

== Critical reception ==
The tour received coverage from music and local publications. Reviewing the opening-night concert in Baltimore, Tonya Caver of Parklife DC described the audience as a "nearly sold-out crowd" and wrote that Cole's entrance on the heart-shaped stage and accompanying lighting effects "drove the arena wild". Caver also highlighted the surprise appearance by Silk and the audience participation during "Love".

Aria Bell of the Dallas Observer reviewed the July 26 concert at Dickies Arena, describing the audience's response to Cole's performance of "I Should've Cheated" and the staging of the show. Bell noted that the crowd sang along to "Love" as the house lights came up and confetti fell. During the performance, Cole told the audience, "20 years in this motherfucker, I really appreciate you!"

== Set list ==
The following set list is from the opening concert at CFG Bank Arena in Baltimore on July 1, 2025. It is not intended to represent every performance throughout the tour.

1. "Guess What?"
2. "(I Just Want It) to Be Over"
3. "I Changed My Mind"
4. "Love, I Thought You Had My Back"
5. "Never"
6. "Superstar"
7. "We Could Be"
8. "You've Changed"
9. "Down and Dirty"
10. "I Should Have Cheated"
11. "Last Night" (Diddy cover)
12. "Enough of No Love"
13. "I Remember"
14. "Heaven Sent"
15. "Trust"
16. "Trust and Believe"
17. "Shoulda Let You Go"
18. "Let It Go"
19. "Love"

During the Baltimore concert, Silk performed a surprise set between Cole's two sets, including "Meeting in My Bedroom", "If You (Lovin' Me)" and "Freak Me".

== Commercial performance ==
Pollstar's September 2025 global box-office report recorded the July 12 concert at Barclays Center in Brooklyn as having sold all 11,037 available tickets. The show grossed $871,219, with ticket prices ranging from $20 to $253.50.

Reported box-office performances
Date	Venue	Tickets sold	Gross	Ticket prices
July 12, 2025	Barclays Center	11,037 / 11,037	$871,219	$20–$253.50

== Tour dates ==
The original North American and European itinerary was announced in April 2025. The January 2026 dates were announced as the tour's final leg.

List of concerts
Date	City	Country	Venue
July 1, 2025	Baltimore	United States	CFG Bank Arena
July 2, 2025	Philadelphia	United States	Wells Fargo Center
July 5, 2025	Chicago	United States	United Center
July 6, 2025	Cleveland	United States	Rocket Arena
July 9, 2025	Toronto	Canada	Coca-Cola Coliseum (Note: The concert was canceled.)
July 10, 2025	Detroit	United States	Little Caesars Arena
July 12, 2025	Brooklyn	United States	Barclays Center
July 13, 2025	Newark	United States	Prudential Center
July 16, 2025	Greensboro	United States	First Horizon Coliseum
July 17, 2025	Birmingham	United States	Legacy Arena
July 19, 2025	Tampa	United States	Amalie Arena
July 20, 2025	Hollywood	United States	Hard Rock Live
July 22, 2025	Atlanta	United States	State Farm Arena
July 23, 2025	New Orleans	United States	Smoothie King Center
July 25, 2025	Houston	United States	Toyota Center
July 26, 2025	Fort Worth	United States	Dickies Arena
July 31, 2025	Oakland	United States	Oakland Arena
August 1, 2025	Las Vegas	United States	T-Mobile Arena
August 2, 2025	Lincoln	United States	The Venue at Thunder Valley
August 8, 2025	Los Angeles	United States	Crypto.com Arena
September 19, 2025	Paris	France	Adidas Arena
September 21, 2025	Amsterdam	Netherlands	AFAS Live
September 23, 2025	London	United Kingdom	The O2 Arena
September 25, 2025	Manchester	United Kingdom	AO Arena
September 26, 2025	Birmingham	United Kingdom	Utilita Arena Birmingham
January 9, 2026	Highland	United States	Yaamava' Theater
January 10, 2026	Las Vegas	United States	Encore Theater
January 11, 2026	Las Vegas	United States	Encore Theater
January 15, 2026	Boston	United States	MGM Music Hall at Fenway
January 16, 2026	Wallingford	United States	Toyota Oakdale Theatre
January 18, 2026	Hanover	United States	The Hall at Live! Casino & Hotel Maryland
