= Barbershop 2: Back in Business (soundtrack) =

BarberShop 2: Back in Business Soundtrack

Soundtrack album by Various artists
- Released: February 3, 2004
- Recorded: 2003
- Genres: Hip hop; R&B
- Length: 57:11
- Label: Interscope
- Producers: Anita Camarata (exec.); George Tillman Jr. (exec.); Kevin Rodney Sullivan (exec.); Robert Teitel (exec.); Ron Gillyard (exec.); Ron Fair; Daroc; Dr. Dre; E-Poppi; Havoc; Keshon; Knobody; Kon Artis; Lil' Jon; Limitless; Megahertz; Mýa; Organized Noize; Polow da Don; Soul Diggaz; Stereotypes; Stizzle; The Neptunes

Singles from Barbershop 2: Back in Business
- 1. "Not Today" Released: March 3, 2004; 2. "Never" Released: March 23, 2004; 3. "Precious Love" Released: 2004; 4. "Things Come & Go" Released: 2004

Professional ratings
Review scores
Source	Rating
AllMusic	4/5 stars
RapReviews	6.5/10 stars

BarberShop 2: Back in Business Soundtrack is the soundtrack to Kevin Rodney Sullivan's 2004 comedy film Barbershop 2: Back in Business. It was released on February 3, 2004 through Interscope Records and consists of hip hop and R&B music. The album peaked at number 18 on the Billboard 200, at number 8 on the Top R&B/Hip-Hop Albums chart and at number 1 on the Top Soundtracks chart in the United States.

== Track listing ==
No.	Title	Producer(s)	Length
1.	"Not Today" (performed by Mary J. Blige & Eve)	Dr. Dre	3:45
2.	"I Can't Wait" (performed by Sleepy Brown & Outkast)	Organized Noize	4:34
3.	"Fallen (Zone 4 Remix)" (performed by Mýa & Chingy)	Polow da Don	3:17
4.	"Pussy" (performed by the Clipse)	The Neptunes	3:47
5.	"Never" (performed by Keyshia Cole & Eve)	Erroll "Poppi" McCalla, Jr.; Ron Fair	4:04
6.	"Unconditionally" (performed by G-Unit)	Megahertz	3:40
7.	"All" (performed by Olivia)	Lil' Jon; Ky Miller (add.); Sha Money XL (add.)	3:25
8.	"Things Come and Go" (performed by Mýa & Sean Paul)	Knobody; Mýa; Ron Fair	3:58
9.	"Wanna B Where U R (Thisizzaluvsong)" (performed by Floetry & Mos Def)	Darren "Limitless" Henson; Keith "Keshon" Pelzer	4:01
10.	"Barbershop" (performed by D12)	Kon Artis	4:21
11.	"One of Ours" (performed by Mobb Deep)	Havoc	3:16
12.	"Private Party" (performed by Olivia)	Soul Diggaz; King Klay (co.)	3:02
13.	"On the Weekend" (performed by Morgan Smith & 3LW)	Daune "Daroc" Smith	3:47
14.	"Make It Home" (performed by Christopher "Spitfiya" Lanier & Anthony Hamilton)	Stereotypes	5:03
15.	"Precious Love" (performed by Avant & Keke Wyatt)	Stizzle	3:11
Total length:			57:11

Notes

- Track 5 contains sampled portions of "Never Too Much" by Luther Vandross
- Track 6 contains elements from "Tappan Zee" by Bob James
- Track 7 contains an interpolation of "Damn!" by YoungBloodZ
- Track 8 contains excerpts from "Aht Uh Mi Hed" by Shuggie Otis
- Track 9 contains samples from "School Boy Crush" by Average White Band
- Track 13 contains sampled portions from "Weekend Girl" by The S.O.S. Band
- Track 14 contains sampled portions of "Shine" by Lamont Dozier

== Charts ==
Chart (2004)	Peak position
US Billboard 200	18
US Top R&B/Hip-Hop Albums (Billboard)	8
US Top Soundtracks (Billboard)	1
