= (I Just Want It) To Be Over =

Single by Keyshia Cole

from the album The Way It Is
- Released: April 5, 2005
- Label: A&M
- Songwriters: Keyshia Cole; Kerry Brothers; Alicia Keys; Taniesha Smith
- Producer: Kerry "Krucial" Brothers

Keyshia Cole singles chronology
"I Changed My Mind" (2004)	"(I Just Want It) To Be Over" (2005)	"I Should Have Cheated" (2005)

"(I Just Want It) To Be Over" is a song by American singer Keyshia Cole. It was written by the singer along with Alicia Keys, Taniesha Smith, and Kerry "Krucial" Brothers for her debut album, The Way It Is (2005). Production on the song was helmed by the latter. Released by A&M Records on April 5, 2005 as the album's second single, "(I Just Want It) To Be Over" became a moderate success on the US Billboard Hot R&B/Hip-Hop Songs chart, peaking at number 30. It also reached number one on the Bubbling Under Hot 100 Singles chart, which acts as an extension to the Hot 100.

== Background ==
"(I Just Want It) To Be Over" was written by Cole along with Alicia Keys, Taniesha Smith, and Kerry "Krucial" Brothers for her debut album, The Way It Is (2005), with the latter also serving as the song's producer. The song was inspired by Cole's personal experience of finding out that the man she was in a relationship with was married, with the lyrics reflecting her desire to leave him and the experience behind as quickly as possible.

== Commercial performance ==
"(I Just Want It) To Be Over" was issued by A&M Records as the album's second single on April 5, 2005. A mediocre commercial success, it peaked at number 30 on the US Billboard Hot R&B/Hip-Hop Songs chart. The song also reached number one on Billboard's Bubbling Under Hot 100 Singles chart, which acts as an extension to the Billboard Hot 100.

== Music video ==
A music video for "(I Just Want It) To Be Over" was directed by Benny Boom and produced by Anke Thommen for F.M. Rocks. It starts with Cole sitting on a bed, singing the first verse. She tries numerous times to escape the room she is locked in. She then breaks a mirror with a chair and steps through the mirror frame. The next scene shows broken glass on the floor. Cole is then seen wearing a sun dress. As she walks down a hall she sees a man and two women in the room; when she approaches the next room she spots a man and a woman arguing. Cole walks into a nightclub in a black tank top and mini skirt, and performs the song with a band. The video ends by showing a montage of the preceding events.

== Track listings ==
Digital single
No.	Title	Length
1.	"(I Just Want It) To Be Over" (main version)	3:47
2.	"(I Just Want It) To Be Over" (instrumental)	3:47

== Credits and personnel ==
Credits adapted from the liner notes of The Way It Is.

- Kerry "Krucial" Brothers – producer, writer
- Keyshia Cole – writer
- Ron Fair – additional vocal producer
- Alicia Keys – vocal producer, writer
- Dave Pensado – mixing engineer
- Taniesha Smith – writer

== Charts ==
Chart performance for "(I Just Want It) To Be Over"
Chart (2005)	Peak position
US Bubbling Under Hot 100 (Billboard)	1
US Hot R&B/Hip-Hop Songs (Billboard)	30
