= 2006 Soul Train Music Awards =

Music awards ceremony in Pasadena, US

Soul Train Music Awards
- Date: March 18, 2006
- Location: Pasadena Conference Center; Pasadena, California
- Country: United States
- Hosted by: Vivica A. Fox and Tyrese Gibson
- First award: 1987

Highlights
- Most awards: John Legend (3)
- Website: soultrain.com

Television/radio coverage
- Network: BET

The 2006 Soul Train Music Awards were held on March 18, 2006 at the Pasadena Conference Center in Pasadena, California and was hosted by Vivica Fox and Tyrese. The show marked the 20th Anniversary of the Soul Train Music Awards.

== Special awards ==
=== Quincy Jones Award for Outstanding Career Achievements – Female ===
- Destiny's Child

=== Quincy Jones Award for Outstanding Career Achievements – Male ===
- Jamie Foxx

=== Stevie Wonder Award for Outstanding Achievement in Songwriting ===
- R. Kelly

=== Sammy Davis, Jr. Award for "Entertainer of the Year" ===
- John Legend

== Winners and nominees ==
Winners are in bold text.

=== Best R&B/Soul Album – Male ===
- **John Legend – Get Lifted**
  - Anthony Hamilton – Soulife
  - R. Kelly – TP.3 Reloaded
  - Marques Houston – Naked

=== Best R&B/Soul Album – Female ===
- **Mariah Carey – The Emancipation of Mimi**
  - Keyshia Cole – The Way It Is
  - Faith Evans – The First Lady
  - Fantasia – Free Yourself

=== Best R&B/Soul Album – Group, Band or Duo ===
- **The Black Eyed Peas – Monkey Business**
  - 112 – Pleasure & Pain
  - Earth, Wind & Fire – Illumination
  - Mint Condition – Livin' the Luxury Brown

=== Best R&B/Soul Single – Male ===
- **John Legend – "Ordinary People"**
  - Chris Brown (featuring Juelz Santana) – "Run It!"
  - Bobby Valentino – "Slow Down"
  - Charlie Wilson – "Charlie, Last Name Wilson"

=== Best R&B/Soul Single – Female ===
- **Mariah Carey – "We Belong Together"**
  - Keyshia Cole – "I Should Have Cheated"
  - Alicia Keys – "Unbreakable"
  - Gwen Stefani – "Hollaback Girl"

=== Best R&B/Soul Single – Group, Band or Duo ===
- **Destiny's Child – "Cater 2 U"**
  - Floetry (featuring Common) – "Supastar"
  - Pussycat Dolls (featuring Busta Rhymes) – "Don't Cha"
  - Nina Sky (featuring Pitbull) – "Turnin' Me On"

=== The Michael Jackson Award for Best R&B/Soul or Rap Music Video ===
- **Kanye West (featuring Jamie Foxx) – "Gold Digger"**
  - Common – "Testify"
  - Missy Elliott (featuring Ciara and Fat Man Scoop) – "Lose Control"
  - Lil Wayne – "Fireman"

=== The Coca-Cola Classic Award for Best R&B/Soul or Rap New Artist ===
- **Chris Brown**
  - Leela James
  - Lyfe Jennings
  - Bobby Valentino

=== The Sprite Award for Best R&B/Soul or Rap Dance Cut ===
- **Missy Elliott (featuring Ciara and Fat Man Scoop) – "Lose Control"**
  - The Black Eyed Peas – "My Humps"
  - Gwen Stefani – "Hollaback Girl"
  - Kanye West (featuring Jamie Foxx) – "Gold Digger"

=== Best Gospel Album ===
- **Donnie McClurkin – Psalms, Hymns & Spiritual Songs**
  - Kurt Carr Project – One Church
  - Kirk Franklin – Hero
  - CeCe Winans – Purified

== Performers ==
- The Black Eyed Peas
- John Legend
- Chris Brown
- Pussycat Dolls and Avant
- Keyshia Cole
- Charlie Wilson
- Flipsyde
