= Errol McCalla Jr. =

American songwriter, producer, multi-instrumentalist

- Also known as: Poppi, EPoppi
- Born: Houston, Texas, United States
- Genres: R&B; soul; hip-hop
- Occupations: Ssongwriter; producer; multi-instrumentalist
- Labels: EMI Music Publishing

Errol McCalla Jr., also known as "Poppi", is an American songwriter, producer, and multi-instrumentalist, best known for his work with Destiny's Child ("8 Days of Christmas"), Tamia ("Long Distance Love"), and Missy Elliott ("Pussycat"), among others. His work on Elliott's 2002 album Under Construction was nominated for Album of the Year at the 46th Annual Grammy Awards in 2004.

== Songwriting and production credits ==
Credits are courtesy of Discogs, Tidal, Genius, and AllMusic.

Title	Year	Artist	Album
"Long Distance Love"	2000	Tamia	A Nu Day
"Can't No Man"	2000	Tamia	A Nu Day
"Dot"	2000	Destiny's Child	Charlie's Angels: Music from the Motion Picture
"8 Days of Christmas"	2001	Destiny's Child	8 Days of Christmas
"Rudolph the Red-Nosed Reindeer"	2001	Destiny's Child	8 Days of Christmas
"Dangerously in Love"	2001	Destiny's Child	Survivor
"Love Me Not" (Unreleased)		Destiny's Child	Survivor
"Hold My Beer" (Unreleased)		Destiny's Child	Survivor
"In Love With Love" (Unreleased)		Destiny's Child	Survivor
"Dot" (The E-Poppi Mix)"	2002	Destiny's Child	This Is the Remix
"Pussycat"	2002	Missy Elliott	Under Construction
"This Feeling"	2002	Truth Hurts	Truthfully Speaking
"Dangerously in Love 2"	2003	Beyoncé	Dangerously in Love
"Always"	2003	Melissa Schuman	Love Don't Cost a Thing: The Soundtrack
"We Could Be"	2005	Keyshia Cole	The Way It Is
"Never" (Featuring Eve)	2005	Keyshia Cole	The Way It Is
"Back To The Music"	2005	Vanessa Brown	Back To The Music
"Golden"	2011	Yolanda Adams	Becoming
"Living Proof"	2011	Yolanda Adams	Becoming
"What Would You Do"	2011	Yolanda Adams	Becoming
"Overwhelmed"	2011	Yolanda Adams	Becoming
"Gotta Tell Ya"	2011	Yolanda Adams	Becoming

== Awards and nominations ==
Year	Awarding Body	Award	Result	Ref
2004	46th Annual Grammy Awards	Grammy Award for Album of the Year (Under Construction)	Nominated	
2004	SESAC Awards	R&B/Hip-Hop Award Recipients ("Pussycat")	Won	
