= Love (Keyshia Cole song) =

2006 song by Keyshia Cole

Single by Keyshia Cole

from the album The Way It Is
- Released: January 6, 2006
- Genre: R&B
- Length: 4:15
- Label: A&M
- Songwriters: Keyshia Cole; Greg Curtis
- Producer: Greg Curtis

Keyshia Cole singles chronology
"I Should Have Cheated" (2005)	"Love" (2006)	"(When You Gonna) Give It Up to Me" (2006)

Music video
- "Love" on YouTube

"Love" is a song by American singer-songwriter Keyshia Cole, written alongside producer Greg Curtis for her debut studio album The Way It Is (2005). The song was released on January 6, 2006, as the album's fourth and final single and emerged as the most successful single from the album. It peaked at number 19 on the US Billboard Hot 100 chart and number three on the Hot R&B/Hip-Hop Songs chart, becoming her breakthrough record and preceding a string of modestly successful singles, also receiving platinum certification by the RIAA.

== Background ==
"Love" was written by Cole along with producer Greg Curtis. When she moved to Los Angeles in pursuit of a record deal, "Love" was the track that she thought stood the best chance of getting her signed to a label. When she met with A&M Records President Ron Fair, she performed the song, and Fair signed Cole on the spot. Lyrically, "Love" tells the story of a girl who is always trying to do her best for her boyfriend, even though she believes that she is never good enough. The song describes the boyfriend's infidelity and Cole's struggle to believe it because she is madly in love with him. In 2025, Cole admitted that she originally disliked the song and was still unsure whether that has changed.

== Chart performance ==
Issued by A&M Records as the album's fourth and final single, "Love" became Cole's breakthrough record after a string of modestly successful singles. The song debuted on the US Billboard Hot 100 at number 82 and rose to number 49 in its second week, becoming the chart's "Greatest Gainer." It slowly moved up the charts with minor setbacks, and eventually reached position 19, becoming Cole's most successful solo charting single up to then until her 2007 song "Let It Go" reached position seven. "Love" also peaked at number three on the Hot R&B/Hip-Hop Songs chart. Billboard ranked 18th on its 2006 R&B/Hip-Hop Songs year-end chart. "Love" was eventually certified platinum by the Recording Industry Association of America (RIAA).

== Music video ==
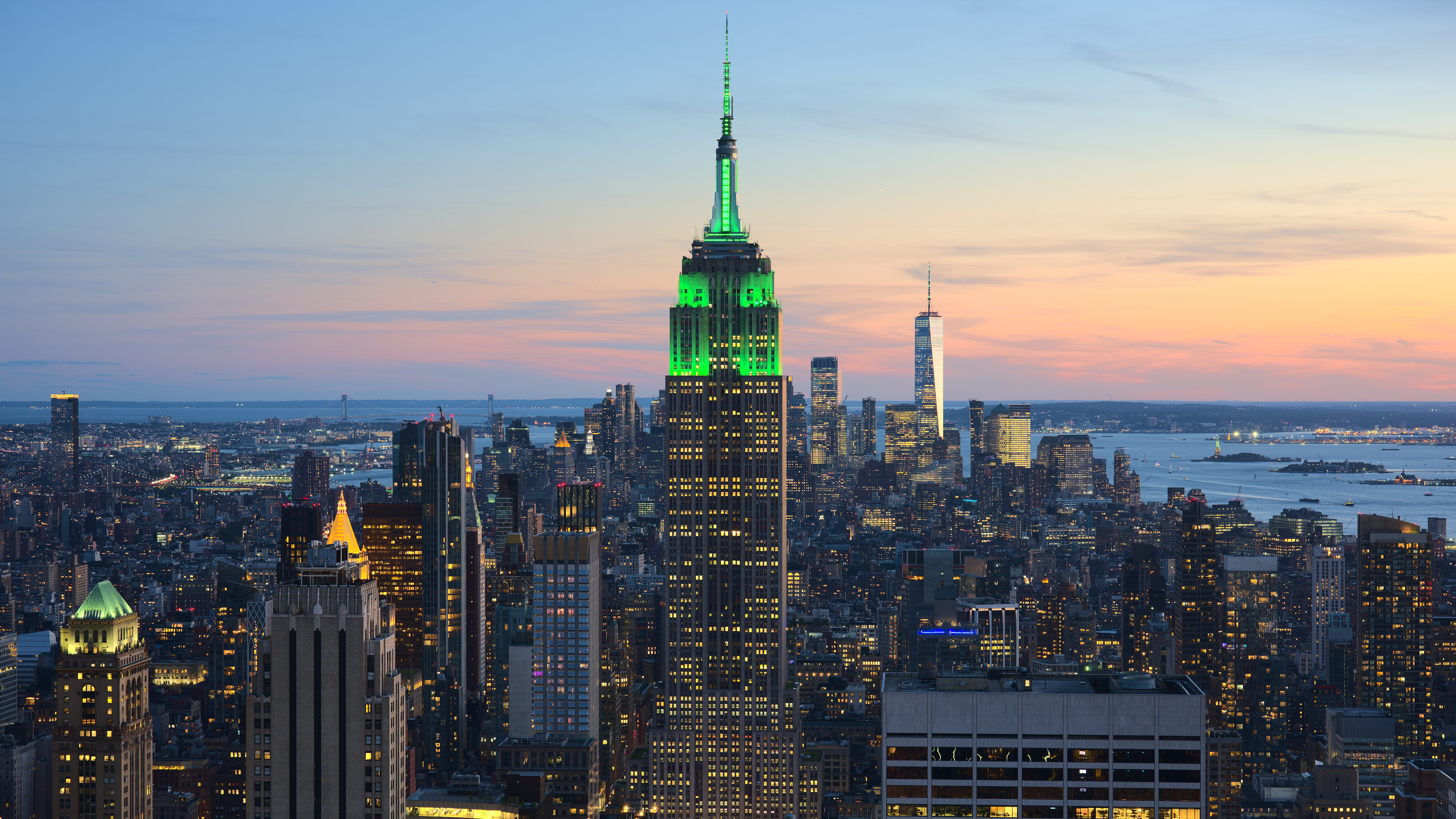
The video for "Love," directed by Benny Boom, was largely filmed in New York City.

An accompanying music video for "Love" was directed by Benny Boom and produced by Roger Urbina for F.M. Rocks. R&B singer Tyrese appears as Cole's boyfriend in the video which was largely shot in various New York City locations. Frequently aired on BET's countdown show, 106 and Park, the video made the countdown for 65 days before it was retired on April 19, 2006.

The clip opens with police pulling over Cole and Tyrese for allegedly running a red light, which Cole denies. Tyrese seems to lead a double life—though Cole suspects he's a criminal, she doesn't confront him due to his affectionate behavior. Later, she sees a news report showing Tyrese involved in a bank robbery. After a day of lavish shopping, Cole is questioned by authorities about his whereabouts. Tyrese picks her up, and they return to the opening scene—this time, the officer recognizes Cole and asks for her autograph. She confronts Tyrese, and he promises to leave crime behind to be with her, which she accepts.

== Track listings ==
CD single
No.	Title	Producer(s)	Length
1.	"Love" (radio edit)	Greg Curtis; D. Elliott^{[a]}; Ron Fair^{[a]}; Tal Herzberg^{[a]}	3:46
2.	"Love" (LP version)	Curtis; Elliott^{[a]}; Fair^{[a]}; Herzberg^{[a]}	4:15
3.	"Love" (a cappella)	Curtis; Elliott^{[a]}; Fair^{[a]}; Herzberg^{[a]}	3:58
4.	"Love" (instrumental)	Curtis; Elliott^{[a]}; Fair^{[a]}; Herzberg^{[a]}	4:22

Notes

- ^{^[a]} signifies an additional producer

== Credits and personnel ==
Credits adapted from the liner notes of The Way It Is.

- J.D. Andrew – engineer
- Ariel Choraz – assistant engineer
- Keyshia Cole – writer
- Greg Curtis – engineer, producer, writer
- D. Elliott – additional producer
- Ron Fair – additional producer, engineer
- Tal Herzberg – additional producer, engineer
- Dave Pensado – engineer

== Charts ==
=== Weekly charts ===
2006 weekly chart performance for "Love"
Chart (2006)	Peak position
US Billboard Hot 100	19
US Hot R&B/Hip-Hop Songs (Billboard)	3
US Rhythmic Airplay (Billboard)	7

2013 weekly chart performance for "Love"
Chart (2013)	Peak position
South Korea (Gaon)	71

2023 weekly chart performance for "Love"
Chart (2023)	Peak position
US Digital Song Sales (Billboard)	40
US R&B/Hip-Hop Digital Songs (Billboard)	8

=== Year-end charts ===
Chart (2006)	Position
US Billboard Hot 100	93
US Hot R&B/Hip-Hop Songs (Billboard)	18

== Certifications ==
Region	Certification	Certified units/sales
New Zealand (RMNZ)	3× Platinum	90,000^{‡}
United Kingdom (BPI)	Gold	400,000^{‡}
United States (RIAA) Mastertone	Platinum	1,000,000^{*}
^{*} Sales figures based on certification alone.^{‡} Sales+streaming figures based on certification alone.
