= Vickie Natale =

American singer (born 1985)

Vickie Lynn Natale (born December 20, 1985, in Brooklyn, New York) is an American singer, best known as a winner on CBS's version of the Star Search television program in 2003.

A native of Brooklyn, New York, she grew up in a single-parent home.

Early in 2002, while performing at the Sugar Bar, owned by songwriters Ashford & Simpson, Vickie was approached by a CBS Star Search casting director. She became the winner of the 2003 Star Search Adult Competition, and was invited back to Star Search in 2004 to compete in its Winner's Circle Competition.

In 2011 Vickie auditioned for the test pilot of The Next: Fame Is at Your Doorstep and was chosen by Dave Broome and Queen Latifah to play herself in the pilot, which never aired.

== Album/Song Releases ==
2004 Vickie released her first major label single "Like no other" on A&M Records Co-written with pianist and producer John Rule Beasley and executive-produced by Ron Fair.

2004 Recorded 5 songs with Sony records which were never released due to creative differences.

2005 Vickie released, "Never Gonna Stop"" which includes the song "Forbidden Love" co-written with producer Narada Michael Walden.

2015 Released 7 song album "Time Machine" co-written with Producer David Veslocki.

== Performance Appearances ==
2nd annual Grammy Brunch - performed a tribute to Chaka Khan at the request of music lawyer L. Londell McMillan and the Artist Empowerment Coalition (a non profit coalition, founded by Prince, Stevie Wonder, Roberta Flack, Alicia Keys and many other industry professionals).

Carnegie Hall May 10, 2004 - performed in a concert entitled "New Faces of '04"

Stadium of Fire May 25, 2005 - opened for country artist Reba McEntire

Lincoln Center April 10, 2007 - performed a live tribute to two of her mentors Ashford & Simpson
