= I Changed My Mind =

Single by Keyshia Cole

from the album The Way It Is
- Released: November 9, 2004
- Length: 3:23
- Label: A&M
- Songwriters: Keyshia Cole; Kanye West; John Stephens
- Producer: Kanye West

Keyshia Cole singles chronology
"Let's Get Blown" (2004)	"I Changed My Mind" (2004)	"(I Just Want It) To Be Over" (2005)

"I Changed My Mind" is a song by American R&B recording artist Keyshia Cole, released by Geffen Records on November 9, 2004 as the lead single for her debut album, The Way It Is (2005). It was written by the singer alongside John Legend and Kanye West, while the production was handled by the West, who acts as the song's hype man.

A modest commercial success, "I Changed My Mind" peaked at number 71 on the US Billboard Hot 100 and number 23 on the Hot R&B/Hip-Hop Songs charts. It also reached the top ten of the UK R&B Singles chart. A remix to the song features then-incarcerated rapper Shyne; this version made its way to radio airplay. Cole first performed "I Changed My Mind" during West's set on Usher's Truth Tour (2004). Visuals for "I Changed My Mind" were directed by Nzingha Stewart and filmed in Cole's hometown, Oakland, California.

== Background ==
"I Changed My Mind" was written by Keyshia Cole, John Legend, and Kanye West, with the latter also serving as the song's producer. Cole wrote the song's verses and Legend wrote the bridge, while West wrote the vocals and produced the track. Legend performs backing vocals, while West acts as song's hype man. West built "I Changed My Mind" on a sample of American rapper Dr. Dre's song "The Chronic" (1992) which in turn samples Solomon Burke's "Get Out of My Life, Woman" (1992). Cole initially disliked the song. Rapper Shyne later claimed that he was removed from the album version.

As with most of her subsequent songs, Cole wrote this about an ex-boyfriend. As her boyfriend has another girl on the side, he does not pay attention to Cole. She finds out about her, and "changes her mind", that she doesn't want to be with him anymore. In a May 2005 interview with Jet magazine, Cole elaborated on "I Changed My Mind": "That song was actually about being focused and dedicated to what you want and what you're trying to be. It's about the things you're trying to accomplish in life and dealing with somebody, a significant other, who comes in between that, especially with their ways."

== Chart performance ==
"I Changed My Mind" was released by Geffen Records on November 9, 2004 as the lead single from Cole's debut album, The Way It Is (2005). The song debuted on the US Billboard Hot 100 at number 72, the highest debut of all Cole's singles. As a CD single release, it achieved "greatest retail gainer" status for two weeks. The song lingered in the bottom quarter of the Hot 100 for 2 months, eventually peaking at number 71. It also peaked at number 23 on the US Hot R&B/Hip-Hop Songs. In the United Kingdom, "I Changed My Mind" peaked at number 48 on the UK Singles Chart, but became a top ten hit on the UK R&B Singles chart.

== Music video ==
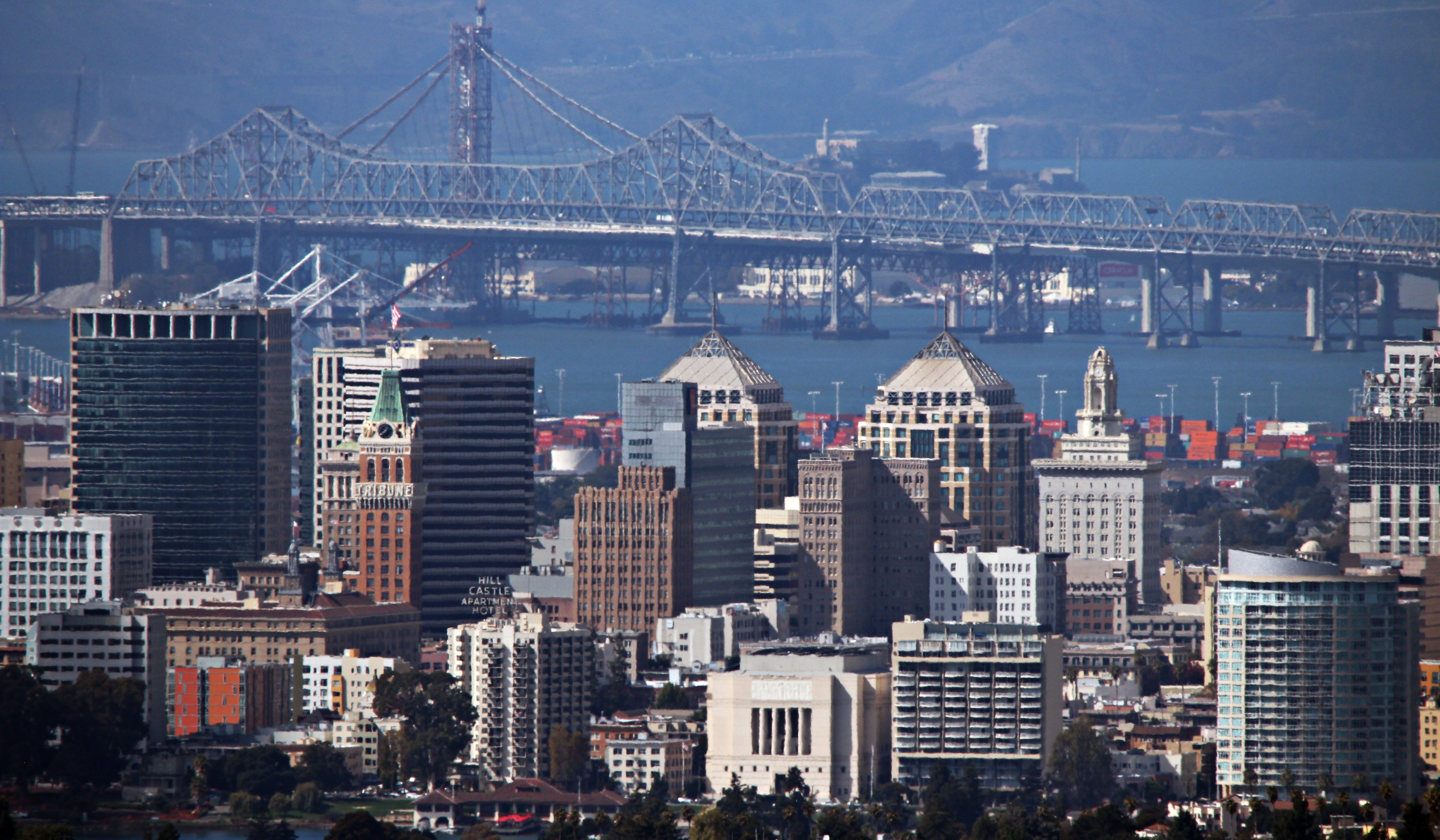
The music video for "I Changed My Mind" was filmed in Cole's hometown, Oakland, California.

The music video for "I Changed My Mind" was directed by Nzingha Stewart and filmed in Cole's hometown, Oakland, California on June 30, 2004. In the beginning, the video has various screenshots of different places in the Bay Area, featuring a resemblance of fellow R&B singer Mary J. Blige's music video for her 1993 song "You Remind Me." Singer J. Valentine appears in the video as Cole's boyfriend. The visuals show her deeply in love with him, but things take a turn when she discovers his infidelity. Heartbroken and angry, she confronts him. Ultimately, she ends the relationship and swiftly moves on with her life.

The video includes an appearance by Kanye West and highlights Shyne's promotional CD More or Less. The music video for "I Changed My Mind" was first seen as the "New Joint of the Week" on BET's countdown show 106 & Park on August 13, 2004.

== Track listings ==
Digital single
No.	Title	Writer(s)	Producer(s)	Length
1.	"I Changed My Mind"	Keyshia Cole; Kanye West; John Legend	West; Fair^{[a]}; Tal Herzberg^{[a]}	3:19
2.	"I Should Have Cheated"	Daron Jones; Quinnes "Q" Parker	Jones; Fair	1:30
3.	"We Could Be"	Cole; Errol McCalla, Jr.	E-Poppi; Fair	1:30
4.	"Situations" (featuring Chink Santana)	Cole; Francesca Richards; Andre Parker	Santana; Fair^{[a]}	1:30
5.	"I Changed My Mind" (music video)

Notes

- ^{^[a]} signifies an additional producer

== Credits and personnel ==
Credits adapted from the liner notes of The Way It Is.

- Keyshia Cole – vocals, writer
- Ron Fair – additional producer
- Manny Halley – executive producer
- Tal Herzberg – additional producer, engineer
- Jun Ishizeki – engineer
- Anthony Kilhoffer – engineer
- John Legend – writer
- Dave Pensado – mixing engineer
- Kanye West – producer

== Charts ==
Chart performance for "I Changed My Mind"
Chart (2004–2006)	Peak position
Scottish Singles Sales (Official Charts)	65
UK Singles (Official Charts)	48
UK Hip Hop/R&B (Official Charts)	9
US Billboard Hot 100	71
US Hot R&B/Hip-Hop Songs (Billboard)	23
