= Never (Keyshia Cole song) =

Single by Keyshia Cole featuring Eve

from the album Barbershop 2: Back in Business and The Way It Is
- Released: March 23, 2004
- Length: 4:03
- Label: A&M
- Songwriters: Keyshia Cole; Eve Jeffers; Luther Vandross
- Producers: Errol "E-Poppi" McCalla Jr.; Ron Fair

Keyshia Cole singles chronology
"Never" (2004)	"Let's Get Blown" (2004)

"Never" is the debut solo single by American singer Keyshia Cole. Co-written by Cole and hip-hop rapper Eve, it was produced by Errol "E-Poppi" McCalla Jr. and Ron Fair. The uptempo track samples from the 1981 hit "Never Too Much" by the late R&B singer Luther Vandross and was first featured on the soundtrack to the sequel comedy film Barbershop 2: Back in Business (2004), serving as a single. Reaching number 71 on the US Hot R&B/Hip-Hop Songs chart, it was later also included on Cole's debut album The Way It Is (2005).

== Background ==
"Never" was written by Cole along with hip-hop rapper Eve. Production on the track was overseen by Errol "E-Poppi" McCalla Jr. and Ron Fair. The uptempo track samples from the 1981 song "Never Too Much," as written and performed by the late R&B singer Luther Vandross. Due to the inclusion of the sample, Vandross is also credited as a songwriter. While Eve and Cole formed a friendship during the production of "Never," an incident caused a rift. An unfamiliar woman grabbed Eve's purse, and Cole slapped the woman. Angry at Cole for interfering with a job best left for security to handle, Eve ended their friendship.

== Commercial performance ==
"Never" was first featured on the soundtrack to Don D. Scott-wrote sequel comedy film Barbershop 2: Back in Business (2004) and later also included on Cole's debut album The Way It Is (2005). One out of three songs from the Barbershop 2: Back in Business soundtrack that were issued as a single, it was released as Cole's debut single in March 2004. "Never" managed to appear on US Hot R&B/Hip-Hop Songs chart, peaking at number 71.

== Track listings ==
Digital single
No.	Title	Length
1.	"Never" (radio version featuring Eve)	4:03
2.	"Never" (instrumental)	4:04

== Credits and personnel ==
Credits adapted from the liner notes of The Way It Is.

- Shannon Braxton – recording engineer
- Keyshia Cole – vocals, writer
- Ron Fair – producer
- Tal Hertzberg – recording engineer
- Eve Jeffers – vocals, writer
- Errol "E-Poppi" McCalla Jr. – producer
- Dave Pensado – mixing engineer
- Luther Vandross – writer (sample)

== Charts ==
Chart performance for "Never"
Chart (2004)	Peak position
US Hot R&B/Hip-Hop Songs (Billboard)	71
