= Dangerously in Love (song) =

Song

Song by Destiny's Child

from the album Survivor
- Released: April 25, 2001
- Recorded: 2000
- Studio: SugarHill (Houston, Texas)
- Genre: R&B
- Length: 4:54
- Label: Columbia
- Songwriters: Beyoncé Knowles; Errol McCalla, Jr.
- Producers: Knowles; McCalla, Jr.

"Dangerously in Love 2"

Song by Beyoncé

from the album Dangerously in Love
- Released: June 20, 2003
- Recorded: 2000–2002
- Studio: SugarHill (Houston, Texas)
- Genre: R&B
- Length: 4:54
- Label: Columbia
- Songwriters: Beyoncé Knowles; Errol McCalla, Jr.
- Producers: Knowles; McCalla, Jr.

"Dangerously in Love 2" is a song written and produced by Beyoncé and Errol McCalla, Jr. The ballad was first recorded by Destiny's Child for their third studio album, Survivor (2001), under the title "Dangerously in Love". The song later became the title track to Destiny's Child member Beyoncé's debut studio album, Dangerously in Love (2003), with minor instrumental modifications. Both versions were recorded at SugarHill Recording Studios in Houston, Texas. The original version was recorded in 2000, while the re-recorded version was completed between 2000 and 2002. "Dangerously in Love" and "Dangerously in Love 2" are R&B ballads whose lyrics detail romantic obsession.

"Dangerously in Love 2" received a generally positive response from music critics, who noted that the song effectively showcases Beyoncé's vocal capabilities. It won the Grammy Award for Best Female R&B Vocal Performance at the 46th Annual Grammy Awards. Although not released as an official single, "Dangerously in Love 2" charted at number 57 on the US Billboard Hot 100 chart and at number 17 on the Hot R&B/Hip-Hop Songs chart. Beyoncé performed the ballad at the 46th Grammy Awards, on the Verizon Ladies First Tour, the Dangerously in Love Tour, The Beyoncé Experience, and as the opening number of her Renaissance World Tour.

== Background and composition ==
"Dangerously in Love" was written and produced by Beyoncé and Errol McCalla, Jr. It was recorded for the Destiny's Child album Survivor (2001). The song was rearranged at SugarHill Studios in Houston, Texas, in 2002 for her debut solo album, Dangerously in Love. Her version, titled "Dangerously in Love 2", features a modified arrangement. Originally planned as a remix track, it ultimately became the title track of her debut studio album.

"Dangerously in Love"
A sample of "Dangerously in Love", displaying Knowles's vocals toward the end of the romantic R&B ballad.

"Dangerously in Love" is a moderate R&B ballad paced in common time. It was written in the key of F♯ major and moves at a moderate tempo of 100 beats per minute. Vocal elements in the song range from E_{3} to D_{5}. "Dangerously in Love" is backed by piano and thumping drum instrumentation. Many music critics noted that it is musically similar to the original Destiny's Child version. Lyrically, the song is about being romantically obsessed, as indicated in the chorus: "I am in love with you / You set me free / I can't do this thing called life without you here with me". According to Lisa Verrico of The Times, "Dangerously in Love 2" bears resemblance to Janet Jackson's work if viewed from a "flirty" perspective.

== Reception ==
"Dangerously in Love" received mostly positive reviews from music critics. Natalie Nichols of the Los Angeles Times stated that the song is just one of many wailing ballads designed to demonstrate "the soulful bleating of Beyonce, the centerpiece of R&B star trio Destiny's Child." Sal Cinquemani of Slant Magazine gave a mixed review of the song, stating that it seemed a bit dated and that it was "a near-carbon copy of Survivor’s melodramatic 'Dangerously in Love' [that] is completely superfluous." While covering the 2004 reunion of Destiny's Child, Jet Magazine considered the song a major hit from Beyoncé's debut album. In an article from Teen Ink, the song was noted as one of the top "lush ballads" of the album. "Dangerously in Love" won in the category of Best Female R&B Vocal Performance at the 46th Grammy Awards on February 8, 2004. In 2024, Rolling Stone named the recording the third-best R&B song of the 21st century.

Beyoncé's version charted on several Billboard component charts, despite not being officially released as a single. "Dangerously in Love" made its first chart appearance on the US Hot R&B/Hip-Hop Songs chart at number 73 on July 3, 2004. For the following seven weeks, the song remained in the lower positions of the chart until it was named the greatest gainer on the chart issue dated August 21, 2004, rising 28 places from number 71 to number 43. Its entry on the US Radio Songs chart at number 75 prompted its debut on the US Billboard Hot 100 issue dated September 18, 2004, at number 76. "Dangerously in Love 2" rose to number 60 on the Hot 100 chart the following week as it made the largest jump on the Radio Songs chart by ascending to number 59. The song peaked at number 17 on the US Hot R&B/Hip-Hop Songs chart on September 25, 2004, and at number 57 on the US Billboard Hot 100 on October 2, 2004. On June 14, 2006, the song was certified gold by the Recording Industry Association of America (RIAA) for sales of over 500,000 ringtones. As of October 6, 2010, "Dangerously in Love 2" had sold approximately 130,000 digital downloads in the United States.

== Live performances ==
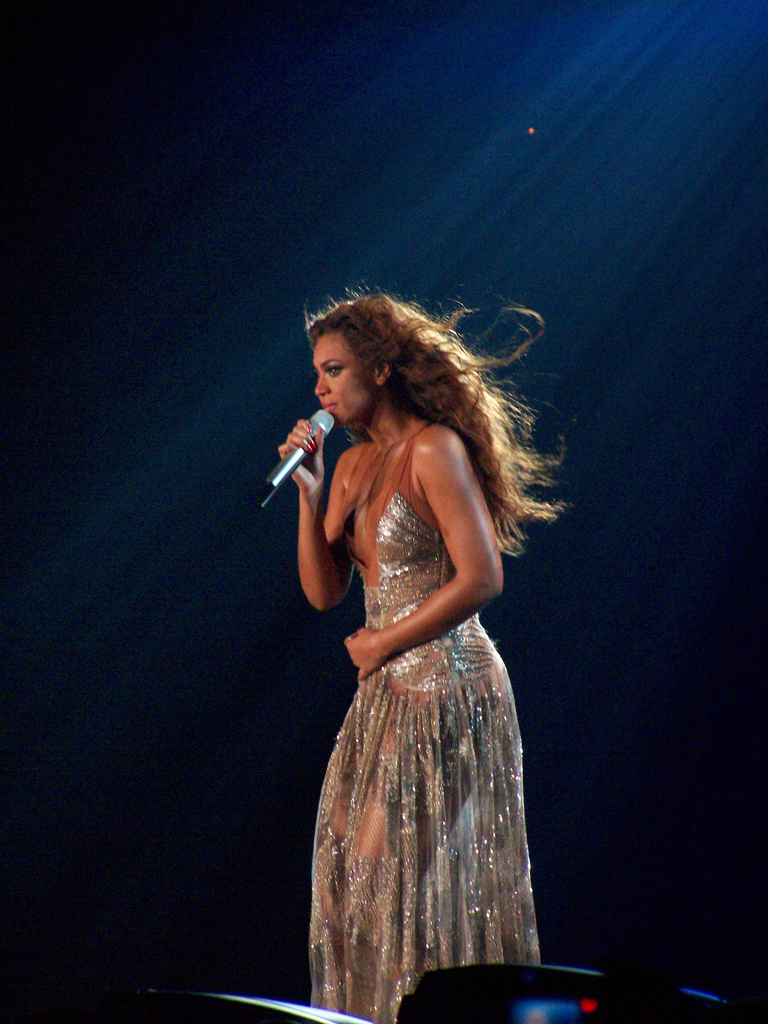
Beyoncé performing "Dangerously in Love" during The Beyoncé Experience.

Beyoncé performed "Dangerously in Love" live for the first time at the Pepsi Arena in Albany, New York, in 2001. The performance was also part of the set list for the group's World Tour. Beyoncé also prominently performed the song at the 46th Grammy Awards on February 8, 2004, where it won in the category of Best Female R&B Vocal Performance. Beyoncé wore a long, glittery turquoise and silver dress. She positioned herself between the edges of a giant picture frame and sang "Dangerously in Love 2" as if she were in a living oil painting. She was joined by seventeen backup singers, musicians, and dancers. At the end, she held out her hand and a dove landed on her outstretched palm. Jon Wiederhorn of MTV News commented that the performance was "nothing short of extravagant."

Beyoncé also added the song to the set list of her first solo tour, the Dangerously in Love Tour, notably at Wembley Arena in London, United Kingdom. There she performed a special rendition of the song that lasted well over eight minutes. During the Verizon Ladies First Tour, which also featured Alicia Keys, Missy Elliott, and Tamia, Beyoncé performed "Dangerously in Love 2" in New York City in front of more than 20,000 fans. Before starting her performance, she asked the audience whether they had ever fallen in love. As she started to sing, more dancers joined in on smaller circular platforms. Simultaneously, flames shot from the stage floor and a long rectangular screen merged video of fire with images of the performers, creating the illusion of them being engulfed in flames. Shaheem Reid of MTV News complimented the performance, writing: "[Beyoncé] had New Yorkers cheering like the Yankees had just won the World Series when she perfectly hit the high note toward the end of 'Dangerously in Love 2'."

On August 5, 2007, Beyoncé performed the song at Madison Square Garden in Manhattan. While singing, Beyoncé was accompanied by her all-female band, and she incorporated Jill Scott's "He Loves Me" into "Dangerously in Love 2". Shaheem Reid of MTV News praised the performance, writing: "For all the dancing she did, Beyoncé got an equally big — if not more resounding — response for displaying her undeniable vocal ability on the ballads [...] 'Dangerously in Love'."

Beyoncé additionally performed the song on several other occasions, including as part of her set list on The Beyoncé Experience in Los Angeles and during initial stops of the I Am... World Tour. In Los Angeles, Beyoncé gave a full-length performance of the song, dressed in a long sequined gown that flowed straight down to her feet, accompanied by male and female backup dancers and live instrumentation. Jon Pareles of The New York Times praised the performance, stating: "Beyoncé needs no distractions from her singing, which can be airy or brassy, tearful or vicious, rapid-fire with staccato syllables or sustained in curlicued melismas. But she was in constant motion, strutting in costumes [...]". Although performed on selected dates of the I Am... World Tour, the song was not included on the physical DVD/CD release. It was also performed during the I Am... Yours 2009 Las Vegas revue show in a medley that included an acoustic version of "Sweet Dreams" and a cover of Anita Baker's "Sweet Love".

After 14 years, Beyoncé performed it again as the opening song of her 2023 Renaissance World Tour.

== Credits and personnel ==
Credits taken from Dangerously in Love liner notes.

- Vocals: Beyoncé Knowles
- Background Vocals: Michelle Williams, Kelly Rowland
- Writing: Beyoncé Knowles, Errol McCalla Jr.
- Vocal Engineer: Brian Springer
- Mix engineer: Dexter Simmons
- Guitars: Dan Workman
  - Additional Guitars: John "Jab" Broussard
- Instrument Engineer: Dan Workman
- Producing: Beyoncé Knowles, Errol "Poppi" McCalla Jr.

== Charts ==
=== Weekly charts ===
| Chart (2004) | Peak position |
|---|---|
| US Billboard Hot 100 | 57 |
| US Hot R&B/Hip-Hop Songs (Billboard) | 17 |

=== Year-end charts ===
| Chart (2004) | Position |
|---|---|
| US Hot R&B/Hip Hop Songs | 75 |

== Certifications ==
| Region | Certification | Certified units/sales |
|---|---|---|
| United Kingdom (BPI) | Silver | 200,000^{‡} |
| United States (RIAA) | Platinum | 1,000,000^{‡} |
| United States (RIAA) Mastertone | Gold | 500,000^{*} |
^{*} Sales figures based on certification alone.^{‡} Sales+streaming figures based on certification alone.
