= The Way It Is (Keyshia Cole album) =

Studio album by Keyshia Cole
- Released: June 21, 2005
- Genres: R&B; hip hop soul
- Length: 48:51
- Labels: A&M; Interscope
- Producers: Ron Fair; Kerry Brothers; Gregory G. Curtis; Deisel; E-Poppi; Damon Elliott; Sean Garrett; Tal Herzberg; Loren Hill; Mix; Polow da Don; Chink Santana; Rich Shelton; Toxic; Kevin Veney; Kanye West

Keyshia Cole chronology
| The Way It Is (2005) | Just like You (2007) |

Singles from The Way It Is
- 1. "I Changed My Mind" Released: November 9, 2004; 2. "(I Just Want It) To Be Over" Released: April 5, 2005; 3. "I Should Have Cheated" Released: August 3, 2005; 4. "Love" Released: January 6, 2006

The Way It Is is the debut studio album by American singer Keyshia Cole, released on June 21, 2005, through A&M Records and Interscope Records. The album features guest appearances from Jadakiss, Chink Santana, Metro City and Eve. Cole co-wrote every song on the album, and also worked with a number of producers and writers, including Ron Fair, Sean Garrett, Kerry "Krucial" Brothers, Polow da Don, John Legend, Alicia Keys and Kanye West. The Way It Is is an R&B, hip hop and hip hop soul album. Lyrically, the album speaks of romantic relationships.

Four official singles were released from The Way It Is; all reached the top 40 of the US Hot R&B/Hip-Hop Songs. The album's lead single "I Changed My Mind" peaked at number seventy-one on the US Billboard Hot 100 and number twenty-three on the Hot R&B/Hip-Hop Songs. "(I Just Want It) To Be Over" was released as the album's second single and peaked at number thirty on the Hot R&B/Hip-Hop Songs. The third single "I Should Have Cheated" became Cole's first single to reach the top-five on the R&B/Hip-Hop Songs as well as her first single to reach the top forty of the Hot 100. The fourth single "Love" was the album's best-performing song on the Hot 100, spending nineteen weeks on the chart and becoming Cole's first top 20 hit in the US. Cole promoted the album by performing as the supporting act, for the tours by artists such as Nelly and Kanye West.

The Way It Is received generally positive reviews from music critics, who praised Cole's vocals and musical themes and compared them to the likes of fellow female R&B singer Mary J. Blige. The album enjoyed commercial success and launched Cole's career in R&B music, selling 89,000 units in its first week, while becoming one of the ten biggest-selling R&B/Hip-Hop albums of the year. In the United States, it stayed on Billboard's Top R&B/Hip-Hop Albums chart for eighty-four weeks, and was certified gold by the RIAA within seventeen weeks, and then platinum only eight weeks later. The Way It Is was Cole's longest-charting album on the Billboard 200, remaining on the chart for sixty-four weeks in total and eventually selling over 1.6 million copies. The Way It Is also garnered Cole two Soul Train Music Award nominations for Best Female R&B/Soul Album and one for the album's fourth single, "Love" for Best Female R&B/Soul Single at the 20th Soul Train Music Awards in 2006. In April 2025, Cole announced a vinyl re-release and The Way It Is 20th Anniversary Tour to mark the album's 20th anniversary.

== Background ==
Around the age of 12-13, Cole managed to convince American rapper MC Hammer into giving her a backup vocal slot and a chance to record with him. Eventually, she gained recognition into the Bay Area's hip hop and R&B scenes. She appeared on recordings by rapper Messy Marv ("Nubian Queen") and Tony! Toni! Toné! member D'wayne Wiggins (the soundtrack for the film Me and Mrs. Jones).

Once she caught her then boyfriend cheating on her with another woman, she got in her car and drove for nine hours to Los Angeles, California to further pursue her music career according to her biography page on her website. After getting an interview with him, she was signed to A&M Records by its president, Ron Fair and he later began mentoring her in 2004. While explaining her life struggles and career beginnings, Cole said, "I was 21, He signed me after he heard half a song, Ron took me to Jimmy Iovine that next week, and then 'I Changed My Mind' came out."

== Music and lyrics ==
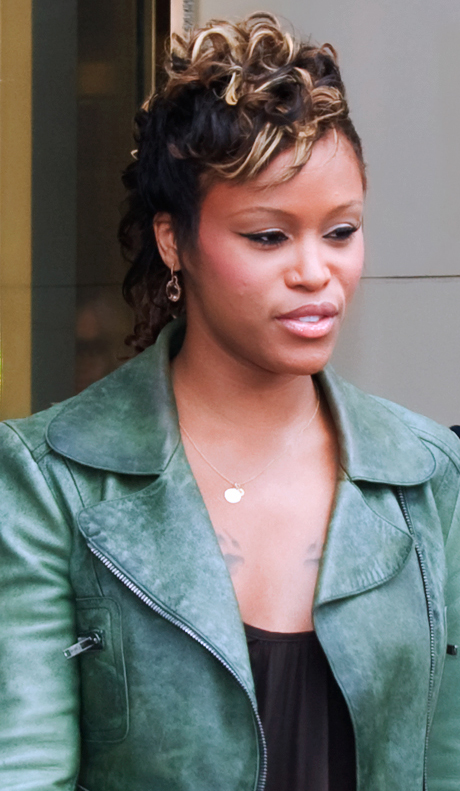
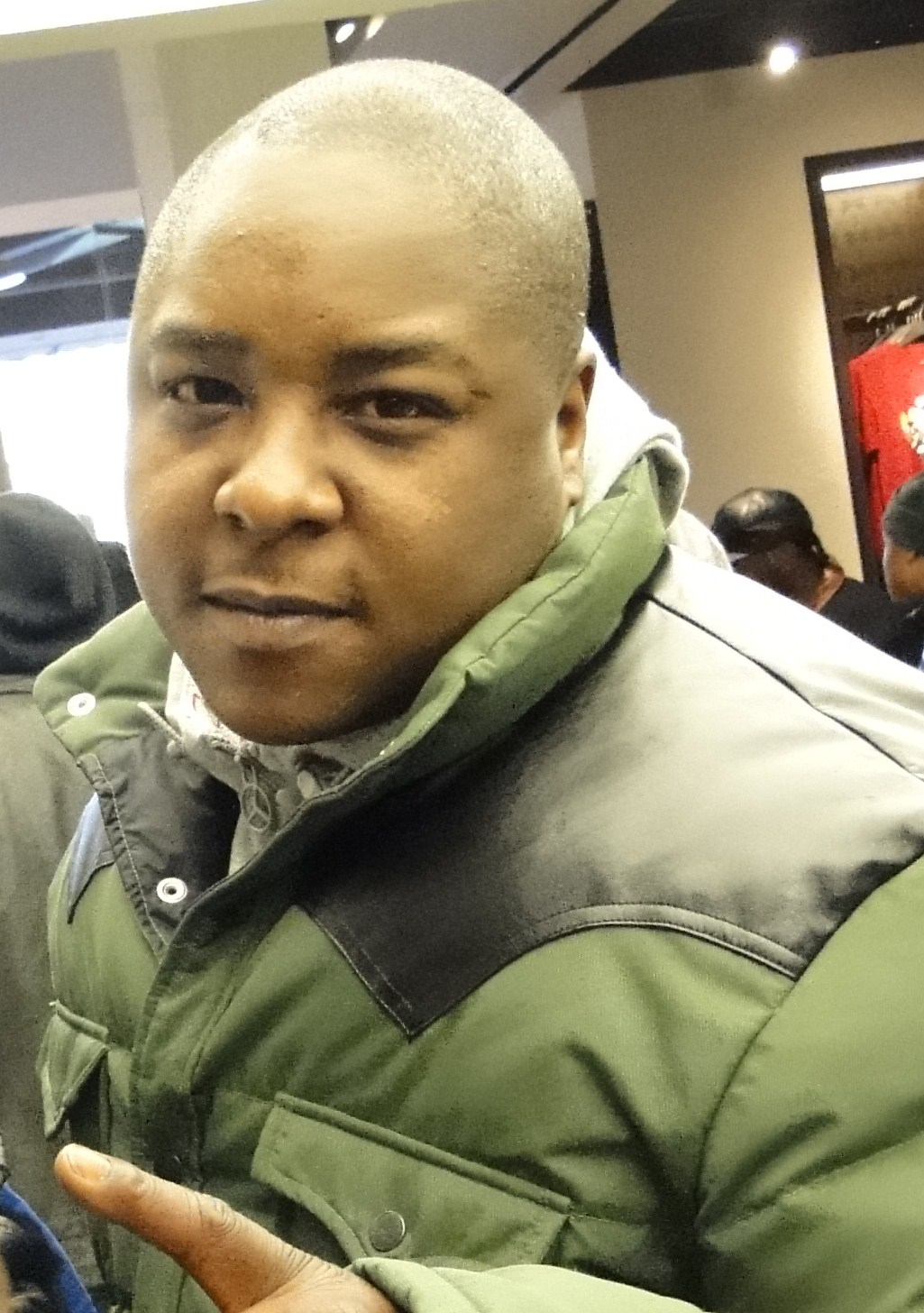
Cole collaborated with several musicians on the album. Eve (left) co-wrote and recorded vocals for "Never" while Jadakiss (right) co-wrote and recorded vocals for "Guess What?".

The Way It Is has been described as hip hop soul, hip-hop, and R&B, and is seen to be about the ugly parts of a romantic relationship. The album served as a "light at the end of the tunnel" for Cole and was the culmination of years of trials and tribulations, along with emotional drama. The lead single "I Changed My Mind" was written by Cole, John Legend, Kanye West, and was produced by West. The storyline of "I Changed My Mind" has the protagonist take back her love from an unfaithful companion. A remix of the song which features rap by Shyne, was included as a bonus track on the international edition of the album.

Cole wrote "Love" while she was at a nightclub in Malibu, California, after spotting one of her ex-boyfriends with his girlfriend at a restaurant in that city. Cole said Ron Fair initially signed her after hearing the first verse and chorus of the song, describing it as "the easiest part". The critically proclaimed "heartbreak song" of the album expresses feeling an emotion not felt before with someone and how it feels when it is felt for the very first time.

"Love" serves as the sixth track from the album, after "Guess What?", an aggressive song about Cole dumping a worthless guy who has been unfaithful to her and caused negative situations for her. "Guess What?" is a collaboration between Cole and rapper Jadakiss, which was written by the latter alongside Sean Garrett who co-produced it with Ron Fair. "You've Changed" is described by critics as a "smooth mix" of "bitter" sentiments and "sweet" soul. The song "You've Changed" samples "Song Cry" by Jay-Z. "You've Changed" was written by Cole, Leonard Huggins, Rich Shelton and Ron Fair while being produced by the latter two alongside Kevin Veney and Loren Hill. The final song, "Never", contains a sample of Luther Vandross's "Never Too Much", and features rapper Eve.

== Marketing and release ==
Following its announcement, The Way It Is was expected to be released in January 2005 but was then delayed to April 26 instead and eventually faced two more delays. In anticipation of the album's release, Cole and DJ Green Lantern released a mixtape entitled Team Invasion Presents Keyshia Cole in February 2005 featuring remixes of hip-hop instrumentals and snippets of songs from her and helped build a buzz around Cole's then-upcoming album release.

The Way It Is was released on June 21, 2005 through A&M Records in Italy, Japan, and the United States (alongside Imani Entertainment) with twelve tracks. In the album's back cover, each track name is listed in uppercase letters, a feat that would also be executed for Cole's succeeding albums. The Way It Is was also promoted with four official singles, which all reached the top forty of the Hot R&B/Hip-Hop Songs charts.

== Promotion ==
Cole's first broadcast performance of "I Changed My Mind" was on June 26, 2004 on Soul Train, marking Cole's first ever televised performance. Cole performed "I Should Have Cheated" at the Vibe Awards on November 15, 2005. She also performed the song during BET's 106 & Park's New Year's Eve special in December 2005. Cole continued to promote the album with televised live performances in 2006 in which she performed "Love" at the Soul Train Music Awards on March 4, 2006.

Cole also promoted the album by performing as an opening act for two hip hop artists' concert tours. She opened for Nelly on several dates, from April 18 to May 3, 2005, included on the Sweatsuit Tour (2005), performing a total of five songs from the album. She also served as opening act on five dates for Kanye West's Touch the Sky Tour (2005–06), performing from October 31, 2005 to February 28, 2006 on both halves of the American and European legs.

Besides televised performances and tours, Cole began doing acoustic sessions and studio performances to promote the album. In December 2005, she performed acoustic versions of six songs from the album, "I Should Have Cheated", "(I Just Want It) To Be Over", "I Changed My Mind", "Love", "Love, I Thought You Had My Back", and "We Could Be" at The Village in West Los Angeles, California.

== Singles ==
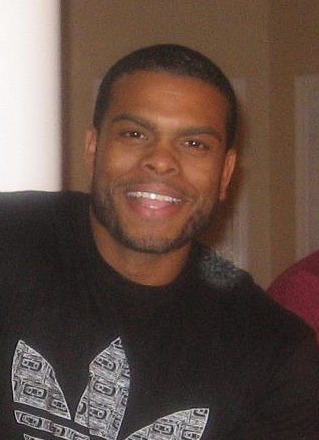
Benny Boom (pictured) directed the music videos for the last three singles.

"I Changed My Mind" was released as the lead single from The Way It Is on November 9, 2004. It was mildly successful commercially, peaking at number seventy-one on the Billboard Hot 100 and at number twenty-three on Billboard's Hot R&B/Hip-Hop Songs. The music video for the song was directed by Nzingha Stewart and was first seen as the "New Joint of the Week" on BET's 106 & Park on August 13, 2004.

"(I Just Want It) To Be Over" was released as the second single from The Way It Is. It debuted at number twenty-five on the Bubbling Under Hot 100 chart before eventually reaching number-one, though it failed to enter the Hot 100. Nevertheless, it managed to reach the top forty of the Hot R&B/Hip-Hop Songs chart peaking at number thirty, marking it Cole's second non-consecutive single to reach the top forty on that chart.

"I Should Have Cheated" was released as the third single from the album. The song was critically favored, being described as an "emotion-packed hit". "I Should Have Cheated" peaked at number thirty on the Billboard Hot 100 and spent thirteen weeks on that chart. It also became Cole's first top ten on Hot R&B/Hip-Hop Songs. The song's music video was directed by Benny Boom.

"Love" was released as the fourth and final single from the album. "Love" received critical success for its memorable chorus and instrumental, as well as commercial success by becoming the best-charting single from The Way It Is on the Billboard Hot 100, peaking at number nineteen. The song's Benny Boom-directed accompanying music video featured American singer Tyrese as Cole's love interest. It became Cole's first mainstream hit, peaking at number-one on the Mainstream R&B/Hip-Hop chart. The song was certified platinum by the RIAA for the shipment of 1,000,000 copies.

== Critical reception ==
Professional ratings
Aggregate scores
| Source | Rating |
|---|---|
| Metacritic | 77/100 |
Review scores
| Source | Rating |
| AllMusic | 4/5 stars |
| Blender | 3/5 stars |
| Robert Christgau | (2-star Honorable Mention) |
| Entertainment Weekly | B |
| Los Angeles Times | 2.5/4 stars |
| Pitchfork | 7.3/10 |
| Rolling Stone | 3.5/5 stars |
| Stylus | B |
| Vibe | 4/5 stars |

Upon its release, The Way It is garnered generally favorable reviews from music critics. At Metacritic, which assigns a rated mean out of 100 from mainstream critics, the album received a score of 77 based on 9 critic reviews. Andy Kellman of Allmusic rated the album four out of five stars. He felt that "from the opener, the album seems to be set up like a linear narrative about a crumbling relationship, but it doesn't quite play out that way, with the scenes shuffled out of order. None of it's all that profound, but Cole sells it all extremely well. [Her] voice is sweet and ringing, like a wiser version of Lil' Mo who has had to weather a tremendous amount of drama. She could be around for a while." Janet Tzou, writing for Entertainment Weekly found that "Cole certainly nails all the basics on The Way It Is: big-name guest talent and husky ballads lamenting those tricky matters of the heart. But Cole's native Oakland, California upbringing gives her vocals depth and her songs a genuine, lived-in feel."

An editor from the New York Times called "The Way It Is" an "excellent debut album". Brolin Winning of Rhapsody said that The Way It Is showcases Cole's "strong vocals" and "struggle-filled" lyricism, with "deep songs" about infidelity, heartbreak and true love. Barry Walters of Rolling Stone gave a positive review, saying that Cole "rides the album's multiple peaks with a rare mix of street smarts and chops." David Drake of Stylus said that the songs from the album "stay stuck with you like a lump in your throat". He compared her musical sound to the likes of Mary J. Blige.

Rondell Conway of Vibe wrote Cole's "ability to belt to her heart's content saves the album from its inconsistent production." Amy Linden of Village Voice declared that the album "buoys honest, rugged, unpitying good-girl-gone-wrong anthems with the de rigueur hip hop atmospherics." In a negative review, a writer for Blender said that the album's sound was "dry and straightforward disco-soul." Furthermore, a writer for E! Online felt that The Way It Is never quite "lives up" to the album it could have been.

=== Accolades ===
Critics' lists
| Publication | List | Rank | Ref. |
|---|---|---|---|
| Rolling Stone | Top 50 Records of 2005 | 41 | |
| Rolling Stone | Highest Rated R&B Albums of 2005 | —N/a | |
| The Fader | 150 More Great Albums Made By Women | 79 | |

=== Awards ===
Industry awards
| Year | Ceremony | Category | Result | Ref. |
|---|---|---|---|---|
| 2006 | Soul Train Music Awards | Best Female R&B/Soul Album | Nominated | |

== Commercial performance ==
On the week ending July 16, 2005, The Way It Is debuted at number six on the Billboard 200 with first-week sales of 89,000 copies, remaining on the chart for 64 total weeks. Additionally, The Way It Is debuted at number two on Billboard's Top R&B/Hip-Hop Albums chart and spent 84 total weeks on that chart. The album was eventually certified platinum by the Recording Industry Association of America (RIAA) on February 14, 2006 for sales exceeding one million copies. In addition to the success of the album, Cole held a "platinum party". The development of her platinum party was featured on the season finale of the reality television series Keyshia Cole: The Way It Is; during the episode, Monica, Jagged Edge and other notable musicians appeared at the party and were seen partying with Cole. As of 2010, the album has sold 1.6 million copies in the US.

In the United Kingdom, The Way It Is reached a peak position of 184 on the UK Albums Chart, signifying its reception to the European music markets. However, the album showed stronger performance on the UK R&B Albums chart, where it soared to number 17. Impressively, it maintained its presence on the R&B chart for a total of 17 weeks, indicating sustained popularity and resonating with a significant audience for an extended period.

== Legacy and impact ==
With the release of her debut album and the combined commercial success of its singles, Cole had established herself a successful solo artist. The album led her to successful endeavors post 2005 until the release of her second album Just like You (2007), including making guest appearances on several other artists' albums, songs landing on successful soundtracks for films such as Mission: Impossible III and Step Up (both in 2006), her first starring TV role in the reality television series Keyshia Cole: The Way It Is, and receiving ten non-consecutive nominations at six major award ceremonies in all. Via her Instagram page, American singer Ari Lennox named The Way It Is as "one of the most phenomenal debut albums ever", continuing with "This joint is a classic and forever cranks!" and then hashtagged four of the album's songs.

Web publication Rated R&B celebrated The Way It Is's fifteenth anniversary and highlighted its two singles "(I Just Want It) To Be Over" and "Love", along with Cole's breakthrough performance of "I Should Have Cheated" at the 2005 Vibe Awards and complimented four other songs from the album. The editor, Antwane Folk wrote about the album's lyrical content and sound, describing the songs as "bittersweet songs" and "resilient anthems". Folk later went on to call The Way It Is "a masterpiece that stands on the strength of hard work and dedication".

== Track listing ==
The Way It Is track listing
| No. | Title | Writer(s) | Producer(s) | Length |
|---|---|---|---|---|
| 1. | "(I Just Want It) To Be Over" | Keyshia Cole; Kerry Brothers Jr.; Alicia Keys; Taniesha Smith | Kerry "Krucial" Brothers; Ron Fair^{[a]} | 4:03 |
| 2. | "I Changed My Mind" | Cole; Kanye West; John Legend | West; Fair^{[b]}; Tal Herzberg^{[b]} | 3:19 |
| 3. | "Love, I Thought You Had My Back" | Cole; Randolph Murph; Ralph Eskridge; Clarence Johnson Jr; Frederick Taylor | Fair; Toxic | 4:10 |
| 4. | "I Should Have Cheated" | Daron Jones; Quinnes "Q" Parker | Jones; Fair | 5:31 |
| 5. | "Guess What?" (featuring Jadakiss) | Cole; Jason Phillips; Sean Garrett; Alexandre Da Veiga | Deisel; Sean Garrett; Fair^{[a]} | 3:45 |
| 6. | "Love" | Cole; Gregory G. Curtis | Curtis; Damon Elliott^{[b]}; Fair^{[b]}; Tal Herzberg^{[b]} | 4:15 |
| 7. | "You've Changed" | Cole; Fair; Leonard Huggins; Rich Shelton | Shelton; Kevin Veney; Loren Hill; Fair | 4:17 |
| 8. | "We Could Be" | Cole; Errol McCalla Jr. | E-Poppi; Fair | 3:11 |
| 9. | "Situations" (featuring Chink Santana) | Cole; Francesca Richards; Andre Parker | Santana; Fair^{[a]} | 4:46 |
| 10. | "Down and Dirty" | Cole; Curtis; Elliott | Curtis | 3:52 |
| 11. | "Superstar" (featuring Metro City) | Cole; G. Cole | Mix; Polow da Don; Fair | 3:48 |
| 12. | "Never" (featuring Eve) | Cole; Eve Jeffers; Luther Vandross | E-Poppi; Fair | 4:03 |

13. "Street Is A Motha" (Unreleased) Cole 3:46

International bonus tracks
| No. | Title | Writer(s) | Producer(s) | Length |
|---|---|---|---|---|
| 13. | "I Changed My Mind" (Remix) (featuring Shyne) | Cole; Legend; Moses Levi | West; Fair^{[b]}; Herzberg^{[b]} | 3:38 |
| 14. | "Love" (AOL live version) | | | 4:35 |

Notes

- ^{^[a]} signifies a vocal producer
- ^{^[b]} signifies an additional producer

Sample credits

- "You've Changed" samples "Song Cry" by Jay-Z.
- "Never" contains sampled portions from "Never Too Much", written and performed by Luther Vandross.
- "I Changed My Mind" samples Get Out of My Life, Woman by Solomon Burke, although the sample is taken from "The Chronic (Intro)" by Dr. Dre, where Burke's sample is already embedded.

== Personnel ==
Credits adapted from the album's liner notes

Instruments

- Keyshia Cole – lead vocals, background vocals, Synths also Synclavier and songwriting
- Cyrus DeShield, Kareem Carter, Reynaldo Gilmore, Jyshoun Mcneil (Metro City) – lead vocals, background vocals
- Charlie Bisharat – violin
- Jacqueline Brand – violin
- Roberto Cani – violin
- Nico Carmine Abondolo – bass guitar
- Mario de Leon – violin
- Brian Dembow – viola
- Joel Derouin – violin
- Bruce Dukov – violin
- Stephen Erdody – cello
- Steve Erody – cello
- Marlo Fisher – viola
- Matt Funes – viola
- Armen Garabedian – violin
- Berj Garabedian – violin
- Julie Gigante – violin
- Endre Granat – violin
- Alan Grunfield – violin
- Clayton Haslop – violin
- Dan Higgins – flute, horn
- Josephina Vergara – violin
- David F. Walther – viola
- Jerry Hey – horn
- Suzie Katayama – cello
- Songa Lee – violin
- Natalie Leggett – violin
- Gayle Levant – harp
- Phillipe Levy – violin
- David Low – cello
- Rene Mandel – violin
- Darrin McCann – viola
- Vicki Miskolczy – viola
- Robin Olson – violin
- Simon Oswell – viola
- Sid Page – violin
- Sara Parkins – violin
- Joel Peskin – horn
- Katia Popov – violin
- Steve Rodriguez – bass guitar
- Anatoly Rosinsky – violin
- Sarah Thornblade – violin
- Kenneth Yerks – violin
- Raj Ertui – clarinet
- Miri Ben-Ari – Israel violin

Production

- Executive producers: Keyshia Cole, Ron Fair
- Producers: Tal Herzberg, Loren Hill, Sean Garrett, Diesel, Daron Jones, Kerry "Krucial" Brothers, John Legend, Chink Santana, Rich Shelton, Kevin Veney, Kanye West
- Vocal producers: Keyshia Cole, Ron Fair, Sean Garrett, Alicia Keys
- Engineers: Shannon Braxton, Tal Herzberg, Jun Ishizeki, Anthony Kilhoffer, Ann Mincieli
- Assistant engineers: J.D. Andrew, Jun Ishizeki
- Mixing: Ron Fair, Dave Pensado
- Mixing assistance: Ariel Chobaz
- Design: Jason Clark, Michelle Thomas
- Photography: Chapman Baehler
- Co-songwriter: Tim "Timbaland" Mosley

== Charts ==
=== Weekly charts ===
Weekly chart performance for The Way It Is
| Chart (2005–06) | Peak position |
|---|---|
| UK Albums (Official Charts) | 184 |
| UK R&B Albums (Official Charts) | 17 |
| US Billboard 200 | 6 |
| US Top R&B/Hip-Hop Albums (Billboard) | 2 |

=== Year-end charts ===
2005 year-end chart performance for The Way It Is
| Chart (2005) | Position |
|---|---|
| US Billboard 200 | 139 |
| US Top R&B/Hip Hop Albums (Billboard) | 32 |

2006 year-end chart performance for The Way It Is
| Chart (2006) | Position |
|---|---|
| US Billboard 200 | 61 |
| US Top R&B/Hip-Hop Albums (Billboard) | 10 |

== Certifications ==
Certifications and pure sales figures for The Way It Is
| Region | Certification | Certified units/sales |
|---|---|---|
| New Zealand (RMNZ) | Gold | 7,500^{‡} |
| United States (RIAA) | Platinum | 1,600,000 |
^{‡} Sales+streaming figures based on certification alone.

== Release history ==
List of release dates, showing region, formats and label
| Region | Date | Format(s) | Label | Ref. |
|---|---|---|---|---|
| Italy | June 21, 2005 | CD; digital download | A&M | |
| Japan | June 21, 2005 | CD; digital download | A&M | |
| United Kingdom | June 21, 2005 | CD; digital download | A&M | |
| United States | June 21, 2005 | CD; digital download | A&M | |
