= Daddy (Beyoncé song) =

Promotional single by Beyoncé

from the album Dangerously in Love
- Released: June 3, 2003
- Recorded: 2003
- Studio: South Beach Studios (Miami, FL)
- Genre: R&B
- Length: 4:58
- Label: Columbia
- Songwriters: Beyoncé Knowles; Mark Batson
- Producers: Beyoncé Knowles; Mark Batson

"Daddy" is a song recorded by American singer Beyoncé for her debut studio album, Dangerously in Love (2003). It was written and produced by Beyoncé herself, alongside Mark Batson. The song was not originally intended to be featured on the final track listing of the album. Beyoncé was able to record the song at South Beach Studios, based in Miami, Florida, as the release date of her debut album had been postponed. "Daddy" was released to US iTunes Store as a digital promotional single on June 3, 2003, through Columbia Records.

Beyoncé explained that the song's development was motivated by the devotion and the loyalty her father/manager, Mathew Knowles has towards his family members. Many of the songs on the album examine aspects of relationships. However, "Daddy" was considered to be an element analyzing the kinship ties between a father and his offspring from a different and more powerful perspective. Music critics, who generally received the song with positive reception, commented that the song was a way for Beyoncé to pay tribute to her father.

== Background and development ==
"Daddy" was written by Beyoncé and Mark Batson. It is the final song on Dangerously in Love, and is a hidden track on some copies. Beyoncé initially was not going to include the song on the album, however after undergoing multiple push-backs, she was able to work on extra material for the album which included "Daddy". Over forty-three songs were recorded for Dangerously in Love, all of which were overseen by father Mathew, however Beyoncé secretly planted the song on the album as a hidden track which left Mathew speechless out of shock and appreciation. He later revealed during an interview with Billboard magazine in 2009: "My favorite songs is... 'Daddy'... It basically says 'Thank you for all you've given me and when I marry a man, it will be like my daddy'". Preceding the album's release, the song was released to iTunes Store exclusively in the United States on June 23, 2003, through Columbia Records. It is also featured on the soundtrack of Tyler Perry's Daddy's Little Girls (2007).

Concerning the conception of "Daddy", Beyoncé told MTV News:

"My mother and father have been together for 23, 24 years, and I've seen them go through a lot. And he has always supported his wife and supported his family and supported me and my sister and [my cousin] Angela Beyince. That loyalty and that strength that he has, those certain qualities I just want in all the people around me.

— Beyoncé Knowles (2003),

== Composition ==
"Daddy"
A 29-second sample of the song, featuring Beyoncé singing about the qualities of her father.

"Daddy" is a nearly five-minute long R&B song. The first verse of the song begins with Beyoncé reminiscing about the times she and her father/manager, Mathew Knowles shared as a child and through her adolescence. She sings about wanting to be with a man and a child who has similar qualities as her father. This is illustrated in the lyrics: "I treasure every irreplaceable memory and that's why I want my unborn son to be like my daddy, I want my husband to be like my daddy, there is no one else like my daddy." According to Marc Anthony Neal of the PopMatters, Beyoncé also confidently embraces her womanhood in the song. In a way, Beyoncé pays tribute to her father through this song.

== Critical reception ==
Mark Edward Nero of About.com stated that "Daddy" was probably written specifically for the soundtrack album of Daddy's Little Girls and that it may even "play a part in a pivotal scene." Making reference to Beyoncé long-time relationship with Jay-Z and then recent rumors about them possibly getting married, Nero added that the song might leave several numerous fans wondering what could happen next. Marc Anthony Neal of the international webzine PopMatters considered "Daddy" to be the "most affecting song on Dangerously in Love." He went on writing that the song is an extraordinary tribute to her father Mathew Knowles, stating that Beyoncé "embraces [...] the man that has helped take the kind of artistic leap that Dangerously in Love represents." He ended up by adding that "By the time listeners get to the fifteenth and final track, they will have been so pleasantly surprised and impressed by Beyoncé's performance throughout, that 'Daddy' seems less corny" but it is in this song that she finally accepts the state of being a woman, rather than a girl. Erika Ramirez of Billboard magazine described the song as an ode dedicated to the man that "instilled perseverance".

Anthony DeCurtis of Rolling Stone commented that the album, which starts with "[a] cauldron of energy" on "Crazy in Love" (2003), ends by contrast with "Daddy" which he described as a five-minute tribute to her manager-father, and considered to be "an anthology of vocal and lyrical cliches." MTV News wrote that "Daddy" is different from the other relationship songs on Dangerously in Love, and added that it has a powerful message. By contrast, Allison Stewart of The Washington Post and Kelefa Sanneh of The New York Times both called "Daddy" a "creepy bonus track". Similarly, Spence D., writing for IGN Music stated that "Daddy" is not really worth uncovering, as it follows suit in terms of being "a by-the-books contempo R&B rendition", and he commented that "there is something oddly eerie about an attractive woman such as Beyoncé crooning the words 'I want my husband to be like my Daddy.'" Mike Wass of the website Idolator called the song one of the "duds" on the album and added that it was a "best forgotten ode to the superstar's father complete with stomach-churning lyrics like 'I want my husband to be like my daddy'". In 2014, Louis Virtel of the website HitFix reviewed the song negatively, calling it the worst on Dangerously in Love and describing its lyrics as "seriously simplistic". "Daddy" peaked at number 26 on the Billboard Hot RingMasters charts in the United States in 2014.
