= Dangerously in Love =

Studio album by Beyoncé
- Released: June 20, 2003
- Recorded: 2000 (Note: "Dangerously in Love 2" was first recorded in 2000 for Destiny's Child's third studio album Survivor (2001). Its instrumentals were subsequently reworked and re-recorded in 2002 for Dangerously in Love.); March 2002–March 2003
- Studios: Baseline (Note: Tracks 4 and 10); Right Track (Note: Track 11); SoHo (Note: Track 9); Sony (Note: Tracks 1, 5 and 8); The Hit Factory (Note: Tracks 3, 5, 8 and 11) (New York City); COE.BE.3 (Note: Track 7) (Stone Mountain); PatchWerk (Note: Tracks 9 and 14); Stankonia (Note: Track 4) (Atlanta); South Beach (Note: Tracks 2, 3, 6, 7, 9 and 13) (Miami); SugarHill (Note: Track 12) (Houston); The Enterprise (Burbank)
- Genre: R&B
- Length: 60:52
- Labels: Music World; Columbia
- Producers: Nat Adderley, Jr.; Sherrod Barnes; Mark Batson; Craig Brockman; D-Roy; Missy Elliott; Focus...; Rich Harrison; Andreao "Fanatic" Heard; Beyoncé Knowles; Errol "Poppi" McCalla, Jr.; Mr. B; The Neptunes; Nisan Stewart; Scott Storch; Kanye West; Bryce Wilson

Beyoncé chronology
Dangerously in Love (2003)	True Star: A Private Performance (2004)

Singles from Dangerously in Love
- 1. "Crazy in Love" Released: May 18, 2003; 2. "Baby Boy" Released: August 3, 2003; 3. "Me, Myself and I" Released: October 19, 2003; 4. "Naughty Girl" Released: March 14, 2004; 5. "The Closer I Get to You" Released: June 13, 2004

Dangerously in Love is the debut solo studio album by the American singer and songwriter Beyoncé. It was released on June 20, 2003, by Columbia Records and Music World Entertainment. The album features guest appearances by Beyoncé's then-boyfriend Jay-Z, as well as Missy Elliott, Sean Paul, Big Boi of Outkast, Sleepy Brown, and Luther Vandross, with international editions including vocals from Vanness Wu and IAM. Musically, the album is a mixture of uptempo tracks and ballads, all of which are primarily R&B songs, while also incorporating elements of soul, hip-hop, and Arabic music.

During the recording of Destiny's Child's third studio album Survivor (2001), the group announced that each member would record solo albums. Recording sessions for Dangerously in Love took place from March 2002 to March 2003 at various recording studios during the group's hiatus. As the executive producer of the album, Beyoncé took a wider role in its production, co-writing a majority of the songs, choosing which ones to produce and sharing ideas on mixing and mastering. Although she remained discreet about her interpretation of the album's songs, their underlying meanings were attributed by media outlets as allusions to her intimate relationship with rapper Jay-Z.

Upon its release, Dangerously in Love received mixed reviews from music critics but was a commercial success, with the album debuting at number one on the US Billboard 200 with sales of 317,000 copies in its first week. At the 46th Annual Grammy Awards (2004), the album and its songs won five awards, including Best Contemporary R&B Album; Beyoncé consequently tied with Lauryn Hill, Alicia Keys and Norah Jones for the record of most Grammy Awards won by a woman at a single ceremony. (Note: Beyoncé would break her own record at the 52nd Annual Grammy Awards (2010), when she won six awards.) Dangerously in Love has been certified septuple platinum by the Recording Industry Association of America. It remains Beyoncé's bestseller and one of the best-selling albums of the 21st century, with sales of over 11 million copies worldwide.

Dangerously in Love produced four singles. "Crazy in Love" and "Baby Boy" spent eight and nine consecutive weeks, respectively, atop the US Billboard Hot 100. "Me, Myself and I" peaked at number four in the US but reached lower peaks than its predecessors internationally. "Naughty Girl" peaked at number three on the Billboard Hot 100 and inside the top ten in several other countries. The final single was a cover of Donny Hathaway and Roberta Flack's "The Closer I Get to You", sung by Beyoncé and Luther Vandross. Beyoncé promoted the album through numerous live performances and two concert tours—Dangerously in Love Tour (2003) and Verizon Ladies First Tour (2004), the latter co-headlined with Alicia Keys and Elliott, while the former yielded the live album Live at Wembley (2004).

== Background and development ==
Beyoncé launched her career as the lead singer in the R&B girl group Destiny's Child in the late 1990s. According to Corey Moss of MTV News, "fans [were] eager to see" how Beyoncé, after years with the group, would perform as a solo artist. While recording their third album Survivor in late 2000, Beyoncé announced the group would be put on hiatus in order for the members to record solo albums in the coming years, which they hoped would boost interest in Destiny's Child. The idea for individual releases came from the group's manager and Beyoncé's father Mathew Knowles. With different musical styles for each member to produce, the albums were not intended to compete on the charts. Destiny's Child's management strategically planned to stagger the release of each group member's album to maximize sales.

Michelle Williams was the first to release a debut solo album, titled Heart to Yours, in April 2002. Meanwhile, Beyoncé had her film debut in the comedy film Austin Powers in Goldmember, and recorded her debut single "Work It Out", which was featured on the film's soundtrack. Kelly Rowland collaborated with American rapper Nelly on the song "Dilemma" (2002) as a featured artist; it became a US Billboard Hot 100 number-one single, leading the label to advance the release date of her debut solo album Simply Deep to October. Beyoncé additionally starred in The Fighting Temptations (2003) and recorded another solo single. In August 2002, she collaborated with her now-husband Jay-Z as a featured vocalist on his song "'03 Bonnie & Clyde". Peaking at number four on the Billboard Hot 100, the song earned Beyoncé credibility as a solo artist and paved the way for the release of Dangerously in Love.

== Recording and production ==
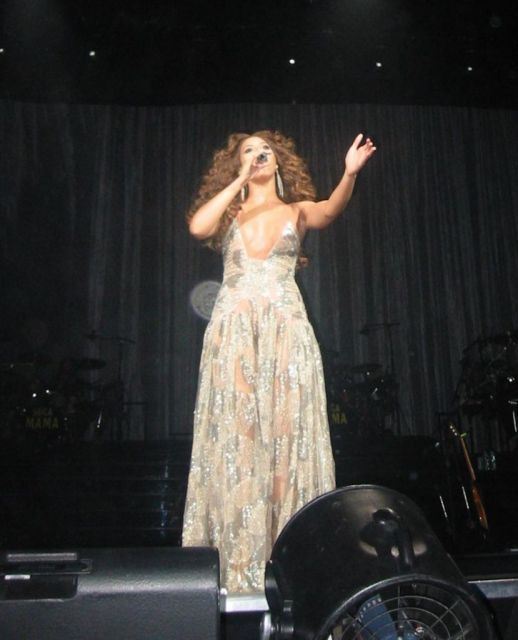
Beyoncé performing the title track "Dangerously in Love 2"—originally recorded by Destiny's Child—during The Beyoncé Experience tour in 2007

Before Beyoncé began recording for Dangerously in Love, she selected the producers with whom she would collaborate. For two days, she held meetings with prospective producers from the West Coast across the East Coast, and had interviews with them. Beyoncé went to Miami to begin sessions with producer Scott Storch, her first collaborator, and lived in a hotel for the following months. As she wanted to concentrate on the album, Beyoncé took her time to avoid pressure, a markedly different approach from the hasty productions of Destiny's Child's albums. Beyoncé felt that recording an album without her groupmates was "liberating and therapeutic", coming into the studio and express her ideas freely with her collaborators. The dependency she developed with Destiny's Child, however, meant it was harder "to be on [her] own creatively". As she wanted to grow as an artist, Beyoncé contacted other artists to form collaborative partnerships. When the collective finished writing several songs, she printed copies of each and sent them to prospective guest artists. She talked to them by phone for possible collaboration, eventually securing their approval. Besides Jay-Z, Beyoncé was able to work with Jamaican artist Sean Paul and American rapper Missy Elliott, among others. In contrast, some artists sent songs to Beyoncé that were eventually produced. Beyoncé also worked with Elliott and Timbaland on a track titled "Wrapped Around Me", but it ultimately did not appear on the album.

Survivor included a track titled "Dangerously in Love", which was considered too sophisticated compared with the album's other tracks, and Destiny's Child decided not to release it as a single. After recording several tracks for Dangerously in Love, Beyoncé decided to re-record and add the track, retitling it "Dangerously in Love 2", after realizing that it fit the album's overarching theme of her album. As she did on Survivor, Beyoncé took a wider role in the production of Dangerously in Love, co-writing a majority of the songs, choosing which ones to produce and sharing ideas on the mixing and mastering of tracks. Although Beyoncé did not create beats, she came up with melodies and ideas she shared with the producers. Since the album's release date was postponed so Columbia Records could capitalize on the success of Kelly Rowland's feature on Nelly's "Dilemma", Beyoncé was given the chance to further enhance the record. Although she was disappointed with the decision, Beyoncé realized that "everything happens for a reason", agreeing to return to the recording studio to work with other songwriters. This allowed her to record more songs, including the album's lead single "Crazy in Love". In late 2002, Beyoncé paused working on Dangerously in Love in favor of a holiday tour with Destiny's Child. With a few weeks left for recording in March 2003, Beyoncé was still collaborating with other guests on the album, including Sean Paul and P. Diddy. The latter contributed on "Summertime", which ultimately did not make the album's final cut. However, it was later sent to radio stations and received a favorable response. Consequently, Beyoncé planned to release a follow-up album made up of leftover tracks from Dangerously in Love, because the sessions had produced enough material for another album. (Note: Beyoncé ultimately scrapped the project in January 2004, in order to record Destiny's Child's fourth and final studio album Destiny Fulfilled, released in November. Following the disbandment of Destiny's Child, Beyoncé recorded an entirely new second studio album, titled B'Day (2006).) With 43 songs completed, Beyoncé is credited as a co-writer and a co-producer, as well as the album's executive producer alongside her father and then-manager Mathew Knowles.

== Music and lyrics ==
"Crazy in Love"
The album's lead single, a collaboration with rapper Jay-Z, contains hip hop influence and lyrics about the effect of love.

"Baby Boy"
The album's second single features Arabic influences.

Beyoncé's father and then-manager Mathew Knowles said Dangerously in Love showcased her musical roots. While Williams and Rowland explored gospel and alternative pop styles, respectively, Beyoncé focused on recording R&B songs. The album's tracks vary, ranging from mid-tempo and club-oriented tracks on the first half, to ballads on the second half. Beyoncé commented: "My album is a good balance of ... ballads and ... mid-tempos with just ridin'-in-your-car feels, to a lot of ... up-tempo club songs, to really sexy songs, to songs that make you feel emotional. It's a nice mixture of different types of tracks." Although it contains high-energy tracks such as "Crazy in Love" and "Naughty Girl", the album's focal mode is slow and moody. Beyoncé said she had mainly written ballads for the album. She added that she wanted to be understood as an artist and showcase her range, and by doing so, she blended various genres and musical influences; consequently, the album incorporates R&B, hip hop, soul, reggae and Arabic music influences. Its hip-hop influences came from Jay-Z, Outkast, and Lil' Kim, while the reggae influences came from Sean Paul. Additionally, Scott Storch's personal study of Arabic music gave the album a Middle Eastern vibe. Beyoncé and the producers also used a wide array of instrumentation.

Lyrically, love was the theme Beyoncé had incorporated for Dangerously in Love the most. Around the album's release, there were persistent rumors of her relationship with Jay-Z, which were later confirmed. Although "most of the material is vague enough to be about any relationship", the album contains multiple tracks that appeared to affirm their relationship. On "Signs", Beyoncé sings about being in love with a Sagittarius, Jay-Z's zodiac sign. Beyoncé said the album was lyrically similar to Destiny's Child's albums. However, since she had to write only for herself, Beyoncé had the chance to compose more personal songs than previous records with the group. With a theme based upon different stages of a romantic relationship, the album contains tracks about romance and honesty. In addition, Beyoncé admitted some addressed sex. The personal content of the album, however, was not generally attributed to Beyoncé's own experiences—although some songs were—instead, the theme kept recurring in her mind. Beyoncé later explained: "I wanted to have an album that everyone could relate to and would listen to as long as I'm alive and even after... Love is something that never goes out of style. It's something everybody experiences, and if they are not in love, people usually want to feel that..." While some songs merely focus on the "beauty of love", the album also explores another side of love, with songs that "celebrate breakup" and songs that narrate a woman's desire to have a degree of control in a relationship. The album's hidden track "Daddy" is a tribute to Mathew Knowles, describing Beyoncé's wish for her future husband and son to possess qualities similar to her father's. Originally, Beyoncé did not intend to include the track on the album, having thought its lyrics would make her appear immature. However, considering it one of the songs that reflected her life at that transitional moment, she placed "Daddy" as the closing track.

== Title and packaging ==
Dangerously in Love was titled after a track of the same name from Destiny's Child's third studio album Survivor (2001), which Beyoncé re-recorded for the album. The song itself is lyrically about being romantically obsessed, as indicated in the chorus: "I am in love with you / You set me free / I can't do this thing called life without you here with me". When "'03 Bonnie & Clyde" was released as a single in October 2002, critics and the public had speculated that Beyoncé and Jay-Z were being romantically involved. Despite widespread rumors, they remained silent about their relationship. According to critics, the album's title sounded "more intriguing" with Beyoncé singing personal songs. Although love was the theme Beyoncé had incorporated into the album, "most of the material is vague enough to be about any relationship"; some tracks, however, appeared to support the rumors. In response to the rumors allegedly echoed in the album's title, Beyoncé stated: "People can come to whatever conclusion they like... That's the beauty of music... I'm a singer, I'll talk about writing songs all you want. But when it comes to certain personal things any normal person wouldn't tell people they don't know, I just feel like I don't have to [talk about it]."

The album cover for Dangerously in Love was photographed by Markus Klinko. Beyoncé asked for a diamond-themed portrait, inspired by Klinko's 2000 campaign for Diamond.com showing French model Laetitia Casta lying on a diamond-studded spider web. Beyoncé's mother and stylist, Tina Knowles, brought a diamond-studded top for the shoot. Tina had brought skirts to pair with it, but Beyoncé felt they would look too "red carpet" with the top, according to Klinko. Instead, he lent Beyoncé his Dolce & Gabbana jeans for the shoot. The photograph was edited in post-production to conceal Beyoncé's breasts. Klinko said: "That famous pose she struck, with her arms out, she just did that. I didn't tell her to do that ... I just captured it." He felt the image "projected who Beyoncé was about to become ... Within a couple of years she had become that iconic, undeniable superstar. The photoshoot created a road map to where she was headed." The diamond top was displayed in the 2020 Rock and Roll Hall of Fame exhibition dedicated to Beyoncé.

== Release and promotion ==
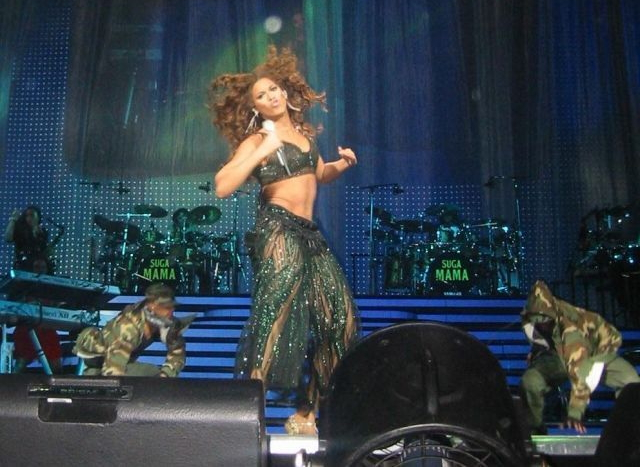
Beyoncé performing "Baby Boy" during The Beyoncé Experience tour in 2007

Beyoncé said she had trouble convincing Columbia Records executives to release Dangerously in Love. She recounted that it was almost not released: "In 2003, I had my first solo album. But when I played it through for my record label, they told me I didn't have one hit on my album. I guess they were kinda right, I had five—'Dangerously in Love', 'Naughty Girl', 'Me, Myself and I', 'Baby Boy' and 'Crazy in Love'." Since Kelly Rowland's "Dilemma" was concurrently charting atop the US Billboard Hot 100, Beyoncé's management released "Work It Out", one of the songs on the soundtrack to Austin Powers in Goldmember, instead of a single from Dangerously in Love to prevent it from possibly competing with "Dilemma". Dangerously in Love was consequently pushed back from its original October 2002 release date to December, and then to May 2003. Beyoncé recorded a cover version of 50 Cent's "In da Club", which circulated on mixtapes before the original release date. The song failed to become a "dancefloor favorite"; Mathew Knowles, however, confirmed that it was just a "buzz cut" and was not included on the album. Nonetheless, it earned enough airplay to reach the US Hot R&B/Hip-Hop Songs. While Beyoncé was completing the album, several of its tracks had leaked online. In an effort to prevent more tracks from being spread illegally or bootlegged, Columbia Records, with high commercial expectations from the album, pulled the release of Dangerously in Love to June 24, two weeks ahead of the planned July 8 release.

Buyers who pre-ordered Dangerously in Love via Sony Music's online store received links from which they could download a song titled "I Can't Take No More" (written by Beyoncé, Mario Winans and Mike Jones and produced by Winans); the offer lasted until the album's release. On June 14, Beyoncé premiered songs from the album during her first solo concert and the pay-per-view television special titled Ford Presents Beyoncé Knowles, Friends & Family, Live From Ford's 100th Anniversary Celebration in Dearborn, Michigan. On the night of the album's release, Beyoncé's concert was broadcast in over 20 theaters across the United States. Rowland, Michelle Williams, Tyrese and Beyoncé's younger sister Solange also performed during the show. Beyoncé also promoted the album by performing on television shows such as Saturday Night Live, Late Show with David Letterman, Today, The Early Show, and The View. She further promoted it with her Dangerously in Love Tour in November 2003, performing in the United Kingdom, Ireland and the Netherlands. Her concert at Wembley Arena in London on November 10, was filmed for her live album Live at Wembley, released on April 26, 2004. Additionally, Beyoncé co-headlined the Verizon Ladies First Tour with Alicia Keys and Missy Elliott across the US from March to April 2004.

== Singles ==
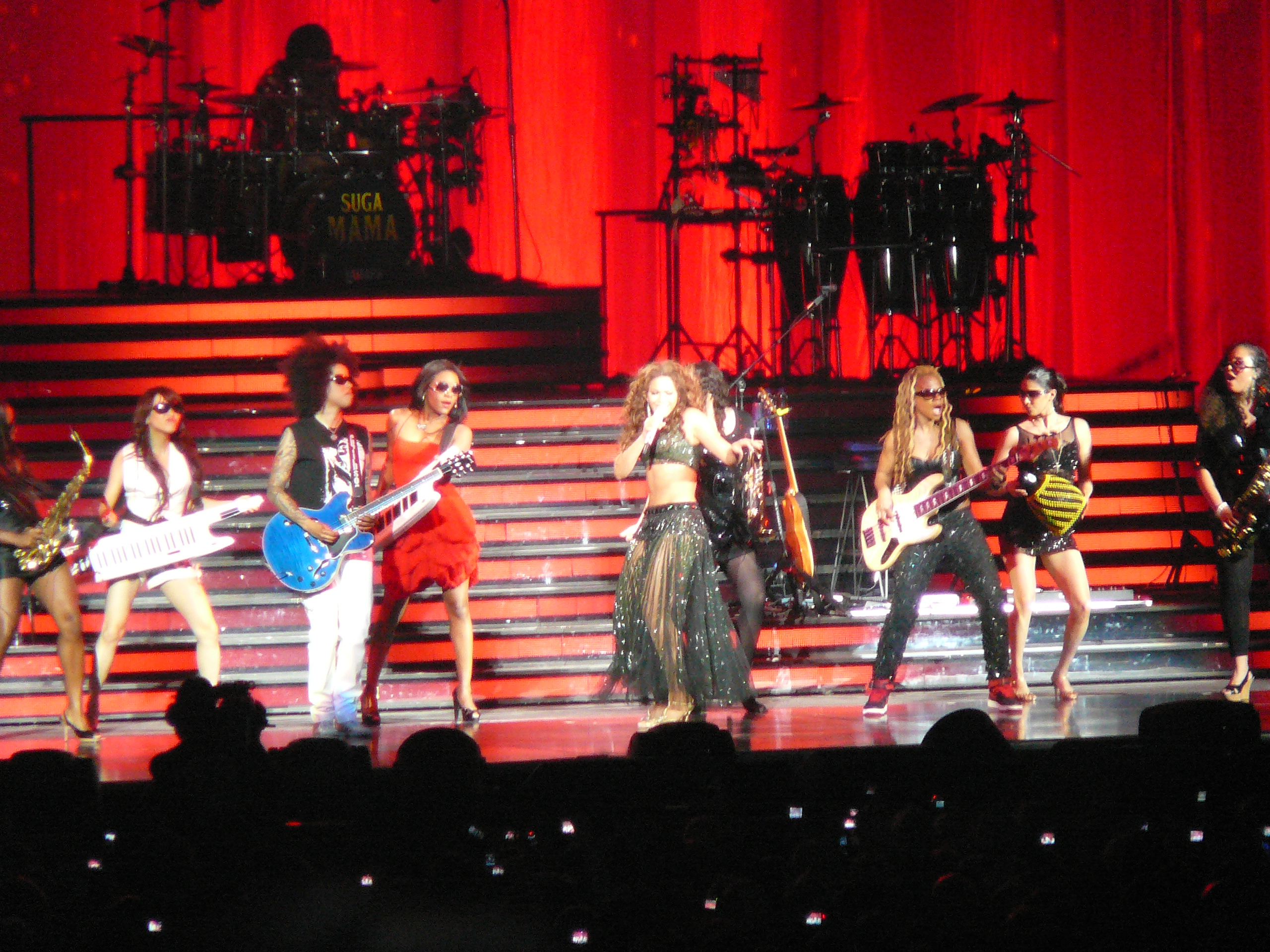
Beyoncé performing "Naughty Girl" during The Beyoncé Experience tour in 2007

In April 2003, Columbia Records was choosing the lead single from Dangerously in Love between two songs. The song that received the better club response would be selected as the lead single. Finally, "Crazy in Love" was released as the lead single on May 14, 2003. Critics lauded it as "deliriously catchy". The single topped the US Billboard Hot 100, based on heavy rotation alone. The same week the song reached number one, Dangerously in Love topped the Billboard 200 as well. The substantial airplay and later retail sales of "Crazy in Love" helped it dominate the chart, subsequently spending eight straight weeks atop the Billboard Hot 100, making it Beyoncé's first number-one single as a solo artist. According to Nielsen SoundScan, "Crazy in Love" was the most downloaded song in the United States for four consecutive weeks in July 2003. The digital single was certified sextuple platinum by the Recording Industry Association of America (RIAA). The song also became a success internationally, reaching the top of the charts in Croatia, Ireland and the United Kingdom. At the 46th Annual Grammy Awards (2004), the song won Best R&B Song and Best Rap/Sung Collaboration. Its Jake Nava-directed accompanying music video "celebrates the evolution of a woman. It is about a girl who is at the point of a relationship. She realizes that she is in love, she is doing stuff she would not normally do but she does not care. It does not matter she is just crazy in love." Critically acclaimed, the video won Best Female Video, Best R&B Video and Best Choreography in a Video at the 2003 MTV Video Music Awards.

"Baby Boy" was released as the second single from Dangerously in Love on August 3, 2003. Critics received it well and described it as a "high-profile collaboration" which "bridges the gap between the genres of R&B, and dancehall." It ultimately topped the US Billboard Hot 100 eight weeks after its debut, and remained there for nine consecutive weeks, surpassing the eight-week run atop the chart of "Crazy in Love". The digital single was certified platinum by the RIAA. Internationally, the song peaked at number two on the UK Singles Chart, reaching the top ten in 15 additional countries. Its accompanying music video, Beyoncé's second consecutive to be directed by Nava, features Beyoncé performing the song infused with heavy choreography at a flooded party and on a Miami beach, among other settings.

"Me, Myself and I" was released as the third single from Dangerously in Love on October 19, 2003. It received generally positive critical response, particularly for its production and Beyoncé's vocal performance. It peaked at number four on the US Billboard Hot 100, and reached the top ten in Canada. The digital single was certified platinum by the RIAA. However, the song failed to replicate its predecessors' international commercial success, reaching the top 20 in Australia, the Netherlands, New Zealand and the United Kingdom. Its Johan Renck-directed accompanying music video shows events of Beyoncé dealing with an unfaithful boyfriend in reverse. Critically acclaimed, the video was nominated for Best R&B Video at the 2004 MTV Video Music Awards.

"Naughty Girl" was released as the fourth and final single from Dangerously in Love on March 14, 2004. The song was lauded by critics, who noted that "Beyoncé borrowed a portion of Donna Summer's naughty classic "Love to Love You Baby" to create this celebration of sensual naughtiness." It peaked at number three on the US Billboard Hot 100, continuing Beyoncé's string of top-five singles on the chart. The digital single was certified platinum by the RIAA. Internationally, the song became a top-ten hit in Australia, Canada, the Netherlands, New Zealand and the United Kingdom. Despite "Me, Myself and I" and "Naughty Girl" not reaching number one on the Billboard Hot 100, they still achieved high commercial success and helped Dangerously in Love reach a multi-platinum status. The accompanying music video for "Naughty Girl" was directed by Nava and features Beyoncé seductively dancing and flirting with Usher. The Studio 54-styled video was inspired by the dancing of Cyd Charisse and Fred Astaire in the 1953 musical comedy film The Band Wagon. Critically acclaimed, it won Best Female Video at the 2004 MTV Video Music Awards.

Leading up to the release of Dangerously in Love, "Daddy" was released as a promotional single via iTunes Store on June 3, 2003. Beyoncé and Luther Vandross' cover of Roberta Flack and Donny Hathaway's "The Closer I Get to You" was released as the fourth and final single from Vandross' thirteenth and final studio album Dance with My Father on June 13, 2004. After winning Best R&B Performance by a Duo or Group with Vocals at the 46th Annual Grammy Awards, the song peaked at number 62 on the US Hot R&B/Hip-Hop Songs. Although it was never released as a single, "Dangerously in Love 2" won Best Female R&B Vocal Performance at the 46th Annual Grammy Awards, and peaked at number 57 on the US Billboard Hot 100. Its mastertone was certified gold by the RIAA.

== Critical reception ==
Professional ratings
Aggregate scores
Source	Rating
Metacritic	63/100
Review scores
Source	Rating
AllMusic	4/5 stars
Blender	4/5 stars
Entertainment Weekly	A−
The Guardian	2/5 stars
NME	5/10
Q	3/5 stars
Rolling Stone	3/5 stars
The Rolling Stone Album Guide	4/5 stars
USA Today	3.5/4 stars
Vibe	3/5

Dangerously in Love received generally mixed reviews from music critics. At Metacritic, which assigns a normalized rating out of 100 to reviews from mainstream critics, the album received an average score of 63, based on 17 reviews, indicating "generally favorable reviews". Anthony DeCurtis of Rolling Stone viewed that it presents Beyoncé in two styles, one "far more flattering" than the other, and found the ballad-oriented songs on the album least flattering, commenting that Beyoncé has "plenty of time" to develop the style maturely that would "[make] sense for her". Entertainment Weekly's Neil Drumming commented that the album validates Beyoncé's "taste in innovation". He also viewed that Beyoncé's collaboration with various record producers explores new directions in contemporary music, doing more reinventing than revisiting. Like DeCurtis' review, however, Drumming pointed out that "most of the disc's missteps" are in its latter part.

Slant Magazine's Sal Cinquemani wrote that "[Beyoncé] is allowed more room to experiment vocally as a solo artist, exploring softer registers and lathering on the coquettish persona that was only hinted at on Destiny's Child tracks like 'Bootylicious.'". Steve Jones of USA Today stated, "Beyoncé succeeds by showing greater depth as a songwriter and broader range as a singer". Blender's Ben Ratliff complimented Beyoncé's performance and stated, "She's playing the cool-hunter but covering the bases with seraphic arrangements of multiple voices. Her reach is remarkable". Mark Anthony Neal of PopMatters called it an "artistic leap" and wrote that it "finds Ms. B in the midst of a fully flowering womanhood and doing the best singing of her career". Uncut called its ballads "self-pitying/self-mythologising", while Q stated: "She has good songs, but no great songs". Los Angeles Times writer Natalie Nichols expressed that it "demonstrates vocal finesse [...] But, especially on the ballads, [Beyoncé] often drags things out with diva acrobatics".

In a mixed review, Vibe's Jason King said Dangerously in Love occasionally "sounds desperate to reach every demographic". Kelefa Sanneh, writing for The New York Times, felt that the album missed the harmonies of Destiny's Child records and that Beyoncé was more effective "when she's got a posse behind her". Rob Fitzpatrick of NME called it "a cruel glimpse of a talent that occasionally blazes but is frustratingly inconsistent". The Guardian's Adam Sweeting wrote that "the desperate urge to cover every musical base from dancefloor to soul-ballad means that there is barely a track here with any distinctive identity or even a tune". In his consumer guide for The Village Voice, Robert Christgau cited "Yes" and "Baby Boy" as the album's highlights and quipped that the artist was "Dangerously in Love ... with her daddy, the bonus cut reveals—as if we didn't know." He gave the album a one-star honorable mention, indicating "a worthy effort consumers attuned to its overriding aesthetic or individual vision may well like." In a retrospective review, AllMusic editor Stephen Thomas Erlewine commented that "the first half is good enough to make Dangerously in Love one of the best mainstream urban R&B records released in 2003, and makes a strong case that Beyoncé might be better off fulfilling this destiny instead of reuniting with Destiny".

== Accolades ==
Dangerously in Love and its singles earned Beyoncé numerous awards and nominations. Beyoncé was recognized as New Female Artist and New R&B Artist, among the four awards she won during the 2003 Billboard Music Awards. At the November 2003 American Music Awards, the album was nominated in the category for Favorite Soul/R&B Album. It also received a nomination in the category for Best Album at the 2003 MOBO Awards. At the 46th Annual Grammy Awards, Beyoncé won Best Contemporary R&B Album along with four other awards for the album's songs. With that feat, she tied with Alicia Keys, Norah Jones, and Lauryn Hill for most Grammy Awards won by a female artist in one night. At the 2004 Brit Awards, the album was nominated in the category for Best International Album but lost to Justin Timberlake's Justified. However, the singer herself won in the category for International Female Solo Artist. Dangerously in Love was also nominated in the category for Best Album at the 2004 MTV Europe Music Awards.

=== Rankings ===
Rankings
Year	Publication	List	Position	Ref.
2003	The Face	Recordings of the Year	12	
2003	The Village Voice	Pazz & Jop	58	
2007	Rock and Roll Hall of Fame	200 Definitive Albums That Shaped Rock and Roll	183	
2007	Vibe	The 150 Albums That Define the Vibe Era	98	
2008	Entertainment Weekly	Top 100 Best Albums of the Past 25 Years	19	
2009	MTV Base	Greatest Albums Ever	58	
2021	Consequence	10 Solo Albums That Every Music Fan Should Own	–	
2023	Paste	The 100 Greatest Debut Albums Since 2000	67	
2023	UPROXX	The Best Albums of 2003, Ranked (20 Years Later)	10	

== Commercial performance ==
In the United States, Dangerously in Love debuted atop the Billboard 200 chart dated July 12, 2003, with first-week sales of 317,000 copies according to Nielsen SoundScan. Although its first-week sales failed to match those of Survivor (2001), which sold 663,000 copies, Beyoncé registered the highest single-week sales among Destiny's Child members' solo albums: Kelly Rowland's Simply Deep sold 77,000 copies in its first week, while Michelle Williams' Heart to Yours sold 17,000 copies in its strongest week. Beyoncé became the first female artist and the fifth artist ever to simultaneously top both the singles chart—with "Crazy in Love—and albums charts in the United States and the United Kingdom, following the Beatles, Simon & Garfunkel, Rod Stewart and Men at Work. In its second week, the album registered a 42-percent sales decrease to 183,000 copies, descending to number two behind Ashanti's Chapter II. It remained behind Chapter II at number two in its third week, selling 132,000 copies. The album has been certified sextuple platinum by the Recording Industry Association of America (RIAA). It remains Beyoncé's best-selling album in the country to date, with cumulative sales of over five million copies as of December 2015. In Canada, the album debuted atop the Canadian Albums Chart and has since been certified triple platinum by Music Canada.

Across Europe, Dangerously in Love reached the summit in Germany, Greece, Iceland, Ireland and Norway, also peaking atop the European Top 100 Albums. In November 2003, it was certified platinum by the International Federation of the Phonographic Industry (IFPI) for sales of one million copies across Europe. By July 2011, the album had sold over 1,143,000 copies in the UK, being certified quadruple platinum by the British Phonographic Industry (BPI). In Australia, the album debuted at number three on the ARIA Top 100 Albums, ascending to its peak at number two the following week. It eventually went on to be certified triple platinum by the Australian Recording Industry Association (ARIA). In New Zealand, the album debuted at number 14, peaking at number eight in its second week. It was later certified double platinum by Recorded Music NZ (RMNZ). In Japan, the album peaked at number 12 on the Oricon Albums Chart, being certified gold by the Recording Industry Association of Japan (RIAJ). As of 2011, Dangerously in Love has sold over 11 million copies worldwide.

== Legacy ==
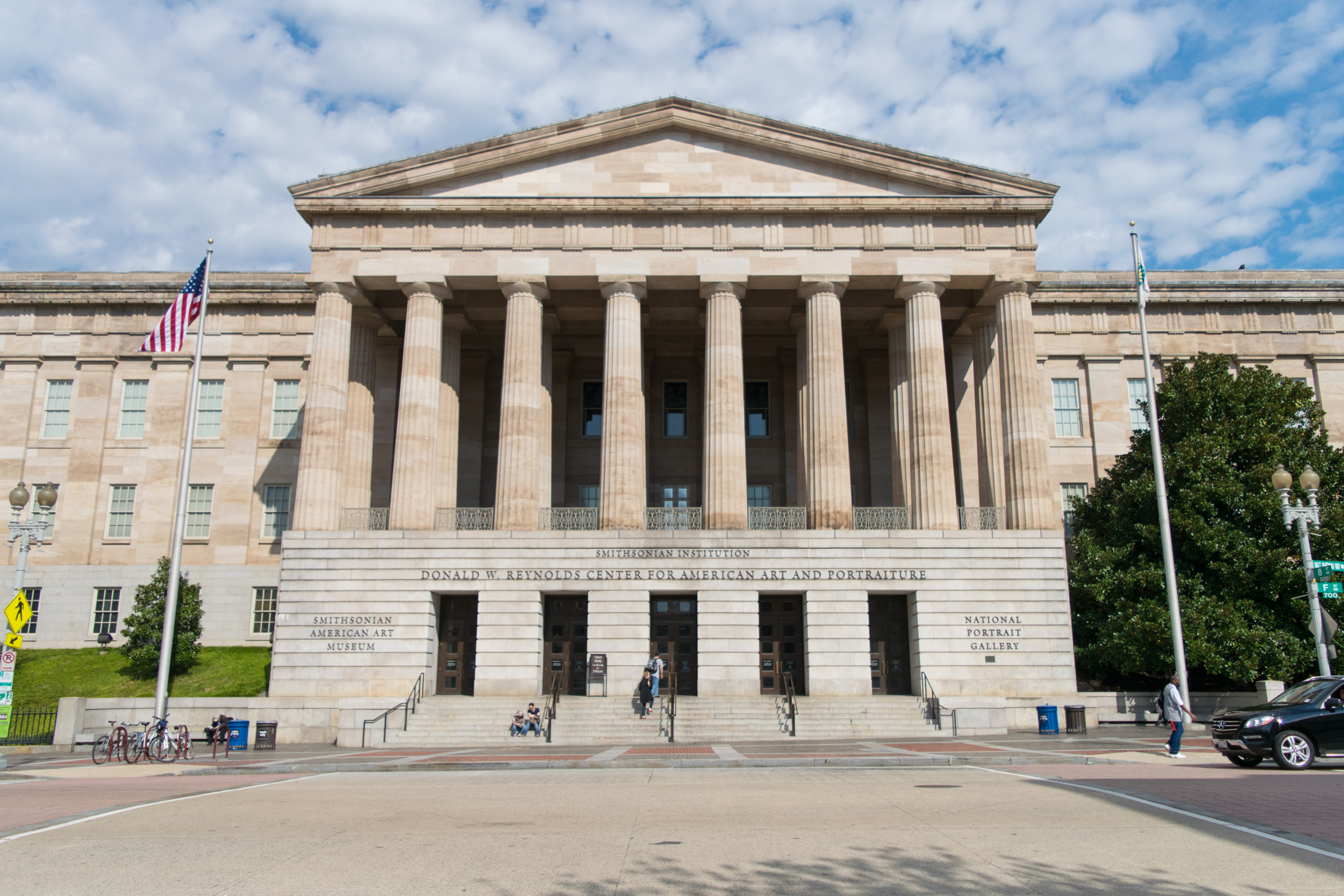
The album cover for Dangerously in Love was added to the National Portrait Gallery, with the writing "CD in Stores June 24".

With the release of Dangerously in Love and the combined commercial success of its singles, Beyoncé had established herself as a viable solo artist. Rebecca Louie of the New York Daily News wrote that the success of Dangerously in Love brought Beyoncé into a "sultry solo star" who "blossomed from a girly group", referring to Destiny's Child. The album also facilitated her to become one of the most marketable artists in the industry. She appeared on the cover of numerous magazines, guested television shows for promotions, and signed lucrative commercial deals. In 2003, she signed a contract with the conglomerate beverage manufacturer PepsiCo, and appeared on several television commercials for its products within the next ten years. The album's success also incited the public to infer that it signalled the disbandment of Destiny's Child, as singer Justin Timberlake "could not go back to 'N Sync after tasting solo success". However, Beyoncé said that their side projects were only "a brief diversion in the juggernaut that has become Destiny's Child".

As time did not permit, Beyoncé's solo aspirations–which included a follow-up album to Dangerously in Love composed of its unreleased tracks–were put on hiatus for her to concentrate on her Super Bowl XXXVIII performance. She was slated to sing the US national anthem "The Star-Spangled Banner" there, and was busy recording of Destiny's Child's fifth studio album Destiny Fulfilled (2004). Destiny Fulfilled would also become their final album, as the group ultimately disbanded in 2006. Following the disbandment, Beyoncé recorded her second solo studio album B'Day (2006). The album became her second to debut atop the US Billboard 200, with first-week sales of 541,000 units, which exceeded those of Dangerously in Love. Its "handsome debut" was noted by Keith Caulfield of Billboard as having been generated "by goodwill earned from the performance of [Beyoncé's] smash first album Dangerously in Love."

== Track listing ==
Dangerously in Love track listing
No.	Title	Writer(s)	Producer(s)	Length
1.	"Crazy in Love" (featuring Jay-Z)	Beyoncé Knowles; Rich Harrison; Shawn Carter; Eugene Record	Harrison; Knowles	3:56
2.	"Naughty Girl"	Knowles; Scott Storch; Robert Waller; Angela Beyincé; Pete Bellotte; Giorgio Moroder; Donna Summer	Storch; Knowles	3:28
3.	"Baby Boy" (featuring Sean Paul)	Knowles; Storch; Sean Paul Henriques; Waller; Carter	Storch; Knowles	4:04
4.	"Hip Hop Star" (featuring Big Boi and Sleepy Brown)	Knowles; Bryce Wilson; Makeda Davis; Antwan Patton; Carter	Knowles; Wilson; Big Boi^{[a]}	3:42
5.	"Be with You"	Knowles; Harrison; Beyince; Shuggie Otis; George Clinton Jr.; William Collins; Gary Cooper	Harrison; Knowles	4:20
6.	"Me, Myself and I"	Knowles; Storch; Waller	Storch; Knowles	5:01
7.	"Yes"	Knowles; Bernard Edwards Jr.; Carter	Knowles; Focus...	4:19
8.	"Signs" (featuring Missy Elliott)	Missy Elliott; Nisan Stewart; Craig Brockman	Elliott; Brockman^{[b]}; Stewart^{[b]}; Knowles^{[c]}	4:58
9.	"Speechless"	Knowles; Andreao Heard; Sherrod Barnes; Beyincé	Knowles; Heard; Barnes	6:00
10.	"That's How You Like It" (featuring Jay-Z)	Delroy Andrews; Brian Bridgeman; Knowles; Carter; Randy DeBarge; Eldra DeBarge; Etterlene Jordan	D-Roy; Mr. B; Knowles	3:39
11.	"The Closer I Get to You" (with Luther Vandross)	James Mtume; Reggie Lucas	Nat Adderley Jr.	4:57
12.	"Dangerously in Love 2"	Knowles; Errol "Poppi" McCalla Jr.	Knowles; McCalla	4:53
13.	"Beyoncé Interlude"	Knowles	Knowles	0:16
14.	"Gift from Virgo"	Knowles; Otis	Knowles	2:43
15.	"Daddy"	Knowles; Mark Batson	Knowles; Batson	4:58
Total length:				60:52

Sony Music digital pre-order bonus track
No.	Title	Writer(s)	Producer(s)	Length
16.	"I Can't Take No More"	Knowles; Mario Winans; Michael Jones	Winans	4:46
Total length:				65:38

=== Notes ===
- ^[a] signifies an additional vocal producer
- ^[b] signifies a co-producer
- ^[c] signifies a vocal producer
- International physical editions include the lead single "Work It Out" from the soundtrack album Austin Powers in Goldmember and the lead single "03 Bonnie & Clyde" from the studio album The Blueprint 2: The Gift & The Curse. Internationally the track "Daddy" was released as a hidden track and was excluded for the digital release.
- Japanese edition includes additionally the bonus track "What's It Gonna Be" (written by Knowles, LaShaun Owens, Karrim Mack, Corte Ellis, Larry Troutman, Roger Troutman and Kandice Love).
- Asian edition includes additionally a version of "Crazy in Love" featuring Vanness Wu.
- French and Belgian editions include additionally the track ""Bienvenue" from the studio album Revoir un printemps.

== Personnel ==
Credits are adapted from the liner notes of Dangerously in Love.

- Nat Adderley, Jr. – arrangement (track 11), electric piano (track 11), production (track 11), string arrangements (track 11)
- Tawatha Agee – backing vocals (track 11)
- Vincent Alexander – additional engineering (track 4)
- Sanford Allen – concertmastering
- Chuckie Amos – hair styling
- Skip Anderson – additional keyboards (track 11), arrangement (track 11), programming (track 11)
- Delroy "D-Roy" Andrews – production (track 10), songwriting (track 10)
- Ray Bardani – mixing (track 11), string engineering (track 11)
- Sherrod Barnes – production (track 9), songwriting (track 9)
- Mark Batson (Note: As Batson contributed only to the hidden track "Daddy", he did not receive any credits in the liner notes of Dangerously in Love.) – additional instrumentation (track 15), conducting (track 15), engineering (track 15), production (track 15), songwriting (track 15), string arrangements (track 15)
- Carlos "El Loco" Bedoya – engineering (tracks 2, 3, 6, 8, 9 and 13), vocal engineering (track 7)
- Pete Bellotte – songwriting (track 2)
- Angela Beyincé – songwriting (tracks 2, 5 and 9)
- Beyoncé – executive production, production (tracks 1–10 and 12–15), songwriting (tracks 1–7, 9, 10 and 12–15), vocal production (track 8), vocals (all tracks)
- Big Boi – additional vocal production (track 4), songwriting (track 4), vocals (track 4)
- Kevin Bird – prop styling
- Brian Bridgeman – songwriting (track 10)
- Craig Brockman – production (track 8), songwriting (track 8)
- John "Jab" Broussard – additional guitars (track 12)
- Al Brown – string contracting (track 11)
- Dan Bucchi – mixing assistance (track 9)
- Chris Carmouche – additional engineering (track 4)
- Jim Caruana – engineering (tracks 1, 5 and 8)
- Demacio "Demo" Castellon – mixing assistance (track 8)
- George Clinton, Jr. – songwriting (track 5)
- William Collins – songwriting (track 5)
- Gary Cooper – songwriting (track 5)
- Tom Coyne – mastering (all tracks)
- Ian Cuttler – art direction
- Dahlen – photography
- Jason Dale – mixing assistance (track 7)
- Makeda Davis – songwriting (track 4)
- Eldra DeBarge – songwriting (track 10)
- Randy DeBarge – songwriting (track 10)
- Missy Elliott – production (track 8), songwriting (track 8), vocals (track 8)
- Focus... – engineering (track 7), instrumentation (track 7), production (track 7), songwriting (track 7)
- Guru – engineering (tracks 4 and 10)
- Phil Hamilton – guitar (track 11)
- Ivan Hampden Jr. – drums (track 11)
- Rich Harrison – instrumentation (tracks 1 and 5), production (tracks 1 and 5), songwriting (tracks 1 and 5)
- Andreao "Fanatic" Heard – production (track 9), songwriting (track 9)
- Cissy Houston – backing vocals (track 11)
- James Hunter – graphic design
- Indrani – photography
- Jay-Z – songwriting (tracks 1, 3, 4, 7 and 10), vocals (tracks 1 and 10)
- Bashiri Johnson – percussion (track 11)
- Etterlene Jordan – songwriting (track 10)
- Scott Kieklak – mixing (track 8)
- Quincy Jackson - marketing
- Markus Klinko – photography
- Mathew Knowles – executive production
- Tina Knowles – styling
- Brendan Kuntz – mixing assistance (track 14)
- Reggie Lucas – songwriting (track 11)
- Tony Maserati – mixing (tracks 1–7, 9, 10, 14 and 15)
- Errol "Poppi" McCalla, Jr. – production (track 12), songwriting (track 12)
- Byron Miller – bass (track 11)
- Giorgio Moroder – songwriting (track 2)
- Mr. B – production (track 10)
- James Mtume – songwriting (track 11)
- Shuggie Otis – songwriting (tracks 5 and 14)
- Sean Paul – songwriting (track 3), vocals (track 3)
- Greg Price – mixing assistance (tracks 2, 3 and 6)
- Eugene Record – songwriting (track 1)
- Mally Roncal – make-up
- Dexter Simmons – mixing (track 12)
- Sleepy Brown – vocals (track 4)
- Matt Snedecor – mixing assistance (tracks 9 and 14)
- Brian Springer – engineering (track 12)
- Nisan Stewart – production (track 8), songwriting (track 8)
- Scott Storch – production (tracks 2, 3 and 6), songwriting (tracks 2, 3 and 6)
- Donna Summer – songwriting (track 2)
- Candace Thomas – backing vocals (track 11)
- Pat Thrall – engineering (tracks 1 and 3)
- Luther Vandross – vocal arrangement (track 11), vocals (track 11)
- Luz Vasquez – mixing assistance (tracks 1–6 and 10)
- Stan Wallace – engineering (track 11)
- Robert Waller – songwriting (tracks 2, 3 and 6)
- Brenda White-King – backing vocals (track 11)
- Teresa LaBarbera Whites – A&R
- Bryce Wilson – production (track 4), songwriting (track 4)
- Pat Woodward – mixing assistance (tracks 1, 4–6 and 10)
- Dan Workman – engineering (track 12), guitars (track 12)

== Charts ==
=== Weekly charts ===
2003–2005 weekly chart performance
Chart	Peak position
Australian Albums (ARIA)	2
Australian Urban Albums (ARIA)	1
Austrian Albums (Ö3 Austria)	3
Belgian Albums (Ultratop Flanders)	3
Belgian Albums (Ultratop Wallonia)	13
Canadian Albums (Billboard)	1
Canadian R&B Albums (Nielsen SoundScan)	6
Danish Albums (Hitlisten)	5
Dutch Albums (Album Top 100)	4
European Top 100 Albums (Billboard)	1
Finnish Albums (Suomen virallinen lista)	6
French Albums (SNEP)	14
German Albums (Offizielle Top 100)	1
Greek Albums (IFPI)	1
Hungarian Albums (MAHASZ)	18
Icelandic Albums (Tónlist)	1
Irish Albums (IRMA)	1
Italian Albums (FIMI)	16
Japanese Albums (Oricon)	12
New Zealand Albums (RMNZ)	8
Norwegian Albums (VG-lista)	1
Polish Albums (ZPAV)	18
Portuguese Albums (AFP)	16
Scottish Albums (Official Charts)	1
South Korean Albums (RIAK)	3
Spanish Albums (AFYVE)	10
Swedish Albums (Sverigetopplistan)	11
Swiss Albums (Schweizer Hitparade)	2
UK Albums (Official Charts)	1
UK R&B Albums (Official Charts)	1
US Billboard 200	1
US Top R&B/Hip-Hop Albums (Billboard)	1

=== Monthly charts ===
2003–2004 monthly chart performance
Chart	Peak position
Russian Albums (NFPF)	9
South Korean International Albums (RIAK)	7

=== Year-end charts ===
2003 year-end chart performance
Chart (2003)	Position
Australian Albums (ARIA)	51
Australian Urban Albums (ARIA)	7
Belgian Albums (Ultratop Flanders)	39
Danish Albums (Hitlisten)	74
Dutch Albums (Album Top 100)	31
Finnish International Albums (Suomen virallinen lista)	38
French Albums (SNEP)	73
German Albums (Offizielle Top 100)	37
Hungarian Albums (MAHASZ)	85
Irish Albums (IRMA)	10
New Zealand Albums (RMNZ)	36
South Korean International Albums (RIAK)	18
Swedish Albums (Sverigetopplistan)	66
Swiss Albums (Schweizer Hitparade)	13
UK Albums (Official Charts)	14
US Billboard 200	19
US Top R&B/Hip-Hop Albums (Billboard)	12
Worldwide Albums (IFPI)	5

2004 year-end chart performance
Chart (2004)	Position
Australian Albums (ARIA)	74
Australian Urban Albums (ARIA)	9
Belgian Albums (Ultratop Flanders)	78
Dutch Albums (Album Top 100)	79
French Albums (SNEP)	128
UK Albums (Official Charts)	96
US Billboard 200	29
US Top R&B/Hip-Hop Albums (Billboard)	12

2005 year-end chart performance
Chart (2005)	Position
US Billboard 200	195
US Top R&B/Hip-Hop Albums (Billboard)	98

=== Decade-end charts ===
2000s decade-end chart performance
Chart	Position
US Billboard 200	59
US Top R&B/Hip-Hop Albums (Billboard)	67

=== Centurial charts ===
21st century chart performance
Chart	Position
UK Female Albums (Official Charts)	41
US Billboard 200	185

=== All-time charts ===
All-time chart performance
Chart	Position
Irish Female Albums (IRMA)	40
US Billboard 200 (Women)	95

== Certifications ==
Certifications and sales
Region	Certification	Certified units/sales
Argentina (CAPIF)	Gold	20,000^{^}
Australia (ARIA)	3× Platinum	210,000^{^}
Austria (IFPI Austria)	Gold	15,000^{*}
Belgium (BRMA)	Gold	25,000^{*}
Brazil (Pro-Música Brasil)	Gold	50,000^{‡}
Canada (Music Canada)	3× Platinum	300,000^{‡}
Denmark (IFPI Danmark)	2× Platinum	40,000^{‡}
France (SNEP)	2× Gold	200,000^{*}
Germany (BVMI)	3× Gold	300,000^{‡}
Greece (IFPI Greece)	Gold	10,000^{^}
Italy (FIMI) sales since 2009	Gold	25,000^{‡}
Indonesia	—	100,000
Japan (RIAJ)	Gold	100,000^{^}
Netherlands (NVPI)	Gold	40,000^{^}
New Zealand (RMNZ)	Platinum	15,000^{^}
New Zealand (RMNZ) digital	2× Platinum	30,000^{‡}
Norway (IFPI Norway)	Gold	20,000^{*}
Portugal (AFP)	Silver	10,000^{^}
Russia (NFPF)	Platinum	20,000^{*}
South Korea	—	37,464
Spain (Promusicae)	Gold	50,000^{^}
Sweden (GLF)	Gold	30,000^{^}
Switzerland (IFPI Switzerland)	Platinum	40,000^{^}
United Kingdom (BPI)	4× Platinum	1,260,000
United States (RIAA)	7× Platinum	7,000,000^{‡}
Summaries
Europe (IFPI)	Platinum	1,000,000^{*}
Worldwide	—	11,000,000
^{*} Sales figures based on certification alone.^{^} Shipments figures based on certification alone.^{‡} Sales+streaming figures based on certification alone.

== See also ==
- Beyoncé discography
- List of Billboard 200 number-one albums of 2003
- List of Billboard number-one R&B albums of 2003
- List of number-one albums of 2003 (Canada)
- List of number-one hits of 2003 (Germany)
- List of number-one albums of 2003 (Ireland)
- List of UK Albums Chart number ones of the 2000s
- List of UK R&B Albums Chart number ones of 2003
- List of best-selling albums of the 21st century
- List of best-selling albums by women
- Grammy Award for Best Contemporary R&B Album
