= I Should Have Cheated =

Single by Keyshia Cole

from the album The Way It Is
- Released: August 3, 2005
- Length: 5:31
- Label: A&M
- Songwriters: Daron Jones; Quinnes "Q" Parker
- Producers: Daron Jones; Ron Fair

Keyshia Cole singles chronology
"(I Just Want It) To Be Over" (2005)	"I Should Have Cheated" (2005)	"Love" (2006)

"I Should Have Cheated" is a song by American recording artist Keyshia Cole. It was written by 112 members Daron Jones and Quinnes "Q" Parker and recorded by Cole for her debut album, The Way It Is (2005), while production was helmed by Jones along with Ron Fair. The song was released on August 3, 2005 as the album's third single, following "I Changed My Mind" and "(I Just Want It) To Be Over." It rose to number four on US Billboard's Hot R&B/Hip-Hop Songs chart and number 30 on the US Billboard Hot 100. Its music video made it to the top five on 106 and Park and remained there for 46 days.

== Background ==
"I Should Have Cheated" was written by Daron Jones and Quinnes Parker, members of the R&B group 112. The song is about a girl who suspects her boyfriend of cheating, but he also accuses her of the same; since she was not cheating, she thinks that she should have cheated on him. Originally recorded by and for R&B singer Nivea for her 2005 second album, Complicated, it was eventually handed over to Cole. When asked about how the song ended on her album, Cole elaborated in an interview with MTV News that "Daron did a song with Kelly Price that I was a big fan of [...] So I saw him at a video shoot one day and asked if I could work with him. I don't think it was really in my budget, but he got paid eventually, and it all worked out, which is great because a lot of people like that don't work with new artists. So it was a blessing to actually work with him."

== Chart performance ==
"I Should Have Cheated" was released by A&M Records as the album's third single on August 3, 2005, following "I Changed My Mind" and "(I Just Want It) To Be Over." The song entered the US Billboard Hot 100 at number 85 and slowly moved up the charts, eventually peaking at number 30. "I Should Have Cheated" also was a success in the urban community, peaking at number 4 in the Hot R&B/Hip-Hop Songs chart, and charted on the Hot Dance Club Play chart at number 11. In the United Kingdom, the song peaked at number 48 on the UK Singles Chart, but became another top ten hit for Cole on the UK R&B Singles chart.

== Live performances ==
On October 26, 2005, Cole was announced as a performer at the second annual 2005 Vibe Awards. In November, Cole performed "I Should Have Cheated" at the 2005 Vibe Awards, which was where she was nominated for three awards and went home with only one (the Next Award alongside rapper Young Jeezy) and it marked her first ever career award and nominations. Cole's performance of the song became a fan-favorite and was praised by critics, being described as "show-stopping" and "ghetto-fabulous" and also gained head nods from famous audience members, most particularly Cole's idol Mary J. Blige.

== Music video ==
Cole reunited with Benny Boom, director of her previous music video for "(I Just Want It) To Be Over," to film a visual for "I Should Have Cheated." Rapper Chink Santana is featured as Cole's boyfriend in the video. Rapper and friends Free as well as writer Daron Jones and Quinnes Parker also make appearances. In the clip, Cole finds bits of evidence that show her what her man is up to, because of various cell phone messages and movie stubs. As it unfolds, the video periodically cuts to Cole in a recording studio with 112's Daron and Q. When she confronts her boyfriend, he claims that she is the one who is cheating. Since she was faithful in the relationship, Keyshia deems that she should have cheated.

== Track listings ==
Digital single
No.	Title	Writer(s)	Producer(s)	Length
1.	"I Should Have Cheated"	Daron Jones; Quinnes "Q" Parker	Jones; Ron Fair	3:59
2.	"I Changed My Mind" (radio edit)	Keyshia Cole; Kanye West; John Legend	West; Fair^{[a]}; Tal Herzberg^{[a]}	3:19
3.	"I Should Have Cheated" (The Double Time edit)	Jones; Parker	Jones; Fair	4:28
4.	"I Should Have Cheated" (Accapella)	Jones; Parker	Jones; Fair	6:31

Notes

- ^{^[a]} signifies an additional producer

== Credits and personnel ==
Credits adapted from the liner notes of The Way It Is.

- Charlie Bisharat – violin
- Keyshia Cole – arranger, vocals
- Ron Fair – instruments, mixing engineer, producer
- Tal Herzberg – nass, protools, engineer
- Daron Jones – producer, writer
- Quinnes "Q" Parker – writer

== Charts ==
=== Weekly charts ===
Chart performance for "I Should Have Cheated"
Chart (2005–2006)	Peak position
Ireland (IRMA)	43
Scotland Singles (OCC)	65
UK Singles (OCC)	48
UK Hip Hop/R&B (OCC)	9
US Billboard Hot 100	30
US Dance Club Songs (Billboard)	11
US Hot R&B/Hip-Hop Songs (Billboard)	4
US Rhythmic Airplay (Billboard)	33

=== Year-end charts ===
2005 year-end performance for "I Should Have Cheated"
Chart (2005)	Position
US Hot R&B/Hip-Hop Songs (Billboard)	71

2006 year-end performance for "I Should Have Cheated"
Chart (2006)	Position
US Hot R&B/Hip-Hop Songs (Billboard)	44
