= Ron Fair =

American music executive (born 1955)

- Born: Ronald Fair; 1955 (age 70–71); Los Angeles, California, U.S.
- Genres: Rock; pop; R&B
- Occupations: Record producer; music executive; A&R; music arranger; conductor; audio engineer
- Years active: 1970–present
- Labels: Virgin; Capitol; Geffen; A&M; Interscope; RCA
- Spouse: Stefanie Ridel (m. 2001)

Ronald Fair (born 1955) is an American record producer, record executive, musical arranger, recording engineer and conductor. A traditional record producer since 1970, Fair has been credited with orchestral production work on several commercially successful pop and R&B songs.

Fair has discovered and mentored recording artists including Christina Aguilera, Vanessa Carlton, Keyshia Cole, Black Eyed Peas, Fergie, and the Pussycat Dolls. He has also held executive positions including manager of A&R at RCA Records, chairman of Geffen Records, president of A&M Records, and chief creative officer (CCO) of Virgin Records.

== Career ==
=== Early career ===
Fair was born in Los Angeles, to a Jewish family. Fair's childhood played an important role in his eventual career direction, saying in an interview with HitQuarters, "My grandfather was a broadcaster who had built a remote facility for the purpose of producing a daily radio broadcast. Ever since I was two years old I was around microphones and consoles." During his childhood Fair was actively encouraged to pursue this career path, receiving various music tuition and being encouraged to take on the job training in multi-track recording. By the time he was 17 years old he was, in his words, "Very skilled with microphone technique and able to make a pretty convincing sounding recording." Fair's first job in the music industry was a short stint in the mailroom of Far Out Productions, in September 1979. Far Out Productions was the production company headed by Jerry Goldstein and Steve Gold, and produced albums by, most notably, War and Tanya Tucker.

Fair taught recording production at the University of Sound Arts in Hollywood while at the same time developing a reputation as a motion picture musical soundtrack coordinator, with the multi-platinum successes of Pretty Woman and Reality Bites. In addition, during the early 1980s Fair worked as a recording engineer on such projects as the Slayer album Hell Awaits.

=== A&R career ===
During his career, Fair has produced various hit singles on the pop and R&B charts, including "Lady Marmalade" (Christina, Pink, Mýa, Lil' Kim), "Be Without You" (Mary J. Blige), "One" (Mary J. Blige & U2), "Big Yellow Taxi" (Counting Crows), "A Thousand Miles" (Vanessa Carlton), and "Where Is the Love?" (Black Eyed Peas). He was also the executive producer of "Beautiful" (Christina Aguilera), "Big Girls Don't Cry" (Fergie), "Let's Get It Started" (Black Eyed Peas), among others. He is credited with executive production on recordings that have won several Grammy Awards, including those of Christina Aguilera, The Black Eyed Peas, Mary J. Blige and Queen Latifah.

In 2009, Fair engineered Lady Gaga's single "Speechless," from her album The Fame Monster. That same year, he also collaborated with Indian film composer A.R. Rahman to produce an English version of "Jai Ho", the hit song from the 2009 film Slumdog Millionaire.

Fair held the position of chairman at Geffen Records until joining Virgin Records. Prior to running Geffen Records, Fair was President of A&M Records for five years, and held senior A&R positions at RCA Records, Chrysalis Records, EMI Records, and Island Records-London.

In 2013, Fair was named the chief creative officer and Executive Vice President of Virgin Records. At this position, he was in charge of a major corporate restructure. After a year with the label, he left in October 2014.

Fair was a celebrity judge on the Canadian television talent program Cover Me Canada.

In 2015, Fair served as executive producer for TLC's self-titled fifth and final studio album.

== Personal life ==
Ron Fair married singer-songwriter Stefanie Ridel, a member of the girl group Wild Orchid, on September 4, 2001. They have four children together. Fair enjoys gardening and has climbed Mount Kilimanjaro.

== Discography ==
Notable productions

- 1990: Pretty Woman Soundtrack (Executive producer)
- 1992: White Men Can't Jump Soundtrack (Executive producer)
- 1994: Reality Bites Soundtrack (Executive producer)
- 1994: Dumb & Dumber Soundtrack (Executive producer)
- 2001: Legally Blonde Soundtrack (Executive producer)
- 2002: Christina Aguilera - "Beautiful" (Executive producer)
- 2002: Vanessa Carlton - "A Thousand Miles"
- 2003: The Black Eyed Peas - "Where Is The Love?"
- 2004: Vickie Natale - Like No Other (Executive producer)
- 2004: The Black Eyed Peas - "Let's Get It Started" (Executive producer)
- 2005: Keyshia Cole - The Way It Is (Executive producer)
- 2005: Pussycat Dolls - PCD (Executive producer)
- 2006: Fergie - "Big Girls Don't Cry"
- 2006: Gwen Stefani - The Sweet Escape (Executive producer)
- 2007: Keyshia Cole - Just Like You (Executive producer)
- 2008: Keyshia Cole - A Different Me (Executive producer)
- 2009: Lady Gaga - "Speechless"
- 2009: Pussycat Dolls - "Jai Ho! (You Are My Destiny)"
- 2010: Keyshia Cole - Calling All Hearts (Executive producer)

== Filmography ==
Film and television

Year	Film	Role	Notes
2004	Star Search: The Next Generation	Himself	TV series
2005	UK Music Hall of Fame: Biggest Selling Artists of the 21st Century	Himself	TV documentary
2007	Pussycat Dolls Present: The Search for the Next Doll	Judge	TV series
2007	The Pussycat Dolls: Live from Manchester Evening News Arena	Executive Producer	Video
2008	Pussycat Dolls Present: Girlicious	Judge and Executive Producer(6 episodes)	TV series
2008	E! True Hollywood Story	Himself	TV series documentary Ep: Pussycat Dolls
2008	Fox Reality Really Awards	Himself	TV series documentary
2010	American Idol	Himself	TV series - Episode: "Idol Gives Back/Top Seven Results"
2011	Inside: El DeBarge	Executive Producer	TV movie
2011	Living in La La Land	Judge	TV series
2011	Cover Me Canada	Judge	TV series
