= Keyshia Cole: All In =

2015 American reality television series

- Starring: Keyshia Cole; Manny Halley; Elite Noel; Neffeteria Pugh; Frankie Lons; Daniel Gibson; Daniel Gibson, Jr.
- Opening theme: "All In" by Keyshia Cole
- Country of origin: United States
- No. of seasons: 1
- No. of episodes: 8

Production
- Executive producers: James DuBose; Keyshia Cole; Manny Halley
- Running time: 30 minutes
- Production companies: DuBose Entertainment; Keyshia Cole Productions; BET Productions

Original release
- Network: BET
- Release: February 24 – April 21, 2015

Related
- Keyshia Cole: The Way It Is; Keyshia & Daniel: Family First; Frankie & Neffe; Keyshia Cole: My New Life

Keyshia Cole: All In is an American reality television series starring singer Keyshia Cole. The series premiered on February 24, 2015, on BET and concluded on April 21, 2015. It follows Cole as she balances her music career and motherhood while dealing with marital difficulties and strained relationships with members of her family. The program was her third reality television series for BET, following Keyshia Cole: The Way It Is and Keyshia & Daniel: Family First.

== Production ==
BET aired a preview of the series on January 27, 2015, approximately four weeks before its official premiere. The series began airing on February 24 at 10 p.m. EST/PT. Produced by DuBose Entertainment, the program was Cole's third reality television series centered on her personal life. It followed her as she continued her career after the release of her sixth studio album, Point of No Return (2014), and the conclusion of her longtime recording relationship with Interscope Records.

On April 20, 2015, BET announced a marathon of the season's previous episodes ahead of the finale, which was scheduled to air the following evening at 10 p.m. EST/PT.

== Overview ==
The series follows Cole as she embarks on her Point of No Return Tour while balancing her professional responsibilities with motherhood and her personal life. It documents difficulties in her marriage to former professional basketball player Daniel Gibson, including their efforts to navigate their changing relationship and co-parent their son, Daniel Jr. The program also explores Cole's strained relationships with her mother, Frankie Lons, and sister, Neffeteria Pugh (known as Neffe). As disagreements and past grievances continue to affect the family, Cole attempts to reconcile with her relatives and improve their relationships. The series additionally features her work surrounding the release of Point of No Return and the challenges of maintaining her music career amid her personal circumstances.

== Episodes ==
No.	Title	Original release date	U.S. viewers (millions)
1	"On the Road Again"	February 24, 2015	1.2
While on a lengthy concert tour, Keyshia struggles to balance her professional commitments with raising her son and dealing with her deteriorating marriage. Feeling isolated, she longs for support from her family but is reluctant to invite the drama associated with her mother and sister.
2	"Bad Blood"	March 3, 2015	0.97
During a concert in Atlanta, Keyshia reunites with her mother, Frankie, but avoids interacting with Neffe. Meanwhile, Frankie and Elite have a heated confrontation, prompting Frankie and Keyshia to make a promise to one another.
3	"Four Handfuls"	March 10, 2015	0.78
Keyshia and Neffe struggle to find common ground and repair their relationship. Frankie and Elite also attempt to reconcile their differences, while Keyshia tries to encourage healing within the family.
4	"Too Little, Too Late?"	March 17, 2015	—
Before leaving Atlanta, Keyshia and Neffe make one final attempt to salvage their strained relationship, questioning whether they can put their past disagreements behind them.
5	"Sons and Daughters"	March 25, 2015	0.70
As Marquisha prepares for motherhood, Frankie and Yvonne discuss becoming grandmothers. Keyshia also works to honor her promise to ensure that her son's father remains involved in his life.
6	"Party's Over"	March 31, 2015	—
After months of preparation, Manny organizes a party to celebrate the release of Keyshia's new album. The festivities are overshadowed when Keyshia must deal with the consequences of her arrest on assault charges.
7	"Second Thoughts"	April 7, 2015	0.59
As Keyshia and Daniel continue working out their co-parenting arrangement, she begins reconsidering her understanding of family and whether she should attempt to reconcile with Neffe.
8	"Never Say Never"	April 21, 2015	—
In the season finale, Keyshia reflects on the deterioration of her marriage and her ongoing feud with Neffe. She reaches out to her sisters and agrees to meet with Daniel, leaving open the possibility of repairing their relationships.

== Keyshia Cole: My New Life ==
In 2019, Cole returned to BET with Keyshia Cole: My New Life, a two-hour television special that premiered on November 18, 2019. It marked her return to reality television on the network after a four-year hiatus. The special follows Cole as she adjusts to a new chapter in her personal life with her boyfriend, musician Niko Khale, while preparing for the birth of her second child. It explores her pregnancy, past relationships, family life and music career.

Among those featured as cast members were Khale, Cole's son Daniel Gibson Jr., longtime friend Marquisha Miller and her mothers. Keyshia Cole: My New Life was produced by BET Networks, DuBose Entertainment and Hot Snakes Media. James DuBose and Eric Evangelista served as executive producers.
