= Keyshia Cole: This Is My Story =

2023 American television biographical film

- Genre: Biographical drama
- Teleplay by: Angelica Chéri
- Directed by: D'Angela Proctor; Manu Boyer
- Starring: Keyshia Cole; Debbi Morgan; Joseph C. Phillips; Tonia Jackson; Cindi Davis; Brittney Level
- Music by: Warryn Campbell
- Country of origin: United States
- Original language: English

Production
- Executive producers: Eric Tomosunas; Leslie Greif; D'Angela Proctor; Keyshia Cole
- Producers: Alex Kerr; Gold Morgan
- Cinematography: Roger Alexander
- Editor: Jared Bentley
- Running time: 87 minutes
- Production companies: Swirl Films; Big Dreams

Original release
- Network: Lifetime
- Release: June 24, 2023

Keyshia Cole: This Is My Story is a 2023 American television biographical film about American R&B singer Keyshia Cole. The film premiered on Lifetime on June 24, 2023, as part of the network's celebration of Black Music Month. It stars Cole as herself in her acting debut and Debbi Morgan as her late mother, Frankie Lons. The supporting cast includes Joseph C. Phillips, Tonia Jackson, Cindi Davis, and Brittney Level.

The film chronicles Cole's childhood in Oakland, California, her pursuit of a music career, and her eventual success as a recording artist. It also explores her complicated relationship with Lons, including her mother's struggles with substance abuse and their efforts to reconcile. Directed by D'Angela Proctor and Manu Boyer from a screenplay by Angelica Chéri, the film was produced by Swirl Films and Big Dreams. Cole also served as an executive producer. The film features the original song "Forever Is a Thing", written by Cole and Ron Fair in tribute to Lons.

== Plot ==
The film opens at the 2021 funeral of Keyshia Cole's biological mother, Frankie Lons, before flashing back to Cole's childhood in Oakland in 1997. Raised by Frankie, who struggles with drug addiction, Cole and her sister are eventually placed into foster care. Cole is adopted by Leon and Yvonne Coles, but maintains contact with her biological mother. As a teenager, she becomes increasingly interested in pursuing a singing career and frequently travels to Los Angeles to seek opportunities in the music industry.

Cole's ambitions create tension with her adoptive parents, particularly when she disobeys their rules. After being kicked out of their home, she experiences a period of instability and finds support through her church and older sister, Neffe. She eventually receives money that allows her to move to Los Angeles and pursue music more seriously. Before leaving, Frankie gives her a butterfly ring and promises that they will reunite once Cole becomes successful.

In Los Angeles, Cole struggles to establish herself, recording demos and contacting music industry executives. She eventually attracts the attention of producer and executive Ron Fair, who signs her to A&M Records when she is 21. As her career develops, she begins gaining recognition as a singer and reunites with her biological mother and sisters, Neffe and Elite. Her growing success also allows her to provide financial assistance to her family.

Despite Cole's accomplishments, Frankie's addiction continues to strain their relationship. After Frankie moves to Los Angeles and temporarily appears to have recovered, the family discovers evidence of her continued drug use. Cole and her relatives organize an intervention and arrange for Frankie to enter rehabilitation. Cole subsequently pitches a reality television series documenting her personal life, which becomes Keyshia Cole: The Way It Is.

As Cole's career progresses, she begins a relationship with former basketball player Daniel Gibson, known as Boobie. The film depicts their relationship, marriage, and the birth of their son. Meanwhile, Frankie's struggles with addiction continue, resulting in further confrontations between mother and daughter. Following Frankie's release from prison, Cole attempts to rebuild their relationship while balancing motherhood and her music career.

Cole's marriage eventually deteriorates amid disagreements over her professional commitments and personal relationships. She also experiences anxiety and difficulties maintaining her career. Frankie continues to struggle with addiction, repeatedly entering rehabilitation before relapsing.

The film returns to the funeral from its opening, revealing that Frankie died from an accidental opioid overdose on her 61st birthday in July 2021. Cole reflects on her relationship with her mother and performs "Forever Is a Thing" as photographs of the two appear during the closing credits.

== Cast ==
- Keyshia Cole as herself
- Debbi Morgan as Frankie Lons, Cole's biological mother
- Joseph C. Phillips as Leon, Cole's adoptive father
- Tonia Jackson as Yvonne Coles, Cole's adoptive mother
- Cindi Davis as Neffe, Cole's older sister
- Brittney Level as Elite Noel, Cole's younger sister
- Lindsey Blackwell as young Keyshia Cole
- Keon Black as Nutt-So
- Aspen Kennedy as Boobie
- Douglas Dickerman as Ron Fair
- Alfred E. Rutherford as Manny Halley

== Background and release ==
On March 8, 2023, Lifetime announced that it had commissioned a biographical film about Cole's life. The announcement confirmed that Cole would executive produce the project and make her acting debut by portraying herself. Debbi Morgan was announced as Frankie Lons, while D'Angela Proctor and Manu Boyer were selected to direct from a screenplay written by Angelica Chéri. The film was produced by Swirl Films and Big Dreams, with Eric Tomosunas, Leslie Greif, Proctor, and Cole serving as executive producers. Ron Fair served as co-executive producer and supervised the music, while Warryn Campbell composed the original score.

The film was dedicated to Lons, who died in July 2021 from an accidental opioid overdose on her birthday. In the announcement, Cole described the project as a tribute to her mother and the relationship they shared:

"This is a story of a daughter's love for her mother and although my heart remains broken from her untimely passing I am honored to be sharing it with the world. Playing the role of myself was a unique opportunity to re-live special moments in my life that also gave me the chance to process her loss in ways I did not expect. I miss her every day and even though she is not here, her presence was felt throughout this film. Mom, I love you."

— Keyshia Cole

Cole also discussed her reasons for participating in the film during an interview with People. She explained that portraying herself allowed her to revisit difficult experiences and process her mother's death, describing the project as "my way of making peace with a lot of things". She admitted that she initially hesitated to depict her mother's struggles with addiction, saying, "Part of me was like, 'I don't want to show her in that way.' But she had fans as well, and I thought it would be kind of selfish at this point."

A special screening and discussion of the film was held at the Grammy Museum in Los Angeles ahead of its television premiere. The discussion featured Cole and was moderated by Vibe journalist Mya Abraham. At the event, Cole discussed her early musical experiences and the personal significance of the project. She described the film as "a reflection of my life and my love that I have for my mom" and said she wanted it to serve as a lasting tribute to Lons for her family and children.

The film premiered on Lifetime on June 24, 2023, at 8 p.m. Eastern Time as part of the network's Black Music Month programming. Its release coincided with the debut of "Forever Is a Thing", a new song written by Cole and Fair. The track was co-produced by Fair, S1, and Sir Tim, and played during the closing credits. It served as a tribute to Lons and marked Cole's first new song release since 2021.

In an interview with Hollywood Life, Morgan discussed the emotional experience of portraying Lons opposite Cole, who was recreating events from her own life. She recalled, "Working with Keyshia, it was a journey and sometimes a bit challenging because of the fact that Keyshia Cole played herself." Morgan added that Cole was still grieving her mother during filming and that some of the confrontational scenes were particularly difficult. She described their on-screen relationship as having "a really strong connection" and praised Cole's performance, saying, "I thought she did a terrific job."

== Reception ==
Patrick Serrano of Lifetime Uncorked praised Morgan's portrayal of Lons, describing her performance as "stellar". He also highlighted the film's emotional ending, which featured Cole's tribute song and photographs of her mother. Serrano gave the film four out of five glasses of wine on his review scale. A review by That Darn Girl Movie Reviews awarded the film four out of five stars, praising its portrayal of the difficulties Cole experienced while pursuing a music career and supporting her family. The reviewer observed that "The movie needed another hour to focus on Keyshia and her career", concluded that "This story is as much about Frankie as it is about Keyshia" and said the film could help viewers develop "compassion for families coping with a loved one's addiction". According to Rotten Tomatoes, the film holds an audience approval rating of 78% based on fewer than 50 ratings.
