= Woman to Woman Tour =

2013 concert tour by Keyshia Cole

- Tour by Keyshia Cole
- Location: North America; Europe
- Associated album: Woman to Woman
- Start date: March 28, 2013
- End date: June 7, 2013
- Legs: 2
- No. of shows: 24
- Supporting acts: Chrisette Michele; Mateo

Keyshia Cole concert chronology
- Love Letter Tour (opening act for R. Kelly; 2011); Woman to Woman Tour (2013); Point of No Return Tour (2014)

The Woman to Woman Tour was a concert tour by American singer Keyshia Cole in support of her fifth studio album, Woman to Woman (2012). The tour began in Westbury, New York, on March 28, 2013, and visited 18 cities in North America before concluding in Oakland, California, on April 21. A six-date European leg followed between May 30 and June 7, with performances in the United Kingdom, Switzerland, France, and the Netherlands. The tour comprised 24 shows. Chrisette Michele was announced as a special guest for the North American leg, while Mateo joined the lineup in April.

== Background and development ==
In a November 2012 interview with the Los Angeles Times, Cole discussed her plans for a concert tour in support of Woman to Woman. She expressed interest in featuring other female singers, naming Brandy and Melanie Fiona as potential performers. "I want powerful singers," she explained, adding, "We're working that out right now, so that could be a February-March."

On February 18, 2013, Cole announced an 18-city North American leg, describing the tour as a way to thank her fans. Chrisette Michele was announced as a special guest, with the opening performance scheduled for March 28 at the Westbury Theatre in Westbury, New York. A ticket presale began on February 20. On April 2, Interscope Geffen A&M announced that Mateo had joined the tour as an opening performer, beginning with the Boston concert. The announcement also specified that Michele would not appear at the April 9 performance in Toronto.

Following the North American leg, Cole performed six dates in Europe from May 30 to June 7. The itinerary included three performances in the United Kingdom, followed by concerts in Switzerland, France, and the Netherlands.

== Concert synopsis ==
At the April 4 performance at the Beacon Theatre in New York City, Cole performed against a backdrop depicting Brooklyn brownstones and graffiti-covered garbage cans. She was accompanied by backup dancers and incorporated a reggae medley into the show.

The staging at the April 16 performance at the Verizon Theatre at Grand Prairie featured a city-block backdrop and a multilevel set with stairs leading to a bedroom. Cole performed alongside male and female dancers, while a bar scene was incorporated into one of the show's segments. The musical accompaniment included a DJ, drums, and keyboards.

A recurring feature of the concerts was Cole's invitation for an audience member to join her onstage during the performance of "Woman to Woman", which featured Ashanti. The selected fan performed Ashanti's verse alongside Cole. The segment was documented at the April 19 performance at Club Nokia in Los Angeles, where the two sang together before embracing at the end of the song.

== Critical reception ==
Reviewing the April 4 performance at the Beacon Theatre, Liz Ramanand of TheDrop.fm praised the production, describing it as "creative and very personal". She characterized Cole as "a conductor of energy" and commended her stage presence. Ramanand also praised Michele's vocals, calling them "the most spectacular part of the performance". Melody Charles of Mother of Color gave a more critical assessment of the April 16 Grand Prairie concert. Although she praised the breadth of Cole's repertoire, describing it as "five albums worth of hits", she concluded that the singer's "stage debut as a headliner left much to be desired". Charles criticized Cole's limited engagement with the audience, describing her as "alarmingly aloof to the crowd" throughout the performance. Imade Nibokun of LA Weekly also offered a mixed-to-negative assessment of the April 19 performance at Club Nokia. Nibokun criticized Cole's vocal delivery, describing her singing as "subpar", and characterized her interaction with the audience as having "a limp quality". The reviewer also compared her reliance on recorded vocals during "I Should Have Cheated" to karaoke. Reviewing Cole's June 4 performance at L'Olympia in Paris, Mélanie Parola of Melty noted that the concert lasted approximately an hour. Despite its length, she wrote that "la qualité de la prestation compense le peu de temps passé sur scène" (the quality of the performance compensated for the short time onstage).

== Set list ==
1. "Medley"
2. "I Changed My Mind"
3. "Zero"
4. "Get It Right"
5. "Missing Me"
6. "Hey Sexy"
7. "Wonderland"
8. "Give It Up to Me"
9. "Hip Hop Medley"
10. "Love"
11. "I Remember"
12. "I Should Have Cheated"
13. "Woman to Woman"
14. "Trust and Believe"
15. "Heaven Sent"
16. "Let It Go"
17. "Enough of No Love"

== Opening acts ==
- Chrisette Michele (North American leg; absent from the Toronto date)
- Mateo (joined the North American leg beginning April 2)
- Kayna Samet (special guest at the Paris performance)

== Tour dates ==
=== North America ===
North American dates (2013)
Date	City	Country	Venue
March 28, 2013	Westbury	United States	Westbury Theatre
March 29, 2013	Norfolk	United States	Chrysler Hall
March 30, 2013	Washington, D.C.	United States	Warner Theatre
April 2, 2013	Boston	United States	Orpheum Theatre
April 4, 2013	New York City	United States	Beacon Theatre
April 5, 2013	Wallingford	United States	Oakdale Theatre
April 6, 2013	Atlantic City	United States	Music Box at Borgata
April 7, 2013	Upper Darby Township	United States	Tower Theatre
April 9, 2013	Toronto	Canada	Danforth Music Hall
April 11, 2013	Detroit	United States	MotorCity Casino
April 12, 2013	Cleveland	United States	State Theatre
April 13, 2013	Merrillville	United States	Star Plaza Theatre
April 14, 2013	Indianapolis	United States	Murat Theatre
April 16, 2013	Grand Prairie	United States	Verizon Theatre at Grand Prairie
April 18, 2013	Phoenix	United States	Celebrity Theatre
April 19, 2013	Los Angeles	United States	Club Nokia
April 20, 2013	San Diego	United States	Humphrey's Concerts by the Bay
April 21, 2013	Oakland	United States	Fox Theater

=== Europe ===
European dates (2013)
Date	City	Country	Venue
May 30, 2013	Manchester	United Kingdom	The Ritz
May 31, 2013	London	United Kingdom	indigo2
June 1, 2013	Birmingham	United Kingdom	The Institute
June 3, 2013	Basel	Switzerland	Metro Club at Grand Casino Basel
June 4, 2013	Paris	France	L'Olympia
June 7, 2013	Amsterdam	Netherlands	The Sand
