= Keyshia Cole =

American singer (born 1981)

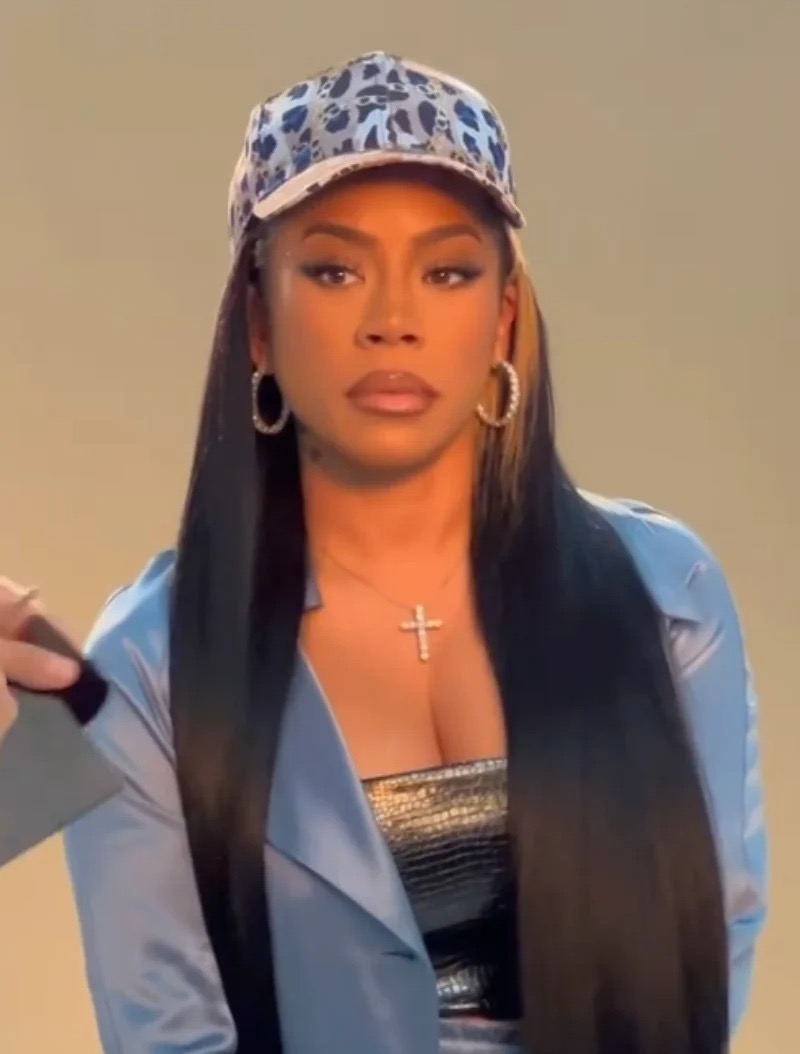
- Cole in 2022
- Born: Keyshia Myeshia Johnson; October 15, 1981 (age 45); Oakland, California, U.S.
- Education: Tracy High School
- Occupations: Singer; songwriter; television personality
- Years active: 1998–present
- Works: Discography; songs
- Spouse: Daniel Gibson (m. 2011; div. 2020)
- Children: 2
- Father: Virgil Hunter
- Awards: Full list
- Musical career
- Genres: R&B; hip-hop soul
- Instrument: Vocals
- Labels: BMG; Hearts and Stars; Epic; Imani; Interscope Geffen A&M
- Website: keyshiacoleofficial.com
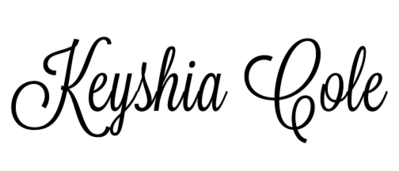

Keyshia Myeshia Cole (née Johnson; born October 15, 1981) is an American singer, songwriter, and television personality. Dubbed by music critics as the "Princess of Hip-Hop Soul", Cole's music is rooted in contemporary R&B and hip hop soul, with songwriting that draws on relationships and personal experiences. She possesses a soprano vocal range that has been described by critics as raspy and emotionally expressive.

Born and raised in Oakland, California, Cole began pursuing music professionally in the early 2000s after relocating to Los Angeles, working with Bay Area artists and producers before signing with A&M Records. Her debut studio album, The Way It Is (2005), debuted within the top 10 of the Billboard 200 and sold over one million copies in the United States; it spawned the commercially successful singles "I Should Have Cheated" and "Love". The album's success led to the creation of the BET reality television series Keyshia Cole: The Way It Is, which premiered in July 2006 and chronicled her personal life and career.

Her second album, Just like You (2007), was released through Geffen Records and Interscope Records following the closure of A&M Records and became the best-selling album of her career, debuting at number two and receiving a platinum certification for selling over one million copies in the US. Its lead single, "Let It Go" (featuring Lil' Kim and Missy Elliott), became Cole's highest-charting single as a lead artist, reaching number seven on the Billboard Hot 100. Her third album, A Different Me (2008), also sold over one million copies in the US, and was followed by her fourth album, Calling All Hearts, in 2010. Her fifth album, Woman to Woman (2012), featured the Hot 100-charting single "Enough of No Love" (featuring Lil Wayne) and coincided with the BET reality series Keyshia & Daniel: Family First, which chronicled Cole's family life and her work on the album. Her sixth album, Point of No Return (2014), was followed by the BET reality series Keyshia Cole: All In, which chronicled the tour supporting the album.

After departing Interscope, Cole joined the main cast of Love & Hip Hop: Hollywood during its fourth season in 2017. That same year, she released her seventh studio album, 11:11 Reset, via Epic Records. In 2019, Cole began hosting the Fox Soul talk show One on One with Keyshia Cole, which aired until 2020, and later established her independent record label Hearts and Stars with the support of BMG. Cole starred in and executive produced the Lifetime biographical film Keyshia Cole: This Is My Story, which premiered in June 2023. Cole co-headlined the Love Hard Tour in 2024 and then led The Way It Is 20th Anniversary Tour from 2025 to 2026.

== Early life ==
Keyshia Myeshia Johnson was born in Oakland, California on October 15, 1981. She is the biological daughter of Francine "Frankie" Lons (1960–2021), who struggled with alcohol and crack cocaine addiction, and boxing trainer Virgil Hunter, who was notably absent from her upbringing. The instability resulting from her mother's addiction, combined with the absence of her biological father, forced an early intervention in Cole's life; as a result, she was adopted at the age of two by family friends Leon and Yvonne Cole, subsequently changing her last name to Cole. Cole has biological and adopted siblings; including her brothers Sean and Sam, her younger sister Elite Noel, and her older sister Neffeteria "Neffe" Pugh.

At an early age, Cole discovered a passion for music. When she was 12 years old, her brother Sean (also known as Nutt-So), himself involved in local music, introduced her to MC Hammer, with whom she had the opportunity to record background vocals for. During this formative period, she also formed a friendship with rapper Tupac Shakur, who promised to support her burgeoning music career. Shakur was fatally shot in a drive-by shooting the same night he asked Cole to write a hook for his upcoming project at the time.

As a child, Cole played tag football, tetherball, and served as a junior lifeguard at Oakland's Fremont Pool. She spent her free time watching music-driven films and was an avid reader. At the age of 16, she became a participant at the East Oakland Youth Development Center (EOYDC), a local nonprofit dedicated to empowering young people through educational and recreational programs. Cole initially attended Fremont High School in Oakland before transferring to and graduating from Tracy High School in Tracy, California, in the class of 2000. Reflecting on her formative years, Cole stated, "My childhood was not easy. I went through a lot of trials and tribulations [...] no matter what their situation is, no matter where [you] come from, no matter where [you] are, no matter who [you] are - with faith, you can always accomplish your goals. I did it and survived, and so can [you]."

== Career ==
=== 1999–2006: Career beginnings and The Way It Is ===
At the age of 17, Cole departed from her foster home in Oakland to live with her then-boyfriend after her adoptive mother rejected her artistic ambitions. After discovering his infidelity, Cole soon moved from Oakland to Los Angeles to pursue a professional music career. Within weeks of arriving, she secured a day job and moved into one of three apartments owned by her uncle. Cole began working with Bay Area artists; appearing on the remix of Messy Marv's "Nubian Queen", featured on his third album Still Explosive (2001), and contributing backing vocals to the D'Wayne Wiggins–produced soundtrack for the independent film Me & Mrs. Jones (2002). Cole was initially poised to join a short-lived girl group called Grip while working with producer Damon Elliott. However, Elliott offered her a solo production contract instead, recognizing her talent. Reflecting on the opportunity, Cole stated, "I'd rather be solo because I do everything in the group anyway. They're just pretty. We were gonna get, like, a $30,000 advance and split it ten/ten/ten; but I figured, 'Why should I give them my $20,000 when I can get it myself?'". Cole ultimately declined the group deal and went on to record songs with Elliott. In 2002, Cole was introduced to A&M Records' A&R executive Ron Fair, who signed her to the label after hearing an unfinished demo, immediately mentoring her on artist development and studio production techniques.

Cole's first official release was the single "Never", featuring Eve, which appeared on the soundtrack of the Kevin Rodney Sullivan-directed comedy film Barbershop 2: Back in Business (2004); it combined hip-hop and funk beats with her vocals and was released to urban radio formats in March 2004. In anticipation of her debut album, Cole and DJ Green Lantern issued the mixtape, Team Invasion Presents Keyshia Cole in February 2005, featuring remixes of popular hip-hop instrumentals alongside original song snippets.

Cole released her debut album, The Way It Is, on June 21, 2005, through A&M Records; it debuted at number six on the US Billboard 200 and sold 89,000 copies in its first week. The album features guest appearances from Jadakiss, Chink Santana, Metro City and Eve; and was produced by Cole, Ron Fair, Sean Garrett, Kerry Brothers Jr., John Legend, Chink Santana and Kanye West, among others. It spawned the singles "I Changed My Mind", "(I Just Want It) To Be Over", "I Should Have Cheated" and "Love". All appeared within the top-40 of the Billboard's Hot R&B/Hip-Hop Songs chart, with "I Should Have Cheated", and "Love" reaching the top-ten. Upon its release, The Way It Is received generally positive reviews from music critics, who praised Cole's vocals and musical themes. It received a platinum certification by the Recording Industry Association of America (RIAA) and earned her several accolades, including an NAACP Image Award nomination and two Soul Train Music Award nominations at both ceremonies in 2006, respectively. To further promote the album, Cole served as a supporting act on Kanye West's Touch the Sky Tour, which took place from October to December 2005.

In June 2006, Cole was featured on "(When You Gonna) Give It Up to Me" by Sean Paul from the soundtrack of the romantic dance film Step Up (2006). It reached number three on the US Billboard Hot 100 and became a top-20 hit in several other countries, including Canada, Switzerland and Finland. On July 9, 2006, it was reported that Cole had signed with BET for a reality series, Keyshia Cole: The Way It Is. Chronicling her personal life, family dynamics and professional career, the series premiered three days following its announcement. The first season of the series, which consisted of six episodes, concluded on August 16, 2006.

=== 2007–2009: Just like You and A Different Me ===
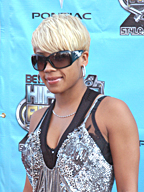
Cole at the BET Hip Hop Awards in 2007

After A&M Records folded through a merger with Octone Records in early 2007, Cole was drafted by the Universal Music Group and Interscope Records boss Jimmy Iovine to its subsidiary label Geffen Records. In March 2007, Cole was featured on Diddy's single "Last Night", taken from his fourth album Press Play (2006). A worldwide success, it reached the top-ten in over five countries, including the United States, where it spent 22 consecutive weeks charting on the Billboard Hot 100. At the 2007 BET Awards, "Last Night" received a nomination for Best Collaboration and was performed by the duo alongside Lil' Kim during the award ceremony.

On September 25, 2007, Cole released her second album Just like You, to generally favorable reviews from music critics. For the album, she worked with various producers, including Scott Storch, Rodney Jerkins, Bryan-Michael Cox, Cainon Lamb and The Runners, among others. A commercial success, the album debuted at number two on the US Billboard 200 and number one on the US Top R&B/Hip-Hop Albums charts, selling 281,000 copies in its first week and was certified platinum in the United States for sales of over a million copies. The lead single, "Let It Go" (featuring Missy Elliott and Lil' Kim), marked Cole's first top-ten hit on the US Billboard Hot 100 as a lead artist moreover her first number-one hit on Billboard's Hot R&B/Hip-Hop Songs; eventually receiving a platinum certification in the United States. The follow-up "Shoulda Let You Go" (featuring Amina Harris), reached number 41 on the Hot 100 and the top-ten of the Hot R&B/Hip-Hop Songs chart, peaking at number six. The third and fourth singles, "I Remember" and "Heaven Sent", both reached the top-30 of the Hot 100 and number-one on the Hot R&B/Hip-Hop Songs chart, spending seven and nine consecutive weeks at the summit, respectively. Cole received a variety of accolades for the album, including four Grammy Award nominations and three BET Award nominations.

Aside from her music success, Cole made her acting debut with a cameo role in the Ian Iqbal Rashid-directed film How She Move, released in January 2008 and grossed $8.6 million worldwide. Throughout early to mid-2008, Cole made several guest appearances on songs including the singles: "I Got a Thang for You" (with rapper Trina), "Boyfriend/Girlfriend" (with hip-hop quartet C-Side), and "Game's Pain" (with rapper The Game), respectively. Additionally, Cole was scheduled to make a cameo on Missy Elliott's album, Block Party, which was originally intended to be released that year. The third and final season of Keyshia Cole: The Way It Is premiered via BET on November 11, 2008, and marked the highest-rated season premiere for the network, with a total of 1.94 million viewers.

Cole's third album A Different Me was released on December 16, 2008. The album debuted at number two on the US Billboard 200 chart, with 322,000 copies sold in its first-week of sales, and received a platinum certification by the RIAA for selling more than a million copies. The singles, "Playa Cardz Right" (featuring Tupac Shakur), "You Complete Me" and "Trust" (with Monica), all reached the lower-half of the Billboard Hot 100 and the top-ten of the Hot R&B/Hip-Hop Songs chart. To promote the album, she served as a supporting act for Lil Wayne's I Am Music Tour, which ran from December 14, 2008, to April 10, 2009. Shortly after the tour ended, Cole embarked on her first headlining concert tour, A Different Me Tour, which began on May 13 and concluded on June 21, 2009. Throughout this time, Cole was featured as the cover artist on several magazines such as the January issues of Jet and WordUp!, the March 2009 issue of Vibe, and the summer 2009 final double-cover issue of King. (Note: Cited to multiple sources:) In November 2009, at the Soul Train Music Awards, Cole earned a nomination in the Best Collaboration category for "Trust" (with Monica).

=== 2010–2013: Calling All Hearts and Woman to Woman ===
On June 27, 2010, Cole returned to the public eye, filling in for Hayley Williams to perform the chorus to B.o.B's "Airplanes (Part II)" featuring Eminem during the 2010 BET Awards. Cole's fourth studio album, Calling All Hearts, was released on December 21, 2010, via Geffen Records. The album featured guest appearances from Nicki Minaj, Tank, Faith Evans, Timbaland, and her adoptive mother Yvonne Cole. The album's lead single, "I Ain't Thru" (featuring Nicki Minaj), premiered on November 23, 2010, with a Benny Boom–directed video shot on location in New York City. The follow‑up promotional single, "Long Way Down", was similarly accompanied by a Benny Boom–directed video starring Cole and her then-fiancé Daniel Gibson, which premiered in December 2010. Calling All Hearts received mixed to positive reviews from music critics and opened at number nine on the US Billboard 200 chart, selling 128,000 copies in its first week. In January 2011, Cole announced via Twitter that she had parted ways with longtime manager Manny Halley and left his Imani Entertainment label following the album's lower‑than‑expected sales and chart performance. The album's second official single, "Take Me Away", impacted urban contemporary radio in February 2011 and reached number 27 on Billboard's Hot R&B/Hip-Hop Songs. To support Calling All Hearts, Cole joined R. Kelly's Love Letter Tour as an opening act from June 16 to July 3, 2011, performing in arenas across the United States alongside Marsha Ambrosius and K. Michelle as part of the lineup announcement on April 19, 2011.

In September 2011, Cole began work on her fifth studio album, with a planned February 2012 release date for the then‑untitled record. That album, Woman to Woman, was released on November 19, 2012. In the United States, the album debuted at number 10 on the Billboard 200 chart, moving 96,000 copies in its first week and securing the number two spot on the Top R&B/Hip‑Hop Albums chart. The lead single from the album, "Enough of No Love" (featuring Lil Wayne), reached number 84 on the US Billboard Hot 100 and number seven on the Hot R&B/Hip-Hop Songs chart, marking her 12th top-ten entry on that chart. The album's second single, "Trust and Believe", peaked at number 32 on the Hot R&B/Hip-Hop Songs chart. Both singles were accompanied with music videos directed by Benny Boom. Woman to Woman showcased a production roster that consisted of Darhyl Camper, Harmony Samuels, Rodney Jerkins, T-Minus, Vidal, and Wonda, while its guest features included recording artists Lil Wayne, Meek Mill, Ashanti, Elijah Blake, and Robin Thicke.

Prior to the album's release, Cole's life and recording process were chronicled in the BET reality television series Keyshia & Daniel: Family First, which ran for eight episodes from October 9 to December 4, 2012, documenting her studio sessions, family dynamics, and relationship with then‑husband Daniel Gibson; the series averaged over one million viewers per episode in its initial run. Cole's second headlining concert tour, the Woman to Woman Tour, began in March 2013, in support of Woman to Woman. In October 2013, Cole released the music video for the album's third and final single, "I Choose You".

=== 2014–2018: Point of No Return and 11:11 Reset ===
In March 2014, Cole debuted the title and first two singles for her sixth studio album Point of No Return, "Rick James", which features American rapper Juicy J, and "Next Time (Won't Give My Heart Away)". On April 2, 2014, Cole and Australian rapper Iggy Azalea released a cover version of Diana Ross' "I'm Coming Out", for The Other Woman movie soundtrack. The second single from Point of No Return, "She", was released on June 24. Cole embarked on the Point of No Return Tour on July 12 in Rochester, New York; the tour included 22 dates that ran through to August 25. Point of No Return was released on October 7, 2014, featuring guest appearances from 2 Chainz, Juicy J, Future, Gavyn Rhone, Wale, and August Alsina. The album became Cole's third number-one R&B album and her sixth consecutive album to debut within the top 10 in the United States. All of the tracks on the album received music videos, which were released separately. The same month of the album's release, American singer K. Michelle announced that she and Cole would reportedly go on a tour together in January 2015.

In February 2015, Cole starred in her third BET reality series, Keyshia Cole: All In. The series followed her professional endeavors, parenthood, and family problems. With Cole serving as an executive producer, the series ran for eight episodes before concluding on April 21, 2015. In September 2015, Cole independently released the London on da Track-produced song "Don't Waste My Time" (featuring Young Thug) and her own remixed version of Drake's "Hotline Bling". That same year, Cole made two guest appearances on hip-hop albums. She was featured alongside J. Cole on "Black Heaven", a track from Boosie Badazz's Touch Down 2 Cause Hell (2015), and appeared on "Nothing to Me" with rapper E-40 from G-Eazy's When It's Dark Out (2015). On November 11, 2016, it was revealed that Cole had finished recording her then-upcoming seventh studio album and had signed a record deal with Epic Records.

On January 27, 2017, Cole released the lead single "You" (featuring Remy Ma and French Montana). In July, Cole joined the main cast for the fourth season of Love & Hip Hop: Hollywood. Before departing the show after the season concluded, Cole's plot revolved around her co-parenting arrangement with Gibson and her preparation for the release of her album. On August 25, 2017, Cole released the second single "Incapable". Cole's seventh album, 11:11 Reset, was released on October 20, 2017, featuring guest appearances from Remy Ma, French Montana, DJ Khaled, Young Thug, Kamaiyah, and Too $hort. Upon its release, the album debuted at number 37 on the US Billboard 200 and number 20 on the Top R&B/Hip-Hop Albums chart. On November 25, Cole made a guest appearance on Lip Sync Battle during its Soul Train special, where she lip-synced to "Car Wash" by Rose Royce. In August 2018, Cole performed at the third annual Black Music Honors.

=== 2019–present: Upcoming eighth studio album, Keyshia Cole: This is My Story and touring ===
On July 22, 2019, Cole announced that she would return with a BET-syndicated biographical documentary Keyshia Cole: My New Life, which premiered on November 18, 2019. The documentary followed Cole's pregnancy with her second child and her relationship with her then-boyfriend and baby's father, Niko Khale. On November 17, 2019, Cole performed a freestyle at the 2019 Soul Train Music Awards cypher. On December 23, 2019, she was featured on singer Kehlani's single "All Me". That same year, she began hosting her own talk show on the digital television network Fox Soul, One on One with Keyshia Cole. Described by Cole as "the show where we all come together and keep it real on everything from social media to social issues" prior to its premiere, the show aired through November 14, 2019 to May 2020.

In June 2020, it was reported that Cole had signed a management deal with talent management company Primary Wave, shortly after revealing that she had reunited with longtime friend and record producer Ron Fair, with whom she worked with for her first four albums. On July 22, 2020, speculations came out about a possible Verzuz battle between Cole and Ashanti after Cole publicly challenged her during the live streamed match between rappers DMX and Snoop Dogg. On December 2, 2020, Cole announced via her Instagram Live, while singing a few of her previous records, that she would soon be competing in a match. Two days later, it was confirmed that the then next Verzuz battle would be between Cole and Ashanti. The in-person competition was expected to take place on December 12, 2020, though it was postponed after Ashanti tested positive for COVID-19 ahead of the event. Nevertheless, the battle took place on January 21, 2021. On February 5, 2021, Cole released the standalone single "I Don't Wanna Be in Love", under her independent record label, Hearts and Stars, created with the support of BMG. In March 2021, Cole announced her intention to retire from the music industry after the release of her upcoming eighth studio album. At the Lights On Festival in Concord, California on September 18, 2021, Cole performed live for the first time since the death of her biological mother.

On January 11, 2022, Cole signed a global deal with the Creative Artists Agency (CAA). In March 2022, Cole was profiled and interviewed by Tami Roman for her own episode in the TV One documentary series, Uncensored. In support of her Lifetime-original biographical film, Keyshia Cole: This Is My Story, in which she starred in and executive produced, Cole released the standalone single "Forever Is a Thing" on June 23, 2023. Keyshia Cole: This Is My Story, which premiered on June 24, 2023, was inspired by the death of Cole's biological mother, along with other major events in her life and career. The film received three million viewers throughout its debut weekend and became one of Lifetime's highest rated films of that year. On September 12, 2023, Cole performed "Last Night" alongside Diddy during his Global Icon set at the MTV Video Music Awards. Through late 2023, Cole competed as "Candelabra" in the tenth season of The Masked Singer, finishing fifth place. In December 2023, Cole featured on the soundtrack to the film The Color Purple ("No Love Lost") and on the Gag City Edition of Nicki Minaj's fifth studio album Pink Friday 2 ("Love Me Enough" with Monica). In 2024, Cole headlined The Love Hard Tour; joined by co-headlining act Trey Songz and featured acts Jaheim and K. Michelle. The tour began on February 22, 2024 in Macon, Georgia and concluded on April 14, 2024 in Southaven, Mississippi. In October 2024, Cole featured on the deluxe edition of Elijah Blake's fourth studio album Elijah ("Every Little Thing") and Hunxho's second studio album Thank God ("Don't Let Me Down").

On April 17, 2025, Cole announced The Way It Is 20th Anniversary Tour, which began on July 1, 2025 in Baltimore, Maryland, and concluded on January 18, 2026 in Hanover, Maryland. The North American leg included stops in cities such as New York City, Atlanta, Detroit, and Los Angeles, before concluding the domestic run in January 2026. The tour also featured a European leg, announced in conjunction with the North American dates, which took place through September 2025. Supporting acts on the tour included Tink, Wale, Lil' Kim, Fridayy, and Jeremih, with appearances varying by date. Around that time, Cole also served as a supporting act on selected US dates of Brandy and Monica's co-headlining The Boy Is Mine Tour from December 4, 2025, to December 14, 2025. The Boy Is Mine Tour featured rotating guest performers across its North American run and was produced by the Black Promoters Collective. In July 2026, Cole featured on Masego's third studio album Fix Your Face ("Someone").

== Artistry ==
=== Voice and musical style ===
Ultimately, music is to reflect the artist and their artistry. I've been pretty true to that. I do appreciate my fans and I love them for being supportive from the beginning. When I'm recording, I always think about them. I always hear, 'Girl, you helped me get through a bad breakup' and 'Girl, you helped me get through my marriage,' things to that extent, so I'm always trying to look out for my fans but [at the same time] it's ultimately reflective of my life.

— Keyshia Cole, Vibe

Cole possesses the vocal range of a soprano, in which the Los Angeles Times has described her as a "raspy soprano" capable of communicating "pain and anguish" with equal force. Alison Fensterstock of Gambit praised Cole's "thrilling, emotion‑drenched soprano" voice, noting its "urban grit that adds a rough edge to the studio shimmer and acrobatic vocalizing". Jim Farber of the New York Daily News described her voice as having a "flexible range of R&B, the muscular punch of soul and the hard character of hip-hop" and suggested that it contains a "smoky flavor, and a husky texture." A Billboard album roundup noted Cole's "command of vocal talent", observing how she "exhibits a growing confidence" through her vocal delivery. Cole has openly acknowledged that she never took formal vocal lessons and she credits her hardships for forging the power and authenticity in her voice.

Cole's songwriting process is characterized by an immediate and intuitive connection to music. She has stated, "When I hear something, I hear it — it doesn't take me three, four, five times to hear a song and say, 'OK, let's write.' If I don't write to it right off the bat, it's not working." The New York Times' Kelefa Sanneh wrote that she "sings love stories that could almost be war stories", highlighting the emotional weight of her songwriting. Her musical approach has been described as a "forthright approach to soul‐rooted R&B". MVRemix observed that she "brings back what many other R&B singers leave behind; soul" and appended that "she sings with enough grit and evokes enough heartache to make your mother feel it." BroadwayWorld commented that Cole delivers her music with "unfiltered storytelling, powerhouse vocals, and signature blend of vulnerability and strength". H&S Magazine dubbed her "a powerhouse in modern R&B", emphasizing how she "plays a pivotal role in bridging the worlds of hip-hop and soul" through her blend of emotional depth and resilience.

In praising her musical evolution, critics also highlighted Cole's distinct vocal delivery across multiple projects. Entertainment Weekly noted that on her debut studio album The Way It Is, "Cole's street‑savvy Oakland upbringing gives her vocals depth and her songs a genuine, lived-in feel", underscoring how her background informed her musical sound. In reviewing her second album Just like You, The Boston Globe described her as "a singer to be reckoned with, particularly in an urban market saturated with imitators", emphasizing her standout presence within the R&B genre. For her third album A Different Me, Ken Capobianco of The Boston Globe wrote that Cole "dares to be different—and pretty great", highlighting her exploration of a "sweeter and supremely sexy side" in her sound, and USA Today confirmed that "the still‑evolving singer just keeps getting better", signaling consistent artistic growth. Celebrating her fifth album Woman to Woman, Entertainment Weekly's Tanner Stransky called it a "time machine to the sweet, soulful R&B of the late '90s", applauding Cole's vocal delivery on standout tracks.

=== Stage ===
Cole's live performances have garnered a spectrum of critical responses, reflecting both her strengths and areas for growth as a performer. AllHipHop praised her efforts to revitalize R&B, noting that she was "trying to resurrect" the genre through her intimate venue performances. Similarly, during a 2008 concert at the Oakland Arena, Gabe Meline lauded Cole's performance as "completely goddamn dominating", describing it as a "nonstop firestorm of talent and amazement". The reviewer observed that she had evolved from "all energy and empty hyperactivity" to a performer who "retained the energy and tempered it with elegance and grace". G. Valentino Ball of Bay State Banner described Cole's stage presence as "infectious", with her candid banter resonating authentically with the audience. Ball noted that her interactions felt genuine, suggesting a deep connection with her fans.

Not all critics have been uniformly complimentary, however. In May 2009, Evan Rytlewski writing for The Shepherd Express described one of her A Different Me Tour concerts as featuring "countless similarly tense, tear‑soaked numbers about romantic strife", and even quipped about her "aerobic, high‑production concert" as verging on melodrama, writing: "watching Cole dance her way up a steep, seemingly unstable set of stage stairs in a pair of four‑inch heels, I feared the crappy boyfriend she's always singing about might have taken out a life insurance policy on the R&B star." A review from SoulTracks on one of Cole's shows during her Woman to Woman Tour pointed out that while she delivered a string of hits, her performance was marked by a "perfunctory manner" and an "alarmingly aloof" demeanor, suggesting missed opportunities for deeper audience connection.

=== Influences ===
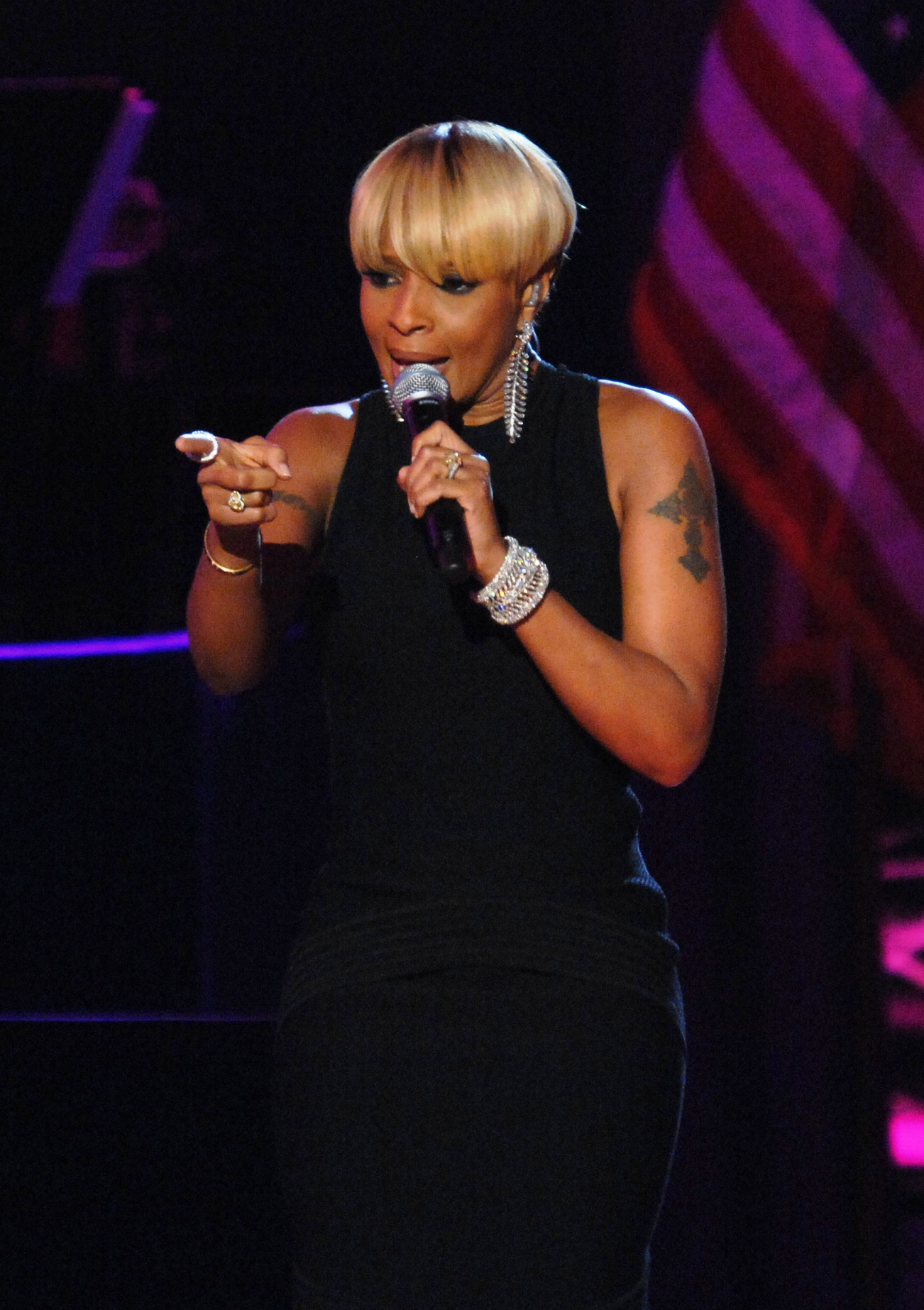
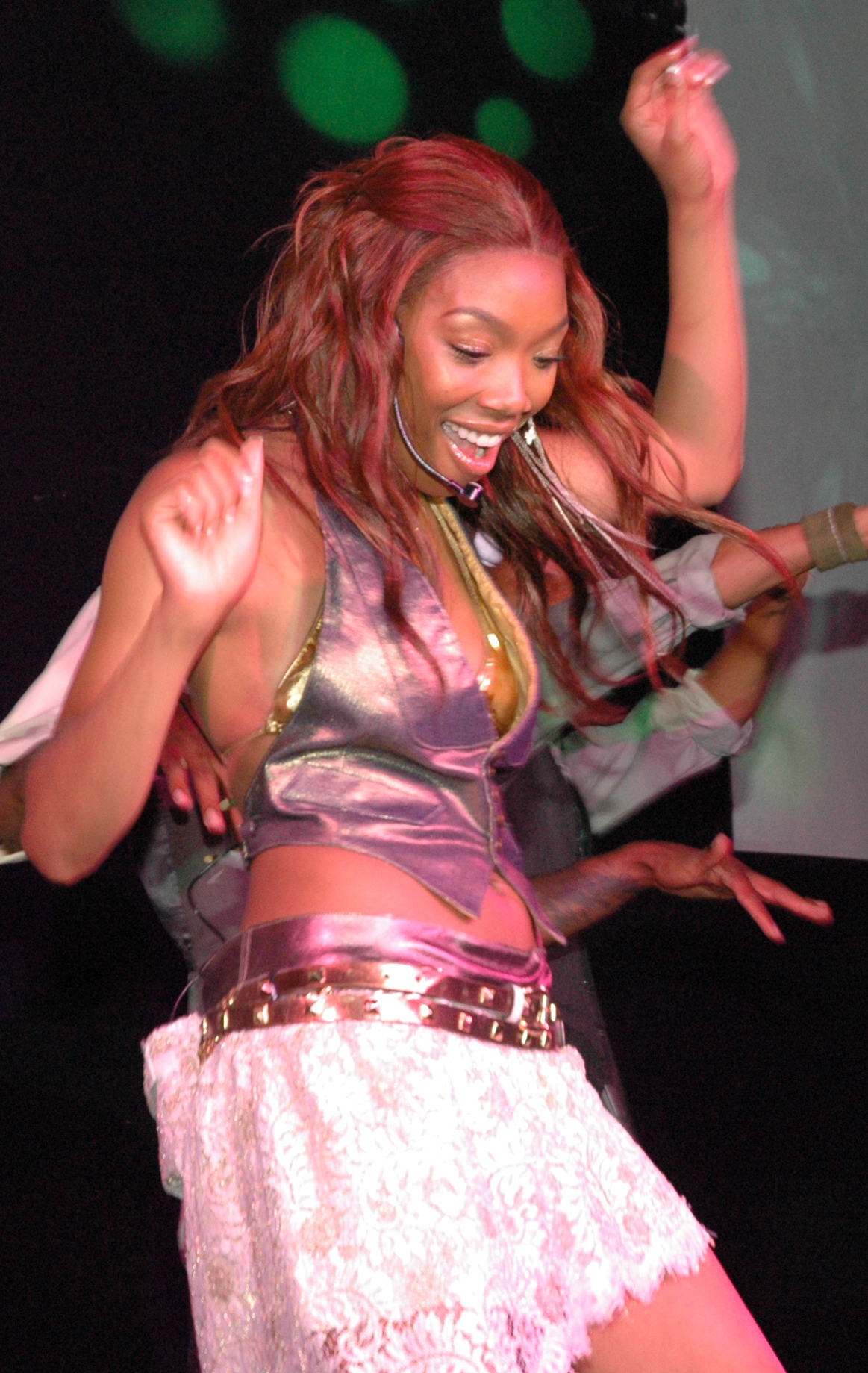
Mary J. Blige (left) and Brandy Norwood (right) both prominently influenced Cole and her music.

Cole grew up listening to her mentor Tupac Shakur, and in an interview with the Jamaica Observer, she named him as one of the artists that influenced her "soulful" style. In a 2004 interview, she emphasized that vocally she aimed to blend "Mary [J. Blige] mixed with Brandy", and personally looked up to both Monica and Brandy for demonstrating how young women could command respect in music. Cole has cited Blige as one of her greatest influences, and throughout her career she has been compared to or described as a "direct musical descendant" of Blige.

Cole addressed the comparisons to Blige in a 2007 appearance on The Tyra Banks Show, saying, "I love Mary, she is so powerful [...] She's a wonderful figure to be like. For people to compare me to her, I definitely think that's strength. But yeah, I don't know if I'm the next Mary." In 2011, Cole covered Blige's version of "I'm Going Down" while opening for R. Kelly during his Love Letter Tour. Other than Blige, Cole has named Brandy as one of her main influences and has indicated that Brandy's success inspired Cole to pursue music, adding, "I thought if she could do it, I definitely could do it."

Cole has also mentioned Faith Evans, Toni Braxton, and Chanté Moore as major musical influences and has acknowledged the impact of Aaliyah and Alicia Keys.

== Other ventures ==
In June 2005, Cole appeared in a Southpole apparel advertising campaign published in Vibe, modeling pieces from the brand's women's collection. In May 2006, Cole was selected to serve as the face of Akademiks' Ladies Fall/Holiday advertising campaign for the urban wear and accessories brand, appearing in promotional materials for its women's line. In 2008, Cole partnered with Luster Products to endorse their relaunched Pink Brand Smooth Touch hair care line. The campaign featured Cole in advertising, product packaging, and "A Day in the Life" online videos, with promotional efforts spanning radio, print, in-store events, and grassroots marketing to enhance brand visibility.

In October 2012, it became public knowledge that Cole and shoe designer Steve Madden, had collaborated on a three-piece shoe collection that was initially slated to debut one month later. During an appearance with WWPR-FM's The Breakfast Club, she discussed the collection and said:

I've been talking about this Steven Madden deal for about four years now. [...] I wanted to do a deal with Steven Madden is because, when I didn't have any money and before I got my deal, I use to buy Steve Madden shoes. So I just want to make sure that I do really cute shoes that my demographic can afford. [The shoes will debut in] November. I've already made all three and they will be featured in my videos and in the album packaging.

On July 26, 2013, Cole posted images of shoes from the collection. In September 2013, the shoe line was launched and included seven heel styles ranging from pumps to booties to tall boots. In support of the launch, Cole embarked on a personal appearance tour; the tour began on September 19 at Pentagon City Mall in Arlington, Virginia, continued on September 21 at Towson Town Center in Towson, Maryland, and concluded on September 26 at Lenox Square Mall in Atlanta, Georgia. A second range of shoes were introduced in March 2014. Regarding his collaboration with Cole, Madden stated: "Keyshia is great to work with. She brings fresh ideas to the table, and knows what girls want. It was a pleasure to work with her again."

In December 2021, Cole partnered with hair grooming company Red by Kiss, launching a line of bonnets and headscarves. The collaboration, released under the name Silky Stylez x Keyshia Cole, was part of a range of protective hair accessories distributed under the Red by Kiss brand, a division of KISS New York. The line included multiple bonnet variants and satin headwraps marketed for use in protective hairstyling.

== Philanthropy ==
In September 2008, Cole contributed to the song "Just Stand Up!" with fifteen other female artists, who shared the stage to perform the song live on September 5, 2008, during the "Stand Up to Cancer" television special. The proceeds from the single were given to the fundraiser. The television special helped raise $100 million for cancer research. On October 29, 2008, Cole was honored with the Dr. Betty Bahiyah Shabazz Award by the Black Cotton Foundation, a nonprofit organization in the New York metropolitan area, alongside former Black Panther Party leader Ericka Huggins. This award recognized their consistent and positive contributions to their communities, and the ceremony took place at Malcolm X and Dr. Betty Shabazz Memorial and Educational Center in NYC.

On April 30, 2011, Cole performed at the Revlon Run/Walk for Women in NYC, an event focused on raising awareness and funds for women's cancer research. In August 2011, Cole and her then-husband Daniel Gibson contributed to the "Braids & Fades" event in Cleveland, Ohio, by donating school supplies through their foundation. The event, organized by Radio One Cleveland and sponsored by Villa, provided free haircuts, hairstyles, and school supplies to 300 underprivileged children. On September 30, 2012, Cole returned to her hometown in Oakland, California to celebrate the fifth annual Keyshia Cole Day at the East Oakland Sports Center, an event she initiated in 2008 when the City of Oakland proclaimed August 8 as Keyshia Cole Day in recognition of her musical achievements. The event included live entertainment, food, and children's activities.

In January 2015, Cole made a public donation to the family of Oscar Grant, an unarmed African-American man who was fatally shot by a police officer in Oakland, California.

== Personal life ==
Cole has spoken publicly about her Christian faith and has described it as an important influence on her personal life and values, crediting her upbringing for shaping her spiritual beliefs. Cole has openly recounted promising God to stop using marijuana once she secured a recording deal and has stated that any future partner "must have a strong relationship with God" to be compatible with her faith-centered values.

In 2014, Cole was in a relationship with rapper and record executive Birdman. In September of that year, she was arrested in Los Angeles on a misdemeanor battery charge following an altercation at Birdman's residence. A civil lawsuit related to the incident was later filed against Cole and was resolved in December 2017, when she was ordered to pay a financial settlement after failing to appear in court.

Cole has also been involved in civil disputes with property owners. In June 2016, a former landlord filed a lawsuit following her eviction from a Santa Monica rental property, alleging unpaid rent and property damage. In October 2019, another homeowner alleged damage to a rental property in Marina del Rey; Cole disputed the claim, attributing the damage to a malfunctioning aquarium system installed during the filming of the television series Tanked.

In January 2025, Cole's Los Angeles residence was destroyed during the Palisades Fire, resulting in the loss of her family's belongings.

=== Relationships ===
Between November 2005 to October 2007, Cole was discreetly involved in a romantic relationship with rapper Jeezy. During a 2008 interview with Vibe, Jeezy alleged that Cole had proposed to him, stating: "Keyshia asked me to marry her, bought me a ring and everything. [She's] not gonna tell you different. I was grown enough to tell her, 'Look, baby, that isn't what it is right now. I'm trying to get my shit together. I'm trying to get my money, take care of me and mine."

Cole began dating NBA player Daniel Gibson in May 2009, announcing their engagement and her pregnancy in January 2010. On March 2, 2010, she gave birth to her son, Daniel Hiram Jr., with Gibson. The couple were married at a ceremony in Las Vegas, on May 21, 2011, before renewing their vows in Hawaii in September 2011. The entire wedding weekend was filmed and aired on Keyshia and Daniel: Family First, in October 2012. In March 2014, Cole confirmed during an interview on The Breakfast Club that she and Gibson were separated, succeeding the rumors that Gibson had cheated on Cole with an exotic dancer. In April 2017, Cole announced that they had filed for divorce, which was finalized on September 3, 2020.

On May 3, 2019, Cole announced that she was expecting her second child, with her then-boyfriend Niko Khalé. Cole gave birth to her second son, Tobias Khalé, on August 1, 2019. In October 2020, Khalé confirmed that he and Cole had ended their relationship. In April 2022, Cole was briefly linked to former NFL wide receiver Antonio Brown. Their short-lived fling garnered media attention but did not develop into a serious relationship. In April 2024, Cole was seen at a nightclub in Atlanta, Georgia, with rapper Hunxho, sparking rumors of a romance. The speculation was confirmed when Hunxho publicly revealed that he and Cole were dating. On March 16, 2025, Cole confirmed that she and Hunxho had split. In July 2026, Cole began dating rapper Skrilla.

=== Family ===
Frankie & Neffe, a 10-episode BET spin-off of Keyshia Cole: The Way It Is, debuted on August 25, 2009, and followed the lives of Cole's mother Frankie Lons and her older sister Neffeteria Pugh. According to reports, Cole was displeased with the series and her family's attempts to exploit their lives for reality television. In December 2011, Lons published her memoir The Best Years I Never Had, which detailed her personal hardships. Cole asserted in a December 2012 interview on BET's 106 & Park that she was biracial, despite not knowing her father's true identity or race at the time. The reason for this was that Cole's mother claimed an unknown Italian man was Cole's biological father. In May 2016, Cole met her biological father, Virgil Hunter, after a paternity test confirmed their connection.

As displayed on Keyshia Cole: The Way It Is, Cole and her sister Neffeteria had a tense relationship. Pugh's autobiographical book The Price I Paid, which was published in 2012, was perceived as a "tell-all book" that mainly discussed her relationship and disputes with Cole. Pugh claimed that the book explores her life and the lives of her family following their appearances on reality TV. In a series of tweets on January 10, 2013, Cole vented her annoyance at the book. Through an Instagram post, Pugh publicly apologized to Cole on March 19, 2018, for their prior disagreements.

In March 2021, Cole's younger sister Elite Noel disclosed on her Instagram story that she was estranged from Cole.

Cole's mother, Lons, died on July 18, 2021, from a drug overdose. On November 14, 2021, Cole announced that her adoptive father, Leon Cole, Jr., died from complications from COVID-19. While struggling to cope with both losses, Cole was hospitalized following an anxiety attack, in May 2022.

== Controversies ==
Cole has been involved in several public controversies related to comments made in social media and disputes with other musicians. The dispute between Cole and Lil' Mo is believed to have begun around 2005. In an interview with HipHollywood on April 3, 2013, Lil' Mo disparaged Cole, citing Cole's divisive tirade against Beyoncé's "Bow Down (I Been On)" from the previous month, stating: "Sit down, get off Twitter, if you can't handle it, keep your opinions to yourself. Who is your publicist? Who is tweeting for you?". Cole instantly reacted, captioning an Instagram picture with the words: "You gotta be able to smile through the bullsh--". Lil' Mo again dissed Cole during an appearance with The Breakfast Club on May 2, 2013. She went so far as to mention Cole as a vocalist she thinks she can surpass vocally. Amid rumors that Cole had thrown eggs at the car of rapper Bow Wow (with whom Cole was rumored to have dated at the time), Lil' Mo dubbed Cole a "thot" on an episode of her podcast, The Lil' Mo Show, on March 11, 2016.

Cole negatively tweeted about Michelle Williams' Super Bowl XLVII halftime show performance on February 4, 2013, when she performed onstage alongside fellow Destiny's Child members, Kelly Rowland and Beyoncé. Because of this, Cole faced online criticism from supporters. Cole said that Williams' accusation that Cole had utilized an auto-tune microphone at a prior Soul Train Music Awards performance was the reason behind it. In a March 2013 interview with Rolling Stone, Kelly Rowland responded to a query on the circumstances by saying, "We matter to a lot more people, with all due respect, than her. So, I really don't care what she said". Williams addressed the matter in a September 2013 interview with Hot 107.9's morning show in Philadelphia, Pennsylvania, stating: "I don't even do twitter beef [...] Can't wait to see [Keyshia Cole] in person so we can talk and say, 'Hey, what happened?'". Later that month, both Williams and Cole publicly made amends over the situation.

In March 2013, Cole posted a rant on her Twitter page, in which she criticized Beyoncé for her audio track "Bow Down (I Been On)". (Note: Cited to multiple sources:) As a result, Cole received backlash from urban media outlets and fans of Beyoncé. American singer-songwriter and record producer The-Dream announced in an interview on April 3, 2013, that he would no longer be working with Cole because of the situation. Previously, The-Dream wrote Cole's song "Hey Sexy" from her Woman to Woman album. Cole responded to this by tweeting that it was fine for him to not work with her again. In an interview on March 20, 2014, Cole explained why she tweeted a rant about the song, saying: "I was not hating on Beyoncé. It was not directed at all as hate. I love Beyoncé. I've seen Beyoncé a few times. She's always a very sweet girl. To me, that just wasn't her thing. Like dude said, she switched it up or something. But that's just not what I know of her, so it kinda hurt my feelings." In an October 2018 interview, Cole stated that she loves Beyonce and looks up to her, clarifying that her intentions were not to ignite a feud.

On December 7, 2019, O.T. Genasis released "Never Knew", a parody of Cole's 2005 song "Love". Cole voiced her disapproval of the song during a One on One with Keyshia Cole episode; the video was then taken down from YouTube. This resulted in social media exchanges and insults between Cole and Genasis. Presumably, their feud was resolved when Genasis sung "Love" with Cole during her Verzuz battle in January 2021. During her Love Hard Tour concert in Los Angeles, California on March 30, 2024, Cole invited Genasis to the stage, where he performed two songs and then publicly apologized to Cole in front of the crowd.

In December 2021, Cole publicly criticized Muni Long for taking a song she had written for Cole and giving it to another musician without getting Cole's permission. In response, Long revealed that she had done this because of Cole declaring that she would soon be retiring from music and possibly scrapping her album.

== Legacy and achievements ==
As of 2025, Cole has sold over 15 million albums worldwide. In 2010, Billboard's The Juice ranked Cole at number 28 on their list of Top 50 R&B/Hip-Hop Artists of the Last 25 Years, and she was subsequently honored in Billboard's all-time Greatest R&B/Hip-Hop Artists compilation. Furthermore, she was ranked 63rd on Complex's The 100 Hottest Female Singers of All Time and 27th on Forbes' 50 Black Female Singers with Incredible Vocals lists. On Billboard's Top Women Artists of the 21st Century list in 2025, the author noted that her first six studio albums each reached the top-ten of the US Billboard 200, that she secured seven top-40 hits on the US Billboard Hot 100 and that "her biggest stretch aligned with R&B's heyday in the mid-2000s", leading to her placement within the list.

As Revolt observed, "Her influence can still be heard in the artists who follow in her footsteps", reflecting Cole's imprint on music. American singer Betty Wright listed Cole as one of the artists who she believed were "still holding the torch" for R&B music. Referred to as "The Princess of Hip-Hop Soul", Cole has been credited as one of the most influential R&B singers. Cole has been credited as an influence or inspiration by Ahzie, Celestia, Cocona, Chxrry, Giveon, Hyejin, Kanii, Lay Bankz, Layton Greene, Mariah Angeliq, Ray BLK, Rayven Justice, Riley Lanezz, Tiana Kocher, and Queen Naija.

== Discography ==
- The Way It Is (2005)
- Just like You (2007)
- A Different Me (2008)
- Calling All Hearts (2010)
- Woman to Woman (2012)
- Point of No Return (2014)
- 11:11 Reset (2017)

== Tours ==
Headlining

- A Different Me Tour (2009)
- Woman to Woman Tour (2013)
- Point of No Return Tour (2014)
- The Way It Is 20th Anniversary Tour (2025)

Co-headlining

- Love Hard Tour (with Trey Songz) (2024)

Opening act

- R. Kelly - Double Up Tour (2007)
- R. Kelly - Love Letter Tour (2011)

Supporting act

- Nelly - Sweatsuit Tour (2005)
- Kanye West - Touch the Sky Tour (2005)
- Lil Wayne - I Am Music Tour (2008)
- Brandy and Monica - The Boy Is Mine Tour (2025)

Promotional tours

- Just like You Promo Tour (2007)

== Filmography ==
Sources were adapted from TV Guide.

=== Films ===
List of film appearances
Year	Title	Role	Notes
2005	Dave Chappelle's Block Party	Herself	Documentary-concert film
2007	How She Move	Herself	
2018	Charming	Cinderella #2	
2023	Keyshia Cole: This Is My Story	Herself	Television film

=== Television ===
List of television credits
Year	Title	Role	Notes
2005	All of Us	Herself	Episode: "Hollywood Swinging"
2006–2008	Keyshia Cole: The Way It Is	Herself	33 episodes
2008	Snoop Dogg's Father Hood	Herself	Episode: "Snow in da Hood"
2008	Paris Hilton's My New BFF	Herself	
2008	What Perez Sez	Herself	Episode: "About Divas"
2012	Keyshia & Daniel: Family First	Herself	8 episodes Also executive producer
2015	Keyshia Cole: All In	Herself	8 episodes Also executive producer
2017	Love & Hip Hop: Hollywood	Herself	16 episodes
2017	Lip Sync Battle	Herself	Episode: "Soul Train Special"
2017	Ridiculousness	Herself	Episode: "Keyshia Cole"
2018	Wild 'n Out	Herself	Episode: "Keyshia Cole/Smokepurpp"
2018	Tanked	Herself	Episode: "Keyshia Cole's Dream Tank"
2018	Hip Hop Squares	Herself	Episode: "Gunplay vs. Tommie"
2019	Keyshia Cole: My New Life	Herself	Biographical documentary Also executive producer
2019–2020	One on One with Keyshia Cole	Host	Talk show
2022	Uncensored	Herself	Episode: "Keyshia Cole"
2023	The Masked Singer	Herself/Candelabra	Season 10 contestant
