= Frankie & Neffe =

American reality television show

- Genre: Reality
- Created by: DuBose Entertainment
- Developed by: James DuBose
- Presented by: DuBose Entertainment
- Starring: Neffeteria Pugh; Frankie Lons
- Country of origin: United States
- Original language: English
- No. of seasons: 1
- No. of episodes: 10

Production
- Executive producer: James DuBose
- Production location: Oakland, CA
- Running time: 30 minutes (including commercials)

Original release
- Network: BET
- Release: August 29, 2009

Related
- Keyshia Cole: The Way It Is; Keyshia Cole: All In; Keyshia & Daniel: Family First

Frankie & Neffe is an American reality television show by James DuBose. It is a spin-off of the Keyshia Cole reality television show Keyshia Cole: The Way It Is, broadcast by Black Entertainment Television on August 25, 2009 and presented by DuBose Entertainment. The series chronicled the lives of Frankie Lons and Neffeteria Pugh, the mother and sister of R&B singer Keyshia Cole. The season finale was broadcast on Tuesday October 6, 2009, at 10/9c.

== Episode list ==
=== Season 1 ===
1. "Starting Over" - Frankie and Neffe try to start new lives.
2. "Baby Steps" - Frankie gets her first job as a radio personality.
3. "Man Down" - Neffe takes the advice of her life coach and attempts to build more trust with her mother, Frankie. Neffe takes her children to Frankie's condo to spend the night for the first time. Neffe admits to her sister Elite that she is having second thoughts on marrying Soullow.
4. "Mother Knows Best" - Neffe does something for her stepson on his birthday. Frankie admits that she worries about everyone else including Soullow and that she is uncapable.
5. "Church Home" - Jaylyn takes the spotlight by being baptized in a church. Neffe wanted Frankie to support her grandson in that moment but she had to go to work.
6. "The Christening" - Frankie was not supporting her grandson when he was being baptized in church. Frankie had to go to work at V103.
7. "Lifting as We Climb" - Soullow and Neffe have a huge difference of opinion.
8. "D Day" - Frankie is turning over a new leaf or, in this case, making a serious relationship with Neffe. Frankie has a dinner date with Yvonne.
9. "Celebration in Order" - Frankie pays a visit to see her family back in Oakland and Neffe goes along.
10. "Reunited" - Frankie and Neffe have a final meeting with their life coach at Baltimore Row, and look over the writings they accumulated.
