= A Different Me =

Studio album by Keyshia Cole
- Released: December 16, 2008
- Genres: Pop; R&B
- Length: 53:48
- Labels: Imani; Geffen; Interscope
- Producers: Keyshia Cole (exec.); Manny Halley (exec.); Ron Fair (exec.); Polow da Don; The Runners; the Outsyders; Kwamé; Orthodox & Ransom; Carvin & Ivan; Toxic; Tank; Jason T. Miller; Theron "Neffu" Feemster; Reo; The ARE; Poke & Tone; Spandor

Keyshia Cole chronology
Just like You (2007)	A Different Me (2008)	Calling All Hearts (2010)

Singles from A Different Me
- 1. "Playa Cardz Right" Released: October 7, 2008; 2. "You Complete Me" Released: January 20, 2009; 3. "Trust" Released: April 21, 2009

A Different Me is the third studio album by American singer Keyshia Cole. It was released by Geffen Records in association with Imani Entertainment and Interscope Records on December 16, 2008, in the United States. Cole reteamed with producers Toxic, Ron Fair and The Runners to work on A Different Me, but also worked with a variety of additional collaborators on new material, including Polow da Don, The Outsyders, Kwamé, Carvin & Ivan, Tank, Theron Feemster, and Poke & Tone. Guest appearances include Amina, Nas, Monica and 2Pac.

The album received generally positive reviews from critics who complimented it for its free-spirited and adventurous nature. A Different Me debuted and peaked at number two on the US Billboard 200, selling 322,000 copies in its first week of release. It was eventually certified platinum by the Recording Industry Association of America (RIAA) and became the third highest-selling R&B/Hip-Hop album of 2009. A Different Me spawned the singles "Playa Cardz Right", "You Complete Me", and "Trust", all of which entered the top ten of the US Hot R&B/Hip-Hop Songs.

== Conception ==
A Different Me focuses less on heartache and more on maturity of her vocals and lyrics. Cole explained that, "The first two albums were more...painful. It's a different me this time: a young woman who's still growing and finding myself, exploring life through different routes musically and in other areas. I wrote more about other people's situations than my own. I'm moving forward." On the songwriting process, Cole stated, "When I hear something, I hear it—it doesn't take me three, four, five times to hear a song and say, 'OK, let's write.' If I don't write to it right off the bat, it's not working." All the songs on the album were written or co-written by Cole. Guest appearances include Amina, Nas, Monica and 2Pac. Along with the album, Cole was developing a movie based on her life. A screenwriter has develop the script with Cole in 2009.

== Release and promotion ==
Before the album was released, BET released the third and final season of her reality show, Keyshia Cole: The Way It Is which showed her in the process of finishing the album and writing a movie. Guests during the season include Ron Fair, Polow Da Don, Monica, and Shirley Murdock. Cole also embarked on the I Am Music Tour in late 2008 and A Different Me Tour in the summer of 2009. She was featured in magazines Billboard, WordUp and VIBE from winter of 2008 to spring of 2009.

The album was released on December 16, 2008. Earlier that week, Cole made an appearance on BET's 106 and Park being interviewed and introducing the video to lead single "Playa Cardz Right" featuring Tupac Shakur. The song was released on October 7, 2008, and originally appeared on Tupac's album Pac's Life, but was rearranged by Cole and producers Ron Fair and Carvin & Ivan. It peaked at number nine on Billboard's US Hot R&B/Hip-Hop Songs. Second single "You Complete Me" featured on Cole's Myspace page in December and officially released on January 20, 2009. It peaked at number seven on the US Hot R&B/Hip-Hop Songs.

Third single "Trust" was originally recorded as a solo by Cole and released as an iTunes bonus track to her previous project, Just like You. The song was rerecorded featuring vocals from R&B singer and friend, Monica. It peaked at number five on the US Hot R&B/Hip-Hop Songs, becoming the most successful single of the album. "No Other" was to be the fourth and final single of the album. Although the song was never officially released as a single, it did receive radio airplay and a music video.

== Critical reception ==
Professional ratings
Aggregate scores
Source	Rating
Metacritic	67/100
Review scores
Source	Rating
AllMusic	4/5 stars
Artistdirect	2/5 stars
Daily News	4/5 stars
Entertainment Weekly	B
Rolling Stone	3/5 stars
Slant	3/5 stars
Spin	3.5/5 stars
USA Today	3/4 stars

A Different Me received generally positive reviews from music critics. At Metacritic, which assigns a normalized rating out of 100 to reviews from mainstream critics, the album has an average score of 67 based on 6 reviews, indicating "generally favorable reviews". Album of the Year collected 5 reviews and calculated an average of 71 out of 100.

Allmusic editor Andy Kellman called the album "Cole's most free-spirited and adventurous album to date," going on to say that there are "at least seven songs here that rate as highly as the best from the first two albums". Jim Farber of Daily News noted that "Cole's assertions of sweetness and light hardly prove as seamless, or simple, as her songs declare". He declared that "her makeover feels less like a day at the spa than a night at the shrink", going on to say that "instead of seeming harrowing or dark", the album's result is "soulful and fulfilling". Ken Capobiano from The Boston Globe said, "On her first two records, good grooves and great singing were matched by her healthy arrogance and fire. Here she's reining in some of the 'tude, and, along with her star producers, showing a sweeter and supremely sexy side [...] Cole emphatically dares to be different—and pretty great."

Entertainment Weekly's Mikael Wood wrote that "on A Different Me, this Oakland-born belter turns her focus from heartbreak to happiness only a few years after Blige promised she was done with drama. Fortunately, Cole still sounds plenty intense singing about finding a guy who completes her; in her experience-ravaged vocals you can hear relief, but also the knowledge that stability has a way of attracting trouble." USA Today writer Steve Jones found that Cole "is in a sexier, more playful mood on her third album. Her songs still wring the emotion, but there is much less pain than on previous works [...] It seems the still-evolving singer just keeps getting better." Similarly, Barry Walters from Spin remarked that "despite her third full-length's title, Cole doesn't mess with the formula established on her previous platinum albums, and that's a blessing. Matching street beats to stringed-up balladry, she narrows the gap between classic and contemporary soul with lived-in love songs that sidestep filler [...] Cole maintains an assured autobiographical voice. Accentuating joy over pain to reflect her ascent from troubled beginnings, this is the rare upbeat R&B disc that still feels real." On the contrary, Jon Caramanica of The New York Times noted that Cole "let go of her doubt", going on to say that "it's missed."

== Commercial performance ==
The album debuted at number two on the US Billboard 200, selling 322,000 copies in its first week, giving Cole her best week sales. In its second week, A Different Me fell to number seven, selling further 127,000 copies. In its third and fourth week, it remained at number seven, selling 54,000 and 37,000 copies, respectively. In its fifth week, the album fell to number nine, selling 31,000 copies. In its sixth week, the album climbed to number six, selling 31,000 copies. In its seventh week, A Different Me fell to number eight, selling 31,000 copies. In its eighth week, the album fell to number ten. The album sold over 1,000,000 copies in the US and has been certified platinum by the Recording Industry Association of America (RIAA).

== Track listing ==
Credits adapted from the liner notes of A Different Me.

No.	Title	Writer(s)	Producer(s)	Length
1.	"A Different Me" (Intro)	Keyshia Cole; Ramon Owen	Reo	1:47
2.	"Make Me Over"	Cole; Ester Dean; Polow da Don; Ike Turner; Tina Turner	Polow da Don; Ron Fair	3:05
3.	"Please Don't Stop"	Cole; Andrew Harr; Jermaine Jackson; Fair	The Runners; Fair	4:04
4.	"Erotic"	Cole; Theron Feemster; Fair	Feemster; Fair^{[A]}	4:10
5.	"You Complete Me"	Cole; Feemster	Feemster; Fair^{[A]}	3:51
6.	"No Other" (featuring Amina Harris)	Cole; Kwamé; James Poyser; Josh "Guido" Rivera; Harris	Kwamé; Fair^{[A]}	3:34
7.	"Oh-Oh, Yeah-Yea" (featuring Nas)	Cole; Nasir Jones; Nikesha Briscoe; Rafael Akinyemi	The Outsyders	3:58
8.	"Playa Cardz Right" (featuring 2Pac)	Cole; Tupac Shakur; Johnny Jackson; Carvin Haggins; Ivan Barias; Yafeu Fula; Tyruss Himes; Maurice Harding	Carvin & Ivan; Fair	4:51
9.	"Brand New"	Cole; D'ana Lewis; David Foreman, Jr.	Fair^{[A]}	4:16
10.	"Trust" (with Monica)	Cole; Frederick Taylor	Toxic; Donald Alford; Fair	4:13
11.	"Thought You Should Know"	Cole; Lonny Bereal; Thai Jones	Tank; Fair	4:18
12.	"This Is Us"	Evan Bogart; Victoria Hort; Jason T. Miller	Miller; Fair	3:16
13.	"Where This Love Could End Up"	Cole; Jean-Claude Oliver; Samuel Barnes; Russell Gonzalez	Poke & Tone; The ARE	2:55
14.	"Beautiful Music"	Cole; Oliver; Barnes; Alexander Mosely	Poke & Tone; Spanador	3:59
15.	"A Different Me" (Outro)	Cole; Owen	Reo	1:31

iTunes Store bonus tracks
No.	Title	Writer(s)	Producer(s)	Length
16.	"Playa Cardz Right" (No Rap Version)	Cole; Shakur; J. Jackson; Haggins; Barias; Fula; Himes; Harding	Carvin & Ivan; Fair	3:57
17.	"I Love You (Part 3)" (featuring Lil Wayne)	Isaac Hayes; Mary J. Blige; Sean Combs	Carvin & Ivan; Fair	4:23

Notes and sample credits

- ^{^[A]} denotes additional producer
- "Make Me Over" contains an interpolation of "Tina's Wish" as written by Ike & Tina Turner.

== Personnel ==
- "Toxic" Donald Alford – music producer (Track 10)
- Ivan "Orthodox" Barias – record producer (Track 8), all other instruments (8)
- Keyshia Cole – executive producer, vocal arrangement (Tracks 1–4, 6–7, 9–12, 14–15), A&R, vocal producer 1–4, 6–7, 9–12, 14–15)
- Claudio Cueni – 2Pac original vocal recording engineer (Track 8)
- Esther Dean – vocal arrangement, vocal producer (Track 2)
- Bojan Dugich – recording engineer (Track 13–14)
- Mike "Angry" Eleopoulos – recording engineer (All Tracks)
- Eric Eylands – audio mixing assistant (Track 10)
- Ron Fair – organ (Track 2), harmonica (5–6, 8–12, 14), horn conductor (2, 7, 13), producer (2–6, 8–11, 14), vibraphone (5, 8–9, 11), executive producer, vocal arrangement (1–4, 6, 9–12, 14–15), horn arrangements (2, 7, 13), string arrangements (3–6, 8–14), vocal producer (1–4, 6, 9–12, 14–15), string conductor (3–6, 8–14)
- Ron Feemster – drums (Track 5), additional keyboards (5), music producer (4–5), additional instruments (4–5)
- Bernie Grundman – mastering
- Josh Gudwin – recording engineer (Track 2)
- Carvin "Ransum" Haggins – record producer (Track 8)
- Manny Halley – executive producer, A&R, management
- Tal Herzberg – recording engineer (Track 2), Pro-Tools music editing (Tracks 1–5, 7–12, 14–15)
- Dan Higgins – flute (Track 14)
- Nate Hill – assistant recording engineer (Track 2)
- Buffy Hubelbank – production coordination (All Tracks)
- Chris James – recording engineer (Track 4)
- Johnny "J" – original 2Pac vocal recording producer (Track 8)
- Ryan Kennedy – assistant recording engineer (Tracks 2–3, 9, 11)
- Kid Named Cus – recording engineer (Track 6)
- Jonathan Merritt – audio mixing assistant (All Tracks)
- Jason T. Miller – producer (Track 12), guitar, synths
- Peter Mokran – audio mixing (Tracks 2–3, 6, 8, 10–12)
- James Murray – recording engineer (Track 5)
- Vek Neal – illustrations
- Outsyders – music producer, recording engineer (Track 7)
- Carlos Oyanedel – audio mixing assistant (Tracks 1, 4, 15)
- Dave Pensado – audio mixing (Tracks 5, 9, 13)
- Jason Perry – drums (Track 2)
- Poke & Tone – music producer (Tracks 13–14)
- Polow da Don – music producer (Track 2)
- James Poyser – additional music producer (Track 6)
- David "DQ" Quinones – recording engineer (Track 12)
- David "Davix" Foreman;- vocal production (Track 9)
- Josh "Guido" Rivera – guitar (Track 6)
- Mike Ruiz – photography
- The Runners – music producer, recording engineer (Track 3)
- Allen Sides – string recording engineer (Tracks 5–6, 8, 10, 14)
- Johnnie "Smurf" Smith – keyboards (Track 8)
- Phil Tan – audio mixing (Tracks 1, 4, 15)
- Tank – music producer (Track 11)
- Eric Weaver – audio mixing assistant (Tracks 2–3, 6, 8, 11)
- Frank Wolf – string recording engineer (Track 3, 9, 11–13)
- Andrew Wuepper – audio mixing assistant (Tracks 7, 9)

== Charts ==
=== Weekly charts ===
Chart (2008–09)	Peak position
Japanese Albums (Oricon)	62
US Billboard 200	2
US Indie Store Album Sales (Billboard)	1
US Top R&B/Hip-Hop Albums (Billboard)	1

=== Year-end charts ===
Chart (2009)	Position
US Billboard 200	20
US Top R&B/Hip Hop Albums (Billboard)	3

== Certifications ==
Region	Certification	Certified units/sales
United States (RIAA)	Platinum	1,000,000^{^}
^{^} Shipments figures based on certification alone.
