= A Different Me Tour =

2009 concert tour by Keyshia Cole

- Tour by Keyshia Cole
- Location: North America
- Associated album: A Different Me
- Start date: May 13, 2009
- End date: June 21, 2009
- Legs: 1
- No. of shows: 23

Keyshia Cole concert chronology
- I Am Music Tour (supporting act; 2008–2009); A Different Me Tour (2009); Love Letter Tour (opening act for R. Kelly; 2011)

The A Different Me Tour was a concert tour by American singer Keyshia Cole in support of her third studio album, A Different Me (2008). The tour began in Cincinnati on May 13, 2009, and concluded in Oakland, California, on June 21. The North American tour featured supporting performances by The-Dream, Keri Hilson, and Bobby V.

== Background and development ==
The tour was announced on April 21, 2009, as a 20-city United States concert run. The original announcement named Keri Hilson, Bobby Valentino, and The-Dream as featured performers. The tour supported Cole's third studio album, A Different Me, which was released in December 2008. The album debuted at number two on the Billboard 200 and received a gold certification from the Recording Industry Association of America three months after its release. In an interview with The Atlanta Journal-Constitution ahead of the Atlanta concert, Cole described the tour as a significant step in her career. She expressed enthusiasm about the production and called it "my next step up, my first theater run." The publication reported that the itinerary had expanded to 23 cities. Cole also spoke about her appreciation for performing live and connecting with audiences. In an April 2009 interview, she explained, "Singing directly to them is the most intimate thing I can do."

== Critical reception ==
Reviewing the May 14 performance at the Milwaukee Theatre, Evan Rytlewski of Shepherd Express characterized the show as an "aerobic, high-production concert". He observed that much of the set focused on songs about romantic difficulties, describing them as "countless similarly tense, tear-soaked numbers about romantic strife". Rytlewski also reviewed the supporting performances, discussing The-Dream's material and Keri Hilson's stage presence, as well as Bobby Valentino's opening performance.

Mikael Wood of the Los Angeles Times reviewed Cole's June 18 performance at the Nokia Theatre L.A. Live. He highlighted the concert's theatrical staging, which featured a recreated urban street setting with a pay phone, bus-stop bench, and simulated fires. Wood noted that the presentation encouraged audience participation, particularly during older songs such as "I Changed My Mind" and "I Should Have Cheated". He observed that the audience sometimes sang so loudly that it was "sometimes easier to hear the fans singing along with Cole than to hear the performer herself".

The Los Angeles performance also featured several guest appearances. Nas performed his verse on "Oh-Oh, Yeah-Yea", while Lil' Kim joined Cole for "Let It Go". Too Short, Monica, and Sean Combs also appeared during the concert. During the show, Cole received a plaque commemorating the platinum sales of her first three albums. Geffen Records executive Ron Fair praised her accomplishments, saying, "Keyshia is living proof that if you have a dream, it can be done."

Gabe Meline of the North Bay Bohemian reviewed the June 21 concert at the Paramount Theatre in Oakland. He described Cole's performance as featuring "nonstop choreography", "three wardrobe changes", elaborate stage arrangements, and "gymnastic vocals". However, he felt that the production could not compensate for the album's material, writing that "hard work alone is just that".

The Oakland performance also featured guest appearances by Lil' Kim and Too Short. Meline noted the audience's enthusiastic reaction to Lil' Kim's appearance during "Let It Go" and described The-Dream's performance as "electrifying to watch".

== Opening acts ==
- The-Dream
- Keri Hilson
- Bobby V (billed as Bobby Valentino)

== Set list ==
1. "I Changed My Mind"
2. "Oh-Oh, Yeah-Yea"
3. "I Should've Cheated"
4. "Give Me More"
5. "I Remember"
6. "Let It Go"
7. "Didn't I Tell You"
8. "Got to Get My Heart Back"
9. "Shoulda Let You Go"
10. "Get Money" (Junior M.A.F.I.A. cover)
11. "Last Night" (Diddy cover)
12. "Heaven Sent"
13. "Love"
14. "Sweet Thing" (performed by background singers; Rufus and Chaka Khan cover)
15. "Ain't Nobody" (performed by background singers; Rufus and Chaka Khan cover)
16. "A Different Me" (intro)
17. "Please Don't Stop"
18. "You Complete Me"
19. "Trust"
20. "Playa Cardz Right"

Encore

1. "Make Me Over"

== Tour dates ==
The tour's initial routing was published in April 2009, with additional listings documenting performances throughout May and June.

Date	City	Country	Venue
North America
May 13, 2009	Cincinnati	United States	Aronoff Center
May 14, 2009	Milwaukee	United States	Milwaukee Theatre
May 15, 2009	Chicago	United States	Chicago Theatre
May 16, 2009	Detroit	United States	Fox Theatre
May 21, 2009	Atlanta	United States	Fox Theatre
May 22, 2009	Greensboro	United States	Greensboro Coliseum Complex
May 23, 2009	Atlantic City	United States	Trump Taj Mahal
May 24, 2009	New York City	United States	Madison Square Garden (WaMu Theater)
May 28, 2009	Washington, D.C.	United States	DAR Constitution Hall
May 29, 2009	Richmond	United States	Landmark Theater
May 30, 2009	Portsmouth	United States	Portsmouth Pavilion
May 31, 2009	Columbia	United States	Township Auditorium
June 3, 2009	Cleveland	United States	State Theatre
June 5, 2009	Mashantucket	United States	MGM Grand at Foxwoods
June 6, 2009	Baltimore	United States	Pier Six Pavilion
June 9, 2009	Nashville	United States	Ryman Auditorium
June 11, 2009	St. Louis	United States	Fabulous Fox Theatre
June 15, 2009	Southaven	United States	DeSoto Civic Center
June 13, 2009	Grand Prairie	United States	Nokia Theatre at Grand Prairie
June 14, 2009	Houston	United States	Reliant Arena at Reliant Park
June 18, 2009	Los Angeles	United States	Nokia Theatre L.A. Live
June 19, 2009	San Diego	United States	Humphrey's Concerts by the Bay
June 21, 2009	Oakland	United States	Paramount Theatre

=== Reschedules and cancellations ===
The Southaven performance was moved from its originally scheduled date of June 12 to June 15. Archived concert listings document the June 15 engagement at the DeSoto Civic Center.
