= Playa Cardz Right =

Single by Keyshia Cole featuring 2Pac

from the album A Different Me and Pac's Life
- Released: October 7, 2008
- Recorded: January 10, 1996 (2Pac's vocals); 2006 (Production and mixing)
- Genre: R&B; hip hop
- Length: 4:53
- Label: Geffen
- Songwriters: Keon Bryce; Maurice Harding; Tyruss Himes; Yafeu Fula; Christopher Bridges; Michael J. Clervoix; Johnny Jackson; Tupac Shakur
- Producers: Ron Fair; Carvin & Ivan

Keyshia Cole singles chronology
"Game's Pain" (2008)	"Playa Cardz Right" (2008)	"You Complete Me" (2009)

2Pac singles chronology
"Pac's Life" (2006)	"Playa Cardz Right" (2008)

"Playa Cardz Right" is a song by American R&B recording artist Keyshia Cole. The song features late rapper 2Pac and was originally included on his sixth posthumously released album Pac's Life (2006), with most of his vocals initially recorded for his fourth studio album All Eyez on Me (1996). Cole's reworked version, produced by Ron Fair and Carvin & Ivan for Karma Productions, was released as the lead single from her third album A Different Me (2008).

The music video premiered on BET's Access Granted on October 30, 2008.

== Original version and remixes ==
The song was originally produced by Johnny J and features Hurt-M-Badd, Big Syke, Mopreme Shakur, Yaki Kadafi & E.D.I. It can be found on numerous 2Pac mixtapes. It can also be found on Mopreme Shakur's mixtape Evolution Of A Thug Life N.I.G.G.A. Vol. 1.1., omitting Yaki Kadafi & E.D.I.'s verses. There is another version of the original version that leaked online & mixtapes, that version replaces Hurt-M-Badd with singer Michel'le.

There is a remix that features 2Pac's late friend & Outlawz member Hussein Fatal with Keyshia Cole & 2Pac. As a part of an iTunes download for Cole's album A Different Me, a no-rap version was released as a bonus track. Omitting 2Pac's vocals, it featured a new lead verse by Cole.

The Original recording of the song contains an uncleared sample of "If you play your cards right" by Alicia Myers. The title "Playa Cardz Right" is a take on the original song's title.

== Charts ==
=== Weekly charts ===
Chart (2008–09)	Peak position
Japan (Japan Hot 100)	55
US Billboard Hot 100	63
US Adult R&B Songs (Billboard)	11
US Hot R&B/Hip-Hop Songs (Billboard)	9

=== Year-end charts ===
Chart (2009)	Position
US Hot R&B/Hip-Hop Songs (Billboard)	45
