= Keyshia & Daniel: Family First =

- Title card
- Genre: Reality
- Developed by: James DuBose
- Starring: Keyshia Cole; Daniel Gibson; Daniel Gibson, Jr. Frankie Lons; Dr. Yvonne Cole
- Country of origin: United States
- Original language: English
- No. of seasons: 1
- No. of episodes: 8

Production
- Executive producers: Daniel Gibson; James DuBose; Keyshia Cole; Michele Barnwell
- Producer: James DuBose
- Production company: DuBose Entertainment

Original release
- Network: BET
- Release: October 9 – December 4, 2012

Related
- Keyshia Cole: The Way It Is; Keyshia Cole: All In

Keyshia & Daniel: Family First is an American reality television series starring Grammy-nominated R&B singer Keyshia Cole. The series premiered on October 9, 2012 on BET, and ended its run on December 4, 2012.

== Premise ==
The show revolves around the family life of Keyshia Cole and her husband, Daniel Gibson, and her work as a singer-songwriter and businesswoman as she crafts her fifth studio album, Woman to Woman. All the episodes were titled after the songs from her different albums.

== Episodes ==
No.	Title	Original release date	U.S. viewers (millions)
1	"Heaven Sent"	October 9, 2012	2.92
2	"Love"	October 16, 2012	0.80
3	"I Ain't Thru"	October 23, 2012	1.05
4	"Thought You Had My Back"	October 30, 2012	1.19
5	"2 Sides to Everything"	November 13, 2012	1.03
6	"Where This Love Could End Up"	November 20, 2012	1.31
7	"Work It Out"	November 27, 2012	1.30
8	"Trust and Believe"	December 4, 2012	0.98
