= You Complete Me (song) =

Single by Keyshia Cole

from the album A Different Me
- Released: January 20, 2009
- Recorded: 2007–2008
- Genre: R&B, soul
- Length: 3:51
- Label: Geffen
- Songwriters: Keyshia Cole, Theron Feemster
- Producers: Ron Fair, Ron "NEFF-U" Feemstar

Keyshia Cole singles chronology
"Playa Cardz Right" (2008)	"You Complete Me" (2009)	"Trust" (2009)

"You Complete Me" is R&B song by American singer-songwriter Keyshia Cole. It is the second single from Keyshia Cole's third studio album A Different Me. Its music video ranked at No. 21 on BET's Notarized: Top 100 Videos of 2009 countdown.

== Chart performance ==
"You Complete Me" charted on the U.S. Billboard Hot R&B/Hip-Hop Songs and has so far peaked at number 7. It also peaked on the U.S. Billboard Hot 100 at number 62. The song has become a bigger hit than the previous single, the song became her fifteenth chart entry on the Hot 100 chart and her ninth consecutive top ten hit on the Hot R&B/Hip-Hop Songs chart.

== Charts ==
=== Weekly charts ===
Chart (2009)	Peak position
US Billboard Hot 100	62
US Adult R&B Songs (Billboard)	18
US Hot R&B/Hip-Hop Songs (Billboard)	7

=== Year-end charts ===
Chart (2009)	Position
US Hot R&B/Hip-Hop Songs (Billboard)	35
