= Trust (Keyshia Cole and Monica song) =

Single by Keyshia Cole and Monica

from the album A Different Me
- Released: April 21, 2009
- Genre: R&B, soul
- Length: 4:26 (solo version); 4:13 (duet album version)
- Label: Geffen
- Songwriters: Donald Alford; Keyshia Cole; Frederick Taylor
- Producers: Toxic, Ron Fair

Keyshia Cole singles chronology
"You Complete Me" (2009)	"Trust" (2009)	"I Ain't Thru" (2010)

Monica singles chronology
"Hell No (Leave Home)" (2007)	"Trust" (2009)	"Everything to Me" (2010)

"Trust" is a song by American singer Keyshia Cole. It was written by Cole and Frederick Taylor and co-produced by Donald "Toxic" Alford and Ron Fair for her third studio album, A Different Me (2008). It is a re-recording of the iTunes pre-order bonus song from Cole's previous album Just like You.

In 2008, the ballad was re-recorded as a duet with fellow R&B singer Monica, replacing parts of Cole's original vocals with hers, and was included on Cole's third studio album A Different Me (2008). It was released as the album's third single on April 21, 2009, with its music video world premiering on May 4, 2009, in time for Mother's Day. The song became Monica's sixteenth chart entry on the Hot 100, also becoming Cole's highest-peaking single from the album.

The accompanying music video for "Trust", directed by Chris Robinson, was ranked at 15th on BET's Notarized: Top 100 Videos of 2009 countdown. It also peaked on top on BET's 106 & Park.

== Track listing ==
US promo single

1. "Trust" (no intro, radio edit) – 3:26
2. "Trust" (with intro, radio edit) – 3:46
3. "Trust" (album version) – 4:16

== Charts ==
=== Weekly charts ===
Weekly chart performance for "Trust"
Chart (2009)	Peak position
Netherlands Urban (MegaCharts)	25
New Zealand Urban Radio (RMNZ)	40
US Billboard Hot 100	70
US Hot R&B/Hip-Hop Songs (Billboard)	5

=== Year-end charts ===
Year-end chart performance for "Trust"
Chart (2009)	Position
US Hot R&B/Hip-Hop Songs (Billboard)	21
