= Point of No Return Tour =

2014 concert tour by Keyshia Cole

- Tour by Keyshia Cole
- Associated album: Point of No Return
- Start date: July 20, 2014
- End date: August 30, 2014
- Legs: 1
- No. of shows: 22
- Supporting act: Adrian Marcel

Keyshia Cole concert chronology
- Woman to Woman Tour (2013); Point of No Return Tour (2014); Love Hard Tour (2024)

The Point of No Return Tour was a concert tour by American singer Keyshia Cole in support of her sixth studio album, Point of No Return (2014). The tour began on July 20, 2014, at Myth Live in Minneapolis, and concluded on August 30 at the Celebrity Theatre in Phoenix, Arizona. It comprised 22 performances across the United States, with singer Adrian Marcel as the opening act.

== Background ==
Cole announced the Point of No Return Tour in June 2014, ahead of the release of her album of the same name. The album followed Woman to Woman (2012). Adrian Marcel was announced as the tour's supporting act. The Oakland-based singer was signed to Republic Records and had released his debut mixtape, 7 Days of Weak, in 2013.

The tour opened on July 20 at Myth Live in Minneapolis. Its itinerary included venues in several major American cities, including Saint Andrew's Hall in Detroit, Irving Plaza in New York City, the Tabernacle in Atlanta, the Wiltern in Los Angeles, and the Fillmore in San Francisco. The final performance took place at the Celebrity Theatre in Phoenix on August 30.

=== Promotional appearances ===
Three performances were listed in promotional material ahead of the tour's official opening: July 12 in Rochester, New York, July 18 in Bossier City, Louisiana, and July 19 in Gulfport, Mississippi. These appearances preceded the July 20 opening date and are listed separately from the tour itinerary.

Date	City	Venue
July 12, 2014	Rochester	Blue Cross Arena
July 18, 2014	Bossier City	CenturyLink Center
July 19, 2014	Gulfport	Club Illusion

== Critical reception ==
Cole's July 22, 2014, performance at Saint Andrew's Hall in Detroit was covered by The Macomb Daily and The Oakland Press. Liz Ramanand reviewed Cole's July 29 performance at Irving Plaza in New York City for The Boombox. The set included songs from Point of No Return, including "Intro (Last Tango)", "Heat of Passion", "Rick James", and "She", as well as material from her earlier releases. Ramanand described Cole's performance positively and reported an enthusiastic audience response.

== Tour dates ==
Date	City	Venue
July 20, 2014	Minneapolis	Myth Live
July 22, 2014	Detroit	Saint Andrew's Hall
July 24, 2014	Chicago	House of Blues
July 26, 2014	Cincinnati	Macy's Fest
July 27, 2014	Cleveland	House of Blues
July 29, 2014	New York City	Irving Plaza
August 1, 2014	Philadelphia	Theatre of Living Arts
August 2, 2014	Boston	House of Blues
August 3, 2014	Silver Spring	Fillmore Silver Spring
August 7, 2014	Charlotte	Fillmore Charlotte
August 8, 2014	Durham	DPAC Depot
August 9, 2014	North Myrtle Beach	House of Blues
August 10, 2014	Atlanta	Tabernacle
August 11, 2014	Orlando	House of Blues
August 13, 2014	New Orleans	House of Blues
August 15, 2014	Houston	House of Blues
August 17, 2014	Dallas	House of Blues
August 21, 2014	Anaheim	House of Blues
August 22, 2014	Los Angeles	The Wiltern
August 23, 2014	San Francisco	The Fillmore
August 25, 2014	San Diego	House of Blues
August 30, 2014	Phoenix	Celebrity Theatre
