= Point of No Return (Keyshia Cole album) =

Studio album by Keyshia Cole
- Released: October 7, 2014
- Recorded: 2012–2014
- Genres: R&B; hip-hop soul
- Length: 42:28
- Label: Interscope
- Producers: Tim Kelley; Seige Monstracity; Mike Will Made It; DJ Mustard; Donut; Amadeus; Stargate; Troy Taylor; Patrick Hayes; Marz; 1st Born; Printz Board; Boogie; M-Phazes; Symbolyc One; Jon Jon Traxx; No Credit; Donut; Chink Santana

Keyshia Cole chronology
Woman to Woman (2012)	Point of No Return (2014)	11:11 Reset (2017)

Singles from Point of No Return
- 1. "Next Time (Won't Give My Heart Away)" Released: March 31, 2014; 2. "Rick James" Released: March 31, 2014; 3. "She" Released: June 23, 2014

Professional ratings
Review scores
Source	Rating
AllMusic	2.5/5 stars
Robert Christgau	(2-star Honorable Mention)

Point of No Return is the sixth studio album by American singer Keyshia Cole; it was released on October 7, 2014, by Interscope Records and Universal Music Group and served as Cole's final album with the label. The album features production from various music producers including Tim Kelley of Tim & Bob, Mike Will Made It, DJ Mustard, WillieDonut, Amadeus, Stargate and features guest appearances by 2 Chainz, Juicy J, Gavyn Rhone, Wale, August Alsina, Faith Evans and Future.

== Background ==
In August 2013, it was reported that songwriter Elijah Blake started working with Cole on her sixth studio album. During the composition of the album, Cole collaborated with artists Juicy J, Future, Wale, Mike Will Made It, Birdman, and R. Kelly. The album marks Cole's last release with Interscope Records. The album's release was set to coincide with the premiere of her reality show Keyshia Cole: All In on BET. Instead, the show premiered in February 2015.

== Singles ==
On March 15, 2014, Cole took to Instagram to play snippets from her upcoming album. Along the snippets was club banger, "Rick James" (featuring Juicy J). The single premiered on Power 105's morning show, The Breakfast Club, but it was released on digital retailers three months later on June 3, later than "Next Time (Won't Give My Heart Away)" thus becoming the second single, despite having earlier premiere.

On March 20, 2014, Cole's single "Next Time (Won't Give My Heart Away)" was released on her SoundCloud and officially impacted US Rhythmic radio on April 1. The single was released on iTunes on March 31, 2014, thus becoming the first digital single of the project. The music videos for both of the songs were released in April.

In July 2014, the third single "She" produced by DJ Mustard was released.

She released a promotional single "I Remember (Part 2)" on September 23, 2014. It is the sequel to her single "I Remember". The music video was released on October 21, 2014.

=== Other songs ===
Despite not being released as singles, Cole appeared on 106 & Park and premiered seven music videos in October 2014: "N.L.U" (featuring 2 Chainz) (October 3, 2014), "Believer" (October 7, 2014), "Love Letter" (featuring Future) (October 8, 2014), "Intro (Last Tango)" (October 9, 2014), "Party Ain't a Party" (featuring Gavin Rhone) (October 10, 2014), "Heat of Passion" (October 13, 2014), She released a further two in January 2015: "Do That For (B.A.B)" (January 6, 2015) and "New Nu" (January 6, 2015).

== Commercial performance ==
The album debuted at number 9 on the US Billboard 200 chart, selling nearly 26,000 copies during its first week.

== Track listing ==
Point of No Return track listing
No.	Title	Writer(s)	Producer(s)	Length
1.	"Intro (Last Tango)"	Keyshia Cole; Tim Kelley; Marcus White	Kelley; Seige Monstracity	2:54
2.	"Heat of Passion"	Cole; Antwan Thompson; Jerrol "Boogie" Wizzard; Troy Taylor	Amadeus; Wizzard; Taylor	4:00
3.	"N.L.U" (featuring 2 Chainz)	Cole; Sean Fenton; Tauheed Epps; Larry Griffin, Jr.; Mark Landon; Robert Kelly	S1; M-Phazes	4:14
4.	"Next Time (Won't Give My Heart Away)"	Cole; Thompson; Wizzard	Amadeus; Wizzard	3:34
5.	"Rick James" (featuring Juicy J)	Cole; Breana Marin; Fenton; Jordan Houston; Roahn Hylton; Brandon Bell; Taylor Parks; Kam Parker	1st Born; Donut	4:11
6.	"New Nu"	Cole; Michael Williams; Marquel Middlebrooks; Nayvadius Wilburn; Timothy Thomas; Theron Thomas	Mike Will Made It; Marz	2:57
7.	"She"	Cole; Fenton; Kirby Dockery; Dijon McFarlane; Printz Board	DJ Mustard; Board	3:46
8.	"Believer"	Ester Dean; Jasper Cameron; M.S. Eriksen; T.E. Hermansen	Stargate	3:34
9.	"Love Letter" (featuring Future)	Cole; Wilburn; Williams; Middlebrooks	Mike Will Made It; Marz	3:34
10.	"Party Ain't a Party" (featuring Gavyn Rhone)	Cole; Patrick Hayes; Tenisha Younger	Hayes	4:51
11.	"Remember (Part 2)"	Cole; Hayes; Younger	Hayes	4:59
Total length:				42:32

Deluxe edition
No.	Title	Writer(s)	Producer(s)	Length
12.	"Do That For (B.A.B.)"	Cole; Andre Parker; Imani Halley	Chink Santana	3:52
13.	"On Demand" (featuring Wale and August Alsina)	Cole; Olubowale Akintimehin; John Webb, Jr.; Kevin Spencer; Donald Earle DeGrate; Cedric Hailey	Jon Jon Traxx; No Credit	4:02
Total length:				50:21

Target deluxe edition bonus track
No.	Title	Writer(s)	Producer(s)	Length
14.	"No Complications"	Brandon Bell; Jdoe; Marin	Donut; 1st Born	3:30
Total length:				53:51

== Charts ==
=== Weekly charts ===
Chart (2014)	Peak position
US Billboard 200	9
US Top R&B/Hip-Hop Albums (Billboard)	1
US Top R&B Albums (Billboard)	1

=== Year-end charts ===
Chart (2014)	Position
US Top R&B/Hip-Hop Albums (Billboard)	65

== See also ==
- List of Billboard number-one R&B/hip-hop albums of 2014
