= Beacon Theatre =

Beacon Theatre may refer to:

- Beacon Theatre (New York City)
- Beacon Theatre (Beacon, New York)
- Beacon Theatre (Boston)
- Beacon Theatre (Hopewell, Virginia)
- a longtime former name of the Pantages Theatre (Vancouver)

== See also ==
- Beacon Theatre: Live from New York, album by Joe Bonamassa
- Beacon Theatres, Inc. v. Westover, a U.S. Supreme Court case decided in 1959
