= KISS (brand) =

Japanese brand of adult video games

- Product type: Adult video games
- Current owner: Workman Co., Ltd.
- Country: Japan
- Introduced: 1998; 28 years ago
- Website: kisskiss.tv

KISS (Japanese: キス) is a brand of adult (or eroge) PC games developed by Japanese company Workman Co., Ltd., from Ikebukuro. In 2013, Kiss developed a virtual reality add-on for Custom Maid 3D with a wireless male masturbation device called Ju-C Air, making it the first sex game with Oculus Rift support. Moving forward, their developments have brought some attention to the VR era of adult games, with a VR and live event celebrating their 20th anniversary on their 2018 title, Custom Order Maid 3D 2.

== Overview ==
The Kiss brand of adult games is characterized by a female character creation feature called "Heroine Edit System" which allows fine-tuning of the character's hairstyle, body shape, personality and costume; coupled with a training/nurturing system where the player teaches the character how to perform specific tasks.

Kiss was originally started as a brand of J & H Co., Ltd. in 1998. After their debut game release of "Custom Slave" and "Custom Slave+" in 1999, their website was shut down and the company was dissolved. In 2003, the brand was transferred to the present company, Workman Co., Ltd who proceeded to work on "Custom Slave II" and continuing titles up to the present.

In 2009, Kiss became a sub-brand of Reactor, which is another brand created by Workman Co., Ltd. to consolidate all of their adult game brands.

== Releases ==
- Custom Slave (カスタム隷奴) (January 21, 1999)
  - Custom Slave+ (November 26, 1999)
- Custom Slave II (February 7, 2003)
  - Custom Slave II+ (June 27, 2003)
  - Custom Slave II DVD (January 30, 2004)
- Omoi, Tokihanatareta Toki ("Thoughts, When Unleashed", November 26, 2004)
- Custom Slave III (September 22, 2005)
  - Custom Slave III Plus (December 22, 2005)
  - Custom Slave III Special Edition (March 24, 2006)
- Custom Slave F (September 29, 2006)
  - Custom Slave F Plus (December 29, 2006)
  - Custom Slave F Special Edition (March 23, 2007)
- XX na Kanojo no Tsukuri Kata ("XX Way of Making a Girlfriend", November 22, 2007)
  - XX na Kanojo no Tsukuri Kata Happening (May 23, 2008)
  - XX na Kanojo no Tsukuri Kata Happening PLUS DISC (May 23, 2008)
- Alter Ego (May 29, 2009)
- Custom Slave 4 (カスタムレイド4) (April 30, 2010)
  - Custom Slave 4+ (August 13, 2010)
  - Custom Slave 4 SM Set (August 27, 2010)
  - Custom Slave 4 2010 Summer Plugin DISC (September 24, 2010)
  - Custom Slave 4++ (November 26, 2010)
  - Custom Slave 4 2010 Winter Plugin DISC (February 25, 2011)
  - Custom Slave 4 SE (April 22, 2011)
- Custom Maid 3D (January 28, 2011)
  - Custom Maid 3D Visual Pack (April 28, 2011)
  - Custom Maid 3D Skill Pack (June 24, 2011)
  - Custom Maid 3D 2011 Summer Plugin DISC (October 28, 2011)
  - Custom Maid 3D Personality Pack (November 25, 2011)
  - Custom Maid 3D 2011 Winter Plugin DISC (January 27, 2012)
  - Custom Maid 3D Skill Pack 2 (March 23, 2012)
  - Custom Maid 3D 2012 Spring Plugin DISC (April 27, 2012)
  - Custom Maid 3D Voice Pack (June 29, 2012)
  - Custom Maid 3D 2012 Summer Plugin DISC (August 24, 2012)
  - Custom Maid 3D Season Pack 2013 (July 26, 2013)
  - Custom Maid 3D Premium Pack (August 30, 2013)
  - Custom Maid 3D Skill Pack 3 (December 20, 2013)
  - Custom Maid 3D Skill Pack 4 (April 25, 2014)
  - Custom Maid 3D Premium Pack 2 (August 29, 2014)
  - Custom Maid 3D Skill Pack 5 (November 28, 2014)
  - Custom Maid 3D with Chu-B Lip (June 26, 2015)
- Custom Slave V (カスタムレイドV) (June 24, 2011)
  - Custom Slave V Plus (September 22, 2011)
  - Custom Slave V SE (September 22, 2011)
  - Custom Slave V 2011 Summer Plugin DISC (October 28, 2011)
- XX na Kanojo no Tsukuri Kata 2 (May 27, 2012)
  - XX na Kanojo no Tsukuri Kata 2 Summer Plug-in DISC (August 24, 2012)
  - XX na Kanojo no Tsukuri Kata 2 Secret Date Pack (September 28, 2012)
  - XX na Kanojo no Tsukuri Kata 2 Network & Part-Time Job Pack (October 26, 2012)
  - XX na Kanojo no Tsukuri Kata 2 Personality Pack (November 30, 2012)
  - XX na Kanojo no Tsukuri Kata 2 Extra Date Pack (December 29, 2012)
  - XX na Kanojo no Tsukuri Kata 2 Premium Pack (January 31, 2014)
- Custom Maid Online (February 22, 2013)
  - Custom Maid Online Starter Pack (March 28, 2014)
  - Custom Maid Online Bourgeois Pack (March 28, 2014)
- Make Me Lover (July 25, 2014)
  - Make Me Lover Darkness (December 19, 2014)
  - Make Me Lover Darkness L Body Plus Pack (January 30, 2015)
  - Make Me Lover SpecialEdition (January 30, 2015)
- Custom Maid 3D 2 (July 24, 2015)
  - Custom Maid 3D 2 with Chu-B Lip (September 18, 2015)
  - Custom Maid 3D 2 Visual Pack (October 23, 2015)
  - Custom Maid 3D 2 with Chu-B Lip W Pack (December 25, 2015)
  - Wireless Fleshlight Controller "Chu-B Lip" (December 25, 2015)
  - Custom Maid 3D 2+ (January 29, 2016)
  - Custom Maid 3D 2 Character Pack Maternal Older Sister (April 28, 2016)
  - Custom Maid 3D 2+ ACT.2 (July 29, 2016)
  - Custom Maid 3D 2 Character Pack Healthy and Sporty Tomboy (October 28, 2016)
  - Custom Maid 3D 2+ ACT.3 (January 27, 2017)
  - Custom Maid 3D 2 Vacation Pack VR (April 28, 2017)
  - Custom Maid 3D 2 Character Pack She who Excites the Hearts of Masochists, The Sadist Queen (June 23, 2017)
  - Custom Maid 3D 2 Karaoke Pack VR (September 29, 2017)
  - Custom Maid 3D 2 Karaoke Pack VR VOL.2 (January 26, 2018)
- Custom Order Maid 3D 2 (February 23, 2018)
  - CUSTOM ORDER MAID 3D2 It's a Night Magic
