= Love Letter Tour =

2011 concert tour by R. Kelly

- Tour by R. Kelly
- Promotional poster for the tour
- Associated album: Love Letter
- Start date: April 17, 2011
- End date: July 14, 2011
- Legs: 2
- No. of shows: 10 in Europe; 24 in North America; 34 Total

R. Kelly concert chronology
- Ladies Make Some Noise Tour (2009); Love Letter Tour (2011); Single Ladies Tour (2012)

The Love Letter Tour was a summer tour headlined by R&B artist R. Kelly. It supported the album, Love Letter.

== Opening acts ==
- Keyshia Cole (North America)
- Marsha Ambrosius (North America)

== Setlist ==
This setlist was obtained from the concert held on June 30, 2011, at the Prudential Center in Newark, New Jersey. It does not represent all shows during the tour.

1. "Video Sequence"
2. "Step in the Name of Love" (Remix) / "Red Carpet (Pause, Flash)" / "Chocolate Factory"
3. "Love Letter"
4. "Number One Hit"
5. "Happy People"
6. "Freaky in the Club"
7. "So Sexy" / "Hotel" / "Thoia Thoing" / "Slow Wind"
8. "Strip for You"
9. "TP-2"
10. "Video Sequence"
11. "Home Alone" / "Gigolo" / "Snake" / "Use to Me Spending" / "I'm a Flirt"
12. "Ignition (Remix)"
13. "Fiesta" / "Number One" / "Friend of Mine" / "Feelin' On Yo Booty" / "Real Talk" / "Bump N' Grind" (Old School Remix)
14. "In the Kitchen" / "Slow Dance (Hey Mr. DJ)" / "12 Play"
15. "It Seems Like You're Ready"
16. "Your Body's Callin'"
17. "When a Woman's Fed Up"
18. "Down Low (Nobody Has to Know)"
19. "R&B Thug"
20. "Video Sequence"
21. "When a Woman Loves"
22. "Step in the Name of Love" (Reprise)
23. "My Way"

== Tour dates ==
Date	City	Country	Venue
Europe
April 17, 2011	Nuremberg	Germany	Planet
April 18, 2011	Zürich	Switzerland	X-tra
April 19, 2011	Amsterdam	Netherlands	Heineken Music Hall
April 22, 2011	Manchester	England	O_{2} Apollo
April 23, 2011	London	England	HMV Hammersmith Apollo
April 25, 2011	Berlin	Germany	Admiralspalast
April 26, 2011	Hamburg	Germany	Große Freiheit 36
April 27, 2011	Offenbach	Germany	Capitol
April 28, 2011	Cologne	Germany	Live Music Hall
April 30, 2011	Paris	France	Le Bataclan
North America
June 2, 2011	Southaven	United States	DeSoto Civic Center
June 3, 2011	New Orleans	United States	Lakefront Arena
June 4, 2011	Mobile	United States	Civic Center Arena
June 5, 2011	Houston	United States	Toyota Center
June 10, 2011	Oakland	United States	Oracle Arena
June 11, 2011	Los Angeles	United States	Nokia Theatre L.A. Live
June 16, 2011	Rosemont	United States	Allstate Arena
June 17, 2011	St. Louis	United States	Chaifetz Arena
June 18, 2011	Kansas City	United States	Sprint Center
June 19, 2011	Grand Prairie	United States	Verizon Theatre
June 23, 2011	Columbia	United States	Colonial Life Arena
June 24, 2011	Raleigh	United States	RBC Center
June 25, 2011	Atlanta	United States	Philips Arena
June 26, 2011	Birmingham	United States	BJCC Arena
June 29, 2011^{[A]}	Cleveland	United States	Wolstein Center
June 30, 2011	Newark	United States	Prudential Center
July 1, 2011	Baltimore	United States	1st Mariner Arena
July 2, 2011	Washington, D.C.	United States	Verizon Center
July 3, 2011	Philadelphia	United States	Mann Center for the Performing Arts
July 8, 2011	Columbus	United States	Value City Arena
July 9, 2011	Detroit	United States	Fox Theatre
July 10, 2011	Detroit	United States	Fox Theatre
July 13, 2011	Louisville	United States	KFC Yum! Center
July 14, 2011	Nashville	United States	Bridgestone Arena

Festivals and other miscellaneous performances
^{A} WZAK 30th Anniversary Celebration

Cancellations and rescheduled shows

June 14, 2011	Council Bluffs, Iowa	Mid-America Center	Cancelled
July 12, 2011	Richmond, Virginia	Landmark Theater	Cancelled
July 19, 2011	Savannah, Georgia	Martin Luther King Jr. Arena	Cancelled

=== Box office score data ===
Venue	City	Tickets sold / Available	Gross revenue
Oracle Arena	Oakland	5,131 / 6,535 (79%)	$384,678
Nokia Theatre L.A. Live	Los Angeles	13,764 / 13,764 (100%)	$950,547
Verizon Theatre	Grand Prairie	5,706 / 5,952 (96%)	$393,466
Philips Arena	Atlanta	11,024 / 11,024 (100%)	$699,821
Prudential Center	Newark	7,217 / 7,804 (92%)	$582,894
Verizon Center	Washington, D.C.	7,652 / 12,546 (61%)	$648,356
Mann Center for the Performing Arts	Philadelphia	6,947 / 7,421 (94%)	$473,216
Bridgestone Arena	Nashville	4,626 / 7,407 (86%)	$294,555
TOTAL		62,067 / 72,453 (86%)	$4,427,533
