= Daniel Gibson =

American basketball player (born 1986)

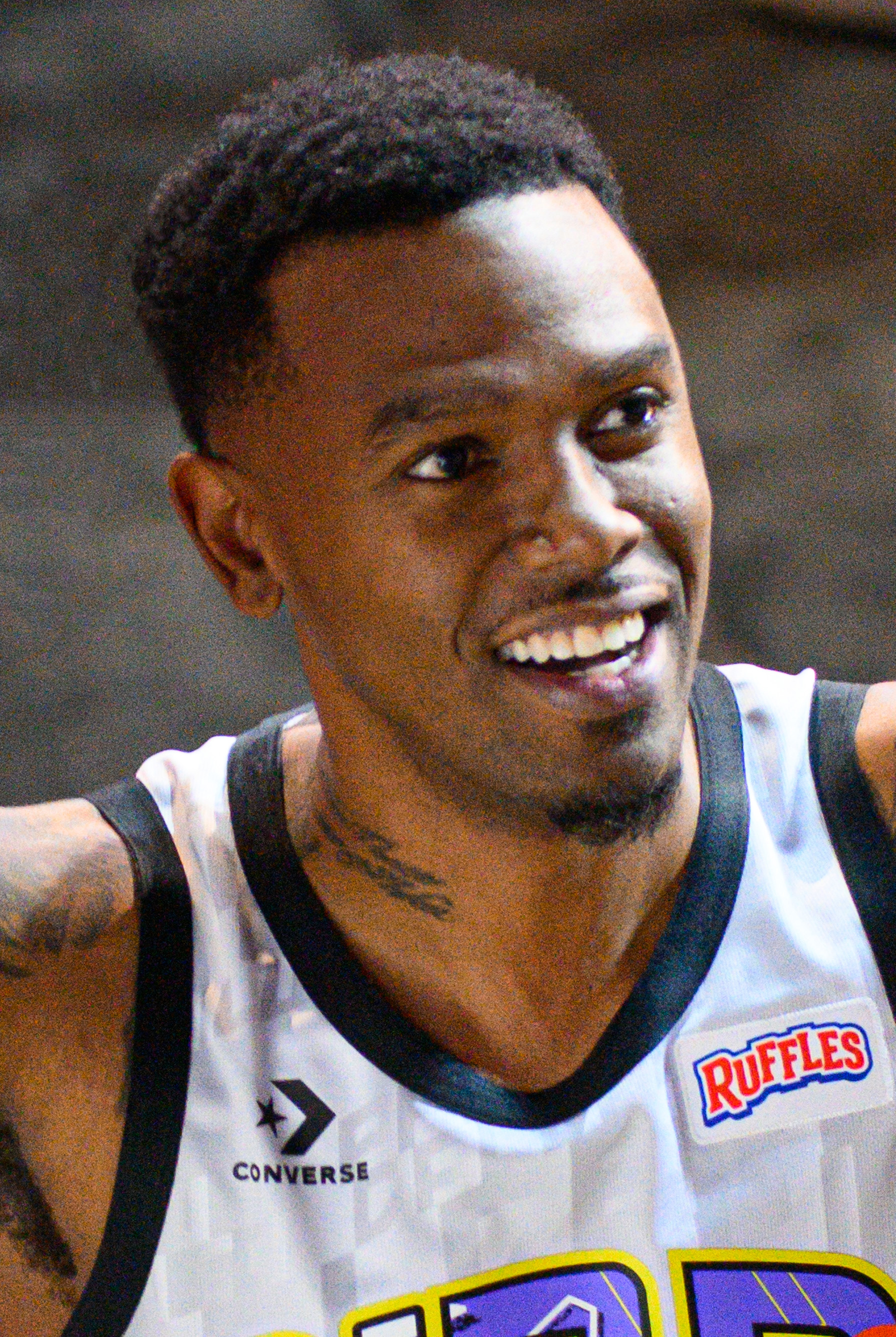
- Gibson in 2022

Personal information
- Born: February 27, 1986 (age 40) Houston, Texas, U.S.
- Listed height: 6 ft 2 in (1.88 m)
- Listed weight: 200 lb (91 kg)

Career information
- High school: Jones (Houston, Texas)
- College: Texas (2004–2006)
- NBA draft: 2006: 2nd round, 42nd overall pick
- Drafted by: Cleveland Cavaliers
- Playing career: 2006–2013
- Position: Point guard / shooting guard
- Number: 1

Career history
- 2006–2013: Cleveland Cavaliers

Career highlights
- Big 12 Freshman of the Year (2005); 2× Third-team All-Big 12 (2005, 2006); Big 12 All-Defensive Team – Media (2006); McDonald's All-American (2004); Second-team Parade All-American (2004); Fourth-team Parade All-American (2003)

Career statistics
- Points: 3,115 (7.8 ppg)
- Rebounds: 792 (2.0 rpg)
- Assists: 775 (2.0 apg)
- Stats at NBA.com
- Stats at Basketball Reference

Daniel Hiram "Boobie" Gibson (born February 27, 1986) is an American former professional basketball player. He was selected by the Cleveland Cavaliers in the second round of the 2006 NBA draft and played seven seasons for them.

== Early life ==
Gibson averaged 25.5 points per game and 9.3 assists per game while leading Jones High School in Houston, Texas to a 31–4 record and the Texas Class 4A state title as a senior. It marked the school's first state championship since 1965. Gibson graduated sixth out of 212 students in his high school class, and was a member of the National Honor Society.

== College career ==
Gibson starred as a guard in college basketball the University of Texas at Austin. In his two seasons with the Longhorns, he scored 935 points, including 175 three-point field goals. Gibson made 101 threes during the 2005–2006 season, including 9 of 12 against the Baylor Bears on January 21, 2006. It was one short of the Texas record of 10 set by Al Coleman against Kansas State in January 1997. He scored a personal-high 37 points in that same game.

Gibson played two seasons at Texas and averaged 13.8 points, 3.6 rebounds and 3.5 assists in 68 games (all starts). He was named Honorable Mention All-America by The Associated Press following his sophomore season. Gibson averaged 13.4 points, 3.6 rebounds and 3.1 assists per game as a sophomore. He earned First-Team NABC All-District 9 honors and was named All-Big 12 Third Team. He set a school record for most three-point field goals made in a season (101). He was one of 16 finalists for the Bob Cousy Award, given to the nation's top point guard. He sank at least four three-pointers in a game on 10 occasions. Gibson was named the Big 12 Freshman of the Year after his first season, averaging 14.2 points, 3.6 rebounds and 3.9 assists per game. He was also named All-Big 12 Third Team and became the first freshman in school history to lead Texas in scoring. On June 7, 2006, Gibson announced his decision to forgo his two remaining years of college eligibility and enter the NBA draft.

== NBA career ==
=== Cleveland Cavaliers ===
==== 2006–07 season and NBA Finals vs San Antonio Spurs ====
On June 29, 2006, Gibson was drafted in the second round with the 42nd overall pick of the NBA draft by the Cleveland Cavaliers. After a May 2006 pre-draft workout with the Cavs, Gibson canceled his remaining workouts with other teams and refused to work out for any other team before the draft. It is believed this was the reason Gibson fell to the second round after some thought he might be drafted in the first round. He joined a Cavaliers backcourt that was the worst in the league in scoring the previous season.

In his rookie season, Gibson averaged 4.6 points per game and led all rookies in three-point field goal percentage, shooting 41.9%. Daniel contributed in helping the Cleveland Cavaliers reach the NBA playoffs. Cavs coach Mike Brown gave Gibson his first place in the starting line-up on December 6, 2006, against the Toronto Raptors. He finished the game with 18 points, 5 rebounds, and 2 assists. Overall, Gibson started 16 games and averaged 8.8 points on 53.9% shooting in his starts.

Gibson had his first big playoff opportunity in game 3 of the 2007 Eastern Conference Finals against the Detroit Pistons. He scored 9 points, including two three-pointers. He also grabbed 2 rebounds, blocked 1 shot, and had an important steal from Tayshaun Prince late in the fourth quarter. He followed this in game 4, scoring 21 points, which came from only 6 field goal attempts. Gibson was also 12 of 12 from the free throw line. In Game 6, Gibson scored a career-high 31 points, sending the Cavaliers to their first NBA Finals.

Gibson was mentored in defensive skills by veteran teammate Eric Snow in the 2006–07 season.

In game one of the 2007 NBA Finals against the Spurs, Gibson shined off the bench, leading the team in scoring with Gibson scoring 16 points efficiently, on 7 of 9 shooting. The Cavs would go on to lose game one, however, 76–85.

In game two of the NBA Finals, Gibson score 15 points and overall being the second leading scorer behind LeBron.

His first start in the playoffs came in the third game of the 2007 NBA Finals, after an injury to Larry Hughes. Game 3 was one of Gibson’s worst performances of the entire playoffs. He shot just 1 for 10, and 0 for 5 from three. Shots could not fall, and the Cavaliers fell 0-3 in the series. He would start the following Game 4 as well.

In the final Game 4 of the 2007 NBA Finals, Daniel Gibson had a decent game, dropping 10 points to an eventual loss to the San Antonio Spurs. The series would be a sweep. He shot 4–10 from the field, and 2 for 6 from three. Daniel Gibson averaged 0 turnovers for the entire finals, and was the third leading scorer for the Cavaliers at 10.8 points per game behind Drew Gooden at 12.8 points a game. However, Daniel Gibson struggled defensively guarding Tony Parker who averaged 24.5 points a game and a finals MVP Trophy.

==== 2007–08 season ====
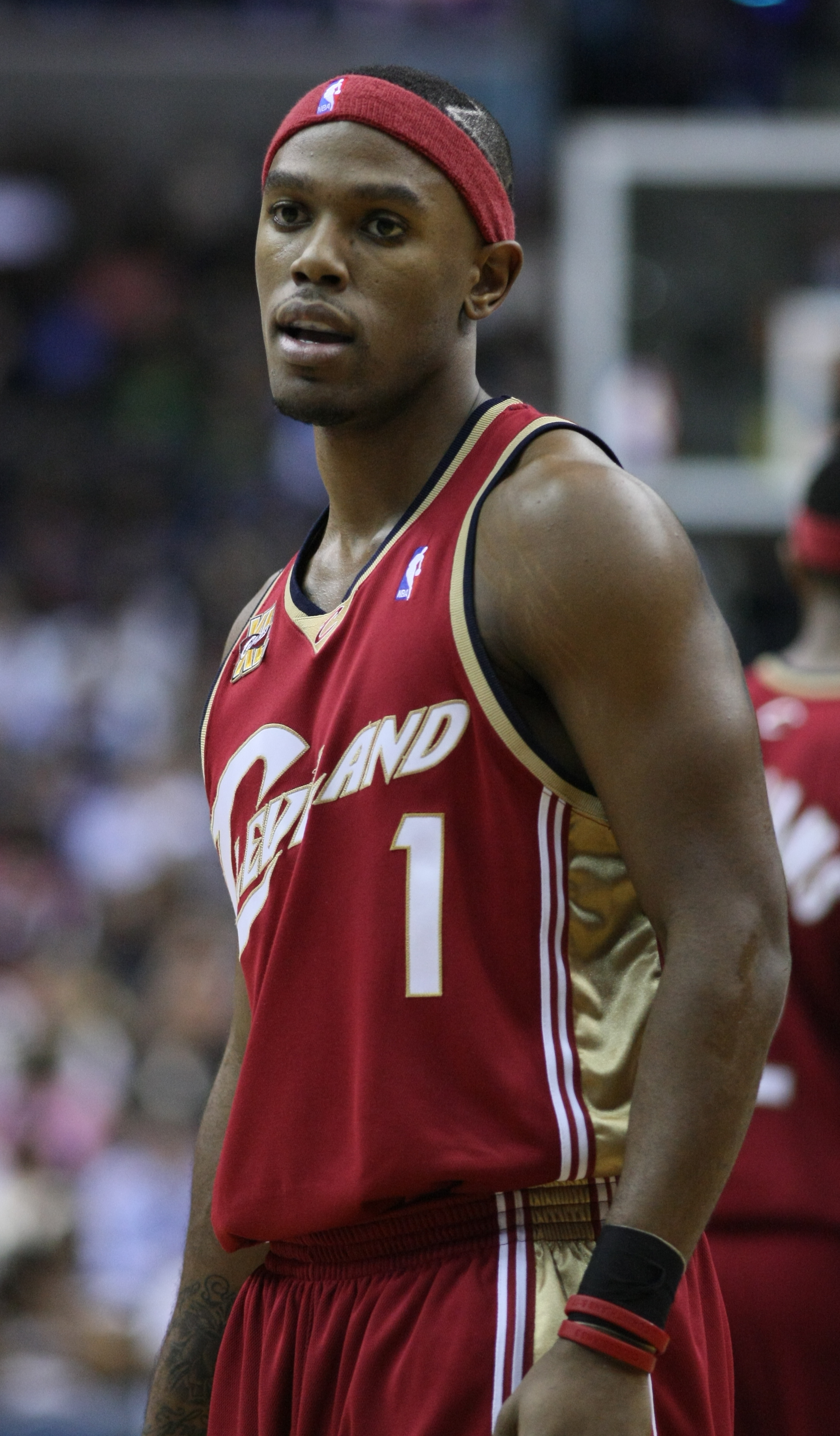
Gibson with the Cavaliers

Gibson played in 58 games, starting 26 of those. He averaged 10.4 points, 2.5 assists and 2.3 rebounds per game. He scored a season-high 26 points on November 20, 2007, against the Milwaukee Bucks. Gibson had a career-high six three-pointers against the New York Knicks on November 2, 2007, and a career-high eight assists against the Washington Wizards on December 5, 2007. Gibson ranked fifth in the NBA in three-point shooting percentage, making 44.0% of his three-point attempts. Gibson missed 18 games in February and March due to an ankle injury suffered when he and the Indiana Pacers' Travis Diener dove in the lane for a loose ball in the second quarter of a Cavs win over the Pacers. He returned to action on March 29, 2008, against the Detroit Pistons, scoring only 1 point in 18 minutes.

In game 5 against the Boston Celtics, in the Eastern Conference Semi-Finals, Gibson separated his shoulder and missed the final two games; the Cavaliers lost 4–3 in the series. Gibson said missing game 7 of the Boston series still haunts him: "I've had a lot of sleepless nights just wondering where I could have helped the team."

Gibson was selected to participate in the Rookie Challenge (Sophomore team) and the Three-point Shootout during the 2008 NBA All-Star Weekend in New Orleans.

During the first half of the Rookie Challenge, Gibson tied the record for total three-pointers made, despite not being a starter in the game. He later set the record in the second half with eleven total three-pointers, finishing the game shooting 11–20 from beyond the three-point line. Gibson was named MVP of the game, finishing with 33 points, 4 rebounds, 2 assists, and 2 steals.

Gibson finished in second place in the Three-point Shootout. He advanced to the final round by scoring 17 points in the first round, which tied him with Dirk Nowitzki for second place. In the final round, Gibson again scored 17 points, but it was not enough. Defending champion Jason Kapono tied the 22-year shootout record of 25 points for the victory.

==== 2008–09 season ====
On June 10, 2008, Gibson had surgery on his ankle in Houston. On July 16, 2008, the Cavaliers signed Gibson to a five-year, $21 million contract.

On November 26, 2008, Gibson scored his 1,000th career point in the Cavs' game against the Oklahoma City Thunder.

== NBA career statistics ==
Legend
GP	Games played	GS	Games started	MPG	Minutes per game
FG%	Field goal percentage	3P%	3-point field goal percentage	FT%	Free throw percentage
RPG	Rebounds per game	APG	Assists per game	SPG	Steals per game
BPG	Blocks per game	PPG	Points per game	**Bold**	Career high

=== Regular season ===
Year	Team	GP	GS	MPG	FG%	3P%	FT%	RPG	APG	SPG	BPG	PPG
2006–07	Cleveland	60	16	16.5	.424	.419	.718	1.5	1.2	.4	.1	4.6
2007–08	Cleveland	58	**26**	**30.4**	.432	.440	.810	2.3	2.5	**.8**	.2	10.4
2008–09	Cleveland	**75**	0	23.9	.391	.382	.767	2.1	1.8	.6	.2	7.8
2009–10	Cleveland	56	10	19.1	**.466**	**.477**	.694	1.3	1.3	.4	.1	6.3
2010–11	Cleveland	67	15	27.8	.400	.403	**.822**	2.6	**3.0**	.7	.3	**11.6**
2011–12	Cleveland	35	7	26.2	.351	.396	.791	**2.9**	2.2	.7	**.5**	7.5
2012–13	Cleveland	46	3	20.0	.340	.344	.703	1.3	1.8	.7	.1	5.4
Career		397	77	23.5	.402	.407	.780	2.0	2.0	.6	.2	7.8

=== Playoffs ===
Year	Team	GP	GS	MPG	FG%	3P%	FT%	RPG	APG	SPG	BPG	PPG
2007	Cleveland	**20**	**2**	20.1	.431	.409	.884	1.6	1.1	**.6**	**.2**	8.3
2008	Cleveland	11	0	**25.8**	**.449**	**.452**	.714	**1.7**	**2.5**	**.6**	**.2**	**9.0**
2009	Cleveland	14	0	12.3	.325	.357	**1.000**	.5	.4	.1	**.2**	3.4
2010	Cleveland	5	0	4.6	.286	.250	**1.000**	.6	.2	.0	.0	1.4
Career		50	2	17.6	.415	.407	.871	1.2	1.1	.4	.2	6.4

== Personal life ==
Gibson is the son of Byron and Cheryl Gibson. His father played basketball for the University of Houston. Gibson and his ex-wife, Keyshia Cole, have a son. The couple's 2011 wedding was filmed and aired on their BET reality TV series Keyshia & Daniel: Family First on October 9, 2012. The couple later separated in 2014.

On July 29, 2013, Gibson turned himself in to New Orleans police to face a charge of second degree battery related to an incident that took place earlier that month. His attorney declined to comment on the matter, but police said Gibson struck a man, breaking his jaw, in an altercation at a local night club.

After the 2012–2013 season, injuries to his foot and ankle, grieving his grandmother's death, and a lengthy divorce, Gibson began suffering from depression and anxiety, and began writing music to cope with the issues, contrary to rumors that he intentionally was starting a rap career.

In 2017, he toured internationally with other retired NBA players as a part of the Champions Basketball League and he and Cole were featured in the VH1 reality TV show Love & Hip Hop: Hollywood.

In 2018, Gibson was on the MTV television show The Challenge: Champs vs. Stars.

On December 10, 2025, Gibson was arrested during a traffic stop. He was pulled over by Beachwood police for driving a pickup truck with no tail lights. He had an active warrant out of Mansfield Municipal Court for failing to appear in court on a speeding ticket issued by the Ohio State Highway Patrol from 2023.

== See also ==
- List of National Basketball Association career 3-point field goal percentage leaders
