= Keyshia Cole: The Way It Is =

- Season 2 DVD cover
- Genre: Reality television
- Created by: James DuBose; Keyshia Cole
- Starring: Keyshia Cole; Neffeteria Pugh; Frankie Lons
- Country of origin: United States
- Original language: English
- No. of seasons: 3

Original release
- Network: BET
- Release: July 12, 2006 – December 30, 2008

Related
- Frankie & Neffe

Keyshia Cole: The Way It Is is an American reality television series starring R&B singer Keyshia Cole. The program aired on BET from July 12, 2006, to December 30, 2008, over three seasons. It documented Cole's professional career and personal life, particularly her efforts to reconnect with her biological mother, Frankie Lons, and older sister, Neffeteria Pugh. The series was produced by BET and DuBose Entertainment, with James DuBose serving as an executive producer.

== Production ==
The series was developed for BET as a docudrama chronicling Cole's music career and relationships with her family. Its first season premiered on July 12, 2006, and consisted of six episodes, concluding on August 16. The season followed Cole as she balanced her growing career with efforts to reconnect with her estranged mother and support her older sister and extended family. In an interview with OK!, Cole discussed the effect of appearing on reality television and her reasons for allowing viewers access to her family life. She said, "It just gave people a little insight on me and my family. I wanted that." DuBose, the series' executive producer, discussed its development in a November 2007 interview with the Los Angeles Sentinel. He described the program as an "organic, heart-wrenching story" and explained that the production team sought to document the family's experiences without scripting their interactions. He also discussed the decision to introduce family counseling into the program, explaining that the family members had agreed to participate.

BET announced a second season on July 17, 2007, which premiered on October 30. The six-episode season continued to follow Cole's musical development while documenting her attempts to rebuild her relationship with her mother and provide a stable home for members of her family. BET president of entertainment Reginald Hudlin described the first season as "truly compelling" and praised its "honest and exclusive storytelling". DuBose said the second season would be an "inspirational story" about Cole's determination and personal development.

The third season premiered on November 11, 2008, and concluded on December 30. It continued to follow Cole's work on her music while documenting conflicts among family members, their efforts to address unresolved issues, and a family trip to Trinidad and Tobago.

== Cast ==
- Keyshia Cole as herself
- Frankie Lons – Cole's biological mother
- Neffeteria "Neffe" Pugh – Cole's older sister
- Manny Halley – Cole's manager
- Yvonne Cole – Cole's adoptive mother
- Leon Cole – Cole's adoptive father
- Elite Noel – Cole's younger sister
- Sam Cole – Cole's younger brother
- Amina Harris – Cole's friend

== Series overview ==
Season	Episodes	Originally released	
Season	Episodes	First released	Last released
1	6	July 12, 2006	August 16, 2006
2	6	October 30, 2007	December 11, 2007
3	10	November 11, 2008	December 30, 2008

== Episodes ==
=== Season 1 (2006) ===
No. overall	No. in season	Title	Original release date
1	1	"Humble Beginnings"	July 12, 2006
Cole reflects on her childhood in foster care, while a young fan performs "Love" with her at a concert.
2	2	"If I Can You Can"	July 19, 2006
While on tour in Las Vegas, Cole has conversations with two fans about their personal experiences.
3	3	"Foundations for the Future"	July 26, 2006
Cole considers starting her own record label and poses for a fashion magazine.
4	4	"The Celebration"	August 2, 2006
Cole celebrates the success of her debut album and tour with a party.
5	5	"Waiting to Exhale"	August 9, 2006
Cole adjusts to life in Atlanta and spends time with her two closest friends.
6	6	"Mother Pearl"	August 16, 2006
Cole attempts to persuade her incarcerated mother to enter a drug rehabilitation program.

=== Season 2 (2007) ===
The second season premiered on October 30, 2007, and concluded on December 11.

No. overall	No. in season	Title	Original release date
7	1	"Reunion"	October 30, 2007
Cole purchases a home in Atlanta and invites Frankie and Neffe to live with her.
8	2	"Whatever It Takes"	November 6, 2007
Frankie struggles with public transportation, while the family's frequent complaints frustrate Cole.
9	3	"Girlfriends"	November 13, 2007
Cole invites her friends to Miami for a trip focused on relaxation and personal discussions.
10	4	"Business & Pleasure"	November 20, 2007
While Frankie and Neffe search for a home, Cole works to promote her clothing line and record label.
11	5	"Love for the Kids"	November 27, 2007
The women return to Oakland to revisit their family history.
12	6	"Black Family Reunion"	December 11, 2007
A visitor appears during a family therapy session as Frankie and Neffe react to Cole's decision to find them another place to live.

No. overall	No. in season	Title	Original release date
0	0	"It's a Family Affair"	March 20, 2008
A two-hour special featuring Cole and her family.

=== Season 3 (2008) ===
The third season premiered on November 11, 2008, and concluded on December 30.

No. overall	No. in season	Title	Original release date
13	1	"Life Coach"	November 11, 2008
Cole works with a life coach and trainer while Neffe moves into a new home and clashes with Frankie.
14	2	"Guilt-Ridden Moves"	November 11, 2008
Frankie struggles with guilt over giving Cole up for adoption and questions Yvonne's involvement in their family history.
15	3	"Let's Go to Church"	November 18, 2008
Frankie and Yvonne attend church together as Neffe confronts Frankie.
16	4	"By Faith We Strive"	November 25, 2008
Cole seeks spiritual guidance while Frankie and Neffe continue to deal with unresolved conflict.
17	5	"Family Vacation"	December 2, 2008
Cole takes her family to Trinidad and Tobago in an effort to improve their relationships.
18	6	"Learn From My Mistakes"	December 9, 2008
Cole takes her niece shopping for school, donates clothing to a community organization, and spends time with her family at a water park.
19	7	"Nothing But the Blood"	December 16, 2008
Neffe meets with Bishop Eddie Long to discuss her son's baptism while Cole completes work on her album.
20	8	"Full Circle"	December 23, 2008
Cole visits a youth center and contributes to its annual fundraiser as Neffe argues with her son's father.
21	9	"Transition in Action"	December 30, 2008
Frankie and Neffe attend family therapy while Neffe continues to struggle with her personal relationships and faith.
22	10	"New Beginnings"	December 30, 2008
Neffe celebrates her birthday in Las Vegas as Frankie prepares to live independently.

== Ratings and viewership ==
The series became one of BET's successful reality programs during its run. The October 30, 2007, premiere of the second season attracted 1.24 million households and 1.49 million total viewers, making it the network's then-highest-rated telecast, according to Cynopsis. The third-season premiere drew 1.94 million viewers and was described in Viacom's fourth-quarter 2008 report as the most-watched original-series premiere in BET's history at the time. The third-season finale, which aired on December 30, 2008, attracted 2.1 million viewers. This was below the 2.9 million viewers reported for the second-season finale in December 2007.

== Reception ==
In a November 2007 profile in the Los Angeles Sentinel, Stephanie Frederic praised the production, describing it as a "compelling and cleverly produced series" that presented "the real side" of Cole's life. Reviewing the second-season DVD for the African American Literature Book Club, Kam Williams awarded it four stars, although his assessment of the program was sharply critical. He called it a "jaw-dropping train wreck" and argued that it appealed to a "lower common denominator" than other reality programs. Melissa Camacho of Common Sense Media discussed the series' treatment of family relationships, personal hardship, and reconciliation. She noted that, despite the family's conflicts, its members "genuinely want to make it work". The review also identified discussions of substance abuse, domestic violence, and child abandonment, as well as frequent arguments and strong language.

=== Accolades ===
The series received a nomination at the 40th NAACP Image Awards in 2009 for Outstanding Reality Program (Series).

== Spin-off ==
The series led to the spin-off Frankie & Neffe, which followed Lons and Pugh. BET announced the program in May 2009, with its premiere scheduled for August 18. DuBose said the spin-off would document the pair's development and independence, explaining that "everyone has a Frankie and Neffe in their family".
