= Mayer Hawthorne discography =

The discography of American singer Mayer Hawthorne consists of ten studio albums, five EPs, a live album, fifteen singles and seventeen guest appearances.

== Studio albums ==
List of studio albums, with selected chart positions and sales figures
Title	Album details	Peak chart positions								Sales
Title	Album details	US	US R&B	BEL (Fl)	CAN	FRA	GER	NED	NZ	Sales
A Strange Arrangement	Released: September 8, 2009; Label: Stones Throw; Formats: CD, LP, DD	147	55	—	—	134	—	—	—	
How Do You Do	Released: October 11, 2011; Label: Universal Republic; Formats: CD, LP, DD	52	8	—	96	—	—	70	28	
Where Does This Door Go	Released: July 16, 2013; Label: Republic; Formats: CD, LP, DD	30	10	81	—	—	57	92	—	US: 38,000
The Big Knock (with 14KT as Jaded Incorporated)	Released: June 17, 2014; Label: Casablanca Music; Formats: CD, LP, DD	—	—	—	—	—	—	—	—	
Tuxedo (with Jake One as Tuxedo)	Released: March 3, 2015; Label: Stones Throw; Formats: CD, LP, DD	—	16	62	—	—	—	34	—	
Man About Town	Released: April 8, 2016; Label: Vagrant; Formats: CD, LP, DD	90	6	—	—	—	—	—	—	
Tuxedo II (with Jake One as Tuxedo)	Released: March 24, 2017; Label: Stones Throw; Formats: CD, LP, DD	—	—	—	—	—	—	—	—	
Tuxedo III (with Jake One as Tuxedo)	Released: July 19, 2019; Label: Funk on Sight; Formats: CD, LP, DD	—	—	—	—	—	—	—	—	
Rare Changes	Released: December 12, 2020; Label: Big Bucks; Formats: CD, DD	—	—	—	—	—	—	—	—	
For All Time	Released: October 27, 2023; Label: P&L; Formats: CD, DD	—	—	—	—	—	—	—	—	
"—" denotes a recording that did not chart or was not released in that territory.

== EPs ==
- A Few Tracks CD (2009, promo)
- Impressions – The Covers EP (May 11, 2011) (available for free download)
- Fux with the Tux EP – (Tuxedo EP, 3 tracks are also on Tuxedo II) (Soundcloud)
- Party of One EP (October 28, 2016) (Okayplayer)
- Rare Changes (2020, 2-track EP, both tracks are on "Rare Changes" Album)

== Live albums ==
Title	Details
Stones Throw Direct to Disc #1	Released: April 14, 2011; Label: Stones Throw; Format: Digital download, CD

== Singles ==
Title	Year	Certifications
"Just Ain't Gonna Work Out" / "When I Said Goodbye"	2008	
"The Ills" / "The Ills (instrumental)"	2009	
"Maybe So, Maybe No" / "I Wish It Would Rain"	2009	
"No Strings"	2011	
"A Long Time"	2011	
"The Walk"	2011	RIAA: Gold
"Thin Moon"	2011	
"Dreaming"	2011	
"The Walk" (featuring Rizzle Kicks)	2012	
"Get Ready"	2012	
"Her Favorite Song"	2013	
"Reach Out Richard"	2013	
"Cosmic Love"	2016	
"Love Like That"	2016	
"Lingerie & Candlewax"	2016	
"The Game"	2019	
"The Great Divide"	2019	
"Over"	2019	
"Healing"	2019	
"M.O."	2020	
"Only You"	2020	
"Chasing the Feeling"	2020	
"Rare Changes"	2020	

== Guest appearances ==
Title	Year	Artist	Album
"All Your Goodies Are Gone"	—N/a	Dennis Coffey	—N/a
"Active Balanced"	2010	Othello + DJ Vajra	The Required Taste
"I Still Love You"	2010	Nottz	You Need This Music
"Swimsuits"	2011	The Cool Kids	When Fish Ride Bicycles
"Love In Motion"	2011	SebastiAn	Total
"I Can't Go For That"	2013	D. Hall & J. Oates	Live from Daryl's House, Episode 44
"Sound The Alarm"	2013	Booker T. Jones	Sound The Alarm
"Do It"	2013	Pitbull	Global Warming
"Never Take It Away"	2014	The Aston Shuffle	Photographs
"64 Ways"	2014	Detroit Swindle	Boxed Out
"Deep End"	2015	Coucheron	—N/a
"The Buzz"	2015	MED, Blu and Madlib	Bad Neighbor
"Game Over"	2015	Bobby Caldwell, Jack Splash	Cool Uncle
"Paris Groove"	2015	Boston Bun	—N/a
"I Don't Know Why"	2016	Kraak & Smaak	Juicy Fruit
"Paper Proclamation"	2016	Suff Daddy	Birdsongs
"Genie"	2017	Busy P	—N/a
"Better Now"	2019	SebastiAn	Thirst
