= Woman to Woman (Keyshia Cole album) =

- Deluxe cover that replaced the original standard cover for later pressings (Note: The standard cover features Cole with a different hairstyle and outfit also staring and holding a mask similar to her face backed by a strawberry pink background with a gold fence surrounding it.)

Studio album by Keyshia Cole
- Released: November 19, 2012
- Recorded: 2011–2012
- Studios: Cole's home studio (Cleveland); Chalice (Los Angeles); Geffen (Santa Monica); MSR (New York City); Westlake (West Hollywood)
- Genre: R&B
- Length: 49:19
- Labels: Geffen; Interscope
- Producers: Akene Dunkley; Akos Castelli; bink!; Darhyl Camper; Dru Castro; Eric Hudson; Harmony Samuels; Keyz; Mel & Mus; Rodney Jerkins; Sylvester Earl Powell; T-Minus; Toxic; Walter English III; Wonda; Vidal

Keyshia Cole chronology
Calling All Hearts (2010)	Woman to Woman (2012)	Point of No Return (2014)

Singles from Woman to Woman
- 1. "Enough of No Love" Released: July 3, 2012; 2. "Trust and Believe" Released: October 22, 2012; 3. "I Choose You" Released: August 23, 2013

Woman to Woman is the fifth studio album by American singer-songwriter Keyshia Cole. It was released on November 19, 2012, through Geffen and Interscope Records. Recording sessions took place between early 2011 and mid-late 2012, following the release of her previous studio album Calling All Hearts (2010). Cole enlisted a variety of producers, such as Darhyl Camper, Harmony Samuels, Rodney Jerkins, T-Minus, Vidal, and Wonda. Woman to Woman is primarily an R&B album that incorporates elements of dance-pop, with lyrics centered on themes of love, trust, betrayal, heartbreak, female solidarity, and romantic relationships. The album features guest appearances from Lil Wayne, Meek Mill, Ashanti, Elijah Blake, and Robin Thicke.

Three tracks from Woman to Woman were released as singles, all of which were supplemented by music videos. The lead single, "Enough of No Love" (featuring Lil Wayne), received a positive reception from critics and peaked at number 84 on the US Billboard Hot 100 chart, as well as reaching the top-10 of the US Hot R&B/Hip-Hop Songs chart. The album's second single, "Trust and Believe" was also a critical success and peaked at number 74 on the US Hot 100 Airplay chart and number 32 on the Hot R&B/Hip-Hop Songs chart, while "I Choose You" served as the third and final single.

Upon its release, Woman to Woman received generally positive reviews from music critics, who praised Cole's emotionally driven songwriting, vocal performances, and viewed the album as a return to the sound of her earlier work, though some considered portions of the album formulaic. The album debuted at number 10 on the US Billboard 200 chart, selling 96,000 copies in its first week. It also peaked at number two on the US Top R&B/Hip-Hop Albums chart. Further promotion was done by Cole through the Woman to Woman Tour (2013), which included shows in North America and Europe.

== Background and recording ==
In December 2010, Keyshia Cole released her fourth studio album, Calling All Hearts. The album debuted at number nine on the US Billboard 200 chart, with first-week sales of 128,000 copies. It spawned two singles, "I Ain't Thru" and "Take Me Away", which both achieved lackluster success, peaking at number 54 and number 27, respectively, on the US Hot R&B/Hip-Hop Songs chart. Following the album's release, she parted ways with her longtime manager Manny Halley and also disclosed that business disagreements played a part in their split. On March 30, 2011, Cole announced via Twitter that she had recruited a management team in place of Halley and also had plans to work on a follow-up album to Calling All Hearts.

"I am trying my hardest for this album to help them get over the bull that they go through with these guys even though I'm not experiencing it at this moment. I want to be supportive and understanding and caring to my fans as well."

— Keyshia Cole, Jet.

The development process of Woman to Woman took place between September 2011 and October 2012. On September 20, 2011, Cole confirmed via Twitter that she had begun working on her fifth studio album. She also deemed that the album's material was different from her previous four albums and described it as a return "to her roots". During the album's recording process, she told her fans that they could expect her "redhead Keysh" alter ego to return on the album and revealed that she planned on working with several artists, such as Brandy, Boi-1da, Ester Dean, and Trey Songz, among others. In October 2011, Cole hosted a Ustream session where she previewed snippets of then newly recorded material and songs, some of which were eventually included on the album. Early production and recording sessions involved producers Boi-1da, Cool & Dre, Earl Powell, Toxic, and Dean. In January 2012, record producer Sak Pasé stated that he had been working on songs with Cole.

On August 1, Cole appeared on the BET countdown show 106 & Park and revealed that the album would be released in late 2012, alongside her reality television series Keyshia & Daniel: Family First. During the interview, she said, "I took myself out of the equation this time around and I focused on my fans, just [to] make sure that they're gonna be happy". On August 9, Cole revealed that she was also working with hip hop record producers DJ Mormile and G. Roberson for Woman to Woman. Cole reunited with record producer Rodney Jerkins, with whom the singer had not collaborated since her second studio album Just like You (2007). Cole recorded the album in sessions at Geffen's headquarters in Santa Monica, Chalice Recording Studios in Los Angeles, Westlake Recording Studios in West Hollywood, MSR Studios in New York City (NYC), and Cole's home studio in Cleveland. The tracks were mastered by Chris Gehringer at Sterling Sound Studios in NYC and were mixed by Jaycen Joshua, with assistance from Trehy Harris at Larrabee Sound Studios in Los Angeles.

For Woman to Woman, Cole enlisted the help of several songwriters including Elijah Blake and Jessy Wilson, who co-wrote several of the songs. Cole drew inspiration for the songs from the real-life experiences of her friends. Explaining the writing process, Cole told J. Medina of Thisis50 that Woman to Woman reflected her musical growth and she wanted to speak directly to her female audience from her point of view. She continued, "I brought songwriters on for this album and we were able to capture some moments in some of [my friends'] lives as well."

== Music and lyrics ==
Woman to Woman is primarily an R&B album centered on women's perspectives in romantic relationships. In an interview with M Music & Musicians, Cole described its creation as centered on themes of "love, trust and betrayal," developed through studio sessions in multiple cities. Cole stated that the recording process encouraged emotional openness, explaining, "when I think too much… I could be feeling something and not want to say it… when I drink, my emotions flow." She also noted that working with writers for the first time allowed her to better express "pain" drawn from both personal and external experiences. ThisIsRnB described the record as incorporating Cole's signature emotionally driven R&B style while balancing vulnerable ballads with more confident and sensual moments.

Reviewers also commented on the album's songwriting and vocal approach. Alex Macpherson of The Guardian highlighted the detailed songcraft found throughout the record and observed that its closing stretch adopts a lighter and more flirtatious tone than much of the preceding material. Gerrick D. Kennedy of the Los Angeles Times noted that the album continues Cole's focus on music intended to resonate with female listeners through stories about relationships and personal experiences.

=== Songs ===
"Trust and Believe"
"Trust and Believe" is a sentimental ballad that continues the album's exploration of romantic betrayal and infidelity.

Woman to Woman opens with "Enough of No Love", an R&B and hip hop song about a woman who is fed up with being in a relationship where she is not appreciated, which features guest vocals from Lil Wayne. The next track, "Zero", features guest vocals from Meek Mill, whose verse is characterized as a "smooth cameo". Lyrically, the song revolves around a man who has been unfaithful in a relationship and has told multiple lies, as Cole sings on the refrain, "It pays to tell the truth, look at what you had to lose / Should think before you do / Did you not know the rules?" The third track, "Missing Me", is a smooth upbeat R&B song about the aftermath of a failed relationship, with lyrics expressing frustration over a former partner. It is followed by "Trust and Believe", a sentimental ballad that centers on a woman confronting an unfaithful lover who has been having an affair with the woman's best friend. Featuring sparse instrumentation accented by wailing guitars, the song culminates with Cole singing, "Trust and believe me, you'll never be me / I'm so over you, go get lost."

The album's fifth track, "Get It Right", is a new jack swing and dance-pop song where Cole believes her lover is cheating on her. The lyrics include: "You don't stroke it like you used to, do it like you used to, do it / Ain't got me moanin' like you used to, own it like you used to, own it." The next track on Woman to Woman is the title track, a duet with Ashanti. Julia Cox of Atlanta Black Star viewed the song as a "girl power anthem with a twist" as the duet depicts two women discovering they are involved with the same man before confronting the situation together. "Wonderland" is a tender duet with Blake that captures the feelings of a couple in love. It is followed by "I Choose You", a sentimental ballad with snare drums and horns. Lyrically, the song reflects on having an ex-lover that is irreplaceable, despite dating someone else. "Stubborn" is an uptempo dance-pop song that includes techno elements and a piano played in the background. The lyrics find Cole self-reflecting on how her stubborn ways have caused problems in her love life.

"Hey Sexy" is a 1990s-inspired midtempo song where she expresses her excitement over a newfound love. BET characterized "Hey Sexy" as a "contemporary lovemaking 'til sunset" song. "Next Move" features guest vocals from Robin Thicke, and centers around a standoff between a woman and a man with a complicated history, who do not want to admit their desire for each other. The album's final song from the standard edition, "Signature" is a love song about Cole finally finding love, with lines such as, "I can't believe I found love, I finally have peace". The song is believed to be dedicated to her then-husband Daniel Gibson. Among the additional tracks released on the deluxe edition of Woman to Woman, "Who's Gonna Hold Me Down" features a throwback wah-wah groove and centers on moving on after betrayal.

== Release and artwork ==
In October 2011, Cole announced that her fifth album would be titled Woman to Woman. The title was inspired by Cole's decision to connect with her female audience through the album. Its cover artwork was taken by American photographer Derek Blanks as an alter ego photoshoot, which took place on June 28, 2012. In August, Cole held a cocktail hour at the James Hotel in NYC to celebrate Woman to Woman and her return to the music scene, with the likes of Bevy Smith, Michaela Angela Davis, and Phillip Bloch in attendance. On October 11, Cole revealed the covers for the standard and deluxe editions. When asked about the album cover, Cole stated: "It's literally me taking my face off. I have to for a second step outside of myself. The pain I've experienced and the things I've been through, you don't forget." In a post via Twitter, she further explained that the concept behind the photoshoot represented "stepping outside my own emotions" and channeling what her fans wanted to hear.

Cole expressed her excitement for the album's release and guaranteed the enjoyment of her fans, deeming it a "dope album". Woman to Woman was first expected to be released in February 2012. However, more recording and production pushed the release to November 19, comprising the standard, deluxe, Target deluxe, and iTunes deluxe versions. On November 2, the album was made available for pre-order via iTunes. Afterwards, a listening party for it was held in Los Angeles on November 5, 2012.

== Promotion ==
=== Live performances and tour ===
Cole began her promotion of Woman to Woman with a live performance of "Enough of No Love" at the Essence Music Festival on July 6, 2012. Two months later, she performed the song alongside Lil Wayne at the iHeartRadio Music Festival on September 22. Cole performed "Trust and Believe" for the first time at the Black Girls Rock! ceremony, which aired via BET on November 4. The performance was met with positive reviews from critics. On November 16, Cole performed at WGCI's Big Jam event, where her setlist included "Enough of No Love" and "Trust and Believe". The same month, she performed both songs again at the Soul Train Music Awards. Cole performed "Zero" for the first time at An Evening of Stars: Educating our Future, an annually-held event promoted by UNCF, which aired through BET on January 27, 2013. She later performed "Trust and Believe" and "I Choose You" on Jimmy Kimmel Live!, in an appearance aired on March 19. On July 3, 2013, Cole performed at the Essence Music Festival, singing her previous singles as well as "Trust and Believe".

The album received further promotion from the Woman to Woman Tour, which started on March 28, 2013, in Westbury, New York. Prior to the inception of the tour, Cole expressed her desire to include strong vocalists as support acts, such as Brandy and Melanie Fiona. The first leg consisted of 18 dates, visiting venues in North America, while the second row of shows comprised seven concerts throughout Europe. Chrisette Michele and Mateo served as supporting acts during the first leg.

=== Singles ===
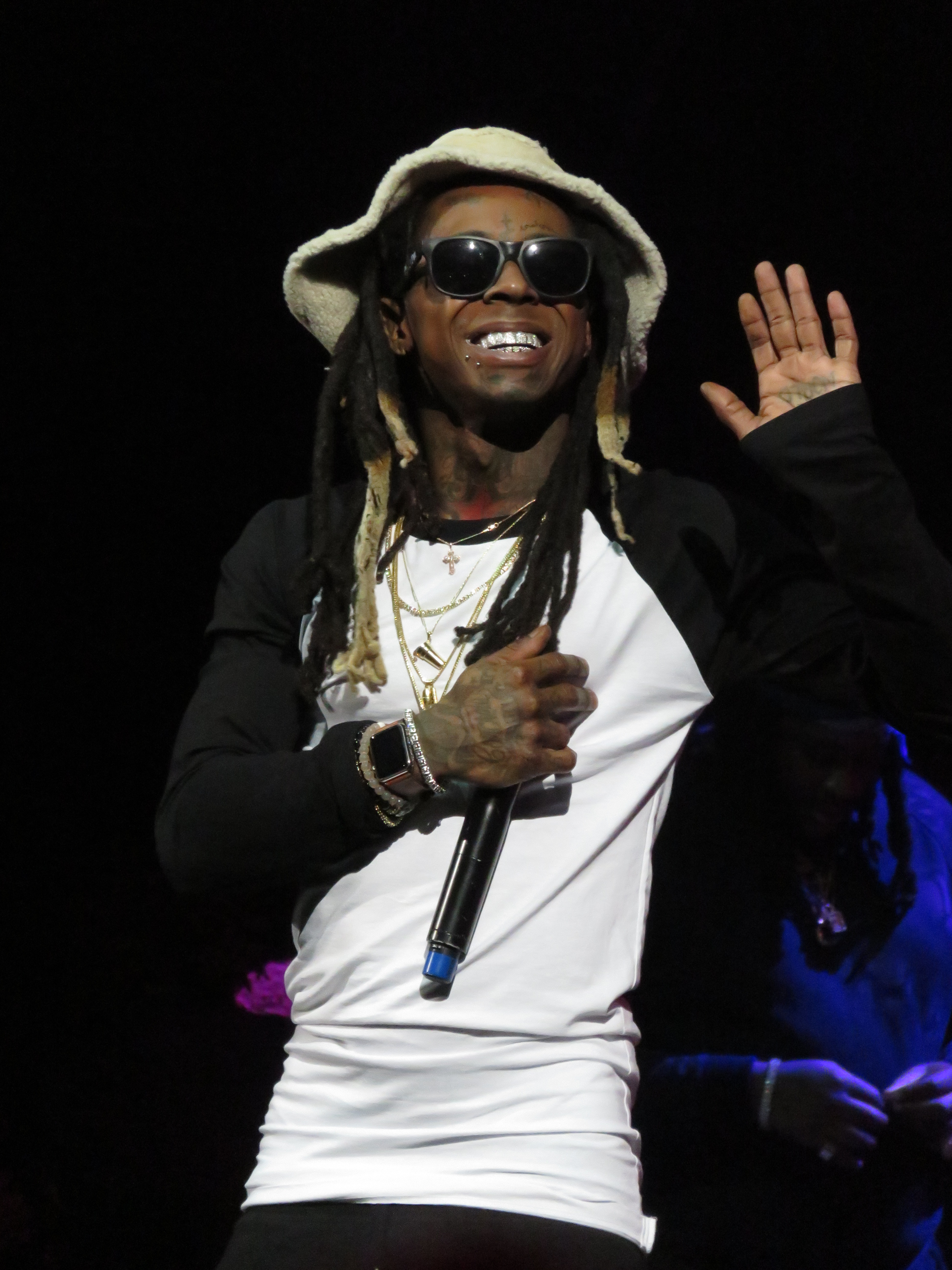
Lil Wayne appears on the lead single "Enough of No Love" with a guest rap verse.

The lead single from Woman to Woman, "Enough of No Love", which features Lil Wayne, was released for streaming and digital download on July 3, 2012, the day after its radio premiere. It received positive commentary from music critics; reviewers complimented Cole's vocals and the song's catchy chorus. Debuting at number 94 on the US Billboard Hot 100, it went on to peak at number 84, as well as peaking at number seven on the Hot R&B/Hip-Hop Songs; it remained on the latter for 20 weeks. An accompanying music video, directed by Benny Boom, was released on August 1, 2012. It depicts Cole in a state of emotional distress as she sings in a padded cell, while Lil Wayne raps his verse perched atop a piano.

"Trust and Believe" was released as the second single on October 22. The song peaked at number two on the US Bubbling Under Hot 100 and number 32 on the Hot R&B/Hip-Hop Songs; it remained on the latter for 18 weeks. Additionally, the song peaked at number 74 on the Hot 100 Airplay chart and number 15 on the R&B/Hip-Hop Airplay chart. Its music video, directed by Benny Boom, was released on November 8, featuring Cole playing the role of a woman who finds out that her lover and her best friend are having an affair.

"I Choose You" was serviced to US urban contemporary stations on August 23, 2013, as the third single of Woman to Woman. The song peaked at number 18 on the US Adult R&B Songs chart and remained on the chart for 18 weeks. Its black-and-white music video, directed by Ethan Lader, displays a story of Cole being in love with two men and struggling to choose the one whom she ultimately wants to be with. The music video premiered through BET's 106 & Park on October 2, 2013.

== Critical reception ==
Professional ratings
Aggregate scores
Source	Rating
Metacritic	78/100
Review scores
Source	Rating
Artistdirect	4.5/5 stars
AllMusic	4/5 stars
Dotdash Meredith	3.5/5 stars
Entertainment Weekly	B+
The Boston Globe	C−
The Guardian	4/5 stars
The New York Times	D−
The New Zealand Herald	3/5 stars
USA Today	3/4 stars

Woman to Woman was met with generally positive reviews from music critics. At Metacritic, which assigns a normalized rating out of 100 to reviews from mainstream publications, the album received an average score of 78, based on five reviews.

Tanner Stransky of Entertainment Weekly felt that the album served as a "time machine to the sweet, soulful R&B of the late '90s" and praised her vocal delivery on the highlighted songs. In a positive review for AllMusic, Andy Kellman applauded the album's concept and deemed it among her best work. Rick Florino from Artistdirect deemed Woman to Woman as an "essential record", and highlighted Cole's "magnificent voice" and "impressive delivery" on the album. Mark Edward Nero of Dotdash Meredith labeled the album as "angrily defiant" and "consistently good".

Steve Jones of USA Today designated Woman to Woman "Album of the Week", summarizing: "All that lying and cheating that men do really gets Keyshia Cole's dander up, and the feisty soul singer lets them have it on Woman to Woman. [...] Then she lets them walk." The Boston Globe's writer Ken Capoblanco elucidated the album as "a record from the heart that speaks on a universal level" and viewed the songs as "uniformly good". However, he criticized the album for its inclusion of rappers, as he felt that it "threaten[ed] to sink strong songs". Ben Ratliff of The New York Times found the recording to be "an R&B almanac of shaky romance [with] nearly every song [being] a first-person narrative with gnarled details, endlessly recombining data about suspicion, jealousy, pride, punishment, self-respect, the lead-up, the aftermath". Writing for The Guardian, Alex Macpherson noted that the singer "ranges through suspicion, frustration and anger, [with] her voice as heavy with emotion as ever". In a mixed review, Tamika Alexander of The Southern News criticized that "a lot of her songs are repetitive with the same concepts and messages", indicating a need for greater thematic and stylistic diversity. Alexander noted that Cole continues to depict her life through music, with a mature approach reflecting her growth, emphasizing self-worth in her vocal expressions.

Kristin Macfarlane of The New Zealand Herald eulogized Woman to Woman, viewing the theme as "strong", as well as indicating that it consisted of "anthem after anthem for those jilted by a lover". Rated R&B's Keithan Samuels deemed the album a "masterpiece" and considered it one of the best R&B albums released during the year. Dave DiMartino, for Rolling Stone, positively insisted that the album "will likely knock [someone's] socks off". In a favorable review for SoulTracks, Melody Charles described the album as "a collection of songs that are an equal mix of her present contentment and past turbulence and turmoil", and considered it among Cole's best work. Starrene Rhett Rocque of Jet suggested that the album "shows off her growth as an artist and a person as well as a fresh openness about herself". Bae Soo-min from The Korea Herald viewed Woman to Woman as a resurgence of the singer's signature sound of sentimental ballads and felt that she shows "how an R&B diva must sound like" on the record.

=== Accolades ===
Woman to Woman received two nominations at the 2013 Rated R&B Music Awards, for Best Comeback Album and Music Video of the Year, the latter for "Trust and Believe". The music video for "Enough of No Love" was also nominated for Best R&B Video at the 2013 MVPA Awards.

The album was included on several year-end lists for 2012. The Awl ranked it number 47 on its list of 50 Favorite Albums of 2012. In commentary accompanying the list, the publication's writer Seth Colter Walls said that the album's strongest songs made its listener willing to overlook what they considered the "patently boring" appearances by Lil Wayne and Meek Mill on its opening two tracks, while preferring the intensity of the album's title track and "Trust and Believe" to Frank Ocean's "Thinkin Bout You". AllMusic placed it at number three on its list of Favorite R&B Albums of 2012. In 2019, Rated R&B ranked Woman to Woman among its list of the 50 Best R&B Albums of the 2010s. The publication described the album as a "comeback album" that combined Cole's soul-baring style with radio-oriented melodies and contemporary production, and highlighted "Wonderland", the title track, "I Choose You", and "Trust and Believe" among its standout tracks.

== Commercial performance ==
Woman to Woman debuted at number 10 on the US Billboard 200 chart and number two on the Top R&B/Hip-Hop Albums chart, with 96,000 copies sold in its first week, becoming Cole's fifth consecutive top 10 album in the United States. Additionally, Woman to Woman debuted at number six on the US Tastemaker Albums chart. The album spent a total of 20 weeks on the Billboard 200, and had sold a total of 246,300 copies in the US by January 2013.

In the United Kingdom, Woman to Woman debuted at number 27 on the UK R&B Albums chart and number 87 on the UK Digital Albums chart, marking Cole's first entry on any UK chart since Just like You debuted on both these component charts and the main chart in October 2007. In South Korea, Woman to Woman peaked at number 85 on the South Korean International Albums chart.

== Track listing ==
Standard edition
No.	Title	Writer(s)	Producer(s)	Length
1.	"Enough of No Love" (featuring Lil Wayne)	Keyshia Cole; Dwayne Carter; Harmony Samuels; Sean Fenton	H-Money	3:49
2.	"Zero" (featuring Meek Mill)	Cole; Robert Williams; Vidal Davis; Tyler Williams; Melanie Fiona; Guordan Banks; Jessyca Wilson	Vidal; T-Minus	4:08
3.	"Missing Me"	Cole; Eric Hudson; Fenton	Hudson	3:41
4.	"Trust and Believe"	Cole; Darhyl Camper; Banks; Wilson	DJ Camper; Banks^{[A]}	4:16
5.	"Get It Right"	Cole; Melvin Hough II; Rivelino Wouter; Banks; Wilson; Elite Noel	Mel & Mus	3:50
6.	"Woman to Woman" (featuring Ashanti)	Cole; Ashanti Douglas; Betty Wright; Frederick Taylor; Earl Powell; Walter English III	Toxic; Powell; English	3:55
7.	"Wonderland" (featuring Elijah Blake)	Cole; Fenton; Jerry Duplessis; Banks; Wilson; Arden Altino; Akene Dunkley; Olivier Castelli	Duplessis; Altino^{[A]}; Dunkley^{[A]}; Castelli^{[A]}	3:53
8.	"I Choose You"	Cole; Jack Splash; Fenton; Lundon Knighten	Splash	4:49
9.	"Stubborn"	Cole; Rodney Jerkins; Paul Dawson; Fenton	Jerkins; Dawson	4:20
10.	"Hey Sexy"	Cole; Terius Nash; Carlos McKinney	Los da Mystro	3:57
11.	"Next Move" (featuring Robin Thicke)	Cole; Roosevelt Harrell; David Balfour; Banks; Wilson	Bink!	4:35
12.	"Signature"	Cole; Ryan Williamson; Banks; Wilson	Williamson	4:08
Total length:				49:19

Deluxe edition
No.	Title	Writer(s)	Producer(s)	Length
11.	"Forever"	Cole; Tyler Williams; Ester Dean; Clifford Harris	T-Minus	2:42
12.	"Next Move" (featuring Robin Thicke)	Cole; Harrell; Balfour; Banks; Wilson	Bink!	4:35
13.	"Who's Gonna Hold Me Down"	Cole; Harrell; Banks; Wilson; Isaac Hayes	Bink!	3:58
14.	"Why Lie"	Cole; Dru Castro; Uforo Ebong	Castro; Ebong	3:49
15.	"Signature"	Cole; Ryan Williamson; Banks; Wilson	Rykeyz	4:08
16.	"Try Loving Me"	Cole; Dashawn White; David Foreman, Jr.; D'ana Lewis	Grinehouse	4:21
Total length:				64:15

iTunes Store deluxe edition (bonus track)
No.	Title	Writer(s)	Producer(s)	Length
16.	"Here We Go"	Cole; Fenton; Jeanette Shakoor; Deondre Collins; Ernest Wilson	Trakmatik	3:57

Target deluxe edition (bonus tracks)
No.	Title	Writer(s)	Producer(s)	Length
16.	"I Can't Make You Love Me"	Wright; Greg Curtis	Curtis	3:53
17.	"Wonder"	Cole; Banks; Wilson; Chauncey Hollis	Hit-Boy	4:26

Notes

- ^{^[A]} denotes co-producer

== Credits and personnel ==
Credits are adapted from the liner notes.

Vocals

- Keyshia Cole – vocals, background vocals
- Guordan Banks – background vocals
- Sean "Elijah Blake" Fenton – featured vocals, vocal backgrounds
- Nikki Flores – background vocals
- Jessyca Wilson – background vocals
- Ashanti – featured vocals, background vocals
- Tiyon "TC" Mack – background vocals
- Terius "The-Dream" Nash – background vocals
- Robin Thicke – featured vocals
- Lil Wayne – featured vocals

Musicians

- Eric Hudson – drums
- Andrew Clifton – drums
- Earl Powell – keyboards
- Walter English III – keyboards
- Jannina Norpoth – violin
- Carlos "Los" McKinney – keyboards
- Ryan Viti – guitar
- Andre "Dre" Bowman – bass guitar

Producers and technical

- Harmony "H-Money" Samuels – production
- Vidal Davis – production
- Tyler "T-Minus" Williams – production
- Eric Hudson – production
- Darhyl "DJ" Camper Jr. – production
- Guordan Banks – production
- Fredrick "Toxic" Taylor – production
- Walter English III – production
- Melvin "Mel" Hough – production
- Rivelino "Mus" Wouter – production
- Jerry "Wonda" Duplessis – production
- Arden "Keyz" Altino – production
- Akene "The Champ" Dunkley – production
- Olivier "Akos" Castelli – production
- Rodney "Darkchild" Jerkins – production
- Paul "Hollywood Hotsauce" Dawson – production
- Jack Splash – production
- Kuk Harrell – vocal production
- Carlos "Los" McKinney – production
- Bink! – production
- Dru Castro – production
- Uforo "TAKTIX" Ebong – production
- Ryan "Rykez" Williamson – production
- Brian White – engineer
- David Nakaji – engineer
- Jaycen Joshua – mixing
- Chris Gehringer – mastering

== Charts ==
=== Weekly charts ===
2012 chart performance
Chart (2012)	Peak position
South Korean International Albums (Gaon)	85
UK Album Downloads (Official Charts)	87
UK R&B Albums (Official Charts)	27
US Billboard 200	10
US Top R&B/Hip-Hop Albums (Billboard)	2

2013 chart performance
Chart (2013)	Peak position
US Top R&B Albums (Billboard)	4

=== Year-end charts ===
2013 year-end chart performance
Chart (2013)	Position
US Billboard 200	81
US Top R&B/Hip Hop Albums (Billboard)	18

== Release history ==
Release dates and formats
Region	Date	Edition(s)	Format(s)	Label	Ref.
Australia	November 19, 2012	Standard; deluxe	CD; digital download	Geffen	
Netherlands	November 19, 2012	Standard; deluxe	CD; digital download	Geffen	
United Kingdom	November 19, 2012	Standard	CD; digital download	Geffen; Interscope	
United States	November 19, 2012	Standard; deluxe; Target	CD; digital download	Geffen	
Canada	November 19, 2012	Standard; deluxe; Target	CD; digital download	Geffen	
France	November 19, 2012	Standard	Digital download	Geffen	
Germany	November 19, 2012	Standard	Digital download	Geffen	
Japan	December 5, 2012	Standard	CD	Universal Music Japan	
