= I Choose You (Keyshia Cole song) =

Single by Keyshia Cole

from the album Woman to Woman
- Released: August 23, 2013
- Genre: R&B
- Length: 4:13
- Label: Geffen; Interscope
- Songwriters: Keyshia Cole; Jack Splash; Sean Fenton; Lundon Knighten
- Producer: Jack Splash

Keyshia Cole singles chronology
"Trust and Believe" (2012)	"I Choose You" (2013)	"Next Time (Won't Give My Heart Away)" (2014)

Music video
- "I Choose You" on YouTube

"I Choose You" is a song by American singer Keyshia Cole released for her fifth studio album, Woman to Woman (2012) as the album's third and final single. Written by Cole, Jack Splash, Elijah Blake, and Lundon Knighten, with production being handled by Splash, the song was sent to US urban contemporary radio stations as the album's third and final single on August 23, 2013 through Geffen Records and Interscope Records. A sentimental ballad, its lyrics revolve around a love triangle.

Critical response to "I Choose You" from music journalism was positive, many of whom applauded Cole's vocal performance and the song's concept. It reached number 18 on the official US Adult R&B Songs chart. To promote the song, a music video premiered through 106 & Park on October 2, 2013. The video displays a story of Cole being in love with two men and struggling to choose the one whom she ultimately wants to be with.

== Background and composition ==
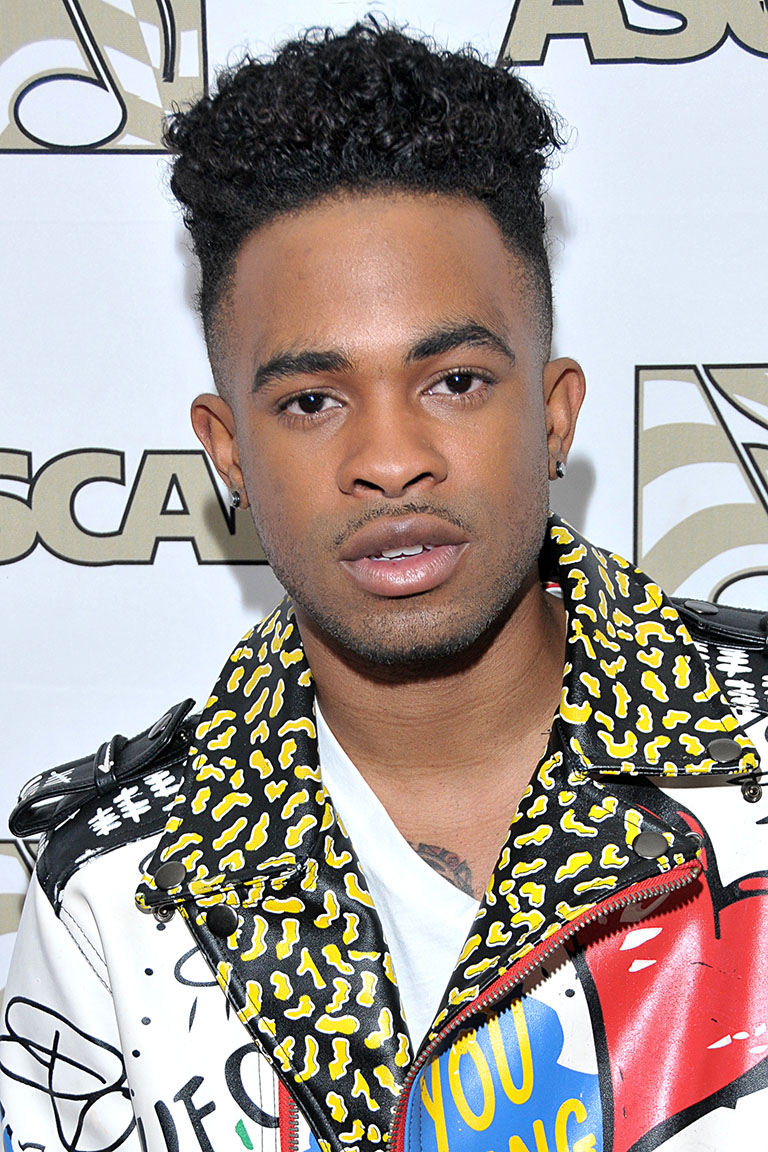
Elijah Blake co-wrote "I Choose You" and later discussed the song's development and circulation among several recording artists.

"I Choose You" was written by Cole, Jack Splash, Elijah Blake, and Lundon Knighten, while it was produced by Splash. The vocals were produced by Kuk Harrell and recorded by Splash, with additional assistance from Josh Gudwin. The track was mixed by Jaycen Joshua, with assistance from Trehy Harris at Larrabee Sound Studios, and mastered by Chris Gehringer. Blake described "I Choose You" as "the song that changed my life", recalling that it had been considered by several prominent singers before Cole recorded it. He said the song was first presented to Beyoncé for inclusion on her album 4, before being considered by Jennifer Hudson, Mariah Carey, and Mary J. Blige. Blake recalled recording a version with Blige and described the song's circulation among artists as increasingly competitive, saying that "it became the song that could" and that "it's the song that everybody wanted". He also said producer Jack Splash was "very particular as to the home of that record", referring to which artist would ultimately record it. Blake recalled that the song eventually reached Cole after her label expressed interest in having her record it. He praised Cole's vocal performance, describing "a bell quality with Keyshia's tone" and saying that "when she has that magic moment, it rings like a bell". He concluded that Cole "bodied it" and that her recording demonstrated, in his view, "She can sing."

In the summer of 2012, the song was debated as the second single, opposed to the previous single "Trust and Believe". Cole has cited "I Choose You" as one of her favorites from Woman to Woman.

Musically, "I Choose You" is a sentimental ballad that lasts four minutes and 49 seconds. The song's lyrics revolve around how Cole is forced to choose between two men that she is madly in love with. The chorus includes Cole singing: "And if it ain’t you / then it's just not worth it." Other lyrics include: "I tried hating you, but I just love you more / compared him to you, but he can't match your score". Melody Charles of SoulTracks implied that in the song, "she toggles between two loves before breaking down why one has heart over the other". Peneliope Richards of Singersroom interpreted that the song makes listeners understand that Cole was able to make that "grappling" decision.

== Reception ==
Ken Capobianco of The Boston Globe suggested the song's main concept as "making choices while staring down tough truths", and a writer from Jet identified it as the strongest track from the album. John Ricard of BET viewed "I Choose You" as a "slow song about an ex-flame" and praised Cole's "strong" vocals. Keithan Samuels of Rated R&B compared Cole's vocals on the song to her vocals presented on her 2006 single "Love" and picked it as a standout track on the album. Tamika Alexander of Southern News viewed "I Choose You" as a "soft song" compared to her usual work and praised Cole for "show[ing] off her vocals" throughout the track. On November 2, 2013, "I Choose You" peaked at number 18 on the US Billboard Adult R&B Songs chart and remained on the chart for a total of 18 weeks.

== Music video and promotion ==
The music video for "I Choose You" was filmed during August 2013 in Los Angeles, California. On October 2, 2013, Cole made a guest appearance on BET's 106 & Park and provided an exclusive premiere of the video. The video was made available on other digital platforms later that day. Prior to its release, Cole had posted a photo of herself while filming the music video, which featured her wearing the shoes from her Steve Madden collection.

In the black-and-white video directed by Ethan Lader, a story is displayed of Cole being in love with two men and struggling to choose the one whom she ultimately wants to be with. Cole is seen wearing a "lovely laced" bikini and a "Versace-inspired" outfit while singing in an intimate setting alongside being shown wearing an origami dress designed by Bishme Cromartie as she sings to the two men separately. The singer's hairstyle and looks were compared to the likes of fellow R&B singer K. Michelle. Derrick Taylor of Essence declared the two men in the video as "hunks", interpreting one as being "more clean cut" and the other being "more urban in style".

On Jimmy Kimmel Live!, Cole gave an encore performance of "I Choose You" on March 19, 2013. During her Woman to Woman Tour, Cole visited the Warner Theatre in Washington, D.C. on March 30 and sang the song following a couple's on-stage proposal.

== Credits and personnel ==
Recording

- Recorded at Jack's Jumpoff, Miami, Florida.
- Vocals recorded at Platinum Sound, New York City, New York.

Personnel

- Keyshia Cole – songwriting
- Jack Splash – production, songwriting, recording
- Roger Ubina – production
- Nicole Acacio – production
- Sean Fenton – songwriting
- Lundon Knighten – songwriting
- Kuk Harrell – vocal production
- Chris O'Ryan – recording
- Josh Gudwin – recording
- Jaycen Joshua – mixing
- Trehy Harris – mixing assistantance
- Maddox Chhim – mixing assistantance
- Ryan Kaul – mixing assistantance
- Chris Gehringer – mastering

Credits adapted from the liner notes of Woman to Woman, Geffen Records.

== Charts ==
Weekly chart performance for "I Choose You"
Chart (2013-2014)	Peak position
Netherlands Urban (MegaCharts)	17
US Adult R&B Songs (Billboard)	18

== Release history ==
Region	Date	Format(s)	Label	Ref
United States	August 23, 2013	Urban contemporary radio	Geffen Records; Interscope Records	
