= Enough of No Love =

Single by Keyshia Cole featuring Lil Wayne

from the album Woman to Woman
- Released: July 2, 2012
- Genre: R&B, hip hop
- Label: Geffen, Interscope
- Songwriters: Keyshia Cole; Harmony Samuels; Sean Fenton; Dwayne Carter
- Producer: Harmony Samuels

Keyshia Cole singles chronology
"Legendary" (2011)	"Enough of No Love" (2012)	"Trust and Believe" (2012)

Lil Wayne singles chronology
"Pop That" (2012)	"Enough of No Love" (2012)	"Ice" (2012)

"Enough of No Love" is a song recorded by American R&B singer-songwriter Keyshia Cole, released by Geffen and Interscope Records on July 2, 2012 as the lead single from her fifth studio album, Woman to Woman. It contains a guest appearance from American rapper Lil Wayne, who co-wrote the song along with Cole, Elijah Blake, and its producer, Harmony Samuels.

"Enough of No Love" became her first song to reach the top ten on Billboard's Hot R&B/Hip-Hop Songs chart since her 2009 single "Trust"; it peaked at number seven on the chart. By July 2013, it sold 70,000 copies in the United States. It debuted at number 94 on the Billboard Hot 100, and peaked at 84.

== Background ==
"Enough of No Love" is the lead single from Cole's fifth album "Woman to Woman" featuring American rapper Lil Wayne. The song was co-written by Cole herself and Harmony Samuels, Sean Fenton, Dwayne Carter and was produced by Harmony. The song was released in the United States on July 3, 2012. It impacted Urban radio on August 7, 2012 and Rhythmic radio on August 14, 2012.

== Live performances ==
Following the song's release, Cole performed it at the Essence Music Festival.

== Composition ==
The song is a heartfelt hip hop and R&B single. Based on the title, fans believe that its composition may be a flashback to Cole's debut album, The Way It Is (2005). It's reviewed to be an old school track with a hip-hop vibe. When describing the song, most record executives said that she's "back with a vengeance." Cole said that the song revolved around the lack of commitment in a relationship.

== Music video ==
The music video was shot on June 24 through June 25, 2012 in Los Angeles, CA. It is directed by Benny Boom who has directed several of Cole's videos, including her most successful chart-topper, "Let It Go". It features a cameo from Lil Wayne. On July 24, 2012 a thirty eight second teaser was released online, showing Cole in a white wedding dress locked inside a padded room. On July 30, 2012, behind the scenes footage was released in which Benny Boom described the concept behind the video saying “Conceptually I wanted to do something that was strictly fashion and beauty and just a little of narrative,” explained director Benny Boom. "I just wanted people to see her come back, just performing crazy. So I came up with this idea of her sort of being in this padded room as if she had lost her mind over love."

The music video premiered on VEVO on August 1, 2012 and on BET's 106 & Park later that day. With mostly favorable reviews, fans enjoyed the treatment and creativity of the video with grossing online views.

Christopher Vargas of Romeo's Corner was enthusiastic about the video and had this to say about the video "Based on the song it seems like Keyshia Cole has come back to her original form. The song is actually good and the video is just as good as the song. Keyshia seems to be so comfortable throughout the video."

== Charts ==
=== Weekly charts ===
Chart (2012)	Peak position
Netherlands (Urban Top 100)	49
South Korea (Gaon Chart)	19
US Billboard Hot 100	84
US Hot R&B/Hip-Hop Songs (Billboard)	7
US Rhythmic Airplay (Billboard)	37

=== Year-end charts ===
Chart (2012)	Position
US Hot R&B/Hip-Hop Songs (Billboard)	50
