= Lundon Knighten =

American singer-songwriter

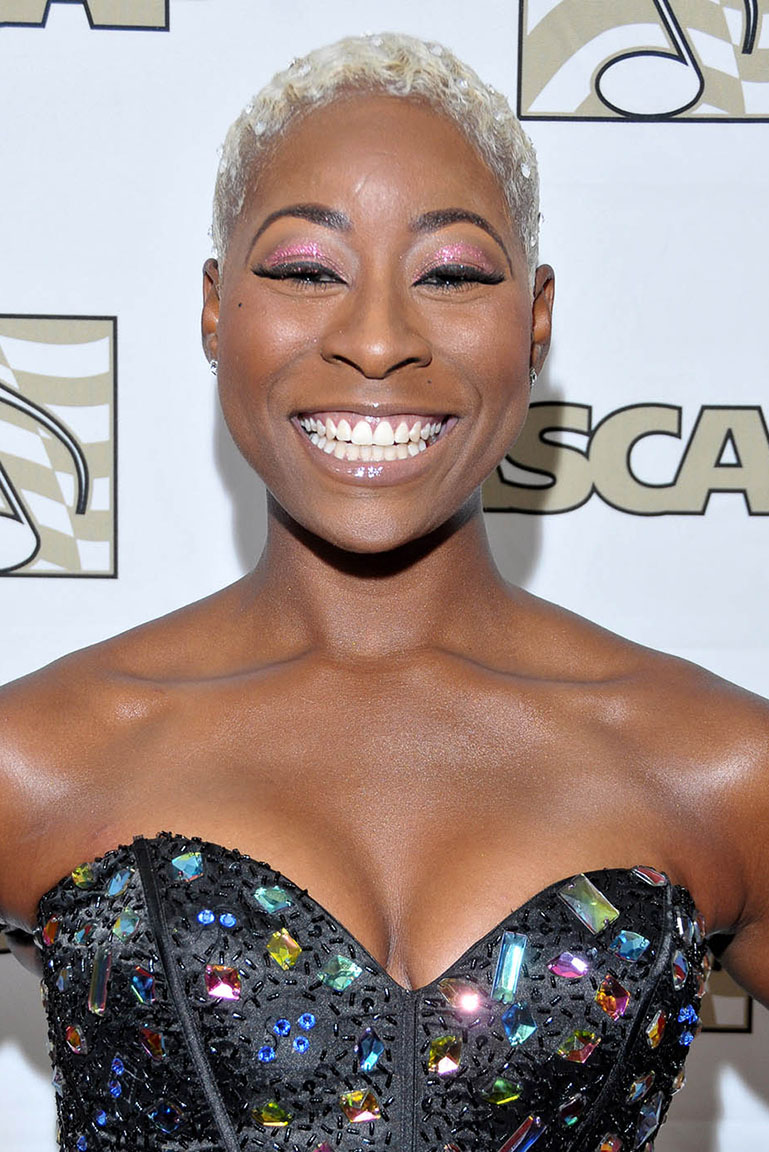
- Lundon Knighten, Beverly Hills, California on 25 June 2015

Background information
- Origin: Landover, Maryland, United States
- Occupation: Singer-songwriter

Lundon "Da Bridge" Knighten is an American singer-songwriter from Landover, Maryland. In 2010, Knighten signed a publishing deal to L.A. Reid Music Publishing. At the time, L.A. Reid Music Publishing had an exclusive partnership deal with EMI Music Publishing. Shortly before landing the deal, she would receive her first placement, "Can't Breathe", on Leona Lewis’ second studio album Echo.

In 2012, EMI Music Publishing was acquired by Sony/ATV. As a result, Knighten was signed to Sony/ATV. She has worked with artists Usher, Keyshia Cole, Chris Brown, and Teairra Mari. Knighten has also written with hit-making producers Jim Jonsin, DJ Khaled, and Harvey Mason, Jr. Knighten's work on the Usher hit single "Lemme See" earned the young songwriter the number two spot on the US Billboard Hot R&B/Hip-Hop Songs chart.

In August 2013, Knighten released Da Bridge, a mixtape project where she introduces herself as a performing artist. The mixtape's title is an ode to the songwriter's industry nickname.

While remaining a working songwriter for several major artists, Knighten is also prepping for the release of her debut album.

LundonDaBridge.Net

== Discography ==
=== Mixtape ===
- DaBridge (2012)

== Writing credits ==
List of songs written or co-written by Knighten.

| Title | Year | Album | Artist(s) |
|---|---|---|---|
| "Can't Breathe" | 2009 | Echo | Leona Lewis |
| "Body" | 2010 | Sincerely Yours (EP) | Teairra Mari |
| "Boy Shorts [Remix]" (ft. Teairra Mari) | 2010 | —- | Mr. Vegas |
| "Keshia" | 2011 | —- | Jawan Harris |
| "Legendary" (ft. Chris Brown, Keyshia Cole, NeYo) | 2011 | We The Best Forever | DJ Khaled |
| "Complicated" (ft. Wale) | 2012 | Truth N' the Booth (mixtape) | LaTocha Scott |
| "Lemme See" | 2012 | Looking 4 Myself | Usher |
| "My Clique" | 2012 | —- | OMG Girlz |
| "What I Do" | 2012 | —- | Webbie |
| "I Choose You" | 2012 | Woman to Woman | Keyshia Cole |
| "Love Me Long Time" (ft. Future) | 2013 | Dark Side, Vol. 3 | Fat Joe |
