= Long Way Down (Keyshia Cole song) =

Promotional single by Keyshia Cole

from the album Calling All Hearts
- Released: November 21, 2010
- Recorded: 2010
- Genre: R&B
- Length: 4:01
- Label: Geffen
- Songwriters: Cole, E. Ortiz, K. Crowe, S. Jordan
- Producer: J.U.S.T.I.C.E. League

Long Way Down is a song by American R&B singer Keyshia Cole from her fourth studio album Calling All Hearts. This single was produced by J.U.S.T.I.C.E. League.

== Song information ==
This song is about being in a relationship with someone sent from Heaven, very much related to her relationship with then fiancé, Daniel Gibson. Therefore, she says it's a Long Way Down falling from Heaven. She also states the disadvantages of her previous relationship and saying that's not what she wants anymore. It is believed to be written after she met her fiancée.

== Music video ==
The video was directed by Benny Boom in Los Angeles and features Daniel Gibson opposite Cole. Cole premiered the video for this song at 106 and Park along with "I Ain't Thru" with Nicki Minaj on November 29, 2010.

== Chart performance ==
Although not officially released as a commercial single, "Long Way Down" made its way on the Billboard US Hot R&B/Hip-Hop Songs chart at number 91.

Chart (2011)	Peak position
US Hot R&B/Hip-Hop Songs (Billboard)	91
