= Trust and Believe =

Single by Keyshia Cole

from the album Woman to Woman
- Released: October 22, 2012
- Genre: R&B
- Label: Geffen, Interscope
- Songwriters: Keyshia Cole, Darhyl Camper Jr., Jessyca Wilson & Guordan Banks
- Producer: DJ Camper

Keyshia Cole singles chronology
"Enough of No Love" (2012)	"Trust and Believe" (2012)	"I Choose You" (2013)

"Trust and Believe" is a song by R&B singer/songwriter Keyshia Cole. It serves as the second single from her fifth studio album, Woman to Woman and the follow-up to "Enough of No Love". It debuted on October 2, 2012 on Cole's official website and was first released for digital download on October 22, 2012. The music video depicts Cole portraying a heartbroken and scorned woman as she discovers her partner was sleeping with her best friend.

== Background ==
"Trust and Believe" is the second single from Cole's album Woman to Woman. It was co-written by Guordan Banks and Jessyca Wilson of R&B duo the Righterz. It was produced by producer and songwriter DJ Camper. It premiered on Tuesday, October 2, 2012. The heartfelt ballad reflects upon Cole's position, with being cheated on by her ex-lover with her best friend. With it being one of Cole's favorites on the album, it shows the true premise of the album to help ladies with men who have done them wrong. In the summer of 2012, both "Trust and Believe" and "I Choose You" were debated as the second singles.

== Composition ==
Another heartfelt single, the song is very reminiscent of Cole's 2006 hit "Love". "I cried when I heard it" says Cole at an interview for Power 99 FM in Philly. Production of the single includes a sample from "End of the Road" by R&B group Boyz II Men and an instrumental resembling a beating heart.

== Promotion and release ==
The single premiered on Cole's official website on October 2, 2012. It was sent to Urban Radio and released for digital download on October 22. Just days later, the song was named as the number one song added to Urban Radio for that week. On Thursday November 1, 2012 the song debuted on Billboards Hip-Hop/R&B Airplay Chart at number 44 making it her biggest debut on that chart since "Love". Nearly three weeks after its premiere, the song was rereleased to online markets on November 13, 2012. On November 22, the song debuted at #14 on Billboard's Hot R&B Songs Chart and #39 on their Hot R&B/Hip-Hop Songs Chart.

== Music video ==
The music video was directed by longtime collaborator Benny Boom. Produced as a mini-movie, the video features dialogue and acting from Cole herself (crediting as Cole-Gibson) along with actress Tae Heckard and model Rotimi. It was officially approved on October 25. The music video premiered on BET's 106 & Park on November 8, 2012. On the week of November 13, 2012, "Trust and Believe" was the most liked music video of the year and had over a million views on YouTube.

=== Synopsis ===
The video starts out with Cole's boyfriend Dontay (Rotimi) telling her to open the door. We then see flashes of the future events happening as we see Cole standing in the rain. The shot then cuts to Tonya (Heckard) talking to Myeshia (Cole) outside the house. After Dontay tells her to give him a minute, he chats to Meyshia and gives her a few dollars. Tonya then tells her that "he really loves you" resuming her makeup. The video cuts to the present where Myeshia, her best friend Tonya and her new boyfriend Dontay are at a celebration party. Later, Dontay and Tonya make love in the bed and they have a talk in the car before they kiss. The next day, Myeshia and Tonya are having a conversation about Dontay suspecting of cheating on the former with another girl. It turns out that Tonya calls Myeshia and seems to be Dontay's new flame after having sex with him the other night. Dontay tries to talk to Myeshia but she rushes to the door avoiding him. Myeshia then wields a baseball bat and crushes the car window before Tonya drives off. In the end of the video, it shows the sex scene as before except this time Myeshia looks at the two before they frantically run out the house. They drive in the car but they crash their vehicle killing the both of them as Myeshia watches in shock. The credits appear before the last shot shows Myeshia (wearing black leather funeral attire) throwing a rose on the steps of the house before looking at the camera.

== Live performances ==
Cole's first time performing the single was at BET's special Black Girls Rock! where it was met with positive reviews. For the event, she opted for black leather skinny pants, which she paired with black booties, and a front flux rabbit fur and leather vest from designer Helmut Lang’s latest collection. Keyshia topped her look off with diamond/crystal accessories, and leather gloves. She performed the single again along with a snippet of her preceding top 10 hit, Enough of No Love at the 2012 Soul Train Awards. She also performed the song on the late night show Jimmy Kimmel Live! on March 18, 2013. The song has also been added to the setlist of her Spring tour, The Woman to Woman Tour.

== Charts ==
Chart (2012–2013)	Peak position
South Korea (Gaon Chart)	43
US Bubbling Under Hot 100 (Billboard)	2
US Hot R&B/Hip-Hop Songs (Billboard)	32

== Release history ==
Region	Date	Format
United States	October 22, 2012	Digital download
United States	November 13, 2012	Digital download
