= Calling All Hearts =

Studio album by Keyshia Cole
- Released: December 21, 2010
- Recorded: 2009–2010
- Genre: R&B
- Length: 43:09
- Labels: Geffen; Interscope
- Producers: J.U.S.T.I.C.E. League; Toxic; TheKidMave (M. Nathaniel Qahhaar); Song Dynasty; Big WY; Tweek Beats; Ron Fair; Jimmy Jam & Terry Lewis; Justa Beast; Big D; Renan Harrigan; Chink Santana; Timbaland; Dontae Winslow; Eddie & KC Hustle

Keyshia Cole chronology
A Different Me (2008)	Calling All Hearts (2010)	Woman to Woman (2012)

Singles from Calling All Hearts
- 1. "I Ain't Thru" Released: December 7, 2010; 2. "Take Me Away" Released: February 1, 2011

Calling All Hearts is the fourth studio album by American singer Keyshia Cole, released on December 21, 2010 in the United States by Geffen Records. Appearances on the album include Nicki Minaj, Tank, Faith Evans, Timbaland and Yvonne Cole.

== Background ==
Calling All Hearts is made of songs composed before and after Cole met her fiancé, Daniel Gibson. Cole wrote the second verse to "Last Hangover". Shortly after revealing that she was pregnant with her first child, Cole went into a short hiatus. She made her first appearance since the birth of her son at the 2010 BET Awards, performing "Airplanes" with B.o.B. In October 2010, Cole leaked an unmastered version of her single, "I Ain't Thru" to her Twitter followers in celebration of her birthday. The single was digitally mastered and then officially released. During this time, Cole shot the video for the single as well as for the promo single "Long Way Down". Cole favorited "Tired of Doing Me".

== Release and promotion ==
Two editions of the album were composed and released on December 21, 2010—a standard and deluxe edition. The standard edition was revealed to preview on Cole's Myspace Music page on December 16, 2010. The artwork cover shows Cole wearing blue lipstick and a red heart on her upper lip.

To promote the album, Cole made appearances on The Tonight Show with Jay Leno, The Mo'Nique Show, and The Wendy Williams Show. She also made an appearance on 106 and Park on December 20 in which she did a 30-minute special performance. Cole also opened for music act R. Kelly for the second time on his 2011 summer Love Letter Tour. "So Impossible" received airplay on the urban adult contemporary radio around January 2011. Keyshia performed "Better Me" at the Revlon 'Run/Walk for Women' event.

=== Singles ===
- "I Ain't Thru" is the lead single from the album. An unmastered version of the single was released on October 15, 2010. After mastering, the official single was released for digital download and US radio on December 7, 2010. It peaked on the US R&B/Hip-Hop Songs at #54. The music video premiered on November 23, 2010 on 106 and Park.
- "Long Way Down" was a promo single from the album. The video was shot in New York City and premiered alongside "I Ain't Thru". Although never officially sent to radio, "Long Way Down" peaked at #91 on the US R&B/Hip-Hop Songs chart.
- "Take Me Away" is the second single for the album. After being chosen as the next single from fans on Twitter, Cole sent the song to US radio on February 1, 2011. She also performed the song on Conan on January 19, 2011. The song peaked on the US R&B/Hip-Hop Songs at #27. The music video premiered on April 18, 2011 on 106 and Park.

== Critical reception ==
Professional ratings
Aggregate scores
Source	Rating
Metacritic	66/100
Review scores
Source	Rating
Allmusic	3.5/5 stars
The New York Times	(mixed)
Rolling Stone	3.5/5 stars
USA Today	3/4 stars

Calling All Hearts received mixed to positive reviews from most critics. At Metacritic, which assigns a normalized rating out of 100 to reviews from mainstream critics, the album received an average score of 66, based on 4 reviews, which indicates "generally favorable reviews". Allmusic editor Andy Kellman gave it a gave it three-and-a-half out of five stars and commented that the album "drags in spots, due in part to an absence of a "Let It Go"-type track to break up all the introspection and pain," but it is the kind of album "for those who want to hear a moody, emotional outpouring."

Jon Pareles of The New York Times viewed that the album had a standard mix of featured artists and producers, but "after an initial bit of competitive posturing [...] the songs slip into the background. Ms. Cole sings elegantly complex vocal harmonies, but the central melody lines are shapeless. Most tempos are determinedly slow." Rolling Stone's Jonah Weiner gave it three-and-a-half out of five stars and wrote that "Cole is a heroine who thrives off tales of conflict, betrayal and survival. Her voice is as grit-flecked as ever, chewing through blaring beats and going pound-for-pound for ferocity [...] It's not all fisticuffs [...] but Cole is at her best when she's slugging." Steve Jones of USA Today gave the album three out of four stars and commented that "Her passionate vocals still pack a wallop, even though they are no longer fueled by angst".

== Commercial performance ==
The album debuted at number 9 on the US Billboard 200 chart, with first-week sales of 128,000 copies. It also entered at number five on Billboard's R&B/Hip-Hop Albums and number fourteen on the Digital Albums chart. In its second week, the album dropped to number ten on the Billboard 200 selling 36,600 copies.

== Track listing ==
Standard edition
No.	Title	Writer(s)	Producer(s)	Length
1.	"I Ain't Thru" (featuring Nicki Minaj)	Keyshia Cole; Russell Gonzalez; Onika Maraj	The ARE; Ron Fair	3:59
2.	"Long Way Down"	Cole; Erik Ortiz; Kevin Crowe; Sly Jordan	J.U.S.T.I.C.E. League	3:59
3.	"Tired of Doing Me" (featuring Tank)	Cole; M Nathaniel Qahhaar; Frederick Taylor; Durrell Babbs; Jerry Franklin; Bob Newt; J. Valentine; Kris Stephens	TheKidMave; Toxic; Ron Fair; Song Dynasty	3:30
4.	"If I Fall in Love Again" (featuring Faith Evans)	Cole; Wytony Dillon; Mario Myers; Osten Harvey; Christopher Wallace; Burt Bacharach; Hal David	Big Wy; Tweek Beats	3:29
5.	"So Impossible"	Cole; James Harris III; Terry Lewis; Carla Carter	Jimmy Jam & Terry Lewis	4:35
6.	"Sometimes"	Cole; Justin Graham	Graham	3:47
7.	"Take Me Away"	Cole; Teray Jones; Irv Gotti	Chink Santana; Gotti^{[A]}	3:47
8.	"What You Do to Me"	Cole; Santana	Santana	4:19
9.	"Last Hangover" (featuring Timbaland)	Cole; Timothy Mosely; Jerome Harmon; Candice Nelson; Tim Clayton; Jim Beanz	Timbaland	4:18
10.	"Thank You" (featuring Dr. Yvonne Cole)	Cole; Edmund Clement; Kharon Clement	Eddie Hustle; KC Hustle	3:28
11.	"Better Me"	Diane Warren	Song Dynasty; Fair	3:56

Deluxe edition
No.	Title	Writer(s)	Producer(s)	Length
1.	"I Ain't Thru" (featuring Nicki Minaj)	Cole; Gonzalez; Maraj	The ARE; Fair	3:59
2.	"Long Way Down"	Cole; Ortiz; Crowe; Jordan	J.U.S.T.I.C.E. League	3:59
3.	"Tired of Doing Me" (featuring Tank)	Cole; Qahhaar; Taylor; Babbs; Franklin; Newt; Valentine; Stephens	N8 Tha Maven; Toxic; Fair; Song Dynasty	3:30
4.	"If I Fall in Love Again" (featuring Faith Evans)	Cole; Dillon; Myers; Harvey; Wallace; Bacharach; David	Big Wy; Tweek Beats	3:29
5.	"So Impossible"	Cole; Harris; Lewis; Carter	Jam; Lewis	4:35
6.	"Confused in Love"	Cole; Charles Harmon	Chuck Harmony	4:25
7.	"Sometimes"	Cole; Justin Graham	Graham	3:47
8.	"Take Me Away"	Cole; Santana; Gotti	Santana; Gotti^{[A]}	3:47
9.	"What You Do to Me"	Cole; Santana	Santana	4:19
10.	"Last Hangover" (featuring Timbaland)	Cole; Mosely; J. Harmon; Nelson; Clayton; Beanz	Timbaland	4:18
11.	"Two Sides to Every Story"	Cole; Dontae Winslow	Winslow	3:54
12.	"Where Would We"	Cole; Antwan Thompson; Jay Beckenstein	Thompson	3:27
13.	"Thank You" (featuring Dr. Yvonne Cole)	Cole; E. Clement; K. Clement	E. Hustle; K. Hustle	3:28
14.	"Better Me"	Warren	Song Dynasty; Fair	3:56

Notes and sample credits

- ^{^[A]} denotes co-producer
- "If I Fall in Love Again" contains samples from "Warning" by The Notorious B.I.G. "Warning" contains samples of "Walk On By" by Isaac Hayes.
- "Where Would We" contains elements of "Amber Dreams" by Spyro Gyra.

== Personnel ==
Credits for Calling All Hearts adapted from Allmusic.

- Drew Adams – assistant
- The ARE – producer
- Burt Bacharach – composer
- Matt Bang – engineer
- Jim Beanz – vocal producer
- Big Wy – producer
- Carla Carter – vocals (background)
- Ariel Chobaz – engineer
- Cary Clark – engineer
- Kahron Clement – assistant
- Deron Cole – hair stylist
- Keyshia Cole – A&R, executive producer, vocal producer
- Hal David – composer
- Reginald Dowdley – make-up
- Ron Fair – additional production, executive producer, guitar, producer, string arrangements,
  string conductor, vocal producer
- Ashley Fox – marketing
- Chris Galland – assistant
- Chris Godbey – engineer, mixing
- Irv Gotti – producer
- Alicia Graham – A&R
- Justin "Justa Beast" Graham – producer
- Bernie Grundman – mastering
- Manny Halley – A&R, executive producer
- Renan Harrigan – producer, keyboards
- Deshawn Hendrickson – producer, keyboards
- Tal Herzberg – engineer, pro-tools
- Ghaz Horani – assistant
- Buffy Hubelbank – A&R
- Eddie Hustle – engineer, producer
- KC Hustle – producer
- Jimmy Jam – instrumentation, producer
- Tiffany Johnson – product manager
- Sly Jordan – vocal producer
- J.U.S.T.I.C.E. League – producer
- Chris Lecky "Lucky" – engineer
- Terry Lewis – producer
- Onika Maraj – composer
- Matt Marrin – mixing
- George McWilliams – art direction, design
- Peter Mokran – mixing
- James Musshorn – assistant
- TheKidMave(N8 Tha Maven) – producer
- David Nakaji – engineer
- Seanitta Parmer – stylist
- Dave Pensado – mixing
- Bill Pettaway – guitar
- Tresa Sanders – publicity
- Kam Sangha – producer
- Chink Santana – producer
- Allen Sides – engineer
- David Slijper – photography
- Song Dynasty – producer
- Eric Stenman – engineer
- Timbaland – producer
- Kyle Townsend – vocal producer
- Toxic – producer
- Tweek Beats – producer
- Van Nakari – assistant
- Diane Warren – composer
- Eric Weaver – assistant
- Tremaine Williams – drum programming, engineer
- Frank Wolf – engineer

== Charts ==
=== Weekly charts ===
Chart (2010–11)	Peak position
South Korean International Albums (Gaon)	91
South Korean International Albums (Gaon) Deluxe version	64
US Billboard 200	9
US Indie Store Album Sales (Billboard)	17
US Top R&B/Hip-Hop Albums (Billboard)	5

=== Year-end charts ===
Chart (2011)	Position
US Billboard 200	96
US Top R&B/Hip Hop Albums (Billboard)	27

== Release history ==
List of release dates, showing region, formats, label, editions, catalog number and reference
Region	Date	Format(s)	Label	Edition(s)
United Kingdom	December 21, 2010	CD; digital download	Polydor	Standard; deluxe
United States	December 21, 2010	CD; digital download	Geffen; Interscope	Standard; deluxe
