= Jack Splash =

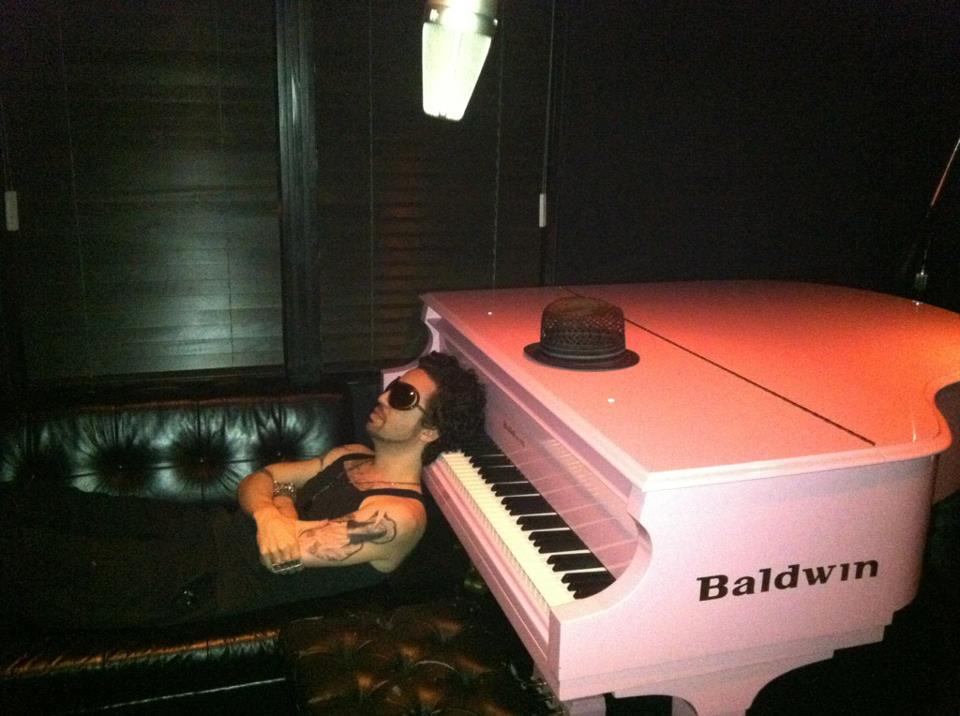

Background information
- Born: United States
- Origin: Los Angeles, California, United States
- Genres: Funk; soul; hip hop; R&B; rock; pop
- Occupations: Record producer; singer; songwriter; musician
- Instruments: Keyboards; drums; percussion; bass guitar

Jack Splash is an American recording artist, musician, songwriter, and record producer from Los Angeles, California. Splash's works have won multiple Grammy's and include writing and production on singles for artists such as Alicia Keys, Kendrick Lamar, J. Cole, John Legend, CeeLo Green, Solange Knowles, Mayer Hawthorne, Goodie Mob, Ras Kass, B.o.B, R. Kelly, Pixie Lott, Christina Aguilera, Jazmine Sullivan, Jennifer Hudson, Melanie Fiona, Musiq Soulchild, Tank and the Bangas, K. Michelle, Keyshia Cole, Anthony Hamilton, Dirt Nasty, Estelle, Elijah Blake, Groove Armada, Zap Mama, Raheem DeVaughn, Natasha Bedingfield, Lemar, Kelis, Katy Perry, Missy Elliott, Mary J. Blige, Sia, Valerie June, Cimafunk & Rhiannon Giddens.

== Career ==
=== 2003–2008: Plantlife ===
Before working as a music producer for other artists, Jack Splash produced and was the lead singer of an underground funk band from Los Angeles called Plantlife. In November 2004, Plantlife released their debut album The Return of Jack Splash via several different independent record labels internationally. Noted UK BBC Radio 1 DJ Gilles Peterson was one of the first early supporters of the band. The Return of Jack Splash was nominated and subsequently won Album of the Year at Peterson's Worldwide Awards in 2004. The album received critically acclaim; HipHopDX gave the album a rating of 9.5/10 and called it "incredibly funky funk from the soul". In 2008, Plantlife released their second album Time Traveller on Decon Records. The album was also critically acclaimed, with Pitchfork rating the album a 7.9/10 and writing that "singer/producer Jack Splash draws from Prince, Parliament-Funkadelic, The Ohio Players, and Rick James on a well-crafted love letter to funk."

=== 2008–present: Production work ===
After touring internationally with Plantlife, Splash began producing for several artists whom he met while on the road. The first artist he met and produced outside of his own band was CeeLo Green. To date, Jack Splash has been nominated for eleven Grammys and won three. In 2008 Splash won a Grammy for Best R&B Album for Jennifer Hudson's album Jennifer Hudson. That same year, the Jack Splash-produced song "I'm His Only Woman" (performed by Hudson and Fantasia) was nominated for Best R&B Performance by a Duo or Group. In 2009, Splash was nominated for Best Contemporary R&B Album for Jazmine Sullivan's Fearless. In 2010, Splash was again nominated for Best R&B Album for Anthony Hamilton's The Point of It All. In 2011, Splash's production for CeeLo Green "Fool for You" (featuring Melanie Fiona) won two Grammy Awards for Best R&B Song and Best Traditional R&B Performance. Also in 2011, Splash was again nominated for Best Contemporary R&B Album for his work on R. Kelly's Untitled. In 2012 Splash received another Grammy nomination for Melanie Fiona's "Wrong Side of a Love Song" for Best Traditional R&B Performance. In 2013, the Jack Splash-produced song "Now or Never" (written by Kendrick Lamar, Jack Splash and Jazmine Sullivan, and performed by Lamar and Mary J. Blige) was nominated for Best Rap/Sung Collaboration; Splash was also one of the producers nominated for two additional Grammys for Album of the Year and Best Rap Album for Lamar's Good Kid, M.A.A.D. City album.

In 2014, Splash took a short hiatus from producing for artists to focus on two of his side projects. The first group he formed with R&B singer Bobby Caldwell, Cool Uncle, released its debut album in 2015. Rolling Stone called the album "2015's Smartest Retro-Soul Revival" and Pitchfork selected the Cool Uncle song "Break Away" (featuring Jessie Ware) as one of the best tracks of 2015. The second side group, Semi Hendrix, was formed in 2014 with Los Angeles hip hop musician Ras Kass. The duo released their debut album Breakfast at Banksy's in 2015 via Mello Music Group. The Semi Hendrix album featured guest appearances from artists including CeeLo Green, Kurupt, Teedra Moses, Ras Austin, Taj Austin, Alice Russell and Wrekonize. The title track, "Breakfast at Banksy's", features a video directed by Jay Brown and animated by Ruffmercy. In 2016 the song was used to launch a Samsung Galaxy S7 television campaign.

In 2017 Splash resumed producing for other artists and released an album with Atlantic Records artist Lauriana Mae titled Can't Go Back, featuring guest appearances from artists including Dreezy, Raekwon from Wu-Tang Clan, and Manolo Rose.

Also in 2017, after seeing them perform on both the Late Show with David Letterman and NPR's Tiny Desk Concerts, Splash began working with St. Paul and The Broken Bones from Alabama and produced the entirety of their album Young Sick Camellia, which was released via Sony Music on September 7, 2018. The album debuted at number four on the US Billboard Alternative Albums chart and also made the top 10 of the Top Rock Albums chart. The lead single from the album, "Apollo", was called "Prince-worthy funk" by Rolling Stone. The song spent 20 weeks in the top 20 on Billboard's Adult Alternative Songs chart and peaked at number three on November 3, 2018, making it the band's first top-five Billboard radio airplay ranking. St. Paul & The Broken Bones performed several Jack Splash-produced songs on both The Jimmy Kimmel Show and Late Night with Seth Meyers.

In 2018, again after seeing an NPR Tiny Desk performance, Splash began working with the New Orleans band Tank and the Bangas. The band won NPR's 2017 Tiny Desk Contest. Splash produced several songs on Tank and the Bangas' major-label debut album Green Balloon, including the lead single "Ants". Green Balloon was released via Verve Records/Universal Music Group on May 3, 2019, and debuted at number three on Billboard's Heatseakers Albums chart.

On August 2, 2019, another one of Jack Splash's side projects (Brothers Voodoo) had a demo of their song "Keep You Alive" featured in the film and on the soundtrack of Fast & Furious Presents: Hobbs & Shaw.

In October 2019, Jack Splash began working with actress and singer/songwriter Cynthia Erivo on her debut album for Verve Records/Universal Music Group.

On November 20, 2019, after receiving critical acclaim for their Jack Splash-produced album, Tank and the Bangas were nominated for Best New Artist at the 2020 Grammy Awards. Also in 2019, Jack Splash collaborated with Milwaukee singer-songwriter Jon Brown on another independent side project called Kill the Motherboard. The duo's first single "Waaaaay Gone" was premiered by Complex, and their second single "The Water" featuring Eric Biddines was premiered on HipHopDX. Their debut album The Legend of Picasso Jones was released via Empire Distribution on June 14, 2019.

In 2020, Jack Splash and Valerie June met and started working on June's 3rd studio album which Jack and Valerie produced in its entirety. The Album, titled "The Moon And Stars: Prescriptions For Dreamers" was released on Fantasy Records/Concord in 2021. The album received massive critical acclaim. Pitchfork described the album as her "most heavy-hearted" and "far-reaching" record, and praised June for exploring themes of "love and loss" throughout the album. The Times said "one of the albums of the year" and gave it a 5 star review. Rolling Stone gave the album a 4 star review and said "The singer has never sounded more thrillingly herself". In November 2021, June received a Grammy nomination for Best American Roots Song for “Call Me A Fool” featuring Carla Thomas (produced by Jack Splash & Valerie). The song also achieved Valerie's peak radio position to date and was also nominated for 'Song Of The Year' at the 2021 Americana Music Honors & Awards in Nashville. June and Splash were also nominated for 'Album Of The Year' at the 2021 Americana Music Honors & Awards. Apple featured June's song "You And I" in their 2021 Christmas holiday ad directed by Ivan and Jason Reitman. "The Moon And Stars: Prescriptions For Dreamers" was featured in several year-end lists for 2021, highlighting its impact and acclaim. It was notably included in Rough Trade's "Albums of the Year," NPR's "50 Best Albums," and the New York Times' "Best Albums" list. These accolades reflect the album's broad appeal and the significant impression it made across various music critics and platforms.

Also in early 2020 Jack Splash and Cimafunk met and teamed up to produce Cimafunk's, "El Alimento" album during the peak of the pandemic lockdown. The album, (featuring George Clinton, Lupe Fiasco, Stylo G, Goyo and ChocQuibTown, Chucho Valdés and more) achieved unprecedented success for Cimafunk. "El Alimento" was highly regarded in several year-end lists for 2021. It was ranked #3 among the best Spanish-language and bilingual albums by Rolling Stone and was also included in NPR’s Best Latin Music of 2021. Additionally, the album was #1 on Le Monde’s list of Latin Music favorites for the year. Both Rolling Stone and NPR named El Alimento as one of the best albums of the year. A song from the album titled, "La Noche" was used as the main title song in the trailer for the feature film, 'Shotgun Wedding' (Jennifer Lopez, Josh Duhamel). The album was nominated for Best Latin Rock or Alternative Album at the 65th Annual Grammy Awards, bringing in Cimafunk's first ever Grammy nomination.

In 2022, Jack Splash met Rhiannon Giddens and started working on her next album, You're the One, which is her third solo studio album, released through Nonesuch Records on August 18, 2023. The album, produced ty by Jack Splash, is the first album from Rhiannon that contains only original compositions, with a guest appearance by Jason Isbell.

In 2024, at the 66th Annual Grammy Awards, the Jack Splash produced album by Rhiannon Giddens, "You're The One", was nominated for 'Best Americana Album'. Rhiannon also received a 2nd Grammy nomination for Best American Roots Performance for a Jack Splash produced song from the album, 'You Louisiana Man", which she recently performed on Jimmy Kimmel.

== Discography ==
=== Albums ===
- The Return of Jack Splash (with PlantLife) (2004)
- Time Traveller (with PlantLife) (2008)
- Heir to the Throne Vol. 1 (2009)
- King of the Beats Vol. 1 (2010)
- Cool Uncle (with Bobby Caldwell as Cool Uncle) (2015)
- Breakfast at Banksy's (with Ras Kass as Semi Hendrix) (2015)
- Can't Go Back (with Lauriana Mae) (2017)
- Young Sick Camellia (with St. Paul & The Broken Bones) (2018)
- Green Balloon (with Tank and The Bangas) (2019)
- The Legend of Picasso Jones (with Jon Brown as Kill The Motherboard) (2019)
- The Moon And Stars: Prescriptions For Dreamers (with Valerie June) (2021)
- El Alimento (with Cimafunk) (2021)
- You're the One (with Rhiannon Giddens) (2023)

=== Extended plays ===
- Extended Package (with Dirt Nasty as Chain Swangaz) (2011)

=== Production discography ===
Adapted from AllMusic.

Title	Year	Artist	Album
"Right Now"	2002	Cee-Lo Green	ATL Soundtrack
"Saviour"	2007	Alicia Keys	As I Am
"Wreckless Love"	2007	Alicia Keys	As I Am
"Teenage Love Affair"	2007	Alicia Keys	As I Am
"P.D.A. (We Just Don't Care)"	2007	John Legend	Once Again
"Kwenda"	2007	Zap Mama	Supermoon
"T.O.N.Y."	2008	Solange Knowles	Sol-Angel and the Hadley St. Dreams
"Ode to Marvin"	2008	Solange Knowles	Sol-Angel and the Hadley St. Dreams
"Would've Been the One"	2008	Solange Knowles	Sol-Angel and the Hadley St. Dreams
"Mo Better"	2008	Raheem DeVaughn	Love Behind the Melody
"Pretty Please (Love Me)"	2008	Estelle featuring Cee-Lo Green	Shine
"Girls Say"	2008	Groove Armada	Soundboy Rock
"Drop That Thing"	2008	Groove Armada	Soundboy Rock
"Switch"	2008	Jazmine Sullivan	Fearless
"Shallow"	2008	Jazmine Sullivan	Fearless
"I'm His Only Woman"	2008	Jennifer Hudson featuring Fantasia	Jennifer Hudson
"All Dressed in Love"	2008	Jennifer Hudson	Sex in the City
"Its Not What You Say"	2008	Lemar	The Reason
"Please Stay"	2008	Anthony Hamilton	The Point of It All
"Be My #2"	2009	R. Kelly	Untitled
"Nasty"	2010	Christina Aguilera featuring Cee-Lo Green	Burlesque
"Dr. Aden"	2010	B.o.B.	No Genre
"Fool for You"	2010	Cee-Lo Green	The Lady Killer
"I Want You (Hold On to Love)"	2010	Cee-Lo Green	The Lady Killer
"Befriends"	2011	Musiq Soulchild	MusiqInTheMagiq
"I Choose You"	2012	Keyshia Cole	Woman to Woman
"Now or Never"	2012	Kendrick Lamar featuring Mary J. Blige	Good Kid, M.A.A.D. City
"Bones"	2012	Melanie Fiona	The MF Life
"Wrong Side of a Love Song"	2012	Melanie Fiona	The MF Life
"Can't Do This No More"	2012	Melanie Fiona	The MF Life
"What Am I to Do?"	2012	Melanie Fiona	The MF Life
"Towers of Tokyo"	2013	Elijah Blake	
"Nasty"	2013	Pixie Lott	Pixie Lott
"The Only One"	2013	Mayer Hawthorne	Where Does This Door Go
"The Innocent"	2013	Mayer Hawthorne	Where Does This Door Go
"Kaila"	2013	Mayer Hawthorne	Where Does This Door Go
"Valleujah"	2013	Goodie Mob	Age Against the Machine
"Sometimes"	2013	K. Michelle	Rebellious Soul
"Tiring Game"	2015	John Newman featuring Charlie Wilson	Revolve
"We All Get Lonely"	2015	John Newman	Revolve
"Give You My Love"	2015	John Newman	Revolve
"NYPD Blues"	2015	Lauriana Mae	City of Diamonds
"Marvelous"	2015	Lauriana Mae	City of Diamonds
"Get You Back"	2016	Mayer Hawthorne	Man About Town
"Hanging Tree"	2017	Elijah Blake	
"Different"	2017	Lauriana Mae	Can't Go Back
"Beautiful"	2017	Lauriana Mae featuring Eric Biddines	Can't Go Back
"Can't Go Back"	2017	Lauriana Mae	Can't Go Back
"LOL"	2017	Lauriana Mae featuring Dreezy	Can't Go Back
"Protect Ya Neck"	2017	Lauriana Mae featuring Raekwon	Can't Go Back
"Cumulus pt. 1"	2018	St. Paul and The Broken Bones	Young Sick Camellia
"Convex"	2018	St. Paul and The Broken Bones	Young Sick Camellia
"Got It Bad"	2018	St. Paul and The Broken Bones	Young Sick Camellia
"NASA"	2018	St. Paul and The Broken Bones	Young Sick Camellia
"Mature pt. 2"	2018	St. Paul and The Broken Bones	Young Sick Camellia
"Apollo"	2018	St. Paul and The Broken Bones	Young Sick Camellia
"Mr. Invisible"	2018	St. Paul and The Broken Bones	Young Sick Camellia
"Hurricanes"	2018	St. Paul and The Broken Bones	Young Sick Camellia
"Dissipating pt. 3"	2018	St. Paul and The Broken Bones	Young Sick Camellia
"LiveWithoutU"	2018	St. Paul and The Broken Bones	Young Sick Camellia
"Concave"	2018	St. Paul and The Broken Bones	Young Sick Camellia
"CaveFlora pt. 1"	2018	St. Paul and The Broken Bones	Young Sick Camellia
"Bruised Fruit"	2018	St. Paul and The Broken Bones	Young Sick Camellia
Apollo - Radio Edit	2018	St. Paul and The Broken Bones	Young Sick Camellia
Ants	2019	Tank and the Bangas	Green Balloon
Hot Air Ballons	2019	Tank and the Bangas	Green Balloon
Colors Change	2019	Tank and the Bangas	Green Balloon
Forgetfulness	2019	Tank and the Bangas	Green Balloon
Stay	2021	Valerie June	The Moon and Stars: Prescriptions for Dreamers
Stay Meditation	2021	Valerie June	The Moon and Stars: Prescriptions for Dreamers
You And I	2021	Valerie June	The Moon and Stars: Prescriptions for Dreamers
Colors	2021	Valerie June	The Moon and Stars: Prescriptions for Dreamers
Stardust Scattering	2021	Valerie June	The Moon and Stars: Prescriptions for Dreamers
African Proverb (feat. Carla Thomas)	2021	Valerie June	The Moon and Stars: Prescriptions for Dreamers
Call Me A Fool (feat. Carla Thomas)	2021	Valerie June	The Moon and Stars: Prescriptions for Dreamers
Fallin'	2021	Valerie June	The Moon and Stars: Prescriptions for Dreamers
Smile	2021	Valerie June	The Moon and Stars: Prescriptions for Dreamers
Within You	2021	Valerie June	The Moon and Stars: Prescriptions for Dreamers
Why The Bright Stars Glow	2021	Valerie June	The Moon and Stars: Prescriptions for Dreamers
Home Inside	2021	Valerie June	The Moon and Stars: Prescriptions for Dreamers
Starlight Ethereal Silence	2021	Valerie June	The Moon and Stars: Prescriptions for Dreamers
Funk Aspirin (feat. George Clinton)	2021	Cimafunk	El Alimento
Rómpelo (feat. Lupe Fiasco)	2021	Cimafunk	El Alimento
Te Quema la Bemba	2021	Cimafunk	El Alimento
Caramelo	2021	Cimafunk	El Alimento
Esto Es Cuba	2021	Cimafunk	El Alimento
La Noche (feat. Stylo G, ChocQuibTown)	2021	Cimafunk	El Alimento
Salvaje (feat. Lester Snell)	2021	Cimafunk	El Alimento
El Reparto	2021	Cimafunk	El Alimento
Estoy Pa' Eso	2021	Cimafunk	El Alimento
Sal De Lo Malo	2021	Cimafunk	El Alimento
La Era del Sazón	2021	Cimafunk	El Alimento
No Me Alcanza (feat. Los Papines)	2021	Cimafunk	El Alimento
Como Te Descargo	2021	Cimafunk	El Alimento
Tears	2021	Cynthia Erivo	Ch. 1 Vs. 1
Mama	2021	Cynthia Erivo	Ch. 1 Vs. 1
Too Little, Too Late, Too Bad	2023	Rhiannon Giddens	You're the One
You're The One	2023	Rhiannon Giddens	You're the One
Yet to Be (feat. Jason Isbell)	2023	Rhiannon Giddens	You're the One
Wrong Kind of Right	2023	Rhiannon Giddens	You're the One
Another Wasted Life	2023	Rhiannon Giddens	You're the One
You Louisiana Man	2023	Rhiannon Giddens	You're the One
If You Don't Know How Sweet It Is	2023	Rhiannon Giddens	You're the One
Hen In The Foxhouse	2023	Rhiannon Giddens	You're the One
Who Are You Dreaming Of	2023	Rhiannon Giddens	You're the One
You Put The Sugar In My Bowl	2023	Rhiannon Giddens	You're the One
Way Over Yonder	2023	Rhiannon Giddens	You're the One
Good Ol' Cider	2023	Rhiannon Giddens	You're the One
