= How Do You Do (Mayer Hawthorne album) =

Studio album by Mayer Hawthorne
- Released: October 11, 2011
- Studio: The Barbershop (Detroit and Los Angeles); Dean Street (London)
- Genre: R&B; soul
- Length: 38:29
- Label: Universal Republic
- Producer: Mayer Hawthorne

Mayer Hawthorne chronology
A Strange Arrangement (2009)	How Do You Do (2011)	Where Does This Door Go (2013)

Singles from How Do You Do
- 1. "A Long Time" Released: May 23, 2011; 2. "The Walk" Released: August 29, 2011

How Do You Do is the second studio album by American singer Mayer Hawthorne. It was released on October 11, 2011, by Universal Republic Records. The limited edition box set of the album gave Hawthorne his first Grammy Award nomination for Best Boxed or Special Limited Edition Package in 2014.

== Singles ==
The album's lead single, "A Long Time", was released on May 23, 2011, its music video was released on September 5, 2011. The album's second single, "The Walk", was released on August 29, 2011, its music video was released on October 5, 2011. The song peaked at number 32 on the US Hot Rock & Alternative Songs and number two on the Adult Alternative Airplay chart.

== Critical reception ==
Professional ratings
Aggregate scores
Source	Rating
AnyDecentMusic?	6.7/10
Metacritic	78/100
Review scores
Source	Rating
AllMusic	4/5 stars
Consequence	C−
Entertainment Weekly	B+
HipHopDX	4.0/5
Los Angeles Times	3.5/4 stars
MSN Music (Consumer Guide)	A−
PopMatters	8/10
Rolling Stone	3/5 stars
Slant Magazine	2.5/5 stars
Spin	8/10

How Do You Do was met with generally positive reviews. At Metacritic, which assigns a normalized rating out of 100 to reviews from professional publications, the album received an average score of 78, based on 19 reviews. Aggregator AnyDecentMusic? gave it 6.7 out of 10, based on their assessment of the critical consensus.

AllMusic editor David Jeffries commented that Hawthorne's songwriting ability compliments his "adherence to an aesthetic" and "love of nostalgic soul", and stated, "that the man sounds more natural and loose than on his debut might be this album's greatest asset, making the vulgar drops and other nods to the present feel less mannered than before". Barry Walters of Spin called Hawthorne a "credible crooner" and commented that "his increasingly confident cries and grooves and songwriting aplomb are undeniably pro". Colin McGuire of PopMatters dubbed it "Hawthorne's masterpiece to date" and stated, "What makes How Do You Do so much better than the singer's debut [...] is his foray into up-tempo groove-happy soul music". Los Angeles Times writer August Brown complimented its "fantastic pillow talk" and wrote that the album "splits the difference between the well-ironed soul revivalism of Adele and R. Kelly's baroquely dirty mind". Brown added that Hawthorne "comes into his own as a vocal powerhouse" and commended the production as "refined and dynamic in a way that's wholly missing from pop radio".

However, Slant Magazine's Jonathan Keefe found Hawthorne's singing "technically poor" and marred by a "shaky sense of pitch". Keefe noted its musicianship as "simply flawless in recreating a '70s-era R&B groove" and stated, "Hawthorne just doesn't have the vocal chops to pull off an otherwise solid album". Rolling Stone writer Chuck Eddy found "Hawthorne's oldschool pop-R&B homages [...] so meticulous that it's tempting to overrate his pipes", and concluded, "Don't expect emotion for the ages, and you'll have fun with this". In his consumer guide, critic Robert Christgau indicating "the kind of garden-variety good record that is the great luxury of musical micromarketing and overproduction". He called the album a "civically revivalist Motown / Ford homage" and stated, "What we're hearing here is the Temptations turning into the Delfonics—the way his midrange gives up the verse and his falsetto takes the chorus is as nice as his boyish sexism".

=== Industry awards ===
Awards and nominations for How Do You Do
Year	Ceremony	Category	Result	Ref.
2014	Grammy Awards	Best Boxed or Special Limited Edition Package	Nominated	

== Track listing ==
All tracks are written by Mayer Hawthorne (Andrew Cohen) except as noted.

How Do You Do track listing
No.	Title	Writer(s)	Length
1.	"Get to Know You"		4:40
2.	"A Long Time"		3:41
3.	"Can't Stop" (featuring Snoop Dogg)	Cohen; Calvin Broadus, Jr.	3:57
4.	"Dreaming"		3:40
5.	"The Walk"		3:38
6.	"Finally Falling"		3:20
7.	"Hooked"		2:32
8.	"Stick Around"		2:57
9.	"The News"		1:37
10.	"You Called Me"		2:32
11.	"You're Not Ready"		3:01
12.	"No Strings"	Cohen; Michael David	3:48

iTunes bonus track
No.	Title	Length
13.	"Henny & Gingerale"	4:14

== Personnel ==
Credits adapted from the album's liner notes.

Musicians

- Mayer Hawthorne – vocals, instruments
- Joseph Abrams – bass (12)
- Hubert Alexander – electric and acoustic piano (6)
- Rebecca Bowman – additional fingersnaps (8)
- Jamall Bufford – additional fingersnaps (8)
- Kenza Chaouai – handclaps (4)
- Dennis Coffey – guitar (8, 11)
- Roman GianArthur – strings (4)
- JimiJames – additional vocals (5, 10)
- Quentin Joseph – drums (6, 12)
- Justin Jozwiak – tenor saxphone (5)
- Stephen Kaye – strings (1, 3)
- Jeffrey Klein – handclaps (4)
- Quincy McCrary – additional piano (4)
- Topher Mohr – guitar (2, 4, 9), additional guitar (7)
- David Moyer – saxophones (1, 3, 7–12), baritone saxophone (5)
- Noelle Scaggs – additional vocals (2)
- Harlan Silverman – guitar (6)
- Todd Simon – trumpet (1, 3, 5, 7–12), flugelhorn (1, 3, 7–11), French horn (3), euphonium (7, 9, 10)
- Snoop Dogg – additional vocals (3)
- Christian Wunderlich – guitar (10)

Production

- Mayer Hawthorne – producer, engineer, mixing (1–11), art direction
- Michael David – additional production (12)
- Jason Schweitzer – mixing (1–11)
- Tom Elmhirst – mixing (12)
- Chris Gehringer – mastering
- Kevin Scanlon – photography
- Robert Winter – photography
- Cedric Bihr – photography
- Henry DeMaio – photography
- Jeff Lank – text
- Chris Piascik – lettering

== Charts ==
=== Weekly charts ===
Chart performance for How Do You Do
Chart (2011)	Peak position
Belgian Heatseekers Albums (Ultratop Flanders)	8
Canadian Albums (Nielsen SoundScan)	96
Dutch Albums (Album Top 100)	70
Dutch Alternative Albums (Alternative Top 30)	26
New Zealand Albums (RMNZ)	28
US Billboard 200	52
US Top R&B/Hip-Hop Albums (Billboard)	8

=== Year-end charts ===
2012 year-end chart performance for How Do You Do
Chart (2012)	Position
US Top R&B/Hip-Hop Albums (Billboard)	82
