= Where Does This Door Go =

Studio album by Mayer Hawthorne
- Released: July 16, 2013
- Genre: Neo soul
- Length: 51:54
- Label: Republic
- Producer: TheAceFace69; Da Internz; Greg Wells; Jack Splash; Jake One; Kid Harpoon; Mayer Hawthorne; Oakwud; Pharrell Williams

Mayer Hawthorne chronology
How Do You Do (2011)	Where Does This Door Go (2013)	Man About Town (2016)

Singles from Where Does This Door Go
- 1. "Her Favorite Song" Released: May 15, 2013

Where Does This Door Go is the third studio album by American singer Mayer Hawthorne. It was released on July 16, 2013, by Republic Records.

== Singles ==
The album's lead single, "Her Favorite Song", was released on May 15, 2013, its music video was released on June 26, 2013.

== Critical reception ==
Professional ratings
Aggregate scores
Source	Rating
AnyDecentMusic?	6.9/10
Metacritic	73/100
Review scores
Source	Rating
AllMusic	3/5 stars
The A.V. Club	B−
Consequence	C+
Exclaim!	8/10
The Guardian	3/5 stars
The Independent	4/5 stars
Los Angeles Times	2/4 stars
Pitchfork	7.1/10
PopMatters	9/10
Rolling Stone	2/5 stars

Where Does This Door Go was met with generally positive reviews. At Metacritic, which assigns a normalized rating out of 100 to reviews from professional publications, the album received an average score of 73, based on 17 reviews. Aggregator AnyDecentMusic? gave it 6.9 out of 10, based on their assessment of the critical consensus.

Michael Gallucci of The A.V. Club stated, "For all of his apparent devotion to the genre, Hawthorne comes off somewhat soulless on Where Does This Door Go". Derek Staples of Consequence stated, "For those awaiting more of Hawthorne's soul revivalism, his new carefree mentality has also had a positive effect on the songwriter's more straightforward soul affairs". Ryan B. Patrick of Exclaim! stated, "With Where Does This Door Go, Hawthorne's falsetto-inflected voice has become more commanding, his production more intriguing and his indie-soul aspirations have morphed into mainstream ambitions". Andy Gill of The Independent stated, "Hawthorne's muse is steeped in '70 influences—notably falsetto and symphonic-soul giants like Curtis Mayfield and Barry White, while trailing threads of piercing lead guitar through songs like "Wine Glass Women" and "Corsican Rose" bring to mind Ernie Isley's work on "Summer Breeze"". Zachary Houle of PopMatters stated, "Where Does This Door Go improves over his last effort, which was already pretty good to begin with, and may go down as one of the year's most exceptional releases. Where Does This Door Go is as refreshing as a tropical breeze, if not a good cup of joe at your favorite hangout".

Nate Patrin of Pitchfork stated, "Inconsistency or complexity? Depends on how much you believe in this music as sincere self-expression versus its status as smartly crafted, artist-as-listener-proxy pop". David Jeffries of AllMusic stated, "Wherever this door does go, it is a place that calls for boat shoes, a relaxed attitude, and a returning fan's patience". Harriet Gibsone of The Guardian stated, "Packed with cleverly crafted production, Where Does This Door Go may be a sonic adventure, but it's not quite slick enough to challenge the current crop of R&B luminaries". August Brown of Los Angeles Times stated, "Where Does This Door Go feels like a once-promising OK Cupid date that's gone off the rails". Mike Powell of Rolling Stone stated, "From modest goals come modest returns".

== Commercial performance ==
Where Does This Door Go debuted at number 30 on the US Billboard 200, and number four on the R&B Albums, selling around 10,000 copies in its first week. It has sold 38,000 copies in the United States as of March 2016.

== Track listing ==
Where Does This Door Go track listing
No.	Title	Writer(s)	Producer(s)	Length
1.	"Problematization"			0:15
2.	"Back Seat Lover"	Andrew Cohen; Marcos Palacios; Ernest Clark; Kevin Randolph; Eric Jackson	Da Internz; Mayer Hawthorne	3:51
3.	"The Innocent"	Cohen; Jack Splash	Splash; Hawthorne	3:22
4.	"Allie Jones"	Cohen; Warren Felder	Oakwud; TheAceFace69; Hawthorne	4:04
5.	"The Only One"	Cohen; Splash	Splash; Hawthorne	3:20
6.	"Wine Glass Woman"	Cohen; Pharrell Williams	Williams	3:47
7.	"Her Favorite Song"	Cohen; Felder	Oakwud; TheAceFace69; Hawthorne^{[a]}	3:43
8.	"Ay Bass Player"			0:14
9.	"Crime" (featuring Kendrick Lamar)	Cohen; Felder; Kendrick Duckworth	Oakwud	4:40
10.	"Reach Out Richard"	Cohen; Williams	Williams	4:08
11.	"Corsican Rosé"	Cohen; Felder	Oakwud; TheAceFace69; Hawthorne	4:08
12.	"Where Does This Door Go"	Cohen	Greg Wells; Hawthorne	4:18
13.	"Robot Love"	Cohen; John Hill; Kid Harpoon; William Curtis	Harpoon; Hawthorne; Hill^{[a]}	3:27
14.	"The Stars Are Ours"	Cohen; Williams	Williams	4:31
15.	"All Better"	Cohen	Wells; Hawthorne	4:20

Deluxe edition (bonus tracks)
No.	Title	Writer(s)	Producer(s)	Length
16.	"Fool"	Harlan Silverman	Hill; Hawthorne	3:07
17.	"Kaila"	Cohen; Splash	Splash	3:57
18.	"Small Clone"	Cohen; Silverman	Wells; Hawthorne	4:00
19.	"Designer Drug"	Cohen; Jacob Dutton; Samuel Wishkoski	Wells; Jake One; Hawthorne	3:33

iTunes deluxe edition (bonus track)
No.	Title	Writer(s)	Producer(s)	Length
16.	"They Don't Know You"	Cohen; Williams	Williams	4:05

Notes

- ^{^[a]} signifies a co-producer

Sample credits

- "Robot Love" contains an interpolation from "Put Your Love (In My Tender Care)", written by William Curtis.

== Personnel ==
Musicians

- Mayer Hawthorne – vocals, drums (3, 13, 15, 18), percussion (3, 13), programming (3), bass guitar (3, 6, 10, 12–15), electric guitar (3, 5, 13), electric piano (3, 15), piano (5, 12, 18), synthesizers (4, 13, 16), records scratches (3, 5, 9, 11), drum fills (10), vibraphone (12, 15), glockenspiel (15), celeste (18), additional electric piano (14)
- Marsha Ambrosius – additional vocals (11)
- Miguel Atwood-Ferguson – string arrangements, violin, and viola (12)
- Sam Beaubien – trumpet (5)
- Alison Bjorkedal – harp (12)
- Jeannette Boling – additional vocals (15)
- Kid Harpoon – mellotron (13)
- John Hill – electric guitar, claps, and drum machine (13)
- Da Internz – drums, programming, and additional background vocals (2)
- Eric Jackson – acoustic guitar (2)
- JimiJames – background vocals (2)
- Quentin Joseph – drums (14)
- Justin Jozwiak – tenor saxophone (5)
- Kendrick Lamar – additional vocals (9)
- James Manning – bass guitar (2)
- Matt Martinez – trombone (5)
- Quincy McCrary – additional electric piano (6)
- Steve "Ace Face" Mostyn – bass guitar (4, 7, 9, 11), electric guitar (4, 7, 9, 11), Yamaha CP70 (4, 7, 9), electric piano (11), synthesizers (4), Turkish saz (9), background vocals (4)
- Oak – drums (4, 7, 9, 11), programming (4, 7, 9, 11), synthesizers (7, 9, 11), background vocals (4)
- Destiny Papalia – additional vocals (13)
- Tricia Parris – skit (5)
- Jackson Perry – additional background vocals (2), additional vocals (15)
- Jason Pipkin – drums (16)
- Kevin Randolph – electric piano and synthesizers (2)
- Josh Remsberg – additional vocals (15)
- Fernanda Repsold – additional background vocals (2)
- Jimetta Rose – additional vocals (6)
- Harlan Silverman – electric guitar (10, 16, 18), electric bass (16, 18), piano (16), Wurlitzer (16, 18), synthesizer (18)
- Shaili Sirpal – additional vocals (15)
- Jack Splash – drums (3, 5), percussion (3), programming (3, 5), synthesizers (5), bass guitar (5), piano (5), additional vocals (3), all instruments (17)
- Rene Toledo – electric guitar (6, 14)
- Karl Tyler – skit (6)
- Chris Votek – cello (12)
- Jessie Ware – additional vocals (7)
- Greg Wells – drums (12, 18), drum machine (15), electric piano (12), acoustic piano (15), mellotron (15), electric guitar (12), electric slide guitar (15)
- Pharrell Williams – drums (6, 10), percussion (6, 10, 14), programming (6), electric piano (6, 14), acoustic piano (10, 14), glockenspiel (14), additional vocals (14)
- Christian Wunderlich – electric guitar (2), bridge guitar (13)

Technical personnel

- Delbert Bowers – mix assistant (2, 6–10, 12, 13)
- Michael H. Brauer – mixing (3–5, 11, 14, 16)
- Chris Galland – mix assistant (2, 6–10, 12, 13)
- Chris Gehringer – mastering
- Ryan Gilligan – mix assistant and Pro Tools engineer (3–5, 11, 14, 16)
- Mayer Hawthorne – mixing (19)
- Manny Marroquin – mixing (2, 6–10, 12, 13)
- Jason Schweitzer – mixing (17, 18)
- Greg Wells – mixing (19)

== Charts ==
Chart performance for Where Does This Door Go
Chart (2013)	Peak position
Belgian Albums (Ultratop Wallonia)	81
Dutch Albums (Album Top 100)	92
German Albums (Offizielle Top 100)	57
US Billboard 200	30
US Top R&B/Hip-Hop Albums (Billboard)	10
