= A Strange Arrangement =

Studio album by Mayer Hawthorne
- Released: September 8, 2009
- Recorded: 2008–2009
- Genre: Neo soul
- Length: 34:42
- Label: Stones Throw Records
- Producer: Mayer Hawthorne

Mayer Hawthorne chronology
A Strange Arrangement (2009)	How Do You Do (2011)

Professional ratings
Aggregate scores
Source	Rating
Metacritic	71/100
Review scores
Source	Rating
Pitchfork Media	6.9/10
AllMusic	4/5 stars
Robert Christgau	(choice cut)

A Strange Arrangement is the debut studio album by American musician Mayer Hawthorne. The album was released on September 8, 2009, by Stones Throw Records. The album debuted at number 147 on the Billboard 200 chart, in the first week of its release.

== Track listing ==
All tracks are written by Mayer Hawthorne, except where noted.

No.	Title	Writer(s)	Length
1.	"Prelude"		0:26
2.	"A Strange Arrangement"		4:16
3.	"Just Ain't Gonna Work Out"		2:30
4.	"Maybe So, Maybe No"	Richard Wylie; Tony Hester	2:58
5.	"Your Easy Lovin' Ain't Pleasin' Nothin'"		3:03
6.	"I Wish It Would Rain"		3:57
7.	"Make Her Mine"		2:41
8.	"One Track Mind"		2:06
9.	"The Ills"		2:49
10.	"Shiny & New"		3:00
11.	"Let Me Know"		3:03
12.	"Green Eyed Love"		3:52

iTunes bonus track
No.	Title	Length
13.	"Love Is Alright"	3:01

== Personnel ==
Musicians

- Mayer Hawthorne – vocals, instruments, horn arrangements
- "Humbucker" Highland – guitar (3, 5)
- Jimmy Yellowstone – guitar (4, 7–9, 12)
- Lawrence Minimal – electric and acoustic piano (2, 4, 6, 7, 9, 10)
- Lynn DeVoe – violin and double bass (6)
- Todd Simon – trumpet (2, 5, 7, 9), horn arrangements
- Sam Beaubien – trumpet (4, 6, 8)
- Matt Rautio – French horn (6)
- Andrew Nichols – baritone saxophone (8)
- David Mayer – tenor saxophone, baritone saxophone, and flute (2, 5, 7, 9, 10), horn arrangements
- Hoagie Haven – flugelhorn (2, 7, 10)
- Sgt. Harvey Pepper – French horn (2, 7, 10)
- Dennard Ellsworth – glockenspiel (2)
- Leon Wolverine – additional bass (7, 11)
- Mbari Thornhill – additional percussion (9)

Technical personnel

- Mayer Hawthorne – producer
- Todd Simon – horn engineer
- Haircut – engineer, mixing
- Joe "Pretzel Sticks" Lambert – mastering
- George Moonglow – executive producer

== Charts ==
Chart (2009)	Peak position
French Albums (SNEP)	134
US Billboard 200	147
US Top R&B/Hip-Hop Albums (Billboard)	55
