= Sylvester Earl Powell =

American singer-songwriter

Earl Powell
- Born: Chicago, Illinois, United States
- Genres: R&B, Pop, Stepping, Soul, Dance, Southern Soul
- Occupations: Songwriter, record producer
- Years active: 1998–present
- Label: Eptone Music Productions

Sylvester "Earl" Powell (born February 23, 1972) most commonly known as Earl Powell, is an American songwriter and record producer. He is the owner of Eptone Music Productions. He produced and co-wrote Jennifer Hudson's song "Stand Up" and co-wrote several songs on Tito Jackson's solo project.

== Credits/Discography ==
=== Songs ===
- Shannon Dooks Do It Again (Do It Again - 2022) Producer
- Raff Pylon Christmas In California featuring Snoop Dogg (2020) Songwriter, Producer
- Ben Pelchat Gravity (2019) Producer
- Earl Powell On The Wings featuring Michael K. Jackson (2018) Songwriter, Producer, Engineer, Mixer
- Public Announcement Let It Go Girl (Already on II: The Return of R&B - 2018) Songwriter, Producer
- Slique Jay Adams Yes (Already on II: The Return of R&B - 2018) Songwriter, Producer
- Latimore Brothers Love Letter (Already on II: The Return of R&B - 2018) Songwriter, Producer
- Matt Hoyles Time Time (Time - 2018) Songwriter, Producer
- Matt Hoyles Medicine Man (Time - 2018) Songwriter, Producer
- Matt Hoyles Redemption City (Time - 2018) Producer
- Tito Jackson Get It Baby featuring Big Daddy Kane (Tito Time - 2016) Songwriter, Producer, Mixer, Engineer
- Tito Jackson One Way Street (Tito Time - 2016) Songwriter, Producer, Mixer, Engineer, Keyboards, Piano
- Tito Jackson On My Way Home (Tito Time - 2016) Songwriter, Producer, Mixer, Engineer
- Tito Jackson Not Afraid (Tito Time - 2016) Songwriter, Producer, Engineer
- Tito Jackson When The Magic Happens (Tito Time - 2016) Songwriter, Producer, Mixer
- Tito Jackson Put It On Me (Tito Time - 2016) Songwriter, Producer, Engineer
- Tito Jackson She Gotta Go (Tito Time - 2016) Mixer
- Tito Jackson Cruisin' (Tito Time - 2016) Mixer
- Tito Jackson T.I.T.O. Love (Tito Time - 2016) Songwriter, Producer, Engineer
- Tito Jackson I Ain’t Goin’ Nowhere (Tito Time - 2016) Mixer
- Keyshia Cole Woman To Woman featuring Ashanti (Woman To Woman - 2012) Producer
- Syleena Johnson Angry Girl (Chapter V: Underrated - 2011) Producer
- Syleena Johnson Champ (Chapter V: Underrated - 2011) ProducerChapter V: Underrated - 2011) Producer
- Syleena Johnson Like Thorns (Chapter V: Underrated - 2011) ProducerChapter V: Underrated - 2011) Producer
- Floyd Taylor All Of You All Of Me (All Of Me - 2010) Producer
- Jennifer Hudson Stand Up (Jennifer Hudson [ Target US, iTunes Japan and UK Versions] - 2008) Producer
- Floyd Taylor What If He Knew (You Still Got It - 2007) Producer
- Floyd Taylor Woman (You Still Got It - 2007) Producer
- Floyd Taylor You Still Got It (You Still Got It - 2007) Producer
- Floyd Taylor If You Catch Me Sleepin (You Still Got It - 2007) Producer
- Strong All I Need (Strong - 1999) Producer
- Strong Frontin (Strong - 1999) Producer
- Strong How Would You Feel (Strong - 1999) Producer
- Strong I Can’t Hide (Strong - 1999) Producer
- Strong I Got What You Need (Strong - 1999) Producer
- Strong I Know (Strong - 1999) Producer
- Strong Lucky Star (Strong - 1999) Producer
- Strong Mi Amiga (Strong - 1999) Producer
- Strong Ready Or Not (Strong - 1999) Producer
- Strong See You Again (Strong - 1999) Producer
- Strong Somethin (Strong - 1999) Producer
- Strong Why Would She Call (Strong - 1999) Producer
- Dejah Changes (Dejah - 1998) Producer
- Dejah Gotta Be Real (Dejah - 1998) Producer
- Dejah Krazy (Dejah - 1998) Producer
- Dejah Say It Ain’t So (Dejah - 1998) Producer
- Dejah Foolin Around (Dejah - 1998) Producer
- Entourage Baby I’m Lonely (Fall Backs Of A Playa - 1998) Producer
- Entourage Come Back Home (Fall Backs Of A Playa - 1998) Producer
- Entourage Don’t Stop This Feeling (Fall Backs Of A Playa - 1998) Producer
- Entourage Here With Me (Fall Backs Of A Playa - 1998) Producer
- Entourage Making Love (Fall Backs Of A Playa - 1998) Producer
- Entourage When (Fall Backs Of A Playa - 1998) Producer
- Entourage Why Did You (Fall Backs Of A Playa - 1998) Producer

=== Albums ===
- Matt Hoyles (Time - 2018)
- (Already On II: The Return of R&B - 2018)
- Tito Jackson (Tito Time - 2016) Songwriter, Producer, Engineer
- Strong (Mi Amiga [CD5 / Cassette Single] - 1999) Producer
- Strong (Strong - 1999) Producer, Engineer, Vocal Arrangement, Narrator, Trumpet
- Alfonzo Hunter (Blacka Da Berry - 1996) Engineer
- Johnny P. (Next - 1998) Programming, Associate Producer
- Entourage (Fall Backs of a Playa - 1998) Producer, Vocal Arrangement, Drum Programming, Engineer, Keyboard Programming
- Entourage (Page Me Remix - 1998) Producer, Engineer, Remixing, Drum Programming, Keyboard Programming
- Dejah (Dejah - 1998) Vocal Arrangement, Engineer, Producer, Keyboard Programming

=== TV and film ===
- ''(Mis)Leading Man'' ''(Best Short Film in Hollywood)'' – Composer
- ''Nothing like the Holidays'' (Debra Messing, John Leguizamo) – Composer
- ''The Truth (II)'' Hill Harper ''(CSI New York)'' directorial debut – Composer
- ''Of Boys And Men'' (Angela Bassett, Robert Townsend) – Composer
