= I Ain't Thru =

Single by Keyshia Cole featuring Nicki Minaj

from the album Calling All Hearts
- Released: December 7, 2010
- Genre: Hip hop; R&B
- Length: 3:59
- Label: Imani; Geffen
- Songwriters: Keyshia Cole; Russell Gonzalez; Onika Maraj
- Producers: The ARE; Ron Fair

Keyshia Cole singles chronology
"Trust" (2009)	"I Ain't Thru" (2010)	"Take Me Away" (2011)

Nicki Minaj singles chronology
"Monster" (2010)	"I Ain't Thru" (2010)	"Raining Men" (2010)

"I Ain't Thru" is a song by American singer Keyshia Cole. It features Nicki Minaj rapping the second verse of the song. Written by Cole, Minaj and Russell Gonzalez, the up-tempo hip hop/R&B song is the lead single taken from Cole's fourth studio album Calling All Hearts (2010). The song's lyrics revolve around Cole trying to do her own thing well while maintaining ignorance toward people who are against her. It was produced by The ARE and Ron Fair as Cole's 'statement record'.

It was released for download in the United States on December 7, 2010. "I Ain't Thru" was described by critics as the most grit-flecked Cole has ever sounded. It was moderately successful across the airplay formats as it debuted on the US Hot R&B/Hip-Hop Songs chart at number 78 on November 18, 2010. In subsequent weeks, the single peaked at number 54. An accompanying music video for "I Ain't Thru", directed by Benny Boom, was premiered on November 12, 2010 alongside the music video for follow-up single "Long Way Down".

== Background and meaning ==
Cole described "I Ain't Thru" as a "statement single". During an interview with Associated Press, Cole admitted that she should not have released 'I Ain't Thru' as the lead single. She stated, "The label didn't really want to drop the record because they knew … that people wanted a more intense, soulful record from me about love and I really should have followed (their) direction," she said. "But I wanted that to be a statement record. It's like saying, 'I'm doing me, you know. I don't have no regrets for nothing that I'm doing.'" Some speculate that Minaj's verse in the song is a diss at Lil' Kim, with lines like "I took the spot, she's gone, poof!" being subliminally directed at the rapper.

== Music video ==
The video premiered on November 12, 2010. The production of the video was shot in Los Angeles. The visual was overseen by Benny Boom.

== Track listing and formats ==
US standard digital download

1. "I Ain't Thru" (Featuring Nicki Minaj) (Clean or Explicit) - 3:59

US and Canadian Mega-Deluxe EP

1. "I Ain't Thru" (Explicit Version featuring Nicki Minaj) - 3:59
2. "I Ain't Thru" (Clean Version featuring Nicki Minaj) - 3:59
3. "I Ain't Thru" (Explicit Leak Mix featuring Nicki Minaj) - 4:04
4. "I Ain't Thru" (Clean Leak Mix featuring Nicki Minaj) - 4:04
5. "I Ain't Thru" (Video) - 4:08

== Charts ==
Chart (2011)	Peak position
Netherlands (Urban Top 100)	28
US Bubbling Under Hot 100 (Billboard)	19
US Hot R&B/Hip-Hop Songs (Billboard)	54

== Release history ==
List of release dates, record label and format details
Country	Date	Format	Label
United States	December 7, 2010	Digital download	Geffen
