= Man About Town (album) =

Studio album by Mayer Hawthorne
- Released: April 8, 2016
- Studio: The Barbershop (Paris and Los Angeles); Base (Melbourne); The Village (Los Angeles)
- Length: 34:02
- Label: BMG; Vagrant
- Producer: Mayer Hawthorne; Benny Sings; Bram Inscore; Jack Splash

Mayer Hawthorne chronology
Where Does This Door Go (2013)	Man About Town (2016)	Rare Changes (2020)

Singles from Man About Town
- 1. "Cosmic Love" Released: January 14, 2016

Man About Town is the fourth studio album by American singer Mayer Hawthorne. It was released on April 8, 2016, by BMG Rights Management and Vagrant Records.

== Singles ==
The album's lead single, "Cosmic Love", was released on January 14, 2016, its music video was released on February 11, 2016.

== Critical reception ==
Professional ratings
Aggregate scores
Source	Rating
AnyDecentMusic?	6.4/10
Metacritic	74/100
Review scores
Source	Rating
AllMusic	3.5/5 stars
Exclaim!	7/10
The Guardian	3/5 stars
The Irish Times	3/5 stars
PopMatters	7/10
Record Collector	4/5 stars
Uncut	8/10

Man About Town was met with generally positive reviews. At Metacritic, which assigns a normalized rating out of 100 to reviews from mainstream publications, the album received an average score of 74, based on eight reviews. Aggregator AnyDecentMusic? gave it 6.4 out of 10, based on their assessment of the critical consensus.

Mark Deming of AllMusic said, "Man About Town doesn't boast much in the way of radical steps forward. But it confirms the man is still very good at what he does". Ken Capobianco of The Boston Globe said, "Highlights album come when the songs stretch beyond Hawthorne's solo comfort zone". Mackenzie Herd of Exclaim! said, "There is an invigorating energy that shines through the lyrics and tempo of this album, so although lyrics about the finer things of California living aren't necessarily profound or entirely relatable, on Man About Town, Hawthorne's buoyant optimism for beginning anew in 2016 is utterly contagious".

Colin McGuire of PopMatters said, "Like it or not, there aren't many people who can pull off what Mayer Hawthorne does best these days as well as Mayer Hawthorne does it. It fills a very real void in an increasingly crowded and grossly jaded pop music world. It is, in essence, important work". Charles Waring of Record Collector said, "Containing 10 songs and with a running time of 30 minutes, it's tantalisingly brief but never short of quality". Rachel Aroesti of The Guardian said, "For the most part, he remains in relatively banal lyrical territory on this fourth album, but what he's able to do with some aplomb is capture the majestic effortlessness of the Motown sound".

== Track listing ==
All tracks are produced by Mayer Hawthorne, except where noted.

Man About Town track listing
No.	Title	Writer(s)	Producer(s)	Length
1.	"Man About Town"	Andrew Cohen		0:41
2.	"Cosmic Love"	Cohen; Timothy Berkestijn	Hawthorne; Benny Sings	3:13
3.	"Book of Broken Hearts"	Cohen		3:34
4.	"Breakfast in Bed"	Cohen		4:07
5.	"Lingerie & Candlewax"	Cohen; Vito De Luca		3:37
6.	"Fancy Clothes"	Cohen		4:10
7.	"The Valley"	Cohen; Dave Tozer		3:36
8.	"Love Like That"	Cohen; Bram Inscore	Hawthorne; Inscore	4:06
9.	"Get You Back"	Cohen; Jack Splash	Hawthorne; Splash	3:36
10.	"Out of Pocket"	Cohen; Inscore	Hawthorne; Inscore	3:22
Total length:				34:02

== Personnel ==
Credits adapted from the album's liner notes.

- Mayer Hawthorne – vocals, drums (2–6, 8), drum programming (7, 9, 10), bass guitar (2–6), guitar (2–6, 8), synthesizers (2), Wurlitzer (3, 6), Fender Rhodes (4), ARP Pro solo (5, 8), Yamaha SY-2 (8), Yamaha CP-70 (9), vibraphone (3–5), glockenspiel (5), marimba (6), hand claps (7, 8), cabasa (7), tambourine (7), string arrangements (5, 9), mixing, mastering, art direction
- Joe Abrams – bass guitar (7)
- Hubert Alexander – Yamaha CP-70 (3, 5, 7), Fender Rhodes (7)
- Ambroise Aubrun – violin (9)
- Sam Beaubien – trumpet (3, 5, 6, 10)
- Benny Sings – organ and pianet (2)
- Ben Bartelt – viola (9)
- Lola Delon – additional vocals (2, 3, 5, 6, 8)
- Rhea Fowler – violin (9)
- Gerald Glecer – guitar (9)
- Jim Hocker – trumpet (9)
- Bram Inscore – drums (10), bass guitar (8, 10), guitar (10), Wurlitzer (8, 10), Crumar orchestrator (10), mixing (10)
- Jimi James – additional vocals (2, 3, 5–9)
- Quentin Joseph – drums (7)
- Justin Jozwick – saxophone (3, 5, 6, 10)
- Matt Martinez – trombone (3, 5, 6, 10)
- Lasim Richards – trombone (9)
- Jimetta Rose – additional vocals (7)
- Harlan Silverman – cello (9)
- Jack Splash – drums, bass guitar, and string arrangements (9)
- Juan Turros – saxophone (9)
- Sam Wishkowski – string arrangements (4)
- Christian Wunderlich – guitar solo (6), guitars (7), lead guitar (8)

== Charts ==
Chart performance for Man About Town
Chart (2016)	Peak position
Japanese Albums (Oricon)	61
US Billboard 200	90
US Top R&B/Hip-Hop Albums (Billboard)	6
