= Take Me Away (Keyshia Cole song) =

Single by Keyshia Cole

from the album Calling All Hearts
- Released: February 1, 2011
- Recorded: 2010
- Genre: Dance-pop; R&B
- Length: 3:47
- Label: Geffen
- Songwriters: Keyshia Cole, Teray Jones
- Producer: Chink Santana

Keyshia Cole singles chronology
"I Ain't Thru" (2010)	"Take Me Away" (2011)	"Legendary" (2011)

"Take Me Away" is a song recorded by American singer Keyshia Cole. It serves as the second and last single on her fourth studio album Calling All Hearts.

== Music video ==
The music video was shot and directed by Taj Stansberry. On April 18, 2011, the video was premiered on VEVO and later on 106 & Park.

== Background ==
The song was chosen as the second single from her album based on a fan composed poll. It went for adds at U.S. radio on February 1, 2011, and was officially released on April 12, 2011. Cole performed the song on Conan on January 19, 2011, after releasing Manny Haley from her management team and before the urban radio release on February 1, 2011, and official release on April 22, 2011.

== Charts ==
Chart (2011)	Peak position
Netherlands (Urban Top 100)	35
US Bubbling Under Hot 100 (Billboard)	20
US Hot R&B/Hip-Hop Songs (Billboard)	27
