= Elijah Blake =

Haitian-Dominican American singer

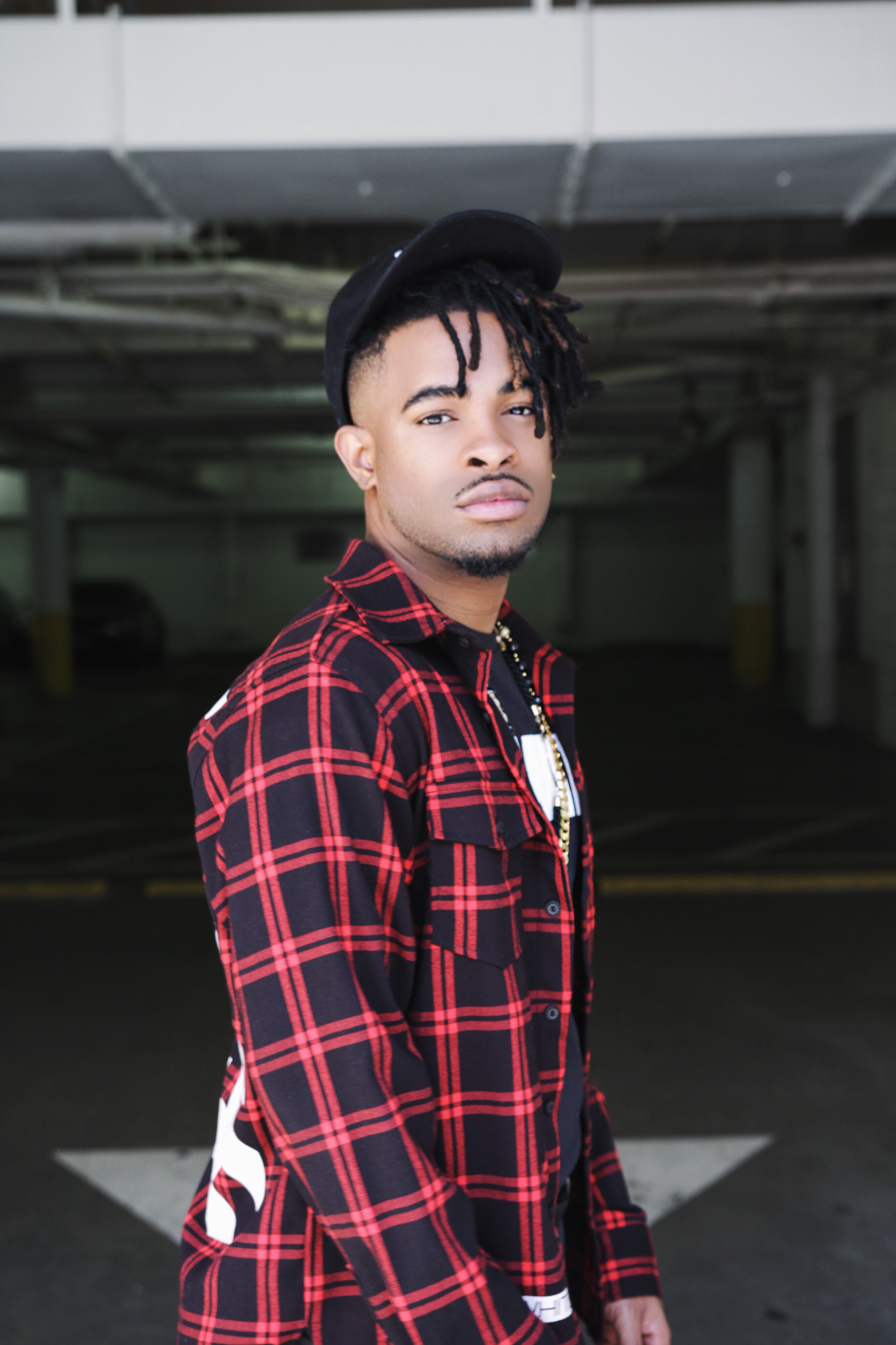
- Elijah Blake at 2016 Photo Series

Background information
- Also known as: Redd Stylez
- Born: Sean Fenton; June 4, 1992 (age 34); Dominican Republic
- Genre: Alternative R&B
- Occupations: Singer; songwriter; record producer
- Instrument: Vocals
- Years active: 2009–present
- Labels: Def Jam; ARTium

Sean Fenton (born June 4, 1992), better known by the stage name Elijah Blake, is a Haitian-Dominican singer, songwriter and record producer. He wrote songs for Keyshia Cole, Rick Ross, Rihanna, and co-wrote Usher's number-one R&B hit, "Climax".

At age 16, Blake signed with Atlantic Records and worked with Trey Songz on his 2009 album, Ready. His debut mixtape, Bijoux 22 (2012), contained the single "X.O.X" (featuring Common). In 2014, he released his debut extended play, Drift.

He signed with Def Jam Recordings and No I.D.'s ARTium Recordings to release his 2015 single, "I Just Wanna", which preceded his debut studio album, Shadows & Diamonds. He released his collaborative extended play, 1990 Forever (2019), with fellow R&B singer Jordin Sparks.

== Early life ==
Blake was born in the Dominican Republic and raised in Florida by a Haitian father and Dominican mother.

== Discography ==
- Bijoux 22 (2012)
- Drift (2014)
- Shadows & Diamonds (2015)
- Blueberry Vapors (2016)
- Audiology (2017)
- Bijoux 23 (2018)
- 1990 Forever (2019)
- Holiday Love (2019)
- The Neon Eon (2021)
- elijah. (2024)
- THE GEMINI (2026)

== Songwriting credits ==
Year	Artist	Album	Title(s)
2012	Usher	Looking 4 Myself	"Climax"
2012	Nas	Life is Good	"Roses"
2012	Rick Ross	God Forgives, I Don't	"Presidential", feat. Elijah Blake
2012	JLS	Evolution	"Dessert"
2012	Rihanna	Unapologetic	"No Love Allowed"
2012	Keyshia Cole	Woman to Woman	"Enough of No Love", feat. Lil Wayne
2012	Keyshia Cole	Woman to Woman	"Missing Me"
2012	Keyshia Cole	Woman to Woman	"Wonderland ft Elijah Blake"
2012	Keyshia Cole	Woman to Woman	"I Choose You"
2012	Keyshia Cole	Woman to Woman	"Stubborn"
2013	Ciara	Ciara	"DUI"
2014	TVXQ	Spellbound	"Heaven's Day (Max Changmin solo)"
2014	Keyshia Cole	Point of No Return	"N.L.U. ft 2 Chainz"
2014	Keyshia Cole	Point of No Return	"Rick James"
2014	Keyshia Cole	Point of No Return	"She"
2014	Selah Sue	Reason	"Alone"
2015	Vince Staples	Summertime '06	"Señiorita"
2016	Jussie Smollett	Empire: Original Soundtrack Season 2 Volume 2	"Freedom"
2018	Christina Aguilera	—N/a	"Need Your Love" (unreleased)
2018	Mario	Dancing Shadows	"Dancing Shadows"
2018	Mario	Dancing Shadows	"Good Times ft Buddy Guy"
2021	Jojo	Trying Not to Think About It	"Feel Alright"
