= Mayer Hawthorne =

American singer-songwriter and audio engineer

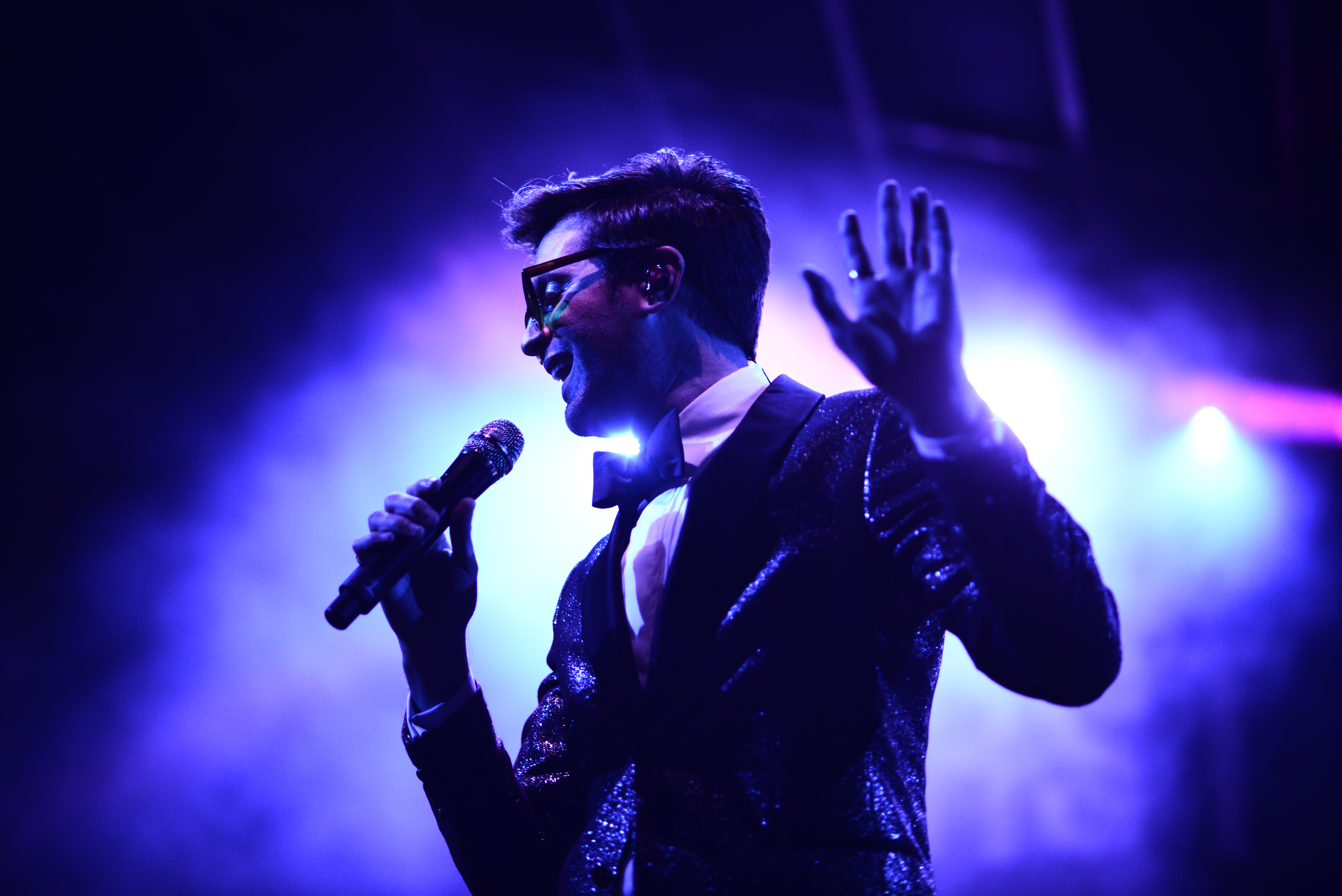
- Cohen performing in 2018

Background information
- Also known as: Tuxedo, DJ Haircut, Haircut, D.Techtive
- Born: Andrew Mayer Cohen; February 2, 1979 (age 47)
- Origin: Ann Arbor, Michigan, U.S.
- Genres: Soul; funk; neo soul; retro-soul
- Occupations: Singer; record producer; songwriter; arranger; audio engineer; disc jockey; multi-instrumentalist
- Instruments: Vocals, various
- Years active: 2008–present
- Labels: Vagrant; Universal Republic; Stones Throw
- Website: www.mayerhawthorne.com

Andrew Mayer Cohen (born February 2, 1979), better known by his stage name Mayer Hawthorne, is an American singer, producer, songwriter, arranger, audio engineer, DJ, and multi-instrumentalist based in Los Angeles, California. Cohen performs and records in the groups Tuxedo and Jaded Incorporated and has been nominated for a Grammy award.

== Early life, family and education ==
Cohen was raised in Ann Arbor, Michigan. His father plays in a band in Detroit, Michigan. The stage name "Mayer Hawthorne" is a combination of Cohen's real middle name (Mayer) and Hawthorne Road, the street he grew up on. Cohen is Jewish and had a bar mitzvah in 1992 at Temple Beth Emeth in Ann Arbor.

== Career ==
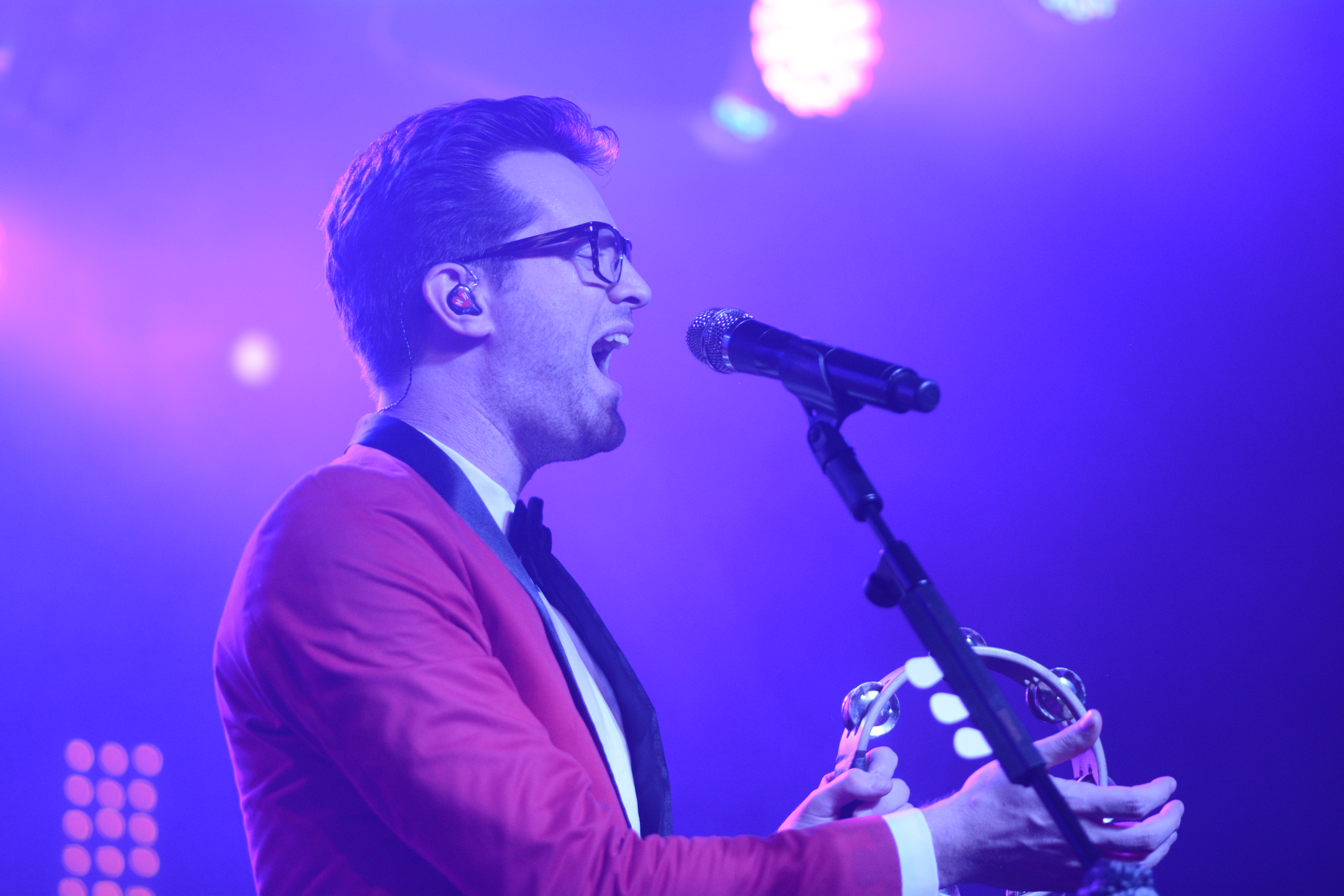
Mayer Hawthorne and The County performing at The Teragram Ballroom in Los Angeles on January 18, 2016

Hawthorne was a member of the group Athletic Mic League (as DJ Haircut), based in Ann Arbor and subsequently relocated to Los Angeles, California, in 2005. He was signed to Stones Throw Records by label head Peanut Butter Wolf. Originally the Mayer Hawthorne tracks were created for sampling purposes and for pleasure. Hawthorne stated that, when working as a hip-hop DJ, he began recording his own Motown-style tracks to avoid paying fees for sampling other artists' work. He sang and played all the instruments on those tracks. However, upon hearing them, Peanut Butter Wolf insisted they be made into an album. Hawthorne had no previous vocal training.

His debut single, "Just Ain't Gonna Work Out"/"When I Said Goodbye", was released on a red heart-shaped 7" record on Stones Throw Records on November 4, 2008. His second single "Maybe So, Maybe No"/"I Wish It Would Rain" was released on a 12" record on Stones Throw Records on April 19, 2009. His debut album A Strange Arrangement was released on CD and LP on Stones Throw Records on September 8, 2009.

The song "When I Said Goodbye", was featured in the Kanye West/Spike Jonze short film We Were Once a Fairytale. In 2011, Hawthorne performed guest vocals for the Sebastian song "Love in Motion", featured on Sebastian's 2011 album Total. Also in 2011, Mayer Hawthorne was a guest, along with Memphis Stax Records keyboardist Booker T. Jones, on Daryl Hall's Live From Daryl's House webcast. They performed with Hall's house band on "Strange Arrangement", "Green Onions", "No Strings", "Just Ain't Gonna Work Out", and "Your Easy Lovin' Ain't Pleasin' Nothin'" and Hall's "You Make My Dreams" and "Private Eyes".

Mayer Hawthorne was a musical guest on the Conan TV show on October 17, 2011, and the Late Show with David Letterman on October 25, 2011. On both shows, the group performed "The Walk", his first single from How Do You Do. In 2012, Hawthorne released the six-track live EP KCRW's Morning Becomes Eclectic, as a part of Record Store Day's Black Friday.

In late May 2013, Hawthorne released his single "Her Favorite Song" from his album Where Does This Door Go. It is noted that the album is a departure from his throwback style in his past two albums. Later that year, he received a Grammy nomination for "Best Boxed or Special Limited Edition Package" for his album How Do You Do.

== Musical influences ==
Mayer Hawthorne is influenced by the music of Curtis Mayfield, Isaac Hayes, Leroy Hutson, Mike Terry, Barry White, Steely Dan, Smokey Robinson and the songwriting and production trio Holland–Dozier–Holland. Taking umbrage at the notion that his is a purely "throwback" soul sound, however, Hawthorne also cites more contemporary artists, such as J Dilla, Hanne Hukkelberg, and Santigold, as significant influences.

Discussing How Do You Do, Hawthorne stated, "I found my own unique sound on this album...." The album's vintage sound, which involves twelve 1970s-inspired tracks is filled with orchestral pop and funky bass lines. "I've taken what I can from the classic heroes of soul and updated it with the music I grew up listening to and loving like Public Enemy and Juan Atkins and Cybotron," he explained.

== In other media ==
In July 2009, Hawthorne was featured on the cover of the third anniversary issue of Beyond Race magazine.

Hawthorne's song "Your Easy Lovin' Ain't Pleasin' Nothin'" was included in the fourth season of Ugly Betty in its finale episode, "Hello Goodbye". His track "Do It", released under the alias 'Tuxedo' with Jake One, is sampled on Pitbull's track of the same name from his 2013 studio album Global Warming.

The title track of Hawthorne's album Where Does This Door Go was featured over the closing credits of the season one Masters of Sex episode "Thank You for Coming" in October 2013, and in season two of Netflix's Dear White People during the closing credits of "Chapter VII".

"Love Like That" is included in the video game Forza Horizon 3.

An excerpt of "The Walk" was used in a Blue Moon beer TV commercial in 2017, and in Season 4 episode 10 of the Fox television series Fringe.

"Just Ain't Gonna Work Out" was featured in a scene of the Girls episode "All Adventurous Women Do" (2012).

== Discography ==
=== as Mayer Hawthorne ===
- A Strange Arrangement (2009)
- How Do You Do (2011)
- Where Does This Door Go (2013)
- Man About Town (2016)
- Rare Changes (2020)
- For All Time (2023)

=== as Tuxedo ===
- Tuxedo (2015)
- Tuxedo II (2017)
- Tuxedo III (2019)
- Tuxedo IV (2024)

=== as Jaded Incorporated ===
- The Big Knock (2014)
