= Billboard Year-End Hot Rap Singles of 1999 =

American music chart

This is a list of Billboard magazine's Top Hot Rap Singles of 1999.

No.	Title	Artist(s)
1	"Who Dat"	JT Money featuring Solé
2	"What's It Gonna Be?!"	Busta Rhymes featuring Janet Jackson
3	"Somebody Like Me" / "It Ain't My Fault 2"	Silkk the Shocker featuring Mya
4	"Ghetto Cowboy"	Mo Thugs featuring Bone Thugs-n-Harmony
5	"No Pigeons"	Sporty Thievz
6	"Jamboree"	Naughty by Nature featuring Zhané
7	"Holla Holla"	Ja Rule
8	"Watch for the Hook"	Cool Breeze featuring Outkast, Goodie Mob and Witchdoctor
9	"I Want It All"	Warren G featuring Mack 10
10	"Hard Knock Life (Ghetto Anthem)"	Jay-Z
11	"Satisfy You"	Puff Daddy featuring R. Kelly
12	"Doo Wop (That Thing)"	Lauryn Hill
13	"Pushin' Weight"	Ice Cube featuring Mr. Short Khop
14	"Wild Wild West"	Will Smith featuring Dru Hill and Kool Moe Dee
15	"Woof"	Snoop Dogg featuring Fiend and Mystikal
16	"Watch Out Now"	The Beatnuts
17	"More Freaky Tales"	Too Short
18	"Jigga My Nigga"	Jay-Z
19	"Let Me Know"	Cam'ron
20	"Nann Nigga"	Trick Daddy featuring Trina
21	"4, 5, 6"	Solé featuring JT Money and Kandi
22	"One-Nine-Nine-Nine"	Common featuring Sadat X
23	"Players Holiday"	T.W.D.Y featuring Too Short and Mac Mall
24	"It's Your Thing"	Mercedes featuring Master P
25	"U-Way (How We Do It)"	YoungBloodZ
26	"Nas Is Like"	Nas
27	"Simon Says"	Pharoahe Monch
28	"Respiration"	Black Star featuring Common
29	"Just Don't Give a Fuck"	Eminem
30	"What'cha Wanna Do"	Mia X featuring Charlie Wilson
31	"Who Let the Dogs Out"	Chuck Smooth
32	"Nasty Trick"	Gangsta Boo
33	"Here I Go"	Infamous Syndicate
34	"Invasion of the Flat Booty Bitches"	Too Short
35	"The Real One"	2 Live Crew featuring Ice-T
36	"Money's Just a Touch Away"	Mack 10 featuring Gerald Levert
37	"Stand Up"	Charli Baltimore featuring Ghostface Killah
38	"Automatic"	MC Eiht
39	"B-Boy Document '99"	The High & Mighty featuring Mos Def and Mad Skillz
40	"Step to This"	Master P featuring D.I.G.
41	"Tru Homies"	TRU
42	"We Be Puttin' It Down"	Bad Azz featuring Snoop Dogg
43	"Come Get It"	DJ Hurricane featuring Rah Digga, Rampage and Lord Have Mercy
44	"Superthug"	Noreaga
45	"Gangsta! Gangsta! (How U Do It)"	Chris Webber featuring Kurupt
46	"PHD (Playa Hata Degree)"	Tony-O featuring Kevin Gardner and Redwine
47	"Better Days"	WC featuring Jon B.
48	"Play Around"	Lil' Cease featuring Lil' Kim, Joe Hooker and Mr. Bristal
49	"Don't Let It Go to Your Head"	Brand Nubian
50	"Big Mama (Go Big Girl)"	Black Dave

== See also ==
- 1999 in music
- Billboard Year-End Hot 100 singles of 1999
- Billboard Year-End Hot R&B/Hip-Hop Singles & Tracks of 1999
- List of Billboard number-one rap singles of 1999
