= Billboard Year-End Hot R&B/Hip-Hop Singles & Tracks of 1999 =

American music chart

This is a list of Billboard magazine's Top Hot R&B/Hip-Hop Singles & Tracks of 1999.

No.	Title	Artist(s)
1	"Fortunate"	Maxwell
2	"Nobody's Supposed to Be Here"	Deborah Cox
3	"Heartbreak Hotel"	Whitney Houston featuring Faith Evans and Kelly Price
4	"No Scrubs"	TLC
5	"Bills, Bills, Bills"	Destiny's Child
6	"Where My Girls At?"	702
7	"You"	Jesse Powell
8	"What's It Gonna Be?!"	Busta Rhymes featuring Janet Jackson
9	"Happily Ever After"	Case
10	"If You (Lovin' Me)"	Silk
11	"Chanté's Got a Man"	Chanté Moore
12	"Ex-Factor"	Lauryn Hill
13	"Sweet Lady"	Tyrese
14	"Spend My Life with You"	Eric Benét featuring Tamia
15	"Faded Pictures"	Case and Joe
16	"Angel of Mine"	Monica
17	"808"	Blaque
18	"Who Dat"	JT Money featuring Solé
19	"Anywhere"	112
20	"Love Like This"	Faith Evans
21	"All Night Long"	Faith Evans featuring Puff Daddy
22	"When a Woman's Fed Up"	R. Kelly
23	"We Can't Be Friends"	Deborah Cox and RL
24	"So Anxious"	Ginuwine
25	"Never Gonna Let You Go"	Faith Evans
26	"Get Gone"	Ideal
27	"Back That Azz Up"	Juvenile featuring Mannie Fresh and Lil Wayne
28	"Trippin'"	Total featuring Missy Elliott
29	"These Are the Times"	Dru Hill
30	"Holla Holla"	Ja Rule
31	"Vivrant Thing"	Q-Tip
32	"Tell Me It's Real"	K-Ci & JoJo
33	"My Love Is Your Love"	Whitney Houston
34	"Did You Ever Think"	R. Kelly
35	"Can I Get A..."	Jay-Z featuring Ja Rule and Amil
36	"Heartbreaker"	Mariah Carey featuring Jay-Z
37	"It's Not Right but It's Okay"	Whitney Houston
38	"What Ya Want"	Eve featuring Nokio
39	"Have You Ever?"	Brandy
40	"Doo Wop (That Thing)"	Lauryn Hill
41	"I Still Believe" / "Pure Imagination"	Mariah Carey
42	"U Know What's Up"	Donell Jones
43	"Jamboree"	Naughty by Nature featuring Zhané
44	"Jigga My Nigga"	Jay-Z
45	"You Got Me"	The Roots featuring Erykah Badu and Eve
46	"If You Had My Love"	Jennifer Lopez
47	"When I Close My Eyes"	Shanice
48	"All That I Can Say"	Mary J. Blige
49	"No Pigeons"	Sporty Thievz
50	"Lately"	Tyrese
51	"It Ain't My Fault"	Silkk the Shocker
52	"Taking Everything"	Gerald Levert
53	"Hard Knock Life (Ghetto Anthem)"	Jay-Z
54	"Georgy Porgy"	Eric Benét featuring Faith Evans
55	"Life"	K-Ci & JoJo
56	"My Favorite Girl"	Dave Hollister
57	"Unpretty"	TLC
58	"Lately"	Divine
59	"Satisfy You"	Puff Daddy featuring R. Kelly
60	"It's All About You (Not About Me)"	Tracie Spencer
61	"Wild Wild West"	Will Smith featuring Dru Hill and Kool Moe Dee
62	"Everything Is Everything"	Lauryn Hill
63	"Beauty"	Dru Hill
64	"If I Could Turn Back the Hands of Time"	R. Kelly
65	"Sitting Home"	Total
66	"I'm Your Angel"	R. Kelly and Celine Dion
67	"Nann Nigga"	Trick Daddy featuring Trina
68	"All n My Grill"	Missy Elliott featuring Big Boi and Nicole Wray
69	"Meeting in My Bedroom"	Silk
70	"Back at One"	Brian McKnight
71	"Bling Bling"	B.G. featuring Hot Boys and Big Tymers
72	"Gotta Man"	Eve
73	"Almost Doesn't Count"	Brandy
74	"I'm Not Ready"	Keith Sweat
75	"How Deep Is Your Love"	Dru Hill
76	"What'd You Come Here For?"	Trina & Tamara
77	"I Want It All"	Warren G featuring Mack 10
78	"Ha"	Juvenile
79	"15 Minutes"	Marc Nelson
80	"Girl's Best Friend"	Jay-Z
81	"Bug a Boo"	Destiny's Child
82	"What's So Different?"	Ginuwine
83	"Watch for the Hook"	Cool Breeze featuring Outkast, Goodie Mob and Witchdoctor
84	"Sunshine"	Coko
85	"Love Me"	112 featuring Mase
86	"Ghetto Cowboy"	Mo Thugs Family featuring Bone Thugs-n-Harmony
87	"Girlfriend/Boyfriend"	Blackstreet and Janet Jackson featuring Ja Rule and Eve
88	"Get Involved"	Raphael Saadiq and Q-Tip
89	"One More Try"	Divine
90	"Hate Me Now"	Nas featuring Puff Daddy
91	"Love You Like I Did"	112
92	"You Are Everything"	Dru Hill
93	"Jigga What, Jigga Who"	Jay-Z featuring Big Jaz
94	"Hold Me"	Brian McKnight
95	"Changes"	2Pac
96	"Angel in Disguise"	Brandy
97	"Quiet Storm"	Mobb Deep
98	"Bitch Please"	Snoop Dogg featuring Xzibit and Nate Dogg
99	"All the Places (I Will Kiss You)"	Aaron Hall
100	"My First Night with You"	Mya

== See also ==
- 1999 in music
- Billboard Year-End Hot 100 singles of 1999
- Billboard Year-End Hot Rap Singles of 1999
- List of Hot R&B Singles & Tracks number ones of 1999
