= List of Billboard number-one rap singles of the 1980s and 1990s =

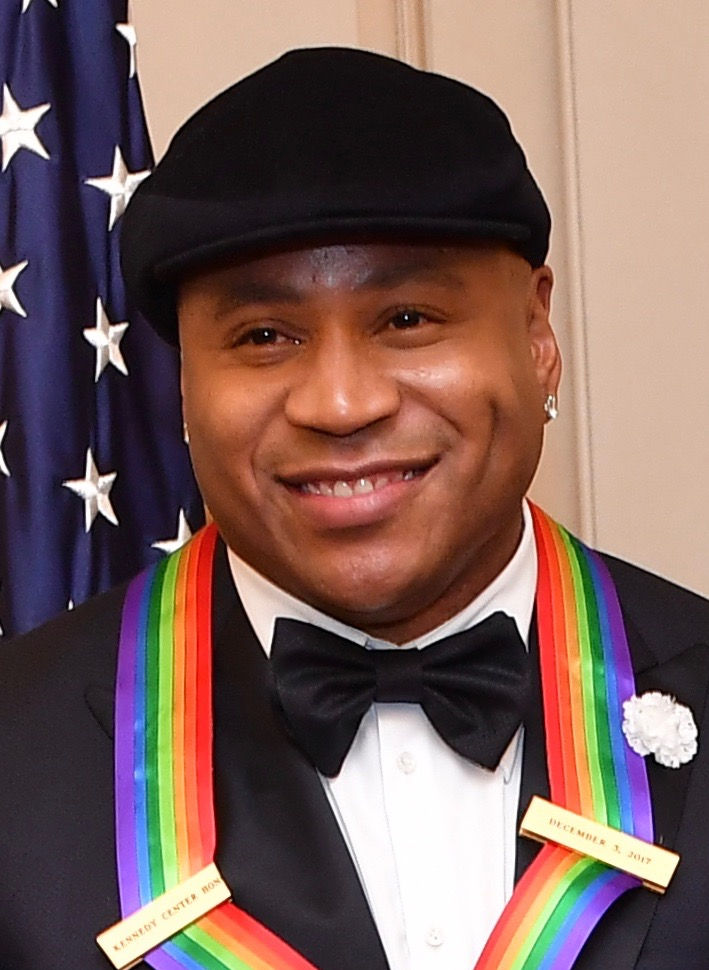
With nine number-one hits attained in the 1980s and 1990s, LL Cool J emerged as one of the most successful artists on the Billboard rap chart.

Hot Rap Songs is a record chart published by the music industry magazine Billboard which ranks the most popular hip hop songs in the United States. With hip hop having greatly increased in mainstream popularity in the late 1980s, Billboard introduced the chart in their March 11, 1989 issue under the name Hot Rap Singles. Prior to the addition of the chart, hip hop music had been profiled in the magazine's "The Rhythm & the Blues" column and disco-related sections, while some rap records made appearances on the related Hot Black Singles chart. The inaugural number-one single on Hot Rap Singles was "Self Destruction" by the Stop the Violence Movement. From its 1989 inception until 2001, the chart was based solely on each single's weekly sales. To formulate chart rankings, Billboard assembled a panel of selected record stores to provide reports of each week's top-selling singles.

Between 1989 and 1999, 173 singles topped the Hot Rap Singles chart, with "Hot Boyz" by Missy Elliott featuring Nas, Eve and Q-Tip being the final number-one single of the 1990s. The single's 18-week reign at the top spot extended into the next decade, and until 2019 it held the record for the most weeks at number one in the chart's history. LL Cool J and Puff Daddy each attained nine number-one hits on the Hot Rap Singles chart during its first 11 years, the most for any artist during this period. In a 25th anniversary listing of the top 100 songs in the history of Hot Rap Songs based on chart performance, "Me So Horny" by the 2 Live Crew and "Tootsee Roll" by 69 Boyz were the highest-ranked singles of the 1980s and 1990s respectively.

== Number-one singles ==
Key
†	Billboard year-end number-one single
↑	Return of a single to number one

Single	Artist	Reached number one	Weeks at number one	Ref.
"Self-Destruction" †	Stop the Violence Movement	March 11, 1989	10	
"Me Myself and I"	De La Soul	May 20, 1989	8	
"I'm That Type of Guy"	LL Cool J	July 15, 1989	2	
"Fight the Power"	Public Enemy	July 29, 1989	6	
"It's Funky Enough"	The D.O.C.	September 9, 1989	4	
"Smooth Operator"	Big Daddy Kane	October 7, 1989	4	
"Me So Horny"	2 Live Crew	November 4, 1989	4	
"Cha Cha Cha"	MC Lyte	December 2, 1989	2	
"New Jack Swing"	Wrecks-n-Effect	December 16, 1989	1	
"Somebody for Me"	Heavy D & the Boyz	December 23, 1989	2	
"The D.O.C. & The Doctor"	The D.O.C.	January 6, 1990	2	
"Expression" †	Salt-n-Pepa	January 20, 1990	8	
"The Humpty Dance"	Digital Underground	March 17, 1990	5	
"Murder Rap"	Above the Law	April 21, 1990	2	
"Funhouse"	Kid 'n Play	May 5, 1990	3	
"911 Is a Joke"	Public Enemy	May 26, 1990	2	
"AmeriKKKa's Most Wanted"	Ice Cube	June 9, 1990	3	
"The Power"	Snap!	June 30, 1990	3	
"We're All in the Same Gang"	The West Coast Rap All-Stars	July 21, 1990	4	
"Untouchable"	Above the Law	August 18, 1990	1	
"Banned in the U.S.A."	Luke featuring the 2 Live Crew	August 25, 1990	1	
"Call Me D-Nice"	D-Nice	September 1, 1990	4	
"Treat Them Like They Want to Be Treated"	Father MC	September 29, 1990	1	
"The Boomin' System"	LL Cool J	October 6, 1990	2	
"Ice Ice Baby"	Vanilla Ice	October 20, 1990	1	
"Knockin' Boots"	Candyman	October 27, 1990	6	
"Monie in the Middle"	Monie Love	December 8, 1990	2	
"I'll Do 4 U"	Father MC	December 22, 1990	3	
"Around the Way Girl"	LL Cool J	January 12, 1991	4	
"Gold Digger"	EPMD	February 9, 1991	3	
"Treat 'Em Right" †	Chubb Rock	March 2, 1991	3	
"Looking at the Front Door"	Main Source	March 23, 1991	3	
"It's a Shame (My Sister)"	Monie Love featuring True Image	April 13, 1991	2	
"Daddy's Little Girl"	Nikki D	April 27, 1991	2	
"I Got to Have It"	Ed O.G. and Da Bulldogs	May 11, 1991	1	
"Mama Said Knock You Out"	LL Cool J	May 18, 1991	1	
"You Can't Play with My Yo-Yo"	Yo-Yo featuring Ice Cube	May 25, 1991	4	
"Rise 'n' Shine"	Kool Moe Dee featuring KRS-One and Chuck D	June 22, 1991	2	
"Homey Don't Play Dat"	Terminator X	July 6, 1991	1	
"Pop Goes the Weasel"	3rd Bass	July 13, 1991	2	
"Summertime"	DJ Jazzy Jeff & The Fresh Prince	July 27, 1991	2	
"The Chubbster"	Chubb Rock	August 10, 1991	2	
"The House the Dog Built"	Jibri Wise One	August 24, 1991	2	
"Growin' Up in the Hood"	Compton's Most Wanted	September 7, 1991	1	
"O.P.P."	Naughty by Nature	September 14, 1991	4	
"Fuck Compton"	Tim Dog	October 12, 1991	1	
"Mind Playing Tricks on Me"	Geto Boys	October 19, 1991	3	
"Can't Truss It"	Public Enemy	November 9, 1991	3	
"Check the Rhime"	A Tribe Called Quest	November 30, 1991	1	
"Ain't Gonna Hurt Nobody"	Kid 'n Play	December 7, 1991	2	
"Blue Cheese"	The U.M.C.'s	December 21, 1991	2	
"Just the Two of Us"	Chubb Rock	January 4, 1992	2	
"The Phuncky Feel One" / "How I Could Just Kill a Man" †	Cypress Hill	January 18, 1992	5	
"The Choice Is Yours (Revisited)"	Black Sheep	February 22, 1992	2	
"Poor Georgie"	MC Lyte	March 7, 1992	1	
"Oochie Coochie"	MC Brains	March 14, 1992	2	
"Shut 'em Down"	Public Enemy	March 28, 1992	1	
"The Jam"	Shabba Ranks featuring KRS-One	April 4, 1992	1	
"The International Zone Coaster"	Leaders of the New School	April 11, 1992	1	
"Jump"	Kris Kross	April 18, 1992	5	
"Tennessee"	Arrested Development	May 23, 1992	1	
"They Want EFX"	Das EFX	May 30, 1992	3	
"Sometimes I Rhyme Slow"	Nice & Smooth	June 20, 1992	1	
"They Reminisce Over You (T.R.O.Y.)"	Pete Rock & CL Smooth	June 27, 1992	3	
"Take It Personal"	Gang Starr	July 18, 1992	1	
"Warm It Up"	Kris Kross	July 25, 1992	3	
"Don't Sweat the Technique"	Eric B. & Rakim	August 15, 1992	1	
"Fakin' the Funk"	Main Source	August 22, 1992	1	
"Crossover"	EPMD	August 29, 1992	3	
"People Everyday"	Arrested Development	September 19, 1992	3	
"Mic Checka"	Das EFX	October 10, 1992	1	
"360 Degrees (What Goes Around)"	Grand Puba	October 17, 1992	1	
"Here It Comes" / "Back to the Grill"	MC Serch	October 24, 1992	1	
"Ever So Clear"	Bushwick Bill	October 31, 1992	1	
"Blow Your Mind"	Redman	November 7, 1992	1	
"Lost in the Storm"	Chubb Rock	November 14, 1992	2	
"Rump Shaker"	Wreckx-n-Effect	November 28, 1992	3	
"Not Gonna Be Able to Do It"	Double XX Posse	December 19, 1992	1	
"Flex"	Mad Cobra	December 26, 1992	2	
"Wicked"	Ice Cube	January 9, 1993	2	
"I Got a Man"	Positive K	January 23, 1993	2	
"Rebirth of Slick (Cool Like Dat)"	Digable Planets	February 6, 1993	3	
"Informer"	Snow	February 27, 1993	2	
"Nuthin' but a 'G' Thang"	Dr. Dre featuring Snoop Doggy Dogg	March 12, 1993	3	
"Throw Ya Gunz"	Onyx	April 3, 1993	2	
"Time 4 Sum Aksion"	Redman	April 17, 1993	1	
"It Was a Good Day"	Ice Cube	April 24, 1993	1	
"Down with the King"	Run–D.M.C. featuring Pete Rock & CL Smooth	May 1, 1993	2	
"How I'm Comin'"	LL Cool J	May 15, 1993	1	
"Typical Reasons (Swing My Way)"	Prince Markie Dee and Soul Convention	May 22, 1993	1	
"Deeper"	Boss	May 29, 1993	3	
"Head or Gut" / "We Getz Busy" †	Illegal	June 19, 1993	2	
"Lots of Lovin'"	Pete Rock & CL Smooth	July 3, 1993	1	
"Passin' Me By"	The Pharcyde	July 10, 1993	1	
"Slam"	Onyx	July 17, 1993	2	
"Bonnie & Clyde" / "IBWin' wit My Crewin'"	Yo-Yo	July 31, 1993	1	
"Insane in the Brain"	Cypress Hill	August 7, 1993	3	
"Ruffneck"	MC Lyte	August 28, 1993	1	
"Check Yo Self"	Ice Cube featuring Das EFX	September 4, 1993	1	
"Alright"	Kris Kross featuring Super Cat	September 11, 1993	2	
"Grand Groove" / "At Large"	Intelligent Hoodlum	September 25, 1993	1	
"Chief Rocka"	Lords of the Underground	October 2, 1993	1	
"We Getz Busy" ↑ †	Illegal	October 9, 1993	1	
"Flow Joe"	Fat Joe	October 16, 1993	1	
"Recipe of a Hoe"	Boss	October 23, 1993	1	
"Valley of the Skinz"	Trends of Culture	October 30, 1993	1	
"What's Next"	Leaders of the New School	November 6, 1993	1	
"Stay Real"	Erick Sermon	November 13, 1993	1	
"Shoop"	Salt-n-Pepa	November 20, 1993	5	
"What's My Name?"	Snoop Doggy Dogg	December 25, 1993	3	
"Getto Jam"	Domino	January 15, 1994	6	
"Whatta Man"	Salt-n-Pepa featuring En Vogue	February 26, 1994	2	
"Gin and Juice"	Snoop Doggy Dogg	March 12, 1994	2	
"Player's Ball"	Outkast	March 26, 1994	6	
"Got Me Waiting"	Heavy D & the Boyz	May 7, 1994	3	
"Regulate"	Warren G and Nate Dogg	May 28, 1994	3	
"Funkdafied" †	Da Brat	June 18, 1994	11	
"Tootsee Roll"	69 Boyz	September 3, 1994	1	
"Flava in Ya Ear"	Craig Mack	September 10, 1994	4	
"Tootsee Roll" ↑	69 Boyz	October 8, 1994	1	
"Flava in Ya Ear" ↑	Craig Mack	October 15, 1994	10	
"Tootsee Roll" ↑	69 Boyz	December 24, 1994	5	
"Big Poppa" / "Warning"	The Notorious B.I.G.	January 28, 1995	6	
"Dear Mama" / "Old School"	2Pac	March 11, 1995	1	
"Big Poppa" / "Warning" ↑	The Notorious B.I.G.	March 18, 1995	1	
"Dear Mama" / "Old School" ↑	2Pac	March 25, 1995	1	
"Big Poppa" / "Warning" ↑	The Notorious B.I.G.	April 1, 1995	2	
"Dear Mama" / "Old School" ↑	2Pac	April 15, 1995	1	
"Keep Their Heads Ringin'"	Dr. Dre	April 22, 1995	1	
"Dear Mama" / "Old School" ↑	2Pac	April 29, 1995	2	
"I'll Be There for You/You're All I Need to Get By"	Method Man featuring Mary J. Blige	May 13, 1995	6	
"One More Chance/Stay with Me" †	The Notorious B.I.G.	June 24, 1995	9	
"Boombastic" / "In the Summertime"	Shaggy / Shaggy featuring Rayvon	August 26, 1995	1	
"Gangsta's Paradise"	Coolio featuring L.V.	September 2, 1995	11	
"Cell Therapy"	Goodie Mob	November 18, 1995	1	
"Hey Lover"	LL Cool J	November 25, 1995	8	
"Tonite's tha Night"	Kris Kross	January 20, 1996	5	
"Get Money"	Junior M.A.F.I.A. featuring The Notorious B.I.G.	February 24, 1996	3	
"Woo Hah!! Got You All in Check" / "Everything Remains Raw"	Busta Rhymes	March 16, 1996	7	
"5 O'Clock"	Nonchalant	May 4, 1996	1	
"Tha Crossroads"	Bone Thugs-n-Harmony	May 11, 1996	6	
"How Do U Want It" / "California Love" †	2Pac featuring K-Ci & JoJo / 2Pac featuring Dr. Dre and Roger Troutman	June 22, 1996	6	
"Elevators (Me & You)"	Outkast	August 3, 1996	4	
"Loungin"	LL Cool J	August 31, 1996	4	
"How Do U Want It" / "California Love" ↑ †	2Pac featuring K-Ci & JoJo / 2Pac featuring Dr. Dre and Roger Troutman	September 28, 1996	2	
"Bow Down"	Westside Connection	October 12, 1996	2	
"Po Pimp"	Do or Die featuring Twista	October 26, 1996	1	
"Bow Down" ↑	Westside Connection	November 2, 1996	1	
"Street Dreams"	Nas	November 9, 1996	1	
"No Time"	Lil' Kim featuring Puff Daddy	November 16, 1996	9	
"Cold Rock a Party"	MC Lyte	January 18, 1997	2	
"Can't Nobody Hold Me Down"	Puff Daddy featuring Mase	February 1, 1997	12	
"Hypnotize"	The Notorious B.I.G.	April 26, 1997	7	
"I'll Be Missing You" †	Puff Daddy and Faith Evans featuring 112	June 14, 1997	8	
"Mo Money Mo Problems"	The Notorious B.I.G. featuring Puff Daddy and Mase	August 9, 1997	4	
"Up Jumps da Boogie"	Timbaland & Magoo	September 6, 1997	8	
"Feel So Good"	Mase	November 1, 1997	6	
"Been Around the World"	Puff Daddy & the Family featuring The Notorious B.I.G. and Mase	December 13, 1997	6	
"Dangerous"	Busta Rhymes	January 24, 1998	1	
"Father"	LL Cool J	January 31, 1998	3	
"Deja Vu (Uptown Baby)" †	Lord Tariq and Peter Gunz	February 21, 1998	1	
"Gettin' Jiggy wit It"	Will Smith	February 28, 1998	2	
"Deja Vu (Uptown Baby)" ↑ †	Lord Tariq and Peter Gunz	March 14, 1998	4	
"Romeo and Juliet"	Sylk-E. Fyne featuring Chill	April 11, 1998	4	
"Turn It Up (Remix)/Fire It Up"	Busta Rhymes	May 9, 1998	4	
"Money, Power & Respect"	The LOX featuring DMX and Lil' Kim	June 6, 1998	1	
"Raise the Roof"	Luke featuring No Good but So Good	June 13, 1998	1	
"I Got the Hook Up"	Master P featuring Sons of Funk	June 20, 1998	1	
"Come with Me"	Puff Daddy featuring Jimmy Page	June 27, 1998	5	
"Lookin' at Me"	Mase featuring Puff Daddy	August 1, 1998	10	
"Just the Two of Us"	Will Smith	October 10, 1998	2	
"Superthug (What What)"	Noreaga	October 24, 1998	1	
"Pushin' Weight"	Ice Cube featuring Mr. Short Khop	October 31, 1998	2	
"Doo Wop (That Thing)"	Lauryn Hill	November 14, 1998	4	
"Pushin' Weight" ↑	Ice Cube featuring Mr. Short Khop	December 12, 1998	1	
"Ghetto Cowboy"	Mo Thugs Family featuring Bone Thugs-n-Harmony	December 19, 1998	8	
"Watch for the Hook"	Cool Breeze featuring Outkast, Goodie Mob and Witchdoctor	February 13, 1999	3	
"It Ain't My Fault" / "Somebody Like Me"	Silkk the Shocker featuring Mystikal / Silkk the Shocker featuring Mýa	March 6, 1999	3	
"What's It Gonna Be?!"	Busta Rhymes featuring Janet Jackson	March 27, 1999	5	
"Who Dat" †	JT Money featuring Solé	May 1, 1999	8	
"No Pigeons"	Sporty Thievz featuring Mr. Woods	June 26, 1999	4	
"Wild Wild West"	Will Smith featuring Dru Hill and Kool Moe Dee	July 24, 1999	3	
"Jamboree"	Naughty by Nature featuring Zhané	August 14, 1999	4	
"Jigga My Nigga"	Jay-Z	September 11, 1999	2	
"I Want It All"	Warren G featuring Mack 10	September 25, 1999	4	
"Satisfy You"	Puff Daddy featuring R. Kelly	October 23, 1999	4	
"4, 5, 6"	Solé featuring JT Money and Kandi	November 20, 1999	1	
"Hot Boyz"	Missy Elliott featuring Nas, Eve and Q-Tip	November 27, 1999	18	

== Bibliography ==
- Keyes, Cheryl Lynette (2004). Rap Music and Street Consciousness. University of Illinois Press. ISBN 978-0-252-07201-7.
- Hess, Mickey (2007). Icons of Hip Hop: An Encyclopedia of the Movement, Music, and Culture. ABC-CLIO. ISBN 978-0-313-33902-8.
- Whitburn, Joel (1990). Billboard's 1989 Music and Video Yearbook. Record Research. ISBN 978-0-898-20075-1.
