= List of Billboard Hot 100 top-ten singles in 1999 =

This is a list of singles that charted in the top ten of the Billboard Hot 100 during 1999.

Whitney Houston and Faith Evans each had three top-ten hits in 1999, tying them for the most top-ten hits during the year.

== Top-ten singles ==
Key

- ↑ – indicates single's top 10 entry was also its Hot 100 debut
- † – indicates Best performing song of the year

List of Billboard Hot 100 top ten singles which peaked in 1999
Top ten entry date	Single	Artist(s)	Peak	Peak date	Weeks in top ten
Singles from 1998
December 12	"Have You Ever?"	Brandy	1	January 16	13
December 12	"...Baby One More Time" (#5)	Britney Spears	1	January 30	14
December 12	"Lullaby"	Shawn Mullins	7	January 16	6
Singles from 1999
January 2	"Trippin'"	Total featuring Missy Elliott	7	January 9	3
January 16	"Save Tonight"	Eagle-Eye Cherry	5	January 23	4
January 23	"Hands"	Jewel	6	January 23	3
January 23	"Slide"	Goo Goo Dolls	8	February 13	8
January 30	"Jumper"	Third Eye Blind	5	January 30	3
January 30	"Angel of Mine" (#3)	Monica	1	February 13	15
February 6	"All I Have to Give"	Backstreet Boys	5	February 6	9
February 6	"Angel"	Sarah McLachlan	4	March 6	8
February 13	"Believe" † (#1)	Cher	1	March 13	16
February 13	"Heartbreak Hotel" (#4)	Whitney Houston featuring Faith Evans and Kelly Price	2	March 20	15
February 20	"Faded Pictures"	Case featuring Joe	10	February 20	1
February 27	"(God Must Have Spent) A Little More Time on You"	'N Sync	8	February 27	2
March 6	"You"	Jesse Powell	10	March 6	1
March 13	"I Still Believe"	Mariah Carey	4	March 20	7
March 13	"Every Morning" (#8)	Sugar Ray	3	April 3	13
March 13	"No Scrubs" (#2)	TLC	1	April 10	17
March 20	"Kiss Me" (#6)	Sixpence None the Richer	2	May 1	16
March 27	"What's It Gonna Be?!"	Busta Rhymes featuring Janet Jackson	3	April 17	9
April 3	"All Night Long"	Faith Evans featuring Puff Daddy	9	April 3	2
April 10	"Stay the Same"	Joey McIntyre	10	April 10	2
April 17	"C'est la Vie"	B*Witched	9	April 17	2
May 1	"Livin' la Vida Loca" (#10)	Ricky Martin	1	May 8	14
May 1	"Please Remember Me"	Tim McGraw	10	May 1	1
May 8	"Who Dat"	JT Money featuring Solé	5	May 22	6
May 15	"Fortunate"	Maxwell	4	May 29	9
May 15	"Give It to You"	Jordan Knight	10	May 15	1
May 22	"Where My Girls At?"	702	4	June 19	19
May 29	"If You Had My Love"	Jennifer Lopez	1	June 12	15
May 29	"808"	Blaque	8	June 12	4
June 5	"That Don't Impress Me Much"	Shania Twain	7	June 12	4
June 12	"Chanté's Got a Man"	Chanté Moore	10	June 12	2
June 19	"I Want It That Way"	Backstreet Boys	6	June 26	11
June 26	"Last Kiss"	Pearl Jam	2	June 26	10
June 26	"The Hardest Thing"	98 Degrees	5	July 3	3
July 3	"It's Not Right but It's Okay"	Whitney Houston	4	July 3	5
July 10	"Bills, Bills, Bills"	Destiny's Child	1	July 17	10
July 10	"Wild Wild West"	Will Smith featuring Dru Hill and Kool Moe Dee	1	July 24	6
July 17	"Genie in a Bottle" (#7)	Christina Aguilera	1	July 31	14
July 17	"All Star"	Smash Mouth	4	August 14	12
August 7	"Tell Me It's Real"	K-Ci & JoJo	2	August 14	4
August 7	"Summer Girls"	LFO	3	August 28	8
August 21	"Jamboree"	Naughty by Nature featuring Zhané	10	August 21	1
August 28	"Bailamos"	Enrique Iglesias	1	September 4	6
September 4	"Unpretty"	TLC	1	September 18	14
September 4	"Smooth"	Santana featuring Rob Thomas	1	October 23	30
September 4	"Someday"	Sugar Ray	7	October 2	7
September 11	"Lost in You" ↑	Chris Gaines	5	September 11	2
September 18	"She's All I Ever Had"	Ricky Martin	2	September 25	5
September 25	"Mambo No. 5"	Lou Bega	3	November 13	12
October 2	"Scar Tissue"	Red Hot Chili Peppers	9	October 2	4
October 2	"I Need to Know"	Marc Anthony	3	November 27	19
October 9	"Heartbreaker"	Mariah Carey featuring Jay-Z	1	October 9	8
October 16	"Music of My Heart"	Gloria Estefan and 'N Sync	2	October 16	3
October 23	"Satisfy You"	Puff Daddy featuring R. Kelly	2	October 30	6
October 23	"We Can't Be Friends"	Deborah Cox featuring R.L.	8	October 23	3
November 6	"Back at One"	Brian McKnight	2	November 20	15
November 6	"Steal My Sunshine"	Len	9	November 13	3
November 13	"(You Drive Me) Crazy"	Britney Spears	10	November 13	1
November 20	"I Wanna Love You Forever"	Jessica Simpson	3	December 11	10
November 27	"Waiting for Tonight"	Jennifer Lopez	8	December 4	4
December 4	"U Know What's Up"	Donell Jones featuring Lisa Lopes	7	December 11	6
December 11	"Girl on TV"	LFO	10	December 11	2
December 18	"24/7"	Kevon Edmonds	10	December 18	2

=== 1998 peaks ===
List of Billboard Hot 100 top ten singles in 1999 which peaked in 1998
Top ten entry date	Single	Artist(s)	Peak	Peak date	Weeks in top ten
October 17	"Because of You"	98 Degrees	3	November 21	14
October 24	"Lately"	Divine	1	November 28	14
November 7	"Nobody's Supposed to Be Here" (#9)	Deborah Cox	2	December 5	20
November 14	"Doo Wop (That Thing)" ↑	Lauryn Hill	1	November 14	11
December 5	"From This Moment On"	Shania Twain	4	December 19	6
December 5	"I'm Your Angel"	Céline Dion and R. Kelly	1	December 5	10
December 5	"Love Like This"	Faith Evans	7	December 12	6

=== 2000 peaks ===
List of Billboard Hot 100 top ten singles in 1999 which peaked in 2000
Top ten entry date	Single	Artist(s)	Peak	Peak date	Weeks in top ten
October 9	"My Love Is Your Love"	Whitney Houston	4	January 1	17
December 4	"I Knew I Loved You"	Savage Garden	1	January 29	17
December 18	"Hot Boyz"	Missy Elliott featuring Lil' Mo, Nas, Eve and Q-Tip	5	January 8	10
December 25	"Bring It All to Me"	Blaque	5	January 22	9

== Artists with most top-ten songs ==
List of artists by total songs peaking in the top-ten
Artist	Numbers of songs
Whitney Houston	3
Faith Hill	3
Britney Spears	2
Missy Elliott	2
Backstreet Boys	2
'N Sync	2
Mariah Carey	2
Sugar Ray	2
TLC	2
Ricky Martin	2
Jennifer Lopez	2
Blaque	2
98 Degrees	2
LFO	2
R. Kelly	2
Deborah Cox	2
Shania Twain	2

== See also ==
- 1999 in music
- List of Billboard Hot 100 number ones of 1999
- Billboard Year-End Hot 100 singles of 1999
