= Billboard Year-End Hot 100 singles of 1999 =

Ranking of recorded music

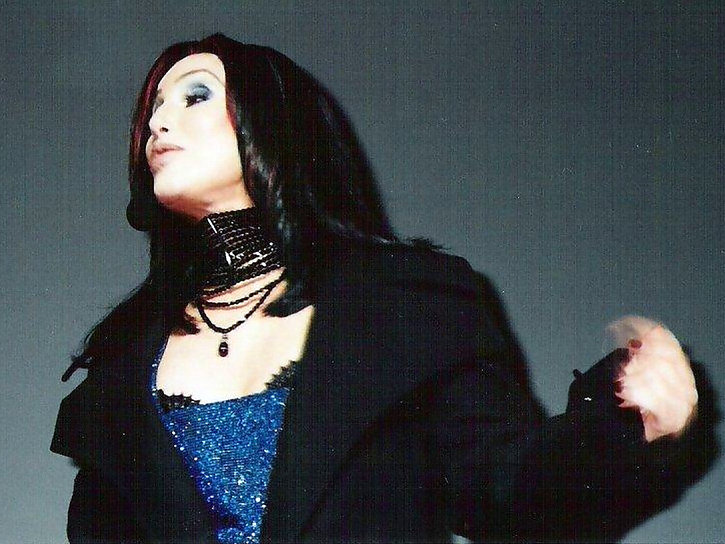
Cher (pictured) topped the list with "Believe" after the song was number one on the Hot 100 chart for four weeks, making her the oldest female artist to top the chart. It also gave her her first number one on the Hot 100 since "Dark Lady" in 1974, giving her the longest gap between number ones at nearly 25 years.

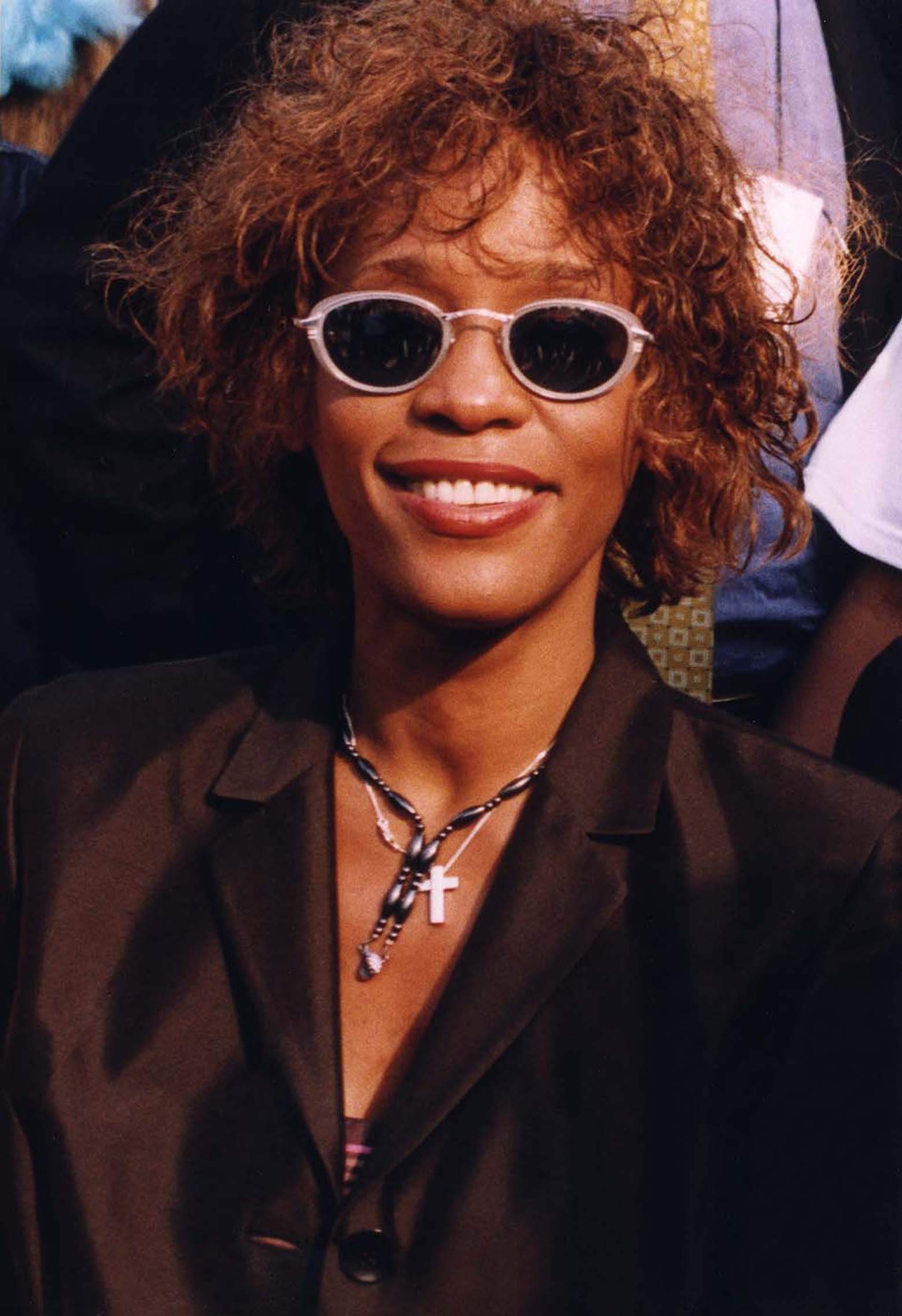
Whitney Houston (pictured) had four songs, all of which came from her 1998 album My Love Is Your Love, on the Year-End chart, the most of any artist that year. These included "Heartbreak Hotel" at number four, "It's Not Right but It's Okay" at number 44, "My Love Is Your Love" at number 73, and "When You Believe" with Mariah Carey at number 99.

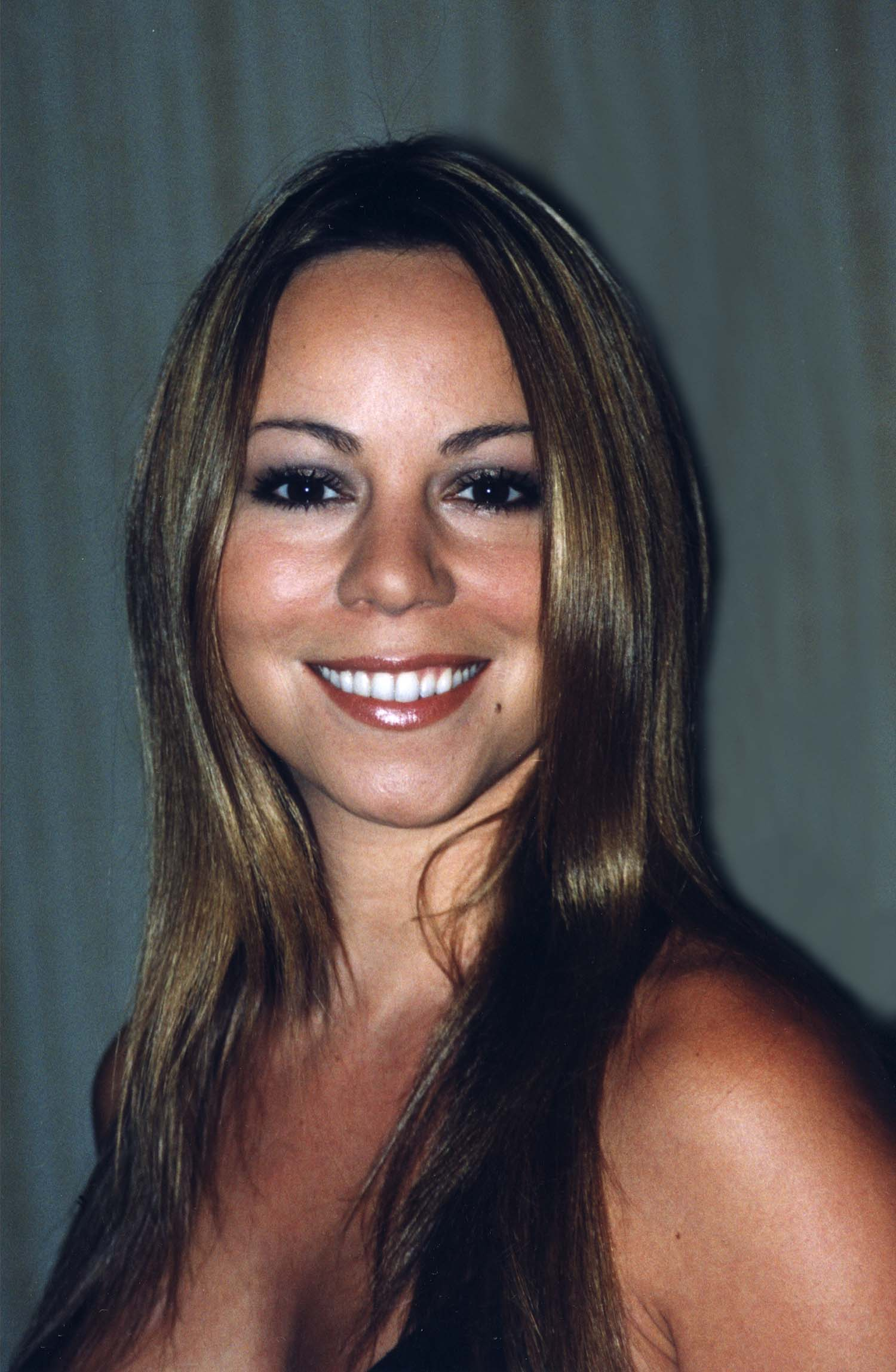
"I Still Believe" and "When You Believe", two singles by Mariah Carey (pictured) from her 1998 compilation album #1's, made it onto the Year-End list at numbers 36 and 99, respectively, while her song "Heartbreaker" placed at number 35.

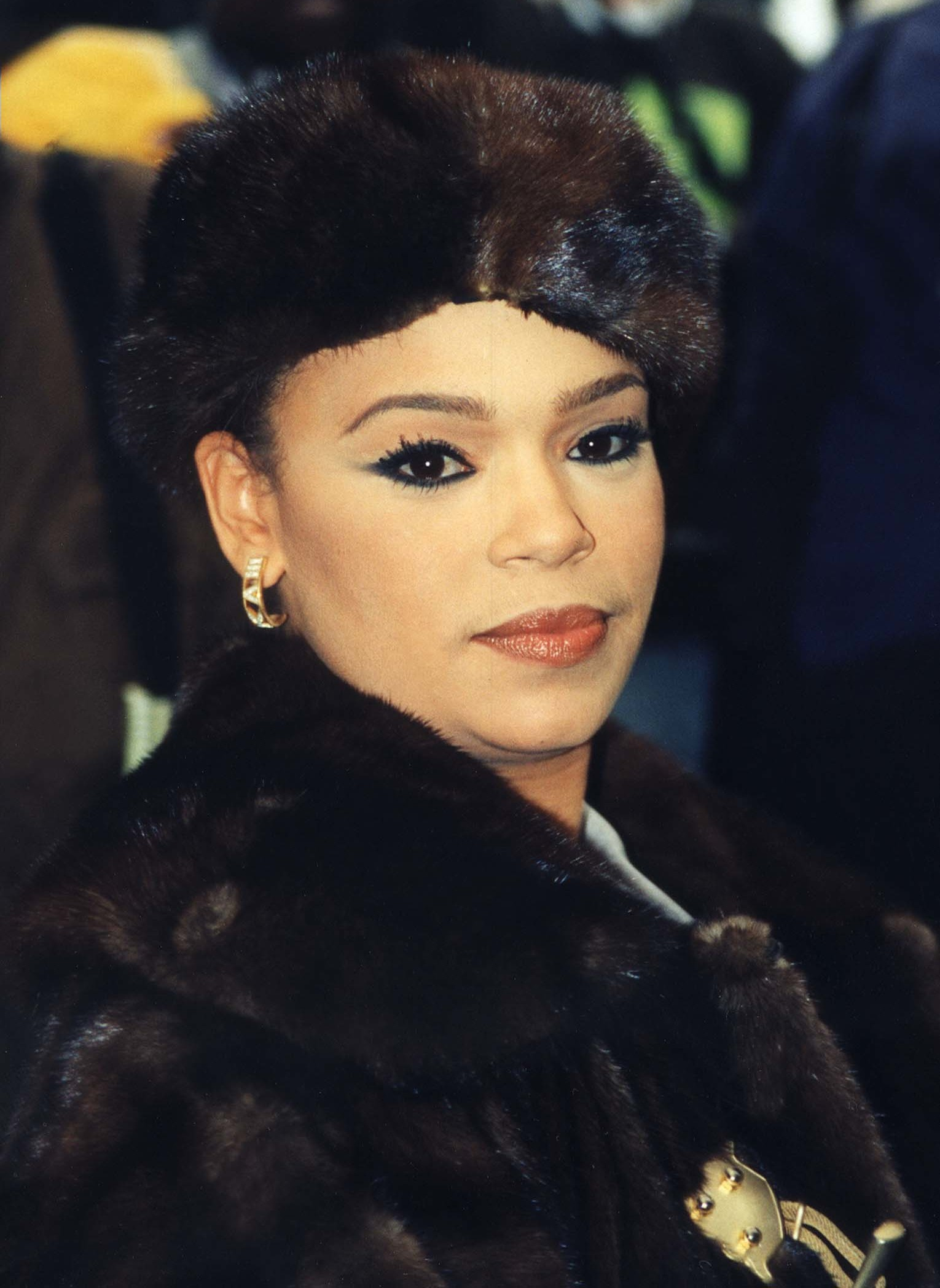
Two singles by Faith Evans (pictured) from her 1998 album Keep the Faith—"Love Like This" and "All Night Long"—appeared on the Year-End list at numbers 58 and 74, respectively. Evans was also featured on Houston's "Heartbreak Hotel" alongside Kelly Price.

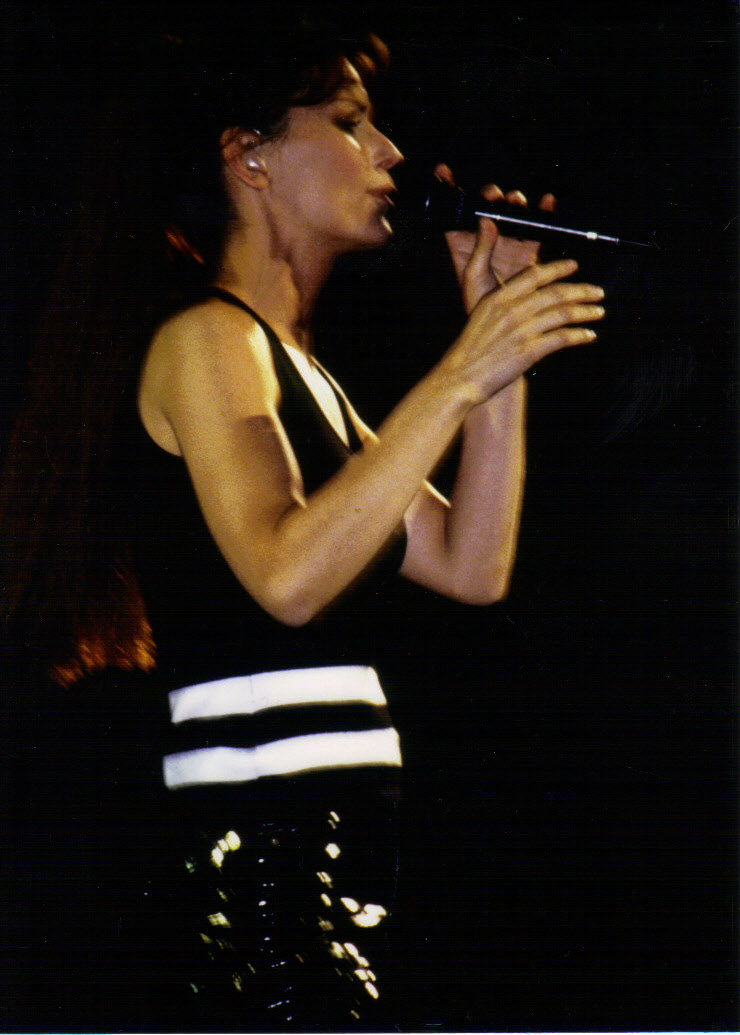
Shania Twain had three songs on 1999's year-end chart: "That Don't Impress Me Much" at number 32, "From This Moment On" at number 57, and "Man! I Feel Like a Woman!" at number 77. All of them appeared on her 1997 studio album Come On Over.

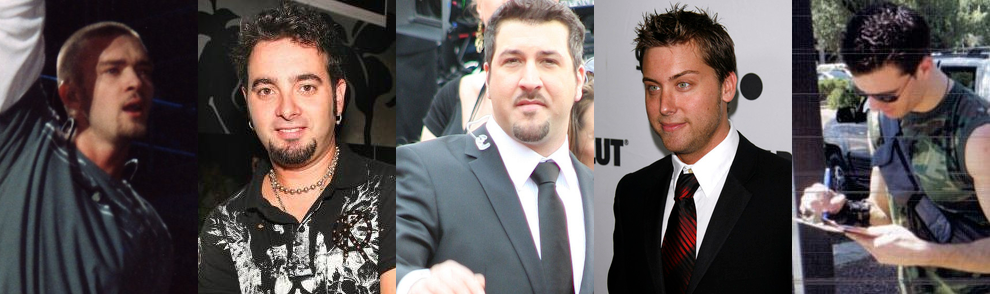
NSYNC appeared thrice on the 1999 year-end chart. Their song "(God Must Have Spent) A Little More Time on You" charted at both number 45 and at number 100, the latter being a collaboration with Alabama, and their song "Music of My Heart" with Gloria Estefan charted at number 97.

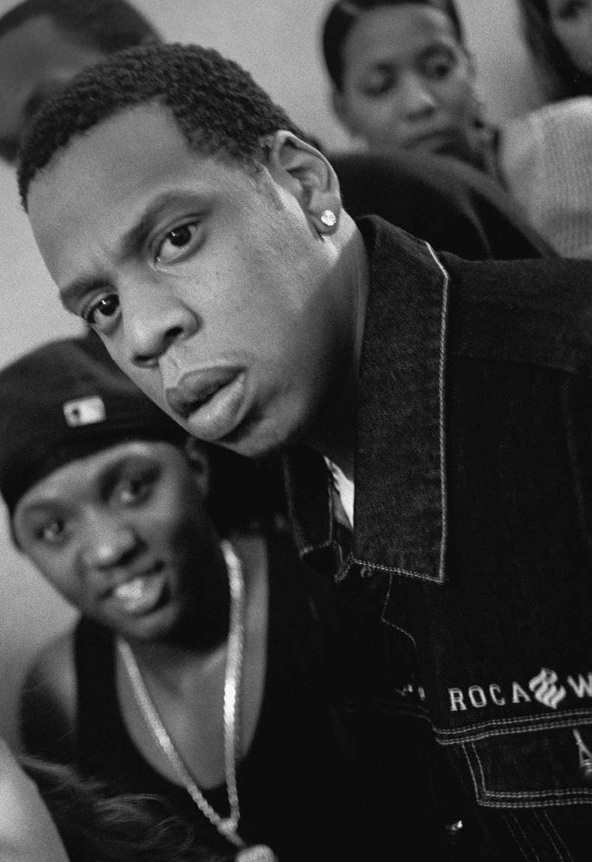
Jay-Z's three appearances on the year-end list include his feature on Carey's song "Heartbreaker", his highest entry at number 35, as well as his songs "Can I Get A..." (number 39) and "Hard Knock Life (Ghetto Anthem)" (number 89).

This is a list of Billboard magazine's Top Hot 100 songs of 1999.

No.	Title	Artist(s)
1	"Believe"	Cher
2	"No Scrubs"	TLC
3	"Angel of Mine"	Monica
4	"Heartbreak Hotel"	Whitney Houston featuring Faith Evans and Kelly Price
5	"...Baby One More Time"	Britney Spears
6	"Kiss Me"	Sixpence None the Richer
7	"Genie in a Bottle"	Christina Aguilera
8	"Every Morning"	Sugar Ray
9	"Nobody's Supposed to Be Here"	Deborah Cox
10	"Livin' la Vida Loca"	Ricky Martin
11	"Where My Girls At?"	702
12	"If You Had My Love"	Jennifer Lopez
13	"Slide"	Goo Goo Dolls
14	"Have You Ever?"	Brandy
15	"I Want It That Way"	Backstreet Boys
16	"I'm Your Angel"	R. Kelly and Celine Dion
17	"All Star"	Smash Mouth
18	"Angel"	Sarah McLachlan
19	"Smooth"	Santana featuring Rob Thomas
20	"Unpretty"	TLC
21	"Bills, Bills, Bills"	Destiny's Child
22	"Save Tonight"	Eagle-Eye Cherry
23	"Last Kiss"	Pearl Jam
24	"Fortunate"	Maxwell
25	"All I Have to Give"	Backstreet Boys
26	"Bailamos"	Enrique Iglesias
27	"What's It Gonna Be?!"	Busta Rhymes featuring Janet
28	"What It's Like"	Everlast
29	"Fly Away"	Lenny Kravitz
30	"Someday"	Sugar Ray
31	"Lately"	Divine
32	"That Don't Impress Me Much"	Shania Twain
33	"Wild Wild West"	Will Smith featuring Dru Hill and Kool Moe Dee
34	"Scar Tissue"	Red Hot Chili Peppers
35	"Heartbreaker"	Mariah Carey featuring Jay-Z
36	"I Still Believe"	Mariah Carey
37	"The Hardest Thing"	98 Degrees
38	"Summer Girls"	LFO
39	"Can I Get A..."	Jay-Z featuring Amil and Ja Rule
40	"Jumper"	Third Eye Blind
41	"Doo Wop (That Thing)"	Lauryn Hill
42	"Mambo No. 5"	Lou Bega
43	"Sweet Lady"	Tyrese
44	"It's Not Right but It's Okay"	Whitney Houston
45	"(God Must Have Spent) A Little More Time on You"	NSYNC
46	"Lullaby"	Shawn Mullins
47	"Anywhere"	112 featuring Lil Zane
48	"Tell Me It's Real"	K-Ci & JoJo
49	"Back 2 Good"	Matchbox 20
50	"808"	Blaque
51	"She's So High"	Tal Bachman
52	"She's All I Ever Had"	Ricky Martin
53	"Miami"	Will Smith
54	"Hands"	Jewel
55	"Who Dat"	JT Money featuring Solé
56	"Please Remember Me"	Tim McGraw
57	"From This Moment On"	Shania Twain
58	"Love Like This"	Faith Evans
59	"You"	Jesse Powell
60	"Trippin'"	Total featuring Missy Elliott
61	"If You"	Silk
62	"Ex-Factor"	Lauryn Hill
63	"Give It to You"	Jordan Knight
64	"Black Balloon"	Goo Goo Dolls
65	"Spend My Life with You"	Eric Benét featuring Tamia
66	"These Are the Times"	Dru Hill
67	"I Don't Want to Miss a Thing"	Mark Chesnutt
68	"I Do (Cherish You)"	98 Degrees
69	"Because of You"	98 Degrees
70	"I Will Remember You"	Sarah McLachlan
71	"Chanté's Got a Man"	Chanté Moore
72	"Happily Ever After"	Case
73	"My Love Is Your Love"	Whitney Houston
74	"All Night Long"	Faith Evans featuring Puff Daddy
75	"Back That Thang Up"	Juvenile featuring Mannie Fresh and Lil Wayne
76	"Almost Doesn't Count"	Brandy
77	"Man! I Feel Like a Woman!"	Shania Twain
78	"Steal My Sunshine"	Len
79	"I Need to Know"	Marc Anthony
80	"So Anxious"	Ginuwine
81	"Faded Pictures"	Case featuring Joe
82	"Back at One"	Brian McKnight
83	"When a Woman's Fed Up"	R. Kelly
84	"How Forever Feels"	Kenny Chesney
85	"Amazed"	Lonestar
86	"Sometimes"	Britney Spears
87	"Ghetto Cowboy"	Mo Thugs
88	"Out of My Head"	Fastball
89	"Hard Knock Life (Ghetto Anthem)"	Jay-Z
90	"Jamboree"	Naughty by Nature featuring Zhané
91	"Take Me There"	Blackstreet featuring Mýa, Mase and Blinky Blink
92	"Stay the Same"	Joey McIntyre
93	"A Lesson in Leavin'"	Jo Dee Messina
94	"Iris"	Goo Goo Dolls
95	"Satisfy You"	Puff Daddy featuring R. Kelly
96	"Better Days (And the Bottom Drops Out)"	Citizen King
97	"Music of My Heart"	NSYNC and Gloria Estefan
98	"Write This Down"	George Strait
99	"When You Believe"	Whitney Houston and Mariah Carey
100	"(God Must Have Spent) A Little More Time on You"	Alabama and NSYNC

== See also ==
- 1999 in music
- Billboard Year-End Hot R&B/Hip-Hop Singles & Tracks of 1999
- Billboard Year-End Hot Rap Singles of 1999
- List of Billboard Hot 100 number-one singles of 1999
- List of Billboard Hot 100 top-ten singles in 1999
