= Sporty =

Sporty may refer to:

- Sportsmanship
- Sporty, Australian radio program
- Sporty, stage name of Øystein Andersen, drummer in the Norwegian rock band Wig Wam
- "Sporty Spice", stage name of Melanie C, of the Spice Girls music group
- Sporty Thievz, an American hip-hop group
