= List of Hot R&B Singles & Tracks number ones of 1999 =

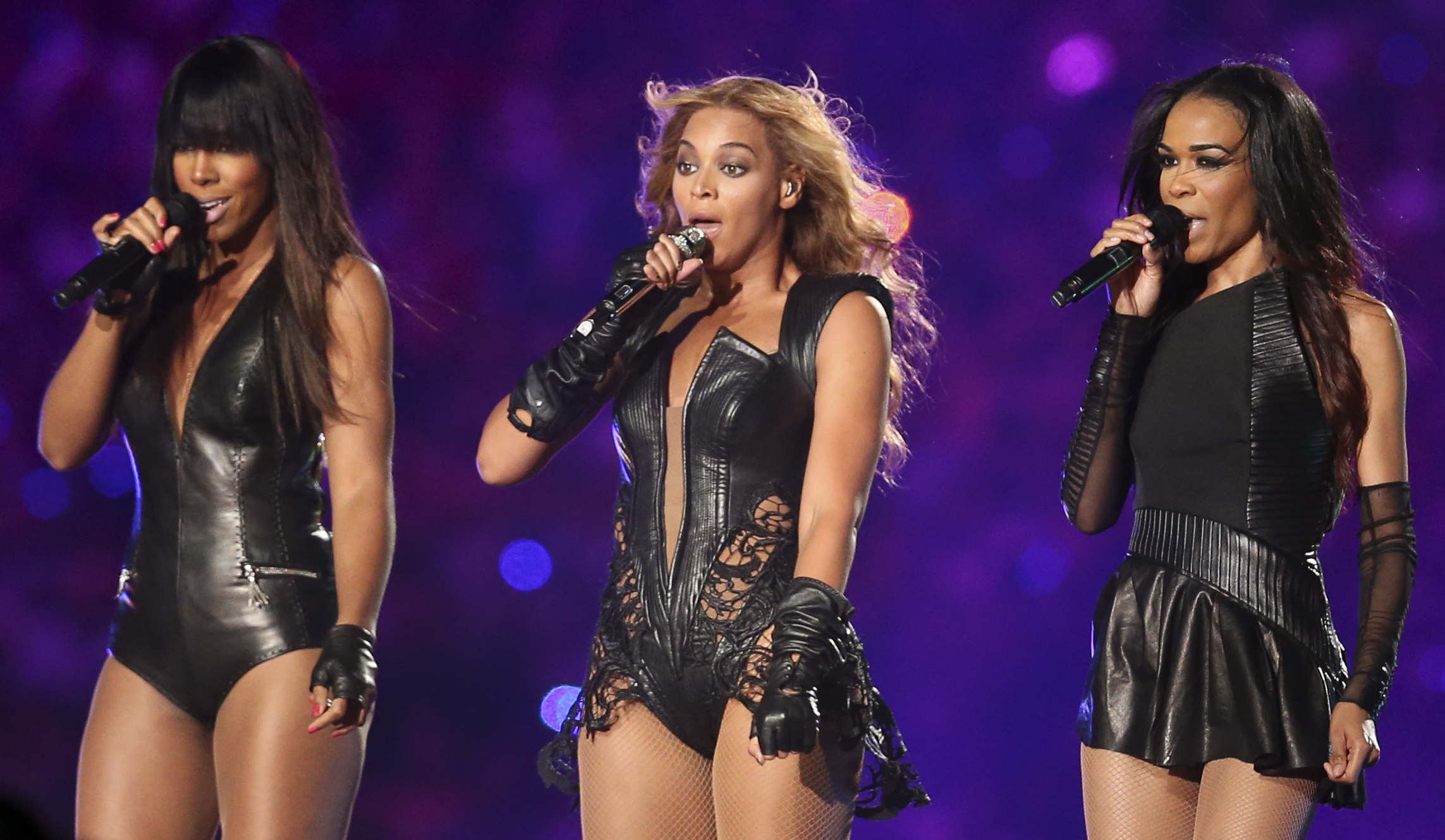
"Bills, Bills, Bills" was a long-running number one for Destiny's Child.

These are the Billboard magazine R&B singles chart number one hits of 1999:

== Chart history ==
Key
†	Indicates best-charting R&B single of 1999

Issue date	Song	Artist(s)
January 2	"Nobody's Supposed to Be Here"	Deborah Cox
January 9	"Nobody's Supposed to Be Here"	Deborah Cox
January 16	"Nobody's Supposed to Be Here"	Deborah Cox
January 23	"Nobody's Supposed to Be Here"	Deborah Cox
January 30	"Nobody's Supposed to Be Here"	Deborah Cox
February 6	"Nobody's Supposed to Be Here"	Deborah Cox
February 13	"Heartbreak Hotel"	Whitney Houston featuring Faith Evans and Kelly Price
February 20	"Heartbreak Hotel"	Whitney Houston featuring Faith Evans and Kelly Price
February 27	"Heartbreak Hotel"	Whitney Houston featuring Faith Evans and Kelly Price
March 6	"Heartbreak Hotel"	Whitney Houston featuring Faith Evans and Kelly Price
March 13	"Heartbreak Hotel"	Whitney Houston featuring Faith Evans and Kelly Price
March 20	"Heartbreak Hotel"	Whitney Houston featuring Faith Evans and Kelly Price
March 27	"Heartbreak Hotel"	Whitney Houston featuring Faith Evans and Kelly Price
April 3	"What's It Gonna Be?!"	Busta Rhymes featuring Janet Jackson
April 10	"No Scrubs"	TLC
April 17	"No Scrubs"	TLC
April 24	"No Scrubs"	TLC
May 1	"No Scrubs"	TLC
May 8	"No Scrubs"	TLC
May 15	"Fortunate" †	Maxwell
May 22	"Fortunate" †	Maxwell
May 29	"Fortunate" †	Maxwell
June 5	"Fortunate" †	Maxwell
June 12	"Fortunate" †	Maxwell
June 19	"Fortunate" †	Maxwell
June 26	"Fortunate" †	Maxwell
July 3	"Fortunate" †	Maxwell
July 10	"Bills, Bills, Bills"	Destiny's Child
July 17	"Bills, Bills, Bills"	Destiny's Child
July 24	"Bills, Bills, Bills"	Destiny's Child
July 31	"Bills, Bills, Bills"	Destiny's Child
August 7	"Bills, Bills, Bills"	Destiny's Child
August 14	"Bills, Bills, Bills"	Destiny's Child
August 21	"Bills, Bills, Bills"	Destiny's Child
August 28	"Bills, Bills, Bills"	Destiny's Child
September 4	"Bills, Bills, Bills"	Destiny's Child
September 11	"Never Gonna Let You Go"	Faith Evans
September 18	"Spend My Life with You"	Eric Benet featuring Tamia
September 25	"Spend My Life with You"	Eric Benet featuring Tamia
October 2	"We Can't Be Friends"	Deborah Cox featuring R.L.
October 9	"Heartbreaker"	Mariah Carey featuring Jay-Z
October 16	"Heartbreaker"	Mariah Carey featuring Jay-Z
October 23	"We Can't Be Friends"	Deborah Cox featuring R.L.
October 30	"Satisfy You"	Puff Daddy featuring R. Kelly
November 6	"Satisfy You"	Puff Daddy featuring R. Kelly
November 13	"U Know What's Up"	Donell Jones featuring Lisa "Left Eye" Lopes
November 20	"U Know What's Up"	Donell Jones featuring Lisa "Left Eye" Lopes
November 27	"U Know What's Up"	Donell Jones featuring Lisa "Left Eye" Lopes
December 4	"U Know What's Up"	Donell Jones featuring Lisa "Left Eye" Lopes
December 11	"U Know What's Up"	Donell Jones featuring Lisa "Left Eye" Lopes
December 18	"U Know What's Up"	Donell Jones featuring Lisa "Left Eye" Lopes
December 25	"U Know What's Up"	Donell Jones featuring Lisa "Left Eye" Lopes

== See also ==
- 1999 in music
- Billboard Year-End Hot R&B/Hip-Hop Singles & Tracks of 1999
- List of number-one R&B albums of 1999 (U.S.)
- List of Billboard Hot 100 number-one singles of 1999
