= Skin Deep (Solé album) =

Studio album by Solé
- Released: September 28, 1999
- Recorded: 1999
- Studio: Triangle Sound Studios (Atlanta, GA)
- Genre: Hip hop
- Length: 62:12
- Label: DreamWorks
- Producer: Big Trev; Chuckey Charles; Colin Wolfe; Focus...; Kevin Davis; Rashad Smith; Tricky Stewart

Solé chronology
Skin Deep (1999)	Encoded (2019)

Singles from Skin Deep
- 1. "Who Dat" Released: February 9, 1999; 2. "4, 5, 6" Released: October 12, 1999; 3. "It Wasn't Me" Released: March 14, 2000

Professional ratings
Review scores
Source	Rating
AllMusic	3/5 stars
The Source	3/5 stars

Skin Deep is the debut studio album by American rapper Solé. It was released on September 28, 1999, through DreamWorks Records. Production was handled by Focus..., Big Trev, Chuckey Charles, Colin Wolfe, Kevin Davis, Rashad Smith, and Christopher "Tricky" Stewart, who also served as executive producer together with Timmy Regisford. It features guest appearances from JT Money, Big Gipp, Bobbi Bosselina, J-Weav, Kandi Burruss, L.O., Ms. Toi, Mr. Raja, Tamar Braxton and Tech N9NE.

The album debuted at No. 127 on the Billboard 200, peaked at No. 27 on the Top R&B/Hip-Hop Albums and No. 1 on the Heatseekers Albums in the United States.

The album was supported with three singles: "Who Dat", "4, 5, 6" and "It Wasn't Me". "Who Dat", which peaked at No. 5 on the Billboard Hot 100 and number 2 on the Hot R&B/Hip-Hop Songs, previously appeared on JT Money's album Pimpin' on Wax. "4, 5, 6" made it to number 21 on the Billboard Hot 100 and number 9 on the Hot R&B/Hip-Hop Songs, while "It Wasn't Me" reached only 44th spot on the Hot R&B/Hip-Hop Songs. As of 2011, the album has sold over 479,000 copies according to Billboard.biz and is currently no longer in print.

== Track listing ==
No.	Title	Writer(s)	Producer(s)	Length
1.	"I'm Coming" (Interlude)		Focus...	0:52
2.	"Spell My Name Right" (featuring Mr. Raja)	Tonya Johnston; Bernard Edwards Jr.; Roger Green Jr.	Focus...; Tricky Stewart	4:09
3.	"Da Story"	Johnston; Trevin Clark; Green Jr.	Big Trev	3:31
4.	"Iy Yi Yi" (featuring Bobbi Bosselina and Ms. Toi)	Johnston; Jennifer Melchor; Toikeon Parham; Christopher Stewart; Green Jr.	Tricky Stewart	4:16
5.	"4, 5, 6" (featuring JT Money and Kandi)	Johnston; Jeffrey Thompkins; Kandi Burruss; Stewart	Tricky Stewart	4:15
6.	"Ain't Nobody Fuckin' wit It" (featuring Tech N9NE)	Johnston; Aaron Yates; Stewart	Tricky Stewart	4:26
7.	"We've Been Trying Too Long" (featuring Big Gipp)	Johnston; Cameron Gipp; Stewart; Orenthal Harper	Tricky Stewart	4:05
8.	"Antoine's Interlude"		Tricky Stewart; Focus...	1:41
9.	"Young Niggas"	Johnston; Stewart; Edwards Jr.	Tricky Stewart; Focus...	3:57
10.	"It Wasn't Me" (featuring J-Weav)	Johnston; Stewart; Burruss; Harper	Tricky Stewart	3:29
11.	"Pain"	Johnston; Stewart; Edwards Jr.; Green Jr.	Tricky Stewart; Focus...	4:17
12.	"4 the Love of You" (featuring Tamar)	Johnston; Chuckey Charles	Chuckey Charles	4:19
13.	"Our World" (featuring Lo...)	Johnston; Stewart; Omar Womack; R. Freeman	Tricky Stewart	3:47
14.	"Accurate Math"	Colin Wolfe; Rashad Smith; Green Jr.; Womack	Colin Wolfe; Rashad Smith	3:31
15.	"Get Up in It"	Johnston; Kevin Davis	K.D.; Tricky Stewart	3:27
16.	"Who Dat" (featuring JT Money)	Johnston; Thompkins; Di'Andre Davis; Thabiso Nkhereanye; Stewart	Tricky Stewart	3:55
17.	"Never Thought I"	Johnston; Stewart; D. Sochacki	Tricky Stewart	4:15
Total length:				62:12

== Charts ==
Chart (1999)	Peak position
US Billboard 200	127
US Top R&B/Hip-Hop Albums (Billboard)	27
US Heatseekers Albums (Billboard)	1
