= Cheapskate (disambiguation) =

Cheapskate can refer to a miser, or perhaps a behaviour associated with frugality.

Cheapskate may also refer to:

- Cheapskate Records (1979–1982; 1987–88), a record label
- "Cheapskate" (song) a 1997 song by Supergrass
- "Cheapskate" (You Ain't Gettin' Nada), a 1998 song by Sporty Thievz
- "Cheapskate" (Oliver Tree song), 2017
