= Street Cinema =

Studio album by Sporty Thievz
- Released: June 15, 1999
- Recorded: 1998–1999
- Genre: Hip hop
- Length: 67:57
- Labels: Ruffhouse; Columbia
- Producers: Ski (also exec.); Stephen Anderson (exec.); Darien Dash (exec.); King Kirk

Singles from Street Cinema
- 1. "Cheapskate (You Ain't Gettin' Nada)" Released: July 30, 1998; 2. "No Pigeons" Released: May 1999

Street Cinema is the only album by the American hip hop group Sporty Thievz.

== Background ==
Street Cinema was released on August 18, 1998, through Ruffhouse Records and was co-produced by Ski and Sporty Thievz member King Kirk. The album was one of the final to be released through Ruffhouse, as the label was shut down less than a year later.

Chart-wise, the album did not make much of an impact, only making it to 66 on the Top R&B/Hip-Hop Albums and 16 on the Top Heatseekers. The album's lead single, however, did. "No Pigeons" peaked at #12 on the Billboard Hot 100, giving the group their only top 40 hit during their brief existence, as well as #1 on the Hot Rap Singles. In addition to "No Pigeons", "Cheapskate" and its remix also became minor hits on the Billboard charts.

"No Pigeons" was certified gold by the RIAA on July 9, 1999, for sales of over 500,000 copies.

== Reception ==
Professional ratings
Review scores
Source	Rating
AllMusic	3/5 stars
The Source	3.5/5 stars

AllMusic gave the album three out of a possible five stars, writing that "there's too much junk floating around the album to make the good stuff instantly recognizable... Still, that handful of good cuts makes the entire enterprise worth investigating once, even if you find that you won't return to this Street Cinema that often."

== Track listing ==
No.	Title	Producer(s)	Length
1.	"Intro"		2:10
2.	"The Spot"	Ski	3:55
3.	"Fedz"	Ski	4:12
4.	"Freeks"	King Kirk	4:26
5.	"Spy Hunter"	Ski; King Kirk (co.)	3:46
6.	"Like Father, Like Son"	Ski	4:13
7.	"Raw Footage" (featuring Tragedy Khadafi)	Ski	4:47
8.	"Hitmen"	King Kirk	5:12
9.	"Cheapskate (You Ain't Gettin' Nada)"	Ski	3:36
10.	"Angel"	King Kirk; Ski	4:10
11.	"Mac Daddy"	King Kirk	6:19
12.	"Aquamen"	King Kirk	4:23
13.	"Ready" (featuring Peter Gunz)	Ski	4:14
14.	"Propose a Toast"	King Kirk	4:41
15.	"Street Cinema"	Ski	4:00
16.	"No Pigeons"	She'kspere; DJ Rhude (add.); Sporty Thievz (add.)	3:28
Total length:			67:57

== Personnel ==
- Darien Dash - executive producer
- David Anthony Willis - producer (tracks 2–3, 5–7, 9–10, 13, 15), executive producer
- Jane Blaze - vocals (track 8)
- Joe Quinde - mixing, recording
- Kevin Jerome Briggs - producer (track 16)
- Kirk Howell - main artist, producer (tracks 4, 8, 10–12, 14)
- Kibwe Dorsey - additional vocals (tracks 10, 14, 16)
- Lynn Simon - additional vocals (track 3)
- Manny Lecuona - mastering
- Marlon Bryan - main artist
- Mochell - additional vocals (track 8)
- Percy L. Chapman - featured artist (track 7)
- Peter Pankey - featured artist (track 13)
- Phil Jordan - vocals (track 4)
- Rashita Wallace - additional vocals (track 8)
- Shaarod Ford - main artist
- Stephen Henderson - executive producer

== Charts ==
Chart (1999)	Peak position
Billboard Top R&B/Hip-Hop Albums	66
Billboard Top Heatseekers	16
