= Play Around =

Single by Lil' Cease featuring Lil' Kim, Joe Hooker and Mr. Bristal

from the album The Wonderful World of Cease A Leo
- Released: May 25, 1999
- Recorded: 1998
- Genre: Hip hop
- Length: 4:27
- Label: Atlantic
- Songwriters: James Lloyd, Kimberly Jones
- Producer: Bink Dogg

"Play Around" is the lead single released from Lil' Cease's debut album, The Wonderful World of Cease A Leo. The song was produced by Bink (then known as Bink Dogg) and featured Lil' Kim, Joe Hooker and Mr. Bristal. It is Lil Cease's only single.

The song was a hit on the Billboard Hot Rap Singles chart, peaking at number nine, though it was only a minor success on the R&B chart and did not reach the Billboard Hot 100. Nonetheless, it was the most successful single that Cease released during his short-lived solo career and reached the Billboard Year-End Hot Rap Singles of 1999 as one of the years most successful rap singles.

The music video was included as a bonus feature on the VHS release for Todd McFarlane's Spawn 3: The Ultimate Battle.

== Single track listing ==
1. "Play Around" (Rufftime Radio Remix) - 3:59
2. "Play Around" (Clean Radio Version) - 4:27
3. "Play Around" (Album Version) - 4:27
4. "Play Around" (Rufftime Remix Video Version) - 4:11

== Charts ==
=== Weekly charts ===
Chart (1999)	Peak position
Billboard Hot R&B/Hip-Hop Singles & Tracks	52
Billboard Hot Rap Singles	9

=== Year-end charts ===
Chart (1999)	Position
Billboard Hot Rap Singles	48
