= Blood Sweat and Years =

Studio album by JT Money
- Released: May 1, 2001
- Recorded: 2000–2001
- Studio: DARP Studios (Atlanta, GA); Triangle Sound (Atlanta, GA); Audio Vision Studios (Miami Beach, FL)
- Genre: Hip-hop
- Length: 51:41
- Label: Priority
- Producer: Cool & Dre; Dallas Austin; JT Money; Kerry Jackson; Red; Reggie Jackson; Rondel Rucker; Sam Sneed; Tricky Stewart

JT Money chronology
Pimpin' on Wax (1999)	Blood Sweat and Years (2001)	Return of the B-Izer (2002)

Professional ratings
Review scores
Source	Rating
AllMusic	3/5 stars
The Encyclopedia of Popular Music	3/5 stars
Los Angeles Times	3/4 stars
Orange County Register	C
The Source	3/5 stars
Vibe	3/5 stars

Blood Sweat and Years is the second solo studio album by American rapper JT Money. It was released in May 1, 2001 through Priority Records.

Blood Sweat and Years wasn't as successful as Money's previous album, peaking at No. 48 on the Billboard 200 and No. 9 on the Top R&B/Hip-Hop Albums. A single, "Hi-Lo", made it to No. 64 on the Hot R&B/Hip-Hop Singles & Tracks.

== Production ==
The album was produced by Dallas Austin, Sam Sneed, and C. Stewart.

== Critical reception ==
AllMusic wrote that "JT Money will never be mistaken for a lyrical giant like Rakim, but the fact that his lyrics are subpar will mean little to clubgoers who will appreciate the album for exactly what it is—an invitation to get on the dancefloor." The A.V. Club stated that the album finds JT "largely abandoning the pimped-out act that made his debut so entertaining in favor of a dour mixture of straightforward gangsta rap, tinny club anthems, and autobiographical storytelling." The Morning Call thought that "Money gets one very important thing right: Party rap should be about the crowd, not the rapper or his empire."

== Track listing ==
No.	Title	Writer(s)	Producer(s)	Length
1.	"Blood, Sweat and Years" (Intro)	Jeffrey Thompkins; Rondelle Rucker	Rondel Rucker	1:11
2.	"War"	Thompkins; Marcello Valenzano; Andre Lyon	Cool & Dre	4:40
3.	"Hi-Lo"	Thompkins; Christopher A. Stewart; Carlos Newsome	Tricky Stewart	4:09
4.	"Spanish Climax" (Interlude)	Thompkins	Kerry Jackson; Reggie Jackson	1:02
5.	"Sosa on That Chocha"	Thompkins; Valenzano; Lyon	Cool & Dre	4:08
6.	"Where My Thugs At" (featuring Lo)	Thompkins; Stewart; Raymond Freeman; Kareem Savage; Harrison Denny	Tricky Stewart	4:39
7.	"Superbitch"	Thompkins; Fiona Johnson; Samuel Anderson; Bud Lee	Sam Sneed	3:43
8.	"What Y'all Niggaz Want?"	Thompkins; Stewart	Tricky Stewart	4:03
9.	"Bustas and Haters"	Thompkins; Dallas Austin	Dallas Awesome	4:09
10.	"Lil' Charlie" (featuring Who You Callin' Country)	Thompkins; Austin; Donald Jackson; Elgin Wright; Exavious Cash	Dallas Awesome	4:39
11.	"Pimpburger" (Interlude)			1:19
12.	"I Like the Way" (featuring Dymond)	Thompkins; Austin	Dallas Awesome	3:42
13.	"Niggaz Better Run"	Thompkins; Redwin A. Wilchomb; Newsome; Savage	Red	3:52
14.	"Father to Son"	Thompkins; Austin; Kerry Jackson; Reginald Jackson; Maurice White; Charles Stepney; Verdine White	Dallas Awesome; JT Money	4:15
15.	"Blood, Sweat and Years" (Outro)	Thompkins; Rucker	Rondel Rucker	2:10
Total length:				51:41
