= Return of the B-Izer =

Studio album by JT Money
- Released: September 24, 2002
- Genre: Hip hop
- Length: 73:53
- Label: Crunk City
- Producer: Renard "Church Boi" Hughes; Natural

JT Money chronology
Blood Sweat and Years (2001)	Return of the B-Izer (2002)	Undeniable (2005)

Singles from Return of the B-Izer
- 1. "Chevy Game / Why Cross 'Em / Sure Shot Baby"

Return of the B-Izer is the third album by American rapper JT Money. It was released on September 24, 2002, was produced by Renard "Church Boi" Hughes and Natural, and engineered by Disco Rick and Hughes as well.

== Track listing ==
Track	Title	Writers	Length
1	Intro (feat. Malik and Bobby Brown)		1:01
2	Come Clean	JT Money	3:31
3	You My Ho (feat. Kymistry)	Cleveland Bell; JT Money	4:25
4	Why Cross 'Em (feat. Nutt)	JT Money	4:00
5	Good Side of the Game	JT Money	4:03
6	Run Da Yard	JT Money	4:25
7	Sure Shot Baby (feat. Kenny Brown)	JT Money	4:01
8	Chevy Game (feat. Nutt)	JT Money	
9	Booty Phone		0:57
10	What Y'all Wanna Get	JT Money	3:55
11	Who's Fuckin Yo Ho	JT Money	3:59
12	Get Ya Own Money	JT Money	3:51
13	Cutt You (feat. Nutt)	JT Money	4:49
14	Boy Hush (feat. Redd)	Cleveland Bell; JT Money	4:32
15	Pimp Shit (feat. Kymistry)	Cleveland Bell; JT Money	4:53
16	Shake Somethin	JT Money	4:02
17	Hood Thangs	JT Money	4:32
18	Mama Dearest (feat. Wayne)	Cleveland Bell; JT Money	
19	What You See (feat. Mr. Niles)	Danny Elfman; Lawrence King; JT Money	3:32
20	Outro	Lawrence King; JT Money	0:28

== Personnel ==
- Kevin Parker - Mixing
- Fred Reeves - Photography
- JT Money - Executive Producer
- Natural - Producer
- Damon Forbes - Executive Producer
- Renard "Church Boi" Hughes - Producer, Mixing Assistant, Engineer
- Disco Rick - Engineer, A&R
