= The Wonderful World of Cease A Leo =

Studio album by Lil' Cease
- Released: July 13, 1999
- Recorded: 1998–1999
- Studio: Daddy's House Recording Studios; The Hit Factory; Sound on Sound Studios; Compass Point Studios (Bahamas, WI); Lion's Den Recording Studios
- Genre: Hip-hop
- Length: 1:06:38
- Label: Undeas; Queen Bee; Atlantic
- Producer: Alex "Algee" DeVaughn; Bink!; Darrell "Digga" Branch; D-Dot; EZ Elpee; Jay "Waxx" Garfield; Lil' Cease; Mario Winans; Nashiem Myrick; Prestige; Sean "Puffy" Combs; Six July; Spunk Bigga

Singles from The Wonderful World of Cease A Leo
- 1. "Play Around" Released: June 8, 1999; 2. "Chicken Heads" Released: 1999

The Wonderful World of Cease A Leo is the only solo studio album by American rapper Lil' Cease. It was released on July 13, 1999 through Queen Bee/Atlantic Records.

Production was handled by Mario Winans, Nashiem Myrick, Bink!, Deric "D-Dot" Angelettie, EZ Elpee, Jay "Waxx" Garfield, Daven "Prestige" Vanderpool, P. Diddy, Alex "Algee" DeVaughn, Carlos "Six July" Broady, Darrell "Digga" Branch, Spunk Bigga and Lil' Cease himself.

It features guest appearances from his fellow Junior M.A.F.I.A. groupmates Blake C, Larce "Banger" Vegas and Lil' Kim, as well as Mr. Bristal, Joe Hooker, Puff Daddy, 112, Busta Rhymes, Carl Thomas, G. Dep, Jay-Z, Kelly Price and Redman.

In the United States, the album peaked at number 26 on the Billboard 200 and number 3 on the Top R&B/Hip-Hop Albums charts. Its lead single, "Play Around", made it to number 52 on the Hot R&B/Hip-Hop Songs and number 9 on the Hot Rap Songs charts.

== Critical reception ==
Professional ratings
Review scores
Source	Rating
AllMusic	2.5/5 stars
Entertainment Weekly	C
Los Angeles Times	2/4 stars
RapReviews	6/10
Rolling Stone	3/5 stars
The Source	3.5/5 stars

The Wonderful World of Cease A Leo received mixed reviews from music critics. Keith Farley of AllMusic called it "a hardcore journey that never lacks on bass, beats, or party jams". Kris Ex, in his review for Rolling Stone, commended Lil Cease for his "cherubic wit" that "softens the nastiness of lyrics". The Source's Elon D. Johnson called The Wonderful World of Cease A Leo "an honest effort". She praised Lil Cease's "charismatic lyricism", but criticized the album's outro, as well as its overall reliance on sampling.

Writing for Los Angeles Times, Soren Baker described the album as "uneven" and "party-tinged". He believed that Lil Cease had a strong performance on several tracks, reaching the level of his mentor the Notorious B.I.G, but panned the rest of the album for "weak choruses, bland production and recycled story lines". Tom Sinclair of Entertainment Weekly was critical of the album, saying that Lil Cease has "nothing novel to say, but at least his superstar buddies [...] add wattage". In a retrospective review, Steve Juon of RapReviews shared this view. He wrote that the album "doesn't make sense", as he believed that other featured artists outperformed Lil Cease.

== Track listing ==
No.	Title	Writer(s)	Producer(s)	Length
1.	"No Intro (Intro)"	James Lloyd; Deric Angelettie; Damien Butler	Lil' Cease; Deric "D-Dot" Angelettie	0:54
2.	"More Dangerous" (featuring Busta Rhymes, Mr. Bristal and G. Dep)	Lloyd; Trevor Smith; Jamel Fisher; Trevell Coleman; Nashiem Myrick; Jay Garfield	Nashiem Myrick; J. "Waxx" Garfield	4:54
3.	"Get Out Our Way" (featuring Puff Daddy and Blake C)	Lloyd; Sean Combs; Rayshaun Spain; Lamont Porter; Nile Rodgers; Bernard Edwards	EZ Elpee	5:34
4.	"Future Sport" (featuring Redman, Mr. Bristal and Joe Hooker)	Lloyd; Reginald Noble; Fisher; Harve Pierre; Mario Winans; Alan Gorrie; Malcolm Duncan; Hamish Stuart; Roger Ball; Robert McIntosh	Mario "Yellowman" Winans	3:37
5.	"Looking for a Lady" (featuring Blake C)	Lloyd; R. Spain; Porter	EZ Elpee	5:02
6.	"Long Time Comin'" (featuring Mr. Bristal and Larce "Banger" Vegas)	Lloyd; Fisher; Antoine Spain; Roosevelt Harrell	Bink!	4:49
7.	"Girlfriend" (featuring Kelly Price)	Lloyd; Winans; Robert Kelly	Mario "Yellowman" Winans; Lil' Cease	3:54
8.	"Play Around" (featuring Lil' Kim, Mr. Bristal and Joe Hooker)	Lloyd; Kimberly Jones; Fisher; Pierre; Harrell	Bink!	4:27
9.	"Chicken Heads" (featuring Carl Thomas)	Lloyd; Myrick; Garfield; Michael Jones	Nashiem Myrick; J. "Waxx" Garfield	3:56
10.	"4 My Niggaz" (featuring Jay-Z, Blake C and Mr. Bristal)	Lloyd; Shawn Carter; R. Spain; Fisher; Daven Vanderpool	Daven "Prestige" Vanderpool; Sean "Puffy" Combs	3:53
11.	"Work It Out"	Lloyd; Anthony Blagmon	Spunk Bigga	4:31
12.	"Jail (Interlude)"	Lloyd; Alex DeVaughn	Lil' Cease; Alex "Algee" DeVaughn	1:05
13.	"Mr. Nasty"	Lloyd; Darrell Branch; Lawrence Parker; Scott Sterling; John Fletcher; Lawrence Smith; Jalil Hutchins	Darrell "Digga" Branch	4:31
14.	"Dolly Baby"	Lloyd; Winans; Keisha Spivey	Mario "Yellowman" Winans	3:52
15.	"Don't Stop" (featuring Puff Daddy)	Lloyd; Combs; Vanderpool; Andre A. Brown; Eric McIntosh	Daven "Prestige" Vanderpool; Sean "Puffy" Combs	4:03
16.	"Everything" (featuring 112)	Lloyd; Myrick; Thom Bell; Linda Creed	Nashiem Myrick; Six July	5:11
17.	"B.I.G. & Cease Forever (Outro)"	Lloyd; Angelettie	Deric "D-Dot" Angelettie	0:43
Total length:				1:06:38

Samples used

- "More Dangerous" contains a sample from "Warning" by The Notorious B.I.G.
- "Get Out Our Way" contains samples from "Now That You're Gone" by Diana Ross and "Cherish the Day" by Sade.
- "Future Sport" contains a sample from "More Funky Stuff" by Kool & the Gang.
- "Lookin' for a Lady" contains a sample from "Big Stars" by Ronnie Laws.
- "Long Time Comin" contains a sample from "Zungguzungguzungguzeng" by Yellowman.
- "Girlfriend" contains samples from "Not Gonna Hold On" by R. Kelly and "Be Happy" by Mary J. Blige.
- "Chicken Heads" contains samples from "The Mood" by Kashif and "A Little Bit of Love Is All It Takes" by New Edition.
- "4 My Niggaz" contains a samples from "Trans-Europe Express" by Kraftwerk, "Al-Naafiysh" by Hashim and "Computer Game" by Yellow Magic Orchestra.
- "Work It Out" contains a sample from "We Had to Break Away" by Twennynine and Lenny White.
- "Mr. Nasty" contains samples from "Super Hoe" by Boogie Down Productions and "Super Sporm" by Captain Sky.
- "Everything" contains a sample from "You Are Everything" by The Stylistics.
- "Don't Stop" contains a sample from "Knowledge Me" by Original Concept.

== Charts ==
Chart (1999)	Peak position
US Billboard 200	26
US Top R&B/Hip-Hop Albums (Billboard)	3
