= Cheapskate (You Ain't Gettin' Nada) =

1998 single by Sporty Thievz

Single by Sporty Thievz

from the album Street Cinema
- B-side: "Raw Footage"
- Released: July 30, 1998
- Recorded: 1998
- Genre: Hip hop
- Length: 3:50
- Label: Ruffhouse; Columbia
- Songwriters: King Kirk; Marlon Brando; Big Dubez
- Producer: Ski

Sporty Thievz singles chronology
"Cheapskate (You Ain't Gettin' Nada)" (1998)	"No Pigeons" (1999)

"Cheapskate (You Ain't Gettin' Nada)" is the first single released from the Sporty Thievz debut album, Street Cinema. Produced by Ski, the song's lyrics are similar to that of their follow-up smash hit, "No Pigeons", with the song making reference to the fact that the members are not willing to buy expensive materials for any women. The original made it to both the R&B and rap charts.

A remix entitled "Even Cheaper" was also released as a single. It was also produced by Ski and featured verses from female rappers, Liz Leite and Mocha. It also made it to the Billboard charts, peaking at 27 on the Hot Rap Singles.

== Single track listing ==
=== A-Side ===
1. "Cheapskate" (L.P. Version)- 3:50
2. "Cheapskate" (Clean Version)- 3:52
3. "Cheapskate" (Instrumental)- 3:52

=== B-Side ===
1. "Raw Footage" (L.P. Version)- 4:59
2. "Raw Footage" (Clean Version)- 4:59
3. "Raw Footage" (instrumental)- 4:59

== Charts ==
Cheapskate (You Ain't Gettin' Nada)

Chart (1998)	Peak position
Billboard Hot R&B/Hip-Hop Singles & Tracks	49
Billboard Hot Rap Singles	31

Even Cheaper

Chart (1998)	Peak position
Billboard Hot Rap Singles	27
