= It Wasn't Me (Solé song) =

Single by Solé featuring Ginuwine

from the album Skin Deep
- Released: March 14, 2000
- Recorded: 1999
- Genre: Hip hop
- Length: 3:30
- Label: DreamWorks
- Songwriters: Elgin Lumpkin, Tonya Johnston
- Producer: Christopher "Tricky" Stewart

Solé singles chronology
"4, 5, 6" (1999)	"It Wasn't Me" (2000)	"Never Had" (2001)

Ginuwine singles chronology
"The Best Man I Can Be" (1999)	"It Wasn't Me" (2000)	"You Owe Me" (2000)

"It Wasn't Me" is the second single released from Solé's debut album, Skin Deep, it was first released on March 14, 2000, to Urban radio after February magazines were promoting it the upcoming single. It was produced by Christopher "Tricky" Stewart and featured a guest verse from Ginuwine and the album version featured J-Weav. The song was a minor hit peaking at number three on the Billboard Bubbling Under Hot 100 chart, number forty-four on Billboard Hot R&B/Hip-Hop Songs chart, twenty-six on Billboard Mainstream R&B/Hip-Hop chart and nineteen on Billboard Rhythmic.

== Single track listing ==
CD Single 2000

1. "It Wasn't Me" (Radio Edit) - 3:30
2. "It Wasn't Me" (Main Version) - 3:30
3. "It Wasn't Me" (Instrumental Version) - 3:30
4. "It Wasn't Me" (A Cappella) - 3:19

== Commercial performance ==
The song was featured on the list of the most-played clips on BET and played on The Box for the week end of April 10.

== Charts ==
Chart (2000)	Peak position
Billboard Bubbling Under Hot 100	3
Billboard Hot R&B/Hip-Hop Songs	44
Billboard Mainstream R&B/Hip-Hop	26
Billboard Rhythmic Top 40	19
Billboard R&B/Hip-Hop Airplay	37
Billboard Rap Airplay	9
