= Pimpin' on Wax =

Studio album by JT Money
- Released: May 25, 1999
- Genre: Hip hop; gangsta rap; dirty rap
- Length: 51:17
- Label: Priority
- Producer: Dallas Austin; Christoper "Tricky" Stewart; JT Money; Kevin "She'kspere" Briggs

JT Money chronology
| Pimpin' on Wax (1999) | Blood Sweat and Years (2001) |

Pimpin' on Wax is the debut solo studio album by American rapper JT Money. It was released on May 25, 1999, through Priority Records. Production was handled by Kevin "She'kspere" Briggs, Christoper "Tricky" Stewart, Dallas Austin and JT Money himself. It features guest appearances from Anthony Hamilton, Big Gipp, Evil, Solé, Too Short and Trick Daddy.

The album peaked at No. 28 on the Billboard 200 and No. 8 on the Top R&B/Hip-Hop Albums. The single "Who Dat" featuring rapper Solé made it to number 5 on the Billboard Hot 100, number 2 on the Hot R&B/Hip-Hop Singles & Tracks and number 1 on the Hot Rap Tracks. "Who Dat" was certified gold by the Recording Industry Association of America on September 30, 1999.

== Critical reception ==
Professional ratings
Review scores
| Source | Rating |
|---|---|
| AllMusic | 2.5/5 stars |
| Entertainment Weekly | B− |
| The Source | 3/5 stars |

Pimpin' on Wax received mostly positive reviews from music critics. Entertainment Weekly's Matt Diehl praised the album's "booming Miami bass beats". Stephen Thomas Erlewine of AllMusic was more critical, as he believed the album's production lacked diversity. Laini Madhubuti, in a review for The Source, critiqued the lack of depth in the album's lyrics, but commended it for its guest appearances. She concluded: "Despite the lack of variety and originality, Pimpin' On Wax is simply entertaining."

== Track listing ==
| No. | Title | Writer(s) | Producer(s) | Length |
|---|---|---|---|---|
| 1. | "Pimp Vs. USA" (Interlude) | Jeffrey Thompkins | Kevin "She'kspere" Briggs | 1:13 |
| 2. | "Playa Ass Shit" | Thompkins; Christopher Stewart | Tricky Stewart | 4:34 |
| 3. | "Who Dat" (featuring Solé and The Red Zone Clique) | Thompkins; Tonya Johnston; Di'Andre Davis; Stewart | Tricky Stewart | 3:52 |
| 4. | "On da Grind" (featuring Anthony Hamilton) | Thompkins; Anthony Hamilton; Dallas Austin; Curtis Mayfield; Tim Patterson | Dallas Austin | 4:31 |
| 5. | "Poetry Moment" (Interlude) | Thompkins | Kevin "She'kspere" Briggs | 1:55 |
| 6. | "Ho Problems" | Thompkins; Kevin Briggs | Kevin "She'kspere" Briggs | 3:45 |
| 7. | "Too Real" (featuring Evil) | Thompkins; Tony Mercedes; Erica Harrison | JT Money | 4:30 |
| 8. | "Alright" (featuring Big Gipp) | Thompkins; Cameron Gipp; Briggs | Kevin "She'kspere" Briggs | 4:48 |
| 9. | "Pimp Matrimony" (Interlude) | Thompkins | Kevin "She'kspere" Briggs | 1:43 |
| 10. | "Something 'bout Pimpin'" (featuring Too $hort) | Thompkins; Todd Shaw; Briggs; Norman Durham | Kevin "She'kspere" Briggs | 3:45 |
| 11. | "Rap Ass Nigga" | Thompkins; Austin | Dallas Austin | 3:45 |
| 12. | "Dank" (featuring Trick Daddy Dollars) | Thompkins; Maurice Young; Austin | Dallas Austin | 3:54 |
| 13. | "Kite 2 da Boys" | Thompkins; Briggs | Kevin "She'kspere" Briggs | 4:59 |
| 14. | "Watcha Want" | Thompkins; Stewart | Tricky Stewart | 4:03 |
| Total length: | | | | 51:17 |

== Personnel ==
- Jeffrey "JT Money" Thompkins – main artist, producer (track 7)
- Tonya "Solé" Johnston – featured artist (track 3)
- Anthony Hamilton – featured artist (track 4)
- Evil – featured artist (track 7)
- Cameron Gipp – featured artist (track 8)
- Todd "Too $hort" Shaw – featured artist (track 10)
- Maurice "Trick Daddy" Young – featured artist (track 12)
- The Red Zone Clique – backing vocals (track 3)
- G-Boy – backing vocals (track 4)
- Kevin "She'kspere" Briggs – producer (tracks: 1, 5, 6, 8–10, 13), recording (tracks: 6, 8, 10, 13)
- Christoper "Tricky" Stewart – producer & recording (tracks: 2, 3, 14)
- Dallas Austin – producer (tracks: 4, 11, 12), executive producer, art direction, A&R
- Shawn Grove – recording (tracks: 1, 5, 9)
- Kevin Davis – mixing (tracks: 1, 2, 5, 6, 9, 10, 13, 14)
- Leslie Brathwaite – mixing (tracks: 3, 8), recording (track 4)
- Ricciano "Ricco" Lumpkins – recording (track 4), mixing (tracks: 4, 11, 12)
- Carlton Lynn – recording (tracks: 4, 11, 12)
- Alvin Speights – mixing (track 6)
- Brian Hood – recording (track 7)
- Ray Seay – mixing (track 7)
- Brian "Big Bass" Gardner – mastering
- Tony Mercedes – executive producer, A&R
- Colin Jahn – art direction
- David Gates – art direction
- Ernest Washington – photography
- Colin Wolfe – bass
- Tomi Martin – guitar
- Mark "Exit" Goodchild – mixing assistant, recording
- Stuart Gordon – mixing, recording
- John Horesco – assistant engineer, mixing assistant, recording
- Ty Hudson – assistant engineer
- Danny Kresco – mixing assistant
- Andrew Lyn – assistant engineer, recording
- Vernon J. Mungo – mixing assistant
- Jason Piske – mixing assistant
- Claudine Pontier – mixing assistant
- Rick Sheppard – midi, sound design

== Charts ==
=== Weekly charts ===
| Chart (1999) | Peak position |
|---|---|
| US Billboard 200 | 28 |
| US Top R&B/Hip-Hop Albums (Billboard) | 8 |

=== Year-end charts ===
| Chart (1999) | Position |
|---|---|
| US Top R&B/Hip-Hop Albums (Billboard) | 90 |
