= List of Billboard Hot 100 number ones of 1999 =

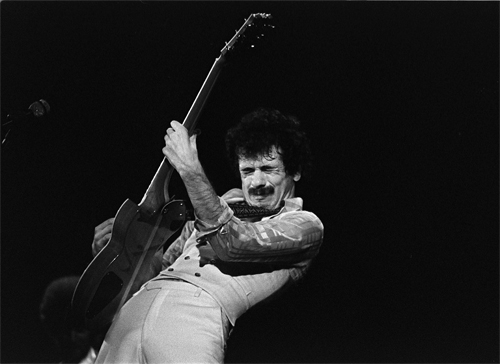
Santana and Rob Thomas' "Smooth" was the longest-running single of 1999, topping the chart for 10 consecutive weeks.

The Billboard Hot 100 is a chart that ranks the best singles of the United States. Published by Billboard magazine, the data are compiled by Nielsen SoundScan based collectively on each single's weekly physical sales and airplays. There were 15 singles that topped the chart this year. The first of these, "I'm Your Angel" by R. Kelly and Celine Dion, spent two weeks at the top, concluding a six-week run that had begun in December 1998.

During the year, 11 acts had achieved a first U.S. number-one single, including: Britney Spears, Ricky Martin, Jennifer Lopez, Destiny's Child, Dru Hill, Kool Moe Dee, Christina Aguilera, Enrique Iglesias, Jay-Z, Santana, and Rob Thomas. The longest running number-one single is "Smooth" by Santana featuring Matchbox Twenty frontman Rob Thomas, which attained 12 weeks at number-one. Ten of those weeks were logged in 1999 and two additional weeks were logged in 2000.

TLC was the only act with more than one number one song, with them hitting the top twice.

== Chart history ==
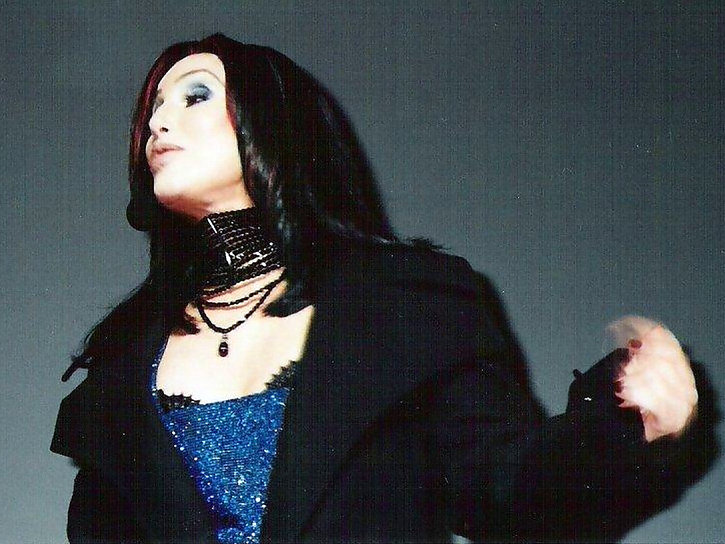
Pop singer Cher earned her first number-one single since 1974 and fifth overall when "Believe" topped the chart.

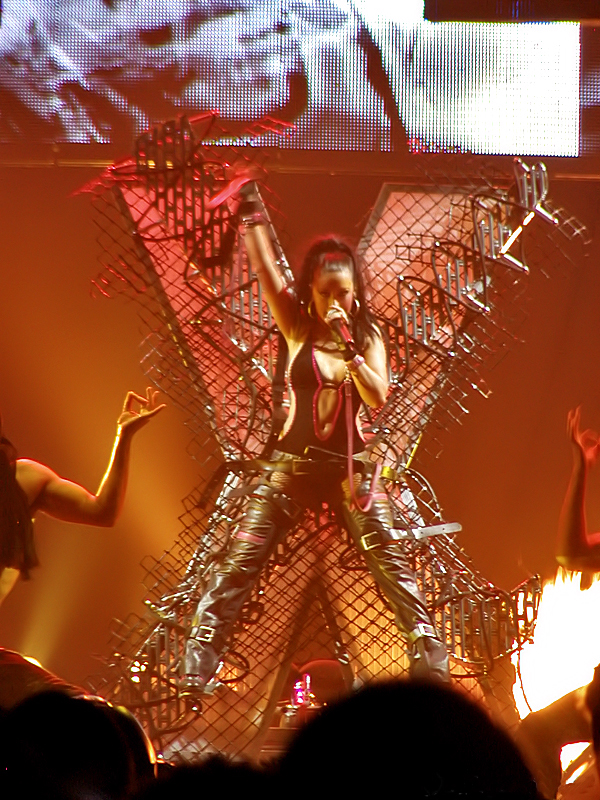
Pop singer Christina Aguilera earned her first U.S. number-one single, "Genie in a Bottle".

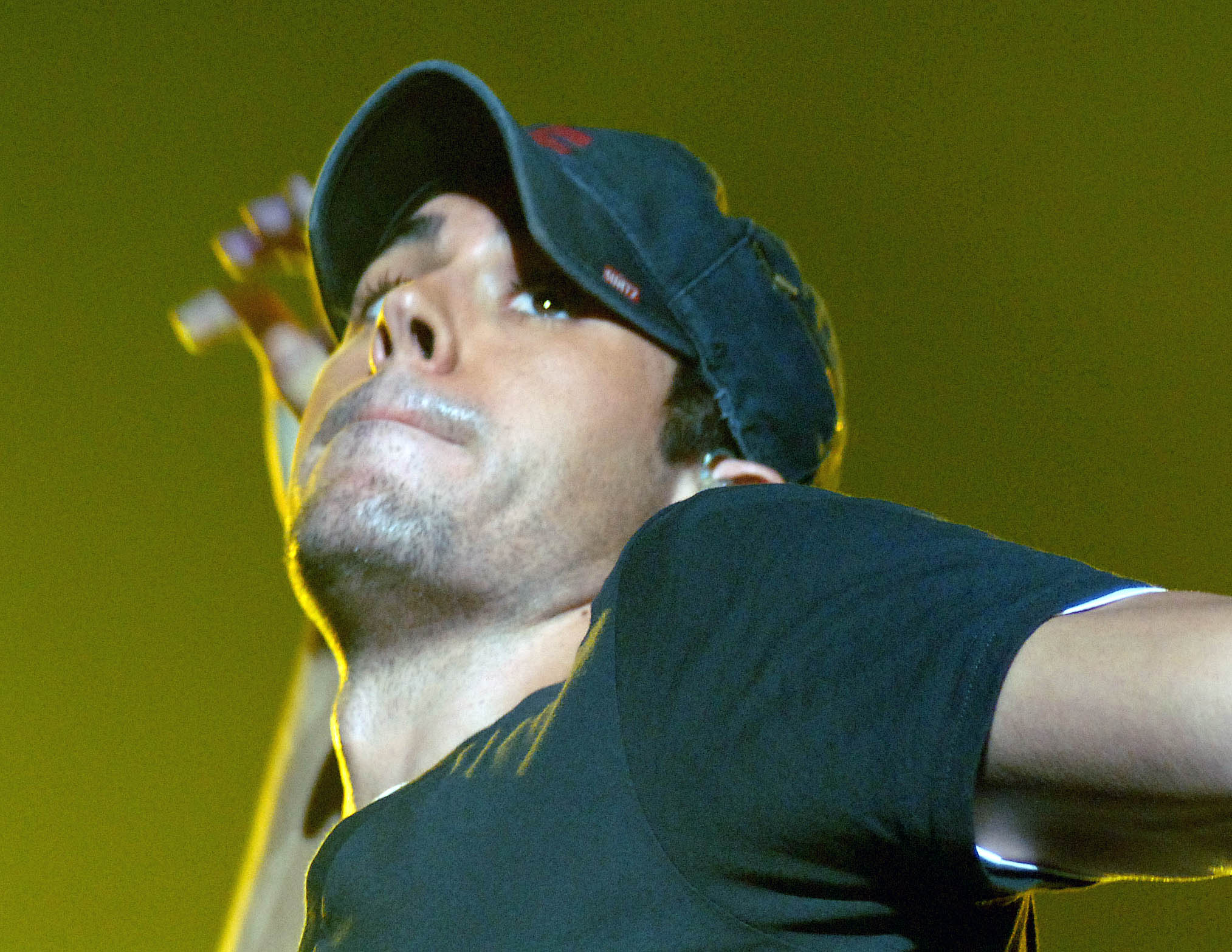
Spanish singer Enrique Iglesias earned his first U.S. number-one single with "Bailamos" which stayed for two consecutive weeks.

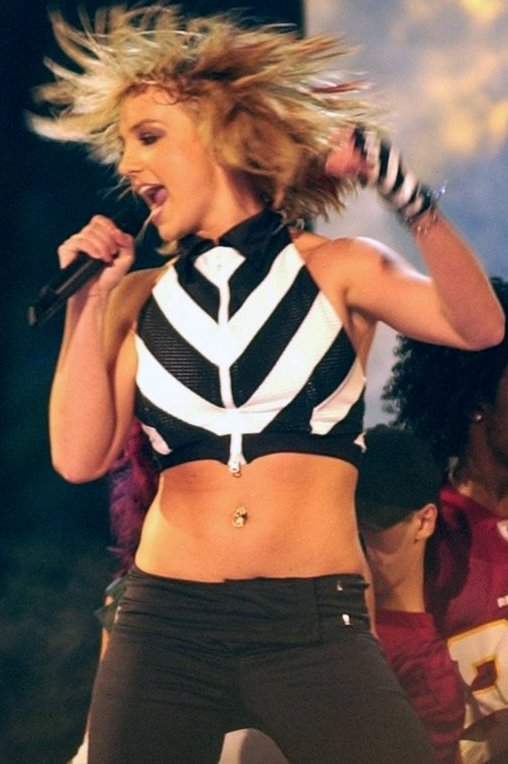
Pop singer Britney Spears earned her first U.S. number-one peak with "...Baby One More Time".

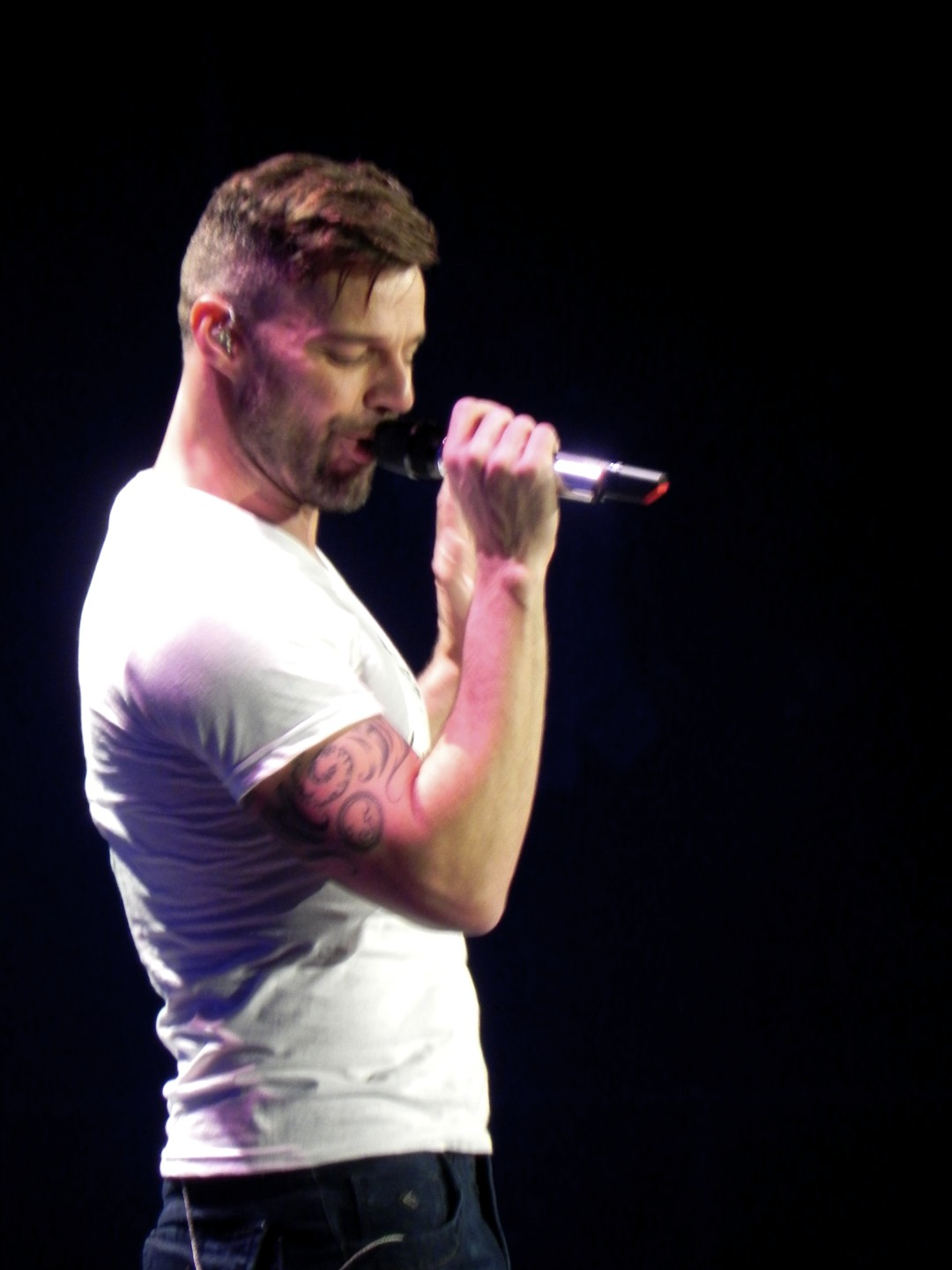
Singer Ricky Martin earned his first U.S. number-one single with "Livin' la Vida Loca".

Key
| † | Indicates best-performing single of 1999 |

| No. | Issue date | Song | Artist(s) | Ref. |
|---|---|---|---|---|
| 836 | January 2 | "I'm Your Angel" | R. Kelly and Céline Dion | |
| 836 | January 9 | "I'm Your Angel" | R. Kelly and Céline Dion | |
| 837 | January 16 | "Have You Ever?" | Brandy | |
| 837 | January 23 | "Have You Ever?" | Brandy | |
| 838 | January 30 | "...Baby One More Time" | Britney Spears | |
| 838 | February 6 | "...Baby One More Time" | Britney Spears | |
| 839 | February 13 | "Angel of Mine" | Monica | |
| 839 | February 20 | "Angel of Mine" | Monica | |
| 839 | February 27 | "Angel of Mine" | Monica | |
| 839 | March 6 | "Angel of Mine" | Monica | |
| 840 | March 13 | "Believe"† | Cher | |
| 840 | March 20 | "Believe"† | Cher | |
| 840 | March 27 | "Believe"† | Cher | |
| 840 | April 3 | "Believe"† | Cher | |
| 841 | April 10 | "No Scrubs" | TLC | |
| 841 | April 17 | "No Scrubs" | TLC | |
| 841 | April 24 | "No Scrubs" | TLC | |
| 841 | May 1 | "No Scrubs" | TLC | |
| 842 | May 8 | "Livin' la Vida Loca" | Ricky Martin | |
| 842 | May 15 | "Livin' la Vida Loca" | Ricky Martin | |
| 842 | May 22 | "Livin' la Vida Loca" | Ricky Martin | |
| 842 | May 29 | "Livin' la Vida Loca" | Ricky Martin | |
| 842 | June 5 | "Livin' la Vida Loca" | Ricky Martin | |
| 843 | June 12 | "If You Had My Love" | Jennifer Lopez | |
| 843 | June 19 | "If You Had My Love" | Jennifer Lopez | |
| 843 | June 26 | "If You Had My Love" | Jennifer Lopez | |
| 843 | July 3 | "If You Had My Love" | Jennifer Lopez | |
| 843 | July 10 | "If You Had My Love" | Jennifer Lopez | |
| 844 | July 17 | "Bills, Bills, Bills" | Destiny's Child | |
| 845 | July 24 | "Wild Wild West" | Will Smith featuring Dru Hill and Kool Moe Dee | |
| 846 | July 31 | "Genie in a Bottle" | Christina Aguilera | |
| 846 | August 7 | "Genie in a Bottle" | Christina Aguilera | |
| 846 | August 14 | "Genie in a Bottle" | Christina Aguilera | |
| 846 | August 21 | "Genie in a Bottle" | Christina Aguilera | |
| 846 | August 28 | "Genie in a Bottle" | Christina Aguilera | |
| 847 | September 4 | "Bailamos" | Enrique Iglesias | |
| 847 | September 11 | "Bailamos" | Enrique Iglesias | |
| 848 | September 18 | "Unpretty" | TLC | |
| 848 | September 25 | "Unpretty" | TLC | |
| 848 | October 2 | "Unpretty" | TLC | |
| 849 | October 9 | "Heartbreaker" | Mariah Carey featuring Jay-Z | |
| 849 | October 16 | "Heartbreaker" | Mariah Carey featuring Jay-Z | |
| 850 | October 23 | "Smooth" | Santana featuring Rob Thomas | |
| 850 | October 30 | "Smooth" | Santana featuring Rob Thomas | |
| 850 | November 6 | "Smooth" | Santana featuring Rob Thomas | |
| 850 | November 13 | "Smooth" | Santana featuring Rob Thomas | |
| 850 | November 20 | "Smooth" | Santana featuring Rob Thomas | |
| 850 | November 27 | "Smooth" | Santana featuring Rob Thomas | |
| 850 | December 4 | "Smooth" | Santana featuring Rob Thomas | |
| 850 | December 11 | "Smooth" | Santana featuring Rob Thomas | |
| 850 | December 18 | "Smooth" | Santana featuring Rob Thomas | |
| 850 | December 25 | "Smooth" | Santana featuring Rob Thomas | |

== Number-one artists ==
List of number-one artists by total weeks at number one
| Position | Artist | Weeks at No. 1 |
|---|---|---|
| 1 | Santana | 10 |
| 1 | Rob Thomas | 10 |
| 3 | TLC | 7 |
| 4 | Ricky Martin | 5 |
| 4 | Jennifer Lopez | 5 |
| 4 | Christina Aguilera | 5 |
| 7 | Monica | 4 |
| 7 | Cher | 4 |
| 9 | R. Kelly | 2 |
| 9 | Céline Dion | 2 |
| 9 | Brandy | 2 |
| 9 | Britney Spears | 2 |
| 9 | Enrique Iglesias | 2 |
| 9 | Mariah Carey | 2 |
| 9 | Jay-Z | 2 |
| 16 | Destiny's Child | 1 |
| 16 | Will Smith | 1 |
| 16 | Dru Hill | 1 |
| 16 | Kool Moe Dee | 1 |

== See also ==
- 1999 in music
- List of Billboard number-one singles
- Billboard Year-End Hot 100 singles of 1999
- List of Billboard Hot 100 top 10 singles in 1999
- List of Billboard Hot 100 number-one singles of the 1990s

== Additional sources ==
- Fred Bronson's Billboard Book of Number 1 Hits, 5th Edition (ISBN 0-8230-7677-6)
- Joel Whitburn's Top Pop Singles 1955-2008, 12 Edition (ISBN 0-89820-180-2)
- Joel Whitburn Presents the Billboard Hot 100 Charts: The Nineties (ISBN 0-89820-137-3)
- Additional information obtained can be verified within Billboard's online archive services and print editions of the magazine.
