= 4, 5, 6 =

Single by Solé featuring JT Money and Kandi

from the album Skin Deep
- B-side: "Da Story"
- Released: October 12, 1999
- Recorded: 1999
- Genre: Hip hop
- Length: 4:19
- Label: DreamWorks
- Songwriters: Jeff Thompkins, Tonya Johnston
- Producer: Christopher "Tricky" Stewart

Solé singles chronology
"Who Dat" (1999)	"4, 5, 6" (1999)	"It Wasn't Me" (2000)

Kandi singles chronology
"4, 5, 6" (1999)	"Don't Think I'm Not" (2000)

"4, 5, 6" is the first single released from Solé's debut album, Skin Deep. It was produced by Christopher "Tricky" Stewart and featured a guest verse from JT Money and a chorus by Kandi. This was Solé's second collaboration with JT Money and Stewart, as the three had worked together on JT Money's hit single "Who Dat" the previous year

The song was a success, peaking at number 21 on the Billboard Hot 100 while also topping the Billboard Hot Rap Singles chart. "4, 5, 6" was certified gold by the Recording Industry Association of America (RIAA) for selling over 500,000 copies in the year of 2000. It was one of the most successful rap songs of the year 2000, reaching number two on the Billboard Year-End Hot Rap Singles of 2000, only behind Missy Elliott's "Hot Boyz".

== Single track listing ==
=== A-Side ===
1. "4, 5, 6" (Radio Edit) - 3:17
2. "4,5,6" (Clean Album Edit) - 4:19

=== B-Side ===
1. "Da Story" (Clean Version) - 3:47

== Charts ==
=== Weekly charts ===
Chart (1999)	Peak position
Billboard Hot 100	21
Billboard Hot R&B/Hip-Hop Songs	9
Billboard Hot Rap Singles	1
Billboard Mainstream R&B/Hip-Hop	29
Billboard Rhythmic Top 40	24
Billboard R&B/Hip-Hop Airplay	42
Billboard Rap Airplay	13

=== Year-end charts ===
Chart (2000)	Position
Billboard Hot R&B/Hip-Hop Singles & Tracks	95
Billboard Hot Rap Singles	2
