= No Pigeons =

1999 single by Sporty Thievz

Single by Sporty Thievz

from the album Street Cinema
- B-side: "Cheapskate (You Ain't Gettin' Nada)"
- Released: May 1999
- Recorded: March 1999; D.A.R.P. Studios (Atlanta, Georgia)
- Genre: Hip hop; R&B; dance-pop
- Length: 4:24 (album version); 3:26 (mix version)
- Label: Ruffhouse
- Songwriters: Diallo "Mr. Wood$" Edmond; Kevin "She'kspere" Briggs, Kandi Burruss; Tameka Cottle; Marlon "Robin Hood" Brando
- Producer: Kevin "She'kspere" Briggs

Sporty Thievz singles chronology
"Cheapskate (You Ain't Gettin' Nada)"	"No Pigeons"

Music video
- "No Pigeons" on YouTube

"No Pigeons" is a song by American hip-hop trio Sporty Thievz from their debut studio album, Street Cinema (1999). A rebuttal to TLC's smash hit single "No Scrubs", it peaked at No. 12 on the U.S. Billboard Hot 100, at about the same time the TLC single was enjoying a successful chart run.

== Music video ==
Shot in March 1999 and partially filmed in the Parkchester section of the Bronx, the video features female rapper Eve, Gang Starr's Guru, Ras Kass and Harlem World rapper Blinky Blink.

== Charts and certifications ==
=== Weekly charts ===
Chart (1999)	Peak position
Canadian Digital Sales	3
Netherlands (Single Top 100)	57
Sweden (Sverigetopplistan)	58
UK Singles (Official Charts)	16
U.S. Billboard Hot 100	12
U.S. Billboard Hot R&B/Hip-Hop Songs	5
U.S. Billboard Hot Rap Singles	1
U.S. Billboard Hot R&B/Hip-Hop Singles Sales	1

=== Certifications ===
Region	Certification	Certified units/sales
United States (RIAA)	Gold	600,000
