= Who Dat (JT Money song) =

Single by JT Money featuring Solé

from the album Pimpin' on Wax
- B-side: "Pimp Matrimony"
- Released: February 9, 1999
- Recorded: 1998
- Genre: Hip hop
- Length: 3:52
- Label: Priority
- Songwriters: Jeff Thompkins, Tonya Johnston, Thabiso Nkhereanye, DiAndre Davis
- Producer: Christopher "Tricky" Stewart

JT Money singles chronology
"Who Dat" (1999)	"4, 5, 6" (1999)

"Who Dat" is a song by American rapper JT Money, released by Priority Records on February 9, 1999 as the lead single from the rapper's debut album, Pimpin' on Wax (1999). It features a guest appearance from fellow rapper Solé, and production from then-unknown Christopher "Tricky" Stewart. The song was included on the soundtrack to the 2001 film Bully.

"Who Dat" peaked at Billboard Hot 100, becoming JT Money's only song as a lead artist to enter the chart. On September 30, 1999, "Who Dat" was certified Gold by the RIAA; it has since sold 900,000 copies. It was top-performing hip-hop song of that year, reaching number-one on the Billboard Year-End Hot Rap Singles of 1999.

Later in the year, JT Money, Solé and Stewart collaborated on another top-40 single, "4, 5, 6", which appeared on Solé's album, Skin Deep (1999). Despite Solé only guest appearing on "Who Dat", the track was issued as the lead single from Skin Deep in the US.

== Single track listing ==
=== A-Side ===
1. "Who Dat" (Main Mix)- 3:54
2. "Who Dat" (Instrumental)- 3:54

=== B-Side ===
1. "Who Dat" (Clean Mix)- 3:54
2. "Who Dat" (Accapella)- 3:54
3. "Pimp Matrimony" (Interlude)- 1:43

== Charts and certifications ==
=== Weekly charts ===
Chart (1999)	Peak position
Billboard Hot 100	5
Billboard Hot R&B/Hip-Hop Singles & Tracks	2
Billboard Hot Rap Singles	1
Billboard Rhythmic Top 40	22

=== Year-end charts ===
Chart (1999)	Position
U.S. Billboard Hot 100	55
U.S. Billboard Hot Rap Singles	1

=== Certifications ===
Region	Certification	Certified units/sales
United States (RIAA)	Gold	900,000
