= Satisfy You (Puff Daddy song) =

1999 single by Puff Daddy

Single by Puff Daddy featuring R. Kelly

from the album Forever
- Released: August 31, 1999
- Length: 4:48
- Label: Bad Boy Entertainment
- Songwriters: Sean Combs; Jeffrey Walker; Roger Greene; Kelly Price; Robert Kelly; Denzil Foster; Jay King; Thomas McElroy
- Producers: Sean "Puffy" Combs; Jeffery "J-Dub" Walker; Sam Lane

Puff Daddy singles chronology
"P.E. 2000" (1999)	"Satisfy You" (1999)	"Notorious B.I.G." (1999)

R. Kelly singles chronology
"If I Could Turn Back the Hands of Time" (1999)	"Satisfy You" (1999)	"Only the Loot Can Make Me Happy" (2000)

"Satisfy You" is a song by American rapper Puff Daddy featuring singer R. Kelly. The song was co-written by both Puff Daddy and Kelly, with additional writing by Kelly Price, who performs backing vocals. The song's beat and bassline is taken from "I Got 5 on It" by Luniz, which itself interpolates Club Nouveau's "Why You Treat Me So Bad", among others.

Released on August 31, 1999, "Satisfy You" spent six weeks at number one on the US Hot R&B Singles & Tracks chart and peaked at number two on the Billboard Hot 100. It was also successful in Europe, peaking at number two in Germany and entering the top 10 in Belgium, Iceland, the Netherlands, Switzerland, and the United Kingdom. It received a nomination for Best Rap Performance by a Duo or Group at the 42nd Grammy Awards in 2000, losing to "You Got Me" by the Roots.

== Music video ==
The music video's main story shows the rapper walking in on his girlfriend cheating on him with another man. The music video then shows R. Kelly and Puff Daddy singing the chorus in a valley and mountain desert area. The video was directed by Hype Williams.

== Remixes ==
The song has two official remixes. The first remix features a new beat, two new verses by Puff Daddy, a verse by Lil' Kim, and vocals by Mario Winans. The second remix is the West Coast Remix features the original beat, verses by the Luniz, vocals by R. Kelly, and a new verse, intro, and outro by Puff Daddy.

== Charts ==
=== Weekly charts ===
Chart (1999–2000)	Peak position
Australia (ARIA)	31
Austria (Ö3 Austria Top 40)	17
Belgium (Ultratop 50 Flanders)	3
Belgium (Ultratop 50 Wallonia)	5
Canada Dance/Urban (RPM)	6
Europe (Eurochart Hot 100)	9
France (SNEP)	19
Germany (GfK)	2
Iceland (Íslenski Listinn Topp 40)	8
Ireland (IRMA)	28
Netherlands (Dutch Top 40)	4
Netherlands (Single Top 100)	4
Scottish Singles Sales (Official Charts)	27
Sweden (Sverigetopplistan)	38
Switzerland (Schweizer Hitparade)	6
UK Singles (Official Charts)	8
UK Dance (Official Charts)	7
UK Hip Hop/R&B (Official Charts)	1
US Billboard Hot 100	2
US Hot R&B/Hip-Hop Songs (Billboard)	1
US Hot Rap Songs (Billboard)	1
US Rhythmic Airplay (Billboard)	2

=== Year-end charts ===
Chart (1999)	Position
Belgium (Ultratop 50 Flanders)	96
Belgium (Ultratop 50 Wallonia)	81
Europe (Eurochart Hot 100)	68
Germany (Media Control)	38
Netherlands (Dutch Top 40)	80
Netherlands (Single Top 100)	56
US Billboard Hot 100	95
US Hot R&B/Hip-Hop Singles & Tracks (Billboard)	59
US Hot Rap Singles (Billboard)	11
US Rhythmic Top 40 (Billboard)	48

Chart (2000)	Position
Belgium (Ultratop 50 Flanders)	58
Europe (Eurochart Hot 100)	100
Switzerland (Schweizer Hitparade)	75
UK Singles (OCC)	115
US Rhythmic Top 40 (Billboard)	30

== Certifications ==
Region	Certification	Certified units/sales
Belgium (BRMA)	Gold	25,000^{*}
Germany (BVMI)	Gold	250,000^{^}
United Kingdom (BPI)	Silver	200,000^{‡}
United States (RIAA)	Gold	500,000^{^}
^{*} Sales figures based on certification alone.^{^} Shipments figures based on certification alone.^{‡} Sales+streaming figures based on certification alone.

== Release history ==
Region	Date	Format(s)	Label(s)	Ref.
United States	August 31, 1999	Urban radio	Bad Boy Entertainment	
United Kingdom	February 28, 2000	12-inch vinyl; CD; cassette	Bad Boy Entertainment; Arista; BMG	

== See also ==
- List of Hot R&B Singles & Tracks number ones of 1999
