= Sporty Thievz =

American hip hop group

- Sporty Thievz in 1998

Background information
- Origin: Yonkers, New York, U.S.
- Genre: Hip hop
- Years active: 1997–present
- Label: Ruffhouse
- Members: King Kirk; Big Dubez
- Past members: Marlon Brando

Sporty Thievz is a Yonkers, New York–based hip-hop duo—originally a trio—composed of King Kirk (a.k.a. Thieven Stealburg), Big Dubez (a.k.a. Safecracker) and Marlon Bryant Brando (March 19, 1979 – May 11, 2001; a.k.a. Robin Hood). They are notable for their parody of TLC's hit "No Scrubs" titled "No Pigeons", which attempted to tell things from the male perspective, and their song "Hit It Up" on the soundtrack to The Best Man. They are also known for satirically providing a male counterpoint to the female-oriented R&B music popularised in the late 1990s and early 2000s, something that was not done by any other group at the time. The group have been acknowledged for their lyrical skill, also making other notable hits such as "Cheapskate", which also has a music video and was released under Ruffhouse Records.

In 1998, their album Street Cinema was released on Roc-A-Bloc/Ruffhouse Records. The majority of the production was handled by Ski, famous for his work on Jay-Z's Reasonable Doubt. It had a unique concept in which every track had its own storyline that could also serve as a premise for a movie. This concept would reprise a decade later on rapper Ludacris's 2008 album, Theater of the Mind.

They did not get much airplay until the "No Pigeons" single was released, which hit #16 in the UK Singles Chart and stayed on that chart for six weeks. Street Cinema was re-released with "No Pigeons" appearing as a bonus track.

In an attempt to capitalize, Sporty Thievz also released a rebuttal to Destiny's Child's hits "Bills, Bills, Bills" (written by the same songwriter as "No Scrubs", Kandi Burruss) and "Independent Women". The "Bills Bills Bills" rebuttal, entitled "Can't Pay Your Bills", demands "I need a lady working 9-5 to help her man out" (not to be confused with the track entitled "No Billz (Why, Why, Why?)" in which the group "humorously" questions "Why we gotta spend, because we men?"). In the "Independent Women" rebuttal "Independent Men" they consider the unfairness of child support, stating "She won't let me see my seed acting like it's funny, She gettin' her hair done with that diaper money".

The group contributed to the Rawkus Records 2000 compilation Hip Hop for Respect, a project put together by Mos Def and Talib Kweli to put out an EP recording 41 emcees in protest over the 41 shots fired at African immigrant and innocent man, Amadou Diallo, by the NYPD.

On May 11, 2001, group member Marlon Bryant Brando was killed after being struck by a car in North Bronx at the age of 22. It is reported that the driver of the car was intoxicated and swerving onto the sidewalk.

== Discography ==
- 1999: Street Cinema
- 2000: Sporty Thievz
- 2013: "Speak Ya Mind - Cinema, Beats & Brawdz Pt.1 Mixtape"
- 2013: "The Best of Sporty Thievz Classic Freestyles Mixtape"
- 2014: "Sporty Thievz Album Street Cinema 2"
- 2021: "King Kirk Album Dopeman"
- 2022: "King Kirk Album Trading Places"
- 2022: "Sporty Thievz Album Foot Locker"
- 2023: "Boyz Squad Album California Compton"
- 2023: "King Kirk Album N.W.A.
