= JT Money =

American rapper

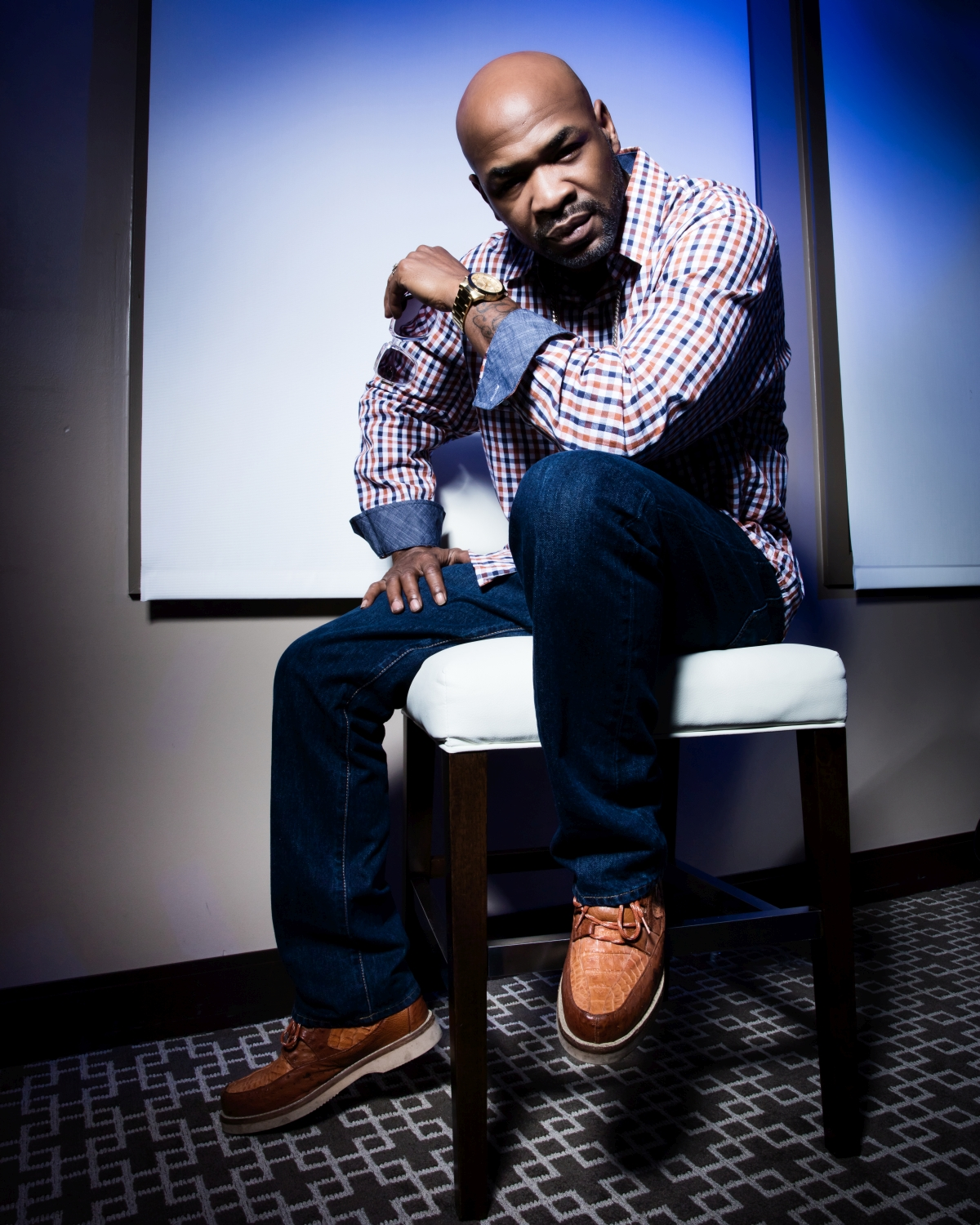
- Thompkins in 2016

Background information
- Born: Jeffrey Jermaine Thompkins; September 14, 1972 (age 53); Miami, Florida, U.S.
- Genres: Southern hip-hop
- Occupations: Rapper; songwriter
- Years active: 1989–present
- Labels: Luke; Freeworld; Priority; Crunk City; Undeniable
- Member of: Poison Clan
- Children: 1

Jeffrey Jermaine Thompkins (born September 14, 1972), better known by his stage name JT Money, is an American rapper from Miami, Florida. He is the lead member of hip hop group Poison Clan, and was a protégé of fellow Miami native Luther "Luke" Campbell — having signed with Luke Records in 1990. His debut studio album, Pimpin' on Wax (1999), spawned the single "Who Dat" (featuring Solé), which peaked at number five on the Billboard Hot 100.

== Career ==
Thompkins was discovered by Luke Skyywalker of the 2 Live Crew in a Miami talent show. Skyywalker signed JT Money and Debonaire as the group Poison Clan to his Luke Records. In 1990 JT Money and Debonaire released their first album as a group, 2 Low Life Muthas. After this Debonaire left Poison Clan to join another group, Home Team, with his brother, Drugzie also from the Poison Clan. This left JT Money as the main lyrical driving force of the group, which also featured members Madball, Uzi, Big Ram, and associates Shorty-T and Trigga.

The second Poison Clan album, 1992's Poisonous Mentality, featured the hit "Shake What Ya Mama Gave Ya", which was listed by XXL magazine as one of the top 250 hip-hop songs of the 1990s. JT Money released two more albums under the Poison Clan name: Ruff Town Behavior in 1993 and Straight Zooism in 1995. Some other well known Poison Clan songs include "Action", "Bad Influence", "Dance All Night", "Fire Up This Funk", "The Girl That I Hate", and "Don't Sleep On A Hizzo".

In 1999 JT Money dropped the Poison Clan name for the album Pimpin' On Wax, now just recording under his own stage name. This album achieved mainstream commercial success with the major hit single "Who Dat", featuring Solé. The song reached number 5 on the Billboard Hot 100 and won Top Rap Single at the 1999 Billboard Music Awards. After this JT Money continued his solo career, releasing three more albums to date, none of which matched the commercial success of his solo debut.

== Albums ==
Solo albums

Year	Album	Chart Positions	
Year	Album	US	US Hip-Hop
1999	Pimpin' on Wax	28	8
2001	Blood Sweat and Years	48	9
2002	Return of the B-Izer	-	-
2005	Undeniable	-	-
2015	Pimpin Gangsta Party	-	-

With the Poison Clan:

- 1990: 2 Low Life Muthas
- 1992: Poisonous Mentality
- 1993: Ruff Town Behavior
- 1995: Strait Zooism

== Singles ==
Year	Song	U.S. Hot 100	U.S. R&B	U.S. Rap	Album
1999	"Who Dat"	5	2	1	Pimpin' on Wax
2001	"Hi-Lo"	-	64	-	Blood Sweat and Years/The New Guy/All About the Benjamins
2016	"We Hustle We Grind"	-	-	-	n/a

=== Featured singles ===
Year	Single	U.S. Hot 100	U.S. R&B	U.S. Rap	Album
1999	"4, 5, 6" (Solé with JT Money and Kandi)	21	9	1	Skin Deep
2017	"Booty Cheeks" (JT Money featuring Detroit's Filthiest)	n/a	n/a	n/a	n/a
2017	"Tonite Its Goin Down" (Fresh Kid Ice featuring JT Money, Brian Billionaire, Dee Goodson)	n/a	n/a	n/a	Breaking Glass Ceilings Vol. 1
2021	"Duval Dade" (Natalac featuring JT Money)	n/a	n/a	n/a	Love & Pimp-Hop

=== Music videos ===
Year	Video	Director
1999	"Who Dat"	DC Coles
1999	"Alright" (featuring Big Gipp)	Aaron Courseault
1999	"4, 5, 6" (with Solé and Kandi)	Gregory Dark
2001	"Hi-Lo"	Aaron Courseault
2001	"Super Chick"	Benny Boom
2014	"Hustlin'"	Antwan Smith
2014	"Chevy Game"	Eastside Hernandez
