= Solé =

American singer-songwriter (born 1973)

- Also known as: Mrssole, Aja Shah
- Born: Tonya Michelle Johnston; July 17, 1973 (age 53); Kansas City, Missouri, U.S.
- Genre: Hip hop
- Occupations: Rapper; songwriter; actress; wellness practitioner
- Years active: 1993–present
- Labels: DreamWorks; Interscope; Universal
- Spouse: Ginuwine (m. 2003; div. 2015) Professor Griff (m. 2017; sep. 2026)
- Website: iamsole.com

Tonya Michelle Johnston (born July 17, 1973), known professionally as Solé, is an American rapper from Kansas City, Missouri.

== Early life and education ==
Solé was born on July 17, 1973, in Kansas City, to Phyllis Frazier and James Johnston. Her siblings are Sean and Charles "Chuck" Johnston, Sierra and Tamika Gamble. She is of East African, Tamil (South Indian), Native American descent through her mother's side and North African, Eastern European and British descent through her father's side. She attended cosmetology school and college in the early 1990s, where she studied political science and psychology before securing a record deal with DreamWorks Records and RedZone Entertainment.

== Career ==
Solé descended from a family of musical talent, songwriters, singers and musicians. She began rapping at the age of 6 and formed a group called Divine with her best friend Shurhea Mitchell in 1986. They would perform at local talent shows and in 1990 they won a trip to the BRE (Black Radio Exclusive) in New Orleans, to perform at a showcase in front of record label execs and other artists. They were offered a record deal by JDK Records and flew to New York to record. Her father, who was managing them at the time, didn't feel it was a good deal so they went back home and started college.

She once again began recording in 1997 with Tech N9ne and Don Juan of Kansas City fame and traveled to LA to record. She met Thabiso Nkhereanye who introduced her to Christopher Tricky Stewart of Red Zone Entertainment, who signed her to a production deal. Her career took off as a hardcore female hip hop artist by attracting attention in the summer of 1999 with her appearance on J.T. Money's hit single "Who Dat," which reached number 1 on the US Rap chart, remaining there for 8 weeks (a record at the time), winning number 2 on the US R&B chart, and number 5 on the US Hot 100. "Who Dat" won "Rap Single of the Year" at the 1999 Billboard Music Awards as well.

In September 1999, she released her debut album Skin Deep, which was an overall success in the United States. She also went on to win several ASCAP Music awards that same year.

In 2011 she was featured on “Naal Naachna" by UK based bhangra artist Jassi Sidhu lead singer of British-Indian bhangra band B21.

In February 2012 she featured on a song called "A New Look" by Focus.

In 2017 she was featured on "SOC MED Digital Heroin" from Public Enemy 30th-anniversary album Nothing Is Quick in the Desert.

On September 29, 2019, Solé released her second album Encoded.

Following a hiatus from the music industry, Solé transitioned into a career as a holistic wellness practitioner, spiritual guide, and certified Jivamukti Yoga teacher. She later founded Devi Tribe Wellness, incorporating modalities such as sound healing, herbalism, and Ayurveda into her practice.

== Personal life ==
Solé met Ginuwine in June 1999 and began dating in October 1999. The two became engaged in August 2000. They resided in Brandywine, Maryland. They have two daughters together: Story (b. March 29, 2001) and Dream Sarae Lumpkin (b. November 1, 2002). Solé married Ginuwine on September 8, 2003, in Grand Cayman.

Solé has four daughters in total and one granddaughter. Her daughters De'jan Nicole Lee, born in 1992, and Cypress Soleil Lee, born in 1995, are from a previous relationship. Her granddaughter, Sage Lotus Lee, was born May 17, 2020.

In 2014, Solé filed for divorce; Ginuwine announced their separation in November of that year. Their divorce was finalized July 22, 2015.

On August 27, 2017, Solé married Public Enemy band member and rapper Professor Griff, taking his last name Shah and legally changing her full name to Aja Shah. In October 2026, she announced that they had separated after nine years together.

== Discography ==
=== Studio albums ===
Year	Album	Chart Positions	
Year	Album	US	US Hip-Hop
1999	Skin Deep	127	27
2019	Encoded	—	—

=== Singles ===
==== Solo ====
Year	Title	Peak chart positions				Album
Year	Title	Billboard Hot 100	Hot R&B/Hip-Hop Songs	Hot Rap Singles	Rhythmic Top 40	Album
1999	"4, 5, 6" (featuring JT Money and Kandi)	21	9	1	24	Skin Deep
2000	"It Wasn't Me" (featuring Ginuwine)	—	44	—	19	Skin Deep
2019	"Encoded"	—	—	—	—	Encoded
2019	"Pranayama"	—	—	—	—	Encoded
2019	"Under the Veil"	—	—	—	—	Encoded
2019	"The Formula"	—	—	—	—	Encoded
2019	"Daughter of The Earth"	—	—	—	—	Encoded

==== As featured performer ====
Year	Title	Peak chart positions			Album
Year	Title	Billboard Hot 100	Hot R&B/Hip-Hop Songs	Hot Rap Singles	Album
1999	"Baby" (Before Dark feat. Sole)	—	48	—	Daydreamin'
1999	"Who Dat" (JT Money feat. Sole)	5	2	1	Pimpin' on Wax
"—" indicates singles that did not chart.

=== Guest appearances ===
Year	Song	Artist(s)	Album
1999	"Straight Thuggin'" (also featuring Twista)	Kane & Abel	Rise to Power
1999	"Clueless" (also featuring Larone Burnette)	Tech N9ne	The Calm Before the Storm
1999	"Let Him Go"	Tamar Braxton	Tamar: Just Cuz
1999	"Better Than Me" (Mario Winans Remix)	Terry Dexter	Better Than Me (single)
2001	"Get Up On It"	Tyrese	2000 Watts
2001	"Contagious (Mercenary Mix)"	The Isley Brothers	Contagious (Remix)
2002	"Costa Nostra"	Don Juan	Mizery Won't Stop
2003	"Sex"	Ginuwine	The Senior
2011	"Naal Nuchuna"	Jassi Sidhu	Singing Between the Lines
2012	"A New Look"	Focus...	
2017	"SOC MED Digital Herion"	Public Enemy	Nothing Is Quick in the Desert
