= Kandi Burruss discography =

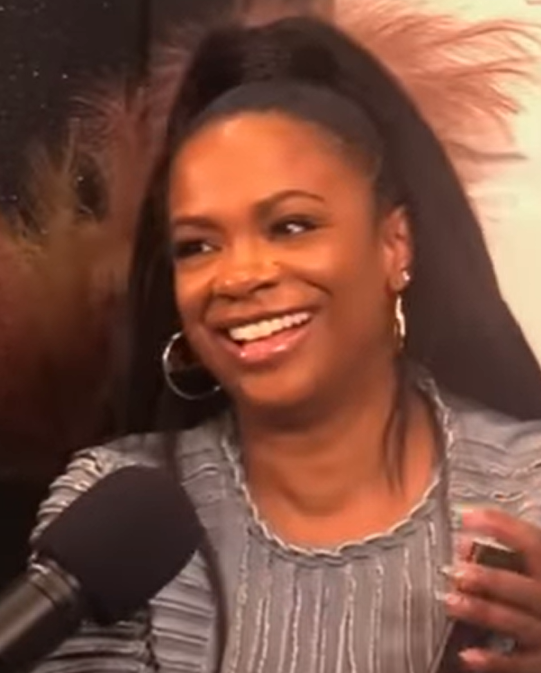
- Studio albums: 2
- Extended plays: 1
- Singles: 9
- Music videos: 5

The discography of Kandi Burruss comprises two studio albums, nine singles, and five music videos, in addition to her work as a songwriter and producer.

Burruss was a member of the 1990s girl group Xscape before debuting as a solo artist with her album Hey Kandi in 2000. The album peaked at #72 on the Billboard 200 and sold over 260,000 copies in the United States. She then released her debut EP, Fly Above EP on October 29, 2009, followed by her sophomore album, Kandi Koated, in 2010.

== Studio albums ==
Title	Details	Peak chart positions			
Title	Details	US	US R&B	AUS	UK
Hey Kandi...	Release date: September 19, 2000; Label: Columbia; Formats: CD, cassette	72	32	100	129
Kandi Koated	Release date: December 14, 2010; Label: Asylum; Formats: CD, music download	91	17	—	—
"—" denotes releases that did not chart

== Extended plays ==
Title	Details
Fly Above EP	Release date: October 29, 2009; Label: Kandi Koated Entertainment; Formats: CD, music download

== Singles ==
=== As lead artist ===
Single	Year	Peak chart positions							Certifications (sales thresholds)	Album
Single	Year	US	US R&B	US Pop	AUS	NL	NZ	UK	Certifications (sales thresholds)	Album
"Don't Think I'm Not"	2000	24	32	12	16	22	7	9	BPI: Silver	Hey Kandi...
"Cheatin' on Me"	2001	—	92	—	—	—	—	—		Hey Kandi...
"Fly Above"	2009	—	—	—	—	—	—	—		Fly Above
"Leave U"	2010	—	84	—	—	—	—	—		Kandi Koated
"Me & U"	2011	—	66	—	—	—	—	—		Kandi Koated
"Stay Prayed Up"	2013	—	—	—	—	—	—	—		Non-album singles
"Let Them Love"	2013	—	—	—	—	—	—	—		Non-album singles
"Fake People"	2018	—	—	—	—	—	—	—		Non-album singles
"Only for You"	2023	—	—	—	—	—	—	—		Non-album singles
"—" denotes releases that did not chart

=== As featured performer ===
Year	Single	Peak chart positions			Album
Year	Single	US	US R&B	US Rap	Album
1999	"4, 5, 6" (Solé featuring Kandi and JT Money)	27	9	1	Skin Deep
2002	"Crew Deep" (Skillz featuring Missy "Misdemeanor" Elliott and Kandi)	—	83	—	I Ain't Mad No More
2006	"U and Dat" (E-40 featuring Kandi Girl and T-Pain)	13	8	4	My Ghetto Report Card
2009	"Try It Out" (Big Bank Black featuring Kandi)	—	52	—	Try It Out EP
2013	"Legs to the Moon" (Rasheeda featuring Kandi)	—	—	—	Boss Chick Music
2015	"Unnecessary Trouble" (Demetria McKinney featuring Kandi)	—	—	—	Non-album single
"—" denotes releases that did not chart

== Other appearances ==
Year	Song	Album
1994	"Fa' All Y'all" (Da Brat featuring Kandi)	Funkdafied
1996	"Everyday" (MC Lyte featuring Kandi)	Bad As I Wanna B
2000	"Don't Think I'm Not"	MTV Fantastic Females, Vol. 3
2000	"What I'm Gon' Do to You"	Big Momma's House soundtrack
2001	"You Bring the Freak Out of Me" (Jermaine Dupri featuring Kandi and Da Brat)	Instructions
2003	"Cutty Girl" (Gangsta Boo featuring Kandi)	Enquiring Minds II: The Soap Opera
2007	"Neva Wanna Leave" (Rasheeda featuring Kandi)	Dat Type of Gurl
2007	"My Bubble Gum (Remix)" (Rasheeda featuring Fabo of D4L, Kandi, Diamond and Princess of Crime Mob)	Dat Type of Gurl
2009	"Bam" (Rasheeda featuring Kandi)	Certified Hot Chick
2009	"Thang for You" (Rasheeda featuring Kandi)	Certified Hot Chick
2009	"Nonbelievers" (Rasheeda featuring Kandi)	Certified Hot Chick
2010	"Independent Bitches (Remix)" (Candi Redd featuring Rasheeda & Kandi Girl)	Code Redd

== Songwriting credits ==
Notes: Songs that have missing information indicate songs that are registered on the ASCAP database, but have either not been released, recorded or completed. Also, this list does not include any of Burruss' music as a lead solo artists, only songs she has (co-)written for other artists.

Year	Song	Lead artist
2020	3am in LA	Ebenezer
2020	3am in London	Ebenezer
1999	4, 5, 6	Solé
N/A	Another Level	N/A
2000	Another Man's Got You	Sam Salter
2000	As Far As They Know	Before Dark
N/A	Baby I'm Here	N/A
N/A	Back Up Off Me	N/A
2000	Beautiful Women	Boyz II Men
2009	Bam	Rasheeda (PeachCandy)
2011	BedRock (Remix)	Rasheeda
1999	Best Man	Faith Evans
2003	Better Be Me	Cherish
2017	Better Late Than Never	Riley Burruss
1999	Bills, Bills, Bills	Destiny's Child
2002	Blue Jeans	Yasmeen Sulieman
2007	Blue Jeans	Blaque
2021	Bobo	Mariah Angeliq
2002	Bout My Paper	Birdman
2019	Break Up with Your Girlfriend, I'm Bored	Ariana Grande
1999	Bug a Boo	Destiny's Child
2022	Can You Pay?	Paul Woolford
2004	Can't Even C It	Dina Rae
1995	Can't Hang	Xscape
1999	Checkin' for Me	Jo Jo Robinson
2003	Come Get Some	TLC
2020	Come Home	David Banner
N/A	Come Undone	N/A
2009	Cut You Off	Blaque
2014	Dance With Me	Le Youth
1995	Do Like Lovers Do	Xscape
2019	Don Walk	Stefflon Don
2000	Don't Bring Sand to the Beach	Kinnda
N/A	Drive Me Crazy	N/A
2006	Eat It Up	Trillville
1995	Feels So Good	Xscape
2000	Get Crunk Tonight	Joe
2006	Girl Like Me	Fantasia
2010	Give It To Me	Waka Flocka Flame
2002	Girl Talk	TLC
2006	Good...Good	Belinda
2000	Good Guy	Boyz II Men
2002	Good Love	TLC
2012	Good Morning	Lil Scrappy
2006	Got That Good (My Bubble Gum) (Remix)	Rasheeda
N/A	Gotta Have You	N/A
2004	Handle It	Baha Men
1995	Hard to Say Goodbye	Xscape
N/A	He Told Me So	N/A
N/A	Hell Nawh	N/A
2000	Hell wit Ya	Pink
2002	Hey Hey Hey Hey	TLC
1999	Hey Ladies	Destiny's Child
2000	How Could You	Before Dark
2000	How You Gonna Tell Me	Mýa
N/A	I Can't Forget	N/A
N/A	I Can't Go a Day	N/A
N/A	I Don't Feel the Love	N/A
N/A	I Don't Think So	N/A
2022	I Don't Think U Do	SNBRN
N/A	I Feel You	N/A
2001	I Love My Man (I’m Keeping Him)	Nivea
1996	I Think That I Should Be	Mista
2003	I Wanna Be Your Girl	Cherish
N/A	I Will	N/A
2003	I Won't Leave You	Cherish
2002	I'm Right Here	Samantha Mumba
N/A	I'm Shutting You Down	N/A
N/A	If I Was Grown	N/A
2010	Independent (Remix)	Candi Redd
2000	It Makes Me Ill	'N Sync
1999	It Wasn't Me	Solé
2005	It's Good	YoungBloodZ
2001	It's the Weekend	Lil J
2001	Jane Doe	Alicia Keys
2002	Last Boyfriend	B2K
2012	Legs to the Moon	Rasheeda
2019	Looking for Somebody	Trobi
2003	Like What	Tommi
2000	Make Me Stay	Sam Salter
2003	Make Me Wanna Scream	Blu Cantrell
2009	Man Up	Rasheeda (PeachCandy)
2003	Message in the Music	Debra Killings
2003	Miss P.	Cherish
2009	Nasty Song	Rasheeda (PeachCandy)
2000	Never Let Go / Never Let 'Em Go	3LW
2007	Never Wanna Leave	Rasheeda (PeachCandy)
2012	No Angels	Bastille
2001	No Drama	Eden's Crush
1999	No Pigeons	Sporty Thievz
1999	No Scrubs	TLC
2009	Nonbelievers	Rasheeda (PeachCandy)
2003	Pants Up	Lene
2000	Pop Ya Collar	Usher
2005	Pull Ya Brakes	Zena
2007	Rain At Home	Rasheeda (PeachCandy)
2000	Ready	N-Toon
2004	Round Here	Dina Rae
2021	Scrub	Sleepy Hallow
2010	Sex Room	Rasheeda
2017	Shape of You	Ed Sheeran
1999	She Can't Love You	Destiny's Child
2002	Single for the Rest of My Life	Isyss
2021	Skrubs	Lil Durk
1999	So Good	Destiny's Child
2019	SOS	Avicii
2001	Solo Star	Solange
2008	Suicide Doors	David Banner
2003	Stay With You	Cherish
2009	Tardy for the Party	Kim Zolciak
2002	Tell Me No	Whitney Houston
2003	Ten Steps Back	Jessica Wahls
2009	Thang for You	Rasheeda (PeachCandy)
2012	The Baddest	Rasheeda
N/A	The End Song	N/A
2008	They Ain't Gotta Love You	Karina Pasian
2000	There You Go	Pink
1999	Too Friendly	Marc Nelson
2006	U and Dat	E-40
2015	Unnecessary Trouble	Demetria McKinney
1999	Ways To Get Cut Off	Jo Jo Robinson
1995	What Can I Do	Xscape
2023	What It Is (Block Boy)	Doechii
2021	When You're Out	Billen Ted
2003	Whoop De Woo	TLC
2009	Wish I Never	Rasheeda (PeachCandy)
2003	Wide Open	LSG
1999	X-Girlfriend	Mariah Carey
2009	You Ugly	Rasheeda (PeachCandy)
2002	You're My Boo	Samantha Mumba
