= Fear of Flying (album) =

2000 album by Mýa

Studio album by Mya
- Released: April 25, 2000
- Recorded: September 1999 – March 2000
- Studios: Triangle Sound (Atlanta) (Note: Tracks 2 and 8); Doppler (Atlanta) (Note: Track 3); Pacifique (North Hollywood, California) (Note: Track 4); The Hit Factory (New York City) (Note: Tracks 5–7 and 16); Avatar (New York City) (Note: Track 6); Blue Jay (Los Angeles) (Note: Tracks 10, 11 and 15); Chung King (New York City) (Note: Track 12); Sound on Sound (New York City); Westlake Audio (Los Angeles) (Note: Track 14); Daytime/Sheffield A/V (Phoenix, Maryland) (Note: Track 16); Studio 56 (Hollywood, California) (Note: Track 17); American (Woodland Hills, California); Flyte Tyme (Edina, Minnesota) (Note: Engineering on "Free"); Murlyn (Stockholm) (Note: "Again & Again"); The Enterprise (Burbank, California)
- Genre: Hip-hop soul
- Length: 63:44
- Labels: University; Interscope
- Producers: BAG & Arnthor; Anthony Dent; Jerry "Wonder" Duplessis; Damon Elliott; Jerome "Knobody" Foster; Wyclef Jean; Rodney Jerkins; Jimmy Jam and Terry Lewis; The Mercenaries; Mya; Darryl "Day" Pearson; ProJay; Scott Schwertfeger; She'kspere; Soulshock and Karlin; Christopher "Tricky" Stewart; Swizz Beatz; Robin Thicke; Carl "Chucky" Thompson

Mya chronology
Mya (1998)	Fear of Flying (2000)	Moodring (2003)

Singles from Fear of Flying
- 1. "The Best of Me" Released: March 22, 2000; 2. "Case of the Ex" Released: July 11, 2000; 3. "Free" Released: November 21, 2000

Fear of Flying is the second studio album by American singer-songwriter Mya, released on April 25, 2000, by University Music Entertainment and Interscope Records. Following the success of her debut album Mya (1998), Interscope promptly allocated the singer studio time and assembled recording sessions beginning as early as September 1999 which concluded in March 2000. For this record, Mya made the conscious decision to become involved more creatively, opting to pen her own lyrics after securing a publishing deal to launch her own publishing company as well as collaborate with a wider range of established producers and songwriters on the album. Looking to embrace a more mature sound, Harrison consulted and collaborated with a bevy of producers which included Rodney Jerkins, Swizz Beatz, Wyclef Jean, Knobody, Robin Thicke, Tricky Stewart, and Jimmy Jam & Terry Lewis.

A hip hop soul album, Mya described Fear of Flying as a metaphor for the ups and downs of life, a theme present throughout the album which includes handling things like an adult and knowing you must have faith to make anything happen. Lyrically, the album's material addressed the singer's romantic relationships which symbolized her relationship with family, friends and acquaintances. Noting that Fear of Flying is "a reflection of being in love for the very first time, experiencing success and the fears of fame."

Upon its release, the album received mixed reviews from music critics citing some of the album's "tepid material." Commercially well received, Fear of Flying debuted with a Top 20 placement at number 15 on the Billboard 200. Initially though, the album stalled on the charts until the release of the album's second single and in turn solidified Fear of Flying a hit garnering multiplatinum success. To keep the album's momentum, nearly seven months after its original release, Fear of Flying was re–released with two new additional songs on November 7, 2000.

In support of the album, three singles were released – "The Best of Me", "Case of the Ex", and "Free", which attained international chart success. Due to the album's success, Fear of Flying earned Soul Train Awards and MOBO nominations.

Considered her most expressive effort to date, Fear of Flying helped established Mya as a household name in mainstream media and redefine a golden age for R&B. In April 2020, to commemorate the album's twentieth anniversary, Universal Music Group released an expanded edition featuring over 10 rare remixes and bonus tracks.

== Background ==
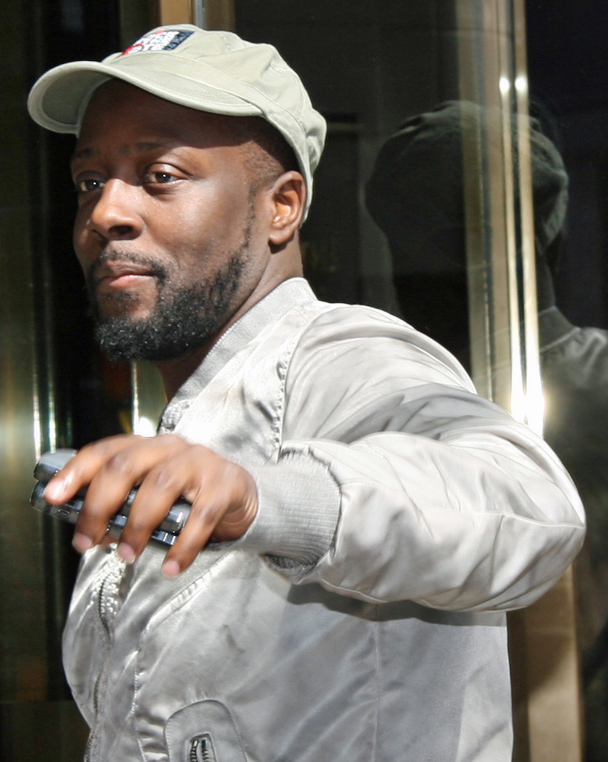
Fugees member Wyclef Jean was consulted to contribute to Fear of Flying.

Following the commercial success of her debut Mya (1998), Mya quickly re-entered the recording studio to begin work on her second album. During her two years away, she toured with several artists, and made her film debut in the thriller In Too Deep (1999). Additionally, she was selected by Bongo jeans as their spokesperson and had a Tommy Hilfiger lipstick shade named after her. During the development stages of the album, Mya consulted several different producers for her follow-up album, including She'kspere, Knobody, Tricky Stewart, and Robin Thicke as well as Wyclef Jean and Swizz Beatz of Ruff Ryders. A number of guest vocalists whom contributed to the project, included TLC's Lisa "Left Eye" Lopes, Jordan Knight, and Beenie Man. In addition, Harrison launched her own publishing company, Art of War.

Mya, who did some writing on her debut album, was heavily involved in the production of Fear of Flying, commenting: "I wanted to get that hands-on experience. I was involved in every single process, from writing and recording to producing, mixing, and mastering." In response to the album's material, the singer commented that many of the album's songs are about female empowerment. "I'm learning that the decisions being made ultimately affect me, so I make most of them with the insight and help of other people", she explained. "I still have to focus on what feels good to me and what's going to work in the long run, instead of selling 20 million records or being controversial." The album's title, came from a song Mya recorded by the same name—not from Erica Jong's 1973 novel of the same name. During an interview with Billboard, which discussed the title, Mya noted that while she had not been aware of the book, she later "started reading it and noticed a lot of similarities: "Fear of Flying is a metaphor for the ups and downs of life. It's about handling things like an adult, knowing you must have faith to make anything happen." Interscope hired photographer and director David LaChapelle to shoot the images for the album's packaging. While she admired the work of Dave La Chapelle, Mya revealed she cropped the original album's cover because it focused on her body, commenting, "I didn't like it. It wasn't capturing."

== Development ==
Mya considers her first album an experiment and a learning ground. Prior to entering a recording studio, she had no vocal training and was doing improv-breathing the whole time on every song. With Fear of Flying, she acknowledged she learned things such as how she likes to work and what works right for her in the studio. On Fear of Flying, she received vocal training and noted her vocals got along better with live performances. Speaking with Time, Mya revealed with Fear of Flying she took more control over her sound and image. She commented that Fear of Flying was "an opportunity and a test." For her second studio album, Mya wrote a lot, openly admitting, "Writing helps me sort through feelings that I'm trying to figure out." She noted her journal is filled with curse words and exclamation points, explaining, "It's either extreme highs or extreme lows." In an interview with the New York Daily News, Mya explained that the album was "about independence." She acknowledged with Fear of Flying she became "more confident", while commenting, "I'm a lot more straightforward. Things I didn't know how to say or when to say, I'm saying now." During the recording process, Mya explained she clicked more with producers that like to start from scratch, commenting, "It allowed me to be involved in the process. They were interested in what I had to say which made me feel good about myself." One producer Mya gelled with was Wyclef Jean. Speaking on working with him, she commented, "He was interested in what I had to say. My ideas—what I had to bring to the table. He wasn't afraid to go back into the studio and change things." Robin Thicke, a then-up-and-coming producer, was another Mya meshed well with. Of his contribution to Fear of Flying Mya commented, "he is a true talent and I enjoyed working with him." While reviewing Fear of Flying, in an article, Time noted on her debut effort, Mya was a "lovestruck teen" while on Fear of Flying, "she's a woman coming face to face with romantic entanglements." With 18 tracks featured on the album, Time applauded the album to manage that rare thing: to combine captivating beats with hummable melodies. Commenting on the finished product, Time wrote, "This is hip-hop soul with plenty of pop appeal."

== Music and composition ==
Musically, Fear of Flying has been described as a "smooth, catchy, personalized mixture of street-spice soul." According to multiple critics, the album is more focused on themes than coherency of musical style. Sonically, the album's sound veers from quiet storm tracks to hard-edged Timbaland homages to cheerleader romps. The album's focal theme is "proper behavior on the dangerous grounds of courtship" and ranges from uptempo tracks to inspirational ballads. Several of the album's 18 tracks were co-written by Mya, with Vibe magazine noting in an article that "Mýa tackles difficult melodic and rhythmic twists without ditching a nice conversational tone." Fear of Flying opens with an intro courtesy of Swizz Beatz. Titled, "Turn It Up" it features a stop-start beat and samples of a cooing baby. Next up, "Case of the Ex," a song structured around producer Tricky Stewart's "driving, Beethoven-meets-Timbaland" chord changes, where Mýa expresses distrust in her lover. It is built around a catchy yet fairly complicated chorus and clever lyrics. It is followed by the "dramatic" "Ride & Shake", which was compared to the work of Whitney Houston. The mildy racy Rodney Jerkins-produced "That's Why I Wanna Fight" is a sensuous midtempo and served as the album's fourth track. Structured, similarly to Marvin Gaye's 70s material, Harrison adopts Gaye's double singing technique. Track five, the dance-oriented imaginative "Pussycats" is a nursery rhyme-influenced song produced by Wyclef Jean and Jerry Duplessis. A frisky jam, it samples the sound of mewing cats.

The album's "combative" sixth track, "The Best of Me", was produced by Swizz Beatz, and features Jadakiss. Described as "edgy" and "street savvy," Mya commented on the message behind the song, suggesting, "It's about setting standards for yourself, about following them through and not allowing the temptations of a heat of the moment situation to lure you into something that you may regret later in life." Described as "mildy structure," the album's seventh track "Lie Detector," is another midtempo which finds Mya refusing advances. The TLC-sounding "How You Gonna Tell Me" courtesy of She'kspere and Kandi has Mya telling her girlfriend to spare her bad advice. Lyrically and conceptually, Mya opted to add her thoughts to the song, explaining, "I wanted the song to be about people preaching to me what they don't practice. About how these specific people speak to me on the way I should live and my reaction to them and their twisted lives." While the "dance-floor-ready" "Takin' Me Over," produced by Robin Thicke featuring Lisa "Left Eye" Lopes, begins with Mya acting like the women she has expressed dislike for, while holed up in her bathroom with hair products. A catchy slice of retro soul, "Takin' Me Over" is '60s Motown meets early '00s and shows Mya in a playful coy mood. Mya dubs it her "don't give a damn song."

The lush title track, "Fear of Flying" is a folk-ish quasi ballad produced by Knobody and uses the idea of being afraid to fly as a metaphor for other issues. The Soulshock and Karlin production, "Can't Believe", and remake of Michael Jackson's "The Lady In My Life", titled "Man In My Life", are standard fare A/C broken-hearted emotional ballads, while on a romantic note, the ballad "No Tears On My Pillow" written by Mya and the song's producer Robin Thicke served as the album's fifteenth track. Followed by "For the First Time": a "sexual surrender cut" produced by Swing Mob member Darryl Pearson, a key collaborator on Harrison's debut album. The album's closing track, an outro, "Get Over" is a spoken word "thank you" midtempo with calypso tinge.

== Marketing ==
=== Release ===
Initially set for a late 1999 release, Fear of Flying was later scheduled for a February 2000 release, before Interscope settled on an April 25, 2000, release date. In Germany, it was released June 19, 2000, while in the United Kingdom, the album was released on July 24, 2000. Interscope hoped that the album would attract both pop and R&B/hip-hop audiences, with Steve Stoute, president of black music and executive VP for Interscope-Geffen-A&M, commenting that all marketing surrounding the album's release would "be paying attention to the street audiences with this album." He added, "We're also looking to build upon her previous success. She gained a large pop audience through 'Ghetto Supastar' and 'Take Me There.' She's also grown as an artist and her music reflects that." On November 7, 2000, Fear of Flying was re-released with a revised track listing which featured the single "Free" and a new track titled "Again & Again". The repackaged edition of the album was released on February 19, 2001, in the United Kingdom and on May 8, 2001, in Germany. The UK reissue contains the track "Whatever Chick", a song that would later be featured on her third studio album, Moodring (2003), appearing there in a reworked and explicit version, retitled "Whatever Bitch".

=== 20th anniversary ===
On April 24, 2020, the singer reissued her second album Fear of Flying, an expanded edition on digital and streaming services featuring over 10 rare remixes and bonus tracks on digital streaming platforms for its 20th anniversary. To commemorate special occasion, the singer took over Universal Music Group's Urban Legend Instagram account to talk all things Fear of Flying.

=== 25th anniversary ===
In 2025, the singer released a twenty-fifth anniversary edition of the album on October 31, 2025 exclusively through Complex for a two-week period ending on November 14. The edition features 2LP pressed on standard black vinyl, an exclusive vintage t-shirt, and a 12×12 signed lithograph.

=== Live performances ===
Promotion for Fear of Flying began in January 2000 when Mya was featured in the February issue of Vibe. In early April 2000, Billboard reported that Mya was set to attend MTV's annual Spring Break special in Cancún. Additionally, that article mentioned that Mya was due to tape an episode of Total Request Live. On May 6, 2000, Mya performed at the Revlon Run/Walk for Women event. On May 17, 2000, she performed "The Best of Me" with Jadakiss on House of Style. In May, she joined and performed on the MTV European Tour. On May 26, 2000, ABC aired their "25 Hottest Stars Under 25" special, which Mya was a part of. On May 29, 2000, she performed "The Best of Me" at the 2000 World Music Awards. In June 2000, Mya joined the Southern California leg of Nickelodeon's All That! Music and More Festival. In July 2000, Mya appeared on the shows CBS Morning Show, CNN's Show Biz, and Farmclub.com; her appearances and performance aired on July 8–10, 2000, on USA Network. In mid-2000, Mya opened for Montell Jordan on his European tour; during a Vibe interview it mentioned that she was heading to Germany to begin the tour. In September 2000, she performed "Case of the Ex" on BET's 106 & Park. On October 23, 2000, she performed "Case of the Ex" on Total Request Live. The following month, November 6 and 11, she performed "Case of the Ex" on The Tonight Show with Jay Leno and the former and "Free" on Soul Train. On December 6, 2000, Mya made an appearance on Live with Regis and Kelly. The following day, December 7, 2000, she performed "Case of the Ex" and "Free" on MTV's Fashionably Loud. On December 15, 2000, Mya performed "Case of the Ex" on The Queen Latifah Show.

In February 2001, during All Star weekend Mya performed at the fifth annual NBA Team Up Celebration, which was held at Constitution Hall. On February 20, Mýa made an appearance on The Rosie O'Donnell Show. The following day after she was invited as a presenter at the 43rd Grammy Awards ceremony. Mya co-hosted and performed at the 2001 Soul Train Music Awards, which were held on February 28, 2001, at the Shrine Auditorium in Los Angeles. In March 2001, Mya was a part of Janet Jackson's MTV Icon special, during which she performed in the dance tribute. After serving as an opening act on other featured tours, Mýa branched out on her own and embarked on her first headlining tour. Entitled, the Fear of Flying Tour, the outing was an eleven-day city tour that began on March 21, 2001, and concluded April 1, 2001. On April 17, 2001, Mya performed on The Queen Latifah Show. On June 15, 2001, she made an appearance on Live! with Regis and Kelly; Seven days later Mya went on The Daily Show. On July 4, 2001, it was announced that she was added to the performer lineup at the York State Fair. On July 14, Mya performed in concert at Six Flags St. Louis. On August 9, she performed at the Wisconsin State Fair; the following day Mya performed at the Ohio State Fair. On September 7, 2001, Mya performed at Michael Jackson's 30th anniversary concert, which was televised. To continue promoting the album, Mya appeared on MTV's Music in High Places, a music and travelogue series where recording artists travel to exotic sites for a series of acoustic concerts. She performed acoustic renditions of her songs while in Sicily, Italy, performing a set comprising her songs "Free", "Ghetto Superstar", "I'll Be There", "Movin' On", "Sweet Thing", and "The Best of Me", among others. Her episode aired on December 20, 2001.

== Singles ==
In support of the album, Interscope Records released three singles from Fear of Flying. Initially, before "The Best of Me" was chosen as the album's lead single, the song "Lie Detector" was a potential contender. The instrumental for "The Best of Me" was originally expected to be used and recorded by rapper DMX in a Miami recording session with Swizz. However, the instrumental of the song was left unused until the producer returned to New York City to start work on Mya's album at The Hit Factory. Upon accidentally pushing a button in the studio, Mya's management reportedly "jumped up and said 'That's it, that's it'" when they heard the song's instrumental. The record was among the last tracks recorded for the album. Jadakiss, then a member of the Ruff Ryders Entertainment's group The LOX, was chosen as the featured artist on the song as a result of label connections with Interscope Records. Released on March 6, 2000, "The Best of Me" peaked at number 50 on the Billboard Hot 100 and number 14 on the Hot R&B/Hip-Hop Songs chart. Internationally, the single found modest chart success, peaking at number 26 in Germany, while charting moderately in the Netherlands and Switzerland.

The second single, "Case of the Ex", was released commercially on August 28, 2000. Originally a rap song, producer Tricky Stewart heavily rearranged the track to make it fit Mya's persona. The song peaked at number two on the Billboard Hot 100 and number 10 on the Hot R&B/Hip-Hop Songs chart. Globally, "Case of the Ex" experienced similar success, peaking at number one in Australia for two weeks and earned a platinum certification from the Australian Recording Industry Association. In the United Kingdom the song charted within the top 10 and earned a silver certification from the British Phonographic Industry. Elsewhere in Europe the song peaked within the Top 40 in The Netherlands, Belgium, Ireland, Scotland, France and Germany.

The third and final single released from the album, "Free", originally appeared on the original soundtrack to the crime comedy film Bait (2000) starring Jamie Foxx. The track was written and produced by Jimmy Jam and Terry Lewis. "Free" reached number 42 on the Billboard Hot 100 and number 52 on the Hot R&B/Hip-Hop Songs chart. Internationally, "Free" performed even better, peaking within the top 10 in Australia. The song received a platinum certification from the Australian Recording Industry Association. Elsewhere, the song charted within the top 20 in the United Kingdom and Poland, and within the top 40 in Ireland and Scotland.

== Critical reception ==
Professional ratings
Review scores
Source	Rating
AllMusic	2.5/5 stars
Entertainment Weekly	C
MTV Asia	7/10
Q	3/5 stars
Rolling Stone	2/5 stars
Uncut	4/5 stars
Voir	2.5/5 stars

People named Fear of Flying their "Album of the Week" and called it an "unexpected treat", though commenting that while "Mya offers no bold new sonic innovations, she does breathe life and sass into a genre too long held hostage by formula." In another positive review, The Source wrote: "Reaching out to hip-hop heads [...] Mya proves she can hold her own in this competitive game of young female musicians. She's well on her way [to] the class of elite divas." Uncut called the album a "crafted, coffee-rich affair blending soul and swing [...] it's a grower which oozes class." Billboard found that Fear of Flying "lets the songstress spread her wings and express herself freely. On the set, crafted as a coming-of-age album, Mya handles issues that every young woman faces." Vibe stated that "the starlet has decided to show off her range [...] as if she and her top-notch producers attempted to wipe out the competition by transforming Mya into each of her rivals in turn [...] a grand tour through the ever-changing moods of female adolescence."

Q magazine rated the album 3 stars out of 5 and wrote: "Mya demonstrates enough sass to suggest a sunny future." In his review for AllMusic, Jon Azpiri wrote that "Mya's sophomore effort proves that she is a promising young talent, but still has yet to develop the chops necessary to rank among the best of R&B divas." He felt that "without the energy of collaborators in the mix, many of her solo tracks wander into predictability. The album relies too heavily on tepid ballads such as the title track and "Man of My Life". Yet songs like "Can't Believe", "For the First Time", and "Lie Detector" show an emotional depth that lacked in her debut." Josh Tyrangiel of Entertainment Weekly gave the album a C rating. He found that "Mýa can sing well enough; now she needs to find something to sing about." Rolling Stone magazine writer Ernest Hardy gave the album 2 stars out of 5 and wrote: "The signature quiver in Mya's voice does give her some sonic identity, but otherwise this could be the music of Destiny's Child, Aaliyah or any of the countless interchangeable hip-hop/R&B divas." Richard Lafrance, writing for Voir, noted: "The fifteen-song album ends with three ballads which say a lot about the intentions of Mya's team, which seems to be more towards the fan clubs of Brandy and Michel'le than the disciples of the Ruff Ryders."

== Accolades ==
=== Awards and nominations ===
Awards and nominations
Year	Ceremony	Award	Result	Ref.
2000	Washington Area Music Awards	Urban Contemporary Recording	Won	
2000	Washington Area Music Awards	Album of the Year	Nominated	
2001	MOBO	Best Album	Nominated	
2001	Soul Train Music Awards	Best R&B/Soul Album - Female	Nominated	

=== Listings ===
Listings
Year	Publication	List	Position	Ref.
2007	The Guardian	1000 Albums to Hear Before You Die	–	

== Commercial performance ==
In the United States, Fear of Flying debuted and peaked at number 15 on the Billboard 200 and at number seven on the Top R&B/Hip-Hop Albums chart with first-week sales of 72,000 copies sold. In its second and third week, the album sold an estimated 42,784 and 33,907 copies, respectively. Thirteen weeks after its release, the album sat at number 109 on the Billboard 200. During its chart run, Fear of Flying remained on the Billboard 200 for a total of 52 consecutive weeks. Towards the end of 2000, Billboard ranked the album as the 144th best-selling album in the US, while at the end of 2001 it was ranked as the 178th best-selling album. On June 8, 2000, the album was certified gold by the Recording Industry Association of America (RIAA) denoting shipments in excess of 500,000 copies. While on March 28, 2001, the album was certified platinum by the RIAA. By May 2003, the album had sold 1.2 million copies in the United States alone, according to Nielsen SoundScan.

In Canada the album debuted at number 51 on RPM' s Top Albums/CDs chart, during the week of May 15, 2000. In its second week on the chart it rose 12 spots to its peak position of number 39, during the week ending on May 22, 2000. In total Fear of Flying spent nine consecutive weeks on the Top Albums/CDs chart. On January 15, 2001, the album was certified gold by Music Canada for denoting shipments of 50,000 copies. In Germany, the album debuted at number 52 on July 3, 2000, where it stayed at its peak position for a total of two weeks; in total it has spent 16 consecutive weeks on the German Albums Chart.

In Australia it debuted at number 54 on the Australian Albums Chart and reached number 28 in its 18th non-consecutive week. It spent a total of 25 non-consecutive weeks on the chart and was eventually certified gold by the Australian Recording Industry Association (ARIA) in September 2001. In Switzerland, the album debuted at number 84 on July 16, 2000. It reached its peak at number 33, 6 weeks later on August 20, 2000. Overall, the album has spent a total of 16 consecutive weeks on the Swiss Albums Chart. For the week of February 25, 2001 - March 3, 2001 the album debuted and peaked at number 81 on the UK Albums Chart. In its 12th week on the UK R&B Albums chart it peaked at number 17, during the week of June 10, 2001 - June 16, 2001. By May 18, 2001, worldwide sales for Fear of Flying (2000) stood at six million copies sold combined with sales from Mya's debut album.

== Impact and legacy ==
Mya have been credited with popularizing Y2K R&B. Erika Brooks Adickman of Idolator commented her music "epitomized everything that was great about turn-of-the millennium R&B." Described as sultry and futuristic, Alex Frank of Vogue applauded Harrison capabilities to "elbowed out the crunchy catchiness of Britney Spears and aggression of Kid Rock" with interesting, seductive music. With the dominant sounds of R&B production at the time, he also commended the singer for "creating something preppy and poppy and radio-friendly that kept pace with the Britneys and the N'Syncs without sacrificing experimentation." While, all in all, he characterized Mya's brand of R&B as "neo-R&B—an innovative take on a beloved genre that promised a way forward." He finished with Mya is "proof of a kind of inevitability of influence, with her sound now palpable in the music of a whole new generation of musicians who grew up on her hits."

Following its release, Fear of Flying cemented Mya place at the forefront of the genre's stars. American author Stacy-Deanne noted Fear of Flying took Mya to "new heights" and established her as a household name in mainstream media. Deanne recognized with Fear of Flying it exemplified why fans truly appreciated her music and saluted the sophomore effort as "poetic," "sexy," "passionate," and "honest sensitivity." Consequently, she expressed, Fear of Flying had succeeded in a way that the first album had not...it had "crossover appeal." In the midst of her success, Deanne opined Harrison proved herself a well rounded-performer with flexible abilities who was consistently a "source of attraction" on television and on tour. Essentially, Deanne dubbed Fear of Flying as Harrison's most expressive effort. Similarly, The Guardian lauded Fear of Flying as "a new golden age for R&B," while emphasizing Mya's "lightly melismatic vocals suited these rhythmically tricksy tales, capturing perfectly the highly charged sadness of a dead affair." In honor of their "2000 week," Billboard highlighted and included "How You Gonna Tell Me" on their 40 Best Deep Cuts of 2000 list, suggesting,"Tell Me" would've made a much likelier hit than the tepid "Best of Me." Rolling Out's Nagashia Jackson commended the singer and its body of work as Fear of Flying "established her as a forward-thinking architect of contemporary R&B, blending traditional soul influences with progressive electronic and hip-hop elements."

Several recording artists have covered, sampled, or inspired by the singles from Fear of Flying such as Father, Tory Lanez, Jack Back, Giant Claw, Harloe, Sir Babygirl, Normani, J.I the Prince of N.Y, and Shantel May.

== Track listing ==
Fear of Flying track listing
No.	Title	Writer(s)	Producer(s)	Length
1.	"Turn It Up (Intro)" (featuring Swizz Beatz)			1:22
2.	"Case of the Ex"	Christopher A. Stewart; Traci Hale; Tab	Christopher "Tricky" Stewart	3:56
3.	"Ride & Shake"	Anthony Dent; Tamara Savage	Dent	4:00
4.	"That's Why I Wanna Fight"	Rodney Jerkins; LaShawn Daniels; Fred Jerkins III	Jerkins; L. Daniels^{[a]}	4:35
5.	"Pussycats"	Mya Harrison; Wyclef Jean; Jerry Duplessis; Jimmy Cozier	Jean; Jerry "Wonder" Duplessis	4:21
6.	"The Best of Me" (featuring Jadakiss)	Harrison; Kasseem Dean; Cozier; Teron Beal; Jason Phillips; Mashonda Tifrere	Swizz Beatz; Cozier^{[b]}; Beal^{[b]}	4:12
7.	"Lie Detector" (featuring Beenie Man)	Harrison; Jean; Duplessis; Moses Davis	Jean; Duplessis	4:21
8.	"How You Gonna Tell Me"	Kevin Briggs; Kandi Burruss; Harrison	She'kspere; Burruss^{[c]}	3:35
9.	"Grandma Says (Skit)"		Carl "Chucky" Thompson	0:48
10.	"Takin' Me Over" (featuring Left Eye)	Harrison; James Gass; Robin Thicke; Robert Daniels; Lisa Lopes	Thicke; ProJay	3:55
11.	"Now or Never"	Gass; Thicke; R. Daniels; Bobby Keyes	Thicke; ProJay	3:50
12.	"Fear of Flying"	Jerome Foster; Joe Davi; Beal; Derrick Thompson	Jerome "Knobody" Foster	4:24
13.	"Flying (Interlude)"	Harrison	C. Thompson; Harrison	0:52
14.	"Can't Believe"	Carsten Schack; Kenneth Karlin; Channette Higgens; Channoah Higgens	Soulshock and Karlin	4:16
15.	"No Tears on My Pillow"	Harrison; Thicke	Thicke; ProJay	4:02
16.	"For the First Time"	Harrison; Darryl Pearson	Darryl "Day" Pearson; C. Thompson	4:20
17.	"Man in My Life"	Rod Temperton	The Mercenaries; Tone & Poke^{[d]}; Thicke^{[b]}; Florian "Flo" Ammon^{[e]}	4:32
18.	"Get Over (Outro)"	Harrison	C. Thompson; Harrison; Scott Schwertfeger	2:27

North American re-issue
No.	Title	Writer(s)	Producer(s)	Length
1.	"Turn It Up (Intro)"			1:22
2.	"Case of the Ex"	Stewart; Hale; Tab	Stewart	3:56
3.	"Free"	Harrison; James Harris III; Terry Lewis; Alex Richbourg; Tony Tolbert	Jimmy Jam and Terry Lewis; "Big Jim" Wright^{[c]}	5:21
4.	"Pussycats"	Harrison; Jean; Duplessis; Cozier	Jean; Duplessis	4:21
5.	"Again & Again"	Anders Bagge; Laila Bagge; Alistair Tennant; Wayne Hector; Claudia Ogalde; Harrison	BAG & Arnthor; Harrison^{[d]}; Damon Elliott^{[d]}	3:29
6.	"How You Gonna Tell Me"	Briggs; Burruss; Harrison	She'kspere; Burruss^{[c]}	3:35
7.	"Grandma Says (Skit)"		C. Thompson	0:48
8.	"Takin' Me Over" (featuring Left Eye)	Harrison; Gass; Thicke; R. Daniels; Lopes	Thicke; ProJay	3:55
9.	"The Best of Me" (featuring Jadakiss)	Harrison; Dean; Cozier; Beal; Phillips; Tifrere	Swizz Beatz; Cozier^{[b]}; Beal^{[b]}	4:12
10.	"Lie Detector" (featuring Beenie Man)	Harrison; Jean; Duplessis; Davis	Jean; Duplessis	4:25
11.	"Fear of Flying"	Foster; Davi; Beal; D. Thompson	Foster	4:24
12.	"Fear of Flying (Interlude)"	Harrison	C. Thompson; Harrison	0:52
13.	"Now or Never"	Gass; Thicke; R. Daniels; Keyes	Thicke; ProJay	3:50
14.	"Man in My Life"	Temperton	The Mercenaries; Tone & Poke^{[c]}; Thicke^{[b]}; Ammon^{[e]}	4:32
15.	"Can't Believe"	Schack; Karlin; Channette Higgens; Channoah Higgens	Soulshock and Karlin	4:16
16.	"That's Why I Wanna Fight"	Jerkins; L. Daniels; Jerkins III	Jerkins; L. Daniels^{[a]}	4:35
17.	"Ride & Shake"	Dent; Savage	Dent	4:00
18.	"Get Over (Outro)"	Harrison	C. Thompson; Harrison; Schwertfeger	2:27

International re-issue bonus track
No.	Title	Writer(s)	Producer(s)	Length
18.	"No Tears on My Pillow"	Harrison; Thicke	Thicke; ProJay	4:02
19.	"Get Over (Outro)"	Harrison	C. Thompson; Harrison; Schwertfeger	2:27

UK re-issue bonus tracks
No.	Title	Writer(s)	Producer(s)	Length
18.	"Whatever Chick"	Harrison; Elliott	Harrison; Elliott	4:18
19.	"Case of the Ex" (Sovereign Remix)	Stewart; Hale; Tab	Stewart; Sovereign^{[d]}^{[f]}	5:42
20.	"Get Over (Outro)"	Harrison	C. Thompson; Harrison; Schwertfeger	2:27

20th anniversary edition bonus tracks
No.	Title	Writer(s)	Producer(s)	Length
19.	"No Tears on My Pillow"	Harrison; Thicke	Thicke; ProJay	4:02
20.	"For the First Time"	Harrison; Pearson	Pearson; C. Thompson	4:20
21.	"Whatever Chick"	Harrison; Elliott	Harrison; Elliott	4:18
22.	"Case of the Ex" (Sovereign Remix)	Stewart; Hale; Tab	Stewart; Sovereign^{[d]}^{[f]}	5:42
23.	"Case of the Ex" (O.M.O 2-Step Mix)	Stewart; Hale; Tab	Stewart; O.M.O.^{[f]}	3:22
24.	"Case of the Ex" (Mya Remix)	Stewart; Hale; Tab	Stewart; Damon Elliott; Harrison^{[f]}	3:28
25.	"Free" (Milk & Sugar Club Mix)	Harrison; Harris; Lewis; Richbourg; Tolbert	Jam; Lewis; Wright^{[c]}; Milk & Sugar^{[f]}	7:38
26.	"Free" (Milk & Sugar Club Mix Instrumental)	Harrison; Harris; Lewis; Richbourg; Tolbert	Jam; Lewis; Wright^{[c]}; Milk & Sugar^{[f]}	7:38
27.	"Free" (Howard & Cross Version)	Harrison; Harris; Lewis; Richbourg; Tolbert	Jam; Lewis; Wright^{[c]}; Ian Cross^{[f]}; Russell Howard^{[f]}	3:14
28.	"Free" (X Men Vocal Mix)	Harrison; Harris; Lewis; Richbourg; Tolbert	Jam; Lewis; Wright^{[c]}; X Men^{[f]}	4:20
29.	"Free" (Ricco)	Harrison; Harris; Lewis; Richbourg; Tolbert	Jam; Lewis; Wright^{[c]}; Ricco^{[f]}	4:12
30.	"The Best of Me" (Fernando Garibay Radio Mix)	Harrison; Dean; Cozier; Beal; Phillips; Tifrere	Swizz Beatz; Fernando Garibay^{[d]}; Cozier^{[b]}; Beal^{[b]}	3:26
31.	"The Best of Me" (Fernando Garibay Club Mix)	Harrison; Dean; Cozier; Beal; Phillips; Tifrere	Swizz Beatz; Garibay^{[d]}; Cozier^{[b]}; Beal^{[b]}	5:49

=== Notes ===
- ^{^[a]} signifies a vocal producer
- ^{^[b]} signifies an additional vocal producer
- ^{^[c]} signifies a co-producer
- ^{^[d]} signifies an additional producer
- ^{^[e]} signifies a Pro Tools producer
- ^{^[f]} signifies a remixer

== Personnel ==
Credits adapted from the liner notes of Fear of Flying.

Performers and musicians

- Robert Aaron – horn
- Beenie Man – vocals
- Michael Cain – keyboards
- Joe Davi – acoustic guitar
- Rick Davies – horn
- Traci Hale – backing vocals
- Norman Hedman – percussion
- Sean Hurley – bass guitar
- Jadakiss – vocals
- Elijah Joy – voice-over
- Jordan Knight – vocals
- Lisa "Left Eye" Lopes – vocals
- Maiesha Rashad – voice-over
- Marlon Williams – guitar

Technical

- Mya – vocals (lead and background), production, executive production
- Jerry Duplessis – production
- A. Islam Haqq – production, executive production
- Wyclef Jean – production
- Rodney Jerkins – production
- Kandi Burruss – co-production
- Pro-Jay – programming, production
- Chris "Tricky" Stewart – keyboards, programming, production
- Swizz Beatz – production
- Robin Thicke – programming, production
- Anthony Dent – programming, production
- Brandon Abeln – engineering
- Ralph Cacciurri – engineering
- Keith Cohen – engineering
- Kevin Crouse – engineering
- Chris Frame – engineering
- Brad Gilderman – engineering
- Jason Groucott – engineering, mix engineering
- Tal Herzberg – engineering
- Adam Holmstead – engineering
- Ricco Lumpkins – engineering
- Michael Sherman – engineering
- Brian "B Luv" Thomas – engineering
- Darrell Thorp – engineering
- Richard Travali – engineering, mix engineering
- Dylan Vaughan – mix engineering
- Kieran Wagner – engineering
- Doug Woulson – engineering
- Kevin "KD" Davis – mixing, mix engineering
- Glen Marchese – mixing
- Manny Marroquin – mixing
- Tony Maserati – mixing
- Chris Athens – mastering

== Charts ==
=== Weekly charts ===
Weekly chart performance
Chart (2000–2001)	Peak position
Australian Albums (ARIA)	28
Australian Urban Albums (ARIA)	5
Canada Top Albums/CDs (RPM)	39
Canadian R&B Albums (Nielsen SoundScan)	12
French Albums (SNEP)	102
German Albums (Offizielle Top 100)	52
New Zealand Albums (RMNZ)	39
Swiss Albums (Schweizer Hitparade)	33
UK Albums (Official Charts)	81
UK R&B Albums (Official Charts)	17
US Billboard 200	15
US Top R&B/Hip-Hop Albums (Billboard)	7

=== Year-end charts ===
2000 year-end chart performance
Chart (2000)	Position
Canadian Albums (Nielsen Soundscan)	200
US Billboard 200	144
US Top R&B/Hip-Hop Albums (Billboard)	73

2001 year-end chart performance
Chart (2001)	Position
Canadian R&B Albums (Nielsen SoundScan)	69
US Billboard 200	178

== Certifications ==
Certifications
Region	Certification	Certified units/sales
Australia (ARIA)	Gold	35,000^{^}
Canada (Music Canada)	Gold	50,000^{^}
United States (RIAA)	Platinum	1,200,000
^{^} Shipments figures based on certification alone.

== Release history ==
Release history and formats
Region	Date	Format(s)	Edition(s)	Label
United States	April 25, 2000	CD; LP; cassette	Standard	University; Interscope
Japan	April 28, 2000	CD	Standard	Universal
Germany	June 19, 2000	CD	Standard	Universal
United Kingdom	July 24, 2000	CD	Standard	Polydor
United States	November 7, 2000	CD	Re-issue	University; Interscope
United Kingdom	February 19, 2001	CD	Re-issue	Polydor
Australia	February 26, 2001	CD	Standard	Universal
Germany	May 8, 2001	CD	Re-issue	Universal
Worldwide	April 24, 2020	Digital download; streaming	20th Anniversary Edition	Universal Music Group
Worldwide	October 31, 2025	Vinyl; Digital download; streaming; (Immerse in Dolby Atmos)	25th Anniversary Edition (Complex exclusive)	Universal Music Group
