= Da King & I =

American hip hop group

- (left) Izzy Ice, (right) DJ Majesty

Background information
- Origin: New York City
- Genres: East Coast hip hop, alternative hip hop
- Years active: 1992 - 1993
- Labels: Rowdy Records; Arista Records
- Members: Izzy Ice; DJ Majesty

Da King & I was an American hip-hop duo consisting of Izzy Ice (born Isidore Francois on April 17, 1972) and DJ Majesty (born Roderick Wiggins).

== History ==
The group signed with Rowdy Records and released their debut single, "Flip da Scrip" on November 24, 1992. Their debut album Contemporary Jeep Music was released on July 13, 1993. It contained the singles "Flip Da Scrip" and "Tears." The album earned many positive reviews but was not a commercial success. The duo disbanded shortly after the release of the album.

In the late 1990s DJ Majesty launched a career as an R&B producer. He contributed to several albums including:

SWV - Release Some Tension ("Release Some Tension") RCA Records, 1998
Rufus Blaq - Credentials ("Come Alive Y'all") Perspective Records, 1998
Elusion - Think About It ("Good and Plenty") RCA Records, 1998
Before Dark - Daydreamin' ("Push N Shove") RCA Records, 2000

DJ Majesty appeared as a battle DJ in the 1992 movie Juice.

After leaving the music business, "Izzy Ice" Francois started his own internet company. He released a new song called "Milk & Cookies" in 2017.

== Discography ==
- Contemporary Jeep Music (1993)
