= Dear Diary (Cha Cha album) =

Studio album by Cha Cha
- Released: September 14, 1999
- Recorded: 1998–99
- Studio: Noontime Studios (Atlanta, GA); Triangle Sound Studios (Atlanta, GA); Hit Factory Studios (New York, NY); Studio A (Detroit, MI); Unique Recording Studios (New York, NY); DARP Studios (Atlanta, GA); Patchwerk Recording Studio (Atlanta, GA); Lion's Den Studio (New York, NY); Krosswire Studio (Atlanta, GA)
- Genre: Hip hop
- Length: 1:06:59
- Label: Epic
- Producer: Anthony Dent; Benny "Dada" Tillman; Bryan-Michael Cox; Carlos "Los Vegas" Thornton; Deric "D-Dot" Angelettie; Eric "Coptic" Matlock; Irv Gotti; Jazze Pha; J Dub; Kevin "She'kspere" Briggs; Lil' Rob; Teddy Bishop

Singles from Dear Diary
- 1. "New Millenium (What Cha Wanna Do)" Released: 1999; 2. "He Likes" Released: 1999

Professional ratings
Review scores
| Source | Rating |
|---|---|
| AllMusic | 2.5/5 stars |

Dear Diary is the only studio album by American rapper Cha Cha. It was released on September 14, 1999, through Epic Records.

Recording sessions took place at Noontime Studios, at Triangle Sound Studios, at DARP Studios, at Patchwerk Recording Studio and at Krosswire Studio in Atlanta, at Hit Factory Studios, at Unique Recording Studios and at Lion's Den Studio in New York City, and at Studio A in Detroit.

Production was handled by several high-profile R&B/hip hop record producers, including Bryan-Michael Cox, Deric "D-Dot" Angelettie, Irv Gotti, Jazze Pha and Kevin "She'kspere" Briggs. It features guest appearances from Jim Crow, Bareda, Black Child, Jagged Edge, Ja Rule, Jermaine Dupri, Juvenile, LaTocha Scott, Memphis Bleek, Nas, Trick Daddy and Madd Rapper.

The album peaked at number 86 on the US Billboard Top R&B/Hip-Hop Albums chart. Its lead single "New Millenium (What Cha Wanna Do)" peaked at number 20 in Germany, at number 68 in Switzerland and at number 28 on the US Billboard Hot Rap Songs.

== Track listing ==
| No. | Title | Lyrics | Music | Producer(s) | Length |
|---|---|---|---|---|---|
| 1. | "Intro" | Adrienne Muhammad; John Johnson; Ryan Glover; Trina Fluellen-Bradford; Wendell White | Benny Tillman; Carlos Thornton | Carlos & Dada | 1:24 |
| 2. | "New Millenium (What Cha Wanna Do)" | Parris Fluellen | Kevin Briggs | She'kspere | 4:09 |
| 3. | "M.O.M.M.Y." (featuring Nas) | Fluellen; Nasir Jones | Irving Lorenzo; Robert Mays | Irv Gotti; Lil' Rob | 4:07 |
| 4. | "Dear Diary" (featuring LaTocha Scott) | Fluellen; LaTocha Scott | Anthony Dent; Jeffrey Walker | Anthony Dent; J Dub | 5:06 |
| 5. | "I Need You (Cha, Cha, Cha)" | Fluellen | Tillman; Thornton; Sylvester Stewart | Carlos & Dada | 3:58 |
| 6. | "He Likes" (featuring Jagged Edge) | Fluellen; Brandon Casey; Brian Casey | Teddy Bishop | Teddy Bishop | 3:59 |
| 7. | "Busted" (Interlude) | Fluellen | Tillman; Thornton | Carlos & Dada | 1:57 |
| 8. | "Who Make It Hotter" (featuring Yero Brock) | Fluellen; Yero Brock | Tillman; Thornton | Carlos & Dada | 4:03 |
| 9. | "It's Like That" (featuring Trick Daddy, Jim Crow and Juvenile) | Fluellen; Damon Green; Terius Gray | Phalon Alexander | Jazze Pha | 4:32 |
| 10. | "Set It Off" | Fluellen | Tillman; Thornton | Carlos & Dada | 5:45 |
| 11. | "WhereDaPaperAt?" (featuring Ja Rule, Memphis Bleek, Black Child, Lo-Down and Bareda) | Fluellen; Devon Dowdell; Jeffrey Atkins; Malik Cox; Ramel Gill | Lorenzo; Mays | Irv Gotti; Lil' Rob | 5:15 |
| 12. | "Dear Diary" (Interlude) | Fluellen | Tillman; Thornton; Kevin Hicks | Carlos & Dada | 2:39 |
| 13. | "Here We Go Again" | Fluellen | Tillman; Thornton; Kirk Robinson; Lana Moorer; Nathaniel Robinson | Carlos & Dada | 4:15 |
| 14. | "Mad Rapper" (Skit) | Deric Angelettie | | Deric "D-Dot" Angelettie | 0:33 |
| 15. | "Sunglasses" | Fluellen | Deric Angelettie; Eric Matlock; Corey Hart; Parris Fluellen | Deric "D-Dot" Angelettie; Eric "Coptic" Matlock | 4L12 |
| 16. | "Ride Out" (featuring Jim Crow) | Fluellen; Green; Jamal Jones | Alexander | Jazze Pha | 3:27 |
| 17. | "That Broad" | Fluellen | Bryan-Michael Cox | Bryan-Michael Cox | 4:03 |
| 18. | "What Cha Wanna Do (Remix)" (featuring Jermaine Dupri) | Fluellen | Jermaine Dupri | Jermaine Dupri, Bryan-Michael Cox | 3:36 |
| Total length: | | | | | 1:06:59 |

Sample credits

- Track 5 contains a sample from "Thank You (Falettinme Be Mice Elf Agin)" performed by The Crusaders
- Track 13 contains a sample from "Shut The Eff Up (Hoe)" performed by MC Lyte
- Track 15 contains a sample of "Sunglasses at Night" performed by Corey Hart

== Personnel ==
- Parris "Cha Cha" Fluellen – main artist, vocals, vocal arrangements

Vocalists

- Nasir "Nas" Jones – featured artist, vocals, vocal arrangements
- LaTocha Scott – featured artist, backing vocals, vocal arrangements
- Brandon Casey – featured artist, backing vocals, vocal arrangements
- Brian Casey – featured artist, backing vocals, vocal arrangements
- Yero Brock – featured artist, vocals, vocal arrangements
- Damon "Mr. Mo" Green – featured artist, vocals, vocal arrangements
- Jamal "Polow da Don" Jones – featured artist, vocals, vocal arrangements
- Maurice "Trick Daddy" Young – featured artist, vocals, vocal arrangements
- Ricardo "Cutty Cartel" Lewis – featured artist, vocals, vocal arrangements
- Terius "Juvenile" Gray – featured artist, vocals, vocal arrangements
- Devon "Bareda" Dowdell – featured artist, vocals, vocal arrangements
- Jeffrey "Ja Rule" Atkins – featured artist, vocals, vocal arrangements
- Malik "Memphis Bleek" Cox – featured artist, vocals, vocal arrangements
- Ramel "Black Child" Gill – featured artist, vocals, vocal arrangements
- Deric Angelettie – featured artist, vocals, vocal arrangements
- Jermaine Dupri – featured artist, additional vocals, vocal arrangements

Instrumentalists

- Benny "Dada" Tillman – drum programming
- Carlos "Los Vegas" Thornton – drum programming
- Kevin "She'kspere" Briggs – bass, drum programming
- Irving "Irv Gotti" Lorenzo – drum programming
- Robert "Lil' Rob" Mays – drum programming
- Anthony Dent – piano, drum programming
- Jeffrey "J-Dub" Walker – piano
- Teddy Bishop – drum programming
- Phalon "Jazze Pha" Alexander – drum programming
- Kevin Hicks – guitar
- Eric "Coptic" Matlock – drum programming
- Bryan-Michael Cox – drum programming
- Donnie Scantz – additional programming

Technicals

- Benny Tillman – producer
- Carlos Thornton – producer
- Arnold "AJ" Wolfe – recording
- Kevin Briggs – recording, producer
- Alvin Speights – mixing
- Claudine Pontier – assistant mixing
- Vernon Mungo – assistant mixing
- Irving Lorenzo – producer
- Rob Mays – producer
- Ken "Duro" Ifill – mixing
- Brian Stanley – recording
- Flip Osman – assistant recording
- Steve Mazur – assistant mixing
- Anthony Dent – producer
- Jeffrey Walker – producer
- Steve Capp – recording
- Josh Butler – mixing
- Jason Hofer – assistant recording
- Billy "BC24" Calloway – assistant mixing, A&R
- Teddy Bishop – producer
- Mike Alvord – recording
- Jason Rome – recording
- Mike Wilson – recording
- Phalon Alexander – producer
- Adam Hawkins – recording
- Mario Maren – assistant recording
- Deric Angelettie – producer
- Eric Matlock – producer
- Kevin Hicks – mixing, recording
- Bryan-Michael Cox – assistant recording, re-mixing
- Jermaine Dupri – mixing
- Brian Frye – recording
- Phil Tan – mixing

Additional

- Wendell White – associate executive producer
- Ron Jaramillo – art direction, design
- Keith Major – photography
- James Hunter – graphic design
- Adrienne Muhammad – A&R
- David McPherson – A&R
- Kenyatta "Tally" Galbreth – A&R

== Charts ==
| Chart (1999) | Peak position |
|---|---|
| US Top R&B/Hip-Hop Albums (Billboard) | 86 |
