= I Need =

I Need may refer to:

- "I Need" (Kandi Burruss song) (2010)
- "I Need" (Maverick Sabre song) (2011)
- "I Need" (Meredith Brooks song) (1997)
- "I Need", a 2023 song by Macklemore from Ben
