= Kevin Briggs (music producer) =

American songwriter

Kevin "She'kspere" Briggs
- Born: Kevin Jerome Briggs
- Genres: R&B; dance-pop; hip-hop
- Occupations: Record producer; audio engineer
- Years active: 1998–present

Kevin "She'kspere" Briggs is an American record producer, known for producing the TLC #1 hit "No Scrubs" and various Destiny's Child songs from the album The Writing's on the Wall. Briggs' then girlfriend, former Xscape singer Kandi Burruss, composed the lyrics of TLC's "No Scrubs", Destiny's Child hits "Bills, Bills, Bills" and "Bug a Boo", and Pink's debut single "There You Go" to accompany his productions. Briggs' post-2000 productions saw a new sound from Briggs, as can be heard on the tracks he produced for Whitney Houston and Blu Cantrell.

Briggs also received writing credit for Ed Sheeran's Shape of You following the song's copyright controversy.

== Songwriting and production credits ==
Credits are courtesy of Discogs, Tidal, Spotify, Apple Music, and AllMusic.

Title	Year	Artist	Album
"No Scrubs"	1999	TLC	FanMail
"Don't Pull Out on Me Yet"	1999	TLC	FanMail
"So Good"	1999	Destiny's Child	The Writing's on the Wall
"Bills, Bills, Bills"	1999	Destiny's Child	The Writing's on the Wall
"Bug a Boo"	1999	Destiny's Child	The Writing's on the Wall
"Hey Ladies"	1999	Destiny's Child	The Writing's on the Wall
"She Can't Love You"	1999	Destiny's Child	The Writing's on the Wall
"X-Girlfriend"	1999	Mariah Carey	Rainbow
"Best Man"	1999	Faith Evans	The Best Man: Soundtrack
"Checkin' For Me"	1999	JoJo Robinson	Hush (Shelved)
"Ways To Get Cut Off" (Featuring Beyoncé)	1999	JoJo Robinson	Hush (Shelved)
"New Millenium (What Cha Wanna Do)"	1999	Cha Cha	Dear Diary
"Roll with Me"	1999	Blaque	Blaque
"No Pigeons"	1999	Sporty Thievz	Street Cinema
"What I'm Gon' Do to You"	2000	Kandi Burruss	Hey Kandi...
"Don't Think I'm Not"	2000	Kandi Burruss	Hey Kandi...
"Can't Come Back"	2000	Kandi Burruss	Hey Kandi...
"I Wanna Know"	2000	Kandi Burruss	Hey Kandi...
"I Won't Bite My Tongue"	2000	Kandi Burruss	Hey Kandi...
"Easier" (Featuring Faith Evans)	2000	Kandi Burruss	Hey Kandi...
"It Makes Me Ill"	2000	NSYNC	No Strings Attached
"Beautiful Women"	2000	Boyz II Men	Nathan Michael Shawn Wanya
"Good Guy"	2000	Boyz II Men	Nathan Michael Shawn Wanya
"Hell wit Ya"	2000	Pink	Can't Take Me Home
"There You Go"	2000	Pink	Can't Take Me Home
"Never Let Go"	2000	3LW	3LW
"How You Gonna Tell Me"	2000	Mya	Fear of Flying
"How Could You"	2000	Before Dark	Daydreamin'
"As Far as They Know"	2000	Before Dark	Daydreamin'
"Baby" (Featuring Solé)	2000	Before Dark	Daydreamin'
"Get Crunk Tonight"	2000	Joe	My Name Is Joe
"The Lamb's Book of Life"	2000	Sinéad O'Connor	Faith and Courage
"Phone Messages (Part 1)"	2000	So Plush	So Plush
"Pop Ya Collar"	2000	Usher	8701: International Edition
"One of Those Days"	2002	Whitney Houston	Just Whitney
"Dear John Letter"	2002	Whitney Houston	Just Whitney
"Let Your Hair Down"	2002	702	Star
"Feelings"	2002	702	Star
"Come & Knock on My Door"	2002	702	Star
"No Way"	2002	702	Star
"Holla at Me"	2002	Isyss	The Way We Do
"Stood Up"	2002	Isyss	The Way We Do
"Not Letting Him Go"	2002	Isyss	The Way We Do
"I Love You"	2003	Blu Cantrell	Bittersweet
"Bedroom"	2003	Joe	And Then...
"So Good"	2003	Nodesha	Nodesha
"Ring The Alarm"	2004	Philly's Most Wanted	Ring the Alarm
"Point A Chick Out" (Featuring Marsha Ambrosius)	2004	Philly's Most Wanted	Ring the Alarm
"Save Me"	2006	Stacie Orrico	Beautiful Awakening
"I Can't Give It Up"	2006	Stacie Orrico	Beautiful Awakening
"I’m Cold"	2013	Young Dro	High Times
"Shape of You"	2017	Ed Sheeran	÷
"Break Up with Your Girlfriend, I'm Bored"	2019	Ariana Grande	Thank U, Next
"SOS" (Featuring Aloe Blacc)	2019	Avicii	Tim
"Star-Spangled Man"	2021	The Captain America Drum Corps	The Falcon and the Winter Soldier

== Awards and nominations ==
Year	Work	Award	Result	Ref
2000	42nd Annual Grammy Awards	Grammy Award for Best R&B Song (No Scrubs)	Won	
2000	42nd Annual Grammy Awards	Grammy Award for Best R&B Song (Bills, Bills, Bills)	Nominated	
2000	42nd Annual Grammy Awards	Grammy Award for Album of the Year (FanMail)	Nominated	
2000	42nd Annual Grammy Awards	Grammy Award for Record of the Year (No Scrubs)	Nominated	
2000	MOBO Awards	Producer Of The Year	Nominated	
2020	ASCAP Pop Awards	Award-Winning Pop Songs (Break Up with Your Girlfriend, I'm Bored)	Won	
