= Bait (soundtrack) =

Soundtrack to the action-comedy film Bait

Soundtrack album by Various artists
- Released: September 12, 2000
- Recorded: 2000
- Genre: Hip hop, R&B
- Label: Warner Bros.
- Producer: Jimmy Jam and Terry Lewis, Jayo, Jason Eperson, Eddie F, Vada Nobles, Bink, Missy Elliott, Big Demi, Jamie Foxx

Singles from Bait
- 1. "Why Me?" Released: 2000; 2. "Free" Released: November 21, 2000

Professional ratings
Review scores
Source	Rating
Allmusic	3/5 stars

Bait is the soundtrack to the 2000 action-comedy film, Bait. It was released on September 12, 2000, by Warner Bros. Records and featured a blend of hip hop and R&B music. The soundtrack was not a commercial success, only making it to #49 on the Top R&B/Hip-Hop Albums, but it did feature two fairly successful singles, Mýa's "Free" peaked at #42 on the Billboard Hot 100 and #52 on the Hot R&B/Hip-Hop Singles & Tracks, and also "Why Me?" by Cuban Link & Fat Joe.

== Track listing ==
1. "Free"- 5:21 (Mýa)
2. "Why Me?"- 3:26 (Cuban Link & Fat Joe)
3. "Icey"- 4:14 (Nelly & St. Lunatics)
4. "Take It There"- 4:20 (Donell Jones)
5. "Took the Bait"- 5:14 (Scarface & Dangerous)
6. "Work"- 4:41 (The Roots & Alechia James)
7. "Quick Rush"- 3:48 (Total & Missy Elliott)
8. "L.I.Z."- 3:03 (Liz Leite)
9. "You Can Get That"- 3:48 (No Question & Bianca)
10. "I Love Being a Gangsta"- 5:11 (Major Figgas)
11. "There's Nothing Better"- 4:25 (Beanie Sigel & Memphis Bleek)
12. "Sex, Sex, Money, Money"- 4:31 (Ram Squad)
13. "Remarkable"- 4:47 (Jaheim & Terry Dexter)
14. "Can't Fuck With Me"- 3:59 (Trick Daddy, Lost Tribe & JV)
15. "Where Is the Love?"- 4:44 (Majusty)
16. "Bed Springs"- 4:01 (Jamie Foxx)
