= Teeny =

Teeny can refer to:

- A teenager or a "teenybopper"
- The state of being very small
- Trond Holter, a member of the band Wig Wam
- A small drink sold in Massachusetts and New Hampshire stores composed of water, sugar, food coloring, and artificial flavoring packaged in a small plastic clear barrel-like bottle covered with tin foil (also spelled Teenie)

== See also ==
- TeaNY
