= Free (Mya song) =

2000 single by Mýá

Single by Mýa

from the album Fear of Flying (re-issue) and Bait (soundtrack)
- Released: November 21, 2000
- Studio: Flyte Tyme (Edina, Minnesota)
- Genre: R&B; pop
- Length: 5:21 (album version); 4:11 (video version); 4:09 (pop radio mix)
- Label: Interscope
- Songwriters: Mya Harrison; Jimmy Jam and Terry Lewis; Alexander Richbourg; Tony Tolbert
- Producers: Jimmy Jam and Terry Lewis

Mýa singles chronology
| "Girls Dem Sugar" (2000) | "Free" (2000) | "Lady Marmalade" (2001) |

Music video
- "Free" on YouTube

"Free" is a song by American singer Mýa. It served as the third and final single from her second studio album, Fear of Flying (2000), in December 2000. Originally featured on the soundtrack to the 2000 film Bait, the song was one of the two tracks added to the re-release edition of Fear of Flying on November 7, 2000. It was written and composed by Jimmy Jam, Harrison, Terry Lewis, Alexander Richbourg, and Tony Tolbert. Lyrically, "Free" addresses on independence.

The song received generally mixed reviews from contemporary music critics, musically comparing it to Janet Jackson’s third studio album Control (1986). "Free" underperformed on Billboard's US Hot 100; peaking and spending two non-consecutive weeks at number 42. It was the second single by Harrison that failed to reach the coveted Top 40. It performed even worse on Billboard's component Hot R&B/Hip-Hop Singles & Tracks chart peaking at a moderately low number 52. Internationally, the single reached the top five in Australia and top 20 in the United Kingdom. The song's accompanying music video was filmed by director Dave Meyers. Harrison incorporates various dance routines throughout the video, choreographed by Brian "Footwork" Green, which won him an ACA (American Choreographer's Award) in 2001.

== Background and composition ==
Before being added to the re-release edition of Fear of Flying, "Free" was initially released as the first single to feature film Bait (2000) starring Jamie Foxx.

Co-written by Mýa, "Free" is in the key of B minor. The song's tempo is set at a moderate dance beat at 112 beats per minute in common time. Harrison's vocal range span from a F_{3} to D_{5}. The lyrics of "Free" are composed in the traditional verse-chorus form. Mýa opens the song with brief spoken lyrics. She begins the first verse, followed by the chorus leading her into the second verse. The song continues to the bridge, chorus, then fades out with Mýa's chant.

== Critical reception ==
Free garnered mixed to positive reviews. Chuck Taylor from Billboard compared the song to production duo Jimmy Jam & Terry Lewis earlier work with Janet Jackson and added: "Free" is all about being a strong, self-sufficient, independent woman—a nearly ubiquitous theme these days among female artists (check out currents songs by Destiny’s Child, Kandi, and Chanté Moore). But what comes across strongest in this song is the trademark Jimmy Jam/Terry Lewis sound. As a matter of fact, the track practically rips off what we know as the Janet Jackson style, with Mýa’s fragile voice possessing many of the same qualities as Janet’s. Acknowledging, "Free" is just a little too girly pop-sounding, even for the pop audience out there today." NME gave the song a mixed review and rated the single four out of ten stars writing, "R&B's enduring (annoying?) cutesy pie has done the double. Released a single that ties in with her butter wouldn't melt image -how else to you explain the lyrics, "I'm me/single, sexy and free"? Yes, make no mistake, this is Mýa trapped in Lolita land (check out the video below) not sure if she's the insolent girlfriend ('Case of the Ex') or, as this track would paint her, a pre-teen with no idea of her temptation, but aware that she has 'something about her'. Musically, this is right up Janet Jackson's old alley - more so before Janet found 'Control' and became obsessed with sex. So, if you're a chick who's so cute you turn yourself on, but still a virgin, this is your anthem. But of course, you'll be singing it to yourself, cos you love yourself so darn much, won't ya?! Writing for Yahoo! Music UK, Cyd Jaymes described "Free" as a mighty, bass-laden funky R&B groove with hints of Janet Jackson, Destiny's Child and J.Lo which should steam up many a window.

== Accolades ==
Rankings for "Free"
| Year | Publication | Accolade | Rank | Ref. |
|---|---|---|---|---|
| 2019 | Liveabout.com | The 100 Best Pop Songs of 2001 | 52 | |

== Chart performance ==
In the United States, for the issue dated week of February 3, 2001, "Free" was Billboard's Hot 100 “Hot Shot Debut” of the week debuting at number 76. In its third week it ascended from 74-61 issue dated week of February 17, 2001. The song reached its peak at number 41 in its fourth week ascending from 61-41 issue dated week of February 24, 2001. It spent a total of 17 consecutive weeks on the chart. It was the second single released by Harrison to miss the coveted pop Top 40. On Billboard's Hot R&B/Hip-Hop Singles & Tracks chart the song failed to achieve success; peaking at a moderately low fifty-two issue dated week of December 28, 2000.

Despite its chart placements in the U.S., "Free" was moderately successful in international territories. In Australia, "Free" became her second Top Ten (solo) third overall, it debuted at number 11 during the week of June 3, 2001. It reached its peak at number four in its sixth week during the week of July 8, 2001. It spent a total of 21 consecutive weeks altogether on the chart and was certified platinum by Australian Recording Industry Association for shipments of 70,000 units sold. It found success in the UK where it became her fifth Top 20 hit, it debuted and peaked at number 11 during the week of June 9, 2001. It spent a total of 6 consecutive weeks on the chart.

== Music video ==
The music video for "Free" was directed by Dave Meyers. Harrison explained to LAUNCH how involved she was in the making of "Free" speaking on following: the roller-skating, party dances, locking and Waacking were actually of all her concepts. Harrison got together with an underground dancer/choreographer named Brian Green (a.k.a. Brian " Footwork " Green ), and they put it together on their own. Mýa revealed it was a struggle and a fight working with someone underground because he's not established, but continued by saying that was the best thing about making "Free" because I knew him and what he had to offer and it was great. "Free" premiered on MTV's TRL and BET's 106 & Park on November 16, 2000.

== Live performances ==
Mya performed "Free" on multiple talk shows and award shows. On November 11, 2000, she performed "Free" on Soul Train. On December 7, 2000, she performed at MTV's Fashionably Loud. In February 2001, Mya performed at The Rosie O'Donnell Show. The following week, February 28, 2001, she hosted and performed at the 2001 Soul Train Music Awards. On April 17, 2001, she performed at The Queen Latifah Show.

== Track listings ==
German CD single

1. Free (Jimmy Jam & Terry Lewis Video Edit) – 4:08
2. Free (Milk & Sugar Club Mix) – 7:38

German Remix 12-inch single and vinyl single

A1 Free (Milk & Sugar Club Remix) – 7:38
A2 Free (Milk & Sugar Club Instrumental) – 7:38
B1 Free (Milk & Sugar Vocal Dub) – 5:52
B2 Free (Milk & Sugar Dub Instrumental) – 5:52

Germany 12-inch single

A1 Free (Jimmy Jam & Terry Lewis Version) – 5:21
A2 Free (Ricco Version) – 4:11
B1 Free (Howard Cross Version) – 3:14
B2 Free (Instrumental) – 4:11

Germany maxi-single

1. Free (Jimmy Jam & Terry Lewis Video Edit) – 4:08
2. Free (Ricco Version) – 4:11
3. Free (Milk & Sugar Radio Mix) – 3:23
4. Free (Howard & Cross Version) – 3:14
5. Free (Jimmy Jam & Terry Lewis Version) – 5:21
6. Free (Milk & Sugar Club Mix) – 7:38

U.S. 12-inch single and vinyl single

A1 Free (Jimmy Jam & Terry Lewis Version) – 5:21
A2 Free (Ricco Version) – 4:11
B1 Free (Howard Cross Version) – 3:14
B2 Free (Instrumental) – 4:11

European maxi-single

1. Free – 5:21
2. Free (X.Men Vocal Mix) – 4:19
3. Free (Ricco Version) – 4:11
4. Free (Video CD-ROM)

UK 12-inch single and vinyl single

A1 Free (X.Men Vocal Mix) – 4:19
A2 Free (Milk & Sugar Club Mix) – 7:38
B1 Free (X.Men Dub) – 4:56
B2 Free (Milk & Sugar Dub)

UK 12-inch single and vinyl single

A1 Free (Original Mix)
A2 Free (Ricco Version)
B Free (X-Men Vocal Mix)

Australia maxi-single and enhanced CD

1. Free (Album Version) – 5:16
2. Free (Milk & Sugar Mix) – 3:23
3. Free (Howard & Cross Version) – 4:20
4. Case Of The Ex (Mýa Remix) – 3:31
5. Free (Milk & Sugar Club Mix) – 7:28
6. Free (Milk & Sugar Club Mix Instrumental) – 7:28
7. Video Free

== Credits and personnel ==
Credits adapted from the liner notes of Fear of Flying.

=== Recording ===
- Recorded at Flyte Tyme Studios (Edina, Minnesota)
- Mixed at Flyte Tyme Studios (Edna, Minnesota)

=== Personnel ===
- Jimmy Jam and Terry Lewis – production
- "Big Jim" Wright – co-production
- Steve Hodge – recording engineer, mixing
- Brad Yost – recording engineer assistance
- Xavier Smith – recording engineer assistance

== Charts ==
=== Weekly charts ===
| Chart (2000–2001) | Peak position |
|---|---|
| Australia (ARIA) | 4 |
| Australian Urban (ARIA) | 3 |
| Belgium (Ultratip Bubbling Under Flanders) | 2 |
| Belgium (Ultratip Bubbling Under Wallonia) | 8 |
| Canada Airplay (BDS) | 25 |
| Europe (European Hot 100 Singles) | 46 |
| Germany (GfK) | 66 |
| Ireland (IRMA) | 35 |
| Netherlands (Dutch Top 40 Tipparade) | 2 |
| Netherlands (Single Top 100) | 41 |
| Poland (Polish Airplay Charts) | 12 |
| Scotland Singles (OCC) | 21 |
| Switzerland (Schweizer Hitparade) | 76 |
| UK Singles (OCC) | 11 |
| UK Dance (OCC) | 6 |
| UK Hip Hop/R&B (OCC) | 5 |
| US Billboard Hot 100 | 42 |
| US Hot R&B/Hip-Hop Songs (Billboard) | 52 |
| US Pop Airplay (Billboard) | 13 |
| US Rhythmic Airplay (Billboard) | 11 |

=== Year-end charts ===
| Chart (2001) | Position |
|---|---|
| Australia (ARIA) | 32 |
| US Mainstream Top 40 (Billboard) | 75 |
| US Rhythmic Top 40 (Billboard) | 45 |

== Certifications ==
| Region | Certification | Certified units/sales |
|---|---|---|
| Australia (ARIA) | Platinum | 70,000^{^} |
^{^} Shipments figures based on certification alone.

== Release history ==
| Region | Release date | Format(s) | Label | Ref. |
|---|---|---|---|---|
| United States | November 21, 2000 | Rhythmic contemporary; urban radio | Interscope | |
| United States | January 23, 2001 | Contemporary hit radio | Interscope | |
| Australia | May 21, 2001 | CD single (1) | Interscope | |
| United Kingdom | May 28, 2001 | 12-inch single; CD single; cassette single | Interscope | |
| United Kingdom | June 11, 2001 | 12-inch remix vinyl | Interscope | |
| Australia | July 16, 2001 | CD single (2) | Interscope | |
