= The Best of Me (Mya song) =

2000 single by Mýa and Jadakiss

Single by Mýa featuring Jadakiss

from the album Fear of Flying
- Released: April 11, 2000
- Studio: Avatar, The Hit Factory (New York City)
- Length: 4:12
- Label: Interscope
- Songwriters: Teron Beal; Jimmy Cozier; Kasseem Dean; Mya Harrison; Jason Phillips; Mashonda Tifrere
- Producer: Swizz Beatz

Mýa singles chronology
"My First Night with You" (1999)	"The Best of Me" (2000)	"Case of the Ex" (2000)

Jadakiss singles chronology
"Ruff Ryders' Anthem (Remix)" (1998)	"The Best of Me" (2000)	"Got It All" (2000)

Music video
- "The Best of Me" on YouTube

"The Best of Me" is a song by American singer Mýa. It served as her first single from her second studio album Fear of Flying (2000) and featured Yonkers rapper Jadakiss. The song was written and composed by the latter and Mya along with Teron Beal, Jimmy Cozier, Swizz Beatz and Mashonda Tifrere. Lyrically, "The Best of Me" addresses a woman holding off being intimate with a man.

The song received generally positive reviews from contemporary music critics. "The Best of Me" underperformed on the US Billboard Hot 100, peaking and spending two non-consecutive weeks at number 50. It fared better on the component Hot R&B/Hip-Hop Singles & Tracks chart, peaking within the top 20 at number 14. Internationally, the song entered the top 40 in Germany, peaking at number 26. The song was sent to radio stations on April 11, 2000, and the accompanying music video was serviced to video outlets a month prior, on March 6, 2000. Mya's love interest was portrayed by A&R Marquis Collins.

== Background and release ==
"The Best of Me" was composed by Mýa and Swizz Beatz, along with singers Teron Beal, Jimmy Cozier, Mashonda, and rapper Jadakiss, the latter of which is also featured vocally on the song. Originally expected to be recorded by rapper DMX in a Miami recording session with Swizz, the instrumental of the song was left unused until the producer returned to New York City to start work on Mya's album at The Hit Factory. Upon accidentally pushing a button in the studio, Mya's management reportedly "jumped up and said 'That's it, that's it'." When recording "The Best of Me" producer Swizz Beatz admired Mya's work ethic, commenting, she's as dedicated to mastering vocals as she is to dance. He noted, "She takes everything seriously when it comes to the music citing "she's a perfectionist". However, Mya clarified, "I'm not a perfectionist but I like to improve." An eleventh hour addition, the record was among the last tracks that were recorded for the Fear of Flying album. Jadakiss, a member of the Ruff Ryders Entertainment's group The LOX, came aboard as a result of label connections with Interscope Records.

Speaking on the message of the uptempo track with "a lot of meanings", Mya explained: "[It] talks about thinking about consequences before you make a decision, especially decisions made when you're in a situation of the heat of the moment, when passion and infatuation and seduction and all these things are taking place, and you're actually liking it. However, as a female, things do happen to you that you must carry on after the fact, so you're trying to weigh the consequences and make a decision based on what you know, and you may not know much about this person. It's just about setting standards for yourself and what you want." Before "The Best of Me" was chosen as the lead single from Fear of Flying, Mya initially expected reggae-influenced "Lie Detector" to be released as her next single.

== Critical reception ==
Upon its release, "The Best of Me" received generally favorable reviews from contemporary music critics. While reviewing Fear of Flying, AllMusic's Jose F. Promis praised "The Best of Me" highlighting "The Best of Me" as arguably the best song on the album while noting it as "one of the better pop songs of 2000". Billboard magazine called "The Best of Me" a "dreamy midtempo tune". "The Best of Me" was featured on The Village Voice's Pazz & Jop end of the year critics list.

== Commercial performance ==
In the United States, "The Best of Me" made its debut at number 85 on the Billboard Hot 100 issue dated week of April 15, 2000. It reached its peak of number 50 on the issue dated May 20, 2000. In total, the song spent 17 consecutive weeks on the chart. "The Best of Me" performed better on the Billboard Hot R&B/Hip-Hop Singles & Tracks chart, debuting at number 70 on the issue dated April 1, 2000. It ascended to number 40 during its second week on the chart. The song continued to rise up the chart, ascending to number 27 on the issue dated April 15, 2000. It reached its peak at number 14 on May 20, 2000, becoming Mya's fourth consecutive solo top-40 hit as well as her sixth overall hit on that chart.

"The Best of Me" charted in several international markets. In the Netherlands, it debuted and peaked at number 75 on the Single Top 100 during the week of August 29, 2001. It debuted and peaked at number 64 on Switzerland's Swiss Hitparade chart during the week of July 23, 2000. It spent a total of eight consecutive weeks on that chart. It reached the top 40 in Germany, peaking at number 25.

== Music video ==
A music video for "The Best of Me" was directed by Chris Robinson. The clip starts with Mýa practicing a dance routine to an instrumental version of DMX's "Good Girls, Bad Guys" (1999) alongside two female dancers in a dance studio. Next to Jadakiss, Styles P and Sheek Louch from his group The Lox co-star, with actress LaNease Adams and entertainer Christina Milian also appearing in the clip, portraying Mýa's friends. The video was serviced to video outlets on March 6, 2000, before a commercial release date was determined. and premiered four days later on MTV's countdown show TRL.

== Live performances ==
On April 17, 2000, Mya performed "The Best of Me" with Jadakiss on MTV's House of Style. On May 29, 2000, she performed at the 2000 World Music Awards.

== Legacy ==
Atlanta rapper Father recorded and released a cover version of "The Best of Me."

== Track listings ==
UK/European maxi-single enhanced CD
No.	Title	Writer(s)	Producer(s)	Length
1.	"The Best of Me" (LP Version)	Teron Beal; Jimmy Cozier; Kasseem Dean; Mya Harrison; Jason Phillips; Mashonda Tifrere	Swizz Beatz	4:12
2.	"The Best of Me" (Holla Remix) (featuring Jadakiss)	Beal; Cozier; Dean; Harrison; Phillips; Tifrere	Swizz Beatz; Fernando Garibay^{[A]}	3:52
3.	"My First Night with You" (LP Version)	Babyface; Diane Warren	Daryl Simmons	5:39
4.	"It's All About Me" (featuring Sisqó)	Darryl "Day" Pearson; Mark Andrews	Pearson	4:24
5.	"The Best of Me" (Enhanced Video Track)

US CD single
No.	Title	Writer(s)	Producer(s)	Length
1.	"The Best of Me" (LP Version)	Beal; Cozier; Dean; Harrison; Phillips; Tifrere	Swizz Beatz	4:10
2.	"The Best of Me" (Holla Remix) (featuring Jadakiss)	Beal; Cozier; Dean; Harrison; Phillips; Tifrere	Swizz Beatz; Fernando Garibay^{[A]}	3:25
3.	"The Best of Me" (Holla Club Remix) (featuring Jadakiss)	Beal; Cozier; Dean; Harrison; Phillips; Tifrere	Swizz Beatz; Garibay^{[A]}	5:48

US 12-inch single
No.	Title	Writer(s)	Producer(s)	Length
1.	"The Best of Me" (Main Vs.)	Beal; Cozier; Dean; Harrison; Phillips; Tifrere	Swizz Beatz	4:20
2.	"The Best of Me" (Instrumental)	Beal; Cozier; Dean; Harrison; Phillips; Tifrere	Swizz Beatz	4:19
3.	"The Best of Me" (Accapella)	Beal; Cozier; Dean; Harrison; Phillips; Tifrere	Swizz Beatz	4:19
4.	"The Best of Me" (Main Vs.)	Beal; Cozier; Dean; Harrison; Phillips; Tifrere	Swizz Beatz	4:20
5.	"The Best of Me" (Instrumental)	Beal; Cozier; Dean; Harrison; Phillips; Tifrere	Swizz Beatz	4:19
6.	"The Best of Me" (Accapella)	Beal; Cozier; Dean; Harrison; Phillips; Tifrere	Swizz Beatz	4:19

Notes

- ^{^[A]} denotes remix producer

== Credits and personnel ==
Credits lifted from the liner notes of Fear of Flying.

Recording

- Recorded at Avatar Studios and The Hit Factory (New York City)
- Mixed at The Hit Factory (New York City)

=== Personnel ===
- Teron Beal – additional vocal production, writing
- Jimmy Cozier – additional vocal production, writing
- Kevin Crouse – recording engineer
- Swizz Beatz – production, writing
- Mya Harrison – vocals, writing
- Tony Maserati – mixing engineer
- Jason "Jadakiss" Phillips – writing
- Mashonda Tifrere – writing
- Kiran Wagner – recording engineer

== Charts ==
=== Weekly charts ===
Weekly chart performance
Chart (2000–2001)	Peak position
Germany (GfK)	26
Netherlands (Dutch Top 40 Tipparade)	10
Netherlands (Single Top 100)	75
Switzerland (Schweizer Hitparade)	64
US Billboard Hot 100	50
US Hot R&B/Hip-Hop Songs (Billboard)	14
US Rhythmic Airplay (Billboard)	18

=== Year-end charts ===
Year-end chart performance
Chart (2000)	Position
US Hot R&B/Hip-Hop Singles & Tracks (Billboard)	59

== Release history ==
Release dates and formats for "The Best of Me"
Country	Release date	Format(s)	Label	Ref.
United States	April 11, 2000	Rhythmic contemporary radio	Interscope	
United States	April 11, 2000	Urban contemporary radio	Interscope	
Germany	June 5, 2000	Maxi single; Enhanced CD	Interscope	
