= Elijah Joy =

American singer

- Born: Erik C. Nedd; 15 May 1985 (age 41)
- Presenting career
- Country: United States

Elijah Joy (born Erik C. Nedd) is an American vegan celebrity chef, green living advocate, emcee, television host, singer, and writer. He is the founder of Organic Soul, Incorporated, a vegan lifestyle and multimedia company based in Takoma Park, Maryland, and the creator of Go-Go Greens, a raw food vegan deli product. Organic Soul was a sponsor of Al Gore's 2009 Green Inaugural Ball.

Joy was the personal chef for Isaac Hayes and became a semi-regular feature on WRKS' The Isaac Hayes and Friends Show in 1997. He would later become a live emcee at B.B. King's Blues Club and Grill and debuted Go-Go Greens at Moby's vegetarian eatery and tea shop Teany, both in New York City.

Joy was a featured voice-over artist on singer Mýa Harrison's album Fear of Flying. His work has also been featured on The Wendy Williams Show, E! Entertainment Television, Bravo, and MTV.

In 2010, Joy mass-produced Go-Go Greens for wider distribution to coincide with the publication of vegan nutritionist Tracye McQuirter's book By Any Greens Necessary. That year he also opened Organic Soul's first retail outlet in Union Station, Washington, D.C., as a vegan pop-up store. In 2012 he opened his second vegan pop-up retail location in Oakland's Chinatown.

On October 28, 2011, Joy appeared on Oprah's Lifeclass speaking about lessons of forgiveness and joy in the wake of his parents' death by murder-suicide.

Since moving back to his hometown of Washington, D.C., Joy has been partnering with civic and nonprofit organizations to provide food to food-insecure areas in the city's Ward 8. His work in cooperative development was featured in the October 2016 issue of Yes! Magazine and has been documented in a short film series by students from American University's Center for Media and Social Impact.

== See also ==
- List of vegans
