= New Millenium (What Cha Wanna Do) =

1999 debut single by Cha Cha

Single by Cha Cha

from the album Dear Diary
- Released: 1999
- Recorded: 1999
- Studio: Triangle Sound Studios (Atlanta, GA)
- Genre: Contemporary R&B; hip hop
- Length: 4:09
- Label: Noontime Records; Epic
- Composer: Kevin "She'kspere" Briggs
- Lyricist: Parris Fluellen
- Producer: Kevin "She'kspere" Briggs

Cha Cha singles chronology
"New Millenium (What Cha Wanna Do)" (1999)	"He Likes" (1999)

Music video
- "New Millenium (What Cha Wanna Do)" on YouTube

Professional ratings
Review scores
Source	Rating
AllMusic	1.5/5 stars

"New Millenium (What Cha Wanna Do)" is a song written and performed by American rapper Parris "Cha Cha" Fluellen. It was released in 1999 via Noontime/Epic Records as the lead single from her debut studio album Dear Diary. Recording sessions took place at Triangle Sound Studios in Atlanta. Production was handled by Kevin "She'kspere" Briggs. The remix version features American rapper and producer Jermaine Dupri.

An accompanying music video was directed by Rubin Whitmore II and released to promote the song. It was added on the New Ons on The Box and gained a lot of exposure and spins. The single peaked at number 20 in Germany, at number 68 in Switzerland, and reached number 28 on the Billboard Hot Rap Songs chart in the United States.

== Track listing ==
Vinyl 12" 33 ⅓ RPM
No.	Title	Length
1.	"New Millenium (What Cha Wanna Do) (Radio Edit)"	3:59
2.	"New Millenium (What Cha Wanna Do) (Album Version)"	4:09
3.	"New Millenium (What Cha Wanna Do) (Instrumental)"	4:03
4.	"Busted (Interlude)"	1:57
5.	"Don't Stop (Album Version)" (featuring Babydoll)	4:03
6.	"Don't Stop (Instrumental)"	4:03
7.	"Don't Stop (A Cappella)" (featuring Babydoll)	4:02
Total length:		26:16

== Personnel ==
- Parris "Cha Cha" Fluellen – lyrics, vocals, vocal arrangement
- Kevin "She'kspere" Briggs – all instruments, producer, recording
- Alvin Speights – mixing
- Claudine Pontier – assistant mixing
- Vernon Mungo – assistant mixing

== Charts ==
Chart (1999)	Peak position
Germany (GfK)	20
Switzerland (Schweizer Hitparade)	68
US Hot Rap Songs (Billboard)	28
