= Hey Kandi... =

Studio album by Kandi Burruss
- Released: September 19, 2000
- Recorded: March–July 2000
- Genre: R&B; pop
- Length: 49:13
- Label: Columbia
- Producer: Kandi Burruss; Kevin "Shekspere" Briggs; Sam Salter; Katrina Willis; Laney Stewart; Bernard Edwards Jr.

Kandi Burruss chronology
| Hey Kandi... (2000) | Fly Above EP (2009) |

Singles from Hey Kandi
- 1. "Don't Think I'm Not" Released: August 18, 2000; 2. "Cheatin' on Me" Released: January 16, 2001

Professional ratings
Review scores
| Source | Rating |
|---|---|
| AllMusic | 4/5 stars |
| NME | 2.5/5 stars |

Hey Kandi... is the debut solo studio album by American singer Kandi Burruss, released by Columbia Records on September 19, 2000 (see 2000 in music) in North America.

Co-produced by Kandi and Kevin "She'kspere" Briggs, It debuted at number 72 on the US Billboard 200 and number 32 on the Billboard Top R&B/Hip-Hop albums chart. It spawned two singles with "Don't Think I'm Not" and "Cheatin' on Me".

As of September 2009, 260,000 units of the album have been sold in the United States and 325,000 units of the album worldwide.

== Background ==
After Xscape disbanded in 1998, Burruss broke away from singing for a while and focused on writing songs for other artists. In March 2000, Burruss was signed to Columbia Records, she began working on her debut album the same month with producer Kevin "She'kspere" Briggs. After she finished the album in July, she released her first single "Don't Think I'm Not" the same month.

== Singles ==
- "Don't Think I'm Not" was released as the first single from the album on August 18, 2000. The song reached number 24 on the Billboard Hot 100 and number 32 on Billboard's Hot R&B/Hip-Hop Singles & Tracks. A music video was released in August 2000.
- "Cheatin' on Me" was released as the second single from the album on January 16, 2001. The song saw minor to moderate success only with peak positions of number 72 on the Hot R&B/Hip-Hop Songs chart. A music video was released in August 2000.

== Track listing ==
1. "Introduction" (Kandi Burruss, Bernard Edwards Jr.) - 0:49
2. "Hey Kandi" (K. Burruss, B. Edwards Jr.) - 4:29
3. "Cheatin' on Me" (K. Burruss, S. Salter) - 3:54
4. "What I'm Gon' Do to You" (Kevin "Shekspere" Briggs, B. Edwards, Jr., K. Burruss, Sam Salter) - 3:50
5. "Don't Think I'm Not" (K. Briggs, K. Burruss, B. Edwards Jr., K. Willis) - 4:03
6. "Pants on Fire" (K. Burruss, B. Edwards Jr., K. Willis) - 4:21
7. "Can't Come Back" (K. Briggs, K. Burruss, O. Harper) - 4:02
8. "I Wanna Know" (K. Briggs, K. Burruss) - 3:39
9. "Talking 'Bout Me" (K. Burruss, B. Edwards Jr., D. Gentry, K. Willis) - 4:28
10. "Sucka for You" (K. Burruss, B. Edwards Jr., T. Hale) - 3:52
11. "I Won't Bite My Tongue" (K Briggs, K. Burruss, T. Johnson) - 3:44
12. "Just So You Know" (P. Stewart, L. Tab, K. Willis) - 4:33
13. "Easier" (featuring Faith Evans) (K. Briggs, K. Burruss, T. Cottle, G. Smith) - 4:23
14. "Outro" (K. Burruss, B. Edwards Jr.) - 0:44
15. "Don't Think I'm Not" (Ear Kandi Remix) - 4:03 [Japanese Bonus Track]

== Charts ==
| Chart (2000) | Peak position |
|---|---|
| Australian Albums (ARIA) | 100 |
| Canadian R&B Albums (Nielsen SoundScan) | 46 |
| UK Albums (OCC) | 129 |
| UK R&B Albums (OCC) | 22 |
| US Billboard 200 | 72 |
| US Top R&B/Hip-Hop Albums (Billboard) | 32 |
