= Cheatin' on Me =

2001 single by Kandi Burruss

Single by Kandi Burruss

from the album Hey Kandi...
- Released: January 16, 2001
- Recorded: 2000
- Genre: R&B
- Label: Columbia
- Songwriter(s): Kandi Burruss; Kevin "She'kspere" Briggs
- Producer(s): Kevin "She'kspere" Briggs

Kandi Burruss singles chronology
"Don't Think I'm Not" (2000)	"Cheatin' on Me" (2001)	"Crew Deep" (2002)

"Cheatin' on Me" was released as one of two singles from American R&B singer Kandi Burruss' debut album Hey Kandi. The song saw minor to moderate success only with peak positions of number 72 on the Hot R&B/Hip-Hop Songs chart. The music video was released and received primarily limited airplay on BET.

The single release also featured a Trackmasters remix featuring 50 Cent, in his first released appearance since his 2000 shooting.

== Track listing ==
US CD Single
No.	Title	Length
1.	"Cheatin' On Me" (Track Masters Remix (Clean W/No Rap))	2:53
2.	"Cheatin' On Me" (Track Masters Remix (Clean W/No Rap - Featuring 50 Cent))	2:53
3.	"Cheatin' On Me" (A-Foc-Alipse Remix (Clean))	3:46
4.	"Cheatin' On Me" (Track Masters Remix (Instrumental))	2:53
5.	"Cheatin' On Me" (LP Version)	3:54

US 12" Single
No.	Title	Length
1.	"Cheatin' On Me" (Track Masters Remix)	2:53
2.	"Cheatin' On Me" (A-Foc-Alipse Remix)	3:46
3.	"Cheatin' On Me" (Track Masters Remix featuring 50 Cent)	2:53
4.	"Cheatin' On Me" (A Cappella)	2:53
5.	"Cheatin' On Me" (A Capella Part 2)	3:54
6.	"Cheatin' On Me" (Track Masters Remix (Instrumental))	2:53

== Charts ==
Chart	Peak position	Ref
Hot R&B/Hip-Hop Songs	72	
