= Fly Above EP =

EP by Kandi Burruss
- Released: October 29, 2009
- Recorded: 2008–2009
- Genre: R&B
- Label: Kandi Koated Entertainment

Kandi Burruss chronology
Hey Kandi... (2000)	Fly Above EP (2009)	Kandi Koated (2010)

Singles from Fly Above EP
- 1. "Fly Above" Released: October 6, 2009

Fly Above EP is the first EP by American singer-songwriter Kandi Burruss. It was scheduled for release on November 10, 2009 but was pushed up to October 29, 2009 on Kandi's own record label, Kandi Koated Entertainment.

Kandi decided to release her debut EP and second album separately in order to promote her new single "Fly Above" and to finally release her long-awaited second album in the first quarter of 2010.

The EP debuted at #197 on the Billboard 200 in November 2009.

== Track listing ==
No.	Title	Producer(s)	Length
1.	"Fly Above"	Drumma Boy	3:51
2.	"Must Be Good"	Jazze Pha	4:00
3.	"I Like Him" (featuring Rick Ross & Rasheeda)	Nitti	4:22
4.	"I Just Know"	Kuya Productions	4:14
5.	"Trade Him In" (featuring Gucci Mane)	Drumma Boy	4:05

== Charts ==
Chart (2009)	Peak position
US Billboard 200	197
