= Elusion =

American R&B group

Elusion was a female R&B group that consisted of two separate sets of identical twin sisters, Tamica and Tanya Johnson, and Michelle and Marie Harris. They only released one album as a group, Think About It in 1998.

Michelle and Marie were born in San Diego, California while Tamica and Tanya are from Selma, Alabama. They teamed up to form the group, Elusion. Their debut album included their mildly received single, "Reality". The song has since achieved cult status. The album is notable for also including production by Missy Elliott before she became famous, on the track titled "Good and Plenty".

Tanya and Tamica formed a group called Nubreed.

== Discography ==
Albums

- 1998: Think About It (RCA)

Singles

- 1997: "Reality"
