= Teany =

Tea café, restaurant and beverage distributor

Coordinates: 40°43′13″N 73°59′20″W

Teany cafe
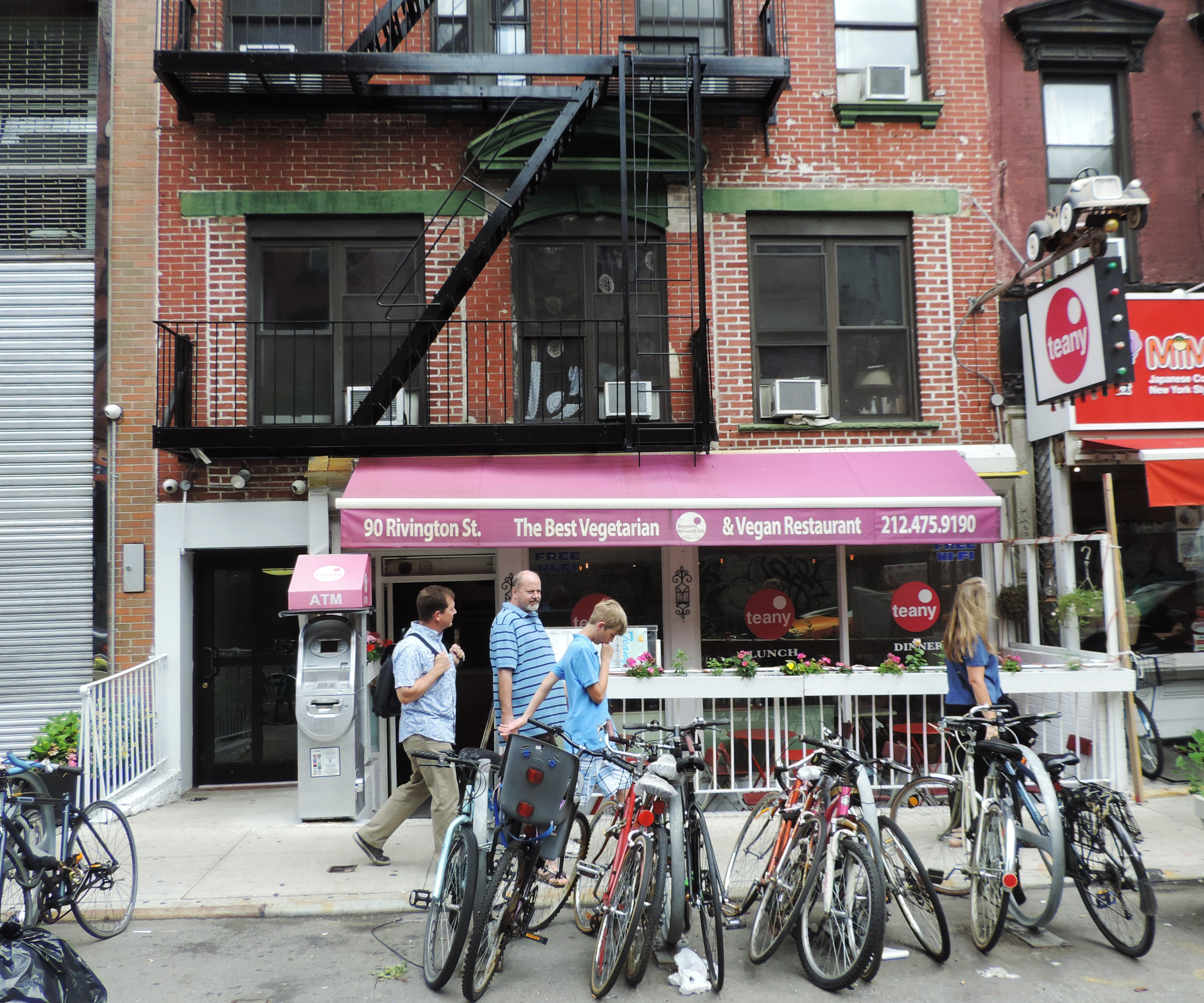
- Industry: Restaurants; Retail tea Retail beverages
- Founded: May 2002
- Founder: Moby and Kelly Tisdale
- Defunct: October 2015
- Headquarters: 90 Rivington Street; New York City, NY
- Products: tea, vegan food
- Owner: Kelly Tisdale
- Website: teanynewyork.com

Teany, sometimes stylized as TeaNY or teany, was a tea café, restaurant and beverage distributor in New York City founded by electronic musician Moby with ex-girlfriend, Kelly Tisdale. The Teany Café opened in 2002 on the Lower East Side of Manhattan, New York at 90 Rivington Street and closed in 2015.

The cafe was known for its assortment of teas, vegan options, and its decor, most of which was designed by Moby himself. Teany also featured, during the first few months of its opening, the raw food specialty, Go-Go Greens, by vegan celebrity chef, Elijah Joy. Teany made a brief appearance in Moby's 18 B Sides + DVD. In January 2006, Teany was refocused as more of a traditional tea house and offered less food. Kelly took on a larger role on the business side of Teany with Moby taking a smaller one.

On June 19, 2009 a fire caused minimal damage to the tea house. Nobody was hurt and, according to Moby's online journal, it was Kelly's decision whether the cafe was going to be rebuilt or not. The tea house reopened in May 2010, briefly rebranded as Teany-ssimo, later reverting to the original name. Teany was shuttered for good in December 2015.

The beverage company distributed tea–juice mixtures to a number of shops around New York and New Jersey. In 2005, UK-based suburb secured an exclusive deal to sell Teany beverages and tea at its stores in Manchester and London.

The company allowed liberal pronunciation of the brand name, proclaiming, “you can pronounce it however you like. tea-knee. tee-nee. tea-enn-why,” and going on to state that Moby and Kelly themselves pronounce it “teenie”.
