= Revlon Run Walk =

Semiannual cancer fundraiser

The Revlon Run/Walk for Women was a 5km walkathon event dedicated to fighting cancer. Two run/walk events were held annually in Los Angeles, California and New York City. Participants could run or walk and it was often attended by celebrities and well-known community figures. All proceeds were used to help fight cancer, specifically women's cancers such as breast cancer, ovarian cancer, and uterine cancer through awareness, research, patient counseling, and outreach programs. Money was raised through sponsor donations, runner pledges, and outside public support via text message and social media.

== History ==
The event was founded in 1994 by cancer survivor Lilly Tartikoff and Revlon chairman Ronald Perelman. To date, the two annual runs have raised over $70 million for cancer awareness, research, patient counseling and outreach programs. In 2016, the Entertainment Industry Foundation and Revlon announced that they would no longer host the events, bringing the Revlon Run/Walk to an end.

== Celebrity attendees ==
Numerous celebrities, including Aaliyah, Jessica Alba, Nate Berkus, Halle Berry, Jessica Biel, Julie Bowen, Ciara, Jennifer Connelly, Sheryl Crow, Kristin Davis, James Denton, Karen Duffy, Jimmy Fallon, Alyson Hannigan, Mariska Hargitay, Marg Helgenberger, Carrie Ann Inaba, the Jonas Brothers, Queen Latifah, Jesse L. Martin, Dylan McDermott, Demi Moore, Mandy Moore, Mehmet Oz, Tom Selleck, and Justin Timberlake have attended the event. Singers Keyshia Cole, Kimberley Locke and Trey Songz also attended the event and gave performances.

== Sponsors ==
Cosmetic company and event co-founder Revlon is still the event's largest sponsor. Other major sponsors for the Los Angeles event include the Entertainment Industry Foundation, Macy's, Toyota, Northrop Grumman, Aquafina, and ABC 7. Additional major sponsors for the New York event include the Entertainment Industry Foundation, Toyota, People (magazine), and NBC 4. Around 30 other companies and organizations have also sponsored the event.
