= Katrina C. Willis =

Katrina Willis
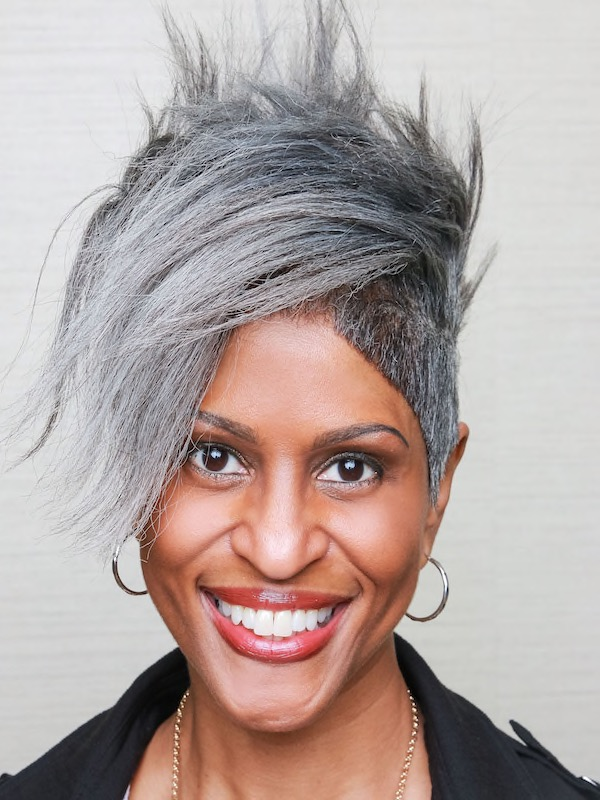

Background information
- Born: Katrina C. Willis; October 2, 1971 (age 55); Kettering, Ohio, United States
- Genres: R&B; Pop
- Occupations: Singer; Songwriter; Producer
- Instruments: Vocals; Piano; Drums; Guitar
- Years active: 1998–present
- Website: willisongsinc.com

Katrina C. Willis (born October 2, 1971) is a singer/songwriter, musician and producer. She was one of four co-writers of Aretha Franklin's Grammy Award-winning single "Wonderful". and Luther Vandross's "Say It Now". With two others she wrote The Temptations' "I'm Here", and was one of four co-writers of singer/songwriter-turned-Reality T.V. personality Kandi Burruss's solo debut single "Don't Think I'm Not". She also wrote movie soundtracks, including Big Momma's House.

== Early life ==
Katrina C. Willis was born in Kettering, Ohio, the youngest of four children.

== Career ==
In 1998 through Ian Burke's affiliation with So So Def Records founder Jermaine Dupri and his publishing company Air Control Music, then EMI Music Publishing Executive Leotis Clyburn signed her to a co-publishing deal under EMI/Air Control Music (acquired in 2018 by Sony/ATV.) As a writer with EMI Music Publishing/Air Control Willis had the opportunity to collaborate with various writers, artists, and producers.

Willis's song "Just So You Know", co-written with Laney Stewart and Tab, was included on Kandi's 2000 album Hey Kandi...

In 2004 she recorded and released her own album, through her own independent label Willisongs, Inc. titled K. Willis & The Collection
