= Jim Crow (group) =

Rap group

- Origin: Atlanta, Georgia, U.S.
- Genres: Hip hop
- Years active: 1997–2005
- Labels: Noontime Music Inc.; Orca; Epic; Interscope
- Past members: Polow da Don; Cutty Cartel (deceased); Mr. Mo

Jim Crow was a hip hop trio from Atlanta, Georgia, formed in 1997 and composed of rappers Polow da Don, Cutty Cartel, and Mr. Mo.

The group signed with Epic Records in 1999. Their debut studio album, Crow's Nest (1999), peaked at number 99 on Billboard's Top R&B/Hip-Hop Albums chart. Its lead single, "That Drama (Baby's Mama)" (featuring Too Short), peaked at number 25 on the Hot Rap Songs chart. English-American rapper Slick Rick guest appeared on the group's second album, Right Quick (2001), which was the trio's final release before disbanding in 2005.

== Critical reception ==
Vibe called the debut "exceptional," writing that the group "come off lovely in the lyrics department, rocking rushed conversational flows and tight rhymes that are often filled with satire." The Atlanta Constitution deemed it "a debut outstanding in its near sample-free production and well-rounded in its storytelling." The Republican concluded that "there's a synchronicity to the rapid rhymes of Mr. Mo, Cartel and Polow, a solid flow that adds depth to tracks like the tough-talkin' 'Bandits', and the dope 'n' drink groove-fest 'Low, Low'."

Billboard thought that "the group's controversial name is a tip-off to its secret weapon—they're serious jokesters ... Not for the light-hearted, Crow's Nest is an amalgam of bluesy beats and tragic parables." The Cincinnati Post awarded the debut an A+, and determined that "Mr. Mo, Cartel and Polow display dizzying rhyme excursions draped over inventively thumping beats packed with soulful hooks ... The group comfortably alternates among raw hard-core, party anthems, comical tracks and thought-provoking fare."

== Discography ==
=== Albums ===
- Crow's Nest (1999)
- Right Quick (2001)

=== Singles ===
- "Bandits" (1999)
- "That Drama (Baby's Mama)" (featuring Jazze Pha and Too Short) (1999)
- "Holla at a Playa" (featuring Sean Paul of Youngbloodz and Jazze Pha) (2002)
- '"Hot Wheels" (2002)
