= Don't Think I'm Not =

2000 single by Kandi Burruss

Single by Kandi

from the album Hey Kandi...
- B-side: "Can't Come Back"; "What I'm Gon' Do to You"
- Released: July 11, 2000
- Studio: Triangle Sound (Atlanta, Georgia)
- Genre: R&B; Atlanta bass
- Length: 4:03 (album version); 3:51 (radio edit)
- Label: Columbia
- Songwriters: Kevin "She'kspere" Briggs; Kandi Burruss; Katrina Willis; Bernard Edwards, Jr.
- Producers: Kevin "She'kspere" Briggs; Kandi

Kandi singles chronology
"4, 5, 6" (1999)	"Don't Think I'm Not" (2000)	"Cheatin' on Me" (2001)

Music video
- "Don't Think I'm Not" on YouTube

"Don't Think I'm Not" is a song by American R&B singer Kandi from her debut album, Hey Kandi... (2000). Kandi co-wrote the song with Kevin "She'kspere" Briggs, Katrina Willis, and Bernard Edwards Jr. and produced it alongside Briggs. Released as Kandi's debut solo single on July 11, 2000, "Don't Think I'm Not" reached number 24 on the US Billboard Hot 100 and number 32 on the Billboard Hot R&B/Hip-Hop Singles & Tracks chart. Outside the US, the song reached the top 20 in Australia, the Netherlands, New Zealand, and the United Kingdom.

== Chart performance ==
"Don't Think I'm Not" debuted at number 66 on the Billboard Hot 100 the week ending August 5, 2000. The single then peaked at number 24, the week ending October 7, 2000. The single made its final chart appearance on the week ending January 13, 2001, at number 41.

== Music video ==
Kandi released a video for "Don't Think I'm Not" in 2000, directed by Bille Woodruff. Kandi filmed the video with a broken right leg after it was crushed between two cars shortly before filming began.

== Track listings ==
- US and Canadian maxi-CD single
1. "Don't Think I'm Not" (radio edit) – 3:50
2. "Don't Think I'm Not" (LP version) – 4:04
3. "Don't Think I'm Not" (hip hop remix) – 4:27
4. "Don't Think I'm Not" (Ear Kandi Remix) – 4:02
5. "Don't Think I'm Not" (LP instrumental) – 4:04
- US 12-inch single

A1. "Don't Think I'm Not" (radio edit) – 3:50
A2. "Don't Think I'm Not" (LP version) – 4:04
A3. "Don't Think I'm Not" (hip hop remix) – 4:27
B1. "Don't Think I'm Not" (Ear Kandi Remix) – 4:02
B2. "Don't Think I'm Not" (LP instrumental) – 4:04
B3. "Don't Think I'm Not" (LP a cappella) – 3:24

- UK CD single
1. "Don't Think I'm Not" (radio edit) – 3:50
2. "Don't Think I'm Not" (hip hop remix) – 4:27
3. "Don't Think I'm Not" (Soul Instep mix) – 4:57
4. "Don't Think I'm Not" (Maurice's radio mix) – 3:53
- UK cassette single
1. "Don't Think I'm Not" (radio edit) – 3:50
2. "Don't Think I'm Not" (Maurice's Remixing mix) – 7:53
3. "Don't Think I'm Not" (Digital Black & Groove club mix) – 7:14
- European CD single
1. "Don't Think I'm Not" (LP version) – 4:04
2. "Can't Come Back" (LP version) – 4:03
- European maxi-CD single
1. "Don't Think I'm Not" (LP version) – 4:04
2. "Can't Come Back" (LP version) – 4:03
3. "Don't Think I'm Not" (radio edit) – 3:50
4. "Don't Think I'm Not" (Ear Kandi remix) – 4:02
- Australian CD single
1. "Don't Think I'm Not" (radio edit) – 3:50
2. "Don't Think I'm Not" (LP version) – 4:04
3. "Don't Think I'm Not" (hip hop remix) – 4:27
4. "Don't Think I'm Not" (Ear Kandi remix) – 4:02
5. "What I'm Gon' Do to You" (LP version) – 3:50

== Credits and personnel ==
Credits are lifted from the US maxi-CD single liner notes.

Studios

- Recorded at Triangle Sound Studios (Atlanta, Georgia)
- Mixed at Larrabee North (North Hollywood, California)

Personnel

- Kevin "She'kspere" Briggs – writing, MIDI and sound, production, recording
- Kandi Burruss – writing, vocals, background vocals, production, vocal production
- Katrina Willis – writing, background vocals, vocal production
- Bernard Edwards Jr. – writing, MIDI and sound (as Focus)
- Brian Smith – recording
- Kevin "KD" Davis – mixing

== Charts ==
=== Weekly charts ===
Chart (2000–2001)	Peak position
Australia (ARIA)	16
Australian Urban (ARIA)	4
Canada (Nielsen SoundScan)	17
Europe (Eurochart Hot 100)	43
Germany (GfK)	86
Ireland (IRMA)	40
Netherlands (Dutch Top 40)	15
Netherlands (Single Top 100)	22
New Zealand (Recorded Music NZ)	7
Scottish Singles Sales (Official Charts)	31
UK Singles (Official Charts)	9
UK Hip Hop/R&B (Official Charts)	2
US Billboard Hot 100	24
US Hot R&B/Hip-Hop Songs (Billboard)	32
US Pop Airplay (Billboard)	12
US Rhythmic Airplay (Billboard)	4

=== Year-end charts ===
Chart (2000)	Position
UK Singles (OCC)	131
US Billboard Hot 100	86
US Mainstream Top 40 (Billboard)	80
US Rhythmic Top 40 (Billboard)	20

Chart (2001)	Position
Australia (ARIA)	97
US Mainstream Top 40 (Billboard)	74

== Certifications ==
Region	Certification	Certified units/sales
Australia (ARIA)	Gold	35,000^{^}
New Zealand (RMNZ)	Gold	5,000^{*}
United Kingdom (BPI)	Silver	200,000^{‡}
^{*} Sales figures based on certification alone.^{^} Shipments figures based on certification alone.^{‡} Sales+streaming figures based on certification alone.

== Release history ==
Region	Date	Format(s)	Label(s)	Ref(s).
United States	July 11, 2000	Urban radio	Columbia	
United States	July 18, 2000	Rhythmic contemporary radio	Columbia	
United States	August 15, 2000	Contemporary hit radio	Columbia	
United States	August 18, 2000	12-inch vinyl; CD	Columbia	
New Zealand	September 25, 2000	CD; cassette	Columbia	
United Kingdom	October 30, 2000	CD	Columbia	
