= Stacy-Deanne =

American author (born 1978)

- Born: Stacy Deanne Reed; February 5, 1978 (age 48); Houston, Texas
- Occupations: author, editor
- Notable work: novels: "Everlasting", "Melody"
- Awards: two YGA Literary Awards

Stacy-Deanne(Dee-Anne) (born Stacy Deanne Reed on February 5, 1978) is an American author.

== Early life ==
Stacy-Deanne (pronounced Dee-Anne) was born Stacy Deanne Reed on February 5, 1978 in Houston, Texas. She is an African-American novelist. She writes mainstream fiction including mysteries, thrillers and suspense novels. She is best known for her novels "Everlasting" (2007) and "Melody" (2008) published by Simon and Schuster. Stacy is also a certified editor.

Stacy is the daughter of John and Elva Reed. John is a retired Inspector who worked for Harris County for over thirty years. Elva was a school teacher who worked in the Houston Independent School District for over thirty years. She died from Leukemia at MD Anderson Cancer Hospital in December 2006.

Stacy was born an only child. Due to her not having any siblings Stacy relied on her imagination which ultimately got her interested in writing fiction years later. She attended Hobby Elementary School, Lanier Middle School and Jefferson Davis High School, all in Houston, Texas. Even though Stacy showed a talent for writing in middle school, it was not until she was nineteen that she decided to write professionally.

Stacy grew up with a lack of self-esteem and ongoing depression. Stacy is a writer's activist who helps steer aspiring writers to publication by sharing advice and by writing articles, sharing writing tips and guidance within the literary community.

== Career ==
Stacy-Deanne began writing professionally at nineteen years old. Stacy gained popularity with the release of her first book, "Alicia Keys, Ashanti, Beyonce, Destiny's Child, Jennifer Lopez & Mýa: Divas of the New Millennium", featuring the works of other authors. The 2005 book, showcased the ups and downs of some of music's brightest female stars. The book was published by Amber Communications Group, Inc. the top African-American publishing company for self-help and biography books. The book appeared on best selling lists for urban books including the Disilgold Soul Best Seller list and the YGA Best Selling List. The book garnered an award for, "Best Biography Book" for Disilgold Soul Awards.

Following the success of "Divas of the New Millennium", Stacy was profiled alongside other notable authors in the 2006 book "Literary Divas: The Top 100+ Most Admired African-American Women in Writing".

In 2007, Stacy released her novel, "Everlasting" published by Simon and Schuster's imprint, Strebor Books. The book, which focuses on a romance between Latino teens is noted as the Romeo and Juliet for today's generation and has become a favorite with readers from all walks of life. In June 2008 Stacy released her third book, "Melody" also with Simon and Schuster. The book is Stacy's first thriller and mystery work.

== Awards ==
In 2007, Stacy won two YGA Literary Awards for "Most Anticipated Author of the Year" and "Most Anticipated Latin Romance Novelist".
