= Daydreamin' (Before Dark album) =

Studio album by Before Dark
- Released: July 11, 2000
- Recorded: 1998–1999
- Genre: Hip hop, R&B
- Length: 54:14
- Label: RCA
- Producer: Christopher "Tricky" Stewart, Marc Kinchen, Roderick Wiggins, The Characters, Darryl McClary & Mike Allen, Derrick Edmondson, Sherree Ford-Payne

Professional ratings
Review scores
Source	Rating
Allmusic	2.5/5 stars

Daydreamin' is the only album released by R&B group, Before Dark. It was released on July 11, 2000 through RCA Records, about a year after it was originally set to be released. The group's first two singles, "Come Correct" and "Baby" were released in 1998 and 1999 respectively, but neither was met with much success and RCA decided to delay the album. Early in 2000 the group's third and most successful single "Monica" was released and peaked at 77 on the Billboard 200 and 7 on the Billboard Hot 100. Three months after the release of "Monica", Daydreamin' was finally released.

== Track listing ==
1. "Intro: Going to the Movies" (Gregory Curtis, Michelle LeFleur, Theodore Lefleur, Alvin Lefleur, Simon Lefleur) - 2:06
2. "How Could You" (Kevin Briggs, Kandi) - 2:48
3. "Monica" (Marc Kinchen, Lil' Mo, Carlos McKinney, Washington) - 4:04
4. "As Far as They Know" (Briggs, Kandi) - 3:35
5. "Baby" (Kevin Briggs, Chris Stewart, Tab, Turman) - 3:47 (Featuring Solé)
6. "Always on My Mind" (Mike Allen, Alvaughn Jackson, Darryl McClary) - 4:28
7. "It's All About You" (Stewart, Tab, Turman) - 4:25
8. "Interlude: In the Bathroom/Given So Much" (Curtis, LeFleur) - 1:39
9. "Come Correct" (Johnta Austin, Charles Farrar, Troy Taylor) - 4:17
10. "Tough Love" (LeFleur, Curtis, LeFleur, LeFleur) - 3:56
11. "Daydream" (Curtis) - 3:58
12. "She (Could Never Be Me)" (Derrick Edmondson, Sherree Ford-Payne) - 5:21
13. "Push N Shove" (Lyndon Roach, Roderick Wiggins, Wilkins) - 4:36
14. "Back Around" (Stewart, Tab) - 3:35
15. "Outro: Leaving the Movies" (Curtis, LeFleur, Lefleur, Lefleur, Lefleur) - 1:39

== Personnel ==
- Mike "Suga" Allen – producer
- Mike Allen – producer
- Before Dark – vocals, backing vocals
- Craig Burbidge – engineer
- Greg Curtis – arranger, producer, mixing, vocal producer, instrumentation
- Kevin "KD" Davis – engineer, mixing
- Tony Dawsey – mastering
- Derrick Edmondson – keyboards, programming, multi instruments, producer, engineer
- Charles Farrar – producer
- Flavahood – programming, multi instruments, drum programming, instrumentation
- Sherree Ford-Payne – producer, vocal arrangement, vocal producer
- John Fry – engineer
- Ben Garrison – mixing
- Andy Haller – engineer
- Alvaughn Jackson – vocal producer
- Kandi – vocal producer, instrumentation
- Marc Kinchen – producer
- Michelle LeFleur – executive producer, management
- Steve Macauley – mixing
- Majesty – bass, drum programming
- Bill Malina – digital editing, editing
- Darryl McClary – producer
- Carlos McKinney – producer
- Pat Miaba – backing vocals
- Mr. Roach – vocal producer
- Anthony Morgan – executive producer, A&R
- Eliud "Lou" Ortiz – mixing
- Tamara Spinner – A&R Coordinator
- Chris "Tricky" Stewart – keyboards, programming, producer, engineer, sequencing
- Troy Taylor – programming, multi instruments, producer, rhythm arrangements, vocal producer, instrumentation
- Kevin Thomas – engineer
- Josh Turner – engineer
- Tye-V – vocal producer
- Roderick Wiggins – producer
