= Cha Cha (rapper) =

American rapper

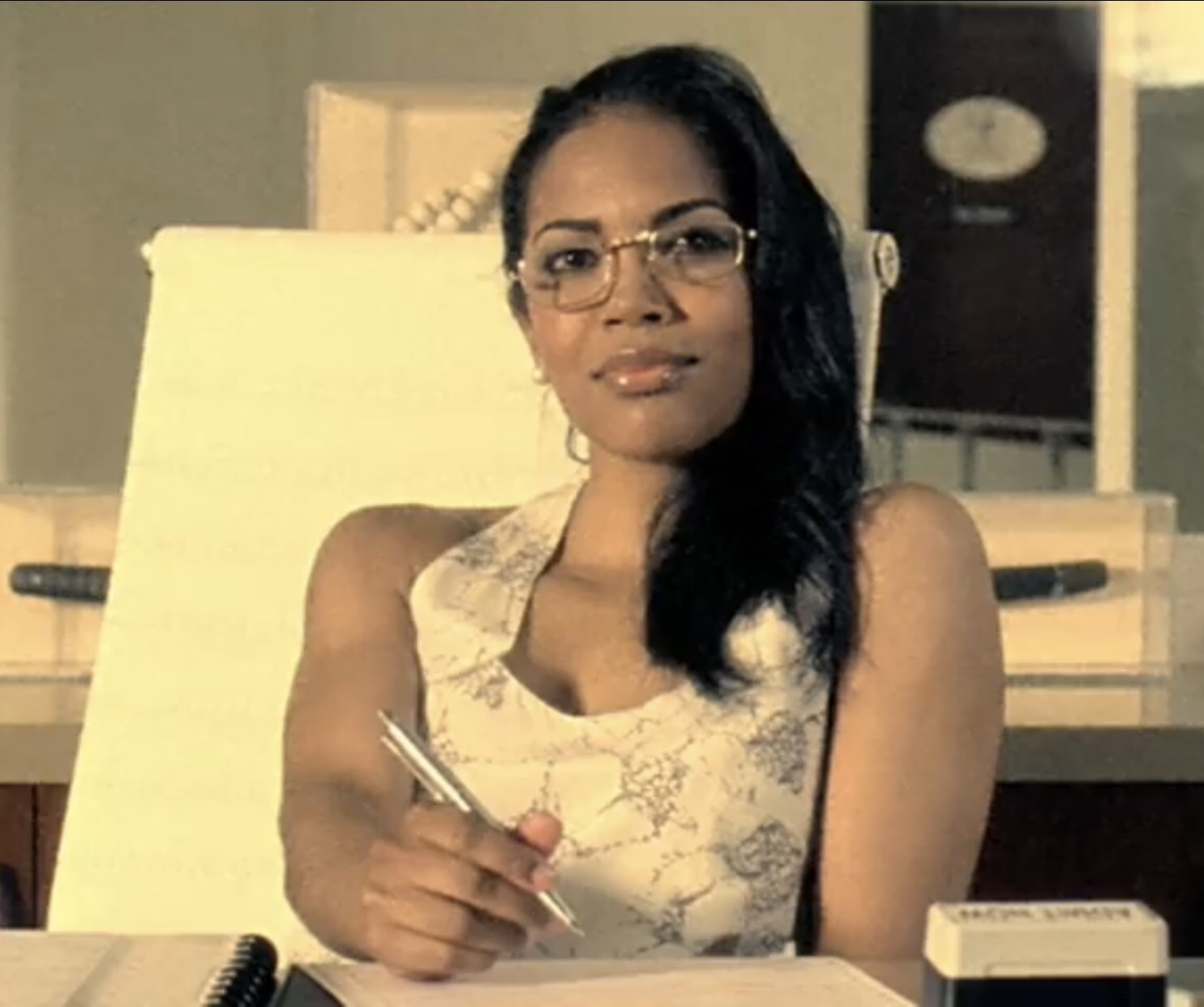
- Cha Cha in 2010

Background information
- Also known as: Parris Franz
- Born: Parris Ly'nell Fluellen; February 12, 1980 (age 46); Detroit, Michigan, U.S.
- Genres: Hip hop
- Occupations: Rapper, actress
- Years active: 1998–present
- Label: Epic

Parris Ly'nell Fluellen (born February 12, 1980), better known as Cha Cha or Parris Franz, is an American rapper, songwriter, and actress. She is known for her contributions to hip-hop in the late 1990s, and her subsequent transition into acting.

== Early life and education ==
Cha Cha was born on February 12, 1980 and raised in Detroit, Michigan. She attended Cass Technical High School and took acting classes at Michigan State University. She is currently a student at the Ivana Chubbuck Studio in Los Angeles.

== Music career ==
Cha Cha signed a recording contract with Epic after guest appearances on the Hav Plenty soundtrack, Shae Jones' Talk Show, and Tash's Rap Life. Her debut album, Dear Diary, was released on September 14, 1999, and featured collaborations with artists such as Nas and Juvenile. The album's single, "New Millenium (What Cha Wanna Do)," reached #28 on Rap.

After Dear Diary, Cha Cha contributed to several projects by rapper Royce da 5'9", including his mixtapes Build and Destroy and M.I.C. (Make It Count), and his second studio album, Death Is Certain.

== Acting career ==
Cha Cha transitioned into acting, with roles in films and television. Her film credits include:

- Office Outbreak (2006) as Sasha
- Stomp The Yard: Homecoming (2010) as a dancer
- A Day of Trouble (2018) as Jennifer
- Chocolate City (2015) as a club patron
- Entourage (2015) as a rave promoter

She appeared on MTV's The Lyricist Lounge Show and in shows like Meet the Browns (2010), Let's Stay Together (2012), and A Cross to Bear (2015). Cha Cha also worked as an on-air personality for Clear Channel and Radio One.

In theater, she starred in productions such as Soul Kittens Cabaret and A.I.M.: Angry Insecure Men, reprising her role as Mari Rodriguez in the play's film adaptation. Other performances include My Brother Marvin: The Marvin Gaye Story and Afeni Shakur: In Her Defense, a play about Tupac Shakur's mother.

== Discography ==
=== Albums ===
Year	Title	Chart positions
Year	Title	U.S. R&B
1999	==== Dear Diary ==== : Released: September 14, 1999; Label: Epic	86

=== Singles ===
Year	Single	Chart positions		Album
Year	Single	Rap	US	Album
1999	"New Millenium (What Cha Wanna Do)"	28	—	Dear Diary
1999	"He Likes" (featuring Jagged Edge)	—	—	Dear Diary
2001	"Stick 'Em"	—	—	What's the Worst That Could Happen?

== Filmography ==
=== Film ===
Year	Title	Role	Notes
2006	Office Outbreak	Sasha	
2010	Stomp The Yard 2: Homecoming	Dancer	
2014	A.I.M: Angry Insecure Men	Mari Rodriguez	
2015	Chocolate City	Club Patron	
2015	Entourage	Rave Promoter	
2018	A Day Of Trouble	Jennifer	

=== Short film ===
Year	Title	Role
2010	This Time	Ta'sia
2018	Surprise!	Jaz Allen

=== Television ===
Year	Title	Role	Notes
2000	The Lyricist Lounge Show	Customer	
2010	Meet the Browns	Patient	Episode: "Meet the Harassment"
2010	Christmas Cupid		
2012	Let's Stay Together	Waitress	Episode: "Leave Me Alone"
2015	A Cross to Bear	Tasha	
