= Kandi Koated =

Studio album by Kandi Burruss
- Released: December 14, 2010
- Recorded: 2008–2010
- Genre: R&B
- Length: 52:59
- Label: Kandi Koated Entertainment; Asylum Records
- Producer: Jazze Pha; Ne-Yo; Bryan-Michael Cox; Drumma Boy; Nitti; Malay; Blac Elvis; Kuya Productions

Kandi Burruss chronology
Fly Above EP (2009)	Kandi Koated (2010)

Singles from Kandi Koated
- 1. "I Fly Above" Released: October 22, 2009; 2. "Leave U" Released: October 14, 2010; 3. "Haven't Loved Right" Released: December 19, 2010

Kandi Koated is the second studio album by American R&B recording artist Kandi Burruss, released on December 14, 2010 in the United States on her independent label Kandi Koated Entertainment and Asylum Records. The album features production from Kandi amongst others including Jazze Pha, Ne-Yo, Bryan-Michael Cox, and Drumma Boy. Kandi promoted the album with her debut EP, Fly Above EP, released on October 29, 2009. The first single "Leave U" has reached number 89 on the Billboard Hot R&B/Hip-Hop Songs chart. The U.S. iTunes Store had a deluxe edition available for pre-order with 3 bonus tracks.

== Background ==
In 2006, Kandi confirmed that she was working on her next album, which was originally set to be released that same year. Then, a promo single, "I Need", was released on December 19, 2006 for her second album. After the promo single failed to garner any success or attention, the album was put on hold indefinitely.

In 2008, Kandi began work on her second album. The album had several release dates in 2009; July, August, September, and November. The Fly Above EP was released on October 29, 2009, coinciding with the release of the album. It was used to promote the album and the lead single "Fly Above". Kandi made the decision to delay her second album into 2010 because she wanted to continue to record, but the main reason for the delay was because Capitol Records hadn't signed her. The deal later fell through. Kandi also wanted to be able to promote her debut EP separately from her album.

== Releases and promotion ==
The track "Fly Above" was used as a single from her Fly Above EP.

Prior to the album's earliest release date, the album's intro track as well as the songs "Me & U", "I Want You", "I Just Know" (which was on her "Fly Above EP"), and "How Could You..Feel My Pain" premiered separately, one song at a time, each day starting from November 1, 2010 until November 28, 2010. The full album was later released on Kandi's website.

Kandi toured with R&B singer Eric Benét for Fantasia's Back to Me tour.

=== Singles ===
- A buzz single, "Fly Above", was released on October 6, 2009. The record was originally intended to be released as the album's lead single but was only used to support the EP Fly Above EP.
- Confirmed as the first single from the album, "Leave U" was produced by Jazze Pha. The song was released as a digital download on October 5, 2010. It was officially released to urban and rhythmic radio formats in October 2010. The song as recently debut at number 89 on the Billboard's Hot R&B/Hip-Hop Songs chart.
- "Haven't Loved Right" was released as a music video on Bravotv.com
- As previewed on "The Real Housewives of Atlanta", Kandi premieres her new video for her new single, "How Could You...Feel My Pain". The video also features Kandi's well known friends, Tameka "Tiny" Cottle and rapper, Rasheeda.

== Reception ==
=== Commercial performance ===
The album debuted at number ninety one on the US Billboard 200 chart, with first-week sales of 18,000 copies.

=== Critical response ===
Professional ratings
Review scores
Source	Rating
Allmusic	4/5 stars
USA Today	3/4 stars
"NY Times"	Favorable
People Magazine	3/4 stars

Kandi Koated was well received by music critics upon its release. Allmusic writer Andy Kellman gave it 4 out of 5 stars and found Burruss to be "in fine form, either writing or co-writing each song, and she sounds more confident vocally than ever, with her material switching easily between heartache, desire, and self-empowerment". Steve Jones of USA Today gave the album 3 out of 4 stars and commented that it "proves that she's still got it as a vocal powerhouse and potent songwriter". The Ny Times review stated " her voice deserved a showcase like "Kandi Koated." The music is accomplished neo-soul, with programmed drumbeats and electronic keyboards filled out by string orchestrations and Kandi’s overdubbed vocal harmonies. It makes room for her to build narratives like an old-school soul singer."

== Track listing ==
No.	Title	Writer(s)	Producer(s)	Length
1.	"Kandi Koated" (Intro)	Tim Walls; Kandi Burruss	Tim "Krazy Figz" Walls	1:35
2.	"I Want You"	Erik "Rook" Ortiz; Burruss; Kevin "Colione" Crowe; Kenny "Barto" Bartolomei	J.U.S.T.I.C.E. League	4:35
3.	"The More I Try"	Kawan "KP" Prather; B. Ellis; James R. Ho; Burruss	K.P. & Malay	4:21
4.	"Give It to You"	Bryan-Michael Cox; Burruss	Cox	5:07
5.	"I Just Know"	Sammy Blues; Burruss; Bobby Brass	Kuya Productions	4:14
6.	"Me & U"	Ryghteous Ryan Tedder; Burruss; Rico Wade; Ray Murray; André Benjamin; Jerrol "Boogie" Wizzard; Patrick "Sleepy" Brown; Shaffer Smith; Antwan Patton; Geno Regist	Jerrol "Boogie" Wizzard; Tedder; Geno Regist	4:11
7.	"Lucky" (Interlude)	Jessyca Wilson; Elvis Williams; Burruss	Blac Elvis	1:54
8.	"Lucky"	Wilson; Prather; Bryan Ellis; Ho; Burruss	K.P. & Malay	3:36
9.	"How Could You… Feel My Pain"	Todd Moore; Burruss	LT-MOE	3:27
10.	"Leave U"	Phalon Alexander; Burruss	Jazze Pha	4:02
11.	"Haven’t Loved Right"	Ellis; Prather; Ho; M. Coleman; Burruss	K.P. & Malay	4:07
12.	"Riley's" (Interlude)	Burruss		0:37
13.	"Leroy Jones"	Williams; Burruss	Blac Elvis	3:42
14.	"Superwoman" (featuring Tameka "Tiny" Cottle)	Tameka Cottle; Taylor Johnson; Burruss	Proper-T Productions^{[a]}	3:44
15.	"Fly Above"	Christopher Gholson; Burruss	Drumma Boy	3:52

iTunes deluxe edition bonus track(s)
No.	Title	Writer(s)	Length
16.	"Let's Get It"	Burruss	3:45
17.	"Go On Without You"	Larry Troutman; Roger Troutman	4:13
18.	"I'm Happy"	Burruss	4:10

Notes

- ^{^[a]} denotes co-producer
- "Let's Get It" is track 9 on the track list of the deluxe edition.
- "I'm Happy", is track 14 on track list of the deluxe edition.
- "Go On Without You", a Shirley Murdock cover, is track 13 on the track list of the deluxe edition.

== Charts ==
=== Weekly charts ===
Chart (2010)	Peak position
US Billboard 200	91
US Top R&B/Hip-Hop Albums (Billboard)	17

=== Year-end charts ===
Chart (2011)	Position
US Top R&B/Hip-Hop Albums (Billboard)	80
