= Bait (2000 film) =

American-Canadian action comedy film

- Theatrical release poster
- Directed by: Antoine Fuqua
- Written by: Andrew Scheinman; Adam Scheinman; Tony Gilroy
- Produced by: Sean Ryerson
- Starring: Jamie Foxx; David Morse; Doug Hutchison; Kimberly Elise; David Paymer; Mike Epps; Robert Pastorelli; Jamie Kennedy
- Cinematography: Tobias A. Schliessler
- Edited by: Alan Edward Bell
- Music by: Mark Mancina
- Production company: Castle Rock Entertainment
- Distributed by: Warner Bros. Pictures
- Release date: September 15, 2000
- Running time: 119 minutes
- Country: United States
- Language: English
- Budget: $51 million
- Box office: $15.5 million

Bait is a 2000 American action comedy film starring Jamie Foxx and David Morse. It was directed by Antoine Fuqua. In the film, a petty thief shares a prison cell with a man who stole millions in gold from the Federal Reserve. The robber dies of natural causes, leaving behind a cryptic message concerning the location of his loot. The authorities decide to release his cellmate, to use him as bait against the deceased's dangerous former partner.

The film was released on September 15, 2000. It received generally negative reviews from critics and was a huge financial failure for Warner Bros. Pictures, grossing just $15 million against its $51 million budget.

== Plot ==
When fast-talking, petty thief and hustler Alvin Sanders gets arrested for stealing prawns, the worst of his problems would seem to be going to jail. Unfortunately, he ends up sharing a cell with John Delano Jaster, who, while stealing $42 million in gold from the Federal Reserve Bank of New York, double-crossed his partner, Bristol, after Bristol murdered two bound and gagged guards during the gold heist. Bristol, who is the mastermind of the heist, is shown to be a dangerous man, with a knack for computers, a long memory, and who will go to any lengths to find where Jaster hid the gold, including killing others. While being interrogated by hardball Treasury Agent Edgar Clenteen, the double-crosser dies from heart failure.

All the feds have are an incomprehensible message that Jaster gave to Alvin to deliver to his wife, who is dead unbeknownst to him, having been killed by Bristol ("Tell her she should go to the Bronx Zoo. Tell her 'There's no place like home'."), so they decide to release him and use him as bait to catch Bristol by secretly implanting a combination tracking device and electronic bug into Alvin's jaw. From that moment on, a surveillance team can follow Alvin's every move and hear his every word. Unfortunately, Alvin has a talent for getting into trouble, especially with his criminal younger brother Stevie – which means that the feds have to become his guardian angels so that he can serve his purpose. Sure enough, Bristol is hot on Alvin's trail, using his computer expertise to discover that Alvin was jailed alongside Jaster and managing to gain more information from him through a phony telephone call.

Alvin soon becomes suspicious of the many situations that have occurred since he has been released from prison, especially when he encounters Bristol face to face, yet eventually Bristol kidnaps Alvin while evading the authorities, causing an explosion from a bomb attached to a bound and gagged agent Wooly. After interrogating Alvin, Bristol forces Alvin to lead him to the gold supposedly hidden at the horse track in Manhattan, while holding his girlfriend Lisa and baby hostage. Alvin manages to eventually escape and fight off Bristol and free Lisa before a bomb set in the van they're in explodes. Alvin manages to hot wire the van, drive it and jump out just in time before the bomb explodes. Bristol catches up to Alvin and points a gun at him, yet Clenteen shoots him multiple times, saving Alvin. A grateful Alvin punches Clenteen due to earlier treatment while in jail, yet Clenteen, not upset by it, admits he had it coming.

While discussing with Lisa concerning their son Gregory at her bookstore, Alvin meets a customer asking for the book The Bronx Zoo, which leads him to understand Jaster's message: the gold is buried under "home" plate at Yankee Stadium. He then calls Clenteen to discuss a reward for the recovery of the stolen gold, which after some confusion turns out to be five percent of its value – $2 million.

== Cast ==
- Jamie Foxx as Alvin Dean Sanders
- David Morse as Treasury Agent Edgar Clenteen
- Doug Hutchison as Bristol
- Kimberly Elise as Lisa Hill
- David Paymer as Treasury Agent Wooly
- Mike Epps as Stevie Sanders
- Robert Pastorelli as John Delano Jaster
- Jamie Kennedy as Treasury Agent Blum
- Nestor Serrano as Treasury Agent Boyle
- Megan Dodds as Treasury Agent Walsh
- Neil Crone as Supervisor
- Kirk Acevedo as Ramundo
- Larry Block as Customer
- Jeffrey Donovan as Julio
- Tia Texada as Tika

== Production ==
In May 1999, it was announced Jamie Foxx would star in the action-comedy Bait under the direction of Stephen Surjik who was eventually replaced by Antoine Fuqua. The film was co-produced by Castle Rock Entertainment with Warner Bros. Pictures distributing. Prior to casting David Morse as Edgar Clenteen, the role had originally been slated to be played by Kris Kristofferson. It was filmed in Ontario, Canada.

== Reception ==
=== Critical response ===
On Rotten Tomatoes, the film has an approval rating of 26% based on reviews from 81 critics, with an average rating of 4.5/10. The website's consensus reads, "Even though Jamie Foxx shines in Bait, the movie suffers from music video roots and a formulaic script that strains credibility." On Metacritic, it has a weighted average score of 39 out of 100 based on 28 critics, indicating "generally unfavorable reviews". Audiences polled by CinemaScore gave the film an average grade of "A−" on an A+ to F scale.

Roger Ebert gave it 3 out of 4 stars and wrote that "it's over the top, an exercise in action comedy that cuts loose from logic and enjoys itself."

In 2007, director Antoine Fuqua said: "Bait was one of those movies that's not me. As a director in the beginning you're still trying to find what your passion is. You don't always necessarily get to do what you're passionate about, and I was always impatient with waiting around. It wasn't like the stuff I was passionate about was coming across my desk, and it was a chance to work with Jamie. And I thought, well, maybe I do have a little bit of humor in me. But I don't! It didn't work out for me."

=== Box office ===
The film opened at #2 at the North American box office making $5,485,591 USD in its opening weekend, behind The Watcher. Bait ultimately failed to bring back its $51 million budget, as it grossed only $15 million worldwide.

== Soundtrack ==
A soundtrack was released on September 12, 2000, by Warner Bros. Records featuring rap and R&B music from artists such as Mya, Donell Jones, Cuban Link, The Roots and many other artists. The soundtrack reached No. 49 on the Top R&B/Hip-Hop Albums.
