= Before Dark =

American R&B girl group

- Arike, Jeni G. and Mia

Background information
- Origin: Los Angeles, California, USA
- Genres: R&B
- Years active: 1998–2001
- Labels: RCA
- Members: Arike Rice; Mia Wright; Jeni G.

Before Dark was an American R&B girl group that originated in the late 1990s. The group consisted of sisters Arike Rice and Jeni Rice Genzuk (AKA Jeni G.), and their friend Mia Wright (née Lee), all from South Central Los Angeles. The group released the album Daydreamin' on July 11, 2000, on the RCA Records label with a single called "Baby" featuring rapper Solé. They also made a guest appearance on Tyrese's self-titled debut album. Later in 2000, the single "Monica" hit #77 on the Billboard Top 100 chart and #7 on the Billboard R&B sales chart. The group disbanded in 2001.

Arike Rice was formerly a member of the 90's group Voices when she was nine. She also appeared in the musical films Dreamgirls, as a member of 'The Stepp Sisters', and Hairspray, as a member of "The Dynamites" in 2006 and 2007 respectively. Mia Lee married basketball player Dorell Wright in 2014. Lastly, Jeni G. became a writer and supervising producer for The CW/Black Entertainment Television series The Game, which starred her sister Arike's former Voices singing member Tia Mowry. She is currently a writer and a supervising producer of the American Broadcasting Company series Black-ish, for which she was nominated for an Emmy Award in 2016.

== Discography ==
=== Album ===
- 2000: Daydreamin'

=== Singles ===
Year	Song	Chart positions		
Year	Song	US Hot 100	US R&B	US Rhythmic
1999	"Come Correct"	—	93	—
1999	"Baby"	—	48	—
2000	"Monica"	77	7	2
