= The Platinum's on the Wall =

Video by Destiny's Child
- Released: March 6, 2001
- Recorded: 1997–2001
- Length: 25 minutes
- Language: English
- Label: Columbia
- Director: Darren Grant; Dwayne Coles; Troy Smith; Joseph Kahn
- Producer: Deana Concilio; Jason Bau

Destiny's Child chronology
The Writing's on the Wall (1999)	The Platinum's on the Wall (2001)	Survivor (2001)

The Platinum's on the Wall is the first video album by American girl group Destiny's Child. It was released on March 6, 2001, by Columbia Records.

The Platinum's on the Wall comprises accompanying music videos for six singles from Destiny's Child's first two studio albums–Destiny's Child (1998) and The Writing's on the Wall (1999). A moderate commercial success, it peaked at number 17 on the US Top Music Videos and was certified gold by the Recording Industry Association of America (RIAA).

== Track listing ==
The Platinum's on the Wall – North American edition
No.	Title	Director(s)	Length
1.	"No, No, No Part 1"	Darren Grant
2.	"No, No, No Part 2" (featuring Wyclef Jean)	Grant
3.	"Bills, Bills, Bills"	Grant
4.	"Bug a Boo"	Grant
5.	"Say My Name"	Joseph Kahn
6.	"Jumpin', Jumpin'" (So So Def Remix) (featuring Jermaine Dupri, Da Brat and Lil' Bow Wow)	Kahn

The Platinum's on the Wall – International edition (bonus video)
No.	Title	Length
7.	"Independent Women Part I" (live at The Brits 2001)

== Charts ==
Weekly chart performance for The Platinum's on the Wall
Chart (2001–2003)	Peak position
Australian Music DVD (ARIA)	11
Australian Music Videos (ARIA)	9
UK Music Videos (OCC)	7
US Top Music Videos (Billboard)	17

== Certifications ==
Certifications and sales for The Platinum's on the Wall
Region	Certification	Certified units/sales
United States (RIAA)	Gold	50,000^{^}
^{^} Shipments figures based on certification alone.

== Release history ==
Release dates and formats for The Platinum's on the Wall
Region	Date	Format(s)	Label(s)	Ref.
United States	March 6, 2001	DVD	Columbia	
United Kingdom	May 11, 2001	DVD	Columbia	
Japan	May 30, 2001	DVD	Sony Music Japan	
Australia	July 16, 2001	DVD	Sony Music	
