= The Writing's on the Wall =

- Standard cover (Note: Japanese edition and European reissue covers feature blue backgrounds.)

Studio album by Destiny's Child
- Released: July 14, 1999
- Recorded: October 1998 – April 1999
- Studios: 24/7 (Houston); 353 (New York); Dallas Sound Lab (Dallas); DARP (Atlanta); Digital (Houston); Digital Services (Houston); Digital Sound (Houston); Doppler (Atlanta); Electric Lady (New York); The Enterprise (Los Angeles); The Hit Factory (New York); House of Music (Oakland); Live Oak (Berkeley); Madhouse (Los Angeles); Pacifique (Los Angeles); Silent Sound (Atlanta); SugarHill (Houston); Triangle Sound (Atlanta)
- Genres: R&B; pop; hip hop; soul
- Length: 64:52
- Label: Columbia
- Producers: Jovonn Alexander; Kevin "She'kspere" Briggs; Donnie "D-Major" Boynton; Chad "Dr. Ceuss" Elliott; Missy Elliott; Ken "K-Fam" Fambro; Anthony Hardy; Donald Holmes; Oshea Hunter; Rodney Jerkins; Beyoncé Knowles; Platinum Status; Daryl Simmons; Chris Stokes; Terry T; Gerard Thomas; D'wayne Wiggins

Destiny's Child chronology
| Destiny's Child (1998) | The Writing's on the Wall (1999) | Survivor (2001) |

Singles from The Writing's on the Wall
- 1. "Bills, Bills, Bills" Released: May 31, 1999; 2. "Bug a Boo" Released: July 7, 1999; 3. "Say My Name" Released: October 14, 1999; 4. "Jumpin', Jumpin'" Released: July 17, 2000

The Writing's on the Wall is the second studio album by American girl group Destiny's Child. It was released on July 14, 1999, by Columbia Records. Dissatisfied with their 1998 eponymous debut studio album, Destiny's Child sought transition from the record's neo soul-influenced sound. Hence, the group took more creative control and enlisted an almost entirely different array of collaborators, including Kevin "She'kspere" Briggs, Kandi Burruss, Missy Elliott, Rodney Jerkins, and LaShawn Daniels, among others.

A result of the substantial artistic change, The Writing's on the Wall is an R&B, pop, hip hop, and soul record. Furthermore, it incorporates unconventional sonic elements, complex arrangements and staccato rap-singing vocals. Lyrically, the album is constructed as a concept album, with each track representing a Ten Commandments-inspired "Commandment of Relationships". Its themes include infatuation, dependency, infidelity, and separation, while a loose religious theme is maintained throughout. The production and innovative approach earned critical acclaim, while lyrical content initially elicited criticism. However, retrospective critical commentaries saw praise directed towards the album's feminist undertones.

The Writing's on the Wall is widely considered Destiny's Child's breakthrough album. It debuted at number six on the US Billboard 200, with first-week sales of 133,000 units, and later peaked at number five. The album went on to be certified octuple platinum by the Recording Industry Association of America (RIAA) for shipments of eight million units in the US. Four singles were produced—"Bills, Bills, Bills", "Bug a Boo", "Say My Name" and "Jumpin', Jumpin'". "Bills, Bills, Bills" and "Say My Name" became Destiny's Child's first two US Billboard Hot 100 number-ones, with the latter winning the group their first two Grammy Awards. With worldwide sales of 13 million copies, The Writing's on the Wall is one of the best selling albums by a girl group and best-selling R&B albums of all time.

The Writing's on the Wall was largely overshadowed by the controversy surrounding its promotional cycle as a result of the group's internal conflicts. The music video for "Say My Name" saw original members LeToya Luckett and LaTavia Roberson–who had attempted to split with their manager Mathew Knowles–unexpectedly replaced with Farrah Franklin and Michelle Williams. Luckett and Roberson filed a lawsuit against Knowles and former bandmates, and Franklin departed from Destiny's Child a mere five months after joining, leaving it as a trio. Regardless of the turmoil, many publications have listed the album among the best of its time and genre, noting the immense influence on numerous artists.

== Background and development ==
In 1995, Destiny was signed to Elektra Records by Sylvia Rhone. However, they were dismissed from the label eight months into their contract, without having even released an album, for being "too young and undeveloped". Changing their name to Destiny's Child, the group was signed to Columbia Records by Teresa LaBarbera Whites in 1996, after negotiations from Beyoncé's father Mathew Knowles, who became their manager. Destiny's Child made their recording debut with the inclusion of the track "Killing Time" on the Men in Black soundtrack in July 1997. Three months later, their debut single "No, No, No" was released, eventually going on to peak at number three on the US Billboard Hot 100 and atop the Hot R&B/Hip-Hop Songs. The neo soul and R&B-infused eponymous debut studio album followed in February 1998, to a mixed critical reception.

Commercially, Destiny's Child was a slow seller, peaking only at number 67 on the US Billboard 200, but managed to earn a platinum certification from the Recording Industry Association of America (RIAA) two years after its release. It produced one more single, "With Me", which failed to replicate the success of its predecessor. Beyoncé would retrospectively label the album "successful but not hugely successful", as it was "a neo-soul record and we were 15 years old. It was way too mature for us." In September, the group's contribution to the Why Do Fools Fall in Love soundtrack, "Get on the Bus"–a collaboration with Timbaland–was released to moderate commercial success. Around this time, Destiny's Child–partly dissatisfied with their debut–began conceiving ideas for its follow-up. As they were preparing to write and record new material, they sat together and listed what they liked and disliked about Destiny's Child in order to improve.

== Writing and recording ==
"With The Writing's on the Wall, we did the whole album in about three weeks. Sometimes we did two songs a day. Some songs might take two days but we're very, very quick in the studio."

— Beyoncé reflecting on the fast-paced recording process for The Writing's on the Wall.

The recording of The Writing's on the Wall commenced in October 1998. Beyoncé later recalled that Destiny's Child was not nervous about a sophomore slump and had many ideas for the album, as they were not entirely satisfied with their debut. The Writing's on the Wall saw group members take further creative control, as the members wrote more songs than on Destiny's Child, and would rewrite lyrics they received from collaborators to adjust them into suitable songs. Beyoncé co-wrote 11 out of 16 tracks, Kelly Rowland co-wrote ten, LeToya Luckett nine, and LaTavia Roberson eight. Beyoncé sought inspiration for her songwriting from the customers at her mother Tina Knowles' hair salon, namely their grievances and complaints over men, relationships, and financial hardships. She additionally produced four tracks from the album, while participating in vocal production and arrangement of several tracks as well. Whites suggested Destiny's Child to consult producer Kevin "She'kspere" Briggs. Upon arriving to Houston, where the majority of The Writing's on the Wall was recorded, Briggs and his then-girlfriend, singer-songwriter Kandi Burruss, were told there was space for only one more track on the album. However, after the pair presented "Bug a Boo", the group decided to structure the entire record around it. Briggs ended up producing four additional songs–"So Good", "Bills, Bills, Bills", "Hey Ladies" and "She Can't Love You"–co-writing them with Burruss. Burruss would reveal in 2011 that at the time of production, one of the group members was dating her former boyfriend on whom "Bills, Bills, Bills" was based. Being promoted to executive producer alongside Mathew Knowles, Briggs introduced skittering quadruple-time beats while encouraging stuttering vocal phrasing, both of which defined the sound of The Writing's on the Wall.

Rodney Jerkins produced "Say My Name", which was recorded at the Pacifique Recording Studios in North Hollywood, Los Angeles. He co-wrote it with his brother Fred Jerkins III, LaShawn Daniels, and the group members. Daniels, who helmed its vocal production, based the song on a relationship he had experienced, noting that Beyoncé was able to relate as she was also in a relationship at the time. However, the group rejected the song's original mix, and the track was almost left unused; Beyoncé later negatively described the original mix as a "jungle". Jerkins then introduced a new mix to Knowles, and the track was subsequently included on The Writing's on the Wall. According to Daniels, Destiny's Child equally contributed to the track, stating that their creative input would consistently increase throughout the production process. Missy Elliott wrote and produced "Confessions", on which she made a guest appearance; the track was recorded at The Hit Factory in New York and The Enterprise in Los Angeles. D'Wayne Wiggins produced and co-wrote "Temptations" and "Sweet Sixteen", which were both recorded at the Digital Sound in Houston and the House of Music in Oakland, California. "Stay" was solely written and produced by Daryl Simmons, being recorded at the Silent Sound Studios in Atlanta. Next were featured on "If You Leave", which was written by their member R.L. Huggar; it was co-written and produced by Chad Elliott, who also co-wrote and produced "Jumpin', Jumpin'". The former was recorded at Electric Lady Studios in New York and the Dallas Sound Lab, while the latter was recorded at the 353 Studio in New York and the 24/7 Studio in Atlanta. Meanwhile, Ken Fambro and Donnie Boynton co-wrote and produced "Now That She's Gone". By April 1999, The Writing's on the Wall had been completed.

== Music and lyrics ==
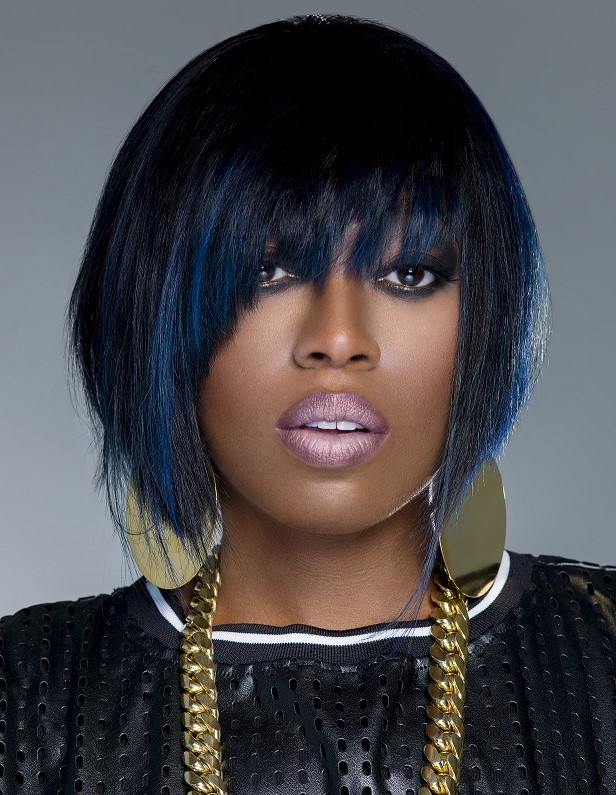
Missy Elliott (pictured) is featured on the 1970s-influenced "Confessions", which she wrote and produced.

The Writing's on the Wall is predominantly an R&B, pop, hip hop, and soul record. Its production incorporates sounds such as record scratches, bubbles, and breaking glass, while the instrumentation is based on sharp guitar riffs, complex percussion arrangements, and orchestral brass. Constructed as a concept album, each track on The Writing's on the Wall represents a Ten Commandments-inspired "Commandment of Relationships", which is stated at the end of each track in reference to the following one. Lyrically, the album has been described as having a "cynical, jaded, sometimes transactional" perception of love. It opens with a titular intro inspired by The Godfather scene in the 1996 film Set It Off, which sees Rowland, Luckett, and Roberson gathering to meet their "godfather" Beyoncé and to discuss their "Commandments of Relationships". As the members mention betrayal from different men, the tone for The Writing's on the Wall is immediately set as "a tale of empowerment and vengeance". The first commandment "Thou shalt not hate" announces "So Good", which sees the protagonist flaunting her success to a hateful and jealous former lover. Its instrumentation consists of sped-up acoustic guitar loops. "Jittery" R&B track "Bills, Bills, Bills" features instrumentation led by harpsichord-synthesizers. Lyrically, the song confronts a boyfriend for his lack of accountability over credit card and phone bill charges while following the "Thou shalt pay bills" commandment. Numerous critics drew parallels between the track and TLC's "No Scrubs", also written by Briggs and Burruss around the same time. Burruss revealed it was written based on her own personal experience with a former boyfriend, who was involved in a relationship with a Destiny's Child member at the time of the writing. The protagonist of the 1970s-influenced soul track "Confessions", featuring a spoken-word performance by Missy Elliott, admits to infidelity. "Bug a Boo" speaks against an overly attached boyfriend.

The "coy, pillowy" sixth track "Temptation" discusses abstinence from having sex with a virtual stranger while already being involved in a relationship. "Now That She's Gone" showcases a female protagonist's refusal to rekindle the relationship with a former boyfriend who has returned after abandoning another woman. "Where'd You Go" sees the group members pleading their partners to stay after noticing a loss of interest towards them. The upbeat "Hey Ladies" encourages women to take a stand against their deceitful boyfriends. The "late night" slow jam "If You Leave" is a collaboration with Next. Lyrically, the song centers around a couple debating over whether they should leave their respective partners and begin a relationship together. The uptempo dance-pop track "Jumpin', Jumpin'" encourages women to leave their partners at home in favor of going to a nightclub filled with rich men. "Say My Name", singled out by multiple publications as the album's highlight, reprises the "thick, paranoid mix" of Jerkins' prior production "The Boy Is Mine", the 1998 duet between Brandy and Monica. It rotates between different sonic elements, shifting from a "slow, sexy" bass to syncopated, synth-infused strings and record scratches. Lyrically, the song features a female protagonist suspecting her boyfriend of cheating. "She Can't Love You" is a guitar-driven Latin and bolero ballad. The ballad "Stay" discusses a relationship which is deteriorating due to the female protagonist not wanting to consummate it, much to her boyfriend's dissatisfaction. "Sweet Sixteen" lyrically follows a girl named Jackie, who is eager to grow up. The Writing's on the Wall closes with an a cappella cover of "Amazing Grace", which acts as the outro and is dedicated to the late Andretta Tilman, Destiny's Child's original manager.

== Marketing ==
=== Title and packaging ===
In a May 2000 interview for Jet, Rowland revealed that, while deliberating over the album's title, Destiny's Child was choosing between The Writing's on the Wall and another, undisclosed title. They consulted Wyclef Jean, who preferred the former, and advised the group to incorporate the narrative of the revelation of the Ten Commandments to Moses at Mount Sinai into their "Commandments of Relationships". Similarly, biographer Daryl Easlea noted the title was taken from the Book of Daniel from the Bible's Old Testament; in the book, supernatural writing foretold the demise of Babylonia.

In reference to the title, all 14 "Commandments of Relationships" displayed throughout The Writing's on the Wall are listed on the front of its CD copies. The cover artwork for the album was photographed by Hide Olda and depicts the members wearing white halter tops and facing directly into the camera. The light grey wall behind them features the group's name and the title written in a blurry manner, signifying "the writings on the wall". Jaelani Turner-Williams from Stereogum described the cover as "futuristic".

=== Release and promotion ===
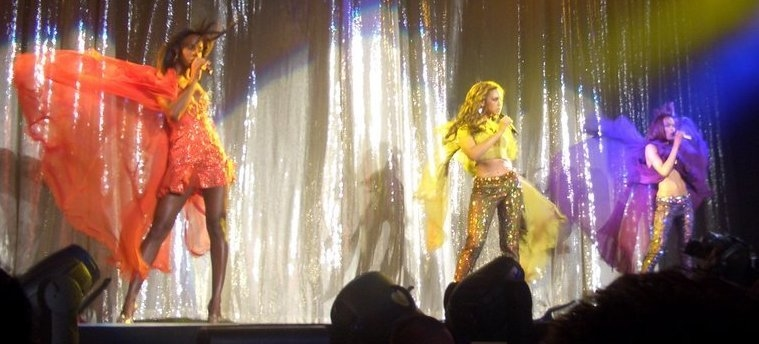
Destiny's Child performing "Say My Name" during their tour Destiny Fulfilled... and Lovin' It in May 2005

In the US, The Writing's on the Wall was released on July 27, 1999, by Columbia Records, having been released in Japan on July 14. Initial US pressings featured the music video for "No, No, No Part I" as an enhanced CD bonus feature, whereas international editions included "Get on the Bus" as a bonus track. To support The Writing's on the Wall, Destiny's Child embarked on TLC's FanMail Tour as an opening act during its October–December North American leg. Their televised performances at the Soul Train Lady of Soul Awards on September 3, 1999, the 2000 Soul Train Music Awards on March 4, 2000, during MTV Spring Break in Cancún on March 16, at the TMF Awards in Rotterdam on April 15, and on Britney Spears' free concert in Honolulu on April 24, further promoted the album. In July 2000, Destiny's Child joined Christina Aguilera as an opening act on her tour Christina Aguilera in Concert, touring North America until October. While on tour, the group performed a 45-minute set at The Big E on September 17, and performed "Say My Name" at the MuchMusic Video Awards on September 21.

In November 2000, The Writing's on the Wall was reissued in Europe, being packaged with a bonus disc including "Independent Women Part I". At the Billboard Music Awards on December 5, Destiny's Child performed a medley composed of "Independent Women Part I", "Say My Name", and "Jumpin', Jumpin'". They subsequently performed nominated songs "Independent Women Part I" and "Say My Name" at the 43rd Annual Grammy Awards on February 21, 2001, when they won their first two Grammy Awards, both for "Say My Name". In honor of the 20th anniversary of The Writing's on the Wall in July 2019, Sony Music launched "Destiny's Child 2019 Dating Commandments". Similar to Tinder, the interactive dating app modernized the 14 "Commandments of Relationships". Furthermore, The Writing's on the Wall was made available on a limited-edition vinyl exclusively at Urban Outfitters on November 1.

=== Singles ===
"Bills, Bills, Bills" was released as the lead single from The Writing's on the Wall on May 31, 1999. A commercial success, it became Destiny's Child's first US Billboard Hot 100 number-one single, also topping the US Hot R&B/Hip-Hop Songs for nine consecutive weeks. The single was certified platinum by the RIAA in July 2020, denoting sales of one million units in the US. Internationally, the song reached the top 10 in Belgium, Canada, Iceland, the Netherlands, and the UK. Critically acclaimed, it was nominated for Best R&B Performance by a Duo or Group with Vocals and Best R&B Song at the 42nd Annual Grammy Awards (2000). An accompanying music video was directed by Darren Grant and was a tribute to Destiny's Child's then-stylist Tina Knowles, as it depicts group members as hair salon employees frustrated with men. "Bug a Boo" was released as the second single from The Writing's on the Wall on July 7, 1999. It failed to replicate the commercial success of its predecessor, peaking only at number 33 on the US Billboard Hot 100 and number 15 on the US Hot R&B/Hip-Hop Songs. The song fared better internationally, peaking within the top 10 in the Netherlands and the UK. The Grant-directed accompanying music video shows the group members fleeing from aggravating boyfriends, and features cameo appearances from Kobe Bryant and Wyclef Jean.

"Say My Name" was released as the third single from The Writing's on the Wall on October 14, 1999. It became Destiny's Child's second US Billboard Hot 100 and third US Hot R&B/Hip-Hop Songs number-one single. The single was certified triple platinum by the RIAA in July 2020, denoting sales of three million units in the US. Internationally, the song reached the summit in Australia, and the top 10 in Belgium, Canada, France, Iceland, the Netherlands, New Zealand, Norway, Poland, and the UK. Critically acclaimed, it won the group's first two Grammy Awards–for Best R&B Performance by a Duo or Group with Vocals and Best R&B Song–while also being nominated for Record of the Year and Song of the Year, in 2001. A Joseph Kahn-directed accompanying music video was a subject of controversy, as it saw LeToya Luckett and LaTavia Roberson be replaced–without their knowledge or consent–with Farrah Franklin and Michelle Williams. The video won Destiny's Child their first MTV Video Music Award, for Best R&B Video in 2000. "Jumpin', Jumpin'" was released as the fourth and final single from The Writing's on the Wall on July 17, 2000. A commercial success, it peaked at number three on the US Billboard Hot 100 and became the group's first US Mainstream Top 40 number-one single. The single was certified platinum by the RIAA in July 2020, denoting sales of one million units in the US. Internationally, the song attained top 10 positions in Australia, Canada, Iceland, the Netherlands, New Zealand, and the UK. Its music video was Destiny's Child's second consecutive to be directed by Kahn, and shows the members going out to a nightclub. "So Good" was serviced to rhythmic contemporary radio in the US as the sole promotional single from The Writing's on the Wall on January 16, 2001.

== Critical reception ==
Professional ratings
Review scores
| Source | Rating |
|---|---|
| AllMusic | 4/5 stars |
| The Encyclopedia of Popular Music | 4/5 stars |
| Entertainment Weekly | B |
| The Guardian | 3/5 stars |
| NME | 6/10 |
| Pitchfork | 9.0/10 |
| Q | 4/5 stars |
| Rolling Stone | 2/5 stars |
| The Rolling Stone Album Guide | 4/5 stars |
| The Village Voice | B+ |

On release, The Writing's on the Wall was met with mixed to positive reviews from music critics. Stephen Thomas Erlewine from AllMusic wrote that, regardless of "uneven" songwriting, the album was an improvement for Destiny's Child in comparison to their debut, further complimenting the production and selection of collaborators. In a review for NME, Dele Fadele praised the record's contemporary sound, citing "Confessions" and "If You Leave" as its highlights. Rob Brunner from Entertainment Weekly praised Destiny's Child for being able to surpass their contemporaries with an innovative sound, but dismissed the "banal balladry" of "Stay" and "Sweet Sixteen". Writing for The Village Voice, Robert Christgau commended the group for sounding mature but criticized the album's lyrical content. Rob Sheffield from Rolling Stone was, however, more negative towards The Writing's on the Wall, writing: "Despite OK moments like the 'Waterfalls' sequel 'Sweet Sixteen', the Destiny children never find that one money tune that turns a no-no-no scrub into a yeah-yeah-yeah paying customer." British magazine The Face declared the album the ninth best of 1999. The Writing's on the Wall won the Soul Train Lady of Soul Award for Best R&B/Soul Album in 2000, being nominated for Best R&B/Soul Album – Group, Band or Duo at the 2000 Soul Train Music Awards, and for Favorite Soul/R&B Album at the American Music Awards of 2001.

Retrospective commentaries saw critical acclaim for The Writing's on the Wall prevail over initial criticism. In The New Rolling Stone Album Guide (2004), Sheffield referenced his own 1999 review by writing that the singles "Say My Name" and "Jumpin', Jumpin'" were, indeed, "catchy enough to turn any no-no-no scrub into yeah-yeah-yeah paying customer". Katherine St. Asaph from Pitchfork praised The Writing's on the Wall for its impact and influence on R&B artists, remarking that its musical style codified contemporary R&B trends at the turn of the millennium. Taryn Finley of HuffPost shared St. Asaph's sentiments, labeling The Writing's on the Wall "the quintessential 1999 album". Wren Graves from Consequence drew attention to standout non-single tracks, but dismissed "Temptation" and "If You Leave" as "dull spots". Based on The Writing's on the Wall, Q included Destiny's Child among "100 Women Who Rock the World" in 2002. In 2007, the Rock and Roll Hall of Fame listed the album among their "Definitive 200", while Vibe highlighted it as one of "The 150 Albums That Define the Vibe Era". Entertainment Weekly listed the album as one of the 100 best albums of 1983–2008. In 2017, Complex listed The Writing's on the Wall among the best R&B albums of the 1990s, while NPR called it the 61st greatest female album of all time. Okayplayer's Dashan Smith hailed it as one of the most influential R&B albums of the 1990s, and Emily Tartanella of PopMatters called it one of the most memorable albums of 1999. Rolling Stone placed the album at number 291 on the 2020 edition of The 500 Greatest Albums of All Time; NME also included it on their ranking of the 500 greatest albums of all time. In 2022, Heven Haile of Pitchfork listed The Writing's on the Wall among the 150 best albums of the 1990s.

== Commercial performance ==
In the US, The Writing's on the Wall debuted at number six on the Billboard 200 chart dated August 14, 1999, with first-week sales of 133,000 copies. On the Top R&B/Hip-Hop Albums, it debuted and peaked at number two the same week. The album was the 42nd best-selling album of 1999, selling 1.6 million copies by the end of the year. The heavy rotation of its third single "Say My Name" and increased promotional activities reinvigorated the album's sales. Seven weeks after "Say My Name" reached the summit of the Billboard Hot 100, The Writing's on the Wall registered a new single-week sales high with 157,000 units. It subsequently went on to ascend towards a new peak on the Billboard 200 at number five on May 6, 2000. During the Christmas week of 2000, the album achieved its highest single-week sales with 163,000 units, while remaining stable within the top 40 in its 74th week of charting. On the year-end Billboard 200 for 2000, it placed at number 13, and was the 10th best-selling album of the year with sales of 3.8 million copies. In total, The Writing's on the Wall spent 99 consecutive weeks on the Billboard 200, exiting from the chart in July 2001. On November 6, the album was certified octuple platinum by the RIAA, for shipments of eight million units in the US. As of 2015, The Writing's on the Wall has sold over seven million units in the country, being the second best-selling girl group album ever in the US. (Note: According to Nielsen SoundScan, The Writing's on the Wall has sold 6,400,000 copies in the United States as of 2015. Nielsen SoundScan did not count sales through music clubs such as BMG Music Service, through which the album sold around 700,000 additional units by February 2003, bringing its sales total to 7,100,000 units.)

Internationally, The Writing's on the Wall was a sleeper hit. It debuted at number 13 on the Canadian Albums Chart dated August 14, 1999, peaking at number five after a year of charting on August 26, 2000. The album was certified quintuple platinum by the Canadian Recording Industry Association (CRIA) on February 28, 2001, denoting shipments of 500,000 units in Canada. In Australia, The Writing's on the Wall debuted at number nine on the ARIA Top 100 Albums and peaked at number two in its third week. It was certified triple platinum by the Australian Recording Industry Association (ARIA) in February 2001, for shipments of 210,000 units in the country. In New Zealand, The Writing's on the Wall debuted at number 30, peaking at number six nine weeks later. Recording Industry Association of New Zealand (RIANZ) certified it triple platinum in November 2000, denoting shipments of 45,000 copies in the country. In the United Kingdom, The Writing's on the Wall debuted at number 12 on the UK Albums Chart and atop the UK R&B Albums Chart. In August 2000, it was certified platinum by the British Phonographic Industry (BPI) for shipping 300,000 units in the UK. After 70 weeks of fluctuations, the album peaked at number 10 on the UK Albums Chart on January 6, 2001. The Writing's on the Wall peaked at number 23 on the European Top 100 Albums after being reissued, and was certified double platinum by the International Federation of the Phonographic Industry (IFPI) for selling two million copies across Europe. In addition, it eventually ascended to the top 10 in Belgium, Ireland, the Netherlands, Norway, and Portugal after debuting at lower positions. With worldwide sales of 13 million copies, The Writing's on the Wall is the fourth best-selling girl group album of all time, also being one of the best-selling R&B albums of all time.

== Controversy ==
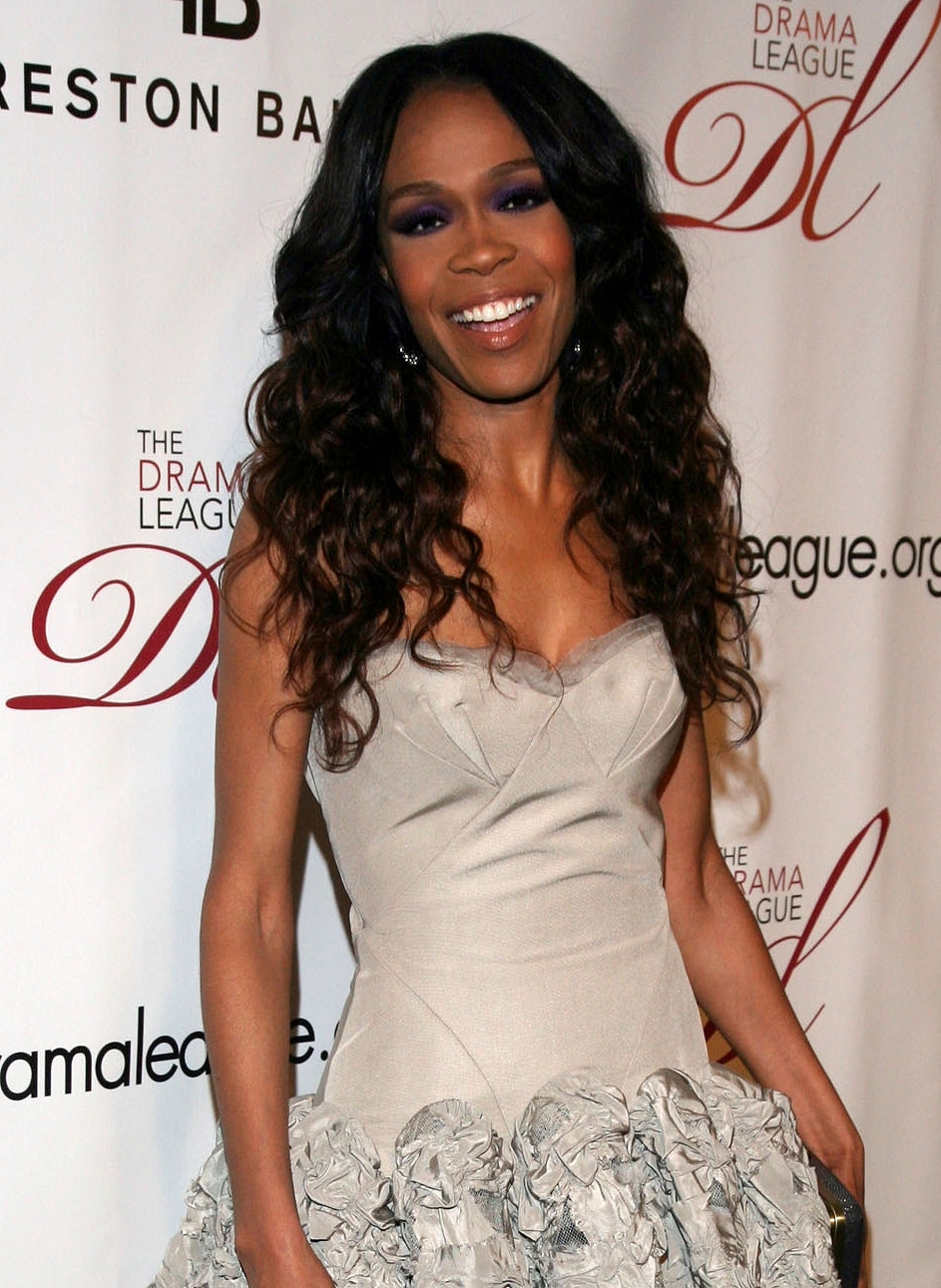
Amid the promotional cycle for The Writing's on the Wall, Michelle Williams (pictured) and Farrah Franklin joined Destiny's Child as replacements for LeToya Luckett and LaTavia Roberson.

The promotional era of The Writing's on the Wall was infused with controversy and conflicts within Destiny's Child's members and management. In December 1999, Luckett and Roberson attempted to split with their manager Mathew Knowles, stating that he kept a disproportionate share of the group's profits and unfairly favored his daughter Beyoncé and Rowland. While they never intended to leave Destiny's Child, they found out that two new members were joining Beyoncé and Rowland once the music video for "Say My Name" premiered on February 15, 2000. Prior to its premiere, Beyoncé announced on Total Request Live that Luckett and Roberson had left the group. They were replaced by Williams, a former backing vocalist to Monica, and Franklin, an aspiring singer-actress. On March 15, 2000, Roberson and Luckett filed a lawsuit against Knowles and their former bandmates for breach of partnership and fiduciary duties. Following the lawsuit, both sides were disparaging towards each other in the media.

A mere five months after joining, Franklin left Destiny's Child. The remaining members stated that this was due to missed promotional appearances and concerts. According to Williams, Franklin could not handle stress. Franklin, however, disclosed that she left because of the negativity surrounding the strife and her inability to assert any control in the decision-making. Her departure was seen as less controversial. Williams, on the other hand, felt pressured and later revealed that her inclusion in the group resulted in insecurity, as she was comparing herself to fellow members. Towards the end of 2000, Roberson and Luckett dropped the portion of their lawsuit aimed at Beyoncé and Rowland in exchange for a settlement, though they continued the action against Knowles. As part of the agreement, both sides were prohibited from speaking about each other publicly. Roberson and Luckett formed another girl group, named Anjel, but it ultimately disbanded in 2003 without having released an album.

== Legacy ==
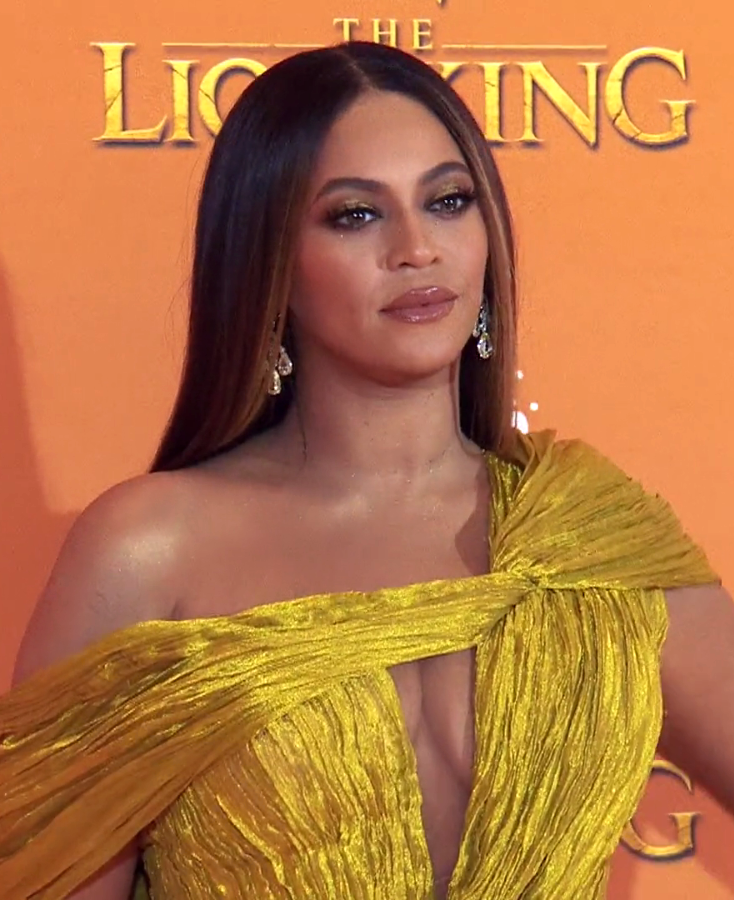
The Writing's on the Wall has been credited for allowing Beyoncé (pictured in 2019) to launch her solo career. Several critics have also noted its lyrical influence on her sixth solo studio album Lemonade (2016).

The Writing's on the Wall has been declared Destiny's Child's breakthrough album by numerous music critics, as it spurred their career and introduced them to a wider audience. Chris Malone from Billboard retrospectively credited the album with quickly establishing Destiny's Child among the most iconic girl groups of all time. Regardless of the controversy surrounding its promotional activities, The Writing's on the Wall emerged unaffected and became one of the best-selling R&B albums of all time. Although members were agitated by the turmoil, Destiny's Child's success continued, with the years following the controversy seen as the most substantial stretch of their career, and them becoming a pop culture phenomenon. Their third studio album Survivor (2001) and its title track are considered responses to the media for the scrutiny the group was placed under throughout the promotional era of The Writing's on the Wall. Multiple critics have also noted the album for being the platform upon which Beyoncé would launch her solo career. Tom Breihan from Stereogum shared those sentiments, adding that Beyoncé managed to successfully recognize sounds reshaping R&B aesthetics and acquire technical skills to recreate it in an idiosyncratic manner. He additionally noted that the album would creatively pave the way for her sixth solo studio album Lemonade (2016), as its lyrical themes evoked those of The Writing's on the Wall.

Despite initial skepticism towards The Writing's on the Wall, various critics went on to acknowledge its immense impact on R&B and pop music in retrospective commentary, crediting it for having defined the sound of mainstream music at the turn of the millennium. Music industry writer Naima Cochrane called the album one of the most important recordings of the transitional phase between the 1990s and 2000s, adding that it set the tone for mainstream R&B trends of the then-forthcoming decade and helped popularize urban adult contemporary music. Its feminist lyrical undertones have also received recognition. In a 2019 interview with Vice, Burruss–one of the key contributors on The Writing's on the Wall–said the influence of its feminist themes was evident even two decades following its release, citing women's empowerment-themed efforts by artists such as Rihanna, Lizzo, and Megan Thee Stallion. Furthermore, the album is credited with introducing and popularizing staccato rap-singing, most distinguishably via "Bug a Boo" and "Say My Name". Canadian rapper Drake was cited as one of the artists who sought vocal inspiration from the album, most notably on his 2013 track "Girls Love Beyoncé", on which James Fauntleroy sang the chorus of "Say My Name". Artistic influence of The Writing's on the Wall has expanded into imagery as well, as the music videos for Kehlani's 2016 song "Distraction" and Tove Styrke's 2017 song "Say My Name" have been described as homages to the music video for "Say My Name".

== Track listing ==
The Writing's on the Wall
| No. | Title | Writer(s) | Producer(s) | Length |
|---|---|---|---|---|
| 1. | "Intro (The Writing's on the Wall)" | Beyoncé Knowles; Kelly Rowland; LeToya Luckett; LaTavia Roberson | Knowles; Donald Holmes; Gerard Thomas; Anthony Hardy | 2:05 |
| 2. | "So Good" | Knowles; Rowland; Luckett; Kandi Burruss; Roberson; Kevin Briggs | Briggs^{[a]}; Kandi^{[b]} | 3:13 |
| 3. | "Bills, Bills, Bills" | Knowles; Rowland; Luckett; Burruss; Briggs | Briggs^{[a]}; Knowles^{[b]} | 4:16 |
| 4. | "Confessions" (featuring Missy "Misdemeanor" Elliott) | Holmes; Thomas; Melissa Elliott | M. Elliott; Thomas^{[c]}; Holmes^{[c]} | 4:57 |
| 5. | "Bug a Boo" | Knowles; Rowland; Luckett; Roberson; Burruss; Briggs | Briggs^{[a]}; Kandi^{[b]} | 3:32 |
| 6. | "Temptation" | Knowles; Rowland; Luckett; Roberson; Dwayne Wiggins; Carl Wheeler; Anthony Ray | Wiggins; Terry T^{[c]} | 4:05 |
| 7. | "Now That She's Gone" | Ken Fambro; Donnie Boynton; Tara Geter; Latrelle Simmons; Aleese Simmons | Fambro; Boynton | 5:35 |
| 8. | "Where'd You Go" | Knowles; Rowland; Luckett; Roberson; Marques Houston; Kelton Kessee; Tony Scott; Chris Stokes | Knowles; Platinum Status; Stokes | 4:15 |
| 9. | "Hey Ladies" | Knowles; Rowland; Luckett; Roberson; Burruss; Briggs | Briggs^{[a]}; Kandi^{[b]}; Knowles^{[d]} | 4:16 |
| 10. | "If You Leave" (featuring Next) | Robert Huggar; Tyvette Turman; Chad Elliott; Oshea Hunter | C. Elliott; Hunter | 4:35 |
| 11. | "Jumpin', Jumpin'" | Knowles; Rufus Moore; C. Elliott | C. Elliott; Knowles; Jovonn Alexander | 3:50 |
| 12. | "Say My Name" | Knowles; Rowland; Luckett; Roberson; Rodney Jerkins; Fred Jerkins III; LaShawn Daniels | R. Jerkins; Daniels^{[b]} | 4:31 |
| 13. | "She Can't Love You" | Knowles; Rowland; Luckett; Roberson; Burruss; Briggs | Briggs^{[a]}; Kandi^{[b]}; Knowles^{[b]} | 4:04 |
| 14. | "Stay" | Daryl Simmons | D. Simmons | 4:51 |
| 15. | "Sweet Sixteen" | Knowles; Rowland; Wiggins; Jody Watley | Wiggins; Knowles^{[c]} | 4:12 |
| 16. | "Outro (Amazing Grace... Dedicated to Andretta Tillman)" | John Newton^{[f]} | Knowles | 2:38 |
| Total length: | | | | 64:52 |

International edition
| No. | Title | Writer(s) | Producer(s) | Length |
|---|---|---|---|---|
| 17. | "Get on the Bus" (featuring Timbaland) | Timothy Mosley; M. Elliott | Timbaland; M. Elliott | 4:44 |
| Total length: | | | | 69:36 |

Japanese edition
| No. | Title | Writer(s) | Producer(s) | Length |
|---|---|---|---|---|
| 16. | "Get on the Bus" (featuring Timbaland) | Mosley; M. Elliott | Timbaland; M. Elliott | 4:44 |
| 17. | "Bills, Bills, Bills" (Digital Black-N-Groove Club Mix) | Knowles; Rowland; Luckett; Burruss; Briggs | Briggs^{[a]}; Kandi^{[b]}; Maurice Joshua^{[e]}; Ron Carroll^{[e]} | 7:16 |
| Total length: | | | | 74:14 |

European limited edition bonus disc (Note: In the Netherlands, music videos for "No, No, No Part 2" and "Get on the Bus" are replaced with their respective TMF live performance videos.)
| No. | Title | Writer(s) | Producer(s) | Length |
|---|---|---|---|---|
| 1. | "Bills, Bills, Bills" (remix featuring Sporty Thievz) | Alvin West; Channette Higgens; Channoah Higgens; Curtis Jackson; Kirk Howell; Shaarod Ford; Marlon Bryan; Nycolia Turman | West; Poke and Tone^{[c]} | 4:00 |
| 2. | "No, No, No Part 2" (featuring Wyclef Jean) | Herbert; Fusari; Brown; Gaines | Wyclef; Duplessis^{[c]}; Greene^{[c]} | 3:33 |
| 3. | "Say My Name" (Timbaland Remix) | Knowles; Rowland; Luckett; Roberson; F. Jerkins III; R. Jerkins; Daniels; Mosley; Sean Garrett | R. Jerkins; Daniels^{[b]}; Timbaland^{[e]} | 7:33 |
| 4. | "No, No, No Part 2" (featuring Wyclef Jean) (music video) |
| 5. | "Get on the Bus" (music video) |
| Total length: | | | | 15:06 |

European reissue bonus disc
| No. | Title | Writer(s) | Producer(s) | Length |
|---|---|---|---|---|
| 1. | "Independent Women Part I" | Knowles; Samuel Barnes; Jean-Claude Olivier; Cory Rooney | Knowles; Poke and Tone; Rooney | 3:42 |
| 2. | "Independent Women Part II" | Knowles; Rapture Stewart; Eric Seats; David Donaldson; Frank Comstock | Knowles; Stewart; Seats | 3:46 |
| 3. | "8 Days of Christmas" | Knowles; Errol McCalla | Knowles; Mathew Knowles | 3:31 |
| 4. | "No, No, No Part 2" (featuring Wyclef Jean) | Herbert; Fusari; Brown; Gaines | Wyclef; Duplessis^{[c]}; Greene^{[c]} | 3:28 |
| Total length: | | | | 14:27 |

Notes

- ^a signifies a producer and vocal producer
- ^b signifies a vocal producer
- ^c signifies a co-producer
- ^d signifies an additional vocal producer
- ^e signifies an additional producer
- ^f signifies the lyrics being credited to public domain
- Tracks 1–15 end with brief interludes spoken by the group members, each of which relates to the following track. Each interlude represents a Ten Commandments-inspired "Commandment of Relationships".
- Enhanced CD pressings include the music video for "No, No, No Part 1".

Sample credits

- "Temptation" contains resung elements from "Whatever You Want" by Tony! Toni! Toné! and "Posse on Broadway" by Sir Mix-a-Lot.

== Personnel ==
Credits are adapted from the liner notes of The Writing's on the Wall.

- Charles Alexander – mixing (track 11)
- Jovonn Alexander – production (track 11)
- Steve Baughman – mixing assistance (track 3)
- Chris Bell – engineering (track 10)
- Donnie "D-Major" Boynton – production (track 7), songwriting (track 7)
- Kevin "She'kspere" Briggs – engineering (tracks 2, 3, 5, 9 and 13), executive production, instrumentation (tracks 2, 3, 5, 9 and 13), Midi & Sound (tracks 2, 3, 5 and 13), production (tracks 2, 3, 5, 9 and 13), songwriting (tracks 2, 3, 5, 9 and 13), vocal production (tracks 2, 3, 5, 9 and 13)
- Joe Bruer – engineering (track 8)
- Kandi Burruss – songwriting (tracks 2, 3, 5, 9 and 13), vocal production (tracks 2, 5, 9 and 13)
- Michael Calderon – engineering (tracks 1, 3 and 6)
- LaShawn Daniels – engineering (track 12), songwriting (track 12), vocal production (track 12)
- Kevin "KD" Davis – mixing (tracks 2, 3, 5, 9 and 13)
- Andre DeBaurg – engineering (tracks 10 and 11)
- David Donaldson – engineering (track 11)
- Jimmy Douglass – engineering (track 4)
- Blake Eiseman – engineering (track 7)
- Chad "Dr. Ceuss" Elliott – mixing (track 11), production (tracks 10 and 11), songwriting (tracks 10 and 11)
- Missy "Misdemeanor" Elliott – production (track 4), songwriting (track 4), vocals (track 4)
- Ken "K-Fam" Fambro – production (track 7), songwriting (track 7)
- Ronnie Garrett – bass (track 14)
- Jon Gass – mixing (track 14)
- Tara Geter – songwriting (track 7)
- Brad Gildem – engineering (track 12)
- Anthony Hardy – instrumentation (track 1), production (track 1)
- Donald "Lenny" Holmes – instrumentation (track 1), production (tracks 1 and 4), songwriting (track 4)
- James Hoover – engineering (tracks 7, 15 and 16)
- Jean Marie Horout – mixing (track 12)
- R.L. Huggar – songwriting (track 10)
- Oshea Hunter – production (track 10), songwriting (track 10)
- Fred Jerkins III – songwriting (track 12)
- Rodney Jerkins – production (track 12), songwriting (track 12), vocals (track 12)
- Thom "TK" Kidd – engineering (track 14)
- Kiko – art direction, design
- Beyoncé Knowles – additional vocal production (track 9), arrangement (track 16), backing vocals (all tracks), lead vocals (all tracks), production (tracks 1, 8, 15 and 16), songwriting (tracks 1–3, 5, 6, 8, 9, 11–13 and 15), vocal arrangement (tracks 6 and 16), vocal production (tracks 3 and 13)
- Mathew Knowles – executive production, mixing (track 16)
- Mike Kopcha – mixing assistance (tracks 2, 5, 9 and 13)
- Sonny Lallerstedt – guitar (track 14)
- Vincent Lars – saxophone (track 15)
- Kevin Lively – engineering assistance (track 14)
- LeToya Luckett – backing vocals (all tracks), lead vocals (track 1), songwriting (tracks 1–3, 5, 6, 8, 9, 12 and 13)
- Steve McCauley – mixing assistance (tracks 4 and 15)
- Raymond McKinley – bass (track 15)
- Rufus Moore – songwriting (track 11)
- Ramon Morales – engineering (tracks 5, 9 and 13)
- Vernon Mungo – engineering (track 3)
- Next – vocals (track 10)
- Hide Olda – photography
- Bill Ortiz – trumpet (track 15)
- Lance Pierre – mixing assistance (track 8)
- Platinum Status – drum programming (track 8), keyboards (track 8), production (track 8), songwriting (track 8)
- Claudine Pontier – engineering assistance (track 3)
- Anthony Ray – songwriting (track 6)
- Ted Regier – mixing assistance (tracks 4, 6, 7 and 15)
- Byron Rittenhouse – vocals (track 11)
- LaTavia Roberson – backing vocals (all tracks), lead vocals (tracks 1, 8 and 15), songwriting (tracks 1, 2, 5, 6, 8, 9, 12 and 13)
- Kelly Rowland – backing vocals (all tracks), lead vocals (tracks 1–5, 7, 8, 10, 13, 15 and 16), songwriting (tracks 1–3, 5, 6, 8, 9, 12, 13 and 15)
- Albert Sanchez – photography
- Aleese Simmons – songwriting (track 7)
- Daryl Simmons – drum programming (track 14), keyboards (track 14), production (track 14), songwriting (track 14)
- Dexter Simmons – mixing (tracks 4, 6, 8, 10 and 15)
- Latrelle Simmons – songwriting (track 7), vocal arrangement (track 7)
- Ivy Skoff – production coordination (track 14)
- Charles Spikes – guitar (track 6)
- Brian Springer – engineering (track 4)
- Kenny Stallworth – engineering assistance (track 7)
- Chris Stokes – production (track 8), songwriting (track 8)
- Joey Swails – engineering (tracks 6 and 15)
- Terry-T – bass (track 6), drum machine (track 6), keyboards (track 6), production (track 6)
- Gerard Thomas – instrumentation (track 1), production (tracks 1 and 4), songwriting (track 4)
- Tyvette Turman – songwriting (track 10)
- Stephanie Vonarx – engineering assistance (track 14)
- Chuck Walpole – engineering (track 6)
- Jody Watley – songwriting (track 15)
- Carl Wheeler – songwriting (track 6)
- Teresa LaBarbera Whites – A&R
- D'wayne Wiggins – bass (track 6), drum machine (track 15), guitar (tracks 6 and 15), production (tracks 6 and 15), songwriting (tracks 6 and 15), synthesizer (track 15)
- Tony Williams – additional drum programming (track 14)
- Dan Workman – engineering (tracks 2 and 5)

== Charts ==
=== Weekly charts ===
1999–2001 weekly chart performance
| Chart | Peak position |
|---|---|
| Australian Albums (ARIA) | 2 |
| Australian Dance Albums (ARIA) | 2 |
| Australian Urban Albums (ARIA) | 1 |
| Austrian Albums (Ö3 Austria) | 18 |
| Belgian Albums (Ultratop Flanders) | 8 |
| Belgian Albums (Ultratop Wallonia) | 19 |
| Canadian Albums (Billboard) | 5 |
| Canadian R&B Albums (Nielsen SoundScan) | 2 |
| Danish Albums (Hitlisten) | 16 |
| Dutch Albums (Album Top 100) | 3 |
| European Top 100 Albums (Music & Media) | 23 |
| Finnish Albums (Suomen virallinen lista) | 15 |
| French Albums (SNEP) | 32 |
| German Albums (Offizielle Top 100) | 21 |
| Irish Albums (IRMA) | 3 |
| Japanese Albums (Oricon) | 33 |
| Malaysian Albums (RIM) | 6 |
| New Zealand Albums (RMNZ) | 6 |
| Norwegian Albums (VG-lista) | 7 |
| Portuguese Albums (AFP) | 10 |
| Scottish Albums (Official Charts) | 16 |
| Swedish Albums (Sverigetopplistan) | 21 |
| Swiss Albums (Schweizer Hitparade) | 23 |
| UK Albums (Official Charts) | 10 |
| UK R&B Albums (Official Charts) | 1 |
| US Billboard 200 | 5 |
| US Top R&B/Hip-Hop Albums (Billboard) | 2 |

=== Year-end charts ===
1999 year-end chart performance
| Chart | Position |
|---|---|
| Canadian Top Albums/CDs (RPM) | 99 |
| Dutch Albums (Album Top 100) | 44 |
| UK Albums (OCC) | 78 |
| US Billboard 200 | 88 |
| US Top R&B/Hip-Hop Albums (Billboard) | 48 |

2000 year-end chart performance
| Chart | Position |
|---|---|
| Australian Albums (ARIA) | 13 |
| Belgian Albums (Ultratop Flanders) | 37 |
| Belgian Albums (Ultratop Wallonia) | 43 |
| Canadian Albums (Nielsen SoundScan) | 15 |
| Dutch Albums (Album Top 100) | 42 |
| European Top 100 Albums (Music & Media) | 83 |
| New Zealand Albums (RMNZ) | 7 |
| UK Albums (OCC) | 22 |
| US Billboard 200 | 13 |
| US Top R&B/Hip-Hop Albums (Billboard) | 12 |

2001 year-end chart performance
| Chart | Position |
|---|---|
| Belgian Albums (Ultratop Wallonia) | 66 |
| Canadian Albums (Nielsen SoundScan) | 192 |
| Canadian R&B Albums (Nielsen SoundScan) | 41 |
| European Top 100 Albums (Music & Media) | 80 |
| UK Albums (OCC) | 82 |
| US Billboard 200 | 87 |

=== Decade-end charts ===
2000s decade-end chart performance
| Chart | Position |
|---|---|
| US Billboard 200 | 39 |

=== All-time charts ===
All-time chart performance
| Chart | Position |
|---|---|
| Belgian Albums (Ultratop Flanders) | 92 |

== Certifications ==
Certifications and sales
| Region | Certification | Certified units/sales |
|---|---|---|
| Australia (ARIA) | 3× Platinum | 210,000^{^} |
| Belgium (BRMA) | Platinum | 50,000^{*} |
| Brazil | — | 20,000 |
| Canada (Music Canada) | 5× Platinum | 500,000^{^} |
| Denmark (IFPI Danmark) | 2× Platinum | 40,000^{‡} |
| France (SNEP) | 2× Gold | 200,000^{*} |
| Germany (BVMI) | Gold | 250,000^{^} |
| Netherlands (NVPI) | 2× Platinum | 200,000^{^} |
| New Zealand (RMNZ) | 3× Platinum | 45,000^{^} |
| Norway (IFPI Norway) | Gold | 25,000^{*} |
| Norway (IFPI Norway) Reissue | Platinum | 20,000^{‡} |
| Sweden (GLF) | Gold | 40,000^{^} |
| Switzerland (IFPI Switzerland) | Gold | 25,000^{^} |
| United Kingdom (BPI) | 3× Platinum | 1,120,878 |
| United States (RIAA) | 8× Platinum | 7,100,000 |
Summaries
| Europe (IFPI) | 2× Platinum | 2,000,000^{*} |
| Worldwide | — | 13,000,000 |
^{*} Sales figures based on certification alone.^{^} Shipments figures based on certification alone.^{‡} Sales+streaming figures based on certification alone.

== Release history ==
Release dates and formats
| Region | Date | Format(s) | Label(s) | Ref. |
|---|---|---|---|---|
| Japan | July 14, 1999 | CD | Sony Japan | |
| France | July 22, 1999 | CD | Columbia | |
| Germany | July 23, 1999 | CD | Sony | |
| United Kingdom | July 26, 1999 | Cassette; CD; MiniDisc; vinyl | Columbia | |
| United States | July 27, 1999 | Cassette; CD; enhanced CD; MiniDisc; vinyl | Columbia | |
| Australia | October 15, 1999 | Enhanced CD | Sony | |
| Germany | April 10, 2000 | CD + enhanced CD | Sony | |
| United Kingdom | November 13, 2000 | Double CD | Columbia | |
| Germany | November 27, 2000 | Double CD | Sony | |

== See also ==
- Destiny's Child discography
- List of UK R&B Albums Chart number ones of 1999
- List of best-selling girl group albums
- Rolling Stone's 500 Greatest Albums of All Time
- The Platinum's on the Wall
