= LaTavia Roberson =

American R&B singer (born 1981)

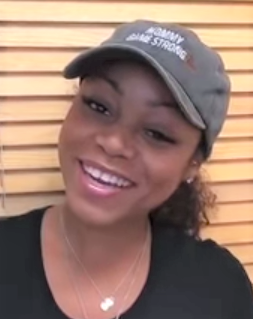
- Roberson in 2018
- Born: LaTavia Marie Roberson; November 1, 1981 (age 45); Houston, Texas, U.S.
- Occupation: Singer
- Years active: 1990–present
- Partner: Don Vito
- Children: 2
- Musical career
- Genre: R&B
- Labels: Columbia; Fleet Street
- Formerly of: Destiny's Child; Anjel

LaTavia Marie Roberson (born November 1, 1981) is an American R&B singer. She rose to fame in the late 1990s as an original member of the R&B group Destiny's Child, one of the world's best-selling girl groups of all time. During her time as a member, Roberson recorded two studio albums, sold over 25 million records, and won two Grammy Awards and three Soul Train Music Awards.

Roberson has starred in several stage productions. In 2014, she became a main cast member of the television series R&B Divas: Atlanta alongside singers Angie Stone, Keke Wyatt and Meelah of 702.

== Early life ==
Roberson was born on November 1, 1981 in Houston, Texas. In the 1980s, before joining Destiny's Child, Roberson was a child model, appearing in commercials such as Soft and Beautiful's Just for Me hair care relaxer for kids.

== Career ==
=== 1990–2000: Girl's Tyme and Destiny's Child ===
When LaTavia was eight years old, she auditioned to be a rapper and dancer in a local girl group. She met Beyoncé Knowles at this audition, and the two became best friends. Singing and dancing with other young girls, LaTavia and Beyoncé made a video for a song called "One Time," which almost led to them becoming a duo. LaTavia then met Kelly Rowland in elementary school; she was in the third grade while Rowland was in the fourth grade. After hearing Rowland sing, LaTavia suggested that she audition for the group, which she did. Initially, due to her duties as a rapper and dancer, LaTavia did not sing; subsequently, she took vocal lessons and began singing at local events. She got her break when she entered the singing competition on the TV show Star Search alongside Beyoncé, Kelly, Tamar Davis, and LaTavia's cousins Nikki and Nina Taylor. The group, then named Girl's Tyme, were heartbroken after losing the competition to Skeleton Crew. Beyoncé's father Mathew Knowles began managing the group and changed the line-up, reducing it to a quartet consisting of LaTavia, Beyoncé, Kelly, and Beyoncé's elementary-school friend LeToya Luckett. The group also underwent several name changes: The Dolls, Something Fresh, Cliché, and Destiny.

In 1995, they signed to Elektra Records but were later dropped from the label. D'wayne Wiggins soon began working on music with the group, briefly signing them to Grass Roots Entertainment, and the Wiggins-produced song "Killing Time" was included on the Men in Black soundtrack. After plenty of training to become prepared and ready for the music industry, they were signed to Columbia Records in 1997 as Destiny's Child, with Knowles as lead vocalist, Rowland as second-lead vocalist, and Roberson and Luckett as background vocalists. Roberson was the alto, and Luckett was the soprano. Roberson was also designated as the group's spokesperson. In early 1998, Destiny's Child released their self-titled debut album. Two singles were released: "No, No, No" (featuring Wyclef Jean on the "Part II" remix), and "With Me." Roberson can be heard rapping on the album track "Illusions." Later in 1998, their song "Get on the Bus" featuring Timbaland (released as a single in Europe) was included on the Why Do Fools Fall in Love soundtrack.

In 1999, Destiny's Child released their second album The Writing's on the Wall. It became one of the biggest-selling albums ever released by a female group, and was certified eight-times platinum in the U.S. It includes four hit singles: "Bills, Bills, Bills," "Bug a Boo," "Say My Name," and "Jumpin', Jumpin'." LaTavia contributed more co-writing credit on this album than their first, and performed lead on two songs, "Sweet Sixteen" and "Where'd You Go." Additionally, she sang lead on the song "Can't Help Myself," which was only included on the album's Houston Edition. In late 1999, during the success of The Writing's on the Wall, Roberson and Luckett attempted to bring in a third-party mediator to work with their manager Mathew Knowles; however, they soon found themselves on the outs with Knowles. When the video for "Say My Name" debuted in February 2000, the pair learned they'd been replaced by Michelle Williams and Farrah Franklin, leading to several lawsuits, with the outcome being that Roberson and Luckett were entitled to royalties from the albums they had recorded with the group.

While in Destiny's Child, LaTavia appeared in music videos for other artists, including Jagged Edge. Roberson performed with that group in their live shows, and toured as an opening act on TLC's FanMail Tour. She also appeared in the sitcom Smart Guy and the film Beverly Hood alongside the other members.

=== 2001–2003: Anjel ===
Following the break-up, Roberson and Luckett won two Grammy Awards for their contribution to Destiny's Child's "Say My Name." Subsequently, they formed a group called Anjel with two other girls, Naty Quiñones and Tiffany Beaudoin. In 2000, Linda Casey, the mother of Jagged Edge's Brian and Brandon Casey, held a talent search in Connecticut, bringing in Natasha Ramos to join Roberson and Luckett as the third member. Due to personality differences, however, Ramos soon left the group. Before leaving, though, she introduced Casey, Roberson, and Luckett to Quiñones, who auditioned and was added to the group. In February 2001, Anjel attended the Grammy Awards. Later that year, Tiffany Beaudoin was introduced to Anjel by a mutual friend, and joined after an audition. They recorded a 22-track demo in Atlanta with assistance from Jagged Edge, planning to release an album titled "Heavenly." They also appeared in the music video for Jagged Edge's "Where the Party At" remix. Anjel made one live appearance in 2001 on WNYW Fox 5's "Good Day New York," where they were interviewed about the album they were working on and sang part of their song "Missing You." However, 581 Entertainment, the production company that handled the group, disbanded, and Anjel went their separate ways. 581 Entertainment was run by Jagged Edge as a subsidiary of So So Def Recordings, which at the time was itself was an imprint of Columbia Records. When So So Def owner Jermaine Dupri decided to leave Columbia, it caused an existential problem for 581 Entertainment. Before Dupri's move, "Heavenly" was on track for release, but Anjel's members decided to look into individual projects while their business issues were being sorted out. In 2003, however, 581 Entertainment folded, Anjel disbanded, and "Heavenly" was shelved before its completion. Nevertheless, some completed tracks were later leaked to the internet.

=== 2004–2012: Personal endeavors and solo career ===
In 2005, LaTavia was invited to replace Kandi in the group Xscape, but passed on the opportunity due to her priority to take care of her family at home in Houston.

In July 2006, it was confirmed by LaTavia herself that she had been quietly recording her debut album on and off since March of that year. Collaborating with producer Scott Storch, and hoping to also work with Houston rappers Mike Jones and Slim Thug, she was quick to point out it was in no way an attempt to recreate the success of LeToya Luckett. The album, to be titled "Black Summer's Night," would be a mix of hip-hop, jazz, and soul, featuring contributions by Swizz Beatz, Polow da Don, and André 3000 of Outkast, and a 2009 release was tentatively planned. However, the album was never completed.

In 2007, LaTavia, LeToya Luckett, and Farrah Franklin appeared in the TV series Boulevard of Broken Dreams, giving their takes on events that occurred during their tenure with Destiny's Child.

In 2008, Roberson appeared in the stage play Those Jeans, which ran from April 18 to July 12. It was described as "a truly well-written love story about a fashion designer and a high-fashion photographer looking for love in all the wrong places."

In 2009, LaTavia was featured on the song "Swagga Check" by Young Sween from his album The Goodie Room, released by Fleet Street Records. It was mistakenly titled "Holdin on to You" on iTunes.

In 2010, LaTavia appeared in an episode of The Real Housewives of Atlanta speaking to her then-lawyer Phaedra Parks, during which Roberson discussed her struggle with alcohol and resulting DWI arrest.

=== 2013–2015: R&B Divas, stage plays and motherhood ===
In 2013, LaTavia starred in J.F. Bailey's stage plays How to Love and Not My Family. That same year, she became a mother for the first time. In 2014, Roberson was added to the main cast of R&B Divas: Atlanta season 3, her storyline including her reluctance to sing on the show, as she felt she wasn't ready to do so. Season 3 of R&B Divas consisted of eleven episodes starring LaTavia (including the reunion shows). To promote the series, she appeared on The Wendy Williams Show in May 2014. In 2015, Roberson announced she had become involved in the beauty industry with Luxury Hair Direct, which specializes in hair extensions. She also became involved with the charity 'Saving Our Daughters'.

=== 2016–2022: Web-series, films, return to music, and sports ===
In 2016, Roberson began a YouTube series titled "The Online Diary of LaTavia Roberson." In an interview with People magazine, she confirmed plans to release an autobiography titled I Am LaTavia, which she described as a memoir dedicated to her fans. Roberson was later embroiled in a feud with the magazine after alleging they misquoted and misrepresented her interview online. The memoir, originally set for publication in the spring of 2017, remains unreleased.

In 2017, Roberson made her cinematic debut as an actress in the horror film But Deliver Us from Evil, starring Eric Roberts. She also appeared in two additional movies, Dirty South House Arrest and The Hills. On June 23, 2017, she released her first solo song, an EDM track titled "Best Time of Your Life." In November 2018, she founded Roberson Sports Management, with plans of representing up-and-coming boxers. Roberson also launched a boxing magazine titled Slugfest. The first issue, featuring Roy Jones Jr., was published in March 2019. The magazine ceased publication in 2020.

=== 2023–present: Le Papillon Foundation, fashion and cosmetics line ===
In 2023, Roberson launched Le Papillon Foundation, a nonprofit organization for young girls, and her Queens Collection makeup line. She showcased the Fall/Winter 2024 collection of her fashion line, LMR Collection, at New York Fashion Week, in February 2024.

== "Survivor" lawsuit ==
In March 2000, Roberson and Luckett filed a lawsuit against Mathew Knowles and Destiny's Child, precipitating a media battle in which the opposing factions exchanged disparaging remarks in magazine and newspaper interviews. Roberson and Luckett agreed to a settlement that required them to drop the part of their lawsuit targeting their former group members (though they retained the suit against Mathew Knowles) and required both sides to cease disparaging each other in public. Roberson and Luckett later filed an additional suit against Destiny's Child, claiming that the single "Survivor," from the group's eponymous 2001 album, violated their previous settlement. As evidence, Roberson and Luckett cited lyrics including, "Thought I wouldn't sell without you, sold nine million," which they believed referenced the split. In July 2002, Destiny's Child again settled out of court with the pair.

== Personal life ==
In 2010, Roberson revealed that she had battled an alcohol problem after splitting with Destiny's Child, resulting in her arrest for driving while intoxicated. She sought treatment which led to her recovery, and is using the experience to help others.

On August 21, 2013, Roberson gave birth to a daughter with producer Don Vito. In 2016, she suffered the late-term pregnancy loss of a baby girl. On September 23, 2019, Roberson's management team announced via Instagram that she had given birth to a boy, her second child with Vito.

Roberson is an honorary member of Sigma Gamma Rho sorority.

== Discography ==
Studio albums with Destiny's Child

- Destiny's Child (1998)
- The Writing's on the Wall (1999)

Collaborative albums

- Heavenly (2003) (unreleased album with Anjel)

Singles

- 2009 – "Swagga Check" (Young Sween featuring LaTavia Roberson)
- 2017 – "Best Time of Your Life"
- 2017 – "Baby Love Crazy" (Darryl Allen featuring LaTavia Roberson)
- 2018 – Nia featuring Bryant McCarty, Latavia Roberson and Dajione – "Lord's Prayer" (gospel song)

== Filmography ==
Film
Year	Title	Role	Notes
1999	Beverly Hood	Girl#4	
2017	But Deliver Us from Evil	Stacey	
2017	Dirty South House Arrest	Tamika	
2017	The Hills	Marie	
2023	Renaissance: A Film by Beyoncé	Herself	Cameo

Television
Year	Title	Role	Notes
1998	Smart Guy	Herself	"A Date with Destiny"
1999	Pacific Blue	Herself	"Ghost Town"
2007	Boulevard of Broken Dreams	Herself	"Episode 2: Destiny's Child/Jonathan Brandis"
2010, 2017	Real Housewives of Atlanta	Herself	2 episodes
2014	R&B Divas: Atlanta	Herself	Main Cast
2014	The Wendy Williams Show	Herself	Guest
2015	L.A. Hair	Herself	1 episode
2017	Great Day Houston	Herself	Guest

== Plays ==
- Those Jeans (2008)
- How to Love (2013)
- Not My Family (2013)

== Book ==
- I Am LaTavia: My Story, My Destiny (TBA)

== Grammy Awards ==
The Grammy Awards are awarded annually by the National Academy of Recording Arts and Sciences. Roberson has won 2 awards from 5 nominations.

Year	Nominated work	Award	Result
2000	Best R&B Performance By A Duo Or Group With Vocal	"Bills, Bills, Bills"	Nominated
2001	Best R&B Performance By A Duo Or Group With Vocal	"Say My Name"	Won
2001	Best R&B Song	"Say My Name"	Won
2001	Record of the Year	"Say My Name"	Nominated
2001	Song of the Year	"Say My Name"	Nominated
