= Say My Name =

1999 single by Destiny's Child

- US CD single

Single by Destiny's Child

from the album The Writing's on the Wall
- B-side: "Bills, Bills, Bills"
- Released: October 14, 1999
- Recorded: 1999
- Studio: Pacifique (North Hollywood, California)
- Genre: R&B; pop
- Length: 4:31 (album version); 4:00 (radio/video edit)
- Label: Columbia
- Songwriters: Rodney Jerkins; Fred Jerkins III; LaShawn Daniels; Beyoncé Knowles; LeToya Luckett; Kelly Rowland; LaTavia Roberson
- Producer: Rodney Jerkins

Destiny's Child singles chronology
"Thug Love" (1999)	"Say My Name" (1999)	"Jumpin', Jumpin'" (2000)

Music video
- "Say My Name" on YouTube

"Say My Name" is a song by the American group Destiny's Child from their second studio album, The Writing's on the Wall (1999). It was written by Beyoncé Knowles, LeToya Luckett, LaTavia Roberson, Kelly Rowland, LaShawn Daniels, Fred Jerkins III, and Rodney Jerkins, featuring production by the latter. "Say My Name" was released as the third single from The Writing's on the Wall on October 14, 1999, by Columbia Records. While the song features the group's original line-up consisting of Luckett and Roberson, the music video for the single marked the introduction of the group's second line-up with replacement members Michelle Williams and Farrah Franklin. In some territories, including the United States, single artwork for the song features the previous lineup, while releases in other territories such as the United Kingdom and France feature newer images of the second lineup.

"Say My Name" was the most successful of the four singles from The Writing's on the Wall, becoming Destiny's Child's second number-one single in the United States and their first in Australia. It also reached the top 10 in Canada, France, Iceland, the Netherlands, New Zealand, Norway, Poland, the United Kingdom, and Wallonia. Critically acclaimed, the song won two Grammy Awards at the 2001 ceremony for Best R&B Performance by a Duo or Group with Vocals and Best R&B Song, while also being nominated for Record of the Year and Song of the Year.

The accompanying music video for "Say My Name" won the 2000 MTV Video Music Award for Best R&B Video. The song also won a Soul Train Lady of Soul Award for Best R&B/Soul Single, Group, Band or Duo and a BMI Pop Award for Most Played Song. Billboard ranked the song at number seven on their list of the "100 Greatest Girl Group Songs of All Time" and named it the best song of 2000. In 2021, Rolling Stone placed the song at number 285 on its list of the 500 Greatest Songs of All Time while Pitchfork ranked it at number eight on their 2022 list of "The 250 Best Songs of the 1990s".

== Writing and production ==
"Say My Name" was the group's first collaboration with producer-songwriter Rodney Jerkins, who was one out of several people hired to work with Destiny's Child on their second album. The demo for the track had a different approach, with Jerkins saying that it was inspired by 2-step garage music he heard while in a club in London. When they wrote the song, however, the lead singer Beyoncé Knowles was initially displeased with the track they were working on. She commented that there was "too much stuff" on the track and it sounded like a "jungle". During the photo shoot for the album, Beyoncé's father-manager Mathew Knowles went to the studio informing her that Jerkins reworked on the track she "hated". He told her to "just have to take a listen to it". When the new mix was played to the group, they liked it.

== Music and lyrics ==
Lyrically, "Say My Name" has a female protagonist telephoning her lover and suspecting him of cheating. She asks him to "say her name". The young man hesitates, and the narrator believes it is because he does not want the girl he is cheating with to know who she is. Jerkins supported the song's lyrics with a backing track that shifts back and forth in dynamics, steadily bringing different elements, including syncopated, 808 drum programming, synthesized strings and 1970s-style wah-wah guitar licks, in and out of the mix. Knowles sings lead on the verses and bridge and leads the melody of the chorus with Kelly Rowland adding the second part harmony. LeToya Luckett sings the high harmony on the pre-chorus and second chorus. LaTavia Roberson sings second part harmony with LeToya on the pre-chorus and sings the bottom harmony late in the second chorus.

== Release ==
"Say My Name" was first released in Japan as a maxi-CD on October 14, 1999, containing various mixes of "Bug a Boo" as B-sides. The single was then released in Australia on January 31, 2000, via the same format but with a different track listing that includes the album version of "Bills, Bills, Bills". In the United States, the song began getting radio airplay by select broadcast stations in November 1999. It was later officially sent to urban contemporary radio on January 10, 2000, and was issued physically on February 29, 2000, across four formats: CD, maxi-CD, 12-inch vinyl, and cassette. These "Say My Name" singles have several remixes that were included alongside the original version, including remixes by Timbaland, Maurice Joshua, and Dreem Teem. The Timbaland remix features guest appearances from Static Major and Timbaland himself. Elsewhere, various versions of the single were released in France in March and April 2000, in the United Kingdom on March 27, and in Germany on April 10.

== Commercial performance ==
"Say My Name" debuted at number 83 on the US Billboard Hot 100. After being released on physical formats, it reached the top of the chart in its 13th week, selling 134,000 copies during its first week of commercial availability. It took longer than any other of Destiny's Child's number-one singles to reach the top. The song spent a total of 32 weeks on the Billboard Hot 100 and was one of the top ten best-selling CD singles of 2000 in the United States. It also reached the top of both the Radio Songs and the Hot R&B/Hip-Hop Songs charts for three weeks in 2000. "Say My Name" is the group's third best-selling single in the US after "No, No, No" and "Bills, Bills, Bills", and was also their third single to be certified gold by the Recording Industry Association of America (RIAA).

In the United Kingdom, it was the group's biggest hit up to that point, peaking at number three on the UK Singles Chart and selling over 190,000 copies. The single enabled the group to break into the Asian market, when R&B music was just beginning to receive strong airplay. In the Philippines, it became the longest number-one single by an R&B girl group, topping the charts for seven weeks. In Australia, it was the second single ever by an R&B girl group to reach number one on the ARIA Singles Chart, after TLC's "No Scrubs", and helped propel The Writing's on the Wall to multi-platinum status. In Europe, the song reached the top 10 in France, Iceland, the Netherlands, Norway, Poland, and Wallonia. It also entered the top 20 in Flanders, Germany, Sweden, and Switzerland.

== Music video ==
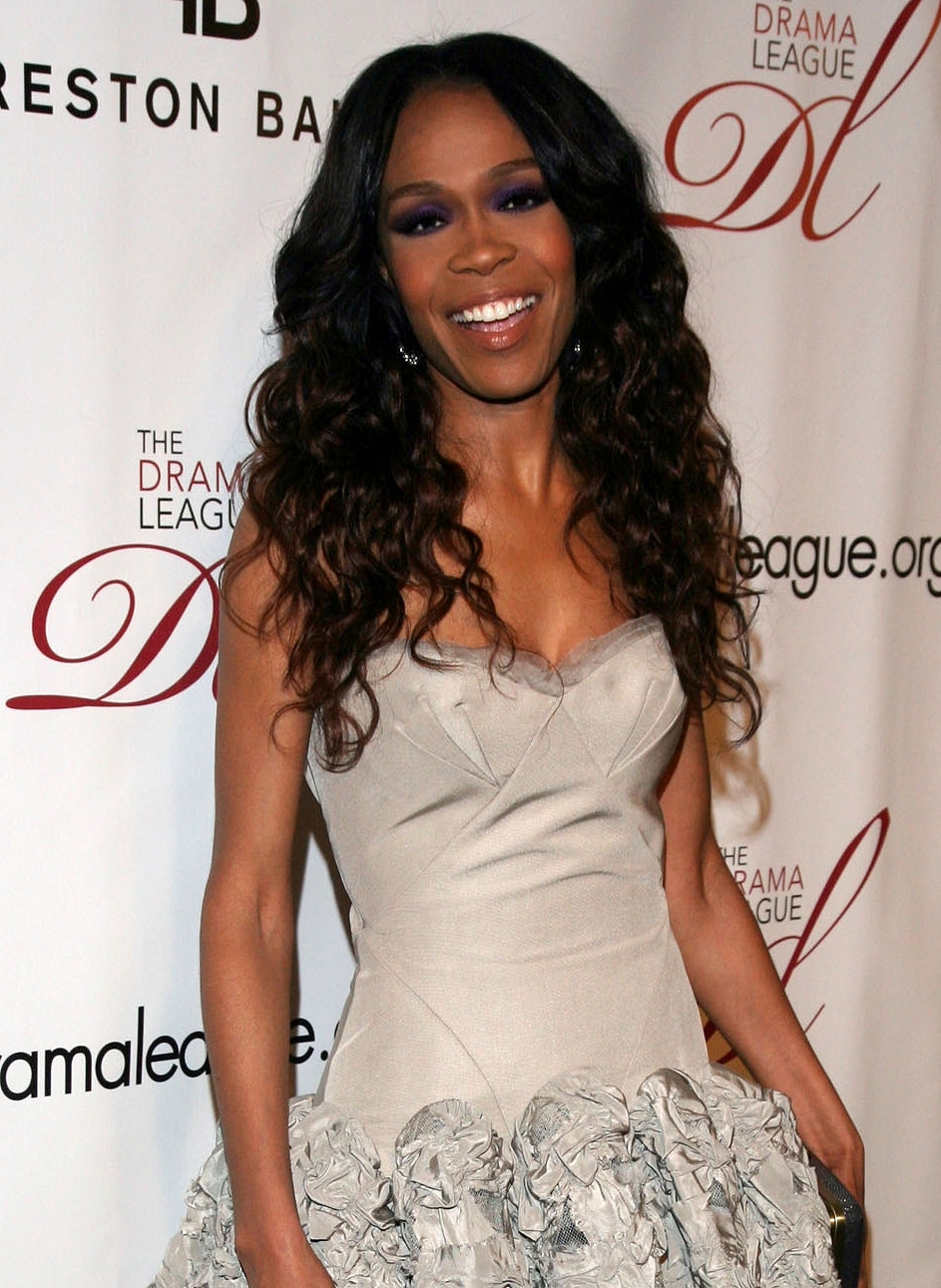
The video for "Say My Name" marked the group debut of Michelle Williams (pictured) and Farrah Franklin.

Conflict among members of the group arose in December 1999, following allegations that the group's manager and Knowles' father, Mathew Knowles, was withholding group profits from Luckett and Roberson. They then allegedly asked Knowles for more money; they were dismissed from the group in January 2000. That same month, Mathew Knowles recruited Franklin and Williams to replace both without the signed members' consent or knowledge. The video for "Say My Name" was then filmed with little time for the new members to learn the choreography. The video premiered on February 15, 2000, with Franklin and Williams alongside Knowles and Rowland, on MTV and BET simultaneously with the publication of a press release announcing the line-up change. Luckett and Roberson's vocals still appear on the song, despite their absence from the video. Franklin and Williams's vocals are not included on the track.

The video, directed by Joseph Kahn, shows the four members along with two females and one male dancer singing and dancing in color-coded sets resembling apartment living rooms. Rowland is in blue clothes to match her equally blue room. Knowles is in an orange room, while Franklin is in a red room and Williams in a white room. After the first verse and the chorus, the girls, along with furniture from their respective color-coded sets, switch rapidly between the other members' sets. Soon after the second verse, all girls gather in a garage-like room complete with cars and Destiny's Child in black PVC-pants and orange tops and all of the dancers, dressed in black, from the video.

== Legacy ==
In October 2011, NME placed it at number 58 on its list "150 Best Tracks of the Past 15 Years" and Pitchfork Media placed it at number 131 on its "The Top 500 Tracks of the 2000s". On VH1's list of the 100 best songs of the 1990s, "Say My Name" was ranked at number 17. In 2021, Rolling Stone placed the song at number 285 on its list of the 500 Greatest Songs of All Time, while Pitchfork, at number 8 on their 2022 list of "The 250 Best Songs of the 1990s".

Jody Rosen from The New Yorker credited Beyoncé's slippery rap-style syncopations in the song with creating a new sound that did not exist in the world before her. He further wrote, "If they sound 'normal' now, it's because Beyoncé, and her many followers, have retrained our ears."

== Track listings ==
US CD and cassette single

1. "Say My Name" (album version) – 4:28
2. "Say My Name" (Timbaland remix) – 5:01

US maxi-CD single

1. "Say My Name" (album version) – 4:28
2. "Say My Name" (Timbaland remix) – 5:01
3. "Say My Name" (Maurice's Last Days of Disco Millennium mix) – 7:35
4. "Say My Name" (Daddy D Remix with rap) – 4:48
5. "Say My Name" (album version featuring Kobe Bryant) – 4:27

US 12-inch single

A1. "Say My Name" (album version featuring Kobe Bryant) – 4:27
A2. "Say My Name" (Daddy D Remix with rap) – 4:48
A3. "Say My Name" (Maurice's Last Days of Disco Millennium mix) – 7:35
B1. "Say My Name" (album instrumental) – 4:31
B2. "Say My Name" (Daddy D Remix instrumental) – 4:48
B3. "Say My Name" (Maurice's Old Skool dub mix) – 7:35

UK CD1

1. "Say My Name" – 4:28
2. "Say My Name" (Storm Mix by Tariq) – 4:35
3. "Say My Name" (Timbaland remix) – 5:01

UK CD2

1. "Say My Name" (Dreem Teem club mix) – 5:45
2. "Say My Name" (Noodles mix) – 5:17
3. "Say My Name" (Maurice's Bass 2000 mix) – 4:20

European CD1

1. "Say My Name" (radio edit) – 3:46
2. "Say My Name" (Timbaland remix) – 5:02

European CD2

1. "Say My Name" (album version) – 4:28
2. "Say My Name" (Timbaland remix) – 5:01
3. "Say My Name" (album version featuring Kobe Bryant) – 4:27
4. "Say My Name" (Daddy D remix without rap) – 4:48

Australian and New Zealand CD single

1. "Say My Name" (album version) – 4:31
2. "Say My Name" (a cappella) – 4:31
3. "Say My Name" (instrumental) – 4:31
4. "Bills, Bills, Bills" (album version) – 4:00
5. Multimedia

Japanese CD single

1. "Say My Name" (album version) – 4:31
2. "Bug a Boo" (Refugee Camp remix featuring Wyclef Jean)
3. "Bug a Boo" (Maurice's Xclusive Bug a Boo club mix)
4. "Bug a Boo" (Maurice's Bug a Dub mix)

== Credits and personnel ==
Credits are taken from The Writing's on the Wall album booklet.

Studio

- Recorded and mixed at Pacifique Studio (North Hollywood, California)

Personnel

- Rodney Jerkins – writing, all music, production
- Fred Jerkins III – writing
- LaShawn Daniels – writing, vocal production, recording
- Beyoncé Knowles – writing
- LeToya Luckett – writing
- Kelly Rowland – writing
- LaTavia Roberson – writing
- Brad Gildem – recording
- Jean-Marie Horvat – mixing

== Charts ==
=== Weekly charts ===
Chart (2000)	Peak position
Australia (ARIA)	1
Belgium (Ultratop 50 Flanders)	19
Belgium (Ultratop 50 Wallonia)	7
Canada Top Singles (RPM)	4
Canada Dance/Urban (RPM)	4
Canada (Nielsen SoundScan)	9
Europe (European Hot 100 Singles)	11
France (SNEP)	10
Germany (GfK)	14
Iceland (Íslenski Listinn Topp 40)	7
Ireland (IRMA)	15
Netherlands (Dutch Top 40)	4
Netherlands (Single Top 100)	7
New Zealand (Recorded Music NZ)	4
Norway (VG-lista)	8
Poland Airplay (Music & Media)	2
Scottish Singles Sales (Official Charts)	13
Sweden (Sverigetopplistan)	16
Switzerland (Schweizer Hitparade)	20
UK Singles (Official Charts)	3
UK Airplay (Music Week)	10
UK Hip Hop/R&B (Official Charts)	2
US Billboard Hot 100	1
US Dance Club Songs (Billboard)	39
US Dance Singles Sales (Billboard)	1
US Hot R&B/Hip-Hop Songs (Billboard)	1
US Pop Airplay (Billboard)	3
US Rhythmic Airplay (Billboard)	1

Chart (2016)	Peak position
South Korea (Gaon)	64

=== Year-end charts ===
Chart (2000)	Position
Australia (ARIA)	5
Belgium (Ultratop 50 Flanders)	95
Belgium (Ultratop 50 Wallonia)	48
Europe (European Hot 100 Singles)	59
France (SNEP)	66
Iceland (Íslenski Listinn Topp 40)	26
Netherlands (Dutch Top 40)	41
Netherlands (Single Top 100)	63
New Zealand (RIANZ)	28
UK Singles (OCC)	71
UK Airplay (Music Week)	37
UK Urban (Music Week)	16
US Billboard Hot 100	6
US Hot R&B/Hip-Hop Singles & Tracks (Billboard)	11
US Mainstream Top 40 (Billboard)	19
US Maxi-Singles Sales (Billboard)	3
US Rhythmic Top 40 (Billboard)	6

=== Decade-end charts ===
Chart (2000–2009)	Position
Australia (ARIA)	50

== Certifications ==
Region	Certification	Certified units/sales
Australia (ARIA)	2× Platinum	140,000^{^}
Belgium (BRMA)	Gold	25,000^{*}
Brazil (Pro-Música Brasil) Homecoming Live Version	Gold	30,000^{‡}
Denmark (IFPI Danmark)	Platinum	90,000^{‡}
France (SNEP) Sales in 2000	Gold	250,000^{*}
France (SNEP) Sales since 2016	Gold	66,666^{‡}
Germany (BVMI) Timbaland remix featuring Static	Gold	250,000^{‡}
New Zealand (RMNZ)	5× Platinum	150,000^{‡}
Portugal (AFP)	Gold	20,000^{‡}
Spain (Promusicae)	Gold	30,000^{‡}
United Kingdom (BPI)	3× Platinum	2,122,942
United States (RIAA)	3× Platinum	3,000,000^{‡}
^{*} Sales figures based on certification alone.^{^} Shipments figures based on certification alone.^{‡} Sales+streaming figures based on certification alone.

== Release history ==
Release dates and formats for "Say My Name"
Region	Date	Format(s)	Label(s)	Ref.
Japan	October 14, 1999	Maxi CD	SME	
United States	November 1999	Promotional recording	Columbia	
United States	January 10, 2000	Urban contemporary radio	Columbia	
Australia	February 4, 2000	Maxi CD	Sony Music	
United States	February 29, 2000	12-inch vinyl; cassette; CD; maxi CD	Columbia	
France	March 13, 2000	Maxi CD	Sony Music	
United Kingdom	March 27, 2000	Cassette; two maxi CDs	Columbia	
Germany	April 10, 2000	Maxi CD	Sony Music	
France	April 17, 2000	CD	Sony Music	

== Cover versions ==
In 2021, English rapper ArrDee released his third solo single, "Flowers". The song heavily samples the track of the same name by Sweet Female Attitude and interpolates "Say My Name". It peaked at number 5 on the UK's Official Singles Chart Top 100, spending thirteen weeks in the Top 40, seventeen weeks in the Top 100, with seven of those weeks being in the chart's Top 10.

== In popular culture ==
In February 2020, the first trailer for the horror film Candyman (2021) was released with a slowed-down version of the song.

== See also ==
- List of number-one singles in Australia in 2000
- List of Billboard Hot 100 number-one singles of 2000
- List of number-one R&B singles of 2000 (U.S.)
