= Farrah Franklin =

American R&B singer (born 1981)

- Also known as: Destiny Franklin
- Born: Farrah Laron Franklin; May 3, 1981 (age 45); Des Moines, Iowa, U.S.
- Genres: R&B
- Occupations: Singer, songwriter, actress, dancer
- Years active: 1999–present
- Labels: Columbia (2000), Fo' Reel (2002–2003)
- Formerly of: Destiny's Child

Farrah Laron Franklin (born May 3, 1981) is an American R&B singer and actress. She is also a former member of the girl group Destiny's Child. Along with Michelle Williams, she replaced the group's original members LaTavia Roberson and LeToya Luckett. Franklin spent several months with the group before departing as a member. While her musical contribution to the group was minimal, Franklin's vocals are featured on the group's single "Independent Women Part I" which peaked at number one on the Billboard Hot 100 chart following her departure.

== Early life ==
Franklin was born in Des Moines, Iowa, and raised in Fresno, California. She was named after Farrah Fawcett by her grandmother, who was named after Lana Turner. Franklin considers Lawrence Bohanon to be her father, as she never met her biological father, Rodney Allen Heard. Franklin is of African-American and Italian descent, and the oldest of eighteen children, including a younger sister named Karrie. She is also the cousin of late singer and rapper Natina Reed. Franklin grew up attending church. She started singing at age two, inspired by Bohanon, who played bass guitar in local bands. When Franklin was eight, she began performing in plays at the Fresno Memorial Auditorium. She was in the concert choir at Central High School, where she was bullied. At fifteen, Franklin decided to leave Fresno to pursue a career in entertainment following her aunt's relocation to Los Angeles. She went by the name 'Destiny Franklin' before her stint in Destiny's Child.

== Career ==
=== 1999–2000: Destiny's Child ===
In 1999, while living in Los Angeles, Franklin was hired to be an extra in the music video for Destiny's Child's "Bills, Bills, Bills". It was there that she met with group members Beyoncé Knowles, Kelly Rowland, LeToya Luckett, and LaTavia Roberson. At the time, she was in a fledgling singing group called Jane Doe, which was in the process of disbanding. In January 2000, Mathew Knowles invited Franklin and Michelle Williams to join Destiny's Child, replacing previous group members LeToya and LaTavia without notice. The two were introduced to fans in February 2000, by appearing in the music video for "Say My Name". Franklin toured and performed with the group, and also appeared in the music video for "Jumpin', Jumpin'". She contributed vocals to various Destiny's Child songs, including "Jumpin', Jumpin'" (Remixes), "Upside Down" (Live at VH1 Divas), and "Dot", as well as a few tracks on Survivor, released after her departure, like "Independent Women" and "Dance with Me".

On July 20, 2000, after six months with Destiny's Child, Franklin exited the group. A day later, group member Beyoncé claimed in an interview that Franklin had missed three major promotional dates and expressed a lack of interest in continuing with the group, leaving them with no other choice but to dismiss her. In a later interview, Franklin denied Beyoncé's allegation, stating that she had suffered from dehydration and a stomach virus but was recovering as she traveled with the group to do shows in Seattle and Europe. Farrah contended that after being verbally attacked by management, due to her not showing up because she was ill, she stormed out of the room and quit the group.

=== 2001–present: Solo projects and Pheenx ===
After leaving Destiny's Child, Franklin embarked on a solo career. From 2002 to 2003, she was signed to and dropped from Fo' Reel, where she recorded a song titled "Get at Me" with Method Man. She then spent two years signed to Fabolous's street label, Street Family Entertainment, before getting dropped in 2005. Prior to joining Destiny's Child, Franklin appeared in the 1999 feature film Trippin' and began an acting career, starring in 2004's The Brewster Project. In 2006, she was cast in an episode on the sitcom, All of Us. She shot an independent thriller film called Eyes of Darkness, which also featured rapper Jayo Felony, and starred in other films like Single Black Female. She also modeled for Russell Simmons' fashion line Def Jam University and was featured on the covers of Teen People, Ebony, CosmoGirl, Vibe, and Today's Black Woman. Aside from her work as a replacement member in Destiny's Child, she has cameoed in several music videos for artists like Kurupt, Nelly, Mr. Cheeks, and R. L. Huggar.

In January 2007, Franklin made an appearance with other former members of Destiny's Child in the E! special Boulevard of Broken Dreams, which documented their experiences in Destiny's Child and the issues that Franklin faced during the months she was present in the group. Franklin insisted that she was mistreated and ignored by management during meetings when she asked questions about the massive deductions in the group's paychecks.

She released a single called "Lollipop" in 2008. In 2009, Franklin joined a new girl group called Pheenx which consisted of members Bethany Grant, Queen, and herself. The group released two singles titled "Post Boy" and "Sharpshooter" before Grant, the lead singer, was dismissed from the trio due to her involvement in pornography. The group later disbanded.

In 2014, Franklin moved from Los Angeles to Atlanta, hoping to restart her career in music. In 2015, she released a promotional single called "Magic n Makeup" to all streaming markets on September 15. The music video for the single was released via her official Vevo channel on September 24. In 2016, Franklin released a song titled "Over" and uploaded another called "Billion Dollar Fantasy" to SoundCloud in 2017. In 2018, she collaborated with singer Lucky Harmon on the song "Build Me Up", which she cowrote. Franklin also owns a company called One Love Pictures and Entertainment. In June 2020, she released the single "Push Up On Me" featuring rapper Maino.

== Personal life ==
In June 2016, Franklin was detained by police in DeKalb County, Georgia on charges of public intoxication and marijuana possession. This incident mirrored her 2011 arrest in Culver City, California and her 2014 arrest in Myrtle Beach, South Carolina. Franklin's biological father, Rodney Allen Heard, died in July 2017.

On August 23, 2022, Houston mayor Sylvester Turner declared December 2 as the City of Houston's Farrah Franklin Day. Later that year, she was also honored with the Presidential Lifetime Achievement Award in Houston.

Franklin currently lives in Atlanta, Georgia.

== Filmography ==
=== Film ===
Year	Title	Role	Notes
1999	Trippin'	Girl on bed #2	
2004	The Brewster Project	Maya	
2008	Unemployed	Unemployment Clerk	
2009	Single Black Female	Karma	
2011	The Preacher's Family	LaJune Carter	
2015	Tamales and Gumbo	Brenda	
2016	Rated ATL	Ne Ne	

=== Television ===
Year	Title	Role	Notes
2006	All of Us	Robert's date	1 episode

=== Music videos ===
Year	Title	Artist	Ref.
1999	"Say My Name"	Destiny's Child	
2000	"Jumpin', Jumpin'"	Destiny's Child	
2000	"You Owe Me"	Nas, Ginuwine	
2001	"It's Over"	Kurupt	
2001	"Good Love"	RL	
2002	"#1"	Nelly	
2003	"Crush on You"	Mr. Cheeks	
2009	"Nothing's Wrong"	Won-G	
2010	"The Hard Way"	Yukmouth	
2010	"Rock Ya Body"	Dallas Blocker	
2013	"Hurry Please"	Farrah Franklin	
2015	"I'll Give You Time"	Charles Wright	
2015	"Magic and Make Up"	Farrah Franklin	
2018	"Build Me Up"	Farrah Franklin	

== Discography ==
Singles

- 2008: "Lolli Pop"
- 2015: "Magic N Makeup"
- 2016: "Over"
- 2017: "Billion Dolla Fantasy"
- 2018: "Build Me Up" (with Lucky Harmon)
- 2020: "Push Up On Me"
