= Bug a Boo (song) =

1999 single by Destiny's Child

Single by Destiny's Child

from the album The Writing's on the Wall
- B-side: "So Good"; "Bills, Bills, Bills"
- Released: July 7, 1999
- Recorded: December 1998
- Studio: SugarHill Recording Studios (Houston, TX); Triangle Sound Studios (Atlanta, GA)
- Genre: R&B
- Length: 3:31
- Label: Columbia
- Songwriters: Kevin "She'kspere" Briggs; Kandi Burruss; Beyoncé Knowles; LeToya Luckett; LaTavia Roberson; Kelendria Rowland
- Producer: She'kspere

Destiny's Child singles chronology
"Bills, Bills, Bills" (1999)	"Bug a Boo" (1999)	"Thug Love" (1999)

Music video
- "Bug a Boo" on YouTube

"Bug a Boo" is a song recorded by American group Destiny's Child for their second studio album The Writing's on the Wall (1999). It was written by group members Beyoncé Knowles, LeToya Luckett, LaTavia Roberson and Kelly Rowland along with Kandi Burruss and Kevin "She'kspere" Briggs, featuring production by the latter. The song uses interpolations of the 1978 song "Child's Anthem" by Toto.

"Bug a Boo" was released as the second single from The Writing's on the Wall on July 7, 1999 by Columbia Records. "Bug a Boo" peaked at number 33 on the Billboard Hot 100. Outside of the United States, "Bug a Boo" peaked within the top ten of the charts in the Netherlands and the United Kingdom, and peaked within the top 30 of the charts in Australia.

== Background ==
"Bug a Boo" is a song that Kandi Burruss and Kevin Briggs worked with Destiny's Child with for their second album. When Burruss and Briggs were brainstorming song ideas to the group, "Bug a Boo" was one of the first songs to be discussed and created. The group initially did not like it as Burruss stated that they were unsure on how they could sing over the track as it seemed like an instrumental that you would rap over.

== Commercial performance ==
"Bug a Boo" debuted at No. 87 on the Billboard Hot 100 on September 25, 1999, and peaked at No. 33 before descending the chart. It spent a total of 20 weeks on the chart. Following the huge success of "Bills, Bills, Bills", "Bug a Boo" was a commercial disappointment. It performed better on Hot R&B/Hip-Hop Songs, reaching No. 15, but remains one of only three Destiny's Child's singles not to reach the top ten on that chart. The Refugee Camp Remix version of the song refers to its commercial failure, with the opening lyrics saying the group was doing "it right the second time".

In the Netherlands, "Bug a Boo" peaked at number six on the Dutch Single Top 100, spending 15 weeks on the chart.

In the United Kingdom, "Bug a Boo" debuted and peaked at number nine on the UK Singles Chart on October 24, 1999 – for the week ending date October 30, 1999 – becoming Destiny's Child's third top ten song in Britain, following "No, No, No" in March 1998 and "Bills, Bills, Bills" in July 1999.

In Australia, "Bug a Boo" peaked at number 26 on the ARIA Singles Chart, becoming the fourth and final song from "The Writing's on the Wall" to chart there.

== Music video ==
The video was directed by Darren Grant on August 18, 1999. It was the group's final music video to feature former members LaTavia Roberson and LeToya Luckett.

In the video, the group are walking down Melrose Avenue in Los Angeles, CA. Four men are driving a red car, trying to attract their attention, but the girls of Destiny's Child are uninterested. The girls accidentally run into a men's locker room where they see basketball star Kobe Bryant getting ready for a game. In the next shot, the group are wearing gold cheerleader outfits doing a routine cheer with Wyclef Jean as bandleader. The marching scene was filmed at Fairfax High School. The marching band in the video were actual members of the UCLA Marching Band. By the end of the video, the group members meet up with the four men from earlier. They all drive away in the red car, laughing.

A second version of the video was produced for the "Refugee Camp Remix" with additional footage from the same session. The original music video is featured on the video compilation The Platinum's on the Wall, whereas the video for the "Refugee Camp Remix" was never released to any disc.

The music video for "Bug a Boo" premiered on BET the week ending September 12, 1999. It later made its debut on MTV the following week ending September 19, 1999. Beyoncé's gold two piece outfit from the shoot is on display at the Hard Rock Cafe restaurant in San Francisco, California.

== Track listings ==
European Maxi CD

1. "Bug a Boo" (album version) – 3:31
2. "Bug a Boo" (Refugee Camp Remix) (featuring Wyclef Jean)^{1} – 4:02
3. "Bug a Boo" (Maurice's Xclusive "Bug A Boo" Dub Mix)^{2} – 8:08
4. "Bug a Boo" (Maurice's Bug A Dub Mix)^{2} – 7:14

US promo 12" vinyl
Side A

1. "Bug a Boo" (Maurice's Xclusive "Bug a Boo" Club Mix)^{2} – 8:08
2. "Bug a Boo" (Refugee Camp Remix) (featuring Wyclef Jean)^{1} – 4:02

Side B

1. "Bug a Boo" (Maurice's "Bug a Boo" Dub Mix)^{2} – 7:14
2. "Bug a Boo" (album version) – 3:31
3. "Bug a Boo" (Maurice's Xclusive "Bug a Boo" Club Mix a cappella)^{2} – 5:58

UK promo single

1. "Bug a Boo" (album version) – 3:31

UK Maxi CD Part 1 CA 668188 2

1. "Bug a Boo" (album version) – 3:31
2. "So Good" (album version) – 3:14
3. "Bills, Bills, Bills" (album version) – 4:16
4. "Bills, Bills, Bills" (music video)

UK Maxi CD Part 2 with Poster CA 668188 5

1. "Bug a Boo" (album version) – 3:31
2. "Bug a Boo" (Refugee Camp Remix) (featuring Wyclef Jean)^{1} – 4:02
3. "Bug a Boo" (Maurice's Xclusive "Bug A Boo" Club Mix)^{2} – 6:59

European Maxi CD COL 667779 5

1. "Bug a Boo" (album version) – 3:31
2. "Bug a Boo" (Maurice's Xclusive "Bug a Boo" Club Mix)^{2} – 8:08
3. "Bug a Boo" (Maurice's "Bug a Boo" Dub Mix)^{2} – 7:14
4. "Bug a Boo" (Gentleman's Revenge) (featuring Gentleman) – 3:55

European 2-track single
German promo SAMPCS 1510

1. "Bug a Boo" (album version) – 3:31
2. "Bug a Boo" (Refugee Camp Remix) (featuring Wyclef Jean)^{1} – 4:02

Australian Maxi CD Part 1

1. "Bug a Boo" (album version) – 3:31
2. "Bug a Boo" (Maurice's Xclusive "Bug a Boo" Club Mix)^{2} – 8:09
3. "Bug a Boo" (Maurice's "Bug a Boo" Dub Mix)^{2} – 7:14
4. "Bug a Boo" (a cappella) – 3:13

Australian Maxi CD Part 2

1. "Bug a Boo" (album version) – 3:31
2. "Jumpin', Jumpin'" (So So Def Remix) (featuring Da Brat, Jermaine Dupri, & Lil' Bow Wow) - 3:45
3. "Jumpin', Jumpin'" (Azza's Radio Mix) - 4:10
4. "Jumpin', Jumpin'" (Maurice's Radio Mix) - 4:05

Notes

- ^{1} The "Refugee Camp Remix" is a re-recorded hip-hop version of the single.
- ^{2} The "Maurice" Remixes contain additional re-recorded vocals (ad-libs) by Beyoncé, arranged by Maurice Joshua.

== Charts ==
=== Weekly charts ===
Weekly chart performance
Chart (1999–2000)	Peak position
Australia (ARIA)	26
Belgium (Ultratop 50 Flanders)	24
Belgium (Ultratop 50 Wallonia)	32
Europe (European Hot 100 Singles)	30
France (SNEP)	57
Germany (GfK)	20
Netherlands (Dutch Top 40)	4
Netherlands (Single Top 100)	6
Scotland Singles (OCC)	21
Sweden (Sverigetopplistan)	29
Switzerland (Schweizer Hitparade)	60
UK Singles (OCC)	9
UK Hip Hop/R&B (OCC)	2
US Billboard Hot 100	33
US Hot R&B/Hip-Hop Songs (Billboard)	15
US Rhythmic Airplay (Billboard)	6

=== Year-end charts ===
Annual chart rankings
Chart (1999)	Position
Netherlands (Dutch Top 40)	52
Netherlands (Single Top 100)	96
UK Singles (OCC)	168
UK Urban (Music Week)	10
US Hot R&B/Hip-Hop Singles & Tracks (Billboard)	81
US Rhythmic Top 40 (Billboard)	65

== Certifications ==
Certifications and sales
Region	Certification	Certified units/sales
United Kingdom (BPI)	Silver	200,000^{‡}
^{‡} Sales+streaming figures based on certification alone.

== Release history ==
Release dates and formats
Region	Date	Format(s)	Label(s)	Ref.
Japan	July 7, 1999	Maxi CD	SME	
United States	September 7, 1999	Rhythmic contemporary radio; urban adult contemporary radio; urban contemporary radio	Columbia	
Germany	October 5, 1999	Maxi CD	Sony Music	
United Kingdom	October 18, 1999	Cassette; two maxi CDs	Columbia	
France	December 20, 1999	Maxi CD	Sony Music	
France	March 7, 2000	CD	Sony Music	
