= List of UK R&B Albums Chart number ones of 1999 =

The logo of the Official Charts Company, responsible for compiling all of the official music charts in the United Kingdom, including the R&B albums chart.

The UK R&B Chart is a weekly chart, first introduced in October 1994, that ranks the 40 biggest-selling singles and albums that are classified in the R&B genre in the United Kingdom. The chart is compiled by the Official Charts Company, and is based on sales of CDs, downloads, vinyl and other formats over the previous seven days.

The following are the number-one albums of 1999.

== Number-one albums ==
Issue date	Album	Artist(s)	Record label	Ref.
3 January	Big Willie Style	Will Smith	Columbia	
10 January	Big Willie Style	Will Smith	Columbia	
17 January	Street Vibes 2	Various Artists	Warner Bros. Records/Global/Sony TV	
24 January	The Miseducation of Lauryn Hill	Lauryn Hill	Ruffhouse/Columbia	
31 January	The Miseducation of Lauryn Hill	Lauryn Hill	Ruffhouse/Columbia	
7 February	The Miseducation of Lauryn Hill	Lauryn Hill	Ruffhouse/Columbia	
14 February	The Miseducation of Lauryn Hill	Lauryn Hill	Ruffhouse/Columbia	
21 February	The Miseducation of Lauryn Hill	Lauryn Hill	Ruffhouse/Columbia	
28 February	The Miseducation of Lauryn Hill	Lauryn Hill	Ruffhouse/Columbia	
7 March	The Miseducation of Lauryn Hill	Lauryn Hill	Ruffhouse/Columbia	
14 March	The Miseducation of Lauryn Hill	Lauryn Hill	Ruffhouse/Columbia	
21 March	The Miseducation of Lauryn Hill	Lauryn Hill	Ruffhouse/Columbia	
28 March	The Miseducation of Lauryn Hill	Lauryn Hill	Ruffhouse/Columbia	
4 April	The Miseducation of Lauryn Hill	Lauryn Hill	Ruffhouse/Columbia	
11 April	The Miseducation of Lauryn Hill	Lauryn Hill	Ruffhouse/Columbia	
18 April	The Slim Shady LP	Eminem	Aftermath/Interscope/Web	
25 April	FanMail	TLC	LaFace/Arista	
2 May	FanMail	TLC	LaFace/Arista	
9 May	FanMail	TLC	LaFace/Arista	
16 May	FanMail	TLC	LaFace/Arista	
23 May	FanMail	TLC	LaFace/Arista	
30 May	The Miseducation of Lauryn Hill	Lauryn Hill	Ruffhouse/Columbia	
6 June	Street Vibes 3	Various Artists	Warner Bros./Global/Sony TV	
13 June	Street Vibes 3	Various Artists	Warner Bros./Global/Sony TV	
20 June	Synkronized	Jamiroquai	Sony Soho Square	
27 June	Synkronized	Jamiroquai	Sony Soho Square	
4 July	Synkronized	Jamiroquai	Sony Soho Square	
11 July	Synkronized	Jamiroquai	Sony Soho Square	
18 July	My Love Is Your Love	Whitney Houston	Arista	
25 July	My Love Is Your Love	Whitney Houston	Arista	
1 August	The Writing's on the Wall	Destiny's Child	Columbia	
8 August	My Love Is Your Love	Whitney Houston	Arista	
15 August	My Love Is Your Love	Whitney Houston	Arista	
22 August	Mary	Mary J. Blige	MCA	
29 August	Forever	Puff Daddy	Bad Boy/Arista	
5 September	FanMail	TLC	LaFace/Arista	
12 September	FanMail	TLC	LaFace/Arista	
19 September	Nexus	Another Level	BMG	
26 September	On How Life Is	Macy Gray	Epic	
3 October	My Love Is Your Love	Whitney Houston	Arista	
10 October	On How Life Is	Macy Gray	Epic	
17 October	On How Life Is	Macy Gray	Epic	
24 October	On How Life Is	Macy Gray	Epic	
31 October	On How Life Is	Macy Gray	Epic	
7 November	On How Life Is	Macy Gray	Epic	
14 November	On How Life Is	Macy Gray	Epic	
21 November	On How Life Is	Macy Gray	Epic	
28 November	On How Life Is	Macy Gray	Epic	
5 December	On How Life Is	Macy Gray	Epic	
12 December	On How Life Is	Macy Gray	Epic	
19 December	On How Life Is	Macy Gray	Epic	
26 December	On How Life Is	Macy Gray	Epic	

== See also ==
- List of UK Albums Chart number ones of 1999
