= Bills, Bills, Bills =

1999 single by Destiny's Child

Single by Destiny's Child

from the album The Writing's on the Wall
- B-side: "Bug a Boo" (snippet); "So Good" (snippet); "Now That She's Gone" (snippet)
- Released: May 31, 1999
- Recorded: December 1998
- Studio: Digital Services (Houston, Texas); DARP (Atlanta, Georgia)
- Genre: R&B
- Length: 4:15
- Label: Columbia
- Songwriters: Kevin Briggs; Kandi; Beyoncé Knowles; LeToya Luckett; Kelly Rowland
- Producer: Kevin "She'kspere" Briggs

Destiny's Child singles chronology
"She's Gone" (1998)	"Bills, Bills, Bills" (1999)	"Bug a Boo" (1999)

Music video
- "Bills, Bills, Bills" on YouTube

"Bills, Bills, Bills" is a song by American girl group Destiny's Child from their second studio album, The Writing's on the Wall (1999). It was written by Beyoncé Knowles, LeToya Luckett, Kelly Rowland, Kandi Burruss, and Kevin "She'kspere" Briggs and produced by the latter. The song was released as the lead single from The Writing's on the Wall on May 31, 1999, by Columbia Records.

"Bills, Bills, Bills" became Destiny's Child's first number-one single on the US Billboard Hot 100. Internationally, it reached the top 10 in Belgium, Canada, Iceland, the Netherlands, and the United Kingdom. Critically acclaimed, the song was nominated for two Grammy Awards in 2000 – Best R&B Performance by a Duo or Group with Vocals and Best R&B Song.

The accompanying music video for "Bills, Bills, Bills", directed by Darren Grant, was filmed in a beauty salon as a tribute to Beyoncé's mother Tina Knowles. In 2021, the song resurged in popularity on streaming platforms, as well as TikTok, where it became the most popular "comeback" track in the United States and the United Kingdom that year.

== Background and composition ==
"Bills, Bills, Bills" is one of the five tracks that Destiny's Child worked with Kandi Burruss and Kevin "She'kspere" Briggs on their sophomore album that would help create their signature sound. Burruss stated that the idea for the song came to them when they were in a store and Briggs began beat-boxing the beat in his head. Burruss also claimed that the lyrics, specifically the verses for the song, were inspired by personal dating experiences she had. The group members expanded on writing lyrics for the song after the concept was presented to them.

Musically, the song is a sassy, playful, and jittery R&B track with slinky instrumentation led by harpsichord-synthesizers. The track is described to have a quirky melody and descriptive lyrics that draw attention to listeners because of the story the group members are singing. Band member LeToya Luckett elaborated on the song: "It's about a relationship. The guy's treating the girl well in the beginning, but then later on down the line, he starts maxing out her credit cards buying her gifts with her own money. Being real trifling, taking total advantage of her. And [what] we're asking is for him to pay back the bill that he has run up and stop taking advantage of her and start taking responsibilities for his actions."

== Release ==
In the United States, "Bills, Bills, Bills" was serviced to urban and rhythmic contemporary radio stations on May 31, 1999, and June 1, 1999, respectively. The single was then released physically in the United States on CD, maxi-CD, 12-inch vinyl, and cassette. In the United Kingdom, the song was issued on July 12, 1999, as a cassette and two maxi-CDs. Germany and France soon followed with maxi-CDs for the song being released on July 16, and July 26, respectively. The track was later sent to US contemporary hit radio on July 20, 1999.

== Commercial performance ==
"Bills, Bills, Bills" achieved widespread commercial success, becoming Destiny's Child’s biggest single since "No, No, No" (1997). In the United States, it debuted at number 84 on the Billboard Hot 100 and reached number one five weeks later, displacing Jennifer Lopez's debut single "If You Had My Love" from the top spot. It was Destiny's Child's first song to peak at number one on the Billboard Hot 100 and later finished as the ninth-best-selling single of 1999 in the United States. "Bills, Bills, Bills" also reached number one on the Billboard Hot R&B Singles & Tracks chart for nine consecutive weeks and reached the top ten on multiple other Billboard component charts. It was certified Gold on by the Recording Industry Association of America (RIAA) on July 14, 1999 and has since reached Platinum status for shipments of 1.0 million copies.

Internationally, "Bills, Bills, Bills" reached the top thirty on most of the charts on which it appeared. The song attained number one on thenumber one on the Dance/Urban chart in Canada and the UK R&B Singles Charts, becoming the band's second chart topper on both charts. In the United Kingdom, it peaked at number six on the UK Singles Chart and was certified Gold by the British Phonographic Industry (BPI) on November 21, 2014, before achieving Platinum status for shipments exceeding 600,000 units. Additional weekly chart peaks included number eight in Belgium and the Netherlands, and number nine in Canada. The song also reached the top 20 in New Zealand (12), Germany (19), France (20), and Scotland (20), as well as the top 30 in Australia (26), Switzerland (28), and Sweden (30).

== Music video ==
Destiny's Child reunited with director Darren Grant to film the music video for "Bills, Bills, Bills," which featured a futuristic, high-end salon inspired by their early experiences at Headliners, a Houston salon where they had spent time in their youth, and by Tina Knowles, the group's stylist. The video depicts Beyoncé arguing with her boyfriend, intercut with scenes of the members styling clients and performing choreography with salon chairs in light pink outfits. Other sequences show the group in black-and-white zebra-patterned ensembles with men portrayed as "broke" or "good-for-nothing" in the background, followed by a final scene in shiny blue outfits against a wall of glass block windows.

Farrah Franklin, who later was invited to join Destiny's Child, replacing LeToya Luckett and LaTavia Roberson, appeared as an extra in the visuals. Despite label objections to some wardrobe choices, Tina Knowles maintained creative control over most of the styling in "Bills, Bills, Bills." The video made its premiere on music video stations such as BET, MTV, and The Box on the week ending June 13, 1999.

== Track listings ==
US CD and cassette single

1. "Bills, Bills, Bills" (album version) – 4:16
2. "Bug a Boo" (snippet) – 1:18
3. "So Good" (snippet) – 1:03
4. "Now That She's Gone" (snippet) – 1:11

US maxi-CD and 12-inch single, Australian CD single

1. "Bills, Bills, Bills" (album version) – 4:16
2. "Bills, Bills, Bills" (Digital Black-N-Groove club mix) – 7:16
3. "Bills, Bills, Bills" (a cappella) – 4:00
4. "Bills, Bills, Bills" (Maurice's Xclusive Livegig mix) – 7:33
5. "Bills, Bills, Bills" (Maurice's Xclusive dub mix) – 8:04

UK CD1

1. "Bills, Bills, Bills" – 4:16
2. "Bills, Bills, Bills" (I Can't Go for That remix) – 3:57
3. "No, No, No" (Part II—featuring Wyclef Jean) – 3:30

UK CD2

1. "Bills, Bills, Bills" – 4:16
2. "Bills, Bills, Bills" (Maurice's Xclusive Livegig mix) – 7:33
3. "With Me Part II" (featuring Master P) – 4:14

UK cassette single

1. "Bills, Bills, Bills" – 4:16
2. "Bills, Bills, Bills" (I Can't Go for That remix) – 3:57

European CD1

1. "Bills, Bills, Bills" – 4:16
2. "I Can't Go for That" ("Bills, Bills, Bills" remix radio edit) – 3:39

European CD2

1. "Bills, Bills, Bills" – 4:16
2. "I Can't Go for That" ("Bills, Bills, Bills" remix radio edit) – 3:38
3. "I Can't Go for That" ("Bills, Bills, Bills" remix) – 3:57
4. "No, No, No" (Part I) – 4:07
5. "With Me Part II" (featuring Master P) – 4:14

== Credits and personnel ==
Credits are taken from the US CD single liner notes and The Writing's on the Wall album booklet.

Studios

- Recorded at Digital Services (Houston, Texas) and DARP Studios (Atlanta, Georgia)
- Mixed at Larrabee North Studios (Universal City, California)

Personnel

- Kevin "She'kspere" Briggs – writing (as Kevin Briggs), all instruments, midi and sound, production, vocal production, recording
- Kandi Burruss – writing (as Kandi)
- Beyoncé Knowles – writing, vocal production
- LeToya Luckett – writing
- Kelly Rowland – writing
- Michael Calderon – recording
- Vernon Mungo – recording
- Claudine Pontier – recording assistance
- Kevin "KD" Davis – mixing
- Steve Baughman – mixing assistance

== Charts ==
=== Weekly charts ===
Weekly chart performance for "Bills, Bills, Bills"
Chart (1999)	Peak position
Australia (ARIA)	26
Belgium (Ultratop 50 Flanders)	8
Belgium (Ultratop 50 Wallonia)	10
Canada Top Singles (RPM)	7
Canada Dance/Urban (RPM)	1
Canada (Nielsen SoundScan)	9
Canada CHR (Nielsen BDS)	16
Europe (Eurochart Hot 100)	25
France (SNEP)	20
Germany (GfK)	19
Iceland (Íslenski Listinn Topp 40)	7
Ireland (IRMA)	17
Netherlands (Dutch Top 40)	8
Netherlands (Single Top 100)	9
New Zealand (Recorded Music NZ)	12
Scottish Singles Sales (Official Charts)	20
Sweden (Sverigetopplistan)	30
Switzerland (Schweizer Hitparade)	28
UK Singles (Official Charts)	6
UK Hip Hop/R&B (Official Charts)	1
US Billboard Hot 100	1
US Dance Club Songs (Billboard)	13
US Dance Singles Sales (Billboard)	2
US Hot R&B/Hip-Hop Songs (Billboard)	1
US Pop Airplay (Billboard)	26
US Rhythmic Airplay (Billboard)	2

=== Year-end charts ===
Year-end chart performance for "Bills, Bills, Bills"
Chart (1999)	Position
Belgium (Ultratop 50 Flanders)	63
Belgium (Ultratop 50 Wallonia)	47
Canada Top Singles (RPM)	64
Canada Dance/Urban (RPM)	13
Netherlands (Dutch Top 40)	64
Netherlands (Single Top 100)	81
UK Singles (OCC)	111
UK Urban (Music Week)	8
US Billboard Hot 100	21
US Hot R&B/Hip-Hop Singles & Tracks (Billboard)	5
US Mainstream Top 40 (Billboard)	94
US Maxi-Singles Sales (Billboard)	19
US Rhythmic Top 40 (Billboard)	10

== Certifications ==
Certifications for "Bills, Bills, Bills"
Region	Certification	Certified units/sales
Belgium (BRMA)	Gold	25,000^{*}
New Zealand (RMNZ)	Platinum	30,000^{‡}
United Kingdom (BPI)	Platinum	600,000^{‡}
United States (RIAA)	Platinum	1,000,000^{^}
^{*} Sales figures based on certification alone.^{^} Shipments figures based on certification alone.^{‡} Sales+streaming figures based on certification alone.

== Release history ==
Release dates and formats for "Bills, Bills, Bills"
Region	Date	Format(s)	Label(s)	Ref(s).
United States	May 31, 1999	Urban contemporary radio	Columbia	
United States	June 1, 1999	Rhythmic contemporary radio	Columbia	
United States	June 15, 1999	12-inch vinyl; cassette; CD; maxi CD	Columbia	
United Kingdom	July 12, 1999	Cassette; two maxi CDs	Columbia	
Germany	July 16, 1999	Maxi CD	Sony Music	
United States	July 20, 1999	Contemporary hit radio	Columbia	
France	July 26, 1999	Maxi CD	Sony Music	
France	October 19, 1999	CD	Sony Music	

== Cover versions ==
Sporty Thievz, the same group that wrote "No Pigeons" as an answer song to TLC's "No Scrubs", wrote a response to "Bills, Bills, Bills" entitled "No Billz (Why, Why, Why)." Sporty Thievz were also featured on "I Can't Go For That", a re-recorded remix of "Bills, Bills, Bills" with new lyrics, produced by the Trackmasters, along with a rapper called Jazz.

In 2015, New York-based rock band They Might Be Giants recorded a cover version for The A.V. Club's A.V. Undercover series, later released on their album Phone Power.

The song was also performed a cappella by the fictional Dalton Academy Warblers group on the American musical television series Glee in the eleventh episode of the second season, entitled The Sue Sylvester Shuffle.

== See also ==
- List of number-one R&B singles of 1999 (U.S.)
- List of Billboard Hot 100 number-one singles of 1999
