= Boulevard of Broken Dreams (TV series) =

- Genre: Documentary
- Developed by: E!
- Composer: Will Orr (sound mixer)
- Country of origin: United States
- Original language: English
- No. of seasons: 1
- No. of episodes: 8

Production
- Executive producer: Suzanne Ross
- Cinematography: Stephen Graham
- Editors: Timothy Kelley; Jon Baty; Wendy Shuey; Lawrence Curtis; Eric B. Shanks
- Running time: 22–24 minutes

Original release
- Network: E! Entertainment Television
- Release: January 22 – March 12, 2007

Boulevard of Broken Dreams is an American documentary series that aired on the E! television network from January 22 to March 12, 2007. The series focuses on stories about celebrities who have struggled with fame, staged major comebacks after falling from grace, or who met untimely ends.

== List of episodes ==
1. Krissy and Niki Taylor/Leif Garrett
2. Destiny's Child/Jonathan Brandis
3. Lauryn Hill/Mitch Hedberg
4. Asia Carrera/Tommy Morrison
5. Chris Penn/Tara Correa-McMullen
6. James Frey/Christine Chubbuck
7. Tom Sizemore/Troy Duffy
8. Glenn Quinn/Lil' Kim

== Niki Taylor lawsuit ==
On January 29, 2007, Niki Taylor filed a federal lawsuit charging E! Entertainment with slander and emotional distress for her profile on Boulevard of Broken Dreams. She alleged the producers promised to promote her successes but instead misrepresented her as a failure. "The first episode," the Complaint stated, "... is a false portrayal of Ms. Taylor as being continually plagued by ill fortune and tragedy." The lawsuit indicates the documentary alarmed a cosmetics company with which she was negotiating to start a cosmetics line.
