= Darren Grant =

American film director (born 1969)

- Born: 1969; Seattle, Washington, U.S
- Occupation: Director
- Years active: 1997–present

Darren Grant is an American television, film and music video director. He has directed over eighty music videos for mostly R&B and hip hop artists. In 2005, Grant directed his debut film Diary of a Mad Black Woman. In 2008, he directed the film Make It Happen starring Mary Elizabeth Winstead.

== Life and career ==
Grant was born and raised in Seattle, Washington and graduated from Sammamish High School in Bellevue, Washington. He later graduated from the California State University, Northridge and began directing music videos and commercials for Destiny's Child, Aaliyah, Brian McKnight, Deborah Cox, Jermaine Dupri and other artists. Grant has been awarded the MTV Video Music Award for Best R&B Video for Destiny Child's video for "Survivor" and the NAACP Image Award for Outstanding Music Video for "Stomp" for Kirk Franklin.

In 2005, Grand made his feature directorial debut with comedy-drama film Diary of a Mad Black Woman written by Tyler Perry. The film received mostly negative reviews from critics, but was commercially successful, grossing $50.6 million in North America against a $5.5 million budget. In 2008 he directed dance film Make It Happen. In 2017 he directed action comedy Killing Hasselhoff. In 2021, Grand directed Wendy Williams: The Movie for Lifetime.

On television, Grand directed more than 30 television dramas, include episodes of Saints & Sinners, Supernatural, Suits, Empire, Queen of the South, Wu-Tang: An American Saga, God Friended Me, The Chi, Your Honor and Billions. At the 1st Children's and Family Emmy Awards, Grand received nomination for Outstanding Children's or Family Viewing Series for producing Raising Dion.

== Videography ==
=== 1996 ===
- Alfonzo Hunter - "Weekend Thang"

=== 1997 ===
- Frankie - "If I Had You"
- Dru Hill - "In My Bed (So So Def Remix)"
- Common feat. Chantay Savage - "Reminding Me (of Sef)"
- Brian McKnight feat. Mase - "You Should Be Mine"
- Aaliyah - "The One I Gave My Heart To"
- Kirk Franklin & God's Property - "Stomp"
- Sam Salter - "After 12, Before 6"
- Playa - "Don't Stop the Music"
- Destiny's Child - "No, No, No (part 1)"
- Destiny's Child feat Wyclef Jean - "No, No, No (part 2)"
- Brian McKnight - "Anytime"
- Keystone - "If It Ain’t Love"
- Rampage feat. Billy Lawrence - "Take It To The Streets"
- Rampage feat. 702 - "We Getz Down"
- Timbaland & Magoo - "Luv 2 Luv U"
- Jagged Edge - "Gotta Be"
- Ginuwine - "Only When U R Lonely"
- Suga Free - "If U Stay Ready"
- Cru - "Bubblin'"
- Somethin' for the People - "All I Do"
- Ginuwine - "Holler"

=== 1998 ===
- Big Pun feat. Joe - "Still Not A Player"
- 98 Degrees - "Was It Something I Didn't Say"
- Brian McKnight - "Hold Me"
- Destiny's Child feat. Jermaine Dupri- "With Me (part 1)"
- SWV - "Rain"
- TQ - "Westside"
- Deborah Cox - "Nobody's Supposed to Be Here"
- Kenny Lattimore - "Days Like This"
- Uncle Sam - "Baby You Are"
- Xscape - "My Little Secret"
- Tevin Campbell - "Another Way"
- Jermaine Dupri Feat. Jay-Z - "Money Ain’t a Thang"
- Cardan Feat. Jermaine Dupri - "Jam On It"
- Big Pun - "You Came Up"
- Jermaine Dupri Feat. Keith Sweat And "The R.O.C" - Going Home With Me

=== 1999 ===
- Boyz II Men - "I Will Get There"
- Destiny's Child - "Bills, Bills, Bills"
- Monica - "Street Symphony"
- Jordan Knight - "Give It to You"
- Jordan Knight - "I Could Never Take the Place of Your Man"
- Destiny's Child - "Bug a Boo" (version 1)
- Tamar Braxton feat. Jermaine Dupri & Amil - "Get None"
- Chante Moore - "Chante Got A Man"
- Coko - "Sunshine"
- Memphis Bleek - "Memphis Bleek Is"
- Harlem World - "I Really Like It"
- Raekwon - "Live From New York"
- Jermaine Dupri Feat. Da Brat & The R.O.C. - "It’s Nothin"

=== 2000 ===
- 702 – "Gotta Leave"
- Mary Mary – "Shackles (Praise You)"
- Lucy Pearl – "Dance Tonight"
- Ideal feat. Lil' Mo – "Whatever"
- Boyz II Men – "Pass You By"
- Amil featuring Beyoncé – "I Got That"
- Next – "Beauty Queen"
- Boyz II Men – "Thank You in Advance"

=== 2001 ===
- Craig David – "Fill Me In" (USA version)
- Jewel – "Standing Still"
- 3LW – "Playas Gon' Play"
- Destiny's Child – "Survivor"
- Destiny's Child featuring Da Brat – "Survivor (Remix)"
- The Corrs – "All the Love in the World"
- De La Soul – "Baby Phat"
- Lina – "It's Alright"
- Juvenile - "Set It Off"

=== 2002 ===
- Jaheim featuring Next – "Anything"
- Samantha Mumba – "I'm Right Here"
- Jaheim – "Fabulous"
- Trina feat. Ludacris – "B R Right"
- Aaliyah – "Miss You"
- Tank Feat. Mannie Fresh and Jazze Pha - "Let Me Live"
- TG4 - "Virginity"
- RL Feat. Erick Sermon - Got Me A Model

=== 2003 ===
- Jaheim – "Put That Woman First"
- Heather Headley – "I Wish I Wasn't"
- Gang Starr featuring Jadakiss – "Rite Where U Stand"
- Mýa – "Fallen"
- Jaheim - "Backtight"

=== 2004 ===
- Nicole Wray - "If I Was Your Girlfriend"
- Glenn Lewis feat. Kardinal Offishall - "Back for More"
- Tamia - "Questions"

=== 2005 ===
- India.Arie - "Purify Me"
- Jaheim featuring Jadakiss - "Everytime I Think of Her"
- Howie Day - "She Says"
- Kirk Franklin - "Looking For You"

=== 2006 ===
- Tamia - "Can’t Get Enough"

=== 2007 ===
- Vanessa Hudgens - "Say OK" (Version 2)

=== 2011 ===
- Mary Mary - "Survive"

=== 2012 ===
- Mary Mary - "Go Get It"
- Cody Simpson - "So Listen"

== Filmography ==
=== Films ===
- Diary of a Mad Black Woman (2005)
- Make It Happen (2008)
- Man-Eater (2014)
- Killing Hasselhoff (2017)

=== Television ===
- Blaze Studios (2012) (TV movie)
- Verses & Flow (2015) (7 episodes)
- Saints & Sinners (2016–17) (10 episodes)
- The Chi (2018–2020) (3 episodes)
- Unsolved: The Murders of Tupac and The Notorious B.I.G. (2018) ("Half the Job")
- Queen of the South (2018–2019) ("La Fuerza" and "Hospitalidad Sureña")
- Supernatural (2018) ("Nightmare Logic")
- God Friended Me (2019) (2 episodes)
- All American (2019) ("m.A.A.d. City")
- Legacies (2019–2021) (3 episodes)
- Empire (2019) ("Never Doubt I Love")
- Scream (2019) (2 episodes)
- The Purge (2019) ("Should I Stay or Should I Go")
- Soundtrack (2019) (2 episodes)
- Barkskins (2020) ("Buttermilk")
- L.A.'s Finest (2020) ("Rafferty and The Gold Dust Twins")
- Wendy Williams: The Movie (2021) (TV Movie)
- Big Sky (2021–2022) (2 episodes)
- Gossip Girl (2021) ("Gossip Girl, Gone")
- Raising Dion (2022) (2 episodes)
- Billions (2022–2023) (3 episodes)
- 61st Street (2022) (2 episodes)
- Reasonable Doubt (2022) ("Guilty Until Proven Innocent")
- Your Honor (2023) (2 episodes)
- Saint X (2023) (2 episodes)
- The Equalizer (2023–2025) (4 episodes)
- Evil (2024) ("How to Grieve")
- Elsbeth (2024) ("Toil and Trouble")
- Tracker (2025-2026) (3 episodes)
- Happy Face (2025) (2 episodes)
- Duster (2025) (4 episodes)
- The Lincoln Lawyer (2026) (2 episodes)
- Marshals (2026) (2 episodes)
- The Drop: A Snowfall Saga (2026) ("Homecoming")
- Line of Fire (2026) ("Cabin Pressure")
