= No, No, No (Destiny's Child song) =

1997 single by Destiny's Child

Single by Destiny's Child featuring Wyclef Jean

from the album Destiny's Child
- B-side: "Second Nature"; "You're the Only One"
- Released: October 27, 1997
- Studio: Chung King (New York City) (Note: Part I); Digital Services (Houston, Texas) (Note: Part II)
- Genre: R&B
- Label: Columbia
- Songwriters: Vincent Herbert; Rob Fusari; Mary Brown; Calvin Gaines; Barry White
- Producers: Vincent Herbert; Rob Fusari; Wyclef Jean; Che Greene; Jerry Duplessis

Destiny's Child singles chronology
"Can't Stop" (1997)	"No, No, No" (1997)	"Just Be Straight with Me" (1998)

Wyclef Jean singles chronology
"Guantanamera" (1997)	"No, No, No" (1997)	"Gone till November" (1997)

Music videos
- "No, No, No (Part 1)" on YouTube; "No, No, No (Part 2)" on YouTube

"No, No, No" is a song recorded by American girl group Destiny's Child for their eponymous debut studio album (1998). It was written by Calvin Gaines, Mary Brown, Rob Fusari and Vincent Herbert, with production helmed by Fusari and Herbert. It was renamed "No, No, No (Part 1)" after musician Wyclef Jean was consulted to produce and appear on a remix of the song. Built around a hard-sliding bassline and sung in a staccato, rhythmic style, featuring co-production from Che Greene and Jerry Duplessis, it was titled "No, No, No (Part 2)".

"No, No, No" was released as Destiny's Child debut single on October 27, 1997, by Columbia Records, with both versions serviced to radio stations and music video networks. In the United States, the song reached number 3 on the US Billboard Hot 100 and was eventually certified Platinum by the Recording Industry Association of America (RIAA). Elsewhere, "No, No, No" reached the Top 10 in the Netherlands, Norway, and the United Kingdom.

Darren Grant directed accompanying music videos for each version of "No, No, No". Part 1 features the group performing at a nightclub stage, while Part 2 begins with a choreographed dance in a large golden room. Destiny's Child performed "No, No, No" on several television shows and award show ceremonies, such as Teen Summit, The Keenen Ivory Wayans Show, and the Soul Train Lady of Soul Awards. It was performed during all of the group's concert tours, and is featured on their remix album This Is the Remix (2002), as well as their compilation albums #1's (2005) and Playlist: The Very Best of Destiny's Child (2012).

== Recording and production ==
"No, No, No" was written by Calvin Gaines, former Abstrac member Mary Brown, Rob Fusari and Vincent Herbert. The original track was based on an idea from and produced by Fusari. Heavily influenced by R&B, he was inspired to start writing "No, No, No" on one of his synthesizers after listening to "Stroke You Up" (1994), written by singer R. Kelly for R&B duo Changing Faces. A few weeks later, Gaines, a songwriter and friend of Fusari's, brought producer and entrepreneur Herbert to Fusari's studio in his mother's basement in Livingston, New Jersey.

Upon listening to several demos, Herbert liked the track and asked for a cassette copy, taking it to Columbia A&R executive Teresa LaBarbera-Whites, who then presented it to Columbia's then-new signees, Destiny's Child, and Beyoncé's parents. That same night, Herbert called Fusari to tell him that LaBarbera-Whites wanted them to record the downtempo song. Mathew and Tina Knowles had insisted that Destiny's Child should at least record it before any release, even though Herbert had originally planned to give the track to Brandy, one of his artists, had they not allowed the group to record the song for their debut album. The next day, Fusari was called into their studio to arrange a production deal. After finishing writing the song with Gaines and Brown, Fusari and Herbert met with the group at the Chung King Studios in Manhattan, New York City to record "No, No, No".

== Remix ==
Upon hearing Fusari's original version, Mathew Knowles envisioned a hip-hop remix that included a rap section. During production of Destiny's Child, the band went on a small promotional tour supporting Fugees rapper Wyclef Jean, prompting Knowles to ask if he could contribute to the song during their Houston stop. Jean agreed but arrived late at the studio on the day of his recording. Facing tight budget constraints and limited studio time before his scheduled departure, Beyoncé improvised, delivering the verses in a rapid-fire, staccato style. Jean approved of this approach, which would become Destiny's Child's signature sound on future records, and the remix was subsequently recorded in that style, with much of her vocals being recorded within an hour.

Jean commissioned his cousin and frequent collaborator Jerry "Wonda" Duplessis, along with Che Greene, to help rework the track, adding rhythmic punch, crashing hi-hats, and staccato snare beats. He saw the remix as reflecting the fast-paced style that Texas rappers were using at the time, in contrast to the slower flows typical of East Coast rap. Both Duplessis and Greene later received co-producer credits on "No, No, No (Part 2)." The remix also incorporated the bleeps and bass from "Strange Games & Things" by The Love Unlimited Orchestra, resulting in original writer Barry White being credited as a songwriter.

== Commercial performance ==
In the United States, "No, No, No" marked a commercial breakthrough for the group. The song was officially sent to urban contemporary radio on October 27, 1997, and debuted at number 69 on the Billboard Hot 100 on November 29, 1997. After its contemporary hit radio release in January 1998, strong airplay and sales propelled the track into the Top 10 of the Billboard Hot 100, where it eventually peaked at number three, becoming the group's first single to reach that position. It went on to spend thirty-five weeks on the chart, making it their longest-charting Hot 100 entry. Within a year of its release, "No, No, No" had sold over 1.3 million copies in the United States, earning a platinum certification from the Recording Industry Association of America (RIAA). The song also achieved significant success on genre-specific charts, reaching number one on the US Hot R&B Singles chart. In late 1998, the song was ranked fourth on the Hot R&B Singles year-end chart, and 12th on the US Billboard Hot 100 year-end chart.

Internationally, "No, No, No" also performed strongly. In the United Kingdom, it debuted at number five on the UK Singles Chart, later earning a Silver certification from the British Phonographic Industry (BPI) for sales exceeding 200,000 copies, while also topping the UK Hip Hop/R&B chart. Elsewhere in Europe, the single enjoyed solid chart runs. In the Netherlands, it peaked at number two on the Single Top 100 and number three on the Dutch Top 40, while in Norway it reached the Top 10, peaking at number six. The song also attained moderate success in Switzerland (number 13), Sweden (number 15), and Germany (number 17). Outside Europe, "No, No, No" performed strongly in Canada, reaching number seven on the Canadian Singles Chart. In New Zealand, "No, No, No" peaked at number 16 on the New Zealand Singles Chart.

== Music videos ==
As with the single, two videos of "No, No, No" were made to promote both versions of the song, directed by Darren Grant and shot in November 1997. The group chose Grant after Beyoncé discovered him while sifting through a collection of music videos that Camille Yorrick at Columbia Records had compiled for them. The cinematography for both videos was overseen by Troy Smith. Both versions were later included in Destiny's Child's video compilation The Platinum's on the Wall (2001). "Part 2" appears on the DualDisc edition of the album #1's (2005), while "Part 1" was released as an enhanced video on the Australian edition of The Writing's on the Wall (1999).

In the video for "Part 1", Destiny's Child perform a choreographed dance at a nightclub. Marques Houston, along with his Immature bandmates Jerome "Romeo" Jones and Kelton "LDB" Kessee, make cameo appearances in the video. The video for "Part 2" features Wyclef Jean. It opens with Jean playing guitar as Destiny's Child performs, followed by a brief exchange highlighting differing views on the track's musical direction. Performance scenes show the group in coordinated black outfits executing synchronized choreography in a gold-colored room alongside four male dancers, intercut with shots of Jean in a separate blue-toned setting. In the final sequence, the interior space transitions into a meadow, where the members appear on large swing sets as Jean plays guitar nearby, with feathers falling in the background.

== Track listings ==
- US CD single
1. "No No No" (Part 2) (featuring Wyclef Jean) – 3:30
2. "No No No" (Part 1) – 3:59
3. "No No No" (Part 2 without rap) – 3:05
- US cassette single
1. "No No No" (Part 2) (featuring Wyclef Jean) – 3:27
2. "No No No" (Part 1)
- US 12-inch single

A1. "No No No" (Part 2) (featuring Wyclef Jean) – 3:30
A2. "No No No" (Part 1) - 4:13
A3. "No No No" (Part 2 without rap) - 3:08
B1. "No No No" (Part 2 a cappella) (featuring Wyclef Jean) - 3:26
B2. "No No No" (Part 2 instrumental) - 3:26
B3. "No No No" (Part 1 instrumental) - 4:14

- European vinyl single

A1. "No No No" (Part 2) (featuring Wyclef Jean) – 3:27
A2. "No No No" (Part 1) – 4:08
A3. "No No No" (Part 2) (no rap) – 3:05
B1. "No No No" (Funki Dred Remix) (featuring Wyclef Jean) – 3:59
B2. "No No No" (Funki Dred Remix) (featuring MCD) – 3:59
B3. "No No No" (Camdino Soul Extended Remix) – 6:31

- Europe CD single
1. "No No No" (Part 2) (featuring Wyclef Jean) – 3:27
2. "No No No" (Part 1) – 4:08
- UK and Europe CD maxi-single
1. "No No No" (Part 2) (featuring Wyclef Jean) – 3:27
2. "No No No" (Part 1) – 4:08
3. "No No No" (Funki Dred Remix) (featuring Wyclef Jean) – 3:59
4. "No No No" (Funki Dred Remix) (featuring MCD) – 3:59
5. "No No No" (Camdino Soul Extended Remix) – 6:31
- UK CD single 1
1. "No No No" (Part 2) (featuring Wyclef Jean) – 3:27
2. "No No No" (Part 1) – 4:08
3. "No No No" (Part 2) (no rap) – 3:05
4. "Second Nature" - 5:09
- UK CD single 2
1. "No No No" (Funki Dred Remix) (featuring Wyclef Jean) – 3:59
2. "No No No" (Funki Dred Remix) (featuring MCD) – 3:59
3. "No No No" (Camdino Soul Extended Remix) – 6:31
4. "You're The Only One" - 3:23

== Charts ==
=== Weekly charts ===
Weekly chart performance for "No, No, No"
Chart (1997–1998)	Peak position
Australia (ARIA)	72
Austria (Ö3 Austria Top 40)	40
Belgium (Ultratip Bubbling Under Flanders)	4
Canada (Nielsen SoundScan)	7
Canada Dance (RPM)	1
Canada Urban (RPM)	3
Europe (Eurochart Hot 100)	15
France (SNEP)	88
Germany (GfK)	17
Netherlands (Dutch Top 40)	3
Netherlands (Single Top 100)	2
New Zealand (Recorded Music NZ)	16
Norway (VG-lista)	6
Scottish Singles Sales (Official Charts)	33
Sweden (Sverigetopplistan)	15
Switzerland (Schweizer Hitparade)	13
UK Singles (Official Charts)	5
UK Hip Hop/R&B (Official Charts)	1
US Billboard Hot 100	3
US Hot R&B/Hip-Hop Songs (Billboard)	1
US Pop Airplay (Billboard)	24
US Rhythmic Airplay (Billboard)	9

=== Year-end charts ===
Year-end chart performance for "No, No, No"
Chart (1998)	Position
Canada Dance (RPM)	34
Canada Urban (RPM)	27
Germany (Media Control)	90
Netherlands (Dutch Top 40)	32
Netherlands (Single Top 100)	37
Norway Spring Period (VG-lista)	20
Sweden (Hitlistan)	74
UK Urban (Music Week)	5
US Billboard Hot 100	12
US Hot R&B Singles (Billboard)	4
US Mainstream Top 40 (Billboard)	69
US Rhythmic Top 40 (Billboard)	15

== Certifications ==
Certifications for "No, No, No"
Region	Certification	Certified units/sales
United Kingdom (BPI)	Silver	200,000^{‡}
United States (RIAA)	Platinum	1,300,000
^{‡} Sales+streaming figures based on certification alone.

== Release history ==
Release dates and formats for "No, No, No"
Region	Date	Format(s)	Label(s)	Ref.
United States	October 27, 1997	Urban contemporary radio	Columbia	
United States	November 11, 1997	12-inch vinyl; cassette; maxi CD	Columbia	
United States	January 20, 1998	Contemporary hit radio	Columbia	
United Kingdom	March 16, 1998	Cassette; two maxi CDs	Columbia	
Germany	April 20, 1998	Maxi CD	Sony Music	
France	June 30, 1998	CD	Sony Music	
