= List of songs produced by Dallas Austin =

This is a list of songs produced by Dallas Austin.

Song or Album title	Artist	Year
== 0–9 ==
"2 Bad"	Michael Jackson	1995
"3D (Intro)"	TLC	2002
"5 Minutes Away"	Natalie Cole	2006
"7 Day Weekend"	Grace Jones	1992
"18 Wheeler"	Pink	2001
== A ==
"A Girl Like That"	N-Toon	2000
"Abandon My Angels"	Rilan	2015
"Addicted to Love feat. Alex242"	Dallas Austin	2010
"Adoramus te Christe"	Joi	1994
"AGENT PROVOCATEUR"	Naz Tokio	2026
"Ain't 2 Proud 2 Beg"	TLC	1992
"Ain't 2 Proud 2 Beg (Dallas' Dirt Mix)"	TLC	1992
"Ain't It Funny"	Heather Headley	2005
"Ain't Nobody"	Monica	1996
"Alcoholic"	Fishbone	1996
"A Little Bit Of Music"	Glasswurk	1990
"A Little Love"	Shab	2025
"A LITTLE TOO LATE"	Dalby	2025
"All About Love"	After 7	1992
"All of the Girls feat. Pitbull"	Cris Cab	2017
"All Of My Love"	A Few Good Men	1995
"All the Girl That I Need"	Richard Lugo	2001
"Always Stylin'"	Shadz of Lingo	1994
"Amoré (Sexo)"	Santana ft. Macy Gray	2002
"Amplified"	Sky Ferreira	Leaked
"And This Christmas"	Dallas Austin, Darlene McCoy	2022
"Anonymous"	Morten	2017
"Astronaut"	Duran Duran	2004
"Automatic"	TLC	1999
"Ask of You (Dallas Austin Remix)"	Raphael Saadiq	1995
"Atlanta Theme ✖️ FIFA World Cup 26"	Dallas Austin	2025
== B ==
"Baby"	Questionmark Asylum	1995
"Babygirl"	Stacie Orrico	2006
"Back When"	Sugababes	2007
"Backyard (Outta The Hood Version)"	Pebbles	1991
"Bada Bing"	Cris Cab	2016
"Ban Da Iggidy"	Illegal	1993
"Been Away"	Q "The Kid" feat. Jermaine Dupri	2002
"Beat and Path"	Follow the Nomad	2014
"Beergut"	Fishbone	1996
"Better Days"	Namie Amuro	2000
"Better days"	Ediblered	2006
"BETTER SAY IT'S ME"	DALiCO, Kaelyn Kastle	2023
"Be With You"	Darlene McCoy	2007
"Black People"	Highland Place Mobsters	1992
"Black People"	Funkadelic	1995
"Blindfolds feat. Naz Tokio"	Rilan	2016
"Blowin' Me Up (With Her Love)"	JC Chasez	2002
"Body Music"	Crystal Waters	1997
"Boys"	Gabriella Cilmi	2010
"Boom"	Richard Lugo	2001
"Boom"	Gwen Stefani	Leaked
"Break Out (House Remix)"	Jussie Smollett, Junior Sanchez, Dallas Austin	2025
"Bring It On"	N' Dea Davenport	1998
"Broke Ass Home"	E Chapo, Dallas Austin	2021
"Built This Way"	Samantha Ronson	2004
"Bumble Bee"	Jyme, Dallas Austin, D Smoke	2023
"Bustas & Haters"	JT Money	2001
== C ==
"Can't Let Go"	Sammie	2000
"Case Of the Fake People"	TLC	1994
"Catalogs of Lost Love (Volume I)"	Highland Place Mobsters	1992
"Children Of The Revolution"	The Dallas Austin Experience	2009
"Chim Chim's Badass Revenge"	Fishbone	1996
”Chocolates and Lies”	Brit Smith	2024
"Christmas Cheer"	The Boys	1988
"City Too Busy To Hate"	Champp	2025
"Close To You"	Derrick Dimitry	1997
"Come on Down"	TLC	1999
"Come Together"	Macy Gray	2003
"Communicate"	TLC	1999
"Contact"	Follow the Nomad	2015
"Contemporary Jeep Music" (executive producer)	Da King & I	1993
"Cool"	Gwen Stefani	2004
"Cool Enough"	Morten	2017
"Crash in the Wreckage"	Rilan	2015
"Creep"	TLC	1994
"Creep (DARP Mix)"	TLC	1994
"Criminal"	Natalie Cole	2006
"’Cross the Room"	Monica	1998
"Cruisin’ (Dallas Austin Remix)"	D’Angelo	1995
"Crying In My Champagne"	Ansley	2025
"Crying When I'm Sober"	Natalie Carr	2024
"Cupid in me"	Nodesha	2003
”Cupid Is Stupid”	Brit Smith	2024
"Curiosity"	Carly Rae Jepsen	2012
== D ==
"Daddy"	Highland Place Mobsters	1992
"Dallas Austin Presents Xmas with D.A.D." (executive producer)	Various Artists	2022
"Dance Around the Room"	Follow the Nomad	2015
"Dank"	JT Money	1999
"Damaged"	TLC	2002
"Danger Zone"	Gwen Stefani	2004
"Day Dreaming"	Natalie Cole	2006
"Dear God"	Fishbone	2000
"Dear John"	Klymaxx	1994
"Depend On Myself"	TLC	1992
"Different Directions"	Angie Stone	2005
"Dirt Road White Girl"	Highland Place Mobsters	1992
"Dirty Mind"	Joi	1996
"Doc Says Dance"	Doc Box & B. Fresh	1990
"Done feat. Rama Duke"	The Dallas Austin Experience	2009
"Don't Fight It"	Shanice	1999
"Don't Let Me Get Me"	Pink	2001
"Don't Make Me Wait"	Eternal	1995
"Don't Pull Out on Me Yet"	TLC	1999
"Don't Say Goodnight (It's Time For Love)"	Natalie Cole	2006
"Don't Stop"	Madonna	1994
"Don't Take It Personal (Just One of Dem Days)"	Monica	1995
"Do You Love Me Like You Say? (Dallas Austin Master Mix)"	Terence Trent D'Arby	1993
"Dream You"	Stacie Orrico	2006
"Dream On Dreamer"	The Brand New Heavies	1994
"Dream On Dreamer (Dallas Austin Remix)"	The Brand New Heavies	1994
"Drive"	Carly Rae Jepsen	2012
"Drive Me, Crazy"	Orville Peck	2020
"Drivin' Me Crazy"	Terence Trent D'Arby	2001
== E ==
"E'En So Lord Jesus"	Joi	1996
"End Of The World"	McFly	2010
"Every Now And Then"	Macy Gray	2003
"Everyone's A Stranger"	Dropsonic	2005
"Everyotherday (Club Mix)"	Or-N-More	1991
"Everyotherday (Hip Hop Mix)"	Or-N-More	1991
"Everything feat. Rex Evans"	Junior Sanchez	2024
"Exasperated"	The Dallas Austin Experience	2008
"Exist for You"	Namie Amuro	2003
"Exposed"	Dayvia	2023
== F ==
"Fables"	Cris Cab	2014
"Faithful"	Hi- Five	1993
"Fatal Lovesick Journey"	Joi	1994
"Fell For Her"	Sammie	2000
"Fiasco"	Toya featuring T.I.	2001
"Find Me"	Joi	1994
"Fishy Pants" (executive producer)	Muzza Chunka	1993
"Fled"	Fishbone	1996
"Fly With U feat. Cassie"	Far East Movement	2012
"Follow the Bassline"	Dallas Austin	2025
"Foolish"	McFly	2010
"Foreign or Boring"	Minus Gravity	2017
"Forever"	Johnny Apollo､ Duce Mino	2021
"For Your Mind (Club Mix)"	Robbie Nevil	1991
"FourFiveSeconds"	Rihanna, Kanye West & Paul McCartney	2015
"Free" (executive producer)	For Real	1996
"Freedom"	Joi	1994
"Freedom (Theme From Panther)"	Aaliyah, Billy Lawrence, Blackgirl, Brenda Russell, Cindy Mizelle, Crystal Waters, Emage, En Vogue, Female, Jade, MC Lyte, Mary J. Blige, N'Dea Davenport, Nefertiti, Patra, Queen Latifah, SWV, Salt 'N' Pepa, TLC, Yo-Yo, Zhané	1995
"Freedom"	Madonna	1997
"Fried All Day feat. George Clinton"	The Dallas Austin Experience	2009
"From the Bottom to the Top" (executive producer)	Sammie	2000
"F**k U Silly"	Cassie feat. Nicki Minaj	Leaked
"F**k With My Mind"	JC Chasez	2006
"F**k With My Mind"	Novel	2012
== G ==
"Get In There"	Johnny Apollo, Duce Mino	2021
"Get It Up"	TLC	1993
"Get Ready"	Anastacia	2004
"Ghetto Superstar"	Joi	1997
"Girl Ain't Mine"	Dane Bowers	2001
"Girlfriend"	Namie Amuro	2000
"Girlfriend's Best Friend"	Vega	1999
"Girls Like That"	Blaque	2002
"Glass House"	Vega	1999
"Glue"	Gabriella Cilmi	2010
"Go"	Tamia	2000
"Gone Be Fine"	Monica ft. Outkast	1998
"Good Lovin'"	Lateasha	1991
"Good Morning Sunshine"	For Real	1996
"Good Time (Dallas Austin Main Mix)"	Cheryl Lynn	1996
"Good To Me"	Darlene McCoy	2007
"Gotta Be You"	Sugababes	2005
"Guardian Angel"	Joyce Irby	1989
== H ==
"Hurts Sometimes"	Joi	1996
"Hat 2 Da Back"	TLC	1992
"Have You Lost Your Fucking Mind"	Nicole Scherzinger	Leaked
"Headless"	Dropsonic	2005
"HEAR IT"	Dalby	2025
"Heart Needs You"	Richard Lugo	2001
"He Said, She Said"	After 7	1992
"Higher feat. Dawn Richard"	Junior Sanchez	2024
"His Story"	TLC	1992
"Hit 'Em Up Style (Oops!)"	Blu Cantrell	2001
"Hittin' Switches"	Vega	1999
"Hold Me"	For Real	1996
"Hollywood"	George Clinton	1993
"Hotel"	Rilan	2015
"Hot Girls In The Bathroom feat. Sy Scott & B Star"	The Dallas Austin Experience	2007
"Hot Girls In The Bathroom feat. Sy Scott & B Star (Cory Enemy Mix)"	The Dallas Austin Experience	2009
"How You Like Me Now"	Frankie Venter	2024
"Your Honesty"	Madonna	2003
"How Can I Get Close To You"	For Real	1996
== I ==
"I Believe"	Glasswurk	1990
"I Believe"	Joi	1996
"I Can Do Too feat. Queen Latifah"	Cole	2000
"I Don't Mind"	Joi	1994
"I Don't Wanna Be Grown Up"	Another Bad Creation	1993
"Iesha"	Another Bad Creation	1990
"I Found Myself"	Ciara	2006
"I Got Guns"	Follow the Nomad	2015
"I'll Be Your Man"	McFly	2010
"I'll Dip"	Aretha Franklin	1998
"I Like Boys"	Brit & Alex	2008
"I Like It"	Sammie	1999
"I Like The Way"	JT Money	2001
"Imma Need My Money"	Johnny Apollo, Duce Mino	2021
"I'm In Need"	Hi Five	1993
"I Miss You (Dallas Austin Remix)"	Darren Hayes	2002
"I'm Okay feat. Colin Munroe"	The Dallas Austin Experience	2009
"I'm Ready (Main Mix)"	Tevin Campbell	1993
"I Need A Woman"	McFly	2010
"I Need More feat. Darlene McCoy"	Junior Sanchez	2024
"Infomation"	Gwen Stefani	Leaked
"Intentions (Downtown Systa Mix)"	Terri & Monica	1993
"Intervention"	Leona Lewis	Leaked
"In Time"	Trijntje Oosterhuis	2012
"I To You"	Namie Amuro	2001
"I Wanna Be Free"	Patti Labelle	2005
"I Wanna Be Where You Are (Dallas Austin Remix) "	Michael Jackson	2009
"I Wanna Love Again"	Natalie Cole	2005
"I Wanna Thank You"	Darlene McCoy	2007
"I Want a Girl Like You"	Joe feat. Jadakiss	2002
"I Want Candy(Here we go)"	Ansley	2025
"I Will Always Love You"	Troop	1990
"I Will Never Change"	Rilan	2015
"If I Can"	Sammie	2000
"If I Could Fly"	Joi	1996
"If I Could Go Back"	RBN	2025
"If I Ever Lose My Faith In You"	Natalie Cole	2006
"If I'm In Luck I Might Just Get Picked Up"	Joi	1996
"If I Was Your Girlfriend"	TLC	1994
"If She Didn't Do feat. Novel"	The Dallas Austin Experience	2009
"If They Knew"	TLC	1999
"If U C Kate"	McFly	2010
"If U Stay"	Highland Place Mobsters	1992
"If You Can't Say No (Dallas Austin Mix)"	Lenny Kravitz	1998
"If We Weren't Who We Were"	Joi	1994
"In Demand"	Texas	2000
"Insane"	Dropsonic	2005
"In the Cube"	Fishbone	1996
"Intro"	For Real	1996
"It Ain't Easy"	Sugababes	2005
"It Bee'z Like That"	Kronic	1993
"It Makes No Difference"	Dropsonic	2005
"It's So Hard to Say Goodbye to Yesterday"	Boyz II Men	1991
"It's The Holidaze"	Westside Connection	2002
== J ==
"Jealous Girl"	Another Bad Creation	1991
"Jesus For A Day"	Macy Gray	2003
"Just Act Like"	Richard Lugo	2001
"Just a Little While"	Janet Jackson	2004
"Just Be Good to Me"	Deborah Cox	1995
"Just Like a Pill"	Pink	2001
== K ==
"Keep It Down"	Kelis	2003
"Keep It Movin' feat. Da BackWudz"	Sammie	2006
"Key 2 Your Heart"	Chris Brown	2012
"Kickin' It"	After 7	1992
"Know What's Up feat. YoungBloodZ"	Blaque	2002
== L ==
"Last Chance, No Breaks" (executive producer)	Jamal	1995
"Las Vegas"	ROC	2023
"Late Nite Slice"	Ansley	2025
"Leave With You"	Dallas Austin, Novel	2021
"Leavin'"	Natalie Cole	2006
"Leavin' for Las Vegas"	Namie Amuro	2000
"L'éclat De Nos Cœurs (Dallas Austin Remix)"	Native	1998
"Left Outside Alone"	Anastacia	2004
"Let 'Em Know"	Alex242 feat. Eve	2011
"Let It Ride"	Sammie	2006
"Let Me Get It"	Vega	1999
"Let's Get Naked"	Highland Place Mobsters	1992
"Let's Straighten It Out"	Monica	1995
"Let's Take A Dip"	A Few Good Men	1995
"Let Down Your Guard"	Madonna	1994
"Liar Liar"	Cris Cab	2013
"LIAR LIAR"	Ansley	2025
"Lie To Me"	DALiCO, Julian Perretta	2021
"Life Is Good feat. Big Gipp"	The Dallas Austin Experience	2009
"Like I Do"	For Real	1996
"Like Ya Use To"	Heather Headley	2002
"Like This and Like That"	Monica	1995
"Lil Charlie"	JT Money	2001
"Lisa Lisa"	N-Toon	2000
"Little One"	Follow the Nomad	2015
"Little Soldiers"	Another Bad Creation	1991
"Live Your Life (Dallas Austin Remix)"	T.I. featuring Rihanna	2008
"Lock N Load"	Da Backwudz	2006
"Lonely Heart"	Boyz II Men	1991
"Love Dont Wait"	Mechie So crazy	2024
"Love... Hate"	Fishbone	1996
"LoVE is ganGGang"	Omari Hardwick,Nova Issy,Dallas Austin,Keyon Harrold	2024
"Love Letter"	Natalie Cole	2006
"Lovesick"	TLC	1999
"Loves Me Not"	Cris Cab	2014
"Lovin' Arms"	Natalie Cole	2006
== M ==
"Mad Flavaz (Dallas Austin Mix)"	Shadz of Lingo	1994
"Magic In Your Eyes"	Joi	1996
"Make It Up"	Morten	2017
"Malik Goes On"	Mr. Malik	1995
"Man With The Child In His Eyes"	Natalie Cole	2006
"Ma Said"	Highland Place Mobsters	1992
"Me"	Richard Lugo	2001
"Melanin Magic feat. Chris Brown"	Remy Ma	2018
"Memories"	Joi	1994
"Mental (So Pay Attention)"	Another Bad Creation	1991
"Message In The Music"	Debra Killings	2003
"Mind Sex"	Novel	2012
"Miss Thang"	Monica	1995
"Miss U Girl"	Hi- Five	1993
"Missing You"	Monica	1996
"Missing You"	Joi	2002
"Misty Blue"	Monica	1998
"Mommie"	Vega	1999
"Moneyango"	Dallas Austin, Junior Sanchez, Naz Tokio	2020
"Moneyango (DALiCO Remix)"	Dallas Austin, Junior Sanchez, Naz Tokio	2021
"Monkey Dick"	Fishbone	1996
"Move On"	Joi	1996
"Moving On"	Dayvia	2023
"More Bounce (in California)"	Soul Kid#1	2003
"Motownphilly"	Boyz II Men	1991
"Mr. D.J."	Joyce Irby	1989
"Must Be The Money"	Deion Sanders	1994
"My Baby Mama (Dallas Austin Fanokes Mix)"	QT	1996
"My Brother's Letter"	Joi	1996
"My Favorite Movie"	Morten	2017
"My Fondest Childhood Memories"	Macy Gray	2003
"My Girl"	Dropsonic	2005
"My Love"	Troop	1989
"My Music"	Troop	1989
"My Own Rich Man"	Ansley	2025
"My Radio"	Deborah Cox	1995
"My World"	Another Bad Creation	1991
== N ==
"N.A.K.E.D."	Highland Place Mobsters	1992
"Never Ending Love"	Funkadelic	2005
"Never Left Georgia"	Johnny Apollo	2024
"Never Shoulda"	Namie Amuro	2000
"Next to You"	Namie Amuro	2000
"N****s and…"	Highland Place Mobsters	1992
"No Better Love"	After 7	1992
"No Dough feat. J.T. Money"	Vega	1999
"No Never Again"	N'Dea Davenport	1998
"No God But You"	Ali & Gipp	2007
"No Smoke"	Klondike Blonde	2018
"Not This Time"	DALiCO, Kaelyn Kastle	2022
"Nu Jack"	Doc Box & B. Fresh	1990
"Numb"	Pink	2001
"Nutmeg"	Fishbone	1996
== O ==
"Obsession"	Sugababes	2005
"Oh, Mother Earth (Embrace)"	N'Dea Davenport	1998
"OH NO"	Dalby	2025
"Old Man"	Natalie Cole	2006
"On And On"	JT Money	1999
"On Da Grind"	JT Money	1999
"One More Chance"	Colin Munroe feat. Mickey Factz	2008
"One More Shot"	Nicole Scherzinger	Leaked
"One of Those Days"	Duran Duran	2004
"One Planet People"	Fishbone	2000
"One Suitcase"	Shab	2025
"Only One"	The Dallas Austin Experience	2009
"On The Real"	Johnny Apollo, Duce Mino	2021
== P ==
"Parents"	Another Bad Creation	1991
"Party Girl"	McFly	2010
"Passed Out feat. Big Gipp"	The Dallas Austin Experience	2009
"Perfect Strange"	Morten	2017
"Permanent Vacation"	DJ Spinz, Johnny Apollo	2025
"Playette"	Vega	1999
"Playground"	Another Bad Creation	1991
"Please Don't Go"	Boyz II Men	1991
"Popular Demand"	E Chapo	2020
"Popular Demand (DALiCO Remix)"	E Chapo	2021
"Posh Life"	Lady Gaga	Leaked
"Possibly Maybe (Dallas Austin Mix)"	Björk	1996
"Pre Nut"	Fishbone	1996
"Psychologically Overcast feat. Busta Rhymes"	Fishbone	1996
"Pull My Hair Out"	Samantha Ronson	2003
"Pulls You Under"	Kate Pierson	2015
"Purify Me"	India Arie	2005
"Push the Button"	Sugababes	2005
"Put 'Em Up"	Namie Amuro	2003
"Playette"	Vega	1999
== Q ==
"Quickie"	TLC	2002
== R ==
"Racks In The Middle (DALiCO Remix)"	Nipsey Hustle	2020
"Rap Ass Nigga"	JT Money	1999
"Ready 2 Wear (Dallas Austin Modernaire Mix)"	Felix Da Housecat	2020
"Reason To Believe"	Lionel Richie	2006
"Really Don't Miss You"	Veronica	1995
"Rideout Chick"	Rehab	2010
"Right On Time"	Madonna	2025
"Ring Da Bell"	Monica	1998
"Riot"	Fishbone	1996
"Rock Star"	Fishbone	1996
"Roll With Me"	Sammie	2006
"Rotten Luck"	Dropsonic	2005
"R U Down"	DALiCO, Madge	2020
"R U Freaky?"	Highland Place Mobsters	1992
== S ==
"Sad Her Day Mourning"	The Dallas Austin Experience	2009
" Sammie" (executive producer)	Sammie	2006
"Sanctuary"	Madonna	1994
"Scream"	DJ Jazzy Jeff & The Fresh Prince	1993
"Secret"	Madonna	1994
"Secrets"	Eternal	1995
"Sentimental"	Deborah Cox	1995
"Serenade"	The Dallas Austin Experience	2009
"SET U FREE"	Dalby	2025
"Sexhibition"	Janet Jackson	2004
"She Ain't Right for You"	Macy Gray	2003
"She's Not My Lover"	Joyce Irby	1989
"She Works Her Body Right"	Glasswurk	1990
"Shiloh"	DALiCO	2020
"Shoulda Been My Girl"	N-Toon	2000
"Shout"	TLC	1999
"Shout It Out"	Too $hort & Bun B	2002
"Shy Guy (Darpe Mix)"	Diana King	1995
"Sick and Tired"	Anastacia	2004
"Sick And Tired"	Monica	2005
"Silly Ho"	TLC	1999
"Skate"	Monica	1995
"Sleepless"	Brit & Alex	2008
"So Blu"	Blu Cantrell	2001
"So in Love"	For Real	1996
"Something 'Bout the Kiss"	Namie Amuro	1999
"Something 'Bout the Kiss (The All Out Mix)"	Namie Amuro	1999
"Sometimes I Miss You So Much (Dallas Austin Remix)"	P.M. Dawn	1995
"Soul"	Joi	1996
"Sourpuss"	Fishbone	1996
"Spain"	Lou	1996
"Speed It Up feat. Lauren Hashian"	Junior Sanchez	2024
"Spiders"	Dropsonic	2005
"Spread My Wings feat. Chilli"	Vega	1999
"Stand"	Joi	1994
"Stand Down"	Lionel Richie	2006
"Stash Spot"	Johnny Apollo, Duce Mino	2021
"Step Outside"	Dayvia	2023
"STFU"	Johnny Apollo	2020
"Still in Love"	Namie Amuro	2000
"Stop Drop Roll"	Ayo & Teo	2021
"Street Symphony"	Monica	1998
"Strobe Light"	Midnight Red	Leaked
"Stuck"	Stacie Orrico	2003
"Stuck (Rhythmic Mix)"	Stacie Orrico	2003
"Stuff Like This"	Sammie	2000
"Sugar Buddy"	Nodesha	2003
"Summer's Gone"	Dropsonic	2005
"Sun Comes Out"	Follow the Nomad	2015
"Sunshine and the Rain"	Joi	1994
"Superwrong"	Texas	2001
"Survival"	Madonna	1994
"Swingin'"	Blu Cantrell	2001
"Sympin'"	Boyz II Men	1991
== T ==
"Take A Dip"	Highland Place Mobsters	1992
"Take Him Back"	Monica	1998
"Take Me There"	McFly	2010
"Taking My Time"	After 7	1992
"Take Our Time"	TLC	1994
"Tatted"	Ari Lennox	2022
"Tattoo"	Chaise	2010
"Tears (Darp Vibe Mix)"	Da King & I	1993
"Techno Pimp"	Joi	2002
"Thank You"	Boyz II Men	1994
"That's My Girl"	Another Bad Creation	1991
"That's the Truth"	McFLY	2010
"T.H.E. (The Hardest Ever)"	will.i.am feat. Mick Jagger and Jennifer Lopez	2011
"The Big Nothing"	Dropsonic	2005
"The Bottom"	Sammie	2000
"The Boy Is Mine"	Brandy and Monica	1998
"The Block Party (Dallas Austin Remix)"	Lisa "Left Eye" Lopes	2001
"The Choice Is Yours"	Paula Abdul	1995
"The DJ Made Me Stay"	Joyriders & Paul Oakenfold feat. CeCe Peniston	2015
"The House That Glass Built"	Glasswurk	1990
"The Kid in You"	Krystal Harris	2002
"The Last Capone"	Highland Place Mobsters	1992
"The More You Do It (The More I Like It Done)"	Natalie Cole	2006
"The Night Moves"	Klymaxx	1994
"The Pendulum Vibe" (executive producer)	Joi	1994
"The Power of Good-bye (Dallas Low End Remix)"	Madonna	1998
"The Stroke (Dallas Austin Remix)"	Billy Squier	1998
"The Untold Truth" (executive producer)	Illegal	1993
"The Way You Love Me"	Dallas Austin, Jurlan Alxndr	2025
"They Don't Care About Us (Dallas Austin Main Mix)"	Michael Jackson	1996
"Things I Collected"	Namie Amuro	2000
"Things I Collected"	Tamia	2005
"Things That Made Me Change"	Macy Gray	2003
"Think of Me"	Namie Amuro	2000
"This Is My Heart"	Boyz II Men	1991
"This Time"	Klymaxx	1994
"This Time Around"	Michael Jackson	1995
"This Time Around" (Dallas Main Extended Mix)	Michael Jackson	1995
"This Song"	McFly	2010
"Throw Down the Roses"	Kate Pierson	2015
"Time"	Anastacia	2004
"Time To Get Smart"	Doc Box & B. Fresh	1990
"Tiny Little Bows"	Carly Rae Jepsen	2012
"Tonite"	A Few Good Men	1995
"Too Many Boys"	Sky Ferreira	Leaked
"Touch Myself"	T-Boz	1996
"Touch The Sky feat. Digital Farm Animals & Dallas Austin"	Cedric Gervais	2017
"Touch the Skyy"	Dallas Austin, Digital Farm Animals	2022
"Toy Box"	Mylene Cruz & The Soul Madonnas	2017
"Treading Water"	Chris Brown	2012
"Trick Me"	Kelis	2003
"Try A Little Tenderness"	Barrio Boyzz	1994
"Try My Love"	Highland Place Mobsters	1992
== U ==
"U Deserve"	Monica	2002
"Ugly"	Sugababes	2005
"Uhh Ahh"	Boyz II Men	1991
"Uh Oh"	Monica	2002
"U In Me"	TLC	1999
"U Know (Dallas Austin Mix)"	Boyz II Men	1995
"Unachievable Standards"	Dalby	2024
"Underneath The Red Moon"	N' Dea Davenport	1998
"Under Pressure"	Boyz II Men	1991
"Understand the Flow"	Illegal	1993
"Under the Christmas Lights"	Dallas Austin, Kaelyn Kastle	2022
"Under The Mess"	LaRon	2012
"Unpretty"	TLC	1999
== V ==
"Van Full Of Pakistans" (executive producer)	Y'all So Stupid	1993
"Virgo Blaktro and the Movie Disco" (executive producer)	Felix da Housecat	2007
== W ==
"Waho by The Hoti"	Rehab	2012
"Waitingonmyhightocome"	The Dallas Austin Experience	2009
"Wake You Up"	Dayvia	2023
"Walk of Shame"	Nikki Williams	Leaked
"Walk This Way"	Sugababes Vs. Girls Aloud	2007
"Walk You Thru"	A Few Good Men	1995
"Want You More"	Duran Duran	2004
"Wasted"	Dallas Austin, Naz Tokio	2020
"Waterfalls (DARP Remix)"	TLC	1995
"Wedding Day"	Dropsonic	2005
"What About Us"	Texas	2005
"What About Your Friends"	TLC	1992
"Whatever It Takes"	Leona Lewis	2007
"What It Ain't (Ghetto Enuff)"	Goodie Mob	1999
"When I See You"	Macy Gray	2003
"When You Die"	Dropsonic	2005
"Where's The Steel"	Shadz of Lingo	1994
"White Men Can't Jump"	Riff	1992
"Whoop De Woo"	TLC	2003
"Will He Ever Love Me Back"	Nodesha	2003
"Will I Stay (Remix) feat. Wale & Dallas Austin"	Colin Munroe	2008
"With You"	Dayvia	2021
"Wood Work" (executive producer)	Da BackWudz	2006
"Worse Than cigarettes"	Samantha Ronson	Leaked
== Y ==
"You Can Touch Me"	Baby Norman	2001
"You People"	Johnny Apollo, Duce Mino	2021
"Your Honesty"	Madonna	2003
"Your Side"	John Forté	2010
"Your Smile"	Eternal	1995

== See also ==
- The Urban Hymnal
