= Sammie discography =

R&B recording artist discography

- Studio albums: 4
- Extended plays: 6
- Singles: 22
- Mixtapes: 5

This is the discography of American singer Sammie.

== Albums ==
=== Studio albums ===
List of studio albums, with selected chart positions, sales figures and certifications
Title	Album details	Peak chart positions		Sales	Certifications
Title	Album details	US	US R&B	Sales	Certifications
From the Bottom to the Top	Released: March 14, 2000; Labels: Capitol, EMI; Formats: Cassette, CD, digital download	29	12	US: 744,000 (Note: Sales as of February 27, 2006.)	RIAA: Gold
Sammie	Released: October 10, 2006; Labels: Rowdy, Motown; Formats: CD, digital download	42	8	US: 120,000+	
Coming of Age	Released: September 15, 2017; Labels: Star Camp, EMPIRE; Formats: CD, digital download	—	—		
Everlasting	Released: March 1, 2019; Labels: Star Camp, EMPIRE; Formats: CD, digital download	—	—		
"—" denotes a recording that did not chart.

=== Extended plays ===
- 2010: It's Time
- 2013: Leigh Bush Project
- 2015: Series – 3187
- 2016: Series – 31872.0
- 2016: I'm Him
- 2018: Series – 31873.0

=== Mixtapes ===
- 2009: Swag & B: Volume 1
- 2010: It's Just A Mixtape
- 2010: It's Just A Mixtape 2
- 2012: Insomnia
- 2016: Indigo

== Singles ==
=== As lead artist ===
List of singles as a lead artist, with selected chart positions and certifications, showing year released and album name
Title	Year	Peak chart positions			Certifications	Album	
Title	Year	US	US R&B	US Rhyth.	Certifications	Album	
"I Like It"	1999	24	8	22	RIAA: Gold	From the Bottom to the Top	
"Crazy Things I Do"	2000	— (Note: "Crazy Things I Do" did not enter the Billboard Hot 100, but peaked at number 15 on the Bubbling Under Hot 100 Singles chart.)	39	33		From the Bottom to the Top	
"Hardball" (with Lil' Bow Wow, Lil Wayne and Lil Zane)	2001	—	77	—		Hardball soundtrack	
"You Should Be My Girl" (featuring Sean P)	2006	— (Note: "You Should Be My Girl" did not enter the Billboard Hot 100, but peaked at number four on the Bubbling Under Hot 100 Singles chart.)	26	—		Sammie	
"Come with Me"	2007	— (Note: "Come with Me" did not enter the Billboard Hot 100, but peaked at number four on the Bubbling Under Hot 100 Singles chart.)	23	—		Sammie	
"Feelin' It"^{1}	2007	—	—	—		Sammie	
"One Way Street"	2008	—	—	—		Non-album singles	
"Put It on My Tab" (featuring Trey Songz)	2010	—	—	—		Non-album singles	
"Put It In" (featuring Blake Kelly)^{1}	2013	—	—	—		Non-album singles	
"Take Me" (as Leigh Bush)	2013	—	—	—		Non-album singles	Leigh Bush Project
"A Night in Forever" (as Leigh Bush)	2014	—	—	—			Leigh Bush Project
"Till It's Over" (featuring P.H.)	2014	—	—	—		Non-album singles	
"C.R.N" (featuring Lloyd Smith)	2014	—	—	—		Non-album singles	
"I'm Him"	2016	—	—	—		I'm Him	
"Impatient"	2016	—	—	—		I'm Him	
"Better"	2017	—	—	—		I'm Him	
"COA"	2017	—	—	—		Coming of Age	
"Too Long"	2017	—	—	—		Coming of Age	
"Show and Tell" (featuring Eric Bellinger)	2017	—	—	—		Coming of Age	
"Expiration Date"	2018	—	—	—		Coming of Age	
"—" denotes a recording that did not chart or was not released in that territory.

^{1} The single was a promotion release only.

=== As featured artist ===
List of singles as a featured artist, with selected chart positions and certifications, showing year released and album name
Title	Year	Peak chart positions									Certifications	Album
Title	Year	US	US R&B	US Rhyth.	AUS	CAN	FRA	IRL	NZ	UK	Certifications	Album
"Kiss Me thru the Phone" (Soulja Boy Tell 'Em featuring Sammie)	2008	3	4	1	16	10	16	11	2	6	ARIA: Gold; BPI: 2× Platinum; RMNZ: 5× Platinum	iSouljaBoyTellem

== Guest appearances ==
Year	Song	Album
2001	"Hardball" (with Bow Wow, Lil' Zane and Lil' Wayne)	Hardball O.S.T.
2008	"Kiss Me Thru the Phone" (Soulja Boy Tell 'Em featuring Sammie)	iSouljaBoyTellem
2009	"Across the Globe" (Fast Life Yungstaz featuring Sammie)	Jamboree

== Music videos ==
Year	Song title	Album	Director(s)
1999	"I Like It"	From the Bottom to the Top	none
2000	"Crazy Thing I Do"	From the Bottom to the Top	none
2001	"Hardball" (with Bow Wow, Lil' Zane and Lil' Wayne)	Hardball O.S.T.	none
2006	"You Should Be My Girl" (featuring Sean P of YoungBloodZ)	Sammie	none
2007	"Come with Me"	Sammie	none
2008	"Kiss Me Thru the Phone" (Soulja Boy Tell 'Em featuring Sammie)	iSouljaBoyTellem	none
2009	"Sky's the Limit"	Swag & B Mixtape: Vol. 1	TheShay West Production
2009	"Mafia Music"	Swag & B Mixtape: Vol. 1	TheShay West Production
