= Amoeba Cleansing Syndrome =

Studio album by Joi
- Released: 1997
- Recorded: 1995
- Genre: Progressive soul
- Label: EMI Records; Freeworld Entertainment
- Producer: Dallas Austin, Colin Wolfe; Organized Noise, Fishbone

Joi chronology
The Pendulum Vibe (1994)	Amoeba Cleansing Syndrome (1997)	Star Kitty's Revenge (2002)

Amoeba Cleansing Syndrome is the second studio album from American R&B singer Joi. The album was set to be released in 1996, under EMI Records and promotional CDs were released to radio stations. EMI soon delayed Amoeba Cleansing Syndrome set for a later release in 1997, for more songs with commercial appeal. By 1997, the album was planned for release, as "Ghetto Superstar" was to be first single. Abruptly, EMI Records was shut down, and the album was shelved.

The producer of the Amoeba album was Dallas Austin, who arranged for funk rock band Fishbone to be the backing band. Dallas's company FreeWorld Records acquired the rights to release the album. FreeWorld Records released two different promotional EPs for radio with a selection of songs from the album. FreeWorld Records went out of business before "Amoeba Cleansing Syndrome" was set to be released. In 2002, the album was made available for purchase on CD or digital format via Joi's official website.

In The New Rolling Stone Album Guide (2004), Rolling Stone journalist Jon Caramanica calls the album both "sensational" and "bizarre".

== Track listing ==
Tracks (1996)

1. "Welcome Amoeba Spirit" – 1:37
2. "Move On" – 5:17
3. "Answering Machine" – 0:24
4. "If I'm In Luck I Might Just Get Picked Up" 4:12
5. "After Show" – 0:17
6. "I Believe" – 4:51
7. "Hurts Sometimes" – 0:18
8. "E'En So Lord Jesus" – 5:58
9. "Soul" – 4:43
10. "My Brother's Letter" – 4:12
11. "Dirty Mind" – 4:45
12. "Fierce" – 0:27
13. "So Tired" – 4:55
14. "If I Could Fly – 5:02
15. "Dandelion Dust" – 5:48

Alternate tracks (1997)

1. "Welcome Amoeba Spirit" – 1:18
2. "Move On" – 5:17
3. "Answering Machine" (Interlude) – 0:24
4. "If I'm Lucky (I Might Just Get Picked Up)" – 4:12
5. "Ghetto Superstar" – 3:40
6. "After Show (Interlude)" – 0:17
7. "Time To Smile" – 4:20
8. "My Brother's Letter" – 4:11
9. "You Turn Me On" (featuring Skreechy Peach of Whild Peach) – 5:08
10. "Hurts Sometimes" – 5:58
11. "E'en So Lord" – 1:27
12. "Soul" – 4:44
13. "It's Over" – 3:38
14. "I Believe" – 4:51
15. "Dirty Mind" – 4:45
16. "Dandelion Dust" – 5:48
17. "If I Could Fly" – 4:46
18. "Copy Cat" – 0:44

Re-released version (2002)

1. "Welcome Amoeba Spirit" – 1:18
2. "Move On" – 5:17
3. "Answering Machine" (Interlude) – 0:24
4. "If I'm Lucky (I Might Just Get Picked Up)" – 4:12
5. "Ghetto Superstar" (featuring Big Gipp of Goodie Mob) – 3:40
6. "After Show (Interlude)" – 0:17
7. "Time to Smile" – 4:20
8. "My Brother's Letter" – 4:11
9. "You Turn Me On" (featuring Skreechy Peach of Whild Peach) – 5:08
10. "Darling (Skit)" – 0:19
11. "Hurts Sometimes" – 5:58
12. "E'en So Lord" – 1:27
13. "Soul" – 4:44
14. "It's Over" – 3:38
15. "I Believe" – 4:51
16. "Dirty Mind" – 4:45
17. "Fierce (Skit)" – 0:22
18. "So Tired" – 4:49
19. "Dandelion Dust" – 5:48
20. "If I Could Fly" – 4:46
21. "Copy Cat" – 0:44
