= List of Volcano Entertainment artists =

The following is a list of bands or artists, past and present, who have had recordings released on the Volcano Entertainment imprint.

Volcano Entertainment began in 1996 as a joint venture with Zoo Entertainment. In 1997, after absorbing Zoo Entertainment and its artists onto the Volcano imprint, it merged with Rowdy Records to become Freeworld Entertainment. That arrangement was short-lived and in early 1998 Freeworld Entertainment was bought by the then independent Zomba Group who re-established the Volcano Entertainment name.

== Artists ==
- 2 Skinnee J's
- 20 Fingers
- 311
- Akinyele
- Gerald Alston
- Artie the One Man Party
- Bicycle
- Box Set
- Big Sister
- James Brown
- John Cafferty And The Beaver Brown Band
- Cake
- David Cassidy
- Dixie Dregs
- Cause & Effect
- Dogstar
- ELO Part II
- Freddie Jackson
- The Freddy Jones Band
- Fiji Mariners Featuring Col. Bruce Hampton
- Galactic
- Leif Garrett
- Gov't Mule
- Great White
- Green Jellÿ
- Jimmy Hall
- Hoodoo Gurus
- Phyllis Hyman
- The Interpreters
- Sonny Landreth
- Little Feat
- Lusk
- Lynyrd Skynyrd
- Ian Moore
- The Nylons
- Odds
- The O'Jays
- Peach GB
- Procol Harum
- Screamin' Cheetah Wheelies
- Billy Joe Shaver
- Size 14
- Skee-Lo
- Survivor
- Matthew Sweet
- Sweet Sable
- Syd Straw
- Lysette Titi
- To Kool Chris (Chris Chudzik)
- Tool
- Ronan Tynan
- Ugly Americans
- Vigilantes Of Love
- "Weird Al" Yankovic
- Widespread Panic
- Young Dubliners

== See also ==
- Volcano Entertainment
- Freeworld Entertainment
- Zoo Entertainment artists
