= It's Time =

It's Time may refer to:

== Politics ==
- It's Time (Australian campaign), a 1972 Australian Labor Party campaign
- It's Time (New Zealand campaign), a 1972 New Zealand Labour Party campaign
- It's Time (GetUp! ad), a 2011 Australian pro-same-sex marriage television ad

== Music ==
=== Albums ===
- It's Time! (Jackie McLean album), or the title song, 1965
- It's Time! (Candi Staton album), 1995
- It's Time (Billy Crawford album), or the title song, 2007
- It's Time (The Guess Who album), 1966
- It's Time (Jimmy D. Lane album), or the title song, 2004
- It's Time (Max Roach album), or the title song, 1962
- It's Time (Michael Bublé album), 2005
- It's Time (Sammie album), 2010
- It's Time (EP), a 2011 EP by Imagine Dragons
- It's Time (Stefanie Sun album), or the title song, 2011
- It's Time, by Bonnie Bramlett, 1975
- It's Time, by Las Cafeteras, 2012
- It's Time, by Linda Eder, 1997

=== Songs ===
- "It's Time" (song), by Imagine Dragons, 2012
- "It's Time", by Big Sean from Hall of Fame, 2013
- "It's Time", by Boyzone from A Different Beat, 1996
- "It's Time", by Elvis Costello from All This Useless Beauty, 1996
- "It's Time", by Lindell Cooley, 2001
- "It's Time", by The Winans featuring Teddy Riley, 1990
- "It's Time", from the Disney album Rhythm of the Pride Lands, 1995

== Other uses ==
- It's Time, the 2012 two-part series finale of Weeds
- In Your House 12: It's Time, a 1996 World Wrestling Federation event
- "It's time!", a catchphrase of American ring announcer Bruce Buffer
- "It's time!", a catchphrase used by American singer Mariah Carey to herald the arrival of Christmastime

== See also ==
- Verb tense usage after the expression it's (high) time
- It's the Time, a 2007 album by Ron Carter
