= Toon Time (album) =

Studio album by N-Toon
- Released: March 21, 2000
- Recorded: 1997–99
- Genre: R&B
- Label: DreamWorks/Warner Bros.
- Producer: Dallas Austin; Christopher "Tricky" Stewart; Cyptron; Indiana Joan; Steve Morales

Singles from Toon Time
- 1. "Shoulda Been My Girl" Released: January 11, 2000; 2. "Ready" Released: April 5, 2000

Toon Time is the only studio album by American R&B group N-Toon. The album was released on March 21, 2000, on the DreamWorks Records label.

== Track list ==
1. "Chuckie's Question (interlude)" (0:19)
2. "A Girl Like That" (4:17)
3. "Whitney (interlude)" (0:14)
4. "Shoulda Been My Girl" (4:04)
5. "Patti (interlude)" (0:15)
6. "Ready" (3:53)
7. "Do U Believe" (4:57)
8. "Ben & Jerry's (interlude)" (0:13)
9. "Stop That!" (3:09)
10. "Now You're All Alone" (4:15)
11. "Happy Father's Day" (6:00)
12. "Dallas (interlude)" (0:09)
13. "N-Trow (Lloyd's interlude)" (2:09)
14. "It's Your Birthday" (2:54)
15. "Chilli (interlude)" (0:12)
16. "Lisa Lisa" (4:26)
17. "Chuckie & Everett (interlude)" (0:16)
18. "Roses R Red" (3:44)
19. "Chuckie's Headphones (interlude)" (0:16)
20. "Crush on You" (4:05)
21. "Girl in the Tree (dialogue)" (1:29)
22. "What About Us?" (5:06)
23. "The Guys Answer (interlude)" (0:15)
24. "Playaz Gotta Dance" (3:19)

== Personnel ==
=== N-Toon ===
- Justin Clark
- Everett Hall
- Lloyd Polite
- Chuckie D Reynolds

=== Additional Personnel ===
- Rick Sheppard
- Steve Morales (various instruments)
- Tomi Martin (acoustic guitar)
- Derek Scott (guitar)
- John Harris (piano, background vocals)
- David Seigel (keyboards)
- Alvin Speights (bass, drums)
- C. "Tricky" Stewart (programming)
- Debra Killings
- Traci Hale
- Kandi Burruss
- Keithian Sammons
- Jasper Cameron
- Kareem Wilson
- Taufeeq Wright
- Sammie
- Joyce Irby
- God's Gift Of Praise Young People's Choir

=== Producers ===
- Dallas Austin
- Christopher "Tricky" Stewart
- Cyptron
- Indiana Joan
- Steve Morales

=== Engineers ===
- Leslie Braithwaite
- Kevin "KD" Davis
- Mark Goodchild
- John Horesco
- Rico Lumpkins
- Andrew Lyn
- Carlton Lynn
- James Majors
- Keith Morrison
- Claudine Pontier
- Brian Smith
- Alvin Speights
- Brian "B-Luv" Thomas
