= Toon Time =

Toon Time may refer to:

- Toon Time (TV series)
- Toon Time, DVD of Max Fleischer colour classics
- Toon Time (album)
