= Tennessee Slim Is the Bomb =

Tennessee Slim Is The Bomb

Studio album by Joi
- Released: March 28, 2006
- Recorded: 2004–2005
- Genre: R&B
- Label: Joilicious
- Producer: Raphael Saadiq; Joi; Battlecat; Kelvin Wooten; Marlon Cox; Rob Bacon; Kool Ace; Mannie Fresh

Joi chronology
Star Kitty's Revenge (2002)	Tennessee Slim Is The Bomb (2006)

Singles from Tennessee Slim Is the Bomb
- 1. "I'm So Famous" Released: October 24, 2005 July 11, 2006 (re-release); 2. "Dance with Yesterday" Released: June 26, 2006; 3. "Another Rocket" Released: November 13, 2007

Professional ratings
Review scores
Source	Rating
Vibe Magazine	4/5 stars
Okayplayer	4.5/5 stars
Allhiphop	4/5 stars

Tennessee Slim Is the Bomb is the fourth album by American R&B/rock singer, Joi, and was released independently through Joi's own Joilicious Music Label. The lead single, "I'm So Famous", became an underground hit and later made its way to radio the following year months after the album's release. The album debuted on the Billboard Digital Albums Chart in 2007.

== History ==
After leaving Universal, Joi signed with Raphael Saadiq's Pookie Entertainment label preparing for the release of her 4th album, but due to distribution issues with the boutique label, the album's release was canceled. to avoid having another project shelved, Joi decided to release the project Independently.

In late 2004, Joi developed The Joilicious Music Group and put finishing touches to her album. Later released on March 28, 2006, Tennessee Slim Is the Bomb was originally supposed to be for sale via live shows and her official website, but after first day sales surpassed close to the amount of CDs printed it was made available to retail stores. According to XXL Mag, the album was estimated to have sold over 30,000 copies in the United States and is currently out of print. The first single, "I'm So Famous", was released commercially in late 2006. On July 25, 2006, Joi went on tour in support of the album, the first date was at Atlanta's MJQ.

== Track listing ==
1. "Intro" (featuring Keypsiia Blue Daydreamer & Uncle George) - 2:07
2. "Tennessee Slim Is the Bomb" - 4:15
3. "I'm So Famous" - 4:11
4. "To My Lover's House, I Go" (featuring Kebbi Williams) - 4:42
5. "Another Rocket" - 5:33
6. "Co-Stars" (featuring Whild Peach & Heroine) - 5:34
7. "Dance with Yesterday" - 3:40
8. "Lifetime of Nighttime" - 4:33
9. "Cloud Nine" (featuring Pharcyde) - 3:35
10. "Gravity" - 5:46
11. "Maybe" - 3:31
12. "Say, Say, Li'l Fine Ass Niggah" (featuring Trauma Black, Bun B & Pastor Troy) - 4:40
13. "I Love You Forever, Right Now" (featuring Phil Upchurch & Kebbi Williams) - 5:13
14. "That's the Truth" - 5:37
15. "YHWH, Everlasting" - 2:27

== Unreleased ==
1. "10 Reasons Why" (Feat. Mannie Fresh)
2. "The One"

== Release history ==
Release history for Tennessee Slim Is the Bomb
Region	Date
United States	March 28, 2006
Europe	May 2, 2006
Japan	October 8, 2007

== Charts ==
Chart (2006)	Peak position
US Billboard Digital Albums	97
