= I Like It (Sammie song) =

Single by Sammie featuring N-Toon

from the album From the Bottom to the Top
- Released: November 30, 1999
- Recorded: 1999
- Genre: R&B, teen pop
- Length: 4:10
- Label: Freeworld Entertainment/Capitol
- Songwriters: Dallas Austin, Gary White
- Producer: Dallas Austin (exec.)

Sammie featuring N-Toon singles chronology
"I Like It" (1999)	"Crazy Things I Do" (2000)

"I Like It" is the debut single from American R&B singer Sammie. Written by producer Dallas Austin for his debut studio album, From the Bottom to the Top (2000), the song was released as the album's lead single in late 1999 and certified gold by the RIAA. It peaked at number 8 on the Billboard Hot R&B Singles chart and number 24 on the Billboard Hot 100. Sammie was only twelve years old when he recorded the song, which is regarded as his signature song.

== Music video ==
The video was released in fall 1999. It starts out with Sammie singing inside a locker and then hanging out with friends singing on the school front steps. It then features a dance scene inside Sammie's locker and him playing basketball. Afterwards, it shows a load of girls running as in red light, green light as when Sammie turns around. The video ends with Sammie face-to-face with the girl he was singing about. It features then R&B teen-group "N-Toon" which featured singer Lloyd.

== Format and track listings ==
- CD single
1. "I Like It" - 4:11
2. "I Like It" (Instrumental) - 4:11
3. "The Bottom" - 3:03
4. "The Bottom" (Instrumental) - 3:03
- CD maxi-single
1. "I Like It" - 4:11
2. "I Like It" (Remix) - 4:09
3. "I Like It" (Remix Instrumental) - 4:09
4. "The Bottom" - 3:03
5. Snippets of... "Can't Let Go/Crazy Things I Do/Stuff Like This/Hero" - 5:51

== Personnel ==
Credits for "I Like It" major single releases adapted from AllMusic.

- Dallas Austin – composer, executive producer, producer
- Leslie Brathwaite – mixing
- Sammie Bush – featured artist, primary artist, vocals
- David Gates – A&R direction
- Brian Gardener – mastering
- Ty Hudson – assistant engineer, mixing assistant
- Joyce Irby – co-executive producer
- Mark Goodchild – engineer, mixing assistant
- JT Money – featured artist, vocals, composer
- Debra Killings – background vocals
- Daniel Kresco- mixing assistant
- Andrew Lyn – assistant engineer, engineer
- Carlton Lynn - engineer
- Jason Piske – mixing assistant
- Rick Sheppard – midi & sound design
- Kimberly Smith – A&R coordinator
- Vega – background vocals
- Gary White – composer
- Colin Wolfe – composer, producer

== Charts and certifications ==
=== Weekly charts ===
Chart (1999–2000)	Peak position
US Billboard Hot 100	24
US Hot R&B/Hip-Hop Songs (Billboard)	8
US Rhythmic Airplay (Billboard)	22

=== Year-end charts ===
Chart (2000)	Position
US Billboard Hot 100	91
US Hot R&B/Hip-Hop Songs (Billboard)	34

=== Certifications ===
Region	Certification	Certified units/sales
United States (RIAA)	Gold	600,000
