= Star Kitty's Revenge =

Studio album by Joi
- Released: March 19, 2002
- Recorded: 2000
- Genre: Neo soul
- Label: Universal
- Producer: Raphael Saadiq, Charles Suitt, Bernasky Wall, Kelvin Wooten, Brian Fleming, Joi, Rondal Rucker, Charles Pettaway

Joi chronology
| The Pendulum Vibe (1994) | Star Kitty's Revenge (2002) | Tennessee Slim Is the Bomb (2006) |

Professional ratings
Review scores
| Source | Rating |
|---|---|
| AllMusic | 3/5 stars |
| Blender | 4/5 stars |
| Entertainment Weekly | B+ |
| Rolling Stone | 4/5 stars |
| The Rolling Stone Album Guide | 4/5 stars |
| Spin | 8/10 |
| Vibe | 4/5 stars |
| Yahoo! Music | mixed |

Star Kitty's Revenge is the third studio album by American recording artist Joi, released on March 19, 2002, by Universal Records.

The album received generally positive reviews from music critics upon its release. In The New Rolling Stone Album Guide (2004), Rolling Stone journalist Jon Caramanica writes that the album "reeked of the unique stank of Atlanta's Dungeon Family collective" and that "for all Kitty's raunch, Joi still takes the opportunity to flex her impressive, Betty Davis-style vocals on more traditional material.".

== Track listing ==
1. "Alright, I'm Back" - 0:56
2. "It's Your Life" - 3:36
3. "17" of Snow" - 5:26
4. "Y'All Better Be Glad" - 0:40
5. "Techno Pimp" - 3:48
6. "Crave" - 3:32
7. "Munchies for Your Love" - 2:43
8. "Lick (ft. Sleepy Brown)" - 6:29
9. "What If I Kissed You Right Now?" - 4:47
10. "Why They Do What They Do" - 1:08
11. "Get On" - 3:21
12. "You're a Whore" - 4:08
13. "I'm a Woman" - 3:26
14. "He's Still a Nigga" - 0:40
15. "Nicole" - 5:03
16. "Missing You" - 4:12
17. "Agnus Dei" - 1:15
18. "Jefferson St. Joe" - 4:27
19. "Keypsiia, Age 4" (bonus track) - 1:45

== Charts ==
| Chart (2002) | Peak position |
|---|---|
| US Top Heatseekers (Billboard) | 31 |
| US Top R&B/Hip-Hop Albums (Billboard) | 62 |
