= Freedom (Theme from Panther) =

1995 single by various artists

Single by various artists

from the album Panther: The Original Motion Picture Soundtrack
- Released: April 15, 1995
- Recorded: February 1995
- Genre: R&B
- Length: 4:59
- Label: Mercury
- Songwriters: Joi Gilliam; Dallas Austin; Joseph Kirkland
- Producers: Dallas Austin; Diamond D

"Freedom (Theme from Panther)" is a song originally recorded and written by Joi, for her album The Pendulum Vibe (1994). A cover version of the song was released as a single and theme song for the 1995 film Panther, by Mercury Records. Produced by Dallas Austin and Diamond D, and vocally arranged by Angie Stone, the single brought together some of the era's best-known recording artists, including En Vogue, Aaliyah, Mary J. Blige, Queen Latifah, MC Lyte, and TLC. "Freedom (Theme from Panther)" was recorded immediately following the 1995 American Music Awards. The song honors historical black resistance figures such as Harriet Tubman, Sojourner Truth, Rosa Parks, and Angela Davis.

"Freedom (Theme from Panther)" peaked at number 45 on the Billboard Hot 100. The music video for the song was directed by Antoine Fuqua.

== Track listings ==
CD single

1. "Freedom (Theme from Panther)" (4:30)
2. "Freedom (Theme from Panther)" (rap version) (4:20)
3. "Freedom (Theme from Panther)" (edit) (4:04)

Vinyl single

1. "Freedom (Theme from Panther)" (Diamond D's Crystal mix) (6:06)
2. "Freedom (Theme from Panther)" (The Black Bag mix) (4:30)
3. "Freedom (Theme from Panther)" (Dallas' vocal rap mix) (4:30)
4. "Freedom (Theme from Panther)" (Dallas' Dirty Half Dozen mix) (5:08)
5. "Freedom (Theme from Panther)" (Dallas' Clean Half Dozen mix) (4:20)

== Contributing artists ==
- Aaliyah
- Angie Stone
- Felicia Adams
- May May Ali
- MC Lyte
- Amel Larrieux
- Az-Iz
- Blackgirl
- Mary J. Blige
- Tanya Blount
- Brownstone
- Casserine
- Changing Faces
- Tyler Collins
- N'Dea Davenport
- Da 5 Footaz
- E.V.E. (Ebony Vibe Everlasting)
- Emàge
- En Vogue
- Eshe & Laurneá (of Arrested Development)
- Female
- For Real
- Penny Ford
- Lalah Hathaway
- Jade
- Jamecia
- Jazzyfatnastees
- Queen Latifah
- Billy Lawrence
- Joi
- Brigette McWilliams
- Milira
- Miss Jones
- Cindy Mizelle
- Monica
- Me’Shell NdegéOcello
- Natasha
- Nefertiti
- Patra
- Pebbles
- Pure Soul
- Raja-Nee
- Brenda Russell
- SWV
- Salt-N-Pepa
- Chantay Savage
- Sonja Marie
- Tracie Spencer
- Sweet Sable
- TLC
- Terri & Monica
- Vybe
- Crystal Waters
- Caron Wheeler
- Karyn White
- Vanessa Williams
- Xscape
- Y?N-Vee
- Zhané
