= Come with Me (Sammie song) =

Single by Sammie

from the album Sammie
- Released: January 11, 2007
- Recorded: 2006
- Genre: R&B
- Length: 4:54
- Label: Rowdy; Universal
- Songwriter(s): Sammie; Bryan Michael Cox; Adonis Shropshire
- Producer(s): Bryan Michael Cox

Sammie singles chronology
"You Should Be My Girl" (2006)	"Come with Me" (2007)	"Feelin' It" (2007)

"Come with Me" is a song by singer Sammie released as the second single from his second album, Sammie.

The video premiered on 106 & Park and was inspired by Michael Jackson's music video for "Stranger in Moscow."

== Charts ==
=== Weekly charts ===
Chart (2007)	Peak position
US Bubbling Under Hot 100 Singles (Billboard)	4
US Hot R&B/Hip-Hop Songs (Billboard)	23

=== Year-end charts ===
Chart (2007)	Position
US Hot R&B/Hip-Hop Songs (Billboard)	90
