= Shab (singer) =

Persian-American pop singer|songwriter

SHAB

Background information
- Also known as: SHAB
- Born: Shabnam Kamoii
- Origin: Tehran, Iran
- Genres: Pop Music, Electronic Dance Music
- Occupations: Singer; songwriter; dancer
- Years active: 2019–present
- Label: Shabnam Music LLC
- Publisher: Shabnam Music LLC
- Website: www.shabofficial.com

Shabnam Kamoii, mononymously stylized as SHAB, is a Persian-American pop singer and songwriter. She escaped fundamentalist Iran as a pre-teen, traveled alone as a young teenager to the United States and now creates mainly within the electronic dance music and pop music genres.

Over her career she has had multiple Billboard | Mediabase Top 40 hits, but notably has achieved four U.S. Top 40 consecutive chart appearances with her consecutively-released singles since late 2025.

Known for her high energy and memorable hooks, Shab's music highlights her personal focus upon individual liberty and global women's rights. Having co-composed almost all of her discography, she draws heavily for the lyrical and emotional content of her music from her experiences as a refugee while celebrating the gradual transformation of her psycho-emotional mindset ingrained by her Iranian upbringing in favor of Western concepts of citizenship, womanhood and female identity|esteem.

Shab has also emerged in recent years as a leading and outspoken Persian-American dissident across U.S. & British media in opposition to the current Fundamentalist regime in Iran.

== Early life ==
Shab with family members

Shab's birthday with family in Tehran

Shab was born in Tehran, Iran as the youngest of 13 children by a father who was a senior figure in Iran's petroleum industry during the reign of the late deposed Shah, Mohammad Reza Pahlavi.

After the Iranian Revolution, her royalist family immediately faced extended political persecution by the newly-empowered Fundamentalist regime in Tehran. Consequently, Shab's father died at the age 52 from a heart attack resulting from such institutionalized and abusive targeting of his family. But eight years after confiscation by Iranian authorities of the family's wherewithal, her widowed mother nonetheless was able to arrange for her family to escape Iran.

Following a stopover in Turkey, the remainder of her family incrementally relocated to the United States as political refugees, but during the interim Shab was harbored by a sympathetic boarding elementary school in Kassel, Germany. She was separated from her entire family for more than four years and until her political asylum application was finally approved in the United States, at which time Shab was soon reunited with her family in greater Baltimore, Maryland.

Within two years of arriving in America, Shab learned flawlessly unaccented English while working part-time in restaurants in Towson, Maryland and was able to graduate from both high school and later from Towson University with a Bachelor of Arts degree. Thereafter, she briefly attended the Shepard Broad College Of Law at Nova Southeastern University in Fort Lauderdale, Florida before leaving legal studies and returning to Baltimore, where she worked within her family's businesses.

== Career ==
=== Career beginnings ===
Infinite Love album cover (2020)

Shab (2020)

Shab began creating music in her native Farsi while in Florida attending law school, but did not begin recording until 2018, when she released her first tracks in Farsi (including the Farsi-English single "Love You") under her given name, Shabnam.

During late 2018, she shifted primarily to English-language songwriting and began collaborating with Grammy-winning producer Damon Sharpe, with their initial productions entitled "Down To The Wire" and "Spell On Me" (the latter track being Shab's first co-written with Sharpe and Eric Sanicola). "Spell On Me" went on to chart at Number One on the Global Digital Music Chart and Number Two on the British Commercial Pop Club Chart in the United Kingdom.

Both of these initial songs were included among eight tracks, including five co-written between Shab and Sharpe, on her early 2021 debut English-language album, Infinite Love, released on 12 February 2021 (and including a cover version of Depeche Mode's original composition, "Halo").

=== Music career: 2022–2024 (including Infinite Love) ===
Over 2022 to 2024, Shab issued several more singles co-composed with Sharpe, notably including "Serenity" (with a video featuring English actor Harry Goodwins) "Criss Cross" and "Indestructible," but further released a cover of "Sexual (Li Da Di)" (originally sung by the Dutch pop singer Amber).

During this period, Shab also collaborated with rapper Fat Joe on "Voodoo" (an amalgam of the rhythms from Terror Squad’s "Lean Back" and the lyrics from Shab's "Spell on Me"), which track earned her first career Top 40 hit on the U.S. Rhythmic and Pop charts.

=== Music career: 2025–present (including One Suitcase) ===
One Suitcase album cover

SHAB from her Swerve video shoot (2025)

On 12 February 2025, Shab released her second studio album, One Suitcase, having co-composed all of its tracks while working alongside her longtime songwriting partner Sharpe as well as producers Dallas Austin, RoccStar, Eric Zayne and Remi Rafael. The album was mixed and mastered by Grammy-winning engineer Trevor Muzzy.

The double album of 21 songs was critically-acclaimed, being characterized by Rolling Stone magazine as "a compelling collection of songs that flow seamlessly between upbeat anthems and introspective moments" and by Ireland's HotPress as reflecting "[a] spirit of female liberation through club-ready hits and out-and-out pop songs with an intriguing skeletal undercarriage."

From the One Suitcase album, as singles Shab released the tracks "Swerve," "Afterglow," "Say It With Your Chest," "Dance Til You're Free" (a call to action for women's empowerment in Iran & globally) and "Lipstick." Each of these singles were accompanied official music videos orchestrated by Shab's longtime Creative Co-Directors, video director Eli Sokhn and famed choreographer Richy Jackson, that went into regular rotation at MTV and other video streaming services.

Since the early 2025 release of One Suitcase, Shab has posted four consecutive single releases onto the U.S. Radio Top 40 charts, with "Lipstick" having reached such milestone during late 2025 and thereafter with all of "Skin & Bones" (originally written during 2021 in the aftermath of a catastrophic car crash involving her longtime partner), "It's On You" and "Perfume" ascending to the Top 40 charts during 2026.

== Performance and touring ==
Shab & Music Director Mike Manning in concert (2021)

Shab Euro Tour 2022 T-shirt with venues listed

Shab in concert (2025)

Shab with dancers in concert (2025)

While Shab had Farsi-language appearances prior to 2020, her first English language performance was an October 2021 fundraising benefit concert for the Dallas-based Hope Supply Co. charitable organization. Aside from being her debut English show, this event was also the first time in concert that Shab worked with her own band of musicians (featuring her Music Director, Mike Manning, previously the long-term guitar for pop singer Demi Lovato) as well as delivered a performance featuring commissioned choreography design.

Over 2022–2024, SHAB conducted four international tours: three tours with Anastacia, Boyzlife & JLS (including sold-out performances at The O2 in London, the 3Arena in Dublin, the OVO Hydro in Glasgow, the M&S Bank Arena in Liverpool and the AO Arena in Manchester) as well as a solo summertime 2024 festival tour of Britain.

Her various international tours have included scheduled shows in the United Kingdom, Ireland, the Netherlands, Germany, the Czech Republic, Austria, Sweden, Norway, Denmark, Luxembourg and Belgium.

During late 2025, Shab completed her first U.S. coast-to-coast national tour together with the British band The Wanted, during which she earned a rave Yahoo News review in regard to her final tour stop performance in Manhattan:

"Her performance style combined Jennifer Lopez's show-stopping confidence with Shakira's hypnotic rhythm and fluid grace, every move charged with emotion and intent.... [Shab's] sound and stage presence channeled the golden era of early-2000s pop divas, evoking Christina Aguilera's fire and Britney Spears' Toxic-era edge -- especially during her fierce, flirtatious performances of 'Say It With Your Chest,' 'Sexual,' and 'Lipstick.' The crowd responded in kind, singing, dancing and cheering as if watching a global superstar in the making."

— Viki Waters, BANG Showbiz, Yahoo News (17 October 2025)

== Shabnam Music: her record label ==
SHAB Squad BrainTrust (2026)

Shab is exclusively signed to her own record label, Shabnam Music LLC, which she founded during 2020 and accordingly owns all of her master recordings and intellectual property rights.

The leadership of her SHAB Squad team within her Shabnam Music label has been headed since 2021 by her "BrainTrust" of co-Manager Damon Sharpe, Creative Co-Directors Richy Jackson & Eli Sokhn, Musical Director Mike Manning and Branding & Digital Strategist Donna Valdes.

The Los Angeles & Manhattan offices of the Miller PR public relations firm oversee publicity for her label. Commercial Entertainments PLC in Britain is charged with tour placement and arrangement, while tour & social media management for Shab and her label are provided by DXDTours of Britain. Sync relationships for Shab's catalog are administered by MAKESOUND, a boutique music and audio post-production firm based in Los Angeles.

== Personal life: philanthropy and advocacy ==
Shab with Crown Prince Reza Pahlavi & Princess Noor Pahlavi (2025)

Shab in Jamaican fitness photoshoot for Black Tape Project (2023)

Shab fluently speaks Farsi, German and English as a result of her multi-continental upbringing. She became an American citizen during 1997 and lives primarily in Dallas with her two young children and her partner (who is highly involved in her career).

Shab in leopard print DropTrou offering (2025)

In addition to being a fitness fanatic, Shab's other primary personal interests encompass women's issues, motherhood and fashion design. During 2025, she leveraged her fitness, performance and fashion proclivities to found her own jumpsuit line, DropTrou.

Arising out of her experience with Islamic extremism during her formative years, through her music SHAB stands as an impassioned advocate for women's empowerment both in Iran and globally. A staunch supporter of Crown Prince Reza Pahlavi, Shab has also emerged as a leading Persian-American dissident in opposition to what she labels the "Gangster Regime" of the Shia theocracy in Iran and has repeatedly appeared on U.S. national & local television news for her commentary regarding Iranian socio-political developments.

She actively supports charities echoing her individual values, including Hope Supply Co., a not-for-profit organization in Dallas that serves the needs of north Texas homeless children (with which Shab & her partner are heavily involved, including her 2022 fundraiser concert), and Choose Love, a London-based aid agency serving the needs of refugees internationally (which named SHAB a Global Ambassador during late 2024 and to which she has donated all individual proceeds from sales of the One Suitcase album).

== Discography ==
=== Studio albums ===
Year	Album	Release date	Label	Tracks
2021	Infinite Love	12 Feb 2021	Shabnam Music	8
2025	One Suitcase	12 Feb 2025	Shabnam Music	21

=== Concert album ===
Year	Album	Release date	Label	Tracks
2022	Concert For Hope Supply Co.	28 Jan 2022	Shabnam Music	8

=== Songs ===
==== Infinite Love & singles (2018–2024) ====
Song	Release date	Album	Producer(s)	Songwriter(s)
"Love You"	2018	Single	Gemini	SHAB
"Down to the Wire"	12 Feb 2021	Infinite Love	Damon Sharpe	Damon Sharpe; Eric Sanicola
"Ain't Thinking Bout You"	12 Feb 2021	Infinite Love	Damon Sharpe	Damon Sharpe; Eric Sanicola
"Skin & Bones"	12 Feb 2021	Infinite Love	Damon Sharpe	Damon Sharpe; Eric Sanicola; SHAB
"Music To My Heart"	12 Feb 2021	Infinite Love	Damon Sharpe	Damon Sharpe; Eric Sanicola; SHAB
"Where Do I Go"	12 Feb 2021	Infinite Love	Damon Sharpe	Damon Sharpe; Eric Sanicola; SHAB
"Spell on Me"	12 Feb 2021	Infinite Love	Damon Sharpe	Damon Sharpe; Eric Sanicola; SHAB
"What I Do"	12 Feb 2021	Infinite Love	Damon Sharpe	Damon Sharpe; Eric Sanicola; SHAB
"Halo"	12 Feb 2021	Infinite Love	Damon Sharpe	Martin Gore
"Criss Cross"	10 Jun 2022	Single	Damon Sharpe	Damon Sharpe; SHAB
"Serenity"	29 Jul 2022	Single	Damon Sharpe	Damon Sharpe; SHAB
"Sexual (Li Da Di)"	30 Sep 2022	Single	Damon Sharpe	Billy Steinberg; Amber; Rick Nowels
"Indestructible"	5 May 2023	Single	Damon Sharpe	Damon Sharpe; SHAB
"Voodoo" (with Fat Joe)	11 Aug 2023	Single	Damon Sharpe	Joseph Cartagena; Remy Kioni Smith; Scott Storch; Damon Sharpe; Eric Sanicola; Johnny Riodoso; SHAB

==== One Suitcase (2025) ====
Song	Release date	Album	Producer(s)	Songwriter(s)
"Alchemy"	12 Feb 2025	One Suitcase	Eric Zayne; Damon Sharpe	Eric Zayne; Naz Tokio; Johnny Riodoso; SHAB
"Naked"	12 Feb 2025	One Suitcase	RoccStar; Damon Sharpe	Naz Tokio; Leon Youngblood; Johnny Riodoso; SHAB
"Say It With Your Chest"	12 Feb 2025	One Suitcase	Damon Sharpe; The Arengers	Damon Sharpe; JHart; Taoufik Korriche; SHAB
"Afterglow"	12 Feb 2025	One Suitcase	Damon Sharpe; The Arengers	Damon Sharpe; JHart; Taoufik Korriche; SHAB
"Swerve"	12 Feb 2025	One Suitcase	Damon Sharpe; The Arengers	Damon Sharpe; JHart; Taoufik Korriche; SHAB
"Dirty"	12 Feb 2025	One Suitcase	Damon Sharpe; The Arengers	Damon Sharpe; JHart; Taoufik Korriche; SHAB
"Lipstick"	12 Feb 2025	One Suitcase	Eric Zayne; Damon Sharpe	Eric Zayne; Naz Tokio; Johnny Riodoso; SHAB
"A Little Love"	12 Feb 2025	One Suitcase	Dallas Austin; Damon Sharpe; Corey Enemy	Dallas Austin; Maegan Cottone; Naz Tokio; SHAB
"Woman"	12 Feb 2025	One Suitcase	Eric Zayne; Damon Sharpe; Remington Rafael	Eric Zayne; Naz Tokio; Johnny Riodoso; SHAB
"Dance Til You're Free"	12 Feb 2025	One Suitcase	Damon Sharpe; Eric Sanicola	Damon Sharpe; Eric Sanicola; SHAB
"Santa Maria"	12 Feb 2025	One Suitcase	Eric Zayne; Remington Rafael; Damon Sharpe	Damon Sharpe; Eric Zayne; Naz Tokio; SHAB
"Pull Up"	12 Feb 2025	One Suitcase	Eric Zayne; Damon Sharpe	Eric Zayne; Naz Tokio; Johnny Riodoso; SHAB
"Exotica"	12 Feb 2025	One Suitcase	Eric Zayne; Damon Sharpe; Eric Sanicola	Damon Sharpe; Eric Sanicola; SHAB
"Euphoric"	12 Feb 2025	One Suitcase	Damon Sharpe; Eric Sanicola	Damon Sharpe; Eric Sanicola; SHAB
"Alive"	12 Feb 2025	One Suitcase	Eric Zayne; Damon Sharpe	Eric Zayne; Naz Tokio; Remington Rafael: Johnny Riodoso; SHAB
"Core"	12 Feb 2025	One Suitcase	Damon Sharpe; Eric Sanicola	Damon Sharpe; Eric Sanicola; SHAB
"Soulmate Lover"	12 Feb 2025	One Suitcase	Damon Sharpe; Eric Sanicola	Damon Sharpe; Eric Sanicola; SHAB
"Unfold"	12 Feb 2025	One Suitcase	Damon Sharpe; Eric Sanicola; KNAPPY	Damon Sharpe; Eric Sanicola; Johnny Riodoso; SHAB
"Nostalgic"	12 Feb 2025	One Suitcase	Eric Zayne; Damon Sharpe	Eric Zayne; Naz Tokio; Johnny Riodoso; SHAB
"All I Wanted Was You"	12 Feb 2025	One Suitcase	Eric Zayne; Damon Sharpe	Eric Zayne; Naz Tokio; Johnny Riodoso; SHAB
"One Suitcase"	12 Feb 2025	One Suitcase	Dallas Austin; Damon Sharpe	Dallas Austin; Naz Tokio; SHAB

=== Singles (2025-2026) ===
Title	Release date	Producers	Songwriters
"Santa Baby"	15 Nov 2025	Damon Sharpe	Joan Javits; Phillip Springer
"Skin & Bones VIP"	22 Oct 2025	Damon Sharpe; Eric Sanicola	Damon Sharpe; Eric Sanicola; SHAB
"It's On You" (with Preston Harris)	12 Feb 2026	Damon Sharpe; Valentijn Hoogwerf	Valentijn Hoogwerf; Damon Sharpe; SHAB
"DropTrou"	12 Jun 2026	Eric Zayne; Damon Sharpe	Eric Zayne; Naz Tokio; Johnny Riodoso; SHAB
"Perfume"	26 Jun 2026	Damon Sharpe	Bonnie McKee; JHart; Damon Sharpe; SHAB
"Best Of All Time"	21 Aug 2026	Damon Sharpe	Bonnie McKee; JHart; Damon Sharpe; SHAB
"Catch Me If You Can"	23 Oct 2026	Damon Sharpe	Bonnie McKee; JHart; Damon Sharpe; SHAB

=== Sources ===
- SHAB - Apple Music
- SHAB | Spotify
- SHAB | YouTube
- SHAB | Official music page
