= Wood Work (album) =

Studio album by Da BackWudz
- Released: April 18, 2006
- Genre: Southern hip-hop
- Length: 1:06:26
- Label: Rowdy
- Producer: Dallas Austin (also exec.); Milwaukee Black (also exec.); Aleem Hood; Chris "Hammy" Norman; DJ Toomp; Mr. DJ; Organized Noize; The Execs

Singles from Wood Work
- 1. "You Gonna Love Me" Released: 2004

Professional ratings
Review scores
Source	Rating
AllHipHop	3/5 stars
AllMusic	3.5/5 stars
HipHopDX	2.5/5
IGN	6.3/10
Prefix	3/5
RapReviews	6/10
The Badger Herald	4/5

Wood Work is the only studio album by Decatur-based Southern hip hop duo Da BackWudz. It was released on April 18, 2006, via Rowdy Records. Production was handled by Milwaukee Black and Dallas Austin, both also served as executive producers, as well as Aleem Hood, Chris "Hammy" Norman, DJ Toomp, Mr. DJ, Organized Noize, and The Execs. It features guest appearances from Aleem Hood, BIg Gipp, Bo Hagon, Bud, Caz Clay, George Clinton, Jasper Cameron, Jeff B, Killer Mike, Milwaukee Black, Nas, Sleepy Brown and Slim Thug.

The album debuted at number 94 on the Billboard 200 and number 23 on the Top R&B/Hip-Hop Albums selling over 9,000 copies in its first week. Its lead single, "You Gonna Luv Me", sampled Jennifer Holliday's "And I Am Telling You I'm Not Going".

Wood Work became the duo's final album under 'Da BackWudz' name, as the members left Rowdy Records and by 2007, they teamed up with Heavy Slim and G Wiz to form the 'Labratz' quartet, releasing an album called Atlantis Rising. Along the way, Sho Nuff changed his stage name to Marty McFly, and Big Marс changed his moniker to Aleon Craft.

== Critical reception ==
In the Sun Sentinel, Corbin Moseley praised the diversity of songs on the album, concluding that "Da BackWudz might easily be the rookies of the year in the rap music genre". The Chicago Tribune's David Drake thought Wood Work was "an intelligent debut that is enthusiastic and ambitious". The Atlanta Journal-Constitution's Sonia Murray gave the album a "C" grade, praising the single "I Don't Like the Look of It (Oompa)", as well as Nas's rap on "You Gonna Luv Me (Remix)", but finding the rest of the tracks lacking.

== Track listing ==
No.	Title	Writer(s)	Producer(s)	Length
1.	"Welcome 2 Da Backwudz"	James Emory Redding; Marcus L. Thomas; Darren Jordan; Richard Drake; Desmond Alexander Murray; Thom Bell; William Hart	Milwaukee Black; The Execs	2:51
2.	"You Gonna Luv Me" (featuring Milwaukee Black)	Redding; M. Thomas; Jordan; Tom Eyen; Henry Krieger	Milwaukee Black	3:38
3.	"I Don't Like the Look of It (Oompa)" (featuring Caz Clay)	Redding; M. Thomas; Cortavius Caldwell; Jordan; Drake; D. Murray; Leslie Bricusse; Anthony Newley	Milwaukee Black; The Execs	4:04
4.	"Gettin 2 It" (featuring Killer Mike)	Redding; M. Thomas; Michael Render; Aldrin Davis	DJ Toomp	3:55
5.	"Making Money Counting Hundreds"	Redding; M. Thomas; Jordan; Drake; D. Murray; Bob Marley	Milwaukee Black; The Execs	3:54
6.	"The World Could Be Yours"	Redding; M. Thomas; Jordan; Marvin Gaye	Milwaukee Black	4:19
7.	"Fantastic" (featuring Bohagon and Jeff B)	Redding; M. Thomas; Cedric Deonne Leonard; Jeff Bowden; David Sheats	Mr. DJ	4:47
8.	"I'll Do" (featuring Jasper)	Redding; M. Thomas; Jasper Cameron		3:55
9.	"Wood Grain (Interlude)" (featuring Aleem Hood)	Redding; M. Thomas	Milwaukee Black; Aleem Hood; Chris "Hammy" Norman	1:30
10.	"Whatcha Know 'Bout My Life" (featuring Big Gipp and Bud)	Redding; M. Thomas; Cameron Gipp; Jordan	Milwaukee Black	4:56
11.	"Mama Always Told Me" (featuring Sleepy Brown)	Redding; M. Thomas; Patrick Brown; Rico Wade; Ray Murray	Organized Noize	4:51
12.	"Feelin' Lonely"	Redding; M. Thomas; Jordan	Milwaukee Black	4:42
13.	"Lock N Load"	Redding; M. Thomas; Dallas L. Austin	Dallas Austin	4:15
14.	"Same Song"	Redding; M. Thomas; Jordan; Sade Adu; Stuart Matthewman	Milwaukee Black	4:06
15.	"Smoke N Ride" (featuring George Clinton)	Redding; M. Thomas; George Clinton; Jordan	Milwaukee Black	6:54
16.	"You Gonna Luv Me (Remix)" (featuring Nas and Slim Thug)	Redding; M. Thomas; Nasir Jones; Stayve Jerome Thomas; Jordan; Eyen; Krieger	Milwaukee Black	3:49
Total length:				1:06:26

== Personnel ==
- James "Sho Nuff/Marty McFly" Redding – vocals
- Marcus "Big Marc/Aleon Craft" Thomas – vocals, keyboards (track 9)
- Darren "Milwaukee Black" Jordan – vocals (track 2), keyboards (track 15), producer (tracks: 1–3, 5, 6, 9, 10, 12, 14–16), executive producer
- Cortazius "Caz Clay" Caldewell – vocals (track 3)
- Michael "Killer Mike" Render – vocals (track 4)
- Cedric "Bo Hagon" Leonard – vocals (track 7)
- Jeff Bowden – vocals (track 7)
- Jasper Cameron – vocals & guitar (track 8)
- Elizabeth "Yummy" Bingham – backing vocals (track 8)
- Aleem Hood – vocals & producer (track 9)
- Cameron Gipp – vocals (track 10)
- Bud – vocals (track 10)
- Patrick "Sleepy" Brown – vocals & producer (track 11)
- Trina Mead – backing vocals (track 12)
- George Clinton – vocals (track 15)
- Nasir "Nas" Jones – vocals (track 16)
- Stayve "Slim Thug" Thomas – vocals (track 16)
- DJ Ruckus – scratches (track 1)
- Chris "Hammy" Norman – guitar & producer (track 9)
- Tony Reyes – guitar & bass (track 10)
- Tomi Martin – guitar (track 12)
- Graham Marsh – guitar (track 13)
- DJ Tariq – scratches (track 14)
- Albert André Bowman – keyboards & bass (track 15)
- Richard Drake – producer (tracks: 1, 3, 5)
- Desmond Murray – producer (tracks: 1, 3, 5)
- Aldrin "DJ Toomp" Davis – producer (track 4)
- David "Mr. DJ" Sheats – producer (track 7)
- Ray Murray – producer (track 11)
- Rico Wade – producer (track 11)
- Dallas Austin – producer (track 13), executive producer
- Carlton Lynn – mixing (tracks: 1, 7, 8, 10–13, 15)
- Leslie Brathwaite – mixing (tracks: 1, 10, 12, 14)
- Mark Stephens – mixing (tracks: 2–4, 6, 9, 16)
- Micah Bennett – mixing (track 5)
- Chris Bellman – mastering

== Charts ==
Chart (2006)	Peak position
US Billboard 200	94
US Top R&B/Hip-Hop Albums (Billboard)	23
