= Crazy Things I Do =

2000 single by Sammie

"Crazy Thing I Do"

Single by Sammie

from the album From the Bottom to the Top
- Released: January 4, 2000
- Recorded: 1999
- Genre: R&B
- Length: 3:22
- Label: Capitol
- Songwriters: Traci Hale; Christopher "Tricky" Stewart
- Producer: Tricky

Sammie singles chronology
"I Like It" (1999)	"Crazy Thing I Do" (2000)	"You Should Be My Girl" (2006)

"Crazy Things I Do" was released as the final single from American R&B teen-singer's Sammie's debut album From the Bottom to the Top. The song only achieved minor to moderate success, with peak positions of 39 on the Hot R&B/Hip-Hop Songs chart and 19 on the Rhythmic Top 40 chart.

The music video was released and received primarily limited airplay on BET throughout 2000.

== Chart positions ==
Chart (2000)	Peak position
U.S. Billboard Hot R&B/Hip-Hop Songs	39
U.S. Billboard Rhythmic Top 40	19
