= You Should Be My Girl =

Single by Sammie featuring Sean Paul of YoungBloodZ

from the album Sammie
- Released: June 2006
- Genre: R&B, snap
- Length: 4:01
- Label: Rowdy/Universal
- Songwriters: Sammie, Sean Paul
- Producer: Jazze Pha

Sammie singles chronology
"Crazy Things I Do" (2000)	"You Should Be My Girl" (2006)	"Come with Me" (2007)

"You Should Be My Girl" is a song performed by Sammie, who is signed to Dallas Austin's Rowdy Records. It was first single to be released from his self-titled second album. The song features Sean Paul of The YoungBloodZ. It was produced by Jazze Pha and released in June 2006.

It managed to chart BET's 106 & Park and reached number 2. The video featured Sean P, Lloyd Polite, Teairra Mari, Da BackWudz, Big Boi of Outkast, Jazze Pha and Dallas Austin.

== Charts ==
Chart (2006)	Peak position
U.S. Billboard Bubbling Under Hot 100 Singles	4
U.S. Billboard Hot R&B/Hip-Hop Songs	26
