= Rilan =

American singer

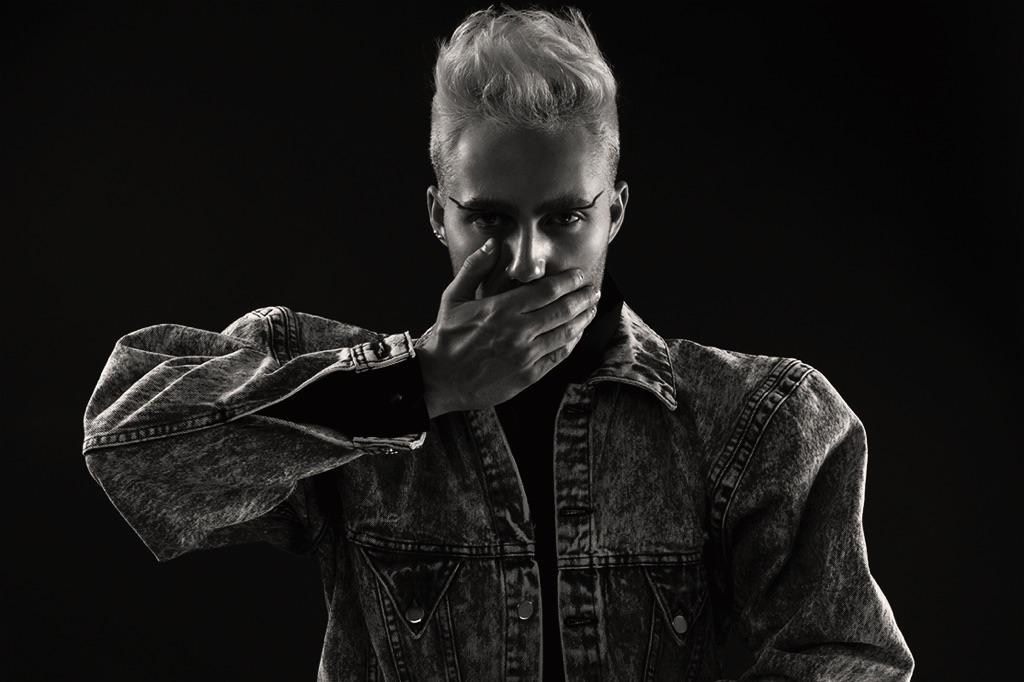

Background information
- Born: Rilan Roppolo; January 5, 1995 (age 31); New Orleans, Louisiana
- Genres: Electropop, pop
- Occupations: Singer; Actor; Dancer; Choreographer
- Years active: 2008 - Present
- Label: Independent
- Website: iamrilan.com

Rilan Roppolo (known as Rilan) is an American singer, songwriter, dancer, and actor. Best known for his role on the final season of Glee, he released his debut EP Chemical in 2015.

Rilan grew up in New Orleans. As a child, he studied ballet and piano, and acted in his first play at 6. He attended Isidore Newman School, and performed in community, high school, and regional theater productions. Influenced by David Bowie, he also sang and wrote songs.

Rilan graduated from high school in 2013 and moved to Los Angeles, Calif. in 2014. Within a year, he was cast as a Warbler on Glee. At the same time, he focused on developing a career in music. He released his first single, "Chemical," in July 2014. The video for the song premiered on Popcrush and as of January 2021 had been viewed on YouTube more than 2.2 million times. In describing the video, Rilan said: "Being from New Orleans, I am inspired by mysticism, old science, alchemy and magic, and although we wanted to give the video modernity to fit the song structure, it has a classic editorial feel mixed with some dark twisted fantasies. The video is what the world looks like when I close my eyes." On Halloween, he released the song and video "RIP." It was followed by "Hotel" in April 2015.

Produced by Dallas Austin, Rilan's debut EP, Chemical, was released in November 2015.

He released the single "Blindfolds" featuring singer Naz Tokio in the spring of 2016, which peaked at #22 on the Billboard Dance Club Songs Chart.

In 2017 Rilan released the single "Moneytalk." His most recent single, "Love or Drugs," was released in March 2019.
