= Sammie (album) =

Studio album by Sammie
- Released: October 10, 2006
- Length: 49:10
- Label: Rowdy
- Producers: Adonis; Dallas Austin; Jasper Cameron; Bryan-Michael Cox; Dre & Vidal; Daron Jones; Jazze Pha; Alonzo "Novel" Stevenson

Sammie chronology
From the Bottom to the Top (2000)	Sammie (2006)	Coming of Age (2014)

Singles from Sammie
- 1. "You Should Be My Girl" Released: June 2006; 2. "Come with Me" Released: January 2007

Sammie is the second studio album by American singer Sammie. It was released by Rowdy Records on October 10, 2006 in the United States. His first album since 2000's From the Bottom to the Top, the singer teamed with producers Bryan Michael Cox, Dallas Austin, Jazze Pha, Daron Jones, Adonis Shropshire and Novel to work on much of the material.

The album garnered a mostly positive reception from music critics, and produced only two singles of which both failed to chart or sell noticeably. Soon considered a commercial failure, Sammie reached the top ten of Billboard's US Top R&B/Hip-Hop Albums chart at number eight, and number forty-two on the Billboard 200, selling over 20,000 copies in its first week. The album was released with as exclusive versions with different bonus track to Target, Best Buy, and Circuit City.

== Production and title ==
After the success of his first album From the Bottom to the Top and a hiatus to finish high school, Sammie entered the recording studios in 2005 to start work on his self-titled second album with reteaming with producer Dallas Austin. Austin signed the then seventeen-year-old to his record label, Rowdy Records. The singer described the album as "soulful" and "passionate."

== Singles ==
The album yielded two singles only: The album's lead single, "You Should Be My Girl", featuring Sean P of Youngbloodz, was a moderate success on the Billboard Hot R&B/Hip-Hop Songs chart peaking at number twenty-six and missing the Billboard Hot 100 peaking at number one hundred-four. The second single, "Come with Me" received the same success peaking at number twenty-three and one hundred-three on Billboard Hot R&B/Hip-Hop Songs and Hot 100. Though "Feelin' It" was considered to be released as the album's third single, it was not officially released.

== Critical reception ==
Professional ratings
Review scores
Source	Rating
About.com	3/5 stars
AllMusic	3.5/5 stars
Okayplayer	4/5 stars
USA Today	3/4 stars

AllMusic editor Andy Kellman rated the album three and a half stars out of five. He found that Samme "does retain some boyishness, yet he never breaks into a Ray J-like whimper when he's feeling desperate. The album does begin to sag toward the middle and putters around after its front-loaded sequence of highlights, which features yet another electro rehash from Jazze Pha and top-notch contributions from Cox and Dre & Vidal. Even some of Sammie's original fans should be pleasantly surprised by this impressive, assured, and fully developed return. Dropping out of music for six of his teenage years was a pretty big risk, but it should pay off." John Book from Okayplayer felt that "it is appealing to hear a singer who has his own distinct voice at a time when it seems everyone is sourced from a clone factory. This album is an introduction to a grown Sammie, and a re-introduction of someone who, with the right music and people behind him, will become one of soul music’s biggest stars for the remainder of the decade and the decade to come."

== Track listing ==
Sammie track listing
No.	Title	Writer(s)	Producer(s)	Length
1.	"Feelin' It"	Sammie Bush; Phalon Alexander; Veronica Bozeman; Jasper Cameron	Jazze Pha	3:27
2.	"I Can't"	Bush; Bryan-Michael Cox; Kendrick Dean; Stephen Kipner; Malcolm Lee; John Lewis Parker; D. Carter	Cox; WyldCard	4:03
3.	"You Should Be My Girl" (featuring Sean P)	Bush; Alexander; Sean Paul Joseph; Lee	Pha	3:54
4.	"What About Your Friend"	Bush; Vidal Davis; Andre Harris; J. Harris; Ryan Toby	Dre & Vidal	3:29
5.	"Choose Me (Prelude)"	Bush; Cameron; M. Sinclair	Cameron	1:13
6.	"Choose Me"	Bush; Cameron; Sinclair; B. Williams	Cameron	4:18
7.	"Mission Impossible"	Bush; Cameron	Cameron	4:11
8.	"Come with Me"	Bush; Cox; Lee; Adonis Shropshire	Cox	4:00
9.	"Back 2 Love"	Bush; Melvin Coleman; Shropshire	Adonis	3:16
10.	"Another Last Chance"	Bush; Lee; Shropshire	Adonis	4:31
11.	"Heavenly"	Bush; Cameron; Alonzo "Novel" Stevenson	Novel	4:18
12.	"Slow"	Bush; Cameron; Stevenson	Novel	4:09
13.	"Let It Ride"	Dallas Austin	Austin	3:02
14.	"My Own Way"	Bush; Cox; Lee	Cox	5:00
15.	"For All You've Done" (Outro)	Bush; Daron Jones; Lee	Jones	1:08
Total length:				49:10

Target bonus track
No.	Title	Writer(s)	Producer(s)	Length
16.	"Keep It Movin'" (featuring Da BackWudz)	Austin; G. Calliste; James Redding; Marcus Thomas	Austin	3:03
17.	"It's Kool"	Bush; Jones	Jones	4:41

Circuit City bonus track
No.	Title	Writer(s)	Producer(s)	Length
16.	"Roll with Me"	Austin; Calliste; Redding; Thomas	Austin	3:24

Best Buy bonus track
No.	Title	Writer(s)	Producer(s)	Length
16.	"For You, the Fans"	Bush; Lee; Ricciano Lumpkins	Ricciano	3:32

== Personnel ==
Performers and musicians

- Alonzo "Novel" Stevenson – keyboards
- Sammie – backing vocals
- Bryan-Michael Cox – programming
- Andre Harris – programming
- Jazze Pha – programming
- Tony Reyes – guitar
- Alonzo "Novel" Stevenson – backing vocals

Technical

- Vocal producer – Vidal Davis, Daron Jones, Alonzo "Novel" Stevenson
- Engineers – Dru Castro, Steve Fisher, Carlton Lynn, Graham Marsh, Alec Newell, Robert Root, Miles Walker
- Mixing – Vincent Dilorenzo, Carlton Lynn, Sam Thomas
- Mixing assistance – Tony Terrebonne, Mike Tsarfati
- A&R – Mike Tsarfati, Kim Smith
- Album coordinator – Candice Childress
- Sound design – Rick Sheppard

== Charts ==
Weekly performance for Sammie
Chart (2006)	Peak position
US Billboard 200	42
US Top R&B/Hip-Hop Albums (Billboard)	8
