= From the Bottom to the Top =

Studio album by Sammie
- Released: March 14, 2000
- Genre: R&B
- Length: 53:47
- Label: Capitol; EMI
- Producer: Dallas Austin (exec.); Ricco Lumpkins; Christopher "Tricky" Stewart; Colin Wolfe

Sammie chronology
From the Bottom to the Top (2000)	Sammie (2006)

Singles from From the Bottom to the Top
- 1. "I Like It" Released: November 30, 1999; 2. "Crazy Things I Do" Released: January 4, 2000

From the Bottom to the Top is the debut studio album by American singer Sammie. It was released by Capitol Records on March 14, 2000, in the United States. Primarily produced by Dallas Austin, with additional production from Colin Wolfe, Ricco Lumpkins, and Tricky Stewart, it peaked at number twenty-seven on the US Billboard 200 and number twenty on the US Billboard Top R&B/Hip-Hop Albums, selling over 744,000 copies to date. It spawned the singles "I Like It" and "Crazy Things I Do".

== Critical reception ==
Professional ratings
Review scores
Source	Rating
AllMusic	3/5 stars
USA Today	3/4 stars

AllMusic senior editor Stephen Thomas Erlewine found that, "at times, [Sammie's] voice does sound a little thin, but for the most part, it's surprisingly soulful and convincing – not as stunning and assured as the young Michael Jackson, but certainly a lot better than most child singers. If he's not yet skillful enough to disguise the sometimes uneven material, that's still forgivable, because the tracks that do work, work really well [...] The end result is the same: From the Bottom to the Top is entertaining, but not always engaging. Still, we have to remember that this is a debut album from a child singer. Judged on that basis, it's charming and, at times, impressive. Sammie does well this time out, and he'll probably do better next time around." Stephanie Smith from Vibe wrote: "Sammie is able to show that despite his lack of facial hair – due to the encumbrance of preadolescence – he can sing. Although this CD is mainly bubble gum pop, it's still fun to listen to and reminisce about that crush in sixth grade or playing kickball after school."

== Track listing ==
No.	Title	Writer(s)	Producer(s)	Length
1.	"The Bottom" (featuring J.T. Money)	Dallas Austin; Jeff "J.T. Money" Thompkins; Colin Wolfe	Austin; Wolfe	3:03
2.	"I Like It"	Austin; Gary White	Austin	4:11
3.	"Can't Let Go" (featuring Lloyd)	Austin	Austin	4:18
4.	"Crazy Things I Do"	Traci Hale; Tricky Stewart	Stewart	3:22
5.	"Stuff Like This"	Austin	Austin	3:54
6.	"When I Grow Up" (Interlude)	Devine Evans	Evans	1:44
7.	"Hero"	Jasper Cameron; Szhachilea "Dymond" Chunn; Ricco Lumpkins	Cameron; Lumpkins	3:42
8.	"Catching Feelings"	Cameron; Lumpkins	Cameron; Lumpkins	3:50
9.	"Count"	Cameron	Cameron	4:21
10.	"If I Can"	Austin; Wolfe	Austin; Wolfe	4:21
11.	"Fell for Her"	Austin; White; Cameron	Austin; White; Cameron	3:39
12.	"Friend Like You"	Chunn; Debra Killings; Lumpkins; White	Killings; White; Lumpkins	4:26
13.	"Do It for You"	Cameron; John Harris; Joyce "Fenderella" Irby	Irby; Cameron	4:55
14.	"I Like It" (Remix)	Austin; Gary White	Austin	4:10

== Personnel ==
Credits for From the Bottom to the Top adapted from Allmusic.

- Dallas Austin – composer, executive producer, producer
- Leslie Brathwaite – mixing
- Jasper Cameron - composer
- Devine Evans - composer, writer
- Kevin "KD" Davis – mixing
- Mark "Exit" Goodchild – engineer
- Traci Hale – composer
- John Horesco IV – editing
- Ty Hudson – assistant, engineer
- Joyce "Fenderella" Irby – composer, engineer
- Debra Killings - composer, vocals (background)
- Jimmy Killings – guitar
- Myra Killings – stylist
- Ricco Lumpkins – composer, producer
- Andrew Lyn – assistant engineer, engineer
- Carlton Lynn – engineer
- Tomi Martin – vocals (background)
- JT Money – featured artist, vocals
- Lloyd Polite – featured artist
- Claudine Pontier – assistant
- Sammie – primary artist, vocals (background)
- Rick Sheppard – MIDI, sound design
- Alvin Speights – bass, mixing
- Christopher "Tricky" Stewart – producer
- Brian "B-Luv" Thomas – engineer
- Jeff Thompkins – composer
- Stephanie Vonarx – assistant engineer
- Gary White – composer
- Colin Wolfe – composer, producer

== Charts ==
Chart (2000)	Peak position
US Billboard 200	46
US Top R&B/Hip-Hop Albums (Billboard)	21

== Certifications ==
Region	Certification	Certified units/sales
United States (RIAA)	Gold	500,000^{^}
^{^} Shipments figures based on certification alone.
