= Darlene McCoy =

Darlene "McCoy" Johnson
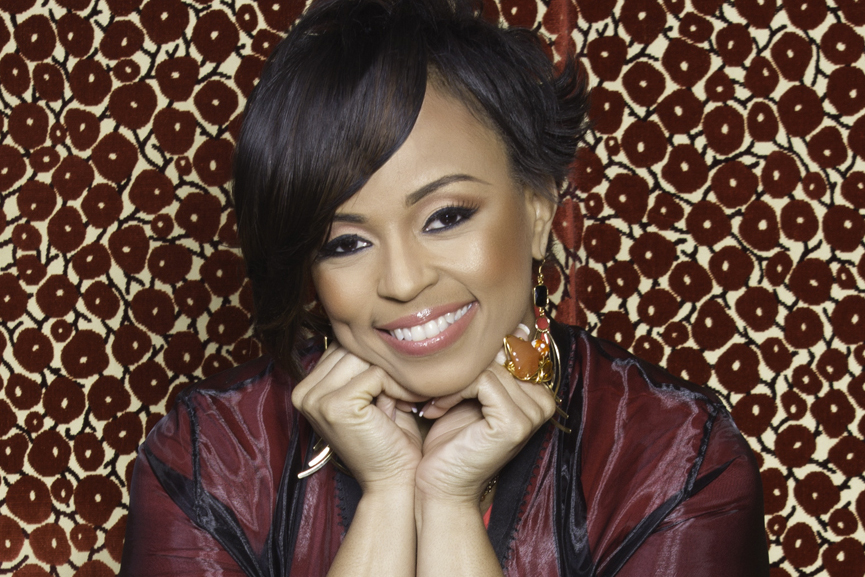
- Darlene McCoy

Background information
- Born: Darlene Jenise Johnson; October 31, 1971 (age 54); Greenville, South Carolina
- Origin: Atlanta, Georgia
- Genres: Gospel; Christian R&B; contemporary R&B; traditional black gospel; urban contemporary gospel
- Occupation: Singer-songwriter
- Instrument: Vocals
- Years active: 2005–present
- Label: EMI Gospel
- Website: iamdarlene.com

Darlene Jenise "McCoy" Johnson-Jackson (born October 31, 1971; née, Johnson), is an American gospel singer, songwriter, author, and radio personality. She started her music career, in 2005, with the release of Fallen in Love single by EMI Gospel. She would release a precursor extended play, in 2007's Fallen in Love, again with EMI Gospel. This will lead into the release of Darlene McCoy later on that year. This album was her breakthrough release on the Billboard magazine charts, which it placed on the Gospel Albums chart. She is the First African American Female to host a nightly syndicated radio show, as she is the host of Nightly Spirit under Reach Media Inc.

== Early life ==
Darlene was born on October 31, 1971, as Darlene Jenise Johnson, in Greenville, South Carolina, the daughter of William R. Johnson and Sadie Sherman Johnson. They raised her in the church from the time she was born, along with her retired military Air Force brother, Reverend Curtis L. Johnson.

== Music career ==
EMI Gospel signed her to a music contract in 2004. Her solo music career started in 2005, with the release of the single "Fallen in Love", and this released on September 13, 2005, by EMI Gospel. This eventually lead to an extended play being released, Fallen in Love, on April 24, 2007, by EMI Gospel, and this was the precursor to her first studio album. This song was included on the soundtrack of Tyler Perry's Diary of a Mad Black Woman. Darlene released, Darlene McCoy, on May 8, 2007, with label EMI Gospel. This album would be her Billboard magazine breakthrough release on the Gospel Albums chart at No. 22. The album got nominated at the 39th GMA Dove Awards for the Urban Album of the Year, while the song, "Simply Because", was nominated for Urban Recorded Song of the Year. Tony Cummings, indicating in a nine out of ten review by Cross Rhythms, realizes, "All in all, outstanding urban gospel." In 2011, she released a single, "I Shall Live And Not Die"on May 17, 2011, and this charted on the Hot Gospel Songs chart put out by Billboard at No. 21.

== Personal life ==
Darlene McCoy has 3 Children: Ambria Boyd, Chandler "Champp" McCoy and Dylan McCoy. She also has one grandson Jax Nasir Scott, and one granddaughter. Darlene is also the first cousin, twice removed of minister/activist Benjamin Mays and comedian/actress Moms Mabley.

In February 2022, Darlene married actor Alphonso A'Qen-Aten Jackson.

== Filmography ==
=== Film ===
Year	Title	Role	Notes
2012	In Sickness and in Health	Eve	TV movie

== Discography ==
=== Studio albums ===
List of studio albums, with selected chart positions
Title	Album details	Peak chart positions
Title	Album details	US Gos
Darlene McCoy	Released: May 8, 2007; Label: EMI Gospel; CD, digital download	22
