= The Interpreters (band) =

American power pop band

- Origin: Philadelphia, Pennsylvania, United States
- Genres: Power pop, alternative rock
- Years active: Freeworld, RCA
- Members: Herschel Gaer (vocals and bass); Patsy Palldino (vocals and guitar); Branko Jakominich (vocals and drums)

The Interpreters were a power pop band formed in Philadelphia in 1996. They were composed of singer and bassist Herschel Gaer, guitarist Patsy (Paul) Palladino and drummer Branko Jakominich.

== History ==
The band was formed in 1996 and signed with Volcano/Freeworld Entertainment, releasing their first EP, In Rememberance of That Fine, Fine Evening, in 1997. The recording was produced by Shel Talmy and Eric Erlandson. Later that year, the band released the full-length album Back in the U.S.S.A. on Freeworld/BMG.

Following Freeworld's demise, a revised version of the record that included the newer track "Shout" was released on RCA Records in 1998. The band performed at that year's Reading Festival.

Gaer continued, relocating to New York, and performed at the 2000 Republican National Convention in Philadelphia, despite claiming not to be Republicans. As depicted in the documentary Last Party 2000, the Interpreters were invited to perform by Donovan Leitch, as part of the ongoing political project started by Robert Downey, and later continued by Robert Downey, Jr., and Philip Seymour Hoffman. Their appearance was harshly criticized and lampooned by Jello Biafra on his album Become the Media. The band suffered derision from the convention appearance, which, combined with inactivity, line-up changes, and the loss of momentum due to the legal morass surrounding the collapse of Freeworld Entertainment and the records' re-release on RCA, who all but ignored its existence, led to the eventual breakup of the band.
