= Joi (singer) =

American singer (born 1971)

- Born: Joi Elaine Gilliam; January 25, 1971 (age 55)
- Genres: R&B; rock; funk; soul; progressive soul
- Occupations: Singer; songwriter; record producer
- Instrument: Vocals
- Years active: 1993–present
- Labels: EMI (1991–95); Rowdy (1995–97); Universal Motown (2000–03); Limp; Pookie Records (2003–05); Joilicious Music LLC. (2005–present)
- Spouse: Big Gipp (m. 1995; div. 2003)
- Website: Official website

Joi Elaine Gilliam (born January 25, 1971), known mononymously as Joi, is an American singer, songwriter, and record producer associated with the Dungeon Family collective based in Atlanta, Georgia, and as such often performs with Outkast, Organized Noize, and Goodie Mob (her ex-husband, Big Gipp, is a member of the latter group). Her signature songs include "Sunshine & the Rain", "Lick", and "Freedom".

== Biography ==
Joi is the daughter of NFL Pittsburgh Steelers quarterback Joe Gilliam and granddaughter of Tennessee State Tigers football coach Joe Gilliam Sr.

== Music career ==
=== The Pendulum Vibe (1994) ===
In 1994, Joi released her debut album, The Pendulum Vibe, on EMI with Dallas Austin as the executive producer. While the lead single "Sunshine & the Rain" received heavy airplay on video outlets such as VH1 and MTV, the single failed to become a hit and album sales were disappointing, selling only 76,000 copies in the U.S. Even though album sales were low, Joi received widespread praise from critics, some calling her the new "Madonna". Madonna herself was so impressed with Pendulum Vibe that she changed the direction of her 1994 album Bedtime Stories. Madonna was also responsible for assisting Joi in becoming the first black model in a major Calvin Klein print ad campaign. While Joi was receiving heavy media attention she released two more singles: "I Found My Niche" and "Freedom". During this time, Joi's personal and musical style was the first to be dubbed as "neo soul".

The track "Freedom" from Pendulum Vibe was later used for the Mario Van Peebles film Panther in a re-record featuring Aaliyah, Mary J. Blige, En Vogue, Me'shell Ndegeocello, TLC, Queen Latifah, Vanessa Williams, SWV, Brownstone and many more.

=== Amoeba Cleansing Syndrome (1997) ===
In 1997, Joi prepared for the release of her second album, Amoeba Cleansing Syndrome on Dallas Austin's FreeWorld label. Joi and creative partner Austin brought in the assistance of Fishbone to be her backing band. The song "I Believe" was originally picked to be the first single, a video, which featured a then pregnant Joi was shot, but weeks before its release EMI wanted more "Radio Friendly" tracks for the album, and the video's release was canceled and the album's release was put on hold. Before returning to the studio, Joi gave birth to a healthy baby girl Keypsiia "Blue-Daydreamer" Gipp and took a short hiatus. After almost a year delay, Joi returned with a new single "Ghetto Superstar" which featured her then husband rapper Big Gipp, the song, written for her father Joe Gilliam, coined the term "Ghetto Superstar". A video was shot and released, it featured both Big Gipp and their 1-year-old daughter Keypsiia. Yet, despite its MTV buzz status, when her label Rowdy/EMI folded, so did the release of the album. Even though the album never saw the light of day commercially, months after its cancellation, the album began circulating due to heavy boot-legging, several media outlets were able to obtain copies of the album, giving the project 4 to 5 Star Reviews, calling it "Ahead of its time". But in spite of the positive feedback received for the album, Joi was disappointed about its cancellation and decided to take a hiatus to take care of her family.

=== Lucy Pearl (2000) ===
In 2000, Joi joined Raphael Saadiq's group, Lucy Pearl, replacing Dawn Robinson (of En Vogue). the group made their first public appearance with Joi on January 25, 2001, on The Tonight Show with Jay Leno performing "You" which was also featured on the Save the Last Dance soundtrack. Even though Joi performed and shot two videos with the group, they never released a follow-up studio album together and the group later disbanded.

=== Star Kitty's Revenge (2002) ===
"Lick" (2002)
Joi's Hit Single From 2002's Star Kitty's Revenge and XXX Soundtrack.

In 2002. Joi released her third album Star Kitty's Revenge, on Universal Records. The lead single "Missing You" was produced by Dallas Austin with whom she had not worked since doing background vocals on TLC's "Silly Ho". While the first single failed to become a hit, the second single "Lick" which featured fellow Dungeon Family member Sleepy Brown was included in the film XXX received a large amount of attention from Andrew Soeder courtesy of the film's soundtrack, with no video and little airplay from radio stations across the country, sales for the single soared becoming Joi's most successful single to date, the song would later be sampled by fellow ATL recording artist Gucci Mane on his 2007 hit "Freaky Gurl". The following year, she was released from Universal after the sales of Star Kitty's Revenge failed to impress label executives. In spite of the widespread attention received from "Lick," the album sold only 101,217 copies in the U.S. according to Nielsen SoundScan.

=== Tennessee Slim Is the Bomb (2006) ===
After leaving Universal, she signed with Raphael Saadiq's Pookie Entertainment label preparing for the release of her fourth album, but due to distribution issues with the boutique label, the album's release was canceled. To avoid having another project shelved, Joi decided to release the project independently.

In late 2004, Joi developed her own independent label "Joilicious Records" and put finishing touches to her album. The album was set to be released in 2005, but was eventually released on March 28, 2006, as her fourth album under the title Tennessee Slim Is the Bomb. The first single, "I'm So Famous", was released commercially in late 2006. A second single "Dance With Yesterday" received a limited release.

=== Collaborations ===
Throughout the years, as a member of Atlanta's famous Dungeon Family, Joi has been featured on tracks by many different artists such as Outkast, Goodie Mob, TLC, Robbie Williams, Big Tymers, George Clinton, Curtis Mayfield, Queen Latifah, Too Short, Fishbone, Jim Crow, Shaquille O'Neal, Joss Stone, Run The Jewels and the D.O.C.

== Discography ==
=== Studio albums ===
- The Pendulum Vibe (1994)
- Amoeba Cleansing Syndrome (1997)
- Star Kitty's Revenge (2002)
- Tennessee Slim Is the Bomb (2006)
- S.I.R. Rebekkah HolyLove (2018)
- 'Tine Wolf Rebellion (2024)

=== Guest appearances ===
- "Down" (with Run the Jewels) on Run the Jewels 3 (2016)
- "Miss Georgia Fornia" (with Big K.R.I.T.) on 4eva Is a Mighty Long Time (2017)
- "Kush" (with Organized Noize and 2 Chainz) on The Art of Organized Noize (2018)

== Singles ==
- "Sunshine & the Rain" (1994)
- "Freedom" (1994)
- "I Found My Niche" (1995)
- "I Believe" (1996)
- "Ghetto Superstar" (1997)
- "Missing You" (2001)
- "Lick" (2002)
- "It's Your Life" (2002)
- "I'm So Famous" (2005)
- "Dance With Yesterday" (2006)
- "Another Rocket" (2007)
- "Kush" (2017)
- "Stare At Me" (2018)
- "No Grey Matter" (2018)
- "It Is Best" (2018)
- "Run" (2024)
- "Hunger" (2025)

== Filmography ==
- (2010) Smiles & Cries
- (2018) Luke Cage season 2 episode "Soul Brother #1"
