= Da BackWudz =

American hip hop group

- Also known as: Labratz
- Origin: Decatur, Georgia
- Genres: Rap
- Years active: 2003–2008
- Label: Rowdy Records
- Past members: Marcus "Big Marc" Thomas, James "Sho Nuff" Redding

Da BackWudz, also known by the name Labratz, was a rap duo from Decatur, Georgia consisting of Marcus "Big Marc" Thomas and James "Sho Nuff" Redding. The duo released one album, Wood Work, in 2006 and the album reached the position of 94 on the Billboard 200. They were signed to Dallas Austin's Rowdy Records and they released their first single, "You Gonna Luv Me", in 2004. Da BackWudz has performed in multiple tours, including BET's 2005 Black College Tour, and MTV's Sucker Free Sunday Tour. Thomas and Redding later renamed themselves Labratz, joined together with Heavy Slim and G Wiz, and released one album, Atlantis Rising, before disbanding.

== Discography ==
=== Albums ===
- Wood Work (2006, Universal/Rowdy Records)
- Atlantis Rising (2007, as Labratz)

=== Singles ===
- "You Gonna Luv Me" (featuring Milwaukee Black)
- "I Don't Like the Look of It" (featuring Caz Clay)
- "The World Could Be Yours"
- "Sexy Lil' Country Chick" (ATL: The Movie Soundtrack)

=== Music videos ===
- "You Gonna Luv Me"
- "I Don't Like the Look Of It (Oompa)"
