= The Pendulum Vibe =

Studio album by Joi
- Released: June 28, 1994
- Recorded: D.A.R.P. Studios, Atlanta
- Genre: Neo soul; R&B; funk; psychedelic soul
- Length: 43:57
- Label: EMI
- Producer: Dallas Austin; Diamond D; Joi; Rondal Rucker; Colin Wolfe

Joi chronology
| The Pendulum Vibe (1994) | Amoeba Cleansing Syndrome (1997) |

Singles from The Pendulum Vibe
- 1. "Sunshine & the Rain" Released: March 1, 1994; 2. "I Found My Niche" Released: August 2, 1994

The Pendulum Vibe is the debut album of American recording artist Joi, released on June 28, 1994, by EMI Records. She recorded the album in three weeks with producer and mentor Dallas Austin at D.A.R.P. Studios in Atlanta. The Pendulum Vibe is a neo soul album that incorporates R&B, funk, and psychedelic soul styles. The songs are about themes of enlightenment, personal freedom, intimate relationships, and womanism.

The album was acclaimed by music critics upon its release, but was overlooked commercially and went out of print. It subsequently attained a cult following among listeners of eclectic R&B music and has since been viewed by critics as a precursor to the neo soul music scene.

== Background ==
Having trained extensively in the arts, Joi dropped out of Tennessee State University and pursued a recording career, all the while writing poetry. She met Atlanta-based songwriter and producer Dallas Austin through a mutual friend while he was recording in Tennessee. Austin, who had achieved success working with artists such as TLC, Boyz II Men, and Another Bad Creation, took her on as his protégée. In 1993, Joi moved to Atlanta and attained a record deal through Austin.

She later said of her experience with Austin and Atlanta's music scene, "He and I ended up clicking musically and it was some crazy, creative times".

== Recording ==
Recording sessions for the album took place at Austin's D.A.R.P. Studios in Atlanta, Georgia. The newly opened studio was the result of his thriving production career at the time. The Pendulum Vibe was produced primarily by Austin, who also played most of the instruments, including bass, drums, and keyboards. He also co-wrote most of the songs with Joi.

Joi also worked with hip hop producer Diamond D, keyboardist Dan Matrazzo, and Shadz of Lingo, an Atlanta-based hip hop group signed to EMI at the time. The group's MC Lingo contributed vocals to "Freedom" and "Fatal Lovesick Journey", and Kolorado played drums. The Pendulum Vibe was recorded live and completed in three weeks.

== Music and lyrics ==
A neo soul album, The Pendulum Vibe features eclectic music that incorporates R&B, funk, and psychedelic soul styles. It also draws on traditional R&B influences, of which The Source writes, "The album is a modern variation on the Stax/Muscle Shoals convocations of yore, where the feel of the record set a mood that extended long after the final chords evaporated". Austin's production on the album is characterized by low-end definition and various aural details. Other elements in the music include slow jams, a cappella tracks, acid jazz, hip hop, layers of drums, and sirens. Songs such as "Freedom" and "Sunshine & the Rain" exhibit hip hop-influenced production. Martin Johnson of the Chicago Reader comments that the album's "ingeniously gritty sound" evokes older R&B songs such as Aretha Franklin's "Day Dreaming", Curtis Mayfield's "Future Shock", and Sly and the Family Stone's "Family Affair". The a capella opening track "Stand" has rootsy, spiritual harmonies. It segues into "Freedom", a rock-inflected soul song with wailing vocals, electronically distorted sonics, resounding rhythm, and a gospel chorus. "Sunshine & the Rain" is a bass-heavy song. "Memories" is a jazzy, saccharine soul ballad. "Fatal Lovesick Journey" has an intimate, smooth R&B style. "If We Weren't Who We Were" has a low humming sound.

The album has themes of enlightenment, personal freedom, intimate relationships, and womanism. The lyrics celebrate Joi's strength and individuality, and her whimsical, amorous persona exhibits riot grrrl characteristics. Songs such as "Sunshine & the Rain" and "Find Me" are sung from a black feminist perspective. Joi sings in high alto on the album, and her vocals are varied and impassioned. They are also characterized by dramatic accents and, at times, flat and sharp pitches. "I've Found My Niche" has lyrics promoting self-expression. "Find Me" is an ode to self-knowledge, with Joi forcefully singing, "I'll learn from my mistakes and I'll be strong / So I can find me". "Adoramus te Christe" has Latin lyrics and is adapted from Quirino Gasparini's 18th century motet of the same name. The slow, lustful "Narcissa Cutie Pie" has erotic subject matter and was inspired by a sexual experience Joi had with another woman. She recalled the experience and addressed her sexuality in an interview, saying that "I'm not a lesbian [...] But I met a girl who made me question myself". The song also features the album's recurring theme of independence, with Joi declaring "I can do whatever I want to do". "I Don't Mind" features a raga rock style and themes of resignation and acceptance. The a capella "If We Weren't Who We Were" has spiritual overtones and a theme of lovelessness. The closing track is a reprise of "Freedom".

== Release and promotion ==
Austin's Rowdy Records directed their marketing efforts at underground audiences. "Sunshine & the Rain" was released on March 1, 1994. It was a minor club hit. "I Found My Niche" was released on August 2. The album's singles received some exposure with R&B and hip hop audiences.

The album was largely overlooked by consumers upon its release, as its eclectic style was difficult to promote to music outlets such as mainstream urban radio and rock charts. It sold less than 100,000 copies and did not chart. Joi later said of its performance with music listeners, "The people who got it, got it, and they became my fans and that's cool". The album eventually went out of print.

== Critical reception ==
Professional ratings
Review scores
| Source | Rating |
|---|---|
| Allmusic | 4/5 stars |
| Christgau's Consumer Guide | (1-star Honorable Mention) |
| Entertainment Weekly | A |
| Rolling Stone | 3.5/5 stars |
| The Rolling Stone Album Guide | 4/5 stars |

The Pendulum Vibe was met with critical acclaim. Musician magazine hailed the album as "the face of soul to come" with Austin and Joi's "new kind of urban dub" and lyrics: "Joi revels in her own sexuality, without necessarily being defined by it, and faces down most of the contradictions of contemporary R&B without totally rejecting it". David Browne of Entertainment Weekly called Joi "as enigmatic and ear-grabbing as her music" and stated, "Joi's sweet, elastic voice wraps itself up and around spacey pop that exists in a universe all its own". Browne remarked on her eccentric personality and concluded in his review, "Joi leaves you scratching your head, but she fills it with beatific sounds along the way." Rolling Stone called the album "an alluring, shifting cybersexual listening experience" and complimented Joi's "dynamic range". Robert Christgau, writing in The Village Voice, cited "Freedom" and "Narcissa Cutie" as highlights and wrote in summary of the album, "freedom as manumission, freedom as swinging both ways".

In a retrospective review, Allmusic editor Stanton Swihart commended Joi's "versatility" and commented that the album "has a whole lot to offer listeners across a wide spectrum of pop music." Del F. Cowie of Exclaim! called the album "ahead of its time". John Murph of the Washington City Paper wrote that, "artistically, it placed Joi ahead of the pack of prominent R&B singers of the time (SWV, Toni Braxton, Whitney Houston) by sidestepping sap in favor of more vital juices".

== Legacy ==
[The] songwriting veers rebelliously, and often wondrously, through a wide range of stylistic influences [...] At each shift she avoids every conventional ghetto into which she could conceivably be thrust — like LaBelle, Rufus, Prince, and Lenny Kravitz before her — likely the album's major downfall but also its greatest legacy.

— Stanton Swihart, Allmusic

The album established Joi as part of a wave female R&B artists who released similarly styled and themed debuts, including Carleen Anderson, Shara Nelson, and Des'ree. Martin Johnson of the Chicago Reader wrote of their collective legacy in a 1994 article, "[they are] likely to fall through the cracks. Iconoclastic women rockers—such as PJ Harvey, Sinéad O'Connor, and Tori Amos—have gained a small foothold, but like-minded women in R & B often have nowhere to go. Too radical for urban radio, they're left to rely on word of mouth". The Pendulum Vibe garnered the attention of recording artist Madonna, who sought out Joi and developed a friendship with her. She also enlisted Austin to produce songs for her 1994 album Bedtime Stories. Joi attempted to follow up The Pendulum Vibe with Amoeba Cleansing Syndrome in 1997, but the album was shelved after her label folded, and she went on an extended hiatus. She became a long-time collaborator of the Dungeon Family collective and appeared on albums by OutKast, Goodie Mob, and Society of Soul.

Since its initial reception, The Pendulum Vibe has attained a cult following among listeners of eclectic R&B music. Allmusic's Stanton Swihart cites the album as "an integral influence on the neo-soul movement" and "a predecessor to and trailblazer for artists like Dionne Farris and Erykah Badu". Jacinta Howard of Creative Loafing writes that Joi was "arguably the most pivotal - if not the first - artist to arrive on the alternative soul scene, directly influencing acts ranging from Erykah Badu to OutKast to Janelle Monáe." James Hannaham of Spin views that Joi "rewrote the rule book for urban contemporary R&B" with the album, adding that neo soul artists Maxwell and Erykah Badu "then memorized it." Rolling Stone journalist Jon Caramanica writes in The New Rolling Stone Album Guide (2004), "Joi entered the R&B world as a sort of avant-bohemian, doing so-called neosoul music years before Philadelphians like Jill Scott, James Poyser, and Musiq forged a scene to merit the moniker." Miles Marshall Lewis cites The Pendulum Vibe, along with De La Soul's Buhloone Mindstate, the Beastie Boys' Check Your Head, Me'shell Ndegéocello's Plantation Lullabies, D'Angelo's Brown Sugar, as one of the albums that "proved that the aesthetic sentiments of B-boys and bohos were never as divergent as many believed."

In 1998, Stereophile included the album on its list of Records to Die For, with editor Chip Stern calling it "unheralded" and "as visionary an R&B record as I've heard in the past 25 years."

== Track listing ==
| No. | Title | Writer(s) | Producer(s) | Length |
|---|---|---|---|---|
| 1. | "Stand" | | Dallas Austin | 0:37 |
| 2. | "Freedom" | Dallas Austin, Joi Gilliam | Dallas Austin, Diamond D | 4:38 |
| 3. | "Sunshine & the Rain" | Austin, Gilliam | Dallas Austin | 4:37 |
| 4. | "I Found My Niche" | Gilliam | Colin Wolfe | 4:41 |
| 5. | "Find Me" | Austin | Dallas Austin | 4:46 |
| 6. | "Memories" | Austin, Gilliam | Dallas Austin | 5:05 |
| 7. | "Fatal Lovesick Journey" | Austin, Gilliam | Dallas Austin | 5:38 |
| 8. | "Adoramus te Christe" | Traditional | Dallas Austin | 1:59 |
| 9. | "Narcissa Cutie Pie" | Gilliam | Joi (co.), Rondal Rucker | 4:52 |
| 10. | "I Don't Mind" | Austin, Gilliam, Colin Wolfe | Dallas Austin | 3:12 |
| 11. | "If We Weren't Who We Were" | Gilliam | Dallas Austin | 1:26 |
| 12. | "Freedom (Celebration Mix)" | Austin, Gilliam | Dallas Austin, Diamond D | 2:32 |

== Personnel ==
Credits adapted from liner notes.

- Dallas Austin – bass, composer, drums, keyboards, producer, vocals
- Carl T. Boyd – alto saxophone
- Leslie Brathwaite – engineer
- Eddie Davis – trumpet
- Diamond D – drums, producer
- Ron Harville – bass
- Jimmy Jackson – drums
- Joi – co-producer, composer, vocals, vocal arrangements
- Kolorado – drums
- Lingo – additional vocals
- Ricco Lumpkins – assistant
- Dan Matrazzo – keyboards, piano
- Tommy Martin – guitar
- Lloyd L. Oby, Jr. – trombone
- George Pappas – engineer
- The Philly Heads – background vocals
- Rondal Rucker – producer
- Brathwaite Sakina – engineer
- Roderick Smith – flute, horn
- Alvin Speights – engineer
- Randall Vaughn – trumpet
- Stephen Venz – acoustic bass, electric bass
- Reginald W. Ward – guitar
- The Whole Joint – multi-instrumentalist
- Colin Wolfe – bass, composer, producer

== See also ==
- Progressive soul

== Bibliography ==
- Brackett, Nathan; Hoard, Christian, eds. (2004). The New Rolling Stone Album Guide. Completely Revised and Updated 4th Edition. Simon & Schuster. ISBN 0-7432-0169-8.
