= N-Toon =

American contemporary R&B group

- N-Toon, 2000

Background information
- Origin: Atlanta, Georgia, United States
- Genres: R&B
- Years active: 1996–2001
- Labels: DreamWorks Records
- Past members: Lloyd; Justin Clark; Everett Hall; Chuckie D. Reynolds

N-Toon was an R&B group from Atlanta created by former Klymaxx frontwoman Joyce Irby in 1996. The group consisted of Lloyd Polite, Justin Clark, Everett Hall and Chuckie D. Reynolds. The group disbanded in 2001.

Toon Time was released on DreamWorks in March 2000. Later that year, MCA Records crossed over into its parent company, Geffen Records. Many of the artists on its roster were let go, including N-Toon.

== Discography ==
=== Album ===
Album Information
Toon Time
- Released: March 21, 2000

=== Singles ===
Year	Title	Album
1999	"Shoulda Been My Girl"	Toon Time
2000	"Ready"	Toon Time
