= Traci Hale =

- Birth name: Traci Hale
- Origin: Atlanta, Georgia
- Genres: Pop, soul, R&B, hip hop
- Occupation: Singer-songwriter
- Instrument: Vocals
- Years active: 1996–present

Traci Hale is an American R&B songwriter. She began her career as a backing vocalist for R&B singers Keith Sweat and Aaliyah before shifting focus to songwriting work. She has since written songs for music industry artists such as Rihanna, Blu Cantrell, Mýa and Brandy.

Hale has been credited on Rihanna's 2011 single "What's My Name?", which peaked atop the Billboard Hot 100, as well as Mýa's 2000 single "Case of the Ex", which peaked at number two on the chart.

== Career ==
Traci Hale began her career as a backing singer for R&B stars Keith Sweat and Aaliyah. It was while on tour with Aaliyah in 1996 that she shared songs that she had been writing privately with fellow backing vocalist Nycolia "Tye-V" Turman, who was also a songwriter signed to Zomba Music Publishing. Turman invited Hale to write with her at an upcoming session in Los Angeles. Her first collaborations were with Rodney Jerkins and the two worked on the Dr. Dolittle (soundtrack) and Brandy's breakthrough album Never Say Never.

Traci then went on to write with Chris "Tricky" Stewart of Red Zone Entertainment and together they wrote hits including Sammie's "Crazy Things I Do", Mýa's 2000 breakthrough hit "Case of the Ex (Whatcha Gonna Do)". In 2001 Hale wrote a song for the Chris Rock film Down to Earth and songs on albums for Tyrese (RCA), Ginuwine and Usher.

In 2010 Hale co-wrote the song "What's My Name?" with Ester Dean and Stargate, which became a number-one hit on the Billboard Hot 100 for Rihanna.
