= Freeworld Entertainment =

American record label

- Parent company: Independent (1997-1998); Priority Records (1999-2002)
- Founded: 1997
- Founder: Dallas Austin, Kevin Czinger
- Status: Defunct
- Distributors: BMG Entertainment (1997-1998); Priority Records (1999-2002)
- Genre: Alternative rock, Hip hop
- Country of origin: United States
- Location: New York City, New York (1997-1998); Atlanta, Georgia (1999-2002)

Freeworld Entertainment was a record label formed in 1997 by Dallas Austin and Kevin Czinger.

== History ==
=== Inception (1996-1998) ===
The history of Freeworld begins with Kevin Czinger's purchase of Zoo Entertainment from BMG in 1996 with the support of financial backers Allen & Co. Though Zoo was initially run in conjunction with Czinger's own label Volcano Entertainment, it was eventually absorbed into it. In the fall of 1997, Czinger merged the label with Dallas Austin's Rowdy Records to create Freeworld Entertainment. As a combination of the two producers' respective labels, Freeworld consisted of artists from both previous labels' catalogs. The label benefited from Austin's industry connections and Czinger's keen insight into the business. However, the label was wrought with bad luck from its inception. In September 1997, a month after Austin and Czinger worked together, former Volcano flagship artist Tool attempted to dissolve ties to the label by claiming that Freeworld had failed to exercise its option to renew the band's contract. To make matters worse, Austin removed himself from the label after Freeworld made considerable investments in his artists.

Czinger attempted to recall his previous success by changing the name of the label back to Zoo Entertainment, however, the damage was already too severe. In the spring of 1998 after putting more than $20 million info Freeworld, Allen & Co. sold the label to Clive Calder's Zomba Label Group. Zomba eventually brought back the Volcano Entertainment moniker. It wasn't until December 1998 that the lawsuit with Tool was resolved, however, by then the Freeworld name had been dissipated.

=== Reactivation (1999-2002) ===
In early 1999, Priority entered into a relationship with Austin to restart the Freeworld Entertainment label. Some of the first artists on the newly formed label were Detroit vocal quartet Vega and preteen R&B vocalist Sammie. The new version of Freeworld lasted sometime into the early 2000s, however, it eventually dissolved as well. Austin would go on to reform his own Rowdy Records in 2005 under the Universal Music Group.

== Freeworld Artists ==
=== Inception ===
Many artists from Volcano Entertainment and Rowdy Records were on the Freeworld imprint, however, not all came over. The list below consists of artists that had actual physical releases (promotional or otherwise) with Freeworld.

- Tool
- Joi
- The Interpreters
- Lysette Titi
- Derrick Dimitry
- Don Chili

=== Reactivation ===
These artists had released on the second incarnation of Freeworld. They were not necessarily affiliated with the previous incarnation of Freeworld, or with Volcano or Rowdy Records.

- Richard Lugo
- JT Money
- Sammie
- Vega

== See also ==
- Dallas Austin
- Rowdy Records
- Volcano Entertainment
- Zoo Entertainment
